= Archery at the 1976 Summer Paralympics =

Archery at the V Paralympic Games
- Paralympic Archery
- Venue: Centennial Park Fields
- Competitors: 141 from 26 nations

Archery at the 1976 Summer Paralympics consisted of eighteen events. The competition was held at the Centennial Park Fields in Toronto, Ontario, Canada.

== Medal table ==
* Host nation (Canada)

Rank	Nation	Gold	Silver	Bronze	Total
1	France	4	2	0	6
2	West Germany	3	4	1	8
3	United States	3	0	3	6
4	Japan	2	0	0	2
5	Norway	1	2	1	4
6	Great Britain	1	1	3	5
7	Belgium	1	1	0	2
8	Canada*	1	0	1	2
8	Netherlands	1	0	1	2
8	Sweden	1	0	1	2
11	South Africa	0	1	1	2
11	Switzerland	0	1	1	2
13	Finland	0	1	0	1
13	South Korea	0	1	0	1
Totals (14 entries)		18	14	13	45

== Medal summary ==
=== Men's events ===
Event	Gold	Silver	Bronze
Advanced metric round open	R. Schmidberger; West Germany	Thore; France	Hohmann; West Germany
Advanced metric round team open	France; Maraschin; A. Piutti; Thore	West Germany; E. Hammel; Hohmann; R. Schmidberger	Sweden; M. Eden; U. Hornlund; A. Luks
Advanced metric round tetraplegic A-C	T. Parker; Canada	None	None
FITA round open	Guy Grun; Belgium	H. Geiss; West Germany	W. Kokott; South Africa
FITA round team 2-5	United States; Jay Brown; Patrick Krishner; Timothy van der Meiden	Belgium; Aime Desal; Guy Grun; Jozef Meysen	Netherlands; Peter Blanker; Popke Popkema; M. Senders
FITA round tetraplegic A-C	Hans Pimmelar; Netherlands	Oddbjorn Stebekk; Norway	Mike James; Great Britain
Novice and tetraplegics round team A-C	France; J. M. Chapuis; A. Galea; Malgogne	Switzerland; Jack Hautle; Eugen Schuler; Martin Stadler	United States; Vincent Falardeau; Roy Nungester; Noreen Vollbach
Novice round open	J. M. Chapuis; France	A. Galea; France	Jack Hautle; Switzerland
Short metric round open	Shigenobu Hashiguchi; Japan	Yoon Bae Kim; South Korea	Alan Corrie; Great Britain
Short metric round tetraplegic A-C	West Brownlow; United States	None	None
Short metric team open	Great Britain; Gerald Anslow; Nicky Biggs; Alan Corrie	Finland; Hugo Illi; Veikko Puputti; Tauno Valkama	None
Tetraplegic round A-C	Casper Caspersen; Norway	L. Smith; Great Britain	R. Thibodeau; Canada

=== Women's events ===
Event	Gold	Silver	Bronze
Advanced metric round open	Mireille Maraschin; France	Karlsen; Norway	O. Holen; Norway
FITA round open	Bodil Elgh; Sweden	Anneliese Dersen; West Germany	Rhonda July; United States
FITA round team 2-5	United States; Susan Hagel; Rhonda July; Sally Staudte	None	None
Novice round open	Tomoko Yamazaki; Japan	R. Alexander; South Africa	Noreen Vollbach; United States
Short metric round open	S. Battran; West Germany	Waltraud Hagenlocher; West Germany	Gill Matthews; Great Britain
Tetraplegic round A-C	Liebrecht; West Germany	None	None

== Participating nations ==
- Australia (7)
- Belgium (7)
- Canada (9)
- Denmark (2)
- Egypt (2)
- Finland (7)
- France (7)
- Great Britain (13)
- Guatemala (2)
- Hong Kong (1)
- Indonesia (1)
- Ireland (1)
- Italy (3)
- Japan (5)
- Luxembourg (2)
- Mexico (2)
- Netherlands (8)
- New Zealand (3)
- Norway (11)
- South Africa (8)
- South Korea (2)
- Spain (1)
- Sweden (4)
- Switzerland (6)
- United States (13)
- West Germany (14)
