= Swimming at the 1976 Summer Paralympics =

Swimming at the V Paralympic Games
- Paralympic Swimming
- Venue: Centennial Park Olympium

Swimming at the 1976 Summer Paralympics consisted of 146 events. The competition was held at the Centennial Park Olympium in Toronto, Ontario, Canada.

== Medal summary ==
=== Medal table ===
| Rank | Nation | Gold | Silver | Bronze | Total |
|---|---|---|---|---|---|
| 1 | Netherlands | 38 | 19 | 8 | 65 |
| 2 | Israel | 18 | 5 | 6 | 29 |
| 3 | United States | 17 | 5 | 13 | 35 |
| 4 | Great Britain | 13 | 6 | 6 | 25 |
| 5 | Poland | 12 | 15 | 9 | 36 |
| 6 | Sweden | 9 | 19 | 13 | 41 |
| 7 | West Germany | 7 | 5 | 9 | 21 |
| 8 | France | 6 | 6 | 9 | 21 |
| 9 | Austria | 6 | 1 | 1 | 8 |
| 10 | Canada | 5 | 6 | 4 | 15 |
| 11 | Norway | 5 | 1 | 0 | 6 |
| 12 | Australia | 3 | 5 | 2 | 10 |
| 13 | Argentina | 2 | 3 | 4 | 9 |
| 14 | Spain | 2 | 3 | 1 | 6 |
| 15 | Mexico | 1 | 4 | 4 | 9 |
| 16 | Switzerland | 1 | 4 | 2 | 7 |
| 17 | Finland | 1 | 2 | 5 | 8 |
| 18 | Belgium | 0 | 3 | 2 | 5 |
| 18 | South Africa | 0 | 3 | 2 | 5 |
| 20 | Italy | 0 | 1 | 2 | 3 |
| 21 | Egypt | 0 | 1 | 0 | 1 |
| 22 | New Zealand | 0 | 0 | 1 | 1 |
| 22 | Peru | 0 | 0 | 1 | 1 |
| Totals (23 entries) | | 146 | 117 | 104 | 367 |

=== Participating nations ===
- Argentina (8)
- Australia (8)
- Austria (10)
- Belgium (11)
- Brazil (1)
- Canada (26)
- Denmark (5)
- Ecuador (3)
- Egypt (7)
- Fiji (7)
- Finland (14)
- France (20)
- Great Britain (15)
- Greece (2)
- Guatemala (5)
- Hong Kong (2)
- Indonesia (1)
- Ireland (4)
- Israel (24)
- Italy (5)
- Japan (8)
- Luxembourg (1)
- Mexico (19)
- Netherlands (24)
- New Zealand (3)
- Norway (10)
- Peru (1)
- Poland (18)
- South Africa (10)
- Spain (6)
- Sweden (25)
- Switzerland (9)
- United States (32)
- West Germany (18)

=== Men's events ===
| Event | Gold | Silver | Bronze |
|---|---|---|---|
| 25 m freestyle 1A | Mike Kenny; Great Britain | A. West; Great Britain | Pekka Kantola; Finland |
| 25 m freestyle 1B | Stephen Kempf; United States | Dario Bandinelli; Italy | Eduardo Monsalvo; Mexico |
| 25 m freestyle 1C | Robert Ockvirk; United States | Manfred Emmel; West Germany | Kari Lahtinen; Finland |
| 25 m freestyle 2 | Joseph Wanger; Israel | John Hind; Australia | Mark Borgstrom; United States |
| 50 m freestyle 3 | Beltrand de Five; Spain | Gustavo Galindez; Argentina | K. Karlsson; Sweden |
| 50 m freestyle 4 | Scott Robeson; United States | Shlomo Pinto; Israel | M. Vanderriet; South Africa |
| 50 m freestyle D1 | Wolfgang Goris; West Germany | Jac Bakx; Netherlands | A. Maillet; France |
| 50 m freestyle E | Daniel Giladi; Israel | Martin Kers; Netherlands | Atte Karkkainen; Finland |
| 50 m freestyle E1 | Wolfgang Magnet; Austria | None | None |
| 50 m freestyle F | Frits Hildebrandt; Netherlands | Amran Cohen; Israel | Konrad Kolbik; Poland |
| 50 m freestyle F1 | B. Perry; France | None | None |
| 100 m freestyle 5 | Hannes Paragger; Austria | H.G. Heynen; Netherlands | L. Anderson; Sweden |
| 100 m freestyle 6 | Uri Bergman; Israel | Hafiz; Egypt | Harry Lamberts; Netherlands |
| 100 m freestyle A | Frank Skaret; Sweden | James Muirhead; Great Britain | Timothy McIsaac; Canada |
| 100 m freestyle B | S. Verner; Sweden | Anders Eriksson; Sweden | Uwe Duske; West Germany |
| 100 m freestyle C | Grzegorz Biela; Poland | Hans Lindstrom; Sweden | Sven Eryd; Sweden |
| 100 m freestyle C1 | Erling Trondsen; Norway | Rene Kummer; Switzerland | Denis Lapalme; Canada |
| 100 m freestyle D | P. Wismath; West Germany | Karel Hanse; Netherlands | John Friesland; Sweden |
| 25 m backstroke 1A | Mike Kenny; Great Britain | A. West; Great Britain | Pekka Kantola; Finland |
| 25 m backstroke 1B | G. Erikson; Sweden | Eero Maki; Finland | Garry Treadwell; United States |
| 25 m backstroke 1C | Robert Ockvirk; United States | T. Parker; Canada | B. Brooks; Great Britain |
| 25 m backstroke 2 | Joseph Wanger; Israel | Gerrit Pomp; Netherlands | Pascal Cornelis; Belgium |
| 50 m backstroke 3 | Moshe Levy; Israel | Gustavo Galindez; Argentina | Roy Kubig; Australia |
| 50 m backstroke 4 | Scott Robeson; United States | Barney Fegyverneki; Canada | E. Plevier; Netherlands |
| 50 m backstroke D1 | Jac Bakx; Netherlands | Wolfgang Goris; West Germany | A. Alcocer; United States |
| 50 m backstroke E | H. Schweizer; West Germany | Martin Kers; Netherlands | B. Speedy; Great Britain |
| 50 m backstroke E1 | Wolfgang Magnet; Austria | Cailloux; France | None |
| 50 m backstroke F | Frits Hildebrandt; Netherlands | Sepp Gasser; Austria | Konrad Kolbik; Poland |
| 50 m backstroke F1 | B. Perry; France | None | None |
| 100 m backstroke 5 | Tore Nilsson; Sweden | L. Anderson; Sweden | José González Mugaburu; Peru |
| 100 m backstroke 6 | Henk Legebeke; Netherlands | Antonio Castillo; Mexico | Jouko Poyry; Finland |
| 100 m backstroke A | Frank Skaret; Sweden | James Muirhead; Great Britain | Timothy McIsaac; Canada |
| 100 m backstroke B | Siegfried Schulz; West Germany | S. Verner; Sweden | Petter Fielding; Sweden |
| 100 m backstroke C | Robert Gallais; France | B. Tenniglo; Netherlands | Grzegorz Biela; Poland |
| 100 m backstroke C1 | Lasse Eva; Finland | Rene Kummer; Switzerland | Finck; France |
| 100 m backstroke D | Villatte; France | Karel Hanse; Netherlands | P. Wismath; West Germany |
| 25 m breaststroke 1A | Mike Kenny; Great Britain | Raul Langhi; Argentina | Raffin; France |
| 25 m breaststroke 1B | Eduardo Monsalvo; Mexico | Garry Treadwell; United States | Dario Bandinelli; Italy |
| 25 m breaststroke 1C | Robert Ockvirk; United States | Manfred Emmel; West Germany | B. Brooks; Great Britain |
| 25 m breaststroke 2 | Joseph Wanger; Israel | J. Crouse; South Africa | Gerrit Pomp; Netherlands |
| 50 m breaststroke 3 | Wolfgang Stieg; Austria | Miroslaw Owczarek; Poland | Gustavo Galindez; Argentina |
| 50 m breaststroke 4 | Scott Robeson; United States | Andrzej Kietlinski; Poland | D. P. Chambers; New Zealand |
| 50 m breaststroke D1 | A. Alcocer; United States | Jac Bakx; Netherlands | A. Maillet; France |
| 50 m breaststroke E | Daniel Giladi; Israel | Eddy de Vos; Belgium | H. Schweizer; West Germany |
| 50 m breaststroke E1 | Wolfgang Magnet; Austria | None | None |
| 50 m breaststroke F | Frits Hildebrandt; Netherlands | Konrad Kolbik; Poland | None |
| 100 m breaststroke 5 | Tore Nilsson; Sweden | Wojciech Monterial; Poland | Ryszard Machowczyk; Poland |
| 100 m breaststroke 6 | Uri Bergman; Israel | Henk Legebeke; Netherlands | Harry Lamberts; Netherlands |
| 100 m breaststroke A | Frank Skaret; Sweden | Hans Anton Aalien; Norway | Stuce Djupenstrom; Sweden |
| 100 m breaststroke B | Idar Hunstad; Norway | S. Verner; Sweden | Anders Eriksson; Sweden |
| 100 m breaststroke C | Grzegorz Biela; Poland | Sven Eryd; Sweden | Robert Gallais; France |
| 100 m breaststroke C1 | Rene Kummer; Switzerland | Denis Lapalme; Canada | Finck; France |
| 100 m breaststroke D | Karel Hanse; Netherlands | Jurgen Knodel; West Germany | Villatte; France |
| 25 m butterfly 2 | Mark Borgstrom; United States | John Hind; Australia | Joseph Wanger; Israel |
| 25 m butterfly 3 | Gustavo Galindez; Argentina | Moshe Levy; Israel | Luis Perez; Argentina |
| 25 m butterfly 4 | Scott Robeson; United States | M. Vanderriet; South Africa | Shlomo Pinto; Israel |
| 50 m butterfly 5 | D. Bonnar; Great Britain | Moshe Cohen; Israel | L. Anderson; Sweden |
| 50 m butterfly E | Martin Kers; Netherlands | Reino Jaaskelainen; Finland | Eddy de Vos; Belgium |
| 100 m butterfly 6 | Uri Bergman; Israel | Harry Lamberts; Netherlands | Antonio Castillo; Mexico |
| 100 m butterfly A | James Muirhead; Great Britain | Timothy McIsaac; Canada | None |
| 100 m butterfly B | S. Verner; Sweden | None | None |
| 100 m butterfly C | Grzegorz Biela; Poland | Sven Eryd; Sweden | Hans Lindstrom; Sweden |
| 100 m butterfly C1 | Erling Trondsen; Norway | None | None |
| 100 m butterfly D | P. Wismath; West Germany | Hans Schmid; Switzerland | Jurgen Knodel; West Germany |
| 100 m individual medley F1 | B. Perry; France | None | None |
| 75 m individual medley 2 | Joseph Wanger; Israel | John Hind; Australia | Gerrit Pomp; Netherlands |
| 75 m individual medley 3 | Gustavo Galindez; Argentina | Beltrand de Five; Spain | Moshe Levy; Israel |
| 150 m individual medley 4 | Andrzej Kietlinski; Poland | M. Vanderriet; South Africa | Scott Robeson; United States |
| 150 m individual medley 5 | Ryszard Machowczyk; Poland | Tore Nilsson; Sweden | L. Anderson; Sweden |
| 150 m individual medley 6 | Uri Bergman; Israel | Henk Legebeke; Netherlands | Antonio Castillo; Mexico |
| 150 m individual medley D1 | Jac Bakx; Netherlands | A. Maillet; France | A. Alcocer; United States |
| 150 m individual medley E1 | Wolfgang Magnet; Austria | None | None |
| 150 m individual medley F | Frits Hildebrandt; Netherlands | Konrad Kolbik; Poland | Shlomo Kuba; Israel |
| 200 m individual medley C | Grzegorz Biela; Poland | Sven Eryd; Sweden | Robert Gallais; France |
| 200 m individual medley C1 | Erling Trondsen; Norway | Rene Kummer; Switzerland | None |
| 200 m individual medley D | Karel Hanse; Netherlands | Villatte; France | Wolfgang Lang; West Germany |
| 200 m individual medley E | Martin Kers; Netherlands | Eddy de Vos; Belgium | H. Schweizer; West Germany |
| 400 m individual medley A | James Muirhead; Great Britain | Timothy McIsaac; Canada | Vaccara; France |
| 400 m individual medley B | S. Verner; Sweden | None | None |
| 3×50 m medley relay 2-4 | Israel; Moshe Levy; Shlomo Pinto; Joseph Wanger | Poland; Andrzej Kietlinski; Miroslaw Nowakowski; Miroslaw Owczarek | United States; Mark Borgstrom; Mike Molesky; Scott Robeson |
| 3×100 m medley relay open | Poland; Andrzej Kietlinski; Ryszard Machowczyk; Miroslaw Owczarek | Netherlands; H.G. Heynen; Harry Lamberts; Johan Levestone | Sweden; L. Anderson; Tore Nilsson; O. Tjarnberg |
| 4×50 m freestyle relay 2-6 | Israel; Oded Balaban; Uri Bergman; Moshe Levy; Joseph Wanger | United States; Mark Borgstrom; Mike Molesky; Scott Robeson; Randy Wix | Mexico; Antonio Castillo; Rene Corona; Miguel Angel Gaona; Oscar Villela |
| 4×50 m medley relay D | West Germany | None | None |
| 4×100 m medley relay A | Canada; Timothy McIsaac; Jacques Pilon; D. Wall; D. Whitehead | None | None |
| 4×100 m medley relay open | Israel; Uri Bergman; Moshe Cohen; Moshe Levy; Arieh Rubin | Sweden; L. Anderson; K. Karlsson; Tore Nilsson; O. Tjarnberg | Netherlands; H.G. Heynen; Harry Lamberts; Henk Legebeke; J. Oostenbroek |

=== Women's events ===
| Event | Gold | Silver | Bronze |
|---|---|---|---|
| 25 m freestyle 1A | Sue Sherrill; Great Britain | None | None |
| 25 m freestyle 1B | Henny Hilberink; Netherlands | Tournier; France | Rosa Sicari; Italy |
| 25 m freestyle 1C | Ariela Cohen; Israel | None | None |
| 25 m freestyle 2 | Lia Duine; Netherlands | Lyn Michael; Australia | Bella Weinstock; Israel |
| 50 m freestyle 3 | Elena-marie Bey; United States | Anna Pogorzelska; Poland | María Teresa Herreras López; Spain |
| 50 m freestyle 4 | (Soczak)? Poland | Mickey Strole; United States | D. Smith; Great Britain |
| 50 m freestyle D1 | P. Martin; United States | None | None |
| 50 m freestyle E | Jose Evertsen; Netherlands | None | None |
| 100 m freestyle 5 | Marijke Ruiter; Netherlands | Renata Mathiesen; Poland | Lidia Rothe; Poland |
| 100 m freestyle 6 | Lidia ter Beek; Netherlands | Heller; France | None |
| 100 m freestyle A | Marianne Kortekaas; Netherlands | Eila Nilsson; Sweden | R. Collett; United States |
| 100 m freestyle B | Helena Zajaczkowska; Poland | Simmons; Canada | None |
| 100 m freestyle C | Gail Nicholson; Australia | None | None |
| 100 m freestyle D | Monica Vaughan; Great Britain | Britt-Marie Samuelsson; Sweden | Krystyna Sikorska; Poland |
| 25 m backstroke 1A | Sue Sherrill; Great Britain | Josefina Cornejo; Mexico | Karen Donaldson; United States |
| 25 m backstroke 1B | Henny Hilberink; Netherlands | Martha Sandoval; Mexico | Caroline Troxler-Kung; Switzerland |
| 25 m backstroke 1C | Ariela Cohen; Israel | Sharon Myers; United States | None |
| 25 m backstroke 2 | Bella Weinstock; Israel | Lia Duine; Netherlands | Syd Jacobs; United States |
| 50 m backstroke 3 | Elena-Marie Bey; United States | M. Tufuesson; Sweden | M. Schaefer; South Africa |
| 50 m backstroke 4 | Bente Gronli; Norway | Joke Fokkinga-de Zeeuv; Netherlands | D. Smith; Great Britain |
| 50 m backstroke E | Jose Evertsen; Netherlands | None | None |
| 100 m backstroke 5 | Marijke Ruiter; Netherlands | Riekie Adelerhof; Netherlands | Jeanne Backx-de Backer; Netherlands |
| 100 m backstroke 6 | Lidia ter Beek; Netherlands | Heller; France | None |
| 100 m backstroke A | L. Schuerot; United States | Marianne Kortekaas; Netherlands | R. Collett; United States |
| 100 m backstroke B | D. Choptain; Canada | None | None |
| 100 m backstroke C | Gail Nicholson; Australia | None | None |
| 100 m backstroke D | Monica Vaughan; Great Britain | Britt-Marie Samuelsson; Sweden | J. Mitchell; Canada |
| 25 m breaststroke 1A | None | None | None |
| 25 m breaststroke 1B | Henny Hilberink; Netherlands | Martha Sandoval; Mexico | Caroline Troxler-Kung; Switzerland |
| 25 m breaststroke 1C | Ariela Cohen; Israel | None | None |
| 25 m breaststroke 2 | Margit Quell; West Germany | Lia Duine; Netherlands | D. Weber; West Germany |
| 50 m breaststroke 3 | Elena-Marie Bey; United States | María Teresa Herreras López; Spain | Anna Pogorzelska; Poland |
| 50 m breaststroke 4 | Grazyna Haffke; Poland | Ora Goldstein; Israel | Jenny Orpwood; Great Britain |
| 50 m breaststroke E | Jose Evertsen; Netherlands | None | None |
| 100 m breaststroke 5 | Marijke Ruiter; Netherlands | Lidia Rothe; Poland | Renata Mathiesen; Poland |
| 100 m breaststroke 6 | Lidia ter Beek; Netherlands | Barbara Kopycka; Poland | None |
| 100 m breaststroke A | Marianne Kortekaas; Netherlands | Eila Nilsson; Sweden | None |
| 100 m breaststroke B | D. Choptain; Canada | None | None |
| 100 m breaststroke D | Monica Vaughan; Great Britain | Britt-Marie Samuelsson; Sweden | Helen Ronnegard; Sweden |
| 25 m butterfly 2 | Lia Duine; Netherlands | D. Weber; West Germany | Syd Jacobs; United States |
| 25 m butterfly 3 | Elena-Marie Bey; United States | María Teresa Herreras López; Spain | Marcella Rizzotto; Argentina |
| 25 m butterfly 4 | Pauline English; Australia | D. Smith; Great Britain | Barbara Palombi; United States |
| 50 m butterfly 5 | Marijke Ruiter; Netherlands | J. Tornkuiss; Sweden | Rachel Tassa; Israel |
| 50 m butterfly E | Jose Evertsen; Netherlands | None | None |
| 100 m butterfly 6 | Heller; France | Lidia ter Beek; Netherlands | None |
| 100 m butterfly A | R. Collett; United States | None | None |
| 100 m butterfly B | Helena Zajaczkowska; Poland | None | None |
| 100 m butterfly D | Monica Vaughan; Great Britain | Krystyna Sikorska; Poland | Hargreiter; Austria |
| 75 m individual medley 2 | Lia Duine; Netherlands | Lyn Michael; Australia | D. Weber; West Germany |
| 75 m individual medley 3 | María Teresa Herreras López; Spain | M. Tufuesson; Sweden | Marcella Rizzotto; Argentina |
| 150 m individual medley 4 | Grażyna Haffke; Poland | D. Smith; Great Britain | Pauline English; Australia |
| 150 m individual medley 5 | Marijke Ruiter; Netherlands | Renata Mathiesen; Poland | Riekie Adelerhof; Netherlands |
| 150 m individual medley 6 | Lidia ter Beek; Netherlands | Barbara Kopycka; Poland | K. Wiksen; Sweden |
| 200 m individual medley D | Monica Vaughan; Great Britain | Britt-Marie Samuelsson; Sweden | Krystyna Sikorska; Poland |
| 200 m individual medley E | Jose Evertsen; Netherlands | None | None |
| 400 m individual medley B | D. Choptain; Canada | None | None |
| 3×50 m medley relay 2-4 | Netherlands; Lia Duine; Joke Fokkinga-de Zeeuv; Ineke Mol | Poland; Elzbieta Maczka; Anna Pogorzelska; Grazyna Haffke | United States; Elena-Marie Bey; Syd Jacobs; Mickey Strole |
| 3×100 m medley relay open | Netherlands; Jeanne Backx-de Backer; Lidia ter Beek; Marijke Ruiter | Poland; Barbara Kopycka; Renata Mathiesen; Lidia Rothe | None |
| 4×50 m freestyle relay 2-5 | Netherlands; Riekie Adelerhof; Lia Duine; Joke Fokkinga-de Zeeuv; Ineke Mol | United States; Elena-Marie Bey; Syd Jacobs; Sharon Rahn; Mickey Strole | None |
| 4×100 m medley relay B | Canada; G. Bloomfield; D. Choptain; L. Lahey; Simmons | None | None |
| 4×100 m medley relay open | Netherlands; Riekie Adelerhof; Jeanne Backx-de Backer; Lidia ter Beek; Marijke Ruiter | None | None |
