= Athletics at the 1976 Summer Paralympics =

Athletics at the V Paralympic Games
- Venue: Centennial Park Stadium
- Competitors: 774 from 39 nations

Athletics at the 1976 Summer Paralympics consisted of 207 events. Argentina, Burma, Hong Kong, Indonesia and Peru won their first ever medals in the 1976 Summer Paralympics. The competition was held at the Centennial Park Stadium in Toronto, Ontario, Canada.

== Participating nations ==
- Argentina (15)
- Australia (26)
- Austria (37)
- Bahamas (6)
- Belgium (23)
- Brazil (15)
- Burma (4)
- Canada (66)
- Colombia (10)
- Denmark (13)
- Ecuador (2)
- Egypt (23)
- Ethiopia (1)
- Fiji (8)
- Finland (40)
- France (8)
- Great Britain (30)
- Greece (1)
- Hong Kong (9)
- Hungary (1)
- Indonesia (12)
- Ireland (12)
- Israel (32)
- Italy (15)
- Japan (31)
- Mexico (29)
- Netherlands (17)
- New Zealand (12)
- Norway (15)
- Peru (1)
- Poland (18)
- South Africa (33)
- South Korea (1)
- Spain (16)
- Sweden (20)
- Switzerland (38)
- Uganda (1)
- United States (70)
- West Germany (63)

== Medal table ==
* Host nation (Canada)

Rank	Nation	Gold	Silver	Bronze	Total
1	United States	39	34	26	99
2	West Germany	21	16	16	53
3	Mexico	15	9	5	29
4	Israel	15	5	7	27
5	Canada*	12	18	18	48
6	Poland	12	2	3	17
7	Finland	11	15	10	36
8	Sweden	8	6	9	23
9	Austria	7	11	14	32
10	Australia	7	11	4	22
11	Japan	7	6	3	16
12	New Zealand	7	1	2	10
13	Belgium	6	3	2	11
14	Switzerland	5	5	7	17
15	Netherlands	5	5	3	13
16	Egypt	5	1	1	7
17	Great Britain	4	5	8	17
18	South Africa	4	3	7	14
19	France	4	1	1	6
20	Norway	3	3	2	8
21	Denmark	3	0	1	4
22	Ireland	2	9	6	17
23	Italy	2	3	5	10
24	Spain	2	3	1	6
25	Indonesia	1	1	3	5
26	Argentina	1	1	2	4
27	Burma	1	1	1	3
28	Hong Kong	0	0	1	1
28	Hungary	0	0	1	1
28	Peru	0	0	1	1
Totals (30 entries)		209	178	170	557

== Medal summary ==
=== Men's events ===
Event	Gold	Silver	Bronze
60 m 1A	Juan Almaraz; Mexico	Francisco de las Fuentes; Mexico	Peter Marsh; Australia
60 m 1B	Eduardo Monsalvo; Mexico	Carmelo Addaris; Italy	Walter Sailer; Austria
60 m 1C	D. Miller; New Zealand	West Brownlow; United States	Hiroshi Nakagawa; Japan
60 m A	Ryszard Kozuch; Poland	Shuzo Yagi; Japan	
60 m A	Ryszard Kozuch; Poland	Jarle Johnsen; Norway	
100 m 2	Gary Kerr; United States	Eusebio Valdez; Mexico	Terry Rae; Great Britain
100 m 3	Jim Hernandez; United States	Lars Lofstrom; Sweden	Charles Williams; United States
100 m 4	David Kiley; United States	Raymond Lewandowski; United States	Birger Nordh; Sweden
100 m 5	Rolf Johansson; Sweden	Randy Wix; United States	Ebo Roek; Netherlands
100 m B	Winford Haynes; United States	Robert Faulkner; Australia	Jozsef Olah; Hungary
100 m C	Aharon Danziger; Israel	Magella Belanger; Canada	Mg Tin Win; Burma
100 m C1	Mg Tin Hgwe; Burma	Mg Aung Than; Burma	Alois Karner; Austria
100 m D	J. Harrison; Canada	S. Holcomb; Canada	None
100 m D1	Curt Brinkman; United States	M. Johnson; United States	D. Hoddleston; South Africa
100 m E	Daniel Giladi; Israel	Ashari; Indonesia	Veikko Hiltunen; Finland
100 m E1	Cailloux; France	None	None
100 m F	Antonio Delgado; Spain	José Santos; Spain	Amran Cohen; Israel
100 m F1	B. Perry; France	None	None
100 m prosthesis D1	Walter Fink; Austria	None	None
200 m 2	Eusebio Valdez; Mexico	Gary Kerr; United States	Carlo Jannucci; Italy
200 m 3	Jim Hernandez; United States	Charles Williams; United States	P. H. van der Vis; Netherlands
400 m 2	Eusebio Valdez; Mexico	Carlo Jannucci; Italy	Giusepie Trieste; Italy
400 m 3	Charles Williams; United States	Sergio Zepeda; Mexico	Jim Hernandez; United States
800 m 4	David Kiley; United States	Remi Ophem; Belgium	Chris Stoddard; Canada
800 m 5	P. Colisto; Canada	Randy Wix; United States	W. Jiling; West Germany
1500 m 4	David Kiley; United States	Rene Corona; Mexico	Birger Nordh; Sweden
1500 m 5	Randy Wix; United States	P. Colisto; Canada	W. Jiling; West Germany
1500 m E	Said Dowara; Egypt	None	None
1500 m E1	Jorn Nielsen; Denmark	None	None
1500 m F	J. Alexandre; France	L. Larsen; Norway	Heikki Miettinen; Finland
1500 m F1	B. Perry; France	None	None
1500 m walk B	Derek Howie; Great Britain	Victor Goetz; Canada	Henning Erikson; Denmark
4×40 m relay A-C	United States	Mexico	West Germany
4×60 m relay 2-5	United States	Sweden; Bengt Christoffersson; Rolf Johansson; Lars Lofstrom; Birger Nordh	Mexico; Rene Corona; Eusebio Valdez; Roberto Vargas; Sergio Zepeda
4 × 100 m relay E	Finland; Raimo Hiiri; Veikko Hiltunen; Reino Jaaskelainen; Arvi Lattunen	None	None
High jump (two foot take off) A	C. Gillfors; Sweden	Martti Juntunen; Finland	Jarle Johnsen; Norway
High jump A	John Bowman; United States	Doug Rupe; Australia	T. Lewis; United States
High jump B	August Hofer; Austria	Richard Barnhart; United States	Martin Sallaert; Belgium
High jump C	Jurgen Johann; West Germany	Roni Fradkin; Israel	Shek Kau Wong; Hong Kong
High jump D	Arnold Boldt; Canada	Konrad Reisner; Austria	W. Hilzinger; West Germany
High jump E	A. Broeckhuysen; Netherlands	None	None
High jump F	Nitzan Atzmon; Israel	Heikki Miettinen; Finland	Gerhard Kolm; Austria
Long jump A	Jarle Johnsen; Norway	C. Gillfors; Sweden	Heikki Koistinen; Finland
Long jump B	Risto Piippo; Finland	Julio Gutierrez; Spain	Mats Lindblad; Sweden
Long jump C	Roni Fradkin; Israel	Jurgen Johann; West Germany	Dieter Belz; West Germany
Long jump D	Arnold Boldt; Canada	Konrad Reisner; Austria	W. Hilzinger; West Germany
Long jump E	Jan Krauz; Poland	A. Broeckhuysen; Netherlands	None
Long jump F	Antonio Delgado; Spain	Nitzan Atzmon; Israel	José Santos; Spain
Club throw 1A	Ruben Vazquez; Mexico	Patrick McCool; Ireland	Rod Vleiger; United States
Club throw 1B	G. Cochius; South Africa	R. Muise; Canada	Julius Duval; United States
Precision club throw 1A-1B	Philip Wouters; Belgium	Samir; Egypt	Peter Marsh; Australia
Discus throw 1A	Wayne Patchett; Australia	Patrick McCool; Ireland	Ruben Vazquez; Mexico
Discus throw 1B	Stephen Kempf; United States	Julius Duval; United States	R. Muise; Canada
Discus throw 1C	Siegmar Henker; West Germany	Manfred Emmel; West Germany	David Hynds; New Zealand
Discus throw 2	Robert Tusa; United States	Clause Stevens; Ireland	Doug Lyons; Canada
Discus throw 3	Eric Russell; Australia	David Williamson; United States	Yitzhak Galitzki; Israel
Discus throw 4	Remi Ophem; Belgium	Eugene Reimer; Canada	Luis Grieb; Argentina
Discus throw 5	Chaim Fliter; Israel	Ed Owen; United States	Ray Clark; United States
Discus throw A	Pekka Kujala; Finland	Carl Lind; Finland	Tadeusz Milewski; Poland
Discus throw B	Jan Brzegowski; Poland	Teuno Talmia; Finland	Timo Sulisalo; Finland
Discus throw C	Hans Josefiak; West Germany	Dieter Belz; West Germany	E. Kuehnel; West Germany
Discus throw C1	Tauno Mannila; Finland	Harry Moseby; Australia	Moshe Barbalat; Israel
Discus throw D	Isashar Navon; Israel	Kanda; Austria	Ebbe Berglund; Sweden
Discus throw D1	John Jerome; United States	J. Behan; United States	Curt Brinkman; United States
Discus throw E	Atte Karkkainen; Finland	Alois Beez; West Germany	Raimo Hiiri; Finland
Discus throw F	Achiel Braet; Belgium	Sepp Gasser; Austria	Saneng Hanafi; Indonesia
Discus throw J1	Metwali Ahmed Khadr; Egypt	None	None
Javelin throw 1C	Tommy Hite; United States	Siegmar Henker; West Germany	Guenter Spiess; West Germany
Javelin throw 2	J. F. G. Weyers; Netherlands	Ron Halsey; United States	John Kestel; Australia
Javelin throw 3	Reno Levis; United States	Eric Russell; Australia	David Williamson; United States
Javelin throw 4	Michael Cunningham; Ireland	John Kidd; Australia	Eugene Reimer; Canada
Javelin throw 5	Chaim Fliter; Israel	Ray Clark; United States	P. Morel; France
Javelin throw A	Pekka Kujala; Finland	Jago Mikulic; Australia	Robert Fraeyman; Belgium
Javelin throw B	Timo Sulisalo; Finland	Terje Hansen; Norway	Idar Hunstad; Norway
Javelin throw C	E. Kuehnel; West Germany	J. Stam; Netherlands	Pelanzer; Austria
Javelin throw C1	E. Niebuhr; West Germany	Alois Karner; Austria	W. Lerubo; South Africa
Javelin throw D	Ebbe Berglund; Sweden	Leon Sur; France	Reino Teivonen; Finland
Javelin throw D1	John Jerome; United States	J. Behan; United States	M. Johnson; United States
Javelin throw F	Achiel Braet; Belgium	M. Roberts; Great Britain	Saneng Hanafi; Indonesia
Javelin throw J	Avraham Levi; Israel	None	None
Javelin throw J1	Metwali Ahmed Khadr; Egypt	None	None
Precision javelin throw 1C-5	Walter Telsnig; Austria		Honorio Romero; Argentina
Precision javelin throw 1C-5	Roy Nungester; United States		Honorio Romero; Argentina
Precision javelin throw C	Chihiro Hatta; Japan	Antti Nikkinen; Finland	J. Stam; Netherlands
Precision javelin throw C1	Tauno Mannila; Finland	Kalle Rajanalme; Finland	Bengt-Gosta Johansson; Sweden
Precision javelin throw D	Ebbe Berglund; Sweden	Yoshiharu Honpa; Japan	Winkler; Austria
Precision javelin throw D1	J. Behan; United States	D. Hoddleston; South Africa	Zenji Hasegawa; Japan
Precision javelin throw E	Veikko Hiltunen; Finland	Chris Facey; Canada	Raimo Hiiri; Finland
Precision javelin throw F	Itria Dini; Indonesia	Veikko Suokas; Finland	Abedo; Egypt
Precision javelin throw J	Avraham Levi; Israel	None	None
Precision javelin throw J1	Metwali Ahmed Khadr; Egypt	None	None
Shot put 1A	Edund Weber; West Germany	Wayne Patchett; Australia	Ruben Vazquez; Mexico
Shot put 1B	Julius Duval; United States	Stephen Kempf; United States	Fabian Kohlbrenner; Switzerland
Shot put 1C	Guenter Spiess; West Germany	Siegmar Henker; West Germany	Tommy Hite; United States
Shot put 2	Doug Lyons; Canada	Murray Todd; Australia	Clause Stevens; Ireland
Shot put 2	Doug Lyons; Canada	Murray Todd; Australia	N. Weber; South Africa
Shot put 3	Eric Russell; Australia	L. Labuschagne; South Africa	Jim Savage; New Zealand
Shot put 4	Bill Lean; New Zealand	Johann Schuhbauer; West Germany	Walter Pfaller; Austria
Shot put 5	Ray Clark; United States	Horst Gotthelf; West Germany	Chaim Fliter; Israel
Shot put A	Pekka Kujala; Finland	Carl Lind; Finland	W. Klein; West Germany
Shot put B	Dieter Grundmann; West Germany	Teuno Talmia; Finland	Andrzej Pawlik; Poland
Shot put C	Dieter Belz; West Germany	E. Kuehnel; West Germany	Hans Josefiak; West Germany
Shot put C1	Tauno Mannila; Finland	Alois Karner; Austria	Moshe Barbalat; Israel
Shot put D	Werner Brawand; Switzerland	Reino Teivonen; Finland	Isashar Navon; Israel
Shot put D1	John Jerome; United States	J. Behan; United States	D. Hoddleston; South Africa
Shot put E	Alois Beez; West Germany	Atte Karkkainen; Finland	Reino Jaaskelainen; Finland
Shot put F	Achiel Braet; Belgium	Sepp Gasser; Austria	Itria Dini; Indonesia
Shot put J1	Metwali Ahmed Khadr; Egypt	None	None
Football accuracy E1	Jorn Nielsen; Denmark	None	None
Football distance E1	Jorn Nielsen; Denmark	None	None
Slalom 1A	Juan Almaraz; Mexico	Rod Vleiger; United States	Ed Batt; Canada
Slalom 1B	Eduardo Monsalvo; Mexico	Carmelo Addaris; Italy	Leif Hedman; Sweden
Slalom 1C	D. Miller; New Zealand	Hiroshi Nakagawa; Japan	Tommy Hite; United States
Slalom 2	Eusebio Valdez; Mexico	Eloy Guerrero; Spain	Schmicking; West Germany
Slalom 2	Eusebio Valdez; Mexico	Eloy Guerrero; Spain	Carlo Jannucci; Italy
Slalom 3	Lars Lofstrom; Sweden	Michio Saito; Japan	James Steuwe; United States
Slalom 4	Yoshiteru Hoshi; Japan	Brian McNicholl; New Zealand	Chris Stoddard; Canada
Slalom 5	Isao Kishino; Japan	Kenichi Tomita; Japan	Rolf Johansson; Sweden
Pentathlon 1A	A. West; Great Britain	Matti Launonen; Finland	None
Pentathlon 1B	Steiner; West Germany	Dennis Cherenko; Canada	Leif Hedman; Sweden
Pentathlon 1C	Guenter Spiess; West Germany	Siegmar Henker; West Germany	Felix Lettner; Austria
Pentathlon 2	Schmicking; West Germany	Jouko Korhonen; Finland	Clarence Bastarache; Canada
Pentathlon 3	Eric Russell; Australia	Kleinjans; West Germany	David Williamson; United States
Pentathlon 4	Johann Schuhbauer; West Germany	Eugene Reimer; Canada	Taiso Kainu; Finland
Pentathlon 5	Ray Clark; United States	Filip Bardoel; Belgium	E. Englebrecht; South Africa
Pentathlon A	Ryszard Kozuch; Poland	Reuven Perach; Israel	Jago Mikulic; Australia
Pentathlon B	Andrzej Pawlik; Poland	Lars-Goran Nilsson; Sweden	W. Martens; West Germany
Pentathlon C	Zvi Hoffman; Israel	Nils Ander; Sweden	Apschner; Austria
Pentathlon C1	Bengt-Gosta Johansson; Sweden	Henryk Piatkowski; Poland	Karl Prichtzig; Austria
Pentathlon D	Gerhard Grinninger; Austria	Karl Haider; Austria	Chris Ireland; Great Britain
Pentathlon E	A. Broeckhuysen; Netherlands	Reino Jaaskelainen; Finland	Chris Facey; Canada
Pentathlon E1	Wolfgang Magnet; Austria	None	None
Pentathlon F	Sepp Gasser; Austria	Heikki Miettinen; Finland	Amran Cohen; Israel

=== Women's events ===
Event	Gold	Silver	Bronze
60 m 1A	Josefina Cornejo; Mexico	Ruth Wendt; United States	Lourdes Morales; Mexico
60 m 1B	Martha Sandoval; Mexico	Rosaleen Gallagher; Ireland	Rosa Sicari; Italy
60 m 1C	Tracey Freeman; Australia	Sharon Myers; United States	Gilberte Brasey; Switzerland
60 m 2	Glee Lyford; United States	Kathleen Fagan; Ireland	Concepcion Salguero; Mexico
60 m 3	B. Howie; Great Britain	Ellyn Boyd; United States	Karen Casper; United States
60 m 4	Annie Cornil; Belgium	Sharon Rahn; United States	Carol Bryant; Great Britain
60 m 5	Helene Håkansson; Sweden	Silke Boll; West Germany	Constance Head; United States
60 m A	Irena Bak; Poland	J. Pacquette; Canada	
60 m A	Irena Bak; Poland	T. Stevenson; Canada	
100 m B	Reidun Laengen; Norway	Yasuko Takeuchi; Japan	Lynda Bethel; Great Britain
100 m D1	P. Martin; United States	None	None
100 m F	Lina Franzese; Italy	None	None
200 m 2	Elisabeth Bisquolm; Switzerland	Concepcion Salguero; Mexico	Glee Lyford; United States
200 m 3	Ellyn Boyd; United States	Karen Casper; United States	Emilie Schwarz; Austria
400 m 2	Elisabeth Bisquolm; Switzerland	Concepcion Salguero; Mexico	Glee Lyford; United States
400 m 3	Ellyn Boyd; United States	Karen Casper; United States	Emilie Schwarz; Austria
800 m 4	Sharon Rahn; United States	Annie Cornil; Belgium	Gisela Hermes; West Germany
800 m 5	Silke Boll; West Germany	Helene Håkansson; Sweden	Masami Morimoto; Japan
1500 m F1	Lina Franzese; Italy	None	None
4×40 m relay 25	United States	West Germany	Austria
High jump A	B. Stanger; Canada	None	None
High jump B	G. Bloomfield; Canada	None	None
Long jump A	A. Anderson; Sweden	Donna Brown; United States	T. Stevenson; Canada
Long jump B	Reidun Laengen; Norway	Lucille Baillargeon; Canada	None
Long jump D	Stefania Chwedoruk; Poland	None	None
Club throw 1A	Josefina Cornejo; Mexico	Ruth Wendt; United States	Joyce Murland; Canada
Club throw 1B	Martha Sandoval; Mexico	Ruth Rosenbaum; United States	Rosaleen Gallagher; Ireland
Precision club throw 1A-1B	L. Claasen; South Africa	Josefina Cornejo; Mexico	Ruth Rosenbaum; United States
Discus throw 1A	Josefina Cornejo; Mexico	Ruth Wendt; United States	Joyce Murland; Canada
Discus throw 1B	Martha Sandoval; Mexico	Ruth Rosenbaum; United States	Rosaleen Gallagher; Ireland
Discus throw 1C	Gilberte Brasey; Switzerland	Tracey Freeman; Australia	Sharon Myers; United States
Discus throw 2	Krystyna Owczarczyk; Poland	Kathleen Fagan; Ireland	Christine Doprill; Ireland
Discus throw 3	Eve M. Rimmer; New Zealand	Emilie Schwarz; Austria	Waltraud Hagenlocher; West Germany
Discus throw 4	Ora Goldstein; Israel	Lucie Raiche; Canada	Darleen Quinlan; United States
Discus throw 5	Hazel Terry; Great Britain	Zipora Rubin-Rosenbaum; Israel	J. Josephs; South Africa
Discus throw A	J. Pacquette; Canada	Marie Harrower; Great Britain	Marguerite Grosjean; Switzerland
Discus throw B	Bozena Kwiatkowska; Poland	L. Lahey; Canada	Lynda Bethel; Great Britain
Discus throw D	Th. Engelbertink; Netherlands	Edeltraud Russo; Switzerland	None
Javelin throw 1C	Tracey Freeman; Australia	Gilberte Brasey; Switzerland	Sharon Myers; United States
Javelin throw 2	Margit Quell; West Germany	Elaine Schreiber; Australia	Christine Doprill; Ireland
Javelin throw 3	Eve M. Rimmer; New Zealand	Waltraud Hagenlocher; West Germany	Rosalie Hixson; United States
Javelin throw 4	Darleen Quinlan; United States	Mickey Strole; United States	Elaine Ell; Canada
Javelin throw 5	Zipora Rubin-Rosenbaum; Israel	J. Josephs; South Africa	Margarethe Oberrauter; Austria
Javelin throw A	J. Pacquette; Canada	None	None
Javelin throw B	Lucille Baillargeon; Canada	Lynda Bethel; Great Britain	None
Javelin throw D	Th. Engelbertink; Netherlands	Diane Pidskalny; Canada	Teresa Chiappo; Peru
Javelin throw D1	P. Martin; United States	None	None
Precision javelin throw 1C-5	B. Delport; South Africa	C. van der Vis-Morel; Netherlands	S. Carraz; Switzerland
Precision javelin throw D	Ryoko Sakuraba; Japan	Hargreiter; Austria	Diane Pidskalny; Canada
Precision javelin throw D1	P. Martin; United States	None	None
Shot put 1A	L. Claasen; South Africa	Parra Gonzalez; Argentina	Ruth Wendt; United States
Shot put 1B	Ruth Rosenbaum; United States	Rosaleen Gallagher; Ireland	Caroline Troxler-Kung; Switzerland
Shot put 1C	Tracey Freeman; Australia	Gilberte Brasey; Switzerland	Sharon Myers; United States
Shot put 2	Margit Quell; West Germany	Christine Doprill; Ireland	Krystyna Owczarczyk; Poland
Shot put 3	Eve M. Rimmer; New Zealand	Waltraud Hagenlocher; West Germany	Emilie Schwarz; Austria
Shot put 4	Ora Goldstein; Israel	Mickey Strole; United States	Darleen Quinlan; United States
Shot put 5	Zipora Rubin-Rosenbaum; Israel	Hazel Terry; Great Britain	Eva Burgunder; Switzerland
Shot put A	Irena Bak; Poland	Marguerite Grosjean; Switzerland	Marie Harrower; Great Britain
Shot put B	Yasuko Takeuchi; Japan	Bozena Kwiatkowska; Poland	Lucille Baillargeon; Canada
Shot put D	Edeltraud Russo; Switzerland	Th. Engelbertink; Netherlands	Diane Pidskalny; Canada
Shot put D1	P. Martin; United States	None	None
Slalom 1A	Ruth Wendt; United States	Lourdes Morales; Mexico	Karen Donaldson; United States
Slalom 1B	Ruth Rosenbaum; United States	Rosaleen Gallagher; Ireland	Rosa Sicari; Italy
Slalom 1C	Sharon Myers; United States	Tracey Freeman; Australia	Gilberte Brasey; Switzerland
Slalom 2	Cristina Benedetti; Argentina	Glee Lyford; United States	Kathleen Fagan; Ireland
Slalom 3	Martina Tschoetschel; West Germany	Emilie Schwarz; Austria	M. Schaefer; South Africa
Slalom 4	Tomoko Yamazaki; Japan	Darleen Quinlan; United States	Rita Laux; West Germany
Slalom 5	Masami Morimoto; Japan	Joanne McDonald; Canada	Silke Boll; West Germany
Pentathlon 1A	Josefina Cornejo; Mexico	None	None
Pentathlon 1B	Rosaleen Gallagher; Ireland	Caroline Troxler-Kung; Switzerland	Jane Blackburn; Great Britain
Pentathlon 1C	Liebrecht; West Germany	None	None
Pentathlon 2	Rosa Schweizer; Austria	Lynette Hunter; United States	Dawn Jackson; Great Britain
Pentathlon 3	Eve M. Rimmer; New Zealand	Waltraud Hagenlocher; West Germany	D. Crow; Canada
Pentathlon 4	S. Battran; West Germany	Ora Goldstein; Israel	Elaine Ell; Canada
Pentathlon 5	Zipora Rubin-Rosenbaum; Israel	Hazel Terry; Great Britain	None
Pentathlon A	J. Pacquette; Canada	B. Stanger; Canada	T. Stevenson; Canada
Pentathlon B	Lucille Baillargeon; Canada	Simmons; Canada	None
Pentathlon D	Stefania Chwedoruk; Poland	None	None
Pentathlon D1	Barbara Bedla; Poland	None	None
