= Table tennis at the 1976 Summer Paralympics =

Table tennis at the V Paralympic Games
- Paralympic Table tennis
- Venue: Centennial Park West Arena

Table tennis at the 1976 Summer Paralympics consisted of 28 events, 17 for men and 11 for women. The competition was held at the Centennial Park West Arena in Toronto, Ontario, Canada.

== Medal table ==
* Host nation (Canada)

Rank	Nation	Gold	Silver	Bronze	Total
1	Switzerland	4	1	0	5
2	West Germany	3	6	1	10
3	Great Britain	3	2	6	11
4	Austria	3	2	1	6
5	United States	2	3	2	7
6	Sweden	2	2	2	6
7	Netherlands	2	1	1	4
8	Ireland	2	1	0	3
9	Israel	2	0	0	2
10	Canada*	1	1	2	4
11	South Korea	1	1	1	3
12	Hungary	1	0	0	1
12	Peru	1	0	0	1
14	France	0	2	1	3
15	Finland	0	1	1	2
15	Hong Kong	0	1	1	2
17	Mexico	0	1	0	1
17	South Africa	0	1	0	1
19	Belgium	0	0	2	2
20	Denmark	0	0	1	1
20	Italy	0	0	1	1
20	Norway	0	0	1	1
Totals (22 entries)		27	26	24	77

== Medal summary ==
=== Men's events ===
Event	Gold	Silver	Bronze
Singles 1A	Hans Rosenast; Switzerland	Rainer Küschall; Switzerland	Pekka Hatinen; Finland
Singles 1B	Stephen Bradshaw; Great Britain	Wolfgang Koch; West Germany	Walter Sailer; Austria
Singles 1C	Manfred Emmel; West Germany	B. Boerstler; West Germany	Gregor Bonderud; Sweden
Singles 2	Tae Am Choi; South Korea	Leslie Lam; Canada	J. Meursing; Netherlands
Singles 3	Heinz Simon; West Germany	Fritz Krimmel; West Germany	Kum Du Son; South Korea
Singles 4-5	Baruch Hagai; Israel	Michael Dempsey; United States	Richard de Zutter; Belgium
Singles 4-5	Baruch Hagai; Israel	Michael Dempsey; United States	Olle Johansson; Sweden
Singles C	Jörgen Augustsson; Sweden	Shek Kau Wong; Hong Kong	Hon Keung Tong; Hong Kong
Singles D	G. Chrak; Canada	P. Chassagne; France	Jozef de Vrieze; Belgium
Singles D1	M. Johnson; United States	D. Hoddleston; South Africa	J. Behan; United States
Singles E	Zoltán Tauber; Hungary	A. Pettersson; Sweden	B. Speedy; Great Britain
Doubles 1A	Switzerland; Rainer Küschall; Hans Rosenast	Finland; Pekka Hatinen; Matti Launonen	Norway; Casper Caspersen; Jan Erik Stenberg
Doubles 1B	Great Britain; Stephen Bradshaw; Tommy Taylor	West Germany; Konkel; Steiner	None
Doubles 1C	West Germany; B. Boerstler; Wolfgang Koch	Sweden; Gregor Bonderud; Gert Nilsson	Denmark; Bjalne Eriksen; Eric Funder
Teams 2	Sweden; Bror Heding; Gert Nilsson	South Korea; Tae Am Choi; Young Tae Kim; Gun Hong Ko	Great Britain; Billy Leake; Derek Williams
Teams 3	Switzerland; Erich Buehler; Ignaz Casutt; Peter Mrose	West Germany; Fritz Krimmel; Heinz Simon	Canada; Noor Jamal; Les Lam
Teams 4-5	United States; Michael Dempsey; Gary Kerr	West Germany; Binner; H. Gentner	Great Britain; Neil McDonald; Derek Riches

=== Women's events ===
Event	Gold	Silver	Bronze
Singles 1A	Julia Cosgrove; Ireland	Ruth Wendth; United States	None
Singles 1B	Jane Blackburn; Great Britain	Frances O'Sullivan; Ireland	Rosa Sicari; Italy
Singles 1C	Michal Escapa; Israel	Martha Sandoval; Mexico	None
Singles 2	Rosa Schweizer; Switzerland	Maguy Ramousse; France	Gill Matthews; Great Britain
Singles 3	Brigitte Hahn; Austria	Ingrid Voboril; Austria	Janet Swann; Great Britain
Singles 4-5	Irene Schmidt; Netherlands	Gerda Becker; Netherlands	Carol Bryant; Great Britain
Singles D	Teresa Chiappo; Peru	None	None
Doubles 1B	Ireland; Julia Cosgrove; Frances O'Sullivan	United States; Ruth Rosenbaum; Ruth Wendth	None
Teams 2	Austria; Ilse Scharf; Rosa Schweizer	Great Britain; Maggy Jones; Gill Matthews	France; M. Ramousse; Tournier
Teams 3	Austria; Brigitte Hahn; Ingrid Voboril	Great Britain; Gwen Buck; J. Swann	Canada; P. Barnard; L. Stewart
Teams 3	Austria; Brigitte Hahn; Ingrid Voboril	Great Britain; Gwen Buck; J. Swann	United States; Beata Anderson; Rosalie Hixson
Teams 4-5	Netherlands; Gerda Becker; Irene Schmidt	Austria; Hermina Kraft; Maria Schitter	West Germany; Ruth Lamsbach; Winckelmann
