= Netherlands at the 1976 Summer Paralympics =

- Flag of the Netherlands
- IPC code: NED (HOL used at these Games)
- NPC: Nederlands Olympisch Comité * Nederlandse Sport Federatie
- Website: paralympisch.nl (in Dutch)

in Toronto
- Competitors: 58 (41 men and 17 women)
- Medals Ranked 2nd: Gold 45 Silver 25 Bronze 14 Total 84

Summer Paralympics appearances (overview)
- 1960; 1964; 1968; 1972; 1976; 1980; 1984; 1988; 1992; 1996; 2000; 2004; 2008; 2012; 2016; 2020; 2024

Netherlands competed at the 1976 Summer Paralympics in Toronto, Canada. The team included 58 athletes, 41 men and 17 women. Competitors from Netherlands won 84 medals, including 45 gold, 25 silver and 14 bronze to finish 2nd in the medal table.

== Medalists ==
Medal	Name	Sport	Event
Gold	Hans Pimmelaar	Archery	Men's FITA Round Tetraplegic A-C
Gold	Ruud Broeckhuysen	Athletics	Men's High Jump E
Gold	Jozef Weyers	Athletics	Men's Javelin 2
Gold	Ruud Broeckhuysen	Athletics	Men's Pentathlon E
Gold	Thea Engelbertink	Athletics	Women's Discus D
Gold	Thea Engelbertink	Athletics	Women's Javelin D
Gold	Henk Legebeke	Swimming	Men's 100 m Backstroke 6
Gold	Karel Hanse	Swimming	Men's 100 m Breaststroke D
Gold	Jacques Bakx	Swimming	Men's 3x50 m Individual Medley D1
Gold	Frits Hildebrandt	Swimming	Men's 3x50 m Individual Medley F
Gold	Karel Hanse	Swimming	Men's 4x50 m Individual Medley D
Gold	Martin Kers	Swimming	Men's 4x50 m Individual Medley E
Gold	Jacques Bakx	Swimming	Men's 50 m Backstroke D1
Gold	Frits Hildebrandt	Swimming	Men's 50 m Backstroke F
Gold	Frits Hildebrandt	Swimming	Men's 50 m Breaststroke F
Gold	Martin Kers	Swimming	Men's 50 m Butterfly E
Gold	Frits Hildebrandt	Swimming	Men's 50 m Freestyle F
Gold	Marijke Ruiter	Swimming	Women's 100 m Backstroke 5
Gold	Lidia ter Beek	Swimming	Women's 100 m Backstroke 6
Gold	Marijke Ruiter	Swimming	Women's 100 m Breaststroke 5
Gold	Lidia ter Beek	Swimming	Women's 100 m Breaststroke 6
Gold	Marianne Kortekaas	Swimming	Women's 100 m Breaststroke A
Gold	Marijke Ruiter	Swimming	Women's 100 m Freestyle 5
Gold	Lidia ter Beek	Swimming	Women's 100 m Freestyle 6
Gold	Marianne Kortekaas	Swimming	Women's 100 m Freestyle A
Gold	Henny Hilberink	Swimming	Women's 25 m Backstroke 1B
Gold	Henny Hilberink	Swimming	Women's 25 m Breaststroke 1B
Gold	Lia Duine	Swimming	Women's 25 m Butterfly 2
Gold	Henny Hilberink	Swimming	Women's 25 m Freestyle 1B
Gold	Lia Duine	Swimming	Women's 25 m Freestyle 2
Gold	Jeanne Backx-de Backer; Lidia ter Beek; Marijke Ruiter	Swimming	Women's 3x100 m Medley Relay open
Gold	Lia Duine	Swimming	Women's 3x25 m Individual Medley 2
Gold	Marijke Ruiter	Swimming	Women's 3x50 m Individual Medley 5
Gold	Lidia ter Beek	Swimming	Women's 3x50 m Individual Medley 6
Gold	Lia Duine; Joke Fokkinga-de Zeeuv; Ineke Mol	Swimming	Women's 3x50 m Medley Relay 2-4
Gold	Riekie Adelerhof; Jeanne Backx-de Backer; Lidia ter Beek; Marijke Ruiter	Swimming	Women's 4x100 m Medley Relay open
Gold	Riekie Adelerhof; Lia Duine; Joke Fokkinga-de Zeeuv; Ineke Mol	Swimming	Women's 4x50 m Freestyle Relay 2-5
Gold	Jose Evertsen	Swimming	Women's 4x50 m Individual Medley E
Gold	Jose Evertsen	Swimming	Women's 50 m Backstroke E
Gold	Jose Evertsen	Swimming	Women's 50 m Breaststroke E
Gold	Marijke Ruiter	Swimming	Women's 50 m Butterfly 5
Gold	Jose Evertsen	Swimming	Women's 50 m Butterfly E
Gold	Jose Evertsen	Swimming	Women's 50 m Freestyle E
Gold	Irene Schmidt	Table tennis	Women's Singles 4-5
Gold	Gerda Becker; Irene Schmidt	Table tennis	Women's Teams 4-5
Silver	J. Stam	Athletics	Men's Javelin C
Silver	Ruud Broeckhuysen	Athletics	Men's Javelin E
Silver	Ruud Broeckhuysen	Athletics	Men's Long Jump E
Silver	C. van der Vis-Morel	Athletics	Women's Precision Javelin 1C-5
Silver	Thea Engelbertink	Athletics	Women's Shot Put D
Silver	B. Tenniglo	Swimming	Men's 100 m Backstroke C
Silver	Karel Hanse	Swimming	Men's 100 m Backstroke D
Silver	Henk Legebeke	Swimming	Men's 100 m Breaststroke 6
Silver	Harry Lamberts	Swimming	Men's 100 m Butterfly 6
Silver	H.G. Heynen	Swimming	Men's 100 m Freestyle 5
Silver	Karel Hanse	Swimming	Men's 100 m Freestyle D
Silver	Gerrit Pomp	Swimming	Men's 25 m Backstroke 2
Silver	H.G. Heynen; Harry Lamberts; Johan Levestone	Swimming	Men's 3x100 m Medley Relay open
Silver	Henk Legebeke	Swimming	Men's 3x50 m Individual Medley 6
Silver	Martin Kers	Swimming	Men's 50 m Backstroke E
Silver	Jacques Bakx	Swimming	Men's 50 m Breaststroke D1
Silver	Jacques Bakx	Swimming	Men's 50 m Freestyle D1
Silver	Martin Kers	Swimming	Men's 50 m Freestyle E
Silver	Riekie Adelerhof	Swimming	Women's 100 m Backstroke 5
Silver	Marianne Kortekaas	Swimming	Women's 100 m Backstroke A
Silver	Lidia ter Beek	Swimming	Women's 100 m Butterfly 6
Silver	Lia Duine	Swimming	Women's 25 m Backstroke 2
Silver	Lia Duine	Swimming	Women's 25 m Breaststroke 2
Silver	Joke Fokkinga-de Zeeuv	Swimming	Women's 50 m Backstroke 4
Silver	Gerda Becker	Table tennis	Women's Singles 4-5
Bronze	Peter Blanker; Popke Popkema; M. Senders	Archery	Men's FITA Round Team 2-5
Bronze	Ebo Roek	Athletics	Men's 100 m 5
Bronze	P.H. van der Vis	Athletics	Men's 200 m 3
Bronze	J. Stam	Athletics	Men's Precision Javelin C
Bronze	Peter Blanker; Popke Popkema	Dartchery	Men's Pairs open
Bronze	Harry Lamberts	Swimming	Men's 100 m Breaststroke 6
Bronze	Harry Lamberts	Swimming	Men's 100 m Freestyle 6
Bronze	Gerrit Pomp	Swimming	Men's 25 m Breaststroke 2
Bronze	Gerrit Pomp	Swimming	Men's 3x25 m Individual Medley 2
Bronze	H.G. Heynen; Harry Lamberts; Henk Legebeke; J. Oostenbroek	Swimming	Men's 4x100 m Medley Relay open
Bronze	E. Plevier	Swimming	Men's 50 m Backstroke 4
Bronze	Jeanne Backx-de Backer	Swimming	Women's 100 m Backstroke 5
Bronze	Riekie Adelerhof	Swimming	Women's 3x50 m Individual Medley 5
Bronze	J. Meursing	Table tennis	Men's Singles 2

Source: www.paralympic.org & www.olympischstadion.nl

== See also ==
- Netherlands at the Paralympics
- Netherlands at the 1976 Summer Olympics
