= Canada at the 1976 Summer Paralympics =

- Flag of Canada
- IPC code: CAN
- NPC: Canadian Paralympic Committee
- Website: www.paralympic.ca

in Toronto
- Medals Ranked 6th: Gold 25 Silver 26 Bronze 26 Total 77

Summer Paralympics appearances (overview)
- 1968; 1972; 1976; 1980; 1984; 1988; 1992; 1996; 2000; 2004; 2008; 2012; 2016; 2020; 2024

Canada was the host of the 1976 Summer Paralympics in Toronto. Its athletes finished sixth in the overall medal count.

This was Canada's first and only appearance on Canadian soil.

== Medallists ==
Medal	Name	Sport	Event
Gold	J. Harrison	Athletics	Men's 100m D
Gold	P. Colisto	Athletics	Men's 800m 5
Gold	Arnold Boldt	Athletics	Men's high jump D
Gold	Arnold Boldt	Athletics	Men's long jump D
Gold	Doug Lyons	Athletics	Men's shot put 2
Gold	Beverly Stanger	Athletics	Women's high jump A
Gold	G. Bloomfield	Athletics	Women's high jump B
Gold	Jean Pacquette	Athletics	Women's discus throw A
Gold	Jean Pacquette	Athletics	Women's javelin throw A
Gold	Lucille Baillargeon	Athletics	Women's javelin throw B
Gold	Jean Pacquette	Athletics	Women's pentathlon A
Gold	Lucille Baillargeon	Athletics	Women's pentathlon B
Gold	P. Lynn	Lawn bowls	Men's singles B
Gold	F. Widgory	Lawn bowls	Men's singles C
Gold	Victor Goetz; P. Lynn	Lawn bowls	Men's pairs B
Gold	R. Thibodeau	Shooting	Mixed rifle shooting 1A-1C
Gold	J. Byrns	Shooting	Mixed rifle shooting amputee
Gold	Dean Mellway	Snooker	Men's 2-5
Gold	Timothy McIsaac; Jacques Pilon; D. Wall; D. Whitehead	Swimming	Men's 4x100m medley relay A
Gold	Doris Choptain	Swimming	Women's 100m backstroke B
Gold	Doris Choptain	Swimming	Women's 100m breaststroke B
Gold	Doris Choptain	Swimming	Women's 400m individual medley B
Gold	G. Bloomfield; D. Choptain; L. Lahey; Simmons	Swimming	Women's 4x100m medley relay B
Gold	G. Chrak	Table tennis	Men's singles D
Silver	Magella Belanger	Athletics	Men's 100m C
Silver	S. Holcomb	Athletics	Men's 100m D
Silver	P. Colisto	Athletics	Men's 1500m 5
Silver	Victor Goetz	Athletics	Men's 1500m walk B
Silver	R. Muise	Athletics	Men's club throw 1B
Silver	Eugene Reimer	Athletics	Men's discus throw 4
Silver	Chris Facey	Athletics	Men's precision javelin throw E
Silver	Dennis Cherenko	Athletics	Men's pentathlon 1B
Silver	Eugene Reimer	Athletics	Men's pentathlon 4
Silver	Jean Pacquette	Athletics	Women's 60m A
Silver	T. Stevenson	Athletics	Women's 60m A
Silver	Lucille Baillargeon	Athletics	Women's long jump B
Silver	Lucie Raiche	Athletics	Women's discus throw 4
Silver	L. Lahey	Athletics	Women's discus throw B
Silver	Diane Pidskalny	Athletics	Women's javelin throw D
Silver	Joanne McDonald	Athletics	Women's slalom 5
Silver	B. Stanger	Athletics	Women's pentathlon A
Silver	Simmons	Athletics	Women's pentathlon B
Silver	Joyce Murland	Shooting	Mixed rifle shooting 1A-1C
Silver	T. Parker	Swimming	Men's 25m backstroke 1C
Silver	Barney Fegyverneki	Swimming	Men's 50m backstroke 4
Silver	Denis Lapalme	Swimming	Men's 100m breaststroke C1
Silver	Timothy McIsaac	Swimming	Men's 100m butterfly A
Silver	Timothy McIsaac	Swimming	Men's 400m individual medley A
Silver	Simmons	Swimming	Women's 100m freestyle B
Silver	Les Lam	Table tennis	Men's singles 2
Bronze	R. Thibodeau	Archery	Men's tetraplegic round A-C
Bronze	Chris Stoddard	Athletics	Men's 800m 4
Bronze	R. Muise	Athletics	Men's discus throw 1B
Bronze	Doug Lyons	Athletics	Men's discus throw 2
Bronze	Eugene Reimer	Athletics	Men's javelin throw 4
Bronze	Ed Batt	Athletics	Men's slalom 1A
Bronze	Chris Stoddard	Athletics	Men's slalom 4
Bronze	Clarence Bastarache	Athletics	Men's pentathlon 2
Bronze	Chris Facey	Athletics	Men's pentathlon E
Bronze	T. Stevenson	Athletics	Women's long jump A
Bronze	Joyce Murland	Athletics	Women's club throw 1A
Bronze	Joyce Murland	Athletics	Women's discus throw 1A
Bronze	Elaine Ell	Athletics	Women's javelin throw 4
Bronze	Diane Pidskalny	Athletics	Women's precision javelin throw D
Bronze	Lucille Baillargeon	Athletics	Women's shot put B
Bronze	Diane Pidskalny	Athletics	Women's shot put D
Bronze	D. Crow	Athletics	Women's pentathlon 3
Bronze	Elaine Ell	Athletics	Women's pentathlon 4
Bronze	T. Stevenson	Athletics	Women's pentathlon A
Bronze	Jacques Pilon	Athletics	Men's singles A
Bronze	Timothy McIsaac	Swimming	Men's 100m freestyle A
Bronze	Denis Lapalme	Swimming	Men's 100m freestyle C1
Bronze	Timothy McIsaac	Swimming	Men's 100m backstroke A
Bronze	J. Mitchell	Swimming	Women's 100m backstroke D
Bronze	Noor Jamal; Les Lam	Table tennis	Men's teams 3
Bronze	P. Barnard; L. Stewart	Table tennis	Women's teams 3

== See also ==
- Canada at the Paralympics
- Canada at the 1976 Summer Olympics
