= Athletics at the 1976 Summer Paralympics – Women's pentathlon 1A =

Women's pentathlon 1A at the V Paralympic Games
- Paralympic Athletics
- Competitors: 1 from 1 nation

Medalists
1st place, gold medalist(s)		Josefina Cornejo	Mexico

The Women's pentathlon 1A was a pentathlon event held in athletics at the 1976 Summer Paralympics in Toronto.

Josefina Cornejo of Mexico was the only competitor. She completed the event, alone, scoring 7633.2 points and taking the gold medal.

Rank	Athlete	Points
1st place, gold medalist(s)	Josefina Cornejo (MEX)	7633.2
