= Norway at the 1976 Summer Paralympics =

- IPC code: NOR
- NPC: Norwegian Olympic and Paralympic Committee and Confederation of Sports
- Website: www.idrett.no (in Norwegian)

in Toronto
- Medals Ranked 16th: Gold 9 Silver 6 Bronze 4 Total 19

Summer Paralympics appearances (overview)
- 1960; 1964; 1968; 1972; 1976; 1980; 1984; 1988; 1992; 1996; 2000; 2004; 2008; 2012; 2016; 2020; 2024

Norway sent a delegation to compete at the 1976 Summer Paralympics in Toronto, Canada. Its athletes finished sixteenth in the overall medal count.

== Medalists ==
Medal	Name	Sport	Event
Gold	Casper Caspersen	Archery	Men's tetraplegic round A-C
Gold	Jarle Johnsen	Athletics	Men's long jump A
Gold	Reidun Laengen	Athletics	Women's 100m B
Gold	Reidun Laengen	Athletics	Women's long jump B
Gold	Erling Trondsen	Swimming	Men's 100m freestyle C1
Gold	Idar Hunstad	Swimming	Men's 100m breaststroke B
Gold	Erling Trondsen	Swimming	Men's 100m butterfly C1
Gold	Erling Trondsen	Swimming	Men's 200m individual medley C1
Gold	Bente Grønli	Swimming	Women's 50m backstroke 4
Silver	Oddbjørn Stebekk	Archery	Men's FITA round tetraplegic A-C
Silver	Åse Karlsen	Archery	Women's advanced metric round open
Silver	Jarle Johnsen	Athletics	Men's 60m A
Silver	Leif Larsen	Athletics	Men's 1500m F
Silver	Terje Hansen	Athletics	Men's javelin throw B
Silver	Geir Ålien	Swimming	Men's 100m breaststroke A
Bronze	Oddfrid Holen	Archery	Women's advanced metric round open
Bronze	Jarle Johnsen	Athletics	Men's high jump (two foot take off) A
Bronze	Idar Hunstad	Athletics	Men's javelin throw B
Bronze	Casper Caspersen; Jan Erik Stenberg	Table tennis	Men's doubles 1A

== See also ==
- Norway at the Paralympics
- Norway at the 1976 Summer Olympics
