= New Zealand at the 1976 Summer Paralympics =

- IPC code: NZL
- NPC: Paralympics New Zealand
- Website: paralympics.org.nz

in Toronto
- Competitors: 12
- Medals Ranked 18th: Gold 7 Silver 1 Bronze 5 Total 13

Summer Paralympics appearances (overview)
- 1968; 1972; 1976; 1980; 1984; 1988; 1992; 1996; 2000; 2004; 2008; 2012; 2016; 2020; 2024

New Zealand sent a 12 sportspeople strong delegation to the 1976 Olympiad for the Physically Disabled in Toronto, Ontario, Canada. At these Games, New Zealand won 13 medals at the 1976 Summer Paralympics: 7 golds, 1 silver, and 5 bronze medals. Eve Rimmer was the most decorated Paralympian at these Games, winning 5 gold medals in athletics.

These Games were New Zealand's third Summer Games appearance. They missed the Winter Games in the same cycle. Political factors involving a South African rugby tour in New Zealand led to a boycott of the 1976 Games by some countries. New Zealand's role in inviting South Africa to the country led to additional scrutiny regarding their participation in Toronto.

== History ==
The Games represented the country's third appearance at the Summer Games, having missed the first two editions in 1960 in Rome and the 1964 Games in Tokyo. Starting in the 1976 for the Games, governance was managed by Paralympics New Zealand. This organization continues to be responsible for Paralympic Games selection in New Zealand.

New Zealand did not participate in the 1976 Winter Paralympics that took place in Ornskoldsvik, Sweden in the same year.

New Zealand's participation in these Games was not without scrutiny. The country had welcome the South African rugby union team to do a tour of their country. At the same time, South Africa participated in these Games. New Zealand's decision and South Africa's participation led to Uganda, Sudan, Jamaica, India, Kenya, and Yugoslavia pulling out of participating in the 1976 Games.

== Team ==
New Zealand's delegation in Toronto was 12 sportspeople strong. The New Zealand delegation at the 1976 Games included Paul Chambers, Graham Condon, Fred Creba, Ross Hynds, Bill Lean, Graeme Marett, Brian McNicholl, Dennis Miller, Doug Moore, Reuben Ngata, Eve Rimmer, and Jim Savage.

=== Graham Condon ===
Condon was competing in his third Games. He would compete in six total Paralympic Games for New Zealand, leading the country in total Paralympic Games appearances.

=== Fred Creba ===
Creba died in 2013 when he was 68 years old. In 1975, his sporting performances, including setting a world record in weightlifting, earned him the title, "South Canterbury Sportsperson of the Year."

=== Ross Hynds ===
Hynds made his debut at these Games, going on to represent New Zealand at the 1976, 1980, 1984, and 1992 in archery and athletics.

Hynds attended Saint Kentigern Old Collegians. When he was a 22-year-old, he was in a car accident that left him a paraplegic. Starting in 1970, he started competing in New Zealand's National Disabled Championships and would compete in it for 30 straight years. At the 1974 Commonwealth Paraplegic Games, he served as New Zealand's Vice Captain. After the Games, he made the switch to wheelchair rugby, making New Zealand's first national team in 1991. He also took up sailing, representing New Zealand internationally from 1988 to 1998. In 2006, he was awarded Paralympics New Zealand Order of Merit for outstanding service to Paralympic Sport. He died in 2015.

=== Bill Lean ===
Lean qualified for the 1976 Games earlier in the year at the Commonwealth Paraplegic Games. He was one of six members of the team to qualify for Toronto at the event.

Lean would go on to be selected to represent New Zealand for the 1980 Summer Paralympics, but had to miss those Games because of a heart problem. Having made his debut at the 1968 Games, Lean was his country's seventh ever Paralympian. When he died in 1976, NZ Paralympics said of him,

The Paralympics New Zealand Board and Staff wishes to pass our condolences on to the family of Bill Lean. Sadly Bill passed away on 2 April 2015 aged 73, after a short illness….Bill made his Paralympic debut in Israel 1968 Paralympic Games, this was the first team that Paralympics New Zealand sent to a Paralympic Games. He then went on to compete at the Toronto 1976 Paralympic Games where he won a Gold medal in the Men’s Shot Put 4 and set a new World Record. Bill continued to represent New Zealand at the Holland 1980 Paralympic Games where unfortunately he could not compete due to heart problems. Bill was a very talented Paralympian competing in a variety of sports including Archery, Athletics, Bowls and Table Tennis….Bill is New Zealand's seventh Paralympian. Bill is to be commended and remembered as it is early Paralympians such as Bill that have paved the way for future Paralympians to succeed today and in the future…’

Lean had taken up sport following an accident where he fell from a tree as a 19-year-old. Sports played a key role in his rehabilitation. He made his international debut in 1966. He went to Toronto after having won gold at the 1974 Commonwealth Games in Dunedin, where he set a world record lift of 202.50 kg in the heavyweight class. He also competed at the Commonwealth Paraplegic Games in Jamaica in 1966.

=== Graeme Marett ===
Three time Paralympian Marett made his final Paralympic Games appearance at the 1976 Games. During the course of his Paralympic career, he competed in several sports including Archery, Athletics, Swimming, and Table Tennis. Otago native Marret went to Toronto with a fair bit of international experience. He competed at the Commonwealth Paraplegic Games in Jamaica in 1966.

=== Reuben Ngata ===
Reuben Ngata would later take up boccia after the Toronto Games. He competed at the 1968 and 1976 Games in multiple sports including Athletics, Power Lifting, and Table Tennis. Between those two Games, he won a single bronze medal in weightlifting. He would go on to be named a Parafed Auckland life member.

=== Jim Savage ===
In 1974, he became a Member of the Order of the British Empire. Throughout his international disability sports career, he would win 19 medals in wheelchair sports. In 2001, he was awarded the Paralympics New Zealand Order of Merit.

== Medallists ==
New Zealand won 7 golds, 1 silver and 5 bronze medals at the 1976 Games.

Medal	Sport	Name	Event	Ref
Gold	Athletics	Bill Lean	Men's Shot Put 4	
Gold	Athletics	Dennis Miller	Men's 60m 1C	
Gold	Athletics	Dennis Miller	Men's Slalom 1C	
Gold	Athletics	Eve Rimmer	Women's Discus 3	
Gold	Athletics	Eve Rimmer	Women's Javelin 3	
Gold	Athletics	Eve Rimmer	Women's Pentathlon 3	
Gold	Athletics	Eve Rimmer	Women's Shot Put 3	
Silver	Athletics	Brian McNicholl	Men's Slalom 4	
Bronze	Athletics	Ross Hynds	Men's Discus 1C	
Bronze	Athletics	Jim Savage	Men's Shot Put 3	
Bronze	Swimming	Paul Chambers	Men's 50m Breaststroke 4	
Bronze	Weightlifting	Fred Creba	Men's Light-Heavyweight	
Bronze	Weightlifting	Reuben Ngata	Men's Lightweight	

== Athletics ==
New Zealand competed in athletic events at the 1976 Games, being represented by Graham Condon, Ross Hynds, Bill Lean, Graeme Marett, Brian McNicholl, Dennis Miller, Doug Moore, Eve Rimmer and Jim Savage.

Lean won gold in the Men's Shot Put 4 event. In the process, he also set a new world record with a throw of 8.87 meters. In 2011, The Otago Times called his performance at these Games as the 101 greatest moment in Otago sport.

David Ross Hynds competed in the shot put, javelin and discus events. After qualifying for the finals in the discus, he went on to win bronze in the event.

== Weightlifting ==
Creba competed at the 1986 Games in the light-heavyweight division. He managed a lift of 172.5 kg. This performance was good enough to earn him a bronze medal. Creba went to Toronto after having won three medals at the Japanese hosted 1975 East and South Pacific Games. He went into those Games as a world record holder, and then bettered it there.

== See also ==
- New Zealand at the Paralympics
