= Jim Hernandez =

American paralympic athlete

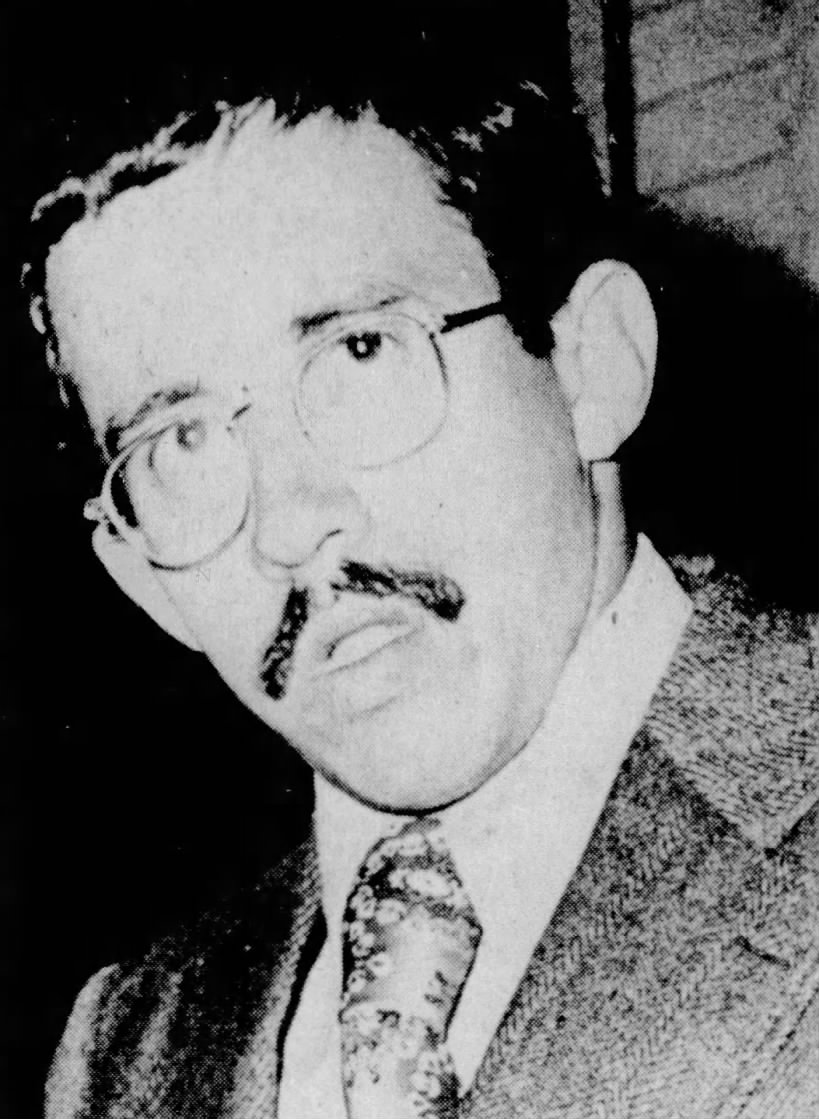
- Hernandez in 1972

Personal information
- Born: 1946 or 1947 (age 79–80)

Sport
- Country: United States
- Sport: Para-athletics
Medal record
Representing United States
Paralympic Games
Para-athletics
Gold medal – first place	1976 Toronto	Men's 100 m 3
Gold medal – first place	1976 Toronto	Men's 200 m 3
Bronze medal – third place	1976 Toronto	Men's 400 m 3

Jim Hernandez (born 1946/1947) (Note: Hernandez was 25 years old while he was an employee at Thornley's in 1972.) is an American paralympic athlete. He competed at the 1976 Summer Paralympics.

== Life and career ==
Hernandez was a wheelchair racer.

Hernandez represented the United States at the 1976 Summer Paralympics, winning two gold medals and a bronze medal in athletics.
