= Daniel Giladi =

Israeli Paralympic volleyball player, athlete, and swimmer

Personal information
- Native name: דניאל גלעדי
Medal record
Event / 1st / 2nd / 3rd; Paralympic Games / 4 / 0 / 0
Representing Israel
Paralympic Games
Men's volleyball
Gold medal – first place	1976 Toronto	Volleyball - standing
Men's para athletics
Gold medal – first place	1976 Toronto	100m - E
Men's para swimming
Gold medal – first place	1976 Toronto	50m breaststroke E
Gold medal – first place	1976 Toronto	50m freestyle E

Daniel Giladi (Hebrew: דניאל גלעדי) competed for Israel in swimming, and men's standing volleyball at the 1976 Summer Paralympics, and the 2000 Summer Paralympics, winning four gold medals in 1976.

At the 1976 Summer Paralympics he also competed in para athletics, winning a gold medal in the men's 100 m E event, and para swimming, winning gold medals in the men's 50 m freestyle E and 50 m breaststroke E events.

== See also ==
- Israel at the 1976 Summer Paralympics
- Israel at the 2000 Summer Paralympics
