= 1977 Intertoto Cup =

Tournament details
- Teams: 40

Final positions
- Champions: Group winners Halmstad; Duisburg; Inter Bratislava; Slavia Sofia; Slavia Prague; Frem; Jednota Trenčín; Slovan Bratislava; Öster; Pogoń Szczecin

Tournament statistics
- Matches played: 120

In the 1977 Intertoto Cup no knock-out rounds were contested, and therefore no winner was declared.

== Group stage ==
The teams were divided into ten groups of four teams each.

=== Group 1 ===
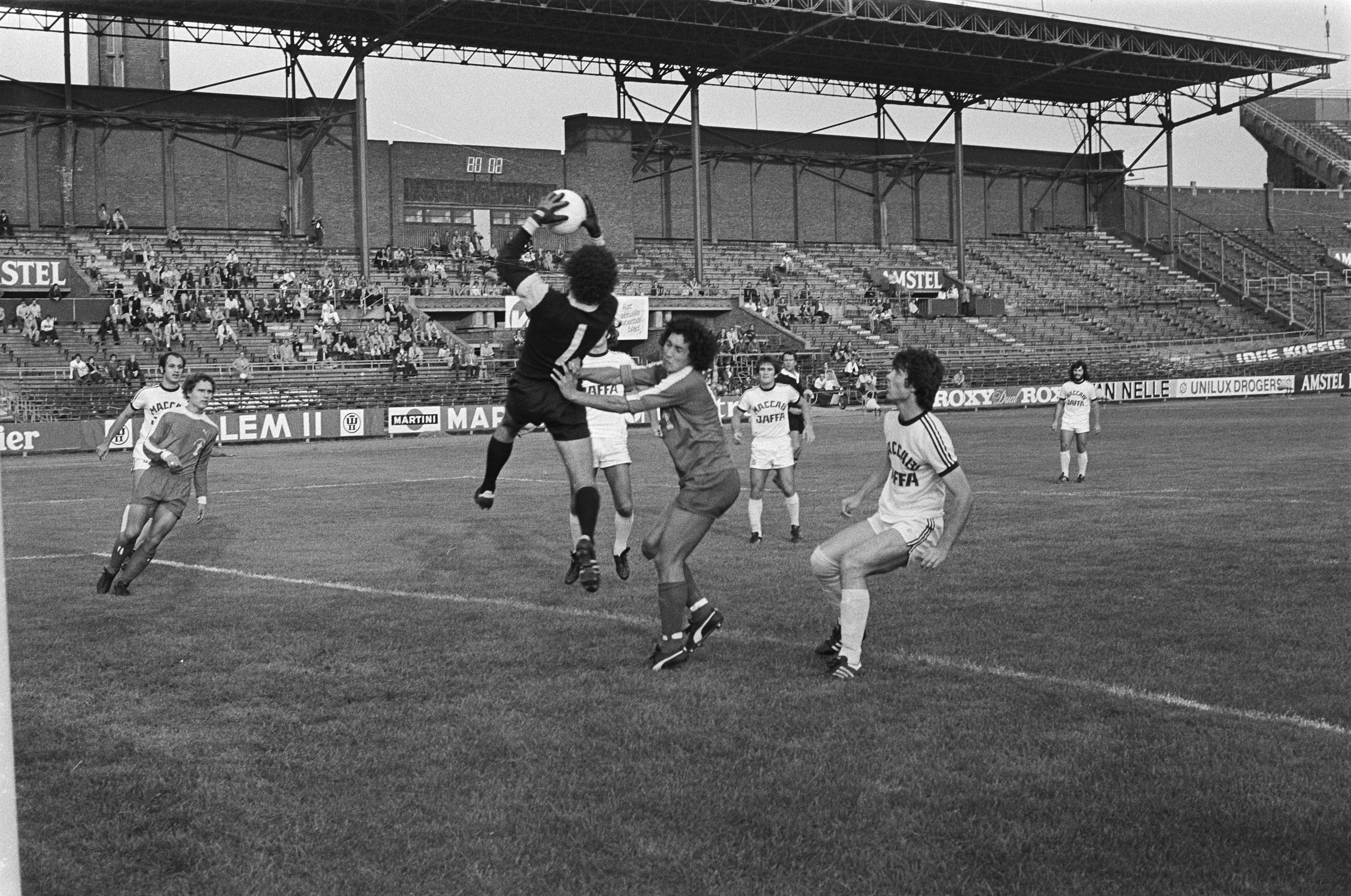
FC Amsterdam vs Maccabi Jaffa

Pos	Team	Pld	W	D	L	GF	GA	GD	Pts	HAL	VOJ	AMS	MJA
1	(Sweden) Halmstad	6	2	3	1	12	8	+4	7	—	3–1	1–1	4–1
2	(Socialist Federal Republic of Yugoslavia) Vojvodina	6	3	1	2	14	12	+2	7	3–2	—	2–2	FF; Awd 3–0 *
3	(Netherlands) Amsterdam	6	1	3	2	9	9	0	5	1–1	1–2	—	3–1
4	(Israel) Maccabi Jaffa	6	2	1	3	9	15	−6	5	1–1	4–3	2–1	—

Source: mogiel.net
Rules for classification: 1) Points; 2) Goal difference; 3) Goals scored; 4) Head-to-head points; 5) Away goals scored; 6) Draw.
- Note to the match Vojvodina–Maccabi Jaffa: Maccabi Jaffa declaired forfeit and the match was awarded as a 3–0 victory for Vojvodina.

=== Group 2 ===
Pos	Team	Pld	W	D	L	GF	GA	GD	Pts	DUI	STA	TWE	MTA
1	(West Germany) Duisburg	6	3	2	1	13	7	+6	8	—	4–0	2–3	2–2
2	(Belgium) Standard Liège	6	3	1	2	8	9	−1	7	0–0	—	2–1	2–1
3	(Netherlands) Twente	6	3	0	3	13	13	0	6	0–2	3–2	—	3–4
4	(Israel) Maccabi Tel Aviv	6	1	1	4	10	15	−5	3	2–3	0–2	1–3	—

Source: mogiel.net
Rules for classification: 1) Points; 2) Goal difference; 3) Goals scored; 4) Head-to-head points; 5) Away goals scored; 6) Draw.
25 June 1977

Maccabi Tel Aviv (Israel)	2-3	(West Germany) Duisburg
Avraham Levi 43'; Benny Tabak 78'	Report	Rudolf Seliger 6', 25'; Vogel 75'

Bloomfield Stadium, Tel Aviv
Attendance: 9,000
Referee: Moshe Ashkenazi (Israel)

02 July 1977

Maccabi Tel Aviv (Israel)	0-2	(Belgium) Standard Liège
	Report	Ásgeir Sigurvinsson 60'; Helmut Graf 67'

Bloomfield Stadium, Tel Aviv
Attendance: 8,000
Referee: Menachem Ashkenazi (Israel)

9 July 1977

Maccabi Tel Aviv (Israel)	1–3	(Netherlands) Twente
Benny Tabak 32'	Reports: 1 2	Ab Gritter 13', 84', 90'

Bloomfield Stadium, Tel Aviv
Attendance: 6,000
Referee: Naftali Eitan (Israel)

13 July 1977

Twente (Netherlands)	3–4	(Israel) Maccabi Tel Aviv
Ab Gritter 13', 89'; Kick van der Vall 55'	Reports: 1 2	Vicky Peretz 38', 55'; Benny Tabak 46', 68'

Sportpark Duintjesveld, Zandvoort
Attendance: 2,500
Referee: Henk van Dijken (Netherlands)

16 July 1977

(West Germany) Duisburg	2-2	(Israel) Maccabi Tel Aviv
Herbert Büssers 6', 83'	Report	Vicky Peretz 13', 63'

Schauinsland-Reisen-Arena, Duisburg

17 July 1977

Standard Liège (Belgium)	2–1	(Netherlands) Twente
Visnyei Gyula 15'; Ásgeir Sigurvinsson 80'	Report	Ab Gritter 89'

Stade Maurice Dufrasne, Liège
Attendance: 3,356
Referee: Jan Peeters (Belgium)

20 July 1977

Twente (Netherlands)	0–2	(West Germany) Duisburg
	Report	Rudolf Seliger 69'; Herbert Büssers 81'

Diekman Stadion, Enschede
Attendance: 6,044
Referee: Jan Keizer (Netherlands)

23 July 1977

Duisburg (Germany)	2–3	(Netherlands) Twente
Eduard Marschang 34'; Kurt Jara 80'	Report	Ab Gritter 2', 81'; Frans Thijssen 49'

Schauinsland-Reisen-Arena, Duisburg
Attendance: 2,439
Referee: Walter Eschweiler (West Germany)

23 July 1977

Standard Liège (Belgium)	2-1	Maccabi Tel Aviv (Israel)
Harald Nickel 15'; Theo Poel 83'	Report	Benny Tabak 37'

Stade Maurice Dufrasne, Liège
Attendance: 10,000

30 July 1977

Twente (Netherlands)	3–2	(Belgium) Standard Liège
Jaap Bos 4', 48', 51'	Report	Alfred Riedl 7', 57'

Diekman Stadion, Enschede
Attendance: 4,108
Referee: Henk van Ettekoven (Netherlands)

=== Group 3 ===
Pos	Team	Pld	W	D	L	GF	GA	GD	Pts	BRA	EIN	WAC	ZÜR
1	(Czechoslovakia) Inter Bratislava	6	4	1	1	18	11	+7	9	—	2–5	4–2	5–0
2	(West Germany) Eintracht Frankfurt	6	2	3	1	13	8	+5	7	2–2	—	1–1	4–1
3	(Austria) SSW Innsbruck	6	2	2	2	10	10	0	6	1–3	1–1	—	3–0
4	(Switzerland) Zürich	6	1	0	5	4	16	−12	2	1–2	1–0	1–2	—

Source: mogiel.net
Rules for classification: 1) Points; 2) Goal difference; 3) Goals scored; 4) Head-to-head points; 5) Away goals scored; 6) Draw.

25 June 1977
Round 1

Eintracht Frankfurt (West Germany)	2–2	(Czechoslovak Socialist Republic) Inter Bratislava
Nickel 44' (1:1); Beverungen 58' (2:2)	Report	25' (0:1) Brezík; 49' (1:2) Mráz

Waldstadion, Frankfurt, West Germany
Attendance: 4,000
Referee: Linn

2 July 1977
Round 1

Inter Bratislava (Czechoslovakia)	5–0	(Switzerland) Zürich
(1:0) (2:0) (3:0) (4:0) (5:0)	FCZ summary

Bratislava
Attendance: 2,600

2 July 1977
Round 2

SSW Innsbruck (Austria)	1–1	(West Germany) Eintracht Frankfurt
Šikić 7' (1:0)	Report	53' (o.g. 1:1) Stering

Tivoli, Innsbruck, Austria
Attendance: 15,000
Referee: Latzin

9 July 1977
Round 2

Eintracht Frankfurt (West Germany)	4–1	(Switzerland) Zürich
Hölzenbein 26' (1:0); Kraus 65' (2:1); Hölzenbein 80' (3:1); Neuberger 86' (4:1)	FCZ summary Eintracht summary	57' (1:1) Torstensson

Waldstadion, Frankfurt
Attendance: 5,500
Referee: (West Germany) Heinz Aldinger (Waiblingen)

9 July 1977
Round 2

SSW Innsbruck	1–3	Inter Bratislava
Goal		Goal

Tivoli, Innsbruck

16 July 1977
Round 3

Zürich (Switzerland)	1–2	(Czechoslovakia) Inter Bratislava
Cucinotta 11' (pen 1:1)	FCZ summary	3' (0:1) Brezik; 75' (1:2) Ladislav Petráš

Letzigrund, Zürich
Attendance: 2,500
Referee: (Switzerland) Rudolf Renggli (Luzern)

16 July 1977
Round 4

Eintracht Frankfurt (West Germany)	1–1	(Austria) SSW Innsbruck
Hölzenbein 12' (pen.)	Report	9' (0:1) Welzl

Waldstadion, Frankfurt, West Germany
Attendance: 5,000
Referee: Dreher

20 July 1977
Round 4

Zürich (Switzerland)	1–0	(West Germany) Eintracht Frankfurt
Cucinotta 10' (1:0)	FCZ summary Eintracht summary

Letzigrund, Zürich
Attendance: 3,500
Referee: (Switzerland) Ernst Dörflinger (Grenchen)

20 July 1977
Round 4

Inter Bratislava	4–2	SSW Innsbruck
Goal		Goal

Bratislava

23 July 1977
Round 5

SSW Innsbruck (Austria)	3–0	(Switzerland) Zürich
Welzl 29' (1:0); Zanon 35' (2:0); Lercher 45' (pen.)	FCZ summary

Tivoli, Innsbruck
Attendance: 5,000
Referee: (Austria) Wolfgang Klocker

23 July 1977
Round 6

Inter Bratislava (Czechoslovak Socialist Republic)	2–5	(West Germany) Eintracht Frankfurt
Hudec 63'; Šimončič 88'	Report	7', 11' Wenzel; 44', 78', 83' Hölzenbein

Attendance: 5,000
Referee: Jarsa

30 July 1977
Round 6

Zürich (Switzerland)	1–2	(Austria) SSW Innsbruck
Moser 65' (1:2)	FCZ summary	12' (0:1) Oberacher; 52' (0:2) Oberacher

Letzigrund, Zürich
Attendance: 2,800
Referee: (Switzerland) René Kellenberger (Herisau)

=== Group 4 ===
Pos	Team	Pld	W	D	L	GF	GA	GD	Pts	SLA	MAL	HAM	GCZ
1	(Bulgaria) Slavia Sofia	6	5	0	1	13	7	+6	10	—	1–0	3–0	2–1
2	(Sweden) Malmö FF	6	3	2	1	12	4	+8	8	3–0	—	5–0	1–0
3	(West Germany) Hamburg	6	2	1	3	11	15	−4	5	2–3	2–2	—	4–1
4	(Switzerland) Grasshopper Club	6	0	1	5	5	15	−10	1	1–4	1–1	1–3	—

Source: mogiel.net
Rules for classification: 1) Points; 2) Goal difference; 3) Goals scored; 4) Head-to-head points; 5) Away goals scored; 6) Draw.

=== Group 5 ===
Pos	Team	Pld	W	D	L	GF	GA	GD	Pts	SLA	LEG	YB	LAN
1	(Czechoslovakia) Slavia Prague	6	4	2	0	23	8	+15	10	—	1–1	5–0	6–1
2	(Poland) Legia Warsaw	6	3	3	0	11	6	+5	9	2–2	—	4–1	1–0
3	(Switzerland) Young Boys	6	1	1	4	8	16	−8	3	1–4	1–1	—	4–0
4	(Sweden) Landskrona	6	1	0	5	7	19	−12	2	3–5	1–2	2–1	—

Source: mogiel.net
Rules for classification: 1) Points; 2) Goal difference; 3) Goals scored; 4) Head-to-head points; 5) Away goals scored; 6) Draw.

=== Group 6 ===
Pos	Team	Pld	W	D	L	GF	GA	GD	Pts	FRE	RUC	RIJ	GRA
1	(Denmark) Frem	6	4	1	1	16	4	+12	9	—	3–0	2–0	6–0
2	(Poland) Ruch Chorzów	6	4	0	2	14	8	+6	8	2–1	—	2–4	5–0
3	(Socialist Federal Republic of Yugoslavia) Rijeka	6	2	2	2	10	8	+2	6	2–2	0–1	—	1–1
4	(Austria) GAK	6	0	1	5	1	21	−20	1	0–2	0–4	0–3	—

Source: mogiel.net
Rules for classification: 1) Points; 2) Goal difference; 3) Goals scored; 4) Head-to-head points; 5) Away goals scored; 6) Draw.

=== Group 7 ===
Pos	Team	Pld	W	D	L	GF	GA	GD	Pts	TRE	ZSO	LIL	LIN
1	(Czechoslovakia) Jednota Trenčín	6	5	0	1	18	6	+12	10	—	3–0	5–1	4–0
2	(Poland) Zagłębie Sosnowiec	6	5	0	1	13	4	+9	10	2–0	—	3–0	3–0
3	(Norway) Lillestrøm	6	1	0	5	5	15	−10	2	2–3	0–2	—	1–0
4	(Austria) LASK	6	1	0	5	4	15	−11	2	1–3	1–3	2–1	—

Source: mogiel.net
Rules for classification: 1) Points; 2) Goal difference; 3) Goals scored; 4) Head-to-head points; 5) Away goals scored; 6) Draw.

=== Group 8 ===
Pos	Team	Pld	W	D	L	GF	GA	GD	Pts	SLO	HER	B03	ADM
1	(Czechoslovakia) Slovan Bratislava	6	4	1	1	16	8	+8	9	—	2–1	3–1	5–1
2	(West Germany) Hertha Berlin	6	3	2	1	6	2	+4	8	3–0	—	0–0	1–0
3	(Denmark) B 1903	6	0	4	2	4	7	−3	4	1–1	0–1	—	1–0
4	(Austria) Admira/Wacker Wien	6	0	3	3	4	13	−9	3	1–5	0–0	1–1	—

Source: mogiel.net
Rules for classification: 1) Points; 2) Goal difference; 3) Goals scored; 4) Head-to-head points; 5) Away goals scored; 6) Draw.

=== Group 9 ===
Pos	Team	Pld	W	D	L	GF	GA	GD	Pts	ÖST	BRN	SAL	AAL
1	(Sweden) Öster	6	4	2	0	13	7	+6	10	—	4–2	1–0	2–2
2	(Czechoslovakia) Zbrojovka Brno	6	4	0	2	14	9	+5	8	1–2	—	3–1	2–1
3	Austria Salzburg	6	0	3	3	5	9	−4	3	1–1	1–2	—	1–1
4	(Denmark) AaB	6	0	3	3	6	13	−7	3	1–3	0–4	1–1	—

Source: mogiel.net
Rules for classification: 1) Points; 2) Goal difference; 3) Goals scored; 4) Head-to-head points; 5) Away goals scored; 6) Draw.

=== Group 10 ===
Pos	Team	Pld	W	D	L	GF	GA	GD	Pts	PSZ	KB	STU	CHÊ
1	(Poland) Pogoń Szczecin	6	3	3	0	11	4	+7	9	—	2–2	1–0	6–1
2	(Denmark) KB	6	1	4	1	8	10	−2	6	1–1	—	2–1	0–0
3	(Austria) Sturm Graz	6	2	1	3	10	6	+4	5	0–0	5–2	—	4–0
4	(Switzerland) Chênois	6	1	2	3	3	12	−9	4	0–0	1–1	1–0	—

Source: mogiel.net
Rules for classification: 1) Points; 2) Goal difference; 3) Goals scored; 4) Head-to-head points; 5) Away goals scored; 6) Draw.

== See also ==
- 1977–78 European Cup
- 1977–78 UEFA Cup Winners' Cup
- 1977–78 UEFA Cup
