= Antonio Delgado (athlete) =

Spanish Paralympic athlete (1957–2021)

Medal record

Men's paralympic athletics

Representing Spain

Paralympic Games
Gold medal – first place	1976 Toronto	100 m F
Gold medal – first place	1976 Toronto	Long jump F
Silver medal – second place	1988 Seoul	Long jump B1
Bronze medal – third place	1984 New York/ Stoke Mandeville	Long jump B1

Antonio Delgado Palomo (20 September 1957 – 1 April 2021), also known as Antonio Delgado, was a track and field athlete from Spain. He had a disability. He competed at the 1976 Summer Paralympics, winning a gold medal in 100 metre race and first in the long jump.

He was born in Seville on 20 September 1957 and died on 1 April 2021 at the age of 63 from throat cancer.
