= Julio Gutiérrez =

Julio Gutiérrez may refer to:

- Julio Gutiérrez (musician) (1918–1990), Cuban pianist
- Julio Gutiérrez (footballer) (born 1979), Chilean footballer
- Julio Andrés Gutiérrez (born 1983), Uruguayan footballer
- Julio Gutiérrez (athlete), Spanish track and field athlete
- Julio César Gutiérrez Vega, Mexican physicist
