= Italy at the 1976 Summer Paralympics =

Italian delegation to sporting event

- IPC code: ITA
- NPC: Comitato Italiano Paralimpico
- Website: www.comitatoparalimpico.it (in Italian)

in Toronto
- Medals Ranked 25th: Gold 2 Silver 5 Bronze 11 Total 18

Summer Paralympics appearances (overview)
- 1960; 1964; 1968; 1972; 1976; 1980; 1984; 1988; 1992; 1996; 2000; 2004; 2008; 2012; 2016; 2020; 2024

Italy sent a delegation to compete at the 1976 Summer Paralympics in Toronto, Ontario, Canada. Its athletes finished twenty fifth in the overall medal count.

== Medalists ==
The Italian Paralympic team obtained the following medals:

Athlete	Sport	Event
GOLD
Lina Franzese	Athletics	100 m
Lina Franzese	Athletics	1500 m
SILVER
Carmelo Addaris	Athletics	60 m 1B
Carmelo Addaris	Athletics	
Carlo Jannucci	Athletics	400 m 2
Vittorio Loi	Fencing	Foil
Dario Bandinelli	Swimming	25 m freestyle 1B
BRONZE
Rosa Sicari	Athletics	60 m 1B
Rosa Sicari	Athletics	
Carlo Jannucci	Athletics	200 m 2
Carlo Jannucci	Athletics	
Giuseppe Trieste	Athletics	400 m 2
Giuliano Koten	Fencing	Épée
Giovanni Ferraris; Giuliano Koten; Vittorio Loi	Fencing	Foil team
Giuliano Koten; Vittorio Loi; Roberto Marson; Oliver Venturi	Fencing	Épée team
Dario Bandinelli	Swimming	25 m backstroke 1B
Rosa Sicari	Swimming	25 m freestyle 1B
Rosa Sicari	Table tennis	Individual 1B

== See also ==
- 1976 Summer Paralympics
- Italy at the 1976 Summer Olympics
