= Yisachar Navon =

Israeli Paralympic athlete

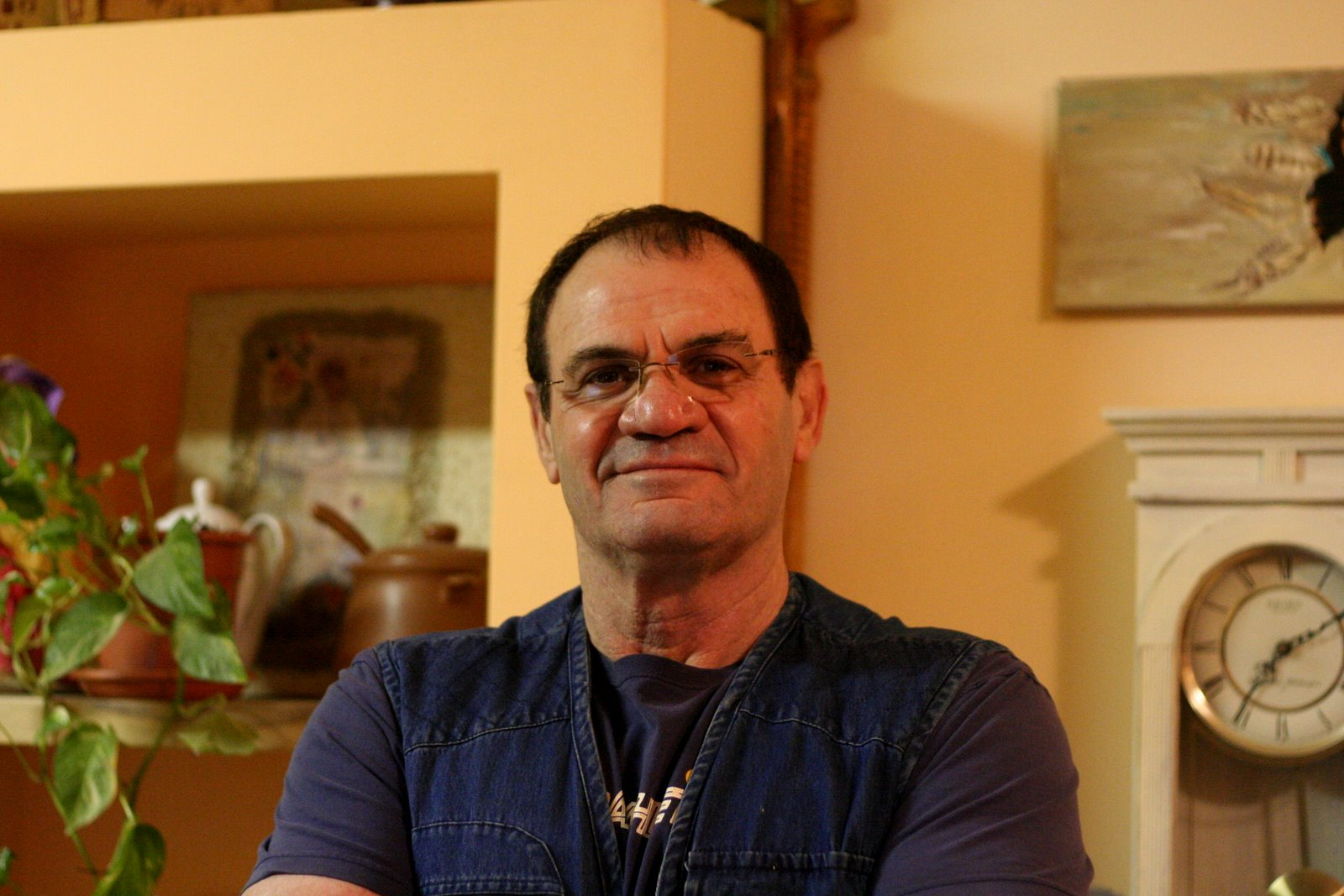

Personal information
- Native name: יששכר נבון
Medal record
Event / 1st / 2nd / 3rd; Paralympic Games / 1 / 0 / 4
Representing Israel
Paralympic Games
Men's para athletics
Gold medal – first place	1976 New York	Discus throw D
Bronze medal – third place	1976 New York	Shot put D
Bronze medal – third place	1980 Arnhem	Pentathlon D
Bronze medal – third place	1980 Arnhem	Discus throw D
Bronze medal – third place	1984 Stoke Mandville	Shot put A2

Yisachar Navon (Hebrew: יששכר נבון) is a former Paralympic athlete representing Israel.

Navon was born in Romania and emigrated with his family at the age of five, settling in Gal On. He completed military service in the Nahal Brigade and while in reserves he took part in the Six Day War and the War of Attrition.

At the Yom Kippur War he was severely injured in his left leg, causing it to be amputated above the knee.

Taking up Paralympic sports, he competed at the Stoke Mandeville Games and other international tournaments.

He competed in men's para athletics events and gained five Paralympic medals for discus throw (gold medal in 1976 and bronze medal in 1980), pentathlon (bronze medal in 1980) and shot put (bronze medals in 1976 and 1984). He competed at the 1980 Summer Paralympics in shot put (8th place) and at the 1984 Summer Paralympics in discus throw (5th place). Navon also competed in precision javelin in 1976, finishing in 18th place.

Navon is a certified personal trainer and reflexologist and lives in Tel Aviv with his wife and three daughters.

== See also ==
- Israel at the 1976 Summer Paralympics
- Israel at the 1980 Summer Paralympics
- Israel at the 1984 Summer Paralympics
