= Waltraud Hagenlocher =

German paralympic athlete

Personal information
- Born: 29 January 1945 Renningen, West Germany
- Died: 26 January 2012 (aged 66)

Sport
- Country: West Germany
- Sport: Para archery Para athletics Para cross-country skiing
Medal record
Representing West Germany
Summer Paralympics
Para archery
Silver medal – second place	1976 Toronto	Short metric round
Para athletics
Gold medal – first place	1980 Arnhem	Pentathlon 3
Silver medal – second place	1972 Heidelberg	4x40m relay open
Silver medal – second place	1976 Toronto	Javelin 3
Silver medal – second place	1976 Toronto	Pentathlon 3
Silver medal – second place	1976 Toronto	Shot put 3
Silver medal – second place	1980 Arnhem	Shot put 3
Silver medal – second place	1984 Stoke Mandeville/New York	Pentathlon 3
Bronze medal – third place	1976 Toronto	Discus throw 3
Bronze medal – third place	1980 Arnhem	4x60m relay 2-5
Bronze medal – third place	1984 Stoke Mandeville/New York	Discus throw 3
Bronze medal – third place	1984 Stoke Mandeville/New York	Shot put 3
Winter Paralympics
Para cross-country skiing
Silver medal – second place	1988 Innsbruck	Short distance 2.5km I
Silver medal – second place	1988 Innsbruck	Long distance 5km I

Waltraud Hagenlocher (29 January 1945 – 26 January 2012) was a German paralympic athlete. She won fourteen medals.

In 1980, she was awarded the silver medal for disabled sports. Between 1989 and 1994, she sat on the Renningen city council for the Free Voters association.

== Career ==
Hagenlocher competed at the 1968 Summer Paralympics in Tel Aviv in the shot put (eighth place), over 60 meters (ninth place), javelin throw (22nd), club throw (25th) and precision throw (46th). In June 1969 she developed bone cancer, and her left leg was amputated up to the hip. After rehabilitation, Hagenlocher resumed training in Bad Wildbad.

At the 1972 Summer Paralympics in Heidelberg, she won the silver medal with the 4 x 40 meter relay teamed with Rita Laux, Martina Tschötschel and Elke Wenzel. She also placed fourth in the shot put and javelin throw, and competed in the pentathlon (seventh place), in the discus throw (eighth place) and in the slalom (ninth place).

At the 1976 Summer Paralympics in Toronto, she was able to win five medals: Hagenlocher won silver in the shot put, javelin throw, pentathlon, and bronze in the discus throw. She was eliminated in the preliminary round in the wheelchair speed race over 60 meters. In addition, she took part in the archery competitions, and won the silver medal in the short metric round, behind her compatriot S. Battran.

At the 1980 Summer Paralympics in Arnhem, Hagenlocher won the only Paralympic gold of her career in the pentathlon of shot put, javelin throw, discus throw, swimming and speed wheelchair. She also won silver in the shot put, and the bronze medal together with the 4 x 60 meters relay, teamed with Errol Marklein, S. Roelli and C. Zeyher. She came eighth in the javelin throw, and ninth in the discus throw, while she did not get past the preliminary rounds in the 60, 200 and 400 meters.

At the 1984 Summer Paralympics in New York City and Stoke Mandeville, Hagenlocher won silver in the pentathlon, and two bronze medals in the discus throw, and shot put. She also took part in the javelin throw (fourth place) and over 100, 200 and 400 meters (each out in the preliminary round).

At the 1988 Winter Paralympics in Innsbruck, she also won two silver medals, in cross-country skiing over the short distance (2.5 km), and the long distance (5 km).

== Legacy ==
Hagenlocher succumbed to cancer a few days before her 67th birthday. In 2015, Hagenlocher was honored with a special exhibition in her home town of Renningen.
