= France at the 1976 Summer Paralympics =

- IPC code: FRA
- NPC: French Paralympic and Sports Committee
- Website: france-paralympique.fr

in Toronto
- Competitors: 52 in 9 sports
- Medals Ranked 8th: Gold 23 Silver 21 Bronze 14 Total 58

Summer Paralympics appearances (overview)
- 1960; 1964; 1968; 1972; 1976; 1980; 1984; 1988; 1992; 1996; 2000; 2004; 2008; 2012; 2016; 2020; 2024

France sent a delegation to compete at the 1976 Summer Paralympics in Toronto, Ontario, Canada. Its athletes finished eight in the overall medal count.

== Medalists ==
Medal	Name	Sport	Event
Gold	Gino Maraschin; A. Piutti; Thore	Archery	Men's advanced metric round team open
Gold	J. M. Chapuis; A. Galea; Malgogne	Archery	Men's novice and tetraplegics round team A-C
Gold	J. M. Chapuis	Archery	Men's novice round open
Gold	Mireille Maraschin	Archery	Women's advanced metric round open
Gold	Cailloux	Athletics	Men's 100m E1
Gold	B. Perry	Athletics	Men's 100m F1
Gold	J. Alexandre	Athletics	Men's 1500m F
Gold	B. Perry	Athletics	Men's 1500m F1
Gold	A. Piutti; Thore	Dartchery	Men's pairs open
Gold	P. Chassagne; Leon Sur	Lawn bowls	Men's pairs D
Gold	B. Perry	Swimming	Men's 50m freestyle F1
Gold	B. Perry	Swimming	Men's 50m backstroke F1
Gold	Robert Gallais	Swimming	Men's 100m backstroke C
Gold	Villatte	Swimming	Men's 100m backstroke D
Gold	B. Perry	Swimming	Men's 100m individual medley F1
Gold	Heller	Swimming	Women's 100m butterfly 6
Silver	Thore	Archery	Men's advanced metric round open
Silver	A. Galea	Archery	Men's novice round open
Silver	Leon Sur	Athletics	Men's javelin throw D
Silver	Cailloux	Swimming	Men's 50m backstroke E1
Silver	A. Maillet	Swimming	Men's 150m individual medley D1
Silver	Villatte	Swimming	Men's 200m individual medley D
Silver	Tournier	Swimming	Women's 25m freestyle 1B
Silver	Heller	Swimming	Women's 100m freestyle 6
Silver	Heller	Swimming	Women's 100m backstroke 6
Silver	P. Chassagne	Table tennis	Men's singles D
Silver	Maguy Ramousse	Table tennis	Women's singles 2
Silver	Jean-Michel Barberane	Weightlifting	Men's light featherweight
Silver	Joseph Ponnier	Weightlifting	Men's featherweight
Silver	Alex Eguers	Weightlifting	Men's lightweight
Silver	Aoudmond	Weightlifting	Men's middleweight
Bronze	P. Morel	Athletics	Men's javelin throw 5
Bronze	A. Maillet	Swimming	Men's 50m freestyle D1
Bronze	Finck	Swimming	Men's 100m backstroke C1
Bronze	Raffin	Swimming	Men's 25m breaststroke 1A
Bronze	A. Maillet	Swimming	Men's 50m breaststroke D1
Bronze	Robert Gallais	Swimming	Men's 100m breaststroke C
Bronze	Finck	Swimming	Men's 100m breaststroke C1
Bronze	Villatte	Swimming	Men's 100m breaststroke D
Bronze	Robert Gallais	Swimming	Men's 200m individual medley C
Bronze	Vaccara	Swimming	Men's 400m individual medley A
Bronze	Maguy Ramousse	Table tennis	Women's teams 2

== See also ==
- France at the Paralympics
- France at the 1976 Summer Olympics
