= Avraham Levi =

Israeli Paralympic athlete

Personal information
- Native name: אברהם לוי
- Born: 4 April 1944
- Died: 19 April 2022 (aged 78)
Medal record
Event / 1st / 2nd / 3rd; Paralympic Games / 2 / 0 / 0
Representing Israel
Paralympic Games
Men's para athletics
Gold medal – first place	1976 Toronto	Precision Javelin J
Gold medal – first place	1976 Toronto	Javelin J

Avraham Levi (Hebrew: אברהם לוי; 4 April 1944 – 19 April 2022) was an Israeli paralympic athlete who competed at the 1976 Summer Paralympics in para swimming and para athletics.

Levi fought in the Six Day War and was severely injured when his tank hit a landmine and caught fire. He was hospitalized for a year and had three limbs amputated, losing both his legs and one of his arms.

Levi competed at the 1976 Summer Paralympics as an amputee. He took part in three tournaments: He was the sole competitor in category J for javelin throw and precision javelin, thus winning gold medals in both competitions. In swimming, he competed under category D1 and took part in the 50m breaststroke tournament, reaching sixth place.

== See also ==
- Israel at the 1976 Summer Paralympics
