= Dennis Miller (Paralympian) =

New Zealand Paralympian

Sport
- Country: New Zealand
- Sport: Athletics, Table Tennis
Medal record
Men's para athletics
Representing New Zealand
Paralympic Games
Gold medal – first place	1976 Toronto	60m 1C
Gold medal – first place	1976 Toronto	Slalom 1C
Gold medal – first place	1980 Arnhem	Slalom 1C
Gold medal – first place	1984 New York & Stoke Mandeville	Slalom 1C
Bronze medal – third place	1980 Arnhem	60m 1C

Dennis Miller is a New Zealand Paralympian who competed in athletics and table tennis. At the 1976 Summer Paralympics, he won gold medals in the 60m 1C and Slalom 1C. At the 1980 Summer Paralympics, he won a gold medal in the Slalom 1C, and a bronze medal in the 60m 1C. At the 1984 Summer Paralympics, he won a gold medal in the Slalom 1C. He also competed at the 1972 Summer Paralympics.
