= Julio Gutiérrez (athlete) =

Spanish Paralympic athlete

Personal information
- Full name: Julio Gutiérrez García
- Born: Madrid, Spain
Medal record
Men's para-athletics
Representing Spain
Paralympic Games
Silver medal – second place	1976 Toronto	Long jump B

Julio Gutiérrez García (born in Madrid) is a track and field athlete from Spain. He has a vision impairment and is B2/T12 type athlete. He competed at the 1976 Summer Paralympics, winning silver in the long jump.
