= Eloy Guerrero =

Spanish Paralympic athlete (born 1962)

Eloy Guerrero Asensio (born 16 June 1953 in Esparragosa de Lares (Badajoz)) is a track and field athlete from Spain. He has a disability and is a T42 type athlete. He competed at the 1976 Summer Paralympics, winning a silver medal in one race.
