= Thea Engelbertink =

Dutch Paralympian

Thea Engelbertinki is a Dutch Paralympian.

She competed at the 1976 Summer Paralympics, winning a gold medal in discus throw and javelin while winning a silver medal in the shot put.

== See also ==
- Paralympic sports
- Sport in the Netherlands
