= Reidun Laengen =

Norwegian cross-country skier

Personal information
- Born: 3 December 1948 Vågå Municipality, Norway
- Died: 9 October 1995 (aged 46)

Sport
- Sport: Para cross-country skiing Paralympic athletics
Medal record
Representing Norway
Winter Paralympics
Para cross-country skiing
Gold medal – first place	1976 Ornskoldsvik	10km B
Silver medal – second place	1976 Ornskoldsvik	5km B
Silver medal – second place	1976 Ornskoldsvik	3x5km relay A-B
Summer Paralympics
Paralympic athletics
Gold medal – first place	1976 Toronto	100m B
Gold medal – first place	1976 Toronto	Long jump B

Reidun Berit Laengen (3 December 1948 – 9 October 1995) was a visually impaired Norwegian Paralympic athlete. She competed in cross-country skiing in the Paralympic Winter Games and athletics in the Paralympic Summer Games. She has a total of 3 golds and two silver medals .

== Career ==
At the 1976 Paralympic Winter Games, she won a gold medal in cross-country skiing 10 kilometers B, silver medal in cross-country skiing, 5 kilometers B, and silver medal in cross-country skiing, 3 x 5 km relay (together with Aud Grundvik and Aud Berntsen ).

At the 1976 Paralympic Summer Games, she won two gold medals in 100 meters B, and long jump B.
