= Paul Chambers (Paralympian) =

New Zealand Paralympian athlete

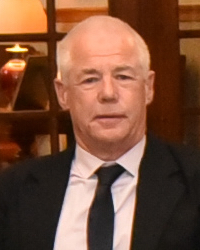
- Chambers in 2020

Personal information
- Nationality: New Zealander

Sport
- Sport: Athletics; Swimming
Medal record
Men's para swimming
Representing New Zealand
Paralympic Games
Gold medal – first place	1980 Arnhem	100 m Breaststroke 4
Bronze medal – third place	1976 Toronto	100 m Breaststroke 4

Paul Chambers is a former New Zealand Paralympic athlete. In the 1980 Summer Paralympics he won a gold medal in Men's 100 metres breaststroke 4.
