= Bill Lean =

New Zealand Paralympic athlete

Personal information
- Full name: William Lean
- Nationality: New Zealander
- Born: 1941 Dunedin, New Zealand
- Died: 2 April 2015 (aged 73) Dunedin, New Zealand

Sport
- Sport: Archery; Athletics; Dartchery; Table tennis
Medal record
Men's para athletics
Representing New Zealand
Paralympic Games
Gold medal – first place	1976 Toronto	Men's shot put 4

William Lean (1941–2015) was a New Zealand Paralympic athlete from Dunedin. In the 1968 Summer Paralympics, he competed in archery, athletics, dartchery and table tennis. In the 1976 Summer Paralympics, he competed in athletics, table tennis and weightlifting, winning a gold medal in Athletics in the Men's Shot Put 4.

Lean qualified for the 1976 Games earlier in the year at the Commonwealth Paraplegic Games. He was one of six members of the team to qualify for Toronto at the event.

Lean would go on to be selected to represent New Zealand for the 1980 Summer Paralympics, but had to miss those Games because of a heart problem. Having made his debut at the 1968 Games, Lean was his country's seventh ever Paralympian. When he died in 2015, NZ Paralympics said of him,

The Paralympics New Zealand Board and Staff wishes to pass our condolences on to the family of Bill Lean. Sadly Bill passed away on 2 April 2015 aged 73, after a short illness. Bill made his Paralympic debut in Israel's 1968 Paralympic Games, this was the first team that Paralympics New Zealand sent to a Paralympic Games. He then went on to compete at the Toronto 1976 Paralympic Games, where he won a Gold medal in the Men's Shot, Put 4, and set a new World Record. Bill continued to represent New Zealand at the Holland's 1980 Paralympic Games where unfortunately he could not compete due to heart problems. Bill was a very talented Paralympian competing in a variety of sports including Archery, Athletics, Bowls and Table Tennis. Bill was New Zealand's seventh Paralympian. Bill is to be commended and remembered as it is early Paralympians such as Bill that had paved the way for future Paralympians to succeed today and in the future...

Lean had taken up sport following an accident where he fell from a tree as a 19-year-old. Sports played a key role in his rehabilitation. He made his international debut in 1966. He went to Toronto after having won gold at the 1974 Commonwealth Paraplegic Games in Dunedin, where he set a world record lift of 202.50 kg in the heavyweight class. He also competed at the 1966 Commonwealth Paraplegic Games in Jamaica.
