= Doug Lyons =

Canadian paralympic athlete and weightlifter

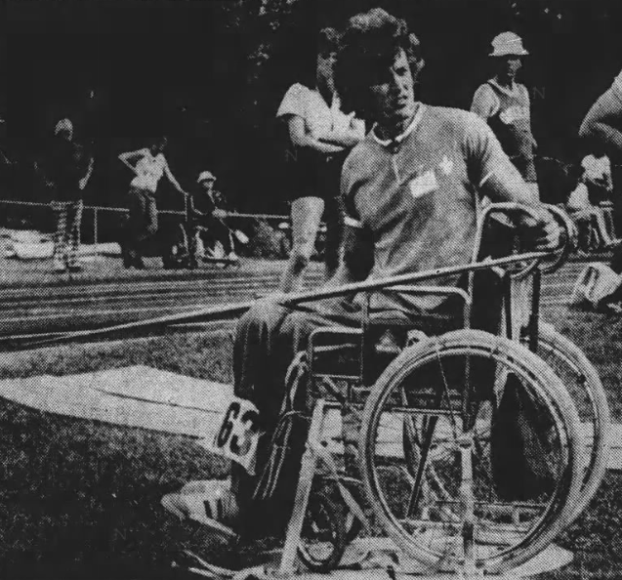
- Lyons in 1976

Personal information
- Born: 1939 or 1940 (age 85–86)

Sport
- Country: Canada
- Sport: Para-athletics; Weightlifting
Medal record
Representing Canada
Paralympic Games
Para-athletics
Bronze medal – third place	1976 Toronto	Men's discus throw 2
Gold medal – first place	1976 Toronto	Men's shot put 2
Gold medal – first place	1980 Arnhem	Men's shot put 4

Doug Lyons (born 1939/1940) (Note: Lyons was 36 in 1976) is a Canadian paralympic athlete and weightlifter. He competed at the 1976 and 1980 Summer Paralympics.

== Life and career ==
Lyons was a police officer.

Lyons competed at the 1976 Summer Paralympics, winning a gold and bronze medal in athletics. He then competed at the 1980 Summer Paralympics, winning the gold medal in the men's shot put 4 event.
