= Mexico at the 1976 Summer Paralympics =

- IPC code: MEX
- NPC: Federacion Mexicana de Deporte

in Toronto
- Competitors: 32
- Medals Ranked 12th: Gold 16 Silver 14 Bronze 9 Total 39

Summer Paralympics appearances (overview)
- 1972; 1976; 1980; 1984; 1988; 1992; 1996; 2000; 2004; 2008; 2012; 2016; 2020; 2024

Mexico sent a delegation to compete at the 1976 Summer Paralympics in Toronto, Ontario, Canada. Its athletes finished twelfth in the overall medal count.

== Medalist ==
| Medal | Name | Sport | Event |
|---|---|---|---|
| Gold | Josefina Cornejo | Athletics | Women's 60m 1A |
| Gold | Josefina Cornejo | Athletics | Women's club throw 1A |
| Gold | Josefina Cornejo | Athletics | Women's discus throw 1A |
| Gold | Josefina Cornejo | Athletics | Women's pentathlon 1A |
| Gold | Eusebio Valdez | Athletics | Men's 200 m 2 |
| Gold | Eusebio Valdez | Athletics | Men's 400 m 2 |
| Gold | Eusebio Valdez | Athletics | Men's slalom 2 |
| Gold | Juan Almaraz | Athletics | Men's 60 m 1A |
| Gold | Juan Almaraz | Athletics | Men's slalom 1A |
| Gold | Eduardo Monsalvo | Athletics | Men's 60 m 1B |
| Gold | Eduardo Monsalvo | Athletics | Men's slalom 1B |
| Gold | Eduardo Monsalvo | Swimming | Men's 25m breaststroke 1B |
| Gold | Rubén Vázquez | Athletics | Men's club throw 1A |
| Gold | Martha Sandoval | Athletics | Women's 60m 1B |
| Gold | Martha Sandoval | Athletics | Women's club throw 1B |
| Gold | Martha Sandoval | Athletics | Women's discus throw 1B |
| Silver | Martha Sandoval | Athletics | Women's 25m breaststroke 1B |
| Silver | Martha Sandoval | Athletics | Women's 25m backstroke 1B |
| Silver | Martha Sandoval | Table Tennis | Women's individual 1C |
| Silver | Lourdes Morales | Athletics | Women's slalom 1A |
| Silver | Josefina Cornejo | Swimming | Women's 25m backstroke 1A |
| Silver | Josefina Cornejo | Athletics | Women's precision club throw 1A-1B |
| Silver | Francisco de las Fuentes | Athletics | Men's 60 m 1A |
| Silver | Eusebio Valdez | Athletics | Men's 100 m 2 |
| Silver | Sergio Zepeda | Athletics | Men's 400 m 3 |
| Silver | René Corona | Athletics | Men's 1500 m 4 |
| Silver | Mexican Team | Athletics | Men's 4×40m A-C |
| Silver | Antonio Castello | Swimming | Men's 100m backstroke 6 |
| Silver | Concepción Salguero | Athletics | Women's 200m 2 |
| Silver | Concepción Salguero | Athletics | Women's 400m 2 |
| Bronze | Concepción Salguero | Athletics | Women's 60m 2 |
| Bronze | Lourdes Morales | Athletics | Women's 60m 1A |
| Bronze | Rubén Vázquez | Athletics | Men's discus throw 1A |
| Bronze | Rubén Vázquez | Athletics | Men's shot put 1A |
| Bronze | Antonio Castello | Swimming | Men's 100m butterfly 6 |
| Bronze | Antonio Castello | Swimming | Men's Individual Medley 150 m 6 |
| Bronze | Eduardo Monsalvo | Swimming | Men's freestyle 25 m 1B |
| Bronze | René Corona Eusebio Valdez Roberto Vargas Sergio Zepeda | Athletics | Men's 4× 60m relay 2-5 |
| Bronze | Antonio Castello René Corona Miguel Ángel Gaona Óscar Villela | Swimming | Men's 4× 50m freestyle relay 2-6 |

Medals by sport
| Sport | 1st place, gold medalist(s) | 2nd place, silver medalist(s) | 3rd place, bronze medalist(s) | Total |
| Athletics | 15 | 11 | 5 | 31 |
| Swimming | 1 | 2 | 4 | 7 |
| Table Tennis | 0 | 1 | 0 | 1 |
| Total | 16 | 14 | 9 | 39 |

Multiple medalists
| Name | 1st place, gold medalist(s) | 2nd place, silver medalist(s) | 3rd place, bronze medalist(s) | Total |
| Josefina Cornejo | 4 | 2 | 0 | 6 |
| Martha Sandoval | 3 | 3 | 0 | 6 |
| Eusebio Valdez | 3 | 1 | 1 | 5 |
| Eduardo Monsalvo | 3 | 0 | 1 | 4 |
| Juan Almaraz | 2 | 0 | 0 | 2 |
| Rubén Vázquez | 1 | 0 | 2 | 3 |
| Concepción Salguero | 0 | 2 | 1 | 3 |
| Antonio Castello | 0 | 1 | 3 | 4 |
| René Corona | 0 | 1 | 2 | 3 |
| Lourdes Morales | 0 | 1 | 1 | 2 |
| Sergio Zepeda | 0 | 1 | 1 | 2 |

== See also ==
- 1976 Summer Paralympics
- Mexico at the 1976 Summer Olympics
