= Arnold Boldt =

Canadian Paralympic athlete

Personal information
- Full name: Arnold William Boldt
- Born: 16 September 1957 (age 69) Osler, Saskatchewan, Canada

Sport
- Country: Canada
- Sport: Athletics; Para-cycling
Medal record
Representing Canada
Paralympic Games
Athletics
Gold medal – first place	1976 Toronto	Men's High Jump D
Gold medal – first place	1976 Toronto	Men's Long Jump D
Gold medal – first place	1980 Arnhem	Men's High Jump D
Gold medal – first place	1980 Arnhem	Men's Long Jump D
Gold medal – first place	1984 New York / Stoke Mandeville	Men's High Jump A2
Gold medal – first place	1988 Seoul	Men's High Jump A2A9
Gold medal – first place	1992 Barcelona	Men's High Jump J1
Silver medal – second place	1988 Seoul	Men's Long Jump A2A9

Arnold William Boldt, OC (born 16 September 1957) is a Paralympics athlete from Canada. A leg amputee, he won seven gold medals in the Paralympic Games in the high jump and long jump. Boldt was inducted into the Canadian Sports Hall of Fame in 1977 and the Saskatchewan Sports Hall of Fame in 1980.

In 1979, a fictionalized account of Boldt's athletic career aired on CBC Television as the film Crossbar.

He returned to the Paralympic Games for the first time since 1992 by competing in the 2012 Summer Paralympics in para-cycling.

== Awards and honours ==
In 1994, Boldt was inducted into the Terry Fox Hall of Fame.
