= Denmark at the 1976 Summer Paralympics =

- IPC code: DEN
- NPC: Paralympic Committee Denmark
- Website: www.paralympic.dk

in Toronto
- Medals Ranked 24th: Gold 3 Silver 0 Bronze 3 Total 6

Summer Paralympics appearances (overview)
- 1968; 1972; 1976; 1980; 1984; 1988; 1992; 1996; 2000; 2004; 2008; 2012; 2016; 2020; 2024

Denmark sent a delegation to compete at the 1976 Summer Paralympics in Toronto, Ontario, Canada. Its athletes finished twenty fourth in the overall medal count.

== Medallists ==
Medal	Name	Sport	Event
Gold	John Nielsoen	Athletics	Men's 1,500 m E1
Gold	John Nielsoen	Athletics	Men's Football Accuracy E1
Gold	John Nielsoen	Athletics	Men's Football Distance E1
Bronze	Henning Erikson	Athletics	Men's 1,500 m Walk B
Bronze		Goalball	Men's tournament
Bronze	Bjalne Eriksen; Eric Funder	Table Tennis	Men's Doubles 1C

== See also ==
- 1976 Summer Paralympics
- Denmark at the 1976 Summer Olympics
