= Lidia ter Beek =

Dutch paralympian swimmer

Lidia ter Beek is a Dutch Paralympian.

She competed at the 1976 Summer Paralympics, winning a gold medal in 100 metre backstroke.

== See also ==
- Paralympic sports
- Sport in the Netherlands
