= Josefina Cornejo =

Mexican Paralympic athlete (born 1955)

Personal information
- Full name: Josefina Cornejo Martínez
- Born: 28 November 1955 (age 70) Guadalajara, Jalisco, Mexico

Sport
- Country: Mexico
- Sport: Paralympic athletics
Medal record
Representing Mexico
Summer Paralympics
Paralympic athletics
Gold medal – first place	1976 Toronto	Women's 60m 1A
Gold medal – first place	1976 Toronto	Women's club throw 1A
Gold medal – first place	1976 Toronto	Women's discus throw 1A
Gold medal – first place	1976 Toronto	Women's pentathlon 1A
Gold medal – first place	1980 Arnhem	Women's 60m 1A
Gold medal – first place	1980 Arnhem	Women's club throw 1A
Gold medal – first place	1980 Arnhem	Women's discus throw 1A
Gold medal – first place	1980 Arnhem	Women's shot put 1A
Silver medal – second place	1976 Toronto	Women's precision club throw 1A-1B
Silver medal – second place	1980 Arnhem	Women's slalom 1A
Paralympic swimming
Silver medal – second place	1976 Toronto	Women's 25m backstroke 1A
Silver medal – second place	1980 Arnhem	Women's 25m backstroke 1A
Silver medal – second place	1980 Arnhem	Women's 25m freestyle 1A
Para table tennis
Bronze medal – third place	1980 Arnhem	Women's singles 1A

Josefina Cornejo Martínez (Note: In this Mexican name, the surname is Cornejo and the second or maternal family name is Martínez.) (born 28 November 1955) is a Mexican retired Paralympic athlete that won 14 medals at the Summer Paralympics. She represented Mexico in the 1976 Summer Paralympics, where she won four gold and two silver medals, and in the 1980 Summer Paralympics, where she won four gold, three silver, and one bronze medals. She competed in parathletism, paraswimming and para table tennis events. She was included in Hall of Fame of the Mexican Sports Confederation in 1983.
