= Lina Franzese =

Italian Paralympic athlete

Lina Franzese is an Italian Paralympian.

She competed at the 1976 Summer Paralympics, winning a gold medal in 100 metres F1, and 1980 Summer Paralympics, winning a silver in 100 metres F1.

== See also ==
- Paralympic sports
- Sport in Italy
