= Finland at the 1976 Summer Paralympics =

- IPC code: FIN
- NPC: Finnish Paralympic Committee
- Website: www.paralympia.fi/en

in Toronto
- Competitors: 50 in 5 sports
- Medals Ranked 13th: Gold 12 Silver 20 Bronze 18 Total 50

Summer Paralympics appearances (overview)
- 1960; 1964; 1968; 1972; 1976; 1980; 1984; 1988; 1992; 1996; 2000; 2004; 2008; 2012; 2016; 2020; 2024

Finland competed at the 1976 Summer Paralympics in Toronto. The country was represented by 50 athletes (46 men and 4 women) competing in archery, athletics, dartchery, swimming, table tennis, volleyball, weightlifting and wheelchair basketball.

1976 marked Finland's first major success at the Summer Paralympics. In 1960, it had won a single gold medal. In 1968, having missed the 1964 Games, it won no medals at all; and in 1972, it obtained just two silver and a bronze. The Finnish medal haul at the Toronto Games thus marked an overwhelming improvement: Finnish athletes won a total of 50 medals, of which twelve gold, twenty silver and eighteen bronze.

== Notable results ==
Veikko Puputti, silver medallist in swimming in 1972, and Tauno Valkama, gold medallist in swimming in 1960, together won a silver medal in archery, as part of the men's team in the Short Metric open. The third member of their team was Hugo Illi. The trio scored a total of 1210 points, behind Great Britain's score of 1615. West Germany finished third with 951 points, but, as there were only three teams in contention, no bronze medal was awarded.

Pekka Kujala won three gold medals in men's athletics, category A: in the javelin, shot put and discus. Tauno Mannila mirrored his triple achievement in the C1 category. Together, they thus accounted for half of Finland's gold medals.

In dartchery, Elli Korva became Finland's first female Paralympic medallist, when she won silver in the mixed pairs open, along with male teammate Arvo Kalenius.

== See also ==
- Finland at the 1976 Summer Olympics
