= Austria at the 1976 Summer Paralympics =

- IPC code: AUT
- NPC: Austrian Paralympic Committee
- Website: www.oepc.at (in German)

in Toronto
- Medals Ranked 10th: Gold 17 Silver 16 Bronze 17 Total 50

Summer Paralympics appearances (overview)
- 1960; 1964; 1968; 1972; 1976; 1980; 1984; 1988; 1992; 1996; 2000; 2004; 2008; 2012; 2016; 2020; 2024

Austria sent a delegation to compete at the 1976 Summer Paralympics in Toronto, Ontario, Canada. Its athletes finished tenth in the overall medal count.

== See also ==
- 1976 Summer Paralympics
- Austria at the 1976 Summer Olympics
