= Japan at the 1976 Summer Paralympics =

- IPC code: JPN
- NPC: Japan Paralympic Committee
- Website: www.jsad.or.jp (in Japanese)

in Toronto
- Medals Ranked 15th: Gold 10 Silver 6 Bronze 3 Total 19

Summer Paralympics appearances (overview)
- 1964; 1968; 1972; 1976; 1980; 1984; 1988; 1992; 1996; 2000; 2004; 2008; 2012; 2016; 2020; 2024

Japan sent a delegation to compete at the 1976 Summer Paralympics in Toronto, Ontario, Canada. Its athletes finished fifteenth in the overall medal count.

== See also ==
- 1976 Summer Paralympics
- Japan at the 1976 Summer Olympics
