= United States at the 1976 Summer Paralympics =

- Flag of the United States
- IPC code: USA
- NPC: United States Paralympic Committee
- Website: www.teamusa.org/US-Paralympics

in Toronto
- Medals Ranked 1st: Gold 66 Silver 44 Bronze 45 Total 155

Summer Paralympics appearances (overview)
- 1960; 1964; 1968; 1972; 1976; 1980; 1984; 1988; 1992; 1996; 2000; 2004; 2008; 2012; 2016; 2020; 2024

The United States sent a delegation to compete at the 1976 Summer Paralympics in Toronto, Ontario, Canada. Its athletes finished first in the gold and overall medal count.

== See also ==
- 1976 Summer Paralympics
- United States at the 1976 Summer Olympics
