= Sweden at the 1976 Summer Paralympics =

- IPC code: SWE
- NPC: Swedish Parasports Federation

in Toronto
- Medals Ranked 9th: Gold 22 Silver 27 Bronze 24 Total 73

Summer Paralympics appearances (overview)
- 1960; 1964; 1968; 1972; 1976; 1980; 1984; 1988; 1992; 1996; 2000; 2004; 2008; 2012; 2016; 2020; 2024

Sweden sent a delegation to compete at the 1976 Summer Paralympics in Toronto, Canada. Its athletes finished ninth in the overall medal count.

== See also ==
- 1976 Summer Paralympics
- Sweden at the 1976 Summer Olympics
