= West Germany at the 1976 Summer Paralympics =

- Flag of Germany
- IPC code: FRG (GER used at these Games)
- NPC: National Paralympic Committee Germany
- Website: www.dbs-npc.de (in German)

in Toronto
- Medals Ranked 4th: Gold 37 Silver 34 Bronze 26 Total 97

Summer Paralympics appearances (overview)
- 1960; 1964; 1968; 1972; 1976; 1980; 1984; 1988; 1992; 1996; 2000; 2004; 2008; 2012; 2016; 2020; 2024

Other related appearances
- East Germany (1984)

West Germany sent a delegation to compete at the 1976 Summer Paralympics in Toronto, Canada. Its athletes finished fourth in the overall medal count.

== See also ==
- 1976 Summer Paralympics
- West Germany at the 1976 Summer Olympics
