= 1976 Summer Paralympics =

Multi-parasport event in Toronto, Canada

V Paralympic Games
- Location: Toronto, Canada
- Nations: 41
- Athletes: 1,657 (1,404 men, 253 women)
- Events: 448 in 13 sports
- Opening: 3 August
- Closing: 11 August
- Opened by: Lieutenant Governor Pauline McGibbon
- Stadium: Woodbine Racetrack; Centennial Park Stadium

The 1976 Summer Paralympics (French: Jeux paralympiques d'été de 1976), branded as Torontolympiad – 1976 Olympiad for the Physically Disabled, was the fifth Paralympic Games to be held. They were hosted by Toronto, Ontario, Canada, from 3 to 11 August 1976, marking the first time a Paralympics was held in the Americas and in Canada. The games began two days after the close of the 1976 Summer Olympics in Montreal.

== Context ==
This was the first time global politics interfered with the Paralympic Games. "The problem stemmed from the logic that admitting a team from South Africa was to give implicit approval for its government's attitude towards segregation and racism." Although the South African team at the time was a multi-racial one, the Canadian government withdrew its CAD 500.000 contribution and "matching amounts of funds were likely to be pulled out by the metropolitan government". The provincial government at Queen's Park eventually covered the tab.

Two groups, both with the same President - Ludwig Guttmann - were involved in the decision-making: the International Sports Organisation for the Disabled and the International Stoke Mandeville Games Federation. Guttman and Robert Jackson, Chairman of the Organizing Committee, worked to convince the Canadian government to honour their promises of support the teams without money to send their delegations and were largely successful. Nevertheless, a small number of African countries withdrew to participate in Paralympics, following on from the 1976 Summer Olympics when 25 countries boycotted the Games, and after this situation, those National Olympic Committees were threatened with exclusion from future events. Later, a series of efforts were made to develop a joint policy with the International Olympic Committee.

Rhodesia was not allowed to participate as the Canadian government refused to grant visas for the Rhodesian Paralympic team to attend the competition.

== Venues ==
The opening of the 1976 games was held at Woodbine Race Track in north Etobicoke. There was no athletes' village, so competitors were housed at collegial campus of York University (Keele campus), University of Toronto (St. George Campus), and the CNIB national headquarters. Israeli athletes were housed in a fourth secret venue due to the specific and undisclosed security concerns, and fear of a terrorist attack. Closing ceremonies and the athletics events took place at Centennial Park Stadium. Centennial Gymnasium and Centennial Park's Olympic Pool were the venues for the swimming events.

| Venue | City | Sports | Capacity | Ref. | | | | |
|---|---|---|---|---|---|---|---|---|
| Venue | City | Sports | Capacity | Ref. | Woodbine Racetrack | Toronto | Opening ceremony | 42,000 |
| Centennial Park Fields | Toronto | Archery; Dartchery | 5,000 | | | | | |
| Centennial Park Olympium | Toronto | Goaball; Swimming; Volleyball; Wheelchair basketball | 4,500 (swimming) | | | | | |
| Centennial Park Stadium | Toronto | Athletics; Closing ceremony | 2,200 | | | | | |
| Centennial Park West Arena | Toronto | Table tennis Weightlifting; Wheelchair fencing | 3,500 | | | | | |
| Etobicoke Lawn Bowling Club | Toronto | Lawn bowls | | | | | | |
| Seneca College | Toronto | Snooker | | | | | | |
| No. 2 Division Police Facilities | Toronto | Shooting | | | | | | |

== Media coverage ==
The 1976 games marked the first time that there was television coverage of Paralympic events. Some events were shown live, with daily bulletins shown to viewers in Southern Ontario. Within the Toronto area, a small consortium of local cable companies (including Trillium Cable and Rogers Cable) carried the games on channel 10 after CTV and Global TV declined to carry them.

== Sports ==
At the 1976 games, amputees and visually impaired athletes competed for the first time; previous editions of the Paralympic Games had included only wheelchair athletes. Within the sport of athletics, new wheelchair racing distances of 200 m, 400 m, 800 m and 1500 m were added. Shooting and goalball, both previously demonstration events, were included as official medal sports.

- Archery (18)
- Athletics (208)
- Dartchery (3)
- Goalball (1)
- Lawn bowls (16)
- Shooting (3)
- Snooker (2)
- Swimming (146)
- Table tennis (28)
- Volleyball (1)
- Weightlifting (6)
- Wheelchair basketball (2)
- Wheelchair fencing (14)

== Medal table ==
The top 10 NPCs by number of gold medals are listed below. The host nation, Canada, is highlighted.

| Rank | Nation | Gold | Silver | Bronze | Total |
|---|---|---|---|---|---|
| 1 | United States | 66 | 44 | 45 | 155 |
| 2 | Netherlands | 45 | 25 | 14 | 84 |
| 3 | Israel | 40 | 13 | 16 | 69 |
| 4 | West Germany | 37 | 34 | 26 | 97 |
| 5 | Great Britain | 29 | 28 | 37 | 94 |
| 6 | Canada* | 25 | 26 | 26 | 77 |
| 7 | Poland | 24 | 17 | 12 | 53 |
| 8 | France | 23 | 21 | 14 | 58 |
| 9 | Sweden | 21 | 28 | 25 | 74 |
| 10 | Austria | 17 | 16 | 17 | 50 |
| Totals (10 entries) | | 327 | 252 | 232 | 811 |

== Participating delegations ==
Forty-one delegations took part in the Toronto Paralympics. Burma, Colombia, Ecuador, Greece, Guatemala, Indonesia and Luxembourg made their first appearances.

South Africa was competing at the Paralympics for the fourth time. Although banned from the Olympic Games due to its policy of apartheid, it was not banned from the Paralympics until 1980, and Canada, as host country, did not object to its participation. These were, however, to be its last Paralympics before the dismantling of apartheid; The Netherlands, as hosts of the 1980 Games, declared South Africa's further participation "undesirable".

- Argentina (20)
- Australia (46)
- Austria (42)
- Bahamas (6)
- Belgium (45)
- Brazil (23)
- Burma (4)
- Canada (89)
- Colombia (11)
- Denmark (21)
- Ecuador (3)
- Egypt (27)
- Ethiopia (1)
- Fiji (9)
- Finland (50)
- France (52)
- Great Britain (87)
- Greece (3)
- Guatemala (11)
- Hong Kong (11)
- Hungary (2)
- Indonesia (12)
- Ireland (19)
- Israel (59)
- Italy (24)
- Japan (34)
- Luxembourg (3)
- Mexico (32)
- Netherlands (58)
- New Zealand (12)
- Norway (41)
- Peru (2)
- Poland (37)
- South Africa (37)
- South Korea (7)
- Spain (22)
- Sweden (69)
- Switzerland (49)
- Uganda (1)
- United States (97)
- West Germany (93)

== See also ==
- Canada at the Paralympics
- World Paralympiads in Canada
  - 1976 Summer Paralympics – Toronto
  - 2010 Winter Paralympics – Vancouver—Whistler
- 1976 Winter Paralympics
- 1976 Summer Olympics
- 2015 Parapan American Games

| Preceded by Heidelberg | Summer Paralympics; Toronto; V Paralympic Summer Games (1976) | Succeeded by Arnhem |
