= Athletics at the 1980 Summer Paralympics =

Athletics at the VI Paralympic Games
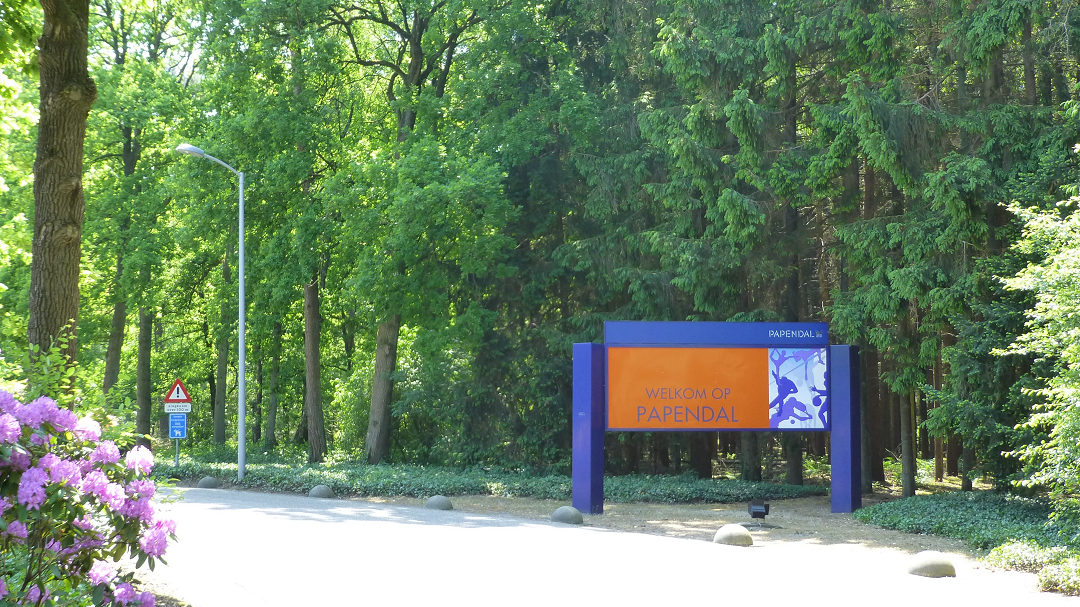
- Host stadium (shown in 2013)
- Competitors: 936 from 40 nations

Athletics at the 1980 Summer Paralympics consisted of 275 events. The Games saw 1,973 Para athletes from 43 countries compete in 13 sports.

The full list of sports was; archery, Para athletics, dartchery, lawn bowls, goalball, shooting Para sport, Para swimming, table tennis, sitting volleyball, weightlifting, wheelchair basketball, wheelchair fencing and wrestling.

The USA and Poland tied for the most gold medals in Arnhem, with USA taking 195 overall medals and Poland finishing with 177. Germany, Canada and Great Britain rounded out the top 5 on the medals chart. Bahamas, Jamaica, Kenya, Kuwait, Luxembourg, Sudan and Zimbabwe won their first ever medals in this competition.

== Participating nations ==
- Argentina (5)
- Australia (36)
- Austria (36)
- Bahamas (6)
- Belgium (37)
- Brazil (1)
- Canada (66)
- Colombia (8)
- Czechoslovakia (5)
- Denmark (25)
- Egypt (28)
- Finland (49)
- France (21)
- Great Britain (36)
- Greece (5)
- Hong Kong (6)
- Iceland (3)
- Indonesia (12)
- Ireland (17)
- Israel (14)
- Italy (28)
- Jamaica (13)
- Japan (24)
- Kenya (17)
- Kuwait (9)
- Luxembourg (2)
- Malta (3)
- Mexico (23)
- Netherlands (29)
- New Zealand (15)
- Norway (21)
- Poland (43)
- Spain (14)
- Sudan (10)
- Sweden (25)
- Switzerland (45)
- United States (95)
- West Germany (77)
- Yugoslavia (24)
- Zimbabwe (3)

== Medal summary ==
Rank	Nation	Gold	Silver	Bronze	Total
1	United States (USA)	42	46	28	116
2	Canada (CAN)	37	16	16	69
3	Poland (POL)	34	27	27	88
4	West Germany (FRG)	31	26	24	81
5	Mexico (MEX)	17	13	4	34
6	Great Britain (GBR)	12	6	4	22
7	Belgium (BEL)	11	7	8	26
8	Sweden (SWE)	10	5	4	19
9	France (FRA)	9	8	3	20
10	Norway (NOR)	9	2	1	12
11	Austria (AUT)	8	12	7	27
12	Australia (AUS)	8	9	17	34
13	Japan (JPN)	7	7	3	17
14	Finland (FIN)	6	14	10	30
15	Jamaica (JAM)	6	4	4	14
16	New Zealand (NZL)	5	4	4	13
17	Netherlands (NED)	4	8	11	23
18	Egypt (EGY)	4	4	2	10
19	Switzerland (SUI)	3	7	8	18
20	Denmark (DEN)	3	4	3	10
21	Italy (ITA)	2	3	5	10
22	Kuwait (KUW)	2	2	1	5
23	Israel (ISR)	1	7	9	17
24	Kenya (KEN)	1	2	0	3
25	Ireland (IRL)	1	0	9	10
26	Sudan (SUD)	1	0	0	1
27	Zimbabwe (ZIM)	0	4	0	4
28	Spain (ESP)	0	3	3	6
29	Yugoslavia (YUG)	0	1	5	6
30	Argentina (ARG)	0	1	3	4
31	Bahamas (BAH)	0	1	1	2
31	Hong Kong (HKG)	0	1	1	2
33	Greece (GRE)	0	0	1	1
33	Luxembourg (LUX)	0	0	1	1
Totals (34 entries)		274	254	227	755

=== Men's events ===
Event	Gold	Silver	Bronze
60 m 1A	Francisco de las Fuentes; Mexico	Gary Birch; Canada	Meinrad Cavigelli; Switzerland
60 m 1B	Leif Hedman; Sweden	Arturo Granados; Mexico	George Mouzakis; Greece
60 m 1C	Eduardo Monsalvo; Mexico	Pedro Sandoval; Mexico	D. Miller; New Zealand
60 m A	William McLeod; Great Britain	Melvin Copeland; United States	Ryszard Kozuch; Poland
80 m CP C	Andre Havard; France	Tony Harborn; Sweden	Bertil Swahn; Sweden
80 m CP D	Henrik Thomsen; Denmark	Duvivier; France	Arthur Graham; United States
100 m 2	Eusebio Valdez; Mexico	Shafy Meraweh; Kuwait	Gary Kerr; United States
100 m 3	Lars Lofstrom; Sweden	Marc de Vos; Belgium	Chris Alp; Australia
100 m 4	B. Parks; United States	Rolf Johansson; Sweden	Richard Oliver; Australia
100 m 5	M. de Meyer; Belgium	Mel Fitzgerald; Canada	Erich Hubel; Australia
100 m B	Jerzy Landos; Poland	Winford Haynes; United States	Jozef Pokrywka; Poland
100 m C	Magella Belanger; Canada	Tony Wills; Canada	Jo Egan; Australia
100 m C1	Denis Lapalme; Canada	Alois Karner; Austria	Henryk Piatkowski; Poland
100 m D	K. Wagner; West Germany	Joe Harrison; Canada	K. Will; West Germany
100 m D1 runners	Walter Fink; Austria	None	None
100 m D1 wheelchairs	Jim Martinson; United States	Curt Brinkman; United States	Walter Zierl; Austria
100 m E	Harri Jauhiainen; Finland	Jan Krauz; Poland	Wolfgang Pickl; Austria
100 m E1	Cato Zahl Pedersen; Norway	Yekutiel Gershoni; Israel	Marco Schmit; Luxembourg
100 m F	Wayne Lanham; Australia	Shing Chi Ko; Hong Kong	Gerhard Kolm; Austria
100 m F1	Matthias Berg; West Germany	Charles Peart; Canada	R. Scharmentke; West Germany
200 m 2	Eusebio Valdez; Mexico	Gary Kerr; United States	G. M. Oviedo; Mexico
200 m 3	Mike Nugent; Australia	Marc de Vos; Belgium	Chris Alp; Australia
400 m 2	Eusebio Valdez; Mexico	Gary Kerr; United States	Shafy Meraweh; Kuwait
400 m 3	Marc de Vos; Belgium	Mike Nugent; Australia	Fred Pointer; Australia
400 m A	Patrick York; Canada	Klaus Meyer; West Germany	J. W. Visser; Netherlands
400 m B	Jerzy Landos; Poland	Jozef Pokrywka; Poland	Freddy Matton; Belgium
400 m C	Jurgen Johann; West Germany	Karl Brunner; Austria	Joe Egan; Australia
400 m C1	Alois Karner; Austria	Mieczyslaw Maminski; Poland	None
400 m D	Joe Harrison; Canada	K. Will; West Germany	K. Wagner; West Germany
400 m D1 runners	Walter Fink; Austria	None	None
400 m D1 wheelchairs	Curt Brinkman; United States	Jim Martinson; United States	J. Finch; United States
400 m E	Harri Jauhiainen; Finland	Jan Krauz; Poland	R. Lindberg; Finland
400 m E1	Cato Zahl Pedersen; Norway	Yekutiel Gershoni; Israel	None
400 m F	Marian Wierzbicki; Poland	Wayne Lanham; Australia	Gerhard Kolm; Austria
400 m F1	Matthias Berg; West Germany	R. Scharmentke; West Germany	Charles Peart; Canada
800 m 4	Rick Hansen; Canada	B. Parks; United States	Uriel Martinez; Mexico
800 m 5	Mel Fitzgerald; Canada	Erich Hubel; Australia	E. H. Roek; Netherlands
800 m CP C	Bertil Shawn; Sweden	Tony Harborn; Sweden	Mario Panico; Italy
800 m CP D	Jonas Andersson; Sweden	Henrik Thomsen; Denmark	Duvivier; France
1500 m 4	B. Parks; United States	Rick Hansen; Canada	Remi van Ophem; Belgium
1500 m 5	Mel Fitzgerald; Canada	E. H. Roek; Netherlands	Erich Hubel; Australia
1500 m A	Jacques Pilon; Canada	Joerund Gaasemyr; Norway	Hans Anton Aalien; Norway
1500 m B	Paul English; Canada	Leamon Stansell; United States	Bruce Sandilands; Australia
1500 m E	R. Lindberg; Finland	Chris Facey; Canada	Jan Krauz; Poland
1500 m E1	Cato Zahl Pedersen; Norway	Yekutiel Gershoni; Israel	Jorn Nielsen; Denmark
1500 m F	Karl Schroeder; West Germany	J. Alexandre; France	J. Santos; Spain
1500 m F1	Khater Eid Ghreeb; Egypt	None	None
5000 m walk A	S. Kobayashi; Japan	R. Luotonen; Finland	Miroslav Jancic; Yugoslavia
5000 m walk B	Derek Howie; Great Britain	Gerald O'Neil; United States	Eddie Morten; Canada
4×60 m relay 1A-1C	Mexico (MEX); Arturo Granados; Eduardo Monsalvo; Pedro Sandoval; Francisco de las Fuentes	United States (USA); J. Lewellyn; G. Slupe; J. Thorn; D. Wallen	Netherlands (NED); E. Niehof; C. J. M. Slijkerman; J. C. Smit; J. van der Belt
4×80 m relay CP D	United States (USA)	Belgium (BEL)	Denmark (DEN)
4×100 m relay 2-5	Belgium (BEL); M. de Meyer; Marc de Vos; Remi van Ophem; Paul van Winkel	Mexico (MEX); Rene Corona; Uriel Martinez; Ruben Rojas; Eusebio Valdez	Canada (CAN); Mel Fitzgerald; Rick Hansen; Ron Minor; André Viger
4×100 m relay C	West Germany (FRG)	None	None
4×100 m relay D	West Germany (FRG)	None	None
4×100 m relay D1	United States (USA); Curt Brinkman; Richard Bryant; J. Finch; Jim Martinson	None	None
4×100 m relay E-F1	West Germany (FRG)	None	None
4×400 m relay D1	United States (USA)	None	None
4×400 m relay E	West Germany (FRG)	None	None
High jump A	Eric Lambier; Canada	Robert Wright; United States	John Bowman; United States
High jump B	Hiromasa Matsui; Japan	August Hofer; Austria	W. Knorrs; West Germany
High jump C	Jurgen Johann; West Germany	D. J. Eden; New Zealand	
High jump C	Jurgen Johann; West Germany	Tony Wills; Canada	
High jump D	Arnold Boldt; Canada	Anthony Willis; Great Britain	Norbert Kolodzie; West Germany
High jump E	Jan Krauz; Poland	Walter Kessler; Switzerland	Andres Garcia; Spain
High jump F	Gerhard Kolm; Austria	S. Ishii; Japan	Nitzan Atzmon; Israel
Long jump A	Jarle Johnsen; Norway	Markku Onnela; Finland	Yvan Bourdeau; Canada
Long jump B	Andrzej Pawlik; Poland	Masafumi Muramatsu; Japan	W. Knorrs; West Germany
Long jump C	George Jorg; Austria	Jurgen Johann; West Germany	Zvi Hoffman; Israel
Long jump CP C	Alex Hermans; Belgium	Salvin Ficaro; United States	Rick Ros; United States
Long jump CP D	B. Pierre; France	Jonas Andersson; Sweden	Mario de Baene; Belgium
Long jump D	Arnold Boldt; Canada	Bert Bottemanne; Netherlands	Norbert Kolodzie; West Germany
Long jump E	Jan Krauz; Poland	Andres Garcia; Spain	Jerzy Dabrowski; Poland
Long jump E1	Cato Zahl Pedersen; Norway	Jorn Nielsen; Denmark	Yekutiel Gershoni; Israel
Long jump F	Marian Wierzbicki; Poland	S. Ishii; Japan	Shing Chi Ko; Hong Kong
Long jump F1	Matthias Berg; West Germany	Charles Peart; Canada	R. Scharmentke; West Germany
Triple jump A	Soedjeman Dipowidjojo; Netherlands	Ryszard Kozuch; Poland	Markku Onnela; Finland
Triple jump B	Andrzej Pawlik; Poland	N. Alvarez; Spain	Kalle Hautalahti; Finland
Club throw 1A	Wayne Patchett; Australia	Francisco de las Fuentes; Mexico	Patrick McCool; Ireland
Club throw 1B	Julius Duval; United States	John Sands; Bahamas	Dennis Cherenko; Canada
Discus throw 1A	Wayne Patchett; Australia	Edund Weber; West Germany	Patrick McCool; Ireland
Discus throw 1B	Julius Duval; United States	M. Heinonmaki; Finland	John Sands; Bahamas
Discus throw 1C	Pedro Sandoval; Mexico	David Hynds; New Zealand	Jozef Jagiela; Poland
Discus throw 2	Graham Condon; New Zealand	Joze Okoren; Yugoslavia	Robert Tusa; United States
Discus throw 3	Remi van Ophem; Belgium	Japheth Musyoki; Kenya	Eric Russell; Australia
Discus throw 4	Eugene Reimer; Canada	Luis Grieb; Argentina	Steve Gregg; Great Britain
Discus throw 5	Raymond Clark; Sweden	Jerzy Skrzypek; Poland	Rene Ahrens; Australia
Discus throw A	Pekka Kujala; Finland	Dieter Grundmann; West Germany	Ryszard Zyskowski; Poland
Discus throw B	Andrzej Godlewski; Poland	Gosta Karlsson; Sweden	Teuno Talmia; Finland
Discus throw C	Hans Josefiak; West Germany	Al Heaver; Canada	Zvi Hoffman; Israel
Discus throw C1	Mieczyslaw Maminski; Poland	Pekka Ihalainen; Finland	Henryk Piatkowski; Poland
Discus throw CP C	M. de Vlieghere; Belgium	Yehu Adani; Israel	Rick Ross; United States
Discus throw CP D	Bjorn Tangen; Norway	Tom Becke; United States	Jack Kelly; United States
Discus throw D	Andrzej Poplawski; Poland	Andrzej Zmitrowicz; Poland	Issahar Navon; Israel
Discus throw D1	John Jerome; United States	Richard Bryant; United States	Walter Zierl; Austria
Discus throw E	Alois Beez; West Germany	Jerzy Dabrowski; Poland	Atte Karkkainen; Finland
Discus throw F	Achiel Braet; Belgium	Dan Leonard; Canada	H. Alberts; Netherlands
Discus throw J	Stanislaw Paluch; Poland	Philip Sadler; Great Britain	Dale Vincent; Canada
Javelin throw 1C	Guenter Spiess; West Germany	Siegmar Henker; West Germany	Jozef Jagiela; Poland
Javelin throw 2	J. Levestone; Netherlands	Robert Tusa; United States	J. F. G. Weyers; Netherlands
Javelin throw 3	Davis Jeffreson; Jamaica	Reno Levis; United States	Marc de Vos; Belgium
Javelin throw 4	E. Benz; West Germany	Johann Schuhbauer; West Germany	Marjan Peternelj; Yugoslavia
Javelin throw 5	Raymond Clark; Sweden	Jerzy Skrzypek; Poland	P. Morel; France
Javelin throw B	Timo Sulisalo; Finland	Gilles Marois; Canada	Andrzej Godlewski; Poland
Javelin throw C	Gilbert Pflanzer; Austria	Al Heaver; Canada	E. Kuehnel; West Germany
Javelin throw C1	Denis Lapalme; Canada	Henryk Piatkowski; Poland	Mieczyslaw Naminski; Poland
Javelin throw CP C	M. de Vlieghere; Belgium	Yehu Adani; Israel	T. A. van der Marel; Netherlands
Javelin throw CP D	Bjorn Tangen; Norway	Charles Mowery; United States	Andreas Boettinger; Switzerland
Javelin throw D	Andrzej Zmitrowicz; Poland	Leon Sur; France	Bert Bottemanne; Netherlands
Javelin throw D1	John Jerome; United States	Walter Zierl; Austria	Norman Burke; Jamaica
Javelin throw E	Jerzy Dabrowski; Poland	Alois Beez; West Germany	Reino Jaaskelainen; Finland
Javelin throw F	Dan Leonard; Canada	Achiel Braet; Belgium	H. Alberts; Netherlands
Javelin throw J	Philip Sadler; Great Britain	Metwali Ahmed Khadr; Egypt	Stanislaw Paluch; Poland
Shot put 1A	Wayne Patchett; Australia	Edund Weber; West Germany	S. Wilkins; United States
Shot put 1B	Mohamad Bashir Eltigani; Sudan	Julius Duval; United States	John Donahue; Canada
Shot put 1C	Guenter Spiess; West Germany	Siegmar Henker; West Germany	David Hynds; New Zealand
Shot put 2	Murray Todd; Australia	Walter Hertle; West Germany	Clause Stevens; Ireland
Shot put 3	Eric Russell; Australia	Japheth Musyoki; Kenya	Marc de Vos; Belgium
Shot put 4	Doug Lyons; Canada	Steve Gregg; Great Britain	Johann Schuhbauer; West Germany
Shot put 5	Raymond Clark; Sweden	Jerzy Skrzypek; Poland	Jacek Kowalik; Poland
Shot put A	James Neppl; United States	Pekka Kujala; Finland	Dieter Grundmann; West Germany
Shot put B	Gosta Karlsson; Sweden	James Mastro; United States	Andrzej Godlewski; Poland
Shot put C	Hans Josefiak; West Germany	Zvi Karsh; Israel	E. Kuehnel; West Germany
Shot put C1	Mieczyslaw Maminski; Poland	Pekka Ihalainen; Finland	Henryk Piatkowski; Poland
Shot put CP C	Alex Hermans; Belgium	M. de Vlieghere; Belgium	Willy Mermod; Switzerland
Shot put CP D	Tom Becke; United States	Bjorn Tangen; Norway	Franjo Izlakar; Yugoslavia
Shot put D	Andrzej Poplawski; Poland	Andrzej Zmitrowicz; Poland	G. Dorst; West Germany
Shot put D1	John Jerome; United States	Richard Bryant; United States	Norman Burke; Jamaica
Shot put E	Alois Beez; West Germany	Jerzy Dabrowski; Poland	Atte Karkkainen; Finland
Shot put F	Achiel Braet; Belgium	Dan Leonard; Canada	Juergen Kern; West Germany
Shot put J	Stanislaw Paluch; Poland	Philip Sadler; Great Britain	Dale Vincent; Canada
Slalom 1A	Meinrad Cavigelli; Switzerland	Francisco de las Fuentes; Mexico	Ed Batt; Canada
Slalom 1B	Giovanni Ciuffreda; Italy	C. J. M. Slijkerman; Netherlands	J. van der Belt; Netherlands
Slalom 1C	D. Miller; New Zealand	Juan Cornejo; Mexico	Kazuo Yamaguchi; Japan
Slalom 2	Yoshio Tsunoda; Japan	Graham Condon; New Zealand	Jensen Frits Steilborg; Denmark
Slalom 3	Paul van Winkel; Belgium	Gregor Golombek; West Germany	Fred Pointer; Australia
Slalom 4	Tadanobu Go; Japan	Masahiro Hara; Japan	Ron Minor; Canada
Slalom 5	Franz Nietlispach; Switzerland	Fumio Ogawa; Japan	Robert McIntyre; Australia
Slalom F1	Andreas Brand; West Germany	Matthias Berg; West Germany	Khater Eid Ghreeb; Egypt
Pentathlon 1A	U. Ikonen; Finland	Matti Launonen; Finland	None
Pentathlon 1B	G. Frank; Austria	Ian Trewhella; Australia	Goran Eriksson; Sweden
Pentathlon 1C	Siegmar Henker; West Germany	Felix Lettner; Austria	Patrick Reid; Jamaica
Pentathlon 2	Walter Hertle; West Germany	J. F. G. Weyers; Netherlands	Giuseppe Trieste; Italy
Pentathlon 3	Reno Levis; United States	Wolfgang Stieg; Austria	Eric Russell; Australia
Pentathlon 4	Johann Schuhbauer; West Germany	L. Zeise; United States	W. Flach; West Germany
Pentathlon 5	Raymond Clark; Sweden	M. de Meyer; Belgium	P. Ost; West Germany
Pentathlon A	Ryszard Zyskowski; Poland	Reuven Perach; Israel	David Jakubovich; Israel
Pentathlon B	Andrzej Pawlik; Poland	Pawel Janowicz; Poland	Danny de Sutter; Belgium
Pentathlon C	Al Heaver; Canada	George Jorg; Austria	Zvi Hoffman; Israel
Pentathlon C1	Karl Prichtzig; Austria	Lasse Eva; Finland	None
Pentathlon D	Anthony Willis; Great Britain	Gerhard Grinninger; Austria	Issahar Navon; Israel
Pentathlon D1	Richard Bryant; United States	Walter Zierl; Austria	None
Pentathlon E	Chris Facey; Canada	Reino Jaaskelainen; Finland	Wolfgang Pickl; Austria
Pentathlon E1	Jorn Nielsen; Denmark	None	None
Pentathlon F	Dan Leonard; Canada	Sepp Gasser; Austria	Heikki Miettinen; Finland

=== Women's events ===
Event	Gold	Silver	Bronze
60 m 1A	Josefina Cornejo; Mexico	Karen Donaldson; United States	Maggie McLellan; Great Britain
60 m 1B	C. Patton; United States	Martha Sandoval; Mexico	Rosaleen Gallagher; Ireland
60 m 1C	Ahmed Fathi Hanan; Egypt	Gabriella Boreggio; Italy	Sharon Myers; United States
60 m 2	Adelah Al-Roumi; Kuwait	Dora Garcia; Mexico	Glee Lyford; United States
60 m 3	Angeles Valdez; Mexico	Barbara Howie; Great Britain	Anna Rita Serrone; Italy
60 m 4	Sharon Rahn; United States	C. Petitot; France	Kathryne Lynne Carlton; United States
60 m 5	Juana Soto; Mexico	Sue Hobbs; Australia	Kerstin Wiksen; Sweden
60 m A	Carmella Lovitt; United States	Lou Keller; United States	Melissa Ricketts; United States
60 m CP C	Onfroy; France	Margo Maddox; United States	Linda Feeny; United States
60 m CP D	D. Dosimont; France	Zita Karlen; Switzerland	Royet; France
100 m B	Grazyna Kozlowska; Poland	June Smith; United States	G. Madrid; Spain
100 m C	Anne Farrell; Canada	Karen Gillis; Canada	Charmaine Cree; Australia
100 m C1	Danuta Kozlak; Poland	None	None
100 m D	Melody Williamson; United States	R. Kirby; United States	None
100 m D1	Sarah Newland; Jamaica	Barbara Bedla; Poland	Alina Wieczorek; Poland
100 m E	Barbara Joscelyne; Great Britain	R. Rantala; Finland	Zofia Mielech; Poland
100 m F	Hiromi Nobumoto; Japan	Krystyna Cwiklinska; Poland	None
100 m F1	Giselle Cole; Canada	Lina Franzese; Italy	None
200 m 2	Adelah Al-Roumi; Kuwait	Patricia Hill; New Zealand	Glee Lyford; United States
200 m 3	Candace Cable; United States	Angeles Valdez; Mexico	Karen Casper; United States
400 m 2	Glee Lyford; United States	Elisabeth Bisquolm; Switzerland	Patricia Hill; New Zealand
400 m 3	Candace Cable; United States	Angeles Valdez; Mexico	Pam Frazee; Canada
400 m A	Lou Keller; United States	Purificacion Santamarta; Spain	Eva Johansson; Sweden
400 m B	I. Schafhausen; West Germany	Brenda Wells; United States	Donna Webb; United States
400 m C1	Danuta Kozlak; Poland	None	None
400 m CP C	Onfroy; France	Veronique Rochette; France	Linda Feeny; United States
400 m CP D	D. Dosimont; France	Royet; France	Joanne Guardiola; United States
400 m D	R. Kirby; United States	None	None
400 m D1 runners	Alina Wieczorek; Poland	None	None
400 m D1 wheelchairs	Barbara Bedla; Poland	None	None
400 m E	Barbara Joscelyne; Great Britain	R. Rantala; Finland	None
400 m F1	Giselle Cole; Canada	U. Sievert; West Germany	Petra Schad; West Germany
800 m 4	Sharon Rahn; United States	Kathryne Lynne Carlton; United States	Ana María Tenorio; Mexico
800 m 5	Juana Soto; Mexico	Sue Hobbs; Australia	C. Curtiss; United States
800 m A	Susanne Wittje; West Germany	Doris Campell; Austria	K. Pennanen; Finland
800 m B	I. Schafhausen; West Germany	Brenda Wells; United States	Lily Wong; Canada
1500 m 4	Sharon Rahn; United States	Kathryne Lynne Carlton; United States	C. Zeyher; West Germany
1500 m 5	Juana Soto; Mexico	Sue Hobbs; Australia	C. Curtiss; United States
1500 m F1	Petra Schad; West Germany	Lina Franzese; Italy	None
3000 m walk A	Cheryl Hurd; Canada	Marie Coosemans; Belgium	Y. Omshiro; Japan
4×60 m relay 1A-1C	United States (USA)	None	None
4×60 m relay 2-5	Mexico (MEX); Rosa Camara; Dora Garcia; Juana Soto; Angeles Valdez	United States (USA); Candace Cable; Kathryne Lynne Carlton; Karen Casper; Sharon Rahn	West Germany (FRG); Waltraud Hagenlocher; Errol Marklein; S. Roelli; C. Zeyher
4×60 m relay CP C	United States (USA)	None	None
4×60 m relay CP D	None	None	None
High jump A	Joke van Rijswijk; Netherlands	Ilse Bohning; West Germany	Cheryl Hurd; Canada
High jump B	Janet Rowley; United States	Lynelle Brantner; United States	Anna Ostapa; Canada
High jump C	Charmaine Cree; Australia	None	None
High jump D	Sue Grimstead; Canada	None	None
Long jump B	I. Schafhausen; West Germany	Donna Webb; United States	Bozena Kwiatkowska; Poland
Long jump C	Anne Farrell; Canada	Charmaine Cree; Australia	Karen Gillis; Canada
Long jump CP C	Onfroy; France	Veronique Rochette; France	Margo Maddox; United States
Long jump CP D	D. Dosimont; France	Royet; France	Melissa Noe; United States
Long jump D	Sue Grimstead; Canada	T. G. Niehoff-Engelbertink; Netherlands	None
Long jump E	Barbara Joscelyne; Great Britain	Zofia Mielech; Poland	R. Rantala; Finland
Long jump F	Hiromi Nobumoto; Japan	Krystyna Cwiklinska; Poland	None
Long jump F1	Giselle Cole; Canada	U. Sievert; West Germany	Petra Schad; West Germany
Club throw 1A	Josefina Cornejo; Mexico	Sandra James; Zimbabwe	Eugenia Garcia; Argentina
Club throw 1B	Minette Wilson; Jamaica	Martha Sandoval; Mexico	Rosaleen Gallagher; Ireland
Discus throw 1A	Josefina Cornejo; Mexico	Sandra James; Zimbabwe	Eugenia Garcia; Argentina
Discus throw 1B	Martha Sandoval; Mexico	Ruth Rosenbaum; United States	Rosaleen Gallagher; Ireland
Discus throw 1C	Sharon Myers; United States	Ahmed Fathi Hanan; Egypt	Gabriella Boreggio; Italy
Discus throw 2	Kari Nilsen; Norway	M. Price; Great Britain	Krystyna Owczarczyk; Poland
Discus throw 3	Zdzisława Zawadija; Poland	Quida White; Jamaica	Cathy Dunne; Ireland
Discus throw 4	Kathryne Lynne Carlton; United States	Lilia Harasimczuk; Poland	Barbara Magda; Poland
Discus throw 5	Leone Williams; Jamaica	C. Swanepoel; West Germany	Eva Burgunder; Switzerland
Discus throw A	Melissa Ricketts; United States	M. A. T. Polderman-Kortekaas; Netherlands	T. G. Skipwith; New Zealand
Discus throw B	Janet Rowley; United States	Barbara Wardak; Poland	G. Fieber; West Germany
Discus throw C	Anne Farrell; Canada	Liisa Makela; Finland	Charmaine Cree; Australia
Discus throw C1	Sarah Baker; Canada	Danuta Kozlak; Poland	Elisabeth Osterwalder; Switzerland
Discus throw CP C	M. Goddard; Great Britain	Arlette Piller; Switzerland	Debbie Bush; United States
Discus throw CP D	Ann Marie Roberts; United States	Chris Fuller; United States	Zita Karlen; Switzerland
Discus throw D	Stephania Balta; Canada	T. G. Niehoff-Engelbertink; Netherlands	Marianne Ruml; Austria
Discus throw D1	Barbara Bedla; Poland	Gaber Ali Nagat; Egypt	Alina Wieczorek; Poland
Discus throw E	Zofia Mielech; Poland	None	None
Discus throw F	Krystyna Cwiklinska; Poland	Hiromi Nobumoto; Japan	None
Javelin throw 1C	Sharon Myers; United States	Ahmed Fathi Hanan; Egypt	None
Javelin throw 2	Kari Nilsen; Norway	Krystyna Owczarczyk; Poland	M. Price; Great Britain
Javelin throw 3	Lucy Wanjiru; Kenya	Mary Dube; Zimbabwe	Halina Sobolewska; Poland
Javelin throw 4	Lissi Kogi; Denmark	Henriette Davis; Jamaica	Milka Milinkovic; Yugoslavia
Javelin throw 5	Zipora Rubin; Israel	Leone Williams; Jamaica	P. Vermeulen; Belgium
Javelin throw A	Melissa Ricketts; United States	M. A. T. Polderman-Kortekaas; Netherlands	Brigitte Otto-Lange; West Germany
Javelin throw B	Dorota Blok; Poland	Barbara Wardak; Poland	Lily Wong; Canada
Javelin throw C	Anne Farrell; Canada	Liisa Makela; Finland	Charmaine Cree; Australia
Javelin throw C1	Sarah Baker; Canada	Elisabeth Osterwalder; Switzerland	Danuta Kozlak; Poland
Javelin throw CP C	M. Goddard; Great Britain	Bev Herzog; United States	Arlette Piller; Switzerland
Javelin throw CP D	Amanda Kyffin; Great Britain	Mary Vaughn; United States	Rosemarie Tirrelli; United States
Javelin throw D	Stephania Balta; Canada	Melody Williamson; United States	T. G. Niehoff-Engelbertink; Netherlands
Javelin throw D1	Gaber Ali Nagat; Egypt	P. Martin; United States	Barbara Bedla; Poland
Javelin throw E	Zofia Mielech; Poland	None	None
Javelin throw F	Hiromi Nobumoto; Japan	Krystyna Cwiklinska; Poland	None
Shot put 1A	Josefina Cornejo; Mexico	Sandra James; Zimbabwe	Eugenia Garcia; Argentina
Shot put 1B	C. Patton; United States	Martha Sandoval; Mexico	Minette Wilson; Jamaica
Shot put 1C	Ahmed Fathi Hanan; Egypt	Sharon Myers; United States	None
Shot put 2	M. Price; Great Britain	Adelah Al-Roumi; Kuwait	Krystyna Owczarczyk; Poland
Shot put 3	Eve M. Rimmer; New Zealand	Waltraud Hagenlocher; West Germany	Halina Sobolewska; Poland
Shot put 4	Henriette Davis; Jamaica	Lissi Kogi; Denmark	Milka Milinkovic; Yugoslavia
Shot put 5	Leone Williams; Jamaica	C. Swanepoel; West Germany	Zipora Rubin; Israel
Shot put A	M. A. T. Polderman-Kortekaas; Netherlands	Ilse Bohning; West Germany	Brigitte Otto-Lange; West Germany
Shot put A	M. A. T. Polderman-Kortekaas; Netherlands	Ilse Bohning; West Germany	Melissa Ricketts; United States
Shot put B	Janet Rowley; United States	G. Fieber; West Germany	Barbara Wardak; Poland
Shot put C	Anne Farrell; Canada	Liisa Makela; Finland	None
Shot put C1	Elisabeth Osterwalder; Switzerland	Danuta Kozlak; Poland	None
Shot put CP C	M. Goddard; Great Britain	Bev Herzog; United States	None
Shot put CP D	D. Dosimont; France	Zita Karlen; Switzerland	Amanda Kyffin; Great Britain
Shot put D	Stephania Balta; Canada	Edeltraud Russo; Switzerland	T. G. Niehoff-Engelbertink; Netherlands
Shot put D1	Barbara Bedla; Poland	Alina Wieczorek; Poland	Gaber Ali Nagat; Egypt
Shot put E	Zofia Mielech; Poland	None	None
Shot put F	Krystyna Cwiklinska; Poland	Hiromi Nobumoto; Japan	None
Slalom 1A	Karen Donaldson; United States	Josefina Cornejo; Mexico	J. Toomey; Ireland
Slalom 1B	C. Patton; United States	Ruth Rosenbaum; United States	Rosa Sicari; Italy
Slalom 1C	Gabriella Boreggio; Italy	Sharon Myers; United States	None
Slalom 2	Patricia Hill; New Zealand	Ingrid Lauridsen; Denmark	Margit Quell; West Germany
Slalom 3	Darleen Quinlan; United States	Nella McPherson; Jamaica	Annie Cornil; Belgium
Slalom 4	B. Eckert; West Germany	C. Zeyher; West Germany	Chiyoko Ohmae; Japan
Slalom 5	Joanne McDonald; Canada	Rita Breuer; West Germany	Rosa Zaugg; Switzerland
Pentathlon 1B	Rosaleen Gallagher; Ireland	Ruth Rosenbaum; United States	None
Pentathlon 2	Margit Quell; West Germany	Krystyna Owczarczyk; Poland	None
Pentathlon 3	Waltraud Hagenlocher; West Germany	Julie Russell; Australia	Cathy Dunne; Ireland
Pentathlon 4	Lilia Harasimczuk; Poland	S. Battran; West Germany	Ana María Tenorio; Mexico
Pentathlon 5	Kerstin Wiksen; Sweden	S. Roelli; West Germany	None
Pentathlon A	Ilse Bohning; West Germany	Lou Keller; United States	Donna Brown; United States
Pentathlon B	K. M. Firth; New Zealand	Lucille Baillargeon; Canada	Lynelle Brantner; United States
Pentathlon D	Stephania Balta; Canada	Marianne Ruml; Austria	None
