= FITA round open medalists =

FITA round opens are defunct Paralympic archery events that were featured between 1960 and 1988. The classes changed between 1976 and 1980 as the number of countries competing increased, the FITA rounds were abolished in 1992 as the classes changed again.

== Medalists ==
=== Men's events ===
==== Men's FITA round open ====
Event	Gold	Silver	Bronze
1960 Rome	Jack Whitman; United States	Bradley; Great Britain	Potter; Great Britain
1964 Tokyo	Dean Slaugh; United States	Peter Blanker; Netherlands	Eric Johansson; Sweden
1968 Tel Aviv	Popke Popkema; Netherlands	Tony South; Australia	Elbracht; West Germany
1972 Heidelberg	E. Hammel; West Germany	Tony Fowler; Australia	Popke Popkema; Netherlands
1976 Toronto	Guy Grun; Belgium	H. Weiss; West Germany	W. Kokott; South Africa
1988 Seoul	Tae Sung An; South Korea	Carmelo Scalisi; Belgium	Antonio Rebollo; Spain

==== Men's FITA round team open ====
Event	Gold	Silver	Bronze
1964 Tokyo	United States (USA)	Japan (JPN)	None
1968 Tel Aviv	West Germany (FRG)	Great Britain (GBR)	United States (USA)
1972 Heidelberg	West Germany (FRG)	Netherlands (NED)	Australia (AUS)
1976 Toronto	United States (USA)	Belgium (BEL)	Netherlands (NED)
1984 New York/Stoke Mandeville	Belgium (BEL)	Netherlands (NED)	Great Britain (GBR)
1988 Seoul	South Korea (KOR)	Finland (FIN)	France (FRA)

==== Men's FITA round tetraplegic A-C ====
Event	Gold	Silver	Bronze
1976 Toronto	Hans Pimmelar; Netherlands	Oddbjorn Stebekk; Norway	N. James; Great Britain
1980 Arnhem	T. Parker; Canada	Oddbjorn Stebekk; Norway	G. Lafont; France
1984 New York/Stoke Mandeville	Felix Lettner; Austria	K. Koneman; Netherlands	Oddbjorn Stebekk; Norway

==== Men's double FITA round amputee ====
Event	Gold	Silver	Bronze
1980 Arnhem	Finn Larsen; Denmark	Manfred Brenne; West Germany	Masao Sato; Japan

==== Men's double FITA round integrated ====
Event	Gold	Silver	Bronze
1984 New York/Stoke Mandeville	Jan Thulin; Sweden	Antonion Rebollo; Spain	Raimo Tirronen; Finland

==== Men's double FITA round novice (paraplegic) ====
Event	Gold	Silver	Bronze
1980 Arnhem	Alfredo Chavez; Mexico	Jappie Walstra; Netherlands	H. van der Liefvoort; Netherlands

==== Men's double FITA round novice tetraplegic ====
Event	Gold	Silver	Bronze
1980 Arnhem	K. Karkainen; Finland	Tadashi Kishino; Japan	Kent Andersson-Tannerstad; Sweden

==== Men's double FITA round paraplegic ====
Event	Gold	Silver	Bronze
1980 Arnhem	H. Geiss; West Germany	Guy Grun; Belgium	John Buchanan; Great Britain
1984 New York/Stoke Mandeville	Guy Grun; Belgium	J. Weijers; Netherlands	Heikki Laukkanen; Finland
1988 Seoul	Michel Baudois; Switzerland	Hee Sook Him; South Korea	Udo Wolf; West Germany

==== Men's double FITA round team amputee ====
Event	Gold	Silver	Bronze
1980 Arnhem	West Germany (FRG)	Sweden (SWE)	None

==== Men's double FITA round team paraplegic ====
Event	Gold	Silver	Bronze
1980 Arnhem	Belgium (BEL)	Great Britain (GBR)	West Germany (FRG)

==== Men's double FITA round team integrated ====
Event	Gold	Silver	Bronze
1984 New York/Stoke Mandeville	Sweden (SWE)	France (FRA)	West Germany (FRG)

==== Men's double FITA round Class 1-2 ====
Event	Gold	Silver	Bronze
1984 New York/Stoke Mandeville	David Barefoot; Canada	None	None

==== Men's double FITA round Class 3-6 ====
Event	Gold	Silver	Bronze
1984 New York/Stoke Mandeville	Philip Thorne; Great Britain	None	None

==== Men's double FITA round division 3 ====
Event	Gold	Silver	Bronze
1984 New York/Stoke Mandeville	Kjell Løvvold; Norway	Alfons Kuys; Belgium	Benoit Tanquerel; France
1988 Seoul	Alfons Kuys; Belgium	Kiyotaka Tashiro; Japan	Kyung Sun Kim; South Korea

=== Women's events ===
==== Women's FITA round open ====
Event	Gold	Silver	Bronze
1960 Rome	Margaret Harriman; Rhodesia	Comley; Great Britain	R. Irvine; Great Britain
1964 Tokyo	Margaret Harriman; Rhodesia	N. Thesen; South Africa	R. Irvine; Great Britain
1968 Tel Aviv	Margaret Harriman; Rhodesia	Rodaster; Sweden	Webb; United States
1972 Heidelberg	Margaret Harriman; South Africa	Gibbs; Great Britain	Mireille Maraschin; France
1976 Toronto	Bodil Elgh; Sweden	Anneliese Dersen; West Germany	Rhonda July; United States

==== Women's double FITA round amputee ====
Event	Gold	Silver	Bronze
1980 Arnhem	Marie Rosvik; Norway	Ewa Kwuecinska; Poland	Marie-Francoise Hybois; France

==== Women's double FITA round paraplegic ====
Event	Gold	Silver	Bronze
1980 Arnhem	Neroli Fairhall; New Zealand	Elli Korva; Finland	Anneliese Dersen; West Germany
1984 New York/Stoke Mandeville	Susan Hagel; United States	Hifumi Suzuki; Japan	S. Davie; Australia
1988 Seoul	Karen Watts; Great Britain	Elli Korva; Finland	Paola Fantato; Italy

==== Women's double FITA round novice paraplegic ====
Event	Gold	Silver	Bronze
1980 Arnhem	Chiyoko Ohmae; Japan	None	None

==== Women's double FITA round division 3 ====
Event	Gold	Silver	Bronze
1984 New York/Stoke Mandeville	Helen Hilderley; Great Britain	Beverley Leaper; Great Britain	None

==== Women's FITA round integrated ====
Event	Gold	Silver	Bronze
1984 New York/Stoke Mandeville	Anneliese Dersen; West Germany	Martine Lacomblez; Belgium	Irene Monaco; Italy
1988 Seoul	Kyung Hee Lee; South Korea	Anneliese Dersen; West Germany	Birthe Morgensen; Denmark

==== Women's FITA round team open ====
Event	Gold	Silver	Bronze
1976 Toronto	United States (USA)	None	None
1988 Seoul	Great Britain (GBR)	West Germany (FRG)	Finland (FIN)
