= Archery at the 1980 Summer Paralympics =

Archery at the VI Paralympic Games
- Paralympic Archery
- Competitors: 111 from 23 nations

Archery at the 1980 Summer Paralympics consisted of fifteen events, ten for men and five for women.

== Medal table ==
Rank	Nation	Gold	Silver	Bronze	Total
1	West Germany (FRG)	3	1	2	6
2	Austria (AUT)	1	1	1	3
2	Japan (JPN)	1	1	1	3
2	Norway (NOR)	1	1	1	3
5	Belgium (BEL)	1	1	0	2
5	Finland (FIN)	1	1	0	2
5	New Zealand (NZL)	1	1	0	2
5	United States (USA)	1	1	0	2
9	France (FRA)	1	0	3	4
10	Canada (CAN)	1	0	0	1
10	Denmark (DEN)	1	0	0	1
10	Mexico (MEX)	1	0	0	1
10	South Korea (KOR)	1	0	0	1
14	Great Britain (GBR)	0	2	2	4
15	Netherlands (NED)	0	1	1	2
15	Sweden (SWE)	0	1	1	2
17	Australia (AUS)	0	1	0	1
17	Poland (POL)	0	1	0	1
Totals (18 entries)		15	14	12	41

=== Participating nations ===
- Australia (4)
- Austria (5)
- Belgium (7)
- Canada (3)
- Denmark (2)
- Finland (7)
- France (9)
- Great Britain (7)
- Italy (2)
- Japan (5)
- Luxembourg (1)
- Mexico (1)
- Netherlands (9)
- New Zealand (5)
- Norway (9)
- Poland (2)
- South Korea (2)
- Spain (1)
- Sweden (6)
- Switzerland (3)
- United States (7)
- West Germany (13)
- Zimbabwe (1)

== Medal summary ==
=== Men's events ===
Event	Gold	Silver	Bronze
Advanced metric round paraplegic	Yoon Bae Kim; South Korea	M. Petschnig; Austria	Felix Lettner; Austria
Double FITA round amputee	Finn Larsen; Denmark	Manfred Brenne; West Germany	Masao Sato; Japan
Double FITA round novice paraplegic	Alfredo Chavez; Mexico	Jappie Walstra; Netherlands	H. van der Liefvoort; Netherlands
Double FITA round novice tetraplegic	K. Karkainen; Finland	Tadashi Kishino; Japan	Kent Andersson-Tannerstad; Sweden
Double FITA round paraplegic	H. Geiss; West Germany	Guy Grun; Belgium	John Buchanan; Great Britain
Double FITA round team amputee	West Germany (FRG); Manfred Brenne; Hilmar Butenhoff; K. Pohl	Sweden (SWE); Sune Appelkvist; Nicolai Babkin; Jan O. Carsson	
Double FITA round team paraplegic	Belgium (BEL); Filip Bardoel; Guy Grun; Jozef Meysen	Great Britain (GBR); John Buchanan; Alan Corrie; Ian Smith	West Germany (FRG); H. Geiss; U. Pfeffer; R. Schmidberger
Double FITA round tetraplegic	T. Parker; Canada	Oddbjorn Stebekk; Norway	G. Lafont; France
Short metric round paraplegic	J. M. Chapuis; France	L. Zeise; United States	J. Thion; France
Short metric round tetraplegic	Siegmar Henker; West Germany	Ian Trewhella; Australia	Svein Kristiansen; Norway

=== Women's events ===
Event	Gold	Silver	Bronze
Advanced metric round paraplegic	K. Unsicker; United States	Eve M. Rimmer; New Zealand	G. Matthews; Great Britain
Double FITA round amputee	Marie Rosvik; Norway	Ewa Kwiecinska; Poland	Marie-Francoise Hybois; France
Double FITA round novice paraplegic	Chiyoko Ohmae; Japan		
Double FITA round paraplegic	Neroli Fairhall; New Zealand	Elli Korva; Finland	Anneliese Dersen; West Germany
Short metric round paraplegic	Rosa Schweizer; Austria	Valerie Williamson; Great Britain	
