= South Korea at the 1980 Summer Paralympics =

- IPC code: KOR
- NPC: Korean Paralympic Committee
- Website: www.kosad.or.kr (in Korean)

in Arnhem
- Medals Ranked 26th: Gold 2 Silver 2 Bronze 1 Total 5

Summer Paralympics appearances (overview)
- 1968; 1972; 1976; 1980; 1984; 1988; 1992; 1996; 2000; 2004; 2008; 2012; 2016; 2020; 2024

South Korea competed at the 1980 Summer Paralympics in Arnhem, Netherlands.

== Medalists ==
Medal	Name	Sport	Event
Gold	Kim Yoon-Bae	Archery	Men's advanced metric round paraplegic
Gold	Choi Dong-Sik	Table tennis	Men's singles 3
Silver	Choi Tae-Am	Table tennis	Men's singles 2
Silver	Uh Jong-Hoe; Kim Si-Un	Table tennis	Men's teams 1C
Bronze	Kim So-Boo; Choi Dong-Sik	Table tennis	Men's teams 4

== Archery ==
Athlete	Event	Final	
Athlete	Event	Points	Rank
Kim Yoon-Bae	Men's Advanced metric round paraplegic	884	1st place, gold medalist(s)
Chang Ki-Ki	Men's Double FITA round paraplegic	2164	14

== Dartchery ==
Athlete	Event	Round of 16	Quarterfinals	Semifinals	Final	
Athlete	Event	Opposition Score	Opposition Score	Opposition Score	Opposition Score	Rank
South Korea	Men's Pairs open	Great Britain (GBR); Won	Finland (FIN); Won	Norway (NOR); Lose	United States (USA); Lose	4

== Table tennis ==
Athlete	Event	Round of 32	Round of 16	Quarterfinals	Semifinals	Final
Athlete	Event	Opposition Result	Opposition Result	Opposition Result	Opposition Result	Opposition Result
Kim Si-Un	Men's Singles 1C	bye	E. Broos (NED); W 2–0	Daniel Jeannin (FRA); L 0–2		
Uh Young-Ho	Men's Singles 1C	bye	Aldo Licciardi (ITA); W 2–1	G. Bunderud (SWE); L 0–2		
Choi Tae-Am	Men's Singles 2	bye	See Yang Choi (HKG); W 2–1	Fritz Altendorfer (AUT); W 2–0	K. Kuijala (FIN); W 2–0	Franz Mandl (AUT); L 0–2
Nam Kwi-Teak	Men's Singles 2	Carlo Jannucci (ITA); W 2–0	G. Nilsson (SWE); L 0–2			
Choi Dong-Sik	Men's Singles 3	bye	Andre Hennaert (FRA); W 2–0	H. Gentner (FRG); W 2–0	Michael Cunningham (IRL); W 2–0	Engelbert Rangger (AUT); W 2–0
Yang Un-Seung	Men's Singles 3	B. Edbrom (SWE); W 2–0	Heinz Simon (FRG); W 2–1	Engelbert Rangger (AUT); Lose		
Kim So-Boo	Men's Singles 4	bye	P. Glaese (FRG); W 2–0	Michael Dempsey (USA); L 0–2		
Uh Young-Ho; Kim Si-Un	Men's Teams 1C	n/a		bye	Aldo Licciardi / Paolo D'Agostini (ITA); W 3–1	G. Laner / B. Boerstler (FRG); L 0–3
Choi Tae-Am; Nam Kwi-Teak	Men's Teams 2	n/a	bye	Manfred Emmel / R. Loercher (FRG); L 1–3		
Kim So-Boo; Choi Dong-Sik	Men's Teams 4	n/a	bye	Franz Nietlispach / Wolfgang Henklotz (SUI); W 3–2	Michael Dempsey / Gary Kerr / T. Kaus (USA); L 2–3	K. Lerner / Martin Huegenich (FRG); W 3–0
