= Spain at the 1980 Summer Paralympics =

- IPC code: ESP
- NPC: Spanish Paralympic Committee
- Website: www.paralimpicos.es (in Spanish)

in Arnhem
- Medals: Gold 1 Silver 13 Bronze 9 Total 23

Summer Paralympics appearances (overview)
- 1968; 1972; 1976; 1980; 1984; 1988; 1992; 1996; 2000; 2004; 2008; 2012; 2016; 2020; 2024

In 1980, Spain had competitors in archery, wheelchair basketball, swimming and athletics.

Spain won 1 gold medal, 13 silver medals and 9 bronze medals.

== Background ==
The 1980 Games were held in Arnhem, The Netherlands. They could not be co-hosted with the Olympics because the Soviet Union claimed the country had no people with disabilities. Competitors with spinal cord injuries, amputations, cerebral palsy and vision impairments were eligible to compete in these Games.

== Athletics ==
None of Spain's gold medals, three silvers and three bronzed medals came in athletics. Three of the medals were won by blind athletes and three were won by athletes with physical disabilities.

Event	Gold	Silver	Bronze
1500 m F	Karl Schroeder; West Germany	J. Alexandre; France	J. Santos; Spain
High jump E	Jan Krauz; Poland	Walter Kessler; Switzerland	Andres Garcia; Spain
Long jump E	Jan Krauz; Poland	Andres Garcia; Spain	Jerzy Dabrowski; Poland
Triple jump B	Andrzej Pawlik; Poland	N. Alvarez; Spain	Kalle Hautalahti; Finland
100 m B	Grazyna Kozlowska; Poland	June Smith; United States	G. Madrid; Spain
400 m A	Lou Keller; United States	Purificacion Santamarta; Spain	Eva Johansson; Sweden

== Swimming ==
One of Spain's gold medals, ten silvers and six bronze medals came in swimming. None of the medals were won by blind athletes. All medals were won by competitors with physical disabilities.

Event	Gold	Silver	Bronze
25 m butterfly 3	Arkadiusz Pawlowski; Poland	Miroslaw Owczarek; Poland	Francisco Flores; Spain
50 m butterfly 5	Eugenio Jimenez; Spain	Ryszard Machowczyk; Poland	H. G. Heynen; Netherlands
50 m freestyle 3	Miroslaw Owczarek; Poland	Arkadiusz Pawlowski; Poland	Francisco Flores; Spain
100 m backstroke 5	Ryszard Machowczyk; Poland	Eugenio Jimenez; Spain	Tore Nilsson; Sweden
4x25 m individual medley 3	Arkadiusz Pawlowski; Poland	Miroslaw Owczarek; Poland	Francisco Flores; Spain
4x50 m individual medley 5	Ryszard Machowczyk; Poland	Lars-Gunnar Andersson; Sweden	Eugenio Jimenez; Spain
25 m butterfly 4	G. Ignaczuk; Poland	Teresa Herreras; Spain	I. Wownuk; Canada
100 m backstroke 4	G. Ignaczuk; Poland	Teresa Herreras; Spain	C. Salden; Netherlands
100 m backstroke 6	Agnieszka Ogorzelska; Poland	Pilar Jabaloyas; Spain	None
100 m breaststroke 4	G. Ignaczuk; Poland	Teresa Herreras; Spain	J. Orpwood; Great Britain
100 m breaststroke 6	Agnieszka Ogorzelska; Poland	Pilar Jabaloyas; Spain	None
100 m butterfly 6	Agnieszka Ogorzelska; Poland	Pilar Jabaloyas; Spain	None
100 m freestyle 4	G. Ignaczuk; Poland	Monika Lindstrom; Sweden	Teresa Herreras; Spain
100 m freestyle 6	Agnieszka Ogorzelska; Poland	Pilar Jabaloyas; Spain	Christine Morgan; Bahamas
4x50 m individual medley 4	G. Ignaczuk; Poland	Teresa Herreras; Spain	M. Crespeau; France
4x50 m individual medley 6	Agnieszka Ogorzelska; Poland	Pilar Jabaloyas; Spain	None
4 × 100 m medley relay 1A-6	Poland (POL)	Netherlands (NED)	Spain (ESP)
