= Table tennis at the 1980 Summer Paralympics =

Table tennis at the VI Paralympic Games
- Paralympic Table tennis

Table tennis at the 1980 Summer Paralympics consisted of 32 events, 22 for men and 10 for women.

== Medal table ==
Rank	Nation	Gold	Silver	Bronze	Total
1	West Germany (FRG)	9	2	6	17
2	Switzerland (SUI)	5	2	0	7
3	Netherlands (NED)	4	4	6	14
4	Great Britain (GBR)	4	3	0	7
5	Austria (AUT)	2	5	0	7
6	United States (USA)	2	1	2	5
7	Yugoslavia (YUG)	2	1	0	3
8	South Korea (KOR)	1	2	1	4
9	Ireland (IRL)	1	1	1	3
9	Norway (NOR)	1	1	1	3
11	Sweden (SWE)	0	5	1	6
12	France (FRA)	0	1	5	6
13	Egypt (EGY)	0	1	1	2
13	Finland (FIN)	0	1	1	2
15	Zimbabwe (ZIM)	0	1	0	1
16	Canada (CAN)	0	0	1	1
16	Hong Kong (HKG)	0	0	1	1
16	Italy (ITA)	0	0	1	1
16	Jamaica (JAM)	0	0	1	1
16	Mexico (MEX)	0	0	1	1
Totals (20 entries)		31	31	30	92

== Medal summary ==
=== Men's events ===
Event	Gold	Silver	Bronze
Singles 1A	Hans Rosenast; Switzerland	Rolf Zumkehr; Switzerland	Matti Launonen; Finland
Singles 1B	Tommy Taylor; Great Britain	G. Frank; Austria	Bruno Hassler; West Germany
Singles 1C	Manfred Emmel; West Germany	B. Boerstler; West Germany	Daniel Jeannin; France
Singles 2	Franz Mandl; Austria	Tae Am Choi; South Korea	Gary Kerr; United States
Singles 3	Dong Sik Chou; South Korea	Engelbert Rangger; Austria	Rob Brand; Netherlands
Singles 4	Michael Dempsey; United States	Grady Uyt de Boogaardt; Netherlands	Loek van den Leur; Netherlands
Singles C	Manfred Knabe; West Germany	Ed Baas; Netherlands	H. J. Hoppe; West Germany
Singles C1	M. Stephens; United States	Salem Mohamed El Zeini; Egypt	Ahmed Mohamed Salama; Egypt
Singles D	P. Kroll; West Germany	P. Chassagne; France	G. Chrak; Canada
Singles E	Svetislav Dimitrijevic; Yugoslavia	Franc Simunic; Yugoslavia	H. Lieven; West Germany
Singles F	K. Kelzenberg; West Germany	E. Larsson; Sweden	L. Mauelshagen; West Germany
Singles J	G. Majer; West Germany	Tom Suters; Netherlands	Jacques Berings; Netherlands
Teams 1A	Switzerland (SUI); Hans Rosenast; Rolf Zumkehr	Finland (FIN); Pekka Hatinen; Matti Launonen	Norway (NOR); Casper Caspersen; Jan Erik Stenberg
Teams 1B	Great Britain (GBR); S. Bradshaw; Tommy Taylor	Austria (AUT); G. Frank; Walter Sailer	United States (USA); Kenneth Brooks; Bernard McNichol
Teams 1C	West Germany (FRG); B. Boerstler; G. Laner	South Korea (KOR); Si Un Kim; Jong Hoe Uh	Netherlands (NED); Fred Broos; Paul Suijkerbuijk
Teams 2	West Germany (FRG); Manfred Emmel; R. Loercher	Austria (AUT); Fritz Altendorfer; Franz Mandl	France (FRA); G. Caillon; Michel Peeters
Teams 3	West Germany (FRG); H. Gentner; Heinz Simon	Switzerland (SUI); Erich Buehler; Peter Mrose	France (FRA); Andre Hennaert; Daniel Jeannin
Teams 4	Netherlands (NED); Grady Uyt de Boogaardt; Loek van den Leur	United States (USA); Michael Dempsey; T. Kaus; Gary Kerr	South Korea (KOR); Dong Sik Choi; So Boo Kim
Teams C	Netherlands (NED); Ed Baas; Cock Hill	West Germany (FRG); H. J. Hoppe; Manfred Knabe; P. Kroll	Hong Kong (HKG); Hon Keung Tong; Shek Kau Wong
Teams D	France (FRA); Pierre Cathelineau; P. Chassagne	Netherlands (NED); Victor Hertog; Theo van Kessel	Belgium (BEL); Jozef de Vriese; Noel van Dooren
Teams E	Yugoslavia (YUG); Svetislav Dimitrijevic; Franc Simunic	Sweden (SWE); S. Johansson; A. Pettersson	West Germany (FRG); W. Huhnerbein; H. Lieven
Teams F	West Germany (FRG); K. Kelzenberg; L. Mauelshagen	Sweden (SWE); K. Bergstrom; E. Larsson	Netherlands (NED); Jacques Berings; Tom Suters

=== Women's events ===
Event	Gold	Silver	Bronze
Singles 1A	Julie Toomey; Ireland	Sandra James; Zimbabwe	Josefina Cornejo; Mexico
Singles 1B	Jane Blackburn; Great Britain	M. Lijsen; Norway	Rosa Sicari; Italy
Singles 2	Elisabeth Bisquolm; Switzerland	Rosa Schweizer; Austria	Ruth Lamsbach; West Germany
Singles 3	Verena Chiari; Switzerland	J. Swann; Great Britain	R. Andre; France
Singles 4	Irene Schmidt; Netherlands	L. Karlsson; Sweden	Gerda Becker; Netherlands
Singles C	A. Smith; Great Britain	G. Bosrup; Sweden	N. Kabous; France
Teams 1B	Norway (NOR); A. Klausen; Marit Lysen	Ireland (IRL); Frances O'Sullivan; John Twomey	None
Teams 2	Austria (AUT); Rosa Schweizer; A. Wicher	Great Britain (GBR); Jane Blackburn; G. Matthews	Ireland (IRL); Angela Hendra; Anne Sinnott
Teams 3	Switzerland (SUI); Elisabeth Bisquolm; Verena Chiari	France (FRA); R. Andre; Maguy Ramousse	Jamaica (JAM); Jennifer Brown; Quida White
Teams 4	Netherlands (NED); Gerda Becker; Irene Schmidt	Great Britain (GBR); B. Gibbs; J. Swann	Sweden (SWE); L. Karlsson; R. Soderberg
