= Short metric round open medalists =

The short western round open (changed to short metric round open in 1976). Both men and women competed in this event.

== Men's short western round open ==
| Event | Gold | Silver | Bronze |
|---|---|---|---|
| 1972 Heidelberg | W. Kokott; South Africa | Jay Brown; United States | Keun Soo Kim; South Korea |
| 1976 Toronto | Shigenobu Hashiguchi; Japan | Yoon Bae Kim; South Korea | Alan Corrie; Great Britain |

== Men's short metric round paraplegic ==
| Event | Gold | Silver | Bronze |
|---|---|---|---|
| 1980 Arnhem | J. M. Chapuis; France | L. Zeise; United States | J. Thion; France |
| 1984 New York/Stoke Mandeville | Michel Baudois; Switzerland | H. S. Kim; South Korea | Pasquale de Masi; Italy |
| 1988 Seoul | Martti Rantavouri; Finland | Narumi Fujii; Japan | Michael Stauner; United States |

== Men's short metric round tetraplegic ==
| Event | Gold | Silver | Bronze |
|---|---|---|---|
| 1976 Toronto | West Brownlow; United States | None | None |
| 1980 Arnhem | Siegmar Henker; West Germany | Ian Trewhella; Australia | Svein Kristiansen; Norway |
| 1984 New York/Stoke Mandeville | Kenneth Holm; Sweden | None | None |

== Men's short western round team open ==
| Event | Gold | Silver | Bronze |
|---|---|---|---|
| 1972 Heidelberg | France (FRA) | United States (USA) | West Germany (FRG) |
| 1976 Toronto | Great Britain (GBR) | Finland (FIN) | None |
| 1984 New York/Stoke Mandeville | France (FRA) | Australia (AUS) | Great Britain (GBR) |

== Women's short western round open ==
| Event | Gold | Silver | Bronze |
|---|---|---|---|
| 1972 Heidelberg | Girard; France | van der Merwe; South Africa | Becker; West Germany |
| 1976 Toronto | S. Battran; West Germany | Waltraud Hagenlocher; West Germany | G. Matthews; Great Britain |
| 1980 Arnhem | Rosa Schweizer; Austria | Valerie Williamson; Great Britain | None |
| 1984 New York/Stoke Mandeville | M. P. Balme; France | Rosa Schweizer; Austria | Anne Gray; Great Britain |
