= Advanced metric round open medalists =

Paralympic archery champions

Advanced metric round open events were featured for Archery from 1976 to 1984 in the Summer Paralympic Games.

== Men's events ==
There were four men's events between 1976 and 1984.

=== Men's advanced metric round open ===
Event	Gold	Silver	Bronze
1976 Toronto	R. Schmidberger; West Germany	Thore; France	Hohman; West Germany
1980 Arnhem	Yoon Bae Kim; South Korea	M. Petschnig; Austria	Felix Lettner; Austria

=== Men's advanced metric round paraplegic ===
Event	Gold	Silver	Bronze
1984 New York/Stoke Mandeville	J. M. Chapuis; France	C. Bouchite; France	Patrick Krishner; United States

=== Men's advanced metric round team open ===
Event	Gold	Silver	Bronze
1976 Toronto	France (FRA)	West Germany (FRG)	Sweden (SWE)
1984 New York/Stoke Mandeville	France (FRA)	None	None

=== Men's advanced metric round tetraplegic ===
Event	Gold	Silver	Bronze
1976 Toronto	T. Parker; Canada	None	None
1980 Arnhem	Yoon Bae Kim; South Korea	M. Petschnig; Austria	Felix Lettner; Austria
1984 New York/Stoke Mandeville	G. Frank; Austria	Ian Trewhella; Australia	Ernest Arnold; Great Britain

== Women's events ==
Only one women's advanced metric round open occurred between 1976 and 1980.

=== Women's advanced metric open ===
Event	Gold	Silver	Bronze
1976 Toronto	Mireille Maraschin; France	Karlsen; Norway	O. Holen; Norway
1980 Arnhem	K. Unsciker; United States	Eve. M. Rimmer; New Zealand	G. Matthews; Great Britain
