= Canada at the 1980 Summer Paralympics =

- Flag of Canada
- IPC code: CAN
- NPC: Canadian Paralympic Committee
- Website: www.paralympic.ca

in Arnhem
- Competitors: 94
- Medals Ranked 4th: Gold 64 Silver 35 Bronze 31 Total 130

Summer Paralympics appearances (overview)
- 1968; 1972; 1976; 1980; 1984; 1988; 1992; 1996; 2000; 2004; 2008; 2012; 2016; 2020; 2024

Canada competed at the 1980 Summer Paralympics in Arnhem, Netherlands. 94 competitors from Canada won 130 medals including 64 gold, 35 silver and 31 bronze and finished 4th in the medal table.

== Medallists ==
Medal	Name	Sport	Event
Gold	T. Parker	Archery	Men's double FITA round tetraplegic
Gold	Magella Belanger	Athletics	Men's 100m C
Gold	Denis Lapalme	Athletics	Men's 100m C1
Gold	Patrick York	Athletics	Men's 400m A
Gold	Joe Harrison	Athletics	Men's 400m D
Gold	Rick Hansen	Athletics	Men's 800m 4
Gold	Mel Fitzgerald	Athletics	Men's 800m 5
Gold	Mel Fitzgerald	Athletics	Men's 1500m 5
Gold	Jacques Pilon	Athletics	Men's 1500m A
Gold	Paul English	Athletics	Men's 1500m B
Gold	Ernie Lambier	Athletics	Men's high jump A
Gold	Arnold Boldt	Athletics	Men's high jump D
Gold	Arnold Boldt	Athletics	Men's long jump D
Gold	Eugene Reimer	Athletics	Men's discus throw 4
Gold	Denis Lapalme	Athletics	Men's javelin throw C1
Gold	Dan Leonard	Athletics	Men's javelin throw F
Gold	Doug Lyons	Athletics	Men's shot put 4
Gold	Al Heaver	Athletics	Men's pentathlon C
Gold	Chris Facey	Athletics	Men's pentathlon E
Gold	Dan Leonard	Athletics	Men's pentathlon F
Gold	Anne Farrell	Athletics	Women's 100m C
Gold	Giselle Cole	Athletics	Women's 100m F1
Gold	Giselle Cole	Athletics	Women's 400m F1
Gold	Cheryl Hurd	Athletics	Women's 3000m walk A
Gold	Sue Grimstead	Athletics	Women's high jump D
Gold	Anne Farrell	Athletics	Women's long jump C
Gold	Sue Grimstead	Athletics	Women's long jump D
Gold	Giselle Cole	Athletics	Women's long jump F1
Gold	Anne Farrell	Athletics	Women's discus throw C
Gold	Sarah Baker	Athletics	Women's discus throw C1
Gold	Stephania Balta	Athletics	Women's discus throw D
Gold	Anne Farrell	Athletics	Women's javelin throw C
Gold	Sarah Baker	Athletics	Women's javelin throw C1
Gold	Stephania Balta	Athletics	Women's javelin throw D
Gold	Anne Farrell	Athletics	Women's shot put C
Gold	Stephania Balta	Athletics	Women's shot put D
Gold	Joanne McDonald	Athletics	Women's slalom 5
Gold	Stephania Balta	Athletics	Women's pentathlon D
Gold	Mark Burger	Swimming	Men's 25m breaststroke 1B
Gold	Mark Burger	Swimming	Men's 25m freestyle 1B
Gold	Gary Collins-Simpson	Swimming	Men's 100m backstroke C-D
Gold	Denis Lapalme	Swimming	Men's 100m backstroke C1-D1
Gold	Timothy McIsaac	Swimming	Men's 100m breaststroke A
Gold	Timothy McIsaac	Swimming	Men's 100m butterfly A
Gold	Timothy McIsaac	Swimming	Men's 200m individual medley A
Gold	Gary Collins-Simpson	Swimming	Men's 200m individual medley C
Gold	Timothy McIsaac	Swimming	Men's 400m individual medley A
Gold	Josee Lake	Swimming	Women's 50m backstroke J
Gold	Marjorie Seargeant	Swimming	Women's 50m breaststroke F
Gold	Josee Lake	Swimming	Women's 50m breaststroke J
Gold	Marjorie Seargeant	Swimming	Women's 50m freestyle F
Gold	Josee Lake	Swimming	Women's 50m freestyle J
Gold	Yvette Michel	Swimming	Women's 100m backstroke A
Gold	Jackie Mitchell	Swimming	Women's 100m backstroke C-D
Gold	Yvette Michel	Swimming	Women's 100m breaststroke A
Gold	Cheryl Kristiansen	Swimming	Women's 100m breaststroke C
Gold	Andrea Rossi	Swimming	Women's 100m butterfly A
Gold	Cheryl Kristiansen	Swimming	Women's 100m butterfly C
Gold	Yvette Michel	Swimming	Women's 100m freestyle A
Gold	Yvette Michel	Swimming	Women's 200m individual medley A
Gold	Cheryl Kristiansen	Swimming	Women's 200m individual medley C
Gold	Kim Kilpatrick	Swimming	Women's 400m individual medley A
Gold	Women's relay team	Swimming	Women's 4x100m freestyle relay C-D
Gold	S. Breddlove	Wrestling	Men's -57kg
Silver	Gary Birch	Athletics	Men's 60m 1A
Silver	Mel Fitzgerald	Athletics	Men's 100m 5
Silver	Tony Wills	Athletics	Men's 100m C
Silver	Joe Harrison	Athletics	Men's 100m D
Silver	Charles Peart	Athletics	Men's 100m F1
Silver	Rick Hansen	Athletics	Men's 1500m 4
Silver	Chris Facey	Athletics	Men's 1500m E
Silver	Tony Wills	Athletics	Men's high jump C
Silver	Charles Peart	Athletics	Men's long jump F1
Silver	Al Heaver	Athletics	Men's discus throw C
Silver	Dan Leonard	Athletics	Men's discus throw F
Silver	Gilles Marois	Athletics	Men's javelin throw B
Silver	Al Heaver	Athletics	Men's javelin throw D
Silver	Dan Leonard	Athletics	Men's shot put F
Silver	Karen Gillis	Athletics	Women's 100m C
Silver	Lucille Baillargeon	Athletics	Women's pentathlon B
Silver	Laszlo Decsi	Shooting	Men's air pistol amputee
Silver	Yvon Page	Shooting	Mixed air rifle prone 1A-1C
Silver	Yvon Page	Shooting	Mixed air rifle standing 1A-1C
Silver	Jeff Stanfield	Swimming	Men's 100m breaststroke 4
Silver	Denis Lapalme	Swimming	Men's 100m breaststroke C1
Silver	Larry Gardner	Swimming	Men's 100m breaststroke D
Silver	G. Collins-Simpson	Swimming	Men's 100m butterfly C
Silver	Timothy McIsaac	Swimming	Men's 100m freestyle A
Silver	Marjorie Seargeant	Swimming	Women's 50m backstroke F
Silver	Lisa Bentz	Swimming	Women's 100m breaststroke B
Silver	Jackie Mitchell	Swimming	Women's 100m breaststroke D
Silver	Margaret Nicholson	Swimming	Women's 100m butterfly D
Silver	Jackie Mitchell	Swimming	Women's 100m freestyle C-D
Silver	Jackie Mitchell	Swimming	Women's 400m freestyle C-D
Silver	Andrea Rossi	Swimming	Women's 200m individual medley A
Silver	Jackie Mitchell	Swimming	Women's 200m individual medley D
Silver	Women's relay team	Swimming	Women's 4x100m freestyle relay A-B
Silver	Women's relay team	Swimming	Women's 4x100m medley relay A-B
Silver	P. Moreton	Wrestling	Men's -74kg
Silver	Victor Pereira	Wrestling	Men's -90kg
Bronze	Charles Peart	Athletics	Men's 400m F1
Bronze	Eddie Morten	Athletics	Men's 5000m walk B
Bronze	Mel Fitzgerald; Rick Hansen; Ron Minor; André Viger	Athletics	Men's 4x100m relay 2-5
Bronze	Yvan Bourdeau	Athletics	Men's long jump A
Bronze	Dennis Cherenko	Athletics	Men's club throw 1B
Bronze	Dale Vincent	Athletics	Men's discus throw J
Bronze	John Donahue	Athletics	Men's shot put 1B
Bronze	Dale Vincent	Athletics	Men's shot put J
Bronze	Ed Batt	Athletics	Men's slalom 1A
Bronze	Ron Minor	Athletics	Men's slalom 4
Bronze	Pam Frazee	Athletics	Women's 400m 3
Bronze	Lily Wong	Athletics	Women's 800m B
Bronze	Cheryl Hurd	Athletics	Women's high jump A
Bronze	Anna Ostapa	Athletics	Women's high jump B
Bronze	Karen Gillis	Athletics	Women's long jump C
Bronze	Lily Wong	Athletics	Women's javelin throw B
Bronze	Yvon Page	Shooting	Mixed air rifle 3 positions 1A-1C
Bronze	Gary Birch	Swimming	Men's 25m backstroke 1A
Bronze	Mark Burger	Swimming	Men's 25m backstroke 1B
Bronze	Jeff Stanfield	Swimming	Men's 100m backstroke 4
Bronze	Larry Gardner	Swimming	Men's 100m butterfly D
Bronze	Denis Lapalme	Swimming	Men's 100m freestyle C1-D1
Bronze	Lee Grenon	Swimming	Men's 400m individual medley B
Bronze	Gary Birch; Mark Burger; T. Parker	Swimming	Men's 3x25m freestyle relay 1A-1C
Bronze	Men's relay team	Swimming	Men's 4x100m freestyle relay A-B
Bronze	Men's relay team	Swimming	Men's 4x100m medley relay A-B
Bronze	Irene Wownuk	Swimming	Women's 25m butterfly 4
Bronze	Andrea Rossi	Swimming	Women's 100m backstroke A
Bronze	Sarah Baker	Swimming	Women's 100m freestyle C1-D1
Bronze	Margaret Nicholson	Swimming	Women's 400m freestyle C-D
Bronze	G. Chrak	Table tennis	Men's singles D

== See also ==
- Canada at the Paralympics
