= Athletics at the 1980 Summer Paralympics – Women's 100 metres B =

Women's 100 metres B at the VI Paralympic Games
- Paralympic Athletics
- Competitors: 16 from 11 nations

Medalists
1st place, gold medalist(s)		Grazyna Kozlowska	Poland
2nd place, silver medalist(s)		June Smith	United States
3rd place, bronze medalist(s)		G. Madrid	Spain

The Women's 100 metres B was a sprinting event in athletics at the 1980 Summer Paralympics in Arnhem, for blind athletes. (Visually impaired athletes may also have been permitted to take part; the specifics are unclear from the International Paralympic Committee's records.) Sixteen athletes from eleven nations took part; defending champion R. Laengen, of Norway, was not among them.

The athletes were divided into six heats, with two or three athletes competing in each heat. It is unclear from the IPC records how the qualification process functioned, or whether there were more than two rounds, but it seems that only three athletes were permitted to qualify for the final. As they were the three fastest runners overall in the heats, they may have qualified directly from the heats.

== Results ==
=== Heats ===
In heat 1, Bozena Kwiatkowska of Poland won in 13.90s, setting a new world record. Kwiatkowska had been the fastest qualifier from the heats in the 100 metres B race at the 1976 Paralympics, but had subsequently withdrawn before the final. At the Arnhem Games, she won her heat comfortably, in front of J. Wilson of Australia (14.90s) and Jaana Oikarainen of Finland (15.30s).

In heat 2, Gabriele Berghofer of Austria matched Kwiatkowska's world record time, winning ahead of Finland's A. Parviainen (14.70s) and Switzerland's Erika Wappis, who ran the slowest race of the heats in 15.90s.

In heat 3, June Smith of the United States broke Kwiatkowska's world record and set a new one in 13.50s, beating Great Britain's P. Coote (13.90s) and Canada's L. Baillargeon (14.50s).

In heat 4, West Germany's I. Schafhausen and the United States' Donna Webb both finished in 13.80s, but the German crossed the line first to win. Third and last was Canada's A. Ostapa (14.70s).

In heat 5, only two athletes were scheduled to race, and only Cz. Jach of Poland actually completed the heat, in 14.00s. Denmark's Else Hansen has no recorded time or rank, meaning she was either a non-starter, or did not finish the race due to injury, or was disqualified.

The sixth and last heat also had only two competitors, and was the fastest heat. Poland's Grazyna Kozlowska won it with the fastest time of the heats (13.60s), just ahead of Spain's G. Madrid (13.80s).

Kozlowska, Smith and Madrid advanced to the final, despite Schafhausen and Webb's recorded times being the same as Madrid's. This may be due to the recorded times in the heats having been rounded; the recorded times in the final appear more precise.

=== Final ===
Place	Athlete	Time
1	Grazyna Kozlowska (POL)	13.57
2	June Smith (USA)	13.78
3	G. Madrid (ESP)	14.06
