= Dartchery at the 1980 Summer Paralympics =

Dartchery at the VI Paralympic Games

Dartchery at the 1980 Summer Paralympics consisted of three events.

== Medal summary ==
Event	Gold	Silver	Bronze
Men's pairs open	West Germany (FRG)	Norway (NOR)	United States (USA)
Women's pairs open	Finland (FIN)	New Zealand (NZL)	Great Britain (GBR); Gill Matthews; Valerie Williamson
Mixed pairs open	Sweden (SWE)	Belgium (BEL)	Norway (NOR)
