= Athletics at the 1980 Summer Paralympics – Men's 100 metres B =

Men's 100 metres B at the VI Paralympic Games
- Paralympic Athletics
- Competitors: 40 from 21 nations

Medalists
1st place, gold medalist(s)		Jerzy Landos	Poland
2nd place, silver medalist(s)		Winford Haynes	United States
3rd place, bronze medalist(s)		Jozef Pokrywka	Poland

The Men's 100 metres B was a sprinting event in athletics at the 1980 Summer Paralympics in Arnhem, for blind athletes. (Visually impaired athletes may also have been permitted to take part; the specifics are unclear from the International Paralympic Committee's records.) Forty athletes from twenty-one nations took part; among them was defending champion Winford Haynes, of the United States.

The athletes were divided into fourteen heats, with two or three athletes competing in each heat. It is unclear from the IPC records how the qualification process functioned, or whether there were more than two rounds, but it seems that only three athletes were permitted to qualify for the final. As they were the three fastest runners overall in the heats, they may have qualified directly from the heats.

== Results ==
=== Final ===
Place	Athlete	Time
1	Jerzy Landos (POL)	11.43
2	Winford Haynes (USA)	11.79
3	Jozef Pokrywka (POL)	11.84
