= Shooting at the 1980 Summer Paralympics =

Shooting at the VI Paralympic Games
- Paralympic Shooting

Shooting at the 1980 Summer Paralympics consisted of eleven events.

== Medal summary ==
| Event | Gold | Silver | Bronze |
|---|---|---|---|
| Men's air pistol amputee | Joel Guillon; France | Laszlo Decsi; Canada | Dick Munter; Netherlands |
| Women's air pistol amputee | Marianne Ruml; Austria | None | None |
| Mixed air pistol 2-5 | Alfred Bangerter; Switzerland | Oskar Kreuzer; Austria | Dave Tarrant; New Zealand |
| Mixed air rifle 3 positions 1A-1C | Jan Kristensen; Denmark | Barbara Caspers; Australia | Yvon Page; Canada |
| Mixed air rifle 3 positions 2-5 | J. Gruber; Austria | Libby Kosmala; Australia | Jonas Jacobsson; Sweden |
| Mixed air rifle kneeling 1A-1C | Barbara Caspers; Australia | Philip Wouters; Belgium | Jan Kristensen; Denmark |
| Mixed air rifle kneeling 2-5 | J. Gruber; Austria | Libby Kosmala; Australia | Jan van Ballenberghe; Belgium |
| Mixed air rifle prone 1A-1C | Philip Wouters; Belgium | Yvon Page; Canada | P. Hommerson; Netherlands |
| Mixed air rifle prone 2-5 | Libby Kosmala; Australia | J. Gruber; Austria | Peter Klotz; Switzerland |
| Mixed air rifle standing 1A-1C | Jan Kristensen; Denmark | Yvon Page; Canada | Barbara Caspers; Australia |
| Mixed air rifle standing 2-5 | Jonas Jacobsson; Sweden | J. Gruber; Austria | Bernard Pique; France |
