= Curt Brinkman =

Personal information
- Full name: Raymond Curtis Brinkman
- Nickname: Curt
- Born: November 21, 1953 Shelley, Idaho, US
- Died: September 8, 2010 (aged 56) Pleasant Grove, Utah, US
- Resting place: Shelley, Idaho Cemetery
- Education: Brigham Young University
- Height: 6 ft 7 in (201 cm)
Medal record
Representing United States
Men's para athletics
Paralympic Games
Gold medal – first place	1976 Toronto	100 m D1
Gold medal – first place	1980 Arnhem	400 m D1 wheelchairs
Gold medal – first place	1980 Arnhem	4×100 m relay D1
Silver medal – second place	1980 Arnhem	100 m D1 wheelchairs
Bronze medal – third place	1976 Toronto	Discus D1
Men's wheelchair marathon
Boston Marathon
Winner	1980 Boston	Men's wheelchair
- Updated on 2 May 2015

Raymond Curtis "Curt" Brinkman (November 21, 1953 – September 8, 2010) was the winner of the 1980 Boston Marathon in the men's wheelchair division. He was the first participant in the wheelchair division to come in faster than the fastest runner, coming in seventeen minutes faster than the traditional winner, setting a (then) world record of 1:55:00. He also won several Paralympic medals.
