= Kuwait at the Paralympics =

- IPC code: KUW
- NPC: Kuwait Paralympic Committee
- Medals: Gold 13 Silver 18 Bronze 23 Total 54

Summer appearances
- 1980; 1984; 1988; 1992; 1996; 2000; 2004; 2008; 2012; 2016; 2020; 2024

Kuwait made its Paralympic Games début at the 1980 Summer Paralympics in Arnhem, with a delegation in track and field. The country has participated in every subsequent edition of the Summer Paralympics, but has never taken part in the Winter Paralympics.

Kuwaiti competitors have won a total of 54 Paralympic medals, of which 13 gold, 18 silver and 23 bronze.

== Medal tallies ==
=== Summer Paralympics ===
Event	Gold	Silver	Bronze	Total	Ranking
1980 Summer Paralympics	2	2	1	5	26th
1984 Summer Paralympics	1	3	4	8	31st
1988 Summer Paralympics	5	5	7	17	25th
1992 Summer Paralympics	1	3	1	5	35th
1996 Summer Paralympics	1	1	1	3	46th
2000 Summer Paralympics	0	1	4	5	57th
2004 Summer Paralympics	1	2	3	6	48th
2008 Summer Paralympics	0	0	0	0	—
2012 Summer Paralympics	0	0	0	0	—
2016 Summer Paralympics	1	0	0	1	60th
2020 Summer Paralympics	0	1	1	2	65th
2024 Summer Paralympics	1	0	1	2	61st
Total	13	18	23	54	

== Medalists ==
Medal	Name	Games	Sport	Event
Gold	Adelah Al-Roumi	(Netherlands) 1980 Arnhem	Athletics	Women's 60m 2
Gold	Adelah Al-Roumi	(Netherlands) 1980 Arnhem	Athletics	Women's 200m 2
Silver	Shafy Merawah	(Netherlands) 1980 Arnhem	Athletics	Men's 100m 2
Silver	Adelah Al-Roumi	(Netherlands) 1980 Arnhem	Athletics	Women's shot put 2
Bronze	Shafy Merawah	(Netherlands) 1980 Arnhem	Athletics	Men's 400m 2
Gold	Adelah Al-Roumi	(United Kingdom) (United States) 1984 Stoke Mandeville/New York	Athletics	Women's discus throw 2
Silver	Hayat Al-Sabih	(United Kingdom) (United States) 1984 Stoke Mandeville/New York	Athletics	Women's precision throw C1
Silver	Adelah Al-Roumi	(United Kingdom) (United States) 1984 Stoke Mandeville/New York	Athletics	Women's shot put 2
Silver	Nezar Ahmad	(United Kingdom) (United States) 1984 Stoke Mandeville/New York	Swimming	Men's 100m butterfly 5
Bronze	Adelah Al-Roumi	(United Kingdom) (United States) 1984 Stoke Mandeville/New York	Athletics	Women's slalom 2
Bronze	Yousuf Naser	(United Kingdom) (United States) 1984 Stoke Mandeville/New York	Swimming	Men's 100m butterfly 5
Bronze	Yousuf Naser	(United Kingdom) (United States) 1984 Stoke Mandeville/New York	Swimming	Men's 4x50m individual medley 5
Bronze	Ahmad Habib Al-Saleh	(United Kingdom) (United States) 1984 Stoke Mandeville/New York	Wheelchair fencing	Men's épée individual 4-5
Gold	Adnan Al-Khulefi	(South Korea) 1988 Seoul	Athletics	Men's javelin throw 6
Gold	Husain Al-Enezi	(South Korea) 1988 Seoul	Athletics	Men's shot put 6
Gold	Adelah Al-Roumi	(South Korea) 1988 Seoul	Athletics	Women's javelin throw 2
Gold	Adelah Al-Roumi	(South Korea) 1988 Seoul	Athletics	Women's shot put 2
Silver	Ayad Al-Ali	(South Korea) 1988 Seoul	Athletics	Men's discus throw 6
Silver	Tareq Al-Naser	(South Korea) 1988 Seoul	Athletics	Men's slalom 1C
Silver	Nezar Ahmad	(South Korea) 1988 Seoul	Athletics	Men's slalom 5-6
Silver	Adelah Al-Roumi	(South Korea) 1988 Seoul	Athletics	Women's discus throw 2
Silver	Ahmad Habib Al-Saleh	(South Korea) 1988 Seoul	Wheelchair fencing	Men's épée 4-6
Bronze	Nezar Ahmad	(South Korea) 1988 Seoul	Athletics	Men's 10000m 5
Bronze	Fahed Al-Mutairi	(South Korea) 1988 Seoul	Athletics	Men's club throw C6
Bronze	Aly Mohamed	(South Korea) 1988 Seoul	Athletics	Men's javelin throw 6
Bronze	Mubarak Al-Enezi	(South Korea) 1988 Seoul	Athletics	Men's shot put 2
Bronze	Ayad Al-Ali	(South Korea) 1988 Seoul	Athletics	Men's shot put 6
Bronze	Khaled Khaled	(South Korea) 1988 Seoul	Athletics	Men's shot put C2
Bronze	Adnan Al-Khulefi	(South Korea) 1988 Seoul	Athletics	Men's pentathlon 5-6
Bronze	Ahmad Habib Al-Saleh	(South Korea) 1988 Seoul	Wheelchair fencing	Men's foil 4-6
Gold	Aly Mohamed	(Spain) 1992 Barcelona	Athletics	Men's javelin throw THW7
Silver	Fahed Al-Mutairi	(Spain) 1992 Barcelona	Athletics	Men's javelin throw C6
Silver	Aly Mohamed	(Spain) 1992 Barcelona	Athletics	Men's shot put THW7
Silver	Adelah Al-Roumi	(Spain) 1992 Barcelona	Athletics	Women's discus throw THW4
Bronze	Fouad Kout	(Spain) 1992 Barcelona	Weightlifting	Men's +90 kg
Gold	Fahed Al-Mutairi	(United States) 1996 Atlanta	Athletics	Men's javelin throw F35
Silver	Aly Mohamed	(United States) 1996 Atlanta	Athletics	Men's javelin throw F57
Bronze	Mushal Al-Otaibi	(United States) 1996 Atlanta	Athletics	Men's javelin throw F55
Silver	Atef Al-Dousari	(Australia) 2000 Sydney	Athletics	Men's discus throw F53
Bronze	Hamad Aladwani	(Australia) 2000 Sydney	Athletics	Men's 100m T53
Bronze	Ahmad Makhseed	(Australia) 2000 Sydney	Athletics	Men's javelin throw F33
Bronze	Ahmad Makhseed	(Australia) 2000 Sydney	Athletics	Men's shot put F33
Bronze	Majed Al-Mutairi	(Australia) 2000 Sydney	Athletics	Men's shot put F58
Gold	Hamad Aladwani	(Greece) 2004 Athens	Athletics	Men's 400m T53
Silver	Hamad Aladwani	(Greece) 2004 Athens	Athletics	Men's 100m T53
Silver	Hamad Aladwani	(Greece) 2004 Athens	Athletics	Men's 200m T53
Bronze	Dhari Al-Mutairi	(Greece) 2004 Athens	Athletics	Men's shot put F32
Bronze	Maha Alsheraian	(Greece) 2004 Athens	Athletics	Women's discus throw F32-34/51-53
Bronze	Maha Alsheraian	(Greece) 2004 Athens	Athletics	Women's shot put F32-34/52/53
Gold	Ahmad Almutairi	(Brazil) 2016 Rio de Janeiro	Athletics	Men's 100m T33
Silver	Ahmad Al-Mutairi	(Japan) 2020 Tokyo	Athletics	Men's 100 metres T33
Bronze	Faisal Sorour	(Japan) 2020 Tokyo	Athletics	Men's shot put F63
Gold	Faisal Sorour	(France) 2024 Paris	Athletics	Men's shot put F63
Bronze	Faisal Al-Rajehi	(France) 2024 Paris	Athletics	Men's 5000 metres T54

== See also ==
- Kuwait at the Olympics
