= Tewai Skipwith-Halatau =

New Zealand Paralympian

Personal information
- Full name: Tewai Skipwith-Halatau
- Born: 11 April 1956 (age 70)

Sport
- Country: New Zealand
- Sport: Athletics
Medal record
Women's para athletics
Representing New Zealand
Paralympic Games
Bronze medal – third place	1980 Arnhem	Women's Discus A

Tewai Skipwith-Halatau (born 11 April 1956) is a New Zealand Paralympian who competed in athletics. At the 1980 Summer Paralympics, she won a bronze medal in the Women's Discus A event.
