= Sue Hobbs =

Personal information
- Full name: Susan Hobbs
- Nationality: Australian
- Born: 1956/1957
Medal record
Women's para-athletics
Representing Australia
Paralympic Games
Silver medal – second place	1980 Arnhem	60 m 5
Silver medal – second place	1980 Arnhem	800 m 5
Silver medal – second place	1980 Arnhem	1,500 m 5

Susan Hobbs (born 1956/1957) is an Australian para-athlete and wheelchair basketball player. Hobbs was the first woman to captain the Australian women's wheelchair basketball team and was inducted into Basketball Australia's Hall of Fame in 2013.

She was from South Australia. In 1976, at the age of 19, a car accident left her a paraplegic. At the 1980 Arnhem Games, she competed in four athletics events and won three silver medals – Women's 60 m 5, Women's 800 m 5 and the Women's 1,500 m 5. She organised the first Australian women's wheelchair basketball team. She was the captain of the women's basketball team at the 1992 Barcelona Games. Basketball Australia established the Sue Hobbs Medallist for the Australian International Women's Wheelchair Player of the Year.

In 1999, she was diagnosed with multiple sclerosis. After the symptoms prevented her from undertaking paid employment, she began volunteering for Multiple Sclerosis Society of SA and the Northern Territory Inc.
