= Athletics at the 1980 Summer Paralympics – Women's 4 × 60 metre relay CP D =

Women's 4x60 metre relay CP D at the VI Paralympic Games
- Paralympic Athletics
- Competitors: 1 team from 1 nation

Medalists
1st place, gold medalist(s)		no medal awarded

The Women's 4x60 metre relay CP D was an event held in athletics at the 1980 Summer Paralympics in Arnhem.

The United States team were the only team in contention, and needed simply to complete the event -as they had done in the women's 4x60 metre relay CP C event- in order to win the gold medal. The team were disqualified, however. Consequently, no team completed the event, and no medal was awarded.

Rank	Athlete	Points
unranked	team (USA)	dq
