= 1980 Summer Paralympics medal table =

1980 Summer Paralympics medals
- Location: Arnhem Netherlands

Highlights
- Most gold medals: United States (75)
- Most total medals: United States (195)
- Medalling NPCs: 40

The 1980 Summer Paralympics medal table is a list of National Paralympic Committees (NPCs) ranked by the number of gold medals won by their athletes during the 1980 Summer Paralympics, held in Arnhem, Netherlands, from June 21 to 30, 1980.

== Medal table ==
The ranking in this table is based on information provided by the International Paralympic Committee (IPC) and is consistent with IPC convention in its published medal tables. By default, the table is ordered by the number of gold medals the athletes from a nation have won (in this context, a "nation" is an entity represented by a National Paralympic Committee). The number of silver medals is taken into consideration next and then the number of bronze medals. If nations are still tied, equal ranking is given and they are listed alphabetically by IPC country code.

To sort this table by nation, total medal count, or any other column, click on the icon next to the column title.

* Host nation (Netherlands)

Rank	Nation	Gold	Silver	Bronze	Total
1	United States	75	66	54	195
2	Poland	75	50	52	177
3	West Germany	68	48	46	162
4	Canada	64	35	31	130
5	Great Britain	47	32	21	100
6	Netherlands*	33	31	36	100
7	Sweden	31	36	24	91
8	France	28	26	31	85
9	Mexico	20	16	6	42
10	Norway	15	13	8	36
11	Austria	14	23	8	45
12	Israel	13	18	15	46
13	Belgium	13	12	17	42
14	Australia	12	21	22	55
15	Switzerland	9	10	10	29
16	Japan	9	10	7	26
17	Finland	8	19	13	40
18	Jamaica	7	7	5	19
19	New Zealand	7	6	6	19
20	Italy	6	5	9	20
21	Denmark	6	4	7	17
22	Egypt	4	7	3	14
23	Yugoslavia	4	5	9	18
24	Argentina	4	5	6	15
25	Ireland	4	2	11	17
26	Kuwait	2	2	1	5
26	South Korea	2	2	1	5
28	Indonesia	2	0	4	6
29	Spain	1	13	9	23
30	Kenya	1	2	0	3
31	Colombia	1	0	1	2
31	Iceland	1	0	1	2
33	Sudan	1	0	0	1
34	Zimbabwe	0	8	4	12
35	Bahamas	0	1	2	3
35	Hong Kong	0	1	2	3
37	Czechoslovakia	0	1	1	2
38	Greece	0	0	1	1
38	Luxembourg	0	0	1	1
38	Malta	0	0	1	1
Totals (40 entries)		587	537	486	1,610

== See also ==
- 1980 Summer Olympics medal table
- 1980 Winter Paralympics medal table
