= Ana María Tenorio =

Mexican Paralympic athlete

Personal information
- Born: 1954 (age 71–72) Mexico City, Mexico

Sport
- Sport: Paralympic athletics Paralympic swimming Para archery
Medal record
Representing Mexico
Paralympic Games
Bronze medal – third place	1980 Arnhem	Pentathlon 4
Bronze medal – third place	1980 Arnhem	800m 4

Ana María Tenorio Carapia (born 1954) is a Mexican former Paralympic athlete who competed in five different sports at the 1976 and 1980 Summer Paralympics.

Her daughters, Ana Loza Tenorio and Sandra Loza Tenorio are also archers. Ana won gold at the 2000 Pan American Archery Championships and Sandra is a coach for the Mexican national archery team.
