= Kaye Firth =

New Zealand Paralympian

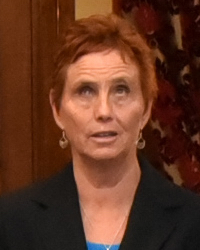
- Firth in 2020

Sport
- Country: New Zealand
- Sport: Athletics, Swimming
Medal record
Women's para athletics
Representing New Zealand
Paralympic Games
Gold medal – first place	1980 Arnhem	Pentathlon B

Kaye Firth is a New Zealand Paralympian who competed in athletics and swimming. At the 1980 Summer Paralympics, she won a gold medal in the Pentathlon B.
