= Ross Hynds =

New Zealand Paralympic athlete

Personal information
- Full name: David Ross Hynds
- Nationality: New Zealander
- Born: 15 September 1946
- Died: 25 June 2015 (aged 68) Tauranga, New Zealand

Sport
- Sport: Archery; Athletics
Medal record
Men's para athletics
Representing New Zealand
Paralympic Games
Silver medal – second place	1980 Arnhem	Discus Throw 1C
Bronze medal – third place	1976 Toronto	Discus Throw 1C
Bronze medal – third place	1980 Arnhem	Shot Put 1C
Bronze medal – third place	1984 New York & Stoke Mandeville	Discus Throw 1C

David Ross Hynds (15 September 1946 – 25 June 2015) was a New Zealand Paralympic sportsperson. In the 1976 Summer Paralympics he competed in athletics, winning a bronze medal in the men's discus throw 1C. Hynds made his debut at these Games, going on to represent New Zealand at the 1976, 1980, 1984, and 1992 in archery and athletics.

Hynds attended Saint Kentigern Old Collegians. When he was a 22-year-old, he was in a car accident that left him a paraplegic. Starting in 1970, he started competing in New Zealand's National Disabled Championships and would compete in it for 30 straight years. At the 1974 Commonwealth Paraplegic Games, he served as New Zealand's Vice Captain. After the Games, he made the switch to wheelchair rugby, making New Zealand's first national team in 1991. He also took up sailing, representing New Zealand internationally from 1988 to 1998. In 2006, he was awarded Order of Merit for outstanding service to Paralympic Sport. He died in 2015.
