= Kuwait at the 2020 Summer Paralympics =

- IPC code: KUW
- NPC: Kuwait Paralympic Committee

in Tokyo
- Competitors: 2 in 1 sports
- Medals Ranked 71st: Gold 0 Silver 1 Bronze 1 Total 2

Summer Paralympics appearances (overview)
- 1980; 1984; 1988; 1992; 1996; 2000; 2004; 2008; 2012; 2016; 2020; 2024

Kuwait competed at the 2020 Summer Paralympics in Tokyo, Japan, from 24 August to 5 September 2021.

== Medalists ==
Medal	Name	Sport	Event	Date
Silver	Ahmad Al-Mutairi	Athletics	Men's 100 metres T33	30 August
Bronze	Faisal Sorour	Athletics	Men's shot put F63	4 September

== Athletics ==
Ahmad Almutairi (100m T33), successfully to break through the qualifications for the 2020 Paralympics after breaking the qualification limit. He won the silver medal in the men's 100 metres T33 event.

Faisal Sorour won the bronze medal in the men's shot put F63 event.
