= Mexico at the 1980 Summer Paralympics =

- IPC code: MEX
- NPC: Federacion Mexicana de Deporte

in Arnhem
- Competitors: 28
- Medals Ranked 9th: Gold 20 Silver 16 Bronze 6 Total 42

Summer Paralympics appearances (overview)
- 1972; 1976; 1980; 1984; 1988; 1992; 1996; 2000; 2004; 2008; 2012; 2016; 2020; 2024

Mexico sent a delegation to compete at the 1980 Summer Paralympics in Arnhem, Netherlands. Its athletes finished ninth in the overall medal count.

== Medalists ==
Medal	Name	Sport	Event
Gold	Rosa Cámara; Dora Elia García; Juana Soto; Ángeles Valdez	Athletics	Women's − 4x60m relay 2-5
Gold	Alfredo Chávez	Archery	Men's − double FITA round novice paraplegic
Gold	Josefina Cornejo	Athletics	Women's − 60m 1A
Gold	Josefina Cornejo	Athletics	Women's − club throw 1A
Gold	Josefina Cornejo	Athletics	Women's − discus throw 1A
Gold	Josefina Cornejo	Athletics	Women's − shot put 1A
Gold	Francisco de las Fuentes	Athletics	Men's − 60m 1A
Gold	Francisco de las Fuentes; Arturo Granados; Eduardo Monsalvo; Pedro Sandoval	Athletics	Men's − 4x40 relay A-C
Gold	Eduardo Monsalvo	Athletics	Men's − 60m 1C
Gold	Martha Sandoval	Swimming	Women's − 25m backstroke 1B
Gold	Martha Sandoval	Swimming	Women's − 25m freestyle 1B
Gold	Martha Sandoval	Athletics	Women's − discus throw 1B
Gold	Pedro Sandoval	Athletics	Men's − discus throw 1C
Gold	Juana Soto	Athletics	Women's − 60m 5
Gold	Juana Soto	Athletics	Women's − 800m 5
Gold	Juana Soto	Athletics	Women's − 1500m 5
Gold	Ángeles Valdez	Athletics	Women's − 60m 3
Gold	Eusebio Valdez	Athletics	Men's − 100m 2
Gold	Eusebio Valdez	Athletics	Men's − 200m 2
Gold	Eusebio Valdez	Athletics	Men's − 400m 2
Silver	René Corona; Uriel Martínez; Rubén Rojas; Eusebio Valdez	Athletics	Men's − 4 × 100 m relay 2-5
Silver	Josefina Cornejo	Athletics	Women's − slalom 1A
Silver	Josefina Cornejo	Swimming	Women's − 25m backstroke 1A
Silver	Josefina Cornejo	Swimming	Women's − 25m freestyle 1A
Silver	Juan Cornejo	Athletics	Men's − slalom 1C
Silver	Francisco de las Fuentes	Athletics	Men's − club throw 1A
Silver	Francisco de las Fuentes	Athletics	Men's − slalom 1A
Silver	Henry Delgadallio	Swimming	Men's − 50m backstroke 3
Silver	Dora Elia García	Athletics	Women's − 60m 2
Silver	Arturo Granados	Athletics	Men's − 60m 1B
Silver	Martha Sandoval	Athletics	Women's − 60m 1B
Silver	Martha Sandoval	Athletics	Women's − club throw 1B
Silver	Martha Sandoval	Athletics	Women's − shot put 1B
Silver	Pedro Sandoval	Athletics	Men's − 60m 1C
Silver	Ángeles Valdez	Athletics	Women's − 200m 3
Silver	Ángeles Valdez	Athletics	Women's − 400m 3
Bronze	Antonio Castillo	Swimming	Men's − 100m backstroke 6
Bronze	Josefina Cornejo	Table tennis	Women's − singles 1A
Bronze	Uriel Martínez	Athletics	Men's − 800m 4
Bronze	G. M. Oviedo	Athletics	Men's − 200m 2
Bronze	Ana María Tenorio	Athletics	Women's − 800m 4
Bronze	Ana María Tenorio	Athletics	Women's − pentathlon 4

== See also ==
- 1980 Summer Paralympics
- Mexico at the 1980 Summer Olympics
