= Barbara Joscelyne =

British Paralympic athlete (born 1959)

Personal information
- Nationality: British
- Born: 9 May 1959 (age 67) Bishop's Stortford, England
Medal record
Athletics
Representing Great Britain
Paralympic Games
Gold medal – first place	1980 Arnhem	Women's 100m E
Gold medal – first place	1980 Arnhem	Women's 400m E
Gold medal – first place	1980 Arnhem	Women's long jump E
Gold medal – first place	1984 New York/Stoke Mandeville	Women's discus A6
Silver medal – second place	1984 New York/Stoke Mandeville	Women's 100m A6
Silver medal – second place	1984 New York/Stoke Mandeville	Women's shot put A6

Barbara Roach (née Joscelyne, born 9 May 1959) is a British Paralympian athlete. In the 1980 Summer Paralympics she won the gold medal in the E category 100m, 400 metres, and long jump. In 1984, competing in the A6 category, she won the gold medal in discus and a silver medal for the 100m and shot put.

She married Roy Roach in 1990 and went on to having three children: Katharine, Helen and Patrick.

She currently works at the Hertfordshire and Essex High School and Science College in Bishop's Stortford, Hertfordshire.
