= Yekutiel Gershoni =

Israeli paralympic athlete (1943–2021)

Olympic medal record

Athletics (Paralympics)
Silver medal – second place	1980 Arnhem	1,500m
Silver medal – second place	1980 Arnhem	400m
Silver medal – second place	1980 Arnhem	100m
Bronze medal – third place	1980 Arnhem	long jump
Bronze medal – third place	1984 New York	5,000m

Yekutiel Gershoni (Hebrew: יקותיאל גרשוני; 28 February 1943 – 14 July 2021) was an Israeli historian and paralympic champion.

Gershoni was born in Rishon LeZion, Mandatory Palestine, in 1943. He began his military service in the Israel Defense Forces in 1961, and became an officer in the Combat Engineering Corps. In November 1969, while a Captain in the Engineering Corps, he was severely injured while trying to dismantle a mine operated from a distance, which exploded, severely injuring him. His arms had to be amputated, and his vision and hearing were also severely impaired.

A year after his injury, Gershoni began studying Middle Eastern studies and African studies at Tel Aviv University. He completed with honors his two degrees and completed his PhD in 1982 from the Hebrew University of Jerusalem.

Gershoni developed an academic career despite facing challenges when writing his publications. During 2000–2004, he was head of the department for Middle Eastern and African studies at Tel Aviv University, in which he was promoted to the rank of professor in 1995. In 2001–2002, he was President of the International Association for Liberian Studies. Gershoni was also used as assistant researcher and lecturer at Stanford University, Boston University and Indiana University. He was awarded an honorary doctorate by Ben-Gurion University of the Negev in 2010.

Gershoni was active in disabled sports, competing at the 1980 and 1984 Paralympic Games in running and in long jump.

Gershoni was married and had three children. He died at the age of 78 on 14 July 2021.
