= Joe Harrison (athlete) =

Canadian Paralympic athlete (born 1954)

Personal information
- Full name: Joseph Harrison
- Nationality: Canadian
- Born: 6 August 1954 (age 71) Saskatoon, Saskatchewan

Sport
- Sport: Athletics
Medal record
Representing Canada
Paralympic Games
Athletics
Gold medal – first place	1976 Toronto	Men's 100 m D
Gold medal – first place	1980 Arnhem	Men's 400 m D
Silver medal – second place	1980 Arnhem	Men's 100 m D

Joseph Harrison (born 6 August 1954) is a Canadian Paralympic athlete.

Harrison was born in Saskatoon. He competed in the 1976 and 1980 Summer Paralympics. In the 1976 Paralympics, he won a gold medal in the men's 100 metres. In the 1980 Paralympics, he won a further gold and silver medal. He later competed in the 1992 and 1994 Winter Paralympics in biathlon and cross-country.
