= Kuwait at the 2000 Summer Paralympics =

- IPC code: KUW
- NPC: Kuwait Paralympic Committee

in Sydney
- Competitors: 26 (22 male, 4 female)
- Medals Ranked 57th: Gold 0 Silver 1 Bronze 4 Total 5

Summer Paralympics appearances (overview)
- 1980; 1984; 1988; 1992; 1996; 2000; 2004; 2008; 2012; 2016; 2020; 2024

There were 4 female and 22 male athletes representing the country at the 2000 Summer Paralympics.

== Medallists ==
Medal	Name	Sport	Event
Silver	Atef Al-Dousari	Athletics	Men's discus F53
Bronze	Hamad Aladwani	Athletics	Men's 100m T53
Bronze	Ahmad Makhseed	Athletics	Men's javelin F33
Bronze	Ahmad Makhseed	Athletics	Men's shot put F33
Bronze	Majed Al-Mutairi	Athletics	Men's shot put F58

== See also ==
- Kuwait at the 2000 Summer Olympics
- Kuwait at the Paralympics

== Bibliography ==
- International Paralympic Committee (2000). "Appendix C: Athlete Numbers - By Delegation". Sydney 2000 Paralympic Games Post Games Report. Sydney.
