= Denis Lapalme =

Canadian athlete and actor (1959–2021)

Personal information
- Full name: Denis Orval Lapalme
- Born: 29 April 1959 Timmins, Ontario, Canada
- Died: 1 November 2021 (aged 62)

Sport
- Country: Canada
- Sport: Paralympic athletics Paralympic swimming
- Disability class: C1
Medal record
Paralympic swimming
Representing Canada
Paralympic Games
Gold medal – first place	1980 Arnhem	100m backstroke C1-D1
Silver medal – second place	1976 Toronto	100m breaststroke C1
Silver medal – second place	1980 Arnhem	100m breaststroke C1
Bronze medal – third place	1976 Toronto	100m freestyle C1
Bronze medal – third place	1980 Arnhem	100m freestyle C1-C1
Paralympic athletics
Paralympic Games
Gold medal – first place	1980 Arnhem	100m C1
Gold medal – first place	1980 Arnhem	Javelin throw C1

Denis Orval Lapalme (April 29, 1959 – November 1, 2021) was a Canadian amputee athlete and actor, most noted as a competitor and medalist at the Paralympic Games.

Born in Timmins, Ontario, Lapalme lost both legs in a train accident in childhood. As an adult he was based principally in Ottawa, where he worked as a civil servant.

== Athletic career ==
He competed in swimming at the 1976 Summer Paralympics in Toronto, winning a bronze medal in the men's 100-metre freestyle and a silver in the men's 100-metre breaststroke.

At the 1980 Summer Paralympics in Arnhem, Netherlands, he competed in both track and swimming, winning gold medals in the men's 100-metre sprint, javelin and 100-meter backstroke, a silver medal in the 100-metre breaststroke, and a bronze medal in the 100-metre freestyle.

Lapalme competed on the men's wheelchair basketball team at both the 1988 Summer Paralympics in Seoul, South Korea and the 1992 Summer Paralympics in Barcelona, Spain. but the team did not medal at either event.

He also competed nationally and internationally in other track and wheelchair basketball competitions below the Paralympic level, including at the IWAS World Games in 1979.

Although no longer active as a Paralympic competitor after 1992, he remained involved in sports as late as the early 2010s as captain of the Ottawa Sledgehammers, the city's sledge hockey team. Lapalme died on November 1, 2021, in Hull, Quebec at the age of 62 of brain cancer.

== Acting ==
Following the end of his Paralympic career he was cast in his first acting role, as Jerome of Sandy Cove in Phil Comeau's 1994 film Jerome's Secret. He subsequently had small parts in the films Bleeders and Two Lovers and a Bear, and an episode of the television series F/X: The Series.
