= José Santos (athlete) =

Spanish Paralympic athlete

Personal information
- Full name: José Santos Poyatos
- Born: 26 March 1962 (age 64) Barcelona, Spain
Medal record
Men's para-athletics
Representing Spain
Paralympic Games
Silver medal – second place	1980 Arnhem	1500 m F
Silver medal – second place	1976 Toronto	100 m F
Bronze medal – third place	1976 Toronto	Long jump F

José Santos Poyatos (born 26 March 1962 in Barcelona) is a T41 track and field athlete from Spain. He competed at the 1976 Summer Paralympics, earning a silver in the 100 metre race and a bronze in the long jump.
