= Tony Harborn =

Swedish Paralympic athlete

Personal information
- Born: 26 August 1956 (age 69)

Sport
- Country: Sweden

Tony Harborn (born 26 August 1956) is a Swedish Paralympian who won two silver medals at the sixth Paralympic Games in Arnhem, Netherlands 1980, in the 80m CP C and 800 m CP C events and the silver in the 1000m Cross Country C6 event at the seventh Paralympic Games, New York, USA 1984. In recent years, Tony Harborn has served on the board of the County of Värmland Disabled Athletes Association and is currently employed as the statistician to IF Göta, Karlstad, Sweden.
