= Kuwait at the 1980 Summer Paralympics =

- IPC code: KUW
- NPC: Kuwait Paralympic Committee

in Arnhem
- Competitors: 9
- Medals Ranked 26th: Gold 2 Silver 2 Bronze 1 Total 5

Summer Paralympics appearances (overview)
- 1980; 1984; 1988; 1992; 1996; 2000; 2004; 2008; 2012; 2016; 2020; 2024

Kuwait competed at the 1980 Summer Paralympics in Arnhem, Netherlands. 9 competitors from Kuwait won 5 medals including 2 gold, 2 silver and 1 bronze and finished joint 26th in the medal table with South Korea.

== See also ==
- Kuwait at the Paralympics
- Kuwait at the 1980 Summer Olympics
