= Juana Soto =

Mexican Paralympic athlete

Medal record

Paralympic athletics

Representing Mexico

Paralympic Games
Gold medal – first place	1980 Arnhem	60 metres - 5
Gold medal – first place	1980 Arnhem	800 metres - 5
Gold medal – first place	1980 Arnhem	1500 metres - 5
Gold medal – first place	1980 Arnhem	4x60 metre relay - 2-5
Gold medal – first place	1984 Stoke Mandeville /New York	800 metres - 5
Gold medal – first place	1984 Stoke Mandeville /New York	800 metres - 5
Gold medal – first place	1988 Seoul	100 metres - 5-6
Gold medal – first place	1988 Seoul	400 metres - 5-6
Silver medal – second place	1984 Stoke Mandeville /New York	5000 metres - 5
Silver medal – second place	1988 Seoul	200 metres - 5-6
Silver medal – second place	1988 Seoul	4x200 metre relay - 2-6
Bronze medal – third place	1984 Stoke Mandeville /New York	1500 metres - 5
Bronze medal – third place	1984 Stoke Mandeville /New York	100 metres - 5
Bronze medal – third place	1992 Barcelona	4x100 metre relay - TW3-4

Juana Soto is a paralympic athlete from Mexico competing mainly in category TW4 sprint events.

== Biography ==
Juana competed at a total of 4 paralympics winning 14 medals, eight of them gold. Over her career she competed in a variety of events from 60m to marathon, pentathlon, shot put and javelin. Her first games were the 1980 Summer Paralympics held in Arnhem where, as well as competing in the shot put and slalom, she won gold in the 1500m in a new world record, 60m, 800m having taken 10 seconds of the world record set in the heats and was also part of the Mexican gold medal 4x60m relay team. Her second games in 1984 were not quite as successful as she competed in 200m, 400m,800m javelin and slalom as well as winning bronze in the 1500m and 100m, silver in the 5000m behind Canada's A Ieretti in a new world record and winning gold in the marathon ahead of her compatriot E Belmont and in the pentathlon. 1988 would see Juana restricted to four events however she won a medal in each of them finishing second in the 200m and in the 4 × 200 m behind a world record setting American quartet as well as breaking the paralympic games record to win gold in the 400m and setting a new world record on her way to winning the 100m. Her final games came in 1992 where she failed to make the final of the 100m, 200m and 400m but did win a final medal as part of the Mexican bronze medal-winning relay team.
