= Ian Trewhella =

Australian paralympic athlete (1945–2024)

Personal information
- Full name: Ian Anthony Trewhella
- Nationality: Australia
- Born: 20 May 1945
- Died: 29 November 2024 (aged 79) Canberra, Australian Capital Territory
Medal record
Para archery
Paralympic Games
Silver medal – second place	1980 Arnhem	Men's Short Metric Round Tetraplegic
Silver medal – second place	1984 New York/ Stoke Mandeville	Men's Double Advanced Metric Round Tetraplegic
Silver medal – second place	1984 New York/ Stoke Mandeville	Men's Short metric round team 1A–6
Para athletics
Paralympic Games
Silver medal – second place	1980 Arnhem	Men's Pentathlon 1B

Ian Anthony Trewhella, AM (20 May 1945 – 29 November 2024) was an Australian Paralympic medallist in athletics and archery, who won four medals at two Paralaympics.

== Background ==
In 1961, Trewhella became a quadriplegic due to an illness. He worked in the Australian Public Service for 27 years, 17 years of which was with the Department of Prime Minister and Cabinet. In 1984, he established the Wheelchair Factory in Canberra.

He was an advocate for people with a disability in Canberra and surrounding regions, having served on the boards and committees of many disability-related organisations. He provided advice to health professions and families on people living with quadriplegia.

In 1992, he became a Member of the Order of Australia due to volunteer service to people with disabilities in the fields of sport, recreation and welfare.

Trewhella died on 29 November 2024, at the age of 79.

== Paralympic Games ==
Trewhella used a variety of aids and strategies to hold the recurve bow and arrow. At the 1980 Arnhem Paralympics, he won silver medals in the Men's archery short metric round tetraplegic and men's athletics Pentathlon 1B events. At the 1984 New York/Stoke Mandeville Paralympics, he won two silver medals in archery in the Men's Double Advanced Metric Round Tetraplegic and Men's Short metric round team 1A–6 events.
