= Argentina at the 1980 Summer Paralympics =

- IPC code: ARG
- NPC: Argentine Paralympic Committee
- Website: www.coparg.org.ar

in Arnhem
- Competitors: 11
- Medals Ranked 24th: Gold 4 Silver 5 Bronze 6 Total 15

Summer Paralympics appearances (overview)
- 1960; 1964; 1968; 1972; 1976; 1980; 1984; 1988; 1992; 1996; 2000; 2004; 2008; 2012; 2016; 2020; 2024

Argentina competed at the 1980 Summer Paralympics in Arnhem, Netherlands. 11 competitors from Argentina won 15 medals including 4 gold, 5 silver and 6 bronze and finished 24th in the medal table.

== See also ==
- Argentina at the Paralympics
- Argentina at the 1980 Summer Olympics
