= Gary Collins-Simpson =

Canadian Paralympic swimmer

Personal information
- Born: November 1961 (age 64) Calgary, Alberta, Canada

Sport
- Country: Canada
- Sport: Swimming
Medal record
Athletics at the Summer Paralympics
Representing Canada
Paralympics
Gold medal – first place	1980 Arnhem	Men's 100m backstroke C-D
Gold medal – first place	1980 Arnhem	Men's 200m individual medley C
Silver medal – second place	1980 Arnhem	Men's 100m butterfly C

Gary Collins-Simpson (born November 1961) is a Canadian retired Paralympic swimmer. He competed at the 1980 Paralympics, winning three medals.

Collins-Simpson was born in Calgary, Alberta and raised in British Columbia and had his left leg amputated below the knee at the age of five after he was hit by a semi trailer while riding his bicycle. He later attended the University of British Columbia.
