= María Teresa Herreras López =

Spanish swimmer

Personal information
- Nationality: Spanish
- Born: Valladolid

Sport
- Country: Spain
- Sport: Swimming (S3)
Medal record
Swimming
Representing Spain
Paralympic Games

Maria Teresa Herreras Lopez (born in Valladolid) is a Class 3 swimmer from Spain. She competed at the 1976 Summer Paralympics, winning a pair of silver medals in two different swimming races and a pair of bronze medals in two swimming races.
