= Ann Farrell =

Canadian Paralympic athlete (born 1960/61)

Personal information
- Born: 1960 or 1961 (age 64–65) Botwood, Newfoundland, Canada

Sport
- Country: Canada
- Sport: Athletics
Medal record
Athletics at the Summer Paralympics
Representing Canada
Paralympics
Gold medal – first place	1980 Arnhem	Women's 100m C
Gold medal – first place	1980 Arnhem	Women's long jump C
Gold medal – first place	1980 Arnhem	Women's discus throw C
Gold medal – first place	1980 Arnhem	Women's javelin throw C
Gold medal – first place	1980 Arnhem	Women's shot put C
Gold medal – first place	1984 Stoke Mandeville / New York	Women's javelin throw A4
Bronze medal – third place	1984 Stoke Mandeville / New York	Women's 100m A4
Bronze medal – third place	1984 Stoke Mandeville / New York	Women's 400m A4

Ann Farrell (born 1960 or 1961) is a Canadian retired Paralympic athlete. She competed at the 1980 and 1984 Paralympics in Athletics. Farrell is an amputee, having lost her lower left leg in a train accident when she was four years old.
