= Giselle Cole =

Canadian Paralympic athlete

Personal information
- Nationality: Canadian
- Born: 1961 or 1962 (age 64–65)

Sport
- Country: Canada
- Sport: Athletics
Medal record
Athletics at the Summer Paralympics
Representing Canada
Paralympics
| Gold medal – first place | 1980 Arnhem | Women's 100m F1 |
| Gold medal – first place | 1980 Arnhem | Women's 400m F1 |
| Gold medal – first place | 1980 Arnhem | Women's long jump F1 |

Giselle Cole (born 1961 or 1962 in Trinidad and Tobago) is a Canadian retired Paralympic athlete. She competed at the 1980 Paralympics in Athletics. She was born with birth defects due to thalidomide.
