= Stefania Balta =

Polish-Canadian Paralympic athlete

Personal information
- Nationality: Canadian, Polish
- Born: 1954 or 1955 (age 71–72) Wrocław, Poland

Sport
- Country: Canada
- Sport: Athletics
Medal record
Athletics
Representing Canada
Paralympics
Gold medal – first place	1980 Arnhem	Women's discus throw D
Gold medal – first place	1980 Arnhem	Women's javelin throw D
Gold medal – first place	1980 Arnhem	Women's shot put D
Gold medal – first place	1980 Arnhem	Women's pentathlon D
Gold medal – first place	1984 Stoke Mandeville / New York	Women's discus throw A2
Gold medal – first place	1984 Stoke Mandeville / New York	Women's shot put A2
Bronze medal – third place	1984 Stoke Mandeville / New York	Women's javelin throw A2

Stefania Balta (born 1954 or 1955) is a Polish-Canadian retired Paralympic athlete. She competed at the 1980 and 1984 Paralympics in Athletics. An amputee since the age of nine after a farming accident, she previously competed for Poland before defecting to represent Canada in the 1976 Paralympics and onward. She lived in Toronto and operated a gas station.
