= Denmark at the 1980 Summer Paralympics =

- IPC code: DEN
- NPC: Paralympic Committee Denmark
- Website: www.paralympic.dk

in Arnhem
- Competitors: 42
- Medals Ranked 21st: Gold 6 Silver 4 Bronze 7 Total 17

Summer Paralympics appearances (overview)
- 1968; 1972; 1976; 1980; 1984; 1988; 1992; 1996; 2000; 2004; 2008; 2012; 2016; 2020; 2024

Denmark competed at the 1980 Summer Paralympics in Arnhem, Netherlands. 42 competitors from Denmark won 17 medals including 6 gold, 4 silver and 7 bronze and finished 21st in the medal table.

== See also ==
- Denmark at the Paralympics
- Denmark at the 1980 Summer Olympics
