= Norway at the 1980 Summer Paralympics =

Table of medalists

- IPC code: NOR
- NPC: Norwegian Olympic and Paralympic Committee and Confederation of Sports
- Website: www.idrett.no (in Norwegian)

in Arnhem
- Competitors: 53
- Medals Ranked 10th: Gold 15 Silver 13 Bronze 8 Total 36

Summer Paralympics appearances (overview)
- 1960; 1964; 1968; 1972; 1976; 1980; 1984; 1988; 1992; 1996; 2000; 2004; 2008; 2012; 2016; 2020; 2024

Norway competed at the 1980 Summer Paralympics in Arnhem, Netherlands. 53 competitors from Norway won 36 medals including 15 gold, 13 silver and 8 bronze and finished 10th in the medal table.

== Medalists ==
Medal	Name	Sport	Event
Gold	Marie Røsvik	Archery	Women's double FITA round amputee
Gold	Cato Zahl Pedersen	Athletics	Men's 100m E1
Gold	Cato Zahl Pedersen	Athletics	Men's 400m E1
Gold	Cato Zahl Pedersen	Athletics	Men's 1500m E1
Gold	Jarle Johnsen	Athletics	Men's long jump A
Gold	Cato Zahl Pedersen	Athletics	Men's long jump E1
Gold	Bjørn Tangen	Athletics	Men's discus throw CP D
Gold	Bjørn Tangen	Athletics	Men's javelin throw CP D
Gold	Kari Nilsen	Athletics	Women's discus throw 2
Gold	Kari Nilsen	Athletics	Women's javelin throw 2
Gold	Kåre Adler	Swimming	Men's 50m freestyle CP C
Gold	Erling Trondsen	Swimming	Men's 100m breaststroke C1
Gold	Erling Trondsen	Swimming	Men's 3x50m individual medley C1
Gold	Maj Britt Mastad	Swimming	Women's 3x50m individual medley D1
Gold	Åse Klausen; Marit Lysen	Table tennis	Women's teams 1B
Silver	Oddbjørn Stebekk	Archery	Men's double FITA round tetraplegic
Silver	Jørund Gåsemyr	Athletics	Men's 1500m A
Silver	Bjørn Tangen	Athletics	Men's shot put CP D
Silver	Men's team Tore Åsen	Dartchery	Men's pairs open
Silver	Kåre Adler	Swimming	Men's 50m breaststroke CP C
Silver	Tom Nordtvedt	Swimming	Men's 50m breaststroke J
Silver	Erling Trondsen	Swimming	Men's 100m backstroke C1-D1
Silver	Erling Trondsen	Swimming	Men's 100m freestyle C1-D1
Silver	Stig Osland	Swimming	Men's 100m freestyle CP D
Silver	Inger Martinsen	Swimming	Women's 100m breaststroke CP D
Silver	Maj Britt Mastad	Swimming	Women's 100m breaststroke D1
Silver	Inger Martinsen	Swimming	Women's 100m freestyle CP D
Silver	Marit Lysen	Table tennis	Women's singles 1B
Bronze	Svein Kristiansen	Archery	Men's short metric round tetraplegic
Bronze	Hans Anton Ålien	Athletics	Men's 1500m A
Bronze	Mixed team Oddbjørn Stebekk; Laila Hansen	Dartchery	Mixed pairs open
Bronze	Kåre Adler	Swimming	Men's 50m backstroke CP C
Bronze	Stig Osland	Swimming	Men's 100m breaststroke CP D
Bronze	Maj Britt Mastad	Swimming	Women's 100m backstroke C1-D1
Bronze	Vibeke Hagen	Swimming	Women's 100m breaststroke CP D
Bronze	Casper Caspersen; Jan Erik Stenberg	Table tennis	Men's teams 1A

== See also ==
- Norway at the Paralympics
- Norway at the 1980 Summer Olympics
