= France at the 1980 Summer Paralympics =

- IPC code: FRA
- NPC: French Paralympic and Sports Committee
- Website: france-paralympique.fr

in Arnhem
- Competitors: 97 in 8 sports
- Medals Ranked 8th: Gold 28 Silver 26 Bronze 31 Total 85

Summer Paralympics appearances (overview)
- 1960; 1964; 1968; 1972; 1976; 1980; 1984; 1988; 1992; 1996; 2000; 2004; 2008; 2012; 2016; 2020; 2024

France competed at the 1980 Summer Paralympics in Arnhem, Netherlands. 97 competitors from France won 85 medals including 28 gold, 26 silver and 31 bronze and finished 8th in the medal table.

== Medalists ==
Medal	Name	Sport	Event
Gold	J. M. Chapuis	Archery	Men's short metric round paraplegic
Gold	Andre Havard	Athletics	Men's 80m CP C
Gold	B. Pierre	Athletics	Men's long jump CP D
Gold	Onfroy	Athletics	Women's 60m CP C
Gold	D. Dosimont	Athletics	Women's 60m CP D
Gold	Onfroy	Athletics	Women's 400m CP C
Gold	D. Dosimont	Athletics	Women's 400m CP D
Gold	Onfroy	Athletics	Women's long jump CP C
Gold	D. Dosimont	Athletics	Women's long jump CP D
Gold	D. Dosimont	Athletics	Women's shot put CP D
Gold	Joel Guillon	Shooting	Men's air pistol amputee
Gold	B. Perry	Swimming	Men's 50m backstroke F1
Gold	B. Perry	Swimming	Men's 2x25m individual medley F1
Gold	M. H. Allard	Swimming	Women's 50m backstroke F
Gold	M. H. Allard	Swimming	Women's 3x50m individual medley F
Gold	Chorrihons	Weightlifting	Men's lightweight -65 kg amputee
Gold	Bernard Barberet	Weightlifting	Men's middleweight -75 kg amputee
Gold	Jean Grandsire	Weightlifting	Men's middleweight -75 kg paraplegic
Gold	Mohamed Benamar	Wheelchair fencing	Men's épée individual 1C-3
Gold	Christian Lachaud	Wheelchair fencing	Men's épée individual 4–5
Gold	Men's team	Wheelchair fencing	Men's épée team
Gold	Arthur Bellance	Wheelchair fencing	Men's foil individual 4–5
Gold	Men's team	Wheelchair fencing	Men's foil team
Gold	Christian Lachaud	Wheelchair fencing	Men's sabre individual 4–5
Gold	Jean-Claude Coralie; Andre Hennaert; Christian Lachaud; Aimé Planchon	Wheelchair fencing	Men's sabre team
Gold	Josette Bourgain	Wheelchair fencing	Women's foil individual 4–5
Gold	Josette Bourgain; Therese Lemoine; Monique Siclis	Wheelchair fencing	Women's foil team
Silver	Duvivier	Athletics	Men's 80m CP D
Silver	J. Alexandre	Athletics	Men's 1500m F
Silver	Leon Sur	Athletics	Men's javelin throw D
Silver	C. Petitot	Athletics	Women's 60m 4
Silver	Veronique Rochette	Athletics	Women's 400m CP C
Silver	Royet	Athletics	Women's 400m CP D
Silver	Veronique Rochette	Athletics	Women's long jump CP C
Silver	Royet	Athletics	Women's long jump CP D
Silver	Men's relay team	Swimming	Men's 3x50m freestyle relay E1-F1
Silver	Men's relay team	Swimming	Men's 3x100m medley relay CP D
Silver	M. H. Allard	Swimming	Women's 50m breaststroke F
Silver	M. H. Allard	Swimming	Women's 50m freestyle F
Silver	Isabelle Duranceau	Swimming	Women's 100m butterfly E
Silver	Isabelle Duranceau	Swimming	Women's 100m freestyle E
Silver	Isabelle Duranceau	Swimming	Women's 4x50m individual medley E
Silver	P. Chassagne	Swimming	Men's singles D
Silver	R. Andre; Maguy Ramousse	Table tennis	Women's teams 3
Silver	Joseph Ponnier	Weightlifting	Men's featherweight -57 kg paraplegic
Silver	B. Dersigneri	Weightlifting	Men's lightweight -65 kg amputee
Silver	J. Chauvel	Weightlifting	Men's light-heavyweight -85 kg amputee
Silver	N. Clemente	Weightlifting	Men's heavyweight +85 kg paraplegic
Silver	Andre Hennaert	Wheelchair fencing	Men's foil individual 2–3
Silver	Alain Siclis	Wheelchair fencing	Men's foil novice individual
Silver	Aimé Planchon	Wheelchair fencing	Men's sabre individual 4–5
Silver	Therese Lemoine	Wheelchair fencing	Women's foil individual 2–3
Silver	Monique Siclis	Wheelchair fencing	Women's foil individual 4–5
Bronze	G. Lafont	Archery	Men's double FITA round tetraplegic
Bronze	J. Thion	Archery	Men's short metric round paraplegic
Bronze	Marie-Francoise Hybois	Archery	Women's double FITA round amputee
Bronze	Duvivier	Athletics	Men's 800m CP D
Bronze	P. Morel	Athletics	Men's javelin throw 5
Bronze	Royet	Athletics	Women's 60m CP D
Bronze	Bernard Pique	Shooting	Mixed air rifle standing 2–5
Bronze	B. Perry	Swimming	Men's 50m breaststroke F1
Bronze	G. Betega	Swimming	Men's 100m breaststroke 5
Bronze	B. Jaillet	Swimming	Men's 100m breaststroke 6
Bronze	B. Jaillet	Swimming	Men's 100m butterfly 6
Bronze	T. Godineau	Swimming	Men's 100m freestyle 5
Bronze	David Foppolo	Swimming	Men's 2x25m individual medley F1
Bronze	Men's relay team	Swimming	Men's 4 × 100 m medley relay 1A-6
Bronze	Isabelle Duranceau	Swimming	Women's 100m backstroke E
Bronze	Isabelle Duranceau	Swimming	Women's 100m breaststroke E
Bronze	M. Crespeau	Swimming	Women's 4x50m individual medley 4
Bronze	Women's relay team	Swimming	Women's 3x100m medley relay CP D
Bronze	Daniel Jeannin	Table tennis	Men's singles 1C
Bronze	G. Caillon; Michel Peeters	Table tennis	Men's teams 2
Bronze	Andre Hennaert; Daniel Jeannin	Table tennis	Men's teams 3
Bronze	R. Andre	Table tennis	Women's singles 3
Bronze	N. Kabous	Table tennis	Women's singles C
Bronze	Jean-Michel Barberane	Weightlifting	Men's light-featherweight -51 kg paraplegic
Bronze	Gerard Houdmond	Weightlifting	Men's light-heavyweight -85 kg paraplegic
Bronze	J. L. Dury	Weightlifting	Men's heavyweight +85 kg amputee
Bronze	Arthur Bellance	Wheelchair fencing	Men's épée individual 4–5
Bronze	Mohamed Benamar	Wheelchair fencing	Men's foil individual 2–3
Bronze	Aimé Planchon	Wheelchair fencing	Men's foil individual 4–5
Bronze	Jean-Claude Coralie	Wheelchair fencing	Men's foil novice individual
Bronze	Jean-Pierre Leroux	Wheelchair fencing	Mixed foil individual 1C

== See also ==
- France at the Paralympics
- France at the 1980 Summer Olympics
