= Great Britain at the 1980 Summer Paralympics =

- Flag of the United Kingdom
- IPC code: GBR
- NPC: British Paralympic Association
- Website: www.paralympics.org.uk

in Arnhem
- Competitors: 96
- Medals Ranked 5th: Gold 47 Silver 32 Bronze 21 Total 100

Summer Paralympics appearances (overview)
- 1960; 1964; 1968; 1972; 1976; 1980; 1984; 1988; 1992; 1996; 2000; 2004; 2008; 2012; 2016; 2020; 2024

Great Britain competed at the 1980 Summer Paralympics Arnhem, Netherlands. It finished 5th in the overall medal count, with a total of 100 medals.

== Medallists ==
The following British competitors won medals at the Games. In the 'by discipline' sections below, medallists' names are in bold.

Medal	Name	Sport	Event	Date
Gold	William McLeod	Athletics	Men's 60m A	
Gold	Derek Howie	Athletics	Men's 5000m Walk B	
Gold	Philip Sadler	Athletics	Men's Javelin throw J	
Gold	Anthony Willis	Athletics	Men's Pentathlon D	
Gold	Barbara Joscelyne	Athletics	Women's 100 m E	
Gold	Barbara Joscelyne	Athletics	Women's 400 m E	
Gold	Barbara Joscelyne	Athletics	Women's Long jump E	
Gold	M. Goddard	Athletics	Women's Discus CP C	
Gold	Amanda Kyffin	Athletics	Women's Javelin CP D	
Gold	M. Price	Athletics	Women's Shot put 2	
Gold	M. Goddard	Athletics	Women's Shot put CP C	
Gold	M. Goddard	Athletics	Women's Javelin CP C	
Gold	D. Cale	Lawn bowls	Men's Singles 1A-1B	
Gold	Ken Bridgeman	Lawn bowls	Men's Singles 2-5	
Gold	William McLeod	Lawn bowls	Men's Singles A	
Gold	J. Hughes	Lawn bowls	Men's Singles B	
Gold	R. Newton	Lawn bowls	Men's Singles D	
Gold	D. Cale; Tommy Taylor	Lawn bowls	Men's Pairs 1A-1B	
Gold	Brian Faulkner; Ken Bridgeman	Lawn bowls	Men's Pairs 2-5	
Gold	J. Gladman; R. Newton	Lawn bowls	Men's Pairs D	
Gold	Maggie McLellan	Lawn bowls	Women's Singles 1A-1B	
Gold	K. Bonnet	Lawn bowls	Women's Singles A	
Gold	Jane Blackburn; Maggie McLellan	Lawn bowls	Women's Pairs 1A-1B	
Gold	Margaret Maughan; R. Thompson	Lawn bowls	Women's Pairs 2-5	
Gold	Mike Kenny	Swimming	Men's 25 m backstroke 1A	
Gold	Mike Kenny	Swimming	Men's 25 m breaststroke 1A	
Gold	Mike Kenny	Swimming	Men's 25 m freestyle 1A	
Gold	James Muirhead	Swimming	Men's 100 m backstroke A	
Gold	Peter Aldous	Swimming	Men's 100 m butterfly D	
Gold	James Muirhead	Swimming	Men's 100 m freestyle A	
Gold		Swimming	Men's 4 × 100 m medley relay C	
Gold	Isabel Barr	Swimming	Women's 25 m backstroke 1C	
Gold	Isabel Barr	Swimming	Women's 25 m breaststroke 1C	
Gold	Isabel Barr	Swimming	Women's 25 m freestyle 1C	
Gold	M. Price	Swimming	Women's 50 m backstroke 2	
Gold	M. Price	Swimming	Women's 50 m freestyle 2	
Gold	Monica Vaughan	Swimming	Women's 100 m breaststroke D	
Gold	Monica Vaughan	Swimming	Women's 100 m butterfly D	
Gold	Monica Vaughan	Swimming	Women's 100 m freestyle C-D	
Gold	M. Price	Swimming	Women's 3x25 m individual medley 2	
Gold	Monica Vaughan	Swimming	Women's 4x50 m individual medley D	
Gold		Swimming	Women's 4x50 m freestyle relay 2-6	
Gold	Tommy Taylor	Table tennis	Men's Singles 1B	
Gold	S. Bradshaw; Tommy Taylor	Table tennis	Men's Teams 1B	
Gold	Jane Blackburn	Table tennis	Women's Singles 1B	
Gold	A. Smith	Table tennis	Women's Singles 3	
Gold	M. Kelly	Fencing	Men's Sabre individual 2-3	
Silver	Valerie Williamson	Archery	Women's Short metric round paraplegic	
Silver	John Buchanan; Alan Corrie; Ian Smith	Archery	Men's Double FITA round team paraplegic	
Silver	Anthony Willis	Athletics	Men's High jump D	
Silver	Philip Sadler	Athletics	Men's Discus throw J	
Silver	S. Gregg	Athletics	Men's Shot put D	
Silver	Philip Sadler	Athletics	Men's Shot put J	
Silver	Barbara Howie	Athletics	Women's 60 m 3	
Silver	M. Price	Athletics	Women's Discus 2	
Silver	R. Miller	Lawn bowls	Men's Singles C	
Silver	J. Gladman	Lawn bowls	Men's Singles D	
Silver	Michael Byrne	Lawn bowls	Men's Singles F	
Silver	R. Miller; Neil Shaw	Lawn bowls	Men's Pairs C	
Silver	Jane Blackburn	Lawn bowls	Women's Singles 1A-1B	
Silver	Yvonne Hawtin	Lawn bowls	Women's Singles 2-5	
Silver	Yvonne Hawtin; G. Matthews	Lawn bowls	Women's Pairs 2-5	
Silver	Chris Hampshire	Swimming	Men's 100 m backstroke CP D	
Silver	James Muirhead	Swimming	Men's 100 m butterfly A	
Silver	James Muirhead	Swimming	Men's 4 × 100 m individual medley A	
Silver		Swimming	4 × 100 m freestyle relay C-D	
Silver	L. Wilkinson	Swimming	Women's 50 m butterfly 5	
Silver	Monica Vaughan	Swimming	Women's 100 m backstroke C-D	
Silver	Lorraine Robinson	Swimming	Women's 100 m breaststroke A	
Silver	L. Wilkinson	Swimming	Women's 100 m freestyle 5	
Silver	D. Smith	Swimming	Women's 4x25 m individual medley 3	
Silver		Swimming	Women's 3x50 m medley relay 2-4	
Silver	J. Swann	Table tennis	Women's Singles 3	
Silver	Jane Blackburn; G. Matthews	Table tennis	Women's Teams 2	
Silver	B. Gibbs; J. Swann	Table tennis	Women's Teams 4	
Silver	T. Willet	Fencing	Men's Épée individual 1C-3	
Silver		Fencing	Men's Épée team	
Silver	T. Willet	Fencing	Men's Sabre individual 2-3	
Silver	M. Kelly; Tom Killin; H. Wardle; T. Willet	Fencing	Men's Sabre team	
Bronze	John Buchanan	Archery	Men's Double FITA round paraplegic	
Bronze	G. Matthews	Archery	Women's Advanced metric round paraplegic	
Bronze	S. Gregg	Athletics	Men's Discus D	
Bronze	Maggie McLellan	Athletics	Women's 60m 1A	
Bronze	M. Price	Athletics	Women's Javelin 2	
Bronze	Amanda Kyffin	Athletics	Women's Shot put CP D	
Bronze		Dartchery	Women's pairs open	
Bronze	Tommy Taylor	Lawn bowls	Men's Singles 1A-1B	
Bronze	P. Silva	Lawn bowls	Men's Singles 2-5	
Bronze		Lawn bowls	Men's Pairs 2-5	
Bronze	Neil Shaw	Lawn bowls	Men's Singles C	
Bronze	R. Thompson	Lawn bowls	Women's Singles 2-5	
Bronze	M. Price	Swimming	Women's 50 m breaststroke 2	
Bronze	D. Smith	Swimming	Women's 50 m freestyle 3	
Bronze	L. Wilkinson	Swimming	Women's 100 m backstroke 5	
Bronze	Jenny Orpwood	Swimming	Women's 100 m breaststroke 4	
Bronze	L. Wilkinson	Swimming	Women's 100 m breaststroke 5	
Bronze	J. Tree	Swimming	Women's 100 m breaststroke B	
Bronze	L. Wilkinson	Swimming	Women's 4x50 m individual medley 5	
Bronze		Fencing	Men's Foil team	
Bronze	Maggie McLellan	Fencing	Mixed Foil individual 1A	

=== Medals by sport ===
Medals by sport
**Sport**	Gold medal	Silver medal	Bronze medal	Total
Swimming	18	10	7	35
Lawn Bowls	12	7	5	24
Athletics	12	6	4	22
Table tennis	4	3	0	7
Wheelchair Fencing	1	4	2	7
Archery	0	2	2	4
Dartchery	0	0	1	1
Total	47	32	21	100

== See also ==
- 1980 Summer Paralympics
- Great Britain at the 1980 Summer Olympics
