= Japan at the 1980 Summer Paralympics =

- IPC code: JPN
- NPC: Japan Paralympic Committee
- Website: www.jsad.or.jp (in Japanese)

in Arnhem
- Competitors: 30
- Medals Ranked 16th: Gold 9 Silver 10 Bronze 7 Total 26

Summer Paralympics appearances (overview)
- 1964; 1968; 1972; 1976; 1980; 1984; 1988; 1992; 1996; 2000; 2004; 2008; 2012; 2016; 2020; 2024

Japan competed at the 1980 Summer Paralympics in Arnhem, Netherlands. 30 competitors from Japan won 26 medals including 9 gold, 10 silver and 7 bronze and finished 16th in the medal table.

== See also ==
- Japan at the Paralympics
