= New Zealand at the 1980 Summer Paralympics =

- IPC code: NZL
- NPC: Paralympics New Zealand
- Website: paralympics.org.nz

in Arnhem
- Medals: Gold 7 Silver 6 Bronze 7 Total 20

Summer Paralympics appearances (overview)
- 1968; 1972; 1976; 1980; 1984; 1988; 1992; 1996; 2000; 2004; 2008; 2012; 2016; 2020; 2024

New Zealand won 20 medals at the 1980 Summer Paralympics: 7 golds, 6 silver and 7 bronze medals.

== See also ==
- New Zealand at the Paralympics
