= Switzerland at the 1980 Summer Paralympics =

- IPC code: SUI
- NPC: Swiss Paralympic Committee
- Website: www.swissparalympic.ch

in Arnhem
- Competitors: 65
- Medals Ranked 15th: Gold 9 Silver 10 Bronze 10 Total 29

Summer Paralympics appearances (overview)
- 1960; 1964; 1968; 1972; 1976; 1980; 1984; 1988; 1992; 1996; 2000; 2004; 2008; 2012; 2016; 2020; 2024

Switzerland competed at the 1980 Summer Paralympics in Arnhem, Netherlands. 65 competitors from Switzerland won 29 medals including 9 gold, 10 silver and 10 bronze and finished 15th in the medal table.

== See also ==
- Switzerland at the Paralympics
- Switzerland at the 1980 Summer Olympics
