= Netherlands at the 1980 Summer Paralympics =

- Flag of the Netherlands
- IPC code: NED (HOL used at these Games)
- NPC: Nederlands Olympisch Comité * Nederlandse Sport Federatie
- Website: paralympisch.nl (in Dutch)

in Arnhem
- Competitors: 108 (78 men, 26 women & 4 mixed)
- Medals Ranked 6th: Gold 33 Silver 31 Bronze 36 Total 100

Summer Paralympics appearances (overview)
- 1960; 1964; 1968; 1972; 1976; 1980; 1984; 1988; 1992; 1996; 2000; 2004; 2008; 2012; 2016; 2020; 2024

Netherlands competed at the 1980 Summer Paralympics in Arnhem, Netherlands. The team included 108 athletes, 78 men, 26 women & 4 mixed (Unknown gender, participant of a mixed gender event). Competitors from Netherlands won 100 medals, including 33 gold, 31 silver and 36 bronze to finish 6th in the medal table.

== See also ==
- Netherlands at the Paralympics
- Netherlands at the 1980 Summer Olympics
