= Poland at the 1980 Summer Paralympics =

- IPC code: POL
- NPC: Polish Paralympic Committee
- Website: www.paralympic.org.pl

in Arnhem
- Competitors: 80
- Medals Ranked 2nd: Gold 75 Silver 50 Bronze 52 Total 177

Summer Paralympics appearances (overview)
- 1972; 1976; 1980; 1984; 1988; 1992; 1996; 2000; 2004; 2008; 2012; 2016; 2020; 2024

Poland competed at the 1980 Summer Paralympics in Arnhem, Netherlands. 80 competitors from Poland won 177 medals including 75 gold, 50 silver and 52 bronze and finished 2nd in the medal table.

== See also ==
- Poland at the Paralympics
- Poland at the 1980 Summer Olympics
