= Austria at the 1980 Summer Paralympics =

- IPC code: AUT
- NPC: Austrian Paralympic Committee
- Website: www.oepc.at (in German)

in Arnhem
- Competitors: 48
- Medals Ranked 11th: Gold 14 Silver 23 Bronze 8 Total 45

Summer Paralympics appearances (overview)
- 1960; 1964; 1968; 1972; 1976; 1980; 1984; 1988; 1992; 1996; 2000; 2004; 2008; 2012; 2016; 2020; 2024

Austria competed at the 1980 Summer Paralympics in Arnhem, Netherlands. 48 competitors from Austria won 45 medals including 14 gold, 23 silver and 8 bronze and finished 11th in the medal table.

== See also ==
- Austria at the Paralympics
- Austria at the 1980 Summer Olympics
