= Finland at the 1980 Summer Paralympics =

- IPC code: FIN
- NPC: Finnish Paralympic Committee
- Website: www.paralympia.fi/en

in Arnhem
- Competitors: 60
- Medals Ranked 17th: Gold 8 Silver 19 Bronze 13 Total 40

Summer Paralympics appearances (overview)
- 1960; 1964; 1968; 1972; 1976; 1980; 1984; 1988; 1992; 1996; 2000; 2004; 2008; 2012; 2016; 2020; 2024

Finland competed at the 1980 Summer Paralympics in Arnhem, Netherlands. 60 competitors from Finland won 40 medals including 8 gold, 19 silver and 13 bronze and finished 17th in the medal table.

== See also ==
- Finland at the Paralympics
- Finland at the 1980 Summer Olympics
