= West Germany at the 1980 Summer Paralympics =

- Flag of Germany
- IPC code: FRG
- NPC: National Paralympic Committee Germany
- Website: www.dbs-npc.de (in German)

in Arnhem
- Competitors: 129
- Medals Ranked 3rd: Gold 68 Silver 48 Bronze 46 Total 162

Summer Paralympics appearances (overview)
- 1960; 1964; 1968; 1972; 1976; 1980; 1984; 1988; 1992; 1996; 2000; 2004; 2008; 2012; 2016; 2020; 2024

Other related appearances
- East Germany (1984)

West Germany competed at the 1980 Summer Paralympics in Arnhem, Netherlands. 129 competitors from West Germany won 162 medals including 68 gold, 48 silver and 46 bronze and finished 3rd in the medal table.

== See also ==
- West Germany at the Paralympics
