= Sweden at the 1980 Summer Paralympics =

- IPC code: SWE
- NPC: Swedish Parasports Federation

in Arnhem
- Competitors: 94
- Medals Ranked 7th: Gold 31 Silver 36 Bronze 24 Total 91

Summer Paralympics appearances (overview)
- 1960; 1964; 1968; 1972; 1976; 1980; 1984; 1988; 1992; 1996; 2000; 2004; 2008; 2012; 2016; 2020; 2024

Sweden competed at the 1980 Summer Paralympics in Arnhem, Netherlands. 94 competitors from Sweden won 91 medals including 31 gold, 36 silver and 24 bronze and finished 7th in the medal table.

== See also ==
- Sweden at the Paralympics
- Sweden at the 1980 Summer Olympics
