= 1980 Summer Paralympics =

Multi-parasport event in Arnhem, Netherlands

VI Paralympic Games
- Location: Arnhem, Netherlands
- Nations: 43
- Athletes: 1,973
- Events: 489 in 13 sports
- Opening: 21 June 1980
- Closing: 30 June 1980
- Opened by: Princess Margriet
- Stadium: National Sports Centre Papendal

The 1980 Summer Paralympics (Dutch: Paralympische Zomerspelen 1980), branded as the Olympics for the Disabled, were the sixth Summer Paralympic Games. They were held in Arnhem, Netherlands, from 21 to 30 June 1980.

== Background ==
The Soviet Union, hosts of the 1980 Summer Olympics, were invited to host these Paralympics. However, Ludwig Guttmann reported in 1977, that he received no responses to his efforts to get the USSR to host these Paralympics. There are the claims that a statement was issued denying the existence of any disabled people in the country, or that a Soviet official joked "We have no disabled in the USSR". These claims are disputed and have been described as "Paralympic folklore". Soviet Paralympic teams were first represented in the 1988 Summer and Winter Games, also the last while the Soviet Union was extant. The first Paralympics on former Soviet territory would be in 2014.

There was controversy during the preparation for these Games over the inclusion of a team from South Africa. In the Netherlands, public and official opinion was against the inclusion of the South African team and pressure came from a number of sports organisations against the Organising Committee. The Dutch Parliament was negative as well. Eventually, the parliament decided against allowing the participation of the South African team. Although "much of the publicity relating to the South African participation had been negative, it did succeed in bringing the disabled sports movement into the minds of many people who would not have otherwise considered the subject at all. Dutch organisers also increased visibility through their fundraising ... building a fund that would hold a surplus years after the games. This would naturally find its expression in the International Fund Sport Disabled, supporting the future of the paralympic movement in the 1980s."

== Mascots ==
The 1980 Paralympics were the first ever to have mascots: a pair of squirrels, Noggi and Joggi, designed by Necky Oprinsen from Sint-Michielsgestel. They were chosen through a design competition by Dutch broadcaster AVRO.

== Sports ==
Competitors were divided into four disability categories: amputee, cerebral palsy, visually impaired, and wheelchair. It was the first time that cerebral palsy athletes competed in the Paralympics. Volleyball was added to the program as a new sport.

- Archery
- Athletics
- Dartchery
- Goalball
- Lawn bowls
- Shooting
- Swimming
- Table tennis
- Volleyball
- Weightlifting
- Wheelchair basketball
- Wheelchair fencing
- Wrestling

== Participating delegations ==
Forty-three delegations took part in the Arnhem Paralympics. Iceland, Kuwait and Sudan made their first appearances.

Prior to the Games, the States General (national Parliament) of the Netherlands, as host country, adopted a motion declaring South Africa's participation "undesirable", due to its policy of apartheid. The 1980 Games thus marked South Africa's first absence from the Summer Paralympics since it had joined the movement in 1964, and it remained absent until 1992. The Netherlands' decision thus corrected the anomaly whereby South Africa had been banned from the Olympic movement since 1960, while still being authorised to take part in the Paralympic Games.

- Argentina (11)
- Australia (52)
- Austria (48)
- Bahamas (6)
- Belgium (67)
- Brazil (2)
- Canada (94)
- Colombia (11)
- Czechoslovakia (7)
- Denmark (42)
- Egypt (33)
- Ethiopia (1)
- Finland (60)
- France (97)
- Great Britain (96)
- Greece (7)
- Hong Kong (11)
- Iceland (12)
- Indonesia (15)
- Ireland (23)
- Israel (47)
- Italy (38)
- Jamaica (13)
- Japan (30)
- Kenya (17)
- Kuwait (9)
- Luxembourg (9)
- Malta (8)
- Mexico (27)
- Netherlands (108)
- New Zealand (17)
- Norway (53)
- Poland (80)
- South Korea (12)
- Spain (24)
- Sudan (11)
- Sweden (94)
- Switzerland (65)
- United States (132)
- West Germany (128)
- Yugoslavia (31)
- Zimbabwe (5)

== Medal table ==
The top 10 NPCs by number of gold medals are listed below. The host nation, Netherlands, is highlighted.

Rank	Nation	Gold	Silver	Bronze	Total
1	United States	75	66	54	195
2	Poland	75	50	52	177
3	West Germany	68	48	46	162
4	Canada	64	35	31	130
5	Great Britain	47	32	21	100
6	Netherlands*	33	31	36	100
7	Sweden	31	36	24	91
8	France	28	26	31	85
9	Mexico	20	16	6	42
10	Norway	15	13	8	36
Totals (10 entries)		456	353	309	1,118

== See also ==
- 1980 Summer Olympics
- 1980 Winter Paralympics

Preceded by Toronto	Summer Paralympics; Arnhem; VI Paralympic Summer Games (1980)	Succeeded by New York–Stoke Mandeville
