= List of Paralympic medalists in shooting =

Shooting became a medal sport in the 1976 Summer Paralympics in Toronto, Canada having previously been a demonstration sport at the International Stoke Mandeville Games. It started off with only three mixed air rifle events (class 1A-1C, class 2-5 and amputees). Canada led the medal table with two golds and one silver while Israel at the Paralympics won one silver and two bronzes.

In the 1980 Summer Paralympics, there were eleven events which included men's and women's air pistol events for amputees debuted. Mixed events included air rifle events with 3-position, kneeling, prone and standing for three classes. The 1984 Summer Paralympics expanded the number of events to 29 events which featured, for the first time, men's team events for 3-position, standing, kneeling and prone, Netherlands won two of the events (3-positions and kneeling), won a silver medal in the prone team and a bronze in the standing team. In the individual events, Australia reigned the sport contest by winning nine gold medals (eight in the women's events by Libby Kosmala and Barbara Caspers who both won four golds each and Allan Chadwick won the men's rifle-prone tetraplegic event). Shooting at the 1988 Summer Paralympics in Seoul, saw three competitors tied for bronze medals which meant there were 25 bronze medals awarded instead of 23. Within the past twelve years, Jonas Jacobsson earned most of his medals within this decade by winning three golds, three silvers and five bronze medals.

The 1992 Summer Paralympics saw the number of events dropped to 16 events as they were back to being mixed events and Germany won the most gold medals by winning five: Johann Brunner won the most medals for his team (one gold and three silvers). In 1996 Atlanta, Thomas Jacobsson won three gold medals and Jonas Jacobsson earned two golds and one bronze for Sweden.

The classes changed to two in the 2000 Summer Paralympics in Sydney: SH1 was for competitors (pistol and rifle) didn't require a standing post and SH2 for competitors who have upper limb disability who need the use of a standing post when competing. Franc Pinter was the first Slovenian shooter to win medals by winning three silver medals between 2000 and 2008. In 2012, Jonas Jacobsson got only two medals: he won gold for 50m rifle 3-positions SH1 and silver in 10m rifle standing SH1 and he earned himself to be one of the best performing male Paralympians to have won the most medals (17 golds, 4 silvers and 9 bronzes).

== Medalists ==
=== Men's events ===
==== Pistol ====
Class	Year	Gold	Silver	Bronze
Air pistol amputee	1980	Joel Guillon; France	Laszlo Decsi; Canada	Dick Munter; Netherlands
Air pistol 1A-1C	1984	Siegmar Henker; West Germany	Gregor Bonderud; Sweden	West Brownlow; United States
Air pistol 2–6	1984	Oskar Kreuzer; Austria	Ernst Eriksen; Denmark	Aulis Rinne; Finland
Air pistol 2–6	1988	Gabriele Celegato; Italy	Hubert Aufschnaiter; Austria	Aulis Rinne; Finland
Air pistol integrated	1984	Simo Kecman; Yugoslavia	Joel Guillon; France	Guy Dunarquez; France
Air pistol sitting LSH1	1988	Jae Hwan Baek; South Korea	Jung Don Lee; South Korea	Freed Hazewinkel; Netherlands
Air pistol standing LSH2	1988	Young Soo Kang; South Korea	Guy Dumarquez; France	Jan van den Meerendonk; Netherlands
Air pistol SH1	1992	Branimir Jovanovski; Independent Paralympic Participants	Radomir Rakonjac; Independent Paralympic Participants	Young Soo Kang; South Korea
Air pistol SH1	1996	Andrey Lebedinsky; Russia	Hubert Aufschnaiter; Austria	Antonio Martella; Italy
Air pistol SH1	2000	Hee Jeong Lee; South Korea	Li Jianfei; China	Hubert Aufschnaiter; Austria
Air pistol SH1	2004	Li Jianfei; China	Vanco Karanfilov; Macedonia	Hubert Aufschnaiter; Austria
Air pistol SH1	2008	Valeriy Ponomarenko; Russia	Sergey Malyshev; Russia	Lee Ju-Hee; South Korea
Air pistol SH1	2012	Park Sea-Kyun; South Korea	Muharrem Korhan Yamac; Turkey	Lee Ju-Hee; South Korea
Air pistol SH1	2016	Yang Chao; China	Lee Ju-Hee; South Korea	Server Ibragimov; Uzbekistan
Air pistol SH1	2020	Yang Chao; China	Huang Xing; China	Singhraj Adhana; India
Air pistol SH1	2024	Jo Jeong-du; South Korea	Manish Narwal; India	Yang Chao; China
Air pistol SH2	1992	Pierre Guivarch; France	Jae Hwan Paik; South Korea	Philippe Michoux; France

==== Rifle ====
Class	Year	Gold	Silver	Bronze
Rifle 2 positions 1A-1C	1988	Santo Mangano; Italy	Mario Dorigo; Belgium	Adam Salamandyk; Canada
Rifle 3 positions 1A-6	1984	Eef Tammel; Netherlands	Franz Falke; West Germany	Jonas Jacobsson; Sweden
Rifle 3 positions 2–6	1988	Anders Lundvall; Sweden	Franz Falke; West Germany	Serge Pittard; France; Eef Tammel; Netherlands; Wolfgang Hess; West Germany
Rifle integrated	1984	Antti Landstedt; Finland	Doron Asher; Israel	Nissim Filosof; Israel
Rifle kneeling 1A-1C	1984	Peter Haslam; Great Britain	Jan Kristensen; Denmark	West Brownlow; United States
Rifle kneeling 1A-1C	1988	Santo Mangano; Italy	Mario Dorigo; Belgium	Adam Salamandyk; Canada
Rifle kneeling 2–6	1984	Eef Tammel; Netherlands	Michel Pelon; France	Franz Falke; West Germany
Rifle kneeling 2–6	1988	Jung Hun Song; South Korea	Franz Falke; West Germany	Byung Joon Yu; South Korea
Rifle prone 1A-1C	1984	Siegmar Henker; West Germany	Peter Haslam; Great Britain	Jan Kristensen; Denmark
Rifle prone 1A-1C	1988	Santo Mangano; Italy	Mario Dorigo; Belgium	Adam Salamandyk; Canada
Rifle prone 2–6	1984	Roger Withrow; United States	Michel Pelon; France	Eef Tammel; Netherlands
Rifle standing 1A-1C	1984	Siegmar Henker; West Germany	Jan Kristensen; Denmark	Peter Haslam; Great Britain
Rifle standing 2–6	1984	Eef Tammel; Netherlands	Jonas Jacobsson; Sweden	Franz Falke; West Germany
Rifle standing 2–6	1988	Wolfgang Hess; West Germany	Eef Tammel; Netherlands	Anders Lundvall; Sweden
Rifle prone tetraplegic 1A-1C	1984	Allan Chadwick; Australia	Andre Chevrier; Switzerland	Kuno Stieger; Switzerland
Rifle sitting LSH1	1988	Kyu Hyun Bae; South Korea	Keith Morriss; Great Britain	Kusti Korkeasalo; Finland
Rifle standing LSH2	1988	Jin Dong Jung; South Korea	Doron Asher; Israel	Reino Landstedt; Finland
Rifle standing SH1	1992	Aloys Schneider; Germany	Jin Dong Jung; South Korea	Robert Cooper; Great Britain
Rifle standing SH1	1996	Tae Ho Han; South Korea	Franc Pinter; Slovenia	Franz Falke; Germany
Rifle standing SH1	2000	Jin Owan Jung; South Korea	Franc Pinter; Slovenia	Jonas Jacobsson; Sweden
Rifle standing SH1	2004	Jonas Jacobsson; Sweden	Franc Pinter; Slovenia	Ashley Adams; Australia
Rifle standing SH1	2008	Jonas Jacobsson; Sweden	Norbert Gau; Germany	Franc Pinter; Slovenia
Rifle standing SH1	2012	Dong Chao; China	Jonas Jacobsson; Sweden	Josef Neumaier; Germany
Rifle standing SH1	2016	Dong Chao; China	Abdullah Sultan Alaryani; United Arab Emirates	Kim Su Wan; South Korea
Rifle standing SH1	2020	Dong Chao; China	Andrii Doroshenko; Ukraine	Park Jin-ho; South Korea
Rifle standing SH2	1992	Jonas Jacobsson; Sweden	Johann Brunner; Germany	Serge Pittard; France
Rifle 3 positions SH1	1996	Jonas Jacobsson; Sweden	Josef Neumaier; Germany	Alfred Berniger; Germany
Rifle 3 positions SH1	2008	Jonas Jacobsson; Sweden	Doron Shaziri; Israel	Dong Chao; China
Rifle 3 positions SH1	2012	Jonas Jacobsson; Sweden	Doron Shaziri; Israel	Dong Chao; China
Rifle 3 positions SH1	2016	Laslo Šuranji; Serbia	Abdullah Sultan Alaryani; United Arab Emirates	Doron Shaziri; Israel
Rifle 3 positions SH1	2020	Abdullah Sultan Alaryani; United Arab Emirates	Laslo Šuranji; Serbia	Shim Young-jip; South Korea
Free rifle 3 positions SH1	1996	Josef Neumaier; Germany	Doron Shaziri; Israel	Bjorn Samuelsson; Sweden
Free rifle 3 positions SH1	2000	Jonas Jacobsson; Sweden	Josef Neumaier; Germany	Jin Owan Jung; South Korea
Free rifle 3 positions SH1	2004	Jonas Jacobsson; Sweden	Dan Jordan; United States	Doron Shaziri; Israel

=== Women's events ===
==== Pistol ====
Event	Year	Gold	Silver	Bronze
Air pistol amputee	1980	Marianne Ruml; Austria	None	None
Air pistol 1A-1C	1984	Isabel Barr; Great Britain	None	None
Air pistol 2–6	1984	Nicolle Sarton; France	Marie Chantal Barberaud; France	None
Air pistol 2–6	1988	Zhang Wei; China	Heather Kuttai; Canada	Isabel Barr; Great Britain
Air pistol integrated	1984	Brigit Larsen; Denmark	Sonja Vettenburg; Belgium	Marie Therese Pichon; France
Air pistol standing LSH2	1988	Sonja Vettenburg; Belgium	Ruzica Aleksov; Yugoslavia	Marie Therese Pichon; France
Air pistol SH1	1996	Ruzica Aleksov; Yugoslavia	Lone Overbye; Denmark	Rosabelle Riese; South Africa
Air pistol SH1	2000	Isabel Newstead; Great Britain	Lin Haiyan; China	Nayyereh Akef; Iran
Air pistol SH1	2004	Isabel Newstead; Great Britain	Chin Mei Lin; Chinese Taipei	Yelena Taranova; Azerbaijan
Air pistol SH1	2008	Lin Haiyan; China	Moon Aee-Kyung; South Korea	Natalia Dalekova; Russia
Air pistol SH1	2012	Olivera Nakovska-Bikova; Macedonia	Marina Klimenchenko; Russia	Sareh Javanmardi; Iran
Air pistol SH1	2016	Sareh Javanmardi; Iran	Olga Kovalchuk; Ukraine	Aysegul Pehlivanlar; Turkey
Air pistol SH1	2020	Sareh Javanmardi; Iran	Aysegul Pehlivanlar; Turkey	Krisztina Dávid; Hungary

==== Rifle ====
Class	Year	Gold	Silver	Bronze
Rifle 3 positions 1A-6	1984	Libby Kosmala; Australia	Nicole Petit; France	Deanna Coates; Great Britain
Rifle 3 positions 1A-6	1988	Libby Kosmala; Australia	Merita Pedersen; Denmark	Loraine Schulz; West Germany
Rifle integrated	1984	Annie Lecointe; France	Anne Picot; Great Britain	Alison Smith; New Zealand
Rifle kneeling 1A-1C	1984	Barbara Caspers; Australia	None	None
Rifle kneeling 2–6	1984	Libby Kosmala; Australia	Deanna Coates; Great Britain	Siegfried Battran; West Germany
Rifle kneeling 2–6	1988	Libby Kosmala; Australia	Ruth Keidar; Israel	Shui Mai Leung; Hong Kong
Rifle prone 1A-1C	1984	Barbara Caspers; Australia	None	None
Rifle prone 2–6	1984	Libby Kosmala; Australia	Nicole Petit; France	Siegfried Battran; West Germany
Rifle prone 2–6	1988	Libby Kosmala; Australia	Rita Pieri; Italy	Gill Middleton; Great Britain
Rifle standing 1A-1C	1984	Barbara Caspers; Australia	None	None
Rifle standing 2–6	1984	Libby Kosmala; Australia	Deanna Coates; Great Britain	Nicole Petit; France
Rifle standing 2–6	1988	Deanna Coates; Great Britain	Libby Kosmala; Australia	Gill Middleton; Great Britain
Rifle 3 positions SH1	1996	Kim Im-Yeon; South Korea	Deanna Coates; Great Britain	Sabine Brogle; Germany
Rifle 3 positions SH1	2000	Kim Im-Yeon; South Korea	Sabine Brogle; Germany	Nicole Michoux; France
Rifle 3 positions SH1	2004	Her Myung-Sook; South Korea	Kim Im-Yeon; South Korea	Manuela Schmermund; Germany
Rifle 3 positions SH1	2008	Lee Yun-Ri; South Korea	Kim In-Yeon; South Korea	Zhang Cuiping; China
Rifle 3 positions SH1	2012	Zhang Cuiping; China	Dang Shibei; China	Veronika Vadovicova; Slovakia
Rifle 3 positions SH1	2016	Zhang Cuiping; China	Veronika Vadovicova; Slovakia	Lee Yun-Ri; South Korea
Rifle 3 positions SH1	2020	Zhang Cuiping; China	Natascha Hiltrop; Germany	Avani Lekhara; India
Standard rifle 3 positions SH1	1996	Im Yeon Kim; South Korea	Michele Amiel; France	Sabine Brogle; Germany
Rifle standing SH1	1996	Deanna Coates; Great Britain	Zhang Nan; China	Im Yeon Kim; South Korea
Rifle standing SH1	2000	Im Yeon Kim; South Korea	Sabine Brogle; Germany	Deanna Coates; Great Britain
Rifle standing SH1	2004	Manuela Schmermund; Germany	Myung Sook Her; South Korea	Sabine Brogle; Germany
Rifle standing SH1	2008	Veronika Vadovicova; Slovakia	Manuela Schmermund; Germany	Nilda Gomez Lopez; Puerto Rico
Rifle standing SH1	2012	Zhang Cuiping; China	Manuela Schmermund; Germany	Natalie Smith; Australia
Rifle standing SH1	2016	Veronika Vadovicova; Slovakia	Zhang Cuiping; China	Yan Yaping; China
Rifle standing SH1	2020	Avani Lekhara; India	Zhang Cuiping; China	Iryna Shchetnik; Ukraine

=== Mixed events ===
==== Pistol ====
Class	Year	Gold	Silver	Bronze
Air pistol 2–5	1980	Alfred Bangerter; Switzerland	Oskar Kreuzer; Austria	Dave Tarrant; New Zealand
Air pistol SH1-3	1992	Ruzica Aleksov; Independent Paralympic Participants	Lone Overbye; Denmark	Heather Kuttai; Canada
Free pistol SH1-3	1992	Laszlo Decsi; Canada	Jae Hwan Paik; South Korea	Jan Boonen; Belgium
Sport pistol SH1-3	1992	Jan Boonen; Belgium	Luis Salgado; Spain	Hubert Aufschnaiter; Austria
Free pistol SH1	1996	Francisco Angel Soriano; Spain	Ruzica Aleksov; Yugoslavia	Andrey Lebedinsky; Russia
Free pistol SH1	2000	Jong In Choi; South Korea	Yelena Taranova; Azerbaijan	Francisco Angel Soriano; Spain
Free pistol SH1	2004	Andrey Lebedinsky; Russia	Roland Hartmann; Germany	Muharrem Korhan Yamac; Turkey
Sport pistol SH1	1996	Andrey Lebedinsky; Russia	James Nomarhas; Australia	Roland Hartmann; Germany
Sport pistol SH1	2000	Wei Huang; China	Peter Tait; Australia	Andrey Lebedinsky; Russia
Sport pistol SH1	2004	Muharrem Korhan Yamac; Turkey	Hubert Aufschnaiter; Austria	Andrey Lebedinsky; Russia
25m pistol SH1	2008	Andrey Lebedinsky; Russia	Li Jianfei; China	Valeriy Ponomarenko; Russia
25m pistol SH1	2012	Li Jianfei; China	Sergey Malyshev; Russia	Valery Ponomarenko; Russia
25m pistol SH1	2016	Huang Xing; China	Joackim Norberg; Sweden	Lee Ju-Hee; South Korea
25m pistol SH1	2020	Huang Xing; China	Szymon Sowiński; Poland	Oleksii Denysiuk; Ukraine
50m pistol SH1	2008	Park Sea-Kyun; South Korea	Lee Ju-Hee; South Korea	Valeriy Ponomarenko; Russia
50m pistol SH1	2012	Park Sea-Kyun; South Korea	Valery Ponomarenko; Russia	Ni Hedong; China
50m pistol SH1	2016	Sareh Javanmardi; Iran	Yang Chao; China	Oleksii Denysiuk; Ukraine
50m pistol SH1	2020	Manish Narwal; India	Singhraj Adhana; India	Sergey Malyshev; RPC

==== Rifle ====
Event	Year	Gold	Silver	Bronze
Rifle shooting 1A-1C	1976	R. Thibodeau; Canada	Joyce Murland; Canada	Yoseth Snarav; Israel
Rifle shooting 2–5	1976	Libby Richards; Australia	Martin Stadler; Switzerland	Yigal Tam; Israel
Rifle shooting amputee	1976	J. Byrns; Canada	Nissin Philossof; Israel	Gerhard Grinninger; Austria
Rifle 3 positions 1A-1C	1980	Jan Kristensen; Denmark	Barbara Caspers; Australia	Yvon Page; Canada
Rifle 3 positions 1A-1C	1984	Barbara Caspers; Australia	Peter Haslam; Great Britain; Jan Kristensen; Denmark	No bronze medalist; tie for silver
Rifle 3 positions 2–5	1980	J. Gruber; Austria	Libby Kosmala; Australia	Jonas Jacobsson; Sweden
Rifle kneeling 1A-1C	1980	Barbara Caspers; Australia	Philip Wouters; Belgium	Jan Kristensen; Denmark
Rifle prone 1A-1C	1980	Philip Wouters; Belgium	Yvon Page; Canada	P. Hommerson; Netherlands
Rifle prone 2–5	1980	Libby Kosmala; Australia	J. Gruber; Austria	Peter Klotz; Switzerland
Rifle prone 2–5	1988	Kazimierz Mechula; Denmark	Kwang Woon Cha; South Korea	Anders Lundvall; Sweden
Rifle standing 1A-1C	1980	Jan Kristensen; Denmark	Yvon Page; Canada	Barbara Caspers; Australia
Rifle standing 2–5	1980	Jonas Jacobsson; Sweden	J. Gruber; Austria	Bernard Pique; France
Rifle 3 positions SH1-2	1992	Im Yeon Kim; South Korea	Johann Brunner; Germany	Aloys Schneider; Germany
Rifle 3 positions SH2	1992	Johann Brunner; Germany	Anders Lundvall; Sweden	Jonas Jacobsson; Sweden
Rifle 3 positions SH2	1996	Thomas Johansson; Sweden	Lotta Helsinger; Sweden	Santo Mangano; Italy
Rifle 3 positions SH3	1992	Siegmar Henker; Germany	Kazimierz Mechula; Denmark	Joo Sik Lee; South Korea
Rifle 3 positions SH4	1992	Santo Mangano; Italy	Charlotte Streton; Denmark	Kevin John Hyde; Great Britain
Rifle standing SH1-3	1992	Deanna Coates; Great Britain	Im Yeon Kim; South Korea	Siegmar Henker; Germany
English Match SH1-3	1992	Aloys Schneider; Germany	Jin Dong Jung; South Korea	John Campbell; Great Britain
Olympic Match SH2	1992	Jonas Jacobsson; Sweden	Johann Brunner; Germany	Reino Landstedt; Finland
Olympic Match SH3	1992	Siegmar Henker; Germany	Kazimierz Mechula; Denmark	Oscar De Pellegrin; Italy
Olympic Match SH4	1992	Charlotte Streton; Denmark	Jan Kristensen; Denmark	Anja Nurmi; Finland
English match SH1	1996	Jonas Jacobsson; Sweden	Doron Shaziri; Israel	Oscar De Pellegrin; Italy
Rifle standing SH2	1996	Thomas Johansson; Sweden	Santo Mangano; Italy	Lotta Helsinger; Sweden
Rifle standing SH2	2000	Thomas Johansson; Sweden	Christiane Latzke; Germany	Raphaël Voltz; France
Rifle standing SH2	2004	Michael Johnson; New Zealand	Thomas Johansson; Sweden	Viktoria Wedin; Sweden
Rifle standing SH2	2008	Lee Ji-Seok; South Korea	Raphaël Voltz; France	Michael Johnson; New Zealand
Rifle standing SH2	2012	Kang Ju-Young; South Korea	Franček Gorazd Tiršek; Slovenia	Michael Johnson; New Zealand
Rifle standing SH2	2016	Veselka Pevec; Slovenia	Franček Gorazd Tiršek; Slovenia	Kim Geun-Soo; South Korea
Rifle standing SH2	2020	Philip Jönsson; Sweden	Franček Gorazd Tiršek; Slovenia	Andrea Liverani; Italy
Rifle prone SH1	1996	Enayatollah Bokharaei; Iran	Kazimierz Mechula; Denmark	Jonas Jacobsson; Sweden
Rifle prone SH1	2000	Enayatollah Bokharaei; Iran	Erkki Pekkala; Finland	Jonas Jacobsson; Sweden
Rifle prone SH1	2004	Jonas Jacobsson; Sweden	Jae Yong Sim; South Korea	Kazimierz Mechula; Denmark
Rifle prone SH1	2008	Matt Skelhon; Great Britain	Zhang Cuiping; China	Sim Jae-Yong; South Korea
Rifle prone SH1	2012	Cédric Fèvre; France	Matt Skelhon; Great Britain	Zhang Cuiping; China
Rifle prone SH1	2016	Veronika Vadovicova; Slovakia	Natascha Hiltrop; Germany	Lee Jang-Ho; South Korea
Rifle prone SH1	2020	Natascha Hiltrop; Germany	Park Jin-Ho; South Korea	Iryna Shchetnik; Ukraine
Rifle prone SH2	1996	Thomas Johansson; Sweden	Lotta Helsinger; Sweden	Santo Mangano; Italy
Rifle prone SH2	2000	Thomas Johansson; Sweden	Wolfgang Stoeckl; Germany	Eric Lacaze; France
Rifle prone SH2	2004	Minna Leinonen; Finland	Gyoung You Ho; South Korea	Johnny Andersen; Denmark
Rifle prone SH2	2008	Lee Ji-Seok; South Korea	Raphaël Voltz; France	Viktoria Wedin; Sweden
Rifle prone SH2	2012	Vasyl Kovalchuk; Ukraine	Raphaël Voltz; France	James Bevis; Great Britain
Rifle prone SH2	2016	Vasyl Kovalchuk; Ukraine	Kim Guen-Soo; South Korea	McKenna Dahl; United States
Rifle prone SH2	2020	Dragan Ristić; Serbia	Vasyl Kovalchuk; Ukraine	Franček Gorazd Tiršek; Slovenia
Free rifle prone SH1	2000	Jonas Jacobsson; Sweden	Doron Shaziri; Israel	Alfred Beringer; Germany
Free rifle prone SH1	2004	Jonas Jacobsson; Sweden	Ashley Adams; Australia	Doron Shaziri; Israel
50m rifle prone SH1	2008	Jonas Jacobsson; Sweden	Zhang Cuiping; China	Dong Chao; China
50m rifle prone SH1	2012	Abdullah Sultan Alaryani; United Arab Emirates	Juan Antonio Saavedra Reinaldo; Spain	Matt Skelhon; Great Britain
50m rifle prone SH1	2016	Zhang Cuiping; China	Abdullah Sultan Alaryani; United Arab Emirates	Laslo Šuranji; Serbia
50m rifle prone SH1	2020	Veronika Vadovicova; Slovakia	Anna Normann; Sweden	Juan Antonio Saavedra Reinaldo; Spain
50m rifle prone SH2	2020	Dragan Ristić; Serbia	Zdravko Savanović; Serbia	Vasyl Kovalchuk; Ukraine

=== Team events ===
Class	Year	Gold	Silver	Bronze
Men's rifle 3 positions team	1984	Netherlands (NED)	Sweden (SWE)	West Germany (FRG)
Men's rifle kneeling team	1984	Netherlands (NED)	Sweden (SWE)	France (FRA)
Men's rifle prone team	1984	France (FRA)	Netherlands (NED)	Sweden (SWE)
Men's rifle standing team	1984	Sweden (SWE)	West Germany (FRG)	Netherlands (NED)
Men's pistol team	1984	Austria (AUT)	Great Britain (GBR)	West Germany (FRG)
Mixed pistol team open	1988	Austria (AUT)	Canada (CAN)	France (FRA)
Mixed rifle 3 positions team	1988	West Germany (FRG)	South Korea (KOR)	Sweden (SWE)
Mixed rifle kneeling team	1988	South Korea (KOR)	West Germany (FRG)	Netherlands (NED)
Mixed rifle prone team	1988	Sweden (SWE)	South Korea (KOR)	France (FRA)
Mixed rifle standing team	1988	West Germany (FRG)	Netherlands (NED)	Sweden (SWE)

== See also ==
- Shooting at the Olympics
