= Shooting at the Summer Paralympics =

- Governing body: IPC
- Events: 12 (men: 3; women: 3; mixed: 6)

Games
- 1960; 1964; 1968; 1972; 1976; 1980; 1984; 1988; 1992; 1996; 2000; 2004; 2008; 2012; 2016; 2020; 2024
- Medalists

Paralympic shooting has been competed at the Summer Paralympic Games since 1976. Events include men's, women's, and mixed events using rifles and pistols.

== Summary ==
Games	Year	Events	Best Nation
1			
2			
3			
4			
5	1976	3	Canada
6	1980	11	Austria
7	1984	29	Australia
8	1988	23	South Korea
9	1992	16	Germany
10	1996	15	Sweden
11	2000	12	South Korea
12	2004	12	Sweden
13	2008	12	South Korea
14	2012	12	China
15	2016	12	China
16	2020	13	China
17	2024	13	South Korea

== Medal summary ==
Overall results from both rifle and pistol shooting events in all categories (men's, women's and mixed). Updated to the 2024 Summer Paralympics.

Rank	Nation	Gold	Silver	Bronze	Total
1	South Korea (KOR)	24	16	19	59
2	China (CHN)	24	14	10	48
3	Sweden (SWE)	24	13	16	53
4	Australia (AUS)	15	7	3	25
5	Germany (GER)	9	15	7	31
6	Iran (IRI)	8	0	2	10
7	France (FRA)	7	12	15	34
8	Great Britain (GBR)	7	10	12	29
9	West Germany (FRG)	7	5	8	20
10	Austria (AUT)	7	5	4	16
11	Slovakia (SVK)	7	4	1	12
12	Denmark (DEN)	5	12	5	22
13	Russia (RUS)	5	4	7	16
14	Netherlands (NED)	5	3	8	16
15	Italy (ITA)	5	2	7	14
16	Serbia (SRB)	4	2	1	7
17	Canada (CAN)	3	6	4	13
18	Slovenia (SLO)	3	6	2	11
19	Belgium (BEL)	3	5	2	10
20	Ukraine (UKR)	3	4	6	13
21	India (IND)	3	2	4	9
22	United Arab Emirates (UAE)	2	6	0	8
23	Yugoslavia (YUG)	2	2	0	4
24	Finland (FIN)	2	1	6	9
25	Independent Paralympic Participants (IPP)	2	1	0	3
26	Turkey (TUR)	1	3	3	7
27	United States (USA)	1	2	4	7
28	Spain (ESP)	1	2	3	6
29	Switzerland (SUI)	1	2	2	5
30	North Macedonia (MKD)	1	1	0	2
31	New Zealand (NZL)	1	0	3	4
32	Israel (ISR)	0	7	6	13
33	Uzbekistan (UZB)	0	1	2	3
34	Azerbaijan (AZE)	0	1	1	2
34	Poland (POL)	0	1	1	2
36	Brazil (BRA)	0	1	0	1
36	Chinese Taipei	0	1	0	1
36	Georgia (GEO)	0	1	0	1
36	Kazakhstan (KAZ)	0	1	0	1
40	Hong Kong (HKG)	0	0	1	1
40	Hungary (HUN)	0	0	1	1
40	Japan (JPN)	0	0	1	1
40	Puerto Rico (PUR)	0	0	1	1
40	RPC (RPC)	0	0	1	1
40	South Africa (RSA)	0	0	1	1
Totals (45 entries)		192	181	180	553

== Nations ==
Nation	60	64	68	72	76	80	84	88	92	96	00	04	08	12	16	20	Total
Argentina (ARG)														1			1
Australia (AUS)					3	2	10	8	3	7	11	5	4	6	6		11
Austria (AUT)					3	6	5		3	5	4	4	3	1			10
Azerbaijan (AZE)											1	1	1	2	1		5
Belgium (BEL)						4	2	3	11	3	3	3					7
Bosnia and Herzegovina (BIH)													1				1
Brazil (BRA)					4								1	1	4		4
Bulgaria (BUL)															1		1
Burma (BIR)					2												1
Canada (CAN)					5	3	3	9	7	5	4	5	2	2	1		11
China (CHN)								1	2	2	4	7	13	9	9		8
Chinese Taipei (TPE)										1		4	2	1			4
Croatia (CRO)									2		1	2	3	2	1		6
Cuba (CUB)														1			1
Cyprus (CYP)													1	1			2
Czech Republic (CZE)													1				1
Denmark (DEN)					3	4	6	5	4	6	4	3	3	2	1		11
Egypt (EGY)					4		3	5	1								4
Estonia (EST)										1	1	1	1				4
Finland (FIN)						1	3	5	6	6	6	6	4	2	1		10
France (FRA)						6	9	11	9	7	7	3	7	2	4		10
Germany (GER)									12	13	16	14	10	8	6		7
Great Britain (GBR)					2	5	19	18	11	9	6	3	4	12	11		11
Greece (GRE)												2	3	2	1		4
Hong Kong (HKG)							3	2	3	1	1	1	1	1	1		9
Hungary (HUN)													1	2	2		3
Independent Paralympic Participants (IPP)									4								1
India (IND)										1	1		1	1	1		5
Indonesia (INA)								3									1
Iran (IRI)										5	6	9	3	2	5		6
Iraq (IRQ)														1			1
Ireland (IRL)														1	2		2
Israel (ISR)					5	5	10	3	3	4	3	4	1	1	1		11
Italy (ITA)					1		3	3	5	6	5	5	5	5	3		10
Japan (JPN)											4	6	5	2	1		5
Kuwait (KUW)															1		1
North Macedonia (MKD)										1	2	3	2	2	2		6
Mongolia (MGL)													1	1	1		3
Netherlands (NED)						10	6	6	6	1	1						6
New Zealand (NZL)						1	2		1	1	1	2	1	1	3		9
Norway (NOR)					2	1				1	1		1	3	6		7
Poland (POL)											1	4	5	2	2		5
Portugal (POR)															1		1
Puerto Rico (PUR)								1	3	3	1	1	1				6
Russia (RUS)										4	5	6	6	7			5
Serbia (SRB)													4	5	5		3
Slovakia (SVK)											2	3	3	3	3		5
Slovenia (SLO)									2	3	3	4	2	3	4		7
South Africa (RSA)										2	1	1			1		4
South Korea (KOR)							2	14	9	6	12	11	12	12	11		9
Spain (ESP)								3	6	5	5	3	3	3	1		8
Sweden (SWE)					1	4	6	7	7	7	5	6	5	4	8		11
Switzerland (SUI)					1	5	6	4		5	5	5	1	1	2		10
Thailand (THA)											2	1	1	4	5		5
Turkey (TUR)												3	4	5	9		4
Ukraine (UKR)													4	6	6		3
United Arab Emirates (UAE)													1	2	4		3
United States (USA)							6	13	10	6	3	1	2	2	8		9
Uzbekistan (UZB)															1		1
Venezuela (VEN)									3	1							2
West Germany (FRG)					2		7	7									3
Yugoslavia (YUG)						1	3	4		5	1						5
Nations					14	15	20	23	26	32	36	35	44	44	42		
Competitors					39	59	114	139	131	133	139	142	140	140	147		
Year	60	64	68	72	76	80	84	88	92	96	00	04	08	12	16	20	

== See also ==
- Shooting at the Summer Olympics
