= Shooting at the 2004 Summer Paralympics – Women's 10 metre air rifle standing SH1 =

Women's 10m Air Rifle Standing SH1 at the XII Paralympic Games
- Paralympic Shooting
- Venue: Markopoulo Olympic Shooting Centre
- Dates: 18 September 2004
- Competitors: 18 from 14 nations
- Winning points: 493.0

Medalists
| 1st place, gold medalist(s) | | Manuela Schmermund | Germany |
| 2nd place, silver medalist(s) | | Her Myung Sook | South Korea |
| 3rd place, bronze medalist(s) | | Sabine Brogle | Germany |

The Women's 10m Air Rifle Standing SH1 shooting event at the 2004 Summer Paralympics was competed on 18 September. It was won by Manuela Schmermund, representing Germany.

== Preliminary ==
| Qualified for next round |

18 Sept. 2004, 09:00

| Rank | Athlete | Points | Notes |
|---|---|---|---|
| 1 | Manuela Schmermund (GER) | 392 | Q |
| 2 | Her Myung Sook (KOR) | 389 | Q |
| 3 | Kim Im Yeon (KOR) | 388 | Q |
| 4 | Sidegheh Barmaki Vishkaei (IRI) | 387 | Q |
| 5 | Deanna Coates (GBR) | 386 | Q |
| 6 | Sabine Brogle (GER) | 386 | Q |
| 7 | Xiao Wei Dong (CHN) | 385 | Q |
| 8 | Veronika Vadovicová (SVK) | 383 | Q |
| 9 | Zhang Nan (CHN) | 383 | |
| 10 | Sirkka Liisa Collin (FIN) | 381 | |
| 10 | Lotta Helsinger (SWE) | 381 | |
| 10 | Elizabeth Kosmala (AUS) | 381 | |
| 13 | Huang Lin Li Cho (TPE) | 380 | |
| 14 | Nilda Gómez López (PUR) | 377 | |
| 15 | Mahnaz Rasi Marzabady (IRI) | 374 | |
| 16 | Leung Shui Mai (HKG) | 367 | |
| 17 | Jolanta Szulc (POL) | 365 | |
| 18 | Georgia Dimopoulou (GRE) | 355 | |

== Final round ==
18 Sept. 2004, 12:00

| Rank | Athlete | Points | Notes |
|---|---|---|---|
| 1st place, gold medalist(s) | Manuela Schmermund (GER) | 493.0 | |
| 2nd place, silver medalist(s) | Her Myung Sook (KOR) | 489.3 | |
| 3rd place, bronze medalist(s) | Sabine Brogle (GER) | 488.6 | |
| 4 | Xiao Wei Dong (CHN) | 487.5 | |
| 5 | Sidegheh Barmaki Vishkaei (IRI) | 486.9 | |
| 6 | Kim Im Yeon (KOR) | 485.4 | |
| 7 | Deanna Coates (GBR) | 482.6 | |
| 8 | Veronika Vadovicová (SVK) | 480.1 | |
