= Shooting at the 2004 Summer Paralympics – Women's 50 metre rifle 3 positions SH1 =

Women's 50m Sport Rifle 3x20 SH1 at the XII Paralympic Games
- Paralympic Shooting
- Venue: Markopoulo Olympic Shooting Centre
- Dates: 20 September 2004
- Competitors: 10 from 7 nations
- Winning points: 661.6

Medalists
1st place, gold medalist(s)		Her Myung Sook	South Korea
2nd place, silver medalist(s)		Kim Im Yeon	South Korea
3rd place, bronze medalist(s)		Manuela Schmermund	Germany

The Women's 50m Sport Rifle 3x20 SH1 shooting event at the 2004 Summer Paralympics was competed on 20 September. It was won by Her Myung Sook, representing South Korea.

== Preliminary ==
Qualified for next round

20 Sept. 2004, 09:00

Rank	Athlete	Points	Notes
1	Her Myung Sook (KOR)	564	Q
2	Kim Im Yeon (KOR)	562	Q
3	Zhang Nan (CHN)	558	Q
4	Xu Yan Qin (CHN)	557	Q
5	Manuela Schmermund (GER)	557	Q
6	Veronika Vadovicová (SVK)	554	Q
7	Sabine Brogle (GER)	543	Q
8	Elizabeth Kosmala (AUS)	542	Q
9	Jolanta Szulc (POL)	528	
10	Nilda Gómez López (PUR)	519	

== Final round ==
20 Sept. 2004, 13:00

Rank	Athlete	Points	Notes
1st place, gold medalist(s)	Her Myung Sook (KOR)	661.6	WR
2nd place, silver medalist(s)	Kim Im Yeon (KOR)	657.2	
3rd place, bronze medalist(s)	Manuela Schmermund (GER)	653.1	
4	Zhang Nan (CHN)	649.8	
5	Xu Yan Qin (CHN)	646.3	
6	Veronika Vadovicová (SVK)	645.1	
7	Sabine Brogle (GER)	637.8	
8	Elizabeth Kosmala (AUS)	631.1	
