= Shooting at the 2012 Summer Paralympics – Women's 10 metre air rifle standing SH1 =

Women's 10 metre air rifle standing SH1 at the XIV Paralympic Games
- Venue: Royal Artillery Barracks
- Dates: 30 August 2012
- Competitors: 19 from 12 nations

Medalists
1st place, gold medalist(s)		Cuiping Zhang	China
2nd place, silver medalist(s)		Manuela Schmermund	Germany
3rd place, bronze medalist(s)		Natalie Smith	Australia

The Women's 10 metre air rifle standing SH1 event at the 2012 Summer Paralympics took place on 30 August at the Royal Artillery Barracks in Woolwich.

The event consisted of two rounds: a qualifier and a final. In the qualifier, each shooter fired 40 shots with an air rifle at 10 metres distance from the "standing" (interpreted to include seated in wheelchairs) position. Scores for each shot were in increments of 1, with a maximum score of 10.

The top 8 shooters in the qualifying round moved on to the final round. There, they fired an additional 10 shots. These shots scored in increments of .1, with a maximum score of 10.9. The total score from all 50 shots were used to determine the final ranking.

== Qualification round ==
Rank	Athlete	Country	1	2	3	4	Total	Notes
1	Cuiping Zhang	China	99	98	99	100	396	Q, PR
2	Wasana Keatjaratkul	Thailand	99	98	97	99	393	Q
3	Veronika Vadovičová	Slovakia	100	97	98	98	393	Q
4	Natalie Smith	Australia	98	99	97	98	392	Q
5	Lee Yoo-Jeong	South Korea	98	97	97	99	391	Q
6	Lee Yun-Ri	South Korea	98	96	99	98	391	Q
7	Manuela Schmermund	Germany	98	100	96	97	391	Q
8	Libby Kosmala	Australia	99	96	98	98	391	Q
9	Deanna Coates	Great Britain	99	98	98	94	389	
10	Shibei Dang	China	98	98	97	96	389	
11	Lotta Helsinger	Sweden	94	97	97	99	387	
12	Karen Butler	Great Britain	97	97	95	95	384	
13	Huan He	China	98	96	96	94	384	
14	Delphine Fischer	France	94	96	95	97	382	
15	Natascha Hiltrop	Germany	96	93	97	95	381	
16	Amanda Pankhurst	Great Britain	95	94	94	97	380	
17	Jolanta Szulc	Poland	96	94	92	92	374	
18	Farah Al-Waeli	Iraq	92	94	94	93	373	
19	Azzurra Ciani	Italy	91	95	91	92	369	

Q – Qualified for final

== Final ==
Rank	Athlete	Country	Qual	1	2	3	4	5	6	7	8	9	10	Final	Total
1st place, gold medalist(s)	Cuiping Zhang	China	396	10.7	10.6	10.4	10.0	10.8	10.4	10.8	10.4	10.5	10.3	104.9	500.9
2nd place, silver medalist(s)	Manuela Schmermund	Germany	391	10.2	10.1	10.0	10.5	10.3	10.3	10.5	10.6	10.6	9.5	102.6	493.6
3rd place, bronze medalist(s)	Natalie Smith	Australia	392	10.7	10.7	9.2	9.7	9.6	10.7	10.1	9.6	9.6	10.5	100.4	492.4
4	Lee Yun-Ri	South Korea	391	10.2	9.7	10.4	10.3	10.0	10.0	10.0	10.4	10.3	10.0	101.3	492.3
5	Wasana Keatjaratkul	Thailand	393	10.2	9.9	10.5	9.1	9.9	10.0	9.9	9.9	10.1	9.8	99.3	492.3
6	Lee Yoo-Jeong	South Korea	391	9.9	9.3	9.6	9.8	10.4	10.4	9.8	10.8	10.2	10.7	100.9	491.9
7	Veronika Vadovičová	Slovakia	393	10.2	9.7	10.1	9.9	10.1	9.7	8.8	9.1	10.6	10.1	98.3	491.3
8	Libby Kosmala	Australia	391	8.6	9.7	10.8	9.6	10.2	8.9	9.6	10.6	9.9	9.8	97.7	488.7
