= Shooting at the 2004 Summer Paralympics – Men's 50 metre rifle 3 positions SH1 =

Men's 50m Free Rifle 3x40 SH1 at the XII Paralympic Games
- Paralympic Shooting
- Venue: Markopoulo Olympic Shooting Centre
- Dates: 21 September 2004
- Competitors: 24 from 17 nations
- Winning points: 1261.1

Medalists
1st place, gold medalist(s)		Jonas Jacobsson	Sweden
2nd place, silver medalist(s)		Dan Jordan	United States
3rd place, bronze medalist(s)		Doron Shaziri	Israel

The Men's 50m Free Rifle 3x40 SH1 shooting event at the 2004 Summer Paralympics was competed on 21 September. It was won by Jonas Jacobsson, representing Sweden.

== Preliminary ==
Qualified for next round

21 Sept. 2004, 11:00

Rank	Athlete	Points	Notes
1	Jonas Jacobsson (SWE)	1162	WR Q
2	Dan Jordan (USA)	1157	Q
3	Doron Shaziri (ISR)	1146	Q
4	Pyun Moo Jo (KOR)	1142	Q
5	Franc Pinter (SLO)	1135	Q
6	Ashley Adams (AUS)	1134	Q
7	Josef Neumaier (GER)	1129	Q
8	August Wyss (SUI)	1128	Q
9	Werner Mueller (AUT)	1127	
9	Jung Jin Owan (KOR)	1127	
11	Cedric Friggeri (FRA)	1125	
12	Han Tae Ho (KOR)	1123	
13	Walter Holzner (AUT)	1118	
14	Daniele de Michiel (ITA)	1114	
15	Joachim Schaefer (GER)	1111	
16	Glenn Mariash (CAN)	1110	
17	Kazimierz Mechula (DEN)	1107	
18	Norbert Gau (GER)	1104	
19	Jozef Siroky (SVK)	1103	
20	Bjorn Samuelsson (SWE)	1092	
21	Hans Peter Steffen (SUI)	1084	
22	Waldemar Andruszkiewicz (POL)	1066	
23	Victor Firsov (RUS)	1055	
24	Miguel Orobitg (ESP)	DNF	

== Final round ==
21 Sept. 2004, 16:00

Rank	Athlete	Points	Notes
1st place, gold medalist(s)	Jonas Jacobsson (SWE)	1261.1	WR
2nd place, silver medalist(s)	Dan Jordan (USA)	1253.5	
3rd place, bronze medalist(s)	Doron Shaziri (ISR)	1243.8	
4	Pyun Moo Jo (KOR)	1241.3	
5	Ashley Adams (AUS)	1231.9	
6	Franc Pinter (SLO)	1228.7	
7	Josef Neumaier (GER)	1221.2	
8	August Wyss (SUI)	1217.2	
