= Ryan Cockbill =

British Paralympic sport shooter

Personal information
- Born: 16 June 1990 (age 36) Birmingham, England

Sport
- Country: Great Britain
- Sport: Shooting
- Event: Air rifle
- Club: NSRA Aldersley; Rugeley Rifle Club
- Coached by: Pasan Kularatne

Achievements and titles
- Paralympic finals: 2012

Ryan Cockbill (born 16 June 1990) is a British sport shooter. In 2012 he represented Great Britain at the Summer Paralympics in London taking part in the R4 and R5 100m air rifle SH2.

== Personal history ==
Cockbill was born in Birmingham, England in 1990. At the age of 16 he attended a friend's party to celebrate the end of their GCSE exams. During the party Cockbill decided to belly flop into a child's paddle pool which resulted in a compression fracture to his spine leaving him paralyzed from the waist down.

== Shooting career ==
Cockbill was introduced to para-shooting during his rehabilitation at hospital following his accident. His first international competition was the 2010 IPC World Cup in Sczcecin, Poland, where he took silver in the R4 10m Air Rifle Standing mixed SH2 and bronze in the R5 10m Air Rifle Prone mixed SH2. The same year he represented Great Britain at the IPC World Championships, finishing 26th in the R4 - 10m Air Rifle Standing SH2. In 2011 he entered the IPC Shooting World Cup at Fort Benning in the United States, winning bronze in the R5 10m Air Rifle Prone mixed SH2.

In 2012 Cockbill secured a place at the London Paralympics, representing Great Britain. He competed in two events, finishing 21st in the R4 10m Air Rifle Standing mixed SH2 and 17th in the R5 10m Air Rifle Prone mixed SH2.

At the 2015 Stoke Mandeville Shooting World Cup Cockbill took six medals, including a gold in the R4 - 10m Air Rifle Standing SH2. He followed this at the next year's cup with another two bronze medals.

In 2016, Cockbill was part of the GB team that set a new team world record at the IPC Shooting World Cup in Al Ain, alongside James Bevis and Tim Jeffery.

In 2022 at the Shooting Para Sport World Championships he won a Bronze medal in the R4 Mixed 10m Air Rifle Standing SH2 event.
