= Italy at the 1988 Summer Paralympics =

- IPC code: ITA
- NPC: Comitato Italiano Paralimpico
- Website: www.comitatoparalimpico.it (in Italian)

in Seoul
- Competitors: 96 (69 men and 27 women)
- Medals Ranked 16th: Gold 16 Silver 15 Bronze 27 Total 58

Summer Paralympics appearances (overview)
- 1960; 1964; 1968; 1972; 1976; 1980; 1984; 1988; 1992; 1996; 2000; 2004; 2008; 2012; 2016; 2020; 2024

96 athletes (69 men and 27 women) from Italy competed at the 1988 Summer Paralympics in Seoul, South Korea.

== Medals by sport ==
Discipline	Gold	Silver	Bronze	Total
Swimming	5	5	11	21
Athletics	5	4	11	20
Shooting	4	1	0	5
Fencing	2	3	4	9
Archery	0	1	1	2
Judo	0	1	0	1
Totals (6 entries)	16	15	27	58

== Medalists ==
=== Gold ===
Medal	Name	Sport	Event
Gold	Sabrina Bulleri	Athletics	Women's 100 m 3
Gold	Sabrina Bulleri	Athletics	Women's 200 m 3
Gold	Francesca Porcellato	Athletics	Women's 100 m 2
Gold	Francesca Porcellato; Milena Balsamo; Tina Varano; Sabrina Bulleri	Athletics	Women's 4 × 100 m Relay 2-6
Gold	Italo Sacchetto	Athletics	Men's High Jump B1
Gold	Gabriele Celegato	Shooting	Men's Air Pistol 2-6
Gold	Santo Mangano	Shooting	Men's Air Rifle 2 Positions with Aids 1A-1C
Gold	Santo Mangano	Shooting	Men's Air Rifle Kneeling with Aids 1A-1C
Gold	Santo Mangano	Shooting	Men's Air Rifle Prone with Aids 1A-1C
Gold	Ernesto Giussani	Swimming	Men's 50 m Backstroke 2
Gold	Luca Pancalli	Swimming	Men's 100 m Freestyle 1C
Gold	Luca Pancalli	Swimming	Men's 25 m Breaststroke 1C
Gold	Luca Pancalli	Swimming	Men's 50 m Freestyle 1C
Gold	Alvise De Vidi	Swimming	Men's 25 m Butterfly 1A
Gold	Laura Presutto	Wheelchair Fencing	Women's Foil Individual 4-6
Gold	Luigi Zonghi	Wheelchair Fencing	Men's Épée Individual 1C-3

=== Silver ===
Medal	Name	Sport	Event
Silver	Fabio Amadi; Giuseppe Gabelli; Giuliano Koten; Orazio Pizzorni	Archery	Team class 2-6
Silver	Claudio Costa	Athletics	800m class B1
Silver	Rossella Inverni	Athletics	800m class B1
Silver	Rossella Inverni	Athletics	1500m class B1
Silver	Francesca Porcellato	Athletics	200m class 2
Silver	Walter Monti	Judo	Over 95 kg
Silver	Rita Pieri	Shooting	Rifle class 2-6
Silver	Ernesto Giussani	Swimming	50m backstroke class 2
Silver	Stefano Giovanetti	Swimming	100m breatstroke class A52
Silver	Luca Pancalli	Swimming	25m backstroke class 1C
Silver	Gianluca Saini	Swimming	100m freestyle class L6
Silver	Gianluca Saini	Swimming	200m medley L6
Silver	Mariella Bestini	Fencing	Individual épée class 1C-3
Silver	Soriano Ceccanti	Fencing	Individual épée class 1C-3
Silver	Rossana Giarrizzo; Laura Presutto; Mariella Bertini	Fencing	Team foil

=== Bronze ===
Medal	Name	Sport	Event
Bronze	Paola Fantato	Archery	Double class 2-6
Bronze	Carmelo Addaris; Gennaro Misto; Rodolfo Rossi; Alvise De Vidi	Athletics	4X100m relay class 1A-1C
Bronze	Carmelo Addaris	Athletics	5000m class 1C
Bronze	Carmelo Addaris	Athletics	slalom class 1C
Bronze	Milena Balsamo; Sabrina Bulleri; Francesca Porcellato; Cinzia Pozzoboni	Athletics	4X200m relay class 2-6
Bronze	Milena Balsamo; Francesca Porcellato; Cinzia Pozzoboni; Tina Varano	Athletics	4X400m relay class 2-6
Bronze	Claudio Costa	Athletics	400m class B1
Bronze	Paolo D'Agostini	Athletics	Club throw 1A
Bronze	Rossella Inverni	Athletics	100m class B1
Bronze	Rossella Inverni	Athletics	400m class B1
Bronze	Alessandro Kuris	Athletics	Pentathlon class A4- A9
Bronze	Giovanni Loiacono	Athletics	Discus class C5
Bronze	Aldo Manganaro	Athletics	100m class B3
Bronze	Renato Misurini	Athletics	Pentathlon class 3
Bronze	Corrado Daglio	Swimming	100m backstroke class B1
Bronze	Maurizio Galliani	Swimming	3X25m freestyle class 1A-1C
Bronze	Maurizio Galliani	Swimming	100m freestyle class 1A
Bronze	Maurizio Galliani	Swimming	50m freestyle class 1A
Bronze	Stefano Giovanetti	Swimming	100m freestyle class A5
Bronze	Ernesto Giussani	Swimming	200m freestyle class 2
Bronze	Ernesto Giussani	Swimming	50m breatstroke class 2
Bronze	Luca Pancalli	Swimming	3X25m freestyle class 1A- 1C
Bronze	Alessandro Pisetta	Swimming	100m backstroke class L6
Bronze	Gianluca Saini	Swimming	400m freestyle class L6
Bronze	Franco Scotto	Swimming	3X25m freestyle class 1A- 1C
Bronze	Giuseppe Alfieri; Soriano Ceccanti; Luigi Zonghi; Umberto Mastrofini	Fencing	Team foil
Bronze	Rossana Giarrizzo	Fencing	Individuale foil class 4-6
Bronze	Ernesto Lerre; Umberto Mastrofini; Pierino Scarsella; Giuseppe Alfieri	Fencing	Team foil
Bronze	Carlo Loa; Luigi Zonghi; Ernesto Lerre; Soriano Ceccanti	Fencing	Team sabre

== See also ==
- Italy at the Paralympics
- Italy at the 1988 Summer Olympics
