= James Bevis =

British Paralympic sport shooter (born 1976)

Personal information
- Born: 8 August 1976 (age 49) Hereford

Sport
- Country: United Kingdom
Medal record
Shooting para sport
Representing Great Britain
Paralympic Games
Bronze medal – third place	2012 London	Mixed 10m air rifle prone SH2

James Bevis (born 8 August 1976 in Hereford) is a British sports-shooter who won a bronze medal in Shooting at the 2012 Summer Paralympics in the Mixed 10 metre air rifle prone SH2.

In 2016, Bevis was part of the GB team that set a new team world record at the IPC Shooting World Cup in Al Ain, alongside Ryan Cockbill and Tim Jeffery.

He was selected to represent GB at the delayed 2020 Tokyo Paralympic Games.
