= List of athletes who have competed in the Paralympics and Olympics =

This is a list of athletes who have competed in both the Paralympic and the Olympic Games.

== History ==
Long before the Paralympic Games, American gymnast George Eyser, who had a wooden leg, competed at the 1904 Summer Olympics, and won three gold medals, two silver and a bronze, including a gold in the vault, an event which then included a jump over a long horse without aid of a springboard. There have also been other amputee medallists at the Olympic Games prior to the creation of the Paralympics. Olivér Halassy of Hungary, whose left leg was amputated below the knee, won three medals (two gold and a silver) in water polo, in 1928, 1932 and 1936. Károly Takács, also of Hungary, won gold in shooting at the 1948 Summer Olympics. His right hand had been "shattered by a grenade" ten years earlier, and he had taught himself to shoot with his left. Deaf Hungarian fencer Ildikó Újlaky-Rejtő won two individual medals (a gold and a bronze) and five team medals at the Olympics between 1960 and 1976. She never competed at the Deaflympics, as fencing was never part of the event's programme.

Several athletes with disabilities have competed in both the Olympic Games and Paralympic Games.

New Zealander Neroli Fairhall was the first paraplegic competitor in the Olympic Games. After competing in the 1980 Summer Paralympics, Fairhall won gold when archery was held during the 1982 Commonwealth Games in Brisbane. Another athlete, visually impaired Canadian skier Brian McKeever, was selected to compete at the 2010 Winter Olympic Games in Vancouver, but was ultimately set aside by his coach. However, Brian's brother, Robin McKeever, who has won several medals at the Winter Paralympics as Brian's sighted guide, participated in cross-country skiing at the 1998 Winter Olympics in Nagano. Deaf South African swimmer Terence Parkin won a silver medal in the 200-meter breaststroke at the Sydney Olympic Games in 2000 and also participated in 2004 in Athens, but never participated in the Paralympics as it does not cater for deaf swimmers.

South African runner Oscar Pistorius is the men's T43 world record holder in the 100, 200 and 400 metres events. With a 400 metres time of 45.07 seconds recorded on 19 July 2011, he achieved the "A" qualifying requirement for the 2011 World Championships and the 2012 Summer Olympics. In London 2012, Pistorius became the first amputee to run at the Summer Olympic Games, where he competed in the 400m and 4 × 400 relay events, but did not win a medal.

The two-time winner of the Olympic Marathon, Ethiopian Abebe Bikila, a wheelchair user since a car accident in 1969, never participated in the Paralympic Games, because the Ethiopian Archery team failed to arrive in Heidelberg for the 1972 Summer Paralympics.

== The list ==
| Athlete (Nation) | Impairment | Paralympic Games | | Olympic Games | | Ref. |
| Athlete (Nation) | Impairment | Edition | Sport | Edition | Sport | Ref. |
|---|---|---|---|---|---|---|
| Neroli Fairhall (NZL) | Wheelchair user | 1980 Arnhem; 1988 Seoul; 2000 Sydney | Archery | 1984 Los Angeles | Archery | |
| Sonia Vettenburg (BEL) | Wheelchair user | 1984 New York/Stoke Mandeville; 1988 Seoul | Shooting sport | 1992 Barcelona | Shooting sport | |
| Pál Szekeres (HUN) | Wheelchair user | 1992 Barcelona; 1996 Atlanta; 2000 Sydney; 2004 Athens; 2008 Beijing; 2012 London | Wheelchair fencing | 1988 Seoul | Fencing | |
| Paola Fantato (ITA) | Wheelchair user due to poliomyelitis | 1988 Seoul; 1992 Barcelona; 1996 Atlanta; 2000 Sydney; 2004 Athens | Archery | 1996 Atlanta | Archery | |
| Marla Runyan (USA) | Visually impaired | 1992 Barcelona; 1996 Atlanta | Athletics | 2000 Sydney; 2004 Athens | Athletics | |
| Orazio Fagone (ITA) | Leg amputation | 2006 Turin; 2010 Vancouver | Sledge hockey | 1988 Calgary; 1992 Albertville; 1994 Lillehammer | Short track | |
| Natalia Partyka (POL) | Congenital amputation of right hand | 2000 Sydney; 2004 Athens; 2008 Beijing; 2012 London; 2016 Rio; 2020 Tokyo; 2024 Paris | Para table tennis | 2008 Beijing; 2012 London; 2016 Rio; 2020 Tokyo | Table tennis | |
| Natalie du Toit (RSA) | Leg amputation | 2004 Athens; 2008 Beijing; 2012 London | Paralympic swimming | 2008 Beijing | Swimming | |
| Misty Thomas (CAN) | ACL injury | 2008 Beijing | Wheelchair basketball | 1984 Los Angeles | Basketball | |
| Oscar Pistorius (RSA) | Bilateral below-knee amputation | 2004 Athens; 2008 Beijing; 2012 London | Athletics | 2012 London | Athletics | |
| Assunta Legnante (ITA) | Visually impaired | 2012 London; 2016 Rio | Athletics | 2008 Beijing | Athletics | |
| Pepo Puch (AUT) | Paraplegia | 2012 London; 2016 Rio | Equestrian | 2004 Athens | Equestrian | |
| Ilke Wyludda (GER) | Leg amputation | 2012 London | Athletics | 1992 Barcelona; 1996 Atlanta; 2000 Sydney | Athletics | |
| Zahra Nemati (IRI) | Wheelchair user | 2012 London; 2016 Rio | Archery | 2016 Rio | Archery | |
| Melissa Tapper (AUS) | Nerve damage in right arm | 2012 London; 2016 Rio; 2020 Tokyo; 2024 Paris | Para table tennis | 2016 Rio; 2020 Tokyo; 2024 Paris | Table tennis | |
| Sandra Paović (CRO) | Paralysis due to accident | 2016 Rio | Para table tennis | 2008 Beijing | Table tennis | |
| Michal Feinblat (ISR) | Sports injury | 2020 Tokyo | Pararowing | 2004 Athens | Judo | |
| Kate O'Brien (CAN) | Sports injury | 2020 Tokyo; 2024 Paris | Para-cycling | 2016 Rio | Cycling | |
| Bruna Costa Alexandre (BRA) | Amputation of right arm | 2016 Rio; 2020 Tokyo; 2024 Paris | Para table tennis | 2024 Paris | Table tennis | |
| Damien Letulle (FRA) | Paraplegia | 2024 Paris | Archery | 1996 Atlanta | Archery | |
| Kathrin Marchand (GER) | Stroke | 2024 Paris; 2026 Milano-Cortina d'Ampezzo | Pararowing; Para Nordic skiing | 2012 London; 2016 Rio | Rowing | |
| Emanuel Perathoner (ITA) | Sports injury | 2026 Milano-Cortina d'Ampezzo | Para snowboard | 2018 Pyeongchang | Snowboard | |

== Olympic and Paralympic medal winners ==
There is at present only one athlete who has won a medal at the Olympics prior to becoming disabled, and has then gone on to win medals at the Paralympics. Hungarian fencer Pál Szekeres won a bronze medal at the 1988 Summer Olympics, then was disabled in a bus accident, and went on to win three gold medals and three bronze in wheelchair fencing at the Paralympics.

In 2012, Craig MacLean, a British track cyclist and Olympic silver medalist was the sighted pilot for Anthony Kappes as they won gold in the 2012 Paralympic Games. For the first time in those games, the sighted guides of blind athletes were also awarded medals, and MacLean, although not himself disabled, became only the second athlete to win medals in both the Olympic and Paralympic Games.

As the Paralympic Games have gained prestige and benefited from funding and specifically with the decision to allow able bodied 'guides' to win medals, especially when competing with blind athletes, the cross-over from Olympics to Paralympics has become a more common route for elite Olympic athletes as their careers in able-bodied sport have wound down. At the 2020 Summer Paralympics, three of the top four 'pilots' in the Men's individual pursuit for blind athletes were former elite level track cyclists in their own right, with four time 'Kilo' World Champion Francois Pervis of France becoming the third athlete to win both Olympic and Paralympic medals, as sighted 'pilot' for 'stoker' Raphael Beaugillet.

Emil Jönsson Haag won two Olympic medals in cross-country skiing in 2014. In 2022, he won three Paralympic medals as sighted guide for Zebastian Modin, also in cross-country skiing

== Sighted guides ==
There are sighted guides, such as Robin McKeever and Craig MacLean who have participated in both the Olympic and Paralympic Games. MacLean won a silver medal in the team sprint at the 2000 Olympic Games and a gold medal as a tandem pilot in the tandem sprint at the 2012 Paralympic Games.

== Olympic wheelchair races ==
From 1984 to 2004, numerous athletes competed in wheelchair racing at the Olympics. Medals were not awarded and the contests were incorporated into the Olympics athletics programme as demonstration events only. Wheelchair competitors in these races are not typically considered to have competed in the Olympics programme proper, as they were neither medal events nor incorporated able-bodied athletes.

== See also ==
- Disability categories at the Paralympic Games
- Deaf people in the Olympics
