= Slovenia at the 1996 Summer Paralympics =

- IPC code: SLO
- NPC: Sports Federation for the Disabled of Slovenia
- Website: www.zsis.si

in Atlanta
- Competitors: 14 (13 men and 1 woman)
- Medals Ranked 53rd: Gold 0 Silver 2 Bronze 3 Total 5

Summer Paralympics appearances (overview)
- 1992; 1996; 2000; 2004; 2008; 2012; 2016; 2020; 2024

Other related appearances
- Yugoslavia (1972–2000)

14 athletes (13 men and 1 woman) from Slovenia competed at the 1996 Summer Paralympics in Atlanta, United States.

== Medallists ==
Medal	Name	Sport	Event
Silver	Franjo Izlakar	Athletics	Men's shot put F36
Silver	Franc Pinter	Shooting	Men's air rifle standing SH1
Bronze	Janez Roškar	Athletics	Men's javelin F54
Bronze	Danijel Pavlinec	Swimming	Men's 100m freestyle S6
Bronze	Danijel Pavlinec	Swimming	Men's 200m freestyle S6

== See also ==
- Slovenia at the Paralympics
- Slovenia at the 1996 Summer Olympics
