= Shooting at the 2012 Summer Paralympics – Mixed 10 metre air rifle prone SH2 =

Mixed 10 metre air rifle prone SH2 at the XIV Paralympic Games
- Venue: Royal Artillery Barracks
- Dates: 1 September
- Competitors: 31 from 18 nations

Medalists
1st place, gold medalist(s)		Vasyl Kovalchuk	Ukraine
2nd place, silver medalist(s)		Raphaël Voltz	France
3rd place, bronze medalist(s)		James Bevis	Great Britain

The Mixed 10 metre air rifle prone SH2 event at the 2012 Summer Paralympics took place on 1 September at the Royal Artillery Barracks in Woolwich.

== Format ==
The event features both male and female athletes and consists of two rounds: a qualifier and a final. In the qualifier, each shooter fires 60 shots with an air rifle at 10 metres distance from the prone position, using a spring-mounted stand to replicate the movement of the front hand. Scores for each shot are in increments of 1, with a maximum score of 10.

The top 8 shooters in the qualifying round move on to the final round. There, they fire an additional 10 shots. These shots score in increments of .1, with a maximum score of 10.9. The total score from all 70 shots is used to determine final ranking.

== Qualification round ==
Rank	Gender	Athlete	Country	1	2	3	4	5	6	Average	Total	Notes
=1	M	Youngjun Jeong	South Korea	100	100	100	100	100	100	10	600-60x	
=1	M	Vasyl Kovalchuk	Ukraine	100	100	100	100	100	100	10	600-60x	
=1	M	Jiseok Lee	South Korea	100	100	100	100	100	100	10	600-59x	
=1	M	Damjan Pavlin	Slovenia	100	100	100	100	100	100	10	600-59x	
=1	F	Georgina Callingham	Great Britain	100	100	100	100	100	100	10	600-58x	
=1	M	Michael Johnson	New Zealand	100	100	100	100	100	100	10	600-58x	
=1	M	Raphaël Voltz	France	100	100	100	100	100	100	10	600-57x	
=1	M	James Bevis	Great Britain	100	100	100	100	100	100	10	600-56x	
=1	M	Jonas Andersen	Denmark	100	100	100	100	100	100	10	600-55x	
=1	M	Bradley Mark	Australia	100	100	100	100	100	100	10	600-54x	
11	M	Tanguy de la Forest	France	100	99	100	100	100	100	9.983	599-57x	
12	M	Juyoungjun Kang	South Korea	100	100	100	99	100	100	9.983	599-57x	
13	F	Sonja Jennie Tobiassen	Norway	100	100	100	100	100	99	9.983	599-57x	
14	F	Minna Sinikka Leinonen	Finland	99	100	100	100	100	100	9.983	599-54x	
15	M	Andreas Schaefers	Germany	100	100	100	99	100	100	9.983	599-54x	
16	M	Hongxiang Yuan	China	100	100	100	100	99	100	9.983	599-51x	
17	M	Ryan Cockbill	Great Britain	100	100	100	100	99	99	9.967	598-58x	
18	M	Sinisa Vidic	Serbia	100	99	99	100	100	100	9.966	598-55x	
19	M	Dragan Ristic	Serbia	100	100	100	99	100	99	9.967	598-55x	
20	M	Cedric Rio	France	100	99	100	99	100	100	9.967	598-53x	
21	F	Akiko Sega	Japan	99	99	100	100	100	100	9.967	598-51x	
22	M	Ivica Bratonovic	Croatia	100	100	98	99	100	100	9.950	597-53x	
23	M	Evangelos Kakosaios	Greece	99	100	98	100	100	99	9.933	596-51x	
24	F	Theodara Moutsiou	Greece	100	100	97	100	100	99	9.933	596-50x	
25	M	Doug Blessin	Canada	100	98	98	99	100	100	9.917	595-45x	
26	M	Leopold Rupp	Germany	99	100	100	99	98	99	9.917	595-44x	
27	M	Jason Maroney	Australia	100	99	98	99	99	99	9.900	594-50x	
28	M	Luke Cain	Australia	98	97	100	100	99	98	9.867	592-48x	
29	M	Gorazd Francek Tirsek	Slovenia	100	98	98	100	96	98	9.833	590-42x	
30	M	Stanko Piljak	Croatia	98	95	99	100	98	99	9.817	589-37x	
31	M	Massimo Dalla Casa	Italy	97	98	97	100	99	97	9.800	588-39x	

Green qualifies for the final

== Final ==
Rank	Gender	Athlete	Country	1	2	3	4	5	6	7	8	9	10	Total	Final	Notes
1st place, gold medalist(s)	M	Vasyl Kovalchuk	Ukraine	10.8	10.3	10.8	10.5	10.5	10.8	10.5	10.8	10.5	10.9	106.4	706.4	PR
2nd place, silver medalist(s)	M	Raphaël Voltz	France	10.8	10.7	10.6	10.7	10.7	10.3	10.4	10.9	10.7	10.1	105.9	705.9	Shoot-off:10.5
3rd place, bronze medalist(s)	M	James Bevis	Great Britain	10.6	10.5	10.6	10.6	10.7	10.7	10.4	10.8	10.4	10.6	105.9	705.9	Shoot-off:10.4
4	M	Michael Johnson	New Zealand	10.5	10.6	10.3	10.5	10.7	10.6	10.7	10.7	10.4	10.7	105.7	705.7	
5	M	Damjan Pavlin	Slovenia	10.7	10.6	10.7	10.4	10.6	10.8	10.7	10.3	10.2	10.6	105.6	705.6	
6	M	Jiseok Lee	South Korea	10.6	10.5	10.8	10.5	10.7	10.6	10.4	10.4	10.8	10.1	105.4	705.4	
7	F	Georgina Callingham	Great Britain	10.6	10.0	10.8	10.5	10.2	10.5	10.8	10.7	10.6	10.5	105.2	705.2	
8	M	Youngjun Jeong	South Korea	10.2	10.6	10.0	10.6	10.6	10.7	10.4	10.4	10.6	10.5	104.6	704.6	
