= Ruth Keidar =

Israeli Paralympic shooter

Personal information
- Native name: רות קידר

Sport
- Country: Israel
- Sport: Paralympic shooting
Medal record
Event	1st	2nd	3rd
Paralympic Games	0	1	0
Stoke Mandeville Games	0	1	0
Women's shooting para sport
Representing Israel
Paralympic Games
Silver medal – second place	1988 Seoul	Air Rifle Kneeling 2-6
Stoke Mandeville Games
Silver medal – second place	1987	

Ruth Keidar (Hebrew: רות קידר; died 18 June 1998) was an Israeli Paralympic shooter.

Keidar served in the Teleprocessing Corps of the Israel Defense Forces. During the Six Day War she was paralyzed in both her legs and restricted to a wheelchair.

Keidar won the silver medal in the 1987 Stoke Mandeville Games.

At the 1988 Summer Paralympics she competed in shooting and took part in three tournaments: Keidar won the silver medal in women's Air Rifle Kneeling for disability classifications 2–6, finished tenth in women's Air Rifle Prone 2-6 and ranked 14th in women's Air Rifle 3 Positions 2–6.

Keidar lived in Ramat Hasharon and was a mother of three.
