= Tim Jeffery =

British sport shooter (born 1996)

Personal information
- Born: 9 April 1996 (age 30) Newbury, England

Sport
- Country: Great Britain
- Sport: Shooting para sport
- Disability class: SH2
Medal record
Shooting para sport
Representing United Kingdom
Paralympic Games
Bronze medal – third place	2024 Paris	Mixed 50 m rifle prone SH2

Tim Jeffery (born 9 April 1996) is a British Paralympic shooter. He won the bronze medal in the R9 Mixed 50 metre rifle prone SH2 event at the 2024 Summer Paralympics in Paris, France. He also competed at the 2016 Summer Paralympics in Rio de Janeiro, Brazil and the 2020 Summer Paralympics in Tokyo, Japan.

In 2015, he qualified for the 2016 Summer Paralympics at the IPC Shooting World Cup event held in Sydney, Australia.
