= Manuela Schmermund =

German Paralympic sport shooter

Personal information
- Nationality: German
- Born: 30 December 1971 (age 54) Niederaula, Germany

Sport
- Country: Germany
- Sport: Paralympic shooting
Medal record
Paralympic Games
Gold medal – first place	2004 Athens	10 metre air rifle standing SH1
Silver medal – second place	2008 Beijing	10 metre air rifle standing SH1
Silver medal – second place	2012 London	10 metre air rifle standing SH1
Bronze medal – third place	2004 Athens	50 metre rifle 3 positions SH1

Manuela Schmermund (born 30 December 1971) is a German Paralympic sport shooter.

Schmermund has paraplegia which was caused by damage to her spinal cord in a car accident in 1992. She competes in SH1 classification events.

She has competed at the Paralympic Games in 2000; in 2004, where she won a gold medal in the 10 metre air rifle standing SH1 event and a bronze medal in the 50 metre rifle 3 positions SH1 event; in 2008, where she won a silver medal in the 10 metre air rifle standing SH1 event; in 2012, where she won a silver medal in the 10 metre air rifle standing SH1 event; and in 2016.
