= Heather Kuttai =

Canadian paralympic shooter

Personal information
- National team: Canada
- Born: 1969 or 1970 (age 55–56) North Battleford, Saskatchewan, Canada
- Education: University of Saskatchewan
- Spouse: Darrell Seib

Sport
- Country: Canada
- Sport: Paralympic shooting
- Disability: Paraplegia
- Disability class: SH3
Medal record
Women's Paralympic shooting
Representing Canada
Paralympic Games
Silver medal – second place	1988 Seoul	Women's air pistol 2–6
Silver medal – second place	1988 Seoul	Mixed air pistol team open
Bronze medal – third place	1992 Barcelona	Mixed air pistol SH1–3

Heather Kuttai (born either 1969 or 1970) is a Canadian SH3-classified Paralympic shooter who competed in the Paralympic Games. She won two silver medals in each of the women's air pistol 2–6 and the mixed air pistol team open competitions at the 1988 Summer Paralympics in Seoul, and a bronze medal in the mixed air pistol SH1–3 event at the 1992 Summer Paralympics in Barcelona. Kuttai is a 2009 inductee of the Saskatchewan Sports Hall of Fame.

From 2014 until 2023, Kuttai served as a commissioner with the Saskatchewan Human Rights Commission.

== Personal background ==
Kuttai was born in either 1969 or 1970, and was raised in North Battleford, Saskatchewan. When she was six years old, she was involved in an automobile accident and was rendered a paraplegic as a result of sustaining a spinal cord injury which has caused her to use a wheelchair. Kuttai is a graduate of the University of Saskatchewan with a Bachelor of Arts degree she earned in 1994 and a Master of Science degree she obtained in 2009. She is married to Darrell Seib, and has two children.

== Paralympic shooting ==
Her father introduced her to sport, and she took up paralympic shooting when she was aged 15. Kuttai won the 1985 Junior Women shooting competition at that year's North Battleford Target Shooting Competition, followed by her coming second at the Provincial Target Shooting Championships in each of 1986 and 1987. She joined the Canadian national wheelchair trapshooting squad in 1987. At the 1988 Summer Paralympics in Seoul, South Korea, Kuttai was one of six athletes at the Games to come from Saskatchewan. She won silver medals in each of the women's air pistol 2–6 and the mixed air pistol team open competitions. Kuttai also competed in each of the women's air rifle kneeling 2–6, the women's air rifle prone 2–6, women's air rifle 3 positions 2–6 and the women's air rifle standing 2–6 tournaments but she failed to win a medal in any of those events.

In July 1990, she participated in the World Championships and Games for the Disabled held in Assen in the Netherlands. Kuttai finished in second position at her event in the championships, and attained the same ranking at the Air Pistol competition. The following year, she was one of six athletes from Saskatchewan to partake in the 1991 World Stoke Mandeville Wheelchair Games in Aylesbury, England. During the 1992 Summer Paralympics in Barcelona, Spain, Kuttai won the bronze medal in the mixed air pistol SH1–3 competition, with a points score of 94.1. She also took part in each of the mixed air rifle 3 x 40 SH3; mixed Olympic match SH3; mixed free pistol SH1–3 and the mixed air rifle standing SH1–3 events without winning any further medals. Kuttai won the air rifle category at the 2001 and the 2004 National Target Shooting Championships. She also partook in each of the 2001 European Target Shooting Championships, the 2002 World Target Shooting Championships, the 2003 International Maple Leaf, and the 2003 International Air Gun Grand Prix.

== Post-retirement career ==
She retired from competitive sport in 2005 and became a coaching and training program developer for wheelchair athletes in target shooting. Kuttai has given coaching support to wheelchair athletes doing other forms of sport. She managed the 2003 Canada Games teams of Saskatchewan in both air pistol and air rifle as the sole wheelchair-using coach. Kuttai was employed by the University of Saskatchewan to lead the formation of its Disability Service for Students unit and Student Central services advocating disabled students during their studies at the university. She published the book Maternity Rolls on her life as a disabled woman and mother. In 2010, Kuttai raised money for children charities by doing the annual Drop Zone event descending from a 22-storey building to the ground by harness.

In 2014, Kurrai was appointed as a commissioner on the Saskatchewan Human Rights Commission. She resigned in October 2023 after the Saskatchewan Party government under Premier Scott Moe invoked the notwithstanding clause for their "Parents' Bill of Rights". The bill mandates teachers to get parental permission before using the preferred name and preferred gender pronoun of students under the age of 16; Kurrai described the bill as "an attack on the rights of trans, nonbinary, and gender diverse children." After her resignation, interim commissioner Brian Wilcox stated that it took "true strength and determination to take such definitive action", and that Kuttai and her family were "true champions for human rights in Saskatchewan".

== Award ==
In 1987, she was named one of six Saskatchewan Junior Citizens of the Year. Kuttai was named the 1988 Sask Sport Athlete of the Year for her role in the Canadian Paralympic squad. Four years later, she was named to that September's Sask Sport Team of the Month for being one of five athletes from Saskatchewan to win medals at that year's Paralympic Games. Kuttai was named the recipient of the 2001 Excellence in Service to Students with Disabilities by the Canadian Association of Disabilities Providers of Post-Secondary Education and the 2002 U of S President's Service Award by the University of Saskatchewan. She was inducted into the Saskatchewan Hall of Fame in 2009, and was the 2021 winner of the USask Lifetime Achievement Award "for an outstanding lifetime of accomplishments and contributions to the social, cultural and economic well-being of society."
