= Mariella Bertini =

Italian wheelchair fencer (born 1958)

Personal information
- National team: Italy
- Born: 30 September 1958 (age 67) Pontedera, Italy
- Spouse: Santo Mangano

Sport
- Sport: Wheelchair fencing
- Club: ASHA Pisa
Medal record
Event	1st	2nd	3rd
Paralympic Games	3	5	0

Mariella Bertini (born 30 September 1958) is a former Italian wheelchair fencer who won eight medals at the Summer Paralympics.

Married to wheelchair fencer and para shooter Santo Mangano, he too, like her, winner of eight Paralympic medals between Seoul 1988 and Atlanta 1996.

== See also ==
- Italian multiple medallists at the Summer Paralympics
