= Shooting at the 1996 Summer Paralympics =

Paralympic sporting event

Shooting at the X Paralympic Games
- Paralympic Shooting
- Competitors: 133 from 32 nations

Paralympic symbol (1994-2004)

Shooting at the 1996 Summer Paralympics consisted of 15 events.

== Medal table ==
Rank	Nation	Gold	Silver	Bronze	Total
1	Sweden (SWE)	5	2	3	10
2	South Korea (KOR)	3	0	1	4
3	Russia (RUS)	2	0	1	3
4	Germany (GER)	1	1	5	7
5	Great Britain (GBR)	1	1	0	2
5	Yugoslavia (YUG)	1	1	0	2
7	Iran (IRI)	1	0	0	1
7	Spain (ESP)	1	0	0	1
9	Denmark (DEN)	0	2	0	2
9	Israel (ISR)	0	2	0	2
11	Italy (ITA)	0	1	4	5
12	Australia (AUS)	0	1	0	1
12	Austria (AUT)	0	1	0	1
12	China (CHN)	0	1	0	1
12	France (FRA)	0	1	0	1
12	Slovenia (SLO)	0	1	0	1
17	South Africa (RSA)	0	0	1	1
Totals (17 entries)		15	15	15	45

=== Participating nations ===
- Australia (7)
- Austria (5)
- Belgium (3)
- Canada (5)
- China (2)
- Chinese Taipei (1)
- Denmark (6)
- Estonia (1)
- Finland (6)
- France (7)
- Germany (13)
- Great Britain (9)
- Hong Kong (1)
- India (1)
- Iran (5)
- Israel (4)
- Italy (6)
- Macedonia (1)
- Netherlands (1)
- New Zealand (1)
- Norway (1)
- Puerto Rico (3)
- Russia (4)
- Slovenia (3)
- South Africa (2)
- South Korea (6)
- Spain (5)
- Sweden (7)
- Switzerland (5)
- United States (6)
- Venezuela (1)
- Yugoslavia (5)

== Medal summary ==
Event	Gold	Silver	Bronze
Men's air pistol SH1	Andrey Lebedinsky; Russia	Hubert Aufschnaiter; Austria	Antonio Martella; Italy
Women's air pistol SH1	Ruzica Aleksov; Yugoslavia	Lone Overbye; Denmark	Rosabelle Riese; South Africa
Mixed free pistol .22 SH1	Francisco Angel Soriano; Spain	Ruzica Aleksov; Yugoslavia	Andrey Lebedinsky; Russia
Mixed sport pistol SH1	Andrey Lebedinsky; Russia	James Nomarhas; Australia	Roland Hartmann; Germany
Men's air rifle 3×40 SH1	Jonas Jacobsson; Sweden	Josef Neumaier; Germany	Alfred Berniger; Germany
Women's air rifle 3×20 SH1	Im Yeon Kim; South Korea	Deanna Coates; Great Britain	Sabine Brogle; Germany
Mixed air rifle 3×40 SH2	Thomas Johansson; Sweden	Lotta Helsinger; Sweden	Santo Mangano; Italy
Men's air rifle standing SH1	Tae Ho Han; South Korea	Franc Pinter; Slovenia	Franz Falke; Germany
Women's air rifle standing SH1	Deanna Coates; Great Britain	Nan Zhang; China	Im Yeon Kim; South Korea
Mixed air rifle standing SH2	Thomas Johansson; Sweden	Santo Mangano; Italy	Lotta Helsinger; Sweden
Mixed air rifle prone SH1	Enayatollah Bokharaei; Iran	Kazimierz Mechula; Denmark	Jonas Jacobsson; Sweden
Mixed air rifle prone SH2	Thomas Johansson; Sweden	Lotta Helsinger; Sweden	Santo Mangano; Italy
Men's free rifle 3×40 SH1	Josef Neumaier; Germany	Doron Shaziri; Israel	Bjorn Samuelsson; Sweden
Women's standard rifle 3×20 SH1	Im Yeon Kim; South Korea	Michele Amiel; France	Sabine Brogle; Germany
Mixed English match SH1	Jonas Jacobsson; Sweden	Doron Shaziri; Israel	Oscar De Pellegrin; Italy
