= Vasyl Kovalchuk =

Ukrainian Paralympic sports shooter

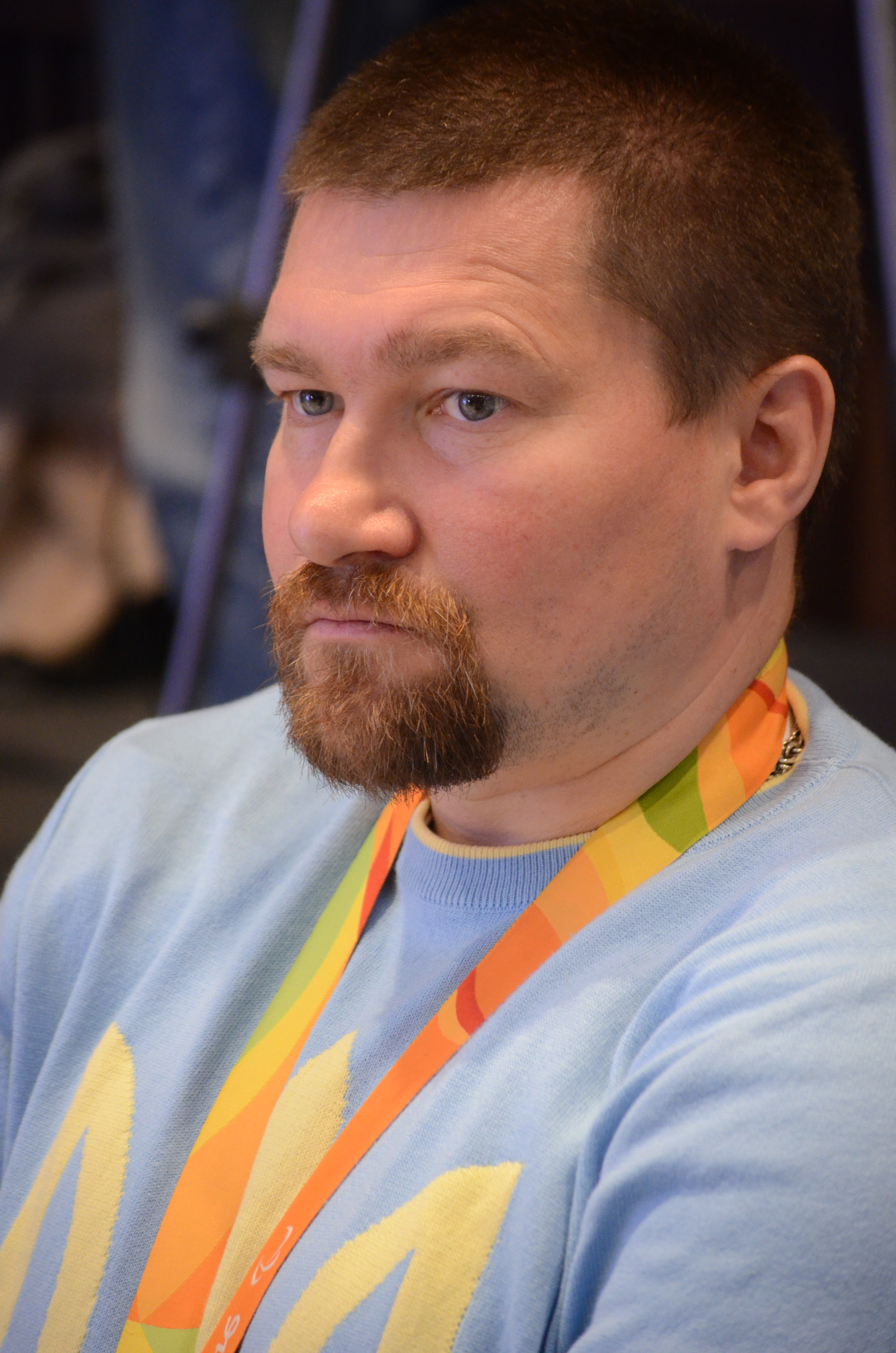
- Kovalchuk in 2016

Personal information
- Born: April 18, 1973 (age 53)

Sport
- Country: Ukraine
Medal record
Shooting para sport
Representing Ukraine
Paralympic Games
Gold medal – first place	2012 London	Mixed 10m air rifle prone SH2
Gold medal – first place	2016 Rio	Mixed 10m air rifle prone SH2
European Para Championships
Silver medal – second place	2023 Rotterdam	Mixed 10 m air rifle prone SH2

Vasyl Kovalchuk (born April 18, 1973) is a Ukrainian sports-shooter. He won gold medals at both the 2012 and 2016 Summer Paralympics in the mixed 10 metre air rifle prone SH2. He also competed in both events in the mixed 10 metre air rifle standing SH2 competitions.
