= Shooting at the 1988 Summer Paralympics =

Shooting at the VIII Paralympic Games
- Paralympic Shooting

Paralympic symbol (1988-1994)

Shooting at the 1988 Summer Paralympics consisted of 23 events. Because of a three-way tie for third place in the men's air rifle three positions 2-6 event, a total of 25 bronze medals were awarded.

== Medal table ==
Rank	Nation	Gold	Silver	Bronze	Total
1	South Korea (KOR)	6	4	1	11
2	Italy (ITA)	4	1	0	5
3	West Germany (FRG)	3	3	2	8
4	Australia (AUS)	3	1	0	4
5	Sweden (SWE)	2	0	5	7
6	Belgium (BEL)	1	3	0	4
7	Great Britain (GBR)	1	1	3	5
8	Austria (AUT)	1	1	0	2
8	Denmark (DEN)	1	1	0	2
10	China (CHN)	1	0	0	1
11	Netherlands (NED)	0	2	4	6
12	Canada (CAN)	0	2	2	4
13	Israel (ISR)	0	2	0	2
14	France (FRA)	0	1	4	5
15	Yugoslavia (YUG)	0	1	0	1
16	Finland (FIN)	0	0	3	3
17	Hong Kong (HKG)	0	0	1	1
Totals (17 entries)		23	23	25	71

== Medal summary ==
=== Men's events ===
Event	Gold	Silver	Bronze
Air pistol 2–6	Gabriele Celegato; Italy	Hubert Aufschnaiter; Austria	Aulis Rinne; Finland
Air pistol sitting LSH1	Jae Hwan Baek; South Korea	Jung Don Lee; South Korea	Freed Hazewinkel; Netherlands
Air pistol standing LSH2	Young Soo Kang; South Korea	Guy Dumarquez; France	Jan van den Meerendonk; Netherlands
Air rifle 2 positions with aids 1A–1C	Santo Mangano; Italy	Mario Dorigo; Belgium	Adam Salamandyk; Canada
Air rifle 3 positions 2–6	Anders Lundvall; Sweden	Franz Falke; West Germany	Serge Pittard; France
Air rifle 3 positions 2–6	Anders Lundvall; Sweden	Franz Falke; West Germany	Eef Tammel; Netherlands
Air rifle 3 positions 2–6	Anders Lundvall; Sweden	Franz Falke; West Germany	Wolfgang Hess; West Germany
Air rifle kneeling 2–6	Jung Hun Song; South Korea	Franz Falke; West Germany	Byung Joon Yu; South Korea
Air rifle kneeling with aids 1A–1C	Santo Mangano; Italy	Mario Dorigo; Belgium	Adam Salamandyk; Canada
Air rifle prone with aids 1A–1C	Santo Mangano; Italy	Mario Dorigo; Belgium	Erling Fredriksson; Sweden
Air rifle sitting LSH1	Kyu Hyun Bae; South Korea	Keith Morriss; Great Britain	Kusti Korkeasalo; Finland
Air rifle standing 2–6	Wolfgang Hess; West Germany	Eef Tammel; Netherlands	Anders Lundvall; Sweden
Air rifle standing LSH2	Jin Dong Jung; South Korea	Doron Asher; Israel	Reino Landstedt; Finland

=== Women's events ===
Event	Gold	Silver	Bronze
Air pistol 2–6	Wei Zhang; China	Heather Kuttai; Canada	Isabel Barr; Great Britain
Air pistol standing LSH2	Sonia Vettenburg; Belgium	Ruzica Aleksov; Yugoslavia	Marie Therese Pichon; France
Air rifle 3 positions 2–6	Libby Kosmala; Australia	Merita Pedersen; Denmark	Loraine Schulz; West Germany
Air rifle kneeling 2–6	Libby Kosmala; Australia	Ruth Keidar; Israel	Shui Mai Leung; Hong Kong
Air rifle prone 2–6	Libby Kosmala; Australia	Rita Pieri; Italy	Gill Middleton; Great Britain
Air rifle standing 2–6	Deanna Coates; Great Britain	Libby Kosmala; Australia	Middleton Gill; Great Britain

=== Mixed events ===
Event	Gold	Silver	Bronze
Air pistol team open	Austria (AUT); Hubert Aufschnaiter; Oskar Kreuzer; Werner Mueller	Canada (CAN); Bernard Gehring; Heather Kuttai; Richard Schell	France (FRA); Marie Chantel Barberaud; Pierre Guivarch; Philippe Michoux
Air rifle 3 positions team 2–6	West Germany (FRG); Franz Falke; Wolfgang Hess; Loraine Schulz	South Korea (KOR); Kwang Woon Cha; Jung Hun Song; Byung Joon Yu	Sweden (SWE); Jan Gadd; Jonas Jacobsson; Anders Lundvall
Air rifle kneeling team 2–6	South Korea (KOR); Kwang Woon Cha; Jung Hun Song; Byung Joon Yu	West Germany (FRG); Franz Falke; Wolfgang Hess; Loraine Schulz	Netherlands (NED); Eef Tammel; Ton de Haas; Jan van de Wetering
Air rifle prone 2–6	Kazimierz Mechula; Denmark	Kwang Woon Cha; South Korea	Anders Lundvall; Sweden
Air rifle prone team 2–6	Sweden (SWE); Jan Gadd; Jonas Jacobsson; Anders Lundvall	South Korea (KOR); Kwang Woon Cha; Jung Hun Song; Byung Joon Yu	France (FRA); Michel Pelon; Nicole Petit; Serge Pittard
Air rifle standing team 2–6	West Germany (FRG); Franz Falke; Wolfgang Hess; Loraine Schulz	Netherlands (NED); Eef Tammel; Ton de Haas; Jan van de Wetering	Sweden (SWE); Jan Gadd; Jonas Jacobsson; Anders Lundvall
