= Sweden at the 1996 Summer Paralympics =

- IPC code: SWE
- NPC: Swedish Parasports Federation

in Atlanta
- Competitors: 111 (84 men and 27 women)
- Flag bearer: Bengt Lindberg
- Medals: Gold 12 Silver 14 Bronze 11 Total 37

Summer Paralympics appearances (overview)
- 1960; 1964; 1968; 1972; 1976; 1980; 1984; 1988; 1992; 1996; 2000; 2004; 2008; 2012; 2016; 2020; 2024

111 athletes (84 men and 27 women) from Sweden competed at the 1996 Summer Paralympics in Atlanta, United States.

== Medallist table ==
| Medal | Name | Sport | Event |
|---|---|---|---|
| Gold | Per Vesterlund | Athletics | 1500m T51 |
| Gold | Jonas Jacobsson | Shooting | Men's air rifle 3x40 SH1 |
| Gold | Thomas Jacobsson | Shooting | Mixed air rifle 3x40 SH2 |
| Gold | Thomas Jacobsson | Shooting | Mixed air rifle standing SH2 |
| Gold | Thomas Jacobsson | Shooting | Mixed air rifle prone SH2 |
| Gold | Jonas Jacobsson | Shooting | Mixed English match SH1 |
| Gold | Petter Edstrom | Swimming | Men's 100m freestyle S3 |
| Gold | Petter Edstrom | Swimming | Men's 150m medley SM3 |
| Gold | Eila Nilsson | Swimming | Women's 50m freestyle B1 |
| Gold | Eila Nilsson | Swimming | Women's 100m freestyle B1 |
| Gold | Magnus Andree | Table tennis | Men's singles 8 |
| Gold | Ernst Bolldén; Patrik Högstedt; Jörgen Johansson; Jan-Krister Gustavsson | Table tennis | Men's teams 4–5 |
| Silver | Gunnar Krantz | Athletics | 100m T33 |
| Silver | Håkan Eriksson | Athletics | 100m T53 |
| Silver | Håkan Eriksson | Athletics | 200m T53 |
| Silver | Gunnar Krantz | Athletics | 400m T32-33 |
| Silver | Tim Johansson | Athletics | 400m T50 |
| Silver | Lotta Helsinger | Shooting | Mixed air rifle 3x40 SH2 |
| Silver | Lotta Helsinger | Shooting | Mixed air rifle prone SH2 |
| Silver | Tomas Kjellqvist | Swimming | Men's 100m breaststroke SB10 |
| Silver | Petter Edstrom | Swimming | Men's 200m freestyle S3 |
| Silver | Simon Ahlstad | Swimming | Men's 200m medley SM7 |
| Silver | Sara Olofsson | Swimming | Women's 100m breaststroke SB4 |
| Silver | Mattias Karlsson | Table tennis | Men's singles 6 |
| Silver | Robert Bader | Table tennis | Men's singles 10 |
| Silver | Thomas Larsson; Magnus Andree; Mikael Vestling | Table tennis | Men's team 6–8 |
| Bronze | Per Vesterlund | Athletics | 800m T51 |
| Bronze | Tim Johansson | Athletics | 1500m T50 |
| Bronze | Tim Johansson | Athletics | Marathon T50 |
| Bronze | Sarah Rydh | Equestrian | Dressage grade I |
| Bronze | Lotta Helsinger | Shooting | Mixed air rifle standing SH2 |
| Bronze | Jonas Jacobsson | Shooting | Mixed air rifle prone SH1 |
| Bronze | Bjorn Samuelsson | Shooting | Men's free rifle 3x40 SH1 |
| Bronze | Petter Edstrom | Swimming | Men's 50m backstroke S3 |
| Bronze | Petter Edstrom | Swimming | Men's 50m freestyle S3 |
| Bronze | Maria Vikgren | Swimming | Women's 100m breaststroke SB4 |
| Bronze | Ernst Bolldén | Table tennis | Men's singles 5 |

== See also ==
- Sweden at the Paralympics
- Sweden at the 1996 Summer Olympics
