= Joel Guillon =

French Paralympic shooter

Medal record

Men's shooting para sport

Representing France

Paralympic Games
Gold medal – first place	1980 Arnhem	Air Pistol Amputee
Silver medal – second place	1984 New York / Stoke Mandeville	Air Pistol Integrated

Joel Guillon is a paralympic shooter from France. He has competed in three consecutive games where he won a gold medal in 1980 and silver in 1984. In his third games in 1988 he finished in eighth place.
