= West Brownlow =

American paralympic archer, athlete and sport shooter

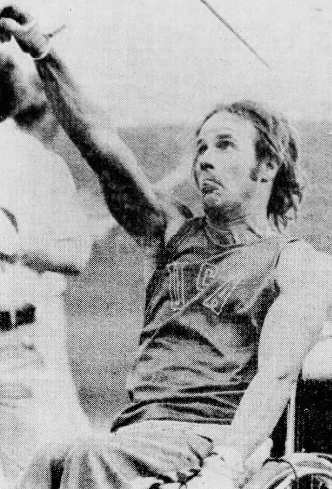
- Brownlow in 1976

Personal information
- Born: George West Brownlow III; February 27, 1945 New York, U.S.
- Died: September 11, 2001 (aged 56)

Sport
- Country: United States
- Sport: Archery; Para-athletics; Paralympic shooting
Medal record
Representing United States
Paralympic Games
Archery
Gold medal – first place	1976 Toronto	Men's short metric round tetraplegic A-C
Para-athletics
Silver medal – second place	1976 Toronto	Men's 60 m 1C
Paralympic shooting
Bronze medal – third place	1984 Stoke Mandeville / New York	Men's air pistol 1A-1C
Bronze medal – third place	1984 Stoke Mandeville / New York	Men's air rifle kneeling 1A-1C

George West Brownlow III (February 27, 1945 – September 11, 2001) was an American paralympic archer, athlete and sport shooter. He competed at the 1976, 1980 and 1984 Summer Paralympics.

== Life and career ==
Brownlow was born in New York, the son of George Sr. and Anita Brownlow. He attended and graduated from Chenango Valley High School. After graduating, he worked as a ski instructor.

Brownlow competed at the 1976 Summer Paralympics, winning the gold and silver medal in archery and athletics. He then competed at the 1984 Summer Paralympics, winning two bronze medals in shooting.

== Death ==
Brownlow died on September 11, 2001, at the age of 56.
