= Sonia Vettenburg =

Belgian sports shooter

Personal information
- Nationality: Belgian
- Born: 12 November 1954 (age 70); Aalst, Belgium

Sport
- Sport: Sports shooting

Sonia Vettenburg (born 12 November 1954) is a Belgian sports shooter. She competed in the women's 10 metre air pistol event at the 1992 Summer Olympics. Vettenburg, who is a wheelchair user, also competed at the 1984 Summer Paralympics and the 1988 Summer Paralympics.

== See also ==
- List of athletes who have competed in the Paralympics and Olympics
