= Dave Tarrant =

New Zealand Paralympian (died 2018)

Personal information
- Full name: David Tarrant
- Died: 2018 (aged 82 or 83)

Sport
- Country: New Zealand
- Sport: Shooting
Medal record
Men's shooting para sport
Representing New Zealand
Paralympic Games
Bronze medal – third place	1980 Arnhem	Mixed Air Pistol 2-5

David Tarrant (1935/1936 – 2018) was a New Zealand Paralympian who competed in sport shooting.

Tarrant lived in Christchurch. At the age of 31, a fall from a tree left him a paraplegic. He set up a shooting range across his living room with the target hooked into the stairs. At the Australian national paraplegic games in 1979 he won a gold medal and set a world record in the air pistol event with a score of 363 out of a possible 400. At the 1980 Summer Paralympics in Arnhem, he won a bronze medal in the Mixed Air Pistol 2-5 event. He died in 2018.
