= Santo Mangano =

Italian Paralympic shooter

Personal information
- National team: Italy
- Born: 28 August 1951 (age 74) Castelmola, Italy
- Spouse: Mariella Bertini

Sport
- Sport: Para shooting Wheelchair fencing
- Disability: Intellectual disability
- Disability class: SH2
- Club: ASHA Pisa
Medal record
| Event | 1st | 2nd | 3rd |
|---|---|---|---|
| Paralympic Games | 5 | 1 | 2 |
| World cahampionships | 1 | 0 | 0 |
| Total | 6 | 1 | 2 |
Paralympic shooting
Representing Italy
World cahampionships
| Gold medal – first place | 1994 Linz | Air rifle |

Santo Mangano (born 28 August 1951) is a former Italian paralympic shooter and before a wheelchair fencer who won eight medals at the Summer Paralympics.

Married to wheelchair fencer Mariella Bertini, she too, like him, winner of eight Paralympic medals between Seoul 1988 and Atlanta 1996.

== Achievements ==
| Year | Competition | Venue | Rank | Event |
|---|---|---|---|---|
Wheelchair fencing
| 1984 | Summer Paralympics | (United Kingdom) Stoke Mandeville | 1st | Foil individual 1B |
Shooting
| 1988 | Summer Paralympics | (South Korea) Seoul | 1st | Air rifle 2 positions with aids 1A–1C |
| 1988 | Summer Paralympics | (South Korea) Seoul | 1st | Air rifle kneeling with aids 1A–1C |
| 1988 | Summer Paralympics | (South Korea) Seoul | 1st | Air rifle prone with aids 1A–1C |
| 1992 | Summer Paralympics | (Spain) Barcelona | 1st | Mixed air rifle 3×40 SH4 |
| 1996 | Summer Paralympics | (United States) Atlanta | 2nd | Mixed air rifle standing SH2 |
| 1996 | Summer Paralympics | (United States) Atlanta | 3rd | Mixed air rifle 3×40 SH2 |
| 1996 | Summer Paralympics | (United States) Atlanta | 3rd | Mixed air rifle prone SH2 |

== See also ==
- Italian multiple medallists at the Summer Paralympics
