= Shooting at the 1992 Summer Paralympics =

Shooting at the IX Paralympic Games
- Paralympic Shooting

Paralympic symbol (1988-1994)

Shooting at the 1992 Summer Paralympics consisted of 16 events.

== Medal summary ==
Event	Gold	Silver	Bronze
Men's air pistol SH1	Branimir Jovanovski; Independent Paralympic Participants	Radomir Rakonjac; Independent Paralympic Participants	Young Soo Kang; South Korea
Men's air pistol SH2	Pierre Guivarch; France	Jae Hwan Paik; South Korea	Philippe Michoux; France
Men's air rifle standing SH1	Aloys Schneider; Germany	Jin Dong Jung; South Korea	Robert Cooper; Great Britain
Men's air rifle standing SH2	Jonas Jacobsson; Sweden	Johann Brunner; Germany	Serge Pittard; France
Mixed air pistol SH1–3	Ruzica Aleksov; Independent Paralympic Participants	Lone Overbye; Denmark	Heather Kuttai; Canada
Mixed air rifle 3×40 SH2	Johann Brunner; Germany	Anders Lundvall; Sweden	Jonas Jacobsson; Sweden
Mixed air rifle 3×40 SH3	Siegmar Henker; Germany	Kazimierz Mechula; Denmark	Joo Sik Lee; South Korea
Mixed air rifle 3×40 SH4	Santo Mangano; Italy	Charlotte Streton; Denmark	Kevin John Hyde; Great Britain
Mixed air rifle standing SH1–3	Deanna Coates; Great Britain	Im Yeon Kim; South Korea	Siegmar Henker; Germany
Mixed English Match SH1–3	Aloys Schneider; Germany	Jin Dong Jung; South Korea	John Campbell; Great Britain
Mixed free pistol SH1–3	Laszlo Decsi; Canada	Jae Hwan Paik; South Korea	Jan Boonen; Belgium
Mixed Olympic Match SH2	Jonas Jacobsson; Sweden	Johann Brunner; Germany	Reino Landstedt; Finland
Mixed Olympic Match SH3	Siegmar Henker; Germany	Kazimierz Mechula; Denmark	Oscar De Pellegrin; Italy
Mixed Olympic Match SH4	Charlotte Streton; Denmark	Jan Kristensen; Denmark	Anja Nurmi; Finland
Mixed SB free rifle 3×40 SH1–2	Im Yeon Kim; South Korea	Johann Brunner; Germany	Aloys Schneider; Germany
Mixed sport pistol SH1–3	Jan Boonen; Belgium	Luis Salgado; Spain	Hubert Aufschnaiter; Austria

=== Medal table ===
Rank	Nation	Gold	Silver	Bronze	Total
1	Germany (GER)	5	3	2	10
2	Sweden (SWE)	2	1	1	4
3	Independent Paralympic Participants (IPP)	2	1	0	3
4	South Korea (KOR)	1	5	2	8
5	Denmark (DEN)	1	5	0	6
6	Great Britain (GBR)	1	0	3	4
7	France (FRA)	1	0	2	3
8	Belgium (BEL)	1	0	1	2
8	Canada (CAN)	1	0	1	2
8	Italy (ITA)	1	0	1	2
11	Spain (ESP)	0	1	0	1
12	Finland (FIN)	0	0	2	2
13	Austria (AUT)	0	0	1	1
Totals (13 entries)		16	16	16	48
