= Sweden at the 1992 Summer Paralympics =

- IPC code: SWE
- NPC: Swedish Parasports Federation

in Barcelona
- Competitors: 99
- Flag bearer: Marie-Louise Andersson
- Medals Ranked 9th: Gold 16 Silver 33 Bronze 19 Total 68

Summer Paralympics appearances (overview)
- 1960; 1964; 1968; 1972; 1976; 1980; 1984; 1988; 1992; 1996; 2000; 2004; 2008; 2012; 2016; 2020; 2024

Sweden competed at the 1992 Summer Paralympics in Barcelona and Madrid, Spain. Competitors from Sweden won 68 medals including 16 gold, 33 silver and 19 bronze and finished 18th in the medal table.

== See also ==
- Sweden at the Paralympics
- Sweden at the 1992 Summer Olympics
