= Sabine Brogle =

German paralympic air rifle athlete

Personal information
- Born: 3 May 1965 (age 61) Ettenheim, West Germany

Sport
- Country: Germany
- Sport: Shooting para sport
Medal record
Shooting para sport
Representing Germany
Paralympic Games
| Silver medal – second place | 2000 Sydney | Air rifle standing SH1 |
| Silver medal – second place | 2000 Sydney | Sport rifle 3x20m SH1 |
| Bronze medal – third place | 1996 Atlanta | Air rifle 3x20m SH1 |
| Bronze medal – third place | 1996 Atlanta | Standard rifle 3x20m SH1 |
| Bronze medal – third place | 2004 Athens | Air rifle standing SH1 |

Sabine Brogle (born 3 May 1965) is a German paralympic air rifle athlete. She competed at the in 1996, 2000, 2004 and 2008 Summer Paralympics. She won two silver medals and three bronze.

== Career ==
At the 1996 Summer Paralympics in Atlanta, she won a bronze medal in Women's Air Rifle 3x20 SH1, and in Women's Standard Rifle 3x20 SH1.

At the 2000 Summer Paralympics in Sydney, she won a silver medal in Women's Sport Rifle 3x20 SH1, and in Women's Air Rifle Standing SH1.

At the 2004 Summer Paralympics in Athens, she won a bronze medal in Women's 10 metre air rifle standing SH1. She competed in Women's Sport Rifle 3x20 SH1.

At the 2008 Summer Paralympics, she competed in Women's Sport Rifle 3x20 SH1, and Women's Air Rifle Standing SH1.

She could not compete in 2016 due to a shoulder injury.

She trains with BSG Offenburg; her coach is Rudi Krenn.
