= Shooting at the 1984 Summer Paralympics =

Shooting at the VII Paralympic Games
- Paralympic Shooting

Paralympic symbol (1988-1994)

Shooting at the 1984 Summer Paralympics consisted of 29 events.

== Medal summary ==
=== Men's events ===
Event	Gold	Silver	Bronze
Air pistol 1A-1C	Siegmar Henker; West Germany	Gregor Bonderud; Sweden	West Brownlow; United States
Air pistol 2-6	Oskar Kreuzer; Austria	Ernst Eriksen; Denmark	Aulis Rinne; Finland
Air pistol integrated	Simo Kecman; Yugoslavia	Joel Guillon; France	Guy Dunarquez; France
Air rifle 3 positions 2-6	Eef Tammel; Netherlands	Franz Falke; West Germany	Jonas Jacobsson; Sweden
Air rifle 3 positions team 1A-6	Netherlands (NED)	Sweden (SWE)	West Germany (FRG)
Air rifle integrated	Antti Landstedt; Finland	Doron Asher; Israel	Nissim Filosof; Israel
Air rifle kneeling 1A-1C	Peter Haslam; Great Britain	Jan Kristensen; Denmark	West Brownlow; United States
Air rifle kneeling 2-6	Eef Tammel; Netherlands	Michel Pelon; France	Franz Falke; West Germany
Air rifle kneeling team 1A-6	Netherlands (NED)	Sweden (SWE)	France (FRA)
Air rifle prone 1A-1C	Siegmar Henker; West Germany	Peter Haslam; Great Britain	Jan Kristensen; Denmark
Air rifle prone 2-6	Roger Withrow; United States	Michel Pelon; France	Eef Tammel; Netherlands
Air rifle prone team 1A-6	France (FRA)	Netherlands (NED)	Sweden (SWE)
Air rifle standing 1A-1C	Siegmar Henker; West Germany	Jan Kristensen; Denmark	Peter Haslam; Great Britain
Air rifle standing 2-6	Eef Tammel; Netherlands	Jonas Jacobsson; Sweden	Franz Falke; West Germany
Air rifle standing team 1A-6	Sweden (SWE)	West Germany (FRG)	Netherlands (NED)
Pistol team 1A-6	Austria (AUT)	Great Britain (GBR)	West Germany (FRG)
Rifle prone - tetraplegic (aids) 1A-1C	Allan Chadwick; Australia	Andre Chevrier; Switzerland	Kuno Stieger; Switzerland

=== Women's events ===
Event	Gold	Silver	Bronze
Air pistol 1A-1C	Isabel Barr; Great Britain		
Air pistol 2-6	Nicolle Sarton; France	Marie Chantal Barberaud; France	
Air pistol integrated	Brigit Larsen; Denmark	Sonja Vettenburg; Belgium	Marie Therese Pichon; France
Air rifle 3 positions 2-6	Libby Kosmala; Australia	Nicole Petit; France	Deanna Coates; Great Britain
Air rifle integrated	Annie Lecointe; France	Anne Picot; Great Britain	Allison Smith; New Zealand
Air rifle kneeling 1A-1C	Barbara Caspers; Australia		
Air rifle kneeling 2-6	Libby Kosmala; Australia	Deanna Coates; Great Britain	Siegfried Battran; West Germany
Air rifle prone 1A-1C	Barbara Caspers; Australia		
Air rifle prone 2-6	Libby Kosmala; Australia	Nicole Petit; France	Siegfried Battran; West Germany
Air rifle standing 1A-1C	Barbara Caspers; Australia		
Air rifle standing 2-6	Libby Kosmala; Australia	Deanna Coates; Great Britain	Nicole Petit; France

=== Mixed events ===
Event	Gold	Silver	Bronze
Air rifle 3 positions 1A-1C	Barbara Caspers; Australia	Peter Haslam; Great Britain	
Air rifle 3 positions 1A-1C	Barbara Caspers; Australia	Jan Kristensen; Denmark	
