= Shooting at the 1976 Summer Paralympics =

Shooting at the V Paralympic Games
- Paralympic Shooting
- Venue: No. 2 Division Police Facilities

Shooting at the 1976 Summer Paralympics consisted of three rifle events. The competition was held at the No. 2 Division Police Facilities in Toronto, Ontario, Canada.

== Medal summary ==
Event	Gold	Silver	Bronze
Mixed rifle shooting 1A-1C	R. Thibodeau; Canada	Joyce Murland; Canada	Joseph Sharav; Israel
Mixed rifle shooting 2-5	Libby Richards; Australia	Martin Stadler; Switzerland	Yigal Tam; Israel
Mixed rifle shooting amputee	J. Byrns; Canada	Nissim Philossof; Israel	Gerhard Grinninger; Austria

== Medal table ==
* Host nation (Canada)

Rank	Nation	Gold	Silver	Bronze	Total
1	Canada*	2	1	0	3
2	Australia	1	0	0	1
3	Israel	0	1	2	3
4	Switzerland	0	1	0	1
5	Austria	0	0	1	1
Totals (5 entries)		3	3	3	9
