= Jonas Jacobsson =

Swedish Paralympic sport shooter

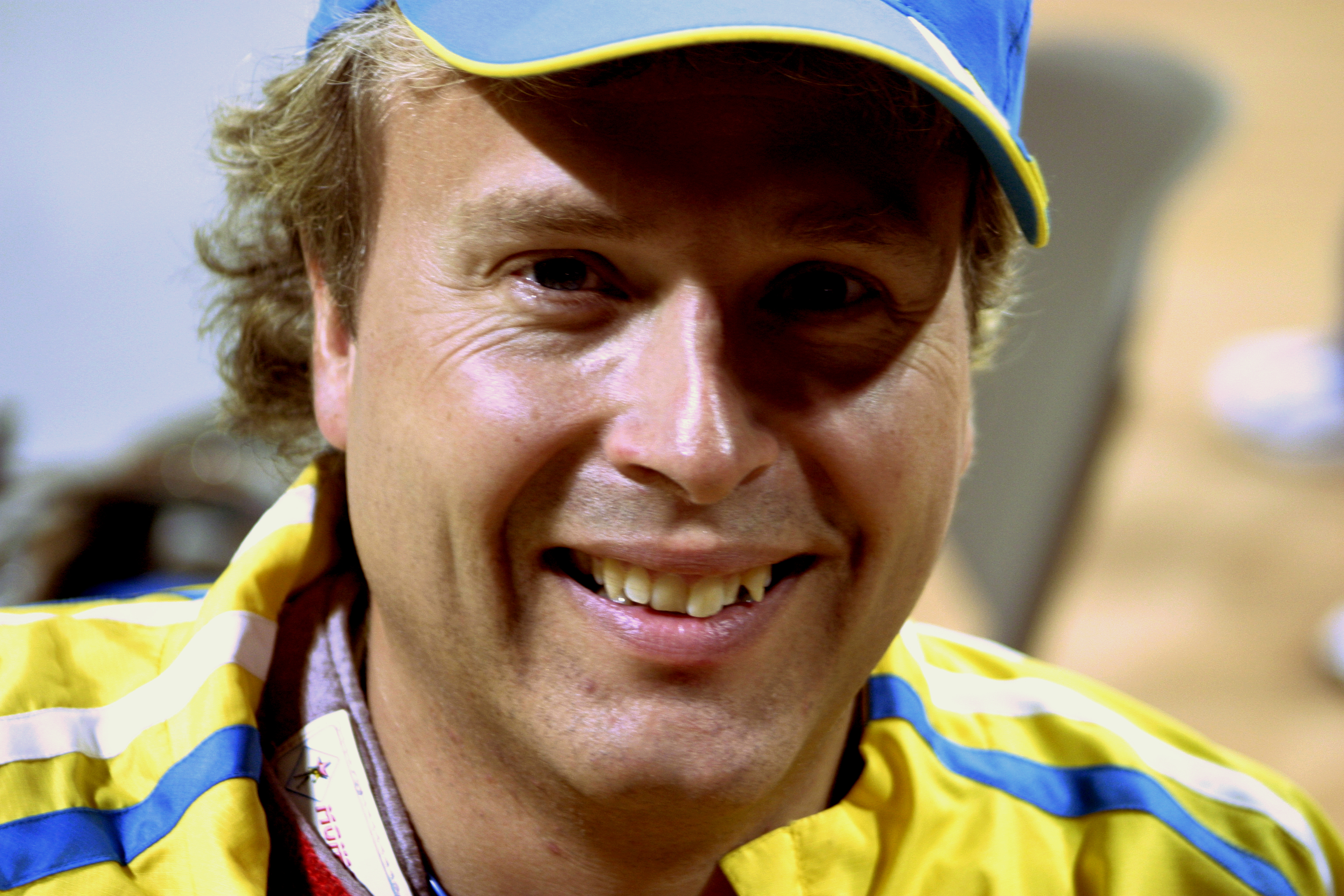

Personal information
- Nationality: Sweden
- Born: 22 June 1965 (age 61) Norrköping, Sweden
- Height: 1.70 m (5 ft 7 in)
- Weight: 51 kg (112 lb)

Sport
- Disability class: SH1, SH2
Medal record
Event / 1st / 2nd / 3rd; Paralympic Games / 17 / 4 / 9
Shooting para sport
Representing Sweden
Paralympic Games
Gold medal – first place	1980 Arnhem	Mixed air rifle standing 2-5
Gold medal – first place	1984 Stoke Mandeville & New York	Men's air rifle standing team 1A-6
Gold medal – first place	1988 Seoul	Mixed air rifle prone team 2-6
Gold medal – first place	1992 Barcelona	Men's air rifle standing SH2
Gold medal – first place	1992 Barcelona	Mixed Olympic Match SH2
Gold medal – first place	1996 Atlanta	Men's air rifle 3×40 SH1
Gold medal – first place	1996 Atlanta	Mixed English match SH1
Gold medal – first place	2000 Sydney	Men's free rifle 3×40 SH1
Gold medal – first place	2000 Sydney	Mixed free rifle prone SH1
Gold medal – first place	2004 Athens	Mixed air rifle prone SH1
Gold medal – first place	2004 Athens	Men's air rifle standing SH1
Gold medal – first place	2004 Athens	Men's free rifle 3x40 SH1
Gold medal – first place	2004 Athens	Mixed free rifle prone SH1
Gold medal – first place	2008 Beijing	Men's air rifle standing SH1
Gold medal – first place	2008 Beijing	Men's free rifle 3x40 SH1
Gold medal – first place	2008 Beijing	Mixed free rifle prone SH1
Gold medal – first place	2012 London	Men's free rifle 3x40 SH1
Silver medal – second place	1984 Stoke Mandeville & New York	Men's air rifle 3 positions team 1A-6
Silver medal – second place	1984 Stoke Mandeville & New York	Men's air rifle kneeling team 1A-6
Silver medal – second place	1984 Stoke Mandeville & New York	Men's air rifle standing 2-6
Silver medal – second place	2012 London	Men's air rifle standing SH1
Bronze medal – third place	1980 Arnhem	Mixed air rifle 3 positions 2-5
Bronze medal – third place	1984 Stoke Mandeville & New York	Men's air rifle 3 positions 2-6
Bronze medal – third place	1984 Stoke Mandeville & New York	Men's air rifle prone team 1A-6
Bronze medal – third place	1988 Seoul	Mixed air rifle 3 positions team 2-6
Bronze medal – third place	1988 Seoul	Mixed air rifle standing team 2-6
Bronze medal – third place	1992 Barcelona	Mixed air rifle 3×40 SH2
Bronze medal – third place	1996 Atlanta	Mixed air rifle prone SH1
Bronze medal – third place	2000 Sydney	Mixed air rifle prone SH1
Bronze medal – third place	2000 Sydney	Men's air rifle standing SH1

Jonas Jacobsson (born 22 June 1965) is a Swedish sport shooter who has won several gold medals at the Paralympic Games. He participated in ten consecutive Summer Paralympics from 1980 to 2016, winning a total of seventeen gold, four silver, and nine bronze medals. In 1996, he won two gold medals in the air rifle 3×40 and English match events and a bronze in the air rifle prone at the Atlanta Paralympics. At the 2000 Summer Paralympics, he took two gold medals in the free rifle 3×40 and free rifle prone events and two bronzes in air rifle standing and air rifle prone events. Four years later, at the Athens Games, he competed in the same four events and won the gold medal in all of them.

On 10 September 2008 Jacobsson won his 16th gold medal in the Paralympic Games making him the best performing male Paralympics contestant so far. Later that year, he became the first athlete with a physical disability to receive the Svenska Dagbladet Gold Medal, Sweden's most significant sports award.

== See also ==
- Athletes with most gold medals in one event at the Paralympic Games

Awards and achievements
Preceded by Anja Pärson	Svenska Dagbladet Gold Medal; 2008	Succeeded by Helena Jonsson
