= Deanna Coates =

British Paralympic shooter

Deanna Coates MBE
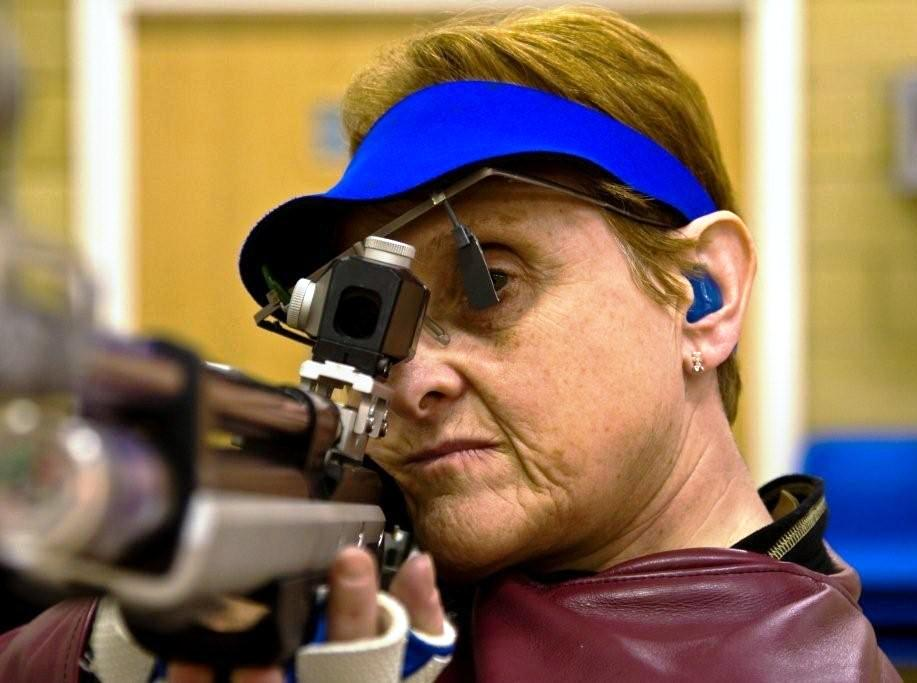

Personal information
- Nickname: Di
- Born: 23 May 1954 (age 72) Farnborough, Hampshire

Sport
- Country: United Kingdom
- Sport: Shooting
- Event: Air rifle
- Coached by: Bernard Kooistra
Medal record
Paralympic Games
Gold medal – first place	1988 Seoul	Women's Air Rifle Standing 2–6
Gold medal – first place	1992 Barcelona	Mixed Air Rifle Standing SH1>3
Gold medal – first place	1996 Atlanta	Women's Air Rifle Standing SH1
Silver medal – second place	1984 New York / Stoke Mandeville	Women's Air Rifle Kneeling 2–6
Silver medal – second place	1984 New York / Stoke Mandeville	Women's Air Rifle Standing 2–6
Silver medal – second place	1996 Atlanta	Women's Air Rifle 3x20 SH1
Bronze medal – third place	1984 New York / Stoke Mandeville	Women's Air Rifle 3 Positions 2–6
Bronze medal – third place	2000 Sydney	Women's Air Rifle Standing SH1

Deanna "Di" Coates MBE (born 23 May 1954) is a sport shooter who has competed in eight Paralympic Games winning three gold medals.

== Personal life ==
Coates was born on 23 May 1954 and lives in Hampshire.

== Sporting career ==
Coates started training in 1978, joining the Rushmoor Mallards Sports Club, a club based in Farnborough, and offering a wide range of disabled sport . Coates first represented Great Britain at the Paralympic Games in 1984, entering four air rifle events (prone, 3 positions, kneeling, and standing) winning two silver medals and a bronze. It would prove to be the start of a lengthy international career.

At the 1988 Games in Seoul Coates competed in the same four events, winning her first Paralympic gold in the standing shoot. She won another gold medal in Barcelona in 1992, then a gold and a silver in Atlanta 1996. Her final medal came at the 2000 Games in Sydney where she won a bronze, and though she has competed in the 2004, 2008, and 2012 Games she has been unable to finish in a medal-scoring position. Coates also won titles and medals in other events, including the IPC World Championships and Shooting World Cups.

By competing in eight different Games Coates is Britain's most experienced Paralympian. As she competed at the 1984 Games in Stoke Mandeville Coates was also the only member of the 2012 British Olympic/Paralympic team to have previously competed at a home Games.

Coates was shortlisted for the 2012 Whang Youn Dai Achievement Award, given at the end of each Paralympic Games to a competitor who has shown themselves to be "fair, honest and uncompromising in his or her values, and prioritises the promotion of the Paralympic Movement above personal recognition".

Coates is now working as a coach, helping young people get into sport shooting.
