= Franc Pinter =

Slovenian paralympian

Personal information
- Born: 24 December 1953
- Died: December 2023 (aged 69–70)

Sport
- Sport: Paralympic shooting
Medal record
Men's Paralympic shooting
Representing Slovenia
Paralympic Games
Silver medal – second place	1996 Summer Paralympics	R1
Silver medal – second place	2000 Summer Paralympics	R1
Silver medal – second place	2004 Summer Paralympics	R1
Bronze medal – third place	2008 Summer Paralympics	R1

Franc Pinter (24 December 1953 – December 2023) was a Slovenian sport shooter from Slovenska Bistrica who has won several medals at the Paralympic Games.

Pinter sustained a spinal cord injury in a car accident in 1977. Following the accident, he practiced several sports, including wheelchair basketball, Para athletics, Para swimming, and Para table tennis, where he competed at the elite level. Finally, he decided to focus on sport shooting. Making his Paralympic debut at the 1992 Summer Paralympics in Barcelona, Pinter has represented Slovenia at every Paralympics since, with the 2020 Summer Paralympics in Tokyo being his eighth appearance.

As a paraplegic, Pinter competed in the SH1 category. At the Paralympics, he competed in R1 – Men's 10m air rifle standing, R3 – Mixed 10m air rifle prone, R6 – Mixed 50m rifle prone SH1, and R7 – Men's 50m rifle 3 positions disciplines. In his seven Paralympic appearances, he won four medals, three silver and one bronze, all in the R1 discipline. He won silver medals at the 1996, 2000, and 2004 Summer Paralympics, and a bronze medal at the 2008 Summer Paralympics in Beijing. At the 2016 Summer Paralympics in Rio de Janeiro, he finished 11th in this discipline. At the age of 67, Pinter was one of the oldest athletes at the 2020 Summer Paralympics. Preparing for the Games, Pinter stated that he was in a good shape in 2020, but the event was postponed due to the COVID-19 pandemic, he also regretted the absence of international competitions during the pandemic. He was coached by Polonca Sladič, who was also the coach of Živa Dvoršak at the 2020 Summer Olympics. In Tokyo, he finished 10th in the R1 discipline.

For his achievements in Para-sports, Pinter has received several awards and recognitions. He was named Athlete of the Year by the Paralympic Sports Federation of Slovenia and the Paralympic Committee of Slovenia in 1996, 2000, 2001, 2002, 2004, 2005, and 2006. He was also awarded the Bloudek certificate of recognition in 2007 for his achievements in Para-shooting.
