= Libby Kosmala =

Australian Paralympic shooter

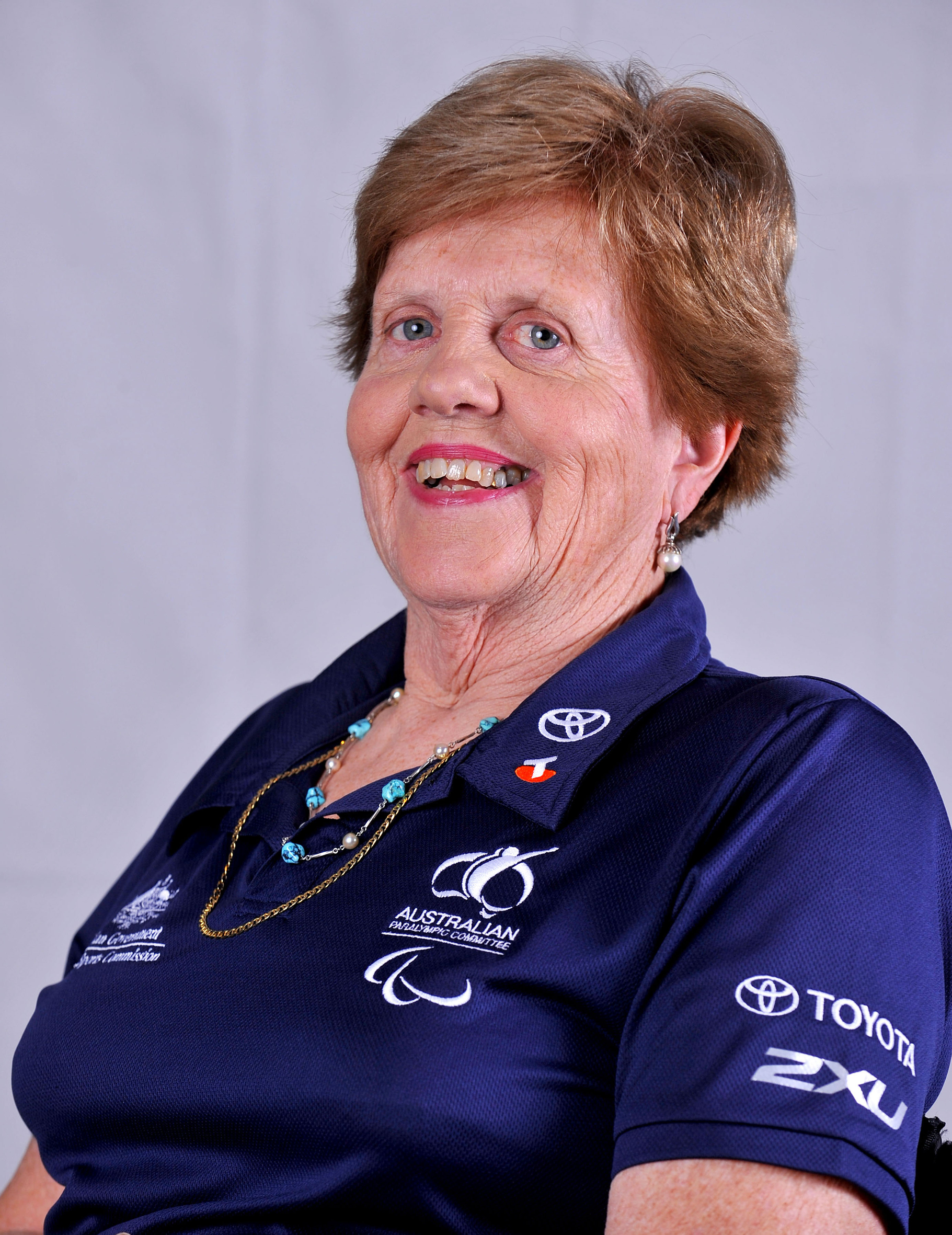
- 2012 Australian Paralympic team portrait

Personal information
- Full name: Elizabeth Dudley Kosmala
- Born: 8 July 1942 (age 83) Adelaide, Australia

Sport
- Country: Australia
Medal record
Paralympic Games
Women's Paralympic swimming
Bronze medal – third place	1972 Heidelberg	3x50 m Medley 2–4
Women's Paralympic shooting
Gold medal – first place	1976 Toronto	Mixed Rifle Shooting 2–5
Gold medal – first place	1980 Arnhem	Mixed Air Rifle Prone 2–5
Gold medal – first place	1984 New York/ Stoke Mandeville	Air Rifle 3 Positions 2–6
Gold medal – first place	1984 New York/ Stoke Mandeville	Air Rifle Kneeling 2–6
Gold medal – first place	1984 New York/ Stoke Mandeville	Air Rifle Prone 2–6
Gold medal – first place	1984 New York/ Stoke Mandeville	Air Rifle Standing 2–6
Gold medal – first place	1988 Seoul	Air Rifle 3 Positions 2–6
Gold medal – first place	1988 Seoul	Air Rifle Kneeling 2–6
Gold medal – first place	1988 Seoul	Air Rifle Prone 2–6
Silver medal – second place	1980 Arnhem	Mixed Air Rifle 3 Positions 2–5
Silver medal – second place	1980 Arnhem	Mixed Air Rifle Kneeling 2–5
Silver medal – second place	1988 Seoul	Air Rifle Standing 2–6

Elizabeth "Libby" Dudley Kosmala (née Richards) OAM (born 8 July 1942) is an Australian shooter with paraplegia. She represented Australia at twelve Paralympics from 1972 to 2016, and won thirteen medals, nine of them gold.

== Early life and education ==
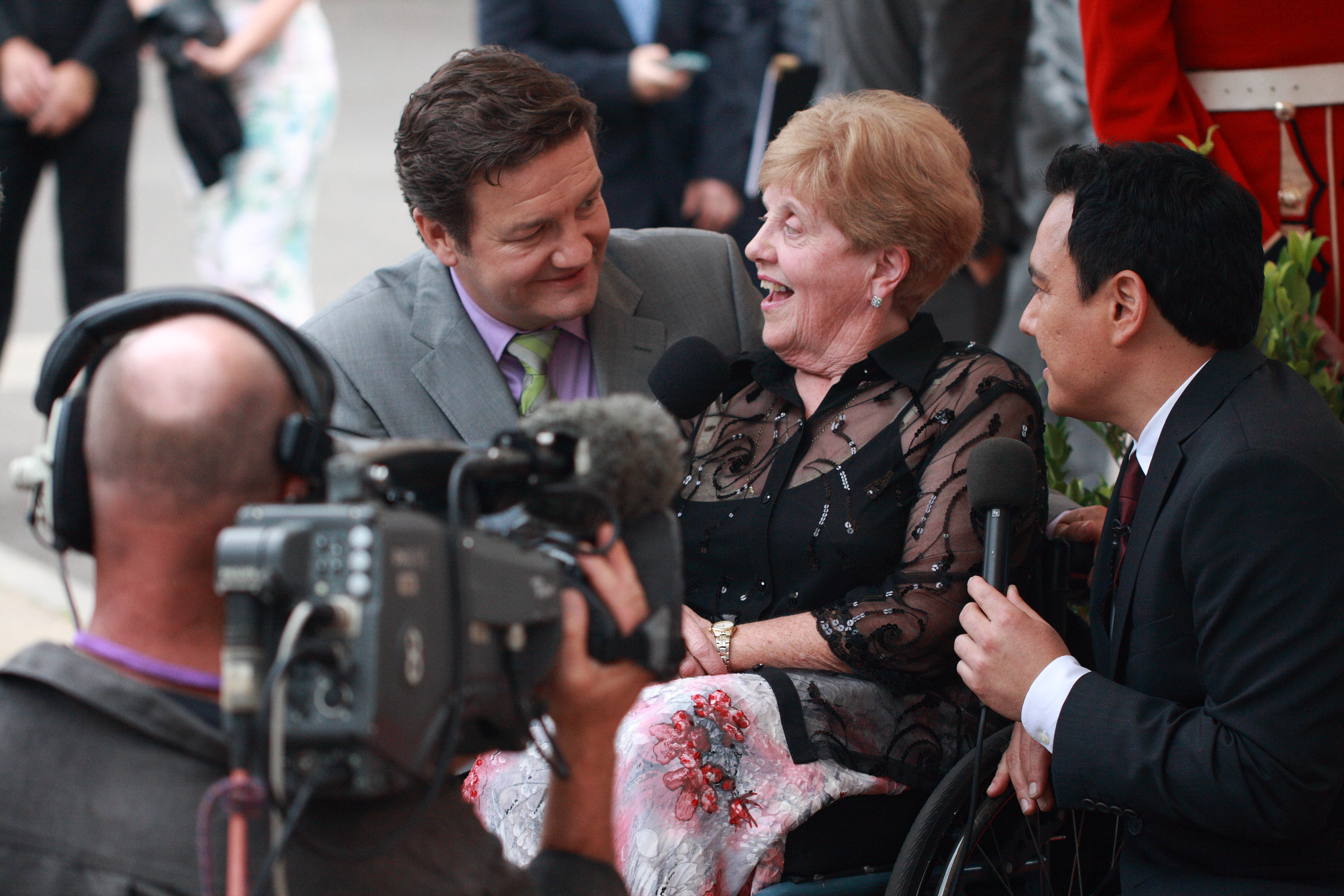
Kosmala interviewed by the Australian Broadcasting Corporation outside the 2012 Australian Paralympian of the Year ceremony

Kosmala was born on 8 July 1942 in Adelaide. Her father was a lawyer. She was born with club feet, which were straightened out with plasters and bandages. She was initially classified as having spina bifida, but at the age of 50, she discovered that her paraplegia was due to birth-related complications; she was delivered in a long operation using forceps by a cardiologist. She is paralysed from the waist down, and her spine is of normal thickness down to the middle of her back, thins out to the size of a pencil, then comes out normally again. She learnt to stand at the age of seven, and her parents made her walk from 20 to 30 minutes a day from then until she was seventeen years old. She learnt to walk in full-length callipers, surgical boots, and with two walking sticks. She attended Loreto Convent School, where she was not allowed to do physical activities.

She trained to be a secretary at the rehabilitation unit of the Royal Adelaide Hospital, and received her first job as a secretary at the Adelaide Botanic Garden at the age of 20. She was there for eleven years, then transferred to the heart and lung investigative unit of the Royal Adelaide Hospital. She then worked part-time after having children. She also worked as a public relations officer for the spina bifida association for twelve years before retiring. She met her husband, Stan Kosmala, in the 1970s through wheelchair sport. He won a gold medal at the 1988 Seoul Paralympics in lawn bowls. They have two sons and two grandchildren.

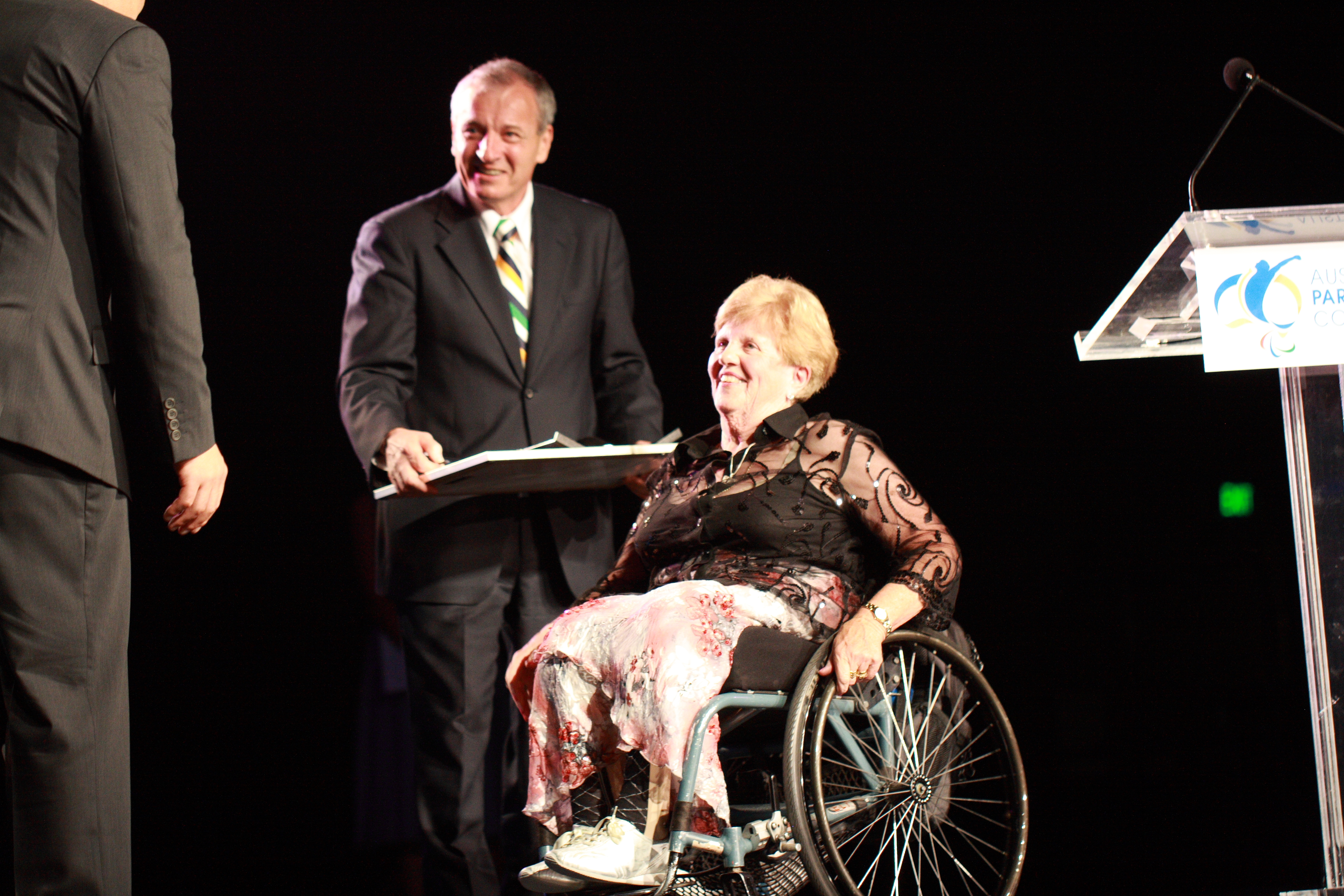
Receiving the President's Medal for Excellence in Sportsmanship at the 2012 Australian Paralympian of the Year ceremony

== Competitive career ==
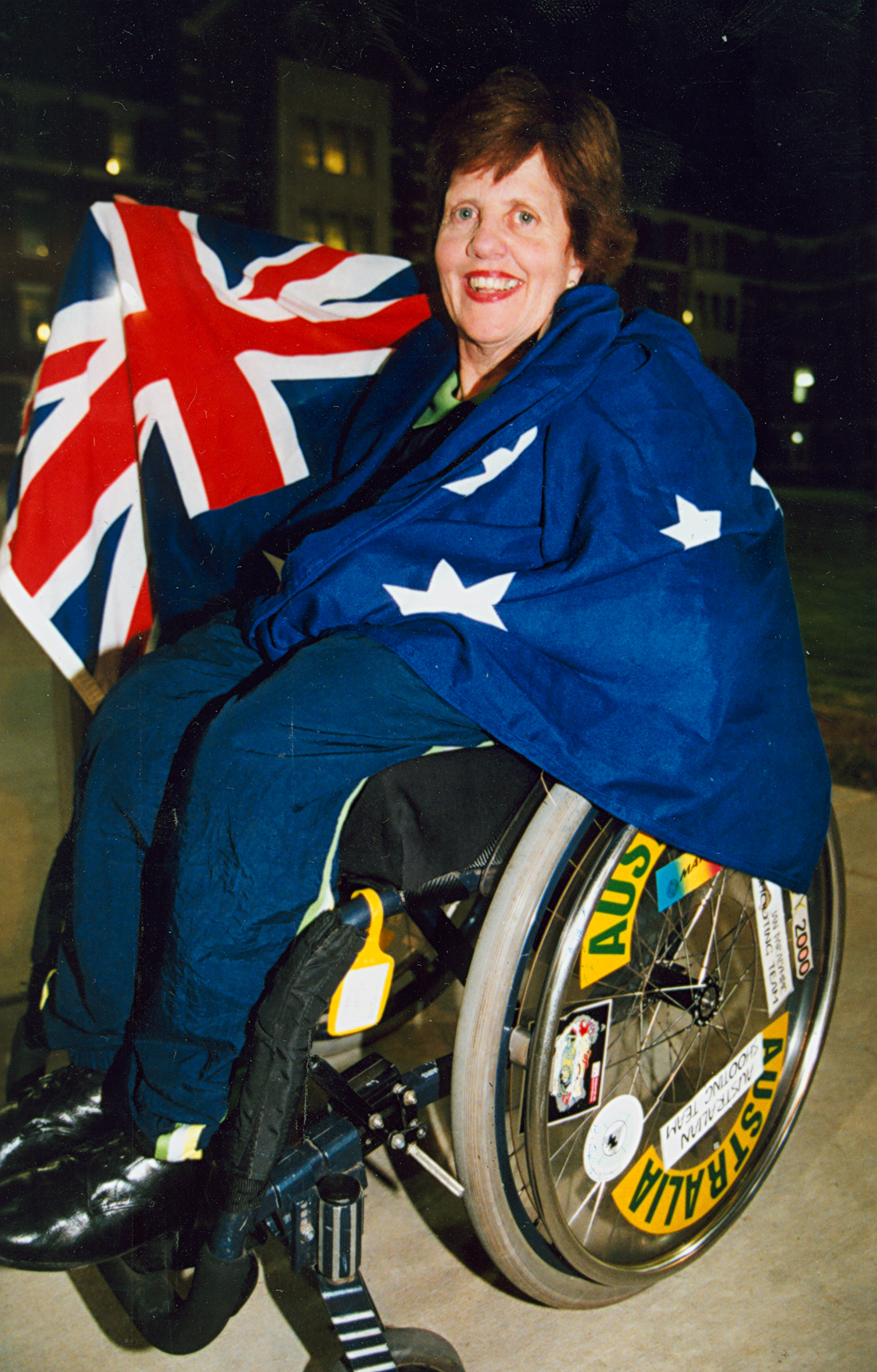
Kosmala at the 1996 Summer Paralympics in Atlanta

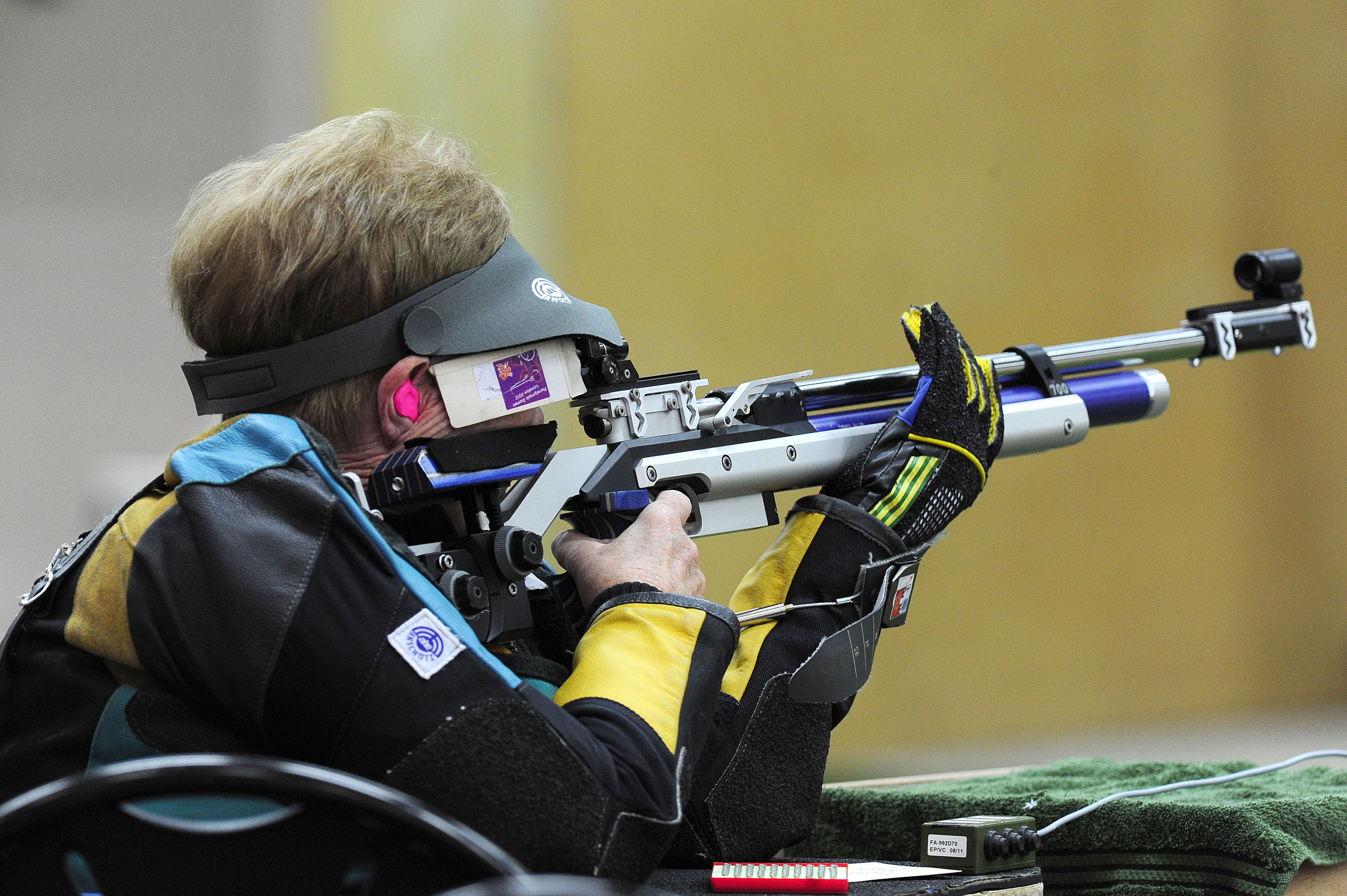
Kosmala shooting at the 2012 London Paralympic

Kosmala represented Australia at twelve Paralympics from 1972 to 2016, and won thirteen medals, nine of them gold.

Kosmala was introduced to wheelchair sport by a patient at the Royal Adelaide Hospital, a few months before starting work at the Adelaide Botanic Garden. She first competed nationally at the 1966 National Wheelchair Games in Brisbane. She competed in foil fencing, swimming, wheelchair racing, field events, and archery. In a 2011 interview, she said that the organiser who picked the team for the 1968 Tel Aviv Paralympics forgot to include her, so she worked as a secretary at the games instead. She won two gold medals in archery and foil fencing, a silver medal in the pentathlon, and four bronze medals in swimming and wheelchair racing events at the 1970 Commonwealth Paraplegic Games in Edinburgh, in her first international event. She initially had to raise all her own money for the games, but after a radio interview and a newspaper article about her plight, John Eustice Motors gave her a cheque with all the money required for the games.

At the 1972 Heidelberg Paralympics, she won a bronze medal in swimming in the Women's 3x50 m Medley Relay 2–4 event, and participated in other swimming and athletics events. She was introduced to rifle shooting in the early 1970s, and consistently hit the target on her first try at the sport. At the 1976 Toronto Games, she won a gold medal in the Mixed Rifle Shooting 2–5 event, and participated in archery and dartchery events.

At the 1980 Arnhem Games, she won a gold medal in the Mixed Air Rifle Prone 2–5 event, and two silver medals in the Mixed Air Rifle 3 Positions 2–5 and Mixed Air Rifle Kneeling 2–5 events. At the 1984 New York/Stoke Mandeville Games, she won four gold medals and broke four world records in the Women's Air Rifle 3 Positions 2–6, Women's Air Rifle Kneeling 2–6, Women's Air Rifle Prone 2–6, and Women's Air Rifle Standing 2–6 events. At the 1988 Seoul Games, she won three gold medals in the Women's Air Rifle 3 Positions 2–6, Women's Air Rifle Kneeling 2–6, and Women's Air Rifle Prone 2–6 events, and a silver medal in the Women's Air Rifle Standing 2–6 event. She participated in every Paralympics from then until the 2016 Rio de Janeiro Games without winning medals, though her scores gradually improved over time. She was the Australian flag bearer for the opening ceremony at the 1996 Atlanta Games. At the 2000 Sydney Games, she competed against her husband in the preliminary round of the Mixed Air Rifle Prone SH1- event, and came eighth just in front of him. She achieved her best ever result in the Women's Air Rifle Standing SH1- event at the 2008 Beijing Games, where she narrowly missed out on a medal. She was Australia's oldest representative at the Beijing Games and the oldest Paralympian overall at the 2012 London Games, where she announced her retirement. However, she came back to compete, after being selected in the 2016 Rio de Janeiro Games. At the 2016 Paralympics she was once again the oldest competitor, finishing her Paralympic career placing 18th in the Women's R2 – 10 m Air Rifle Standing – SH1 qualification and 37th in the Mixed R3 – 10 m Air Rifle Prone – SH1 qualification. She announced her retirement from all competitive shooting in August 2020. She was coached by Yvonne Hill throughout her shooting career, and also works with National Rifle Shooting Coach Miro Sepic. She received scholarships from the South Australian Institute of Sport every year of her career beginning in 1985.

In 1994, she was initially barred from participating in an air rifle shooting state championship, despite being the club champion, because she was in a wheelchair. She eventually won the competition but the trophy was awarded to the person who came second rather than her. The case was eventually reconciled in court. In 2003, she had both her everyday and sporting wheelchairs stolen while on an Emirates flight from Dubai to Germany to compete in the national games. She used borrowed wheelchairs while in Germany, and when she arrived home with no wheelchair to return to, she said that it was the first time in her life that she really felt "disabled". The airline company gave her 2,000 dollars towards the cost of replacement wheelchairs, which were worth 5,000 dollars each.

== Other activities ==
She played a part in the introduction of disabled parking permits in South Australia, after accumulating and refusing to pay many parking fines for parking too long in a fifteen-minute parking area. She won a court case against the City of Adelaide on the issue, but was asked to pay her court costs, which were covered by an anonymous donor.

In 2013, Kosmala became the inaugural patron of Technical Aid to the Disabled South Australia (TADSA), a charity that aims to help people with disabilities overcome problems by designing and building or modifying devices where no other solution is readily available. Kosmala's first contact with TADSA was as a client in the late 1970s. In rifle shooting, competitors ordinarily lie flat to shoot. As she is in a wheelchair this was not possible, so she needed something to rest upon, and also have a place for her ammunition. TADSA built a table for Kosmala to alleviate this problem. As she had to take it with her for international competitions, it had to be a lightweight folding table (Kosmala would pack it in her suitcase). She said "It's probably fair to say that this table (which has been to 10 Paralympic Games) has helped me win my gold medals."

== Recognition ==
In 1985, Kosmala received a Medal of the Order of Australia "for service to the sport of air rifle shooting".

She received an Australian Sports Medal in 2000 and a Centenary Medal in 2001.

In 2016, she received the Tanya Denver Award at The Advertiser/Channel 7 Sport Star of the Year awards.

In 2019, Kosmala was inducted into the South Australian Sport Hall of Fame.

In 2021, she was inducted into the Sport Australia Hall of Fame. In 2022, she was inducted into the Paralympics Australia Hall of Fame.
