= Australia at the 1976 Summer Paralympics =

- IPC code: AUS
- NPC: Australian Paralympic Committee
- Website: www.paralympic.org.au

in Toronto
- Medals Ranked 11th: Gold 16 Silver 18 Bronze 7 Total 41

Summer Paralympics appearances (overview)
- 1960; 1964; 1968; 1972; 1976; 1980; 1984; 1988; 1992; 1996; 2000; 2004; 2008; 2012; 2016; 2020; 2024

Australia has participated in every Summer Paralympic Games since the inception of the Paralympics in the year 1960. The 1976 Paralympic Games in Toronto was Australia's fifth Paralympic Games. Australia competed in 10 out of the 13 sports and were able to win medals in six of these sports. There were 44 athletes representing Australia at the Games with a number of these athletes participating in multiple sports. Of the 44 athletes, 34 were males and 10 were females. As a team, Australia won 41 medals, 16 of which were gold. This placed it just outside the top 10 in 11th position at the end of the Games. The Australian team won more gold medals at the 1976 Paralympic Games than at any of the previous four Paralympic Games. 26 athletes finished on the podium in their respective events. This represents more than half the number of athletes that Australia sent to Toronto. Six world records were broken by Australian athletes on their way to winning their respective events.

== Background ==
The 1976 Summer Paralympic Games was held in Toronto, Ontario, Canada from August 4–12. This was the first and only time that Canada has hosted a Summer Paralympic Games. The Games were not held in the same city as the Olympic Games of the same year, with the 1976 Olympic Games held in Montreal, Quebec, Canada. At the time, the 1976 Summer Paralympics in Toronto was called the 'Torontolympiad'. The name 'Paralympic Games' was not officially adopted until 1984. The 1976 Summer Paralympics was the first time that amputees and visionally impaired athletes were invited to participate in the Paralympic Games. For the previous four Paralympic Games, participation was restricted to spinal cord injury athletes. Other disabilities – amputees, Cerebral Palsy, Intellectual Impaired and Vision Impaired – were unable to compete at the Paralympic Games. However, they had their own local and national competitions and, in some cases, their own world championships. Canadian athletes from each of disabilities, amputees, spinal cord injuries and visually impaired, lit the flame at the Opening ceremony at Woodbine Racecourse in front of 20 000 spectators. The inclusion of more disability categories and the introduction of new sports including Shooting and Goalball increased the number of medal events at the Paralympic Games. There were 13 sports in total at the 1976 Summer Paralympics, 8 of which women participated in. The 1976 Summer Paralympics was the first Games in which there was television coverage of the events. The performances were shown to a wide audience of viewers from the Southern Ontario region. There was however, no television coverage in Australia dedicated to the 1976 Paralympic Games.

== Notable Performances ==
The top Australian athletes at the 1976 Paralympic Games were triple gold medallists, Eric Russell and Tracey Freeman and double gold medallist, Gail Nicholson.

- Eric Russell

Eric Russell won three Gold medals as well as a silver medal at his first Paralympic Games. Russell won the discus, shot put and the pentathlon events. He also competed in wheelchair basketball but did not win a medal as the team did not advance pass the group round stage. Russell won the Men's Discus 3 event with a world record throw of 27.15 metres. David Williamson of the United States placed second with a throw of 25.57 metres. Russell went on to compete at two more Paralympic Games, winning a total of 4 gold medals, 1 silver and 2 bronze throughout his career.

- Tracey Freeman

Tracey Freeman competed at her first Paralympics in 1972 and represented Australia for a second time in 1976. At the 1976 Paralympic Games, Freeman won a medal in 5 of the 6 events in which she competed in. Freeman competed in a number of track and field events including shot put, the javelin, discus and sprint races and achieved a world record for every event in which she won a gold medal. In 1972, Freeman became the first female athlete to win a gold medal for Australia in a track and field event at the Paralympic Games. She went on to win a total of six gold medals and four silver medals making her one of the most successful Paralympians of her time to represent Australia. Her performance in Toronto made her the most successful Australian athlete at the 1976 games. Freeman's incredible effort earned her the Queensland Sportswomen of the Year Award, the first time it has been given to a disabled athlete, and marked the end of her international career. Her career only spanned two Paralympics, as the injuries from a car accident thwarted her efforts to qualify for the 1980 Paralympics, but she won 10 medals, six of which were gold.

- Gail Nicholson

Gail Nicholson was the golden girl of the pool winning 2 gold medals in swimming events. Nicholson won the 100 metres freestyle event in world record time as well as the 100 metres backstroke event in a time of 1 minute 45 seconds.

- Vic Renalson

Vic Renalson had previously won medals at the 1964, 1968 and 1972 Summer Paralympics in the heavyweight division. His gold medal at the Toronto Games in the middleweight weightlifting event brought the total number of medals won in weightlifting events to 4, 3 gold medals and 1 silver medal. Renalson did not compete in any track and field events at the 1976 Paralympic games however, he had won 2 gold medals, 2 silver medals and 2 bronze medals in track and field events in previous games bringing the total number of medals won at the Paralympic Games to 10. After his retirement, Renalson would go on to become successful coach with the Australian institute of sport and at the Seoul Paralympic Games.

== Controversies ==
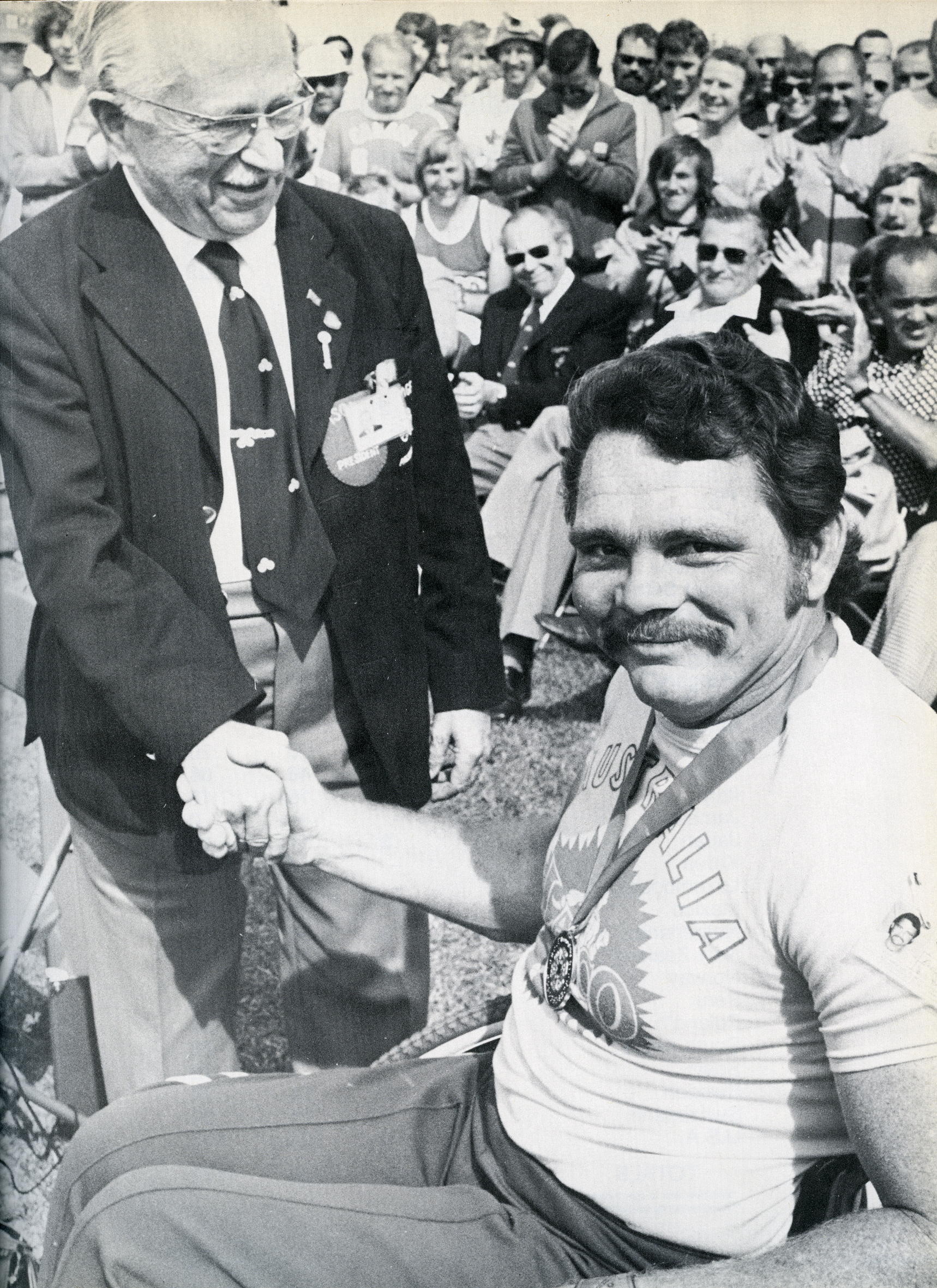
Australian athlete Eric Russell with Ludwig Guttmann at the 1976 summer Paralympics

Prior to the start of the Games, there was controversy regarding the participation of the South African team. This was the first time that a political issue had caused a disruption to the Paralympics. A number of countries including Kenya, Sudan and Yugoslavia withdrew their athletes from the Games in protest to the participation of South Africa in the Games. Allowing South Africa into the Games was seen by these countries as agreeing to the apartheid policy implemented by the South African Government at the time. One of Australia's gold medal winners, Eric Russell entered into the controversy by refusing to accept his gold medal at the podium for winning the men's wheelchair discus event. He stated that this was in protest to politics playing a role in the Games itself. It was later reported that Russell had wanted to present the medal to Ludwig Guttmann, the founder of the Paralympic Games, but Guttman had refused to accept it. Guttman would later present the medal to Russell at a later date. The medal was then sold at an auction to a real estate agency to raise money for a Queensland rugby player. The last minute withdrawals caused havoc to the organisation of the Games as a result of rescheduling issues. There was a lack of communication between athletes and organisers in regards to event schedules as the organisers rushed to reschedule events for the next day's competition. The Australian wheelchair basketball team missed their group round match because of confusion over the match schedule. The match was later rescheduled to a later time however, the team was unable to make it pass the group round stage.

== Team Selection ==
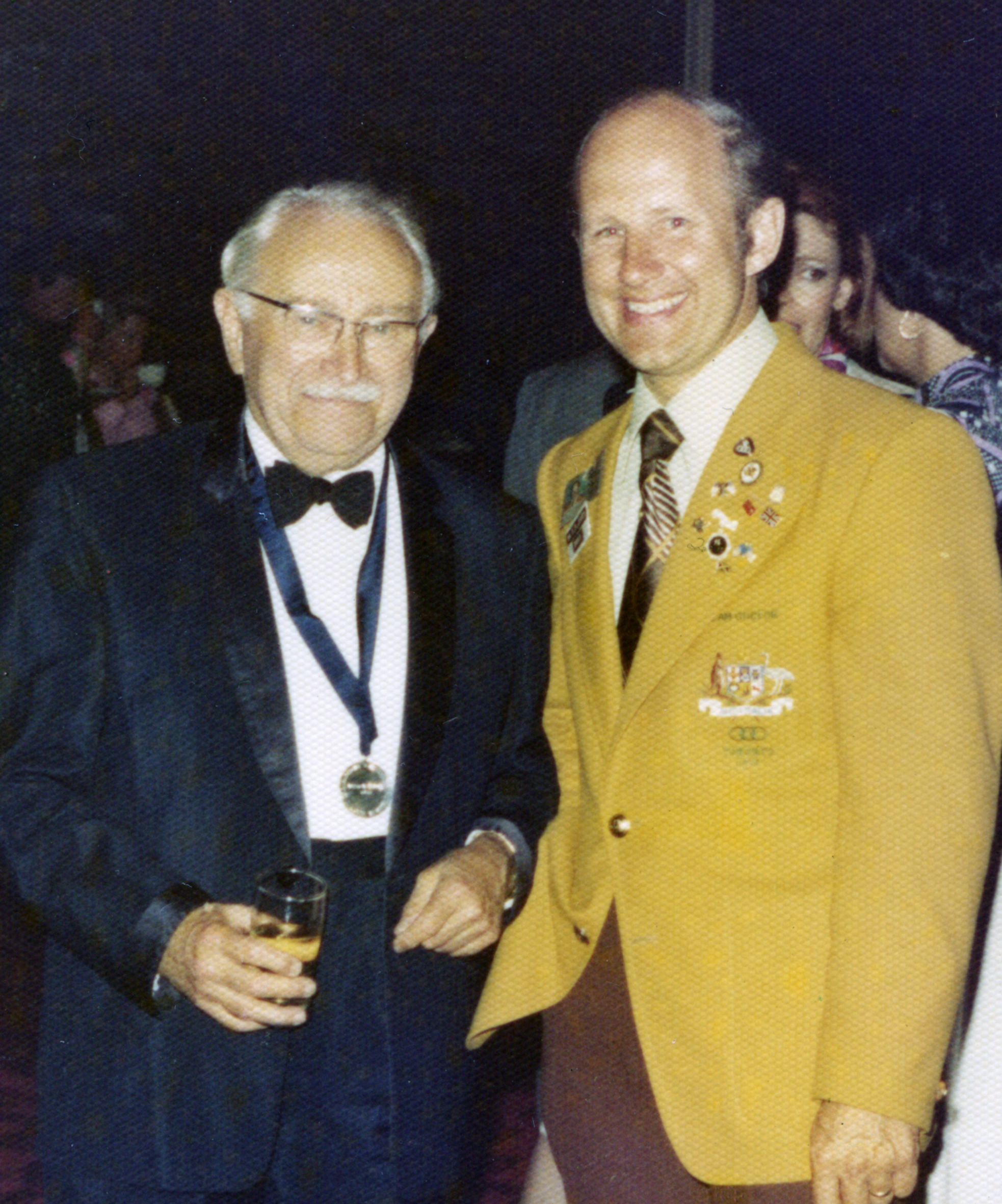
Paralympic movement founder Ludwig Guttmann with Australian Team leader Richard Jones at a function at the 1976 Paralympic Games

Qualifying for the 1976 Summer Paralympics for individual events took place at the National Wheelchair Games held in Brisbane earlier in the year. The games were sponsored by the Queensland Sporting Wheelies and Disabled Association. Selection for team sports was made by the Australian Paraplegic and Quadriplegic Council with assistance from the state organisations. The federal government provided a number of grants to help cover the travel costs for the Australian national Paralympic team to go to Toronto for the games. These subsidies were small and most athletes were expected to pay their own way in order to compete. The Queensland Sporting Wheelies and Disabled Association also provided financial support to athletes from Queensland who competed at the 1976 Paralympic Games.

== Medalists ==
Medal	Name	Sport	Event
Gold	Wayne Patchett	Athletics	Men's Discus throw 1A
Gold	Eric Russell	Athletics	Men's Discus throw 3
Gold	Eric Russell	Athletics	Men's Shot put 3
Gold	Eric Russell	Athletics	Men's Pentathlon 3
Gold	Tracey Freeman	Athletics	Women's 60 m 1C
Gold	Tracey Freeman	Athletics	Women's Javelin throw 1C
Gold	Tracey Freeman	Athletics	Women's Shot put 1C
Gold	Margaret Ross, John Kestel	Dartchery	Mixed pairs open
Gold	Robert Farmer	Lawn bowls	Men's Singles A
Gold	Eric Magennis, Bruce Thwaite	Lawn bowls	Men's Pairs wh
Gold	Adele Jackson, Charmaine Smith	Lawn bowls	Women's Pairs B
Gold	Elizabeth Richards	Shooting	Mixed rifle shooting 2-5
Gold	Gail Nicholson	Swimming	Women's 100 m freestyle C
Gold	Gail Nicholson	Swimming	Women's 100 m backstroke C
Gold	Pauline English	Swimming	Women's 25 m butterfly 4
Gold	Vic Renalson	Weightlifting	Men's middleweight
Silver	Robert Faulkner	Athletics	Men's 100 m B
Silver	Doug Rupe	Athletics	Men's High jump A
Silver	Harry Moseby	Athletics	Men's Discus throw C1
Silver	Eric Russell	Athletics	Men's Javelin throw 3
Silver	John Kidd	Athletics	Men's Javelin throw 4
Silver	Jago Mikulic	Athletics	Men's Javelin throw A
Silver	Wayne Patchett	Athletics	Men's Shot put 1A
Silver	Murray Todd	Athletics	Men's Shot put 2
Silver	Tracey Freeman	Athletics	Women's Discus throw 1C
Silver	Tracey Freeman	Athletics	Women's Slalom 1C
Silver	Elaine Schreiber	Athletics	Women's Javelin throw 2
Silver	James Handbridge	Lawn bowls	Men's Singles C
Silver	Charmaine Smith	Lawn bowls	Women's Singles B
Silver	John Hind	Swimming	Men's 25 m freestyle 2
Silver	John Hind	Swimming	Men's 25 m butterfly 2
Silver	John Hind	Swimming	Men's 75 m individual medley 2
Silver	Lyn Michael	Swimming	Women's 25 m freestyle 2
Silver	Lyn Michael	Swimming	Women's 75 m individual medley 2
Bronze	Peter Marsh	Athletics	Men's 60 m 1A
Bronze	Peter Marsh	Athletics	Men's Precision club throw 1A-1B
Bronze	John Kestel	Athletics	Men's Javelin throw 2
Bronze	Jago Mikulic	Athletics	Men's Pentathlon A
Bronze	Roy Kubig	Swimming	Men's 50 m backstroke 3
Bronze	Pauline English	Swimming	Women's 150 m individual medley 4
Bronze	Terry Mason	Weightlifting	Men's light featherweight

Medals by discipline
Discipline	Gold medal	Silver medal	Bronze medal	Total
Archery	0	0	0	0
Athletics	7	11	5	23
Dartchery	1	0	0	1
Lawn bowls	3	2	0	5
Shooting	1	0	0	1
Snooker	0	0	0	0
Swimming	3	5	2	10
Table tennis	0	0	0	0
Weightlifting	1	0	1	2
Wheelchair basketball	0	0	0	0
Wheelchair fencing	0	0	0	0
Total	16	18	8	42

== Events ==
=== Archery ===
Australia represented by:
Men – Wayne Flood, Roy Fowler, Jeff Heath, Ross Soutar
Women – Charmaine McLean, Elizabeth Richards, Margaret Ross

Australia did not win any medals.

Australia had four male representatives in Archery. Roy Fowler finished 14th in the Men's FITA Round Open event with 2048 points. He was 152 points behind the gold medal winner, Guy Grun from Belgium. Jeff Heath competed in the Men's novice round open event and finished in 11th position. Ross Soutar competed for Australia in the shot metric round open event and placed 2nd. However, since there were only two competitors in the event, he was not awarded the silver medal. Wayne Flood also competed but did not advance to the final.

On the women's side, Australia had three representatives. Margaret Ross competed in the advanced metric round event and finished in 10th position. Charmaine McLean came the closest of any of the Australians to winning a medal, placing 4th in her event, the novice round open. Elizabeth Richards did not advance to the final of her event.

Australia also competed as a team in the men's tetraplegics round A-C event in which it placed last with 1314 points. Australia ended the 1976 games with no medals in Archery.

=== Athletics ===
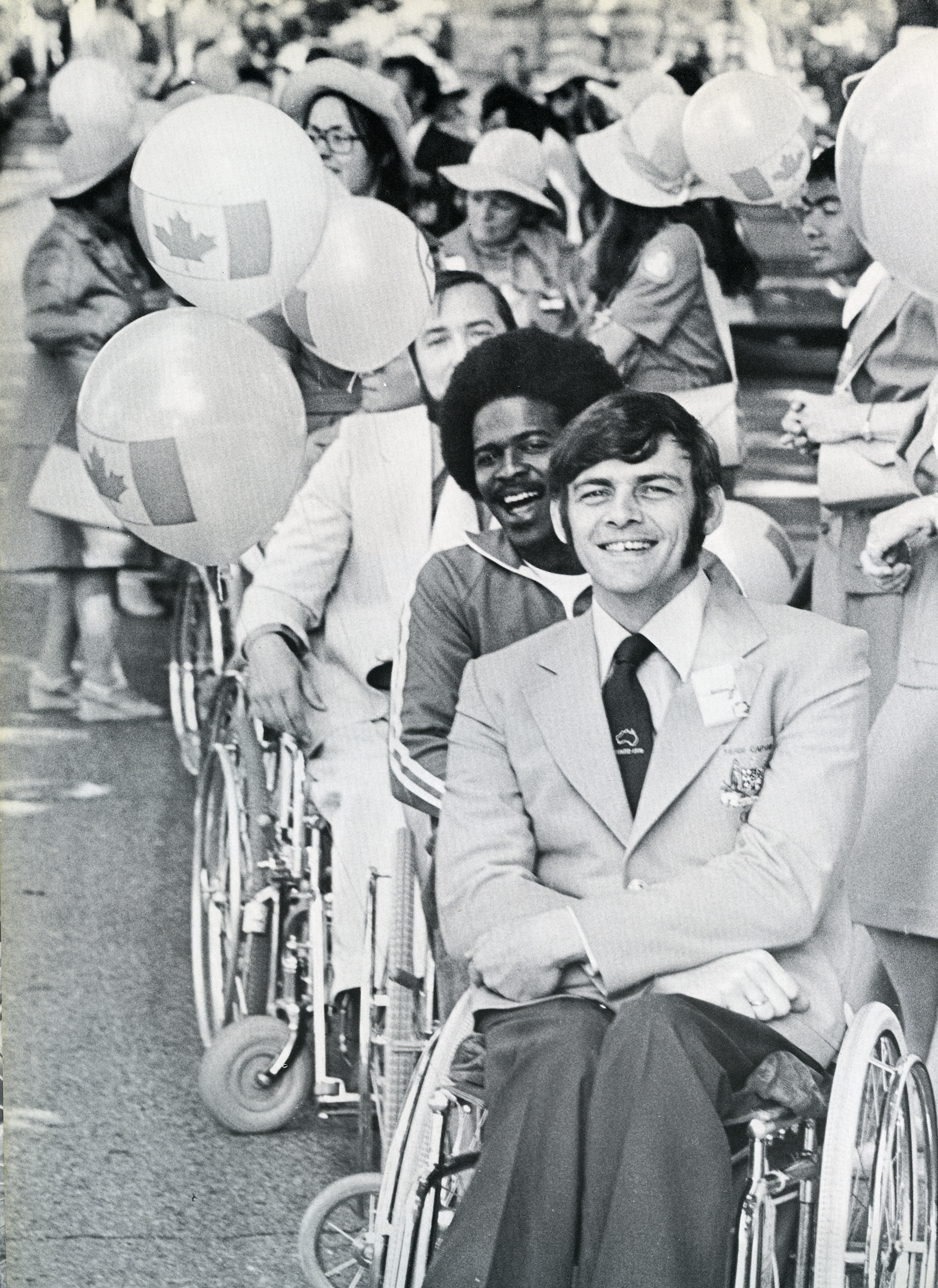
Gold medal winner Wayne Patchett at the Olympic Ceremony of the 1976 Paralympic Games.

Australia represented by:
Men – Robert Faulkner, Wayne Flood, Paul Gianni, Dennis Kay, John Kestel, John Kidd, Stan Kosmala, Peter Marsh, John Martin, Terry Mason, Robert McIntyre, Jeff McNeil, Jago Mikulic, Harry Moseby, Richard Oliver, Wayne Patchett, Frank Ponta, Vic Renalson, Doug Rupe, Eric Russell Ross Soutar, Murray Todd
Women – Tracey Freeman, Elaine Schreiber

The Australian athletics' team won 23 medals, of which 7 were gold, 11 were silver and 5 were bronze medals.

Of the 16 gold medals won by Australia, 7 were won by the track and field team. The team consisted of 24 athletes who made up more than half of the total Australian team. Only two athletes were females while the remaining 22 were males. Outstanding performances were seen by a number of athletes including Tracey Freeman and Eric Russell who both won three gold medals each. Freeman won the wheelchair sprint, javelin and shot put, creating three world records in events for quadriplegics as well as picking up silver medals in the slalom and discus events. Wayne Patchett won the remaining gold medal in the Men's discus throw 1A event as well as a silver in the shot-put event.

=== Dartchery ===
Australia represented by:
Men – Roy Fowler, Jeff Heath, John Kestel
Women – Elizabeth Richards, Charmaine McLean, Margaret Ross

Australia won 1 gold medal - John Kestel and Margaret Ross in Mixed pairs open.

Rank	Athlete(s)	Country	Victories
Gold	J. Kestel & M. Ross	Australia	5
Silver	A. Kalenius & E. Korva	Finland	4
Bronze	A. Desal & A. Verhee	Belgium	3

Australia competed in all three Dartchery team events. Roy Fowler and Jeff Heath competed in the men's pairs open event and placed 9th. Charmaine McLean and Elizabeth Richards represented Australia in the women's pair open event and finished last with no victories. John Kestel and Margaret Ross competed in the mixed pairs open event. They won all their games and as a result, placed first in their division. This gave Australia the only medal in Dartchery in the 1976 Summer Paralympics Games

=== Goalball ===
In 1976, Goalball officially became a medal sport for the first time and was contested by men. Australia however, did not send a team to compete in the men's goal ball event.

=== Lawn Bowls ===
Australia represented by:
Men – Robert Farmer, James Handbridge, Eric Magennis, Bruce Thwaite
Women – Adele Jackson, Charmaine Smith

Australia won 5 medals - 3 gold and 2 silver medals.

Australia competed in six out of the 15 lawn bowls events at the 1976 games. Out of these six events, Australia won three gold medals and two silver medals. Eric Magennis and J. Handbridge came first in the men's pairs wheelchair event winning 4 games. Brazil and Great Britain both won 3 games each. J. Handbridge also won another medal in the Singles C event, this time, a silver medal with 3 victories. Robert Farmer won gold in his event, the Singles A while Bruce Thwaite and Eric Magennis finished 10th and 13th respectively in the Men's singles wheelchair event. The Australian women also performed very well in the lawn bowls events. Adele Jackson and Charmaine Smith competed together in the women's pairs B event and placed first, winning all their matches against Great Britain and Canada. They both also competed in the women's single B event with Smith winning a silver medal and Jackson finishing just outside the medals in 4th position.

=== Shooting ===
Australia represented by:
Men – Kevin Bawden, James Handbridge
Women – Elizabeth Richards

Australia won 1 gold medal through Elizabeth Richard's performance in Mixed rifle shooting 2-5

Rank	Athlete	Country	Points
Gold	Elizabeth Richards	Australia	547
Silver	M. Stadler	Switzerland	516
Bronze	Y. Tam	Israel	512

In the mixed rifle shooting events, males and females competed together in the same competition. There were three competitors from Australia who competed in two events. Elizabeth Richards won the gold medal in the mixed rifle shooting 2-5 division with 547 points. She was 33 points ahead of her nearest rival, Martin Stadler from Switzerland. Kevin Bawden also competed in the same event and placed 7th. J. Handbridge competed in the mixed rifle shooting amputee division and placed 13th.

=== Snooker ===
Australia represented by:
Men – Wayne Flood

Australia did not win a medal.

Wayne Flood was the sole representative of Australia in Snooker. He competed but did not advance to the final of his event.

=== Swimming ===
Australia represented by:
Men – Robert Faulkner, G. Green, John Hind, Roy Kubig, Brian Sullivan
Women – Pauline English, Lyn Michael, Gail Nicholson

Australia won 10 medals - 3 gold, 5 silver and 2 bronze medals.

Australia's swimming team at the 1976 Games consisted of eight swimmers. The team won a total of 10 medals and placed 12th overall in the medal count with five of the eight swimmers winning medals. The Netherlands dominated the swimming events, by winning 36 gold medals and topping the medal tally.

Rank	Country	Gold	Silver	Bronze	Total
1	Netherlands	37	19	8	64
2	Israel	18	5	6	29
3	US	17	5	13	35
12	Australia	3	5	2	10

Gail Nicholson starred in the pool winning two gold medals in the Women's 100m freestyle C and Women's 100m backstroke C events. The 1976 Summer Paralympics was the only Paralympic Games in which Nicolson participated in. Pauline English won a gold medal in the women's 25m butterfly 4 event as well as a bronze in the 3x50m individual medley. She finished her Paralympic career with 1 gold medal and 3 bronze medals from two Paralympic Games. John Hind won three silver medals in his events and was the best performing male swimmer at the Games. Brian Sullivan made it to the final of the men's breaststroke and freestyle A events but did not medal. G. Green failed to make the final of two of the three events he competed in. No gold medals were won by the Australian male swimmers.

=== Table Tennis ===
Australia represented by:
Men – Kevin Bawden, Wayne Flood, Ray Letheby, Peter Marsh, John Martin, Ross Soutar
Women – Elaine Schreiber

Australia did not win any medals.

Australia was represented in the table tennis events by six male athletes and one female athlete. Elaine Schreiber placed fifth in the women's singles 2 event and tied with Peter Marsh and Ross Soutar who also finished 5th in their events as Australia's best performers in table tennis at the 1976 Summer Paralympics. Peter Marsh also competed in the men's doubles 1C event with Wayne Flood and placed 6th overall. Australia's other performers; Ray Letheby, Kevin Bawden and John Martin finished outside the medals in their respective events. As a result, Australia did not win any medals in table tennis at the Toronto Games

=== Volleyball ===
There were no Australian representatives in Volleyball events.

=== Weightlifting ===
Australia represented by:
Men – Terry Mason, Vic Renalson

Australia won 2 medals - gold medal by Vic Renalson and bronze medal by Terry Mason

Men's medium weight division

Vic Renalson won a gold medal in the men's middleweight competition, beating Aoudmond from France by 2.5 kilograms. In the process of winning, he also broke the world record. Renalson had previously won medals at the 1964, 1968 and 1972 Paralympics in the heavyweight division. His gold medal in Toronto brought his total number of medals won in weightlifting events to four, 3 gold medals and 1 silver medal. Renalson did not compete in any track and field events at the 1976 Paralympic games however, he had won 2 gold medals, 2 silver medals and 2 bronze medals in track and field events in previous games bringing the total number of medals won at the Paralympic Games to 10.

Rank	Athlete	Country	Weight (kg)	
Gold	V. Renalson	Australia	182.5	WR
Silver	Auodmond	France	180	
Bronze	R. Taurer	US	160	
4	M. Kelly	Great Britain	152.5	
5	F. Mus	Belgium	145	

Men's light featherweight division

Terry Mason competed in the men's light featherweight division and won the bronze medal with a lift of 122.5 kg. This was 20 kg lighter than the gold medal lift by Shmuel Chaim Ovitch of Israel. Mason also competed in the pentathlon and javelin events but did not win any medals. He had previously won a bronze medal in the pentathlon event at the 1972 Paralympic Games bringing the total of medals won at the Paralympic Games to two.

Rank	Athlete	Country	Weight (kg)
Gold	S. Chaim Ovitch	Israel	142.5
Silver	J.M. Barberane	France	130
Bronze	T. Mason	Australia	122.5
4	J. Martin	US	117.5
5	V. Gaspar	Brazil	110

Australia had no competitors in the other four weightlifting events: Men's featherweight, Men's heavyweight, Men's light heavyweight and Men's lightweight events. There were no women's weightlifting events at the 1976 Paralympic Games.

=== Wheelchair Basketball ===
Australia represented by:
Men - Kevin Bawden, John Kidd, Stan Kosmala, Ray Letheby, John Martin, Robert McIntyre, Richard Oliver, Frank Ponta, Eric Russell, Victor Salvemini

Coach - Les Mathews

The Australian men's team was allocated to Group D in the group round stage. Group D consisted of Sweden, Belgium, Brazil, the United States, Japan and Australia. Australia finished at the bottom of their group, winning only one match against Japan and losing the remaining four matches. As a result, the team was unable to advance to the next stage and finished the tournament with only one win. Israel and the United States competed in the final for the gold medal, with the US team winning the final by 13 points

Group D	W	L	D	Points
US	5	0	0	10
Sweden	3	2	0	6
Belgium	2	2	1	5
Brazil	2	3	0	4
Japan	1	3	1	3
Australia	1	4	0	2

Australian results: Sweden 79 v Australia 51, Belgium 43 v Australia 30, United States 93 v Australia 34, Australia 57 v Japan 42. Australia did not qualify for the finals.

There was no Australian women's wheelchair basketball team at the 1976 Paralympic Games.

=== Wheelchair fencing ===
There were no Australian competitors in any wheelchair fencing events at the 1976 Summer Paralympics

== See also ==
- Australia at the Paralympics
- 1976 Summer Paralympics

== Bibliography ==
- Betters, Kevin F. (1979). "The challenge of sport". Sport for the Handicapped. Australian Council for Rehabilitation of Disabled. pp. 86–88. OCLC 7574272.
