= Australia at the 1980 Summer Paralympics =

- IPC code: AUS
- NPC: Australian Paralympic Committee
- Website: www.paralympic.org.au

in Arnhem
- Competitors: 57
- Medals Ranked 14th: Gold 12 Silver 21 Bronze 22 Total 55

Summer Paralympics appearances (overview)
- 1960; 1964; 1968; 1972; 1976; 1980; 1984; 1988; 1992; 1996; 2000; 2004; 2008; 2012; 2016; 2020; 2024

Australia competed at the 1980 Summer Paralympics in Arnhem, Netherlands. It was the 6th Summer Paralympic Games in which Australia had competed. These Games were the biggest Paralympics yet, with 1,973 people participating. Of those participants, 57 were Australian. The team was made up of 45 men and 12 women, and was Australia's largest team to compete at any Paralympic Games so far.

As a nation, Australia won 55 medals in total – 12 gold, 21 silver and 22 bronze medals. This was the greatest number of medals Australia had ever won at the Paralympic Games, and although they won fewer gold medals than at the previous Games (16 gold medals won at the 1976 Paralympic Games), Australia won more silver and bronze medals than ever before. As a result, Australia placed 14th on the gold medal table and 9th on the overall total medal table. This was an improvement from the 1976 Games, at which they placed 11th, and matched their overall performance at the 1972 Games where they also placed 9th.

== Background ==
The 1980 Arnhem Paralympic Games opened on Saturday the 21st of June at 2pm at the Olympic Stadium. During the planning of the Games, a heated debate raged around whether the South African team should be allowed to participate. While the International Stoke Mandeville Games Federation's Executive Committee showed support for the inclusion of the South African team, numerous sport organisations in the Netherlands and the Dutch Parliament believed they should not be allowed to compete. If the South African team were permitted to compete, the Dutch Parliament, who ultimately had the final say, could prohibit the Games from taking place in Arnhem at all. Therefore, it was eventually decided to exclude the South African team from the Games. Despite the controversy, Australia did not boycott the Paralympic Games, like many did the Moscow Olympic Games.

Before departing for Arnhem, the Prime Minister at the time, Malcolm Fraser spoke to the Australian Paralympic team, congratulating them on behalf of the Government and all Australian's and wishing them good luck and success. Fraser also remarked that, “These Olympics are the culmination of many years of dedication and hard work”. This was reported in the national newspaper, ‘The Australia,’ along with his comment that “I encourage all disabled people to follow your example and take an active part in sporting activities”.

While it appeared that the Australian Paralympians were supported in their endeavours, there was no established governing body for Paralympians at the time. This meant that all competitors needed to raise their own funds in order to pay for their travels. One particular wheelchair athlete (Fred Pointer) travel from Melbourne(MCG) to Sydney(SCG) in his wheelchair in a bid to raise money. Pointer's dedication and determination saw him raise funds for himself along with other donations going into the paraplegic sports club in Melbourne. All this was done in a wheelchair that he designed himself, the wheelchair he subsequently competed in at the 1980 Arnhem Paralympics.

It was decided that the mascot for the Arnhem Paralympics would be a Squirrel. This was done in a show of admiration for disabled men and women, as squirrels have many hard nuts to crack in life, just as those suffering from disabilities do. As a result of the Arnhem Paralympic Games, the International Fund Sport Disabled (IFSD) was born, which provided funding from major disabled sporting events. A great surplus of funds was raised for the IFSD during the games through ‘Telebingo.’

== Team ==
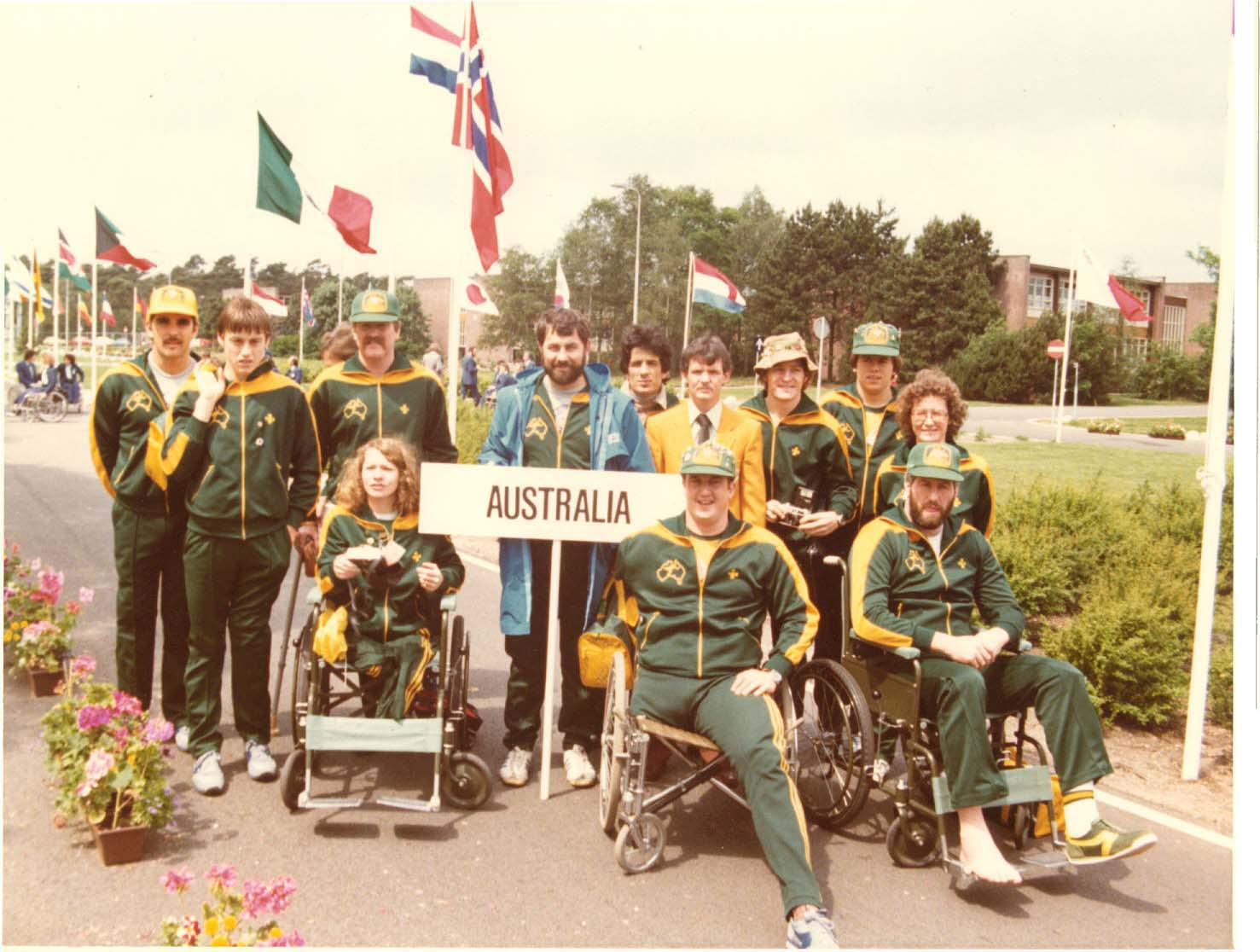
1980 Australian Amputee Team - Arnhem, Holland

Overall, Australia participated in three out of the four classes, and won medals in six out of the 10 different sports they competed in. Despite Australian Amputee athletes not having a nation body, the previous experience at the Torontolympiad and at the Sydney FESPIC Games provided the motivation for individual athletes to attend Arnhem. No selection trials were held, and the eleven athletes who competed had to cover the expenses of getting to and from the Games themselves. Eleven vision-impaired athletes from Australia also competed in Arnhem. These athletes however, had the advantaged of the Australian Blind Sports Federation, a national body that was formed the same year (1980). This organisation serves to provide support for competitive athletes through encouragement, raising funds, assisting in preparation and helping them get there.

The biggest contingent of Australians at Arnhem was athletes with a spinal cord injury. They also experienced the most success, winning a total of 34 medals, which is over half of Australia's total. Even though the 1980 Paralympic Games were the first time that cerebral palsy athletes joined spinal cord injury, blind and amputees athletes at the Paralympics, Australia did not have a national organisation and did not send any cerebral palsy athletes.

Kevin Coombs was given the honour of captaining the entire Australian Team. In his biography, Coombs writes: “This was the biggest honour I had received. I had been an Australian team captain once before in 1974 at the Commonwealth Games in New Zealand, but this was the Paralympics.” These Games were Coombs' fourth, and he also captained the Australian Wheelchair Basketball team.

== Notable Performances ==
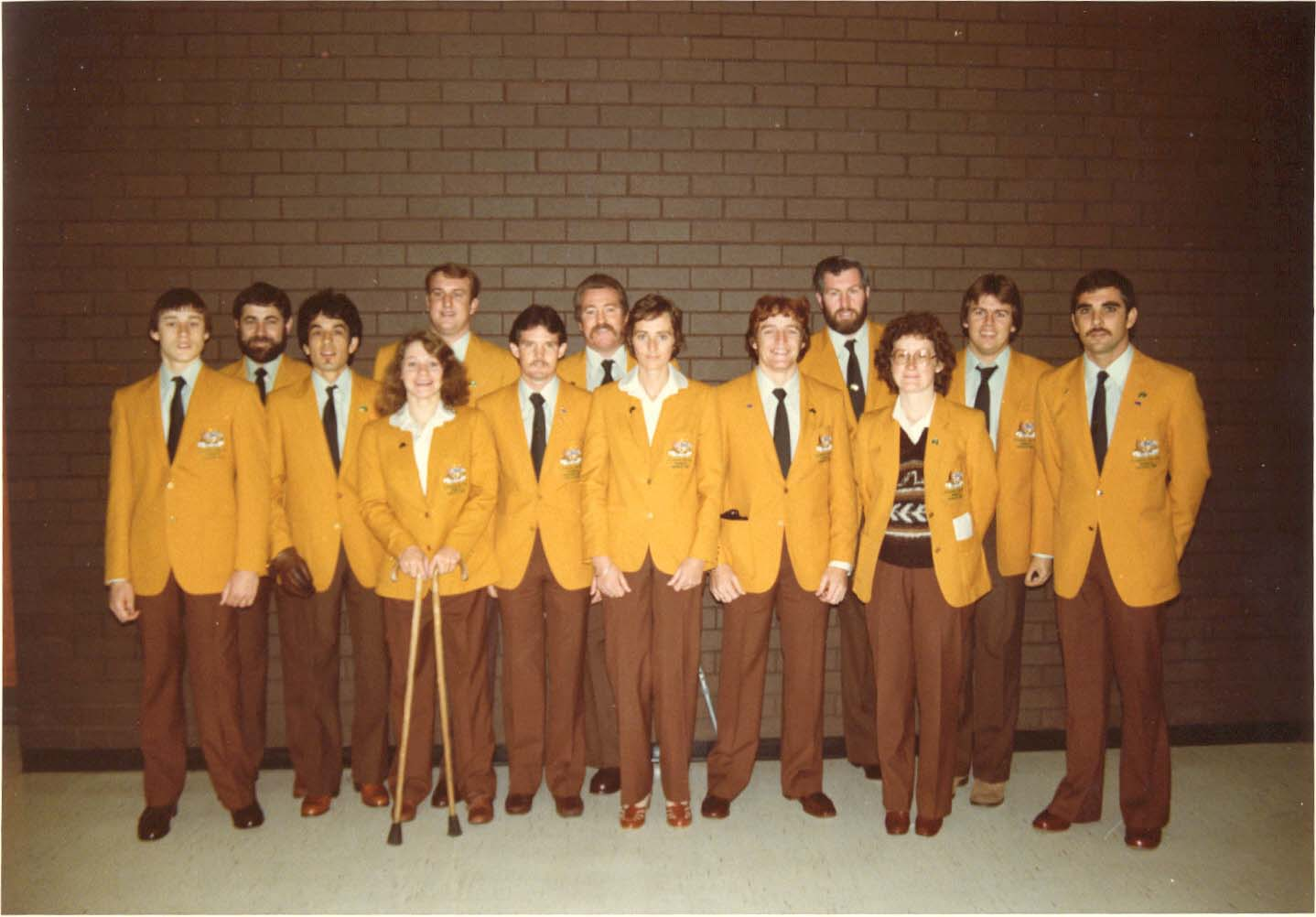
1980 Amputee Team - Holland 2

Notable Australian performances were:

In amputee athletes class

- Charmaine Cree - Charmaine won 5 medals in total for her performance in Athletics. She won gold in the Women's High Jump, silver in Women's Long Jump and three bronze medals in the Women's 100m, Women's Discus throw and Women's Javelin throw.
- Wayne Lanham - Wayne finished with two medals in athletics. He won a gold medal in the Men's 100m and a silver medal in the Men's 400m.
- Gary Gudgeon - Gary acquired four medals in total, all for swimming. He came away with a gold medal in the Men's 400m Freestyle, two silver medals in the Men's 100m backstroke and the Men's 4x50m individual medley, along with a bronze medal in the Men's 100m Freestyle.

In vision impaired athletes:

- Gloria Pascoe - Gloria secured a gold medal in the Women's Singles for Lawn Bowls. This was the only gold medal to be won in lawn bowls for blind athletes.
- Carolyn Connors - Carolyn came away with three medals, all won in swimming. She won two silver medals in the Women's 100m Butterfly and Women's 100m Freestyle, and a bronze medal in the Women's 4x50m Individual Medley.

In spinal cord injury athletes class:

- Wayne Patchett - Wayne victoriously won three gold medals in throwing. He placed first in Men's Club Throw, Men's Discus Throw and Men's Shot Put.
- Eric Russell - Eric acquired three medals in athletics. He won a gold medal in Men's Shot Put and two bronze medals in Men's Discus Throw and Men's Pentathlon.
- Michael Nugent - Michael successfully won two medals for his athletics performance. He won a gold medal in the Men's 200m, along with a silver medal in the Men's 400m. In conjunction with his gold medal winning performance in the Men's 200m, Michael managed to set the world record, making his performance the best individual performance by an Australian wheelchair athlete at the 1980 Games.
- Barbara Caspers - Competing in women's shooting, Barbara managed to win three medals overall. She won a gold medal in Mixed air rifle kneeling, a silver medal in Mixed air rifle 3 positions and a bronze medal in Mixed air rifle standing.
- Elizabeth Kosmala - Elizabeth competed in multiple shooting events and came away with three medals. She won a gold medal in Mixed air rifle prone and two silver medals in Mixed air rifle 3 positions and Mixed air rifle kneeling.
- Overall the Australian athletics team won 34 medals out of the 55 medals won by Australia.

== Medalists ==
Medal	Name	Sport	Event	State	Disability
Gold	Wayne Lanham	Athletics	Men's 100 m F	NSW	Amputee
Gold	Michael Nugent	Athletics	Men's 200 m 3	QLD	Wheelchair
Gold	Wayne Patchett	Athletics	Men's Club throw 1A	NSW	Wheelchair
Gold	Wayne Patchett	Athletics	Men's Discus throw 1A	NSW	Wheelchair
Gold	Wayne Patchett	Athletics	Men's Shot put 1A	NSW	Wheelchair
Gold	Murray Todd	Athletics	Men's Shot put 2	SA	Wheelchair
Gold	Eric Russell	Athletics	Men's Shot put 3	QLD	Wheelchair
Gold	Charmaine Cree	Athletics	Women's High jump C	NSW	Amputee
Gold	Gloria Pascoe	Lawn bowls	Women's Singles B	VIC	Wheelchair
Gold	Barbara Caspers	Shooting	Mixed air rifle kneeling 1A-1C	SA	Wheelchair
Gold	Elizabeth Kosmala	Shooting	Mixed air rifle prone 2-5	SA	Wheelchair
Gold	Gary Gudgeon	Swimming	Men's 400 m freestyle C-D	NSW	Amputee
Silver	Michael Nugent	Athletics	Men's 400 m 3	QLD	Wheelchair
Silver	Ian Trewhella	Archery	Men's Short Metric Round tetraplegic	ACT	Wheelchair
Silver	Wayne Lanham	Athletics	Men's 400 m F	NSW	Amputee
Silver	Erich Hubel	Athletics	Men's 800 m 5	VIC	Wheelchair
Silver	Ian Trewhella	Athletics	Men's Pentathlon 1B	ACT	Wheelchair
Silver	Sue Hobbs	Athletics	Women's 60 m 5	SA	Wheelchair
Silver	Sue Hobbs	Athletics	Women's 800 m 5	SA	Wheelchair
Silver	Sue Hobbs	Athletics	Women's 1500 m 5	SA	Wheelchair
Silver	Charmaine Cree	Athletics	Women's Long jump C	NSW	Amputee
Silver	Julie Russell	Athletics	Women's Pentathlon 3	SA	Wheelchair
Silver	Barbara Caspers	Shooting	Mixed air rifle 3 positions 1A-1C	SA	Wheelchair
Silver	Elizabeth Kosmala	Shooting	Mixed air rifle 3 positions 2-5	SA	Wheelchair
Silver	Elizabeth Kosmala	Shooting	Mixed air rifle kneeling 2-5	SA	Wheelchair
Silver	Peter Hill	Swimming	Men's 25 m backstroke 1C	QLD	Wheelchair
Silver	Peter Hill	Swimming	Men's 25 m breaststroke 1C	QLD	Wheelchair
Silver	Charlie Tapscott	Swimming	Men's 50 m backstroke J	TAS	Amputee
Silver	Charlie Tapscott	Swimming	Men's 50 m freestyle J	TAS	Amputee
Silver	Gary Gudgeon	Swimming	Men's 100 m backstroke C-D	NSW	Amputee
Silver	Gary Gudgeon	Swimming	Men's 4x50 m individual medley C	NSW	Amputee
Silver	Carolyn Connors	Swimming	Women's 100 m butterfly A	NSW	Vision Impairment
Silver	Carolyn Connors	Swimming	Women's 100 m freestyle A	NSW	Vision Impairment
Bronze	Chris Alp	Athletics	Men's 100 m 3	VIC	Wheelchair
Bronze	Chris Alp	Athletics	Men's 200 m 3	VIC	Wheelchair
Bronze	Richard Oliver	Athletics	Men's 100 m 4	SA	Wheelchair
Bronze	Erich Hubel	Athletics	Men's 100 m 5	VIC	Wheelchair
Bronze	Erich Hubel	Athletics	Men's 1500 m 5	VIC	Wheelchair
Bronze	Joe Egan	Athletics	Men's 100 m C	NSW	Amputee
Bronze	Joe Egan	Athletics	Men's 400 m C	NSW	Amputee
Bronze	Fred Pointer	Athletics	Men's 400 m 3	NSW	Wheelchair
Bronze	Fred Pointer	Athletics	Men's Slalom 3	NSW	Wheelchair
Bronze	Bruce Sandilands	Athletics	Men's 1500 m B	VIC	Vision Impairment
Bronze	Eric Russell	Athletics	Men's Discus throw 3	QLD	Wheelchair
Bronze	Eric Russell	Athletics	Men's Pentathlon 3	QLD	Wheelchair
Bronze	Rene Ahrens	Athletics	Men's Discus throw 5	QLD	Wheelchair
Bronze	Robert McIntyre	Athletics	Men's Slalom 5	VIC	Wheelchair
Bronze	Charmaine Cree	Athletics	Women's 100 m C	NSW	Amputee
Bronze	Charmaine Cree	Athletics	Women's Discus throw C	NSW	Amputee
Bronze	Charmaine Cree	Athletics	Women's Javelin throw C	NSW	Amputee
Bronze	Barbara Caspers	Shooting	Mixed air rifle standing 1A-1C	SA	Wheelchair
Bronze	Gary Gudgeon	Swimming	Men's 100 m freestyle C-D	NSW	Amputee
Bronze	Carolyn Connors	Swimming	Women's 4x50 m individual medley A	NSW	Vision Impairment
Bronze	Barry Kalms	Weightlifting	Men's lightweight -65 kg amputee	QLD	Amputee
Bronze	Brian McNicholl	Weightlifting	Men's middleweight -75 kg paraplegic	VIC	Wheelchair

Medals by discipline
Discipline	Gold medal	Silver medal	Bronze medal	Total
Archery	0	1	0	1
Athletics	8	9	17	34
Darchery	0	0	0	0
Goalball	0	0	0	0
Lawn bowls	1	0	0	1
Wheelchair fencing	0	0	0	0
Shooting	2	3	1	6
Swimming	1	8	2	11
Table tennis	0	0	0	0
Volleyball	0	0	0	0
Weightlifting	0	0	2	2
Wheelchair basketball	0	0	0	0
Total	12	21	22	55

== Events ==
=== Archery ===
There were fifteen Archery events at the Arnhem Games, ten for men and five for women. Australia won a silver medal through Ian Trewhella's performance in the Men's short metric round tetraplegic.

Australia represented by:
Men - Dennis Kennedy, Eric Klein, Ian Trewhella
Women – Susan Davies

=== Athletics ===
There were 275 Athletic events, 132 for women and 143 for men. Athletics was Australia's most successful team winning 34 medals - 8 gold, 9 silver and 17 bronze medals.

Australia represented by:
Men – Rene Ahrens, Chris Alp, Paul Bird, Kevin Bishop, Donald Dann, Joe Egan, Robert Faulkner, Peter Hill, Erich Hubel, Barry Kalms, Wayne Lanham, Peter Marsh, John Martin, Michael McFawn, Robert McIntyre, Jeff McNeil, Brian McNicholl, David McPherson, Kevin Munro, Michael Nugent, Richard Oliver, Wayne Patchett, Fred Pointer, Eric Russell, Bruce Sandilands, John Sheil, Murray Todd, Ian Trewhella, Robert Turner
Women – Charmaine Cree, Sue Hobbs, Julie Langhorne, Pam Nugent, Julie Russell, Janine Wilson

=== Dartchery ===
There is no record of Australia competing in Dartchery, which subsequently was removed from the Games after the completion of the 1980 Games.

Australia represented by:
Men - ?
Women - ?

=== Goalball ===
Goalball is an event for the visually impaired where they attempt to stop their opponents from scoring. A ball with bells inside is rolled by the opponent, and the competitor must use their hearing abilities to locate and stop the ball. At the 1980 Games, the only Goalball event offered was for male teams, and while Australia did compete, they were disqualified for an unknown reason.

Australia represented by:
Men - Robert Faulkner, David (Dave) Manera, Robert McIntyre, Bruce Sandilands

=== Lawn Bowls ===
Lawn Bowls consisted of a total of nineteen events, six for women and thirteen for men. Gloria Pascoe was the only Australian woman to compete and came away winning Australia's only gold medal in the Women's Singles B as she was the sole competitor.

Australia represented by:
Men – Mike McGuire, N. Hunter, E. Wratten
Women – Gloria Pascoe

=== Shooting ===
Shooting at the 1980 Games consisted of eleven events, one for solely men, one for women only and nine mixed events. Australia won 6 medals overall, winning two gold medals in the Mixed air rifle kneeling 1A-1C and the Mixed air rifle prone 2-5, three silver in the Mixed air rifle 3 positions 1A-1C, Mixed air rifle 3 positions 2-5 and the Mixed air rifle kneeling 2-5 and finally one bronze medal in the Mixed air rifle standing 1A-1C.

Australia represented by:
Women – Barbara Caspers, Elizabeth Kosmala
Men - Peter Pascoe

=== Swimming ===
There were 192 swimming events, 93 for women and 99 for men. Australian won 11 medals – 1 gold, 8 silver and 2 bronze medals. Gary Gudegeon won Australia's only gold medal in the Men's 400 m Freestyle C-D.

Australia represented by:
Men - Rene Andres, Paul Bird, Peter Carroll, Gary Gudgeon, Peter Hill, Dennis Kennedy, David (Dave) Manera, David McPherson, Charlie Tapscott
Women – Carolyn Connors, Maureen Pybus

=== Table Tennis ===
This year the field of Table Tennis offered 32 competitive events, 22 for men and 10 for women. Unfortunately Australia did not win any medals.

Australia represented by:
Men – Donald Dann, Peter Marsh, John Martin, John Sheil, Charlie Tapscott

=== Weightlifting ===
Weightlifting at the Arnhem Games consisted of eleven events, all for men. Out of Australian's three competitors, two came away with bronze medals. Barry Kalms placed third in the Men's lightweight 65 kg amputee event and Brian McNicholl won bronze in the Men's middleweight 75 kg paraplegic event.

Australia represented by:
Men – Barry Kalms, Brian McNicholl, John Sheil

=== Wheelchair Basketball ===
Unfortunately the basketball team was not overly successful, finishing in the middle of the pack. According to Kevin Coombes, the team faced many difficulties as they had only come together a few weeks beforehand and had little funding, which meant that all the team members and the coach had to work, leaving little time for training.

Australia did not win a medal. The results of their performance are as follows:

Wins: Australia v Denmark 55 – 33, Australia v Brazil 68 – 44 and Australia v Denmark 48 – 37.

Losses: United States v Australia 87 – 36, Japan v Australia 77 – 50, Spain v Australia 73 – 56, Great Britain v Australia 62 – 33 and Germany V Australia 58 – 49.

Australia represented by:
Men - Rene Ahrens, Robert Augustine, Kevin Bishop, Peter Burt, Kevin Coombs, Len Ettridge, Erich Hubel, Robert McIntyre, Brian McNicholl, Kevin Munro, Richard Oliver, Fred Pointer

== See also ==
- Australia at the Paralympics
