= List of multi-sport Australian Paralympians =

List of Australian Paralympians that have competed in multiple sports at the Summer or Winter Paralympic Games. Several athletes have competed at both the Winter and Summer Paralympics.

Five athletes have won gold medals in more than one sport:

- Daphne Ceeney - Swimming (1960) and Table tennis (1964)
- Vic Renalson - Athletics (1968) and Weightlifting (1968, 1972, 1976)
- Roy Fowler - Swimming (1964) and Lawn bowls (1984, 1988)
- Greg Smith - Athletics (2000) and Wheelchair rugby (2012)
- Dylan Alcott - Wheelchair basketball (2008) and Wheelchair tennis (2016)

Name	Sports and Summer/Winter Paralympic Games attended
Rene Ahrens	Athletics (1980, 1988), Wheelchair basketball (1980)
Dylan Alcott *	Wheelchair basketball (2008, 2012), Wheelchair tennis (2016)
Troy Andrews	Shooting (1984), Wheelchair basketball (1988, 1992, 1996, 2000)
Terry Biggs	Athletics (1980), Table tennis (1980)
Felix Blums	Archery (1968), Swimming (1968)
Anthony Biddle	Athletics (1996, 2000), Cycling (2004)
Paul Bird	Athletics (1980, 1984), Swimming (1980, 1984)
Anthony Bonaccurso	Alpine skiing (1998), Wheelchair tennis (2004)
Peter Burt	Athletics (1968), Wheelchair basketball (1980)
Daphne Ceeney *	Archery (1960, 1964, 1968), Athletics (1960, 1964), Swimming (1960, 1964, 1968), Table tennis (1964, 1968), Wheelchair fencing (1964, 1968)
Brian Chambers	Athletics (1968, 1972), Swimming (1968, 1972), Wheelchair basketball (1972)
Lyn Coleman	Athletics (1984, 1988), Boccia (1992, 1996, 2000), Swimming (1984)
Alan Conn *	Archery (1968, 1972), Dartchery (1968), Table tennis (1968)
Kevin Coombs	Athletics (1968, 1972), Table tennis (1968), Wheelchair basketball (1960, 1968, 1972, 1980)
Lionel Cousens	Archery (1964), Dartchery (1964)
Paul Croft	Athletics (1984, 1988, 1992), Table tennis (1998), Sitting volleyball (2000)
Garry Croker	Table tennis (1998), Wheelchair rugby (1996, 2000)
Kevin Cunningham	Athletics (1968), Wheelchair basketball (1960, 1968), Wheelchair fencing (1960)
Donald Dann	Athletics (1980, 1984), Table tennis (1980)
Daniela Di Toro	Table tennis (2016), Wheelchair tennis (1996, 2000, 2004, 2008, 2012)
Lorraine Dodd *	Athletics (1968), Swimming (1968), Table tennis (1968)
Michael Dow *	Athletics (1964), Swimming (1964), Weightlifting (1964)
Joe Egan	Athletics (1980, 1984, 1988), Standing volleyball (2000)
Craig Elliott	Athletics (1988), Cycling (1992)
Shane Elsmore	Athletics (1988), Football 7-a-side (1988)
Justin Eveson *	Swimming (2000), Wheelchair basketball (2004, 2008, 2012)
Robert Faulkner	Athletics (1976, 1980), Goalball (1980), Swimming (1976)
Wayne Flood	Archery (1976), Athletics (1976), Dartchery (1976), Lawn bowls (1976), Snooker (1976), Table tennis (1976), Wheelchair fencing (1976)
Roy Fowler *	Archery (1964, 1968, 1972), Dartchery (1964, 1968), Lawn bowls (1984, 1988), Swimming (1964)
Amanda Fraser *	Athletics (2004, 2008), Swimming (2000)
Trevor French	Archery (1964), Dartchery (1964), Swimming (1964)
Jessica Gallagher *	Athletics (2012), Alpine skiing (2010, 2014), Cycling (2016)
Terry Giddy	Athletics (1972, 1984, 1988, 1992, 1996), Wheelchair basketball (1972)
Kyrra Grunnsund	Alpine skiing (1980, 1984, 1988, 1992), Athletics (1992), Cross-country skiing (1980)
Greg Hammond	Swimming (1984, 1988), Standing volleyball (2000)
James Handbridge	Lawns bowls (1976), Shooting (1976)
Paul Harpur	Athletics (2004), Goalball (2000)
Jeff Heath	Archery (1976), Dartchery (1976)
Geoffrey Hill	Athletics (1988), Football 7-a-side (1988)
Brett Holcombe	Athletics (1984), Standing volleyball (2000)
Gary Hooper *	Athletics (1960, 1964, 1968), Swimming (1964, 1968), Weightlifting (1964, 1968), Wheelchair fencing (1964, 1968); Wheelchair basketball (1960),
Erich Hubel	Athletics (1980), Wheelchair basketball (1980, 1984, 1988)
Cherrie Ireland	Athletics (1968, 1972), Swimming (1968, 1972), Table Tennis (1968)
Dennis Kay	Athletics (1972, 1976), Weightlifting (1972)
John Kestel *	Athletics (1976), Dartchery (1976)
John Kidd	Athletics (1976), Wheelchair basketball (1976)
Elizabeth Kosmala *	Archery (1976), Athletics (1972), Dartchery (1976), Shooting (1976 - 2016), Swimming (1972)
Stan Kosmala	Athletics (1976), Lawn bowls (1988), Shooting (2000), Wheelchair basketball (1976)
Warren Lawton	Athletics (1984), Goalball (1992, 1996, 2000)
Ray Letheby	Table tennis (1976), Wheelchair basketball (1976)
Deahnne McIntyre	Athletics (1988), Powerlifting (2000, 2004, 2008)
Robert McIntyre	Athletics (1968, 1972, 1980, 1984), Goalball (1980), Wheelchair basketball (1968, 1972, 1976, 1980)
Claire McLean	Cycling (2004), Triathlon (2016)
John Maclean	Athletics (2000), Rowing (2008)
Allan McLucas	Archery (1964, 1968), Athletics (1968), Swimming (1964, 1968), Table tennis (1964)
Brian McNicholl	Athletics (1976, 1980), Powerlifting (1992, 1996), Weightlifting (1976, 1980, 1984, 1988), Wheelchair basketball (1980)
Eric Magennis	Archery (1972), Lawn bowls (1972, 1976, 1984)
Bob McMillan	Athletics (1972), Table tennis (1972)
Bill Mather-Brown	Athletics (1964, 1968), Swimming (1968), Table tennis (1960, 1968), Weightlifting (1964), Wheelchair basketball (1960, 1968); Wheelchair fencing (1960, 1964)
John Martin *	Archery (1964), Athletics (1964, 1968, 1972, 1976), Dartchery (1964), Swimming (1964); Table tennis (1968, 1976,1980), Wheelchair basketball (1968, 1972, 1976), Wheelchair fencing (1968)
Terry Mason*	Athletics (1972, 1976), Weightlifting (1972, 1976)
James Millar	Biathlon (2006), Cross-country skiing (2006, 2010)
Michael Milton	Alpine skiing (1988, 1992, 1994, 2002, 2006), Cycling (2008)
Kieran Modra *	Athletics (1988, 1992), Cycling (1996, 2000, 2004, 2008, 2012, 2016), Swimming (1992)
Dominic Monypenny	Alpine skiing (2010), Rowing (2008)
Bruno Moretti*	Athletics (1968), Table tennis (1960, 1968), Wheelchair basketball (1960, 1968, 1984)
Kevin Munro	Athletics (1968, 1980), Wheelchair basketball (1980)
John 'Jimmy' Newton*	Athletics (1968), Table tennis (1968), Wheelchair fencing (1968), Lawn Bowls (1984)
Richard Nicholson *	Athletics (2000, 2004, 2008, 2012), Powerlifting (1996, 2000)
Marion O'Brien *	Athletics (1964, 1968), Table tennis (1964, 1968)
Richard Oliver *	Athletics (1976, 1980), Wheelchair basketball (1976, 1980, 1984, 1988, 1992, 1996)
Craig Parsons	Table tennis (1988), Wheelchair rugby (2000)
Simon Patmore *	Athletics (2012), Snowboarding (2018)
Hugh Patterson	Athletics (1972), Wheelchair basketball (1972)
Fred Pointer	Athletics (1980), Wheelchair basketball (1980)
Frank Ponta *	Archery (1960), Athletics (1960, 1964, 1968, 1972, 1976), Swimming (1964, 1968), Wheelchair basketball (1960, 1968, 1972, 1976); Wheelchair fencing (1960, 1964)
Amanda Reid	Cycling (2016), Swimming (2012)
Vic Renalson *	Athletics (1964, 1968, 1972, 1976), Weightlifting (1964, 1968, 1972)
Prue Reynalds	Athletics (1984), Cycling (1992)
Cliff Rickard	Athletics (1972), Snooker (1972), Table tennis (1972)
Jaime Romaguera	Athletics (1988, 1992, 1996), Football 7-a-side (1988)
Margaret Ross	Archery (1972, 1976), Dartchery (1976)
Eric Russell	Athletics (1976, 1980, 1992), Wheelchair basketball (1976)
Julie Russell	Athletics (1980, 1984, 1988), Powerlifting (2000), Wheelchair basketball (1992)
Victor Salvemini	Archery (1972), Athletics (1972), Wheelchair basketball (1972, 1976)
Bruce Sandilands	Athletics (1980), Goalball (1980)
Chris Scott	Athletics (1992), Cycling (1996, 2000, 2004, 2008), Football 7-a-side (1988)
Ralph Scott	Athletics (1988), Football 7-a-side (1988)
Elaine Schreiber *	Athletics (1964, 1968, 1972, 1976), Table tennis (1964, 1968, 1972, 1976)
John Sheil	Athletics (1980, 1984), Table tennis (1980, 1988), Weightlifting (1980)
Greg Smith *	Athletics (1992, 1996, 2000), Wheelchair rugby (2008, 2012)
Jeff Simmonds	Athletics (1968), Swimming (1968)
Pam Smith	Archery (1968, 1972), Athletics (1968, 1972), Table tennis (1968), Wheelchair fencing (1968)
Ross Soutar	Archery (1976), Athletics (1976), Table tennis (1976)
Tony South *	Archery (1968, 1972), Dartchery (1968), Table tennis (1968)
Liesl Tesch *	Sailing (2012, 2016), Wheelchair basketball (1992, 1996, 2000, 2004, 2018)
Bruce Thwaite	Lawn bowls (1976), Swimming (1964), Weightlifting (1964)
Suzanne Twelftree	Powerlifting (2000), Wheelchair tennis (1992)
Ian Trewhella *	Archery (1980, 1984), Athletics (1980)
Don Watts	Swimming (1968), Table tennis (1968), Wheelchair basketball(1968)
Mark Whiteman	Athletics (1992), Standing volleyball (2000)
Jodi Willis-Roberts	Athletics (1992, 1996, 2000, 2004, 2008), Goalball (1988, 1992)
Di Workman	Archery (1968), Athletics (1968), Wheelchair fencing (1968)

(*) athletes who have won medals in more than one sport

== See also ==
- Australia at the Paralympics
- Australia at the Winter Paralympics
- Australia at the Summer Paralympics
