= Athletics at the 1976 Summer Paralympics – Men's 60 metres 1A =

Men's 60 metres 1B at the V Paralympic Games
- Paralympic Athletics
- Competitors: 10 from 8 nations

Medalists
1st place, gold medalist(s)		Juan Almaraz	Mexico
2nd place, silver medalist(s)		Francisco de las Fuentes	Mexico
3rd place, bronze medalist(s)		Peter Marsh	Australia

The Men's 60 metres 1A was one of the events held in Athletics at the 1976 Summer Paralympics in Toronto.

There were 10 competitors in the heat; 6 made it into the final.

Mexican athlete Juan Almaraz won the gold medal ahead of his fellow Mexican, Francisco de las Fuentes.

== Results ==
=== Final ===
Place	Athlete	Time
1	Juan Almaraz (MEX)	20.3
2	Francisco de las Fuentes (MEX)	22.0
3	Peter Marsh (AUS)	23.4
4	Jan Erik Stenberg (NOR)	23.5
5	Rod Vleiger (USA)	25.4
6	D. Bovee (CAN)	25.6
