= Dartchery at the 1976 Summer Paralympics =

Dartchery at the V Paralympic Games
- Venue: Centennial Park Fields

Dartchery at the 1976 Summer Paralympics consisted of three events. The competition was held at the Centennial Park Fields in Toronto, Ontario, Canada.

== Medal table ==
* Host nation (Canada)

Rank	Nation	Gold	Silver	Bronze	Total
1	United States	1	1	0	2
2	Australia	1	0	0	1
2	France	1	0	0	1
4	Finland	0	1	0	1
4	Great Britain	0	1	0	1
6	Belgium	0	0	1	1
6	Netherlands	0	0	1	1
6	South Africa	0	0	1	1
Totals (8 entries)		3	3	3	9

== Medal summary ==
Event	Gold	Silver	Bronze
Men's pairs open	France; A. Piutti; Thore	United States; Patrick Krishner; Timothy van der Meiden	Netherlands; Pieter Blanker; Popke Popkema
Mixed pairs open	Australia; John Kestel; Margaret Ross	Finland; Arvo Kalenius; Elli Korva	Belgium; Aime Desal; Alice Verhee
Women's pairs open	United States; Susan Hagel; Rhonda July	Great Britain; M. Cooper; Margaret Maughan	South Africa; R. Alexander; Margaret Harriman
