= Margaret Ross =

Margaret Ross may refer to:

- Margaret Clunies Ross (born 1942), Australian medievalist
- Margaret Ross (computer scientist), professor of software quality at Southampton Solent University
- Margaret Ross (Paralympian), Australian Paralympian
