= Lawn bowls at the 1976 Summer Paralympics =

Lawn bowls at the V Paralympic Games
- Paralympic Lawn bowls
- Venue: Etobicoke Lawn Bowling Club

Lawn bowls at the 1976 Summer Paralympics consisted of sixteen events, twelve for men and four for women. The competition was held at the Etobicoke Lawn Bowling Club in Toronto, Ontario, Canada.

== Medal summary ==
=== Medal table ===
* Host nation (Canada)

| Rank | Nation | Gold | Silver | Bronze | Total |
|---|---|---|---|---|---|
| 1 | Great Britain | 4 | 6 | 6 | 16 |
| 2 | Australia | 3 | 2 | 0 | 5 |
| 3 | Canada* | 3 | 0 | 1 | 4 |
| 4 | South Africa | 2 | 1 | 0 | 3 |
| 5 | France | 1 | 0 | 0 | 1 |
| 5 | Indonesia | 1 | 0 | 0 | 1 |
| 5 | Japan | 1 | 0 | 0 | 1 |
| 5 | United States | 1 | 0 | 0 | 1 |
| 9 | Austria | 0 | 2 | 0 | 2 |
| 10 | Brazil | 0 | 1 | 0 | 1 |
| Totals (10 entries) | | 16 | 12 | 7 | 35 |

=== Men's events ===
| Event | Gold | Silver | Bronze |
|---|---|---|---|
| Singles A | Robert Farmer; Australia | William McLeod; Great Britain | Jacques Pilon; Canada |
| Singles B | P. Lynn; Canada | G. Morgan; Great Britain | None |
| Singles C | F. Widgory; Canada | J. Handbirdge; Australia | Ron Miller; Great Britain |
| Singles C1 | Harunori Wakita; Japan | None | None |
| Singles D | Peter Pienerosa; Great Britain | Kanda; Austria | None |
| Singles D1 | M. Johnson; United States | D. Hoddleston; South Africa | None |
| Singles E | Syarifuddin; Indonesia | None | None |
| Singles wh | Michael Shelton; Great Britain | Engelbert Rangger; Austria | Michael McCreadie; Great Britain |
| Pairs B | Canada; Victor Goetz; P. Lynn | None | None |
| Pairs C | Great Britain; James Anderson; Ron Miller | None | None |
| Pairs D | France; P. Chassagne; Leon Sur | Great Britain; James Gladman; Peter Pienerosa | None |
| Pairs wh | Australia; Eric Magennis; Bruce Thwaite | Brazil; Robson S. Almeida; Luiz Carlos Costa | Great Britain; David Avis; Michael McCreadie |

=== Women's events ===
| Event | Gold | Silver | Bronze |
|---|---|---|---|
| Singles B | Kate Bonnett; Great Britain | Charmaine Smith; Australia | Iris Baker; Great Britain |
| Singles wh | Margaret Harriman; South Africa | Gill Matthews; Great Britain | Gwen Buck; Great Britain |
| Pairs B | Australia; Adele Jackson; Charmaine Smith | Great Britain; Iris Baker; Kate Bonnett | None |
| Pairs wh | South Africa; R. Alexander; Margaret Harriman | Great Britain; Margaret Maughan; Irene Nowak | Great Britain; Gwen Buck; Gill Matthews |
