= Harry Mosby =

Australian Paralympic athlete

Harry Moseby
Personal information
- Full name: Harry Walter Mosby
- Nationality: Australia
- Born: 3 May 1945
- Died: 17 November 1993 (aged 48)
Medal record
Athletics
Paralympic Games
Silver medal – second place	1976 Toronto	Men's Discus 1C

Harry Walter Mosby (3 May 1945 – 17 November 1993), also known as Harry Moseby, is an Australian Paralympic athlete from the Torres Strait. At the 1976 Toronto Games, he won a silver medal in the Men's Discus 1C event and finished fourth in the Men's Javelin C1, fifth in the Men's Shot Put C1 and twelfth in the Men's Precision Javelin C1.

Mosby was born on Yorke Island, or Masig, in the Torres Strait. He was the eldest son of Jack Johnson Mosby (10 June 1910 – 25 October 2001) and Mabel (Alau) Mosby (4 April 1929 – 26 October 1986). In the 1960s, along with many other Torres Strait Islander men, he travelled to Western Australia to work on building the inland railway between remote desert mines in the Pilbara region and ports on the coast. In 1966, aged 21, he lost both legs in a train accident in the Pilbara.

During four years of rehabilitation and occupational therapy in Perth, Mosby was introduced to sport, and participated in various events at Royal Perth Hospital sports days from 1966 to 1969. He won the Dartchery doubles champion in 1966 (with J. Pearson); 1967 (with D. Haddon); and 1969 (with T. Neville). Also in 1966, he was the archery champion in the St Nicholas round.

Mosby also began playing wheelchair basketball in Perth. As a member of the Blue Jays team in the basketball grand final in 1973, he was awarded the JM Saunders trophy for fairest and best player.

Less than a year before the 1976 Toronto Games in Toronto, Canada, Mosby began training for track and field events in Perth and was selected for the Australian team. He was one of 6 competitors and coaches from Western Australia in those Games: wheelchair basketballers Frank Ponta and Victor Salvemini and their coach and team escort, Les Mathews from Wheelchair Sports Western Australia, and Doug Rupe and Paul Gianni representing visually impaired athletes.

Mosby’s teammate Frank Ponta recalled him as a "Thursday Islander" and a "big tall man" competing in Toronto against "Scandinavian guys who were even bigger than him". Mosby remembered the winner, Finland’s Tauno Mannila, and expressed surprise that he’d placed second after only three months of training.

After the Games, Mosby returned to the Torres Strait. He lived on Thursday Island for the rest of his life, and was well known as a taxi driver. He was celebrated locally in 1993 as one of only three Thursday Islanders to win a medal in international sporting competition; the others were artistic gymnast Kylie Shadbolt, whose parents ran the Grand Hotel, and Olympic basketballer Danny Morseu.
