= Charmaine Smith =

Charmaine Smith may refer to:

- Charmaine Smith (bowls), Australian Paralympic lawn bowler
- Charmaine Smith (rugby union) (born 1990), New Zealand rugby union player
