= Robert Faulkner =

Robert Faulkner may refer to:

- Roy Faulkner (Robert Faulkner, 1897–?), Canadian association football player
- Robert Faulkner (Paralympian) (born 1958), Australian Paralympian
- Robert Faulkner (Assassin's Creed), a fictional character
