= Athletics at the 1976 Summer Paralympics – Men's 100 metres B =

Men's 100 metres B at the V Paralympic Games
- Paralympic Athletics
- Competitors: 31 from 17 nations

Medalists
1st place, gold medalist(s)		Winford Haynes	United States
2nd place, silver medalist(s)		V. Faulkner	Australia
3rd place, bronze medalist(s)		P. Gianni	Australia

The Men's 100 metres B was a sprinting event in athletics at the 1976 Summer Paralympics in Toronto for blind athletes. (Visually impaired athletes may also have been permitted to take part; the specifics are unclear from the International Paralympic Committee's records.) It was the first time that sprinting events had taken place for athletes other than wheelchair athletes.

Thirty-one athletes from seventeen nations competed in the heats, and the top six advanced to the final. Two athletes ran under twelve seconds in the heats: Winford Haynes of the United States (11.6s) and Mats Lindblad of Sweden (11.8s). They were joined in the final by Norway's Terje Hansen (12.0s) and by three athletes who had run their heat in 12.1s. In the final, Haynes won gold in 11.4s, a tenth of a second ahead of Australian athletes Faulkner and Gianni, who finished almost simultaneously for silver and bronze. Hansen was fourth, while Lindblad withdrew before the final.

== Results ==
=== Final ===
Place	Athlete	Time
1	Winford Haynes (USA)	11.4
2	V. Faulkner (AUS)	11.5
3	P. Gianni (AUS)	11.5
4	Terje Hansen (NOR)	11.8
5	D. Kenney (CAN)	12.3
–	Mats Lindblad (SWE)	dns
