= Fred Nitz =

Australian wheelchair athlete

Fred Nitz (born 2 July 1946) is a wheelchair athlete from Queensland who represented Australia at the 1982 Far East and South Pacific (FESPIC) Games for the Disabled in Hong Kong winning three gold medals and 2 silver medals.

== Personal ==
Nitz was born in the Queensland town of Monto, Queensland on 3 July 1946 and spent his school years in Rockhampton, Queensland. Following completion of a plumbing apprenticeship, he became a licensed plumber in 1966. A motor vehicle accident at Mount Larcom, Queensland in 1969 left him paraplegic. In the following year he competed in the 6th Wheelchair Nationals, in Melbourne, which was the start of a long sporting career. Nitz married after returning to Australia from the FESPIC Games in Hong Kong in 1982. His wife, Dr Jennifer Nitz, who established a career in clinical lecturing and research in physiotherapy at the University of Queensland, provided him with the support, assistance and professional training and guidance without which he could never have continued on with his sport.

== Sporting career ==
Following his accident in 1969, Nitz became active in the sports club that had been formed within the Paraplegic Welfare Association in Queensland in the 1960s. He has been a member of the Sporting Wheelies and Disabled Association since the prior club reformed in 1977. At the 1982 Far East and South Pacific (FESPIC) Games for the Disabled in Hong Kong, Nitz medalled in all of his events, winning 3 golds (200m, 400m and 4 × 400 m) and 2 silvers (100m and 1500m Paraplegic 2 class). As one of 157 Australian athletes to compete in 1982, his record contributed significantly to Australia's win of 315 medals at those games. As a long-term member of the Sporting Wheelies and Disabled Association, Nitz also represented Queensland in the following major sporting events:

- 6th Wheelchair Nationals, Melbourne 1970
- 7th Wheelchair Nationals, Sydney 1972
- 8th Wheelchair Nationals, Adelaide 1973
- 9th Wheelchair Nationals, Brisbane 1976
- 12th Wheelchair Nationals, Melbourne 1981
- 13th Wheelchair Nationals, Sydney 1984
- National Wheelchair Basketball Championships, Perth 1987
- 8th National Wheelchair Basketball Championships, Sydney 1991
- 17th Wheelchair Nationals, Adelaide 1992
- National Wheelchair Basketball team, 1992
- National Wheelchair Basketball Championships, Gold Coast 1993

Nitz was also a member of the Queensland Para-Cycling Committee for five years from 2009 before resigning. In his last competitive event, representing Queensland in a 50-kilometre hand cycling race at the 2002 national titles in Sydney, he finished the course coming last but also achieved his personal best time.

== Working career ==
In 1991, Nitz established Nitz Hydraulic Services to assist contractors with estimating, contract administration and design work. In 2019, he was recognised by the Master Plumbers' Association of Queensland for reaching his twenty-five-year milestone with the association.

== Recognition ==
In 1996, Nitz was inducted into the Sporting Wheelies Basketball Hall of Fame.
