= Roy Kubig =

Australian Paralympic swimmer

Personal information
- Nationality: Australian
- Born: 25 December 1958 (age 67) Home Hill, Queensland, Australia
Medal record
Men's swimming
Representing Australia
Paralympic Games
Bronze medal – third place	1976 Toronto	50 m backstroke 3

Roy Kubig (born 25 December 1958) is an Australian Paralympic swimmer. At the 1976 Toronto Games, he competed in five swimming events and he won a bronze medal in the Men's 50 m Backstroke 3 event.

Roy was born in Home Hill, Queensland, Australia. He attended Home Hill State High School and started his career competing against able-bodied swimmers at Home Hill Swimming Club.
