= Peter Pascoe =

Australian Paralympic athlete

Peter Pascoe (born 1953) is an Australian Paralympic athlete. He was the only Australian male athlete to compete in shooting events at the 1980 Summer Paralympics in the Netherlands. He competed at the Stoke Mandeville Games in England and National Paraplegic & Quadriplegic Games.

== Personal ==
Pascoe was born in 1953. During his childhood years he contracted Polio while living in the Adelaide suburb of Clarence Gardens, South Australia.

== Career ==
In 1983, at the 32nd Stoke Mandeville Games Aylesbury in England, Pascoe competed in air pistol shooting, class 2–6, finished in 11th position in the final round with a score of 515 points.

At the 1980 Summer Paralympics held in the Netherlands, Pascoe competed in air pistol shooting events.

Prior to 1983, Pascoe competed at a number of Australian National Paraplegic & Quadriplegic Games. At the 12th National Games Melbourne, in 1981, he finished in 2nd position in the Open division air pistol shooting, 1 silver medal – B Team basketball. At the 11th National Paraplegic & Quadriplegic Games held in Melville Western Australia in 1979, Pascoe competed in air pistol shooting, air rifle shooting and B Team basketball events. At the 10th National Paraplegic & Quadriplegic Games held in Hobart Tasmania, in 1977, Pascoe competed in three sports. Shot Put, 1 silver medal – B Team basketball, 1 silver medal – weightlifting. There were five novice members in this team including Pascoe. He was acknowledged for his personal best in weightlifting.
