= Charlie Tapscott =

Personal information
- Full name: Charles Tapscott
- Nationality: Australia
- Born: Wollongong, New South Wales, Australia
- Died: 18/12/1993
Medal record
Men's swimming
Representing Australia
Paralympic Games
Silver medal – second place	1980 Arnhem	Men's 50 m Backstroke J
Silver medal – second place	1980 Arnhem	Men's 50 m Freestyle J

Charlie Tapscott is an Australian Paralympic amputee swimmer and table tennis player from Wollongong, New South Wales. At the 1980 Arnhem Games, he competed in swimming and table tennis, winning two silver medals in Men's 50 m Backstroke J and Men's 50 m Freestyle J events.

He was inducted into New South Wales Hall of Champions. In 1981, he went on a hunger strike outside New South Wales Government Insurance Office over a damages award.
