= Carolyn Connors =

Australian Paralympic swimmer

Personal information
- Nationality: Australia
Medal record
Swimming
Paralympic Games
Silver medal – second place	1980 Arnhem	Women's 100 m Butterfly A
Silver medal – second place	1980 Arnhem	Women's 100 m Freestyle A
Bronze medal – third place	1980 Arnhem	Women's 4x50 m Individual Medley A

Carolyn Connors (born 1960/1961) is an Australian Paralympic swimmer with a vision impairment. She comes from Newcastle and has been blind since birth. She began competitive swimming at the age of 12. At the 1980 Arnhem Paralympics, where she was the only female Australian swimmer to be selected, she won two silver medals in the Women's 100 m Butterfly A and Women's 100 m Freestyle A events and a bronze medal in the Women's 4x50 m Individual Medley A event. She participated in the 1977 and 1982 FESPIC Games, winning four gold medals in the latter competition, and won 20 swimming gold medals throughout her career. She also broke a world record in the 100 m butterfly at the National Blind Swimming Championships in 1980. Her first swimming coach was Dennis Day and she was later coached by Eric Arnold.

She completed a year-long course at a teacher's college and was then told that she would not be allowed to do the practical teaching component. After the teaching course she studied at the University of Newcastle, and was named the university's sportsperson of the year in 1981. In 1983, she switched from swimming to athletics to allow herself more time to concentrate on her studies.
