= Tracey Freeman =

Australian Paralympic athlete (1948–2023)

Personal information
- Full name: Susan Marjory Freeman
- Nationality: Australia
- Born: 10 January 1948
- Died: 4 October 2023 (aged 75) Gladstone, Queensland, Australia
Medal record
Athletics
Paralympic Games
Gold medal – first place	1972 Heidelberg	Women's Discus 1B
Gold medal – first place	1972 Heidelberg	Women's Javelin 1B
Gold medal – first place	1972 Heidelberg	Women's Shot Put 1B
Gold medal – first place	1976 Toronto	Women's 60 m 1C
Gold medal – first place	1976 Toronto	Women's Javelin 1C
Gold medal – first place	1976 Toronto	Women's Shot Put 1C
Silver medal – second place	1972 Heidelberg	Women's 60 m Wheelchair 1B
Silver medal – second place	1972 Heidelberg	Women's Slalom 1B
Silver medal – second place	1976 Toronto	Women's Discus 1C
Silver medal – second place	1976 Toronto	Women's Javelin 1C

Susan Marjory "Tracey" Freeman (née Lumby; 10 January 1948 – 4 October 2023) was an Australian Paralympic athlete who won ten medals at two Paralympics.

== Personal life ==
Freeman was born on 10 January 1948 and became a quadriplegic due to polio at the age of two in 1951, while living in the Queensland city of Mount Isa. She went to the Crippled Children's Centre in the Sydney suburb of Redfern until the age of 15, when she moved to the Mt Wilga Rehabilitation Centre. She developed a passion for sports competition, having been introduced to archery, field events and swimming during her rehabilitation. She then moved with her family back to Queensland and spent time at the Kingsholm Rehabilitation Centre in Brisbane. She married Warren Freeman shortly before the 1972 Heidelberg Paralympics and they had two children.

Freeman died in the Queensland city of Gladstone on 4 October 2023, at the age of 75.

== Career ==
Freeman's first national competition was the National Wheelchair Games in Sydney, where she won all the events she entered; she broke Australian records in discus, javelin, shot put and the 60 m sprint, and won a gold medal in table tennis. She was therefore selected for a place in the Australian team at the 1972 Heidelberg Paralympics, where she won three gold medals and broke world records in the Women's Discus 1B, Women's Javelin 1B, and Women's Shot Put 1B events, and two silver medals in the Women's 60 m Wheelchair 1B and Women's Slalom 1B events. She was the most successful athlete at the games, the first Australian woman to win a gold medal at a Paralympic athletics competition, and one of Australia's first high-profile Paralympic competitors.

Freeman defended her national titles in athletics events at the 1973 National Wheelchair Games in Adelaide and won a gold medal in the wheelchair slalom. She won four gold medals in shot put, discus, javelin, and slalom and broke world records in the first two events at the 1974 Commonwealth Paraplegic Games in Dunedin. The next year, she won gold medals in the discus and shot put and silver medals in the 60 m and slalom at the 1975 FESPIC Games in Japan. At the 1976 Toronto Games, she won three gold medals and three world records in the Women's 60 m 1C, Women's Javelin 1C, and Women's Shot Put 1C events, and two silver medals in the Women's Discus 1C and Women's Slalom 1C events. She hoped to participate in the 1980 Arnhem Paralympics but a car accident just before the games forced her to withdraw from the competition. She made a comeback in the early 1990s, when she once again won medals in national competitions and set Australian records, before retiring in early 1996.

== Recognition ==
In 1976, Freeman became the first athlete with a disability to win The Courier-Mail Sportswoman of the Year award. In 2000, she received an Australian Sports Medal. In December 2016, Freeman was inducted into the Australian Paralympic Hall of Fame.
