= Charmaine Cree =

Australian athlete

Personal information
- Nationality: Australia
- Born: 1952 (age 73–74)
Medal record
Athletics
Paralympic Games
Gold medal – first place	1980 Arnhem	Women's High Jump C
Silver medal – second place	1980 Arnhem	Women's Long Jump C
Bronze medal – third place	1980 Arnhem	Women's 100 m C
Bronze medal – third place	1980 Arnhem	Women's Discus C
Bronze medal – third place	1980 Arnhem	Women's Javelin C

Charmaine Cree (born 1952) is an Australian athlete who won five medals at the 1980 Arnhem Paralympics

== Personal ==
In 1976, when she was 24, Cree had her left leg amputated below the knee due to bone cancer. She has two sons, who were aged seven and nine in 1979. They nicknamed her "The only bionic Mum in Sydney"; they also trained in athletics with her.

== Career ==
A year after her operation, Cree won five medals at the Australian Amputee Sporting Association's New South Wales competition. She then won two gold medals at the 1977 FESPIC Games, and won six gold medals in the Australian Amputee Sporting Association's Queensland championships in 1979. At the 1980 Arnhem Paralympics, she won a gold medal in the Women's High Jump C event, a silver medal in the Women's Long Jump C event, and three bronze medals in the Women's 100 m C, Women's Discus C, and Women's Javelin C events.

== Recognition ==
In 1980, Cree was named the New South Wales Sportswoman of the Year. She received an Australian Sports Medal in 2000.
