= Margaret Ross (computer scientist) =

British computer scientist

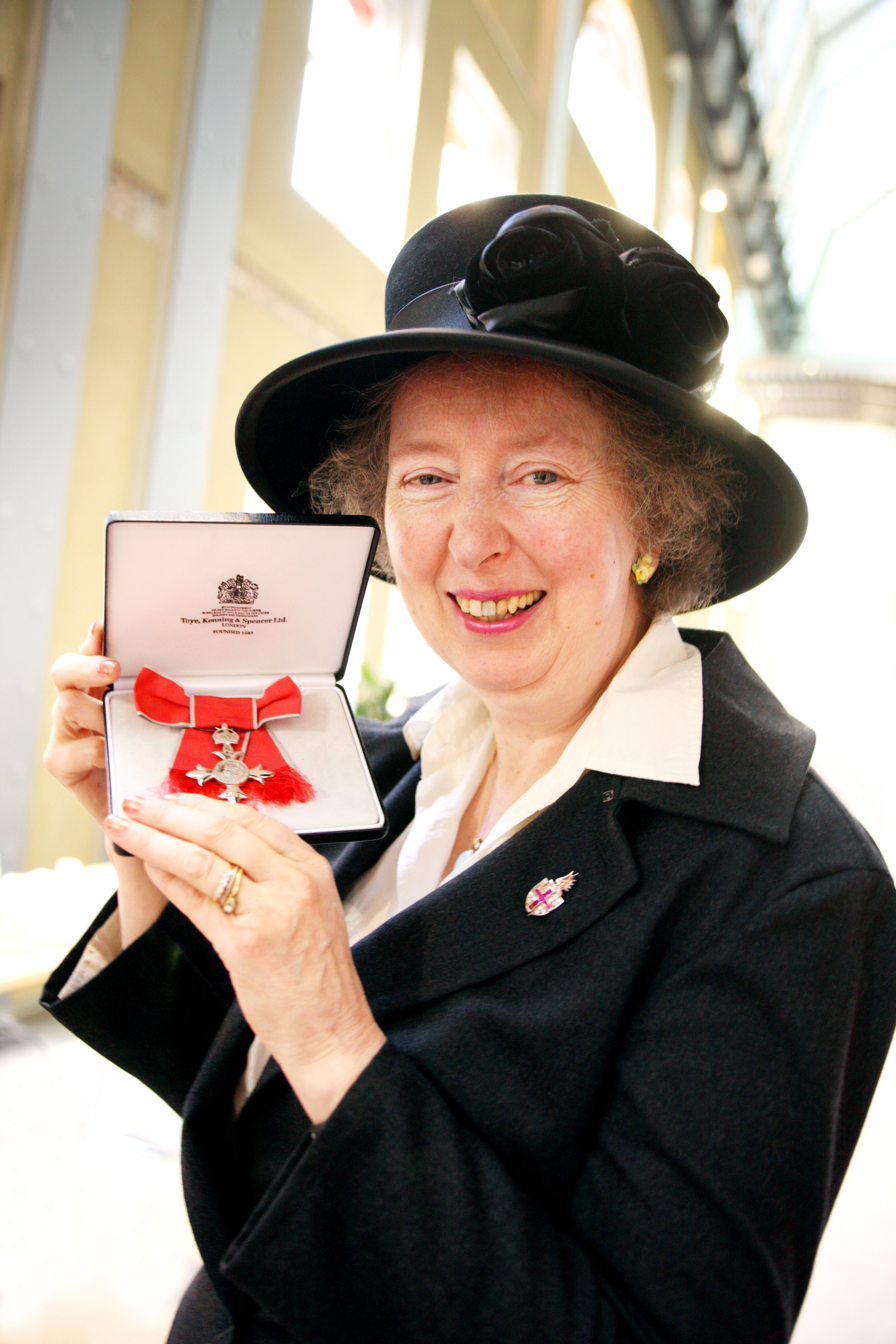
Margaret Ross with her MBE in the British Computer Society Atrium

Margaret Ross MBE is an emeritus professor of software quality at Southampton Solent University. She was awarded an Honorary Doctorate from Staffordshire University, Hon FBCS and the John Ivison Award from the BCS. Ross's service to higher education was recognised in 2008 with an MBE.

== Professional qualifications ==
- Fellow of the British Computer Society (FBCS)
- European Engineer (Eur Ing)
- Fellow of the Higher Education Academy
- Chartered IT Professional (CITP)
- Chartered Engineer (CEng)
- Chartered Scientist (CSci)

== Appointments ==
- Conference Director of the annual series of BCS Software Quality Management international conferences (since 1992)
- Conference Director of the annual series of international educational BCS INSPIRE conferences (since 1995)
- Member of the editorial board, and previously associate editor, Europe, for the Software Quality Journal

Ross serves on British Computer Society's BCSWomen committee, a specialist group for networking and sharing knowledge amongst women computing professionals.

== Awards ==
- Honorary Doctorate (2004), Staffordshire University.
- Freeman of the City of London
- Liveryman of the Worshipful Company of Engineers.
- John Ivison Award from the BCS.
- MBE awarded at Buckingham Palace for Services to higher education, in June 2008, by Prince Charles as part of the Queens Birthday Honours List.
- One of 30 women identified in the BCS Women in IT Campaign in 2014 source http://www.bcs.org/content/conWebDoc/50200. Who were then featured in the e-book "Women in IT: Inspiring the next generation" produced by the BCS, The Chartered Institute for IT, as a free downloade-book, from various sources.
- One of the 50 women identified by the publication Computer weekly, "Most Influential Women in UK IT 2016"
- Most Influential Women in UK Tech Hall of Fame 2020
