= Adele Jackson =

Australian Paralympic lawn bowler

Personal information
- Nationality: Australia
Medal record
Lawn Bowls
Paralympic Games
Gold medal – first place	1976 Toronto	Women's Pairs B

Adele Jackson is an Australian Paralympic lawn bowler. At the 1976 Toronto Games, she competed in two events and won a gold medal in the Women's Pairs B with Charmaine Smith.
