= Peter Hill (Paralympian) =

Australian Paralympic swimmer and athlete

Personal information
- Nationality: Australia
- Born: 1957 (age 68–69)

Sport
- Sport: Swimming
- Strokes: Backstroke, Breaststroke
Medal record
Men's Paralympic swimming
Representing Australia
Paralympic Games
| Silver medal – second place | 1980 Arnhem | 25 m backstroke 1C |
| Silver medal – second place | 1980 Arnhem | 25 m breaststroke 1C |

Peter Hill (born 1957) is an Australian Paralympic swimmer and athlete, who won two silver medals at the 1980 Arnhem Paralympics.

== Personal ==
Hill was born in Brisbane. At the age of 18, a car accident left him a quadriplegic. Before the accident, he was an apprentice plumber and was a sports champion at school. Five years after the accident, he qualified as a dental technician. He also designed and built wheelchairs.

== Sporting career ==
At the 1979 National Paraplegic and Quadriplegic Games in Perth Hill won gold medals in athletics events. At the 1980 Arnhem Games, he competed in athletics and swimming events. He won silver medals in the Men's 25 m Backstroke 1C and Men's 25 m Breaststroke 1C events.

In 1980, at the age of 23, he was named Young Australian of the Year.
