= Barry Kalms =

Australian Paralympic weightlifter and athlete

Personal information
- Nationality: Australia
Medal record
Weightlifting
Paralympic Games
| Bronze medal – third place | 1980 Arnhem | Men's Weightlifting - Lightweight 65kg amputee |

Barry Kalms is an Australian Paralympic weightlifter and athlete. At the 1980 Summer Paralympics he won a bronze medal in the Men's Weightlifting Lightweight 65 kg amputee division and competed in various athletics events (specifically high jump, long jump and the 100 m).
