= Chris Alp =

Australian Paralympic athlete

Personal information
- Full name: Christopher Alp
- Nationality: Australian
Medal record
Men's para-athletics
Representing Australia
Paralympic Games
Bronze medal – third place	1980 Arnhem	100 m 3
Bronze medal – third place	1980 Arnhem	200 m 3

Christopher Alp is an Australian former Paralympic athlete.

He became a wheelchair user after surviving a plane crash at the age of 12. At the 1980 Arnhem Games, he competed in four athletics events and won bronze medals in the Men's 100 m 3 and Men's 200 m 3 events. He has been involved in basketball, skiing, cycling and motorsport. In 1985, he competed in the International Wheelchair Basketball Games in England. He has competed in the Targa Tasmania

He is a chartered accountant and has Bachelor of Arts and Bachelor of Commerce degrees from the University of Melbourne. He is a Director of AlpMcNamara, a Melbourne-based company specialising in wealth protection for privately owned businesses.

His philosophy on life is "I didn’t want to be a blob on society; I wanted to be someone who would be able to help and be useful and really contribute."
