= Gloria Pascoe =

Australian Paralympic athlete

Personal information
- Nationality: Australia
- Born: Una Gloria Cowland Smith; 19 February 1919 North Fitzroy, Victoria, Australia
- Died: 19 March 2004 (aged 85) Melbourne, Victoria, Australia
- Spouse: Alf Francis Pascoe (m. 1941)
Medal record
Lawn bowls
Paralympic Games
Gold medal – first place	1980 Arnhem	Women's Singles B

Gloria Una Pascoe (née Smith, 19 February 1919 – 19 March 2004) was an Australian Paralympic vision-impaired lawn bowler. She also had epilepsy.

== Biography ==
Gloria Smith was born at the Salvation Army Hospital, North Fitzroy in February 1919. Her parents were John and Cecil Gertrude (née Cowland) Smith. She was the youngest of six children - Jack, Oriel (known as Judy), Elsie, Roma and Vincent. She grew up in the Greensborough area and went to Greensborough School.

At the age of nine whilst playing basketball in the school playground she lost consciousness. She was diagnosed as having epilepsy. As her life progressed, her eyesight was deteriorating. At the age of 55, she became totally blind. She received assistance from the Association for the Blind in Kooyong on how to live without sight. The Association formed a Blind Bowling Club and held its first Blind Bowls Championship at the St Kilda Bowling Club. She played bowls for four years before becoming totally blind. She was able to play pennant bowls with sighted bowlers.

At the age of 14, she left school and attended Stott's Business College to train as a typist. In 1941, she married Alf Pascoe who was in the Air Force.

She was selected to participate in the 1980 Summer Paralympics in Arnhem and she won a gold medal in the Women's Singles B. In 1981, she came first in the Victorian State Titles held at Footscray and as a result she was chosen to represent Australia at the Second World Blind Bowls Championships in England. At the Championships she won a silver medal. At the 1983 FESPIC Games, she won two gold medals.

In 1983, she won the Progress Press Sports Star of the Year. In 1987, the Association for the Blind bestowed on her Life Membership for services to the Association.

Her husband, Alf Pascoe, died in 1988. They had a daughter, Jennifer, and a son, Bruce Pascoe, a writer. A book was published on her life - Gloria : light in the dark by Gloria Pascoe and Bruce Pascoe.
