= Robert Farmer (Paralympian) =

Australian Paralympic lawn bowler

Personal information
- Nationality: Australia
Medal record
Lawn bowls
Paralympic Games
Gold medal – first place	1976 Toronto	Men's Singles A

Robert Farmer is an Australian Paralympic lawn bowler. At the 1976 Toronto Games, he won a gold medal in the Men's Singles A.
