= Gail Nicholson =

Australian Paralympic swimmer

Personal information
- Nationality: Australia
Medal record
Swimming
Paralympic Games
Gold medal – first place	1976 Toronto	Women's 100 m Backstroke C
Gold medal – first place	1976 Toronto	Women's 100 m Freestyle C

Gail Nicholson is an Australian Paralympic swimmer. She won two gold medals at the 1976 Toronto Games in the Women's 100 m Backstroke C and Women's 100 m Freestyle C events.
