= John Hind (swimmer) =

Australian Paralympic swimmer

Personal information
- Nationality: Australia
Medal record
Swimming
Paralympic Games
| Silver medal – second place | 1976 Toronto | Men's 25 m Freestyle 2 |
| Silver medal – second place | 1976 Toronto | Men's 25 m Butterfly 2 |
| Silver medal – second place | 1976 Toronto | Men's 3 x 25 m Individual Medley 2 |

John Hind is an Australian Paralympic swimmer. At the 1976 Toronto Games, he competed in five swimming events and won three silver medals in the Men's 25 m Freestyle 2, Men's 25 m Butterfly 2 and Men's 3 x 25 m Individual Medley 2.
