= Wayne Lanham =

Australian Paralympic athlete

Personal information
- Nationality: Australia
Medal record
Athletics
Paralympic Games
Gold medal – first place	1980 Arnhem	Men's 100 m F
Silver medal – second place	1980 Arnhem	Men's 400 m F

Wayne Lanham competed in the 1980 Arnhem Paralympics for Australia. He was part of the athletics team and competed in several events, including: Men's Javelin F, Men's Long Jump F, Men's Shot Put F, Men's 100m F, Men's 400m F. His efforts resulted in a gold medal in the Men's 100m F and a silver medal in the Men's 400m F.

He set a world record both in the first round and then beat this in the final round finishing with a time of 11.93 beating the next competitor by 0.12.
