= Jago Mikulic =

Australian Paralympic athlete

Jago Mikulic (Jako Zeljko Mikulic)
Personal information
- Nationality: Australia
Medal record
Athletics
Paralympic Games
Silver medal – second place	1976 Toronto	Men's Javelin A
Bronze medal – third place	1976 Toronto	Men's Pentathlon A

Jago Mikulic (full name Jako Zeljko Mikulic) is a Paralympic athletics competitor from Australia who competed in the 1976 Summer Paralympics as a classified "A" athlete in the Men's 60 m, Long Jump, Shot Put, Pentathlon and Javelin. He won two medals: a silver medal in the Men's Javelin A event and a bronze in the Men's Pentathlon A event.
