= Fred Pointer =

Australian Paralympic athlete

Frederick Pointer
Personal information
- Nickname: Fred
- Nationality: Australia
- Born: 19 July 1945 Melbourne
- Died: 28 October 2024 (aged 79)
Medal record
Athletics
Paralympic Games
Bronze medal – third place	1980 Arnhem	Men's 400 m 3
Bronze medal – third place	1980 Arnhem	Men's Slalom 3

Frederick "Fred" Pointer (19 July 1945 - 28 October 2024) was an Australian Paralympic athlete and wheelchair basketball player. At the 1980 Arnhem Games, he competed in four athletics events and won two bronze medals in the Men's 400 m 3 and Men's Slalom 3 events. He was also part of the Australia men's national wheelchair basketball team at the 1980 games.

In June 1979, he pushed his wheelchair from Melbourne to Sydney. He took 74 hours for the 907-kilometre journey. Pointer attempted to raise $100,000 to assist the Australian team at the 1980 Summer Paralympics in Arnhem, Netherlands. It was reported that he only raised about $2,500.
