= Eric Russell (athlete) =

Australian Paralympic athlete, coach and administrator

Personal information
- Full name: Eric Cyril Russell
- Nationality: Australian
- Born: 7 January 1944 (age 82) Maryborough, Queensland
Medal record
Athletics
Paralympic Games
Gold medal – first place	1976 Toronto	Men's Discus 3
Gold medal – first place	1976 Toronto	Men's Pentathlon 3
Gold medal – first place	1976 Toronto	Men's Shot Put 3
Gold medal – first place	1980 Arnhem	Men's Shot Put 3
Silver medal – second place	1976 Toronto	Men's Javelin 3
Bronze medal – third place	1980 Arnhem	Men's Discus 3
Bronze medal – third place	1980 Arnhem	Men's Pentathlon 3

Eric Cyril Russell, MBE (born 7 January 1944) is an Australian Paralympic athlete, coach, and administrator.

== Personal ==
Russell was born on 7 January 1944 in the Queensland city of Maryborough. After leaving school, he served an apprenticeship as a boilermaker. He played professional rugby league in Port Moresby, Papua New Guinea, and while there, he sustained a spinal cord injury in a car crash. Russell spent 16 days in hospital in Papua New Guinea. He was then flown to Brisbane, where he underwent rehabilitation for three months, and was inspired to take up sport by athletes training at the spinal injury unit. He has been married to Paralympic athlete and powerlifter Julie Russell since 1979. The pair met in 1977 for the first time when Eric came to Adelaide for the first National Basketball Titles. Eric and Julie were then introduced officially in 1978 at the Regional Games in Broken Hill.

He has been a member of Rotary International since 1985, first joining the Rotary Club of Adelaide, South Australia, and then moving to Adelaide Parks, where he later served as president in 1989. He was the 2011–12 District Governor of District 9500, which covers parts of the Northern Territory (including Alice Springs) and South Australia (including Adelaide).

== Competitive career ==
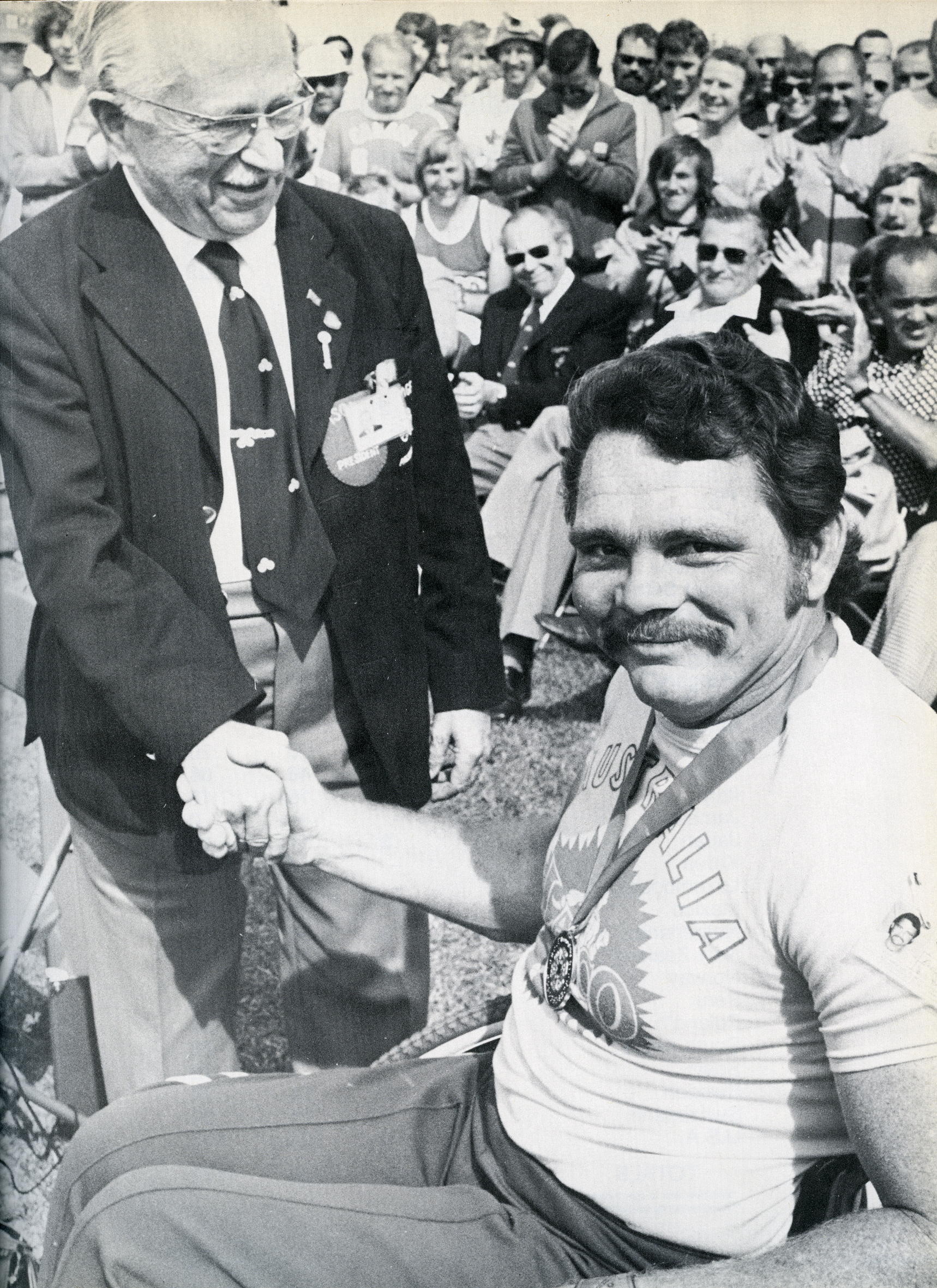
Eric Russell with Ludwig Guttman at the 1976 Paralympic Toronto Paralympics

Russell's career began in 1972 when he participated in a shot put trial for the National Games that were to be competed in Sydney later that year. He was selected for the Games where he finished with two bronze and one silver medal. He represented Australia at the 1974 Commonwealth Paraplegic Games in Dunedin, New Zealand.

At the 1976 Toronto Games, he won three gold medals in the Men's Discus 3, Men's Pentathlon 3 and Men's Shot Put 3 events and a silver medal in the Men's Javelin 3 event; he was also part of the Australia men's national wheelchair basketball team at the games. Despite setting a world record in the discus, he rejected the gold medal for that event because of politics being injected into the Games; several national teams had boycotted the competition due to the presence of the South African Paralympic team during the apartheid era, at a time when many sports teams from that country were banned from international competition. Russell said: "We have enough of a common bond in our disabilities without governments bringing politics into it". Following his protest, Russell was ordered to attend a meeting with Kevin Betts and Ludwig Guttmann where he left the meeting in frustration as a result of his issue with the politics associated with the Games. A press conference was then held the next morning where Russell was awarded a medal for the excellence of his protest which he later returned to the lawn bowler from whom it was taken.

At the 1980 Arnhem Games, he won a gold medal in the Men's Shot Put 3 event and two bronze medals in the Men's Discus 3 and Men's Pentathlon 3 events. At the 1992 Barcelona Games, he came seventh in the Men's Javelin THW6 event. Going into the 1992 Games, he had won 26 gold medals at 16 events.

== Sport administration ==
Russell has served in several positions in disabled athletics including as a coach, sport administrator, and sport event director. He was the Chairman of Athletics at the International Stoke Mandeville Games Federation from 1978 to 1988. After realising that he had achieved all of his initial goals, Russell resigned from his position as Chairman of Athletics in 1988. He also served as an international Paralympic classifier in athletics. Russell was the inaugural Representative for the South-Pacific Region on the International Paralympic Committee. He resigned from this role in 1993 because of the politics within the sport.

== Recognition ==
Russell became a Member of the Order of the British Empire in the 1981 Birthday Honours for service to "the handicapped in the field of sport". In that year, he received an Advance Australia Award. In 2007, he was made a life member of the Wheelchair Sports Association of South Australia. The Eric Russell Male Athlete of the Meet Award, issued by the Sporting Wheelies and Disabled Association, is named in Russell's honour; he was the first coordinator and later a state administrator of the organisation.
