= Roy Fowler (Paralympian) =

Australian Paralympic competitor

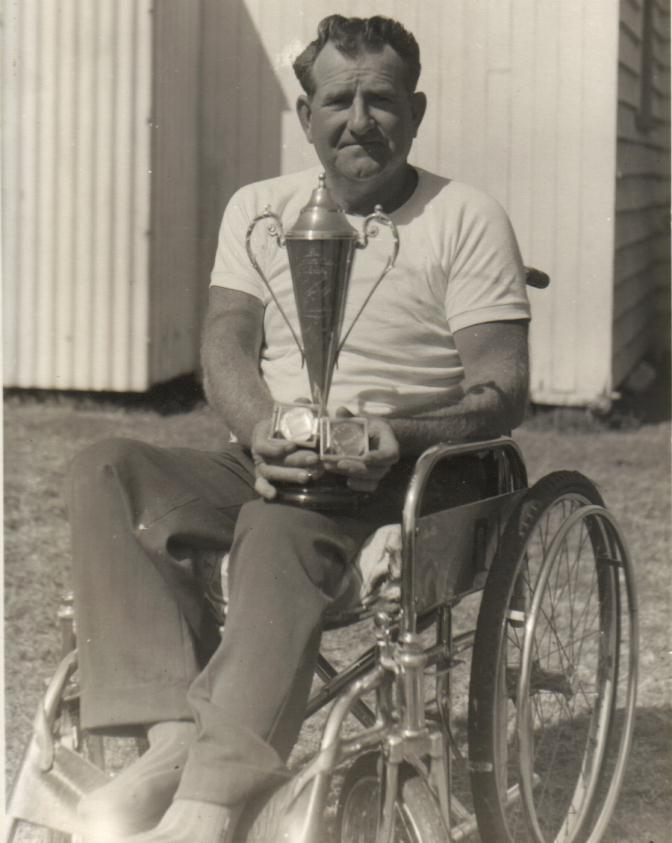
- Fowler holding some of his medals and trophies

Personal information
- Nickname: Chook
- Nationality: Australia
- Born: 22 March 1920 Brisbane, Queensland, Australia
- Died: 19 September 2002 (aged 82)
Medal record
Representing Australia
Paralympic Games
Men's para archery
Silver medal – second place	1964 Tokyo	St. Nicholas Round open
Silver medal – second place	1964 Tokyo	St. Nicholas Round Team open
Silver medal – second place	1972 Heidelberg	FITA Round open
Bronze medal – third place	1972 Heidelberg	FITA Round Team open
Men's lawn bowls
Gold medal – first place	1984 New York / Stoke Mandeville	Pairs paraplegic
Gold medal – first place	1984 New York / Stoke Mandeville	Singles paraplegic
Gold medal – first place	1988 Seoul	Pairs 2–6
Men's para swimming
Gold medal – first place	1964 Tokyo	25 m Breaststroke complete class 1
Gold medal – first place	1964 Tokyo	25 m Freestyle Prone complete class 1
Gold medal – first place	1964 Tokyo	25 m Freestyle Supine complete class 1

Roy Fowler (22 March 1920 – 19 September 2002) was an Australian Paralympic competitor, who won ten medals at six Paralympics from 1964 to 1988.

== Personal ==
Fowler was born in Brisbane. He played rugby league and competed in swimming for his school until he was twelve, when he went to the outback to work at a drover's camp during the Great Depression. At the age of fourteen, he had his first professional fight. During World War II, he was a gunner in the 2/2 Tank Attack Regiment of the Australian Army, and after the war, he toured Australia as part of a tag team professional wrestling circuit.

In 1963 he had a cerebral haemorrhage after a coalmining accident, and became a quadriplegic. He spent six months in the spinal unit of the Princess Alexandra Hospital and then went to the Kingshome Rehabilitation Centre, where he was introduced to wheelchair sport. He died on 19 September 2002 at the age of 82. He was survived by his wife, Mary, and at the time of his death he was living in East Ipswich. He was nicknamed "Chook".

Fowler was also an accomplished artist, painting during his spare time. He was also well known in Brisbane's horse racing community, becoming a part-owner of racehorses during his regular Saturday visits to racetracks when his sporting commitments allowed.

== Competitive career ==
Fowler's first international competition was the 1964 Tokyo Games, where he won three gold medals in swimming in the Men's 25 m Breaststroke complete class 1, Men's 25 m Freestyle Prone complete class 1, and Men's 25 m Freestyle Supine complete class 1 events, and two silver medals in archery in the Men's St. Nicholas Round open and Men's St. Nicholas Round Team open events. In archery, he also won a silver medal in the Men's FITA Round open event and a bronze medal in the Men's FITA Round Team open event at the 1972 Heidelberg Games, and participated but did not win any medals in both archery and dartchery at the 1968 Tel Aviv and 1976 Toronto games. His favourite sport was archery, and he reached the top 20 in the world in non-disabled archery competition. In 1981 he took up lawn bowls, and reached the semi-finals in the sport at the 1983 Stoke Mandeville Games. He won two gold medals in the sport at the 1984 New York/Stoke Mandeville Games in both the Men's Pairs and Singles paraplegic events, the former event with Eric Magennis, and another gold medal at the 1988 Seoul Games in the Men's Pairs 2–6 event with Stan Kosmala. The first Paralympic gold medallist in lawn bowls from Queensland, he was undefeated in national disabled competitions from 1982 to 1991, winning nine national singles titles, and excelled in non-disabled lawn bowls competitions. After a health setback in 1998 that saw him in hospital for a year, he won a gold medal in a national competition months after his release. He won 100 medals in national and international wheelchair sport.

== Recognition ==
In 2000 at the age of 80, Fowler participated in the Paralympic torch relay. That year, he received an Australian Sports Medal.
