= Charmaine Smith (bowls) =

Australian Paralympic lawn bowler

Personal information
- Nationality: Australia
Medal record
Lawn Bowls
Paralympic Games
Gold medal – first place	1976 Toronto	Women's Pairs B
Silver medal – second place	1976 Toronto	Women's Singles B

Charmaine Smith is an Australian Paralympic lawn bowler. At the 1976 Toronto Games, she won a gold medal with Adele Jackson in the Women's Pairs B and a silver medal in the Women's Singles B.
