= South Africa at the 1976 Summer Paralympics =

- IPC code: RSA
- NPC: South African Sports Confederation and Olympic Committee
- Website: www.sascoc.co.za

in Toronto
- Competitors: 39 in 7 sports
- Medals Ranked 19th: Gold 6 Silver 9 Bronze 11 Total 26

Summer Paralympics appearances (overview)
- 1964; 1968; 1972; 1976; 1980–1988; 1992; 1996; 2000; 2004; 2008; 2012; 2016; 2020; 2024

South Africa took part in the 1976 Summer Paralympics in Toronto, Ontario, Canada. The country was represented by 39 athletes, twenty-nine male and ten female. South Africans competed in archery, athletics, dartchery, lawn bowls, swimming, table tennis and wheelchair basketball. They won twenty six medals in total: six golds, nine silvers and eleven bronze, finishing 19th on the medal table.

These were South Africa's last Paralympics for sixteen years due to South Africa's policy of apartheid. The Netherlands, as hosts of the 1980 Games and ironically its former colonial master, declared South Africa's further participation "undesirable". South Africa was subsequently absent from the Paralympic Games until 1992.
