= Wayne Patchett =

Australian Paralympic athlete

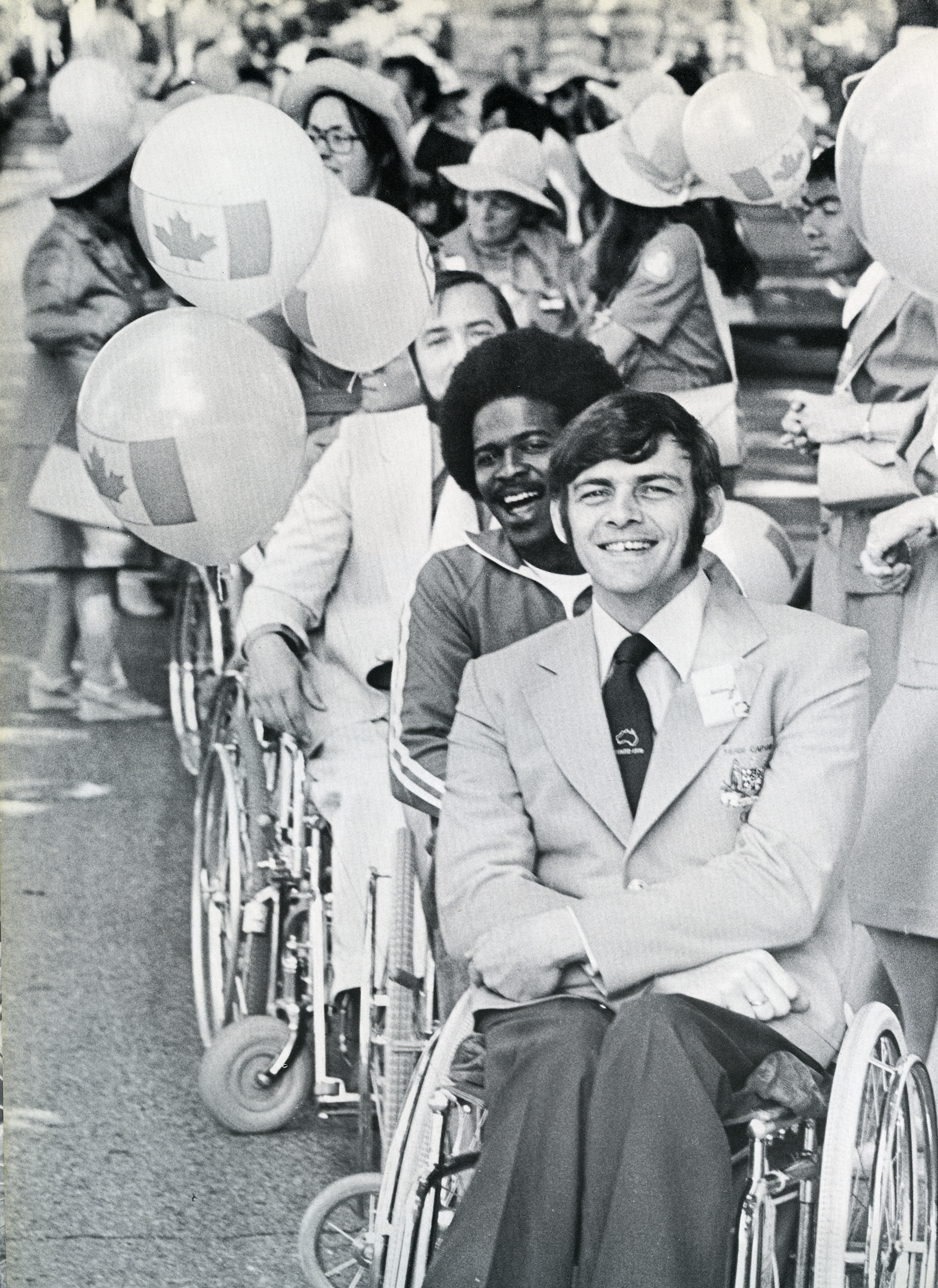
- Wayne Patchett at the 1976 Summer Paralympics

Personal information
- Full name: Wayne John Patchett
- Nationality: Australia
Medal record
Athletics
Paralympic Games
Gold medal – first place	1976 Toronto	Men's Discus 1A
Gold medal – first place	1980 Arnhem	Men's Club Throw 1A
Gold medal – first place	1980 Arnhem	Men's Discus 1A
Gold medal – first place	1980 Arnhem	Men's Shot Put 1A
Silver medal – second place	1976 Toronto	Men's Shot Put 1A

Wayne John Patchett is an Australian Paralympic athlete. At the 1976 Toronto Games, he won a gold medal in the Men's Discus 1A event and a silver medal in the Men's Shot Put 1A event. At the 1980 Arnhem Games, he won three gold medals in the Men's Club Throw 1A, Men's Discus 1A, and Men's Shot Put 1A events. In 2000, he received an Australian Sports Medal.
