= Sporting Wheelies and Disabled Association =

Disabilities sporting association based in Queensland, Australia

The Sporting Wheelies and Disabled Association was the peak body for sport, recreation and fitness for people with a physical disability or vision impairment in the Australian state of Queensland.

In January 2024, all the staff, assets and liabilities of the association were to be transitioned to Spinal Life Australia, with the words 'Sporting Wheelies' only retained as a business name.

The not-for-profit organisation's mission was 'to enhance the lives of people with a disability through community engagement and education, sport and healthy activity', and was changed after 2019 to 'Engage, empower and develop people with a disability to live a more healthy, active and fulfilled life of their choosing'. It supported people with a range of disabilities including acquired brain injury, amputations, cerebral palsy, multiple sclerosis, muscular dystrophy, spina bifida, spinal cord injury, other neuromuscular and orthopaedic conditions, and vision impairment (partial or total vision loss). The organisation's sports programs and services encouraged participation from social level through to elite competition such as the Paralympic Games.

The organisation's headquarters was in Brisbane, about September 2020, moving from 60 Edmondstone Road, Bowen Hills, to 30 Dover Street, Albion. There were offices in Cairns, Townsville, Mackay and Central Queensland. The now Brisbane-only business moved on 5 September 2023 to 2 Kilroe Street, Milton.

== Former governance ==
Under the association's constitution, the general control and management of the administration of Sporting Wheelies and Disabled Association was by a board of six. An advisory council of Queensland business and community leaders met on a regular basis to advise and assist the Board in the development and implementation of association policies.

Five-time Paralympian and coach Ray Epstein was the chief executive officer of the association from 1998 to December 2016.

== History ==
The association has its origins in the 1960s as a small sports club within the Paraplegic Welfare Association in Queensland. Sport for people with spinal cord injuries was gaining popularity following the first Paralympic Games in Rome in 1960, and the 'Queensland Sports and Social Club for the Disabled' played an active role in promoting disability sport and raising funds for Queensland athletes selected for national and international competitions.

In 1977, the club became a registered charity in its own right as the Paraplegic and Quadriplegic Sport Association of Queensland. By the following year, the association had extended its programs and services to include people with physical disabilities other than spinal cord injuries. The decision was made to change to the new name to reflect the association's broader mission and capitalise on the popular term 'sporting wheelies' to describe wheelchair athletes.

The association worked with national bodies such as the Sport Australia and the Paralympics Australia.

In January 2024, Spinal Life Australia absorbed the association, Spinal Life Association starting out as that 1960s Paraplegic Welfare Association.

== Notable Paralympians ==
- Ashley Adams
- Rene Ahrens
- Greg Ball
- Brendan Burkett
- Lyn Coleman
- Cameron de Burgh
- Stephen Eaton
- Amanda Fraser
- Darren Gardiner
- Marayke Jonkers
- Adrian King
- Warren Lawton
- Karni Liddell
- Alison Mosely
- Mike Nugent
- Christopher Scott
- Brooke Stockham
- Darren Thrupp
- Geoff Trappett
- Rachael Watson

Association members inducted into the Queensland Wheelchair Basketball Hall of Fame have included Robert McIntyre (1996), Rene Ahrens (1996), Beryl Ahrens (1996), Kevin Bishop (1996), Fred Nitz (1996), Mike Nugent (1996), Mathew Le Busque (2001), and Adrian King (2003).

== Services ==
Member services previously included financial support to participate in representative sporting events and training camps; junior development squads for young athletes; social sporting competitions; subsidised recreational activities; and fitness and rehabilitation services through its Brisbane gym. The business then embraced the Australian Government's National Disability Insurance Scheme. The organisation worked with partners in disability services, the public sector and sporting bodies to promote inclusion and increase participation of people with a disability in sport and active recreation.

== See also ==
- Australia at the Paralympics
- Disabled sports
