= Peter Marsh (athlete) =

Personal information
- Full name: Peter James Marsh
- Nationality: Australian
- Born: 19 October 1948
- Died: 26 November 2012 (aged 64) Brisbane, Australia
Medal record
Men's para-athletics
Representing Australia
Paralympic Games
Bronze medal – third place	1976 Toronto	60 m 1A
Bronze medal – third place	1976 Toronto	Precision club throw 1A–1B

Peter James Marsh (19 October 1948 – 26 November 2012) was an Australian Paralympic athlete and table tennis player who competed at three Paralympic Games and won two bronze medals.

== Personal ==
In June 1970, at the age of 21, Marsh sustained a spinal injury playing rugby league for Wests Panthers at Lang Park. He became a quadriplegic complete below C5–C6. Before the injury he had participated in surf lifesaving, and he was working as a motor mechanic at the time.

In 1976, the Paraplegic Welfare Association (now Spinal Injuries Association) employed him, their first employee with a disability, as a welfare officer. He continued to work full-time for the organisation until 1983. He was also involved as an administrator with wheelchair sports organisations and is a life member of Sporting Wheelies and Disabled Association. In 2008, he worked as a volunteer with the Marist College Ashgrove community service program.

Marsh died on 26 November 2012. He is survived by his wife Anne and their son Kieran.

== Career ==
At the 1976 Toronto Games, Marsh competed in athletics and table tennis and won two bronze medals in the Men's 60 m 1A and Men's Precision Club Throw 1A–1B events. He competed in athletics and table tennis at the 1980 Arnhem Games but did not win a medal. At the 1984 New York/Stoke Mandeville Games, he competed in three athletics events but did not win a medal.
