= Doug Rupe =

Australian Paralympic athlete

Personal information
- Nationality: Australia
Medal record
Athletics
Paralympic Games
Silver medal – second place	1976 Toronto	Men's High Jump A

Doug Rupe is an Australian Paralympic athletics silver medalist.

He competed at the 1976 Toronto Games in three athletics events. He won a silver medal in the Men's High Jump A.
