= Bruce Thwaite =

Australian paralympic competitor (1923 - 1991)

Personal information
- Full name: Bruce Oliver Thwaite
- Nationality: Australia
- Born: 2 December 1923
- Died: 21 September 1991 (aged 67)
Medal record
Lawn bowls
Representing Australia
Paralympic Games
Gold medal – first place	1976 Toronto	Men's Pairs wh

Bruce Oliver Thwaite (2 December 1923 – 21 September 1991) was an Australian Paralympic competitor. During World War II, he sustained a spinal injury when he landed on a tree after parachuting from a bomber plane over Germany. He was treated at the Stoke Mandeville Hospital.

He first represented Australia at the 1957 International Stoke Mandeville Games in archery. At the 1962 Commonwealth Paraplegic Games in Perth, he won gold medals in the Men's Swimming 50 m Crawl Class B and Men's Swimming 50 m Breaststroke Class B events, a silver medal in the Weightlifting Class B Middleweight event and a bronze medal in the Men's Precision Archery event. He competed at the 1964 Tokyo Paralympics in swimming and weightlifting. He then took up lawn bowls. At the 1974 Commonwealth Paraplegic Games in Dunedin, he won a gold medal in the Men's Singles event and a silver medal in the Men's Pairs event. At the 1976 Toronto Games, he teamed with Eric Magennis to win the gold medal in the Men's Pairs wh event. The first New South Wales Paraplegic Sports Club meeting was held in his jewellery shop in the Sydney suburb of Concord.
