= Stan Kosmala =

Australian Paralympic competitor

Personal information
- Nationality: Australia
- Born: 19 February 1950 (age 76) Germany
Medal record
Lawn bowls
Paralympic Games
Gold medal – first place	1988 Seoul	Men's Pairs 2–6

Stan Kosmala (born 19 February 1950) is an Australian Paralympic competitor, who has competed in athletics, wheelchair basketball, lawn bowls and shooting. Born in Germany, he contracted polio at the age of two. He is married to Paralympic shooter Libby Kosmala, whom he met through wheelchair sport, and has two sons and two grandchildren.

He participated in the 1976 Toronto Games in athletics events, and also as a member of the Australia men's national wheelchair basketball team. He won a gold medal at the 1988 Seoul Games in lawn bowls in the Men's Pairs 2–6 event with Roy Fowler. At the 2000 Sydney Games, he came ninth just behind his wife in the preliminary round of the Mixed Air Rifle Prone SH1- event, and did not make the final.
