= John Kidd (Paralympian) =

Personal information
- Nationality: Australian
- Born: 4 November 1947 Maitland, New South Wales
- Died: 26 February 2016 (aged 68) Toowoomba, Queensland
Medal record
Men's para athletics
Representing Australia
Paralympic Games
Silver medal – second place	1976 Toronto	Javelin 4

John Francis Kidd (4 November 1947 – 26 February 2016) was an Australian Paralympic athletics and wheelchair basketball competitor.

He was born on 4 November 1947 in Maitland, New South Wales. He was a Corporal in the Australian Army from 22 April 1967 to 21 March 1968 and served in the Vietnam War. He was a probationary constable in the New South Wales Police Force from 1969 to 1982. He became a paraplegic when a truck knocked him off his police motorbike on Concord Road in Sydney in May 1969. Commissioner Norman Allan visited Kidd whilst he was in Prince Henry Hospital and told him he could remain in the police force as long as he wanted to. Kidd worked at several Sydney police stations before transferring to the Lismore Police Station's intelligence area where he assisted in major incidents such as the Murwillumbah bank robbery, the double beach murders at Kingscliff, a couple of other serious murders involving the Mr Asia syndicate. He retired from the police force in 1982 due to ill health. In March 1995, he was awarded the National Medal. He died in Toowoomba, Queensland on 26 February 2016.

At the 1976 Summer Games, he competed in three athletics events and won a silver medal in the Men's Javelin 4 and finished tenth in the Men's Shot Put 4 and fifteenth in the Men's Discus 4. He was also a member of the Australian wheelchair basketball team at the 1976 Toronto Games. Kidd broke Australian Javelin records from 1973 to 1977. He retired from competitive sport when he moved to Lismore, New South Wales.

In an interview in 1980, Kidd said "Before recovering from the accident my favorite sport was drinking beer. Because of the accident I discovered sport and it took me on several trips around the world... I can't complain".
