= Murray Todd =

Australian Paralympic athlete

Personal information
- Nationality: Australia
Medal record
Athletics
Paralympic Games
Silver medal – second place	1976 Toronto	Men's Shot Put 2
Gold medal – first place	1980 Arnhem	Men's Shot Put 2

Murray Todd is an Australian Paralympic athletics competitor.

He was from South Australia. At the 1976 Toronto Games, he competed in three athletics throwing events and won a silver medal in the Men's Shot Put 2. At the 1980 Arnhem Games, he competed in two athletics throwing events and won the gold medal in the Men's Shot Put 2.
