= Bruce Sandilands =

Australian Paralympic athlete

Personal information
- Nationality: Australia
Medal record
Athletics
Paralympic Games
Bronze medal – third place	1980 Arnhem	Men's 1500 m B

Bruce Sandilands is an Australian visually impaired Paralympic athlete who competed in the 1980 Arnhem Paralympics as a classified "B" athlete in the Men's 400 m and 1500 m. He won a bronze medal in the 1500 m B event. He was also a member of the goalball team. He was from Victoria. He has played blind cricket in Victoria.
