= Paul Gianni =

Australian Paralympic athlete

Personal information
- Nationality: Australia
Medal record
Athletics
Paralympic Games
Bronze medal – third place	1976 Toronto	Men's 100 m B

Paul Gianni is an Australian Paralympic athlete. He was a B-classified competitor at the 1976 Summer Paralympics representing Australia in high jump, long jump, javelin, shot put and the 100 m. In the 100 m he won a bronze medal.
