= Paul Bird (Paralympian) =

Australian Paralympic swimmer

Paul Bird OAM
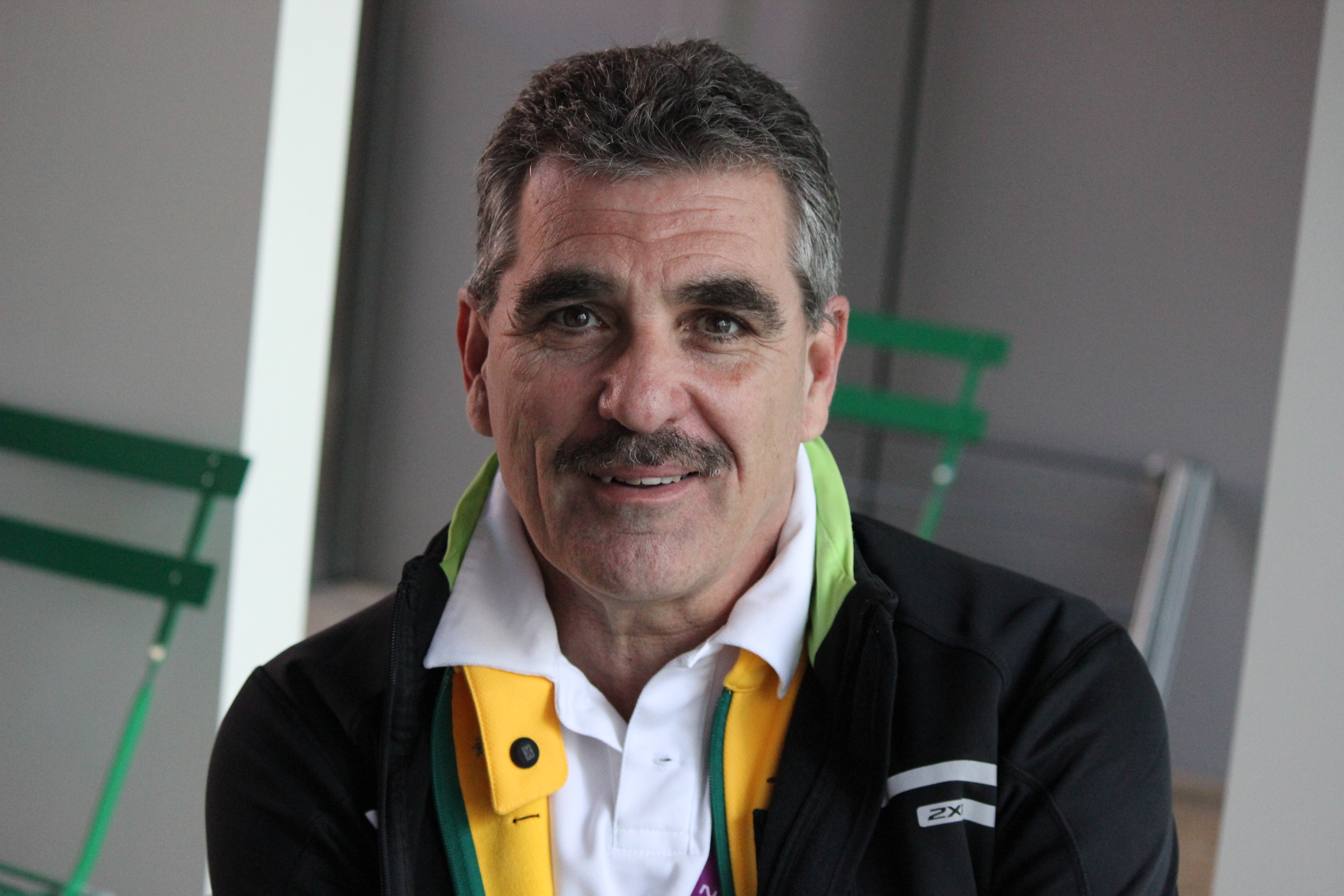

Personal information
- Full name: Paul Bird
- Nicknames: "Feathers" "Paulie"
- Nationality: Australia
- Born: 18 July 1954 (age 72) Murwillumbah, New South Wales
Medal record
Gold medal – first place	1980 Arnhem	Men's 4x100m freestyle Relay
Gold medal – first place	1984 New York	Men's 4x100m freestyle Relay
Silver medal – second place	1984 New York	Men's 100m backstroke

Paul Bird is an Australian athlete, swimmer, Paralympic gold and silver medalist, and sports administrator.

== Personal ==
Paul Bird was born in Murwillumbah, New South Wales on 18 July 1954, one of five sons of Ken and Thelma Bird. He was educated at St John Fishers, Ignatius Park College and Home Hill State High School. He participated in a number of sports, playing rugby league for North Queensland Schoolboys, and was a state medalist in backstroke relay as a 17-year-old. His leg was amputated as a result of a motor cycle accident when he was 18, but he continued sporting activities, including swimming. He was also an assistant scuba diving instructor for a Townsville club.

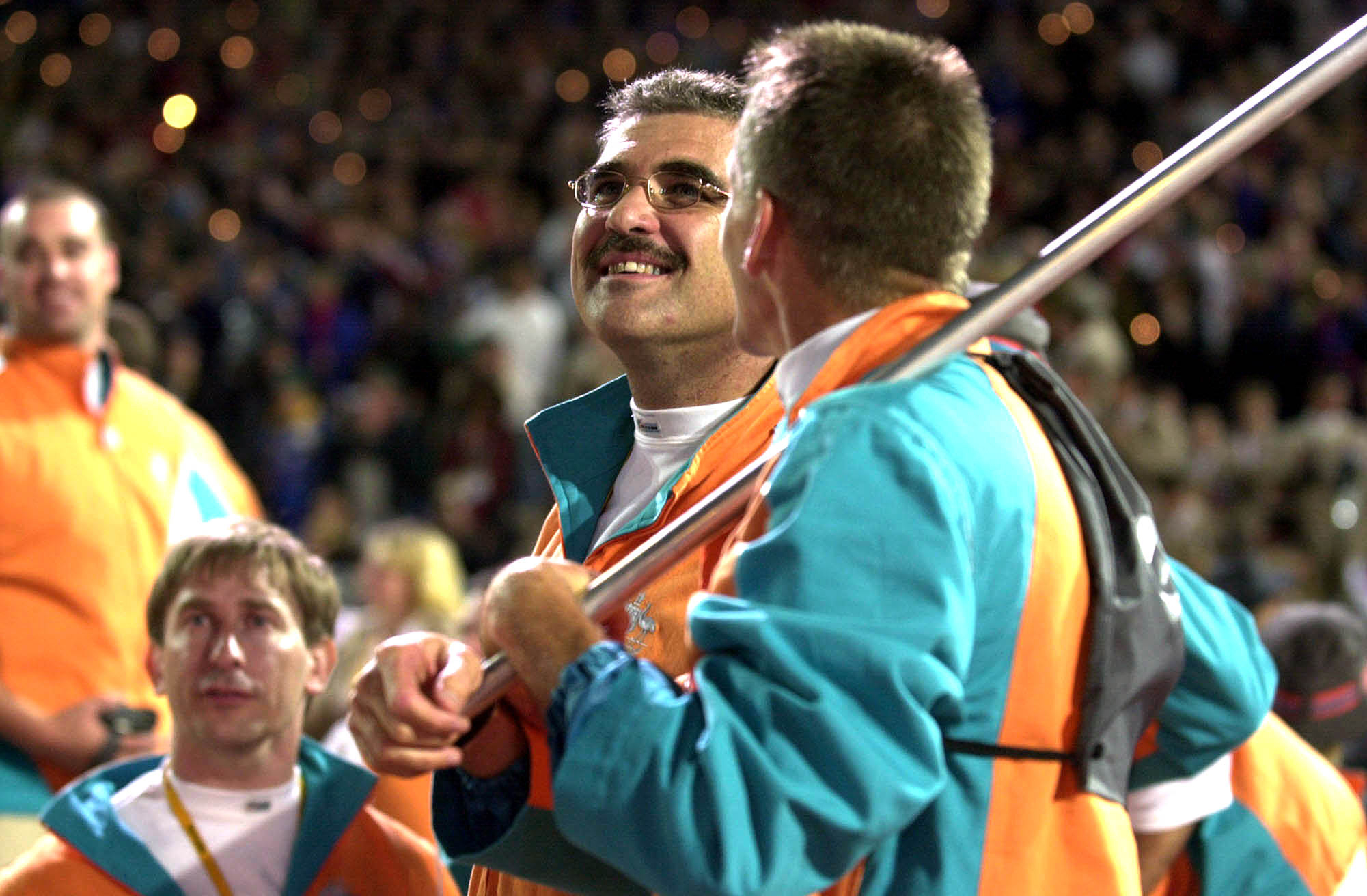
2000 Sydney Opening Ceremony

== Career ==
He won a number of events in the pool and on the field as well, earning him a place in the Queensland state squad. In Sydney he won the Australian long jump and pentathlon events, and was runner up in discus, shot-put, javelin, butterfly, backstroke and freestyle championships. He was a member of the team for the 1980 Summer Paralympics in Arnhem, Netherlands, winning a gold medal in the pool in the 4 × 100 metre freestyle relay. He was the Australian Team Captain at the 1984 Summer Paralympics, at which he won a second gold medal in the 4 × 100 metre freestyle relay, and a silver medal in the 100m backstroke.

He was appointed to the Australian Paralympic Team staff as a Section Manager for the 1988 Summer Paralympics in Seoul in 1988. He was Assistant Chef de Mission for Australian Paralympic team at the 1992 Summer Paralympics in Barcelona, the 1996 Summer Paralympics in Atlanta and the 2008 Summer Paralympics in Beijing, and was Chef de Mission for the 2000 Summer Paralympics in Sydney and the 2004 Summer Paralympics in Athens. He was also the Chef de Mission for the Australian team at the 1999 FESPIC Games in Bangkok and the 2002 FESPIC Games in Pusan, and was Assistant Chef de Mission for the 2006 FESPIC Games in Kuala Lumpur. He was one of the torchbearers at the 2000 Summer Olympics torch relay. He was elected President of the Oceania Paralympic Committee in December 2005.

In November 2000 he was awarded the Australian Sports Medal for "over 20 years outstanding service to the Paralympic movement and as Chef de Mission". He was awarded the Order of Australia Medal in 2002 "For service to sports administration, particularly through the Australian Paralympic Committee." In 2010, he was awarded the Paralympic Medal, the APC's highest award, for his leadership roles with Australian Teams and his contribution to the development of the Australian Paralympic Committee over a period of 30 years. In December 2021, he was awarded the International Paralympic Committee's Paralympic Order.
