= Rene Ahrens =

Australian Paralympic athlete and wheelchair basketballer

Personal information
- Nationality: Australia
Medal record
Men's para athletics
Representing Australia
Paralympic Games
Bronze medal – third place	1980 Arnhem	Discus throw 5
Bronze medal – third place	1988 Seoul	Discus throw 6

Rene Ahrens from Queensland is an Australian Paralympic athlete and wheelchair basketballer. At the 1980 Arnhem Paralympics, he won a bronze medal in the Men's Discus 5 event and participated in the Australia men's national wheelchair basketball team. Eight years later, he won a bronze medal at the 1988 Seoul Paralympics in the Men's Discus 6 event.
