= Margaret Ross (Paralympian) =

Australian Paralympic archer

Margaret Ross OAM
Personal information
- Full name: Margaret Winifred Ross
- Nationality: Australia
Medal record
Dartchery
Paralympic Games
Gold medal – first place	1976 Toronto	Mixed Teams Open 1962 Commonwealth Paraplegic Games in Perth, she won a silver medal in the Women's Swimming 50 m Crawl Class E event and bronze medals in the Women's Shot Put Class D and Women's Swimming 50 m Breaststroke Class E events.

Margaret Winifred Ross is an Australian Paralympic archer. At the 1962 Commonwealth Paraplegic Games in Perth, she won a silver medal in the Women's Swimming 50 m Crawl Class E event and bronze medals in the Women's Shot Put Class D and Women's Swimming 50 m Breaststroke Class E events.

She competed at the 1972 Heidelberg Paralympics in the Women's FITA Round Open finishing 5th. At the 1976 Toronto Paralympics, she competed in archery and dartchery events. She teamed with John Kestel to win the gold medal in the dartchery Mixed Teams Open event. In 1982, she received a Medal of the Order of Australia for "service to the disabled particularly in the field of sport".
