= John Kestel =

Australian Paralympic athlete

Personal information
- Nationality: Australia
Medal record
Athletics
Paralympic Games
Bronze medal – third place	1976 Toronto	Men's Javelin 2
Dartchery
Paralympic Games
Gold medal – first place	1976 Toronto	Mixed Pairs open

John Kestel is an Australian Paralympic athlete and archer. At the 1976 Toronto Games, he won a gold medal in the Mixed Pairs open dartchery event with Margaret Ross and a bronze medal in the Men's Javelin 2 event. In August 2000, before the arrival of the Olympic Torch for the 2000 Sydney Games, volunteers from the Scone area planted 2,000 trees in honour of four former Olympians or Paralympians, including Kestel, who were from the town.
