= Eric Magennis =

Personal information
- Nickname: Wheels
- Nationality: Australia
- Born: 1937/1938
Medal record
Lawn bowls
Paralympic Games
Gold medal – first place	1972 Heidelberg	Men's Singles
Gold medal – first place	1976 Toronto	Men's Pairs wh
Gold medal – first place	1984 New York/Stoke Mandeville	Men's Pairs paraplegic

Eric Magennis (born 1937/1938) is an Australian Paralympic lawn bowls player and archer. He first represented Australia in lawn bowls at the 1970 Commonwealth Paraplegic Games in Edinburgh, where he won a pairs gold medal . At the 1972 Heidelberg Paralympics, he participated in archery and became the first Australian to win a gold medal in the lawn bowls Men's Singles event. He won two further Paralympic gold medals, one with Bruce Thwaite at the 1976 Toronto Games in the Men's Pairs wh event and the other with Roy Fowler at the 1984 New York/Stoke Mandeville Games in the Men's Pairs paraplegic event. He retired from international competition in 1986, having won 78 out of the 85 games which he played over his 16-year career.

He also participated in able-bodied competition, notably as part of a team that reached the final of the 1979 New South Wales State Fours Championship. He is affectionately nicknamed "Wheels" in the bowling community. As of 1991, he was working as a lawn bowls coach in the Sydney suburb of Riverstone and throughout New South Wales. He also competed in national championships in archery, weightlifting, table tennis and pistol and rifle shooting.
