= Robert Faulkner (Paralympian) =

Australian Paralympic athlete (born 1958)

Personal information
- Full name: Robert John Faulkner
- Nationality: Australia
- Born: 29 September 1958 (age 67) Laidley
Medal record
Athletics
Paralympic Games
Silver medal – second place	1976 Toronto	Men's 100m B

Robert "Bob" Faulkner (born in 1958) is an Australian Paralympic athlete with a vision impairment, from Queensland who competed in athletics, goalball, and swimming.

At the 1976 Toronto Games, he competed in three athletics events (pentathlon, long jump, 100 m) and won a silver medal in the Men's 100 m sprint division B. At the same Games, he competed in the Men's 100 m Backstroke division B.

The next and final Paralympic Games which Faulkner competed at were in 1980 in Arnhem, Netherlands. Faulkner competed in four athletics events at these Games however, was unable to place in any of them. The events he competed in at these Games included: 100 m race, pentathlon, high jump and triple jump. At the same Games, Faulkner also competed in the Australia men's national goalball team alongside his three other teammates; David Manera, Robert McIntyre and Bruce Sandilands. The Australian team did not medal at these Games.

Robert also competed at the 1976 Arnhem Games in athletics and goalball.

Robert now lives in Brisbane where he is a father to two children and works as a sport and recreation officer.
