= Kenya at the Paralympics =

- IPC code: KEN
- NPC: Kenya National Paralympic Committee
- Medals: Gold 21 Silver 18 Bronze 16 Total 55

Summer appearances
- 1972; 1976; 1980; 1984; 1988; 1992; 1996; 2000; 2004; 2008; 2012; 2016; 2020; 2024

Kenya made its Paralympic Games début at the 1972 Summer Paralympics. It was absent in 1976, but returned to the 1980 Summer Games and has competed in every edition of the Summer Paralympics since then. It has never competed at the Winter Paralympics.

Kenyans have won a total of fifty Paralympic medals: nineteen gold, seventeen silver and fourteen bronze. All but two of these medals have been in track and field. This puts Kenya in 55th place on the all-time Paralympic Games medal table.

== Medal tables ==
=== Medals by Summer Games ===
Games	Gold	Silver	Bronze	Total
1972 Heidelberg	1	0	0	1
1980 Arnhem	1	2	0	3
1984 Stoke Mandeville	1	1	1	3
1988 Seoul	0	4	1	5
1992 Barcelona	1	0	1	2
1996 Atlanta	1	1	0	2
2000 Sydney	1	1	2	4
2004 Athens	3	1	3	7
2008 Beijing	5	3	1	9
2012 London	2	2	2	6
2016 Rio de Janeiro	3	1	2	6
2020 Tokyo	0	0	1	1
2024 Paris	0	1	0	1
Totals (13 entries)	19	17	14	50

=== Medals by Summer Sport ===
Games	Gold	Silver	Bronze	Total
Athletics	18	16	14	46
Swimming	1	0	0	1
Lawn Bowls	0	1	0	1
Total	19	17	14	50

== Medalists ==
Medal	Name	Games	Sport	Event
Gold	John Britton	(Germany) 1972 Heidelberg	Swimming	Men's 25m freestyle 2
Gold	Lucy Wanjiru	(Netherlands) 1980 Arnhem	Athletics	Women's javelin throw 3
Silver	Japheth Musyoki	(Netherlands) 1980 Arnhem	Athletics	Men's discus throw 3
Silver	Japheth Musyoki	(Netherlands) 1980 Arnhem	Athletics	Men's shot put 3
Gold	Japheth Musyoki	(United Kingdom) / (United States) 1984 Stoke Mandeville/New York	Athletics	Men's shot put 3
Silver	Japheth Musyoki	(United Kingdom) / (United States) 1984 Stoke Mandeville/New York	Athletics	Men's discus throw 3
Bronze	Lucy Wanjiru	(United Kingdom) / (United States) 1984 Stoke Mandeville/New York	Athletics	Women's javelin throw 3
Silver	Samson Mosoti	(South Korea) 1988 Seoul	Athletics	Men's javelin throw 5
Silver	Grace Muteti	(South Korea) 1988 Seoul	Athletics	Women's javelin throw 2
Silver	Lucy Wanjiru Njorogg	(South Korea) 1988 Seoul	Athletics	Women's javelin throw 3
Silver	Patricia Kihungi	(South Korea) 1988 Seoul	Lawn bowls	Women's singles 2-6
Bronze	Lucy Wanjiru Njorogg	(South Korea) 1988 Seoul	Athletics	Women's shot put 3
Gold	Mary Nakhumicha	(Spain) 1992 Barcelona	Athletics	Women's javelin throw THW7
Bronze	Rose Atieno Olang	(Spain) 1992 Barcelona	Athletics	Women's javelin throw THW7
Gold	Christopher Moori	(United States) 1996 Atlanta	Athletics	Men's javelin throw F41
Silver	Mary Nakhumicha	(United States) 1996 Atlanta	Athletics	Women's javelin throw F55-57
Gold	Henry Wanyoike	(Australia) 2000 Sydney	Athletics	Men's 5000m T11
Silver	Mary Nakhumicha	(Australia) 2000 Sydney	Athletics	Women's javelin throw F58
Bronze	Evelyne Khatsembula	(Australia) 2000 Sydney	Athletics	Women's 100m T37
Bronze	Mary Nakhumicha	(Australia) 2000 Sydney	Athletics	Women's shot put F57
Gold	Henry Wanyoike	(Greece) 2004 Athens	Athletics	Men's 5000m T11
Gold	Joseph Ngorialuk	(Greece) 2004 Athens	Athletics	Men's 5000m T13
Gold	Henry Wanyoike	(Greece) 2004 Athens	Athletics	Men's 10000m T11
Silver	Julia Longorkaye	(Greece) 2004 Athens	Athletics	Women's 1500m T12
Bronze	Emanuel Asinikal	(Greece) 2004 Athens	Athletics	Men's 1500m T13
Bronze	Frangs Karanja	(Greece) 2004 Athens	Athletics	Men's 5000m T11
Bronze	Emanuel Asinikal	(Greece) 2004 Athens	Athletics	Men's 5000m T12
Gold	Henry Kiprono Kirwa	(China) 2008 Beijing	Athletics	Men's 1500m T13
Gold	Abraham Tarbei	(China) 2008 Beijing	Athletics	Men's 1500m T46
Gold	Henry Kirwa	(China) 2008 Beijing	Athletics	Men's 5000m T13
Gold	Abraham Tarbei	(China) 2008 Beijing	Athletics	Men's 5000m T46
Gold	Henry Kirwa	(China) 2008 Beijing	Athletics	Men's 10000m T12
Silver	Samwel Kimani	(China) 2008 Beijing	Athletics	Men's 1500m T11
Silver	Francis Thuo Karanja	(China) 2008 Beijing	Athletics	Men's 5000m T11
Silver	Mary Nakhumicha	(China) 2008 Beijing	Athletics	Women's javelin throw F57-58
Bronze	Henry Wanyoike	(China) 2008 Beijing	Athletics	Men's 5000m T11
Gold	Samwel Kimani	(United Kingdom) 2012 London	Athletics	Men's 1500m T11
Gold	Abraham Tarbei	(United Kingdom) 2012 London	Athletics	Men's 1500m T46
Silver	David Korir	(United Kingdom) 2012 London	Athletics	Men's 800m T13
Silver	David Korir	(United Kingdom) 2012 London	Athletics	Men's 1500m T13
Bronze	Abraham Tarbei	(United Kingdom) 2012 London	Athletics	Men's 800m T46
Bronze	Henry Kirwa	(United Kingdom) 2012 London	Athletics	Men's 5000m T12
Gold	Samwel Kimani	(Brazil) 2016 Rio de Janeiro	Athletics	Men's 1500m T11
Gold	Samwel Kimani	(Brazil) 2016 Rio de Janeiro	Athletics	Men's 5000m T11
Gold	Henry Kirwa	(Brazil) 2016 Rio de Janeiro	Athletics	Men's 5000m T13
Silver	Nancy Koech	(Brazil) 2016 Rio de Janeiro	Athletics	Women's 1500m T11
Bronze	Henry Kirwa	(Brazil) 2016 Rio de Janeiro	Athletics	Men's 1500m T13
Bronze	Wilson Bii	(Brazil) 2016 Rio de Janeiro	Athletics	Men's 5000m T11
Bronze	Nancy Chelangat Koech	(Japan) 2020 Tokyo	Athletics	Women's 1500m T11
Silver	Samson Opiyo	(France) 2024 Paris	Athletics	Men's long jump T37

== See also ==
- Kenya at the Olympics
