= Athletics at the 2016 Summer Paralympics – Men's 5000 metres =

Athletics – Men's 5000 metres at the XV Paralympic Games
- Venue: Estádio Olímpico João Havelange
- Dates: 8 – 16 September 2024
- No. of events: 3
- Competitors: 32

The Men's 800m athletics events for the 2016 Summer Paralympics took place at the Estádio Olímpico João Havelange from September 8 to September 16, 2016. One event was contested over this distance for 19 different classifications.

== Schedule ==
R	Round 1	½	Semifinals	F	Final

Event↓/Date →	Thu 8	Fri 9	Sat 10	Sun 11	Mon 12	Tue 13	Wed 14	Thu 15	Fri 16	Sat 17
T11 5000m	F									
T13 5000m								F		
T54 5000m		R		F						

== Medal summary ==
Classification	Gold		Silver		Bronze	
T11	Samwel Mushai Kimani guide: James Boit; Kenya	15:16.11 PB	Odair Santos guide: Eriton Nascimento; Brazil	15:17.55	Wilson Bii guide: Benard Korir; Kenya	15:22.96 PB
T13	Henry Kirwa (T12); Kenya	14:17.32	El Amin Chentouf (T12); Morocco	14.21.04	Bilel Aloui; Tunisia	14:33.33
T54	Prawat Wahoram; Thailand	11:01.71	Marcel Hug; Switzerland	11.02.04	Kurt Fearnley; Australia	11:02.37

== Results ==
The following were the results of the finals of each of the Men's 5000 metres events in each of the classifications. Further details of each event are available on that event's dedicated page.

=== T11 ===
The T11 category is for athletes with a visual impairment. A T11 athlete may be entirely without sight, or be able to perceive light, but have no ability to see the shape of a hand at any distance. T11 athletes commonly run with guides.

The Men's 5000 metres T11 event at the 2016 Summer Paralympics took place at the Rio Olympic Stadium on 8 September.

The event was undertaken as a single final for all competitors, using guides. It was the first medal awarded at the 2016 Summer Paralympics, and was won by Kenya's Samwel Mushai Kimani, holding off the host's world champion Odair Santos, who took silver ahead of Kenyan Wilson Bii.

Rank	Athlete	Country	Time	Notes
1st place, gold medalist(s)	Samwel Mushai Kimani; Guide: James Boit	Kenya	15:16.11	PB
2nd place, silver medalist(s)	Odair Santos; Guide: Carlos Santos	Brazil	15:17.55	
3rd place, bronze medalist(s)	Wilson Bii; Guide: Benard Korir	Kenya	15:22.96	PB
4	Hasan Huseyin Kacar; Guide: Muhammet Ugur Cakir	Turkey	15:49.52	PB
5	Zhang Zhen; Guide: Zhang Mingyang	China	15:53.47	
6	Shinya Wada; Guide: Takashi Nakata	Japan	16:02.97	
7	Darwin Castro; Guide: Sebastian Rosero	Ecuador	16:25.38	
8	Nuno Alves; Guide: Ricardo Abreu	Portugal	17:03.64	
9	Erick Kipto Sang; Guide: Bernard Kipkurui Terer	Kenya	DQ	
-	Cristian Valenzuela; Guide: Jonathan Balados	Chile	DNS	-

=== T13 ===
The T13 category is for athletes with a moderate visual impairment. Athletes in this category have a variety of visual impairments, but can typically recognize contours from a distance of 2 to 6 metres. Athletes in this category do not typically require a guide.

10:00 15 September 2016:

Rank	Lane	Bib	Name	Nationality	Reaction	Time	Notes
1st place, gold medalist(s)	3	1763	Henry Kirwa	Kenya		14:17.32	
2nd place, silver medalist(s)	8	1850	El Amin Chentouf	Morocco		14:21.04	
3rd place, bronze medalist(s)	10	2270	Bilel Aloui	Tunisia		14:33.33	
4	7	1211	Guillaume Ouellet	Canada		14:54.07	
5	9	1147	Yeltsin Jacques	Brazil		15:02.13	
6	6	1849	Youssef Benibrahim	Morocco		15:06.63	
7	11	1047	Jaryd Clifford	Australia		15:06.64	
8	1	2349	Chaz Davis	United States		15:15.86	
9	12	2276	Bilel Hammami	Tunisia		15:15.90	
10	4	2038	Lukasz Wietecki	Poland		15:36.04	
	2	1135	Julio Cesar Agripino dos Santos	Brazil			DSQ
	5	1423	Gustavo Nieves	Spain			DSQ

=== T54 ===
The T54 category is for wheelchair athletes with no leg function, but near full arm function and reasonable to normal trunk function. Typically this may be caused by a lower spinal cord injury or spinal cord birth defect.

10:15 11 September 2016:

Rank	Lane	Bib	Name	Nationality	Reaction	Time	Notes
1st place, gold medalist(s)	3	2236	Prawat Wahoram	Thailand		11:01.71	
2nd place, silver medalist(s)	6	2179	Marcel Hug	Switzerland		11:02.04	
3rd place, bronze medalist(s)	8	1051	Kurt Fearnley	Australia		11:02.37	
4	10	1731	Masayuki Higuchi	Japan		11:02.54	
5	1	2352	Joshua George	United States		11:02.64	
6	7	2234	Rawat Tana	Thailand		11:02.72	
7	5	2235	Khajonsak Thamsopon	Thailand		11:02.80	
8	4	1536	Alhassane Balde	Germany		11:03.00	
9	2	1777	Suk Man Hong	South Korea		11:03.78	
10	9	1203	Josh Cassidy	Canada		11:09.42	

Q = qualified by place. q = qualified by time. DQ = disqualified RR = Regional Record. PB = Personal Best. SB = Seasonal Best. DNF = Did not finish. DNS = Did not start.
