= Kenya at the 2008 Summer Paralympics =

- IPC code: KEN
- NPC: Kenya National Paralympic Committee

in Beijing
- Competitors: 13 in 2 sports
- Flag bearer: Henry Wanyoike
- Medals Ranked 27th: Gold 5 Silver 3 Bronze 1 Total 9

Summer Paralympics appearances (overview)
- 1972; 1976; 1980; 1984; 1988; 1992; 1996; 2000; 2004; 2008; 2012; 2016; 2020; 2024

Kenya competed at the 2008 Summer Paralympics in Beijing. The country's delegation consisted of thirteen competitors captained by three-time Paralympic gold medalist Henry Wanyoike. Also on the team was javelin thrower Mary Nakhumicha. Wanyoike competed in the 5000 metres, 10000 metres, and the marathon.

== Medallists ==
Medal	Name	Sport	Event
Gold	Henry Kiprono Kirwa	Athletics	Men's 1500m T13
Gold	Abraham Cheruiyot Tarbei	Athletics	Men's 1500m T46
Gold	Henry Kiprono Kirwa	Athletics	Men's 5000m T13
Gold	Abraham Cheruiyot Tarbei	Athletics	Men's 5000m T46
Gold	Henry Kiprono Kirwa	Athletics	Men's 10000m T12
Silver	Samwel Mushai Kimani	Athletics	Men's 1500m T11
Silver	Francis Thuo Karanja	Athletics	Men's 5000m T11
Silver	Nakhumicha Zakayo	Athletics	Women's javelin throw F57-58
Bronze	Henry Wanyoike	Athletics	Men's 5000m T11

=== Athletics ===
==== Men's track ====
Athlete	Class	Event	Heats		Final	
Athlete	Class	Event	Result	Rank	Result	Rank
Andrew Adimo Auma	T13	400m	51.03	7 q	50.70	7
Abraham Cheruiyot Tarbei	T46	1500m	4:07.59	2 Q	3:52.50 WR	1st place, gold medalist(s)
Abraham Cheruiyot Tarbei	T46	5000m	—		14:20.88 WR	1st place, gold medalist(s)
Henry Kiprono Kirwa	T12	10000m	—		31:42.97 PR	1st place, gold medalist(s)
Henry Kiprono Kirwa	T13	1500m	4:00.99	1 Q	4:06.11	1st place, gold medalist(s)
Henry Kiprono Kirwa	T13	5000m	15:45.71	5 Q	14:24.02 WR	1st place, gold medalist(s)
Samwel Mushai Kimani	T11	1500m	4:18.66	5 Q	4:11.76	2nd place, silver medalist(s)
Samwel Mushai Kimani	T12	800m	2:00.08	8	did not advance	
Francis Thuo Karanja	T11	1500m	4:25.33	10	did not advance	
Francis Thuo Karanja	T11	5000m	—		15:32.28	2nd place, silver medalist(s)
Francis Thuo Karanja	T12	10000m	—		33:03.51	5
Simon Wambagu	T46	400m	50.48	8 Q	53.32	7
Simon Wambagu	T46	800m	1:59.95	8 q	1:57.86	6
Stephen Wambua Musyoki	T46	800m	1:56.12	2 Q	1:54.63	5
Stephen Wambua Musyoki	T46	1500m	4:10.53	10 q	3:57.21	6
Henry Wanyoike	T11	5000m	—		15:47.17	3rd place, bronze medalist(s)
Henry Wanyoike	T12	Marathon	—		DNF	

==== Men's field ====
Athlete	Class	Event	Final		
Athlete	Class	Event	Result	Points	Rank
David Rono Boit	F57-58	Javelin throw	34.40	886	11

==== Women's track ====
Athlete	Class	Event	Heats		Final	
Athlete	Class	Event	Result	Rank	Result	Rank
Nelly Nasimiyu Munialo	T13	1500m	—		4:56.88	7

==== Women's field ====
Athlete	Class	Event	Final		
Athlete	Class	Event	Result	Points	Rank
Hanah Ngendo Mwangi	F12	Long jump	4.91	-	12
Nakhumicha Zakayo	F57-58	Javelin throw	22.64	1137	2nd place, silver medalist(s)

=== Powerlifting ===
==== Men ====
Athlete	Event	Result	Rank
Samson Okutto	56kg	165.0	8

== See also ==
- Kenya at the Paralympics
- Kenya at the 2008 Summer Olympics
