= Athletics at the 2016 Summer Paralympics – Men's 1500 metres T11 =

Men's 1500 metres T11 at the XV Paralympic Games
- Venue: Estádio Olímpico João Havelange
- Dates: 11–13 September 2016
- Competitors: 17 from 15 nations

Medalists
1st place, gold medalist(s)		Samwel Mushai Kimani	Kenya
2nd place, silver medalist(s)		Odair Santos	Brazil
3rd place, bronze medalist(s)		Semih Deniz	Turkey

The T11 category is for athletes with a visual impairment. A T11 athlete may be entirely without sight, or be able to perceive light, but have no ability to see the shape of a hand at any distance. T11 athletes commonly run with guides.

The Athletics at the 2016 Summer Paralympics – Men's 1500 metres T11 event at the 2016 Paralympic Games took place on 11–13 September 2016, at the Estádio Olímpico João Havelange.

== Heats ==
=== Heat 1 ===
12:23 11 September 2016:

Rank	Lane	Bib	Name	Nationality	Reaction	Time	Notes
1	6	2288	Semih Deniz	Turkey		4:11.75	Q
2	5	1618	Ankur Dhama	India		4:37.61	
3	1	1584	Oscar Raxon Siquiej	Guatemala		4:57.22	
	3	1645	Hamid Eslami	Iran			DSQ
	2	2025	Aleksander Kossakowski	Poland			DSQ
	4	1228	Cristian Valenzuela	Chile			DSQ

=== Heat 2 ===
12:30 11 September 2016:

Rank	Lane	Bib	Name	Nationality	Reaction	Time	Notes
1	3	1762	Samwel Mushai Kimani	Kenya		4:04.50	Q
2	5	1162	Odair Santos	Brazil		4:05.34	q
3	1	1746	Shinya Wada	Japan		4:16.12	q
4	2	1269	Zhen Zhang	China		4:16.88	
5	4	2044	Nuno Alves	Portugal		4:36.32	

=== Heat 3 ===
12:37 11 September 2016:

Rank	Lane	Bib	Name	Nationality	Reaction	Time	Notes
1	2	1761	Wilson Bii	Kenya		4:13.20	Q
2	1	1206	Jason Joseph Dunkerley	Canada		4:14.99	q
3	5	1396	Darwin Castro	Ecuador		4:21.29	
4	3	1994	Luis Sandoval	Peru		4:28.41	
	6	2289	Hasan Huseyin Kacar	Turkey			DSQ
	4	2059	Chol Ung Kim	North Korea			DSQ

== Final ==
18:05 13 September 2016:

Rank	Lane	Bib	Name	Nationality	Reaction	Time	Notes
1st place, gold medalist(s)	3	1762	Samwel Mushai Kimani	Kenya		4:03.25	
2nd place, silver medalist(s)	2	1162	Odair Santos	Brazil		4:03.85	
3rd place, bronze medalist(s)	1	2288	Semih Deniz	Turkey		4:05.42	
4	5	1761	Wilson Bii	Kenya		4:07.96	
5	6	1206	Jason Joseph Dunkerley	Canada		4:07.98	
6	4	1746	Shinya Wada	Japan		4:15.62	
