= Kenya at the 2012 Summer Paralympics =

- IPC code: KEN
- NPC: Kenya National Paralympic Committee

in London
- Competitors: 13 in 1 sport
- Medals Ranked 40th: Gold 2 Silver 2 Bronze 2 Total 6

Summer Paralympics appearances (overview)
- 1972; 1976; 1980; 1984; 1988; 1992; 1996; 2000; 2004; 2008; 2012; 2016; 2020; 2024

Kenya competed at the 2012 Summer Paralympics in London, United Kingdom from August 29 to September 9, 2012, where they were represented by thirteen athletes who won six medals at these games, two gold, two silver and two bronze. All the country's Paralympians competed in athletics. Kenya had originally qualified a larger team, and in more sports like powerlifting and rowing.

== Team ==
The country sent a 13 strong athlete delegation to London, composed of 11 men and 2 women. It was originally scheduled to send 16 athletes. Kenya's team for these Games included captain Henry Wanyoike, and athletes David Korir, Henry Kirwa, Abraham Tarbei, Jonah Chesum, Stanley Cheruiyot, Emmanuel Cheruiyot, Wilson Bii, Francis Thuo, Hanah Ng'endo, Henry Nzungi, Mary Nakhumicha, David Boit, Samwel Mushai, Egla Mosop and Nelly Nasimiyu. The team included people who had survived polio.

Kenya had earned and subsequently been given via the allocation process more sportspeople than it ended up sending to London. Female vision impaired runner Lenny Nasimiyu has hoped to make the London Games, but she could not go as she had a knee injury. Nancy Chelagat was supposed also to be on the team, participating in the 5,000m and 1,500m T11 events. Kenya was supposed to send a rower to London, Itaken Timoi. He had earned a wildcard berth to the Games. Kenya was allocated a wildcard allocation for powerlifting in London. This spot was for Gabriel Magu.

== Medallists ==
The following Kenyan athletes won medals at the 2012 games. In total 6 medals were won, all in Men's Athletics. Kenya finished fortieth overall on the medal table.

Medal	Name	Sport	Event	Date
Gold	Samwel Kimani	Athletics	Men's 1500m T11	3 September
Gold	Abraham Tarbei	Athletics	Men's 1500m T46	4 September
Silver	David Korir	Athletics	Men's 1500m T13	4 September
Silver	David Korir	Athletics	Men's 800m T13	8 September
Bronze	Henry Kirwa	Athletics	Men's 5000m T12	3 September
Bronze	Abraham Tarbei	Athletics	Men's 800m T46	8 September

== Athletics ==
The team included Henry Kirwa, Wilson Bii, Erick Sang, and Henry Sugi. The country had 28 athletes who met the A-qualifying standard for the London Games. The IPC allocated 19 spots to Kenya.

Men's Track and Road Events

The 2012 Games continued the successful athletics run for Kenya that started in Athens, with the nation claiming two golds in the sport.

Vision impaired runner Henry Wanyoike was the captain of the Kenyan Paralympic athletics team in London as a 38-year-old. Unlike the 2008 Games, Kirwa was unable to set any world records in London. Ahead of the London Games, Wanyoike trained with Joseph Kibunja, his guide runner. They were based in Kikuyu, and ran outside through the local terrain. He had hoped to compete in the marathon in London. Part of the reason he was able to compete in London was a result of sponsorship from Standard Chartered.

Henry Kirwa was back for the London Games, previously having competed at the Paralympics. Between Beijing and London, he was named the Kenyan of the Year by the United Nations. Medalling at these Games, his performance insured that he became Kenya's most decorated Paralympian in history following his debut in Beijing, claiming 4 golds and 2 silvers between 2008 and 2016.

David Korir won a silver medal for Kenya in the Men's 800m T13 event on September 6. Samwel Mushai ran with guide runner James Boit in London. He claimed gold in the men's T11 1,500m event in a time of 3:58.37. Henry Nzungi Mwendo made the finals of the men's T12 200m. Abraham Tarbei won Kenya's second gold of the Games, after winning the men's T46 1,500 m in a time of 3.50.15. Sugi ran in the men's T12 100 and 200m events. Wanyoike competed in the 5000 metres, 10000 metres, and the marathon.

Athlete	Event	Heat		Semifinal		Final	
Athlete	Event	Result	Rank	Result	Rank	Result	Rank
Henry Mwendo	200m T12	22.88	4 q	23.24	4	Did not advance	
Henry Mwendo	400m T12	52.67	4	Did not advance			
David Korir	800m T13	1:54.56	1 Q	—N/a		1:53.16	2nd place, silver medalist(s)
David Korir	1500m T13	3:53.96	1 Q	—N/a		3:48.84	2nd place, silver medalist(s)
Stanley Cheruiyot	800m T46	1:59.23	3 Q	—N/a		2:03.78	7
Stanley Cheruiyot	1500m T46	4:01.58	5 q	—N/a		4:02.54	11
Jonah Chesum	800m T46	1:55.51	4 q	—N/a		1:56.57	6
Jonah Chesum	1500m T46	3:59.72	2 Q	—N/a		4:00.38	7
Abraham Tarbei	800m T46	1:55.39	3 Q	—N/a		1:53.03	3rd place, bronze medalist(s)
Abraham Tarbei	1500m T46	3:59.79	1 Q	—N/a		3:50.15	1st place, gold medalist(s)
Samwel Kimani	1500m T11	4:09.44	1 Q	—N/a		3:58.37	1st place, gold medalist(s)
Immanuel Cheruiyot	1500m T11	DSQ		—N/a		Did not advance	
Immanuel Cheruiyot	5000m T11	—N/a				16:39.73	10
Henry Kirwa	1500m T13	3:55.35	2 Q	—N/a		3:53.55	5
Henry Kirwa	5000m T12	—N/a				14:20.76	3rd place, bronze medalist(s)
Wilson Bii	5000m T11	—N/a				DNF	
Francis Karanja	5000m T11	—N/a				15:56.67	4
Henry Wanyoike	Marathon T12	—N/a				DNF	

Women's Track and Road Events

Hannah Ngendo Mwangi was disqualified from one of her events because of a false start.

Athlete	Event	Heat		Semifinal		Final	
Athlete	Event	Result	Rank	Result	Rank	Result	Rank
Hanah Mwangi	100m T12	13.58	3	Did not advance			
Hanah Mwangi	200m T12	DSQ		—N/a		Did not advance	
Hanah Mwangi	400m T12	DSQ		Did not advance			

Women's Field Events

Athlete	Event	Distance	Points	Rank
Mary Zakayo	Shot Put F57-58	7.70	677	13
Mary Zakayo	Discus Throw F57-58	17.53	399	15
Mary Zakayo	Javelin Throw F57-58	16.86	650	13

== Qualification ==
Kenya attempted to qualify for the London Games in men's sitting volleyball. They missed the Games after losing to Rwanda during qualification.

== See also ==
- Kenya at the 2012 Summer Olympics
