= Athletics at the 2012 Summer Paralympics – Men's 5000 metres =

Athletics – Men's 5000 metres at the XIV Paralympic Games
- Venue: London Olympic Stadium
- Dates: 31 August – 7 September 2024
- No. of events: 3

The Men's 5000m athletics events for the 2012 Summer Paralympics took place at the London Olympic Stadium from 31 August to 7 September. A total of three events were contested over this distance for three different classifications.

== Schedule ==
R	Round 1	½	Semifinals	F	Final

Event↓/Date →	Fri 31	Sat 1	Sun 2	Mon 3	Tue 4	Wed 5	Thr 6	Fri 7
T11 5000m						R		F
T12 5000m	R			F				
T54 5000m	R	½	F					

== Results ==
=== T11 ===
The T11 category is for athletes with a visual impairment. A T11 athlete may be entirely without sight, or be able to perceive light, but have no ability to see the shape of a hand at any distance. T11 athletes commonly run with guides.

Top five finishers:

Rank	Athlete	Country	Time	Notes
1st place, gold medalist(s)	Cristian Valenzuela; Guide: Cristopher Guajardo	Chile	15:26.26	PB
2nd place, silver medalist(s)	Jason Joseph Dunkerley; Guide: Josh Karanja	Canada	15:34.07	PB
3rd place, bronze medalist(s)	Shinya Wada	Japan	15:55.26	RR
4	Francis Thuo Karanja; Guide: James Kuria Karanja	Kenya	15:56.67	PB
5	Nuno Alves	Portugal	16:06.28	SB

=== T12 ===
The T12 category is for athletes with visual impairment. Athletes in this category will generally have some residual sight, the ability to recognise the shape of a hand at a distance of 2 metres and the ability to perceive clearly will be no more than 2/60. T12 athletes commonly run with guides.

Top five finishers:

Rank	Athlete	Country	Time	Notes
1st place, gold medalist(s)	El Amin Chentouf	Morocco	13:53.76	WR
2nd place, silver medalist(s)	Abderrahim Zhiou	Tunisia	14:19.97	PB
3rd place, bronze medalist(s)	Henry Kirwa	Kenya	14:20.76	PB
4	Gustavo Nieves	Spain	14:22.93	RR
5	Tadashi Horikoshi	Japan	14:48.89	RR

=== T54 ===
The T54 category is for wheelchair athletes with no leg function, but near full arm function and reasonable to normal trunk function. Typically this may be caused by a lower spinal cord injury or spinal cord birth defect.

Final

Top five finishers:

Rank	Athlete	Country	Time	Notes
1st place, gold medalist(s)	David Weir	Great Britain	11:07.65	
2nd place, silver medalist(s)	Kurt Fearnley	Australia	11:07.90	
3rd place, bronze medalist(s)	Julien Casoli	France	11:08.07	
4	Marcel Hug	Switzerland	11:08.16	
5	Prawat Wahoram	Thailand	11:08.55	
