= Kenya at the 2004 Summer Paralympics =

- IPC code: KEN
- NPC: Kenya National Paralympic Committee

in Athens
- Competitors: 16 in 1 sport
- Medals Ranked 37th: Gold 3 Silver 1 Bronze 3 Total 7

Summer Paralympics appearances (overview)
- 1972; 1976; 1980; 1984; 1988; 1992; 1996; 2000; 2004; 2008; 2012; 2016; 2020; 2024

Kenya competed at the 2004 Summer Paralympics in Athens, Greece. Their delegation included 16 athletes, 8 men and 8 women, who won 3 golds, 1 silver and 3 bronze medals. Institutional problems inside Kenyan elite disability sport impact the country's performance at the Paralympic Games.

== Team ==
The Kenyan delegation included 8 men and 8 women. The 2004 Games were the ones with the largest number of women representing Kenya in the country's Paralympic history.

== Background ==
A number of factors have impacted the development of elite disability sport in Kenya in this period. One factor was negative cultural attitudes towards people with disabilities in general that made it difficult to participate, even if the athlete had won a Commonwealth Games medal. A second variable was coaching issues. These included poor qualifications for coaches, lack of funding for coaches, inconsistent coaching or coaches having hidden agendas for being involved in para-sport, such as a desire to travel overseas. A third issue was lack of available equipment to train with. Part of this was because of the high cost of specialized equipment. Another part was a desire not to spend money on people with disabilities as they are less worthy of the funding. A fourth issue is that facilities are often not accessible to people with disabilities. Sometimes, venues do not want to let people with disabilities use them. Sometimes, facilities lack accommodations for people with disabilities. A fifth problem was transportation. Transportation around cities is often not handicap accessible, making it difficult for elite athletes to get to training venues. Ethnic favoritism was a sixth problem impacting elite para-sport. There was a perception among elite athletes that the government and sporting officials favored certain ethnic groups. According to one elite athlete, for the 2000 Games, the team was dominated by ethnic Luo. For the 2004 Games, the trend was towards ethnic Kikuyu. In athletics, the preference tended to be towards Kalenjin. The last major issue was lack of financial support for participating in sport at the elite level. More Kenyans would have tried to represent their country at the Paralympic level, but they were unable to afford it despite the desire to do so.

The above existed against a broad issue about perceptions in Black Africa about people with disabilities. In many parts of Black Africa, people who have disabilities that include intellectual disabilities, and physical disabilities such as impairments and deformities often face cultural barriers to participation because of attitudes related to their disabilities. These include beliefs that they acquired their disabilities because their parents were witches or they are wizards. Their disability is often seen as a result of a personal failing on their part. As such, there is often tremendous cultural pressure for people with physical disabilities to remain hidden and out of the public eye. In many places, they are perceived to be monsters in need of healing. In a Kenyan context, the "bad blood" of people with disabilities is thought to also impact their families, creating further stigma for the person with the disability.

== Medalists ==
Medal	Name	Sport	Event
Gold	Henry Wanyoike	Athletics	Men's 5000m T11
Gold	Joseph Ngorialuk	Athletics	Men's 5000m T13
Gold	Henry Wanyoike	Athletics	Men's 10000m T11
Silver	Julia Longorkaye	Athletics	Women's 1500m T12
Bronze	Emanuel Asinikal	Athletics	Men's 1500m T13
Bronze	Frangs Karanja	Athletics	Men's 5000m T11
Bronze	Emanuel Asinikal	Athletics	Men's 5000m T12

== Athletics ==
=== Men's track ===
Athlete	Class	Event	Heats		Semifinal		Final	
Athlete	Class	Event	Result	Rank	Result	Rank	Result	Rank
Emanuel Asinikal	T12	1500m	4:04.19	9 q	N/A		3:54.74	3rd place, bronze medalist(s)
Emanuel Asinikal	T12	5000m	N/A				15:09.67	3rd place, bronze medalist(s)
Andrew A. Auma	T12	400m	DSQ		did not advance			
Andrew A. Auma	T12	800m	1:57.31	1 Q	N/A		1:55.75	4
Andrew A. Auma	T13	1500m	4:13.97	14	did not advance			
Frangs Karanja	T11	1500m	N/A				4:25.89	6
Frangs Karanja	T11	5000m	N/A				16:05.38	3rd place, bronze medalist(s)
Duncan Kipkemei	T12	400m	54.56	11	did not advance			
Duncan Kipkemei	T12	800m	2:03.51	9	did not advance			
Duncan Kipkemei	T13	1500m	4:18.05	19	did not advance			
Joseph Ngorialuk	T13	5000m	N/A				15:21.25	1st place, gold medalist(s)
Joseph Ngorialuk	T13	Marathon	N/A				2:49:08	7
Henry Wanyoike	T11	5000m	N/A				15:11.07 WR	1st place, gold medalist(s)
Henry Wanyoike	T11	10000m	N/A				31:37.25 WR	1st place, gold medalist(s)

=== Women's track ===
Athlete	Class	Event	Heats		Semifinal		Final	
Athlete	Class	Event	Result	Rank	Result	Rank	Result	Rank
Julia Longorkaye	T12	400m	1:07.66	11	did not advance			
Julia Longorkaye	T12	800m	2:24.22	7	did not advance			
Julia Longorkaye	T12	1500m	N/A				4:41.71	2nd place, silver medalist(s)
Nelly Munialo	T12	100m	14.54	15	did not advance			
Nelly Munialo	T12	200m	29.22	11	did not advance			
Eunice Njoroge	T36	100m	N/A				22.18	8
Eunice Njoroge	T36	200m	N/A				46.21	8

=== Women's field ===
Athlete	Class	Event	Final		
Athlete	Class	Event	Result	Points	Rank
Phelomena Chepkoech	F56-58	Discus	16.78	709	15
Phelomena Chepkoech	F56-58	Javelin	18.10	875	7
Phelomena Chepkoech	F56-58	Shot put	6.47	782	15
Alice Kibue	F32-34/51-53	Discus	8.49	614	10
Alice Kibue	F32-34/52/53	Shot put	2.94	854	10
Alice Kibue	F33/34/52/53	Javelin	5.76	679	10
Christine Rongoe	F56-58	Javelin	9.44	456	14
Mary Zakayo	F56-58	Discus	17.34	559	18
Mary Zakayo	F56-58	Javelin	17.68	707	12
Mary Zakayo	F56-58	Shot put	8.03	971	10

=== Powerlifting ===
==== Men ====
Athlete	Event	Result	Rank
Samson Abayyo Okutto	56kg	140.0	7

== See also ==
- Kenya at the Paralympics
- Kenya at the 2004 Summer Olympics
