= Athletics at the 2012 Summer Paralympics – Men's 5000 metres T12 =

Men's 5000 metres T12 at the XIV Paralympic Games
- Venue: London Olympic Stadium
- Dates: 3 September
- Competitors: 9 from 7 nations
- Winning time: 13:53.76

Medalists
1st place, gold medalist(s)		El Amin Chentouf	Morocco
2nd place, silver medalist(s)		Abderrahim Zhiou	Tunisia
3rd place, bronze medalist(s)		Henry Kirwa	Kenya

Athletics at the 2012 Summer Paralympics
Classification
T/F11–13: Blind and visually impaired
T/F20: Intellectual disability
T/F31–38: Cerebral palsy
F40: Les Autres
T/F42–46: Amputees
T/F51–58: Spinal cord disability
Men T/F11–13
Track
100 m	T11	T12	T13
200 m	T11	T12	T13
400 m	T11	T12	T13
800 m		T12	T13
1500 m	T11		T13
5000 m	T11	T12
4×100 m relay	T11–13
Road
Marathon		T12
Field
Long jump	F11		F13
Triple jump	F11	F12
Shot put	F11–12
Discus throw	F11
Javelin throw		F12–13
Women T/F11–13
Track
100 m	T11	T12	T13
200 m	T11	T12
400 m		T12	T13
1500 m		T12
Field
Long jump	F11–12		F13
Shot put	F11–12
Discus throw	F11–12
Javelin throw		F12–13

The Men's 5000 metres T12 event at the 2012 Summer Paralympics took place at the London Olympic Stadium on 3 September.

The T12 category is for athletes with visual impairment. Athletes in this category will generally have some residual sight, the ability to recognise the shape of a hand at a distance of 2 metres and the ability to perceive clearly will be no more than 2/60. T12 athletes commonly run with guides.

== Records ==
Prior to the competition, the existing World and Paralympic records were as follows:

World & Paralympic record	Henry Kiprono Kirwa (KEN)	14:24.02	11 September 2008	Beijing, China
Broken records during the 2012 Summer Paralympics
World record	El Amin Chentouf (MAR)	13:53.76	3 September 2012	

== Results ==
Competed 3 September 2012 at 20:05.

Rank	Athlete	Country	Time	Notes
1st place, gold medalist(s)	El Amin Chentouf	Morocco	13:53.76	WR
2nd place, silver medalist(s)	Abderrahim Zhiou	Tunisia	14:19.97	PB
3rd place, bronze medalist(s)	Henry Kiprono Kirwa	Kenya	14:20.76	PB
4	Gustavo Nieves	Spain	14:22.93	RR
5	Tadashi Horikoshi	Japan	14:48.89	RR
6	Alberto Suárez Laso	Spain	14:50.28	PB
7	Nacer-Eddine Karfas	Algeria	15:11.41	SB
8	Masahiro Okamura	Japan	15:45.98	
	Jose Luis Santero; Guide: Jorge Luchik	Argentina	DQ	

Q = qualified by place. q = qualified by time. WR = World Record. RR = Regional Record. PB = Personal Best. SB = Seasonal Best.
