= Kenya at the 2000 Summer Paralympics =

- IPC code: KEN
- NPC: Kenya National Paralympic Committee

in Sydney
- Competitors: 13 in 1 sport
- Medals Ranked 46th: Gold 1 Silver 1 Bronze 2 Total 4

Summer Paralympics appearances (overview)
- 1972; 1976; 1980; 1984; 1988; 1992; 1996; 2000; 2004; 2008; 2012; 2016; 2020; 2024

Kenya competed at the 2000 Summer Paralympics. They were represented by 13 sportspeople, 5 women and 8 men, at the Sydney, Australia hosted Games. Kenyan Paralympians won four medals at these games, one gold, one silver and two bronze.

== Team ==
Kenya was represented by 5 women and 8 men at the 2000 Summer Paralympics. The team included athlete Henry Wanyoike, Mary Nakhumicha, and Evelyne Khatsembula.

== Background ==
A number of factors have impacted the development of elite disability sport in Kenya in this period. One factor was negative cultural attitudes towards people with disabilities in general that made it difficult to participate, even if the athlete had won a Commonwealth Games medal. A second variable was coaching issues. These included poor qualifications for coaches, lack of funding for coaches, inconsistent coaching or coaches having hidden agendas for being involved in para-sport, such as a desire to travel overseas. A third issue was lack of available equipment to train with. Part of this was because of the high cost of specialized equipment. Another part was a desire not to spend money on people with disabilities as they are less worthy of the funding. A fourth issue is that facilities are often not accessible to people with disabilities. Sometimes, venues do not want to let people with disabilities use them. Sometimes, facilities lack accommodations for people with disabilities. A fifth problem was transportation. Transportation around cities is often not handicap accessible, making it difficult for elite athletes to get to training venues. Ethnic favoritism was a sixth problem impacting elite para-sport. There was a perception among elite athletes that the government and sporting officials favored certain ethnic groups. According to one elite athlete, for the 2004 Games, the team was dominated by ethnic Luo. For the 2008 Games, the trend was towards ethnic Kikuyu. In athletics, the preference tended to be towards Kalenjin. The last major issue was lack of financial support for participating in sport at the elite level. More Kenyans would have tried to represent their country at the Paralympic level, but they were unable to afford it despite the desire to do so.

The above existed against a broad issue about perceptions in Black Africa about people with disabilities. In many parts of Black Africa, people who have disabilities that include intellectual disabilities, and physical disabilities such as impairments and deformities often face cultural barriers to participation because of attitudes related to their disabilities. These include beliefs that they acquired their disabilities because their parents were witches or they are wizards. Their disability is often seen as a result of a personal failing on their part. As such, there is often tremendous cultural pressure for people with physical disabilities to remain hidden and out of the public eye. In many places, they are perceived to be monsters in need of healing. In a Kenyan context, the "bad blood" of people with disabilities is thought to also impact their families, creating further stigma for the person with the disability.

== Medals ==
Kenyan Paralympians won four medals at these games, one gold, one silver and two bronze.

| Medal | Name | Sport | Event |
|---|---|---|---|
| Gold | Henry Wanyoike | Athletics | Men's 5000m T11 |
| Silver | Mary Nakhumicha | Athletics | Women's javelin F58 |
| Bronze | Evelyne Khatsembula | Athletics | Women's 100m T37 |
| Bronze | Mary Nakhumicha | Athletics | Women's shot put F57 |

== Athletics ==
Making his Paralympic debut, Henry Wanyoike competed in the 5,000 m event, and won gold in a race where his guide runner collapsed at the finish line. His victory was the first by an African athlete in his category in the 5,000m. Following the Games, he was awarded the Order of the Grand Warrior Award (OGW) by President Moi. Wanyoike, an active athlete in his childhood, had a stroke in 1995 when he was 20 years old, which left him blind soon afterwards.

Mary Nakhumicha, building on her success at the 1996 Atlanta Games, won silver in the javelin throw and bronze in the shot put in her category.

== See also ==
- Kenya at the 2000 Summer Olympics
- Kenya at the Paralympics

== Bibliography ==
- International Paralympic Committee (2000). "Appendix C: Athlete Numbers - By Delegation". Sydney 2000 Paralympic Games Post Games Report. Sydney.
