= Athletics at the 2008 Summer Paralympics – Men's 10000 metres =

The Men's 10,000m T12 had its Final held on September 14 at 18:53.

== Medalists ==
Gold	Henry Kiprono Kirwa; Kenya
Silver	Abderrahim Zhiou; Tunisia
Bronze	Odair Santos; Brazil

== Results ==
Place	Athlete	Class	Final
1	Henry Kiprono Kirwa (KEN)	T12	31:42.97 PR
2	Abderrahim Zhiou (TUN)	T12	31:43.15
3	Odair Santos (BRA)	T12	31:57.91
4	Elkin Serna (COL)	T12	32:39.24
5	Francis Thuo Karanja (KEN)	T11	33:03.51
6	Moisés Beristain (MEX)	T12	33:17.07
7	Alex Mendonça (BRA)	T12	33:48.45
8	Ali Elahi (IRI)	T12	34:38.75
9	Vedran Lozanov (CRO)	T12	35:04.76
	Linas Balsys (LTU)	T12	DNF
	Manuel Garnica Roldan (ESP)	T12	DNF
	Diosmany Gonzalez (CUB)	T12	DNF
	Luis Herrera (MEX)	T12	DNF
	Gabriel Macchi (POR)	T12	DNF
	Ildar Pomykalov (RUS)	T12	DNF
	Aurélio Santos (BRA)	T12	DNF
