= Athletics at the 2016 Summer Paralympics – Men's 5000 metres T11 =

Men's 5000 metres T11 at the XV Paralympic Games
- Venue: Rio Olympic Stadium
- Dates: 8 September
- Competitors: 10 from 8 nations

Medalists
1st place, gold medalist(s)		Samwel Mushai Kimani	Kenya
2nd place, silver medalist(s)		Odair Santos	Brazil
3rd place, bronze medalist(s)		Wilson Bii	Kenya

The Men's 5000 metres T11 event at the 2016 Summer Paralympics took place at the Rio Olympic Stadium on 8 September.

The event was undertaken as a single final for all competitors, using guides. It was the first medal awarded at the 2016 Summer Paralympics, and was won by Kenya's Samwel Mushai Kimani, holding off the host's world champion Odair Santos, who took silver ahead of Kenyan Wilson Bii.

== Results ==
Rank	Athlete	Country	Time	Notes
1st place, gold medalist(s)	Samwel Mushai Kimani; Guide: James Boit	Kenya	15:16.11	PB
2nd place, silver medalist(s)	Odair Santos; Guide: Carlos Santos	Brazil	15:17.55	
3rd place, bronze medalist(s)	Wilson Bii; Guide: Benard Korir	Kenya	15:22.96	PB
4	Hasan Huseyin Kacar; Guide: Muhammet Ugur Cakir	Turkey	15:49.52	PB
5	Zhang Zhen; Guide: Zhang Mingyang	China	15:53.47	
6	Shinya Wada; Guide: Takashi Nakata	Japan	16:02.97	
7	Darwin Castro; Guide: Sebastian Rosero	Ecuador	16:25.38	
8	Nuno Alves; Guide: Ricardo Abreu	Portugal	17:03.64	
9	Erick Kipto Sang; Guide: Bernard Kipkurui Terer	Kenya	DQ	
-	Cristian Valenzuela; Guide: Jonathan Balados	Chile	DNS	-

Q = qualified by place. q = qualified by time. DQ = disqualified RR = Regional Record. PB = Personal Best. SB = Seasonal Best. DNF = Did not finish. DNS = Did not start.
