= Athletics at the 2008 Summer Paralympics – Men's 5000 metres T13 =

The Men's 5,000m T13 had its first round held on September 9, beginning at 9:10 and the Final on September 11 at 9:30.

== Medalists ==
| Gold | Henry Kiprono Kirwa; Kenya |
| Silver | Youssef Benigrahim; Morocco |
| Bronze | Odair Santos; Brazil |

== Results ==
| Place | Athlete | Class | Semifinals | Final |
|---|---|---|---|---|
| 1 | Henry Kiprono Kirwa (KEN) | T12 | 15:45.71 Q | 14:24.02 WR |
| 2 | Youssef Benibrahim (MAR) | T13 | 15:13.41 Q | 14:50.32 PR |
| 3 | Odair Santos (BRA) | T12 | 15:09.90 Q | 14:53.35 |
| 4 | Tim Prendergast (NZL) | T13 | 15:47.26 Q | 15:13.60 |
| 5 | Max Bergmann (GER) | T13 | 15:29.33 q | 15:28.06 |
| 6 | Vedran Lozanov (CRO) | T12 | 16:04.03 q | 15:41.36 |
| 7 | Gustavo Nieves (ESP) | T12 | 15:28.21 Q | DNF |
| 8 | Tarik Zalzouli (MAR) | T13 | 15:48.84 Q | DNF |
| 9 | Elkin Serna (COL) | T12 | 15:53.22 q | DNF |
| 10 | Ali Elahi (IRI) | T12 | 16:03.55 q | DNF |
| 11 | Peter Gottwald Jr (USA) | T13 | 16:11.31 | |
| 12 | Tadashi Horikoshi (JPN) | T12 | 16:27.36 | |
| 13 | Said Gomez (PAN) | T13 | 16:54.95 | |
| 14 | Cesar Lopez (GUA) | T13 | 17:05.32 | |
| | Lazaro Raschid Aguilar (CUB) | T12 | DNF | |
