= Kenya at the 2024 Summer Paralympics =

- IPC code: KEN
- NPC: Kenya National Paralympic Committee

in Paris, France August 28, 2024 – September 8, 2024
- Competitors: 7 in 4 sports
- Flag bearers: Samwel Mushai Kimani; Asiya Sururu
- Medals Ranked 75th: Gold 0 Silver 1 Bronze 0 Total 1

Summer Paralympics appearances (overview)
- 1972; 1976; 1980; 1984; 1988; 1992; 1996; 2000; 2004; 2008; 2012; 2016; 2020; 2024

Kenya competed at the 2024 Summer Paralympics in Paris, France, from 28 August to 8 September.

== Medalists ==
Medal	Name	Sport	Event	Date
Silver	Samson Opiyo	Athletics	Men's long jump F37	3 September

== Competitors ==
The following is the list of number of competitors in the Games.

Sport	Men	Women	Total
Athletics	1	2	3
Cycling	1	0	1
Rowing	0	1	1
Taekwondo	0	2	2
Total	2	5	7

== Athletics ==
Kenyan track and field athletes achieved quota places for the following events based on their results at the 2023 World Championships, 2024 World Championships, or through high performance allocation, as long as they meet the minimum entry standard (MES).

Key

- Note–Ranks given for track events are within the athlete's heat only
- Q = Qualified for the next round
- q = Qualified for the next round as a fastest loser or, in field events, by position without achieving the qualifying target
- DQ = Disqualified
- PR = Paralympic Record
- AR = Area (or continental) Record
- NR = National Record
- SB = Season's Best
- N/A = Round not applicable for the event
- Bye = Athlete not required to compete in round

Track & road events

Athlete	Event	Heat		Final	
Athlete	Event	Result	Rank	Result	Rank
Wesley Kimeli Sang	Men's 1500 metres T46	—		4:07.92	12
Samwel Mushai Kimani	Men's 5000 metres T11	—		DSQ	
John Lokedi	Men's 5000 metres T13	—		16:10.06	6
Priscah Jepkemei	Women's 1500 m T11	5:03.11	3	Did not advance	
Nancy Chelangat Koech	Women's 1500 m T11	4:55.24	1 Q	4:45.10	5
Mary Waithera Njoroge	Women's 1500 m T11	4:50.42	2 q	4:41.48	4

Field Events

Athlete	Event	Final	
Athlete	Event	Distance	Rank
Samson Opiyo	Men's long jump T37	6.20	2nd place, silver medalist(s)
Sheila Wanyoyi	Women's javelin throw F13	28.44	9

== Cycling ==
Kenya entered one male para-cyclist after finished the top eligible nation's at the 2022 UCI Nation's ranking allocation ranking.

=== Road ===
Men

Athlete	Event	Time	Rank
Kennedy Ivuzu Ogada; Pilot: Oscar James Hawke Dennis	Men's road race B	DNF	
Kennedy Ivuzu Ogada; Pilot: Oscar James Hawke Dennis	Men's time trial B	47:06.47	11

== Powerlifting ==
Athlete	Event	Attempts (kg)				Result (kg)	Rank
Athlete	Event	1	2	3	4	Result (kg)	Rank
Wawira Hellen Kariuki	Women's 41 kg	98	99	101	—	101	6

== Rowing ==
Kenya qualified one boats in women's single sculls classes, by winning the 2023 African Continental Qualification Regatta in Tunis, Tunisia.

Athlete	Event	Heats		Repechage		Final	
Athlete	Event	Time	Rank	Time	Rank	Time	Rank
Asiya Mohammed	PR1 women's single sculls	12:08.84	6 R	12:18.29	5 FB	12:34.78	12

Qualification Legend: FA=Final A (medal); FB=Final B (non-medal); R=Repechage

== Taekwondo ==
Kenya entered two athletes to compete at the Paralympics competition. Neema Stency Obonyo and Julieta Lemuge Moipo, qualified for Paris 2024, following the triumph of their gold medal results in their respective classes, through the 2024 African Qualification Tournament in Dakar, Senegal.

Athlete	Event	First round	Quarterfinals	Semifinals	Repechage 1	Repechage 2	Final / BM	
Athlete	Event	Opposition Result	Opposition Result	Opposition Result	Opposition Result	Opposition Result	Opposition Result	Rank
Neema Stency Obonyo	Women's –52 kg	Hassan (EGY); L 3–12	Did not advance					
Julieta Lemuge Moipo	Women's –57 kg	Mičev (SRB); L 4-19	Did not advance					

== See also ==
- Kenya at the 2024 Summer Olympics
- Kenya at the Paralympics
