= Athletics at the 2008 Summer Paralympics – Men's 5000 metres T11 =

The Men's 5,000m T11 had its Final held on September 9 at 19:20.

== Medalists ==
Gold	Zhen Zhang; China
Silver	Francis Thuo Karanja; Kenya
Bronze	Henry Wanyoike; Kenya

== Results ==
Place	Athlete	Final
1	Zhen Zhang (CHN)	15:27.35
2	Francis Thuo Karanja (KEN)	15:32.28
3	Henry Wanyoike (KEN)	15:47.17
4	Constantino Angeles (MEX)	16:31.88
5	Ricardo Vale (POR)	16:32.49
6	Christiano Farias (BRA)	16:38.15
	Nuno Alves (POR)	DNF
	Carlos Barto Silva (BRA)	DNF
	Luis Zapien (MEX)	DSQ
