= Kenya at the 1992 Summer Paralympics =

- IPC code: KEN
- NPC: Kenya National Paralympic Committee

in Barcelona,Madrid
- Competitors: 15
- Medals Ranked 35th: Gold 3 Silver 1 Bronze 3 Total 7

Summer Paralympics appearances (overview)
- 1972; 1976; 1980; 1984; 1988; 1992; 1996; 2000; 2004; 2008; 2012; 2016; 2020; 2024

Kenya competed at the 1992 Summer Paralympics in Barcelona, Spain. 15 competitors from Kenya won 2 medals, 1 gold and 1 bronze to finish 41st in the medal table. 13-year-old Mary Nakhumica made her Paralympic debut, winning Kenya's only gold in the women's javelin throw THW7 event.

In Madrid paralympics games Kenya has 2 gold, 1 silver, 2 bronze and total 5 medals is from best all from participated best medal table results in Paralympics games

== Team ==
Kenya had a 15-member strong delegation, composed of 9 men and 6 women. The team included Vincent Kimanzi, Antoney Mutuku, Barack Ochieng, Stephen Maneno, Samson Mosoti, Helen Bohe, and Mary Nakhumica.

== Medalists ==
Kenya won 2 medals, 1 gold and 1 bronze to finish 41st in the medal table. Mary Nakhumicha won gold and Rose Atieno Olang won a bronze medal for Kenya in the women's javelin throw THW7 event. This was the first time that Kenya had won medals in the same event.

In the Madrid games Kenya has 2 gold, 1 silver, 2 bronze had medals

Medal	Name	Sport	Event
Gold	Mary Nakhumicha	Athletics	Women's javelin throw THW7
Bronze	Rose Atieno Olang	Athletics	Women's javelin throw THW7

== Athletics ==
The athletics team included Mary Nakhumica, Vincent Kimanzi, Antoney Mutuku, Barack Ochieng, Stephen Maneno and Helen Bohe.

As a 13-year-old, Nakhumica made her Paralympic debut in Barcelona. She claimed Kenya's only gold medal at these Games after winning the women's javelin throw THW7 event. Ochieng finished ninth in the Men's Discus B2 event, with a best throw of 28.24 m. This was well behind the gold medal world record breaking throw of Unified Team Sergei Khodakov, who threw 40.82. He also competed in the Men's Shot Put B2, finishing ninth and last with a best throw of 8.53m. Maneno finished fifteenth in the Men's Discus THW7 event, while Mosoti finished nineteenth in the same event. Maneno had a best distance of 24.96m to Mosoti's 22.64m. Mosoti also competed in the Men's Javelin THW7, finishing eleventh on a throw of 27.04m. Maneno finished eighteenth in that event with best throw of 20.62m.

Kimanzi competed in the Men's 200 m TS4 event. Competing in heat 1, he posted a time of 25.46 to finish last in his heat. Mutuku was disqualified from heat 6 of the Men's 800 m TW2 event. Bohe competed in the Women's Discus B1. She finished sixth in the six deep field, with a best throw of 15.94m.

== See also ==
- Kenya at the Paralympics
- Kenya at the 1992 Summer Olympics
