= Athletics at the 2004 Summer Paralympics – Women's 1500 metres T12 =

Women's 1,500m T12 at the XII Paralympic Games
- Venue: Athens Olympic Stadium
- Dates: 27 September 2004
- Competitors: 8 from 6 nations
- Winning time: 4:36.29

Medalists
1st place, gold medalist(s)		Elena Pautova	Russia
2nd place, silver medalist(s)		Julia Longorkaye	Kenya
3rd place, bronze medalist(s)		Rima Batalova	Russia

The Women's 1500m races for class T12 visually impaired athletes at the 2004 Summer Paralympics were held in the Athens Olympic Stadium on 27 September. Events were held in three disability classes. The event consisted of a single race, and was won by Elena Pautova, representing Russia.

== Final round ==
27 Sept. 2004, 20:25

Rank	Athlete	Time	Notes
1st place, gold medalist(s)	Elena Pautova (RUS)	4:36.29	WR
2nd place, silver medalist(s)	Julia Longorkaye (KEN)	4:41.71	
3rd place, bronze medalist(s)	Rima Batalova (RUS)	4:42.61	
4	Pamela McGonigle (USA)	4:56.28	
5	Odete Fiuza (POR)	4:58.63	
6	Victoria Tchernova (RUS)	5:13.71	
7	Terezinha Guilhermina (BRA)	5:17.25	
8	Maria Burgos (VEN)	5:32.39	
