= Athletics at the 2008 Summer Paralympics – Men's 1500 metres T46 =

The Men's 1,500m T46 had its First Round held on September 9 at 9:55 and the Final on September 10 at 18:46.

== Medalists ==
Gold	Abraham Cheruiyot Tarbei; Kenya
Silver	Abderrahman Ait Khamouch; Spain
Bronze	Samir Nouioua; Algeria

== Results ==
Place	Athlete	Round 1	Final
1	Abraham Cheruiyot Tarbei (KEN)	4:07.59 Q	3:52.50 WR
2	Abderrahman Ait Khamouch (ESP)	4:08.67 Q	3:53.46
3	Samir Nouioua (ALG)	4:07.52 Q	3:53.63
4	Marcin Awizen (POL)	4:09.57 Q	3:54.24
5	Tesfalem Gebru Kebede (ETH)	4:08.47 Q	3:55.41
6	Stephen Wambua Musyoki (KEN)	4:10.53 q	3:57.21
7	Ning Qin (CHN)	4:08.18 Q	3:58.23
8	Michael Roeger (AUS)	4:09.62 Q	3:59.21
9	Said Toumi (MAR)	4:09.96 q	4:08.29
10	Ferej Mohammed Hibu (ETH)	4:11.22 q	4:16.74
11	Oleh Leshchyshyn (UKR)	4:11.35 q	4:17.96
12	Mohamed Fouzai (TUN)	4:09.95 Q	4:41.87
13	Mohamed Aissaoui (ALG)	4:11.53	
14	Abdenour Rechidi (ALG)	4:11.56	
15	Driss Ouguerd (MAR)	4:11.58	
16	Christoph Sommer (SUI)	4:12.45	
17	Wojciech Golaski (POL)	4:13.83	
18	Jose Monteiro (POR)	4:13.98	
19	Jose Carlos Alecrim (BRA)	4:15.54	
20	Fidele Manirambona (BDI)	4:16.54	
21	Leonidas Ahishakiye (BDI)	4:16.78	
22	Naohiro Ninomiya (JPN)	4:16.79	
23	Ernesto Blanco (CUB)	4:20.77	
