= Athletics at the 2012 Summer Paralympics – Men's 1500 metres T11 =

Men's 1500 metres T11 at the XIV Paralympic Games
- Venue: London Olympic Stadium
- Dates: 31 August to 3 September
- Competitors: 14 from 11 nations
- Winning time: 3:58.37

Medalists
1st place, gold medalist(s)		Samwel Mushai Kimani; James Boit	Kenya
2nd place, silver medalist(s)		Odair Santos; Carlos Antonio dos Santos	Brazil
3rd place, bronze medalist(s)		Jason Joseph Dunkerley; Josh Karanja	Canada

Athletics at the 2012 Summer Paralympics
Classification
T/F11–13: Blind and visually impaired
T/F20: Intellectual disability
T/F31–38: Cerebral palsy
F40: Les Autres
T/F42–46: Amputees
T/F51–58: Spinal cord disability
Men T/F11–13
Track
100 m	T11	T12	T13
200 m	T11	T12	T13
400 m	T11	T12	T13
800 m		T12	T13
1500 m	T11		T13
5000 m	T11	T12
4×100 m relay	T11–13
Road
Marathon		T12
Field
Long jump	F11		F13
Triple jump	F11	F12
Shot put	F11–12
Discus throw	F11
Javelin throw		F12–13
Women T/F11–13
Track
100 m	T11	T12	T13
200 m	T11	T12
400 m		T12	T13
1500 m		T12
Field
Long jump	F11–12		F13
Shot put	F11–12
Discus throw	F11–12
Javelin throw		F12–13

The Men's 1500 metres T11 event at the 2012 Summer Paralympics took place at the London Olympic Stadium from 31 August to 3 September.

The T11 category is for athletes with a visual impairment. A T11 athlete may be entirely without sight, or be able to perceive light, but have no ability to see the shape of a hand at any distance. T11 athletes commonly run with guides.

== Records ==
Prior to the competition, the existing World and Paralympic records were as follows:

World record	Odair Santos (BRA)	4:04.32	7 August 2011	São Paulo, Brazil
Paralympic record	José Antonio Sánchez (ESP)	4:01.19	August 1996	Atlanta, United States
Broken records during the 2012 Summer Paralympics
World record	Samwel Mushai Kimani (KEN)	3:58.37	3 September 2012	

== Results ==
=== Round 1 ===
Competed 31 August 2012 from 11:13. Qual. rule: winner of each heat (Q) plus the two fastest other times (q) qualified.

==== Heat 1 ====
Rank	Athlete	Country	Time	Notes
1	Samwel Mushai Kimani; Guide: James Boit	Kenya	4:09.44	Q, PB
2	Jason Joseph Dunkerley; Guide: Josh Karanja	Canada	4:13.67	Q
3	William Sosa; Guide: Cesar Chavarro Dias	Colombia	4:15.66	q, PB
4	Carlos J Barto Silva; Guide: Cassio Henrique Damiao	Brazil	4:25.36	SB
5	Albert Asadullin; Guide: Vladislav Timerbaev	Russia	4:25.98	PB
6	Nuno Alves; Guide: Jose Ferreira	Portugal	DNF	
7	Mohamed Ed Dahmani; Guide: Mustapha Sanjach	Morocco	DQ	

==== Heat 2 ====
Rank	Athlete	Country	Time	Notes
1	Odair Santos; Guide: Carlos Antonio dos Santos	Brazil	4:14.95	Q
2	Cristian Valenzuela; Guide: Cristopher Guajardo	Chile	4:15.54	Q, PB
3	Mikael Andersen; Guide: Laust Bengtsen	Denmark	4:17.44	q, SB
4	Shinya Wada	Japan	4:18.71	PB
5	Luis Zapien Rosas; Guide: Juan Carlos Mariscal Rivera	Mexico	4:24.52	PB
6	Ricardo Vale; Guide: Paulo Ramos	Portugal	4:31.77	
7	Immanuel Kipkosgei Cheruiyot; Guide: Robert Tarus	Kenya	DQ	

=== Final ===
Competed 3 September 2012 at 20:31.

Rank	Athlete	Country	Time	Notes
1st place, gold medalist(s)	Samwel Mushai Kimani; Guide: James Boit	Kenya	3:58.37	WR
2nd place, silver medalist(s)	Odair Santos; Guide: Carlos Antonio dos Santos	Brazil	4:03.66	RR
3rd place, bronze medalist(s)	Jason Joseph Dunkerley; Guide: Josh Karanja	Canada	4:07.56	PB
4	Cristian Valenzuela; Guide: Cristopher Guajardo	Chile	4:07.79	PB
5	William Sosa; Guide: Cesar Chavarro Dias	Colombia	4:13.53	PB
6	Mikael Andersen; Guide: Laust Bengtsen	Denmark	4:16.12	SB

Q = qualified by place. q = qualified by time. WR = World Record. RR = Regional Record. PB = Personal Best. SB = Seasonal Best. DNF = Did not finish.
