= Kenya at the 1996 Summer Paralympics =

- IPC code: KEN
- NPC: Kenya National Paralympic Committee

in Atlanta
- Competitors: 17 (11 men and 6 women)
- Medals: Gold 1 Silver 1 Bronze 0 Total 2

Summer Paralympics appearances (overview)
- 1972; 1976; 1980; 1984; 1988; 1992; 1996; 2000; 2004; 2008; 2012; 2016; 2020; 2024

Kenya competed at the 1996 Summer Paralympics. The country sent a 17 strong athlete delegation to Atlanta, United States.

== Team ==
17 athletes, 11 men and 6 women, represented Kenya at the Games in Atlanta, United States. This was the largest delegation that Kenya has ever sent to a Paralympic Games. The team included Mary Nakhumica, who was making her second Paralympic Games appearance as a 17-year-old.

== Background ==
In many parts of Black Africa, people who have disabilities that include intellectual disabilities, and physical disabilities such as impairments and deformities often face cultural barriers to participation because of attitudes related to their disabilities. These include beliefs that they acquired their disabilities because their parents were witches or they are wizards. Their disability is often seen as a result of a personal failing on their part. As such, there is often tremendous cultural pressure for people with physical disabilities to remain hidden and out of the public eye. In many places, they are perceived to be monsters in need of healing. In a Kenyan context, the "bad blood" of people with disabilities is thought to also impact their families, creating further stigma for the person with the disability.

== Medals ==
Kenyan Paralympians won two medals at these games, one gold and one silver. The team included Mary Nakhumica. Mary Nakhumicha was back from Barcelona for the Atlanta Games. Building on her success at the previous Games, she won silver in the women's javelin throw.

| Medal | Name | Sport | Event |
|---|---|---|---|
| Gold | Christopher Moori | Athletics | Men's javelin F41 |
| Silver | Mary Nakhumicha | Athletics | Women's javelin F55-57 |

== See also ==
- Kenya at the Paralympics
- Kenya at the 1996 Summer Olympics
