= Athletics at the 1992 Summer Paralympics – Men's discus throw B2 =

Men's discus throw B2 at the IX Paralympic Games
- Paralympic Athletics
- Venue: Estadi Olímpic de Montjuïc
- Dates: September 1992
- Competitors: 11 from 11 nations

Medalists
| 1st place, gold medalist(s) | | Sergei Khodakov | Independent Paralympic Participants |
| 2nd place, silver medalist(s) | | Gueorgui Sakelarov | Bulgaria |
| 3rd place, bronze medalist(s) | | Yolmer Urdaneta | Venezuela |

The Men's discus throw B2 was a field event in athletics at the 1992 Summer Paralympics, for visually impaired athletes.

== Results ==
=== Final ===
| Place | Athlete | Width |
|---|---|---|
| 1 | Sergei Khodakov (IPP) | 40.82 |
| 2 | Gueorgui Sakelarov (BUL) | 40.50 |
| 3 | Yolmer Urdaneta (VEN) | 40.10 |
| 4 | Raimo Heikkinen (FIN) | 39.36 |
| 5 | Siegmund Hegeholz (GER) | 37.12 |
| 6 | Mark Davies (AUS) | 37.10 |
| 7 | Jaan Jensen (EST) | 36.54 |
| 8 | Andrzej Godlewski (POL) | 33.98 |
| 9 | Barack Ochieng (KEN) | 28.24 |
| 10 | Pedro Alvarado (PUR) | 24.80 |
| - | Karl Mayr (AUT) | DNS |
