= Kenya at the 2020 Summer Paralympics =

- IPC code: KEN
- NPC: Kenya National Paralympic Committee

in Tokyo
- Competitors: 9 in 3 sports
- Medals: Gold 0 Silver 0 Bronze 1 Total 1

Summer Paralympics appearances (overview)
- 1972; 1976; 1980; 1984; 1988; 1992; 1996; 2000; 2004; 2008; 2012; 2016; 2020; 2024

Kenya competed at the 2020 Summer Paralympics in Tokyo, Japan, from 24 August to 5 September 2021.

== Medalists ==
Medal	Name	Sport	Event	Date
Bronze	Nancy Chelangat Koech	Athletics	Women's 1500 metres T11	30 August

== Competitors ==
Sport	Men	Women	Total
Athletics	4	3	7
Powerlifting	0	1	1
Rowing	0	1	1
Total	4	5	9

== Athletics ==
Two Kenyan athlete Samwel Kimani (Men's 1500m & 5000m T11) & Nancy Chelangat Koech (Women's 1500m T11) successfully to break through the qualifications for the 2020 Paralympics after breaking the qualification limit.

== Rowing ==
Kenya qualified one boats in the women's single sculls events for the games by winning the gold medal at the 2019 FISA African Qualification Regatta in Tunis, Tunisia.

Athlete	Event	Heats		Repechage		Final	
Athlete	Event	Time	Rank	Time	Rank	Time	Rank
Asiya Sururu	Women's single sculls	13:45.50	4	13:14.26	5	14:27.48	12

Qualification Legend: FA=Final A (medal); FB=Final B (non-medal); R=Repechage

== See also ==
- Kenya at the Paralympics
- Kenya at the 2020 Summer Olympics
