= Athletics at the 2008 Summer Paralympics – Men's 1500 metres T11 =

The Men's 1,500m T11 had its first round held on September 13, beginning at 11:40 and the Final on September 15, at 18:39.

== Medalists ==
| Gold | Zhen Zhang; China |
| Silver | Samwel Mushai Kimani; Kenya |
| Bronze | Jason Dunkerley; Canada |

== Results ==
| Place | Athlete | Round 1 | Final |
|---|---|---|---|
| 1 | Zhen Zhang (CHN) | 4:14.85 Q | 4:10.05 |
| 2 | Samwel Mushai Kimani (KEN) | 4:18.66 Q | 4:11.76 |
| 3 | Jason Dunkerley (CAN) | 4:15.65 Q | 4:12.53 |
| 4 | Mikael Andersen (DEN) | 4:15.69 q | 4:13.90 |
| 5 | Carlos Barto Silva (BRA) | 4:16.29 q | 4:14.80 |
| 6 | Gerrard Gosens (AUS) | 4:21.00 q | 4:24.65 |
| 7 | Christiano Farias (BRA) | 4:21.32 | |
| 8 | Nuno Alves (POR) | 4:21.41 | |
| 9 | Artem Tayganov (RUS) | 4:24.41 | |
| 10 | Francis Thuo Karanja (KEN) | 4:25.33 | |
| 11 | Cristian Valenzuela (CHI) | 4:27.94 | |
| 12 | Constantino Angeles (MEX) | 4:30.50 | |
| 13 | Nicolas Ledesma (MEX) | 4:31.08 | |
| 14 | Petar Beslic (CRO) | 4:31.52 | |
