= Athletics at the 2012 Summer Paralympics – Women's 400 metres T13 =

Women's 400 metres T13 at the XIV Paralympic Games
- Venue: London Olympic Stadium
- Dates: 3 September
- Competitors: 9 from 8 nations
- Winning time: 55.12

Medalists
1st place, gold medalist(s)		Omara Durand	Cuba
2nd place, silver medalist(s)		Somaya Bousaid	Tunisia
3rd place, bronze medalist(s)		Alexandra Dimoglou	Greece

Athletics at the 2012 Summer Paralympics
Classification
T/F11–13: Blind and visually impaired
T/F20: Intellectual disability
T/F31–38: Cerebral palsy
F40: Les Autres
T/F42–46: Amputees
T/F51–58: Spinal cord disability
Men T/F11–13
Track
100 m	T11	T12	T13
200 m	T11	T12	T13
400 m	T11	T12	T13
800 m		T12	T13
1500 m	T11		T13
5000 m	T11	T12
4×100 m relay	T11–13
Road
Marathon		T12
Field
Long jump	F11		F13
Triple jump	F11	F12
Shot put	F11–12
Discus throw	F11
Javelin throw		F12–13
Women T/F11–13
Track
100 m	T11	T12	T13
200 m	T11	T12
400 m		T12	T13
1500 m		T12
Field
Long jump	F11–12		F13
Shot put	F11–12
Discus throw	F11–12
Javelin throw		F12–13

The Women's 400 metres T13 event at the 2012 Summer Paralympics took place at the London Olympic Stadium on 3 September. The event consisted of a single race.

The T13 category is for athletes with a moderate visual impairment. Athletes in this category have a variety of visual impairments, but can typically recognize contours from a distance of 2 to 6 metres. Athletes in this category do not typically require a guide.

== Records ==
Prior to the competition, the existing World and Paralympic records were as follows:

World record	Marla Runyan (USA)	54.46	3 January 1995	Los Angeles, United States
Paralympic record	Sanae Benhama (MAR)	55.56	12 September 2008	Beijing, China
Broken records during the 2012 Summer Paralympics
Paralympic record	Omara Durand (CUB)	55.12	3 September 2012	

== Results ==
Competed 3 September 2012 at 19:00.

Rank	Athlete	Country	Time	Notes
1st place, gold medalist(s)	Omara Durand	Cuba	55.12	PR
2nd place, silver medalist(s)	Somaya Bousaid	Tunisia	56.83	SB
3rd place, bronze medalist(s)	Alexandra Dimoglou	Greece	56.91	PB
4	Nantenin Keita	France	57.64	SB
5	Olena Gliebova	Ukraine	58.44	PB
6	Anna Duzikowska	Poland	1:03.33	PB
7	Viviane Soares	Brazil	1:05.96	PB
	Joana Helena Silva	Brazil	DNF	
	Christine Akullo	Uganda	DNS	

Q = qualified by place. q = qualified by time. PR = Paralympic Record. PB = Personal Best. SB = Seasonal Best. DNF = Did not finish. DNS = Did not start.
