= Jeny Velazco =

Mexican Paralympic athlete

Medal record

Track and field (F57/58)

Representing Mexico

Paralympic Games
Bronze medal – third place	2008 Beijing	Javelin throw F57/58

Parapan American Games
Gold medal – first place	2007 Rio de Janeiro	Javelin throw F54/55/56/57/58
Gold medal – first place	2011 Guadalajara	Javelin throw F54-58
Bronze medal – third place	2015 Toronto	Javelin throw F57

Jeny Velazco Reyes is a Paralympian athlete from Mexico competing mainly in category F57/58 javelin events.

She competed in the 2008 Summer Paralympics in Beijing, China. There, she won a bronze medal in the women's Javelin throw F57/F58 event.
