= Kenya at the 1988 Summer Paralympics =

- IPC code: KEN
- NPC: Kenya National Paralympic Committee

in Seoul
- Competitors: 12
- Medals Ranked 41st: Gold 0 Silver 4 Bronze 1 Total 5

Summer Paralympics appearances (overview)
- 1972; 1976; 1980; 1984; 1988; 1992; 1996; 2000; 2004; 2008; 2012; 2016; 2020; 2024

Kenya competed at the 1988 Summer Paralympics in Seoul, South Korea.

== Team ==
Kenya made their fourth Paralympic Games appearance in Seoul, South Korea. They fielded a team of twelve sportspeople, including eight men and four women.

== Medalists ==
12 competitors from Kenya won 5 medals including 4 silver and 1 bronze and finished 41st in the medal table.

Medal	Name	Sport	Event
Silver	Samson Mosoti	Athletics	Men's javelin throw 5
Silver	Grace Muteti	Athletics	Women's javelin throw 2
Silver	Lucy Wanjiru Njorogg	Athletics	Women's javelin throw 3
Silver	Patricia Kihungi	Lawn bowls	Women's singles 2-6
Bronze	Lucy Wanjiru Njorogg	Athletics	Women's shot put 3

== See also ==
- Kenya at the Paralympics
- Kenya at the 1988 Summer Olympics
