= Kenya at the 1972 Summer Paralympics =

- IPC code: KEN
- NPC: Kenya National Paralympic Committee

in Heidelberg
- Competitors: 4 in 4 sports
- Medals Ranked 25th: Gold 1 Silver 0 Bronze 0 Total 1

Summer Paralympics appearances (overview)
- 1972; 1976; 1980; 1984; 1988; 1992; 1996; 2000; 2004; 2008; 2012; 2016; 2020; 2024

Kenya made its Paralympic Games début at the 1972 Summer Paralympics in Heidelberg, Germany. The country sent four representatives (all men) to compete in archery, athletics, snooker and swimming. 1968 Great Britain Paralympic medalist John Britton who had migrated to Kenya and was representing the country at the 1972 Games won the country's first Paralympic medal, a gold in the men's 25 meter freestyle class 2 event in a world record time of 19.9 seconds.

== Team ==
Kenya made their Paralympic Games debut in Heidelberg, Germany. They fielded a team of four men, the only time in their history that they sent only men to the Paralympic Games. The team included archery, athletics and snooker competitor Zulfikarali Salehmohamed Dhanji, athletics competitors Kamau and Maurice Kamia, and swimmer John Britton.

== Medallists ==
Kenya won a single medal - a gold in swimming won by John Britton. Britton had previously represented Great Britain at the 1968 Summer Paralympics where he had won several medals, but had immigrated to Kenya after those Games. He also served as the Kenyan coach in Heidelberg. In this period, he worked to establish a 40-bed hospital in the country for paraplegics as a result of an agreement between the British and Kenyan governments. Following the 1972 Games, Britton moved to the United States to take up a teaching position at Northern Illinois University. He continued to live in the United States until his death in 2004 in Florida.

Of the thirty-six medals Kenya had won as of 2010 at the Paralympic Games, this was not only the first but also the only one not to be won in athletics.

Medal	Name	Sport	Event	Result
Gold	John Britton	Swimming	Men's 25 metre freestyle 2	19.9s (world record)

== Archery ==
Zulfikarali Salehmohamed Dhanji competed in three sports in Germany, including archery. He was involved in one event, the Men's St. Nicholas Round Tetraplegic, where he did not medal.

Athlete	Event	Place	Ref
Zulfikarali Salehmohamed Dhanji	Men's St. Nicholas Round Tetraplegic	Did not medal	

== Athletics ==
Kenya had three athletes competing in athletics: or Zulfikarali Salehmohamed Dhanji, Kamau and Maurice Kamia. All three competed in field events, the discus, javelin and shot put. Dhanji was in the 1B class, while Kamau was in the 2 class and Kamia was in the 4 class.

Athlete	Event	Place	Ref
Zulfikarali Salehmohamed Dhanji	Men's Discus Throw 1B	Did not medal	
Zulfikarali Salehmohamed Dhanji	Men's Javelin 1B	Did not medal	
Zulfikarali Salehmohamed Dhanji	Men's Shot Put 1B	Did not medal	
Kamau	Men's Discus Throw 2	Did not medal	
Kamau	Men's Javelin 2	Did not medal	
Kamau	Men's Shot Put 2	Did not medal	
Maurice Kamia	Men's Discus Throw 4	Did not medal	
Maurice Kamia	Men's Javelin 4	Did not medal	
Maurice Kamia	Men's Shot Put 4	Did not medal	

== Snooker ==
Dhanji competed in the men's tetraplegic snooker tournament, where he did not medal.

Athlete	Event	Place	Ref
Zulfikarali Salehmohamed Dhanji	Men's Tournament Tetraplegic	Did not medal	

== Swimming ==
John Britton won Kenya's first Paralympic gold medal after winning the men's 25 meter freestyle class 2 event in a world record time of 19.9 seconds.

Name	Sport	Event	Result	Place	Ref
John Britton	Swimming	Men's 25 metre freestyle 2	19.9s (world record)	Gold	
