= Qing Suping =

Chinese Paralympic athlete

Medal record

Paralympic athletics

Representing China

Paralympic Games
Gold medal – first place	2008 Beijing	Javelin Throw - F57-58

Qing Suping is a Paralympian athlete from China competing mainly in category F57-58 javelin throw events.

She competed in the 2008 Summer Paralympics in Beijing, China. There she won a gold medal in the women's F57-58 javelin throw event.
