= Athletics at the 2008 Summer Paralympics – Women's javelin throw F57–58 =

Women's Javelin F57/58 at the XIII Paralympic Games
- Venue: Beijing National Stadium
- Dates: 11 September
- Competitors: 12 from 12 nations
- Winning distance: 22.71

Medalists
1st place, gold medalist(s)		Qing Suping	China
2nd place, silver medalist(s)		Nakhumicha Zakayo	Kenya
3rd place, bronze medalist(s)		Jeny Velazco	Mexico

The women's javelin F57/58 event at the 2008 Summer Paralympics took place at the Beijing National Stadium at 09:00 on 11 September. There was a single round of competition; after the first three throws, only the top eight had 3 further throws. The competition was won by Qing Suping, representing China.

== Results ==
Rank	Athlete	Nationality	Cl.	1	2	3	4	5	6	Best	Pts.	Notes
1st place, gold medalist(s)	Qing Suping	China	F57	x	20.63	21.90	21.66	21.37	22.71	22.71	1140	
2nd place, silver medalist(s)	Nakhumicha Zakayo	Kenya	F57	21.65	22.03	22.14	21.21	22.64	21.90	22.64	1137	
3rd place, bronze medalist(s)	Jeny Velazco	Mexico	F58	29.43	27.71	27.42	26.84	29.55	30.57	30.57	1037	SB
4	Olga Sergienko	Russia	F57	x	20.55	19.75	x	19.80	20.25	20.55	1032	SB
5	Safia Djelal	Algeria	F58	29.89	x	28.95	29.25	x	x	29.89	1014	SB
6	Eucharia Njideka Iyiazi	Nigeria	F58	x	25.18	24.39	25.31	24.39	26.11	26.11	885	SB
7	Thi Hai Nguyen	Vietnam	F58	24.25	25.01	x	24.17	25.60	x	25.60	868	
8	Ivanka Koleva	Bulgaria	F57	16.11	16.72	16.03	15.03	15.82	15.38	16.72	839	
9	Sylvia Grant	Jamaica	F57	16.05	x	15.76	-	-	-	16.05	806	
10	Moline Muza	Zimbabwe	F58	20.10	19.29	23.09	-	-	-	23.09	783	
11	Malda Baumgarte	Lithuania	F58	x	x	20.72	-	-	-	20.72	703	SB
12	Kuong Sio Ieng	Macau	F57	11.21	12.78	11.08	-	-	-	12.78	642	

SB = Seasonal Best.
