= Kenya at the 1980 Summer Paralympics =

- IPC code: KEN
- NPC: Kenya National Paralympic Committee

in Arnhem
- Competitors: 17
- Medals Ranked 30th: Gold 1 Silver 2 Bronze 0 Total 3

Summer Paralympics appearances (overview)
- 1972; 1976; 1980; 1984; 1988; 1992; 1996; 2000; 2004; 2008; 2012; 2016; 2020; 2024

Kenya competed at the 1980 Summer Paralympics in Arnhem, Netherlands. The seventeen member team competed in athletics, weightlifting, lawn bowls and table tennis, claiming a gold medal and two silver medals. Lucy Wanjiru 's gold in the Women's Javelin 3 event was the first gold earned by a Kenyan woman at the Paralympic Games.

== Team ==
Kenya made their second Paralympic Games appearance in Arnhem, Netherlands. They were returning to the Games, having boycotted the 1976 Summer Paralympics as a result of a broader boycott by the Kenyan Olympic Committee for the 1976 Summer Olympics. The team was seventeen strong, and included thirteen men and four women. They competed in athletics, weightlifting, lawn bowls and table tennis.

== Medals ==
17 competitors from Kenya won 3 medals, 1 gold and 2 silver, and finished 30th in the medal table. Lucy Wanjiru won the first gold medal by a Kenyan woman after winning the Women's Javelin 3 event.

Medal	Name	Sport	Event
Gold	Lucy Wanjiru	Athletics	Women's javelin throw 3
Silver	Japheth Musyoki	Athletics	Men's discus throw 3
Silver	Japheth Musyoki	Athletics	Men's shot put 3

== Athletics ==
Sixteen of the country's seventeen Paralympians competed in athletics in Germany. It was the only sport where Kenya medaled at these Games. Japheth Musyoki won a pair of silver medals for Kenya, one Men's Discus Throw 3 and another in the Men's Shot Put 3. Lucy Wanjiru won the first gold medal by a Kenyan woman after winning the Women's Javelin 3 event.

Athlete		Event	Medal	Ref
Godfrey Ithongo	Athletics	Men's Discus Throw 2	-	
Godfrey Ithongo	Athletics	Men's Javelin 2	-	
Godfrey Ithongo	Athletics	Men's Shot Put 2	-	
Ruth Kagonya	Athletics	Women's 200 m 3		
Ruth Kagonya	Athletics	Women's 400 m 3		
Ruth Kagonya	Athletics	Women's 60 m 3		
Ruth Kagonya	Athletics	Women's Discus Throw 3		
Ruth Kagonya	Athletics	Women's Javelin 3		
Ruth Kagonya	Athletics	Women's Shot Put 3		
Ruth Kagonya	Athletics	Women's Slalom 3		
Maurice Kamia	Athletics	Men's Discus Throw 3	-	
Maurice Kamia	Athletics	Men's Javelin 3	-	
Maurice Kamia	Athletics	Men's Shot Put 3	-	
S. Kariuki	Athletics	Men's 100 m 2	-	
S. Kariuki	Athletics	Men's 200 m 2	-	
S. Kariuki	Athletics	Men's 400 m 2	-	
Christopher Kipkemboi	Athletics	Men's 100 m 4	-	
Christopher Kipkemboi	Athletics	Men's 800 m 4	-	
Christopher Kipkemboi	Athletics	Men's 1500 m 4	-	
Christopher Kipkemboi	Athletics	Men's Discus Throw 4	-	
Christopher Kipkemboi	Athletics	Men's Javelin 4	-	
Christopher Kipkemboi	Athletics	Men's Shot Put 4	-	
Christopher Kipkemboi	Athletics	Men's Slalom 4	-	
Jason Sichhangi	Athletics	Men's 100 m 4		
Jason Sichhangi	Athletics	Men's Discus Throw 4		
Jason Sichhangi	Athletics	Men's Javelin 4		
Jason Sichhangi	Athletics	Men's Shot Put 4		
Jason Sichhangi	Athletics	Men's Slalom 4		
Francis Kyania	Athletics	Men's 100 m 2	-	
Francis Kyania	Athletics	Men's 200 m 2	-	
Francis Kyania	Athletics	Men's 400 m 2	-	
Francis Kyania	Athletics	Men's Javelin 2	-	
Francis Kyania	Athletics	Men's Shot Put 2	-	
Francis Kyania	Athletics	Men's Slalom 2	-	
Philomena Lugale	Athletics	Women's 200 m 3	-	
Philomena Lugale	Athletics	Women's 400 m 3	-	
Philomena Lugale	Athletics	Women's 60 m 3	-	
Philomena Lugale	Athletics	Women's Discus Throw 3	-	
Philomena Lugale	Athletics	Women's Javelin 3	-	
Philomena Lugale	Athletics	Women's Shot Put 3	-	
Philomena Lugale	Athletics	Women's Slalom 3	-	
Aggrey Makaya	Athletics	Men's 100 m 3	-	
Aggrey Makaya	Athletics	Men's 200 m 3	-	
Aggrey Makaya	Athletics	Men's 400 m 3	-	
Aggrey Makaya	Athletics	Men's Discus Throw 3	-	
Aggrey Makaya	Athletics	Men's Javelin 3	-	
Aggrey Makaya	Athletics	Men's Shot Put 3	-	
Aggrey Makaya	Athletics	Men's Slalom 3	-	
Japheth Musyoki	Athletics	Men's 100 m 3	-	
Japheth Musyoki	Athletics	Men's Discus Throw 3	Silver	
Japheth Musyoki	Athletics	Men's Javelin 3	-	
Japheth Musyoki	Athletics	Men's Shot Put 3		
Japheth Musyoki	Athletics	Men's Slalom 3	-	
Faith W. Mwaniki	Athletics	Women's 200 m 2	-	
Faith W. Mwaniki	Athletics	Women's 400 m 2	-	
Faith W. Mwaniki	Athletics	Women's 60 m 2	-	
Faith W. Mwaniki	Athletics	Women's Discus Throw 2	-	
Faith W. Mwaniki	Athletics	Women's Javelin 2	-	
Faith W. Mwaniki	Athletics	Women's Shot Put 2	-	
Faith W. Mwaniki	Athletics	Women's Slalom 2	-	
Timothy Ngumba	Athletics	Men's 60 m 1B	-	
Timothy Ngumba	Athletics	Men's Club Throw 1B	-	
Timothy Ngumba	Athletics	Men's Discus Throw 1B	-	
Timothy Ngumba	Athletics	Men's Shot Put 1B	-	
Timothy Ngumba	Athletics	Men's Slalom 1B	-	
Oaga Nyamoti	Athletics	Men's 100 m 5	-	
Oaga Nyamoti	Athletics	Men's 800 m 5	-	
Oaga Nyamoti	Athletics	Men's 1500 m 5	-	
Oaga Nyamoti	Athletics	Men's Discus Throw 5	-	
Oaga Nyamoti	Athletics	Men's Javelin 5	-	
Oaga Nyamoti	Athletics	Men's Shot Put 5	-	
Oaga Nyamoti	Athletics	Men's Slalom 5	-	
George Opiyo	Athletics	Men's 100 m 5	-	
George Opiyo	Athletics	Men's 800 m 5	-	
George Opiyo	Athletics	Men's 1500 m 5	-	
George Opiyo	Athletics	Men's Discus Throw 5	-	
George Opiyo	Athletics	Men's Javelin 5	-	
George Opiyo	Athletics	Men's Shot Put 5	-	
George Opiyo	Athletics	Men's Slalom 5	-	
B. Owabucheli	Athletics	Men's 60 m 1A	-	
B. Owabucheli	Athletics	Men's Club Throw 1A	-	
B. Owabucheli	Athletics	Men's Discus Throw 1A	-	
B. Owabucheli	Athletics	Men's Shot Put 1A	-	
B. Owabucheli	Athletics	Men's Slalom 1A	-	
Lucy Wanjiru	Athletics	Women's 200 m 3	-	
Lucy Wanjiru	Athletics	Women's 60 m 3	-	
Lucy Wanjiru	Athletics	Women's Discus Throw 3	-	
Lucy Wanjiru	Athletics	Women's Javelin 3		
Lucy Wanjiru	Athletics	Women's Shot Put 3	-	

== Lawn bowls ==
Two Kenyan athletes, Godfrey Ithongo and Maurice Kamia, competed in lawn bowls in Germany. Neither medaled. Maurice Kamia was the only member of the team that had participated at Kenya's Paralympic debut in 1972. He had only participated in athletics at those Games.

Athlete		Event	Medal	Ref
Godfrey Ithongo	Lawn Bowls	Men's Pairs 2-5	-	
Maurice Kamia	Lawn Bowls	Men's Pairs 2-5	-	
Maurice Kamia	Lawn Bowls	Men's Singles 2-5	-	

== Table tennis ==
Kenya was represented by two table tennis players in Germany, Timothy Ngumba and B. Owabucheli.

Athlete		Event	Medal	Ref
Timothy Ngumba	Table Tennis	Men's Singles 1A	-	
Timothy Ngumba	Table Tennis	Men's Teams 1B	-	
B. Owabucheli	Table Tennis	Men's Singles 1A		
B. Owabucheli	Table Tennis	Men's Teams 1B		

== Weightlifting ==
Kenya was represented by two weightlifters in Germany, Christopher Kipkemboi and Christopher Kipkemboi.

Athlete		Event	Medal	Ref
Christopher Kipkemboi	Weightlifting	Men's Featherweight -57 kg Paraplegic	-	
Jason Sichhangi	Weightlifting	Men's Featherweight -57 kg Paraplegic	-	

== See also ==
- Kenya at the Paralympics
