= Kenya at the 1984 Summer Paralympics =

- IPC code: KEN
- NPC: Kenya National Paralympic Committee

in Stoke Mandeville/New York
- Competitors: 13
- Medals Ranked 34th: Gold 1 Silver 1 Bronze 1 Total 3

Summer Paralympics appearances (overview)
- 1972; 1976; 1980; 1984; 1988; 1992; 1996; 2000; 2004; 2008; 2012; 2016; 2020; 2024

Kenya competed at the 1984 Summer Paralympics in Stoke Mandeville, Great Britain and New York City, United States.

== Team ==
Kenya made their third Paralympic Games appearance in Stoke Mandeville, Great Britain and New York City, United States. Their delegation included 13 sportspeople, 11 men and 2 women.

== Medalists ==
13 competitors from Kenya won 3 medals, one of each colour, and finished 34th in the medal table.

Medal	Name	Sport	Event
Gold	Japheth Musyoki	Athletics	Men's shot put 3
Silver	Japheth Musyoki	Athletics	Men's discus throw 3
Bronze	Lucy Wanjiru	Athletics	Women's javelin throw 3

== See also ==
- Kenya at the Paralympics
- Kenya at the 1984 Summer Olympics
