= Kenya at the 2016 Summer Paralympics =

- IPC code: KEN
- NPC: Kenya National Paralympic Committee

in Rio de Janeiro
- Competitors: 24 in 4 sports
- Medals Ranked 35th: Gold 3 Silver 1 Bronze 2 Total 6

Summer Paralympics appearances (overview)
- 1972; 1976; 1980; 1984; 1988; 1992; 1996; 2000; 2004; 2008; 2012; 2016; 2020; 2024

Kenya competed at the 2016 Summer Paralympics in Rio de Janeiro, Brazil, from 7 September to 18 September 2016.

== The Team ==
The team's Chef de Mission was Maina Kamau. The Kenyan delegation scheduled to compete was 24 strong, with 19 athletes and 5 guides.

== Kenya National Paralympic Committee ==
There were allegations of corruption inside the Kenya National Paralympic Committee by the Nairobi News and Daily Nation in regards to the size and selection of people to go as part of the Kenyan delegation to Rio.

== Funding and support ==
Kenya's Paralympic campaign had funding issues, which made it difficult for its sportspeople to attend world championship events as part of their Rio qualifying efforts. Overall issues with lack of funding led to questions by the country's NPC if the country could end up missing the 2016 Paralympics entirely because sportspeople cannot attend important qualifying events. If they missed the Games, it would be the first time the country missed them since they boycotted the 1976 Paralympics in Toronto.

The government had budgeted US$1.2 million/Sh130mn to send the team to Rio. Safaricom sponsored the team by providing Sh5mn to assist in costs to compete.

== Medals ==
Kenya finished sixth among all African countries on the gold medal table. They won 3, along with 1 silver and 2 bronze medals to finish with 6 total medals.

== Disability classifications ==
Every participant at the Paralympics has their disability grouped into one of five disability categories; amputation, the condition may be congenital or sustained through injury or illness; cerebral palsy; wheelchair athletes, there is often overlap between this and other categories; visual impairment, including blindness; Les autres, any physical disability that does not fall strictly under one of the other categories, for example dwarfism or multiple sclerosis. Each Paralympic sport then has its own classifications, dependent upon the specific physical demands of competition. Events are given a code, made of numbers and letters, describing the type of event and classification of the athletes competing. Some sports, such as athletics, divide athletes by both the category and severity of their disabilities, other sports, for example swimming, group competitors from different categories together, the only separation being based on the severity of the disability.

== Athletics ==
Kenyan athletes had to miss the 2015 IPC Athletics World Championships in Doha, Qatar because of a lack of funding, caused by the government failing to release funds on time. The funds of Sh8 million for 19 athletes had been approved by the government prior to the team heading to the African Games in Brazzaville, Republic of the Congo, in September. The government said they had no money to pay for participation as the government was broke. None of the Kenyan athletes going to the World Championships had yet qualified for Rio de Janeiro. Kenyan athletes had qualified for the World Championships after their performance at the 2015 African Championships in Tunisia. At that event, the Kenyan squad won four gold, four silver and three bronze medals. Kenyan athletes had also missed the 2013 IPC Athletics World Championships as a result of funding issues. Athletes impacted by the lack of funding and being unable to attend the 2015 World Championships included 1500m T11 world record holder Samuel Muchai. The Kenyan NPC hopes they can get wild card draws in athletics that will allow the club to send track and field competitors to Rio de Janeiro.

Kenya was scheduled to send 19 athletes to compete at the Rio de Janeiro Games. The delegation was also scheduled to include 10 guides and 16 other officials. Three of the spots for Kenya were wildcards. Most of the members who qualified for Rio de Janeiro did so at an IPC Athletics competition in Marrakesh, Morocco.

The athletics team included Henry Kirwa. He competed at the 2008 and 2012 Games, and had also been a United Nations named Kenyan of the Year. Kirwa won bronze in Rio de Janeiro in the 1,500 metres event.

Nelly Nasimiyu was also part of the delegation. Scheduled to compete in the T12 1500m event, they had a wildcard invitation to Rio de Janeiro. Other team members included Samuel Muchai, Henry Kirwa, Wilson Bii, Erick Sang, Nancy Chelagat and Henry Sugi. Kenya had originally nominated 28 athletes to participate in athletics, but the IPC only accepted 19.

== Powerlifting ==
Gabriel Magu was given a wild card invitation to participate in powerlifting in Rio.

== Rowing ==
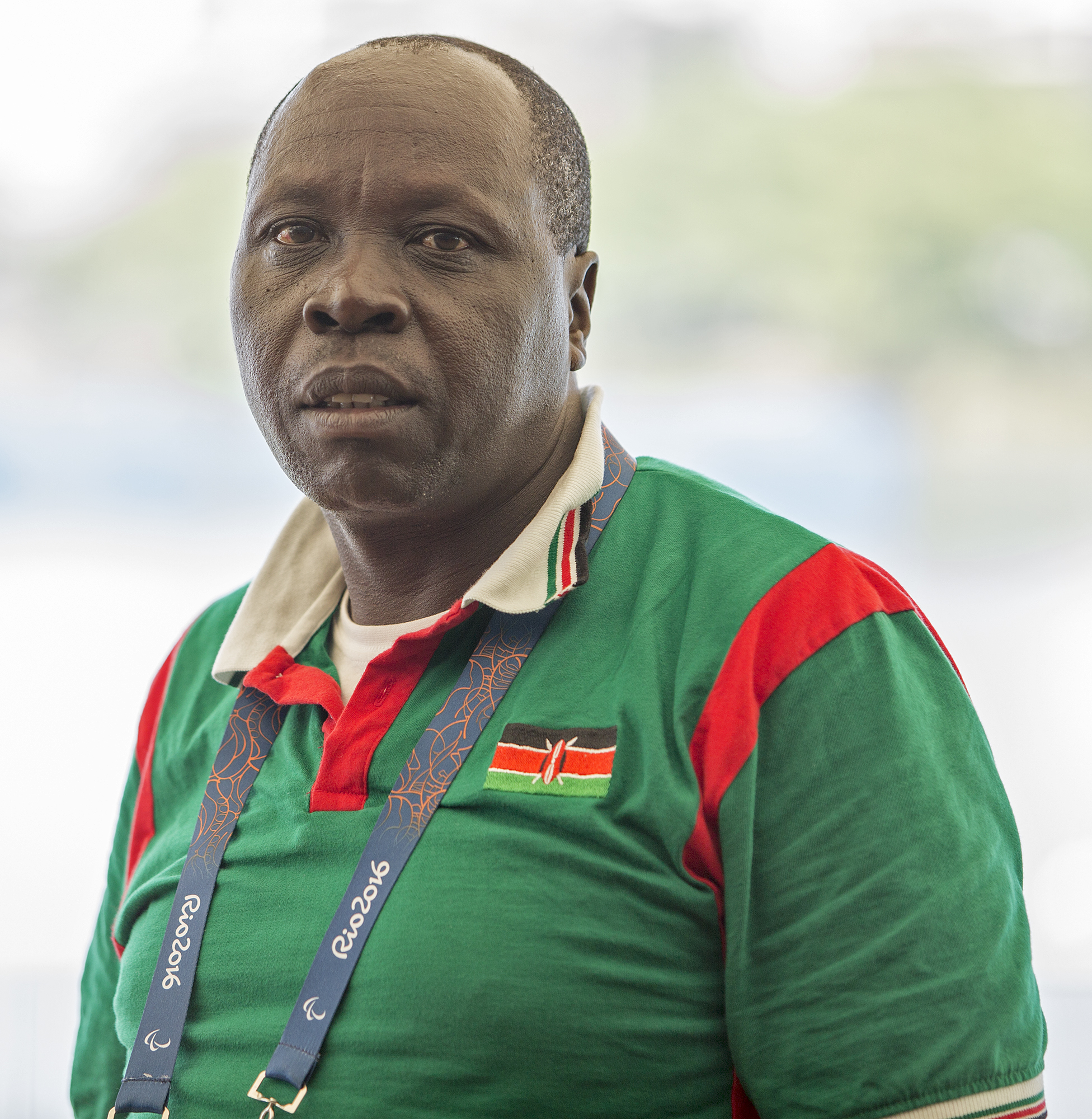
Kenyan rowing coach, Marco Galeon

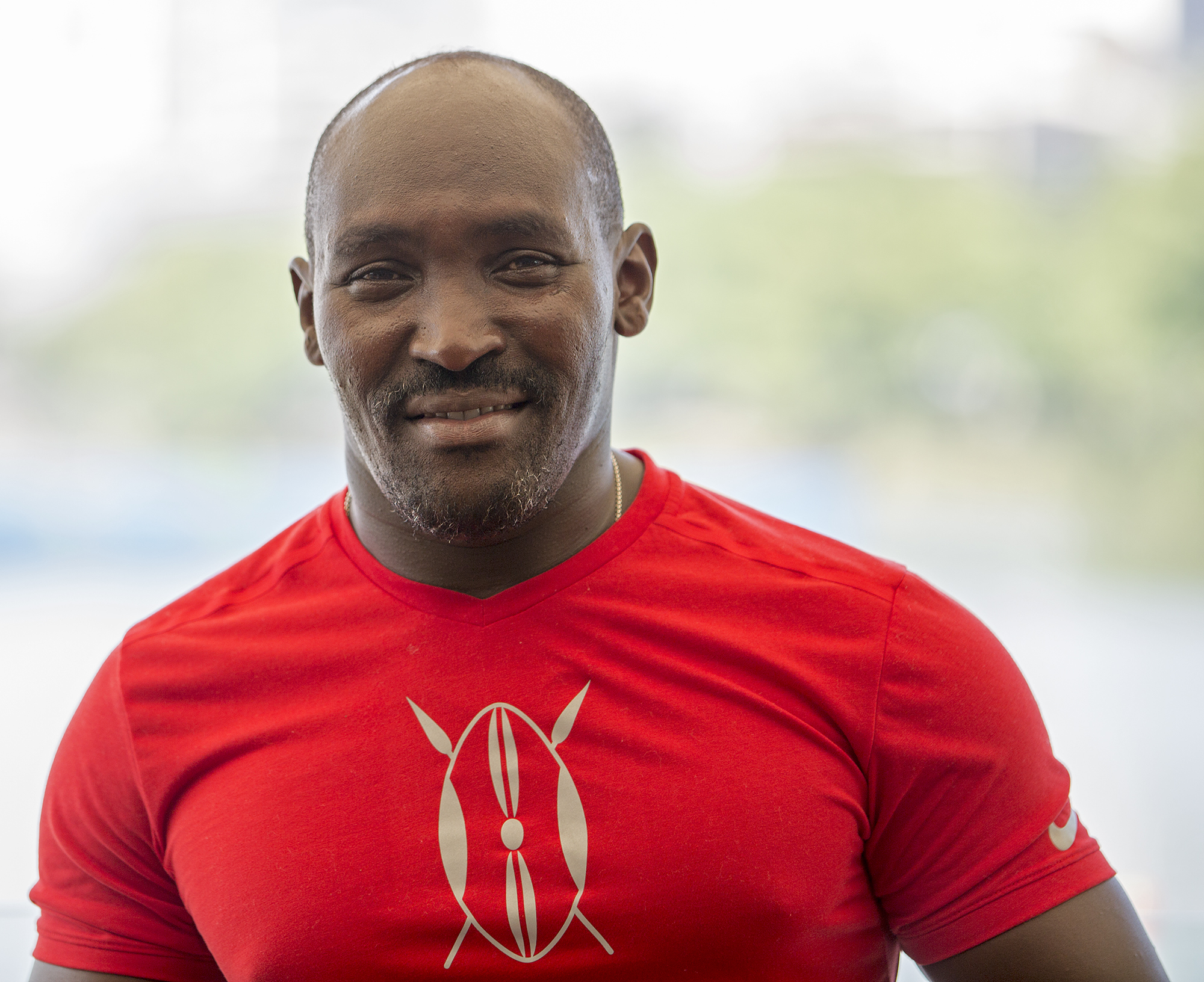
Kenyan rowing competitor, Itaken Kipelian

Rowing made a commitment to developing the sport in Africa, with three countries getting four totals bearths to the Rio Games: Kenya, Zimbabwe and South Africa. Only the South African boat in the LTAMix4+ made it through to the finals.

Kenya was scheduled to compete in rowing in Rio. It was the first time the country was to participate in the sport at the Paralympic level.

== Swimming ==
Lack of government funding to support Paralympic support threatened Kenyan participation at the 2015 IPC Swimming World Championships.

== See also ==
- Kenya at the 2016 Summer Olympics
