= Sergei Khodakov =

Russian Paralympic athlete (1966–2019)

Sergei Khodakov Сергей Ходаков
- Khodakov in 2012

Personal information
- Full name: Sergei Vladimirovich Khodakov
- Nationality: Russian
- Born: 11 March 1966 Irkutsk, Russian SFSR, Soviet Union
- Died: 8 January 2019 (aged 52) Irkutsk, Russia

Sport
- Country: Russia
- Sport: Track and field athletics
- Coached by: Yuri Rybin
- Retired: 2006
Medal record
Men's para-athletics
Paralympic Games
Representing Unified Team
Gold medal – first place	1992 Barcelona	Discus throw B2
Silver medal – second place	1992 Barcelona	Javelin throw B2
Silver medal – second place	1992 Barcelona	Shot put B2
Representing Russia
Gold medal – first place	1996 Atlanta	Discus throw F11
Bronze medal – third place	1996 Atlanta	Shot put F11

Sergei Vladimirovich Khodakov (Russian: Сергей Владимирович Ходаков; 11 March 1966 – 8 January 2019) was a paralympic athlete from Russia competing mainly in category F12 throwing events.

== Early life ==
Khodakov was part of the Unified team that travelled to Barcelona for the 1992 Summer Paralympics after the collapse of the Soviet Union. There he won silver medals in both the javelin and shot as well as winning the B2 discus gold medal. Four years later he travelled with the Russian team to the United States for the 1996 Summer Paralympics where he defended his discus title but could only manage a bronze in the shot and fifth in the javelin. He competed in a third and final games in Sydney in 2000 where he competed in the shot and discus once again but could not add any further medals.

Sergei Khodakov died in 2019 at 52 years old.
