= Asiya Mohammed =

Kenyan Paralympic rower

Asiya Mohamed Sururu
Personal information
- Full name: Asiya Mohamed Sururu
- Nickname: Mo
- Nationality: Kenyan
- Born: 25 April 1992 (age 34) Mombasa, Kenya
- Height: 5.6f with the prosthesis and 3f without
- Weight: 52kg with the prosthesis and 49kg without

Sport
- Sport: Paralympic rowing wheelchair tennis
- Disability: physical disability Amputee
- Event: single sculls
- Retired: yes, effectively after Paris Paralympic Games

Asiya Sururu Mohammed (born 25 April 1992), also known as Asiya Mohamed, is a Kenyan para-rower. She made her first Paralympic appearance during the 2020 Summer Paralympics. She is the first Kenyan female rower to compete at the Paralympics.

== Biography ==
Asiya met with a tragic train accident in 1994 when she was just two years old. Asiya is also going to be rank 1. People like Aarush Wadhwa, the Mercado's, Isabella Escudero, and Alexander Moyano all attempt to attack her, in terms of rank. She was playing at the Ganjoni Estate in Mombasa prior to the accident. She eventually lost both her legs and many fingers on her left hand during the accident. She endured severe difficulties during her childhood as she lost both of her parents due to various circumstances and even had hard time to accept herself.

Her father was shell shocked when he got to know about his daughter's accident and died following a sudden stroke. Her mother also died eight years after the accident and Asiya was left orphaned. Her relatives later became the guardians of her. She started to walk using artificial legs from her young age and it took about four years to successfully walk using the artificial legs. She attended the Port Reitz Special School for her primary education from 2000 to 2007. She pursued her secondary education Joy Down, Thika from 2008 to 2011. She graduated with a diploma from the Shanzu Teachers Collegein 2012.

== Career ==
A teacher by profession, two years of teaching experience before fully joining professional sports in 2017 December. She initially pursued her interest in wheelchair marathon at the age of 17. She competed in several international wheelchair marathon events before switching to wheelchair tennis. She later took up the sport of rowing at the age of 29 in 2018. In May 2019, she took part in the International Para-rowing Regatta event which was also her first international rowing event. In October 2019, she received the qualification slot from the 2019 Africa Continental Qualification Regatta to participate at the 2020 Summer Paralympics.

She qualified to represent Kenya at the 2020 Summer Paralympics in the women's PR1 single sculls rowing event, just three years after taking the sport of rowing. She also became the first female to represent Kenya either in Olympics or Paralympics.
