= Frangs Karanja =

Kenyan Paralympic athlete

Medal record

Paralympic athletics

Representing Kenya

Paralympic Games
Bronze medal – third place	2004 Athens	5000 metres - T11

Frangs Karanja is a paralympic athlete from Kenya competing mainly in category T11 distance running events.

Frangs competed in both the 1500m and 5000m at the 2004 Summer Paralympics where he won a bronze medal in the longer event.
