= Julia Longorkaye =

Kenyan Paralympic athlete

Medal record

Track and field (athletics)

Representing Kenya

Paralympic Games
Silver medal – second place	2004 Athens	1500 metres - T12

Julia Longorkaye is a paralympic athlete from Kenya competing mainly in category T12 middle-distance events.

Julia competed in the 400m, 800m and 1500m at the 2004 Summer Paralympics winning the silver medal in the longer distance.
