= Zhang Zhen (athlete) =

Chinese Paralympic athlete

Personal information
- Born: 5 September 1984 (age 41) Shenyang, China

Sport
- Sport: Paralympic athletics
Medal record
Paralympic athletics
Representing China
Paralympic Games
Gold medal – first place	2008 Beijing	1500m T11
Gold medal – first place	2008 Beijing	5000m T11
World Para Athletics Championships
Bronze medal – third place	2011 Christchurch	1500m T11
Asian Para Games
Gold medal – first place	2010 Guangzhou	1500m T11

Zhang Zhen (Chinese: 张振; pinyin: Zhāng Zhèn; born 5 September 1984 in Shenyang) is a Paralympian athlete from China competing mainly in category T11 middle-distance events.

He competed in the 2008 Summer Paralympics in Beijing, China. There he won a gold medal in the men's 1500 metres - T11 event and a gold medal in the men's 5000 metres - T11 event.
