= Wilson Bii =

Kenyan Paralympic runner

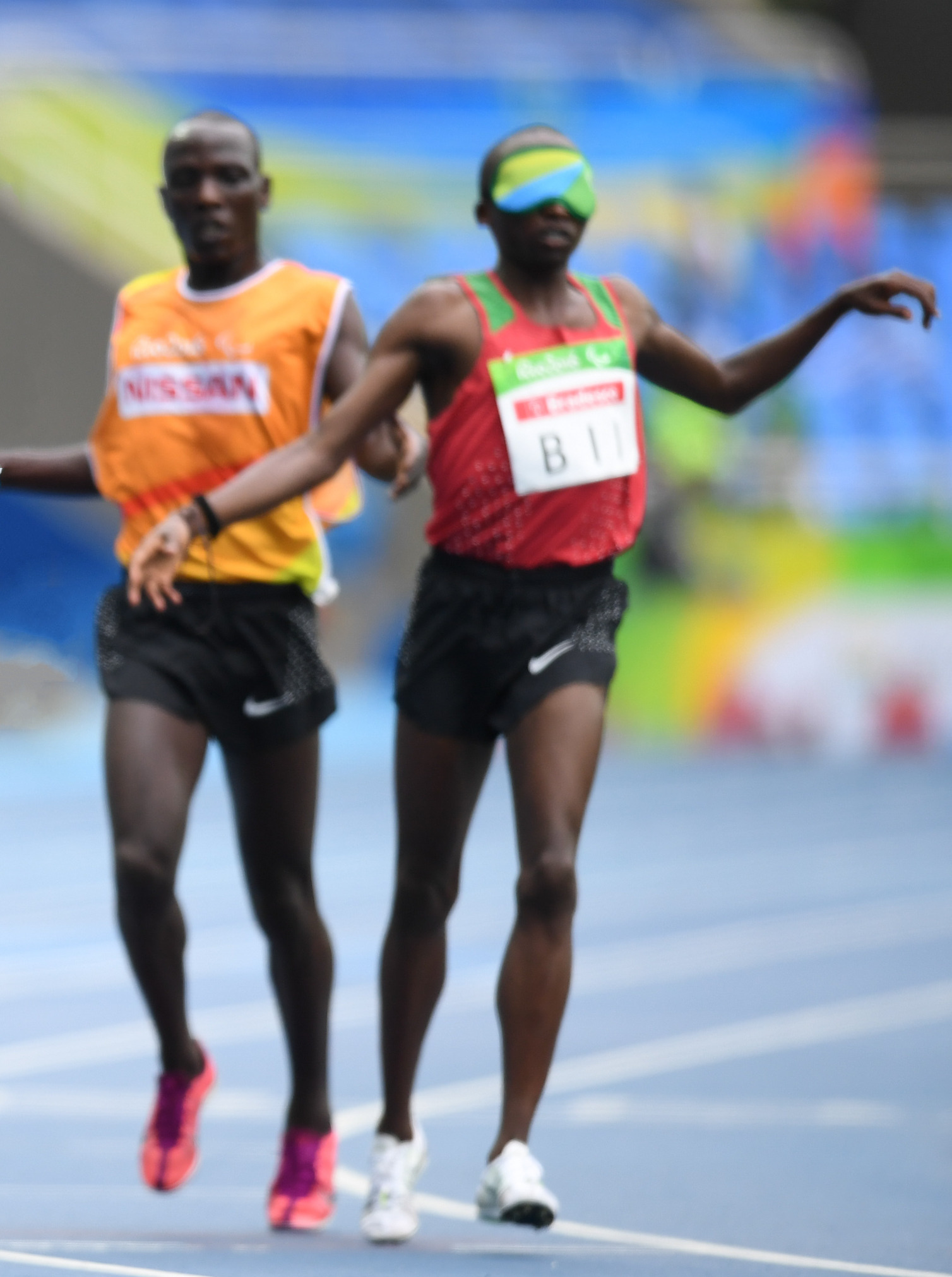
- Wilson Bii and his guide Benard Korir after finishing the 5000 m race at the 2016 Olympics

Personal information
- Nationality: Kenyan
- Born: 9 February 1986 (age 40)

Sport
- Country: Kenya
- Sport: Athletics
- Disability: visual impairment
- Disability class: T11
- Event: Middle-distance events
- Coached by: Ruth Jeruto Chumo (national)

Achievements and titles
- Paralympic finals: 2012 London; 2016 Rio
Medal record
Paralympic athletics
Representing Kenya
Paralympic Games
Bronze medal – third place	2016 Rio	5000m – T11

Wilson Bii (born 9 February 1986) is a visually impaired runner from Kenya, who competes mainly in T11 classification long-distance events.

== Athletics career ==
Bii has represented Kenya at two Summer Paralympics, beginning at London in 2012, there he entered the 5000 metres (T11) event but failed to finish the race. Four years later he attended the 2016 Summer Paralympics in Rio and posted a personal best of 15:22.96 to win the bronze medal in the 5000 metres just behind crowd favourite Odair Santos.
