= Abraham Cheruiyot Tarbei =

Kenyan Paralympic athlete

Medal record

Track and field (T46)

Representing Kenya

Paralympic Games
Gold medal – first place	2008 Beijing	1500m – T46
Gold medal – first place	2008 Beijing	5000m – T46

Abraham Cheruiyot Tarbei is a Paralympian athlete from Kenya competing mainly in category T46 middle-distance events.

He competed in the 2008 Summer Paralympics in Beijing, China. There he won a gold medal in the men's 1500 metres – T46 event and a gold medal in the men's 5000 metres – T46 event.
