= Gustavo Nieves =

Spanish Paralympic athlete (born 1982)

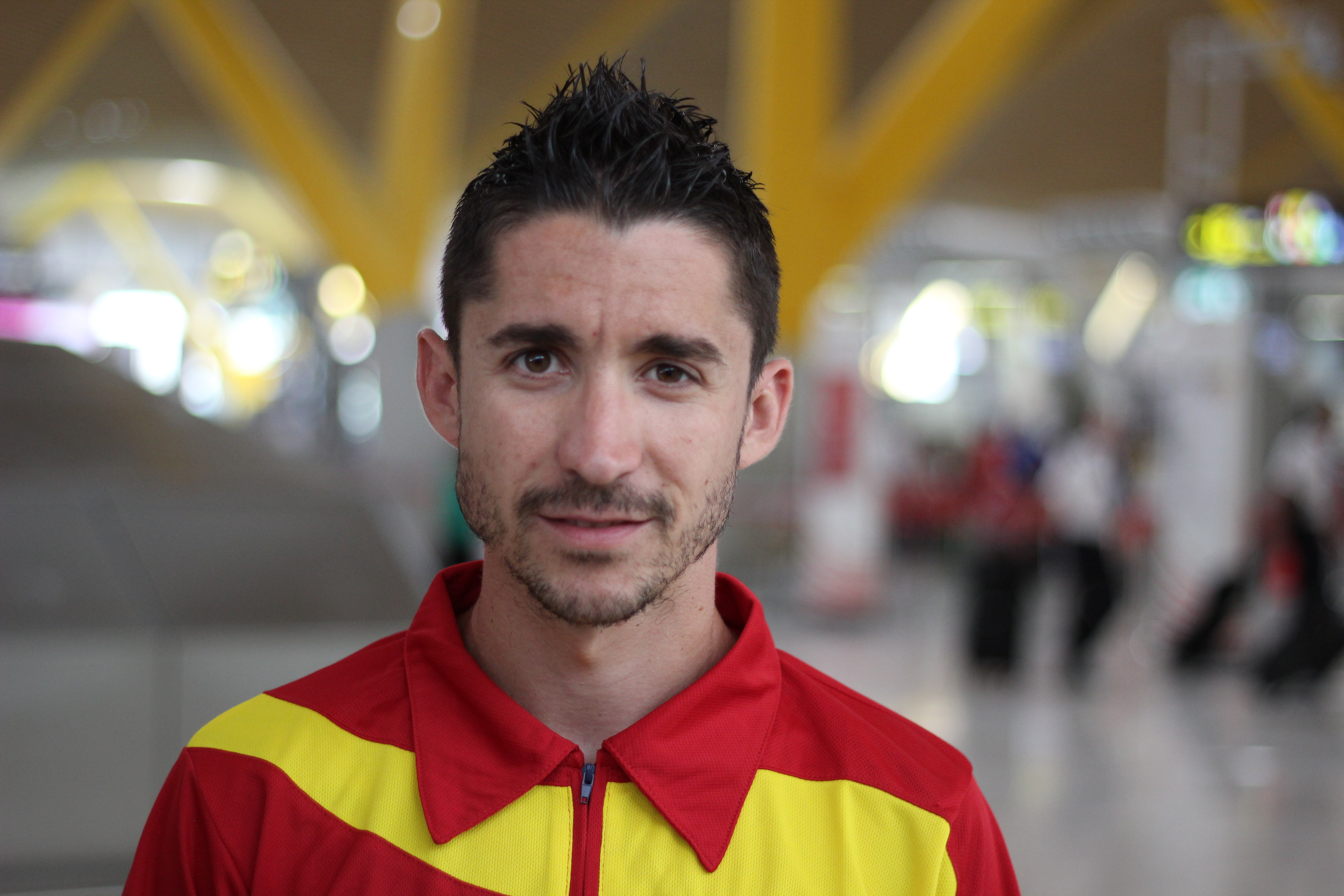

Personal information
- Full name: Gustavo Nieves Campello
- Nationality: Spanish
- Born: 9 March 1982 (age 44) Vilalba, Lugo, Spain

Sport
- Country: Spain
- Sport: Track and field (T12)
Medal record
IPC European Championships
Bronze medal – third place	2014 Swansea	5000m – T13

Gustavo Nieves Campello (born 9 March 1982) is a Spanish T12/B2 Paralympic athlete. Losing his vision suddenly at 17, he left the sport of football for athletics. He first raced competitively in 1998 Vigo half marathon. He went on to compete at IPC European and World Championships. He also competed at the 2000, 2008, 2012 and 2016 Summer Paralympics, but did not medal in any of these Games.

== Personal ==
Nieves was born on March 9, 1982 in Vilalba, Lugo. Shortly after his birth, his parents emigrated to Germany. His father remained in Germany and was still there as of 2009, but Gustavo Nieves returned to Spain when he was five years old.

Nieves has a disability: he has partial vision. He lost his vision when he was 17 years old. The onset of vision loss was sudden and unexpected, and there is no clear reason why or if his vision will continue to deteriorate. Prior to that, he played football as a midfielder for Sárdoma in Spain's División de Honor Juvenil de Fútbol, and had tried out for Celta de Vigo. He quit the sport following the vision loss.

In the period between 2004 and 2012, Nieves was a student training to be a mining engineer at the University of Vigo. His initial preference was to study biology but his vision issues meant he could not use a microscope, so he made the academic program switch. He has a functional proficiency in English, and is able to argue with people in the language at athletic events.

== Athletics ==
Nieves is a T12/B2 track and field athlete, who took up athletics at the age of 17 following sudden onset vision loss. With no one in his family having participated in the sport, he initially started the sport casually by running at a park in Castrelos Vigo. His first competitive race was the 1998 Vigo half marathon. He was a member of the Celta Vigo athletics club, then joined the Gymnastic Society of Pontevedra athletic club. before leaving the club to join the Alejandro Gomez Athletics Club.

Nieves competed in the 2000 Summer Paralympics in Sydney, Australia where he finished sixth in the 10,000 meter race. He focused on his educational work in 2004 and did not compete 2004 Summer Paralympics. He was trying to get the credentials that would enable him to get a job as athletics did not provide enough money for him to live off the sport. Following the 2004 Games, more money was made available to Paralympic athletes and he was able to dedicate more time to the sport.

Competing at the 2008 Spanish national championships, Nieves finished first in the 10,000 meter T12 race. He competed at the 2008 Summer Paralympics in Beijing, China. Following the 2008 Games, he switched coaches to Pablo Diaz and joined Gymnastic Society of Pontevedra athletic club. He based his 2009 training in Pontevedra and Lugo, where he continued to be coached by Pablo Diaz. During the season, he had a goal of trying to prepare for qualifying for the 2012 Summer Paralympics. He competed in the 2009 Spanish national athletics championships. At the 2009 IPC European Athletics Championships, he won two gold medals and one silver medal while setting a world record in the 10,000 meters. His second gold was in the 5,000 meters and the silver was in the 1,500 meters. In 2009, he set a world record in the T12 10,000 meter event during a race in Galicia.

In 2010, Nieves set a world record in the T12 10,000 meter race and then bettered his own world record 40 days later at a race in Jerez de la Frontera. He competed in the 2011 Pontevedra half marathon. In 2011, he injured the third metatarsal of the left foot as a result of athletics. His physical therapy following the injury involved training in the pool. He started competing again after the injury-imposed break in late September 2011 at a race in Berlin. In 2012, he was a recipient of a Plan ADO €2,500 coaching scholarship.

In March 2012, Nieves was training up to four hours a day at the Galician Sports Modernization Center (CGTD). Prior to the start of the London Games, he trained with several other visually impaired Spanish track and field athletes in Logroño. He finished first in the 2012 San Silvestre Candelaria 4,500 meter race. He competed at the 2012 Spanish national Paralympic athletic championships where he came in first in the 5,000 meters. A few months prior to the London Paralympics, he had problems with his tendons. He opted to not compete in the 2012 European Championships as a result. The city of Pontevedra held a sending off ceremony prior to the start of the Games where Nieves was honoured. He raced at the 2012 Summer Paralympics, finishing fourth in the 5,000 meters. His time was 4 seconds slower than his personal best.

Nieves competed in the 2013 San Silvestre Candelaria 4,500 meter race. In May 2013, he was attempting to qualify at the Kern Sauleda Pharme-Grand Prix for the IPC Athletics World Championships in Lyon, France, in the 5,000 meter race. Later that month, he attempted to qualify for the World Championships in the 10,000 meter race at a race in Huesca. Nieves has a goal of trying to qualify for and compete in the 2016 Summer Paralympics.
