= Odair Santos =

Brazilian Paralympic athlete

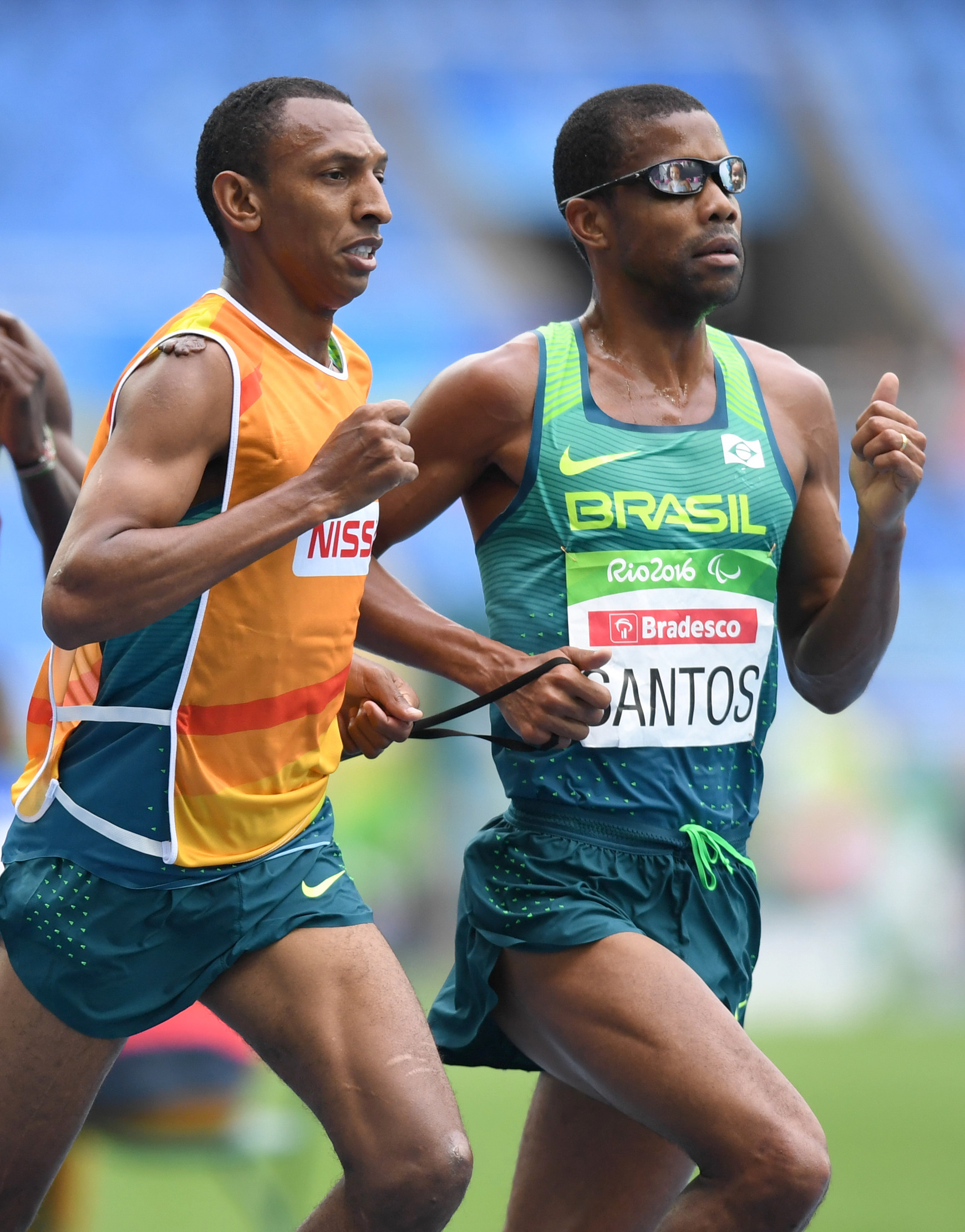
- Odair and Carlos Santos run 5000 m at the 2016 Paralympics

Personal information
- Nicknames: Dinho, Doca
- Born: 17 May 1981 (age 45) Limeira, Brazil
- Height: 181 cm (71 in)

Sport
- Country: Brazil
- Sport: Athletics
- Disability: visual impairment
- Disability class: T11
- Event: middle distance events
- Club: Centro de Treinamento Limeira Paralímpico
- Coached by: Amaury Verissimo (national); Fabio Breda (personal)

Achievements and titles
- Paralympic finals: 2004 Athens; 2008 Beijing; 2012 London; 2012 Rio
Medal record
Men's para athletics
Representing Brazil
Paralympic Games
Silver medal – second place	2004 Athens	5000m – T12
Silver medal – second place	2004 Athens	1500m – T13
Silver medal – second place	2012 London	1500m – T11
Silver medal – second place	2016 Rio	1500m – T11
Silver medal – second place	2016 Rio	5000m – T11
Bronze medal – third place	2004 Athens	800m – T12
Bronze medal – third place	2008 Beijing	800m – T12
Bronze medal – third place	2008 Beijing	5000m – T13
Bronze medal – third place	2008 Beijing	10000m – T12
World Championships
Gold medal – first place	2006 Assen	1500m – T12
Gold medal – first place	2011 Christchurch	1500m – T11
Gold medal – first place	2011 Christchurch	5000m – T11
Gold medal – first place	2011 Christchurch	10000m – T11
Gold medal – first place	2013 Lyon	800m – T11
Gold medal – first place	2013 Lyon	1500m – T11
Gold medal – first place	2013 Lyon	5000m – T11
Gold medal – first place	2015 Doha	1500m – T11
Silver medal – second place	2006 Assen	800m – T12
Bronze medal – third place	2006 Assen	4 × 100 m relay – T11–13
Parapan American Games
Gold medal – first place	2007 Rio de Janeiro	1500m T11
Gold medal – first place	2007 Rio de Janeiro	5000m T11
Gold medal – first place	2007 Rio de Janeiro	10000m T11
Gold medal – first place	2011 Guadalajara	1500m T11
Gold medal – first place	2011 Guadalajara	5000m T11
Gold medal – first place	2015 Toronto	1500m T11

Odair Santos (born 17 May 1981) is a visually impaired Paralympian athlete from Brazil competing mainly in T11 classification middle and long-distance events. A veteran of four Paralympics, Santos has won nine Paralympic medals, including five silver medals. Santos is also a four time IPC World champion at the 1,500 metres event, being unbeaten from 2006 to 2015.

== Athletics career ==
Santos first represented Brazil at a Paralympic Games when he competed in the 2004 Summer Paralympics in Athens, Greece. There he won a silver medal in the men's 5000 metres – T12 event, a silver medal in the men's 1500 metres – T13 event, a bronze medal in the men's 800 metres – T12 event and finished fourth in the men's 4 × 100 metre relay – T11–13 event. He also competed at the 2008 Summer Paralympics in Beijing, China. There he won a bronze medal in the men's 800 metres – T12 event, a bronze medal in the men's 5000 metres – T13 event and a bronze medal in the men's 10,000 metres – T12 event. At the 2012 Summer Paralympics he won silver in the Men's 1500 metres – T11 event.

In the buildup to the 2016 Summer Paralympics in Rio, Santos attended the 2015 IPC Athletics World Championships in Doha. There he took gold in the 1500m – T11, but the events of the 5000m – T11 final saw Santos dramatically lose a commanding lead on the last lap. In the closing stages of the race with Santos clear of the rest of the field he fell to the floor with exhaustion, on returning to his feet he was overtaken by Chile's Cristian Valenzuela. Despite the support of his guide, Santos collapsed a second time, and was passed by Jason Dunkerley of Canada. Santos rose again only to collapse meters from the line to lose the bronze medal place to Japan's Shinya Wada.

He holds the 800 m world record for T11 (totally blind) athletes.
