= Mary Nakhumicha Zakayo =

Kenyan Paralympic athlete (born 1979)

Personal information
- Born: April 19, 1979 (age 47) Kenya

Sport
- Country: Kenya
- Sport: Para athletics
- Event: various
Medal record
Women's para athletics
Representing Kenya
Paralympic Games
Gold medal – first place	1992 Barcelona	Javelin throw THW7
Silver medal – second place	1996 Atlanta	Javelin throw F55–57
Silver medal – second place	2000 Sydney	Javelin throw F58
Silver medal – second place	2008 Beijing	Javelin throw F57/58
Bronze medal – third place	2000 Sydney	Shot put F57
World Championships
Silver medal – second place	2002 Lille	Javelin throw F57/58
Bronze medal – third place	1994 Berlin	Shot put F57
Bronze medal – third place	2011 Christchurch	Javelin throw F57/58

Mary Nakhumicha Zakayo (born 19 April 1979) is a Kenyan Paralympic track athlete. She competes in the T57 class for javelin, shot put and discus throw. Her first Paralympics was 1992.

In 2008 she received the Kenyan Sports Personality of the Year Award. At the 2012 Summer Paralympics in London, she won the Whang Youn Dai Achievement Award. On accepting the award, she said, "The Paralympic Movement is spreading in my country and opens opportunities for people with disabilities and help change the perceptions towards people with disabilities in a positive way."
