= Henry Kirwa =

Kenyan Paralympic athlete

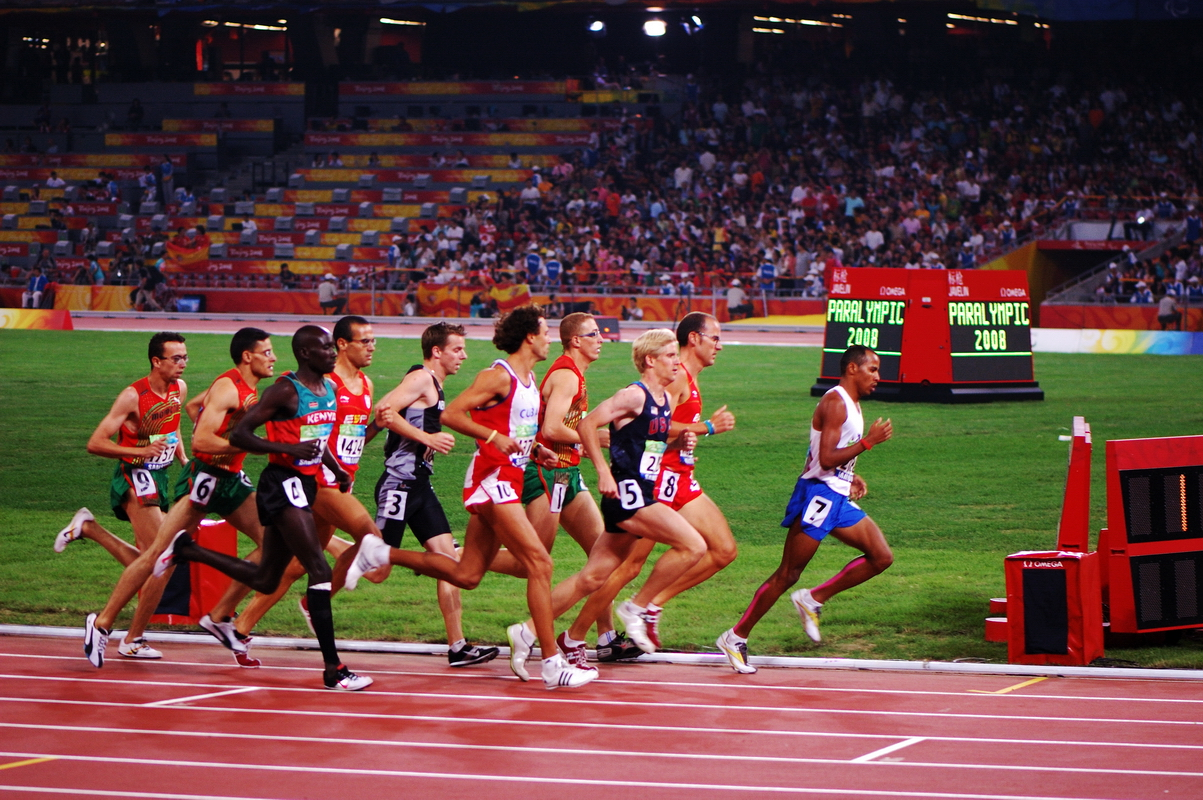
- Kirwa (number 4) in the men's 1500 metres T13 final at the 2008 Summer Paralympics

Personal information
- Full name: Henry Kiprono Kirwa
- Born: 4 May 1973 (age 53)

Sport
- Disability class: T12, T13
Medal record
Men's para athletics
Representing Kenya
Paralympic Games
Gold medal – first place	2008 Beijing	1,500 m T13
Gold medal – first place	2008 Beijing	5,000 m T13
Gold medal – first place	2008 Beijing	10,000 m T12
Gold medal – first place	2016 Rio de Janeiro	5,000 m T12
Bronze medal – third place	2012 London	5,000 m T12
Bronze medal – third place	2016 Rio de Janeiro	1,500 m T13

Henry Kiprono Kirwa (born 4 May 1973), commonly known as Henry Kirwa, is a Paralympian athlete from Kenya competing mainly in category T13 middle-distance events.

He competed in the 2008 Summer Paralympics in Beijing, China. There he won a gold medal in the men's 1500 metres - T13 event, a gold medal in the men's 5000 metres - T13 event and a gold medal in the men's 10000 metres - T12 event.
