= Henry Wanyoike =

Kenyan long-distance runner (born 1974)

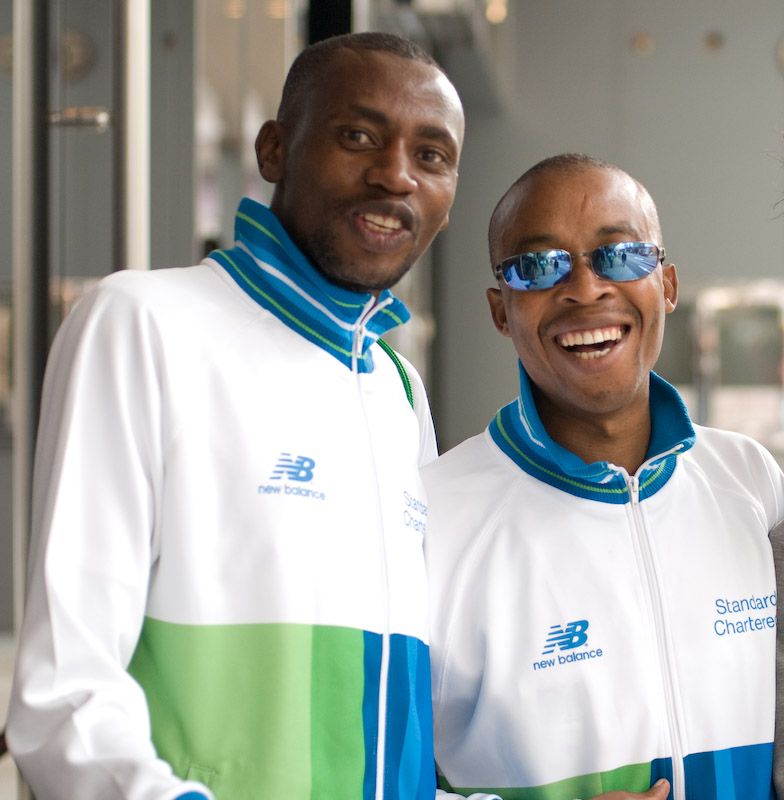
Joseph Kibunja & Henry Wanyoike in Hong Kong, 2008

Henry Wanyoike (born 10 May 1974) is a Kenyan long-distance runner. He is blind and competes in the Paralympics and in marathon racing.

== Early career ==
Wanyoike is one of the world's fastest runners. While still a child he was already being groomed to join an elite corps of athletes in a country that is known for producing more world-class middle-distance runners over the last twenty years than any other country on earth. He excelled at the 5,000 and 10,000-meter distances.

Wanyoike became almost completely blind after suffering a stroke on May 1, 1995. "I went to bed a normal person, the following day I found myself in darkness." That night he lost 95% of his vision, and lost the rest gradually over the next few years. He was in despair. "I thought my life had come to an end."

His mother Grace brought him to the Kikuyu Eye Clinic (a nearby hospital supported by Christian Blind Mission International (CBMI), recognised as one of the best centers for the visually impaired in East Africa. Petra Verweyen, the chief of the Low Vision Project of the clinic, helped him to find his way back into life and arranged for him to learn to knit pullovers. With gratitude for the help he received at the project he promised himself he would help other blind people and teach them to become self-sufficient, as he had done. After winning his first gold medal in Sydney, Australia in 2000 at the Paralympic games, he has bought knitting machines through prize money and charitable donations from such international personalities as Arnold Schwarzenegger. He now employs other blind Kenyans and teaches them how to knit pullovers.

A blind runner is connected to a guide by a tether on the wrist, which the guide uses to subtly indicate, without breaking stride, when to turn, accelerate or avoid an obstacle, whether on the track or on the road, as in a marathon. Once Henry got used to working with guides, he quickly established himself as a world-class non-sighted runner, earning a spot on the Kenyan national squad for the 5000-meter race at the Sydney Paralympics in 2000. As he ran so quickly another problem emerged, that his guides could not keep up. Nevertheless, he not only won the gold medal but set a Paralympic record too. Now Wanyoike runs with his track guide and childhood friend, Joseph Kibunja.

Unlike most Kenyan athletes, who tend to concentrate on one or two events, Henry is among those very few who have ventured beyond. Over the last five years, he has won gold or silver medals in the marathon, half-marathon, 10 km road race, the 10,000 meters, 5,000 meters and the 1,500 meters. No other Kenyan athlete has ventured so widely and so successfully. His time of 2:31:31 at the Hamburg Marathon in 2005 still stands as the world record for blind runners.

== Achievements ==
- December 2007: 8th overall at Singapore half-marathon (1:25:15)
- November 2006: 121st at the New York Marathon (2:40:14) - 38,368 participants
- April 2006: 5th. at the Bonn half-marathon (1:14:44) - 2,675 participants
- February 2006: 6th at the Hong Kong half-marathon (1:16:47) - 9,000 participants
- January 2006: 53rd at the Mumbai Marathon (2:52) - Only 177 of 3,000 participants came to the goal in time (5h)
- December 2005: Winner of the Singapore half-marathon (1:16:07)
- October 2005: 3rd at the TUI half-marathon in Palma, Mallorca (1:15:24)
- September 2005: Winner at the half-marathon in Wetzlar (01:14:41)
- May 2005: 3rd Place with approx. 4500 participants in the half-marathon in Hannover (1:11:25)
- April 2005 (24 April): New world record in Hamburg: 2:31:31
- April 2005 (17 April): New world record in London: 2:32:51
- September 2004: Athens gold and world record over 5,000 m (15:11.07) and 10,000 m (31:37.25)
- May 2004: Boston new fable world record time in the Marathon (2:33:20)
- February 2004: Hong Kong winner and world record in the half marathon (1:10:26)
- December 2003: Singapore silver in road running over 5,000 meters
- October 2003: Panafrican Games gold over 1500 meters
- August 2003: Canada gold over 5,000 meters and 10,000 meters
- May 2003: Winner in the Boston Marathon (2:49:03)
- October 2002: Boston Trophy winner over road running of 5,000 meters
- July 2002: Lille: two gold medals and world records over 5,000 m (15:17.75) and 10,000 m (32:34.31)
- April 2002: World record and gold in the blind marathon of Japan
- January 2002: in Cairo: two gold medals over 800 and 1500 meters, silver over 400 meters
- 2000: Paralympics in Sydney: Winner and the first gold medal over 5,000 meters (15:46.29)
