= Francis Thuo Karanja =

Kenyan Paralympic athlete

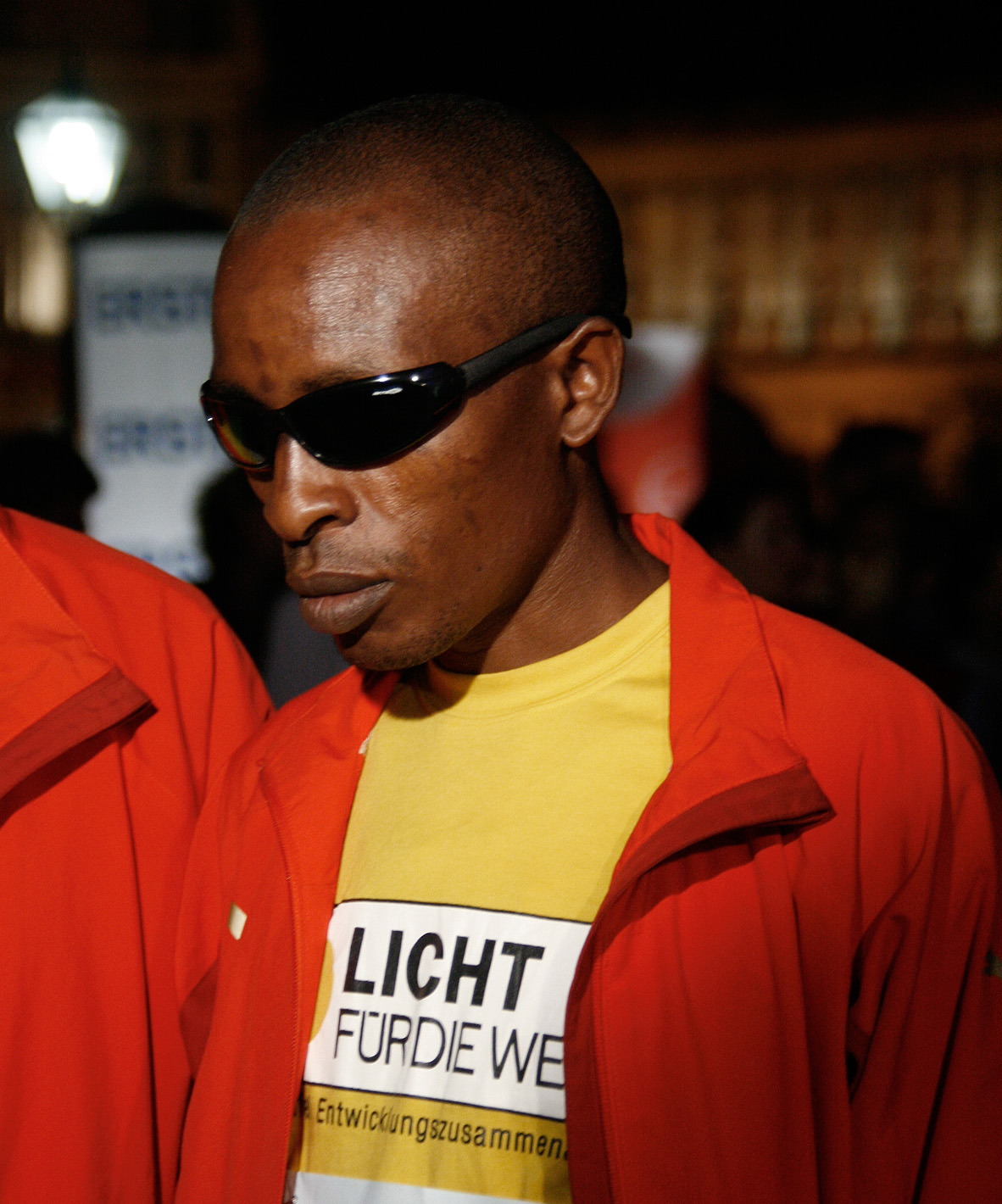
- Francis Thuo Karanja in Vienna 2009
Medal record
Paralympic athletics
Representing Kenya
Paralympic Games
| Silver medal – second place | 2008 Beijing | 5000m – T11 |

Francis Thuo Karanja (born 6 April 1975) is a Kenyan Paralympian athlete competing mainly in category T11 long-distance events.

He competed in the 2008 Summer Paralympics in Beijing, China. There he won a silver medal in the men's 5000 metres - T11 event, went out in the first round of the men's 1500 metres - T11 event and finished fifth in the men's 10000 metres - T12 event.

In 2007, the Kenyan Francis Thou Karanja, accompanied by his brother Paul Njoronge Karanja, ran a world record for blind people over the half marathon distance with 1:10:02 h at the Graz Marathon in the Austrian city of Graz.
