= Samwel Mushai Kimani =

Kenyan Paralympic athlete

Samwel Mūchai Kìmani
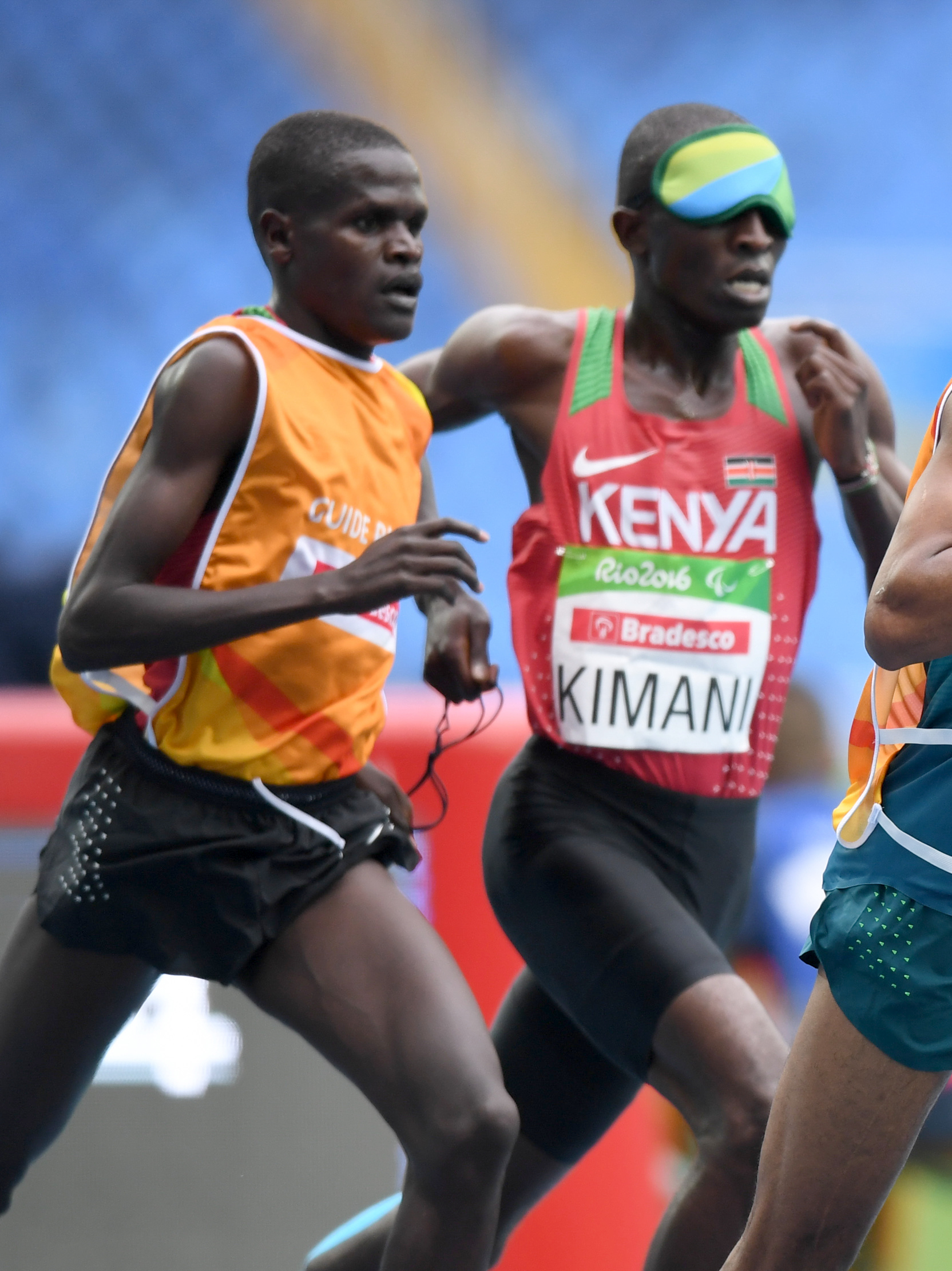
- Samwel Mushai Kimani and his guide James Boit run 5000 m at the 2016 Paralympics

Personal information
- Born: 26 December 1989 (age 36)

Sport
- Country: Kenya
- Sport: Para-athletics
- Disability: Visual impairment
- Disability class: T11
- Event: Middle distance events

Achievements and titles
- Paralympic finals: 2008 Beijing; 2016 Rio
Medal record
Representing Kenya
Paralympic Games
Silver medal – second place	2008 Beijing	1500 m – T11
Gold medal – first place	2012 London	1500 m – T11
Gold medal – first place	2016 Rio de Janeiro	5000 m – T11
World Championships
Gold medal – first place	2017 London	5000 m T11
Gold medal – first place	2019 Dubai	5000 m T11
African Games
Bronze medal – third place	2015 Brazzaville	400 m – T11

Samwel Mūchai Kìmani (born 26 December 1989) is a visually impaired middle-distance runner from Kenya. He won the 5000 m – T11 event at the 2016 Paralympics. Previously he won a silver and a gold medal in the 1500 m – T11 at the 2008 and 2012 Paralympics, respectively. Kimani won gold in the 2017 Para Athletics championships in London on Friday 21 July in the T11 1500m.
