= Athletics at the 2000 Summer Paralympics =

Athletics at the XI Paralympic Games
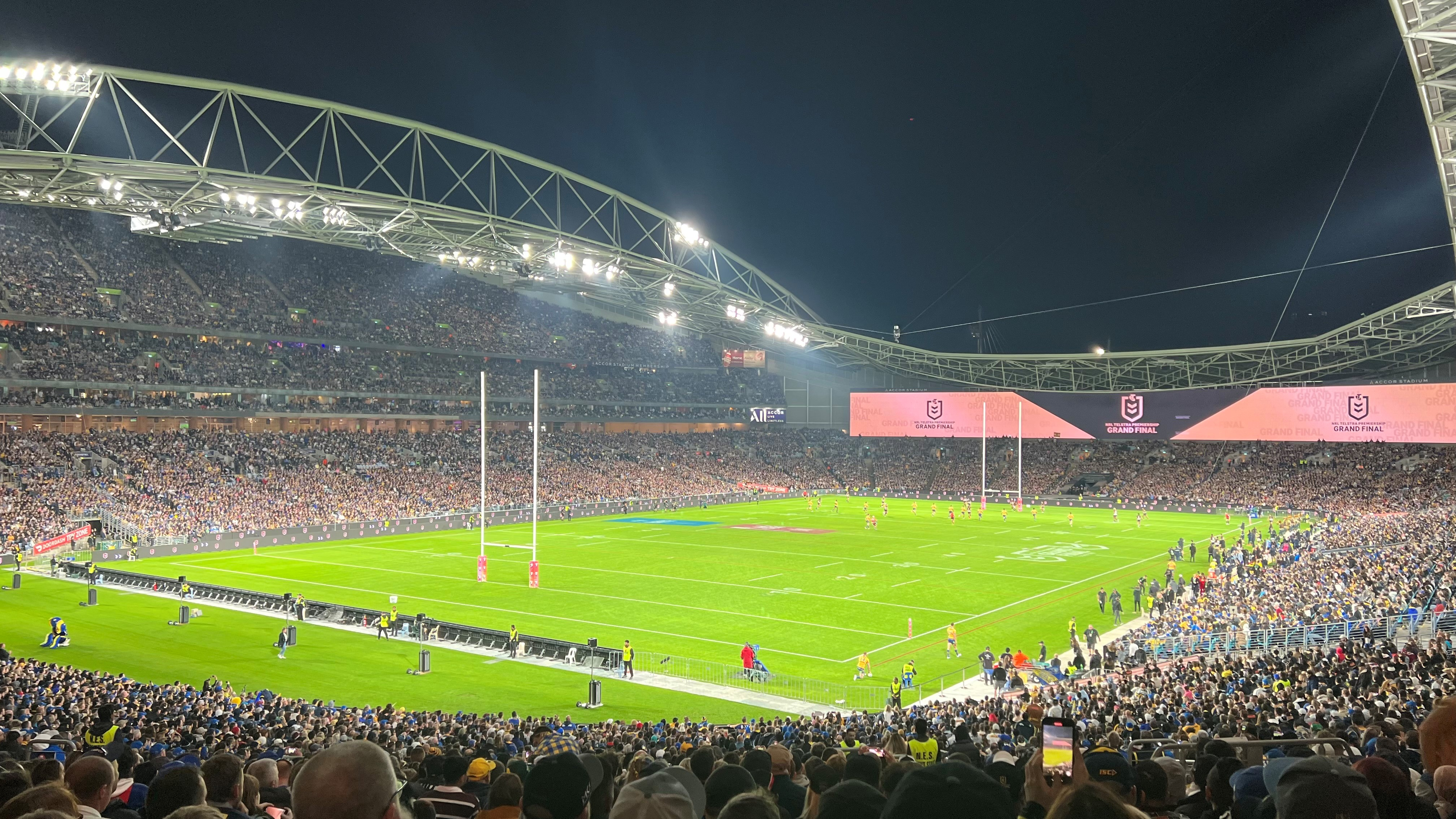
- Host stadium (shown in 2022)
- Venue: Stadium Australia
- Dates: 20 to 29 October 2000
- Competitors: 1044 from 104 nations

Athletics at the 2000 Summer Paralympics comprised a total of 234 events, 165 for men and 69 for women. Athletes were classified according to the extent and type of their disability.

- Classes 11-13: visually impaired athletes
- Class 20: intellectually disabled athletes
- Classes 32-38: athletes with cerebral palsy; classes 32 to 34 competed while in wheelchairs
- Classes 42-46: amputees and those with other disabilities (les autres)
- Classes 51-58: athletes with spinal cord disabilities; these classes competed while in wheelchairs

Class numbers were preceded by a "T" for track events, an "F" for field events, and a "P" for the pentathlon. Lower respective class numbers corresponded to more severe disability. An exception to this classification scheme arose for athletes with severe cerebral palsy competing in field events; there were no F32 events, so athletes from this category instead competed in class F51 against athletes with spinal cord disabilities.

== Participating nations ==
- Algeria (6)
- Angola (1)
- Argentina (10)
- Australia (65)
- Austria (17)
- Azerbaijan (3)
- Bahrain (2)
- Belarus (16)
- Belgium (7)
- Benin (1)
- Bosnia and Herzegovina (1)
- Brazil (10)
- Bulgaria (4)
- Canada (44)
- Chile (1)
- China (27)
- Chinese Taipei (1)
- Colombia (1)
- Costa Rica (1)
- Croatia (7)
- Cuba (7)
- Cyprus (2)
- Czech Republic (20)
- Denmark (5)
- Ecuador (2)
- Egypt (14)
- El Salvador (1)
- Estonia (4)
- Fiji (2)
- Finland (4)
- France (24)
- Germany (70)
- Great Britain (46)
- Greece (19)
- Honduras (1)
- Hong Kong (7)
- Hungary (8)
- Iceland (2)
- India (1)
- Indonesia (3)
- Individual Paralympic Athletes (1)
- Iran (12)
- Iraq (3)
- Ireland (17)
- Israel (2)
- Italy (21)
- Ivory Coast (2)
- Jamaica (3)
- Japan (38)
- Jordan (2)
- Kazakhstan (1)
- Kenya (12)
- Kuwait (16)
- Latvia (5)
- Lebanon (2)
- Lesotho (2)
- Lithuania (9)
- Macau (1)
- Madagascar (1)
- Malaysia (3)
- Mauritania (1)
- Mexico (24)
- Moldova (6)
- Mongolia (1)
- Morocco (1)
- Netherlands (8)
- New Zealand (9)
- Nigeria (4)
- Norway (8)
- Oman (1)
- Palestine (2)
- Panama (1)
- Papua New Guinea (2)
- Philippines (1)
- Poland (27)
- Portugal (16)
- Puerto Rico (2)
- Qatar (1)
- Russia (22)
- Samoa (1)
- Saudi Arabia (4)
- Serbia and Montenegro (1)
- Singapore (1)
- Slovakia (8)
- Slovenia (5)
- South Africa (29)
- South Korea (8)
- Spain (56)
- Sri Lanka (1)
- Sweden (14)
- Switzerland (18)
- Thailand (12)
- Tonga (1)
- Tunisia (9)
- Ukraine (22)
- United Arab Emirates (12)
- United States (73)
- Uruguay (1)
- Vanuatu (2)
- Venezuela (2)
- Vietnam (1)
- Yugoslavia (2)
- Zambia (2)
- Zimbabwe (2)

== Medal summary ==
=== Medal table ===
Rank	Nation	Gold	Silver	Bronze	Total
1	Australia (AUS)	35	15	16	66
2	Great Britain (GBR)	16	14	18	48
3	United States (USA)	14	15	20	49
4	Spain (ESP)	14	12	11	37
5	Canada (CAN)	12	15	10	37
6	China (CHN)	11	10	7	28
7	South Africa (RSA)	11	7	7	25
8	Poland (POL)	10	6	3	19
9	France (FRA)	9	7	8	24
10	Iran (IRI)	9	1	4	14
11	Russia (RUS)	8	5	5	18
12	Germany (GER)	7	12	20	39
13	Switzerland (SUI)	7	4	4	15
14	Tunisia (TUN)	6	4	1	11
15	Czech Republic (CZE)	5	9	1	15
16	Italy (ITA)	5	4	4	13
17	Portugal (POR)	5	3	3	11
18	Mexico (MEX)	4	8	7	19
19	New Zealand (NZL)	4	4	2	10
20	Brazil (BRA)	4	4	1	9
21	Thailand (THA)	4	2	0	6
22	Egypt (EGY)	3	6	7	16
23	Denmark (DEN)	3	2	1	6
24	Hong Kong (HKG)	3	1	5	9
25	Algeria (ALG)	3	0	0	3
26	Japan (JPN)	2	10	5	17
27	Belarus (BLR)	2	6	9	17
28	Greece (GRE)	2	4	2	8
29	Cuba (CUB)	2	2	2	6
30	South Korea (KOR)	2	1	0	3
31	Ukraine (UKR)	1	14	10	25
32	Austria (AUT)	1	3	5	9
33	Belgium (BEL)	1	2	3	6
34	Kenya (KEN)	1	1	2	4
35	Finland (FIN)	1	1	1	3
35	Ireland (IRL)	1	1	1	3
37	Estonia (EST)	1	0	2	3
38	Ivory Coast (CIV)	1	0	1	2
39	Bulgaria (BUL)	1	0	0	1
39	Chinese Taipei (TPE)	1	0	0	1
39	Nigeria (NGR)	1	0	0	1
39	Zimbabwe (ZIM)	1	0	0	1
43	Sweden (SWE)	0	5	3	8
44	United Arab Emirates (UAE)	0	3	1	4
45	Argentina (ARG)	0	2	2	4
46	Netherlands (NED)	0	2	0	2
47	Kuwait (KUW)	0	1	4	5
48	Slovenia (SLO)	0	1	2	3
49	Bahrain (BRN)	0	1	1	2
49	Lithuania (LTU)	0	1	1	2
49	Panama (PAN)	0	1	1	2
49	Slovakia (SVK)	0	1	1	2
53	Norway (NOR)	0	1	0	1
54	Latvia (LAT)	0	0	3	3
55	Hungary (HUN)	0	0	2	2
56	Israel (ISR)	0	0	1	1
56	Palestine (PLE)	0	0	1	1
56	Puerto Rico (PUR)	0	0	1	1
56	Venezuela (VEN)	0	0	1	1
Totals (59 entries)		234	234	233	701

=== Men's events ===
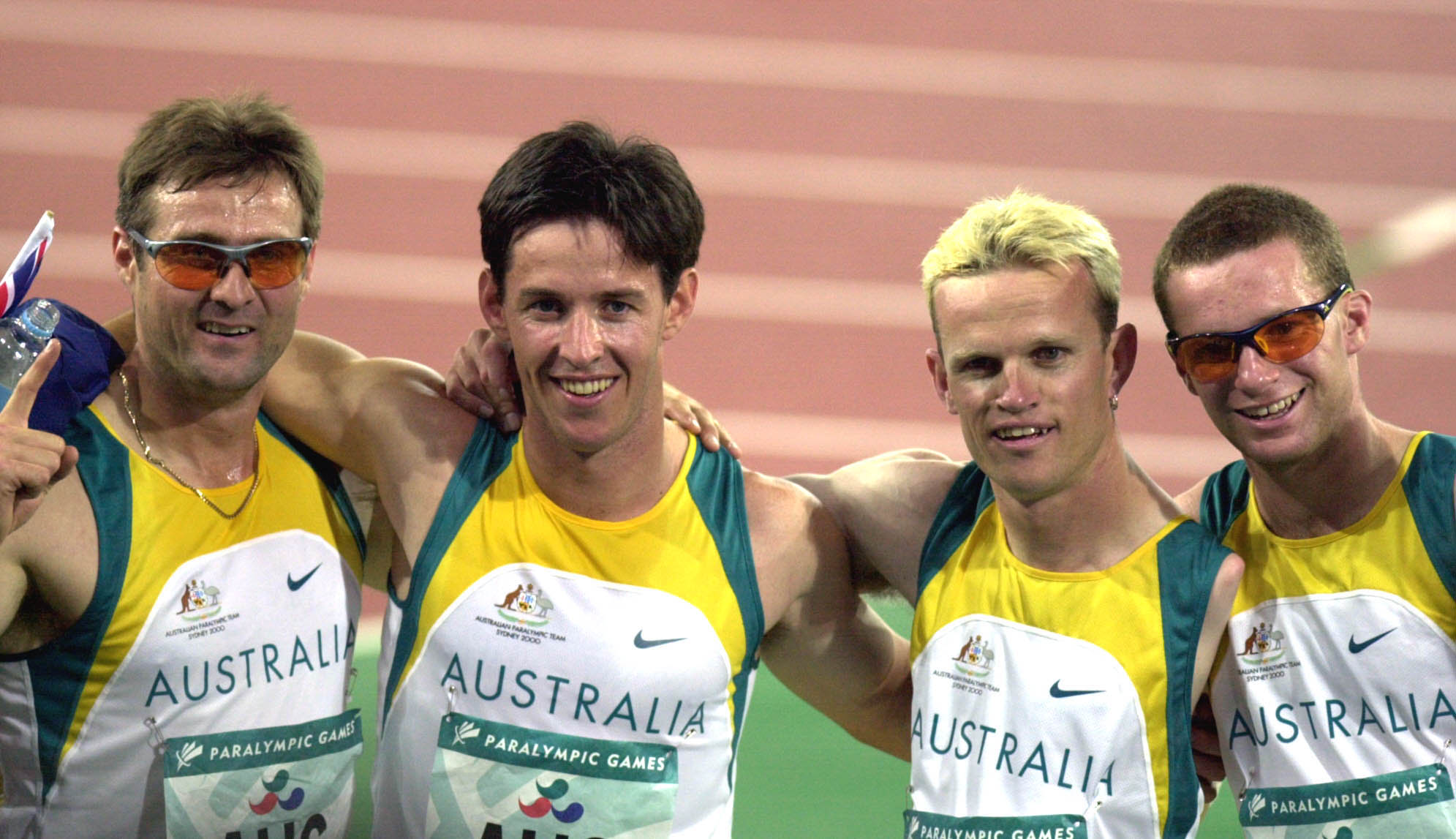
Australian track athletes (L-R) Neil Fuller, Stephen Wilson, Tim Matthews and Heath Francis after their gold medal win in the 4 x 400 m T46 relay, 2000 Summer Paralympics

Event	Gold	Silver	Bronze
100 m T11	Lorenzo Ricci; Italy	Petr Novak; Czech Republic	Oleksandr Ivanyukhin; Ukraine
100 m T12	Li Qiang; China	Igor Pashchenko; Ukraine	Gabriel Potra; Portugal
100 m T13	Nathan Meyer; South Africa	André Andrade; Brazil	Aldo Manganaro; Italy
100 m T20	José António Exposito; Spain	Juan Lopez; Spain	Andrew Newell; Australia
100 m T34	Ross Davis; United States	Jason Lachance; Canada	Kazuya Maeba; Japan
100 m T35	Lloyd Upsdell; Great Britain	Roman Dzyuba; Ukraine	Richard White; Great Britain
100 m T36	Wa Wai So; Hong Kong	Serhiy Norenko; Ukraine	Andriy Zhyltsov; Ukraine
100 m T37	Mohamed Allek; Algeria	Peter Haber; Germany	Matt Slade; New Zealand
100 m T38	Timothy Sullivan; Australia	Mikhail Popov; Russia	Stephen Payton; Great Britain
100 m T42	Earle Connor; Canada	Lukas Christen; Switzerland	Andriy Danylov; Ukraine
100 m T44	Marlon Shirley; United States	Brian Frasure; United States	Neil Fuller; Australia
100 m T46	Elliot Mujaji; Zimbabwe	Haichen Liang; China	Tim Matthews; Australia
100 m T52	Paul Nitz; United States	Salvador Hernandez; Mexico	André Beaudoin; Canada
100 m T53	John Lindsay; Australia	Sopa Intasen; Thailand	Hamad Aladwani; Kuwait
100 m T54	Geoff Trappett; Australia	Hakan Ericsson; Sweden	David Holding; Great Britain
200 m T11	Enrique Sanchez-Guijo; Spain	Firmino Baptista; Portugal	Júlio Requena; Spain
200 m T12	Gabriel Potra; Portugal	Li Qiang; China	Igor Pashchenko; Ukraine
200 m T13	Nathan Meyer; South Africa	André Andrade; Brazil	Ricardo Santana; Venezuela
200 m T34	Jason Lachance; Canada	Kazuya Maeba; Japan	Ross Davis; United States
200 m T35	Lloyd Upsdell; Great Britain	Roman Dzyuba; Ukraine	Richard White; Great Britain
200 m T36	Wa Wai So; Hong Kong	Serhiy Norenko; Ukraine	Ahmed Saif Zaal Abu Muhair; United Arab Emirates
200 m T37	Mohamed Allek; Algeria	Matt Slade; New Zealand	Ahmed Hassan Mahmoud; Egypt
200 m T38	Timothy Sullivan; Australia	Mikhail Popov; Russia	Stephen Payton; Great Britain
200 m T42	Lukas Christen; Switzerland	Earle Connor; Canada	Andriy Danylov; Ukraine
200 m T44	Neil Fuller; Australia	Roderick Green; United States	Marcus Ehm; Germany
200 m T46	Sebastien Barc; France	Heath Francis; Australia	Tim Matthews; Australia
200 m T51	Bart Dodson; United States	Mikkel Gaarder; Norway	Alvise De Vidi; Italy
200 m T52	Salvador Hernandez; Mexico	André Beaudoin; Canada	Dean Bergeron; Canada
200 m T53	Pierre Fairbank; France	Christopher Waddell; United States	John Lindsay; Australia
200 m T54	Supachai Koysub; Thailand	Claude Issorat; France	Hakan Ericsson; Sweden
400 m T11	Carlos Lopes; Portugal	Luís Bullido; Spain	Aladji Ba; France
400 m T12	Li Qiang; China	Daniel Wozniak; Poland	Oleg Chepel; Belarus
400 m T13	Royal Mitchell; United States	Riaan Liebenberg; South Africa	José Alves; Portugal
400 m T20	Juan Lopez; Spain	Allan Stuart; Great Britain	Andrew Newell; Australia
400 m T34	Kazuya Maeba; Japan	Jason Lachance; Canada	Ross Davis; United States
400 m T36	Wa Wai So; Hong Kong	Ahmed Saif Zaal Abu Muhair; United Arab Emirates	Serhiy Norenko; Ukraine
400 m T37	Mohamed Allek; Algeria	Ahmed Hassan Mahmoud; Egypt	Lamouri Rahmouni; France
400 m T38	Timothy Sullivan; Australia	Stephen Payton; Great Britain	Malcolm Pringle; South Africa
400 m T44	Neil Fuller; Australia	Marcus Ehm; Germany	Roderick Green; United States
400 m T46	Heath Francis; Australia	Antônio Souza; Brazil	Danny Crates; Great Britain
400 m T51	Fabian Blattman; Australia	Alvise De Vidi; Italy	Bart Dodson; United States
400 m T52	Salvador Hernandez; Mexico	Naseib Obaid Sebait Araidat; United Arab Emirates	Dean Bergeron; Canada
400 m T53	Jung Hoon Moon; South Korea	Pierre Fairbank; France	Charles Tolle; France
400 m T54	Claude Issorat; France	Jeff Adams; Canada	Ernst van Dyk; South Africa
800 m T12	Cesar Carlavilla; Spain	Abel Avila; Spain	Paul Fernand Kra Koffi; Ivory Coast
800 m T13	Maher Bouallegue; Tunisia	Tim Prendergast; New Zealand	Stuart McGregor; Canada
800 m T36	Ivan Hompanera; Spain	Yong Jin Choi; South Korea	Danylo Seredin; Ukraine
800 m T38	Malcolm Pringle; South Africa	Valeriy Stepanskoy; Russia	Stephen Cooper; Great Britain
800 m T44	Danny Andrews; United States	Gilberto Alavez; Mexico	Joseph LeMar; United States
800 m T46	Oumar Basakoulba Kone; Ivory Coast	José Monteiro; Portugal	José Fernandez; Spain
800 m T51	Alvise De Vidi; Italy	Tim Johansson; Sweden	Fabian Blattman; Australia
800 m T52	Greg Smith; Australia	Richard Reelie; Canada	Santiago Sanz; Spain
800 m T53	Heinz Frei; Switzerland	Jun Hiromichi; Japan	Pierre Fairbank; France
800 m T54	Jeff Adams; Canada	Kurt Fearnley; Australia	Saúl Mendoza; Mexico
1500 m T11	Paulo de Almeida Coelho; Portugal	Jason Dunkerley; Canada	Pedro Delgado; Spain
1500 m T12	Cesar Carlavilla; Spain	Darren Westlake; Great Britain	Oscar Serrano; Spain
1500 m T13	Maher Bouallegue; Tunisia	Tim Prendergast; New Zealand	Said Gomez; Panama
1500 m T20	Paul Mitchell; Australia	Ihor Bodnar; Ukraine	Tadeusz Chudzynski; Poland
1500 m T36	Yong Jin Choi; South Korea	Danylo Seredin; Ukraine	Jesús González; Spain
1500 m T37	Andrzej Wrobel; Poland	Dana Zimmerman; United States	Benny Govaerts; Belgium
1500 m T46	Robert De Friese Evans; United States	Emmanuel Lacroix; France	Yanjian Wu; China
1500 m T51	Alvise De Vidi; Italy	Fabian Blattman; Australia	Giuseppe Forni; Switzerland
1500 m T52	Greg Smith; Australia	Per Vesterlund; Sweden	Christoph Etzlstorfer; Austria
1500 m T54	Jeff Adams; Canada	Franz Nietlispach; Switzerland	Robert Figl; Germany
5000 m T11	Henry Wanyoike; Kenya	Robert Matthews; Great Britain	Nicolas Ledezma; Mexico
5000 m T12	Noel Thatcher; Great Britain	Moisés Beristain; Mexico	Diosmany Santana; Cuba
5000 m T13	Maher Bouallegue; Tunisia	Said Gomez; Panama	Kestutis Bartkenas; Lithuania
5000 m T38	Ivan Hompanera; Spain	Benny Govaerts; Belgium	Ales Svehlik; Czech Republic
5000 m T46	Robert De Friese Evans; United States	Javier Conde; Spain	Yanjian Wu; China
5000 m T52	Greg Smith; Australia	Santiago Sanz; Spain	Richard Reelie; Canada
5000 m T54	Prawat Wahoram; Thailand	Alexei Ivanov; Russia	Jeff Adams; Canada
10000 m T11	Robert Matthews; Great Britain	Carlos Amaral Ferreira; Portugal	Tim Willis; United States
10000 m T12	Moisés Beristain; Mexico	Diosmany Santana; Cuba	Noel Thatcher; Great Britain
10000 m T54	Prawat Wahoram; Thailand	Franz Nietlispach; Switzerland	Heinz Frei; Switzerland
Marathon T11	Carlos Amaral Ferreira; Portugal	Robert Matthews; Great Britain	Carlo Durante; Italy
Marathon T12	Waldemar Kikolski; Poland	Stephen Brunt; Great Britain	Moises Beristain; Mexico
Marathon T13	Ildar Pomykalov; Russia	Anton Sluka; Slovakia	Roy Daniell; Australia
Marathon T46	Javier Conde; Spain	Mark Brown; Great Britain	Michael Keohane; United States
Marathon T51	Alvise De Vidi; Italy	Heinrich Koeberle; Germany	Thorsten Oppold; Germany
Marathon T52	Clayton Gerein; Canada	Christoph Etzlstorfer; Austria	Thomas Geierspichler; Austria
Marathon T54	Franz Nietlispach; Switzerland	Krige Schabort; South Africa	Heinz Frei; Switzerland
4 × 100 m relay T13	Italy (ITA); Matteo Tassetti; Aldo Manganaro; Mauro Porpora; Lorenzo Ricci	Japan (JPN); Shigeki Yano; Tadashi Hoshino; Koji Saito; Koichi Takada	Spain (ESP); Juan António Prieto; Enrique Sanchez-Guijo; Juan Viedma; Júlio Requena
4 × 100 m relay T38	Australia (AUS); Darren Thrupp; Adrian Grogan; Kieran Ault-Connell; Timothy Sullivan	Great Britain (GBR); Stephen Payton; Michael Churm; Lloyd Upsdell; Stephen Cooper; Stephen Herbert	Hong Kong (HKG); Wa Wai So; Kwok Pang Chao; Shing Chung Chan; Yiu Cheung Cheung
4 × 100 m relay T46	Australia (AUS); Stephen Wilson; Neil Fuller; Tim Matthews; Heath Francis	France (FRA); Sebastien Barc; Serge Ornem; Dominique Andre; Xavier le Draoullec	Germany (GER); Martin Horn; Georg Meyer; Marcus Ehm; Reinhold Boetzel
4 × 100 m relay T54	Thailand (THA); Sopa Intasen; Supachai Koysub; Ampai Sualuang; Prasitdhi Thongchuen	Australia (AUS); John Lindsay; Paul Nunnari; Kurt Fearnley; Geoff Trappett	Canada (CAN); Jeff Adams; Barry Patriquin; Mathieu Blanchette; Mathieu Parent
4 × 400 m relay T13	Portugal (POR); Carlos Lopes; José Alves; José Gameiro; Gabriel Potra	Spain (ESP); Cesar Carlavilla; Pedro Delgado; Luis Bullido; Ignacio Avila	Belarus (BLR); Viktar Zhukouski; Oleg Chepel; Vasili Shaptsiaboi; Aliaksandr Batsian
4 × 400 m relay T38	Australia (AUS); Darren Thrupp; Adrian Grogan; Kieran Ault-Connell; Timothy Sullivan	France (FRA); Lamouri Rahmouni; Pedro Zamorano; Pierre Francois Corosine; Laurent Escurat	Hong Kong (HKG); Shing Chung Chan; Kwok Pang Chao; Wa Wai So; Yiu Cheung Cheung
4 × 400 m relay T46	Australia (AUS); Tim Matthews; Stephen Wilson; Neil Fuller; Heath Francis	Spain (ESP); José Fernandez; David Barrallo; Juan Martinez; Marcos Francisco Duenas	France (FRA); Sebastien Barc; Xavier Ledraoullec; Emmanuel Lacroix; Dominique Andre
4 × 400 m relay T54	France (FRA); Joel Jeannot; Charles Tolle; Philippe Couprie; Claude Issorat	Thailand (THA); Prasitdhi Thongchuen; Sopa Intasen; Ampai Sualuang; Supachai Koysub	Germany (GER); Steffen Woischnik; Drazen Boric; Ralph Brunner; Robert Figl
Club throw F51	Stephen Miller; Great Britain	Takefumi Anryo; Japan	Ahmed Kamal; Bahrain
Discus throw F11	Alfonso Fidalgo; Spain	Jorge Godoy; Argentina	Willibald Monschein; Austria
Discus throw F12	Russell Short; Australia	Rolandas Urbonas; Lithuania	Yury Buchkou; Belarus
Discus throw F13	Oleksandr Yasynovyy; Ukraine	Hai Tao Sun; China	France Gagne; Canada
Discus throw F33	Christopher Martin; Great Britain	Roman Musil; Czech Republic	Jeffrey Lauterbach; United States
Discus throw F34	Stephen Eaton; Australia	Andreas Mueller; Germany	Dan West; Great Britain
Discus throw F35	Thierry Cibone; France	Kyle Pettey; Canada	Paul Williams; Great Britain
Discus throw F36	Milan Kubala; Czech Republic	Willem Noorduin; Netherlands	Hossein Agha-Barghchi; Iran
Discus throw F37	Robert Chyra; Poland	Tarek Hussein; Egypt	Anderson Santos; Brazil
Discus throw F38	James Shaw; Canada	Roman Kolek; Czech Republic	Brian Harvey; Australia
Discus throw F42	Fanie Lombaard; South Africa	Gino de Keersmaeker; Belgium	Viktar Khilmonchyk; Belarus
Discus throw F44	Shawn Brown; United States	Daniel Greaves; Great Britain	Lutovico Halagahu; France
Discus throw F51	Tom Leahy; Ireland	Ayman Al Heddi; Bahrain	Stephen Miller; Great Britain
Discus throw F52	Ghader Modabber; Iran	Horácio Bascioni; Argentina	Aigars Apinis; Latvia
Discus throw F53	Abdolreza Jokar; Iran	Atef Al-Dousari; Kuwait	Gabriel Diaz de Leon; United States
Discus throw F54	Mokhtar Nourafshan; Iran	Frantisek Purgl; Czech Republic	Gustavo Ariosa; Cuba
Discus throw F55	Martin Němec; Czech Republic	Jacques Martin; Canada	Symeon Paltsanitidis; Greece
Discus throw F56	Mohammad Sadeghi Mehryar; Iran	Dariush Namvar; Iran	Joseph Christmas; United States
Discus throw F57	Aref Khosravinia; Iran	Ibrahim Ali; Egypt	Hossam Abd Ellatif; Egypt
Discus throw F58	Mahmoud Elatar; Egypt	Metawa Abou Elkhair; Egypt	Tahar Lachheb; Tunisia
High jump F12	Ruslan Sivitski; Belarus	Leszek Reut; Poland	Oleg Chepel; Belarus
High jump F20	Wissam Ben Bahri; Tunisia	Parashos Stogiannidis; Greece	Hein Seyerling; South Africa
High jump F42	Bin Hou; China	Wei Zhong Guo; China	Gunther Belitz; Germany
High jump F46	Yancong Wu; China	Marlon Shirley; United States	David Roos; South Africa
Javelin throw F11	Siegmund Hegeholz; Germany	Rayk Haucke; Germany	Mineho Ozaki; Japan
Javelin throw F12	Miroslaw Pych; Poland	Aliaksandr Tryputs; Belarus	Heindrich Swanepol; Great Britain
Javelin throw F13	Chih Chung Chiang; Chinese Taipei	France Gagne; Canada	Hai Tao Sun; China
Javelin throw F20	Anton Flavel; Australia	Jesús Lucero; Mexico	Parashos Stogiannidis; Greece
Javelin throw F33	Roman Musil; Czech Republic	Christopher Martin; Great Britain	Ahmad Makhseed; Kuwait
Javelin throw F35	Thierry Cibone; France	Sergiy Kolos; Ukraine	Paul Williams; Great Britain
Javelin throw F37	Ken Churchill; Great Britain	Kobus Jonker; South Africa	Jacek Przebierala; Poland
Javelin throw F42	Jakob Mathiasen; Denmark	Fanie Lombaard; South Africa	Vahab Saalabi; Iran
Javelin throw F44	John Dowall; New Zealand	Si Lao Ha; China	Joerg Frischmann; Germany
Javelin throw F46	Sven Solbrig; Germany	Dai Chen Wang; China	Joerg Schiedek; Germany
Javelin throw F52	David MacCalman; New Zealand	Humaid Hassan Murad Eisa; United Arab Emirates	Ghader Modabber; Iran
Javelin throw F53	Adrian Paz; Mexico	Mauro Maximo; Mexico	Abdolreza Jokar; Iran
Javelin throw F54	Avaz Azmoudeh; Iran	Gustavo Ariosa; Cuba	Rauno Saunavaara; Finland
Javelin throw F55	Thomas Bradal; Denmark	Mikael Saleva; Finland	Janez Roškar; Slovenia
Javelin throw F56	Rene Nielsen; Denmark	Josef Stiak; Czech Republic	Joseph Christmas; United States
Javelin throw F57	Mohammad Reza Mirzaei; Iran	Rostislav Pohlmann; Czech Republic	Ibrahim Ali; Egypt
Javelin throw F58	Mahmoud Elatar; Egypt	El Sayed Moussa; Egypt	Hany Elbehiry; Egypt
Long jump F11	Athanasios Barakas; Greece	José Manuel Rodríguez; Spain	Li Duan; China
Long jump F12	Stephane Bozzolo; France	Igor Gorbenko; Ukraine	Joerg Trippen-Hilgers; Germany
Long jump F13	Enrique Cepeda; Cuba	Ivan Kytsenko; Ukraine	Armands Lizbovskis; Latvia
Long jump F20	José Antonio Exposito; Spain	Wissam Ben Bahri; Tunisia	Sandor Ponyori; Hungary
Long jump F37	Fares Hamdi; Tunisia	Jaco Janse van Vuuren; South Africa	Rene Schramm; Germany
Long jump F42	Lukas Christen; Switzerland	John Register; United States	Victor Goeransson; Sweden
Long jump F44	Urs Kolly; Switzerland	Franck Barre; France	Roderick Green; United States
Long jump F46	Hongwei Zhang; China	Anton Skachkov; Ukraine	Yogev Kenzi; Israel
Shot put F11	David Casinos; Spain	Alfonso Fidalgo; Spain	Willibald Monschein; Austria
Shot put F12	Russell Short; Australia	Íñigo García; Spain	Yury Buchkou; Belarus
Shot put F13	Hai Tao Sun; China	Oleksandr Yasynovyy; Ukraine	Jonathan Ward; Great Britain
Shot put F20	Krzysztof Kaczmarek; Poland	Mohamed Ali Fatnassi; Tunisia	Murray Goldfinch; Australia
Shot put F33	Roman Musil; Czech Republic	Evangelos Bakolas; Greece	Ahmad Makhseed; Kuwait
Shot put F35	Thierry Cibone; France	Kyle Pettey; Canada	Paul Williams; Great Britain
Shot put F36	Wolfgang Dubin; Austria	Willem Noorduin; Netherlands	Alex Hermans; Belgium
Shot put F37	Gert van der Merwe; South Africa	Franjo Izlakar; Slovenia	Abbas Mohseni; Iran
Shot put F42	Fanie Lombaard; South Africa	Viktar Khilmonchyk; Belarus	Thierry Daubresse; Belgium
Shot put F44	Lutovico Halagahu; France	John Dowall; New Zealand	Joerg Frischmann; Germany
Shot put F52	Ghader Modabber; Iran	Douglas Heir; United States	Aigars Apinis; Latvia
Shot put F53	Peter Martin; New Zealand	Mauro Maximo; Mexico	Husam Azzam; Palestine
Shot put F54	Mokhtar Nourafshan; Iran	Bruce Wallrodt; Australia	Francisco Jesus Mendez; Spain
Shot put F55	Stefanos Anargyrou; Greece	Martin Němec; Czech Republic	Ulrich Iser; Germany
Shot put F56	Krzysztof Smorszczewski; Poland	Rene Nielsen; Denmark	Gerhard Wies; Germany
Shot put F57	Michael Louwrens; South Africa	Maurizio Nalin; Italy	Alexis Pizarro; Puerto Rico
Shot put F58	Ibrahim Mahmoud Allam; Egypt	Hany Elbehiry; Egypt	Majed Al-Mutairi; Kuwait
Triple jump F11	José Manuel Rodríguez; Spain	Li Duan; China	Viktar Zhukouski; Belarus
Triple jump F12	Wentao Huang; China	Ruslan Sivitski; Belarus	Igor Gorbenko; Ukraine
Triple jump F46	Hongwei Zhang; China	Anton Skachkov; Ukraine	Ruben Alvarez; Spain
Pentathlon P11	Sergey Sevostianov; Russia	Oleksandr Ivanyukhin; Ukraine	Rayk Haucke; Germany
Pentathlon P12	Miroslaw Pych; Poland	Stephane Bozzolo; France	Vadym Kalmykov; Ukraine
Pentathlon P13	Kurt van Raefelghem; Belgium	Lee Cox; Australia	Norbert Holik; Slovakia
Pentathlon P42	Fanie Lombaard; South Africa	Jakob Mathiasen; Denmark	Horst Beyer; Germany
Pentathlon P44	Urs Kolly; Switzerland	Thomas Bourgeois; United States	Don Elgin; Australia
Pentathlon P53	David MacCalman; New Zealand	Paolo D'Agostini; Italy	Peter Martin; New Zealand
Pentathlon P58	Ali Ghribi; Tunisia	Robert Balk; United States	Rene Nielsen; Denmark

=== Women's events ===
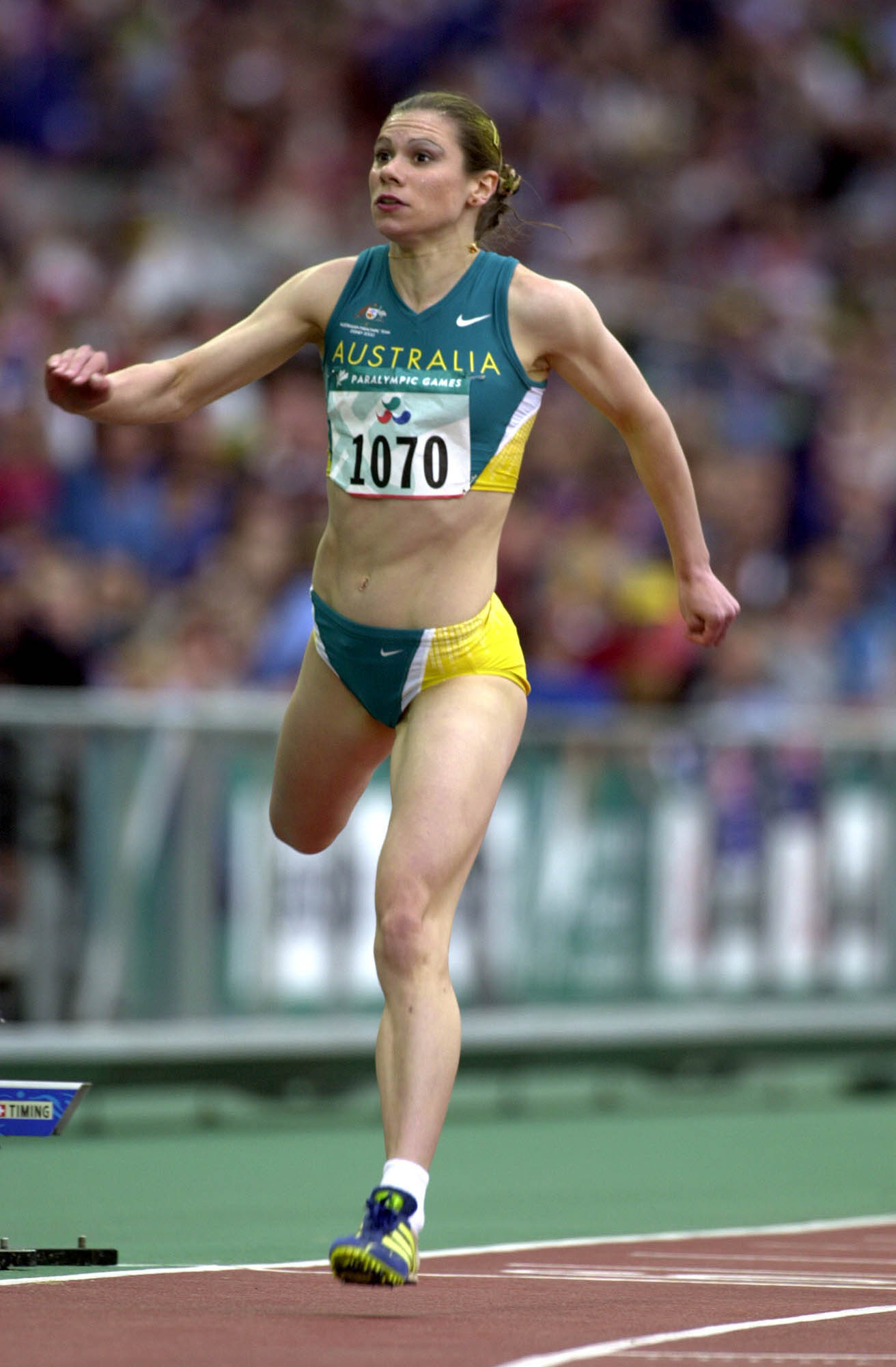
Action shot of Australian track athlete Lisa Llorens during her silver medal winning run in the 100 m T20 at the 2000 Summer Paralympics

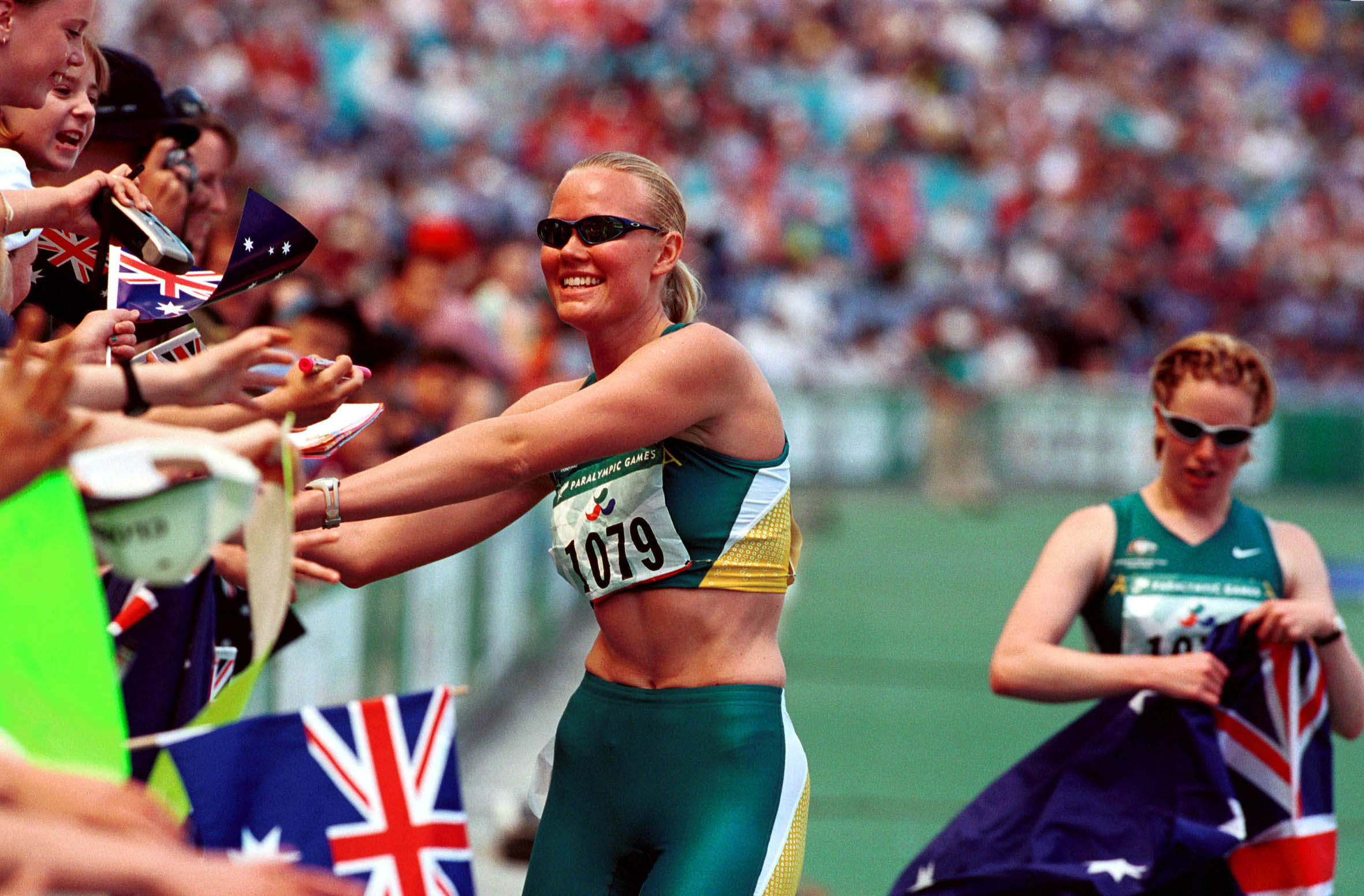
Australian track athletes Katrina Webb (left) and Alison Quinn (right) celebrate with their Australian fans in the crowd over their medal wins in the 100 m T38 at the 2000 Sydney Paralympic Games, Day 07. Quinn won gold and Webb won silver in this event.

Event	Gold	Silver	Bronze
100 m T12	Ádria Santos; Brazil	Purificacion Santamarta; Spain	Beatriz Mendoza; Spain
100 m T20	Małgorzata Kleemann; Poland	Lisa Llorens; Australia	Elisabel Delgado; Argentina
100 m T34	Noriko Arai; Japan	Rebecca Feldman; Australia	Deborah Brennan; Great Britain
100 m T36	Hazel Robson; Great Britain	Caroline Innes; Great Britain	Chun Lai Yu; Hong Kong
100 m T37	Lisa McIntosh; Australia	Isabelle Foerder; Germany	Evelyne Khatsembula; Kenya
100 m T38	Alison Quinn; Australia	Katrina Webb; Australia	Inna Dyachenko; Ukraine
100 m T44	Shea Cowart; United States	Sabine Wagner; Germany	Juan Wang; China
100 m T46	Amy Winters; Australia	Anna Szymul; Poland	Iryna Leantsiuk; Belarus
100 m T52	Ursina Greuter; Switzerland	Lisa Franks; Canada	Florence Gossiaux; France
100 m T53	Tanni Grey-Thompson; Great Britain	Cheri Blauwet; United States	Francesca Porcellato; Italy
100 m T54	Cheri Becerra; United States	Chantal Petitclerc; Canada	Yvonne Sehmisch; Germany
200 m T11	Ádria Santos; Brazil	Maria Ligorio; Italy	Tracey Hinton; Great Britain
200 m T12	Volha Shuliakouskaya; Belarus	Beatriz Mendoza; Spain	Elena Zhdanova; Russia
200 m T20	Lisa Llorens; Australia	Sharon Rackham; Australia	Tracey Melesko; Canada
200 m T34	Deborah Brennan; Great Britain	Noriko Arai; Japan	Rebecca Feldman; Australia
200 m T36	Caroline Innes; Great Britain	Eleni Samaritaki; Greece	Chun Lai Yu; Hong Kong
200 m T38	Lisa McIntosh; Australia	Alison Quinn; Australia	Katrina Webb; Australia
200 m T44	Shea Cowart; United States	Sabine Wagner; Germany	Juan Wang; China
200 m T46	Amy Winters; Australia	Lioubov Vassilieva; Russia	Anna Szymul; Poland
200 m T52	Lisa Franks; Canada	Teruyo Tanaka; Japan	Miki Yoda; Japan
200 m T53	Tanni Grey-Thompson; Great Britain	Madelene Nordlund; Sweden	Cheri Blauwet; United States
200 m T54	Chantal Petitclerc; Canada	Cheri Becerra; United States	Yvonne Sehmisch; Germany
400 m T11	Purificación Santamarta; Spain	Ádria Santos; Brazil	Tracey Hinton; Great Britain
400 m T34	Rebecca Feldman; Australia	Mary Rice; Ireland	Caitlin Renneson; Canada
400 m T36	Caroline Innes; Great Britain	Eleni Samaritaki; Greece	Chun Lai Yu; Hong Kong
400 m T38	Lisa McIntosh; Australia	Katrina Webb; Australia	Maria Fernandes; Portugal
400 m T46	Lioubov Vassilieva; Russia	Anna Szymul; Poland	Amy Winters; Australia
400 m T52	Lisa Franks; Canada	Ursina Greuter; Switzerland	Miki Yoda; Japan
400 m T53	Tanni Grey-Thompson; Great Britain	Madelene Nordlund; Sweden	Cheri Blauwet; United States
400 m T54	Cheri Becerra; United States	Chantal Petitclerc; Canada	Sofia Dettmann; Sweden
800 m T12	Rima Batalova; Russia	Tracey Hinton; Great Britain	Victoria Chernova; Russia
800 m T20	Barbara Bieganowska; Poland	Arleta Meloch; Poland	Trish Flavel; Australia
800 m T52	Lisa Franks; Canada	Teruyo Tanaka; Japan	Ursina Greuter; Switzerland
800 m T53	Tanni Grey-Thompson; Great Britain	Jessica Galli; United States	Cheri Blauwet; United States
800 m T54	Chantal Petitclerc; Canada	Louise Sauvage; Australia	Ariadne Hernandez; Mexico
1500 m T12	Rima Batalova; Russia	Claudia Meier; Germany	Pamela McGonigle; United States
1500 m T52	Lisa Franks; Canada	Teruyo Tanaka; Japan	Anna Tavano; France
1500 m T54	Louise Sauvage; Australia	Jean Driscoll; United States	Ariadne Hernandez; Mexico
5000 m T12	Rima Batalova; Russia	Claudia Meier; Germany	Victoria Chernova; Russia
5000 m T54	Louise Sauvage; Australia	Ariadne Hernandez; Mexico	Jean Driscoll; United States
Marathon T54	Jean Driscoll; United States	Kazu Hatanaka; Japan	Wakako Tsuchida; Japan
Discus throw F12	Hong Yan Xu; China	Lisa Banta; United States	Jodi Willis-Roberts; Australia
Discus throw F13	Liudys Masso; Cuba	Tamara Sivakova; Belarus	Asya Miller; United States
Discus throw F33-34	Birgit Pohl; Germany	Janice Lawton; Great Britain	Tanya Swanepoel; South Africa
Discus throw F37	Christelle Bosker; South Africa	Vladimira Bujarkova; Czech Republic	Jane Mandean; South Africa
Discus throw F46	Hong Ping Wu; China	Jennifer Barrett; United States	Britta Jaenicke; Germany
Discus throw F51-54	Martina Kniezkova; Czech Republic	Zanele Situ; South Africa	Dora Garcia; Mexico
Discus throw F58	Roseane Santos; Brazil	Khadija Jaballah; Tunisia	Karima Feleifal; Egypt
High jump F20	Lisa Llorens; Australia	Kazumi Sakai; Japan	Sirly Tiik; Estonia
Javelin throw F20	Sirly Tiik; Estonia	Norma Koplick; Australia	Susana Echeverria; Spain
Javelin throw F37	Christelle Bosker; South Africa	Pauline Latto; Great Britain	Claudia Rut Vignatti; Argentina
Javelin throw F44	Juan Yao; China	Andrea Scherney; Austria	Tatiana Mezinova; Russia
Javelin throw F46	Natalia Goudkova; Russia	Hong Ping Wu; China	Jessica Sachse; Germany
Javelin throw F52-54	Zanele Situ; South Africa	Martina Kniezkova; Czech Republic	Dora Garcia; Mexico
Javelin throw F58	Edith Nzuruike; Nigeria	Mary Nakhumicha; Kenya	Zakia Abdin; Egypt
Long jump F12	Rosalia Lazaro; Spain	Aksana Sivitskaya; Belarus	Volha Shuliakouskaya; Belarus
Long jump F20	Lisa Llorens; Australia	Ka Yan Tsang; Hong Kong	Maria Orsos; Hungary
Long jump F46	Catherine Bader-Bille; Germany	Iryna Leantsiuk; Belarus	Haiying Xiao; China
Shot put F12	Jodi Willis-Roberts; Australia	Hong Yan Xu; China	Siena Christen; Germany
Shot put F20	Ewa Durska; Poland	Joanna Gad; Poland	Sirly Tiik; Estonia
Shot put F33-34	Tiina Ala-Aho; Finland	Tanya Swanepoel; South Africa	Laura Ann Terry; United States
Shot put F37	Joanne Bradshaw; Australia	Simona Kegel; Germany	Christelle Bosker; South Africa
Shot put F44	Michaela Daamen; Germany	Andrea Scherney; Austria	Tatiana Mezinova; Russia
Shot put F46	Britta Jaenicke; Germany	Hong Ping Wu; China	Jennifer Barrett; United States
Shot put F52-54	Sally Reddin; Great Britain	Dora Garcia; Mexico	Evelyn Schmied; Austria
Shot put F55	Marianne Buggenhagen; Germany	Lynda Holt; Australia	Dragica Lapornik; Slovenia
Shot put F57	Ivanka Koleva; Bulgaria	Martina Willing; Germany	Mary Nakhumicha; Kenya
Shot put F58	Roseane Santos; Brazil	Khadija Jaballah; Tunisia	Mervat Omar; Egypt
Pentathlon P13	Olga Semenova; Russia	Courtney Knight; Canada	Catherine Walsh; Ireland

== See also ==
- Athletics at the 2000 Summer Olympics
