= South Africa at the 2000 Summer Paralympics =

- IPC code: RSA
- NPC: South African Sports Confederation and Olympic Committee
- Website: www.sascoc.co.za

in Sydney
- Competitors: 64 (50 male, 14 female)
- Medals Ranked 13th: Gold 13 Silver 12 Bronze 13 Total 38

Summer Paralympics appearances (overview)
- 1964; 1968; 1972; 1976; 1980–1988; 1992; 1996; 2000; 2004; 2008; 2012; 2016; 2020; 2024

There were 14 female and 50 male athletes representing the country at the 2000 Summer Paralympics and finished 13th on the medal table.

== Medal table ==
Medal	Name	Sport	Event
Gold	Nathan Meyer	Athletics	Men's 100m T13
Gold	Nathan Meyer	Athletics	Men's 200m T13
Gold	Malcolm Pringle	Athletics	Men's 800m T38
Gold	Fanie Lombaard	Athletics	Men's discus F42
Gold	Gert van der Merwe	Athletics	Men's shot put F37
Gold	Fanie Lombaard	Athletics	Men's shot put F42
Gold	Michael Louwrens	Athletics	Men's shot put F57
Gold	Fanie Lombaard	Athletics	Men's pentathlon P42
Gold	Christelle Bosker	Athletics	Women's discus F37
Gold	Christelle Bosker	Athletics	Women's javelin F37
Gold	Zanele Situ	Athletics	Women's javelin F52-54
Gold	Ebert Kleynhans	Swimming	Men's 50m freestyle S12
Gold	Ebert Kleynhans	Swimming	Men's 100m freestyle S12
Silver	Riaan Liebenberg	Athletics	Men's 400m T13
Silver	Krige Schabort	Athletics	Men's marathon T54
Silver	Kobus Jonker	Athletics	Men's javelin F37
Silver	Fanie Lombaard	Athletics	Men's javelin F42
Silver	Jaco Janse van Vuuren	Athletics	Men's long jump F37
Silver	Zanele Situ	Athletics	Women's discus F51-54
Silver	Tanya Swanepoel	Athletics	Women's shot put F33-34
Silver	Hannes Venter	Swimming	Men's 50m freestyle S10
Silver	Scott Field	Swimming	Men's 50m freestyle S13
Silver	Tadhg Slattery	Swimming	Men's 100m breaststroke SB5
Silver	Scott Field	Swimming	Men's 100m freestyle S13
Silver	Tadhg Slattery	Swimming	Men's 200m individual medley SM6
Bronze	Malcolm Pringle	Athletics	Men's 400m T38
Bronze	Ernst van Dyk	Athletics	Men's 400m T54
Bronze	Hein Seyerling	Athletics	Men's high jump F20
Bronze	David Roos	Athletics	Men's high jump F46
Bronze	Tanya Swanepoel	Athletics	Women's discus F33-34
Bronze	Jane Mandean	Athletics	Women's discus F37
Bronze	Christelle Bosker	Athletics	Women's shot put F37
Bronze	Marius Louw	Cycling	Mixed bicycle time trial CP div 3
Bronze	Moekie Grobbelaar	Powerlifting	Women's -56 kg
Bronze	Craig Groenewald	Swimming	Men's 50m freestyle S14
Bronze	Hannes Venter	Swimming	Men's 100m breaststroke SB9
Bronze	Scott Field	Swimming	Men's 100m butterfly S13
Bronze	Craig Groenewald	Swimming	Men's 200m freestyle S14

== See also ==
- South Africa at the 2000 Summer Olympics
- South Africa at the Paralympics

== Bibliography ==
- International Paralympic Committee (2000). "Appendix C: Athlete Numbers - By Delegation". Sydney 2000 Paralympic Games Post Games Report. Sydney.
