= Tunisia at the 2000 Summer Paralympics =

- IPC code: TUN
- NPC: Tunisian Paralympic Committee

in Sydney
- Competitors: 10 (8 male, 2 female) in 1 sport
- Medals Ranked 27th: Gold 6 Silver 4 Bronze 1 Total 11

Summer Paralympics appearances (overview)
- 1988; 1992; 1996; 2000; 2004; 2008; 2012; 2016; 2020; 2024

Tunisia competed at the 2000 Summer Paralympics in Sydney, Australia from August 29 to September 9, 2000.[1] This was the nation's fourth appearance at the Summer Paralympics since 1988. The Tunisian Paralympic Committee sent a total of 10 athletes to the Games, 8 men and 2 women to compete in Athletics only. Tunisia left Sydney with a total of 11 Paralympic medals ( 6 gold, 4 silver and 1 bronze ).

== Medal table ==
Medal	Name	Sport	Event
Gold	Maher Bouallegue	Athletics	Men's 800m T13
Gold	Maher Bouallegue	Athletics	Men's 1500m T13
Gold	Maher Bouallegue	Athletics	Men's 5000m T13
Gold	Wissam Ben Bahri	Athletics	Men's high jump F20
Gold	Fares Hamdi	Athletics	Men's long jump F37
Gold	Ali Ghribi	Athletics	Men's pentathlon P58
Silver	Wissam Ben Bahri	Athletics	Men's long jump F20
Silver	Mohamed Ali Fatnassi	Athletics	Men's shot put F20
Silver	Khadija Jaballah	Athletics	Women's discus F58
Silver	Khadija Jaballah	Athletics	Women's shot put F58
Bronze	Tahar Lachheb	Athletics	Men's discus F58

== See also ==
- Tunisia at the 2000 Summer Olympics
- Tunisia at the Paralympics

== Bibliography ==
- International Paralympic Committee (2000). "Appendix C: Athlete Numbers - By Delegation". Sydney 2000 Paralympic Games Post Games Report. Sydney.
