= Russia at the 2000 Summer Paralympics =

- IPC code: RUS
- NPC: Russian Paralympic Committee
- Website: www.paralymp.ru (in Russian)

in Sydney
- Competitors: 89
- Medals Ranked 14th: Gold 12 Silver 11 Bronze 12 Total 35

Summer Paralympics appearances (overview)
- 1996; 2000; 2004; 2008; 2012; 2016–2024

Other related appearances
- Soviet Union (1988); Unified Team (1992); RPC (2020)

Russia competed at the 2000 Summer Paralympics in Sydney, Australia. 89 competitors from Russia won 35 medals, including 12 gold, 11 silver and 12 bronze to finish 14th in the medal table.

== Medal table ==
=== Medallists ===
Medal	Name	Sport	Event
Gold	Ildar Pomykalov	Athletics	Men's marathon T13
Gold	Sergey Sevostianov	Athletics	Men's pentathlon P11
Gold	Lioubov Vassilieva	Athletics	Women's 400m T46
Gold	Rima Batalova	Athletics	Women's 800m T12
Gold	Rima Batalova	Athletics	Women's 1500m T12
Gold	Rima Batalova	Athletics	Women's 5000m T12
Gold	Natalia Goudkova	Athletics	Women's javelin F46
Gold	Olga Semenova	Athletics	Women's pentathlon P13
Gold	Alexey Shemanin; Marat Fatiakhdinov; Alexei Silatchev; Mamuka Dzimistarishvili; Victor Morozov; Alexei Toumakov; Pavel Sizov; Mikhail Brednev; Nikolan Korenkov; Andrey Lozhechnikov; Sergey Khryashev	Football 7-a-side	Men's team
Gold	Tamara Popdalnaia	Powerlifting	Women's -52 kg
Gold	Andrey Strokin	Swimming	Men's 50m freestyle S13
Gold	Andrey Strokin	Swimming	Men's 100m freestyle S13
Silver	Mikhail Popov	Athletics	Men's 100m T38
Silver	Mikhail Popov	Athletics	Men's 200m T38
Silver	Valeriy Stepanskoy	Athletics	Men's 800m T38
Silver	Alexei Ivanov	Athletics	Men's 5000m T54
Silver	Lioubov Vassilieva	Athletics	Women's 200m T46
Silver	Veniamin Mitchourine	Judo	Men's -60 kg
Silver	Grigori Shneyderman	Judo	Men's -100 kg
Silver	Dmitriy Ivanov	Swimming	Men's 100m breaststroke SB13
Silver	Albert Bakaev	Swimming	Men's 100m freestyle S3
Silver	Yulia Nikitina	Swimming	Women's 100m breaststroke SB9
Bronze	Elena Zhdanova	Athletics	Women's 200m T12
Bronze	Victoria Chernova	Athletics	Women's 800m T12
Bronze	Victoria Chernova	Athletics	Women's 5000m T12
Bronze	Tatiana Mezinova	Athletics	Women's javelin F44
Bronze	Tatiana Mezinova	Athletics	Women's shot put F44
Bronze	Oleg Chabachov	Judo	Men's -66 kg
Bronze	Andrey Lebedinsky	Shooting	Mixed sport pistol SH1
Bronze	Albert Bakaev	Swimming	Men's 50m backstroke S3
Bronze	Albert Bakaev	Swimming	Men's 50m freestyle S3
Bronze	Roman Kiselev; Alexei Grichaev; Vadim Grankin; Maxim Egorov	Swimming	Men's 4 × 100 m freestyle relay S14
Bronze	Natalia Popova	Swimming	Women's 50m backstroke S4
Bronze	Olga Sokolova	Swimming	Women's 200m individual medley SM11

== See also ==
- Russia at the Paralympics
- Russia at the 2000 Summer Olympics
