= Ukraine at the 2000 Summer Paralympics =

- IPC code: UKR
- NPC: National Sports Committee for the Disabled of Ukraine
- Website: www.paralympic.org.ua

in Sydney
- Competitors: 67
- Medals Ranked 35th: Gold 3 Silver 20 Bronze 14 Total 37

Summer Paralympics appearances (overview)
- 1996; 2000; 2004; 2008; 2012; 2016; 2020; 2024

Other related appearances
- Soviet Union (1988); Unified Team (1992)

Ukraine sent a delegation of athletes to the 2000 Summer Paralympics. It won 3 gold, 20 silver and 14 bronze medals.

== Medal table ==
Medal	Name	Sport	Event
Gold	Oleksandr Yasynovyy	Athletics	Men's discus F13
Gold	Yuriy Andryushin	Swimming	Men's 50m butterfly S7
Gold	Oleksandr Mashchenko	Swimming	Men's 100m breaststroke SB11
Silver	Serhiy Atamanenko	Archery	Men's individual standing
Silver	Igor Pashchenko	Athletics	Men's 100m T12
Silver	Roman Dzyuba	Athletics	Men's 100m T35
Silver	Serhiy Norenko	Athletics	Men's 100m T36
Silver	Roman Dzyuba	Athletics	Men's 200m T35
Silver	Serhiy Norenko	Athletics	Men's 200m T36
Silver	Ihor Bodnar	Athletics	Men's 1500m T20
Silver	Danylo Seredin	Athletics	Men's 1500m T36
Silver	Sergiy Kolos	Athletics	Men's javelin F35
Silver	Igor Gorbenko	Athletics	Men's long jump F12
Silver	Ivan Kytsenko	Athletics	Men's long jump F13
Silver	Anton Skachkov	Athletics	Men's long jump F46
Silver	Oleksandr Yasynovyy	Athletics	Men's shot put F13
Silver	Anton Skachkov	Athletics	Men's triple jump F46
Silver	Oleksandr Ivanyukhin	Athletics	Men's pentathlon P11
Silver	Yevhen Zhuchynin; Mykola Kovalskyy; Volodymyr Kabanov; Serhiy Vakulenko; Andriy Roztoka; Andriy Tsukanov; Valeriy Novopoltsev; Ihor Lytvynenko; Taras Dutko; Sergiy Krot; Sergiy Babiy	Football 7-a-side	Men's team
Silver	Lidiya Solovyova	Powerlifting	Women's -40kg
Silver	Olena Akopyan	Swimming	Women's 50m freestyle S5
Silver	Olena Akopyan	Swimming	Women's 100m freestyle S5
Silver	Olena Akopyan	Swimming	Women's 200m freestyle S5
Bronze	Oleksandr Ivanyukhin	Athletics	Men's 100m T11
Bronze	Andriy Zhyltsov	Athletics	Men's 100m T36
Bronze	Andriy Danylov	Athletics	Men's 100m T42
Bronze	Igor Pashchenko	Athletics	Men's 200m T12
Bronze	Andriy Danylov	Athletics	Men's 200m T42
Bronze	Serhiy Norenko	Athletics	Men's 400m T36
Bronze	Danylo Seredin	Athletics	Men's 800m T36
Bronze	Igor Gorbenko	Athletics	Men's triple jump F12
Bronze	Vadym Kalmykov	Athletics	Men's pentathlon P12
Bronze	Inna Dyachenko	Athletics	Women's 100m T38
Bronze	Lyudmyla Osmanova	Powerlifting	Women's -60kg
Bronze	Ruslan Burlakov	Swimming	Men's 50m freestyle S11
Bronze	Ruslan Burlakov	Swimming	Men's 100m freestyle S11
Bronze	Nataliya Ivanova	Table tennis	Women's singles 11

== See also ==
- Ukraine at the Paralympics
- Ukraine at the 2000 Summer Olympics
