= France at the 2000 Summer Paralympics =

- IPC code: FRA
- NPC: French Paralympic and Sports Committee
- Website: france-paralympique.fr

in Sydney
- Competitors: 140 (110 on foot, 30 on wheelchairs)
- Medals Ranked 7th: Gold 30 Silver 28 Bronze 28 Total 86

Summer Paralympics appearances (overview)
- 1960; 1964; 1968; 1972; 1976; 1980; 1984; 1988; 1992; 1996; 2000; 2004; 2008; 2012; 2016; 2020; 2024

There were 30 on wheelchairs and 110 on foot athletes representing the country at the 2000 Summer Paralympics.

== Medal table ==
Medal	Name	Sport	Event
Gold	Sebastien Barc	Athletics	Men's 200m T46
Gold	Pierre Fairbank	Athletics	Men's 200m T53
Gold	Claude Issorat	Athletics	Men's 400m T54
Gold	Joel Jeannot; Charles Tolle; Philippe Couprie; Claude Issorat	Athletics	Men's 4x400m relay T54
Gold	Thierry Cibone	Athletics	Men's discus F35
Gold	Thierry Cibone	Athletics	Men's javelin F35
Gold	Stephane Bozzolo	Athletics	Men's long jump F12
Gold	Thierry Cibone	Athletics	Men's shot put F35
Gold	Lutovico Halagahu	Athletics	Men's shot put F44
Gold	Bernard Champenois	Cycling	Mixed bicycle road race LC3
Gold	Gaetan Dautresire	Swimming	Men's 200m freestyle S3
Gold	Eric Lindmann	Swimming	Men's 200m individual medley SM7
Gold	Béatrice Hess	Swimming	Women's 50m backstroke S5
Gold	Béatrice Hess	Swimming	Women's 50m butterfly S5
Gold	Béatrice Hess	Swimming	Women's 50m freestyle S5
Gold	Béatrice Hess	Swimming	Women's 100m freestyle S5
Gold	Béatrice Hess	Swimming	Women's 200m freestyle S5
Gold	Béatrice Hess	Swimming	Women's 200m individual medley SM6
Gold	Anne Cecile Lequien; Virgine Triper-Martheau; Béatrice Hess; Ludivine Loiseau	Swimming	Women's 4x50m medley relay 20pts
Gold	Jean-Philippe Robin	Table tennis	Men's singles 3
Gold	Christophe Durand	Table tennis	Men's singles 5
Gold	Michel Peeters; Jean-Philippe Robin; Pascal Verger	Table tennis	Men's teams 3
Gold	Bruno Benedetti; Emeric Martin; Christophe Pinna	Table tennis	Men's teams 4
Gold	Olivier Chateigner; Francois Serignat; Gilles de la Bourdonnaye	Table tennis	Men's teams 10
Gold	Thu Kamkasomphou	Table tennis	Women's singles 9
Gold	Isabelle Lafaye Marziou; Stephanie Mariage	Table tennis	Women's teams 1-3
Gold	Jean Rosier	Wheelchair fencing	Men's epée individual B
Gold	Cyril More; Jean Rosier; Christian Lachaud; Robert Citerne	Wheelchair fencing	Men's epée team
Gold	Serge Besseiche; Pascal Durand; Yvon Pacault; Cyril More	Wheelchair fencing	Men's sabre team
Gold	Patricia Picot	Wheelchair fencing	Women's foil individual A
Silver	Olivier Hatem	Archery	Men's individual W1
Silver	Charles Est; Dejan Miladinovic; Olivier Hatem	Archery	Men's teams open
Silver	Claude Issorat	Athletics	Men's 200m T54
Silver	Pierre Fairbank	Athletics	Men's 400m T53
Silver	Emmanuel Lacroix	Athletics	Men's 1500m T46
Silver	Sebastien Barc; Serge Ornem; Dominique Andre; Xavier Ledraoullec	Athletics	Men's 4x100m relay T46
Silver	Lamouri Rahmouni; Pedro Zamorano; Pierre Francois Corosine; Laurent Escurat	Athletics	Men's 4x400m relay T38
Silver	Franck Barre	Athletics	Men's long jump F44
Silver	Stephane Bozzolo	Athletics	Men's pentathlon P12
Silver	Laurent Thirionet	Cycling	Mixed bicycle road race LC3
Silver	Bernard Champenois; Patrick Ceria; Francis Trujillo	Cycling	Mixed team Olympic sprint LC1-3
Silver	Sebastien Le Meaux	Judo	Men's -81kg
Silver	Carine Burgy	Powerlifting	Women's +82.5kg
Silver	Gaetan Dautresire	Swimming	Men's 50m backstroke S4
Silver	Pascal Pinard	Swimming	Men's 50m butterfly S5
Silver	Pascal Pinard	Swimming	Men's 100m breaststroke SB4
Silver	Eric Lindmann	Swimming	Men's 100m breaststroke SB6
Silver	Pascal Pinard	Swimming	Men's 200m individual medley SM5
Silver	Anne Cecile Lequien	Swimming	Women's 50m backstroke S4
Silver	Ludivine Loiseau	Swimming	Women's 50m butterfly S6
Silver	Alain Pichon	Table tennis	Men's singles 8
Silver	Jean Yves Abbadie; Stephane Messi	Table tennis	Men's teams 6-7
Silver	Alain Pichon; Michel Schaller; Julien Soyer	Table tennis	Men's teams 8
Silver	Isabelle Lafaye Marziou	Table tennis	Women's singles 1-2
Silver	Bernadette Darvand	Table tennis	Women's singles 6-8
Silver	Michelle Sevin	Table tennis	Women's singles 10
Silver	Cyril More	Wheelchair fencing	Men's sabre individual A
Silver	Sophie Belgodere; Patricia Picot; Murielle van de Cappelle	Wheelchair fencing	Women's foil team
Bronze	Dejan Milandinovic	Archery	Men's individual W1
Bronze	Aladji Ba	Athletics	Men's 400m T11
Bronze	Lamouri Rahmouni	Athletics	Men's 400m T37
Bronze	Charles Tolle	Athletics	Men's 400m T53
Bronze	Pierre Fairbank	Athletics	Men's 800m T53
Bronze	Sebastien Barc; Xavier Ledraoullec; Emmanuel Lacroix; Dominique Andre	Athletics	Men's 4x400m relay T46
Bronze	Lutovico Halagahu	Athletics	Men's discus F44
Bronze	Florence Gossiaux	Athletics	Women's 100m T52
Bronze	Anna Tavano	Athletics	Women's 1500m T52
Bronze	David Mercier	Cycling	Mixed bicycle road race LC1
Bronze	Sebastien Bichon	Cycling	Mixed bicycle road race LC2
Bronze	Gerald Rollo	Judo	Men's -73kg
Bronze	David Guillaume	Judo	Men's -90kg
Bronze	Nicole Michoux	Shooting	Women's sport rifle 3x20 SH1
Bronze	Eric Lacaze	Shooting	Mixed air rifle prone SH2
Bronze	Raphael Voltz	Shooting	Mixed air rifle standing SH2
Bronze	Philippe Revillon	Swimming	Men's 100m freestyle S2
Bronze	Eric Lindmann	Swimming	Men's 400m freestyle S7
Bronze	Ludivine Loiseau	Swimming	Women's 100m backstroke S6
Bronze	Michel Peeters	Table tennis	Men's singles 3
Bronze	Stephane Messi	Table tennis	Men's singles 7
Bronze	Marc Sorabella; Vincent Boury; Erwan Fouillen; Jean Patrick d'Ivoley-Boggs	Table tennis	Men's teams 1-2
Bronze	Martine Thierry	Table tennis	Women's singles 6-8
Bronze	Thu Kamkasomphou; Michelle Sevin; Martine Thierry	Table tennis	Women's teams 6-10
Bronze	Robert Citerne	Wheelchair fencing	Men's foil individual A
Bronze	Pascal Durand	Wheelchair fencing	Men's sabre individual B
Bronze	Sophie Belgodere; Patricia Picot; Murielle van de Cappelle	Wheelchair fencing	Women's epée team
Bronze	Murielle van de Cappelle	Wheelchair fencing	Women's foil individual B

== See also ==
- France at the 2000 Summer Olympics
- France at the Paralympics

== Bibliography ==
- International Paralympic Committee (2000). "Appendix C: Athlete Numbers - By Delegation". Sydney 2000 Paralympic Games Post Games Report. Sydney.
