= Cuba at the 2000 Summer Paralympics =

- IPC code: CUB
- NPC: Comité Paralimpico Cubano

in Sydney
- Competitors: 10 (9 male, 1 female) in 2 sports
- Medals Ranked 34th: Gold 4 Silver 2 Bronze 2 Total 8

Summer Paralympics appearances (overview)
- 1992; 1996; 2000; 2004; 2008; 2012; 2016; 2020; 2024

There were 1 female and 9 male athletes representing the country at the 2000 Summer Paralympics. Competitors from Cuba won 8 medals, including 4 golds, 2 silvers, and 2 bronzes to finish ranked 34th.

== Medal table ==
Medal	Name	Sport	Event
Gold	Enrique Cepeda	Athletics	Men's long jump F13
Gold	Liudys Masso	Athletics	Women's discus F13
Gold	Sergio Arturo Perez	Judo	Men's -60 kg
Gold	Rafael Cruz Alonso	Judo	Men's -81 kg
Silver	Diosmany Santana	Athletics	Men's 10000m T12
Silver	Gustavo Ariosa	Athletics	Men's javelin F54
Bronze	Diosmany Santana	Athletics	Men's 5000m T12
Bronze	Gustavo Ariosa	Athletics	Men's discus F54

== See also ==
- Cuba at the 2000 Summer Olympics
- Cuba at the Paralympics

== Bibliography ==
- International Paralympic Committee (2000). "Appendix C: Athlete Numbers - By Delegation". Sydney 2000 Paralympic Games Post Games Report. Sydney.
