= Athletics at the 2000 Summer Paralympics – Men's marathon T12 =

Men's marathon T12 at the XI Paralympic Games
- Paralympic Athletics
- Dates: 29 October 2000
- Competitors: 9 from 8 nations

Medalists
| 1st place, gold medalist(s) | | Waldemar Kikolski | Poland |
| 2nd place, silver medalist(s) | | Stephen Brunt | Great Britain |
| 3rd place, bronze medalist(s) | | Moises Beristain | Mexico |

The Men's marathon T12 was a marathon event in athletics at the 2000 Summer Paralympics, for visually impaired athletes. Polish champion from the 1996 Games Waldemar Kikolski successfully defended his title in a world-record time of 2:33:11. Of the nine starters, six reached the finish line.

== Results ==
| Place | Athlete | Time |
|---|---|---|
| 1 | Waldemar Kikolski (POL) | 2:33:11 |
| 2 | Stephen Brunt (GBR) | 2:34:10 |
| 3 | Moises Beristain (MEX) | 2:36:27 |
| 4 | Tomasz Chmurzyński (POL) | 2:38:41 |
| 5 | Aurélio Santos (BRA) | 2:41:45 |
| 6 | Igor Lisnic (MDA) | 2:56:08 |
| - | Mariano Ruiz (ESP) | dnf |
| - | Kiyoshi Hoshina (JPN) | dsq |
| - | Jambal Lhkagvajav (MGL) | dsq |

== See also ==
- Marathon at the Paralympics
