= Bosker =

Bosker is a surname. Notable people with the surname include:

- Bianca Bosker, American journalist and author
- Christelle Bosker, South African paralympic athlete
- Marcel Bosker (born 1997), Dutch long track speed skater

== See also ==
- Basker, another surname
