= Austria at the 2000 Summer Paralympics =

- IPC code: AUT
- NPC: Austrian Paralympic Committee
- Website: www.oepc.at (in German)

in Sydney
- Competitors: 49 (44 male, 5 female)
- Medals Ranked 39th: Gold 2 Silver 7 Bronze 6 Total 15

Summer Paralympics appearances (overview)
- 1960; 1964; 1968; 1972; 1976; 1980; 1984; 1988; 1992; 1996; 2000; 2004; 2008; 2012; 2016; 2020; 2024

There were 5 female and 44 male athletes representing the country at the 2000 Summer Paralympics.

== Medal table ==
| Medal | Name | Sport | Event |
|---|---|---|---|
| Gold | Wolfgang Dubin | Athletics | Men's shot put F36 |
| Gold | Walter Hanl | Judo | Men's -100 kg |
| Silver | Christoph Etzlstorfer | Athletics | Men's marathon T52 |
| Silver | Andrea Scherney | Athletics | Women's javelin F44 |
| Silver | Andrea Scherney | Athletics | Women's shot put F44 |
| Silver | Wolfgang Eibeck | Cycling | Mixed 1 km time trial LC1 |
| Silver | Wolfgang Eibeck | Cycling | Mixed individual pursuit LC1 |
| Silver | Thomas Rosenberger | Swimming | Men's 50m breaststroke SB3 |
| Silver | Stanislaw Fraczyk | Table tennis | Men's singles 9 |
| Bronze | Christoph Etzlstorfer | Athletics | Men's 1500m T52 |
| Bronze | Thomas Geierspichler | Athletics | Men's marathon T52 |
| Bronze | Willibald Monschein | Athletics | Men's discus F11 |
| Bronze | Willibald Monschein | Athletics | Men's shot put F11 |
| Bronze | Evelyn Schmied | Athletics | Women's shot put F52-54 |
| Bronze | Hubert Aufschnaiter | Shooting | Men's air pistol SH1 |

== See also ==
- Austria at the 2000 Summer Olympics
- Austria at the Paralympics

== Bibliography ==
- International Paralympic Committee (2000). "Appendix C: Athlete Numbers - By Delegation". Sydney 2000 Paralympic Games Post Games Report. Sydney.
