= Mexico at the 2000 Summer Paralympics =

- IPC code: MEX
- NPC: Federacion Mexicana de Deporte

in Sydney
- Competitors: 77 (48 on foot, 29 on wheelchairs)
- Medals Ranked 17th: Gold 10 Silver 12 Bronze 12 Total 34

Summer Paralympics appearances (overview)
- 1972; 1976; 1980; 1984; 1988; 1992; 1996; 2000; 2004; 2008; 2012; 2016; 2020; 2024

There were 29 athletes on wheelchairs and 48 athletes on foot representing the country at the 2000 Summer Paralympics.

== Medal table ==
Medal	Name	Sport	Event
Gold	Salvador Hernández	Athletics	Men's 200m T52
Gold	Salvador Hernández	Athletics	Men's 400m T52
Gold	Moisés Beristain	Athletics	Men's 10000m T12
Gold	Adrián Paz Velázquez	Athletics	Men's javelin F53
Gold	Juan Ignacio Reyes	Swimming	Men's 50m backstroke S3
Gold	José Arnulfo Castorena	Swimming	Men's 50m breaststroke SB2
Gold	Juan Ignacio Reyes	Swimming	Men's 150m individual medley SM3
Gold	Doramitzi González	Swimming	Women's 50m freestyle S6
Gold	Doramitzi González	Swimming	Women's 100m backstroke S6
Gold	Patricia Valle	Swimming	Women's 100m freestyle S3
Silver	Salvador Hernández	Athletics	Men's 100m T52
Silver	Gilberto Alavez	Athletics	Men's 800m T44
Silver	Moisés Beristain	Athletics	Men's 5000m T12
Silver	Jesús Lucero	Athletics	Men's javelin F20
Silver	Mauro Máximo de Jesús	Athletics	Men's javelin F53
Silver	Mauro Máximo de Jesús	Athletics	Men's shot put F53
Silver	Ariadne Hernández	Athletics	Women's 5000m T54
Silver	Dora Elia García	Athletics	Women's shot put F52-54
Silver	Amalia Pérez	Powerlifting	Women's -52 kg
Silver	Patricia Barcena	Powerlifting	Women's -75 kg
Silver	Juan Ignacio Reyes	Swimming	Men's 50m butterfly S4
Silver	Doramitzi González	Swimming	Women's 100m freestyle S6
Bronze	Saúl Mendoza	Athletics	Men's 800m T54
Bronze	Nicolás Ledezma	Athletics	Men's 5000m T11
Bronze	Moisés Beristain	Athletics	Men's marathon T12
Bronze	Ariadne Hernández	Athletics	Women's 800m T54
Bronze	Ariadne Hernández	Athletics	Women's 1500m T54
Bronze	Dora Elia García	Athletics	Women's discus F51-54
Bronze	Dora Elia García	Athletics	Women's javelin F52-54
Bronze	Laura Cerero	Powerlifting	Women's -40 kg
Bronze	Patricia Valle	Swimming	Women's 50m breaststroke SB3
Bronze	Doramitzi González	Swimming	Women's 50m butterfly S6
Bronze	Patricia Valle	Swimming	Women's 50m freestyle S3
Bronze	Virginia Hernández	Swimming	Women's 100m freestyle S2

== See also ==
- Mexico at the 2000 Summer Olympics
- Mexico at the Paralympics

== Bibliography ==
- International Paralympic Committee (2000). "Appendix C: Athlete Numbers - By Delegation". Sydney 2000 Paralympic Games Post Games Report. Sydney.
