= Tavano =

Tavano is an Italian surname. Notable people with the surname include:

- Anna Tavano, French Paralympic athlete
- Asya Tavano (born 2002), Italian judoka
- Francesco Tavano (born 1979), Italian footballer
- Salvatore Tavano (born 1980), Italian racing driver
- Fabrizio Tavano (born 1993), Mexican footballer
