= Lachheb =

Lachheb is a surname. Notable people with the surname include:

- Adli Lachheb (born 1987), Tunisian footballer
- Khalid Lachheb (born 1975), French pole vaulter
- Tahar Lachheb, Tunisian paralympic athlete
