= Seredin =

Seredin (Russian: Середин) is a Russian masculine surname derived from the word sreda, meaning Wednesday; its feminine counterpart is Seredina. It may refer to

- Afanasy Seredin-Sabatin (1860–1921), Russian-born architect, steersman-pilot and reporter
- Antonina Seredina (1929–2016), Russian sprint canoer
- Danylo Seredin, Ukrainian paralympic athlete
- Kristina Seredina (born 1994), Russian rugby sevens player
- Sergei Seredin (born 1994), Russian football player
- Yevgeny Seredin (1958–2006), Russian swimmer
