= Óscar Serrano =

Óscar Serrano may refer to:

- Óscar Serrano (athlete) (born 1973), Paralympic athlete from Spain
- Óscar Serrano (tennis) (born 1978), former Spanish tennis player
- Óscar Serrano (footballer) (born 1981), Spanish footballer
