= Belarus at the 2000 Summer Paralympics =

- IPC code: BLR
- NPC: Paralympic Committee of the Republic of Belarus

in Sydney
- Competitors: 22 (15 male, 7 female)
- Medals Ranked 28th: Gold 5 Silver 8 Bronze 10 Total 23

Summer Paralympics appearances (overview)
- 1996; 2000; 2004; 2008; 2012; 2016; 2020; 2024

Other related appearances
- Soviet Union (1988); Unified Team (1992)

There were 7 female and 15 male athletes representing the country at the 2000 Summer Paralympics.

== Medal table ==
Medal	Name	Sport	Event
Gold	Ruslan Sivitski	Athletics	Men's high jump F12
Gold	Volha Shuliakouskaya	Athletics	Women's 200m T12
Gold	Iryna Fiadotava; Aliaksandr Danilik	Cycling	Mixed tandem open
Gold	Iryna Fiadotava; Aliaksandr Danilik	Cycling	Mixed individual pursuit tandem open
Gold	Raman Makarau	Swimming	Men's 100m butterfly S12
Silver	Aliaksandr Tryputs	Athletics	Men's javelin F12
Silver	Viktar Khilmonchyk	Athletics	Men's shot put F42
Silver	Ruslan Sivitski	Athletics	Men's triple jump F12
Silver	Tamara Sivakova	Athletics	Women's discus F13
Silver	Aksana Sivitskaya	Athletics	Women's long jump F12
Silver	Iryna Leantsiuk	Athletics	Women's long jump F46
Silver	Raman Makarau	Swimming	Men's 100m backstroke S12
Silver	Raman Makarau	Swimming	Men's 200m individual medley SM12
Bronze	Oleg Chepel	Athletics	Men's 400m T12
Bronze	Viktar Zhukouski; Oleg Chepel; Vasili Shaptsiaboi; Aliaksandr Batsian	Athletics	Men's 4 × 400 m relay T13
Bronze	Yury Buchkou	Athletics	Men's discus F12
Bronze	Viktar Khilmonchyk	Athletics	Men's discus F42
Bronze	Oleg Chepel	Athletics	Men's high jump F12
Bronze	Yury Buchkou	Athletics	Men's shot put F12
Bronze	Iryna Leantsiuk	Athletics	Women's 100m T46
Bronze	Volha Shuliakouskaya	Athletics	Women's long jump F12
Bronze	Yury Rudzenok	Swimming	Men's 200m individual medley SM12

== See also ==
- Belarus at the 2000 Summer Olympics
- Belarus at the Paralympics

== Bibliography ==
- International Paralympic Committee (2000). "Appendix C: Athlete Numbers - By Delegation". Sydney 2000 Paralympic Games Post Games Report. Sydney.
