= Jaballah =

Jaballah is a common Arabic surname. Notable people with the surname include:

- Faïcel Jaballah (born 1988), Tunisian judoka
- Jihed Jaballah (born 1989), Tunisian handball player
- Khadija Jaballah, Tunisian paralympic athlete
- Mahmoud Jaballah, Egyptian-Canadian detained in Canada without charge on a "security certificate" for alleged association with terrorism
- Sabri Jaballah (born 1973), Tunisian football player
