= David MacCalman =

New Zealand Paralympic athlete

David MacCalman MNZM
Personal information
- Full name: David Francis MacCalman
- Born: 30 September 1958 (age 67)
Medal record
Men's para athletics
Representing New Zealand
Paralympic Games
Gold medal – first place	1992 Barcelona	Javelin throw - F52
Gold medal – first place	2000 Sydney	Pentathlon - P53
Silver medal – second place	1996 Atlanta	Javelin throw - F51

David Francis MacCalman MNZM (born 30 September 1958) is a Paralympian athlete from New Zealand competing mainly in category P53 pentathlon events. He lost the use of his legs after sustaining a spinal cord injury while diving into a river.

He competed in the 1992 Summer Paralympics in Barcelona, Spain. There he finished fourth in the men's Shot put – THW2 event, finished fifth in the men's javelin throw – THW2 event, finished twelve in the men's discus throw – THW2-3 event, finished seventh in the men's 200 metres – TW2 event and went out in the first round of the men's 800 metres – TW2 event. He also competed at the 1996 Summer Paralympics in Atlanta, United States. There he won a silver medal in the men's javelin throw – F51 event and finished sixth in the men's Shot put – F51 event. He also competed at the 2000 Summer Paralympics in Sydney, Australia. There he won a gold medal in the men's Pentathlon – P53 event, a gold medal in the men's javelin throw – F52 event and finished fourth in the men's Shot put – F52 event. He also competed at the 2004 Summer Paralympics in Atlanta, United States. There he finished twelve in the men's javelin throw – F52-53 event and finished ninth in the men's Shot put – F52 event. In the 2001 New Year Honours, he was appointed a Member of the New Zealand Order of Merit, for services to sport.

In 2011, MacCalman was the first person in New Zealand to buy the REX Bionics exoskeleton orthosis to enable him to walk.
