= Slovenia at the 2000 Summer Paralympics =

- IPC code: SLO
- NPC: Sports Federation for the Disabled of Slovenia
- Website: www.zsis.si

in Sydney
- Competitors: 17
- Medals Ranked 55th: Gold 0 Silver 2 Bronze 2 Total 4

Summer Paralympics appearances (overview)
- 1992; 1996; 2000; 2004; 2008; 2012; 2016; 2020; 2024

Other related appearances
- Yugoslavia (1972–2000)

Slovenia competed at the 2000 Summer Paralympics in Sydney, Australia. 17 competitors from Slovenia won 4 medals, including 2 silver and 2 bronze to finish 55th in the medal table.

== Medallists ==
Medal	Name	Sport	Event
Silver	Franjo Izlakar	Athletics	Men's shot put F37
Silver	Franc Pinter	Shooting	Men's air rifle standing SH1
Bronze	Janez Roškar	Athletics	Men's javelin F55
Bronze	Dragica Lapornik	Athletics	Women's shot put F55

== See also ==
- Slovenia at the Paralympics
- Slovenia at the 2000 Summer Olympics
