= Íñigo García (athlete) =

Spanish Paralympic athlete

Medal record

Paralympic athletics

Representing Spain

Paralympic Games
Silver medal – second place	2000 Sydney	Shot Put - F12

Íñigo García Ruiz is a paralympic athlete from Spain competing mainly in category F12 shot put and discus events.

Inigo has been a part of three Paralympic games since his first in 1996 Summer Paralympics in Atlanta. In each of 1996 Summer Paralympics, 2000 and 2004 Summer Paralympics he has competed in the shot put and discus, his only medal came in the shot put in 2000 where he won a silver medal.
