= Jaco Janse van Vuuren =

South African Paralympic athlete

Medal record

Paralympic athletics

Representing South Africa

Paralympic Games
Silver medal – second place	2000 Sydney	Long Jump - F37
Bronze medal – third place	1996 Atlanta	Javelin Throw - F36

Jaco Janse van Vuuren is a paralympic athlete from South Africa competing mainly in category F37 long jump and javelin events.

Jaco first competed in the 1996 Summer Paralympics in the F34-37 long jump and winning a bronze medal in the F36 javelin. He returned in 2000 but was unable to medal in the javelin but did win a silver in the F37 long jump; he also competed as part of the South African 4 × 100 m team.
