= Juan Martínez Martin =

Spanish Paralympic athlete

Juan Martínez
Personal information
- Full name: Juan Martínez Martin
- Born: 25 November 1980 (age 45) Granada, Spain
Medal record
Men's para-athletics
Representing Spain
Paralympic Games
Silver medal – second place	2000 Sydney	4×400 m relay T46

Juan Martínez Martin (born 25 November 1980 in Granada) is a track and field athlete from Spain. He competed in the T46 classification. He competed at the 2000 Summer Paralympics in Sydney, Australia, winning a silver medal in the 4 X 400 meter T42-T46 relay.
