= Lee Cox (athlete) =

Australian Paralympic athlete (born 1981)

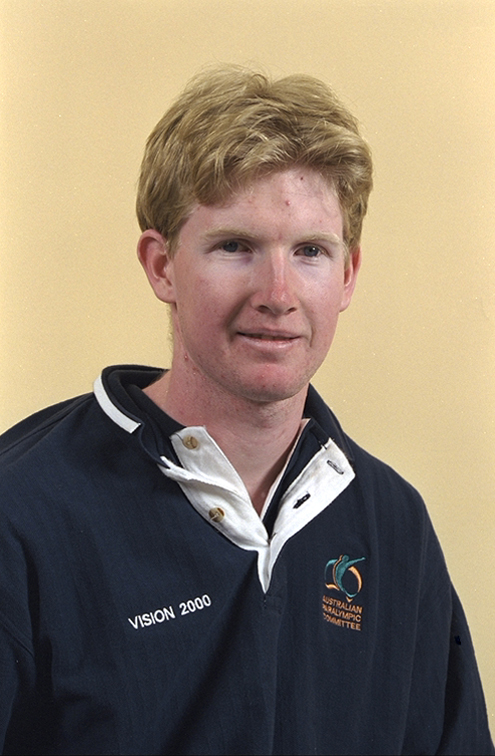
- 2000 Australian Paralympic team portrait of Cox

Personal information
- Nationality: Australia
- Born: 7 April 1981 (age 45)
Medal record
Paralympic athletics
Representing Australia
Paralympic Games
| Silver medal – second place | 2000 Sydney | Men's Pentathlon P13 |

Lee Cox (born 7 April 1981) is an Australian Paralympic athlete with a vision impairment. He was born in the Victorian town of Hamilton. At the 1996 Pacific School Games, he won two gold medals in the 400 m and discus events and four silver medals in the 100 m, 200 m, long jump and triple jump events, and in 1997 he was named Most Outstanding Junior Athlete by the Australian Blind Sports Federation,. He participated in the 1999 FESPIC Games, winning two silver medals in the 400 m and triple jump events and a bronze medal in the long jump event. At the 2000 Sydney Games, he won a silver medal in the men's Pentathlon – P13 event. At the time of the games he was living in New South Wales.
