= Stephen Brunt (athlete) =

British Paralympic athlete (born 1960)

Medal record

Paralympic athletics

Representing United Kingdom

Paralympic Games
Gold medal – first place	1988 Seoul	Marathon - B2
Gold medal – first place	1992 Barcelona	Marathon - B2
Silver medal – second place	2000 Sydney	Marathon - T12

Stephen Brunt MBE (born 21 July 1960) is a paralympic athlete from Great Britain competing mainly in category T12 distance runner events.

Brunt has run at four Paralympics. He competed in the 5000m in both the 1988 and 1992 Summer Paralympics, but it was in the marathon where he won medals, he won gold in 1988 and defended it in 1992, he failed to medal in the 1996 Summer Paralympics but came back and won a silver medal in the 2000 Summer Paralympics.

Brunt was appointed MBE in the 1996 New Year Honours.
