= Iván Hompanera =

Spanish Paralympic athlete (born 1969)

Medal record

Paralympic athletics

Representing Spain

Paralympic Games
Gold medal – first place	2000 Sydney	800 metres - T38
Gold medal – first place	2000 Sydney	5000 metres - T36

Iván Hompanera (born 26 January 1969) is a paralympic athlete from Spain competing mainly in category T36 middle distance events.

Hompanera competed in two Paralympics in 2000 and 2004. In 2000, he won gold in both of his events the T36 800m and the T38 5000m. While not defending his 5000m title in 2004, he did run the 800m but was unable to medal on that occasion. He also took part in the Spanish 4 × 400 m relay team that also failed to medal.
