= Rene Schramm =

German Paralympic athlete

Medal record

Track and field (athletics)

Representing Germany

Paralympic Games
Bronze medal – third place	2000 Sydney	Long Jump - F37

Rene Schramm is a paralympic athlete from Germany competing mainly in category T37 sprint events.

Rene competed at the 1996 Summer Paralympics in the 100m, 200m and long jump but was unable to finish in the top three. In 2000 he competed in the 100m, 4 × 100 m and won a bronze medal in the long jump. This would prove to be his only medal as he missed the 2004 games and was unable to medal in either the 100m or 200m in the 2008 Summer Paralympics.
