= Moon Jung-hoon =

South Korean Paralympic athlete

Medal record

Track and field (athletics)

Representing South Korea

Paralympic Games
Gold medal – first place	2000 Sydney	400 metres T53

- Moon Jung-hoon
- Hangul: 문정훈
- RR: Mun Jeonghun
- MR: Mun Chŏnghun

Moon Jung-hoon is a paralympic athlete from South Korea competing mainly in category T53 sprint events.

Moon competed at the 2000 Summer Paralympics winning the gold medal in the T53 400m. He also competed in the T53 800m and T54 200m but was unable to add to his medal tally.
