= Susana Echeverría =

Spanish Paralympic athlete

Medal record

Women's para-athletics

Representing Spain

Paralympic Games
Bronze medal – third place	2000 Sydney	Javelin throw F20

Susana Echeverría is a paralympic athlete from Spain competing mainly in category F20 throwing events.

Susanna competed in the intellectually disabled class at the 2000 Summer Paralympics in Sydney, Australia. There she competed in the shot put and the javelin, winning a bronze in the javelin.
