= Jesús González (Paralympian) =

Spanish Paralympic athlete

Medal record

Paralympic athletics

Representing Spain

Paralympic Games
Bronze medal – third place	2000 Sydney	1500 metres - T36

Jesús González is a paralympic athlete from Spain competing mainly in category T36 distance running events.

González has competed in two paralympics, firstly in Atlanta in 1996 where he finished outside the medals in both the 1500m and 5000m. He also competed at the 2000 Summer Paralympics where he ran the 800m and also won a bronze medal in the 1500m
