= Evelyn Schmied =

Austrian Paralympic athlete (1965–2019)

Evelyn Schmied-Wadda
Personal information
- Born: 15 December 1965 Vienna, Austria
- Died: 17 December 2019 (aged 54) Rennweg

Sport
- Country: Austria
- Sport: Paralympic athletics
- Disability: Spinal cord injury
- Disability class: F54
Medal record
Paralympic athletics
Representing Austria
Paralympic Games
Bronze medal – third place	2000 Sydney	Shot put F52-54
World Championships
Silver medal – second place	2002 Lille	Shot put F54
European Championships
Gold medal – first place	2003 Assen	Discus throw F54

Evelyn Schmied-Wadda (15 December 1965 – 17 December 2019) was an Austrian Paralympic athlete who competed at international track and field competitions. She was a Paralympic bronze medalist, World silver medalist and a European champion.

Schmied-Wadda died of cancer in a hospice in Rennweg.
