= Mauro Porpora =

Italian Paralympic athlete

Medal record

Paralympic athletics

Representing Italy

Paralympic Games
Gold medal – first place	2000 Sydney	4x100 metre relay - T11

Mauro Porpora is a paralympic athlete from Italy competing mainly in category T11 sprint events.

== Biography ==
Mauro Porpora competed in the Paralympics in 2000 where as well as doing the T11 200m he was part of the Italian T13 4 × 100 m relay team that won gold medals.
