= Basker =

Basker is a surname. Notable people with the surname include:

- Bob Basker (1918–2001), American civil rights activist
- James Basker (fl. from 1988), American scholar, writer, and educational leader
