= Lisa Llorens =

Australian Paralympic athlete

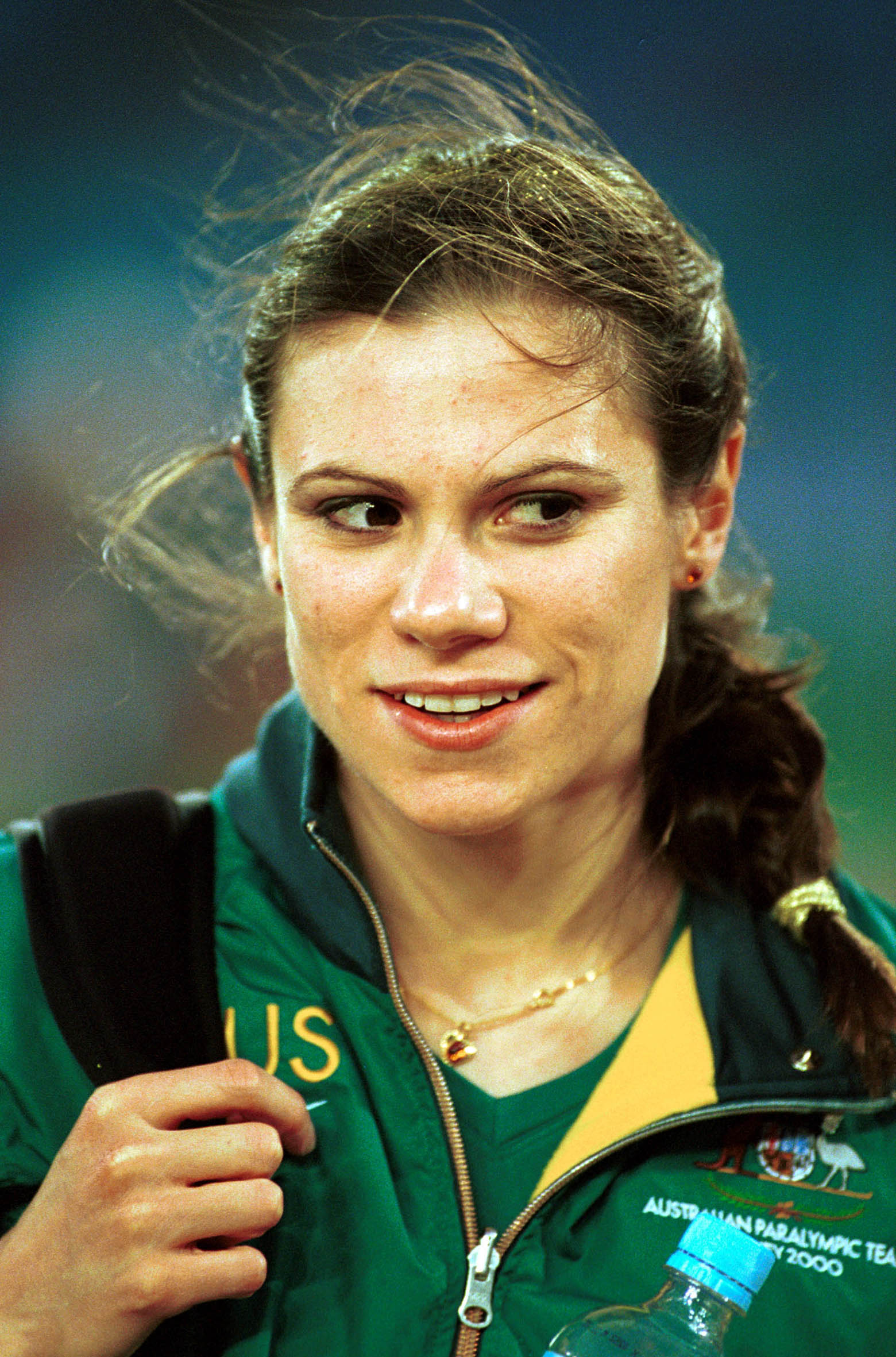
- Portrait of Llorens at the 2000 Summer Paralympics
Medal record
Athletics
Paralympic Games
| Gold medal – first place | 1996 Atlanta | Women's Long Jump MH |
| Gold medal – first place | 2000 Sydney | Women's 200m T20 |
| Gold medal – first place | 2000 Sydney | Women's High Jump F20 |
| Gold medal – first place | 2000 Sydney | Women's Long Jump F20 |
| Silver medal – second place | 2000 Sydney | Women's 100m T20 |
| Bronze medal – third place | 1996 Atlanta | Women's 200m MH |
IPC Athletics World Championships
| Gold medal – first place | 1998 Birmingham | Women's 100m T20 |
| Gold medal – first place | 1998 Birmingham | Women's Long Jump F20 |
| Gold medal – first place | 1998 Birmingham | Women's High Jump F20 |
| Gold medal – first place | 2002 Lille | Women's Long Jump F20 |
| Silver medal – second place | 1994 Berlin | Women's 200m T20 |
| Silver medal – second place | 1994 Berlin | Women's Long Jump T20 |
| Silver medal – second place | 2002 Lille | Women's 100m T20 |

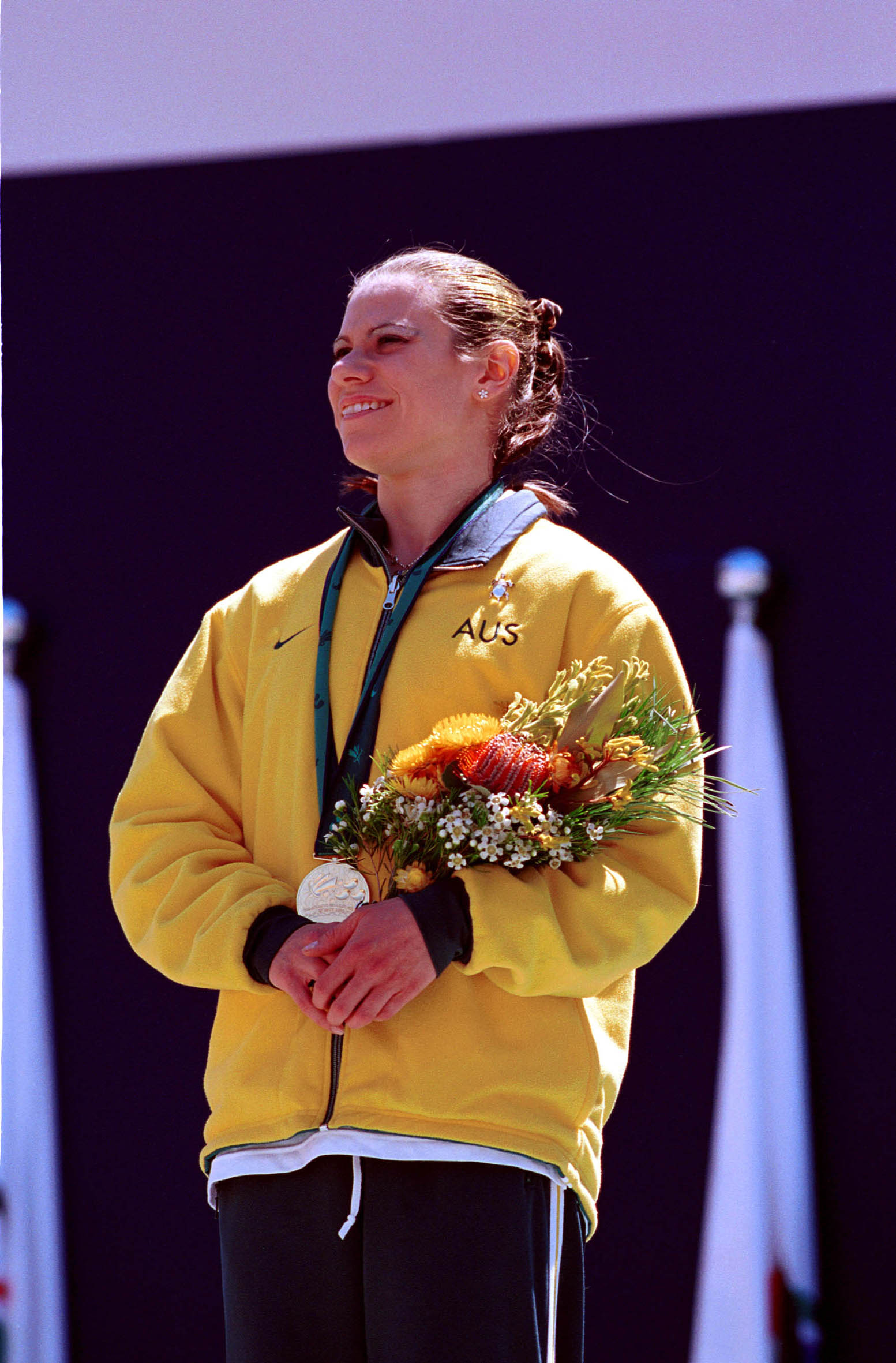
Llorens on the podium with her gold medal won in the 200 m T20 race at the 2000 Summer Paralympics

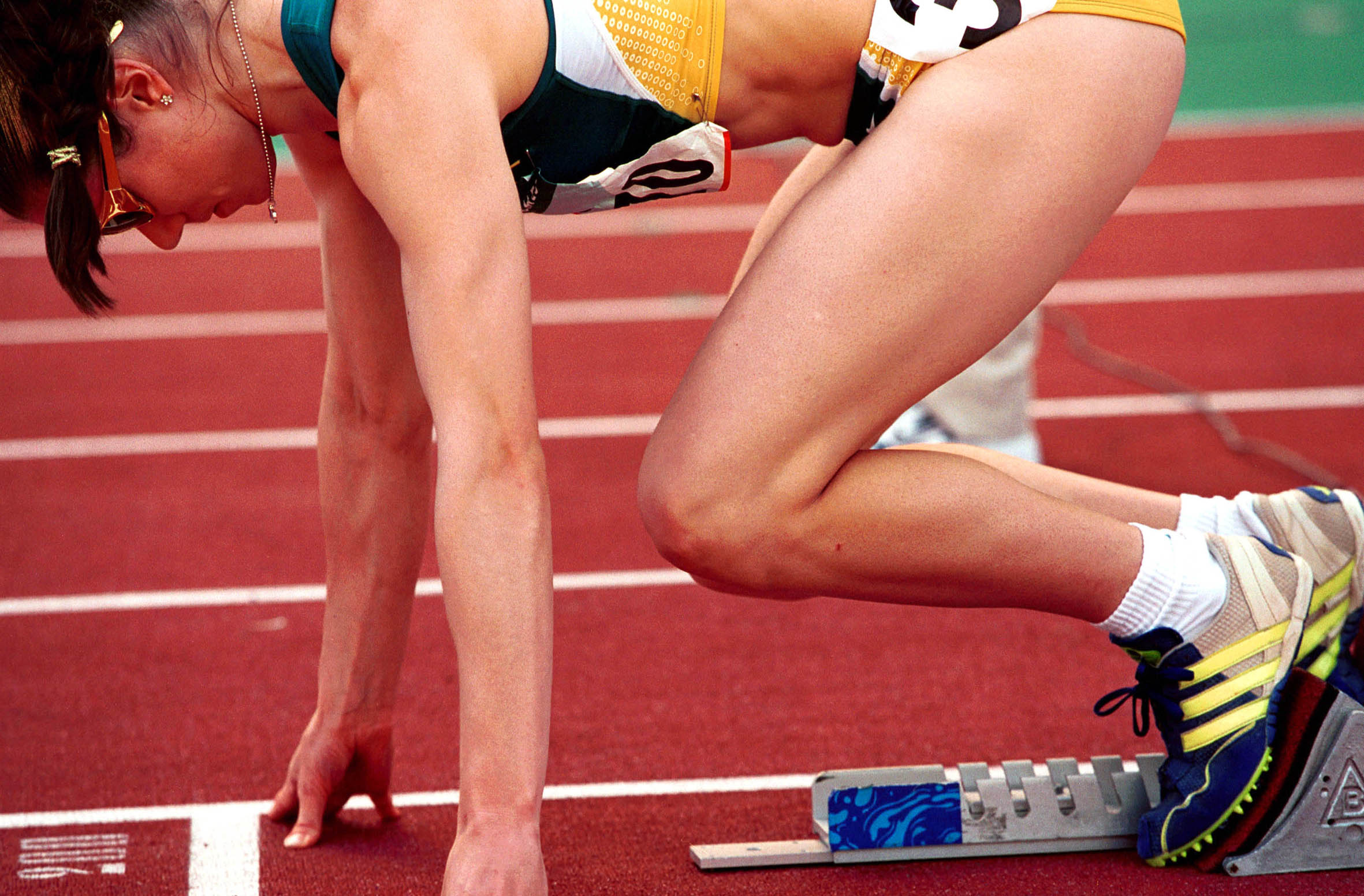
Llorens on the starting blocks during race competition at the 2000 Summer Paralympics

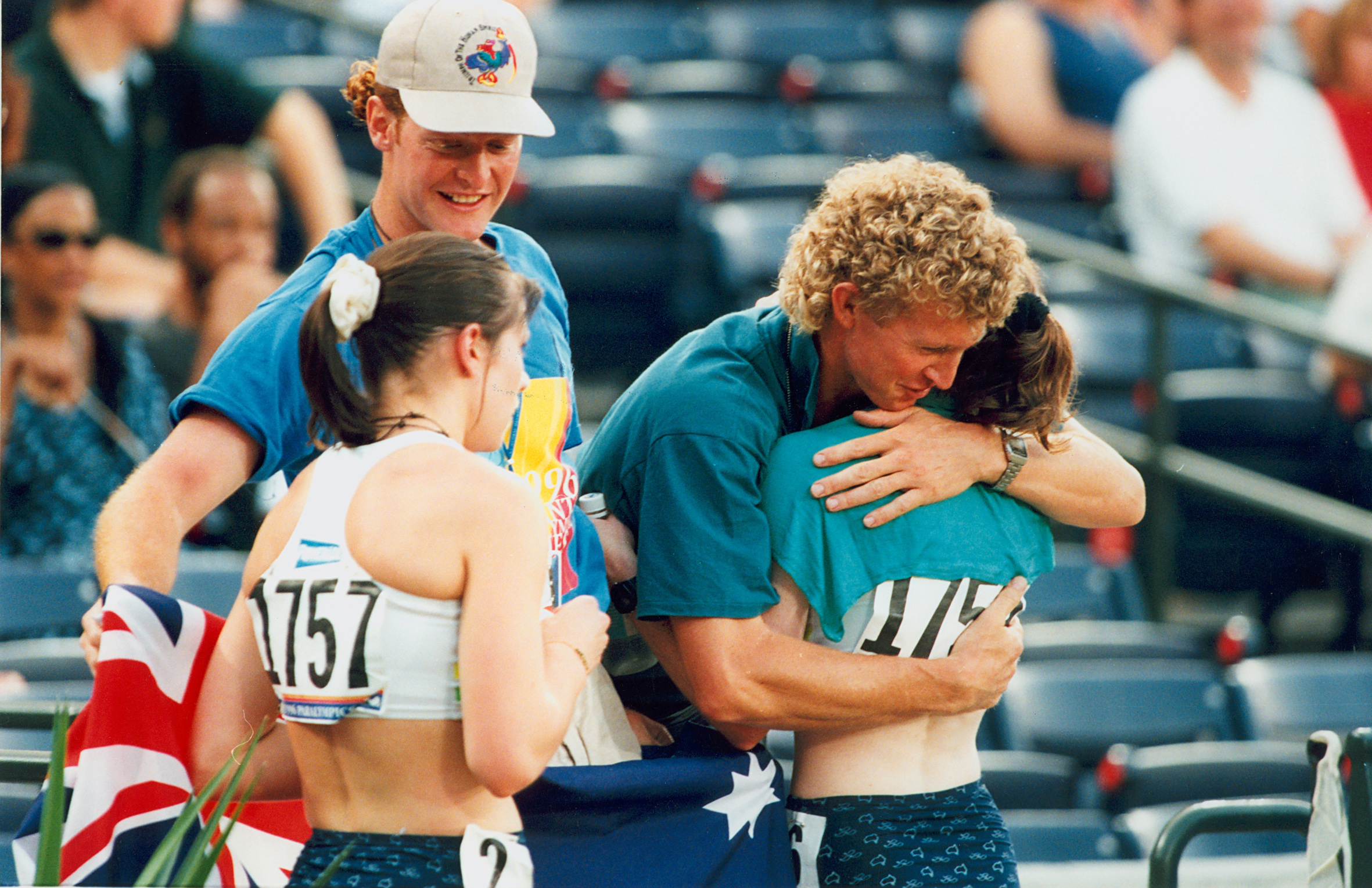
Australian athletics coaches Brett Jones (left) and Chris Nunn congratulate athletes Lisa Llorens (left, bronze medallist) and Sharon Rackham (gold medallist) after the T20 200m at the 1996 Atlanta Paralympic Games

Lisa Christina Llorens, OAM(born 17 January 1978) is an Australian Paralympic athlete. She was born in Canberra. She specialises in Paralympic high jumping, long jumping, and sprinting, participating in competitions for athletes with autism.

Llorens is known as "The Cheetah" because she has a great affinity with cheetahs. She commented "I feel like I have a connection with the cheetahs, because I'm quite shy, like a cat, and I run so fast." An educational documentary was made about her called Lisa Llorens: A Cheetah on the Track. From 1998 to 2002, she held an athletics scholarship from the Australian Institute of Sport for Athletes with a Disability.

Llorens competed at the 1996 Summer Paralympics in Atlanta, winning gold and bronze medals in track and field events. She received a Medal of the Order of Australia for her 1996 gold medal. She also represented Australia at the 2000 Summer Paralympics in Sydney, and won three gold medals in the 200 metre sprint, the high jump, and the long jump, and a silver medal in the 100 metre sprint. She broke the Paralympic world record three times during her four long jumps.

Llorens also competed at the IPC Athletics World Championships in 1994, winning silver in both the long jump and the 200m; and in 1998, won gold in the 100m, high jump, and long jump . She took part in the Paralympic World Cup in 1998, winning gold in the 100 metre sprint, the high jump and the long jump. In 2004, due to the International Paralympic Committee's decision to remove events for intellectually disabled athletes from its official activities, Llorens retired, as she felt that there was nothing left for her to achieve in sport.

The Australian Paralympic Committee describes her as "Australia’s most outstanding female athlete with an intellectual disability", along with Crystal-Lea Adams. In 1997, she was awarded the Australian Capital Territory Female Sportstar of the Year, and Young Canberra Citizen of the Year. In November 2015, she was inducted into the ACT Sport Hall of Fame. In 2016, Llorens was inducted into the International Sports Federation for Persons with Intellectual Disability (INAS) Hall of Fame.
