= Michael Keohane =

American Paralympic athlete

Medal record

Paralympic athletics

Representing United States

Paralympic Games
Bronze medal – third place	2000 Sydney	Marathon - T46

Michael Keohane is a paralympic athlete from the United States competing mainly in category T46 distance running events.

Michael ran the 1500m and 5000m at the 1996 Summer Paralympics, but it was at the 2000 Summer Paralympics in Sydney where he won his first and only medal, a bronze in the T46 marathon race.
