= David Barrallo =

Spanish Paralympic athlete

Personal information
- Full name: David Barrallo Fuertes
- Born: 4 June 1973 (age 53) Barcelona, Spain
Medal record
Men's para-athletics
Representing Spain
Paralympic Games
Silver medal – second place	2000 Sydney	4×400 m relay T46

David Barrallo Fuertes (Note: In this Spanish name, the first or paternal surname is Barrallo and the second or maternal family name is Fuertes.) (born 4 June 1973 in Barcelona) is a paralympic athlete from Spain competing mainly in category T44 sprint events.

David competed as part of the Spanish Paralympic team at the 2000 Summer Paralympics in Sydney. There he competed in the 200m and 400m and was part of both the Spanish 4 × 100 m relay team and the silver medal-winning 4 × 400 m relay team.
