= Fanie Lombaard =

South African Paralympic athlete

Personal information
- Born: 29 May 1969 (age 57)
Medal record
Men's para-athletics
Representing South Africa
Paralympic Games
Gold medal – first place	2000 Sydney	Pentathlon - P42
Gold medal – first place	2000 Sydney	Discus Throw - F42
Gold medal – first place	2000 Sydney	Shot Put - F42
Gold medal – first place	2004 Athens	Discus Throw - F42
Gold medal – first place	2004 Athens	Shot Put - F42
Gold medal – first place	2008 Beijing	Discus Throw - F42
Silver medal – second place	2000 Sydney	Javelin Throw - F42
Silver medal – second place	2004 Athens	Javelin Throw - F42
Bronze medal – third place	2008 Beijing	Pentathlon - F42

Fanie Lombaard (also spelled Lombard; born 29 May 1969) is an athlete and Paralympian from South Africa competing in P42 pentathlon and F42 throwing events.

He competed in the 2000 Summer Paralympics in Sydney, Australia. There he won a gold medal in the men's Pentathlon - P42 event, a gold medal in the men's Discus throw - F42 event, a gold medal in the men's Shot put - F42 event and a silver medal in the men's Javelin throw - F42 event. He also competed at the 2004 Summer Paralympics in Athens, Greece. There he won a gold medal in the men's Discus throw - F42 event, a gold medal in the men's Shot put - F42 event and a silver medal in the men's Javelin throw - F42 event. He competed in the 2008 Summer Paralympics in Beijing, People's Republic of China where he won a bronze medal in the F42 shot put and a gold medal in the F42 discus throw.

Lombaard is world record holder in F42 discus and P42 pentathlon events.

In 2011 Lombaard was suspended for 1 year after he failed a drug test for probenecid doping.
