= Rebecca Feldman =

Australian Paralympic athlete (born 1982)

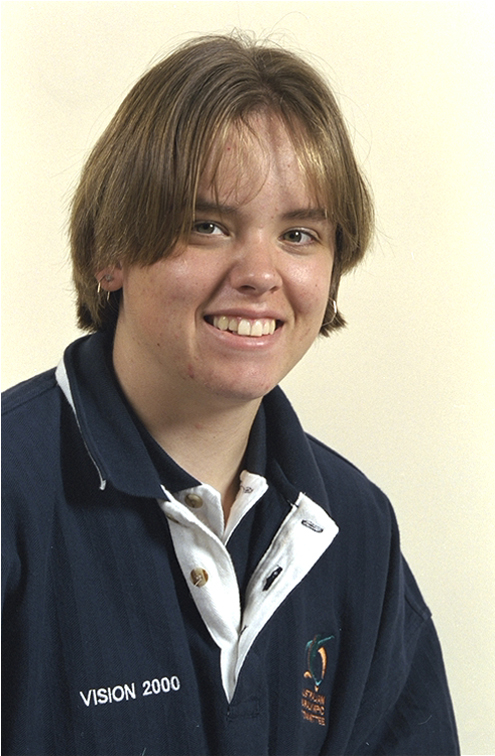
- 2000 Australian Paralympic team portrait of Feldman

Personal information
- Full name: Rebecca Elizabeth Feldman
- Nationality: Australia
- Born: 8 February 1982 (age 44) Melbourne, Victoria
Medal record
Wheelchair athletics
Paralympic Games
| Gold medal – first place | 2000 Sydney | 400m T34 |
| Silver medal – second place | 2000 Sydney | 100m T34 |
| Bronze medal – third place | 2000 Sydney | 200m T34 |
IPC Athletics World Championships
| Silver medal – second place | 1998 Birmingham | 200 m T33 |
| Silver medal – second place | 1998 Birmingham | 400 m T33 |

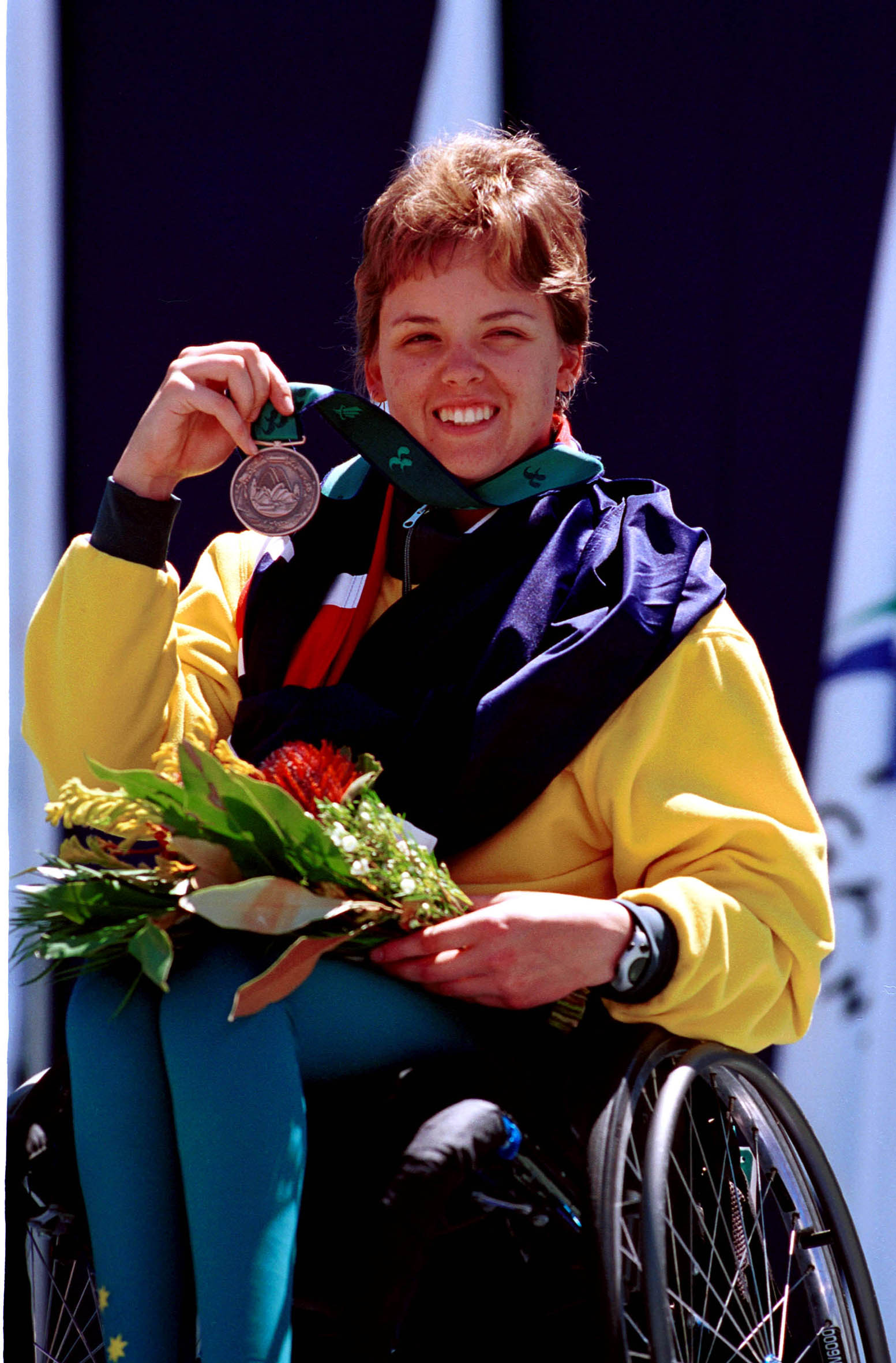
Feldman on the medal podium with the bronze medal that she won in the 200 m T34 wheelchair race, 2000 Summer Paralympics

Rebecca Elizabeth Feldman, OAM (born 8 February 1982 in Melbourne, Victoria) is a wheelchair racer from Victoria, Australia. She won a gold medal at the 2000 Sydney Games in the women's 400 m T34 event, for which she received a Medal of the Order of Australia, a silver medal in the 100m T34 event and a bronze medal in the 200m T34 event. In 2000, she received an Australian Sports Medal.

After her career as a Paralympian, Rebecca became involved in disability advocacy, including with young people and people with multiple and complex disabilities. Her roles have included individual and systemic advocacy, case management, peer group facilitation and community development across the disability service provision and local government sectors. She has worked on a range of projects including housing, access to live music, short-film and volunteering as well as staff and customer training.

Rebecca is currently part of Leadership Victoria’s disability leadership program.

Rebecca is also active in the leadership of Neighbourhood Connect Inc, an Australian charity and national not-for-profit community organisation that facilitates the re-connection of people in their local neighbourhoods, as advocated by Hugh Mackay.
