= Adrian Grogan =

Australian Paralympic athlete (born 1977)

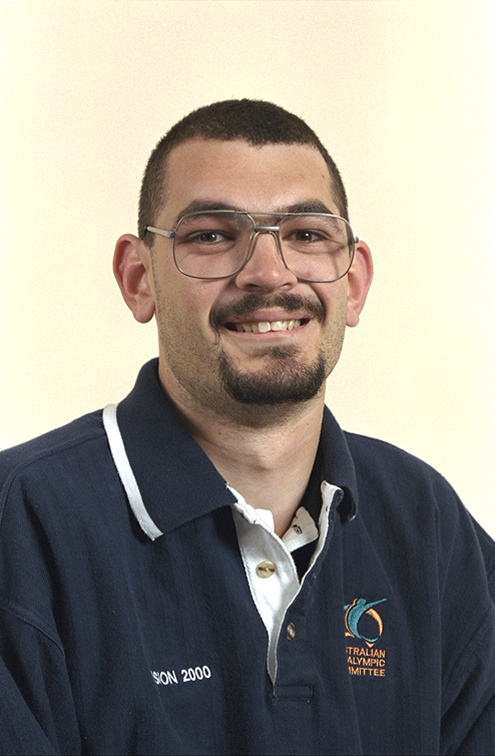
- 2000 Australian Paralympic team portrait of Grogan

Personal information
- Full name: Adrian Paul Grogan
- Nationality: Australia
- Born: 6 July 1977 (age 49) Parramatta, New South Wales
Medal record
Athletics
Paralympic Games
| Gold medal – first place | 2000 Sydney | Men's 4x100 m Relay T38 |
| Gold medal – first place | 2000 Sydney | Men's 4x400 m Relay T38 |
IPC Athletics World Championships
| Bronze medal – third place | 1998 Birmingham | Men's 4 x 400m T35-38) |

Adrian Paul Grogan, OAM (born 6 July 1977) is an Australian Paralympic athlete. He was born in the Sydney suburb of Parramatta, and has cerebral palsy. He won two bronze medals in the 200 m and 400 m events at the 1994 FESPIC Games in Beijing. He participated but did not win any medals at the 1996 Atlanta Paralympics. At the 2000 Sydney Paralympics, he won two gold medals in the Men's 4x100 m Relay T38 and Men's 4x400 m Relay T38 events, for which he received a Medal of the Order of Australia.
