= Kazumi Sakai =

Japanese Paralympic athlete

Medal record

Paralympic athletics

Representing Japan

Paralympic Games
Silver medal – second place	2000 Sydney	High Jump - F20

Kazumi Sakai (酒井 かづみ, Sakai Kazumi) is a paralympic athlete from Japan competing mainly in category F20 high jump events.

Kazumi competed in the F20 high jump at the 2000 Summer Paralympics winning the silver medal.
