= Mikkel Gaarder =

Norwegian Paralympic athlete

Medal record

Paralympic athletics

Representing Norway

Paralympic Games
Silver medal – second place	2000 Sydney	200 metres - T51

Mikkel Gaarder is a paralympic athlete from Norway competing mainly in category T51 track events.

Mikkel competed in various track races at the 2000 Summer Paralympics ranging from the 200m up to the marathon, but it was in the shortest of those events the 200m that he won his only medal a silver. He returned to the Paralympics in 2004 where he competed in just the two events, the 200m and the marathon but was unable to medal in either.
