= Waldemar Kikolski =

Polish Paralympic athlete (1967–2001)

Personal information
- Born: 21 October 1967 Łapy, Poland
- Died: 1 May 2001 (aged 33) Třanovice, Czech Republic

Sport
- Country: Poland
- Sport: Paralympic athletics
- Disability class: T11
Medal record
sport
Representing Poland
Paralympic Games
Gold medal – first place	1992 Barcelona	800 metres - B2
Gold medal – first place	1996 Atlanta	Marathon - T11
Gold medal – first place	2000 Sydney	Marathon - T12
Silver medal – second place	1992 Barcelona	1500 metres - B2
Silver medal – second place	1992 Barcelona	5000 metres - B2
Silver medal – second place	1996 Atlanta	10000 metres - T11
Bronze medal – third place	1996 Atlanta	5000 metres - T11

Waldemar Kikolski (21 October 1967 – 1 May 2001) was a paralympic athlete from Poland competing mainly in category T11 distance running events.

== Biography ==
Waldemar has successfully competed at three Summer Paralympics. His first were in Barcelona in 1992, where he won the B2 class 800m and finished second in the 1500m and 5000m. At the 1996 Summer Paralympics he moved up in distance, winning the T11 Marathon, second in the 10000m and third in 5000m as well as competing in the 1500m. His third and final appearance came in the 2000 Summer Paralympics, where he again won a gold in medal at the marathon but missed out on a medal in the 10000m.

Kikolski died in a road accident in Třanovice when he was travelling back from an athletics competition in Italy.
