= Robert De Friese Evans =

American Paralympic athlete

Medal record

Paralympic athletics

Representing United States

Paralympic Games
Gold medal – first place	2000 Sydney	1500 metres - T46
Gold medal – first place	2000 Sydney	5000 metres - T46

Robert De Friese Evans is a paralympic athlete from the United States competing mainly in category T46 distance events.

Robert competed at the 2000 Summer Paralympics where he was the stand out distance runner in the Men's T46 class winning gold in both the 1500m and 5000m, he was also part of the American 4 × 100 m relay team that was unable to medal.

In the 5000m, Robert ran a world record, beating silver medalist Javier Conde (athlete) and taking the gold.
