= Dana Zimmerman =

American Paralympic athlete

Medal record

Paralympic athletics

Representing United States

Paralympic Games
| Silver medal – second place | 2000 Sydney | 1500 metres - T37 |

Dana Zimmerman is an American paralympic athlete and disability advisor from Minnesota competing mainly in category T37 distance events.

Zimmerman competed in the 800m, 1500m and 5000m at the 1996 Summer Paralympics in his home country. He also competed in the 2000 Summer Paralympics in the 5000m and won a silver medal in the 1500m.

== Education ==
Dana Zimmerman received a masters in physical education with a concentration in adapted physical education at University of Wisconsin La Crosse.

== Career ==
After competing in the Paralympics, Dana Zimmerman became a physical education professor at the University of Wisconsin River Falls. Later, he became an academic advisor of Student Support Services for Students with Disabilities at St. Olaf College.

== Personal life ==
Dana Zimmerman was born with cerebral palsy.
