= José Fernandez (athlete) =

Spanish Paralympic athlete (born 1975)

José Fernández
Personal information
- Full name: José Manuel Fernández Barranquero
- Born: 19 March 1975 (age 51) Málaga, Spain
Medal record
Representing Spain
Men's para-athletics
Paralympic Games
Silver medal – second place	2000 Sydney	4×400 m relay T46
Bronze medal – third place	2000 Sydney	800 m T46
Men's para-duathlon
European Championships
Silver medal – second place	2017 Soria	PTS4

José Manuel Fernández Barranquero (born 19 March 1975 in Málaga) is a paralympic athlete from Spain competing mainly in category T46 track events.

Fernandez competed in three Paralympics over varying distances. His first games were in 1992 Summer Paralympics in his home country where he competed in the 1500m, 10000m and marathon. In 1996 he competed in the 100m, 200m, 400m and 800m but was still unable to win that elusive medal. However, in the 2000 Summer Paralympics he competed in the 400m, won a bronze in the 800m and was part of the silver medal-winning Spanish 400m relay team.
