= Lioubov Vassilieva =

Russian Paralympic athlete

Personal information
- Nationality: Russian
- Born: 6 October 1971 (age 54) Volgograd, Russia

Sport
- Country: Russia
- Sport: Paralympic athletics
Medal record
Paralympic athletics
Representing Russia
Paralympic Games
Gold medal – first place	2000 Sydney	400 metres - T46
Silver medal – second place	1992 Barcelona	200 metres - TS4
Silver medal – second place	2000 Sydney	200 metres - T46

Lioubov Vassilieva (born 6 October 1971) is a Russian paralympic athlete competing mainly in category T46 sprint events.

Lioubov competed in the 2000 Summer Paralympics in Sydney where as well as competing in the 100m, she won a silver medal in the 200m behind Australia's double gold medalist, Amy Winters and won a gold medal in the 400m pushing Amy into third.
