= Joanne Bradshaw =

Australian Paralympic athlete (born 1961)

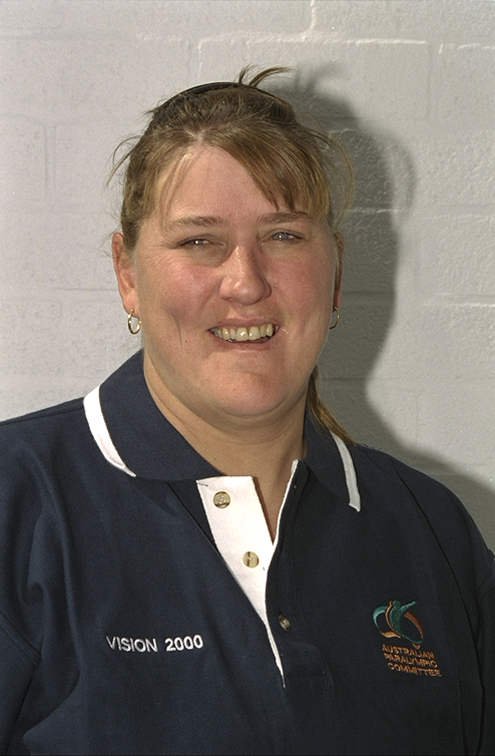
- 2000 Australian Paralympic team portrait of Bradshaw

Personal information
- Full name: Joanne Meryl Bradshaw
- Nationality: Australia
- Born: 8 November 1961 (age 64) Yallourn
Medal record
Wheelchair athletics
Paralympic Games
Gold medal – first place	2000 Sydney	Womnen's Shot Put F37
IPC Athletics World Championships
Silver medal – second place	1998 Birmingham	Women's Shot Put F37
Silver medal – second place	1998 Birmingham	Women's Discus F37-38
Bronze medal – third place	1998 Birmingham	Women's Javelin F37

Joanne Meryl Bradshaw, OAM (born 8 November 1961) is an Australian Paralympic athlete. She was born in the Victorian town of Yallourn,. She has one daughter, Paige. At the 1998 IPC Athletics World Championships in Birmingham, she won silver medals in the women's shot put and women's discus and a bronze medal in the women's javelin. She won a gold medal at the 2000 Sydney Games in the women's shot put F37 event, in the process setting a new Paralympic record. She received a Medal of the Order of Australia for her 2000 gold medal. She competed but did not win any medals at the 2004 Athens Games.
