= Moisés Beristáin =

Mexican Paralympic athlete

Medal record

Paralympic athletics

Representing Mexico

Paralympic Games
Gold medal – first place	2000 Sydney	10000 metres - T12
Silver medal – second place	2000 Sydney	5000 metres - T12
Bronze medal – third place	2000 Sydney	Marathon - T12

Moisés Beristáin Gutiérrez is a paralympic athlete from Mexico competing mainly in category T12 long-distance events.

== Biography ==
Moisés Beristáin competed in three Paralympic games, his first, and most successful in 2000 where he won a gold in the 10000m, silver in the 5000m and bronze in the marathon. Despite competing in the same three events in 2004 and the 10000m and marathon in 2008 he never again won a Paralympic medal. However he continued to compete and won the 2016 Mexico City Marathon.
