= Tatiana Mezinova =

Russian Paralympic athlete

Medal record

Paralympic athletics

Representing Russia

Paralympic Games
Silver medal – second place	1996 Atlanta	Javelin Throw - F42-44/46
Bronze medal – third place	2000 Sydney	Javelin Throw - F44
Bronze medal – third place	2000 Sydney	Shot Put - F44

Tatiana Mezinova, (Russian: Татьяна Мезинова), is a paralympic athlete from Russia competing mainly in category F44 throwing events.

== Career ==
Tatiana has competed at three Paralympic games in 1996, 2000 and 2004. She won a silver medal in the javelin in the 1996 games in Atlanta as well as competing in the shot and discus. In 2000 she restricted herself to the shot and javelin, winning a bronze medal in both events before returning to all three throws in 2004 where she failed to add to her medal haul.
