= Tanya Swanepoel =

South African Paralympic athlete

Medal record

Paralympic athletics

Representing South Africa

Paralympic Games
Silver medal – second place	2000 Sydney	Shot Put - F33/34
Bronze medal – third place	2000 Sydney	Discus Throw - F33/34

Tanya Swanepoel is a paralympic athlete from South Africa competing mainly in category F33 shot put and discus events.

Swanepoelcompeted in the shot put and discus throw at both the 2000 Summer Paralympics and the 2004 Summer Paralympics. It was in the first of these two games that she won her medals, a bronze in the discus and a silver in the shot put.
