= Óscar Serrano (athlete) =

Spanish Paralympic athlete

Medal record

Paralympic athletics

Representing Spain

Paralympic Games
Bronze medal – third place	2000 Sydney	5000 metres - T12

Óscar Serrano González (born 12 October 1973, in Madrid) is a Spanish vision impaired T12/B2 track and field athlete. He competed in the 2000 Summer Paralympics, winning a bronze medal in the T12 1,500 meter race.

Serrano competed in the 2000 Summer Paralympics where he competed in the 1500m and won a bronze in the 5000m.
