= Victoria Chernova =

Russian Paralympic athlete

Medal record

Paralympic athletics

Representing Russia

Paralympic Games
Bronze medal – third place	2000 Sydney	800 metres - T12
Bronze medal – third place	2000 Sydney	5000 metres - T12

Victoria Vladimirovna Chernova (Russian: Викто́рия Влади́мировна Черно́ва) is a paralympic athlete from Russia competing mainly in category T12 middle-distance events.

Victoria competed in the 2000 Summer Paralympics where she won bronze medals in both the 800m and 5000m as well as competing in the 1500m
