= Ariadne Hernández =

Mexican Paralympic athlete

Medal record

Paralympic athletics

Representing Mexico

Paralympic Games
Silver medal – second place	2000 Sydney	5000m T54
Bronze medal – third place	2000 Sydney	800m T54
Bronze medal – third place	2000 Sydney	1500m T54

Parapan American Games
Silver medal – second place	2007 Rio de Janeiro	800m T54

Ariadne Hernández Rodríguez is a paralympic track and field athlete from Mexico competing mainly in category F53 middle to long-distance events.

Ariadne competed in both the 2000 and 2004 Summer Paralympics, on both occasions in the 800m, 1500m, 5000m and marathon. She won a total of three medals, all in the 2000 games, a silver in the 5000m and bronzes in both the 800m and 1500m.
