= Wolfgang Dubin =

Austrian paralympic athlete

Medal record
Paralympic athletics
Representing Austria
Paralympic Games
Gold medal – first place	2000 Sydney	Shot Put - F36
Bronze medal – third place	1996 Atlanta	Shot Put - F35

Wolfgang Dubin is a paralympic athlete from Austria competing mainly in category F36 shot and discus events.

Wolfgang has competed in the shot and discus in the 1996, 2000 and 2004 Summer Paralympics. In the 1996 games he won a bronze medal in the shot put, this improved to gold in 2000 but in 2004 after winning the silver medal in the shot put he had it withdrawn because he didn't hold the necessary paperwork for the therapeutic use of a medicine that he was taking.
