= Ihor Horbenko =

Ukrainian Paralympic athlete

Medal record

Track and field (athletics)

Representing Ukraine

Paralympic Games
Silver medal – second place	2000 Sydney	Long Jump - F12
Bronze medal – third place	1996 Atlanta	Triple Jump - F11
Bronze medal – third place	2000 Sydney	Triple Jump - F12

Igor Horbenko is a paralympic athlete from Ukraine competing mainly in category F12 long and triple jump events.

Igor has competed in three Paralympics, always competing in the long jump and triple jump. He won a silver in the long jump in the 2000 Summer Paralympics and won two bronzes in the triple jump in 1996 and 2000
