= Christelle Bosker =

South African Paralympic athlete

Medal record

Paralympic athletics

Representing South Africa

Paralympic Games
Gold medal – first place	2000 Sydney	Discus Throw - F37
Gold medal – first place	2000 Sydney	Javelin Throw - F37
Bronze medal – third place	2000 Sydney	Shot Put - F37

Christelle Bosker is a paralympic athlete from South Africa, competing mainly in category F37 throwing events.

Bosker competed in all three throws at the 2000 Summer Paralympics, winning gold in both the discus and javelin and finishing third in the shot put, just two centimetres behind the winner Joanne Bradshaw of the host nation Australia.
