= Pierre-François Corosine =

French Paralympic athlete

Medal record

Men's para athletics

Representing France

Paralympic Games
Silver medal – second place	2000 Sydney	4x400 m T38

Pierre-François Corosine is a paralympic athlete from France competing mainly in category T37 sprints events.

Pierre competed in the 2000 Summer Paralympics in both the 100m and 200m before taking part in both relays winning a silver medal with the French 4 × 400 m relay team for category T38 athletes.
