= Liudys Masso =

Cuban Paralympic athlete

Medal record

Paralympic athletics

Representing Cuba

Paralympic Games
Gold medal – first place	2000 Sydney	Discus throw F13

Liudys Masso is a paralympic athlete from Cuba competing mainly in category F13 discus throw events.

Liudys competed at the 2000 Summer Paralympics winning the gold medal in the F13 discus with a new world record. She then attempted to defend her title in the 2004 Summer Paralympics bit was unable to get a legal performance.
