= Pedro Zamorano =

French Paralympic athlete

Medal record

Men's para athletics

Representing France

Paralympic Games
Silver medal – second place	2000 Sydney	4x400 metre relay - T38

Pedro Zamorano is a paralympic athlete from France competing mainly in category T37 middle-distance events.

Pedro competed in the 800m and 1500m at the 2000 Summer Paralympics before helping the French relay team to a silver medal in the 4 × 400 m.
