= Jesús Lucero =

Mexican Paralympic athlete

Medal record

Paralympic athletics

Representing Mexico

Paralympic Games
Silver medal – second place	2000 Sydney	Javelin Throw - F20

Jesús Edgardo Lucero Vázquez is a paralympic athlete from Mexico competing mainly in category F20 javelin events.

Jesus competed in the 2000 Summer Paralympics winning a silver medal in the F20 javelin.
