= Mohamed Ali Fatnassi =

Tunisian Paralympic athlete

Medal record

Paralympic athletics

Representing Tunisia

Paralympic Games
Silver medal – second place	2000 Sydney	Shot Put - F20

Mohamed Ali Fatnassi is a paralympic athlete from Tunisia competing mainly in category F20 shot put events.

Mohamed's only appearance at the Paralympics was in 2000 Summer Paralympics where he won a silver medal in the F20 shot put.
