= Franck Barre =

French Paralympic athlete

Medal record

Track and field (athletics)

Representing France

Paralympic Games
Silver medal – second place	2000 Sydney	Long Jump - F44

Franck Barre is a paralympic athlete from France competing mainly in category F45 long jump events.

Franck competed in Sydney in the 2000 Summer Paralympics. There he competed in the long jump and won the silver medal in the F44 class.
