= Diosmany Santana =

Cuban Paralympic athlete

Medal record

Paralympic athletics

Representing Cuba

Paralympic Games
Silver medal – second place	2000 Sydney	10000 metres - T12
Bronze medal – third place	2000 Sydney	5000 metres - T12

Diosmany Santana is a paralympic athlete from Cuba competing mainly in category T12 distance running events.

Diosmany competed in the 2000 Summer Paralympics winning a bronze medal in the 5000m and a silver medal in the 10000m.
