= Jane Mandean =

South African Paralympic athlete

Medal record

Paralympic athletics

Representing South Africa

Paralympic Games
Bronze medal – third place	2000 Sydney	Discus Throw - F37

Jane Mandean is a paralympic athlete from South Africa competing mainly in category F37 throwing events.

== Biography ==
Jane Mandean competed in the three Paralympics winning just one medal. Her first games were in Atlanta in 1996 Summer Paralympics where she competed in the discus. She then competed in Sydney in 2000 in the shot put and discus winning herself a bronze medal in the discus. 2004 in Athens proved less successful as she was unable to medal in the shot put, discus or javelin.
