= Serhiy Kolos =

Ukrainian Paralympic athlete

Medal record

Paralympic athletics

Representing Ukraine

Paralympic Games
Silver medal – second place	2000 Sydney	Javelin Throw - F35

Sergiy Kolos is a paralympic athlete from Ukraine competing mainly in category F35 throwing events.

Sergiy has competed at two Paralympics, firstly in 2000 Summer Paralympics where he competed in the discus and shot as well as winning a silver medal in the Javelin. His second games came in 2004 Summer Paralympics where he competed in the discus and javelin but was unable to add to his medal tally.
