= Ihor Bodnar =

Ukrainian Paralympic athlete

Medal record

Paralympic athletics

Representing Ukraine

Paralympic Games
Bronze medal – third place	2000 Sydney	1500 metres - T20

Ihor Bodnar is a paralympic athlete from Ukraine competing mainly in category T20 middle distance and sprint events.

Ihor competed in the 2000 Summer Paralympics winning a bronze medal in the 1500m and also competing in the 400m.
