= Wissam Ben Bahri =

Tunisian Paralympic athlete

Medal record

Paralympic athletics

Representing Tunisia

Paralympic Games
Gold medal – first place	2000 Sydney	High Jump - F20
Silver medal – second place	1996 Atlanta	Long Jump - MH
Silver medal – second place	2000 Sydney	Long Jump - F20

Wissam Ben Bahri is a paralympic athlete from Tunisia competing mainly in category F20 long jump and high jump events.

Wissam competed at the 1996 Summer Paralympics where he won a silver medal in the long jump as well as competing in the 200m. He won a second silver in the long jump at the 2000 Summer Paralympics where he also won a gold in the high jump and competed in the 100m.
