= Ali Ghribi =

Tunisian Paralympic athlete

Medal record

Paralympic athletics

Representing Tunisia

Paralympic Games
Gold medal – first place	2000 Sydney	Pentathlon - P58

Ali Ghribi is a Paralympic athlete from Tunisia competing mainly in category P58 pentathlon events.

He competed in the 2000 Summer Paralympics in Sydney, Australia. There he won a gold medal in the men's Pentathlon - P58 event. He also competed at the 2004 Summer Paralympics in Athens, Greece, finished eighth in the men's Discus throw - F58 event, finished seventh in the men's Javelin throw - F58 event and finished fourth in the men's Pentathlon - P54-58 event
