= Valeriy Stepanskoy =

Russian Paralympic athlete

Medal record

Paralympic athletics

Representing Russia

Paralympic Games
Silver medal – second place	2000 Sydney	800 metres - T38

Valeriy Stepanskoy is a paralympic athlete from Russia competing mainly in category T38 running events.

He competed in the 2000 Summer Paralympics in Sydney, Australia winning a silver in the 800m and competing in the 400m and 5000m. He also competed in the 2004 Summer Paralympics in the 400m and 800m but could not add further to his medal tally.
