= Viktar Khilmonchyk =

Belarusian Paralympic athlete

Medal record

Paralympic athletics

Representing Belarus

Paralympic Games
Silver medal – second place	2000 Sydney	Shot Put - F42
Silver medal – second place	2004 Athens	Shot Put - F42
Bronze medal – third place	2000 Sydney	Discus Throw - F42

Viktar Khilmonchyk (Belarusian: Віктар Хільмончык) is a paralympic athlete from Belarus competing mainly in category F42 shot put and discus events.

Viktar has competed in the F42 class shot and discus at each of the 2000, 2004 and 2008 Summer Paralympics. He won the bronze in the discus in 2000 and the silver in the shot at both the 2000 and 2004 games but was unable to win anything in the 2008 event.
