= Hein Seyerling =

South African Paralympic athlete

Medal record

Paralympic athletics

Representing South Africa

Paralympic Games
Bronze medal – third place	2000 Sydney	High Jump - F20

Hein Seyerling is a paralympic athlete from South Africa competing mainly in category F20 high jump events.

Hein competed in Sydney at the 2000 Summer Paralympics winning a bronze medal in the high jump.
