= Alexey Ivanov (athlete) =

Russian Paralympic athlete

Medal record

Paralympic athletics

Representing Russia

Paralympic Games
Silver medal – second place	2000 Sydney	5000 metres - T54

Alexey Ivanov (born 18 April 1979, sometimes transliterated as Alexei or Aleksei/y) is a paralympic athlete from Russia competing mainly in category F56 events.

Alexey has competed at four Paralympics in 1996, 2000, 2004 and 2008. He has competed in various events from 100m up to marathon, pentathlon and shot. He only ever won one medal, a silver medal in the 5000m in 2000.
