= Kobus Jonker =

South African Paralympic athlete

Medal record

Paralympic athletics

Representing South Africa

Paralympic Games
Silver medal – second place	2000 Sydney	Javelin Throw - F27

Kobus Jonker is a paralympic athlete from South Africa competing mainly in category F37 throwing events.

Kobus competed in the 2000 Summer Paralympics in Sydney where, as well as finishing seventh in the discus, he also won a silver in the F37 javelin.
