= Gustavo Ariosa =

Cuban Paralympic athlete

Medal record

Paralympic athletics

Representing Cuba

Paralympic Games
Silver medal – second place	2000 Sydney	Javelin Throw - F54
Bronze medal – third place	1992 Barcelona	Javelin Throw - THW5
Bronze medal – third place	2000 Sydney	Discus Throw - F54

Gustavo Ariosa is a paralympic athlete from Cuba competing mainly in category F54 throwing events.

Gustavo competed in the 1992 Summer Paralympics as a THW5 athlete in the three throwing events winning a bronze in the javelin. After missing the 1996 games, Gustavo returned for the 2000 Summer Paralympics to again compete in all three throws but this time in the F54 category, winning a second bronze in discua and a silver in the javelin.
