= Khadija Jaballah =

Tunisian Paralympic athlete

Medal record

Paralympic athletics

Representing Tunisia

Paralympic Games
Silver medal – second place	2000 Sydney	Discus Throw - F58
Silver medal – second place	2000 Sydney	Shot Put - F58

Khadija Jaballah is a Paralympic athlete from Tunisia competing mainly in category F58 throwing events.

Khadija competed in all three throws at the 2000 Summer Paralympics, winning silver in the discus and shot put.
