= Tahar Lachheb =

Tunisian Paralympic athlete

Medal record

Paralympic athletics

Representing Tunisia

Paralympic Games
Bronze medal – third place	2000 Sydney	Discus Throw - F58

Tahar Lachheb is a paralympic athlete from Tunisia competing mainly in category F58 discus events.

Tahar won the bronze medal in the F58 discus at the 2000 Summer Paralympics. He returned four years later to the 2004 Summer Paralympics but failed to match this achievement in either the discus or the pentathlon.
