= Anna Tavano =

French Paralympic athlete

Medal record

Track and field (athletics)

Representing France

Paralympic Games
Bronze medal – third place	2000 Sydney	1500 metres - T52

Anna Tavano is a paralympic athlete from France competing mainly in category T52 middle-distance events.

Anna competed at the 2000 Summer Paralympics in the 400m, 800m and winning the bronze medal in the 1500m.
