= Danylo Seredin =

Ukrainian Paralympic athlete

Medal record

Paralympic athletics

Representing Ukraine

Paralympic Games
| Silver medal – second place | 2000 Sydney | 1500 metres - T36 |
| Bronze medal – third place | 2000 Sydney | 800 metres - T36 |

Danylo Seredin is a Paralympic athlete from Ukraine competing mainly in category T38 middle-distance events.

Danylo competed successfully in the 2000 Summer Paralympics. Winning silver in the 1500m and bronze in the 800m he was also part of the Brazilian 4 × 400 m relay that was disqualified.
