= Marathons at the Paralympics =

Marathon events have been held at the Summer Paralympic Games, for both men and women, since the 1984 Summer Paralympics in Stoke Mandeville and New York City. They are held as part of the Paralympic athletics programme.

Since the 1996 Games in Atlanta, marathon events, along with all other track events, have been categorised as follows:

- Visually impaired athletes compete in categories T11, T12 and T13, based on their level of disability. Totally blind athletes compete in T11 events, and are permitted to run with a sighted guide. (In 1996 only, the categories were named T10, T11 and T12, and blind athletes were thus categorised "T10".) The marathon for visually impaired athletes is held only for men, and in 2008, no marathon was held in categories T11 or T13, leaving the men's T12 marathon as the sole event for visually impaired athletes. The same was true in 2012.
- Athletes with lower limb amputations, competing with prosthetics, run in categories T42 to T44, depending on their level of disability. In the marathon, athletes in these categories were able to compete only in 1996, when they were grouped together in a single event. The event was held for men only.
- Athletes with upper limb amputations compete in category T46. The marathon in this category exists only for men. In 1996, they ran mixed with lower limb amputees. In 2000, they were awarded their distinct race, which was cancelled in 2004 and restored in 2008.
- Wheelchair athletes compete in categories T51 to T54. These are the only categories open to women as well as men for the marathon. In 2008, three marathons were held in these categories: T52 for men, T54 for men and T54 for women. In 2012, there were only two: the men's T54 and the women's T54.

Heinrich Koeberle of Germany, active from 1984 to 2000, is the most successful Paralympic marathon competitor to date, having won four gold medals and one silver. Among the women, Connie Hansen of Denmark and Jean Driscoll of the United States have each won two Paralympic marathons.

== Results by Games ==
Spurces:

=== 1984 ===
At the 1984 Games in Stoke Mandeville and New York, seven marathons were held for men, and four for women, all for wheelchair athletes. In the men's event 1A, only three runners started the race: Heinrich Koeberle from West Germany, his compatriot H. Lobbering (full name not recorded), and Rainer Kueschall of Switzerland. Only Koeberle reached the finish line. In women's event 5, there were only two competitors, both from Mexico. Both reached the finish line.

Men's events

Event	Gold	Silver	Bronze
Marathon 1A	Heinrich Koeberle; West Germany		
Marathon 1B	J. Matsson; Sweden	Peter Schmid; Switzerland	Ronan Rooney; Ireland
Marathon 1C	Alan Dufty; Australia	D. Wallen; United States	Eduardo Monsalvo; Mexico
Marathon 2	Heinz Frei; Switzerland	Paul Clark; Canada	Graham Condon; New Zealand
Marathon 3	André Viger; Canada	Gregor Golombek; West Germany	R. Sampson; Canada
Marathon 4	Rick Hansen; Canada	Jean Francois Poitevin; France	R. Minor; Canada
Marathon 5	Mel Fitzgerald; Canada	B. Hedrick; United States	Tom Foran; United States

Women's events

Event	Gold	Silver	Bronze
Marathon 2	J. Schiff; United States	Patricia Hill; New Zealand	Dora Garcia; Mexico
Marathon 3	Gabriele Beyer; West Germany	Julie Russell; Australia	D. Smith; Great Britain
Marathon 4	J. Randles; Australia	Kay McShane; Ireland	S. Norman; United States
Marathon 5	Juana Soto; Mexico	E. Belmont; Mexico	

=== 1988 ===
The number of events at the 1988 Summer Paralympics in Seoul was expanded to eleven for men, but restricted to three for women (with category 5 being out).

Men's events

Event	Gold	Silver	Bronze
Marathon 1A	Heinrich Koeberle; West Germany	Rainer Kueschall; Switzerland	Bart Dodson; United States
Marathon 1B	Serge Raymond; Canada	Jan-Owe Mattsson; Sweden	Clayton Gerein; Canada
Marathon 1C	John Brewer; United States	Alan Dufty; Australia	Johann Kastner; West Germany
Marathon 2	Marc Quessy; Canada	Paul Clark; Canada	Michael Trujillo; United States
Marathon 3	André Viger; Canada	Urs Scheidegger; Switzerland	Phil Carpenter; United States
Marathon 4	Jean Francois Poitevin; France	Farid Amarouche; France	Rafael Ibarra; United States
Marathon 5-6	Jonathon Puffenberger; United States	Tom Foran; United States	Georg Schrattenecker; Austria
Marathon A1–3/A9/L1–2	Mustapha Badid; France	Philippe Couprie; France	Ted Vince; Canada
Marathon B1	Joerund Gaasemyr; Norway	David Jakubovich; Israel	Carlos Roberto Sestrem; Brazil
Marathon B2	Stephen Brunt; Great Britain	Paul Collet; France	David Mills; New Zealand
Marathon B3	Carlos Talbott; United States	Mark Farnell; Great Britain	Wieslaw Miech; Poland

Women's events

Event	Gold	Silver	Bronze
Marathon 2	Tami Oothoudt; United States	Ann Walters; United States	Patricia Hill; New Zealand
Marathon 3	Candace Cable-Brooks; United States	Sherry Ann Ramsey; United States	Itsuko Maeda; Japan
Marathon 4	Connie Hansen; Denmark	Tracy Miller; United States	Kay McShane; Ireland

=== 1992 ===
At the 1992 Games in Barcelona, the number of events for men was cut to six: three for wheelchair athletes, and three for visually impaired athletes. The number of events for women was further reduced, down to one, for wheelchair athletes.

Men's events

Event	Gold	Silver	Bronze
Marathon B1	Carlo Durante; Italy	Tofiri Kibuuka; Norway	Steve Brooks; Canada
Marathon B2	Stephen Brunt; Great Britain	José Ortiz; Spain	Paul Collet; France
Marathon B3	Mark Farnell; Great Britain	Anton Sluka; Czechoslovakia	Timo Pulkkinen; Finland
Marathon TW1	Heinrich Koeberle; Germany	Rainer Kueschall; Switzerland	Giuseppe Forni; Switzerland
Marathon TW2	Clayton Gerein; Canada	Christoph Etzlstorfer; Austria	Greg Smith; Australia
Marathon TW3–4	Heinz Frei; Switzerland	Claude Issorat; France	Jeddie Schabort; South Africa

Women's event

Event	Gold	Silver	Bronze
Marathon TW3–4	Connie Hansen; Denmark	Jennette Jansen; Netherlands	Lily Anggreny; Germany

=== 1996 ===
At the 1996 Summer Paralympics in Atlanta, the current categorisation system was introduced. Seven events were held for men, and one for women.

Men's events

Event	Gold	Silver	Bronze
Marathon T10	Harumi Yanagawa; Japan	Carlo Durante; Italy	Nicolas Ledezma; Mexico
Marathon T11	Waldemar Kikolski; Poland	Tomasz Chmurzynski; Poland	Francisco Perez; Spain
Marathon T12	Anton Sluka; Slovakia	Mark Farnell; Great Britain	J. Onofre da Costa; Portugal
Marathon T42–46	Javier Conde; Spain	Joseba Larrinaga; Spain	Mark Brown; Great Britain
Marathon T50	Heinrich Koeberle; Germany	Bart Dodson; United States	Tim Johansson; Sweden
Marathon T51	Brent McMahon; Canada	Clayton Gerein; Canada	Patrick Cottini; United States
Marathon T52–53	Franz Nietlispach; Switzerland	Kazuya Murozuka; Japan	Heinz Frei; Switzerland

Women's event

Event	Gold	Silver	Bronze
Marathon T52–53	Jean Driscoll; United States	Kazu Hatanaka; Japan	Deanna Sodoma; United States

=== 2000 ===
The same number of events (seven for men, one for women) were maintained at the 2000 Summer Games in Sydney.

Men's events

Event	Gold	Silver	Bronze
Marathon T11	Carlos Amaral Ferreira; Portugal	Robert Matthews; Great Britain	Carlo Durante; Italy
Marathon T12	Waldemar Kikolski; Poland	Stephen Brunt; Great Britain	Moises Beristain; Mexico
Marathon T13	Ildar Pomykalov; Russia	Anton Sluka; Slovakia	Roy Daniell; Australia
Marathon T46	Javier Conde; Spain	Mark Brown; Great Britain	Michael Keohane; United States
Marathon T51	Alvise de Vidi; Italy	Heinrich Koeberle; Germany	Thorsten Oppold; Germany
Marathon T52	Clayton Gerein; Canada	Christoph Etzlstorfer; Austria	Thomas Geierspichler; Austria
Marathon T54	Franz Nietlispach; Switzerland	Krige Schabort; South Africa	Heinz Frei; Switzerland

Women's event

Event	Gold	Silver	Bronze
Marathon T54	Jean Driscoll; United States	Kazu Hatanaka; Japan	Wakako Tsuchida; Japan

=== 2004 ===
At the 2004 Summer Paralympics in Athens, the number of events for men was reduced to five (one for totally blind athletes, one for visually impaired athletes, and three for wheelchair athletes), while a single wheelchair event was maintained for women.

Men's events

Event	Gold	Silver	Bronze
Marathon T11	Yuichi Takahashi; Japan	Carlos Ferreira; Portugal	Andrea Cionna; Italy
Marathon T13	Ildar Pomykalov; Russia	Roy Daniell; Australia	Linas Balsys; Lithuania
Marathon T51	Alvise De Vidi; Italy	Stefan Strobel; Germany	Edgar Navarro; Mexico
Marathon T52	Toshihiro Takada; Japan	Thomas Geierspichler; Austria	Clayton Gerein; Canada
Marathon T54	Kurt Fearnley; Australia	Kelly Smith; Canada	Tomasz Hamerlak; Poland

Women's event

Event	Gold	Silver	Bronze
Marathon T54	Kazu Hatanaka; Japan	Wakako Tsuchida; Japan	Cheri Blauwet; United States

=== 2008 ===
At the 2008 Games in Beijing, the number of events for men was again reduced, down to four (one for visually impaired athletes, one for upper limb amputees, two for wheelchair athletes), while a single women's wheelchair event was maintained.

Men's events

Event	Gold	Silver	Bronze
Marathon T12	Qi Shun; China	Elkin Serna; Colombia	Ildar Pomykalov; Russia
Marathon T46	Mario Santillan; Mexico	Tito Sena; Brazil	Walter Endrizzi; Italy
Marathon T52	Thomas Geierspichler; Austria	Hirokazu Ueyonabaru; Japan	Toshihiro Takada; Japan
Marathon T54	Kurt Fearnley; Australia	Hiroki Sasahara; Japan	Ernst van Dyk; South Africa

Women's event

Event	Gold	Silver	Bronze
Marathon T54	Edith Hunkeler; Switzerland	Amanda McGrory; United States	Sandra Graf; Switzerland

=== 2012 ===
At the 2012 Games in London, the number of events for men was once more reduced, down to three (one for visually impaired athletes, one for upper limb amputees, one for wheelchair athletes), while a single women's wheelchair event was maintained.

Men's events

Event	Gold	Silver	Bronze
Marathon T12	Alberto Suarez Laso; Spain	Elkin Serna; Colombia	Abderrahim Zhiou; Tunisia
Marathon T46	Tito Sena; Brazil	Abderrahman Khamouch; Spain	Frederic Van den Heede; Belgium
Marathon T54	David Weir; Great Britain	Marcel Hug; Switzerland	Kurt Fearnley; Australia

Women's event

Event	Gold	Silver	Bronze
Marathon T54	Shirley Reilly; United States	Shelly Woods; Great Britain	Sandra Graf; Switzerland

=== 2016 ===
In Rio de Janeiro, Three men's marathons and two women's marathons were contested on 18 September 2016.

=== 2020 ===
The 2020 Summer Paralympics in Tokyo were postponed due to the COVID-19 pandemic, with the marathon events held on 5 September 2021. The men's marathon was held in the T12, T46, and T54 classifications, and the women's marathon in T12 and T54.

=== 2024 ===
Four marathon events, T12 and T54 for both men and women, were contested on 8 September 2024 in Paris.

== Medal table ==
Rank	Nation	Gold	Silver	Bronze	Total
1	United States (USA)	9	8	10	27
2	Canada (CAN)	9	4	6	19
3	Switzerland (SUI)	5	5	5	15
4	Germany (GER)	5	3	3	11
5	Japan (JPN)	4	6	3	13
6	Great Britain (GBR)	4	6	2	12
7	Australia (AUS)	4	3	3	10
8	Spain (ESP)	3	3	1	7
9	Italy (ITA)	3	1	3	7
10	France (FRA)	2	5	1	8
11	Denmark (DEN)	2	4	0	6
12	Mexico (MEX)	2	1	5	8
13	Poland (POL)	2	1	2	5
14	Russia (RUS)	2	0	1	3
15	Austria (AUT)	1	3	2	6
16	Brazil (BRA)	1	1	1	3
16	Portugal (POR)	1	1	1	3
16	Sweden (SWE)	1	1	1	3
19	Norway (NOR)	1	1	0	2
19	Slovakia (SVK)	1	1	0	2
21	China (CHN)	1	0	0	1
22	Colombia (COL)	0	2	0	2
23	New Zealand (NZL)	0	1	3	4
24	Ireland (IRL)	0	1	2	3
24	South Africa (RSA)	0	1	2	3
26	Czechoslovakia (TCH)	0	1	0	1
26	Israel (ISR)	0	1	0	1
26	Netherlands (NED)	0	1	0	1
29	Belgium (BEL)	0	0	1	1
29	Finland (FIN)	0	0	1	1
29	Lithuania (LTU)	0	0	1	1
29	Tunisia (TUN)	0	0	1	1
Totals (32 entries)		63	66	61	190
