= 2011 IPC Athletics World Championships – Men's 4 × 100 metres relay =

The men's 4 x 100 metres relay events at the 2011 IPC Athletics World Championships were held at the QEII Stadium on 24, 27 and 29 January

== Medalists ==
Class	Gold	Silver	Bronze
T11−13	Russia; Fedor Trikolich; Alexey Labzin; Artem Loginov; Andrey Koptev	Portugal; José Alves; Firmino Baptista; Luis Goncalves; Gabriel Potra	Spain; Martin Parejo Maza; Maximiliano Rodriguez; Xavier Porras; Gerard Desgarrega Puigdevall
T35−38	Ukraine; Andriy Onufriyenko; Sergii Kravchenko; Roman Pavlyk; Mykyta Senyk	China; Mian Che; Wenjun Zhou; Yuxi Ma; Sen Yang	Australia; Evan O'Hanlon; Brad Scott; Wade McMahon; Tim Sullivan
T42−46	South Africa; Samkelo Mike Radebe; Arnu Fourie; David Henry Roos; Oscar Pistorius	United States; David Prince; Blake Leeper; Jim Bob Bizzell; Jerome Singleton	Brazil; André Oliveira; Yohansson Nascimento; Emicarlo Souza; Alan Fonteles Cardoso Oliveira

== T11−13 ==
The Men's 4 x 100 metres relay, T11−13 was held on January 24 and 27

- T11−13
  - T11 = visual impairment - range from no light perception, to light perception with the inability to recognise the shape of a hand.
  - T12 = recognise the shape of a hand, have a visual acuity of 2/60 and/or visual field of less than 5 degrees.
  - T13 = visual acuity ranges from 2/60 to 6/60, and/or visual field of over 5 degrees and less than 20 degrees.

=== Results ===
==== Heats ====
Qualification: First 4 fastest(q) advance to the final.

Rank	Heat	Nation	Athletes	Time	Notes
1	1	Russia	Fredor Trikolich, Alexey Labzin, Artem Loginov, Andrey Koptev	43.04	q
2	1	Portugal	José Alves, Firmino Baptista, Luis Goncalves, Gabriel Potra	44.50	q
3	2	Spain	Martin Parejo Maza, Maximiliano Rodriguez, Xavier Porras, Gerard Desgarrega Puigdevall	46.96	q
4	1	Canada	Richard Carr, Brandon King, Dustin Riley Walsh, Braedon Samuel Dolfo	47.46	q
5	2	China	Pengkai Zhu, Shun Qi, Zhen Zhang, Yansong Li	48.38	
6	2	Kenya	Henry Nzungi Mwendo, Samwel Mushai Kimani, Francis Thuo Karanja, Henry Kirwa	DQ	R 170.14,163.3,170.19

Key: q = qualification by overall place, DQ = Disqualified, R 163.3 = Leaving the lane, R 170.14 = Passing of the baton outside the take-over zone

==== Final ====
Rank	Nation	Athletes	Time	Notes
1st place, gold medalist(s)	Russia	Fedor Trikolich, Alexey Labzin, Artem Loginov, Andrey Koptev	42.99	
2nd place, silver medalist(s)	Portugal	José Alves, Firmino Baptista, Luis Goncalves, Gabriel Potra	44.44	
3rd place, bronze medalist(s)	Spain	Martin Parejo Maza, Maximiliano Rodriguez, Xavier Porras, Gerard Desgarrega Puigdevall	45.45	
4	Canada	Richard Carr, Brandon King, Dustin Riley Walsh, Braedon Samuel Dolfo	46.55	

== T35−38 ==
The Men's 4 x 100 metres relay, T35−38 was held on January 27

- T35−38
  - T35 = good at keeping balanced while still, problems in keeping balance while moving. A shift of centre of gravity may lead to loss of balance. May need assistive devices for walking, not when standing, may have sufficient lower extremity function to run.
  - T36 = walk without assistance or assistive devices, have more control problems with their upper than lower limbs. All four limbs are involved, dynamic balance is often better than static balance.
  - T37 = spasticity in an arm and leg on the same side, good functional ability on the non impaired side, better development, good arm and hand control, walk without assistance.
  - T38 = meet the minimum disability criteria for athletes with cerebral palsy, head injury or stroke. A limitation in function that impacts on sports performance.

=== Results ===
==== Final ====
Rank	Nation	Athletes	Time	Notes
1st place, gold medalist(s)	Ukraine	Andriy Onufriyenko, Sergii Kravchenko, Roman Pavlyk, Mykyta Senyk	45.99	CR
2nd place, silver medalist(s)	China	Mian Che, Wenjun Zhou, Yuxi Ma, Sen Yang	46.03	AR
3rd place, bronze medalist(s)	Australia	Evan O'Hanlon, Brad Scott, Wade McMahon, Tim Sullivan	46.07	
4	Russia	Andrey Zhirnov, Vladislav Barinov, Alexandr Lyashchenko, Roman Kapranov	48.33	
5	South Africa	Andrea Dalle Ave, Dyan Buis, Teboho Mokgalagadi, Fanie Van Der Merwe	DQ	R 170.14, 170.7

Key: DQ = Disqualified, CR = Championship Record, AR = Area Record, R 170.14 = Passing of the baton outside the take-over zone

== T42−46 ==
The Men's 4 x 100 metres relay, T42−46 was held on January 29

- T42−46 = Athletes with amputations or equivalent impairments.

=== Results ===
==== Final ====
Rank	Nation	Athletes	Time	Notes
1st place, gold medalist(s)	South Africa	Samkelo Mike Radebe, Arnu Fourie, David Henry Roos, Oscar Pistorius	42.80	CR
2nd place, silver medalist(s)	United States	David Prince, Blake Leeper, Jim Bob Bizzell, Jerome Singleton	42.84	
3rd place, bronze medalist(s)	Brazil	André Oliveira, Yohansson Nascimento, Emicarlo Souza, Alan Fonteles Cardoso Oliveira	43.43	
4	Germany	Reinhold Boetzel, Heinrich Popow, Markus Rehm, David Behre	45.71	
5	Japan	Hiroyuki Yasui, Jun Haruta, Toru Suzuki, Atsushi Yamamoto	47.40	
6	China	Xu Zhao, Ni Guo, Junfeng Shang, Weizhong Guo	49.81	
7	Australia	Simon Patmore, Michael Roeger, Jack Swift, Scott Reardon	DQ	R 170.5.19.4

Key: DQ = Disqualified, CR = Championship Record

== See also ==
- List of IPC world records in athletics
