= Athletics at the 2004 Summer Paralympics – Men's marathon T11–13 =

Men's marathon T11 at the XII Paralympic Games
- Dates: 26 September
- Competitors: 17 from 10 nations

Medalists
1st place, gold medalist(s)		Yuichi Takahashi	Japan
2nd place, silver medalist(s)		Carlos Amaral Ferreira	Portugal
3rd place, bronze medalist(s)		Andrea Cionna	Italy

The Men's marathon T11 was a marathon event in athletics at the 2004 Summer Paralympics in Athens, for totally blind athletes (running with a sighted guide). Defending champion and world record holder Carlos Amaral Ferreira of Portugal took part, along with sixteen other athletes, from a total of ten countries. No athlete had ever successfully defended his title in the men's fully blind marathon, and Ferreira failed to become the first; he took silver, finishing half a minute behind Japan's Yuichi Takahashi.

The 2004 men's T11 marathon is the most recent to have been held as a distinct event. At the 2008 Paralympics, it was abolished, and athletes categorised T11 (totally blind) were invited to run in the T12 marathon for athletes with severe visual impairment.

== Results ==
Place	Athlete	Time
1	Yuichi Takahashi (JPN)	2:44:24
2	Carlos Amaral Ferreira (POR)	2:45:07
3	Andrea Cionna (ITA)	2:49:59
4	Yoshihide Fukuhara (JPN)	2:53:56
5	Kiyoshi Hoshina (JPN)	2:56:30
6	Jambal Lkhagvajav (MGL)	3:03:03
7	Carlo Durante (ITA)	3:05:01
8	Clemente Esquivel (MEX)	3:20:23
9	Joerund Gaasemyr (NOR)	3:22:41
10	Pablo Astoreca (ARG)	3:30:37
11	Nikolaos Tsatsaklas (GRE)	3:44:39
12	Stergios Sioutis (GRE)	3:47:11
13	Konstantinos Stavridis (GRE)	3:49:26
-	Pedro Acosta (MEX)	dnf
-	Nicolas Ledezma (MEX)	dnf
-	Martin Mosso (COL)	dnf
-	Zhang Zhen (CHN)	dnf

== T13 ==
Men's marathon T13 at the XII Paralympic Games
- Paralympic Athletics
- Dates: 26 September
- Competitors: 19 from 14 nations

Medalists
1st place, gold medalist(s)		Ildar Pomykalov	Russia
2nd place, silver medalist(s)		Roy Daniell	Australia
3rd place, bronze medalist(s)		Linas Balsys	Lithuania

The T13 event, held at the same time as the T11, was won by Ildar Pomykalov, representing Russia.

=== Results ===
Place	Athlete	Time
1	Ildar Pomykalov (RUS)	2:38:45
2	Roy Daniell (AUS)	2:42:17
3	Linas Balsys (LTU)	2:43:55
4	Daniel Ramirez (MEX)	2:44:23
5	Moisés Beristáin (MEX)	2:44:24
6	Paul Pearce (GBR)	2:46:20
7	Joseph L. Ngorialuk (KEN)	2:49:08
8	Jozef Ambroz (SVK)	2:50:38
9	Fabrizio Cocchi (ITA)	2:51:16
10	Aurélio Santos (BRA)	2:51:36
11	Shiro Fukudome (JPN)	2:51:56
12	Mark Farnell (GBR)	2:57:16
13	Nicolai Ciumac (MDA)	3:09:03
14	Zeinolla Seitov (KAZ)	3:13:35
-	Qi Shun (CHN)	DNF
-	Kestutis Bartkenas (LTU)	DNF
-	Igor Lisnic (MDA)	DNF
-	Tomasz Chmurzynski (POL)	DNF
-	Anton Sluka (SVK)	DNF

== See also ==
- Marathon at the Paralympics
