= Athletics at the 2004 Summer Paralympics – Men's 10000 metres T11–13 =

Men's 10,000m races for blind and visually impaired athletes at the 2004 Summer Paralympics were held in the Athens Olympic Stadium. Events were held in two disability classes, each class running a single race.

== T11 ==
Men's 10,000m T11 at the XII Paralympic Games
- Venue: Athens Olympic Stadium
- Dates: 19 September 2004
- Competitors: 13 from 8 nations
- Winning time: 31:37.25

Medalists
1st place, gold medalist(s)		Henry Wanyoike	Kenya
2nd place, silver medalist(s)		Carlos Amaral Ferreira	Portugal
3rd place, bronze medalist(s)		Andrea Cionna	Italy

The T11 event was won by Henry Wanyoike, representing Kenya.

=== Final Round ===
19 September 2004, 19:35

Rank	Athlete	Time	Notes
1st place, gold medalist(s)	Henry Wanyoike (KEN)	31:37.25	WR
2nd place, silver medalist(s)	Carlos Amaral Ferreira (POR)	33:17.30	
3rd place, bronze medalist(s)	Andrea Cionna (ITA)	33:59.98	
4	Yuichi Takahashi (JPN)	34:36.69	
5	Robert Matthews MBE (GBR)	34:47.66	
6	Ricardo Vale (POR)	35:02.93	
7	Nicolas Ledesma (MEX)	35:42.03	
8	Yoshihide Fukuhara (JPN)	35:52.89	
9	Pedro Acosta (MEX)	36:06.13	
10	Martin E. Mosso (COL)	36:39.14	
11	Clemente Esquivel (MEX)	37:05.11	
12	Carlo Durante (ITA)	37:46.96	
	Zhang Zhen (CHN)	DNF	

== T13 ==
Men's 10,000m T13 at the XII Paralympic Games
- Venue: Athens Olympic Stadium
- Dates: 20 September 2004
- Competitors: 17 from 13 nations
- Winning time: 32:02.16

Medalists
1st place, gold medalist(s)		Maher Bouallegue	Tunisia
2nd place, silver medalist(s)		Diosmani Gonzalez	Cuba
3rd place, bronze medalist(s)		Kestutis Bartkenas	Lithuania

The T13 event was won by Maher Bouallegue, representing Tunisia.

=== Final Round ===
20 September 2004, 20:15

Rank	Athlete	Time	Notes
1st place, gold medalist(s)	Maher Bouallegue (TUN)	32:02.16	PR
2nd place, silver medalist(s)	Diosmani Gonzalez (CUB)	32:04.32	
3rd place, bronze medalist(s)	Kestutis Bartkenas (LTU)	32:05.17	PR
4	Noel Thatcher MBE (GBR)	32:20.76	
5	Said Gomez (PAN)	32:28.96	
6	Ildar Pomykalov (RUS)	32:33.55	
7	Moisés Beristáin (MEX)	33:10.22	
8	Daniel Ramirez (MEX)	33:11.79	
9	Qi Shun (CHN)	34:10.63	
10	Fabrizio Cocchi (ITA)	34:16.62	
11	Nicolai Ciumac (MDA)	34:20.88	
12	Vedran Lozanov (CRO)	34:38.54	
13	Igor Lisnic (MDA)	34:41.58	
14	Tomasz Chmurzynski (POL)	34:47.63	
15	German Nava (MEX)	35:54.51	
16	Zeinolla Seitov (KAZ)	37:29.15	
	Linas Balsys (LTU)	DNF	
