= Athletics at the 2008 Summer Paralympics – Men's marathon T12 =

The Men's Marathon T12 was held on September 17 at 7:30.

For the first time, there was no separate marathon held for athletes categorised T11 (totally blind). T11 athletes competed in the T12 marathon, against athletes with severe visual impairment (T12). The fastest finisher among the T11 competitors was Andrea Cionna of Italy, who set a new Paralympic record for his category, but finished in seventh place, six minutes behind gold medallist Qi Shun, who set a new T12 marathon world record.

== Medalists ==
Gold	Qi Shun; China
Silver	Elkin Serna; Colombia
Bronze	Ildar Pomykalov; Russia

== Results ==
Place	Athlete	Class	Final
1	Qi Shun (CHN)	T12	2:30:32 WR
2	Elkin Serna (COL)	T12	2:31:16
3	Ildar Pomykalov (RUS)	T12	2:33:27
4	Abderrahim Zhiou (TUN)	T12	2:35:26
5	Fabrizio Cocchi (ITA)	T12	2:35:27
6	Manuel Garnica Roldan (ESP)	T12	2:36:02
7	Andrea Cionna (ITA)	T11	2:36:43 PR
8	Moises Beristain (MEX)	T12	2:38:17
9	Luis Herrera (MEX)	T12	2:38:50
10	Tomasz Chmurzynski (POL)	T12	2:39:41
11	Diosmany Gonzalez (CUB)	T12	2:39:41
12	Linas Balsys (LTU)	T12	2:39:55
13	Roy Daniell (AUS)	T12	2:40:47
14	Gabriel Macchi (POR)	T12	2:42:06
15	Ihar Barysionak (BLR)	T12	2:42:33
16	Yuichi Takahashi (JPN)	T11	2:43:38
17	Alex Mendonca (BRA)	T12	2:44:50
18	Jorge Pina (POR)	T12	2:48:03
19	Masahito Niino (JPN)	T11	2:51:14
20	Carlos Ferreira (POR)	T11	2:54:40
21	Hirokai Kajisa (JPN)	T12	2:56:31
22	Henrik Ruffel (SWE)	T12	2:57:50
23	Beza Nebeva-Simei (ISR)	T11	3:21:07
24	Alvaro Perez (URU)	T12	3:29:59
	Aurelio Santos (BRA)	T12	DNF
	Henry Wanyoike (KEN)	T12	DNF

== See also ==
- Marathon at the Paralympics
