= Athletics at the 1984 Summer Paralympics – Men's marathon 1A =

Men's marathon 1A at the VII Paralympic Games
- Paralympic Athletics
- Competitors: 3 from 2 nations

Medalists
1st place, gold medalist(s)		Heinrich Koeberle	West Germany

The Men's marathon 1A was a wheelchair marathon event in athletics at the 1984 Summer Paralympics. It was designed for male athletes in category 1A, with the most severe levels of disability. Three runners participated: Heinrich Koeberle from West Germany, and H. Lobbering (full name not recorded), and Rainer Kueschall of Switzerland. Since there were only three participants, all were guaranteed a medal upon finishing the race. However, only Koeberle managed to finish, clocking a time of three hours, forty-one minutes and forty-seven seconds, earning him the gold medal.

== Results ==
Place	Athlete	Time
1	Heinrich Koeberle (FRG)	3:41:47
-	H. Lobbering (FRG)	dnf
-	Rainer Kueschall (SUI)	dnf

Rank	Athlete	Time
1st place, gold medalist(s)	Heinrich Koeberle (FRG)	3:41:47
2nd place, silver medalist(s)	no silver medal awarded	-
3rd place, bronze medalist(s)	no bronze medal awarded	-

== See also ==
- Marathon at the Paralympics
