= Athletics at the 1988 Summer Paralympics – Men's marathon 1A =

Men's marathon 1A at the VIII Paralympic Games
- Paralympic Athletics
- Competitors: 4 from 4 nations

Medalists
1st place, gold medalist(s)		Heinrich Koeberle	West Germany
2nd place, silver medalist(s)		Rainer Kueschall	Switzerland
3rd place, bronze medalist(s)		Bart Dodson	United States

The Men's marathon 1A was a wheelchair marathon event in athletics at the 1988 Summer Paralympics. The race was won by Heinrich Koeberle.

== Results ==
Place	Athlete	Time
1	Heinrich Köberle (FRG)	2:50:39
2	Rainer Küschall (SUI)	2:57:31
3	Bart Dodson (USA)	3:00:41
4	Paolo D'Agostini (ITA)	3:33:58

== See also ==
- Marathon at the Paralympics
