= Athletics at the 2000 Summer Paralympics – Men's 100 metres T42 =

Men's 100 metres T42 at the XI Paralympic Games
- Venue: Stadium Australia
- Competitors: 14 from 11 nations
- Winning time: 12.61

Medalists
1st place, gold medalist(s)		Earle Connor	Canada
2nd place, silver medalist(s)		Lukas Christen	Switzerland
3rd place, bronze medalist(s)		Andriy Danylov	Ukraine

The men's 100 metres T42 took place in Stadium Australia.

There were two heats and one final round. The T42 is for athletes who have an amputation below the knee.

== Heats ==
Qualified for final round

=== Heat 1 ===
Rank	Athlete	Time	Notes
1	Lukas Christen (SUI)	13.40	
2	Andriy Danylov (UKR)	13.42	
3	John Register (USA)	13.85	
4	Akihiro Kojo (JPN)	14.04	
5	Tim Klinker (GER)	14.71	
6	Runar Steinstad (NOR)	15.20	
7	Victor Göransson (SWE)	15.64	

=== Heat 2 ===
Rank	Athlete	Time	Notes
1	Earle Connor (CAN)	12.79	
2	Albert Reed (USA)	13.94	
3	Michael Haraem (GER)	14.39	
4	Darcy Smith (USA)	14.52	
5	Ruben Fuentes (MEX)	16.03	
6	John Eden (AUS)	16.29	
	Hristo Gerganski (BUL)		DNS

== Final round ==
Rank	Athlete	Time	Notes
1st place, gold medalist(s)	Earle Connor (CAN)	12.61	
2nd place, silver medalist(s)	Lukas Christen (SUI)	12.99	
3rd place, bronze medalist(s)	Andriy Danylov (UKR)	13.28	
4	Albert Reed (USA)	13.64	
5	John Register (USA)	14.07	
6	Michael Haraem (GER)	14.15	
7	Darcy Smith (USA)	14.36	
8	Akihiro Kojo (JPN)	14.44	
