= Andrea Cionna =

Italian Paralympic athlete

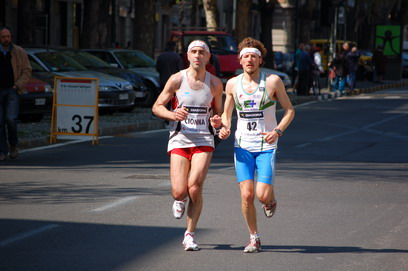
- Andrea Cionna (left) running with his sighted guide

Medal record

Track and field (T11)

Representing Italy

Paralympic Games
| Bronze medal – third place | 2004 Athens | 10000 m |
| Bronze medal – third place | 2004 Athens | Marathon |

Andrea Cionna (born 1968) is an Italian athlete from Osimo in the Province of Ancona. He holds the world record for the fastest marathon run by a totally blind man, set in 2:31:59 in Rome in 2007, and has won two bronze medals in blind long-distance running at the Paralympic Games.

== Biography ==
Cionna first competed at the Paralympic Games in 2004, entering two long-distance events and running with a sighted guide. In the 10,000 metres T11 event for totally blind runners, he finished third in 33:59.98, winning the bronze medal, behind Kenya's Henry Wanyoike (gold) and Portugal's Carlos Amaral Ferreira (silver). In the T11 marathon, he also finished third, in 2:49:59, behind Japan's Yuichi Takahashi (gold), and Portugal's Carlos Ferreira (silver).

He competed again at the Paralympics in 2008, a year after setting a world record in the blind marathon. At the 2008 Paralympics, however, the T11 marathon had been abolished as a separate event, and athletes categorised T11 (totally blind) ran in the same marathon as athletes categorised T12 (partially sighted). Cionna ran fastest of the blind athletes, setting a Paralympic record for his category in 2:36:43, but he finished the race in seventh place, behind six runners categorised T12. The marathon was the only event he entered; the 10,000 metre race was now also a T12 event.

== See also ==
- Marathon at the Paralympics
- Italy at the 2004 Summer Paralympics
