= Athletics at the 1996 Summer Paralympics – Women's marathon T52–53 =

Women's marathon T52-53 at the X Paralympic Games
- Paralympic Athletics
- Dates: 25 August
- Competitors: 18 from 12 nations

Medalists
1st place, gold medalist(s)		Jean Driscoll	United States
2nd place, silver medalist(s)		Kazu Hatanaka	Japan
3rd place, bronze medalist(s)		Deanna Sodoma	United States

The Women's marathon T52-53 was a marathon event in athletics at the 1996 Summer Paralympics, for wheelchair athletes. It was the only women's marathon at this games. The host country, the USA won gold courtesy of Jean Driscoll. Of the eighteen starters, thirteen reached the finish line.

== Results ==
Place	Athlete	Time
1	Jean Driscoll (USA)	1:51:54
2	Kazu Hatanaka (JPN)	1:54:56
3	Deanna Sodoma (USA)	1:56:16
4	Louise Sauvage (AUS)	2:04:45
5	Colette Bourgonje (CAN)	2:12:50
6	Andrea Emmenegger (SUI)	2:13:27
7	Tanni Grey (GBR)	2:13:27
8	Rose Hill (GBR)	2:16:18
9	Rose Winand (USA)	2:18:24
10	Francesca Porcellato (ITA)	2:19:24
11	Mirjana Ruznjak (CRO)	2:25:04
12	Mina Mojtahedi (FIN)	2:31:43
13	Mary Thompson (USA)	3:05:48
-	Chantal Petitclerc (CAN)	dnf
-	Lily Anggreny (GER)	dnf
-	Svitlana Tryfonova (UKR)	dnf
-	Ivanka Koleva (BUL)	dnf
-	Candace Cable (USA)	dnf

== See also ==
- Marathon at the Paralympics
