= Athletics at the 1996 Summer Paralympics – Men's marathon T50 =

Marathon event

Men's marathon T50 at the X Paralympic Games
- Paralympic Athletics
- Dates: 25 August
- Competitors: 7 from 6 nations

Medalists
1st place, gold medalist(s)		Heinrich Köberle	Germany
2nd place, silver medalist(s)		Bart Dodson	United States
3rd place, bronze medalist(s)		Tim Johansson	Sweden

The Men's marathon T50 was a marathon event in athletics at the 1996 Summer Paralympics, for wheelchair athletes. Germany's Heinrich Koeberle defended his marathon title and beat out his rival challenger, the American Bart Dodson. Of the seven starters, three reached the finish line, all of whom won medals as a result.

== Results ==
Place	Athlete	Time
1	Heinrich Koeberle (GER)	2:49:11
2	Bart Dodson (USA)	3:08:26
3	Tim Johansson (SWE)	3:36:41
-	Paolo D'Agostini (ITA)	dnf
-	Giuseppe Forni (SUI)	dnf
-	Alvise de Vidi (ITA)	dnf
-	Fabian Blattman (AUS)	dnf

== See also ==
- Marathon at the Paralympics
