= Athletics at the 1996 Summer Paralympics – Men's marathon T51 =

Men's marathon T51 at the X Paralympic Games
- Paralympic Athletics
- Dates: 25 August
- Competitors: 13 from 9 nations

Medalists
1st place, gold medalist(s)		Brent McMahon	Canada
2nd place, silver medalist(s)		Clayton Gerein	Canada
3rd place, bronze medalist(s)		Patrick Cottini	United States

The Men's marathon T51 was a marathon event in athletics at the 1996 Summer Paralympics, for wheelchair athletes. Canada won gold and silver in this race courtesy of their winning athletes Brent McMahon and Clayton Gerein. McMahon beat Gerein to the winning gold in a photo finish. Of the thirteen starters, twelve reached the finish line.

== Results ==
Place	Athlete	Time
1	Brent McMahon (CAN)	2:07:08
2	Clayton Gerein (CAN)	2:07:08
3	Patrick Cottini (USA)	2:08:31
4	Albert Kovach (USA)	2:08:50
5	Christoph Etzlstorfer (AUT)	2:11:02
6	Franz Weber (SUI)	2:17:53
7	John Clark (USA)	2:20:01
8	Bradley Ramage (USA)	2:23:27
9	Per Vesterlund (SWE)	2:28:04
10	Salvador Hernandez (MEX)	2:40:26
11	Patrick Durand (IRL)	2:48:56
12	Carey Lineham (NZL)	3:29:23
-	Greg Smith (AUS)	dnf

== See also ==
- Marathon at the Paralympics
