= Balsys =

Balsys is the masculine form of a Lithuanian surname. Its feminine forms are: Balsienė (married woman or widow) and Balsytė (unmarried woman). Notable people with the surname include:

- Eduardas Balsys, Lithuanian composer
- Linas Balsys (born 1976), Lithuanian Paralympics athlete
