= Kamis (surname) =

Kamis is the surname of the following notable people:

- Adam Kamis (born 1979), Singaporean para-athlete and motivational speaker
- Auni Fathiah Kamis (born 1991), Malaysian international lawn bowler
- Bengt Kamis (born 1943), Swedish sports shooter
- Fadli Kamis (born 1992), Singapore football defender
- Raudhah Kamis (born 1999), Singaporean football forward
- Rosmin Kamis (born 1981), Bruneian football player
