= RJC =

RJC may refer to:

- Republican Jewish Coalition, a political lobbying group in the United States advocating Jewish support for the Republican Party
- Roda JC, a Dutch football club playing in the Eredivisie
- Raffles Junior College, an independent school in Singapore
- Rosthern Junior College, a high-school in Rosthern, Saskatchewan
