= Rosthern (disambiguation) =

Rosthern is a town in Saskatchewan, Canada.

Rosthern may also refer to:

- Rural Municipality of Rosthern No. 403, in Saskatchewan, Canada
- Rosthern Junior College, an independent high school in Saskatchewan, Canada
- Rosthern-Shellbrook, a provincial electoral district in Saskatchewan, Canada
- Rosthern (electoral district), a former federal riding in Saskatchewan, Canada
- Rosthern (provincial electoral district), a former provincial riding in Saskatchewan, Canada
- HMCS Rosthern, a Canadian navy corvette

== See also ==
- Rostherne, a civil parish in Cheshire, England
