= Samkelo =

Samkelo is a masculine given name. Notable people with the name include:

- Samkelo Mvimbi (born 1999), South African field hockey player
- Samkelo Radebe (born 1989), South African Paralympic sprint runner and high jumper
