= Heinrich Köberle =

German Paralympic athlete (1946–2023)

Personal information
- Born: 11 October 1946
- Died: 15 April 2023 (aged 76) Heidelberg, Germany

Sport
- Country: Germany
- Sport: Paralympic athletics
Medal record
Paralympic athletics
Representing Germany
Paralympic Games
Gold medal – first place	1984 Stoke Mandeville / New York	Marathon 1A
Gold medal – first place	1984 Stoke Mandeville / New York	800m 1A
Gold medal – first place	1988 Seoul	Marathon 1A
Gold medal – first place	1988 Seoul	1500m 1A
Gold medal – first place	1988 Seoul	5000m 1A
Gold medal – first place	1992 Barcelona	Marathon TW1
Gold medal – first place	1996 Atlanta	Marathon T50
Silver medal – second place	1984 Stoke Mandeville / New York	Pentathlon 1A
Silver medal – second place	2000 Sydney	Marathon T51
Bronze medal – third place	1984 Stoke Mandeville / New York	400m 1A
Bronze medal – third place	1984 Stoke Mandeville / New York	Shot put 1A
Bronze medal – third place	1988 Seoul	400m 1A
Bronze medal – third place	1988 Seoul	800m 1A
Bronze medal – third place	1992 Barcelone	5000m TW1

Heinrich Köberle (11 October 1946 – 15 April 2023), was a German athlete. He competed in wheelchair marathons in a handcycle, and won four gold medals in marathons at the Paralympic Games - more than any other athlete. He held the record for the fastest men's marathon in his disability category (the most severe for wheelchair athletes), set in Berlin in 1995, in 2:23:08.

== Biography ==
Köberle first participated in the Paralympic Games when the marathon was introduced in 1984. He competed in category 1A (wheelchair marathon for athletes with the most severe level of disability). Only three athletes began the race, and only Köberle reached the finish line, obtaining his first Paralympic gold medal with a time of 3:41:47.

He defended his title in 1988, in a more competitive event, in which all four starters reached the finish line. Köberle came first, drastically improving his previous performance, completing the marathon in 2:50:39 - almost seven minutes ahead of second-placed Rainer Kueschall (of Switzerland).

In 1992, the number of competitors increased to ten. Köberle won in 2:32:56, this time only twenty-four seconds ahead of Kueschall - but setting a Paralympic record which still stands.

In 1996, he won gold for the fourth consecutive time, in 2:49:11. The slower time was sufficient for gold, as four of his six opponents failed to complete the race. Those four gold medals established a record which remains unbeaten in the Paralympic marathon, in any disability category.

In 2000, he competed for the fifth and final time, and completed the race in 2:48:45, well short of his personal best achieved five years earlier. His performance was sufficient for a silver medal; Alvise de Vidi of Italy won gold, just over a minute ahead of him.

He died in 2023 aged 76.
