= Joan Borrisser =

Spanish Paralympic athlete (born 1990)

Personal information
- Full name: Joan Borrisser Roldán
- Nationality: Spanish
- Born: 17 December 1990 (age 35)

Sport
- Country: Spain
- Sport: Track and field

Joan Borrisser Roldán (born 17 December 1990) is a Spanish track and field sighted guide. He represented Spain at the 2012 Summer Paralympics in this role as a guide for Martín Parejo Maza.

== Personal ==
Borrisser is from the Catalan region of Spain. In 2010, he was a volunteer for the Civil Defence Corps in Sant Fost de Campsentelles. In 2012, he was a 20-year-old student. At the time, he also worked for INEFC of the Municipal Sports School Sant Fost.

== Athletics ==
Borrisser is a guide for visually impaired track and field competitors. In training with a runner, the pair hold a rope to connect them. They do a number of test runs to prevent the rope from tangling and to match pace and stride.

As a 15-year-old, in 2007, Borrisser served as a guide at a race on Gran Canaria. From the Catalan region of Spain, he was a recipient of a 2012 Plan ADO scholarship. Borriser ran with Martín Parejo Maza at June 2012 Spanish championship. Parejo was trying to qualify with Borrisser for the 100 meter event at the June 2012 European Championships in the Netherlands.

Spain's 14 strong visually impaired athletics delegation to the London Games participated in a training camp at the Center for Sports Modernization in La Rioja ahead of the Games. He competed at the 2012 Summer Paralympics as a guide for Parejo who wore bib number 2262. The pair ran in the 100 meter event in London.
