= Athletics at the 2010 Commonwealth Games – Men's 100 metres (T46) =

The Para Sport - Men's 100 metres (T46) at the 2010 Commonwealth Games as part of the athletics programme was held at the Jawaharlal Nehru Stadium on Thursday 7 October 2010.

== Round 1 ==
First 3 in each heat (Q) and 4 best performers (q) advance to the Semifinals

=== Heat 1 ===
Rank	Lane	Name	Reaction Time	Result	Notes	Qual.
1	4	Samkelo Mike Radebe (RSA)		11.31		Q
2	5	Bashiru Yunusa (NGR)	0.199	11.47	PB	Q
3	2	Herman Muvunyi (RWA)	0.166	11.55		Q
4	8	Sandeep Singh (IND)		11.85		q
5	7	Thanuja Nawaratna (SRI)		11.99		
6	6	Raheel Anwar (PAK)	0.391	12.68		
7	3	Ahmad Rafee Arifin (MAS)	0.215	12.74		

=== Heat 2 ===
Rank	Lane	Name	Reaction Time	Result	Notes	Qual.
1	7	Heath Francis (AUS)	0.192	11.39		Q
2	5	David Henry Roos (RSA)	0.163	11.56		Q
3	6	Pathirannahalage Jayathilaka Karuna (RWA)	0.186	11.89	PB	Q
4	2	Stanley Luana (PNG)	0.195	11.94	PB	q
5	3	Jagseer Singh (IND)	0.201	12.01		
-	4	Saidi Segun Adedeji (NGR)	-	DQ		

=== Heat 3 ===
Rank	Lane	Name	Reaction Time	Result	Notes	Qual.
1	6	Olayanju Oluwakolawole Is Abidogun (ENG)	0.191	11.37	PB	Q
2	7	Simon Patmore (AUS)	0.219	11.43		Q
3	3	Shane Spence Hudson (JAM)		11.61		Q
4	2	Jean Claude Ndayisenga (RWA)	0.160	11.66	PB	q
5	4	Markanda Reddy (IND)		11.72		q
6	8	Amos Kalya Kiptum (KEN)		12.51		
7	5	Asghar Ali (PAK)	0.204	12.69		

=== Heat 4 ===
Rank	Lane	Name	Reaction Time	Result	Notes	Qual.
1	3	Ayuba Abdullahi (NGR)		11.58		Q
2	4	Eryanto Bahtiar (MAS)	0.183	11.63	PB	Q
3	5	Gabriel Cole (AUS)	0.198	11.80		Q
4	8	Mohamed Kamara (SLE)	0.245	12.36		
5	2	Mang'eti Wesonga Stephen (KEN)	0.257	12.40		
6	7	Adam Kamis (SIN)		13.17	PB	
7	6	Francis Kompaon (PNG)	0.219	14.04		

== Semifinals ==
First 3 in each heat (Q) and 2 best performers (q) advance to the Final

=== Semifinal 1 ===
Rank	Lane	Name	Reaction Time	Result	Notes	Qual.
1	5	Samkelo Mike Radebe (RSA)		11.28		Q
2	7	Simon Patmore (AUS)	0.196	11.29		Q
3	4	Ayuba Abdullahi (NGR)		11.47		Q
4	9	Shane Spence Hudson (JAM)	0.154	11.59		
5	6	Eryanto Bahtiar (MAS)	0.184	11.59	PB	
6	2	Markanda Reddy (IND)	0.312	11.71		
7	3	Jean Claude Ndayisenga (RWA)		11.86		
8	8	Pathirannahalage Jayathilaka Karuna (SRI)	0.337	11.95		

=== Semifinal 2 ===
Rank	Lane	Name	Reaction Time	Result	Notes	Qual.
1	7	Olayanju Oluwakolawole Is Abidogun (ENG)	0.184	11.32	PB	Q
2	6	Bashiru Yunusa (NGR)		11.36		Q
3	8	Gabriel Cole (AUS)	0.180	11.48		Q
4	9	David Henry Roos (RSA)	0.151	11.52		q
5	4	Herman Muvunyi (RWA)	0.192	11.57		q
6	3	Sandeep Singh (IND)	0.281	11.81		
7	2	Stanley Luana (PNG)	0.213	12.01		
8	5	Heath Francis (AUS)	0.187	27.64		

== Finals ==
Rank	Lane	Name	Reaction Time	Result	Notes
1st place, gold medalist(s)	4	Simon Patmore (AUS)	0.141	11.14	PB
2nd place, silver medalist(s)	7	Samkelo Mike Radebe (RSA)		11.25	
3rd place, bronze medalist(s)	9	Ayuba Abdullahi (NGR)		11.37	
4	3	David Henry Roos (RSA)	0.170	11.46	
5	6	Olayanju Oluwakolawole Is (ENG)	0.218	11.50	
6	2	Herman Muvunyi (RWA)		11.69	
7	8	Gabriel Cole (AUS)	0.332	11.92	
-	5	Bashiru Yunusa (NGR)	-	DQ	False Start
