= Athletics at the 2004 Summer Paralympics – Women's marathon T54 =

== T54 ==
Women's Marathon T54 at the XII Paralympic Games
- Venue: Athens Olympic Stadium
- Dates: 26 September 2004
- Competitors: 17 from 11 nations
- Winning time: 1:49:26

Medalists
1st place, gold medalist(s)		Kazu Hatanaka	Japan
2nd place, silver medalist(s)		Wakako Tsuchida	Japan
3rd place, bronze medalist(s)		Cheri Blauwet	United States

The Women's marathon race for class T54 wheelchair athletes at the 2004 Summer Paralympics followed a course from Marathon to the Panathinaiko Stadium, and started at 08:00 on 26 September. It was won by Kazu Hatanaka, representing Japan.

Rank	Athlete	Time	Notes
1st place, gold medalist(s)	Kazu Hatanaka (JPN)	1:49:26	
2nd place, silver medalist(s)	Wakako Tsuchida (JPN)	1:50:13	
3rd place, bronze medalist(s)	Cheri Blauwet (USA)	1:50:15	
4	Edith Hunkeler (SUI)	1:56:21	
5	Sandra Graf (SUI)	1:59:09	
6	Diane Roy (CAN)	2:02:42	
7	Messaouda Sifi (TUN)	2:06:00	
8	Ivonne Reyes (MEX)	2:06:17	
9	Christie Dawes (AUS)	2:08:25	
10	Souad Chamsi (TUN)	2:08:38	
11	Ajara Mohammed (GHA)	2:08:40	
12	Irina Dezhurova (RUS)	2:09:36	
13	Ariadne Hernández (MEX)	2:14:29	
14	Krisztina Dora (HUN)	2:25:52	
15	Mirjana Ruznjak (CRO)	3:25:22	
	Samira Berri (TUN)	DNF	
	Miriam Nibley (USA)	DNS	
