= Earle Connor =

Canadian Paralympic amputee sprinter

Personal information
- Nationality: Canadian
- Born: July 30, 1976 (age 50) Castlegar, British Columbia
- Height: 173 cm (68 in) (2008)
- Weight: 66 kg (146 lb) (2008)

Sport
- Country: Canada
- Sport: Athletics
- Events: 100 m, 200 m, 400 m, long jump

Achievements and titles
- Paralympic finals: 2008 Summer Paralympics: 100 m T42 – Gold 2000 Summer Paralympics: 100 m T42 – Gold 2000 Summer Paralympics: 200 m T42 – Silver
- Personal bests: 60 m: 7.87 (2006, WR) 100 m: 12.08 (2008, WR); 200 m: 26.40 (2006) 400 m: 1:07.32 (2006)

Earle Connor (born July 30, 1976) is a Canadian retired Paralympic amputee sprinter. Connor holds several athletics world records in the class of T42, or above-knee, amputee.

During his career, Connor was banned twice for anti-doping rule violations.

== Biography ==
=== Early life ===
Earle Connor was born July 30, 1976, in Castlegar, British Columbia to Dave and Diane Connor. Because he was born without a left fibula, his left leg was amputated above-the-knee when he was 3 months old. At the age of 9 months Earle was fitted with his first prosthetic leg.

Growing up in rural Saskatchewan, Connor played all available sports, excelling at hockey, tennis and baseball, and graduated from Rosthern Junior College. Connor was the first amputee ever drafted into the Canadian Junior Hockey system as a goaltender.

=== Paralympic career ===
Connor was inspired by watching television coverage of the 1996 Summer Paralympics to become an amputee sprinter with the goal of competing at the 2000 Summer Paralympics. At the 2000 Paralympics in Sydney, he took gold in the 100-metre final, but finished second in the 200 metres when a misstep on the first corner cost him a few seconds.

He returned to the Paralympics in 2008, winning gold in the men's T42 100 m sprint and setting a new Paralympic record time of 12.32 seconds.

== Anti-doping rule violations ==
In 2004 Connor received a two year competition ban for after testing positive for nandrolone and testosterone, which caused him to miss the 2004 Paralympic Games.

In 2015, Connor received a four year ban after testing positive for the anabolic steroid nandrolone and admitting he had been using it since 2012. He had all of his results disqualified backdated to 2012.

== Awards ==
- 1997: Canadian Disabled Athlete of the Year (also won in 1998 and 1999)
- 2000: ~~inductee, Canada's Sports Hall of Fame~~ *rescinded following positive drug tests
- 2004: ~~award winner, Laureus World Sports Award for Sportsperson of the Year with a Disability~~ *rescinded following positive drug tests
