= Küschall =

Swiss wheelchair manufacturing company

Küschall AG
- Company type: AG
- Industry: Rehabilitation
- Founded: (1978)
- Founder: Rainer Küschall
- Headquarters: Aesch, canton of Basel-landschaft, Switzerland
- Products: wheelchairs
- Number of employees: 80 (2017)
- Website: www.kuschall.com

Küschall AG, headquartered in Aesch, Switzerland, is a wheelchair manufacturing company.

== History ==
=== 1978–1995 ===
The company was founded in 1978 by Rainer Küschall who was quadriplegic. Küschall's first successful model was the "Competition", which featured a new lightweight design. The first products were made at the beginning in the living room by the founder. Later the company moved into a property in Allschwil. In 1986 "Küschall of America" was opened followed two years later by "Küschall of Chile". Both companies, however, were disbanded only a few years later to be able to maintain the short distribution times.

=== 1995 to today ===
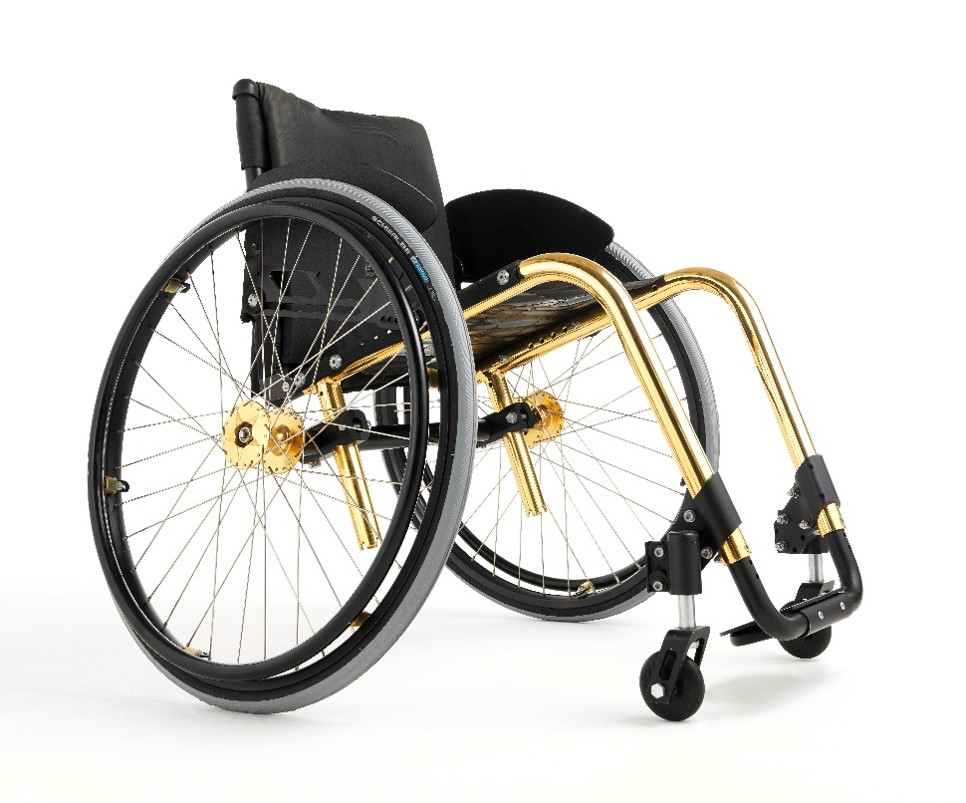
Küschall Competition – the first wheelchair in monotube design, 1985

Since 1995 the company has been a member of the Invacare group and has built its global presence. 2005 the company moved from Allschwil to Witterswil. The new site has been designed for greater production and an increasing number of people and has a modern infrastructure in the newly created Technology Center Witterswil.

== Technology ==
=== Monotube design ===
The Küschall AG released in 1985 the first wheelchair with a minimum frame design on the market.

=== Low Impact System (L.I.S.) ===
In 2007 Küschall launched a shock absorbing module, "LIS" low impact system which was installed in the R33 wheelchair to increase comfort.

=== Vario axle ===
In the late nineties the Vario-axle was released on the market, a model which allowed the camber to be adjusted for the first time.

== Awards ==
In 1985, Rainer Küschall was awarded for the "Competition" wheelchair with the prestigious Designer Award from the Museum of Modern Art in New York (where he is also on display). In 2003 the company won the JB Richey Innovation Award for the wheelchair model "Champion", followed by the Red Dot Design Award in 2004 for the model "Fusion". The Model R33 was awarded for its unique shock absorption system in 2007 with the Janus Award, the Coup de Coeur and 2008 with the Rehacare Best Design Award
