= Switzerland at the 2000 Summer Paralympics =

- IPC code: SUI
- NPC: Swiss Paralympic Committee
- Website: www.swissparalympic.ch

in Sydney
- Competitors: 54
- Medals Ranked 20th: Gold 8 Silver 4 Bronze 8 Total 20

Summer Paralympics appearances (overview)
- 1960; 1964; 1968; 1972; 1976; 1980; 1984; 1988; 1992; 1996; 2000; 2004; 2008; 2012; 2016; 2020; 2024

Switzerland competed at the 2000 Summer Paralympics in Sydney, Australia. 54 competitors from Switzerland won 20 medals including 8 gold, 4 silver and 8 bronze to finish 20th in the medal table.

== Medal table ==
Medal	Name	Sport	Event
Gold	Lukas Christen	Athletics	Men's 200m T42
Gold	Heinz Frei	Athletics	Men's 800m T53
Gold	Franz Nietlispach	Athletics	Men's marathon T54
Gold	Lukas Christen	Athletics	Men's long jump F42
Gold	Urs Kolly	Athletics	Men's long jump F44
Gold	Urs Kolly	Athletics	Men's pentathlon P44
Gold	Ursina Greuter	Athletics	Women's 100m T52
Gold	Beat Schwarzenbach	Cycling	Mixed individual pursuit LC3
Silver	Lukas Christen	Athletics	Men's 100m T42
Silver	Franz Nietlispach	Athletics	Men's 1500m T54
Silver	Franz Nietlispach	Athletics	Men's 10000m T54
Silver	Ursina Greuter	Athletics	Women's 400m T52
Bronze	Giuseppe Forni	Athletics	Men's 1500m T51
Bronze	Heinz Frei	Athletics	Men's 10000m T54
Bronze	Heinz Frei	Athletics	Men's marathon T54
Bronze	Ursina Greuter	Athletics	Women's 800m T52
Bronze	Beat Schwarzenbach	Cycling	Mixed 1km time trial LC3
Bronze	Daniel Kuenzi	Swimming	Men's 200m individual medley SM7
Bronze	Rolf Zumkehr	Table tennis	Men's singles 1
Bronze	Alice Rast	Table tennis	Women's singles 4

== See also ==
- Switzerland at the Paralympics
- Switzerland at the 2000 Summer Olympics
