= Martín Parejo =

Spanish Paralympic athlete

Personal information
- Full name: Martín Parejo Maza
- Nationality: Spanish
- Born: 15 July 1989 (age 36) Sant Fost de Campsentelles, Barcelona, Spain

Sport
- Country: Spain
- Sport: Track and field (T11)
Medal record
Representing Spain
IPC World Championships
Bronze medal – third place	2015 Doha	4 × 100 m relay T11–13
IPC European Championships
Silver medal – second place	2016 Grosseto	Long jump T11
Bronze medal – third place	2012 Stadskanaal	100m T11
Bronze medal – third place	2012 Stadskanaal	4 × 100 m relay T11–13
Bronze medal – third place	2016 Grosseto	100m T11

Martín Parejo Maza (born 15 July 1989) is an athlete from Spain. He has visual impairment and is a T11/B1 type athlete.

== Personal ==
Parejo was born on 15 July 1989 in Sant Fost de Campsentelles, Barcelona. He has a visual impairment. As of 2012 he was residing in Martorelles, Barcelona.

== Athletics ==
Parejo is a T11/B1 type athlete. He uses a guide when competing in the long jump. He is a member of ISS L'Hospitalet Atletisme, an athletic club in L'Hospitalet. Parejo competed at the 2011 IPC Athletics World Championships, earning a bronze medal in the T11-T13 4 × 100 meter relay, while finishing 5th in the long jump and 6th in the triple jump. In the men's visually impaired 4 × 100 meter relay, he competed with Gerard Descarrega Puigdevall, Xavier Porras (T11), and Maximiliano Óscar Rodríguez Magi (T12) and finished in Spanish record national time of 45.45 seconds.

Before the start of the London Games, Parejo trained with several other visually impaired Spanish track and field athletes in Logroño. He competed at the 2012 Summer Paralympics in London, England where he finished 8th in the long jump, tenth in the triple jump and 15th in the 100 meter T11 event. He wore bib number 2262 and ran with guide runner Joan Borrisser Roldan in the 100 meter event in London. In 2012, he was a recipient of a Plan ADO €7,200 athlete scholarship with a €1,200 reserve and a €2,500 coaching scholarship. In July 2013, he participated in the 2013 IPC Athletics World Championships, making the finals for the men's long jump T11. He was also a member of the men's 4 × 100 meter relay team along with Maxi Rodríguez, Xavi Porras and Gerard Descarrega. The team qualified for the final after setting the best time in their semi-final race.
