= Sergii Kravchenko =

Ukrainian Paralympic sprinter

Medal record

Track and field (athletics)

Representing Ukraine

Paralympic Games

Sergii Kravchenko, (Ukrainian: Сергій Кравченко), is a Ukraine Paralympic sprinter who runs in the T37 class. Kravchenko qualified for the 2008 Paralympic Games but did not win a medal. He ran with the Ukraine team to win a gold medal and set a new championship record in the T35-38 4X100 m relay at the 2011 IPC Athletics World Championships.
