= Andriy Danylov =

Ukrainian Paralympic athlete

Medal record

Track and field (athletics)

Representing Ukraine

Paralympic Games
Bronze medal – third place	2000 Sydney	100 metres - T42
Bronze medal – third place	2000 Sydney	200 metres - T42

Andriy Danylov, (Ukrainian: Андрій Данилов), is a paralympic athlete from Ukraine competing mainly in category T42 sprint events.

Andriy first competed in the Paralympics in 1996 chere he competed in the 100m, 200m and long jump. For both the 2000 and 2004 Summer Paralympics he competed in just the 100m and 200m winning bronze in both in 2000.
