= Children of Fire International =

South African charity

Children of Fire International is a charity based in Johannesburg, South Africa, that assists badly burned children with reconstructive surgery and other post-trauma rehabilitation. The organization also promotes legislation and legal assistance for children who are disabled through burn injuries.

In 1997, Children of Fire began as a charitable trust to assist Dorah Mokoena, a South African child who was badly burned and turned away from several hospitals. After an appeal was published in The Times of London, the Dorah Mokoena Trust was formed in London to accept donations and the Children of Fire in South Africa to handle Dorah's rehabilitation. This evolved into Children of Fire International which also assists other children injured by fire globally.

Among many others, Paralympic Gold Medal winner Samkelo Radebe received assistance for surgery and rehabilitation through this group.
