= Samkelo Radebe =

South African Paralympic athlete

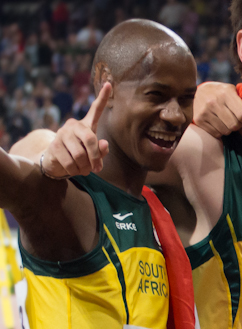
- Samkelo Radebe at the 2012 Summer Paralympics

Personal information
- Born: 8 May 1989 (age 37) Soweto, South Africa
Medal record
Track and field (athletics)
Representing South Africa
World Championships
Gold medal – first place	2011 Christchurch	4 × 100 m T42–46
Commonwealth Games
Silver medal – second place	2010 Delhi	100m T46
Paralympic Games
Gold medal – first place	2012 London	4 × 100 m T42–46

Samkelo Mike Radebe (born 8 May 1989 in Soweto, South Africa) is a South African Paralympic sprint runner and high jumper who competes in the T45 class. He lost both arms in an electrocution accident at age 9 when his kite got caught in electrical wires. The South African organisation Children of Fire assisted with Radebe's rehabilitation after he was injured. He began running in high school in 2003, and studies law at the University of Johannesburg.

Radebe failed to qualify for the 2008 Beijing Games and experienced lower performance levels until 2010 due to shin splints. In 2010 he won the silver medal in the T46 100m race at the Commonwealth Games in Delhi, India, and in 2011 gold as part of the 4 × 100 m relay team in the 2011 IPC World Championships. In the 2012 Paralympic Games, Radebe won a gold medal as part of the South African 4 × 100 m relay team in a world record time of 41.78 seconds.

Radebe has been chosen as Sportsman with a Disability of the Year at both the Ekurhuleni Sports Awards and the Gauteng Sports Awards.
