= Simon Patmore =

Australian Paralympic athlete and snowboarder

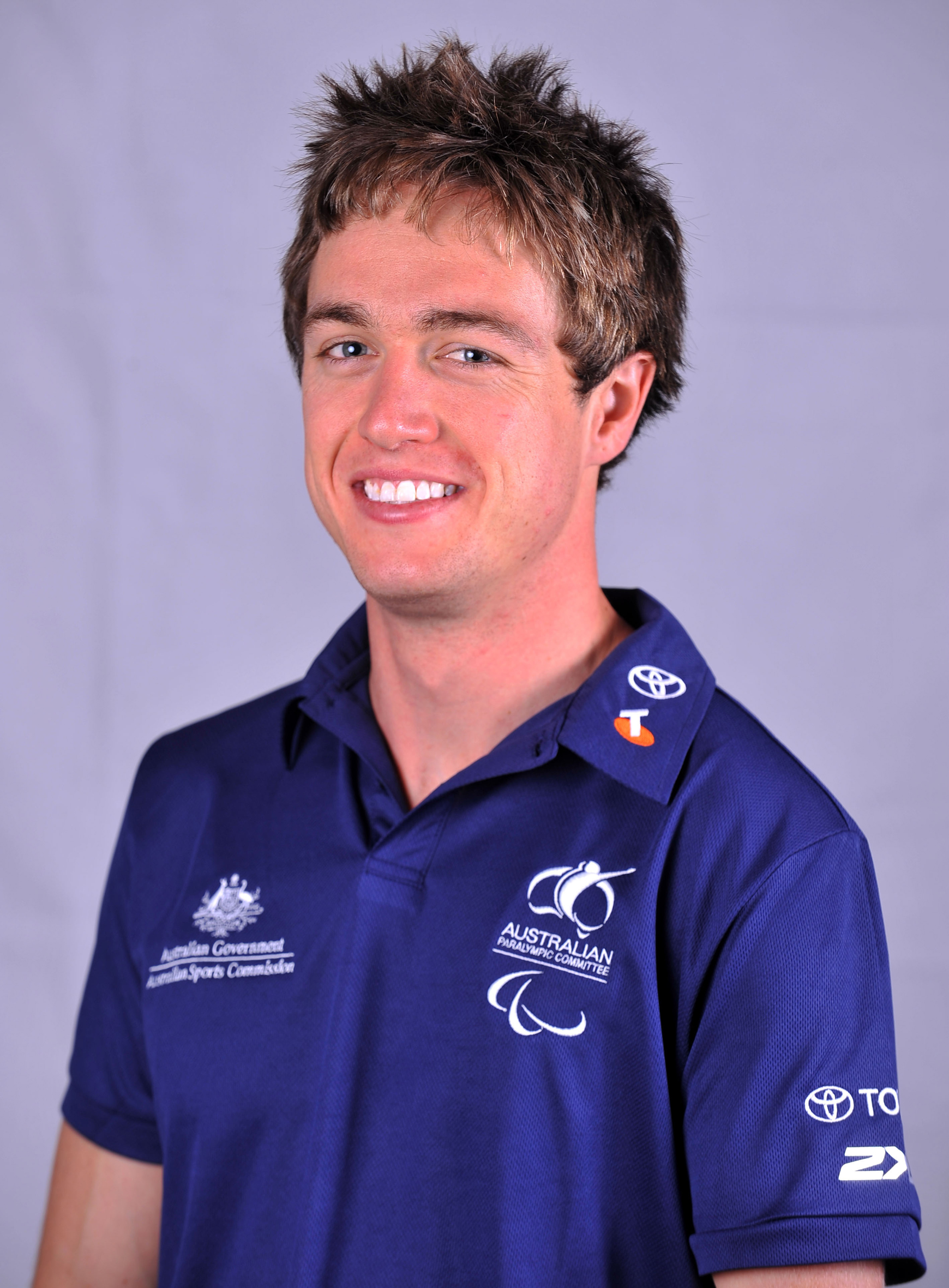
- Patmore in 2012

Personal information
- Nationality: Australian
- Born: 29 August 1987 (age 39)

Sport
- Country: Australia
- Sport: Para-athletics, Para-snowboard
Medal record
Representing Australia
Men's para athletics
Summer Paralympic Games
Bronze medal – third place	2012 London	200m T46
World Championships
Bronze medal – third place	2011 Christchurch	200m T46
Commonwealth Games
Gold medal – first place	2010 Delhi	100m T46
Men's para snowboard
Winter Paralympic Games
Gold medal – first place	2018 PyeongChang	Snowboard Cross SB-UL
Bronze medal – third place	2018 PyeongChang	Banked Slalom SB-UL
World Championships
Silver medal – second place	2019 Pyha	Snowboard Cross SB-UL

Simon Patmore, OAM (born 29 August 1987) is an Australian Para-athletics and Para-snowboard competitor. He won a gold medal in the Men's 100m T46 at the Delhi 2010 Commonwealth Games, and bronze in the Men's 200m T46 at the London 2012 Paralympic Games. At the PyeongChang 2018 Paralympic Games, Patmore won a gold medal in the Men's Snowboard Cross SB-UL and bronze in the Men's Banked Slalom SB-UL.

== Personal ==
Patmore was born on 29 August 1987. He was born with Erb's palsy affecting his left arm.

== Para-athletics ==
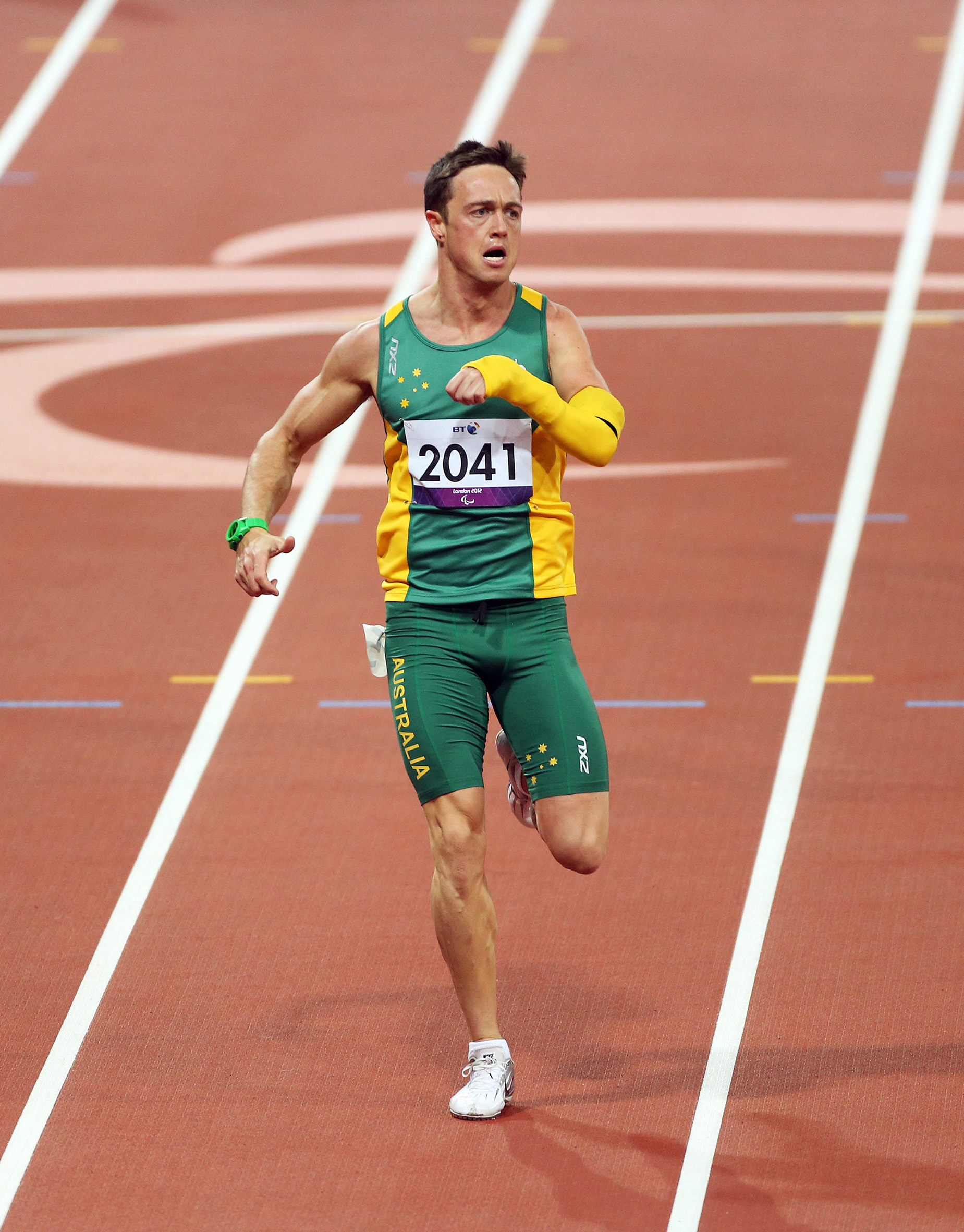
Patmore at the London 2012 Paralympic Games

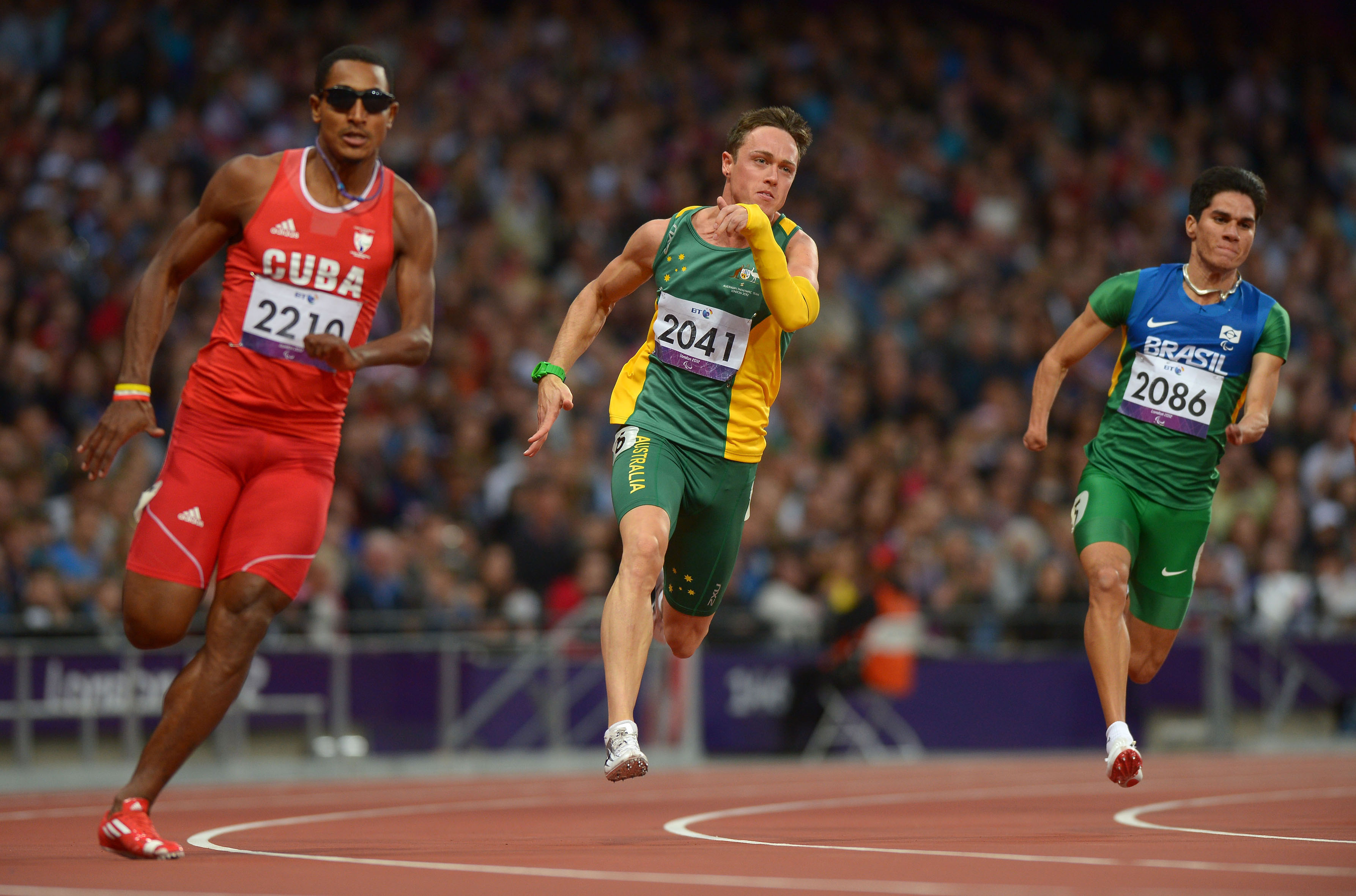
Patmore at the London 2012 Paralympic Games

Patmore is a T46-classified competitor in Para-athletics.

At the Delhi 2010 Commonwealth Games, Patmore won a gold medal in the Men's 100m T46. In April 2011, he competed in the Stawell Gift over 120 metres. At the 2011 IPC World Athletics Championships in Christchurch, New Zealand, Patmore won a bronze medal in the Men's 200m T46 in 22.43 seconds. He won gold over 200m at the 2011 Australian Athletics Championships in Melbourne. At the 2012 Australian Athletics Championships, he won gold over 400m in 51.05 seconds.

Patmore represented Australia at the London 2012 Paralympic Games, where he won a bronze medal in the Men's 200m T46 in 22.36 seconds. He celebrated his 25th birthday on the day of the Opening Ceremony.

Patmore is also a Queensland state record holder.

== Para-snowboard ==
After learning an upper limb impairment class in Para-snowboard would be added to the Paralympic program at the PyeongChang 2018 Paralympic Games, Patmore transitioned from Para-athletics to Para-snowboard in 2014.

Patmore made his World Cup debut in 2014 in Landgraaf, Netherlands, where he placed 10th in the Men's Banked Slalom SB-UL. At the 2017 World Para-snowboard Championships at Big White, Canada, he placed fifth in the Men's Snowboard Cross SB-UL and sixth in the Men's Banked Slalom SB-UL. Patmore is also a Dew Tour silver medallist, Audi Quattro Winter Games silver medallist and dual Para-snowboard World Cup gold medallist.

At the PyeongChang 2018 Paralympic Games, he won a gold medal in the Men's Snowboard Cross SB-UL. With this gold, he became the first Australian to win a Paralympic Winter Games gold medal since 2002, the first Australian man to win a medal at the Paralympic Summer and Winter Games, the first Australian to win a gold medal in Para-snowboard at the Paralympic Games, and the first Paralympic champion in snowboard cross in his classification. He also won a bronze medal in the Men's Banked Slalom SB-UL.

At the 2019 World Para Snowboard Championships, Pyha, Finland, Patmore won the silver medal in Men's Snowboard Cross UL and finished fourth in the Men's Banked Slalom UL.

=== Recognition ===
- 2018 – Ski & Snowboard Australia – Athlete of the Year
- 2018 – Sporting Wheelies and Disabled Association – Open Athlete of the Year
- 2018 – Queensland Academy of Sport Peter Lacey Award for Sporting Excellence
- 2018 – AIS Sport Performance Awards – Para Performance of the Year
- 2020 – Medal of the Order of Australia – for service to snowboarding as a Gold Medallist at the Pyeongchang 2018 Paralympic Games.
