= Tim Johansson =

Swedish Paralympic athlete

Medal record

Paralympic athletics

Representing Sweden

Paralympic Games
Silver medal – second place	1996 Atlanta	400 metres - T50
Silver medal – second place	2000 Sydney	800 metres - T51
Silver medal – second place	2004 Athens	200 metres - T51
Bronze medal – third place	1996 Atlanta	1500 metres - T50
Bronze medal – third place	1996 Atlanta	Marathon - T50

Tim Johansson is a Paralympic athlete from Sweden competing mainly in category T51 wheel chair racing events.

Johansson has competed in four Paralympics, winning medals in three of them. His first games were in 1992 where despite competing in 5 events ranging from the 100m up to 5000m he was unable to win a medal. He followed this up with a silver and 2 bronzes in his next games in Atlanta in 1996 in the 400m, 1500m and marathon respectively as well as competing in the 1500m. At the 2000 Summer Paralympics he competed in the 200m, 400m, 800m and 1500m winning a bronze in the 800m. His fourth and final games came in 2004 where he won a silver medal in the 200m as well as competing in the marathon.
