= Kazu Hatanaka =

Japanese Paralympic athlete

Medal record

Paralympic athletics

Representing Japan

Paralympic Games
Gold medal – first place	2004 Athens	Marathon - T54
Silver medal – second place	1996 Atlanta	10000 metres - T52-53
Silver medal – second place	1996 Atlanta	Marathon - T52-53
Silver medal – second place	2000 Sydney	Marathon - T54
Bronze medal – third place	1996 Atlanta	5000 metres - T52-53

Kazu Hatanaka (畑中 和, Hatanaka Kazu) is a paralympic athlete from Japan competing mainly in category T54 wheelchair racing events.

Kazu competed in the 400m, 800m and marathon at the 1992 Summer Paralympics without any medal success. But in 1996 she won a bronze medal in the 5000m and a silver in the 10000m and marathon as well as competing in the 400m and 800m. The 2000 Summer Paralympics would see her repeat that silver in the marathon while also competing in the 5000m. Doing the same two events in the 2008 Summer Paralympics led to Kazu's first gold medal in the marathon.
