= Maximiliano Rodríguez (runner) =

Spanish Paralympic athlete

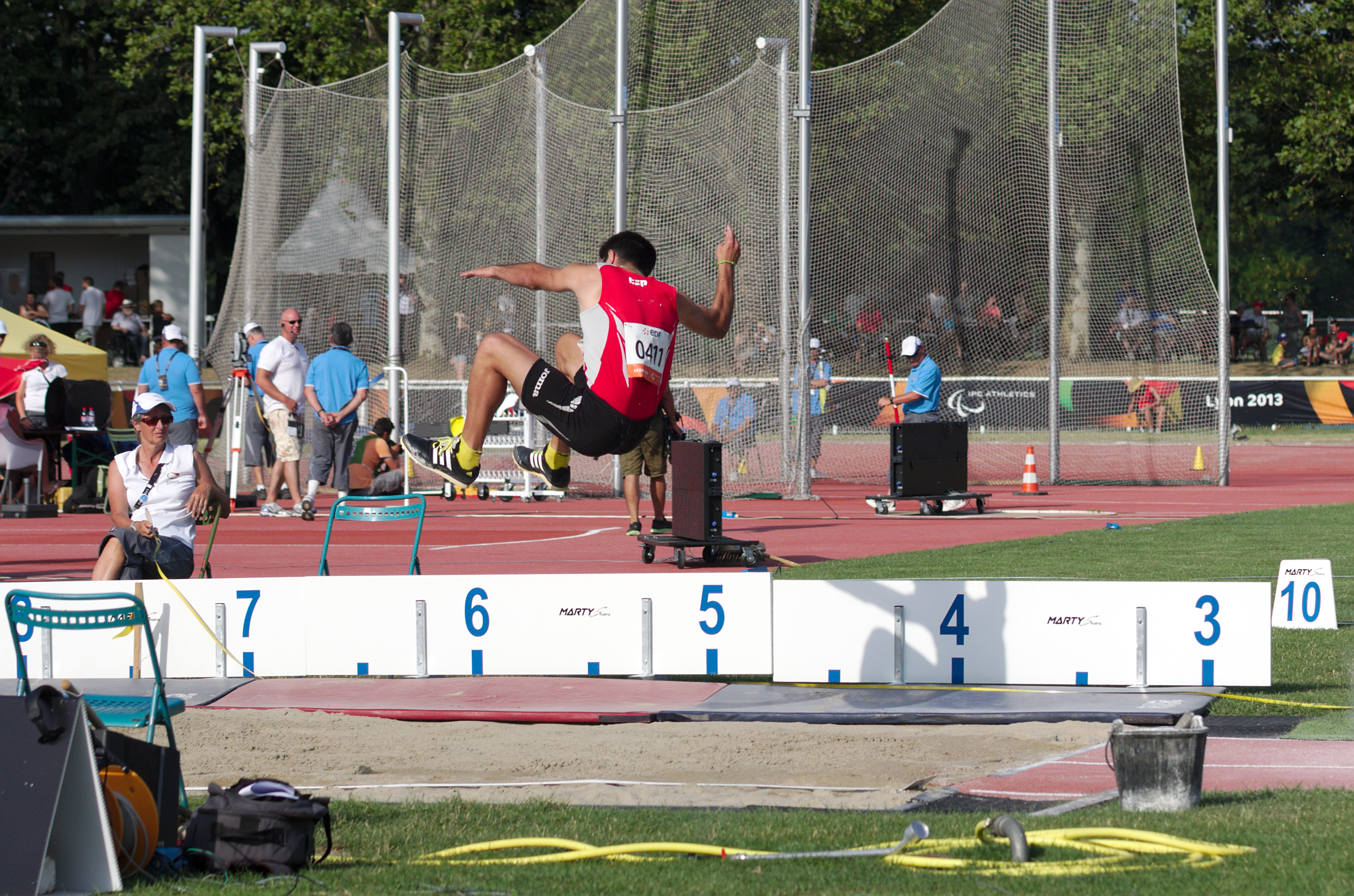

Personal information
- Full name: Maximiliano Óscar Rodríguez Magi
- Nickname: Maxi
- Nationality: Spanish
- Born: 1 March 1988 (age 38) Lanús, Argentina

Sport
- Country: Spain
- Sport: Track and field (T12)

Maximiliano Óscar Rodríguez Magi (born 1 March 1988) is a Spanish athlete who competes in sprinting races. He represented Spain at the 2008 Summer Paralympics and the 2012 Summer Paralympics but did not medal at either event. He has medalled in national competitions, where he represents Galicia.

== Personal ==
Rodríguez was born 1 March 1988 in Lanús, Argentina, and is from Galicia, Spain. He is of Argentine heritage, with his paternal grandmother born in Becerreá and his paternal grandfather born in Taboada. He spent three years living in the country, and is a fan of the Argentine football club Club Atlético Independiente. He played junior football in the country for Sagrado Corazón.

Rodríguez has a disability: he has a vision impairment that manifested when he was a child.

In October 2007, ONCE in Lugo named him the "Sportsman Lucense do Ano and Disability Sport winner". In 2007, he was honoured with a special award for excellence at the Gala do Atletismo Galego. In 2009, the San Fernando Lucus Caixa Rural athletics club gave him an award at a ceremony in a local hotel. In 2012, he resided in Lugo.

== Athletics ==
Rodríguez is a T12/B2 type athlete. He started competing in athletics in his early teens after someone from disability sport encouraged him to take up the sport. Shortly after starting at a competitive level, he competed and won events on the regional and national level and was attempting to qualify for the IPC Athletics World Championships by 2005. From 2005 to 2007, he won a number of medals in national and international athletics competitions.

Rodríguez competed at the 2008 Summer Paralympics in the 100 and 200-meter T12 races and failed to make it out of the qualifying heats in both. He was one of several Galician competitors representing Spain. Competing at the 2010 Celtic Galician Junior Indoor Athletics Championship, he won his group in the 60 meters with a time of 7.26. He competed at the 2010 Spanish Paralympic national championships following selection by the Galician Federation. At the 2011 Spanish Paralympic Athletics Championships where he represented Galicia, he won the 100 and 200-meter events, and the 4 × 100 relay. At the time, he was recovering from an injury that had been affecting him for several months. Competing at the 2011 IPC Athletic World Championships in the men's visually impaired 4 × 100 meter relay with Xavier Porras (T11), Martín Parejo Maza (T11), and Gerard Descarrega Puigdevall (T12) who finished with in Spanish record national time of 45.45 seconds while earning a bronze medal in the event. Prior to the start of the London Games, he trained with several other visually impaired Spanish track and field athletes in Logroño. In 2012, he was a recipient of a Plan ADO €18,000 athlete scholarship with a €3,000 reserve and a €2,500 coaching scholarship.

Competing at the 2012 Summer Paralympics, Rodríguez improved to finished 4th in the 100 meters and was 9th in the semifinal for the 200 meters. He also competed in the 4 × 100 meter T11-T13 relay race, with his team able to qualify for the finals before earning a DNF. He qualified for the 100-meter final on the sixth day of competition. Representing Lugo at 2013 Spanish Paralympic Club Athletics Championships, he won the 100 meter event. In May 2013, he competed in the Spanish national championships, where he earned gold medal in the long jump and 100 meters. In July 2013, he participated in the 2013 IPC Athletics World Championships.
