= Wade McMahon =

Australian Paralympic athlete

Personal information
- Nationality: Australia
Medal record
Athletics
Representing AUS
IPC Athletics World Championships
Bronze medal – third place	2006 Assen	Men's Javelin F37
Bronze medal – third place	2011 Christchurch	Men's 4 × 100 m T35–38

Wade McMahon is an Australian Paralympic athlete who competes in sprinting and javelin events. McMahon had a stroke at birth and has hemiplegia.

McMahon won bronze medals at the 2002 FESPIC Games in the 4 × 400 m relay, Men's Javelin F37 at the 2006 IPC Athletics World Championships and Men's 4 × 100 m T35–38 at the 2011 IPC Athletics World Championships. In 2006, McMahon received the 2006 Sports Achievement Award. At the 2008 Beijing Paralympics, he finished fourth in the Men's Javelin F37/38.
