= Bart Dodson =

American Paralympic athlete

Medal record

Paralympic athletics

Representing United States

Paralympic Games
Gold medal – first place	1984 Stoke Mandeville / New York	Club Throw - 1A
Gold medal – first place	1984 Stoke Mandeville / New York	High Jump - 1A
Gold medal – first place	1988 Seoul	4x100 metre relay - 1A-1C
Gold medal – first place	1988 Seoul	4x100 metre relay - 1A-1C
Gold medal – first place	1992 Barcelona	100 metres - TW1
Gold medal – first place	1992 Barcelona	200 metres - TW1
Gold medal – first place	1992 Barcelona	400 metres - TW1
Gold medal – first place	1992 Barcelona	800 metres - TW1
Gold medal – first place	1992 Barcelona	1500 metres - TW1
Gold medal – first place	1992 Barcelona	5000 metres - TW1
Gold medal – first place	1992 Barcelona	4x100 metre relay - TW1-2
Gold medal – first place	1992 Barcelona	4x400 metre relay - TW1-2
Gold medal – first place	2000 Sydney	200 metres - T51
Silver medal – second place	1984 Stoke Mandeville / New York	200 metres - 1A
Silver medal – second place	1988 Seoul	100 metres - 1A
Silver medal – second place	1996 Atlanta	Marathon - T50
Bronze medal – third place	1988 Seoul	1500 metres - 1A
Bronze medal – third place	1988 Seoul	Marathon - 1A
Bronze medal – third place	1996 Atlanta	800 metres - T50
Bronze medal – third place	2000 Sydney	400 metres - T51

Barton Wane Dodson (April 17, 1958 – April 6, 2024) was an American paralympic athlete. He was from the United States competing mainly in category T51 wheelchair racing events.

== Biography ==
Dodson has been part of five Summer Paralympics, winning twenty medals, thirteen of them gold. His first games were in 1984 where despite competing in the 100m, 200m, 400m and 800m, winning a silver in the 200m it was unusually in the field events where he won gold medals in the club throw and pentathlon in what would prove the only time he competed in the field at the Paralympics. By the 1988 Summer Paralympics, Dodson was competing exclusively on the track competing in every distance from 200m to marathon winning bronze in the 1500m and marathon he was also part of the American gold medal winning relay teams in the 4 × 100 m and 4 × 200 m. 1992 Summer Paralympics would prove to be the apex of Dodson's career as he dominated on the track winning every distance from 100m to 5000m as well as winning two relay golds with the American 4 × 100 m and 4 × 400 m teams. His fourth games in 1996 were not as successful as he only picked up a bronze in 800m and silver in the marathon and missed out on medals entirely in the 1500m and 400m. His last games in 2000 yielded yet another gold medal in the 200m as well as a further bronze in the 400m, this time missing out in the 800m and 1500m.
