= Jean Driscoll =

American wheelchair racer (born 1966)

Personal information
- Born: November 18, 1966 (age 59) Milwaukee, Wisconsin, U.S.
Medal record
Women's wheelchair racing
Representing United States
Paralympic Games
Gold medal – first place	1988 Seoul	4×200 m relay 2–6
Gold medal – first place	1992 Barcelona	4×100 m relay TW3–4
Gold medal – first place	1996 Atlanta	10000 m T52–53
Gold medal – first place	1996 Atlanta	Marathon T52–53
Gold medal – first place	2000 Sydney	Marathon T54
Silver medal – second place	1988 Seoul	4×100 m relay 2–6
Silver medal – second place	1996 Atlanta	5000 m T52–53
Silver medal – second place	2000 Sydney	1500 m T54
Bronze medal – third place	1988 Seoul	200 m 5–6
Bronze medal – third place	1988 Seoul	400 m 5–6
Bronze medal – third place	1996 Atlanta	1500 m T52–53
Bronze medal – third place	2000 Sydney	5000 m T54

Jean Driscoll (born November 18, 1966) is an American wheelchair racer. She won the women's wheelchair division of the Boston Marathon eight times, more than any other female athlete in any division. Her wins in Boston included seven consecutive first-place finishes from 1990 to 1996. Driscoll participated in four Summer Paralympic Games, winning a total of five gold, three silver, and four bronze medals in events ranging from 200 meters to the marathon.

== Childhood ==
In 1966, born with spina bifida, Driscoll grew up in Milwaukee, Wisconsin. She began using a wheelchair in high school and became involved in a variety of wheelchair sports. She was recruited to play wheelchair basketball at the University of Illinois, and while there she also joined the school's wheelchair track and field team. She competed at her first Paralympics in 1988, taking bronze in the 200 and 400 meter races, silver in the 4×100 meter relay, and gold in the 4×200 meter relay.

== Career ==
Her first major win in racing came in 1989, when she beat Candace Cable at the Lilac Bloomsday 12k in Spokane, Washington. Following this success, her coach Marty Morse convinced her to try a marathon. Driscoll participated in the 1989 Chicago Marathon and finished fast enough to qualify for the next year's Boston Marathon. At Morse's urging, she reluctantly agreed to race in Boston; at the time, she was not interested in becoming a regular marathoner and wished to continue racing shorter distances.

Driscoll went on to win the 1990 Boston Marathon in a world best time of 1:43:17, beginning a seven-year winning streak in that race. She set a world record at the 1991 race with a time of 1:42:42, and won her fifth Boston and broke the world record a fifth time in 1994, despite a bout of food poisoning days before the race and stiff competition from Australian Louise Sauvage. With Driscoll's win in 1996, she became the first person to win seven consecutive Boston Marathons. Her streak ended the next year, when her the wheel on her racing chair got caught in a trolley track, causing her to crash and the tire to go flat; Sauvage went on to win the race. At the 1998 race, Driscoll was approaching the finish line in first place when Sauvage sprinted past, winning by half a wheel. Driscoll finished in second place behind Sauvage for a third time in 1999. In 2000, Driscoll won for the eighth and last time, giving her more wins at Boston than any other person.

At the 1992 Paralympics, Driscoll won the gold medal in the 4×100 meter relay and competed in three other events—the 800, 1500, and 5000 metre races. Four years later at the Atlanta Games, she competed in four events and medaled in all of them, taking gold in the 10000 metres and the marathon, silver in the 5000 metres, and bronze in the 1500 metres. She added three more medals to her career total at the 2000 Sydney Paralympics, winning gold, silver, and bronze in the marathon, 1500 metres, and 5000 metres, respectively.

In 2012, she was inducted into the U.S. Olympic Hall of Fame and earlier that year, The Lincoln Academy of Illinois granted Driscoll the Order of Lincoln award, the highest honor bestowed by the State of Illinois.

== Godmother to Mariner of the Seas ==
On September 23, 2003, Royal Caribbean International announced that Jean Driscoll would serve as godmother to the line's then newest ship, Mariner of the Seas, entrusted with blessing the ship before her maiden voyage in November 2003. Driscoll officially gave the ship its name during ceremonies in Port Canaveral, Florida, on Nov. 14, 2003. In a press release by Royal Caribbean, chairman and CEO Richard Fain remarked that "Jean is a true champion who excels in everything she does, in the sports arena and beyond. She has shown by example that physical disabilities need not limit life experiences, and we are proud to have her spirit lead a ship that was designed to ensure all guests can participate fully in the excitement of a cruise experience."

She also became a motivational speaker and international advocate for those with disabilities.

== Philanthropy ==
Driscoll has supported programming for athletes with disabilities by traveling to Ghana, West Africa several times and helping develop the first Paralympic athletes in history from that country. In 2004, Raphael Nkegbe and Ajara Busanga became the first Ghanaian athletes to represent their country in the Paralympic Games and competed in wheelchair track.
