= Brent McMahon (wheelchair racer) =

Canadian Paralympic athlete

Personal information
- Born: January 3, 1966 (age 60) Toronto, Ontario, Canada

Sport
- Sport: Paralympic athletics
Medal record
Men's para-athletics
Representing Canada
Paralympic Games
| Gold medal – first place | 1996 Atlanta | Marathon - T51 |

Brent McMahon (born January 3, 1966) is a former paralympic athlete from Canada.

In 1986 McMahon injured his spine in an automobile accident—and quickly resumed his athletic pursuits. From 1986 to 1995 McMahon played for provincial, national, and state (US) wheelchair rugby teams, leading the Atlanta Rolling Thunder to two National Championships appearances.

McMahon has competed in two Paralympics. He placed first (1996) and fifth (2000) in the marathon, sixth (1996) and eleventh (2000) in the 5000m, and seventh (2000) in the 1500m.

- Atlanta 1996 5000M Marathon — Gold Medal
- Sydney 2000 1500 M 5000 M Marathon

== Personal life ==
McMahon lives in Pawleys Island, SC. He was educated at Carleton University and is the co-founder of Screen 5ive media. He is married to Ann Marie with whom he has a daughter, Connor.
