= Adam Kamis =

Singaporean para-athlete and motivational speaker

Adam bin Kamis (born 11 Mar 1979), also known as Adam1AR, is a Singaporean para-athlete and motivational speaker. Adam participates primarily in the middle-distance events (800m and 1500m) in track and field (classified under T45), ultra-distance running events as well as the multi-disciplinary triathlon (swim, cycle, run).

== Personal life ==
Adam attended Blangah Rise Primary, St. Thomas Secondary and Singapore Polytechnic, where he earned a diploma in Marine Engineering. He was a combined schools athlete in both football and hockey. Thereafter, he was enlisted into the Singapore Armed Forces for National Service, where he received a Sword of Merit in his Officer Cadet Course and was commissioned as a Guards Officer in 2001. In 2003, an unfortunate motorcycle accident led to Adam having one of his arms amputated and the other paralyzed. After a few years of recovery, he finally picked himself up and started participating in competitive sports again in 2008.

== Endurance Athlete Career ==
Adam was first drafted into the national athletics squad in 2008 after his credible showing in the Swissotel Vertical Marathon 2008, where he competed against non-disabled athletes and came in 76th position. After 4 months of training, he participated in the Arafura Games in Darwin, Australia in May 2009 and set Asian records in both the 800m and 1500m, where he earned a medal each for silver and gold. Buoyed by this performance, he earned a silver medal in the ASEAN Para Games in KL, Malaysia in Aug 2009. Switching his focus to the sprint events, he came in runner-up in both the 100m and 200m in the Danish Open Championships in Copenhagen, Denmark. A year later, he came in 6th in the 100m sprint in the Commonwealth Games in Delhi, India.

Eager to challenge himself further, Adam began to train for and compete in multi-sport events. Despite the first 2 legs of the triathlon requiring upper limb control and exertion, Adam managed to overcome these barriers by solely relying on kicking power in the swim leg and riding with a buddy on a tandem bike in the cycling leg. Eventually, he managed to complete the Aviva 70.3 Ironman in Singapore in 2012 which involved a 1.9 km swim, 90 km cycle and 21 km run.

His immediate aims are to qualify for the ASEAN Para Games 2015 and Paralympics 2016, which will be a groundbreaking achievement in the sport of Paralympics triathlon in Singapore.

== Other Physical Endurance Challenges ==
As part of a personal initiative to raise awareness of disability sports, Adam participated in the renowned annual Subaru Challenge, a physical endurance challenge that requires participants to hold a palm onto a part of the car while standing up, 3 times. He managed to last 72 hours in 2014, after unfortunately lifting his arm to scratch his nose due to a miscommunication with the organisers. He has also emerged first in the Nescafe Frappe Hours Chill On Movie Indulgence in 2011, lasting a record 92 hours.

== Motivational Speaking ==
Adam presently conducts motivational workshops and talks for schools, Small Medium Enterprises and Multi-National Corporations.

== Jailed for Vice Offences ==
In early 2013, Kamis set up a social escort agency in order to repay his debts. Although the escort agency is a one-man operation, he posed as a social escort with the agency and got several women who had earlier expressed interest in working as social escorts to perform sexual acts and have sex with him in his Yishun flat. On June 27, 2016, he was sentenced to 38 months jail for vice offences and recruiting a 16-year-old for sexual exploitation.
