= Ildar Pomykalov =

Russian Paralympic athlete

Medal record

Track and field (T12)

Representing Russia

Paralympic Games
Gold medal – first place	2000 Sydney	Marathon - T13
Gold medal – first place	2004 Athens	Marathon - T13
Bronze medal – third place	1996 Atlanta	5000m - T12
Bronze medal – third place	2008 Beijing	Marathon - T12

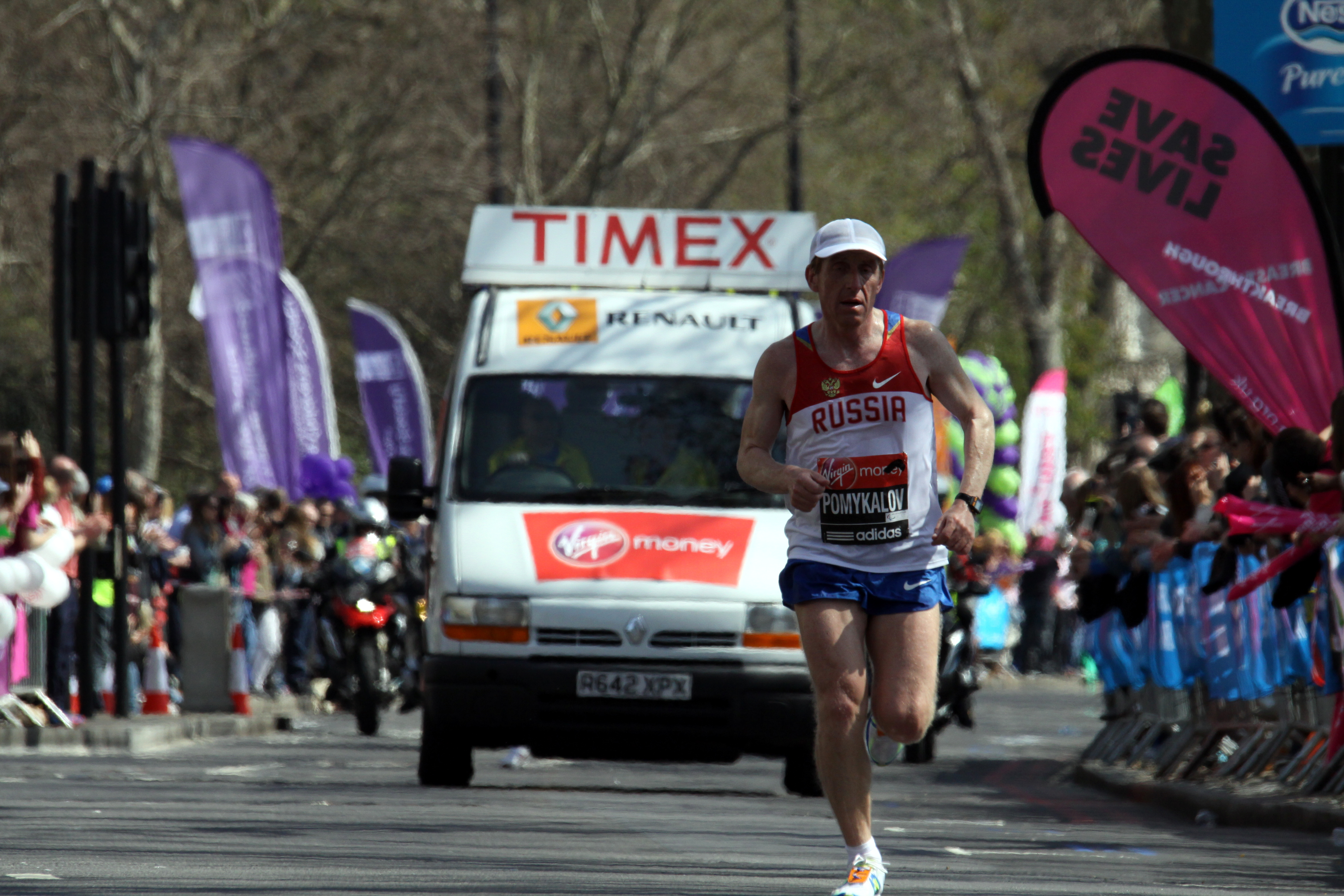
Ildar Pomykalov during 2013 London Marathon

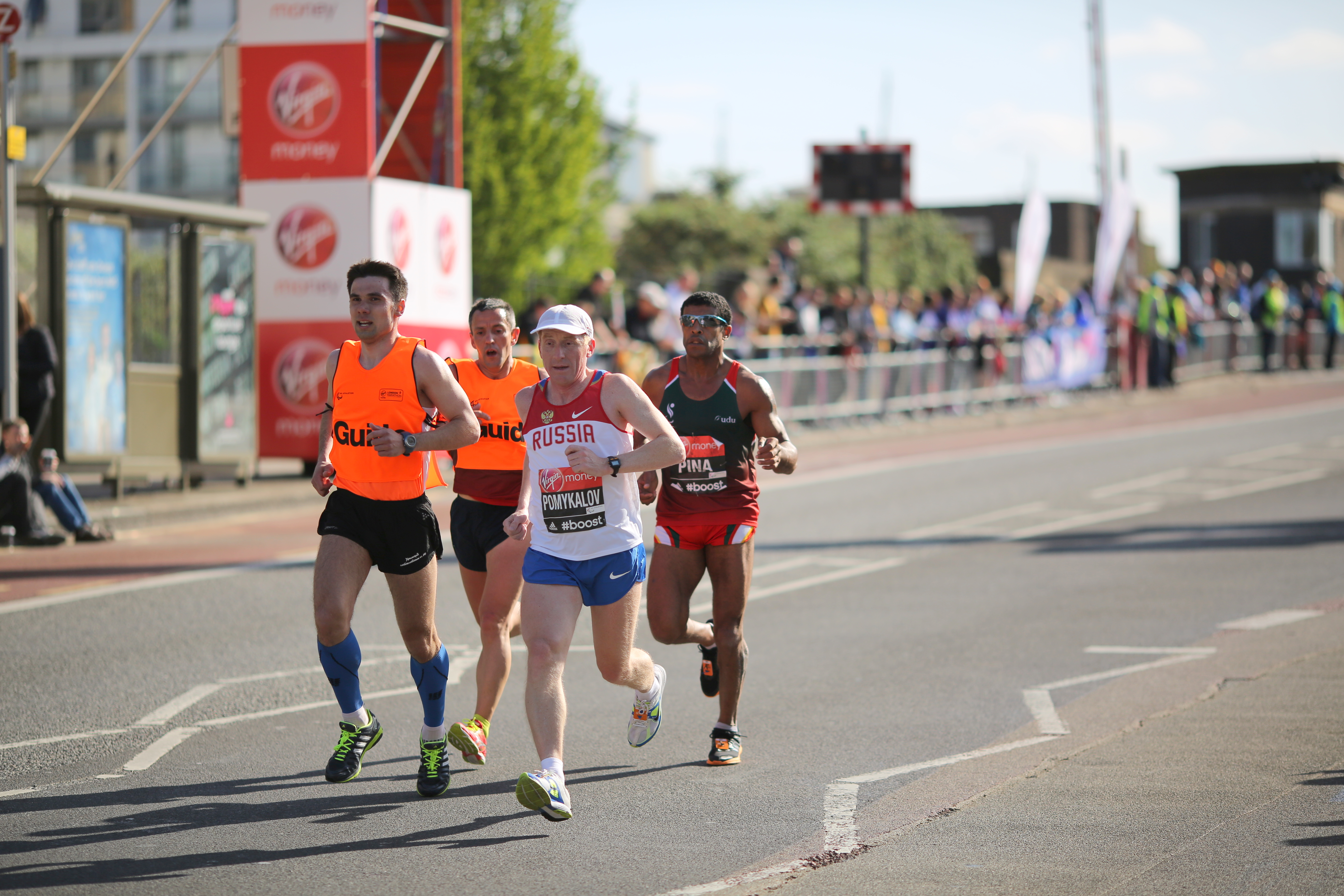
Ildar Pomykalov during 2014 London Marathon

Ildar Pomykalov is a Paralympian athlete from Russia competing mainly in category T12 long-distance events.

== Career ==
He competed in the 1996 Summer Paralympics in Atlanta, United States. There he won a bronze medal in the men's 5000 metres - T12 event, finished fourth in the men's 10000 metres - T12 event and finished seventh in the men's Marathon - T12 event. He also competed at the 2000 Summer Paralympics in Sydney, Australia. There he won a gold medal in the men's Marathon - T13 event. He also competed at the 2004 Summer Paralympics in Athens, Greece. There he won a gold medal in the men's Marathon - T13 event and finished sixth in the men's 10000 metres - T13 event. He also competed at the 2008 Summer Paralympics in Beijing, China. There he won a bronze medal in the men's Marathon - T12 event.
