= Sant Fost de Campsentelles =

- Municipality
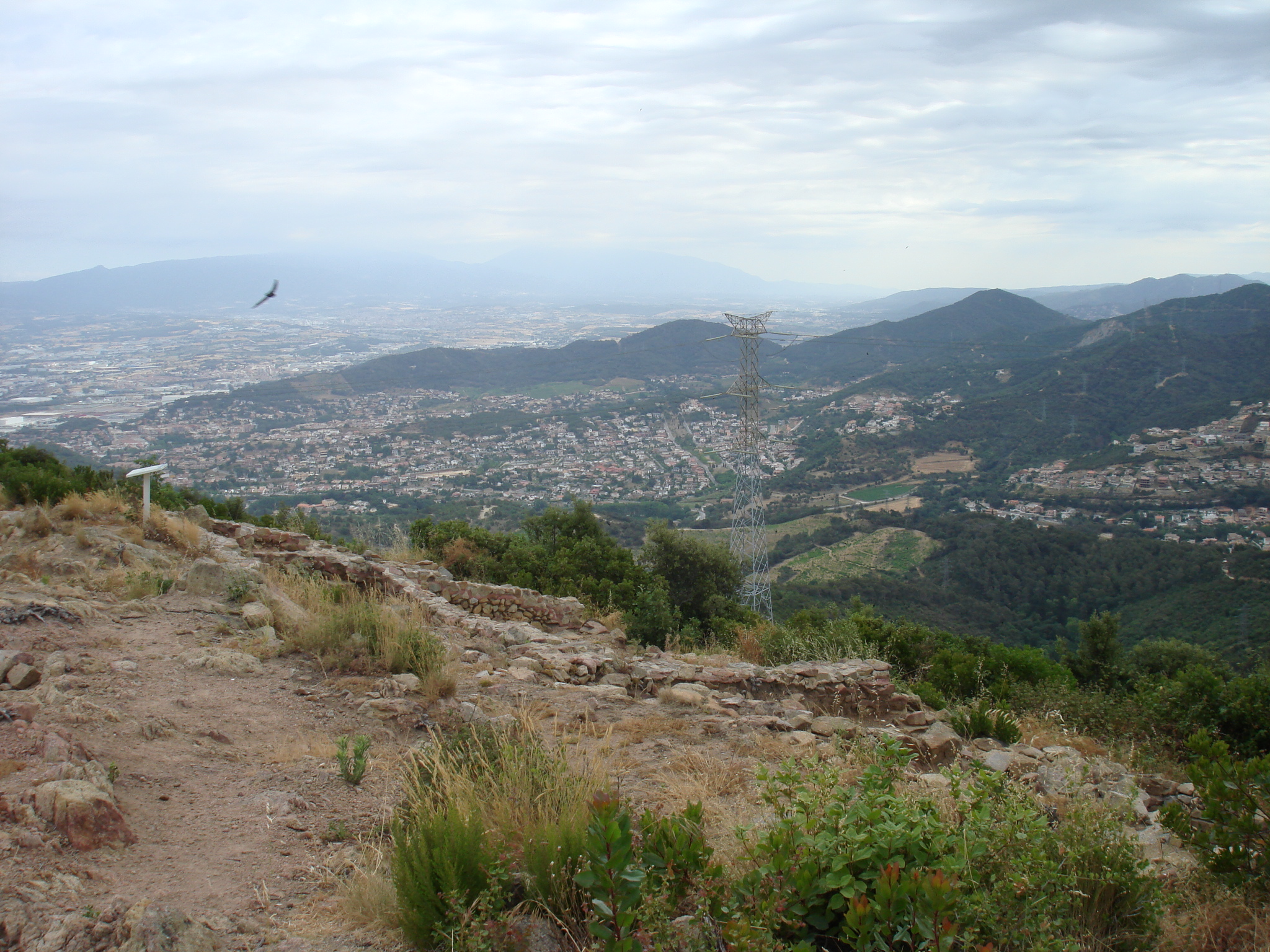
- Sant Fost

- Flag Coat of arms

- Location in Catalonia Sant Fost de Campsentelles (Catalonia) Sant Fost de Campsentelles (Spain)
- Coordinates: 41°30′22″N 2°14′24″E
- Country: Spain
- Community: Catalonia
- Province: Barcelona
- Comarca: Vallès Oriental

Government
  - Mayor: Montserrat Sanmartí Pratginestòs (2015)

Area
  - Total: 13.2 km^{2} (5.1 sq mi)

Population (2025-01-01)
  - Total: 9,419
  - Density: 714/km^{2} (1,850/sq mi)
- Website: santfost.cat

Sant Fost de Campsentelles (Catalan pronunciation: [ˈsaɱ ˈfɔz də ˌkamsənˈtɛʎəs]) is a village in the province of Barcelona and autonomous community of Catalonia, Spain. The municipality covers an area of 13.2 square kilometres (5.1 sq mi) and the population in 2014 was 8,666.
