= Lukas Christen =

Swiss Paralympic athlete

Medal record

Paralympic athletics

Representing Switzerland

Paralympic Games
Gold medal – first place	1996 Atlanta	100 metres - T42
Gold medal – first place	1996 Atlanta	200 metres - T42
Gold medal – first place	1996 Atlanta	Long Jump - T42
Gold medal – first place	2000 Sydney	200 metres - T42
Gold medal – first place	2000 Sydney	Long Jump - T42
Silver medal – second place	1992 Barcelona	100 metres - TS1
Silver medal – second place	1992 Barcelona	200 metres - TS1
Silver medal – second place	2000 Sydney	100 metres - T42

Lukas Christian is a paralympic athlete from Switzerland competing mainly in category T42 sprint events.

== Biography ==
Lukas is a three time Paralympian who in that time has won a total of five gold medals. His first appearance came in 1992 Summer Paralympics where he won silver in both the 100m and 200m for the TS 1 class. He improved in the 1996 Summer Paralympics winning the gold medal in the 100m, 200m and long jump. In the 2000 Summer Paralympics he defended his 200m and long jump titles and managed second place in the 100m.
