= Switzerland at the 1996 Summer Paralympics =

- IPC code: SUI
- NPC: Swiss Paralympic Committee
- Website: www.swissparalympic.ch

in Atlanta
- Competitors: 45 (36 men and 9 women)
- Medals Ranked 18th: Gold 9 Silver 6 Bronze 6 Total 21

Summer Paralympics appearances (overview)
- 1960; 1964; 1968; 1972; 1976; 1980; 1984; 1988; 1992; 1996; 2000; 2004; 2008; 2012; 2016; 2020; 2024

45 athletes (36 men and 9 women) from Switzerland competed at the 1996 Summer Paralympics in Atlanta, United States.

== Medallists ==
Medal	Name	Sport	Event
Gold	Lukas Christen	Athletics	Men's 100m T42
Gold	Lukas Christen	Athletics	Men's 200m T42
Gold	Heinz Frei	Athletics	Men's 1500m T52-53
Gold	Heinz Frei	Athletics	Men's 10000m T52-53
Gold	Franz Nietlispach	Athletics	Men's marathon T52-53
Gold	Lukas Christen	Athletics	Men's long jump F42
Gold	Urs Kolly	Athletics	Men's long jump F44
Gold	Urs Kolly	Athletics	Men's pentathlon P44
Gold	Ursina Greuter	Athletics	Women's 400m T51
Silver	Kurt MacCaferri	Archery	Men's individual W1
Silver	Heinz Frei	Athletics	Men's 800m T52
Silver	Franz Nietlispach; Heinz Frei; Guido Muller; Daniel Bogli	Athletics	Men's 4 × 400 m relay T52-53
Silver	Patrick Stoll	Athletics	Men's long jump F44
Silver	Beat Schwarzenbach	Cycling	Mixed 45/55k bicycle LC3
Silver	Daniel Kunzi	Swimming	Men's 50m butterfly
Bronze	Patrick Stoll	Athletics	Men's 200m T43-44
Bronze	Giuseppe Forni	Athletics	Men's 400m T50
Bronze	Franz Nietlispach	Athletics	Men's 5000m T52-53
Bronze	Heinz Frei	Athletics	Men's marathon T52-53
Bronze	Ursina Greuter	Athletics	Women's 200m T51
Bronze	Ursina Greuter	Athletics	Women's 800m T51

== See also ==
- Switzerland at the Paralympics
- Switzerland at the 1996 Summer Olympics
