= Ursina Greuter =

Swiss Paralympic athlete

Medal record

Paralympic athletics

Representing Switzerland

Paralympic Games
Gold medal – first place	1996 Atlanta	400 metres - T51
Gold medal – first place	2000 Sydney	100 metres - T52
Silver medal – second place	2000 Sydney	400 metres - T52
Bronze medal – third place	1996 Atlanta	200 metres - T51
Bronze medal – third place	1996 Atlanta	800 metres - T51
Bronze medal – third place	2000 Sydney	800 metres - T52

Ursina Greuter is a paralympic athlete from Switzerland competing mainly in category T52 wheelchair racing events.

Ursina has competed in two Paralympics winning six medals. In her first games in 1996 she won the 400m and won bronze medals in the 200m and 800m. In the 2000 Summer Paralympics she just failed to defend her 400m title finishing second to Canadian Lisa Franks but she did win the 100m and also won a second bronze medal in the 800m.
