= Roy Daniell =

Australian Paralympic athlete

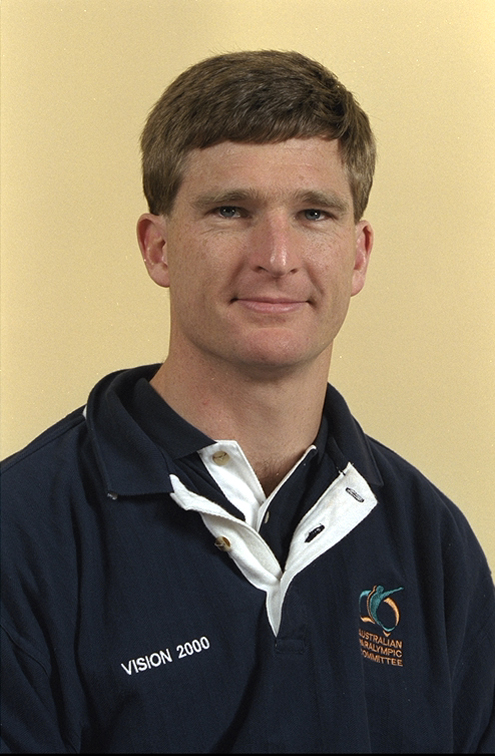
- 2000 Australian Paralympic team portrait of Daniell

Personal information
- Nationality: Australia
- Born: 11 April 1965 (age 61) Seymour, Victoria
Medal record
Representing Australia
Men's para-athletics
Paralympic Games
Silver medal – second place	2004 Athens	Marathon T13
Bronze medal – third place	2000 Sydney	Marathon T13
World Championships
Silver medal – second place	2002 Lille	Marathon T13
Men's paratriathlon
Oceania Championships
Silver medal – second place	2014 Penrith	PT5

Roy Daniell (born 11 April 1965) is an Australian runner with a vision impairment, who has won two medals at three Paralympics.

== Personal ==
Daniell was born on 11 April 1965 in the Victorian town of Seymour and lives in Canberra. He has a genetic condition that causes peripheral vision. Everything in his direct line of sight is permanently blocked by a fuzzy test pattern. He began losing his sight at the age of ten and by the age of fifteen, he effectively could not read. He attended Canberra Grammar School where he was a competitive sprinter and he participated in rowing at national schoolboy competitions.

He is a physiotherapist in Canberra and has a post graduate Diploma in Manipulative Physiotherapy and a master's degree in Pain Management. He is married and has one son and one daughter.

== Career ==
Daniell did not think of himself as disabled until he heard that Sydney was hosting the Paralympics; he began training in 1997 after his eye doctor confirmed that he would be able to qualify for the games. He was originally a triathlete but switched to running after colliding with parked cars and swimming poorly. He won a bronze medal at the 2000 Sydney Games in the Men's Marathon T13 event. He had an Australian Institute of Sport athletics scholarship from 2001 to 2002. At the 2004 Athens Games he won a silver medal in the men's marathon T13 event. In Sydney and Athens he ran without a race guide. He finished 13th in the men's marathon T12 at the 2008 Beijing Games with race guides Julien Wicks and Dennis Fitzgerald. He retired from competition after the 2008 games to spend more time with his family.
