= Rosthern Junior College =

High school in Rosthern, Saskatchewan, Canada

Coordinates: 52.6667°N 106.3453°W

Rosthern Junior College High School is an independent high school in Rosthern, Saskatchewan, Canada since 1905. Opening in that year as the German-English Academy, it was founded by Mennonite settlers in response to a need for trained teachers to work in the schools being established in homestead communities in Saskatchewan. Implicit in this perceived need were concerns among Mennonite settlers for the preservation of culture, religious values and the German language, concerns that arose directly from the pressure in the province (Northwest Territory at the time) to make education English and assimilative.

== Mennonites arrive in Canada ==
Particularly in the 1870s, Mennonites of Dutch-German origins residing in colonies in the Black Sea region of present-day Ukraine became alarmed at the rising nationalism in the Russian Empire. Along with land shortages in these growing colonies, pressure toward Russification of minorities was threatening Mennonite values in education. Similarly, the promise made by Catherine the Great to exempt them from military service was quite clearly being challenged and rewritten by the then current Russian government. Canada was seeking farming immigrants, and about 7,000 Mennonites chose to immigrate to Manitoba where the government of Canada set aside two reserves for their resettlement. In the early 1890s, some of these families decided to move on to Saskatchewan, thereby establishing a trend that would see considerable Mennonite immigration to the Saskatchewan Valley area before the turn of the century. Many came from Manitoba, but others arrived directly from colonies in Russia, from the Danzig region of Prussia and from Kansas, Nebraska and Minnesota where they had settled in the 1870s.

Thriving Mennonite farming communities were quickly established in the Saskatchewan Valley area in the vicinities of Aberdeen, Laird, Waldheim, Langham, Dalmeny, and Rosthern particularly. Churches were established, land was broken and cropped and roads were built.

== Establishing a school ==
In 1903, under the leadership of teacher David Toews, meetings were convened to address the question of education for Mennonite youth in the Valley. Toews was born in the Russian colonies, but did most of his growing up in Kansas where his father eventually became a minister. He came to Canada to study at the already established Mennonite school in Gretna and eventually found his way to the Laird-Rosthern area as a teacher. (A plaque in honour of his efforts to establish Rosthern Junior College is prominent at the school’s entrance today.)

These meetings concluded that there were good reasons for establishing a Mennonite high school, including the preservation of culture and language, the training of teachers for local schools, the vocational training of those not able or inclined to be farmers and, of course, developing spiritual leadership for the growing Mennonite community. The culmination was the rental of a facility in Rosthern in 1905, the hiring of a teacher and the opening of the German-English Academy in November with eight students.

Despite great difficulty in meeting expenses in lean years, the school soldiered on. Toews became its principal, fundraiser and general overseer, and in 1910, a two-story brick schoolhouse was dedicated, followed in 1912 by a girl’s residence. In 1909, the school was incorporated with the province of Saskatchewan as the German-English Academy. Enrollments continued to grow, but during the 1920s & 1930s David Toews found himself expending more and more time and energy appealing for the necessary finances to run the school.

== Expansion ==
By the 1940s, it was apparent that a new, larger school was needed. It was not until 1956, however, that the sod was turned for phase one of the current school plant. The concluding phase of the new school building was completed in June 1963 after a tremendous fundraising drive spearheaded by school president Elmer Richert and secretary-treasurer John R. Dyck. The school now boasted large, bright classrooms, laboratories, a gymnasium, ample office space and a library adequate for the time.

The major development of the 1970s was the construction of new residences. As was the case in the building of the school plant, tremendous effort, primarily on the part of principal Ernest Epp and staff member James Andres, was required to raise funding for this latest construction project, and again the alumni of the school came through with gifts and pledges which, when accompanied by a manageable mortgage, enabled the completion of the current residence facility. Also in the 1970s, the conference of Mennonites in Alberta and the Conference of Mennonites of Saskatchewan (now Mennonite Church Alberta and Mennonite Church Saskatchewan respectively) committed themselves to annual grants toward the operation of the school.

Beginning in 1964 when a newly elected Liberal government announced a per Saskatchewan pupil grant of $85.00 for private high schools, the contribution of the Saskatchewan government to the operation of the school has been crucial. Over time, these grants were increased more or less in keeping with the rising costs of providing education. In 2001, the current government approved the equalization of per pupil grants to all independent high schools, a move that nearly doubled the provincial contribution to RJC High School, so that currently, the provincial grant accounts for 30% of the annual income of the school.

== Course of study ==
RJC’s program of studies has, of course, evolved over the years. When Herman Fast began instructing the first few students in November 1905, the course of studies included Church History, Bible Stories, German Language, Bible Reading and World History. In the mid-1940s, an attempt was made to expand the curriculum to include courses recognized by the University of Saskatchewan so that students could begin their liberal arts education at RJC. A petition to the provincial government to change the name from the German-English Academy to Rosthern Junior College resulted in the present name of the school, although the anticipated elevation to the status of “junior college” in the eyes of the U of S never really materialized.

Today, RJC offers an “education with a plus”, a full high school program augmented by rigorous music, sports and drama programs, outdoor education, a modular vocational program, computer courses, Christian Ethics at all levels and numerous opportunities to develop Christian public service skills and interests through field service and travel. Early classes were taught exclusively in German; today French has replaced German as a second language course in an otherwise all-English curriculum.

Over the past decade, an average of 100 students in Grades 10 to 12 have enrolled at RJC annually. Approximately half of the students have come from Mennonite families in the constituency area of Alberta and Saskatchewan, with the other half made up of students specifying other or no denomination, international students and children of alumni from other provinces. An academic staff of twelve, four residence deans, and a support staff of eight serve the students.
