= Carlos Amaral Ferreira =

Portuguese Paralympic athlete (born 1966)

Medal record

Representing Portugal

Paralympic Games

Track and field (T10/T11)
Gold medal – first place	2000 Sydney	Marathon - T11
Silver medal – second place	2000 Sydney	10000m - T11
Silver medal – second place	2004 Athens	10000m - T11
Silver medal – second place	2004 Atlanta	Marathon - T11
Bronze medal – third place	1996 Atlanta	10000m - T10

IPC European Championships
Bronze medal – third place	2012 Stadskanaal	1500m - T11
Bronze medal – third place	2014 Swansea	5000m - T11

Football
Silver medal – second place	1992 Barcelona	Football 7-a-side

Carlos Amarel Ferreira (born 28 November 1966 in Porto, Portugal) is a Paralympic track and field athlete from Portugal competing mainly in category T10/T11, visually-impaired, long-distance running events.

He competed in the 1992 Summer Paralympics in Barcelona, Spain. There he won a silver medal in the men's Football 7-a-side event. At the 1996 Summer Paralympics in Atlanta, United States, he changed sports to compete in athletics. There he finished sixth in the men's 5000 metres T10 event and won a bronze medal in the men's 10000 metres T10 event. He also competed at the 2000 Summer Paralympics in Sydney, Australia, winning a gold medal in the men's Marathon T11 event and a silver medal in the men's 10000 metres T11 event. He also competed at the 2004 Summer Paralympics in Athens, Greece, winning a silver medal in the men's 10000 metres T11 event and a silver medal in the men's Marathon T11 event.
