= Linas Balsys =

Lithuanian para athlete (born 1976)

Medal record

Paralympic athletics

Representing Lithuania

Paralympic Games
Bronze medal – third place	2004 Athens	Marathon - T13

Linas Balsys (born 1976 in Radviliškis) is a paralympic athlete from Lithuania competing mainly in category T12 long-distance running events.

Linas has competed in three Paralympics, winning a bronze medal. He first competed in the 2000 Summer Paralympics in the T13 5000m and marathon without any medal success. He returned four years later in 2004 where he competed in the 5000m, 10000m and won a bronze medal in the Marathon. He could not match this achievement in the 2008 Summer Paralympics failing to finish in the 10000m and only managing twelfth in the marathon.
