= Rainer Küschall =

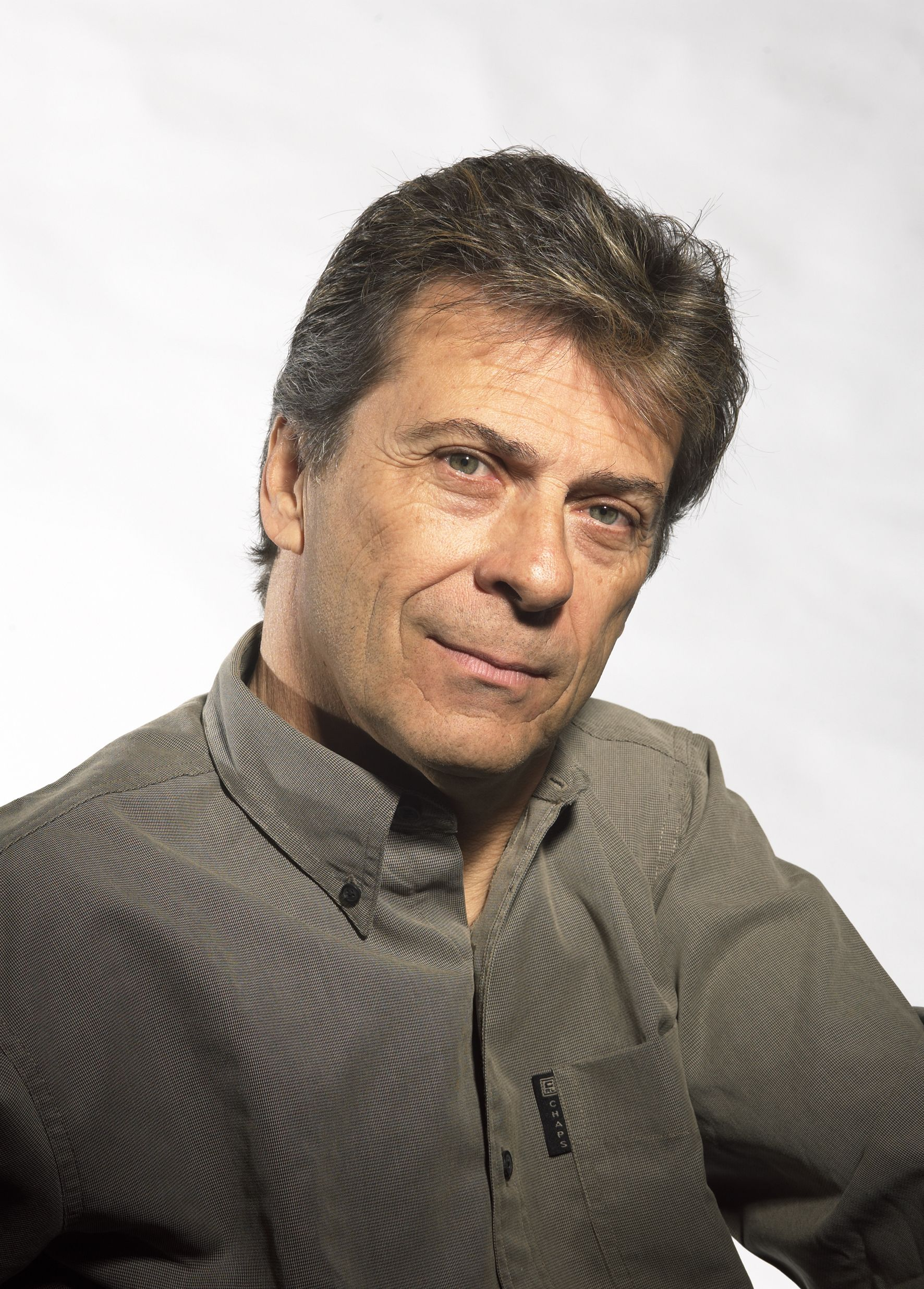

Personal information
- Born: 17 April 1947 (age 79) Flims

Sport
- Country: Switzerland
- Sport: Wheelchair racing, Table tennis
Medal record
Men's athletics
Representing Switzerland
Paralympic Games
Gold medal – first place	1972 Heidelberg	Table tennis (Double)
Gold medal – first place	1972 Heidelberg	Table tennis (Team)
Gold medal – first place	1976 Toronto	Table tennis
Gold medal – first place	1984 Stoke Mandeville	Wheelchair racing (200 m)
Gold medal – first place	1984 Stoke Mandeville	Wheelchair racing (400 m)
Silver medal – second place	1976 Toronto	Table tennis
Silver medal – second place	1984 Stoke Mandeville	Wheelchair racing (100 m)
Silver medal – second place	1984 Stoke Mandeville	Wheelchair racing (4x100 m)
Silver medal – second place	1988 Seoul	Wheelchair racing (4x200 m)
Silver medal – second place	1988 Seoul	Wheelchair racing (Marathon)
Silver medal – second place	1992 Barcelona	Wheelchair racing (1500 m)
Silver medal – second place	1992 Barcelona	Wheelchair racing (4x400 m)]
Silver medal – second place	1992 Barcelona	Wheelchair racing (5000 m)
Silver medal – second place	1992 Barcelona	Wheelchair racing (800 m)
Silver medal – second place	1992 Barcelona	Wheelchair racing (Marathon)
Bronze medal – third place	1968 Tel Aviv	Table tennis (Double)
Bronze medal – third place	1972 Heidelberg	Table tennis (Single)
Bronze medal – third place	1984 Stoke Mandeville	Wheelchair racing (800 m)
Bronze medal – third place	1988 Seoul	Wheelchair racing (100 m)
Bronze medal – third place	1992 Barcelona	Wheelchair racing (400 m)
IPC Athletics World Championships
Gold medal – first place	1982 Stoke Mandeville	Table tennis (200 m)
Gold medal – first place	1983 Stoke Mandeville	Wheelchair racing (100 m)
Gold medal – first place	1985 Stoke Mandeville	Wheelchair racing (100 m)
Gold medal – first place	1985 Stoke Mandeville	Wheelchair racing (200 m)
Gold medal – first place	1985 Stoke Mandeville	Wheelchair racing (400 m)
Silver medal – second place	1979 Stoke Mandeville	Table tennis (Single)
Silver medal – second place	1981 Stoke Mandeville	Wheelchair racing (100 m)
Silver medal – second place	1983 Stoke Mandeville	Wheelchair racing (200 m)
Silver medal – second place	1983 Stoke Mandeville	Wheelchair racing (Slalom)
Silver medal – second place	1985 Stoke Mandeville	Wheelchair racing (800 m)
Silver medal – second place	1986 Gothenburg	Wheelchair racing (200 m)
Silver medal – second place	1990 Assen	Wheelchair racing (800 m)
Silver medal – second place	1990 Assen	Wheelchair racing (Marathon)
Bronze medal – third place	1974 Stoke Mandeville	Wheelchair racing (?)
Bronze medal – third place	1974 Stoke Mandeville	Wheelchair racing (Slalom)
Bronze medal – third place	1974 Stoke Mandeville	Table tennis (Single)
Bronze medal – third place	1979 Stoke Mandeville	Wheelchair racing (Slalom)
Bronze medal – third place	1979 Stoke Mandeville	Wheelchair racing (Slalom)
Bronze medal – third place	1983 Stoke Mandeville	Wheelchair racing (400 m)
Bronze medal – third place	1986 Gothenburg	Wheelchair racing (100 m)
Bronze medal – third place	1986 Gothenburg	Wheelchair racing (400 m)
Bronze medal – third place	1986 Gothenburg	Wheelchair racing (800 m)
Bronze medal – third place	1990 Assen	Wheelchair racing (400 m)
European Championships
Bronze medal – third place	1983 Ingoldstadt	Table tennis (Double)
- Updated on 6 July 2015

Rainer Küschall (born 17 April 1947 in Flims, Switzerland) is a Swiss tetraplegic, car racer, inventor and designer.

== Accident ==
At the age of 16, Küschall sustained a severe injury to his cervical spine at the level of the C4-C6 vertebrae. At the time, there was no treatment available for quadriplegia, and he spent the following two years bedbound in different hospitals. Küschall then met the neurologist and neurosurgeon Ludwig Guttmann who founded Stoke Mandeville Hospital. Guttmann was the first to place Küschall into a wheelchair and a difficult period of rehabilitation followed.

== Career ==
After many years of rehabilitation and sports, Küschall started his first job as an office clerk in 1976. However, this work proved impossible for him and he left after two weeks. At home, Küschall tinkered around with an old wheelchair and improved it with a few essential changes. This eventually led him to establish Küschall AG. Küschall began serial production of wheelchairs in 1976 – first in his living room, later in a factory. After a severe infection which caused a coma, Küschall sold his company to Invacare, a major medical equipment manufacturer based in the US, in 1996. After several years Küschall recovered and took on the responsibility for engineering and product development as the company's research and development director.

== Invention of the monotube designs ==
Until the 1980s, wheelchairs were heavy vehicles which were almost impossible for the patient themselves to manoeuvre. In 1985, Rainer Küschall designed a completely new wheelchair which only weighed 14 instead of the usual 25 kilograms and had a volume that was 40% smaller. By reducing the weight and adding new adjustment possibilities for seated positions, Küschall increased the range of uses and the mobility of the wheelchair and established the now common monotube design. The product, which he called the Competition (known as Champion 3000 in the USA), was revolutionary at the time and is still one of the most copied basic designs for wheelchairs today. In 1986, Küschall received the award of the Museum of Modern Art. The Competition wheelchair was the first medical device added to the collection at the MoMA and is still exhibited there. One of its successor models weighs only 6.7 kilograms.

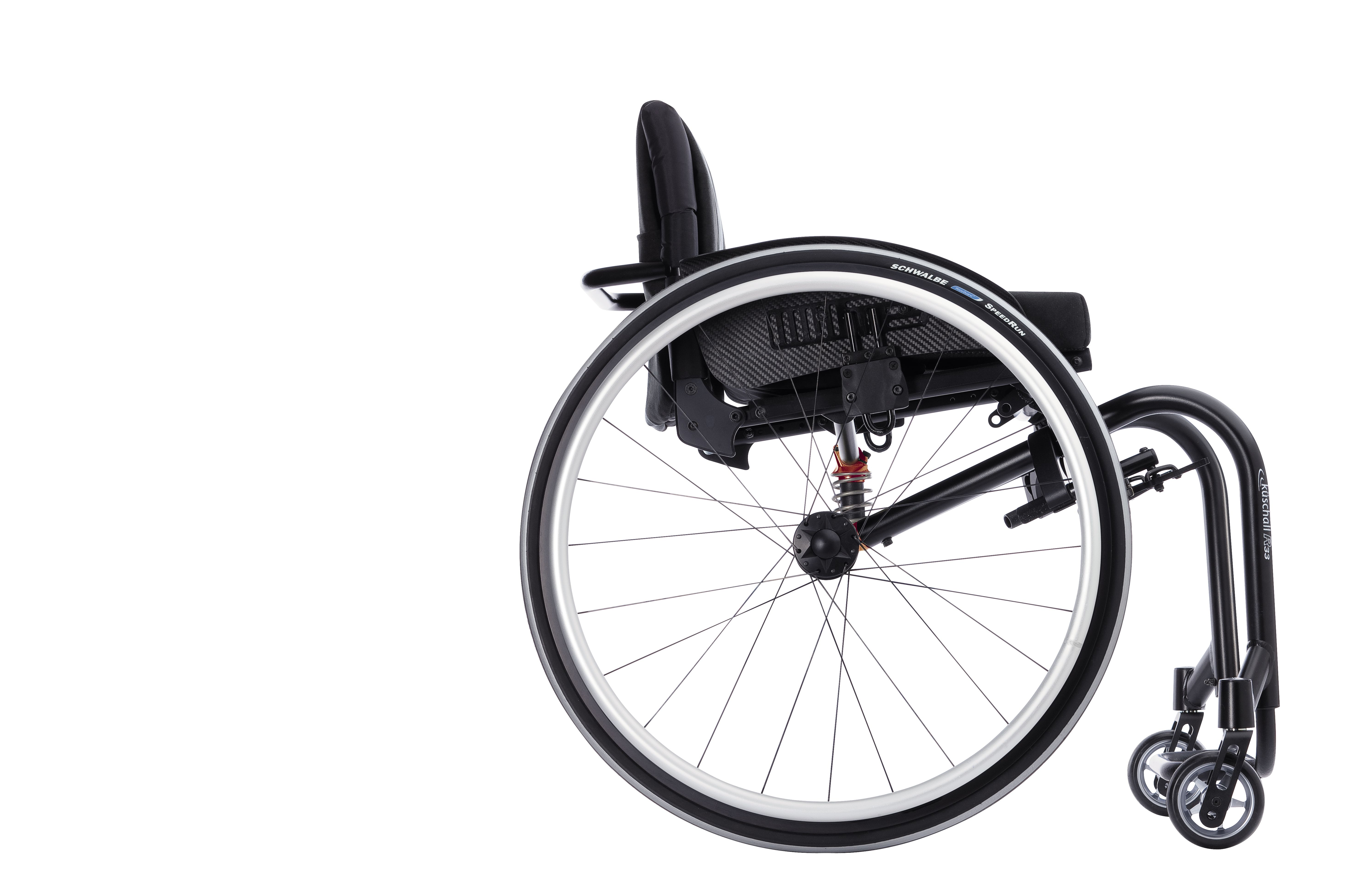
Active wheelchair from Küschall in the Monotube-Design

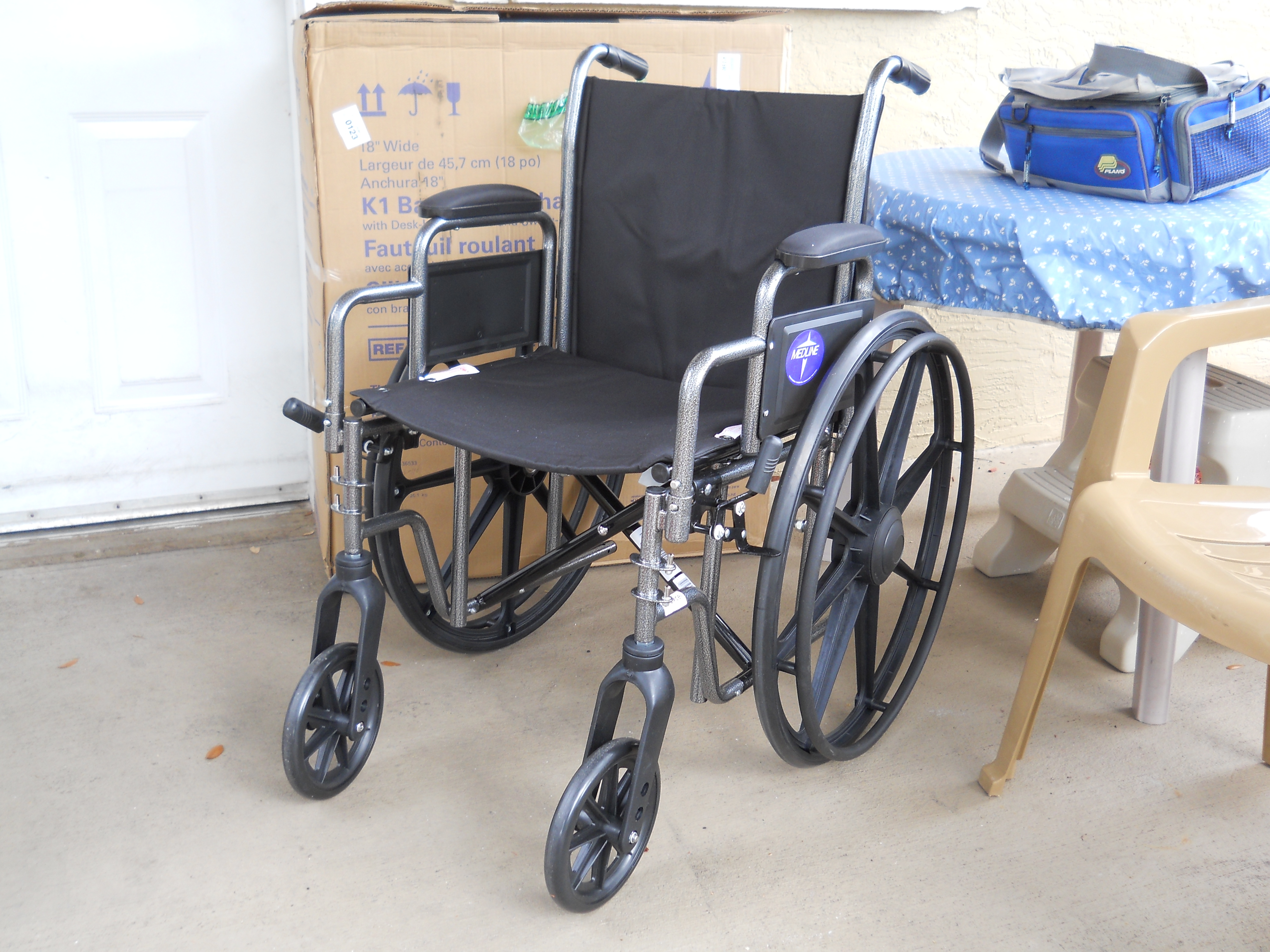
Active wheelchair in the old box design

== Sporting career ==
Küschall began playing table tennis during his rehabilitation at Stoke Mandeville Hospital in the 1960s and participated in the Summer Paralympics for the first time in 1968. From 1982 onwards, he devoted himself to wheelchair racing and broke the world record for almost every distance on several occasions. By the end of his paralympic sporting career in 1992, Küschall had won 21 paralympic medals and was five times world champion.

In 2002, Küschall bought an AC Cobra 427 which he has been driving ever since as the first Swiss quadriplegic with an international motor racing license.
