= Qi Shun =

Chinese Paralympic athlete

Personal information
- Born: 27 November 1984 (age 41)

Sport
- Sport: Paralympic athletics
Medal record
Paralympic athletics
Representing China
Paralympic Games
Gold medal – first place	2008 Beijing	Marathon - T12
World Para Athletics Championships
Silver medal – second place	2002 Lille	4x400m relay T11-13
Asian Para Games
Gold medal – first place	2010 Guangzhou	5000m T12

Qi Shun (born 27 November 1984) is a Paralympian athlete from China competing mainly in category T12 long-distance events.

He competed in the 2004 Summer Paralympics in Athens, Greece. There he went out in the first round of the men's 1500 metres T13 event, went out in the first round of the men's 5000 metres T12 event, finished ninth in the men's 10000 metres T13 event and did not finish in the men's marathon T13 event. He also competed at the 2008 Summer Paralympics in Beijing, China. There he won a gold medal in the men's marathon T12 event.
