= Yuichi Takahashi (athlete) =

Japanese Paralympic athlete

Medal record

Paralympic athletics

Representing Japan

Paralympic Games
Gold medal – first place	2004 Athens	Marathon - T11

Yuichi Takahashi (高橋 勇市, Takahashi Yūichi) is a Paralympian athlete from Japan competing mainly in category T11 long-distance events.

Yuichi took part in the 5000m, 10000m and marathon in the 2004 Summer Paralympics winning the T11 marathon. In the 2008 Summer Paralympics he attempted to defend this title but only managed to finish 16th.
