= List of Paralympic medalists in the 1500 metres =

The 1500 metres races were part of the Summer Paralympics program in 1980. The event was contested by both men and women.

== Men's medal summaries ==
=== Ambulant athletes ===
Class	Year	Gold	Silver	Bronze
C7	1988	Benny Govaerts; Belgium	Rudolf Kocmut; Yugoslavia	Robert Mearns; Canada
C7-8	1992	John Nethercott; Great Britain	Heikki Lehikoinen; Finland	Andrzej Wrobel; Poland
C8	1988	Ari Lehto; Finland	John McGuinness; Ireland	Stephen Syndercombe; Great Britain
L6	1984	Jouko Grip; Finland	Peter Williams; Great Britain	Robert Love; Great Britain
T34-37	1996	Andrzej Wrobel; Poland	Malcolm Pringle; South Africa	Faouzi Bellele; Algeria
T36	2000	Yong Jin Choi; South Korea	Danylo Seredin; Ukraine	Jesus Gonzalez; Spain
T36	2004	Artem Arefyev; Russia	Jose Pampano; Spain	He Chengen; China
T37	2000	Andrzej Wrobel; Poland	Dana Zimmerman; United States	Benny Govaerts; Belgium
T37	2012	Michael McKillop; Ireland	Brad Scott; Australia	Mohamed Charmi; Tunisia
T37	2016	Michael McKillop; Ireland	Liam Stanley; Canada	Madjid Djemai; Algeria
T38	2016	Abbes Saidi; Tunisia	Deon Kenzie; Australia	Louis Radius; France
T38	2020	Nathan Riech; Canada	Abdelkrim Krai; Algeria	Deon Kenzie; Australia
T38	2024	Amen Allah Tissaoui; Tunisia	Nathan Riech; Canada	Reece Langdon; Australia

=== Amputee athletes ===
Class	Year	Gold	Silver	Bronze
A5	1984	Cato Zahl Pedersen; Norway	Slobodan Adzic; Yugoslavia	Axel Hecker; West Germany
A6	1984	Harri Jauhiainen; Finland	Michael O'Callaghan; New Zealand	Giuseppe Pavan; Italy
A6/A8-9/L4	1988	Angel Marin; Spain	Kai Pirttijärvi; Finland	Sameh Ahmed; Egypt
E	1980	R. Lindberg; Finland	Chris Facey; Canada	Jan Krauz; Poland
E1	1980	Cato Zahl Pedersen; Norway	Yekutiel Gershoni; Israel	Jorn Nielsen; Denmark
F	1980	Karl Schroeder; West Germany	J. Alexandre; France	José Santos Poyatos; Spain
F1	1980	Khater Eid Ghreeb; Egypt	Only one competitor	
TS4	1992	Javier Conde; Spain	Sergey Silchenco; Unified Team	Wu Yanjian; China
T44-46	1996	David Evans; Australia	Wu Yanjian; China	Emmanuel Lacroix; France
T46	2000	Robert De Friese Evans; United States	Emmanuel Lacroix; France	Wu Yanjian; China
T46	2008	Abraham Tarbei; Kenya	Abderrahman Ait Khamouch; Spain	Samir Nouioua; Algeria
T46	2012	Abraham Tarbei; Kenya	Wondiye Fikre Indelbu; Ethiopia	Samir Nouioua; Algeria
T46	2016	Samir Nouioua; Algeria	David Emong; Uganda	Michael Roeger; Australia
T46	2020	Aleksandr Iaremchuk; RPC	Hristiyan Stoyanov; Bulgaria	David Emong; Uganda
T46	2024	Aleksandr Iaremchuk; Neutral Paralympic Athletes	Michael Roeger; Australia	Antoine Praud; France

=== Blind athletes ===
Class	Year	Gold	Silver	Bronze
A	1980	Jacques Pilon; Canada	Joerund Gaasemyr; Norway	Hans Anton Aalien; Norway
B	1980	Paul English; Canada	Leamon Stansell; United States	Bruce Sandilands; Australia
B1	1984	Robert Matthews; Great Britain	Tofiri Kibuuka; Norway	Patrick Kelly; Ireland
B1	1988	Robert Matthews; Great Britain	Terje Loevaas; Norway	Tofiri Kibuuka; Norway
B1	1992	Paulo de Almeida Coelho; Portugal	Terje Loevaas; Norway	Robert Matthews; Great Britain
B2	1984	Sixten Berner; Sweden	Sverre Fuglerud; Norway	Gunnar Thomsson; Sweden
B2	1988	Mariano Ruiz; Spain	Noel Thatcher; Great Britain	Michel Pavon; France
B2	1992	Noel Thatcher; Great Britain	Waldemar Kikolski; Poland	Jose Antonio Sanchez; Spain
B3	1984	James Brown; Great Britain	Patrick de Ryck; Belgium	Leamon Stansell; United States
B3	1988	Anthony Hamilton; Great Britain	Farzat Timerboulatov; Soviet Union	Tyrone Branch; United States
B3	1992	Christophe Carayon; France	Said Gomez; Panama	Anthony Hamilton; Great Britain
T10	1996	Paulo de Almeida Coelho; Portugal	Robert Matthews; Great Britain	Henry Willis; United States
T11	1996	Jose Antonio Sanchez; Spain	Cesar Carlavilla; Spain	Saulius Leonavicius; Lithuania
T11	2000	Paulo de Almeida Coelho; Portugal	Jason Dunkerley; Canada	Pedro Delgado; Spain
T11	2004	Mustapha El Aouzari; Morocco	Jason Dunkerley; Canada	Omar Benchiheb; Algeria
T11	2008	Zhang Zhen; China	Samwel Mushai Kimani; Kenya	Jason Dunkerley; Canada
T11	2012	Samwel Mushai Kimani; Kenya	Odair Santos; Brazil	Jason Dunkerley; Canada
T11	2016	Samwel Mushai Kimani; Kenya	Odair Santos; Brazil	Semih Deniz; Turkey
T11	2020	Yeltsin Jacques; Brazil	Shinya Wada; Japan	Fedor Rudakov; RPC
T11	2024	Yeltsin Jacques; Brazil	Yitayal Silesh Yigzaw; Ethiopia	Júlio Cesar Agripino; Brazil
T12	1996	Said Gomez; Panama	Stuart McGregor; Canada	Christophe Carayon; France
T12	2000	Cesar Carlavilla; Spain	Darren Westlake; Great Britain	Oscar Serrano; Spain
T13	2000	Maher Bouallegue; Tunisia	Tim Prendergast; New Zealand	Said Gomez; Panama
T13	2004	Maher Bouallegue; Tunisia	Odair Santos; Brazil	Emanuel Asinikal; Kenya
T13	2008	Henry Kiprono Kirwa; Kenya	Lazaro Raschid Aguilar; Cuba	Ignacio Avila; Spain
T13	2012	Abderrahim Zhiou; Tunisia	David Korir; Kenya	David Devine; Great Britain
T13	2016	Abdellatif Baka; Algeria	Tamiru Demisse; Ethiopia	Henry Kirwa; Kenya
T13	2020	Anton Kuliatin; RPC	Rouay Jebabli; Tunisia	Jaryd Clifford; Australia
T13	2024	Aleksandr Kostin; Neutral Paralympic Athletes	Rouay Jebabli; Tunisia	Anton Kuliatin; Neutral Paralympic Athletes

=== Intellectually impaired athletes ===
Class	Year	Gold	Silver	Bronze
T20	2000	Paul Mitchell; Australia	Ihor Bodnar; Ukraine	Tadeusz Chudzynski; Poland
T20	2012	Peyman Nasiri Bazanjani; Iran	Daniel Pek; Poland	Rafal Korc; Poland
T20	2016	Michael Brannigan; United States	Daniel Pek; Poland	Peyman Nasiri Bazanjani; Iran
T20	2020	Owen Miller; Great Britain	Alexandr Rabotnitskii; RPC	Ndiaga Dieng; Italy
T20	2024	Ben Sandilands; Great Britain	Sandro Baessa; Portugal	Michael Brannigan; United States

=== Wheelchair athletes ===
Class	Year	Gold	Silver	Bronze
1A	1988	Heinrich Koeberle; West Germany	Gunther Obert; West Germany	Bart Dodson; United States
1B	1988	Serge Raymond; Canada	Clayton Gerein; Canada	Peter Schmid; Switzerland
1C	1988	Jeff Worthington; United States	John Brewer; United States	Alan Dufty; Australia
2	1984	Heinz Frei; Switzerland	Paul Clarke; Canada	Mike Nugent; Australia
2	1988	Heinz Frei; Switzerland	Paul Clarke; Canada	Wolfgang Petersen; West Germany
3	1984	Paul van Winkel; Belgium	Gregor Golombek; West Germany	André Viger; Canada
3	1988	Lars Lofstrom; Sweden	Paul van Winkel; Belgium	Gregor Golombek; West Germany
4	1980	B. Parks; United States	Rick Hansen; Canada	Remi van Ophem; Belgium
4	1984	Rick Hansen; Canada	Peter Trotter; Australia	Randy Snow; United States
4	1988	Farid Amarouche; France	Jean-François Poitevin; France	Robert Courtney; United States
5	1980	Mel Fitzgerald; Canada	E. H. Roek; Netherlands	Erich Hubel; Australia
5	1984	Franz Nietlispach; Switzerland	Mel Fitzgerald; Canada	Robert McIntyre; Australia
5–6	1988	Franz Nietlispach; Switzerland	John Anderson; United States	Jeff Adams; Canada
A1-3/A9/L2	1988	Mustapha Badid; France	Daniel Wesley; Canada	Philippe Couprie; France
TW1	1992	Bart Dodson; United States	Rainer Kuschall; Switzerland	Giuseppe Forni; Switzerland
TW2	1992	Theo Duyvestijn; Netherlands	Richard Reelie; Canada	Clayton Gerein; Canada
TW3-4	1992	Michael Noe; United States	Scot Hollonbeck; United States	Marco Re Calegeri; Italy
T50	1996	Fabian Blattman; Australia	Alvise de Vidi; Italy	Tim Johansson; Sweden
T51	1996	Per Vesterlund; Sweden	Dean Bergeron; Canada	Clayton Gerein; Canada
T51	2000	Alvise de Vidi; Italy	Fabian Blattman; Australia	Giuseppe Forni; Switzerland
T52	2000	Greg Smith; Australia	Per Vesterlund; Sweden	Christoph Etzlstorfer; Austria
T52	2016	Raymond Martin; United States	Tomoko Sato; Japan	Pichaya Kurattanasiri; Thailand
T52	2020	Tomoki Sato; Japan	Raymond Martin; United States	Hirokazu Ueyonabaru; Japan
T52-53	1996	Heinz Frei; Switzerland	Scot Hollonbeck; United States	Philippe Couprie; France
T54	2000	Jeff Adams; Canada	Franz Nietlispach; Switzerland	Robert Figl; Germany
T54	2008	David Weir; Great Britain	Prawat Wahoram; Thailand	Kurt Fearnley; Australia
T54	2012	David Weir; Great Britain	Prawat Wahoram; Thailand	Kim Gyu Dae; South Korea
T54	2016	Prawat Wahoram; Thailand	Marcel Hug; Switzerland	Saichon Konjen; Thailand
T54	2020	Marcel Hug; Switzerland	Prawat Wahoram; Thailand	Putharet Khongrak; Thailand
T54	2024	Jin Hua; China	Marcel Hug; Switzerland	Dai Yunqiang; China

== Women's medal summaries ==
=== Amputee athletes ===
Class	Year	Gold	Silver	Bronze
F1	1980	Petra Schad; West Germany	Lina Franzese; Italy	Only two competitors

=== Blind athletes ===
Class	Year	Gold	Silver	Bronze
B1	1984	Margaret Heger; Austria	Cheryl Hurd; Canada	Susanne Wittje; West Germany
B1	1988	Tamara Pankova; Soviet Union	Rossella Inverni; Italy	Refija Okic; Yugoslavia
B1	1992	Pavla Valnicková; Czechoslovakia	Sigita Kriaučiūnienė; Lithuania	Mayte Espinosa; Spain
B2	1984	Christine Nicholas; Canada	Carol Carr; Ireland	Malgorzata Zalenska; Poland
B2	1992	Rima Batalova; Unified Team	Claudia Meier; Germany	Pamela McGonigle; United States
B3	1984	Halina Wozniak; Poland	Norah Good; Canada	Wanda Watts; United States
T10-11	1996	Rima Batalova; Russia	Claudia Meier; Germany	Sigita Markevičienė; Lithuania
T11	2016	Jin Zheng; China	Nancy Chelangat Koech; Kenya	Maritza Arango Buitrago; Colombia
T11	2020	Mónica Olivia Rodríguez; Mexico	Louzanne Coetzee; South Africa	Nancy Chelangat Koech; Kenya
T11	2024	Yayesh Gate Tesfaw; Ethiopia	He Shanshan; China	Louzanne Coetzee; South Africa
T12	2000	Rima Batalova; Russia	Claudia Meier; Germany	Pamela McGonigle; United States
T12	2004	Elena Pautova; Russia	Julia Longorkaye; Kenya	Rima Batalova; Russia
T12	2012	Elena Pautova; Russia	Elena Congost; Spain	Annalisa Minetti; Italy
T13	2008	Somaya Bousaid; Tunisia	Assia El Hannouni; France	Elena Pautova; Russia
T13	2016	Somaya Bousaid; Tunisia	Najah Chouaya; Tunisia	Izaskun Oses Ayucar; Spain
T13	2020	Tigist Mengistu; Ethiopia	Liza Corso; United States	Somaya Bousaid; Tunisia
T13	2024	Tigist Mengistu; Ethiopia	Fatima Ezzahra El Idrissi; Morocco	Liza Corso; United States

=== Intellectually impaired athletes ===
Class	Year	Gold	Silver	Bronze
T20	2012	Barbara Niewiedzial; Poland	Arleta Meloch; Poland	Ilona Biacsi; Hungary
T20	2016	Barbara Niewiedzial; Poland	Ilona Biacsi; Hungary	Liudmyla Danylina; Ukraine
T20	2020	Barbara Bieganowska-Zając; Poland	Liudmyla Danylina; Ukraine	Hannah Taunton; Great Britain
T20	2024	Barbara Bieganowska-Zając; Poland	Liudmyla Danylina; Ukraine	Antônia Keyla; Brazil

=== Wheelchair athletes ===
Class	Year	Gold	Silver	Bronze
1C	1988	Yolande Hansen; West Germany	Leticia Torres; Mexico	Monique Jannette; United States
2	1988	Margit Quell; West Germany	Ann Cody-Morris; United States	Ingrid Lauridsen; Denmark
3	1984	Y. L. Mui; Hong Kong	Gabriele Beyer (Paralympian); West Germany	Y. M. Wong; Hong Kong
3	1988	Candace Cable-Brooks; United States	Sherry Ann Ramsey; United States	Daniela Jutzeler; Switzerland
4	1980	Sharon Rahn; United States	Kathryne Lynne Carlton; United States	C. Zeyher; West Germany
4	1984	Monica Saker; Sweden	Connie Hansen; Denmark	S. Norman; United States
4	1988	Connie Hansen; Denmark	Tracy Miller; United States	Maria Hill; United States
5	1980	Juana Soto; Mexico	Sue Hobbs; Australia	C. Curtiss; United States
5	1984	Angela Leriti; Canada	A. Orvefors; Sweden	Juana Soto; Mexico
A1-3/A9/L2	1988	Jennette Jansen; Netherlands	Sacajuwea Hunter; United States	Linda Hamilton; Canada
TW3-4	1992	Connie Hansen; Denmark	Monica Wetterstrom; Sweden	Jennette Jansen; Netherlands
T52	2000	Lisa Franks; Canada	Teruyo Tanaka; Japan	Anna Tavano; France
T52-53	1996	Louise Sauvage; Australia	Chantal Petitclerc; Canada	Jean Driscoll; United States
T54	2000	Louise Sauvage; Australia	Jean Driscoll; United States	Ariadne Hernandez; Mexico
T54	2004	Chantal Petitclerc; Canada	Edith Hunkeler; Switzerland	Diane Roy; Canada
T54	2008	Chantal Petitclerc; Canada	Shelly Woods; Great Britain	Edith Hunkeler; Switzerland
T54	2012	Tatyana McFadden; United States	Edith Wolf; Switzerland	Shirley Reilly; United States
T54	2016	Tatyana McFadden; United States	Amanda McGrory; United States	Chelsea McClammer; United States
T54	2020	Zhou Zhaoqian; China	Manuela Schar; Switzerland	Madison de Rozario; Australia
T54	2024	Catherine Debrunner; Switzerland	Samantha Kinghorn; Great Britain	Susannah Scaroni; United States

== See also ==
- Athletics at the Olympics
- 1500 metres at the Olympics
