= List of Paralympic medalists in the 800 metres =

The 800 metres race has been on the Summer Paralympic Games program since the 1980 Summer Paralympics.

== Men's medal summaries ==
=== Ambulant athletes ===
Class	Year	Gold	Silver	Bronze
CP C	1980	Bertil Shawn; Sweden	Tony Harborn; Sweden	Mario Panico; Italy
CP D	1980	Jonas Andersson; Sweden	Henrik Thomsen; Denmark	Duvivier; France
C7	1988	Benny Govaerts; Belgium	Sung Kook Kang; South Korea	Robert Mearns; Canada
C7-8	1992	Andrzej Wrobel; Poland	Heikki Lehikoinen; Finland	John Nethercott; Great Britain
C8	1984	Robert Mearns; Canada	Ari Lehto; Finland	Antonio Carlos Martins; Portugal
C8	1988	Robert Biancucci; Australia	Keith Pittman; United States	Javier Salmerón; Spain
T34-36	1996	Joseph Parker; United States	Andrzej Wrobel; Poland	Faouzi Bellele; Algeria
T36	2000	Ivan Hompanera; Spain	Yong Jin Choi; South Korea	Danylo Seredin; Ukraine
T36	2008	Artem Arefyev; Russia	He Chengen; China	Pavel Kharagezov; Russia
T36	2012	Evgenii Shvetcov; Russia	Artem Arefyev; Russia	Paul Blake; Great Britain
T36	2016	James Turner; Australia	Paul Blake; Great Britain	William Stedman; New Zealand
T37	1996	Malcolm Pringle; South Africa	John Nethercott; Great Britain	Manfred Kooy; Netherlands
T37	2004	Oleksandr Driha; Ukraine	Mohamed Charmi; Tunisia	Mariusz Tubielewicz; Poland
T37	2008	Michael McKillop; Ireland	Brad Scott; Australia	Djamel Mastouri; France
T37	2012	Michael McKillop; Ireland	Mohamed Charmi; Tunisia	Brad Scott; Australia
T38	2000	Malcolm Pringle; South Africa	Valeriy Stepanskoy; Russia	Stephen Cooper; Great Britain
T38	2004	Malcolm Pringle; South Africa	Abbes Saidi; Tunisia	Derek Malone; Ireland

=== Amputee athletes ===
Class	Year	Gold	Silver	Bronze
TS4	1992	Javier Conde; Spain	Patrice Gerges; France	Sergey Silchenco; Unified Team
T44	2000	Danny Andrews; United States	Gilberto Alavez; Mexico	Joseph LeMar; United States
T44-46	1996	Oumar Basakoulba Kone; Ivory Coast	David Evans; Australia	Bachir Zergoune; Algeria
T46	2000	Oumar Basakoulba Kone; Ivory Coast	José Monteiro; Portugal	José Fernandez; Spain
T46	2004	Danny Crates; Great Britain	Samir Nouioua; Algeria	Jean de Dieu Nkundabera; Rwanda
T46	2008	Marcin Awizen; Poland	Samir Nouioua; Algeria	Abderrahman Ait Khamouch; Spain
T46	2012	Gunther Matzinger; Austria	Samir Nouioua; Algeria	Abraham Tarbei; Kenya

=== Blind athletes ===
Class	Year	Gold	Silver	Bronze
B1	1984	Robert Matthews; Great Britain	Tofiri Kibuuka; Norway	Patrick Kelly; Ireland
B1	1988	Robert Matthews; Great Britain	Claudio Costa; Italy	Keith Myette; Canada
B1	1992	Oscar Pupo; Cuba	Robert Matthews; Great Britain	Paulo de Almeida Coelho; Portugal
B2	1984	Freddy Matton; Belgium	Ramon Odzakovic; Yugoslavia	Sixten Berner; Sweden
B2	1988	Noel Thatcher; Great Britain	Anatoly Pomykalova; Soviet Union	Michel Pavon; France
B2	1992	Waldemar Kikolski; Poland	Jose Antonio Sanchez; Spain	Noel Thatcher; Great Britain
B3	1984	James Brown; Great Britain	Leamon Stansell; United States	Fintan O'Donnell; Ireland
B3	1988	Anthony Hamilton; Great Britain	Farzat Timerboulatov; Soviet Union	Tyrone Branch; United States
B3	1992	Christophe Carayon; France	Said Gomez; Panama	Sam Rickard; Australia
T10	1996	Domingos Ramiao Game; Portugal	Paulo de Almeida Coelho; Portugal	Pedro Delgado; Spain
T11	1996	Jose Antonio Sanchez; Spain	Jose Saura; Spain	Ruben Delgado; Spain
T12	2000	Cesar Carlavilla; Spain	Abel Avila; Spain	Paul Fernand Kra Koffi; Ivory Coast
T12	2004	Abel Avila; Spain	Maher Bouallegue; Tunisia	Odair Santos; Brazil
T12	2008	Abderrahim Zhiou; Tunisia	Lazaro Raschid Aguilar; Cuba	Odair Santos; Brazil
T12	2012	Abderrahim Zhiou; Tunisia	Egor Sharov; Russia	David Devine; Great Britain
T13	2000	Maher Bouallegue; Tunisia	Tim Prendergast; New Zealand	Stuart McGregor; Canada
T13	2004	Tim Prendergast; New Zealand	Gilson Anjos; Brazil	Stuart McGregor; Canada
T13	2008	Abdelillah Mame; Morocco	Peter Gottwald Jr. United States	Zine Eddine Sekhri; Algeria
T13	2012	Abdellatif Baka; Algeria	David Korir; Kenya	Abdelillah Mame; Morocco

=== Wheelchair athletes ===
Class	Year	Gold	Silver	Bronze
1A	1984	Heinrich Koeberle; West Germany	J. Lewellyn; United States	Rainer Küschall; Switzerland
1A	1988	Gunther Obert; West Germany	Hans Lubbering; West Germany	Heinrich Koeberle; West Germany
1B	1984	J. Matsson; Sweden	Peter Schmid; Switzerland	N. Jorgensen; United States
1B	1988	Clayton Gerein; Canada	Peter Schmid; Switzerland	Jan-Owe Mattson; Sweden
1C	1984	D. Goodman; United States	Eduardo Monsalvo; Mexico	Alan Dufty; Australia
1C	1988	Jeff Worthington; United States	John Brewer; United States	André Beaudoin; Canada
2	1984	Paul Clark; Canada	Heinz Frei; Switzerland	Mike Nugent; Australia
2	1988	Paul Clark; Canada	Heinz Frei; Switzerland	Wolfgang Petersen; West Germany
3	1984	Marc de Vos; Belgium	Gregor Golombek; West Germany	J. Rodolf; United States
3	1988	Paul van Winkel; Belgium	Lars Lofstrom; Sweden	André Viger; Canada
4	1980	Rick Hansen; Canada	B. Parks; United States	Uriel Martinez; Mexico
4	1984	Ron Minor; Canada	Randy Snow; United States	Peter Trotter; Australia
4	1988	Rafael Ibarra; United States	Farid Amarouche; France	Saúl Mendoza; Mexico
5	1980	Mel Fitzgerald; Canada	Erich Hubel; Australia	E. H. Roek; Netherlands
5	1984	Franz Nietlispach; Switzerland	Robert McIntyre; Australia	Mel Fitzgerald; Canada
5-6	1988	Franz Nietlispach; Switzerland	John Anderson; United States	Jeff Adams; Canada
A1-3	1984	Mustapha Badid; France	Jim Martinson; United States	Gerry O'Rourke; Ireland
A1-3/A9/L2	1988	Daniel Wesley; Canada	Hakan Ericsson; Sweden	Kevin Orr; United States; Philippe Couprie; France
A6/A8-9/L4	1988	Angel Marin; Spain	Harri Jauhiainen; Finland	Jean-Yves Arvier; France
C2	1988	David Osborn; United States	Mogens Justesen; Denmark	Ken Thomas; Canada
C4	1984	Robert Easton; Canada	Jean Louis Janneay; France	Gino Vendetti; Canada
L3	1984	Hikan Eriksson; Sweden	Bill Lehr; United States	John Grant; Great Britain
TW1	1992	Bart Dodson; United States	Rainer Küschall; Switzerland	Alvise de Vidi; Italy
TW2	1992	Richard Reelie; Canada	Johann Kastner; Germany	Clayton Gerein; Canada
TW3	1992	Heinz Frei; Switzerland	Jean-Marc Berset; Switzerland	Luke Gingras; Canada
TW4	1992	Scot Hollonbeck; United States	Jeff Adams; Canada	Cisco Jeter; United States
T34	2016	Mohamed Hammadi; United Arab Emirates	Walid Ktila; Tunisia	Rheed McCracken; Australia
T34	2020	Walid Ktila; Tunisia	Mohamed Hammadi; United Arab Emirates	Wang Yang; China
T50	1996	Alvise de Vidi; Italy	Fabian Blattman; Australia	Bart Dodson; United States
T51	1996	Shawn Meredith; United States	Dean Bergeron; Canada	Per Vesterlund; Sweden
T51	2000	Alvise De Vidi; Italy	Tim Johansson; Sweden	Fabian Blattman; Australia
T52	1996	Steve Orens; Belgium	Heinz Frei; Switzerland	Marc Quessy; Canada
T52	2000	Greg Smith; Australia	Richard Reelie; Canada	Santiago Sanz; Spain
T52	2004	Abdellah Ez Zine; Morocco	Thomas Geierspichler; Austria	Dean Bergeron; Canada
T52	2008	Tomoya Ito; Japan	Toshihiro Takada; Japan	Thomas Geierspichler; Austria
T52	2012	Raymond Martin; United States	Tomoya Ito; Japan	Leonardo De Jesus Perez Juarez; Mexico
T53	1996	Jeff Adams; Canada	Scot Hollonbeck; United States	Mustapha Badid; France
T53	2000	Heinz Frei; Switzerland	Jun Hiromichi; Japan	Pierre Fairbank; France
T53	2004	Richard Colman; Australia	Adam Bleakney; United States	Jun Hiromichi; Japan
T53	2008	Li Huzhao; China	Joshua George; United States	Hong Suk-Man; South Korea
T53	2012	Richard Colman; Australia	Brent Lakatos; Canada	Joshua George; United States
T53	2016	Pongsakorn Paeyo; Thailand	Pierre Fairbank; France	Brent Lakatos; Canada
T53	2020	Pongsakorn Paeyo; Thailand	Brent Lakatos; Canada	Pierre Fairbank; France
T54	2000	Jeff Adams; Canada	Kurt Fearnley; Australia	Saúl Mendoza; Mexico
T54	2004	Choke Yasuoka; Japan	Ernst van Dyk; South Africa	Marcel Hug; Switzerland
T54	2008	David Weir; Great Britain	Kurt Fearnley; Australia	Prawat Wahoram; Thailand
T54	2012	David Weir; Great Britain	Marcel Hug; Switzerland	Saichon Konjen; Thailand
T54	2016	Marcel Hug; Switzerland	Saichon Konjen; Thailand	Kim Gyu-dae; South Korea
T54	2020	Marcel Hug; Switzerland	Dai Yunqiang; China	Saichon Konjen; Thailand

== Women's medal summaries ==
=== Ambulant athletes ===
Class	Year	Gold	Silver	Bronze
C7	1988	Susan Moucha; United States	Norma Lorincz; Canada	Racquel Head; Canada
C8	1988	Maki Okada; Japan	Barbara Buchan; United States	Annette Saeger; West Germany

=== Amputee athletes ===
Class	Year	Gold	Silver	Bronze
A6	1984	Julia Scarlett; Great Britain	Christelle Donnez; France	Only two competitors

=== Blind athletes ===
Class	Year	Gold	Silver	Bronze
A	1980	Susanna Wittje; West Germany	Doris Campell; Austria	K. Pennanen; Finland
B	1980	I. Schafhausen; West Germany	Brenda Wells; United States	Lily Wong; Canada
B1	1984	Lori Bennett; United States	Rossella Inverni; Italy	Gabriele Rossmeier; West Germany
B1	1988	Tamara Pankova; Soviet Union	Rossella Inverni; Italy	Refija Okic; Yugoslavia
B1	1992	Purificacion Santamarta; Spain	Sigita Kriaučiūnienė; Lithuania	Pavla Valnicková; Czechoslovakia
B2	1984	Malgorzata Zalenska; Poland	Emanuela Grigio; Italy	Anelise Hermany; Brazil
B2	1988	Rima Batalova; Soviet Union	Anelise Hermany; Brazil	Paige McClean; United States
B2	1992	Rima Batalova; Unified Team	Claudia Meier; Germany	Pamela McGonigle; United States
B3	1984	Wanda Watts; United States	Halina Wozniak; Poland	Agnese Grigio; Italy
B3	1988	Patti Egensteiner; United States	Danute Chmidek; Soviet Union	Stephanie Lacour; United States
T10-11	1996	Rima Batalova; Russia	Claudia Meier; Germany	Sigita Markevičienė; Lithuania
T12	2000	Rima Batalova; Russia	Tracey Hinton; Great Britain	Victoria Chernova; Russia
T12	2004	Assia El Hannouni; France	Rima Batalova; Russia	Elena Pautova; Russia
T12-13	2008	Somaya Bousaid; Tunisia	Assia El Hannouni; France	Elena Pautova; Russia

=== Intellectually impaired athletes ===
Class	Year	Gold	Silver	Bronze
T20	2000	Barbara Bieganowska; Poland	Arleta Meloch; Poland	Trish Flavel; Australia

=== Wheelchair athletes ===
Class	Year	Gold	Silver	Bronze
1A	1984	Martha Gustafson; Canada	M. Ferraz; Brazil	K. Holm; United States
1C	1984	Tham Simpson; Canada	J. Mora; United States	Gregoria Gutiérrez; Mexico
1C	1988	Leticia Torres; Mexico	Florence Gossiaux; France	Yolande Hansen; West Germany
2	1984	Ingrid Lauridsen; Denmark	Jayne Schiff; United States	B. Moore; United States
2	1988	Ingrid Lauridsen; Denmark	Ann Cody-Morris; United States	Brenda Zajac; United States
3	1984	Gabriele Beyer (Paralympian); West Germany	Bernadette Melliger; Switzerland	Y. M. Wong; Hong Kong
3	1988	Candace Cable-Brooks; United States	Sherry Ann Ramsey; United States	Daniela Jutzeler; Switzerland
4	1980	Sharon Rahn; United States	Kathryne Lynne Carlton; United States	Ana Maria Tenorio; Mexico
4	1984	Monica Saker; Sweden	D. Rakieki; Canada	S. Norman; United States
4	1988	Connie Hansen; Denmark	Tracy Miller; United States	Kay McShane; Ireland
5	1980	Juana Soto; Mexico	Sue Hobbs; Australia	C. Curtiss; United States
5	1984	Angela Leriti; Canada	A. Orvefors; Sweden	Ana Beatriz Cisneros; Mexico
A1-3/A9/L2	1988	Jennette Jansen; Netherlands	Linda Hamilton; Canada	Valerie Deconde; France
C4	1984	Merja Jaaroa; Sweden	Kimala Searcy; United States	Cathy Brown; United States
TW2	1992	Kristine Harder; Canada	Leticia Torres; Mexico	Florence Gossiaux; France
TW3	1992	Tanni Grey; Great Britain	Ingrid Lauridsen; Denmark	Colette Bourgonje; Canada
TW4	1992	Connie Hansen; Denmark	Louise Sauvage; Australia	Chantal Petitclerc; Canada
T34	2016	Hannah Cockroft; Great Britain	Alexa Halko; United States	Kare Adenegan; Great Britain
T34	2020	Hannah Cockroft; Great Britain	Kare Adenegan; Great Britain	Alexa Halko; United States
T51	1996	Teruyo Tanaka; Japan	Cristeen Smith; New Zealand	Ursina Greuter; Switzerland
T52	1996	Tanni Grey; Great Britain	Leann Shannon; United States	Ann Walters; United States
T52	2000	Lisa Franks; Canada	Teruyo Tanaka; Japan	Ursina Greuter; Switzerland
T53	1996	Louise Sauvage; Australia	Chantal Petitclerc; Canada	Cheri Becerra; United States
T53	2000	Tanni Grey-Thompson; Great Britain	Jessica Galli; United States	Cheri Blauwet; United States
T53	2004	Cheri Blauwet; United States	Francesca Porcellato; Italy	Madeleine Nordlund; Sweden
T53	2008	Zhou Hongzhuan; China	Jessica Galli; United States	Amanda McGrory; United States
T53	2012	Zhou Hongzhuan; China	Huang Lisha; China	Jessica Galli; United States
T53	2016	Zhou Hongzhuan; China	Madison de Rozario; Australia	Shirley Reilly; United States
T53	2020	Madison de Rozario; Australia	Zhou Hongzhuan; China	Catherine Debrunner; Switzerland
T54	2000	Chantal Petitclerc; Canada	Louise Sauvage; Australia	Ariadne Hernandez; Mexico
T54	2004	Chantal Petitclerc; Canada	Louise Sauvage; Australia	Jessica Matassa; Canada
T54	2008	Chantal Petitclerc; Canada	Tatyana McFadden; United States	Diane Roy; Canada
T54	2012	Tatyana McFadden; United States	Edith Wolf; Switzerland	Zou Lihong; China
T54	2016	Tatyana McFadden; United States	Liu Wenjun; China	Li Yingjie; China
T54	2020	Manuela Schar; Switzerland	Tatyana McFadden; United States	Susannah Scaroni; United States

== See also ==
- Athletics at the Olympics
- 800 metres at the Olympics
