= Athletics at the 2004 Summer Paralympics – Men's 800 metres T12–13 =

Men's 100m races for blind & visually impaired athletes at the 2004 Summer Paralympics were held in the Athens Olympic Stadium from 25 to 27 September. Events were held in two disability classes.

== T12 ==
Men's 800m T12 at the XII Paralympic Games
- Venue: Athens Olympic Stadium
- Dates: 25–27 September 2004
- Competitors: 10 from 7 nations
- Winning time: 1:53.12

Medalists
1st place, gold medalist(s)		Ignacio Avila	Spain
2nd place, silver medalist(s)		Maher Bouallegue	Tunisia
3rd place, bronze medalist(s)		Odair Santos	Brazil

The T12 event consisted of 2 heats and a final. It was won by Ignacio Avila, representing Spain.

=== 1st Round ===
Qualified for next round

Heat 1

25 Sept. 2004, 09:30

Rank	Athlete	Time	Notes
1	Odair Santos (BRA)	1:59.30	Q
2	Abel Avila (ESP)	1:59.52	q
3	Mustapha El Aouzari (MAR)	2:01.84	
4	Sergey Budanov (RUS)	2:02.55	
5	Duncan Kipkemei (KEN)	2:03.51	

Heat 2

25 Sept. 2004, 09:38

Rank	Athlete	Time	Notes
1	Andrew A. Auma (KEN)	1:57.31	Q
2	Maher Bouallegue (TUN)	1:57.81	q
3	Ignacio Avila (ESP)	1:58.55	q
4	Jason Dunkerley (CAN)	2:03.54	
	Abdeljalil El Atifi (MAR)	DNS	

=== Final Round ===
27 Sept. 2004, 18:45

Rank	Athlete	Time	Notes
1st place, gold medalist(s)	Ignacio Avila (ESP)	1:53.12	WR
2nd place, silver medalist(s)	Maher Bouallegue (TUN)	1:54.04	
3rd place, bronze medalist(s)	Odair Santos (BRA)	1:54.08	
4	Andrew A. Auma (KEN)	1:55.75	
5	Abel Avila (ESP)	1:59.00	

== T13 ==
Men's 800m T13 at the XII Paralympic Games
- Venue: Athens Olympic Stadium
- Dates: 27 September 2004
- Competitors: 8 from 8 nations
- Winning time: 1:56.23

Medalists
1st place, gold medalist(s)		Tim Prendergast	New Zealand
2nd place, silver medalist(s)		Gilson Anjos	Brazil
3rd place, bronze medalist(s)		Stuart McGregor	Canada

The T13 event consisted of a single race. It was won by Tim Prendergast, representing New Zealand.

=== Final Round ===
27 Sept. 2004, 18:35

Rank	Athlete	Time	Notes
1st place, gold medalist(s)	Tim Prendergast (NZL)	1:56.23	
2nd place, silver medalist(s)	Gilson Anjos (BRA)	1:56.81	
3rd place, bronze medalist(s)	Stuart McGregor (CAN)	1:56.93	
4	Yunieski Abreu (CUB)	1:57.98	
5	Peter Gottwald Jr. (USA)	2:00.02	
6	Andrius Kalvelis (LTU)	2:03.47	
7	Max Bergmann (GER)	2:04.98	
8	Paolo Barbera (ITA)	2:05.47	
