= Athletics at the 2004 Summer Paralympics – Men's 1500 metres T11–13 =

Men's 1500m races for blind & visually impaired athletes at the 2004 Summer Paralympics were held in the Athens Olympic Stadium from 19 to 22 September. Events were held in two disability classes.

== T11 ==
Men's 1,500m T11 at the XII Paralympic Games
- Venue: Athens Olympic Stadium
- Dates: 22 September 2004
- Competitors: 8 from 6 nations
- Winning time: 4:08.58

Medalists
1st place, gold medalist(s)		Mustapha El Aouzari	Morocco
2nd place, silver medalist(s)		Jason Dunkerley	Canada
3rd place, bronze medalist(s)		Omar Benchiheb	Algeria

The T11 event consisted of a single race. It was won by Mustapha El Aouzari, representing Morocco.

=== Final Round ===
22 Sept. 2004, 18:25

Rank	Athlete	Time	Notes
1st place, gold medalist(s)	Mustapha El Aouzari (MAR)	4:08.58	
2nd place, silver medalist(s)	Jason Dunkerley (CAN)	4:14.19	
3rd place, bronze medalist(s)	Omar Benchiheb (ALG)	4:14.62	
4	Pedro Delgado (ESP)	4:15.57	
5	Nuno Alves (POR)	4:17.59	
6	Frangs T. Karanja (KEN)	4:25.89	
7	Paulo de Almeida Coelho (POR)	4:26.60	
	Ricardo Vale (POR)	DNF	

== T13 ==
Men's 1,500m T13 at the XII Paralympic Games
- Venue: Athens Olympic Stadium
- Dates: 19–21 September 2004
- Competitors: 20 from 15 nations
- Winning time: 3:51.09

Medalists
1st place, gold medalist(s)		Maher Bouallegue	Tunisia
2nd place, silver medalist(s)		Odair Santos	Brazil
3rd place, bronze medalist(s)		Emanuel Asinikal	Kenya

The T13 event consisted of 2 heats and a final. It was won by Maher Bouallegue, representing Tunisia.

=== 1st Round ===
Qualified for next round

Heat 1

19 Sept. 2004, 20:50

Rank	Athlete	Time	Notes
1	Maher Bouallegue (TUN)	4:02.19	Q
2	Tim Prendergast (NZL)	4:03.65	Q
3	Darren Westlake (GBR)	4:03.67	Q
4	Abel Avila (ESP)	4:03.74	Q
5	Gilson Anjos (BRA)	4:04.01	q
6	Emanuel Asinikal (KEN)	4:04.19	q
7	Yunieski Abreu (CUB)	4:07.41	
8	Andrius Kalvelis (LTU)	4:16.24	
9	Sergey Budanov (RUS)	4:16.93	
10	Duncan Kipkemei (KEN)	4:18.05	

Heat 2

19 Sept. 2004, 20:59

Rank	Athlete	Time	Notes
1	Odair Santos (BRA)	4:03.18	Q
2	Ignacio Avila (ESP)	4:03.59	Q
3	Max Bergmann (GER)	4:03.84	Q
4	Abdeljalil El Atifi (MAR)	4:04.31	Q
5	Peter Gottwald Jr. (USA)	4:05.05	q
6	Luis Enrique Herrera (MEX)	4:05.53	q
7	Andrew A. Auma (KEN)	4:13.97	
8	Qi Shun (CHN)	4:14.04	
9	Paolo Barbera (ITA)	4:16.21	
10	Diosmani Gonzalez (CUB)	4:19.95	

=== Final Round ===
21 Sept. 2004, 18:20

Rank	Athlete	Time	Notes
1st place, gold medalist(s)	Maher Bouallegue (TUN)	3:51.09	WR
2nd place, silver medalist(s)	Odair Santos (BRA)	3:54.06	
3rd place, bronze medalist(s)	Emanuel Asinikal (KEN)	3:54.74	
4	Tim Prendergast (NZL)	3:56.03	
5	Abel Avila (ESP)	3:57.44	
6	Ignacio Avila (ESP)	4:04.71	
7	Luis Enrique Herrera (MEX)	4:04.79	
8	Peter Gottwald Jr. (USA)	4:08.39	
9	Gilson Anjos (BRA)	4:08.41	
10	Abdeljalil El Atifi (MAR)	4:08.91	
11	Darren Westlake (GBR)	4:10.64	
12	Max Bergmann (GER)	4:13.80	
