= Athletics at the 2004 Summer Paralympics – Men's 5000 metres T11–13 =

Men's 5000m races for blind & visually impaired athletes at the 2004 Summer Paralympics were held in the Athens Olympic Stadium on 23 & 24 September. Events were held in three disability classes, each class running a single race.

== T11 ==
Men's 5,000m T11 at the XII Paralympic Games
- Venue: Athens Olympic Stadium
- Dates: 24 September 2004
- Competitors: 11 from 8 nations
- Winning time: 15:11.07

Medalists
1st place, gold medalist(s)		Henry Wanyoike	Kenya
2nd place, silver medalist(s)		Mustapha El Aouzari	Morocco
3rd place, bronze medalist(s)		Frangs T. Karanja	Kenya

The T11 event was won by Henry Wanyoike, representing Kenya.

=== Final Round ===
24 Sept. 2004, 20:20

Rank	Athlete	Time	Notes
1st place, gold medalist(s)	Henry Wanyoike (KEN)	15:11.07	WR
2nd place, silver medalist(s)	Mustapha El Aouzari (MAR)	15:33.42	
3rd place, bronze medalist(s)	Frangs T. Karanja (KEN)	16:05.38	
4	Omar Benchiheb (ALG)	16:19.17	
5	Nuno Alves (POR)	16:19.68	
6	Robert Matthews MBE (GBR)	16:20.51	
7	Paulo de Almeida Coelho (POR)	16:38.45	
8	Ricardo Vale (POR)	16:42.72	
9	Nicolas Ledesma (MEX)	16:44.37	
	Zhang Zhen (CHN)	DNF	
	Yuichi Takahashi (JPN)	DNF	

== T12 ==
Men's 5,000m T12 at the XII Paralympic Games
- Venue: Athens Olympic Stadium
- Dates: 24 September 2004
- Competitors: 12 from 11 nations
- Winning time: 14:54.08

Medalists
1st place, gold medalist(s)		Maher Bouallegue	Tunisia
2nd place, silver medalist(s)		Odair Santos	Brazil
3rd place, bronze medalist(s)		Emanuel Asinikal	Kenya

The T12 event was won by Maher Bouallegue, representing Tunisia.

=== Final Round ===
24 Sept. 2004, 21:05

Rank	Athlete	Time	Notes
1st place, gold medalist(s)	Maher Bouallegue (TUN)	14:54.08	PR
2nd place, silver medalist(s)	Odair Santos (BRA)	15:00.80	
3rd place, bronze medalist(s)	Emanuel Asinikal (KEN)	15:09.67	
4	Noel Thatcher MBE (GBR)	15:16.59	
5	Abel Avila (ESP)	15:16.70	
6	Diosmani Gonzalez (CUB)	15:22.54	
7	Moisés Beristáin (MEX)	15:41.72	
8	Luis Enrique Herrera (MEX)	15:47.69	
9	Vedran Lozanov (CRO)	16:01.38	
10	Qi Shun (CHN)	16:13.85	
11	Daniel Vasquez (CHI)	18:01.58	
	Abdeljalil El Atifi (MAR)	DNF	

== T13 ==
Men's 5,000m T13 at the XII Paralympic Games
- Venue: Athens Olympic Stadium
- Dates: 23 September 2004
- Competitors: 12 from 9 nations
- Winning time: 15:21.25

Medalists
1st place, gold medalist(s)		Joseph L. Ngorialuk	Kenya
2nd place, silver medalist(s)		Said Gomez	Panama
3rd place, bronze medalist(s)		Yunieski Abreu	Cuba

The T13 event was won by Joseph L. Ngorialuk, representing Kenya.

=== Final Round ===
23 Sept. 2004, 20:10

Rank	Athlete	Time	Notes
1st place, gold medalist(s)	Joseph L. Ngorialuk (KEN)	15:21.25	
2nd place, silver medalist(s)	Said Gomez (PAN)	15:23.90	
3rd place, bronze medalist(s)	Yunieski Abreu (CUB)	15:30.59	
4	Kestutis Bartkenas (LTU)	15:47.46	
5	Max Bergmann (GER)	16:04.99	
6	Daniel Ramirez (MEX)	16:13.19	
7	German Nava (MEX)	16:31.64	
8	Cesar A. Lopez (GUA)	17:41.09	
	Nicolai Ciumac (MDA)	DNF	
	Zeinolla Seitov (KAZ)	DNS	
	Linas Balsys (LTU)	DNS	
	Igor Lisnic (MDA)	DNS	
