= Athletics at the Summer Paralympics =

- Governing body: IPC
- Events: 160 (men: 100; women: 60)

Games
- 1960; 1964; 1968; 1972; 1976; 1980; 1984; 1988; 1992; 1996; 2000; 2004; 2008; 2012; 2016; 2020; 2024
- Medalists; Records

Athletics has been contested at every Summer Paralympics since the first games in 1960. Men and women from all disability groups compete in the sport.

Some athletes use wheelchairs or prosthetic limbs and compete in their respective sport independently and under their own power.

Visually impaired athletes participate in running events with the help of a sighted guide, to whom they may be attached by a tether. Sound-emitting devices or a sighted "caller" are used to indicate target areas for throwing events, take-off points for jumping events, and other important locations for visually impaired competitors.

There are several different classifications and groups in which athletes compete that are based on their disability. Each disability has a different classification which determines the class the athletes will compete in. Nearly every opportunity that is available to non-disabled athletes is available in the Paralympics.

In the first edition of the Summer Paralympic Games in 1960, Italy finished the sport in the first place of the medal table, between 1964 and 1996 there was a clear dominance of the United States, being broken in 2000, when Australia dominated the sport at home and since 2004, China has dominated the sport.

== Summary ==
Games	Year	Events	Best Nation
1	1960	25	Italy
2	1964	42	United States
3	1968	70	United States
4	1972	73	United States
5	1976	208	United States
6	1980	274	United States
7	1984	443	United States
8	1988	333	United States
9	1992	240	United States
10	1996	211	United States
11	2000	234	Australia
12	2004	194	China
13	2008	160	China
14	2012	170	China
15	2016	177	China
16	2020	168	China
17	2024	164	China

== Classification ==
Athletes compete in various classes which group them according to their impairments and abilities.

Class	Criteria
T/F11	From no light perception at all in either eye, up to and including the ability to perceive light; inability to recognize objects or contours in any direction and at any distance.
T/F12	Ability to recognise objects up to a distance of 2 metres i.e. below 2/60 and/or visual field of less than five (5) degrees
T/F13	Can recognise contours between 2 and 6 metres away i.e. 2/60 O 6/60 and visual field of more than five (5) degrees and less than twenty (20) degrees.
T/F20	Athletes who have a recognised intellectual impairment according to international standards as recognised by the World Health Organisation i.e. IQ testing of 75 and below.
T/F33	Moderate quadriplegia. Fair functional strength and moderate problems in upper extremities and torso. Wheelchair for daily activities but may be ambulant with assistive devices.
T/F34	Moderate to severe problems in lower limbs, good functional strength and minimal control problems in upper limbs and torso. Wheelchair for daily activities but may be ambulant with assistive devices
T/F35	Good functional strength and minimal control problems in upper limbs. No wheelchair. May or may not use assistive devices.
T/F36	Greater upper limb involvement, less coordination / balance problems when running or throwing. Ambulates without walking devices.
T/F37	Moderate to minimal hemiplegia (i.e. one half of the body affected – arm and leg on same side). Good functional ability in non affected side. Walks / runs without assistive devices, but with a limp.
T/F38	Minimal hemiplegia. May have minimal coordination problems, good balance. Runs and jumps freely
T40	Les Autres- French for "The Others"- disabilities that do not fall into any specific categories, for example Dwarfism. Height limit, Males 145 cm, Females 140 cm.
T42	Single leg, above or through knee amputation. Combined lower plus upper limb amputations. Minimal disability.
T43	Double leg, below knee amputation. Combined lower plus upper limb amputations. Normal function in throwing arm.
T44	Single leg below knee amputation. Combined lower plus upper limb amputations. Ambulant with moderately reduced function in one or both lower limbs
T45	Double arm amputation.
T46	Single arm amputation. Normal function in both lower limbs. Other impairments in trunk. Upper limb function in throwing.
T52	Damage to spinal cord in the higher parts of the back. Substantially impaired or no trunk function; no leg function. Pushing power comes from elbow extensions.
T53	Impaired trunk movements, some with no spinal control. Some interference in their ability to perform long and forceful strokes and the ability to rapidly grasp and release the pushing rim of the wheel.
T54	Have normal or nearly normal upper limb function. May have no upper trunk movements and when pushing, the trunk is usually lying on the legs. Those with almost normal trunk function are able to perform long and forceful strokes. Double above the knee amputations.
F52	Limited arm function. Difficulty gripping with non-throwing arm. Shot – Unable to form a fist and therefore do not usually have finger contact with the shot at the release point. Discus – Have difficulty placing fingers over the edge of the discus. Javelin – Usually grip the Javelin between the index and middle fingers, or between the middle and ring fingers.
F53	Have nearly normal grip with non-throwing arm. Shot – Usually a good fist can be made. Can spread fingers apart and can 'grasp' the shot put when throwing. Discus – Have good finger function to hold the discus and may be able to impart spin on the discus. Are able to spread and close the fingers, but not with normal power. Javelin – Usually grip javelin between the thumb and the index finger. Have ability to hold javelin.
F54	Normal arm function; no trunk or leg function. Shot, Discus and Javelin – Have no sitting balance and usually hold on to part of chair whilst throwing
F55	Some trunk function; no leg function. Fair to good sitting balance.
F56	Trunk function with some upper leg function. Good balance and movements backwards and forwards.
F57	Usually one 'good' leg and one 'bad' leg. Good movements backwards and forwards, usually to one side. Can raise from a sitting to a standing position with assistance during the throw.
F58	Seated. Better function than F57 athletes, but not enough to stand to throw. Usually similar impairment in both legs.

== Medal summary ==
=== Medal table ===
The following medal table is the winnings of the 2020 Paralympic Games. Countries in italics are former countries who participated in the Paralympic Games. The United States has more than doubled the winnings of any other country, Great Britain and Canada being their closest competitor.

Rank	Nation	Gold	Silver	Bronze	Total
1	United States (USA)	390	383	335	1,108
2	Great Britain (GBR)	205	163	186	554
3	Canada (CAN)	199	165	164	528
4	China (CHN)	187	149	100	436
5	Australia (AUS)	155	162	165	482
6	West Germany (FRG)	140	125	121	386
7	Poland (POL)	117	107	90	314
8	Spain (ESP)	82	69	61	212
9	France (FRA)	74	86	77	237
10	Germany (GER)	70	96	106	272
11	South Africa (RSA)	70	55	54	179
12	Switzerland (SUI)	67	68	61	196
13	Mexico (MEX)	64	64	68	196
14	Japan (JPN)	60	66	54	180
15	Sweden (SWE)	55	48	34	137
16	Italy (ITA)	53	58	67	178
17	Belgium (BEL)	53	46	34	133
18	Brazil (BRA)	51	73	54	178
19	Finland (FIN)	46	64	53	163
20	Austria (AUT)	43	62	65	170
21	Russia (RUS)	43	30	21	94
22	Tunisia (TUN)	42	39	23	104
23	New Zealand (NZL)	40	32	29	101
24	Ukraine (UKR)	38	55	44	137
25	Ireland (IRL)	38	39	63	140
26	Netherlands (NED)	36	48	45	129
27	Iran (IRI)	36	30	28	94
28	Denmark (DEN)	36	24	17	77
29	Israel (ISR)	35	37	39	111
30	Cuba (CUB)	34	16	17	67
31	Norway (NOR)	27	29	26	82
32	Egypt (EGY)	25	27	35	87
33	Algeria (ALG)	23	22	30	75
34	South Korea (KOR)	21	16	17	54
35	Soviet Union (URS)	21	9	6	36
36	Kenya (KEN)	18	14	14	46
37	Portugal (POR)	17	14	21	52
38	Thailand (THA)	16	16	14	46
39	Morocco (MAR)	16	11	9	36
40	Argentina (ARG)	15	33	31	79
41	Czech Republic (CZE)	15	19	18	52
42	Jamaica (JAM)	14	8	13	35
43	Nigeria (NGR)	14	3	4	21
44	RPC (RPC)	12	13	13	38
45	Kuwait (KUW)	11	16	16	43
46	Unified Team (EUN)	11	10	7	28
47	Belarus (BLR)	10	17	20	47
48	Yugoslavia (YUG)	10	11	16	37
49	Colombia (COL)	8	7	21	36
50	Hong Kong (HKG)	8	7	17	32
51	Uzbekistan (UZB)	8	3	5	16
52	Azerbaijan (AZE)	7	7	8	22
53	Greece (GRE)	6	17	24	47
54	India (IND)	5	14	7	26
55	Lithuania (LTU)	5	9	12	26
56	Bulgaria (BUL)	5	8	3	16
57	Latvia (LAT)	5	5	8	18
58	Croatia (CRO)	4	6	14	24
59	Rhodesia (RHO)	4	5	5	14
60	Angola (ANG)	4	3	1	8
60	Serbia (SRB)	4	3	1	8
62	Czechoslovakia (TCH)	4	2	6	12
63	Malaysia (MAS)	4	0	3	7
64	Hungary (HUN)	3	10	6	19
65	Venezuela (VEN)	3	7	9	19
66	Panama (PAN)	3	4	1	8
67	Ivory Coast (CIV)	3	1	1	5
67	Trinidad and Tobago (TTO)	3	1	1	5
69	Slovenia (SLO)	2	4	5	11
70	Namibia (NAM)	2	4	4	10
71	Bahrain (BRN)	2	3	5	10
72	Iraq (IRQ)	2	3	2	7
72	Myanmar (MYA)	2	3	2	7
72	Zimbabwe (ZIM)	2	3	2	7
75	Slovakia (SVK)	2	1	5	8
76	Chile (CHI)	2	0	0	2
76	Chinese Taipei (TPE)	2	0	0	2
78	United Arab Emirates (UAE)	1	6	6	13
79	Iceland (ISL)	1	5	6	12
80	Indonesia (INA)	1	5	4	10
81	Jordan (JOR)	1	4	2	7
82	Estonia (EST)	1	3	2	6
83	Puerto Rico (PUR)	1	2	2	5
83	Saudi Arabia (KSA)	1	2	2	5
85	Ethiopia (ETH)	1	2	0	3
86	Pakistan (PAK)	1	1	1	3
87	Costa Rica (CRC)	1	1	0	2
87	Independent Paralympic Participants (IPP)	1	1	0	2
89	Sri Lanka (SRI)	1	0	3	4
90	Ecuador (ECU)	1	0	2	3
91	Botswana (BOT)	1	0	0	1
91	Dominican Republic (DOM)	1	0	0	1
91	Fiji (FIJ)	1	0	0	1
91	Sudan (SUD)	1	0	0	1
95	East Germany (GDR)	0	3	0	3
96	Bahamas (BAH)	0	2	2	4
97	Luxembourg (LUX)	0	2	1	3
98	Cyprus (CYP)	0	2	0	2
99	Palestine (PLE)	0	1	2	3
100	Malta (MLT)	0	1	1	2
100	Uganda (UGA)	0	1	1	2
102	Papua New Guinea (PNG)	0	1	0	1
103	Cape Verde (CPV)	0	0	1	1
103	Moldova (MDA)	0	0	1	1
103	Mozambique (MOZ)	0	0	1	1
103	Oman (OMA)	0	0	1	1
103	Peru (PER)	0	0	1	1
103	Qatar (QAT)	0	0	1	1
103	Rwanda (RWA)	0	0	1	1
103	Serbia and Montenegro (SCG)	0	0	1	1
103	Turkey (TUR)	0	0	1	1
103	Uruguay (URU)	0	0	1	1
103	Vietnam (VIE)	0	0	1	1
Totals (113 entries)		2,986	2,932	2,811	8,729

=== Multi-medallists ===
Athletes who achieved more than three medals in the Paralympic Games. Updated to 2016 Summer Paralympics.

==== T/F11 – 13 ====
No.	Athlete	Country	Class	Years	Athletic event	Gender	Gold	Silver	Bronze	Total
1	Omara Durand	Cuba	T12/T13	2012–2020	100m 200m 400m	F	10	0	0	10
2	Assia El Hannouni	France	T12/T13	2004–2012	100m 200m 400m 800m 1500m	F	8	2	0	10
3	Maher Bouallegue	Tunisia	T13	2000–2004	800m 1500m 5000m 10000m	M	6	1	0	7
4	Jason Smyth	Ireland	T13	2008–2020	100m 200m	M	6	0	0	6
5	José Sayovo	Angola	T11	2004–2012	100m 200m 400m	M	4	3	2	9
6	Li Duan	China	F11	2000–2012	Long jump Triple jump	M	4	2	2	8
7	Liu Cuiqing	China	T11	2016–2020	100m 200m 400m 4x100m	F	4	2	1	7
8	Adria Santos	Brazil	T11/T12	1996–2008	100m 200m 400m 4x100m	F	3	4	1	8
9	Adekundo Adesoji	Nigeria	T12	2004	100m 200m 400m	M	3	0	0	3
9	Royal Mitchell	United States	T13	2000–2008	100m 200m 400m 4×100m relay	M	3	0	0	3
11	Ilse Hayes	South Africa	T13/F13	2004–2016	100m 400m Long Jump	F	2	4	1	7
12	Li Yansong	China	T12	2008–2012	100m 200m 400m 4×100m relay	M	2	3	2	7
13	Nathan Meyer	South Africa	T13	2000–2004	100m 200m	M	2	1	0	3
14	Ildar Pomykalov	Russia	T12	1996–2008	5000m Marathon	M	2	0	2	4
15	Oksana Boturchuk	Ukraine	T12	2008–2024	100m 200m 400m	F	1	9	2	12
16	Carlos Amaral Ferreira	Portugal	T11	1996–2004	10000m Marathon	M	1	3	1	5
17	André Andrade	Brazil	T13	2000–2008	100m 200m	M	1	3	0	4
18	Diosmani Gonzalez	Cuba	T12	1996–2004	5000m 10000m	M	1	2	0	3
19	Ananias Shikongo	Namibia	T11	2000–2012	100m 200m 400m	M	1	1	2	4
20	Mohamed Amguoun	Morocco	T13	2012–2020	400m	M	1	1	1	3
21	José Alves	Portugal	T13	2000–2004	100m 200m 400m 4×100m relay 4×400 m relay	M	1	0	3	4
22	Lex Gillette	United States	F11	2004–2020	Long jump	M	0	5	0	5
23	Odair Santos	Brazil	T11	2004–2016	800m 1500m 5000m 10000m	M	0	4	4	8
24	Luis Bullido	Spain	T11	2000–2004	100m 200m 400m 4×400 m relay	M	0	4	1	5
25	Jason Dunkerley	Canada	T11	2000–2012	800m 1500m 5000m	M	0	3	2	5
26	Ricardo Santana	Venezuela	T12	2000–2008	100m 200m 4×100m relay	M	0	2	3	5
27	Johannes Nambala	Namibia	T13	2016–2020	100m 400m 5000m	M	0	2	1	3
28	Gautier Makunda	France	T11	2004–2012	100m 4×100m relay	M	0	1	4	5
29	Kestutis Bartkenas	Lithuania	T11/13	1996–2004	5000m 10000m	M	0	1	3	4
29	Oleksandr Ivaniukhin	Ukraine	T11/F11/P11	2000–2008	100m 200m 400m Long jump Triple jump Pentathlon	M	0	1	3	4
31	Stuart McGregor	Canada	T13	1996–2004	800m 1500m	M	0	1	2	3

==== T/F32 – 38 ====
No.	Athlete	Country	Class	Years	Athletic event(s)	Gender	Gold	Silver	Bronze	Total
1	Hannah Cockroft	Great Britain	T34	2012–2024	100m 200m 400m 800m	F	8	0	0	8
2	So Wa Wai	Hong Kong	T36	1996–2012	100m 200m 400m 4×100m relay	M	6	3	3	12
3	Alex Hermans	Belgium	C6/F36	1980–2000	Discus throw Long jump Shot put	M	6	1	1	8
4	Darren Thrupp	Australia	F/T37	1992–2008	100m 200m 4×100m relay Long jump	M	6	0	3	9
5	Zhou Xia	China	T35	2016–2024	100m 200m	F	6	0	0	6
6	Lisa McIntosh	Australia	T37/T38	2000–2008	100m 200m 400m	F	5	1	1	7
7	David Larson	United States	C3-4/T33	1988–2000	100m 200m 400m 800m	M	5	0	3	8
8	Mohamed Allek	Algeria	T36-37	1996–2008	100m 200m 400m	M	5	0	1	6
9	Benny Govaerts	Belgium	C7/T37	1988–2004	800m 1500m 5000m	M	4	1	2	7
10	Kim Du-chun	South Korea	C6/T35	1988–2000	100m 200m 400m	M	4	1	1	6
11	Wang Fang	China	T36/T38	2004–2008	100m 200m 400m	M	4	1	0	5
12	Shi Yiting	China	T36	2016–2024	100m 200m	F	4	0	0	4
13	Peter Haber	Germany	C7/T36/F36	1992–2000	100m 200m 400m Long jump	M	3	5	0	8
14	Willem Noorduin	Netherlands	C5/F35	1988–2008	Discus throw Shot put	M	3	4	2	9
15	Malcolm Pringle	South Africa	T37/38	1996–2004	400m 800m 1500m	M	3	3	1	7
16	Stephen Payton	Great Britain	T37/38	1996–2008	100m 200m 400m 4×100m relay	M	3	2	4	9
17	Freeman Register	United States	C5-6/T35	1992–2000	100m 200m 4×100m relay	M	3	1	2	6
18	Andrzej Wrobel	Poland	C7-8/T37	1992–2000	800m 1500m	M	3	1	1	5
19	James Shaw	Canada	F34/37	1996–2004	Discus throw Javelin throw Shot put	M	3	0	1	4
19	Elena Sviridova	Russia	T36	2012–2020	100m 200m 4x100m relay	F	3	0	1	4
21	Ross Davis	United States	C3-4/T34	1992–2000	100m 200m 400m 800m	M	2	4	3	9
22	Ahmed Hassan Mahmoud	Egypt	C7/T36-37	1992–2000	100m 200m 400m	M	1	1	4	6
23	Shing Chung Chan	Hong Kong	C7-8/T38	1988–2000	100m 4×100m relay	M	1	1	3	5
24	Isabelle Foerder	Germany	T37	1996–2004	100m 200m	F	0	4	1	5
25	Fernando Gomez	Spain	T35	1996	100m 200m 400m 4×100m relay	M	0	3	0	3
26	Lamouri Rahmouni	France	T36	1992–2000	400m 4×100m relay	M	0	2	1	3

== Events ==
Note that not all events at a particular games are competed across all classifications

=== Men's events ===
Event	60	64	68	72	76	80	84	88	92	96	00	04	08	12	16	20	24
Current program
100 metres		●	●	●	●	●	●	●	●	●	●	●	●	●	●	●	●
200 metres					●	●	●	●	●	●	●	●	●	●	●	●	●
400 metres					●	●	●	●	●	●	●	●	●	●	●	●	●
800 metres					●	●	●	●	●	●	●	●	●	●	●	●	●
1500 metres					●	●	●	●	●	●	●	●	●	●	●	●	●
5000 metres							●	●	●	●	●	●	●	●	●	●	●
Marathon							●	●	●	●	●	●	●	●	●	●	●
4×100metres relay		●			●	●	●	●	●	●	●	●	●	●	●	●	●
High jump					●	●	●	●	●	●	●	●	●	●	●	●	●
Long jump					●	●	●	●	●	●	●	●	●	●	●	●	●
Shot put	●	●	●	●	●	●	●	●	●	●	●	●	●	●	●	●	●
Discus throw		●	●	●	●	●	●	●	●	●	●	●	●	●	●	●	●
Javelin throw	●	●	●	●	●	●	●	●	●	●	●	●	●	●	●	●	●
Club throw	●	●	●		●	●	●	●	●	●	●	●	●	●	●	●	●
Past events
20 metres							●										
60 metres			●	●	●	●	●	●									
80 metres						●											
10,000 meters								●	●	●	●	●	●				
1500 metres race walk					●		●										
5000 metres walk						●	●										
4 x 40 metres relay			●		●												
4 x 60 metres relay				●	●	●											
4 x 80 metres relay						●											
4 x 200 metres relay							●	●									
4×400 metres relay							●	●	●	●	●	●	●	●			
Triple jump						●	●	●	●	●	●	●	●	●			
Precision javelin	●		●	●	●	●		●									
Football accuracy					●												
Football distance					●												
Slalom		●	●	●	●	●	●	●									
Pentathlon	●	●	●	●	●	●	●	●	●	●	●	●	●				

=== Women's events ===
Event	60	64	68	72	76	80	84	88	92	96	00	04	08	12	16	20	24
Current program
100 metres					●	●	●	●	●	●	●	●	●	●	●	●	●
200 metres					●	●	●	●	●	●	●	●	●	●	●	●	●
400 metres					●	●	●	●	●	●	●	●	●	●	●	●	●
800 metres					●	●	●	●	●	●	●	●	●	●	●	●	●
1500 metres					●	●	●	●	●	●	●	●	●	●	●	●	●
5000 metres							●	●	●	●	●	●	●	●	●	●	●
Marathon							●	●	●	●	●	●	●	●	●	●	●
4×100metres relay							●	●	●				●	●	●	●	●
Long jump					●	●	●	●	●	●	●	●	●	●	●	●	●
Shot put	●	●	●	●	●	●	●	●	●	●	●	●	●	●	●	●	●
Discus throw		●	●	●	●	●	●	●	●	●	●	●	●	●	●	●	●
Javelin throw	●	●	●	●	●	●	●	●	●	●	●	●	●	●	●	●	●
Club throw	●	●	●		●	●	●	●						●	●	●	●
Past events
20 metres								●									
4 x 40 metre relay			●	●	●												
4 x 60 metre relay						●											
4 x 200 metre relay							●	●									
60 metres			●	●	●	●											
1000 metres cross country							●										
3000 metres						●	●	●	●	●							
10,000 metres								●	●	●							
High jump					●	●	●				●						
Precision club throw					●			●									
Precision javelin			●	●	●		●										
Slalom		●	●	●	●	●	●	●									
Pentathlon			●	●	●	●	●	●	●	●	●						

== Nations ==
Event	60	64	68	72	76	80	84	88	92	96	00	04	08	12	16	20	Total
Afghanistan (AFG)												2			1		2
Algeria (ALG)									2	7	6	14	23	23	21		7
Angola (ANG)										2	1	4	6	4	4		6
Antigua and Barbuda (ANT)														1			1
Argentina (ARG)		9	18	19	15	5	6	6	9	6	10	9	8	8	12		14
Australia (AUS)	3	4	22	21	26	36	54	76	49	42	65	43	47	43	45		15
Austria (AUT)	5	6	20	27	37	36	30	24	18	18	17	15	7	6	5		15
Azerbaijan (AZE)										1	3	6	7	8	10		6
Bahamas (BAH)				1	6	6	2	4									5
Bahrain (BRN)							12	9	3	4	2	3	2	2	2		9
Bangladesh (BAN)												1	1				2
Belarus (BLR)										8	16	16	18	7	6		6
Belgium (BEL)			10	10	23	37	18	15	18	11	7	3	3	3	5		13
Benin (BEN)											1	1		1	1		4
Bermuda (BER)														1	1		2
Bosnia and Herzegovina (BIH)										2	1	1	2	1	2		6
Botswana (BOT)												1			1		2
Brazil (BRA)				7	15	1	25	34	13	12	10	17	47	35	61		12
Brunei (BRU)														1			1
Bulgaria (BUL)								3	5	4	4	6	7	7	5		8
Burkina Faso (BUR)															1		1
Burundi (BDI)													3	1	1		3
Cambodia (CAM)												2	1	1	1		4
Cameroon (CMR)															1		1
Canada (CAN)			22	35	66	66	114	79	47	40	44	39	26	22	22		13
Cape Verde (CPV)												1	1	1	2		4
Central African Republic (CAF)													1	1	1		3
Chile (CHI)											1	1	1	1	4		5
China (CHN)							12	19	12	15	27	74	80	80	75		9
Chinese Taipei (TPE)									5	4	1	4	1	4	2		7
Colombia (COL)					10	8		11	3	2	1	1	1	11	19		10
Republic of the Congo (CGO)															1		1
Costa Rica (CRC)									2		1			1	1		4
Croatia (CRO)									1	3	7	6	13	14	11		7
Cuba (CUB)									8	8	7	15	17	11	11		7
Cyprus (CYP)								3	2	3	2	1	1	1	1		8
Czech Republic (CZE)										14	20	21	25	15	11		6
Czechoslovakia (TCH)				19		5			14								3
Democratic Republic of the Congo (COD)														2	1		2
Denmark (DEN)				1	13	25	11	7	3	3	5	4	3	6	7		12
Djibouti (DJI)														1			1
Dominican Republic (DOM)									1	2		2	1	1	1		6
East Germany (GDR)							4										1
Ecuador (ECU)					2		2		3	2	2	1			5		7
Egypt (EGY)				1	23	28	18	9	3	17	14	15	6	6	7		12
El Salvador (ESA)											1	2	1	1			4
Estonia (EST)									3	4	4	1		2	2		6
Ethiopia (ETH)			2		1							1	2	4	5		6
Fiji (FIJ)					8					2	2	1	1	1	1		7
Finland (FIN)			2	15	40	49	34	24	13	11	4	5	4	7	7		13
France (FRA)	1	1	12	11	8	21	27	20	18	21	24	27	25	25	20		15
Gabon (GAB)													1	1	1		3
The Gambia (GAM)														2	1		2
Germany (GER)	4	4							63	61	70	53	42	33	38		9
Ghana (GHA)												2	2	2	1		4
Great Britain (GBR)	3	11	33	33	30	36	130	64	62	62	46	35	35	48	54		15
Greece (GRE)					1	5	3	2	5	11	19	32	29	25	18		11
Guatemala (GUA)												2	1	1	1		4
Guinea (GUI)												1	1		1		3
Guinea-Bissau (GBS)														2	1		2
Haiti (HAI)														2	1		2
Honduras (HON)										2	1	2	1	1			5
Hong Kong (HKG)				9	9	6	17	14	6	5	7	3	2	2	1		12
Hungary (HUN)				4	1		12	4	6	6	8	2		4	5		10
Iceland (ISL)						3	5	3	2	2	2	1	2	2	1		10
Individual Paralympic Athletes (IPA)											1				1		2
Independent Paralympic Participants (IPP)									7								1
India (IND)			9	9			4	2	9	7	1	10	2	5	15		11
Indonesia (INA)					12	12	8	10			3			1	2		7
Iran (IRI)								17	14	7	12	28	14	16	26		8
Iraq (IRQ)									7		3	3	1	8	6		6
Ireland (IRL)		1	2	11	12	17	43	33	28	28	17	11	10	10	10		14
Israel (ISR)		4	26	19	32	14	10	4	5	3	2	1	1	1	1		14
Italy (ITA)	9	7	22	13	15	28	34	39	27	18	21	20	10	11	13		15
Ivory Coast (CIV)											1	1	2	2	4		5
Jamaica (JAM)			7	17		13	1	4	3	3	3	4	4	3	3		12
Japan (JPN)		1	38	24	31	24	28	64	20	19	38	34	31	36	36		14
Jordan (JOR)							7	4		4	2	3	5	3	1		8
Kazakhstan (KAZ)											1	6	1	3	1		5
Kenya (KEN)				3		17	13	8	13	16	12	15	12	13	7		11
Kuwait (KUW)						9	17	18	13	11	16	10	3	5	5		10
Latvia (LAT)									2	5	5	7	4	6	4		7
Lebanon (LBN)											2						1
Lesotho (LES)											2	2	1	1	2		5
Libya (LBA)														1	1		2
Liechtenstein (LIE)							1	1									2
Lithuania (LTU)									4	8	9	11	8	4	4		7
Luxembourg (LUX)							3								1		2
Macau (MAC)								7	2	1	1	1	1	1			7
Madagascar (MAD)											1			1	1		3
Malawi (MAW)															1		1
Malaysia (MAS)				3				9	5	3	3	2	1	8	9		9
Mali (MLI)														1	2		2
Malta (MLT)	2	1	6	8		3							1				6
Mauritania (MTN)											1	1		2			3
Mauritius (MRI)										2		2	1	1	1		5
Mexico (MEX)				5	29	23	47	20	13	15	24	40	34	38	27		12
Moldova (MDA)										3	6	2			1		4
Mongolia (MGL)											1	2		1	1		4
Montenegro (MNE)														1	1		2
Morocco (MAR)								5	2	2	1	6	14	15	14		8
Mozambique (MOZ)														2	1		2
Myanmar (MYA)					4		10		1				1	1	1		6
Namibia (NAM)									2				1	4	7		4
Nepal (NEP)												1	1	2	1		4
Netherlands (NED)	1	3	14	13	17	29	16	15	15	7	8	9	8	11	14		15
New Zealand (NZL)			12	10	12	15	10	11	6	7	9	7	5	3	8		13
Nicaragua (NCA)												1		2	2		3
Niger (NIG)												1		2	2		3
Nigeria (NGR)									1	1	4	4	9	9	6		7
North Korea (PRK)															2		1
Norway (NOR)			8	5	15	21	31	11	9	4	8	5	2	1	2		13
Oman (OMA)								5	4	2	1			1	2		6
Pakistan (PAK)									1			9	2	2	1		5
Palestine (PLE)											2	2	2	2	1		5
Panama (PAN)									2	1	1	1	1	2	2		7
Papua New Guinea (PNG)							4				2		2	1	2		5
Peru (PER)					1							1		1	5		4
Philippines (PHI)								3			1			1	1		4
Poland (POL)				9	18	43	20	17	10	17	27	25	29	31	31		12
Portugal (POR)							15	10	11	12	16	11	13	15	17		9
Puerto Rico (PUR)								5	3	2	2	1	1	1			7
Qatar (QAT)											1	1	1	1	3		5
Rhodesia (RHO)		3	7	4													3
Romania (ROU)														1	2		2
Russia (RUS)										20	22	24	39	53			5
Rwanda (RWA)												2	1	2	1		4
Samoa (SAM)											1	2	1	2	2		5
San Marino (SMR)														1			1
São Tomé and Príncipe (STP)															1		1
Saudi Arabia (KSA)											4	2	2	3	3		5
Senegal (SEN)												2	2	1	2		4
Serbia (SRB)													6	4	6		3
Serbia and Montenegro (SCG)											1	2					2
Seychelles (SEY)									2						1		2
Sierra Leone (SLE)										1				1			2
Singapore (SGP)								7	4	1	1	2	1		3		7
Slovakia (SVK)										4	8	5	5	4	2		6
Slovenia (SLO)									5	4	5	3	4	4	1		7
Solomon Islands (SOL)														1			1
Somalia (SOM)															1		1
South Africa (RSA)		3	8	19	33				8	18	29	24	17	25	19		11
South Korea (KOR)			2	2	1	24	5	47	12	16	8	9	8	6	5		13
Soviet Union (URS)								14									1
Spain (ESP)			5	6	16	14	7	11	67	59	56	36	24	24	22		13
Sri Lanka (SRI)										1	1	1	3	5	7		6
Sudan (SUD)						10						2					2
Suriname (SUR)												2	1	1	1		4
Sweden (SWE)				14	20	25	25	13	14	15	14	6	6	7	5		12
Switzerland (SUI)	1		16	28	38	45	26	20	19	18	18	15	14	12	11		14
Syria (SYR)													1	2	1		3
Tajikistan (TJK)															1		1
Tanzania (TAN)												2	1	1	1		4
Thailand (THA)							1	6	4	3	12	12	11	15	13		9
Timor-Leste (TLS)														1	2		2
Tonga (TGA)											1	1	1	1	2		5
Trinidad and Tobago (TTO)							7	1						1	2		4
Tunisia (TUN)								1	1	3	9	22	33	31	31		8
Turkey (TUR)												1	1	5	10		4
Turkmenistan (TKM)														1			1
Uganda (UGA)				2	1							1		2	1		5
Ukraine (UKR)										7	22	24	28	31	26		6
Unified Team (EUN)									19								1
United Arab Emirates (UAE)										4	12	9	5	11	11		6
United States (USA)	2	24	61	43	70	95	167	195	122	109	73	42	43	54	73		15
Uruguay (URU)									2	1	1	1	1		1		6
Uzbekistan (UZB)														6	11		2
Vanuatu (VAN)											2			1			2
Venezuela (VEN)							5		3	1		6	16	15	13		7
Vietnam (VIE)											1	1	3	3	3		5
Virgin Islands (ISV)															1		1
West Germany (FRG)		1	39	49	63	77	74	64									7
Yemen (YEM)									2								1
Yugoslavia (YUG)				20		24	16	10		2	2						6
Zambia (ZAM)										1	2		1	2			4
Zimbabwe (ZIM)						3	7			2	2	2	2	1	1		8
Nations	10	16	26	39	39	40	51	57	74	84	104	116	111	141	146		
Competitors	31	82	423	549	774	936	1198	1141	928	908	1044	1064	1028	1133	1140		
Year	60	64	68	72	76	80	84	88	92	96	00	04	08	12	16	20	

== See also ==
- Athletics at the Summer Olympics
- Marathon at the Paralympics
- World Para Athletics Championships
