= List of Paralympic medalists in athletics =

Athletics was one of the first eight sports to be competed in the Summer Paralympics which began in 1960. At the time it debuted, only track events were held: club throw, javelin throw, pentathlon (for male athletes) precision club throw and shot put which held between men and women. They were held between three classes per event: class A, B and C. The first multi-medallist Maria Scutti from Italy won almost all events for women by gaining nine gold medals and made her team top the medal table. In the 1964 Summer Paralympics, track events were featured for the first for only wheelchair competitors where 60m and 100m (for male competitors) races were in place as well as 4x40m relay race. Slalom and pentathlon events began in the 1968 Summer Paralympics.

Heidelberg saw more track events added: as well as wheelchair competitors, competitors with different disabilities took part leading the total of events (both field and track) held in athletics to 207.

== Events ==
=== Defunct events ===
Athletic events that were previously scheduled in the Paralympic Games.

- Defunct Paralympic field events
- Defunct individual track events
- Defunct relay track events

=== Current field events ===
Changed to current "F-" classes in 1996.

- Club throw (held since 1960)
- Discus throw (held since 1964)
- High jump (held since 1976)
- Javelin throw (held since 1960)
- Long jump (held since 1976)
- Shot put (held since 1960)

=== Current track events ===
Changed to current "T-" classes in 1996.

- 100m (held since 1964)
- 200m (held since 1976)
- 400m (held since 1976)
- 800m (held since 1980)
- 1500m (held since 1980)
- 5000m (held since 1984)
- 4 x 100m relay (held since 1980)
- Marathon (held since 1984)

== See also ==
- List of Olympic medalists in athletics (men)
- List of Olympic medalists in athletics (women)
