= Joseph Ngorialuk =

Kenyan Paralympic athlete

Medal record

Paralympic athletics

Representing Kenya

Paralympic Games
Gold medal – first place	2004 Athens	5000 metres - T13

Joseph Ngorialuk is a paralympic athlete from Kenya competing mainly in category T13 distance events.

Joseph competed in both the Marathon and 5000m at the 2004 Summer Paralympics winning the gold medal in the shorter distance.
