= Scot Hollonbeck =

American wheelchair racer (born 1969)

Medal record

Men's athletics

Representing the United States

Paralympic Games
Gold medal – first place	1992 Barcelona	4×400 m relay TW3–4
Gold medal – first place	1992 Barcelona	800 m TW4
Silver medal – second place	1992 Barcelona	1500 m TW3–4
Silver medal – second place	1996 Atlanta	1500 m T52–53
Silver medal – second place	1996 Atlanta	800 m T53

Scot Hollonbeck (born 1969) is an American wheelchair racer, who competed at the Olympic and Paralympic level. At the 1996 Olympic Games, he placed second in the 1500m wheelchair racing event. 2000 Summer Olympic Games, he placed fourth in the 1500m wheelchair racing event. At the 2004 Olympic Games, he finished 4th in the 1500m wheelchair racing event. Men's 1500m wheelchair. At the 1992 Olympic Games, he finished 5th in the 1500m wheelchair racing event. Men's 1500m wheelchairHe competed in four consecutive Summer Olympic finals, winning one silver medal and Summer Paralympics from 1992 to 2004, winning a total of two gold and three silver medals and one bronze.

Hollonbeck became a paraplegic at age 14 after being hit by a van while bicycling to swim practice. Only days after the accident, while still in the hospital, he watched a wheelchair race on television where Sharon Hedrick broke the world record in the 800 meters. Having been a competitive runner he immediately became interested in the sport and attended a camp for disabled athletes at the University of Illinois the next summer.

While attending Rochelle Township High School in Rochelle, Illinois, he was a member of the school's track and field team. As a sophomore, he was allowed to race in a wheelchair division. As the only wheeler he often raced in mixed heats with runners, the wheeler and runner heats were scored separately. For his last two years of high school, however, the school barred him from competing in mixed heats with runners because of safety issues. Despite the fact that Scot trained every day with the runner in mixed practices, he was deemed "unsafe" during competition. In 1987 Hollonbeck filed a lawsuit against the school system. This was the first case in the country concerning the right for disabled students to compete on their school teams. In late 1988, after he had graduated from the school, a federal judge ruled that school officials had violated his civil rights, as provided for in the Rehabilitation Act of 1973, by not allowing him to argue his case. The judge did not rule on whether high school wheelchair athletes should be able to compete alongside or against their non-disabled peers.

Hollonbeck received an athletic scholarship to the University of Illinois and was a member of the school's wheelchair basketball and track and field teams. He later moved to Atlanta, Georgia to work for The Coca-Cola Company in the Worldwide Sports Department. Hollonbeck was awarded the 1999 United Nations Outstanding Athlete Award for his work on and off the track. He served as the International Paralympic Committee's sport of Athletics elected athlete representative from 1998 through 2002. He also served on the United States Olympic Committees Athletes Advisory Committee from 1998 through 2002. Seeing the need to bring in new corporate funding for the US Paralympic movement he founded Vie Sports Marketing Inc which was selected as United States Olympic Committee exclusive Paralympic Marketing Agency from 2002 to 2004. After over a decade of disabled athlete and sport inclusion challenges Hollonbeck returned to the courts for relief. Hollonbeck along with Tony Iniguez and Jacob Heilveil filed an athlete discrimination lawsuit in 2003 against the United States Olympic Committee. The case made its way to the US Supreme Court and was instrumental in fundamentally changing the USOC's Paralympic Athlete policy and funding. In his spare time, Hollonbeck has served numerous organizations focussed on health, wellness and environmental resilience. In his mid to late 40's he returned to competing in the sport of triathlon ultimately qualifying and competing in the Ironman Kona World Championships in 2013 and 2016. He continues to be a disabled sports policy and disability rights advocate.
