= José Pámpano =

Spanish Paralympic athlete

Personal information
- Full name: José María Pámpano Cillero
- Nationality: Spanish
- Born: 10 December 1978 (age 47) Badajoz, Badajoz, Spain

Sport
- Country: Spain
- Sport: Track and field (T36)
Medal record
Men's para athletics
Representing Spain
Paralympic Games
Silver medal – second place	2004 Athens	1500 metres – T36

José María Pámpano Cillero (born 10 December 1978) is a Paralympic athlete from Spain competing mainly in T36 middle-distance events. He won a silver medal at the 2004 Summer Paralympics.

== Personal ==
Pámpano was born on 10 December 1978, in Badajoz. He has cerebral palsy, a condition he has had since birth, is deaf and mute. In 2012, he was residing in Albuquerque, Badajoz. In January 2013, he was part of the ceremony at the official launching of the C.A. Perceiana-Extremadura, an athletics club.

== Athletics ==
Pámpano is a Paralympic athlete from Spain competing mainly in T36 middle-distance events. He does not participate in the 5,000 meters because it is not available to T36 classified athletes on the international level.

At the 2001 Nottingham, England hosted World Games, he earned a gold medal in the 1,500 meter event. At the European Athletics Championships in 2001, he won a gold medal in the 1,500 meter T36 race. At the Lille, France hosted 2002 IPC World Championship, he earned a bronze medal in the 1,500 meter T36 rrace, and finished fourth in the 4 × 400 meter T35–T38 race. At the 2003 I EPC European Championship in Assen, Netherlands, he won a gold medal in the T35–T38 4 × 400 meter race, won silver medal in the 1,500 meter race, finished fifth in the T36 long jump. Competing at the 2005 European Athletics Championships in Espoo, Finland, he earned a bronze medal in the 1,500 meter race and finished fourth in the 800 meter T36 race. At the 2006 World Athletics Championships in Assen, the Netherlands, he finished sixth in the 1,500 meters and sixth in the 4 × 400 meter T35–T38 relay. In 2010, he competed in the Valencia Athletics Open, which was organized by the Federació d'Esports Adaptats de la Comunitat Valenciana (FESA). In 2011 and 2012, he was coached by Agustín Rubio. He qualified for the 2011 IPC Athletics World Championships where he was one of thirty-two competitors representing Spain. At the 2011 IPC Athletics World Championship in Christchurch, New Zealand, he finished sixth in the 1,500 meter race and 7th in the 800 meter race. At an international competition in 2011 in Tunisia, he won two gold medals, one in the 1,500 meters and one in the 800 meters. He picked up a silver medal in the 400 meters at the same event. In 2012, he was a recipient of a Plan ADO €2,500 coaching scholarship. During the 2011 season, he almost quit athletics as he tried to prevent himself from getting injured. At the 2012 European Athletics Championships, he set a personal best time in the 800 meters with a time of 2:18.79. He also managed to qualify for the 400 meter finals where he finished fifth. He competed at the Spanish national championships in 2012 where he qualified for the London Paralympics. In July 2013, he participated in the 2013 IPC Athletics World Championships.

=== Paralympics ===
Pámpano competed at three consecutive Paralympic Games: 2004, 2008 and 2012. At the 2004 Summer Paralympics in Athens, he was part of Spanish 4 × 400 m relay; at the same games, he won a silver medal in the T36 1500meter event. He competed in the 800m in the 2008 Summer Paralympics but was unable to medal in it. There was a budget of €12,000 to cover his trip to and time at the Beijing Games with some of the money coming from sponsor Marca Extremadura. Prior to and after the Games, he had access to counseling. As a thirty-one-year-old, he participated at the 2012 Summer Paralympics and finished sixth in the 800 meter race. He qualified for the London Games after meeting the qualifying standards at Spanish national championships in Basauri in the Basque region of Spain. Despite meeting the B standard with a time of 2:19.86, there was some question of his eligibility as 27 total athletes had qualified with only 24 available spots. He was one of three athletes from the Extremadura region to represent Spain at the 2012 Games. Upon his return from London, there was a ceremony presided over by José Antonio Monago, the governor of Extremadura. Over the course of his Paralympic career, his coach said other countries Paralympic movements became more professional while Spain remained at the same level, which was a bit of a detriment to Pámpano.
