= Djamel Mastouri =

French Paralympic athlete

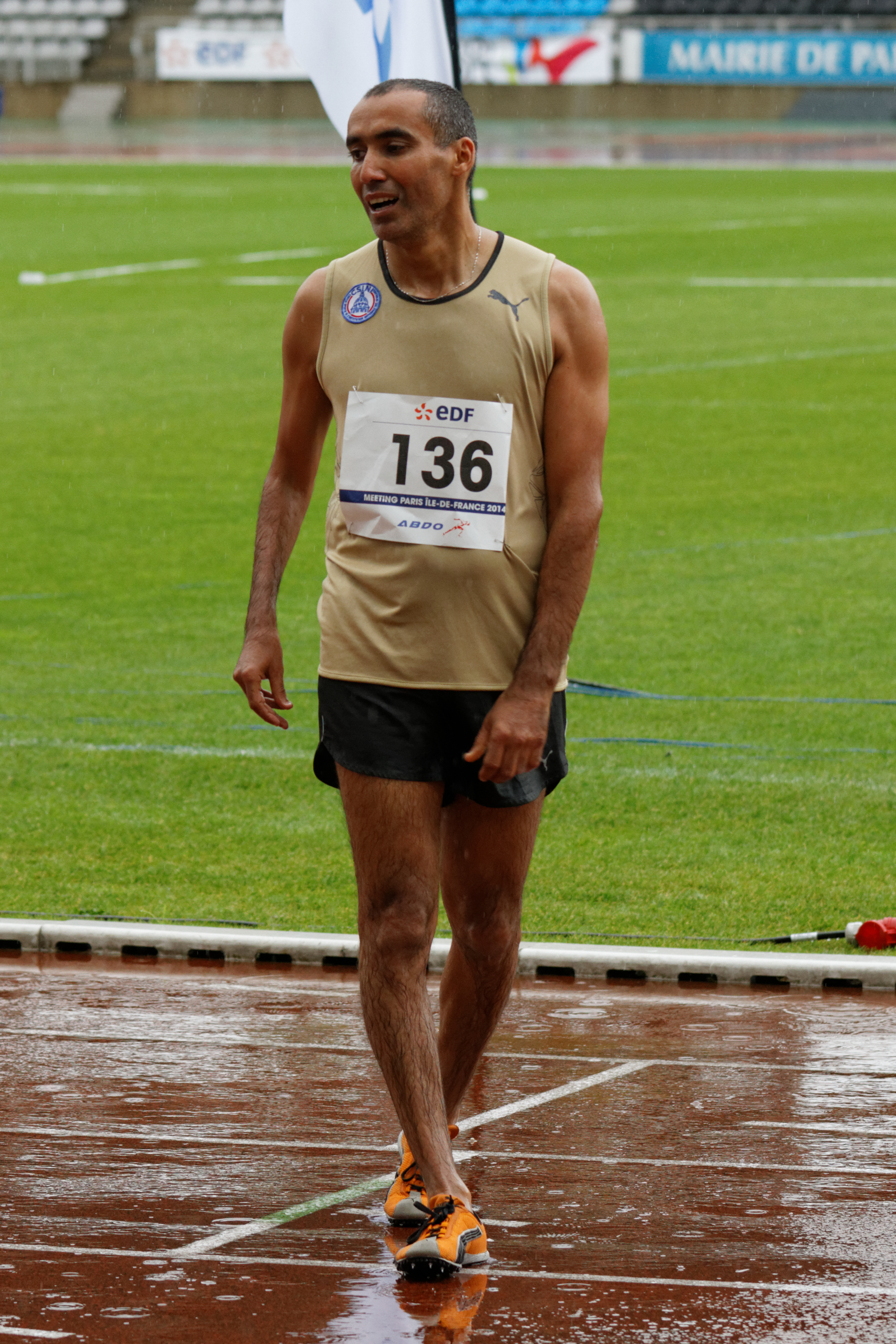
- Mastouri at the 2014 Paris Athletics Paralympic Meeting

Personal information
- Nationality: French
- Born: 17 January 1972 (age 54) Paris, France

Sport
- Sport: Running
- Event: 800 m / 1500 m
Medal record
Men's para athletics (T37)
Representing France
Paralympic Games
| Bronze medal – third place | 2008 Beijing | 800 m - T37 |

Djamel Mastouri (born 17 January 1972) is a Paralympian athlete from France competing mainly in category T37 middle-distance events.

He competed in the 2008 Summer Paralympics in Beijing, China. There he won a bronze medal in the men's 800 metres - T37 event.

== Personal life ==
Born in France, Mastouri is of Tunisian descent.
