= Pamela McGonigle =

US athlete, competed at the 1992, 2000 & 2004 Paralymic Games

Personal information
- Born: 12 March 1968 (age 58) Pittsburgh, Pennsylvania

Sport
- Sport: Paralympic athletics
- Disability: Albinism
- Disability class: T12
Medal record
Paralympic athletics
Representing United States
Paralympic Games
| Gold medal – first place | 1992 Barcelona | 3000m B2 |
| Bronze medal – third place | 1992 Barcelona | 800m B2 |
| Bronze medal – third place | 1992 Barcelona | 1500m B2 |
| Bronze medal – third place | 2000 Sydney | 1500m T12 |
World Championships
| Silver medal – second place | 2002 Lille | 800m T12 |
| Silver medal – second place | 2002 Lille | 1500m T12 |

Pamela "Pam" McGonigle (born 12 March 1968) is an American retired Paralympic athlete who competed in middle-distance running, she competed at four Paralympic Games. She is a Paralympic champion and a double World silver medalist. McGonigle is an ambassador for the United States Association of Blind Athletes and was inducted into the hall of fame in 2013.

== Sporting career ==
McGonigle began her athletics career when she first started running at sixth grade. She qualified to compete at the 1992 Summer Paralympics in Barcelona, her father had terminal cancer and she promised him that she would win a gold medal in his honour. In her first event, McGonigle took part in the 800m B2 and won a bronze medal, in her second event, she won a gold medal in the women's 3000m B2. She believed that her father was her biggest idol while growing up.

After competing at the 2004 Summer Paralympics, McGonigle gave up on running competitively as she found it difficult to find running guides to train with, she got back to running again four years later after she got a specially trained running guide dog that she adopted from the Guiding Eyes for the Blind when she was interested on the organisation's new Running Guide Program.

== Personal life ==
McGonigle now works as a director of development in a school for the visually impaired in Philadelphia, she is also a substitute teacher at the same school.
