= Emanuel Asinikal =

Kenyan Paralympic athlete

Medal record

Paralympic athletics

Representing Kenya

Paralympic Games
Bronze medal – third place	2004 Athens	1500 metres - T13
Bronze medal – third place	2004 Athens	5000 metres - T12

Emanuel Asinikal is a paralympic athlete from Kenya competing mainly in category T13 Middle-distance events.

Emanuel competed in the 2004 Summer Paralympics winning a bronze in both the 1500m and 5000m.
