= Brad Scott (runner) =

Australian Paralympic athlete

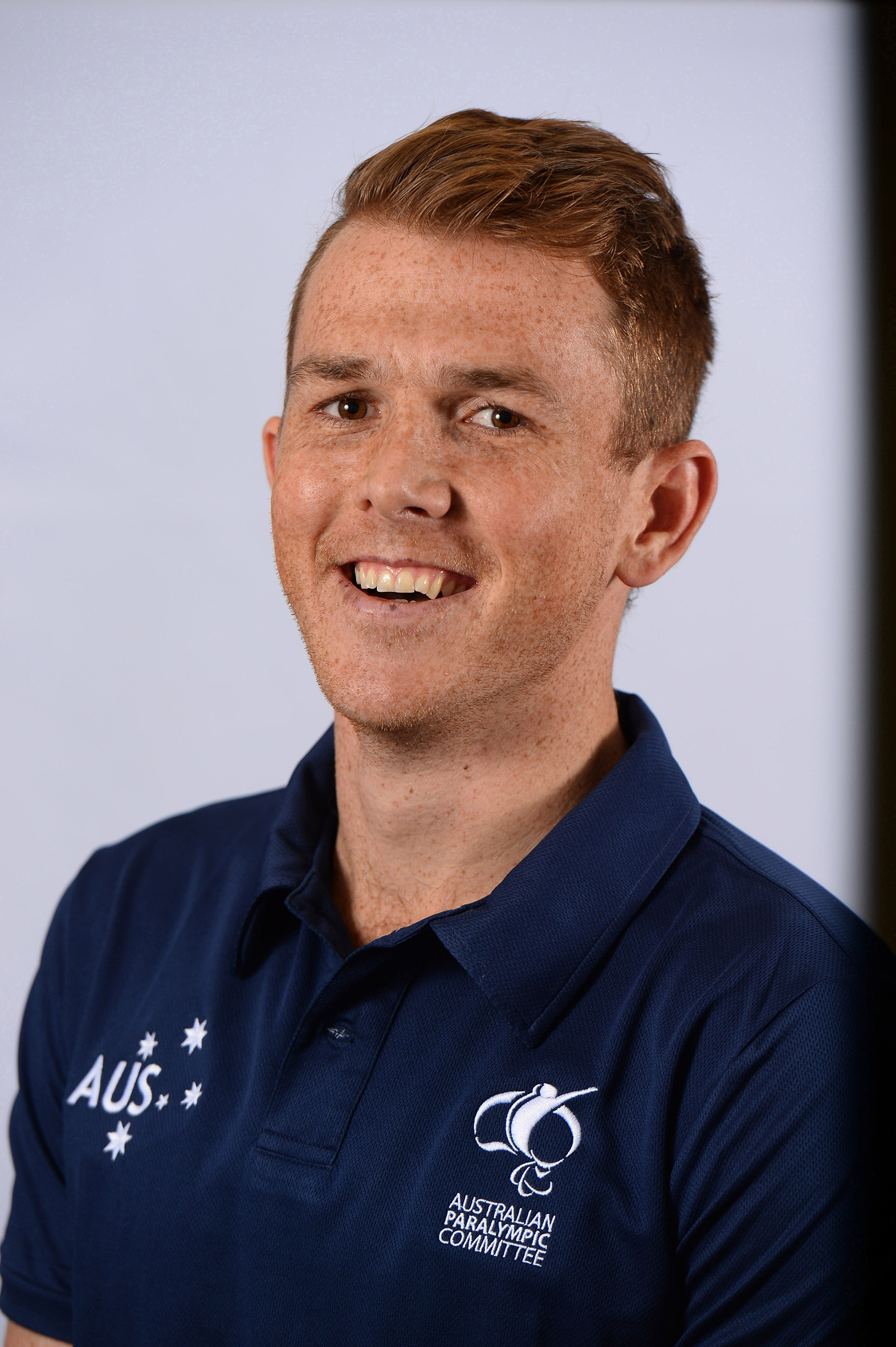
- 2016 Australian Paralympic team portrait of Scott

Personal information
- Full name: Bradley James Scott
- Born: 15 April 1988 (age 38) Liverpool, Sydney
Medal record
Men's athletics (T37)
Representing Australia
Paralympic Games
Silver medal – second place	2008 Beijing	800 m T37
Silver medal – second place	2012 London	1500 m T37
Bronze medal – third place	2012 London	800 m T37
IPC Athletics World Championships
Silver medal – second place	2011 Christchurch	800 m T37
Silver medal – second place	2013 Lyon	800 m T37
Silver medal – second place	2015 Doha	1,500 m T38
Bronze medal – third place	2011 Christchurch	4 x 100 m relay T35–38

Brad Scott (born 15 April 1988) is a Paralympian track and field athlete from Australia competing mainly in category T37 middle-distance events. He represented Australia at the three Paralympics – 2008 to 2016 in athletics and won two silver and one bronze medals.

== Personal ==
He was born on 15 April 1988 with cerebral palsy – right hemiplegia. He has completed degree in Exercise and Coaching Science at the University of Canberra. After his retirement in November 2016, he was moving back to Bunbury, Western Australia to undertake full-time study in primary education at Edith Cowan University. In 2025, he was appointed Western Australian Institute of Sport Para Unit Lead.

== Athletics ==
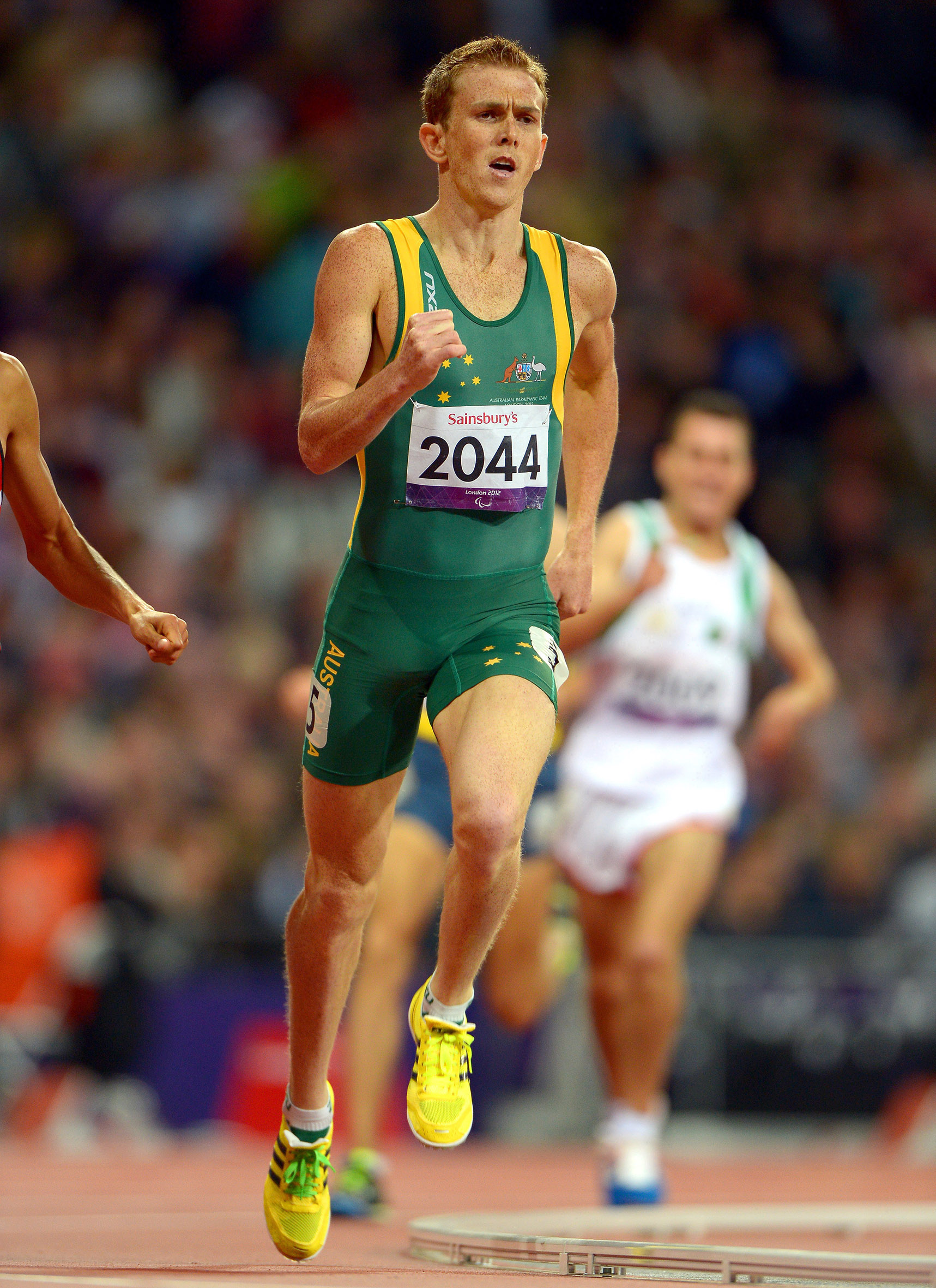
Scott at the 2012 London Paralympics

He competed in the 2008 Summer Paralympics in Beijing, China just two years after taking up running. There he won a silver medal in the Men's 800 m T37 event and finished fourth in the Men's 200 m T37 event.

At the 2011 IPC Athletics World Championships in Christchurch, New Zealand, he won a silver medal in the Men's 800 m T37 and bronze medal in the Men's 4 × 100 m relay T35–38.

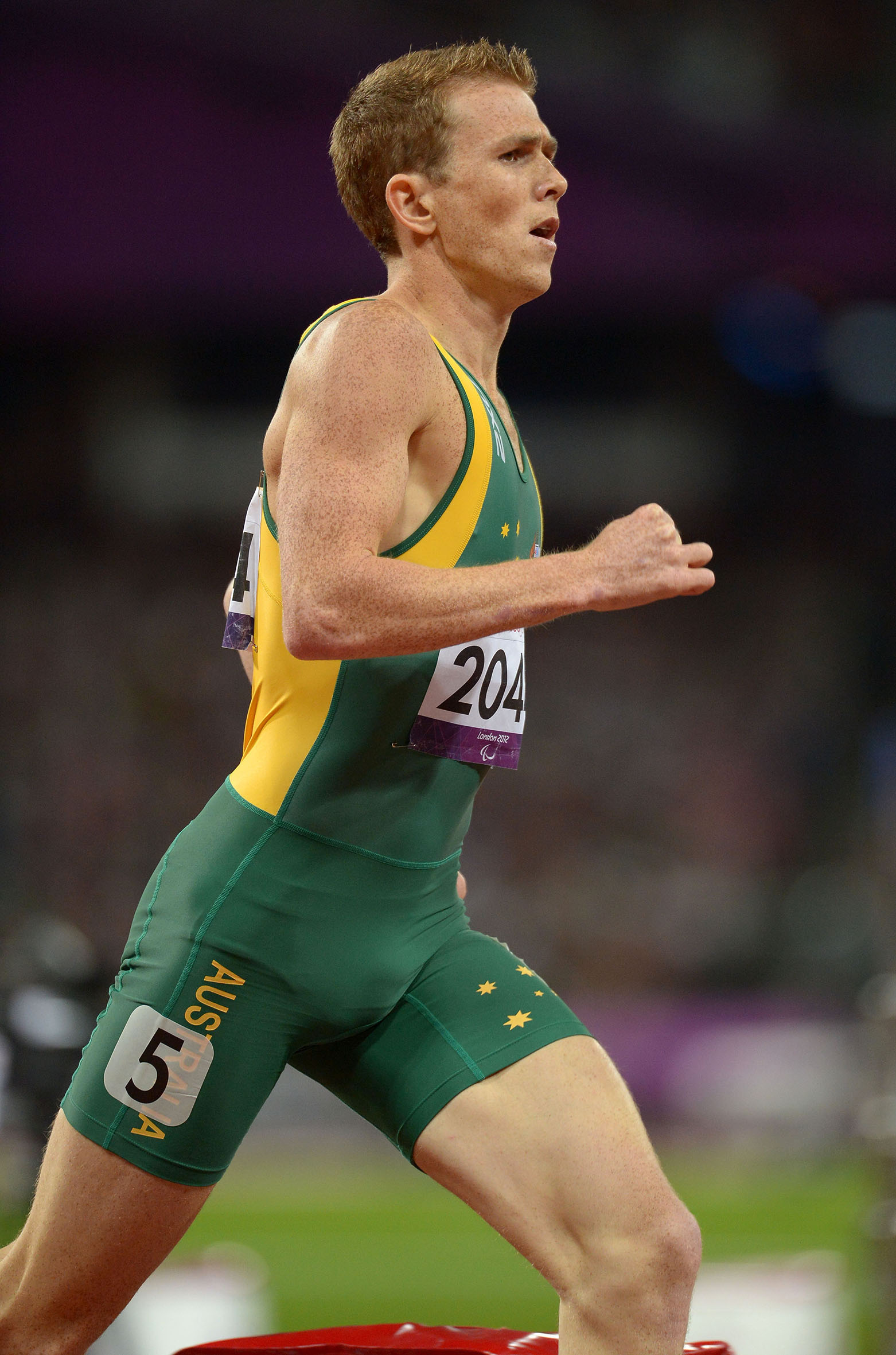
Scott at the 2012 London Paralympics

In 2011, he received a sport achievement award from the Australian Institute of Sport and was training at the AIS in preparation for the 2012 Summer Paralympics.

At the 2012 Summer Paralympics Scott won a silver medal in the Men's 1500 m T37 and a bronze medal in the Men's 800 m T37. At the 2013 IPC Athletics World Championships in Lyon, France, he won a silver medal in the Men's 800 m T37.

Whilst at the Australian Institute of Sport, he was coached by Irina Dvoskina. After the 2012 Summer Paralympics, he returned to Perth and is being coached by Lyn Foreman.

At the 2015 IPC Athletics World Championships in Doha, he won the silver medal in the Men's 1500 m T57 in a time of 4:21.12.

At the 2016 Rio Paralympics, Scott finished fifth in the Men's 1500 m T37. At his media interview at the Rio Games, Scott said " To all those kids back home with a disability – the disability doesn't have to be your excuse; it can be your greatest opportunity.". Scott announced his retirement from competitive athletics in November 2016.
