= Per Vesterlund =

Swedish Paralympic athlete

Medal record

Men's para-athletics

Representing Sweden

Paralympic Games
| Gold medal – first place | 1996 Atlanta | 1500 metres - T51 |
| Silver medal – second place | 2000 Sydney | 1500 metres - T52 |
| Bronze medal – third place | 1996 Atlanta | 800 metres - T51 |

Per Vesterlund is a paralympic athlete from Sweden competing mainly in category T52 track events.

Per has competed in three Paralympics since his first games in 1996. There he competed in the 400m, 800m, 1500m and marathon winning the gold medal in the 1500m and the bronze in the 800m. At his second games in 2000 he moved from the marathon to the 5000m but still did the 400m, 800m and 1500m this time only managing a silver in the 1500m. His last appearance was in 2004 Summer Paralympics where he competed in the 800m, 1500m, 5000m and marathon but he was unable to add further to his medal collection.
