= César Carlavilla =

Spanish Paralympic athlete

Medal record

Track and field (athletics)

Representing Spain

Paralympic Games
Gold medal – first place	2000 Sydney	800 metres - T12
Gold medal – first place	2000 Sydney	1500 metres - T12
Silver medal – second place	1996 Atlanta	1500 metres - T11
Silver medal – second place	2000 Sydney	4x400 metre relay - T13

César Carlavilla Cubillo (born 9 March 1977) is a paralympic athlete from Spain competing mainly in category T12 middle-distance events.

Carlavilla has competed at two Paralympic games first in 1996 then in 2000. At the 1996 games he finished second in his only event the T11 1500m. Four years later in Sydney he improved to gold in T12 1500m and added the T12 800m title, he was also part of the Spanish team that won silver medal in the 4 × 400 m relay for T13 athletes.
