= Christophe Carayon =

French Paralympic athlete

Medal record

Men's para athletics

Representing France

Paralympic Games
Gold medal – first place	1992 Barcelona	1500 metres - B3
Gold medal – first place	1992 Barcelona	800 metres - B3
Bronze medal – third place	1992 Barcelona	400 metres - B3
Bronze medal – third place	1996 Atlanta	1500 metres - T13

Christophe Carayon is a paralympic athlete from France competing mainly in category T13 middle-distance events.

Christophe competed in two Paralympics winning two golds and two bronzes. His first games in 1992 Summer Paralympics gave him his two gold medals in the 800m and 1500m and a bronze in the 400m. The other bronze came in the 1996 Summer Paralympics where he won the bronze in the 1500m but couldn't medal in the 5000m.
