= Jason Dunkerley =

Canadian Paralympic athlete

Personal information
- Nationality: Canada
- Born: August 21, 1977 (age 48) Newtownards, Northern Ireland, UK
- Height: 6 ft (183 cm)
Medal record
Athletics
Paralympic Games
Silver medal – second place	2000 Sydney	1500m – T11
Silver medal – second place	2004 Athens	1500m – T11
Silver medal – second place	2012 London	5000m – T11
Bronze medal – third place	2008 Beijing	1500m – T11
Bronze medal – third place	2012 London	1500m – T11
Parapan American Games
Gold medal – first place	2007 Rio de Janeiro	800m – T11
Gold medal – first place	2007 Rio de Janeiro	15000m – T11
Gold medal – first place	2015 Toronto	5000 m T11
Silver medal – second place	2011 Guadalajara	1500m – T11
Silver medal – second place	2015 Toronto	1500m – T11
Bronze medal – third place	2011 Guadalajara	5000m – T11

Jason Joseph Dunkerley (born August 21, 1977, in Newtownards, Northern Ireland) is a Canadian Paralympian athlete competing mainly in category T11 and T12 middle-distance events.

== Career ==
He competed in the 2000 Summer Paralympics in Sydney, Australia, where he won a silver medal in the T11 men's 1500 metres event and went out in the first round of the T12 men's 800 metres event. At the 2004 Summer Paralympics in Athens, Greece, he won a silver medal in the men's 1500 metres - T11 event and went out in the first round of the men's 800 metres - T12 event. At the 2008 Summer Paralympics in Beijing, China, he won a bronze medal in the men's 1500 metres - T11 event and went out in the first round of the men's 800 metres - T12 event. At the 2012 Summer Paralympics in London, United Kingdom, he won a bronze medal in the men's 1500 metres - T11 and a silver medal in the men's 5000 metres - T11.

== Personal life ==
Jason Dunkerley was born in Newtownards, Northern Ireland with Leber's congenital amaurosis, a rare inherited eye disease that appears at birth or in the first few months of life, and affects around 1 in 80,000 of the population. He has two brothers, Jonathan and Chris, who both inherited the same eye condition. After emigrating to Hamilton from Northern Ireland with his family in 1991, he attended the W. Ross Macdonald School for Students who are Visually Impaired, Blind and Deafblind, where students were encouraged to get involved in sports. He graduated from the University of Guelph with a degree in International Development. Jason's brother Jonathan represented Canada in the 2008 and 2012 Paralympics in the sprint events.
