= He Chengen =

Chinese Paralympic athlete

Medal record

Track and field (T36)

Representing China

Paralympic Games
Bronze medal – third place	2004 Athens	1500m - T36
Silver medal – second place	2008 Beijing	800m - T36

He Chengen (何称恩; born 7 July 1977) is a Paralympian athlete from China competing mainly in category T36 middle-distance events.

He is from Daletai Village, Lufu Town (鹿阜镇大乐台村) in Shilin Yi Autonomous County, Kunming, Yunnan. At the age of 13 he was infected with encephalitis, which affected his legs, hearing, and language ability. He competed in the 2004 Summer Paralympics in the 400m, 800m, and 1500m T36 events, winning bronze in the 1500m. At the 2008 Summer Paralympics in Beijing, China, he won a silver medal in the men's 800 metres - T36 event, and finished fifth in the men's 400 metres - T36 event. He is married to Gao Xiaohong (高晓红), who lives in Dachangle Village (大昌乐村), also in Lufu Town. The couple's first son was born in 2007.
