= Anthony Hamilton (athlete) =

British Paralympic athlete (born 1969)

Personal information
- Nationality: British
- Born: 18 February 1969 (age 57) Aylesbury, Buckinghamshire, England
Medal record
Representing Great Britain
Paralympic Games
Para athletics
| Gold medal – first place | 1988 Seoul | 800m B3 |
| Gold medal – first place | 1988 Seoul | 1500m B3 |
| Bronze medal – third place | 1992 Barcelona | 1500m B3 |

Anthony Hamilton (born 18 February 1969 in Aylesbury, Buckinghamshire) is a former British Paralympic athlete who represented the United Kingdom at the 1988 and 1992 Paralympic games. He was the winner of two gold medals in the 800m and 1500m in the B3 category at the 1988 games, where he broke the world record for the fastest time over 1500m.

In 1992 in Barcelona he won the bronze in the 1500m B3. Hamilton is partially sighted and boarded at Exhall Grange School near Coventry. He was still at school when he first represented his country. Away from athletics he trained as a teacher, and has taught geography at schools around the Midlands. Hamilton was seconded to Birmingham Local Authority to support schools in an Ofsted category before becoming headmaster of George Dixon Academy for the period of 2009–2021.
