= Darren Westlake =

British Paralympic athlete

Medal record

Paralympic athletics

Representing United Kingdom

Paralympic Games
| Silver medal – second place | 2000 Sydney | 1500 metres - T12 |

Darren Westlake is a paralympic athlete from Great Britain competing mainly in category T12 1500 metre events. Darren has twice competed in the 1500m at the Paralympic games first in 2000 where he won a silver medal and then in the 2004 Summer Paralympics where he did not win a medal.

He has a dog called Ruth.

== Athletics career ==
He represented South Devon Athletic Club at a club level, as well as South West Road Runners.

In 2000, he was selected in the British team for the Paralympics, competing in the T12 1500 metres and winning a silver medal. He won the first heat, before finishing second behind the winner of the second heat in the final.

In 2001, he was selected for the International Blind Sports European Athletics Championships over the 1500 metres.

In 2003, he was selected for and competed in the International Blind Sports Association Games in Quebec, where he competed in the men's B2 1500 metres. He ran comfortably in the heats, qualifying for the final. In the final, he finished in third with 4:00.95 for bronze.

In 2004, he was selected again in the British team for the Paralympics, and competed in the T13 1500 metres. He came third in his heat, before finishing eleventh in the final.
