= Mustapha El Aouzari =

Moroccan Paralympic athlete

Medal record

Paralympic athletics

Representing Morocco

Paralympic Games
Gold medal – first place	2004 Athens	1500 metres - T11
Silver medal – second place	2004 Athens	5000 metres - T11

Mustapha El Aouzari is a paralympic athlete from Morocco competing mainly in category T11 middle and long-distance events.

In the 2004 Summer Paralympics Mustapha competed in the T12 800m and won the silver medal in the T11 5000m and gold medal in the T11 1500m.
