= Robert Matthews (athlete) =

British Paralympic runner (1961–2018)

Robert Matthews MBE
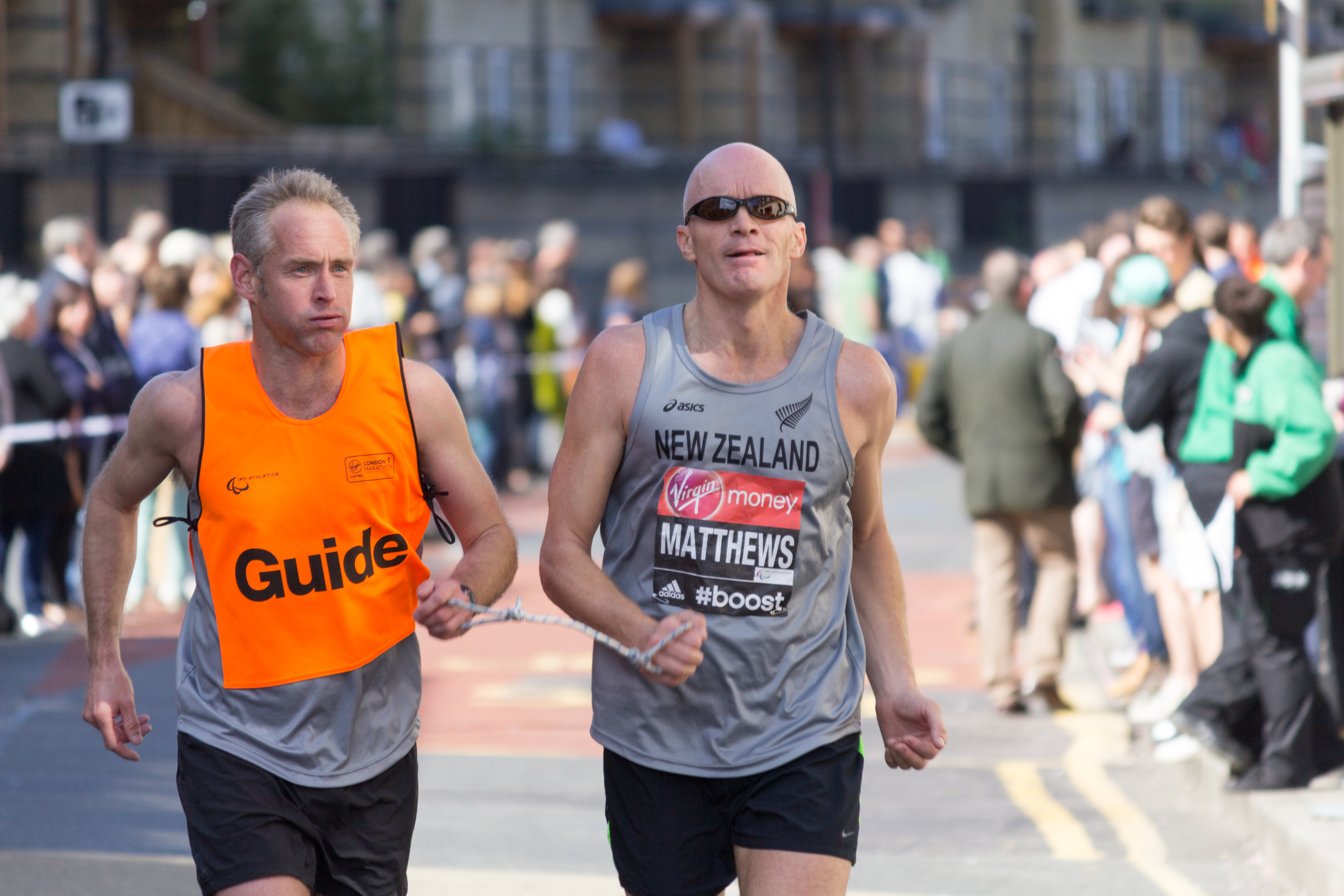
- Robert Matthews competing in the T11-T12 category of the 2014 London Marathon - IPC World Cup

Personal information
- Born: Robert Aubrey Matthews; 26 May 1961 Strood, England
- Died: 11 April 2018 (aged 56) Auckland, New Zealand

Sport
- Country: United Kingdom
- Sport: Paralympic athletics
- Disability class: B1 / T11
Medal record
Paralympic Games
Representing Great Britain
Gold medal – first place	1984 Stoke Mandeville / New York	Men's 800 m B1
Gold medal – first place	1984 Stoke Mandeville / New York	Men's 1,500 m B1
Gold medal – first place	1984 Stoke Mandeville / New York	Men's 5,000 m B1
Gold medal – first place	1988 Seoul	Men's 800 m B1
Gold medal – first place	1988 Seoul	Men's 1,500 m B1
Gold medal – first place	1988 Seoul	Men's 5,000 m B1
Gold medal – first place	1992 Barcelona	Men's 5,000 m B1
Gold medal – first place	2000 Sydney	Men's 10,000 m T11
Silver medal – second place	1992 Barcelona	Men's 800 m B1
Silver medal – second place	1996 Atlanta	Men's 1,500 m T10
Silver medal – second place	2000 Sydney	Men's 5,000 m T11
Silver medal – second place	2000 Sydney	Men's Marathon T11
Bronze medal – third place	1992 Barcelona	Men's 1,500 m B1

Robert Aubrey Matthews MBE (26 May 1961 – 11 April 2018) was a British athlete who competed in blind middle- and long-distance events. He won eight gold medals across seven Paralympic Games, and has been referred to as an "iconic athlete".

== Personal life ==
Matthews was born in Kent. He was born with the degenerative eye condition retinitis pigmentosa which he inherited from his father. Matthews started to have significant difficulties with his vision when he was 11, and by age 18 had lost most of his sight. He attended a school for the partially sighted from the age of 13, and went on to study at a college for the blind. In 1993, he moved to Leamington to work for the Guide Dogs for the Blind Association.

Matthews' first wife, Kath, died suddenly, in November 2003, aged 38. Three years later, he met the woman who would become his second wife, Sarah Kerr, while he was on a holiday in New Zealand, and soon thereafter emigrated to the country to be with her. The couple had two children.

In the 1987 Birthday Honours, Matthews became the first Paralympian to be appointed a Member of the Order of the British Empire (MBE), "for services to sport for the disabled". He was awarded honorary masters of arts degrees from Warwick University in 2001, and from Worcester University in 2006. Matthews was inducted into the BBC Midlands Hall of Fame in 2004.

Matthews was also a sports-massage therapist, and motivational speaker. His autobiography Running Blind was published in 2009. The writer of the 2014 film Blind Ambition told Matthews that it was his performance at the 1988 Paralympics that had inspired the story; Matthews helped show actor Robson Green how blind running worked, and received a small part in the film. Matthews was diagnosed with a brain tumour in 2017, and died on 11 April 2018.

== Sporting career ==
Matthews first competed at the Paralympics in 1984 at the Stoke Mandeville/New York Games. He started off in the B1 class middle- and long-distance events, winning gold in all three disciplines: the 800 m, 1,500 m, and 5,000 m. Four years later, at the Games in Seoul, he retained all three titles. He again won the 5,000 m in 1992, and finished with a silver in the 800 m and bronze in the 1,500 m. This brought his medal tally to 13, eight of which were golds.

Matthews broke 22 world records, and won six world championship and 15 European championship gold medals. In 1986, he became the first blind runner to run the 800 m in under two minutes, breaking his own world record in the process. He was listed as one of eight "iconic athletes" in the London 2012 Guide to the Paralympic Games.

Matthews retired from track and field athletics after failing to win a medal at the 2004 Games in Athens and failing to qualify for the 2008 Beijing Games despite setting a new New Zealand record for the 1,500 m event. He began to concentrate on a new sport and competed in blind cycling events at the 2012 Paralympic Games in London as a representative of New Zealand. Matthews also represented New Zealand as a triathlete from 2009.
