= Choi Yong-jin (athlete) =

South Korean Paralympic athlete

Medal record

Paralympic athletics

Representing South Korea

Paralympic Games
Gold medal – first place	2000 Sydney	1500 metres - T36
Silver medal – second place	2000 Sydney	800 metres - T36

Choi Yong-jin (최용진) is a paralympic athlete from South Korea competing mainly in category T36 track events.

Yong Jin competed in the 2000 and 2004 Summer Paralympics in the 400m, 800m and 1500m. He won two medals, a gold in the 1500m and silver in the 800m, both in the 2000 Games.
