= Philippe Couprie =

French Paralympic athlete

Medal record

Men's para athletics

Representing France

Paralympic Games
Gold medal – first place	1996 Atlanta	4x400 metre relay - T52-53
Gold medal – first place	2000 Sydney	4x400 metre relay - T54
Silver medal – second place	1988 Seoul	Marathon - A1-3A9L1-2
Bronze medal – third place	1988 Seoul	1500 metres - A1-3A9L2
Bronze medal – third place	1996 Atlanta	1500 metres - T52-53

Philippe Couprie (born 18 July 1962) is a paralympic track and field athlete from France competing mainly in category T54 wheelchair racing events.

Couprie has competed in four Paralympics, winning five medals. His first games were in Seoul in 1988 Summer Paralympics where he competed in the 400m and 5000m as well as winning bronze in the 1500m and a silver in the marathon. The 1992 Summer Paralympics proved unsuccessful as despite competing in six events ranging in distance from 400m to marathon he did not win a medal. At the 1994 Los Angeles Marathon, Couprie and fellow Australian wheelchair racer Paul Wiggins made a pact that they would finish together, thus causing the first dead heat in the history of the competition. In 1996 in Atlanta he did win medals, a bronze in the 1500m and a gold a part of the French 4 × 400 m relay team as well as competing in the 5000m, 10000m and marathon. In 2000 he helped the French defend the relay gold medal as well as competing in the 400m, 800m, 1500m and marathon.
