= Maher Bouallegue =

Tunisian Paralympic athlete

Personal information
- Native name: ماهر بوعلاق
- Born: Maher Bouallegue Tunisia

Sport
- Disability: T13
Medal record
Paralympic athletics
Representing Tunisia
Paralympic Games
Gold medal – first place	2000 Sydney	800 metres - T13
Gold medal – first place	2000 Sydney	1500 metres - T13
Gold medal – first place	2000 Sydney	5000 metres - T13
Gold medal – first place	2004 Athens	1500 metres - T13
Gold medal – first place	2004 Athens	5000 metres - T13
Gold medal – first place	2004 Athens	10000 metres - T13
Silver medal – second place	2004 Athens	800 metres - T13

Maher Bouallegue (Arabic: ماهر بوعلاق) is a retired Paralympian athlete from Tunisia competed mainly in category T13 800m to 10000m events.

He is a seven-times Paralympic medalist, is an African record holder, and trained with the Tunisian Federation of Sports for the Disabled team based at Tunis.

== Achievements ==
Maher competed in two Paralympics; firstly in the 2000 Summer Paralympics where he was undefeated in the 800m, 1500m and 5000m, taking home three gold medals.

Four years later, in the 2004 Summer Paralympics, he attempted to defend his titles and add the 10000m title. He won three golds but missed out in the 800m being beaten into the silver medal by Abel Avila of Spain.
