= Andrzej Wróbel =

Polish Paralympic athlete

Medal record

Track and field (athletics)

Representing Poland

Paralympic Games
Gold medal – first place	1992 Barcelona	800 metres - C7-8
Gold medal – first place	1996 Atlanta	1500 metres - T34-37
Gold medal – first place	2000 Sydney	1500 metres - T37
Silver medal – second place	1996 Atlanta	800 metres - T37
Bronze medal – third place	1996 Atlanta	800 metres - C7-8

Andrzej Wróbel is a paralympic athlete from Poland competing mainly in category T37 distance events.

Andrzej has competed at and medaled in three Paralympics. His first games were in Barcelona in 1992 where he competed in the 100m, 400m and long jump as well as his more usual 5000m on top of winning a bronze in the 1500m and gold in the 800m. In both the 1996 and 2000 Summer Paralympics he competed in the 800m, 1500m and 5000m improving to gold in the 1500m and winning a silver in the 800m in 1996 and defending his 1500m in Sydney in 2000.
