= Pedro Delgado (athlete) =

Spanish Paralympic athlete

Medal record

Paralympic athletics

Representing Spain

Paralympic Games
Silver medal – second place	2000 Sydney	4x400 metre relay - T13
Bronze medal – third place	1996 Atlanta	800 metres - T10
Bronze medal – third place	2000 Sydney	1500 metres - T11

Pedro Delgado is a paralympic athlete from Spain competing mainly in category T11 400m to 1500m events.

Pedro's first Paralympics was in 1996 where as well as competing in the 1500m he won a bronze medal over 800m. At his second games in 2000 he competed in the individual 400m before winning a silver as part of the Spanish 4 × 400 m relay team as well as a bronze in the 1500m. He made a final games in 2004 when competing in the 400m and 1500m but failed to add to his medal tally.
