= Sharon Hedrick =

American sportswoman (born 1956)

Personal information
- Nationality: American
- Born: Sharon Rahn; April 26, 1956 (age 70) Horsham, Pennsylvania, United States
- Education: Hatboro-Horsham High School; University of Illinois Urbana-Champaign
- Occupations: Athlete; Wheelchair basketball instructor; Dietitian
- Spouse: Brad Hedrick
- Children: 1 son

Sport
- Events: 800 meters Wheelchair, Wheelchair basketball, Swimming
Medal record
Women's athletics
Representing the United States
Olympic Games (demonstration sport)
1st	1984 Los Angeles	800m Wheelchair
1st	1988 Seoul	800m Wheelchair
Paralympic Games
Gold medal – first place	1976 Toronto	800m Wheelchair
Gold medal – first place	1980 Arnhem	60m Wheelchair
Gold medal – first place	1980 Arnhem	800m Wheelchair
Gold medal – first place	1980 Arnhem	1500m Wheelchair
Gold medal – first place	1988 Seoul	Wheelchair Basketball
Silver medal – second place	1976 Toronto	60m Wheelchair
Silver medal – second place	1976 Toronto	4 x 50m Freestyle Swimming Relay
Silver medal – second place	1980 Arnhem	4 x 60m Wheelchair Relay
Silver medal – second place	1992 Barcelona	Wheelchair Basketball
Bronze medal – third place	1980 Arnhem	Wheelchair Basketball
Wheelchair Basketball World Championship
Gold medal – first place	1990 St Etienne	Wheelchair basketball

Sharon Hedrick (née Rahn, born April 26, 1956) is an American former paralympic swimmer, wheelchair racer and wheelchair basketballer.

Hedrick was born in Horsham, Pennsylvania. At the age of nine, she was accidentally shot by a 12-year-old boy playing with a loaded gun. This left her paralyzed from the waist down.

Hedrick is the only US athlete to have won gold in both the Olympic and Paralympic Games.

Eight-time Boston Marathon winner and Paralympic athlete, Jean Driscoll, cites Hedrick as one of her sporting inspirations.

== Athletic career ==
Sharon Hedrick did not get involved in wheelchair sports until she was 19, when she was seen training her dog at a local fair and encouraged to join Temple University's athletic team.

She went on to play for the wheelchair basketball team at the University of Illinois Urbana-Champaign, winning six most valuable player awards.

In 1977 Hedrick was the first female wheelchair competitor in the Boston Marathon; she finished with a time of 3:48:51.

In 1980 Hedrick competed in the Paralympic Games for the first time as a wheelchair basketballer. The team gained the bronze medal. Hedricks did not compete in the 1984 team which failed to bring a medal home, but returned to win gold and then silver in the two subsequent games in the Seoul Olympics in 1988 and the Barcelona Olympics in 1992.

In 1984 Hedrick turned down a place on the Paralympic team to become the first wheelchair athlete in the world to win a gold track medal at an Olympic Games by breaking the world record. She finished with a time of 2:15.73. She successfully defended this title at the following games in South Korea.

1990 saw the first Women's World Wheelchair Basketball Championships in St. Etienne, France. Hedrick claimed gold as part of the winning United States team.

== Honors ==
In 1977 Hedrick won the Top Female Athlete Award at the National Wheelchair Games. In 1985 she was presented with the Southland Olympia Award, which recognizes excellence in sport and the embodiment of the 'amateur ideal'. Hedrick was the first wheelchair athlete to be presented this award. Hedrick was awarded the Jack Gerhardt Outstanding Wheelchair Athlete Award in 1988. Also in 1988 Hedrick was the recipient of the Athlete of the Year Award from USOC.

In 1989 the Women's Sports Foundation nominated Hedrick in their list of the Top 10 Women Athletes in America.

In 1991 Hedrick's alma mater, Hatboro-Horsham High School, inducted her into their Athletics Hall of Fame

In 1992 Hedrick was inducted into the Wheelchair Sports, USA Hall Of Fame.

In 1994 Hedrick became the first woman to be inducted into the National Wheelchair Basketball Association Hall of Fame.

2012 saw Hedrick becoming a member of Barack Obama's Presidential Delegation to the London Paralympic Games alongside fellow wheelchair athlete Jean Driscoll.

== Personal life ==
Hedrick is married to Dr. Brad Hedrick, a basketball coach and Director of the Division of Disability Resources and Education Services (DRES) at the University of Illinois. Hedrick was coached by her husband in the USA Women's Wheelchair Basketball team in 1988 when the team won their first gold. They have one adopted son, Nathan.

Hedrick is now retired

== Selected works ==
=== Books ===
- Introduction to Wheelchair Track & Field – with Brad Hedrick and S. Figoni (1995).
- A Guide for Wheelchair Sports Training (1988)

=== Book chapters ===
- Women's wheelchair basketball. In A Century of Women's Basketball: From Frailty to Final Four. pages 367–378. - with Brad Hedrick (1991)
