= Peter Gottwald Jr. =

American Paralympic athlete

Medal record

Paralympic athletics

Representing United States

Paralympic Games
Silver medal – second place	2008 Beijing	800m

Parapan American Games
Bronze medal – third place	2007 Rio de Janeiro	800m

Peter Gottwald Jr. is an American paralympian athlete competing mainly in category T13 middle distance events.

== Biography ==
He competed in the 2004 Summer Paralympics in Athens, Greece. There he finished fifth in the men's 800 meters - T13 event and finished eighth in the men's 1,500 meters - T13 event. He also competed at the 2008 Summer Paralympics in Beijing, China. There he won a silver medal in the men's 800 meters - T13 event, finished tenth in the men's 1,500 meters - T13 event and went out in the first round of the men's 5,000 meters - T13 event

In 2003, he graduated from California High School.

Gottwald graduated from West Chester University in Pennsylvania with a teaching degree in the field of health and physical education.
