= Tim Prendergast =

New Zealand Paralympic athlete

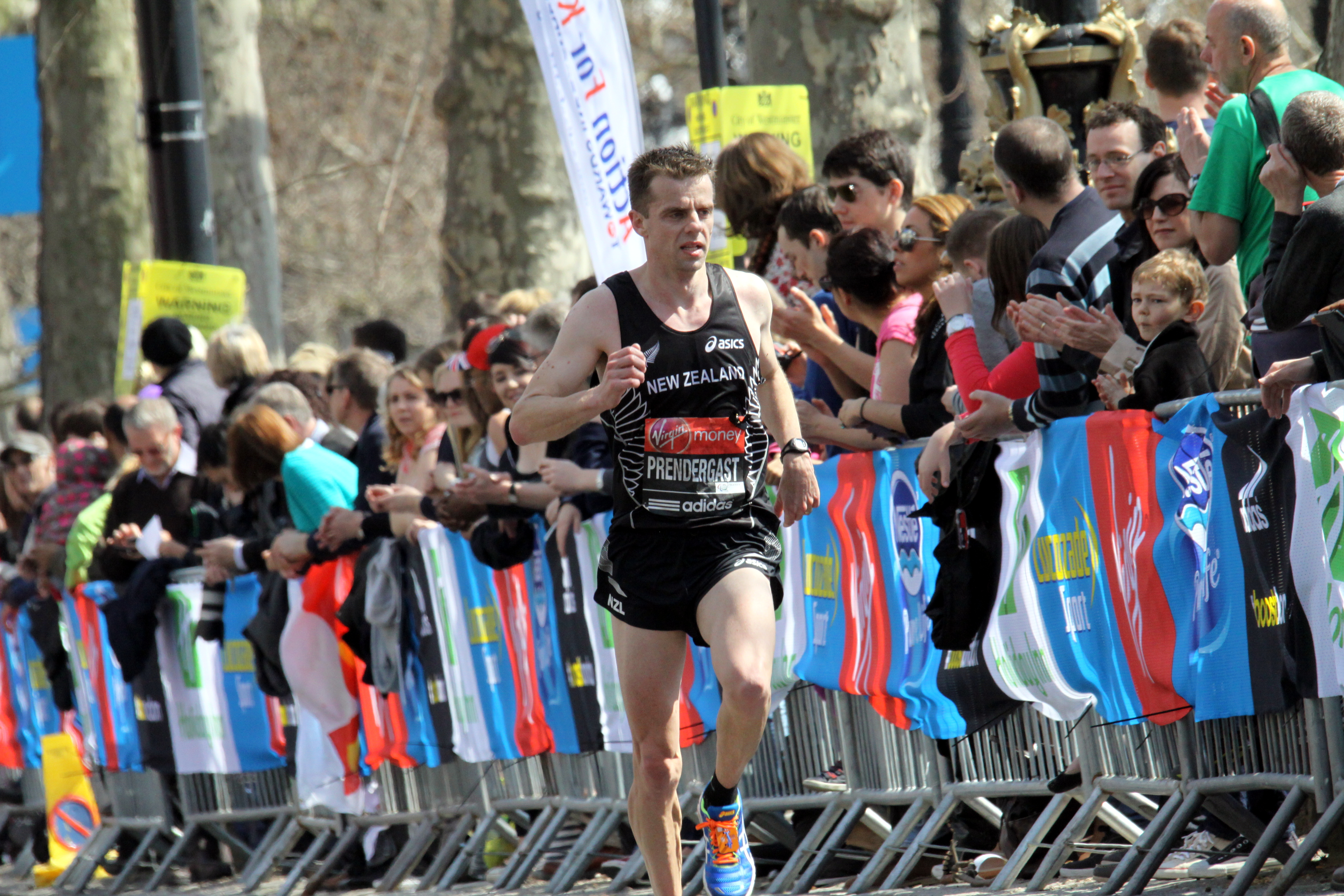
- Tim Prendergast during 2013 London Marathon

Medal record

Men's para athletics

Representing New Zealand

Paralympic Games
Gold medal – first place	2004 Athens	800 metres – T13
Silver medal – second place	2000 Sydney	800 metres – T13
Silver medal – second place	2000 Sydney	1500 metres – T13

Tim Prendergast is a Paralympian athlete from New Zealand competing mainly in category T13 middle-distance events.

== Biography ==
At eight years of age Tim Prendergast began losing his sight, and within five years his vision had depleted by over 90 per cent. Despite this and the troubles he experienced whilst he was coming to terms with his impairment.

Success was not a given, and Prendergast tried and failed in many races as a junior. In his final year at Wellington College, Prendergast received a standing ovation from the crowd at the McEvedy Shield in honour of commitment to the sport. In 2004 Prendergast represented New Zealand at his second Paralympic Games in Athens, winning a gold medal in the T13 800 metres contest. He also ran in the Beijing Games in 2008 where he was suffered from heat exhaustion and didn't win any medals. At London 2012 Prendergast ran his fastest time at a major championship but was edged out of the medals.

Now in his seventh year as an Athlete Mentor, Prendergast hopes that sharing his own experience will inspire the pupils he meets to overcome their own obstacles.

Prendergast, now as mentioned, an Athlete Mentor, visits many schools in England to share his stories of success and hardship, and continues to motivate many.

In March 2013 Tim Prendergast's wife, Lisa, gave birth to baby boy Finn. Then two years later in August 2015 Lisa gave birth to another child, Will.

In 2018 at the London Marathon, Tim was second in the T13 marathon.

Tim retired from International athletics following the 2018 London Marathon. He is still passionate about running despite being plagued by stress fractures in his lower leg.
