= Gilson Anjos =

Brazilian Paralympic athlete

Personal information
- Born: 1983 or 1984 (age 42–43) Joinville, Brazil

Sport
- Disability class: T13
Medal record
Paralympic athletics
Representing Brazil
Paralympic Games
Silver medal – second place	2004 Athens	800 metres - T13

Gilson Anjos is a paralympic athlete from Brazil competing mainly in category T13 middle-distance events.

In the 2004 Summer Paralympics Gilson competed in the 800m and 1500m winning a silver in the 800m. He also competed in the 2008 Summer Paralympics in the 400m and 1500m but missed out on medals.
