= Stuart McGregor =

Canadian Paralympic athlete

Medal record

Paralympic athletics

Representing Canada

Paralympic Games
Silver medal – second place	1996 Atlanta	1500 metres - T12
Bronze medal – third place	2000 Sydney	800 metres - T13
Bronze medal – third place	2004 Athens	800 metres - T13

Stuart McGregor is a Paralympian athlete from Canada competing mainly in category T13 400m to 1500m events.

McGregor has competed at three Paralympics, always in the 400 metres and one other event. He has never won a medal in the 400m but has always medalled in the other event, firstly the T12 1500m in 1996 winning a silver, then in 2000 a bronze in the 800m a result that he repaested in 2004.
