= Abel Ávila =

Spanish Paralympic athlete

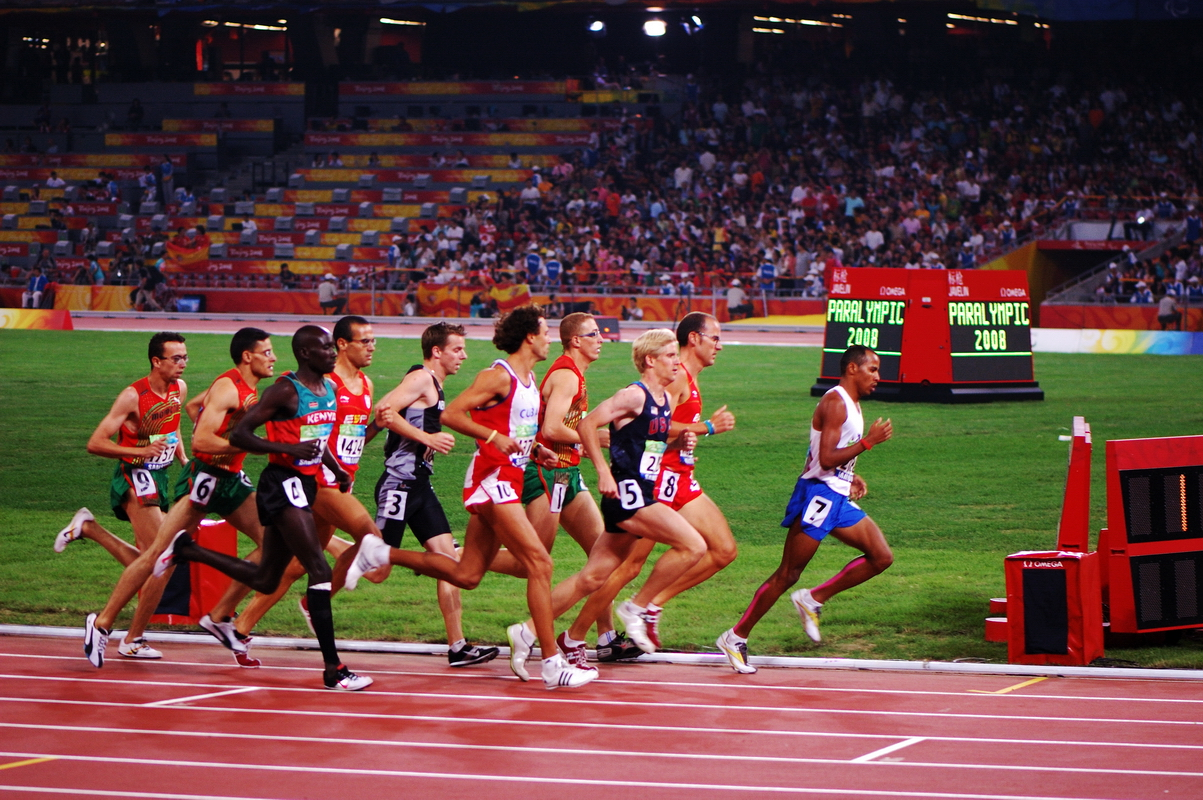
- Abel Ávila (number 2) in the men's 1500 metres T13 final at the 2008 Summer Paralympics

Personal information
- Full name: Abel Ávila Rodríguez
- Born: 15 March 1977 (age 49)

Sport
- Sport: Track and field
- Disability class: T12
Medal record
Men's para-athletics
Representing Spain
Paralympic Games
Silver medal – second place	2000 Sydney	800 metres – T12

Abel Ávila Rodríguez (Note: In this Spanish name, the first or paternal surname is Ávila and the second or maternal family name is Rodríguez.) (born 15 March 1977) is a Paralympic athlete from Spain competing mainly in category T12 middle-distance events.

== Athletics ==
Competing at the Greece hosted 2005 European Championships, he won a medal. He medaled at the 2006 World Championships. Competing at the 2009 IBSA European Championships, he won a medal. Prior to the start of the London Games, he trained with several other visually impaired Spanish track and field athletes in Logroño. From the Catalan region of Spain, he was a recipient a Plan ADO scholarship.

=== Paralympics ===
Abel has competed in three summer Paralympics, his first in 2000 proving to be his most successful winning a silver in his only event the 800m. In the two following games he competed in 800m and 1500m and in 2004 the 5000m all without any medal success.
