= Athletics at the 1992 Summer Paralympics =

Athletics at the IX Paralympic Games
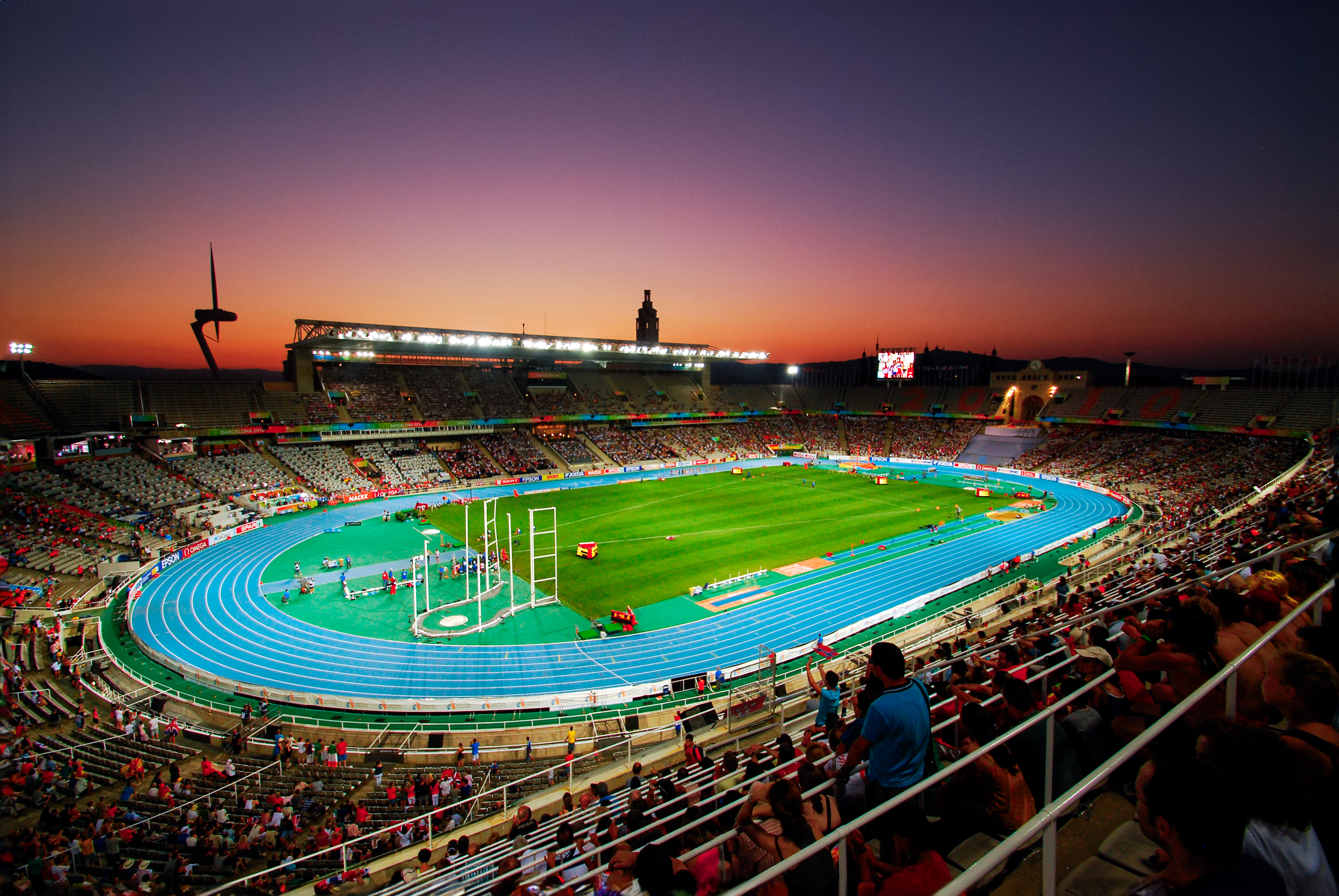
- Host stadium (shown in 2010)
- Venue: Estadi Olímpic Lluís Companys (Barcelona); Universidad Politécnica de Madrid (Madrid); Mataró
- Dates: 4 to 13 September
- Competitors: 928 from 75 nations

Athletics at the 1992 Summer Paralympics consisted of 239 events, 152 for men and 62 for women. Because of a tie in the first position of the men's 100m in class B1 and another tie also happened in the third place of the high jump event in the B2 class for men, 240 gold medals, 238 silver and 240 bronze were awarded.

Swimming, athletics and table tennis used a medical based classification system for the Barcelona Games. This happened as the Games were in a transition period with a number of other sports starting to move to a fully functional based classification system.

This medal table includes also the 1992 Paralympic Games for Persons with mental handicap, which held by the same organizing committee, and is part of same event, but in Madrid, between 15 and 22 September in the same year.

== Participating nations ==
- Algeria (2)
- Argentina (9)
- Australia (49)
- Austria (18)
- Bahrain (3)
- Belgium (18)
- Brazil (13)
- Bulgaria (5)
- Canada (47)
- China (12)
- Chinese Taipei (5)
- Colombia (3)
- Costa Rica (2)
- Croatia (1)
- Cuba (8)
- Cyprus (2)
- Czechoslovakia (14)
- Denmark (3)
- Dominican Republic (1)
- Ecuador (3)
- Egypt (9)
- Estonia (3)
- Finland (13)
- France (18)
- Germany (63)
- Great Britain (62)
- Greece (5)
- Hong Kong (6)
- Hungary (6)
- Iceland (2)
- Independent Paralympic Participants (7)
- India (9)
- Iran (14)
- Iraq (7)
- Ireland (28)
- Israel (5)
- Italy (27)
- Jamaica (3)
- Japan (20)
- Kenya (13)
- Kuwait (13)
- Latvia (2)
- Lithuania (4)
- Macau (2)
- Malaysia (5)
- Mexico (13)
- Morocco (2)
- Myanmar (1)
- Namibia (2)
- Netherlands (15)
- New Zealand (6)
- Nigeria (1)
- Norway (9)
- Oman (4)
- Pakistan (1)
- Panama (2)
- Poland (10)
- Portugal (11)
- Puerto Rico (3)
- Seychelles (2)
- Singapore (4)
- Slovenia (5)
- South Africa (8)
- South Korea (12)
- Spain (67)
- Sweden (14)
- Switzerland (19)
- Thailand (4)
- Tunisia (1)
- Unified Team (19)
- United States (122)
- Uruguay (2)
- Venezuela (3)
- Yemen (2)

== Medal summary ==
=== Medal table ===
Rank	Nation	Gold	Silver	Bronze	Total
1	United States (USA)	40	25	31	96
2	Spain (ESP)	26	15	16	57
3	Germany (GER)	20	19	24	63
4	Great Britain (GBR)	17	21	17	55
5	Canada (CAN)	16	16	16	48
6	Australia (AUS)	14	18	16	48
7	Unified Team (EUN)	11	10	7	28
8	China (CHN)	8	4	3	15
9	Switzerland (SUI)	6	12	7	25
10	France (FRA)	6	7	5	18
11	Poland (POL)	6	5	6	17
12	Uruguay (URU)	5	3	1	9
13	South Korea (KOR)	4	7	4	15
14	Sweden (SWE)	4	6	3	13
15	Denmark (DEN)	4	5	0	9
16	Egypt (EGY)	4	4	1	9
17	Brazil (BRA)	4	3	2	9
18	Czechoslovakia (TCH)	4	2	5	11
19	Portugal (POR)	3	4	4	11
20	Netherlands (NED)	3	3	3	9
20	Romania (ROU)	3	3	3	9
22	Cuba (CUB)	3	2	3	8
23	South Africa (RSA)	3	1	3	7
24	Kenya (KEN)	3	1	2	6
25	Dominican Republic (DOM)	2	5	1	8
26	Austria (AUT)	2	3	6	11
27	Belgium (BEL)	2	3	1	6
28	Italy (ITA)	2	2	6	10
29	Finland (FIN)	2	2	5	9
30	Japan (JPN)	2	1	6	9
31	Slovenia (SLO)	2	0	1	3
32	Nigeria (NGR)	2	0	0	2
33	Kuwait (KUW)	1	3	0	4
34	Bulgaria (BUL)	1	2	0	3
34	Panama (PAN)	1	2	0	3
36	Argentina (ARG)	1	1	0	2
36	Independent Paralympic Participants (IPP)	1	1	0	2
38	Chile (CHI)	1	0	0	1
38	New Zealand (NZL)	1	0	0	1
40	Lithuania (LTU)	0	4	3	7
41	Norway (NOR)	0	2	4	6
42	Greece (GRE)	0	2	1	3
42	Iran (IRN)	0	2	1	3
42	Ireland (IRL)	0	2	1	3
45	Mexico (MEX)	0	1	8	9
46	Jamaica (JAM)	0	1	2	3
47	Hong Kong (HKG)	0	1	1	2
48	Estonia (EST)	0	1	0	1
48	Tunisia (TUN)	0	1	0	1
50	Iceland (ISL)	0	0	2	2
51	Bahrain (BRN)	0	0	1	1
51	Croatia (CRO)	0	0	1	1
51	Ecuador (ECU)	0	0	1	1
51	Hungary (HUN)	0	0	1	1
51	Iraq (IRQ)	0	0	1	1
51	Malaysia (MAS)	0	0	1	1
51	Thailand (THA)	0	0	1	1
51	Venezuela (VEN)	0	0	1	1
Totals (58 entries)		240	238	239	717

=== Men's events ===
Event	Gold	Silver	Bronze
100 m B1	Sergei Sevastianov; Unified Team		José Manuel Rodríguez; Spain
100 m B1	Júlio Requena; Spain		José Manuel Rodríguez; Spain
100 m B2	Marcelino Paz; Spain	Omar Turro; Cuba	Miroslaw Pych; Poland
100 m B3	Aldo Manganaro; Italy	Uwe Mehlmann; Germany	Enrique Cepeda; Cuba
100 m C3–4	David Larson; United States	Ross Davis; United States	Joe Zuppanic; Canada
100 m C5	Larry Banks; United States	Paul Hughes; Great Britain	Jaime Romaguera; Australia
100 m C6	Freeman Register; United States	Du Chun Kim; South Korea	Eric Stenback; United States
100 m C7	Peter Haber; Germany	Sung Kook Kang; South Korea	Yiu Cheung; Hong Kong
100 m C8	Frank Bruno; Canada	Shing Chung Chan; Hong Kong	Thomas Dietz; United States
100 m TS1	Joe Gaetani; United States	Lukas Christen; Switzerland	Gunther Belitz; Germany
100 m TS2	Tony Volpentest; United States	Dennis Oehler; United States	Neil Fuller; Australia
100 m TS4	Ajibola Adeoye; Nigeria	Nigel Coultas; Great Britain	Geir Sverrisson; Iceland
100 m TW1	Bart Dodson; United States	Hans Lubbering; Germany	Giuseppe Forni; Switzerland
100 m TW2	Paul Nitz; United States	Andre Beaudoin; Canada	Bradley Ramage; United States
100 m TW3	Andrew Hodge; Great Britain	John Lindsay; Australia	Chris Hallam; Great Britain
100 m TW4	Claude Issorat; France	Hakan Ericsson; Sweden	Robert Figl; Germany
200 m B1	Carlos Conceição; Portugal	Julio Requena; Spain	Darren Collins; Australia
200 m B2	Marcelino Paz; Spain	Ingo Geffers; Germany	Omar Turro; Cuba
200 m B3	Uwe Mehlmann; Germany	Aldo Manganaro; Italy	Brian Pegram; United States
200 m C3–4	David Larson; United States	Ross Davis; United States	Christopher Ridgway; United States
200 m C5–6	Du Chun Kim; South Korea	Eric Stenback; United States	Freeman Register; United States
200 m C7	Peter Haber; Germany	Sung Kook Kang; South Korea	Haukur Gunnarsson; Iceland
200 m C8	Frank Bruno; Canada	Hoon Son; South Korea	José Manuel González; Spain
200 m TS1	Joe Gaetani; United States	Lukas Christen; Switzerland	Todd Schaffhauser; United States
200 m TS2	Tony Volpentest; United States	Neil Fuller; Australia	Dennis Oehler; United States
200 m TS3	Jerzy Szlezak; Poland	Pieter Badenhorst; South Africa	Jarosław Wisniewski; Poland
200 m TS4	Ajibola Adeoye; Nigeria	Nigel Coultas; Great Britain	Neil Louw; South Africa
200 m TW1	Bart Dodson; United States	Giuseppe Forni; Switzerland	Hans Lubbering; Germany
200 m TW2	Shawn Meredith; United States	Richard Reelie; Canada	Andre Beaudoin; Canada
200 m TW3	John Lindsay; Australia	Marc Quessy; Canada	Luke Gingras; Canada
200 m TW4	Claude Issorat; France	Hakan Ericsson; Sweden	Robert Figl; Germany
400 m B1	Carlos Conceição; Portugal	Oscar Pupo; Cuba	Darren Collins; Australia
400 m B2	Omar Turro; Cuba	Jose Antonio Sanchez; Spain	Ingo Geffers; Germany
400 m B3	Oleg Chepel; Unified Team	Brian Pegram; United States	Christophe Carayon; France
400 m C3–4	David Larson; United States	Ross Davis; United States	Christopher Ridgway; United States
400 m C6	Du Chun Kim; South Korea	Michael Lagasse; United States	Eric Stenback; United States
400 m C7	Peter Haber; Germany	Sung Kook Kang; South Korea	Ahmed Hassan Mahmoud; Egypt
400 m C8	Frank Bruno; Canada	Javier Salmerón; Spain	José Manuel González; Spain
400 m TS2	Joseph LeMar; United States	Neil Fuller; Australia	Stuart Braye; Great Britain
400 m TS3	Pieter Badenhorst; South Africa	Jerzy Szlezak; Poland	Jeff Tiessen; Canada
400 m TS4	Patrice Gerges; France	Nigel Coultas; Great Britain	Neil Louw; South Africa
400 m TW1	Bart Dodson; United States	Hans Lubbering; Germany	Rainer Küschall; Switzerland
400 m TW2	Richard Reelie; Canada	Theo Duyvestijn; Netherlands	Bradley Ramage; United States
400 m TW3	Markus Pilz; Germany	Marc Quessy; Canada	John Lindsay; Australia
400 m TW4	Michael Noe; United States	Claude Issorat; France	Hakan Ericsson; Sweden
800 m B1	Oscar Pupo; Cuba	Robert Matthews; Great Britain	Paulo de Almeida Coelho; Portugal
800 m B2	Waldemar Kikolski; Poland	Jose Antonio Sanchez; Spain	Noel Thatcher; Great Britain
800 m B3	Christophe Carayon; France	Said Gomez; Panama	Sam Rickard; Australia
800 m C3–4	David Larson; United States	Ross Davis; United States	Christopher Ridgway; United States
800 m C7–8	Andrzej Wrobel; Poland	Heikki Lehikoinen; Finland	John Nethercott; Great Britain
800 m TS4	Javier Conde; Spain	Patrice Gerges; France	Sergey Silchenco; Unified Team
800 m TW1	Bart Dodson; United States	Rainer Küschall; Switzerland	Alvise de Vidi; Italy
800 m TW2	Richard Reelie; Canada	Johann Kastner; Germany	Clayton Gerein; Canada
800 m TW3	Heinz Frei; Switzerland	Jean-Marc Berset; Switzerland	Luke Gingras; Canada
800 m TW4	Scot Hollonbeck; United States	Jeff Adams; Canada	Cisco Jeter; United States
1500 m B1	Paulo de Almeida Coelho; Portugal	Terje Loevaas; Norway	Robert Matthews; Great Britain
1500 m B2	Noel Thatcher; Great Britain	Waldemar Kikolski; Poland	Jose Antonio Sanchez; Spain
1500 m B3	Christophe Carayon; France	Said Gomez; Panama	Anthony Hamilton; Great Britain
1500 m C7–8	John Nethercott; Great Britain	Heikki Lehikoinen; Finland	Andrzej Wrobel; Poland
1500 m TS4	Javier Conde; Spain	Sergey Silchenco; Unified Team	Yan Jian Wu; China
1500 m TW1	Bart Dodson; United States	Rainer Küschall; Switzerland	Giuseppe Forni; Switzerland
1500 m TW2	Theo Duyvestijn; Netherlands	Richard Reelie; Canada	Clayton Gerein; Canada
1500 m TW3–4	Michael Noe; United States	Scot Hollonbeck; United States	Marco Re Calegari; Italy
5000 m B1	Robert Matthews; Great Britain	Paulo de Almeida Coelho; Portugal	Terje Loevaas; Norway
5000 m B2	Mariano Ruiz; Spain	Waldemar Kikolski; Poland	Michel Pavon; France
5000 m B3	Said Gomez; Panama	Mark Farnell; Great Britain	Jari Gusev; Finland
5000 m C5–8	Benny Govaerts; Belgium	David Howe; Canada	Heikki Lehikoinen; Finland
5000 m TS4	Javier Conde; Spain	Yan Jian Wu; China	Angel Marin; Spain
5000 m TW1	Bart Dodson; United States	Rainer Küschall; Switzerland	Heinrich Koeberle; Germany
5000 m TW2	Clayton Gerein; Canada	Johann Kastner; Germany	Christoph Etzlstorfer; Austria
5000 m TW3–4	Heinz Frei; Switzerland	Markus Pilz; Germany	Enzo Masiello; Italy
10000 m TS4	Javier Conde; Spain	Angel Marin; Spain	Sergey Silchenco; Unified Team
10000 m TW3–4	André Viger; Canada	Heinz Frei; Switzerland	Markus Pilz; Germany
Marathon B1	Carlo Durante; Italy	Tofiri Kibuuka; Norway	Steve Brooks; Canada
Marathon B2	Stephen Brunt; Great Britain	José Ortiz; Spain	Paul Collet; France
Marathon B3	Mark Farnell; Great Britain	Anton Sluka; Czechoslovakia	Timo Pulkkinen; Finland
Marathon TW1	Heinrich Koeberle; Germany	Rainer Küschall; Switzerland	Giuseppe Forni; Switzerland
Marathon TW2	Clayton Gerein; Canada	Christoph Etzlstorfer; Austria	Greg Smith; Australia
Marathon TW3–4	Heinz Frei; Switzerland	Claude Issorat; France	Jeddie Schabort; South Africa
4 × 100 m relay B1–B3	Spain (ESP); Jorge Nunez; Marcelino Paz; Juan Antonio Prieto; Júlio Requena	Great Britain (GBR); Andrew Curtis; Robert Latham; Brinley Reynolds; Mark Whiteley	United States (USA); Andre Asbury; Brian Pegram; Chris Piper; Courtney Williams
4 × 100 m relay C5–8	United States (USA); Freeman Register; James Anderson; Gregory Taylor; Thomas Dietz	Spain (ESP); Javier Salmerón; Marcelino Saavedra; Julian Galilea; José Manuel González	Portugal (POR); Stos. Correia; Antonio Jose Silva; Jose Dias; Mario Santos
4 × 100 m relay TS2,4	Australia (AUS); Allan Butler; Neil Fuller; Karl Feifar; Rodney Nugent	United States (USA); Dennis Oehler; Dana Jaster; Joe Gaetani; Tony Volpentest	Austria (AUT); Gunther Hirnbock; Manfred Hartl; Harald Roth; Andreas Kramer
4 × 100 m relay TW1–2	United States (USA); Paul Nitz; Bart Dodson; Bradley Ramage; Shawn Meredith	Australia (AUS); Alan Dufty; Greg Smith; Fabian Blattman; Vincenzo Vallelonga	Switzerland (SUI); Peter Schmid; Giuseppe Forni; Daniel Kamm; Franz Weber
4 × 100 m relay TW3–4	Germany (GER); Robert Figl; Winfried Sigg; Guido Mueller; Markus Pilz	Canada (CAN); Marc Quessy; James Baker; André Viger; Daniel Wesley	Switzerland (SUI); Urs Scheidegger; Guido Muller; Heinz Frei; Daniel Bogli
4 × 400 m relay B1–B3	Spain (ESP); Jose Antonio Sanchez; Sergio Sanchez; Juan Antonio Prieto; Enrique Sanchez	Great Britain (GBR); Simon Butler; Andrew Curtis; Noel Thatcher; Mark Whiteley	Italy (ITA); Vincenzo Ciacio; Claudio Costa; Sandro Filipozzi; Aldo Manganaro
4 × 400 m relay TW1–2	United States (USA); Bradley Ramage; Herbert Burns; Bart Dodson; Shawn Meredith	Switzerland (SUI); Peter Schmid; Rainer Küschall; Daniel Kamm; Franz Weber	Australia (AUS); Alan Dufty; Greg Smith; Fabian Blattman; Vincenzo Vallelonga
4 × 400 m relay TW3–4	United States (USA); Michael Noe; Cisco Jeter; Thomas Sellers; Scot Hollonbeck	Canada (CAN); Jeff Adams; Luke Gingras; André Viger; Marc Quessy	Germany (GER); Guido Mueller; Markus Pilz; Winfried Sigg; Robert Figl
High jump B2	Alejo Velez; Spain	Juan Carlos Prieto; Spain	Mohamad Khasseri Othman; Malaysia
High jump B2	Alejo Velez; Spain	Juan Carlos Prieto; Spain	Akihito Motohashi; Japan
High jump B3	Jonathan Orcutt; United States	Enest Bliey; United States	Olaf Mehlmann; Germany
High jump J1	Arnold Boldt; Canada	Hans Santschi; Switzerland	Andreas Siegl; Austria
High jump J2	Ti Zhao; China	Alessandro Kuris; Italy	Michael Hackett; Australia
High jump J4	Xue Zhao; China	Shao Yang; China	Dana Jaster; United States
Long jump B1	Mineho Ozaki; Japan	Yean Kil Jung; South Korea	Robert Latham; Great Britain
Long jump B2	Wentao Huang; China	Juan Viedma; Spain	Koichi Takada; Japan
Long jump B3	Enest Bliey; United States	Kurt van Raefelghem; Belgium	Uwe Mehlmann; Germany
Long jump C7–8	Darren Thrupp; Australia	Peter Haber; Germany	Hoon Son; South Korea
Long jump J1	Gunther Belitz; Germany	Al Mead; United States	Andreas Siegl; Austria
Long jump J2	Dennis Oehler; United States	Karl Feifar; Australia	Matthew Bulow; United States
Long jump J4	Ruben Alvarez; Spain	Georgios Toptsis; Greece	Patrice Gerges; France
Triple jump B1	José Manuel Rodríguez; Spain	Sergei Sevastianov; Unified Team	Robert Latham; Great Britain
Triple jump B2	Juan Viedma; Spain	Aleksei Lashmanov; Unified Team	Wentao Huang; China
Triple jump B3	Enrique Cepeda; Cuba	Donko Angelov; Bulgaria	Ulrich Striegel; Germany
Triple jump J3–4	Shao Yang; China	Lin Qiu; China	Ruben Alvarez; Spain
Club throw C6	Dae Kwan Kim; South Korea	Keith Gardner; Great Britain	S. da Costa Neto; Brazil
Discus throw B1	Alfonso Fidalgo; Spain	Siegmund Turteltaube; Germany	Richard Ruffalo; United States
Discus throw B2	Sergei Khodakov; Unified Team	Gueorgui Sakelarov; Bulgaria	Yolmer Urdaneta; Venezuela
Discus throw B3	Russell Short; Australia	France Gagne; Canada	Attila Pazinczar; Hungary
Discus throw C5	Willem Noorduin; Netherlands	Denton Johnson; United States	Thomas Becke; United States
Discus throw C7	Franjo Izlakar; Slovenia	Anton Scheiber; Austria	Hossein Agha-Barghchi; Iran
Discus throw THS2	Horst Beyer; Germany	John Eden; Australia	Roberto Simonazzi; Germany
Discus throw THS3	Urs Kolly; Switzerland	Said Afifi; Egypt	Ahmed E. Khalaf; Iraq
Discus throw THS4	Jerzy Dabrowski; Poland	Harald Roth; Austria	Dusan Leipert; Czechoslovakia
Discus throw THW2–3	Heinz Jakob; Switzerland	Gabriel Diaz de Leon; United States	Khaled Al Saqer; Bahrain
Discus throw THW4	Leon Labuschagne; South Africa	Bruce Wallrodt; Australia	Hubertus Brauner; Germany
Discus throw THW5	Jacques Martin; Canada	Terence Hopkins; Great Britain	Arnold Astrada; United States
Discus throw THW6	Ahmed Elsayed; Egypt	Terry Giddy; Australia	Kevan Baker; Great Britain
Discus throw THW7	Hany Mohamed; Egypt	Mohamed Abdulla Mohamed; Egypt	Maurizio Nalin; Italy
Javelin throw B1	Jorge Mendoza; Spain	Richard Ruffalo; United States	Mineho Ozaki; Japan
Javelin throw B2	Siegmund Hegeholz; Germany	Sergei Khodakov; Unified Team	Andrzej Godlewski; Poland
Javelin throw B3	Haruo Takeuchi; Japan	Jason Delesalle; Canada	Russell Short; Australia
Javelin throw C5	Paul Williams; Great Britain	Shane Grenfell; Great Britain	Thomas Becke; United States
Javelin throw C6	Yuon Bong Choi; South Korea	Fahed Al-Mutairi; Kuwait	Dae Kwan Kim; South Korea
Javelin throw C7	Antti Makinen; Finland	Do Hyung Han; South Korea	Ken Churchill; Great Britain
Javelin throw THS2	Ahmed Mohamed; Egypt	Joerg Frischmann; Germany	Hubert Burschgens; Germany
Javelin throw THS3	Chang Ting Sun; China	Tony Head; Australia	Dirk Mimberg; Germany
Javelin throw THS4	Harald Roth; Austria	Jerzy Dabrowski; Poland	Boochit Aungkulanavin; Thailand
Javelin throw THW2	Horacio Bascioni; Argentina	Douglas Heir; United States	Hal Merrill; Canada
Javelin throw THW3	Gabriel Diaz de Leon; United States	Christos Agourakis; Greece	Vladimir Potapenko; Unified Team
Javelin throw THW4	Bruce Wallrodt; Australia	Avaz Azmoudeh; Iran	Stefan Bogdan; Czechoslovakia
Javelin throw THW5	Mikael Saleva; Finland	Jacques Martin; Canada	Gustavo Ariosa; Cuba
Javelin throw THW6	Derrick Hyman; South Africa	Ian Hayden; Great Britain	Jefferson Davis; Jamaica
Javelin throw THW7	Aly Mohamed; Kuwait	Mohamed Said; Egypt	David Plowright; Great Britain
Shot put B1	Alfonso Fidalgo; Spain	Andres Martinez; Spain	James Mastro; United States
Shot put B2	Gueorgui Sakelarov; Bulgaria	Sergei Khodakov; Unified Team	Karl Mayr; Austria
Shot put B3	Russell Short; Australia	Jonathan Ward; Great Britain	Jorma Laitinen; Finland
Shot put C3–4	Michael Walker; Great Britain	Antoine Delaune; France	Eric Owens; United States
Shot put C5	Willem Noorduin; Netherlands	Thomas Becke; United States	Denton Johnson; United States
Shot put C6	Alex Hermans; Belgium	Hossein Agha-Barghchi; Iran	Dae Kwan Kim; South Korea
Shot put C7	Franjo Izlakar; Slovenia	Rick Gronman; Canada	Anton Scheiber; Austria
Shot put THS2	Joerg Frischmann; Germany	Detlef Eckert; Germany	Victor Khilmonchik; Unified Team
Shot put THS3	Zhen Yu Yao; China	Jim McElhiney; United States	Dirk Mimberg; Germany
Shot put THS4	Jerzy Dabrowski; Poland	Aymen Ibrahim; Egypt	Max Bergbauer; Germany
Shot put THW2	Douglas Heir; United States	Horacio Bascioni; Argentina	Hal Merrill; Canada
Shot put THW3	Heinz Jakob; Switzerland	Vladimir Potapenko; Unified Team	Christos Agourakis; Greece
Shot put THW4	Luiz Pereira; Brazil	Bruce Wallrodt; Australia	Hubertus Brauner; Germany
Shot put THW5	Terence Hopkins; Great Britain	Arnold Astrada; United States	Jacques Martin; Canada
Shot put THW6	Terry Pickinpaugh; United States	Ian Hayden; Great Britain	Terry Giddy; Australia
Shot put THW7	Hany Mohamed; Egypt	Aly Mohamed; Kuwait	Ernest Guild; Great Britain
Pentathlon B1	Sergei Sevastianov; Unified Team	Vytautas Girnius; Lithuania	Jorge Mendoza; Spain
Pentathlon B2	Miroslaw Pych; Poland	Juan Antonio Prieto; Spain	Frantisek Godri; Czechoslovakia
Pentathlon PS3	Roberto Simonazzi; Germany	Kerrod McGregor; Australia	Detlef Eckert; Germany
Pentathlon PS4	Manfred Hartl; Austria	Dennis Oehler; United States	Thomas Bourgeois; United States
Pentathlon PW3–4	Vojtěch Vašíček; Czechoslovakia	Jose Abal; Spain	Kevin Saunders; United States

=== Women's events ===
Event	Gold	Silver	Bronze
100 m B1	Purificacion Santamarta; Spain	Purificacion Ortiz; Spain	Tracey Hinton; Great Britain
100 m B2	Ádria Santos; Brazil	Rima Batalova; Unified Team	Beatriz Mendoza; Spain
100 m B3	Marla Runyan; United States	Olga Churkina; Unified Team	Sharon Bolton; Great Britain
100 m C5–6	Caroline Innes; Great Britain	Cornelia Teubner; Germany	Myung Ja Kim; South Korea
100 m C7–8	Alison Quinn; Australia	Esther Cruice; Great Britain	Maki Okada; Japan
100 m TS4	Jessica Sachse; Germany	Annely Ojastu; Estonia	Irina Leontiouk; Unified Team
100 m TW2	Cristeen Smith; New Zealand	Florence Gossiaux; France	Leticia Torres; Mexico
100 m TW3	Tanni Grey; Great Britain	Ingrid Lauridsen; Denmark	Colette Bourgonje; Canada
100 m TW4	Louise Sauvage; Australia	Monica Wetterstrom; Sweden	Daniela Jutzeler; Switzerland
200 m B1	Purificacion Santamarta; Spain	Tracey Hinton; Great Britain	Purificacion Ortiz; Spain
200 m B2	Rima Batalova; Unified Team	Marsha Green; Australia	Beatriz Mendoza; Spain
200 m B3	Marla Runyan; United States	Olga Churkina; Unified Team	Sharon Bolton; Great Britain
200 m C7–8	Alison Quinn; Australia	Esther Cruice; Great Britain	Maki Okada; Japan
200 m TS4	Jessica Sachse; Germany	Lioubov Malakhova; Unified Team	Irina Leontiouk; Unified Team
200 m TW2	Jean Waters; United States	Kristine Harder; Canada	Leticia Torres; Mexico
200 m TW3	Tanni Grey; Great Britain	Ingrid Lauridsen; Denmark	Patricia Durkin; United States
200 m TW4	Louise Sauvage; Australia	Monica Wetterstrom; Sweden	Chantal Petitclerc; Canada
400 m B1	Purificacion Santamarta; Spain	Tracey Hinton; Great Britain	Sigita Kriaučiūnienė; Lithuania
400 m B2	Rima Batalova; Unified Team	Claudia Meier; Germany	Marsha Green; Australia
400 m B3	Marla Runyan; United States	Sharon Bolton; Great Britain	Olga Churkina; Unified Team
400 m C7–8	Esther Cruice; Great Britain	Maki Okada; Japan	Alma Rock; Ireland
400 m TW2	Kristine Harder; Canada	Jean Waters; United States	Leticia Torres; Mexico
400 m TW3	Tanni Grey; Great Britain	Ingrid Lauridsen; Denmark	Francesca Porcellato; Italy
400 m TW4	Louise Sauvage; Australia	Connie Hansen; Denmark	Monica Wetterstrom; Sweden
800 m B1	Purificacion Santamarta; Spain	Sigita Kriaučiūnienė; Lithuania	Pavla Valnickova; Czechoslovakia
800 m B2	Rima Batalova; Unified Team	Claudia Meier; Germany	Pamela McGonigle; United States
800 m TW2	Kristine Harder; Canada	Leticia Torres; Mexico	Florence Gossiaux; France
800 m TW3	Tanni Grey; Great Britain	Ingrid Lauridsen; Denmark	Colette Bourgonje; Canada
800 m TW4	Connie Hansen; Denmark	Louise Sauvage; Australia	Chantal Petitclerc; Canada
1500 m B1	Pavla Valnickova; Czechoslovakia	Sigita Kriaučiūnienė; Lithuania	Mayte Espinosa; Spain
1500 m B2	Rima Batalova; Unified Team	Claudia Meier; Germany	Pamela McGonigle; United States
1500 m TW3–4	Connie Hansen; Denmark	Monica Wetterstrom; Sweden	Jennette Jansen; Netherlands
3000 m B1	Pavla Valnickova; Czechoslovakia	Sigita Kriaučiūnienė; Lithuania	Gaudelia Diaz; Mexico
3000 m B2	Pamela McGonigle; United States	Claudia Meier; Germany	Danute Smidek; Lithuania
5000 m TW3–4	Lily Anggreny; Germany	Jennette Jansen; Netherlands	Barbara Maier; Germany
10000 m TW3–4	Connie Hansen; Denmark	Lily Anggreny; Germany	Ann Cody; United States
Marathon TW3–4	Connie Hansen; Denmark	Jennette Jansen; Netherlands	Lily Anggreny; Germany
4 × 100 m relay TW3–4	United States (USA); Candace Cable; Jean Driscoll; Ann Cody; Carol Hetherington	Great Britain (GBR); Tanni Grey; Yvonne Holloway; Rosemary Hill; Tracy Lewis	Mexico (MEX); Dora Garcia; Juana Soto; Araceli Castro; Rosa Vera
Long jump B1	Purificacion Ortiz; Spain	Anette Burger; Germany	Kerstin Gaedicke; Germany
Long jump B2	Raisa Zhuravleva; Unified Team	Magdalena Amo; Spain	Ana Lopez; Spain
Long jump B3	Marla Runyan; United States	Jihong Zhao; China	Pavla Zemanova; Czechoslovakia
Discus throw B1	Ljiljana Ljubisic; Canada	Martina Willing; Germany	Pei Zheng; China
Discus throw B2	Nada Vuksanovic; Independent Paralympic Participants	Jodi Willis; Australia	Mona Ullmann; Norway
Discus throw B3	Tamara Sivakova; Unified Team	Bridie Lynch; Ireland	Ilona Thomas; Germany
Discus throw C5–8	Joanne Bouw; Canada	Ann-Gael de Saint; Belgium	Renate Kuin; Netherlands
Discus throw THS2	Yu Kun Liu; China	Madeleine Deouwi; France	Araceli Castro; Mexico
Discus throw THW4	Miloslava Behalova; Czechoslovakia	Adelah Al-Roumi; Kuwait	Jackie Wulftange; United States
Discus throw THW5	Marianne Buggenhagen; Germany	Vera Jiraskova; Czechoslovakia	Laura Schwanger; United States
Discus throw THW7	Suely Guimarães; Brazil	Kathryne Lynne Carlton; United States	Sylvia Grant; Jamaica
Javelin throw B1–3	Martina Willing; Germany	Jenny Bergstrom; Sweden	Mona Ullmann; Norway
Javelin throw C5–8	Joanne Bouw; Canada	Renata Chilewska; Poland	Ann-Gael de Saint; Belgium
Javelin throw THS2	Donna Smith; Australia	Madeleine Deouwi; France	Araceli Castro; Mexico
Javelin throw THW5	Marianne Buggenhagen; Germany	Laura Schwanger; United States	Milka Milinkovic; Croatia
Javelin throw THW7	Mary Nakhumicha; Kenya	Sylvia Grant; Jamaica	Rose Atieno Olang; Kenya
Shot put B1	Pei Zheng; China	Ljiljana Ljubisic; Canada	Martina Willing; Germany
Shot put B2	Jodi Willis; Australia	Nada Vuksanovic; Independent Paralympic Participants	Mona Ullmann; Norway
Shot put C5–8	Joanne Bouw; Canada	Ann-Gael de Saint; Belgium	Renate Kuin; Netherlands
Shot put THS2	Madeleine Deouwi; France	Donna Smith; Australia	Consuelo Rodríguez; Mexico
Shot put THW5	Marianne Buggenhagen; Germany	Laura Schwanger; United States	Dragica Lapornik; Slovenia
Shot put THW7	Kathryne Lynne Carlton; United States	Eva Burgunder; Switzerland	Ethel Elaine Ord; Great Britain
Pentathlon B3	Raisa Zhuravleva; Unified Team	Bridie Lynch; Ireland	Barbara Kucharczyk; Poland
Pentathlon PW3–4	Marianne Buggenhagen; Germany	Laura Schwanger; United States	Malda Baumgarte; Lithuania

== Madrid Medal Summary ==
=== Men's events ===
Event	Gold		Silver		Bronze	
100 metres	Kenneth Colaine; Great Britain	11.33	Joel da Silva Filho; Brazil	11.58	José Luis Alvarez Rosa; Spain	11.62
200 metres	Kenneth Colaine; Great Britain	22.90	Cirillo Garcia; Dominican Republic	23.69	José Luis Alvarez Rosa; Spain	23.72
400 metres	Joel da Silva Filho; Brazil	51.48	Cirillo Garcia; Dominican Republic	52.74	José Luis Quintana Nyate; Spain	52.82
800 metres	Magnus Bartfors; Sweden	4:01.11	Freddy Almonte; Dominican Republic	4:05.26	Cirillo Garcia; Dominican Republic	4:05.99
1500 metres	Magnus Bartfors; Sweden	4:19.13	Paul Mitchell; Australia	4:19.63	Leonard Okal; Kenya	4:19.72
3000 metres	Leonard Okal; Kenya	9:19.94	António Mariz; Portugal	9:20.86	Jeremiah Gatua; Kenya	9:30.56
4×100 metres relay	Spain (ESP); José Luis Alvarez Rosa; Felix Liberato Bocos; Jesús Vazquez Lopez; J. Luis Quintana Nyate	45.58	Great Britain; Peter Meechan; Colin James; Barry James; Kenneth Colaine	46.45	Sweden; Magnus Bartfors; Roger Illman; Torbjörn Eriksson; Johan Isakksson	47.17
4×400 metres relay	Spain (ESP); Javier Garcia; Jesús Vazquez Lopez; Sergio Montenegro; Santiago Santaella	3:40.25	Dominican Republic (DOM); Alejandro Alcalá; Inocencio Sanchez; Freddy Almonte; Cirilo Garcia	3:41.78	Japan (JPN); Tosikatsu Takeda; Katsyuda Ohki ldetaka Momii; Toshiyuki Ishikawa	3:43.56
High jump	Fabian Sanchez; Uruguay	1.71	Wissem Bahri; Tunisia	1.69	Anton Flavel; Australia	1.69
Long jump	Johan lsakksson Sweden	6.06	Stelian Gravis; Romania	5.96	Mircea Tigleanu; Romania	5.95
Shot put	Guillermo Apablaza; Chile	10.68	Haroldo Ribeiro; Brazil	10.43	Viorel Dumitru; Romania	10.23
Discus throw	Johan lsakksson Sweden	29.10	Viorel Dumitru; Romania	27.34	Anton Flavel; Australia	27.00
Javelin	Anton Flavel; Australia	51.52	Ernesto Mori; Uruguay	43.14	Arto Hyttinen; Finland	41.90

=== Women's events ===
Event	Gold		Silver		Bronze	
100 metres	Ingrid Nuñez; Dominican Republic	13.36	Lorena Milichi; Uruguay	13.45	Linda Newell; Great Britain	13.68
200 metres	Ingrid Nuñez; Dominican Republic	27.13	Tracey Melesko; Canada	27.57	Lorena Milichi; Uruguay	27.93
400 metres	Lorena Milichi; Uruguay	1:01.15	Ingrid Nuñez; Dominican Republic	1:01.36	Tracey Melesko; Canada	1:01.60
800 metres	Nuria Fuertes; Spain	2:39.98	Antónia Alcade; Portugal	2:40.45	Lenuta Apuscasitei; Romania	2:41.88
4×100 metres relay	Uruguay (URU); Lourdes Andreanis; Yully Bautista; Monica Duarte; Lorena Milichi	54.98	Romania (ROM); Georgeta Voicu; Carmen Ghita; Valeria Ciobanu; Floare-Amelia Lingurar	56.44	Brazil (BRA); Luciângela Souza da Cruz; Beresia Souza; Esther Ramos Pereira; Erinude da Costa	57.88
4×400 metres relay	Spain (ESP); Adoración Perez; Cristina Florencio; Yolanda Gonzalez; MariMar Parada	4:36.66	Portugal (POR); Carmo Maganinho; Ana Albuquerque; Manuela Catrocho; Prazeres Santos	4:45.55	Poland (POL); Anna Fukowska; Joana Stachulska; Renata Kozanka; Iwona Wojtkowska	4:50.12
High jump	Lorena Milichi; Uruguay	1.40	Lourdes Andreanis; Uruguay	1.38	Ana Albuquerque; Portugal	1.32
Long jump	Valeria Ciobanu; Romania	4.50	Ester Ramos Pereira; Brazil	4.45	Racquel Nugent; Australia	4.33
Shot put	Piroska Szatmari; Romania	9.08	Madelyn Ehlers; Australia	8.61	Edra Sanches; Ecuador	7,87
Discus throw	Piroska Szatmari; Romania	24.98	Madelyn Ehlers; Australia	21.32	Maria Elena Maeso; Spain	20.86
Javelin	Ana Maria Ramos; Uruguay	28.52	Emili Chelagat; Kenya	24.28	Kaye Freeman; Australia	24.16
