= Canada at the 1992 Summer Paralympics =

- Flag of Canada
- IPC code: CAN
- NPC: Canadian Paralympic Committee
- Website: www.paralympic.ca

in Barcelona
- Competitors: 138
- Medals Ranked 7th: Gold 29 Silver 23 Bronze 29 Total 81

Summer Paralympics appearances (overview)
- 1968; 1972; 1976; 1980; 1984; 1988; 1992; 1996; 2000; 2004; 2008; 2012; 2016; 2020; 2024

Canada competed at the 1992 Summer Paralympics in Barcelona, Spain. 138 competitors from Canada won 75 medals including 28 gold, 21 silver and 26 bronze, finishing 6th in the medal table.

In Madrid Paralympics games Canada has 1 gold,2 silver,3 bronze medal total 6 medals in Madrid games

== Medallists ==
Medal	Name	Sport	Event
Gold	Frank Bruno	Athletics	Men's 100m C8
Gold	Frank Bruno	Athletics	Men's 200m C8
Gold	Frank Bruno	Athletics	Men's 400m C8
Gold	Richard Reelie	Athletics	Men's 400m TW2
Gold	Richard Reelie	Athletics	Men's 800m TW2
Gold	Clayton Gerein	Athletics	Men's 5000m TW2
Gold	Andre Viger	Athletics	Men's 10000m TW3-4
Gold	Clayton Gerein	Athletics	Men's marathon TW2
Gold	Arnold Boldt	Athletics	Men's high jump J1
Gold	Jacques Martin	Athletics	Men's discus throw THW5
Gold	Kristine Harder	Athletics	Women's 400m TW2
Gold	Kristine Harder	Athletics	Women's 800m TW2
Gold	Ljiljana Ljubisic	Athletics	Women's discus throw B1
Gold	Joanne Bouw	Athletics	Women's discus throw C5-8
Gold	Joanne Bouw	Athletics	Women's javelin throw C5-8
Gold	Joanne Bouw	Athletics	Women's shot put C5-8
Gold	Patrice Bonneau	Cycling	Men's road race LC2
Gold	Laszlo Decsi	Shooting	Mixed free pistol SH1-3
Gold	Michael Edgson	Swimming	Men's 100m backstroke B3
Gold	Michael Edgson	Swimming	Men's 100m butterfly B3
Gold	Michael Edgson	Swimming	Men's 200m individual medley B3
Gold	Michael Edgson	Swimming	Men's 400m individual medley B3
Gold	Joanne Mucz	Swimming	Women's 100m breaststroke SB8
Gold	Joanne Mucz	Swimming	Women's 100m butterfly S9
Gold	Joanne Mucz	Swimming	Women's 100m freestyle S9
Gold	Joanne Mucz	Swimming	Women's 200m individual medley SM9
Gold	Joanne Mucz	Swimming	Women's 400m freestyle S9
Gold	Marni Abbott; Chantal Benoit; Tracey Ferguson; Judy Goodrich; Patti Jones; Jennifer Krempien; Linda Kutrowski; Judie Millard; Kendra Ohama; Diane Rakiecki; Helene Simard; Irene Wownuk	Wheelchair basketball	Women's tournament
Silver	Andre Beaudoin	Athletics	Men's 100m TW2
Silver	Richard Reelie	Athletics	Men's 200m TW2
Silver	Marc Quessy	Athletics	Men's 200m TW3
Silver	Marc Quessy	Athletics	Men's 400m TW3
Silver	Jeff Adams	Athletics	Men's 800m TW4
Silver	Richard Reelie	Athletics	Men's 1500m TW2
Silver	David Howe	Athletics	Men's 5000m C5-8
Silver	James Baker; Marc Quessy; Andre Viger; Daniel Wesley	Athletics	Men's 4 × 100 m relay TW3-4
Silver	Jeff Adams; Luke Gingras; Marc Quessy; Andre Viger	Athletics	Men's 4 × 400 m relay TW3-4
Silver	France Gagne	Athletics	Men's discus throw B3
Silver	Jason Delesalle	Athletics	Men's javelin throw B3
Silver	Jacques Martin	Athletics	Men's javelin throw THW5
Silver	Rick Gronman	Athletics	Men's shot put C7
Silver	Kristine Harder	Athletics	Women's 200m TW2
Silver	Ljiljana Ljubisic	Athletics	Women's shot put B1
Silver	Gary Longhi	Cycling	Men's 5 km time trial bicycle CP div 3
Silver	Monique Glasgow	Cycling	Women's 5 km time trial bicycle CP div 3
Silver	Michael Edgson	Swimming	Men's 200m backstroke B3
Silver	Jeremy Gervan	Swimming	Men's 200m freestyle S6
Silver	Yvette Weicker	Swimming	Women's 50m freestyle B1
Silver	Marie Claire Ross	Swimming	Women's 100m breaststroke B3
Bronze	Joe Zuppanic	Athletics	Men's 100m C3-4
Bronze	Andre Beaudoin	Athletics	Men's 200m TW2
Bronze	Luke Gingras	Athletics	Men's 200m TW3
Bronze	Jeff Tiessen	Athletics	Men's 400m TS4
Bronze	Clayton Gerein	Athletics	Men's 800m TW2
Bronze	Luke Gingras	Athletics	Men's 800m TW3
Bronze	Clayton Gerein	Athletics	Men's 1500m TW2
Bronze	Steve Brooks	Athletics	Men's marathon B1
Bronze	Hal Merrill	Athletics	Men's javelin throw THW2
Bronze	Hal Merrill	Athletics	Men's shot put THW2
Bronze	Jacques Martin	Athletics	Men's shot put THW5
Bronze	Colette Bourgonje	Athletics	Women's 100m TW3
Bronze	Chantal Petitclerc	Athletics	Women's 200m TW4
Bronze	Colette Bourgonje	Athletics	Women's 800m TW3
Bronze	Chantal Petitclerc	Athletics	Women's 800m TW4
Bronze	Agnes Meszaros	Cycling	Women's 5 km time trial bicycle CP div 3
Bronze	Patricia Campion; Nathalie Chartrand; Anne Jarry; Teresa Lloy; Helena Rooyakkers; Eva Sager	Goalball	Women's tournament
Bronze	Pier Morten	Judo	Men's 71 kg
Bronze	Heather Kuttai	Shooting	Mixed air pistol SH1-3
Bronze	Andrew Haley	Swimming	Men's 400m freestyle S9
Bronze	Nora Bednarski	Swimming	Women's 50m butterfly S7
Bronze	Marie Claire Ross	Swimming	Women's 50m freestyle B3
Bronze	Rebeccah Bornemann	Swimming	Women's 100m freestyle S8
Bronze	Rebeccah Bornemann	Swimming	Women's 400m freestyle S8
Bronze	Nancy Irvine; Carla Qualtrough; Marie Claire Ross; Yvette Weicker	Swimming	Women's 4 × 100 m freestyle relay B1-3
Bronze	Nancy Irvine; Carla Qualtrough; Marie Claire Ross; Yvette Weicker	Swimming	Women's 4 × 100 m medley relay B1-3

== See also ==
- Canada at the Paralympics
- Canada at the 1992 Summer Olympics
