= Athletics at the 1992 Summer Paralympics – Men's 100 metres C3–4 =

Track event

Men's 100 metres C3-4 at the IX Paralympic Games
- Paralympic Athletics
- Competitors: 11 from 7 nations

Medalists
1st place, gold medalist(s)		David Larson	United States
2nd place, silver medalist(s)		Ross Davis	United States
3rd place, bronze medalist(s)		Joe Zuppanic	Canada

The Men's 100 metres C3-4 was a track event in athletics at the 1992 Summer Paralympics, for visually impaired athletes. It consisted of two semi-finals and a final.

== Results ==
=== Final ===
Place	Athlete	Time
1	David Larson (USA)	16:67
2	Ross Davis (USA)	16:96
3	Joe Zuppanic (CAN)	18:74
4	Marcus Asbury (GBR)	18:92
5	Pieter Prinsloo (RSA)	19:06
6	Christopher Ridgway (USA)	19:40
7	Juan Enriquez (ESP)	19:64
8	Jeremy Rempel (CAN)	21:42
