= Canada at the 1996 Summer Paralympics =

- Flag of Canada
- IPC code: CAN
- NPC: Canadian Paralympic Committee
- Website: www.paralympic.ca

in Atlanta
- Competitors: 133 (95 men and 38 women)
- Flag bearer: Marni Abbott
- Medals Ranked 7th: Gold 24 Silver 21 Bronze 24 Total 69

Summer Paralympics appearances (overview)
- 1968; 1972; 1976; 1980; 1984; 1988; 1992; 1996; 2000; 2004; 2008; 2012; 2016; 2020; 2024

Canada competed at the 1996 Summer Paralympics in Atlanta, United States, from August 16 to 25, 1996. 133 athletes (95 men and 38 women) competed in 15 sports. Canada won a total of 69 medals and finished in seventh on the medal table.

Wheelchair basketball player Marni Abbott was the country's flag bearer at the opening ceremony. She earned a gold medal in women's wheelchair basketball.

== Medallists ==
=== Paralympic sports ===
Medal	Name	Sport	Event
Gold	Dean Bergeron	Athletics	Men's 200m T51
Gold	Jeffrey Adams	Athletics	Men's 800m T53
Gold	Clayton Gerein	Athletics	Men's 5000m T51
Gold	Brent McMahon	Athletics	Men's marathon T51
Gold	James Shaw	Athletics	Men's discus F34/37
Gold	Jacques Martin	Athletics	Men's discus F54
Gold	James Shaw	Athletics	Men's shot put F34/37
Gold	Jason Delesalle	Athletics	Men's pentathlon P12
Gold	Chantal Petitclerc	Athletics	Women's 100m T53
Gold	Chantal Petitclerc	Athletics	Women's 200m T53
Gold	Gary Longhi	Cycling	Mixed 500m time trial bicycle CP3
Gold	Guylaine Larouche; Julie Cournoyer	Cycling	Women's 50/60k tandem open
Gold	Alexandre Cloutier; Julie Cournoyer	Cycling	Mixed 60/70k tandem open
Gold	Lance McDonald	Lawn bowls	Men's singles LB6
Gold	Tony Alexander	Swimming	Men's 50m freestyle S7
Gold	Walter Wu	Swimming	Men's 100m backstroke B3
Gold	Walter Wu	Swimming	Men's 100m butterfly B3
Gold	Walter Wu	Swimming	Men's 100m freestyle B3
Gold	Walter Wu	Swimming	Men's 200m medley B3
Gold	Walter Wu	Swimming	Men's 400m freestyle B3
Gold	Marie Claire Ross	Swimming	Women's 100m breaststroke B3
Gold	Marie Claire Ross	Swimming	Women's 200m medley B3
Gold	Rebeccah Bornemann	Swimming	Women's 400m freestyle S7
Gold	Marni Abbott; Linda Kutrowski; Lori Radke; Tracey Ferguson; Sabrina Pettinicchi; Marney Smithies; Chantal Benoit; Renee del Colle; Lisa Stevens; Kendra Ohama; Jennifer Krempien; Kelly Krywa	Wheelchair basketball	Women's team
Silver	Joseph Radmore	Athletics	Men's 100m T32
Silver	Andre Beaudoin	Athletics	Men's 100m T51
Silver	Dean Bergeron	Athletics	Men's 400m T51
Silver	Jeffrey Adams	Athletics	Men's 400m T53
Silver	Dean Bergeron	Athletics	Men's 800m T51
Silver	Stuart McGregor	Athletics	Men's 1500m T12
Silver	Dean Bergeron	Athletics	Men's 1500m T51
Silver	Clayton Gerein	Athletics	Men's marathon T51
Silver	France Gagne	Athletics	Men's javelin F12
Silver	Jacques Martin	Athletics	Men's javelin F54
Silver	Tracey Melesko	Athletics	Women's 200m MH
Silver	Chantal Petitclerc	Athletics	Women's 400m T53
Silver	Chantal Petitclerc	Athletics	Women's 800m T53
Silver	Chantal Petitclerc	Athletics	Women's 1500m T52-53
Silver	Tracey Melesko	Athletics	Women's long jump MH
Silver	Courtney Knight	Athletics	Women's discus F12
Silver	Guylaine Larouche; Julie Cournoyer	Cycling	Women's individual pursuit tandem open
Silver	Eric Houle; J. Crepault; Mario Caron; Jeff Christy; Roberto Gaunt; Dean Kozak	Goalball	Men's team
Silver	Vivian Berkeley	Lawn bowls	Women's singles LB6
Silver	Tony Alexander	Swimming	Men's 100m freestyle S7
Silver	Marie Claire Ross	Swimming	Women's 100m backstroke B3
Bronze	Dean Bergeron	Athletics	Men's 100m T51
Bronze	Andre Beaudoin	Athletics	Men's 400m T51
Bronze	Marc Quessy	Athletics	Men's 800m T52
Bronze	Clayton Gerein	Athletics	Men's 1500m T51
Bronze	Jeffrey Adams; Carl Marquis; Marc Quessy; Colin Mathieson	Athletics	Men's 4 × 400 m relay T52-53
Bronze	Jason Delesalle	Athletics	Men's discus F12
Bronze	James Shaw	Athletics	Men's javelin F34/37
Bronze	Hal Merrill	Athletics	Men's shot put F51
Bronze	Colette Bourgonje	Athletics	Women's 100m T52
Bronze	Colette Bourgonje	Athletics	Women's 200m T52
Bronze	Ljiljana Ljubisic	Athletics	Women's discus F10-11
Bronze	Ljiljana Ljubisic	Athletics	Women's shot put F10-11
Bronze	Gary Longhi	Cycling	Mixed 20k bicycle CP3
Bronze	Patrice Bonneau	Cycling	Mixed 55/65k bicycle LC2
Bronze	Guylaine Larouche; Julie Cournoyer	Cycling	Women's time trial tandem open
Bronze	Garth Harris	Swimming	Men's 50m breaststroke SB3
Bronze	Walter Wu	Swimming	Men's 50m freestyle B3
Bronze	Andrew Haley	Swimming	Men's 100m butterfly S9
Bronze	Andrew Haley	Swimming	Men's 400m freestyle S9
Bronze	Marie Claire Ross	Swimming	Women's 50m freestyle B3
Bronze	Elisabeth Walker	Swimming	Women's 100m backstroke S7
Bronze	Marie Claire Ross	Swimming	Women's 100m butterfly B3
Bronze	Marie Claire Ross	Swimming	Women's 100m freestyle B3

=== Demonstration sports ===
Canada won a silver medal in both team sailing and wheelchair rugby. These two sports were later recognised as Paralympic sports in the 2000 Summer Paralympics.

== See also ==
- Canada at the Paralympics
- Canada at the 1996 Summer Olympics
