= Athletics at the 1992 Summer Paralympics – Men's high jump J1 =

Men's high jump J1 at the IX Paralympic Games
- Paralympic Athletics
- Venue: Estadi Olímpic de Montjuïc
- Dates: September 1992
- Competitors: 11 from 8 nations

Medalists
1st place, gold medalist(s)		Arnold Boldt	Canada
2nd place, silver medalist(s)		Hans Santschi	Switzerland
3rd place, bronze medalist(s)		Andreas Siegl	Austria

The Men's high jump J1 was a field event in athletics at the 1992 Summer Paralympics, for visually impaired athletes.

== Results ==
=== Final ===
Place	Athlete	Time
1	Arnold Boldt (CAN)	1.80
2	Hans Santschi (SUI)	1.75
3	Andreas Siegl (AUT)	1.75
4	Li Jifeng (CHN)	1.75
5	Gunther Belitz (GER)	1.70
6	Detlef Eckert (GER)	1.70
7	Juergen Kern (GER)	1.65
8	Al Mead (USA)	1.65
9	Marcus Gelderblom (NED)	1.60
10	Hristo Gerganski (BUL)	1.60
11	Luis Corrales (ESP)	1.40
