= Athletics at the 1992 Summer Paralympics – Men's discus throw C7 =

Men's discus throw C7 at the IX Paralympic Games
- Paralympic Athletics
- Venue: Estadi Olímpic de Montjuïc
- Dates: September 1992
- Competitors: 13 from 11 nations

Medalists
1st place, gold medalist(s)		Franjo Izlakar	Slovenia
2nd place, silver medalist(s)		Anton Scheiber	Austria
3rd place, bronze medalist(s)		Hossein Agha-Barghchi	Iran

The Men's discus throw C7 was a field event in athletics at the 1992 Summer Paralympics, for visually impaired athletes.

== Results ==
=== Final ===
Place	Athlete	Width
1	Franjo Izlakar (SLO)	37.34
2	Anton Scheiber (AUT)	
3	Hossein Agha-Barghchi (IRN)	
4	Mirko Kuhlmey (GER)	
5	Kenny Churchill (GBR)	
6	Rick Gronman (CAN)	
7	Alex Hermans (BEL)	
8	Timo Solmari (FIN)	
9	Willie White (USA)	
10	Kim Madsen (DEN)	
11	Chen Shina (ISR)	
12	A Matthews (USA)	
13	Lothar Hesse (GER)	
