= Mexico at the 1992 Summer Paralympics =

- IPC code: MEX
- NPC: Federacion Mexicana de Deporte

in Barcelona
- Medals Ranked 50th: Gold 0 Silver 1 Bronze 10 Total 11

Summer Paralympics appearances (overview)
- 1972; 1976; 1980; 1984; 1988; 1992; 1996; 2000; 2004; 2008; 2012; 2016; 2020; 2024

Mexico sent a delegation to compete at the 1992 Summer Paralympics in Barcelona, Spain. Its athletes finished forty-sixth in the overall medal count.

== Medalists ==
Medal	Name	Sport	Event
Silver	Leticia Torres	Athletics	Women's − 800m TW2
Bronze	Araceli Castro	Athletics	Women's − discus throw THS2
Bronze	Araceli Castro	Athletics	Women's − javelin throw THS2
Bronze	Araceli Castro; Dora Elia García; Juana Soto; Rosa Vera	Athletics	Women's − 4 × 100 m relay TW3-4
Bronze	Gaudelia Díaz	Athletics	Women's − 3000m B1
Bronze	Moisés Galindo	Swimming	Men's − 100 m butterfly S8
Bronze	Moisés Galindo	Swimming	Men's − 200 m individual medley SM8
Bronze	Consuelo Rodríguez	Athletics	Women's − shot put THS2
Bronze	Leticia Torres	Athletics	Women's − 100m TW2
Bronze	Leticia Torres	Athletics	Women's − 200m TW2
Bronze	Leticia Torres	Athletics	Women's − 400m TW2

== See also ==
- 1992 Summer Paralympics
- Mexico at the 1992 Summer Olympics
