= Cuba at the 1992 Summer Paralympics =

- IPC code: CUB
- NPC: Comité Paralimpico Cubano

in Barcelona
- Competitors: 10
- Medals Ranked 34th: Gold 3 Silver 3 Bronze 3 Total 9

Summer Paralympics appearances (overview)
- 1992; 1996; 2000; 2004; 2008; 2012; 2016; 2020; 2024

Cuba competed at the 1992 Summer Paralympics in Barcelona and Madrid, Spain. The country's delegation consisted of 10 competitors in athletics, javelin, swimming, and triple jump. All 10 competitors were men and finished the Paralympics tied with Portugal ranked 29th.

== Medalists ==
Medal	Name	Sport	Event
Gold	Enrique Cepeda	Athletics	Men's Triple Jump B3
Gold	Oscar Pupo	Athletics	Men's 800 meters B1
Gold	Omar Turro	Athletics	Men's 400 meters B2
Silver	Oscar Pupo	Athletics	Men's 400 meters B1
Silver	Omar Turro	Athletics	Men's 100 meters B2
Silver	Ernesto Garrido	Swimming	Men's 50 meter freestyle S10
Bronze	Gustavo Ariosa	Athletics	Men's Javelin THW5
Bronze	Enrique Cepeda	Athletics	Men's 100 meters B3
Bronze	Omar Turro	Athletics	Men's 200 meters B2

== See also ==
- Cuba at the 1992 Summer Olympics
