= David Howe =

David Howe may refer to:

- David J. Howe (born 1961), British writer, journalist, publisher, and media historian
- David Howe (speedway rider) (born 1982), British motorcycle speedway rider
- David Howe (athlete), Paralympic athlete from Canada
