= Jaster =

Jaster is a surname. It may refer to:

- Dana Jaster, American Paralympic athlete
- Larry Jaster (born 1944), American baseball pitcher
- Lisa Jaster (born 1978), American soldier and engineer
- Natalia Jaster, American author of young adult fiction
