= Schabort =

Schabort is a surname. Notable people with the surname include:

- Jeddie Schabort, South African paralympic athlete
- Krige Schabort (born 1963), South African paralympic athlete
