= Consuelo Rodríguez =

Consuelo Rodríguez may refer to:

- Consuelo Rodríguez Píriz (1960–2021), Spanish conservative politician
- Consuelo Rodríguez (athlete), Mexican paralympian at the 1992 Summer Paralympics
- Chelo Rodríguez (died 2026), Venezuelan actress
