= Croatia at the 1996 Summer Paralympics =

- IPC code: CRO
- NPC: Croatian Paralympic Committee
- Website: www.hpo.hr

in Atlanta
- Competitors: 5 (2 men and 3 women)
- Medals: Gold 0 Silver 0 Bronze 0 Total 0

Summer Paralympics appearances (overview)
- 1992; 1996; 2000; 2004; 2008; 2012; 2016; 2020; 2024

Other related appearances
- Yugoslavia (1972–2000)

Five athletes (two men and three women) from Croatia competed at the 1996 Summer Paralympics in Atlanta, United States.

== See also ==
- Croatia at the Paralympics
- Croatia at the 1996 Summer Olympics
