= Croatia at the 2024 Summer Paralympics =

- IPC code: CRO
- NPC: Croatian Paralympic Committee
- Website: www.hpo.hr

in Paris, France August 28, 2024 – September 8, 2024
- Competitors: 22 in 6 sports
- Flag bearers: Anđela Mužinić; Dino Sinovčić
- Medals Ranked 59th: Gold 1 Silver 1 Bronze 2 Total 4

Summer Paralympics appearances (overview)
- 1992; 1996; 2000; 2004; 2008; 2012; 2016; 2020; 2024

Other related appearances
- Yugoslavia (1972–2000)

Croatia competed at the 2024 Summer Paralympics in Paris, France, from 28 August to 8 September, with 22 competitors in 6 sports, winning four medals.

== Medalists ==
Medal	Name	Sport	Event	Date
Gold	Anđela Mužinić	Table tennis	Women's individual C3	6 September
Silver	Deni Černi	Athletics	Men's shot put F33	7 September
Bronze	Luka Baković	Athletics	Men's shot put F46	4 September
Bronze	Dino Sinovčić	Swimming	Men's 100 m backstroke S6	7 September

== Competitors ==
The following is the list of number of competitors in the Games.

Sport	Men	Women	Total
Athletics	8	2	10
Boccia	1	2	3
Paratriathlon	1	0	1
Swimming	1	2	3
Table tennis	1	3	4
Taekwondo	1	0	1
Total	13	9	22

== Athletics ==
Croatian track and field athletes achieved quota places for the following events based on their results at the 2023 World Championships, 2024 World Championships, or through high performance allocation, as long as they meet the minimum entry standard (MES).

Key

- Note–Ranks given for track events are within the athlete's heat only
- Q = Qualified for the next round
- q = Qualified for the next round as a fastest loser or, in field events, by position without achieving the qualifying target
- DQ = Disqualified
- PR = Paralympic Record
- AR = Area (or continental) Record
- NR = National Record
- SB = Season's Best
- N/A = Round not applicable for the event
- Bye = Athlete not required to compete in round

Field events

Athlete	Event	Final	
Athlete	Event	Distance	Position
Miljenko Vučić	Men's shot put F11	12.33	6
Deni Černi	Men's shot put F33	12.18	2nd place, silver medalist(s)
Matija Sloup	Men's shot put F40	10.25	7
Erik Fabian Kaurin	Men's shot put F46	14.94	7
Luka Baković	Men's shot put F46	16.27	3rd place, bronze medalist(s)
Velimir Šandor	Men's shot put F52	18.03	4
Marijan Presečan	Men's shot put F53	7.05	7
Ivan Katanušić	Men's discus throw F64	54.28 SB	5
Mikela Ristoski	Women's long jump T20	5.18	10
Ivana Purkić	Women's discus throw F38	28.67	10

== Boccia ==
Croatia entered one athletes into the Paralympics games, after nominated top two individual athletes in men's individual BC4 events, through the final world ranking.

Athlete	Event	Pool matches				Quarterfinals	Semifinals	Final / BM	
Athlete	Event	Opposition Score	Opposition Score	Opposition Score	Rank	Opposition Score	Opposition Score	Opposition Score	Rank
Davor Komar	Men's individual BC4	Strehársky (SVK); W 10–1	Agache (ESP); W 18–0	Chica (COL); W 3*–3	1 Q	Larpyen (THA); W 7–2	McGuire (GBR); L 3–5	Kolinko (UKR); L 3–4	4
Dora Bašić	Women's individual BC1	Aounallah (TUN); W 19–0	Zhang (CHN); L 0–7	—N/a	2 Q	Endo (JPN); L 0–7	Did not advance		8
Anamaria Arambašić	Women's individual BC4	Morfi Metzou (GRE); L 4–5	Chica (COL); L 1–9	Aller Mayo (ESP); W 9–0	3	Did not advance			10
Davor Komar; Anamaria Arambašić	Pairs BC4	China; L 0–7	Canada; L 4–6	—N/a	3	Did not advance			11

== Paratriathlon ==
Athlete	Class	Swim	T1	Bike	T2	Run	Time	Rank
Antonio Franko	Men's PTS4	10:51	1:19	33:02	0:35	18:44	1:04:31	7

== Swimming ==
Croatia secured two quotas at the 2023 World Para Swimming Championships after finishing in the top two places in Paralympic class disciplines.

Athlete	Event	Heats		Final	
Athlete	Event	Result	Rank	Result	Rank
Dino Sinovčić	Men's 100 m backstroke S6	1:16.68	2 Q	1:15.73	3rd place, bronze medalist(s)
Emma Mečić	Women's 100 m freestyle S9	1:07.29	13	Did not advance	
Emma Mečić	Women's 400 m freestyle S9	4:53.07	4 Q	4:50.45	7
Emma Mečić	Women's 100 m backstroke S9	1:15.68	10	Did not advance	
Emma Mečić	Women's 200 m individual medley SM9	2:46.85	12	Did not advance	
Paula Novina	Women's 50 m freestyle S8	33.96	13	Did not advance	
Paula Novina	Women's 100 metre breaststroke SB8	1:30.21	13	Did not advance	
Paula Novina	Women's 200 metre individual medley SM8	2:55.74	10	Did not advance	

== Table tennis ==
Croatian entered three athletes for the Paralympic games. Anđela Mužinić qualified for the games by virtue of her gold medal results at the 2023 European Para Championships held in Sheffield, Great Britain; meanwhile, the other athletes qualified for the games through the allocations of ITTF final world ranking.

Athlete	Event	Round of 32	Round of 16	Quarterfinals	Semifinals	Final / BM	
Athlete	Event	Opposition Result	Opposition Result	Opposition Result	Opposition Result	Opposition Result	Rank
Borna Zohil	Men's individual C8	Farinyole (NGR); W 3–0	Andersson (SWE); L 2–3	Did not advance			=16
Anđela Mužinić	Women's individual C3	—N/a	Patel (IND); W 3–1	Asayut (THA); W 3–1	Xue (CHN); W 3–1	Yoon (KOR); W 3–2	1st place, gold medalist(s)
Helena Dretar Karić	Women's individual C3	—N/a	Kánová (SVK); W 3–1	Ragazzini (ITA); L 0–3	Did not advance		=8
Mirjana Lučić	Women's individual C9	—N/a	Rauen (BRA); L 0–3	Did not advance			=16
Anđela Mužinić; Helena Dretar Karić	Women's double WD10	—N/a	Jaion / Sringam (THA); W 3–2	Gu / Pan (CHN); L 1–3	Did not advance		=8
Borna Zohil; Mirjana Lučić	Mixed doubles XD17	Rau / Wolf (GER); W 3–0	Pellissier / Lina (AUS); W 3–2	Peng / Xiong (CHN); L 0–3	Did not advance		=8

== Taekwondo ==
Croatia entered one athletes to compete at the Paralympics competition. Ivan Mikulić qualified for Paris 2024, by virtue of finishing within the top six in the Paralympic rankings in men's above 80 kg class.

Athlete	Event	First round	Quarterfinals	Semifinals	Repechage	Final / BM	
Athlete	Event	Opposition Result	Opposition Result	Opposition Result	Opposition Result	Opposition Result	Rank
Ivan Mikulić	Men's +80 kg	Bye	Ramazanov (NPA); L 6–21	—N/a	Omirali (KAZ); L 8–27	Did not advance	

== See also ==
- Croatia at the 2024 Summer Olympics
- Croatia at the Paralympics
