= Kevan Baker =

British Paralympic athlete (born 1959)

Kevan Baker OBE
Personal information
- Full name: Kevan Bernard Baker
- Nationality: Great Britain
- Born: 15 July 1959 (age 67) Imtarfa, Malta
Medal record
Representing Great Britain
Paralympic Games
Athletics
Bronze medal – third place	1992 Barcelona	Men's Discus Throw THW6
Bronze medal – third place	1996 Atlanta	Men's Discus Throw F55

Kevan Bernard Baker OBE (born 15 July 1959) is a former Paralympic athlete from Great Britain competing mainly in throwing events. He won two Paralympic bronze medals in the Discus Throw and also broke the world record on 3 occasions. When he was 19, Baker became disabled after breaking his back in a road traffic accident, his car having overturned 8 times down a slope where the motorway had no crash barrier.

Baker was introduced to athletics for disabled people while rehabilitating at Pinderfields Spinal Unit, Wakefield. Baker competed in 4 Paralympic Games; 1984 (Stoke Mandeville 7th), 1988 (Seoul South Korea 4th, 1992 (Barcelona Bronze) and 1996 (Atlanta Bronze). He also won Gold on 3 occasions at International Wheelchair Games at Stoke Mandeville. In 2011, as Chairman of WheelPower, Baker was awarded the OBE in the 2011 New Year Honours, for voluntary service to Disability Sports. Baker was inducted into the WheelPower Stoke Mandeville Hall of Fame in April 2018. Baker is an accomplished public speaker and has presented on many occasions in Great Britain on a host of different topics. He has also been invited to present in many countries; New Zealand, USA, Finland, Sweden, Rep of Ireland, France, Denmark and Germany. Baker held the post of Chair of WheelPower (British Wheelchair Sports Foundation) for 20+ years and following his step-down from this role he set up the SPINE Charity (Spinal Integrated Network) that supports spinal injured people from the Yorkshire Regional Spinal Injuries Centre in Wakefield. He is also a Director of Yorkshire Disability Sport. Baker has held many senior roles throughout his life including Chairman of British Wheelchair Athletics Association (BWAA), Director of British Paralympic Association (BPA), Member of the International Paralympic Committee (IPC) - athletics Section and the International Stoke Mandeville Wheelchair Sports Foundation (ISMWSF) Athletics Section Chair.
