= 1992 Summer Paralympics medal table =

1992 Summer Paralympics medals
- Location: Barcelona and Madrid Spain

Highlights
- Most gold medals: United States (75)
- Most total medals: United States (175)
- Medalling NPCs: 62

The 1992 Summer Paralympics medal table is a list of National Paralympic Committees (NPCs) ranked by the number of gold medals won by their athletes during the 1992 Summer Paralympics, held in Barcelona and Madrid Spain, from September 3 to September 22, 1992.

== Medal table ==
https://www.paralympic.org/barcelona-1992/results/medalstandings

The ranking in this table is based on information provided by the International Paralympic Committee (IPC) and is consistent with IPC convention in its published medal tables. By default, the table is ordered by the number of gold medals the athletes from a nation have won (in this context, a "nation" is an entity represented by a National Paralympic Committee). The number of silver medals is taken into consideration next and then the number of bronze medals. If nations are still tied, equal ranking is given and they are listed alphabetically by IPC country code.

This medal table includes also the 1992 Paralympic Games for Persons with mental handicap, which held by the same organizing committee, and is part of same event, but in Madrid, between 15-22 September in the same year.

* Host nation (Spain)

Rank	Nation	Gold	Silver	Bronze	Total
1	United States (USA)	75	52	48	175
2	Germany (GER)	61	51	59	171
3	Great Britain (GBR)	42	51	46	139
4	Spain (ESP)*	39	32	49	120
5	Australia (AUS)	37	37	34	108
6	France (FRA)	36	36	35	107
7	Canada (CAN)	29	23	29	81
8	Unified Team (EUN)	19	15	16	50
9	Sweden (SWE)	16	33	19	68
10	China (CHN)	16	8	7	31
11	Netherlands (NED)	14	14	12	40
12	Norway (NOR)	13	13	7	33
13	Iceland (ISL)	13	8	18	39
14	Denmark (DEN)	12	22	12	46
15	South Korea (KOR)	11	16	18	45
16	Poland (POL)	10	13	11	34
17	Italy (ITA)	10	7	18	35
18	Romania (ROM)	10	6	7	23
19	Japan (JPN)	8	7	16	31
20	Finland (FIN)	8	6	12	26
21	Egypt (EGY)	7	6	7	20
22	Switzerland (SUI)	6	16	13	35
23	Belgium (BEL)	5	5	7	17
24	Austria (AUT)	5	4	13	22
25	Uruguay (URU)	5	4	5	14
26	New Zealand (NZL)	5	1	0	6
27	Czechoslovakia (TCH)	4	3	6	13
28	Brazil (BRA)	4	3	5	12
29	Hungary (HUN)	4	3	4	11
30	Independent Paralympic Participants (IPP)	4	3	1	8
31	South Africa (SAF)	4	1	3	8
32	Portugal (POR)	3	6	5	14
33	Hong Kong (HKG)	3	4	4	11
34	Cuba (CUB)	3	3	3	9
35	Kenya (KEN)	3	1	3	7
36	Nigeria (NGR)	3	0	0	3
37	Dominican Republic (DOM)	2	6	1	9
38	Israel (ISR)	2	4	5	11
39	Slovenia (SLO)	2	0	1	3
40	Kuwait (KUW)	1	3	1	5
41	Iran (IRI)	1	2	1	4
42	Bulgaria (BUL)	1	2	0	3
42	Panama (PAN)	1	2	0	3
44	Argentina (ARG)	1	1	0	2
45	Chile (CHI)	1	0	0	1
46	Lithuania (LTU)	0	4	3	7
47	Ireland (IRL)	0	3	4	7
48	Greece (GRE)	0	3	1	4
49	Estonia (EST)	0	2	1	3
50	Mexico (MEX)	0	1	10	11
51	Jamaica (JAM)	0	1	2	3
51	Malaysia (MAS)	0	1	2	3
53	Faroe Islands (FRO)	0	1	0	1
53	Tunisia (TUN)	0	1	0	1
55	Bahrain (BRN)	0	0	1	1
55	Chinese Taipei (TPE)	0	0	1	1
55	Croatia (CRO)	0	0	1	1
55	Ecuador (ECU)	0	0	1	1
55	Iraq (IRQ)	0	0	1	1
55	Puerto Rico (PUR)	0	0	1	1
55	Thailand (THA)	0	0	1	1
55	Venezuela (VEN)	0	0	1	1
Totals (62 entries)		559	550	592	1,701

== See also ==
- 1992 Summer Olympics medal table
- 1992 Winter Paralympics medal table
