= Dana Jaster =

American Paralympic athlete

Medal record

Track and field (athletics)

Representing United States

Paralympic Games
Silver medal – second place	1992 Barcelona	Men's 4x100 metre relay TS2,4
Bronze medal – third place	1992 Barcelona	Men's High Jump J4

Dana Jaster is a Paralympic athlete from the United States, competing mainly in the category J4 high jump and TS2,4 sprint events.

Jaster competed in the 1992 Paralympics for the United States winning two medals, including one silver and one bronze. At his first games in 1992, he placed second in the TS2,4 4x100, alongside his teammates Dennis Oehler, Joe Gaetani, and Tony Volpentest. He also placed third in the J4 high jump with an American record in class 46 with a distance of 1.75 meters.
