= Croatia at the 2016 Summer Paralympics =

- IPC code: CRO
- NPC: Croatian Paralympic Committee
- Website: www.hpo.hr

in Rio de Janeiro
- Competitors: 19 in 9 sports
- Medals Ranked 41st: Gold 2 Silver 2 Bronze 1 Total 5

Summer Paralympics appearances (overview)
- 1992; 1996; 2000; 2004; 2008; 2012; 2016; 2020; 2024

Other related appearances
- Yugoslavia (1972–2000)

Croatia competed at the 2016 Summer Paralympics in Rio de Janeiro, Brazil, from 7 September to 18 September 2016.

== Disability classifications ==
Every participant at the Paralympics has their disability grouped into one of five disability categories; amputation, the condition may be congenital or sustained through injury or illness; cerebral palsy; wheelchair athletes, there is often overlap between this and other categories; visual impairment, including blindness; Les autres, any physical disability that does not fall strictly under one of the other categories, for example dwarfism or multiple sclerosis. Each Paralympic sport then has its own classifications, dependent upon the specific physical demands of competition. Events are given a code, made of numbers and letters, describing the type of event and classification of the athletes competing. Some sports, such as athletics, divide athletes by both the category and severity of their disabilities, other sports, for example swimming, group competitors from different categories together, the only separation being based on the severity of the disability.

== Medallists ==
Medal	Name	Sport	Event	Date
Gold	Mikela Ristoski	Athletics	Women's long jump - T20	15 September
Gold	Sandra Paović	Table tennis	Women's individual – Class 6	13 September
Silver	Zoran Talić	Athletics	Men's Long Jump - T20	11 September
Silver	Anđela Mužinić; Helena Dretar Karić	Table tennis	Women's team - Class 1-3	16 September
Bronze	Velimir Šandor	Athletics	Men's discus throw F51/52	8 September

== See also ==
- Croatia at the 2016 Summer Olympics
