= Javier Salmerón =

Spanish Paralympic athlete (1966/1967 – 2024)

Medal record

Track and field (athletics)

Representing Spain

Paralympic Games
Silver medal – second place	1992 Barcelona	400 metres - C8
Silver medal – second place	1992 Barcelona	4x100 metre relay - C5-8
Bronze medal – third place	1988 Seoul	800 metres - C8

Javier Salmerón (1966/1967 – 6 February 2024) was a Spanish paralympic athlete who competed mainly in category C8 400 m events.

Salmerón competed in both the 1988 and 1992 Summer Paralympics as part of the Spanish athletics team. At the 1988 games he finished eighth in the 100 m but won a bronze in the 800 m. In the 1992 games he was unable to repeat this feat in the 800 m as he failed to make the final, he did however finish sixth in the 200 m, fourth in the 100 m and won a silver medal in the 400 m behind Canada's Frank Bruno who set a new world record, he was also part of the Spanish team that finished second in the 4 × 100 m behind the United States.

Salmerón died in Barcelona on 6 February 2024, at the age of 57.
