= Croatia at the 2004 Summer Paralympics =

- IPC code: CRO
- NPC: Croatian Paralympic Committee
- Website: www.hpo.hr

in Athens
- Competitors: 17 in 5 sports
- Medals Ranked 70th: Gold 0 Silver 0 Bronze 4 Total 4

Summer Paralympics appearances (overview)
- 1992; 1996; 2000; 2004; 2008; 2012; 2016; 2020; 2024

Other related appearances
- Yugoslavia (1972–2000)

Croatia competed at the 2004 Summer Paralympics in Athens. The country's delegation consisted of 17 competitors.

== Medalists ==
| Medal | Name | Sport | Event |
|---|---|---|---|
| Bronze | Mihovil Španja | Swimming | Men's 100 m backstroke S8 |
| Bronze | Mihovil Španja | Swimming | Men's 200 m individual medley SM8 |
| Bronze | Mihovil Španja | Swimming | Men's 400 m freestyle S8 |
| Bronze | Jelena Vuković | Athletics | Women's discus throw F42-46 |

== Sports ==
=== Athletics ===
Men
Track events

| Athlete | Event | Class | Heat | | Final | |
| Athlete | Event | Class | Result | Rank | Result | Rank |
|---|---|---|---|---|---|---|
| Vedran Lozanov | 5000 m | T12 | —N/a | | 16:01.38 | 9 |
| Vedran Lozanov | 10000 m | T13 | —N/a | | 34:38.54 | 12 |
| Goran Žeželj | 100 m | T12 | 11.57 | 18 | Did not advance | |
| Goran Žeželj | 200 m | T12 | 23.53 | 14 | Did not advance | |

Field events

| Athlete | Event | Class | Final | | |
| Athlete | Event | Class | Distance | Points | Position |
|---|---|---|---|---|---|
| Miroslav Matić | Discus throw | F32/51 | 8.26 | 915 | 5 |

Women
Track events

| Athlete | Event | Class | Heat | | Semi-final | | Final | |
| Athlete | Event | Class | Result | Rank | Result | Rank | Result | Rank |
|---|---|---|---|---|---|---|---|---|
| Marija Iveković | 100 m | T12 | 13.38 | 7 | 13.27 | 6 | 13.38 | 6 |
| Mirjana Ružnjak | Marathon | T54 | —N/a | | | | 3:25:22 | 15 |

Field events

| Athlete | Event | Class | Final | | |
| Athlete | Event | Class | Distance | Points | Position |
|---|---|---|---|---|---|
| Marija Iveković | Long jump | F12 | 5.31 | – | 4 |
| Marija Iveković | Shot put | F12 | 9.31 | – | 9 |
| Jelena Vuković | Discus throw | F42–46 | 23.94 | 1201 | 3rd place, bronze medalist(s) |
| Jelena Vuković | Shot put | F42–46 | 7.79 | 1040 | 7 |

=== Equestrian ===
Mixed

| Athlete | Event | Class | Final | |
| Athlete | Event | Class | Points | Position |
|---|---|---|---|---|
| Slaven Hudina | Mixed Dressage - Championship | grade I | 64.842 | 12 |
| Slaven Hudina | Mixed Dressage - Freestyle | grade I | 63.875 | 11 |
| Ivan Sršić | Mixed Dressage - Championship | grade I | 56.211 | 15 |
| Ivan Sršić | Mixed Dressage - Freestyle | grade I | 59.750 | 13 |

=== Shooting ===
Men, mixed

| Athlete | Event | Class | Qualification | | Final | |
| Athlete | Event | Class | Points | Rank | Points | Rank |
|---|---|---|---|---|---|---|
| Blaž Beljan | Men's 10 m air pistol | SH1 | 551 | 21 | Did not advance | |
| Blaž Beljan | Mixed 10 m air rifle prone | SH1 | 594 | 36 | Did not advance | |
| Blaž Beljan | Mixed 50 m free pistol | SH1 | 518 | 10 | Did not advance | |
| Damir Bošnjak | Men's 10 m air pistol | SH1 | 547 | 29 | Did not advance | |
| Damir Bošnjak | Mixed 50 m free pistol | SH1 | 523 | 8 | 612.2 | 7 |

=== Swimming ===
Men

| Athlete | Event | Class | Heat | | Final | |
| Athlete | Event | Class | Result | Rank | Result | Rank |
|---|---|---|---|---|---|---|
| Mihovil Španja | 100 m backstroke | S8 | 1:14.08 | 4 | 1:13.49 | 3rd place, bronze medalist(s) |
| Mihovil Španja | 200 m individual medley | SM8 | —N/a | | 2:39.62 | 3rd place, bronze medalist(s) |
| Mihovil Španja | 400 m freestyle | S8 | 4:58.61 | 3 | 4:48.88 | 3rd place, bronze medalist(s) |

Women

| Athlete | Event | Class | Heat | | Final | |
| Athlete | Event | Class | Result | Rank | Result | Rank |
|---|---|---|---|---|---|---|
| Nataša Sobočan | 100 m breaststroke | SB6 | 2:15.18 | 11 | Did not advance | |
| Nataša Sobočan | 400 m freestyle | SB7 | 7:00.55 | 13 | Did not advance | |
| Ana Sršen | 100 m breaststroke | SB8 | – | dq | Did not advance | |
| Ana Sršen | 400 m freestyle | S9 | 5:11.69 | 4 | 5:07.10 | 4 |

=== Table tennis ===
Men's singles

| Athlete | Event | Class | Group stage | | | Final rounds |
| Athlete | Event | Class | Opposition Result | Opposition Result | Opposition Result | Opposition Result |
|---|---|---|---|---|---|---|
| Emil Gubica | Singles | 9 | Jaroslav Cieslar; L 0–3 | Gerben Last; L 0–3 | Abbas Alimardani; L 1–3 | Did not advance |
| Ratko Kovačić | Singles | 8 | Richard Csejtey; L 0–3 | Mathieu Loicq; L 1–3 | Cheon Sik Lee; L 1–3 | Did not advance |
| Zoran Križanec | Singles | 5 | Eun Chang Jung; L 2–3 | Chih Jung Chang; L 2–3 | Selcukg Cetin; L 1–3 | Did not advance |
| Dragan Rakić | Singles | 9 | Shigekazu Tomioka; L 0–3 | Tahl Leibovitz; L 1–3 | Behnam Rahbari; L 2–3 | Did not advance |

Men's team class 9 (Gubica, Kovačić, Rakić)

| Athlete | Pld | W | L | PF | PA |
|---|---|---|---|---|---|
| Netherlands | 3 | 3 | 0 | 9 | 4 |
| Chinese Taipei | 3 | 2 | 1 | 7 | 3 |
| Croatia | 3 | 1 | 2 | 5 | 7 |
| Iran | 3 | 0 | 3 | 2 | 9 |

== See also ==
- 2004 Summer Paralympics
- Croatia at the Paralympics
- Croatia at the 2004 Summer Olympics
