= Croatia at the 2008 Summer Paralympics =

- IPC code: CRO
- NPC: Croatian Paralympic Committee
- Website: www.hpo.hr

in Beijing
- Competitors: 25
- Flag bearer: Marija Iveković
- Medals Ranked 37th: Gold 3 Silver 1 Bronze 0 Total 4

Summer Paralympics appearances (overview)
- 1992; 1996; 2000; 2004; 2008; 2012; 2016; 2020; 2024

Other related appearances
- Yugoslavia (1972–2000)

Croatia competed at the 2008 Summer Paralympics in Beijing. The country's delegation consisted of 25 competitors.

Croatian competitors took part in table tennis, athletics, equestrian, and swimming.

== Medalists ==
Medal	Name	Sport	Event	Date
Gold	Antonia Balek	Athletics	Women's javelin throw F33–34/52–53	13 September
Gold	Antonia Balek	Athletics	Women's shot put F32–34/52–53	15 September
Gold	Darko Kralj	Athletics	Men's shot put F42	10 September
Silver	Branimir Budetić	Athletics	Men's javelin throw F11–12	10 September

== Athletics ==
Men
Track events

Athlete	Event	Class	Heat		Final	
Athlete	Event	Class	Result	Rank	Result	Rank
Petar Bešlić	1500 m	T11	4:31.52	14	Did not advance	
Vedran Lozanov	5000 m	T13	16:04.03	10	15:41.36	6
Vedran Lozanov	10000 m	T12	—		35:04.76	9
Goran Žeželj	100 m	T12	11.66	17	Did not advance	

Field events

Athlete	Event	Class	Final		
Athlete	Event	Class	Distance	Points	Position
Branimir Budetić	Javelin throw	F11–12	57.11	1009	2nd place, silver medalist(s)
Branimir Budetić	Pentathlon	P12	–	3102	5
Darko Kralj	Shot put	F42	14.43 WR	–	1st place, gold medalist(s)
Miroslav Matić	Club throw	F32/51	21.48	891	8
Miroslav Matić	Discus throw	F32/51	9.43	960	10
Josip Slivar	Shot put	F44	14.67	916	5
Denis Slunjski	Shot put	F40	9.83	–	7
Mladen Tomić	Shot put	F42	12.78	–	6
Goran Žeželj	Pentathlon	P12	–	2400	11

Women
Field events

Athlete	Event	Class	Final		
Athlete	Event	Class	Distance	Points	Position
Antonia Balek	Javelin throw	F33–34/52–53	12.82	1425 WR	1st place, gold medalist(s)
Antonia Balek	Shot put	F32–34/52–53	5.69	1240 WR	1st place, gold medalist(s)
Antonia Balek	Discus throw	F32–34/51–53	13.11	883	10
Marija Iveković	Discus throw	F12–13	31.76	746	9
Marija Iveković	Long jump	F12	5.54	1003	6
Milka Milinković	Javelin throw	F54–56	14.55	819	13
Milka Milinković	Shot put	F54–56	5.84	702	15
Jelena Vuković	Discus throw	F42–46	24.90	818	7
Jelena Vuković	Shot put	F42–46	8.31	891	7

== Cycling ==
Men

Athlete	Event	Class	Final	
Athlete	Event	Class	Result	Position
Tomislav Zadro	Individual Road Race	LC1–2/CP4	2:01:44	26
Tomislav Zadro	Individual Time Trial	LC 2	39:42.59	10

== Equestrian ==
Mixed

Athlete	Event	Class	Final	
Athlete	Event	Class	Points	Position
Slaven Hudina	Mixed Dressage - Championship	grade Ia	63.700	5
Slaven Hudina	Mixed Dressage - Freestyle	grade Ia	66.889	5
Ivan Sršić	Mixed Dressage - Championship	grade Ia	61.500	6
Ivan Sršić	Mixed Dressage - Freestyle	grade Ia	65.998	6

== Shooting ==
Men, mixed

Athlete	Event	Class	Qualification		Final	
Athlete	Event	Class	Points	Rank	Points	Rank
Damir Bošnjak	Men's 10 m air pistol	SH1	562	9	Did not advance	
Damir Bošnjak	Mixed 50 m free pistol	SH1	521	12	Did not advance	
Damir Bošnjak	Mixed 25 m sport pistol	SH1	553	14	Did not advance	
Ivica Bratanović	Mixed 10 m air rifle prone	SH1	597	13	Did not advance	
Ivica Bratanović	Mixed 10 m air rifle standing	SH1	594	15	Did not advance	
Rudolf Petrović	Mixed 10 m air rifle prone	SH1	591	21	Did not advance	
Rudolf Petrović	Mixed 10 m air rifle standing	SH1	583	21	Did not advance	

== Swimming ==
Men

Athlete	Event	Class	Heat		Final	
Athlete	Event	Class	Result	Rank	Result	Rank
Mihovil Španja	100 m backstroke	S8	1:13.62	7	1:14.25	7
Mihovil Španja	100 m breaststroke	S7	1:28.82	7	1:26.35	6
Mihovil Španja	200 m individual medley	SM8	2:39.55	7	2:37.77	6
Kristijan Vincetić	100 m butterfly	S9	1:04.51	10	Did not advance	

Women

Athlete	Event	Class	Heat		Final	
Athlete	Event	Class	Result	Rank	Result	Rank
Nataša Sobočan	100 m backstroke	S7	1:46.48	10	Did not advance	
Nataša Sobočan	100 m breaststroke	SB6	2:04.88	10	Did not advance	
Nataša Sobočan	400 m freestyle	S7	6:32.66	11	Did not advance	
Ana Sršen	100 m breaststroke	SB8	1:39.28	14	Did not advance	

== Table tennis ==
Men's singles preliminaries (class 6)

Athlete	Pld	W	L	PF	PA
Daniel Arnold (GER)	3	3	0	9	2
Alexander Esaulov (RUS)	3	2	1	6	6
Vjekoslav Gregorović (CRO)	3	1	2	4	8
Chao Chen (CHN)	3	0	3	6	9

Men's singles preliminaries (class 4–5)

Athlete	Pld	W	L	PF	PA
Kyoung Sik Choi (KOR)	2	2	0	6	0
Claudiomiro Segatto (BRA)	2	1	1	3	3
Zoran Križanec (CRO)	2	0	2	0	6

== See also ==
- 2008 Summer Paralympics
- Croatia at the Paralympics
- Croatia at the 2008 Summer Olympics
