= Renate Kuin =

Dutch Paralympic athlete

Medal record

Track and field (athletics)

Representing Netherlands

Paralympic Games
Bronze medal – third place	1992 Barcelona	Shot Put - C5-8
Bronze medal – third place	1992 Barcelona	Discus Throw - C5-8

Renate Kuin (born c. 1962) is a Paralympian athlete from Netherlands competing mainly in category C5-8 shot and discus events.

Renate won the bronze medal in both the C5-8 shot and discus events at the 1992 Summer Paralympics in Atlanta.
