= Giuseppe Forni =

Swiss Paralympic athlete

Medal record

Track and field (athletics)

Representing Switzerland

Paralympic Games
Silver medal – second place	1992 Barcelona	200 metres - TW1
Bronze medal – third place	1988 Seoul	200 metres - 1A
Bronze medal – third place	1992 Barcelona	1500 metres - TW1
Bronze medal – third place	1992 Barcelona	100 metres - TW1
Bronze medal – third place	1992 Barcelona	4x100 metre relay - TW1-2
Bronze medal – third place	1992 Barcelona	Marathon - TW1-2
Bronze medal – third place	1996 Atlanta	400 metres - T50
Bronze medal – third place	2000 Sydney	1500 metres - T51

Giuseppe Forni is a paralympic athlete from Switzerland competing mainly in category T51 racing events.

Giuseepe was a fixture at four Paralympics, competing in multiple events in each games and winning medals at all four of the games however he never won a gold medal. His first games were in 1988 Summer Paralympics where he competed in every individual track event from 100m to 1500m and the 4 × 100 m winning a bronze medal in the 200m. In 1992 he extended his range from 100m to marathon and the relay but did not compete in the 200m here he gained bronze medals in the relay, 100m, 1500m and Marathon and a silver in the 200m. At his third games he competed in the Marathon, 1500m, 800m and 400m winning a bronze medal in the 400m, while at his last games in 2000 he competed in four events between 200m and 1500m winning a bronze medal in the 1500m.
