= Croatia at the 1992 Summer Paralympics =

- IPC code: CRO
- NPC: Croatian Paralympic Committee
- Website: www.hpo.hr

in Barcelona
- Competitors: 6
- Medals Ranked 55th: Gold 0 Silver 0 Bronze 1 Total 1

Summer Paralympics appearances (overview)
- 1992; 1996; 2000; 2004; 2008; 2012; 2016; 2020; 2024

Other related appearances
- Yugoslavia (1972–2000)

Croatia competed at the 1992 Summer Paralympics in Barcelona, Madrid Spain. 6 competitors from Croatia won a single bronze medal, finishing joint 50th in the medal table with 5 other countries.

== See also ==
- Croatia at the Paralympics
- Croatia at the 1992 Summer Olympics
