= Marcelino Saavedra =

Spanish Paralympic athlete

Medal record

Track and field (athletics)

Representing Spain

Paralympic Games
Silver medal – second place	1992 Barcelona	4x100 metre relay - C5-8

Marcelino Saavedra is a former paralympic athlete from Spain who competed mainly in category C5-8 4 × 100 m events.

Saavedra competed both in the 1992 Summer Paralympics in his home country and the 1996 Summer Paralympics.

In 1992, he competed in the 100m and 200m finishing fourth each time . He was also part of the silver medal-winning Spanish squad in the 4 × 100 m.

At the 1996 games he competed in the 100m and 400m finishing fourth and fifth respectively.

He was also part of the Spanish squad that failed to finished in the 4 × 100 m.
