= Slovenia at the 1992 Summer Paralympics =

- IPC code: SLO
- NPC: Sports Federation for the Disabled of Slovenia
- Website: www.zsis.si

in Barcelona
- Competitors: 8
- Medals Ranked 39th: Gold 2 Silver 0 Bronze 1 Total 3

Summer Paralympics appearances (overview)
- 1992; 1996; 2000; 2004; 2008; 2012; 2016; 2020; 2024

Other related appearances
- Yugoslavia (1972–2000)

Slovenia competed at the 1992 Summer Paralympics in Barcelona, Spain. 8 competitors from Slovenia won 3 medals including 2 gold and 1 bronze and finished 35th in the medal table.

== Medalists ==
Medal	Name	Sport	Event
Gold	Franjo Izlakar	Athletics	Men's discus throw C7
Gold	Franjo Izlakar	Athletics	Men's shot put C7
Bronze	Dragica Lapornik	Athletics	Women's shot put THW5

== See also ==
- Slovenia at the Paralympics
- Slovenia at the 1992 Summer Olympics
