= Ann-Gael de Saint =

Belgian Paralympic athlete

Medal record

Paralympic athletics

Representing Belgium

Paralympic Games
Silver medal – second place	1988 Seoul	Shot Put - C7
Silver medal – second place	1988 Seoul	Discus Throw - C7
Silver medal – second place	1992 Barcelona	Shot Put - C5-8
Silver medal – second place	1992 Barcelona	Discus Throw - C5-8
Bronze medal – third place	1992 Barcelona	Javelin Throw - C5-8

Ann-Gael de Saint is a Paralympian athlete from Belgium competing mainly in category C7 throwing events.

Ann competed in all the throws for the C7 class in both the 1988 and 1992 Summer Paralympics, winning silver in shot and discus in both games and winning a bronze on the javelin in 1992.
