= Haruo Takeuchi =

Japanese Paralympic athlete

Medal record

Paralympic athletics

Representing Japan

Paralympic Games
Gold medal – first place	1992 Barcelona	Javelin Throw - B3

Haruo Takeuchi (竹内 治夫, Takeuchi Haruo) is a paralympic athlete from Japan competing mainly in category B3 javelin events.

Haruo competed in the B3 category javelin at the 1992 Summer Paralympics winning the gold medal in a Paralympic record of 49.02 metres.
