= Kuwait at the 1992 Summer Paralympics =

- IPC code: KUW
- NPC: Kuwait Paralympic Committee

in Barcelona
- Competitors: 24
- Medals Ranked 40th: Gold 1 Silver 3 Bronze 1 Total 5

Summer Paralympics appearances (overview)
- 1980; 1984; 1988; 1992; 1996; 2000; 2004; 2008; 2012; 2016; 2020; 2024

Kuwait competed at the 1992 Summer Paralympics in Barcelona, Spain. 24 competitors from Kuwait won five medals, one gold, three silver and one bronze and finished 36th in the medal table.

== See also ==
- Kuwait at the Paralympics
- Kuwait at the 1992 Summer Olympics
