= Tunisia at the 1992 Summer Paralympics =

- IPC code: TUN
- NPC: Tunisian Paralympic Committee

in Barcelona
- Competitors: 1
- Medals Ranked 53rd: Gold 0 Silver 1 Bronze 0 Total 1

Summer Paralympics appearances (overview)
- 1988; 1992; 1996; 2000; 2004; 2008; 2012; 2016; 2020; 2024

One man athlete from Tunisia competed at the 1992 Summer Paralympics in Barcelona, Spain.

In Madrid Paralympics games Tunisia has 1 silver medal from Athletics total ranked by medal at 53rd

== Team ==
Tunisia sent one sportsperson to the Barcelona Games, athlete Kais El-Bokri.

== Athletics ==
El-Bokri competed in the Men's 100 m TS4 event. Competing in heat 2, he finished ninth in a nine deep field in a time of 13.56 seconds.

== See also ==
- Tunisia at the Paralympics
- Tunisia at the 1992 Summer Olympics
