= Derrick Hyman =

South African Paralympic athlete

Medal record

Paralympic athletics

Representing South Africa

Paralympic Games
Gold medal – first place	1992 Barcelona	Javelin - THW6

Derrick Hyman is a paralympic athlete from South Africa competing mainly in category THW6 shot and javelin events.

Derrick competed in the 1992 Summer Paralympics in the shot put and javelin, winning the javelin in a new world record but only managing seventh in the shot put.
