= André Viger =

Canadian paralympic athlete

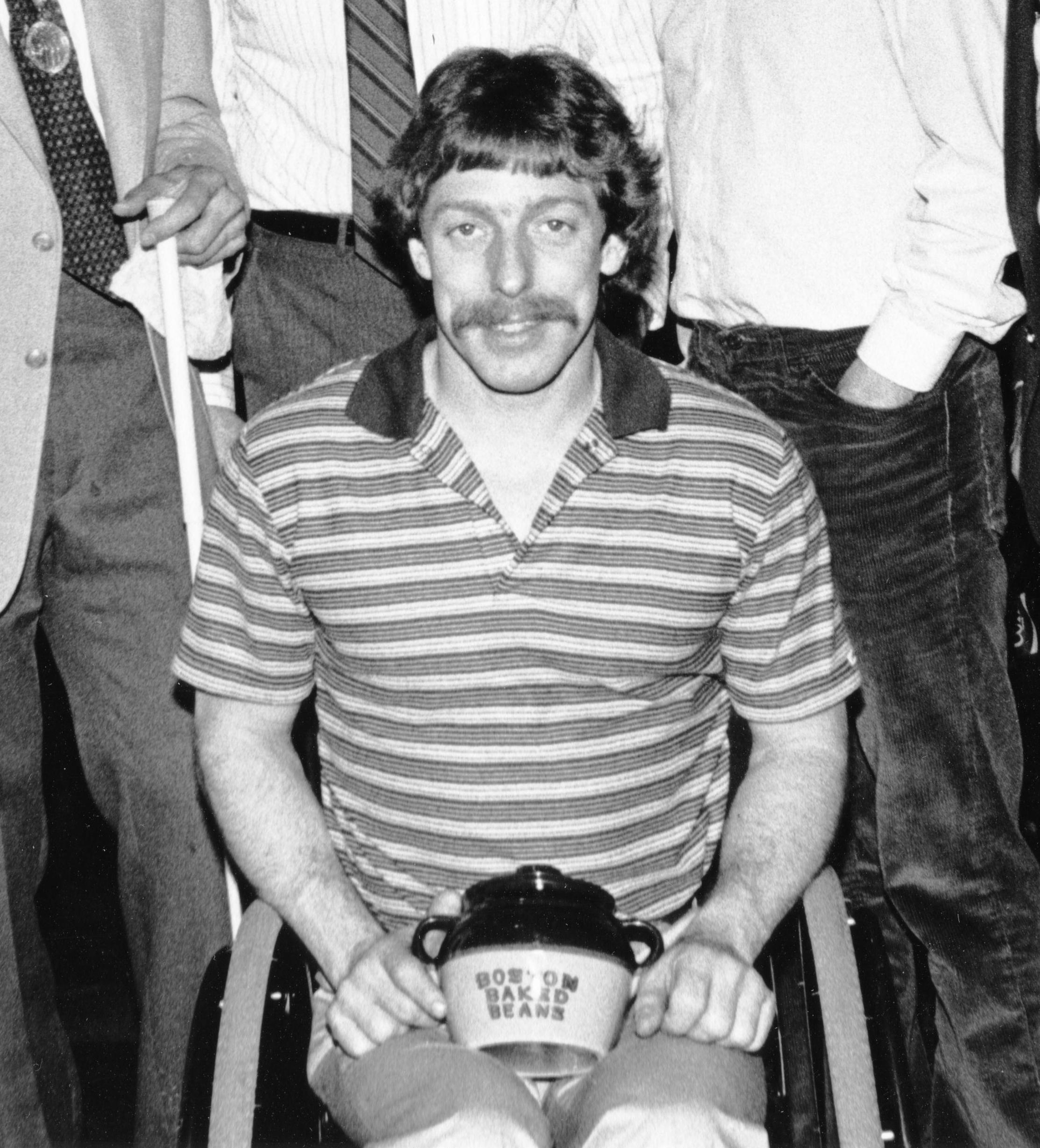
- Viger after his victory in the men's wheelchair division of the 1984 Boston Marathon

Personal information
- Born: September 27, 1952 Windsor, Ontario, Canada
- Died: October 1, 2006 (aged 54)

Sport
- Sport: Paralympic athletics
Medal record
Paralympic athletics
Representing Canada
Paralympic Games
Gold medal – first place	1984 Stoke Mandeville	Marathon 3
Gold medal – first place	1988 Seoul	Marathon 3
Gold medal – first place	1992 Barcelona	10,000m TW3-4
Silver medal – second place	1988 Seoul	10,000m 3
Silver medal – second place	1992 Barcelona	4x100m relay TW3-4
Silver medal – second place	1992 Barcelona	4x400m relay TW3-4
Bronze medal – third place	1980 Arnhem	4x100m relay 2-5
Bronze medal – third place	1984 Stoke Mandeville	1500m 3
Bronze medal – third place	1988 Seoul	800m 3
Bronze medal – third place	1988 Seoul	5000m 3

André Viger, OC CQ (September 27, 1952 – October 1, 2006) was a French Canadian wheelchair marathoner and Paralympian. He took part in five consecutive Summer Paralympic Games in athletics from 1980 to 1996, winning a total of three gold, three silver and four bronze medals.

== Biography ==
Born in Windsor, Ontario, Viger grew up in Sherbrooke, Quebec. He lost the use of his legs following a traffic accident at age 20. He won the men's wheelchair division of the Boston Marathon in 1984, 1986 and 1987. In 1987, he was made a Knight of the National Order of Quebec. In 1989, he was made an Officer of the Order of Canada for being "a source of encouragement for young athletes and a role model for young people everywhere". In 1993, he was inducted into the Terry Fox Hall of Fame, and in 2005, the Paralympic Hall of Fame.

After retiring from athletics, he began a career as a businessman and started a wheelchair manufacturing company. He died of cancer on October 1, 2006.

In 2013, Viger was inducted into Canada's Sports Hall of Fame.
