= Mayte Espinosa =

Spanish Paralympic athlete

Medal record

Paralympic athletics

Representing Spain

Paralympic Games
Bronze medal – third place	1992 Barcelona	1500 metres - B1

Mayte Espinosa is a paralympic athlete from Spain competing mainly in category B1 distance running events.

Mayte competed at the 1992, 1996 and 2000 Summer Paralympics in a variety of track distances. In 1992 she won her only medal, a bronze, in the 1500m as well as finishing fourth in the 3000m and fifth in the 800m. In 1996 she competed in the 1500m finishing fifth and the 3000m though she failed to finish. Her final games in Sydney in 2000 she failed to finish in the 400m and 1500m but did finish seventh in the 5000m.
