= Joseph LeMar =

American Paralympic athlete

Medal record

Paralympic athletics

Representing United States

Paralympic Games
Gold medal – first place	1992 Barcelona	400 metres - TS2
Bronze medal – third place	2000 Sydney	800 metres - T44

Joseph LeMar is a paralympic athlete from the United States competing mainly in category T44 400m events.

Joseph competed in the TS2 400m at the 1992 Summer Paralympics in Barcelona winning the gold medal. He then missed his home games in Atlanta in 1996 but did return for the 2000 Summer Paralympics where as well as competing in the T44 400m and T46 4 × 400 m he won a bronze medal in the T44 800m. He now coaches high school track and field and cross country.
