= Unified Team at the 1992 Summer Paralympics =

- The Paralympic flag
- IPC code: EUN

in Barcelona
- Medals Ranked 8th: Gold 19 Silver 15 Bronze 16 Total 50

Summer Paralympics appearances (overview)
- 1992

Other related appearances
- Soviet Union (1988); Estonia (1992–pres.); Latvia (1992–pres.); Lithuania (1992–pres.); Belarus (1994–pres.); Kazakhstan (1994–pres.); Russia (1994–2014); Armenia (1996–pres.); Azerbaijan (1996–pres.); Kyrgyzstan (1996–pres.); Moldova (1996–pres.); Ukraine (1996–pres.); Turkmenistan (2000–pres.); Tajikistan (2004–pres.); Uzbekistan (2004–pres.); Georgia (2008–pres.); RPC (2020)

The Unified Team at the 1992 Summer Paralympics in Barcelona, Spain, was a joint team consisting of seven of the fifteen former Soviet republics. It competed under the IOC country code EUN (from the French Equipe Unifiée).

== Members ==
- Armenia
- Azerbaijan
- Belarus
- Kyrgyzstan
- Moldova
- Russia
- Ukraine

== Archery ==
The Unified Team entered four of its sixty two competitors, three men and one woman. The woman, Tatiana Grishko, won the gold medal in the Women's Individual Open. She came fourth in the qualification round with 1073 points. In the semi-final she beat Birthe Morgenson 78 points to 71. In the final she beat Siv Thulin 87 points to 77.
