= Theo Duyvestijn =

Dutch Paralympic athlete

Medal record

Track and field (athletics)

Representing Netherlands

Paralympic Games
Gold medal – first place	1992 Barcelona	1500 metres - TW2
Silver medal – second place	1992 Barcelona	400 metres - TW2
Bronze medal – third place	1988 Seoul	100 metres - 1C

Theo Duyvestijn (born c. 1964) is a Paralympian athlete from the Netherlands competing mainly in category TW2 track events.

Duyvestijn competed in two Paralympics firstly in 1988 where he competed as a 1C athlete in all the track races from 100m to 1500m winning a bronze medal in the 100m. His second games came in Barcelona in 1992 where he won the 1500m TW2 gold medal and the 400m TW2 silver medal as well as competing in the 200m and marathon.
