= Pieter Badenhorst =

South African Paralympic athlete

Medal record

Men's para-athletics

Representing South Africa

Paralympic Games
Gold medal – first place	1992 Barcelona	400 m TS3
Silver medal – second place	1992 Barcelona	200 m TS3

Pieter Badenhorst is a paralympic athlete from South Africa, competing mainly in category T46 sprint events.

Badenhorst competed in three paralympics starting with the 1992 Summer Paralympics and continuing through the 1996 and 2000 games. In the 1992 games, he competed in the triple jump and won a gold medal in the 400m. It took a world record from Poland's Jerzy Szelezak to deny him a second gold in the 200m. Badenhorst's other two appearances at games were not as successful, as he won no further medals despite competing in the 100m, 200m and long jump in 1996, and the 100m and 200m in 2000.
