= Patrice Gerges =

French Paralympic athlete

Medal record

Men's para athletics

Representing France

Paralympic Games
Gold medal – first place	1992 Barcelona	400 metres - TS4
Silver medal – second place	1992 Barcelona	800 metres - TS4
Bronze medal – third place	1992 Barcelona	Long jump - J4
Bronze medal – third place	1996 Atlanta	400 metres - T42-46

Patrice Gerges is a paralympic athlete from France competing mainly in category T46 400m and 800m events.

In the 1992 Summer Paralympics Patrice competed in the 1500m but won a gold medal in the 400m, a silver in the 800m and a bronze in the long jump. At the 1996 Summer Paralympics concentrating on the 400m and 800m he failed to match his previous achievement by winning a bronze in the 400m.
