= Oscar Pupo =

Cuban Paralympic athlete

Medal record

Paralympic athletics

Representing Cuba

Paralympic Games
| Gold medal – first place | 1992 Barcelona | 800 metres - B1 |
| Silver medal – second place | 1992 Barcelona | 400 metres - B1 |

Oscar Pupo is a paralympic athlete from Cuba competing mainly in category B1 400m and 800m events.

Oscar was part of the Cuban Paralympic team that travelled to Barcelona for the 1992 Summer Paralympics there he won a silver medal in the B1 400m, behind a world record time set by Carlos Conceicao of Portugal and won a gold medal in the B1 800m.
