= Consuelo Rodríguez (athlete) =

Mexican Paralympic athlete

Medal record

Paralympic athletics

Representing Mexico

Paralympic Games
Bronze medal – third place	1992 Barcelona	Shot Put - THS2

Consuelo Rodriguez is a paralympic athlete from Mexico competing mainly in category THS2 throwing events.

Consuelo was part of the Mexican paralympic team that travelled to Barcelona for the 1992 Summer Paralympics. There she competed in all three throws winning the bronze medal in the shot put.
