= David Larson (Paralympian) =

American Paralympic athlete

Medal record

Track and field (athletics)

Representing United States

Paralympic Games
Gold medal – first place	1992 Barcelona	100 metres - C3-4
Gold medal – first place	1992 Barcelona	200 metres - C3-4
Gold medal – first place	1992 Barcelona	400 metres - C3-4
Gold medal – first place	1992 Barcelona	800 metres - C3-4
Gold medal – first place	1996 Atlanta	400 metres - T32-33
Bronze medal – third place	1988 Seoul	100 metres - C4-5
Bronze medal – third place	1988 Seoul	400 metres - C4-5
Bronze medal – third place	1996 Atlanta	100 metres - T33

David Larson is a paralympic athlete from the United States competing mainly in category T34 sprint events.

Larson has competed for the United States at four Paralympics, his first was in 1988 where he won bronze in both the 100m and 400m as well as competing in the club throwing event. The 1992 Summer Paralympics in Barcelona turned out to be special for David as he won gold in the 100m, 200m, 400m and 800m. Larson's third games were in 1996 Summer Paralympics in his home country, there he won defended his 400m title and won bronze in the 100m. His final games came in 2000 where he competed in the 100m, 200m and 400m but failed to medal in any of them.
