= Hal Merrill =

Canadian Paralympic athlete

Personal information
- Nationality: Canada
- Born: 2 July 1964 (age 61) Fredericton, New Brunswick
- Died: March 14, 2025 (aged 60) Fredericton, New Brunswick
Medal record
Athletics
Paralympic Games
Bronze medal – third place	1992 Barcelona	Javelin Throw - THW2
Bronze medal – third place	1992 Barcelona	Shot Put - THW2
Bronze medal – third place	1996 Atlanta	Shot Put - F51

Hal Wade Merrill (July 2, 1964 – March 14, 2025) was a paralympic track and field athlete from Fredericton, New Brunswick, Canada, who competed in the category F52 throwing events.

== Career ==
Merrill has competed in three Paralympics and has won three bronze medals over the course of his career. At the 1992 Summer Paralympics in Barcelona, Spain, Merrill won two bronze medals in the F52 shot put and discus throws, and placed 10th in the discus. At the 1996 Summer Paralympics in Atlanta, United States, Merrill won a bronze medal in the F51 shot put and placed 4th in the javelin. Merrill also competed in the 2000 Summer Paralympics in Sydney, Australia, but was unable to place on the podium, finishing 8th in the shot put, 5th in the javelin, and 5th in the discus.

== See also ==
- Athletics New Brunswick
