= Omar Turro =

Cuban Paralympic athlete

Medal record

Paralympic athletics

Representing Cuba

Paralympic Games
Gold medal – first place	1992 Barcelona	400 metres - B2
Silver medal – second place	1992 Barcelona	100 metres - B2
Bronze medal – third place	1992 Barcelona	200 metres - B2

Omar Turro is a paralympic athlete from Cuba competing mainly in category T12 sprint events.

Omar competed in two paralympic games, his first in 1992 led to a gold medal in the 400m, silver medal in the 100m and bronze in the 200m. His second games came twelve years later in 2004 where he competed in the 200m and 400m but was unable to make the final in either event.
