= Carlos Conceição =

Angolan filmmaker (born 1979)

- Born: Carlos Miguel V. Conceição; August 5, 1979 (age 47); Angola
- Education: Lisbon Theatre and Film School
- Occupations: Director, producer, writer, cinematographer, actor, editor
- Years active: 2005–present

Carlos Miguel V. Conceição (born 5 August 1979), is an Angola-born Portuguese filmmaker. Conceição is best known as the director of the films Tommy Guns and Serpentarius as well as the horror film Name Above Title.

== Personal life ==
He was born on August 5, 1979, in Angola. In 2002, he obtained a degree in English, with specialization in Romantic literature, and authored monographs on J. G. Ballard and J. M. Coetzee. He later obtained another degree, this time in cinema, from the Lisbon Theatre and Film School in 2006.

== Career ==
He started his career in 2005 as a music video and art film producer. In 2013, he made the short Versailles, which was in competition at Locarno Festival, Curtas Vila do Conde and Mar Del Plata Festivals. His 2014 film Goodnight Cinderella had its premiere in the Critics' Week of the Cannes Film Festival. In 2017, his film Bad Bunny made an appearance again at Cannes.

He released his first feature film Serpentarius in 2019. The film had its premiere at the Berlin International Film Festival and was later selected for the Viennale in 2019. It received numerous awards at several international film festivals including: Best First Feature Film at Doclisboa, New Visions Award for Best Feature in the Sicilia Queer Filmfest, Honorable Mention of the International Feature Film Competition and Best Film Editing Award at the Madrid International Film Festival, Honorable Mention of the Feature Film Competition at the Festival du nouveau cinéma in Montreal, Best Director at Pontevedra. The film then won a Public award at the Burgas International Film Festival as well. The medium-length Name Above Title followed in late 2020 and got him the Best Director award at the prestigious Festival de Cine Europeo de Sevilla

Tommy Guns had its world premiere at the Locarno Festival 2022 where it was awarded the Europa Cinemas Label for best European film. It was picked up and distributed in North America by Kino Lorber.

== Filmography ==
| Year | Film | Role | Genre | Ref. |
|---|---|---|---|---|
| 2007 | Lady Godiva's Operation | Director, writer, editor | Music video for Pop Dell'Arte | |
| 2008 | A Couple of Spiders | Director, screenplay, editor, producer | Video installation | |
| 2009 | Ordena Que Te Ame | Director, writer, editor | Music video for Mundo Cão | |
| 2010 | Temporária | Director, screenplay, editor | Video installation | |
| 2010 | The Flesh | Director, writer, editor, producer | Short fiction film | |
| 2011 | Hell, or Pool Keeping | Director, writer, editor, producer | Short fiction film | |
| 2013 | Versailles | Director, writer, editor, producer | Short fiction film | |
| 2014 | Goodnight, Cinderella | Director, writer, editor, producer | Short fiction film | |
| 2014 | Turquoise Boy | Director, screenplay, editor, producer | Web video for Sonic Youth | |
| 2015 | Wake Up Leviathan | Director, writer, editor, producer, cinematographer | Video documentary short | |
| 2017 | Bad Bunny | Director, writer | Short fiction film | |
| 2019 | Serpentarius | Director, writer, editor, producer, cinematographer, voice | Feature Film | |
| 2020 | The King of Europe | Director, writer, editor | Music video for Pop Dell'Arte | |
| 2020 | Name Above Title | Director, writer, editor, producer | Mid-length fiction Film | |
| 2022 | Tommy Guns | Director, writer, editor, co-producer | Feature Film | |
| 2026 | Bodyhackers | Director, writer, producer | TV Movie | |
