= Switzerland at the 1992 Summer Paralympics =

- IPC code: SUI
- NPC: Swiss Paralympic Committee
- Website: www.swissparalympic.ch

in Barcelona
- Competitors: 41
- Medals Ranked 20th: Gold 6 Silver 16 Bronze 13 Total 35

Summer Paralympics appearances (overview)
- 1960; 1964; 1968; 1972; 1976; 1980; 1984; 1988; 1992; 1996; 2000; 2004; 2008; 2012; 2016; 2020; 2024

Switzerland competed at the 1992 Summer Paralympics in Barcelona, Spain. 41 competitors from Switzerland won 35 medals including 6 gold, 16 silver and 13 bronze and finished 20th in the medal table.

== See also ==
- Switzerland at the Paralympics
- Switzerland at the 1992 Summer Olympics
