= South Africa at the 1992 Summer Paralympics =

- IPC code: RSA
- NPC: South African Sports Confederation and Olympic Committee
- Website: www.sascoc.co.za

in Barcelona
- Competitors: 10
- Medals Ranked 31st: Gold 4 Silver 1 Bronze 3 Total 8

Summer Paralympics appearances (overview)
- 1964; 1968; 1972; 1976; 1980–1988; 1992; 1996; 2000; 2004; 2008; 2012; 2016; 2020; 2024

South Africa competed at the 1992 Summer Paralympics in Barcelona, Spain. 10 competitors from South Africa won 8 medals, including 4 gold, 1 silver and 3 bronze and finished 27th in the medal table.

== Flag ==
Flag used to represent South Africa at the 1992 Summer Paralympic Games

The team used a specially designed sporting flag for these games, which was also used at the 1992 Summer Olympic Games. The flag consisted of a white field charged with a grey diamond, which represented the countries mineral wealth, three cascading bands of blue, orange and green, which represented the sea, the land and agriculture respectively and the Olympic rings.

== See also ==
- South Africa at the Paralympics
- South Africa at the 1992 Summer Olympics
