= Jeff Tiessen =

Canadian Paralympic athlete

Medal record

Paralympic athletics

Representing Canada

Paralympic Games
Gold medal – first place	1988 Seoul	400 metres - A5A7
Silver medal – second place	1984 Stoke Mandeville / New York	High Jump - A5
Bronze medal – third place	1992 Barcelona	400 metres - TS3

Jeff Tiessen is a paralympic athlete from Canada competing mainly in category TS3 sprint events.

== Biography ==
Tiessen competed in three Paralympics games across three sports and winning three medals. His first games in 1984 he competed in swimming and athletics, in the swimming he competed in the A5 class in the 50m breaststroke, 100m freestyle and 150m individual medley, In athletics he competed in the A5 class 400m and won the silver medal in the high jump. In 1988 concentrating on athletics this time he won a gold medal in the 400m A5A7 class race as well as competing in the 100m and 200m. His final games brought his final medal a bronze in his only event, the 400m for TS3 class athletes. In 2010, Tiessen was inducted into the Canadian Disability Hall of Fame.
