= Rosa Vera =

Mexican Paralympic athlete

Medal record

Women's para-athletics

Representing Mexico

Paralympic Games
Bronze medal – third place	1992 Barcelona	4x100 m relay TW3-4

Rosa Vera is a paralympic athlete from Mexico competing mainly in category TW4 Track events.

== Biography ==
Rosa Vera took part in the 1992 Summer Paralympics 100m, 200m, 400m and 800m but it was as part of the Mexican 4 × 100 m relay team that she won a bronze medal.
