= Ross Davis (athlete) =

American Paralympic athlete

Medal record

Paralympic athletics

Representing United States

Paralympic Games
Gold medal – first place	1996 Atlanta	100 metres - T34
Gold medal – first place	2000 Sydney	100 metres - T34
Silver medal – second place	1992 Barcelona	100 metres - C3-4
Silver medal – second place	1992 Barcelona	200 metres - C3-4
Silver medal – second place	1992 Barcelona	400 metres - C3-4
Silver medal – second place	1992 Barcelona	800 metres - C3-4
Bronze medal – third place	1996 Atlanta	400 metres - T34
Bronze medal – third place	2000 Sydney	200 metres - T34
Bronze medal – third place	2000 Sydney	400 metres - T34

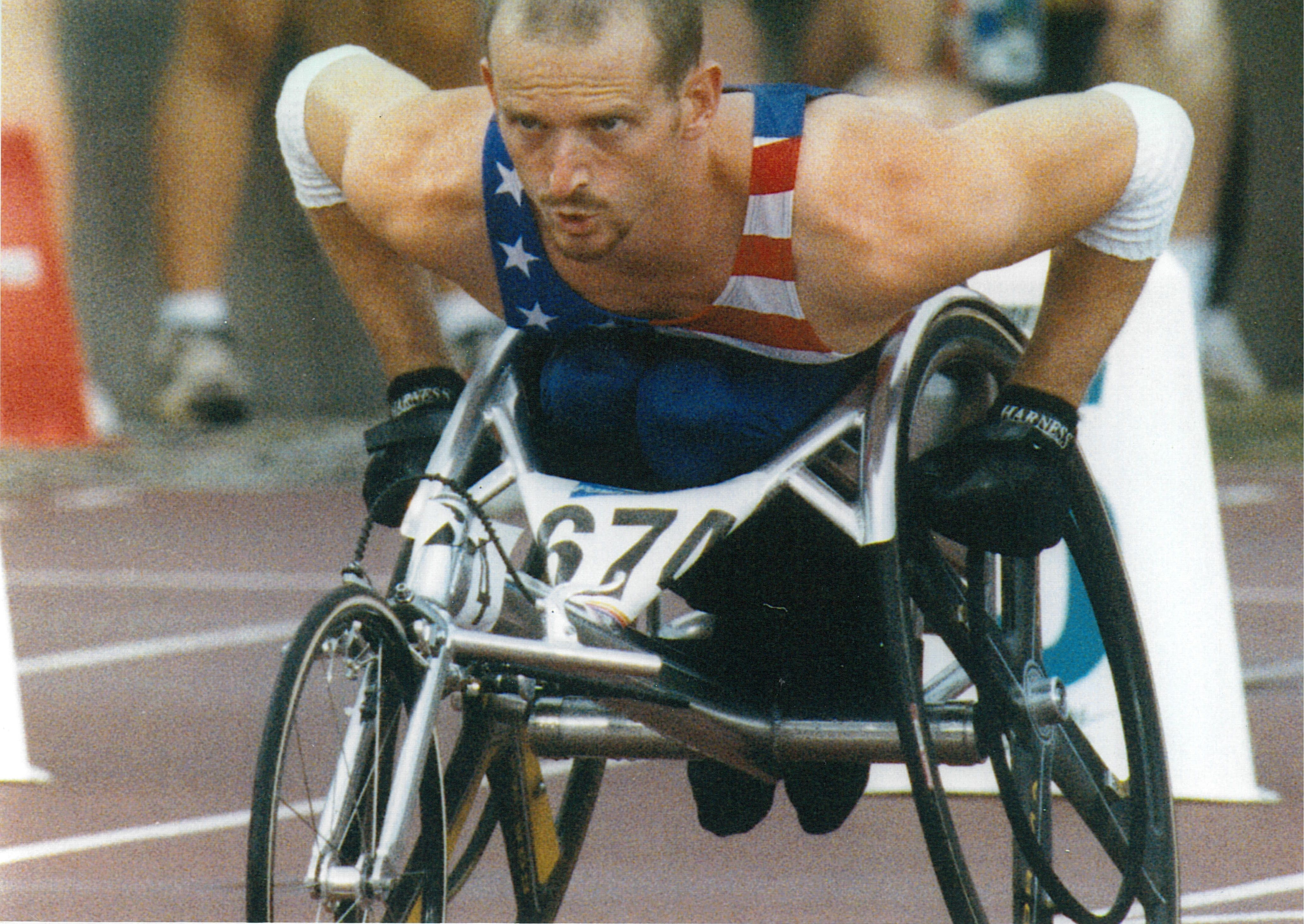

Ross Davis is a paralympic athlete from the United States competing mainly in category T34 sprint events.

Davis competed in three paralympic games, firstly in Barcelona, Spain in 1992 Summer Paralympics. In these games he competed in the 100m, 200m, 400m and 800m for C3-4 athletes winning silver medals in all four events. In the 1996 Summer Paralympics in his home country, Davis won a gold medal in the 100m and a bronze in the 400m. Four years later, in 2000 Summer Paralympics, he won bronze medals in both the 200m and 400m, and a gold medal in the T34 100m.
