= Joe Gaetani =

American Paralympic athlete

Medal record

Track and field (athletics)

Representing United States

Paralympic Games
Gold medal – first place	1992 Barcelona	100 metres - TS1
Gold medal – first place	1992 Barcelona	200 metres - TS1
Silver medal – second place	1992 Barcelona	4x100 metre relay - TS2,4

Joe Gaetani is a paralympic athlete from the United States competing mainly in category TS1 sprint events.

Joe competed in the 1992 Summer Paralympics where he broke the world record in the 100m and 200m to win both gold medals and was part of the American 4 × 100 m team that finished 0.02 seconds behind the world record setting Australian team.
