= Gunther Belitz =

German Paralympic athlete

Medal record

Paralympic athletics

Representing Germany

Paralympic Games
Gold medal – first place	1992 Barcelona	Long Jump - J1
Silver medal – second place	1996 Atlanta	Long Jump - F42
Bronze medal – third place	1992 Barcelona	100 metres - TS1
Bronze medal – third place	2000 Sydney	High Jump - F42

Gunther Belitz is a paralympic athlete from Germany competing mainly in category F42 high and long jump events. He is also editor of the German magazine Handicap.

== Biography ==
Belitz has competed in four Paralympics, his first in 1988 he competed in just the long jump. Four years later in the 1992 Summer Paralympics he competed in the high jump and 4 × 100 m relay as well as winning the bronze medal in the TS1 100m and a gold in the J1 long jump. In the 1996 Summer Paralympics he competed in the 100m and high jump and won a silver medal in the long jump. His last appearance in a Paralympics was in 2000 where he competed in the long and high jump, this time winning a bronze medal in the F42 high jump.
