= Dennis Oehler =

American Paralympic athlete

Medal record

Track and field (athletics)

Representing United States

Paralympic Games
Gold medal – first place	1988 Seoul	100 metres - A4A9
Gold medal – first place	1988 Seoul	200 metres - A4A9
Gold medal – first place	1988 Seoul	400 metres - A4A9
Gold medal – first place	1992 Barcelona	Long Jump - J2
Silver medal – second place	1992 Barcelona	100 metres - TS2
Silver medal – second place	1992 Barcelona	4x100 metre relay - TS2,4
Silver medal – second place	1992 Barcelona	Pentathlon - PS4xxx
Bronze medal – third place	1988 Seoul	4x100 metre relay - A2A4-7
Bronze medal – third place	1992 Barcelona	200 metres - TS2
Bronze medal – third place	1996 Atlanta	4x100 metre relay - T42-46

Dennis Oehler was a paralympic athlete from the United States competing mainly in category PS4 pentathlon and TS2 sprint events.

Dennis competed in three Paralympics for the United States winning a toal of 10 medals including four gold. At his first games in 1988 he won the 100m, 200m and 400m all in new world records, he also helped the United States team to win the bronze medal in the 4 × 100 m. At the 1992 Summer Paralympics Dennis didn't compete in the 400m and was unable to defend his titles in the 100m and 200m finishing second and third respectively he did however win a gold medal in the long jump in a new world record, he also won silver in the pentathlon and as part of the United States 4 × 100 m relay team. His third games came in his home country for the 1996 Summer Paralympics where he competed in the 100m and long jump and won a bronze medal in the 4 × 100 m.

Dennis was inducted into the Suffolk Sports Hall of Fame on Long Island in the Track & Field Category with the Class of 2000.
