= Jeddie Schabort =

South African Paralympic athlete

Medal record

Paralympic athletics

Representing South Africa

Paralympic Games
Bronze medal – third place	1992 Barcelona	Marathon - TW3-4

Jeddie Krige Schabort is a Paralympic athlete from South Africa. He represented South Africa in wheelchair racing at the 1992 and 1996 Summer Paralympics before switching to the United States team for 2000 and 2004.

Schabort served in the South African Army and lost both of his legs, one finger, a yard of his small intestine, and part of his stomach in 1987. He nearly died in intensive care at the army field hospital.

He competed in both the 1992 and 1996 Summer Paralympics for South Africa. In 1992 he competed in the 1500m, 5000m and marathon, winning a bronze medal in the marathon. In the 1996 games he competed in the 5000m, 10000m, and marathon but was unable to add to his medal tally. In 1997, Schabort moved from South Africa to the United States in order to prepare for the 2000 Summer Paralympics. He intended to stay in the United States temporarily, but moved there permanently after his parents gained permanent residency. He joined the United States Paralympic team for 2000. He switched his sport to paratriathlon in 2004.

== See also ==
- South Africa at the Paralympics
- United States at the Paralympics
