= Joanne Berdan =

Canadian Paralympic athlete

Personal information
- Born: Joanne Bouw; May 1, 1963 (age 63) St. Catharines, Ontario

Sport
- Country: Canada
- Sport: Paralympic athletics
- Disability: Cerebral palsy
- Retired: 1996
Medal record
Athletics
Paralympic Games
| Gold medal – first place | 1984 New York/Stoke Mandeville | Javelin throw C7 |
| Gold medal – first place | 1984 New York/Stoke Mandeville | Shot put C7 |
| Gold medal – first place | 1988 Seoul | Discus C7 |
| Gold medal – first place | 1988 Seoul | Javelin throw C7 |
| Gold medal – first place | 1988 Seoul | Shot put C7 |
| Gold medal – first place | 1992 Barcelona/Madrid | Discus C5–8 |
| Gold medal – first place | 1992 Barcelona/Madrid | Javelin throw C5–8 |
| Gold medal – first place | 1992 Barcelona/Madrid | Shot put C5–8 |
| Bronze medal – third place | 1984 New York/Stoke Mandeville | Long jump C7 |
| Bronze medal – third place | 1984 New York/Stoke Mandeville | Discus throw C7 |

Joanne Berdan (née Bouw; born May 1, 1963) is a Canadian medallist in Paralympic athletics. During her Paralympic career, Berdan won a total of 10 Paralympic medals. She was inducted into both the Canadian Paralympic Committee Hall of Fame and Canadian Disability Hall of Fame in 2003.

== Early life and education ==
Berdan was born on May 1, 1963, in St. Catharines, Ontario. She completed her post-secondary studies at the University of Toronto in 1986.

== Career ==
Berdan won her first Paralympic medals at the 1984 Summer Paralympics. She won a gold in shot put and javelin alongside a bronze in discus and long jump. At the following Paralympics, Berdan was gold in the discus, javelin and shot put events during the 1988 Summer Paralympics. Her final Paralympic medals were at the 1992 Summer Paralympics where she repeated her three golds medals from the previous Paralympics.

Alongside her Paralympic medals in 1992, Berdan broke the world records for shot put and discus in the cerebral palsy sport classification. While she competed at the 1996 Summer Paralympics in the shot put and discus, Berdan did not medal. Outside of the Paralympics, Berdan won gold at the 1990 World Championships and Games for the Disabled and the 1994 IPC Athletics World Championships. She ended her sports career in 1996 and is currently working in pharmacy.

== Awards and honours ==
In 2002, Berdan was awarded the Golden Jubilee Medal. The following year, Berdan was inducted into the Canadian Paralympic Committee Hall of Fame and the Canadian Disability Hall of Fame. Other hall of fame inductions include the Canadian Cerebral Palsy Sports Association Hall of Fame in 2005 and the University of Toronto Sports Hall of Fame in 2015.

== Personal life ==
Berdan is married and has one child.
