= Araceli Castro =

Mexican Paralympic athlete

Medal record

Paralympic athletics

Representing Mexico

Paralympic Games
Silver medal – second place	1988 Seoul	4x100 metre relay - 2-6
Silver medal – second place	1996 Atlanta	Discus Throw - F41
Bronze medal – third place	1992 Barcelona	4x100 metre relay - TW3-4
Bronze medal – third place	1992 Barcelona	Discus Throw - THS2
Bronze medal – third place	1992 Barcelona	Javelin Throw - THS2

Araceli Castro is a paralympic athlete from Mexico competing mainly in category F41 throwing events.

Araceli's Paralympic games career began in 1988 where she was part of the Mexican class 2-6 4 × 200 m relay team that won a silver medal. Four years later in Barcelona in 1992 she was again part of the Mexican relay team, this time over 100m and this time winning a bronze, she also competed in all three individual throwing events winning bronze in both the discus and javelin. The 1996 Summer Paralympics didn't prove quite so successful as despite again competing in all three throws Araceli only managed one medal, but it was her best finish in an individual event with a silver in the discus. After missing the 2000 Summer Paralympics she again competed in the 2004 Summer Paralympics but was unable to add to her medal tally in either the javelin or shot put.
