= Richard Reelie =

Canadian Paralympic athlete

Medal record

Paralympic athletics

Representing Canada

Paralympic Games
Gold medal – first place	1988 Seoul	Discus Throw - 1B
Gold medal – first place	1988 Seoul	Javelin Throw - 1B
Gold medal – first place	1988 Seoul	Shot Put - 1B
Gold medal – first place	1992 Barcelona	400 metres - TW2
Gold medal – first place	1992 Barcelona	800 metres - TW2
Silver medal – second place	1992 Barcelona	1500 metres - TW2
Silver medal – second place	1992 Barcelona	200 metres - TW2
Silver medal – second place	2000 Sydney	800 metres - T52
Bronze medal – third place	2000 Sydney	5000 metres - T52

Richard Reelie is a paralympic athlete from Canada competing mainly in category T52 wheelchair racing events.

Richard has competed at five Paralympics, the first in 1988 saw Richard win 3 gold medals in the Class 1B shot, discus and javelin. From 1992 Richard concentrated on wheelchair racing winning the gold medal in the TW2 400m and 800m and silver medals in the 200m and 1500m. The 1996 Summer Paralympics were the first time Richard failed to medal in any event and left him without a medal in the 200m, 400m and 800m. He returned to medal winning form in the 2000 Summer Paralympics winning silver in the 800m and bronze in the 5000m but missing out in the 1500m.
