= Luke Gingras =

Canadian Paralympic athlete

Medal record

Paralympic athletics

Representing Canada

Paralympic Games
Silver medal – second place	1992 Barcelona	4x400 metre relay - TW3-4
Bronze medal – third place	1992 Barcelona	200 metres - TW3
Bronze medal – third place	1992 Barcelona	800 metres - TW3

Luke Gingras is a paralympic athlete from Canada competing mainly in category TW3 wheelchair racing events.

Luke competed in just the marathon at his first Paralympics in Seoul in 1988 Summer Paralympics. In 1992 he competed in the 100m, 400m and Marathon as well as winning bronze medals in the 200m and 800m and a silver as part of the German 4 × 400 m relay team.
