= Tracey Melesko =

Canadian Paralympic athlete

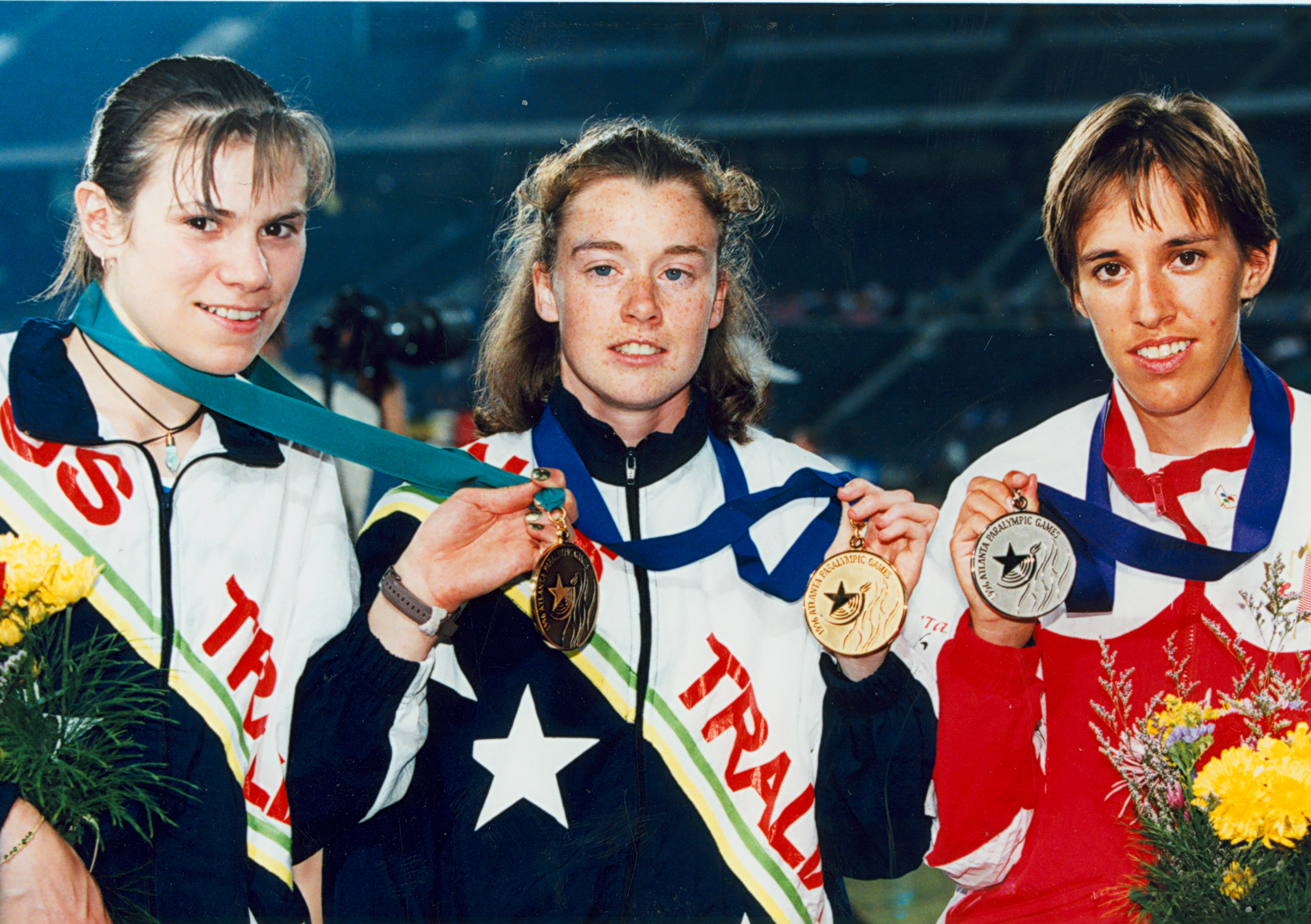
- Tracey Melesko (right) with her silver medal in the 1996 200m MH

Medal record

Paralympic athletics

Representing Canada

Paralympic Games
Silver medal – second place	1992 Madrid	200 metres - MH
Silver medal – second place	1996 Atlanta	200 metres - MH
Silver medal – second place	1996 Atlanta	Long Jump - MH
Bronze medal – third place	1992 Madrid	400 metres - MH
Bronze medal – third place	2000 Sydney	200 metres - T20

Tracey Melesko is a paralympic athlete from Canada competing mainly in category T20 sprint and long jump events.

Tracey competed in the 1996 Summer Paralympics winning silvers in both her events, the 200m and long jump for mentally disabled people. In 2000 she competed in the 100m as well as the 200m and long jump and won a bronze medal in the 200m T20 class.
