= Clayton Gerein =

Canadian wheelchair athlete (1964–2010)

Personal information
- Born: 24 May 1964 North Battleford, Saskatchewan, Canada
- Died: 22 January 2010 (aged 45) Regina, Saskatchewan, Canada

Sport
- Country: Canada
- Sport: Paralympic athletics Paralympic swimming
- Disability class: T52
Medal record
Paralympic swimming
Representing Canada
Paralympic Games
Gold medal – first place	1988 Seoul	400m 1B
Gold medal – first place	1988 Seoul	800m 1B
Gold medal – first place	1988 Seoul	5000m 1B
Gold medal – first place	1992 Barcelona	5000m TW2
Gold medal – first place	1992 Barcelona	Marathon TW2
Gold medal – first place	1996 Atlanta	5000m T51
Gold medal – first place	2000 Sydney	Marathon T52
Silver medal – second place	1988 Seoul	1500m 1B
Silver medal – second place	1996 Atlanta	Marathon T51
Bronze medal – third place	1988 Seoul	Marathon 1B
Bronze medal – third place	1992 Barcelona	800m TW2
Bronze medal – third place	1992 Barcelona	1500m TW2
Bronze medal – third place	1996 Atlanta	1500m T51
Bronze medal – third place	2004 Athens	Marathon T52
World Championships
Gold medal – first place	1988 Birmingham	5000m T53
Gold medal – first place	1998 Birmingham	Marathon T52
Silver medal – second place	2002 Lille	800m T52
Silver medal – second place	2002 Lille	5000m T52
Silver medal – second place	2002 Lille	Marathon T52

Clayton Gerein (May 24, 1964 – January 22, 2010) was a Canadian wheelchair athlete, who won 14 medals in racing events at the Paralympic Games between 1984 and 2008.

Born and raised in North Battleford, Saskatchewan, While training racehorses, Gerein's neck broke in 1982. He first competed as a swimmer at the 1984 Paralympics in Los Angeles, but subsequently had his greatest success competing in racing events, winning seven gold, four silver and three bronze medals during his racing career. He retired from competitive racing after the 2008 Paralympics. Clayton lived in Pilot Butte, Saskatchewan for a long part of his lifetime and career and was seen all around town practicing.

Clayton also coached and mentored Paralympic Champion Lisa Franks, after he met her while she was in the hospital recovering from a spinal cord injury.

Gerein was named SaskSport's male athlete of the year in 1987, 1996 and 2001.

Gerein died from a brain tumour in Regina on January 22, 2010. He was 45.
