= Marc Quessy =

Canadian Paralympic athlete

Medal record

Paralympic athletics

Representing Canada

Paralympic Games
Gold medal – first place	1988 Seoul	Marathon - 2
Silver medal – second place	1988 Seoul	100 metres - 2
Silver medal – second place	1992 Barcelona	200 metres - TW3
Silver medal – second place	1992 Barcelona	400 metres - TW3
Silver medal – second place	1992 Barcelona	4x100 metre relay - TW3-4
Silver medal – second place	1992 Barcelona	4x400 metre relay - TW3-4
Bronze medal – third place	1996 Atlanta	800 metres - T52-53
Bronze medal – third place	1996 Atlanta	4x400 metre relay - T52-53

Marc Quessy is a paralympic athlete from Canada competing mainly in category T52 wheelchair racing events. Before his transition to the wheelchair race, Marc was a member of the Canadian wheelchair basketball team that won the silver medal at the Gold Cup in Melbourne, Australia, in 1986.

Marc has competed in three Paralympics and every world championship from 1986 until 1999. Marc holds world record and medals in various track distances, including 100m, 200m, 400m, 800m and 5000m. Arguably, his most successful year was 1988, during which he competed in only two events: the 100m and the marathon. He won a silver medal in former and gold medal in the later. In 1992, he was much busier, competing in all the track events from 200m to marathon including both relays, winning silver in the 200m, 400m and both relays. In 1996, he competed in all the events from 200m to 5000m and the 4 × 400m relay and won bronze in the 800m and the relay.
