= Ljiljana Ljubisic =

Canadian Paralympic athlete

Medal record

Paralympic athletics

Representing Canada

Paralympic Games
| Gold medal – first place | 1992 Barcelona | Discus Throw - B1 |
| Silver medal – second place | 1992 Barcelona | Shot Put - B1 |
| Bronze medal – third place | 1996 Atlanta | Discus Throw - F10-11 |
| Bronze medal – third place | 1996 Atlanta | Shot Put - F10-11 |

Ljiljana Ljubisic is a paralympic athlete from Canada competing mainly in category F12 throws events.

Ljiljana has competed in the shot and discus at four consecutive Paralympics. She won the discus gold and shot silver medals in her second appearance in 1992 and followed this up with two bronze medals in the same events in 1996. However she was unable to win any medals in the 2000 Summer Paralympics.
