= Jason Delesalle =

Canadian Paralympic athlete

Medal record

Paralympic athletics

Representing Canada

Paralympic Games
Gold medal – first place	1996 Atlanta	Pentathlon - P12
Silver medal – second place	1992 Barcelona	Javelin throw B3
Bronze medal – third place	1996 Atlanta	Discus throw F12

Jason Delesalle is a Paralympic athlete from Canada competing mainly in category P12 pentathlon events.

He competed in the 1992 Summer Paralympics in Barcelona, Spain. There he won a silver medal in the men's Javelin throw - B3 event and went out in the first round of the men's 100 metres - B3 event. He also competed at the 1996 Summer Paralympics in Atlanta, United States. There he won a gold medal in the men's Pentathlon - P12 event, a bronze medal in the men's Discus throw - F12 event and finished fourth in the men's Javelin throw - F12 event. He also competed at the 2000 Summer Paralympics in Sydney, Australia. There he finished seventh in the men's Discus throw - F13 event
