= David Howe (athlete) =

Canadian Paralympic athlete

Medal record

Paralympic athletics

Representing Canada

Paralympic Games
Silver medal – second place	1992 Barcelona	5000 metres - C5-8
Bronze medal – third place	1988 Seoul	5000 metres Cross Country - C7xxx

David Howe is a paralympic athlete from Canada competing mainly in category T38 middle-distance events.

Howe competed in four Paralympics, winning two medals. In 1988 he competed in the javelin, 800m, 1500m and won a bronze medal in the 5000m Cross Country race for C7 athletes. In the 1992 Summer Paralympics he won a silver in the 5000m as well as competing in the 1500m. 1996 saw him in the 1500m and 5000m again but with no medals, and 2000 saw the same result from the 5000m.

After his athletic career, Howe worked as a journalist for the magazine Run, Jump, Throw. Based on his experiences working as a journalist at the 2004 Paralympics in Athens, he wrote an academic article about media coverage of competitive sports for disabled people.
