= Joe Zuppanic =

Canadian Paralympic athlete

Medal record

Paralympic athletics

Representing Canada

Paralympic Games
Bronze medal – third place	1992 Barcelona	100 metres - C3-4

Joe Zuppanic is a paralympic athlete from Canada competing mainly in category C3-4 sprint events.

Joe competed in Barcelona at the 1992 Summer Paralympics. He competed in the 100m, 200m, 400m 800m winning the bronze medal in the 100m.
