= Austria at the 1992 Summer Paralympics =

- IPC code: AUT
- NPC: Austrian Paralympic Committee
- Website: www.oepc.at (in German)

in Barcelona
- Competitors: 36
- Medals Ranked 22nd: Gold 5 Silver 4 Bronze 13 Total 22

Summer Paralympics appearances (overview)
- 1960; 1964; 1968; 1972; 1976; 1980; 1984; 1988; 1992; 1996; 2000; 2004; 2008; 2012; 2016; 2020; 2024

Austria competed at the 1992 Summer Paralympics in Barcelona, Spain. 36 competitors from Austria won 22 medals including 5 gold, 4 silver and 13 bronze and finished 22nd in the medal table.

== See also ==
- Austria at the Paralympics
- Austria at the 1992 Summer Olympics
