= Jacques Martin (athlete) =

Canadian Paralympic athlete

Medal record

Paralympic athletics

Representing Canada

Paralympic Games
Gold medal – first place	1984 Stoke Mandeville / New York	Shot Put - 4
Gold medal – first place	1988 Seoul	Shot Put - 4
Gold medal – first place	1992 Barcelona	Discus Throw - THW5
Gold medal – first place	1996 Atlanta	Discus Throw - F54
Silver medal – second place	1992 Barcelona	Javelin Throw - THW5
Silver medal – second place	1996 Atlanta	Javelin Throw - F54
Silver medal – second place	2000 Sydney	Discus Throw - F55
Bronze medal – third place	1988 Seoul	Discus Throw - 4
Bronze medal – third place	1992 Barcelona	Shot Put - THW5

Jacques Martin (c. 1959 – April 19, 2012) was a paralympic athlete from Canada competing mainly in category F55 throwing events.

== Biography ==
Martin was from Saint-Denis-de-Brompton, Quebec. Martin competed in every Paralympic Games from 1984 to Athens in 2004. In 1984 he won the shot put for class 4 athletes while also competing in the javelin and discus. He improved on this feat in 1988, defending his gold in the shot and winning a bronze in the discus. Although he did not win a third straight shot put competition in Barcelona in 1992, he still improved, winning the discus for the first time, winning his first medal in javelin, a silver, and finishing in the bronze medal position in the shot put. In the 1996 Summer Paralympics he defended his discus gold medal and again won silver in the javelin. The 2000 Summer Paralympics saw Martin pick up what would prove to be his last medal, a silver in the discus as he was unable to medal in either shot or javelin. He was also unable to medal in either the discus or javelin at the 2004 Summer Paralympics.

Martin died April 19, 2012, of a heart attack.
