= Frank Bruno (athlete) =

Canadian Paralympic athlete

Medal record

Paralympic athletics

Representing Canada

Paralympic Games
Gold medal – first place	1992 Barcelona	100 metres - C8
Gold medal – first place	1992 Barcelona	200 metres - C8
Gold medal – first place	1992 Barcelona	400 metres - C8

Frank Bruno is a paralympic athlete from Canada competing mainly in category F37 events.

Frank competed in the 1992 Summer Paralympics winning the gold medal in the 100m, 200m and 400m giving him a clean sweep of the sprint medals as well as competing in the long jump. At the 1996 Summer Paralympics he competed in the shot put but failed to medal. In 1998, Bruno became part of the Canadian Disability Hall of Fame.
