= List of Paralympic medalists in the 100 metres =

Athletics Paralympic medalists list

The 100 metres sprint has been one of original track events in the Summer Paralympics since 1968. The first track events were for male wheelchair competitors only (female wheelchair competitors took part in 60m sprints in that year, they took part in the 100m sprint in 1976). Able-bodied athletes took part in track events in 1976. Between the 2016 and 2020 Paralympics there was some new classifications added. Some amputees were moved from T42–T46 to T62–T66.

== Men's medal summaries ==
=== Ambulant athletes ===
| Class | Year | Gold | Silver | Bronze |
|---|---|---|---|---|
| C | 1976 | Aharon Danziger; Israel | Magella Belanger; Canada | Win Mg Tin; Burma |
| C | 1980 | Magella Belanger; Canada | Tony Wills; Canada | Joe Egan; Australia |
| C1 | 1976 | Hgwe Mg Tin; Burma | Than Mg Aung; Burma | Alois Karner; Austria |
| C1 | 1980 | Denis Lapalme; Canada | Alois Karner; Austria | Henryk Piatkowski; Poland |
| C6 | 1988 | Henrik Thomsen; Denmark | Colin Keay; Great Britain | Naoki Matsui; Japan |
| C6 | 1992 | Freeman Register; United States | Kim Du-chun; South Korea | Eric Stenback; United States |
| C7 | 1984 | Henrik Thomsen; Denmark | Michel Bapte; France | Mario de Baene; Belgium |
| C7 | 1988 | Haukur Gunnarsson; Iceland | Michel Bapte; France | Cheung Yiu Cheung; Hong Kong |
| C7 | 1992 | Peter Haber; Germany | Kang Sung Kook; South Korea | Cheung Yiu; Hong Kong |
| C8 | 1984 | Reinaldo Jose Pereira; Portugal | Antonio Carlos Martins; Portugal | Franz Hlozek; United States |
| C8 | 1988 | Son Hoon; South Korea | Jose Rebelo; Portugal | Thomas Dieti; United States |
| C8 | 1992 | Frank Bruno; Canada | Chan Shing Chung; Hong Kong | Thomas Dietz; United States |
| T35 | 1996 | Kim Du-chun; South Korea | Fernando Gomez; Spain | Freeman Register; United States |
| T35 | 2000 | Lloyd Upsdell; Great Britain | Roman Dzyuba; Ukraine | Richard White; Great Britain |
| T35 | 2004 | Teboho Mokgalagadi; South Africa | Jon Halldorsson; Iceland | Li Weichun; China |
| T35 | 2008 | Yang Sen; China | Fu Xinhan; China | Teboho Mokgalagadi; South Africa |
| T35 | 2012 | Iurii Tsaruk; Ukraine | Teboho Mokgalagadi; South Africa | Fu Xinhan; China |
| T35 | 2016 | Ihor Tsvietov; Ukraine | Fabio da Silva Bordignon; Brazil | Hernan Barreto; Argentina |
| T35 | 2020 | Dmitrii Safronov; RPC | Ihor Tsvietov; Ukraine | Artem Kalashian; RPC |
| T35 | 2024 | Ihor Tsvietov; Ukraine | Artem Kalashian; Neutral Paralympic Athletes | Dmitrii Safronov; Neutral Paralympic Athletes |
| T36 | 1996 | Mohamed Allek; Algeria | Peter Haber; Germany | Ahmed Hassan Mahmoud; Egypt |
| T36 | 2000 | So Wa Wai; Hong Kong | Serhiy Norenko; Ukraine | Andriy Zhyltsov; Ukraine |
| T36 | 2004 | Andriy Zhyltsov; Ukraine | So Wa Wai; Hong Kong | Che Mian; China |
| T36 | 2008 | Roman Pavlyk; Ukraine | Ben Rushgrove; Great Britain | So Wa Wai; Hong Kong |
| T36 | 2012 | Evgenii Shvetcov; Russia | Graeme Ballard; Great Britain | Roman Pavlyk; Ukraine |
| T36 | 2016 | Mohamad Ridzuan Mohamad Puzi; Malaysia | Yang Yufei; China | Rodrigo Parreira da Silva; Brazil |
| T36 | 2020 | Deng Peicheng; China | James Turner; Australia | Alexis Sebastian Chavez; Argentina |
| T36 | 2024 | | | |
| T37 | 1996 | Stephen Payton; Great Britain | Lincoln Scott; United States | Douglas Amador; Brazil |
| T37 | 2000 | Mohamed Allek; Algeria | Peter Haber; Germany | Matt Slade; New Zealand |
| T37 | 2004 | Yang Chen; China | Lukasz Labuch; Poland | Darren Thrupp; Australia |
| T37 | 2008 | Fanie van der Merwe; South Africa | Ma Yuxi; China | Sofiane Hamdi; Algeria |
| T37 | 2012 | Fanie van der Merwe; South Africa | Liang Yongbin; China | Roman Kapranov; Russia |
| T37 | 2016 | Charl du Toit; South Africa | Mostafa Fathalla Mohamed; Egypt | Fanie van der Merwe; South Africa |
| T37 | 2020 | Nick Mayhugh; United States | Andrei Vdovin; RPC | Saptoyogo Purnomo; Indonesia |
| T37 | 2024 | Ricardo Mendonça; Brazil | Saptoyogo Purnomo; Indonesia | Andrei Vdovin; Neutral Paralympic Athletes |
| T38 | 2000 | Timothy Sullivan; Australia | Mikhail Popov; Russia | Stephen Payton; Great Britain |
| T38 | 2004 | Timothy Sullivan; Australia | Zhou Wenjun; China | Farhat Chida; Tunisia |
| T38 | 2008 | Evan O'Hanlon; Australia | Zhou Wenjun; China | Mykyta Senyk; Ukraine |
| T38 | 2012 | Evan O'Hanlon; Australia | Dyan Buis; South Africa | Zhou Wenjun; China |
| T38 | 2016 | Hu Jianwen; China | Evan O'Hanlon; Australia | Edson Pinheiro; Brazil |
| T38 | 2020 | Thomas Young; Great Britain | Zhu Dening; China | Evan O'Hanlon; Australia |
| T38 | 2024 | Jaydin Blackwell; United States | Ryan Medrano; United States | Juan Campas; Colombia |

=== Amputee athletes ===
| Class | Year | Gold | Silver | Bronze |
|---|---|---|---|---|
| A5 | 1984 | Mathias Berghoter; West Germany | Jerzy Szlezak; Poland | Felix Abele; West Germany |
| A5/A7 | 1988 | Jerzy Szelezak; Poland | Matthias Bergamo; West Germany | Qiu Xuewen; China |
| A6 | 1984 | Harri Jauhiainen; Finland | Ira Rankin; United States | Peter Kirby; Australia |
| A6/A8/A9/L4 | 1988 | Nigel Coultas; Great Britain | William Wiebe; Canada | Rodney Nugent; Australia |
| D | 1976 | J. Harrison; Canada | S. Holcomb; Canada | None |
| D | 1980 | K. Wagner; West Germany | J. Harrison; Canada | K. Will; West Germany |
| D1 | 1976 | C. Brinkman; United States | M. Johnson; United States | D. Hoddleston; South Africa |
| D1 (prosthesis) | 1976 | Walter Fink; Austria | Only one competitor | |
| D1 (runners) | 1980 | Walter Fink; Austria | Only one competitor | |
| E | 1976 | Daniel Giladi; Israel | Ashari; Indonesia | Veikko Hiltunen; Finland |
| E | 1980 | Harri Jauhiainen; Finland | Jan Krauz; Poland | Wolfgang Pickl; Austria |
| E1 | 1976 | Cailloux; France | Only one competitor | |
| E1 | 1980 | Cato Zahl Pedersen; Norway | Yekutiel Gershoni; Israel | Marco Schmit; Luxembourg |
| F | 1976 | Antonio Delgado; Spain | J. Santos; Spain | Amran Cohen; Israel |
| F | 1980 | Lanham; Australia | Ko Shing Chi; Hong Kong | Gerhard Kolm; Austria |
| F1 | 1980 | Matthias Berg; West Germany | C. Peart; Canada | R. Scharmentke; West Germany |
| L5 | 1984 | Derek Nixon; Great Britain | Mathias Bingen; Luxembourg | None |
| L6 | 1984 | Reino Peltonen; Finland | Peter Williams; Great Britain | Robert Love; Great Britain |
| TS1 | 1992 | Joe Gaetani; United States | Lukas Christen; Switzerland | Gunther Belitz; Germany |
| TS2 | 1992 | Tony Volpentest; United States | Dennis Oehler; United States | Neil Fuller; Australia |
| TS4 | 1992 | Ajibola Adeoye; Nigeria | Nigel Coultas; Great Britain | Geir Sverrisson; Iceland |
| T42 | 1996 | Lukas Christen; Switzerland | Paul Gregori; France | Todd Schaffhauser; United States |
| T42 | 2000 | Earle Connor; Canada | Lukas Christen; Switzerland | Andriy Danylov; Ukraine |
| T42 | 2004 | Wojtek Czyz; Germany | Clavel Kayitare; France | Heinrich Popow; Germany |
| T42 | 2008 | Earle Connor; Canada | Heinrich Popow; Germany | John McFall; Great Britain |
| T42 | 2012 | Heinrich Popow; Germany | Scott Reardon; Australia | Wojtek Czyz; Germany |
| T42 | 2016 | Scott Reardon; Australia | Daniel Wagner; Denmark; Richard Whitehead; Great Britain | None |
| T43-44 | 1996 | Tony Volpentest; United States | Neil Fuller; Australia | Bradley Thomas; Australia |
| T44 | 2000 | Marlon Shirley; United States | Brian Frasure; United States | Neil Fuller; Australia |
| T44 | 2004 | Marlon Shirley; United States | Brian Frasure; United States | Oscar Pistorius; South Africa |
| T44 | 2008 | Oscar Pistorius; South Africa | Jerome Singleton; United States | Brian Frasure; United States |
| T44 | 2012 | Jonnie Peacock; Great Britain | Richard Browne; United States | Arnu Fourie; South Africa |
| T44 | 2016 | Jonnie Peacock; Great Britain | Liam Malone; New Zealand | Felix Streng; Germany |
| T44 | 2024 | Mpumelelo Mhlongo; South Africa | Yamel Luis Vives Suares; Cuba | Eddy Bernard; Malaysia |
| T45-46 | 1996 | Ajibola Adeoye; Nigeria | Geir Sverrisson; Iceland | Klaus Felser; Austria |
| T46 | 2000 | Elliot Mujaji; Zimbabwe | Liang Haichen; China | Tim Matthews; Australia |
| T46 | 2004 | Elliot Mujaji; Zimbabwe | Heath Francis; Australia | Sebastian Barc; France |
| T46 | 2008 | Heath Francis; Australia | Francis Kompaon; Papua New Guinea | Yohansson Nascimento; Brazil |
| T46 | 2012 | Zhao Xu; China | Raciel Gonzalez Isidoria; Cuba | Ola Abidogun; Great Britain |
| T47 | 2016 | Petrucio Ferreira dos Santos; Brazil | Michal Derus; Poland | Yohansson Nascimento; Brazil |
| T47 | 2020 | Petrucio Ferreira dos Santos; Brazil | Michal Derus; Poland | Washington Junior; Brazil |
| T63 | 2020 | Anton Prokhorov; RPC | Vinicius Goncalves Rodrigues; Brazil | Leon Schaefer; Germany |
| T63 | 2024 | Ezra Frech; United States | Daniel Wagner; Denmark | Vinícius Gonçalves Rodrigues; Brazil |
| T64 | 2020 | Felix Streng; Germany | Sherman Isidro Guity Guity; Costa Rica | Johannes Floors; Germany; Jonnie Peacock; Great Britain |
| T64 | 2024 | Sherman Isidro Guity Guity; Costa Rica | Maxcel Amo Manu; Italy | Felix Streng; Germany |

=== Blind athletes ===
| Class | Year | Gold | Silver | Bronze |
|---|---|---|---|---|
| B | 1976 | Winford Haynes; United States | Robert Faulkner; Australia | Jozsef Olah; Hungary |
| B1 | 1984 | Winford Haynes; United States | Yvan Bourdeau; Canada | Seodjeman Dipowidjojo; Netherlands; Stefan Bidzinski; Poland |
| B1 | 1988 | Victor Riabochtan; Soviet Union | Sergei Sevastianov; Soviet Union | Yukio Minami; Japan |
| B1 | 1992 | Sergei Sevastianov; Unified Team; José Manuel Rodríguez; Spain | None | Júlio Requena; Spain |
| B2 | 1984 | Mark Davies; Australia | Kurt Prall; Austria | Walter Knors; West Germany |
| B2 | 1988 | Alexandre Mokhir; Soviet Union | Andre Asbury; United States | Marcelino Paz; Spain |
| B2 | 1992 | Marcelino Paz; Spain | Omar Turro; Cuba | Miroslaw Pych; Poland |
| B3 | 1984 | Paul Smith; United States | Lucien Quemond; France | Yoshinori Simazu; Japan |
| B3 | 1988 | David Goodman; Australia | Uwe Mehlmann; West Germany | Aldo Manganaro; Italy |
| B3 | 1992 | Aldo Manganaro; Italy | Uwe Mehlmann; Germany | Enrique Cepeda; Cuba |
| T10 | 1996 | Júlio Requena; Spain | José Manuel Rodríguez; Spain | Andrew Curtis; Great Britain |
| T11 | 1996 | Juan Antonio Prieto; Spain | Miroslaw Pych; Poland | Jorge Núñez; Spain |
| T11 | 2000 | Lorenzo Ricci; Italy | Petr Novak; Czech Republic | Oleksandr Ivanyukhin; Ukraine |
| T11 | 2004 | Jose Armando Sayovo; Angola | Gautier Makunda; France | Luis Bullido; Spain |
| T11 | 2008 | Lucas Prado; Brazil | Jose Armando Sayovo; Angola | Gautier Makunda; France |
| T11 | 2012 | Xue Lei; China | Lucas Prado; Brazil | Felipe Gomes; Brazil |
| T11 | 2016 | David Brown; United States | Felipe Gomes; Brazil | Ananias Shikongo; Namibia |
| T11 | 2020 | Athanasios Ghavelas; Greece | Timothee Adolphe; France | Di Dongdong; China |
| T11 | 2024 | | | |
| T12 | 1996 | Aldo Manganaro; Italy | Enrique Caballero; Cuba | Leroi Court; Australia |
| T12 | 2000 | Li Qiang; China | Igor Pashchenko; Ukraine | Gabriel Potra; Portugal |
| T12 | 2004 | Adekundo Adesoji; Nigeria | Ricardo Santana; Venezuela | Matthias Schroeder; Germany |
| T12 | 2008 | Josiah Jamison; United States | Adekunle Adesoji; Nigeria | Yang Yuqing; China |
| T12 | 2012 | Fedor Trikolich; Russia | Mateusz Michalski; Poland | Li Yansong; China |
| T12 | 2016 | Leinier Savon Pineda; Cuba | Jonathan Ntutu; South Africa | Thomas Ulbricht; Germany |
| T12 | 2020 | Salum Ageze Kashafali; Norway | Noah Malone; United States | Roman Tarasov; RPC |
| T12 | 2024 | Serkan Yıldırım; Turkey | Noah Malone; United States | Joeferson Marinho; Brazil |
| T13 | 2000 | Nathan Meyer; South Africa | André Andrade; Brazil | Aldo Manganaro; Italy |
| T13 | 2004 | Royal Mitchell; United States | André Andrade; Brazil | Irving Bustamante; Cuba |
| T13 | 2008 | Jason Smyth; Ireland | Alexey Labzin; Russia | Luis Felipe Gutierrez; Cuba |
| T13 | 2012 | Jason Smyth; Ireland | Luis Felipe Gutierrez; Cuba | Jonathan Ntutu; South Africa |
| T13 | 2016 | Jason Smyth; Ireland | Johannes Nambala; Namibia | Chad Perris; Australia |
| T13 | 2020 | Jason Smyth; Ireland | Skander Djamil Athmani; Algeria | Jean Carlos Mina Aponzá; Colombia |
| T13 | 2024 | Skander Djamil Athmani; Algeria | Salum Ageze Kashafali; Norway | Shuta Kawakami; Japan |

=== Wheelchair athletes ===
| Class | Year | Gold | Silver | Bronze |
|---|---|---|---|---|
| Wheelchair A | 1968 | Gary Hooper; Australia | Bruno Moretti; Australia | Dick Thompson; Great Britain |
| Wheelchair B | 1968 | Kevin Munro; Australia | David Williamson; United States | Johann Schuhbauer; West Germany |
| Wheelchair C | 1968 | Gary Odorowski; United States | Denver Branum; United States | Miyawaza; Japan |
| 1A | 1984 | J. Lewellyn; United States | Rainer Küschall; Switzerland | H. Lobbering; West Germany |
| 1A | 1988 | Hans Lubbering; West Germany | Bart Dodson; United States | Rainer Küschall; Switzerland |
| 1B | 1984 | Leif Hedman; Sweden | Peter Schmid; Austria | T. Gehlert; Canada |
| 1B | 1988 | Peter Carruthers; Great Britain | Vincenzo Vallelonga; Australia | William Furbish; United States |
| 1C | 1984 | Eduardo Monsalvo; Mexico | Dino Wallen; United States | J. Hayes; United States |
| 1C | 1988 | Randy Dorman; United States | Andre Beaudoin; Canada | Theo Duyvestijn; Netherlands |
| 2 | 1972 | Gary Kerr; United States | Goldmann; United States | Barrett; Australia |
| 2 | 1976 | Gary Kerr; United States | Eusebio Valdez; Mexico | T. Rae; Great Britain |
| 2 | 1980 | Eusebio Valdez; Mexico | Gary Kerr; United States | G. M. Oviedo; Mexico |
| 2 | 1984 | Eusebio Valdez; Mexico | David McPherson; Australia | Jorge Luna; Mexico |
| 2 | 1988 | Errol Marklein; West Germany | Marc Quessy; Canada | Bob Gibson; United States |
| 3 | 1972 | Frank Jespers; Belgium | Josef Greil; Austria | Steuwe; United States |
| 3 | 1976 | Jim Hernandez; United States | Lars Lofstrom; Sweden | Charles Williams; Great Britain |
| 3 | 1980 | Lars Lofstrom; Sweden | Marc De Vos; Belgium | Chris Alp; Australia |
| 3 | 1984 | Marc De Vos; Belgium | Paul van Winkel; Belgium | J. Graciano; Brazil |
| 3 | 1988 | Robert Figl; West Germany | Lars Lofstrom; Sweden | Hong Duk Ho; South Korea |
| 4 | 1972 | Raymond Lewandowski; United States | Terry Giddy; Australia | Rolf Johansson; Sweden |
| 4 | 1976 | David Kiley; United States | Raymond Lewandowski; United States | Birger Nordh; Sweden |
| 4 | 1980 | B. Parks; United States | Rolf Johansson; Sweden | Richard Oliver; Australia |
| 4 | 1984 | Robert Courtney; New Zealand | Hans Schroder; West Germany | Ron Minor; Canada |
| 4 | 1988 | Yu Hee Sang; South Korea | Jan Kleinheerenbrink; Netherlands | Kim Byung Woo; South Korea |
| 5 | 1972 | B. Simpson; Canada | Gillette; United States | E. H. Roek; Netherlands |
| 5 | 1976 | Rolf Johansson; Sweden | Randy Wix; United States | E. H. Roek; Netherlands |
| 5 | 1980 | M. De Meyer; Belgium | M. Fitzgerald; Canada | Erich Hubel; Australia |
| 5 | 1984 | D. Barret; United States | Franz Nietlispach; Switzerland | Adel Sultan; Bahrain |
| 5-6 | 1988 | Lee Bong Ho; South Korea | Adel Sultan; Bahrain | Iranilson Loiveira Da Silva; Brazil |
| A1-3 | 1984 | Jim Martinson; United States | Kris Lenzo; United States | Gerry O'Rourke; Ireland |
| A1-3/A9/L2 | 1988 | Daniel Wesley; Canada | Mustapha Badid; France | Hakan Ericsson; Sweden |
| A2/A9 | 1988 | Todd Schaffhauser; United States | Kerrod McGregor; Australia | Andreas Siegl; Austria |
| A4 | 1984 | Kazmierz Suchocki; Poland | Jurgen Johann; West Germany | Joe Egan; Australia |
| A4/A9 | 1988 | Dennis Oehler; United States | Adrian Lowe; Australia | Robert Barrett; Great Britain |
| C2 | 1988 | David Osborn; United States | Mogens Justesen; Denmark | Darrin Jordan; Ireland |
| C3 | 1988 | Jamie Bone; Canada | Par Boman; Sweden | David Severin; Canada |
| C3-4 | 1992 | David Larson; United States | Ross Davis; United States | Joe Zuppanic; Canada |
| C4 | 1984 | Robert Easton; Canada | Jean Louis Janneay; France | Waymon Ware; United States |
| C4-5 | 1988 | Robert Easton; Canada | Michael Johner; Canada | David Larson; United States |
| C5 | 1984 | John Sacco; United States | Dean Houle; United States | Mark Kemp; United States |
| C5 | 1992 | Larry Banks; United States | Paul Hughes; Great Britain | Jaime Romaguera; Australia |
| D1 (wheelchairs) | 1980 | Jim Martinson; United States | C. Brinkman; United States | Walter Zierl; Austria |
| L2 | 1984 | Scott Schneider; United States | Patrick De Uylder; Belgium | Gary Stone; United States |
| L3 | 1984 | Hikan Eriksson; Sweden | Bill Lehr; United States | Keith Whiley; Great Britain |
| King of the Straight | 1984 | Marc De Vos; Belgium | D. Barret; United States | Robert Courtney; New Zealand |
| TW1 | 1992 | Bart Dodson; United States | Hans Lubbering; Germany | Giuseppe Forni; Switzerland |
| TW2 | 1992 | Paul Nitz; United States | Andre Beaudoin; Canada | Bradley Ramage; United States |
| TW3 | 1992 | Andrew Hodge; Great Britain | John Lindsay; Australia | Chris Hallam; Great Britain |
| TW4 | 1992 | Claude Issorat; France | Hakan Ericsson; Sweden | Robert Figl; Germany |
| T32 | 1996 | Lachlan Jones; Australia | Joseph Radmore; Canada | Paul Williams; Great Britain |
| T33 | 1996 | William Davis; United States | Gunnar Krantz; Sweden | David Larson; United States |
| T33 | 2016 | Ahmad Almutairi; Kuwait | Toby Gold; Great Britain | Andrew Small; Great Britain |
| T33 | 2020 | Andrew Small; Great Britain | Ahmad Almutairi; Kuwait | Harri Jenkins; Great Britain |
| T34 | 1996 | Suarez Nestor; Argentina | Jaime Romaguera; Australia | Paul Hughes; Great Britain |
| T34 | 2000 | Ross Davis; United States | Jason Lachance; Canada | Kazuya Maeba; Japan |
| T34 | 2012 | Walid Ktila; Tunisia | Rheed McCracken; Australia | Mohamed Hammadi; United Arab Emirates |
| T34 | 2016 | Walid Ktila; Tunisia | Rheed McCracken; Australia | Henry Manni; Finland |
| T34 | 2020 | Walid Ktila; Tunisia | Rheed McCracken; Australia | Mohamed Hammadi; United Arab Emirates |
| T51 | 1996 | Paul Nitz; United States | Andre Beaudoin; Canada | Dean Bergeron; Canada |
| T51 | 2012 | Toni Piispanen; Finland | Alvise de Vidi; Italy | Mohamed Berrahal; Algeria |
| T51 | 2016 | Peter Genyn; Belgium | Mohamed Berrahal; Algeria | Edgar Cesareo Navarro Sanchez; Mexico |
| T51 | 2020 | Peter Genyn; Belgium | Toni Piispanen; Finland | Roger Habsch; Belgium |
| T52 | 1996 | John Lindsay; Australia | Yasuhiro Une; Japan | Matthew Parry; United States |
| T52 | 2000 | Paul Nitz; United States | Salvador Hernandez Mondragon; Mexico | Andre Beaudoin; Canada |
| T52 | 2004 | Salvador Hernandez Mondragon; Mexico | Beat Bosch; Switzerland | Andre Beaudoin; Canada |
| T52 | 2008 | Dean Bergeron; Canada | Beat Bosch; Switzerland | Andre Beaudoin; Canada |
| T52 | 2012 | Raymond Martin; United States | Salvador Hernandez Mondragon; Mexico | Paul Nitz; United States |
| T52 | 2016 | Gianfranco Iannotta; United States | Raymond Martin; United States | Salvador Hernandez Mondragon; Mexico |
| T52 | 2020 | Raymond Martin; United States | Yuki Oya; Japan | Leonardo de Jesus Perez Juarez; Mexico |
| T53 | 1996 | David Holding; Great Britain | Hakan Ericsson; Sweden | Claude Issorat; France |
| T53 | 2000 | John Lindsay; Australia | Sopa Intasen; Thailand | Hamad Aladwani; Kuwait |
| T53 | 2004 | Hong Suk Man; South Korea | Hamad Aladwani; Kuwait | Joshua George; United States |
| T53 | 2008 | Joshua George; United States | Mickey Bushell; Great Britain | Yu Shiran; China |
| T53 | 2012 | Mickey Bushell; Great Britain | Zhao Yufei; China | Yu Shiran; China |
| T53 | 2016 | Brent Lakatos; Canada | Pongsakorn Paeyo; Thailand | Li Huzhao; China |
| T53 | 2020 | Pongsakorn Paeyo; Thailand | Brent Lakatos; Canada | Adbulrahman Alqurashi; Saudi Arabia |
| T54 | 2000 | Geoff Trappett; Australia | Hakan Ericsson; Sweden | David Holding; Great Britain |
| T54 | 2004 | Leo Pekka Tahti; Finland | David Weir; Great Britain | Kenny van Weeghel; Netherlands |
| T54 | 2008 | Leo Pekka Tahti; Finland | Saichon Konjen; Thailand | Supachai Koysub; Thailand |
| T54 | 2012 | Leo Pekka Tahti; Finland | Liu Yang; China | Saichon Konjen; Thailand |
| T54 | 2016 | Leo Pekka Tahti; Finland | Liu Yang; China | Kenny van Weeghel; Netherlands |
| T54 | 2020 | Athiwat Paeng-Nuea; Thailand | Leo Pekka Tahti; Finland | Juan Pablo Cervantes Garcia; Mexico |

== Women's medal summaries ==
=== Ambulant athletes ===
| Class | Year | Gold | Silver | Bronze |
|---|---|---|---|---|
| C | 1980 | Anne Farrell; Canada | Karen Gillis; Canada | Charmaine Cree; Australia |
| C1 | 1980 | Danuta Kozlak; Poland | Only one competitor | |
| C5-6 | 1992 | Caroline Innes; Great Britain | Cornelia Teubner; Germany | Kim Myung Ja; South Korea |
| C6 | 1988 | Zita Andrey; Switzerland | Marcia Malsar; Brazil | Sylvie Sauve; Canada |
| C7 | 1984 | Zita Andrey; Switzerland | Veronique Rochette; France | Theresa Ward; Ireland |
| C7 | 1988 | Theresa Ward; Ireland | Siw Kristin Vestengen; Norway | Leslie Roth; United States |
| C7-8 | 1992 | Alison Quinn; Australia | Esther Cruice; Great Britain | Maki Okada; Japan |
| C8 | 1984 | Toshiko Kobayashi; Japan | Deborah Hearn; United States | No bronze medalist |
| C8 | 1988 | Alma Rock; Ireland | Maki Okada; Japan | Camila McMahon; Ireland |
| T34-35 | 1996 | Caroline Innes; Great Britain | Maria Álvarez; Spain | Cornelia Teubner; Germany |
| T35 | 2012 | Liu Ping; China | Oxana Corso; Italy | Virginia McLachlan; Canada |
| T35 | 2016 | Zhou Xia; China | Isis Holt; Australia | Maria Lyle; Great Britain |
| T35 | 2020 | Zhou Xia; China | Isis Holt; Australia | Maria Lyle; Great Britain |
| T35 | 2024 | Zhou Xia; China | Guo Qianqian; China | Preethi Pal; India |
| T36 | 2000 | Hazel Robson; Great Britain | Caroline Innes; Great Britain | Yu Chun Lai; Hong Kong |
| T36 | 2004 | Wang Fang; China | Hazel Robson; Great Britain | Yuki Kato; Japan |
| T36 | 2008 | Wang Fang; China | Claudia Nicoleitzik; Germany | Hazel Simpson; Great Britain |
| T36 | 2012 | Elena Ivanova; Russia | Jeon Min Jae; South Korea | Claudia Nicoleitzik; Germany |
| T36 | 2016 | Yanina Martinez; Argentina | Claudia Nicoleitzik; Germany | Martha Liliana Hernández Florián; Colombia |
| T36 | 2020 | Shi Yiting; China | Elena Ivanova; RPC | Danielle Aitchison; New Zealand |
| T36 | 2024 | | | |
| T36-37 | 1996 | Katrina Webb; Australia | Isabelle Foerder; Germany | Alison Quinn; Australia |
| T37 | 2000 | Lisa McIntosh; Australia | Isabelle Foerder; Germany | Evelyne Khatsembula; Kenya |
| T37 | 2004 | Oksana Krechunyak; Ukraine | Isabelle Foerder; Germany | Lisa McIntosh; Australia |
| T37 | 2008 | Lisa McIntosh; Australia | Viktoriya Kravchenko; Ukraine | Maria Seifert; Germany |
| T37 | 2012 | Mandy Francois-Elie; France | Johanna Benson; Namibia | Neda Bahi; Tunisia |
| T37 | 2016 | Georgina Hermitage; Great Britain | Mandy Francois-Elie; France | Yescarly Medina; Venezuela |
| T37 | 2020 | Wen Xiaoyan; China | Jaleen Roberts; United States | Jiang Fenfen; China |
| T37 | 2024 | | | |
| T38 | 2000 | Alison Quinn; Australia | Katrina Webb; Australia | Inna Dyachenko; Ukraine |
| T38 | 2008 | Inna Dyachenko; Ukraine | Sonia Mansour; Tunisia | Margarita Koptilova; Russia |
| T38 | 2012 | Margarita Goncharova; Russia | Chen Junfei; China | Inna Stryzhak; Ukraine |
| T38 | 2016 | Sophie Hahn; Great Britain | Veronica Hipolito; Brazil | Kadeena Cox; Great Britain |
| T38 | 2020 | Sophie Hahn; Great Britain | Darian Faisury Jiménez; Colombia | Lindy Ave; Germany |
| T38 | 2024 | Karen Palomeque; Colombia | Lida-Maria Manthopoulou; Greece | Darian Faisury Jiménez; Colombia |

=== Amputee athletes ===
| Class | Year | Gold | Silver | Bronze |
|---|---|---|---|---|
| A4 | 1984 | Reinhild Moeller; West Germany | Karen Farmer; United States | Anne Farrell; Canada |
| A6 | 1984 | Petra Buddelmeyer; West Germany | Barbara Joscelyne; Great Britain | Paivi Kaunisto; Finland |
| A6/A8-A9/L4 | 1988 | Petra Buddelmeyer; West Germany | Jessica Sachse; West Germany | Lynette Wildeman; Canada |
| D | 1980 | Melody Williamson; United States | R. Kirby; United States | No bronze medalist |
| D1 | 1976 | P. Martin; United States | Only one competitor | |
| D1 | 1980 | Sarah Newland; Jamaica | Barbara Bedla; Poland | Alina Wieczorek; Poland |
| E | 1980 | Barbara Joscelyne; Great Britain | R. Rantala; Finland | Zofia Mielech; Poland |
| F | 1976 | Lina Franzese; Italy | Only one competitor | |
| F | 1980 | Hiromi Nobumoto; Japan | Krystyna Cwiklinska; Poland | No bronze medalist |
| F1 | 1980 | Giselle Cole; Canada | Lina Franzese; Italy | No bronze medalist |
| TS4 | 1992 | Jessica Sachse; Germany | Annely Ojastu; Estonia | Irina Leontiouk; Unified Team |
| T42 | 2008 | Perla Bustamante; Mexico | Annette Roozen; Netherlands | Christine Wolf; Australia |
| T42 | 2012 | Martina Caironi; Italy | Kelly Cartwright; Australia | Jana Schmidt; Germany |
| T42 | 2016 | Martina Caironi; Italy | Vanessa Low; Germany | Monica Contrafatto; Italy |
| T42-46 | 1996 | Annely Ojastu; Estonia | Jessica Sachse; Germany | Amy Winters; Australia |
| T44 | 2000 | Shea Cowart; United States | Sabine Wagner; Germany | Wang Juan; China |
| T44 | 2008 | April Holmes; United States | Marie-Amélie Le Fur; France | Wang Juan; China |
| T44 | 2012 | Marie-Amélie Le Fur; France | Marlou van Rhijn; Netherlands | April Holmes; United States |
| T44 | 2016 | Marlou van Rhijn; Netherlands | Irmgard Bensusan; Germany | Nyoshia Cain; Trinidad and Tobago |
| T46 | 2000 | Amy Winters; Australia | Anna Szymul; Poland | Iryna Leantsiuk; Belarus |
| T46 | 2004 | Amy Winters; Australia | Anna Szymul; Poland | Elena Chistilina; Russia |
| T46 | 2008 | Yunidis Castillo; Cuba | Elena Chistilina; Russia | Alicja Fiodorow; Poland |
| T46 | 2012 | Yunidis Castillo; Cuba | Nikol Rodomakina; Russia | Wang Yanping; China |
| T47 | 2016 | Deja Young; United States | Alicja Fiodorow; Poland | Teresinha Correia; Brazil |
| T47 | 2020 | Lisbeli Marina Vera Andrade; Venezuela | Brittni Mason; United States | Deja Young; United States |
| T47 | 2024 | | | |
| T63 | 2020 | Ambra Sabatini; Italy | Martina Caironi; Italy | Monica Graziana Contrafatto; Italy |
| T63 | 2024 | | | |
| T64 | 2020 | Marlene van Gansewinkel; Netherlands | Irmgard Bensusan; Germany | Marissa Papaconstantinou; Canada |
| T64 | 2024 | | | |

=== Blind athletes ===
| Class | Year | Gold | Silver | Bronze |
|---|---|---|---|---|
| B | 1976 | Reidun Laengen; Norway | Yasuko Takeuchi; Japan | Linda Bethel; Great Britain |
| B | 1980 | Grazyna Kozlowska; Poland | June Smith; United States | G. Madrid; Spain |
| B1 | 1984 | Purificacion Santamarta; Spain | Lori Bennett; United States | Joke van Rijswijk; Netherlands |
| B1 | 1988 | Purificacion Santamarta; Spain | Kim Bang Wol; South Korea | Rossella Inverni; Italy |
| B1 | 1992 | Purificacion Santamarta; Spain | Purificacion Ortiz; Spain | Tracey Hinton; Great Britain |
| B2 | 1984 | Malgorzata Zalenska; Poland | Anelise Hermany; Brazil | Ping Yali; China |
| B2 | 1988 | Raissa Jouravliova; Soviet Union | Adria Santos; Brazil | Rima Batalova; Soviet Union |
| B2 | 1992 | Adria Santos; Brazil | Rima Batalova; Unified Team | Beatriz Mendoza; Spain |
| B3 | 1984 | Beth Bishop; United States | Zhao Jihong; China | Carmen del Marquez; Mexico |
| B3 | 1988 | Zhao Jihong; China | Lesli Mancktelow; New Zealand | Helena Leja; Poland |
| B3 | 1992 | Marla Runyan; United States | Olga Churkina; Unified Team | Sharon Bolton; Great Britain |
| T10 | 1996 | Purificacion Santamarta; Spain | Adria Santos; Brazil | Raquel Diaz; Spain |
| T11 | 1996 | Beatriz Mendoza; Spain | Claire Brunotte; Germany | Maria Jose Alves; Brazil |
| T11 | 2004 | Adria Santos; Brazil | Wu Chunmiao; China | Paraskevi Kantza; Greece |
| T11 | 2008 | Wu Chunmiao; China | Terezinha Guilhermina; Brazil | Adria Santos; Brazil |
| T11 | 2012 | Terezinha Guilhermina; Brazil | Jerusa Santos; Brazil | Jhulia Santos; Brazil |
| T11 | 2016 | Libby Clegg; Great Britain; Guide: Chris Clarke | Zhou Guohua; China; Guide: Jia Dengpu | Liu Cuiqing; China; Guide: Xu Donglin |
| T11 | 2020 | Linda Patricia Perez Lopez; Venezuela | Liu Cuiqing; China | None |
| T11 | 2024 | | | |
| T12 | 2000 | Adria Santos; Brazil | Purificacion Santamarta; Spain | Beatriz Mendoza; Spain |
| T12 | 2004 | Assia El Hannouni; France | Volha Zinkevich; Belarus | Maria Jose Alves; Brazil |
| T12 | 2008 | Oxana Boturchuk; Ukraine | Libby Clegg; Great Britain | Eva Ngui; Spain |
| T12 | 2012 | Zhou Guohua; China | Libby Clegg; Great Britain | Oxana Boturchuk; Ukraine |
| T12 | 2016 | Omara Durand; Cuba; Guide: Yuniol Kindelan | Elena Chebanu; Azerbaijan; Guide: Hakim Ibrahimov | Katrin Mueller-Rottgardt; Germany; Guide: Sebastian Fricke |
| T12 | 2020 | Omara Durand; Cuba | Oxana Boturchuk; Ukraine | Liang Yanfen; China |
| T12 | 2024 | | | |
| T13 | 2004 | Olga Semenova; Russia | Anthi Karagianni; Greece | Ana Jimenez; Cuba |
| T13 | 2008 | Sanaa Benhama; Morocco | Ilse Hayes; South Africa | Alexandra Dimoglou; Greece |
| T13 | 2012 | Omara Durand; Cuba | Ilse Hayes; South Africa | Nantenin Keita; France |
| T13 | 2016 | Leilia Adzhametova; Ukraine | Ilse Hayes; South Africa | Kym Crosby; United States |
| T13 | 2020 | Adiaratou Iglesias Forneiro; Spain | Lamiya Valiyeva; Azerbaijan | Kym Crosby; United States |
| T13 | 2024 | | | |

=== Wheelchair athletes ===
| Class | Year | Gold | Silver | Bronze |
|---|---|---|---|---|
| 1A | 1984 | Martha Gustafson; Canada | M. Ferraz; Brazil | K. Holm; United States |
| 1B | 1984 | J. Mora; United States | P. Delevacque; France | Aida Sheshani; Jordan |
| 1C | 1984 | Tham Simpson; Canada | J. Gutierrez; Mexico | No bronze medalist |
| 1C | 1988 | Leticia Torres; Mexico | Yolande Hansen; West Germany | Mary Thompson; United States |
| 2 | 1984 | Ingrid Lauridsen; Denmark | Glee Lyford; United States | B. Moore; United States |
| 2 | 1988 | Francesca Porcellato; Italy | Brenda Zajac; United States | Dora Elia Garcia Estrada; Mexico |
| 3 | 1984 | Debbi Kostelyk; Canada | S. Hadfield; New Zealand | Sabrina Bulleri; Italy |
| 3 | 1988 | Sabrina Bulleri; Italy | Debbi Kostelyk; Canada | Lee Min Ok; South Korea |
| 4 | 1984 | Monica Saker; Sweden | Milena Balsamo; Italy | Lilia Harasimczuk; Poland |
| 4 | 1988 | Charla Ramsey; United States | Cecilia Vazquez; Mexico | Marie-Line Pollet; Belgium |
| 5 | 1984 | Martine Prieur; France | A. Orvefors; Sweden | Juana Soto; Mexico |
| 5-6 | 1988 | Martine Prieur; France; Juana Soto; Mexico | No silver medalist; tie for gold | Deahnne McIntyre; Australia |
| A1-3/A9/L2 | 1988 | Baek Min Ae; South Korea | Valerie Deconde; France | Linda Hamilton; Canada |
| A4/A9 | 1988 | Claude Poumerol; Canada | Reinhild Moeller; West Germany | Karin Gambal; Austria |
| C4 | 1984 | Merja Jaaroa; Sweden | Kimala Searcy; United States | Susan Stevenson; Great Britain |
| C5 | 1984 | Kathie Kessler; United States | Irene Larochelle; Canada | Sandy Morgan; Canada |
| L2 | 1984 | Wilma Lawrie; Great Britain | Terri Dixon; United States | No bronze medalist |
| L3 | 1984 | Twyanna Caldwell; United States | Only one competitor | |
| Queen of the Straight 1A-6 | 1984 | Monica Saker; Sweden | Martine Prieur; France | Ingrid Lauridsen; Denmark |
| TW2 | 1992 | Cristeen Smith; New Zealand | Florence Gossiaux; France | Leticia Torres; Mexico |
| TW3 | 1992 | Tanni Grey; Great Britain | Ingrid Lauridsen; Denmark | Colette Bourgonje; Canada |
| TW4 | 1992 | Louise Sauvage; Australia | Monica Wetterstrom; Sweden | Daniela Jutzeler; Switzerland |
| T32-33 | 1996 | Noriko Arai; Japan | Linda Mastandrea; United States | Sheila O'Neil; United States |
| T34 | 2000 | Noriko Arai; Japan | Rebecca Feldman; Australia | Deborah Brennan; Great Britain |
| T34 | 2004 | Chelsea Clark; Canada | Chelsea Lariviere; Canada | Deborah Brennan; Great Britain |
| T34 | 2012 | Hannah Cockroft; Great Britain | Amy Siemons; Netherlands | Rosemary Little; Australia |
| T34 | 2016 | Hannah Cockroft; Great Britain | Kare Adenegan; Great Britain | Alexa Halko; United States |
| T34 | 2020 | Hannah Cockroft; Great Britain | Kare Adenegan; Great Britain | Robyn Lambird; Australia |
| T34 | 2024 | Hannah Cockroft; Great Britain | Kare Adenegan; Great Britain | Lan Hanyu; China |
| T52 | 1996 | Leann Shannon; United States | Tanni Grey; Great Britain | Colette Bourgonje; Canada |
| T52 | 2000 | Ursina Greuter; Switzerland | Lisa Franks; United States | Florence Gossiaux; France |
| T52 | 2008 | Michelle Stilwell; Canada | Yamaki Tomomi; Japan | Teruyo Tanaka; Japan |
| T52 | 2012 | Marieke Vervoort; Belgium | Michelle Stilwell; Canada | Kerry Morgan; United States |
| T52 | 2016 | Michelle Stilwell; Canada | Kerry Morgan; United States | Marieke Vervoort; Belgium |
| T53 | 1996 | Chantal Petitclerc; Canada | Cheri Becerra; United States | Nicola Jarvis; Great Britain |
| T53 | 2000 | Tanni Grey-Thompson; Great Britain | Cheri Blauwet; United States | Francesca Porcellato; Italy |
| T53 | 2004 | Tanni Grey-Thompson; Great Britain | Francesca Porcellato; Italy | Angela Ballard; Australia |
| T53 | 2008 | Huang Lisha; China | Jessica Galli; United States | Ilana Duff; Canada |
| T53 | 2012 | Huang Lisha; China | Zhou Hongzhuan; China | Angela Ballard; Australia |
| T53 | 2016 | Huang Lisha; China | Zhou Hongzhuan; China | Angela Ballard; Australia |
| T53 | 2020 | Gao Fang; China | Zhou Hongzhuan; China | Samantha Kinghorn; Great Britain |
| T54 | 2000 | Cheri Becerra; United States | Chantal Petitclerc; Canada | Yvonne Sehmisch; Germany |
| T54 | 2004 | Chantal Petitclerc; Canada | Tatyana McFadden; United States | Manuela Schaer; Switzerland |
| T54 | 2008 | Chantal Petitclerc; Canada | Liu Wenjun; China | Dong Honjiao; China |
| T54 | 2012 | Liu Wenjun; China | Dong Hongjiao; China | Tatyana McFadden; United States |
| T54 | 2016 | Liu Wenjun; China | Tatyana McFadden; United States | Li Yingjie; China |
| T54 | 2020 | Zhou Zhaoqian; China | Amanda Kotaja; Finland | Cheri Madsen; United States |

== See also ==
- Athletics at the Olympics
- 100 metres at the Olympics
