= List of Paralympic medalists in the 200 metres =

The 200 metres sprint events began in 1976 Summer Paralympics where there were two categories for both men and women. Between the 2016 and 2020 Paralympics there was some new classifications added. Some amputees were moved from T42–T46 to T62–T66.

== Men's medal summaries ==
=== Ambulant athletes ===
Class	Year	Gold	Silver	Bronze
C2	1984	Mogens Justesen; Denmark	Tom Cush; United States	Edwin Moore; Great Britain
C3	1984	Erich Christ; West Germany	Per Boman; Sweden	Richard Simon; United States
C3-4	1992	David Larson; United States	Ross Davis; United States	Christopher Ridgway; United States
C5-6	1992	Kim Du-chun; South Korea	Eric Stenback; United States	Freeman Register; United States
C7	1984	Henrik Thomsen; Denmark	Michel Bapte; France	Haukur Gunnarsson; Iceland
C7	1992	Peter Haber; Germany	Kang Sung Kook; South Korea	Haukur Gunnarsson; Iceland
C8	1984	Antonio Carlos Martins; Portugal	Franz Hlozek; Austria	Reinaldo Jose Perier; Portugal
C8	1992	Frank Bruno; Canada	Son Hoon; South Korea	José Manuel González; Spain
MH	1996	Nigel Bourne; Great Britain	Tico Clawson; United States	Kenneth Colaine; Great Britain
T34-35	1996	Freeman Register; United States	Fernando Gomez; Spain	Kim Du-chun; South Korea
T35	2000	Lloyd Upsdell; Great Britain	Roman Dzyuba; Ukraine	Richard White; Great Britain
T35	2004	Teboho Mokgalagadi; South Africa	Jon Halldorsson; Iceland	Lloyd Upsdell; Great Britain
T35	2012	Iurii Tsaruk; Ukraine	Fu Xinhan; China	Hernan Barreto; Argentina
T35	2016	Ihor Tsvietov; Ukraine	Fabio da Silva Bordignon; Brazil	Hernan Barreto; Argentina
T35	2020	Dmitrii Safronov; RPC	Ihor Tsvietov; Ukraine	Artem Kalashian; RPC
T35	2024	Ihor Tsvietov; Ukraine	Dmitrii Safronov; Neutral Paralympic Athletes	Artem Kalashian; Neutral Paralympic Athletes
T36	1996	Mohamed Allek; Algeria	Peter Haber; Germany	Ahmed Hassan Mahmoud; Egypt
T36	2000	So Wa Wai; Hong Kong	Serhiy Norenko; Ukraine	Ahmed Saif Zaal Abu Muhair; United Arab Emirates
T36	2004	So Wa Wai; Hong Kong	Andriy Zhyltsov; Ukraine	Graeme Ballard; Great Britain
T36	2008	So Wa Wai; Hong Kong	Roman Pavlyk; Ukraine	Che Mian; China
T36	2012	Roman Pavlyk; Ukraine	So Wa Wai; Hong Kong	Ben Rushgrove; Great Britain
T37	1996	Stephen Payton; Great Britain	Douglas Amador; Brazil	Darren Thrupp; Australia
T37	2000	Mohamed Allek; Algeria	Matt Slade; New Zealand	Ahmed Hassan Mahmoud; Egypt
T37	2004	Matt Slade; New Zealand	Yang Chen; China	Mohamed Allek; Algeria
T37	2008	Fanie van der Merwe; South Africa	Sofiane Hamdi; Algeria	Ma Yuxi; China
T37	2012	Roman Kapranov; Russia	Shang Guangxu; China	Omar Monterola; Venezuela
T37	2020	Nick Mayhugh; United States	Andrey Vdovin; RPC	Ricardo Gomes de Mendonça; Brazil
T37	2024	Andrey Vdovin; Neutral Paralympic Athletes	Ricardo Gomes de Mendonça; Brazil	Christian Gabriel Costa; Brazil
T38	2000	Tim Sullivan; Australia	Mikhail Popov; Russia	Stephen Payton; Great Britain
T38	2004	Tim Sullivan; Australia	Farhat Chida; Tunisia	Zhou Wenjun; China
T38	2008	Evan O'Hanlon; Australia	Zhou Wenjun; China	Mykyta Senyk; Ukraine
T38	2012	Evan O'Hanlon; Australia	Dyan Buis; South Africa	Zhou Wenjun; China

=== Amputee athletes ===
Class	Year	Gold	Silver	Bronze
A1-3/A9/L2	1988	Mustapha Badid; France	Daniel Wesley; Canada	Hakan Ericsson; Sweden
A4/A9	1988	Dennis Oehler; United States	Adrian Lowe; Australia	Robert Barrett; Great Britain
A5/A7	1988	Jerzy Szlezak; Poland	Matthias Bergamo; West Germany	Qiu Xuewen; China
A6/A8/A9/L4	1988	Nigel Coultas; Great Britain	Harri Jauhiainen; Finland	Rodney Nugent; Australia
TS1	1992	Joe Gaetani; United States	Lukas Christen; Switzerland	Todd Schaffhauser; United States
TS2	1992	Tony Volpentest; United States	Neil Fuller; Australia	Dennis Oehler; United States
TS3	1992	Jerzy Szlezak; Poland	Pieter Badenhorst; South Africa	Jaroslaw Wisniewski; Poland
TS4	1992	Ajibola Adeoye; Nigeria	Nigel Coultas; Great Britain	Neil Louw; South Africa
T42	1996	Lukas Christen; Switzerland	Paul Gregori; France	Lothar Overesch; Germany
T42	2000	Lukas Christen; Switzerland	Earle Connor; Canada	Andriy Danylov; Ukraine
T42	2004	Wojtek Czyz; Germany	Clavel Kayitare; France	Heinrich Popow; Germany
T42	2012	Richard Whitehead; Great Britain	Shaquille Vance; United States	Heinrich Popow; Germany
T42	2016	Richard Whitehead; Great Britain	Ntando Mahlangu; South Africa	David Henson; Great Britain
T43-44	1996	Tony Volpentest; United States	Neil Fuller; Australia	Patrick Stoll; Switzerland
T44	2000	Neil Fuller; Australia	Roderick Green; United States	Marcus Ehm; Germany
T44	2004	Oscar Pistorius; South Africa	Marlon Shirley; United States	Brian Frasure; United States
T44	2008	Oscar Pistorius; South Africa	Jim Bob Bizzell; United States	Ian Jones; Great Britain
T44	2012	Alan Fonteles Cardoso Oliveira; Brazil	Oscar Pistorius; South Africa	Blake Leeper; United States
T44	2016	Liam Malone; New Zealand	Hunter Woodhall; United States	David Behre; Germany
T45-46	1996	Ajibola Adeoye; Nigeria	Geir Sverrisson; Iceland	Daniel Louw; South Africa
T46	2000	Sebastien Barc; France	Heath Francis; Australia	Tim Matthews; Australia
T46	2004	Antônio Souza; Brazil	Sebastien Barc; France	Heath Francis; Australia
T46	2008	Heath Francis; Australia	Antonis Aresti; Cyprus	Ettiam Calderon; Cuba
T46	2012	Yohansson Nascimento; Brazil	Raciel Gonzalez Isidoria; Cuba	Simon Patmore; Australia
T61	2020	Ntando Mahlangu; South Africa	Richard Whitehead; Great Britain	Ali Lacin; Germany
T64	2020	Sherman Isidro Guity Guity; Costa Rica	Felix Streng; Germany	Jarryd Wallace; United States
T64	2024	Sherman Isidro Guity Guity; Costa Rica	Levi Vloet; Netherlands	Mpumelelo Mhlongo; South Africa

=== Blind athletes ===
Class	Year	Gold	Silver	Bronze
B1	1992	Carlos Conceicao; Portugal	Julio Requena; Spain	Darren Collins; Australia
B2	1992	Marcelino Paz; Spain	Ingo Geffers; Germany	Omar Turro; Cuba
B3	1992	Uwe Mehlmann; Germany	Aldo Manganaro; Italy	Brian Pegram; United States
T10	1996	Julio Requena; Spain	Andrew Curtis; Great Britain	Jorge Llerena; Uruguay
T11	1996	Omar Moya; Cuba	Juan Antonio Prieto; Spain	Holger Geffers; Germany
T11	2000	Enrique Sanchez-Guijo; Spain	Firmino Baptista; Portugal	Julio Requena; Spain
T11	2004	Jose Armando Sayovo; Angola	Luis Bullido; Spain	Oleksandr Ivanyukhin; Ukraine
T11	2008	Lucas Prado; Brazil	Jose Armando Sayovo; Angola	Arian Iznaga; Cuba
T11	2012	Felipe Gomes; Brazil	Daniel Silva; Brazil	Jose Armando Sayovo; Angola
T11	2016	Ananias Shikongo; Namibia; Guide: Even Tjiviju	Felipe Gomes; Brazil; Guide: Jonas Silva	Daniel Silva; Brazil; Guide: Heitor de Oliveira Sales
T12	1996	Robert Jiménez; Dominican Republic	Aldo Manganaro; Italy	Arthur Lewis; United States
T12	2000	Gabriel Potra; Portugal	Li Qiang; China	Igor Pashchenko; Ukraine
T12	2004	Adekundo Adesoji; Nigeria	Matthias Schroeder; Germany	Ricardo Santana; Venezuela
T12	2008	Hilton Langenhoven; South Africa	Li Yansong; China	Yang Yuqing; China
T12	2012	Mateusz Michalski; Poland	Fedor Trikolich; Russia	Li Yansong; China
T12	2016	Leinier Savon Pineda; Cuba	Hilton Langenhoven; South Africa	Mahdi Afri; Morocco
T13	2000	Nathan Meyer; South Africa	Andre Andrade; Brazil	Ricardo Santana; Venezuela
T13	2004	André Andrade; Brazil	Nathan Meyer; South Africa	Irving Bustamante; Cuba
T13	2008	Jason Smyth; Ireland	Alexei Labzin; Russia	Vugar Mehdiyev; Azerbaijan
T13	2012	Jason Smyth; Ireland	Alexei Labzin; Russia	Artem Loginov; Russia

=== Wheelchair athletes ===
Class	Year	Gold	Silver	Bronze
1A	1984	Rainer Küschall; Switzerland	Bart Dodson; United States	H. Lobbering; West Germany
1A	1988	Hans Lubbering; West Germany	Gunther Obert; West Germany	Giuseppe Forni; Switzerland
1B	1984	J. Matsson; Sweden	Peter Schmid; Switzerland	Leif Hedman; Sweden
1B	1988	Serge Raymond; Canada	Jan-Owe Mattsson; Sweden	Bruce Froendt; United States
1C	1984	Dino Wallen; United States	Alan Dufty; Australia	J. Hayes; United States
1C	1988	Andre Beaudoin; Canada	Stuart Minifie; New Zealand	Darrell Ray; United States
2	1976	Eusebio Valdez; Mexico	Gary Kerr; United States	Carlo Jannucci; Italy
2	1980	Eusebio Valdez; Mexico	Gary Kerr; United States	G. M. Oviedo; Mexico
2	1984	Jorge Luna; Mexico	Paul Clark; Canada	David McPherson; Australia
2	1988	Errol Marklein; West Germany	Wolfgang Petersen; West Germany	Mike Nugent; Australia
3	1976	Jim Hernandez; United States	Charles Williams; United States	P. H. van der Vis; Netherlands
3	1980	Mike Nugent; Australia	Marc de Vos; Belgium	Chris Alp; Australia
3	1984	Marc de Vos; Belgium	Paul van Winkel; Belgium	H. Jansson; Sweden
3	1988	Lars Lofstrom; Sweden	Paul van Winkel; Belgium	Robert Figl; West Germany
4	1984	Ron Minor; Canada	Remi van Ophem; Belgium	Hans Schroder; West Germany
4	1988	Jan Kleinheerenbrink; Netherlands	Saúl Mendoza; Mexico	Aaron Gordian; Mexico
5	1984	Franz Nietlispach; Switzerland	D. Barret; United States	Tom Foran; United States
5-6	1988	Franz Nietlispach; Switzerland	Lee Bong Ho; South Korea	Jose Manuel Rios; Mexico
TW1	1992	Bart Dodson; United States	Giuseppe Forni; Switzerland	Hans Lubbering; Germany
TW2	1992	Shawn Meredith; United States	Richard Reelie; Canada	Andre Beaudoin; Canada
TW3	1992	John Lindsay; Australia	Marc Quessy; Canada	Luke Gingras; Canada
TW4	1992	Claude Issorat; France	Hakan Ericsson; Sweden	Robert Figl; Germany
T34	2000	Jason Lachance; Canada	Kazuya Maeba; Japan	Ross Davis; United States
T34	2012	Walid Ktila; Tunisia	Mohamed Hammadi; United Arab Emirates	Rheed McCracken; Australia
T51	1996	Dean Bergeron; Canada	Shawn Meredith; United States	Bradley Ramage; United States
T51	2000	Bart Dodson; United States	Mikkel Gaarder; Norway	Alvise De Vidi; Italy
T51	2004	Edgar Navarro; Mexico	Tim Johansson; Sweden	Alvise De Vidi; Italy
T51	2020	Toni Piispanen; Finland	Peter Genyn; Belgium	Roger Habsch; Belgium
T51	2024	Cody Fournie; Canada	Toni Piispanen; Finland	Peter Genyn; Belgium
T52	1996	Yasuhiro Une; Japan	John Lindsay; Australia	Wolfgang Petersen; Germany
T52	2000	Salvador Hernandez; Mexico	Andre Beaudoin; Canada	Dean Bergeron; Canada
T52	2004	Andre Beaudoin; Canada	Salvador Hernandez; Mexico	Beat Bosch; Switzerland
T52	2008	Dean Bergeron; Canada	Beat Bosch; Switzerland	Peth Rungsri; Thailand
T52	2012	Raymond Martin; United States	Tomoya Ito; Japan	Salvador Hernandez; Mexico
T53	1996	Claude Issorat; France	Hakan Eriksson; Sweden	David Holding; Great Britain
T53	2000	Pierre Fairbank; France	Christopher Waddell; United States	John Lindsay; Australia
T53	2004	Hong Suk Man; South Korea	Hamad Aladwani; Kuwait	Pichet Krungget; Thailand
T53	2008	Yu Shiran; China	Richard Colman; Australia	Hong Suk Man; South Korea
T53	2012	Li Huzhao; China	Brent Lakatos; Canada	Zhao Yufei; China
T54	2000	Supachai Koysub; Thailand	Claude Issorat; France	Hakan Ericsson; Sweden
T54	2004	Leo Pekka Tahti; Finland	Kenny van Weeghel; Netherlands	David Weir; Great Britain
T54	2008	Zhang Lixin; China	Saichon Konjen; Thailand	Leo Pekka Tahti; Finland

== Women's medal summaries ==
=== Ambulant athletes ===
Class	Year	Gold	Silver	Bronze
C2	1984	Laura Misciagna; Canada	Terri Feinstein; United States	Angela Davis; United States
C3	1984	Ans Bouwmeester; Netherlands	Elizabeth Fleming; United States	Elaine Hewitt; Canada
C6	1984	Marcia Malsar; Brazil	Amanda Kyffin; Great Britain	Loraine Charters; Great Britain
C7	1984	Veronique Rochette; France	Theresa Ward; Ireland	Anette Saeger; West Germany
C7	1988	Siw Kristin Vestengen; Norway	Maria Albertina Cabral; Portugal	Jacquelyn Payne; United States
C7-8	1992	Alison Quinn; Australia	Esther Cruice; Great Britain	Maki Okada; Japan
C8	1984	Brenda Woodcock; Great Britain	Toshiko Kobayashi; Japan	Only two competitors
C8	1988	Sylvie Bergeron; Canada	Tiffani McCoy; United States	Annette Saeger; West Germany
MH	1996	Sharon Rackham; Australia	Tracey Melesko; Canada	Lisa Llorens; Australia
T20	2000	Lisa Llorens; Australia	Sharon Rackham; Australia	Tracey Melesko; Canada
T34-37	1996	Katrina Webb; Australia	Isabelle Foerder; Germany	Alicia Martinez; Spain
T35	2012	Liu Ping; China	Oxana Corso; Italy	Virginia McLachlan; Canada
T35	2016	Zhou Xia; China	Isis Holt; Australia	Maria Lyle; Great Britain
T35	2020	Zhou Xia; China	Isis Holt; Australia	Maria Lyle; Great Britain
T35	2024	Zhou Xia; China	Guo Qianqian; China	Preethi Pal; India
T36	2000	Caroline Innes; Great Britain	Eleni Samaritaki; Greece	Yu Chun Lai; Hong Kong
T36	2004	Wang Fang; China	Hazel Robson; Great Britain	Eriko Kikuchi; Japan
T36	2008	Wang Fang; China	Claudia Nicoleitzik; Germany	Hazel Simpson; Great Britain
T36	2012	Elena Ivanova; Russia	Jeon Min-jae; South Korea	Claudia Nicoleitzik; Germany
T36	2016	Shi Yiting; China	Jeon Min-jae; South Korea	Claudia Nicoleitzik; Germany
T36	2020	Shi Yiting; China	Danielle Aitchison; New Zealand	Yanina Martinez; Argentina
T36	2024	Shi Yiting; China	Danielle Aitchison; New Zealand	Mali Lovell; Australia
T37	2004	Evgenia Trushnikova; Russia	Lisa McIntosh; Australia	Isabelle Foerder; Germany
T37	2008	Lisa McIntosh; Australia	Viktoriya Kravchenko; Ukraine	Maria Seifert; Germany
T37	2012	Johanna Benson; Namibia	Bethany Woodward; Great Britain	Maria Seifert; Germany
T37	2020	Wen Xiaoyan; China	Jiang Fenfen; China	Mandy Francois-Elie; France
T37	2024	Wen Xiaoyan; China	Nataliia Kobzar; Ukraine	Jiang Fenfen; China
T38	2000	Lisa McIntosh; Australia	Alison Quinn; Australia	Katrina Webb; Australia
T38	2008	Inna Dyachenko; Ukraine	Sonia Mansour; Tunisia	Margarita Koptilova; Russia
T38	2012	Chen Junfei; China	Margarita Goncharova; Russia	Inna Stryzhak; Ukraine

=== Amputee athletes ===
Class	Year	Gold	Silver	Bronze
A1-3	1984	Youlanda Barker; United States	Valene Deconde; France	Melody Williamson; United States
A1-3/A9/L2	1988	Baek Min Ae; South Korea	Valerie Deconde; France	Linda Hamilton; Canada
A4/A9	1988	Reinhild Moeller; West Germany	Claude Poumerol; Canada	Karin Gambal; Austria
A6/A8/A9/L4	1988	Petra Buddelmeyer; West Germany	Jessica Sachse; West Germany	Lynette Wildeman; Canada
TS4	1992	Jessica Sachse; Germany	Lioubov Malakhova; Unified Team	Irina Leontiouk; Unified Team
T42-46	1996	Amy Winters; Australia	Annely Ojastu; Estonia	Iryna Leantsiuk; Belarus
T44	2000	Shea Cowart; United States	Sabine Wagner; Germany	Wang Juan; China
T44	2008	Katrin Green; Germany	Kate Horan; New Zealand	Stefanie Reid; Canada
T44	2012	Marlou van Rhijn; Netherlands	Marie-Amelie le Fur; France	Katrin Green; Germany
T44	2016	Marlou van Rhijn; Netherlands	Irmgard Bensusan; Germany	Marie-Amelie le Fur; France
T46	2000	Amy Winters; Australia	Lioubov Vassilieva; Russia	Anna Szymul; Poland
T46	2004	Amy Winters; Australia	Anna Szymul; Poland	Elena Chistilina; Russia
T46	2008	Yunidis Castillo; Cuba	Alicja Fiodorow; Poland	Julie Smith; Australia
T46	2012	Yunidis Castillo; Cuba	Alicja Fiodorow; Poland	Anrune Liebenberg; South Africa
T47	2016	Deja Young; United States	Alicja Fiodorow; Poland	Li Lu; China
T47	2020	Lisbeli Vera Andrade; Venezuela	Brittni Mason; United States	Alicja Fiodorow; Poland
T47	2024	Anna Grimaldi; New Zealand	Brittni Mason; United States	Sasirawan Inthachot; Thailand
T64	2020	Marlene van Gansewinkel; Netherlands	Irmgard Bensusan; Germany	Kimberly Alkemade; Netherlands
T64	2024	Kimberly Alkemade; Netherlands	Marlene van Gansewinkel; Netherlands	Irmgard Bensusan; Germany

=== Blind athletes ===
Class	Year	Gold	Silver	Bronze
B1	1992	Purificacion Santamarta; Spain	Tracey Hinton; Great Britain	Purificacion Ortiz; Spain
B2	1992	Rima Batalova; Unified Team	Marsha Green; Australia	Beatriz Mendoza; Spain
B3	1992	Marla Runyan; United States	Olga Churkina; Unified Team	Sharon Bolton; Great Britain
T10	1996	Purificacion Santamarta; Spain	Adria Santos; Brazil	Maria Ligorio; Italy
T11	1996	Beatriz Mendoza; Spain	Claire Brunotte; Germany	Maria José Alves; Brazil
T11	2000	Adria Santos; Brazil	Maria Ligorio; Italy	Tracey Hinton; Great Britain
T11	2004	Wu Chunmiao; China	Adria Santos; Brazil	Purificacion Santamarta; Spain
T11	2008	Terezinha Guilhermina; Brazil	Wu Chunmiao; China	Jerusa Santos; Brazil
T11	2012	Terezinha Guilhermina; Brazil	Jerusa Santos; Brazil	Jia Juntingxian; China
T11	2016	Libby Clegg; Great Britain; Guide: Chris Clarke	Liu Cuiqing; China; Guide: Xu Donglin	Zhou Guohua; China; Guide: Jia Dengpu
T11	2020	Liu Cuiqing; China	Thalita Simplicio; Brazil	Jerusa Geber; Brazil
T11	2024	Jerusa Geber dos Santos; Brazil	Liu Cuiqing; China	Lahja Ishitile; Namibia
T12	2000	Volha Shuliakouskaya; Belarus	Beatriz Mendoza; Spain	Elena Zhdanova; Russia
T12	2004	Assia El Hannouni; France	Volha Zinkevich; Belarus	Maria José Alves; Brazil
T12	2008	Assia El Hannouni; France	Oxana Boturchuk; Ukraine	Eva Ngui; Spain
T12	2012	Assia El Hannouni; France	Zhou Guohua; China	Zhu Daqing; China
T12	2016	Omara Durand; Cuba; Guide: Yuniol Kindelan	Oxana Boturchuk; Ukraine; Guide: Volodymyr Burakov	Elena Chebanu; Azerbaijan; Guide: Hakim Ibrahimov
T12	2020	Omara Durand; Cuba	Oxana Boturchuk; Ukraine	Anna Kulinich-Sorokina; RPC
T12	2024	Omara Durand; Cuba	Alejandra Paola Pérez López; Venezuela	Simran Sharma; India
T13	2008	Sanaa Benhama; Morocco	Nantenin Keita; France	Alexandra Dimoglou; Greece

=== Wheelchair athletes ===
Class	Year	Gold	Silver	Bronze
1A	1984	Martha Gustafson; Canada	M. Ferraz; Brazil	K. Holm; United States
1B	1984	J. Mora; United States	P. Delevacque; France	Aida Sheshani; Jordan
1C	1984	Tham Simpson; Canada	J. Gutierrez; Mexico	Judy Zelman; Canada
1C	1988	Leticia Torres; Mexico	Yolande Hansen; West Germany	Jean Waters; United States
2	1976	Elisabeth Bisquolm; Switzerland	Concepcion Salguero; Mexico	Glee Lyford; United States
2	1980	Adelah Al-Romi; Kuwait	Patricia Hill; New Zealand	Glee Lyford; United States
2	1984	Ingrid Lauridsen; Denmark	Dora Elia Garcia Estrada; Mexico	B. Moore; United States
2	1988	Brenda Zajac; United States	Francesca Porcelatto; Italy	Ann Walters; United States
3	1976	Ellyn Boyd; United States	Karen Casper; United States	Emilie Schwarz; Austria
3	1980	Candace Cable; United States	Angeles Valdez; Mexico	Karen Casper; United States
3	1984	S. Hadfield; New Zealand	Debbi Kostelyk; Canada	Gabriele Beyer (Paralympian); West Germany
3	1988	Sabrina Bulleri; Italy	Patricia Durkin; United States	Sherry Ann Ramsey; United States
4	1984	Monica Saker; Sweden	Connie Hansen; Denmark	Chris de Craene; Belgium
4	1988	Cecilia Vazquez; Mexico	Marie-Line Pollet; Belgium	Charla Ramsey; United States
5	1984	A. Orvefors; Sweden	A. Ieretti; Canada	Martine Prieur; France
5-6	1988	Deahnne McIntyre; Australia	Juana Soto; Mexico	Jean Driscoll; United States
TW2	1992	Jean Waters; United States	Kristine Harder; Canada	Leticia Torres; Mexico
TW3	1992	Tanni Grey; Great Britain	Ingrid Lauridsen; Denmark	Patricia Durkin; United States
TW4	1992	Louise Sauvage; Australia	Monica Wetterstrom; Sweden	Chantal Petitclerc; Canada
T32-33	1996	Linda Mastandrea; United States	Noriko Arai; Japan	Mary Rice; Ireland
T34	2000	Debbie Brennan; Great Britain	Noriko Arai; Japan	Rebecca Feldman; Australia
T34	2004	Chelsea Clark; Canada	Debbie Brennan; Great Britain	Noriko Arai; Japan
T34	2012	Hannah Cockroft; Great Britain	Amy Siemons; Netherlands	Desiree Vranken; Netherlands
T51	1996	Cristeen Smith; New Zealand	Leticia Torres; Mexico	Ursina Greuter; Switzerland
T52	1996	Leann Shannon; United States	Tanni Grey; Great Britain	Colette Bourgonje; Canada
T52	2000	Lisa Franks; Canada	Teruyo Tanaka; Japan	Miki Yoda; Japan
T52	2004	Lisa Franks; Canada	Pia Schmid; Switzerland	Leticia Torres; Mexico
T52	2008	Michelle Stilwell; Canada	Yamaki Tomomi; Japan	Pia Schmid; Switzerland
T52	2012	Michelle Stilwell; Canada	Marieke Vervoort; Belgium	Kerri Morgan; United States
T53	1996	Chantal Petitclerc; Canada	Cheri Becerra; United States	Nicola Jarvis; Great Britain
T53	2000	Tanni Grey-Thompson; Great Britain	Madeleine Nordlund; Sweden	Cheri Blauwet; United States
T53	2008	Huang Lisha; China	Jessica Galli; United States	Zhou Hongzhuan; China
T53	2012	Huang Lisha; China	Angela Ballard; Australia	Zhou Hongzhuan; China
T54	2000	Chantal Petitclerc; Canada	Cheri Becerra; United States	Yvonne Sehmisch; Germany
T54	2004	Chantal Petitclerc; Canada	Manuela Schaer; Switzerland	Tatyana McFadden; United States
T54	2008	Chantal Petitclerc; Canada	Tatyana McFadden; United States	Manuela Schaer; Switzerland

== See also ==
- Athletics at the Olympics
- 200 metres at the Olympics
