= Athletics at the 2004 Summer Paralympics – Men's 200 metres T35–38 =

Men's 200m races for athletes with cerebral palsy at the 2004 Summer Paralympics were held in the Athens Olympic Stadium between 20 & 26 September. Events were held in four disability classes.

== T35 ==
Men's 200m T35 at the XII Paralympic Games
- Venue: Athens Olympic Stadium
- Dates: 26 September 2004
- Competitors: 7 from 6 nations
- Winning time: 26.80

Medalists
1st place, gold medalist(s)		Teboho Mokgalagadi	South Africa
2nd place, silver medalist(s)		Jón Halldórsson	Iceland
3rd place, bronze medalist(s)		Lloyd Upsdell	Great Britain

The T35 event consisted of a single race. It was won by Teboho Mokgalagadi, representing South Africa.

=== Final Round ===
26 Sept. 2004, 21:05

Rank	Athlete	Time	Notes
1st place, gold medalist(s)	Teboho Mokgalagadi (RSA)	26.80	PR
2nd place, silver medalist(s)	Jón Halldórsson (ISL)	27.27	
3rd place, bronze medalist(s)	Lloyd Upsdell (GBR)	27.82	
4	Hugues Quiatol (FRA)	29.21	
5	Juan Serrano (ESP)	31.94	
6	Ernesto Margni (ARG)	34.32	
	Richard White (GBR)	DNF	

== T36 ==
Men's 200m T36 at the XII Paralympic Games
- Venue: Athens Olympic Stadium
- Dates: 26 September 2004
- Competitors: 7 from 7 nations
- Winning time: 25.15

Medalists
1st place, gold medalist(s)		So Wa Wai	Hong Kong
2nd place, silver medalist(s)		Andriy Zhyltsov	Ukraine
3rd place, bronze medalist(s)		Graeme Ballard	Great Britain

The T36 event consisted of a single race. It was won by So Wa Wai, representing Hong Kong.

=== Final Round ===
26 Sept. 2004, 18:00

Rank	Athlete	Time	Notes
1st place, gold medalist(s)	So Wa Wai (HKG)	25.15	PR
2nd place, silver medalist(s)	Andriy Zhyltsov (UKR)	25.75	
3rd place, bronze medalist(s)	Graeme Ballard (GBR)	25.78	
4	Marcin Mielczarek (POL)	25.86	
5	Panagiotis Manetas (GRE)	26.06	
6	Che Mian (CHN)	26.16	
7	Ahmed Hassan (UAE)	26.62	

== T37 ==
Men's 200m T37 at the XII Paralympic Games
- Venue: Athens Olympic Stadium
- Dates: 20–21 September 2004
- Competitors: 13 from 11 nations
- Winning time: 24.85

Medalists
1st place, gold medalist(s)		Matt Slade	New Zealand
2nd place, silver medalist(s)		Yang Chen	China
3rd place, bronze medalist(s)		Mohamed Allek	Algeria

The T37 event consisted of 2 heats and a final. It was won by Matt Slade, representing New Zealand.

=== 1st Round ===
Qualified for next round

Heat 1

20 Sept. 2004, 10:10

Rank	Athlete	Time	Notes
1	Le Irvine de Kock (RSA)	24.98	Q
2	Mohamed Allek (ALG)	25.11	Q
3	Yang Chen (CHN)	25.36	Q
4	Lukasz Labuch (POL)	25.76	q
5	Benjamin Hall (AUS)	26.10	q
6	Jens Wiegmann (GER)	26.62	
7	Nasrullah Khan (PAK)	27.94	

Heat 2

20 Sept. 2004, 10:16

Rank	Athlete	Time	Notes
1	Matt Slade (NZL)	25.18	Q
2	Ali Qambar Al Ansari (UAE)	25.74	Q
3	Lu Yi (CHN)	26.13	Q
4	Lamouri Rahmouni (FRA)	26.15	
5	Zubair Khan (PAK)	31.58	
	Fares Hamdi (TUN)	DNF	

=== Final Round ===
21 Sept. 2004, 17:45

Rank	Athlete	Time	Notes
1st place, gold medalist(s)	Matt Slade (NZL)	24.85	
2nd place, silver medalist(s)	Yang Chen (CHN)	24.85	
3rd place, bronze medalist(s)	Mohamed Allek (ALG)	25.10	
4	Ali Qambar Al Ansari (UAE)	25.14	
5	Le Irvine de Kock (RSA)	25.24	
6	Lukasz Labuch (POL)	25.45	
7	Lu Yi (CHN)	25.81	
8	Benjamin Hall (AUS)	26.37	

== T38 ==
Men's 200m T38 at the XII Paralympic Games
- Venue: Athens Olympic Stadium
- Dates: 23–24 September 2004
- Competitors: 10 from 9 nations
- Winning time: 22.92

Medalists
1st place, gold medalist(s)		Tim Sullivan	Australia
2nd place, silver medalist(s)		Mohamed Farhat Chida	Tunisia
3rd place, bronze medalist(s)		Zhou Wenjun	China

The T38 event consisted of 2 heats and a final. It was won by Tim Sullivan, representing Australia.

=== 1st Round ===
Qualified for next round

Heat 1

23 Sept. 2004, 10:20

Rank	Athlete	Time	Notes
1	Tim Sullivan (AUS)	23.68	Q
2	Malcolm Pringle (RSA)	24.60	Q
3	Stephen Payton (GBR)	25.11	Q
4	Juan Ramon Carrapiso (ESP)	25.45	
5	Kim Young Min (KOR)	27.84	

Heat 2

23 Sept. 2004, 10:26

Rank	Athlete	Time	Notes
1	Zhou Wenjun (CHN)	23.74	Q
2	Mohamed Farhat Chida (TUN)	23.77	Q
3	Andriy Onufriyenko (UKR)	23.78	Q
4	Aristotelis Marinos (GRE)	24.03	q
5	Paul Benz (AUS)	24.95	q

=== Final Round ===
24 Sept. 2004, 17:00

Rank	Athlete	Time	Notes
1st place, gold medalist(s)	Tim Sullivan (AUS)	22.92	WR
2nd place, silver medalist(s)	Mohamed Farhat Chida (TUN)	23.37	
3rd place, bronze medalist(s)	Zhou Wenjun (CHN)	23.47	
4	Andriy Onufriyenko (UKR)	23.57	
5	Aristotelis Marinos (GRE)	23.61	
6	Malcolm Pringle (RSA)	23.76	
7	Paul Benz (AUS)	24.34	
8	Stephen Payton (GBR)	24.45	
