= Athletics at the 2004 Summer Paralympics – Men's 100 metres T35–38 =

Men's 100 metres competition

Men's 100m races for athletes with cerebral palsy at the 2004 Summer Paralympics were held in the Athens Olympic Stadium. Events were held in four disability classes.

== T35 ==
Men's 100m T35 at the XII Paralympic Games
- Venue: Athens Olympic Stadium
- Dates: 21–22 September 2004
- Competitors: 9 from 8 nations
- Winning time: 13.05

Medalists
1st place, gold medalist(s)		Teboho Mokgalagadi	South Africa
2nd place, silver medalist(s)		Jón Halldórsson	Iceland
3rd place, bronze medalist(s)		Li Weichun	China

The T35 event consisted of 2 heats and a final. It was won by Teboho Mokgalagadi, representing South Africa.

=== 1st Round ===
Qualified for next round

Heat 1

21 Sept. 2004, 21:05

Rank	Athlete	Time	Notes
1	Teboho Mokgalagadi (RSA)	13.07	WR Q
2	Jón Halldórsson (ISL)	13.30	Q
3	Richard White (GBR)	14.26	Q
4	Eric Flemming (CAN)	15.07	q
5	Ernesto Margni (ARG)	15.67	

Heat 2

21 Sept. 2004, 21:11

Rank	Athlete	Time	Notes
1	Li Weichun (CHN)	13.38	Q
2	Hugues Quiatol (FRA)	13.68	Q
3	Lloyd Upsdell (GBR)	13.70	Q
4	Juan Serrano (ESP)	15.34	q

=== Final Round ===
22 Sept. 2004, 20:50

Rank	Athlete	Time	Notes
1st place, gold medalist(s)	Teboho Mokgalagadi (RSA)	13.05	WR
2nd place, silver medalist(s)	Jón Halldórsson (ISL)	13.36	
3rd place, bronze medalist(s)	Li Weichun (CHN)	13.38	
4	Lloyd Upsdell (GBR)	13.61	
5	Hugues Quiatol (FRA)	13.83	
6	Richard White (GBR)	14.15	
7	Eric Flemming (CAN)	15.08	
8	Juan Serrano (ESP)	15.33	

== T36 ==
Men's 100m T36 at the XII Paralympic Games
- Venue: Athens Olympic Stadium
- Dates: 20–21 September 2004
- Competitors: 11 from 10 nations
- Winning time: 12.49

Medalists
1st place, gold medalist(s)		Andriy Zhyltsov	Ukraine
2nd place, silver medalist(s)		So Wa Wai	Hong Kong
3rd place, bronze medalist(s)		Che Mian	China

The T36 event consisted of 2 heats and a final. It was won by Andriy Zhyltsov, representing Ukraine.

=== 1st Round ===
Qualified for next round

Heat 1

20 Sept. 2004, 10:45

Rank	Athlete	Time	Notes
1	Graeme Ballard (GBR)	12.73	Q
2	Ahmed Hassan (UAE)	12.76	Q
3	So Wa Wai (HKG)	12.76	Q
4	Yusof Azman (SIN)	13.47	q
5	Mariusz Sobczak (POL)	13.65	

Heat 2

20 Sept. 2004, 10:51

Rank	Athlete	Time	Notes
1	Andriy Zhyltsov (UKR)	12.76	Q
2	Panagiotis Manetas (GRE)	12.78	Q
3	Che Mian (CHN)	12.78	Q
4	Marcin Mielczarek (POL)	12.88	q
5	Lai Heng Niam (MAS)	13.97	
6	Man Kit (MAC)	17.67	

=== Final Round ===
21 Sept. 2004, 17:00

Rank	Athlete	Time	Notes
1st place, gold medalist(s)	Andriy Zhyltsov (UKR)	12.49	PR
2nd place, silver medalist(s)	So Wa Wai (HKG)	12.51	
3rd place, bronze medalist(s)	Che Mian (CHN)	12.60	
4	Panagiotis Manetas (GRE)	12.64	
5	Ahmed Hassan (UAE)	12.79	
6	Graeme Ballard (GBR)	12.81	
7	Marcin Mielczarek (POL)	12.83	
8	Yusof Azman (SIN)	13.36	

== T37 ==
Men's 100m T37 at the XII Paralympic Games
- Venue: Athens Olympic Stadium
- Dates: 25–26 September 2004
- Competitors: 10 from 7 nations
- Winning time: 12.23

Medalists
1st place, gold medalist(s)		Yang Chen	China
2nd place, silver medalist(s)		Lukasz Labuch	Poland
3rd place, bronze medalist(s)		Darren Thrupp	Australia

The T37 event consisted of 2 heats and a final. It was won by Yang Chen, representing China.

=== 1st Round ===
Qualified for next round

Heat 1

25 Sept. 2004, 10:35

Rank	Athlete	Time	Notes
1	Yang Chen (CHN)	12.28	Q
2	Lukasz Labuch (POL)	12.30	Q
3	Ali Qambar Al Ansari (UAE)	12.58	Q
4	Kieran Ault (AUS)	12.66	q
5	Zubair Khan (PAK)	14.64	

Heat 2

25 Sept. 2004, 10:41

Rank	Athlete	Time	Notes
1	Le Irvine de Kock (RSA)	12.20	Q
2	Matt Slade (NZL)	12.22	Q
3	Darren Thrupp (AUS)	12.44	Q
4	Lu Yi (CHN)	12.86	q
5	Nasrullah Khan (PAK)	13.26	

=== Final Round ===
26 Sept. 2004, 20:35

Rank	Athlete	Time	Notes
1st place, gold medalist(s)	Yang Chen (CHN)	12.23	
2nd place, silver medalist(s)	Lukasz Labuch (POL)	12.29	
3rd place, bronze medalist(s)	Darren Thrupp (AUS)	12.52	
4	Le Irvine de Kock (RSA)	12.56	
5	Matt Slade (NZL)	12.57	
6	Ali Qambar Al Ansari (UAE)	12.63	
7	Kieran Ault (AUS)	12.75	
8	Lu Yi (CHN)	12.87	

== T38 ==
Men's 100m T38 at the XII Paralympic Games
- Venue: Athens Olympic Stadium
- Dates: 21–22 September 2004
- Competitors: 10 from 9 nations
- Winning time: 11.37

Medalists
1st place, gold medalist(s)		Tim Sullivan	Australia
2nd place, silver medalist(s)		Zhou Wenjun	China
3rd place, bronze medalist(s)		Mohamed Farhat Chida	Tunisia

The T38 event consisted of 2 heats and a final. It was won by Tim Sullivan, representing Australia.

=== 1st Round ===
Qualified for next round

Heat 1

21 Sept. 2004, 12:10

Rank	Athlete	Time	Notes
1	Zhou Wenjun (CHN)	11.75	Q
2	Andriy Onufriyenko (UKR)	11.83	Q
3	Aristotelis Marinos (GRE)	11.89	Q
4	Paul Benz (AUS)	12.16	q
5	Juan Ramon Carrapiso (ESP)	12.63	q

Heat 2

21 Sept. 2004, 12:16

Rank	Athlete	Time	Notes
1	Tim Sullivan (AUS)	11.63	Q
2	Mohamed Farhat Chida (TUN)	11.87	Q
3	Stephen Payton (GBR)	11.92	Q
4	Christer Lenander (SWE)	12.64	
5	Kim Young Min (KOR)	13.07	

=== Final Round ===
22 Sept. 2004, 20:05

Rank	Athlete	Time	Notes
1st place, gold medalist(s)	Tim Sullivan (AUS)	11.37	WR
2nd place, silver medalist(s)	Zhou Wenjun (CHN)	11.63	
3rd place, bronze medalist(s)	Mohamed Farhat Chida (TUN)	11.64	
4	Aristotelis Marinos (GRE)	11.70	
5	Stephen Payton (GBR)	11.76	
6	Andriy Onufriyenko (UKR)	11.82	
7	Paul Benz (AUS)	12.16	
8	Juan Ramon Carrapiso (ESP)	12.36	
