= Athletics at the 2004 Summer Paralympics – Men's 400 metres T36–38 =

Men's 400m races for athletes with cerebral palsy at the 2004 Summer Paralympics were held in the Athens Olympic Stadium. Events were held in three disability classes.

== T36 ==
Men's 400m T36 at the XII Paralympic Games
- Venue: Athens Olympic Stadium
- Dates: 23–24 September 2004
- Competitors: 10 from 9 nations
- Winning time: 55.28

Medalists
1st place, gold medalist(s)		Artem Arefyev	Russia
2nd place, silver medalist(s)		So Wa Wai	Hong Kong
3rd place, bronze medalist(s)		Marcin Mielczarek	Poland

The T36 event consisted of 2 heats and a final. It was won by Artem Arefyev, representing Russia.

=== 1st Round ===
Qualified for next round

Heat 1

23 Sept. 2004, 17:50

Rank	Athlete	Time	Notes
1	Artem Arefyev (RUS)	56.99	PR Q
2	Serhiy Norenko (UKR)	59.06	Q
3	Che Mian (CHN)	59.29	Q
4	Ahmed Hassan (UAE)	1:02.21	q
5	Lai Heng Niam (MAS)	1:08.85	

Heat 2

23 Sept. 2004, 17:57

Rank	Athlete	Time	Notes
1	Marcin Mielczarek (POL)	1:00.00	Q
2	He Cheng En (CHN)	1:00.63	Q
3	So Wa Wai (HKG)	1:01.32	Q
4	Malcolm Bennett (AUS)	1:02.69	q
5	Choi Yong Jin (KOR)	1:04.45	

=== Final Round ===
24 Sept. 2004, 17:55

Rank	Athlete	Time	Notes
1st place, gold medalist(s)	Artem Arefyev (RUS)	55.28	WR
2nd place, silver medalist(s)	So Wa Wai (HKG)	57.52	
3rd place, bronze medalist(s)	Marcin Mielczarek (POL)	57.66	
4	Che Mian (CHN)	57.88	
5	Serhiy Norenko (UKR)	58.63	
6	He Cheng En (CHN)	59.48	
7	Ahmed Hassan (UAE)	1:01.56	
8	Malcolm Bennett (AUS)	1:02.95	

== T37 ==
Men's 400m T37 at the XII Paralympic Games
- Venue: Athens Olympic Stadium
- Dates: 25 September 2004
- Competitors: 8 from 7 nations
- Winning time: 52.70

Medalists
1st place, gold medalist(s)		Oleksandr Driha	Ukraine
2nd place, silver medalist(s)		Yang Chen	China
3rd place, bronze medalist(s)		Ali Qambar Al Ansari	United Arab Emirates

The T37 event consisted of a single race. It was won by Oleksandr Driha, representing Ukraine.

=== Final Round ===
25 Sept. 2004, 20:15

Rank	Athlete	Time	Notes
1st place, gold medalist(s)	Oleksandr Driha (UKR)	52.70	WR
2nd place, silver medalist(s)	Yang Chen (CHN)	54.60	
3rd place, bronze medalist(s)	Ali Qambar Al Ansari (UAE)	55.53	
4	Lamouri Rahmouni (FRA)	56.17	
5	Le Irvine de Kock (RSA)	56.43	
6	Lu Yi (CHN)	58.16	
7	Benjamin Hall (AUS)	59.41	
8	Kang Sung Kook (KOR)	1:00.61	

== T38 ==
Men's 400m T38 at the XII Paralympic Games
- Venue: Athens Olympic Stadium
- Dates: 26–27 September 2004
- Competitors: 11 from 9 nations
- Winning time: 51.41

Medalists
1st place, gold medalist(s)		Tim Sullivan	Australia
2nd place, silver medalist(s)		Malcolm Pringle	South Africa
3rd place, bronze medalist(s)		Stephen Payton	Great Britain

The T38 event consisted of 2 heats and a final. It was won by Tim Sullivan, representing Australia.

=== 1st Round ===
Qualified for next round

Heat 1

26 Sept. 2004, 18:45

Rank	Athlete	Time	Notes
1	Tim Sullivan (AUS)	51.42	Q
2	Mohamed Farhat Chida (TUN)	52.74	Q
3	Stephen Payton (GBR)	53.64	Q
4	Derek Malone (IRL)	54.35	q
5	Zhou Wenjun (CHN)	54.58	
6	Juan Ramon Carrapiso (ESP)	59.18	

Heat 2

26 Sept. 2004, 18:52

Rank	Athlete	Time	Notes
1	Malcolm Pringle (RSA)	52.91	Q
2	Andriy Onufriyenko (UKR)	53.15	Q
3	Valeriy Stepanskoy (RUS)	53.45	Q
4	Paul Benz (AUS)	53.82	q
5	Jose Manuel Gonzalez (ESP)	59.35	

=== Final Round ===
27 Sept. 2004, 17:40

Rank	Athlete	Time	Notes
1st place, gold medalist(s)	Tim Sullivan (AUS)	51.41	
2nd place, silver medalist(s)	Malcolm Pringle (RSA)	51.51	
3rd place, bronze medalist(s)	Stephen Payton (GBR)	52.32	
4	Andriy Onufriyenko (UKR)	53.12	
5	Valeriy Stepanskoy (RUS)	53.19	
6	Mohamed Farhat Chida (TUN)	54.43	
7	Derek Malone (IRL)	54.84	
8	Paul Benz (AUS)	56.35	
