= Athletics at the 2004 Summer Paralympics – Men's 4 × 100 metre relay T35–T38 =

Men's 4x100m T35-38 at the XII Paralympic Games
- Venue: Athens Olympic Stadium
- Dates: 23 September 2004
- Competitors: 5
- Winning time: 46.73

Medalists
1st place, gold medalist(s)		Paul Benz; Darren Thrupp; Benjamin Hall; Tim Sullivan	Australia
2nd place, silver medalist(s)		Zhou Wenjun; Yang Chen; Lu Yi; Che Mian	China
3rd place, bronze medalist(s)		Andriy Onufriyenko; Serhiy Norenko; Oleksandr Driha; Andriy Zhyltsov	Ukraine

The Men's 4 × 100 m relay T35-38 for athletes with cerebral palsy at the 2004 Summer Paralympics was held in the Athens Olympic Stadium on 23 September. The event consisted of a single race, and was won by the team representing Australia.

== Final round ==
23 Sept. 2004, 12:05

Rank	Team	Time	Notes
1st place, gold medalist(s)	Australia	46.73	WR
2nd place, silver medalist(s)	China	46.86	
3rd place, bronze medalist(s)	Ukraine	47.52	
4	South Africa	49.09	
5	Czech Republic	53.04	

== Team Lists ==
Australia; Paul Benz; Darren Thrupp; Benjamin Hall; Tim Sullivan	China; Zhou Wenjun; Yang Chen; Lu Yi; Che Mian	Ukraine; Andriy Onufriyenko; Serhiy Norenko; Oleksandr Driha; Andriy Zhyltsov	South Africa; Malcolm Pringle; Fabian Michaels; Le Irvine de Kock; Teboho Mokgalagadi
Czech Republic; Petr Vratil; Aleš Švehlík; Miroslav Janecek; Roman Kolek
