= Athletics at the 1992 Summer Paralympics – Men's 100 metres C6 =

Men's 100 metres C6 at the IX Paralympic Games
- Paralympic Athletics
- Competitors: 9 from 5 nations

Medalists
1st place, gold medalist(s)		Freeman Register	United States
2nd place, silver medalist(s)		Du Chun Kim	South Korea
3rd place, bronze medalist(s)		Eric Stenback	United States

The Men's 100 metres C6 was a track event in athletics at the 1992 Summer Paralympics, for visually impaired athletes. It consisted of a single race.

== Results ==
=== Final ===
Place	Athlete	Time
1	Freeman Register (USA)	13:16
2	Du Chun Kim (KOR)	13:44
3	Eric Stenback (USA)	13:70
4	Marcelino Saavedra (ESP)	13:80
5	Jose Brizuela (ESP)	13:94
6	Gordon Robertson (GBR)	14:10
7	James Weidner (USA)	14:30
8	Rafael Gomez (ESP)	14:31
9	Fahed Al-Mutairi (KUW)	17:13
