= Kim Du-chun =

South Korean Paralympic athlete

Medal record

Track and field (athletics)

Representing South Korea

Paralympic Games
Gold medal – first place	1992 Barcelona	200 metres - C5-6
Gold medal – first place	1992 Barcelona	400 metres - C6
Gold medal – first place	1996 Atlanta	100 metres - T35
Gold medal – first place	1996 Atlanta	400 metres - T34-35
Silver medal – second place	1992 Barcelona	100 metres - C6
Bronze medal – third place	1996 Atlanta	200 metres - T34-35

- Kim Du-chun
- Hangul: 김두천
- RR: Gim Ducheon
- MR: Kim Tuch'ŏn

Kim Du-chun (Korean: 김두천; born 1968) is a paralympic athlete from South Korea competing mainly in category C6 sprint events.

Kim competed in four Paralympics winning six medals including four gold. He first competed in the 1988 Summer Paralympics where he finished fifth in the 100m, fourth in the 200m and fifth in the 400m. At the 1992 Summer Paralympics in Barcelona he finished second in the 100m behind the world record equalling run of American Larry Banks, and won gold in the 200m and 400m where he set a new Paralympic games record. In the 1996 Summer Paralympics he retained his title in the 400m in a new world record and despite American Freeman Register setting a new world record in the heats of the 100m, Kim beat him in the final to win the Gold medal but he was only able to win the bronze in the 200m. His final games came in 2000 where he finished sixth in the 100m, fourth in the 200m and 400m.
