= Athletics at the 1992 Summer Paralympics – Men's 100 metres C5 =

Men's 100 metres C3-4 at the IX Paralympic Games
- Paralympic Athletics
- Competitors: 6 from 5 nations

Medalists
1st place, gold medalist(s)		Larry Banks	United States
2nd place, silver medalist(s)		Paul Hughes	Great Britain
3rd place, bronze medalist(s)		Jaime Romaguera	Australia

The Men's 100 metres C5 was a track event in athletics at the 1992 Summer Paralympics, for visually impaired athletes. It consisted of a single race.

== Results ==
=== Final ===
Place	Athlete	Time
1	Larry Banks (USA)	13:95
2	Paul Hughes (GBR)	14:85
3	Jaime Romaguera (AUS)	15:37
4	Alberto Urruz (ESP)	15:77
5	Meteb Al-Shammari (KUW)	16:40
6	Hamish MacDonald (AUS)	16:57
