= Stadium Australia Hall of Fame =

Stadium Australia Hall of Fame was established in 2025 to commemorate the 25th anniversary of the Sydney 2000 Olympics opening ceremony at Stadium Australia. The Hall of Fame honours "the legends who have graced its grounds and created unforgettable moments since the venue first opened in 1999".

An independent judging panel of respected journalists, broadcasters, and sports administrators select Hall of Fame members.

== Hall of Fame ==
Year	Sport	Year
John Aloisi	Football	2025
John Eales AM	Rugby union	2025
Brad Fittler	Rugby league	2025
Cathy Freeman OAM	Athletics	2025
Andrew Johns	Rugby league	2025
Louise Sauvage OAM	Para athletics	2025
Tim Sullivan OAM	Para athletics	2025
Mark Schwarzer OAM	Football	2025
Ian Thorpe AM	Swimming	2025
Jonny Wilkinson	Rugby union	2025
