= Athletics at the 2000 Summer Paralympics – Men's 100 metres T35 =

Men's 100 metres T35 at the XI Paralympic Games
- Venue: Stadium Australia
- Competitors: 7 from 6 nations
- Winning time: 13.46

Medalists
1st place, gold medalist(s)		Lloyd Upsdell	Great Britain
2nd place, silver medalist(s)		Roman Dzyuba	Ukraine
3rd place, bronze medalist(s)		Richard White	Great Britain

The men's 100 metres T35 took place in Stadium Australia.

There were no preliminary rounds; only a final round was held. The T35 is for athletes who have coordination impairments such as hypertonia, ataxia and athetosis.

== Final round ==
Rank	Athlete	Time	Notes
1st place, gold medalist(s)	Lloyd Upsdell (GBR)	13.46	
2nd place, silver medalist(s)	Roman Dzyuba (UKR)	13.88	
3rd place, bronze medalist(s)	Richard White (GBR)	14.06	
4	Hugues Quiatol (FRA)	14.07	
5	Ernesto Margni (ARG)	15.31	
6	Michal Duffek (CZE)	16.09	
7	Hamish MacDonald (AUS)	17.04	
