= Paul Hughes (athlete) =

British Paralympic athlete

Medal record

Men's para-athletics

Representing United Kingdom

Paralympic Games
Silver medal – second place	1992 Barcelona	100 metres – C5
Bronze medal – third place	1996 Atlanta	100 metres – T34

Paul Hughes is a paralympic athlete from Great Britain competing mainly in category C5 sprint events.

Paul competed in both the 1992 and 1996 Summer Paralympics. In the 1992 games he failed to qualify for the final of the 200 m but won a silver medal in the 100 m behind American Larry Banks who set a new world record. In the 1996 games he finished third in the 100 m winning the bronze medal.
