= Jón Halldórsson (athlete, born 1982) =

Icelandic Paralympic athlete

Medal record

Track and field (athletics)

Representing Iceland

Paralympic Games
Silver medal – second place	2004 Athens	100 metres - T35
Silver medal – second place	2004 Athens	200 metres - T35

Jón Halldórsson is a Paralympic athlete from Iceland competing mainly in category T35 sprint events. Jon won the silver medal in both the 100m and 200m at the 2004 Summer Paralympics, in both events being beaten South Africa's Teboho Mokgalagadi. He also finished behind Tegoho in the 2008 Summer Paralympics 100m when Teboho finished third and Jon finished fifth.

Jón Halldórsson was also the name of a competitor in 1912.
