= Li Weichun =

Chinese Paralympic athlete

Medal record

Paralympic athletics

Representing China

Paralympic Games
Bronze medal – third place	2004 Athens	100 metres - T35

Li Weichun is a paralympic athlete from China competing mainly in category T/F35 javelin and sprint events.

Li competed in the javelin and 100m at the 2004 Summer Paralympics winning the bronze medal in the later.
