= Debbi Kostelyk =

Canadian Paralympic athlete

Debbi " Do Anything" Kostelyk
Personal information
- Nationality: Canada
- Born: April 8, 1961 (age 65) Edmonton, Alberta

Sport
- Sport: Athletics
Medal record
Representing Canada
Paralympic Games
Athletics
Gold medal – first place	1984 New York / Stoke Mandeville	Women's 100 m 3
Gold medal – first place	1984 New York / Stoke Mandeville	Women's 400 m 3
Silver medal – second place	1984 New York / Stoke Mandeville	Women's 200 m 3
Silver medal – second place	1988 Seoul	Women's 100 m 3

Debbi Kostelyk (born April 8, 1961, in Edmonton, Alberta) is a Paralympic athlete from Canada competing mainly in category 3 events.

Kostelyk competed in the 1984 Summer Paralympics in athletics, winning gold medals in the Women's 100 metres and 400 metres, as well as silver in the 200 metres. In the 1988 Summer Paralympics, she won silver in the 100 metres.
