= Eric Stenback =

American Paralympic athlete

Medal record

Track and field (athletics)

Representing United States

Paralympic Games
Silver medal – second place	1992 Barcelona	200 metres - C5-6
Bronze medal – third place	1992 Barcelona	100 metres - C6
Bronze medal – third place	1992 Barcelona	400 metres - C6

Eric Stenback is a paralympic athlete from the United States competing mainly in category C6 sprint events.

Eric competed in three Paralympic games, across a wide variety of track and field events winning a total of three medals. His first games in 1988 Summer Paralympics saw him compete in the 100m finishing sixth, 400m also finishing sixth, 3000m cross country finishing last in eighth and finishing fourth in the long jump. In the 1992 Summer Paralympics Eric concentrated in the sprints, winning bronze in the 100m, silver in the 200m and bronze in the 400m. His last games were in 1996 were Eric finished eighth in the 100m, failed to reach the final of the 400m and finished eleventh in the discus.
