= Yang Chen (parathlete) =

Paralympic athlete of China

Personal information
- Born: 29 January 1989 (age 37) Tianjin, China

Sport
- Sport: Paralympic athletics
Medal record
Paralympic athletics
Representing China
Paralympic Games
| Gold medal – first place | 2004 Athens | 100m T37 |
| Silver medal – second place | 2004 Athens | 200m T37 |
| Silver medal – second place | 2004 Athens | 400m T37 |
| Silver medal – second place | 2004 Athens | 4x100m T35-38 |
| Silver medal – second place | 2004 Athens | 4x400m T35-38 |
| Silver medal – second place | 2008 Beijing | 4x100m T35-38 |
World Para Athletics Championships
| Gold medal – first place | 2006 Assen | 100m T37 |
| Gold medal – first place | 2006 Assen | 400m T37 |
| Bronze medal – third place | 2006 Assen | 200m T37 |
| Bronze medal – third place | 2006 Assen | 4x100m relay T35-38 |
| Bronze medal – third place | 2006 Assen | 4x400m relay T35-38 |
Asian Para Games
| Gold medal – first place | 2010 Guangzhou | 4x100m relay T35-38 |
| Silver medal – second place | 2010 Guangzhou | 100m T38 |
| Silver medal – second place | 2010 Guangzhou | 200m T38 |
| Silver medal – second place | 2010 Guangzhou | 400m T38 |

Yang Chen (Chinese: 杨晨, born 29 January 1989 in Tianjin) is a Paralympian athlete from China competing mainly in category T37 sprint events.

== Biography ==
Yang Chen competed in the 2004 Summer Paralympics in Athens, Greece. He won a gold medal in the T37 100m and silver medals in the T37 200m, T37 400m and was part of the Chinese relay teams that won silver medals in both the T35-38 4 × 100 m and 4 × 400 m relays. When the Paralympics took place in 2008 in his home country Yang Chen was not quite as busy only competing in the 200m and as part of the 4 × 100 m T35-38 team that won a silver medal.
