= Ali Al Ansari =

United Arab Emirati Paralympic athlete

Medal record

Track and field (athletics)

Representing United Arab Emirates

Paralympic Games
Bronze medal – third place	2004 Athens	400 metres - T37

Ali Qambar Al Ansari is a paralympic athlete from United Arab Emirates competing mainly in category T37 sprint events.

Ali competed in the 100m, 200m and 400m in the 2000 and 2004 Summer Paralympics. Although he did not win any medals in the 2000 games he did win the bronze medal in the T37 400m in 2004.
