= Lamouri Rahmouni =

French Paralympic athlete

Medal record

Men's para athletics

Representing France

Paralympic Games
Silver medal – second place	1996 Atlanta	400 metres - T36
Silver medal – second place	2000 Sydney	4x400 metre relay - T38
Bronze medal – third place	2000 Sydney	400 metres - T37

Lamouri Rahmouni is a paralympic athlete from France competing mainly in category T37 sprint events.

Lamouri has competed in four paralympics winning a total of three medals in two of those games. His two unsuccessful games were his first and last, 1992 when he competed in the 400m, 800m and 1500m and the 2004 where he competed in the 200m, 400m and 800m. In 1996 he competed in the 800m and won a silver in the 400m. This silver turned to bronze in the 2000 Summer Paralympics where he also won a silver as part of the French 4 × 100 m relay team.
