= Łukasz Labuch =

Polish Paralympic athlete

Medal record

Paralympic athletics

Representing Poland

Paralympic Games
Silver medal – second place	2004 Athens	100 metres - T37

Lukasz Labuch is a Paralympic athlete from Poland competing mainly in category T37 sprint events.

Lukasz competed in the 2004 Summer Paralympics winning a silver medal in the T37 100m, he also finished fourth in the 200m and eighth in the long jump.
