= Maki Okada =

Japanese Paralympic athlete

Medal record

Paralympic athletics

Representing Japan

Paralympic Games
Gold medal – first place	1988 Seoul	400 metres - C8
Gold medal – first place	1988 Seoul	800 metres - C8
Silver medal – second place	1988 Seoul	100 metres - C8
Silver medal – second place	1992 Barcelona	400 metres - C7-8
Bronze medal – third place	1992 Barcelona	100 metres - C7-8
Bronze medal – third place	1992 Barcelona	200 metres - C7-8

Maki Okada (岡田 真紀, Okada Maki) is a Paralympic athlete from Japan competing mainly in category C8 sprint events.

Okada competed in both the 1988 and 1992 Summer Paralympics. In the 1988 games she won the 400m gold medal in a world record time of 1 minute 13.40. She also won the gold medal in the 800m and it took a Paralympic record from Irish sprinter Alma Rock to beat her into silver in the 100m. She also finished in fifth place in the 200m. In the 1992 Paralympics it took another world record by British sprinter Esther Cruice to beat her in the 400m while in both the 100m and 200m she finished behind Australian Alison Quinn and Esther to win the bronze medals.
