= Linda Mastandrea =

American Paralympic athlete and attorney

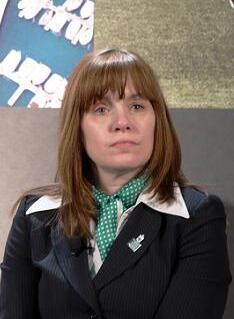

Personal information
- Born: Chicago, Illinois, United States
- Home town: Bolingbrook, Illinois
- Education: University of Illinois; Chicago-Kent College of Law

Sport
- Country: United States
- Sport: Paralympic athletics
- Disability: Spastic diplegia
- Disability class: T34
Medal record
Paralympic athletics
Representing United States
Paralympic Games
Gold medal – first place	1996 Atlanta	200m T32-33
Silver medal – second place	1996 Atlanta	100m T32-33
World Championships
Gold medal – first place	1994 Berlin	200m T33
Gold medal – first place	1994 Berlin	400m T33
Gold medal – first place	1998 Birmingham	200m T34
Silver medal – second place	1998 Birmingham	100m T34
Silver medal – second place	1998 Birmingham	400m T34

Linda Mastandrea is a civil rights and disability attorney, author and former Paralympic athlete. She was a Paralympic and World champion in wheelchair racing.

== Early life ==
Linda is the youngest twin in a second set of twins, her twin sister is Laura. She and Laura have older twin siblings and they have a younger brother. Linda was diagnosed with spastic diplegia cerebral palsy at a very young age when she found walking difficult and was often carried around.

== Sporting career ==
Mastandrea represented the United States in the 1990s, she participated at the 1996 Summer Paralympics, three World Para Athletics Championships, Parapan American Games and the Stoke Mandeville Wheelchair Games winning a total of twenty medals, she had also set national, world and Paralympic records during her career. In 2010, she was the first female Paralympic athlete to be inducted into the National Italian American Sports Hall of Fame.

In 2009, Mastandrea participated in the Chicago 2016 Olympic and Paralympic Games bid trying to win the rights to host the 2016 Summer Olympics where she worked alongside the-then President Barack Obama, First Lady Michelle Obama and mayor of Chicago Richard M. Daley. The 2016 Games were eventually won by Rio de Janeiro.
