= Yasuhiro Une =

Japanese Paralympic athlete

Medal record

Paralympic athletics

Representing Japan

Paralympic Games
Gold medal – first place	1996 Atlanta	200 metres - T52
Silver medal – second place	1996 Atlanta	100 metres - T52

Yasuhiro Une (畝 康弘, Une Yasuhiro) is a paralympic athlete from Japan competing mainly in category T52 sprinting events.

Yasuhiro competed in the 1996 Summer Paralympics where he won gold in the 200m and silver in the 100m.
