= Ajibola Adeoye =

Nigerian Paralympic athlete

Medal record

Track and field (athletics)

Representing Nigeria

Paralympic Games
Gold medal – first place	1992 Barcelona	100 metres - TS4
Gold medal – first place	1992 Barcelona	200 metres - TS4
Gold medal – first place	1996 Atlanta	100 metres - T45-46
Gold medal – first place	1996 Atlanta	200 metres - T45-46
Silver medal – second place	1996 Atlanta	Long Jump - F45-46

Adeoye Ajibola is a paralympic athlete from Nigeria competing mainly in category TS4 sprint events.

Adeoye attended Saka Tinubu Secondary School, Agege in the '80s. representing the school at inter-house sports events. He is his mother's first child. His siblings are Bisi, Segun, Dupe, Samson, Buki, and Sola He was married with children. He competed in the 100m, 200m, and long jump at both the 1992 and 1996 Summer Paralympics. At the 1992 games, he didn't start the long jump competition but did break the world record in both the 100m and 200m to win gold in both events. At the 1996 Summer Paralympics he defended both sprint titles and won a silver medal in the long jump.
