= Shea Cowart =

American Paralympic sprinter

Medal record

Track and field (T44)

Representing United States

Paralympic Games
Gold medal – first place	2000 Sydney	100 m - T44
Gold medal – first place	2000 Sydney	200 m - T44

Shea Cowart is an American sprinter and winner of two gold medals at the 2000 Summer Paralympics.

At age six she contracted meningococcemia, which resulted in both of her legs being amputated below the knee. At the 2000 Summer Paralympics, she won a gold medal and broke the world record in the women's T44 class 100 m race, and won another gold in the T44 200 m event.
