= Roman Dzyuba =

Ukrainian Paralympic athlete (born 1979)

Medal record

Paralympic athletics

Representing Ukraine

Paralympic Games
| Silver medal – second place | 2000 Sydney | 100 metres - T35 |
| Silver medal – second place | 2000 Sydney | 200 metres - T35 |

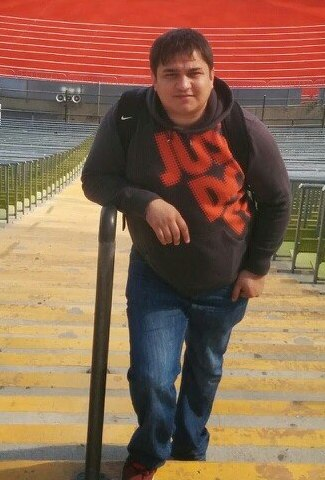
Roman Dzyuba

Roman Dzyuba (born June 8, 1979) is a paralympic athlete from Ukraine competing mainly in category T35 sprint events.

Roman won two silver medals at the 2000 Summer Paralympics in the T35 100m and 200m.
