= Darren Thrupp =

Australian Paralympic athlete

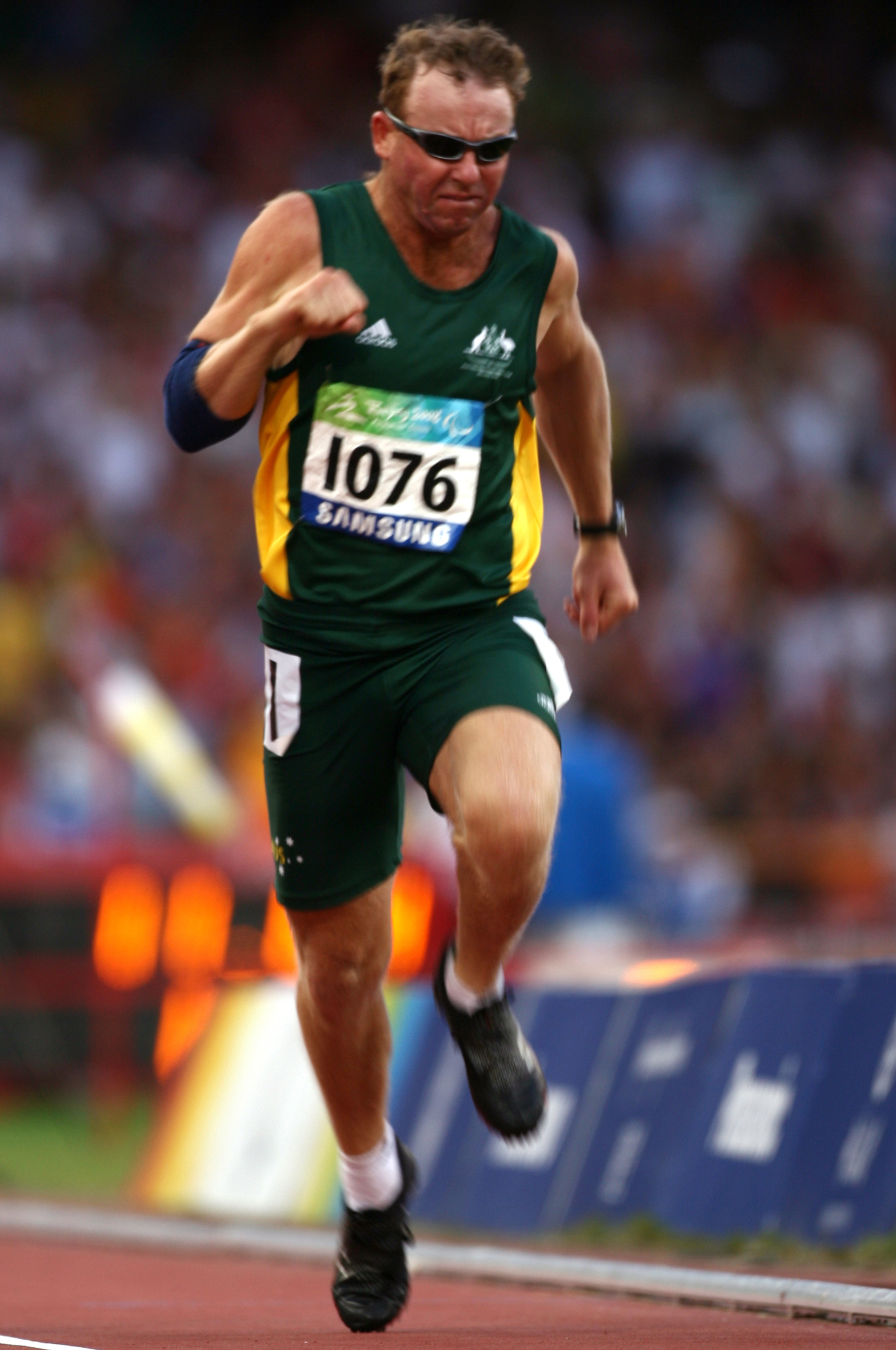
- Thrupp competing in the 100 m T37 final at the 2008 Beijing Paralympics

Personal information
- Full name: Darren Brian Thrupp
- Nationality: Australia
- Born: 6 December 1966 (age 59) Kilcoy, Queensland
Medal record
Men's para athletics
Representing Australia
Paralympic Games
Gold medal – first place	1992 Barcelona	Long Jump – C7–8
Gold medal – first place	1996 Atlanta	Long Jump – F34–37
Gold medal – first place	2000 Sydney	4x100 m – T38
Gold medal – first place	2000 Sydney	4x400 m – T38
Gold medal – first place	2004 Athens	4x100 m – T35–38
Gold medal – first place	2008 Beijing	4x100 m – T35–38
Bronze medal – third place	1996 Atlanta	200 metres – T37
Bronze medal – third place	2004 Athens	100 metres – T37
Bronze medal – third place	2004 Athens	Long Jump – F36–38
World Championships and Games for the Disabled
Gold medal – first place	1990 Assen	Long Jump C8
Silver medal – second place	1990 Assen	100 m C8
IPC Athletics World Championships
Gold medal – first place	1994 Berlin	Long Jump F37
Gold medal – first place	1998 Birmingham	Long Jump F38
Gold medal – first place	2002 Lille	4x100 m T35–38
Gold medal – first place	2002 Lille	4x400 m T35–38
Gold medal – first place	2006 Assen	Long Jump F37
Gold medal – first place	2006 Assen	4x100 m T35–38
Bronze medal – third place	2006 Assen	100 m T37

Darren Brian Thrupp, OAM (born 6 December 1966) is an Australian Paralympic athlete competing mainly in category T37 sprint events. He has won nine medals at six Paralympics.

== Biography ==
Thrupp was born in the Queensland town of Kilcoy. He acquired a brain injury in a car accident on a dusty Queensland road in February 1985 on the way home from a cricket match against Surat. The accident affected the right side of his body, in a way similar to hemiplegic cerebral palsy. Before the accident, like many young men from country Queensland, he was involved in running, cricket and playing A-grade rugby league for the Wallumbilla Herefords. He was looking forward to a rugby league career. The people of Roma encouraged him to take up athletics. In 1987, he attended a Sporting Wheelies "come and try" day and his times qualified him for the 1988 Seoul Games. His confidence was also assisted by being offered at job at the Roma Railway Station freight shed.

Thrupp has highlighted the tremendous support of the country people of Wallumbilla and Roma in his rehabilitation and their financial support to allow him to attend many international competitions. In 1989, the community raised $6,000 to allow him to compete in a major competition Japan. He credits this support for assisting him to win a gold medal at 1992 Barcelona Games

During his career, Thrupp has trained on his own in the bush around Wallumbilla. His coaches have been in Brisbane. These have included Jo Hogan and since 2001 Gary Bourne. From 1994 to 1995, he had both an Australian Institute of Sport Athletics with a Disability non-residential scholarship and a Queensland Academy of Sport scholarship.

He works as a porter.

== Competitive career ==
=== Paralympic Games ===
Thrupp has competed at six Paralympics. His first Games were the 1988 Seoul Paralympics, where he competed in three events – 100 m, 200 m and 400 m C8 events. Thrupp stated "I have to admit that I was completely overawed by the Paralympics in Seoul. There I was a bloke from outback Queensland, running in front of 100,000 people, so in my event I ran too hard early on and missed out".

In the 1992 Barcelona Games, he won a gold medal in the men's long jump C7–8, for which he received a Medal of the Order of Australia. He also competed in the men's 100 m, 200 m and 400 m C8 events. Thrupp followed this up in the 1996 Atlanta Games with a men's long jump F34–37 gold and a bronze in the 200 m T37. In 2000, he received an Australian Sports Medal. That year, in the 2000 Sydney Paralympics, he was a part of the winning men's 4x100 m and 4x400 m T35–38 relay teams. At these Games, he also competed in the men's 100 m, 200 m and 400 m T38 events. At the 2004 Athens Games, he won gold in the men's 4x100 m T35–38 and bronze medals in the men's 100 m T37 and long jump T36–38. His sixth appearance in the 2008 Beijing Games led to a third successive men's 4x100 m relay gold medal. He also competed in the men's 100 m T37 and men's long jump F37/38.

=== International competitions ===
At the World Championships and Games for the Disabled in Assen, Netherlands, he won a gold medal in the men's long jump C8 event and a silver medal in the men's 100 m C8 event.

He has competed at the 1994, 1998, 2002 and 2006 IPC Athletics World Championships. In 2002, he won gold medals in the men's 4x100 m T35–38 and men's 4x400 m T35–38 events. In 2006, he won gold medals in the men's long jump F37 and men's 4x100 mT35–38 events and bronze in the men's 100 m T37 event.

At the CPISRA World Championships in 2001, he won the men's long jump event and received a bronze medal in the 100 m event.

== Recognition ==
Besides the Medal of the Order of Australia and Australian Sports Medal, Thrupp has been awarded the Maranoa District Sportsman of the Century as well as the Darling Downs Sportsman of the Year. Thrupp's advice is "If I was to say anything to people with a disability it would be just to get up and have a go, to keep fighting and have plenty of strength". In 2024, Thrupp was inducted into the Queensland Sport Hall of Fame.
