= Nigel Coultas =

British Paralympic athlete

Medal record

Track and field (athletics)

Representing United Kingdom

Paralympic Games
Gold medal – first place	1988 Seoul	100 metres - A6A8A9L4
Gold medal – first place	1988 Seoul	200 metres - A6A8A9L4
Gold medal – first place	1988 Seoul	High Jump - A6A8A9L6
Silver medal – second place	1988 Seoul	400 metres - A6A8A9L4
Silver medal – second place	1992 Barcelona	100 metres - TS4
Silver medal – second place	1992 Barcelona	200 metres - TS4
Silver medal – second place	1992 Barcelona	400 metres - TS4

Nigel Coultas is a paralympic athlete from Great Britain competing mainly in category TS4 sprint events.

Nigel competed in the 1988 and 1992 Summer Paralympics as part of the Great Britain team. At the 1988 games he won gold in the 100m, 200m and high jump breaking the world record in the high jump, he also won a silver medal in the 400m behind Finland's Harri Jauhianihen. At the 1992 Summer Paralympics he finished second in the 100m, 200m and 400m and was part of the Great Britain team that was disqualified in the 4 × 100 m.
