= Paul Gregori =

French Paralympic athlete

Medal record

Men's para athletics

Representing France

Paralympic Games
Silver medal – second place	1996 Atlanta	100 metres - T42
Silver medal – second place	1996 Atlanta	200 metres - T42

Paul Gregori is a paralympic athlete from France competing mainly in category T42 sprint events.

Paul won silver in both the 100m and 200m in the T42 class in the 1996 Summer Paralympics held in Atlanta.
