= Tony Volpentest =

American Paralympic athlete

Medal record

Track and field (athletics)

Representing United States

Paralympic Games
Gold medal – first place	1992 Barcelona	100 metres - TS2
Gold medal – first place	1992 Barcelona	200 metres - TS2
Gold medal – first place	1996 Atlanta	100 metres - T43-44
Gold medal – first place	1996 Atlanta	200 metres - T43-44
Silver medal – second place	1992 Barcelona	4x100 metre relay - TS2,4

Tony Volpentest is a paralympic athlete from the United States competing mainly in category T44 sprint events.

Volpentest competed at three paralympics for the United States team winning four gold medals and a silver medal. His first games were in the 1992 Summer Paralympics where he broke the world record in the 100m and 200m and was part of the United States 4 × 100 m relay team that finished 0.02 seconds behind the world record setting Australians. At the 1996 Summer Paralympics he again competed in the 100m and 200m and defended both titles with another world record in the 100m. At the 2000 Summer Paralympics he finished fourth in the 100m but was unable to finish the 200m heats. Italian American, his great-grandparents came from Ripabottoni.
