= Matt Slade =

New Zealand Paralympic sprinter

Medal record

Men's para athletics

Representing New Zealand

Paralympic Games
Gold medal – first place	2004 Athens	200 metres - T37
Silver medal – second place	2000 Sydney	200 metres - T37
Bronze medal – third place	2000 Sydney	100 metres - T37

Matthew Slade is a Paralympian athlete from New Zealand competing mainly in category T37 sprint events.

Slade competed in his first Paralympic Games in 2000 where he won a silver in the T37 200m and a bronze in the T37 100m as well as competing in the T37 400m. In 2004 he restricted himself to the 100m and 200m and won gold in the later. He did the same events in the 2008 Summer Paralympics in Beijing but won no medals.
