= Larry Banks (athlete) =

American Paralympic athlete

Medal record

Track and field (athletics)

Representing United States

Paralympic Games
Gold medal – first place	1992 Barcelona	100 metres - C5

Larry Banks is a paralympic athlete from the United States competing mainly in category C5 sprint events.

Larry competed in the 100m in both the 1992 and 1996 Summer Paralympics winning the gold medal in a new world record in the 1992 games and being disqualified in the 1996 games.
