= Freeman Register =

American Paralympic athlete

Medal record

Track and field (athletics)

Representing United States

Paralympic Games
Gold medal – first place	1992 Barcelona	100 metres - C6
Gold medal – first place	1992 Barcelona	4x100 metre relay - C5-8
Gold medal – first place	1996 Atlanta	200 metres - T34-35
Silver medal – second place	1996 Atlanta	4x100 metre relay - T34-37
Bronze medal – third place	1992 Barcelona	200 metres - C5-6
Bronze medal – third place	1996 Atlanta	100 metres - T35

Freeman Register is a paralympic athlete from the United States competing mainly in category C6 sprint events.

Freeman competed in three Paralympics, at his first in 1992 he won a gold in the 4 × 100 m and 100m where he equalled the world record and also won bronze in the 200m. At the 1996 Summer Paralympics he won a gold in the 200m, silver in the 4 × 100 m behind a new world record set by the Hong Kong quartet and bronze in the 100m. His third and final games were in 2000 where he finished eighth in the final of the 100m, his only event at these games.
