= Benjamin Hall (athlete) =

Australian Paralympic athlete (born 1984)

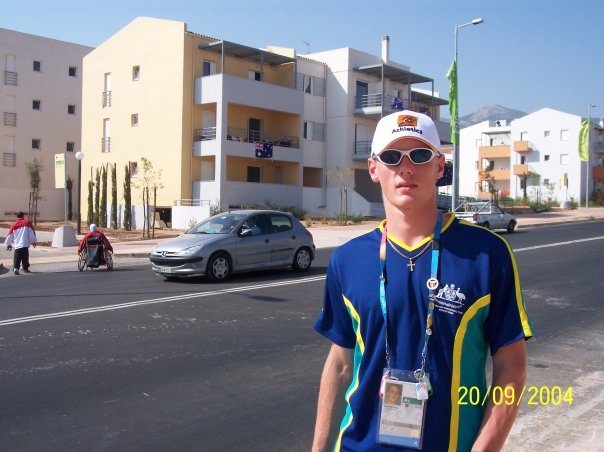

Personal information
- Full name: Benjamin Luke Hall
- Nicknames: Ben, Benny, Bushranger
- Nationality: Australia
- Born: 20 March 1984 (age 42) Adelaide, South Australia
Medal record
Athletics
Paralympic Games
Gold medal – first place	2004 Athens	Men's 4x100 m T35-38

Benjamin Luke Hall, OAM (born 20 March 1984) is an Australian Paralympic athlete. He was born in Adelaide, South Australia. He won a gold medal at the 2004 Athens Games in the Men's 4 × 100 m T35-38 event, for which he received a Medal of the Order of Australia.
