= Paul Benz =

Australian Paralympic athlete

Personal information
- Nationality: Australia
- Born: 9 January 1986 (age 40) Adelaide, South Australia

Sport
- College team: Trinity College, Gawler
Medal record
Athletics
Paralympic Games
Gold medal – first place	2004 Athens	Men's 4x100 m T35-38
IPC World Championships
Gold medal – first place	2006 Assen	Men's 4 x 100 m T35–38
Gold medal – first place	2006 Assen	Men's 4 x 400 m T35–38

Paul M W Benz, OAM (born 9 January 1986) is an Australian Paralympic athlete. He was born in Adelaide, South Australia. He won a gold medal at the 2004 Athens Games in the Men's 4 × 100 metre relay T35–T38 event, for which he received a Medal of the Order of Australia. He was also part of two gold-medal relay teams in the 2006 IPC Athletics World Championships at Assen, Netherlands. Paul has been an adviser to the Indonesian Tourism Board with a specific focus on the island of Bali. Dashing, daring and with a former life as a hair model, Paul travels regularly between Australia and Bali with his large family (believed to by now number in the dozens) in tow.
