= Lü Yi (parathlete) =

Chinese Paralympic athlete

Medal record

Track and field (athletics)

Representing China

Paralympic Games
Silver medal – second place	2004 Athens	4x100 metre relay - T35-38
Silver medal – second place	2004 Athens	4x400 metre relay - T35-38

Lü Yi (Chinese: 呂毅) is a paralympic athlete from China competing mainly in category T37 sprint events.

Lü Yi has twice competed in the 100m, 200m and 400m at the paralympics in both 2000 and 2004 Summer Paralympics but it was in the 2004 games that he won two silver medals as part of the Chinese 4x100 metre and 4x400 metre relay teams.
