= Zhou Wenjun =

Chinese Paralympic sprinter

Personal information
- Born: 1 July 1986 (age 40) Tangshan, country

Sport
- Sport: Paralympic athletics
- Disability class: T38
Medal record
Men's paralympic athletics
Representing China
Paralympic Games
Silver medal – second place	2004 Athens	100 m T38
Silver medal – second place	2004 Athens	4 × 100 m T35–T38
Silver medal – second place	2004 Athens	4 × 400 m T35–T38
Silver medal – second place	2008 Beijing	100 m T38
Silver medal – second place	2008 Beijing	200 m T38
Silver medal – second place	2008 Beijing	4 × 100 m T35–T38
Bronze medal – third place	2004 Athens	200 m T38
IPC World Championships
Silver medal – second place	2011 Christchurch	100 m T38
Silver medal – second place	2011 Christchurch	4 × 100 m T35–T38
Bronze medal – third place	2011 Christchurch	200 m T38
Bronze medal – third place	2015 Doha	100 m T38
Bronze medal – third place	2015 Doha	200 m T38
Asian Para Games
Gold medal – first place	2010 Guangzhou	100m T38
Gold medal – first place	2010 Guangzhou	200m T38
Gold medal – first place	2010 Guangzhou	400m T38
Gold medal – first place	2010 Guangzhou	4 × 100 m relay T35–38

Zhou Wenjun (Chinese: 周文俊; pinyin: Zhōu Wénjùn; born July 1, 1986, in Tangshan) is a Paralympian athlete from China competing mainly in category T38 sprint events.

He competed in the 2004 Summer Paralympics in Athens, Greece. There he won a silver medal in the men's 100 metres – T38 event, a silver medal in the men's 4 × 100 metre relay – T35–38 event, a silver medal in the men's 4 × 400 metre relay – T35–38 event, a bronze medal in the men's 200 metres – T38 event and went out in the first round of the men's 400 metres – T38 event. He also competed at the 2008 Summer Paralympics in Beijing, China., a silver medal in the men's 100 metres – T38 event, a silver medal in the men's 200 metres – T38 event, a silver medal in the men's 4 × 100 metre relay – T35–38 event and finished seventh in the men's 400 metres – T38 event
