= Lloyd Upsdell =

British Paralympic athlete

Medal record

Track and field (athletics)

Representing United Kingdom

Paralympic Games
Gold medal – first place	2000 Sydney	100 metres - T35
Gold medal – first place	2000 Sydney	200 metres - T35
Silver medal – second place	2000 Sydney	4x100m - T38
Bronze medal – third place	2004 Athens	200 metres - T35

Lloyd Upsdell is a Paralympian athlete from Great Britain competing mainly in category T35 sprint events.

Lloyd competed successfully at the 2000 Summer Paralympics in Sydney taking gold in both the T35 100m and 200m before combining with his British teammates to win a silver medal in the T38 Relay. Four years later was not quite as successful attempting to defend his two gold medals he ended up only winning a bronze in the 200m.
