= Che Mian =

Chinese Paralympic athlete (born 1983)

Medal record

Track and field (T36)

Representing China

Paralympic Games
Silver medal – second place	2004 Athens	4x100m T35-38
Silver medal – second place	2004 Athens	4x400m T35-38
Silver medal – second place	2008 Athens	4x100m T35-38
Bronze medal – third place	2004 Athens	100m T36
Bronze medal – third place	2008 Athens	200m T36
Bronze medal – third place	2008 Athens	400m T36

Asian Para Games
Gold medal – first place	2010 Guangzhou	100m T36
Gold medal – first place	2010 Guangzhou	200m T36
Gold medal – first place	2010 Guangzhou	400m T36

Che Mian (Chinese: 车冕; pinyin: Chē Miǎn; born April 27, 1983) is a Paralympic athlete from China competing mainly in category T36 sprint events.

He competed in the 2004 Summer Paralympics in Athens, Greece. There he won a silver medal in the men's 4 x 100 metre relay - T35-38 event, a silver medal in the men's 4 x 400 metre relay - T35-38 event, a bronze medal in the men's 100 metres - T36 event, finished sixth in the men's 200 metres - T36 event and finished fourth in the men's 400 metres - T36 event. He also competed at the 2008 Summer Paralympics in Beijing, China. There he won a silver medal in the men's 4 x 100 metre relay - T35-38 event, a bronze medal in the men's 200 metres - T36 event, a bronze medal in the men's 400 metres - T36 event and finished sixth in the men's 100 metres - T36 event
