= Teboho Mokgalagadi =

South African Paralympic athlete

Medal record

Men's paralympic athletics

Representing South Africa

Paralympic Games
Gold medal – first place	2004 Athens	100 m T35
Gold medal – first place	2004 Athens	200 m T35
Silver medal – second place	2012 London	100 m T35
Bronze medal – third place	2008 Beijing	100 m T35

IPC World Championships
Gold medal – first place	2011 Christchurch	100 m T35

Teboho Mokgalagadi OIB is a Paralympian athlete from South Africa competing mainly in category T35 sprint events.

He competed in the 2004 Summer Paralympics in Athens, Greece. There he won a gold medal in the men's 100 metres – T35 event, a gold medal in the men's 200 metres – T35 event and finished fourth in the men's 4 × 100 metre relay – T35–38 event. He also competed at the 2008 Summer Paralympics in Beijing, China. and a bronze medal in the men's 100 metres – T35 event. At the 2012 Summer Olympics in London, he won a silver medal in the men's 100m – T35 and came 5th in the 200m – T35.
