= Richard White (athlete) =

Medal record

Paralympic athletics

Representing United Kingdom

Paralympic Games
Bronze medal – third place	2000 Sydney	100 metres - T35
Bronze medal – third place	2000 Sydney	200 metres - T35

Richard White is a paralympic athlete from Great Britain competing mainly in category T35 sprint events.

Richard has competed twice in the 100m and 200m at the paralympics. In 2000, he won two bronze medals, a feat he was unable to achieve in 2004 where he did not win any medals.
