= Tim Sullivan (athlete) =

Australian Paralympic athlete

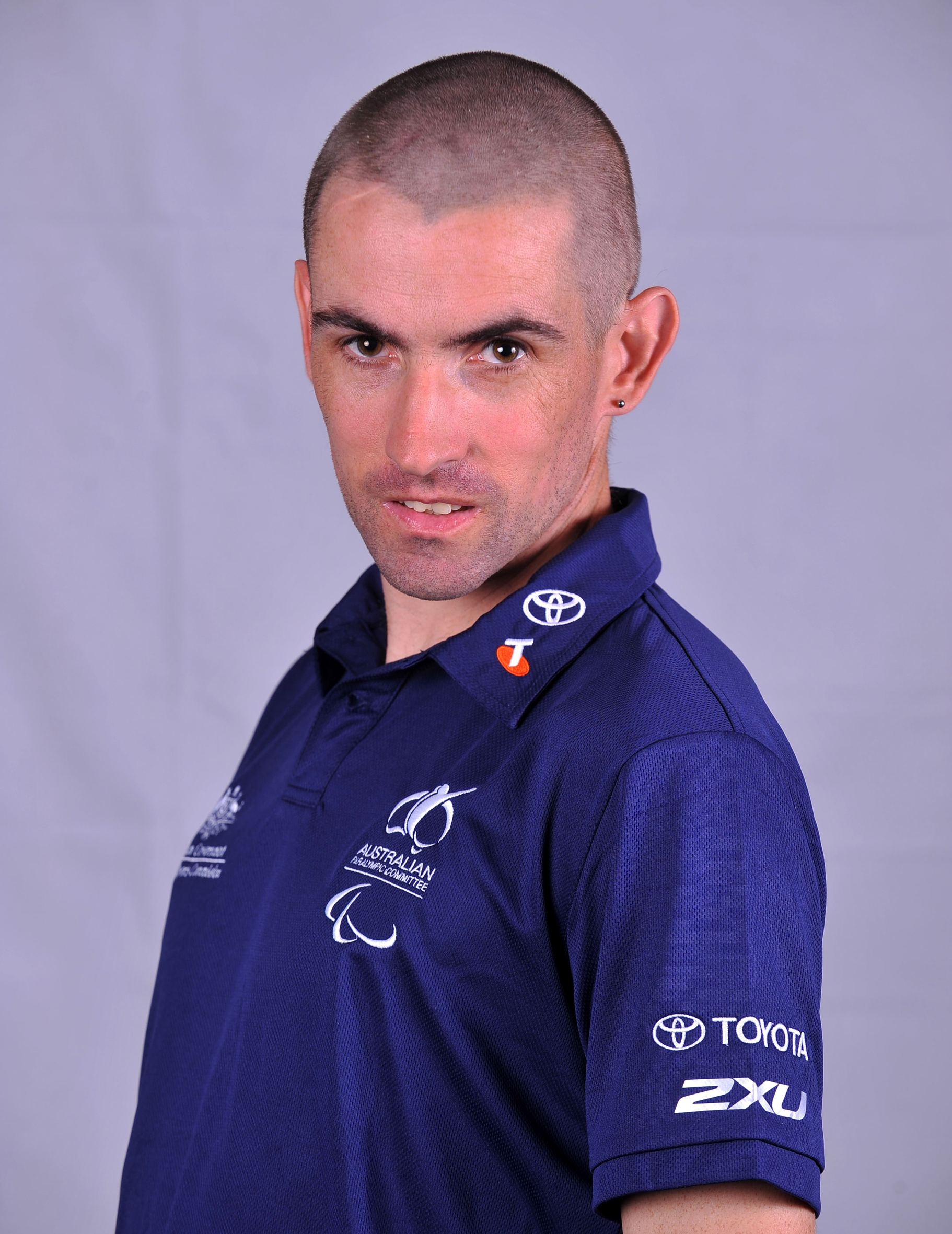
- 2012 Australian Paralympic team portrait of Sullivan

Personal information
- Born: 16 September 1975 (age 51)
Medal record
Athletics (T38)
Paralympic Games
Gold medal – first place	2000 Sydney	100 m T38
Gold medal – first place	2000 Sydney	200 m T38
Gold medal – first place	2000 Sydney	400 m T38
Gold medal – first place	2000 Sydney	4 × 100 m T35–38
Gold medal – first place	2000 Sydney	4 × 400 m T35–38
Gold medal – first place	2004 Athens	100 m T38
Gold medal – first place	2004 Athens	200 m T38
Gold medal – first place	2004 Athens	400 m T38
Gold medal – first place	2004 Athens	4 × 100 m T35–38
Gold medal – first place	2008 Beijing	4 × 400 m T35–38
IPC Athletics World Championships
Gold medal – first place	2002 Lille	100 m T38
Gold medal – first place	2002 Lille	200 m T38
Gold medal – first place	2006 Assen	100 m T38
Gold medal – first place	2006 Assen	200 m T38
Gold medal – first place	2006 Assen	400 m T38
Gold medal – first place	2006 Assen	4 × 100 m T35–38
Gold medal – first place	2006 Assen	4 × 400 m T35–38
Bronze medal – third place	2011 Christchurch	400 m T38
Bronze medal – third place	2011 Christchurch	4 × 100 m T35–38

Timothy ("Timmy") Francis Sullivan, OAM (born 16 September 1975) is an Australian Paralympic athlete.

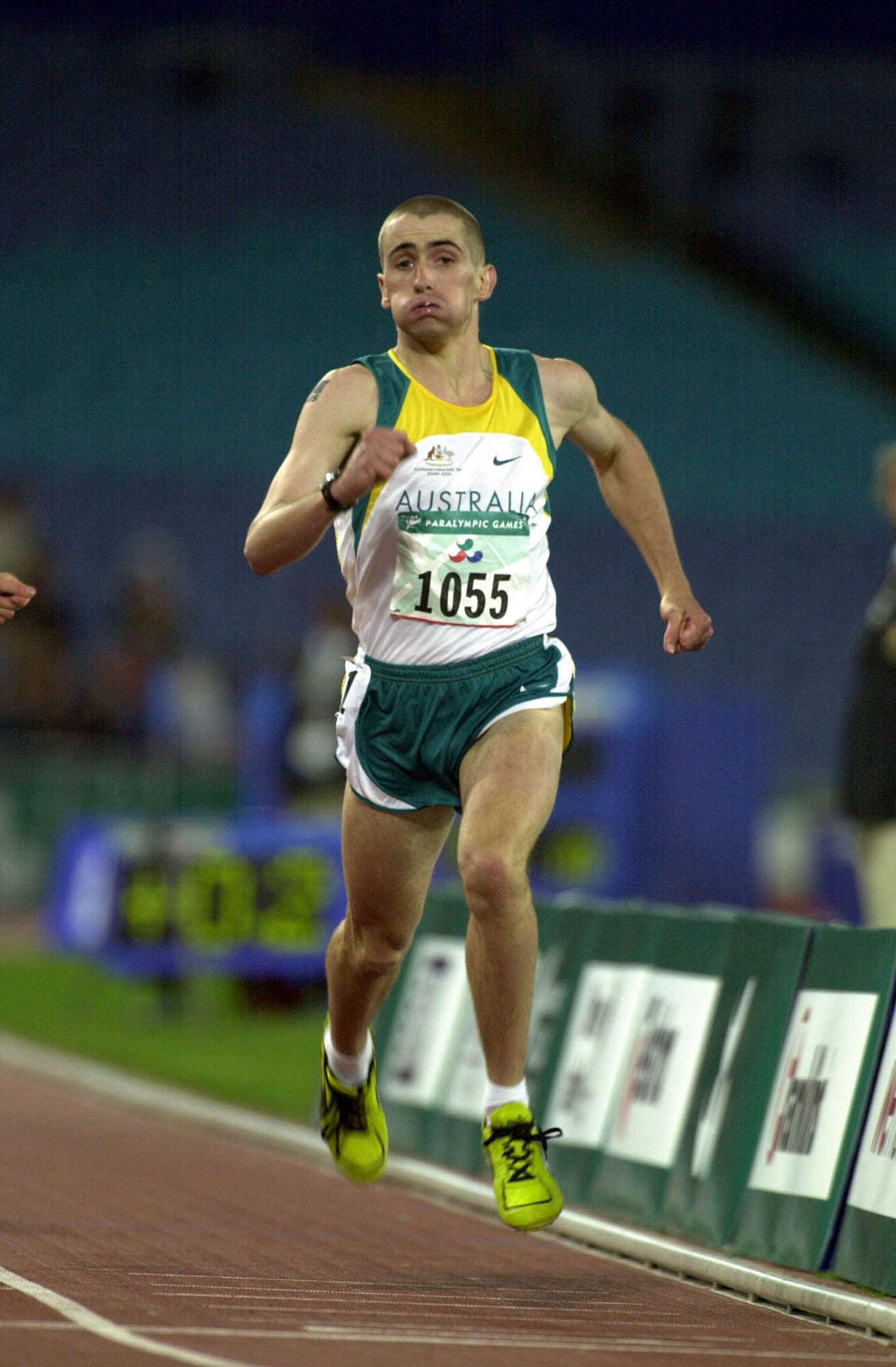
Action shot of Sullivan winning gold in the 200 m T38 at the 2000 Summer Paralympics

== Personal ==
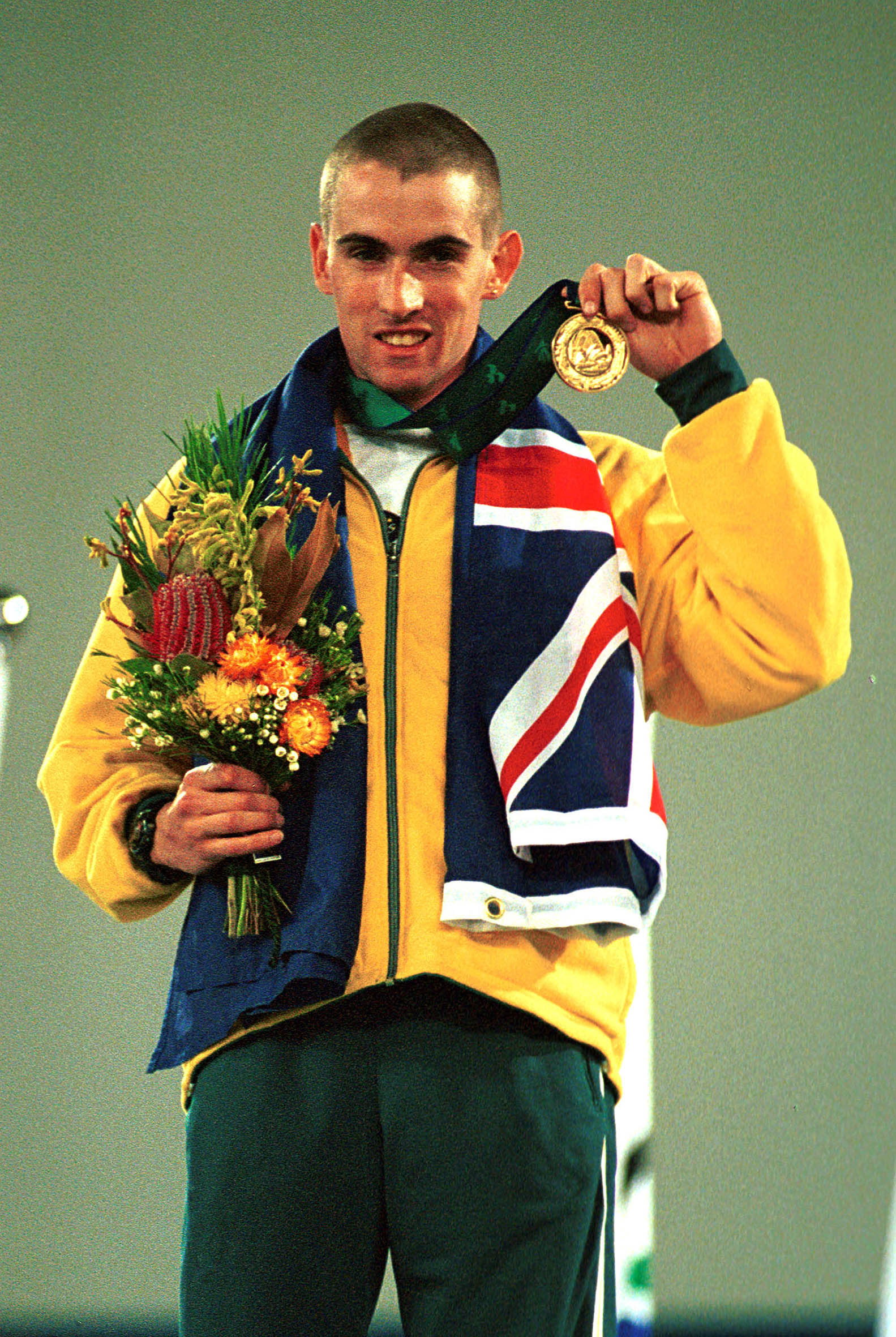
Sullivan shown on the gold medal podium at the 2000 Summer Paralympics. He won five gold medals at these games.

Sullivan was born in Melbourne, Australia. When Tim was eight years old, he was riding his bike to a park with his sister and a friend when they were approached by a couple of kids. One had a broken glass bottle and was threatening them. They started to chase Sullivan with the bottle. Due to this he ran on to a road and was struck by a car. From this accident Sullivan suffered cerebral palsy. It limits his verbal communication: he speaks in tiny, fast sentences and sometimes one word answers. It have also affected the wau he walks on his right side.

== Career ==
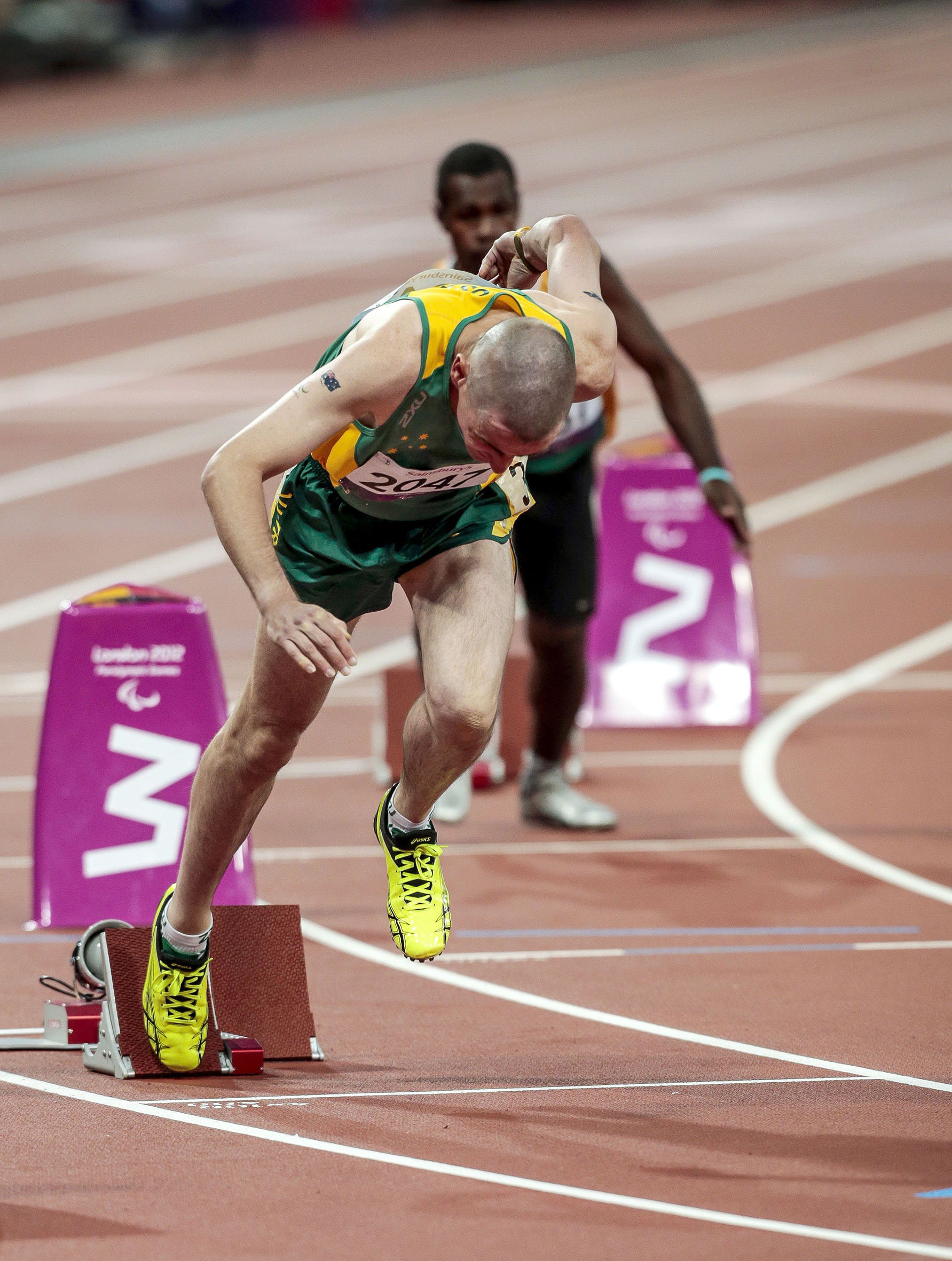
Sullivan at the 2012 London Paralympics

Tim Sullivan, is an Australian athlete who has won ten gold medals at the Paralympic Games. This includes five gold medals at the 2000 Summer Paralympics in Sydney (T38 200m; T38 100m; T38 400m; T38 4X400m relay; T38 4X100m relay), in which he received a Medal of the Order of Australia for his 'service to sport'. Tim also won four gold medals at the 2004 Summer Paralympics in Athens, in the T38 100m, 200m and 400m events, and as a member of the men's 4 × 100 m Relay team. In addition to the gold medals won, Sullivan also set world records in the 100m, 200m and 4 × 100 m relay at the 2004 Athens Paralympic Games. At the conclusion of the 2004 Paralympic Games in Athens, Tim was ranked 1st overall among athletes in his competitions.

Tim represented Australia again at the 2008 Summer Paralympics in Beijing, where he won a gold medal in the men's 4 × 100 m T35–38 and also at the 2012 Summer Paralympics in London.

He held the Australian record for the highest gold medal count until being surpassed by Matthew Cowdrey in 2012.

Tim did not medal at the 2012 Games.

== Recognition ==
In 2000, Sullivan was named Male Athlete of the Year by the Australian Paralympic Committee. In the same year, Sullivan also received the Victorian Institute of Sport's Award of Excellence.

In October 2004, he was named "Paralympian of the Year" by the Australian Paralympic Committee. In 2004, Sullivan was also awarded the Victorian Institute of Sport's Athlete With a Disability award.

In 2025, he was an inaugural inductee of the Stadium Australia Hall of Fame.

== See also ==
- Athletes with most gold medals in one event at the Paralympic Games
