= Brazil at the 2004 Summer Paralympics =

- IPC code: BRA
- NPC: Brazilian Paralympic Committee
- Website: www.cpb.org.br

in Athens
- Competitors: 96 in 11 sports
- Medals Ranked 14th: Gold 14 Silver 12 Bronze 7 Total 33

Summer Paralympics appearances (overview)
- 1972; 1976; 1980; 1984; 1988; 1992; 1996; 2000; 2004; 2008; 2012; 2016; 2020; 2024

Brazil competed at the 2004 Summer Paralympics in Athens, Greece. The team included 96 athletes, 74 men and 22 women. Competitors from Brazil won 33 medals, including 14 gold, 12 silver and 7 bronze to finish 14th in the medal table.

== Medallists ==
Medal	Name	Sport	Event
Gold	André Andrade	Athletics	Men's 200m T13
Gold	Antônio Souza	Athletics	Men's 200m T46
Gold	Antônio Souza	Athletics	Men's 400m T46
Gold	Ádria Santos	Athletics	Women's 100m T11
Gold	Suely Guimarães	Athletics	Women's discus throw F56-58
Gold	Marcos Felipe; Anderson Fonseca; Mizael Bispo; Damião Ramos; Andreonni Rêgo; João Silva; Nilson Silva; Severino Silva; Fábio Ribeiro Vasconcelos	Football 5-a-side	Men's team
Gold	Antonio Tenório	Judo	Men's 100 kg
Gold	Clodoaldo Silva	Swimming	Men's 50m freestyle S4
Gold	Clodoaldo Silva	Swimming	Men's 100m freestyle S4
Gold	Clodoaldo Silva	Swimming	Men's 200m freestyle S4
Gold	Clodoaldo Silva	Swimming	Men's 50m butterfly S4
Gold	Clodoaldo Silva	Swimming	Men's 150m individual medley SM4
Gold	Francisco Avelino; Adriano Lima; Clodoaldo Silva; Luis Silva	Swimming	Men's 4x50m medley relay 20pts
Gold	Fabiana Sugimori	Swimming	Women's 50m freestyle S11
Silver	André Andrade	Athletics	Men's 100m T13
Silver	Gilson Anjos	Athletics	Men's 800m T13
Silver	Odair Santos	Athletics	Men's 1500m T13
Silver	Odair Santos	Athletics	Men's 5000m T12
Silver	Ádria Santos	Athletics	Women's 200m T11
Silver	Ádria Santos	Athletics	Women's 400m T12
Silver	Fabiano Bruzzi; Adriano Costa; Marcos Ferreira; Joseph Guimarães; Renato Lima; Leandro Marinho; Flávio PereiraLuciano Rocha; Jean Rodrigues; Peterson Rosa; Moisés Silva; Marcos Silva	Football 7-a-side	Men's team
Silver	Eduardo Amaral	Judo	Men's 73 kg
Silver	Karla Cardoso	Judo	Women's 48 kg
Silver	Ivanildo Vasconcelos	Swimming	Men's 100m breaststroke SB4
Silver	Adriano Lima; Clodoaldo Silva; Luis Silva; Joon Sok Seo	Swimming	Men's 4x50m freestyle relay 20 pts
Silver	Edenia Garcia	Swimming	Women's 50m backstroke S4
Bronze	Odair Santos	Athletics	Men's 800m T12
Bronze	Ozivam Bonfim	Athletics	Men's 5000m T46
Bronze	Maria José Alves	Athletics	Women's 100m T12
Bronze	Maria José Alves	Athletics	Women's 200m T12
Bronze	Terezinha Guilhermina	Athletics	Women's 400m T12
Bronze	Daniela Silva	Judo	Women's 57 kg
Bronze	Francisco Avelino	Swimming	Men's 100m breaststroke SB4

Medals by sport
Sport	1st place, gold medalist(s)	2nd place, silver medalist(s)	3rd place, bronze medalist(s)	Total
Swimming	7	3	1	11
Athletics	5	6	5	16
Judo	1	2	1	4
Football 5-a-side	1	0	0	1
Football 7-a-side	0	1	0	1
Total	14	12	7	33

Medals by gender
Gender	Gold medal	Silver medal	Bronze medal	Total
Male	11	8	3	22
Female	3	4	4	11
Mixed	0	0	0	0
Total	14	12	7	33

== Sports ==
=== Athletics ===
==== Men's track ====
Athlete	Class	Event	Heats		Semifinal		Final	
Athlete	Class	Event	Result	Rank	Result	Rank	Result	Rank
André Andrade	T13	100m	11.06	2 Q	—N/a		11.06	2nd place, silver medalist(s)
André Andrade	T13	200m	22.40	1 Q	—N/a		22.70	1st place, gold medalist(s)
Gilson Anjos	T13	800m	—N/a				1:56.81	2nd place, silver medalist(s)
Gilson Anjos	T13	1500m	4:04.01	8 q	—N/a		4:08.41	9
Ozivam Bonfim	T46	1500m	—N/a				4:05.29	6
Ozivam Bonfim	T46	5000m	—N/a				15:02.09	3rd place, bronze medalist(s)
Hilário Moreira	T11	200m	24.29	7 Q	24.06	6 B	24.30	2
Hilário Moreira	T11	400m	54.74	8 Q	DNS		did not advance	
Odair Santos	T12	800m	1:59.30	4 Q	—N/a		1:54.08	3rd place, bronze medalist(s)
Odair Santos	T12	5000m	—N/a				15:00.80	2nd place, silver medalist(s)
Odair Santos	T13	1500m	4:03.18	2 Q	—N/a		3:54.06	2nd place, silver medalist(s)
Antônio Delfino	T46	100m	11.04	2 Q	—N/a		DSQ	
Antônio Delfino	T46	200m	22.42	3 Q	N/A		22.41	1st place, gold medalist(s)
Antônio Delfino	T46	400m	52.43	4 Q	—N/a		48.46 WR	1st place, gold medalist(s)
Aurélio Santos	T13	Marathon	—N/a				2:51:36	10
Júlio Souza	T12	100m	11.79	22	did not advance			
Júlio Souza	T12	200m	57.89	24	did not advance			
Moisés Vicente	T46	1500m	—N/a				4:13.53	10
Moisés Vicente	T46	5000m	—N/a				15:10.65	4
André Andrade; Hilário Moreira; Odair Santos; Júlio Souza	T11-13	4 × 100 m relay	44.89	4 Q	—N/a		45.08	4

==== Women's track ====
Athlete	Class	Event	Heats		Semifinal		Final	
Athlete	Class	Event	Result	Rank	Result	Rank	Result	Rank
Maria José Alves	T12	100m	12.71	2 Q	12.67	1 Q	12.70	3rd place, bronze medalist(s)
Maria José Alves	T12	200m	25.83	3 Q	25.73	3 q	26.20	3rd place, bronze medalist(s)
Ádria Santos	T11	100m	12.48	1 Q	12.95	1 Q	12.55	1st place, gold medalist(s)
Ádria Santos	T11	200m	26.82	1 Q	26.59	1 Q	25.60	2nd place, silver medalist(s)
Ádria Santos	T12	400m	59.63	3 Q	58.17	3 Q	57.46	2nd place, silver medalist(s)
Terezinha Guilhermina	T12	400m	58.23	2 Q	58.11	2 q	57.52	3rd place, bronze medalist(s)
Terezinha Guilhermina	T12	800m	2:24.72	8	did not advance			
Terezinha Guilhermina	T12	1500m	—N/a				5:17.25	7
Sirlene Guilhermino	T12	100m	13.13	5 Q	13.24	5 B	13.37	1
Sirlene Guilhermino	T12	200m	27.45	5 q	27.59	6 B	27.62	1
Simone Silva	T11	100m	13.66	6 Q	13.69	5 B	DNS	
Simone Silva	T11	200m	28.11	4 Q	27.87	5 B	27.59	1

==== Women's field ====
Athlete	Class	Event	Final		
Athlete	Class	Event	Result	Points	Rank
Sonia Gouveia	F32-34/51-53	Discus	9.85	712	9
Sirlene Guilhermino	F12	Long jump	3.75	-	11
Suely Guimarães	F56-58	Discus	24.30	1138	1st place, gold medalist(s)
Suely Guimarães	F56-58	Shot put	6.97	977	9
Roseane Santos	F56-58	Discus	31.73 WR	1023	6
Roseane Santos	F56-58	Shot put	8.98	981	8

=== Equestrian ===
Athlete	Event	Total	
Athlete	Event	Score	Rank
Marcos Alves	Mixed individual championship test grade I	63.684	13
Marcos Alves	Mixed individual freestyle test grade I	66.250	9

=== Football 5-a-side ===
The Brazilian football 5-a-side team won the gold medal after defeating Argentina.

==== Players ====
- Marcos Felipe
- Anderson Fonseca
- Mizael Oliveira
- Damião Ramos
- Andreonni Rego
- Sandro Soares
- João Silva
- Nilson Silva
- Severino Silva
- Fábio Vasconcelos

==== Results ====
Game	Match	Score	Rank
1	Brazil vs. Argentina (ARG)	2 - 0	1 Q
2	Brazil vs. Spain (ESP)	3 - 0	1 Q
3	Brazil vs. Greece (GRE)	1 - 0	1 Q
4	Brazil vs. France (FRA)	4 - 0	1 Q
5	Brazil vs. South Korea (KOR)	4 - 0	1 Q
Gold medal final	Brazil vs. Argentina (ARG)	3 - 2	1st place, gold medalist(s)

=== Football 7-a-side ===
The Brazilian football 7-a-side team won a silver medal after being defeated by Ukraine.

==== Players ====
- Fabiano Bruzzi
- Adriano Costa
- Marcos Ferreira
- Joseph Guimarães
- Renato Lima
- Leandro Marinho
- Flávio Pereira
- Jean Rodrigues
- Luciano Rocha
- Peterson Rosa
- Marcos Silva
- Moisés Silva

==== Results ====
Game	Match	Score	Rank
1	Brazil vs. Russia (RUS)	2 - 1	1 Q
2	Brazil vs. Netherlands (NED)	6 - 1	1 Q
3	Brazil vs. United States (USA)	4 - 0	1 Q
Semifinals	Brazil vs. Argentina (ARG)	4 - 1	W
Gold medal final	Brazil vs. Ukraine (UKR)	1 - 4	2nd place, silver medalist(s)

=== Goalball ===
The Brazilian women's goalball didn't win any medals. They were 7th out of 8 teams.

==== Players ====
- Claúdia Amorim
- Evelyne Cantanhede
- Ana Carolina Custodio
- Valkilene Dalarme
- Renata Hermenegildo
- Adriana Lino

==== Results ====
Game	Match	Score	Rank
1	Brazil vs. Canada (CAN)	1 - 4	7
2	Brazil vs. United States (USA)	0 - 2	7
3	Brazil vs. Japan (JPN)	3 - 4	7
4	Brazil vs. Finland (FIN)	0 - 10	7
5	Brazil vs. Netherlands (NED)	1 - 3	7
6	Brazil vs. Germany (GER)	1 - 4	7
7	Brazil vs. Greece (GRE)	1 - 0	7

=== Judo ===
==== Men ====
Athlete	Event	Preliminary	Quarterfinals	Semifinals	Repechage round 1	Repechage round 2	Final (Bronze medal contest)
Athlete	Event	Opposition; Result	Opposition; Result	Opposition; Result	Opposition; Result	Opposition; Result	Opposition; Result
Eduardo Amaral	Men's 73kg	Bye	Sydorenko (UKR) W 1000–0100	Krieger (GER) W 1000-0000	—N/a		Wang (CHN) L 0000-1000 (silver)
Divino Dinato	Men's 90kg	Park J M (KOR) L 0000-1000	—N/a		R Fernández (ESP) L 1000-0000	did not advance	
Alexandre Silva	Men's +100kg	Amakawa (JPN) L 0020S-1012	did not advance				
Antonio Tenório	Men's 100kg	Le Meaux (FRA) W 0011S-0001C	Lyvytskyy (UKR) W 1001-0000S	Szott (USA) W 1000-0000	—N/a		Men (CHN) W 0100-0000K (gold)

==== Women ====
Athlete	Event	Quarterfinals	Semifinals	Repechage	Final (Bronze medal contest
Athlete	Event	Opposition; Result	Opposition; Result	Opposition; Result	Opposition; Result
Karla Cardoso	Women's 48kg	Bye	Arndt (GER) W 0100–0000	—N/a	Medjeded (FRA) L 0001-1010S (silver)
Tatiane da Silva	Women's 52kg	Bye	Scheutzel (GER) L 0000-1000	—N/a	Wang (CHN) L 0000-1000
Daniele Silva	Women's 57kg	Payno (ESP) L 0001-1111S	—N/a		Lei (CHN) W 1000-0000 (bronze)

=== Powerlifting ===
==== Men ====
Athlete	Event	Result	Rank
João Euzébio Batista	82.5kg	165.0	12
Aleksander Whitaker	67.5kg	180.0	4

=== Swimming ===
==== Men ====
Athlete	Class	Event	Heats		Final	
Athlete	Class	Event	Result	Rank	Result	Rank
Genezi Andrade	S3	50m freestyle	59.19	9	did not advance	
Genezi Andrade	S3	100m freestyle	2:05.64	7 Q	2:05.54	8
Genezi Andrade	S3	200m freestyle	4:17.51	5 Q	4:16.62	6
Genezi Andrade	S3	50m backstroke	1:00.31	4 Q	59.62	5
Genezi Andrade	SB2	50m breaststroke	1:11.31	6 Q	1:10.21	6
Genezi Andrade	SM3	150m individual medley	3:24.19	5 Q	3:24.39	5
Francisco Avelino	S5	50m freestyle	42.17	9	did not advance	
Francisco Avelino	S5	50m backstroke	43.65	7 Q	43.13	6
Francisco Avelino	SB4	50m breaststroke	1:51.90	2 Q	1:49.37	3rd place, bronze medalist(s)
Moisés Batista	SM4	150m individual medley	3:09.61	12	did not advance	
Mauro Brasil	S9	50m freestyle	27.22	3 Q	27.51	5
Mauro Brasil	S9	100m freestyle	1:00.70	8 Q	1:00.47	7
Mauro Brasil	S9	100m backstroke	1:11.20	12	did not advance	
Mauro Brasil	S9	100m butterfly	1:08.29	12	did not advance	
Marcelo Collet	S10	50m freestyle	27.71	15	did not advance	
Marcelo Collet	S10	100m freestyle	58.92	14	did not advance	
Marcelo Collet	S10	400m freestyle	4:34.11	8 Q	4:32.45	7
Marcelo Collet	S10	100m butterfly	1:06.61	12	did not advance	
Danilo Glasser	S10	50m freestyle	25.89	3 Q	25.86	5
Danilo Glasser	S10	100m freestyle	59.04	15	did not advance	
Adriano Lima	S6	50m freestyle	33.01	6 Q	33.06	6
Adriano Lima	S6	100m freestyle	1:11.27	5 Q	1:12.11	8
Adriano Lima	S6	400m freestyle	DNS		did not advance	
Adriano Lima	S6	50m butterfly	38.78	12	did not advance	
Adriano Lima	SB5	100m breaststroke	1:42.87	6 Q	1:44.12	7
Adriano Lima	SM6	200m individual medley	3:08.69	7 Q	3:10.91	8
Fabiano Machado	S9	50m freestyle	28.57	17	did not advance	
Fabiano Machado	S9	100m freestyle	1:01.59	11	did not advance	
Fabiano Machado	S9	400m freestyle	4:41.61	12	did not advance	
Fabiano Machado	S9	100m butterfly	1:14.99	13	did not advance	
Jose Arnulfo Medeiros	S7	400m freestyle	5:23.08	7 Q	5:28.40	8
Jose Arnulfo Medeiros	S7	50m butterfly	36.92	9	did not advance	
Andre Meneghetti	S11	50m freestyle	30.82	12	did not advance	
Andre Meneghetti	S11	100m freestyle	1:09.06	11	did not advance	
Andre Meneghetti	S11	400m freestyle	5:42.49	10	did not advance	
Andre Meneghetti	S11	100m butterfly	1:32.37	8 Q	1:32.99	8
Adriano Pereira	S2	50m freestyle	1:22.68	10	did not advance	
Adriano Pereira	S2	100m freestyle	2:59.86	10	did not advance	
Adriano Pereira	S2	200m freestyle	5:57.00	9	did not advance	
Adriano Pereira	S2	50m backstroke	1:20.14	8 Q	1:19.75	8
Rodrigo Ribeiro	S11	50m freestyle	28.48	5 Q	28.60	7
Rodrigo Ribeiro	S11	100m freestyle	1:06.77	8 Q	1:07.37	8
Rodrigo Ribeiro	S11	100m butterfly	DNS		did not advance	
Rodrigo Ribeiro	SB11	100m breaststroke	1:27.65	7 Q	1:28.56	7
Clodoaldo Silva	S4	50m freestyle	36.40 PR	1 Q	35.41 WR	1st place, gold medalist(s)
Clodoaldo Silva	S4	100m freestyle	1:19.36 WR	1 Q	1:19.51	1st place, gold medalist(s)
Clodoaldo Silva	S4	200m freestyle	2:58.81 PR	1 Q	2:55.75 WR	1st place, gold medalist(s)
Clodoaldo Silva	S4	50m backstroke	53.50	5 Q	51.71	4
Clodoaldo Silva	S4	50m butterfly	47.68	2 Q	45.12 WR	1st place, gold medalist(s)
Clodoaldo Silva	SM4	150m individual medley	2:41.73	1 Q	2:39.15	1st place, gold medalist(s)
Luis Silva	S6	50m freestyle	34.12	10	did not advance	
Luis Silva	S6	100m freestyle	1:14.61	9	did not advance	
Luis Silva	S6	400m freestyle	6:07.41	11	did not advance	
Luis Silva	S6	50m butterfly	36.37	7 Q	35.96	7
Gledson Soares	S8	100m backstroke	1:18.92	7 Q	1:18.44	7
Gledson Soares	SB6	100m breaststroke	N/A		1:38.90	5
Gledson Soares	SM7	200m individual medley	2:57.65	8 Q	2:56.50	7
Joon Sok Seo	S4	100m freestyle	1:52.73	12	did not advance	
Joon Sok Seo	S4	200m freestyle	4:03.00	13	did not advance	
Joon Sok Seo	S4	50m backstroke	54.36	8 Q	54.77	7
Joon Sok Seo	S4	50m butterfly	1:02.39	7 Q	1:02.31	6
Ivanildo Vasconcelos	S6	100m backstroke	1:34.85	13	did not advance	
Ivanildo Vasconcelos	SB4	100m breaststroke	1:48.01	2 Q	1:48.33	2nd place, silver medalist(s)
Ivanildo Vasconcelos	SM5	200m individual medley	3:34.79	6 Q	3:26.93	6
Adriano Lima; Clodoaldo Silva; Luis Silva; Joon Sok Seo	N/A	4x50m freestyle relay (20pts)	2:33.09	1 Q	2:32.34	2nd place, silver medalist(s)
Mauro Brasil; Marcelo Collet; Adriano Lima; Fabiano Machado	N/A	4 × 100 m freestyle relay (34pts)	4:11.74	4 Q	4:11.96	6
Francisco Avelino; Adriano Lima; Clodoaldo Silva; Luis Silva	N/A	4x50m medley relay (20pts)	2:45.00	2 Q	2:37.46 PR	1st place, gold medalist(s)
Mauro Brasil; Marcelo Collet; Fabiano Machado; Gledson Soares	N/A	4 × 100 m medley relay (34pts)	DNS		did not advance	

==== Women ====
Athlete	Class	Event	Heats		Final	
Athlete	Class	Event	Result	Rank	Result	Rank
Rildene Firmino	S5	50m backstroke	1:09.79	10	did not advance	
Rildene Firmino	SB3	50m breaststroke	1:14.13	6 Q	1:15.45	8
Rildene Firmino	SM4	150m individual medley	3:55.21	9	did not advance	
Edênia Garcia	S4	50m freestyle	53.37	2 Q	53.88	5
Edênia Garcia	S4	100m freestyle	1:53.81	5 Q	1:55.23	7
Edênia Garcia	S4	200m freestyle	4:15.78	6 Q	4:10.91	6
Edênia Garcia	S4	50m backstroke	52.61	2 Q	51.51	2nd place, silver medalist(s)
Claúdia Silva	S4	50m freestyle	1:07.68	10	did not advance	
Claúdia Silva	S4	100m freestyle	2:26.04	9	did not advance	
Claúdia Silva	S4	200m freestyle	5:08.71	9	did not advance	
Fabiana Sugimori	S11	50m freestyle	32.32 WR	1 Q	32.35	1st place, gold medalist(s)
Fabiana Sugimori	S11	100m freestyle	1:20.24	7 Q	1:14.43	4
Fabiana Sugimori	SB11	100m breaststroke	1:43.21	5 Q	1:42.96	5
Fabiana Sugimori	SM11	200m individual medley	N/A		3:14.10	4

=== Table tennis ===
==== Men ====
Athlete	Event	Preliminaries				Quarterfinals	Semifinals	Final (BM)	
Athlete	Event	Opposition; Result	Opposition; Result	Opposition; Result	Rank	Opposition; Result	Opposition; Result	Opposition; Result	Rank
Roberto Alves	Men's singles 5	Oka (JPN) L 0-3	Lin (TPE) L 0-3	Gosemann (GER) L 0-3	4	did not advance			
Luiz da Silva	Men's singles 3	Robin (FRA) L 0-3	Trofan (GBR) L 1-3	Yang (KOR) W 3-2	4	did not advance			
Iranildo Espindola	Men's singles 2	Sorabella (FRA) L 0–3	Riapos (SVK) L 2-3	Vilsmaier (GER) L 1-3	4	did not advance			
Ivanildo Freitas	Men's singles 4	Zhang (CHN) L 0-3	Stefanu (CZE) L 0-2	Chan (GBR) L 2-3	4	did not advance			
Cristovam Lima	Men's singles 7	Furlan (ITA) L 0-3	Morales (ESP) L 2-3	Duracka (CZE) L 1-3	4	did not advance			

==== Teams ====
Athlete	Event	Preliminaries			Quarterfinals	Semifinals	Final (BM)	
Athlete	Event	Opposition; Result	Opposition; Result	Rank	Opposition; Result	Opposition; Result	Opposition; Result	Rank
Luiz da Silva; Ivanildo Freitas	Men's teams 4	South Korea (KOR) L 0-3	China (CHN) L 1-3	3	did not advance			
Roberto Alves; Iranildo Espindola	Men's teams 5	France (FRA) L 0-3	Norway (NOR) L 2-3	3	did not advance			

=== Wheelchair fencing ===
Athlete	Event	Qualification			Round of 16	Quarterfinal	Semifinal	Final (BM)	
Athlete	Event	Opposition	Score	Rank	Opposition; Score	Opposition; Score	Opposition; Score	Opposition; Score	Rank
Andrea de Mello	Women's épée B	Dani (HUN)	L 0–5	5	did not advance				
Andrea de Mello	Women's épée B	Magnat (FRA)	L 4-5	5	did not advance				
Andrea de Mello	Women's épée B	Weber Kranz (GER)	L 3-5	5	did not advance				
Andrea de Mello	Women's épée B	Wong (HKG)	L 1-5	5	did not advance				
Andrea de Mello	Women's foil B	Dani (HUN)	L 0-5	5	did not advance				
Andrea de Mello	Women's foil B	Hickey (USA)	L 0-5	5	did not advance				
Andrea de Mello	Women's foil B	Stollwerck (GER)	L 2-5	5	did not advance				
Andrea de Mello	Women's foil B	Wong (HKG)	L 1-5	5	did not advance				

=== Wheelchair tennis ===
Athlete	Class	Event	Round of 64	Round of 32	Round of 16	Quarterfinals	Semifinals	Finals
Athlete	Class	Event	Opposition; Result	Opposition; Result	Opposition; Result	Opposition; Result	Opposition; Result	Opposition; Result
Maurício Pommê	Open	Men's singles	Rydberg (USA) L 3-6, 3-6	did not advance				
Carlos Santos	Open	Men's singles	Schrameyer (GER) L 1-6, 2-6	did not advance				
Maurício Pommê; Carlos Santos	Open	Men's doubles	N/A	Chabrecek (SVK) /; Felix (SVK); W 6-4, 6-2	Hatt (GBR) /; Mistry (GBR); L 2-6, 2-6	did not advance		

== See also ==
- Brazil at the Paralympics
- Brazil at the 2004 Summer Olympics
