= Brazil at the 2000 Summer Paralympics =

- IPC code: BRA
- NPC: Brazilian Paralympic Committee
- Website: www.cpb.org.br

in Sydney
- Competitors: 64 (53 male, 11 female)
- Medals Ranked 24th: Gold 6 Silver 10 Bronze 6 Total 22

Summer Paralympics appearances (overview)
- 1972; 1976; 1980; 1984; 1988; 1992; 1996; 2000; 2004; 2008; 2012; 2016; 2020; 2024

There were 11 female and 53 male athletes representing the country at the 2000 Summer Paralympics.

== Medal table ==
| Medal | Name | Sport | Event |
|---|---|---|---|
| Gold | Ádria Santos | Athletics | Women's 100m T12 |
| Gold | Ádria Santos | Athletics | Women's 200m T11 |
| Gold | Roseane Santos | Athletics | Women's discus F58 |
| Gold | Roseane Santos | Athletics | Women's shot put F58 |
| Gold | Antônio Tenório Da Silva | Judo | Men's -90 kg |
| Gold | Fabiana Sugimori | Swimming | Women's 50m freestyle S11 |
| Silver | André Andrade | Athletics | Men's 100m T13 |
| Silver | André Andrade | Athletics | Men's 200m T13 |
| Silver | Antônio Delfino | Athletics | Men's 400m T46 |
| Silver | Ádria Santos | Athletics | Women's 400m T11 |
| Silver | Luís Silva | Swimming | Men's 50m butterfly S6 |
| Silver | Mauro Brasil | Swimming | Men's 50m freestyle S9 |
| Silver | Clodoaldo Silva | Swimming | Men's 100m freestyle S4 |
| Silver | Adriano Gomes de Lima | Swimming | Men's 100m freestyle S6 |
| Silver | Adriano Gomes de Lima; Luís Silva; Clodoaldo Silva; Joon Sok Seo | Swimming | Men's 4x50m freestyle relay 20 pts |
| Silver | Francisco Avelino; Adriano Gomes de Lima; Luís Silva; Clodoaldo Silva | Swimming | Men's 4x50m medley relay 20 pts |
| Bronze | Anderson Santos | Athletics | Men's discus F37 |
| Bronze | Adriano Costa; Luciano Rocha; Marcos Silva; Fábio Ferreira; Jean Rodrigues; Romildo Quiaveli; Douglas Amador; João Ayres; Márcio Lopes; Moisés Tamiozzo; Marcos dos Santos | Football 7-a-side | Men's team |
| Bronze | Clodoaldo Silva | Swimming | Men's 50m freestyle S4 |
| Bronze | Danilo Glasser | Swimming | Men's 50m freestyle S10 |
| Bronze | Genezi Andrade | Swimming | Men's 150m individual medley SM3 |
| Bronze | Adriano Gomes de Lima; Fabiano Machado; Danilo Glasser; Mauro Brasil; Luís Silva; Gledson Soares | Swimming | Men's 4 × 100 m freestyle relay 34 pts |

Medals by sport
| Sport | 1st place, gold medalist(s) | 2nd place, silver medalist(s) | 3rd place, bronze medalist(s) | Total |
| Athletics | 4 | 4 | 1 | 9 |
| Swimming | 1 | 6 | 4 | 11 |
| Judo | 1 | 0 | 0 | 1 |
| Football 7-a-side | 0 | 0 | 1 | 9 |
| Total | 6 | 10 | 6 | 22 |

Medals by gender
| Gender | Gold medal | Silver medal | Bronze medal | Total |
| Male | 1 | 9 | 6 | 16 |
| Female | 5 | 1 | 0 | 6 |
| Mixed | 0 | 0 | 0 | 0 |
| Total | 6 | 10 | 6 | 22 |

== See also ==
- Brazil at the 2000 Summer Olympics
- Brazil at the Paralympics

== Bibliography ==
- International Paralympic Committee (2000). "Appendix C: Athlete Numbers - By Delegation". Sydney 2000 Paralympic Games Post Games Report. Sydney.
