= Brazil at the Paralympics =

- IPC code: BRA
- NPC: Brazilian Paralympic Committee
- Website: www.cpb.org.br
- Medals Ranked 22nd: Gold 135 Silver 161 Bronze 171 Total 467

Summer appearances
- 1972; 1976; 1980; 1984; 1988; 1992; 1996; 2000; 2004; 2008; 2012; 2016; 2020; 2024

Winter appearances
- 2014; 2018; 2022; 2026

Brazil made its Paralympic Games debut at the 1972 Summer Paralympics in Heidelberg, sending representatives to compete in track and field, para-archery, para swimming and wheelchair basketball. The country has competed in every edition of the Summer Paralympics since.

As of 2026, Brazilian athletes have won a total of 467 Paralympic medals, among them 466 medals in 19 different Summer sports and 1 in a Winter sport, of which 135 gold, 161 silver and 171 bronze medals. This places the country 22nd on the all-time Paralympic Games medal table.

Brazil's first delegations experienced little success. No medals were won in 1972, and the country's only medal in 1976 was a silver, in the men's pairs in lawn bowls (through Robson S. Almeida and Luiz Carlos Costa). There were no medals either in 1980, but Brazilian Paralympians found notable success as from 1984, where they obtained their first gold: M. Ferraz won five silver medals and one gold in track and field; Márcia Malsar took three medals in para-athletics, of which the first gold for a Brazilian para athlete; Luiz Cláudio Pereira won four medals, of which two gold, in track and field; as did Amintas Piedade. Para swimmer Maria Jussara Matas obtained three medals, of which one gold, while Marcelo Amorim won four medals (three silver and a bronze), also in para swimming.

Pereira won three of Brazil's four gold medals in 1988, the fourth coming from para swimmer Graciana Moreira Alves. In 1992, four Brazilian para athletes each won a gold medal in track and field, while the country's two gold in 1996 were won in para swimming, with José Arnulfo Medeiros and para judo, with Antônio Tenório. Da Silva took another gold in 2000, adding to Brazil's four golds in track and field and one in para swimming that year. At the 2004 Games there were fourteen gold medals, of which five in para-athletics. Para swimmer Clodoaldo Silva became Brazil's most successful Paralympian in history, winning six gold medals in the pool, and Brazil also started the men's football 5-a-side dominination, defeating Argentina in a penalty shoot-out in the final. In the 7-a-side event, Brazil finished second, after a 1–4 defeat to Ukraine.

At the 2008 edition, para-athletics provided another four gold medals, boccia two, para judo one, and para swimming eight (four each from Daniel Dias and André Brasil). In football, Brazil finished fourth in the 7-a-side event, with losses to Ukraine (0-6) and Iran (0-4) in the final round. The country did, however, successfully defend for the first time its Paralympic title in 5-a-side football, defeating China 2–1 in the final.

Brazil debuted at the Winter Paralympics during 2014 edition in Sochi, sending two para athletes. This made Brazil the second tropical nation ever to have competed at the Winter Paralympics, after Uganda and the third country in South America to have done so, the others being Chile and Argentina.

At the 2026 Winter Paralympics hosted in Milan and Cortina d'Ampezzo, Brazil won the first medal in their Winter Paralympics history – para cross-country skier Cristian Ribera earned a silver medal in the Men's sprint - sitting. Ribera's achievement also represented the first medal for a tropical nation and South America at the Winter Games.

== Medal tables ==
=== Medals by Summer Games ===
This are the historical medal table for Brasil at the Summer Paralympics. This medal table also includes the 5 medals (1 gold, 3 silvers and 1 bronze) won at the 1992 Summer Paralympics for Intellectually Disabled, held in Madrid, who also organized by then International Coordenation Committee (ICC) and same Organizing Committee (COOB'92) who made the gestion of the 1992 Summer Paralympics held in Barcelona and also part of same event. But the results are not on the International Paralympic Committee 's (IPC) database.

Games	Athletes	Gold	Silver	Bronze	Total	Rank
(Italy) 1960 Rome	did not participate					
(Japan) 1964 Tokyo	did not participate					
(Israel) 1968 Tel-Aviv	did not participate					
(West Germany) 1972 Heidelberg	8	0	0	0	0	–
(Canada) 1976 Toronto	23	0	1	0	1	31
(Netherlands) 1980 Arnhem	2	0	0	0	0	–
(United Kingdom) 1984 Stoke Mandeville (United States) 1984 New York	30	7	17	4	28	24
(South Korea) 1988 Seoul	59	4	9	14	27	24
(Spain) 1992 Barcelona-Madrid	41	4	3	5	12	28
(United States) 1996 Atlanta	60	2	6	13	21	37
(Australia) 2000 Sydney	63	6	10	6	22	24
(Greece) 2004 Athens	96	14	12	7	33	14
(China) 2008 Beijing	187	16	14	17	47	9
(United Kingdom) 2012 London	181	21	14	8	43	7
(Brazil) 2016 Rio de Janeiro	285	14	29	29	72	8
(Japan) 2020 Tokyo	258	22	20	30	72	7
(France) 2024 Paris	255	25	25	38	88	5
(United States) 2028 Los Angeles	Future event					
(Australia) 2032 Brisbane	Future event					
Total	1,264	135	160	171	466	16

=== Medals by Winter Games ===
Games	Athletes	Gold	Silver	Bronze	Total	Rank
(Sweden) 1976 Örnsköldsvik	did not participate					
(Norway) 1980 Geilo	did not participate					
(Austria) 1984 Innsbruck	did not participate					
(Austria) 1988 Innsbruck	did not participate					
(France) 1992 Tignes-Albertville	did not participate					
(Norway) 1994 Lillehammer	did not participate					
(Japan) 1998 Nagano	did not participate					
(United States) 2002 Salt Lake City	did not participate					
(Italy) 2006 Turin	did not participate					
(Canada) 2010 Vancouver	did not participate					
(Russia) 2014 Sochi	2	0	0	0	0	–
(South Korea) 2018 PyeongChang	3	0	0	0	0	–
(China) 2022 Beijing	6	0	0	0	0	–
(Italy) 2026 Milano Cortina	8	0	1	0	1	23
(France) 2030 French Alps
(United States) 2034 Salt Lake City
Total	19	0	1	0	1	32

=== Medals by Summer Sports (1972–2024) ===
Leading in that sport

Sport	Gold	Silver	Bronze	Total
Athletics	59	84	67	210
Swimming	47	48	56	151
Judo	9	11	13	33
Boccia	6	1	4	11
Football 5-a-side	5	0	1	6
Powerlifting	3	1	2	6
Paracanoeing	2	4	2	8
Parataekwondo	2	1	2	5
Goalball	1	1	3	5
Wheelchair fencing	1	1	0	2
Table tennis	0	3	9	12
Equestrian	0	1	4	5
Football 7-a-side	0	1	2	3
Cycling	0	1	1	2
Lawn bowls	0	1	0	1
Shooting	0	1	0	1
Rowing	0	0	2	2
Volleyball	0	0	2	2
Badminton	0	0	1	1
Totals (19 entries)	135	160	171	466

=== Medals by Winter Sports (2014–2026) ===
Leading in that sport

Sport	Gold	Silver	Bronze	Total
Cross-country skiing	0	1	0	1
Totals (1 entries)	0	1	0	1

=== Best results in non-medalling sports ===
Summer
Sport	Rank	Athlete	Event & Year
Archery	4th	Luciano Rezende	Men's individual recurve open in 2016
Paratriathlon	4th	Jéssica Messali	Women's PTWC in 2020
Wheelchair basketball	5th	Brazil men's team	Men's tournament in 2016
Wheelchair rugby	8th	Brazil mixed team	Mixed tournament in 2016
Wheelchair tennis	4th	Leandro Pena & Ymanitu Silva	Quad doubles in 2024
Winter
Sport	Rank	Athlete	Event & Year
Alpine skiing	28th	André Pereira	Men's snowboard cross in 2014
Biathlon	7th	Aline Rocha	Women's sprint, sitting in 2026
Para ice hockey	Did not participate		
Snowboarding	10th	André Cintra	Men's banked slalom SB-LL1 in 2018
Snowboarding	10th	André Cintra	Men's snowboard cross SB-LL1 in 2018
Wheelchair curling	Did not participate		

== Flagbearers ==
Summer Paralympics
Games	Athlete	Sport
(Italy) 1960 Rome	did not participate	
(Japan) 1964 Tokyo	did not participate	
(Israel) 1968 Tel-Aviv	did not participate	
(West Germany) 1972 Heidelberg	Not documented	
(Canada) 1976 Toronto	Not documented	
(Netherlands) 1980 Arnhem	Not documented	
(United States) 1984 New York (United Kingdom) 1984 Stoke Mandeville	Not documented	
(South Korea) 1988 Seoul	Not documented	
(Spain) 1992 Barcelona	Not documented	
(United States) 1996 Atlanta	Anderson Santos	Para athletics
(Australia) 2000 Sydney	Ádria Santos	Para athletics
(Australia) 2000 Sydney	Luís Silva	Para swimming
(Greece) 2004 Athens	Clodoaldo Silva	Para swimming
(China) 2008 Beijing	Antônio Tenório	Para judo
(United Kingdom) 2012 London	Daniel Dias	Para swimming
(Brazil) 2016 Rio de Janeiro	Shirlene Coelho	Para athletics
(Japan) 2020 Tokyo	Evelyn de Oliveira	Boccia
(Japan) 2020 Tokyo	Petrúcio Ferreira	Para athletics
(France) 2024 Paris	Elizabeth Gomes	Para athletics
(France) 2024 Paris	Gabriel Araújo	Para swimming

Winter Paralympics
Games	Athlete	Sport
(Sweden) 1976 Örnsköldsvik	did not participate	
(Norway) 1980 Geilo	did not participate	
(Austria) 1984 Innsbruck	did not participate	
(Austria) 1988 Innsbruck	did not participate	
(France) 1992 Tignes-Albertville	did not participate	
(Norway) 1994 Lillehammer	did not participate	
(Japan) 1998 Nagano	did not participate	
(United States) 2002 Salt Lake City	did not participate	
(Italy) 2006 Turin	did not participate	
(Canada) 2010 Vancouver	did not participate	
(Russia) 2014 Sochi	André Pereira	Para alpine skiing
(South Korea) 2018 PyeongChang	Aline Rocha	Para cross-country skiing
(China) 2022 Beijing	Cristian Ribera	Para cross-country skiing
(China) 2022 Beijing	Aline Rocha	Para cross-country skiing
(Italy) 2026 Milano Cortina	Cristian Ribera	Para cross-country skiing
(Italy) 2026 Milano Cortina	Aline Rocha	Para biathlon & para cross-country skiing

== Multi-medalists ==
Brazilian athletes who have won at least three gold medals or five or more medals of any colour.

No.	Athlete	Sport	Years	Games	Gender	Gold	Silver	Bronze	Total
1	Daniel Dias	Swimming	2008-2020	4	M	14	7	6	27
2	André Brasil	Swimming	2008-2016	3	M	7	5	2	14
3	Clodoaldo Silva	Swimming	2000-2016	5	M	6	5	2	13
4	Carol Santiago	Swimming	2020-2024	2	F	6	3	1	10
5	Luiz Cláudio Pereira	Athletics	1984-1992	3	M	6	3	0	9
6	Gabriel Araújo	Swimming	2020-2024	2	M	5	1	0	6
7	Ádria Santos	Athletics	1988-2008	6	F	4	7	1	12
8	Antônio Tenório Silva	Judo	1996-2016	6	M	4	1	1	6
9	Dirceu Pinto	Boccia	2008-2016	3	M	4	1	0	5
10	Jefinho	Football	2008-2024	5	M	4	0	1	5
10	Ricardinho	Football	2008-2024	5	M	4	0	1	5
12	Damião Robson	Football	2004-2020	4	M	4	0	0	4
12	Marcos Felipe	Football	2004-2016	4	M	4	0	0	4
14	Terezinha Guilhermina	Athletics	2004-2016	4	F	3	2	3	8
15	Petrúcio Ferreira	Athletics	2016-2024	3	M	3	2	0	5
15	Lucas Prado	Athletics	2008-2016	3	M	3	2	0	5
17	Claudiney Batista	Athletics	2012-2024	4	M	3	1	0	4
18	Cássio Reis	Football	2012-2024	4	M	3	0	1	4
18	Raimundo Nonato	Football	2012-2024	4	M	3	0	1	4
18	Yeltsin Jacques	Athletics	2016-2024	3	M	3	0	1	4
21	Fábio Vasconcelos	Football	2004-2012	3	M	3	0	0	3
21	Gledson Barros	Football	2012-2020	3	M	3	0	0	3
21	Severino da Silva	Football	2004-2012	3	M	3	0	0	3
24	Felipe Gomes	Athletics	2008-2024	5	M	2	3	1	6
25	Talisson Glock	Swimming	2016-2024	3	M	2	2	5	9
26	Jerusa Geber dos Santos	Athletics	2008-2024	5	F	2	2	2	6
27	Luis Silva	Swimming	2000-2008	3	M	1	5	1	7
28	Miracema Ferraz	Athletics	1984	1	F	1	5	0	6
29	Adriano Lima	Swimming	1996-2012	5	M	1	4	3	8
30	Gabriel Bandeira	Swimming	2020-2024	2	M	1	3	3	7
31	Yohansson Nascimento	Athletics	2008-2016	3	M	1	3	1	5
32	Phelipe Rodrigues	Swimming	2008-2024	5	M	0	6	3	9
33	Odair Santos	Athletics	2004-2016	4	M	0	5	4	9

== See also ==
- Brazil at the Olympics
