= Brazil at the 1984 Summer Paralympics =

- IPC code: BRA
- NPC: Brazilian Paralympic Committee
- Website: www.cpb.org.br

in Stoke Mandeville/New York
- Competitors: 30
- Medals Ranked 24th: Gold 7 Silver 17 Bronze 4 Total 28

Summer Paralympics appearances (overview)
- 1972; 1976; 1980; 1984; 1988; 1992; 1996; 2000; 2004; 2008; 2012; 2016; 2020; 2024

Brazil competed at the 1984 Summer Paralympics in Stoke Mandeville, Great Britain and New York City, United States. 30 competitors from Brazil won 28 medals including 7 gold, 17 silver and 4 bronze and finished 24th in the medal table.

== Medallists ==
Medal	Name	Sport	Event
Gold	Luiz Cláudio Pereira	Athletics	Men's javelin throw 1C
Gold	Luiz Cláudio Pereira	Athletics	Men's shot put 1C
Gold	Marcia Malsar	Athletics	Women's 200 m C6
Gold	Amintas Piedade	Athletics	Women's javelin throw 1C
Gold	Amintas Piedade	Athletics	Women's shot put 1C
Gold	Miracema Ferraz	Athletics	Women's shot put 1A
Gold	Maria Jussara Matos	Swimming	Women's 200m medley 6
Silver	Luiz Cláudio Pereira	Athletics	Men's discus throw 1C
Silver	Luiz Cláudio Pereira	Athletics	Men's pentathlon 1C
Silver	Anelise Hermany	Athletics	Women's 100 m B2
Silver	Anelise Hermany	Athletics	Women's long jump B2
Silver	Miracema Ferraz	Athletics	Women's 100 m 1A
Silver	Miracema Ferraz	Athletics	Women's 200 m 1A
Silver	Miracema Ferraz	Athletics	Women's 400 m 1A
Silver	Miracema Ferraz	Athletics	Women's 800 m 1A
Silver	Miracema Ferraz	Athletics	Women's slalom 1B
Silver	Marcia Malsar	Athletics	Women's 1000 m cross country C6
Silver	Amintas Piedade	Athletics	Women's discus throw 1C
Silver	Amintas Piedade	Athletics	Women's slalom 1C
Silver	Marcelo Amorim	Swimming	Men's 100 m backstroke 5
Silver	Marcelo Amorim	Swimming	Men's 100 m breaststroke 5
Silver	Marcelo Amorim	Swimming	Men's 200 m medley 5
Silver	Maria Jussara Matos	Swimming	Women's 100 m backstroke 6
Silver	Maria Jussara Matos	Swimming	Women's 100 m freestyle 6
Bronze	Jorge Graciano	Athletics	Men's 100 m 3
Bronze	Marcia Malsar	Athletics	Women's 60 m C6
Bronze	Anelise Hermany	Athletics	Women's 800 m B2
Bronze	Marcelo Amorim	Swimming	Men's 100 m freestyle 5

== Medallists ==
Medals by sport
Sport	1st place, gold medalist(s)	2nd place, silver medalist(s)	3rd place, bronze medalist(s)	Total
Athletics	6	12	3	21
Swimming	1	5	1	7
Total	7	17	4	28

Medals by gender
Gender	Gold medal	Silver medal	Bronze medal	Total
Male	2	5	2	9
Female	5	12	2	19
Mixed	0	0	0	0
Total	7	17	4	28

== See also ==
- Brazil at the Paralympics
- Brazil at the 1984 Summer Olympics
