= Brazil at the 1996 Summer Paralympics =

- IPC code: BRA
- NPC: Brazilian Paralympic Committee
- Website: www.cpb.org.br

in Atlanta
- Competitors: 60 (41 men and 19 women)
- Medals Ranked 37th: Gold 2 Silver 6 Bronze 13 Total 21

Summer Paralympics appearances (overview)
- 1972; 1976; 1980; 1984; 1988; 1992; 1996; 2000; 2004; 2008; 2012; 2016; 2020; 2024

60 athletes (41 men and 19 women) from Brazil competed at the 1996 Summer Paralympics in Atlanta, United States.

== Medallists ==
Medal	Name	Sport	Event
Gold	Antônio Tenório	Judo	Men's 86kg
Gold	José Arnulfo Medeiros	Swimming	Men's 50m butterfly S7
Silver	Douglas Amador	Athletics	Men's 200m T37
Silver	Josias Lima	Athletics	Men's shot put F52
Silver	Ádria Santos	Athletics	Women's 100m T10
Silver	Ádria Santos	Athletics	Women's 200m T10
Silver	Ádria Santos	Athletics	Women's 400m T10
Silver	Genezi Andrade	Swimming	Men's 150m medley SM3
Bronze	Douglas Amador	Athletics	Men's 100m T37
Bronze	Douglas Amador	Athletics	Men's long jump F34-37
Bronze	Anderson Santos	Athletics	Men's discus F36
Bronze	Maria José Alves	Athletics	Women's 100m T11
Bronze	Maria José Alves	Athletics	Women's 200m T11
Bronze	Suely Guimarães	Athletics	Women's discus F55-57
Bronze	Adriano Pereira	Swimming	Men's 50m freestyle S2
Bronze	Adriano Lima	Swimming	Men's 50m freestyle S6
Bronze	Ivanildo Vasconcelos	Swimming	Men's 100m breaststroke SB4
Bronze	Adriano Pereira	Swimming	Men's 100m freestyle S2
Bronze	Genezi Andrade	Swimming	Men's 100m freestyle S3
Bronze	Genezi Andrade	Swimming	Men's 200m freestyle S3
Bronze	Gledson Soares	Swimming	Men's 200m medley SM7

Medals by sport
Sport	1st place, gold medalist(s)	2nd place, silver medalist(s)	3rd place, bronze medalist(s)	Total
Swimming	1	1	7	9
Judo	1	0	0	1
Athletics	0	5	6	11
Total	2	6	13	21

Medals by gender
Gender	Gold medal	Silver medal	Bronze medal	Total
Male	2	3	10	15
Female	0	3	3	6
Mixed	0	0	0	0
Total	2	6	13	21

== See also ==
- Brazil at the Paralympics
- Brazil at the 1996 Summer Olympics
