= Brazil at the 1988 Summer Paralympics =

- IPC code: BRA
- NPC: Brazilian Paralympic Committee
- Website: www.cpb.org.br

in Seoul
- Competitors: 59
- Medals Ranked 26th: Gold 4 Silver 9 Bronze 14 Total 27

Summer Paralympics appearances (overview)
- 1972; 1976; 1980; 1984; 1988; 1992; 1996; 2000; 2004; 2008; 2012; 2016; 2020; 2024

Brazil competed at the 1988 Summer Paralympics in Seoul, South Korea. 59 competitors from Brazil won 27 medals including 4 gold, 9 silver and 14 bronze and finished 26th in the medal table.

== Medallists ==
Medal	Name	Sport	Event
Gold	Luiz Cláudio Pereira	Athletics	Men's discus throw 1C
Gold	Luiz Cláudio Pereira	Athletics	Men's javelin throw 1C
Gold	Luiz Cláudio Pereira	Athletics	Men's shot put 1C
Gold	Graciana Moreira Alves	Swimming	Women's 100 m freestyle 6
Silver	César Antônio Gualberto	Athletics	Men's 400 m B1
Silver	Elmo Ribeiro	Athletics	Men's 400 m B2
Silver	Claudio Nunes Silva	Athletics	Men's javelin throw C6
Silver	Luiz Cláudio Pereira	Athletics	Men's pentathlon 1C
Silver	Ádria Santos	Athletics	Women's 100 m B2
Silver	Ádria Santos	Athletics	Women's 400 m B2
Silver	Marcia Malsar	Athletics	Women's 100 m C6
Silver	Anelise Hermany	Athletics	Women's 800 m B2
Silver	Maria Jussara Matos	Swimming	Women's 100 m butterfly 6
Bronze	Iranilson Oliveira	Athletics	Men's 100 m 5–6
Bronze	Carlos Roberto Sestrem	Athletics	Men's marathon B1
Bronze	Sebastião Antônio Neto	Athletics	Men's shot put C6
Bronze	Anelise Hermany	Athletics	Women's 400 m B2
Bronze	Fábio Ricci	Swimming	Men's 100 m freestyle 1C
Bronze	Fábio Ricci	Swimming	Men's 25 m backstroke 1C
Bronze	Fábio Ricci	Swimming	Men's 25 m breaststroke 1C
Bronze	Leandro Ramos Santos	Swimming	Men's 100 m butterfly L6
Bronze	Maria Jussara Matos	Swimming	Women's 100 m freestyle 6
Bronze	Graciana Moreira Alves	Swimming	Women's 100 m breaststroke 6
Bronze	Graciana Moreira Alves	Swimming	Women's 100 m butterfly 6
Bronze	Jaime De Oliveira	Judo	Men's 60 kg
Bronze	Júlio Silva	Judo	Men's 65 kg
Bronze	Leonel Cunha Moraes Filho	Judo	Men's +95 kg

Medals by sport
Sport	1st place, gold medalist(s)	2nd place, silver medalist(s)	3rd place, bronze medalist(s)	Total
Athletics	3	8	4	15
Swimming	1	1	7	9
Judo	0	0	3	1
Total	4	9	14	27

Medals by gender
Gender	Gold medal	Silver medal	Bronze medal	Total
Male	3	4	10	17
Female	1	5	4	10
Mixed	0	0	0	0
Total	4	9	14	27

== See also ==
- Brazil at the Paralympics
- Brazil at the 1988 Summer Olympics
