= Brazil at the 1992 Summer Paralympics =

- IPC code: BRA
- NPC: Brazilian Paralympic Committee
- Website: www.cpb.org.br

in Barcelona and Madrid
- Competitors: 41
- Medals Ranked 28th: Gold 4 Silver 3 Bronze 5 Total 12

Summer Paralympics appearances (overview)
- 1972; 1976; 1980; 1984; 1988; 1992; 1996; 2000; 2004; 2008; 2012; 2016; 2020; 2024

Brazil competed at the 1992 Paralympic Games in Barcelona for physically and vision-impaired athletes. Immediately after the Barcelona Games, the city of Madrid held events for athletes with an intellectual disability. The Madrid results are not included in International Paralympic Committee Historical Results Database. In Barcelona, Brazil finished 31st in the total medal count winning 7 medals (3 gold and 4 bronzes). At the Catalan city, the country has competed with 41 athletes and won medals in 3 sports – swimming, athletics and judo. Brazil finished thirteenth in Madrid with 1 gold, 3 silvers and 1 bronze, totalizing a total of another 5 medals and finished the games at the 28th place.

== Medallists ==
The following medals were earned in Barcelona and are recognized by the International Paralympic Committee and the Brazilian Paralympic Committee.

Medal	Name	Sport	Event
Gold	Ádria Santos	Athletics	Women's 100 m B2
Gold	Suely Guimarães	Athletics	Women's discus throw THW7
Gold	Luiz Cláudio Pereira	Athletics	Men's shot put THW4
Bronze	Sebastião da Costa Neto	Athletics	Men's Club throw C6
Bronze	Genezi Andrade	Swimming	Men's 50 m backstroke S3
Bronze	Eduardo Wanderley	Swimming	Men's 50 m butterfly S3–4
Bronze	Ivanildo Vasconcelos	Swimming	Men's 200 m individual medley SM5

The following medals were earned by Brazilians with intellectual impairment in Madrid and are not officially recognized by either the International Paralympic Committee or the Brazilian Paralympic Committee.

Medal	Name	Sport	Event
Gold	Joel da Silva	Athletics	Men's 400 m
Silver	Joel da Silva	Athletics	Men's 100 m
Silver	Haroldo Ribeiro	Athletics	Men's shot put
Silver	Ester Ramos Pereira	Athletics	Women's long jump
Bronze	Luciângela Souza da Cruz; Ester Ramos Pereira; Beresia Souza; Erinude da Costa	Athletics	Women's 4×100 metres relay

Medals by sport
Sport	1st place, gold medalist(s)	2nd place, silver medalist(s)	3rd place, bronze medalist(s)	Total
Athletics	4	3	2	9
Swimming	0	0	3	3
Total	4	3	5	12

Medals by gender
Gender	Gold medal	Silver medal	Bronze medal	Total
Male	2	2	4	8
Female	2	1	1	4
Mixed	0	0	0	0
Total	4	3	5	12

== See also ==
- Brazil at the Paralympics
- Brazil at the 1992 Summer Olympics
