= Brazil at the 2012 Summer Paralympics =

- IPC code: BRA
- NPC: Brazilian Paralympic Committee
- Website: www.cpb.org.br

in London
- Competitors: 189 in 18 sports
- Flag bearer: Daniel Dias
- Medals Ranked 7th: Gold 21 Silver 14 Bronze 8 Total 43

Summer Paralympics appearances (overview)
- 1972; 1976; 1980; 1984; 1988; 1992; 1996; 2000; 2004; 2008; 2012; 2016; 2020; 2024

Brazil competed at the 2012 Summer Paralympics in London, United Kingdom, from 29 August to 9 September 2012. Brazil was the next host of the Summer Paralympics, holding the 2016 Games in Rio de Janeiro. A Brazilian segment was performed in Closing Ceremony.

== Medalists ==
Medal	Name	Sport	Event	Date
Gold	Felipe Gomes; Guide: Leonardo Souza Lopes	Athletics	Men's 200 metres T11	4 September
Gold	Alan Fonteles Cardoso Oliveira	Athletics	Men's 200 metres T44	2 September
Gold	Yohansson Nascimento	Athletics	Men's 200 metres T46	2 September
Gold	Tito Sena	Athletics	Men's marathon T46	8 September
Gold	Terezinha Guilhermina; Guide: Guilherme Soares de Santana	Athletics	Women's 100 metres T11	5 September
Gold	Terezinha Guilhermina; Guide: Guilherme Soares de Santana	Athletics	Women's 200 metres T11	2 September
Gold	Shirlene Coelho	Athletics	Women's javelin throw F37/38	8 September
Gold	Maciel Sousa Santos	Boccia	Individual BC2	8 September
Gold	Dirceu Pinto	Boccia	Individual BC4	8 September
Gold	Dirceu Pinto; Eliseu dos Santos	Boccia	Pairs BC4	4 September
Gold	Brazil's football 5-a-side team	Football 5-a-side	Men's team	8 September
Gold	Daniel Dias	Swimming	Men's 50 metre backstroke S5	6 September
Gold	Daniel Dias	Swimming	Men's 50 metre butterfly S5	7 September
Gold	Daniel Dias	Swimming	Men's 50 metre freestyle S5	30 August
Gold	André Brasil	Swimming	Men's 50 metre freestyle S10	31 August
Gold	André Brasil	Swimming	Men's 100 metre butterfly S10	1 September
Gold	Daniel Dias	Swimming	Men's 100 metre freestyle S5	8 September
Gold	André Brasil	Swimming	Men's 100 metre freestyle S10	6 September
Gold	Daniel Dias	Swimming	Men's 200 metre freestyle S5	1 September
Gold	Daniel Dias	Swimming	Men's 100 metre breaststroke SB4	4 September
Gold	Jovane Silva Guissone	Wheelchair fencing	Men's épée B	5 September
Silver	Lucas Prado; Guide: Justino Barbosa dos Santos	Athletics	Men's 100 metres T11	8 September
Silver	Daniel Silva; Guide: Heitor de Oliveira Sales	Athletics	Men's 200 metres T11	4 September
Silver	Lucas Prado; Guide: Laercio Alves Martins	Athletics	Men's 400 metres T11	7 September
Silver	Yohansson Nascimento	Athletics	Men's 400 metres T46	4 September
Silver	Odair Santos; Guide: Carlos Antonio dos Santos	Athletics	Men's 1500 metres T11	3 September
Silver	Claudiney Batista dos Santos	Athletics	Men's javelin throw F57/58	8 September
Silver	Jerusa Geber Santos; Guide: Luiz Henrique Barboza Da Silva	Athletics	Women's 100 metres T11	5 September
Silver	Jerusa Geber Santos; Guide: Luiz Henrique Barboza Da Silva	Athletics	Women's 200 metres T11	2 September
Silver	Romário Diego Marques; José Ferreira de Oliveira; Almeida Maciel Celente; Leandro Moreno da Silva; Leomon Moreno da Silva; Filippe Santos Silvestre	Goalball	Men's team	9 September
Silver	Lúcia da Silva Teixeira	Judo	Women's 57 kg	31 August
Silver	André Brasil	Swimming	Men's 100 metre backstroke S10	4 September
Silver	Phelipe Andrews Melo Rodrigues	Swimming	Men's 100 metre freestyle S10	6 September
Silver	André Brasil	Swimming	Men's 200 metre individual medley SM10	30 August
Silver	Edenia Garcia	Swimming	Women's 50 metre backstroke S4	5 September
Bronze	Felipe Gomes; Guide: Leonardo Souza Lopes	Athletics	Men's 100 metres T11	8 September
Bronze	Jonathan De Souza Santos	Athletics	Men's discus throw F40	4 September
Bronze	Jhulia Santos; Guide: Fabio Dias de Oliveira Silva	Athletics	Women's 100 metres T11	5 September
Bronze	Eliseu dos Santos	Boccia	Individual BC4	8 September
Bronze	Antônio Tenório Silva	Judo	Men's 100 kg	1 September
Bronze	Michele Ferreira	Judo	Women's 52 kg	30 August
Bronze	Daniele Bernardes Milan	Judo	Women's 63 kg	31 August
Bronze	Joana Maria Silva	Swimming	Women's 50 metre butterfly S5	7 September

Medals by sport
Sport	1st place, gold medalist(s)	2nd place, silver medalist(s)	3rd place, bronze medalist(s)	Total
Swimming	9	4	1	14
Athletics	7	8	3	18
Boccia	3	0	1	4
Football 5-a-side	1	0	0	1
Wheelchair fencing	1	0	0	1
Judo	0	1	3	4
Goalball	0	1	0	1
Total	21	14	8	43

Medals by gender
Gender	Gold medal	Silver medal	Bronze medal	Total
Male	15	10	3	28
Female	3	4	4	11
Mixed	3	0	1	4
Total	21	14	8	43

== Athletics ==
Key

- Note – Ranks given for track events are within the athlete's heat only
- DQ = Disqualified
- DNS = Did not start
- Q = Qualified for the next round
- q = Qualified for the next round as a fastest loser
- WR = World record
- PR = Paralympic record
- NR = National record
- N/A = Round not applicable for the event
- Bye = Athlete not required to compete in round

Men

Track events

Athlete	Events	Heat		Semi-final		Final	
Athlete	Events	Time	Rank	Time	Rank	Time	Rank
André Andrade	100 m T13	11.22	7 q	—N/a		11.28	8
André Andrade	200 m T13	22.96	10	—N/a		did not advance	
André Andrade	400 m T13	54.90	11	—N/a		did not advance	
Édson Pinheiro	100 m T38	—N/a				11.57	5
Édson Pinheiro	200 m T38	23.87	7 Q	—N/a		–	DNS
Édson Pinheiro	400 m T38	–	DQ	—N/a		did not advance	
Lucas Ferrari	100 m T37	12.18	11=	—N/a		did not advance	
Lucas Ferrari	200 m T37	25.51	10	—N/a		did not advance	
Alan Fonteles Cardoso Oliveira	100 m T44	11.56	7 q	—N/a		11.33	7
Alan Fonteles Cardoso Oliveira	200 m T44	21.88	2 Q	—N/a		21.45	1st place, gold medalist(s)
Alan Fonteles Cardoso Oliveira	400 m T44	53.02	5 Q	—N/a		51.59	4
Yohansson Nascimento	100 m T46	10.94 WR	1 Q	—N/a		1:30.79	8
Yohansson Nascimento	200 m T46	22.27	2 Q	—N/a		22.05	1st place, gold medalist(s)
Yohansson Nascimento	400 m T46	50.18	5 Q	—N/a		49.21	2nd place, silver medalist(s)
Antônio Souza	100 m T46	11.36	12	—N/a		did not advance	
Antônio Souza	200 m T46	–	DNS	—N/a		did not advance	
Emicarlo Souza	200 m T46	23.01	9	—N/a		did not advance	
Emicarlo Souza	400 m T46	50.40	7 q	—N/a		50.74	6
Odair Santos	1500 m T11	4:14.95	3 Q	—N/a		4:03.66	2nd place, silver medalist(s)
Carlos J Bartô Silva	400 m T11	56.83	10	—N/a		did not advance	
Carlos J Bartô Silva	800 m T11	2:06.69	10	—N/a		did not advance	
Carlos J Bartô Silva	1500 m T11	4:25.36	9	—N/a		did not advance	
Ozivam Bonfim	Marathon T46	—N/a				2:37:16	4
Tito Sena	Marathon T46	—N/a				2:30:40	1st place, gold medalist(s)
Felipe Gomes	100 m T11	11.32	2 Q	11.20	3 Q	11.27	3rd place, bronze medalist(s)
Felipe Gomes	200 m T11	22.99	2 Q	22.97	4 Q	22.97	1st place, gold medalist(s)
André Oliveira	100 m T44	12.35	16	—N/a		did not advance	
Daniel Silva	100 m T11	11.43	6= Q	–	DNS	did not advance	
Daniel Silva	200 m T11	23.29	5 Q	22.84	1= Q	22.99	2nd place, silver medalist(s)
Daniel Silva	400 m T11	51.41	1 Q	—N/a		–	DNS
Ariosvaldo Fernandes Silva	100 m T53	15.22	5 Q	—N/a		15.31	4
Ariosvaldo Fernandes Silva	200 m T53	26.61	5 Q	—N/a		26.83	8
Ariosvaldo Fernandes Silva	400 m T53	52.44	10	—N/a		did not advance	
Lucas Prado	100 m T11	11.43	6= q	11.15	1 Q	11.25	2nd place, silver medalist(s)
Lucas Prado	200 m T11	22.96	1 Q	22.92	q	23.15	4
Lucas Prado	400 m T11	52.00	2 Q	—N/a		51.44	2nd place, silver medalist(s)
Thierb Siqueira	200 m T12	23.60	17	did not advance			
Thierb Siqueira	400 m T12	50.80	3 q	–	DQ	did not advance	
Thierb Siqueira	800 m T12	–	DNS	—N/a		did not advance	
André Andrade; Felipe Gomes; Edson Pinheiro; Lucas Prado; Daniel Silva; Thierb Siqueira	4 × 100 m relay T11-T13	–	DQ	—N/a		did not advance	
Yohansson Nascimento; Antônio Souza; Emicarlo Souza; André Oliveira; Alan Fonteles Cardoso Oliveira; Claudemir Santos	4 × 100 m relay T42-T46	–	DQ	—N/a		did not advance	

Field events

Athlete	Event	Points	Mark	Rank
Vanderson Alves da Silva	Shot put F57-58	608	9.94	15
Vanderson Alves da Silva	Discus throw F57-58	667	35.81	13
Jonathan De Souza Santos	Shot put F40	—N/a	10.88	7
Jonathan De Souza Santos	Discus throw F40	—N/a	40.49	3rd place, bronze medalist(s)
André Oliveira	Long jump F42-44	739	6.12	8
Flávio Reitz	High jump F42	—N/a	1.68	5
Luciano dos Santos Pereira	Triple jump F11	—N/a	11.02	9
Luciano dos Santos Pereira	Shot put F11-12	632	9.29	20
Luciano dos Santos Pereira	Discus throw F11	—N/a	29.31	7
Marco Aurélio Borges	Discus throw F44	—N/a	45.52	6
Paulo Souza	Discus throw F35-36	—N/a	32.86	9
Claudiney Batista dos Santos	Shot put F57-58	902	12.87	7
Claudiney Batista dos Santos	Discus throw F57-58	931	45.90	4
Claudiney Batista dos Santos	Javelin throw F57-58	1024	45.38	2nd place, silver medalist(s)

Women

Track events

Athlete	Events	Heat		Semi-final		Final	
Athlete	Events	Time	Rank	Time	Rank	Time	Rank
Terezinha Guilhermina	100 m T11	12.23 PR	1 Q	—N/a		12.01 WR	1st place, gold medalist(s)
Terezinha Guilhermina	200 m T11	24.89	1 Q	24.92	1 Q	24.82 PR	1st place, gold medalist(s)
Terezinha Guilhermina	400 m T11	1:00.01	5 q	58.41	3 q	1:39.73	4
Alice de Oliveira Corrêa	100 m T12	12.81	10 Q	13.02	10	did not advance	
Alice de Oliveira Corrêa	200 m T12	25.92	6	—N/a		did not advance	
Sheila Finder	100 m T46	13.13	5 Q	—N/a		13.33	5
Jenifer Santos	100 m T38	14.66	7 q	—N/a		14.87	8
Jenifer Santos	200 m T38	32.03	11	—N/a		did not advance	
Jerusa Geber Santos	100 m T11	12.68	2 Q	—N/a		12.75	2nd place, silver medalist(s)
Jerusa Geber Santos	200 m T11	26.96	3 Q	26.64	3 q	26.32	2nd place, silver medalist(s)
Jerusa Geber Santos	400 m T11	–	DQ	did not advance			
Jhulia Santos	100 m T11	12.88	4 Q	—N/a		12.76	3rd place, bronze medalist(s)
Jhulia Santos	200 m T11	27.01	4 Q	26.70	4 q	26.65	4
Joana Helena Silva	100 m T13	–	DNS	—N/a		did not advance	
Joana Helena Silva	400 m T13	—N/a				–	DNF
Viviane Soares	100 m T13	13.22	8 q	—N/a		13.02	6
Viviane Soares	400 m T13	—N/a				1:05.96	7

== Boccia ==
=== Individual matches ===
Athlete	Event	Seeding matches	Round of 32	Round of 16	Quarterfinals	Semifinals	Finals	
Athlete	Event	Opposition Score	Opposition Score	Opposition Score	Opposition Score	Opposition Score	Opposition Score	Rank
José Carlos Chagas de Oliveira	Mixed individual BC1	—N/a	Nagy (SVK); W 4-2	Ji (KOR); W 3-3	Kim M-S (KOR); W 7-1	Tadtong (THA); L 2-5	Bronze medal match Aandalen (NOR); L 4-6	4
Natali Mello de Faria	Mixed individual BC2	—N/a	Hirose (JPN); L 0-12	did not advance				
Maciel Sousa Santos	Mixed individual BC2	—N/a	Cordero Martin (ESP); W 9-1	Dukovich (CAN); W 9-3	Sohn (KOR); W 5-5	Zhong K (CHN); W 7-1	Yan Z (CHN); W 8-0	1st place, gold medalist(s)
Daniele Martins	Mixed individual BC3	Hagdahl (SWE); W 6-2	Visaratanunta (THA); W 7-2	A Costa (POR); L 1-11	did not advance			
Dirceu Pinto	Mixed individual BC4	—N/a		Lacina (CZE); W 4-2	P McGuire (GBR); W 3-3	dos Santos (BRA); W 4-2	Zheng Y (CHN); W 3-3	1st place, gold medalist(s)
Eliseu dos Santos	Mixed individual BC4	—N/a		Vandervies (CAN); W 8-1	Yuk W L (HKG); W 4-2	Pinto (BRA); L 2-4	Bronze medal match S McGuire (GBR); W 5-3	3rd place, bronze medalist(s)

=== Pairs and team events ===
Athlete	Event	Pool matches				Quarterfinals	Semifinals	Finals	
Athlete	Event	Opposition Score	Opposition Score	Opposition Score	Rank	Opposition Score	Opposition Score	Opposition Score	Rank
Dirceu Pinto; Eliseu dos Santos	Pairs BC4	Lacina (CZE) / Procházka (CZE); W 9-0	Lau (HKG) / Yuk W L (HKG); W 7-4	Barroso (POR) / Vieira (POR); W 10-0	1 Q	—N/a	P McGuire (GBR) / S McGuire (GBR); W 3-2	Lacina (CZE) / Procházka (CZE); W 5-3	1st place, gold medalist(s)
José Carlos Chagas de Oliveira; Luísa Lisboa dos Reis; Natali Mello de Faria; Maciel Sousa Santos	Mixed team BC1-2	South Korea (KOR); L 3-10	Ireland (IRL); W 11-2	—N/a	2 Q	Thailand (THA); L 1-11	did not advance		

== Cycling ==
Men's track

Athlete	Event	Time	Rank
Soelito Gohr	Men's road race C4-5	1:55.51	5
Soelito Gohr	Men's road time trial C5	33:53.36	7
Joao Alberto Schwindt Filho	Men's road race C4-5	1:55.51	4
Joao Alberto Schwindt Filho	Men's road time trial C5	35:03.39	9

Men's track

Athlete	Event	Qualification		1st round		Final	
Athlete	Event	Time	Rank	Time	Rank	Opposition Time	Rank
Soelito Gohr	Men's individual pursuit C5	4:58.061	11	did not advance			
Joao Alberto Schwindt Filho	Men's 1km time trial C4-5	—N/a				1:11.259	12
Joao Alberto Schwindt Filho	Men's individual pursuit C5	4:46.553	6	did not advance			

== Equestrian ==
Individual events

Athlete	Horse	Event	Total	
Athlete	Horse	Event	Score	Rank
Marcos Fernandes Alves	Luthenay de Vernay	Individual championship test grade Ib	62.609	14
Marcos Fernandes Alves	Luthenay de Vernay	Individual freestyle test grade Ib	67.800	10
Sergio Froes Ribeiro de Oliva	Emily	Individual championship test grade Ia	67.700	10
Sergio Froes Ribeiro de Oliva	Emily	Individual freestyle test grade Ia	71.150	7
Elisa Melaranci	Zabelle	Individual championships test grade II	66.952	14
Elisa Melaranci	Zabelle	Individual freestyle test grade Ib	67.100	11
David Pessoa Mesquita	Dauerbrenner	Individual championships test grade Ib	65.261	11
David Pessoa Mesquita	Dauerbrenner	Individual freestyle test grade Ib	66.300	11

Team

Athlete	Horse	Event	Individual score			Total	
Athlete	Horse	Event	TT	CT	Total	Score	Rank
Sergio Froes Ribeiro de Oliva	See above	Team	71.353	67.700	139.053	399.287	13
David Pessoa Mesquita	See above	Team	66.682	65.261	131.943	399.287	13
Marcos Fernandes Alves	See above	Team	65.682	62.609	128.291	399.287	13
Elisa Melaranci	See above	Team	59.905	66.952	126.857	399.287	13

== Football 5-a-side ==
Brazil has qualified for the football 5-a-side tournament.

The following is the Brazil squad in the football 5-a-side tournament of the 2012 Summer Paralympics.

No.	Pos.	Player	Age	Club
1	GK	Fábio Luiz Ribeiro de Vasconcelos	38	APACE
3	DF	Emerson de Carvalho	28	APADV
4	DF	Gledson da Paixão Barros	21	ICB
5	DF	Cássio Lopes dos Reis	23	ICB
6	MF	Marcos Jose Alves Felipe	30	APACE
7	MF	Jeferson da Conceição Gonçalves	22	ICB
8	FW	Raimundo Nonato Alves Mendes	25	ADVP
9	MF	Severino Gabriel da Silva	29	APACE
10	MF	Ricardo Steinmetz Alves	23	AGAFUC
12	GK	Daniel Dantas da Silva	29	APACE

Group play

Pos	Team	Pld	W	D	L	GF	GA	GD	Pts	Qualification or relegation
1	Brazil (BRA)	3	2	1	0	5	0	+5	7	Qualified for the medal round
2	France (FRA)	3	1	2	0	1	0	+1	5	Qualified for the medal round
3	China (CHN)	3	1	1	1	4	1	+3	4	Qualified for the classification round
4	Turkey (TUR)	3	0	0	3	0	9	−9	0	Qualified for the classification round

31 August 2012
9:00

Brazil	0–0	France
	Report

Riverbank Arena
Attendance: 1,202
Referee: Mariano Travaglino (Argentina)

2 September 2012
9:00

Turkey	0–4	Brazil
	Report	Conceição 4', 38'; Alves 14'; Da Silva 24' (pen.)

Riverbank Arena
Attendance: 1,438
Referee: Mariano Travaglino (Argentina)

4 September 2012
9:00

Brazil	1–0	China
Conceição 22'	Report

Riverbank Arena
Attendance: 931
Referee: Germinal Lubrano (Argentina)

Semi-final

6 September 2012
15:45

Brazil	0–0 (a.e.t.)	Argentina
	Report
Penalties
Severino (penalty scored) dos Reis (penalty missed)	1–0	(penalty missed) Sacayan; (penalty missed) Velo; (penalty missed) Padilla

Riverbank Arena
Attendance: 2,016
Referee: François Carcouët (France)

Gold medal match

8 September 2012
16:00

France	0–2	Brazil
	Report	Severino 22' (pen.); Baron 42' (o.g.)

Riverbank Arena
Attendance: 1,990
Referee: Mariano Travaglino (Argentina)

Rank: (gold)

== Football 7-a-side ==
Brazil has qualified for the football 7-a-side tournament.

Group play

Pos	Team	Pld	W	D	L	GF	GA	GD	Pts	Qualification
1	Ukraine (UKR)	3	2	1	0	17	2	+15	7	Qualified for the medal round
2	Brazil (BRA)	3	2	1	0	12	1	+11	7	Qualified for the medal round
3	Great Britain (GBR)	3	1	0	2	5	10	−5	3	Qualified for the classification round
4	United States (USA)	3	0	0	3	0	21	−21	0	Qualified for the classification round

2012-09-01
16:15

Great Britain	0–3	Brazil
	Report	Almeida 10'; Silva 13'; Dos Santos 24'

Riverbank Arena
Attendance: 13,247
Referee: Barry Huizinga (NED)

2012-09-03
9:00

United States	0–8	Brazil
	Report	Almeida 5', 19'; Guimarães 20', 39' da Silva 33', 55'; Tostes 49', 57'

Riverbank Arena
Attendance: 4,529
Referee: David Davies (GBR)

2012-09-05
14:00

Brazil	1–1	Ukraine
Dos Santos Ribeiro 9'	Report	Dotsenko 35'

Riverbank Arena
Attendance: 9,994
Referee: Tom Nield (GBR)

Semi-final

2012-09-07
14:00

Russia	3–1	Brazil
Larionov 23'; Potekhin 34'; Kuligin 48'	Report	Silva de Oliveira 26'

Riverbank Arena
Attendance: 7,383
Referee: Ross Haswell (GBR)

Bronze medal match

2012-09-09
13:30

Brazil	0–5	Iran
	Report	Atashafrouz 17', 23'; Mehri 20', 60+1'; Bakhshi 57'

Riverbank Arena
Attendance: 11,197
Referee: Kevin Wright (GBR)

== Goalball ==
=== Men's tournament ===
The following is the Brazil roster in the men's goalball tournament of the 2012 Summer Paralympics.

No.	Player	Age
1	José Roberto Ferreira de Oliveira	31
3	Alexsander Almeida Maciel Celente	31
4	Leomon Moreno da Silva	19
6	Romário Diego Marques	23
7	Filippe Santos Silvestre	30
9	Leandro Moreno da Silva	24

Group play

Team	Pld	W	D	L	GF	GA	GD	Pts	Qualification
Turkey	5	4	1	0	26	6	+20	13	Quarterfinals
Brazil	5	3	0	2	30	20	+10	9	Quarterfinals
Lithuania	5	2	2	1	33	20	+13	8	Quarterfinals
Finland	5	2	0	3	16	24	−8	6	Quarterfinals
Sweden	5	1	2	2	16	25	−9	5	Eliminated
Great Britain	5	0	1	4	9	35	−26	1	Eliminated

Source: "London 2012 Paralympic Games - Goalball results" (PDF). Paralympic.org. 2012-10-03 – via Goalball.sport.

30 August 2012; 10:15	Finland	5 – 6	Brazil	Copper Box, London; Referees: Launel Scott (CAN), Thomas Baerz (GER)
30 August 2012; 10:15	Alenius 3 Mattila 1 Minala 1	Report	Marques 4 Silvestre 2	Copper Box, London; Referees: Launel Scott (CAN), Thomas Baerz (GER)

31 August 2012; 13:45	Brazil	4 – 5	Sweden	Copper Box, London; Referees: Christl Daentler (GER), Tony Connolly (USA)
31 August 2012; 13:45	Leo. Moreno da Silva 2 Marques 1 Santos Silvestre 1	Report	Hultqvist 4 Gahne 1	Copper Box, London; Referees: Christl Daentler (GER), Tony Connolly (USA)

1 September 2012; 11:30	Brazil	12 – 5	Lithuania	Copper Box, London; Referees: Thomas Baerz (GER), Launel Scott (CAN)
1 September 2012; 11:30	Marques 10; Almeida Maciel Celente 2	Report	Montvydas 2 Pavliuklianec 2 Panovas 1	Copper Box, London; Referees: Thomas Baerz (GER), Launel Scott (CAN)

2 September 2012; 21:00	Turkey	4 – 1	Brazil	Copper Box, London; Referees: Dawna Christy (CAN), Vilma Venckutonyte (LTU)
2 September 2012; 21:00	Karakaya 2 Alkan 2	Report	Marques 1	Copper Box, London; Referees: Dawna Christy (CAN), Vilma Venckutonyte (LTU)

4 September 2012; 18:30	Great Britain	1 – 7	Brazil	Copper Box, London; Referees: Janne Ahokas (FIN), Vilma Venckutonyte (LTU)
4 September 2012; 18:30	Knott 1	Report	Marques 4 Celente 2 Silvestre 1	Copper Box, London; Referees: Janne Ahokas (FIN), Vilma Venckutonyte (LTU)

Quarter-final

5 September 2012; 19:30	Brazil	3 – 0	Belgium	Copper Box, London; Referees: Tony Connolly (USA), Vilma Venckutonyte (LTU)
5 September 2012; 19:30	Marques 2 Almeida Maciel Celente 1	Report		Copper Box, London; Referees: Tony Connolly (USA), Vilma Venckutonyte (LTU)

Semi-final

6 September 2012; 20:00	Brazil	2 – 1	Lithuania	Copper Box, London; Referees: Janne Ahokas (FIN), Shinji Mizuno (JPN)
6 September 2012; 20:00	Almeida Maciel Celente 1 Marques 1	Report	Leonavičius 1	Copper Box, London; Referees: Janne Ahokas (FIN), Shinji Mizuno (JPN)

Gold medal match

7 September 2012; 20:00	Brazil	1 – 8	Finland	Copper Box, London; Referees: Bülent Kimyon (TUR), Tony Connolly (USA)
7 September 2012; 20:00	Leo. Moreno da Silva 1	Report	Posio 4 Mattila 3 Miinala 1	Copper Box, London; Referees: Bülent Kimyon (TUR), Tony Connolly (USA)

Rank: (silver)

=== Women's tournament ===
The following is the Brazil roster in the women's goalball tournament of the 2012 Summer Paralympics.

No.	Player	Age
2	Neusimar Clemente dos Santos	31
3	Ana Carolina Duarte Ruas Custodio	25
4	Denise Daniele Batista de Souza	27
5	Márcia Bonfim Vieira dos Santos	32
7	Gleyse Priscila Portioli de Souza	29
9	Claudia Paula G de Amorim Oliveira	36

Group play

Team	Pld	W	D	L	GF	GA	GD	Pts	Qualification
China	4	4	0	0	28	4	+24	12	Quarterfinals
Great Britain	4	2	1	1	10	9	+1	7	Quarterfinals
Brazil	4	2	0	2	8	15	−7	6	Quarterfinals
Finland	4	1	1	2	10	13	−3	4	Quarterfinals
Denmark	4	0	0	4	3	18	−15	0	Eliminated

Source: "London 2012 Paralympic Games - Goalball results" (PDF). Paralympic.org. 2012-10-03 – via Goalball.sport.

30 August 2012; 19:45	Denmark	0 – 2	Brazil	Copper Box, London; Referees: Hooshang Shariati (IRI), Vilma Venckutonyte (LTU)
30 August 2012; 19:45		Report	Bonfim Vieira dos Santos 2	Copper Box, London; Referees: Hooshang Shariati (IRI), Vilma Venckutonyte (LTU)

31 August 2012; 16:15	Brazil	0 – 8	China	Copper Box, London; Referees: Juha Vuokila (FIN), Dina Murdie (GBR)
31 August 2012; 16:15		Report	Wang S. 5 Chen 1 Lin 1 Ju 1	Copper Box, London; Referees: Juha Vuokila (FIN), Dina Murdie (GBR)

2 September 2012; 09:00	Great Britain	3 – 1	Brazil	Copper Box, London; Referees: Ali Aldarsony (KSA), Morten Hammershoi (DEN)
2 September 2012; 09:00	Sharkey 2 Luke 1	Report	de Souza 1	Copper Box, London; Referees: Ali Aldarsony (KSA), Morten Hammershoi (DEN)

3 September 2012; 15:00	Brazil	5 – 4	Finland	Copper Box, London

Quarter-final

5 September 2012; 10:30	Japan	2 – 0	Brazil	Copper Box, London
5 September 2012; 10:30		Report		Copper Box, London

== Judo ==
Men

Athlete	Event	First round	Quarter-final	Semi-final	Repechage	Bronze medal match	Final	
Athlete	Event	Opposition Result	Opposition Result	Opposition Result	Opposition Result	Opposition Result	Opposition Result	Rank
Roberto Julian Santos	90 kg	Mammadov (AZE); W 0010–0002	Lencina (ARG); L 0000–1000	Did not advance	Crockett (USA); L 0001–0201	did not advance		
Antônio Tenório Silva	100 kg	Srijarung (THA); W 1000–0000	Fedin (RUS); L 0002–0011	Did not advance	Kitazono (JPN); W 0113–0103	Alizadeh (IRI); W 1003–0104	Did not advance	3rd place, bronze medalist(s)
Wilians Silva	+100 kg	Papp (HUN); W 0020–0000	Nadri (IRI); W 0011–0000	Wang (CHN); L 0000–0200	Bye	Zakiyev (AZE); L 0201–0000	Did not advance	5

Women

Athlete	Event	Quarter-final	Semi-final	Repechage	Bronze medal match	Final	
Athlete	Event	Opposition Result	Opposition Result	Opposition Result	Opposition Result	Opposition Result	Rank
Karla Ferreira Cardoso	48 kg	Huang (CHN); W 0011–0000	Lee (TPE); L 001–002	Bye	Potapova (RUS); L 0001–0010	Did not advance	4
Michele Ferreira	52 kg	Stepaniuk (RUS); L 0001–0011	Did not advance				
Lúcia da Silva	57 kg	Bye	Merenciano (ESP); W 1011–0002	—N/a		Sultanova (AZE); L 0000–1000	2nd place, silver medalist(s)
Daniele Bernardes Milan	63 kg	Tolppanen (FIN); W 1000–0000	Zhou (CHN); L 0001–0021	Bye	Soazo (VEN); W 1000–0010	Did not advance	3rd place, bronze medalist(s)
Deanne Silva de Almeida	+70 kg	Davis (USA); W 0122–0010	Yuan (CHN); L 0000–1010	Bye	Kalyanova (RUS); L 0113–0212	Did not advance	4

== Powerlifting ==
Men

Athlete	Event	Result	Rank
Alexsander Whitaker	67.5 kg	165.0	7
Rodrigo Marques	90 kg	192.0	6

Women

Athlete	Event	Result	Rank
Josilene Ferreira	75 kg	NMR	
Márcia Cristina Menezes	82.5 kg	110.0	6

== Rowing ==
Men

Athlete(s)	Event	Heats		Repechage		Final B		Final A	
Athlete(s)	Event	Time	Rank	Time	Rank	Time	Rank	Time	Rank
Luciano Oliveira	Men's single sculls	5:02.21	3 R	4:59.16	2 FA	—N/a		5:05.37	6
Cláudia Santos	Women's single sculls	5:41.38	2 R	5:45.62	2 FA	—N/a		5:47.86	4
Josiane Lima; Isaac Ribeiro	Mixed double sculls	4:13.54	4 R	4:12.11	3 FB	4:10.83	2	did not advance	8
Jairo Klug; Luciano Pires; Norma Balzacchi; Regiane Nunes; Maurício de Abreu	Mixed coxed four	3:30.99	5 R	3:30.28	4 FB	3:36.58	3	did not advance	9

== Sailing ==
Athlete	Event	Race										Total points	Net	Rank
Athlete	Event	1	2	3	4	5	6	7	8	9	10	Total points	Net	Rank
Bruno Landgraf das Neves; Elaine Pedroso da Cunha	SKUD 18 – 2 person keelboat	11	11	10	11	(12); OCS	10	11	11	10	11	108	96	11

== Shooting ==
Athlete	Event	Qualifying		Final	
Athlete	Event	Points	Rank	Points	Rank
Carlos Garletti	Men's 10 m air rifle standing SH1	563	26	did not advance	
Carlos Garletti	Men's 50 m rifle 3 positions SH1	1122	15	did not advance	
Carlos Garletti	Mixed 50 m rifle prone SH1	583	19	did not advance	
Reinaldo Saavedra	Mixed 10 m air rifle prone SH1	—N/a		104.3	7

== Swimming ==
=== Men ===
Athletes	Event	Heat		Final	
Athletes	Event	Time	Rank	Time	Rank
Francisco Avelino	100m freestyle S5	1:35.14	11	did not advance	
Francisco Avelino	50m backstroke S5	44.89	12	did not advance	
Francisco Avelino	100m breaststroke SB4	2:00.11	10	did not advance	
André Brasil	50m freestyle S10	23.50 PR	1 Q	23.16 WR	1st place, gold medalist(s)
André Brasil	100m freestyle S10	53.02	2 Q	51.07 PR	1st place, gold medalist(s)
André Brasil	400m freestyle S10	4:17.15	6 Q	4:11.23	4
André Brasil	100m backstroke S10	1:01.38	3 Q	1:00.11	2nd place, silver medalist(s)
André Brasil	100m butterfly S10	58.72	4 Q	56.35 PR	1st place, gold medalist(s)
André Brasil	200m individual medley SM10	2:16.25	3 Q	2:12.36	2nd place, silver medalist(s)
Ronystony Cordeiro da Silva	50m freestyle S4	44.22	12	did not advance	
Ronystony Cordeiro da Silva	100m freestyle S4	1:48.16	13	did not advance	
Ronystony Cordeiro da Silva	200m freestyle S4	3:55.54	10	did not advance	
Ronystony Cordeiro da Silva	50m backstroke S4	50.95	7 Q	51.75	7
Ronystony Cordeiro da Silva	50m breaststroke SB3	1:00.83	13	did not advance	
Daniel Dias	50m freestyle S5	33.02	1 Q	32.05 WR	1st place, gold medalist(s)
Daniel Dias	100m freestyle S5	1:14.16	1 Q	1:09.35	1st place, gold medalist(s)
Daniel Dias	200m freestyle S5	2:36.51	1 Q	2:27.83 PR	1st place, gold medalist(s)
Daniel Dias	50m backstroke S5	36.29	1 Q	34.99 WR	1st place, gold medalist(s)
Daniel Dias	50m butterfly S5	35.72	2 Q	34.15 WR	1st place, gold medalist(s)
Daniel Dias	100m breaststroke SB4	1:35.82 WR	1 Q	1:32.27 WR	1st place, gold medalist(s)
Carlos Farrenberg	50m freestyle S13	24.71	6 Q	24.62 AM	6
Carlos Farrenberg	100m freestyle S13	54.46 AM	8 Q	54.14 AM	8
Carlos Farrenberg	400m freestyle S13	4:37.22	10	did not advance	
Carlos Farrenberg	200m individual medley SM13	2:28.38	12	did not advance	
Adriano de Lima	50m freestyle S6	33.18	9	did not advance	
Adriano de Lima	100m freestyle S6	1:10.96	5 Q	1:11.32	8
Adriano de Lima	400m freestyle S6	5:30.75	6 Q	5:33.79	7
Adriano de Lima	100m breaststroke SB5	1:43.29	7 Q	1:43.88	7
Adriano de Lima	200m individual medley SM6	3:10.51	12	did not advance	
Carlos Alberto Lopes Maciel	100m breaststroke SB8	1:22.74	20	did not advance	
Phelipe Andrews Melo Rodrigues	50m freestyle S10	24.12	3 Q	23.99	4
Phelipe Andrews Melo Rodrigues	100m freestyle S10	53.21	3 Q	52.42	2nd place, silver medalist(s)
Phelipe Andrews Melo Rodrigues	100m butterfly S10	59.16	6 Q	58.79	5
Caio Oliveira	100m freestyle S8	1:05.86	16	did not advance	
Caio Oliveira	400m freestyle S8	4:41.20 AM	5 Q	4:39.86	7
Caio Oliveira	100m backstroke S8	1:16.72	11	did not advance	
Italo Pereira	400m freestyle S7	5:08.70	9	did not advance	
Italo Pereira	100m backstroke S7	1:16.21	11	did not advance	
Ronaldo Santos	100m freestyle S7	1:12.23	15	did not advance	
Ronaldo Santos	400m freestyle S7	5:19.85	12	did not advance	
Ronaldo Santos	100m backstroke S7	1:22.37	13	did not advance	
Clodoaldo Silva	50m freestyle S5	35.23	5 Q	34.99	5
Clodoaldo Silva	100m freestyle S5	DSQ		did not advance	
Clodoaldo Silva	200m freestyle S5	2:59.58	7 Q	DNS	
Clodoaldo Silva	50m butterfly S5	47.19	13	did not advance	
Matheus Souza	50m freestyle S11	28.04	10	did not advance	
Matheus Souza	100m freestyle S11	1:02.99	9	did not advance	
Matheus Souza	400m freestyle S11	4:57.32	4 Q	4:58.50	6
Ivanildo Vasconcelos	100m backstroke S6	1:37.68	12	did not advance	
Ivanildo Vasconcelos	100m breaststroke SB4	1:53.61	8 Q	1:52.84	7
André Brasil; Daniel Dias; Phelipe Andrews Melo Rodrigues; Caio Oliveira	4 × 100 m freestyle relay	4:00.12	2 Q	3:55.63	4
André Brasil; Adriano de Lima; Carlos Alberto Lopes Maciel; Phelipe Andrews Melo Rodrigues	4 × 100 m medley relay	4:33.04	8 Q	4:28.50	7

=== Women ===
Athletes	Event	Heat		Final	
Athletes	Event	Time	Rank	Time	Rank
Veronica Almeida	50m freestyle S7	38.34	13	did not advance	
Veronica Almeida	100m freestyle S7	DNS		did not advance	
Veronica Almeida	50m butterfly S7	39.93	8 Q	39.63	7
Leticia Freitas	50m freestyle S13	30.16	10	did not advance	
Leticia Freitas	100m freestyle S13	1:06.65	9	did not advance	
Edenia Garcia	50m backstroke S4	54.70	3 Q	53.85	2nd place, silver medalist(s)
Susana Ribeiro	100m freestyle S7	1:22.09	13	did not advance	
Susana Ribeiro	400m freestyle S7	5:58.64	10	did not advance	
Susana Ribeiro	100m backstroke S7	1:39.28	15	did not advance	
Susana Ribeiro	100m breaststroke SB7	1:38.89	4 Q	1:38.71	4
Susana Ribeiro	200m individual medley SM7	3:12.23	4 Q	3:10.42	5
Joana Maria Silva	50m freestyle S5	38.73	3 Q	38.11	4
Joana Maria Silva	100m freestyle S5	1:28.90	7 Q	1:29.28	7
Joana Maria Silva	200m freestyle S5	3:16.27	6 Q	3:17.43	6
Joana Maria Silva	50m butterfly S5	48.37	4 Q	46.62	3rd place, bronze medalist(s)
Raquel Viel	50m freestyle S12	32.79	14	did not advance	
Raquel Viel	100m freestyle S12	DNS		did not advance	
Raquel Viel	400m freestyle S12	5:29.46	9	did not advance	
Raquel Viel	100m backstroke S12	1:21.74	7 Q	1:21.10	7
Raquel Viel	100m breaststroke SB12	1:32.00	11	did not advance	

== Table tennis ==
Men

Athlete	Event	Preliminaries			Quarterfinals	Semifinals	Final / BM	
Athlete	Event	Opposition Result	Opposition Result	Rank	Opposition Result	Opposition Result	Opposition Result	Rank
Iranildo Espindola	Individual C2	Kim MG (KOR); L 0–3	Gao Y (CHN); L 1–3	3	did not advance			
Welder Knaf	Individual C3	Kesler (SRB); L 2-3	Dollmann (AUT); W 3-0	2	did not advance			
Eziquiel Babes	Individual C4	Kober (GER); L 1-3	Guo X (CHN); L 0-3	2	did not advance			
Claudiomiro Segatto	Individual C5	Urhaug (NOR); L 0-3	Savant-Aira (FRA); L 2-3	3	did not advance			
Carlo Michell	Individual C6	Esaulov (RUS); L 0-3	Park HK (KOR); L 0-3	3	did not advance			
Paulo Salmin	Individual C8	Skrzynecki (POL); L 0-3	Ledoux (BEL); L 0-3	3	did not advance			
Carlos Carbinatti	Individual C10	Lian (CHN); L 2-3	Daybell (GBR); L 0-3	3	did not advance			
Lucas Maciel	Individual C11	Pereira-Leal (FRA); L 0-3	Olejarski (POL); L 0-3	3	did not advance			

Women

Athlete	Event	Preliminaries				Quarterfinals	Semifinals	Final / BM	
Athlete	Event	Opposition Result	Opposition Result	Opposition Result	Rank	Opposition Result	Opposition Result	Opposition Result	Rank
Joyce Oliveira	Individual C4	Zhang M (CHN); L 0–3	Matić (SRB); L 1–3	—N/a	3	did not advance			
Maria Passos	Individual C5	Zhang B (CHN); L 0-3	Jung Y-a (KOR); L 0-3	—N/a	3	did not advance			
Jane Rodrigues	Individual C8	Mao J (CHN); L 0-3	Medina (PHI); L 0-3	Dahlen (NOR); L 0-3	4	did not advance			
Bruna Alexandre	Individual C10	Fan L (CHN); L 2-3	Tapper (AUS); L 3-0	Le Morvan (FRA); W 3-1	3	did not advance			
Iliane Faust	Individual C11	Yueng CK (HKG); L 0-3	Siemieniecka (POL); L 0-3	—N/a	3	did not advance			

Teams

Athlete	Event	First Round	Quarterfinals	Semifinals	Final / BM	
Athlete	Event	Opposition Result	Opposition Result	Opposition Result	Opposition Result	Rank
Iranildo Espindola; Ronaldo Souza	Men's team C1-2	—N/a	Slovakia (SVK); L 0–3	did not advance		
Welder Knaf; Claudiomiro Segatto	Men's team C4-5	Germany (GER); L 2-3	did not advance			
Carlos Carbinatti; Paulo Salmin	Men's team C9-10	Malaysia (MAS); L 1-3	did not advance			
Joyce Oliveira; Maria Passos	Women's team C4-5	—N/a	Serbia (SRB); L 0-3	did not advance		
Bruna Alexandre; Jane Rodrigues	Women's team C6-10	Netherlands (NED); W 3-2	Poland (POL); L 1-3	did not advance		

== Volleyball ==
=== Men's tournament ===
Roster

The following is the Brazilian roster in the men's volleyball tournament of the 2012 Summer Paralympics.

№	Name	Date of birth	Position	2012 club
1	Gilberto Lourenco	22 December 1978	OS	(Brazil) IBP
2	Levi Cesar Gomes	7 January 1973	WS	(Brazil) CPSP
4	Carlos Barbosa	5 September 1970	OS	(Brazil) Sesi
5	Daniel Silva	24 March 1981	UN	(Brazil) Unilehu
6	Deivisson Ladeira	7 November 1982	UN	(Brazil) CPSP
7	Rogerio Camargo	29 January 1976	UN	(Brazil) CPSP
8	Giovani de Freitas	26 March 1971	UN	(Brazil) CPSP
9	Wellington Platini	25 March 1985	UN	(Brazil) CPSP
10	Renato Leite	11 August 1982	UN	(Brazil) CPSP
11	Wescley Oliveira	14 November 1983	M	(Brazil) Andef
12	Anderson Ribas	14 February 1979	WS	(Brazil) Unilehu

Group play

Pos	Team	Pld	W	L	Pts	SW	SL	SR	SPW	SPL	SPR
1	Iran	4	4	0	8	12	1	12.000	322	207	1.556
2	Bosnia and Herzegovina	4	3	1	7	10	3	3.333	309	240	1.288
3	Brazil	4	2	2	6	6	6	1.000	257	230	1.117
4	China	4	1	3	5	3	9	0.333	243	266	0.914
5	Rwanda	4	0	4	4	0	12	0.000	115	300	0.383

31 August 2012; 14:00	Brazil	3–0	Rwanda	ExCeL London, London; Referees: Stephen Giugni (AUS), Glynn Archibald (GBR)
31 August 2012; 14:00	(25–5, 25–5, 25–13); Report			ExCeL London, London; Referees: Stephen Giugni (AUS), Glynn Archibald (GBR)

1 September 2012; 21:00	Bosnia and Herzegovina	3–0	Brazil	ExCeL London, London; Referees: Anton Probst (GER), Joe Campbell (USA)
1 September 2012; 21:00	(25–14, 25–21, 25–19); Report			ExCeL London, London; Referees: Anton Probst (GER), Joe Campbell (USA)

3 September 2012; 14:00	Iran	3–0	Brazil	ExCeL London, London; Referees: Amin Al-Traifi (KSA), Mourad El-Baroudy (EGY)
3 September 2012; 14:00	(25–21, 25–15, 25–17); Report			ExCeL London, London; Referees: Amin Al-Traifi (KSA), Mourad El-Baroudy (EGY)

4 September 2012; 11:00	Brazil	3–0	China	ExCeL London, London; Referees: Report
4 September 2012; 11:00	(25–17, 25–23, 25–20); Sari Mannersuo (FIN), Anton Probst (GER)			ExCeL London, London; Referees: Report

Quarter-final

5 September 2012; 11:20	Russia	3–2	Brazil	ExCeL London, London; Referees: Khalid Shanishah (LBA), Jung Mal-Soon (KOR)
5 September 2012; 11:20	(18–25, 25–15, 25–15, 19–25, 15–8); Report			ExCeL London, London; Referees: Khalid Shanishah (LBA), Jung Mal-Soon (KOR)

5th–8th place semi-final

6 September 2012; 19:00	Brazil	3–0	Great Britain	ExCeL London, London; Referees: Amin Al-Traifi (KSA), Dariusz Jasinski (POL)
6 September 2012; 19:00	(25–20, 25–16, 25–15); Report			ExCeL London, London; Referees: Amin Al-Traifi (KSA), Dariusz Jasinski (POL)

5th/6th place match

8 September 2012; 14:00	Egypt	2–3	Brazil	ExCeL London, London; Referees: Masoud Yazdanpanah (IRI), Benno Meijer (NED)
8 September 2012; 14:00	(14–25, 25–15, 21–25, 25–15, 13–15); Report			ExCeL London, London; Referees: Masoud Yazdanpanah (IRI), Benno Meijer (NED)

=== Women's tournament ===
Roster

The following is the Brazilian roster in the women's volleyball tournament of the 2012 Summer Paralympics.

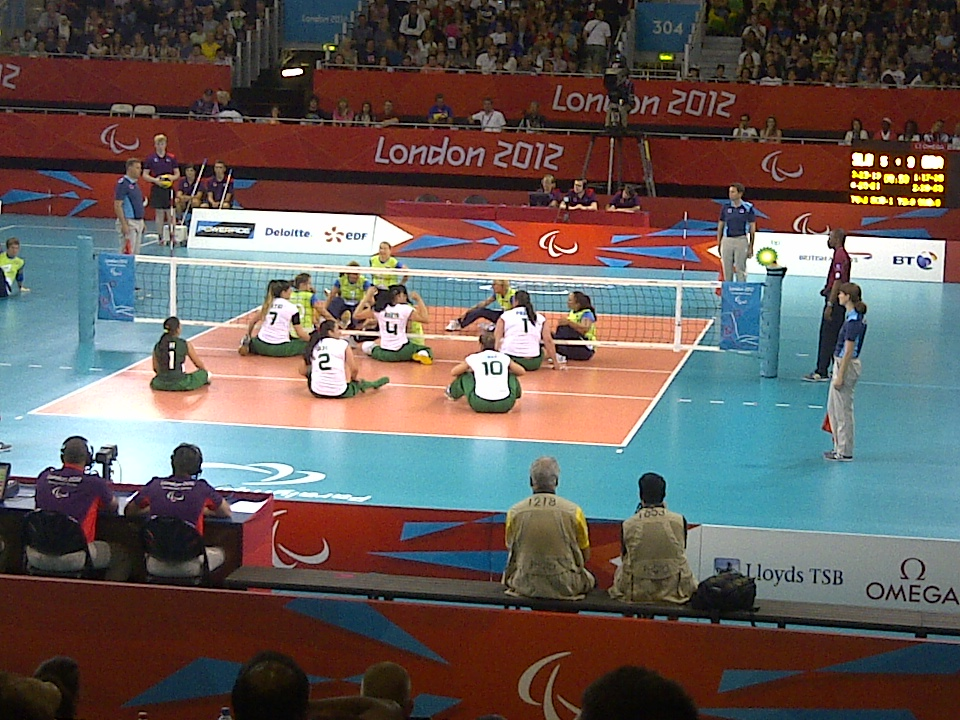
Brazil women's paralympic volleyball team

№	Name	Date of birth	Position	2012 club
1	Paula Herts	21 July 1974		(Brazil) Add
2	Aderlandi Silva	4 July 1976		(Brazil) Sesi
3	Gilvania Lima	28 November 1977		(Brazil) Sesi
4	Adria Silva	1 June 1983		(Brazil) Adap
5	Graciana Alves	16 May 1965		(Brazil) Adap
6	Ana Paula Alves	17 November 1970		(Brazil) Sesi
7	Nathalie Silva	13 April 1990		(Brazil) Sesi
9	Jani Batista	13 August 1986		(Brazil) Adfego
10	Janaina Cunha	16 July 1977		(Brazil) Sesi
11	Gabrielle Marchi	12 March 1991		(Brazil) Adfego
12	Suellen Lima	4 November 1989		(Brazil) Sesi

Group play

Pos	Team	Pld	W	L	Pts	SW	SL	SR	SPW	SPL	SPR
1	China	3	3	0	6	9	2	4.500	275	138	1.993
2	United States	3	2	1	5	7	2	3.500	245	187	1.310
3	Brazil	3	1	2	4	4	8	0.500	242	273	0.886
4	Slovenia	3	0	3	3	2	9	0.222	176	260	0.677

1 September 2012; 9:00	China	3–1	Brazil	ExCeL London, London; Referees: Benno Meijer (NED), Adnan Kolas (BIH)
1 September 2012; 9:00	(26–24, 25–15, 20–25, 25–16); Report			ExCeL London, London; Referees: Benno Meijer (NED), Adnan Kolas (BIH)

2 September 2012; 16:00	Slovenia	2–3	Brazil	ExCeL London, London; Referees: Glynn Archibald (GBR), Toomas Murulo (EST)
2 September 2012; 16:00	(17–25, 28–30, 25–19, 25–21, 7–15); Report			ExCeL London, London; Referees: Glynn Archibald (GBR), Toomas Murulo (EST)

3 September 2012; 19:00	United States	3–0	Brazil	ExCeL London, London; Referees: Jung Mal-Soon (KOR), Khalid Shanishah (LBA)
3 September 2012; 19:00	(25–13, 25–20, 25–19); Report			ExCeL London, London; Referees: Jung Mal-Soon (KOR), Khalid Shanishah (LBA)

5th–8th place semi-final

4 September 2012; 19:00	Brazil	3–0	Great Britain	ExCeL London, London; Referees: Stephen Giugni (AUS), Masoud Yazdanpanah (IRI)
4 September 2012; 19:00	(25–19, 25–10, 25–7); Report			ExCeL London, London; Referees: Stephen Giugni (AUS), Masoud Yazdanpanah (IRI)

5th/6th place match

6 September 2012; 11:00	Brazil	3–1	Slovenia	ExCeL London, London; Referees: Mourad El-Baroudy (EGY), Stephen Giugni (AUS)
6 September 2012; 11:00	(25–16, 25–14, 21–25, 25–21); Report			ExCeL London, London; Referees: Mourad El-Baroudy (EGY), Stephen Giugni (AUS)

== Wheelchair basketball ==
=== Women's tournament ===
Group play

Team	Pld	W	L	PF	PA	PD	Pts	Qualification
Australia	4	3	1	211	180	+31	7 (Note: head-to-head score differential: AUS: +2; NED: +2; CAN: −4) (Note: Netherlands and Australia have the same score difference but Australia won the match from the Netherlands (58–49))	Quarter-finals
Netherlands	4	3	1	236	194	+42	7	Quarter-finals
Canada	4	3	1	248	231	+17	7	Quarter-finals
Great Britain	4	1	3	151	217	−66	5	Quarter-finals
Brazil	4	0	4	190	214	−24	4	Eliminated

Rules for classification: 1) Table points, 2) Head-to-head score differential
Notes:

30 August 2012
18:30

Report

Australia	52–50	Brazil
Scoring by quarter: 14–12, 11–13, 14–12, 13–13
Pts: Crispin 18; Rebs: Merritt 10; Asts: three players 3		Pts: Soares Martins 27; Rebs: Soares Martins 14; Asts: Guimarrães da Costa 12

Basketball Arena, London
Referees: Linas Radykas (LTU)

1 September 2012
13:00

Report

Brazil	37–42	Great Britain
Scoring by quarter: 5–9, 16–10, 10–8, 6–15
Pts: Guimarães da Costa 16; Rebs: De Nazaré Santos 11; Asts: Guimarães da Costa 3		Pts: Conroy 18; Rebs: Freeman 8 Asts: Freeman 11

Basketball Arena, London
Referees: Saskia Warmerdam (NED)

2 September 2012
15:15

Report

Canada	65–61	Brazil
Scoring by quarter: 17–13, 14–10, 16–16, 18–12
Pts: McLachlan 36; Rebs: Ouellet 8 Asts: McLachlan 23		Pts: Soares Martins 26; Rebs: Soares Martins 11; Asts: Guimarães da Costa 7

North Greenwich Arena, London
Referees: Carsten Rehling (GER)

3 September 2012
18:30

Report

Brazil	42–55	Netherlands
Scoring by quarter: 12–19, 12–9, 10–20, 8–7
Pts: Soares Martins 28; Rebs: Soares Martins 14; Asts: Guimarães da Costa 6		Pts: Beijer 27; Rebs: Beijer 12; Asts: Huitzing 7

Basketball Arena, London
Referees: Eisuke Kano (JPN)

9th/10th place match

4 September 2012
10:45

Report

Brazil	59–35	France
Scoring by quarter: 17–10, 14–4, 15–8, 13–13
Pts: Soares Martins 45; Rebs: Guimarães Da Costa 13; Asts: Soares Martins 10		Pts: Belz, Quemener-Pichon 8 Rebs: Saint-Omer-Delépine 10; Asts: Saint-Omer-Delépine 4

North Greenwich Arena, London
Referees: Juan Uruñuela (ESP)

== Wheelchair fencing ==
Athlete	Event	Group Stage			Round of 16	Quarterfinals	Semifinals	Final	
Athlete	Event	Opposition	Result	Rank	Opposition Result	Opposition Result	Opposition Result	Opposition Result	Rank
Jovane Silva Guissone	Men's épée B	Bezyazychny (BLR)	L 0-5	3 Q	Mainville (CAN); W 15-6	Cratere (FRA); W 15-11	Latreche (FRA); W 15-11	Tam CS (HKG); W 15-14	1st place, gold medalist(s)
Jovane Silva Guissone	Men's épée B	Mainville (CAN)	L 2-5	3 Q	Mainville (CAN); W 15-6	Cratere (FRA); W 15-11	Latreche (FRA); W 15-11	Tam CS (HKG); W 15-14	1st place, gold medalist(s)
Jovane Silva Guissone	Men's épée B	Pluta (POL)	W 5-2	3 Q	Mainville (CAN); W 15-6	Cratere (FRA); W 15-11	Latreche (FRA); W 15-11	Tam CS (HKG); W 15-14	1st place, gold medalist(s)
Jovane Silva Guissone	Men's épée B	Kurzin (RUS)	W 5-3	3 Q	Mainville (CAN); W 15-6	Cratere (FRA); W 15-11	Latreche (FRA); W 15-11	Tam CS (HKG); W 15-14	1st place, gold medalist(s)
Jovane Silva Guissone	Men's foil B	Datsko (UKR)	W 5-1	2 Q	Bye	Datsko (UKR); L 5-15	did not advance		
Jovane Silva Guissone	Men's foil B	Chung TC (HKG)	L 3-5	2 Q	Bye	Datsko (UKR); L 5-15	did not advance		
Jovane Silva Guissone	Men's foil B	Cima (ITA)	W 5-4	2 Q	Bye	Datsko (UKR); L 5-15	did not advance		
Jovane Silva Guissone	Men's foil B	Wyganowski (POL)	W 5-3	2 Q	Bye	Datsko (UKR); L 5-15	did not advance		

== Wheelchair tennis ==
Men

Athlete	Event	Round of 64	Round of 32	Round of 16	Quarter-final	Semi-final	Bronze medal match	Final	
Athlete	Event	Opposition Result	Opposition Result	Opposition Result	Opposition Result	Opposition Result	Opposition Result	Opposition Result	Rank
Rafael Medeiros	Singles	Kunieda (JPN); L 0–6, 0–6	Did not advance						
Carlos Santos	Singles	Gérard (BEL); L 3–6, 2–6	Did not advance						
Daniel Alves Rodrigues	Singles	Oquendo Barrios (COL); W 7–6, 5–7, 6–4	Reid (GBR); L 0–6, 0–6	Did not advance					
Maurício Pommê	Singles	Batycki (POL); W 6–4, 6–2	Houdet (FRA); L 2–6, 1–6	Did not advance					
Rafael Medeiros; Daniel Rodrigues	Doubles	—N/a	Lee / Oh (KOR); L 4–6, 6–7	did not advance					
Maurício Pommê; Carlos Santos	Doubles	—N/a	Rydberg / Welch (USA); W 1–6, 6–3, 7–3	Ammerlaan / Vink (NED); L 3–6, 0–6	did not advance				

Women

Athlete	Event	Round of 32	Round of 16	Quarter-final	Semi-final	Bronze medal match	Final	
Athlete	Event	Opposition Result	Opposition Result	Opposition Result	Opposition Result	Opposition Result	Opposition Result	Rank
Natália Mayara	Singles	Griffioen (NED); L 2–6, 0–6	Did not advance					
