= Brazil at the 1976 Summer Paralympics =

- IPC code: BRA
- NPC: Brazilian Paralympic Committee
- Website: www.cpb.org.br

in Toronto
- Medals Ranked 32nd: Gold 0 Silver 1 Bronze 0 Total 1

Summer Paralympics appearances (overview)
- 1972; 1976; 1980; 1984; 1988; 1992; 1996; 2000; 2004; 2008; 2012; 2016; 2020; 2024

Brazil sent a delegation to compete at the 1976 Summer Paralympics in Toronto, Ontario, Canada. Its athletes finished thirty-second in the overall medal count.

== Medalists ==
Medal	Name	Sport	Event
Silver	Luiz Carlos da Costa; Robson Sampaio	Lawn bowls	Men's pairs wh

== See also ==
- 1976 Summer Paralympics
- Brazil at the 1976 Summer Olympics
