= Brazil at the 1980 Summer Paralympics =

- IPC code: BRA
- NPC: Brazilian Paralympic Committee
- Website: www.cpb.org.br

in Arnhem
- Competitors: 2
- Medals: Gold 0 Silver 0 Bronze 0 Total 0

Summer Paralympics appearances (overview)
- 1972; 1976; 1980; 1984; 1988; 1992; 1996; 2000; 2004; 2008; 2012; 2016; 2020; 2024

Brazil competed at the 1980 Summer Paralympics in Arnhem, Netherlands. 2 competitors from Brazil won no medals and so did not place in the medal table.

== See also ==
- Brazil at the Paralympics
- Brazil at the 1980 Summer Olympics
