= Brazil at the 2014 Winter Paralympics =

- IPC code: BRA
- NPC: Brazilian Paralympic Committee
- Website: www.cpb.org.br

in Sochi
- Competitors: 2 in 2 sports
- Medals: Gold 0 Silver 0 Bronze 0 Total 0

Winter Paralympics appearances (overview)
- 2014; 2018; 2022; 2026

Brazil sent a delegation to compete at the 2014 Winter Paralympics in Sochi, Russia, held between 7–16 March 2014. This marked the country's first entry into the Winter Paralympic Games. Brazil sent two athletes, snowboarder Andre Pereira in Alpine skiing and Fernando Rocha in cross-country skiing. The country's best performance in any event was 15th, achieved by Rocha in the 15 km sitting competition.

== Background ==
Brazil has competed in every Summer Paralympics since making their debut at the 1972 Summer Paralympics in Heidelberg, Germany. The nation made its first appearance in a Winter Olympic Games in the 1992 Albertville Games, and has participated in every Winter Olympics since, as of the conclusion of the 2018 Winter Olympics. However, the 2014 Winter Paralympics was the nation's first appearance in the winter version of the Paralympics. Andre Pereira was chosen as the Brazilian flag-bearer for the parade of nations during the opening ceremony. Fernando Rocha was chosen as the flag-bearer for the closing ceremony.

== Disability classification ==
Every participant at the Paralympics has their disability grouped into one of five disability categories; amputation, the condition may be congenital or sustained through injury or illness; cerebral palsy; wheelchair athletes, there is often overlap between this and other categories; visual impairment, including blindness; Les autres, any physical disability that does not fall strictly under one of the other categories, for example dwarfism or multiple sclerosis. Each Paralympic sport then has its own classifications, dependent upon the specific physical demands of competition. Events are given a code, made of numbers and letters, describing the type of event and classification of the athletes competing. Events with "B" in the code are for athletes with visual impairment, codes LW1 to LW9 are for athletes who stand to compete and LW10 to LW12 are for athletes who compete sitting down. Alpine skiing and cross-country skiing events grouped athletes into separate competitions for sitting, standing and visually impaired athletes.

== Alpine skiing ==
For the 2014 Winter Paralympics, snowboard cross was considered a discipline of Alpine skiing, rather than a separate sport. Snowboarding was offered only for athletes who competed in a standing position. The men's snowboard cross event was held on 14 March 2014. Andre Pereira was 34 years old at the time of the competition. Over three runs, Pereira improved his time on each run. Only the two best runs for each rider counted, and his combined time was 2 minutes and 42 seconds, placing him 28th out of 33 competitors. The race was won by Evan Strong with a combined time of 1 minute and 43 seconds.

=== Men ===
Athlete	Event	Race 1		Race 2		Race 3		Total	
Athlete	Event	Time	Rank	Time	Rank	Time	Rank	Time	Rank
André Pereira	Snowboard cross	1:37.17	30	1:23.09	27	1:18.98	26	2:42.07	28

== Cross-country skiing ==
Fernando Rocha was 35 at the time of the Games. He competes in cross-country skiing from a sitting position. He was classified as LW11.5, and as such, his final times were only 97% of his real times. Athletes classified as LW12 had their full times counted, whereas athletes classified LW11 had 94% of their times count. Athletes classified LW10 had only 86% of their times count.

On 9 March 2014, he competed in the 15 km sitting competition, and finished with an adjusted time of 49 minutes and 31 seconds, placing him 15th out of 21 competitors, and over 8 minutes behind the winning time of 40 minutes and 51 seconds. Three days later, on 12 March, he participated in the qualification round of the 1km sprint sitting. He finished with an adjusted time of 2 minutes, 29 seconds, good for 20th place, however, only the top 12 were allowed to advance to the semi-finals. The slowest qualifying adjusted time was 2 minutes and 20.12 seconds. His final event was on 16 March, the 10 km sitting competition. He finished with an adjusted time of 35 minutes and 37 seconds; good for 21st place out of 26 competitors who finished the race—two competitors did not finish. The winning time for this event was an adjusted 30 minutes and 52 seconds.

=== Men's sprint ===
Athlete	Event	Qualification			Semifinal			Final		
Athlete	Event	Real Time	Result	Rank	Real Time	Result	Rank	Real Time	Result	Rank
Fernando Rocha	1km sprint sitting	2:33.78	2:29.17	20	did not advance					

=== Men's distance ===
Athlete	Event	Final		
Athlete	Event	Real Time	Result	Rank
Fernando Rocha	15 km sitting	51:03.3	49:31.4	15
Fernando Rocha	10 km sitting	36:44.0	35:37.9	21

== See also ==
- Brazil at the Paralympics
- Brazil at the 2014 Winter Olympics
