= Peterson Rosa =

Brazilian Paralympic footballer

Personal information
- Nationality: Brazilian
- Years active: 2000-present
Medal record
Men's 7-a-side football
Representing Brazil
Paralympic Games
Silver medal – second place	2004 Athens	Team
Bronze medal – third place	2000 Sydney	Team

Peterson Rosa is a Brazilian Paralympic footballer.

== Biography ==
Rosa is a Paralympic footballer who won Bronze medal for being a participant at 2000 Summer Paralympics in Sydney, Australia and was awarded Silver medal for 2004 Summer Paralympics in Athens, Greece.
