= Swimming at the 2012 Summer Paralympics – Men's 200 metre freestyle S5 =

Event at the 2012 Summer Paralympics

Men's 200 metre freestyle S5 at the XIV Paralympic Games
- Venue: London Aquatics Centre
- Dates: 1 September 2012
- Competitors: 11 from 10 nations

Medalists
1st place, gold medalist(s)		Daniel Dias	Brazil
2nd place, silver medalist(s)		Sebastián Rodríguez	Spain
3rd place, bronze medalist(s)		Roy Perkins	United States

The men's 200 metre freestyle S5 event at the 2012 Paralympic Games took place on 1 September, at the London Aquatics Centre.

Two heats were held, one with five swimmers and one with six swimmers. The swimmers with the eight fastest times advanced to the final.

== Heats ==
=== Heat 1 ===
Rank	Lane	Name	Nationality	Time	Notes
1	4	Roy Perkins	United States	2:46.94	Q
2	5	Anthony Stephens	Great Britain	2:51.42	Q
3	3	Cameron Leslie	New Zealand	2:56.74	Q
4	6	Matija Grebenic	Croatia	3:06.43	Q
5	2	Jonas Larsen	Denmark	3:15.56	

=== Heat 2 ===
Rank	Lane	Name	Nationality	Time	Notes
1	4	Daniel Dias	Brazil	2:36.51	Q
2	5	Sebastián Rodríguez	Spain	2:45.96	Q
3	3	James Scully	Ireland	2:57.36	Q
4	6	Clodoaldo Silva	Brazil	2:59.58	Q
5	2	Jamery Siga	Malaysia	3:18.52	
6	7	Konstantinos Karaouzas	Greece	3:37.33	

== Final ==
Rank	Lane	Name	Nationality	Time	Notes
1st place, gold medalist(s)	4	Daniel Dias	Brazil	2:27.83	PR
2nd place, silver medalist(s)	5	Sebastián Rodríguez	Spain	2:43.11	
3rd place, bronze medalist(s)	3	Roy Perkins	United States	2:43.14	
4	6	Anthony Stephens	Great Britain	2:49.83	
5	7	James Scully	Ireland	2:53.03	
6	2	Cameron Leslie	New Zealand	2:54.27	OC
7	8	Matija Grebenic	Croatia	3:05.15	
	1	Jonas Larsen	Denmark	DNS	
