= Football 7-a-side at the 2004 Summer Paralympics =

Football 7-a-side - Men at the XII Paralympic Games
- Paralympic Football 7-a-side
- Venue: Olympic Hockey Centre (Athens)
- Dates: 19–27 September 2004
- Competitors: 8

Medalists
1st place, gold medalist(s)		Yevhen Zhuchynin; Ihor Kosenko; Volodymyr Antonyuk; Volodymyr Kabanov; Serhiy Vakulenko; Andriy Roztoka; Andriy Tsukanov; Anatoliy Shevchyk; Denys Ponomaryov; Taras Dutko; Sergiy Babiy; Vitaliy Trushev	Ukraine
2nd place, silver medalist(s)		Flávio Pereira; Luciano Rocha; Marcos Silva; Joseph Guimarães; Moises Silva; Fabiano Bruzzi; Adriano Costa; Renato Lima; Peterson Rosa; Leandro Marinho; Jean Rodrigues; Marcos Ferreira	Brazil
3rd place, bronze medalist(s)		Marat Fatiakhdinov; Alexander Frolov; Lasha Murvanidze; Pavel Borisov; Andrey Kuvaev; Evgeny Chubko; Ivan Potekhin; Alexei Tchesmine; Aleksandr Glushonok; Anton Kalachev; Andrey Lozhechnikov; Oleg Smirnov	Russia

7-a-side Football at the 2004 Summer Paralympics took place at the Olympic Hockey Centre in Athens. The sport was open to contestants with cerebral palsy. Matches were 30 minutes each way.

The tournament was won by the team representing Ukraine.

== Results ==
=== Preliminaries ===
Qualified for final round

Rank	Competitor	MP	W	D	L	Goals	Points	UKR	ARG	IRI	IRL
1	Ukraine	3	2	1	0	14:4	7	x	2:2	6:2	6:0
2	Argentina	3	1	2	0	9:6	5	2:2	x	2:2	5:2
3	Iran	3	1	1	1	11:10	4	2:6	2:2	x	7:2
4	Ireland	3	0	0	3	4:18	0	0:6	2:5	2:7	x

==== Group B ====
Rank	Competitor	MP	W	D	L	Goals	Points	BRA	RUS	NED	USA
1	Brazil	3	3	0	0	12:2	9	x	2:1	6:1	4:0
2	Russia	3	2	0	1	11:3	6	1:2	x	7:1	3:0
3	Netherlands	3	1	0	2	8:14	3	1:6	1:7	x	6:1
4	United States	3	0	0	3	1:13	0	0:4	0:3	1:6	x

=== Competition bracket ===
Semi-finals
Ukraine	4
Russia	1
Brazil	4
Argentina	1

Final
Ukraine	4
Brazil	1
Third place
Russia	5
Argentina	0

=== Classification 5-8 ===
==== Classification 5/6 ====
Iran	3 – 0	Netherlands

==== Classification 7/8 ====
Ireland	4 – 0	United States

== Team Lists ==
Ukraine; Yevhen Zhuchynin; Ihor Kosenko; Volodymyr Antonyuk; Volodymyr Kabanov; Serhiy Vakulenko; Andriy Roztoka; Andriy Tsukanov; Anatoliy Shevchyk; Denys Ponomaryov; Taras Dutko; Sergiy Babiy; Vitaliy Trushev	Argentina; Claudio Bastias; Claudio Conte; Mario Sosa; Javier Sosa; Matias Nunez; Ezequiel Jaime; Diego Canals; Gustavo Nahuelquin; Emiliano Lopez; Claudio Morinigo; Damian Pereyra; Carlos Cardinal	Iran; Hadi Safari; Mohammadreza Khedri; Abdolreza Kerimizadeh; Morteza Heidari Gouradel; Seyed Nasser Hosseini Far; Houshang Khosravani; Javad Mansour Falah; Naghi Kamani; G. Najafitovahkhoshgeh; Ardeshir Mahini; M. Mshhady Hashemi	Ireland; Darren Kavanagh; Alan O'Hara; Brendan O'Grady; Kieran Devlin; Andrew Clint; Finbarr O'Riordan; Gary Messett; James Murrihy; Aidan Brennan; Joseph Markey; Paul Dollard; Peter O'Neill
Brazil; Flávio Pereira; Luciano Rocha; Marcos Silva; Joseph Guimarães; Moisés Silva; Fabiano Bruzzi; Adriano Costa; Renato Lima; Peterson Rosa; Leandro Marinho; Jean Rodrigues; Marcos Ferreira	Russia; Marat Fatiakhdinov; Alexander Frolov; Lasha Murvanidze; Pavel Borisov; Andrey Kuvaev; Evgeny Chubko; Ivan Potekhin; Alexei Tchesmine; Aleksandr Glushonok; Anton Kalachev; Andrey Lozhechnikov; Oleg Smirnov	Netherlands; Ruben de Haas; David Tetelepta; Stephan Lokhoff; Martijn van de Ven; Bart Adelaars; Nico Berlee; Patrick Beekmans; Rudi van Breemen; Jeroen Voogd; Richard van den Born; Thieu van Son; Milo de Wit	United States; Michael Peters; Joshua McKinney; Chris Wolf; Jon McCullough; Eli Wolff; Jason Slemons; Tom Latsch; Derek Arneaud; Josh Blue; David Woosnam; John Theobald; Keith Johnson
