= Swimming at the 2012 Summer Paralympics – Men's 100 metre freestyle S5 =

Event at the 2012 Summer Paralympics

Men's 100m Freestyle S5 at the XIV Paralympic Games
- Venue: London Aquatics Centre
- Dates: 8 September 2012
- Competitors: 13 from 11 nations
- Winning time: 1:09.35

Medalists
1st place, gold medalist(s)		Daniel Dias	Brazil
2nd place, silver medalist(s)		Roy Perkins	United States
3rd place, bronze medalist(s)		Sebastián Rodríguez	Spain

The men's 100m freestyle S5 event at the 2012 Summer Paralympics took place at the London Aquatics Centre on 8 September. There were two heats; the swimmers with the eight fastest times advanced to the final.

== Results ==
=== Heats ===
Competed from 10:24.

==== Heat 1 ====
Rank	Lane	Name	Nationality	Time	Notes
1	4	Sebastián Rodríguez	Spain	1:17.37	Q
2	5	Anthony Stephens	Great Britain	1:19.05	Q
3	3	Dmytro Kryzhanovskyy	Ukraine	1:21.61	Q
4	6	Takayuki Suzuki	Japan	1:25.64	Q
5	2	Matija Grebenic	Croatia	1:30.23	
6	7	Francisco Avelino	Brazil	1:35.14	

==== Heat 2 ====
Rank	Lane	Name	Nationality	Time	Notes
1	4	Daniel Dias	Brazil	1:14.16	Q
2	5	Roy Perkins	United States	1:16.78	Q
3	6	Thanh Tung Vo	Vietnam	1:21.94	Q, AS
4	2	James Scully	Ireland	1:22.50	Q
5	7	Jonas Larsen	Denmark	1:28.49	
6	1	Beytullah Eroglu	Turkey	1:38.45	
	3	Clodoaldo Silva	Brazil	DSQ	

=== Final ===
Competed at 18:27.

Rank	Lane	Name	Nationality	Time	Notes
1st place, gold medalist(s)	4	Daniel Dias	Brazil	1:09.35	
2nd place, silver medalist(s)	5	Roy Perkins	United States	1:14.78	
3rd place, bronze medalist(s)	3	Sebastián Rodríguez	Spain	1:15.70	
4	2	Dmytro Kryzhanovskyy	Ukraine	1:16.88	
5	6	Anthony Stephens	Great Britain	1:17.23	
6	7	Thanh Tung Vo	Vietnam	1:19.83	AS
7	1	James Scully	Ireland	1:21.89	
8	8	Takayuki Suzuki	Japan	1:24.73	

'Q = qualified for final. AS = Asian Record. DSQ = Disqualified.
