= Swimming at the 2012 Summer Paralympics – Men's 50 metre freestyle S5 =

Event at the 2012 Summer Paralympics

Men's 50 metre freestyle S5 at the XIV Paralympic Games
- Venue: London Aquatics Centre
- Dates: 30 August 2012
- Competitors: 16 from 12 nations

Medalists
1st place, gold medalist(s)		Daniel Dias	Brazil
2nd place, silver medalist(s)		Sebastián Rodríguez	Spain
3rd place, bronze medalist(s)		Roy Perkins	United States

The men's 50 metre freestyle S5 event at the 2012 Paralympic Games took place on 30 August, at the London Aquatics Centre.

Two heats were held, each with eight swimmers. The swimmers with the eight fastest times advanced to the final.

== Heats ==
=== Heat 1 ===
Rank	Lane	Name	Nationality	Time	Notes
1	4	Sebastián Rodríguez	Spain	33.80	Q
2	5	Dmytro Kryzhanovskyy	Ukraine	34.85	Q
3	3	Thanh Tung Vo	Vietnam	35.43	Q
4	2	James Scully	Ireland	38.18	
5	6	Jamery Siga	Malaysia	39.08	
6	1	Zsolt Vereczkei	Hungary	39.46	
7	8	Jonas Larsen	Denmark	40.48	
8	7	Zul Amirul Sidi Bin Abdullah	Malaysia	43.30	

=== Heat 2 ===
Rank	Lane	Name	Nationality	Time	Notes
1	4	Daniel Dias	Brazil	33.02	Q
2	5	Roy Perkins	United States	34.16	Q
3	6	Clodoaldo Silva	Brazil	35.23	Q
4	3	Anthony Stephens	Great Britain	35.59	Q
5	7	Andrew Mullen	Great Britain	37.40	Q
6	2	Takayuki Suzuki	Japan	38.88	
7	8	Efrem Morelli	Italy	42.00	
8	1	Francisco Avelino	Brazil	43.03	

== Final ==
Rank	Lane	Name	Nationality	Time	Notes
1st place, gold medalist(s)	4	Daniel Dias	Brazil	32.05	WR
2nd place, silver medalist(s)	5	Sebastián Rodríguez	Spain	33.44	
3rd place, bronze medalist(s)	3	Roy Perkins	United States	33.69	
4	6	Dmytro Kryzhanovskyy	Ukraine	34.97	
5	2	Clodaldo Silva	Brazil	34.99	
6	1	Anthony Stephens	Great Britain	35.74	
7	7	Thanh Tung Vo	Vietnam	36.05	
8	8	Andrew Mullen	Great Britain	38.08	
