= Abdelghani Gtaib =

Moroccan Paralympic athlete

Medal record

Paralympic athletics

Representing Morocco

Paralympic Games
Silver medal – second place	2004 Athens	1500 metres - T46

Abdelghani Gtaib is a paralympic athlete from Morocco competing mainly in category T46 middle and long-distance events.

Abdelghani competed in the 2004 Summer Paralympics winning a silver in the 1500m and also competing in the 800m and 5000m.
