= Fabiano Bruzzi =

Brazilian Paralympic footballer

Personal information
- Nationality: Brazilian
Medal record
Men's 7-a-side football
Representing Brazil
Paralympic Games
Silver medal – second place	2004 Athens	Team

Fabiano Bruzzi is a Brazilian Paralympic footballer who won a Silver medal for his participation in 2004 Summer Paralympics in Athens, Greece.
