= Leandro Marinho =

Brazilian Paralympic footballer

Personal information
- Nationality: Brazilian
Medal record
Men's 7-a-side football
Representing Brazil
Paralympic Games
Silver medal – second place	2004 Athens	Team

Leandro Marinho is a Brazilian Paralympic footballer.

== Biography ==
Leandro is a Paralympic footballer who a silver medal at the 2004 Summer Paralympics in Athens, Greece. He also participated in the 2008 Summer Paralympics in Beijing, China on 10 September 2008.
