= Joseph Guimarães =

Brazilian Paralympic footballer

Personal information
- Nationality: Brazilian
Medal record
Men's 7-a-side football
Representing Brazil
Paralympic Games
| Silver medal – second place | 2004 Athens | Team |

Joseph Guimarães is a Brazilian Paralympic footballer that won a silver medal at the 2004 Summer Paralympics in Athens, Greece.
