= Football 7-a-side at the 2000 Summer Paralympics =

Football 7-a-side at the XI Paralympic Games
- Venue: State Hockey Centre
- Competitors: 8 teams from 8 nations

Medalists
1st place, gold medalist(s)		Russia	Russia
2nd place, silver medalist(s)		Ukraine	Ukraine
3rd place, bronze medalist(s)		Brazil	Brazil

Paralympic symbol (1994-2004)

Football 7-a-side at the 2000 Summer Paralympics consisted of a men's event with eight teams competing.

== Medal summary ==
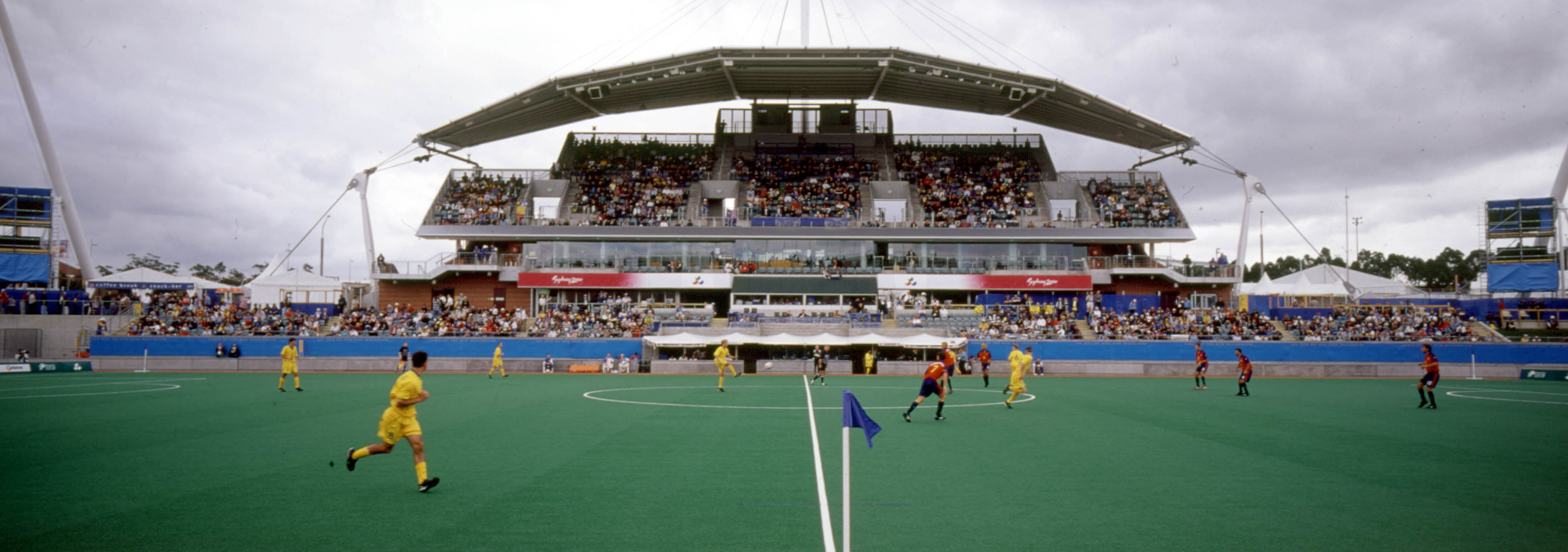
Panoramic view of the venue for football 7-a-side during the 2000 Summer Paralympics. A match can be seen played on field in front of the stadium.

Event	Gold	Silver	Bronze
Men's team	Russia (RUS) Alexey Shemanin; Marat Fatiakhdinov; Alexei Silatchev; Mamuka Dzimistarishvili; Victor Morozov; Alexei Toumakov; Pavel Sizov; Mikhail Brednev; Nikolan Korenkov; Andrey Lozhechnikov; Sergey Khryashev	Ukraine (UKR) Yevhen Zhuchynin; Mykola Kovalskyy; Volodymyr Kabanov; Serhiy Vakulenko; Andriy Roztoka; Andriy Tsukanov; Valeriy Novopoltsev; Ihor Lytvynenko; Taras Dutko; Sergiy Krot; Sergiy Babiy	Brazil (BRA) Adriano Costa; Luciano Rocha; Marcos Silva; Fábio Ferreira; Jean Rodrigues; Romildo Quiaveli; Douglas Amador; João Ayres; Márcio Lopes; Moisés Tamiozzo; Marcos dos Santos

== Group stage ==
Group A
Team	Wins	Draws	Losses	Goals	Points	vs. UKR	vs. POR	vs. ARG	vs. NED
Ukraine (UKR)	3	0	0	12:2	9	-	3:0	6:2	3:0
Portugal (POR)	1	1	1	2:3	4	0:3	-	2:0	0:0
Argentina (ARG)	1	0	2	5:10	3	2:6	0:2	-	3:2
Netherlands (NED)	0	1	2	2:6	1	0:3	0:0	2:3	-

Group B
Team	Wins	Draws	Losses	Goals	Points	vs. RUS	vs. BRA	vs. ESP	vs. AUS
Russia (RUS)	2	1	0	8:2	7	-	2:2	3:0	3:0
Brazil (BRA)	1	2	0	7:3	5	2:2	-	1:1	4:0
Spain (ESP)	1	1	1	2:4	4	0:3	1:1	-	1:0
Australia (AUS)	0	0	3	0:8	0	0:3	0:4	0:1	-

== Finals ==
Semi-finals
Ukraine (UKR)	2
Brazil (BRA)	1
Portugal (POR)	1
Russia (RUS)	3

Final
Ukraine (UKR)	2
Russia (RUS)	3
Third place
Brazil (BRA)	2
Portugal (POR)	1
