= Renato Lima =

Brazilian Paralympic footballer

Personal information
- Nationality: Brazilian
Medal record
Men's 7-a-side football
Representing Brazil
Paralympic Games
Silver medal – second place	2004 Athens	Team

Renato Lima is a Brazilian Paralympic footballer.

== Biography ==
Lima is a Paralympic footballer who won Silver medal for his participation in 2004 Summer Paralympics in Athens, Greece. He also scored three goals at Copa América for 2011 CPISRA World championship in Buenos Aires, Argentina.
