= Eduardo Amaral =

Brazilian Paralympic judoka (born 1967)

Personal information
- Full name: Eduardo Paes Barreto Amaral
- Born: 29 June 1967 (age 58) Rio de Janeiro, Brazil

Sport
- Country: Brazil
- Sport: Para judo
Medal record
Para judo
Representing Brazil
Paralympic Games
Silver medal – second place	2004 Athens	Men's -73kg
Parapan American Games
Bronze medal – third place	2007 Rio de Janeiro	Men's -73kg

Eduardo Paes Barreto Amaral (born 29 June 1967) is a retired Brazilian Para judoka who competed at international level events. He is a Paralympic silver medalist and a Parapan American Games bronze medalist.
