= Football at the Summer Paralympics =

Football at the Summer Paralympics may refer to:

- Football 5-a-side at the Summer Paralympics
- Football 7-a-side at the Summer Paralympics
