= Jean Rodrigues =

Brazilian Paralympic footballer

Personal information
- Nationality: Brazilian
- Born: 19 September 1981 (age 44)
Medal record
Men's 7-a-side football
Representing Brazil
Paralympic Games
Silver medal – second place	2004 Athens	Team
Bronze medal – third place	2000 Sydney	Team

Jean Rodrigues (born 19 September 1981) is a Brazilian Paralympic footballer who won a silver medal at the 2004 Summer Paralympics in Athens, Greece.
