= Douglas Amador =

Brazilian Paralympic athlete

Personal information
- Born: 28 May 1965 (age 61) Niterói, Brazil

Sport
- Disability class: T37
Medal record
Representing Brazil
Paralympic Games
Track and field (athletics)
Silver medal – second place	1996 Atlanta	200 metres T37
Bronze medal – third place	1996 Atlanta	Long Jump F34-37
Bronze medal – third place	1996 Atlanta	100 metres T37
Football
Bronze medal – third place	2000 Sydney	7-a-side football

Douglas Vieira Amador (born 28 May 1965) is a paralympic athlete from Brazil competing mainly in category T37 sprint and F37 long jump events.

Douglas competed at the 1996 Summer Paralympics in Sydney and won silver in the 200m, bronze in the 100m and bronze in the long jump. Four years later in 2000 he competed as part of the bronze medal-winning Brazilian seven-a-side football team.
