= Adriano Costa (footballer) =

Brazilian Paralympic athlete

Personal information
- Nationality: Brazilian
- Born: 8 August 1975 (age 50)
Medal record
Men's 7-a-side football
Representing Brazil
Paralympic Games
Silver medal – second place	2004 Athens	Team
Bronze medal – third place	2000 Sydney	Team

Adriano Costa (born 8 August 1975) is a Brazilian Paralympic footballer who won bronze medal for being a participant at the 2000 Summer Paralympics in Sydney, Australia and was awarded silver medal for the 2004 Summer Paralympics in Athens, Greece.
