= Marcos Silva =

Brazilian Paralympic footballer

Personal information
- Nationality: Brazilian
- Born: 13 July 1980 (age 45)
Medal record
Men's 7-a-side football
Representing Brazil
Paralympic Games
Silver medal – second place	2004 Athens	Team
Bronze medal – third place	2000 Sydney	Team

Marcos Silva (born 13 July 1980) is a Brazilian Paralympic footballer.

== Biography ==
Silva is a Paralympic footballer who won Bronze medal for being a participant at the 2000 Summer Paralympics in Sydney, Australia and was awarded silver medal for 2004 Summer Paralympics in Athens, Greece. In 2008 Summer Paralympics he scored a goal for his team in Beijing, China where his country played against the Netherlands on September 8, 2008. He also participated at BT Paralympic World Cup Wheelchair Basketball event at the Manchester Regional Arena on May 24, 2011, in Manchester, England.
