= Ozivam Bonfim =

Brazilian Paralympic athlete

Personal information
- Full name: Ozivam dos Santos Bonfim
- Born: 12 April 1975 (age 51)

Sport
- Disability class: T46
Medal record
Men's para athletics
Representing Brazil
Paralympic Games
Bronze medal – third place	2004 Athens	5000m - T46
Parapan American Games
Bronze medal – third place	2007 Rio de Janeiro	5000m - T46

Ozivam dos Santos Bonfim (born 12 April 1975) is a Paralympic athlete from Brazil competing mainly in category T46 distance running events.

In the 2004 Summer Paralympics Ozivam competed in the 1500m and won a bronze medal in the T46 5000m.
