= Luciano Rocha =

Brazilian Paralympic footballer

Personal information
- Nationality: Brazilian
- Born: 15 June 1979 (age 47)
Medal record
Men's 7-a-side football
Representing Brazil
Paralympic Games
Silver medal – second place	2004 Athens	Team
Bronze medal – third place	2000 Sydney	Team

Luciano Rocha (born 15 June 1979) is a Brazilian Paralympic footballer.

== Biography ==
Rocha is a Paralympic footballer who won Bronze medal for being a participant at 2000 Summer Paralympics in Sydney, Australia and was awarded Silver medal for 2004 Summer Paralympics in Athens, Greece. During the 2004 season he have scored 4th goal when played against Argentina, which led his team to 4–0 win, but because of a brawl ended up in 4–1 defeat.
