= Márcia Malsar =

Brazilian Paralympic sprinter

Marcia Malsar
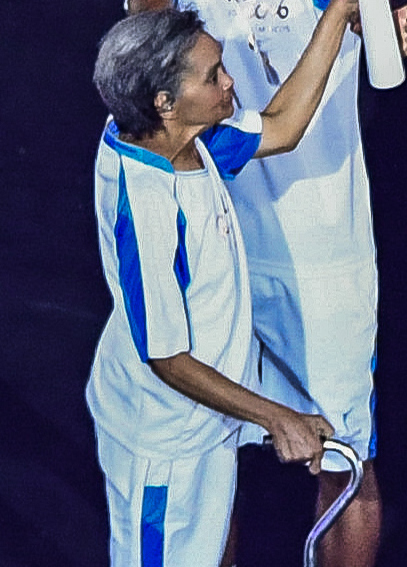
- Malsar at the 2016 Paralympics

Personal information
- Born: 1957 or 1958 (age 68–69)

Sport
- Sport: Para athletics
- Disability class: C6
Medal record
Representing Brazil
Paralympic Games
Gold medal – first place	1984 New York	200 m C6
Silver medal – second place	1984 New York	1000 m C6
Bronze medal – third place	1984 New York	60 m C6
Silver medal – second place	1988 Seoul	100 m C6

Márcia Malsar (born 1957 or 1958) is a retired Brazilian Paralympic sprinter. In 1984, she became the first Brazilian athlete ever to win a Paralympic gold medal. She won three more medals at the 1984 and 1988 Paralympics and competed in 1992. Malsar carried the Paralympic torch during the opening ceremony of the 2016 Paralympic Games in Rio de Janeiro.
