= Anderson Santos =

Brazilian Paralympic athlete

Personal information
- Full name: Anderson Lopes Santos
- Born: 1971 or 1972 (age 54–55)

Sport
- Sport: Para athletics
- Disability class: F36, F37
- Event(s): Discus throw, Javelin throw, Shot put
Medal record
Men's para athletics
Representing Brazil
Paralympic Games
Bronze medal – third place	1996 Atlanta	Discus throw - F36
Bronze medal – third place	2000 Sydney	Discus throw - F37
World Championships
Bronze medal – third place	1994 Berlin	Discus throw - F36
Bronze medal – third place	1998 Birmingham	Discus throw - F37

Anderson Lopes Santos (Note: This name uses Portuguese naming customs: the first or maternal family name is Lopes and the second or paternal family name is Santos.) is a Paralympic athlete from Brazil competing mainly in category F37 throwing events.

Anderson won a bronze medal in the F36 discus throw at the 1996 Summer Paralympics. At the 2000 he won a bronze medal in the F37 discus as well as competing in the javelin throw.
