= Luiz Cláudio Pereira =

Brazilian Paralympic athlete (c. 1961–2022)

Personal information
- Born: 10 June 1961 Rio de Janeiro, Brazil
- Died: 8 March 2022 (aged 60) Medellín, Colombia

Sport
- Sport: Para athletics
- Disability class: THW4
- Event(s): Shot put, Javelin, Discus
Medal record
Men's para athletics
Representing Brazil
Paralympic Games
| Gold medal – first place | 1984 Stoke Mandeville | Javelin throw - 1C |
| Gold medal – first place | 1984 Stoke Mandeville | Shot put - 1C |
| Gold medal – first place | 1988 Seoul | Discus throw - 1C |
| Gold medal – first place | 1988 Seoul | Javelin throw - 1C |
| Gold medal – first place | 1988 Seoul | Shot put - 1C |
| Gold medal – first place | 1992 Barcelona | Shot put - THW4 |
| Silver medal – second place | 1984 Stoke Mandeville | Discus throw - 1C |
| Silver medal – second place | 1984 Stoke Mandeville | Pentathlon - 1C |
| Silver medal – second place | 1988 Seoul | Pentathlon - 1C |

Luiz Cláudio Pereira (10 June 1961 – 8 March 2022) was a Brazilian paralympic athlete who competed mainly in category THW4 throwing events.

Pereira was part of the Brazilian team that travelled to Barcelona for the 1992 Summer Paralympics. There he competed in all three throws, finishing ninth in the discus throw, seventh in the javelin throw, and winning in the shot put. After retiring from athletics, Pereira was one of the pioneers of wheelchair rugby in Brazil.

Pereira died on 8 March 2022, at the age of 60.
