= Brazilian Paralympic Committee =

National Paralympic Committee of Brazil

Brazilian Paralympic Committee Comitê Paralímpico Brasileiro

National Paralympic Committee
- Country: Brazil
- Code: BRA
- Created: 1995
- Continental association: APC
- President: Mizael Conrado
- Website: www.cpb.org.br

The Brazilian Paralympic Committee (BPC; Portuguese: Comitê Paralímpico Brasileiro – CPB) is the private, non-profit organization representing Brazilian Paralympic athletes in the Paralympic Games and the Parapan American Games. It is the governing body of Brazilian Paralympic sport.

== See also ==
- Brazil at the Paralympics
- Brazilian Olympic Committee
