= Yugoslavia at the 1960 Summer Paralympics =

- Flag of Yugoslavia
- IPC code: YUG

in Rome
- Competitors: 4 in 2 sports
- Medals Ranked -th: Gold 0 Silver 0 Bronze 0 Total 0

Summer Paralympics appearances (overview)
- 1960; 1964–1968; 1972; 1976; 1980; 1984; 1988; 1992; 1996; 2000

Other related appearances
- Independent Paralympic Participants (1992); Bosnia and Herzegovina (1992–pres.); Croatia (1992–pres.); Serbia and Montenegro (2004); North Macedonia (1996–pres.); Slovenia (1992–pres.); Montenegro (2008–pres.); Serbia (2008–pres.)

Yugoslavia competed at the 1960 Summer Paralympics in Rome, Italy. The delegation consisted of four competitors: three track and field athletes and one swimmer.

== Disability classifications ==
Athletes at the first Paralympics in 1960 were all afflicted by spinal cord injuries and required the use of a wheelchair. This is in contrast to later Paralympics that include events for participants that fit into any of five different disability categories; amputation, either congenital or sustained through injury or illness; cerebral palsy; wheelchair athletes; visual impairment, including blindness; Les autres, any physical disability that does not fall strictly under one of the other categories, for example dwarfism or multiple sclerosis. Each Paralympic sport then has its own classifications, dependent upon the specific physical demands of competition. Events are given a code, made of numbers and letters, describing the type of event and classification of the athletes competing.

== Athletics ==
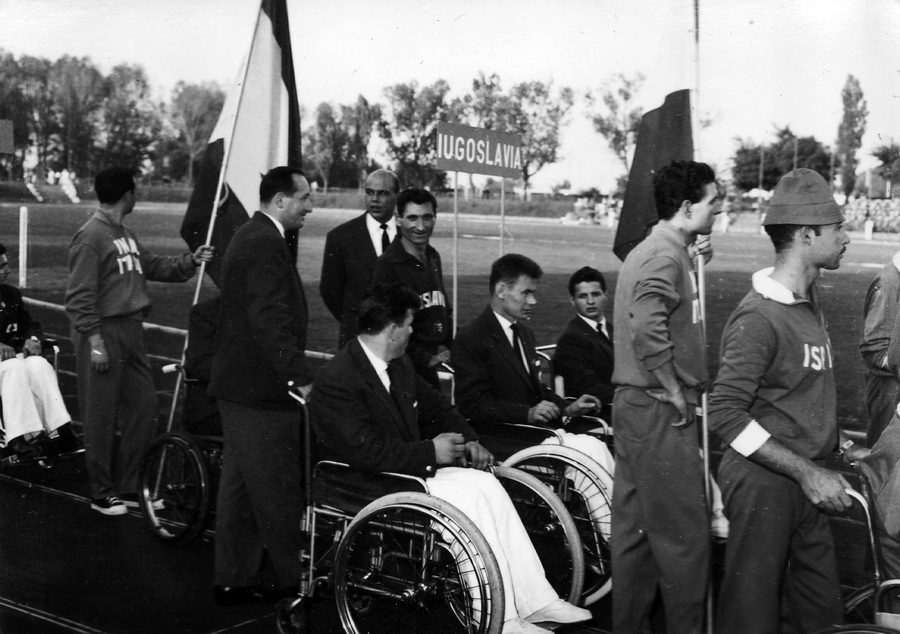
Yugoslavia delegation at the opening ceremony in Rome

Men

Athlete	Event	Qualification		Final	
Athlete	Event	Width	Rank	Width	Rank
Lugonja	Men's Club Throw A	20.39	21	Did not advance	
Jovanovic	Men's Club Throw C	31.95	18	Did not advance	
Markovic	Men's Club Throw C	30.35	21	Did not advance	

Sources: IPC, IPC

== Swimming ==
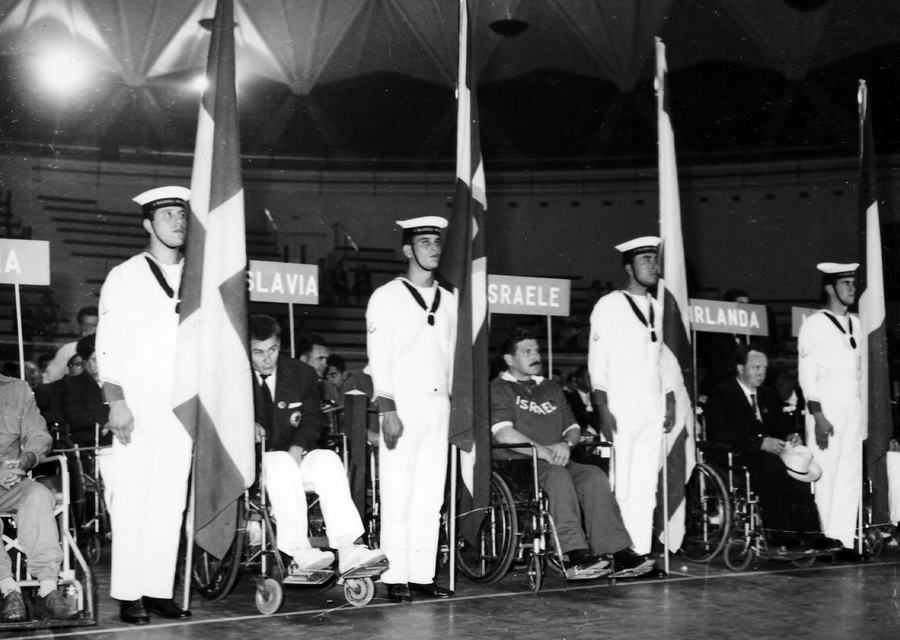
Yugoslavia at the closing ceremony in Rome 1960

Men

Athlete	Event	Final	
Athlete	Event	Time	Rank
Onukevic	25 m Breaststroke C/2	0:59.4	7

Source: IPC

== See also ==
- Yugoslavia at the 1960 Summer Olympics
- Yugoslavia at the Paralympics
