= Montenegro at the 2020 Summer Paralympics =

- IPC code: MNE
- NPC: Paralympic Committee of Montenegro
- Website: www.pokcg.org

in Tokyo
- Competitors: 5 in 3 sports
- Flag bearers: Filip Radovic, Marijana Goranovic
- Medals Ranked 78th: Gold 0 Silver 0 Bronze 1 Total 1

Summer Paralympics appearances (overview)
- 2008; 2012; 2016; 2020; 2024

Other related appearances
- Yugoslavia (1972–2000); Independent Paralympic Participants (1992); Serbia and Montenegro (2004)

Montenegro competed at the 2020 Summer Paralympics in Tokyo, Japan, from 24 August to 5 September 2021.

== Medalists ==
Medal	Name	Sport	Event	Date
Bronze	Filip Radović	Table tennis	Men's individual class 10	28 August

== Competitors ==
Sport	Men	Women	Total	Events			
Sport	Men	Women	Total	Men	Women	Mixed	Total
Athletics	1	1	2	1	2	0	3
Swimming	1	0	1	1	0	0	1
Table Tennis	2	0	2	2	0	0	2
Total	4	1	5	4	2	0	6

== Athletics ==
Montenegro entered two athletes into the athletics competition at the games.

Key

- SB = Season Best

=== Men ===
Field

Athlete	Event	Final	
Athlete	Event	Distance	Position
Miloš Spaić	Shot Put F11	10.99 SB	10

=== Women ===
Field

Athlete	Event	Final	
Athlete	Event	Distance	Position
Marijana Goranović	Shot Put F41	6.35	10
Marijana Goranović	Discus Throw F41	16.22	11

== Swimming ==
Montenegro entered one athlete into the swimming competition at the games.

Men

Athlete	Event	Heat		Final	
Athlete	Event	Time	Rank	Time	Rank
Ilija Tadić	50m Freestyle S9	26.86	17	Did not advance	

== Table tennis ==
Montenegro entered one athletes into the table tennis competition at the games. Filip Radović qualified via World Ranking allocation.

Men

Athlete	Event	Group stage				Round of 16	Quarterfinals	Semifinals	Final	
Athlete	Event	Opposition Result	Opposition Result	Opposition Result	Rank	Opposition Result	Opposition Result	Opposition Result	Opposition Result	Rank
Filip Radović	Individual C10	Coughlan (AUS); W 3−1	Lian H (CHN); W 3−2	Olufemi (NGR); W 3−0	1 Q	—N/a	Gardos (AUT); W 3−1	Chojnowski (POL); L 1−3	Did not advance	3rd place, bronze medalist(s)
Luka Bakić	Individual C10	Jacobs (INA); L 0−3	Ruiz Reyes (ESP); W 3−0	—N/a	2 Q	—N/a	Chojnowski (POL); L 0−3	Did not advance		
Filip Radović; Luka Bakić	Team C9-10	—N/a				Bye	Nigeria (NGR); L 0−2	Did not advance		
