= Yugoslavia at the 1996 Summer Paralympics =

- IPC code: YUG

in Atlanta
- Competitors: 10 (8 men and 2 women)
- Medals Ranked 41st: Gold 2 Silver 2 Bronze 0 Total 4

Summer Paralympics appearances (overview)
- 1960; 1964–1968; 1972; 1976; 1980; 1984; 1988; 1992; 1996; 2000

Other related appearances
- Independent Paralympic Participants (1992); Bosnia and Herzegovina (1992–pres.); Croatia (1992–pres.); Serbia and Montenegro (2004); North Macedonia (1996–pres.); Slovenia (1992–pres.); Montenegro (2008–pres.); Serbia (2008–pres.)

Ten athletes (eight men and two women) from Yugoslavia competed at the 1996 Summer Paralympics in Atlanta, United States.

== Medalists ==
Medal	Name	Sport	Event
Gold	Ružica Aleksov	Shooting	Women's air pistol SH1
Gold	Zlatko Kesler	Table tennis	Men's Singles 3
Silver	Ružica Aleksov	Shooting	Mixed free pistol .22 SH1
Silver	Nenad Krišanović	Swimming	Men's 50 m breaststroke SB2

== See also ==
- Yugoslavia at the Paralympics
- Yugoslavia at the 1996 Summer Olympics
