= Yugoslavia at the 1984 Summer Paralympics =

- IPC code: YUG

in Stoke Mandeville/New York
- Competitors: 30
- Medals Ranked 20th: Gold 11 Silver 10 Bronze 11 Total 32

Summer Paralympics appearances (overview)
- 1960; 1964–1968; 1972; 1976; 1980; 1984; 1988; 1992; 1996; 2000

Other related appearances
- Independent Paralympic Participants (1992); Bosnia and Herzegovina (1992–pres.); Croatia (1992–pres.); Serbia and Montenegro (2004); North Macedonia (1996–pres.); Slovenia (1992–pres.); Montenegro (2008–pres.); Serbia (2008–pres.)

Yugoslavia competed at the 1984 Summer Paralympics in Stoke Mandeville, Great Britain and New York City, United States. 30 competitors from Yugoslavia won 32 medals including 11 gold, 10 silver and 11 bronze and finished 20th in the medal table.

== See also ==
- Yugoslavia at the Paralympics
- Yugoslavia at the 1984 Summer Olympics
