= Yugoslavia at the 1988 Summer Paralympics =

- IPC code: YUG

in Seoul
- Competitors: 35
- Medals Ranked 27th: Gold 4 Silver 4 Bronze 11 Total 19

Summer Paralympics appearances (overview)
- 1960; 1964–1968; 1972; 1976; 1980; 1984; 1988; 1992; 1996; 2000

Other related appearances
- Independent Paralympic Participants (1992); Bosnia and Herzegovina (1992–pres.); Croatia (1992–pres.); Serbia and Montenegro (2004); North Macedonia (1996–pres.); Slovenia (1992–pres.); Montenegro (2008–pres.); Serbia (2008–pres.)

Yugoslavia competed at the 1988 Summer Paralympics in Seoul, South Korea. 35 competitors from Yugoslavia won 19 medals including 4 gold, 4 silver and 11 bronze and finished 27th in the medal table.

== See also ==
- Yugoslavia at the Paralympics
- Yugoslavia at the 1988 Summer Olympics
