= Montenegro at the 2016 Summer Paralympics =

- IPC code: MNE
- NPC: Paralympic Committee of Montenegro
- Website: www.pokcg.org

in Rio de Janeiro
- Competitors: 2 in 2 sports
- Flag bearer: Ilija Tadić
- Medals: Gold 0 Silver 0 Bronze 0 Total 0

Summer Paralympics appearances (overview)
- 2008; 2012; 2016; 2020; 2024

Other related appearances
- Yugoslavia (1972–2000); Independent Paralympic Participants (1992); Serbia and Montenegro (2004)

Montenegro sent a delegation to compete at the 2016 Summer Paralympics in Rio de Janeiro, Brazil, from 7 to 18 September 2016. This was the nation's third time competing at a Paralympic Games since it became independent from its federation with Serbia in June 2006. Montenegro was represented by two athletes in Rio de Janeiro: shot putter and discus thrower Marijana Goranović and short-distance swimmer Ilija Tadić. Goranović competed in two events in field and her best finish was in the women's shot put F41 competition, where she came eighth. Tadić took part in two swimming events and his best performance was in the men's 50 metre freestyle S9 tournament, where he placed 14th overall and did not advance to the final.

== Background ==
Montenegro became an independent country from its federation with Serbia on 3 June 2006 after a referendum on Montenegrin independence the month before. The country made its debut at the 2008 Beijing Summer Paralympic Games, and have appeared in every Summer Paralympics since, making Rio de Janeiro its third appearance at a Summer Paralympiad as an independent nation. Montenegro has not won its first medal at a Paralympic Games and has yet to debut in the Winter Paralympics. The 2016 Summer Paralympics were held from 7–18 September 2016 with a total of 4,328 athletes representing 159 National Paralympic Committees taking part. The Paralympic Committee of Montenegro sent two athletes to compete at the Rio Paralympics: shot putter and discus thrower Marijana Goranović and Ilija Tadić, a short-distance swimmer. Tadić was selected to be the flag bearer for the parade of nations during the opening ceremony.

== Disability classifications ==
Every participant at the Paralympics has their disability grouped into one of five disability categories; amputation, the condition may be congenital or sustained through injury or illness; cerebral palsy; wheelchair athletes, there is often overlap between this and other categories; visual impairment, including blindness; Les autres, any physical disability that does not fall strictly under one of the other categories, for example dwarfism or multiple sclerosis. Each Paralympic sport then has its own classifications, dependent upon the specific physical demands of competition. Events are given a code, made of numbers and letters, describing the type of event and classification of the athletes competing. Some sports, such as athletics, divide athletes by both the category and severity of their disabilities, other sports, for example swimming, group competitors from different categories together, the only separation being based on the severity of the disability.

== Athletics ==
At the time of the Rio Paralympics, Marijana Goranović was 27 years old. She was competing in her second Paralympic Games, having previously represented Montenegro at the 2012 Summer Paralympics. Goranović's disability is congenital; she is a person of short stature and is classified as F41. She qualified for the Rio Games by meeting the "A" qualifying standards for the women's shot put and discus throw events at a meeting in the Montenegrin town of Bar in April 2016. This was officially confirmed by the International Paralympic Committee on 30 June. Before the Paralympics, Goranović said, "I had enough time to recover after throwing the ball, I felt the terrain and the atmosphere at the Olympic Stadium, I have done two training sessions, and I've thrown over 20 meters, and I hope to repeat it when it's needed the most." On 9 September, she competed in the women's shout put F41, finishing eighth out of nine athletes, with a mark of 6.57 metres. Six days later, Goranović participated in the discus throw F40–41. She placed ninth out of thirteen finishing athletes with a new personal best mark of 19.28 metres. (Note: One athlete, Lauritta Onye, did not start.)

Women's Field

Athlete	Events	Result	Rank
Marijana Goranović	Shot Put F41	6.57	8
Marijana Goranović	Discus F40-41	19.28	9

== Swimming ==
Competing in his first Paralympic Games, Ilija Tadić was 17 years old at the time of the Rio Summer Paralympics. He is classified as S9 because his left arm is amputated below the elbow. Tadić qualified for these Paralympics at an internationally sanctioned meeting in the Croatian city of Split in January 2016 because his best time of 26.65 seconds was three-hundredths of a second faster than the "A" qualifying standard for the men's 50 metre freestyle S9 event. He said before the Games that his objective was to justify the expectations put upon him by the Montenegrin delegation by finishing with the best possible result. Tadić competed in the heat stages of the men's 100 metres freestyle S9 competition on 12 September. Assigned to heat two, he came sixth out of seven swimmers, with a time of 59.91 seconds. Only the top eight between all three heats could advance to the finals, and Tadić was eliminated since he ranked 17th overall. The next day, he was drawn to the third heat of the men's 50 metres freestyle S9 competition, finishing with a time of 27.60 seconds, which put him joint in fifth and last position with Cody Bureau of the United States. Tadić did not advance to the final since only the top eight swimmers were permitted in the last stage of the tournament.

Men

Athlete	Events	Heats		Final	
Athlete	Events	Time	Rank	Time	Rank
Ilija Tadić	50 m freestyle S9	27.60	14	did not advance	
Ilija Tadić	100 m freestyle S9	59.91	17	did not advance	

== See also ==
- Montenegro at the 2016 Summer Olympics
