= Montenegro at the 2024 Summer Paralympics =

- IPC code: MNE
- NPC: Paralympic Committee of Montenegro
- Website: www.pokcg.org

in Paris, France August 28, 2024 – September 8, 2024
- Competitors: 4 in 3 sports
- Flag bearers: Luka Bakić; Maja Rajković
- Medals Ranked 79th: Gold 0 Silver 0 Bronze 1 Total 1

Summer Paralympics appearances (overview)
- 2008; 2012; 2016; 2020; 2024

Other related appearances
- Yugoslavia (1972–2000); Independent Paralympic Participants (1992); Serbia and Montenegro (2004)

Montenegro competed at the 2024 Summer Paralympics in Paris, France, from 28 August to 8 September.

== Medalists ==
Medal	Name	Sport	Event	Date
Bronze	Filip Radović	Table tennis	Men's individual C10	3 September

== Competitors ==
The following is the list of number of competitors in the Games.

Sport	Men	Women	Total
Athletics	0	1	1
Shooting	1	0	1
Table tennis	2	0	3
Total	3	1	4

== Athletics ==
Montenegrin track and field athletes achieved quota places for the following events based on their results at the 2023 World Championships, 2024 World Championships, or through high performance allocation, as long as they meet the minimum entry standard (MES).

Key

- Note–Ranks given for track events are within the athlete's heat only
- Q = Qualified for the next round
- q = Qualified for the next round as a fastest loser or, in field events, by position without achieving the qualifying target
- DQ = Disqualified
- PR = Paralympic Record
- AR = Area (or continental) Record
- NR = National Record
- SB = Season's Best
- N/A = Round not applicable for the event
- Bye = Athlete not required to compete in round

Athlete	Event	Final	
Athlete	Event	Distance	Position
Maja Rajković	Women's javelin throw F54	12.63	6

== Shooting ==
Montenegro entered one para-shooter's after achieved quota places for the following events by virtue of their best finishes at the 2022, 2023 and 2024 world cup, 2022 World Championships and 2023 World Championships as long as they obtained a minimum qualifying score (MQS) by May 31, 2024.

Mixed

Athlete	Event	Qualification		Final	
Athlete	Event	Points	Rank	Points	Rank
Milan Đinović	R3 Mixed 10 metre air rifle prone SH1	629.3	26	Did not advance	

== Table tennis ==
Montenegro entered two athletes for the Paralympic games. All of them qualified for the games through the allocations of the final ITTF world ranking.

Athlete	Event	Round of 32	Round of 16	Quarterfinals	Semifinals	Final / BM	
Athlete	Event	Opposition Result	Opposition Result	Opposition Result	Opposition Result	Opposition Result	Rank
Filip Radović	Men's individual C10	—	Bye	Echaveguren (CHI); W 3–0	Lian (CHN); L 1–3	Did not advance	3rd place, bronze medalist(s)
Luka Bakić	Men's individual C10	—	Funayama (JPN); L 0–3	Did not advance			=9

== See also ==
- Montenegro at the 2024 Summer Olympics
- Montenegro at the Paralympics
