= Yugoslavia at the 2000 Summer Paralympics =

- Flag of Yugoslavia
- IPC code: YUG

in Sydney
- Competitors: 6 in 4 sports
- Medals Ranked 60th: Gold 0 Silver 1 Bronze 0 Total 1

Summer Paralympics appearances (overview)
- 1972; 1976; 1980; 1984; 1988; 1992; 1996; 2000

Other related appearances
- Independent Paralympic Participants (1992); Bosnia and Herzegovina (1992–); Croatia (1992–); Serbia and Montenegro (2004); North Macedonia (1996–); Slovenia (1992–); Montenegro (2008–); Serbia (2008–)

Yugoslavia competed at the 2000 Summer Paralympics in Sydney, Australia. The delegation consisted of six competitors: three track and field athletes, one sport shooter, one swimmer, and one table tennis player.

== Medalists ==
Medal	Name	Sport	Event
Silver	Zlatko Kesler	Table tennis	Men's singles 3

== See also ==
- Yugoslavia at the 2000 Summer Olympics
