= Montenegro at the 2008 Summer Paralympics =

- IPC code: MNE
- NPC: Paralympic Committee of Montenegro
- Website: www.pokcg.org

in Beijing
- Competitors: 1 in 1 sport
- Medals: Gold 0 Silver 0 Bronze 0 Total 0

Summer Paralympics appearances (overview)
- 2008; 2012; 2016; 2020; 2024

Other related appearances
- Yugoslavia (1972–2000); Independent Paralympic Participants (1992); Serbia and Montenegro (2004)

Montenegro sent a delegation to compete at the 2008 Summer Paralympics in Beijing, People's Republic of China.

== Swimming ==
Men

Athlete	Event	Class	Heat		Final	
Athlete	Event	Class	Result	Rank	Result	Rank
Dušan Dragović	Men's 50 metre freestyle	S10	27.86	15	Did not advance	

== See also ==
- Montenegro at the Paralympics
- Montenegro at the 2008 Summer Olympics
