= Montenegro at the 2012 Summer Paralympics =

- IPC code: MNE
- NPC: Paralympic Committee of Montenegro
- Website: www.pokcg.org

in London
- Competitors: 1 in 1 sport
- Medals: Gold 0 Silver 0 Bronze 0 Total 0

Summer Paralympics appearances (overview)
- 2008; 2012; 2016; 2020; 2024

Other related appearances
- Yugoslavia (1972–2000); Independent Paralympic Participants (1992); Serbia and Montenegro (2004)

Montenegro competed at the 2012 Summer Paralympics in London, United Kingdom, where it was represented by a single athlete - Marijana Goranović.

== Athletics ==
Women's Field Events

Athlete	Event	Distance	Rank
Marijana Goranović	Shot Put F40	6.35	7

== See also ==
- Montenegro at the 2012 Summer Olympics
