= Yugoslavia at the 1980 Summer Paralympics =

- IPC code: YUG

in Arnhem
- Competitors: 31
- Medals Ranked 23rd: Gold 4 Silver 5 Bronze 9 Total 18

Summer Paralympics appearances (overview)
- 1972; 1976; 1980; 1984; 1988; 1992; 1996; 2000

Other related appearances
- Independent Paralympic Participants (1992); Bosnia and Herzegovina (1992–); Croatia (1992–); Serbia and Montenegro (2004); North Macedonia (1996–); Slovenia (1992–); Montenegro (2008–); Serbia (2008–)

Yugoslavia competed at the 1980 Summer Paralympics in Arnhem, Netherlands. 31 competitors from Yugoslavia won 18 medals including 4 gold, 5 silver and 9 bronze and finished 23rd in the medal table.

== See also ==
- Yugoslavia at the Paralympics
- Yugoslavia at the 1980 Summer Olympics
