= Croatia at the 2026 Winter Paralympics =

- Flag of Croatia
- IOC code: CRO
- NOC: Croatian Olympic Committee
- Website: www.hoo.hr (in Croatian and English)

in Milan and Cortina d'Ampezzo, Italy 6 March 2026 – 15 March 2026
- Competitors: 5 (3 men and 2 women) in 2 sports
- Flag bearers (opening): Lucija Smetiško & Dino Sokolović
- Flag bearer (closing): Lucija Smetiško
- Medals: Gold 0 Silver 0 Bronze 0 Total 0

Winter Paralympics appearances (overview)
- 2002; 2006; 2010; 2014; 2018; 2022; 2026

Other related appearances
- Yugoslavia (1972–1988)

Croatia competed at the 14th Winter Paralympics in Milan and Cortina d'Ampezzo, from 6 to 15 March 2026., with five competitors in two sports.

These were fourth Paralympics for Dino Sokolović.

== Competitors ==
The following is the list of number of competitors participating at the Games per sport/discipline.

Sport	Men	Women	Total
Para alpine skiing	2	2	4
Para snowboard	1	0	1
Total	3	2	5

== Para alpine skiing ==
Athlete	Class	Event	Run 1		Run 2		Total	
Athlete	Class	Event	Time	Rank	Time	Rank	Time	Rank
Petar Kordić; Guide: Marija Coch	AS4	Men's giant slalom, visually impaired	1:23.29	15	1:20.88	13	2:44.17	13
Petar Kordić; Guide: Marija Coch	AS4	Men's slalom, visually impaired	DNF					
Dino Sokolović	LW12-2	Men's giant slalom, sitting	1:15.19	15	1:14.98	12	2:30.17	14
Dino Sokolović	LW12-2	Men's slalom, sitting	50.78	13	45.66	10	1:36.44	11
Karla Kordić; Guide: Ivo Hrŝak	AS4	Women's slalom, visually impaired	1:03.96	13	1:02.61	13	2:06.57	13
Lucija Smetiško	LW6/8–2	Women's giant slalom, standing	1:21.72	14	1:21.88	10	2:43.60	11
Lucija Smetiško	LW6/8–2	Women's slalom, standing	48.11	11	52.09	12	1:40.20	12

== Para snowboard ==
Banked slalom

Athlete	Event	Run 1	Run 2	Best	Rank
Bruno Bošnjak	Men's banked slalom, SB-LL1	1:03.56	DSQ	1:03.56	9

Snowboard cross

Athlete	Event	Seeding		Quarterfinal	Semifinal	Final	
Athlete	Event	Time	Rank	Position	Position	Position	Rank
Bruno Bošnjak	Men's snowboard cross, SB-LL1	57.48	10	3	Did not advance		

== Broadcasting ==
Croatian Radiotelevision's HRT 2 broadcast the Games.

== See also ==
- Croatia at the 2026 Winter Olympics
