= Slovenia at the 2026 Winter Paralympics =

- Flag of Slovenia
- IPC code: SLO
- NPC: Sports Federation for the Disabled of Slovenia

in Milan & Cortina d'Ampezzo, Italy 6 March 2026 – 15 March 2026
- Competitors: 2 (1 man and 1 woman) in 2 sports
- Medals: Gold 0 Silver 0 Bronze 0 Total 0

Winter Paralympics appearances (overview)
- 1998; 2002; 2006; 2010; 2014; 2018; 2022; 2026

Other related appearances
- Yugoslavia (1972–1988)

Slovenia will compete at the 2026 Winter Paralympics in Milan & Cortina d'Ampezzo, Italy, which will take place between 6–15 March 2026.

== Competitors ==
The following is the list of number of competitors participating at the Games per sport/discipline.

Sport	Men	Women	Total
Para alpine skiing	1	0	1
Para cross-country skiing	0	1	1
Total	1	1	2

== Para alpine skiing ==
Athlete	Class	Event	Run 1		Run 2		Total	
Athlete	Class	Event	Time	Rank	Time	Rank	Time	Rank
Jernej Slivnik	LW11	Men's super-G, sitting	—N/a				1:23.21	18
Jernej Slivnik	LW11	Men's giant slalom, sitting	1:11.03	10	1:15.46	15	2:26.49	9

== Para cross-country skiing ==
Athlete	Class	Event	Qualification		Semifinal		Final	
Athlete	Class	Event	Time	Rank	Time	Rank	Time	Rank
Tabea Dolžan	LW3	Women's sprint classical, standing	4:16.24	17	Did not advance			
Tabea Dolžan	LW3	Women's 10 km classical, standing	—N/a				47:04.8	11

== See also ==
- Slovenia at the Paralympics
- Slovenia at the 2026 Winter Olympics
