= Croatia at the 2018 Winter Paralympics =

- IPC code: CRO
- NPC: Croatian Paralympic Committee
- Website: www.hpo.hr

in Pyeongchang
- Competitors: 7 in 3 sports
- Flag bearer: Eva Goluža
- Medals Ranked 22nd: Gold 1 Silver 0 Bronze 1 Total 2

Winter Paralympics appearances (overview)
- 2002; 2006; 2010; 2014; 2018; 2022; 2026

Other related appearances
- Yugoslavia (1972–1988)

Croatia sent seven competitors to the 2018 Winter Paralympics in Pyeongchang, South Korea, in three disciplines - alpine skiing, cross-country skiing and snowboarding. Snowboarder Bruno Bošnjak won a bronze medal, the first ever medal for Croatia at any Winter Paralympic Games.

== Medalists ==
Medal	Name	Sport	Event	Date
Gold	Dino Sokolović	Alpine skiing	Men's slalom, sitting	March 17
Bronze	Bruno Bošnjak	Snowboarding	Men's banked slalom SB-LL1	March 16

== Alpine skiing ==
Women

Athlete	Event	Class	Run 1	Run 2	Total	Rank
Eva Goluža; Guide: Ana Žigman	Giant slalom	Visually impaired	1:28.28	1:29.85	2:58.13	12
Eva Goluža; Guide: Ana Žigman	Slalom	Visually impaired	1:10.27	DNF	–	–

Men

Athlete	Event	Class	Run 1	Run 2	Total	Rank
Lovro Dokić	Slalom	Standing	1:07.61	1:03.64	2:11.25	22
Damir Mizdrak	Slalom	Visually impaired	1:01.72	59.60	2:01.32	9
Dino Sokolović	Giant slalom	Sitting			2:26.09	15
Dino Sokolović	Slalom	Sitting	49.13	50.69	1:39.82	1st place, gold medalist(s)
Dino Sokolović	Super combined	Sitting	1:31.65	49.07	2:20.72	9
Dino Sokolović	Super-G	Sitting	-	-	1:33.48	19
Dino Sokolović	Downhill	Sitting	-	-	1:32.20	17

== Cross-country skiing ==
Men

Athlete	Event	Class	Qualification			Semifinal			Final		
Athlete	Event	Class	Real time	Calculated time	Rank	Real time	Calculated time	Rank	Real time	Calculated time	Rank
Antun Bošnjaković	1.5km sprint classical	Standing	5:37.57	4:53.69	24	—N/a					
Antun Bošnjaković	10km classical	Standing	DNS			—N/a					
Josip Zima	1.5km sprint classical	Sitting	10:01.36	9:25.28	35	—N/a					
Josip Zima	7.5km classical	Sitting	DNS			—N/a					

== Snowboarding ==
Men

Athlete	Event	Class	Run 1	Run 2	Run 3	Best	Rank
Bruno Bošnjak	Banked slalom	SB-LL1	57.23	54.08	1:02.68	54.08	3rd place, bronze medalist(s)
Bruno Bošnjak	Snowboard cross	SB-LL1	1:04.91	-	-	-	6

== See also ==
- Croatia at the 2018 Winter Olympics
- Croatia at the Paralympics
