= Croatia at the 2010 Winter Paralympics =

- IPC code: CRO
- NPC: Croatian Paralympic Committee
- Website: www.hpo.hr

in Vancouver
- Competitors: 4 in 1 sport
- Flag bearer: Mario Dadić
- Medals: Gold 0 Silver 0 Bronze 0 Total 0

Winter Paralympics appearances (overview)
- 2002; 2006; 2010; 2014; 2018; 2022; 2026

Other related appearances
- Yugoslavia (1972–1988)

Croatia sent a delegation to compete at the 2010 Winter Paralympics in Vancouver. A total of four athletes (three men and a woman) competed, all in alpine skiing.

== Alpine skiing ==
Women

Athlete	Event	Class	Run 1	Run 2	Total	Rank
Nikolina Santek	Giant slalom	Visually impaired	dns	–	–	–
Nikolina Santek	Slalom	Visually impaired	1:22.20	dnf	–	–

Men

Athlete	Event	Class	Run 1	Run 2	Total	Rank
Mario Dadić	Giant slalom	Standing	1:40.72	1:44.65	3:25.37	36
Mario Dadić	Slalom	Standing	1:12.67	1:15.46	2:28.13	37
Zlatko Pesjak	Giant slalom	Standing	1:28.75	1:28.92	2:57.67	33
Zlatko Pesjak	Slalom	Standing	1:03.47	dnf	–	–
Dino Sokolović	Giant slalom	Sitting	dsq	–	–	–
Dino Sokolović	Slalom	Sitting	58.58	1:04.86	2:03.44	21

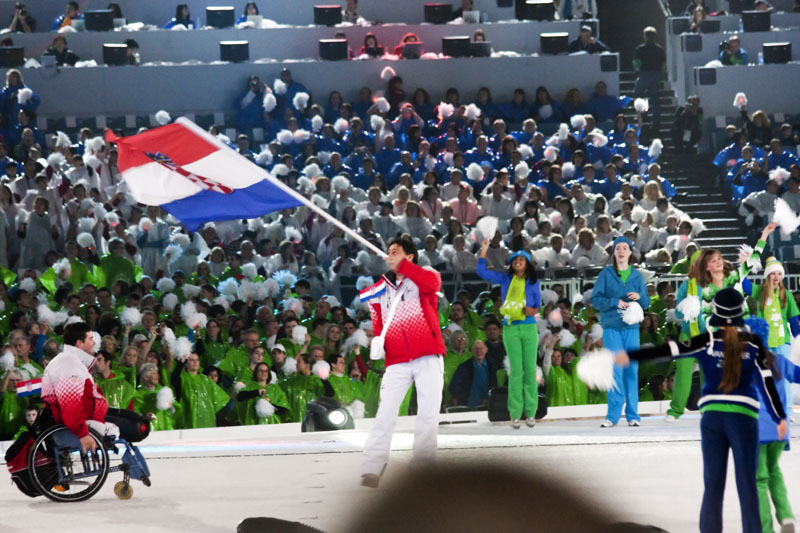
Flag bearer Mario Dadić, as the Croatian delegation is entering the stadium during the opening ceremonies.

== See also ==
- Croatia at the 2010 Winter Olympics
- Croatia at the Paralympics
