= Yugoslavia at the 1980 Winter Paralympics =

- Flag of Yugoslavia
- IPC code: YUG
- Competitors: 9 (9 men and 0 women)
- Medals Ranked 11th: Gold 0 Silver 0 Bronze 0 Total 0

Winter Paralympics appearances (overview)
- 1976; 1980; 1984; 1988

Other related appearances
- Bosnia and Herzegovina (2010–pres.); Slovenia (1998–pres.); Croatia (2002–pres.); Serbia (2010–pres.)

Yugoslavia competed at the 1980 Winter Paralympics in Geilo, Norway. Nine competitors from Yugoslavia competed in two sports but did not win a medal. The country finished 11th in the medal table.

== Alpine skiing ==
Five athletes competed in alpine skiing and they competed in the following events:

- Men's Giant Slalom 3A
- Men's Slalom 3A
- Men's Giant Slalom 1A
- Men's Slalom 1A

No medals were won.

== Cross-country ==
Four athletes competed in cross-country skiing. No medals were won.

== See also ==
- Yugoslavia at the Paralympics
- Yugoslavia at the 1980 Winter Olympics
