= Yugoslavia at the 1984 Winter Paralympics =

- Flag of Yugoslavia
- IPC code: YUG

in Innsbruck
- Competitors: 10 (10 men and 0 women) in 2 sports
- Medals Ranked 13th: Gold 0 Silver 0 Bronze 1 Total 1

Winter Paralympics appearances (overview)
- 1976; 1980; 1984; 1988

Other related appearances
- Bosnia and Herzegovina (2010–pres.); Slovenia (1998–pres.); Croatia (2002–pres.); Serbia (2010–pres.)

Yugoslavia sent a delegation to compete at the 1984 Winter Paralympics, in Innsbruck, Austria.

Yugoslavia finished 13th in the gold medal and in the total medal count.

== Medalists ==
Medal	Name	Sport	Event	Date
Bronze	Franc Komar	Alpine skiing		

== Classification ==
Each event had separate standing, sitting, or visually impaired classifications:

- LW2 - standing: single leg amputation above the knee
- LW 3 - standing: double leg amputation below the knee, mild cerebral palsy, or equivalent impairment
- LW4 - standing: single leg amputation below the knee
- LW5/7 - standing: double arm amputation
- LW6/8 - standing: single arm amputation
- LW9 - standing: amputation or equivalent impairment of one arm and one leg
- B1 - visually impaired: no functional vision
- B2 - visually impaired: up to ca 3-5% functional vision

== Alpine skiing ==
Men

Athlete	Event	Run 1 (SG)			Run 2 (Sl)			Final/Total		
Athlete	Event	Time	Diff	Rank	Time	Diff	Rank	Time	Diff	Rank
Franc Komar	Alpine combination, LW6/8		+			+			+	3rd place, bronze medalist(s)

== See also ==
- Yugoslavia at the 1984 Winter Olympics
- Yugoslavia at the Paralympics
