= Slovenia at the 2022 Winter Paralympics =

- Flag of Slovenia
- IPC code: SLO
- NPC: Sports Federation for the Disabled of Slovenia
- Website: www.zsis.si

in Beijing, China 4 March 2022 – 13 March 2022
- Competitors: 1 (1 man) in 1 sport
- Flag bearer: Jernej Slivnik
- Medals: Gold 0 Silver 0 Bronze 0 Total 0

Winter Paralympics appearances (overview)
- 1998; 2002; 2006; 2010; 2014; 2018; 2022; 2026

Other related appearances
- Yugoslavia (1972–1988)

Slovenia competed at the 2022 Winter Paralympics in Beijing, China which took place between 4–13 March 2022.

== Competitors ==
The following is the list of number of competitors participating at the Games per sport/discipline.

Sport	Men	Women	Total
Alpine skiing	1	0	1
Total	1	0	1

== Alpine skiing ==
Jernej Slivnik competed in alpine skiing. He also represented Slovenia at the 2018 Winter Paralympics held in Pyeongchang, South Korea.

Athlete	Event	Run 1		Run 2		Total	
Athlete	Event	Time	Rank	Time	Rank	Time	Rank
Jernej Slivnik	Men's giant slalom, sitting	1:04.89	8	1:05.84	19	2:10.73	13
Jernej Slivnik	Men's slalom, sitting	46.73	9	Did not finish			

== See also ==
- Slovenia at the Paralympics
- Slovenia at the 2022 Winter Olympics
