= Croatia at the 2014 Winter Paralympics =

- IPC code: CRO
- NPC: Croatian Paralympic Committee
- Website: www.hpo.hr

in Sochi
- Competitors: 2 in 1 sport
- Medals: Gold 0 Silver 0 Bronze 0 Total 0

Winter Paralympics appearances (overview)
- 2002; 2006; 2010; 2014; 2018; 2022; 2026

Other related appearances
- Yugoslavia (1972–1988)

Croatia competed at the 2014 Winter Paralympics in Sochi, Russia, held between 7–16 March 2014.

== Alpine skiing ==
Men

Athlete	Event	Run 1			Run 2			Final/Total		
Athlete	Event	Time	Diff	Rank	Time	Diff	Rank	Time	Diff	Rank
Damir Mizdrak; Guide: Luka Debeljak	Slalom, visually impaired	1:17.19	+27.50	16	1:27.67	+34.15	11	2:44.86	+1:01.65	11
Damir Mizdrak; Guide: Luka Debeljak	Giant slalom, visually impaired	1:51.27	+35.25	17	1:50.93	+37.68	14	3:42.20	+1:12.58	14
Dino Sokolovic	Super-G, sitting	—N/a						1:33.42	+13.91	13
Dino Sokolovic	Combined, sitting	DNF								
Dino Sokolovic	Slalom, sitting	52.74	-	1	DNF					
Dino Sokolovic	Giant slalom, sitting	1:24.67	+6.57	16	1:18.36	+4.26	12	2:43.03	+10.30	12

== See also ==
- Croatia at the Paralympics
- Croatia at the 2014 Winter Olympics
