= Yugoslavia at the 1988 Winter Paralympics =

- Flag of Yugoslavia
- IPC code: YUG

in Innsbruck
- Competitors: 3 in 1 sport
- Medals: Gold 0 Silver 0 Bronze 0 Total 0

Winter Paralympics appearances (overview)
- 1976; 1980; 1984; 1988

Other related appearances
- Bosnia and Herzegovina (2010–pres.); Slovenia (1998–pres.); Croatia (2002–pres.); Serbia (2010–pres.)

Yugoslavia competed at the 1988 Winter Paralympics in Innsbruck, Austria. The country's delegation consisted of three competitors in alpine skiing.

== Alpine skiing ==
Athlete	Event	Time	Rank
Stefan Ahacic	Men's downhill LW6/8	1:23.05	18
Stefan Ahacic	Men's giant slalom LW6/8	1:58.72	11
Stefan Ahacic	Men's slalom LW6/8	1:27.25	11
Sreco Kos	Men's downhill LW6/8	1:20.70	14
Sreco Kos	Men's giant slalom LW6/8	1:50.20	8
Sreco Kos	Men's slalom LW6/8	1:32.94	12
Jure Rejec	Men's downhill LW6/8	1:24.62	19
Jure Rejec	Men's giant slalom LW6/8	2:01.55	13
Jure Rejec	Men's slalom LW6/8	1:26.42	8

== See also ==
- Yugoslavia at the 1988 Winter Olympics
