= Croatia at the 2022 Winter Paralympics =

- Flag of Croatia
- IPC code: CRO
- NPC: Croatian Paralympic Committee
- Website: www.hpo.hr

in Beijing, China 4 March 2022 – 13 March 2022
- Competitors: 4 (3 men and 1 woman) in 3 sports
- Flag bearer: Bruno Bošnjak
- Medals: Gold 0 Silver 0 Bronze 0 Total 0

Winter Paralympics appearances (overview)
- 2002; 2006; 2010; 2014; 2018; 2022; 2026

Other related appearances
- Yugoslavia (1972–1988)

Croatia competed at the 2022 Winter Paralympics in Beijing, China which took place between 4–13 March 2022. In total, four athletes competed in three sports.

== Competitors ==
The following is the list of number of competitors participating at the Games per sport/discipline.

Sport	Men	Women	Total
Alpine skiing	1	1	2
Cross-country skiing	1	0	1
Snowboarding	1	0	1
Total	3	1	4

== Alpine skiing ==
Lucija Smetiško and Damir Mizdrak competed in alpine skiing.

Athlete	Event	Run 1		Run 2		Total	
Athlete	Event	Time	Rank	Time	Rank	Time	Rank
Damir Mizdrak; Guide: Marija Coch	Men's giant slalom, visually impaired	1:15.60	11	1:12.45	7	2:28.05	7
Damir Mizdrak; Guide: Marija Coch	Men's slalom, visually impaired	50.88	8	57.09	8	1:47.97	7
Lucija Smetiško	Women's giant slalom, standing	1:07.34	13	1:09.07	8	2:16.41	9
Lucija Smetiško	Women's slalom, standing	53.41	6	56.37	5	1:49.78	5

== Cross-country skiing ==
Josip Zima competed in cross-country skiing.

Athlete	Event	Qualification		Semifinal		Final	
Athlete	Event	Result	Rank	Result	Rank	Result	Rank
Josip Zima	Men's sprint, sitting	3:20.88	36	Did not advance			
Josip Zima	Men's middle distance, sitting	—N/a				52:17.2	33

== Snowboarding ==
One snowboarder competed in snowboarding.

Banked slalom

Athlete	Event	Run 1	Run 2	Best	Rank
Bruno Bošnjak	Men's SB-LL1	1:15.68	1:15.68	1:15.68	9

Snowboard cross

Athlete	Event	Qualification			Quarterfinal	Semifinal	Final
Athlete	Event	Run 1	Run 2	Rank	Position	Position	Position
Bruno Bošnjak	Men's SB-LL1	1:12.73	1:09.27	9 Q	3	did not advance	

Qualification legend: Q - Qualify to next round; FA - Qualify to medal final; FB - Qualify to consolation final

== See also ==
- Croatia at the Paralympics
- Croatia at the 2022 Winter Olympics
