= 2011 IPC Athletics World Championships – Men's shot put =

The men's shot put at the 2011 IPC Athletics World Championships was held at the QEII Stadium from 22–29 January.

In the Men's shot put F42, held on January 27, the Bronze was originally won by Fanie Lombaard of South Africa. However, he tested positive for Probenecid in a urine sample provided on 27 January 2011. The prohibited substance had been prescribed to him because of a medical problem, but he did not have a Therapeutic Use Exemption (TUE). The International Paralympic Committee (IPC) suspended him for a year (from January 27), and fined him 1,500 euros. The IPC redistributed the medals.

== Medalists ==
Class	Gold	Silver	Bronze
F11	David Casinos; Spain	Vasyl Lishchynskyi; Ukraine	Edwin Rodriguez Gonzales; Colombia
F12	Vladimir Andryushchenko; Russia	Russell Short; Australia	Siarhei Hrybanau; Belarus
F20	Jeffrey Ige; Sweden	Efstratios Nikolaidis; Greece	Krzysztof Kaczmarek; Poland
F32/33	Karim Bettina; Algeria	Kamel Kardjena; Algeria	Mounir Bakiri; Algeria
F34	Thierry Cibone; France	Dan West; Great Britain	Mohamed Ali Krid; Tunisia
F35/36	Pawel Piotrowski; Poland	Vladimir Sviridov; Russia	Guo Wei; China
F37/38	Ibrahim Ahmed Abdelwareth; Egypt	Oleksandr Doroshenko; Ukraine	Tomasz Blatkiewicz; Poland
F40	Hocine Gherzouli; Algeria	Paschalis Stathelakos; Greece	Alexandros Michail Konstantinidis; Greece
F42	Maxim Narozhnyy; Russia	Darko Kralj; Croatia	Aled Davies; Great Britain
F44/46	Jackie Christiansen; Denmark	Miltiadis Kyriakidis; Greece	Josip Slivar; Croatia
F52/53	Aigars Apinis; Latvia	Mauro Maximo de Jesus; Mexico	Ales Kisy; Czech Republic
F54/55/56	Karol Wojciech Kozun; Poland	Draženko Mitrović; Serbia	Ulrich Iser; Germany
F57/58	Alexey Ashapatov; Russia	Jamil Saleh Elshebli; Jordan	Michael Louwrens; South Africa

== F11 ==
The Men's shot put, F11 was held on January 24

- F11 = visual impairment: may range from no light perception in either eye to light perception with the inability to recognise the shape of a hand at any distance or in any direction.

=== Results ===
==== Final ====
Rank	Athlete	Nationality	#1	#2	#3	#4	#5	#6	Result	Notes
1st place, gold medalist(s)	David Casinos	Spain	12.72	12.45	12.54	12.93	12.60	x	12.93	
2nd place, silver medalist(s)	Vasyl Lishchynskyi	Ukraine	12.44	12.15	12.81	12.60	12.01	11.06	12.81	
3rd place, bronze medalist(s)	Edwin Rodriguez Gonzales	Colombia	x	8.32	9.62	10.72	10.51	x	10.72	
4	Hameed Hassain	Iraq	10.10	10.39	10.34	10.56	10.31	10.48	10.56	SB
5	Yuriy Piskov	Ukraine	10.41	10.31	x	x	x	x	10.41	
6	Miroslaw Madzia	Poland	10.34	10.07	9.90	10.28	10.23	x	10.34	
7	Konstantinos Bimpasis	Greece	9.82	10.16	9.78	x	9.29	9.87	10.16	
8	Sergio Paz	Argentina	x	9.75	9.19	9.95	x	9.82	9.95	
9	Nelson Goncalves	Portugal	8.86	8.61	8.45				8.86	

Key: SB = Season Best

== F12 ==
The Men's shot put, F12 was held on January 22 with the medal ceremony on January 23

- F12 = visual impairment: may have the ability to recognise the shape of a hand, have a visual acuity of 2/60 and/or visual field of less than 5 degrees.

=== Results ===
==== Final ====
Rank	Athlete	Nationality	#1	#2	#3	#4	#5	#6	Result	Notes
1st place, gold medalist(s)	Vladimir Andryushchenko	Russia	14.86	x	x	13.97	x	14.36	14.86	
2nd place, silver medalist(s)	Russell Short	Australia	13.65	13.61	14.22	x	13.26	x	14.22	
3rd place, bronze medalist(s)	Siarhei Hrybanau	Belarus	13.20	13.28	13.73	x	x	12.55	13.73	
4	Francois Badenhorst	South Africa	11.26	11.74	11.58	11.89	x	x	11.89	AR
5	Mahdi Al-Saadi	Iraq	x	9.85	9.57	9.93	9.46	x	9.93	

Key: AR = Asian Record

== F20 ==
The Men's shot put, F20 was held on January 29

- F20 = intellectual disability.

=== Results ===
==== Final ====
Rank	Athlete	Nationality	#1	#2	#3	#4	#5	#6	Result	Notes
1st place, gold medalist(s)	Jeffrey Ige	Sweden	13.17	13.20	13.73	13.71	13.75	13.56	13.75	WR
2nd place, silver medalist(s)	Efstratios Nikolaidis	Greece	11.70	13.14	12.28	x	11.84	12.55	13.14	
3rd place, bronze medalist(s)	Krzysztof Kaczmarek	Poland	12.20	12.44	x	12.72	12.27	12.17	12.72	
4	Danyelo Hernandez	Venezuela	11.74	11.09	10.90	10.50	10.70	10.24	11.74	
5	Christos Trapezanidis	Greece	x	11.57	11.56	11.29	11.70	10.82	11.70	
6	Athanasios Kyriakou	Greece	11.19	10.98	11.08	11.58	11.07	10.88	11.58	
7	Jose Antonio Exposito Pineiro	Spain	11.20	x	11.47	11.10	10.75	11.41	11.47	
8	Ricardo Marques	Portugal	11.42	11.19	x	11.22	11.33	11.35	11.42	
9	Oleg Shaydetskiy	Russia	9.38	x	8.74				9.38	
10	Leonid Ustyuzhanin	Russia	x	8.43	7.97				8.43	

Key: WR = World Record

== F32/33 ==
The Men's shot put, F32/33 was held on January 22

F32/33:

- F32 = poor functional strength in arms, legs and trunk, able to propel a wheelchair, compete in a wheelchair and may throw a club or discus from a throwing frame.
- F33 = some degree of trunk movement when pushing a wheelchair, forward trunk movement is limited during forceful pushing, throwing movements are mainly from the arm, compete in a wheelchair or from a throwing frame.

=== Results ===
==== Final ====
Rank	Athlete	Nationality	#1	#2	#3	#4	#5	#6	Result	Points	Notes
1st place, gold medalist(s)	Karim Bettina	Algeria	10.12	10.41	10.22	10.89	x	10.89	10.89	1024	WR
2nd place, silver medalist(s)	Kamel Kardjena	Algeria	x	10.09	10.97	11.61	x	12.24	12.24	1020	WR
3rd place, bronze medalist(s)	Mounir Bakiri	Algeria	6.95	9.22	x	7.71	9.69	x	9.69	978	
4	Dimitrios Zisidis	Greece	8.01	x	8.34	8.32	8.65	8.66	8.66	916	
5	Frantisek Serbus	Czech Republic	8.18	x	7.27	x	x	7.54	8.18	877	
6	Hassan Ali Obaid Malaleih	United Arab Emirates	8.23	8.63	x	8.27	7.89	8.06	8.63	820	
7	Ahmed Alhousani	United Arab Emirates	7.33	x	7.39	x	6.71	6.28	7.39	682	
8	Mourad Idoudi	Tunisia	6.34	x	6.80				6.80	602	
9	Hani Alnakhli	Saudi Arabia	x	6.10	x				6.10	496	

Key: WR = World Record

== F34 ==
The Men's shot put, F34 was held on January 22

- F34 = good functional strength with minimal limitation or control problems in the arms or trunk, compete in a wheelchair or from a throwing frame.

=== Results ===
==== Final ====
Rank	Athlete	Nationality	#1	#2	#3	#4	#5	#6	Result	Notes
1st place, gold medalist(s)	Thierry Cibone	France	11.33	11.14	11.53	9.65	10.74	x	11.53	WR
2nd place, silver medalist(s)	Dan West	Great Britain	10.93	11.37	11.16	9.75	11.02	10.88	11.37	
3rd place, bronze medalist(s)	Mohamed Ali Krid	Tunisia	x	9.86	10.41	x	10.00	x	10.41	AR
4	Kyle Pettey	Canada	x	x	10.21	x	x	x	10.21	
5	Sam Craven	United States	9.52	9.35	x	8.65	10.03	10.20	10.20	
6	Hamish MacDonald	Australia	10.15	9.95	9.87	9.70	9.83	10.18	10.18	
7	Darko Majdandzic	Croatia	9.18	9.53	9.86	x	9.52	9.32	9.86	
8	Damien Bowen	Australia	9.50	x	x	9.41	9.62	9.79	9.79	
9	Jean Pierre Talatini	France	9.40	x	x				9.40	
10	Faouzi Rzig	Tunisia	7.90	8.99	7.66				8.99	
11	Adel F. N. A. Alrashidi	Kuwait	8.28	8.46	8.74				8.74	
12	Raymond O'Dwyer	Ireland	7.04	7.65	7.29				7.65	
13	Siamak Saleh Farajzadeh	Iran	7.65	x	x				7.65	

Key: WR = World Record, AR = Asian Record

== F35/36 ==
The Men's shot put, F35/36 was held on January 23

F35/36:

- F35 = good static balance, problems in dynamic balance, may need assistive devices for walking but not when standing or throwing, may have sufficient lower extremity function to execute a run up when throwing.
- F36 = walk without assistance or assistive devices, have more control problems with upper than lower limbs. All four limbs are involved, dynamic often better than static balance. Hand control, grasp and release are affected when throwing.

=== Results ===
==== Final ====
Rank	Athlete	Nationality	#1	#2	#3	#4	#5	#6	Result	Points	Notes
1st place, gold medalist(s)	Pawel Piotrowski	Poland	13.77	12.58	12.35	12.60	13.15	x	13.77	1007	WR
2nd place, silver medalist(s)	Vladimir Sviridov	Russia	11.67	x	13.60	13.65	12.97	12.99	13.65	1004	SB
3rd place, bronze medalist(s)	Guo Wei	China	13.56	x	13.69	14.18	13.82	x	14.18	988	
4	Sebastian Dietz	Germany	12.08	12.91	12.55	11.97	12.46	x	12.91	981	SB
5	Edgards Bergs	Latvia	13.24	13.33	13.66	x	13.75	13.93	13.93	980	
6	Xinhan Fu	China	12.96	13.27	13.76	13.06	x	x	13.76	974	SB
7	Reginald Benade	Namibia	x	11.93	12.20	x	x	11.60	12.20	953	AR
8	Wenbo Wang	China	11.57	11.38	11.25	11.23	11.03	11.32	11.57	922	AR
9	Albin Vidović	Croatia	10.71	10.31	11.25				11.25	904	
10	Volodymyr Zhaivoronok	Ukraine	9.15	11.01	10.66				11.01	888	
11	Paulo Souza	Brazil	10.63	x	x				10.63	862	AR
12	Nicholas Newman	South Africa	9.51	x	x				9.51	763	
13	Duane Strydom	South Africa	x	7.10	8.86				8.86	691	

Key: WR = World Record, AR = Asian Record, SB = Season Best

== F37/38 ==
The Men's shot put, F37/38 was held on January 27

- F37 = spasticity in an arm and leg on the same side, good functional ability on the non impaired side, better development, good arm and hand control and follow through.
- F38 = meet the minimum disability criteria for athletes with cerebral palsy, head injury or stroke.

=== Results ===
==== Final ====
Rank	Athlete	Nationality	#1	#2	#3	#4	#5	#6	Result	Points	Notes
1st place, gold medalist(s)	Ibrahim Ahmed Abdelwareth	Egypt	10.35	15.22	15.58	12.65	12.39	12.74	15.58	1008	WR
2nd place, silver medalist(s)	Oleksandr Doroshenko	Ukraine	13.26	13.99	14.00	14.01	14.13	13.77	14.13	967	
3rd place, bronze medalist(s)	Tomasz Blatkiewicz	Poland	11.58	13.75	14.22	14.73	14.67	14.28	14.73	943	SB
4	Mykola Zhabnyak	Ukraine	12.58	x	13.09	13.17	12.78	12.98	13.17	867	SB
5	Xuelong Zhang	China	12.41	12.90	11.96	12.73	12.72	12.85	12.90	851	SB
6	Alexey Lesnykh	Russia	11.88	11.76	11.61	12.16	11.49	12.64	12.64	834	
7	Mohamed Mohamed Ramadan	Egypt	11.77	11.87	12.36	x	12.04	12.39	12.39	816	AR
8	Khusniddin Norbekov	Uzbekistan	12.25	11.73	11.85	12.19	11.90	11.95	12.25	806	
9	Gerrit Johannes Kruger	South Africa	11.34	11.56	10.77				11.56	751	
10	Juanre Jenkinson	South Africa	9.72	8.98	9.01				9.72	661	

Key: WR = World Record, AR = Area Record, SB = Season Best

== F40 ==
The Men's shot put, F40 was held on January 25

F40 = dwarfism.

=== Results ===
==== Final ====
Rank	Athlete	Nationality	#1	#2	#3	#4	#5	#6	Result	Notes
1st place, gold medalist(s)	Hocine Gherzouli	Algeria	10.18	10.86	11.11	11.81	11.87	12.21	12.21	WR
2nd place, silver medalist(s)	Paschalis Stathelakos	Greece	11.83	12.00	11.68	11.61	x	11.76	12.00	AR
3rd place, bronze medalist(s)	Alexandros Michail Konstantinidis	Greece	10.84	10.46	10.59	11.01	10.36	10.63	11.01	
4	Jonathan de Souza Santos	Brazil	10.60	10.60	10.59	10.64	x	10.81	10.81	
5	Zhiwei Xia	China	9.77	10.53	10.08	10.30	x	x	10.53	SB
6	Wildan Nukhailawi	Iraq	9.61	10.26	8.82	9.97	9.87	10.27	10.27	
7	Kovan Abdulraheem	Iraq	x	9.74	10.02	9.38	9.70	9.78	10.02	SB
8	Mohamed El Garaa	Morocco	9.26	9.47	x	8.65	x	8.48	9.47	
9	Denis Slunjski	Croatia	8.55	9.35	9.10				9.35	
10	Chengcheng Fan	China	8.77	9.17	9.06				9.17	
11	Ivan Bogatyrev	Russia	8.68	8.84	8.27				8.84	
12	Noureldeen Aladeely	Jordan	8.72	8.58	x				8.72	
13	Scott Danberg	United States	8.00	7.95	8.36				8.36	

Key: WR = World Record, AR = Area Record, SB = Season Best

== F42 ==
The Men's shot put, F42 was held on January 25

- F42 = single above knee amputation or equivalent impairments.

=== Results ===
==== Final ====
Rank	Athlete	Nationality	#1	#2	#3	#4	#5	#6	Result	Notes
1st place, gold medalist(s)	Maxim Narozhnyy	Russia	14.08	13.53	13.01	14.23	x	14.04	14.23	CR
2nd place, silver medalist(s)	Darko Kralj	Croatia	13.34	13.30	13.98	14.00	13.68	13.63	14.00	
DSQ	Fanie Lombaard	South Africa	x	12.88	13.06	12.88	x	13.17	~~13.17~~	SB
4	Aled Davies	Great Britain	x	12.09	11.68	12.33	12.84	12.65	12.84	
5	Frank Tinnemeier	Germany	12.73	12.63	x	x	x	x	12.73	
6	Mladen Tomic	Croatia	x	x	11.05	x	11.24	11.87	11.87	
7	Joe Flavell	New Zealand	10.62	11.01	10.47	10.93	11.01	11.17	11.17	AR
8	Heugene Murray	South Africa	10.23	x	x	x	x	10.10	10.23	

Key: CR = Championship Record, AR = Area Record, SB = Season Best

== F44/46 ==
The Men's shot put, F44/46 was held on January 28

F44/46:

- F44 = single below knee amputation or equivalent impairments.
- F46 = single above or below elbow amputation or equivalent impairments.

The Men's shot put F44/46 also include classification F43: single above knee amputation or equivalent impairments.

=== Results ===
==== Final ====
Rank	Athlete	Nationality	#1	#2	#3	#4	#5	#6	Result	Points	Notes
1st place, gold medalist(s)	Jackie Christiansen	Denmark	15.81	17.79	17.21	16.99	17.01	x	17.79	995	CR
2nd place, silver medalist(s)	Miltiadis Kyriakidis	Greece	13.10	13.64	13.35	x	13.94	14.12	14.12	747	SB
3rd place, bronze medalist(s)	Josip Slivar	Croatia	13.80	x	13.68	x	x	14.05	''14.05	740	
4	Soselito Sekeme	France	13.82	13.70	14.01	14.09	14.52	13.96	14.52	736	=CR
5	Enlong Wei	China	14.19	13.05	14.47	13.88	x	x	14.47	731	SB
6	Tomasz Rebisz	Poland	x	13.80	x	13.96	14.03	14.20	14.20	706	
7	Alexander Filatov	Russia	x	x	13.08	x	13.60	x	13.60	697	
8	Alexey Ladnyy	Russia	13.20	13.13	13.25	x	12.85	x	13.25	662	
9	Xiufeng Gong	China	13.18	x	13.32				13.32	619	
10	Zhanbiao Hou	China	12.76	x	13.18				13.18	605	
11	Maamar Meskine	Algeria	10.40	10.92	11.40				11.40	408	

Key: CR = Championship Record, =CR = Equal Championship Record, SB = Season Best

== F52/53 ==
The Men's shot put, F52/53 was held on January 24

F52/53:

- F52 = good shoulder, elbow and wrist function, poor to normal finger flexion and extension, no trunk or leg function.
- F53 = normal upper limb function, no abdominal, leg or lower spinal function.

=== Results ===
==== Final ====
Rank	Athlete	Nationality	#1	#2	#3	#4	#5	#6	Result	Points	Notes
1st place, gold medalist(s)	Aigars Apinis	Latvia	9.56	10.03	9.45				10.03	1001	WR
2nd place, silver medalist(s)	Mauro Maximo de Jesus	Mexico	7.39	8.18	8.31	8.16	8.18	8.28	8.31	931	
3rd place, bronze medalist(s)	Ales Kisy	Czech Republic	8.14	8.10	8.09	7.95	8.11	8.25	8.25	918	SB
4	Scott Severn	United States	7.81	7.87	7.87	7.56	7.66	7.72	7.87	831	
5	Che Jon Fernandes	Greece	7.59	7.57	7.66	7.65	7.07	7.60	7.66	783	
6	Gerasimos Vryonis	Greece	x	7.03	7.06	7.36	6.95	x	7.36	713	SB
7	Henrik Plank	Slovenia	7.77	x	8.02	7.97	7.91	7.94	8.02	607	
8	Georgios Karaminas	Greece	7.56	x	x	-	-	-	7.56	519	
	Dmytro Balashev	Ukraine	x	x	x					NM	

Key: WR = World Record, SB = Season Best, NM = No Mark

== F54/55/56 ==
The Men's shot put, F54/55/56 was held on January 26

F54/55/56:

- F54 = normal upper limb function, no abdominal or lower spinal function.
- F55 = normal upper limb function, may have partial to almost completely normal trunk function, no leg function.
- F56 = normal upper limb and trunk function, some leg function, high bilateral above knee amputation.

=== Results ===
==== Final ====
Rank	Athlete	Nationality	#1	#2	#3	#4	#5	#6	Result	Points	Notes
1st place, gold medalist(s)	Karol Wojciech Kozun	Poland	11.58	x	x	9.24	9.95	9.82	11.58	985	
2nd place, silver medalist(s)	Drazenko Mitrovic	Serbia	x	x	9.56	9.76	x	9.96	9.96	979	CR
3rd place, bronze medalist(s)	Ulrich Iser	Germany	10.86	11.17	10.98	10.75	11.38	10.85	11.38	974	SB
4	Martin Němec	Czech Republic	10.68	11.18	11.00	10.99	10.33	x	11.18	962	
5	Ilias Nalmpantis	Greece	10.42	10.67	11.09	10.45	11.11	11.09	11.11	958	
6	Olokhan Musayev	Azerbaijan	x	12.54	x	x	12.43	x	12.54	952	CR
7	Robin Womack	Great Britain	10.47	10.66	x	10.39	10.93	x	10.93	946	SB
8	Scott Winkler	United States	10.34	10.71	10.53	10.23	10.72	10.61	10.72	931	AR
9	Daniel Nobbs	Great Britain	8.56	8.67	9.12				9.12	914	
10	Andreas Gratt	Austria	8.80	8.22	9.06				9.06	908	
11	Krzysztof Smorszczewski	Poland	11.26	11.50	11.58				11.58	887	SB
12	Alexey Kuznetsov	Russia	8.40	8.58	8.27				8.58	859	
13	Alexey Ivanov	Russia	10.51	10.37	10.48				10.51	789	
14	Zsolt Kanyo	Hungary	7.66	7.72	x				7.72	399	

Key: CR = Championship Record, AR = Area Record, SB = Season Best

== F57/58 ==
The Men's shot put, F57/58 was held on January 24

F57/58:

- F57 = normal upper limb and trunk function, may have bilateral above knee amputations.
- F58 = normal upper limb and trunk function, a bilateral below knee amputation or single above knee amputation.

=== Results ===
==== Final ====
Rank	Athlete	Nationality	#1	#2	#3	#4	#5	#6	Result	Points	Notes
1st place, gold medalist(s)	Alexey Ashapatov	Russia	15.93	14.83	16.02	16.37	12.78	13.43	16.37	1005	WR
2nd place, silver medalist(s)	Jamil Saleh Elshebli	Jordan	13.01	13.01	12.86	13.21	13.79	x	13.79	970	CR
3rd place, bronze medalist(s)	Michael Louwrens	South Africa	x	12.62	12.90	13.34	13.73	13.60	13.73	966	AR
4	Anastasios Tsiou	Greece	13.18	x	13.72	13.23	12.21	x	13.72	965	AR
5	Boro Radenovic	Croatia	13.60	13.05	13.21	11.02	13.34	13.30	13.60	957	SB
6	Angim Dimitrios Ntomgkioni	Greece	12.91	x	13.47	12.70	x	11.24	13.47	948	SB
7	Janusz Rokicki	Poland	14.46	15.17	15.12	13.90	14.82	15.03	15.17	937	
8	Redhouane Ait Said	Algeria	x	x	12.65	12.72	13.36	13.11	13.36	804	
9	Dennis Ogbe	United States	11.80	12.38	11.90				12.38	716	
	Amer Ali Mustafa Al Abbadi	Jordan	x	x	x				NM		

Key: WR = World Record, CR = Championship Record, AR = Area Record, SB = Season Best, NM = No Mark

== See also ==
- List of IPC world records in athletics
