= Slovenia at the 1998 Winter Paralympics =

- IPC code: SLO
- NPC: Sports Federation for the Disabled of Slovenia
- Website: www.zsis.si

in Nagano
- Competitors: 1
- Medals: Gold 0 Silver 0 Bronze 0 Total 0

Winter Paralympics appearances (overview)
- 1998; 2002; 2006; 2010; 2014; 2018; 2022; 2026

Other related appearances
- Yugoslavia (1972–1988)

Slovenia competed at the 1998 Winter Paralympics in Nagano, Japan. One competitor from Slovenia won no medals and therefore did not place in the medal table.

== See also ==
- Slovenia at the Paralympics
- Slovenia at the 1998 Winter Olympics
