= Croatia at the 2002 Winter Paralympics =

- IPC code: CRO
- NPC: Croatian Paralympic Committee
- Website: www.hpo.hr

in Salt Lake City
- Competitors: 2
- Medals: Gold 0 Silver 0 Bronze 0 Total 0

Winter Paralympics appearances (overview)
- 2002; 2006; 2010; 2014; 2018; 2022; 2026

Other related appearances
- Yugoslavia (1972–1988)

Croatia competed at the 2002 Winter Paralympics in Salt Lake City, United States. 2 competitors from Croatia won no medals and so did not place in the medal table.

== See also ==
- Croatia at the Paralympics
- Croatia at the 2002 Winter Olympics
