= Slovenia at the 2014 Winter Paralympics =

- IPC code: SLO
- NPC: Sports Federation for the Disabled of Slovenia
- Website: www.zsis.si

in Sochi
- Competitors: 1 in 1 sport
- Flag bearer: Gal Jakič
- Medals: Gold 0 Silver 0 Bronze 0 Total 0

Winter Paralympics appearances (overview)
- 1998; 2002; 2006; 2010; 2014; 2018; 2022; 2026

Other related appearances
- Yugoslavia (1972–1988)

Slovenia sent a delegation to compete at the 2014 Winter Paralympics in Sochi, Russia, held between 7–16 March 2014. This was the nation's fourth appearance in the Winter Paralympic Games The Slovenian delegation consisted of a single athlete, the alpine skier Gal Jakič, who failed to finish either of his two events.

== Background ==
Slovenia first joined Paralympic competition as an independent nation in the 1992 Summer Paralympics in Barcelona, and their first Winter Paralympics appearance was at the 1998 Winter Paralympics. They have competed in every Paralympics since those respective debuts except the 2002 Winter Paralympics, and have never sent more than one athlete to a Winter Paralympics. While Slovenia had won 20 medals at the Summer Paralympics, they have never won one at the winter version. The Slovenian delegation to Sochi consisted of a single athlete, the alpine skier Gal Jakič. Jakič was the Slovenian flag-bearer for the parade of nations during the opening ceremony, and for the closing ceremony.

== Disability classification ==
Every participant at the Paralympics has their disability grouped into one of five disability categories; amputation, the condition may be congenital or sustained through injury or illness; cerebral palsy; wheelchair athletes, there is often overlap between this and other categories; visual impairment, including blindness; or Les autres. Les autres includes+ any physical disability that does not fall strictly under one of the other categories, for example dwarfism or multiple sclerosis. Each Paralympic sport then has its own classifications, dependent upon the specific physical demands of competition. Events are given a code, made of numbers and letters, describing the type of event and classification of the athletes competing. Events with "B" in the code are for athletes with visual impairment, codes LW1 to LW9 are for athletes who stand to compete and LW10 to LW12 are for athletes who compete sitting down. Alpine skiing events grouped athletes into separate competitions for sitting, standing and visually impaired athletes.

== Alpine skiing ==
Gal Jakič was 25 years old at the time of the Sochi Paralympics, and he had previously represented the nation at the 2010 Winter Paralympics. His disability comes from spinal cord injuries, and he is classified LW12-1, meaning he competes in a sitting position. On 13 March, he took part in the sitting slalom and fell roughly 30 seconds into his first run of the course. On 15 March, he completed the first run of the sitting giant slalom in a time of 1 minute and 49.66 seconds. In the second run, he fell off his ski around 25 seconds into the attempt.

Athlete	Event	Run 1			Run 2			Final/Total		
Athlete	Event	Time	Diff	Rank	Time	Diff	Rank	Time	Diff	Rank
Gal Jakič	Slalom, sitting	DNF								
Gal Jakič	Giant slalom, sitting	1:49.66	+31.56	29	DNF					

== See also ==
- Slovenia at the Paralympics
- Slovenia at the 2014 Winter Olympics
