= Slovenia at the 2006 Winter Paralympics =

- IPC code: SLO
- NPC: Sports Federation for the Disabled of Slovenia
- Website: www.zsis.si

in Turin
- Competitors: 1 in 1 sport
- Medals Ranked 20th: Gold 0 Silver 0 Bronze 0 Total 0

Winter Paralympics appearances (overview)
- 1998; 2002; 2006; 2010; 2014; 2018; 2022; 2026

Other related appearances
- Yugoslavia (1972–1988)

Slovenia participated in the ninth Winter Paralympics in Turin, Italy.

Slovenia entered one athlete in the following sport:

- Alpine skiing: 1 male

== Medalists ==
	(gold)	(silver)	(bronze)	Total
Slovenia	0	0	0	0

== See also ==
- 2006 Winter Paralympics
- Slovenia at the 2006 Winter Olympics
