= Croatia at the 2006 Winter Paralympics =

- IPC code: CRO
- NPC: Croatian Paralympic Committee
- Website: www.hpo.hr

in Turin
- Competitors: 1 in 1 sport
- Medals Ranked 20th: Gold 0 Silver 0 Bronze 0 Total 0

Winter Paralympics appearances (overview)
- 2002; 2006; 2010; 2014; 2018; 2022; 2026

Other related appearances
- Yugoslavia (1972–1988)

Croatia participated in the ninth Winter Paralympics in Turin, Italy.

Croatia entered one athlete in the following sport:

- Alpine skiing: 1 male

== Medalists ==
| | (gold) | (silver) | (bronze) | Total |
|---|---|---|---|---|
| Croatia | 0 | 0 | 0 | 0 |

== See also ==
- 2006 Winter Paralympics
- Croatia at the 2006 Winter Olympics
