= Slovenia at the 2010 Winter Paralympics =

- IPC code: SLO
- NPC: Sports Federation for the Disabled of Slovenia
- Website: www.zsis.si

in Vancouver
- Competitors: 1 in 1 sport
- Flag bearer: Gal Jakic
- Medals: Gold 0 Silver 0 Bronze 0 Total 0

Winter Paralympics appearances (overview)
- 1998; 2002; 2006; 2010; 2014; 2018; 2022; 2026

Other related appearances
- Yugoslavia (1972–1988)

Slovenia sent a delegation to compete at the 2010 Winter Paralympics, in Vancouver, British Columbia, Canada. It fielded a single athlete, in alpine skiing. It did not win a medal.

== Alpine skiing ==
The following athlete was Slovenia's sole representative in alpine skiing:

Athlete	Event	Final				
Athlete	Event	Run 1	Run 2	Total Time	Calculated Time	Rank
Gal Jakic	Men's Slalom - sitting	1:08.70	1:14.20	2:22.88		29
Gal Jakic	Men's Giant Slalom - sitting	Did not finish				

== See also ==
- Slovenia at the 2010 Winter Olympics
- Slovenia at the Paralympics
