= Ibrahim Ahmed Abdelwareth =

Egyptian track and field athlete

Personal information
- Nationality: Egyptian
- Born: 16 December 1988 (age 37)

Sport
- Country: Egypt
- Sport: Athletics
- Disability class: F44
- Events: shot put, discus
Medal record
Men's Paralympic athletics
Representing Egypt
Paralympic Games
Silver medal – second place	2012 London	Shot put F37/38
IPC World Championships
Gold medal – first place	2011 Christchurch	Shot put F37/38

Ibrahim Ahmed Abdelwareth (born 16 December 1988) is an Egyptian track and field athlete who competes in the F44 classification, mainly in throwing events. Abdelwareth represented Egypt at the 2012 Summer Paralympics in London, where he entered both the discus and shot put in the F37/F38. He finished eighth in the discus, but found success in the shot put where a throw of 15.53 gave him the silver medal. Abdelwareth has also found success at the World Championships winning gold in the 2011 IPC Athletics World Championships in Christchurch. As of 2013, Abdelwareth was reclassified as a T44 athlete, where he has found it difficult to repeat his earlier success.
