= Milka Milinković =

Croatian Paralympic athlete (1955–2017)

Personal information
- Born: 7 April 1955 Sanski Most, PR Bosnia and Herzegovina, FPR Yugoslavia
- Died: 11 June 2017 (aged 62) Rijeka, Croatia

Sport
- Country: Yugoslavia; Croatia
- Sport: Paralympic athletics
- Disability: Paraplegia
- Disability class: F55
- Event(s): Javelin throw Shot put
Medal record
Paralympic athletics
Representing Yugoslavia
Paralympic Games
Gold medal – first place	1984 Stoke Mandeville /New York	Women's javelin throw 3
Gold medal – first place	1988 Seoul	Women's shot put 4
Silver medal – second place	1972 Heidelberg	Women's 60m wheelchair 4
Silver medal – second place	1984 Stoke Mandeville /New York	Women's shot put 3
Bronze medal – third place	1972 Heidelberg	Women's javelin throw 4
Bronze medal – third place	1980 Arnhem	Women's javelin throw 4
Bronze medal – third place	1980 Arnhem	Women's shot put 4
Representing Croatia
Bronze medal – third place	1992 Barcelona	Women's javelin throw THW5

Milka Milinković (7 April 1955 – 11 June 2017) was a Croatian Paralympic athlete who mainly competed in javelin throw and shot put events. She was regarded as one of Croatia's most successful Paralympic athlete and her country's first ever medal at the 1992 Summer Paralympics after the independence of Croatia. She participated at nine Paralympic Games where she represented Yugoslavia from 1972 to 1988 and Croatia from 1992 to 2016.

In 1968, when Milinković was thirteen, she became paralysed after falling off a tree and received medical treatment and attended a rehabilitation centre in Kraljevica. Milinković died of a long illness at a hospital in Rijeka aged 62.

Milinković posthumously received the International Paralympic Committee’s High Presidential Award in 2017.
