= Antonia Balek =

Croatian Paralympic athlete

Medal record

Paralympic athletics

Representing Croatia

Paralympic Games
Gold medal – first place	2008 Beijing	Shot Put - F32–34/52–53
Gold medal – first place	2008 Beijing	Javelin throw - F33–34/52–53

Antonia Balek (born 29 May 1968 in Split) is a Paralympian athlete from Croatia competing mainly in F52 shot put and discus throw events.

She competed in the 2008 Summer Paralympics in Beijing, China. There she won a gold medal in both the women's shot put F32–34/52–53 event and F33–34/52–53 javelin throw event.
