= Krzysztof Kaczmarek (athlete) =

Polish Paralympic athlete (1978–2017)

Personal information
- Born: 18 November 1978 Zduńska Wola, Poland
- Died: 16 April 2017 (aged 38)

Sport
- Country: Poland
- Sport: Paralympic athletics
- Disability class: T20
- Event(s): Discus throw Hammer throw Shot put
Medal record
Paralympic athletics
Representing Poland
Paralympic Games
Gold medal – first place	2000 Sydney	Shot put F20
World Championships
Bronze medal – third place	2011 Christchurch	Shot put F20
INAS Global Games
Gold medal – first place	2004 Bollnas	Hammer throw
Gold medal – first place	2004 Bollnas	Shot put
Bronze medal – third place	2004 Bollnas	Discus throw
INAS World Athletics Championships
Gold medal – first place	1999 Seville	Discus throw
Gold medal – first place	1999 Seville	Shot put
Gold medal – first place	2001 Tunis	Shot put
Gold medal – first place	2003 Tunis	Shot put
Gold medal – first place	2005 Canberra	Hammer throw
Silver medal – second place	2001 Tunis	Discus throw
Silver medal – second place	2003 Tunis	Discus throw
Silver medal – second place	2003 Tunis	Hammer throw
Bronze medal – third place	2005 Canberra	Shot put
INAS European Athletics Championships
Gold medal – first place	1998 Lisbon	Discus throw
Gold medal – first place	2002 Budapest	Shot put
Gold medal – first place	2002 Budapest	Discus throw

Krzysztof Kaczmarek (18 November 1978 - 16 April 2017) was a Polish Paralympic athlete who competed at international track and field competitions. He was Paralympic champion and a World bronze medalist in shot put, he has also won multiple medals at the INAS World Athletics Championships. Kaczmarek died suddenly aged 38.
