= Athletics at the 2008 Summer Paralympics – Women's shot put F32–34/52–53 =

The Women's Shot Put F33-34/52/53 had its Final held on September 15 at 9:10.

== Medalists ==
Gold	Antonia Balek; Croatia
Silver	Birgit Pohl; Germany
Bronze	Maria Stamatoula; Greece

== Results ==
Place	Athlete	Class	1	2	3	4	5	6	Best	Points
1	Antonia Balek (CRO)	F52	5.69	4.69	4.97	-	-	-	5.69 WR	1240
2	Birgit Pohl (GER)	F34	8.07	8.46	8.29	7.96	8.20	7.93	8.46	1122
3	Maria Stamatoula (GRE)	F32	5.50	5.54	5.58	5.64	5.30	5.50	5.64 PR	1109
4	Tetyana Yakybchuk (UKR)	F33	6.18	6.48	6.46	6.20	6.33	5.99	6.48 PR	1020
5	Brydee Moore (AUS)	F33	6.19	5.75	6.27	6.01	6.38	5.71	6.38	1005
6	Louise Ellery (AUS)	F32	4.74	5.07	4.97	4.94	4.72	4.95	5.07	997
7	Gemma Prescott (GBR)	F32	4.65	4.77	4.75	4.51	3.85	4.46	4.77	938
8	Elena Burdykina (RUS)	F34	7.05	7.02	6.79	6.64	6.67	6.70	7.05	935
9	Maha Alsheraian (KUW)	F32	4.67	x	4.26				4.67	918
10	Frances Herrmann (GBR)	F34	6.90	6.80	x				6.90	915
11	Jessica Hamill (NZL)	F34	6.77	6.60	6.64				6.77	898
12	Ouassila Oussadit (ALG)	F32	4.26	4.54	4.29				4.54	893
13	Robyn Stawski (USA)	F33	5.56	5.36	5.36				5.56	876
14	Yousra Ben Jemaa (TUN)	F34	6.43	6.52	6.37				6.52	864
15	Louadjeda Benoumessad (ALG)	F34	5.74	6.33	6.36				6.36	843
16	Aroua Bidani (TUN)	F32	3.74	4.08	4.03				4.08	802
17	A Triantafyllidou (GRE)	F34	5.85	5.81	5.92				5.92	785
