= Athletics at the 2008 Summer Paralympics – Men's shot put F42 =

The Men's Shot Put F42 had its Final held on September 10 at 17:30.

== Medalists ==
Gold	Darko Kralj; Croatia
Silver	Maxim Narozhnyy; Russia
Bronze	Fanie Lombard; South Africa

== Results ==
Place	Athlete	1	2	3	4	5	6	Best
1	Darko Kralj (CRO)	14.10	14.12	14.23	14.32	14.43	14.01	14.43 WR
2	Maxim Narozhnyy (RUS)	13.10	13.92	13.23	12.73	13.22	12.88	13.92
3	Fanie Lombard (RSA)	x	13.25	12.79	13.63	13.53	13.87	13.87
4	Wang Lezheng (CHN)	12.49	12.50	13.18	13.63	11.75	13.04	13.63
5	Mehrdad Karamzadeh (IRI)	13.49	x	13.39	12.95	13.28	13.58	13.58
6	Mladen Tomic (CRO)	12.27	11.54	12.53	12.78	12.29	12.14	12.78
7	Mahdi Asghari (IRI)	12.50	x	x	x	x	12.15	12.50
8	Matt Brown (USA)	x	12.46	11.93	12.13	12.22	12.17	12.46
9	Leszek Cmikiewicz (POL)	12.13	11.80	11.87				12.13
10	Viktar Khilmonchyk (BLR)	11.53	x	11.68				11.68
11	Athanasios Deligiorgis (GRE)	x	x	11.68				11.68
12	Gino de Keermaeker (BEL)	11.09	11.53	11.22				11.53
13	Frank Tinnemeier (GER)	x	11.47	11.28				11.47
