= Maxim Narozhnyy =

Russian Paralympic athlete

Medal record

Paralympic athletics

Representing Russia

Paralympic Games
Silver medal – second place	2008 Beijing	Shot put - F42

Maxim Narozhnyy (1975–2011) was a Russian paralympian athlete who competed mainly in category F42 shot put events.

He competed in the 2008 Summer Paralympics in Beijing, China. There he won a silver medal in the men's F42 shot put event.
