= Miroslav Jančić =

Bosnian and Herzegovinian writer and diplomat

Miroslav Jančić (born 1935 in Sarajevo, died 2004 in Sarajevo) was a Bosnian and Herzegovinian playwright, novelist, poet, politician and diplomat. He was the recipient of the Sixth of April Sarajevo Award.

== Career ==
Jancic's diverse career started as a journalist in the 1960s for the former Yugoslav daily newspaper Oslobođenje. In the 1970s he became the director of drama of the Sarajevo National Theatre, and the director of the Museum of Literature and Theater Arts of Bosnia and Herzegovina. In the 1980s Jancic was appointed the deputy mayor of Sarajevo, a member of the National Parliament of Bosnia and Herzegovina within former Yugoslavia, and a member of the organizing committee of the 1984 Winter Olympics. He was awarded the Sarajevo City's highest medal (Sixth of April Sarajevo Award) in 1980, in recognition of his work and achievements.

Jancic's published and performed corpus includes fourteen theatre plays, six novels, three screenplays, a libretto, three collections of poetry, and other works, originally written either in the English or Serbo-Croatian languages. The Croatian Encyclopedia references Jancic among the most prominent playwrights of Bosnia and Herzegovina, where his plays were widely performed. His literary works have been translated into Slovenian, Russian, Polish and Czech.

Jancic's play Bundžija was awarded the Best Drama Text of the Contemporary Bosnian-Herzegovinian Writer in 1977.

Jancic's novel “Tvrtko” (1979) and the theatre drama “The Bosnian King” (“Bosanski kralj”, 1974) were both the first novel and the first play to be written about the life of the medieval Bosnian king Tvrtko I of Bosnia.

During the 1980s he contributed short-stories to the popular children's magazine Vesela sveska.

At the start of the disintegration of former Yugoslavia, Jancic served as the country's last ambassador to Ghana, following which he published the non-fiction work The Last Ambassador (Posljednji ambasador) in 1997. While he served as the spokesperson for the wartime foreign ministry of Bosnia and Herzegovina, in 1993 he wrote the non-fiction novel Sarajevo 92/93: By the Spokesman from Hell.

Later, as a refugee in the United Kingdom, Jancic said that he suffered “an attack of poetry”, following which he published three poetry collections.

In the year before his death, Jancic translated Adrian Hastings’ Construction of Nationhood into the Bosnian language

== Legacy ==
Jancic is credited as “the originator of the drama circle with a historical theme” in Bosnia and Herzegovina, and as a “drama chronicler of the history of Bosnia and Herzegovina”. His play Bas-bascarsija was described as having “psychologically precisely dissected the most important problem that Bosnia has always been exposed to and that all his playwriting is based on…the problem of inter-ethnic (inter-religious) hatred, which persistently leads to the denial of a common, Bosnian identity” . Jancic's drama texts have been studied as “a medium of cultural memory”. Gradimir Gojer placed Jancic among “the most esteemed theatre and cultural workers of an entire epoch in Bosnian-Herzegovinian culture”.

His broader cultural legacy was celebrated as part of the XXXVII Meetings of Theatre of Bosnia and Herzegovina in 2020, where his award-winning drama Bundžija was included in the Anthology of South Slavic drama of the Meetings of Theatre of Bosnia and Herzegovina

Jančič’s original manuscripts are held by the Museum of Literature and Theater Arts of Bosnia and Herzegovina.

== Selected works ==
=== Novels ===
- Tvrtko (Publisher: Svjetlost, Sarajevo:1979)
- Crni sine (The Prodigal Son) (Publisher: Svjetlost, OOUR Izdavačka djelatnost, Sarajevo: 1983)
- Svitac (Lightning Bug) (Publisher: NIŠRO “Oslobodjenje”, OOUR Izdavačka djelatnost, Sarajevo: 1986)
- Kako sam izdao nacionalnu stvar (How I Betrayed the National Cause) (Publisher: NIŠRO Oslobodjenje, OOUR Izdavačka djelatnost, Sarajevo: 1982)
- Posljednji ambasador (The Last Ambassador) (Publisher: Rabic, Sarajevo: 1997)
- Sarajevo 92/93: izvještava portparol pakla (Sarajevo 92/93: by the Spokesman from Hell) (Publisher: ZP Enotnost, Ljubljana, 1994)
- Glasnik pekla. Umreti sa Sarajevom (ČZP Enotnost, Ljubljana: 1993)
- Glasnik pekla II. Umreti bez Sarajeva (ČZP Enotnost, Ljubljana: 1993)

=== Poetry collections ===
- The Flying Bosnian: Poems from Limbo (Publisher: Hearing Eye, London: 1996)
- Singling Through the Town (Publisher: Hearing Eye, London: 2001)
- Home Bloody Home/Dome prokleti dome (Publisher: Hearing Eye, in cooperation with BRICKS, London: 2005)
- Bosanac vanzemaljac (Bosnian - Alien) (Publisher: Medjunarodni centar za mir: 1999. Biblioteka Harfa)

=== Plays ===
- Bosanski kralj (The Bosnian King), (Publisher: Svjetlost, Sarajevo: 1974)
- Kolo (Dance) (Published in Drame. Svjetlost, Sarajevo:1985)
- Ko živ, ko mrtav (Whoever Survives)
- Bundžija (Rebel) (Publisher: Biblioteka “Prva izvodjenja” DRUGO KOLO, Sarajevo: 1977).
- Sudnji dan i noć (Judgement Day and Night)
- Grešni Herceg (Sinful Herzeg) (1975)
- Dva scenska portreta (Two Stage Portraits) (Publisher: Biblioteka “Prva izvodjenja” - DESETO KOLO (43), Sarajevo: 1989)
- Kumova slama (Milky Way) (Publisher: Zajednica profesionalnih pozorišta Bosne i Hercegovine, Sarajevo: 1981)
- Bas-bascarsija (1970)
- Bezakonik (Infidel)
- Krajem prošlog stoljeća (At the End of the Last Century)
- Sarajevski atentat (The Sarajevo Assassination)
- Bosanska kuga (Pestilenza bosignana) (Literary Magazine “Zivot”, 1966)
- Perpetuum mobile
- The Dog Walker (1997)

=== Screenplays ===
- Pismo, glava (Heads or Tails), 1983
- Ukazanje Gospe u selu Grabovica (The Virgin's Appearance in Village Grabovica), 1985
- Sarajevo – drugaciji grad (Sarajevo, a Different City), 1980

=== Libretto ===
- Satana, 1972

=== Short stories ===
- Bosnia in Britain/Bosna izvan sebe (Publisher: Bosnian Institute and BRICKS, London: 2004)
- Stories published in Vesela sveska
