= Swimming at the 2004 Summer Paralympics – Men's 100 metre backstroke S8 =

Men's 100m Backstroke S8 at the XII Paralympic Games
- Paralympic Swimming
- Venue: Olympic Aquatic Centre
- Dates: 22 September 2004
- Competitors: 11 from 10 nations
- Winning time: 1:10.15

Medalists
1st place, gold medalist(s)		Travis Mohr	United States
2nd place, silver medalist(s)		David Malone	Ireland
3rd place, bronze medalist(s)		Mihovil Spanja	Croatia

The Men's 100 metre backstroke S8 swimming event at the 2004 Summer Paralympics was competed on 22 September. It was won by Travis Mohr, representing United States.

== 1st round ==
Qualified for next round

Heat 1

22 Sept. 2004, morning session

Rank	Athlete	Time	Notes
1	Travis Mohr (USA)	1:13.12	
2	Christopher Kueken (GER)	1:16.48	
3	Gert-Jan Schep (NED)	1:17.64	
4	Liu Jing Yan (CHN)	1:19.90	
5	Matt Levy (AUS)	1:22.49	

Heat 2

22 Sept. 2004, morning session

Rank	Athlete	Time	Notes
1	Wang Xiao Fu (CHN)	1:12.30	
2	David Malone (IRL)	1:13.64	
3	Mihovil Spanja (CRO)	1:14.08	
4	Gledson Soares (BRA)	1:18.92	
5	Tiaan du Plessis (RSA)	1:19.55	
6	Ali Uzun (TUR)	1:22.53	

== Final round ==
22 Sept. 2004, evening session

Rank	Athlete	Time	Notes
1st place, gold medalist(s)	Travis Mohr (USA)	1:10.15	
2nd place, silver medalist(s)	David Malone (IRL)	1:12.55	
3rd place, bronze medalist(s)	Mihovil Spanja (CRO)	1:13.49	
4	Wang Xiao Fu (CHN)	1:14.88	
5	Christopher Kueken (GER)	1:15.89	
6	Gert-Jan Schep (NED)	1:17.74	
7	Gledson Soares (BRA)	1:18.44	
8	Tiaan du Plessis (RSA)	1:19.67	
