= Darko Kralj =

Croatian Paralympic shot putter

Personal information
- Born: 6 June 1971 (age 55) Garešnica, SR Croatia, SFR Yugoslavia

Sport
- Country: Croatia
- Sport: Paralympic athletics
- Event: Shot put
- Coached by: Ivan Ivančić
Medal record
Representing Croatia
Track and field
Paralympic Games
Gold medal – first place	2008 Beijing	Shot put – F42
Silver medal – second place	2012 London	Shot put – F42–44
IPC Athletics World Championships
Silver medal – second place	2011 Christchurch	Shot put – F42
IWAS World Games
Gold medal – first place	2009 Bangalore	Shot put – F42
Gold medal – first place	2011 Sharjah	Shot put – F42

Darko Kralj (born 6 June 1971) is a Croatian Paralympic athlete competing mainly in shot put events. He lost his left leg in a missile attack in 1991.

At the 2008 Summer Paralympics in Beijing, he won a gold medal in the men's F42 shot put event improving his world record with 14.43 metres. At the 2011 IPC Athletics World Championships held in Christchurch, Kralj won a silver medal.

The King, a Croatian-language film about Kralj's life directed by Dejan Aćimović, was released in 2012.
