= Bruno Bošnjak =

Croatian Paralympic snowboarder

Personal information
- Born: 9 July 1983 (age 42) Zagreb, SR Croatia, SFR Yugoslavia

Sport
- Sport: Snowboarding
- Disability class: SB-LL1
Medal record
Men's para snowboarding
Representing Croatia
Winter Paralympic Games
Bronze medal – third place	2018 Pyeongchang	Banked slalom SB-LL1

Bruno Bošnjak (born 9 July 1983) is a snowboarder who became Croatia's first medalist at any Winter Paralympics. Later Dino Sokolović won gold for their country. His disability came from an injury during a qualifying race for the 2006 Winter Olympics and exacerbated by a later bicycle injury.
