= Filip Radović =

Montenegrin para table tennis player

Personal information
- Born: 8 July 2000 (age 26) Cetinje, Montenegro

Sport
- Sport: Table tennis
- Disability class: 10
Medal record
Para table tennis
Representing Montenegro
Paralympic Games
| Bronze medal – third place | 2020 Tokyo | Singles C10 |
| Bronze medal – third place | 2024 Paris | Singles C10 |
Games of the Small States of Europe
| Bronze medal – third place | 2019 Tivat | Men's singles |

Filip Radović (born 8 July 2000) is a Montenegrin para table tennis player. He won Montenegro's first-ever Paralympic medal, a bronze, at the 2020 Summer Paralympics, and later won another bronze medal at the 2024 Summer Paralympics.
