= Marijana Goranović =

Montenegrin shot putter (born 1989)

Personal information
- Nationality: Montenegro
- Born: 3 January 1989 (age 37) Nikšić

Sport
- Country: Montenegro
- Sport: Paralympic athletics F40
- Event: Women's shot put F40
- Coached by: Igor Tomic
Medal record
Paralympic athletics
Representing Montenegro
IPC European Championships
Silver medal – second place	2016 Grosseto	Shot put - F40/41

Marijana Goranović (born 3 January 1989) is a Montenegrin Paralympic shot putter. She competed for Montenegro at the 2012 Summer Paralympics, the only athlete for her country. She also competed in the 2016 and 2020 Summer Paralympics in F41 shot put and discus throw.

She worked in 2012 with UNICEF and then UN Secretary Ban Ki-moon to air a commercial in Montenegro promoting sport for children with disabilities.
