= Jernej Slivnik =

Slovenian para-alpine skier

Personal information
- Born: 26 November 2000 (age 25)

Sport
- Sport: Paralympic skiing
Medal record
Men's para-alpine skiing
Representing Slovenia
World University Games
Gold medal – first place	2025 Turin	Giant slalom sitting
Silver medal – second place	2025 Turin	Super-G sitting

Jernej Slivnik (born 26 November 2000) is a Slovenian paralympic skier from Hrušica.

Slivnik was involved in a car crash in 2006 where he sustained a spinal cord injury; his father and sister were killed in the accident. In 2009, he was introduced to Para skiing. He started competing in 2015 and represented Slovenia as the sole participant at the 2018 and 2022 Winter Paralympics. He competed in slalom and giant slalom in the sitting category; his best result was in slalom in 2018 where he finished 12th.

Slivnik lives in Hrušica and is friends with ice hockey player Anže Kopitar who also comes from that town.
