= Zlatko Kesler =

Serbian Paralympic table tennis player

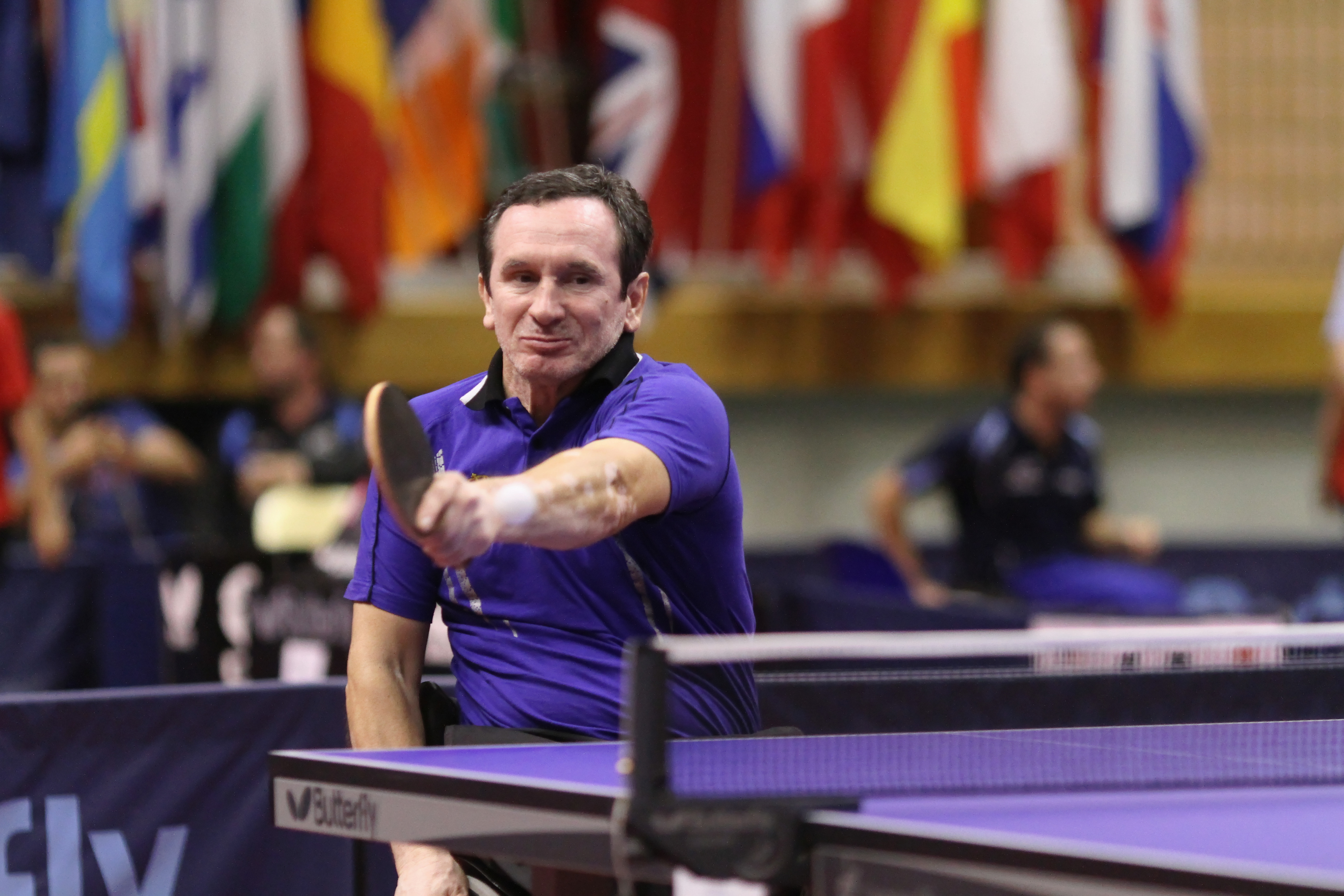

Medal record

Men's table tennis

Paralympic Games

Competed as an independent participant
| Bronze medal – third place | 1992 Barcelona | Individual - Class 3 |

Representing Yugoslavia/Serbia and Montenegro/Serbia
| Gold medal – first place | 1996 Atlanta | Individual - Class 3 |
| Silver medal – second place | 2012 London | Individual - Class 3 |
| Silver medal – second place | 2000 Sydney | Individual - Class 3 |
| Bronze medal – third place | 2004 Athens | Individual - Class 3 |

World Para Table Tennis Championships
| Gold medal – first place | 2006 Montreux | Singles class 3 |
| Silver medal – second place | 2002 Taipei | Singles class 3 |
| Bronze medal – third place | 2010 Gwangju | Singles class 3 |
| Bronze medal – third place | 1998 Paris | Singles class 3 |
| Bronze medal – third place | 2010 Paris | Teams class 5 |

Zlatko Kesler (Serbian Cyrillic: Златко Кеслер, born 17 March 1960 in Selenča) is a Serbian disabled table tennis player.

He has won five medals at Paralympic Games and was the Serbian flag bearer at the 2008 Summer Paralympics held in Beijing, China.
