= Montenegro at the Paralympics =

- IPC code: MNE
- NPC: Paralympic Committee of Montenegro
- Website: www.pokcg.org
- Medals: Gold 0 Silver 0 Bronze 2 Total 2

Summer appearances
- 2008; 2012; 2016; 2020; 2024

Other related appearances
- Yugoslavia (1972–2000); Independent Paralympic Participants (1992); Serbia and Montenegro (2004)

Montenegro made its Paralympic Games debut at the 2008 Summer Paralympics in Beijing, following its split with Serbia. It had previously competed as part of Serbia and Montenegro in 2004; and as part of Yugoslavia before that.

Montenegro's delegation to the 2008 Summer Paralympics consisted in a single athlete, Dušan Dragović, who competed in swimming and did not win a medal. Montenegro will make its Winter Paralympics debut at the 2026 Winter Paralympics in Milan and Cortina d'Ampezzo with a single competitor in para snowboard. Before that, it had never participated in the Winter Paralympic Games. Montenegro was represented by 1 athlete in 2012 and 2 in 2016.

At the Tokyo 2020 Paralympic Games, Montenegrin’s sole representative Filip Radović won bronze in men's table tennis, the first medal in Montenegrin Paralympic history.

== Full results for Montenegro at the Paralympics ==
Name	Games	Sport	Event	Rank
Dušan Dragović	2008 Beijing	Swimming	Men's 50 metre freestyle S10	15
Marijana Goranović	2012 London	Athletics	Women's shot put F40	7
Marijana Goranović	2016 Rio	Athletics	Shot Put F41	8
Marijana Goranović	2016 Rio	Athletics	Discus F40-41	9
Ilija Tadić	2016 Rio	Swimming	50 m freestyle S9	14
Ilija Tadić	2016 Rio	Swimming	100 m freestyle S9	17
Filip Radović	2020 Tokyo	Table Tennis	Men's individual Class 10	Bronze

== See also ==
- Montenegro at the Olympics
