= Paralympic Committee of Montenegro =

National Paralympic Committee of Montenegro

National Paralympic Committee
- Country: Montenegro
- Code: MNE
- Created: 2007
- Continental association: EPC
- Headquarters: Podgorica, Montenegro
- President: Igor Tomić
- Secretary General: Dušan Dragović
- Website: www.pokcg.org

The Paralympic Committee of Montenegro (Montenegrin: Параолимпијски комитет Црне Горе / Paraolimpijski komitet Crne Gore) is the National Paralympic Committee in Montenegro for the Paralympic Games movement. It is a non-profit organisation that selects teams, and raises funds to send Montenegrin competitors to Paralympic events organised by the International Paralympic Committee (IPC).

== History ==
The Paralympic Committee of Montenegro was founded in May 2007. by renaming the Association for Sports and Recreation of the Disabled of Montenegro.

== See also ==
- Montenegro at the Paralympics
