= Dino Sokolović =

Croatian para-alpine skier (born 1988)

Personal information
- Born: 17 December 1988 (age 37) Zagreb, SR Croatia, SFR Yugoslavia
Medal record
Men's para-alpine skiing
Representing Croatia
Winter Paralympics
Gold medal – first place	2018 Pyeongchang	Slalom, sitting

Dino Sokolović (born 17 December 1988) is a Croatian alpine skier who won Croatia its first gold at any Winter Paralympics. He competed at the four Winter Paralympics: 2010 in Vancouver, 2014 in Sochi, 2018 in PyeongChang and 2026 in Milano-Cortina.

He debuted at the 2010 Vancouver Paralympics in slalom, finishing 21st. At the 2014 Paralympics in Sochi, he finished 12th in the same discipline. At the 2018 Paralympics in Pyeongchang, Sokolović competed in five disciplines: combination (finishing 9th), grand slalom (15th), downhill (17th), super-G (19th) and slalom, in which he won gold medal.
