= Croatia at the Paralympics =

- IPC code: CRO
- NPC: Croatian Paralympic Committee
- Website: www.hpo.hr
- Medals: Gold 7 Silver 9 Bronze 16 Total 32

Summer appearances
- 1992; 1996; 2000; 2004; 2008; 2012; 2016; 2020; 2024

Winter appearances
- 2002; 2006; 2010; 2014; 2018; 2022; 2026

Other related appearances
- Yugoslavia (1972–2000)

Croatia, following its independence, made its Paralympic Games début at the 1992 Summer Paralympics in Barcelona, sending three competitors in swimming, two in shooting and one in track and field. The latter, Milka Milinković, won Croatia's first Paralympic medal, and its only medal of the 1992 Games - a bronze in the women's javelin (THW5 category).

Croatia has taken part in every subsequent edition of the Summer Paralympics. It first participated in the Winter Paralympics in 2002, with two representatives in alpine skiing, and has entered every edition of the Winter Games since then.

Croatians have won a total of thirty-two Paralympic medals, of which seven gold, nine silver and sixteen bronze. Thirty of these medals have been won at the Summer Games, in track and field, swimming, table tennis and taekwondo. And with the exception of Milinković's early bronze, all have been won from 2004 games onwards. At the Winter Games Croatia has won two medals, gold in alpine skiing and bronze in snowboarding.

== Medal tables ==
=== Medals by Summer Games ===
Games	Athletes	Gold	Silver	Bronze	Total	Rank
(Spain) 1992 Barcelona	6	0	0	1	1	50
(United States) 1996 Atlanta	5	0	0	0	0	–
(Australia) 2000 Sydney	15	0	0	0	0	–
(Greece) 2004 Athens	17	0	0	4	4	70
(China) 2008 Beijing	25	3	1	0	4	37
(United Kingdom) 2012 London	25	0	2	3	5	58
(Brazil) 2016 Rio de Janeiro	19	2	2	1	5	41
(Japan) 2020 Tokyo	22	0	3	4	7	65
(France) 2024 Paris	22	1	1	2	4	59
Total		6	9	15	30	65

=== Medals by Winter Games ===
Games	Athletes	Gold	Silver	Bronze	Total	Rank
(United States) 2002 Salt Lake City	2	0	0	0	0	–
(Italy) 2006 Turin	1	0	0	0	0	–
(Canada) 2010 Vancouver	4	0	0	0	0	–
(Russia) 2014 Sochi	2	0	0	0	0	–
(South Korea) 2018 Pyeongchang	7	1	0	1	2	18
(China) 2022 Beijing	4	0	0	0	0	–
(Italy) 2026 Milano-Cortina	5	0	0	0	0	–
Total		1	0	1	2	27

=== Medals by summer sport ===
Sport	Gold	Silver	Bronze	Total
Athletics	4	7	8	19
Table tennis	2	1	1	4
Taekwondo	0	1	0	1
Swimming	0	0	6	6
Totals (4 entries)	6	9	15	30

=== Medals by winter sport ===
Sport	Gold	Silver	Bronze	Total
Alpine skiing	1	0	0	1
Snowboarding	0	0	1	1
Totals (2 entries)	1	0	1	2

== List of medalists ==
=== Summer sports ===
Medal	Name(s)	Games	Sport	Event	Date
Bronze	Milka Milinković	(Spain) 1992 Barcelona	Athletics	Women's javelin throw THW5	September 1992
Bronze	Mihovil Španja	(Greece) 2004 Athens	Swimming	Men's 100 m backstroke S8	22 September 2004
Bronze	Mihovil Španja	(Greece) 2004 Athens	Swimming	Men's 200 m individual medley SM8	23 September 2004
Bronze	Mihovil Španja	(Greece) 2004 Athens	Swimming	Men's 400 m freestyle S8	24 September 2004
Bronze	Jelena Vuković	(Greece) 2004 Athens	Athletics	Women's discus throw F42–46	25 September 2004
Gold	Antonia Balek	(China) 2008 Beijing	Athletics	Women's javelin throw F33–34/52–53	13 September 2008
Gold	Antonia Balek	(China) 2008 Beijing	Athletics	Women's shot put F32–34/52–53	15 September 2008
Gold	Darko Kralj	(China) 2008 Beijing	Athletics	Men's shot put F42	10 September 2008
Silver	Branimir Budetić	(China) 2008 Beijing	Athletics	Men's javelin throw F11–12	10 September 2008
Silver	Darko Kralj	(United Kingdom) 2012 London	Athletics	Men's shot put F42–44	31 August 2012
Silver	Zoran Talić	(United Kingdom) 2012 London	Athletics	Men's long jump F20	4 September 2012
Bronze	Branimir Budetić	(United Kingdom) 2012 London	Athletics	Men's javelin throw F12–13	5 September 2012
Bronze	Mikela Ristoski	(United Kingdom) 2012 London	Athletics	Women's long jump F20	3 September 2012
Bronze	Mihovil Španja	(United Kingdom) 2012 London	Swimming	Men's 100 m backstroke S7	30 August 2012
Gold	Sandra Paović	(Brazil) 2016 Rio de Janeiro	Table tennis	Women's individual C6	12 September 2016
Gold	Mikela Ristoski	(Brazil) 2016 Rio de Janeiro	Athletics	Women's long jump F20	15 September 2016
Silver	Zoran Talić	(Brazil) 2016 Rio de Janeiro	Athletics	Men's long jump F20	11 September 2016
Silver	Anđela Mužinić and Helena Dretar Karić	(Brazil) 2016 Rio de Janeiro	Table tennis	Women's team C1–3	16 September 2016
Bronze	Velimir Šandor	(Brazil) 2016 Rio de Janeiro	Athletics	Men's discus throw F52	8 September 2016
Silver	Velimir Šandor	(Japan) 2020 Tokyo	Athletics	Men's discus throw F52	29 August 2021
Silver	Ivan Katanušić	(Japan) 2020 Tokyo	Athletics	Men's discus throw F64	2 September 2021
Silver	Ivan Mikulić	(Japan) 2020 Tokyo	Taekwondo	Men's +75 kg	4 September 2021
Bronze	Anđela Mužinić and Helena Dretar Karić	(Japan) 2020 Tokyo	Table tennis	Women's team C1–3	1 September 2021
Bronze	Mikela Ristoski	(Japan) 2020 Tokyo	Athletics	Women's long jump F20	3 September 2021
Bronze	Dino Sinovčić	(Japan) 2020 Tokyo	Swimming	Men's 100 m backstroke S6	3 September 2021
Bronze	Deni Černi	(Japan) 2020 Tokyo	Athletics	Men's shot put F33	4 September 2021
Bronze	Luka Baković	(France) 2024 Paris	Athletics	Men's shot put F46	4 September 2024
Gold	Anđela Mužinić	(France) 2024 Paris	Table tennis	Women's individual C3	6 September 2024
Bronze	Dino Sinovčić	(France) 2024 Paris	Swimming	Men's 100 m backstroke S6	7 September 2024
Silver	Deni Černi	(France) 2024 Paris	Athletics	Men's shot put F33	7 September 2024

=== Winter sports ===
Medal	Name(s)	Games	Sport	Event	Date
Gold	Dino Sokolović	(South Korea) 2018 Pyeongchang	Alpine skiing	Men's slalom sitting	17 March 2018
Bronze	Bruno Bošnjak	(South Korea) 2018 Pyeongchang	Snowboarding	Men's banked slalom SB-LL2	16 March 2018

== List of flag bearers ==
No.	Event year	Season	Flag bearer	Sport
1	1992 Barcelona	Summer		
2	1996 Atlanta	Summer		
3	2000 Sydney	Summer		
4	2002 Salt Lake City	Winter		
5	2004 Athens	Summer	Mihovil Španja	Swimming
6	2006 Turin	Winter	Zlatko Pesjak	Alpine skiing
7	2008 Beijing	Summer	Marija Iveković	Athletics
8	2010 Vancouver	Winter	Mario Dadić	Alpine skiing
9	2012 London	Summer	Darko Kralj	Athletics
10	2014 Sochi	Winter	Dino Sokolović	Alpine skiing
11	2016 Rio de Janeiro	Summer	Branimir Budetić	Athletics
12	2018 Pyeongchang	Winter	Eva Goluža	Alpine skiing
13	2020 Tokyo	Summer	Mikela Ristoski	Athletics
14	2022 Beijing	Winter	Bruno Bošnjak	Snowboarding
15	2024 Paris	Summer	Anđela Mužinić and Dino Sinovčić	Table tennis and Swimming

== Multiple medal winners ==
The following list only contains medal winners for Croatia as an independent country.

Athlete	Sex	Sport	Years	Games	Gold	Silver	Bronze	Total
Antonia Balek	F	Athletics	2008	Summer	2	0	0	2
Anđela Mužinić	F	Table tennis	2016–2024	Summer	1	1	1	3
Darko Kralj	M	Athletics	2008–2012	Summer	1	1	0	2
Mikela Ristoski	F	Athletics	2012–2020	Summer	1	0	2	3
Zoran Talić	M	Athletics	2012–2016	Summer	0	2	0	2
Branimir Budetić	M	Athletics	2008–2012	Summer	0	1	1	2
Helena Dretar Karić	F	Table tennis	2016–2020	Summer	0	1	1	2
Velimir Šandor	M	Athletics	2016–2020	Summer	0	1	1	2
Deni Černi	M	Athletics	2020–2024	Summer	0	1	1	2
Mihovil Španja	M	Swimming	2004–2012	Summer	0	0	4	4
Dino Sinovčić	M	Swimming	2020–2024	Summer	0	0	2	2

== See also ==
- Croatia at the Olympics
