= Serbia and Montenegro at the 2004 Summer Paralympics =

- IPC code: SCG
- NPC: Paralympic Committee of Serbia and Montenegro

in Athens
- Competitors: 5 in 3 sports
- Medals Ranked 71st: Gold 0 Silver 0 Bronze 2 Total 2

Summer Paralympics appearances (overview)
- 2004

Other related appearances
- Yugoslavia (1972–2000); Independent Paralympic Participants (1992); Serbia (2008–pres.); Montenegro (2008–pres.)

The Union of Serbia and Montenegro only competed at the Paralympic Games under that name at the 2004 Summer Paralympics in Athens. In 1992, its athletes competed as Independent Paralympic Participants. From 1996 to 2000, included, it was officially known as the Federal Republic of Yugoslavia. The International Paralympic Committee lists the country as "Yugoslavia" up to 2000, included, and considers that "Serbia and Montenegro" participated only in 2004. In 2006, the Union split into two sovereign countries, henceforth competing separately as Serbia and Montenegro.

Going by the IPC's records, Serbia and Montenegro won two bronze medals during its sole Paralympics participation, in 2004. However, Serbian and Montenegrin (Yugoslav) athletes won two gold medals and two silver in 1996, and a single silver medal in 2000, while the Independent Paralympic Participants won four gold, three silver and a bronze in 1992.

Serbia and Montenegro has never competed at the 2006 Winter Paralympics in Turin.

== Medalists ==
Medal	Name	Sport	Event
Bronze	Milos Grlica	Athletics	Men's Javelin F12
Bronze	Zlatko Kesler	Table Tennis	Men's singles – Class 3

== Sports ==
=== Athletics ===
==== Men's track ====
Athlete	Class	Event	Heats		Semifinal		Final	
Athlete	Class	Event	Result	Rank	Result	Rank	Result	Rank
Zeljko Celikovic	T46	1500m	—N/a				4:22.02	13
Zeljko Celikovic	T46	5000m	—N/a				16:25.72	16

==== Men's field ====
Athlete	Class	Event	Final		
Athlete	Class	Event	Result	Points	Rank
Miloš Grlica	F12	Javelin	52.05	-	3rd place, bronze medalist(s)

=== Table tennis ===
Athlete	Event	Preliminaries				Round of 16	Quarterfinals	Semifinals	Final / BM	
Athlete	Event	Opposition Result	Opposition Result	Opposition Result	Rank	Opposition Result	Opposition Result	Opposition Result	Opposition Result	Rank
Ilija Djurasinovic	Men's singles 5	Kim B Y (KOR); L 0-3	Pazaran (MEX); W 3-0	Hoegstedt (SWE); W 3-2	2 Q	Jung E C (KOR); L 0-3	did not advance			
Zlatko Kesler	Men's singles 3	Kramminger (AUT); W 3–1	Glazar (CZE); W 3–2	Siachos (GRE); W 3–0	1 Q	—N/a	Robinson (GBR); W 3–0	Robin (FRA); L 1-3	Piñas (ESP); W 3-0	3rd place, bronze medalist(s)

== See also ==
- Serbia and Montenegro at the Paralympics
- Serbia and Montenegro at the 2004 Summer Olympics
