= Independent Paralympic Participants at the 1992 Summer Paralympics =

- Former logo of the Paralympics (1988-1994).
- IPC code: IPP

in Barcelona
- Competitors: 16 in 4 sports
- Flag bearer: None
- Medals Ranked 26th: Gold 4 Silver 3 Bronze 1 Total 8

Summer Paralympics appearances (overview)
- 1992; 1996; 2000; 2004–2012; 2016; 2020; 2024

Other related appearances
- Yugoslavia (1972–2000); Serbia and Montenegro (2004); Serbia (2008–pres.); Montenegro (2008–pres.)

Independent Paralympic participants were athletes from the Federal Republic of Yugoslavia at the 1992 Summer Paralympics in Barcelona. Athletes from the parts of Yugoslavia still terming themselves "Yugoslavia" had competed as "independent Olympic participants" at the 1992 Summer Olympics, also hosted by Barcelona. They were not permitted to participate as "Yugoslavia", due to United Nations Security Council Resolution 757 placing sanctions on the country. The International Paralympic Committee thus recognises Yugoslavia's participation in the Paralympics from 1972 to 1988 and from 1996 to 2000 inclusive, but not in 1992, where its athletes officially belonged to no national delegation.

There were sixteen "independent Paralympic participants" at the 1992 Games, competing in athletics, shooting, swimming and table tennis. They won a total of eight medals, of which four gold.

== Medallists ==
Medal	Name	Games	Sport	Event
Gold	Nada Vuksanovic	1992 Barcelona	Athletics	Women's discus B2
Gold	Ruzica Aleksov	1992 Barcelona	Shooting	Mixed air pistol SH1>3
Gold	Branimir Jovanovski	1992 Barcelona	Shooting	Mixed air pistol SH1
Gold	Nenad Krisanovic	1992 Barcelona	Swimming	Men's 50 m breaststroke SB2
Silver	Nada Vuksanovic	1992 Barcelona	Athletics	Women's shot put B2
Silver	Radomir Rakonjac	1992 Barcelona	Shooting	Mixed air pistol SH1
Silver	Nenad Krisanovic	1992 Barcelona	Swimming	Men's 50 m butterfly S3-4
Bronze	Zlatko Kesler	1992 Barcelona	Table tennis	Men's singles 3

== See also ==
- Yugoslavia at the Paralympics
- Independent Olympic participants at the 1992 Summer Olympics
