= Slovenia at the Paralympics =

- IPC code: SLO
- NPC: Sports Federation for the Disabled of Slovenia
- Website: www.zsis.si
- Medals: Gold 5 Silver 10 Bronze 11 Total 26

Summer appearances
- 1992; 1996; 2000; 2004; 2008; 2012; 2016; 2020; 2024

Winter appearances
- 1998; 2002; 2006; 2010; 2014; 2018; 2022

Other related appearances
- Yugoslavia (1972–2000)

Slovenia has competed as an independent country at the Summer Paralympic Games since the 1992 Games in Barcelona. Slovenian athletes have won a total of five gold, ten silver and eleven bronze medals.

Since 2008, Slovenian medal winners at the Paralympics receive a financial reward equal to that received by Olympic medal winners.

== Medal tallies ==
=== Summer Paralympics ===
Event	Gold	Silver	Bronze	Total	Ranking
1992 Summer Paralympics	2	0	1	3	35th
1996 Summer Paralympics	0	2	3	5	53rd
2000 Summer Paralympics	0	2	2	4	55th
2004 Summer Paralympics	1	2	1	4	49th
2008 Summer Paralympics	0	1	2	3	59th
2012 Summer Paralympics	0	1	0	1	67th
2016 Summer Paralympics	1	1	0	2	58th
2020 Summer Paralympics	0	1	1	2	71st
2024 Summer Paralympics	1	0	1	2	61st
Total	5	10	11	26	

== Medalists ==
Medal	Name	Games	Sport	Event
Gold	Franjo Izlakar	(Spain) 1992 Barcelona	Athletics	Men's discus throw C7
Gold	Franjo Izlakar	(Spain) 1992 Barcelona	Athletics	Men's shot put C7
Bronze	Dragica Lapornik	(Spain) 1992 Barcelona	Athletics	Women's shot put THW5
Silver	Franjo Izlakar	(United States) 1996 Atlanta	Athletics	Men's shot put F36
Silver	Franc Pinter	(United States) 1996 Atlanta	Shooting	Men's air rifle standing SH1
Bronze	Janez Roškar	(United States) 1996 Atlanta	Athletics	Men's javelin throw F54
Bronze	Danijel Pavlinec	(United States) 1996 Atlanta	Swimming	Men's 100 m freestyle S6
Bronze	Danijel Pavlinec	(United States) 1996 Atlanta	Swimming	Men's 200 m freestyle S6
Silver	Franjo Izlakar	(Australia) 2000 Sydney	Athletics	Men's shot put F37
Silver	Franc Pinter	(Australia) 2000 Sydney	Shooting	Men's air rifle standing SH1
Bronze	Janez Roškar	(Australia) 2000 Sydney	Athletics	Men's javelin throw F55
Bronze	Dragica Lapornik	(Australia) 2000 Sydney	Athletics	Women's shot put F55
Gold	Mateja Pintar	(Greece) 2004 Athens	Table tennis	Women's individual Class 3
Silver	Tatjana Majcen	(Greece) 2004 Athens	Athletics	Women's javelin throw F54/55
Silver	Franc Pinter	(Greece) 2004 Athens	Shooting	Men's air rifle standing SH1
Bronze	Tatjana Majcen	(Greece) 2004 Athens	Athletics	Women's shot put F54/55
Silver	Jože Flere	(China) 2008 Beijing	Athletics	Men's discus throw F32/51
Bronze	Franc Pinter	(China) 2008 Beijing	Shooting	Men's 10 m air rifle standing SH1
Bronze	Mateja Pintar	(China) 2008 Beijing	Table tennis	Women's individual Class 3
Silver	Franček Gorazd Tiršek	(United Kingdom) 2012 London	Shooting	Mixed 10 m air rifle standing SH2
Gold	Veselka Pevec	(Brazil) 2016 Rio de Janeiro	Shooting	Mixed 10 m air rifle standing SH2
Silver	Franček Gorazd Tiršek	(Brazil) 2016 Rio de Janeiro	Shooting	Mixed 10 m air rifle standing SH2
Silver	Franček Gorazd Tiršek	(Japan) 2020 Tokyo	Shooting	Mixed 10 m air rifle standing SH2
Bronze	Franček Gorazd Tiršek	(Japan) 2020 Tokyo	Shooting	Mixed 10 m air rifle prone SH2
Gold	Franček Gorazd Tiršek	(France) 2024 Paris	Shooting	Mixed 10 m air rifle standing SH2
Bronze	Živa Lavrinc; Dejan Fabčič	(France) 2024 Paris	Archery	Mixed team recurve

== See also ==
- Slovenia at the Olympics
