= Yugoslavia at the Paralympics =

- Flag of Yugoslavia
- IPC code: YUG
- Medals: Gold 22 Silver 23 Bronze 34 Total 79

Summer appearances
- 1972; 1976; 1980; 1984; 1988; 1992; 1996; 2000

Winter appearances
- 1976; 1980; 1984; 1988

Other related appearances
- Independent Paralympic Participants (1992); Bosnia and Herzegovina (1992–pres.); Croatia (1992–pres.); Serbia and Montenegro (2004); North Macedonia (1996–pres.); Slovenia (1992–pres.); Montenegro (2008–pres.); Serbia (2008–pres.)

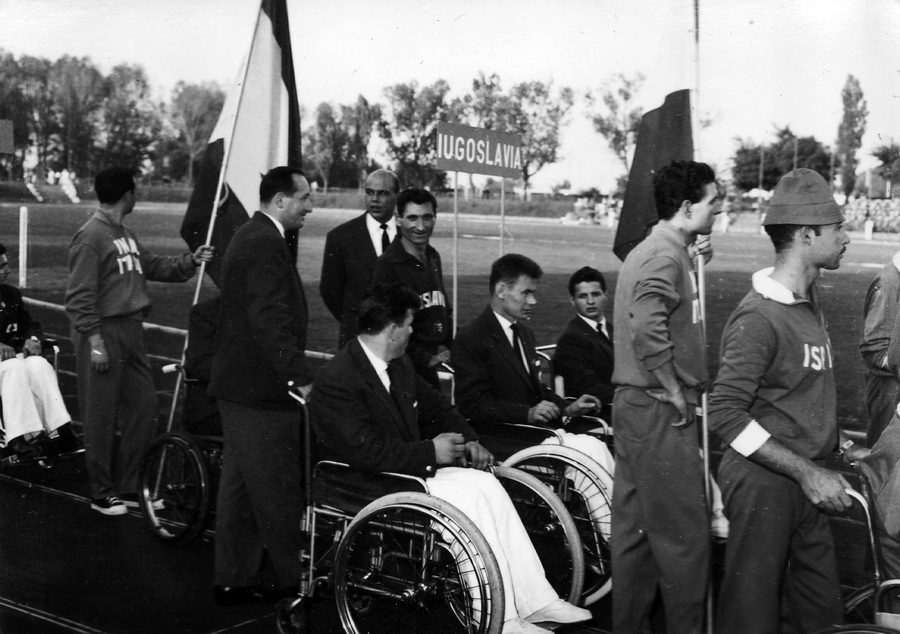
Yugoslavia at the opening ceremony in Rome 1960

Yugoslavia made its Paralympic Games début at the 1960 Summer Paralympics in Rome. It reappeared at 1972 Summer Paralympics in Heidelberg. It did not compete at the 1976 Summer Games, but did take part in the inaugural Winter Paralympics that year in Örnsköldsvik. In 1980, 1984 and 1988, it took part in both the Summer and Winter Games.

Following the breakup of Yugoslavia, the proclamation of the Federal Republic of Yugoslavia as a successor state uniting Serbia and Montenegro was not immediately recognised by the International Paralympic Committee. In accordance with United Nations Security Council Resolution 757, Yugoslavia was barred from competing at the 1992 Summer Games as a national delegation. Yugoslav athletes competed, instead, as Independent Paralympic Participants. Yugoslavia was subsequently recognised once more, and returned to compete at the 1996 Summer Games. Absent from the 1998 Winter Games, it made its final appearance under the name "Yugoslavia" at the 2000 Summer Paralympics, before competing as Serbia and Montenegro at the 2004 Summer Games. The 2006 split in the union led to Serbia and Montenegro competing separately from then on. Kosovo made its Paralympic debut at the Paralympics in Paris 2024.

Although Yugoslavia never hosted the Paralympic Games, it did organise the first disabled skiing competition as an Olympic demonstration event when it hosted the 1984 Winter Olympics in Sarajevo.

Yugoslav athletes won a total of 76 medals at the Paralympics, of which 75 at the Summer Games. 21 of these were gold medals (all at the Summer Games).

== Timeline of participation at the Paralympic Games ==
Nation	Code	First Games	Last Games
(Socialist Federal Republic of Yugoslavia) SFR Yugoslavia	YUG	1960	1988
Croatia	CRO	1992	
Slovenia	SLO	1992	
Independent Paralympic Participants	IOP	1992	
Bosnia and Herzegovina	BIH	1996	
North Macedonia	MKD	1996	
(Federal Republic of Yugoslavia) FR Yugoslavia	YUG	1996	2000
Serbia and Montenegro	SCG	2004	
Serbia	SRB	2008	
Montenegro	MNE	2008	
Kosovo	KOS	2024	

== Medal tables ==
These tables include every participation by “Yugoslavia”, as recognised by the International Paralympic Committee.

=== Medals by Summer Games ===
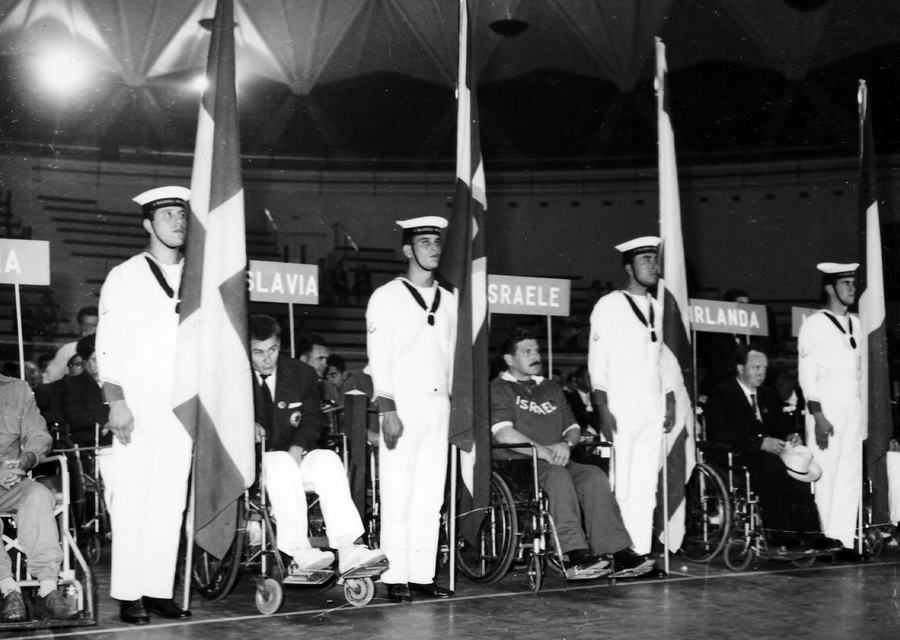
Yugoslavia at the closing ceremony in Rome 1960

Games	Gold	Silver	Bronze	Total
1960 Rome	0	0	0	0
1972 Heidelberg	1	1	2	4
1980 Arnhem	4	5	9	18
1984 Stoke Mandeville / New York	11	10	11	32
1988 Seoul	4	4	11	19
1996 Atlanta	2	2	0	4
2000 Sydney	0	1	0	1
Totals (7 entries)	22	23	33	78

=== Medals by Winter Games ===
Games	Gold	Silver	Bronze	Total
1976 Örnsköldsvik	0	0	0	0
1980 Geilo	0	0	0	0
1984 Innsbruck	0	0	1	1
1988 Innsbruck	0	0	0	0
Totals (4 entries)	0	0	1	1

== Medalists ==
=== Summer Paralympics ===
Medal	Name	Games	Sport	Event
Gold	Pavla Sitar	(Germany) 1972 Heidelberg	Athletics	Women's 60m wheelchair 2
Silver	Milka Milinkovic	(Germany) 1972 Heidelberg	Athletics	Women's 60m wheelchair 4
Bronze	Joze Okoren	(Germany) 1972 Heidelberg	Athletics	Men's discus throw 2
Bronze	Milka Milinkovic	(Germany) 1972 Heidelberg	Athletics	Women's javelin throw 4
Gold	Jozef Banfi	(Netherlands) 1980 Arnhem	Swimming	Men's 100m breaststroke D1
Gold	Jozef Banfi	(Netherlands) 1980 Arnhem	Swimming	Men's 3x50m individual medley D1
Gold	Svetislav Dimitrijevic	(Netherlands) 1980 Arnhem	Table tennis	Men's singles E
Gold	Svetislav Dimitrijevic; Franc Simunic	(Netherlands) 1980 Arnhem	Table tennis	Men's teams E
Silver	Joze Okoren	(Netherlands) 1980 Arnhem	Athletics	Men's discus throw 2
Silver	Roko Mikelin	(Netherlands) 1980 Arnhem	Swimming	Men's 50m backstroke E1
Silver	Roko Mikelin	(Netherlands) 1980 Arnhem	Swimming	Men's 50m freestyle E1
Silver	Roko Mikelin	(Netherlands) 1980 Arnhem	Swimming	Men's 3x50m individual medley E1
Silver	Franc Simunic	(Netherlands) 1980 Arnhem	Table tennis	Men's singles E
Bronze	Miroslav Jancic	(Netherlands) 1980 Arnhem	Athletics	Men's 5000m walk A
Bronze	Marjan Peternelj	(Netherlands) 1980 Arnhem	Athletics	Men's javelin throw 4
Bronze	Franjo Izlakar	(Netherlands) 1980 Arnhem	Athletics	Men's shot put CP D
Bronze	Milka Milinkovic	(Netherlands) 1980 Arnhem	Athletics	Women's javelin throw 4
Bronze	Milka Milinkovic	(Netherlands) 1980 Arnhem	Athletics	Women's shot put 4
Bronze	Roko Mikelin	(Netherlands) 1980 Arnhem	Swimming	Men's 50m breaststroke E1
Bronze	Vangel Zabev	(Netherlands) 1980 Arnhem	Swimming	Men's 50m freestyle E1
Bronze	Vangel Zabev	(Netherlands) 1980 Arnhem	Swimming	Men's 3x50m individual medley E1
Bronze	Men's volleyball team	(Netherlands) 1980 Arnhem	Volleyball	Men's sitting tournament
Gold	Rudi Kocmut	(United Kingdom) / (United States) 1984 Stoke Mandeville/New York	Athletics	Men's 400m C7
Gold	Ante Pehar	(United Kingdom) / (United States) 1984 Stoke Mandeville/New York	Athletics	Men's long jump B2
Gold	Ante Pehar	(United Kingdom) / (United States) 1984 Stoke Mandeville/New York	Athletics	Men's triple jump B2
Gold	Zeljko Dereta	(United Kingdom) / (United States) 1984 Stoke Mandeville/New York	Athletics	Men's club throw C2
Gold	Marjan Peternelj	(United Kingdom) / (United States) 1984 Stoke Mandeville/New York	Athletics	Men's javelin throw 3
Gold	Franjo Izlakar	(United Kingdom) / (United States) 1984 Stoke Mandeville/New York	Athletics	Men's shot put C7
Gold	Miroslav Jancic	(United Kingdom) / (United States) 1984 Stoke Mandeville/New York	Athletics	Men's pentathlon B1
Gold	Milka Milinkovic	(United Kingdom) / (United States) 1984 Stoke Mandeville/New York	Athletics	Women's javelin throw 3
Gold	Simo Kecman	(United Kingdom) / (United States) 1984 Stoke Mandeville/New York	Shooting	Men's air pistol integrated
Gold	Men's relay team	(United Kingdom) / (United States) 1984 Stoke Mandeville/New York	Swimming	Men's 4x50m freestyle relay A1-A9
Gold	Franc Simonic	(United Kingdom) / (United States) 1984 Stoke Mandeville/New York	Table tennis	Men's singles L5
Silver	Ramon Odzakovic	(United Kingdom) / (United States) 1984 Stoke Mandeville/New York	Athletics	Men's 400m B2
Silver	Ramon Odzakovic	(United Kingdom) / (United States) 1984 Stoke Mandeville/New York	Athletics	Men's 800m B2
Silver	Slobodan Adzic	(United Kingdom) / (United States) 1984 Stoke Mandeville/New York	Athletics	Men's 1500m A5
Silver	Slobodan Adzic	(United Kingdom) / (United States) 1984 Stoke Mandeville/New York	Athletics	Men's 5000m A5
Silver	Miroslav Jancic	(United Kingdom) / (United States) 1984 Stoke Mandeville/New York	Athletics	Men's javelin throw B1
Silver	Zeljko Dereta	(United Kingdom) / (United States) 1984 Stoke Mandeville/New York	Athletics	Men's shot put C2
Silver	Refija Okic	(United Kingdom) / (United States) 1984 Stoke Mandeville/New York	Athletics	Women's 400m B1
Silver	Milka Milinkovic	(United Kingdom) / (United States) 1984 Stoke Mandeville/New York	Athletics	Women's shot put 3
Silver	Jozef Banfi	(United Kingdom) / (United States) 1984 Stoke Mandeville/New York	Swimming	Men's 100m backstroke A1
Bronze	Slobodan Adzic	(United Kingdom) / (United States) 1984 Stoke Mandeville/New York	Athletics	Men's 400m A5
Bronze	Marjan Peternelj	(United Kingdom) / (United States) 1984 Stoke Mandeville/New York	Athletics	Men's shot put 3
Bronze	D. Lapornik	(United Kingdom) / (United States) 1984 Stoke Mandeville/New York	Athletics	Women's shot put 4
Bronze	Men's goalball team	(United Kingdom) / (United States) 1984 Stoke Mandeville/New York	Goalball	Men's tournament
Bronze	Roko Mikelin	(United Kingdom) / (United States) 1984 Stoke Mandeville/New York	Swimming	Men's 50m backstroke A9
Bronze	Jozef Banfi	(United Kingdom) / (United States) 1984 Stoke Mandeville/New York	Swimming	Men's 100m breaststroke A1
Bronze	Roko Mikelin	(United Kingdom) / (United States) 1984 Stoke Mandeville/New York	Swimming	Men's 100m freestyle A9
Bronze	Brigita Galicic	(United Kingdom) / (United States) 1984 Stoke Mandeville/New York	Swimming	Women's 100m freestyle L5
Bronze	Z. Gajic	(United Kingdom) / (United States) 1984 Stoke Mandeville/New York	Table tennis	Men's open CL
Bronze	Ilija Djurasinovic	(United Kingdom) / (United States) 1984 Stoke Mandeville/New York	Table tennis	Men's singles L2
Bronze	Z. Gajic	(United Kingdom) / (United States) 1984 Stoke Mandeville/New York	Table tennis	Men's singles L4
Gold	Milka Milinkovic	(South Korea) 1988 Seoul	Athletics	Women's shot put 4
Gold	Nada Vuksanovic	(South Korea) 1988 Seoul	Athletics	Women's shot put B2
Gold	Men's goalball team	(South Korea) 1988 Seoul	Goalball	Men's tournament
Silver	Rudolf Kocmut	(South Korea) 1988 Seoul	Athletics	Men's 1500m C7
Silver	Ruzica Aleksov	(South Korea) 1988 Seoul	Shooting	Women's air pistol standing LSH2
Silver	Danijel Pavlinec	(South Korea) 1988 Seoul	Swimming	Men's 100m freestyle L3
Silver	Svetislav Dimitrijevic	(South Korea) 1988 Seoul	Swimming	Men's singles TT7
Bronze	Slobodan Adzic	(South Korea) 1988 Seoul	Athletics	Men's 400m A5/A7
Bronze	Slobodan Adzic	(South Korea) 1988 Seoul	Athletics	Men's 5000m A6/A8-9/L4
Bronze	Ante Pehar	(South Korea) 1988 Seoul	Athletics	Men's triple jump B2
Bronze	Zeljko Dereta	(South Korea) 1988 Seoul	Athletics	Men's discus throw C3
Bronze	Milorad Nikolic	(South Korea) 1988 Seoul	Athletics	Men's javelin throw 1C
Bronze	Marjan Peternelj	(South Korea) 1988 Seoul	Athletics	Men's javelin throw 3
Bronze	Refija Okic	(South Korea) 1988 Seoul	Athletics	Women's 800m B1
Bronze	Refija Okic	(South Korea) 1988 Seoul	Athletics	Women's 1500m B1
Bronze	Danijel Pavlinec	(South Korea) 1988 Seoul	Swimming	Men's 200m freestyle L3
Bronze	Roko Mikelin	(South Korea) 1988 Seoul	Swimming	Men's 100m backstroke A7
Gold	Ruzica Aleksov	(United States) 1996 Atlanta	Shooting	Women's air pistol SH1
Gold	Zlatko Kesler	(United States) 1996 Atlanta	Table tennis	Men's singles 3
Silver	Ruzica Aleksov	(United States) 1996 Atlanta	Shooting	Mixed free pistol .22 SH1
Silver	Nenad Krisanovic	(United States) 1996 Atlanta	Swimming	Men's 50m breaststroke SB2
Silver	Zlatko Kesler	(Australia) 2000 Sydney	Table tennis	Men's singles 3

=== Winter Paralympics ===
Medal	Name	Games	Sport	Event
Bronze	Franc Komar	(Austria) 1984 Innsbruck	Alpine skiing	Men's alpine combination LW6/8

== See also ==
- Yugoslavia at the Olympics
