= Trophy Victor Boin =

Paralympics Belgium recognizes the achievements of Belgian Paralympic athletes, coaches and administrators through this award. It is named after Victor Boin, co-founder and first president of the Belgian Paralympic Committee, and was created in the year of his death, 1974. The Trophy is awarded once a year to either a Belgian Paralympic athlete in regards of his/her achievements in the previous year or to honor his entire career or to an individual in recognition of his career and/or important role in the Belgian Paralympic movement. The Trophy Victor Boin can only be won once.

== Winners ==
Year	Winner (Male)
1974	Richard De Zutter
1975	Alice Desal-Verhee
1976	Guy Grun
1977	Remi Van Ophem
1978	Philippe Wouters
1979	Mark De Meyer
1980	Achiel Braet
1981	Paul van Winkel
1982	Mark Devos
1983	Jef Devriese
1984	Marie-Line Pollet
1985	Alex Hermans
1986	Mario Dorigo
1987	Alain Ledoux
1988	Hans Pauwel
1989	Claude Van Coillie
1990	Linda Hortz
1991	José Rebordinos
1992	Benny Govaerts
1993	Robert Lorent
1994	Sabrina Bellavia
1995	Sébastien Xhrouet
1996	Steve Orens
1997	Thierry Daubresse
1998	Gino De Keersmaeker
1999	Carine Van Puyvelde
2000	Kurt Vanraefelghem
2001	Marc Ledoux
2002	Belgian Lions (C.A.S. - Herent)
2003	Dirk Boon
2004	Mathieu Loicq
2005	Dimitri Ghion
2006	Koen Adriaenssens
2007	Nico Vergeylen
2008	Jan Boyen
2009	Annick Sevenans
2010	Wim Decleir
2011	Sven Decaesstecker
2012	Michèle George
2013	Joachim Gérard
2014	Marieke Vervoort
2015	Pieter Cilissen
2016	Peter Genyn
2017	Christophe Hindricq
2018	Eléonor Sana
2019	Barbara Minneci
2020	Johan De Rick
2021	Laurens Devos
2022	Griet Hoet & Anneleen Monsieur
2023	Maxime Hordies
2024	Jean-François Deberg
2025	Jonas Van de Steene

== See also ==
- Belgium at the Paralympics
