= Belgium at the 2024 Summer Paralympics =

- Flag of Belgium
- IPC code: BEL
- NPC: Belgian Paralympic Committee

in Paris, France August 28, 2024 – September 8, 2024
- Competitors: 29 (21 men and 8 women) in 10 sports
- Flag bearers (opening): Manon Claeys; Joachim Gerard
- Flag bearers (closing): Léa Bayekula; Laurens Devos
- Medals Ranked 20th: Gold 7 Silver 4 Bronze 3 Total 14

Summer Paralympics appearances (overview)
- 1960; 1964; 1968; 1972; 1976; 1980; 1984; 1988; 1992; 1996; 2000; 2004; 2008; 2012; 2016; 2020; 2024

Belgium competed at the 2024 Summer Paralympics in Paris, France, from 28 August to 8 September.

== Medalists ==
Medal	Name	Sport	Event	Date
Gold	Maxime Carabin	Athletics	Men's 400 m T52	30 August
Gold	Michèle George	Equestrian	Individual championship test grade V	4 September
Gold	Léa Bayekula	Athletics	Women's 100 m T54	4 September
Gold	Léa Bayekula	Athletics	Women's 400 m T54	5 September
Gold	Maxime Carabin	Athletics	Men's 100 m T52	6 September
Gold	Michèle George	Equestrian	Individual freestyle test grade V	7 September
Gold	Laurens Devos	Table tennis	Men's singles – Class 9	7 September
Silver	Ewoud Vromant	Cycling	Men's individual pursuit C2	30 August
Silver	Ewoud Vromant	Cycling	Men's road time trial C2	4 September
Silver	Maxime Hordies	Cycling	Men's road time trial H1	4 September
Silver	Peter Genyn	Athletics	Men's 100 m T51	6 September
Bronze	Peter Genyn	Athletics	Men's 200 m T51	3 September
Bronze	Tim Celen	Cycling	Men's road time trial T1–2	4 September
Bronze	Jonas Van de Steene	Cycling	Men's road time trial H4	4 September

== Competitors ==
The following is the list of number of competitors in the Games.

Sport	Men	Women	Total
Archery	1	0	1
Athletics	4	3	8
Badminton	0	1	1
Boccia	1	0	1
Cycling	6	0	6
Equestrian	1	3	4
Paratriathlon	1	0	1
Swimming	2	1	3
Table tennis	4	0	4
Wheelchair tennis	1	0	1
Total	21	8	29

== Archery ==
Belgium secured a quota place in the men's compound event by virtue of their result at the 2023 World Para Archery Championships in Plzeň, Czech Republic.

Athlete	Event	Ranking Round		Round of 32	Round of 16	Quarterfinals	Semifinals	Finals	
Athlete	Event	Score	Seed	Opposition Score	Opposition Score	Opposition Score	Opposition Score	Opposition Score	Rank
Piotr Van Montagu	Men's individual compound	694	8	Atamanenko (UKR); W 139-140	Kadhim (IRQ); W 141-143	AI (CHN); L 140-148	Did not advance		8

== Athletics ==
Belgian track and field athletes achieved quota places for the following events based on their results at the 2023 World Championships, 2024 World Championships, or through high performance allocation, as long as they meet the minimum entry standard (MES).

Key

- Note–Ranks given for track events are within the athlete's heat only
- Q = Qualified for the next round
- q = Qualified for the next round as a fastest loser or, in field events, by position without achieving the qualifying target
- DQ = Disqualified
- PR = Paralympic Record
- AR = Area (or continental) Record
- NR = National Record
- SB = Season's Best
- N/A = Round not applicable for the event
- Bye = Athlete not required to compete in round

Men's track and road events

Athlete	Event	Heats		Final	
Athlete	Event	Result	Rank	Result	Rank
Maxime Carabin	Men's 100 m T52	16.21 PR	1 Q	16.70	1st place, gold medalist(s)
Maxime Carabin	Men's 400 m T52	54.48 PR	1 Q	55.10	1st place, gold medalist(s)
Martin Clobert; Guide:Nathan de Bilderling; Sebastien Thirion	Men's marathon T12	—N/a		2:38:34	11
Peter Genyn	Men's 100m T51	—N/a		20.47	2nd place, silver medalist(s)
Peter Genyn	Men's 200 m T51	—N/a		38.65	3rd place, bronze medalist(s)
Roger Habsch	Men's 100 m T51	—N/a		22.41	6
Roger Habsch	Men's 200 m T51	—N/a		42.35	5

Women's track and road events

Athlete	Event	Heats		Final	
Athlete	Event	Result	Rank	Result	Rank
Léa Bayekula	Women's 100 m T54	15.87	1 Q	15.50 PR	1st place, gold medalist(s)
Léa Bayekula	Women's 400 m T54	52.25	1 Q	53.05	1st place, gold medalist(s)
Léa Bayekula	Wome's 800 m T54	1:45.42	1 Q	1:43.63 PB	5
Kiara Maene	Women's 400 m T20	1:06.25	7	Did not advance	
Selma van Kerm	Women's 400 m T37	—N/a		1:14.80	8

== Badminton ==
Belgium has qualified one para badminton player for the following events, through the release of BWF para-badminton Race to Paris Paralympic Ranking; also marking nation's debut at the para sport.

Athlete	Event	Group Stage				Quarterfinal	Semifinal	Final / BM	
Athlete	Event	Opposition Score	Opposition Score	Opposition Score	Rank	Opposition Score	Opposition Score	Opposition Score	Rank
Man-Kei To	Women's singles WH1	Koosz (AUT); W (21–7, 21–6)	Kwon (KOR); W (21–12, 21–10)	—N/a	1 Q	Kwon (KOR); W (6–21, 14–21)	Pookkham (THA); L (13-21, 15-21)	Yin (CHN); L (21-9, 21-9)	4

== Boccia ==
The World Boccia Competition Committee, in association with the International Paralympic Committee, granted Belgium's Francis Rombouts a qualification spot via the bi-partite slot allocation process.

Athlete	Event	Pool matches				Playoffs	Quarterfinals	Semifinals	Final / BM	
Athlete	Event	Opposition Score	Opposition Score	Opposition Score	Rank	Opposition Score	Opposition Score	Opposition Score	Opposition Score	Rank
Francis Rombouts	Men's individual BC2	Seo M-k (KOR); L 2–5	Ben Youb (TUN); W 7–0	Saengampa (THA); L 0–11	2 Q	Herlangga (INA); L 1–7	Did not advance			12

== Cycling ==
Belgium has qualified 6 para-cyclists (six men) based on the UCI Nations Rankings for 2024.

=== Road ===
Men

Athlete	Event	Time	Rank
Maxime Hordies	Time trial H1	35:11.13	2nd place, silver medalist(s)
Maxime Hordies	Road race H1–2	DNF	
Tim Celen	Time trial T1-2	23:27.64	3rd place, bronze medalist(s)
Tim Celen	Road race T1-2	1:21:25	6
Marvin Odent	Time trial H3	46:20.51	4
Marvin Odent	Road race H3	1:40:00	6
Jonas Van de Steene	Time trial H4	41:52.22	3rd place, bronze medalist(s)
Jonas Van de Steene	Road race H4	DNF	
Ewoud Vromant	Time trial C2	19:26.61	2nd place, silver medalist(s)
Ewoud Vromant	Road race C1–2–3	1:50:33	8
Louis Clincke	Time trial C4	38:22.70	4
Louis Clincke	Road race C4-5	2:32:24	12

Mixed

Athlete	Event	Time	Rank
Maxime Hordies; Marvin Odent; Jonas Van de Steene	Mixed team relay H1–5	DNS	

=== Track ===
Men

Athlete	Event	Qualification		Final	
Athlete	Event	Time	Rank	Opposition Time	Rank
Ewoud Vromant	Individual pursuit C2	3:27.640	2 QG	3:28.062	2nd place, silver medalist(s)

== Equestrian ==
Belgium entered a full squad of four para-equestrians into the Paralympic equestrian competition by finishing in the top seven nation's at the 2022 FEI World Championships in Herning, Denmark.

Individual

Athlete	Horse	Event	Score	Rank
Manon Claeys	Katharina Sollenburg	Individual championship test grade IV	67.667	6 Q
Manon Claeys	Katharina Sollenburg	Individual freestyle test grade IV	75.995	6
Michèle George	Best of 8	Individual championship test grade V	76.692	(gold) Q
Michèle George	Best of 8	Individual freestyle test grade V	81.470	1st place, gold medalist(s)
Barbara Minneci	Stuart	Individual championship test grade III	66.667	7 Q
Barbara Minneci	Stuart	Individual freestyle test grade III	72.281	7
Kevin Van Ham	Eros Van Ons Heem	Individual championship test grade V	69.692	6 Q
Kevin Van Ham	Eros Van Ons Heem	Individual freestyle test grade V	73.010	5

Team

Athlete	Horse	Event	Individual score	Total	
Athlete	Horse	Event	TT	Score	Rank
Manon Claeys	See above	Team	72.621	219.189	7
Michèle George	See above	Team	77.868	219.189	7
Barbara Minneci	See above	Team	68.700	219.189	7

== Paratriathlon ==
Belgium athletes earned 1 quota place in paratriathlon at the 2024 Summer Paralympics by having a top nine ranking in the World Paratriathlon rankings for their classification on 1 July 2024; also marking the nations debut in the para sport.

Athlete	Event	Swim	Trans 1	Bike	Trans 2	Run	Total time	Rank
Wim De Paepe	Men's PTS2	11:06	1:17	33.34	1:16	22:03	1:09:16	5

== Swimming ==
Belgium have qualified three swimmers, two male and one female, to compete at the 2020 Summer Paralympics.

Athlete	Event	Heats		Final	
Athlete	Event	Result	Rank	Result	Rank
Sam de Visser	Men's 400m freestyle S9	4:25.22	5 Q	4:21.23	6
Aymeric Parmentier	Men's 100m breaststroke SB14	1:08.92	9	Did not advance	9
Tatyana Lebrun	Women's 100m breaststroke SB9	1:18.25	5 Q	1:18.39	5
Tatyana Lebrun	Women's 100m butterfly S10	1:16.67	14	Did not advance	14
Tatyana Lebrun	Women's 200m individual medley SM10	2:35.55	5 Q	2:32.79	4

== Table tennis ==
Belgium entered four athletes for the Paralympic games. Laurens Devos and Florian Van Acker qualified for their games by virtue of their gold medal results, in their respective class, through the 2023 European Para Championships held in Sheffield, Great Britain; meanwhile Marc Ledoux and Ben Ashok Despineux qualified for the games through the doubles slot allocation resp. the bipartite selection process.

Athlete	Event	First round	Second round	Quarterfinals	Semifinals	Final / BM	
Athlete	Event	Opposition Result	Opposition Result	Opposition Result	Opposition Result	Opposition Result	Rank
Ben Ashok Despineux	Men's individual C7	—N/a	Montanus (NED); L 1-3	Did not advance			
Marc Ledoux	Men's individual C8	Makhulbekov (KAZ); W 3-1	Zhao (CHN); L 3-0	Did not advance			
Laurens Devos	Men's individual C9	—N/a	Bye	Gustafsson (SWE); W 3-0	Cepas (ESP); W 3-0	Didier (FRA); W 3-0	1st place, gold medalist(s)
Florian Van Acker	Men's individual C11	—N/a	Bye	Chen (TPE); L 3-1	Did not advance		
Laurens Devos; Marc Ledoux	Men's doubles MD18	—N/a	Didukh / Nikolenko (UKR); W 3-1	Lian / Zhao (CHN); L 0-3	Did not advance		

== Wheelchair tennis ==
Belgium qualified one player entry for wheelchair tennis by the world rankings.

Athlete	Event	Round of 64	Round of 32	Round of 16	Quarterfinals	Semifinals	Final / BM	
Athlete	Event	Opposition Result	Opposition Result	Opposition Result	Opposition Result	Opposition Result	Opposition Result	Rank
Joachim Gérard	Men's singles	Bye	Menguy (FRA); L 6-3, 3-6, 6-7	Did not advance				

== See also ==
- Belgium at the 2024 Summer Olympics
- Belgium at the Paralympics
