= Belgium at the 2020 Summer Paralympics =

- Flag of Belgium
- IPC code: BEL
- NPC: Belgian Paralympic Committee

in Tokyo, Japan August 24, 2021 – September 5, 2021
- Competitors: 31 in 10 sports
- Flag bearers: Michèle George and Bruno Vanhove
- Medals: Gold 4 Silver 3 Bronze 8 Total 15

Summer Paralympics appearances (overview)
- 1960; 1964; 1968; 1972; 1976; 1980; 1984; 1988; 1992; 1996; 2000; 2004; 2008; 2012; 2016; 2020; 2024

Belgium competed in the 2020 Summer Paralympics in Tokyo, Japan from 25 August to 6 September.

== Medalists ==
Medal	Name	Sport	Event	Date
Gold	Michèle George	Equestrian	Individual championship test grade V	26 August
Gold	Laurens Devos	Table tennis	Men's individual – Class 9	28 August
Gold	Michèle George	Equestrian	Individual freestyle test grade V	30 August
Gold	Peter Genyn	Athletics	Men's 100 metres T51	3 September
Silver	Ewoud Vromant	Cycling	Men's road time trial C2	31 August
Silver	Peter Genyn	Athletics	Men's 200 metres T51	31 August
Silver	Tim Celen	Cycling	Men's road race T1–2	2 September
Bronze	Griet Hoet; Pilot: Anneleen Monsieur	Cycling	Women's individual pursuit B	26 August
Bronze	Manon Claeys	Equestrian	Individual championship test grade IV	26 August
Bronze	Florian Van Acker	Table tennis	Men's individual class 11	28 August
Bronze	Manon Claeys	Equestrian	Individual freestyle test grade IV	30 August
Bronze	Roger Habsch	Athletics	Men's 200 metres T51	31 August
Bronze	Maxime Hordies	Cycling	Men's road time trial H1	31 August
Bronze	Tim Celen	Cycling	Men's road time trial T1–2	31 August
Bronze	Roger Habsch	Athletics	Men's 100 metres T51	3 September

== Competitors ==
Sport	Men	Women	Total
Archery	1	0	1
Athletics	2	2	4
Boccia	1	0	1
Cycling	6	2	8
Equestrian	1	3	4
Goalball	6	0	6
Swimming	1	1	2
Table Tennis	3	0	3
Wheelchair Tennis	2	0	2
Total	23	8	31

== Archery ==
Piotr Van Montagu has qualified to compete following winning a silver medal at the Paralympic Qualifying Tournament.

Athlete	Event	Ranking round		Round of 32	Round of 16	Quarterfinals	Semifinals	Finals	
Athlete	Event	Score	Seed	Opposition score	Opposition score	Opposition score	Opposition score	Opposition score	Rank
Piotr Van Montagu	Men's individual compound	683 PB	18	Aungaphinan (THA); W 143–130	Biabani (IRI); L 142–143	Did not qualify			

== Athletics ==
Men's track

Athlete	Event	Heats		Final	
Athlete	Event	Result	Rank	Result	Rank
Peter Genyn	100m T51	—N/a		20.33 PR	1st place, gold medalist(s)
Peter Genyn	200m T51	—N/a		37.11	2nd place, silver medalist(s)
Roger Habsch	100m T51	—N/a		20.76	3rd place, bronze medalist(s)
Roger Habsch	200m T51	—N/a		38.33	3rd place, bronze medalist(s)

Women's track

Athlete	Event	Heats		Final	
Athlete	Event	Result	Rank	Result	Rank
Gitte Haenen	100m T63	16.70 SB	6	Did not advance	
Joyce Lefevre	100m T34	—N/a		19.63	7
Joyce Lefevre	800m T34	—N/a		2:24.96	7

Women's field

Athlete	Event	Final	
Athlete	Event	Result	Rank
Gitte Haenen	Long jump T63	3.72 SB	9

== Boccia ==
Belgium have qualified to compete at boccia for the first time via world rankings.

Athlete	Event	Preliminaries			Round of 16	Quarterfinals	Semifinals	Final	
Athlete	Event	Opponent	Opposition Score	Rank	Opposition Score	Opposition Score	Opposition Score	Opposition Score	Rank
Francis Rombouts	Individual BC2	Mezik (SVK)	L 2–10	3	Did not advance				
Francis Rombouts	Individual BC2	Saengampa (THA)	L 2-2*	3	Did not advance				
Francis Rombouts	Individual BC2	Hipwell (GBR)	W 8–1	3	Did not advance				

== Cycling ==
Diederick Schelfhout, Ewoud Vromant, Griet Hoet, Jean-François Deberg, Jonas Van De Steene, Laurence Vandevyver, Maxime Hordies and Tim Celen have all qualified to compete.

=== Road ===
Men

Athlete	Event	Time	Rank
Maxime Hordies	Time trial H1	47:01.23	3rd place, bronze medalist(s)
Maxime Hordies	Road race H1–2	-1 Lap	
Tim Celen	Time trial T1-2	30:44.21	3rd place, bronze medalist(s)
Tim Celen	Road race T1-2	52:15	2nd place, silver medalist(s)
Jean-François Deberg	Road race H3	2:41:33	5
Diederick Schelfhout	Time trial C3	38:54.84	12
Diederick Schelfhout	Road race C1–3	2:11:06	8
Jonas Van de Steen	Time trial H4	44:07.03	9
Jonas Van de Steen	Road race H4	2:23:54	4
Ewoud Vromant	Time trial C2	36:11.79	2nd place, silver medalist(s)
Ewoud Vromant	Road race C1–3	2:19:19	16

Women

Athlete	Event	Time	Rank
Griet Hoet piloted by Anneleen Monsieur	Time trial B	52:07.58	7
Griet Hoet piloted by Anneleen Monsieur	Road race B	DNF	
Laurence Vandevyver	Time trial H1-3	41:07.14	8

Mixed

Athlete	Event	Time	Rank
Jonas Van de Steen; Laurence Vandevyver; Jean-François Deberg	Mixed team relay H1–5	57:08	8

=== Track ===
Men

Athlete	Event	Qualification		Final	
Athlete	Event	Time	Rank	Opposition Time	Rank
Diederick Schelfhout	Individual pursuit C3	3:30.284	5	Did not qualify	
Diederick Schelfhout	Time trial C1–3	—N/a		1:08.825	7
Ewoud Vromant	Individual pursuit C2	DSQ		did not advance	

Women

Athlete	Event	Qualification		Final	
Athlete	Event	Time	Rank	Opposition Time	Rank
Griet Hoet piloted by Anneleen Monsieur	Time Trial B	—N/a		1:07.943	3rd place, bronze medalist(s)
Griet Hoet piloted by Anneleen Monsieur	Individual Pursuit B	3:25.418 QB	4	3:25.654	4

== Equestrian ==
Belgium have four riders qualified to compete including Barbara Minneci, Kevin Van Ham, Manon Claeys and Michèle George.

Individual

Athlete	Horse	Event	Score	Rank
Manon Claeys	San Dior 2	Mixed individual championship test grade IV	72.853	(bronze) Q
Manon Claeys	San Dior 2	Mixed individual freestyle test grade IV	75.680	3rd place, bronze medalist(s)
Michèle George	Best of 8	Mixed individual championship test grade V	76.476	(gold) Q
Michèle George	Best of 8	Mixed individual freestyle test grade V	80.590	1st place, gold medalist(s)
Barbara Minneci	Stuart	Mixed individual championship test grade III	70.853	6 Q
Barbara Minneci	Stuart	Mixed individual freestyle test grade III	73.840	4
Kevin Van Ham	Eros Van Ons Heem	Mixed individual championship test grade V	69.357	7 Q
Kevin Van Ham	Eros Van Ons Heem	Mixed individual freestyle test grade V	70.860	8

Team

Athlete	Horse	Event	Individual score	Total	
Athlete	Horse	Event	TT	Score	Rank
Manon Claeys	See above	Team	73.775	223.087	5
Michèle George	See above	Team	77.047	223.087	5
Barbara Minneci	See above	Team	72.265	223.087	5

== Goalball ==
Belgium men's national goalball team qualified by winning the bronze medal at the 2018 Goalball World Championships.

=== Men ===
The following is the Belgium roster in the men's goalball tournament of the 2020 Summer Paralympics.

No.	Player	Class	Date of birth (age)
1	Arne Vanhove	B2	17 August 1983 (aged 38)
2	Wassime Amnir	B1	1 February 1991 (aged 30)
3	Bruno Vanhove	B3	17 August 1983 (aged 38)
5	Klison Mapreni	B2	9 October 1992 (aged 28)
6	Tom Vanhove	B2	17 August 1983 (aged 38)
8	Rob Eijssen	B1	11 January 1991 (aged 30)

Group stage

Pos	Team	Pld	W	D	L	GF	GA	GD	Pts	Qualification
1	Belgium	4	2	0	2	18	13	+5	6	Quarter-finals
2	Ukraine	4	2	0	2	18	15	+3	6	Quarter-finals
3	Turkey	4	2	0	2	15	15	0	6	Quarter-finals
4	China	4	2	0	2	21	22	−1	6	Quarter-finals
5	Germany	4	2	0	2	16	23	−7	6	

Source: TOCOG

26 August 2021; 09:00	Belgium	10−3	China	Makuhari Messe, Tokyo; Referees: Woradet Kultawongwattana (Thailand), Bas Spaans (Netherlands)
26 August 2021; 09:00	Mapreni 8 T. Vanhove 1 Amnir 1	Report	Yang Mingyuan 1 Hu Mingyao 1 Lai Liangyu 1	Makuhari Messe, Tokyo; Referees: Woradet Kultawongwattana (Thailand), Bas Spaans (Netherlands)

27 August 2021; 09:00	Turkey	4–6	Belgium	Makuhari Messe, Tokyo; Referees: Yoshinori Nii (Japan), Robert Avery (Great Britain)
27 August 2021; 09:00	Karakaya 3 Gündoğdu 1	Report	B. Vanhove 3 Mapreni 2 T. Vanhove 1	Makuhari Messe, Tokyo; Referees: Yoshinori Nii (Japan), Robert Avery (Great Britain)

28 August 2021; 19:00	Germany	2–0	Belgium	Makuhari Messe, Tokyo; Referees: Raquel Gomez Aguado (Spain), Vaida Pokvytytė (Lithuania)
28 August 2021; 19:00	Dennis 2	Report		Makuhari Messe, Tokyo; Referees: Raquel Gomez Aguado (Spain), Vaida Pokvytytė (Lithuania)

29 August 2021; 13:15	Belgium	2–4	Ukraine	Makuhari Messe, Tokyo; Referees: Yoshinori Nii (Japan), Robert Avery (Great Britain)
29 August 2021; 13:15	Mapreni 2	Report	Oliinyk 2 Zhyhalin 2	Makuhari Messe, Tokyo; Referees: Yoshinori Nii (Japan), Robert Avery (Great Britain)

== Swimming ==
Belgium have qualified two swimmers, one male and one female, to compete at the 2020 Summer Paralympics.

Men

Athlete	Event	Heats		Final	
Athlete	Event	Result	Rank	Result	Rank
Aymeric Parmentier	Men's 100m Breaststroke - SB14	1:10.12	6	Did not advance	
Tatyana Lebrun	Women's 100m Breaststroke - SB9	1:27.96	6	Did not advance	

== Table tennis ==
Belgium entered three athletes into the table tennis competition at the games. Laurens Devos & Florian Van Acker qualified from 2019 ITTF European Para Championships which was held in Helsingborg, Sweden.

Men

Athlete	Event	Preliminaries			Quarterfinals	Semifinals	Final / BM	
Athlete	Event	Opposition Result	Opposition Result	Rank	Opposition Result	Opposition Result	Opposition Result	Rank
Bart Brands	Individual C5	Cheng (TPE); L 1–3	Hunter-Spivey (GBR); L 1–3	3	Did not advance			
Laurens Devos	Individual C9	Perez Gonzalez (ESP); W 3–0	Leibovitz (USA); W 3–0	1 Q	Agunbiade (NGR); W 3–0	Nozdrunov (RPC); W 3–0	Ma (AUS); W 3–1	1st place, gold medalist(s)
Florian Van Acker	Individual C11	Takemori (JPN); W 3–2	Martinez Barreto (VEN); W 3–0	1 Q	Chang (KOR); W 3–1	Von Einem (AUS); L 2–3	Did not advance	3rd place, bronze medalist(s)

== Wheelchair tennis ==
Belgium qualified two players entries for wheelchair tennis. All of them qualified by the world rankings.

Athlete	Event	Round of 64	Round of 32	Round of 16	Quarterfinals	Semifinals	Final / BM	
Athlete	Event	Opposition Result	Opposition Result	Opposition Result	Opposition Result	Opposition Result	Opposition Result	Rank
Joachim Gérard	Men's singles	Bye	Ratzlaff (USA); W 6–1, 6–1	Caverzaschi (ESP); L 3–6, 4–6	Did not advance			
Jef Vandorpe	Men's singles	Langmann (AUT); W 6–4, 6–1	Weekes (AUS); W 3–6, 6–1, 6–0	Fernández (ARG); L 2–6, 1–6	Did not advance			
Joachim Gérard & Jef Vandorpe	Men's doubles	—N/a	Bye	Carneiro Silva/Rodrigues (BRA); W 6–3, 6–1	Hewett/Reid (GBR); L 2–6, 2–6	Did not advance		

== See also ==
- Belgium at the Paralympics
- Belgium at the 2020 Summer Olympics
