= Belgium at the 1996 Summer Paralympics =

- IPC code: BEL
- NPC: Belgian Paralympic Committee
- Website: www.paralympic.be

in Atlanta
- Competitors: 38 (32 men and 6 women)
- Medals Ranked 22nd: Gold 8 Silver 10 Bronze 7 Total 25

Summer Paralympics appearances (overview)
- 1960; 1964; 1968; 1972; 1976; 1980; 1984; 1988; 1992; 1996; 2000; 2004; 2008; 2012; 2016; 2020; 2024

38 athletes (32 men and 6 women) from Belgium competed at the 1996 Summer Paralympics in Atlanta, United States.

== Medallists ==
Medal	Name	Sport	Event
Gold	Steve Orens	Athletics	Men's 800m T52
Gold	Gino de Keersmaeker	Athletics	Men's discus F42
Gold	Thierry Daubresse	Athletics	Men's shot put F42
Gold	Marianne van Brussel	Athletics	Women's javelin F10-11
Gold	Guy Culot	Cycling	Mixed 1500m time trial tricycle CP2
Gold	Carine van Puyvelde	Swimming	100m breaststroke B2
Gold	Carine van Puyvelde	Swimming	200m breaststroke B2
Gold	Ingrid Borre	Table tennis	Women's singles 6-8
Silver	Steve Orens	Athletics	Men's 5000m T52-53
Silver	Steve Orens	Athletics	Men's 10000m T52-53
Silver	Alex Hermans	Athletics	Men's shot put F35
Silver	Kurt van Raefelghem	Athletics	Men's pentathlon P12
Silver	Guy Culot	Cycling	Mixed 5000m time trial tricycle CP2
Silver	Sebastian Xhrouet	Swimming	Men's 200m medley SM6
Silver	Sebastian Xhrouet	Swimming	Men's 400m freestyle S7
Silver	Sabrina Bellavia	Swimming	Women's 50m freestyle S9
Silver	Dimitri Ghion	Table tennis	Men's open 1-5
Silver	Ingrid Borre	Table tennis	Women's open 6-10
Bronze	Benny Govaerts	Athletics	Men's 5000m T34-37
Bronze	Kurt van Raefelghem	Athletics	Men's long jump F12
Bronze	Paul Driesen	Boccia	Mixed individual C1 wad
Bronze	Sabrina Bellavia	Swimming	Women's 100m freestyle S9
Bronze	Sabrina Bellavia	Swimming	Women's 400m freestyle S9
Bronze	Dimitri Ghion; Alain Ledoux; Jean-Marc Pletinckx	Table tennis	Men's teams 4-5
Bronze	Marie-Line Pollet	Table tennis	Women's singles 3

== See also ==
- Belgium at the Paralympics
- Belgium at the 1996 Summer Olympics
