= Belgium at the 2016 Summer Paralympics =

- IPC code: BEL
- NPC: Belgian Paralympic Committee
- Website: www.paralympic.be

in Rio de Janeiro
- Competitors: 29 in 6 sports
- Medals Ranked 25th: Gold 5 Silver 3 Bronze 3 Total 11

Summer Paralympics appearances (overview)
- 1960; 1964; 1968; 1972; 1976; 1980; 1984; 1988; 1992; 1996; 2000; 2004; 2008; 2012; 2016; 2020; 2024

Belgium competed at the 2016 Summer Paralympics in Rio de Janeiro, Brazil, from 7 to 18 September 2016.

== Medalists ==
The following Belgian competitors won medals at the games. In the by discipline sections below, medalists' names are bolded.

Medal	Name	Sport	Event	Date
Gold	Laurens Devos	Table tennis	Men's individual Class 9	September 11
Gold	Florian Van Acker	Table tennis	Men's individual Class 11	September 12
Gold	Peter Genyn	Athletics	Men's 100 metres T51	September 13
Gold	Michele George	Equestrian	Individual freestyle test grade IV	September 16
Gold	Peter Genyn	Athletics	Men's 400 metres T51	September 17
Silver	Marieke Vervoort	Athletics	Women's 400 metres T52	September 10
Silver	Michele George	Equestrian	Individual championship test grade IV	September 14
Silver	Kris Bosmans	Cycling	Men's road race C1–3	September 16
Bronze	Joachim Gerard	Wheelchair tennis	Men's singles	September 16
Bronze	Christophe Hindricq; Jean-François Deberg; Jonas van de Steene	Cycling	Mixed team relay	September 16
Bronze	Marieke Vervoort	Athletics	Women's 100 metres T52	September 17

== Administration ==
Olek Kazimirowski served as Chef de Mission.

== Disability classifications ==
Every participant at the Paralympics has their disability grouped into one of five disability categories; amputation, the condition may be congenital or sustained through injury or illness; cerebral palsy; wheelchair athletes, there is often overlap between this and other categories; visual impairment, including blindness; Les autres, any physical disability that does not fall strictly under one of the other categories, for example dwarfism or multiple sclerosis. Each Paralympic sport then has its own classifications, dependent upon the specific physical demands of competition. Events are given a code, made of numbers and letters, describing the type of event and classification of the athletes competing. Some sports, such as athletics, divide athletes by both the category and severity of their disabilities, other sports, for example swimming, group competitors from different categories together, the only separation being based on the severity of the disability.

== Athletics ==
Men
Track & road events

Athlete	Event	Final	
Athlete	Event	Result	Rank
Peter Genyn	100 metres T51	21.15 PR	1st place, gold medalist(s)
Peter Genyn	400 metres T51	1:20.82 PR	1st place, gold medalist(s)
Basile Meunier	1500 metres T38	4:54.77	7

Women
Track & road events

Athlete	Event	Heat		Final	
Athlete	Event	Result	Rank	Result	Rank
Livia de Clercq	100 metres T42	19.85	11	did not advance	
Joyce Lefevre	100 metres T34	—N/a		21.02	8
Joyce Lefevre	400 metres T34	—N/a		DSQ	
Marieke Vervoort	100 metres T52	—N/a		20.12 SB	3rd place, bronze medalist(s)
Marieke Vervoort	400 metres T52	—N/a		1:07.62	2nd place, silver medalist(s)

Field events

Athlete	Event	Final	
Athlete	Event	Distance	Position
Livia de Clercq	Long jump T42	2.99	9

== Boccia ==
Belgium qualified for the 2016 Summer Paralympics in this sport at the Guilford hosted 2015 Boccia European Team And Pairs Championships, London in the BC3 Pair event. They claimed gold ahead of silver medalist Greece and bronze medalists Spain. They scored 7 - 1 against Spain in the gold medal match.

Athlete	Event	Group Stage				Quarterfinals	Semifinals	Final	
Athlete	Event	Opposition Result	Opposition Result	Opposition Result	Rank	Opposition Result	Opposition Result	Opposition Result	Rank
Pieter Cilissen	Individual BC3	Ntenta (GRE); L 1–6	Ho Y K (HKG); L 3–4	—N/a	3	did not advance			
Kenneth Verwimp	Individual BC3	Kim H-s (KOR); L 2–3	Bussiere (CAN); W 7–2	—N/a	2	did not advance			
Pieter Cilissen; Kirsten de Laender; Kenneth Verwimp	Pairs BC3	Brazil; L 2–4	South Korea; L 3–7	Canada; W 7–0	3	—N/a	did not advance		

== Cycling ==
With one pathway for qualification being one highest ranked NPCs on the UCI Para-Cycling male and female Nations Ranking Lists on 31 December 2014, Belgium qualified for the 2016 Summer Paralympics in Rio, assuming they continued to meet all other eligibility requirements.

=== Road ===
Men

Athlete	Event	Time	Rank
Kris Bosmans	Road race C1–3	1:49:11	2nd place, silver medalist(s)
Tim Celen	Road race T1–2	54:23	6
Tim Celen	Road time trial T1–2	27:03.03	10
Jean-François Deberg	Road race H3	1:33:17	4
Jean-François Deberg	Road time trial H3	30:53.37	7
Christophe Hindricq	Road race H2	1:23:14	5
Christophe Hindricq	Road time trial H2	36:30.00	5
Diederick Schelfhout	Road race C1–3	DNF	
Diederick Schelfhout	Road time trial C3	43:53.07	12
Jonas van de Steene	Road race H4	1:28:57	5
Jonas van de Steene	Road time trial H4	30:32.66	10
Jean-François Deberg; Christophe Hindricq; Jonas van de Steene	Mixed team relay	34:02	3rd place, bronze medalist(s)

Women

Athlete	Event	Time	Rank
Griet Hoet; Guide: Anneleen Monsieur	Road race B	2:19:11	14
Griet Hoet; Guide: Anneleen Monsieur	Time trial B	43:34.20	15

=== Track ===
Pursuit

Athlete	Event	Qualification		Final	
Athlete	Event	Time	Rank	Opponent Results	Rank
Kris Bosmans	Men's individual pursuit C3	3:48.308	7	did not advance	
Diederick Schelfhout	Men's individual pursuit C3	3:55.645	9	did not advance	
Griet Hoet; Guide: Anneleen Monsieur	Women's individual pursuit B	3:40.770	7	did not advance	

Time trial

Athlete	Event	Time	Rank
Kris Bosmans	Men's 1 km time trial C1–3	1:12.583	10
Diederick Schelfhout	Men's 1 km time trial C1–3	1:13.668	12
Griet Hoet; Guide: Anneleen Monsieur	Women's 1 km time trial B	1:12.402	8

== Equestrian ==
The country qualified to participate in the team event at the Rio Games.

Athlete	Horse	Event	Score	Rank
Michele George	FBW Rainman	Individual championship test grade IV	74.333	2nd place, silver medalist(s)
Michele George	FBW Rainman	Individual freestyle test grade IV	76.300	1st place, gold medalist(s)
Barbara Minneci	Barilla	Individual championship test grade II	66.714	12
Eveline Van Looveren	Exelent	Individual championship test grade Ia	67.565	17
Ciska Vermeulen	Rohmeo	Individual championship test grade IV	68.000	6
Michele George; Barbara Minneci; Eveline Van Looveren; Ciska Vermeulen	See above	Team	422.834	2nd place, silver medalist(s)

== Swimming ==
Men

Athlete	Event	Heats		Final	
Athlete	Event	Result	Rank	Result	Rank
Sven Decaesstecker	400m freestyle S10	4:25.14	14	did not advance	
Sven Decaesstecker	200m individual medley SM10	2:16.16	8 Q	2:16.94	7
Maarten Libin	100m breaststroke SB6	1:31.22	9	did not advance	
Yannick Vandeput	200m freestyle S14	2:08.41	16	did not advance	
Yannick Vandeput	100m backstroke S14	1:06.83	9	did not advance	

Women

Athlete	Event	Heats		Final	
Athlete	Event	Result	Rank	Result	Rank
Michelle Franssen	200m freestyle S14	2:20.52	6 Q	2:19.91	7
Michelle Franssen	100m breaststroke SB14	1:23.17	6 Q	1:22.73	6
Michelle Franssen	200m individual medley SM14	2:37.31	5 Q	2:36.54	5

== Table tennis ==
Men

Athlete	Event	Group Stage			Round 1	Quarterfinals	Semifinals	Final	
Athlete	Event	Opposition Result	Opposition Result	Rank	Opposition Result	Opposition Result	Opposition Result	Opposition Result	Rank
Marc Ledoux	Individual C8	Bouvais (FRA); W 3–1	McKibbin (GBR); L 1–3	3	—N/a	did not advance			
Mathieu Loicq	Individual C8	Zhao S (CHN); L 1–3	Csejtey (SVK); L 2–3	3	—N/a	did not advance			
Laurens Devos	Individual C9	Iwabuchi (JPN); W 3–0	Shchepanskyy (UKR); W 3–0	1 Q	—N/a	Leibovitz (USA); W 3–0	Pérez (ESP); W 3–0	Last (NED); W 3–0	1st place, gold medalist(s)
Florian Van Acker	Individual C11	Song B-j (KOR); W 3–1	Takemori (JPN); W 3–1	1 Q	—N/a	Creange (FRA); W 3–1	Palos (HUN); W 3–0	von Einem (AUS); W 3–2	1st place, gold medalist(s)
Marc Ledoux; Mathieu Loicq	Team C6–8	—N/a			Great Britain; L 0–2	did not advance			

== Wheelchair tennis ==
Belgium qualified two competitors in the men's single event. Joachim Gerard qualified via the standard route. Mike Denayer qualified via a Doubles World Ranking Allocation place.

Men

Athlete	Event	Round of 64	Round of 32	Round of 16	Quarterfinals	Semifinals	Final / BM	
Athlete	Event	Opposition Score	Opposition Score	Opposition Score	Opposition Score	Opposition Score	Opposition Score	Rank
Mike Denayer	Singles	Wallin (SWE); L 2–6, 2–6	did not advance					
Joachim Gerard	Singles	bye	McCarroll (GBR); W 6–1, 6–4	Jeremiasz (FRA); W 6–0, 6–0	Kunieda (JPN); W 6–3, 6–3	Hewett (GBR); L 5–7, 3–6	Houdet (FRA); W 6–4, 6–2	3rd place, bronze medalist(s)
Mike Denayer; Joachim Gerard	Doubles	—N/a	Bye	Caverzaschi / de la Puente (ESP); L 5–7, 7–6^{4}, 2–6	did not advance			

== See also ==
- Belgium at the 2016 Summer Olympics
