= Belgium at the Paralympics =

- IPC code: BEL
- NPC: Belgian Paralympic Committee
- Website: www.paralympic.be
- Medals Ranked 27th: Gold 88 Silver 93 Bronze 92 Total 273

Summer appearances
- 1960; 1964; 1968; 1972; 1976; 1980; 1984; 1988; 1992; 1996; 2000; 2004; 2008; 2012; 2016; 2020; 2024

Winter appearances
- 1976; 1980; 1984; 1988; 1992; 1994; 1998–2002; 2006; 2010; 2014; 2018; 2022

Belgium made its Paralympic Games début at the inaugural Paralympic Games in Rome in 1960, and has participated in every edition of the Summer Paralympics. It also took part in the inaugural Winter Paralympics in 1976 in Örnsköldsvik, and has competed in every edition of the Winter Games except 1980, 1998 and 2002.

Belgian athletes have won a total of 98 Paralympic medals, of which 27 gold, 37 silver and 34 bronze, placing it 25th on the all-time Paralympic Games medal table.

Belgium's best result at the Summer Games came in 1984, when it finished 12th on the medal table, with its largest ever haul of medals: 57, of which 22 gold. Its worst result came in 2008, with just one bronze medal, placing it 69th on the medal table.

At the Winter Games, Belgium has won two bronze medals: a bronze obtained by Willy Mercier in the Men's Super-G (B1 category) in alpine skiing in 1994 and Eléonor Sana won a bronze medal in the women's visually impaired downhill in 2018.

== Medals ==
All-time Paralympic Games medal table

=== Summer Paralympic Games ===
Event	Gold	Silver	Bronze	Total	Ranking
(Italy) 1960 Rome	1	1	1	3	14th
(Japan) 1964 Tokyo	1	0	2	3	14th
(Israel) 1968 Tel Aviv	0	3	3	6	20th
(West Germany) 1972 Heidelberg	1	1	2	4	23rd
(Canada) 1976 Toronto	7	7	8	22	17th
(Netherlands) 1980 Arnhem	13	12	17	42	13th
(United States) 1984 New York City (United Kingdom) 1984 Stoke Mandeville	21	23	14	58	13th
(South Korea) 1988 Seoul	15	18	8	41	17th
(Spain) 1992 Barcelona	5	5	7	17	21st
(United States) 1996 Atlanta	8	10	7	25	22nd
(Australia) 2000 Sydney	1	4	4	9	42nd
(Greece) 2004 Athens	3	2	2	7	36th
(China) 2008 Beijing	0	0	1	1	69th
(United Kingdom) 2012 London	3	1	3	7	36th
(Brazil) 2016 Rio de Janeiro	5	3	3	11	25th
(Japan) 2020 Tokyo	4	3	8	15	31st
(France) 2024 Paris	7	4	3	14	20th
Total	95	97	93	285	25th

=== Winter Paralympic Games ===
Event	Gold	Silver	Bronze	Total	Ranking
(Sweden) 1976 Örnsköldsvik	0	0	0	0	—
(Austria) 1984 Innsbruck	0	0	0	0	—
(Austria) 1988 Innsbruck	0	0	0	0	—
(France) 1992 Tignes-Albertville	0	0	0	0	—
(Norway) 1994 Lillehammer	0	0	1	1	22nd
(Japan) 1998 Nagano	did not compete				
(United States) 2002 Salt Lake City	did not compete				
(Italy) 2006 Turin	0	0	0	0	—
(Canada) 2010 Vancouver	0	0	0	0	—
(Russia) 2014 Sochi	0	0	0	0	—
(South Korea) 2018 Pyeongchang	0	0	1	1	25th
(China) 2022 Beijing	0	0	0	0	—
(Italy) 2026 Milan and Cortina d'Ampezzo					
Total	0	0	2	2	32

== Multi medallists ==
Belgian multi medallists who have won at least three medals.

No.	Athlete	Sport	Years	Games	Gender	Gold	Silver	Bronze	Total
1	Paul Van Winkel	Athletics	1980-1988	3	F	7	4	1	12
2	Michèle George	Equestrian	2012-2024	4	F	7	1	0	8
3	Alex Hermans	Athletics	1980-2000	6	M	6	1	1	8
4	Benny Govaerts	Athletics	1988-2004	5	M	4	1	2	7
5	Peter Genyn	Athletics	2016-2024	3	M	3	2	1	6
6	Ingrid Borre	Table tennis	1984-1996	4	F	3	2	0	5
7	Laurens Devos	Table tennis	2016-2024	3	M	3	0	0	3
8	Kurt Van Raefelghem	Athletics	1992-2004	4	M	1	2	2	5
9	Gino De Keersmaeker	Athletics	1996-2008	4	M	1	2	0	3
9	Steve Orens	Athletics	1996-2000	2	M	1	2	0	3
11	Ewoud Vromant	Cycling	2020-2024	2	M	0	3	0	3
12	Alain Ledoux	Table tennis	1984-1996	4	M	0	0	3	3

== See also ==
- Belgium at the Olympics
