= Belgium at the 2000 Summer Paralympics =

- IPC code: BEL
- NPC: Belgian Paralympic Committee
- Website: www.paralympic.be

in Sydney
- Competitors: 30 (25 on foot, 5 on wheelchair)
- Medals Ranked 42nd: Gold 1 Silver 4 Bronze 4 Total 9

Summer Paralympics appearances (overview)
- 1960; 1964; 1968; 1972; 1976; 1980; 1984; 1988; 1992; 1996; 2000; 2004; 2008; 2012; 2016; 2020; 2024

There were 5 on wheelchair and 25 on foot athletes representing the country at the 2000 Summer Paralympics.

== Medal table ==
Medal	Name	Sport	Event
Gold	Kurt van Raefelghem	Athletics	Men's pentathlon P13
Silver	Benny Govaerts	Athletics	Men's 5000m T38
Silver	Gino de Keersmaeker	Athletics	Men's discus F42
Silver	Francis de Baerdemaeker	Equestrian	Mixed dressage championship grade II
Silver	Sabrina Bellavia	Swimming	Women's 100m breaststroke SB8
Bronze	Benny Govaerts	Athletics	Men's 1500m T37
Bronze	Alex Hermans	Athletics	Men's shot put F36
Bronze	Thierry Daubresse	Athletics	Men's shot put F42
Bronze	Sabrina Bellavia	Swimming	Women's 50m freestyle S9

== See also ==
- Belgium at the 2000 Summer Olympics
- Belgium at the Paralympics

== Bibliography ==
- International Paralympic Committee (2000). "Appendix C: Athlete Numbers - By Delegation". Sydney 2000 Paralympic Games Post Games Report. Sydney.
