= Belgium at the 2012 Summer Paralympics =

- IPC code: BEL
- NPC: Belgian Paralympic Committee
- Website: www.paralympic.be

in London
- Competitors: 42 in 9 sports
- Medals Ranked 36th: Gold 3 Silver 1 Bronze 3 Total 7

Summer Paralympics appearances (overview)
- 1960; 1964; 1968; 1972; 1976; 1980; 1984; 1988; 1992; 1996; 2000; 2004; 2008; 2012; 2016; 2020; 2024

Belgium competed at the 2012 Summer Paralympics in London, United Kingdom from August 29 to September 9, 2012.

== Athletics ==
Men

Athlete	Events	Final	
Athlete	Events	Result	Rank
Gino De Keersmaeker	F42 Discus throw	40.17	6
Frederic Van den Heede	T46 Marathon	2.31.38 PR	3rd place, bronze medalist(s)

Women

Athlete	Events	Heat		Semifinal		Final	
Athlete	Events	Time	Rank	Time	Rank	Time	Rank
Marieke Vervoort	T52 100 m	—N/a				19.69 PR	1st place, gold medalist(s)
Marieke Vervoort	T52 200 m	—N/a				34.83 RR	2nd place, silver medalist(s)

== Boccia ==
Athlete	Event	Seeding matches		Round of 32	Round of 16	Quarterfinals	Semifinals	Final / BM	
Athlete	Event	Opposition Score	Rank	Opposition Score	Opposition Score	Opposition Score	Opposition Score	Opposition Score	Rank
Pieter Cilissen	Mixed individual BC3	—N/a		K Kato (JPN); W 5-1	Kim H-S (KOR); L 2-5	Did not advance			
Kirsten De Laender	Mixed individual BC3	—N/a		—N/a	S Pena (ESP); W 8-2	J Macedo (POR); L 1-4	Did not advance		
Pieter Cilissen; Kirsten De Laender; Pieter Verlinden	Mixed pairs BC3	Thailand W 7-1; Spain W 12-1; Portugal W 3-2	1 Q	—N/a			Greece; L 0-7	South Korea; W 4-3	3rd place, bronze medalist(s)

== Cycling ==
=== Road ===
Athlete	Event	Time	Rank
Kris Bosmans	Men's Road race C1-3	1:42:51	5
Koen Reyserhove	Men's Road race C4-5	DNF	
Koen Reyserhove	Men's Time trial C4	37:15.51	12
Christophe Hindricq	Men's Road race H1	1:55:06	4
Christophe Hindricq	Men's Time trial H1	39:46.68	7
Wim Decleir	Men's Road race H4	2:00:35	3rd place, bronze medalist(s)
Wim Decleir	Men's Time trial H4	26:24.00	4

=== Track ===
Time Trial

Athlete	Event	Time	Rank
Kris Bosmans	Men's C1-3 Kilometre	1:12.825	14
Koen Reyserhove	Men's C4-5 Kilometre	1:14.689	19

Pursuit

Athlete	Event	Qualification		Final	
Athlete	Event	Time	Rank	Opponent Results	Rank
Kris Bosmans	Men's C3 Pursuit	3:52.453	10	Did not advance	
Koen Reyserhove	Men's C4 Pursuit	5:27.624	14	Did not advance	

== Equestrian ==
Individual

Athlete	Horse	Event	Total	
Athlete	Horse	Event	Score	Rank
Ulricke Dekeyzer	Cleverboy van d'Abel	Individual championship test grade IV	68.000	8
Ulricke Dekeyzer	Cleverboy van d'Abel	Individual freestyle test grade IV	69.550	9
Michèle George	Rainman	Individual championship test grade IV	77.065	1st place, gold medalist(s)
Michèle George	Rainman	Individual freestyle test grade IV	82.100	1st place, gold medalist(s)
Barbara Minneci	Barilla	Individual championship test grade II	70.095	8
Barbara Minneci	Barilla	Individual freestyle test grade II	73.100	6
Ciska Vermeulen	Whooney Tunes	Individual championship test grade IV	71.613	4
Ciska Vermeulen	Whooney Tunes	Individual freestyle test grade IV	75.000	5

Team

Athlete	Horse	Event	Test round		Final round		Total	
Athlete	Horse	Event	Score	Rank	Score	Rank	Score	Rank
Barbara Minneci	See above	II Team	68.571	5				
Ulricke Dekeyzer	See above	IV Team	68.625	6				
Michèle George	See above	IV Team	72.906	2				
Ciska Vermeulen	See above	IV Team	66.750	9				

== Goalball ==
=== Men's tournament ===
Squad list	Group stage		Quarterfinals	Semifinals	Finals	
Squad list	Opposition Result	Rank	Opposition Result	Opposition Result	Opposition Result	Rank
Youssef Bihi; Johan De Rick; Klison Mapreni; Bruno Vanhove; Tom Vanhove; Glenn Van Thournhout	Canada W 4–2	3 Q				
Youssef Bihi; Johan De Rick; Klison Mapreni; Bruno Vanhove; Tom Vanhove; Glenn Van Thournhout	Algeria L 2–5	3 Q				
Youssef Bihi; Johan De Rick; Klison Mapreni; Bruno Vanhove; Tom Vanhove; Glenn Van Thournhout	Iran W 8–6	3 Q				
Youssef Bihi; Johan De Rick; Klison Mapreni; Bruno Vanhove; Tom Vanhove; Glenn Van Thournhout	China D 0–0	3 Q				
Youssef Bihi; Johan De Rick; Klison Mapreni; Bruno Vanhove; Tom Vanhove; Glenn Van Thournhout	South Korea W 5–3	3 Q				

Group B

Team	Pld	W	D	L	GF	GA	GD	Pts	Qualification
Iran	5	4	0	1	32	20	+12	12	Quarterfinals
China	5	3	1	1	20	14	+6	10	Quarterfinals
Belgium	5	3	1	1	19	16	+3	10	Quarterfinals
Algeria	5	2	0	3	18	17	+1	6	Quarterfinals
South Korea	5	1	0	4	18	28	−10	3	Eliminated
Canada	5	1	0	4	16	28	−12	3	Eliminated

Source: "London 2012 Paralympic Games - Goalball results" (PDF). Paralympic.org. 2012-10-03 – via Goalball.sport.

30 August 2012; 16:15	Canada	2 – 4	Belgium	Copper Box, London; Referees: Thomas Baerz (GER) Shinji Mizuno (JPN)
30 August 2012; 16:15	Caron 2	Report	de Rick 2 Vanhove 1 Bihi 1	Copper Box, London; Referees: Thomas Baerz (GER) Shinji Mizuno (JPN)

31 August 2012; 21:00	Algeria	5 – 2	Belgium	Copper Box, London; Referees: Ali Aldarsony (KSA), Juha Vuokila (FIN)
31 August 2012; 21:00	Mokrane 3 Larbi 2	Report	de Rick 1 Bihi 1	Copper Box, London; Referees: Ali Aldarsony (KSA), Juha Vuokila (FIN)

1 September 2012; 18:30	Belgium	8 – 6	Iran	Copper Box, London; Referees: Morten Hammershoi (DEN), Juha Vuokila (FIN)
1 September 2012; 18:30	de Rick 3 Bihi 3 Vanhove 1 Mapreni 1	Report	Sayahi 3 Jafari 2 Shahbazi 1	Copper Box, London; Referees: Morten Hammershoi (DEN), Juha Vuokila (FIN)

2 September 2012; 15:00	Belgium	0 – 0	China	Copper Box, London; Referees: Hooshang Shariati (IRI), Warrick Jackes (AUS)
2 September 2012; 15:00		Report		Copper Box, London; Referees: Hooshang Shariati (IRI), Warrick Jackes (AUS)

3 September 2012; 09:00	South Korea	3 – 5	Belgium	Copper Box, London; Referees: Juha Vuokila (FIN), Morten Hammershoi (DEN)
3 September 2012; 09:00	Kim C.-H. 2 Hong 1	Report	B. Vanhove 2 Bihi 2 Mapreni 1	Copper Box, London; Referees: Juha Vuokila (FIN), Morten Hammershoi (DEN)

Quarter-final

5 September 2012; 19:30	Brazil	3 – 0	Belgium	Copper Box, London; Referees: Tony Connolly (USA), Vilma Venckutonyte (LTU)
5 September 2012; 19:30	Marques 2 Almeida Maciel Celente 1	Report		Copper Box, London; Referees: Tony Connolly (USA), Vilma Venckutonyte (LTU)

== Swimming ==
Men

Athlete	Events	Heats		Final	
Athlete	Events	Time	Rank	Time	Rank
Sven Decaesstecker	100 m backstroke S10	1:04.63	10	Did not advance	
Sven Decaesstecker	200 m individual medley SM10	2:17.51	5 Q	2:15.99	5
Yannick Vandeput	200 m freestyle S14	2:07.47	13	Did not advance	
Yannick Vandeput	100 m backstroke S14	1:09.02	15	Did not advance	
Yannick Vandeput	100 m breaststroke SB14	1:18.57	14	Did not advance	

Women

Athlete	Events	Heats		Final	
Athlete	Events	Time	Rank	Time	Rank
Tamara Medarts	200 m freestyle S14	2:30.10	15	Did not advance	
Tamara Medarts	100 m backstroke S14	1:20.61	13	Did not advance	
Tamara Medarts	100 m breaststroke SB14	1:23.51	6 Q	1:24.58	7

== Table tennis ==
Men

Athlete	Event	Preliminaries		Quarterfinals	Semifinals	Finals	
Athlete	Event	Opposition Result	Rank	Opposition Result	Opposition Result	Opposition Result	Rank
Ben Despineux	Singles class 7	C Dettoni (CHI) W 3-1; M Nikolenko (UKR) L 0-3	2	Did not advance			
Marc Ledoux	Singles class 8	P Salmin (BRA) W 3-0; M Skrzynecki (POL) L 1-3	2	Did not advance			
Mathieu Loicq	Singles class 8	A McKibbin (GBR) W 3-2; C Sun (CHN) L 0-3	2	Did not advance			
Ben Despineux; Marc Ledoux; Mathieu Loicq	Team class 6-8	France; W 3-2		Poland; L 2-3	Did not advance		

== Wheelchair rugby ==
Squad list
Ludwig Budeners
David Duquenne
Peter Genyn
Raf Hendrix
Bieke Ketelbuters
Gunther Meersschaut
Lars Mertens
Ive Theuwissen
Bob Vanacker
Ronald Verhaegen
Frederik Windey

Group stage

Team	Pld	W	D	L	GF	GA	GD	Pts	Qualification
Australia (AUS)	3	3	0	0	182	142	+40	6	Semifinals
Canada (CAN)	3	2	0	1	163	166	−3	4	Semifinals
Sweden (SWE)	3	1	0	2	151	155	−4	2	Eliminated
Belgium (BEL)	3	0	0	3	135	168	−33	0	Eliminated

5 September 2012
16:15

Sweden	52 – 42	Belgium
Uhlmann – 15; Hjert – 9 Jansson – 7 Sandberg – 6 Kulle – 5 Norlin – 4 Team – 4 Collin – 2	Report	Mertens – 20; Verhaegen – 9 Genyn – 6 Vanacker – 3 Team – 2 Budeners – 1 Meersschaut – 1

Basketball Arena
Attendance: 4,404
Referee: Motoko Izumiya (JPN), Philip Washbourn (NZL)

6 September 2012
16:15

Canada	58 – 50	Belgium
Madell – 18; Hickling – 9 Hirschfield – 9 Lavoie – 5 Chan – 4 Whitehead – 3 Simard – 3 Team – 3 Willsie – 2 Funk – 1	Report	Mertens – 24; Genyn – 10; Verhaegen – 5 Budeners – 4 Team – 4 Vanacker – 3

Basketball Arena
Attendance: 6,225
Referee: Mitch Carr (USA), Chris van de Riet (NED)

7 September 2012
10:00

Australia	58 – 43	Belgium
Batt – 29; Carr – 11; Bond – 9 Smith – 4 Hose – 1 Lees – 1 Meakin – 1 Harrison – 1 Team – 1	Report	Mertens – 14; Genyn – 11; Verhaegen – 5 Hendrix – 4 Team – 4 Budeners – 3 Vanacker – 2

Basketball Arena
Attendance: 2,822
Referee: Motoko Izumiya (JPN), Chris van de Riet (NED)

5th–8th place semi-finals

8 September 2012
14:00

Great Britain	54 – 49	Belgium
	Report

Basketball Arena
Attendance: 1,567
Referee: Pierre-Alexandre Brière (CAN), Philip Washbourn (NZL)

== Wheelchair tennis ==
Athlete	Event	Round of 64	Round of 32	Round of 16	Quarterfinals	Semifinals	Final / BM	
Athlete	Event	Opposition Score	Opposition Score	Opposition Score	Opposition Score	Opposition Score	Opposition Score	Rank
Mike Denayer	Men's singles	S Olsson (6) (SWE); L 0-6 0-6	Did not advance					
Joachim Gérard (11)	Men's singles	C Santos (BRA); W 6-3 6-2	S Welch (USA); W 7-6(4) 6-2	N Peifer (8) (FRA); W 6-3 2-6 7-5	R Vink (4) (NED); L 6(4)-7 6-2 3-6	Did not advance		
Annick Sevenans (7)	Women's singles	—N/a	H Koosz (AUT); W 6-0 6-1	Y Kamiji (JPN); L 6(3)-7 2-6	Did not advance			
Mike Denayer; Joachim Gérard	Men's doubles	—N/a	Maripa/Mathonsi (RSA); W 6-2 6-3	McCarroll/Reid (7) (GBR); L 4-6 3-6	Did not advance			
