= Belgium at the 2008 Summer Paralympics =

- IPC code: BEL
- NPC: Belgian Paralympic Committee
- Website: www.paralympic.be

in Beijing
- Competitors: 21 in 7 sports
- Flag bearer (opening): Nico Vergeylen
- Flag bearer (closing): Jan Boyen
- Medals Ranked 69th: Gold 0 Silver 0 Bronze 1 Total 1

Summer Paralympics appearances (overview)
- 1960; 1964; 1968; 1972; 1976; 1980; 1984; 1988; 1992; 1996; 2000; 2004; 2008; 2012; 2016; 2020; 2024

Belgium sent a delegation of 21 athletes (20 male, 1 female) to compete at the 2008 Summer Paralympics in Beijing. The nominated athletes are listed below with their individual classification and disciplines.

Belgium's overall result of just one bronze medal was its poorest ever at the Summer Paralympics. Its rank of 69th on the medal table was a sharp decline from four years earlier, where 3 gold medals, 2 silver and 2 bronze had placed it 36th. The 2008 Games were the first since 1968 at which Belgium failed to win at least one gold medal.

== Medallists ==
The country won one medal, a bronze.

Medal	Name	Sport	Event	Date
Bronze	Jan Boyen	Cycling	Men's Individual Track Pursuit - LC2	8th

== Athletics ==
3 competitors:

Men

Athlete	Class	Event	Heats		Semifinal		Final		
Athlete	Class	Event	Result	Rank	Result	Rank	Result	Points	Rank
Gino de Keersmaeker	F42	Shot put	N/A				11.53	-	12
Gino de Keersmaeker	F42	Discus throw	N/A				41.84	-	5
Frederic van den Heede	T46	5000 m	N/A				15:39.00	-	12
Frederic van den Heede	T46	Marathon	N/A				2:37:03	-	7

Pentathlon

Athlete	Class	Event	Long jump			Javelin throw			100 m			Discus throw			1500 m			Total	Rank
Athlete	Class	Event	Result	Points	Rank	Result	Points	Rank	Time	Points	Rank	Result	Points	Rank	Time	Points	Rank	Total	Rank
Kurt Vanraefelghem	P12	Pentathlon	6.33	659	7	44.35	505	5	12.02	647	9	33.12	526	4	4:43.32	660	8	2997	8

== Cycling ==
2 competitors:

Men

Time trials & Road races

Athlete	Class	Event	Time	Class Factor	Factorized Time	Rank
Jan Boyen	LC2	Track time trial	1:14.881	-	-	7
Jan Boyen	LC2	Road time trial	35:39.55 (+ 2:02.85)	-	-	4
Jan Boyen	LC1-2/CP4 (LC2)	Road race	1:46:03 (+ 0:00)	-	-	4
Marc Eymard	B&VI 1-3	Road time trial	33:58.30 (+ 1:57.18)	-	-	12
Marc Eymard	B&VI 1-3	Road race	2:23:17 (+ 8:33)	-	-	10

Pursuits

Athlete	Class	Event	Qualifying		Final/ Bronze medal race	
Athlete	Class	Event	Time Speed (km/h)	Rank	Opposition Time Speed (km/h)	Rank
Jan Boyen	LC2	Track pursuit	4:56.261; 48.605	3 Q	Novak (ROU); W 4:56.630; 48.545	Bronze medal

== Equestrian ==
2 competitors:

Individual

Athlete	Class	Horse	Event	Result	Rank
José Lorquet	Grade Ib	Junior du Pré	Championship Test	63.619	8
José Lorquet	Grade Ib	Junior du Pré	Freestyle Test	65.333	6
Bert Vermeir	Grade III	Tiramisu	Championship Test	64.000	7
Bert Vermeir	Grade III	Tiramisu	Freestyle Test	67.389	8

== Goalball ==
6 competitors:

Men

- Youssef Bihi (B3)
- Vincent Buisseret (B2)
- Bruno Vanhofe (B2)
- Johan de Rick (B2)
- Peter van Hout (B2)
- Danny van Eenooghe (B2)

Preliminary round - Group A

September 7
9:00

Lithuania	9 – 5	Belgium
Pavliukianec 5 Zibolis 4 (3 Penalties)	Report	Bihi 3 de Rick 2 (1 Penalty)

BIT Gymnasium, Beijing
Referee: Claude Dagenais (Canada), Keith Lound (Great Britain)

September 8
19:00

Belgium	12 – 6	Spain
Bihi 8 (1 Penalty) de Rick 3 (2 Penalties); Buisseret	Report	R. Garcia 3 Galiana; Perez (Penalty); Rubio

BIT Gymnasium, Beijing
Referee: Alexander Knecht (Germany), Aurora Zanolin (Italy)

September 9
19:00

Belgium	5 – 6	Slovenia
Bihi 2 de Rick 2 Buisseret	Report	Pirc 4 (3 Penalties); Vinkler 2

BIT Gymnasium, Beijing
Referee: Lena Bonke (Denmark), Balint Benko (Hungary)

September 10
12:00

Finland	8 – 5	Belgium
Mattila 4 (3 Penalties); Aittola 2 Posio 2	Report	de Rick 3 (3 Penalties); Bihi 2

BIT Gymnasium, Beijing
Referee: Lena Bonke (Denmark), Claude Dagenais (Canada)

September 11
9:00

Denmark	13 – 6	Belgium
Weichel 9 (5 Penalties); Nielsen 3 Pedersen (Penalty)	Report	Bihi 5 (1 Penalty); Buisseret

BIT Gymnasium, Beijing
Referee: Christl Däntler (Germany), Aurora Zanolin (Italy)

Group table

Team	Pld	W	L	D	GF	GA	GD	Pts
Slovenia (SLO)	5	5	0	0	35	24	+11	15
Lithuania (LTU)	5	4	1	0	50	18	+32	12
Denmark (DEN)	5	2	2	1	29	26	+3	7
Finland (FIN)	5	2	3	0	26	41	-15	6
Belgium (BEL)	5	1	4	0	33	42	-9	3
Spain (ESP)	5	0	4	1	20	42	-22	1

9th place match

September 12
21:00

Belgium	2 – 7	Iran
Bihi van Eenooghe	Report	Jalilvand 4 Sayahi 2 Soranji

BIT Gymnasium, Beijing
Referee: Balint Benko (Hungary), Patricia Fras (Slovenia)

== Swimming ==
2 competitors:

Men

Athlete	Class	Event	Heats		Final	
Athlete	Class	Event	Result	Rank	Result	Rank
Sven Decaesstecker	S10	100 m backstroke	1:05.44	9	did not advance	
Sven Decaesstecker	SB9	100 m breaststroke	1:14.30	7 Q	1:15.29	8
Sven Decaesstecker	SM10	200 m individual medley	2:19.57	3 Q	2:16.21	4
Kevin Lambrechts	S7	50 m butterfly	33.57	5 Q	33.80	5
Kevin Lambrechts	S7	100 m backstroke	1:20.50	9	did not advance	
Kevin Lambrechts	SM7	200 m individual medley	2:53.93	3 Q	2:54.98	6

== Table Tennis ==
3 competitors:

Men

Athlete	Class	Event	Group Match 1	Group Match 2	Group Match 3	1/8 Finals	Quarterfinals	Semifinals	Final/ Bronze medal match
Athlete	Class	Event	Opposition Result	Opposition Result	Opposition Result	Opposition Result	Opposition Result	Opposition Result	Opposition Result
Marc Ledoux	TT8	Singles	Jambor (SVK); W 3-2	Kent (CAN); W 3-0	Glikman (ISR); L 2-3	did not advance			
Mathieu Loicq	TT8	Singles	Pichon (FRA); W 3-1	Grudzien (POL); L 0-3	Hu (TPE); W 3-1	did not advance			
Nico Vergeylen	TT8	Singles	Skrzynecki (POL); L 1-3	Csonka (HUN); L 0-3	Chen (CHN); L 0-3	did not advance			
Marc Ledoux; Mathieu Loicq; Nico Vergeylen	TT6-8	Team	N/A			Bye	Israel; L 1-3	did not advance	

Dimitri Ghion, who had been nominated as a Singles player in the TT4 category, had to withdraw his start due to injury.

== Wheelchair Tennis ==
2 competitors:

Men

Athlete	Class	Event	Round of 64	Round of 32	Round of 16	Quarterfinals	Semifinals	Final
Athlete	Class	Event	Opposition Score	Opposition Score	Opposition Score	Opposition Score	Opposition Score	Opposition Score
Joachim Gérard	Open	Singles	Gergely (SVK); W 6-1, 6-0	Hinson (USA); W 6-2, 6-0	Jeremiasz (FRA); L 4-6, 1-6	did not advance		

Women

Athlete	Class	Event	Round of 32	Round of 16	Quarterfinals	Semifinals	Final
Athlete	Class	Event	Opposition Score	Opposition Score	Opposition Score	Opposition Score	Opposition Score
Annick Sevenans	Open	Singles	Martinez (COL); W 6-0, 6-0	Arnoult (USA); L 6-1, 3-6, 4-6	did not advance		

== See also ==
- 2008 Summer Paralympics
- Belgium at the Paralympics
- Belgium at the 2008 Summer Olympics
