= Belgium at the 2004 Summer Paralympics =

- IPC code: BEL
- NPC: Belgian Paralympic Committee
- Website: www.paralympic.be

in Athens
- Competitors: 25 in 7 sports
- Medals Ranked 36th: Gold 3 Silver 2 Bronze 2 Total 7

Summer Paralympics appearances (overview)
- 1960; 1964; 1968; 1972; 1976; 1980; 1984; 1988; 1992; 1996; 2000; 2004; 2008; 2012; 2016; 2020; 2024

Belgium competed at the 2004 Summer Paralympics in Athens, Greece. The team included 25 athletes, 24 men and one woman. Competitors from Belgium won 7 medals, including 3 gold, 2 silver and 2 bronze to finish 36th in the medal table.

== Medallists ==
Medal	Name	Sport	Event
Gold	Dirk Boon	Cycling	Men's tricycle time trial CP 1/2
Gold	Mathieu Loicq	Table tennis	Men's singles class 8
Gold	Marc Ledoux; Mathieu Loicq; Nico Vergeylen	Table tennis	Men's teams class 8
Silver	Gino de Keersmaeker	Athletics	Men's discus throw F42
Silver	Marc Ledoux	Table tennis	Men's singles class 8
Bronze	Kurt van Raefelghem	Athletics	Men's pentathlon P13
Bronze	Bert Vermeir	Equestrian	Mixed individual dressage grade III

== Sports ==
=== Athletics ===
==== Men's track ====
Athlete	Class	Event	Heats		Semifinal		Final	
Athlete	Class	Event	Result	Rank	Result	Rank	Result	Rank
Benny Govaerts	T37	800m	DNF		did not advance			
Benny Govaerts	T37	1500m	N/A				4:45.86	7

==== Men's field ====
Athlete	Class	Event	Final		
Athlete	Class	Event	Result	Points	Rank
Gino de Keersmaeker	F42	Discus	45.34	-	2nd place, silver medalist(s)
Gino de Keersmaeker	F42	Shot put	11.93	-	6
Kurt van Raefelghem	F12	Long jump	6.35	-	15
Kurt van Raefelghem	P13	Pentathlon	2758		3rd place, bronze medalist(s)

=== Cycling ===
==== Men's road ====
Athlete	Event	Time	Rank
Dirk Boon	Men's tricycle road race CP div 1/2	50:26	5
Dirk Boon	Men's tricycle time trial CP div 1/2	8:37.97	1st place, gold medalist(s)

=== Equestrian ===
Athlete	Event	Total	
Athlete	Event	Score	Rank
Jos Knevels	Mixed individual championship test grade IV	63.613	10
Jos Knevels	Mixed individual freestyle test grade IV	72.091	7
Bert Vermeir	Mixed individual championship test grade III	70.960	4
Bert Vermeir	Mixed individual freestyle test grade III	74.722	3rd place, bronze medalist(s)

=== Shooting ===
==== Men ====
Athlete	Event	Qualification		Final		
Athlete	Event	Score	Rank	Score	Total	Rank
Jan Boonen	Men's 10m air pistol SH1	563	5 Q	99.8	652.8	8
Jan Boonen	Mixed 25m pistol SH1	555	11	did not advance		
Jan Boonen	Mixed 50m pistol SH1	518	10	did not advance		
Luc Dessart	Mixed 10m air rifle prone SH2	596	16	did not advance		
Luc Dessart	Mixed 10m air rifle standing SH2	591	13	did not advance		
Hans Peter Stamper	Mixed 10m air rifle prone SH2	593	22	did not advance		
Hans Peter Stamper	Mixed 10m air rifle standing SH2	589	19	did not advance		

=== Swimming ===
Athlete	Class	Event	Heats		Final	
Athlete	Class	Event	Result	Rank	Result	Rank
Wim de Paepe	S9	100m freestyle	1:01.82	13	did not advance	
Wim de Paepe	S9	400m freestyle	4:38.14	6 Q	4:37.52	6
Sven Decaesstecker	S10	100m backstroke	1:09.63	7 Q	1:07.83	6
Sven Decaesstecker	SB9	100m breaststroke	1:14.54	5 Q	1:14.12	5
Sven Decaesstecker	SM10	200m individual medley	2:25.72	5 Q	2:24.03	6
Jonas Martens	S9	50m freestyle	27.97	8 Q	27.84	7
Jonas Martens	S9	100m freestyle	1:02.16	14	did not advance	
Jonas Martens	S9	100m backstroke	1:10.57	10	did not advance	

=== Table tennis ===
==== Men ====
Athlete	Event	Preliminaries				Round of 16	Quarterfinals	Semifinals	Final / BM	
Athlete	Event	Opposition Result	Opposition Result	Opposition Result	Rank	Opposition Result	Opposition Result	Opposition Result	Opposition Result	Rank
Dimitri Ghion	Men's singles 4	Martin (FRA); W 3–1	Lis (POL); W 3–0	Park (KOR); W 3–2	1 Q	N/A	Stefanu (CZE); L 1–3	did not advance		
Marc Ledoux	Men's singles 8	Soukup (CZE); W 3-0	Lo (USA); W 3-2	du Plooy (RSA); W 3-0	1 Q	Bye	Schaller (FRA); W 3-2	Csejtey (SVK); W 3-1	Loicq (BEL); L 0-3	2nd place, silver medalist(s)
Mathieu Loicq	Men's singles 8	Csejtey (SVK); L 0-3	Lee (KOR); W 3-1	Kovacic (CRO); W 3-1	2 Q	Glikman (ISR); W 3-0	Li (CHN); W 3-2	Frommelt (LIE); W 3-1	Ledoux (BEL); W 3-0	1st place, gold medalist(s)
Nico Vergeylen	Men's singles 8	Frommelt (LIE); L 0-3	Pichon (FRA); W 3-1	Csonka (HUN); L 2-3	2 Q	Csejtey (SVK); L 0-3	did not advance			
Marc Ledoux; Mathieu Loicq; Nico Vergeylen	Men's team 8	China (CHN); W 3-0	Spain (ESP); L 1-3	Czech Republic (CZE); W 3-0	1 Q	N/A		Slovakia (SVK); W 3-0	France (FRA); W 3-1	1st place, gold medalist(s)

==== Women ====
Athlete	Event	Preliminaries				Quarterfinals	Semifinals	Final / BM	
Athlete	Event	Opposition Result	Opposition Result	Opposition Result	Rank	Opposition Result	Opposition Result	Opposition Result	Rank
Myriam Muylaert	Women's singles 9	Liu (CHN); L 0–3	Kamkasomphou (FRA); L 1–3	Grzelak (POL); L 0–3	4	did not advance			

=== Wheelchair rugby ===
The men's rugby team didn't win any medals, they were 6th out of 8 teams.

==== Players ====
- Ludwig Budeners
- Koen Delen
- Peter Genyn
- Christophe Hindricq
- Lars Mertens
- Guy Michem
- Bob Vanacker
- Ronny Verhaegen

==== Tournament ====
Game	Match	Score	Rank
1	Belgium vs. Great Britain (GBR)	22 - 27	3
2	Belgium vs. Canada (CAN)	30 - 32 (OT)	3
3	Belgium vs. Germany (GER)	40 - 33	3
Quarterfinals	Belgium vs. New Zealand (NZL)	33 - 40	L
Semifinals	Belgium vs. Japan (JPN)	36 - 35	W
5th/6th classification	Belgium vs. Australia (AUS)	43 - 46	6

== See also ==
- Belgium at the Paralympics
- Belgium at the 2004 Summer Olympics
