= Athletics at the 1992 Summer Paralympics – Men's high jump B3 =

Men's high jump B3 at the IX Paralympic Games
- Paralympic Athletics
- Venue: Estadi Olímpic de Montjuïc
- Dates: September 1992
- Competitors: 8 from 5 nations

Medalists
1st place, gold medalist(s)		Jonathan Orcutt	United States
2nd place, silver medalist(s)		Enest Bliey	United States
3rd place, bronze medalist(s)		Olaf Mehlmann	Germany

The Men's high jump B3 was a field event in athletics at the 1992 Summer Paralympics, for visually impaired athletes.

== Results ==
=== Final ===
Place	Athlete	Time
1	Jonathan Orcutt (USA)	1.98
2	Enest Bliey (USA)	1.92
3	Olaf Mehlmann (GER)	1.92
3	Shigeo Yoshihara (JPN)	1.75
5	Pablo Frometa (CUB)	1.55
-	Koen Lambert (BEL)	DNS
-	Brian Peagram (USA)	DNS
-	Kurt van Raefelghem (BEL)	NM
