= Belgium at the 1980 Summer Paralympics =

- IPC code: BEL
- NPC: Belgian Paralympic Committee
- Website: www.paralympic.be

in Arnhem
- Competitors: 67
- Medals Ranked 13th: Gold 13 Silver 12 Bronze 17 Total 42

Summer Paralympics appearances (overview)
- 1960; 1964; 1968; 1972; 1976; 1980; 1984; 1988; 1992; 1996; 2000; 2004; 2008; 2012; 2016; 2020; 2024

Belgium competed at the 1980 Summer Paralympics in Arnhem, Netherlands. 67 competitors from Belgium won 42 medals including 13 gold, 12 silver and 17 bronze and finished 13th in the medal table.

== See also ==
- Belgium at the Paralympics
- Belgium at the 1980 Summer Olympics
