= Belgium at the 1968 Summer Paralympics =

- IPC code: BEL
- NPC: Belgian Paralympic Committee
- Website: www.paralympic.be

in Tel Aviv
- Medals Ranked 20th: Gold 0 Silver 3 Bronze 3 Total 6

Summer Paralympics appearances (overview)
- 1960; 1964; 1968; 1972; 1976; 1980; 1984; 1988; 1992; 1996; 2000; 2004; 2008; 2012; 2016; 2020; 2024

Belgium competed at the 1968 Summer Paralympics in Tel Aviv, Israel from November 4 to 13, 1968. The team finished twentieth in the medal table and won a total of six medals; three silver and three bronze.

== Medals ==
The team finished twentieth in the medal table and won a total of six medals; three silver and three bronze.

Competitor	Games	Sport	Event	Medal	Ref
BRUYNDONCK	Tel Aviv 1968	Table Tennis	Women's Doubles C	Bronze	
Richard De Zutter	Tel Aviv 1968	Table Tennis	Men's Doubles C	Silver	
Richard De Zutter	Tel Aviv 1968	Table Tennis	Men's Doubles C	Silver	
Lampo	Tel Aviv 1968	Swimming	Women's 50 m Breaststroke Class 5 (cauda equina)	Silver	
Lampo	Tel Aviv 1968	Table Tennis	Women's Doubles C	Bronze	
Lampo	Tel Aviv 1968	Table Tennis	Women's Singles C	Bronze	
Stevens	Tel Aviv 1968	Table Tennis	Men's Doubles C	Silver	
Wilfred van Braune	Tel Aviv 1968	Wheelchair Fencing	Men's Sabre Individual	Bronze	

== See also ==
- Belgium at the 1968 Summer Olympics
