= Athletics at the 2004 Summer Paralympics – Men's discus throw F42–46 =

Men's discus throw events for amputee athletes were held at the 2004 Summer Paralympics in the Athens Olympic Stadium. Events were held in two disability classes.

== F42 ==
Men's Discus F42 at the XII Paralympic Games
- Venue: Athens Olympic Stadium
- Dates: 22 September 2004
- Competitors: 10 from 10 nations
- Winning distance: 45.56

Medalists
1st place, gold medalist(s)		Fanie Lombaard	South Africa
2nd place, silver medalist(s)		Gino de Keersmaeker	Belgium
3rd place, bronze medalist(s)		Algirdas Tatulis	Lithuania

The F42 event was won by Fanie Lombaard, representing South Africa.

=== Result ===
22 Sept. 2004, 19:30

Rank	Athlete	Result	Notes
1st place, gold medalist(s)	Fanie Lombaard (RSA)	45.56	
2nd place, silver medalist(s)	Gino de Keersmaeker (BEL)	45.34	
3rd place, bronze medalist(s)	Algirdas Tatulis (LTU)	43.62	
4	Viktar Khilmonchyk (BLR)	42.74	
5	Pasilione Tafilagi (FRA)	41.03	
6	Klaus Kulla (GER)	38.28	
7	Mohamd Baker (IRQ)	36.99	
8	Athanasios Deligiorgis (GRE)	33.60	
9	Dechko Ovcharov (BUL)	33.09	
10	Leszek Cmikiewicz (POL)	30.81	

== F44/46 ==
Men's Discus F44/46 at the XII Paralympic Games
- Venue: Athens Olympic Stadium
- Dates: 20 September 2004
- Competitors: 12 from 12 nations
- Winning distance: 55.12

Medalists
1st place, gold medalist(s)		Daniel Greaves	Great Britain
2nd place, silver medalist(s)		Jackie Christiansen	Denmark
3rd place, bronze medalist(s)		Ha Si Lao	China

The F44/46 event was won by Daniel Greaves, representing Great Britain.

=== Result ===
20 Sept. 2004, 17:00

Rank	Athlete	Result	Points	Notes
1st place, gold medalist(s)	Daniel Greaves (GBR)	55.12	1102	WR
2nd place, silver medalist(s)	Jackie Christiansen (DEN)	51.90	1038	
3rd place, bronze medalist(s)	Ha Si Lao (CHN)	47.32	946	
4	Jeffrey Skiba (USA)	45.24	905	
5	Evgeny Gudkov (RUS)	42.18	843	
6	Urs Kolly (SUI)	41.66	833	
7	Don Elgin (AUS)	41.13	822	
8	Andis Ozolnieks (LAT)	40.46	809	
9	Harald von Koch (SWE)	38.67	773	
10	Philippe Ramon (FRA)	35.80	716	
11	Yadvendra Vashishta (IND)	33.35	667	
12	Paulo Cesasr Correira (CPV)	30.04	601	
