= Belgium at the 1984 Summer Paralympics =

- IPC code: BEL
- NPC: Belgian Paralympic Committee
- Website: www.paralympic.be

in Stoke Mandeville/New York
- Competitors: 35
- Medals Ranked 13th: Gold 21 Silver 23 Bronze 14 Total 58

Summer Paralympics appearances (overview)
- 1960; 1964; 1968; 1972; 1976; 1980; 1984; 1988; 1992; 1996; 2000; 2004; 2008; 2012; 2016; 2020; 2024

Belgium competed at the 1984 Summer Paralympics in Stoke Mandeville, Great Britain and New York City, United States. 35 competitors from Belgium won 58 medals including 21 gold, 23 silver and 14 bronze and finished 13th in the medal table.

== See also ==
- Belgium at the Paralympics
- Belgium at the 1984 Summer Olympics
