= Athletics at the 2004 Summer Paralympics – Men's pentathlon P13 =

Men's Pentathlon P13 at the XII Paralympic Games
- Venue: Athens Olympic Stadium
- Dates: 22 September 2004
- Competitors: 13 from 11 nations
- Winning points: 3017

Medalists
1st place, gold medalist(s)		Ihar Fartunau	Belarus
2nd place, silver medalist(s)		Aliaksandr Tryputs	Belarus
3rd place, bronze medalist(s)		Kurt van Raefelghem	Belgium

The Men's pentathlon P13 event for visually impaired athletes at the 2004 Summer Paralympics was held in the Athens Olympic Stadium on 22 September. It was won by Ihar Fartunau, representing Belarus.

Schedule
Long Jump	09:00
Javelin	10:30
100 metres	12:30
Discus	17:00
1500 metres	19:05

Rank	Athlete	Points	Notes
1st place, gold medalist(s)	Ihar Fartunau (BLR)	3017	
2nd place, silver medalist(s)	Aliaksandr Tryputs (BLR)	2939	
3rd place, bronze medalist(s)	Kurt van Raefelghem (BEL)	2758	
4	Yuriy Kvitkov (KAZ)	2650	
5	Roman Mesyk (UKR)	2274	
6	Norbert Holík (SVK)	2195	
7	Miloš Grlica (SCG)	1989	
8	Donko Angelov (BUL)	1369	
	Stéphane Bozzolo (FRA)	DNF	
	Marcin Wesolowski (POL)	DNF	
	Joerg Trippen (GER)	DNF	
	Miroslaw Pych (POL)	DNF	
	Albert van der Mee (NED)	DNS	
