= Belgium at the 1964 Summer Paralympics =

- IPC code: BEL
- NPC: Belgian Paralympic Committee
- Website: www.paralympic.be

in Tokyo
- Medals Ranked 14th: Gold 1 Silver 0 Bronze 2 Total 3

Summer Paralympics appearances (overview)
- 1960; 1964; 1968; 1972; 1976; 1980; 1984; 1988; 1992; 1996; 2000; 2004; 2008; 2012; 2016; 2020; 2024

Belgium sent a delegation to compete at the 1964 Summer Paralympics in Tokyo, Japan. Its athletes finished fourteenth in the overall medal count.

== Medalists ==
France and Belgium both sent one athlete each to form a team for dartchery mixed pairs open. This team finished third and a bronze medal was attributed to both countries in the medal table.

Medal	Name	Sport	Event
(gold) Gold	Y. Alloo	Table tennis	Women's Singles C
(bronze) Bronze	Raymond Schelfaut	Archery	Men's Albion Round Open
(bronze) Bronze	Raymond Schelfaut	Dartchery	Mixed pairs open

== See also ==
- 1964 Summer Paralympics medal table
- Belgium at the 1964 Summer Olympics
