= Belgium at the 1976 Summer Paralympics =

- IPC code: BEL
- NPC: Belgian Paralympic Committee
- Website: www.paralympic.be

in Toronto
- Medals Ranked 17th: Gold 7 Silver 7 Bronze 8 Total 22

Summer Paralympics appearances (overview)
- 1960; 1964; 1968; 1972; 1976; 1980; 1984; 1988; 1992; 1996; 2000; 2004; 2008; 2012; 2016; 2020; 2024

Belgium sent a delegation to compete at the 1976 Summer Paralympics in Toronto, Ontario, Canada. Its athletes finished seventeenth in the overall medal count.

== See also ==
- 1976 Summer Paralympics
- Belgium at the 1976 Summer Olympics
