= Belgium at the 1960 Summer Paralympics =

- IPC code: BEL
- NPC: Belgian Paralympic Committee
- Website: www.paralympic.be

in Rome
- Competitors: 18
- Medals Ranked 14th: Gold 1 Silver 1 Bronze 1 Total 3

Summer Paralympics appearances (overview)
- 1960; 1964; 1968; 1972; 1976; 1980; 1984; 1988; 1992; 1996; 2000; 2004; 2008; 2012; 2016; 2020; 2024

Belgium sent a delegation of 18 athletes (16 men and 2 women) to compete at the inaugural Paralympic Games in 1960 in Rome, Italy. Its athletes finished fourteenth in the overall medal count with 1 gold, 1 silver and 1 bronze medal.

The silver and the bronze medal were earned in archery, while the gold medal was won at table tennis.

== See also ==
- 1960 Summer Paralympics medal table
- Belgium at the 1960 Summer Olympics
