= Belgium at the 1988 Summer Paralympics =

- IPC code: BEL
- NPC: Belgian Paralympic Committee
- Website: www.paralympic.be

in Seoul
- Competitors: 54
- Medals Ranked 17th: Gold 15 Silver 18 Bronze 8 Total 41

Summer Paralympics appearances (overview)
- 1960; 1964; 1968; 1972; 1976; 1980; 1984; 1988; 1992; 1996; 2000; 2004; 2008; 2012; 2016; 2020; 2024

Belgium competed at the 1988 Summer Paralympics in Seoul, South Korea. 54 competitors from Belgium won 41 medals including 15 gold, 18 silver and 8 bronze and finished 17th in the medal table.

== See also ==
- Belgium at the Paralympics
- Belgium at the 1988 Summer Olympics
