= Ha Silao =

Chinese Paralympic athlete

Medal record

Track and field (athletics)

Representing China

Paralympic Games
Gold medal – first place	1996 Atlanta	Javelin Throw - F43-44
Silver medal – second place	2000 Sydney	Javelin Throw - F44
Bronze medal – third place	2004 Athens	Discus Throw - F44/46

Ha Si Lao is a paralympic athlete from China competing mainly in category F44 throwing events.

Ha Si Lao has competed at three Paralympics, winning one medal in each. His first games were in 1996 where as well as competing in the shot and discus he won the F43-44 javelin. In 2000 Summer Paralympics he again competed in all three throws and added a leg of the 4 × 100 m but only managed in winning silver in the javelin. His third appearance came in the 2004 Summer Paralympics where he again competed in all three throws and this time won a bronze medal in the discus.
