= Victor Boin =

Belgian freestyle swimmer

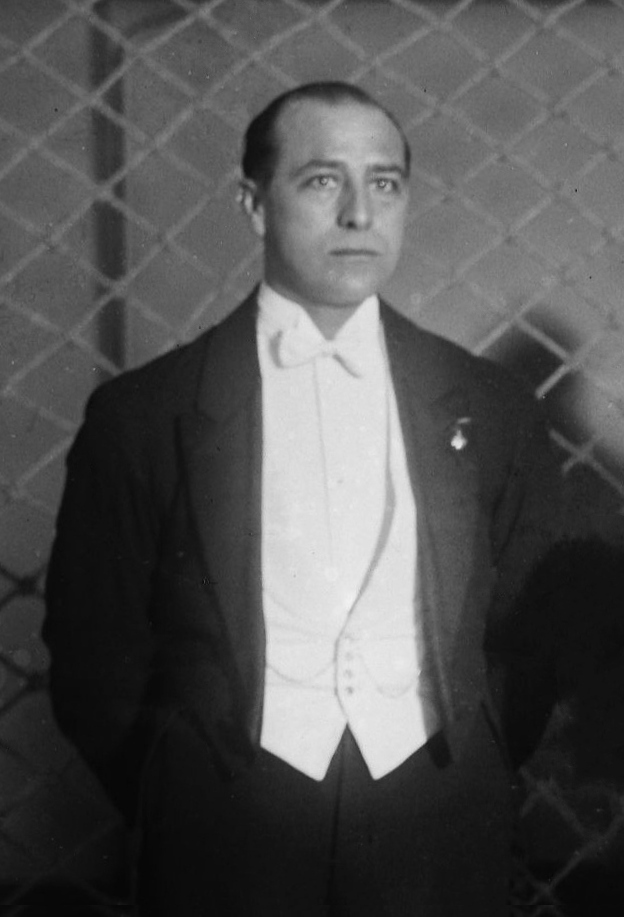
- Victor Boin in 1922

Personal information
- Born: 28 February 1886 Brussels, Belgium
- Died: 31 March 1974 (aged 88) Brussels, Belgium

Sport
- Sport: Water polo, fencing, swimming
Medal record
Representing Belgium
Olympic Games
Water polo
Silver medal – second place	1908 London	Team competition
Bronze medal – third place	1912 Stockholm	Team competition
Fencing
Silver medal – second place	1920 Antwerp	Team epée

Victor Boin (28 February 1886 – 31 March 1974) was a Belgian freestyle swimmer, water polo player, and épée fencer who competed at the 1908, 1912 and 1920 Summer Olympics.

== Olympics ==
Boin was part of the Belgian water polo teams that finished second in 1908 and third in 1912. In 1908 he also participated in the 100 metre freestyle swimming competition, but was eliminated in the first round.

As a fencer he finished fourth in the individual épée competition in 1912. In 1920 he was eliminated in the first round of the individual épée event, but won a silver medal in the team épée event.

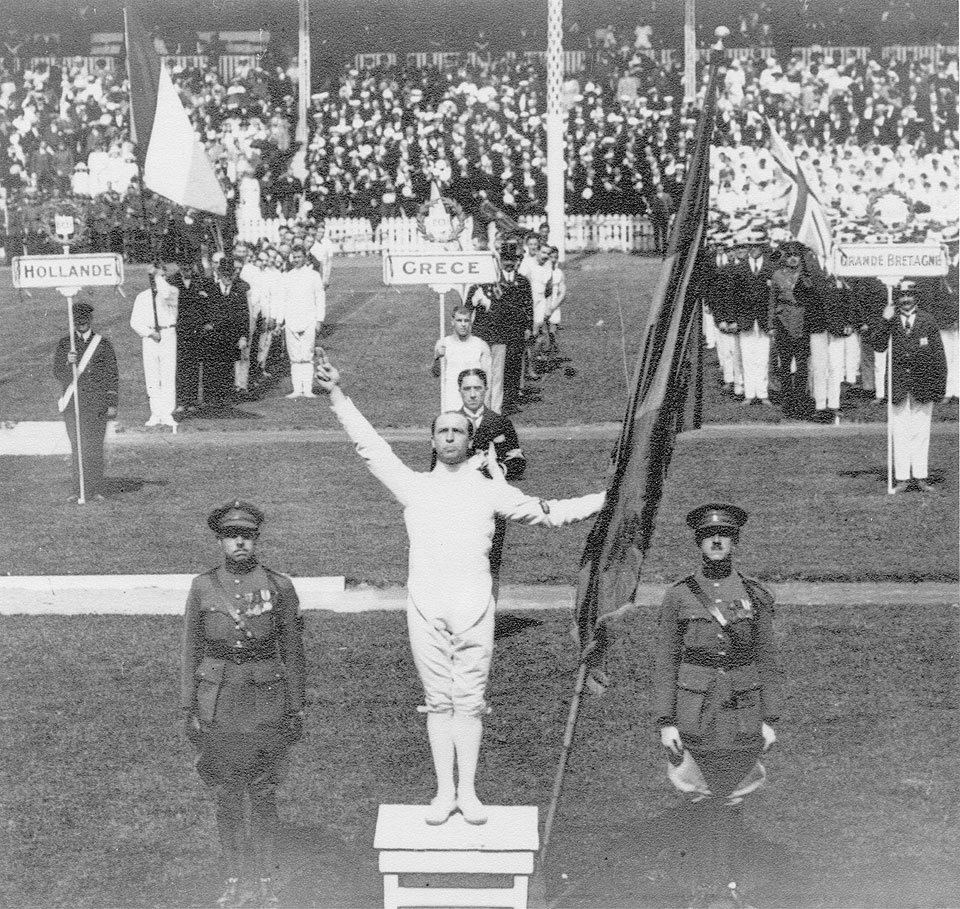
Boin delivering the first Olympic Oath, Antwerp, 1920.

Boin took the first ever Olympic Oath at the 1920 Games in Antwerp, where he was also the Belgium flag bearer at the Opening Ceremony. Later, between 1955 and 1965, he served as president of the Belgian Olympic Committee.

== Other activities ==
Boin was also active in ice skating, flying, ice hockey, and motorcycle racing. In 1903, aged 17, he founded the first Belgian ice hockey club and became its first president.

Boin worked as a sports journalist, theater critic and sports official. In 1912 he founded the Belgian Professional Association of Sports Journalists, and headed it from 1923 to 1935. In 1924 he co-founded the International Sports Journalists' Association; he served as its first vice-president, and later became its president.

During World War I he joined the Belgian Air Force, eventually becoming the personal pilot of Queen Elisabeth.

== Trophy Victor Boin ==
Victor Boin was co-founder and first president of the Belgian Paralympic Committee. In 1974, the year of his death, the Belgian Paralympic Committee created the Trophy Victor Boin in his honor. The Trophy is awarded once a year to either a Paralympic athlete in regards of his/her achievements in the previous year or to honor his entire career or to an individual for his career and/or important role in the Belgian Paralympic movement. The Trophy Victor Boin can only be won once.

== See also ==
- Belgium men's Olympic water polo team records and statistics
- List of Olympic medalists in water polo (men)

== Bibliography ==
- Duweiz, Yves (June 2000). "Victor Boin – Jacques Ochs: Deux hommes de leur temps" [Victor Boin – Jacques Ochs: Two Men of Their Time]. Avions: Toute l'Aéronautique et son histoire (in French) (87): 48–53. ISSN 1243-8650.
- Wallechinsky, David and Jaime Loucky (2008). The Complete Book of the Olympics – 2008 Edition. London: Aurum Press, Limited. pp. 607, 1050.
