= Belgium at the 1992 Summer Paralympics =

- IPC code: BEL
- NPC: Belgian Paralympic Committee
- Website: www.paralympic.be

in Barcelona
- Competitors: 73
- Medals Ranked 21st: Gold 5 Silver 5 Bronze 7 Total 17

Summer Paralympics appearances (overview)
- 1960; 1964; 1968; 1972; 1976; 1980; 1984; 1988; 1992; 1996; 2000; 2004; 2008; 2012; 2016; 2020; 2024

Belgium competed at the 1992 Summer Paralympics in Barcelona, Spain. 73 competitors from Belgium won 17 medals including 5 gold, 5 silver and 7 bronze and finished 21st in the medal table.

== See also ==
- Belgium at the Paralympics
- Belgium at the 1992 Summer Olympics
