= Frederic Van den Heede =

Belgian Paralympic athlete

Personal information
- Born: 21 March 1974 (age 52) Waregem, Belgium

Sport
- Country: Belgium
- Sport: Paralympic athletics
- Disability class: T46
- Event: long-distance races
- Club: Somival Athletics: Waregem
Medal record
Representing Belgium
Paralympic Games
Bronze medal – third place	2012 London	Marathon – T46

Frederic Van Den Heede (born 21 March 1974) is a Paralympic athlete from Belgium who won a bronze medal in the 2012 Summer Paralympics in the T46 Men's marathon.
