= Barilla (horse) =

Belgian dressage horse

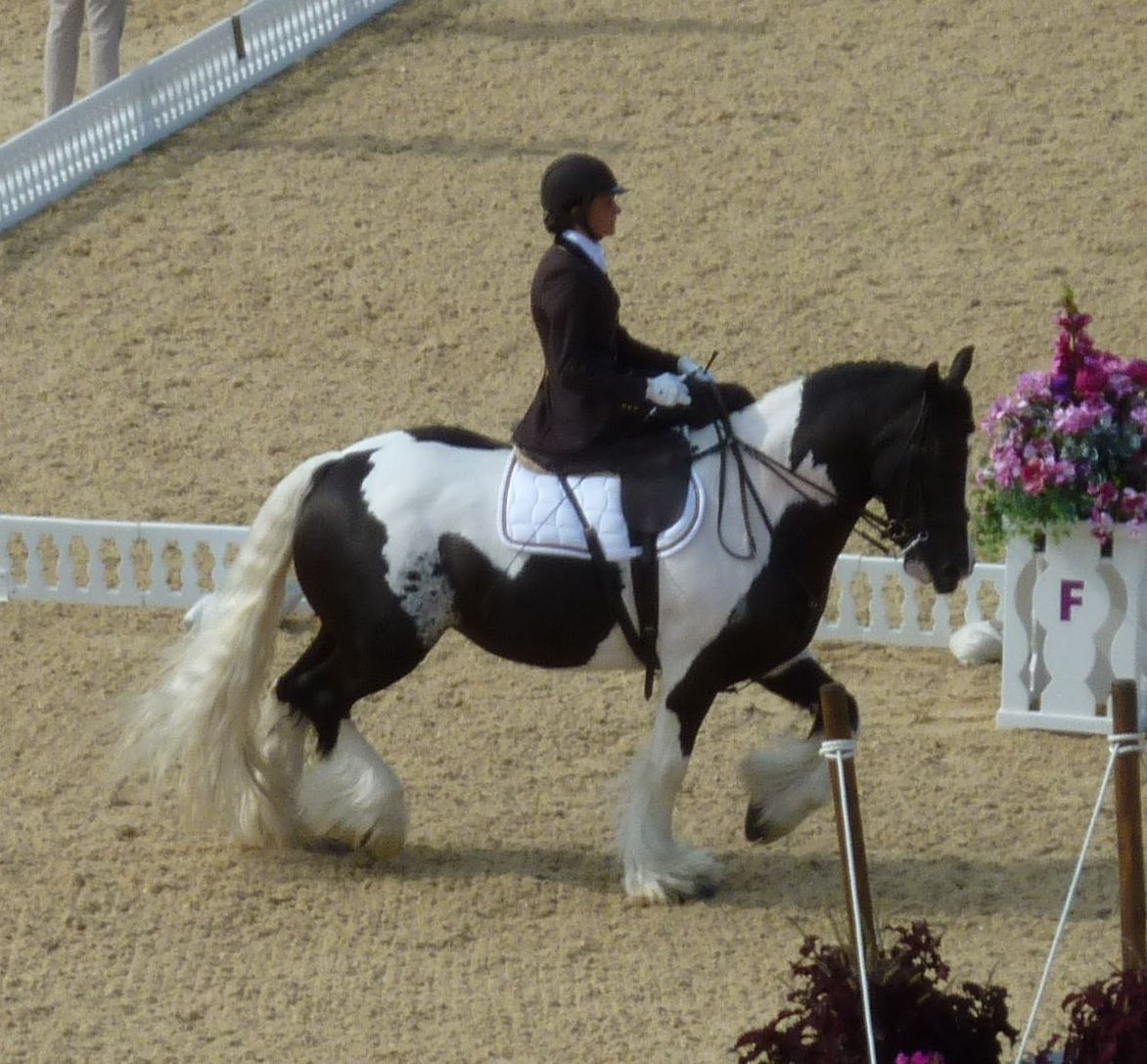
- Barbara & Barilla at the 2012 Paralympics
- Breed: Cob
- Sex: Mare
- Foaled: 2001 (age 23–24)
- Colour: Piebald

Barilla (born 2001) is a Belgian dressage horse ridden by Barbara Minneci. Barilla and Barbara competed at the 2012 Summer Paralympics in the Individual championship test grade II and Individual freestyle test grade II, coming in 8th and 6th respectively.
