= Bert Vermeir =

Belgian Paralympic equestrian

Personal information
- Full name: Bert Vermeir
- Born: 3 March 1977 (age 49) Merchtem, Belgium

Sport
- Country: Belgium
- Sport: Equestrian
- Event(s): Dressage, Jumping

Achievements and titles
- Paralympic finals: 2000, 2004, 2008
Medal record
Representing Belgium
Paralympic Games
Equestrian
Bronze medal – third place	2004 Athens	Mixed Dressage - Freestyle Grade III

Bert Vermeir (born 3 March 1977) is a Belgium Paralympic equestrian. He won a bronze medal in the 2004 Summer Paralympics.

== Biography ==
Vermeir was born in Merchtem and received a pony for his 4th birthday. However he was left paralysed in 1992 after an accident involving his pony, which led to several broken vertebrae. Vermeir's first international para-equestrian appearance was the World Cup Denmark in 1999. In 2000, he made his Paralympic debut in Sydney.

In 2004, Vermeir won Paralympic bronze in the Mixed Dressage - Freestyle Grade III riding Den Eik Heino.
