= Piotr Van Montagu =

Belgian Paralympic swimmer

Personal information
- Born: 16 October 1988 (age 37) Poland

Sport
- Sport: Para-archery
- Disability class: ST
- Club: Compagnie des Archers du Château Gerpinnes ASBL
Medal record
Para-archery
Representing Belgium

Piotr Van Montagu (born 16 October 1988) is a Belgian Paralympic archer of Polish descent. He competes in classification ST and with no arms and an impairment to his right leg has found his own way to becoming one of the best men's compound shooters in the world.

== Biography ==
Van Montagu was born in Poland into a tough familial situation, a Softenon baby without arms and a deformed right leg, and was adopted by a Belgian family at age 4. His first love was wheelchair football. He practiced it for about 13 years, at a high level, participating in several World and European Cups and was even elected the second-best player in the world in 2011 during the World Cup in Paris. Fascinated by the beauty of archery and inspired by fictional characters wielding bow and arrow, notably Legolas in "The Lord of the Rings" film series, he picked up archery in 2016. It took him nearly three years at the archery club Cardinal Mercier in Braine-l'Alleud, Belgium, before being able to shoot alone, with his feet in the manner of his idol and example, the American archer Matt Stutzman. He is a member of "the Compagnie des archers du château Gerpinnes ASBL".

== Personal ==
Van Montagu is single and lives in Montignies-sur-Sambre, a district of the municipality of Charleroi, located in the province of Hainait, Belgium.

== Competitions ==
Van Montagu has participated in multiple World and European championships and two Summer Paralympics.

He qualified for the 2020 Summer Paralympics in Tokyo, Japan by finishing runner-up in the Para-Archery World Ranking Tournament And Final Paralympic Qualification for Tokyo 2021 in Nové Město, Czech Republic. In Tokyo, he finished 9th in the men's individual compound open.

His best result at a World Para Archery Championship was 4th place in the Men's Individual Compound Open at the 2023 World Para Archery Championships in July 2023 in Plzeň, Czech Republic, that also offered Belgium a quota spot for the 2024 Summer Olympics. En route to the semi-final, Van Montagu eliminated in the round of sixteen his idol and global icon of the sport, Matt Stutzman who had not lost to another armless archer in 13 years.

His best result at a European Para-Archery Championships came 3 weeks later, a 5th place in the Men's Individual Compound Open at the 2023 European Para Championships in Rotterdam, the Netherlands.

In 2024, he won the Para-Archery European Cup.

The most embarrassing moment of his career came in a match against his very idol Matt Stutzman in Dubai in February 2022, when he shot an arrow in Stutzman's target and obviously lost the match.
