= Kevin Van Ham =

Belgian Paralympic equestrian (born 1989)

Personal information
- Nationality: Belgian
- Discipline: Para-dressage
- Born: 22 July 1989 (age 36)
- Horse: Eros Van Ons Heem
Medal record
Para-equestrian
Representing Belgium

Kevin Van Ham (born 22 July 1989) is a Belgian paralympic equestrian competing in Test Grade V.

== Early life ==
Van Ham was born with a piece of his left forearm missing. He has been riding horses since he was 12.

== Career ==
Van Ham started out in the able-bodied Dressage circuit and switched to para-dressage in 2017.

Van Ham participated in his first international para-competition in 2018 and a year later he recorded his first scores above 70% at the CPEDI (Concours Para Équestre de Dressage International) competitions in Uberhernn (Germany) and Stadl-Paura (Austria) with his horse Eros Van Ons Heem.

Van Ham first represented Belgium in an international competition in the Para-dressage events at the 2019 FEI European Championships in Rotterdam, The Netherlands, where he finished fifth in both the Individual Test Grade V and the Freestyle Test Grade V.

Van Ham was selected for both the 2020 and 2024 Summer Paralympics. In Tokyo, Japan he finished 7th in the Individual Test Grade V and 8th in the Freestyle Test Grade V. In Paris, France he did better in both disciplines, finishing 6th in the Individual Test Grade V and 5th in the Freestyle Test Grade V.

In 2020 he participated in his first FEI World Championships in Herning, Denmark finishing 4th in the Individual Test Grade V and 7th in the Freestyle Test Grade V.

== Personal life ==
Van Ham is gay and lives with his partner Jeffrey. He lives near Leuven, and teaches and works full time in retail.
