= Manon Claeys =

Belgian Paralympic equestrian

Medal record

Para-equestrian

Representing Belgium

Paralympic Games
Bronze medal – third place	2020 Tokyo	Championship IV
Bronze medal – third place	2020 Tokyo	Freestyle IV

European Championships
Silver medal – second place	2017 Gothenburg	Championship IV

Manon Claeys (born 3 January 1986 in Maldegem) is a Paralympic equestrian of Belgium. She broke her neck and three vertebrae in her back in a horse-riding accident on Friday the 13th, April 2007. As a result of the accident, she sustained nerve damage on her right side and has only 30% power on that side of her body. She participated at the 2020 Summer Paralympics and won a bronze medal in both the Championship IV and Freestyle IV dressage competitions.
