= Kris Bosmans =

Belgian cyclist (born 1980)

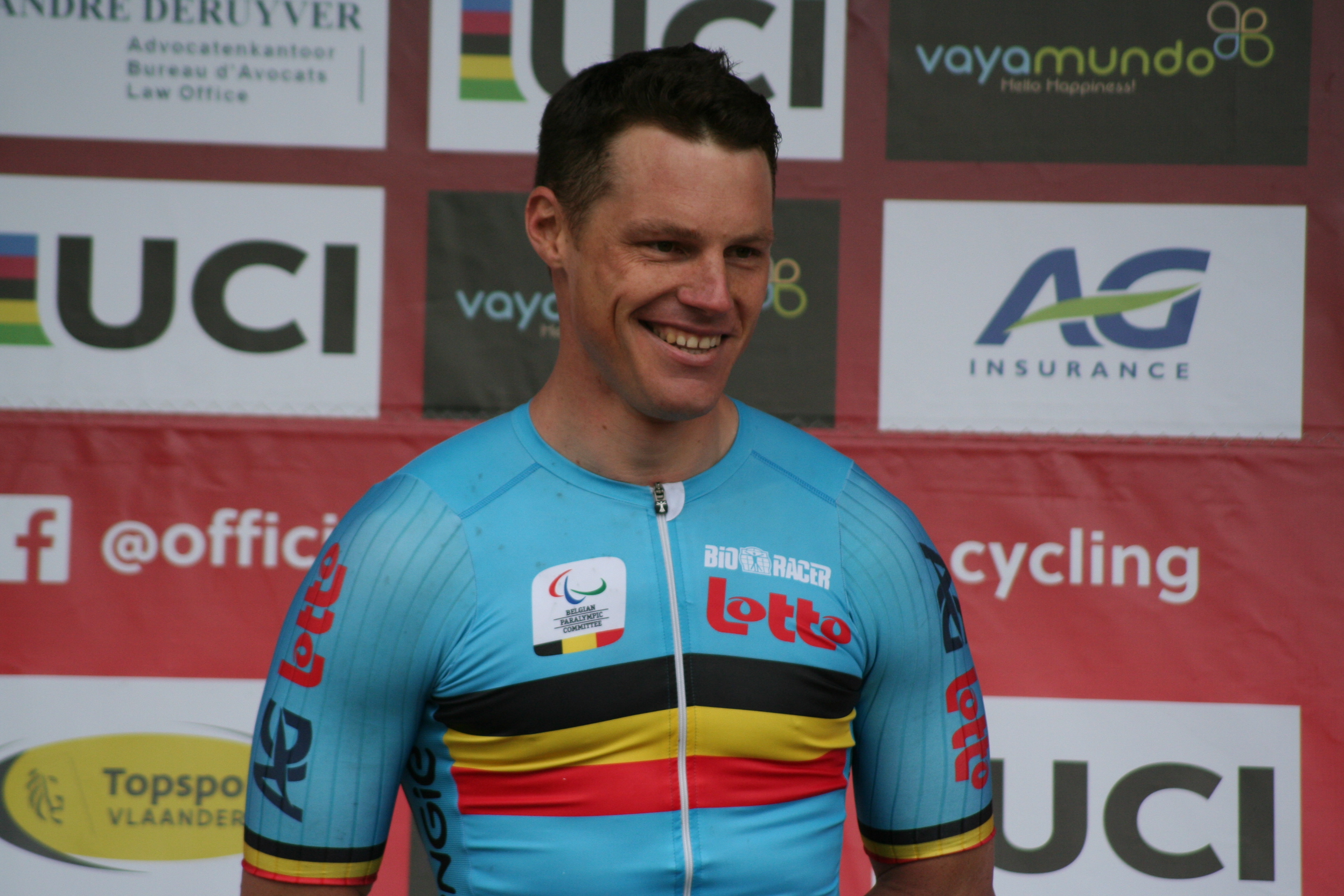

Personal information
- Born: 15 April 1980 (age 46) Elsene

Cycling career
- Sport: Cycling
- Discipline: Para-cycling
- Rider type: Para-cyclist

Kris Bosmans (born 15 April 1980 in Elsene) is a Belgian cyclist competing in paracycling class C3, road and track disciplines.

== Career in sports ==
Kris Bosmans started in cycling sports at the age of 15. He had his first successes in the youth league. In 1998 he suffered a stroke and needed two years to recover. Since then, his right leg, left foot and left hand are handicapped.

In 2008 Bosmans watched a documentary about the paracyclist Jan Boyen who won a bronze medal at the Summer Paralympics 2008. This inspired him to try to become a paracyclist. In 2011 he became the world champion of street racing at the UCI Paracyling Street Racing event. In 2012 he started at the Summer Paralympics in London; in the street race he ended ranked 5th. Since 2010 he has competed at the Belgian National Championships, becoming the Belgian National Champion several times.

In 2016 Bosmans won a silver medal at the 2016 Summer Paralympics in Rio de Janeiro, Brazil in the men's road race C1–3.

In 2018, and 7 years after Roskilde, Bosmans became for the 2nd time world champion, winning the gold medal in the road race C3 at the 2018 UCI Para-cycling Road World Championships in Maniago, Italy. Also in 2028, he won a bronze medal at the 2018 UCI Para-cycling Track World Championships in the 1 kilometer time trial C3.
