= Florian Van Acker =

Belgian para table tennis player

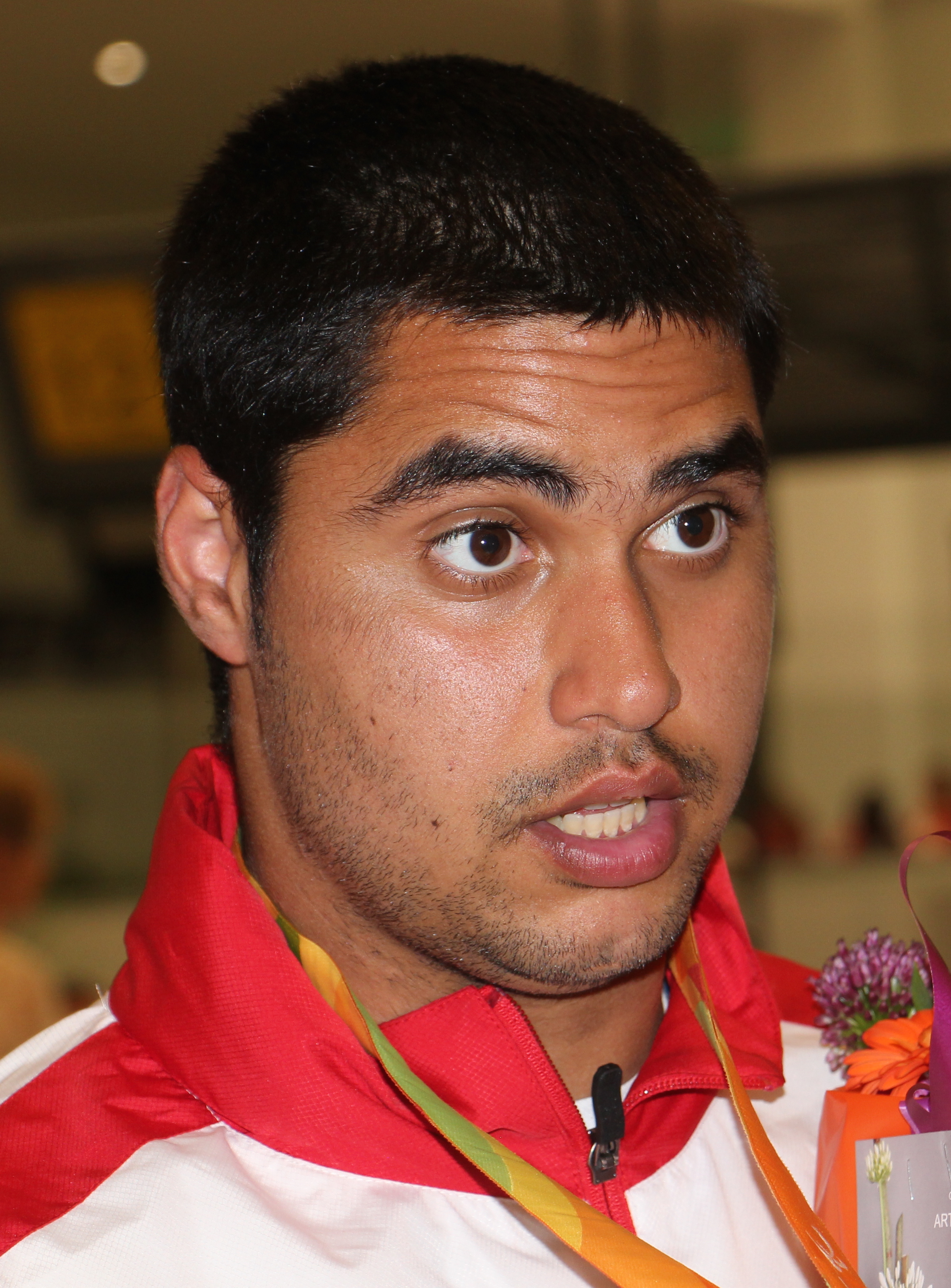
- Van Acker at 2016 Summer Paralympics

Personal information
- Nickname: Flo Flo
- Born: 28 February 1997 (age 29) Zalău, Romania
- Height: 1.72 m (5 ft 8 in)

Sport
- Country: Belgium
- Sport: Para table tennis
- Disability: Autism
- Disability class: C11
- Coached by: Nico Vergeylen
Medal record
Para table tennis
Representing Belgium
Paralympic Games
Gold medal – first place	2016 Rio de Janeiro	Men's singles C11
Bronze medal – third place	2020 Tokyo	Men's singles C11
World Championships
Gold medal – first place	2018 Lasko	Men's singles C11
Bronze medal – third place	2014 Gwangju	Men's singles C11
European Championships
Gold medal – first place	2015 Vejle	Men's singles C11
Gold medal – first place	2019 Helsingborg	Men's singles C11
Bronze medal – third place	2017 Lasko	Men's singles C11

Florian Van Acker (born 28 February 1997) is a Belgian para table tennis player who competes in international level events. He is a Paralympic champion, World champion and double European champion in the men's singles. He is trained by former World and Paralympic champion Nico Vergeylen. He is autistic and intellectually disabled.
