= Alain Ledoux =

Belgian table tennis player (1952–2008)

Personal information
- Born: 9 October 1953 La Louviere, Belgium
- Died: 16 October 2008 (aged 56)

Sport
- Sport: Para table tennis
Medal record
Representing Belgium
Paralympic Games
Bronze medal – third place	1984 Los Angeles	Teams 1C
Bronze medal – third place	1988 Seoul	Teams 1C
Bronze medal – third place	1996 Atlanta	Teams C4
European Championships
Bronze medal – third place	1991 Salou	Teams C1

Alain Ledoux (9 October 1952 – 16 October 2008) was a Belgian table tennis player who competed in Paralympic Games where he won three bronze medals. He is the father of fellow table tennis players Marc Ledoux.

== Paralympic Games ==
He competed for the first time in the 1984 Summer Paralympics where he won a bronze medal. He won another medal four years later in 1988 Summer Paralympics. He also took part in 1992 Summer Paralympics. He competed for the last time in 1996 Summer Paralympics where he won the third bronze medal of his sport career.

He joined 2004 and 2008 Summer Paralympics as a personal coach.
