= Jonas Van de Steene =

Belgian para-cyclist

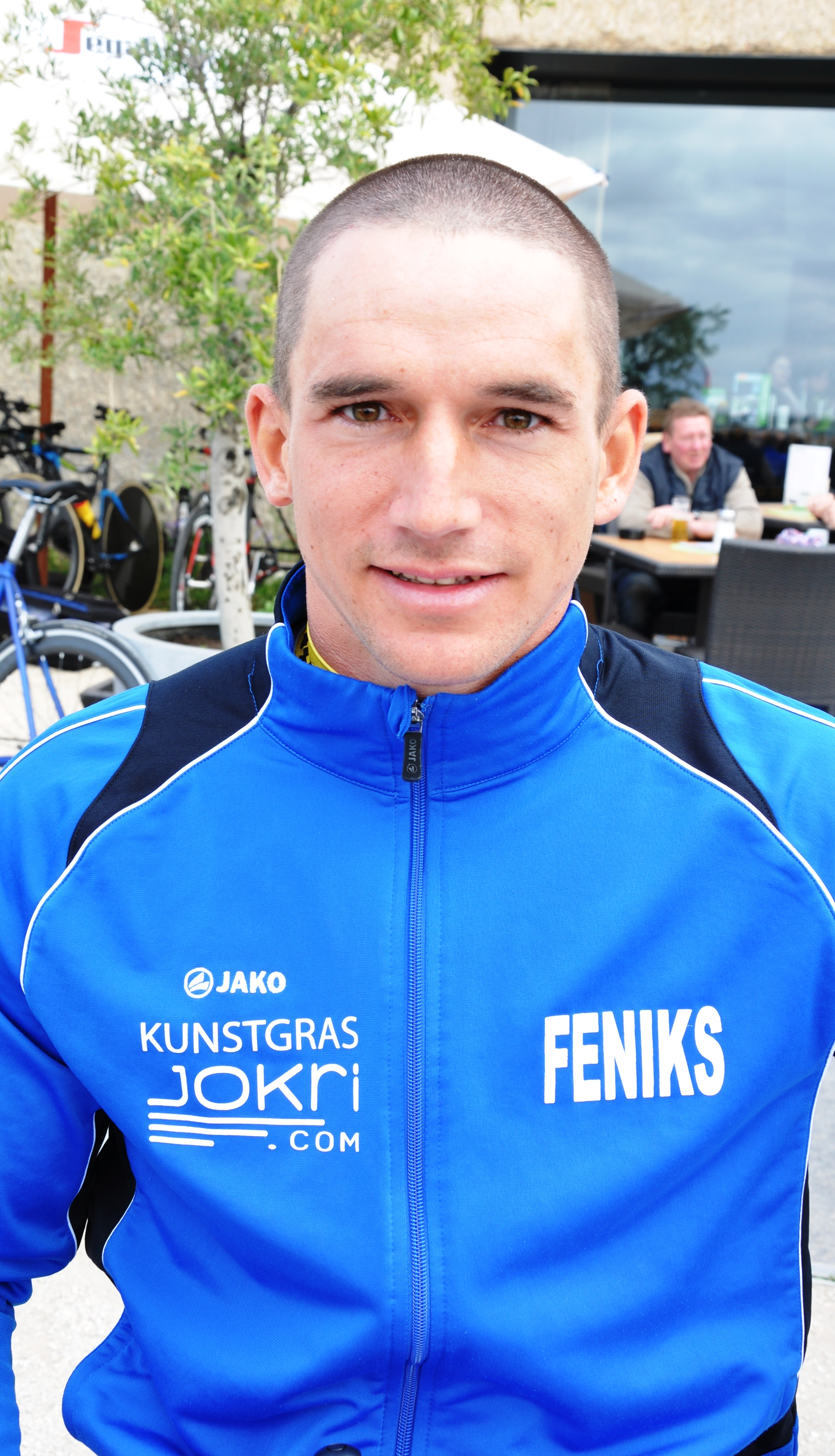
- Van de Steene in 2016

Personal information
- Nationality: Belgian
- Born: 15 February 1987 (age 39) Ghent, Belgium

Sport
- Sport: Para-cycling
- Disability class: H4
- Coached by: Remko Meeusen
- Retired: 25 August 2025 (age 38)
Medal record
Men's Para-cycling
Representing Belgium
Paralympic Games
Bronze medal – third place	2016 Rio de Janeiro	Mixed Team Relay (H2-5)
Bronze medal – third place	2024 Paris	Road time trial H4
Road World Championships
Gold medal – first place	2023 Glasgow	Road race H4

Jonas Van de Steene (born 15 February 1987) is a Belgian Para-cyclist who represented Belgium at the 2016, 2020 and 2024 Summer Paralympics.

== Biography ==
At the age of 25, Van de Steene suffered a thrombosis during a bike ride that affected his lower extremities and he had to adapt to living with a wheelchair. During his rehabilitation, Jonas saw the Paralympic Games in London on television and handcycling appealed to him. In May 2013 he rode a handbike for the first time and a year later Van de Steene started his international career. Jonas is now a resident of Playa Blanca on the Spanish island of Lanzarote, having arrived first on the island in 2014 with the aim of participating in the Vuelta a Playa Blanca Handbike.

== Personal ==
Van de Steene's sister, Saartje, is an actress in the Belgian television series Dertigers that runs on Flemish channel één.

== Career ==
Since 2014 Van de Steene represented Belgium at multiple UCI Para-cycling Road World Championships with his best result coming in 2023 when he became world champion in the road race H4 narrowly beating French rider Mathieu Bosredon and Austrian Thomas Fruhwirth in a sprint.

He represented Belgium at three Summer Paralympic Games winning two bronze medals, one as an individual in the road time trial H4 in Paris and one as member of the team relay in the mixed team relay (H2-5) in Rio de Janeiro.

In August 2025 he announced his retirement from the sport.

== Awards ==
- Trophy Victor Boin (2025)
