= Thierry Daubresse =

Belgian Paralympic athlete

Medal record

Paralympic athletics

Representing Belgium

Paralympic Games
Gold medal – first place	1996 Atlanta	Shot put F42
Bronze medal – third place	2000 Sydney	Shot put F42

Thierry Daubresse is a Paralympian athlete from Belgium competing mainly in category F42 shot put events.

Thierry competed in the 1996 Summer Paralympics in Atlanta where he won a gold medal in the F42 shot put as well as competing in the pentathlon, discus and javelin. He failed in his attempt to defend his title in 2000 when finishing third in the shot put as well as competing in the discus.
