= Steve Orens =

Belgian Paralympic athlete

Medal record

Paralympic athletics

Representing Belgium

Paralympic Games
Gold medal – first place	1996 Atlanta	800 metres - T52
Silver medal – second place	2000 Sydney	5000 metres - T52-53
Silver medal – second place	2000 Sydney	10000 metres - T52-53

Steve Orens is a Paralympian athlete from Belgium competing mainly in category T52 long-distance events.

Steve competed in the 1992 Paralympics in Barcelona in the TW3 class 400m and 800m and the combined TW3-4 1500m and 5000m. It was in the 1996 Summer Paralympics in Atlanta that he won his medals, a gold in the T52 800m and silvers in the T52-53 5000m and 10000m.
