= Alex Hermans =

Belgian Paralympic athlete

Medal record

Paralympic athletics

Representing Belgium

Paralympic Games
Gold medal – first place	1980 Arnhem	SP - CP C
Gold medal – first place	1980 Arnhem	LJ - CP C
Gold medal – first place	1984 New York	DT - C6
Gold medal – first place	1984 New York	SP - C6
Gold medal – first place	1988 Seoul	SP - C6
Gold medal – first place	1992 Barcelona	SP - C6
Silver medal – second place	1996 Atlanta	SP - C6
Bronze medal – third place	2000 Sydney	SP - F36

Alex Hermans is a former Paralympian athlete from Belgium. He competed mainly in category F36 shot put events.

He competed in the 1980 Summer Paralympics in Arnhem, Netherlands. There he won a gold medal in the men's Shot put - CP C event and a gold medal in the men's Long jump - CP C event. He also competed at the 1984 Summer Paralympics in New York City, United States winning a gold medal in the men's Discus throw - C6 event, a gold medal in the men's Shot put - C6 event and went out in the quarter-finals of the men's 100 metres - C7 event. He also competed at the 1988 Summer Paralympics in Seoul, South Korea winning a gold medal in the men's Shot put - C6 event. He also competed in the 1992 Summer Paralympics in Barcelona, Spain. There he won a gold medal in the men's Shot put - C6 event and finished seventh in the men's Discus throw - C7 event. He also competed at the 1996 Summer Paralympics in Atlanta, United States., a silver medal in the men's Shot put - C6 event and finished fourth in the men's Discus throw - C7 event. He also competed at the 2000 Summer Paralympics in Sydney, Australia winning a bronze medal in the men's Shot put - F36 event and finished fifth in the men's Discus throw - F36 event.
