= Sven Decaesstecker =

Belgian Paralympic swimmer

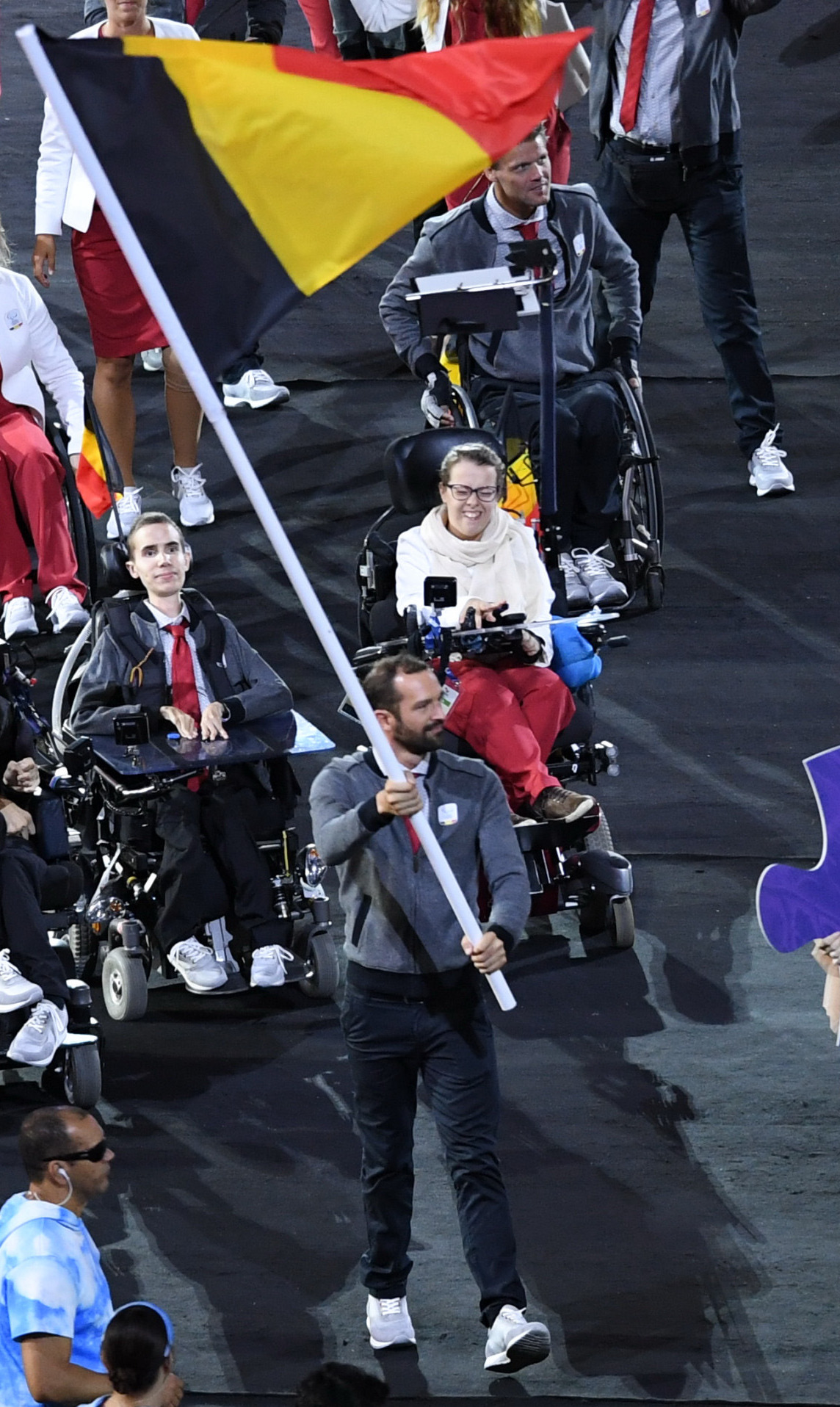
- Decaesstecker at the 2016 Summer Paralympics Parade of Nations

Personal information
- Nationality: Belgian
- Born: 31 May 1985 (age 41) Torhout, Belgium
- Height: 1.84 m (6 ft 0 in)
- Weight: 70 kg (154 lb)

Sport
- Sport: Swimming
Medal record
Representing Belgium
IPC World Championships
Bronze medal – third place	2010 Eindhoven	200 m medley SM10
IPC European Championships
Silver medal – second place	2009 Reykjavik	200 m medley SM10
Bronze medal – third place	2014 Eindhoven	100 m backstroke S10

Sven "Rocker" Decaesstecker (born 31 May 1985) is a Belgian Paralympic swimmer.

== Biography ==
Decaesstecker has been a participant in local competitions since he was eight. As a young swimmer, Decaesstecker won both regional and national titles.

At age eleven, Decaesstecker was diagnosed with bone cancer. After one year of chemotherapy and the amputation of his right foot, he started swimming again. He trained for both the disabled league and the able-bodied swimming club in Ostend. His new coach there was Stefaan Maene, an ex-Olympic swimmer that participated in the 1992 Summer Olympics in Barcelona. In the Royal Ostend Swimming Club, Decaesstecker was reunited with Mathieu Fonteyn, with whom he was close friends at the beginning of his swimming career at the age of 8. There were some changes at the Royal Ostend Swimming Club, swimmers like Mathieu Fonteyn and Brian Ryckeman that are now among the top of Belgian swimming left the club. Stefaan Maene left as head coach and Guy Verhelst followed. Two years later the new head coach was Patrick Boucquaert, it was with Boucquaert that Decaesstecker went to the 2004 Paralympic Games in Athens.

In 2005 Greg Planckaert became the club's new head coach and took Decaesstecker to the World Championships in Durban, South Africa, in 2006. Decaesstecker qualified for the 2008 Paralympic Games in Beijing, and the first Paralympic Short Course World Championships in 2009.

== Personal ==
Decaesstecker is working towards a bachelor's degree in political science with a major in national politics at Ghent University.

His studies have led him to participate in the 2006 elections for city council in his hometown of Kortemark, as a candidate for the Flemish Liberals and Democrats (VLD) and as a member of the majority.

He is a representative on the Belgian Paralympic Committee, where he was elected as chairman of the Athletes' Board.

== Competitions ==
The first International Paralympic competition Decaesstecker went to was the European Championships in Brauwnschweig, Germany in 1999. At age 14, he reached the finals of the 100 m breaststroke, 200 m individual medley and 400 m freestyle.

His next competition was the next European Championships in Stockholm, Sweden in 2001. Again he made the finals in the 100 m backstroke, 400 m freestyle, 200 m individual medley and won the bronze medal in the 100 m breaststroke.

One year later at the World Championships in Mar del Plata, Argentina in 2002 he reached the finals in the 100 m breaststroke (5th place), 100 m backstroke (6th place) and 200 m individual medley (5th place).

2003 was the year where qualification for the next Paralympic Games in Athens was important. Decaesstecker tried to swim his qualifying time at international competitions.

At the 2004 Summer Paralympics Decaesstecker competed for a medal in the 200 m individual medley and 100 m breaststroke. Again he made it to the finals in the 100 m breaststroke (5th place), 200 m individual medley (5th place) and 100 m backstroke (6th place).

At the next Paralympic Swimming World Championships in Durban, South Africa in 2006 Decaesstecker was again going for the medal. Decaesstecker again made it to the finals three times, but did not come close to his personal best time on any stroke. He finished 6th in the 200 m individual medley, 7th in the 100 m backstroke, and 8th in the 100 m breaststroke.

Decaesstecker also competed at the 2008, 2012 and 2016 Paralympics, winning no medals.
