= Laurens Devos =

Belgian table tennis player

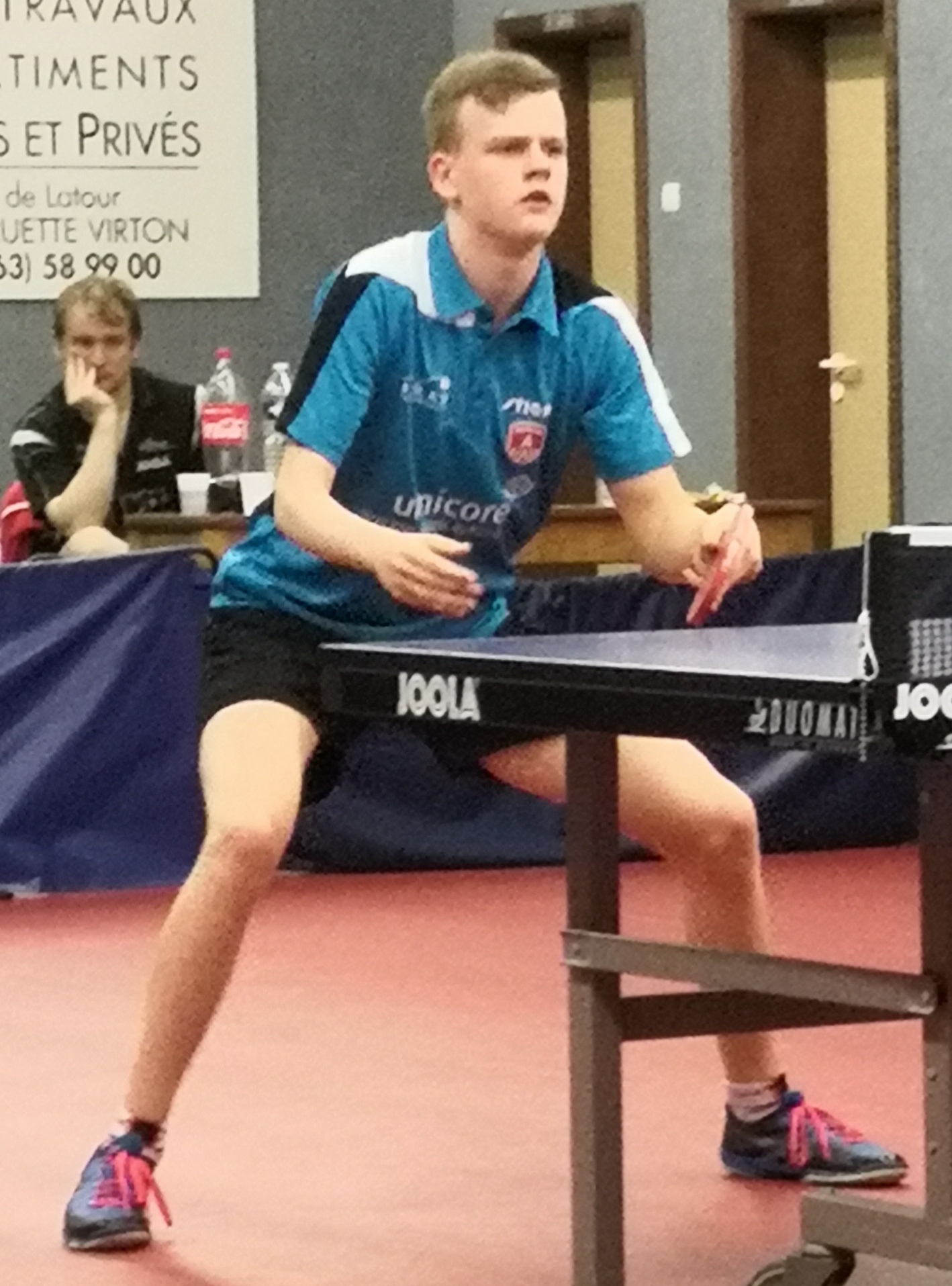

Personal information
- Nationality: Belgian
- Born: 15 August 2000 (age 25) Malle, Belgium
- Home town: Oostmalle, Belgium
- Height: 165 cm (5 ft 5 in)

Sport
- Country: Belgium
- Sport: Para table tennis
- Disability: Mild hemiplegia
- Disability class: C9
- Club: Sokah Hoboken
- Coached by: Carlo Agnello
Medal record
Para table tennis
Representing Belgium
Paralympic Games
Gold medal – first place	2016 Rio de Janeiro	Singles class 9
Gold medal – first place	2020 Tokyo	Singles class 9
Gold medal – first place	2024 Paris	Singles class 9
World Championships
Gold medal – first place	2018 Lasko	Singles class 9
European Championships
Gold medal – first place	2015 Vejle	Singles class 9
Gold medal – first place	2015 Vejle	Teams class 9
Gold medal – first place	2017 Lasko	Singles class 9
Gold medal – first place	2017 Lasko	Teams class 9
Gold medal – first place	2019 Helsingborg	Singles class 9
Bronze medal – third place	2019 Helsingborg	Teams class 9

Laurens Devos (born 15 August 2000) is a Belgian table tennis player who was the Paralympic champion in men's singles class 9. He has also won four European titles and most recently, a world title for his country.

Laurens Devos lives in Oostmalle. The son of Mario Devos and Christel, he has 2 brothers and a twin sister, Isabel. His 6 years older brother Robin Devos is as of 14 September 2016 the second-highest ranked able-bodied Belgian table tennis player, ranked number 119 on the World Ranking.

Caused by a lack of oxygen at birth, Laurens has mild hemiplegia which results in a loss of mobility on the right side of his body. He plays left-handed. He studies at the Topsportschool in Leuven, where he is the only student with a disability.

== Sporting career ==
Laurens Devos was ranked world number 2 in his class before going to the Paralympics. In 2014 he won the GDF Suez Trophy (the award for most promising young Belgian para-athlete). He won the 2015 European Championships in Vejle, Denmark. He is national table tennis champion in his age category (able-bodied category).

With his victory over Dutch Gerben Last in 3 straight sets, Devos became the youngest player ever to win table tennis gold at the Paralympics.

At the 2016 ITTF Star Awards, Devos won Male Para Table Tennis Star, the award for Paralympic table tennis player of the year.

Devos reached the first round of the 2016 World Junior Table Tennis Championships, but then lost 4-3 from the Austrian Andreas Levenko.

On 17 December 2016, Devos was named the Paralympian of the Year at the Belgian Sportsman of the year ceremony.

He won his first world championship title in 2018 in Lasko, Slovenia by defeating Iurii Nozdrunov of Russia.
