= Kurt Van Raefelghem =

Belgian Paralympic athlete

Medal record

Paralympic athletics

Representing Belgium

Paralympic Games
Gold medal – first place	2000 Sydney	Pentathlon - P13
Silver medal – second place	1992 Barcelona	LJ - B3
Silver medal – second place	1996 Atlanta	Pentathlon - P12
Bronze medal – third place	1996 Atlanta	LJ - F12
Bronze medal – third place	2004 Athens	Pentathlon - P13

Kurt Van Raefelghem is a Paralympian athlete from Belgium competing mainly in category P13 pentathlon events.

== Biography ==
He competed in the 1992 Summer Paralympics in Barcelona, Spain. There he won a silver medal in the men's Long jump - B3 event, finished seventh in the men's 100 metres - B3 event and finished sixth in the men's 200 metres - B3 event. He also competed at the 1996 Summer Paralympics in Atlanta, United States., a silver medal in the men's Pentathlon - P12 event and a bronze medal in the men's Long jump - F12 event. He also competed at the 2000 Summer Paralympics in Sydney, Australia., a gold medal in the men's Pentathlon - P13 event, went out in the first round of the men's 100 metres - T13 event and finished fourth in the men's Long jump - F13 event. He also competed in the 2004 Summer Paralympics in Athens, Greece. There he won a bronze medal in the men's Pentathlon - P13 event and finished fifteenth in the men's Long jump - F12 event.
