= Benny Govaerts =

Belgian Paralympic athlete

Medal record

Paralympic athletics

Representing Belgium

Paralympic Games
Gold medal – first place	1988 Seoul	1500 metres - C7
Gold medal – first place	1988 Seoul	800 metres - C7
Gold medal – first place	1988 Seoul	5000 metres cross country - C7
Gold medal – first place	1992 Barcelona	5000 metres - C5-8
Silver medal – second place	2000 Sydney	5000 metres - T38
Bronze medal – third place	1996 Atlanta	5000 metres - T34-37
Bronze medal – third place	2000 Sydney	1500 metres - T37

Benny Govaerts is a Paralympian athlete from Belgium competing mainly in category T37 middle-distance events.

== Biography ==
Benny has competed in 5 Paralympics and won 4 gold, 1 silver and 2 bronze medals, making him one of the most successful Belgian Paralympians.. in his first games in 1988 he won three gold medals in the C7 class 800m, 1500m and 5000m cross country. He added a further gold medal in 1992 in the 5000m. 1996 games were the first that Benny did not win a gold medal at winning only a bronze medal in the 5000m. Things improved in 2000 when he won a silver in the 5000m and a bronze in the 1500m only for the 2004 Summer Paralympics to yield no medals.
