= Barbara Minneci =

Belgian para-equestrian

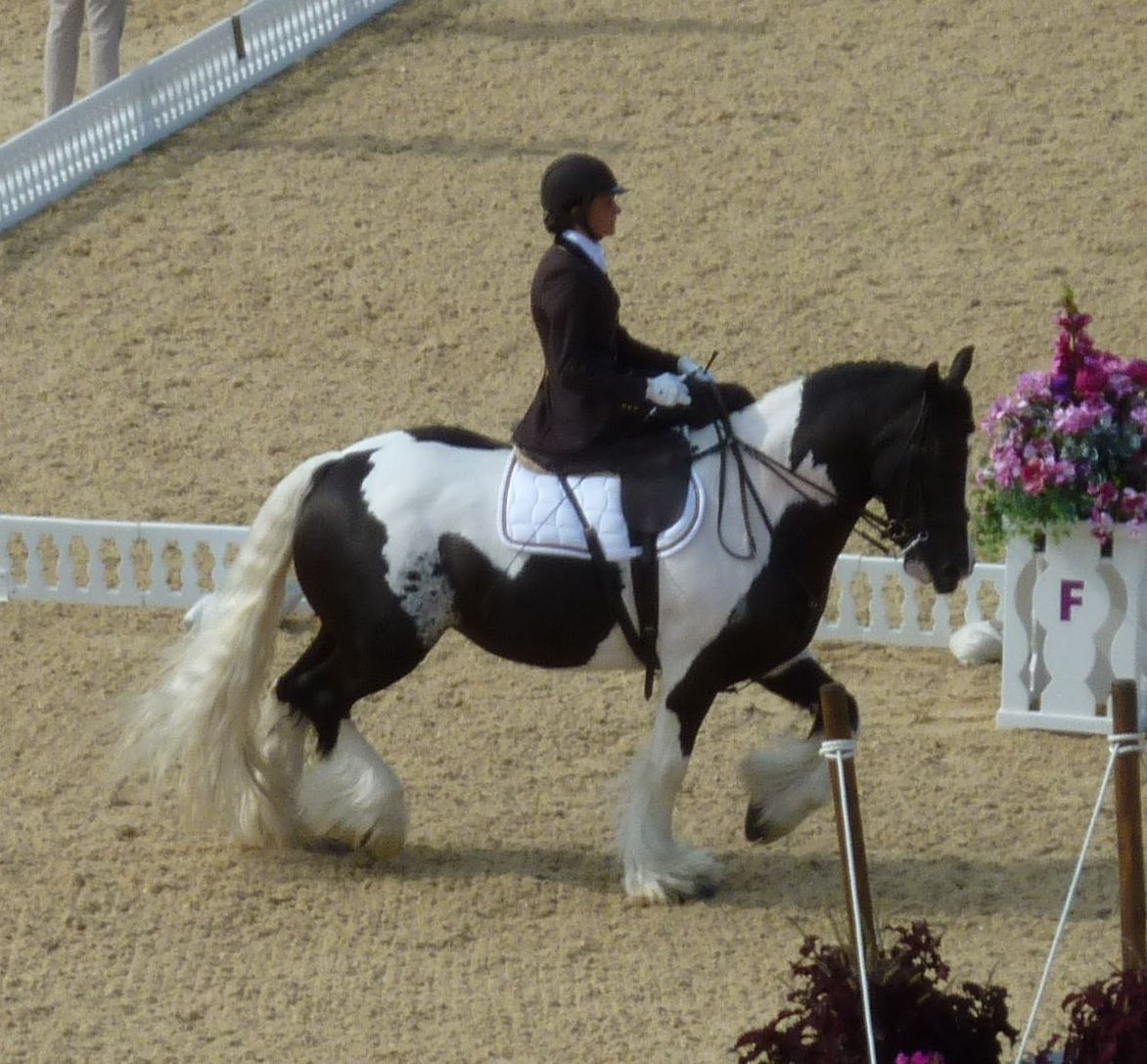
- Barilla & Barbara at the 2012 Summer Paralympics

Personal information
- Born: 12 June 1969 (age 57)
Medal record
Representing Belgium
Para-equestrian
European Championships
| Bronze medal – third place | 2019 Eindhoven | Championship III |
| Bronze medal – third place | 2019 Eindhoven | Freestyle III |

Barbara Minneci (born 12 June 1969, in Brussels) is a Belgian Para-Equestrian Grade II, in dressage who is well recognised for riding side saddle. She rode her horse Barilla at the 2012 Summer Paralympics and stood out due to her riding style and Barilla being a Gypsy Cob type. They did not place in the medals.

Barbara took up para-equestrian in 2009 at age 40 in Brussels, Belgium after developing cancer in 1996 and 2004 left her with monoplegia in her left leg and muscle loss in her right leg.
