= Gino De Keersmaeker =

Belgian Paralympic athlete

Medal record

Paralympic athletics

Representing Belgium

Paralympic Games
Gold medal – first place	1996 Atlanta	Discut throw F42
Silver medal – second place	2000 Sydney	Discus throw F42
Silver medal – second place	2004 Athens	Discus throw F42

Gino De Keersmaeker is an athlete and Paralympian from Belgium competing mainly in category F42 discus throw and shot put events. He competed in all 6 Paralympic Games between 1992 and 2012, winning a gold medal in 1996 and silver medals in 2000 and 2004.

== Results ==
- 1992
  - Men's Shot Put THS2: 13th
  - Men's Discus Throw THS2: 11th
- 1996
  - Men's Shot Put F42: 5th
  - Men's Discus Throw F42: 1st
- 2000
  - Men's Shot Put F42: 4th
  - Men's Discus Throw F42: 2nd
- 2004
  - Men's Shot Put F42: 6th
  - Men's Discus Throw F42: 2nd
- 2008
  - Men's Shot Put F42: 12th
  - Men's Discus Throw F42: 5th
- 2012
  - Men's Discus Throw F42: 6th
