= Belgian Paralympic Committee =

National Paralympic Committee of Belgium

National Paralympic Committee
- Country: Belgium
- Code: BEL
- Created: 1960
- Continental association: EPC
- Headquarters: Brussels, Belgium
- President: Anne Van Neste d'Ieteren
- Secretary General: Marc Vergauwen
- Website: www.paralympic.be

The Belgian Paralympic Committee (BPC) is the umbrella organization in Belgium of organized sport for people with a disability. It acts as the Belgian National Paralympic Committee, making it the official Belgian representative to the European Paralympic Committee (EPC) and the International Paralympic Committee (IPC). The Belgian Paralympic Committee has two members, a Flemish league (Parantee-Psylos) and a French-speaking league for disabled sports (Ligue Handisport Francophone (LHF)).

In collaboration with the Belgian Olympic Committee (BOIC), Belgian athletes participate in world and European championships and every four years in the Paralympic Games, the Olympic Games for athletes with a visual or motor disability. Since the first Paralympic Games in 1960, Belgium has been sending a delegation to every Summer Games.

The BPC's tasks:

- promotion of the sport for people with disabilities
- provide support to Parantee and LHF
- working for a status for top sports athletes
- drawing up selection criteria
- coordination of national and international competitions
- preparation and organization of participation in international competitions
- coordination of the sports calendar
- participation in the activities of the international federations

== History ==
Since 1952, professors Pierre Houssa and Albert Tricot of the Center for Traumatology and Readaptation at the Brugmann Hospital in Brussels have been using sport as a means of readaptation with the support of Victor Boin, the then chairman of the BOIC. Pierre Houssa had picked up the idea that year when visiting a British institution in Stoke Mandeville. Two years later, in 1954, some of their patients took part in an international meeting in Stoke Mandeville. A similar meeting was organized in Brussels in 1958.

The Belgian Sports Federation for the Disabled (BSVG/FSBH) was founded in 1960, with Victor Boin as its first president, and Pierre Houssa as one of its vice-presidents. In 1977 it was decided to split the BSVG/FSBH into a Dutch-speaking league, the Vlaamse Liga Gehandicaptensport (VLG) and the French-speaking FSBAP-WB. These two associations became members of the BSVG/FSBH. The BSVG/FSBH itself only retains an overarching function for the organization of competitive sport.

In 2001, the BSVG/FSBH became the BPC. The FSBAP-WB adopted the name LHF in 2005, and VLG the name Parantee in 2012. In 2017, Parantee merged with another Flemish organisation for impaired, Psylos, to become Parantee-Psylos.

Until 2003, the secretariat was housed in the Brugmann hospital, in 2003 a new easily accessible building was opened on the Heysel plain, opposite the BOIC building.

== See also ==
- Belgium at the Paralympics
