= Athletics at the 1996 Summer Paralympics =

Athletics at the X Paralympic Games
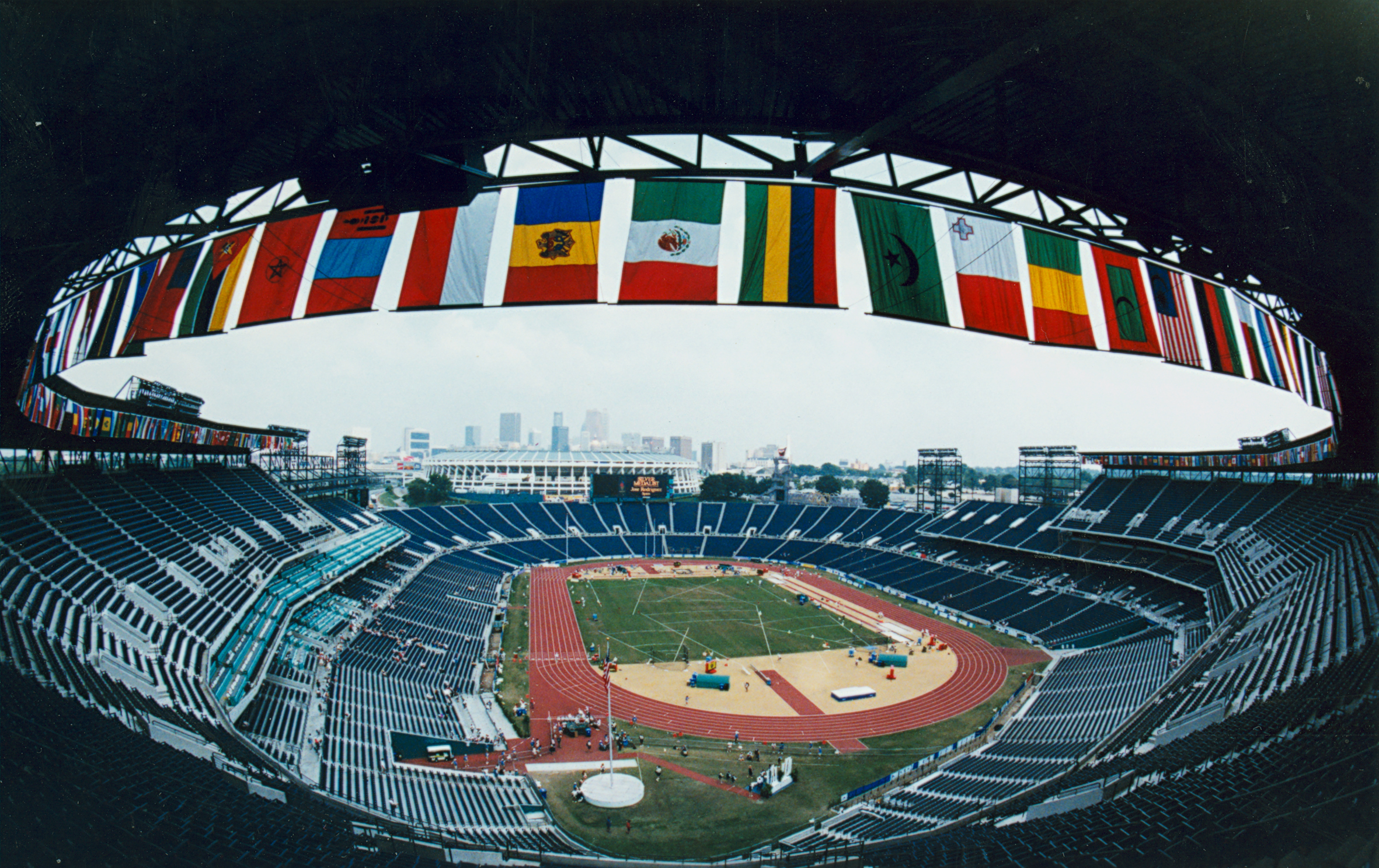
- Venue: Centennial Olympic Stadium
- Dates: 17 to 25 August
- Competitors: 908 from 84 nations

Athletics at the 1996 Summer Paralympics consisted of 210 events, 155 for men and 55 for women.

== Participating nations ==
- Algeria (7)
- Angola (2)
- Argentina (6)
- Australia (42)
- Austria (18)
- Azerbaijan (1)
- Bahrain (4)
- Belarus (8)
- Belgium (11)
- Bosnia and Herzegovina (2)
- Brazil (12)
- Bulgaria (4)
- Canada (40)
- China (15)
- Chinese Taipei (4)
- Colombia (2)
- Croatia (3)
- Cuba (8)
- Cyprus (3)
- Czech Republic (14)
- Denmark (3)
- Dominican Republic (2)
- Ecuador (2)
- Egypt (17)
- Estonia (4)
- Fiji (2)
- Finland (12)
- France (21)
- Germany (61)
- Great Britain (62)
- Greece (11)
- Honduras (2)
- Hong Kong (5)
- Hungary (6)
- Iceland (2)
- India (7)
- Iran (7)
- Ireland (28)
- Israel (3)
- Italy (18)
- Jamaica (3)
- Japan (19)
- Jordan (4)
- Kenya (16)
- Kuwait (11)
- Latvia (5)
- Lithuania (8)
- Macau (1)
- Malaysia (3)
- Mauritius (2)
- Mexico (15)
- Moldova (3)
- Morocco (2)
- Netherlands (7)
- New Zealand (7)
- Nigeria (1)
- Norway (4)
- Oman (2)
- Panama (1)
- Poland (17)
- Portugal (12)
- Puerto Rico (2)
- Russia (20)
- Sierra Leone (1)
- Singapore (1)
- Slovakia (4)
- Slovenia (4)
- South Africa (18)
- South Korea (6)
- Spain (59)
- Sri Lanka (1)
- Sweden (15)
- Switzerland (18)
- Thailand (3)
- Tunisia (3)
- Ukraine (7)
- United Arab Emirates (4)
- United States (109)
- Uruguay (1)
- Venezuela (1)
- Yugoslavia (2)
- Zambia (1)
- Zimbabwe (2)

== Medal summary ==
=== Medal table ===
Rank	Nation	Gold	Silver	Bronze	Total
1	United States (USA)	23	24	33	80
2	Spain (ESP)	21	15	13	49
3	Australia (AUS)	19	12	13	44
4	Great Britain (GBR)	12	14	16	42
5	Germany (GER)	10	24	18	52
6	Canada (CAN)	10	16	12	38
7	Switzerland (SUI)	9	3	6	18
8	China (CHN)	8	7	2	17
9	Cuba (CUB)	8	3	0	11
10	Egypt (EGY)	7	6	9	22
11	South Africa (RSA)	7	4	4	15
12	Iran (IRI)	7	4	1	12
13	Poland (POL)	6	6	2	14
14	Russia (RUS)	6	3	4	13
15	France (FRA)	5	8	8	21
16	Japan (JPN)	5	6	2	13
17	Italy (ITA)	4	4	5	13
18	Belgium (BEL)	4	4	2	10
19	Portugal (POR)	4	1	3	8
20	Mexico (MEX)	3	4	4	11
21	Belarus (BLR)	3	3	7	13
22	Lithuania (LTU)	3	2	5	10
23	New Zealand (NZL)	2	3	1	6
24	Algeria (ALG)	2	2	3	7
25	Nigeria (NGR)	2	1	0	3
26	South Korea (KOR)	2	0	2	4
27	Ivory Coast (CIV)	2	0	0	2
27	Panama (PAN)	2	0	0	2
29	Sweden (SWE)	1	5	3	9
30	Czech Republic (CZE)	1	3	1	5
31	Austria (AUT)	1	2	3	6
32	Estonia (EST)	1	2	2	5
33	Argentina (ARG)	1	2	0	3
34	Kuwait (KUW)	1	1	1	3
34	Ukraine (UKR)	1	1	1	3
36	Finland (FIN)	1	1	0	2
36	Kenya (KEN)	1	1	0	2
38	Ireland (IRL)	1	0	5	6
39	Greece (GRE)	1	0	2	3
39	Netherlands (NED)	1	0	2	3
41	Hong Kong (HKG)	1	0	1	2
41	Slovakia (SVK)	1	0	1	2
43	Dominican Republic (DOM)	1	0	0	1
44	Brazil (BRA)	0	5	6	11
45	Iceland (ISL)	0	3	0	3
46	Tunisia (TUN)	0	2	0	2
47	Denmark (DEN)	0	1	1	2
47	Slovenia (SLO)	0	1	1	2
49	Israel (ISR)	0	1	0	1
49	Jordan (JOR)	0	1	0	1
51	Bulgaria (BUL)	0	0	1	1
51	Jamaica (JAM)	0	0	1	1
51	Moldova (MDA)	0	0	1	1
51	Thailand (THA)	0	0	1	1
51	Uruguay (URU)	0	0	1	1
Totals (55 entries)		211	211	210	632

=== Men's events ===
Event	Gold	Silver	Bronze
100 m T10	Júlio Requena; Spain	José Manuel Rodríguez; Spain	Andrew Curtis; Great Britain
100 m T11	Juan António Prieto; Spain	Miroslaw Pych; Poland	Jorge Núñez; Spain
100 m T12	Aldo Manganaro; Italy	Enrique Caballero; Cuba	Leroi Court; Australia
100 m T32	Lachlan Jones; Australia	Joseph Radmore; Canada	Paul Williams; Great Britain
100 m T33	Ross Davis; United States	Gunnar Krantz; Sweden	David Larson; United States
100 m T34	Néstor Suarez; Argentina	Jaime Romaguera; Australia	Paul Hughes; Great Britain
100 m T35	Du Chun Kim; South Korea	Fernando Gomez; Spain	Freeman Register; United States
100 m T36	Mohamed Allek; Algeria	Peter Haber; Germany	Ahmed Hassan Mahmoud; Egypt
100 m T37	Stephen Payton; Great Britain	Lincoln Scott; United States	Douglas Amador; Brazil
100 m T42	Lukas Christen; Switzerland	Paul Gregori; France	Todd Schaffhauser; United States
100 m T43–44	Tony Volpentest; United States	Neil Fuller; Australia	Bradley Thomas; Australia
100 m T45–46	Ajibola Adeoye; Nigeria	Geir Sverrisson; Iceland	Klaus Felser; Austria
100 m T51	Paul Nitz; United States	Andre Beaudoin; Canada	Dean Bergeron; Canada
100 m T52	John Lindsay; Australia	Yasuhiro Une; Japan	Matthew Parry; United States
100 m T53	David Holding; Great Britain	Håkan Eriksson; Sweden	Claude Issorat; France
200 m MH	Nigel Bourne; Great Britain	Tico Clawson; United States	Kenneth Colaine; Great Britain
200 m T10	Júlio Requena; Spain	Andrew Curtis; Great Britain	Jorge Llerena; Uruguay
200 m T11	Omar Moya; Cuba	Juan António Prieto; Spain	Holger Geffers; Germany
200 m T12	Robert Jiménez; Dominican Republic	Aldo Manganaro; Italy	Arthur Lewis; United States
200 m T34–35	Freeman Register; United States	Fernando Gomez; Spain	Du Chun Kim; South Korea
200 m T36	Mohamed Allek; Algeria	Peter Haber; Germany	Ahmed Hassan Mahmoud; Egypt
200 m T37	Stephen Payton; Great Britain	Douglas Amador; Brazil	Darren Thrupp; Australia
200 m T42	Lukas Christen; Switzerland	Paul Gregori; France	Lothar Overesch; Germany
200 m T43–44	Tony Volpentest; United States	Neil Fuller; Australia	Patrick Stoll; Switzerland
200 m T45–46	Ajibola Adeoye; Nigeria	Geir Sverrisson; Iceland	Daniel Louw; South Africa
200 m T51	Dean Bergeron; Canada	Shawn Meredith; United States	Bradley Ramage; United States
200 m T52	Yasuhiro Une; Japan	John Lindsay; Australia	Wolfgang Petersen; Germany
200 m T53	Claude Issorat; France	Håkan Eriksson; Sweden	David Holding; Great Britain
400 m T10	Domingos Ramião Gomes; Portugal	Jose Luis Tovar; Spain	Carlos Lopes; Portugal
400 m T11	Omar Moya; Cuba	Sergio Sánchez; Spain	Ingo Geffers; Germany
400 m T12	Ambrosio Zaldivar; Cuba	Youcef Boudjeltia; Algeria	Aldo Manganaro; Italy
400 m T32–33	David Larson; United States	Gunnar Krantz; Sweden	Ross Davis; United States
400 m T34–35	Du Chun Kim; South Korea	Fernando Gomez; Spain	Richard Collins; Great Britain
400 m T36	Ahmed Hassan Mahmoud; Egypt	Lamouri Rahmouni; France	Yiu Cheung Cheung; Hong Kong
400 m T37	Stephen Payton; Great Britain	Malcolm Pringle; South Africa	José Manuel González; Spain
400 m T42–46	Oumar Basakoulba Kone; Ivory Coast	Geir Sverrisson; Iceland	Patrice Gerges; France
400 m T50	Alvise de Vidi; Italy	Tim Johansson; Sweden	Giuseppe Forni; Switzerland
400 m T51	Shawn Meredith; United States	Dean Bergeron; Canada	Andre Beaudoin; Canada
400 m T52	Winfried Sigg; Germany	Markus Pilz; Germany	John Lindsay; Australia
400 m T53	Claude Issorat; France	Jeffrey Adams; Canada	Jeferey Muralt; New Zealand
800 m T10	Domingos Ramiao Game; Portugal	Paulo de Almeida Coelho; Portugal	Pedro Delgado; Spain
800 m T11	José Antonio Sánchez; Spain	José Saura; Spain	Ruben Delgado; Spain
800 m T34–36	Joseph Parker; United States	Andrzej Wrobel; Poland	Faouzi Bellele; Algeria
800 m T37	Malcolm Pringle; South Africa	John Nethercott; Great Britain	Manfred Kooy; Netherlands
800 m T44–46	Oumar Basakoulba Kone; Ivory Coast	David Evans; Australia	Bachir Zergoune; Algeria
800 m T50	Alvise de Vidi; Italy	Fabian Blattman; Australia	Bart Dodson; United States
800 m T51	Shawn Meredith; United States	Dean Bergeron; Canada	Per Vesterlund; Sweden
800 m T52	Steve Orens; Belgium	Heinz Frei; Switzerland	Marc Quessy; Canada
800 m T53	Jeffrey Adams; Canada	Scot Hollonbeck; United States	Mustapha Badid; France
1500 m T10	Paulo de Almeida Coelho; Portugal	Robert Matthews; Great Britain	Henry Willis; United States
1500 m T11	José Antonio Sánchez; Spain	Cesar Carlavilla; Spain	Saulius Leonavicius; Lithuania
1500 m T12	Said Gomez; Panama	Stuart McGregor; Canada	Christophe Carayon; France
1500 m T34–37	Andrzej Wrobel; Poland	Malcolm Pringle; South Africa	Faouzi Bellele; Algeria
1500 m T44–46	David Evans; Australia	Yanjian Wu; China	Emmanuel Lacroix; France
1500 m T50	Fabian Blattman; Australia	Alvise de Vidi; Italy	Tim Johansson; Sweden
1500 m T51	Per Vesterlund; Sweden	Dean Bergeron; Canada	Clayton Gerein; Canada
1500 m T52–53	Heinz Frei; Switzerland	Scot Hollonbeck; United States	Philippe Couprie; France
5000 m T10	Paulo de Almeida Coelho; Portugal	Alejandro Guerrero; Mexico	Henry Willis; United States
5000 m T11	Noel Thatcher; Great Britain	Kestutis Bartkenas; Lithuania	Waldemar Kikolski; Poland
5000 m T12	Said Gomez; Panama	Diosmani Gonzalez; Cuba	Ildar Pomykalov; Russia
5000 m T34–37	Joseph Parker; United States	Faouzi Bellele; Algeria	Benny Govaerts; Belgium
5000 m T44–46	Javier Conde; Spain	Yanjian Wu; China	Emmanuel Lacroix; France
5000 m T51	Clayton Gerein; Canada	Greg Smith; Australia	Patrick Cottini; United States
5000 m T52–53	Saúl Mendoza; Mexico	Steve Orens; Belgium	Franz Nietlispach; Switzerland
10,000 m T10	Alejandro Guerrero; Mexico	Henry Willis; United States	Carlos Amaral Ferreira; Portugal
10,000 m T11	Noel Thatcher; Great Britain	Waldemar Kikolski; Poland	Kestutis Bartkenas; Lithuania
10,000 m T12	Diosmani Gonzalez; Cuba	Mark Farnell; Great Britain	Nikolai Tchoumak; Moldova
10,000 m T52–53	Heinz Frei; Switzerland	Steve Orens; Belgium	Prasopchoke Klunngern; Thailand
Marathon T10	Harumi Yanagawa; Japan	Carlo Durante; Italy	Nicolas Ledezma; Mexico
Marathon T11	Waldemar Kikolski; Poland	Tomasz Chmurzynski; Poland	Francisco Perez; Spain
Marathon T12	Anton Sluka; Slovakia	Mark Farnell; Great Britain	J. Onofre da Costa; Portugal
Marathon T42–46	Javier Conde; Spain	Joseba Larrinaga; Spain	Mark Brown; Great Britain
Marathon T50	Heinrich Koeberle; Germany	Bart Dodson; United States	Tim Johansson; Sweden
Marathon T51	Brent McMahon; Canada	Clayton Gerein; Canada	Patrick Cottini; United States
Marathon T52–53	Franz Nietlispach; Switzerland	Kazuya Murozuka; Japan	Heinz Frei; Switzerland
4×100 m relay T10–12	Spain (ESP); Juan António Prieto; Jorge Núñez; Enrique Sánchez–Guijo; Júlio Requena	Germany (GER); Gerd Franzka; Joerg Trippen-Hilgers; Ingo Geffers; Holger Geffers	United States (USA); Winford Haynes; Andre Asbury; Marvin Campbell; Arthur Lewis
4×100 m relay T34–37	Hong Kong (HKG); Shing Chung Chan; Kwok Pang Chao; Yiu Cheung Cheung; Wa Wai So	United States (USA); Lincoln Scott; Jason Tercey; Freeman Register; Ryan Blankenship	Great Britain (GBR); Stephen Payton; Mark Newton; Richard Collins; Gordon Robertson
4×100 m relay T42–46	Australia (AUS); Tim Matthews; Bradley Thomas; Neil Fuller; David Evans	Austria (AUT); Sven Reiger; Andreas Kramer; Manfred Hartl; Klaus Felser	United States (USA); Matthew Bulow; Thomas Bourgeois; Dennis Oehler; Douglas Collier
4x100m relay T52–53	Germany (GER)	None	None
4×400 m relay T10–12	Spain (ESP); Juan António Prieto; Sergio Sánchez; Enrique Sánchez–Guijo; José Antonio Sánchez	Germany (GER); Thomas Validis; Holger Geffers; Gerd Franzka; Ingo Geffers	United States (USA); Edward Munro; Kelvin Hogans; Winford Haynes; Craig Mallinckrodt
4×400 m relay T52–53	France (FRA); Claude Issorat; Philippe Couprie; Charles Tolle; Mustapha Badid	Switzerland (SUI); Franz Nietlispach; Heinz Frei; Guido Muller; Daniel Bogli	Canada (CAN); Jeffrey Adams; Carl Marquis; Marc Quessy; Colin Mathieson
High jump F10–11	Oleg Chepel; Belarus	Alejo Velez; Spain	Shigeo Yoshihara; Japan
High jump F42–44	Hou Bin; China	Alan Earle; Great Britain	Juergen Kern; Germany
Long jump F10	José Manuel Rodríguez; Spain	Sergey Sevostianov; Russia	Sen Wang; China
Long jump F11	Stephane Bozzolo; France	Moises Esmeralda; Spain	Juan Viedma; Spain
Long jump F12	Enrique Caballero; Cuba	Ihar Fartunau; Belarus	Kurt van Raefelghem; Belgium
Long jump F34–37	Darren Thrupp; Australia	Peter Haber; Germany	Douglas Amador; Brazil
Long jump F42	Lukas Christen; Switzerland	Gunther Belitz; Germany	Andreas Siegl; Austria
Long jump F44	Urs Kolly; Switzerland	Patrick Stoll; Switzerland	Bradley Thomas; Australia
Long jump F45–46	Ruben Alvarez; Spain	Adeoye Ajibola; Nigeria	Georgios Toptsis; Greece
Long jump MH	Nigel Bourne; Great Britain	Wissem Ben Bahri; Tunisia	Wardell Gadson; United States
Triple jump F10	José Manuel Rodríguez; Spain	Sen Wang; China	Victor Joukovski; Belarus
Triple jump F11	Juan Viedma; Spain	Wentao Huang; China	Igor Gorbenko; Ukraine
Triple jump F12	Enrique Caballero; Cuba	Ihar Fartunau; Belarus	Ulrich Striegel; Germany
Triple jump F45–46	Xuen Zhao; China	Florian Bohl; Germany	Ruben Alvarez; Spain
Club throw F50	Stephen Miller; Great Britain	James Richardson; Great Britain	Aaron Little; United States
Discus throw F10	Alfonso Fidalgo; Spain	Siegmund Turteltaube; Germany	N. Denissevitch; Belarus
Discus throw F11	Serguei Khodakov; Russia	Vasyl Lishchynskyi; Ukraine	Gueorgui Sakelarov; Bulgaria
Discus throw F12	Hai Tao Sun; China	Russell Short; Australia	Jason Delesalle; Canada
Discus throw F32–33	Andreas Mueller; Germany	Antoine Delaune; France	Stephen Eaton; Australia
Discus throw F34/37	James Shaw; Canada	Denton Johnson; United States	Paul Williams; Great Britain
Discus throw F35	Hossein Agha-Barghchi; Iran	Milan Kubala; Czech Republic	Willem Noorduin; Netherlands
Discus throw F36	Damien Burroughs; Australia	Abdel Jabbar Dhifallah; Tunisia	Anderson Santos; Brazil
Discus throw F41	Ahmed Dahy; Egypt	Nachman Wolf; Israel	Ahmed Abd Elgawad; Egypt
Discus throw F42	Gino de Keersmaeker; Belgium	Horst Beyer; Germany	John Eden; Australia
Discus throw F43–44	Shawn Brown; United States	Xiuqing Li; China	Klaus Kulla; Germany
Discus throw F46	Jerzy Dabrowski; Poland	Tomasz Rebisz; Poland	Ayman Abou Elata; Egypt
Discus throw F51	Ghader Modabber; Iran	Horácio Bascioni; Argentina	Douglas Heir; United States
Discus throw F52	Abdolreza Jokar; Iran	Imad Gharbawi; Jordan	Gabriel Diaz de Leon; United States
Discus throw F53	Leon Labuschagne; South Africa	Mokhtar Nourafshan; Iran	Francisco Jesus Mendez; Spain
Discus throw F54	Jacques Martin; Canada	Marc Fenn; United States	Sean O'Grady; Ireland
Discus throw F55	Steyn Humphries; South Africa	Mohammad Sadeghi Mehryar; Iran	Kevan Baker; Great Britain
Discus throw F56	Larry Hughes; United States	Maurizio Nalin; Italy	H. Abdel Latif; Egypt
Discus throw F57	Mohamed Gawad; Egypt	Hany Elbehiry; Egypt	Stephanus Lombaard; South Africa
Javelin throw F10	Mineho Ozaki; Japan	Vytautas Girnius; Lithuania	Richard Ruffalo; United States
Javelin throw F11	Miroslaw Pych; Poland	Siegmund Hegeholz; Germany	Mark Whiteley; Great Britain
Javelin throw F12	Hai Tao Sun; China	France Gagne; Canada	Thomas Validis; Germany
Javelin throw F34/37	Brian Harvey; Australia	Paul Williams; Great Britain	James Shaw; Canada
Javelin throw F35	Fahed Al–Mutairi; Kuwait	Keith Gardner; Great Britain	Yeon Choi; South Korea
Javelin throw F36	Kenneth Churchill; Great Britain	Jacobus Jonker; South Africa	Jaco Janse van Vuuren; South Africa
Javelin throw F41	Christopher Moori; Kenya	Ahmed Dahy; Egypt	Ahmed Abd Elgawad; Egypt
Javelin throw F42	Guillermo Perez; Cuba	Jakob Mathiasen; Denmark	Roberto Simonazzi] Germany
Javelin throw F43–44	Si Lao Ha; China	Lutovico Halagahu; France	Dirk Mimberg; Germany
Javelin throw F46	Joerg Schiedek; Germany	Patita Tuipoloto; France	Tomasz Rebisz; Poland
Javelin throw F51	Ghader Modabber; Iran	David MacCalman; New Zealand	Douglas Heir; United States
Javelin throw F52	Adrian Paz; Mexico	Peter Martin; New Zealand	Abdolreza Jokar; Iran
Javelin throw F53	Mokhtar Nourafshan; Iran	Rauno Saunavaara; Finland	Bruce Wallrodt; Australia
Javelin throw F54	Mikael Saleva; Finland	Jacques Martin; Canada	Janez Roškar; Slovenia
Javelin throw F55	Stefan Danko; Czech Republic	Robert Balk; United States	Mashal Al–Otaibi; Kuwait
Javelin throw F56	Mohammad Reza Mirzaei; Iran	Rostislav Pohlmann; Czech Republic	Steyn Humphries; South Africa
Javelin throw F57	Stephanus Lombaard; South Africa	Aly Mohamed; Kuwait	Mohamed Hassan; Egypt
Shot put F10	Alfonso Fidalgo; Spain	N. Denissevitch; Belarus	Andres Martinez; Spain
Shot put F11	Vasyl Lishchynskyi; Ukraine	Karl Mayr; Austria	Serguei Khodakov; Russia
Shot put F12	Hai Tao Sun; China	Russell Short; Australia	Rolandas Urbonas; Lithuania
Shot put F32–33	Hamish MacDonald; Australia	Andreas Mueller; Germany	Dan West; Great Britain
Shot put F34/37	James Shaw; Canada	Miroslav Janecek; Czech Republic	Roman Kolek; Czech Republic
Shot put F35	Willem Noorduin; Netherlands	Alex Hermans; Belgium	Wolfgang Dubin; Austria
Shot put F36	Gert van der Merwe; South Africa	Franjo Izlakar; Slovenia	Kenneth Churchill; Great Britain
Shot put F41	Ahmed Abd Elgawad; Egypt	Ashraf Elsafi; Egypt	Juan Lebrero; Spain
Shot put F42	Thierry Daubresse; Belgium	Detlef Eckert; Germany	Horst Beyer; Germany
Shot put F43–44	Lutovico Halagahu; France	Joerg Frischmann; Germany	Asa Ison; United States
Shot put F46	Jerzy Dabrowski; Poland	Tomasz Rebisz; Poland	Hongru Liu; China
Shot put F51	Ghader Modabber; Iran	Douglas Heir; United States	Hal Merrill; Canada
Shot put F52	Peter Martin; New Zealand	Josias Lima; Brazil	Mauro Maximo; Mexico
Shot put F53	Bruce Wallrodt; Australia	Mokhtar Nourafshan; Iran	Jerry Deets; United States
Shot put F54	Arnold Astrada; United States	David Dudley; Great Britain	Stefanos Anargyory; Greece
Shot put F55	Dimitrios Kostantakas; Greece	Mohammad Sadeghi Mehryar; Iran	Terry Giddy; Australia
Shot put F56	Michael Louwrens; South Africa	Steyn Humphries; South Africa	Maurizio Nalin; Italy
Shot put F57	Stephanus Lombaard; South Africa	Hany Elbehiry; Egypt	Shaaban El Khatib; Egypt
Pentathlon P10	Sergey Sevostianov; Russia	Rayk Haucke; Germany	Victor Joukovski; Belarus
Pentathlon P11	Miroslaw Pych; Poland	Stephane Bozzolo; France	Frantisek Godri; Slovakia
Pentathlon P12	Jason Delesalle; Canada	Kurt van Raefelghem; Belgium	Ihar Fartunau; Belarus
Pentathlon P42	Horst Beyer; Germany	Kerrod McGregor; Australia	Jakob Mathiasen; Denmark
Pentathlon P44	Urs Kolly; Switzerland	Thomas Bourgeois; United States	Douglas Collier; United States
Pentathlon P53–57	Maurizio Nalin; Italy	Robert Balk; United States	Jerry Deets; United States

=== Women's events ===
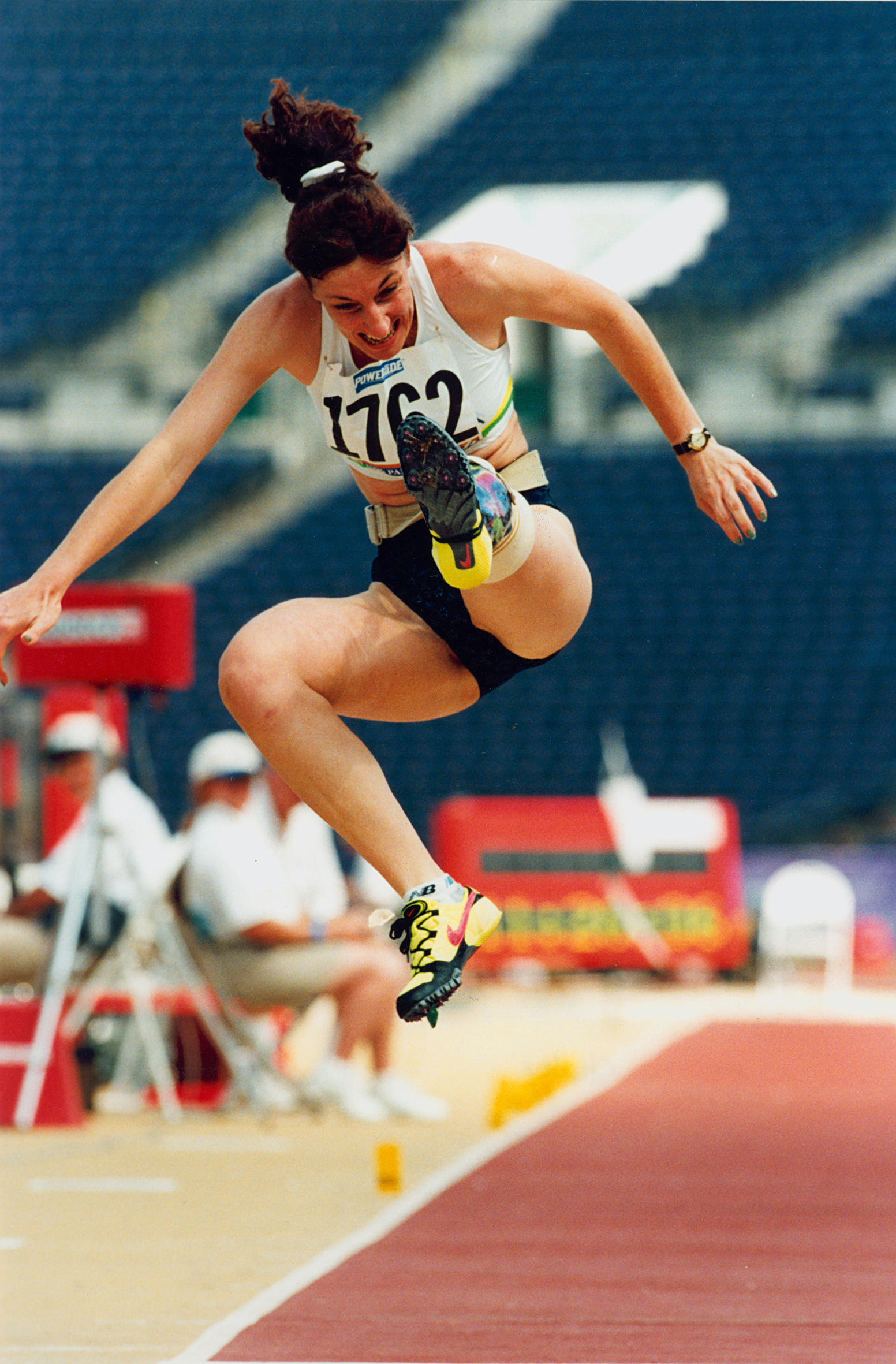
Australian athlete Frances Stanley competes in the F44 long jump event at the 1996 Atlanta Paralympic Games where she finished sixth

Event	Gold	Silver	Bronze
100 m T10	Purificacion Santamarta; Spain	Ádria Santos; Brazil	Raquel Díaz Caro; Spain
100 m T11	Beatriz Mendoza; Spain	Claire Brunotte; Germany	Maria José Alves; Brazil
100 m T32–33	Noriko Arai; Japan	Linda Mastandrea; United States	Sheila O'Neil; United States
100 m T34–35	Caroline Innes; Great Britain	Maria Alvarez; Spain	Cornelia Teubner; Germany
100 m T36–37	Katrina Webb; Australia	Isabelle Foerder; Germany	Alison Quinn; Australia
100 m T42–46	Annely Ojastu; Estonia	Jessica Sachse; Germany	Amy Winters; Australia
100 m T52	LeAnn Shannon; United States	Tanni Grey; Great Britain	Colette Bourgonje; Canada
100 m T53	Chantal Petitclerc; Canada	Cheri Becerra; United States	Nicola Jarvis; Great Britain
200 m MH	Sharon Rackham; Australia	Tracey Melesko; Canada	Lisa Llorens; Australia
200 m T10	Purificacion Santamarta; Spain	Ádria Santos; Brazil	Maria Ligorio; Italy
200 m T11	Beatriz Mendoza; Spain	Claire Brunotte; Germany	Maria José Alves; Brazil
200 m T32–33	Linda Mastandrea; United States	Noriko Arai; Japan	Mary Rice; Ireland
200 m T34–37	Katrina Webb; Australia	Isabelle Foerder; Germany	Alicia Martinez; Spain
200 m T42–46	Amy Winters; Australia	Annely Ojastu; Estonia	Iryna Leantsiuk; Belarus
200 m T51	Cristeen Smith; New Zealand	Leticia Torres; Mexico	Ursina Greuter; Switzerland
200 m T52	LeAnn Shannon; United States	Tanni Grey; Great Britain	Colette Bourgonje; Canada
200 m T53	Chantal Petitclerc; Canada	Cheri Becerra; United States	Nicola Jarvis; Great Britain
400 m T10	Purificacion Santamarta; Spain	Ádria Santos; Brazil	Maria Ligorio; Italy
400 m T11	Rima Batalova; Russia	Maria Ortega; Spain	Elena Jdanova; Russia
400 m T51	Ursina Greuter; Switzerland	Jean Waters; United States	Leticia Torres; Mexico
400 m T52	LeAnn Shannon; United States	Tanni Grey; Great Britain	Joelle Vogel; France
400 m T53	Louise Sauvage; Australia	Chantal Petitclerc; Canada	Cheri Becerra; United States
800 m T10–11	Rima Batalova; Russia	Claudia Meier; Germany	Sigita Markevičienė; Lithuania
800 m T51	Teruyo Tanaka; Japan	Cristeen Smith; New Zealand	Ursina Greuter; Switzerland
800 m T52	Tanni Grey; Great Britain	LeAnn Shannon; United States	Ann Walters; United States
800 m T53	Louise Sauvage; Australia	Chantal Petitclerc; Canada	Cheri Becerra; United States
1500 m T10–11	Rima Batalova; Russia	Claudia Meier; Germany	Sigita Markevičienė; Lithuania
1500 m T52–53	Louise Sauvage; Australia	Chantal Petitclerc; Canada	Jean Driscoll; United States
3000 m T10–11	Rima Batalova; Russia	Claudia Meier; Germany	Samanta Meneghelli; Italy
5000 m T52–53	Louise Sauvage; Australia	Jean Driscoll; United States	Kazu Hatanaka; Japan
10,000 m T52–53	Jean Driscoll; United States	Kazu Hatanaka; Japan	Lily Anggreny; Germany
Marathon T52–53	Jean Driscoll; United States	Kazu Hatanaka; Japan	DeAnna Sodoma; United States
Long jump F10–11	Magdalena Amo; Spain	Rosalia Lazaro; Spain	Purificacion Ortiz; Spain
Long jump F34–37	Aldona Grigaliuniene; Lithuania	Katrina Webb; Australia	Carmen Storch; Germany
Long jump F42–46	Iryna Leantsiuk; Belarus	Annely Ojastu; Estonia	Alice Basford; Great Britain
Long jump MH	Lisa Llorens; Australia	Tracey Melesko; Canada	Malle Juhkam; Estonia
Discus throw F10–11	Liiudys Beliser; Cuba	Hong Yan Xu; China	Ljiljana Ljubisic; Canada
Discus throw F12	Bridie Lynch; Ireland	Courtney Knight; Canada	Tamara Sivakova; Belarus
Discus throw F34–35	Ellen Hyman; United States	María Angélica Rodríguez; Argentina	Kris Hodgins; Canada
Discus throw F41	Malda Baumgartė; Lithuania	Araceli Castro; Mexico	Catalina Rosales; Mexico
Discus throw F42–44/46	Jennifer Barrett; United States	Hong Ping Wu; China	Britta Jaenicke; Germany
Discus throw F53–54	Marianne Buggenhagen; Germany	Laura Schwanger; United States	Martina Willing; Germany
Discus throw F55–57	Karima Feleifal; Egypt	Mervat Omar; Egypt	Suely Guimarães; Brazil
Javelin throw F10–11	Marianne van Brussel; Belgium	Liiudys Beliser; Cuba	Yadviha Skorabahataya; Belarus
Javelin throw F42–44/46	Andrea Scherney; Austria	Tatiana Mezinova; Russia	Natalia Kletskova; Russia
Javelin throw F53–54	Martina Willing; Germany	Laura Schwanger; United States	Marianne Buggenhagen; Germany
Javelin throw F55–57	Zakia Abdin; Egypt	Mary Nakhumicha; Kenya	Sylvia Grant; Jamaica
Shot put F10–11	Hong Yan Xu; China	Jodi Willis-Roberts; Australia	Ljiljana Ljubisic; Canada
Shot put F12	Tamara Sivakova; Belarus	Marla Runyan; United States	Bridie Lynch; Ireland
Shot put F32–33	Birgit Pohl; Germany	Janice Lawton; Great Britain	Sharon Rice; Ireland
Shot put F41	Malda Baumgartė; Lithuania	Catalina Rosales; Mexico	Grainne Barrett–Condron; Ireland
Shot put F42–44/46	Hong Ping Wu; China	Britta Jaenicke; Germany	Jennifer Barrett; United States
Shot put F53–54	Marianne Buggenhagen; Germany	Laura Schwanger; United States	Martina Willing; Germany
Shot put F55–57	Mervat Omar; Egypt	Zakia Abdin; Egypt	Sohir Elkoumy; Egypt
Pentathlon P10–12	Marla Runyan; United States	Olga Tchourkina; Russia	Helena Silm; Estonia
