= South Africa at the 1996 Summer Paralympics =

- IPC code: RSA
- NPC: South African Sports Confederation and Olympic Committee
- Website: www.sascoc.co.za

in Atlanta
- Competitors: 40 (29 men and 11 women)
- Medals Ranked 15th: Gold 10 Silver 8 Bronze 10 Total 28

Summer Paralympics appearances (overview)
- 1964; 1968; 1972; 1976; 1980–1988; 1992; 1996; 2000; 2004; 2008; 2012; 2016; 2020; 2024

40 athletes (29 men and 11 women) from South Africa competed at the 1996 Summer Paralympics in Atlanta, United States and finished 15th on the medal table.

== Medallists ==
Medal	Name	Sport	Event
Gold	Malcolm Pringle	Athletics	Men's 800m T37
Gold	Leon Labuschagne	Athletics	Men's discus F53
Gold	Steyn Humphries	Athletics	Men's discus F55
Gold	Stephanus Lombaard	Athletics	Men's javelin F57
Gold	Gert van der Merwe	Athletics	Men's shot put F36
Gold	Michael Louwrens	Athletics	Men's shot put F56
Gold	Stephanus Lombaard	Athletics	Men's shot put F57
Gold	Deirdre Buller	Lawn bowls	Women's singles LB6
Gold	Ebert Kleynhans	Swimming	Men's 50m freestyle B3
Gold	Jean-Jacques Terblanche	Swimming	Men's 200m medley SM8
Silver	Malcolm Pringle	Athletics	Men's 400m T37
Silver	Malcolm Pringle	Athletics	Men's 1500m T34-37
Silver	Jacobus Jonker	Athletics	Men's javelin F36
Silver	Steyn Humphries	Athletics	Men's shot put F56
Silver	Willem Niemann	Lawn bowls	Men's singles LB2
Silver	Ronald Philipps	Lawn bowls	Men's singles LB6
Silver	Tadhg Slattery	Swimming	Men's 100m breaststroke SB5
Silver	Ebert Kleynhans	Swimming	Men's 100m freestyle B3
Bronze	Daniel Louw	Athletics	Men's 200m T45-46
Bronze	Stephanus Lombaard	Athletics	Men's discus F57
Bronze	Jaco Janse van Vuuren	Athletics	Men's javelin F36
Bronze	Steyn Humphries	Athletics	Men's javelin F56
Bronze	Margaret Harriman	Lawn bowls	Women's singles LB2
Bronze	Rosabelle Riese	Shooting	Women's air pistol SH1
Bronze	Craig Groenewald	Swimming	Men's 50m freestyle MH
Bronze	Jean-Jacques Terblanche	Swimming	Men's 100m butterfly S8
Bronze	Craig Groenewald	Swimming	Men's 100m freestyle MH
Bronze	Elizabeth Prinsloo	Swimming	Women's 50m freestyle S10

== See also ==
- South Africa at the Paralympics
- South Africa at the 1996 Summer Olympics
