= Cuba at the 1996 Summer Paralympics =

- IPC code: CUB
- NPC: Comité Paralimpico Cubano

in Atlanta
- Competitors: 10 (9 men and 1 woman)
- Medals Ranked 23rd: Gold 8 Silver 3 Bronze 0 Total 11

Summer Paralympics appearances (overview)
- 1992; 1996; 2000; 2004; 2008; 2012; 2016; 2020; 2024

Ten athletes (nine men and one woman) from Cuba competed at the 1996 Summer Paralympics in Atlanta, United States. Competitors from Cuba won 11 medals, including 8 golds and 3 silvers to finish 23rd in the medal table. All their medals were won in athletics.

== Medallists ==
Medal	Name	Sport	Event
Gold	Omar Moya	Athletics	Men's 200m T11
Gold	Omar Moya	Athletics	Men's 400m T11
Gold	Ambrosio Zaldivar	Athletics	Men's 400m T12
Gold	Diosmani Gonzalez	Athletics	Men's 10000m T12
Gold	Enrique Caballero	Athletics	Men's long jump F12
Gold	Enrique Caballero	Athletics	Men's triple jump F12
Gold	Guillermo Perez	Athletics	Men's javelin F42
Gold	Liiudys Beliser	Athletics	Women's discus F10-11
Silver	Enrique Caballero	Athletics	Men's 100m T12
Silver	Diosmani Gonzalez	Athletics	Men's 5000m T12
Silver	Liiudys Beliser	Athletics	Women's javelin F10-11

== See also ==
- Cuba at the Paralympics
- Cuba at the 1996 Summer Olympics
