= Ivory Coast at the Paralympics =

- Flag of Ivory Coast
- IPC code: CIV
- NPC: Fédération Ivoirienne des Sports Paralympiques
- Medals: Gold 3 Silver 1 Bronze 1 Total 5

Summer appearances
- 1996; 2000; 2004; 2008; 2012; 2016; 2020; 2024

Ivory Coast first competed at the Paralympic Games in 1996. It has participated in every Summer Paralympics since then, but has never taken part in the Winter Paralympics. Côte d'Ivoire has won four Paralympic medals, three gold and one bronze, all in the sport of track and field athletics. All three of the gold medals were won by Oumar Basakoulba Kone.

Ivory Coast will be taking part in the 2012 Summer Paralympics, and the Fédération Ivoirienne des Sports Paralympiques have chosen Bedford as the UK training base for its Paralympians.

== Medalists ==
Medal	Name	Games	Sport	Event
Gold	Oumar Basakoulba Kone	1996 Atlanta	Athletics	Men's 400 metres T42-46
Gold	Oumar Basakoulba Kone	1996 Atlanta	Athletics	Men's 800 metres T44-46
Gold	Oumar Basakoulba Kone	2000 Sydney	Athletics	Men's 800 metres T46
Silver	Fatimata Diasso	2016 Rio	Athletics	Women's Long Jump F11
Bronze	Paul Fernand Kra Koffi	2000 Sydney	Athletics	Men's 800 metres T12
