= Ivory Coast at the 2000 Summer Paralympics =

- Flag of Ivory Coast
- IPC code: CIV
- NPC: Fédération Ivoirienne des Sports Paralympiques

in Sydney
- Competitors: 2 in 1 sport
- Flag bearer: Oumar Basakoulba Kone
- Medals Ranked 48th: Gold 1 Silver 0 Bronze 1 Total 2

Summer Paralympics appearances (overview)
- 1996; 2000; 2004; 2008; 2012; 2016; 2020; 2024

Ivory Coast competed at the 2000 Summer Paralympics. The country, competing at only their second Paralympic Games, was represented by 2 male athletes. These were the country's second appearance at the Paralympic Games.

== Medallists ==
Medal	Name	Sport	Event
Gold	Oumar Basakoulba Kone	Athletics	Men's 800m T46
Bronze	Paul Fernand Kra Koffi	Athletics	Men's 800m T12

== See also ==
- Ivory Coast at the 2000 Summer Olympics
- Ivory Coast at the Paralympics

== Bibliography ==
- International Paralympic Committee (2000). "Appendix C: Athlete Numbers - By Delegation". Sydney 2000 Paralympic Games Post Games Report. Sydney.
