= Athletics at the 1996 Summer Paralympics – Men's 4 × 100 m relay T52–53 =

Men's 4×100 m relay T52–53 at the X Paralympic Games
- Paralympic Athletics
- Competitors: 7 from 7 nations

Medalists
1st place, gold medalist(s)		Germany	Germany

The Men's 4 × 100 m relay T52–53 was one of the events held in Athletics at the 1996 Summer Paralympics in Atlanta. It was a relay race for wheelchair sprinters. Each participating team consisted in four athletes.

Seven countries took part, and were divided between two qualifying heats.

Germany won the first heat, setting a Paralympic record with a time of 54.81s. Canada also advanced, finishing second in 55.51s. The Canadians edged out the team from Switzerland by 0.1s. Great Britain finished last in 56.26s. The Swiss and British teams were eliminated.

In heat two, Mexico were disqualified. France and the United States therefore needed simply to complete the race in order to advance. The French team won the heat, establishing a new world record in 53.02s. The Americans finished in 54.21s, also advancing to the final.

In the final, the American, French and Canadian teams were all disqualified. The Germans completed the race in 56.05s, and thus obtained the gold medal. No silver or bronze medals were awarded.

Rank	Nation	Time in the final
1st place, gold medalist(s)	Germany (GER)	56.05s
2nd place, silver medalist(s)	no silver medal awarded	-
3rd place, bronze medalist(s)	no bronze medal awarded	-
