= China at the 1996 Summer Paralympics =

- IPC code: CHN
- NPC: China Administration of Sports for Persons with Disabilities
- Website: www.caspd.org.cn

in Atlanta
- Competitors: 37 in 6 sports
- Medals Ranked 9th: Gold 16 Silver 13 Bronze 10 Total 39

Summer Paralympics appearances (overview)
- 1984; 1988; 1992; 1996; 2000; 2004; 2008; 2012; 2016; 2020; 2024

China competed at the 1996 Summer Paralympics, held in Atlanta, Georgia, United States.

== Medalists ==
Medal	Name	Sport	Event
Gold	Bin Hou	Athletics	Men's high jump F42-44
Gold	Xueen Zhao	Athletics	Men's triple jump F45-46
Gold	Hai Tao Sun	Athletics	Men's discus F12
Gold	Hai Tao Sun	Athletics	Men's javelin F12
Gold	Si Lao Ha	Athletics	Men's javelin F43-44
Gold	Hai Tao Sun	Athletics	Men's shot put F12
Gold	Hong Yan Xu	Athletics	Women's shot put F10-11
Gold	Hong Ping Wu	Athletics	Women's shot put F42-44/46
Gold	Hai Dong Zhang	Powerlifting	Men's 67.5 kg
Gold	Zhiqiang Luo	Powerlifting	Men's 100 kg
Gold	Weiming Zhu	Swimming	Men's 100m backstroke S6
Gold	Baoren Gong	Swimming	Men's 100m breaststroke SB7
Gold	Tieyin Shi	Swimming	Women's 100m breaststroke SB8
Gold	Xiaoling Zhang	Table tennis	Women's open 6–10
Gold	Fuqun Luo	Table tennis	Women's singles 9
Gold	Xiaoling Zhang; Fuqun Luo	Table tennis	Women's teams 6–10
Silver	Yanjian Wu	Athletics	Men's 1500m T44-46
Silver	Yanjian Wu	Athletics	Men's 5000m T44-46
Silver	Sen Wang	Athletics	Men's triple jump F10
Silver	Wentao Huang	Athletics	Men's triple jump F11
Silver	Xiuqing Li	Athletics	Men's discus F43-44
Silver	Hong Yan Xu	Athletics	Women's discus F10-11
Silver	Hong Ping Wu	Athletics	Women's discus F42-44/46
Silver	Run Ming Men	Judo	Men's 95 kg
Silver	Jian Wang	Powerlifting	Men's 52 kg
Silver	Nan Zhang	Shooting	Women's air rifle standing SH1
Silver	Qiwen Mao	Swimming	Men's 50m butterfly S5
Silver	Kai Xia	Swimming	Men's 50m butterfly S6
Silver	Qiwen Mao; Kai Xia; Hua Bin Zeng; Weiming Zhu	Swimming	Men's 4 x 50m medley S1-6
Bronze	Sen Wang	Athletics	Men's long jump F10
Bronze	Hongru Liu	Athletics	Men's shot put F46
Bronze	Baoji Cui	Judo	Men's 71 kg
Bronze	Jiahua Zhou	Powerlifting	Men's 82.5 kg
Bronze	Yongzhong Guo	Swimming	Men's 100m breaststroke SB8
Bronze	Weiming Zhu; Qiwen Mao; Hua Bin Zeng; Kai Xia	Swimming	Men's 4 x 50m freestyle S1-6
Bronze	Qiming Dong	Swimming	Women's 100m backstroke B1
Bronze	Xiangrong Zhou	Swimming	Women's 100m backstroke S6
Bronze	Fuqun Luo	Table tennis	Women's open 6–10
Bronze	Xiaoling Zhang	Table tennis	Women's singles 6–8

== Athletes ==
=== Multi medallists ===
Medallists who have won more than two medals in the games.

- Yanjian Wu: 2 silver medals (Athletics - track)
- Hai Tao Sun: 3 gold medals (Athletics - field)
- Fuqun Luo: 2 gold medals and 1 bronze (Table tennis)
- Xiaoling Zhang: 2 gold medals and 1 bronze (Table tennis)

== See also ==
- China at the Paralympics
- China at the 1996 Summer Olympics
- Sports in China
