= Alicia Martinez =

Alicia Martinez may refer to:

- Alicia Austria-Martinez (born 1940), Filipino jurist
- Alicia Martinez (athlete), Spanish Paralympic athlete
