= IPass =

IPass may refer to:

- I-Pass, an electronic toll collection system in Illinois, United States
- iPASS (Taiwan), a contactless smartcard used in Taiwan
- iPass (company), a technology company headquartered in California, United States
- A mini-SAS electrical connector
