= Swimming at the 1996 Summer Paralympics – Men's 100 metre freestyle B3 =

Men's 100m Freestyle B3 at the X Paralympic Games
- Competitors: 11 from 6 nations

Medalists
1st place, gold medalist(s)		Walter Wu	Canada
2nd place, silver medalist(s)		Ebert Kleynhans	South Africa
3rd place, bronze medalist(s)		Vladmir Tchesnov	Russia

The men's 100m freestyle B3 event at the 1996 Summer Paralympics consisted of 11 competing athletes. The swimmers with the top 8 times in the pool advanced to the finals. Walter Wu received a gold medal, breaking a Paralympic record. Ebert Kleynhans and Vladmir Tchesnov came second and third respectively.

== Results ==
Q = qualified for final. WR = World Record. PR = Paralympic Record. AM = Americas Record. AF = African Record.

=== Heats ===
Rank	Lane	Name	Nationality	Time	Notes
1	4	Walter Wu	Canada	58.24	Q, PR
2	6	Ebert Kleynhans	South Africa	1:00.07	Q
3	3	Noel Pederson	Norway	1:00.13	Q
4	2	Flemming Berthelson	Denmark	1:00.25	Q
5	5	Ian Sharpe	Great Britain	1:00.38	Q
6	5	Christopher Fox	Great Britain	1:00.41	Q
7	7	Vladmir Tchesnov	Russia	1:00.51	Q
8	1	Ivan Nielsen	Denmark	1:01.27	Q
9	1	Dervis Konuralp	Great Britain	1:02.65	
10	1	Edouard Tchaoune	Russia	1:03.59	
12	1	Dmitri Kravtsevich	Belarus	1:04.38	

==== Finals ====
Rank	Lane	Name	Nationality	Time	Notes
1	4	Walter Wu	Canada	57.63	PR
2	6	Ebert Kleynhans	South Africa	58.77	
3	3	Vladmir Tchesno	Russia	59.27	
4	2	Flemming Berthelson	Denmark	59.49	
5	5	Noel Pederson	Norway	59.55	
6	5	Ian Sharpe	Great Britain	59.77	
7	7	Christopher Fox	Great Britain	1:00.41	
8	1	Ivan Nielsen	Denmark	1:01.96	
