= Tunisia at the 1996 Summer Paralympics =

- IPC code: TUN
- NPC: Tunisian Paralympic Committee

in Atlanta
- Competitors: 3 (2 men and 1 woman)
- Medals: Gold 0 Silver 2 Bronze 0 Total 2

Summer Paralympics appearances (overview)
- 1988; 1992; 1996; 2000; 2004; 2008; 2012; 2016; 2020; 2024

Three athletes (two men and one woman) from Tunisia competed at the 1996 Summer Paralympics in Atlanta, United States. The silver medals were won in athletics.

== Medallists ==
Medal	Name	Sport	Event
Silver	Wissem Ben Bahri	Athletics	Men's long jump MH
Silver	Abdel Jabbar Dhifallah	Athletics	Men's discus F36

== See also ==
- Tunisia at the Paralympics
- Tunisia at the 1996 Summer Olympics
