= Ivory Coast at the 2004 Summer Paralympics =

- Flag of Ivory Coast
- IPC code: CIV
- NPC: Fédération Ivoirienne des Sports Paralympiques

in Athens
- Competitors: 2 in 2 sports
- Flag bearer: Alidou Diamoutene
- Medals: Gold 0 Silver 0 Bronze 0 Total 0

Summer Paralympics appearances (overview)
- 1996; 2000; 2004; 2008; 2012; 2016; 2020; 2024

Côte d'Ivoire competed at the 2004 Summer Paralympics in Athens, Greece. These were their third Games. They were represented by two male athletes who did not medal.

== Team ==
The team included two athletes, both of them male, and won no medals.

== Sports ==
=== Athletics ===
==== Men's track ====
Athlete	Class	Event	Heats		Semifinal		Final	
Athlete	Class	Event	Result	Rank	Result	Rank	Result	Rank
Oumar Basakoulba Kone	T46	400m	52.11	2 Q	—		50.72	4
Oumar Basakoulba Kone	T46	800m	2:04.12	8 Q	—		1:59.78	6

=== Powerlifting ===
Athlete	Event	Result	Rank
Alidou Diamoutene	Men's 48kg	130.0	7

== See also ==
- Côte d'Ivoire at the Paralympics
- Côte d'Ivoire at the 2004 Summer Olympics
