= Athletics at the 2008 Summer Paralympics – Men's 800 metres T46 =

The Men's 800m T46 had its First Round held on September 14 at 20:27 and the Final on September 15 at 17:24.

== Medalists ==
Gold	Marcin Awizen; Poland
Silver	Samir Nouioua; Algeria
Bronze	Abderrahman Ait Khamouch; Spain

== Results ==
Place	Athlete	Round 1	Final
1	Marcin Awizen (POL)	1:39.38 Q	1:52.36 WR
2	Samir Nouioua (ALG)	1:59.20 Q	1:52.97
3	Abderrahman Ait Khamouch (ESP)	2:00.67 Q	1:53.68
4	Mohamed Fouzai (TUN)	2:00.78 Q	1:53.75
5	Stephen Wambua Musyoki (KEN)	1:56.12 Q	1:54.63
6	Simon Wambugu (KEN)	1:59.95 q	1:57.86
7	Alexander Yalchik (RUS)	1:57.06 q	1:58.04
8	Ahmed Ferhat (MAR)	1:56.77 Q	2:01.86
9	Wojciech Golaski (POL)	2:30.06 q	DNF
10	Ernesto Blanco (CUB)	2:00.05	
11	Michael Roeger (AUS)	2:00.40	
12	Ning Qin (CHN)	2:01.08	
13	Samuel Colmenares (VEN)	2:01.13	
14	Shantha Sirimana Arachchillage (SRI)	2:01.20	
15	Emicarlo Souza (BRA)	2:01.26	
16	Oleh Leshchyshyn (UKR)	2:01.58	
17	Jose Monteiro (POR)	2:01.69	
18	Jean de Dieu Nkundabera (RWA)	2:02.12	
19	Driss Ouguerd (MAR)	2:04.51	
20	Jose Carlos Alecrim (BRA)	2:06.37	
	Oumar Basakoulba Kone (CIV)	DNF	
	Hamza Rehouni (ALG)	DSQ	
