= Ivory Coast at the 2008 Summer Paralympics =

- Flag of Ivory Coast
- IPC code: CIV
- NPC: Fédération Ivoirienne des Sports Paralympiques

in Beijing
- Competitors: 3 in 2 sports
- Flag bearer: Oumar Basakoulba Kone
- Medals: Gold 0 Silver 0 Bronze 0 Total 0

Summer Paralympics appearances (overview)
- 1996; 2000; 2004; 2008; 2012; 2016; 2020; 2024

Ivory Coast sent a delegation to compete at the 2008 Summer Paralympics in Beijing, People's Republic of China.

== Sports ==
=== Athletics ===
==== Men's track ====
Athlete	Class	Event	Heats		Final	
Athlete	Class	Event	Result	Rank	Result	Rank
Addoh Frederic Kimou	T46	400m	50.34	9	did not advance	
Oumar Basakoulba Kone	T46	400m	52.91	14	did not advance	
Oumar Basakoulba Kone	T46	800m	DNF		did not advance	

=== Powerlifting ===
Athlete	Event	Result	Rank
Alidou Diamoutene	48kg	142.5	7

== See also ==
- Ivory Coast at the Paralympics
- Ivory Coast at the 2008 Summer Olympics
