= Ivory Coast at the 1996 Summer Paralympics =

- Flag of Ivory Coast
- IPC code: CIV
- NPC: Fédération Ivoirienne des Sports Paralympiques

in Atlanta
- Competitors: 2
- Medals Ranked 42nd: Gold 2 Silver 0 Bronze 0 Total 2

Summer Paralympics appearances (overview)
- 1996; 2000; 2004; 2008; 2012; 2016; 2020; 2024

Ivory Coast competed at the 1996 Summer Paralympics. The country made their Paralympic debut in Atlanta, United States., and were represented by 2 male athletes.

== Medallists ==
Medal	Name	Sport	Event
Gold	Oumar Basakoulba Kone	Athletics	Men's 400m T42-46
Gold	Oumar Basakoulba Kone	Athletics	Men's 800m T44-46

== See also ==
- Côte d'Ivoire at the Paralympics
- Côte d'Ivoire at the 1996 Summer Olympics
