= Vladimir Tchesnov =

Russian Paralympic swimmer

Medal record

Men's swimming

Representing Russia

Paralympic Games
Bronze medal – third place	1996 Atlanta	100 m freestyle B3

Vladimir Tchesnov is a paralympic swimmer from Russia competing mainly in category B3 events.

Vladimir competed as part of the Russian Paralympic swimming team at the 1996 Summer Paralympics winning a bronze medal in the 100m freestyle, he also finished fourth in both of his other events the 100m butterfly and 50m freestyle.
