= Matthew Bulow =

American paralympic athlete and sitting volleyball player

Personal information
- Spouse: Lacey Bulow
- Children: 3

Sport
- Country: United States
- Sport: Para-athletics; Sitting volleyball
Medal record
Representing United States
Paralympic Games
Para-athletics
Bronze medal – third place	1988 Seoul	Men's 4×100 m relay A2/A4–7
Bronze medal – third place	1988 Seoul	Men's long jump A4/A9
Bronze medal – third place	1992 Barcelona	Men's long jump J2
Bronze medal – third place	1996 Atlanta	Men's 4×100 m relay T42–46

Matthew Bulow is an American paralympic athlete and volleyball player. He participated at the 1988, 1992 and 1996 Summer Paralympics.

== Life and career ==
Bulow is the son of Frank Bulow. He had his right leg removed after being diagnosed with bone cancer at the age of fourteen. After it was removed, he wore a prosthetic leg. Bulow attended Tennessee Technological University, where he earned his bachelor's degree. While there he was a member of the Golden Eagles tennis team, which won the 1988 U.S. National Amputee tennis championship.

Bulow represented the United States at the 1988 Summer Paralympics. He won the bronze medal in the men's long jump A4/A9 event, and the bronze medal in the men's 4×100 m relay A2/A4–7 event, along with Ronnie Alsup, Rick Hoang and Dennis Oehler. He also competed in the men's 100 m and 200 m A4/A9 events, and the men's sitting volleyball.

Bulow also competed at the 1992 Summer Paralympics, winning bronze medals in the men's long jump J2 event, and (along with Thomas Bourgeois, Dennis Oehler and Douglas Collier) in the men's 4×100 m relay T42–46. He competed in the men's 100 m and 200 m TS2 events, and the men's long jump F44 event at the 1996 Summer Paralympics.

Bulow trained as a prosthetist at the Feinberg School of Medicine. He resides in Nashville, Tennessee.
