= Mexico at the 1996 Summer Paralympics =

- IPC code: MEX
- NPC: Federacion Mexicana de Deporte

in Atlanta
- Competitors: 38 (28 men and 10 women)
- Medals Ranked 31st: Gold 3 Silver 5 Bronze 4 Total 12

Summer Paralympics appearances (overview)
- 1972; 1976; 1980; 1984; 1988; 1992; 1996; 2000; 2004; 2008; 2012; 2016; 2020; 2024

38 athletes (28 men and 10 women) from Mexico competed at the 1996 Summer Paralympics in Atlanta, United States. Mexico won three gold medals, five silver and three bronze.

== Medallists ==
Medal	Name	Sport	Event
Gold	Saúl Mendoza	Athletics	Men's 5000m T52-53
Gold	Alejandro Guerrero	Athletics	Men's 10000m T10
Gold	Adrián Paz Velázquez	Athletics	Men's javelin F52
Silver	Alejandro Guerrero	Athletics	Men's 5000m T10
Silver	Leticia Torres	Athletics	Women's 200m T51
Silver	Araceli Castro	Athletics	Women's discus F41
Silver	Catalina Rosales	Athletics	Women's shot put F41
Silver	María Cristina Hoffmann	Table tennis	Women's singles 5
Bronze	Nicolas Ledezma	Athletics	Men's marathon T10
Bronze	Mauro Maximo	Athletics	Men's shot put F52
Bronze	Leticia Torres	Athletics	Women's 400m T51
Bronze	Catalina Rosales	Athletics	Women's discus F41

== See also ==
- Mexico at the Paralympics
- Mexico at the 1996 Summer Olympics
