= Athletics at the 2008 Summer Paralympics – Men's 400 metres T46 =

2008 Summer Paralympics event

The Men's 400m T46 had its First Round held on September 11 at 17:45 and the Final on September 12 at 18:42.

== Medalists ==
Gold	Heath Francis; Australia
Silver	Antonis Aresti; Cyprus
Bronze	Samuel Colmenares; Venezuela

== Results ==
Place	Athlete	Round 1	Final
1	Heath Francis (AUS)	49.39 Q	47.69 WR
2	Antonis Aresti (CYP)	49.74 Q	48.87
3	Samuel Colmenares (VEN)	49.60 Q	49.51
4	Emicarlo Souza (BRA)	50.06 q	49.54
5	Gunther Matzinger (AUT)	49.43 Q	49.56
6	Yury Nosulenko (RUS)	49.90 q	49.66
7	Simon Wambugu (KEN)	50.48 Q	53.32
8	Bashiru Yunusa (NGR)	50.20 Q	DNS
9	Addoh Frederic Kimou (CIV)	50.34	
10	Willy Martinez (VEN)	50.87	
11	Shantha Sirimana Arachchillage (SRI)	51.08	
12	Samuele Gobbi (ITA)	51.60	
13	Fethi Saidi (TUN)	52.26	
14	Oumar Basakoulba Kone (CIV)	52.91	
15	Yohansson Nascimento (BRA)	59.76	
