= Bradley Thomas (athlete) =

Australian Paralympic athlete

Bradley James Thomas
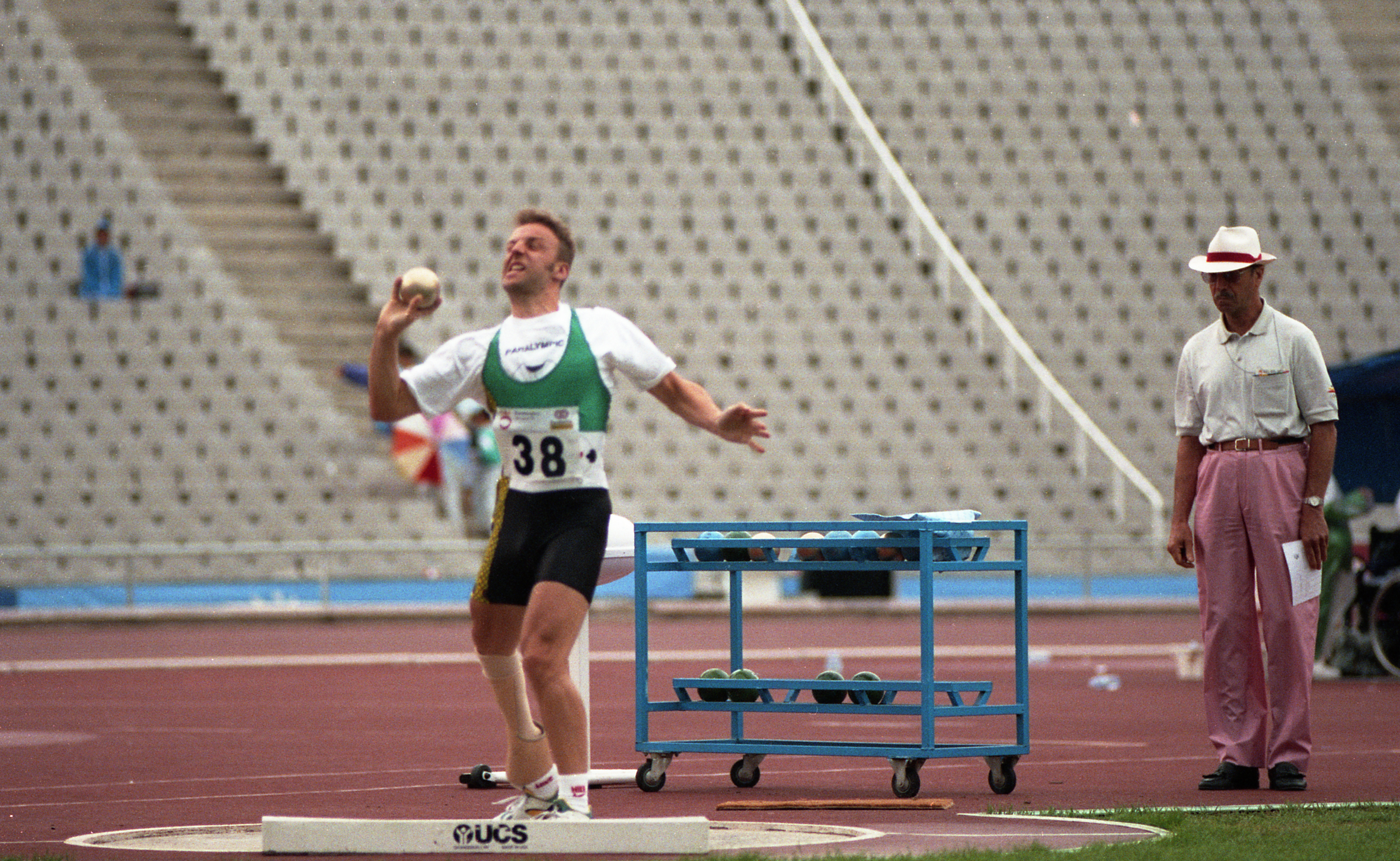
- Thomas Bradley throwing shot put, 1992 Paralympics

Personal information
- Full name: Bradley James Thomas
- Nationality: Australia
- Born: 1 April 1967 (age 59) Hobart, Tasmania
Medal record
Athletics
Paralympic Games
Gold medal – first place	1996 Atlanta	Men's 4x100 m Relay T42–46
Silver medal – second place	1988 Seoul	Men's Pentathlon A4A9
Bronze medal – third place	1996 Atlanta	Men's 100 m T43–44
Bronze medal – third place	1996 Atlanta	Men's Long Jump F44
IPC Athletics World Championships
Bronze medal – third place	1998 Birmingham	Men's Long Jump F44

Bradley James Thomas, OAM, (born 1 April 1967) was an Australian Paralympic Athlete who competed in three Paralympic competitions between 1988 and 1996 in an athletic career that spanned 15 years. Thomas was born in Hobart, the capital city of Tasmania. Whilst competing at these Paralympic Games, Thomas received 4 Paralympic medals (1 gold, 1 silver and 2 bronze). He was in the T44 (classification) and F44 (classification) for his disability and competed in many events. He was awarded the Medal of the Order of Australia in 1997 and also was inducted into the Tasmanian Hall of Fame in 2006. Thomas is currently working in Sydney as CEO of Prophecy International as well CEO of two wholly owned subsidiaries of Prophecy international, eMite and Snare Solutions.

== Early life ==
Bradley Thomas was born on 1 April 1967 in Hobart, Tasmania. He completed high school from Rosny College, a secondary school located in Hobart, in which he attended the school from 1981 to 1983. After completing high school, he transitioned into a Sales Cadet role for AMP Limited, where he worked for 5 years between 1983 and 1988. During this period he also had the chance to represent Australia in the Paralympics for Athletics. Thomas was first notice by athletics officials in 1986, where he competed at the Domain Athletics Centre in track and field events against able-bodied competitors. This attention brought a forward an opportunity to train and be selected for his debut Paralympics in 1988 at the Seoul Paralympic Games.

== Paralympic career ==
The Paralympic Games became official in 1960, in Rome. The Games consisted of 400 athletes from 23 countries and since these games, the Paralympics has taken place every 4 years, similarly to the Olympics.

Thomas' Paralympic career became official, with his debut at the 1988 Seoul Paralympic Games and he competed in many different classification events as Paralympic athletes compete against other classes with similar disabilities. Thomas' classification fell into the T44 (classification), as classified by the International Paralympic Committee, which is athletes with mild limb loss, muscle weakness or restrictions in the legs who don't use any prosthetics. His classification into this class was as a result of his right leg having an amputation below the knee resulting in the need of a prosthetic leg. This is the classification that the Paralympics currently use, however when Thomas first competed the classifications were different and as such Thomas' classification is different for the 1988 Seoul Paralympics and the 1992 Barcelona Paralympics.

Thomas's Paralympic debut was competing in the Men's Pentathlon A4A9 at the 1988 Seoul Paralympics where he placed second overall gaining a silver medal. The Seoul Summer Paralympics marked the first time in 24 years where the Paralympics took place in the same venue as the Olympics. It took place from 15 to 24 October 1988 and saw 3,041 Para Athletes, 2,370 men and 671 women from 60 countries competed at these Paralympics which at the time was a record attendance. There were 18 sports competed in, which saw 733 medals awarded, with 971 world records and 156 Paralympic records broken. The Opening Ceremony for the Paralympics took place at the Olympic Stadium where 75,000 people watched the ceremony.

His second Paralympics took place at the Barcelona 1992 Paralympics, Thomas competed in the Men's Pentathlon again, as well as the 100m sprint and Men's Long Jump. The Barcelona Summer Paralympics was another pivotal time for the Paralympics with for the first time, the games were available daily on domestic TV coverage. It took place from 3 to 14 September 1992 and saw 2,999 Para Athletes, 2,300 men and 699 women. There were 16 sports competed in, which saw 489 medal events, with 279 world records and 489 Paralympic records broken. The Opening Ceremony for the Paralympics took place at the Montjuic Olympic Stadium where 65,000 people watched the ceremony. These games were the last games to be organised by the International Co-ordinating Committee (ICC), after the formation of the International Paralympic Committee (IPC) in 1989.

Thomas' third and final Paralympics was at the Atlanta 1996 Paralympics, Thomas competed in the Men's Long jump F44 placing third and gaining a bronze medal. He also place third and received a bronze medal in the Men's 100m T43-44 final. Finally he competed in the Men's 4 × 100 m Relay T42-46 final where Thomas and his team placed first and received a gold medal as well as setting a world record. The gold medal 100 m relay team consisted of David Evans (athlete), Neil Fuller, Tim Matthews (athlete).The Atlanta Summer Paralympics were the first games to attract corporate sponsorship on a worldwide platform. It took place from 16 to 25 August 1996 and saw 3,808 Para Athletes, 2,643 men and 1,165 women from 104 countries competed at these Paralympics. There were 19 sports competed in, which saw 519 medal events, with 269 world records being broken. The Games saw 388,373 spectators attended various events throughout the competition, along with the Paralympic website receiving an average of 120,000 searches per day. These games aimed to focus on more than just the competition side of Olympics and Paralympics, with the third Paralympic Congress focusing on the theme of political and economic empowerment of people with an impairment as well as global issues within elite sport.

The events that he competed in while he was in his professional career were:

Paralympic Games	Event	Result
1988 Seoul Paralympics	Men's Long Jump A4A9 Final	5th, Jumping 4.95 meters
1988 Seoul Paralympics	Men's Javelin A4A9 final	6th, Throwing 38.08 meters
1988 Seoul Paralympics	Men's Pentathlon A4A9 final	2nd, Gaining 3286 points
1992 Barcelona Paralympics	Men's Pentathlon PS4 Final	7th, Gaining 1908 points
1992 Barcelona Paralympics	Men's 100m TS2 Heat	5th, Time of 14.01 seconds
1992 Barcelona Paralympics	Men's Long Jump J2 Final	8th, Jumping 4.66 meters
1996 Atlanta Paralympic Games	Men's 100m T43-44 Heat	2nd, Time of 12.20 seconds
1996 Atlanta Paralympic Games	Men's 100m T43-44 Final	3rd, Time of 12.02 seconds
1996 Atlanta Paralympic Games	Men's Long Jump F44 final	3rd, Jumping 5.74 meters
1996 Atlanta Paralympic Games	Men's 4 × 100 m T42-46 final	1st, Time of 45.40 seconds

Thomas finally competed in the IPC Athletics World Championships in 1998 in Birmingham, gaining a third-place result and bronze medal in the Men's Long jump F44.

Shortly after his efforts in Birmingham in 1998 he retired his athletic career and transitioned into his professional career outside of sport, which he had been working on before and during his time as a professional athlete.

== Personal life ==
During his time training for Seoul and Barcelona Thomas spent his time working in Tasmania for Medical Benefits Fund of Australia, which is now known as Bupa. After his time competing in two Paralympic Games and working at Bupa, Thomas made the move to Sydney to better his training and his career outside of sport. In 1993. Thomas was employed as a Branch manager at Manchester Unity, where he worked for 4 years between 1993 and 1997, continuing his Athletics career whilst working. During his time at Manchester Unity, he studied at TAFE NSW gaining his Certificate of Management from 1995 to 1996. Shortly after the 1996 Atlanta Games he made the transition to Telstra, in 1997, where he had roles including Senior Account Executive when he started and Director of Sales when he finished in 2002. Thomas moved between companies between 2002 and 2004, working as a Sales Manager at both AAPT Limited and IPass (company) before being employed by Microsoft between 2004 and 2008 where he had the roles of Partner Account Manager and Senior Business manager. During 2008–2010, Thomas worked at Lenovo as well as Novell in management positions before working for Canon Inc. Australia, where he was employed as General manager with varying roles within the company. Thomas also claims to be a professional speaker, in which he started doing in 1996. Drawing from his experiences throughout his professional careers in sport and business as well as his disability.

Thomas is currently working as a CEO of three companies which stem from being the CEO of Prophecy International Pty Ltd. The other two companies are eMite Pty Ltd and Snare Solutions. Both eMite and Snare Solutions are wholly owned subsidiaries of Prophecy International. He started first at eMite in 2016 and was introduced to both Snare Solutions and Prophecy International in 2017.

Prophecy International Holdings Limited is a software company that is listed on the Stock exchange as ASX:PRO. The company designs, develops and produces software across regions including America, Europe, Middle East, Africa and the Asia Pacific. Snare Solutions and eMite are the two wholly owned subsidiaries of Prophecy International, which develop differing technologies across the world. Snare solutions develops security and compliance software, more specifically, they develop advanced threat intelligence solutions which are used in defence, financial services, manufacturing, government agencies, transport and retail. eMite develops real time analytics and dashboard solutions which can be used in multiple technology environments. Although Prophecy International is an Adelaide-based company, Thomas currently resides in Sydney, Australia.

== Awards ==
Bradley has been recognised multiple times through his achievements in sport and as such he was awarded the Medal of the Order of Australia in 1997 as a tribute for his services to sport as well as being recognised as an Australia Day Ambassador in the same year. The Order of Australia recognises who have demonstrated outstanding service or exceptional achievement and anyone can be nominated to receive this medal. Further to this he was inducted into the Tasmanian Sporting Hall of Fame in 2006, which recognises and celebrates Tasmanian sporting heritage. This is awarded to people who have their state and nation with distinction and ensures that their achievements in sport receive recognition.
