= Ivory Coast at the 2012 Summer Paralympics =

- Flag of Ivory Coast
- IPC code: CIV
- NPC: Fédération Ivoirienne des Sports Paralympiques

in London
- Competitors: 4 in 2 sports
- Flag bearer: Carine Tchei
- Medals: Gold 0 Silver 0 Bronze 0 Total 0

Summer Paralympics appearances (overview)
- 1996; 2000; 2004; 2008; 2012; 2016; 2020; 2024

Ivory Coast competed at the 2012 Summer Paralympics in London, United Kingdom from August 29 to September 9, 2012.

== Athletics ==
Men's track

Athlete	Event	Heat		Final	
Athlete	Event	Result	Rank	Result	Rank
Addoh Kimou	200m T46	23.70	8	did not advance	
Addoh Kimou	400m T46	50.17	3 Q	DSQ	
Kouame Noumbo	100m T46	DNS		did not advance	
Kouame Noumbo	200m T46	DNF		did not advance	

== Powerlifting ==
Athlete	Event	Result	Rank
Alidou Diamoutene	Men's -52kg	160	5
Carine Tchei	Women's -67.5kg	NMR	

== See also ==
- Ivory Coast at the Paralympics
- Ivory Coast at the 2012 Summer Olympics
