= 1996 Summer Paralympics medal table =

1996 Summer Paralympics medals
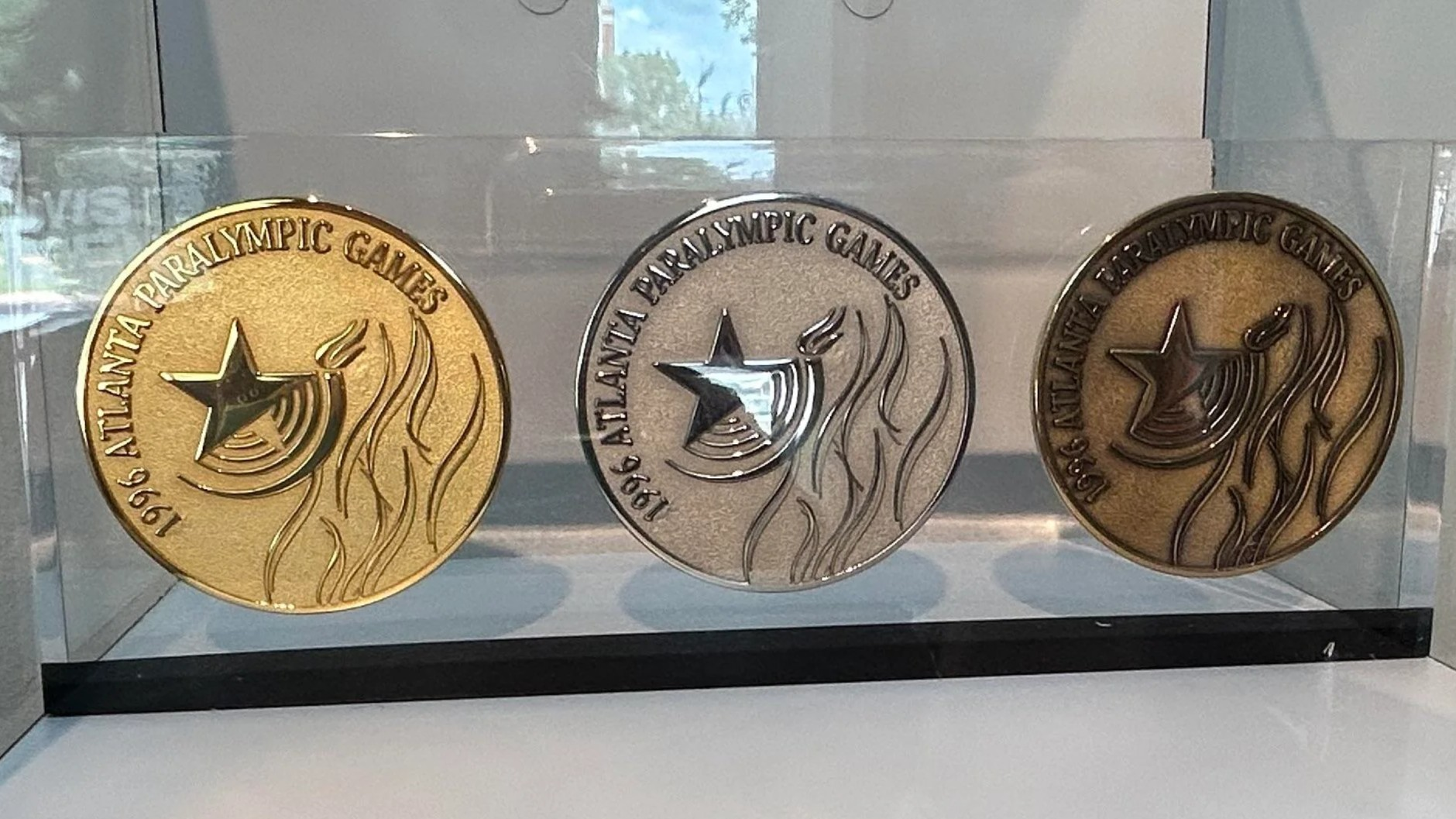
- Location: Atlanta, United States

Highlights
- Most gold medals: United States (46)
- Most total medals: United States (157)
- Medalling NPCs: 60

The 1996 Summer Paralympics medal table is a list of National Paralympic Committees (NPCs) ranked by the number of gold medals won by their athletes during the 1996 Summer Paralympics, held in Atlanta, Georgia, United States, from August 16 to August 25, 1996.

== Medal table ==
The ranking in this table is based on information provided by the International Paralympic Committee (IPC) and is consistent with IPC convention in its published medal tables. By default, the table is ordered by the number of gold medals the athletes from a nation have won (in this context, a "nation" is an entity represented by a National Paralympic Committee). The number of silver medals is next considered, followed by the number of bronze medals. If nations remain tied, they are ranked equally and listed alphabetically by IPC country code.

To sort this table by nation, total medal count, or any other column, click on the icon next to the column title.

* Host nation (United States)

1996 Summer Paralympics medal table
Rank	Nation	Gold	Silver	Bronze	Total
1	United States (USA)*	47	46	67	160
2	Australia (AUS)	42	37	27	106
3	Germany (GER)	40	58	51	149
4	Great Britain (GBR)	40	42	41	123
5	Spain (ESP)	39	31	36	106
6	France (FRA)	35	30	31	96
7	Canada (CAN)	24	23	24	71
8	Netherlands (NED)	17	11	17	45
9	China (CHN)	16	13	10	39
10	Japan (JPN)	14	10	13	37
11	Poland (POL)	13	14	8	35
12	South Korea (KOR)	13	2	15	30
13	Sweden (SWE)	12	14	11	37
14	Italy (ITA)	11	20	14	45
15	South Africa (RSA)	10	8	10	28
16	Russia (RUS)	9	7	11	27
17	Norway (NOR)	9	7	4	20
18	Switzerland (SUI)	9	6	6	21
19	New Zealand (NZL)	9	6	4	19
20	Iran (IRI)	9	5	3	17
21	Egypt (EGY)	8	11	11	30
22	Belgium (BEL)	8	10	7	25
23	Cuba (CUB)	8	3	0	11
24	Denmark (DEN)	7	17	17	41
25	Austria (AUT)	6	6	10	22
26	Portugal (POR)	6	4	4	14
27	Hong Kong (HKG)	5	5	5	15
28	Iceland (ISL)	5	4	5	14
29	Hungary (HUN)	5	2	3	10
30	Finland (FIN)	4	5	4	13
31	Mexico (MEX)	3	5	4	12
32	Estonia (EST)	3	4	2	9
33	Belarus (BLR)	3	3	7	13
34	Lithuania (LTU)	3	2	6	11
35	Nigeria (NGR)	3	2	3	8
36	Czech Republic (CZE)	2	7	1	10
37	Brazil (BRA)	2	6	13	21
38	Argentina (ARG)	2	5	2	9
39	Slovakia (SVK)	2	4	5	11
40	Algeria (ALG)	2	2	3	7
41	Yugoslavia (YUG)	2	2	0	4
42	Ivory Coast (CIV)	2	0	0	2
42	Panama (PAN)	2	0	0	2
44	Ukraine (UKR)	1	4	2	7
45	Ireland (IRL)	1	3	6	10
46	Greece (GRE)	1	1	3	5
47	Kuwait (KUW)	1	1	1	3
48	Kenya (KEN)	1	1	0	2
49	Chinese Taipei (TPE)	1	0	2	3
50	Dominican Republic (DOM)	1	0	0	1
50	Peru (PER)	1	0	0	1
52	Israel (ISR)	0	4	5	9
53	Slovenia (SLO)	0	2	3	5
54	Tunisia (TUN)	0	2	0	2
55	Bulgaria (BUL)	0	1	1	2
56	Jordan (JOR)	0	1	0	1
57	Moldova (MDA)	0	0	2	2
57	Thailand (THA)	0	0	2	2
59	Jamaica (JAM)	0	0	1	1
59	Uruguay (URU)	0	0	1	1
Totals (60 entries)		519	519	544	1,582

== See also ==
- 1996 Summer Olympics medal table
