= Nieves Álvarez Costa =

Spanish Paralympic athlete

Personal information
- Full name: María Nieves Álvarez Costa
- Born: 2 July 1962 (age 64) Barcelona, Spain

Sport
- Country: Spain
- Sport: Para athletics
- Disability class: T36
- Events: 100 m, 200 m, 400 m
Medal record
Women's para athletics
Representing Spain
Paralympic Games
Silver medal – second place	1996 Atlanta	100 m T34-35
World Championships
Gold medal – first place	1994 Berlin	Club throw T36
Silver medal – second place	1994 Berlin	100 m T36
Silver medal – second place	1994 Berlin	200 m T36
Bronze medal – third place	1998 Birmingham	200 m T36
European Championships
Silver medal – second place	1999	200 m T36
Bronze medal – third place	1999	100 m T36

María Nieves Álvarez Costa (Note: In this Spanish name, the first or paternal surname is Álvarez and the second or maternal family name is Costa.) (born 2 July 1962), known as Nieves Álvarez Costa (Catalan: Neus Álvarez Costa), is a paralympic athlete from Spain competing mainly in 100 m and 200 m events in the T36 class.

Álvarez competed as part of the Spanish team at the 1992 Summer Paralympics in Barcelona, where she finished 6th in the women's 100 m C5-6.

She earned a silver medal in the women's 100 m T34-35 event at the 1996 Summer Paralympics in Atlanta, finishing behind Caroline Innes of Great Britain. Álvarez also competed in the women's 200 m T34-37 event, where she was disqualified in the heat.

At the 1998 IPC Athletics World Championships in Birmingham, she earned a bronze medal in the 200 m T36 event and finished 4th in the 100 m T36 event.

At the 2000 Summer Paralympics in Sydney, she finished 4th in the 200 m T36, 5th in the 400 m T36, and 6th in the 100 m T36 events.
