= Belarus at the 1996 Summer Paralympics =

- IPC code: BLR
- NPC: Paralympic Committee of the Republic of Belarus

in Atlanta
- Competitors: 15 (11 men and 4 women)
- Medals Ranked 33rd: Gold 3 Silver 3 Bronze 7 Total 13

Summer Paralympics appearances (overview)
- 1996; 2000; 2004; 2008; 2012; 2016; 2020; 2024

Other related appearances
- Soviet Union (1988); Unified Team (1992)

Fifteen athletes (eleven men and four women) from Belarus competed at the 1996 Summer Paralympics in Atlanta, United States. All their medals were won in athletics.

== Medallists ==
Medal	Name	Sport	Event
Gold	Oleg Chepel	Athletics	Men's high jump F10-11
Gold	Iryna Leantsiuk	Athletics	Women's long jump F42-46
Gold	Tamara Sivakova	Athletics	Women's shot put F12
Silver	Ihar Fartunau	Athletics	Men's long jump F12
Silver	Ihar Fartunau	Athletics	Men's triple jump F12
Silver	N. Denissevitch	Athletics	Men's shot put F10
Bronze	Victor Joukovski	Athletics	Men's triple jump F10
Bronze	N. Denissevitch	Athletics	Men's discus F10
Bronze	Victor Joukovski	Athletics	Men's pentathlon P10
Bronze	Ihar Fartunau	Athletics	Men's pentathlon P12
Bronze	Iryna Leantsiuk	Athletics	Women's 200m T42-46
Bronze	Tamara Sivakova	Athletics	Women's discus F12
Bronze	Yadviha Skorabahataya	Athletics	Women's javelin F10-11

== See also ==
- Belarus at the Paralympics
- Belarus at the 1996 Summer Olympics
