= Lutovico Halagahu =

French Paralympic athlete

Personal information
- Born: 21 July 1967

Sport
- Country: France
- Sport: para athletics
Medal record
Men's para athletics
Representing France
Paralympic Games
Gold medal – first place	1996 Atlanta	Shot put - F43-44
Gold medal – first place	2000 Sydney	Shot put - F44
Silver medal – second place	1996 Atlanta	Javelin throw - F43-44
Bronze medal – third place	2000 Sydney	Discus throw - F44
Representing Wallis and Futuna
Pacific Games
Gold medal – first place	2015 Port Moresby	Javelin ambulant

Lutovico Halagahu (born 21 July 1967) is a paralympic athlete from France competing mainly in category F44 throwing events.

Lutovico has competed in two Paralympics, his first in 1996 he competed in the discus throw, won a silver in the javelin throw and a gold medal in the shot put. Four years later in the 2000 Summer Paralympics he defended his shot put gold medal and won a bronze in the discus throw.

At the 2015 Pacific Games in Port Moresby he won bronze in the javelin throw.

In September 1996 he was appointed a Chevalier of the Legion of Honour for his paralympic sporting activities. In November 2000 he was made an Officer of the Ordre national du Mérite.
