= Cristeen Smith =

New Zealand Paralympic athlete

Personal information
- Born: 5 November 1956 (age 69)
Medal record
Women's para athletics
Representing New Zealand
Paralympic Games
Gold medal – first place	1992 Barcelona	100 metres - T52
Gold medal – first place	1996 Atlanta	200 metres - T52
Silver medal – second place	1996 Atlanta	800 metres - T52

Cristeen Smith (born 5 November 1956) is a paralympic athlete from New Zealand competing mainly in category T52 track events and F53 Field events.

Cristeen is a three time Paralympic medalist, having competed at two paralympics. Her first games came in Barcelona in 1992 Summer Paralympics where she competed in the 100m, 200m, 400m and 800m winning the 100m in the T52 class and setting a new World Record. The following games in 1996 saw her compete in the 200m, 400m and 800m winning gold in the 200m setting a new Paralympic Record and silver in the 800m

Cristeen remains the current F53 world record holder in 2 F53 field events

F53 -Shot put - 5.88 - 28 July 1994 at IPC World Championships Berlin, Germany

F53 -Pentathlon - 5167 - 5 Aug 1993 at Stoke Mandeville Games Great Britain

previously held world records in F53 Javelin (before changes to javelin weight and length)

F53 -Discus - 14.46 - 26 July 1995 at Stoke Mandeville Games Great Britain

T52 - 100mts track sprint

T52 - 200mts track sprint

In 2000 Cristeen was named Auckland Parafed New Zealand - Athlete of the Century
