= Jennifer Barrett =

American Paralympic athlete

Sport
- Country: United States
- Sport: Paralympic athletics
- Disability class: F46
- Events: Discus throw Shot put
Medal record
Paralympic athletics
Representing United States
Paralympic Games
Gold medal – first place	1996 Atlanta	Women's discus throw F42-44/46
Silver medal – second place	2000 Sydney	Women's discus throw F46
Bronze medal – third place	1996 Atlanta	Women's shot put F42-44/46
Bronze medal – third place	2000 Sydney	Women's shot put F46
World Championships
Gold medal – first place	1998 Birmingham	Discus throw F44/46
Gold medal – first place	1998 Birmingham	Shot put F46

Jennifer Barrett is an American Paralympic athlete who competed at the 1996 Summer Paralympics and 2000 Summer Paralympics for Team USA in discus throw and shot put winning four Paralympic medals and is also a double World champion.

== Career ==
Barrett competed in the 1996 Summer Paralympics and 2000 Summer Paralympics for Team USA. During her first Paralympic Games, she earned a bronze medal in Women's Shot Put F42-44/46 and a gold medal in Women's Discus Throw F42-44/46. In the 2000 Paralympics, Barrett earned a silver medal in Women's Discus Throw F46 and a bronze medal in Women's Shot Put F46. She also holds the world record in discus and the United States national record for shot put.
