= Marcin Awiżeń =

Polish Paralympic athlete

Medal record

Paralympic athletics

Representing Poland

Paralympic Games
Gold medal – first place	2008 Beijing	800m - T46

Marcin Awiżeń (born 1 November 1985) is a Paralympian athlete from Poland competing mainly in category T46 middle-distance events.

He competed in the 2008 Summer Paralympics in Beijing, China. There he won a gold medal in the men's 800 metres - T46 event and finished fourth in the men's 1500 metres - T46 event.
