= Ivory Coast at the 2020 Summer Paralympics =

- Flag of Ivory Coast
- IPC code: CIV

in Tokyo, Japan August 24, 2021 – September 5, 2021
- Competitors: 3 (2 men and 1 woman) in 2 sports and 4 events
- Flag bearers: Adou Herve Ano; Sebehe Clarisse Lago
- Medals: Gold 0 Silver 0 Bronze 0 Total 0

Summer Paralympics appearances (overview)
- 1996; 2000; 2004; 2008; 2012; 2016; 2020; 2024

Ivory Coast will be participating at the 2020 Summer Paralympics in Tokyo, Japan, from 24 August to 5 September 2021. This will be their seventh consecutive appearance at the Summer Paralympics since 1996.

== Competitors ==
The following is the list of number of competitors participating in the Games:

Sport	Men	Women	Total
Athletics	1	1	2
Powerlifting	1	0	1
Total	2	1	3

== Athletics ==
Men's field

Athlete	Event	Final	
Athlete	Event	Result	Rank
Kah Michel Ye	Javelin throw F41	34.41	8
Kah Michel Ye	Shot put F41	10.15	7

Women's track

Athlete	Event	Final	
Athlete	Event	Result	Rank
Sebehe Clarisse Lago	Shot put F40	DNS	None

== Powerlifting ==
Athlete	Event	Body weight (kg)	Attempts (kg)				Result (kg)	Place
Athlete	Event	Body weight (kg)	1	2	3	4	Result (kg)	Place
Adou Herve Ano	Men's –65 kg	63.79	~~150~~	~~150~~	160	–	160	5

== See also ==
- Ivory Coast at the Paralympics
- Ivory Coast at the 2020 Summer Olympics
