= Ivory Coast at the 2016 Summer Paralympics =

- Flag of Ivory Coast
- IPC code: CIV
- NPC: Fédération Ivoirienne des Sports Paralympiques

in Rio de Janeiro
- Competitors: 5 in 2 sports
- Flag bearer: Alidou Diamoutene
- Medals Ranked 69th: Gold 0 Silver 1 Bronze 0 Total 1

Summer Paralympics appearances (overview)
- 1996; 2000; 2004; 2008; 2012; 2016; 2020; 2024

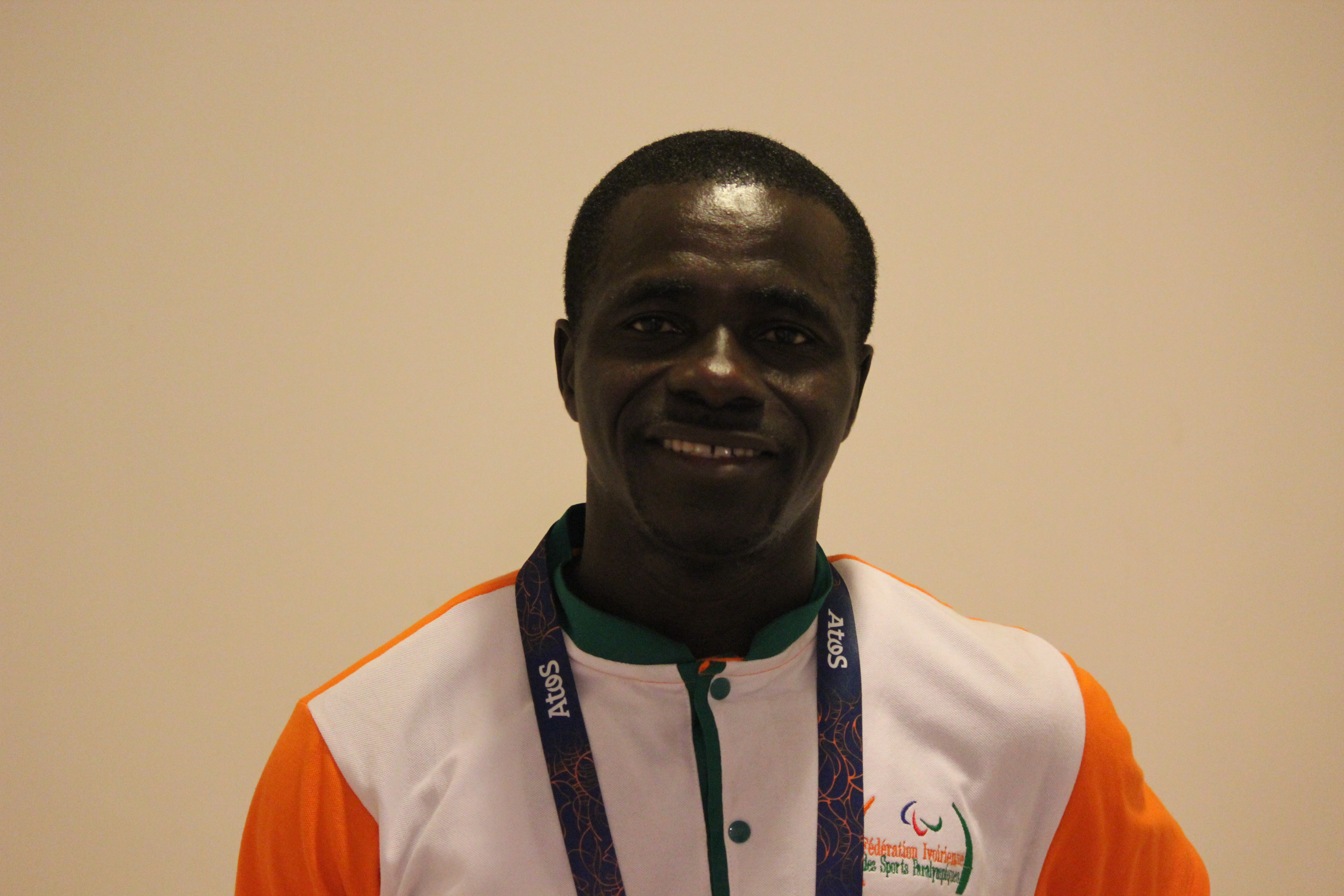
Chef-de-mission of the Ivory Coast, Koya Magbu, in Rio.

Ivory Coast competed at the 2016 Summer Paralympics in Rio de Janeiro, Brazil, from 7 September to 18 September 2016.

== Disability classifications ==
Every participant at the Paralympics has their disability grouped into one of five disability categories; amputation, the condition may be congenital or sustained through injury or illness; cerebral palsy; wheelchair athletes, there is often overlap between this and other categories; visual impairment, including blindness; Les autres, any physical disability that does not fall strictly under one of the other categories, for example dwarfism or multiple sclerosis. Each Paralympic sport then has its own classifications, dependent upon the specific physical demands of competition. Events are given a code, made of numbers and letters, describing the type of event and classification of the athletes competing. Some sports, such as athletics, divide athletes by both the category and severity of their disabilities, other sports, for example swimming, group competitors from different categories together, the only separation being based on the severity of the disability.

== Delegation ==
The country was represented by 5 Paralympians, 3 men and 2 women, competing in two sport, athletics and powerlifting. Both competed in athletics.

== Medallists ==
The Ivory Coast finished eighth overall among African countries on the gold medal table, with 1 silver medal.

Medal	Name	Sport	Event	Date
Silver	Fatimata Diasso	Athletics	Women's Long Jump F11	16 September

== Athletics ==
Men's Track

Athlete	Events	Heat		Final	
Athlete	Events	Time	Rank	Time	Rank
Kouame Noumbo	400 m T45-47	50.14	2 Q	Disqualified	

Men's Field

Athlete	Events	Result	Rank
Benian Duffi	Shot Put F40	8.80	6
Benian Duffi	Javelin F40-41	30.31	10

Women's Track

Athlete	Events	Heat		Semifinal		Final	
Athlete	Events	Time	Rank	Time	Rank	Time	Rank
Fatimata Diasso (Guide – N’Guessan Gohore Bi)	100 m T11	13.10	3	did not advance			
Fatimata Diasso (Guide – N’Guessan Gohore Bi)	200 m T11	Disqualified		did not advance			

Women's Field

Athlete	Events	Result	Rank
Fatimata Diasso	Long Jump F11	4.89	2nd place, silver medalist(s)
Sebehe Lago	Shot Put F40	5.25	8

== Powerlifting ==
38-year-old Alidou Diamoutene represented the Ivory Coast at the Paralympics. He previously competed at the 2004, 2008 and 2012 Paralympics. His best finish was fifth. Diamoutene also competed at the 2006, 2010 and 2014 IPC Powerlifting World Championships, with a best finish of fifth in the -48 kg class in 2006. Nicknamed The Tiger, he is coached by Roger Angoua and Emile N'goran.

Athlete	Event	Result	Rank
Alidou Diamoutene	Men's −54 kg	No Mark	

== See also ==
- Ivory Coast at the 2016 Summer Olympics
