= Ivory Coast at the 2024 Summer Paralympics =

2024 sporting event delegation in Paris

- Flag of Ivory Coast
- IPC code: CIV
- NPC: Fédération Ivoirienne des Sports Paralympiques
- Website: comiteparalympique-civ.org

in Paris, France August 28, 2024 – September 8, 2024
- Competitors: 3 (3 men) in 3 sports
- Flag bearer: Ano Adou Hervé
- Medals: Gold 0 Silver 0 Bronze 0 Total 0

Summer Paralympics appearances (overview)
- 1996; 2000; 2004; 2008; 2012; 2016; 2020; 2024

Ivory Coast competed at the 2024 Summer Paralympics in Paris, France, from 28 August to 8 September 2024.

== Competitors ==
The following is the list of number of competitors in the Games, including game-eligible alternates in team sports.

Sport	Men	Women	Total
Athletics	1	0	1
Powerlifting	1	0	1
Taekwondo	1	0	1
Total	3	0	3

== Athletics ==
Key

- Note–Ranks given for track events are within the athlete's heat only
- Q = Qualified for the next round
- q = Qualified for the next round as a fastest loser or, in field events, by position without achieving the qualifying target
- DQ = Disqualified
- PR = Paralympic Record
- AR = Area (or continental) Record
- NR = National Record
- SB = Season's Best
- N/A = Round not applicable for the event
- Bye = Athlete not required to compete in round

Field events

Athlete	Event	Final	
Athlete	Event	Result	Rank
Ye Kah Michel	Men's shot put F41	10.46	6
Ye Kah Michel	Men's javelin throw F41	37.69	4

== Powerlifting ==
Athlete	Event	Attempts (kg)				Result (kg)	Rank
Athlete	Event	1	2	3	4	Result (kg)	Rank
Adou Hervé Ano	Men's –80 kg	186	~~190~~	191	—	191	7

== Taekwondo ==
Athlete	Event	Round of 16	Quarterfinals	Repechage 1	Repechage 2	Semifinals	Final / BM	
Athlete	Event	Opposition Result	Opposition Result	Opposition Result	Opposition Result	Opposition Result	Opposition Result	Rank
Bi Assamoa Boli	Men's −70 kg	Suárez (CUB); L 17-18	Did not advance					

== See also ==
- Ivory Coast at the 2024 Summer Olympics
- Ivory Coast at the Paralympics
