= Raquel Díaz Caro =

Spanish athlete (born 1974)

Personal information
- Born: 13 May 1974 (age 52) Barcelona, Spain

Sport
- Country: Spain
- Sport: Paralympic athletics
- Disability: Disability
- Disability class: T11
Medal record
Paralympic athletics
Representing Spain
Paralympic Games
Bronze medal – third place	1996 Atlanta	100m T10
World Championships
Gold medal – first place	1994 Berlin	4x100m relay T11-13
Silver medal – second place	1994 Berlin	100m T11
Silver medal – second place	1994 Berlin	4x400m relay T11-13

Raquel Diaz Caro (born May 13, 1974, in Barcelona) is a track and field athlete from Spain. She has a disability: She is blind and a T11/B1 type athlete. She competed at the 1996 Summer Paralympics, winning a bronze medal in the 100 meter T11 race and finishing fourth in 200 meter T11 race. She also competed at the 2000 Summer Paralympics.
