= Evelyne Khatsembula =

Kenyan Paralympic sprinter

Personal information
- Nationality: Kenyan

Sport
- Country: Kenya
- Sport: Paralympic athletics
- Disability class: T37
Medal record
Representing Kenya
Women's Paralympic athletics
Summer Paralympics
Bronze medal – third place	Sydney 2000	100m T37

Evelyne Khatsembula is a Kenyan paralympic track and field athlete. She represented Kenya at the 2000 Summer Paralympics and clinched a bronze medal in the women's 100m event under T37 classification.
