= LeAnn Shannon =

American wheelchair racer (born 1982)

Personal information
- Born: 1982 (age 43–44) Orange Park, Florida, U.S.

Sport
- Country: United States
- Sport: Paralympic athletics
- Disability: Spinal cord injury
- Disability class: T52
- Club: Florida Striders
Medal record
Paralympic athletics
Representing United States
Paralympic Games
Gold medal – first place	1996 Atlanta	100m T52
Gold medal – first place	1996 Atlanta	200m T52
Gold medal – first place	1996 Atlanta	400m T52
Silver medal – second place	1996 Atlanta	800m T52

LeAnn Shannon (born 1982) is a former American Paralympic athlete who competed in wheelchair racing events at international track and field competitions. She was the youngest Paralympic champion from the United States at the 1996 Summer Paralympics where she won three golds and one silver at the age of fourteen including breaking two world records, she had also competed at 1996 Summer Olympics in the 800m wheelchair demonstration event. She was paralysed in a car accident when she was less than one year old.

Shannon attended Herbert Wertheim College of Medicine at Florida International University, she is studying radiology at Vanderbilt Medical Center in Nashville, Tennessee. She was the first person in her family to graduate with a Doctor of Medicine degree.

== Sporting career ==
Shannon's parents, Ann and Lee Shannon, took her to a wheelchair sports meet in Orlando, Florida when she was five years old in a makeshift racing chair. LeAnn took part in swimming and softball yet she found her favourite event which was wheelchair racing using a three-wheel chair which, at the time, wasn't sanctioned for racing. Shannon got even more inspired when she watch a wheelchair exhibition race at the 1992 Summer Olympics which soon became her huge turning point where she took wheelchair racing seriously.
