= Arthur Lewis (parathlete) =

American Paralympic athlete (born 1972)

Medal record

Track and field (T12)

Representing United States

Paralympic Games
Bronze medal – third place	1996 Atlanta	Men's 200m T13
Bronze medal – third place	1996 Atlanta	Men's 4x100 m Relay T11-13

Arthur Alexander Lewis III (born June 5, 1972, in Hollywood, California) is a Paralympian athlete from the United States competing mainly in category T12 and T13 100m, 200m, long jump, triple jump, 4 × 100 m relay and 4 × 400 m relay.
