= Kuwait at the 1996 Summer Paralympics =

- IPC code: KUW
- NPC: Kuwait Paralympic Committee

in Atlanta
- Competitors: 17
- Medals Ranked 47th: Gold 1 Silver 1 Bronze 1 Total 3

Summer Paralympics appearances (overview)
- 1980; 1984; 1988; 1992; 1996; 2000; 2004; 2008; 2012; 2016; 2020; 2024

Seventeen male athletes from Kuwait competed at the 1996 Summer Paralympics in Atlanta, United States.

== Medallists ==
Medal	Name	Sport	Event
Gold	Fahed Al-Mutairi	Athletics	Men's javelin F35
Silver	Aly Mohamed	Athletics	Men's javelin F57
Bronze	Mashal Al-Otaibi	Athletics	Men's javelin F55

== See also ==
- Kuwait at the Paralympics
- Kuwait at the 1996 Summer Olympics
