= Josias Lima =

Brazilian Paralympic athlete

Sport
- Sport: Para athletics
- Disability class: F52, F55
- Event(s): Shot put, Discus throw
Medal record
Men's para athletics
Representing Brazil
Paralympic Games
Silver medal – second place	1996 Atlanta	Shot put - F52

Josias Lima is a paralympic athlete from Brazil competing mainly in category F52 throwing events.

Josias was part of the Brazilian team that attended the 1996 Summer Paralympics in Atlanta. There he competed in all three throws finishing ninth in the F55 Discus, sixth in the F55 javelin and won the silver medal in the F52 shot put that was won by New Zealand's Peter Martin in a new world record distance.
