= José Luis Tovar =

Spanish Paralympic athlete

Medal record

Paralympic athletics

Representing Spain

Paralympic Games
| Silver medal – second place | 1996 Atlanta | 400 metres - T10 |

Jose Luis Tovar is a paralympic athlete from Spain competing mainly in category T11 track events.

Jose Luis has competed at three paralympics starting with the 800m and 1500m at the 1992 Summer Paralympics where he failed to make the final. In the 1996 Summer Paralympics won the silver medal in the 400m, and finished fourth in the 800m. At his final games in 2000 he finished fourth in the 400m and failed to finished in the 1500m.
