= Manfred Kooy =

Dutch Paralympic athlete (born 1970)

Medal record

Track and field (athletics)

Representing Netherlands

Paralympic Games
Bronze medal – third place	1996 Atlanta	800 metres - T37

Manfred Kooy (born 6 July 1970) is a Paralympian athlete from the Netherlands competing mainly in category T38 middle-distance events.

Kooy has competed in three Paralympics, firstly in Barcelona in 1992 where he competed in the 100m, 200m, 400m and 800m in the C8 class without any medal success. In 1996 he moved to competing in the 800m and 1500m winning the bronze medal in the T37 800m. By 2000 having moved to T38 class he missed out on a medal in his only event, the T38 800m.
