= Craig Groenewald =

South African Paralympic swimmer

Medal record

Swimming

Representing South Africa

Paralympic Games
Bronze medal – third place	1996 Atlanta	50 metre freestyle - MH
Bronze medal – third place	1996 Atlanta	100 metre freestyle - MH
Bronze medal – third place	2000 Sydney	50 metre freestyle - S14
Bronze medal – third place	2000 Sydney	200 metre freestyle - S14

Craig Groenewald (born 20 March 1979 in Johannesburg) is a paralympic swimmer from South Africa competing mainly in category S14 events.

Craig competed in his first Paralympic games in 1996 where he won bronze in both the 50m freestyle and 100m freestyle. Four years later in the 2000 Summer Paralympics he again won two bronze medals, this time in the 50m freestyle and 200m freestyle, he also finished fourth in the 100m freestyle, fifth in the 50m butterfly and missed out on qualifying for the final of the 100m breaststroke and 200m medley.
