= Joerg Trippen-Hilgers =

German Paralympic athlete

Medal record

Paralympic athletics

Representing Germany

Paralympic Games
Silver medal – second place	1996 Atlanta	4x100 metre relay - T10-12
Bronze medal – third place	2000 Sydney	Long Jump - F12

Joerg Trippen-Hilgers is a paralympic athlete from Germany competing mainly in category F12 long jump and pentathlon events.

Joerg competed in both the long jump and pentathlon at both the 1996 Summer Paralympics and 2000 Summer Paralympics winning a bronze medal in the 2000 long jump. At the 1996 games he also competed in the triple jump and 4 × 100 m relay, winning a silver medal with his fellow German athletes in the relay.
