= Douglas Collier =

American Paralympic athlete

Medal record

Track and field (P44)

Representing United States

Paralympic Games
Bronze medal – third place	1996 Atlanta	Men's Pentathlon P44
Bronze medal – third place	1996 Atlanta	Men's 4x100 m Relay T42-46

Douglas Collier is a Paralympic athlete from United States competing mainly in category P44 pentathlon events.

He competed in the 1996 Summer Paralympics in Atlanta, United States. There he won a bronze medal in the men's Pentathlon - P44 event, a bronze medal in the men's 4 x 100 metre relay - T42-46 event, and finished eleventh in the men's Discus throw - F43-44 event.
