= David Evans (athlete) =

Australian Paralympic athlete

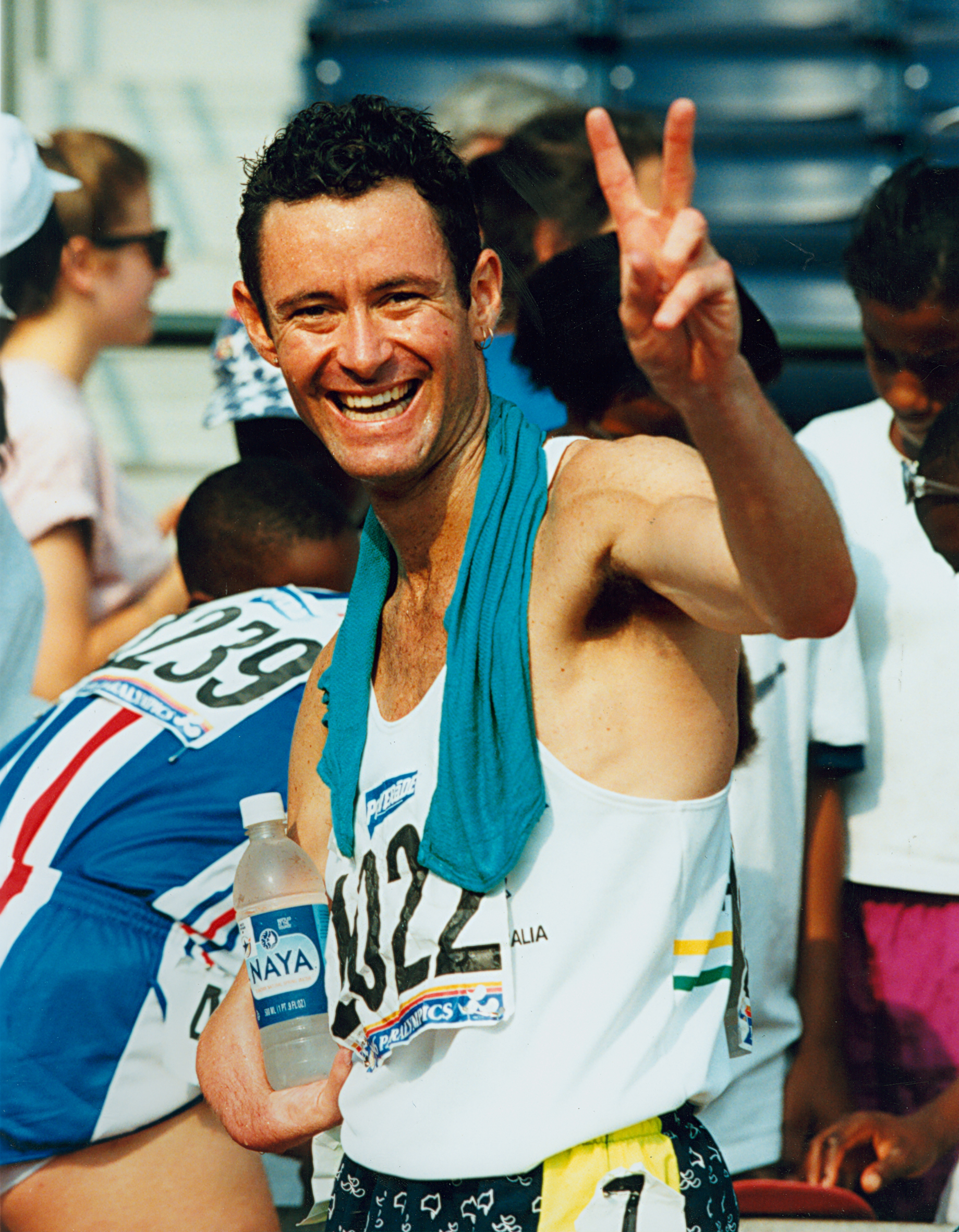
- Evans at the 1996 Atlanta Paralympics

Personal information
- Full name: David Martin Evans
- Nickname: Clock
- Nationality: Australia
Medal record
Men's para athletics
Representing Australia
Paralympic Games
Gold medal – first place	1996 Atlanta	1500 m T44-46
Gold medal – first place	1996 Atlanta	4x100 m T42-46
Silver medal – second place	1996 Atlanta	800 m T44-46
World Championships
Gold medal – first place	1994 Berlin	800 m T46
Gold medal – first place	1994 Berlin	1500 m T46
Gold medal – first place	1994 Berlin	4x100 m T42-46
Bronze medal – third place	1994 Berlin	5000 m T46

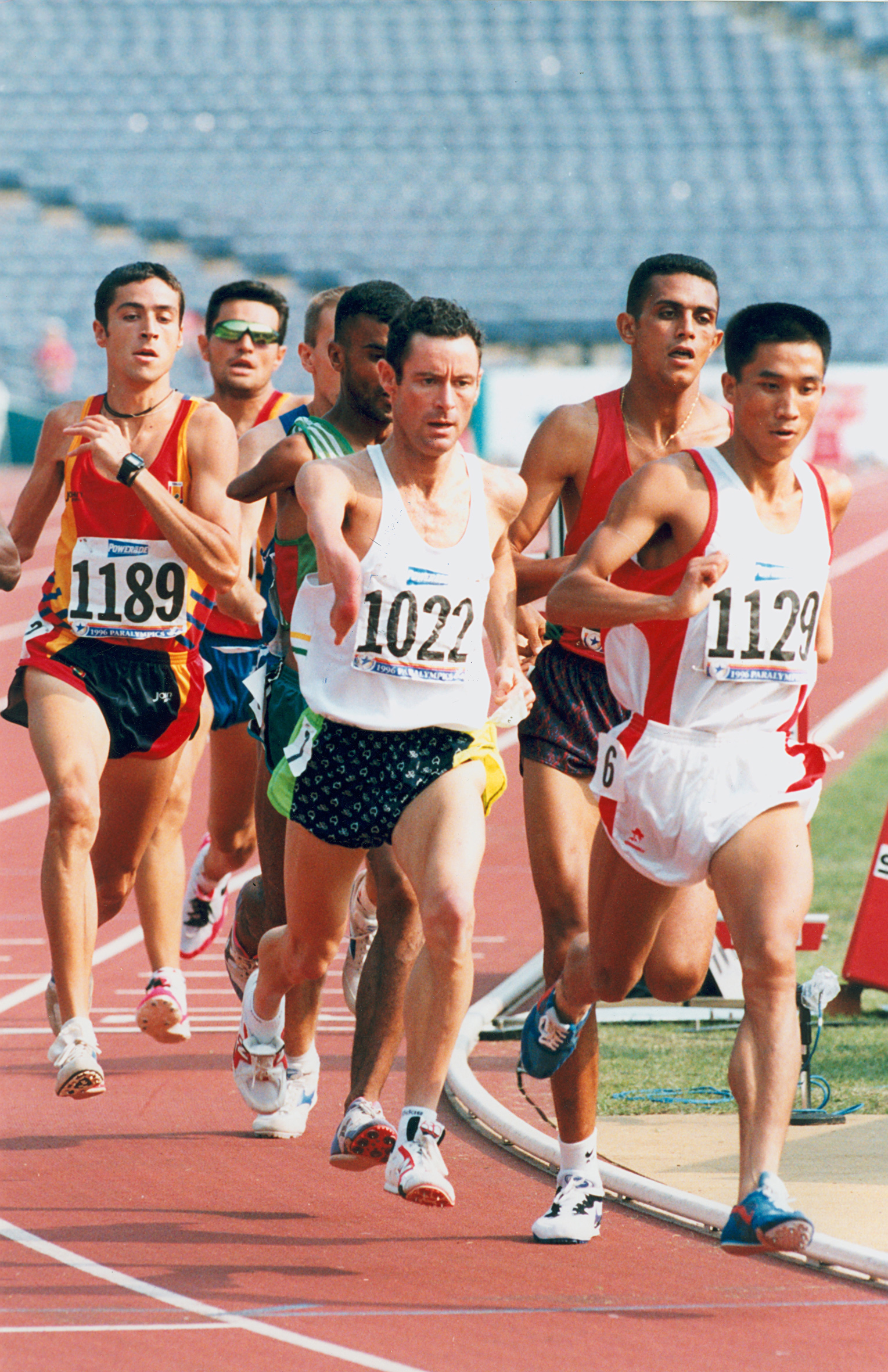
David Evans Evans on his way to a gold medal in the T46 1500m event at the 1996 Atlanta Paralympic Games. Chinese athlete Yanjian Wu (right) won the silver medal

David Martin Evans, OAM (born 20 September 1967) is an Australian Paralympic athlete. He is an arm amputee, and his nickname was 'Clock'.

== Career ==
Evans competed in the 1500m and 5000m at the 1984 New York/Stoke Mandeville Paralympics. In 1991, the Australian Institute of Sport established an Athletics with a Disability Program and he became an inaugural scholarship holder and was coached by Chris Nunn. At the 1992 Barcelona Paralympics, Evans competed in four events – 400m, 800m, 1500m and 5000m.

Evans won three gold medals 800m, 1500m and 4 × 100 m T42-46 and a bronze medal in the 5000m at the 1st IPC Athletics World Championships in Berlin, Germany in 1994.

At the 1996 Atlanta Paralympics, he won two gold medals in the Men's 4 × 100 m Relay T42-46 event and the Men's 1,500 m T44-46 event, for which he received a Medal of the Order of Australia, and a silver medal in the Men's 800 m T44-46 event. He also competed in the 800m and 5000m.

In an interview, Evans commented "I spent too many years not training seriously because it was too easy to win in disabled events without doing any work. It was only when I came to the AIS and started using able bodied athletes as a yardstick that I really improved."

As of 2017, Evans is ranked the fifth in the leading male gold medallists tally for Australian Para-athletes at the IPC World Athletics Championships.

in 2012, Evans had a place on the board of management at 'Limbs 4 Life' as the secretary of the organisation. The mission of this organisation is to provide information and support to amputees and their families.
