= Thomas Bourgeois =

American Paralympic athlete

Medal record

Track and field (P44)

Representing United States

Paralympic Games
Silver medal – second place	1996 Atlanta	Men's Pentathlon P44
Silver medal – second place	2000 Sydney	Men's Pentathlon P44
Bronze medal – third place	1992 Barcelona	Men's Pentathlon PS4
Bronze medal – third place	1996 Atlanta	Men's 4x100 m Relay T42-46

Thomas Bourgeois is a Paralympic athlete from America competing mainly in category P44 pentathlon events.

He won a bronze medal at the 1992 Summer Paralympics in Barcelona, Spain in the men's Pentathlon - PS4 event. At the 1996 Summer Paralympics in Atlanta, United States, he won a silver medal in the men's Pentathlon - P44 event, a bronze medal in the men's 4 x 100 meter relay - T42-46 event, and finished seventh in the men's 800 meters - F43-44 event. At the 2000 Summer Paralympics in Sydney, Australia, he won a silver medal in the men's Pentathlon - P44 event.
