= Jeferey Muralt =

New Zealand Paralympic athlete

Medal record

Men's para athletics

Representing New Zealand

Paralympic Games
Bronze medal – third place	1996 Atlanta	400 metres - T53

Jeferey "Jeff" Muralt is a paralympic athlete from New Zealand competing mainly in category T53 track events.

Muralt competed in the 1996 Summer Paralympics in Atlanta in the 400m, 800m, 1500m and 5000m. His only medal was in the 400m where he finished third.
