= Andreas Müller (athlete) =

German Paralympic athlete

Medal record

Paralympic athletics

Representing Germany

Paralympic Games
Gold medal – first place	1992 Barcelona	Discus Throw - F32-33
Silver medal – second place	1996 Atlanta	Javelin Throw - F32-33
Silver medal – second place	2000 Sydney	Shot Put - F34

Andreas Müller (Erfurt, 22 February 1971) is a paralympic athlete from Germany competing mainly in category F34 throws events.

Müller competed in all three throws in the class C5 at the 1992 Summer Paralympics in Barcelona but did not manage to win any medals. In 1996 Summer Paralympics he won the F32-33 discus and won the silver in F32-33 shot put. In 2000 he won a second silver in the F34 discus.
