= Hou Bin =

Chinese Paralympic high jumper

Medal record

Men's athletics

Representing China

Paralympic Games
Gold medal – first place	1996 Atlanta	High jump
Gold medal – first place	2000 Sydney	High jump
Gold medal – first place	2004 Athens	High jump

Hou Bin (Chinese: 侯斌; pinyin: Hóu Bīn; born 1975 in Jiamusi, Heilongjiang Province) is a Chinese Paralympic track and field high jumper. In 2008, he was named a Paralympian Ambassador.

He lost his left leg in an accident at the age of nine. He subsequently became a Paralympian, and represented China at the 1996 Summer Paralympics in Atlanta. He won gold in the high jump with a jump of 1.92 metres. He successfully defended his title by winning gold again at the 2000 and 2004 Paralympics.

Hou was selected to light the Paralympic flame during the Opening Ceremony of the 2008 Summer Paralympics in Beijing. He lifted himself and his wheelchair up on a rope by strength of arms to the top of Beijing National Stadium, where he lit the cauldron to mark the beginning of the Games.

Since retirement, Hou has become a motivational speaker, and in 2013, he launched "Stand Up Again," a fundraising project for injured children who needed prosthetics after the Ya'an and Wenchuan earthquakes.
