= Fatimata Diasso =

Ivorian Paralympic athlete

Personal information
- Full name: Fatimata Brigitte Diasso
- National team: Ivory Coast
- Born: 18 June 1990 (age 36) Dabou, Côte d'Ivoire

Sport
- Country: Ivory Coast
- Sport: Para-athletics
- Disability: Visual impairment
- Disability class: T11
- Events: Long jump, 100 metres, 200 metres
Medal record
Women's para-athletics
Representing Ivory Coast
Paralympic Games
Silver medal – second place	2016 Rio de Janeiro	Long jump T11
- Updated on 5 November 2017

Fatimata Brigitte Diasso (born 18 June 1990) is an Ivorian athlete who competes in the long jump, 100 and 200 metres. She competes in the T11 visual impairment class, in which she won a silver medal in the long jump at the 2016 Summer Paralympics.

== Career ==
Since she was a child, Fatimata Diasso has had a visual impairment. She competes in the long jump, alongside a guide. Her disability class is T11, which means she has little to no visual ability. Fatima Diasso had been due to compete at the 2012 Summer Paralympics in London, England, but could not due to an injury. Diasso began training in France in 2014, joining the AJBO athletics club.

Diasso competed for the Ivory Coast at the 2016 Summer Paralympics in Rio de Janeiro, Brazil. Taking part in the women's T11 long jump, she finished second with a jump of 4.89 metres (16.0 ft) behind Brazil's Silvania de Oliveira. She also ran in the T11 100 metres and 200 metres, but failed to reach the podium in each case.

There was not a great deal of response in the Ivory Coast to Diasso's medal initially, but there was a call in the media for her to receive a similar award from the government as Olympic medallist Ruth Gbagbi. Diasso was subsequently awarded 40 million West African CFA franc and a villa for winning the silver medal.
