= Elizabeth Prinsloo =

South African Paralympic swimmer

Medal record

Swimming

Representing South Africa

Paralympic Games
Bronze medal – third place	1996 Atlanta	50 metre freestyle - S10

Elizabeth Prinsloo is a paralympic swimmer from South Africa competing mainly in category S10 events.

Elizabeth competed in both the 1996 and 2000 Summer Paralympics. In 1996 she won a bronze medal in the 50m freestyle, as well as finishing fifth in the 100m freestyle, sixth in the 100m butterfly but was disqualified in the heat of the 100m backstroke. In the 2000 games she finished fourth in the 50m freestyle, 100m freestyle and 100m backstroke and finished seventh in the 400m freestyle.
