= Liiudys Beliser =

Cuban Paralympic athlete

Medal record

Paralympic athletics

Representing Cuba

Paralympic Games
Gold medal – first place	1996 Atlanta	Discus Throw - F10-11
Silver medal – second place	1996 Atlanta	Javelin Throw - F10-11

Liudys Masso Beliser is a paralympic athlete from Cuba competing mainly in category F10–11 throwing events.

Liudys was part of the Cuban team that competed in America in the 1996 Summer Paralympics, There she competed in all three throws winning the gold medal in the discus and the silver in the javelin.

== Biography ==
From the age of 12 she developed a passion for athletics, initially practicing long-distance running before moving on to throwing events under the guidance of coach Eduardo Douglas Broock. At 15 she was admitted to a sports training school and took part in school competitions, showing strong potential. However, at the age of 18, due to the worsening of two eye conditions (which, although congenital, had not previously hindered her life), she turned to Paralympic sport. This transition also came about thanks to her meeting the young athlete Omar Turro Moya, who later became her husband and the father of her two children.

Liudis made her international debut at the Atlanta Paralympics in 1996. In the three events she contested, she finished fourth in the shot put, second in the javelin throw, and won the gold medal in the discus throw. This was followed by the 1998 IBSA World Championships, where she won two medals, and the Parapan American Games (first edition, held in Mexico City), where she achieved a triple gold. At the Sydney Paralympics she competed only in the discus throw, again winning the gold medal.

Her athletic career was not particularly long, as she devoted herself to family life. However, she did not leave sport entirely and in recent years has served as a coach for the Cuban Paralympic team at the Dubai World Championships. Deeply connected to her country, she considers it a priority to pass on the values that led her to become a champion.

== Achievements ==
Year	Competition	Venue	Event	Result	Performance	Notes
1996	Paralympic Games	(United States) Atlanta	Shot put F10–11	4th	10.78 m	
1996	Paralympic Games	(United States) Atlanta	Discus throw T10–11	Gold	45.06 m	
1996	Paralympic Games	(United States) Atlanta	Javelin throw F10–11	Silver	31.92 m	
1998	IBSA World Championships	(Spain) Madrid	Shot put F11	Silver		
1998	IBSA World Championships	(Spain) Madrid	Discus throw F11	Gold		
1999	Parapan American Games	Mexico City	Shot put F11	Gold		
1999	Parapan American Games	Mexico City	Discus throw F11	Gold		
1999	Parapan American Games	Mexico City	Javelin throw F11	Gold		
2000	Paralympic Games	(Australia) Sydney	Discus throw F13	Gold	44.67 m	
