= Joerg Schiedek =

German Paralympic athlete

Medal record

Paralympic athletics

Representing Germany

Paralympic Games
Gold medal – first place	1996 Atlanta	Javelin Throw - F46
Bronze medal – third place	2000 Sydney	Javelin Throw - F46

Joerg Schiedek is a paralympic athlete from Germany competing mainly in category F46 javelin events.

== Biography ==
Joerg Schiedek has competed in the javelin at three Paralympics, winning the gold medal in 1996 and the bronze medal in 2000 he also competed in the 4 × 100 m relay and long jump at the 1992 Summer Paralympics and the 4 × 400 m relay at the 2000 games.
