= Francisco Jesús Mendez =

Spanish Paralympic athlete

Medal record

Paralympic athletics

Representing Spain

Paralympic Games
| Bronze medal – third place | 1996 Atlanta | Discus Throw - F53 |
| Bronze medal – third place | 2000 Sydney | Shot Put - F54 |

Francisco Jesus Mendez is a paralympic athlete from Spain competing mainly in category F54 throwing events.

Mendez competed in two paralympics in 1996 Summer Paralympics and 2000 Summer Paralympics both times competing in the shot, discus and javelin. In 1996 he won a bronze medal in the discus while in 2000 he won one in the shot put.
