= Moisés Esmeralda =

Spanish Paralympic athlete

Medal record

Men's para-athletics

Representing Spain

Paralympic Games
Silver medal – second place	1996 Atlanta	Long Jump - F11

Moises Esmeralda is a paralympic athlete from Spain competing mainly in category F11 long and triple jump events.

Moises was amongst the Spanish team that travelled to Atlanta for the 1996 Summer Paralympics where he competed in the triple jump and long jump. Unfortunately he failed to registered a performance in the long jump before finishing second in the long jump to France's Stephane Bozzolo who won in a new Paralympic record.
