= Jerry Deets =

American Paralympic athlete

Personal information
- Full name: Jerry Marc Deets
- Born: 1 November 1947 Denver, Colorado, United States
- Died: 14 March 2002 (aged 54) Santa Cruz, California, United States

Sport
- Sport: Paralympic athletics
- Disability class: F53
Medal record
United States
Representing United States
Paralympic Games
Bronze medal – third place	1996 Atlanta	Pentathlon P53-57
Bronze medal – third place	1996 Atlanta	Shot put F53

Jerry Marc Deets (November 1, 1947 – March 14, 2002) was a Paralympian athlete from the United States competing mainly in category F53 pentathlon and field events.

He competed in the 1996 Summer Paralympics in Atlanta, United States. There he won a bronze medal in the men's pentathlon P53-57 event, a bronze medal in the men's shot put F53 event and finished fourth in the men's javelin throw F53 event. All this accomplished at 47 years of age. He participated in many international events in track and field as well as wheelchair road racing. He was inducted to Adaptive Sports Hall of Fame in 1999 following his success in wheelchair athletics.

Deets died at the age of 54 in Santa Cruz in 2002.
