= Ebert Kleynhans =

South African Paralympic swimmer

Medal record

Swimming

Representing South Africa

Paralympic Games
Gold medal – first place	1996 Atlanta	50 metre freestyle - B3
Gold medal – first place	2000 Sydney	50 metre freestyle - S12
Gold medal – first place	2000 Sydney	100 metre freestyle - S12
Silver medal – second place	1996 Atlanta	100 metre freestyle - B3

Ebert Kleynhans is a paralympic swimmer from South Africa competing mainly in category B3 events.

Ebert competed at three Paralympics winning three gold medals and one silver. His first games were in 1996 where he won the 50m freestyle in a new games record. He then finished second in the 100m freestyle behind Canadian Walter Wu, who set a new games record. He finished fifth in the 400m freestyle, fifth in the 100m butterfly and was disqualified in the breaststroke.

In the 2000 and 2004 he competed in the 50m and 100m freestyle and the 100m butterfly. At the 2000 games he defended his 50m freestyle title in a new world record time and added the 100m freestyle and finished sixth in the 100m butterfly. At the 2004 games he could only manage seventh in the 50m freestyle and eighth in the 100m freestyle as well as missing out on the final of the 100m butterfly.
