= Abdel Jabbar Dhifallah =

Tunisian Paralympic athlete

Medal record

Paralympic athletics

Representing Tunisia

Paralympic Games
Silver medal – second place	1996 Atlanta	Discus Throw - F36

Abdel Jabbar Dhifallah is a paralympic athlete from Tunisia competing mainly in category F37 javelin events.

Abdel Jabbar has been a part of three Tunisian teams at the Paralympics. His first games were in 1996 when he competed in the javelin and discus, finishing seventh in the javelin but winning silver in the discus. He then missed the 2000 games but did compete in javelin in both 2004 where he finished fourth and 2008 where he finished ninth.
