= Alicia Martinez (athlete) =

Spanish Paralympic athlete

Medal record

Paralympic athletics

Representing Spain

Paralympic Games
Bronze medal – third place	1996 Atlanta	200 metres - T34-37

Alicia Martinez is a paralympic athlete from Spain competing mainly in category T37 sprint events.

Alicia was part of the Spanish athletics team at both the 1996 and 2000 Summer Paralympics. In 1996 she finished seventh in the 100m and won a bronze medal in the 200m. In Sydney in 2000 she improved to fifth in the 100m but slipped back in the 200m and did not make the final and finished sixth in the 400m.
