= Alejandro Guerrero =

Mexican Paralympic athlete

Medal record

Paralympic athletics

Representing Mexico

Paralympic Games
Gold medal – first place	1996 Atlanta	10000 metres - T10
Silver medal – second place	1996 Atlanta	5000 metres - T10

Alejandro Guerrero is a paralympic athlete from Mexico competing mainly in category T11 distance running events.

Alejandro was part of the Mexican team who travelled to Atlanta for the 1996 Summer Paralympics, there he competed in the 5000m where he won the silver medal and also in the 10000m where he won the gold medal. He also competed in the 2000 Summer Paralympics in Sydney in the same two events but without any medal success.
