= Jacobus Jonker =

South African Paralympic athlete

Medal record

Paralympic athletics

Representing South Africa

Paralympic Games
Silver medal – second place	1996 Atlanta	Javelin Throw - F36

Jacobus Jonker is a paralympic athlete from South Africa competing mainly in category F36 throwing events.

Jacobus was part of the South African team that competed in the 1996 Summer Paralympics where, as well as competing in the discus, he won a silver medal in the F36 javelin.
