= Malcolm Pringle =

South African Paralympic athlete

Medal record

Paralympic athletics

Representing South Africa

Paralympic Games
Gold medal – first place	1996 Atlanta	800 metres - T37
Gold medal – first place	2000 Sydney	800 metres - T38
Gold medal – first place	2004 Athens	800 metres - T38
Silver medal – second place	1996 Atlanta	1500 metres - T37
Silver medal – second place	1996 Atlanta	400 metres - T37
Silver medal – second place	2004 Athens	400 metres - T38
Bronze medal – third place	2000 Sydney	400 metres - T38

Malcolm Pringle is a paralympic athlete from South Africa competing mainly in category T38 sprint and middle-distance events.

Malcolm competed in three Paralympics in 1996, 2000 and 2004. In each games he won the gold medal in the 800m. In the 1996 games he also won silvers in the 1500m and 400m. In the 2000 games he won a bronze in the 400m and competed as part of the South Africa 4 × 100 m team. In his final games he won his second 400m silver as well as competing in the 200m and the 4 × 100 m.
