= Leon Labuschagne =

South African Paralympic athlete

Medal record

Paralympic athletics

Representing South Africa

Paralympic Games
Gold medal – first place	1992 Barcelona	Discus Throw - THW4
Gold medal – first place	1996 Atlanta	Discus Throw - F53

Leon Labuschagne is a paralympic athlete from South Africa competing mainly in category F53 shot and discus events.

Leon competed in two paralympics, firstly in Barcelona in 1992 where he competed in the shot put and won the THW4 discus. Four years later he again won the discus, this time in the F53 class and finished fourth in the shot put.
