= Gert van der Merwe =

South African Paralympic athlete

Medal record

Paralympic athletics

Representing South Africa

Paralympic Games
Gold medal – first place	1996 Atlanta	Shot Put - F36
Gold medal – first place	2000 Sydney	Shot Put - F37

Gert van der Merwe was a Paralympic athlete from South Africa who competed mainly in category F37 throwing events.

Gert started competing in the Paralympics in 1996 competing in the discus and shot put, winning gold in the latter. He also competed in the 2000 Summer Paralympics where he defended his shot put title and also competed in the javelin and as part of the South African 4 × 100 m relay team.
