= Stephanus Lombaard =

South African Paralympic athlete

Medal record

Paralympic athletics

Representing South Africa

Paralympic Games
Gold medal – first place	1996 Atlanta	Shot Put - F57
Gold medal – first place	1996 Atlanta	Javelin Throw - F57
Bronze medal – third place	1996 Atlanta	Discus Throw - F57

Stephanus Lombaard OIS is a Paralympic athlete from South Africa who competes mainly in category F57 throwing events.

Stephanus was part of the South African team that travelled to the 1996 Summer Paralympics where he competed in all three throws in the F57 class winning gold in the shot put and javelin and silver in the discus.
