= Guillermo Pérez (athlete) =

Cuban Paralympic athlete

Medal record

Paralympic athletics

Representing Cuba

Paralympic Games
Gold medal – first place	1996 Atlanta	Javelin Throw - F42

Guillermo Pérez is a paralympic athlete from Cuba competing mainly in category F42 throwing events.

Guillermo Perez has competed at three Paralympics 1992, 1992 and 1996. Each time he competed in the shot, discus and javelin but his only medal came in the javelin in 1996 when he won the gold medal. Guillermo also competed in the 1992 powerlifting competition in the over 100 kg category but was unable to medal.
