= Victor Joukovski =

Belarusian Paralympic athlete

Medal record

Track and field (P10)

Representing Belarus

Paralympic Games
Bronze medal – third place	1996 Atlanta	Pentathlon - P10
Bronze medal – third place	1996 Atlanta	Triple Jump - F10

Victor Joukovski (Belarusian: Віктар Жукоўскі) is a Paralympian athlete from Belarus competing mainly in category P10 pentathlon events.

He competed in the 1996 Summer Paralympics in Atlanta, Georgia, United States. There he won a bronze medal in the men's Pentathlon - P10 event, a bronze medal in the men's Triple jump - F10 event and finished fourth in the men's Long jump - F10 event
