= Enrique Caballero =

Cuban Paralympic athlete

Medal record

Track and field (athletics)

Representing Cuba

Paralympic Games
Gold medal – first place	1996 Atlanta	Long Jump - F12
Gold medal – first place	1996 Atlanta	Triple Jump - F12
Silver medal – second place	1996 Atlanta	100 metres - T12

Enrique Caballero is a paralympic athlete from Cuba competing mainly in category F12 jumping events.

Enrique was part of the Cuban team that travelled to the 1996 Summer Paralympics in Atlanta. There he was successful in winning gold in both the F12 long and triple jumps and silver behind Italian Aldo Manganaro in the T12 100m.
