= IPass Inc. =

Internet software and services company

iPass Inc.
- Type: Public
- Traded as: Nasdaq: IPAS
- Industry: Internet software and services
- Founded: 1996; 30 years ago in California, United States
- Founder: Chris Moore
- Headquarters: Redwood Shores, California, United States
- Key people: Gary Griffiths (president and CEO)
- Services: Wi-Fi
- Revenue: ▼$62,564,000 (2015); $69,804,000 (2014)
- Operating income: ▲ ($14,911,000) (2015); ($19,449,000) (2014)
- Net income: ▼ ($15,493,000) (2015); $6,974,000 (2014)
- Total assets: ▼$37,843,000 (2015); $55,255,000 (2014)
- Total equity: ▼$22,601,000 (2015); $38,481,000 (2014)
- Number of employees: ▼205 (2015); 250 (2014)
- Parent: Pareteum
- Website: ipass.com

iPass Inc. was an American multinational company headquartered in Redwood Shores, California, that provided internet software and services. The firm was first incorporated in California in July 1996 and later reincorporated in Delaware in June 2000. The company's stock was added to the NASDAQ on July 24, 2003.

== History ==
iPass was founded in January 1996 by Chris Moore, Moore was later replaced by Michael H. Mansouri, who took the position of chairman, President and CEO in 1999, serving until 2001. Kenneth Denman succeeded Mansouri as president and CEO in 2001, later assuming the position of chairman in 2003.

In July 2003, the firm successfully issued its IPO, raising over $100 million.

In 2004, the firm launched a policy orchestration initiative to integrate patch management, assessment and remediation of remote and mobile computers into its connectivity platform. In pursuing this initiative, iPass acquired two companies in 2004: Safe3w, which developed patented dynamic device “fingerprinting” technology, and Mobile Automation, which specialized in mobile device management.

Two years later, iPass acquired GoRemote Internet Communications, a company in the corporate remote access market. In the midst of these acquisitions, iPass recorded year-end revenue growth, despite declining revenues from the company's traditional dial-up business. Overall, total revenues grew to $192 million by the end of 2007.

Evan Kaplan succeeded Denman as CEO and President in 2008. During Kaplan's tenure, the firm began to build a service delivery platform for its new enterprise mobility services. By January 2010, the company delivered the first version of its cloud-based platform, iPass Open Mobile.

In 2015 there were changes in the firm's executive team, beginning with the appointment of Gary Griffiths to the position of CEO and President. Griffiths and his newly appointed Chief Commercial Officer, Patricia Hume, pursued a new growth strategy for mobile services, launching iPass Unlimited, a per-user, per-month, fixed fee subscription for unlimited Wi-Fi usage. The firm also expanded its network of global hotspots by 2015 from 18 million to 50 million. In November 2015, the firm announced iPass SmartConnect.

In November 2018, the company entered an agreement to be acquired by Pareteum, a provider of communications platform-as-a-service. February 2019, Pareteum closed its acquisition of iPass in an all-stock transaction.

== Products and services ==
iPass is a cloud-based service manager that connects users and devices to the company's global Wi-Fi footprint. It is an application, downloaded by service users to laptops, tablets, or smartphones, to identify and connect to the system's hotspots. It is compatible with Automatic Credential Assignment.

Derived from the company's connectivity intellectual property, the app is powered by iPass SmartConnect, iPass’ Wi-Fi service platform, which identifies and rates access points based on factors such as signal strength, speed, bandwidth availability, and connection success rate.

The platform also includes a proprietary scalable reporting and transaction clearing back-end.

=== Technology infrastructure ===
The company has a global network of integrated servers and software, with over 160 distinct global Wi-Fi networks.

=== Wi-Fi network ===
iPass has a Wi-Fi network footprint and supply chain that consists of more than 64 million hotspots in over 160 countries, including major airports, convention centers, planes, trains, train stations, hotels, restaurants, retail, and small business locations.
