= Wang Sen =

Chinese actor

- Born: 3 August 1989 (age 36); Beijing, China
- Occupation: Actor
- Years active: 2010s-present

Chinese name
- Traditional Chinese: 王森
- Simplified Chinese: 王森
Transcriptions
Standard Mandarin
- Hanyu Pinyin: Wáng Sēn

Wang Sen (born 3 August 1989) is a Chinese actor. Since 2013, he has signed to Zhao Wei's Agency.

== Filmography ==
=== Film ===
Year	Title	Director	Role	Notes
2011	My Name is Li Guangan 我叫李广安	Huo Wenze		
2013	So Young 致我们终将逝去的青春	Zhao Wei	Wang Yaming	
2013	Xia Ri Qi Shi 夏日启示	Chen Jialin	James	
2015	Wolf Warriors 战狼	Wu Jing	Shi Sanba	
2025	The Shallows	Banchang Xia		

=== Television ===
Year	Title	Director	Role	Notes
2015	Tiger Mom 虎妈猫爸	Yao Xiaofeng	Bi Ran	
2018	When We Were Young 人不彪悍枉少年	Deng Ke, Kao Tsung-Kai	Kong Xiaojun	
2020	"Count Your Lucky Stars" 我好喜欢你	Lin Zi Ping	Mu Yang	
2021	"Novoland: Pearl Eclipse" 斛珠夫人	Jin Sha	Fang Zhuoying	
