= Daniel Louw =

South African Paralympic athlete

Medal record

Paralympic athletics

Representing South Africa

Paralympic Games
Bronze medal – third place	1996 Atlanta	200 metres - T45-46

Daniel Louw is a paralympic athlete from South Africa competing mainly in category T46 sprint events.

Louw competed in the 1996 Summer Paralympics in Atlanta. He competed in all three sprints winning a bronze medal in the 200m and finishing fifth in both the 100m and 400m.
