= Paul Fernand Kra Koffi =

Ivorian Paralympic athlete

Medal record

Track and field (athletics)

Representing Ivory Coast

Paralympic Games
Bronze medal – third place	2000 Sydney	800 metres - T12

Paul Fernand Kra Koffi is a paralympic athlete from Côte d'Ivoire competing mainly in category T12 middle-distance events.

He competed in the 2000 Summer Paralympics in Sydney, Australia. He competed in the T12 1500m and 400m but it was in the 800m where he won a bronze medal
