= Ambrosio Zaldívar =

Cuban Paralympic athlete

Medal record

Paralympic athletics

Representing Cuba

Paralympic Games
Gold medal – first place	1996 Atlanta	400 metres - T12

Ambrosio Zaldívar is a paralympic athlete from Cuba competing mainly in category T12 track events.

Ambrosio was part of the Cuban team to travel to the 1996 Summer Paralympics in Atlanta. There he competed in the 1500m finishing seventh and won the gold medal n the T12 400m.
