= Catalina Rosales =

Mexican Paralympic athlete

Medal record

Paralympic athletics

Representing Mexico

Paralympic Games
Silver medal – second place	1996 Atlanta	Discus throw F41
Bronze medal – third place	1996 Atlanta	Shot put F41

Parapan American Games
Silver medal – second place	2007 Rio de Janeiro	Shot put F55-58
Silver medal – second place	2007 Rio de Janeiro	Discus throw F55-58
Silver medal – second place	2011 Guadalajara	Shot put F57/58

Catalina Rosales Montiel (Note: In this Spanish name, the first or paternal surname is Rosales and the second or maternal family name is Montiel.) is a paralympic athlete from Mexico competing mainly in category F58 throwing events.

Catalina's Paralympic games career has spanned four games and 16 years. Her first games came in 1992 Summer Paralympics in Barcelona where she competed in the discus, shot and javelin. She was to repeat these events again in 1996 Summer Paralympics this time winning silver in shot put and bronze in discus. These would prove to be her only Paralympic medals as despite competing in all three throws in 2004 and the discus and shot in 2008, she failed to add to her medal tally.
