= Omar Moya =

Cuban Paralympic athlete

Medal record

Paralympic athletics

Representing Cuba

Paralympic Games
Gold medal – first place	1996 Atlanta	200 metres - T11
Gold medal – first place	1996 Atlanta	400 metres - T11

Omar Moya is a paralympic athlete from Cuba competing mainly in category T11 sprint events.

Omar was part of the Cuban team that competed in the 1996 Summer Paralympics in Atlanta where he finished fourth in the final of the T11 100m and won gold in both the T11 200m and 400m.
