= Steyn Humphries =

South African Paralympic athlete

Medal record

Paralympic athletics

Representing South Africa

Paralympic Games
Gold medal – first place	1996 Atlanta	Discus Throw - F56
Silver medal – second place	1996 Atlanta	Shot Put - F56
Bronze medal – third place	1996 Atlanta	Javelin Throw - F56

Steyn Humphries is a paralympic athlete from South Africa competing mainly in category F55 throws events.

Steyn competed in all three throws at the 1996 Summer Paralympics in Atlanta winning gold in the F55 Discus, silver in the F56 shot put and bronze in the F56 javelin.
