= Wu Yanjian =

Chinese Paralympic athlete

Medal record

Men's para-athletics

Representing China

Paralympic Games
Silver medal – second place	1996 Atlanta	1500 m T44-46
Silver medal – second place	1996 Atlanta	5000 m T44-46
Bronze medal – third place	2000 Sydney	1500 m T46
Bronze medal – third place	2000 Sydney	5000 m T46

Wu Yanjian (Chinese: 吴彦俭; pinyin: Wú Yànjǐan) is a paralympic athlete from China competing mainly in category T46 distance running events.

He competed in two paralympics, firstly in 1996 where, as well as competing in the 800m and as part of the Chinese 4 × 100 m relay, he won silver in both the 1500m and 5000m. He returned for the 2000 Summer Paralympics where he competed in the Marathon and again won the bronze medal in the 1500m and 5000m.
