= Oumar Basakoulba Kone =

Ivorian Paralympic athlete

Medal record

Track and field (athletics)

Representing Ivory Coast

Paralympic Games
Gold medal – first place	1996 Atlanta	400 metres - T42-46
Gold medal – first place	1996 Atlanta	800 metres - T44-46
Gold medal – first place	2000 Sydney	800 metres - T46

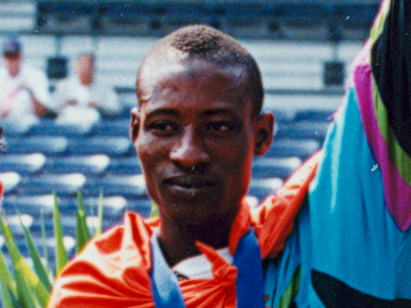
Oumar Basakoulba Kone as gold medallist in the 800m in the podium at the Atlanta 1996 Paralympic Games

Oumar Basakoulba Kone is a paralympic athlete from Côte d'Ivoire. He has competed in category T46 (limb deficiency, having had his right hand amputated), mainly in the 400m and 800m events.

Oumar has competed at a total of four Paralympics, starting in 1996 where he won gold in both the 800m (setting a world record, at 1 minute 55.45 secs) and 400m (in 50.23 seconds) as well as competing in the 1500m.

He repeated these events at the 2000 Summer Paralympics in Sydney, earning gold in the 800m. In his next two games in 1996 and 2008, he competed in just the 400m and 800m but was unable to add any further medals.
