= Wheelchair tennis at the Summer Paralympics =

- Governing body: ITF
- Events: 6 (men: 2; women: 2; mixed: 2)

Games
- 1960; 1964; 1968; 1972; 1976; 1980; 1984; 1988; 1992; 1996; 2000; 2004; 2008; 2012; 2016; 2020; 2024
- Note: demonstration sport years indicated in italics
- Medalists

Wheelchair tennis was first contested at the Summer Paralympics as a demonstration sport in 1988, with two events being held (men's and women's singles). It became an official medal-awarding sport in 1992 and has been competed at every Summer Paralympics since then. Four events were held from 1992 to 2000, with quad events (mixed gender) in both singles and doubles added in 2004.

== Summary ==
Games	Year	Events	Best nation
1			
2			
3			
4			
5			
6			
7			
8	1988	2	Netherlands
9	1992	4	Netherlands
10	1996	4	Netherlands
11	2000	4	Netherlands
12	2004	6	Netherlands
13	2008	6	Netherlands
14	2012	6	Netherlands
15	2016	6	Netherlands
16	2020	6	Netherlands
17	2024	6	Japan

== Events ==
Six events are contested at each Paralympic. Only men's and women's singles were held at the 1988 Paralympics, when it was a demonstration sport. These were joined by men's and women's doubles events four years later when the sport turned an official event. In 2004, two new events were added with quadriplegia (as such they are also known as "quad" events) and unlike the other events they are open. Until the 2024 Games, only two women competed in the event, the Dutch Monique de Beer and the Canadian Sarah Hunter, both competed in 2004 and 2008, but the Dutch is still the only woman to win a medal at the Paralympics, a bronze in the doubles event in 2004.

Current events

- Men's singles
- Men's doubles
- Women's singles
- Women's doubles
- Quad singles (Open)
- Quad doubles (Open)

== Historical medal table ==
Updated af the 2024 Summer Paralympics

Rank	Nation	Gold	Silver	Bronze	Total
1	Netherlands (NED)	25	18	14	57
2	Japan (JPN)	7	3	6	16
3	United States (USA)	6	7	6	19
4	France (FRA)	6	4	7	17
5	Australia (AUS)	5	7	3	15
6	Great Britain (GBR)	4	11	8	23
7	Sweden (SWE)	1	2	0	3
8	Israel (ISR)	1	1	3	5
9	Germany (GER)	0	1	4	5
10	Thailand (THA)	0	1	0	1
11	Argentina (ARG)	0	0	1	1
11	Belgium (BEL)	0	0	1	1
11	China (CHN)	0	0	1	1
11	South Africa (RSA)	0	0	1	1
11	Spain (ESP)	0	0	1	1
11	Switzerland (SUI)	0	0	1	1
Totals (16 entries)		55	55	57	167

== Medalists ==
Medal winners for every Summer Games since 1988 are as follows:

=== Men's singles ===
Year	Gold	Silver	Bronze
1988 Seoul demonstration	Laurent Giammartini; France	Mick Connell; Australia	Chip Turner; United States; Sasson Aharoni; Israel
1992 Barcelona	Randy Snow; United States	Kai Schramayer; Germany	Laurent Giammartini; France
1996 Atlanta	Ricky Molier; Netherlands	Stephen Welch; United States	David Hall; Australia
2000 Sydney	David Hall; Australia	Stephen Welch; United States	Kai Schramayer; Germany
2004 Athens	Robin Ammerlaan; Netherlands	David Hall; Australia	Michaël Jérémiasz; France
2008 Beijing	Shingo Kunieda; Japan	Robin Ammerlaan; Netherlands	Maikel Scheffers; Netherlands
2012 London	Shingo Kunieda; Japan	Stéphane Houdet; France	Ronald Vink; Netherlands
2016 Rio	Gordon Reid; Great Britain	Alfie Hewett; Great Britain	Joachim Gérard; Belgium
2020 Tokyo	Shingo Kunieda; Japan	Tom Egberink; Netherlands	Gordon Reid; Great Britain
2024 Paris	Tokito Oda; Japan	Alfie Hewett; Great Britain	Gustavo Fernández; Argentina

=== Women's singles ===
Year	Gold	Silver	Bronze
1988 Seoul demonstration	Chantal Vandierendonck; Netherlands	Monique Van Den Bosch; Netherlands	Terry Lewis; United States; Ellen de Lange; Netherlands
1992 Barcelona	Monique van den Bosch; Netherlands	Chantal Vandierendonck; Netherlands	Regina Isecke; Germany
1996 Atlanta	Maaike Smit; Netherlands	Monique Kalkman-van den Bosch; Netherlands	Chantal Vandierendonck; Netherlands
2000 Sydney	Esther Vergeer; Netherlands	Sharon Walraven; Netherlands	Maaike Smit; Netherlands
2004 Athens	Esther Vergeer; Netherlands	Sonja Peters; Netherlands	Daniela Di Toro; Australia
2008 Beijing	Esther Vergeer; Netherlands	Korie Homan; Netherlands	Florence Gravellier; France
2012 London	Esther Vergeer; Netherlands	Aniek van Koot; Netherlands	Jiske Griffioen; Netherlands
2016 Rio	Jiske Griffioen; Netherlands	Aniek van Koot; Netherlands	Yui Kamiji; Japan
2020 Tokyo	Diede de Groot; Netherlands	Yui Kamiji; Japan	Jordanne Whiley; Great Britain
2024 Paris	Yui Kamiji; Japan	Diede de Groot; Netherlands	Aniek van Koot; Netherlands

=== Quad singles ===
Year	Gold	Silver	Bronze
2004 Athens	Peter Norfolk; Great Britain	David Wagner; United States	Bas van Erp; Netherlands
2008 Beijing	Peter Norfolk; Great Britain	Johan Andersson; Sweden	David Wagner; United States
2012 London	Noam Gershony; Israel	David Wagner; United States	Nicholas Taylor; United States
2016 Rio	Dylan Alcott; Australia	Andrew Lapthorne; Great Britain	David Wagner; United States
2020 Tokyo	Dylan Alcott; Australia	Sam Schröder; Netherlands	Niels Vink; Netherlands
2024 Paris	Niels Vink; Netherlands	Sam Schröder; Netherlands	Guy Sasson; Israel

=== Men's doubles ===
Year	Gold	Silver	Bronze
1992 Barcelona	United States (USA); Brad Parks; Randy Snow	France (FRA); Thierry Caillier; Laurent Giammartini	Germany (GER); Stefan Bitterauf; Kai Schramayer
1996 Atlanta	United States (USA); Stephen Welch; Vance Parmelly	Australia (AUS); David Hall; Mick Connell	Netherlands (NED); Ricky Molier; Eric Stuurman
2000 Sydney	Netherlands (NED); Ricky Molier; Robin Ammerlaan	Australia (AUS); David Johnson; David Hall	United States (USA); Stephen Welch; Scott Douglas
2004 Athens	Japan (JPN); Shingo Kunieda; Satoshi Saida	France (FRA); Michaël Jérémiasz; Lahcen Majdi	Australia (AUS); Anthony Bonaccurso; David Hall
2008 Beijing	France (FRA); Stéphane Houdet; Michaël Jérémiasz	Sweden (SWE); Stefan Olsson; Peter Vikström	Japan (JPN); Shingo Kunieda; Satoshi Saida
2012 London	Sweden (SWE); Stefan Olsson; Peter Vikström	France (FRA); Frédéric Cattanéo; Nicolas Peifer	France (FRA); Stéphane Houdet; Michaël Jérémiasz
2016 Rio	France (FRA); Stéphane Houdet; Nicolas Peifer	Great Britain (GBR); Alfie Hewett; Gordon Reid	Japan (JPN); Shingo Kunieda; Satoshi Saida
2020 Tokyo	France (FRA); Stéphane Houdet; Nicolas Peifer	Great Britain (GBR); Alfie Hewett; Gordon Reid	Netherlands (NED); Tom Egberink; Maikel Scheffers
2024 Paris	Great Britain (GBR); Alfie Hewett; Gordon Reid	Japan (JPN); Takuya Miki; Tokito Oda	Spain (ESP); Daniel Caverzaschi; Martín de la Puente

=== Women's doubles ===
Year	Gold	Silver	Bronze
1992 Barcelona	Netherlands (NED); Monique van den Bosch; Chantal Vandierendonck	United States (USA); Nancy Olson; Lynn Seidemann	France (FRA); Oristelle Marx; Arlette Racineux
1996 Atlanta	Netherlands (NED); Chantal Vandierendonck; Monique Kalkman-van den Bosch	United States (USA); Hope Lewellen; Nancy Olson	France (FRA); Oristelle Marx; Arlette Racineux
2000 Sydney	Netherlands (NED); Maaike Smit; Esther Vergeer	Australia (AUS); Branka Pupovac; Daniela Di Toro	Germany (GER); Christine Otterbach; Petra Sax-Scharl
2004 Athens	Netherlands (NED); Maaike Smit; Esther Vergeer	Thailand (THA); Sakhorn Khanthasit; Ratana Techamaneewat	Switzerland (SUI); Sandra Kalt; Karin Suter-Erath
2008 Beijing	Netherlands (NED); Korie Homan; Sharon Walraven	Netherlands (NED); Jiske Griffioen; Esther Vergeer	France (FRA); Florence Gravellier; Arlette Racineux
2012 London	Netherlands (NED); Marjolein Buis; Esther Vergeer	Netherlands (NED); Jiske Griffioen; Aniek van Koot	Great Britain (GBR); Lucy Shuker; Jordanne Whiley
2016 Rio	Netherlands (NED); Jiske Griffioen; Aniek van Koot	Netherlands (NED); Marjolein Buis; Diede de Groot	Great Britain (GBR); Lucy Shuker; Jordanne Whiley
2020 Tokyo	Netherlands (NED); Diede de Groot; Aniek van Koot	Great Britain (GBR); Lucy Shuker; Jordanne Whiley	Japan (JPN); Yui Kamiji; Momoko Ohtani
2024 Paris	Japan (JPN); Yui Kamiji; Manami Tanaka	Netherlands (NED); Diede de Groot; Aniek van Koot	China (CHN); Guo Luoyao; Wang Ziying

=== Quad doubles ===
Year	Gold	Silver	Bronze
2004 Athens	United States (USA); Nicholas Taylor; David Wagner	Great Britain (GBR); Mark Eccleston; Peter Norfolk	Netherlands (NED); Monique de Beer; Bas van Erp
2008 Beijing	United States (USA); Nicholas Taylor; David Wagner	Israel (ISR); Boaz Kramer; Shraga Weinberg	Great Britain (GBR); Jamie Burdekin; Peter Norfolk
2012 London	United States (USA); Nicholas Taylor; David Wagner	Great Britain (GBR); Andrew Lapthorne; Peter Norfolk	Israel (ISR); Noam Gershony; Shraga Weinberg
2016 Rio	Australia (AUS); Dylan Alcott; Heath Davidson	United States (USA); Nicholas Taylor; David Wagner	Great Britain (GBR); Andrew Lapthorne; Peter Norfolk
2020 Tokyo	Netherlands (NED); Sam Schröder; Niels Vink	Australia (AUS); Dylan Alcott; Heath Davidson	Japan (JPN); Mitsuteru Moroishi; Koji Sugeno
2024 Paris	Netherlands (NED); Sam Schröder; Niels Vink	Great Britain (GBR); Andy Lapthorne; Gregory Slade	South Africa (RSA); Donald Ramphadi; Lucas Sithole

== Nations ==
Nation	60	64	68	72	76	80	84	88	92	96	00	04	08	12	16	20	Total
Argentina (ARG)											1	1	1	2	3	0	6
Australia (AUS)									4	4	4	4	3	4	5	2	8
Austria (AUT)									2	4	2	4	3	3	2	0	8
Belgium (BEL)									1	1	4		2	3	2	0	7
Brazil (BRA)										2		2	2	5	8	7	6
Canada (CAN)									2	2	4	4	4	2	1	0	8
Chile (CHI)												2	2	4	3	0	5
China (CHN)												2	4		4		3
Chinese Taipei (TPE)											2	2			1		3
Colombia (COL)													2	3	6		3
Czech Republic (CZE)												1					1
Denmark (DEN)													1				1
Finland (FIN)										2			1				2
France (FRA)									5	5	3	6	6	5	6		7
Germany (GER)									3	5	5	2	1	2	1		7
Great Britain (GBR)									4	4	5	10	8	10	10		7
Greece (GRE)												1			1		2
Hungary (HUN)										2	2	2	2	1	1		6
Indonesia (INA)												2	1				2
Iran (IRI)														1			1
Iraq (IRQ)														1			1
Israel (ISR)									4	4	2	1	3	3	3		7
Italy (ITA)									2	2	2	4	6	4	3		7
Japan (JPN)									3	4	4	8	9	9	9		7
Malaysia (MAS)												1			1		2
Mexico (MEX)										2	2						2
Morocco (MAR)														1			1
Netherlands (NED)									3	5	7	8	11	8	6		7
New Zealand (NZL)									2	2	2	3					4
Nigeria (NGR)													1	2			2
Poland (POL)										2	2	5	4	4	2		6
Romania (ROU)													1				1
Russia (RUS)										2	1	1	1				4
Slovakia (SVK)												2	3	1			3
South Africa (RSA)												2	2	4	4		4
South Korea (KOR)										2	2	4	4	4	3		6
Spain (ESP)									3	2	2	4	3	4	4		7
Sri Lanka (SRI)												2	1	2	1		4
Sweden (SWE)									2	2	2	3		4	2		6
Switzerland (SUI)									2	4	2	4	3	2			6
Thailand (THA)										2	4	4	2	4	2		6
Turkey (TUR)													1		1		2
United States (USA)									6	6	6	11	9	9	9		7
Zimbabwe (ZIM)														1			1
Nations									16	24	24	32	35	31	29		
Competitors									48	72	72	112	112	112	100		
Year	60	64	68	72	76	80	84	88	92	96	00	04	08	12	16	20	

== See also ==
- Tennis at the Summer Olympics
