= Wheelchair tennis at the 1992 Summer Paralympics – Women's singles =

Wheelchair tennis – Women's singles at the IX Paralympic Games
- Paralympic wheelchair tennis

Medalists
1st place, gold medalist(s)		Monique van den Bosch	Netherlands
2nd place, silver medalist(s)		Chantal Vandierendonck	Netherlands
3rd place, bronze medalist(s)		Regina Isecke	Germany

Women's singles
- Wheelchair tennis at the 1992 Summer Paralympics

Events
Singles	men	women
Doubles	men	women
← 1988 ·	Summer Paralympics	· 1996 →

The women's singles wheelchair tennis competition at the 1992 Summer Paralympics in Barcelona.

== Draw ==
=== Key ===
- INV = Bipartite invitation
- IP = ITF place
- ALT = Alternate
- r = Retired
- w/o = Walkover

=== Finals ===
Semifinals
Monique van den Bosch (NED)	6	6
Regina Isecke (GER)	0	2
Janet McMorran (GBR)	2	0
Chantal Vandierendonck (NED)	6	6

Final (gold medal match)
Monique van den Bosch (NED)	6	6
Chantal Vandierendonck (NED)	3	4
Bronze medal match
Regina Isecke (GER)	6	6	6
Janet McMorran (GBR)	3	7	3

==== Top half ====
1/8-Final
M van den Bosch (NED)	6	6
T Aharoni (ISR)	0	2
R Hinson (AUS)	3	0
N Olson (USA)	6	6
R Isecke (GER)	6	6
S Twelftree (AUS)	1	1
A Racineux (FRA)	6	6
M Miller (ISR)	0	3

Quarterfinals
M van den Bosch (NED)	6	4	7
N Olson (USA)	3	6	6
R Isecke (GER)	6	6
A Racineux (FRA)	1	3

Semifinals
M van den Bosch (NED)	6	6
R Isecke (GER)	0	2

==== Bottom half ====
1/8-Final
A Velasco (ESP)	2	1
K Kitamoto (JPN)	6	6
J McMorran (GBR)	7	6
E de Lange (NED)	6	4
C Blackmore (GBR)	2	1
O Marx (FRA)	6	6
L Seidemann (USA)	0	2
C Vandierendonck (NED)	6	6

Quarterfinals
K Kitamoto (JPN)	4	2
J McMorran (GBR)	6	6
O Marx (FRA)	1	5
C Vandierendonck (NED)	6	7

Semifinals
J McMorran (GBR)	2	0
C Vandierendonck (NED)	6	6
