= Wheelchair tennis at the 1996 Summer Paralympics – Women's singles =

Wheelchair tennis – Women's singles at the X Paralympic Games
- Paralympic wheelchair tennis
- Dates: 16–25 August 1996

Medalists
1st place, gold medalist(s)		Maaike Smit	Netherlands
2nd place, silver medalist(s)		Monique Kalkman-van den Bosch	Netherlands
3rd place, bronze medalist(s)		Chantal Vandierendonck	Netherlands

Women's singles
- Wheelchair tennis at the 1996 Summer Paralympics

Events
Singles	men	women
Doubles	men	women
← 1992 ·	Summer Paralympics	· 2000 →

The women's singles wheelchair tennis competition at the 1996 Summer Paralympics in Atlanta from 16 August until 25 August.

== Draw ==
=== Key ===
- INV = Bipartite invitation
- IP = ITF place
- ALT = Alternate
- r = Retired
- w/o = Walkover

=== Finals ===
Semifinals
Monique Kalkman-van den Bosch (NED)	6	6
Chantal Vandierendonck (NED)	3	2
Maaike Smit (NED)	6	6	6
Daniela Di Toro (AUS)	7	1	4

Final (gold medal match)
Monique Kalkman-van den Bosch (NED)	6	6	6
Maaike Smit (NED)	0	7	7
Bronze medal match
Chantal Vandierendonck (NED)	6	4	6
Daniela Di Toro (AUS)	4	6	3

==== Top half ====
1/16-Final
A Broadway-Parkinson (GBR)	3	1
M Fink (AUT)	6	6
C Ott (GER)	4	6
R Hinson (AUS)	6	7
K Wallach (ISR)	4	2
J Courtier (NZL)	6	6
M Ohmae (JPN)	6	6
E Hegi (SUI)	1	1

1/8-Final
M Kalkman-van den Bosch (NED)	6	6
M Fink (AUT)	2	1
R Hinson (AUS)	2	1
O Marx (FRA)	6	6
C Vandierendonck (NED)	6	6
J Courtier (NZL)	1	2
C Ohmae (JPN)	3	1
N Olson (USA)	6	6

Quarterfinals
M Kalkman-van den Bosch (NED)	6	6
O Marx (FRA)	3	1
C Vandierendonck (NED)	3	6	6
N Olson (USA)	6	0	2

Semifinals
M Kalkman-van den Bosch (NED)	6	6
C Vandierendonck (NED)	3	2

==== Bottom half ====
1/16-Final
T Aharoni (ISR)	3	2
I Kussian (AUT)	6	6
H Taroni (SUI)	4	6	3
C Seyen (BEL)	6	4	6
K Kitamoto (JPN)	6	6
M Stratford (NZL)	1	0
A Racineux (FRA)	6	2	2
J McMorran (GBR)	1	6	6

1/8-Final
R Isecke (GER)	6	6
I Kussian (AUT)	0	3
C Seyen (BEL)	3	1
M Smit (NED)	6	6
H Lewellen (USA)	1	6	5
K Kitamoto (JPN)	6	3	7
J McMorran (GBR)	4	1
D Di Toro (GBR)	6	6

Quarterfinals
R Isecke (GER)	4	3
M Smit (NED)	6	6
K Kitamoto (JPN)	4	1
D Di Toro (AUS)	6	6

Semifinals
M Smit (NED)	6	6	6
D Di Toro (AUS)	7	1	4
