= Wheelchair tennis at the 1992 Summer Paralympics =

- Edition: 1st

Champions

Men's singles
- (United States) Randy Snow

Women's singles
- (Netherlands) Monique Kalkman-Van Den Bosch

Men's doubles
- (United States) Brad Parks / Randy Snow

Women's doubles
- (Netherlands) Monique Kalkman-Van Den Bosch / Chantal Vandierendonck
Summer Paralympics	· 1996 →

Paralympic symbol (1988-1994)

Wheelchair tennis at the 1992 Summer Paralympics consisted of four events.

== Medal summary ==
Event	Gold	Silver	Bronze
Men's singles	Randy Snow; United States	Kai Schramayer; Germany	Laurent Giammartini; France
Men's doubles	United States (USA); Brad Parks; Randy Snow	France (FRA); Thierry Caillier; Laurent Giammartini	Germany (GER); Stefan Bitterauf; Kai Schramayer
Women's singles	Monique Van Den Bosch; Netherlands	Chantal Vandierendonck; Netherlands	Regina Isecke; Germany
Women's doubles	Netherlands (NED); Monique Van Den Bosch; Chantal Vandierendonck	United States (USA); Nancy Olson; Lynn Seidemann	France (FRA); Oristelle Marx; Arlette Racineux

Source: Paralympic.org

== Medal table ==
Rank	Nation	Gold	Silver	Bronze	Total
1	Netherlands (NED)	2	1	0	3
1	United States (USA)	2	1	0	3
3	France (FRA)	0	1	2	3
3	Germany (GER)	0	1	2	3
Totals (4 entries)		4	4	4	12
