= Wheelchair tennis at the 1992 Summer Paralympics – Women's doubles =

Wheelchair tennis – Women's doubles at the IX Paralympic Games
- Paralympic wheelchair tennis

Medalists
1st place, gold medalist(s)		Monique van den Bosch; Chantal Vandierendonck	Netherlands
2nd place, silver medalist(s)		Nancy Olson; Lynn Seidemann	United States
3rd place, bronze medalist(s)		Oristelle Marx; Arlette Racineux	France

Women's doubles
- Wheelchair tennis at the 1992 Summer Paralympics

Events
Singles	men	women
Doubles	men	women
← 1988 ·	Summer Paralympics	· 1996 →

The women's doubles wheelchair tennis competition at the 1992 Summer Paralympics in Barcelona.

== Draw ==
=== Key ===
- INV = Bipartite invitation
- IP = ITF place
- ALT = Alternate
- r = Retired
- w/o = Walkover

=== Finals ===
Quarterfinals
Monique van den Bosch (NED); Chantal Vandierendonck (NED)
BYE
Christine Blackmore (GBR); Janet McMorran (GBR)	6	6
Randa Hinson (AUS); Sue Twelftree (AUS)	0	4
Marlin Miller (ISR); Tiki Aharoni (ISR)	3	0
Nancy Olson (USA); Lynn Seidemann (USA)	6	6
BYE
Oristelle Marx (FRA); Arlette Racineux (FRA)

Semifinals
Monique van den Bosch (NED); Chantal Vandierendonck (NED)	6	6
Christine Blackmore (GBR); Janet McMorran (GBR)	0	0
Nancy Olson (USA); Lynn Seidemann (USA)	6	6
Oristelle Marx (FRA); Arlette Racineux (FRA)	4	4

Final (gold medal match)
Monique van den Bosch (NED); Chantal Vandierendonck (NED)	6	6
Nancy Olson (USA); Lynn Seidemann (USA)	2	3
Bronze medal match
Christine Blackmore (GBR); Janet McMorran (GBR)	3	2
Oristelle Marx (FRA); Arlette Racineux (FRA)	6	6
