= Wheelchair tennis at the 1996 Summer Paralympics =

- Date: 16–25 August 1996
- Edition: 2nd
- Location: Stone Mountain Tennis Center

Champions

Men's singles
- (Netherlands) Ricky Molier

Women's singles
- (Netherlands) Maaike Smit

Men's doubles
- (United States) Stephen Welch / Vance Parmelly

Women's doubles
- (Netherlands) Chantal Vandierendonck / Monique Kalkman-Van Den Bosch
← 1992 ·	Summer Paralympics	· 2000 →

Paralympic symbol (1994-2004)

Wheelchair tennis at the 1996 Summer Paralympics consisted of four events, singles and doubles competitions for men and women.

== Medal summary ==
Event	Gold	Silver	Bronze
Men's singles	Ricky Molier; Netherlands	Stephen Welch; United States	David Hall; Australia
Men's doubles	United States (USA); Stephen Welch; Vance Parmelly	Australia (AUS); David Hall; Mick Connell	Netherlands (NED); Eric Stuurman; Ricky Molier
Women's singles	Maaike Smit; Netherlands	Monique Kalkman-Van Den Bosch; Netherlands	Chantal Vandierendonck; Netherlands
Women's doubles	Netherlands (NED); Chantal Vandierendonck; Monique Kalkman-Van Den Bosch	United States (USA); Hope Lewellen; Nancy Olson	France (FRA); Oristelle Marx; Arlette Racineux

Source: Paralympic.org

=== Participating nations ===
- Australia (4)
- Austria (4)
- Belgium (1)
- Brazil (2)
- Canada (2)
- Finland (2)
- France (5)
- Germany (5)
- Great Britain (4)
- Hungary (2)
- Israel (4)
- Italy (2)
- Japan (4)
- Mexico (2)
- Netherlands (5)
- New Zealand (2)
- Poland (2)
- Russia (2)
- South Korea (2)
- Spain (2)
- Sweden (2)
- Switzerland (4)
- Thailand (2)
- United States (6)

== See also ==
- Tennis at the 1996 Summer Olympics
