= Wheelchair tennis at the 1996 Summer Paralympics – Women's doubles =

Wheelchair tennis doubles at 1996 Summer Paralympics

Wheelchair tennis – Women's doubles at the X Paralympic Games
- Paralympic wheelchair tennis
- Dates: 16–25 August 1996

Medalists
1st place, gold medalist(s)		Chantal Vandierendonck; Monique Kalkman-van den Bosch	Netherlands
2nd place, silver medalist(s)		Hope Lewellen; Nancy Olson	United States
3rd place, bronze medalist(s)		Oristelle Marx; Arlette Racineux	France

Women's doubles
- Wheelchair tennis at the 1996 Summer Paralympics

Events
Singles	men	women
Doubles	men	women
← 1992 ·	Summer Paralympics	· 2000 →

The women's doubles wheelchair tennis competition at the 1996 Summer Paralympics in Atlanta from 16 August until 25 August.

== Draw ==
=== Key ===
- INV = Bipartite invitation
- IP = ITF place
- ALT = Alternate
- r = Retired
- w/o = Walkover

=== Finals ===
Semifinals
Chantal Vandierendonck (NED); Monique Kalkman-van den Bosch (NED)	6	6
Randa Hinson (AUS); Daniela Di Toro (AUS)	1	0
Oristelle Marx (FRA); Arlette Racineux (FRA)	4	6	4
Hope Lewellen (USA); Nancy Olson (USA)	6	3	6

Final (gold medal match)
Chantal Vandierendonck (NED); Monique Kalkman-van den Bosch (NED)	6	6
Hope Lewellen (USA); Nancy Olson (USA)	1	0
Bronze medal match
Randa Hinson (AUS); Daniela Di Toro (AUS)	2	7	2
Oristelle Marx (FRA); Arlette Racineux (FRA)	6	6	6

==== Top half ====
Round of 16			Quarterfinals			Semifinals
			C Vandierendonck (NED); M Kalkman-van den Bosch (NED)	6	7
C Ohmae (JPN); K Kitamoto (JPN)	6	6	C Ohmae (JPN); K Kitamoto (JPN)	0	5
M Stratford (NZL); J Courtier (NZL)	0	1				C Vandierendonck (NED); M Kalkman-van den Bosch (NED)	6	6
						R Hinson (AUS); D Di Toro (AUS)	1	0
			T Aharoni (ISR); K Wallach (ISR)	1	1
			R Hinson (AUS); D Di Toro (AUS)	6	6

==== Bottom half ====
Round of 16			Quarterfinals			Semifinals
			O Marx (FRA); A Racineux (FRA)	7	6
J McMorran (GBR); A Broadway-Parkinson (GBR)	7	5	J McMorran (GBR); A Broadway-Parkinson (GBR)	5	4
M Fink (AUT); I Kussian (AUT)	5	3				O Marx (FRA); A Racineux (FRA)	4	6	4
C Ott (GER); R Isecke (GER)	6	6				H Lewellen (USA); N Olson (USA)	6	3	6
H Taroni (SUI); E Hegi (SUI)	2	1	C Ott (GER); R Isecke (GER)	0	1
			H Lewellen (USA); N Olson (USA)	6	6
