= Wheelchair tennis at the 1988 Summer Paralympics =

Wheelchair tennis at the VIII Paralympic Games
- Paralympic wheelchair tennis
- Venue: Seoul Olympic Park Tennis Center

Wheelchair tennis at the 1988 Summer Paralympics
- Edition: Demonstration sport

Champions

Men's singles
- (Netherlands) Laurent Giammartini

Women's singles
- (Netherlands) Monique Kalkman-Van Den Bosch
Summer Paralympics	· 1992 →

Paralympic symbol (1988-1994)

Wheelchair tennis at the 1988 Summer Paralympics consisted of men's and women's singles events. Despite wheelchair tennis being contested as a demonstration sport, and not an official part of the Paralympic program, medals were awarded and counted for the overall medal list.

== Medal summary ==
Event	Gold	Silver	Bronze
Men's singles	Laurent Giammartini; France	Mick Connell; Australia	Chip Turner; United States
Men's singles	Laurent Giammartini; France	Mick Connell; Australia	Sasson Aharoni; Israel
Women's singles	Chantal Vandierendonck; Netherlands	Monique Van Den Bosch; Netherlands	Terry Lewis; United States
Women's singles	Chantal Vandierendonck; Netherlands	Monique Van Den Bosch; Netherlands	Ellen de Lange; Netherlands

Source: Paralympic.org
