= Joseph Parker (athlete) =

American athlete (born 1978)

1996 Paralympic gold medalist

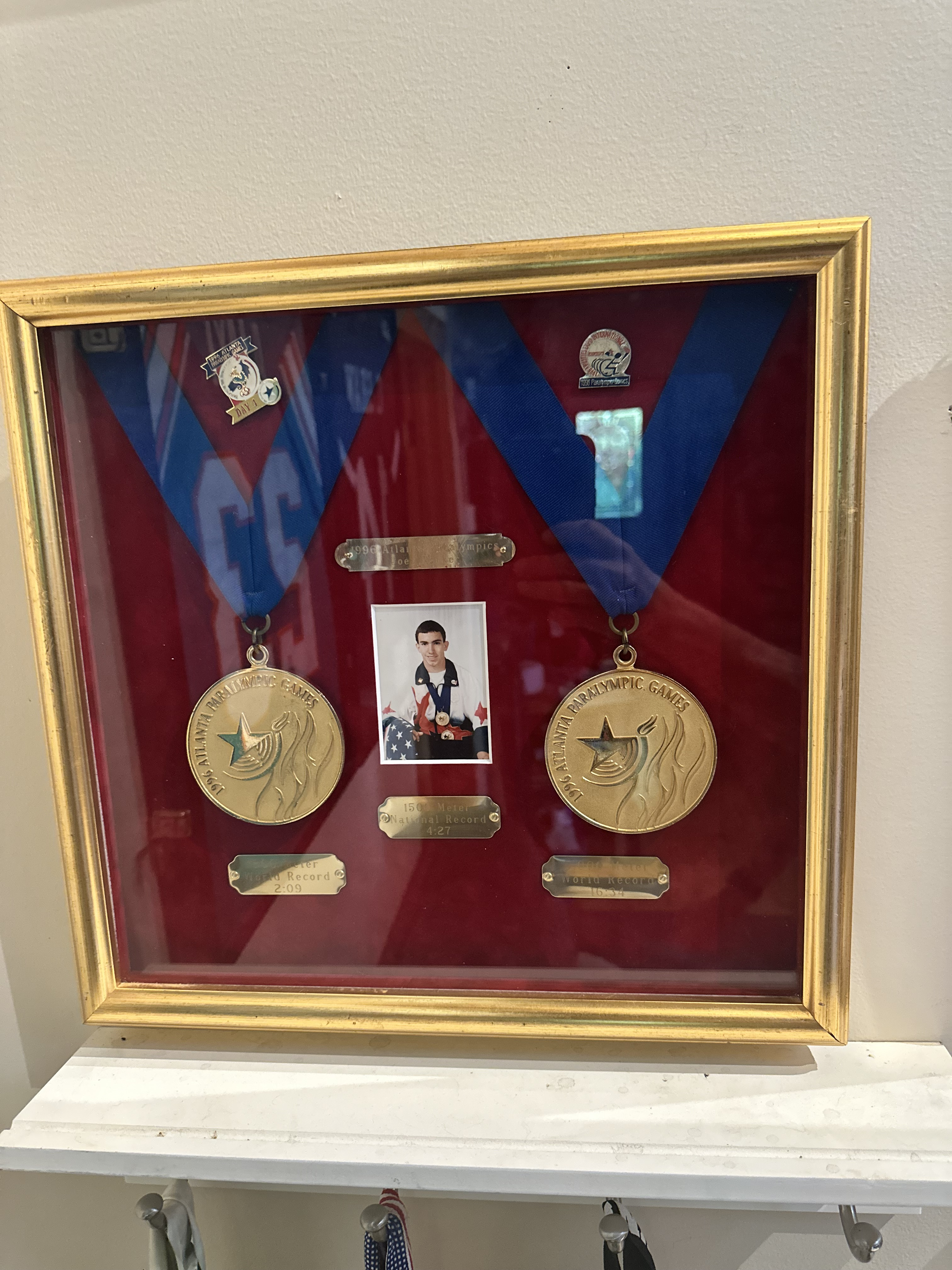
1996 Gold medals Paralympic games

Joseph Parker (born September 21, 1978) is an American athlete who, at the age of 17, won two Gold medals and broke 2 World records in the Men's 800m and 5000m events in the 1996 Summer Paralympics held in Atlanta. https://usopm.org/atlanta-1996-paralympic-games-american-gold-medalists/

United States at the 1996 Summer Paralympics

https://www.paralympic.org/atlanta-1996/results/athletics https://encrypted-tbn0.gstatic.com/images?q=tbn:ANd9GcQ7Uqd7RkhdLlKRngjpTwgan9VFycuCJbEbtXEQaE-S2nfBN-NrjKmBN0w&s

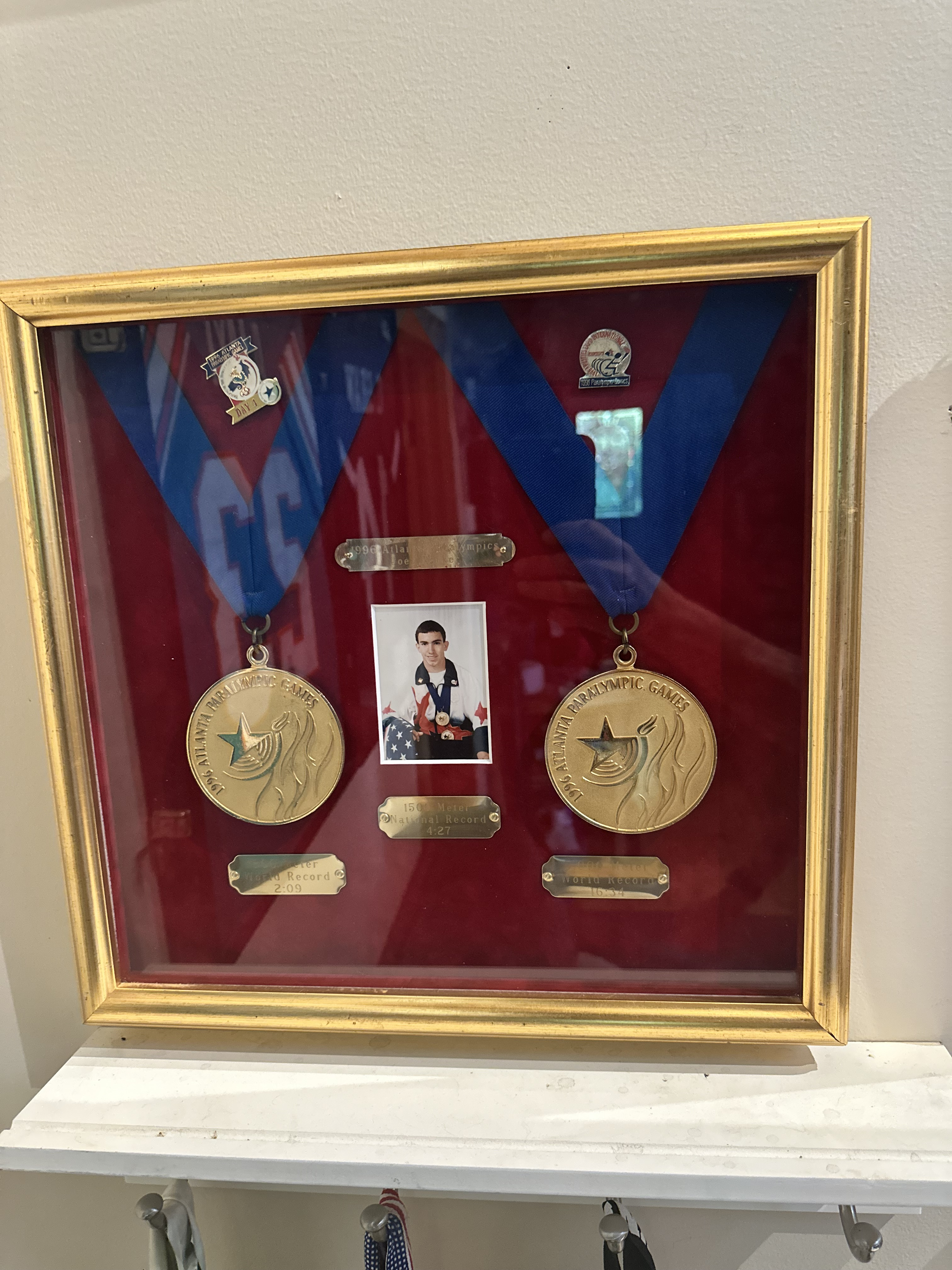
1996 Gold medals Paralympic games
