= Sailing at the 1996 Summer Paralympics =

Sailing at the X Paralympic Games
- Paralympic Sailing
- Venue: Lake Lanier, Aqualand Marin
- Competitors: 59 from 15 nations

Medalists
1st place, gold medalist(s)		Great Britain	Great Britain
2nd place, silver medalist(s)		Canada	Canada
3rd place, bronze medalist(s)		United States	United States

Paralympic symbol (1994–2004)

Sailing at the 1996 Summer Paralympics consisted of one event, which was open to any gender and sailed in the Sonar keelboats. This was the first time sailing has been included in the paralympics where the sport was a demonstration sport along with wheelchair rugby, and not an official part of the 14 core sports on the Paralympic program, but medals were awarded. Sailing in the 1996 Summer Olympics was held in Savannah but Paralympic event did not use those facilities, instead holding the event on Lake Lanier based around the Aqualand Marina. The distance between Savannah and Atlanta was probably the motivation for this as it was important to showcase the sport.

Rank	Team	R1	R2	R3	R4	R5	R6	R7	Total	Net
1	Great Britain (GBR); Andy Cassell, Kevin Curtis, Tony Downs, Ian Harrison	3	5	7	2	1; 0.75	1; 0.75	(9)	27.5	18.5
2	Canada (CAN); Kirk Westergaard, John McRoberts, Kenneth Kelly, David Cook	7	1; 0.75	(DNS)	1; 0.75	2	2	10	38.5	22.5
3	United States (USA); Waldo Esparza, James Leatherman, Christopher Murphy, John Ross-Duggan	5	4	5	4	5	(9)	4	36	27
4	Sweden (SWE); Asa Llinares, Stefan Giebner, Carl-Gustaf Fresk, Lars Bagge	(9)	7	4	7	3	4	1; 0.75	34.75	25.75
5	Switzerland (SUI); Philippe Moerch, Peter Murset, Georges Scherler	2	(10)	6	3	6	8	3	38	28
6	New Zealand (NZL); Christopher Wornall, Derek Stewart, Cameron Scott, Andrew May	1; 0.75	2	9	8	7	(12)	2	40.75	28.75
7	Netherlands (NED); Theodorus Bouwman, Udo Hessels, Pieter van Asten, Marijke Wolfswinkel	39.75								
8	Armenia (ARM); Stasik Nazaryan, Armen Martirosyan, Garush Danielyan, Hayk Abgaryan	40.00								
9	Ireland (IRL); Donal Buckley, Kevin Downing, Michael Hendra, John Sullivan	46.00								
10	Finland (FIN); Esko Miilukangas, Aarre Karjalainen, Jussi Hamalainen, Raimo Aromaa	50.00								
11	Germany (GER); Dietmar Budwill, Detlef Howah, Manfred Siekmann, Hildegard Bock	53.00								
12	Spain (ESP); Juan San Emeterio, Guillermo Poyan, Jose Maria Lastra, Carlos Fernandez	56.00								
13	Norway (NOR); Kjell Karlsen, Rolf Lilleaas, Jostein Stordahl, Ernst Torp	61.00								
14	Japan (JPN); Yutaka Wada, Masakazu Suto, Joji Kaido, Masao Hasegawa	65.00								
15	Poland (POL); Zbigniew Czarnecki, Boguslaw Grzelak, Jan Kaleta, Jacek Osada	84.00								
