= Wheelchair tennis at the 1988 Summer Paralympics – Women's singles =

Wheelchair tennis – Women's singles at the VIII Paralympic Games
- Paralympic wheelchair tennis

Medalists
| 1st place, gold medalist(s) | | Chantal Vandierendonck | Netherlands |
| 2nd place, silver medalist(s) | | Monique Van Den Bosch | Netherlands |
| 3rd place, bronze medalist(s) | | Terry Lewis | United States |
| 3rd place, bronze medalist(s) | | Ellen de Lange | Netherlands |

Women's singles
- Wheelchair tennis at the 1988 Summer Paralympics

Events
| Singles | men | women |
| Summer Paralympics | · 1992 → |

The women's singles wheelchair tennis competition at the 1988 Summer Paralympics in Seoul from 15 until 24 October 1988. It was a demonstration sport and there wasn't a match for the third place (two bronze medals were awarded)

== Draw ==
=== Key ===
- INV = Bipartite invitation
- IP = ITF place
- ALT = Alternate
- r = Retired
- w/o = Walkover

=== Finals ===
Semifinals
Monique Van Den Bosch (NED) | 6 | 6
Terry Lewis (USA) | 2 | 2
Chantal Vandierendonck (NED) | 6 | 6
Ellen de Lange (NED) | 1 | 1

Final (gold medal match)
Monique Van Den Bosch (NED) | 6 | 3 | 3
Chantal Vandierendonck (NED) | 0 | 6 | 6
