= Nancy Olson (tennis) =

American wheelchair tennis player (born 1957)

- Country (sports): United States
- Born: March 8, 1957 (age 68); Stony Point, New York
- Retired: 1999
Medal record
Paralympic Games
Silver medal – second place	1992 Barcelona	Doubles
Silver medal – second place	1996 Atlanta	Doubles

Nancy Olson (born March 8, 1957) is an American former wheelchair tennis player. She competed in two Summer Paralympics, winning two silver medals in doubles.

Olson graduated from Slippery Rock University.

== Career ==
At the 1992 Summer Paralympics, her first, Olson was eliminated in the singles quarter-finals by Monique Kalkman, while she reached the final in the doubles alongside Lynn Seidemann. The two lost to Kalkman and Chantal Vandierendonck, winning the silver medal. In the 1996 Summer Paralympics, her second and last, Olson again reached the quarter-finals in the singles, this time losing to Vandierendonck. In the doubles she also repeated her result from the last games by winning another silver medal. Together with Hope Lewellen she reached the final, which was again won by Monique Kalkman and Chantal Vandierendonck.

In the world rankings she achieved her best placings with third place in the singles on March 23, 1993, and the world ranking lead in the doubles on September 6, 1994. She played her last tournament in 1999 and retired.
