= Mali Miller =

Israeli Paralympic competitor

Personal information
- Born: 29 November 1950 Baghdad, Iraq

Sport
- Country: Israel
- Sport: Para swimming Wheelchair basketball Wheelchair tennis
- Disability: Polio
Medal record
Event / 1st / 2nd / 3rd; Paralympic Games / 1 / 3 / 1
Representing Israel
Paralympic Games
Paralympic swimming
Silver medal – second place	1968 Tel Aviv	3X25m ind. medley
Bronze medal – third place	1968 Tel Aviv	50m backstroke
Women's wheelchair basketball
Gold medal – first place	1968 Tel Aviv	Women's tournament
Silver medal – second place	1980 Arnhem	Women's tournament
Silver medal – second place	1984 New York	Women's tournament

Merlin Miller née Mezin (Hebrew: מרלין מילר; born 29 November 1950) is an Israeli former wheelchair basketball player, wheelchair tennis player and para swimmer who competed in the Summer Paralympic Games multiple times.

== Biography ==
Miller was born in Baghdad, Iraq and emigrated with her parents to Israel when she was one month old. At nine months she contracted polio and in 1966 she began practicing sports at the Israel Sports Center for the Disabled.

At the 1968 Summer Paralympics Miller competed in two swimming events and gained medals in both: a silver medal in the women's 3×25 metre individual medley open event and a bronze medal in the women's 50 metre backstroke special class event.

As a member of Israel women's national wheelchair basketball team Miller took part in the Paralympic Games in 1968 and again from 1980 to 1988. In these Paralympic games, the women's team won one gold medal (1968) and two silver edals (1980, 1984).

Miller competed at the 1992 Summer Paralympics in wheelchair tennis. In the women's singles tournament she was eliminated in the eighth final and in the doubles tournament she competed with Tikva Aharoni and reached the quarterfinal.

From 1972 to 1999 Miller worked for Elisra's economic department and in her retirement she is devoted to papier-mâché.
