= France at the 1996 Summer Paralympics =

- IPC code: FRA
- NPC: French Paralympic and Sports Committee
- Website: france-paralympique.fr

in Atlanta
- Competitors: 148 (123 men and 25 women)
- Medals Ranked 6th: Gold 35 Silver 29 Bronze 31 Total 95

Summer Paralympics appearances (overview)
- 1960; 1964; 1968; 1972; 1976; 1980; 1984; 1988; 1992; 1996; 2000; 2004; 2008; 2012; 2016; 2020; 2024

148 athletes (123 men and 25 women) from France competed at the 1996 Summer Paralympics in Atlanta, United States.

== Medallists ==
Medal	Name	Sport	Event
Gold	Claude Issorat	Athletics	Men's 200m T53
Gold	Claude Issorat	Athletics	Men's 400m T53
Gold	Claude Issorat; Philippe Couprie; Charles Tolle; Mustapha Badid	Athletics	Men's 4x400m relay T52-53
Gold	Stephane Bozzolo	Athletics	Men's long jump F11
Gold	Lutovico Halagahu	Athletics	Men's shot put F43-44
Gold	Luc Raoul	Cycling	Mixed 45/55k bicycle LC3
Gold	Patrick Ceria	Cycling	Mixed 55/65k bicycle LC2
Gold	David Mercier	Cycling	Mixed 65/75k bicycle LC1
Gold	Jean Bertrand; Franck Miquard	Cycling	Men's 100/120k tandem open
Gold	Thierry Gintrand; Patrice Senmartin	Cycling	Men's time trial tandem open
Gold	Éric Lindmann	Swimming	Men's 100m backstroke S7
Gold	Pascal Pinard	Swimming	Men's 100m breaststroke SB4
Gold	Éric Lindmann	Swimming	Men's 100m freestyle S7
Gold	Éric Lindmann	Swimming	Men's 200m medley SM7
Gold	Éric Lindmann	Swimming	Men's 400m freestyle S7
Gold	Béatrice Hess	Swimming	Women's 50m backstroke S5
Gold	Béatrice Hess	Swimming	Women's 50m butterfly S5
Gold	Béatrice Hess	Swimming	Women's 50m freestyle S5
Gold	Ludivine Loiseau	Swimming	Women's 50m freestyle S6
Gold	Béatrice Hess	Swimming	Women's 100m freestyle S5
Gold	Béatrice Hess	Swimming	Women's 200m freestyle S5
Gold	Béatrice Hess	Swimming	Women's 200m medley SM5
Gold	Bruno Bénédetti	Table tennis	Men's singles 4
Gold	Guy Tisserant	Table tennis	Men's singles 5
Gold	Gilles de la Bourdonnaye	Table tennis	Men's singles 10
Gold	Alain Pichon; Olivier Chateigner; Gilles de la Bourdonnaye	Table tennis	Men's team 9-10
Gold	Isabelle Lafaye	Table tennis	Women's singles 1-2
Gold	Michelle Sevin	Table tennis	Women's singles 10
Gold	Jean Rosier	Wheelchair fencing	Men's epée individual B
Gold	Yvon Pacault	Wheelchair fencing	Men's sabre individual A
Gold	Christian Lachaud; Cyril More; Yvon Pacault; Pascal Durand	Wheelchair fencing	Men's sabre team
Gold	Josette Bourgain; Sophie Belgodere-Paralitici; Patricia Picot; Murielle van de Cappelle	Wheelchair fencing	Women's epée team
Gold	Josette Bourgain	Wheelchair fencing	Women's foil individual A
Gold	Murielle van de Cappelle	Wheelchair fencing	Women's foil individual B
Gold	Josette Bourgain; Sophie Belgodere-Paralitici; Patricia Picot; Murielle van de Cappelle	Wheelchair fencing	Women's foil team
Silver	Jean Francois Garcia	Archery	Men's individual standing
Silver	Paul Gregori	Athletics	Men's 100m T42
Silver	Paul Gregori	Athletics	Men's 200m T42
Silver	Lamouri Rahmouni	Athletics	Men's 400m T36
Silver	Antoine Delaune	Athletics	Men's discus F32/33
Silver	Lutovico Halagahu	Athletics	Men's javelin F43-44
Silver	Patita Tuipoloto	Athletics	Men's javelin F46
Silver	Stephane Bozzolo	Athletics	Men's pentathlon P11
Silver	Eric Guezo; Vincent Mignon	Cycling	Men's time trial tandem open
Silver	Frederic Aguillaume	Equestrian	Mixed kur canter grade III
Silver	Gerald Rollo	Judo	Men's 71kg
Silver	Michele Amiel	Shooting	Women's standard rifle 3x20 SH1
Silver	Claude Badie	Swimming	Men's 50m backstroke S3
Silver	Pierre Bellot	Swimming	Men's 50m backstroke S4
Silver	Éric Lindmann	Swimming	Men's 50m freestyle S7
Silver	Pascal Pinard	Swimming	Men's 200m medley SM5
Silver	Corinne D'Urzo	Swimming	Women's 50m backstroke S5
Silver	Ludivine Loiseau	Swimming	Women's 100m freestyle S6
Silver	Ludivine Loiseau	Swimming	Women's 200m freestyle S6
Silver	Béatrice Hess; Ludivine Loiseau; Virginie Tripier; Corinne D'Urzo	Swimming	Women's 4x50m freestyle S1-6
Silver	Vincent Boury	Table tennis	Men's singles 2
Silver	Olivier Chateigner	Table tennis	Men's singles 9
Silver	Christophe Pinna; Bruno Bénédetti; Christophe Durand; Guy Tisserant	Table tennis	Men's teams 4-5
Silver	Anne-Marie Gibelin	Table tennis	Women's singles 1-2
Silver	Martine Thierry	Table tennis	Women's singles 6-8
Silver	Marie-Claire Odeide-Simian	Table tennis	Women's singles 9
Silver	Jean Rosier	Wheelchair fencing	Men's foil individual B
Silver	Jean Rosier; Pascal Durand; Yvon Pacault; Robert Citerne	Wheelchair fencing	Men's foil team
Silver	Sophie Belgodere-Paralitici	Wheelchair fencing	Women's foil individual A
Bronze	Marie Francoise Hybois	Archery	Women's individual standing
Bronze	Claude Issorat	Athletics	Men's 100m T53
Bronze	Patrice Gerges	Athletics	Men's 400m T42-46
Bronze	Mustapha Badid	Athletics	Men's 800m T53
Bronze	Christophe Carayon	Athletics	Men's 1500m T12
Bronze	Emmanuel Lacroix	Athletics	Men's 1500m T44-46
Bronze	Philippe Couprie	Athletics	Men's 1500m T52-53
Bronze	Emmanuel Lacroix	Athletics	Men's 5000m T44-46
Bronze	Joelle Vogel	Athletics	Women's 400m T52
Bronze	Eric Guezo; Vincent Mignon	Cycling	Men's 200m sprint tandem open
Bronze	Guy Rouchovze; Herve Dechamp	Cycling	Men's individual pursuit tandem open
Bronze	Patrick Celia	Cycling	Mixed omnium LC2
Bronze	Mixed	Equestrian	Mixed team open
Bronze	Cyril Morel	Judo	Men's 65kg
Bronze	Eric Censier	Judo	Men's +95kg
Bronze	Pascal Pinard	Swimming	Men's 50m backstroke S5
Bronze	Pascal Pinard	Swimming	Men's 50m butterfly S5
Bronze	Frederic Delpy	Swimming	Men's 400m freestyle S7
Bronze	Ludivine Loiseau	Swimming	Women's 200m medley SM6
Bronze	Hadda Guerchouche	Swimming	Women's 200m medley SM7
Bronze	Bruno Bénédetti	Table tennis	Men's open 1-5
Bronze	Gilles de la Bourdonnaye	Table tennis	Men's open 6-10
Bronze	Alain Pichon	Table tennis	Men's singles 9
Bronze	Marie-Claire Odeide-Simian	Table tennis	Women's open 6-10
Bronze	Martine Thierry; Michelle Sevin; Marie-Claire Odeide-Simian	Table tennis	Women's teams 6-10
Bronze	Arthur Bellance; Robert Citerne; Christian Lachaud; Jean Rosier	Wheelchair fencing	Men's epée team
Bronze	Pascal Durand	Wheelchair fencing	Men's foil individual B
Bronze	Pascal Durand	Wheelchair fencing	Men's sabre individual B
Bronze	Sophie Belgodere-Paralitici	Wheelchair fencing	Women's epée individual A
Bronze	Patricia Picot	Wheelchair fencing	Women's foil individual A
Bronze	Oristelle Marx; Arlette Racineux	Wheelchair tennis	Women's doubles

== See also ==
- France at the Paralympics
- France at the 1996 Summer Olympics
