= Monique Kalkman-Van Den Bosch =

Dutch wheelchair tennis player (born 1964)

Monique Kalkman-Van den Bosch
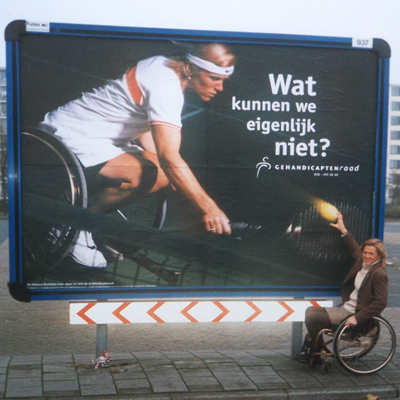

Personal information
- Nationality: Dutch
- Born: November 28, 1964 (age 61) Sint-Oedenrode, Netherlands
- Years active: 1984-1997
- Website: www.moniquekalkman.nl/index_english.html

Sport
- Country: Netherlands
- Sport: wheelchair tennis, table tennis, golf
Medal record
Representing Netherlands
Women's Table tennis
Summer Paralympics
Gold medal – first place	New York 1984	singles 4
Bronze medal – third place	New York 1984	Open 1B-4
Women's wheelchair tennis
Gold medal – first place	Barcelona 1992	singles
Gold medal – first place	Barcelona 1992	doubles
Gold medal – first place	Atlanta 1996	doubles
Silver medal – second place	Seoul 1988	singles
Silver medal – second place	Atlanta 1996	singles

Monique Kalkman-Van den Bosch
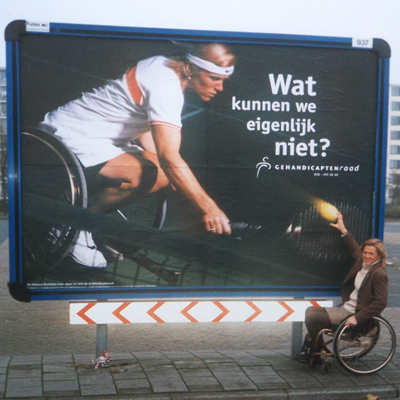
- Int. Tennis HoF: 2017 (member page)

Singles
- Career record: 151-25
- Highest ranking: 1

Other tournaments
- Masters: W (1994, 1995)

Doubles
- Highest ranking: 1

Monique Kalkman-Van den Bosch (born 28 November 1964) is a Dutch former professional wheelchair tennis and table tennis player. Monique competed at the Paralympics in 1984, 1988, 1992 and 1996. In 2017, she was inducted into the International Tennis Hall of Fame.

== Biography ==
Monique Van den Bosch was diagnosed with cancer due to paraplegia when she was just 14 years old. Initially she took the sport of table tennis during her childhood age before becoming a professional wheelchair tennis player. At the age of 20, she made her Paralympic debut during the 1984 Summer Paralympics and competed in the table tennis events.

== Career ==
Monique Kalkman clinched a gold and a bronze medal in the women's table tennis competitions as a part of the 1984 Summer Paralympics. She then competed at the 1988 Summer Paralympics as a wheelchair tennis player and claimed a silver medal in the women's singles though the event was a demonstration sport at the 1988 Summer Paralympics. Monique Van den Bosch continued her medal hunt at the Summer Paralympics as she claimed gold medals in the women's singles and women's doubles partnering with Chantal Vandierendonck at the 1992 Summer Paralympics.

She also won the ITF World Titles in 1992, 1993, 1994 and 1995.

== Post career ==
In 1997, she was advised by the doctors to play golf as she had paraplegia disease. She retired from playing wheelchair tennis championships in 1997 and started to play golf during her leisure times. She also founded the Going4Golf, a golf foundation which aims to promote the golf sport for people with disabilities.
