= United States at the 1996 Summer Paralympics =

- Flag of the United States
- IPC code: USA
- NPC: United States Paralympic Committee
- Website: www.teamusa.org/US-Paralympics

in Atlanta
- Medals Ranked 1st: Gold 46 Silver 46 Bronze 65 Total 157

Summer Paralympics appearances (overview)
- 1960; 1964; 1968; 1972; 1976; 1980; 1984; 1988; 1992; 1996; 2000; 2004; 2008; 2012; 2016; 2020; 2024

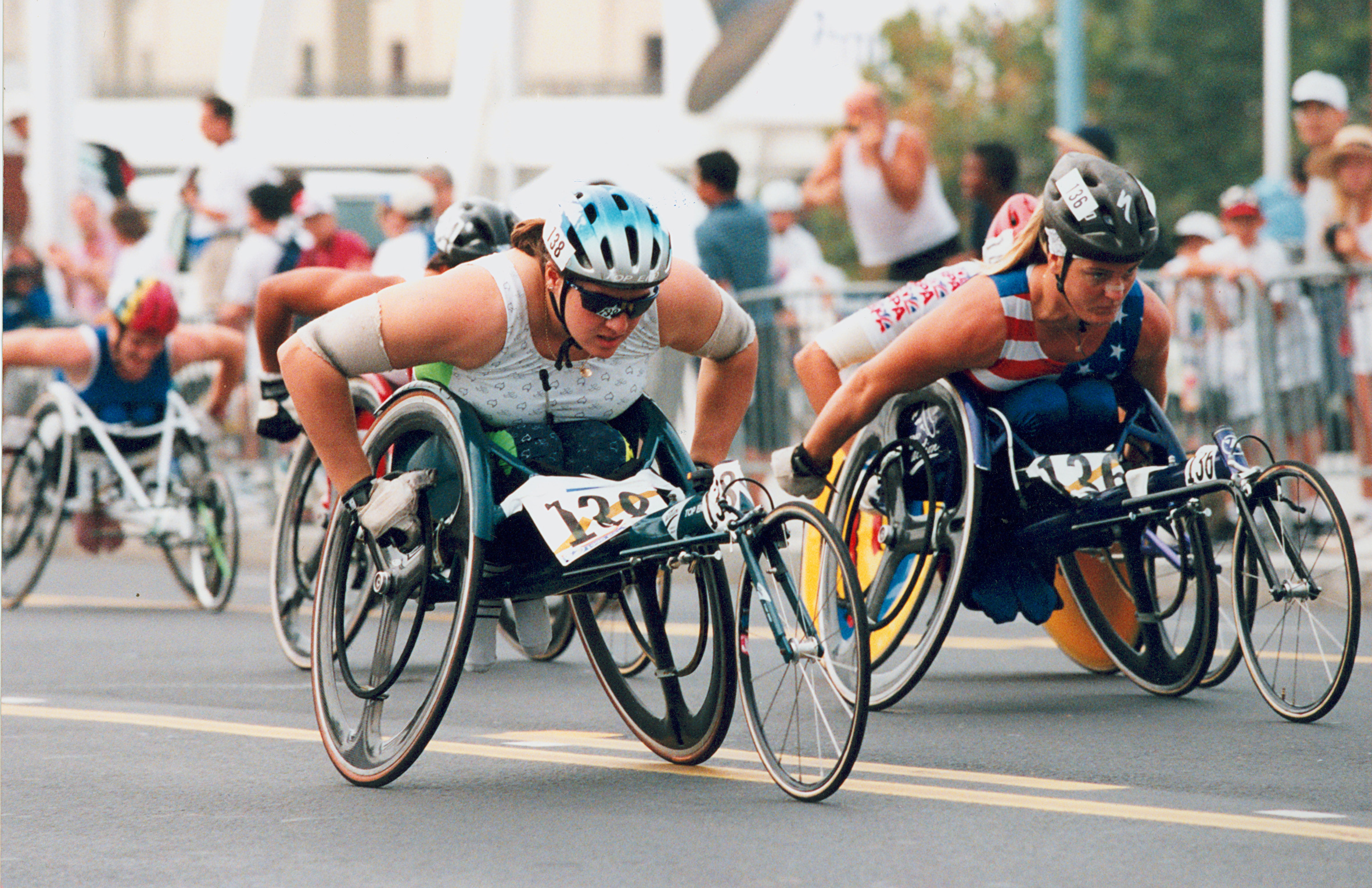
Australian and American athletes at the 1996 Summer Paralympics.

The United States was the host nation for the 1996 Summer Paralympics in Atlanta, Georgia. Its athletes finished first in the gold and overall medal count.

== Medalists ==
The following American athletes won medals at the games.

Medal	Name	Sport	Event
Gold	Arnold Astrada	Athletics	Men's Shot Put F54
Gold	Jennifer Barrett	Athletics	Women's Discus F42-44/46
Gold	Shawn Brown	Athletics	Men's Discus F43-44
Gold	Ross Davis	Athletics	Men's 100 m T33
Gold	Jean Driscoll	Athletics	Women's 10,000 m T52-53
Gold	Jean Driscoll	Athletics	Women's Marathon T52-53
Gold	Larry Hughes	Athletics	Men's Discus F56
Gold	Ellen Hyman	Athletics	Women's Discus F34-35
Gold	David Larson	Athletics	Men's 400 m T32-33
Gold	Linda Mastandrea	Athletics	Women's 200 m T32-33
Gold	Shawn Meredith	Athletics	Men's 400 m T51
Gold	Shawn Meredith	Athletics	Men's 800 m T51
Gold	Paul Nitz	Athletics	Men's 100 m T51
Gold	Joseph Parker	Athletics	Men's 5,000 m T34-37
Gold	Joseph Parker	Athletics	Men's 800 m T34-36
Gold	Freeman Register	Athletics	Men's 200 m T34-35
Gold	Marla Runyan	Athletics	Women's Pentathlon P10-12
Gold	LeAnn Shannon	Athletics	Women's 100 m T52
Gold	LeAnn Shannon	Athletics	Women's 200 m T52
Gold	LeAnn Shannon	Athletics	Women's 400 m T52
Gold	Tony Volpentest	Athletics	Men's 100 m T43-44
Gold	Tony Volpentest	Athletics	Men's 200 m T43-44
Gold	Daniel Nicholson	Cycling	Mixed 20k Bicycle CP Div 3
Gold	Dory Selinger	Cycling	Mixed Omnium LC2
Gold	Vicki Sweigart	Equestrian	Mixed Dressage grade II
Gold	Vicki Sweigart	Equestrian	Mixed Kur Trot grade II
Gold	Kim Brownfield	Powerlifting	Men's Over 100 kg
Gold	Luis Alicea	Swimming	Men's 100 m Freestyle S9
Gold	Daniel Butler	Swimming	Men's 50 m Butterfly S5
Gold	Daniel Kelly	Swimming	Men's 100 m Backstroke B1
Gold	Daniel Kelly	Swimming	Men's 200 m Medley B1
Gold	Joyce Luncher	Swimming	Women's 100 m Butterfly S9
Gold	Joyce Luncher	Swimming	Women's 100 m Freestyle S9
Gold	Joyce Luncher	Swimming	Women's 50 m Freestyle S9
Gold	Elizabeth Scott	Swimming	Women's 100 m Butterfly B3
Gold	James Thompson	Swimming	Men's 50 m Breaststroke SB2
Gold	Camille Waddell	Swimming	Women's 100 m Breaststroke SB5
Gold	Jason Wening	Swimming	Men's 400 m Freestyle S8
Gold	Trischa Zorn	Swimming	Women's 100 m Backstroke B2
Gold	Trischa Zorn	Swimming	Women's 200 m Medley B2
Gold	Gregory Burns; Daniel Butler; Martin Parker; Aaron Paulson; James Thompson	Swimming	Men's 4x50 m Freestyle S1-6
Gold	Gregory Burns; Daniel Butler; Martin Parker; Aaron Paulson	Swimming	Men's 4x50 m Medley S1-6
Gold	Karen Norris; Diane Straub; Joyce Luncher; Allison Pittman	Swimming	Women's 4 × 100 m Medley S7-10
Gold	Jennifer Johnson	Table tennis	Women's Singles 4
Gold	Tahl Leibovitz	Table tennis	Men's Singles 7
Gold	United States national wheelchair rugby team David Ceruti; Clifton Chunn; Charles Crouch; David Gould; William Renje; Joseph Soares; Bradley Updegrove	Wheelchair rugby	Mixed competition
Gold	Vance Parmelly; Stephen Welch	Wheelchair tennis	Men's Doubles
Silver	Robert Balk	Athletics	Men's Javelin F55
Silver	Robert Balk	Athletics	Men's Pentathlon P53-57
Silver	Cheri Becerra-Madsen	Athletics	Women's 100 m T53
Silver	Cheri Becerra-Madsen	Athletics	Women's 200 m T53
Silver	Thomas Bourgeois	Athletics	Men's Pentathlon P44
Silver	Tico Clawson	Athletics	Men's 200 m MH
Silver	Bart Dodson	Athletics	Men's Marathon T50
Silver	Jean Driscoll	Athletics	Women's 5,000 m T52-53
Silver	Marc Fenn	Athletics	Men's Discus F54
Silver	Douglas Heir	Athletics	Men's Shot Put F51
Silver	Scot Hollonbeck	Athletics	Men's 1,500 m T52-53
Silver	Scot Hollonbeck	Athletics	Men's 800 m T53
Silver	Denton Johnson	Athletics	Men's Discus F34/37
Silver	Linda Mastandrea	Athletics	Women's 100 m T32-33
Silver	Shawn Meredith	Athletics	Men's 200 m T51
Silver	Marla Runyan	Athletics	Women's Shot Put F12T34-37
Silver	Laura Schwanger	Athletics	Women's Discus F53-54
Silver	Laura Schwanger	Athletics	Women's Javelin F53-54
Silver	Laura Schwanger	Athletics	Women's Shot Put F53-54
Silver	Lincoln Scott	Athletics	Men's 100 m T37
Silver	Leann Shannon	Athletics	Women's 800 m T52
Silver	Jean Waters	Athletics	Women's 400 m T51
Silver	Henry Willis	Athletics	Men's 10,000 m T10
Silver	Lincoln Scott; Jason Tercey; Freeman Register; Ryan Blankenship	Athletics	Men's 4 × 100 m Relay T34-37
Silver	Daniel Nicholson	Cycling	Mixed 5,000 m Time Trial Bicycle CP Div 3
Silver	Rex Patrick	Cycling	Mixed Omnium LC3
Silver	Julia Haft; Tiffany Tretschiok	Cycling	Women's 50/60k Tandem open
Silver	Cara Dunne; Scott Evans	Cycling	Mixed Kilo Tandem open
Silver	Michael Hopper; Kathleen Urschel	Cycling	Mixed Individual Pursuit Tandem open
Silver	Kevin Szott	Judo	Men's Over 95 kg
Silver	Luis Alicea	Swimming	Men's 400 m Freestyle S9
Silver	Gregory Burns	Swimming	Men's 100 m Backstroke S6
Silver	Daniel Kelly	Swimming	Men's 100 m Breaststroke B1
Silver	Daniel Kelly	Swimming	Men's 100 m Freestyle B1
Silver	Joyce Luncher	Swimming	Women's 100 m Breaststroke SB9
Silver	Joyce Luncher	Swimming	Women's 200 m Medley SM9
Silver	Karen Norris	Swimming	Women's 100 m Backstroke S10
Silver	Julie Wolfe	Swimming	Women's 400 m Freestyle S7
Silver	Trischa Zorn	Swimming	Women's 400 m Freestyle B2
Silver	Trischa Zorn	Swimming	Women's 50 m Freestyle B2
Silver	Stephanie Brooks; Jill Nelson; Camille Waddell; Susan Moucha	Swimming	Women's 4x50 m Medley S1-6
Silver	Mandy Sommer; Elizabeth Scott; Katie Edgar; Trischa Zorn	Swimming	Women's 4 × 100 m Medley B1-3
Silver	Joyce Luncher; Allison Pittman; Karen Norris; Brenda Levy	Swimming	Women's 4 × 100 m Freestyle S7-10
Silver	Mitchell Seidenfeld	Table tennis	Men's Singles 8
Silver	Hope Lewellen; Nancy Olson	Wheelchair tennis	Women's Doubles
Silver	Stephen Welch	Wheelchair tennis	Men's Singles
Bronze	Jennifer Barrett	Athletics	Women's Shot Put F42-44/46
Bronze	Cheri Becerra-Madsen	Athletics	Women's 400 m T53
Bronze	Cheri Becerra-Madsen	Athletics	Women's 800 m T53
Bronze	Douglas Collier	Athletics	Men's Pentathlon P44
Bronze	Patrick Cottini	Athletics	Men's 5,000 m T51
Bronze	Patrick Cottini	Athletics	Men's Marathon T51
Bronze	Ross Davis	Athletics	Men's 400 m T32-33
Bronze	Jerry Deets	Athletics	Men's Pentathlon P53-57
Bronze	Jerry Deets	Athletics	Men's Shot Put F53
Bronze	Gabriel Diaz de Leon	Athletics	Men's Discus F52
Bronze	Bart Dodson	Athletics	Men's 800 m T50
Bronze	Jean Driscoll	Athletics	Women's 1,500 m T52-53
Bronze	Wardell Gadson	Athletics	Men's Long Jump MH
Bronze	Douglas Heir	Athletics	Men's Discus F51
Bronze	Douglas Heir	Athletics	Men's Javelin F51
Bronze	Asa Ison	Athletics	Men's Shot Put F43-44
Bronze	David Larson	Athletics	Men's 100 m T33
Bronze	Arthur Lewis	Athletics	Men's 200 m T12
Bronze	Aaron Little	Athletics	Men's Club Throw F50
Bronze	Sheila O'Neil	Athletics	Women's 100 m T32-33
Bronze	Matthew Parry	Athletics	Men's 100 m T52
Bronze	Bradley Ramage	Athletics	Men's 200 m T51
Bronze	Freeman Register	Athletics	Men's 100 m T35
Bronze	Richard Ruffalo	Athletics	Men's Javelin F10
Bronze	Todd Schaffhauser	Athletics	Men's 100 m T42
Bronze	Deanna Sodoma	Athletics	Women's Marathon T52-53
Bronze	Ann Walters	Athletics	Women's 800 m T52
Bronze	Henry Willis	Athletics	Men's 1,500 m T10
Bronze	Henry Willis	Athletics	Men's 5,000 m T10
Bronze	Winford Haynes; Andre Asbury; Marvin Campbell; Arthur Lewis	Athletics	Men's 4 × 100 m Relay T10-12
Bronze	Matthew Bulow; Thomas Bourgeois; Dennis Oehler; Douglas Collier	Athletics	Men's 4 × 100 m Relay T42-46
Bronze	Edward Munro; Kelvin Hogans; Winford Haynes; Craig Mallinckrodt	Athletics	Men's 4 × 400 m Relay T10-12
Bronze	Steven Thompson	Boccia	Mixed Individual C1
Bronze	Corey Huntley	Cycling	Mixed 5,000 m Time Trial Tricycle CP Div 2
Bronze	Lawrence Schultz	Cycling	Mixed 20k Bicycle CP Div 4
Bronze	Lawrence Schultz	Cycling	Mixed 5,000 m Time Trial Bicycle CP Div 4
Bronze	Juila Haft; Tiffany Tretschiok	Cycling	Women's Individual Pursuit Tandem open
Bronze	Pamala Fernandes; Michael Rosenberg	Cycling	Mixed Kilo Tandem open
Bronze	Cara Dunne; Scott Evans	Cycling	Mixed 200 m Sprint Tandem open
Bronze	Lauren McDevitt	Equestrian	Mixed Dressage grade II
Bronze	United States women's national goalball team Jennifer Armbruster; Maureen Esposito; Margaret Ostrowski; Sheryl Gordon; Patti Egensteiner-Asbury; Irene Davis-Sparks	Goalball	Women's competition
Bronze	Marlon Lopez	Judo	Men's Up To 65 kg
Bronze	James Mastro	Judo	Men's Up To 95 kg
Bronze	Stephan Moore	Judo	Men's Up To 71 kg
Bronze	Pernell Cooper	Powerlifting	Men's Over 100 kg
Bronze	Luis Alicea	Swimming	Men's 50 m Freestyle S9
Bronze	Aimee Bruder	Swimming	Women's 100 m Freestyle S4
Bronze	Aimee Bruder	Swimming	Women's 200 m Freestyle S4
Bronze	Daniel Kelly	Swimming	Men's 100 m Butterfly B2
Bronze	Daniel Kelly	Swimming	Men's 50 m Freestyle B1
Bronze	Craig Laufenberg	Swimming	Men's 50 m Backstroke S4
Bronze	Brenda Levy	Swimming	Women's 50 m Freestyle S8
Bronze	Aaron Paulson	Swimming	Men's 100 m Breaststroke SB5
Bronze	Elizabeth Scott	Swimming	Women's 100 m Backstroke B3
Bronze	Elizabeth Scott	Swimming	Women's 100 m Breaststroke B3
Bronze	Elizabeth Scott	Swimming	Women's 200 m Medley B3
Bronze	James Thompson	Swimming	Men's 200 m Freestyle S4
Bronze	Trischa Zorn	Swimming	Women's 100 m Breaststroke B2
Bronze	Trischa Zorn	Swimming	Women's 100 m Freestyle B2
Bronze	Camille Waddell; Sandra Hanebrink; Aimee Bruder; Stephanie Brooks	Swimming	Women's 4x50 m Freestyle S1-6
Bronze	Elizabeth Scott; Dawn Duffy; Mandy Sommer; Trischa Zorn	Swimming	Women's 4 × 100 m Freestyle B1-3
Bronze	Jennifer Johnson; Jacqueline di Lorenzo; Terese Terranova	Table tennis	Women's Teams 3-5
Bronze	Tahl Leibovitz; Mitchell Seidenfeld	Table tennis	Men's Teams 6-8
Bronze	United States men's national wheelchair basketball team: Reginald Colton; Chuck Gill; Trooper Johnson; Melvin Sean Juette; Timothy Kazee; Roberto Knight; James Miller; Mike Schlappi; Mark Shepherd; Craig Shewmake; Randy Snow; Darryl Waller	Wheelchair basketball	Men's competition
Bronze	United States women's national wheelchair basketball team: Jamie Danskin; Pamela Fontaine; Susan Hagel; Sharon Herbst; Ronda Jarvis; Josie Johnson; Kimberly Martin; Ruth Nunez; Margaret Stran; Jana Stump; Tiana Tozer; Renee Tyree-Gross	Wheelchair basketball	Women's competition

== See also ==
- 1996 Summer Paralympics
- United States at the 1996 Summer Olympics
