= Chantal Vandierendonck =

Dutch wheelchair tennis player

- Born: January 31, 1965 (age 61) Netherlands
- Int. Tennis HoF: 2014 (member page)

Singles
- Career record: 175-39
- Masters: W (1996)

Doubles
- Career record: 79-12
Medal record
Wheelchair tennis
Representing Netherlands
Paralympic Games
Gold medal – first place	1988 Seoul	Women's Singles
Gold medal – first place	1992 Barcelona	Women's Doubles
Gold medal – first place	1996 Atlanta	Women's Doubles
Silver medal – second place	1992 Barcelona	Women's Singles
Bronze medal – third place	1996 Atlanta	Women's Singles

Chantal Vandierendonck (born 31 January 1965) is a Dutch former professional wheelchair tennis player. Vandierendonck won various wheelchair tennis championships held by the International Tennis Federation and multiple Paralympic medals from 1988 to 1996. She was inducted into the International Tennis Hall of Fame in 2014.

== Early life ==
Vandierendonck was born on 31 January 1965 in the Netherlands. She became a paraplegic after a car accident when she was eighteen.

== Career ==
After meeting wheelchair tennis player Jean-Pierre Limborg in Paris, Vandierendonck began her tennis career at a French competition in 1983. In 1985, she won her first out of seven Super Series U.S. Open championships with her last win in 1993. Alternatively, Vandierendonck participated in the first team event at the ITF Wheelchair Tennis Tour in 1996 and co-won the ITF's women's doubles cup in 1997. During her time at the ITF in the 1990s, she was named ITF World Champion three times and won the Wheelchair Tennis Masters in 1996.

Outside of the ITF, Vandierendonck competed at the Paralympic Games for wheelchair tennis in both singles and doubles. Her first Paralympic medal was at the demonstration of wheelchair tennis at the 1988 Summer Paralympics. She won additional Paralympic medals at the 1992 Summer Paralympics and 1996 Summer Paralympics.

== Awards and honours ==
In 2010, Vandierendonck was given the Brad Parks Award. After her nomination to the International Tennis Hall of Fame in 2013, Vandierendonck was inducted into the ITHF in 2014 as the first inductee in wheelchair tennis. She joined the Wheelchair Tennis Hall of Champions in 2026 for the International Tennis Federation.
