= Regina Isecke =

German wheelchair tennis player

- Country (sports): Germany
- Born: 5 January 1953; Pulheim, West Germany
- Died: 26 June 2015 (aged 62); Lohmar, Germany
- Turned pro: 1991
- Retired: 2002

Singles
- Highest ranking: No. 3 (26 January 1993)

Other tournaments
- Paralympic Games: SF – 3rd (1992)
Medal record
Summer Paralympic Games
Bronze medal – third place	1992 Barcelona	Singles

Regina Isecke (5 January 1953 – 26 June 2015) was a German wheelchair tennis player who competed in international level events. She was known as a pioneer in wheelchair tennis in Germany and was the German Wheelchair Tennis Association's president for many years until her death.

Isecke was involved in an accident in 1971 resulting in a spinal cord injury and paraplegia, she was previously a wheelchair basketball player and a para table tennis player before switching to wheelchair tennis.

A street in Junkersdorf, Cologne is named after her, Regina-Isecke-Straße, in 2018.
