= Lynn Seidemann =

American wheelchair tennis player

Personal information
- Born: 19 November 1963 (age 62) Coppell, Texas, United States

Sport
- Country: United States
- Sport: Wheelchair tennis, para equestrianism
- Disability: Paraplegia
Medal record
Wheelchair tennis
Representing United States
Paralympic Games
Silver medal – second place	1992 Barcelona	Women's doubles
Para equestrianism
Paralympic Games
Silver medal – second place	2004 Athens	Individual freestyle I
World Para Equestrian Championships
Gold medal – first place	2003 Moorsele	Individual dressage I
Silver medal – second place	2003 Moorsele	Individual freestyle I

Lynn Seidemann (born November 19, 1963) is a former American wheelchair tennis player and dressage rider. She became a paraplegic after a skiing accident in 1983.
