= France at the 1992 Summer Paralympics =

- IPC code: FRA
- NPC: French Paralympic and Sports Committee
- Website: france-paralympique.fr

in Barcelona
- Competitors: 145
- Medals Ranked 4th: Gold 36 Silver 36 Bronze 35 Total 107

Summer Paralympics appearances (overview)
- 1960; 1964; 1968; 1972; 1976; 1980; 1984; 1988; 1992; 1996; 2000; 2004; 2008; 2012; 2016; 2020; 2024

France competed at the 1992 Summer Paralympics in Barcelona, Spain. 145 competitors from France won 106 medals, 36 gold, 36 silver and 34 bronze and finished 4th in the medal table.

== See also ==
- France at the Paralympics
- France at the 1992 Summer Olympics
