= Netherlands at the 1992 Summer Paralympics =

- Flag of the Netherlands
- IPC code: NED
- NPC: Nederlands Olympisch Comité * Nederlandse Sport Federatie
- Website: paralympisch.nl (in Dutch)

in Barcelona
- Competitors: 99 (72 men and 27 women)
- Medals Ranked 11th: Gold 14 Silver 14 Bronze 12 Total 40

Summer Paralympics appearances (overview)
- 1960; 1964; 1968; 1972; 1976; 1980; 1984; 1988; 1992; 1996; 2000; 2004; 2008; 2012; 2016; 2020; 2024

Netherlands competed at the 1992 Summer Paralympics in Barcelona, Spain. The team included 99 athletes, 72 men and 27 women. Competitors from Netherlands won 39 medals, including 14 gold, 14 silver and 11 bronze to finish 9th in the medal table.

In The Madrid games Paralympics Netherlands has 1 bronze medal.

== See also ==
- Netherlands at the Paralympics
- Netherlands at the 1992 Summer Olympics
