= Hope Lewellen =

American wheelchair tennis and sitting volleyball player (born 1967)

Personal information
- Born: April 20, 1967 (age 59); Palos Park, Illinois, U.S.
Medal record
Representing United States
Paralympic Games
Women's wheelchair tennis
Silver medal – second place	1996 Atlanta	Doubles
Women's sitting volleyball
Bronze medal – third place	2004 Athens	Team
Silver medal – second place	2008 Beijing	Team
WOVD Intercontinental Cup
Bronze medal – third place	2008 Ismaïlia, Egypt	Team

Hope Lewellen (born April 20, 1967) is an American wheelchair tennis and sitting volleyball player.

== Biography ==
Lewellen was born in Palos Park, Illinois. In 1996 she won her first medal which was silver for her participation in wheelchair tennis at Paralympic Games, Atlanta, Georgia. Four years, in Sydney, Australia she became quarterfinalist in the same sport. In 2004, she won a bronze medal in Paralympic Games in Athens, Greece. Four years later she was awarded another bronze medal, this time for her participation in World Organization Volleyball for Disabled Intercontinental Cup in Ismaïlia, Egypt. The same year she won a silver medal in Women's Sitting Volleyball at the 2008 Summer Paralympics in Beijing, China.
