= Oristelle Marx =

French wheelchair tennis player

Personal information
- Born: 7 July 1971 (age 54)

Sport
- Country: France
- Sport: Wheelchair tennis
- Disability: Paraplegia
Medal record
Wheelchair tennis
Representing France
Paralympic Games
Bronze medal – third place	1992 Barcelona	Women's doubles
Bronze medal – third place	1996 Atlanta	Women's doubles

Oristelle Marx (born 7 July 1971) is a former French wheelchair tennis player, she is a right-handed player. She competed in two Paralympic Games and won two bronze medals in the doubles' events with Arlette Racineux.

In 1986, Marx was involved in an accident in a gymnastics training centre which resulted in her paraplegia. She now works as a consultant trainer for disability awareness.
