= Arlette Racineux =

French wheelchair tennis player

- Country (sports): France
- Residence: Saint-Herblain, France
- Born: 2 March 1961 (age 64) Saint-Nazaire, France
Medal record
Women's wheelchair tennis
Representing France
Paralympic Games
Bronze medal – third place	1996 Atlanta	Women's doubles
Bronze medal – third place	2008 Beijing	Women's doubles

Arlette Racineux (born 2 March 1961) is a French wheelchair tennis player, she plays left-handed. Racineux is a two time bronze medalist in the Summer Paralympics; she won her first bronze medal in 1996 with Oristelle Marx and won her second bronze medal with Florence Gravellier.
