= 1992 Summer Paralympics =

Multi-parasport event in Spain

IX Paralympic Games
- Location: Barcelona and Madrid, Spain
- Motto: Sport Without Limits (Catalan: Esport Sense Límits) (Spanish: Deporte Sin Límites)
- Nations: 82 (BCN); 75 (MAD)
- Athletes: 2,999 (BCN); ~1,600 (MAD)
- Events: 487 in 15 sports (BCN); 68 in 5 sports (MAD)
- Opening: 3 September 1992 (BCN); 15 September 1992 (MAD)
- Closing: 14 September 1992 (BCN); 22 September 1992 (MAD)
- Opened by: Queen Sofía
- Cauldron: Antonio Rebollo (BCN); Coral Bistuer (MAD)
- Stadium: Estadi Olímpic de Montjuïc (BCN); Palacio de Deportes de la Comunidad de Madrid (MAD)

The 1992 Summer Paralympics (Spanish: Juegos Paralímpicos de Verano de 1992; Catalan: Jocs Paralímpics d'estiu de 1992) were the ninth Paralympic Games to be held. They were held in Barcelona, Catalonia, Spain. In addition, the 1992 Paralympic Games for Persons with mental handicap were held immediately after the regular Paralympics in the Spanish capital, Madrid.

== Host city selection ==
Barcelona is the second-largest city in Spain and the capital of the autonomous community of Catalonia, and the hometown of then-IOC president Juan Antonio Samaranch and the famous European club, FC Barcelona that from the beginning of the candidacy provided support and financially helped the project. The city was also a host for the 1982 FIFA World Cup with two venues who were also used during the games. On 17 October 1986, Barcelona was selected to host the 1992 Summer Olympics over Amsterdam, Netherlands; Belgrade, Yugoslavia; Birmingham, United Kingdom; Brisbane, Australia; and Paris, France, during the 91st IOC Session in Lausanne, Switzerland. With 85 out of 89 members of the IOC voting by secret ballot, Barcelona won a majority of 47 votes. Samaranch abstained from voting. In the same IOC meeting, Albertville, France, won the right to host the 1992 Winter Games. Paris and Brisbane would eventually be selected to host the 2024 and 2032 Summer Paralympics respectively.

Barcelona had previously bid for the 1936 Summer Olympics that were ultimately held in Berlin.

1992 Summer Olympics bidding results
City	NOC Name	Round 1	Round 2	Round 3	Round 4	Round 5	Round 6
Barcelona	Spain	29	37	47	57	67	85
Paris	France	19	20	23	18	18	-
Brisbane	Australia	11	9	10	10	-	-
Belgrade	Yugoslavia	13	11	5	-	-	-
Birmingham	Great Britain	8	8	—	-	-	-
Amsterdam	Netherlands	5	—	—	-	-	-

=== Paralympic Context and the 1980s crisis ===
The allocation of the Paralympic Games to Barcelona was initiated through a direct proposal by Juan Antonio Samaranch. During the mid-1980s, the global Paralympic movement faced a significant institutional crisis, as recent Olympic host cities had repeatedly declined to stage the adapted competitions—such as Moscow in 1980 and Los Angeles in 1984—forcing the Paralympics to be fragmented or exiled to alternative venues due to a persistent lack of funding and political interest. Recognizing that this ongoing segregation threatened the survival of the adapted sports movement, Samaranch designated his home city of Barcelona as the primary environment to establish a new organizational blueprint. He leveraged his position as IOC President to persuade local officials, including Mayor Pasqual Maragall, to absorb the Paralympics into the main Olympic framework, utilizing Barcelona's large-scale urban transformation to prove that a unified administrative system could secure the long-term financial and logistical viability of the Games.Consequently, during the Olympic bidding process, Barcelona demonstrated strong motivation to host the Paralympic Games and, unlike previous host cities, the bidding committee established positive relations with the International Coordinating Committee (ICC). Shortly after Barcelona was selected as the host city in October 1986, formal negotiations with the ICC began under the direct mediation of Samaranch. Barcelona presented an unprecedented model in which the Olympic and Paralympic Games would be managed, planned, and executed by a single organizational body. Unlike the subsequent 1988 Summer Paralympics in Seoul—where logistics were improved but administrative structures remained separate—the Barcelona blueprint ensured that Paralympic athletes were provided with the exact same conditions as Olympic participants. This integrated approach guaranteed that Paralympic competitors would use the same planned sports venues, which incorporated the accessibility standards of the time, and receive equal access to the main Olympic Village and its core organizational services.

==== The innovative measures ====
On April 14, 1987, during an extraordinary meeting, the General Assembly of the Barcelona 1992 Olympic Organizing Committee (COOB'92) formally approved the assumption of responsibility for organizing and integrating the Paralympic Games under the same administrative structure as the Olympic Games. On that occasion, the committee convened its members to conduct a detailed assessment of the technical and financial feasibility of taking on the organization of the Paralympics. During the discussions, officials formally approved the decision that the same administrative structure responsible for the Olympic Games would also undertake the organization of the Paralympic Games.

==== The Political Influence of Samaranch ====
This decision was no mere coincidence; rather, it was the result of a combination of political maneuvering, a vision for excellence, and logistical intelligence. First and foremost, the political mediation of Juan Antonio Samaranch—then president of the International Olympic Committee (IOC)—served as the primary driving force behind this initiative. As a native of the host city,him personally ordered and pushed for the creation of the Spanish Sports Federation for the Physically Disabled (FEDDF) in 1968 , formally introducing organized parasports to the nation.Samaranch leveraged his influence to encourage the local organizing committee to adopt a revolutionary model that integrated the two competitions, thereby establishing a new global benchmark for adapted sports.The idea emerged from a complex situation: having witnessed firsthand how recent Olympic host cities had refused to stage the Paralympic Games—compounded by a persistent lack of funding for such events—Samaranch used Barcelona as a major laboratory for developing solutions. He and the then-Barcelona mayor, Pasqual Maragall, consolidated the administration to ensure that the Paralympic Games would never again be cancelled or cast aside by an Olympic committee, which historically resulted in a different host city. In doing so, they established the standard of excellence that exists today.This also involved a complex persuasion process with the International Coordinating Committee (ICC), the governing body for global adapted sports at the time. Initially, the ICC showed extreme distrust and reluctance to relinquish its organizational independence. Meanwhile, Seoul was already preparing to host the Games the following year under unprecedented circumstances. For the first time in 24 years (since Tokyo 1964), the Paralympics were set to be held once again in the same host city.Still, while Seoul represented a step forward, the promise made in 1984—that identical conditions would be provided—had been broken regarding accessibility. This failure resulted in only some of the Olympic facilities being shared, as well as the necessity of constructing a separate, second village specifically for the Paralympic Games. With Samaranch's direct support, the Olympics Organizing Committee (SLOOC) provided human resources, volunteers, security, and logistics to support for the Paralympics Organizing Committee (SEPOC).However, the structure in Seoul still possessed a crucial gap that Barcelona sought to address: the organizing committees for the two events in Seoul remained entirely separate entities, maintaining only a tangential relationship. There was a persistent fear that, without a definitive institutional merger, future Olympic host cities might simply refuse or neglect the Paralympic Games, thereby breaking the fragile mechanism that had just begun to take hold.The negotiation was led directly by Samaranch and the Spanish committee, who presented an irrefutable technical and financial argument to the ICC: in exchange for administrative unification, the ICC would receive the largest budget in Paralympic history, unrestricted use of all Olympic venues, and the exact same high-standard accommodation conditions and services within the main Olympic Village. Faced with these guarantees of excellence, the ICC accepted the proposal and yielded its operational rights, delegating all technical and commercial execution to the Barcelona committee.

==== Negotiations and institutional tensions with the ICC ====
The unification process involved prolonged and delicate negotiations with the International Coordinating Committee (ICC), the global governing body for adapted sports at the time. Although the COOB'92 General Assembly approved the integration framework in April 1987, the signing of the formal contract was delayed for over two years due to mutual institutional resistance. Initially, the ICC demonstrated extreme distrust and reluctance to relinquish its organizational independence, fearing that integrating with a traditional Olympic committee would could result in lose their distinct identity or be marginalized in favor of mainstream Olympic commercial interests. Concurrently, some domestic factions within the Spanish organizing committee expressed concerns regarding the added financial liabilities and operational risks of managing a second major event. These impasses were resolved through the direct mediation of Juan Antonio Samaranch and the Spanish committee, who leveraged the political weight of the IOC to present an irrefutable technical and financial argument. In exchange for administrative unification, the ICC was promised unprecedented concessions: the largest budget in Paralympic history up to that point, unrestricted use of all main Olympic venues, and the exact same high-standard accommodation conditions and services within the core Olympic Village. Faced with these guarantees of excellence, the ICC officially signed the host city contract on July 20, 1989, yielding its operational, technical, and commercial rights, and delegating all execution to the Barcelona committee. This intense transitional friction ultimately contributed to the restructuring of global parasports governance, culminating in the dissolution of the ICC in 1993 and the permanent transfer of authority to the newly established International Paralympic Committee (IPC).

After the host city contract signature,the common directives established by COOB'92 enforced equal operational conditions for both Olympic and Paralympic athletes, generating a new template for physical and structural integration. This approach encompassed a unified visual identity, shared corporate marketing and sponsorship programs, the use of the same competition venues with minor technical adaptations, and housing within the same athletes' village with access to identical services. For the first time, a Paralympic educational program was implemented and managed under the same operational standards as its Olympic equivalent.Despite the unified vision, the implementation of this "compact model" generated significant technical disputes and logistical strain among engineers, urban planners, and sports officials:

- Operational Scale and Athlete Limits: Early in the planning phases, engineering sectors within COOB'92 expressed concerns that a massive influx of Paralympic competitors would overwhelm Barcelona's compact urban layout and modified arenas. To mitigate the risk of gridlock across housing and transport networks, organizers imposed stricter elite qualifying standards, intentionally capping the final number of athletes to prioritize high-performance sports over mass participation.This ultimately forced the creation of a new functional classification system, which serves as the basis for the one currently used in IPC competitions.
- Conversion Timelines: Unlike the 1988 Seoul games, which had relied on separate or exclusive facilities or newly built alternative villages to manage accessibility, Barcelona committed to reusing the exact same venues. This choice created strict operational windows. Civil engineers faced significant schedule pressures to complete major physical conversions—such as installing expansive modular ramps, modifying locker rooms, and updating plumbing fixtures—in the brief interval between the closing of the Olympics and the opening of the Paralympics.
- Olympic Village Adaptations: The decision to house the two group of athletes in the same high-standard Olympic Village also faced criticism. Adapted sports representatives initially challenged the residential blueprints, arguing that the apartment layouts and elevator capacities (originally drafted under the broad baselines of the 1982 LISMI act) would cause major mobility bottlenecks for wheelchair users moving concurrently, forcing late-stage engineering adjustments.
- Historic Urban Friction: While accessibility retrofits integrated smoothly into flatter, historic areas like the Eixample district, retrofitting the venues near Barcelona's historic quarters—such as the Barri Gòtic—provoked architectural debates. Planners clashed over how to level cobblestone streets and lower curbs without destroying archaeological heritage, creating localized disparities in the city's overall accessibility network.

From an economic perspective, the single-structure framework ultimately optimized the urban transformation already underway. Instead of investing in redundant, independent sports complexes for the Paralympics, the organizers updated existing arenas and integrated accessible public transportation systems, generating a long-term urban legacy while controlling expenses.

==== Strategic and Legal Frameworks ====
Furthermore, the leadership of COOB'92 argued that managing the Paralympics through a separate or outsourced administrative structure would jeopardize the quality and operational safety of the event. To ensure the execution of both Games, it was determined that the same specialized technical team should oversee operations from start to finish, scaled to the operational dimensions of the adapted competition.

From a logistical and financial perspective, this approach served a strategic purpose. The Barcelona Olympic blueprint relied heavily on optimizing existing urban transformations rather than constructing redundant sports complexes, fast-tracking a series of infrastructure projects aimed at improving long-term accessibility and quality of life for the local population. Since the host city was already undergoing a massive urban renewal—involving the modernization of existing areas and arenas, the development of new residential complexes, and the implementation of accessible transport systems—the committee utilized this identical infrastructure to accommodate both groups of athletes.

This process was largely driven by the broader political context of Spain's democratization, which facilitated the enactment of new laws regarding physical accessibility and structural transparency. The initial mandatory legal baseline for the project's engineering was dictated by the mandates of Ley 13/1982 de Integración Social de los Minusválidos (LISMI), which formally introduced the removal of architectural barriers into Spanish law and forced the inclusion of accessibility standards into the earliest urban blueprints for the Games. Building upon these principles and the regulatory frameworks that soon culminated in the passage of the Ley del Deporte of 1990 (the Spanish Sports Law, which restructured and unified the nation’s sports governance, clubs, and federations), the organizers sought to cement a permanent international legacy for adapted sports management.

==== Budget Crisis and the Participation of ONCE ====
Despite the initial planning for the 1992 Summer Olympic and Paralympic Games, organizers in Barcelona faced financial challenges that the Spanish government could not cover. The strictly sports-related budget for the Olympics saw a 266% increase in real terms compared to original estimates, as noted in economic studies from the University of Oxford. Massive investment in the transformation of urban infrastructure, combined with rising costs for public works, absorbed the bulk of available state resources. The direct impact on the planning for the Paralympics became clear in November 1988, shortly after the conclusion of the Seoul Games. Upon returning from South Korea, the Spanish technical delegation realized that the funds initially allocated would not cover even half of the actual costs required to meet physical accessibility goals—which included re-engineering ground-floor apartments in the Olympic Village and making topographical adjustments on Montjuïc Hill. Faced with an overall budget overrun, the Spanish government formally indicated that it would be unable to provide further public funding for the accessible-infrastructure component. The crisis intensified in May 1989, when the organizing committee received official warnings that the event’s total financial ceiling had been exceeded.

==== The 1989 Co-management Agreement ====
To make the Paralympic Games feasible without implementing structural cuts, the Barcelona Olympic Organizing Committee (COOB'92) sought to integrate private capital. In February 1989, the Spanish National Organization of the Blind (ONCE) signed a strategic cooperation agreement, acquiring a 50% stake in the COOB'92 Paralympic Department.Unlike a conventional commercial sponsorship, the agreement established an executive co-management model divided into four areas of operation:

- Direct budget management:ONCE assumed shared control of the funds allocated to the Paralympics, isolating the operational budget for the adapted sports sector from the deficits accumulated by the broader Olympic organization.
- Lottery-based financing: The organization restructured its national lottery products—most notably the "Cuponazo"—directing a portion of the proceeds straight into the cash flow for the event’s construction and operations.
- Oversight of accessible engineering: ONCE engineers and technicians were integrated directly into construction sites to plan and inspect physical accessibility standards within the Olympic Village and the sports arenas in Montjuïc.
- Media outreach and marketing: Leveraging its position as a co-owner of the private television network Telecinco (in which it held a stake until 1993), the organization launched public awareness campaigns and promoted adapted sports, which helped attract secondary sponsors and extended the then current contracts.

=== The Expansion of Functional Classification ===
The budget constrains led to also a structural change, as was the primary laboratory for one of the most significant technical revolutions in the history of adapted sports: the transition from a purely medical classification to a functional classification system. Up until then, athletes were grouped strictly based on isolated clinical and anatomical diagnoses (such as amputations, visual impairments, or spinal cord injuries). This traditional model failed to guarantee sporting fairness, as two athletes with the exact same level of anatomical injury could demonstrate completely different functional capabilities, muscle strength, and biomechanical balance due to individual training backgrounds or physiology. Furthermore, this classification scheme oversaturated the event schedule with dozens of redundant categories, causing a severe logistical and technical bottleneck by the late 1980s..

The modernization and universal expansion of the functional system were fundamentally driven by the severe budget constraints faced by the organizing committee in late 1988. Separating athletes strictly by medical micro-categories required a single swimming or track event to be repeated dozens of times, frequently resulting in hollow, unsustainable finals with lone competitors. For a committee severely restricted by a multi-billion-scale collapse of public funds, financing the logistical overhead of such an inflated calendar, specialized technical staff, and extra operational support—was financially impossible.To cut soaring operational costs, the newly established Paralympic Division utilized the functional methodology successfully tested during the 1984 Summer Paralympics in wheelchair basketball and expanded it into a mandatory, universal standard across all sports. Under this new coordination, the evaluation shifted to the actual impact a disability had on an athlete's sporting performance within each specific discipline. Medical experts and coaches began assessing biomechanical movement and practical functionality during the execution of athletic tasks, allowing different clinical profiles to compete against each other in the same event, provided they shared the same level of motor functionality. This resource-driven consolidation successfully streamlined arena logistics and reduced the total number of sports events. Beyond rescuing the event's cash flow, this integration transformed the Paralympics into a dynamic, high-performance elite sports product, significantly boosting competitiveness and creating the media appeal required to capture the commercial interest of television networks like Telecinco and RTVE.

==== Establishing a New Global Standard ====
The unification of the management structure in April 1987,also established an institutional and planing precedent that years later became a mandatory requirement for any city bidding to host the Olympic Games, formally solidified through the subsequent cooperative agreements between the IOC and the International Paralympic Committee (IPC). This integrated management framework ensured parity in the operational conditions provided to both Olympic and Paralympic participants, characterized by several key shared operational areas:

- Unified visual identity: Cohesive branding and design parameters implemented across both events.
- Shared marketing programs: Unified commercial initiatives, corporate sponsorships, and licensing programs managed under a single portfolio.
- Shared competition venues: The utilization of identical sporting arenas, requiring only minor technical and field-of-play variations between competitions.
- Shared accommodations: Housing within the exact same main athletes' village with access to identical services, dining facilities, and medical support.

These operational parameters also allowed for the implementation of a dedicated educational program for the Paralympic Games, managed under the same structural guidelines as its Olympic equivalent, which served to increase public literacy and engagement regarding adapted sports.

==== Commercial Nuances and Special Measures ====
While the COOB'92 was linked to the IOC regarding ticket sales,as happened in Seoul four years before, the ICC (International Coordinating Committee) showed no commercial interest in this, and the public was able to attend the Games at the venues virtually for free. Only tickets for the opening and closing ceremonies sold out within minutes.This decision—brokered once again by Samaranch—served as a catalyst for the International Paralympic Movement, as both athletes and future organizers were, from that point on, presented with a standard of excellence to be expected and upheld.The concept that initially seemed extremely risky in every way, proved enchanting when the Hellenic Olympic Committee authorized the special use of the Olympic flame during the Paralympic Games.

==== The Greek Concession and the Shared Use of the Olympic Flame ====
The universal integration strategy under COOB'92 culminated in an unprecedented institutional breakthrough regarding the traditional symbols of the Olympic Movement. Historically, the Hellenic Olympic Committee (HOC) and strict International Olympic Committee (IOC) mandates prohibited the use of the official flame lit in Olympia, Greece, for any competition outside the regular Olympic Games. However, the single-committee operational model and the heavy political intervention of IOC President Juan Antonio Samaranch pressured traditional bodies to rethink these boundaries. The global success and broadcast impact of Rebollo's flawless shot served as a powerful argument for the Paralympic Division. Under the unified management of the Barcelona Olympic Organising Committee (COOB'92), a fraction of the Olympic flame—which arrived in Spain in June—was discreetly kept lit in a safety lantern at the Barcelona City Hall (Ajuntament) after the conclusion of the Olympic Games. This bypassed the strict protocol of the Hellenic Olympic Committee, which historically prohibited the use of the Olympia flame for any events outside the Olympic Charter. On August 29, 1992, the flame was taken from the City Hall to begin a localized Paralympic torch relay across 30 districts of the Barcelona metropolitan area, culminating in the opening ceremony where Paralympic archer Antonio Rebollo once again lit the cauldron using a flaming arrow. .

=== Media Campaigns, Domestic Audience, and International Broadcasting ===
To secure public engagement and justify its massive capital injection, ONCE deployed an extensive multimedia promotional campaign closely tied to its national lottery network. Using its commercial leverage as a major shareholder in the private television network Telecinco, alongside state-backed promotional agreements with the public broadcaster Televisión Española (RTVE), ONCE transformed the social perception of adapted sports across Spain. This synchronized outreach directly translated into packed stadiums, drawing more than 2.3 million physical spectators throughout the 12-day competitive window.

For the first time in Paralympic history, the Games benefited from daily live domestic television coverage. The host broadcast operations were a collaborative effort, managed primarily by the Catalan public broadcaster Televisió de Catalunya (TV3) with lingering technical and production support from Radio y Televisión Olímpica de Barcelona (RTO'92). In Spain, the media strategy proved to be an unprecedented success, with the Opening Ceremony alone attracting a record-breaking domestic television audience of approximately 7 million viewers across RTVE and the autonomic networks.

While domestic engagement reached historic peaks, international television distribution remained localized and faced significant structural disparities. The live signal generated by TV3 and RTO'92 was successfully distributed across Europe, capturing a regional audience of approximately 1.5 million viewers. However, beyond the European continent, media coverage was severely limited. Broadcasters outside Europe did not offer continuous live feeds, relying instead on syndication or generating their own tape-delayed highlights. For example, in the United Kingdom, the British Broadcasting Corporation (BBC) opted against a live broadcast, confining its Paralympic coverage to brief daily highlight packages. This stark contrast between high European engagement and minimal global coverage underscored the contemporary limits of international parasports syndication, a barrier that remained until the widespread adoption of live global feeds at the Sydney 2000 Games.

==== Infrastructural Deadlines and Climatic Adjustments ====
The scheduling framework for the 1992 Games originally stipulated an interval between the closing of the Olympic Games on August 9 and the planned afternoon opening of the Paralympic Games on September 2. Rather than a mere recess, this transition phase served as a critical operational timeline required by the single-committee "compact model." Following the departure of approximately 10,000 Olympic participants, organizers utilized the period to clean, restock, and complete specialized retrofits within the main Olympic Village for the incoming 3,000 Paralympic competitors. Simultaneously, municipal engineering crews worked in overlapping shifts to modify competition venues by installing large-scale modular ramps, expanding accessible bathroom facilities, and reconfiguring fields to meet adapted sports regulations. The interval also allowed for the mass installation of hydraulic lifts across the city's transit fleet and adapt the look of the games for the Paralympics.However, executing these extensive structural modifications within a tight timeframe compressed the operational timeline. Furthermore, political and medical concerns emerged due to a severe summer heatwave affecting the Mediterranean region. Because athletes with spinal cord injuries or specific physical disabilities face significant thermoregulation impairments, hosting a mass outdoor parade during the peak heat of a late-summer afternoon posed severe clinical risks of hyperthermia and dehydration. To ensure both structural safety and athlete well-being, contemporary archival reports from La Vanguardia document that organizers executed a last-minute schedule adjustment, delaying the entire event framework by 24 hours. Consequently, the Opening Ceremony was rescheduled to the cooler evening of Thursday, September 3, 1992, while the Closing Ceremony was subsequently shifted to September 14 to preserve the planned 12-day duration of the sporting competitions.

==== Final Financial Impact ====
From the final 9 billion peseta budget for the Paralympic Games, ONCE contributed 4 billion pesetas directly—equivalent to approximately 45% of the total cost of the event. This private contribution enabled the full implementation of the accessibility plan and the maintenance of the operational equality criteria established for the 1992 edition.

==== Madrid 1992 ====
After the Games in Catalonia, ONCE and COOB '92 also helped to organize the Paralympic Games for the Mentally Disabled, which were held in Madrid following the closing ceremonies in Barcelona. It featured sports such as athletics, basketball, indoor football, swimming and table tennis.

==== ICC Last Games ====
Despite what had been agreed in 1989, in which Barcelona and Madrid would be the last Paralympics organized by the International Coordination Committee (ICC) and that from the Winter Games of 1994 onwards, the powers to organize the Paralympic Games would belong to the International Paralympic Committee (IPC).

== Sports ==
In Barcelona,the games consisted of 489 events spread over fifteen sports. Powerlifting and weightlifting were considered to be a single sport. Wheelchair tennis, a demonstration sport at the 1988 Summer Paralympics, was contested as an official medal sport for the first time. This was the first time that lawn bowls and snooker were dropped from the Summer Paralympic Games program.

- Archery
- Athletics
- Boccia
- Cycling
- Football 7-a-side
- Goalball
- Judo
- Lifting
  - Powerlifting
  - Weightlifting
- Shooting
- Swimming
- Table tennis
- Volleyball
- Wheelchair basketball
- Wheelchair fencing
- Wheelchair tennis

== Venues ==
Facilities of the 1992 Summer Paralympics in Barcelona and Badalona. Navigate the map for other facilities.

In total 11 venues were used at the 1992 Summer Olympics and one new one was used at the Games in Barcelona.

=== Montjuic ===
- Estadi Olímpic de Montjuïc – opening/closing ceremonies, athletics
- Palau Sant Jordi
  - Main Hall:table tennis
  - Auxiliary Hall:volleyball
- Piscines Bernat Picornell – swimming
- INEFC
  - Hall 1:wheelchair fencing
  - Hall 2:judo
- Estadi Pau Negre – football-7-side
- Pavelló de l'Espanya Industrial – powerlifting and weightlifting
- Mataró – athletics (marathon start)

=== Parc del Mar ===
- Pavelló de la Mar Bella – boccia

=== Vall d'Hebron ===
In the north of the city, the Horta-Guinardó District, hosted three sports:

- Camp Olímpic de Tir amb Arc – archery
- Pavelló de la Vall d'Hebron – goalball
- Tennis de la Vall d'Hebron- wheelchair tennis

=== Other Venues ===
- Badalona (Palau Municipal d'Esports de Badalona) – wheelchair basketball
- Camp de Tir Olímpic de Mollet – shooting
- Sant Sadurní Cycling Circuit and Circuit de Barcelona-Catalunya – cycling (individual road race)

=== Madrid ===
- Palacio de Deportes de la Comunidad de Madrid – basketball, opening and closing ceremonies
- Ciudad de los Poetas High School – basketball
- University City of Madrid – basketball
- Universidad Politécnica de Madrid – athletics
- M86 Swimming Center – swimming
- University of Madrid- football
- Consejo Superior de Deportes- table tennis and football

== Medal count ==
A total of 1710 medals were awarded during the 1992 games: 555 gold, 557 silver, and 594 bronze (490 487 526 1503). The United States topped the medal count with more gold medals, more silver medals, and more medals overall than any other nation. Germany took the most bronze medals, with 59. The Madrid medals are counted too and added in the table In the table below, the ranking sorts by the number of gold medals earned by a nation (in this context a nation is an entity represented by a National Paralympic Committee).

* Host nation (Spain)

Rank	Nation	Gold	Silver	Bronze	Total
1	United States (USA)	75	52	48	175
2	Germany (GER)	61	51	59	171
3	Great Britain (GBR)	42	51	46	139
4	Spain (ESP)*	39	32	49	120
5	Australia (AUS)	37	37	34	108
6	France (FRA)	36	36	35	107
7	Canada (CAN)	29	23	29	81
8	Unified Team (EUN)	19	15	16	50
9	Sweden (SWE)	16	33	19	68
10	China (CHN)	16	8	7	31
11	Netherlands (NED)	14	14	12	40
12	Norway (NOR)	13	13	7	33
Totals (12 entries)		397	365	361	1,123

== Calendar ==
In the following calendar for the Barcelona 1992 Summer Paralympics, each blue box represents an event competition. The yellow boxes represent days during which medal-awarding finals for a sport are held. The number in each yellow box represents the number of finals that are contested on that day.

●	Opening ceremony	Event competitions	Event finals	●	Closing ceremony

September	Thu 3rd	Fri 4th	Sat 5th	Sun 6th	Mon 7th	Tue 8th	Wed 9th	Thu 10th	Fri 11th	Sat 12th	Sun 13th	Mon 14th	Tue Gold Medals
Ceremonies	OC											CC	—N/a
Archery				●	●	3	2	3					7
Athletics		20	25	30	28	27	26	22	20	24	7		214
Boccia				●	●		3						3
Cycling				3			4			2			9
Football 7-a-side		●		●		●		●		1			1
Goalball			●	●	●	●	●	●	●	●	2		2
Judo									3	2	2		7
Powerlifting								5	5				10
Shooting						2	3	3	3	3	2		16
Swimming		14	17	19	18	17	16	15	14	13	10		163
Table tennis		●	●	●	●		●	●	19	●	11		30
Volleyball		●	●	●	●	●	●		●	●	2		2
Weightlifting				2	2	1							5
Wheelchair basketball		●	●	●	●	●	●	●	●	●	2		2
Wheelchair fencing		3	4	4	3								14
Wheelchair tennis		●	●	●		●	●		●	2	2		4
Total	0	37	46	56	51	51	55	48	50	50	40	0	487

== Participating delegations ==
103 delegations participated at the 1992 Summer Paralympics.

South Africa returned to the Paralympics for the first time since being declared "undesirable" due to its policy of apartheid in 1980. Countries who made their first appearances in the Barcelona Games were Algeria, Burkina Faso, Chile, Chinese Taipei, Costa Rica, Cuba, Dominican Republic, Iraq, Myanmar, Namibia, Nigeria, Pakistan, Panama, Seychelles, Tanzania, Turkey, United Arab Emirates, Uruguay and Yemen.

Germany competed as a reunified country for the first time in the Summer Paralympics after the Fall of the Berlin Wall. Latvia and Lithuania competed as independent countries for the first time due to the dissolution of the Soviet Union (Estonia having competed independently at the 1992 Winter Paralympics as well), while Croatia and Slovenia did the same due to the dissolution of Yugoslavia. The remainder of Yugoslavia competed as Independent Paralympic Participants due to sanctions. Some former Soviet republics competed as a Unified Team (consisting of Armenia, Azerbaijan, Belarus, Kyrgyzstan, Moldova, Russia and Ukraine), all of whom would compete independently by the 1996 Games.

Twenty-one countries did not send a delegation to Barcelona, but sent one to Madrid; they were: Aruba, Bolivia, Côte d'Ivoire, Curaçao, El Salvador, Fiji, Ghana, Guatemala, Honduras, Jordan, Lebanon, Malta, Nicaragua, Paraguay, Philippines, Romania, Saudi Arabia, Sierra Leone, Sri Lanka, Suriname and Zimbabwe.

- Algeria (8)
- Argentina (27)
- Australia (134)
- Austria (36)
- Bahrain (4)
- Belgium (73)
- Brazil (41)
- Bulgaria (7)
- Burkina Faso (3)
- Canada (138)
- Chile (2)
- China (24)
- Chinese Taipei (11)
- Colombia (6)
- Costa Rica (2)
- Croatia (6)
- Cuba (10)
- Cyprus (4)
- Czechoslovakia (29)
- Denmark (43)
- Dominican Republic (1)
- Ecuador (3)
- Egypt (41)
- Estonia (6)
- Faroe Islands (3)
- Finland (67)
- France (145)
- Germany (238)
- Great Britain (208)
- Greece (7)
- Hong Kong (21)
- Hungary (43)
- Iceland (12)
- Independent Paralympic Participants (16)
- India (9)
- Iran (29)
- Iraq (18)
- Ireland (58)
- Israel (62)
- Italy (87)
- Jamaica (4)
- Japan (76)
- Kenya (15)
- Kuwait (24)
- Latvia (2)
- Liechtenstein (3)
- Lithuania (4)
- Luxembourg (2)
- Macau (2)
- Malaysia (10)
- Mexico (19)
- Morocco (5)
- Myanmar (1)
- Namibia (2)
- Netherlands (99)
- New Zealand (13)
- Nigeria (6)
- Norway (38)
- Oman (4)
- Pakistan (2)
- Panama (2)
- Philippines (1)
- Poland (40)
- Portugal (30)
- Puerto Rico (9)
- Seychelles (2)
- Singapore (4)
- Slovenia (8)
- South Africa (10)
- South Korea (66)
- Spain (233)
- Sweden (99)
- Switzerland (41)
- Syria (2)
- Tanzania (1)
- Thailand (5)
- Tunisia (1)
- Turkey (1)
- Unified Team (62)
- United Arab Emirates (1)
- United States (354)
- Uruguay (2)
- Venezuela (10)
- Yemen (3)

== Mascot ==
The official mascot was Petra, an armless girl designed by Javier Mariscal.

== Paralympic Games for Persons with mental handicap ==
The first Paralympic Games for Persons with mental handicap were held immediately after the regular Paralympic games in the Spanish capital of Madrid from 15 to 22 September. Over 1,400 athletes from 74 nations participated in the event, which was sponsored by the Associacion Nacional de Prestura de Servicios (ANDE) and sanctioned by the International Coordinating Committee of World Sport Organizations for the Disabled and the International Association of Sport for the Mentally Handicapped. As the event in Barcelona, the games also featured a cultural exchange group, a group of intellectually disabled men from Nagasaki who played taiko (traditional drums) during the opening and closing ceremonies and selected events.

== See also ==
- 1992 Winter Olympics
- 1992 Summer Olympics
- 1992 Winter Paralympics
- Cheating at the Paralympic Games

Preceded by Seoul	Summer Paralympics; Barcelona–Madrid; IX Paralympic Summer Games (1992)	Succeeded by Atlanta
