= 1996 Summer Paralympics =

Multi-parasport event in Atlanta, Georgia, US

X Paralympic Games
- Location: Atlanta, United States
- Motto: The Triumph of the Human Spirit
- Nations: 104
- Athletes: 3,259
- Events: 517 in 19 sports
- Opening: August 15, 1996
- Closing: August 25, 1996
- Opened by: Vice President Al Gore
- Closed by: IPC President Robert Steadward
- Cauldron: Mark Wellman
- Stadium: Centennial Olympic Stadium

The 1996 Summer Paralympic in Atlanta, Georgia, United States, were held from August 15 to 25. It was the first Paralympics to get mass media sponsorship, and had a budget of US$81 million.

It was the first Paralympic Games where International Sports Federation for Persons with an Intellectual Disability athletes were given full medal status.

== Bidding history ==
In an interview with the Atlanta-based Reporters and Newspapers website, Andrew Fleming, the CEO of the Organizing Committee (APOC) and a disability rights attorney, expressed gratitude for the efforts of Alana Shepherd. Shepherd founded the world-renowned Shepherd Center, one of the first hospitals dedicated to rehabilitating victims of cervical spine accidents. Until March 1992, it was uncertain whether the 1996 Summer Paralympics would be held in Atlanta, as the event was not part of the original plan and did not include the possibility of being hosted two weeks after the Olympic Games closing ceremonies. Despite the lack of coordination between the two organizing committees, the Paralympics began to be promoted and had already developed a visual identity and international presence.

Concerns arose from various areas, including the disorganization of the Olympic Games' Organizing Committee (ACOG) and financial issues that threatened planning the games. Between 1990 and 1992, the Shepherd family noticed a lack of interest in hosting the Paralympic Games in Atlanta, with neglect from local authorities, Olympic sponsors, and large international corporations headquartered in the city. This affected the financing and promotion of the 1996 Summer Paralympic Games, which could have led to significant ticket and licensed product sales. Fleming recalled an interview with Shepherd, noting that if Atlanta failed to host the Games, Great Britain was considered "Plan B" by the newly formed International Paralympic Committee (IPC). Andrew Flaming, president of the then-APOC also mentioned in an interview that the 1984 Summer Olympics budgetary issues were repeated in Atlanta. In 1984, Los Angeles "forgot" the Paralympics, later dubbed "the last-minute games", which were hosted by New York City and Stoke Mandeville in Great Britain. Unlike Seoul, which signed late cooperation agreements for the Paralympics, Barcelona decided to organize both events under the same committee in 1987. This decision increased pressure on American organizers, as it was the first time in history that the two events were held together.

In 1990, when Atlanta won the rights to host the 1996 Summer Olympics, a group led by Fleming and the Shepherd family matriarch worked hard to create and submit a bid for the Paralympics, a project that took a year and a half to complete. Fleming noted that Olympic organizers were skeptical about hosting the Paralympics half a week after the Olympics and did not want to commit to them. Consequently, achieving the planned budget of nearly $80 million was challenging, as the Paralympics lacked funding and media rights sales.

Fleming recalled a market survey revealing that only 2% of city locals were aware of the Paralympic Games, compared to 4% who knew about the Atlanta Youth Games. As time passed, this situation became public in 1991, causing internal tensions within the Olympic organization. To avoid further damage to their image, the Atlanta Olympic Organizing Committee discreetly donated money and assisted the Paralympic Games in certain areas. Following the situation, Alana Shepherd, co-founder of the Shepherd Center, led a campaign to ensure the 1996 Summer Paralympics were held in Atlanta. After the IPC accepted the bid, she launched an aggressive strategy to involve large companies as sponsors and increase the event's visibility.

Press reports from the time described a drastic situation, with the Paralympic Organizing Committee starting its work in a small basement at the Shepherd Center due to a lack of funds to rent commercial space. After sending final documents and proposals to Belgium in late 1990 and making informal agreements the following year, the Shepherd Center Committee spent 1.5 years developing their proposal, which was officially presented during the 1992 Winter Paralympics in Tignes, France.

== A different kind of competition ==
Shortly after the IPC announced that Atlanta's civil society proposal to host the Paralympics. Another race against time had started, and this one was seen as the worst, as the bidding committee had to get corporate and large sponsors. During the bidding campaign companies like Microsoft, Coca-Cola, CNN and Home Depot were originally committed to buy sponsorship shares, but when the United States Olympic Committee (USOC) executives learned of these promises, they were concerned about that all things that might impact on the "Atlanta 1996 Olympic Summer Games" brand and they turned an uncooperative factor about the Paralympic Games. The USOC understood that any move by the United States Paralympic Committee (USPC) could affect the USOC brand and their stakeholders. The US Department of Justice was sued by the USOC over the Paralympic Games mascot, the phoenix Blaze. Fleming also said the deal was the trap worked perfectly and required them to approach only corporate sponsors who had already signed an Olympics sponsorship agreement. When one Olympic sponsor declined, the Paralympics organizers could only request a competitor with the withdrawing company's permission. As main example, Fleming said that McDonald's refused to buy a sponsorship quota or act as a partner in a supplier area and the Paralympic catering services, and if any direct competing company wanted to buy it, APOC would have to ask permission for the withdrawing company to sign the contract. It "would not let them solicit Chick-fil-A, even though Dan Cathy, one of its main executives, had a chair at the organizing committee". Upon realizing she and all of the Paralympic Organizing Committee were being ambushed, Alana Shepherd abruptly broken unilaterally all previously signed contracts, taking the personal risk on this issue and through a press conference and released a list she dubbed the "Sinful Six", as their name were handwritten by her on a piece of paper. This nicknames was given, because along with McDonald's another five Olympic Sponsors did not signed a contract to the Paralympics and blocked eventual negotiations with their direct competitors. On this list were this names: Anheuser-Busch, Visa, Bausch and Lomb, John Hancock Financial and Sara Lee. "I keep the list in my wallet," Shepherd told a reporter at the time. In recent interviews, Shepherd declines to say much about this situation and the deal. "I'm taking the high road now... I'm not digging it up," she said, but added, "They were the losers. We were the winners." She also attended the 1992 Summer Olympics and the 1992 Summer Paralympics in Barcelona, Spain, and in a stroke of fate happened to have Juan Antonio Samaranch, the then president of the International Olympic Committee, sitting next to her and in an informal talking she said. "You know, it's crazy to have two different committees holding events at the same places," she recalled. "They didn't understand it, they were scared of it," she said of Olympics officials' attitude toward the Paralympics. "It was something they didn't understand would help the city become more accessible."

All of these issues were a concern for the IPC since the beginning of the application process and example of this concerns were reported during the entity's General Assembly held in November 1995 in Tokyo, Japan.

Racing against time and all risks, Shepard raised the US$81 million needed to hold the event. Without the involvement of any public authority, Atlanta successfully held the IX edition of the Summer Paralympic Games. But unlike what had happened four years earlier, not all Olympic Games competition venues were used and the same Barcelona experience could not be delivered. But, contrary to predictions, the event made an impressive profit of millions of dollars, and that amount was used to create BlazeSports America, a Norcross-based non-profit organization that runs sports programs for children and veterans with disabilities.

== Atlanta aftermath ==
Flaming and Shepherd believes until today that Samaranch and others must have heard the key message of these struggles. "After Atlanta, the IOC said it would not accept an Olympic bid unless it also made provisions for the Paralympic Games," Fleming said. "The IOC leadership essentially said, 'The Paralympic movement is not going away, especially after Atlanta...'and this was already happening, a few months after the closing of the Atlanta Games, the International Olympic Committee announced that it had changed the rules of the application process and starting from the 2000 Summer Olympics would not accept a bid if the city filed a bid without disclosing its plans for the Paralympic Games. Following this difficult process, when bidding for the Olympic Games between 1991 and 1993, the eventual winner - the Australian city of Sydney - did not originally guarantee that the city wanted to host the Paralympics. But during the process, they changed their attitudes and promised that apart the two events had the possibility to be organized by two different parties, they would give the same treatment to all the participants and public who went to go to Australia for the two events. This also encompassed planning, financing, security, logistics, marketing and ticket sales. This joint planning give the opportunity to share all the functions and made until that Games, won the title of "the best ever" until that date.

The Atlanta 1996 Summer Paralympic Games budget troubles led the IOC to take and study some changes on their management. In the first action held in 1993, IOC and IPC signed a joint protocol of strategic partnership and they undertook to include topics related to the Olympic and Paralympic Games in the evaluation questionnaires that would be sent to the cities interested in the 2002 Winter Olympics and the 2004 Summer Olympics. Occasionally, another American city Salt Lake City would be elected to host the 2002 Winter Olympics. In a different way that held in Atlanta, as they assumed the responsibility to host the 2002 Winter Paralympics if they won. While of the 11 cities applying for the 2004 Games, 6 had also chosen the joint management model.

Five years later, and after the large and unprecedented success of the 1998 Winter Paralympics and the 2000 Summer Paralympics in 2001, after a change at the Olympic Charter, the International Paralympic Committee became an effective collaborator of the International Olympic Committee, and its president became a compulsory member of the IOC. With that, a cooperation agreement was signed informally called "One city, two events" and from then on, the same city and the same Organizing Committee would be responsible for the Olympic Games and the Paralympic Games of the same year, and this concept started to be used during the process that led Beijing to win the process to host the 2008 Summer Olympics.

== Incidents during the Games ==
In addition to the organizational and funding issues between the two committees, other difficulties arose when Paralympic athletes arrived at the Olympic Village. The first delegations to register expressed dissatisfaction with the condition of the accommodations, the availability of food, and especially the logistics between the village and the venues due to distance and accessibility challenges. These problems were not the first reported during the "transition period" from August 5 to 15.

Several media outlets covering the games highlighted accusations that the Olympic Games Organizing Committee was negligent regarding village services, raising concerns about numerous contractual failures between the two parties. This agreement included infrastructure issues, such as site maintenance and cleaning, until APOC could assume operational control. When athletes accessed their accommodations, they discovered missing furniture, and several electronic devices and sockets had been ripped out, turning the residential areas into a disarray. The criticism was so widespread that ACOG publicly denied the situation, claiming that some delegations had arrived two days earlier than planned.

Logistics and accessibility were significant issues, as competitions took place in 17 venues across Metro Atlanta, with only three near the village and six exclusive venues for the Paralympics located within Georgia University System institutions that had served as training facilities during the Olympic Games. The original contract only included some shared competition venues.

Another embarrassing situation arose from how APOC managed athletes with intellectual disabilities, who were included in the Summer Paralympics for the first time. The decision to include them was made late, in 1995, and they were not mentioned in official publicity materials or during the opening ceremony and their early competitions. Despite repeated complaints from Bernard Athos, then president of the International Association of Sports for People with Intellectual Disabilities (INAS-FMH), APOC initially ignored these concerns. The issue gained attention when journalists covering the games reported it, prompting APOC to announce through a press release that the oversight had been unintentional.

== Look of the Games ==
The visual concept for this edition was called "The Ascending Flame" and was based on the logo called "StarFire" released in 1992. The design was developed by Copeland Design, who had created all the visual concepts for the city's bid for the Olympic Games. The office took advantage of public knowledge that the two events would be held separately, and a totally different corporate identity was created. It was believed that this would be the largest ever edition of the Paralympics, and that echoed in the logo which is similar to the logo of the Olympic Games bid. The chosen graphic connected with the constant expansion and recent recognition of the Paralympic Movement around the world, and the fact that the Paralympics "was ceasing to be a second class event and now they are enter into a mainstream visibility". The highest feature at the concept of "The Ascending Flame" is a special feature of Atlanta as one of main logistics hubs in the world, as during this time, the Hartsfield-Jackson Atlanta International Airport had become one of the main airports in the world and led to the city's first period of rapid development. Another recurring idea was that this issue could serve as the "light of inspiration" for the issue of basic rights for people with disabilities around the world in a parallel with Martin Luther King Jr. and the civil rights movement. Another association was held with the city's nickname of "The Phoenix City," because of its reconstruction after being repeatedly destroyed, parallel to the life story of each participating athlete. The last connection would be in a direct relation with the Paralympic flame, which in this iteration was born from a spark of the eternal flame that burns at King Center.

According to a survey carried out by the Atlanta History Center, there are few recorded materials about the development of this project. However, Copeland Design was also responsible for creating the visual identity. In these documents, the so-called concept of "The Ascendent Flame" is explained and associated with the Games slogan that was "The Triumph of the Human Spirit" along the mascot that was the phoenix Blaze.

== Paralympic torch relay ==
The 1996 Summer Paralympics torch relay, also referred to as the NationsBank Paralympic Torch Relay to reflect the event's lead sponsor, was held between August 5 and August 15, leading up to the 1996 Summer Paralympics in Atlanta, Georgia, United States. It was the first Paralympic torch relay held in the United States, beginning at the King Center in Atlanta, then being run from Washington, D.C. to the Centennial Olympic Stadium

== Mascot ==
The mascot for the 1996 Summer Paralympics was a phoenix named Blaze. Blaze was created by Atlanta artist Trevor Stone Irvin.

== Sports ==
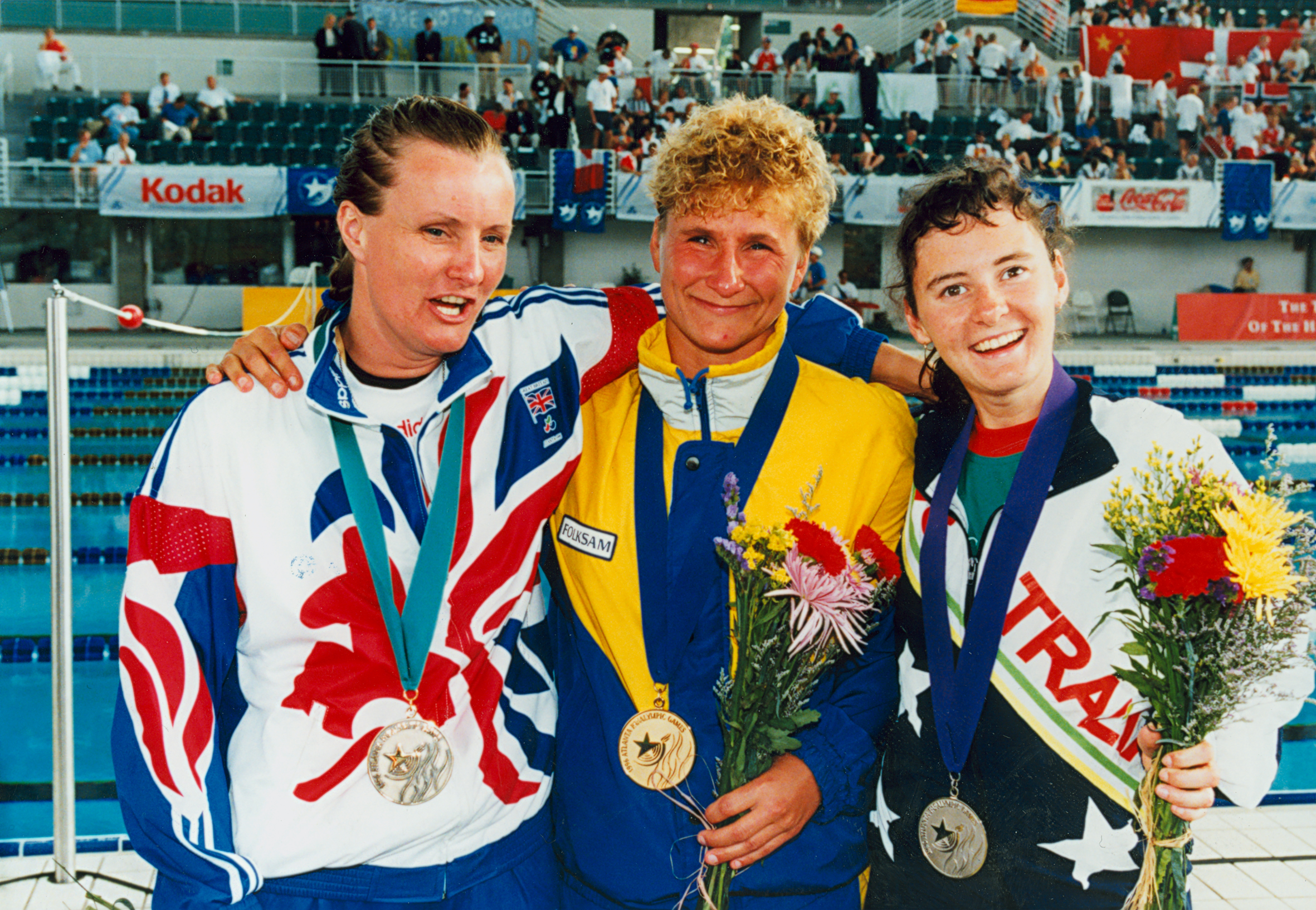
Eila Nilsson of Sweden celebrating her 50 m freestyle B1 gold with Janice Burton of Great Britain and Tracey Cross of Australia.

The games consisted of 517 finals spread over 19 sports, including two demonstration sports.

- Archery
- Athletics
- Boccia
- Cycling
- Equestrian
- Football 7-a-side
- Goalball
- Judo
- Lawn bowls
- Powerlifting
- Sailing (demonstration sport, but medals awarded)
- Shooting
- Swimming
- Table tennis
- Volleyball
- Wheelchair basketball
- Wheelchair fencing
- Wheelchair rugby (demonstration sport, but medals awarded)
- Wheelchair tennis

A group of Australian supporters at the opening ceremony of the 1996 Atlanta Paralympic Games

== Venues ==
In total 16 venues were used during the Games.Ten were also used during the 1996 Summer Olympics and six new were used exclusively for the Paralympics.

=== Olympic Ring ===
- Centennial Olympic Stadium – opening/closing ceremonies, athletics
- Alexander Memorial Coliseum – standing volleyball
- Georgia Tech Aquatic Center – swimming

=== Metro Atlanta ===
- Henderson Arena – judo and wheelchair rugby
- Panther Stadium – lawn bowls and 7-side-football
- Woodruff P.E. Center – boccia
- GSU Sports Arena – goalball
- Marriott Marquis – powerlifting
- Sheffield Building – wheelchair fencing
- Forbes Arena – wheelchair basketball
- Omni Coliseum – wheelchair basketball (finals)
- Clayton State Arena – sitting volleyball
- Wolf Creek Shooting Complex – shooting
- Stone Mountain Park – archery, wheelchair tennis and cycling

=== Duluth, Georgia ===
- Gwinnett Center – table tennis

=== Another Venues ===
- Lake Lanier – yachting
- Georgia International Horse Park – equestrian

== Calendar ==
In the following calendar for the 1996 Summer Paralympics, each blue box represents an event competition. The yellow boxes represent days during which medal-awarding finals for a sport are held. The number in each yellow box represents the number of finals that are contested on that day.

●	Opening ceremony	Event competitions	Event finals	●	Closing ceremony

August	Thu 15th	Fri 16th	Sat 17th	Sun 18th	Mon 19th	Tue 20th	Wed 21st	Thu 22nd	Fri 23rd	Sat 24th	Sun 25th	Gold Medals
Ceremonies	OC										CC	—N/a
Archery					●	●	●	5	3			8
Athletics			18	26	29	28	27	22	28	26	19	223
Boccia				●	●	●	●	5				5
Cycling Track			3	6	2							11
Cycling Road						4	4	4				12
Equestrian						4	5					9
Football 7-a-side			●		●		●		●		1	1
Goalball			●	●	●	●	●	●	2			2
Judo		2	2	3								7
Lawn Bowls			●	●	●	●	●	4	4			8
Powerlifting						2	2	2	2	2		10
Sailing				●	●	●	●	1				1
Shooting					2	3	2	2	1	2	2	15
Sitting volleyball		●	●	●	●	●		●	●	1		1
Standing volleyball		●	●	●	●	●	●	1				1
Swimming			19	20	15	12	19	19	15	28	21	168
Table Tennis			●	●	7	●	●	17	●	4		28
Wheelchair basketball		●	●	●	●	●	●	●	●	1	1	2
Wheelchair fencing			4	2	4	2	3					9
Wheelchair rugby						●	●	●	1			1
Wheelchair tennis		●	●	●	●	●	●	●	1	3		4
Total	0	2	42	57	59	55	43	82	57	64	44	517

== Medal count ==
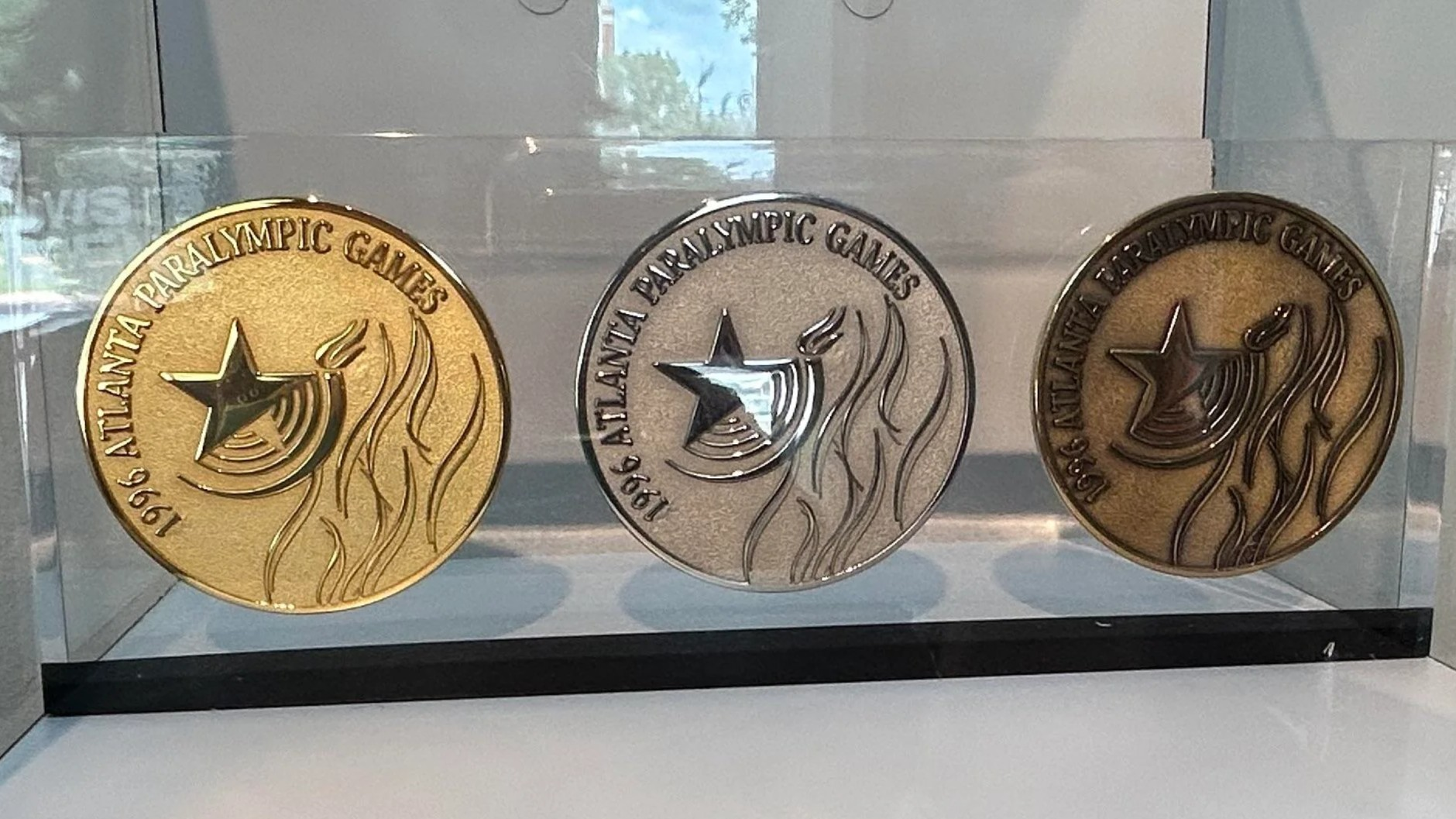
The medals of the 1996 Summer Paralympics

A total of 1574 medals were awarded during the Atlanta games: 517 gold, 516 silver, and 541 bronze. The host country, the United States, topped the medal count with more gold medals, more bronze medals, and more medals overall than any other nation. Germany took the most silver medals, with 58.

In the table below, the ranking sorts by the number of gold medals earned by the top ten nations (in this context a nation is an entity represented by a National Paralympic Committee). The number of silver medals is taken into consideration next and then the number of bronze medals.

Host country (United States)

Rank	Nation	Gold	Silver	Bronze	Total
1	United States (USA)*	47	46	66	159
2	Australia (AUS)	42	37	27	106
3	Germany (GER)	40	58	51	149
4	Great Britain (GBR)	40	42	41	123
5	Spain (ESP)	39	31	36	106
6	France (FRA)	35	29	31	95
7	Canada (CAN)	24	23	24	71
8	Netherlands (NED)	17	11	17	45
9	China (CHN)	16	13	10	39
10	Japan (JPN)	14	10	13	37
Totals (10 entries)		314	300	316	930

== Participating delegations ==
A total of 104 National Paralympic Committees were represented at the 1996 Games, and the combined total of athletes was about 3,260.Countries who made their first appearances in the Atlanta Games were : Afghanistan, Angola, Armenia, Azerbaijan, Bermuda, Bosnia and Herzegovina, Former Yugoslavian Republic of Macedonia, Honduras, Kyrgyzstan, Libya, Mauritius, Moldova, Qatar, Saudi Arabia, Sierra Leone, Ukraine and Zambia.

Participating National Paralympic Committees
- Afghanistan (2)
- Algeria (9)
- Angola (2)
- Argentina (56)
- Armenia (5)
- Australia (166)
- Austria (49)
- Azerbaijan (2)
- Bahrain (6)
- Belarus (15)
- Belgium (38)
- Bermuda (2)
- Bosnia and Herzegovina (2)
- Brazil (60)
- Bulgaria (6)
- Burkina Faso (3)
- Canada (133)
- Chile (2)
- China (37)
- Colombia (2)
- Croatia (5)
- Cuba (10)
- Cyprus (4)
- Czech Republic (43)
- Denmark (45)
- Dominican Republic (2)
- Ecuador (2)
- Egypt (31)
- Estonia (10)
- Faroe Islands (1)
- Fiji (2)
- Finland (65)
- Macedonia (1)
- France (148)
- Germany (231)
- Great Britain (248)
- Greece (16)
- Honduras (2)
- Hong Kong (25)
- Hungary (42)
- Iceland (10)
- India (9)
- Indonesia (1)
- Iran (30)
- Iraq (12)
- Ireland (63)
- Israel (40)
- Italy (79)
- Jamaica (3)
- Japan (81)
- Jordan (5)
- Kazakhstan (13)
- Kenya (17)
- South Korea (65)
- Kuwait (17)
- Kyrgyzstan (2)
- Latvia (5)
- Libya (4)
- Lithuania (11)
- Luxembourg (1)
- Macau (1)
- Malaysia (6)
- Mauritius (2)
- Mexico (38)
- Moldova (5)
- Morocco (4)
- Netherlands (108)
- New Zealand (30)
- Nigeria (8)
- Norway (42)
- Oman (3)
- Pakistan (1)
- Panama (1)
- Peru (3)
- Poland (61)
- Portugal (35)
- Puerto Rico (5)
- Qatar (1)
- Romania (1)
- Russia (70)
- Saudi Arabia (2)
- Sierra Leone (1)
- Singapore (3)
- Slovakia (28)
- Slovenia (14)
- South Africa (40)
- Spain (196)
- Sri Lanka (1)
- Sweden (111)
- Switzerland (45)
- Syria (2)
- Chinese Taipei (14)
- Thailand (7)
- Tunisia (3)
- Uganda (1)
- Ukraine (30)
- United Arab Emirates (5)
- United States (315) (host)
- Uruguay (1)
- Venezuela (4)
- Yugoslavia (10)
- Zambia (1)
- Zimbabwe (2)

== See also ==
- 1996 Summer Olympics
- BlazeSports America, the legacy organization of the 1996 Paralympic Games

Preceded by Barcelona–Madrid	Summer Paralympics; Atlanta; X Paralympic Summer Games (1996)	Succeeded by Sydney
