= Wheelchair tennis at the 2000 Summer Paralympics – Women's singles =

Wheelchair tennis – Women's singles at the XI Paralympic Games
- Paralympic wheelchair tennis
- Venue: Sydney Olympic Park Tennis Centre

Medalists
1st place, gold medalist(s)		Esther Vergeer	Netherlands
2nd place, silver medalist(s)		Sharon Walraven	Netherlands
3rd place, bronze medalist(s)		Maaike Smit	Netherlands

Women's singles
- Wheelchair tennis at the 2000 Summer Paralympics

Events
Singles	men	women
Doubles	men	women
← 1996 ·	Summer Paralympics	· 2004 →

The women's singles wheelchair tennis competition at the 2000 Summer Paralympics in Sydney was held at the Sydney Olympic Park Tennis Centre.

== Draw ==
=== Key ===
- INV = Bipartite invitation
- IP = ITF place
- ALT = Alternate
- r = Retired
- w/o = Walkover

=== Finals ===
Semifinals
Esther Vergeer (NED)	6	6
Maaike Smit (NED)	3	1
Kimberly Dell (GBR)	2	7	2
Sharon Walraven (NED)	6	5	6

Final (gold medal match)
Esther Vergeer (NED)	6	6
Sharon Walraven (NED)	0	4
Bronze medal match
Maaike Smit (NED)	6	6
Kimberly Dell (GBR)	0	3

==== Top half ====
1/16-Final
K Korb (USA)	2	3
B Pupovac (AUS)	6	6
N Kawashima (JPN)	6	6
H Simard (CAN)	1	2
S Clark (USA)	6	6
YS Hong (KOR)	3	1
N Chinprahus (THA)	7	6
P Sax-Scharl (GER)	5	1

1/8-Final
E Vergeer (NED)	6	6
B Pupovac (AUS)	0	2
N Kawashima (JPN)	7	4	6
B Ameryckx (BEL)	5	6	7
M Smit (NED)	6	6
S Clark (USA)	4	4
N Chinprahus (THA)	2	2
J McMorran (GBR)	6	6

Quarterfinals
E Vergeer (NED)	6	6
B Ameryckx (BEL)	0	0
M Smit (NED)	2	6	6
J McMorran (GBR)	6	1	0

Semifinals
E Vergeer (NED)	6	6
M Smit (NED)	3	1

==== Bottom half ====
1/16-Final
MH Hwang (KOR)	3	6	6
A Racineux (FRA)	6	2	4
C Ohmae (JPN)	4	6	3
H Lewellen (USA)	6	4	6
C Otterbach (GER)	4	0
S Khanthasit (THA)	6	6
C Seyen (BEL)	5	2
Y Chokyu (CAN)	7	6

1/8-Final
K Dell (GBR)	2	6	7
MH Hwang (KOR)	6	3	5
H Lewellen (USA)	2	1
S Peters (NED)	6	6
S Walraven (NED)	4	7	6
S Khanthasit (THA)	6	5	2
Y Chokyu (CAN)	2	5
D Di Toro (AUS)	6	7

Quarterfinals
K Dell (GBR)	6	6
S Peters (NED)	3	3
S Walraven (NED)	6	6	7
D Di Toro (AUS)	7	2	5

Semifinals
K Dell (GBR)	2	7	2
S Walraven (NED)	6	5	6
