= Yuka Chokyu =

Canadian para badminton player and former wheelchair tennis player

Yuka Chokyu 長久 由佳
Personal information
- Nationality: Canadian
- Born: December 9, 1966 (age 59) Kashiwa, Japan
- Education: Douglas College
- Height: 1.54 m (5 ft 1 in)
- Weight: 38 kg (84 lb)

Sport
- Country: Canada
- Sport: Para badminton
Medal record
Wheelchair tennis
Representing Canada
World Team Cup
Bronze medal – third place	1999 New York City	Women's team
Para badminton
Representing Canada
Parapan American Games
Silver medal – second place	2019 Lima	Women's singles WH2
Bronze medal – third place	2023 Santiago	Women's singles WH1
Pan Am Championships
Gold medal – first place	2018 Lima	Women's doubles
Silver medal – second place	2018 Lima	Women's singles

Yuka Chokyu (born December 9, 1966) is a Canadian para badminton player and former wheelchair tennis player who competes at international level events. She was a three-time Paralympian at the Summer Paralympics from 2000 to 2008, her highest achievement in her tennis career was where she had reached the quarterfinals at the 2000 Summer Paralympics in both the women's singles and women's doubles.

== Wheelchair tennis statistics ==
Yuka Chokyu
- Country (sports): Canada

Singles
- Career record: 320-266
- Highest ranking: No. 6 (7 July 1998)

Other tournaments
- Paralympic Games: 2R (2000)

Doubles
- Career record: 255-197
- Highest ranking: No. 3 (28 January 2002)

Other doubles tournaments
- Paralympic Games: QF (2000)

=== ITF Wheelchair Tennis Tour ===
==== Singles ====
Result	Year	Tournament	Surface	Opponent	Score
Win	1995	USA Open	-	(United States) Kim Pola	3–6, 6–4, 6–2
Win	1996	British Columbia Open	-	(Canada) Diane Rakiecki	6–1, 6–1
Loss	1997	Sydney Summer Open	-	(Australia) Daniela Di Toro	2–6, 3–6
Win	1997	New Zealand Open	-	(Switzerland) Eveline Hegi	4–6, 6–2, 6–2
Loss	1998	Kobe Open	-	(Japan) Chiyoko Ohmae	6–3, 2–6, 4–6
Win	1998	Hendrickson Open	-	(Australia) Branka Pupovac	6–4, 6–1
Loss	1998	Tahoe Donner International	-	(United States) Sharon Clark	6–3, 0–6, 3–6
Win	1999	Australian Open	-	(South Korea) Hwang Myung-hee	6–0, 6–1
Loss	1999	Ontario Open	-	(Mexico) Esperanza Belmont	6–0, 6–0
Loss	1999	Roho Championships	-	(United States) Sharon Clark	4–6, 3–6
Loss	2000	Canadian Open	-	(Canada) Helene Simard	4–6, 2–6
Loss	2000	Southwest Regional Championships	-	(Australia) Branka Pupovac	1–6, 3–6
Win	2000	Peace Cup	Hard	(Japan) Kanae Kodama	6–3, 6–3
Loss	2001	Canadian Open	Hard	(Japan) Chiyoko Ohmae	5–7, 6–4, 4–6
Loss	2001	Tahoe Donner International	Hard	(United States) Sharon Clark	5–7, 2–6
Win	2001	Peace Cup	Hard	(Japan) Chiyoko Ohmae	6–2, 6–4
Win	2002	Korea Open	Hard	(Germany) Britta Siegers	4–6, 6–3, 6–2
Win	2002	Southwest Regional Championships	-	(United States) Patricia Rollison	7–6^{3}, 3–6, 6–2
Loss	2003	Southwest Regional Championships	-	(United States) Sharon Clark	3–6, 6–7^{3}
Loss	2003	CIS Marin Indoor	Carpet	(Switzerland) Sandra Kalt	5–7, 4–6
Win	2004	Birrhard Open	Clay	(Japan) Chiyoko Ohmae	6–3, 3–6, 6–4
Loss	2005	Kobe Open	Carpet	(Japan) Mie Yaosa	6–3, 0–6, 3–6
Win	2005	Canadian Open	Hard	(Canada) Helene Simard	0–6, 6–2, 6–2
Win	2005	Jana Hunsaker Memorial	Hard	(United States) Beth Arnoult	6–1, 6–2
Win	2005	Tahoe Donner International	-	(Israel) Ilanit Fridman	6–3, 6–1
Loss	2006	Music City Classic	Hard	(United States) Kaitlyn Verfuerth	6–4, 2–6, 3–6
Loss	2006	Canadian Open	Hard	(Canada) Helene Simard	6–7^{6}, 1–6
Loss	2007	Inail Citta di Livorno	Hard	(Belgium) Annick Sevenans	5–7, 6–3, 3–6
Win	2008	Northeast WT Tournament	Hard	(United Kingdom) Lucy Shuker	3–6, 4–6
Loss	2008	Minas Open	-	(Italy) Marianna Lauro	6–4, 1–6, 2–6
Win	2008	Polish Open	Clay	(United States) Kaitlyn Verfuerth	6–4, 1–6, 6–0
Win	2008	Midwest Regional Championships	Hard	(United States) Emmy Kaiser	6–2, 6–3
Win	2012	Canadian Open	Hard		
Win	2015	Negombo Open	Clay	(India) Madhu Bagri	6–0, 6–0
Win	2015	SL Open	Hard	(Australia) Luba Josevski	6–1, 6–0
Win	2015	SSC Open	Clay	(Australia) Sarah Calati	6–3, 6–3
Loss	2015	Jana Hunsaker Memorial	Hard	(United States) Shelby Baron	7–6^{4}, 5–7, 2–6

==== Doubles ====
Result	Year	Tournament	Surface	Partner	Opponent	Score
Loss	1996	Japan Open	-	(Japan) Naomi Ishimoto	(Japan) Kanae Kodama (Japan) Chiyoko Ohmae	1–6, 2–6
Loss	1996	Farwest Regional Championships	-	(United States) Patricia Rollison	(United States) Hope Lewellen (United States) Nancy Olson	2–6, 1–6
Win	1997	New Zealand Open	-	(Switzerland) Eveline Hegi	(New Zealand) Jacqueline Courtier (New Zealand) Randa Hinson	7–6, 6–4
Loss	1997	Florida Open	-	(Canada) Helene Simard	(United States) Hope Lewellen (Netherlands) Maaike Smit	6–3, 3–6, 6–7
Win	1997	Japan Open	-	(Netherlands) Chantal Vandierendonck	(Japan) Kanae Kodama (Japan) Chiyoko Ohmae	6–4, 6–2
Win	1997	Farwest Regional Championships	-	(Canada) Helene Simard	(United States) Joy Dryden (United States) Patricia Rollison	6–2, 6–4
Win	1997	Southwest Regional Championships	-	(United States) Lynn Seidemann	(United States) Hope Lewellen (United States) Sharon Clark	Walkover
Loss	1998	Australian Open	-	(Japan) Chiyoko Ohmae	(Australia) Daniela Di Toro (Australia) Randa Hinson	5–7, 6–4, 1–6
Win	1998	Kobe Open	-	(Netherlands) Sharon Walraven	(Japan) Kanae Kodama (Japan) Chiyoko Ohmae	7–5, 6–4
Loss	1998	Belgian Open	-	(Canada) Helene Simard	(Netherlands) Sonja Peters (Netherlands) Esther Vergeer	1–6, 6–7
Win	1998	Tahoe Donner International	-	(United States) Patricia Rollison	(United States) Hope Lewellen (United States) Sharon Clark	7–6, 5–7, 6–3
Loss	1999	Australian Open	-	(Japan) Chiyoko Ohmae	(Netherlands) Sharon Walraven (Netherlands) Sonja Peters	2–6, 6–1, 2–6
Win	1999	Kobe Open	-	(Netherlands) Sharon Walraven	(Japan) Norie Kawashima (Japan) Ritsuko Sakamoto	6–3, 6–1
Win	1999	Lakeshore Foundation World Challenge	-	(Belgium) Brigitte Ameryckx	(Switzerland) Sonja Peters (Netherlands) Sharon Walraven	5–7, 6–4, 7–5
Win	1999	Dutch Open	-	(Canada) Helene Simard	(Netherlands) Sonja Peters (Netherlands) Esther Vergeer	Walkover
Loss	1999	Austrian Open	-	(Australia) Branka Pupovac	(Netherlands) Maaike Smit (Netherlands) Sharon Walraven	3–6, 6–1, 1–6
Win	1999	Southwest Regional Championships	Clay	(United States) Patricia Rollison	(United States) Karin Korb (United States) Hope Lewellen	6–3, 6–3
Loss	1999	Roho Championships	-	(United States) Sharon Clark	(United States) Karin Korb (United States) Nancy Olson	5–7, 5–7
Loss	1999	US Open	Carpet	(Japan) Chiyoko Ohmae	(Netherlands) Sonja Peters (Netherlands) Esther Vergeer	0–6, 0–6
Loss	2000	Queensland Open	-	(Switzerland) Sandra Salzgeber	(United Kingdom) Kimberly Blake (Australia) Branka Pupovac	4–6, 1–6
Loss	2000	Kobe Open	-	(Thailand) Chanungarn Techamaneewat	(Netherlands) Sharon Walraven (Netherlands) Djoke van Marum	2–6, 1–6
Loss	2000	Usta National Outdoor Championships	-	(Canada) Helene Simard	(Netherlands) Sharon Walraven (Netherlands) Djoke van Marum	6–7, 3–6,
Win	2000	Farwest Regional Championships	-	(Netherlands) Sonja Peters	(Netherlands) Sharon Walraven (Netherlands) Djoke van Marum	4–6, 3–6
Win	2000	Southwest Regional Championships	-	(United States) Patricia Rollison		
Win	2000	Peace Cup	Hard	(Japan) Chiyoko Ohmae		
Loss	2001	Sydney International	Hard	(Japan) Chiyoko Ohmae	(Australia) Daniela Di Toro (Netherlands) Sharon Walraven	4–6, 2–6
Loss	2001	Australian Open	Hard	(Japan) Chiyoko Ohmae	(Australia) Daniela Di Toro (Netherlands) Sharon Walraven	0–6, 2–6
Loss	2001	Florida Open	Hard	(Canada) Helene Simard	(Netherlands) Maaike Smit (Netherlands) Sharon Walraven	3–6, 3–6
Win	2001	Kobe Open	Grass	(Netherlands) Sharon Walraven	(Japan) Kanae Kodama (Japan) Chiyoko Ohmae	6–4, 6–2
Win	2001	Japan Open	Hard	(Japan) Chiyoko Ohmae	(Australia) Daniela Di Toro (Australia) Lesly Page	7–5, 6–1
Win	2001	Farwest Regional Championships	Hard	(Japan) Chiyoko Ohmae	(United States) Patricia Rollison (Netherlands) Sharon Walraven	6–3, 6–0
Win	2001	Canadian Open	Hard	(Japan) Chiyoko Ohmae	(United States) Sharon Clark (United States) Patricia Rollison	6–0, 6–3
Loss	2001	British Open	Hard	(Canada) Sarah Hunter	(Netherlands) Sonja Peters (Netherlands) Esther Vergeer	2–6, 7–6, 3–6
Loss	2001	Tahoe Donner International	Hard	(Canada) Sarah Hunter	(United States) Sharon Clark (United Kingdom) Janet McMorran	5–7, 0–6
Win	2001	US Open	Hard	(United States) Patricia Rollison	(United States) Sharon Clark (United Kingdom) Janet McMorran	6–3, 6–3
Win	2001	Peace Cup	Hard	(Japan) Chiyoko Ohmae	(Japan) Kanae Kodama (Japan) Mie Yaosa	6–4, 6–3
Loss	2002	Kobe Open	-	(Japan) Chiyoko Ohmae	(Australia) Daniela Di Toro (Netherlands) Sharon Walraven	3–6, 0–6
Loss	2002	Japan Open	Hard	(Japan) Chiyoko Ohmae	(Australia) Daniela Di Toro (Netherlands) Sonja Peters	1–6, 3–6
Win	2002	Canadian Open	Hard	(Japan) Chiyoko Ohmae	(United States) Sharon Clark (Canada) Helene Simard	6–1, 6–7, 7–5
Win	2002	Tahoe Donner International	-	(Japan) Chiyoko Ohmae	(United States) Denise Esrey (United States) Patricia Rollison	6–1, 6–1
Win	2002	US Open	-	(Japan) Chiyoko Ohmae	(Netherlands) Maaike Smit (Netherlands) Esther Vergeer	1–6, 4–6
Loss	2003	Kobe Open	Hard	(Canada) Sarah Hunter	(Australia) Daniela Di Toro (Netherlands) Sharon Walraven	4–6, 2–6
Loss	2003	Korea Open	Hard	(Netherlands) Sharon Walraven	(South Korea) Hong Young-suk (Thailand) Sakhorn Khanthasit	6–3, 1–6, 2–6
Win	2003	Canadian Open	Hard	(Japan) Chiyoko Ohmae	(United States) Julia Dorsett (United States) Kaitlyn Verfuerth	6–2, 6–0
Win	2003	Southwest Regional Championships	-	(Mexico) Claudia Taboada	(United States) Sharon Clark (United States) Julia Dorsett	4–6, 6–2, 6–2
Win	2004	New Zealand Open	Hard	(Canada) Helene Simard	(United States) Sharon Clark (United States) Julia Dorsett	6–3, 7–5
Loss	2005	Classic 8's Australian Open	Hard	(Japan) Mie Yaosa	(France) Florence Gravellier (Netherlands) Maaike Smit	3–6, 3–6
Win	2005	Sydney International	Hard	(Switzerland) Karin Suter-Erath	(Germany) Britta Siegers (Netherlands) Sharon Walraven	6–1, 6–3
Loss	2005	Australian Open	-	(Netherlands) Jiske Griffioen	(France) Florence Gravellier (Netherlands) Maaike Smit	4–6, 6–1, 1–6
Loss	2005	Japan Open	Hard	(Switzerland) Karin Suter-Erath	(France) Florence Gravellier (Netherlands) Jiske Griffioen	2–6, 3–6
Loss	2005	Midwest Regional Championships	Hard	(United States) Jan Proctor	(Canada) Annie Morissette (Canada) Helene Simard	6–3, 6–1
Win	2005	USTA	Hard	(United States) Beth Arnoult	(Netherlands) Korie Homan (Netherlands) Esther Vergeer	4–6, 4–6
Win	2005	Tahoe Donner International	-	(Israel) Ilanit Fridman	(United States) Jan Proctor (Canada) Helene Simard	6–2, 6–7^{5}, 6–2
Win	2005	Peace Cup	Hard	(South Korea) Park Ju-youn	(South Korea) Hong Young-suk (South Korea) Hwang Myung-hee	0–6, 3–6
Win	2006	Classic 8's Australian Open	Hard	(Japan) Mie Yaosa	(Netherlands) Jiske Griffioen (Netherlands) Esther Vergeer	2–6, 0–6
Loss	2006	Australian Open	Hard	(Switzerland) Karin Suter-Erath	(Netherlands) Jiske Griffioen (Netherlands) Esther Vergeer	Walkover
Loss	2006	Pensacola Open	Hard	(Canada) Helene Simard	(France) Florence Gravellier (Netherlands) Esther Vergeer	3–6, 1–6
Win	2006	Korea Open	Hard	(Netherlands) Sharon Walraven	(Japan) Chiyoko Ohmae (Japan) Mie Yaosa	6–4, 5–7, 6–4
Loss	2006	Swiss Open	Hard	(Japan) Mie Yaosa	(Netherlands) Maaike Smit (Netherlands) Esther Vergeer	0–6, 1–6
Loss	2006	ROHO Championships	Hard	(United Kingdom) Lucy Shuker	(France) Florence Gravellier (Netherlands) Esther Vergeer	2–6, 4–6
Loss	2007	ATH Open	Clay	(Japan) Chiyoko Ohmae	(Belgium) Brigitte Ameryckx (Belgium) Annick Sevenans	0–6, 0–6
Loss	2007	Salzburg Open	Hard	(Japan) Chiyoko Ohmae	(Poland) Agnieszka Wysocka (Germany) Katharina Kruger	5–7, 0–6
Win	2007	Inail Citta di Livorno	Hard	(Belgium) Annick Sevenans	(Italy) Silvia de Maria (Italy) Marianna Lauro	6–1, 4–6, 6–1
Win	2007	Nottingham Indoor	Hard	(Japan) Mie Yaosa	(Netherlands) Jiske Griffioen (Netherlands) Aniek van Koot	7–6, 6–4
Win	2008	Argentina Open	Clay	(Japan) Kanako Domori	(Italy) Silvia de Maria (Italy) Marianna Lauro	6–1, 6–4
Loss	2008	Atlanta Open	Hard	(Japan) Chiyoko Ohmae	(United States) Beth Arnoult (United States) Kaitlyn Verfuerth	6–7^{4}, 5–7
Win	2008	Peace Cup	Hard	(Japan) Kanako Domori	(South Korea) Hwang Myung-hee (South Korea) Park Ju-youn	6–3, 6–0
Loss	2009	Florida Open	Hard	(United Kingdom) Jordanne Whiley	(France) Florence Gravellier (United Kingdom) Lucy Shuker	2–6, 2–6
Loss	2009	Cajun Classic	Hard	(Colombia) Johana Martínez	(United Kingdom) Lucy Shuker (Netherlands) Aniek van Koot	2–6, 4–6
Loss	2009	Japan Open	Hard	(Netherlands) Sharon Walraven	(Australia) Daniela Di Toro (France) Florence Gravellier	Walkover
Win	2011	ATH Open	Clay	(Spain) Barbara Vidal	(Spain) Elena Jacinto (Spain) Lola Ochoa	6–2, 4–3 retired
Loss	2011	PTR Championships	Hard	(Japan) Kanako Domori	(United Kingdom) Louise Hunt (United Kingdom) Lucy Shuker	6–7^{8}, 6–4, 4–6
Loss	2012	Sydney International	Hard	(Japan) Kanako Domori	(Netherlands) Marjolein Buis (Netherlands) Aniek van Koot	1–6, 6–4, 4–6
Loss	2012	US Open	Hard	(Chile) Francisca Mardones	(Germany) Sabine Ellerbrock (Netherlands) Sharon Walraven	4–6, 2–6
Win	2012	Tennis Canada International	Hard	(Japan) Mika Ishikawa	(Canada) Kirsten Sharp (Canada) Amanda Pinheiro	6–0, 6–0
Win	2015	SSC Open	Clay	(Australia) Janel Manns		
Win	2015	Texas Open	Hard	(United States) Elizabeth Williams	(Mexico) Claudia Taboada (Mexico) Rosalba Vazquez	4–6, 6–3, 10–7
Win	2015	Jana Hunsaker Memorial	Hard	(United States) Marianne Page	(Mexico) Claudia Taboada (Mexico) Rosalba Vazquez	6–0, 6–3
Win	2015	Windsor Classic	Hard	(United States) Elizabeth Williams	(France) Emilie Chéné (United States) Emmy Kaiser	1–6, 1–6
Win	2017	Vancouver International	Hard	(Japan) Mika Ishikawa	(Japan) Kanako Domori (Japan) Mie Fukazawa	2–6, 2–6

== Para-badminton statistics ==
Yuka Chokyu
Sport
- Country: Canada
- Sport: Badminton
- Coached by: Ram Nayyar

Women's singles WH1 Women's doubles WH1–WH2 Mixed doubles WH1–WH2
- Highest ranking: 9 (WS November 8, 2022); 8 (WD with Pilar Jáuregui 8 November 2022); 20 (XD with Mikhail Bilenki 8 November 2022)
- Current ranking: 9 (WS); 8 (WD with Pilar Jáuregui); 20 (XD with Mikhail Bilenki) (November 8, 2022)

=== Parapan American Games ===
Women's singles
Year	Venue	Opponent	Score	Result
2019	National Sport Village; Lima, Peru	(Peru) Pilar Jáuregui	12–21, 1–21	Silver

=== Pan Am Championships ===
Women's singles
Year	Venue	Opponent	Score	Result
2018	Polideportivo 2 Lima, Peru	(Peru) Pilar Jáuregui	9–21, 9–21	Silver

Women's doubles

Year	Venue	Partner	Opponent	Score	Result
2018 (Note: This tournament uses a round robin system.)	Polideportivo 2, Lima, Peru	(Peru) Pilar Jáuregui	(United States) Amy Burnett (Peru) Susy Julca	21–3, 21–0	Gold
2018	Polideportivo 2, Lima, Peru	(Peru) Pilar Jáuregui	(Brazil) Aline de Oliveira Cabral (Brazil) Daniele Torres	21–7, 21–10	Gold
2018	Polideportivo 2, Lima, Peru	(Peru) Pilar Jáuregui	(Brazil) Auricélia Evangelista (Brazil) Maria Gilda	21–11, 21–7	Gold
2018	Polideportivo 2, Lima, Peru	(Peru) Pilar Jáuregui	(Peru) Jaqueline Burgos (Chile) Catalina Jimeno	21–5, 21–3	Gold
