= Wheelchair tennis at the 2000 Summer Paralympics – Women's doubles =

Wheelchair tennis – Women's doubles at the XI Paralympic Games
- Paralympic wheelchair tennis
- Venue: Sydney Olympic Park Tennis Centre

Medalists
1st place, gold medalist(s)		Maaike Smit; Esther Vergeer	Netherlands
2nd place, silver medalist(s)		Branka Pupovac; Daniela Di Toro	Australia
3rd place, bronze medalist(s)		Christine Otterbach; Petra Sax-Scharl	Germany

Women's doubles
- Wheelchair tennis at the 2000 Summer Paralympics

Events
Singles	men	women
Doubles	men	women
← 1996 ·	Summer Paralympics	· 2004 →

The women's doubles wheelchair tennis competition at the 2000 Summer Paralympics in Sydney was held at the Sydney Olympic Park Tennis Centre.

== Draw ==
=== Key ===
- INV = Bipartite invitation
- IP = ITF place
- ALT = Alternate
- r = Retired
- w/o = Walkover

=== Finals ===
Semifinals
Maaike Smit (NED); Esther Vergeer (NED)	6	6
Janet McMorran (GBR); Kimberly Dell (GBR)	0	3
Christine Otterbach (GER); Petra Sax-Scharl (GER)	1	2
Branka Pupovac (AUS); Daniela Di Toro (AUS)	6	6

Final (gold medal match)
Maaike Smit (NED); Esther Vergeer (NED)	7	6
Branka Pupovac (AUS); Daniela Di Toro (AUS)	6	2
Bronze medal match
Janet McMorran (GBR); Kimberly Dell (GBR)	7	4	4
Christine Otterbach (GER); Petra Sax-Scharl (GER)	5	6	6

==== Top half ====
Round of 16				Quarterfinals			Semifinals
				M Smit (NED); E Vergeer (NED)	6	6
				YS Hong (KOR); MH Hwang (KOR)	1	1
							M Smit (NED); E Vergeer (NED)	6	6
N Kawashima (JPN); C Ohmae (JPN)	2	6	7				J McMorran (GBR); K Dell (GBR)	0	3
S Clark (USA); H Lewellen (USA)	6	2	6	N Kawashima (JPN); C Ohmae (JPN)	2	6
				J McMorran (GBR); C Dell (GBR)	6	7

==== Bottom half ====
Round of 16				Quarterfinals				Semifinals
				H Simard (CAN); Y Chokyu (CAN)	6	3	0
N Chinprahus (THA); S Khanthasit (THA)	5	6	3	C Otterbach (GER); P Sax-Scharl (GER)	1	6	6
C Otterbach (GER); P Sax-Scharl (GER)	7	2	6					C Otterbach (GER); P Sax-Scharl (GER)	1	2
								B Pupovac (AUS); D Di Toro (AUS)	6	6
				C Seyen (BEL); B Ameryckx (BEL)	2	3
				B Pupovac (AUS); D Di Toro (AUS)	6	6
