= Wheelchair tennis at the 2000 Summer Paralympics – Men's singles =

Wheelchair tennis – Men's singles at the XI Paralympic Games
- Paralympic wheelchair tennis
- Venue: Sydney Olympic Park Tennis Centre
- Competitors: 48

Medalists
| 1st place, gold medalist(s) | | David Hall | Australia |
| 2nd place, silver medalist(s) | | Stephen Welch | United States |
| 3rd place, bronze medalist(s) | | Kai Schramayer | Germany |

Men's singles
- Wheelchair tennis at the 2000 Summer Paralympics

Events
| Singles | men | women |
| Doubles | men | women |
- Summer Paralympics

The men's singles wheelchair tennis competition at the 2000 Summer Paralympics in Sydney was held at the Sydney Olympic Park Tennis Centre.

Australia's David Hall defeated the United States' Stephen Welch in the final, 6–7, 6–4, 6–2 to win the gold medal in men's singles wheelchair tennis at the 2000 Sydney Paralympics. In the bronze medal match, Germany's Kai Schramayer defeated Austria's Martin Legner.

The Netherlands' Ricky Molier was the defending gold medalist, but was defeated by Legner in the quarterfinals.

== Draw ==
=== Key ===
- INV = Bipartite invitation
- IP = ITF place
- ALT = Alternate
- r = Retired
- w/o = Walkover

=== Finals ===
Quarterfinals
David Hall (AUS) | 6 | 6
Robin Ammerlaan (NED) | 4 | 4
Kai Schramayer (GER) | 6 | 6
Satoshi Saida (JPN) | 2 | 1
Laurent Giammartini (FRA) | 2 | 2
Stephen Welch (USA) | 6 | 6
Martin Legner (AUT) | 3 | 6 | 6
Ricky Molier (NED) | 6 | 3 | 2

Semifinals
David Hall (AUS) | 6 | 6
Kai Schramayer (GER) | 2 | 3
Stephen Welch (USA) | 7 | 6
Martin Legner (AUT) | 5 | 2

Final (gold medal match)
David Hall (AUS) | 6 | 6 | 6
Stephen Welch (USA) | 7 | 4 | 2
Bronze medal match
Kai Schramayer (GER) | 7 | 6
Martin Legner (AUT) | 6 | 4

=== Top half ===
==== Section 1 ====
Round of 64
S Krieghofer (AUT) | 7 | 2 | 1
A Westman (SWE) | 6 | 6 | 6
S Muangprom (THA) | 3 | 1
T Purschke (GER) | 6 | 6
F Mazzei (ITA) | 3 | 6 | 7
L Farkas (HUN) | 6 | 2 | 5
C McKeage (CAN) | 7 | 6
S Hatt (GBR) | 5 | 4

Round of 32
D Hall (AUS) | 6 | 6
A Westman (SWE) | 1 | 0
T Purschke (GER) | 1 | 3
R Snow (USA) | 6 | 6
P Bonnet (FRA) | 6 | 6
F Mazzei (ITA) | 1 | 2
C McKeage (CAN) | 3 | 0
R Ammerlaan (NED) | 6 | 6

Round of 16
D Hall (AUS) | 6 | 7
R Snow (USA) | 4 | 5
P Bonnet (FRA) | 3 | 2
R Ammerlaan (NED) | 6 | 6

Quarterfinals
D Hall (AUS) | 6 | 6
R Ammerlaan (NED) | 4 | 4

==== Section 2 ====
Round of 64
P Jaroszewski (POL) | 6 | 6
YL Chen (TPE) | 4 | 4
E Miramontes (MEX) | 3 | 2
C Tresch (SUI) | 6 | 6
R de Meersman (BEL) | 6 | 3
G Naor (ISR) | 7 | 6
P Britnell (NZL) | 7 | 7
A Illobre (ESP) | 5 | 5

Round of 32
K Schramayer (GER) | 6 | 6
P Jaroszewski (POL) | 0 | 0
C Tresch (SUI) | 1 | 0
E Stuurman (NED) | 6 | 6
S Saida (JPN) | 6 | 6
G Naor (ISR) | 1 | 2
P Britnell (NZL) | 2 | 0
J Mistry (GBR) | 6 | 6

Round of 16
K Schramayer (GER) | 6 | 2 | 6
E Stuurman (NED) | 2 | 6 | 4
S Saida (JPN) | 2 | 6 | 6
J Mistry (GBR) | 6 | 1 | 4

Quarterfinals
K Schramayer (GER) | 6 | 6
S Saida (JPN) | 2 | 1

=== Bottom half ===
==== Section 1 ====
Round of 64
M Erni (SUI) | 6 | 6
J Yodyangdang (THA) | 2 | 4
G Vos (BEL) | 2 | 1
L Shevchick (RUS) | 6 | 6
B Dockerill (GBR) | 3 | 3
O Diaz (ARG) | 6 | 6
C Prohaszka (HUN) | 3 | 4
R Corona (MEX) | 6 | 6

Round of 32
D Johnson (AUS) | 6 | 6
M Erni (SUI) | 0 | 2
L Shevchick (RUS) | 3 | 0
L Giammartini (FRA) | 6 | 6
P Johnson (CAN) | 6 | 7
O Diaz (ARG) | 4 | 5
R Corona (MEX) | 1 | 1
S Welch (USA) | 6 | 6

Round of 16
D Johnson (AUS) | 3 | 6
L Giammartini (FRA) | 6 | 7
P Johnson (CAN) | 2 | 4
S Welch (USA) | 6 | 6

Quarterfinals
L Giammartini (FRA) | 2 | 2
S Welch (USA) | 6 | 6

==== Section 2 ====
Round of 64
HT Cheng (TPE) | 0 | 1
S Douglas (USA) | 6 | 6
A Yamakura (JPN) | 6 | 6
J Ramos (ESP) | 0 | 1
P Wikstrom (SWE) | 6 | 6
E Sartov (ISR) | 2 | 0
W Fleming (NZL) | 3 | 1
C Rigolo (ITA) | 6 | 6

Round of 32
M Legner (AUT) | 6 | 6
S Douglas (USA) | 3 | 1
A Yamakura (JPN) | 6 | 0 | 0
T Kruszelnicki (POL) | 4 | 6 | 6
R Weisang (GER) | 7 | 6
P Wikstrom (SWE) | 5 | 2
C Rigolo (ITA) | 2 | 1
R Molier (NED) | 6 | 6

Round of 16
M Legner (AUT) | 6 | 6
T Kruszelnicki (POL) | 4 | 3
R Weisang (GER) | 1 | 2
R Molier (NED) | 6 | 6

Quarterfinals
M Legner (AUT) | 3 | 6 | 6
R Molier (NED) | 6 | 3 | 2
