= Swimming at the 2000 Summer Paralympics – Men's 100 metre backstroke SB14 =

Men's 100m breaststroke SB14 at the XI Paralympic Games
- Paralympic Swimming

Medalists
1st place, gold medalist(s)		Alwin Houtsma	Netherlands
2nd place, silver medalist(s)		Piotr Penar	Poland
3rd place, bronze medalist(s)		Janos Racz	Hungary

The men's 100m breaststroke SB14 event took place on 20 October 2000 in Sydney, Australia.

== Results ==
=== Heat 1 ===
Rank	Athlete	Time	Notes
1	Stewart Pike (AUS)	1:12.33	Q, PR
2	Piotr Penar (POL)	1:17.42	Q
3	Isaac Pavon (ESP)	1:18.26	Q
4	Brett Reid (AUS)	1:20.14	
5	Patrick Donachie (AUS)	1:20.91	
6	Dennis Langelund (DEN)	1:23.71	
7	Craig Groenewald (RSA)	1:25.23	
8	David Gonzalez (ESP)	1:25.78	

=== Heat 2 ===
Rank	Athlete	Time	Notes
1	Alwin Houtsma (NED)	1:07.82	Q, PR
2	Janos Racz (HUN)	1:16.75	Q
3	Roman Kiselev (RUS)	1:17.43	Q
4	Chris Pugh (GBR)	1:17.86	Q
5	Murray Dingwall (GBR)	1:19.57	Q
6	Gunnar Orn Olafsson (ISL)	1:20.47	
7	Chris Hendy (GBR)	1:20.89	
8	Yung Wai-Yip (HKG)	1:22.53	

=== Final ===
Rank	Athlete	Time	Notes
1st place, gold medalist(s)	Alwin Houtsma (NED)	1:06.42	WR
2nd place, silver medalist(s)	Piotr Penar (POL)	1:16.87	
3rd place, bronze medalist(s)	Janos Racz (HUN)	1:16.99	
4	Roman Kiselev (RUS)	1:17.55	
5	Chris Pugh (GBR)	1:18.01	
6	Isaac Pavon (ESP)	1:19.10	
7	Murray Dingwall (GBR)	1:20.07	
	Stewart Pike (AUS)		DQ
