= Wheelchair tennis at the 2000 Summer Paralympics =

- Edition: 3rd
- Location: Sydney Olympic Park Tennis Centre

Champions

Men's singles
- (Australia) David Hall

Women's singles
- (Netherlands) Esther Vergeer

Men's doubles
- (Netherlands) Ricky Molier / Robin Ammerlaan

Women's doubles
- (Netherlands) Maaike Smit / Esther Vergeer
| ← 1996 · | Summer Paralympics | · 2004 → |

Paralympic symbol (1994-2004)

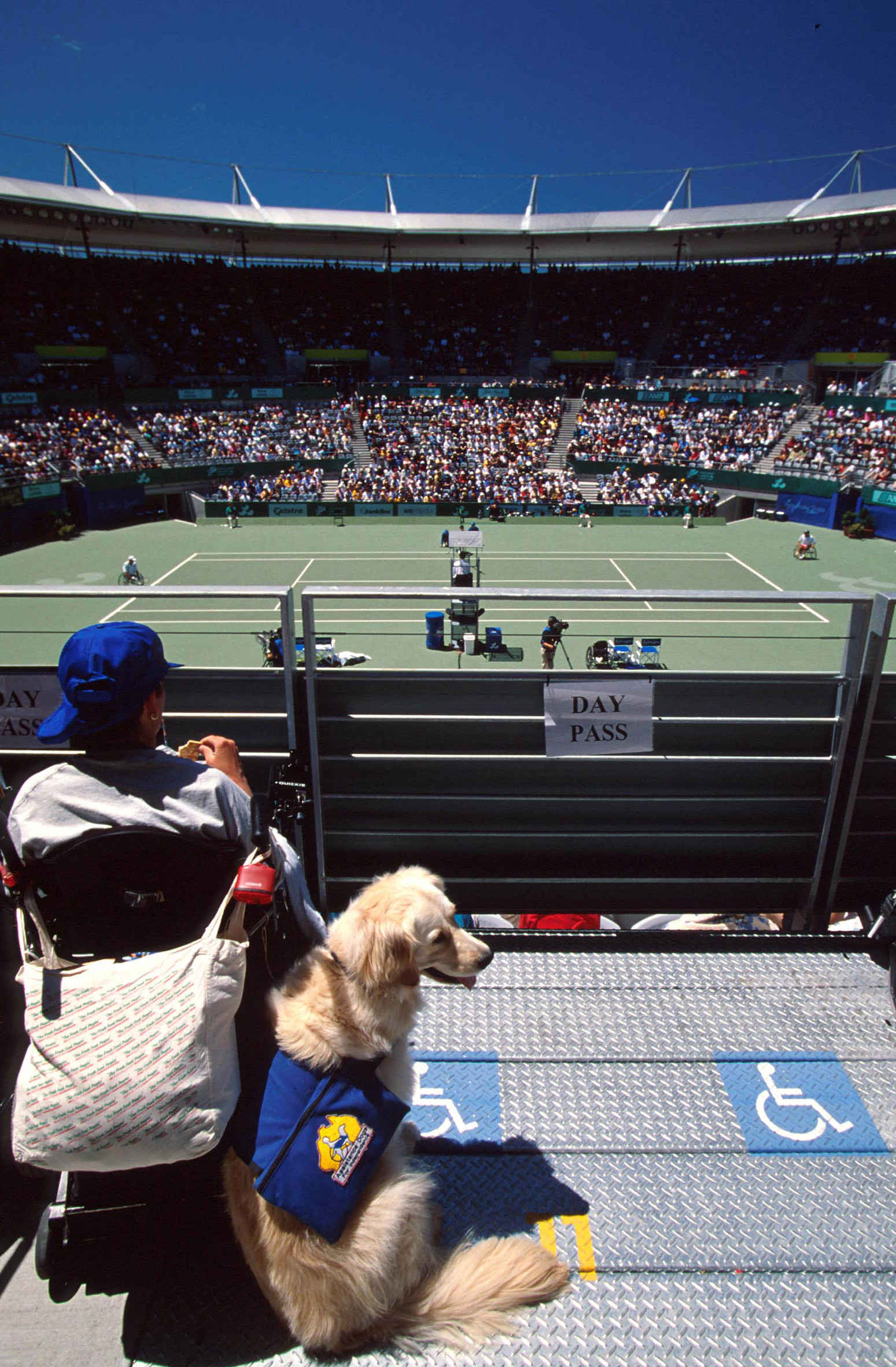
A spectator watches wheelchair tennis competition at the Olympic Tennis Arena with their disability assistance dog during the 2000 Summer Paralympics

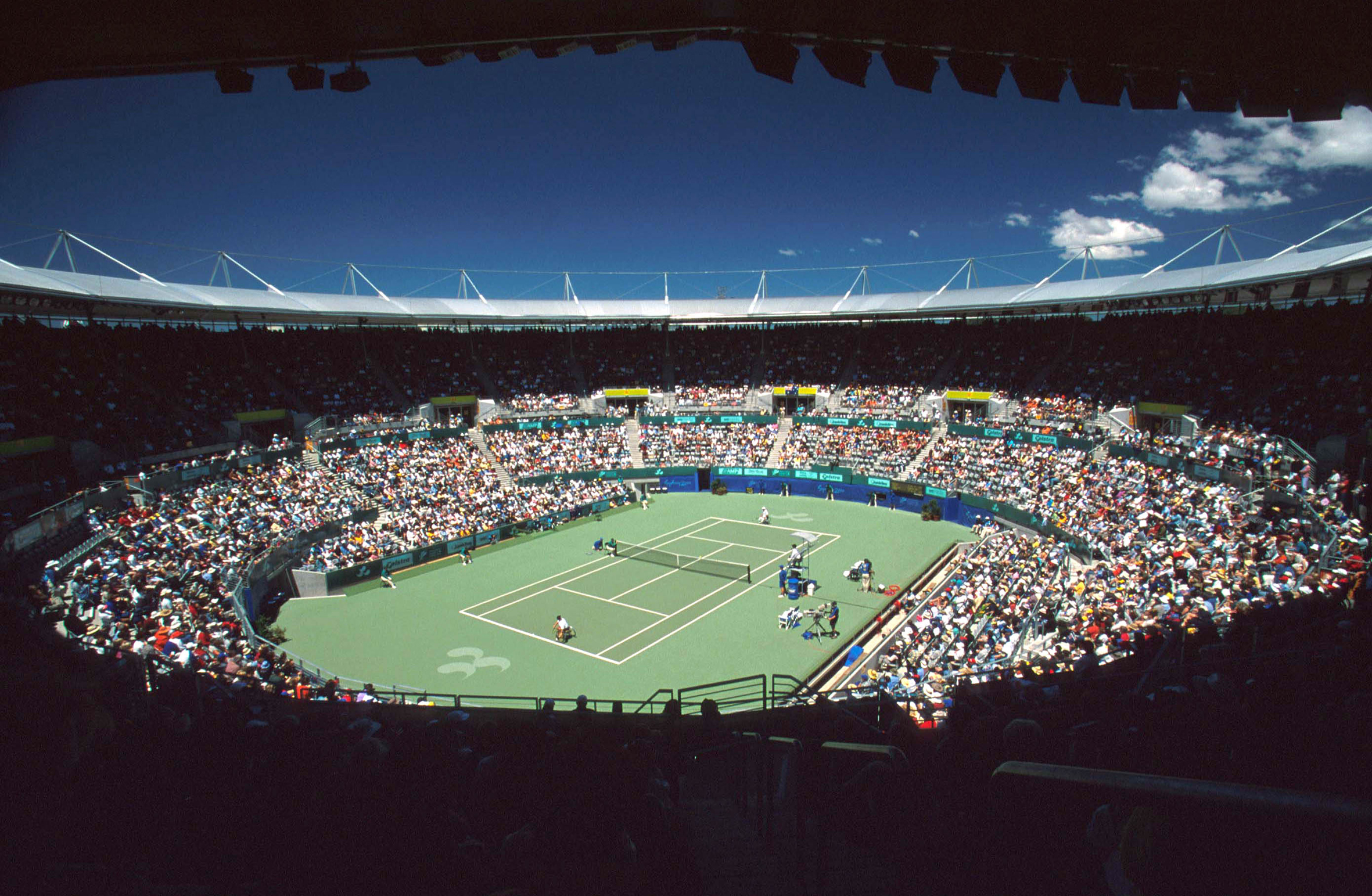
View from above of the venue for wheelchair tennis competition at the 2000 Summer Paralympics - the Olympic Tennis Arena

Wheelchair tennis at the 2000 Summer Paralympics consisted of doubles and singles competitions for men and women.

== Medal table ==
| Rank | Nation | Gold | Silver | Bronze | Total |
|---|---|---|---|---|---|
| 1 | Netherlands (NED) | 3 | 1 | 1 | 5 |
| 2 | Australia (AUS) | 1 | 2 | 0 | 3 |
| 3 | United States (USA) | 0 | 1 | 1 | 2 |
| 4 | Germany (GER) | 0 | 0 | 2 | 2 |
| Totals (4 entries) | | 4 | 4 | 4 | 12 |

=== Participating nations ===
- Argentina (1)
- Australia (4)
- Austria (2)
- Belgium (4)
- Canada (4)
- Chinese Taipei (2)
- France (3)
- Germany (5)
- Great Britain (5)
- Hungary (2)
- Israel (2)
- Italy (2)
- Japan (4)
- Mexico (2)
- Netherlands (7)
- New Zealand (2)
- Poland (2)
- Russia (1)
- South Korea (2)
- Spain (2)
- Sweden (2)
- Switzerland (2)
- Thailand (4)
- United States (6)

== Medallists ==
| Event | Gold | Silver | Bronze |
|---|---|---|---|
| Men's singles | David Hall; Australia | Stephen Welch; United States | Kai Schramayer; Germany |
| Men's doubles | Netherlands (NED); Ricky Molier; Robin Ammerlaan | Australia (AUS); David Johnson; David Hall | United States (USA); Stephen Welch; Scott Douglas |
| Women's singles | Esther Vergeer; Netherlands | Sharon Walraven; Netherlands | Maaike Smit; Netherlands |
| Women's doubles | Netherlands (NED); Maaike Smit; Esther Vergeer | Australia (AUS); Branka Pupovac; Daniela Di Toro | Germany (GER); Christine Otterbach; Petra Sax-Scharl |

Source: Paralympic.org
