= Houtsma =

Houtsma is a Dutch surname. Notable people with the surname include:

- Alwin Houtsma (fl. 1996–2000), Dutch Paralympic swimmer
- Martijn Theodoor Houtsma (1851–1943), Dutch orientalist and professor
