= Wheelchair tennis at the 1996 Summer Paralympics – Men's doubles =

Wheelchair tennis – Men's doubles at the X Paralympic Games
- Paralympic wheelchair tennis
- Dates: 16–25 August 1996

Medalists
1st place, gold medalist(s)		Stephen Welch; Vance Parmelly	United States
2nd place, silver medalist(s)		David Hall; Mick Connell	Australia
3rd place, bronze medalist(s)		Eric Stuurman; Ricky Molier	Netherlands

Men's doubles
- Wheelchair tennis at the 1996 Summer Paralympics

Events
Singles	men	women
Doubles	men	women
- Summer Paralympics

The men's doubles wheelchair tennis competition at the 1996 Summer Paralympics in Atlanta from 16 August until 25 August.

== Draw ==
=== Key ===
- INV = Bipartite invitation
- IP = ITF place
- ALT = Alternate
- r = Retired
- w/o = Walkover

=== Finals ===
Semifinals
Stephen Welch (USA); Vance Parmelly (USA)	6	6
Abde Naili (FRA); Laurent Giammartini (FRA)	3	1
Eric Stuurman (NED); Ricky Molier (NED)	6	1
David Hall (AUS); Mick Connell (AUS)	7	6

Final (gold medal match)
Stephen Welch (USA); Vance Parmelly (USA)	6	3	7
David Hall (AUS); Mick Connell (AUS)	2	6	6
Bronze medal match
Abde Naili (FRA); Laurent Giammartini (FRA)	DNF
Eric Stuurman (NED); Ricky Molier (NED)

==== Top half ====
Round of 32
C Lim (KOR); D Huh (KOR)	6	6
S Rattanasang (THA); J Yodyangdang (THA)	0	2
M Niinmaki (FIN); J Juntenen (FIN)	1	4
Y Ohmori (JPN); S Saida (JPN)	6	6
J Haglund (SWE); J Larsson (SWE)	6	3	6
E Sartov (ISR); G Naor (ISR)	2	6	7

Round of 16
S Welch (USA); V Parmelly (USA)	6	6
C Lim (KOR); D Huh (KOR)	1	1
M Perron (CAN); P Johnson (CAN)	3	5
C Illingworth (GBR); L Mistry (GBR)	6	7
A Naili (FRA); L Giammartini (FRA)	6	6
Y Ohmori (JPN); S Saida (JPN)	1	3
E Sartov (ISR); G Naor (ISR)	1	2
K Salzmann (AUT); M Legner (AUT)	6	6

Quarterfinals
S Welch (USA); V Parmelly (USA)	6	7
C Illingworth (GBR); L Mistry (GBR)	0	6
A Naili (FRA); L Giammartini (FRA)	6	7
K Salzmann (AUT); M Legner (AUT)	4	6

Semifinals
S Welch (USA); V Parmelly (USA)	6	6
A Naili (FRA); L Giammartini (FRA)	3	1

==== Bottom half ====
Round of 32
C Rigolo (ITA); M Porciani (ITA)	7	6
V Demenko (RUS); L Shevchick (RUS)	5	3
J Ros (ESP); J Ramos (ESP)	3	0
T Kruszelnicki (POL); P Jaroszewski (POL)	6	6
R Avila (MEX); R Corona (MEX)	6	6
L Farkas (HUN); S Navratyil (HUN)	2	1

Round of 16
T Purschke (GER); S Bitterauf (GER)	6	6
C Rigolo (ITA); M Porciani (ITA)	1	3
T Kruszelnicki (POL); P Jaroszewski (POL)	4	5
E Stuurman (NED); R Molier (NED)	6	7
G Metroz (SUI); M Erni (SUI)	6	6
F Reis Junior (BRA); JC Morais (BRA)	3	2
R Avila (MEX); R Corona (MEX)	1	0
D Hall (AUS); M Connell (AUS)	6	6

Quarterfinals
T Purschke (GER); S Bitterauf (GER)	6	3
E Stuurman (NED); R Molier (NED)	7	6
G Metroz (SUI); M Erni (SUI)	0	0
D Hall (AUS); M Connell (AUS)	6	6

Semifinals
E Stuurman (NED); R Molier (NED)	6	1
D Hall (AUS); M Connell (AUS)	7	6
