= Vance Parmelly =

American wheelchair tennis player

Sport
- Country: United States
- Sport: Wheelchair tennis
Medal record
Paralympic Games
Gold medal – first place	1996 Atlanta	Men's doubles

Vance Parmelly is an American wheelchair tennis player. He represented the United States at the 1996 Summer Paralympics in Atlanta, Georgia, United States.

Parmelly and Stephen Welch won the gold medal in the men's doubles event at the 1996 Summer Paralympics.

He also competed in the men's singles event where he reached the quarterfinals.
