= Christine Otterbach =

German wheelchair tennis player

Sport
- Country: Germany
- Sport: Wheelchair tennis
Medal record
Paralympic Games
Bronze medal – third place	2000 Sydney	Women's doubles

Christine Otterbach is a German wheelchair tennis player. She represented Germany at the 2000 Summer Paralympics held in Sydney, Australia and she won the bronze medal in the women's doubles event together with Petra Sax-Scharl. She also competed in the women's singles event where she was eliminated in the first match.
