= Karni Liddell =

Australian Paralympic swimmer (born 1979)

Personal information
- Nationality: Australia
- Born: 1 March 1979 (age 47) Rockhampton, Queensland
Medal record
Swimming
Paralympic Games
Bronze medal – third place	1996 Atlanta	Women's 50 m Freestyle S6
Bronze medal – third place	2000 Sydney	Women's 4x50 m Freestyle 20 pts
IPC Swimming World Championships
Silver medal – second place	1998 Christchurch	Women's 4 x 50 m Freestyle Open

Karni Liddell (born 1 March 1979) is a Paralympic swimming competitor from Australia.

== Personal ==
Liddell was born on 1 March 1979 in Rockhampton, Queensland. She is a radio presenter for 4BC.

At twelve months old, Liddell was diagnosed with Spinal Muscular Atrophy a rare neuromuscular wasting disease. Karni was misdiagnosed for 40 years and has recently been diagnosed with Congenital Titinopathy which is also a neuromuscular wasting disease. Karni was diagnosed via a whole genome sequencing test performed in Europe in 2019 and Karni and her family had been looking for a diagnosis for the past 12 years and this has been a lengthy, traumatic and expensive process for her family. Her parents were told by doctors that she would never be able to walk and that she would not live past her teens.

Liddell, alongside Branka Pupovac, Hamish MacDonald and Charmaine Dalli, was one of eighteen Australian Paralympians photographed by Emma Hack for a nude calendar. Liddell's photography depicts her wearing sunglasses and a covered in body paint made to look like a polka-dotted bikini. In 2008, she was one of several Queenslanders to have their images painted by Ludmila Clark to have the picture go on display at the Customs House in Rockhampton.

== Swimming ==
By the age of 14, Liddell had broken a swimming world record. She has competed at two Paralympic Games: 1996 and 2000. She won medals at both Games and was the Australian Swimming Team Captain at the Sydney 2000 Paralympic Games.
