= Gérald Métroz =

- Full name: Gérald Roger Métroz
- Country (sports): Switzerland
- Born: 16 May 1962 (age 63) Martigny, Switzerland
- Plays: Right-handed
- Official website: Gérald Métroz's Website

Singles
- Highest ranking: No. 22 (31 August 1993)

Doubles
- Highest ranking: No. 9 (06 September 1994)
- Last updated on: 17 October 2012.

Gérald Roger Métroz (born 16 May 1962 in Martigny) is a journalist, sports consultant, writer, and columnist.

== Early life ==
Métroz lost both of his legs in 1964 when he was hit by a train when he was at the train station of his hometown.

== Paralympics ==
Métroz participated in the 1996 Paralympic Games in Atlanta. He played in the Men's Doubles and the Men's Singles. In the doubles he played with Martin Erni and made it to the quarter-finals.

== Other work ==
Métroz is also a public speaker at presentations and conferences and the founder of the company Gérald Métroz Sports Consulting.

== Books ==
- "Soudain un train", Jacques Briod, Editions Autrement (Paris, 2001), German translation "Ich lass mich nicht behindern", Jacques Briod, Scherz Verlag (2002)
- "La Vie d'en bas", Gerald Metroz, Editions Empiric Vision (Martigny, 2019) ISBN 9782839927758

== Films ==
- Gérald Métroz - Elle est pas belle, la vie? by Jean-François Amiguet (2006)
