= Gertrudis Laemers =

Dutch para table tennis player

Sport
- Country: Netherlands
- Sport: Para table tennis

Gertrudis Laemers is a Dutch para table tennis player. She represented the Netherlands at the 1996 Summer Paralympics and at the 2000 Summer Paralympics and in total she won two bronze medals.

In 1996, she won the bronze medal in the Women's Singles 4 event. In 2000, she won the bronze medal in the Women's Teams 1-3 event together with Jolanda Paardekam.
