= Wheelchair tennis at the 1996 Summer Paralympics – Men's singles =

Wheelchair tennis – Men's singles at the X Paralympic Games
- Paralympic wheelchair tennis
- Dates: 16–25 August 1996
- Competitors: 46

Medalists
1st place, gold medalist(s)		Ricky Molier	Netherlands
2nd place, silver medalist(s)		Stephen Welch	United States
3rd place, bronze medalist(s)		David Hall	Australia

Men's singles
- Wheelchair tennis at the 1996 Summer Paralympics

Events
Singles	men	women
Doubles	men	women
- Summer Paralympics

The men's singles wheelchair tennis competition at the 1996 Summer Paralympics in Atlanta from 16 August until 25 August.

The Netherlands' Ricky Molier defeated the United States' Stephen Welch in the final, 7–6, 6–2 to win the gold medal in men's singles wheelchair tennis at the 1996 Atlanta Paralympics. In the bronze medal match, Australia's David Hall defeated France's Laurent Giammartini.

The United States' Randy Snow was the reigning gold medalist, but competed in wheelchair basketball instead.

== Draw ==
=== Key ===
- INV = Bipartite invitation
- IP = ITF place
- ALT = Alternate
- r = Retired
- w/o = Walkover

=== Finals ===
Quarterfinals
Laurent Giammartini (FRA)	6	1	7
James Black (USA)	2	6	5
Stephen Welch (USA)	6	6
Torsten Purschke (GER)	2	1
Abde Naili (FRA)	2	6	3
Ricky Molier (NED)	6	4	6
Vance Parmelly (USA)	5	5
David Hall (AUS)	7	7

Semifinals
Laurent Giammartini (FRA)	1	1
Stephen Welch (USA)	6	6
Ricky Molier (NED)	6	7	7
David Hall (AUS)	7	5	5

Final (gold medal match)
Stephen Welch (USA)	6	2
Ricky Molier (NED)	7	6
Bronze medal match
Laurent Giammartini (FRA)	3	0
David Hall (AUS)	6	6

=== Top half ===
==== Section 1 ====
Round of 64
J Juntenen (FIN)	0	2
M Connell (AUS)	6	6
M Porciani (ITA)	2	2
P Johnson (CAN)	6	6
J Tempest (SWE)	6	6
S Navratyil (HUN)	2	2
P Jaroszewski (POL)	7	6
J Yodyangdang (THA)	5	3

Round of 32
L Giammartini (FRA)	6	4	6
M Connell (AUS)	2	6	3
P Johnson (CAN)	2	0
J Mistry (GBR)	6	6
K Salzmann (AUT)	3	6	7
J Larsson (SWE)	6	3	6
P Jaroszewski (POL)	0	0
J Black (USA)	6	6

Round of 16
L Giammartini (FRA)	6	6
J Mistry (GBR)	2	0
K Salzmann (AUT)	2	3
J Black (USA)	6	6

Quarterfinals
L Giammartini (FRA)	6	1	7
J Black (USA)	2	6	5

==== Section 2 ====
Round of 64
J Ros (ESP)	2	0
Y Ohmori (JPN)	6	6
JC Morais (BRA)	1	0
Y Albespy (FRA)	6	6
L Shevchick (RUS)	6	4
M Erni (SUI)	7	6

Round of 32
S Welch (USA)	6	6
Y Ohmori (JPN)	1	0
Y Albespy (FRA)	1	4
E Stuurman (NED)	6	6
T Purschke (GER)	6	6
M Erni (SUI)	1	0
R Avila (MEX)	0	3
E Sartov (ISR)	6	6

Round of 16
S Welch (USA)	6	6
E Stuurman (NED)	3	3
T Purschke (GER)	6	2	6
E Sartov (ISR)	0	6	4

Quarterfinals
S Welch (USA)	6	6
T Purschke (GER)	2	1

=== Bottom half ===
==== Section 1 ====
Round of 64
C Rigolo (ITA)	7	7
M Niinmaki (FIN)	5	5
R Corona (MEX)	4	5
L Farkas (HUN)	6	7
V Demenko (RUS)	1	1
G Naor (ISR)	6	6
S Rattanasang (THA)	0	0
R Weisang (GER)	6	6

Round of 32
M Legner (AUT)	6	6
C Rigolo (ITA)	0	0
L Farkas (HUN)	1	2
A Naili (FRA)	6	6
S Douglas (USA)	6	6
G Naor (ISR)	0	0
R Weisang (GER)	2	3
R Molier (NED)	6	6

Round of 16
M Legner (AUT)	3	3
A Naili (FRA)	6	6
S Douglas (USA)	4	2
R Molier (NED)	6	6

Quarterfinals
A Naili (FRA)	2	6	3
R Molier (NED)	6	4	6

==== Section 2 ====
Round of 64
G Metroz (SUI)	6	6
D Huh (KOR)	2	2
T Kruszelnicki (POL)	2	0
C Illingworth (GBR)	6	6
M Perron (CAN)	2	7	3
S Saida (JPN)	6	6	6

Round of 32
V Parmelly (USA)	6	3	6
G Metroz (SUI)	2	6	3
C Illingworth (GBR)	1	6	1
J Haglund (SWE)	6	3	6
S Bitterauf (GER)	6	6
F Reis Junior (BRA)	2	2
S Saida (JPN)	2	1
D Hall (AUS)	6	6

Round of 16
V Parmelly (USA)	6	6
J Haglund (SWE)	3	2
S Bitterauf (GER)	6	1
D Hall (AUS)	7	6

Quarterfinals
V Parmelly (USA)	5	5
D Hall (AUS)	7	7
