= Hamish MacDonald (athlete) =

Australian Paralympic athlete

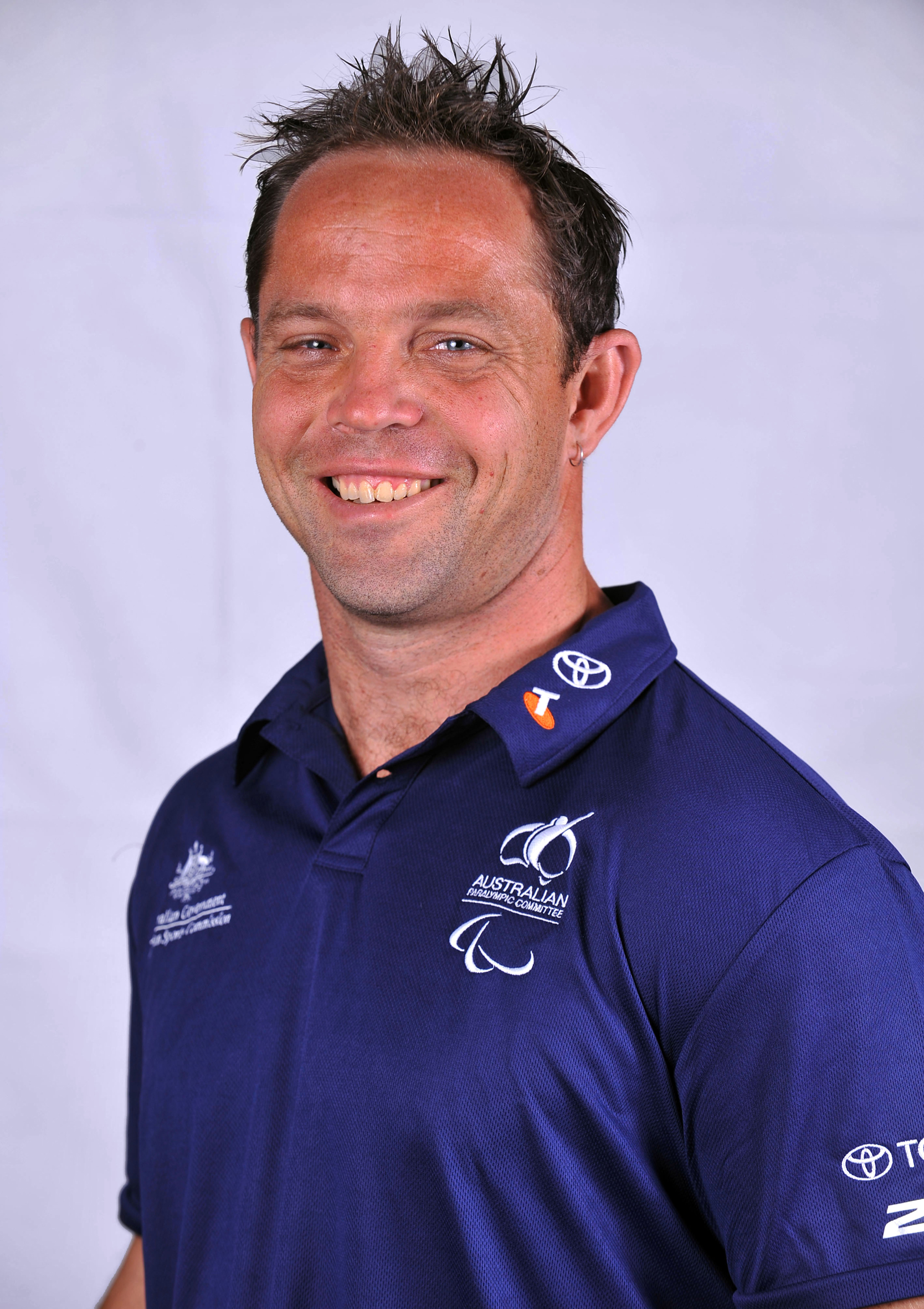
- 2012 Australian Paralympic team portrait of MacDonald

Personal information
- Full name: Hamish Anderson MacDonald
- Nationality: Australian
- Born: 19 August 1974 (age 52) Melbourne, Victoria, Australia
- Height: 170 cm (5 ft 7 in)
- Weight: 80 kg (176 lb)

Sport
- Country: Australia
- Sport: Para athletics
Medal record
Paralympic Games
Gold medal – first place	1996 Atlanta	Men's shot put F32–33
Silver medal – second place	2004 Athens	Men's shot put F32–33
World Championships
Gold medal – first place	2002 Lille	Men's shot put F34
Gold medal – first place	2006 Assen	Men's shot put F34
Bronze medal – third place	1998 Birmingham	Men's shot put F34
Commonwealth Games
Bronze medal – third place	2010 Delhi	Men's shot put F32/34/52

Hamish Anderson MacDonald, OAM (born 19 August 1974) is an Australian Paralympic athlete. He was born in Melbourne and lives in Canberra. He has cerebral palsy. His achievements and advocacy have made him one of Australia's most respected Paralympians.

== Early life ==
MacDonald, the second of four brothers, grew up in Melbourne. His mother, Jeannie, a nurse, ensured that he had the same opportunities in sport as his brothers. While in primary school, he was required to catch a train into the city twice a week for physiotherapy. MacDonald did not walk without callipers until he was eight.

MacDonald has stated that several teachers have played a pivotal role in his interest in sport. In primary school, his physical education teacher Gary Cole, an Australia international soccer player gave support and enthusiasm. In 1986, his family moved to Alice Springs and physical education teachers Shane Claridge and Michelle Parker, at Alice Springs High School, provided encouragement. He said: "They were the best teachers; they certainly gave me a big boost and helped to set my sights on track and field sports." He started powerlifting and wanted to compete in this sport at the Paralympics. However, Parker encouraged him to turn to athletics and in his final year at high school, he was selected for the Barcelona Paralympics.

== Career ==
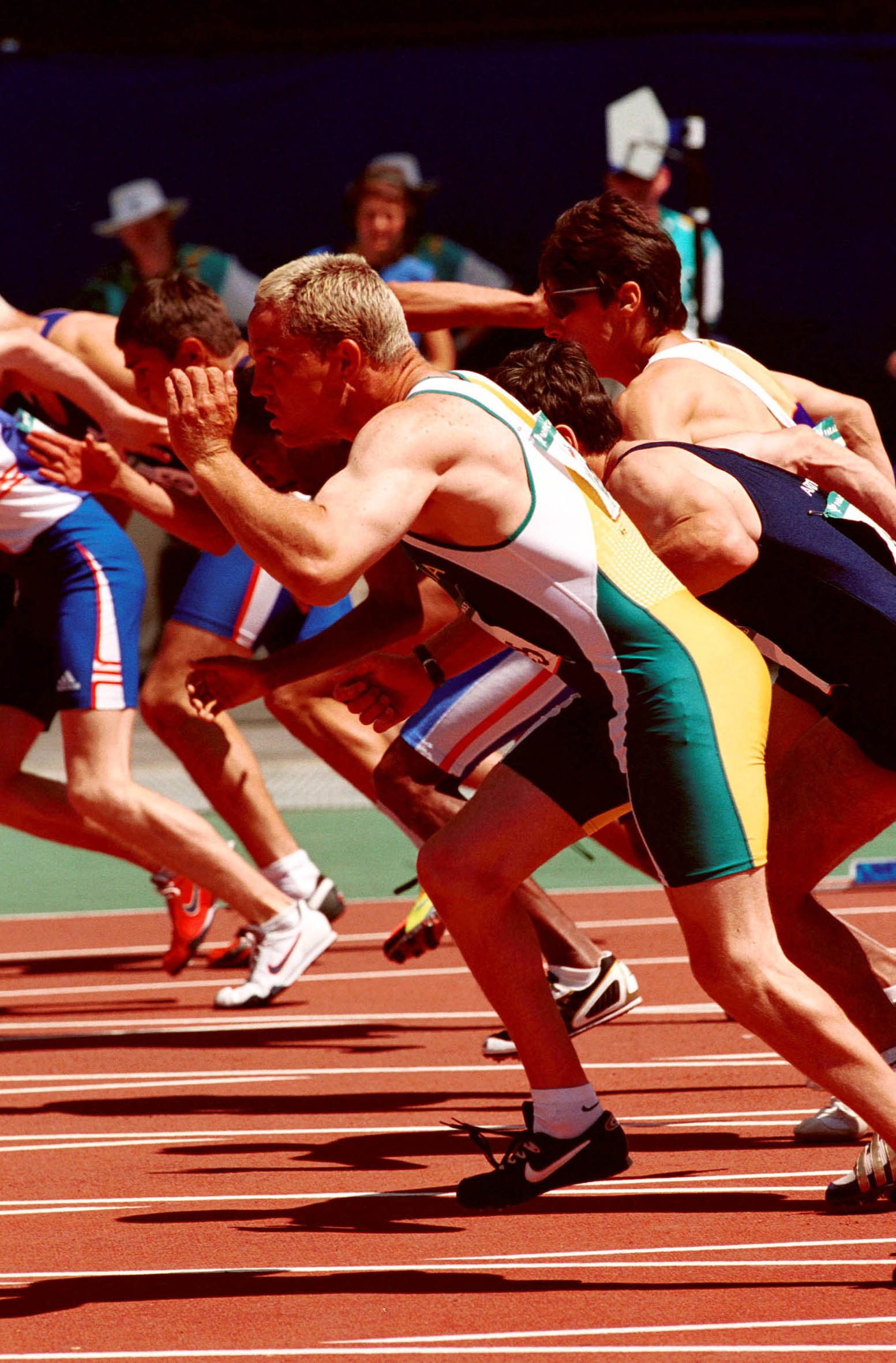
Action shot of MacDonald (seen foreground, in Australian green and gold) during race competition at the 2000 Summer Paralympics

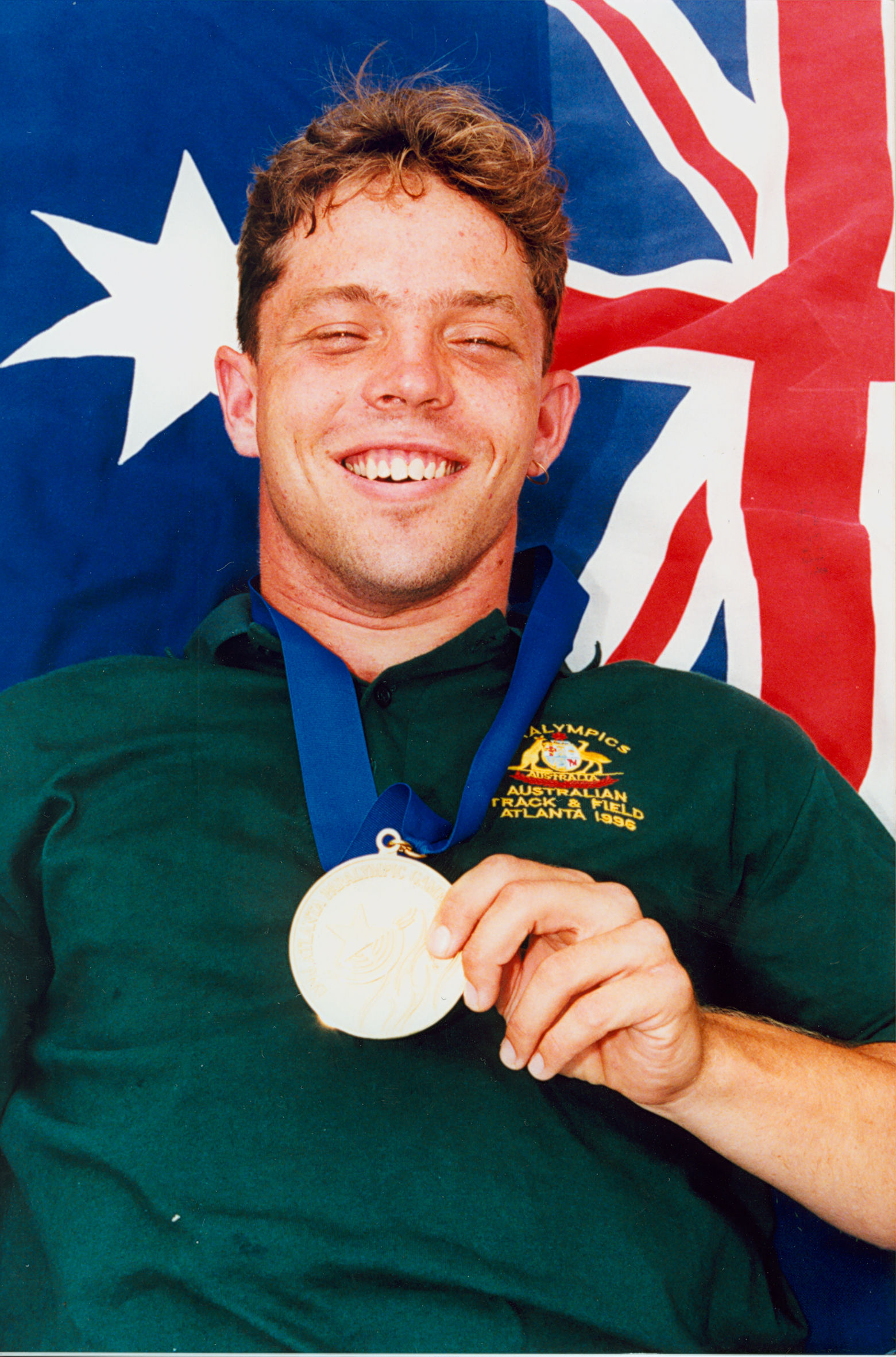
MacDonald in August 2008 showing his 1996 gold medal in shot put

MacDonald was an elite seated shot putter and competed at the Paralympic Games in Barcelona 1992, Atlanta 1996, Sydney 2000, Athens 2004, Beijing 2008 and London 2012.

At the 1992 Barcelona Games, he competed in the men's 100m C5 and 200m C5-6 without winning any medals. In the lead up to the Barcelona Games, the people of Alice Springs raised $12,000 for him to compete. In 1994, he accepted an Australian Institute of Sport (AIS) Athletes with a Disability residential scholarship in Canberra. He held this scholarship until 2009 and during this period was coached by Chris Nunn, Scott Goodman and Alison O'Riordan. After six months at the Australian Institute of Sport, he was strongly encouraged to switch to throwing events due to rapidly increasing standards in Paralympic sprinting and his powerlifting background. He had unsuccessfully tried throwing events in Little Athletics because of difficulties staying in the throwing circle due to poor balance. His functional classification allowed him to throw from a chair and he subsequently won a gold medal at the 1996 Atlanta Games in the men's shot put F32–33 event, in a world record. He was awarded a Medal of the Order of Australia for this achievement.

MacDonald faced a difficult build up to the 2000 Sydney Games. He was going into Sydney as the defending champion but he did not meet the requirements to be classified as an F56 shot put athlete. He competed in his less preferred events, the Men's 100m T35 and Men's Discus F34. The controversy highlighted the issues of classifying athletes.

At the 2004 Athens Games, he won a silver medal in the men's shot put F32–33 event. At the 2008 Games, he finished sixth in the men's shot put F33/34/52 event. At his sixth and final Games, the 2012 London Games, he finished 11th in the men's shot put F34.

MacDonald competed at five successive IPC Athletics World Championships from 1994 to 2011. In 1994, he competed in 100m, 200m and 400m T35 events. In 1998, he won a bronze medal in men's shot put F34 and competed in men's 100m and 200m T35 events. There was controversy during the men's shot put where MacDonald was forced to change his technique mid-competition due to an official's ignorance of the rules. In 2002, he won gold in the men's shot put F34 in a world record (10.69m) and competed in men's discus F33–34. In 2006, he won gold in the men's shot put F34 event and competed in the men's discus F33–34 event. In 2011, he finished 6th in men's shot put F34.

At the 2010 Delhi Commonwealth Games, he won a bronze medal in the men's shot put F32/34/52.

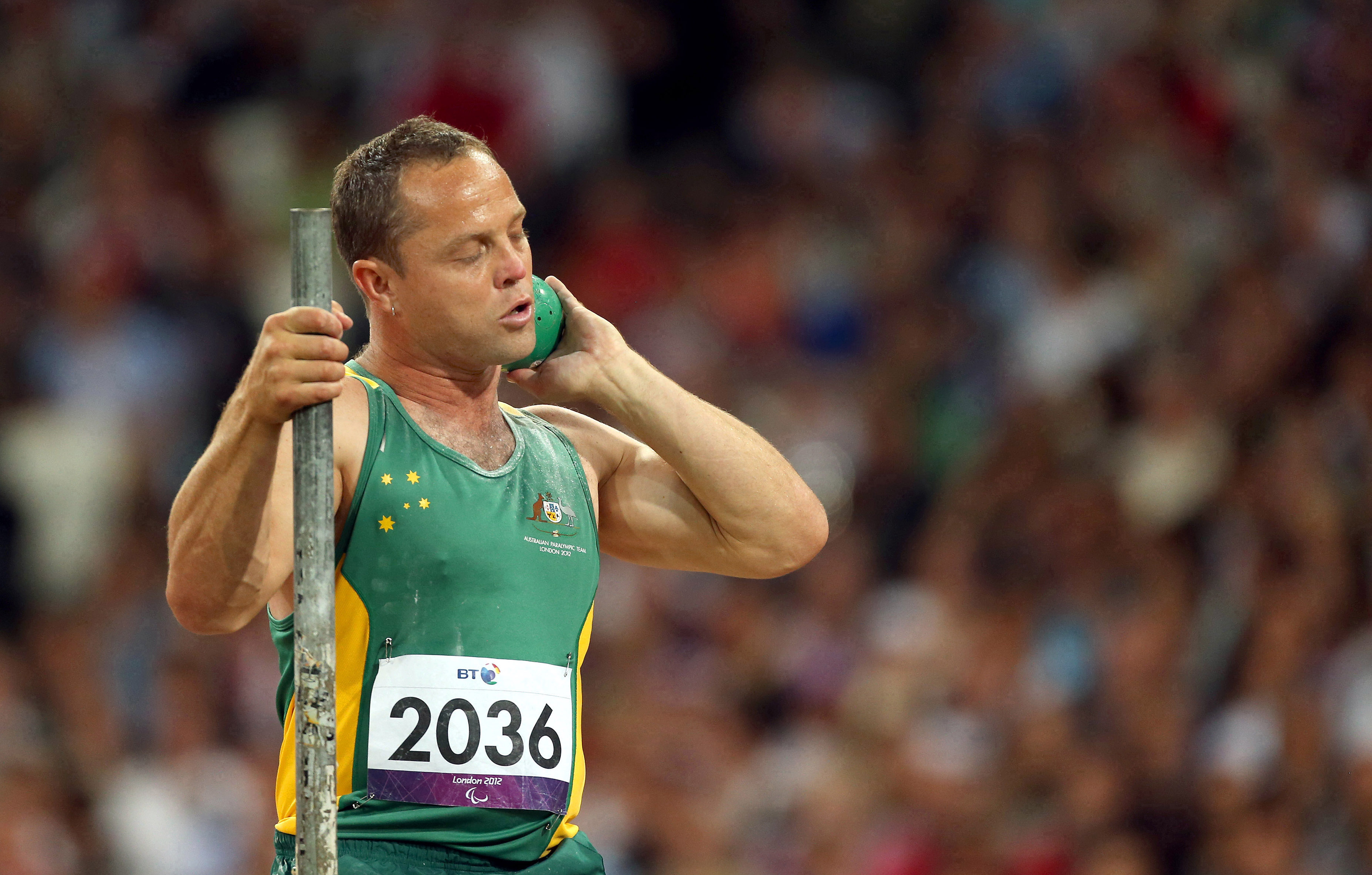
MacDonald during the shout put at the 2012 London Paralympics

In 2005, MacDonald was recognised by the AIS for being on scholarship for ten years. He has also held a Northern Territory Institute of Sport scholarship.

He retired as an athlete in January 2013. Jason Hellwig, CEO of the Australian Paralympic Committee made the following comment on his retirement – "I've known Hamish a long time through my involvement with athletics and have seen him develop as an athlete and a person. It's been great to watch a kid from Alice Springs rise to the heights of international sport and then contribute in such a meaningful way." MacDonald indicated that he would most likely remain involved in Paralympic sport as a coach.

== Coaching ==
In 2015, he was coaching Jayden Sawyer and Kath Proudfoot in Canberra. He was selected as a throws coach for the Australian team competing at the 2015 IPC Athletics World Championships.

== Advocacy ==
MacDonald is an advocate for disabled sport, and travels the world to do this. He has visited the South Pacific and Caribbean to help create local disabled sport programs. He has been involved with the International Paralympic Committee as a member of the International Paralympic Committee Athlete Commission. In 1998, he became involved with the United Nations High Commission for Refugees (UNHCR). With the UNHCR, he visited two refugee camps located on the border between Thailand and Cambodia. At the 2003 South Pacific Games, he was an athlete ambassador for the World Anti-Doping Agency.

MacDonald's work as a sports participation advisor at the Australian Sports Commission has led to several initiatives to educate people, raise awareness and change peoples' understandings regarding disability sport.

I grew up with cerebral palsy and didn't have any other reality; I really take off my hat to the Paralympians who have had to overcome tremendous lifestyle change because of often horrendous injury. My role models are the people who have overcome grievous injuries to excel in sport, and through sport, to excel in life.

— Hamish MacDonald

== Recognition ==
- He received a Medal of the Order of Australia in 1997.
- In 2000, he received an Australian Sports Medal.
- He was 1996 Northern Territory Sportsman of the Year.
- He was named Male Disability Athlete of the Year by the Australian Paralympic Committee in 2003.
- He was awarded the 1999 Sir Edward 'Weary' Dunlop Award by the Queen's Trust for Young Australians.
- He was Australian Capital Territory Athletics Most Outstanding Athlete in 2005. He was the first athlete with a disability to win this award.
- He was the co-captain of the Australian teams at the 1998 IPC Athletics World Championships and the 2000 Sydney Paralympic Games.
- Australian Paralympic Committee board member 2001–2002
- He was an Australian flag bearer at the 2011 IPC Athletics World Championships opening ceremony.

MacDonald, alongside Branka Pupovac, Karni Liddell and Charmaine Dalli, was one of eighteen Australian Paralympians photographed by Emma Hack for a nude calendar. His chest was shaved for the photograph and he appears nude from the waist up.

In 2000, MacDonald and fellow Paralympian Julianne Adams addressed the New South Wales Legislative Assembly, thanking the people of New South Wales for their support of the Sydney Paralympics.
