= Netherlands at the 2000 Summer Paralympics =

- Flag of the Netherlands
- IPC code: NED
- NPC: Nederlands Olympisch Comité * Nederlandse Sport Federatie
- Website: paralympisch.nl (in Dutch)

in Sydney
- Competitors: 102 (69 men and 33 women)
- Medals Ranked 15th: Gold 12 Silver 9 Bronze 9 Total 30

Summer Paralympics appearances (overview)
- 1960; 1964; 1968; 1972; 1976; 1980; 1984; 1988; 1992; 1996; 2000; 2004; 2008; 2012; 2016; 2020; 2024

Netherlands competed at the 2000 Summer Paralympics in Sydney, Australia. The team included 102 athletes, 69 men and 33 women. Competitors from Netherlands won 30 medals, including 12 gold, 9 silver and 9 bronze to finish 15th in the medal table.

== Medalists ==
Medal	Name	Sport	Event
Gold	Jan Mulder; Jeroen Straathof	Cycling	Men's Individual Pursuit Tandem open
Gold	Joop Stokkel	Equestrian	Mixed Dressage - Championship grade II
Gold	Alwin Houtsma	Swimming	Men's 100 m Breaststroke SB14
Gold	Kasper Engel	Swimming	Men's 100 m Breaststroke SB5
Gold	Alwin Houtsma	Swimming	Men's 100 m Freestyle S14
Gold	Alwin Houtsma	Swimming	Men's 200 m Medley SM14
Gold	Alwin Houtsma	Swimming	Men's 50 m Butterfly S14
Gold	Alwin Houtsma	Swimming	Men's 50 m Freestyle S14
Gold	Syreeta van Amelsvoort	Swimming	Women's 100 m Butterfly S8
Gold	Robin Ammerlaan; Ricky Molier	Wheelchair tennis	Men's Doubles
Gold	Maaike Smit; Esther Vergeer	Wheelchair tennis	Women's Doubles
Gold	Esther Vergeer	Wheelchair tennis	Women's Singles
Silver	Willem Noorduin	Athletics	Men's Discus F36
Silver	Willem Noorduin	Athletics	Men's Shot Put F36
Silver	Jan Mulder; Pascal Schoots	Cycling	Men's Tandem open
Silver	Joop Stokkel	Equestrian	Mixed Dressage - Freestyle grade II
Silver	Gert Bolmer; Ineke de Groot; Joop Stokkel; Sjerstin Vermeulen	Equestrian	Mixed Dressage Team open
Silver	Alwin Houtsma	Swimming	Men's 200 m Freestyle S14
Silver	Jeroen Gottemaker; Alwin Houtsma; Marcel Kamst; Jeroen van Oene	Swimming	Men's 4x50 m Medley S14
Silver	Netherlands men's wheelchair basketball team: Wim t Lam; Frank de Goede; Anton de Rooy; Ruud Dettmer; Koen Jansens; Mustafa Jebari; Rene Martens; Marion Oosterbosch; Kees van de Bunte; Gert Jan van der Linden; Kornelis van der Werf; Arie van Gent	Wheelchair basketball	Men's team
Silver	Sharon Walraven	Wheelchair tennis	Women's Singles
Bronze	Gert Bolmer	Equestrian	Mixed Dressage - Freestyle grade II
Bronze	Taqy Parnian	Powerlifting	Men's Up To 60 kg
Bronze	Alwin Houtsma	Swimming	Men's 100 m Backstroke S14
Bronze	Jurjen Engelsman	Swimming	Men's 200 m Medley SM10
Bronze	Joost de Hoogh	Swimming	Men's 400 m Freestyle S10
Bronze	Mendy Meenderink	Swimming	Women's 100 m Freestyle S9
Bronze	Marion Nijhof	Swimming	Women's 400 m Freestyle S11
Bronze	Gertrudis Laemers; Jolanda Paardekam	Table tennis	Women's Teams 1-3
Bronze	Maaike Smit	Wheelchair tennis	Women's Singles

Source: www.paralympic.org & www.olympischstadion.nl

== See also ==
- Netherlands at the Paralympics
- Netherlands at the 2000 Summer Olympics
