= Diane Rakiecki =

Canadian multi-sport athlete

Personal information
- National team: Canada
- Born: October 22, 1961 (age 64) Penticton, British Columbia, Canada
- Education: University of British Columbia
- Occupation: School teacher

Sport
- Country: Canada
- Sport: Wheelchair racing; Wheelchair basketball; Wheelchair tennis
- Disability: Paraplegia
- Disability class: Class 4
Medal record
Women's Wheelchair basketball
Representing Canada
Paralympic Games
Gold medal – first place	1992 Barcelona	Women's wheelchair basketball

Diane Rakiecki (born October 22, 1961) is a Canadian Class 4 wheelchair racer, wheelchair basketball player and wheelchair tennis player who competed in the Paralympic Games and the World Athletics Championships. She won medals in national and regional Canadian wheelchair championships and the World Wheelchair Games. Rakiecki won the women's exhibition 800 metres wheelchair competition at the 1987 World Championships in Athletics in Rome and helped the Canada women's national wheelchair basketball team to win the bronze medal at the 1990 Wheelchair Basketball World Championship in France and the gold medal in the women's wheelchair basketball tournament at the 1992 Summer Paralympics in Barcelona. She finished second in the first ever officially recognized women's handcycle race of the New York City Marathon at the 2000 edition.

== Personal background ==
She was born in Penticton, British Columbia, on October 22, 1961. At the age of 15, Rakiecki and an impaired driver of another automobile were involved in a May 22, 1977 early morning vehicle head-on accident in Kelowna, British Columbia that left her spinal cord severed, leaving her a paraplegic from the hips down and unable to walk and her father Stefan dead. There were no other injured occupants, and the impaired driver was sentenced to one year in prison for criminal negligence. She spent the following ten months in rehabilitation at G. F. Strong Centre in Vancouver.

Rakiecki had done Grade 10, but finished her secondary education in 1981 through correspondence, due to her friends treating her differently following the accident. She undertook a university transfer program at Kelowna's Okanagan College. Rakiecki graduated from the University of British Columbia with a four-year physical education degree in 1986, which she augmented with a teaching diploma the following year. She thus became the first female in a wheelchair to graduate from the university with a physical education degree. Rakiecki played basketball with the Vancouver Cablecars and did racquetball. She is a qualified elementary school teacher.

== Career ==
She had endeavoured to be either a nurse of physiotherapist prior to her crash but took up wheelchair field sports instead; she had not considered an athletic career before that. Rakiecki switched to track and won the women's 200 metres event at the 1979 National Wheelchair Championships in Vancouver. In 1980, Rakiecki claimed six track and field gold medals and established new Canadian records in her victories in the women's 60, 100, 200, 400, 800 and 1500 metres events. The following year, she participated in the B.C. Games for the Physically Disabled in Kelowna. Rakiecki won the women's Class 4 800 metres and set new Canadian records in the 400 and 1500 metres competitions. Later that year at the Canadian Games for the Physically Disabled in Toronto, as a representative for British Columbia, she placed second in the women's Class 4 wheelchair event.

Rakiecki went on to partake in the 1982 Games for the Disabled in Langley, British Columbia held that July. She set three new Canadian records in claiming victory in each of the women's 100, 200 and 1500 metres events. During the 1983 Vancouver Marathon, Rakiecki became the first Canadian women wheelchair athlete to finish a marathon. She later competed at the 1984 World Wheelchair Games at Stoke Mandeville, England. Rakiecki won the gold medal in the women's 4 x 100 relay event and the silver medal in the 800 metres. In 1985, she won that year's Harry Jerome International Track Classic at Swangard Stadium with a new Canadian record and came third at the Honolulu Marathon Wheelchair event.

The following year, Rakiecki was chosen by the Canadian Wheelchair Sports Association as one of 23 athletes to partake in the 1986 Stoke Mandeville Games in Aylesbury, England. She won the Class 4 1500 metres wheelchair race, the Class 4 200 metres wheelchair event, and the women's Class 4 800 metres wheelchair competition. Rakiecki finished second in the women's race of the Richmond Flatland 10k held as part of the Canadian Wheelchair Championship. She later won a silver medal in the women's 1500 metres wheelchair open competition and a gold medal in the women's 400-metre open event at the 1987 International Games for the Disabled in Paris. At the 1987 World Championships in Athletics in Rome, Rakiecki won the women's exhibition 800 metres wheelchair competition with a new world record. In late 1987, she sought assistance from middle-distance coach Doug Clement to obtain a medal at the 1988 Summer Paralympics in Seoul, South Korea. Rakiecki placed fourth in her division at the 1988 Vancouver Sun Run.

She was due to compete at the Seoul Paralympics but was required to withdraw as a result of an inflamed bursa at the base of her spine needing draining and emergency surgery that forced her to retire from track and field on the advice of doctors due to the pressure of frequently remaining seated in one position for long periods of time. Rakiecki thus took up wheelchair basketball instead and became a player in the Wheelchair Basketball League. In 1990, she was chosen to play for the Canada women's national wheelchair basketball team at the Wheelchair Basketball World Championship in Saint-Étienne, France that July. Rakiecki helped Canada to claim the bronze medal at the tournament. She later participated for the Canada national squad in the Stoke Mandeville Wheelchair Games in Aylesbury, where Canada won the gold medal. In 1992, Rakiecki was part of the Canadian wheelchair basketball team that won the gold medal in the women's wheelchair basketball tournament at the 1992 Summer Paralympics in Barcelona, Spain.

After the Games, she switched from playing wheelchair basketball to wheelchair tennis. Rakiecki played with the Canadian national wheelchair tennis team and took the bronze medal at the 1995 World Team Cup in Roermond, the Netherlands to earn the first alternate spot for the 1996 Summer Paralympics. She later competed in the 1996 BC Open in Vancouver that July, reaching the singles final where she lost to fellow Canadian Yuka Chokyu. Rakiecki began competing in wheelchair marathons in 1996, competing at the 1999 New York City Marathon and finishing second for the silver medal in the women's wheelchair division of the main race. She finished second in the 2000 New York City Marathon in the event's first recognised women's handcycle race, and placed in the same position at the 2001 Okanagan International Marathon handcycle event.

== Awards ==
Rakiecki received the 1983 Terry Fox Scholarship, and was runner-up in the B.C. Amateur Sports Award for Disabled Athlete of the Year for 1983. She was appointed a recipient of the Vancouver Civic Merit Award "for outstanding achievement in a particular field of endeavour in sports, science, arts, or culture within the city and the province, or in recognition of a specific service" by Vancouver City Council in August 1984.
