= Petra Sax-Scharl =

German wheelchair tennis player

Sport
- Country: Germany
- Sport: Wheelchair tennis
Medal record
Paralympic Games
Bronze medal – third place	2000 Sydney	Women's doubles

Petra Sax-Scharl is a German wheelchair tennis player. She represented Germany at the 2000 Summer Paralympics and she won the bronze medal in the women's doubles event together with Christine Otterbach. She also competed in the women's singles event where she was eliminated in the first match.
