= Wheelchair basketball at the 1992 Summer Paralympics =

Wheelchair basketball at the IX Paralympic Games
- Paralympic Wheelchair Basketball
- Dates: 4 to 13 September
- Competitors: 136 from 11 nations

Medalists
1st place, gold medalist(s)		Netherlands (NED) (men); Canada (CAN) (women)
2nd place, silver medalist(s)		Germany (GER) (men); United States (USA) (women)
3rd place, bronze medalist(s)		France (FRA) (men); Netherlands (NED) (women)

Paralympic symbol (1988-1994)

Wheelchair basketball at the 1992 Summer Paralympics consisted of men's and women's team events.

== Medal summary ==
Event	Gold	Silver	Bronze
Men's team	Netherlands (NED) Frans van Breugel; Bob van den Broek; Wilhelmus Cappetijn; Mustafa Charif Jebari; Koen Jansens; Servaas Kamerling; Hubertus Klerks; Gert Jan van der Linden Sander Markus; Marinus Martens; Antonius de Rooy; Friedrich Wiegmann	Germany (GER) Tamer Artan; Georg Beschler; Wolfgang Hollhorst; Jurgen Julius; Abdulgazi Karaman; Armin Kinzelmann; Paul Kuhnreich; Frank Michael; Manfred Mikschy; Horst Rodig; Thomas Schafer; Hans Schumacher	France (FRA) Jean-Denis Aboukir; Philippe Baye; Eric Benault; Lionel Chavanne; Bruno Gaudefroy; Jean-Luc Genete; Michel Gradelle; Jean-Luc Granzotto; Jean-Marie Lubeth; Philippe Nuttin; Jean-Yves Regnault; Jean Reignier
Women's team	Canada (CAN) Marni Abbott; Chantal Benoit; Tracey Ferguson; Judy Goodrich; Patti Jones; Jennifer Krempien; Linda Kutrowski; Judie Millard; Kendra Ohama; Diane Rakiecki; Helene Simard; Irene Wownuk	United States (USA) Annette Espinoza; Susie Grimes; Sharon Hedrick; Ronda Jarvis; Kimberly Martin; Sharon McCarthy; Margaret Stran; Deborah Sunderman; Alma Torres; Tiana Tozer; Renee Tyree; Jamie Whitlow	Netherlands (NED) Jolanda Barbier-Kok; Theodora de Haan; Asjoesja Ibrahimi; Guda van der Laan Marja van Leeuwen-Lokker; Jozima Mosely; Elisabeth Pelzer; Yvonne Schafer; Maaike Smit; Ingeborg Tiggelman; Hatige Yavuz; Jaapje de Zeeuw

Source: Paralympic.org

== Medal table ==
Rank	Nation	Gold	Silver	Bronze	Total
1	Netherlands (NED)	1	0	1	2
2	Canada (CAN)	1	0	0	1
3	Germany (GER)	0	1	0	1
3	United States (USA)	0	1	0	1
5	France (FRA)	0	0	1	1
Totals (5 entries)		2	2	2	6

== See also ==
- Basketball at the 1992 Summer Olympics
