= Wheelchair tennis at the 2000 Summer Paralympics – Men's doubles =

Wheelchair tennis – Men's doubles at the XI Paralympic Games
- Paralympic wheelchair tennis
- Venue: Sydney Olympic Park Tennis Centre

Medalists
1st place, gold medalist(s)		Ricky Molier; Robin Ammerlaan	Netherlands
2nd place, silver medalist(s)		David Johnson; David Hall	Australia
3rd place, bronze medalist(s)		Stephen Welch; Scott Douglas	United States

Men's doubles
- Wheelchair tennis at the 2000 Summer Paralympics

Events
Singles	men	women
Doubles	men	women
- Summer Paralympics

The men's doubles wheelchair tennis competition at the 2000 Summer Paralympics in Sydney was held at the Sydney Olympic Park Tennis Centre.

== Draw ==
=== Key ===
- INV = Bipartite invitation
- IP = ITF place
- ALT = Alternate
- r = Retired
- w/o = Walkover

=== Finals ===
Semifinals
David Johnson (AUS); David Hall (AUS)	7	4	6
Stephen Welch (USA); Scott Douglas (USA)	6	6	4
Simon Hatt (GBR); Jayant Mistry (GBR)	3	7	1
Ricky Molier (NED); Robin Ammerlaan (NED)	6	5	6

Final (gold medal match)
David Johnson (AUS); David Hall (AUS)	5	6	3
Ricky Molier (NED); Robin Ammerlaan (NED)	7	1	6
Bronze medal match
Stephen Welch (USA); Scott Douglas (USA)	6	6	6
Simon Hatt (GBR); Jayant Mistry (GBR)	2	7	3

==== Top half ====
Round of 32
F Mazzei (ITA); C Rigolo (ITA)	7	4	6
R de Meersman (BEL); G Vos (BEL)	5	6	4
M Erni (SUI); C Tresch (SUI)	6	6	1
L Farkas (HUN); C Prohaszka (HUN)	4	7	6

Round of 16
D Johnson (AUS); D Hall (AUS)	6	6
F Mazzei (ITA); C Rigolo (ITA)	0	1
J Ramos (ESP); A Illobre (ESP)	1	0
A Yamakura (JPN); S Saida (JPN)	6	6
S Welch (USA); S Douglas (USA)	6	6
L Farkas (HUN); C Prohaszka (HUN)	1	0
P Britnell (NZL); W Fleming (NZL)	0	1
P Jaroszewski (POL); T Kruszelnicki (POL)	6	6

Quarterfinals
D Johnson (AUS); D Hall (AUS)	6	6
A Yamakura (JPN); S Saida (JPN)	0	3
S Welch (USA); S Douglas (USA)	6	6
P Jaroszewski (POL); T Kruszelnicki (POL)	2	3

Semifinals
D Johnson (AUS); D Hall (AUS)	7	4	6
S Welch (USA); S Douglas (USA)	6	6	4

==== Bottom half ====
Round of 32
S Muangprom (THA); J Yodyangdang (THA)	6	4	6
YL Chen (TPE); HT Cheng (TPE)	3	6	3
G Naor (ISR); E Sartov (ISR)	3	6	3
T Purschke (GER); R Weisang (GER)	6	1	6
C McKeage (CAN); P Johnson (CAN)	0	0
P Wikstrom (SWE); A Westman (SWE)	6	6

Round of 16
P Bonnet (FRA); L Giammartini (FRA)	6	6
R Corona (MEX); E Miramontes (MEX)	1	2
S Muangprom (THA); J Yodyangdang (THA)	1	2
S Hatt (GBR); J Mistry (GBR)	6	6
M Legner (AUT); S Krieghofer (AUT)	7	6
T Purschke (GER); R Weisang (GER)	5	2
P Wikstrom (SWE); A Westman (SWE)	2	0
R Molier (NED); R Ammerlaan (NED)	6	6

Quarterfinals
P Bonnet (FRA); L Giammartini (FRA)	3	5
S Hatt (GBR); J Mistry (GBR)	6	7
M Legner (AUT); S Krieghofer (AUT)	2	6	4
R Molier (NED); R Ammerlaan (NED)	6	4	6

Semifinals
S Hatt (GBR); J Mistry (GBR)	3	7	1
R Molier (NED); R Ammerlaan (NED)	6	5	6
