= David Johnson (tennis) =

Australian Paralympic tennis player

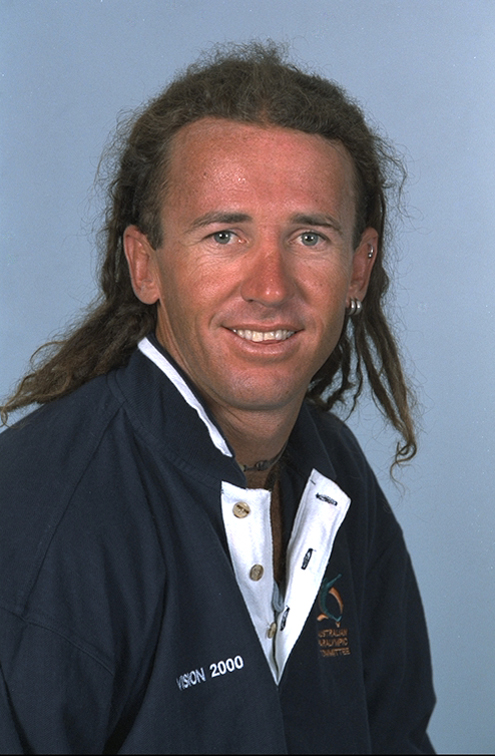
- 2000 Australian Paralympic team portrait of Johnson

Personal information
- Nationality: Australia
- Born: 16 September 1969 (age 56) Beaudesert, Queensland
Medal record
Wheelchair tennis
Representing Australia
Paralympic Games
Silver medal – second place	2000 Sydney	Men's Doubles

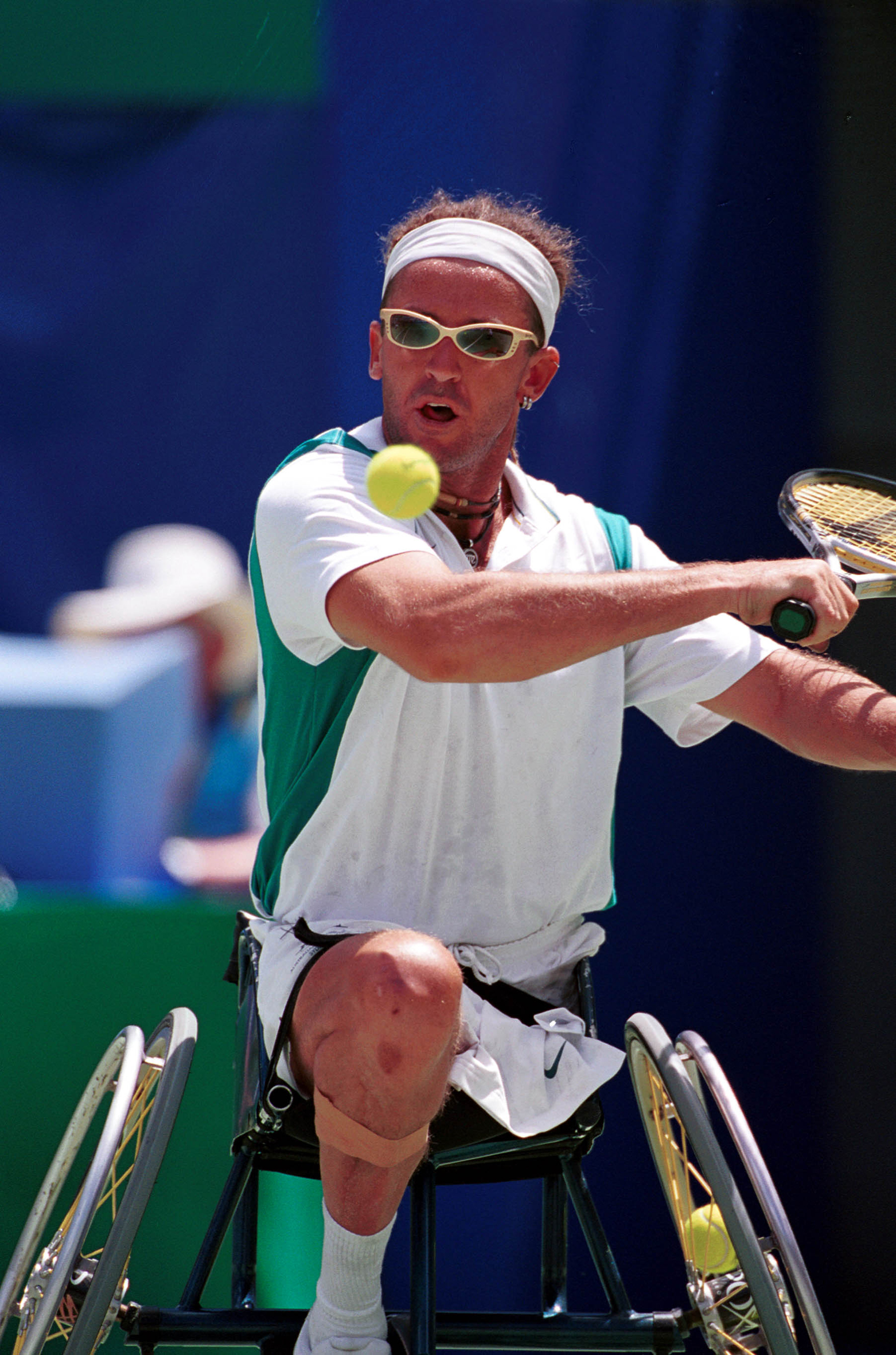
Johnson takes a backhand swing at the ball during 2000 Summer Paralympics match

David Johnson (born 16 September 1969) is an Australian Paralympic tennis player. He won a silver medal at the 2000 Sydney Games in the Men's Doubles event.
