= Alwin Houtsma =

Dutch Paralympic swimmer

Sport
- Country: Netherlands
- Sport: Paralympic swimming
Medal record
Paralympic Games
Gold medal – first place	1996 Atlanta	50 m freestyle MH
Gold medal – first place	1996 Atlanta	100 m freestyle MH
Gold medal – first place	2000 Sydney	50 m butterfly S14
Gold medal – first place	2000 Sydney	50 m freestyle S14
Gold medal – first place	2000 Sydney	100 m breaststroke SB14
Gold medal – first place	2000 Sydney	100 m freestyle S14
Gold medal – first place	2000 Sydney	200 m individual medley SM14
Silver medal – second place	2000 Sydney	200 m freestyle S14
Silver medal – second place	2000 Sydney	4×50 m medley relay S14
Bronze medal – third place	2000 Sydney	100 m backstroke S14

Alwin Houtsma is a Dutch Paralympic swimmer. He represented the Netherlands at the 1996 Summer Paralympics and at the 2000 Summer Paralympics. At the 1996 Summer Paralympics held in Atlanta, United States, he won two gold medals. At the 2000 Summer Paralympics in Sydney, Australia, he won five gold medals, two silver medals and one bronze medal.
