= Ricky Molier =

Dutch wheelchair tennis player

Personal information
- Born: 17 June 1976 (age 50)

Sport
- Country: Netherlands
- Sport: Wheelchair tennis
Medal record
Paralympic Games
Gold medal – first place	1996 Atlanta	Men's singles
Gold medal – first place	2000 Sydney	Men's doubles
Bronze medal – third place	1996 Atlanta	Men's doubles

Ricky Molier (born 17 June 1976) is a Dutch wheelchair tennis player. At the 1996 Summer Paralympics he won the gold medal in the men's singles event and together with Eric Stuurman the bronze medal in the men's doubles event. Together with Robin Ammerlaan he also won the gold medal in the men's doubles event at the 2000 Summer Paralympics.

He was the ITF World Champion in men's wheelchair tennis in 1996, 1997 and 2001.

He won the gold medal at the Wheelchair Tennis Masters in the men's singles event in 1998 and 2001. In 2000 he finished in second place in this event. In 2000 he also won the gold medal in the men's doubles event together with Stephen Welch of the United States.
