= Daniela Di Toro =

Australian wheelchair tennis player

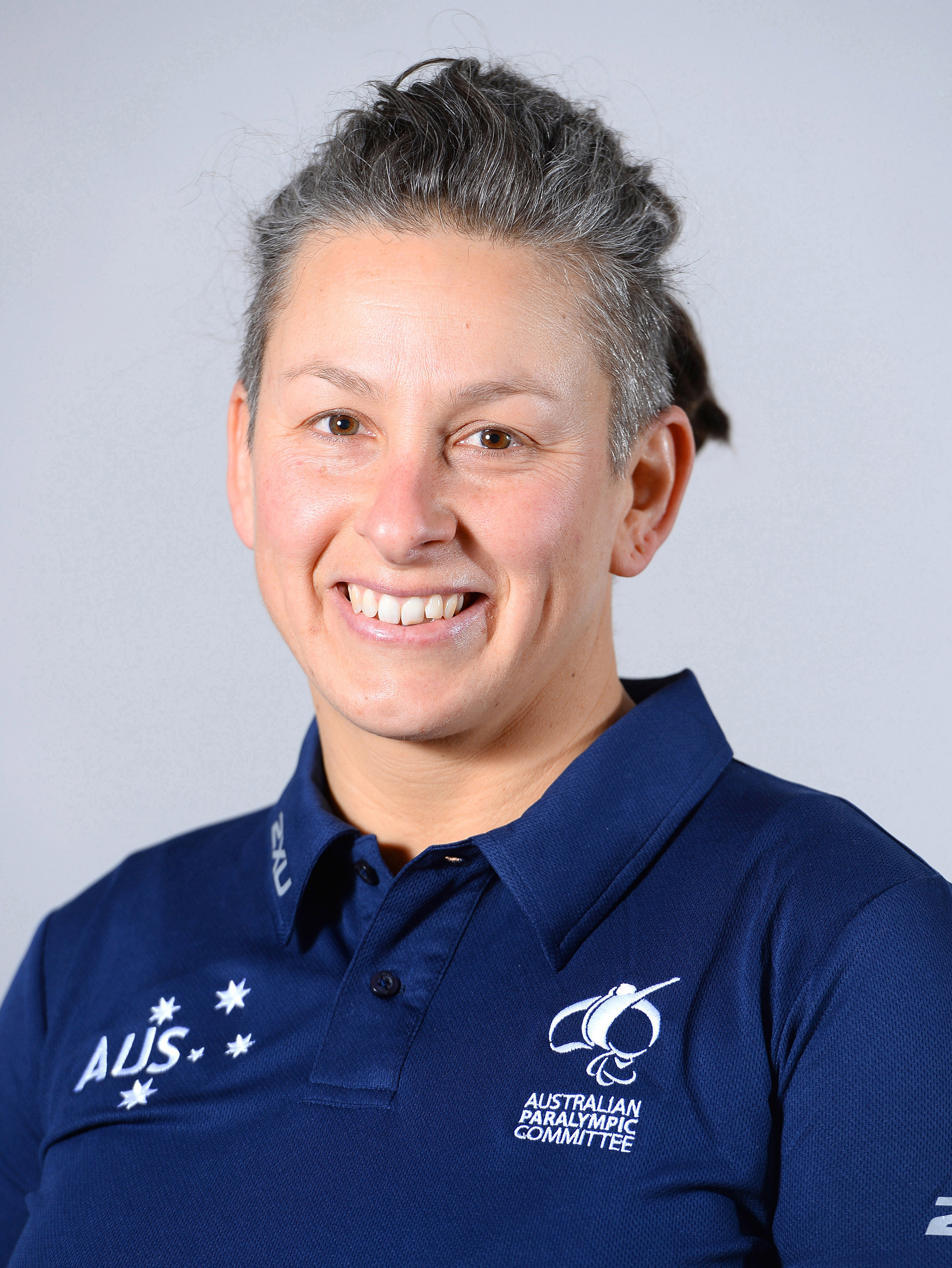
- 2016 Australian Paralympic team portrait of Di Toro
- Full name: Lisa Daniela Di Toro
- Country (sports): Australia
- Residence: Melbourne, Victoria
- Born: 16 October 1974 (age 51) Melbourne, Victoria
- Turned pro: 1988
- Plays: Right Handed

Singles
- Career record: 394–115
- Highest ranking: No. 1 (14 July 1998)

Grand Slam singles results
- Australian Open: F (2002, 2003, 2004, 2011)
- French Open: SF (2010)
- US Open: F (2010)

Other tournaments
- Masters: F (1995, 1996, 2010)
- Paralympic Games: Bronze Medal (2004)

Doubles
- Career record: 256–77
- Highest ranking: No. 1 (20 May 1997)

Grand Slam doubles results
- Australian Open: F (2010)
- French Open: W (2010)
- Wimbledon: F (2009, 2010)
- US Open: F (2009, 2010)

Other doubles tournaments
- Masters Doubles: W (2000)
- Paralympic Games: Silver Medal (2000)

Team competitions
- World Team Cup: Champion (1999)
Medal record
Representing Australia
Women's wheelchair tennis
Paralympic Games
Silver medal – second place	2000 Sydney	Women's Doubles
Bronze medal – third place	2004 Athens	Women's Singles
- Last updated on: 29 January 2012.

Lisa Daniela "Danni" Di Toro (born 16 October 1974) is an Australian wheelchair tennis and para table tennis player. Di Toro was the 2010 French Open doubles champion and has also been the Masters double champion. In singles, Di Toro is the former world number one and two-time masters finalist. In 2015, she moved to para-table tennis and represented Australia at the 2016 Rio Paralympics, where she was team captain with Kurt Fearnley. At the 2020 Tokyo Paralympics, her seventh Paralympics, she was the team captain and Opening Ceremony flag bearer with Ryley Batt. She competed at her eighth Paralympics in Paris.

== Personal life ==
Daniela Di Toro was born on 16 October 1974 in Melbourne, Victoria. She became a paraplegic in 1988 in an accident while competing at a school swimming carnival, when a wall fell on her. While in hospital, following her accident, Di Toro met Sandy Blythe, a member of the Australian Rollers. He inspired her to continue to pursue sports. She lives in the Melbourne suburb of Thornbury and she works as a youth worker in Melbourne. She graduated from Victoria University with a Bachelor of Chinese Medicine (Acupuncture and Herbs) in 2009.

In 2017, she was appointed Paralympics Australia's Athlete Engagement and Wellbeing Officer, and Vice Chairperson of the Athlete Commission.

== Wheelchair tennis ==
In the past I've always been so caught up in my own competition, I've missed out on seeing my friends compete and getting a sense of what people must feel when they're at a Paralympic Games. It's extraordinary.

— Daniela Di Toro

In wheelchair tennis, Di Toro is classified as Paraplegic T12/L1. She first started playing tennis when she was nine. She started playing wheelchair tennis in 1988, and started representing Australia in 1989, winning the Australian Open in 1991 – it would be her first of ten Australian Open titles. Internationally, she has been ranked as high as number one. She was once a scholarship holder at the Victorian Institute of Sport. As a professional tennis player, Di Toro has won more than three hundred matches. She is coached by Greg Crump. She trains at the Tennis Centre and Nunawading. Her club tennis is with Wheelchair Sport Victoria.

At the end of the 2010 season, Di Toro was ranked second in the world. During the 2010 season, she reached the quarterfinals of the Australian Open, semifinals of the French Open and finals of the US Open. In 2010, she won the Japan Open and the Korean Open. In 2010, Di Toro competed in the women's double tennis events at the four major tennis events. Her partners were Lucy Shuker of Great Britain and Aniek Van Koot of Holland. Di Toro was injured in 2011, and had to pull out of the French and Korean Opens because her neck was inflamed. The injury happened while she was competing at the Japanese Open and was a herniated disc.

=== Paralympics ===
Di Toro has competed as wheelchair tennis player in 4 consecutive Paralympic Games: Atlanta 1996, Sydney 2000, Athens 2004 and Beijing 2008. She won a silver medal at the 2000 Sydney Games in the Women's Doubles event, with Branka Pupovac as her partner. She won a bronze medal at the 2004 Games in the Women's singles event. She competed at the 2008 Paralympics, and was the only female wheelchair tennis player on the Australian team.

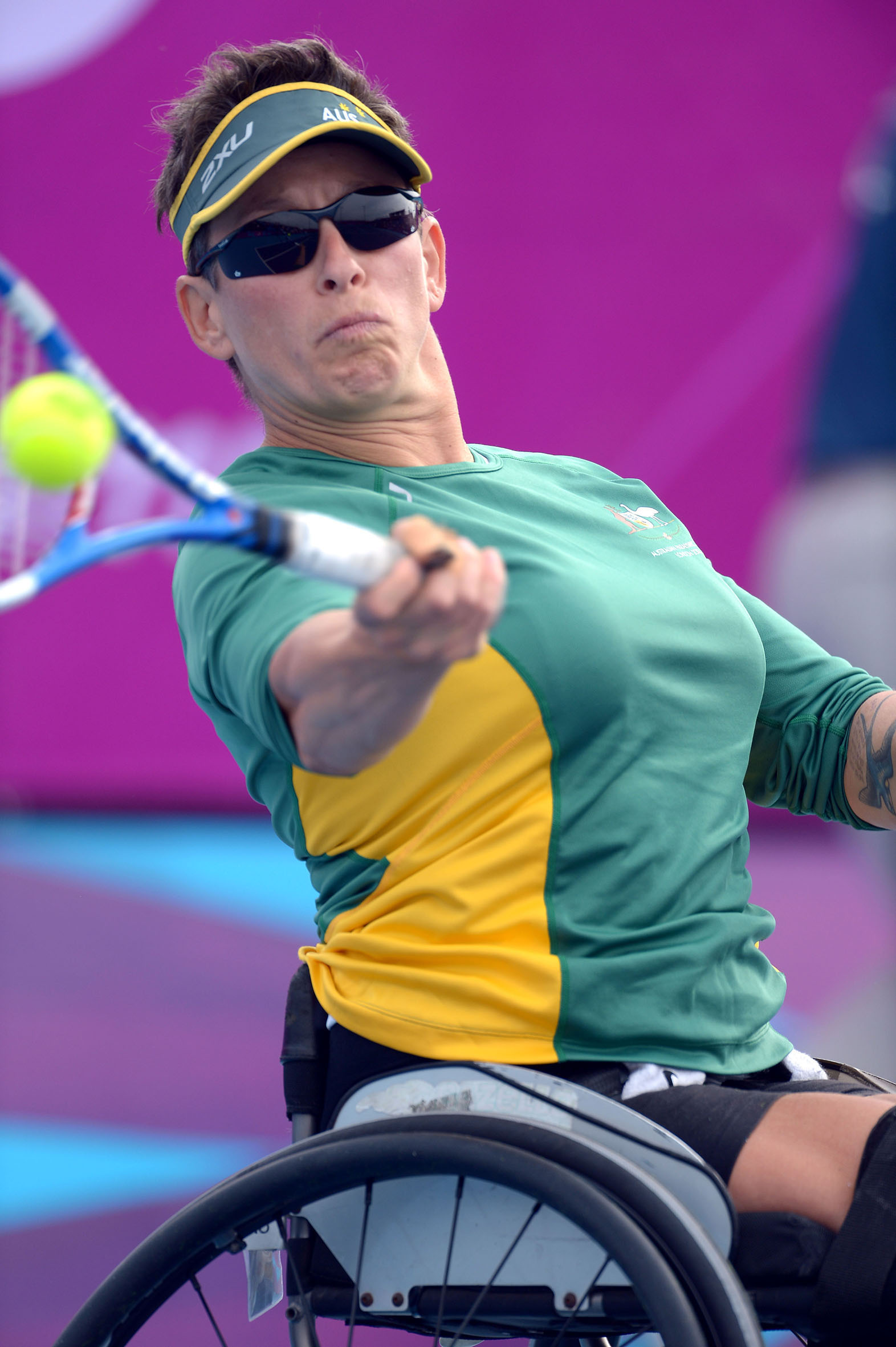
Di Toro playing at the 2012 London Paralympics

=== Kobe Open ===
Di Toro won the Kobe Open in 2003 in the women's singles event.

=== Retirement ===
In 2005, Di Toro retired from competitive tennis in order to spend more time studying Chinese medicine. She would end her career with 2 US Open titles, the 2000 Wheelchair Tennis Masters Doubles title, and a silver and bronze Paralympic medal. Following her 2005 retirement, she continued to be active in the wheelchair tennis community by coaching young tennis players.

=== Return from retirement ===
In January 2007, Di Toro came out of retirement to compete in the Australian Open's Wheelchair Tennis Super Series event where she lost in the first round. She would have more success in doubles, where she made the semi-finals with partner Lucy Shuker. She made her first finals appearance after retirement at Wimbledon in 2009. She would go on to make 6 straight finals including winning the 2010 French Open, beating Esther Vergeer and Sharon Walraven. She also made two finals appearances in singles, at the 2010 US Open and 2011 Australian Open. In 2010, she made the finals of the Wheelchair Tennis Masters in singles.

== Table Tennis ==
She is a Class 4 table tennis player. In April 2015, Toro dominated in the C3-5 competition at the International Table Tennis Federation (ITTF) Oceania Para-Table Tennis Championships. This was her first international para-table tennis competition after her move from wheelchair tennis.

At the 2016 Rio Paralympics, she lost both matches in the Women's Singles Class 4 and failed to advance. At the 2019 Oceania Para Table Tennis Championships, Darwin, she won the gold medal in the Women's Class 2–5.

At the 2020 Tokyo Paralympics, she lost both matches in the Women's Singles Class 4 and failed to advance.

Di Toro competed at the 2022 Commonwealth Games in the Women's singles C3-5 but did not progress past the group stage. She competed at the 2024 Paris Paralympics in the Women's Singles 4 and Women's Doubles 10 but did not progress after losing opening matches.

== Recognition ==
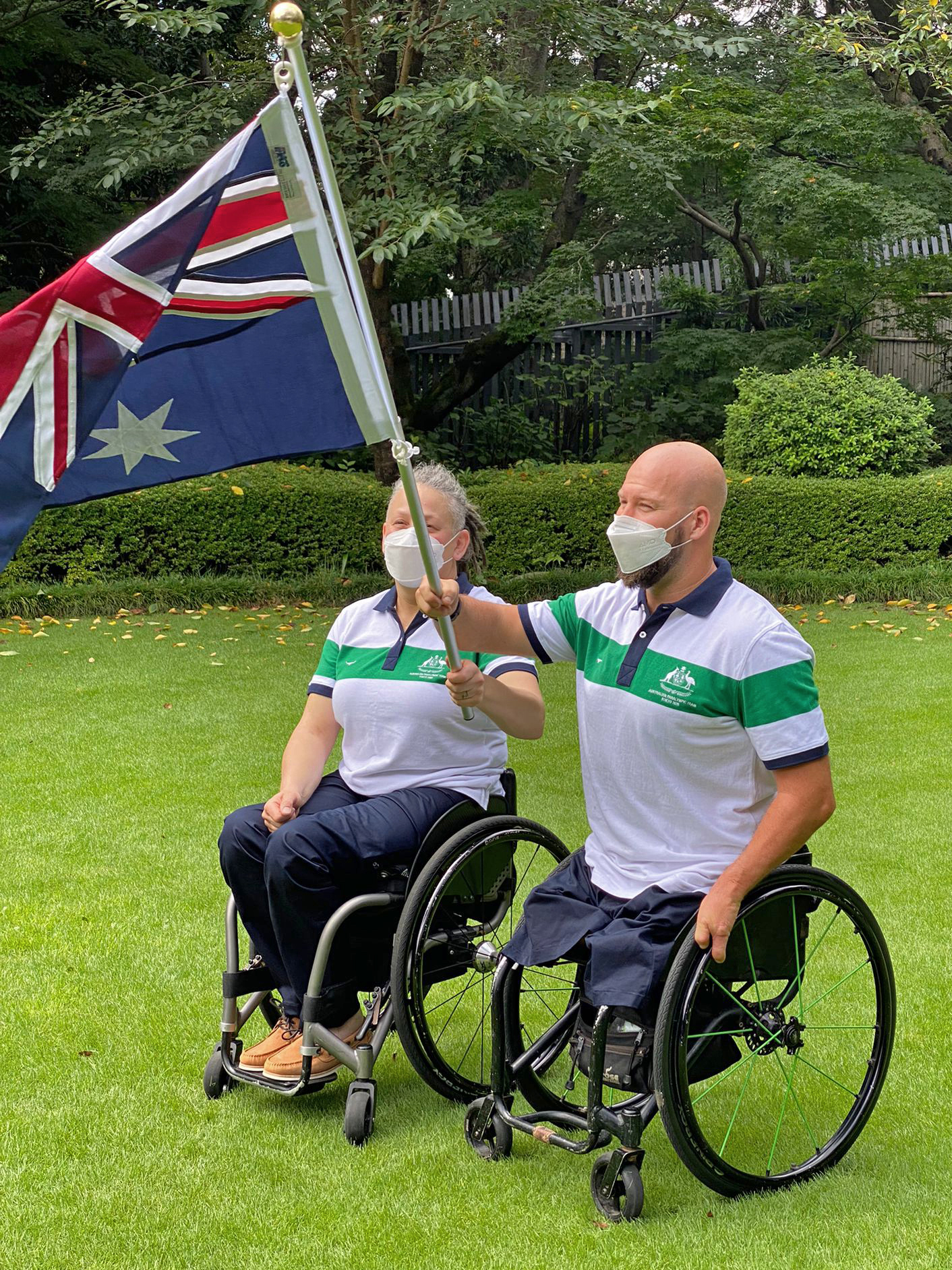
Team co-captains Daniela di Toro and Ryley Batt at the announcement that they would jointly carry the Australian flag in the opening ceremony at the Tokyo Paralympics

In 1999, Di Toro was named the Australian Paralympian of the Year. In 2000, she received an Australian Sports Medal, and in 2001, she was named the Young Victorian of the Year. In 2010, she was nominated as the Most Outstanding athlete with a disability by Tennis Australia. She was appointed team captain with Kurt Fearnley for the Australian Team at the 2016 Rio Paralympics. In November 2019, Batt with Daniela di Toro was named co-captain of the Australian Team at the 2020 Tokyo Paralympics. On 23 August 2021, di Toro and Batt were announced as the flagbearers for the Australian team for the Tokyo 2020 Paralympics opening ceremony. In 2022, she was awarded Paralympics Australia President’s Award.

== Performance timelines ==
Key
W	F	SF	QF	#R	RR	Q#	P#	DNQ	A	Z#	PO	G	S	B	NMS	NTI	P	NH

(W) winner; (F) finalist; (SF) semifinalist; (QF) quarterfinalist; (#R) rounds 4, 3, 2, 1; (RR) round-robin stage; (Q#) qualification round; (P#) preliminary round; (DNQ) did not qualify; (A) absent; (Z#) Davis/Fed Cup Zonal Group (with number indication) or (PO) play-off; (G) gold, (S) silver or (B) bronze Olympic/Paralympic medal; (NMS) not a Masters tournament; (NTI) not a Tier I tournament; (P) postponed; (NH) not held; (SR) strike rate (events won / competed); (W–L) win–loss record.

**To prevent confusion, this table only includes the events which took place from 2002 onwards at the Grand Slam venues.

=== Wheelchair singles ===
Tournament	1996	1997	1998	1999	2000	2001	2002	2003	2004	2005	2006	2007	2008	2009	2010	2011	2012
Grand Slam tournaments
Australian Open	Not held						F	F	F	Absent		1R	1R	SF	QF	F	QF
French Open	Not held											Absent			SF	A	A
US Open	Not held									Absent			NH	QF	F	QF	NH
Year-end championship
Wheelchair Tennis Masters	F	SF	A	SF	RR	Absent								SF	F	RR	
National representation
Paralympics	SF	Not held			QF	Not held			SF-B	Not held			1R	Not held			

=== Wheelchair doubles ===
Tournament	1996	1997	1998	1999	2000	2001	2002	2003	2004	2005	2006	2007	2008	2009	2010	2011	2012
Grand Slam tournaments
Australian Open	Not held								SF	Absent		QF	SF	SF	F	SF	SF
French Open	Not held											Absent			W	A	
Wimbledon	Not held													F	F	A	
US Open	Not held										Absent		NH	F	F	QF	
Year-end championship
Wheelchair Tennis Masters	Not held				W	Absent								RR	Absent		
National representation
Paralympics	SF	Not held			F-S	Not held			?	Not held			A	Not held			

Awards and achievements
Preceded by Jesse Martin	Young Victorian of the Year; 2001	Succeeded by Karen Chatto
