= Maaike Smit =

Dutch wheelchair tennis and basketball player

- Full name: Maaike Smit
- Country (sports): Netherlands
- Born: 7 August 1966 (age 60) Emmeloord, the Netherlands
- Turned pro: 1991
- Retired: 2012
- Plays: Right Handed
- Official website: www.maaikesmit.nl

Singles
- Highest ranking: 1 (08/04/1997)

Grand Slam singles results
- Australian Open: F (2005)
- US Open: SF (2006)

Other tournaments
- Masters: W (1997)
- Paralympic Games: Gold Medal (1996)

Doubles
- Highest ranking: 1 (02/10/2000)

Grand Slam doubles results
- Australian Open: W (2004, 2005)
- French Open: W (2007)
- US Open: F (2006)

Other doubles tournaments
- Masters Doubles: W (2000, 2001, 2002, 2003)
- Paralympic Games: Gold Medal (2000, 2004)
Medal record
Representing Netherlands
Paralympic Games
Women's wheelchair tennis
Gold medal – first place	1996 Atlanta	Women's singles
Bronze medal – third place	2000 Sydney	Women's singles
Gold medal – first place	2000 Sydney	Women's doubles
Gold medal – first place	2004 Athens	Women's doubles
Women's wheelchair Basketball
Bronze medal – third place	1988 Seoul	Women's team
Bronze medal – third place	1992 Barcelona	Women's team
- Last updated on: 27 June 2013.

Maaike Smit (7 August 1966, in Emmeloord) is a Dutch former professional wheelchair tennis and wheelchair basketball player.

Smit started wheelchair tennis at the age of 20. She played at the US Open and Australian Open, and won the Florida Open International Wheelchair Tennis Championship 4 times.

In 1996, Smit won a gold medal in the singles wheelchair event at the 1996 Atlanta Paralympics. She also won two gold medals in doubles at the 2000 Sydney and the 2004 Athens Paralympics.

She was sponsored by Invacare, a company that produces wheelchairs and other equipment for disabled people.
