= Hélène Simard =

Canadian wheelchair basketball player

- Full name: Hélène Simard
- Country (sports): Canada
- Residence: Charlesbourg, Quebec
- Born: 29 October 1965 (age 60) Baie-Comeau, Quebec, Canada
- Turned pro: 1995
- Retired: 2007
- Plays: Right-handed (one-handed backhand)

Singles
- Career titles: 5
- Highest ranking: No. 9 (31 July 1999)

Other tournaments
- Paralympic Games: 1R (2000, 2004)

Doubles
- Career titles: 4
- Highest ranking: No. 10 (17 June 1997)

Other doubles tournaments
- Paralympic Games: QF (2000)

Hélène Simard (born 29 October 1965) is a retired Canadian wheelchair basketball and wheelchair tennis player who competed in international level events. She has competed at the Paralympic Games three times. Simard won a gold medal in wheelchair basketball at the 1992 Summer Paralympics.
