= Branka Pupovac =

Australian wheelchair tennis player

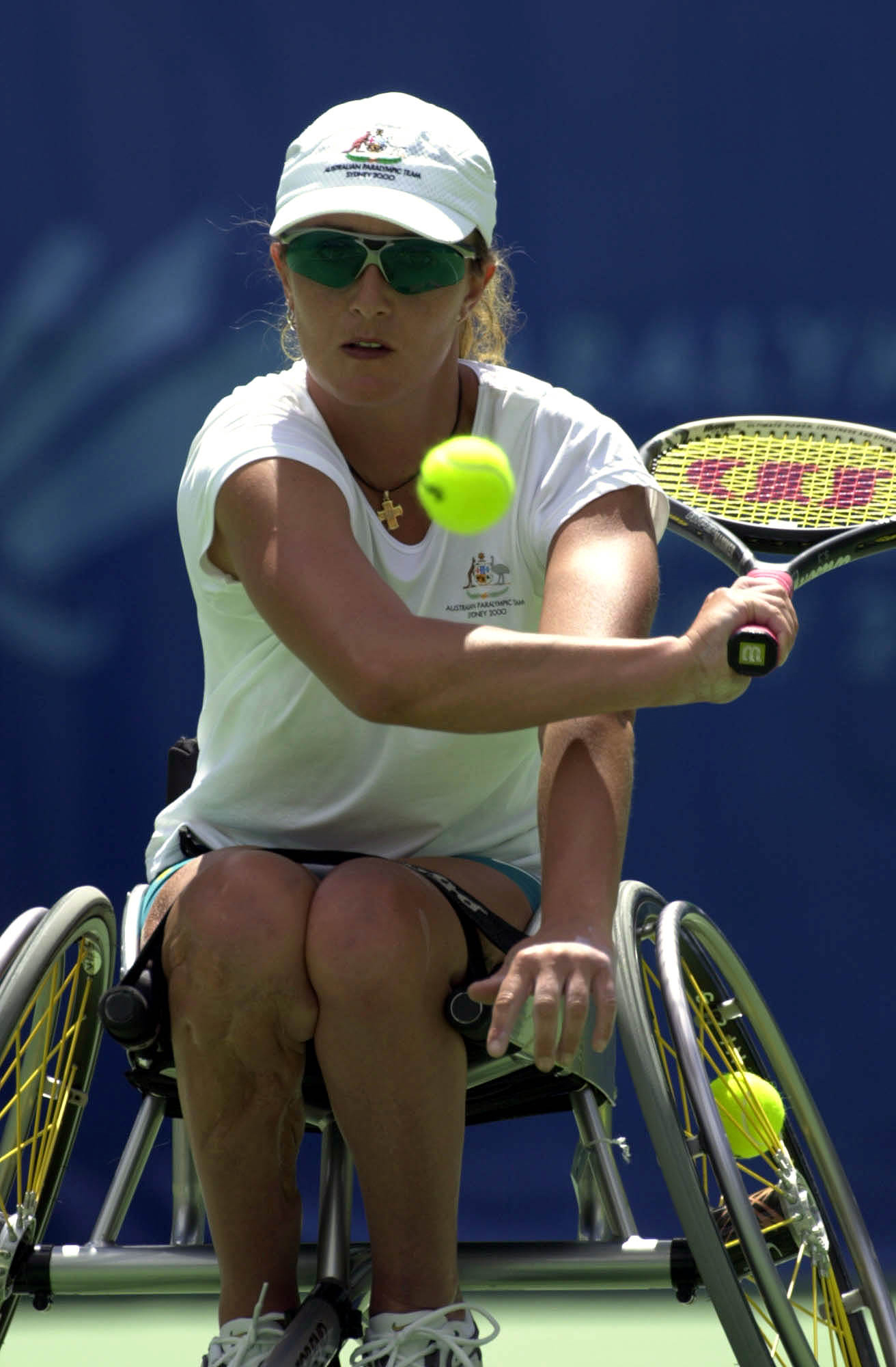
- Action shot of Pupovac during a match at the 2000 Summer Paralympics

Personal information
- Nationality: Australia
- Born: 3 March 1972 (age 54) Wollongong, New South Wales
Medal record
Women's wheelchair tennis
Representing Australia
Paralympic Games
Silver medal – second place	2000 Sydney	Women's Doubles

Branka Pupovac (born 3 March 1972) is a Paralympic wheelchair tennis competitor from Australia.

== Personal ==
Pupovac was born on 3 March 1972 in Wollongong, New South Wales. She is from Sydney, New South Wales and attended the University of Wollongong where she earned a Bachelor of Commerce. In 2000, she was studying to become a counsellor. Pupovac is an incomplete paraplegic, as a result of an accident while riding on the back of a friend's motorcycle when she was twenty. Her friend crossed a set of double lines in an effort to overtake a car. She was wearing a helmet at the time, but still had significant damage done to her neck and spinal cord.

Pupovac, alongside Karni Liddell, Hamish MacDonald and Charmaine Dalli, was one of eighteen Australian Paralympians photographed by Emma Hack for a nude calendar. The photograph of her in the calendar features her topless and covered in brown and gold body paint.

== Tennis ==
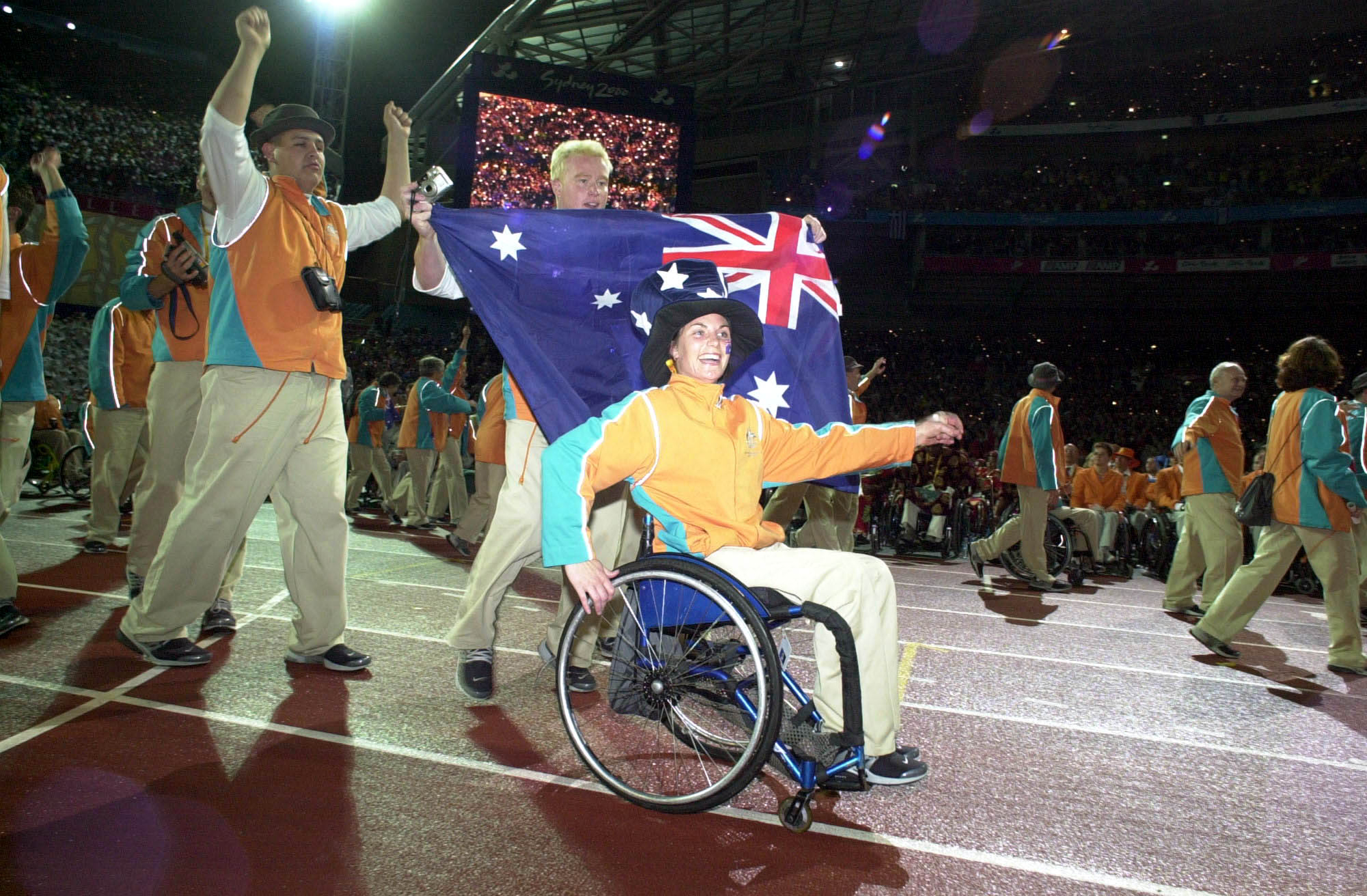
Pupovac (shown front) in the Athletes Parade at the 2000 Summer Paralympics Opening Ceremony

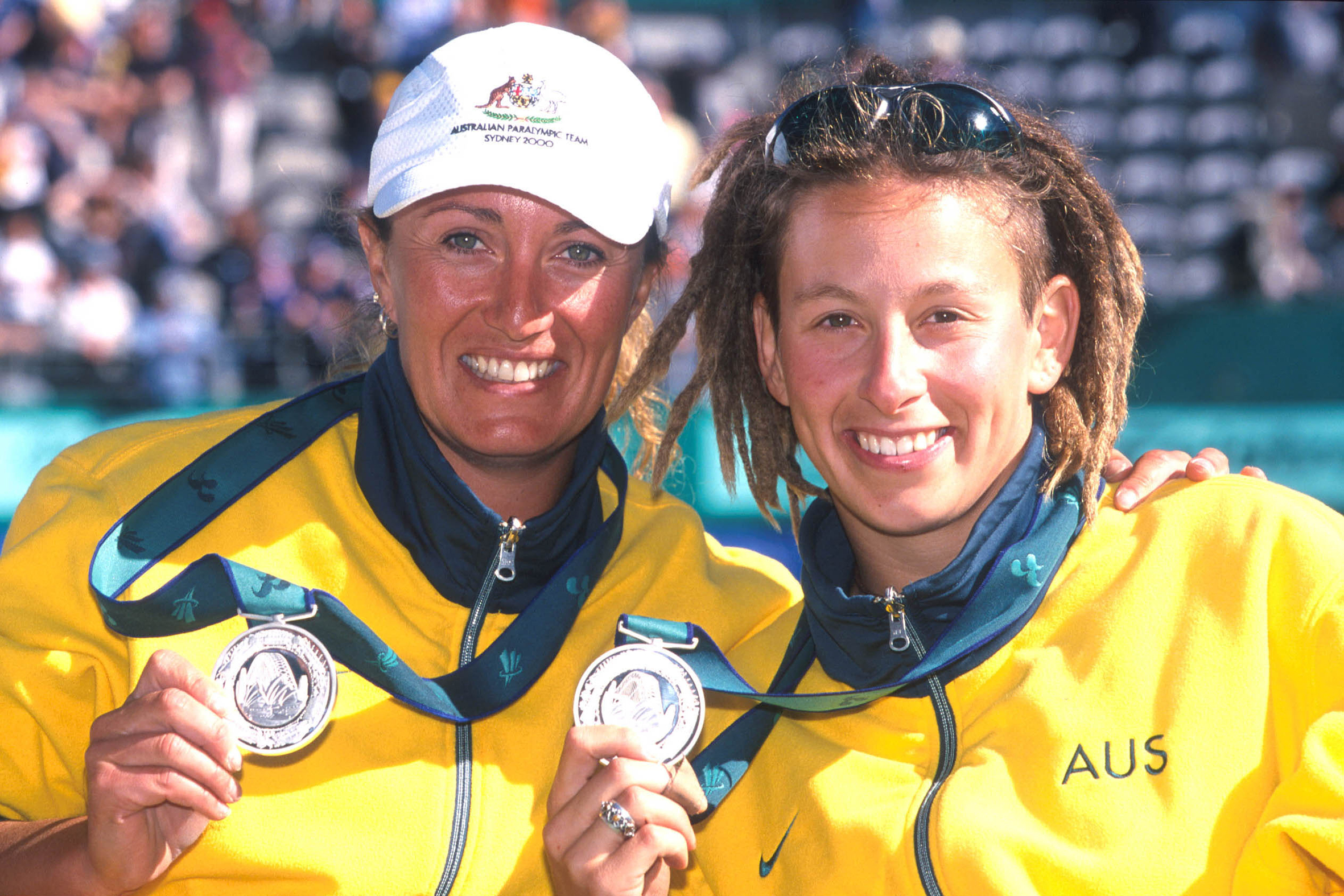
Pupovac (shown left) and Daniela Di Toro smiling as they show their gold medals won at the Women's Doubles 2000 Summer Paralympics

Pupovac first competed internationally in wheelchair tennis in 1996. In 1996, she was chosen as a member of the Australian Paralympic's Wheelchair tennis Development Squad. She was later chosen to be a member of Australia's World Team Cup. At the 1997 U.S. Open of Wheelchair Tennis, Branka was swept in straight sets by Chantal Vandierendonck during the first round. Vandierendonck beat her 6–2, and 6–1. In 1998, she was ranked 14th in the world for women's singles and doubles tennis. While preparing for the 2000 Summer Paralympics, she would train up to six days a week. In 1998, she made the quarterfinals of the Australian Open. The same year, at the US Open, she won the consolation draw. In 1998, she also made the finals of the British Open consolation draw. In August 1999, she had her highest single's international ranking when she was ranked ninth in the world. In 2000, her competitive sport participation was sponsored by the Motor Accidents Authority in New South Wales. In 2000, she finished second at the Australian Open and French Open in the consolidation draw. She was a 1998 and 2000 Motor Accidents Authority Paralympian. She won a silver medal at the 2000 Sydney Games in the Women's Doubles event, with Daniela Di Toro as her partner. In October 2000, she had her highest doubles international ranking when she was ranked 12th. She competed in her final international competition in 2004, at the World Team Cup in New Zealand.
