= Athletics at the 2008 Summer Paralympics =

Athletics at the XIII Paralympic Games
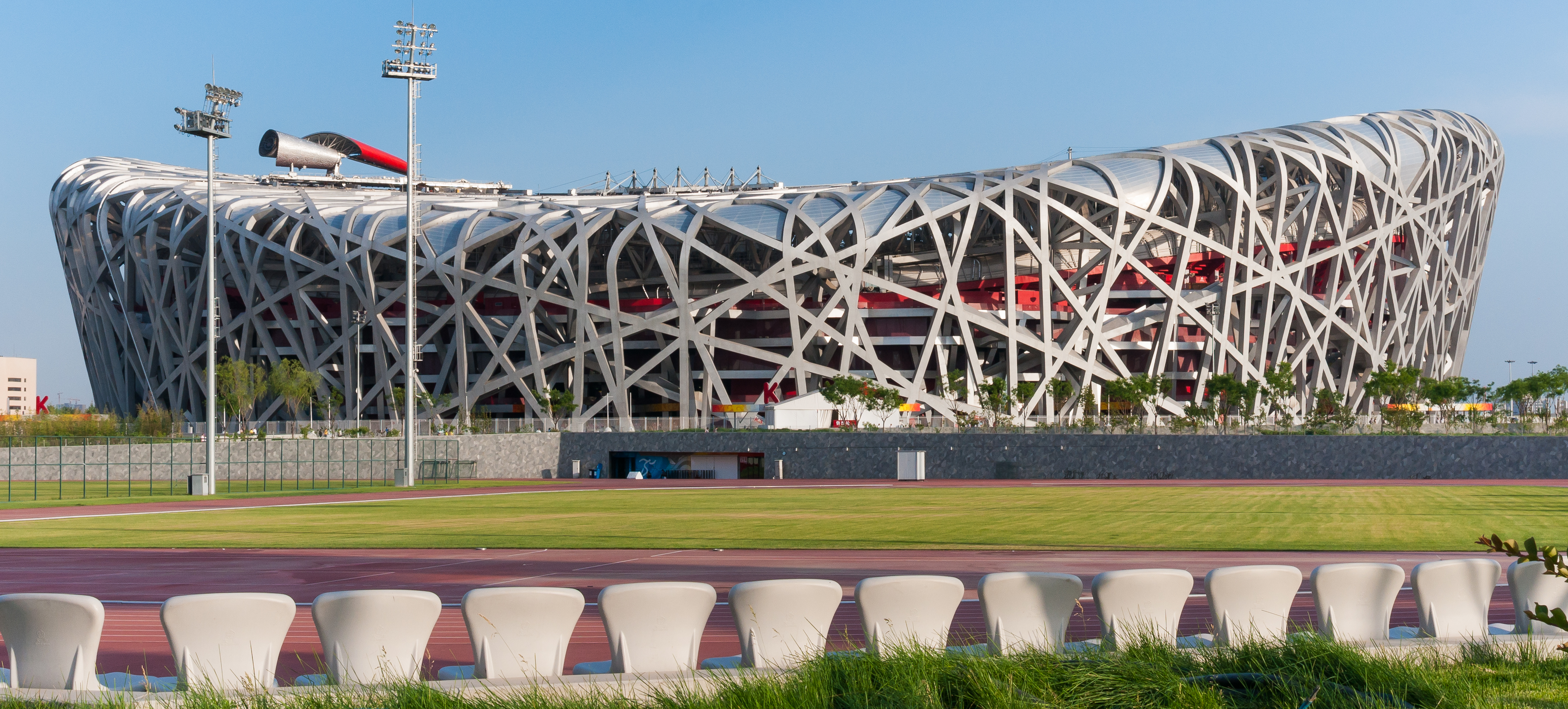
- Host stadium (shown in 2009)
- Venue: Beijing National Stadium
- Dates: 8–17 September 2008
- Competitors: 1028 from 111 nations

Athletics at the 2008 Summer Paralympics were held in Beijing National Stadium from September 8 to September 17. There were 160 gold medals in this sport.

== Classification ==
Athletes are given a classification depending on the type and extent of their disability. The classification system allows athletes to compete against others with a similar level of function.

The athletics classifications are:

- 11–13: Blind athletes
- 20: Athletes with an intellectual disability
- 32–38: Athletes with cerebral palsy
- 40: Les Autres (others) (including people with dwarfism)
- 42–46: Amputees
- 51–58: Athletes with a spinal cord disability

The class numbers are given prefixes of "T", "F" and "P" for track, field and pentathlon events, respectively.

== Events ==
For each of the events below, medals are contested for one or more of the above classifications.

=== Track events - Men ===
- Men's 100 m
  - T11
  - T12
  - T13
  - T35
  - T36
  - T37
  - T38
  - T42
  - T44
  - T46
  - T52
  - T53
  - T54
- Men's 200 m
  - T11
  - T12
  - T13
  - T36
  - T37
  - T38
  - T44
  - T46
  - T52
  - T53
  - T54
- Men's 400 m
  - T11
  - T12
  - T13
  - T36
  - T38
  - T44
  - T46
  - T52
  - T53
  - T54
- Men's 800 m
  - T12
  - T13
  - T36
  - T37
  - T46
  - T52
  - T53
  - T54
- Men's 1500 m
  - T11
  - T13
  - T46
  - T54
- Men's 5000 m
  - T11
  - T13
  - T46
  - T54
- Men's 10000 m
  - T12
- Men's 4 × 100 m relay
  - T11–T13
  - T35–T38
  - T42–T46
  - T53–T54
- Men's 4 × 400 m relay
  - T53–T54
- Men's Marathon
  - T12
  - T46
  - T52
  - T54

=== Track events - Women ===
- Women's 100 m
  - T11
  - T12
  - T13
  - T36
  - T37
  - T38
  - T42
  - T44
  - T46
  - T52
  - T53
  - T54
- Women's 200 m
  - T11
  - T12
  - T13
  - T36
  - T37
  - T38
  - T44
  - T46
  - T52
  - T53
  - T54
- Women's 400 m
  - T12
  - T13
  - T53
  - T54
- Women's 800 m
  - T12–13
  - T53
  - T54
- Women's 1500 m
  - T13
  - T54
- Women's 5000 m
  - T54
- Women's 4 × 100 m relay
  - T53–T54
- Women's Marathon
  - T54

=== Field events - Men ===
- Men's Club throw
  - F32/51
- Men's Discus throw
  - F11–12
  - F32/51
  - F33–34/52
  - F35–36
  - F37–38
  - F42
  - F44
  - F53–54
  - F55–56
  - F57–58
- Men's High jump
  - F44/46
- Men's Javelin throw
  - F11–12
  - F33–34/52
  - F35–36
  - F37–38
  - F42/44
  - F53–54
  - F55–56
  - F57–58
- Men's Long jump
  - F11
  - F12
  - F37–38
  - F42/44
  - F46
- Men's Pentathlon
  - P12
  - P44
- Men's Shot put
  - F11–12
  - F32
  - F33–34/52
  - F35–36
  - F37–38
  - F40
  - F42
  - F44
  - F53–54
  - F55–56
  - F57–58
- Men's Triple jump
  - F11
  - F12

=== Field events - Women ===
- Women's Discus throw
  - F12–13
  - F32–34/51–53
  - F35–36
  - F37–38
  - F40
  - F42–46
  - F54–56
  - F57–58
- Women's Javelin throw
  - F33–34/52–53
  - F35–38
  - F42–46
  - F54–56
  - F57–58
- Women's Long jump
  - F12
  - F13
  - F42
  - F44
- Women's Shot put
  - F12–13
  - F32–34/52–53
  - F35–36
  - F37–38
  - F40
  - F42–46
  - F54–56
  - F57–58

== Participating countries ==
There were 1028 athletes (696 male, 332 female) from 111 countries taking part in the athletics competitions.

- Algeria (23)
- Angola (6)
- Argentina (8)
- Australia (47)
- Austria (7)
- Azerbaijan (7)
- Bahrain (2)
- Bangladesh (1)
- Belarus (18)
- Belgium (3)
- Bosnia and Herzegovina (2)
- Brazil (47)
- Bulgaria (7)
- Burundi (3)
- Cambodia (1)
- Canada (26)
- Chile (1)
- China (80)
- Chinese Taipei (1)
- Colombia (1)
- Croatia (13)
- Cuba (17)
- Cyprus (1)
- Czech Republic (25)
- Denmark (3)
- Dominican Republic (1)
- Egypt (6)
- El Salvador (1)
- Ethiopia (2)
- Fiji (1)
- Finland (4)
- France (25)
- Gabon (1)
- Germany (42)
- Great Britain (35)
- Greece (29)
- Guatemala (1)
- Guinea (1)
- Honduras (1)
- Hong Kong (2)
- Iceland (2)
- India (2)
- Iran (14)
- Iraq (1)
- Ireland (10)
- Israel (1)
- Italy (10)
- Ivory Coast (2)
- Jamaica (4)
- Japan (31)
- Jordan (5)
- Kazakhstan (1)
- Kenya (12)
- Kuwait (3)
- Latvia (4)
- Lesotho (1)
- Lithuania (8)
- Macau (1)
- Malaysia (1)
- Malta (1)
- Mauritius (1)
- Mexico (34)
- Morocco (14)
- Myanmar (1)
- Namibia (1)
- Nepal (1)
- Netherlands (8)
- New Zealand (5)
- Nigeria (9)
- Norway (2)
- Pakistan (2)
- Palestine (2)
- Panama (1)
- Papua New Guinea (2)
- Poland (29)
- Portugal (13)
- Puerto Rico (1)
- Qatar (1)
- Russia (39)
- Rwanda (1)
- Samoa (1)
- Saudi Arabia (2)
- Senegal (2)
- Serbia (6)
- Singapore (1)
- Slovakia (5)
- Slovenia (4)
- South Africa (17)
- South Korea (8)
- Spain (24)
- Sri Lanka (3)
- Suriname (1)
- Sweden (6)
- Switzerland (14)
- Syria (1)
- Tanzania (1)
- Thailand (11)
- Tonga (1)
- Tunisia (33)
- Turkey (1)
- Ukraine (28)
- United Arab Emirates (5)
- United States (43)
- Uruguay (1)
- Venezuela (16)
- Vietnam (3)
- Zambia (1)
- Zimbabwe (2)

== Medal summary ==
=== Medal table ===
This ranking sorts countries by the number of gold medals earned by their athletes (in this context a nation is an entity represented by a National Paralympic Committee). The number of silver medals is taken into consideration next and then the number of bronze medals. If, after the above, countries are still tied, equal ranking is given and they are listed alphabetically.

Rank	Nation	Gold	Silver	Bronze	Total
1	China (CHN)	38	28	18	84
2	Australia (AUS)	10	9	7	26
3	South Africa (RSA)	10	2	4	16
4	Canada (CAN)	10	1	8	19
5	United States (USA)	9	14	5	28
6	Tunisia (TUN)	9	9	3	21
7	Ukraine (UKR)	9	7	8	24
8	Germany (GER)	5	9	7	21
9	Kenya (KEN)	5	3	1	9
10	Brazil (BRA)	4	4	7	15
11	Cuba (CUB)	4	3	4	11
12	Morocco (MAR)	4	1	3	8
13	Russia (RUS)	3	7	6	16
14	France (FRA)	3	5	6	14
15	Mexico (MEX)	3	1	3	7
16	Croatia (CRO)	3	1	0	4
17	Ireland (IRL)	3	0	0	3
18	Great Britain (GBR)	2	7	8	17
19	Japan (JPN)	2	7	3	12
20	Thailand (THA)	2	5	4	11
21	Poland (POL)	2	4	6	12
22	Algeria (ALG)	2	3	7	12
23	Iran (IRI)	2	3	1	6
24	Finland (FIN)	2	1	1	4
25	Austria (AUT)	2	1	0	3
25	Nigeria (NGR)	2	1	0	3
27	Greece (GRE)	1	2	7	10
28	Switzerland (SUI)	1	2	5	8
29	Belarus (BLR)	1	2	0	3
29	Latvia (LAT)	1	2	0	3
29	Netherlands (NED)	1	2	0	3
32	Spain (ESP)	1	1	5	7
33	Azerbaijan (AZE)	1	1	4	6
34	Denmark (DEN)	1	1	0	2
34	Saudi Arabia (KSA)	1	1	0	2
36	Czech Republic (CZE)	1	0	8	9
37	South Korea (KOR)	1	0	3	4
38	Hong Kong (HKG)	1	0	1	2
39	Angola (ANG)	0	3	0	3
40	Cyprus (CYP)	0	2	0	2
41	Argentina (ARG)	0	1	1	2
41	Bulgaria (BUL)	0	1	1	2
41	Egypt (EGY)	0	1	1	2
41	Venezuela (VEN)	0	1	1	2
45	Colombia (COL)	0	1	0	1
45	Jordan (JOR)	0	1	0	1
45	Lithuania (LTU)	0	1	0	1
45	New Zealand (NZL)	0	1	0	1
45	Pakistan (PAK)	0	1	0	1
45	Papua New Guinea (PNG)	0	1	0	1
45	Portugal (POR)	0	1	0	1
45	Serbia (SRB)	0	1	0	1
45	Slovenia (SLO)	0	1	0	1
54	Italy (ITA)	0	0	1	1
54	Jamaica (JAM)	0	0	1	1
54	Namibia (NAM)	0	0	1	1
Totals (56 entries)		162	168	160	490

=== Men's events ===
Event	Class	Gold	Silver	Bronze
100 m	100 m T11	Lucas Prado; Brazil	José Sayovo; Angola	Tresor Makunda; France
100 m	100 m T12	Josiah Jamison; United States	Adekunle Adesoji; Nigeria	Yang Yuqing; China
100 m	100 m T13	Jason Smyth; Ireland	Alexy Labzin; Russia	Luis Felipe Gutiérrez; Cuba
100 m	100 m T35	Yang Sen; China	Fu Xinhan; China	Teboho Mokgalagadi; South Africa
100 m	100 m T36	Roman Pavlyk; Ukraine	Ben Rushgrove; Great Britain	So Wa Wai; Hong Kong
100 m	100 m T37	Fanie van der Merwe; South Africa	Ma Yuxi; China	Sofiane Hamdi; Algeria
100 m	100 m T38	Evan O'Hanlon; Australia	Zhou Wenjun; China	Mykyta Senyk; Ukraine
100 m	100 m T42	Earle Connor; Canada	Heinrich Popow; Germany	John McFall; Great Britain
100 m	100 m T44	Oscar Pistorius; South Africa	Jerome Singleton; United States	Brian Frasure; United States
100 m	100 m T46	Heath Francis; Australia	Francis Kompaon; Papua New Guinea	Yohansson Nascimento; Brazil
100 m	100 m T52	Dean Bergeron; Canada	Beat Bosch; Switzerland	Andre Beaudoin; Canada
100 m	100 m T53	Josh George; United States	Mickey Bushell; Great Britain	Yu Shiran; China
100 m	100 m T54	Leo-Pekka Tähti; Finland	Saichon Konjen; Thailand	Supachai Koysub; Thailand
200 m	200 m T11	Lucas Prado; Brazil	José Sayovo; Angola	Arian Iznaga; Cuba
200 m	200 m T12	Hilton Langenhoven; South Africa	Li Yansong; China	Yang Yuqing; China
200 m	200 m T13	Jason Smyth; Ireland	Alexy Labzin; Russia	Vugar Mehdiyev; Azerbaijan
200 m	200 m T36	So Wa Wai; Hong Kong	Roman Pavlyk; Ukraine	Che Mian; China
200 m	200 m T37	Fanie van der Merwe; South Africa	Sofiane Hamdi; Algeria	Ma Yuxi; China
200 m	200 m T38	Evan O'Hanlon; Australia	Zhou Wenjun; China	Mykyta Senyk; Ukraine
200 m	200 m T44	Oscar Pistorius; South Africa	Jim Bob Bizzell; United States	Ian Jones; Great Britain
200 m	200 m T46	Heath Francis; Australia	Antonis Aresti; Cyprus	Ettiam Calderon; Cuba
200 m	200 m T52	Dean Bergeron; Canada	Beat Bosch; Switzerland	Peth Rungsri; Thailand
200 m	200 m T53	Yu Shiran; China	Richard Colman; Australia	Hong Suk-Man; South Korea
200 m	200 m T54	Zhang Lixin; China	Saichon Konjen; Thailand	Leo-Pekka Tähti; Finland
400 m	400 m T11	Lucas Prado; Brazil	José Sayovo; Angola	Oleksandr Ivaniukhin; Ukraine
400 m	400 m T12	Li Yansong; China	Matthias Schroder; Germany	Luís Gonçalves; Portugal
400 m	400 m T13	Luis Manuel Galano; Cuba	Freddy Durruthy; Cuba	Ioannis Protos; Greece
400 m	400 m T36	Roman Pavlyk; Ukraine	Artem Arefyev; Russia	Che Mian; China
400 m	400 m T38	Farhat Chida; Tunisia	Abbes Saidi; Tunisia	Andriy Onufriyenko; Ukraine
400 m	400 m T44	Oscar Pistorius; South Africa	Jim Bob Bizzell; United States	Ian Jones; Great Britain
400 m	400 m T46	Heath Francis; Australia	Antonis Aresti; Cyprus	Samuel Colmenares; Venezuela
400 m	400 m T52	Tomoya Ito; Japan	Toshihiro Takada; Japan	Dean Bergeron; Canada
400 m	400 m T53	Hong Suk-Man; South Korea	Li Huzhao; China	Richard Colman; Australia
400 m	400 m T54	Zhang Lixin; China	David Weir; Great Britain	Saichon Konjen; Thailand
800 m	800 m T12	Abderrahim Zhiou; Tunisia	Lazaro Raschid Aguilar; Cuba	Odair Santos; Brazil
800 m	800 m T13	Abdelillah Mame; Morocco	Peter Gottwald Jr. United States	Zine Eddine Sekhri; Algeria
800 m	800 m T36	Artem Arefyev; Russia	He Chengen; China	Pavel Kharagezov; Russia
800 m	800 m T37	Michael McKillop; Ireland	Brad Scott; Australia	Djamel Mastouri; France
800 m	800 m T46	Marcin Awizen; Poland	Samir Nouioua; Algeria	Abderrahman Ait Khamouch; Spain
800 m	800 m T52	Tomoya Ito; Japan	Toshihiro Takada; Japan	Thomas Geierspichler; Austria
800 m	800 m T53	Li Huzhao; China	Josh George; United States	Hong Suk-Man; South Korea
800 m	800 m T54*	David Weir; Great Britain	Kurt Fearnley; Australia	Prawat Wahoram; Thailand
1500 m	1500 m T11	Zhang Zhen; China	Samwel Mushai Kimani; Kenya	Jason Dunkerley; Canada
1500 m	1500 m T13	Henry Kiprono Kirwa; Kenya	Lazaro Raschid Aguilar; Cuba	Ignacio Avila; Spain
1500 m	1500 m T46	Abraham Cheruiyot Tarbei; Kenya	Abderrahman Ait Khamouch; Spain	Samir Nouioua; Algeria
1500 m	1500 m T54	David Weir; Great Britain	Prawat Wahoram; Thailand	Kurt Fearnley; Australia
5000 m	5000 m T11	Zhang Zhen; China	Francis Thuo Karanja; Kenya	Henry Wanyoike; Kenya
5000 m	5000 m T13	Henry Kiprono Kirwa; Kenya	Youssef Benibrahim; Morocco	Odair Santos; Brazil
5000 m	5000 m T46	Abraham Cheruiyot Tarbei; Kenya	Mohamed Fouzai; Tunisia	Mario Santillan; Mexico
5000 m	5000 m T54	Prawat Wahoram; Thailand	Kurt Fearnley; Australia	David Weir; Great Britain
10000 m	10000 m T12	Henry Kiprono Kirwa; Kenya	Abderrahim Zhiou; Tunisia	Odair Santos; Brazil
Marathon	Marathon T12	Qi Shun; China	Elkin Serna; Colombia	Ildar Pomykalov; Russia
Marathon	Marathon T46	Mario Santillan; Mexico	Tito Sena; Brazil	Walter Endrizzi; Italy
Marathon	Marathon T52	Thomas Geierspichler; Austria	Hirokazu Ueyonabaru; Japan	Toshihiro Takada; Japan
Marathon	Marathon T54	Kurt Fearnley; Australia	Hiroki Sasahara; Japan	Ernst van Dyk; South Africa
4 × 100 m relay	4 × 100 m T11–T13	China (CHN); Liu Xiangkun; Li Qiang; Yang Yuqing; Li Yansong	Venezuela (VEN); Yoldani Silva; Ricardo Santana; Oduver Daza; Fernando Ferrer	France (FRA); Tresor Makunda; Pasquale Gallo; Stéphane Bozzolo; Ronan Pallier
4 × 100 m relay	4 × 100 m T35–T38	Australia (AUS); Evan O'Hanlon; Darren Thrupp; Christopher Mullins; Timothy Sullivan	China (CHN); Che Mian; Zhou Wenjun; Yang Chen; Ma Yuxi	Tunisia (TUN); Fares Hamdi; Abbes Saidi; Mohamed Charmi; Farhat Chida
4 × 100 m relay	4 × 100 m T42–T46	United States (USA); Jim Bob Bizzell; Brian Frasure; Casey Tibbs; Jerome Singleton	Brazil (BRA); André Luiz Oliveira; Yohansson Nascimento; Claudemir Santos; Alan Oliveira	Australia (AUS); Heath Francis; Stephen Wilson; Aaron Chatman; Paul Raison
4 × 100 m relay	4 × 100 m T53–T54	China (CHN); Zong Kai; Zhao Ji; Zhang Lixin; Li Huzhao	Thailand (THA); Supachai Koysub; Saichon Konjen; Prawat Wahoram; Pichet Krungget	South Korea (KOR); Hong Suk-Man; Jung Dong-Ho; Kim Gyu-Dae; Yoo Byung-Hoon
4 × 400 m relay	4 × 400 m T53–T54	China (CHN); Cui Yanfeng; Zhao Ji; Li Huzhao; Zhang Lixin	Thailand (THA); Supachai Koysub; Prawat Wahoram; Pichet Krungget; Saichon Konjen	France (FRA); Julien Casoli; Pierre Fairbank; Alain Fuss; Denis Lemeunier
High jump	High jump F44/46	Jeff Skiba; United States	Aaron Chatman; Australia	Chen Hongjie; China
Long jump	Long jump F11	Li Duan; China	Lex Gillette; United States	Athanasios Barakas; Greece
Long jump	Long jump F12	Hilton Langenhoven; South Africa	Osamah Alshanqiti; Saudi Arabia	Oleg Panyutin; Azerbaijan
Long jump	Long jump F37–38	Farhat Chida; Tunisia	Haider Ali; Pakistan	Ma Yuxi; China
Long jump	Long jump F42/44	Wojtek Czyz; Germany	Atsushi Yamamoto; Japan	Casey Tibbs; United States
Long jump	Long jump F46	Arnaud Assoumani; France	David Roos; South Africa	Li Kangyong; China
Triple jump	Triple jump F11	Li Duan; China	Zeynidin Bilalov; Azerbaijan	Javier Porras; Spain
Triple jump	Triple jump F12	Osamah Alshanqiti; Saudi Arabia	Ivan Kytsenko; Ukraine	Vladimir Zayets; Azerbaijan
Club throw	Club throw F32/51	Mourad Idoudi; Tunisia	Stephen Miller; Great Britain	Jan Vanek; Czech Republic
Discus throw	Discus throw F11–12	Vasyl Lishchynskyi; Ukraine	Sebastian Baldassarri; Argentina	Oleksandr Iasynovyi; Ukraine
Discus throw	Discus throw F32/51	Mourad Idoudi; Tunisia	Jože Flere; Slovenia	Martin Zvolánek; Czech Republic
Discus throw	Discus throw F33–34/52	Aigars Apinis; Latvia	Chris Martin; Great Britain	Roman Musil; Czech Republic
Discus throw	Discus throw F35–36	Guo Wei; China	Wang Wenbo; China	Reginald Benade; Namibia
Discus throw	Discus throw F37–38	Javad Hardani; Iran	Mykola Zhabnyak; Ukraine	Xia Dong; China
Discus throw	Discus throw F42	Fanie Lombard; South Africa	Mehrdad Karamzadeh; Iran	Wang Lezheng; China
Discus throw	Discus throw F44	Jeremy Campbell; United States	Jackie Christiansen; Denmark	Daniel Greaves; Great Britain
Discus throw	Discus throw F53–54	Fan Liang; China	Draženko Mitrović; Serbia	Toshie Oi; Japan
Discus throw	Discus throw F55–56	Leonardo Diaz; Cuba	Ali Mohammadyari; Iran	Tanto Campbell; Jamaica
Discus throw	Discus throw F57–58	Alexey Ashapatov; Russia	Zheng Weihai; China	Rostislav Pohlmann; Croatia
Javelin throw	Javelin throw F11–12	Zhu Pengkai; China	Branimir Budetić; Croatia	Miroslaw Pych; Poland
Javelin throw	Javelin throw F33–34/52	Faouzi Rzig; Tunisia	Mohamed Krid; Tunisia	Jean-Pierre Talatini; France
Javelin throw	Javelin throw F35–36	Guo Wei; China	Pawel Piotrowski; Poland	Nicholas Newman; South Africa
Javelin throw	Javelin throw F37–38	Xia Dong; China	Zhang Xuelong; China	Javad Hardani; Iran
Javelin throw	Javelin throw F42/44	Gao Mingjie; China	Evengy Gudkov; Russia	Gao Changlong; China
Javelin throw	Javelin throw F53–54	Markku Niinimäki; Finland	Abdolreza Jokar; Iran	Luis Alberto Zepeda Félix; Mexico
Javelin throw	Javelin throw F55–56	Pieter Gruijters; Netherlands	Zhang Yingbin; China	Yaser Abdelaziz El Sayed; Egypt
Javelin throw	Javelin throw F57–58	Mohammad Reza Mirzaei; Iran	Mahmoud Ramadan Ellatar; Egypt	Rostislav Pohlmann; Czech Republic
Shot put	Shot put F11–12	David Casinos; Spain	Vladimir Andryushchenko; Russia	Vasyl Lishchynskyi; Ukraine
Shot put	Shot put F32	Karim Betina; Algeria	Mourad Idoudi; Tunisia	Mounir Bakiri; Algeria
Shot put	Shot put F33–34/52	Kamel Kardjena; Algeria	Aigars Apinis; Latvia	Kyle Pettey; Canada
Shot put	Shot put F35–36	Guo Wei; China	Edgars Bergs; Latvia	Pawel Piotrowski; Poland
Shot put	Shot put F37–38	Xia Dong; China	Tomasz Blatkiewicz; Poland	Thomas Loosch; Germany
Shot put	Shot put F40	Paschalis Stathelakos; Greece	Mathias Mester; Germany	Hocine Gherzouli; Algeria
Shot put	Shot put F42	Darko Kralj; Croatia	Maxim Narozhnyy; Russia	Fanie Lombard; South Africa
Shot put	Shot put F44	Jackie Christiansen; Denmark	Paul Raison; Australia	Gerdan Fonseca; Cuba
Shot put	Shot put F53–54	Mauro Maximo; Mexico	Markku Niinimäki; Finland	Che Jon Fernandes; Greece
Shot put	Shot put F55–56	Olokhan Musayev; Azerbaijan	Krzysztof Smorszczewski; Poland	Martin Němec; Czech Republic
Shot put	Shot put F57–58	Alexey Ashapatov; Russia	Jamil Elshebli; Jordan	Anastasios Tsiou; Greece
Pentathlon	Pentathlon P12	Hilton Langenhoven; South Africa	Thomas Ulbricht; Germany	Mahmoud Khaldi; Tunisia
Pentathlon	Pentathlon P44	Jeremy Campbell; United States	Jeff Skiba; United States	Urs Kolly; Switzerland

- *David Weir was initially awarded the gold medal in the men's 800 m T54 but a re-run of the race was ordered after a lane violation was discovered. However, following a letter from Kurt Fearnley and the Australian authorities to the IPC, asking that, in the spirit of sportsmanship, the result not be overturned the re-run was cancelled and the medals reinstated.

=== Women's events ===
Event	Class	Gold	Silver	Bronze
100 m	100 m T11	Wu Chunmiao; China	Terezinha Guilhermina; Brazil	Ádria Santos; Brazil
100 m	100 m T12	Oxana Boturchuk; Ukraine	Libby Clegg; Great Britain	Eva Ngui; Spain
100 m	100 m T13	Sanaa Benhama; Morocco	Ilse Hayes; South Africa	Alexandra Dimoglou; Greece
100 m	100 m T36	Wang Fang; China	Claudia Nicoleitzik; Germany	Hazel Simpson; Great Britain
100 m	100 m T37	Lisa McIntosh; Australia	Viktoriya Kravchenko; Ukraine	Maria Seifert; Germany
100 m	100 m T38	Inna Dyachenko; Ukraine	Sonia Mansour; Tunisia	Margarita Koptilova; Russia
100 m	100 m T42	Perla Bustamante; Mexico	Annette Roozen; Netherlands	Christine Wolf; Australia
100 m	100 m T44	April Holmes; United States	Amélie Le Fur; France	Wang Juan; China
100 m	100 m T46	Yunidis Castillo; Cuba	Elena Chistilina; Russia	Alicja Fiodorow; Poland
100 m	100 m T52	Michelle Stilwell; Canada	Tomomi Yamaki; Japan	Teruyo Tanaka; Japan
100 m	100 m T53	Huang Lisha; China	Jessica Galli; United States	Ilana Duff; Canada
100 m	100 m T54	Chantal Petitclerc; Canada	Liu Wenjun; China	Dong Hongjiao; China
200 m	200 m T11	Terezinha Guilhermina; Brazil	Wu Chunmiao; China	Jerusa Santos; Brazil
200 m	200 m T12	Assia El'Hannouni; France	Oxana Boturchuk; Ukraine	Eva Ngui; Spain
200 m	200 m T13	Sanaa Benhama; Morocco	Nantenin Keita; France	Alexandra Dimoglou; Greece
200 m	200 m T36	Wang Fang; China	Claudia Nicoleitzik; Germany	Hazel Simpson; Great Britain
200 m	200 m T37	Lisa McIntosh; Australia	Viktoriya Kravchenko; Ukraine	Maria Seifert; Germany
200 m	200 m T38	Inna Dyachenko; Ukraine	Sonia Mansour; Tunisia	Margarita Koptilova; Russia
200 m	200 m T44	Katrin Green; Germany	Kate Horan; New Zealand	Stefanie Reid; Canada
200 m	200 m T46	Yunidis Castillo; Cuba	Alicja Fiodorow; Poland	Julie Smith; Australia
200 m	200 m T52	Michelle Stilwell; Canada	Tomomi Yamaki; Japan	Pia Schmid; Switzerland
200 m	200 m T53	Huang Lisha; China	Jessica Galli; United States	Zhou Hongzhuan; China
200 m	200 m T54	Chantal Petitclerc; Canada	Tatyana McFadden; United States	Manuela Schar; Switzerland
400 m	400 m T12	Assia El'Hannouni; France	Oxana Boturchuk; Ukraine	Terezinha Guilhermina; Brazil
400 m	400 m T13	Sanaa Benhama; Morocco	Alexandra Dimoglou; Greece	Nantenin Keita; France
400 m	400 m T53	Jessica Galli; United States	Zhou Hongzhuan; China	Anjali Forber-Pratt; United States
400 m	400 m T54	Chantal Petitclerc; Canada	Tatyana McFadden; United States	Diane Roy; Canada
800 m	800 m T12–13	Somaya Bousaid; Tunisia	Assia El'Hannouni; France	Elenna Pautova; Russia
800 m	800 m T53	Zhou Hongzhuan; China	Jessica Galli; United States	Amanda McGrory; United States
800 m	800 m T54	Chantal Petitclerc; Canada	Tatyana McFadden; United States	Diane Roy; Canada
1500 m	1500 m T13	Somaya Bousaid; Tunisia	Assia El'Hannouni; France	Elenna Pautova; Russia
1500 m	1500 m T54	Chantal Petitclerc; Canada	Shelly Woods; Great Britain	Edith Hunkeler; Switzerland
5000 m	5000 m T54 †	Amanda McGrory; United States	Diane Roy; Canada	Shelly Woods; Great Britain
Marathon	Marathon T54	Edith Hunkeler; Switzerland	Amanda McGrory; United States	Sandra Graf; Switzerland
4 × 100 m	4 × 100 m T53–T54	China (CHN); Dong Hongjiao; Liu Wenjun; Huang Lisha; Zhang Ting	Australia (AUS); Madison de Rozario; Christie Dawes; Angie Ballard; Jemima Moore	United States (USA); Tatyana McFadden; Anjali Forber-Pratt; Amanda McGrory; Jessica Galli
Long jump	Long jump F12	Oksana Zubkovska; Ukraine	Volha Zinkevich; Belarus	Liu Miaomiao; China
Long jump	Long jump F13	Ilse Hayes; South Africa	Anthi Karagianni; Greece	Svitlana Gorbenko; Ukraine
Long jump	Long jump F42	Christine Wolf; Australia	Annette Roozen; Netherlands	Ewa Zielinska; Poland
Long jump	Long jump F44	Andrea Scherney; Austria	Amélie Le Fur; France	Astrid Hofte; Germany
Discus throw	Discus throw F12–13	Tamara Sivakova; Belarus	Zhang Liangmin; China	Elizabeth Almada; Argentina
Discus throw	Discus throw F32–34/51–53	Tetyana Yakybchuk; Ukraine	Frances Herrmann; Germany	Yousra Ben Jemaa; Tunisia
Discus throw	Discus throw F35–36	Wu Qing; China	Kath Proudfoot; Australia	Alla Malchyk; Ukraine
Discus throw	Discus throw F37–38 ††	Mi Na; China	Amanda Fraser; Australia	Li Chunhua; China
Discus throw	Discus throw F40	Menggenjimisu; China	Raoua Tlili; Tunisia	Najat El Garaa; Morocco
Discus throw	Discus throw F42–46	Wang Jun; China	Yang Yue; China	Zheng Baozhu; China
Discus throw	Discus throw F54–56	Marianne Buggenhagen; Germany	Wang Ting; China	Jana Fesslova; Czech Republic
Discus throw	Discus throw F57–58	Eucharia Njideka Iyiazi; Nigeria	Stela Eneva; Bulgaria	Nadia Medjemedj; Algeria
Javelin throw	Javelin throw F33–34/52–53	Antonia Balek; Croatia	Louadjeda Benoumessad; Algeria	Birgit Pohl; Germany
Javelin throw	Javelin throw F35–38	Wu Qing; China	Shirlene Coelho; Brazil	Renata Chilewska; Poland
Javelin throw	Javelin throw F42–46	Yao Juan; China	Andrea Hegen; Germany	Madeleine Hogan; Australia
Javelin throw	Javelin throw F54–56	Martina Monika Willing; Germany	Hania Aidi; Tunisia	Daniela Todorova; Bulgaria
Javelin throw	Javelin throw F57–58	Qing Suping; China	Nakhumicha Zakayo; Kenya	Jeny Velazco; Mexico
Shot put	Shot put F12–13	Tang Hongxia; China	Tamara Sivakova; Belarus	Jodi Willis-Roberts; Australia
Shot put	Shot put F32–34/52–53	Antonia Balek; Croatia	Birgit Pohl; Germany	Maria Stamatoula; Greece
Shot put	Shot put F35–36	Alla Malchyk; Ukraine	Wu Qing; China	Renata Chilewska; Poland
Shot put	Shot put F37–38	Mi Na; China	Aldona Grigaliuniene; Lithuania	Eva Berna; Czech Republic
Shot put	Shot put F40	Raoua Tlili; Tunisia	Menggenjimisu; China	Laila El Garaa; Morocco
Shot put	Shot put F42–46	Zheng Baozhu; China	Zhong Yongyuan; China	Michaela Floeth; Germany
Shot put	Shot put F54–56	Eva Kacanu; Czech Republic	Martina Monika Willing; Germany	Marianne Buggenhagen; Germany
Shot put	Shot put F57–58	Eucharia Njideka Iyiazi; Nigeria	Angeles Ortiz Hernandez; Mexico	Nadia Medjemedj; Algeria

† Diane Roy was initially awarded the gold, Shelly Woods the silver and Amanda McGrory the bronze in the women's 5000 m T54. However a re-run of the race was ordered by the International Paralympic Committee following protests by the Australian, US and Swiss teams after 6 competitors were involved in a crash on the penultimate lap. The re-run race resulted in the same three athletes winning medals but in a different order.

†† Rebecca Chin of Great Britain was originally awarded the silver medal in the women's discus throw F37-38 event. Following a challenge to her classification, Chin was deemed ineligible for the event, stripped of her medal, and her results were erased.

== See also ==
- Athletics at the 2008 Summer Olympics
