= List of 2008 Summer Paralympics medal winners =

The 2008 Summer Paralympics were held in Beijing, People's Republic of China, from 6 to 17 September 2008. Approximately 3,951 athletes from 146 National Paralympic Committees (NPC) participated. Overall, 472 events in 20 sports were held; 262 events were opened to men, 176 were opened to women and 34 were mixed events.

== Archery ==
Event	Gold	Silver	Bronze
Women's individual compound open	Danielle Brown; Great Britain	Chieko Kamiya; Japan	Mel Clarke; Great Britain
Women's individual recurve standing	Lee Hwa-Sook; South Korea	Gao Fangxia; China	Lindsey Carmichael; United States
Women's individual recurve W1/W2	Gizem Girişmen; Turkey	Fu Hongzhi; China	Xiao Yanhong; China
Women's team recurve open	China (CHN); Fu Hongzhi; Goa Fangxia; Xiao Yanhong	South Korea (KOR); Kim Ki-Hee; Kim Ran-Sook; Lee Hwa-Sook	Czech Republic (CZE); Miroslava Cerna; Lenka Kuncova; Marketa Sidkova
Men's individual compound open	John Stubbs; Great Britain	Alberto Simonelli; Italy	Philip Horner; Switzerland
Men's individual compound W1	David Drahonisky; Czech Republic	John Cavanagh; Great Britain	Jeff Fabry; United States
Men's individual recurve standing	Baatarjav Dambadondog; Mongolia	Fabrice Meunier; France	Chen Yegang; China
Men's individual recurve W1/W2	Cheng Changjie; China	Marco Vitale; Italy	Tseng Lung-Hui; Chinese Taipei
Men's team recurve open	South Korea (KOR); Jung Young-Joo; Lee Hong-Gu; Yoon Young-Bae	China (CHN); Chen Yegang; Cheng Changjie; Dong Zhi	Italy (ITA); Oscar de Pellegrin; Mario Esposito; Marco Vitale

== Athletics ==
Event	Gold	Silver	Bronze
Women's 100 m T11	Wu Chunmiao; China	Terezinha Guilhermina; Brazil	Adria Santos; Brazil
Women's 100 m T12	Oxana Boturchuk; Ukraine	Libby Clegg; Great Britain	Eva Ngui; Spain
Women's 100 m T13	Sanaa Benhama; Morocco	Ilse Hayes; South Africa	Alexandra Dimoglou; Greece
Women's 100 m T36	Wang Fang; China	Claudia Nicoleitzik; Germany	Hazel Simpson; Great Britain
Women's 100 m T37	Lisa McIntosh; Australia	Viktoriya Kravchenko; Ukraine	Maria Seifert; Germany
Women's 100 m T38	Inna Dyachenko; Ukraine	Sonia Mansour; Tunisia	Margarita Koptilova; Russia
Women's 100 m T42	Perla Bustamante; Mexico	Annette Roozen; Netherlands	Christine Wolf; Australia
Women's 100 m T44	April Holmes; United States	Amélie Le Fur; France	Wang Juan; China
Women's 100 m T46	Yunidis Castillo; Cuba	Elena Chistilina; Russia	Alicja Fiodorow; Poland
Women's 100 m T52	Michelle Stilwell; Canada	Tomomi Yamaki; Japan	Teruyo Tanaka; Japan
Women's 100 m T53	Huang Lisha; China	Jessica Galli; United States	Ilana Duff; Canada
Women's 100 m T54	Chantal Petitclerc; Canada	Liu Wenjun; China	Dong Hongjiao; China
Women's 200 m T11	Terezinha Guilhermina; Brazil	Wu Chunmiao; China	Jerusa Santos; Brazil
Women's 200 m T12	Assia El'Hannouni; France	Oxana Boturchuk; Ukraine	Eva Ngui; Spain
Women's 200 m T13	Sanaa Benhama; Morocco	Nantenin Keïta; France	Alexandra Dimoglou; Greece
Women's 200 m T36	Wang Fang; China	Claudia Nicoleitzik; Germany	Hazel Simpson; Great Britain
Women's 200 m T37	Lisa McIntosh; Australia	Viktoriya Kravchenko; Ukraine	Maria Seifert; Germany
Women's 200 m T38	Inna Dyachenko; Ukraine	Sonia Mansour; Tunisia	Margarita Koptilova; Russia
Women's 200 m T44	Katrin Green; Germany	Kate Horan; New Zealand	Stefanie Reid; Canada
Women's 200 m T46	Yunidis Castillo; Cuba	Alicja Fiodorow; Poland	Julie Smith; Australia
Women's 200 m T52	Michelle Stilwell; Canada	Tomomi Yamaki; Japan	Pia Schmid; Switzerland
Women's 200 m T53	Huang Lisha; China	Jessica Galli; United States	Zhou Hongzhuan; China
Women's 200 m T54	Chantal Petitclerc; Canada	Tatyana McFadden; United States	Manuela Schar; Switzerland
Women's 400 m T12	Assia El'Hannouni; France	Oxana Boturchuk; Ukraine	Terezinha Guilhermina; Brazil
Women's 400 m T13	Sanaa Benhama; Morocco	Alexandra Dimoglou; Greece	Nantenin Keïta; France
Women's 400 m T53	Jessica Galli; United States	Zhou Hongzhuan; China	Anjali Forber-Pratt; United States
Women's 400 m T54	Chantal Petitclerc; Canada	Tatyana McFadden; United States	Diane Roy; Canada
Women's 800 m T12–13	Somaya Bousaid; Tunisia	Assia El'Hannouni; France	Elenna Pautova; Russia
Women's 800 m T53	Zhou Hongzhuan; China	Jessica Galli; United States	Amanda McGrory; United States
Women's 800 m T54	Chantal Petitclerc; Canada	Tatyana McFadden; United States	Diane Roy; Canada
Women's 1500 m T13	Somaya Bousaid; Tunisia	Assia El'Hannouni; France	Elenna Pautova; Russia
Women's 1500 m T54	Chantal Petitclerc; Canada	Shelly Woods; Great Britain	Edith Hunkeler; Switzerland
Women's 5000 m T54 †	Amanda McGrory; United States	Diane Roy; Canada	Shelly Woods; Great Britain
Women's Marathon T54	Edith Hunkeler; Switzerland	Amanda McGrory; United States	Sandra Graf; Switzerland
Women's 4×100 m T53–T54	China (CHN); Dong Hongjiao; Liu Wenjun; Huang Lisha; Zhang Ting	Australia (AUS); Madison de Rozario; Christie Dawes; Angie Ballard; Jemima Moore	United States (USA); Tatyana McFadden; Anjali Forber-Pratt; Amanda McGrory; Jessica Galli
Women's Long jump F12	Oksana Zubkovska; Ukraine	Volha Zinkevich; Belarus	Liu Miaomiao; China
Women's Long jump F13	Ilse Hayes; South Africa	Anthi Karagianni; Greece	Svitlana Gorbenko; Ukraine
Women's Long jump F42	Christine Wolf; Australia	Annette Roozen; Netherlands	Ewa Zielinska; Poland
Women's Long jump F44	Andrea Scherney; Austria	Amélie Le Fur; France	Astrid Hofte; Germany
Women's discus throw F12–13	Tamara Sivakova; Belarus	Zhang Liangmin; China	Elizabeth Almada; Argentina
Women's discus throw F32–34/51–53	Tetyana Yakybchuk; Ukraine	Frances Herrmann; Germany	Yousra Ben Jemaa; Tunisia
Women's discus throw F35–36	Wu Qing; China	Kath Proudfoot; Australia	Alla Malchyk; Ukraine
Women's discus throw F37–38 ††	Mi Na; China	Amanda Fraser; Australia	Li Chunhua; China
Women's discus throw F40	Menggenjimisu; China	Raoua Tlili; Tunisia	Najat El Garaa; Morocco
Women's discus throw F42–46	Wang Jun; China	Yang Yue; China	Zheng Baozhu; China
Women's discus throw F54–56	Marianne Buggenhagen; Germany	Wang Ting; China	Jana Fesslova; Czech Republic
Women's discus throw F57–58	Eucharia Njideka Iyiazi; Nigeria	Stela Eneva; Bulgaria	Nadia Medjemedj; Algeria
Women's javelin throw F33–34/52–53	Antonia Balek; Croatia	Louadjeda Benoumessad; Algeria	Birgit Pohl; Germany
Women's javelin throw F35–38	Wu Qing; China	Shirlene Coelho; Brazil	Renata Chilewska; Poland
Women's javelin throw F42–46	Yao Juan; China	Andrea Hegen; Germany	Madeleine Hogan; Australia
Women's javelin throw F54–56	Martina Monika Willing; Germany	Hania Aidi; Tunisia	Daniela Todorova; Bulgaria
Women's javelin throw F57–58	Qing Suping; China	Nakhumicha Zakayo; Kenya	Jeny Velazco; Mexico
Women's shot put F12–13	Tang Hongxia; China	Tamara Sivakova; Belarus	Jodi Willis-Roberts; Australia
Women's shot put F32–34/52–53	Antonia Balek; Croatia	Birgit Pohl; Germany	Maria Stamatoula; Greece
Women's shot put F35–36	Alla Malchyk; Ukraine	Wu Qing; China	Renata Chilewska; Poland
Women's shot put F37–38	Mi Na; China	Aldona Grigaliuniene; Lithuania	Eva Berna; Czech Republic
Women's shot put F40	Raoua Tlili; Tunisia	Menggenjimisu; China	Laila El Garaa; Morocco
Women's shot put F42–46	Zheng Baozhu; China	Zhong Yongyuan; China	Michaela Floeth; Germany
Women's shot put F54–56	Eva Kacanu; Czech Republic	Martina Monika Willing; Germany	Marianne Buggenhagen; Germany
Women's shot put F57–58	Eucharia Njideka Iyiazi; Nigeria	Angeles Ortiz; Mexico	Nadia Medjemedj; Algeria
Men's 100 m T11	Lucas Prado; Brazil	Jose Armando; Angola	Tresor Makunda; France
Men's 100 m T12	Josiah Jamison; United States	Adekunle Adesoji; Nigeria	Yang Yuqing; China
Men's 100 m T13	Jason Smyth; Ireland	Alexy Labzin; Russia	Luis Felipe Gutierrez; Cuba
Men's 100 m T35	Yang Sen; China	Fu Xinhan; China	Teboho Mokgalagadi; South Africa
Men's 100 m T36	Roman Pavlyk; Ukraine	Ben Rushgrove; Great Britain	So Wa Wai; Hong Kong
Men's 100 m T37	Fanie van der Merwe; South Africa	Ma Yuxi; China	Sofiane Hamdi; Algeria
Men's 100 m T38	Evan O'Hanlon; Australia	Zhou Wenjun; China	Mykyta Senyk; Ukraine
Men's 100 m T42	Earle Connor; Canada	Heinrich Popow; Germany	John McFall; Great Britain
Men's 100 m T44	Oscar Pistorius; South Africa	Jerome Singleton; United States	Brian Frasure; United States
Men's 100 m T46	Heath Francis; Australia	Francis Kompaon; Papua New Guinea	Yohansson Nascimento; Brazil
Men's 100 m T52	Dean Bergeron; Canada	Beat Bosch; Switzerland	Andre Beaudoin; Canada
Men's 100 m T53	Josh George; United States	Mickey Bushell; Great Britain	Yu Shiran; China
Men's 100 m T54	Leo-Pekka Tahti; Finland	Saichon Konjen; Thailand	Supachai Koysub; Thailand
Men's 200 m T11	Lucas Prado; Brazil	Jose Armando; Angola	Arian Iznaga; Cuba
Men's 200 m T12	Hilton Langenhoven; South Africa	Li Yansong; China	Yang Yuqing; China
Men's 200 m T13	Jason Smyth; Ireland	Alexy Labzin; Russia	Vugar Mehdiyev; Azerbaijan
Men's 200 m T36	So Wa Wai; Hong Kong	Roman Pavlyk; Ukraine	Che Mian; China
Men's 200 m T37	Fanie van der Merwe; South Africa	Sofiane Hamdi; Algeria	Ma Yuxi; China
Men's 200 m T38	Evan O'Hanlon; Australia	Zhou Wenjun; China	Mykyta Senyk; Ukraine
Men's 200 m T44	Oscar Pistorius; South Africa	Jim Bob Bizzell; United States	Ian Jones; Great Britain
Men's 200 m T46	Heath Francis; Australia	Antonis Aresti; Cyprus	Ettiam Calderon; Cuba
Men's 200 m T52	Dean Bergeron; Canada	Beat Bosch; Switzerland	Peth Rungsri; Thailand
Men's 200 m T53	Yu Shiran; China	Richard Colman; Australia	Hong Suk-Man; South Korea
Men's 200 m T54	Zhang Lixin; China	Saichon Konjen; Thailand	Leo-Pekka Tahti; Finland
Men's 400 m T11	Lucas Prado; Brazil	Jose Armando; Angola	Oleksandr Ivaniukhin; Ukraine
Men's 400 m T12	Li Yansong; China	Matthias Schroder; Germany	Luis Goncalves; Portugal
Men's 400 m T13	Luis Manuel Galano; Cuba	Freddy Durruthy; Cuba	Ioannis Protos; Greece
Men's 400 m T36	Roman Pavlyk; Ukraine	Artem Arefyev; Russia	Che Mian; China
Men's 400 m T38	Farhat Chida; Tunisia	Abbes Saidi; Tunisia	Andriy Onufriyenko; Ukraine
Men's 400 m T44	Oscar Pistorius; South Africa	Jim Bob Bizzell; United States	Ian Jones; Great Britain
Men's 400 m T46	Heath Francis; Australia	Antonis Aresti; Cyprus	Samuel Colmenares; Venezuela
Men's 400 m T52	Tomoya Ito; Japan	Toshihiro Takada; Japan	Dean Bergeron; Canada
Men's 400 m T53	Hong Suk-Man; South Korea	Li Huzhao; China	Richard Colman; Australia
Men's 400 m T54	Zhang Lixin; China	David Weir; Great Britain	Saichon Konjen; Thailand
Men's 800 m T12	Abderrahim Zhiou; Tunisia	Lazaro Raschid Aguilar; Cuba	Odair Santos; Brazil
Men's 800 m T13	Abdelillah Mame; Morocco	Peter Gottwald Jr. United States	Zine Eddine Sekhri; Algeria
Men's 800 m T36	Artem Arefyev; Russia	He Chengen; China	Pavel Kharagezov; Russia
Men's 800 m T37	Michael McKillop; Ireland	Brad Scott; Australia	Djamel Mastouri; France
Men's 800 m T46	Marcin Awizen; Poland	Samir Nouioua; Algeria	Abderrahman Ait Khamouch; Spain
Men's 800 m T52	Tomoya Ito; Japan	Toshihiro Takada; Japan	Thomas Geierspichler; Austria
Men's 800 m T53	Li Huzhao; China	Josh George; United States	Hong Suk-Man; South Korea
Men's 800 m T54*	David Weir; Great Britain	Kurt Fearnley; Australia	Prawat Wahoram; Thailand
Men's 1500 m T11	Zhang Zhen; China	Samwel Mushai Kimani; Kenya	Jason Dunkerley; Canada
Men's 1500 m T13	Henry Kiprono Kirwa; Kenya	Lazaro Raschid Aguilar; Cuba	Ignacio Avila; Spain
Men's 1500 m T46	Abraham Cheruiyot Tarbei; Kenya	Abderrahman Ait Khamouch; Spain	Samir Nouioua; Algeria
Men's 1500 m T54	David Weir; Great Britain	Prawat Wahoram; Thailand	Kurt Fearnley; Australia
Men's 5000 m T11	Zhang Zhen; China	Francis Thuo Karanja; Kenya	Henry Wanyoike; Kenya
Men's 5000 m T13	Henry Kiprono Kirwa; Kenya	Youssef Benibrahim; Morocco	Odair Santos; Brazil
Men's 5000 m T46	Abraham Cheruiyot Tarbei; Kenya	Mohamed Fouzai; Tunisia	Mario Santillan; Mexico
Men's 5000 m T54	Prawat Wahoram; Thailand	Kurt Fearnley; Australia	David Weir; Great Britain
Men's 10000 m T12	Henry Kiprono Kirwa; Kenya	Abderrahim Zhiou; Tunisia	Odair Santos; Brazil
Men's Marathon T12	Qi Shun; China	Elkin Serna; Colombia	Ildar Pomykalov; Russia
Men's Marathon T46	Mario Santillan; Mexico	Tito Sena; Brazil	Walter Endrizzi; Italy
Men's Marathon T52	Thomas Geierspichler; Austria	Hirokazu Ueyonabaru; Japan	Toshihiro Takada; Japan
Men's Marathon T54	Kurt Fearnley; Australia	Hiroki Sasahara; Japan	Ernst van Dyk; South Africa
Men's 4×100 m T11–T13	China (CHN); Liu Xiangkun; Li Qiang; Yang Yuqing; Li Yansong	Venezuela (VEN); Yoldani Silva; Ricardo Santana; Oduver Daza; Fernando Ferrer	France (FRA); Tresor Makunda; Pasquale Gallo; Stephane Bozzolo; Ronan Pallier
Men's 4×100 m T35–T38	Australia (AUS); Evan O'Hanlon; Darren Thrupp; Christopher Mullins; Timothy Sullivan	China (CHN); Che Mian; Zhou Wenjun; Yang Chen; Ma Yuxi	Tunisia (TUN); Fares Hamdi; Abbes Saidi; Mohamed Charmi; Farhat Chida
Men's 4×100 m T42–T46	United States (USA); Jim Bob Bizzell; Brian Frasure; Casey Tibbs; Jerome Singleton	Brazil (BRA); Andre Luiz Oliveira; Yohansson Nascimento; Claudemir Santos; Alan Fonteles Cardoso Oliveira	Australia (AUS); Heath Francis; Stephen Wilson; Aaron Chatman; Paul Raison
Men's 4×100 m T53–T54	China (CHN); Zong Kai; Zhao Ji; Zhang Lixin; Li Huzhao	Thailand (THA); Supachai Koysub; Saichon Konjen; Prawat Wahoram; Pichet Krungget	South Korea (KOR); Hong Suk-Man; Jung Dong-Ho; Kim Gyu-Dae; Yoo Byung-Hoon
Men's 4×400 m T53–T54	China (CHN); Cui Yanfeng; Zhao Ji; Li Huzhao; Zhang Lixin	Thailand (THA); Supachai Koysub; Prawat Wahoram; Pichet Krungget; Saichon Konjen	France (FRA); Julien Casoli; Pierre Fairbank; Alain Fuss; Denis Lemeunier
Men's High jump F44/46	Jeff Skiba; United States	Aaron Chatman; Australia	Chen Hongjie; China
Men's Long jump F11	Li Duan; China	Lex Gillette; United States	Athanasios Barakas; Greece
Men's Long jump F12	Hilton Langenhoven; South Africa	Osamah Alshanqiti; Saudi Arabia	Oleg Panyutin; Azerbaijan
Men's long jump F37–38	Farhat Chida; Tunisia	Haider Ali; Pakistan	Ma Yuxi; China
Men's long jump F42/44	Wojtek Czyz; Poland	Atsushi Yamamoto; Japan	Casey Tibbs; United States
Men's long jump F46	Arnaud Assoumani; France	David Roos; South Africa	Li Kangyong; China
Men's triple jump F11	Li Duan; China	Zeynidin Bilalov; Azerbaijan	Javier Porras; Spain
Men's triple jump F12	Osamah Alshanqiti; Saudi Arabia	Ivan Kytsenko; Ukraine	Vladimir Zayets; Azerbaijan
Men's club throw F32/51	Mourad Idoudi; Tunisia	Stephen Miller; Great Britain	Jan Vanek; Czech Republic
Men's discus throw F11–12	Vasyl Lishchynskyi; Ukraine	Sebastian Baldassarri; Argentina	Oleksandr Iasynovyi; Ukraine
Men's discus throw F32/51	Mourad Idoudi; Tunisia	Joze Flere; Slovenia	Martin Zvolanek; Czech Republic
Men's discus throw F33–34/52	Aigars Apinis; Latvia	Chris Martin; Great Britain	Roman Musil; Czech Republic
Men's discus throw F35–36	Guo Wei; China	Wang Wenbo; China	Reginald Benade; Namibia
Men's discus throw F37–38	Javad Hardani; Iran	Mykola Zhabnyak; Ukraine	Xia Dong; China
Men's discus throw F42	Fanie Lombard; South Africa	Mehrdad Karamzadeh; Iran	Wang Lezheng; China
Men's discus throw F44	Jeremy Campbell; United States	Jackie Christiansen; Denmark	Daniel Greaves; Great Britain
Men's discus throw F53–54	Fang Liang; China	Drazenko Mitrovic; Serbia	Toshie Oi; Japan
Men's discus throw F55–56	Leonardo Diaz; Cuba	Ali Mohammadyari; Iran	Tanto Campbell; Jamaica
Men's discus throw F57–58	Alexy Ashapatov; Russia	Zheng Weihai; China	Rostislav Pohlmann; Croatia
Men's javelin throw F11–12	Zhu Pengkai; China	Branimir Budetic; Croatia	Miroslaw Pych; Poland
Men's javelin throw F33–34/52	Faouzi Rzig; Tunisia	Mohamed Krid; Tunisia	Jean-Pierre Talatini; France
Men's javelin throw F35–36	Guo Wei; China	Pawel Piotrowski; Poland	Nicholas Newman; South Africa
Men's javelin throw F37–38	Xia Dong; China	Zhang Xuelong; China	Javad Hardani; Iran
Men's javelin throw F42/44	Gao Mingjie; China	Evengy Gudkov; Russia	Gao Changlong; China
Men's javelin throw F53–54	Markku Niinimäki; Finland	Abdolreza Jokar; Iran	Luis Alberto Zepeda Félix; Mexico
Men's javelin throw F55–56	Pieter Gruijters; Netherlands	Zhang Yingbin; China	Yaser Abdelaziz El Sayed; Egypt
Men's javelin throw F57–58	Mohammad Reza Mirzaei; Iran	MR Ellatar; Egypt	Rostislav Pohlmann; Czech Republic
Men's shot put F11–12	David Casinos; Spain	V Andryushchenko; Russia	Vasyl Lishchynskyi; Ukraine
Men's shot put F32	Karim Betina; Algeria	Mourad Idoudi; Tunisia	Mounir Bakiri; Algeria
Men's shot put F33–34/52	Kamel Kardjena; Algeria	Aigars Apinis; Latvia	Kyle Pettey; Canada
Men's shot put F35–36	Guo Wei; China	Edgars Bergs; Latvia	Pawel Piotrowski; Poland
Men's shot put F37–38	Xia Dong; China	Tomasz Blatkiewicz; Poland	Thomas Loosch; Germany
Men's shot put F40	Paschalis Stathelakos; Greece	Mathias Mester; Germany	Hocine Gherzouli; Algeria
Men's shot put F42	Darko Kralj; Croatia	Maxim Narozhnyy; Russia	Fanie Lombard; South Africa
Men's shot put F44	Jackie Christiansen; Denmark	Paul Raison; Australia	Gerdan Fonseca; Cuba
Men's shot put F53–54	Mauro Maximo; Mexico	Markku Niinimaki; Finland	Che Jon Fernandes; Greece
Men's shot put F55–56	Olokhan Musayev; Azerbaijan	K Smorszczewski; Poland	Martin Němec; Czech Republic
Men's shot put F57–58	Alexey Ashapatov; Russia	Jamil Elshebli; Jordan	Anastasios Tsiou; Greece
Men's pentathlon P12	Hilton Langenhoven; South Africa	Thomas Ulbricht; Germany	Mahmoud Khaldi; Tunisia
Men's pentathlon P44	Jeremy Campbell; United States	Jeff Skiba; United States	Urs Kolly; Switzerland

† Diane Roy was initially awarded the gold, Shelly Woods the silver and Amanda McGrory the bronze in the women's 5000 m T54. However a re-run of the race was ordered by the International Paralympic Committee following protests by the Australian, US and Swiss teams after 6 competitors were involved in a crash on the penultimate lap. The re-run race resulted in the same three athletes winning medals but in a different order.

†† Rebecca Chin of Great Britain was originally awarded the silver medal in the women's discus throw F37–38 event. Following a challenge to her classification, Chin was deemed ineligible for the event, stripped of her medal, and her results were erased.

* David Weir was initially awarded the gold medal in the men's 800 m T54 but a re-run of the race was ordered after a lane violation was discovered. However, following a letter from Kurt Fearnley and the Australian authorities to the IPC, asking that, in the spirit of sportsmanship, the result not be overturned the re-run was cancelled and the medals reinstated.

== Boccia ==
Event	Gold	Silver	Bronze
Individual BC1	Joao Paulo Fernandes; Portugal	Antonio Marques; Portugal	Gabriel Shelly; Ireland
Individual BC2	Hoi Ying Karen Kwok; Hong Kong	Nigel Murray; Great Britain	Manuel Ángel Martín; Spain
Individual BC3	Keon-Woo Park; South Korea	Grigorios Polychronidis; Greece	Ho-Won Jeong; South Korea
Individual BC4	Dirceu Pinto; Brazil	Yuk Wing Leung; Hong Kong	Eliseu Santos; Brazil
Team BC1-2	Great Britain (GBR); Dan Bentley; Nigel Murray; Zoe Robinson; David Smith	Portugal (POR); Joao Paulo Fernandes; Fernando Ferreira; Cristina Gonçalves; Antonio Marques	Spain (ESP); Francisco Javier Beltrán; Pedro Cordero; Manuel Ángel Martín; José Vaquerizo
Pairs BC3	South Korea (KOR); Ho-Won Jeong; Keon-Woo Park; Bo-Mee Shin	Spain (ESP); Yolanda Martín; Santiago Pesquera; José Manuel Rodríguez	Portugal (POR); Armando Costa; Mário Peixoto; Eunice Raimundo
Pairs BC4	Brazil (BRA); Dirceu Pinto; Eliseu Santos	Portugal (POR); Fernando Pereira; Bruno Valentim	Czech Republic (CZE); Ladislav Kratina; Radek Prochazka

== Cycling ==
=== Road cycling ===
Event	Gold	Silver	Bronze
Women's time trial B&VI 1–3	United States (USA); Karissa Whitsell; Mackenzie Woodring	Belarus (BLR); Iryna Fiadotava; Alena Drazdova	New Zealand (NZL); Jayne Parsons; Annaliisa Farrell
Women's time trial HC A/B/C	Rachel Morris; Great Britain	Monique van der Vorst; Netherlands	Dorothee Vieth; Germany
Women's time trial LC 1–2/CP 4	Sarah Storey; Great Britain	Jennifer Schuble; United States	Jufang Zhou; China
Women's time trial LC 3–4/CP 3	Barbara Buchan; United States	Allison Jones; United States	Paula Tesoriero; New Zealand
Women's road race B&VI 1–3	Belarus (BLR); Iryna Fiadotava; Alena Drazdova	United States (USA); Karissa Whitsell; Mackenzie Woodring	Canada (CAN); Genevieve Ouellet; Mathilde Hupin
Women's road race HC A/B/C	Andrea Eskau; Germany	Monique van der Vorst; Netherlands	Dorothee Vieth; Germany
Men's time trial B&VI 1–3	Spain (ESP); Christian Venge; David Llaurado	Netherlands (NED); Alfred Stelleman; Jaco Tettelaar	Poland (POL); Krzysztof Kosikowski; Artur Korc
Men's time trial CP 3	Javier Otxoa; Spain	Darren Kenny; Great Britain	Yong-Sik Jin; South Korea
Men's time trial CP 4	Cesar Neira; Spain	Christopher Scott; Australia	Masashi Ishii; Japan
Men's time trial HC A	Wolfgang Schattauer; Austria	Rastislav Turecek; Slovakia	Alain Quittet; France
Men's time trial HC B	Heinz Frei; Switzerland	Vittorio Podestà; Italy	Edward Maalouf; Lebanon
Men's time trial HC C	Oz Sanchez; United States	José Vicente Arzo; Spain	Alejandro Albor; United States
Men's time trial LC1	Wolfgang Sacher; Germany	Wolfgang Eibeck; Austria	Fabio Triboli; Italy
Men's time trial LC2	Jiří Ježek; Czech Republic	Carol-Eduard Novak; Romania	Roberto Alcaide; Spain
Men's time trial LC3	Laurent Thirionet; France	Simon Richardson; Great Britain	Masaki Fujita; Japan
Men's time trial LC4	Michael Teuber; Germany	Juan José Méndez; Spain	Anthony Zahn; United States
Men's road race B&VI 1–3	Poland (POL); Andrzej Zajac; Dariusz Flak	Finland (FIN); Jarmo Ollanketo; Marko Tormanen	France (FRA); Olivier Donval; John Saccomandi
Men's road race HC B	Heinz Frei; Switzerland	Max Weber; Germany	Edward Maalouf; Lebanon
Men's road race HC C	Ernst van Dyk; South Africa	Alejandro Albor; United States	Oz Sanchez; United States
Men's road race LC 1–2/CP 4	Fabio Triboli; Italy	David Mercier; France	Michael Gallagher; Australia
Men's road race LC 3–4/CP 3	Darren Kenny; Great Britain	Javier Otxoa; Spain	Tomas Kvasnicka; Czech Republic
Mixed time trial CP 1–2	David Stone; Great Britain	Barbara Weise; Germany	Marketa Mackova; Czech Republic
Mixed road race CP 1–2	David Stone; Great Britain	Riaan Nel; South Africa	Giorgio Farroni; Italy

=== Track cycling ===
Event	Gold	Silver	Bronze
Women's 500m time trial (LC1–2/CP 4)	Jennifer Schuble; United States	Ye Yaping; China	Dong Jingping; China
Women's 500m time trial (LC3–4/CP 3)	Paula Tesoriero; New Zealand	Natalie Simanowski; Germany	Jayme Paris; Australia
Women's 1 km time trial (B&VI 1–3)	Great Britain (GBR); Aileen McGlynn; Ellen Hunter	Australia (AUS); Felicity Johnson; Katie Parker	Australia (AUS); Lindy Hou; Toireasa Gallagher
Women's Individual pursuit (B&VI 1–3)	Great Britain (GBR); Aileen McGlynn; Ellen Hunter	Australia (AUS); Lindy Hou; Toireasa Gallagher	United States (USA); Karissa Whitsell; Mackenzie Woodring
Women's Individual pursuit (LC 1–2/CP 4)	Sarah Storey; Great Britain	Jennifer Schuble; United States	Jingping Dong; China
Women's Individual pursuit (LC 3–4/CP 3)	Barbara Buchan; United States	Natalie Simanowski; Germany	Paula Tesoriero; New Zealand
Men's 1 km time trial (B&VI 1–3)	Great Britain (GBR); Anthony Kappes; Barney Storey	Australia (AUS); Ben Demery; Shaun Hopkins	Australia (AUS); Kieran Modra; Tyson Lawrence
Men's 1 km time trial (CP 3)	Darren Kenny; Great Britain	Rik Waddon; Great Britain	Tomas Kvasnicka; Czech Republic
Men's 1 km time trial (CP 4)	Masashi Ishii; Japan	Jiri Bouska; Czech Republic	Christopher Scott; Australia
Men's 1 km time trial (LC 1)	Mark Bristow; Great Britain	Kuidong Zhang; China	Wolfgang Sacher; Germany
Men's 1 km time trial (LC 2)	Jody Cundy; Great Britain	Jiří Ježek; Czech Republic	Yuanchao Zheng; China
Men's 1 km time trial (LC 3–4)	Simon Richardson; Great Britain	Masaki Fujita; Japan	Greg Ball; Australia
Men's Individual pursuit (B&VI 1–3)	Australia (AUS); Kieran Modra; Tyson Lawrence	Spain (ESP); Christian Venge; David Llaurado	Australia (AUS); Bryce Lindores; Steven George
Men's Individual pursuit (CP 3)	Darren Kenny; Great Britain	Yong-Sik Jin; South Korea	Jean Quevillon; Canada
Men's Individual pursuit (CP 4)	Christopher Scott; Australia	Masashi Ishii; Japan	Cesar Neira; Spain
Men's Individual pursuit (LC 1)	Michael Gallagher; Australia	Wolfgang Sacher; Germany	Fabio Triboli; Italy
Men's Individual pursuit (LC 2)	Jiří Ježek; Czech Republic	Roberto Alcaide; Spain	Jan Boyen; Belgium
Men's Individual pursuit (LC 3)	Simon Richardson; Great Britain	Masaki Fujita; Japan	Tobias Graf; Germany
Men's Individual pursuit (LC 4)	Paolo Viganò; Italy	Michael Teuber; Germany	Juan José Mendez; Spain
Men's Sprint (B&VI 1–3)	Great Britain (GBR); Anthony Kappes; Barney Storey	Australia (AUS); Ben Demery; Shaun Hopkins	South Africa (RSA); Gavin Kilpatrick; Michael Thomson
Men's Team sprint (LC1–4 CP3/4)	Great Britain (GBR); Darren Kenny; Mark Bristow; Jody Cundy	China (CHN); Kuidong Zhang; Yuanchao Zheng; Zhang Lu	Czech Republic (CZE); Tomas Kvasnicka; Jiri Bouska; Jiří Ježek

== Medal leaders ==
Athletes that won at least two gold medals or at least three total medals are listed below.
