= Tunisia at the Paralympics =

- IPC code: TUN
- NPC: Tunisian Paralympic Committee
- Medals: Gold 48 Silver 42 Bronze 25 Total 115

Summer appearances
- 1988; 1992; 1996; 2000; 2004; 2008; 2012; 2016; 2020; 2024

Tunisia made its Paralympic Games debut at the 1988 Summer Paralympics in Seoul. It was represented by a single athlete, Monaam Elabed, who won two bronze medals in athletics. The country has competed in every subsequent edition of the Summer Paralympics, although it has never taken part in the Winter Paralympics. Tunisian competitors had only ever taken part in athletics events until Dalila Tabai competed in powerlifting in 2000.

Tunisians have won a total of 23 gold medals, 22 silver and 9 bronze. The country's first gold medals came in 2000, when Wissam Ben Bahri took gold in the high jump, Ali Ghribi in the pentathlon, Fares Hamdi in the long jump, and Maher Bouallegue won three gold medals in running - in the 800 m, 1,500 m and 5,000 m races, in the T13 category for partially sighted athletes. In 2004, Bouallegue won three gold again - in the 1,500 m 5,000 m and 10,000 m events. The same year, Enna Ben Abidi took gold in the discus; Mohamed Charmi in the 1,500 m race in the T37 category; and Afrah Gomdi in both javelin and shot put. Tunisia also won gold in the men's 4x400 m race, in the T35-38 category. In 2008, Somaya Bousaid won the 800 m and 1,500 m races in the T13 category, while Farhat Chida took gold in both the 400 m race (T38) and in the long jump. Mourad Idoudi won the club throw and discus (F32/51); Faouzi Rzig the javelin (F33/34/52); Raoua Tlili the shot put (F40); and Abderrahim Zhiou the 800 m (T12).

Tunisia participated at the 1999 Arab Paralympics, held in Amman, Jordan. Tunisia won twelve gold medals, eight silver medals, and two bronze medals at the event. They finished fifth out of sixteen nations that competed at the games.

Tunisia took part in the 2012 Summer Paralympics, and the Tunisian Paralympic Committee chose Bedford as the UK training base for its Paralympians.

== Medals ==
=== Medals by Summer Games ===
Games	Athletes	Gold	Silver	Bronze	Total	Rank
1988 Seoul	1	0	0	2	2	47
1992 Barcelona	1	0	1	0	1	53
1996 Atlanta	3	0	2	0	2	54
2000 Sydney	10	6	4	1	11	27
2004 Athens	22	8	7	3	18	22
2008 Beijing	35	9	9	3	21	15
2012 London	31	9	5	5	19	14
2016 Rio	31	7	6	6	19	21
2020 Tokyo	25	4	5	2	11	28
2024 Paris	30	5	3	3	11	27
Total		48	42	25	114	33

=== Medals by Summer Sport ===
Games	Gold	Silver	Bronze	Total
Athletics	48	41	25	114
Total	48	41	25	114

=== Medalists ===
Medal	Name(s)	Games	Sport	Event
Bronze	Monaam Elabed	(South Korea) 1988 Seoul	Athletics	Men's 400m C6
Bronze	Monaam Elabed	(South Korea) 1988 Seoul	Athletics	Men's 3000m cross country C6
Silver	Wissem Ben Bahri	(United States) 1996 Atlanta	Athletics	Men's long jump MH
Silver	Abdel Jabbar Dhifallah	(United States) 1996 Atlanta	Athletics	Men's discus throw F36
Gold	Maher Bouallegue	(Australia) 2000 Sydney	Athletics	Men's 800m T13
Gold	Maher Bouallegue	(Australia) 2000 Sydney	Athletics	Men's 1500m T13
Gold	Maher Bouallegue	(Australia) 2000 Sydney	Athletics	Men's 5000m T13
Gold	Wissam Ben Bahri	(Australia) 2000 Sydney	Athletics	Men's high jump F20
Gold	Fares Hamdi	(Australia) 2000 Sydney	Athletics	Men's long jump F37
Gold	Ali Ghribi	(Australia) 2000 Sydney	Athletics	Men's pentathlon P58
Silver	Wissam Ben Bahri	(Australia) 2000 Sydney	Athletics	Men's long jump F20
Silver	Mohamed Ali Fatnassi	(Australia) 2000 Sydney	Athletics	Men's shot put F20
Silver	Khadija Jaballah	(Australia) 2000 Sydney	Athletics	Women's discus throw F58
Silver	Khadija Jaballah	(Australia) 2000 Sydney	Athletics	Women's shot put F58
Bronze	Tahar Lachheb	(Australia) 2000 Sydney	Athletics	Men's discus throw F58
Gold	Maher Bouallegue	(Greece) 2004 Athens	Athletics	Men's 1500m T13
Gold	Mohamed Charmi	(Greece) 2004 Athens	Athletics	Men's 1500m T37
Gold	Maher Bouallegue	(Greece) 2004 Athens	Athletics	Men's 5000m T12
Gold	Maher Bouallegue	(Greece) 2004 Athens	Athletics	Men's 10000m T13
Gold	Mohamed Charmi; Farhat Chida; Fares Hamdi; Abbes Saidi	(Greece) 2004 Athens	Athletics	Men's 4 × 400 m relay T35-38
Gold	Afrah Gomdi	(Greece) 2004 Athens	Athletics	Women's shot put F40
Gold	Enna Ben Abidi	(Greece) 2004 Athens	Athletics	Women's discus throw F40
Gold	Afrah Gomdi	(Greece) 2004 Athens	Athletics	Women's javelin throw F40
Silver	Farhat Chida	(Greece) 2004 Athens	Athletics	Men's 200m T38
Silver	Maher Bouallegue	(Greece) 2004 Athens	Athletics	Men's 800m T12
Silver	Mohamed Charmi	(Greece) 2004 Athens	Athletics	Men's 800m T37
Silver	Abbes Saidi	(Greece) 2004 Athens	Athletics	Men's 800m T38
Silver	Haissem Ben Halima	(Greece) 2004 Athens	Athletics	Men's discus throw F37
Silver	Afrah Gomdi	(Greece) 2004 Athens	Athletics	Women's discus throw F40
Silver	Enna Ben Abidi	(Greece) 2004 Athens	Athletics	Women's javelin throw F40
Bronze	Farhat Chida	(Greece) 2004 Athens	Athletics	Men's 100m T38
Bronze	Enna Ben Abidi	(Greece) 2004 Athens	Athletics	Women's shot put F40
Bronze	Fatma Kachroudi	(Greece) 2004 Athens	Athletics	Women's discus throw F37
Gold	Farhat Chida	(China) 2008 Beijing	Athletics	Men's 400m T38
Gold	Abderrahim Zhiou	(China) 2008 Beijing	Athletics	Men's 800m T12
Gold	Farhat Chida	(China) 2008 Beijing	Athletics	Men's long jump F37-38
Gold	Mourad Idoudi	(China) 2008 Beijing	Athletics	Men's club throw F32/51
Gold	Mourad Idoudi	(China) 2008 Beijing	Athletics	Men's discus throw F32/51
Gold	Faouzi Rzig	(China) 2008 Beijing	Athletics	Men's javelin throw F33-34/52
Gold	Somaya Bousaid	(China) 2008 Beijing	Athletics	Women's 800m T12-13
Gold	Somaya Bousaid	(China) 2008 Beijing	Athletics	Women's 1500m T13
Gold	Raoua Tlili	(China) 2008 Beijing	Athletics	Women's shot put F40
Silver	Abbes Saidi	(China) 2008 Beijing	Athletics	Men's 400m T38
Silver	Mohamed Fouzai	(China) 2008 Beijing	Athletics	Men's 5000m T46
Silver	Abderrahim Zhiou	(China) 2008 Beijing	Athletics	Men's 10000m T12
Silver	Mohamed Krid	(China) 2008 Beijing	Athletics	Men's javelin throw F33-34/52
Silver	Mourad Idoudi	(China) 2008 Beijing	Athletics	Men's shot put F32
Silver	Sonia Mansour	(China) 2008 Beijing	Athletics	Women's 100m T38
Silver	Sonia Mansour	(China) 2008 Beijing	Athletics	Women's 200m T38
Silver	Raoua Tlili	(China) 2008 Beijing	Athletics	Women's discus throw F40
Silver	Hania Aidi	(China) 2008 Beijing	Athletics	Women's javelin throw F54-56
Bronze	Mohamed Charmi; Farhat Chida; Fares Hamdi; Abbes Saidi	(China) 2008 Beijing	Athletics	Men's 4 × 100 m T35-38
Bronze	Mahmoud Khaldi	(China) 2008 Beijing	Athletics	Men's pentathlon P12
Bronze	Yousra Ben Jemaa	(China) 2008 Beijing	Athletics	Women's discus throw F32-34/51-53
Gold	Mahmoud Khaldi	(United Kingdom) 2012 London	Athletics	Men's 400m T12
Gold	Abderrahim Zhiou	(United Kingdom) 2012 London	Athletics	Men's 800m T12
Gold	Abderrahim Zhiou	(United Kingdom) 2012 London	Athletics	Men's 1500m T13
Gold	Walid Ktila	(United Kingdom) 2012 London	Athletics	Men's 100m T34
Gold	Walid Ktila	(United Kingdom) 2012 London	Athletics	Men's 200m T34
Gold	Mohamed Farhat Chida	(United Kingdom) 2012 London	Athletics	Men's 400m T38
Gold	Neda Bahi	(United Kingdom) 2012 London	Athletics	Women's 400m T37
Gold	Maroua Ibrahmi	(United Kingdom) 2012 London	Athletics	Women's club throw F31/32/51
Gold	Raoua Tlili	(United Kingdom) 2012 London	Athletics	Women's shot put F40
Silver	Abderrahim Zhiou	(United Kingdom) 2012 London	Athletics	Men's 5000m T12
Silver	Mohamed Charmi	(United Kingdom) 2012 London	Athletics	Men's 800m T37
Silver	Somaya Bousaid	(United Kingdom) 2012 London	Athletics	Women's 400m T13
Silver	Raoua Tlili	(United Kingdom) 2012 London	Athletics	Women's discus throw F40
Silver	Hania Aidi	(United Kingdom) 2012 London	Athletics	Women's javelin throw F54/55/56
Bronze	Abderrahim Zhiou	(United Kingdom) 2012 London	Athletics	Men's marathon T12
Bronze	Mohamed Charmi	(United Kingdom) 2012 London	Athletics	Men's 1500m T37
Bronze	Mohamed Zemzemi	(United Kingdom) 2012 London	Athletics	Men's discus throw F51/52/53
Bronze	Neda Bahi	(United Kingdom) 2012 London	Athletics	Women's 100m T37
Bronze	Maroua Ibrahmi	(United Kingdom) 2012 London	Athletics	Women's shot put F32/34
Gold	Raoua Tlili	(Brazil) 2016 Rio de Janeiro	Athletics	Women's shot put F41
Gold	Maroua Brahmi	(Brazil) 2016 Rio de Janeiro	Athletics	Women's club throw F31/32
Gold	Soumaya Bousaid	(Brazil) 2016 Rio de Janeiro	Athletics	Women's 1500 m T13
Gold	Abbes Saidi	(Brazil) 2016 Rio de Janeiro	Athletics	Men's 1500 m T38
Gold	Walid Ktila	(Brazil) 2016 Rio de Janeiro	Athletics	Men's 100 m T34
Gold	Raoua Tlili	(Brazil) 2016 Rio de Janeiro	Athletics	Women's discus throw F41
Gold	Maroua Brahmi	(Brazil) 2016 Rio de Janeiro	Athletics	Women's shot put F32
Silver	Samar Ben Koelleb	(Brazil) 2016 Rio de Janeiro	Athletics	Women's shot put F41
Silver	Hania Aidi	(Brazil) 2016 Rio de Janeiro	Athletics	Women's shot put F54
Silver	Najah Chouaya	(Brazil) 2016 Rio de Janeiro	Athletics	Woman's 1500 m T13
Silver	Rima Abdelli	(Brazil) 2016 Rio de Janeiro	Athletics	Woman's shot put F40
Silver	Hania Aidi	(Brazil) 2016 Rio de Janeiro	Athletics	Women's javelin throw F53/54
Silver	Walid Ktila	(Brazil) 2016 Rio de Janeiro	Athletics	Men's 800 metres T34
Bronze	Fadhila Nafati	(Brazil) 2016 Rio de Janeiro	Athletics	Woman's shot put F54
Bronze	Yassine Gharbi	(Brazil) 2016 Rio de Janeiro	Athletics	Men's 400 m T54
Bronze	Neda Bahi	(Brazil) 2016 Rio de Janeiro	Athletics	Women's 400 m T37
Bronze	Bilel Aloui	(Brazil) 2016 Rio de Janeiro	Athletics	Men's 5000 m T13
Bronze	Fathia Amaimia	(Brazil) 2016 Rio de Janeiro	Athletics	Women's discus throw F41
Bronze	Smaali Bouaabid	(Brazil) 2016 Rio de Janeiro	Athletics	Men's shot put F40
Gold	Raoua Tlili	(Japan) 2020 Tokyo	Athletics	Women's shot put F41
Gold	Walid Ktila	(Japan) 2020 Tokyo	Athletics	Men's 100 metres T34
Gold	Raoua Tlili	(Japan) 2020 Tokyo	Athletics	Women's discus throw F41
Gold	Walid Ktila	(Japan) 2020 Tokyo	Athletics	Men's 800 metres T34
Silver	Ahmed Ben Moslah	(Japan) 2020 Tokyo	Athletics	Men's shot put F37
Silver	Rouay Jebabli	(Japan) 2020 Tokyo	Athletics	Men's 1500 metres T13
Silver	Yassine Guenichi	(Japan) 2020 Tokyo	Athletics	Men's shot put F36
Silver	Mohamed Farhat Chida	(Japan) 2020 Tokyo	Athletics	Men's 400 metres T38
Silver	Rima Abdelli	(Japan) 2020 Tokyo	Athletics	Women's shot put F40
Bronze	Somaya Bousaid	(Japan) 2020 Tokyo	Athletics	Women's 1500 metres T13
Bronze	Rouay Jebabli	(Japan) 2020 Tokyo	Athletics	Men's 400 metres T12
Gold	Raoua Tlili	(France) 2024 Paris	Athletics	Women's shot put F41
Gold	Maroua Brahmi	(France) 2024 Paris	Athletics	Women's club throw F32
Gold	Raoua Tlili	(France) 2024 Paris	Athletics	Women's discus throw F41
Gold	Amen Allah Tissaoui	(France) 2024 Paris	Athletics	Men's 1500 m T38
Gold	Wajdi Boukhili	(France) 2024 Paris	Athletics	Men's Marathon T12
Silver	Rouay Jebabli	(France) 2024 Paris	Athletics	Men's 1500 m T13
Silver	Walid Ktila	(France) 2024 Paris	Athletics	Men's 100 m T34
Silver	Ahmed Ben Moslah	(France) 2024 Paris	Athletics	Men's shot put F37
Bronze	Raja Jebali	(France) 2024 Paris	Athletics	Women's shot put F40
Bronze	Rouay Jebabli	(France) 2024 Paris	Athletics	Men's 400 m T12
Bronze	Amen Allah Tissaoui	(France) 2024 Paris	Athletics	Men's 400 m T37

== See also ==
- Tunisia at the Olympics
