= Tunisia at the 2008 Summer Paralympics =

- IPC code: TUN
- NPC: Tunisian Paralympic Committee

in Beijing
- Competitors: 35 in 1 sport
- Flag bearer: Ahmed Benhaj Ali
- Medals Ranked 15th: Gold 9 Silver 9 Bronze 3 Total 21

Summer Paralympics appearances (overview)
- 1988; 1992; 1996; 2000; 2004; 2008; 2012; 2016; 2020; 2024

Tunisia sent a delegation to compete at the 2008 Summer Paralympics in Beijing. The country was represented by 35 athletes (22 men and 13 women).

== Medallists ==
Medal	Name	Sport	Event
Gold	Farhat Chida	Athletics	Men's 400m T38
Gold	Abderrahim Zhiou	Athletics	Men's 800m T12
Gold	Farhat Chida	Athletics	Men's long jump F37-38
Gold	Mourad Idoudi	Athletics	Men's club throw F32/51
Gold	Mourad Idoudi	Athletics	Men's discus throw F32/51
Gold	Faouzi Rzig	Athletics	Men's javelin throw F33-34/52
Gold	Somaya Bousaid	Athletics	Women's 800m T12-13
Gold	Somaya Bousaid	Athletics	Women's 1500m T13
Gold	Raoua Tlili	Athletics	Women's shot put F40
Silver	Abbes Saidi	Athletics	Men's 400m T38
Silver	Mohamed Fouzai	Athletics	Men's 5000m T46
Silver	Abderrahim Zhiou	Athletics	Men's 10000m T12
Silver	Mohamed Krid	Athletics	Men's javelin throw F33-34/52
Silver	Mourad Idoudi	Athletics	Men's shot put F32
Silver	Sonia Mansour	Athletics	Women's 100m T38
Silver	Sonia Mansour	Athletics	Women's 200m T38
Silver	Raoua Tlili	Athletics	Women's discus throw F40
Silver	Hania Aidi	Athletics	Women's javelin throw F54-56
Bronze	Mohamed Charmi; Farhat Chida; Fares Hamdi; Abbes Saidi	Athletics	Men's 4x100m relay T35-38
Bronze	Mahmoud Khaldi	Athletics	Men's pentathlon P12
Bronze	Yousra Ben Jemaa	Athletics	Women's discus throw F32-34/51-53

== Sports ==
=== Athletics ===
==== Men's track ====
Athlete	Class	Event	Heats		Semifinal		Final	
Athlete	Class	Event	Result	Rank	Result	Rank	Result	Rank
Ahmed Aouadi	T54	100m	14.61	8 q	—		14.72	8
Ahmed Aouadi	T54	200m	27.03	21	did not advance			
Ahmed Aouadi	T54	400m	50.24	16 q	52.84	13	did not advance	
Ahmed Belhaj Ali	T12	100m	11.48	11 Q	11.42	11	did not advance	
Samir Chaabani	T46	Marathon	—				2:35:54	6
Mohamed Charmi	T37	200m	25.30	6 q	—		53.24	8
Mohamed Charmi	T37	800m	—				2:03.91	4
Farhat Chida	T38	100m	—				11.39	5
Farhat Chida	T38	200m	23.69	6 Q	—		22.60	4
Farhat Chida	T38	400m	—				51.14	1st place, gold medalist(s)
Mohamed Fouzai	T46	800m	2:00.78	8 Q	—		1:53.75	4
Mohamed Fouzai	T46	1500m	4:09.95	8 Q	—		4:41.87	12
Mohamed Fouzai	T46	Marathon	—				DNF	
Ali Ganfoudi	T12	100m	11.60	12 Q	11.40	10	did not advance	
Ali Ganfoudi	T12	200m	23.75	18	did not advance			
Mahmoud Khaldi	T12	400m	50.12	3 q	DNF		did not advance	
Faycal Othmani	T37	800m	—				2:12.42	6
Abbes Saidi	T38	200m	25.50	13	did not advance			
Abbes Saidi	T38	400m	—				51.97	2nd place, silver medalist(s)
Fethi Saidi	T46	200m	23.59	16	did not advance			
Fethi Saidi	T46	400m	52.26	13	did not advance			
Abderrahim Zhiou	T12	800m	1:56.01	1 Q	—		1:52.13 WR	1st place, gold medalist(s)
Abderrahim Zhiou	T12	10000m	—				31:43.15	2nd place, silver medalist(s)
Abderrahim Zhiou	T12	Marathon	—				2:35:26	4
Omar Zidi	T52	400m	1:08.03	12	did not advance			
Omar Zidi	T52	Marathon	—				2:09:04	7
Fethi Zouinkhi	T54	Marathon	—				1:38:06	30
Mohamed Charmi; Farhat Chida; Fares Hamdi; Abbes Saidi	T35-38	4x100m relay	—				47.81	3rd place, bronze medalist(s)

==== Men's field ====
Athlete	Class	Event	Final		
Athlete	Class	Event	Result	Points	Rank
Mohamed Amara	F40	Shot put	9.23	-	11
Farhat Chida	F37-38	Long jump	6.44 WR	1104	1st place, gold medalist(s)
Abdeljabbar Dhifallah	F37-38	Javelin throw	39.10	812	9
Fares Hamdi	F37-38	Long jump	5.77 SB	1003	6
Mourad Idoudi	F32	Shot put	10.40	-	2nd place, silver medalist(s)
Mourad Idoudi	F32/51	Club throw	35.77 WR	1125	1st place, gold medalist(s)
Mourad Idoudi	F32/51	Discus throw	19.72 WR	1132	1st place, gold medalist(s)
Mahmoud Khaldi	P12	Pentathlon	3149		3rd place, bronze medalist(s)
Mohamed Krid	F33-34/52	Discus throw	38.09	969	4
Mohamed Krid	F33-34/52	Javelin throw	31.26	1172	2nd place, silver medalist(s)
Mohamed Krid	F33-34/52	Shot put	9.43	874	14
Faouzi Rzig	F33-34/52	Javelin throw	34.81 WR	1305	1st place, gold medalist(s)
Hamdi Warfili	F37-38	Discus throw	39.47	886	7
Hamdi Warfili	F37-38	Shot put	12.56 SB	842	8
Abderrahim Zhiou	P12	Pentathlon	3050		6

==== Women's track ====
Athlete	Class	Event	Heats		Final	
Athlete	Class	Event	Result	Rank	Result	Rank
Somaya Bousaid	T13	400m	56.86	2 Q	56.72	4
Somaya Bousaid	T13	800m	2:20.18	3 Q	2:03.21	1st place, gold medalist(s)
Somaya Bousaid	T13	1500m	—		4:14.00	1st place, gold medalist(s)
Sonia Mansour	T38	100m	13.65 PR	2 Q	13.66	2nd place, silver medalist(s)
Sonia Mansour	T38	200m	27.93 =WR	1 Q	28.07	2nd place, silver medalist(s)
Masouda Siffi	T54	100m	18.16	11	did not advance	
Masouda Siffi	T54	200m	33.01	13	did not advance	
Masouda Siffi	T54	Marathon	—		1:57:19	10

==== Women's field ====
Athlete	Class	Event	Final		
Athlete	Class	Event	Result	Points	Rank
Hania Aidi	F54-56	Javelin throw	16.83	1149	2nd place, silver medalist(s)
Hania Aidi	F54-56	Shot put	6.31	1016	4
Aroua Bidani	F32-34/51-53	Discus throw	5.96	537	19
Aroua Bidani	F32-34/51-53	Shot put	4.08	802	16
Yousra Ben Jemaa	F32-34/51-53	Discus throw	21.00	1098	3rd place, bronze medalist(s)
Yousra Ben Jemaa	F32-34/51-53	Shot put	6.52	864	14
Yousra Ben Jemaa	F33-34/52-53	Javelin throw	14.51	1022	5
Najet Ghribi	F35-38	Javelin throw	20.62	868	12
Amani Guizani	F35-38	Javelin throw	18.04 SB	1040	7
Fatma Kachroudi	F37-38	Discus throw	26.39	898	9
Fatma Kachroudi	F37-38	Shot put	8.70	849	15
Aida Sidhom	F35-38	Javelin throw	26.25	1105	4
Mariem Soudani	F57-58	Discus throw	30.78	979	6
Raoua Tlili	F40	Discus throw	27.61 SB	-	2nd place, silver medalist(s)
Raoua Tlili	F40	Shot put	8.95 WR	-	1st place, gold medalist(s)

== See also ==
- 2008 Summer Paralympics
- Tunisia at the Paralympics
- Tunisia at the 2008 Summer Olympics
