= Athletics at the 2008 Summer Paralympics – Men's 200 metres T38 =

The Men's 200m T38 had its First Round held on September 13 at 9:30 and the Final on September 14 at 18:03.

== Medalists ==
Gold	Evan O'Hanlon; Australia
Silver	Wenjun Zhou; China
Bronze	Mykyta Senyk; Ukraine

== Results ==
Place	Athlete	Round 1	Final
1	Evan O'Hanlon (AUS)	22.98 Q	21.98 WR
2	Wenjun Zhou (CHN)	23.10 Q	22.38
3	Mykyta Senyk (UKR)	22.99 Q	22.52
4	Farhat Chida (TUN)	23.69 Q	22.60
5	Chen Yang (CHN)	23.19 Q	22.99
6	Edson Pinheiro (BRA)	23.62 q	23.46
7	Timothy Sullivan (AUS)	23.74 Q	23.62
8	Marius Stander (RSA)	24.35 q	24.23
9	Haider Ali (PAK)	24.84	
10	Stephen Payton (GBR)	24.89	
11	Andriy Onufriyenko (UKR)	24.94	
12	Aristotelis Marinos (GRE)	25.14	
13	Abbes Saidi (TUN)	25.50	
14	Christopher Mullins (AUS)	25.51	
