= Athletics at the 2008 Summer Paralympics – Men's 800 metres T37 =

The Men's 800m T37 had its Final held on September 10 at 19:56.

== Medalists ==
Gold	Michael McKillop; Ireland
Silver	Brad Scott; Australia
Bronze	Djamel Mastouri; France

== Results ==
Place	Athlete	Final
1	Michael McKillop (IRL)	1:59.39 WR
2	Brad Scott (AUS)	2:02.71
3	Djamel Mastouri (FRA)	2:03.04
4	Mohamed Charmi (TUN)	2:03.91
5	Jianming Lu (CHN)	2:10.26
6	Faycal Othmani (TUN)	2:12.42
7	Mariusz Tubielewicz (POL)	2:15.45
8	Khaled Hanani (ALG)	2:16.03
