= Athletics at the 2008 Summer Paralympics – Men's 400 metres T38 =

The Men's 400m T38 had its Final held on September 10 at 18:20.

== Medalists ==
Gold	Farhat Chida; Tunisia
Silver	Abbes Saidi; Tunisia
Bronze	Andriy Onufriyenko; Ukraine

== Results ==
Place	Athlete	Final
1	Farhat Chida (TUN)	51.14
2	Abbes Saidi (TUN)	51.97
3	Andriy Onufriyenko (UKR)	52.45
4	Marius Stander (RSA)	52.56
5	Stephen Payton (GBR)	54.02
6	Christopher Mullins (AUS)	54.59
7	Wenjun Zhou (CHN)	1:27.97
	Edson Pinheiro (BRA)	DNF
	Timothy Sullivan (AUS)	DSQ
