= Athletics at the 2008 Summer Paralympics – Women's discus throw F35–36 =

The Women's Discus Throw F35-36 had its Final held on September 9 at 9:35.

== Medalists ==
Gold	Wu Qing; China
Silver	Kath Proudfoot; Australia
Bronze	Alla Malchyk; Ukraine

== Results ==
Place	Athlete	Class	1	2	3	4	5	6	Best	Points
1	Wu Qing (CHN)	F36	23.29	24.27	24.11	24.61	25.14	25.80	25.80 WR	1199
2	Kath Proudfoot (AUS)	F36	20.01	20.46	18.67	19.78	23.91	20.82	23.91	1111
3	Alla Malchyk (UKR)	F36	19.17	21.88	20.09	x	21.06	22.15	22.15	1029
4	Renata Chilewska (POL)	F35	23.15	23.81	23.51	22.35	23.69	22.07	23.81 PR	991
5	Bai Xuhong (CHN)	F35	20.56	21.27	21.80	22.32	22.68	23.42	23.42	975
6	Chenelle van Zyl (RSA)	F35	20.57	21.90	22.16	19.91	20.42	x	22.16	923
7	Kris Vriend (CAN)	F36	16.39	16.12	17.46	16.26	x	16.44	17.46	811
8	Perla Munoz (ARG)	F35	17.47	17.11	17.74	15.57	14.14	x	17.74	739
9	Mariko Fujita (JPN)	F36	15.51	15.49	14.58				15.51	721
10	Noni Thompson (AUS)	F36	15.21	x	14.84				15.21	707
11	Rosenei Herrera (BRA)	F36	13.28	13.42	12.78				13.42	623
