= Athletics at the 2008 Summer Paralympics – Women's 200 metres T38 =

The Women's 200m T38 had its competition held on September 12 with the First Round at 10:23 and the Final at 18:00.

== Medalists ==
Gold	Inna Dyachenko; Ukraine
Silver	Sonia Mansour; Tunisia
Bronze	Margarita Koptilova; Russia

== Results ==
Place	Athlete	First Round	Final
1	Inna Dyachenko (UKR)	27.93 Q WR	27.81 WR
2	Sonia Mansour (TUN)	27.93 Q =WR	28.07
3	Margarita Koptilova (RUS)	28.75 Q	28.62
4	Tamira Slaby (GER)	28.71 Q PR	30.02
5	Katy Parrish (AUS)	30.46 Q	30.46
6	Anezka Vejrazkova (CZE)	30.57 Q	30.61
7	Katsiaryna Kirushchanka (BLR)	30.79 q	31.00
8	Maria Fernandes (POR)	31.21 q	31.38
9	Jenifer Santos (BRA)	31.22	
10	Kirrilee McPherson (AUS)	31.97	
11	Aikaterini Michou (GRE)	34.62	
