= Athletics at the 2004 Summer Paralympics – Men's 800 metres T37–38 =

Men's 800m races for athletes with cerebral palsy at the 2004 Summer Paralympics were held in the Athens Olympic Stadium from 23 to 24 September. Events were held in two disability classes.

== T37 ==
Men's 800m T37 at the XII Paralympic Games
- Venue: Athens Olympic Stadium
- Dates: 23–24 September 2004
- Competitors: 16 from 13 nations
- Winning time: 2:03.18

Medalists
1st place, gold medalist(s)		Oleksandr Driha	Ukraine
2nd place, silver medalist(s)		Mohamed Charmi	Tunisia
3rd place, bronze medalist(s)		Mariusz Tubielewicz	Poland

The T37 event consisted of 2 heats and a final. It was won by Oleksandr Driha, representing Ukraine.

=== 1st Round ===
Qualified for next round

Heat 1

23 Sept. 2004, 20:50

Rank	Athlete	Time	Notes
1	Oleksandr Driha (UKR)	2:14.12	Q
2	Mariusz Tubielewicz (POL)	2:16.10	Q
3	Stephen Cooper (GBR)	2:16.11	Q
4	Mustapha Thabet (ALG)	2:16.12	q
5	Carlos Fernandez (ESP)	2:24.90	
6	Choi Yong Jin (KOR)	2:35.54	
	Malcolm Bennett (AUS)	DNS	
	Gaston Torres (ARG)	DNS	

Heat 2

23 Sept. 2004, 20:57

Rank	Athlete	Time	Notes
1	Mohamed Charmi (TUN)	2:08.85	WR Q
2	Rezki Reguig (ALG)	2:14.64	Q
3	Micha Janse (NED)	2:15.13	Q
4	Kang Sung Kook (KOR)	2:22.57	q
5	Lamouri Rahmouni (FRA)	2:23.00	
6	He Cheng En (CHN)	2:26.17	
	Benny Govaerts (BEL)	DNF	
	Khaled Hanani (ALG)	DSQ	

=== Final Round ===
24 Sept. 2004, 19:40

Rank	Athlete	Time	Notes
1st place, gold medalist(s)	Oleksandr Driha (UKR)	2:03.18	WR
2nd place, silver medalist(s)	Mohamed Charmi (TUN)	2:05.10	
3rd place, bronze medalist(s)	Mariusz Tubielewicz (POL)	2:10.17	
4	Stephen Cooper (GBR)	2:12.62	
5	Micha Janse (NED)	2:13.41	
6	Rezki Reguig (ALG)	2:13.87	
7	Mustapha Thabet (ALG)	2:14.62	
8	Kang Sung Kook (KOR)	2:21.31	

== T38 ==
Men's 800m T38 at the XII Paralympic Games
- Venue: Athens Olympic Stadium
- Dates: 20 September 2004
- Competitors: 8 from 7 nations
- Winning time: 1:58.87

Medalists
1st place, gold medalist(s)		Malcolm Pringle	South Africa
2nd place, silver medalist(s)		Abbes Saidi	Tunisia
3rd place, bronze medalist(s)		Derek Malone	Ireland

The T38 event consisted of a single race. It was won by Malcolm Pringle, representing South Africa.

=== Final Round ===
20 Sept. 2004, 21:35

Rank	Athlete	Time	Notes
1st place, gold medalist(s)	Malcolm Pringle (RSA)	1:58.87	WR
2nd place, silver medalist(s)	Abbes Saidi (TUN)	1:59.85	
3rd place, bronze medalist(s)	Derek Malone (IRL)	2:01.76	
4	Valeriy Stepanskoy (RUS)	2:04.43	
5	Iván Hompanera (ESP)	2:13.30	
6	Aleš Švehlík (CZE)	2:16.53	
7	Steven Leigh (GBR)	2:18.75	
8	Jose Manuel Gonzalez (ESP)	2:21.14	
