= Athletics at the 2008 Summer Paralympics – Men's 4 × 100 metre relay T35–T38 =

Men's 4x100m T35-38 at the XIII Paralympic Games
- Venue: Beijing National Stadium
- Dates: 16 September
- Competitors: 5
- Winning time: 44.81

Medalists
1st place, gold medalist(s)		Australia (AUS); Evan O'Hanlon, Darren Thrupp, Christopher Mullins, Tim Sullivan
2nd place, silver medalist(s)		China (CHN); Che Mian, Zhou Wenjun, Yang Chen, Ma Yuxi
3rd place, bronze medalist(s)		Tunisia (TUN); Fares Hamdi, Abbes Saidi, Mohamed Charmi, Farhat Chida

The men's 4 × 100 m T35-38 event at the 2008 Summer Paralympics took place at the Beijing National Stadium on 16 September. There were no heats in this event. The winners were the team representing Australia.

== Results ==
=== Final ===
Competed at 19:36.

Rank	Nation	Swimmers	Time	Notes
1st place, gold medalist(s)	Australia	Evan O'Hanlon; Darren Thrupp; Christopher Mullins; Tim Sullivan	44.81	WR
2nd place, silver medalist(s)	China	Che Mian; Zhou Wenjun; Yang Chen; Ma Yuxi	45.00	
3rd place, bronze medalist(s)	Tunisia	Fares Hamdi; Abbes Saidi; Mohamed Charmi; Farhat Chida	47.81	
	Ukraine	Andriy Onufriyenko; Sergii Kravchenko; Roman Pavlyk; Mykyta Senyk	DNF	
	Algeria	Mohamed Allek; Mvstapha Moussaoui; Allel Boukhalfa; Sofiane Hamdi	DQ	

WR = World Record. DNF = Did not finish. DQ = Disqualified (passing of the baton outside the take-over zone).
