= Athletics at the 2008 Summer Paralympics – Women's shot put F35–36 =

Women's Shot Put F35/36 at the XIII Paralympic Games
- Venue: Beijing National Stadium
- Dates: 12 September
- Competitors: 11 from 9 nations
- Winning distance: 9.33

Medalists
1st place, gold medalist(s)		Alla Malchyk	Ukraine
2nd place, silver medalist(s)		Wu Qing	China
3rd place, bronze medalist(s)		Renata Chilewska	Poland

The women's shot put F35/36 event at the 2008 Summer Paralympics took place at the Beijing National Stadium at 09:15 on 12 September. There was a single round of competition; after the first three throws, only the top eight had 3 further throws. The competition was won by Alla Malchyk, representing Ukraine.

== Results ==
Rank	Athlete	Nationality	Cl.	1	2	3	4	5	6	Best	Pts.	Notes
1st place, gold medalist(s)	Alla Malchyk	Ukraine	F36	8.42	8.63	8.95	9.33	9.33	x	9.33	1048	WR
2nd place, silver medalist(s)	Wu Qing	China	F36	8.94	9.08	8.68	8.69	8.72	9.13	9.13	1025	
3rd place, bronze medalist(s)	Renata Chilewska	Poland	F35	8.73	8.86	9.13	9.04	8.72	9.26	9.26	992	SB
4	Kath Proudfoot	Australia	F36	7.83	8.18	x	8.35	7.61	x	8.35	938	
5	Chenelle van Zyl	South Africa	F35	7.28	6.88	7.42	7.26	7.13	7.08	7.42	795	
6	Kris Vriend	Canada	F36	x	6.95	6.17	6.03	7.05	6.55	7.05	792	
7	Rosenei Herrera	Brazil	F36	6.73	6.68	6.50	6.68	6.94	6.26	6.94	780	
8	Perla Munoz	Argentina	F35	6.87	7.13	7.07	7.13	7.09	7.04	7.13	764	SB
9	Mariko Fujita	Japan	F36	6.36	6.62	6.49	-	-	-	6.62	744	
10	Bai Xuhong	China	F35	6.61	6.45	5.97	-	-	-	6.61	708	
11	Noni Thompson	Australia	F36	6.07	5.89	5.74	-	-	-	6.07	682	

WR = World Record. SB = Seasonal Best.
