= Monaam Elabed =

Tunisian Paralympic athlete

Medal record

Track and field (C6)

Representing Tunisia

Paralympic Games
Bronze medal – third place	1988 Seoul	3000 m cross country C6
Bronze medal – third place	1988 Seoul	400 m C6

Monaam Elabed is a Tunisian Paralympian track and field athlete.

He was the first Tunisian to participate in a Paralympic Games, when in 1988, he won two bronze medals in 400m C6 and 3000m cross country C6 event. He also competed in the 100 and 200m events.

== See also ==
- Tunisia at the Paralympics
- Athletics at the 1988 Summer Paralympics
