= Athletics at the 2008 Summer Paralympics – Men's 100 metres T38 =

The Men's 100m T38 had its Final held on September 12.

== Medalists ==
Gold	Evan O'Hanlon; Australia
Silver	Wenjun Zhou; China
Bronze	Mykyta Senyk; Ukraine

== Results ==
Place	Athlete	Final
1	Evan O'Hanlon (AUS)	10.96 WR
2	Wenjun Zhou (CHN)	11.14
3	Mykyta Senyk (UKR)	11.18
4	Edson Pinheiro (BRA)	11.30
5	Farhat Chida (TUN)	11.39
6	Andriy Onufriyenko (UKR)	11.70
7	Timothy Sullivan (AUS)	11.91
8	Aristotelis Marinos (GRE)	11.93
9	Haider Ali (PAK)	11.98
