= Athletics at the 2008 Summer Paralympics – Men's discus throw F32/51 =

The Men's Discus Throw F32/51 had its Final held on September 11 at 17:00.

== Medalists ==
Gold	Mourad Idoudi; Tunisia
Silver	Joze Flere; Slovenia
Bronze	Martin Zvolanek; Czech Republic

== Results ==
Place	Athlete	Class	1	2	3	4	5	6	Best	Points
1	Mourad Idoudi (TUN)	F32	18.90	19.06	19.72	16.70	18.54	19.08	19.72 WR	1132
2	Joze Flere (SLO)	F51	x	9.53	10.99	10.93	x	10.62	10.99 WR	1119
3	Martin Zvolanek (CZE)	F51	9.07	10.27	10.78	9.92	x	9.71	10.78	1098
4	Karim Betina (ALG)	F32	x	17.84	19.04	x	18.83	x	19.04	1093
5	Radim Beles (CZE)	F51	9.67	8.94	9.57	x	9.14	9.92	9.92	1010
6	Pantelis Kalogeros (GRE)	F51	9.78	8.78	9.55	x	9.77	x	9.78	996
7	Frantisek Serbus (CZE)	F32	17.05	16.74	16.28	x	17.01	16.52	17.05	979
8	Richard Schabel (GBR)	F51	9.25	8.88	9.55	x	8.60	x	9.55	973
9	John McCarthy (IRL)	F51	9.30	9.48	9.06				9.48	966
10	Miroslav Matic (CRO)	F51	9.32	9.04	9.43				9.43	960
11	David Gale (GBR)	F51	8.24	x	8.88				8.88	904
12	Stephen Miller (GBR)	F32	14.06	15.44	13.05				15.44	887
	Mounir Bakiri (ALG)	F32	x	x	x				NM	0
