= Athletics at the 2008 Summer Paralympics – Women's javelin throw F35–38 =

Women's Javelin F35-38 at the XIII Paralympic Games
- Venue: Beijing National Stadium
- Dates: 10 September
- Competitors: 19 from 14 nations
- Winning distance: 28.84

Medalists
| 1st place, gold medalist(s) | | Wu Qing | China |
| 2nd place, silver medalist(s) | | Shirlene Coelho | Brazil |
| 3rd place, bronze medalist(s) | | Renata Chilewska | Poland |

The women's javelin F35-38 event at the 2008 Summer Paralympics took place at the Beijing National Stadium at 19:20 on 10 September. There was a single round of competition; after the first three throws, only the top eight had 3 further throws. The competition was won by Wu Qing, representing China.

== Results ==
| Rank | Athlete | Nationality | Cl. | 1 | 2 | 3 | 4 | 5 | 6 | Best | Pts. | Notes |
|---|---|---|---|---|---|---|---|---|---|---|---|---|
| 1st place, gold medalist(s) | Wu Qing | China | F36 | 21.72 | 28.59 | 27.99 | 25.80 | 28.82 | 28.84 | 28.84 | 1662 | WR |
| 2nd place, silver medalist(s) | Shirlene Coelho | Brazil | F37 | 33.11 | 31.05 | 32.78 | 31.37 | 35.95 | 34.69 | 35.95 | 1513 | WR |
| 3rd place, bronze medalist(s) | Renata Chilewska | Poland | F35 | 22.24 | 24.66 | 24.41 | 25.59 | 24.19 | 24.48 | 25.59 | 1161 | WR |
| 4 | Aida Sidhom | Tunisia | F37 | 25.29 | 25.20 | 25.84 | 26.25 | 25.27 | 25.92 | 26.25 | 1105 | |
| 5 | Yulia Arefyeva | Russia | F36 | 17.10 | 18.83 | 17.81 | 14.38 | 15.47 | 16.11 | 18.83 | 1085 | SB |
| 6 | Jia Qianqian | China | F37 | x | 23.96 | x | 24.01 | x | 25.02 | 25.02 | 1053 | |
| 7 | Amani Guizani | Tunisia | F36 | 14.62 | x | 18.04 | x | x | x | 18.04 | 1040 | SB |
| 8 | Svetlana Sergeeva | Russia | F37 | 23.03 | 23.77 | 24.60 | 23.67 | x | 24.04 | 24.60 | 1036 | SB |
| 9 | Lisa Callaghan | Ireland | F37 | x | 22.87 | x | - | - | - | 22.87 | 963 | |
| 10 | Charlotte Saville | Australia | F37 | 22.78 | x | 22.72 | - | - | - | 22.78 | 959 | |
| 11 | Viktoriya Yasevych | Ukraine | F37 | 20.68 | 19.53 | 22.55 | - | - | - | 22.55 | 949 | |
| 12 | Najet Ghribi | Tunisia | F37 | x | 20.62 | x | - | - | - | 20.62 | 868 | |
| 13 | Rosenei Herrera | Brazil | F36 | 14.59 | x | x | - | - | - | 14.59 | 841 | SB |
| 14 | Chenelle van Zyl | South Africa | F35 | 17.86 | x | 15.26 | - | - | - | 17.86 | 810 | SB |
| 15 | Liene Gruzite | Latvia | F37 | 18.63 | 19.17 | 18.97 | - | - | - | 19.17 | 807 | |
| 16 | Perla Munoz | Argentina | F35 | 17.40 | 17.74 | 17.23 | - | - | - | 17.74 | 805 | SB |
| 17 | Julie Crisp | United States | F37 | 18.63 | 18.84 | x | - | - | - | 18.84 | 793 | SB |
| 18 | Andrea Farkasova | Czech Republic | F38 | x | 18.29 | x | - | - | - | 18.29 | 676 | |
| | Ramune Adomaitiene | Lithuania | F38 | x | x | x | - | - | - | | NM | |

WR = World Record. SB = Seasonal Best.
