= Mariusz Tubielewicz =

Polish Paralympic athlete

Medal record

Paralympic athletics

Representing Poland

Paralympic Games
Bronze medal – third place	2004 Athens	800 metres - T37

Mariusz Tubielewicz (born 1978) is a paralympic athlete from Poland competing mainly in category T37 middle-distance events.

Mariusz competed in the 2000 Summer Paralympics in the 800m, 1500m and 5000m but it wasn't until the 2004 Summer Paralympics that he tasted medal success after winning bronze in the 800m and competing in the 1500m. He also competed in the 2008 Summer Paralympics in the 800m but could not match the bronze medal he won 2004 finishing in seventh place.
