= Ian Jones (athlete) =

British Paralympic athlete

Medal record

Track and field (T44)

Representing United Kingdom

Paralympic Games
Bronze medal – third place	2008 Beijing	200m - T44
Bronze medal – third place	2008 Beijing	400m - T44

Ian Jones is a Paralympian athlete from Great Britain competing mainly in category T44 sprint events.

Ian started his athletics career running 100m & 200m but made a successful step-up to 400m in 2007. He ran then personal bests for 100m (11.88) and 200m (23.82) for two silvers behind Oscar Pistorius at the 2007 Paralympic World Cup. Ian is a qualified football and disability sports coach and coaches in the Manchester and Stockport area. When he was younger, he had football trials with Manchester United and Stockport County and is a judo black belt.

He competed in the 2008 Summer Paralympics in Beijing, China where he won a bronze medal in the men's 200 metres - T44 event and a bronze medal in the men's 400 metres - T44 event.
