= Chris Martin (athlete) =

British Paralympic athlete

Medal record

Representing the United Kingdom

Men's Athletics

Paralympic Games
Gold medal – first place	2000 Sydney	Discus throw F33
Silver medal – second place	2000 Sydney	Javelin throw F33
Silver medal – second place	2008 Beijing	Discus throw F33-34/52

IPC Athletics World Championships
Gold medal – first place	1998 Birmingham	Discus throw F33
Gold medal – first place	1998 Birmingham	Javelin throw F33
Gold medal – first place	2002 Lille	Discus throw F33

Chris Martin (born 1 November 1971) is a British Paralympian track and field athlete competing in category F33 throwing events. He has represented Great Britain in four Paralympic Games. Martin has won two gold and one silver Paralympic medals in Discus and Javelin and won three gold medals in the IPC World Championship. He was the World record holder from 1995 to 2005, IPC World Championship record holder from 1998 to 2011, Paralympics record holder from 1996 to 2008 all for F33 Discus.

== Biography ==
Martin who has Cerebral palsy was born in Nottingham, England in 1971. He started his athletic training for throws at the age of 18. He took part in 1989 the World Junior Disabled Championships in USA and won a bronze for Discus and shot.

1994 IPC World Championship Berlin Javelin (F35) 7th
1996 Paralympics Atlanta Discus (F33/34) 7th / Shot (F33/34) 8th
1998 IPC World Championship Birmingham Discus (F33) Gold, Javelin (F33) Gold
2000 Paralympics Sydney Discus (F33) Gold, Javelin (F33) Silver
2002 IPC World Championship Lille Discus (F33/34) Gold
2004 Paralympics Athens Discus (F33/34) 4th
2008 Paralympics Beijing Discus (F33-34/F52) Silver
2011 IPC World Championship New Zealand Discus (F32/33/34) 14th

World record holder from 1995 to 2005 for F33 Discus
Paralympics record holder from 1996 to 2008 for F33 Discus
IPC World Championship record holder from 1998 to 2011 for F33 Discus

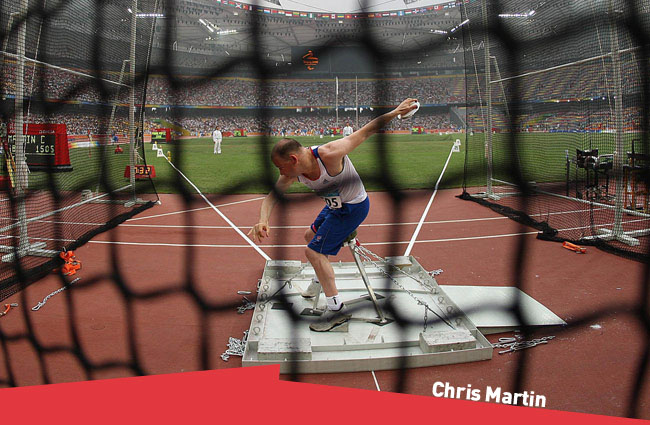
Chris Martin - Throwing Discus
