= Ma Yuxi =

Chinese Paralympic sprinter (born 1979)

Personal information
- Born: 21 March 1979 (age 47)

Sport
- Sport: Paralympic athletics
- Disability class: T37
Medal record
Track and field
Representing China
Paralympic Games
| Silver medal – second place | 2008 Beijing | 100m – T37 |
| Silver medal – second place | 2008 Beijing | 4 × 100 m – T35–38 |
| Bronze medal – third place | 2008 Beijing | 200m – T37 |
| Bronze medal – third place | 2008 Beijing | Long jump – F37/38 |
Asian Para Games
| Gold medal – first place | 2010 Guangzhou | 100m T37 |
| Gold medal – first place | 2010 Guangzhou | 200m T37 |
| Gold medal – first place | 2010 Guangzhou | 4 × 100 m relay T35–38 |
| Silver medal – second place | 2010 Guangzhou | Long jump F37–38 |

Ma Yuxi (Chinese: 马玉喜; pinyin: Mǎ Yùxǐ; born March 21, 1979) is a Paralympic athlete from China competing mainly in category T37 sprint events.

He competed in the 2008 Summer Paralympics in Beijing, China. There he won a silver medal in the men's 100 metres – T37 event, a silver medal in the men's 4 × 100 metre relay – T35–38 event, a bronze medal in the men's 200 metres – T37 event and a bronze medal in the men's Long jump – F37/38 event
