= Wu Qing (athlete) =

Chinese Paralympic athlete (born 1988)

Personal information
- Born: 25 March 1988 (age 38)

Sport
- Sport: Paralympic athletics
- Disability class: F36
Medal record
Paralympic athletics
Representing China
Paralympic Games
Gold medal – first place	2008 Beijing	Javelin throw F35–38
Gold medal – first place	2008 Beijing	Discus throw F35/36
Gold medal – first place	2012 London	Discus throw F35/36
Gold medal – first place	2024 Paris	Shot put F33
Silver medal – second place	2008 Beijing	Shot put F35/36
Silver medal – second place	2016 Rio de Janeiro	Shot put F36
Bronze medal – third place	2012 London	Shot put F35/36
World Championships
Gold medal – first place	2015 Doha	Shot put F36
Silver medal – second place	2011 Christchurch	Shot put F35/36
Silver medal – second place	2013 Lyon	Shot put F35/36
Silver medal – second place	2013 Lyon	Discus F35/36
Silver medal – second place	2024 Kobe	Shot put F33
Silver medal – second place	2025 New Delhi	Shot put F33
Asian Para Games
Gold medal – first place	2010 Guangzhou	Shot put F35-36
Silver medal – second place	2010 Guangzhou	Discus throw F35-36

Wu Qing (Chinese: 吴晴; pinyin: Wú Qíng; born March 25, 1988) is a Paralympic athlete from China competing in throwing events in the F36 cerebral palsy classification. Wu holds F36 World Records for discus and javelin.

== Career ==
Wu began competing in athletics in 2005. and made her international debut at the 2008 Summer Paralympics in Beijing, China. There she won gold medals in both the women's F35–38 javelin throw and the F35–36 discus throw event. She also finished second in the women's shot put – F35–36.

At the 2012 Summer Paralympics in London, Wu competed in F35-F36 shot put and discus events. In the shot put event, she broke the World Record for her F36 classification; she was awarded bronze behind F35 competitors Mariia Pomazan and Wang Jun who broke the World Record for their own classification. In the discus throw, Wu set a new F36 world record to win the event. A scoring error saw Mariia Pomazan initially presented with the gold medal, then being told to return it.

Outside of sport, Wu's hobbies include embroidery and listening to music.
