= Kath Proudfoot =

Australian Paralympic athlete

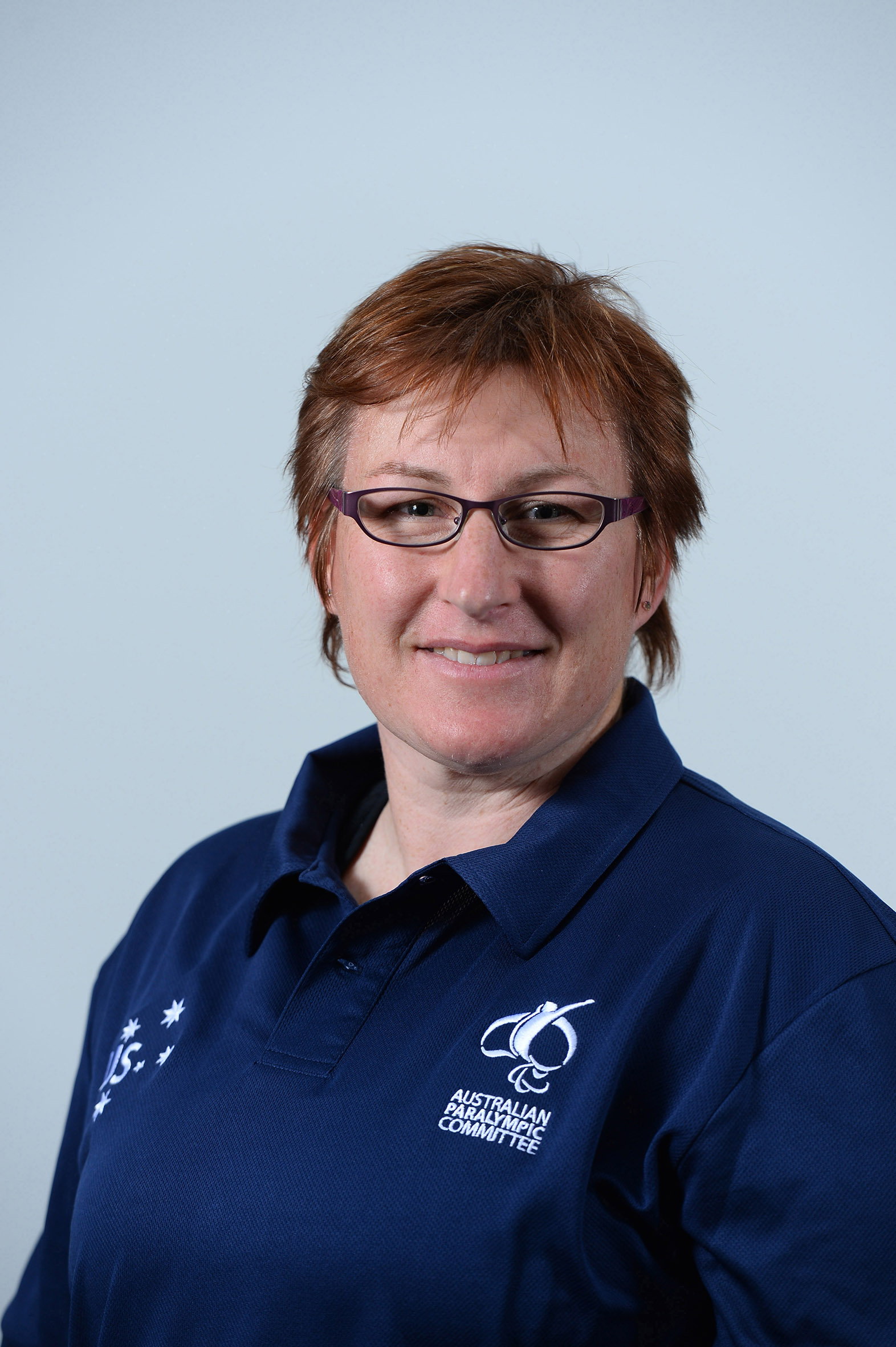
- 2016 Australian Paralympic team portrait of Proudfoot

Personal information
- Full name: Katherine Proudfoot
- Born: 21 April 1977 (age 49) Auckland, New Zealand
Medal record
Women's athletics
Representing Australia
Paralympic Games
Silver medal – second place	2008 Beijing	Discus throw – F35–36
Bronze medal – third place	2012 London	Discus throw – F35–36
Bronze medal – third place	2016 Rio	Shot put F36
IPC Athletics World Championships
Silver medal – second place	2006 Assen	Shot put F35–36
Bronze medal – third place	2006 Assen	100m T36
Bronze medal – third place	2006 Assen	Discus F35–36/38
Bronze medal – third place	2011 Christchurch	Discus F35–36
Bronze medal – third place	2013 Lyon	Shot put F35–36
Bronze medal – third place	2013 Lyon	Discus F35–36

Katherine Proudfoot (born 21 April 1977 in Auckland, New Zealand) is a cerebral palsy athlete from Australia competing mainly in throwing events. She competed in the F36 classification at the 2008, 2012 and the 2016 Summer Paralympics, winning medals at each Game. Following a medical review request in early 2017, she now competes in seated throws in the F32 classification. At the 2017 Australian Athletics Championships she threw 7.04m in the Women's Shot Put Secured event, bettering the Women's F32 shot put world record mark of 6.55m.

== Personal ==
She studied speech pathology at the University of Newcastle and now works in Canberra, Australian Capital Territory as a speech pathologist. She was identified through the Australian Paralympic Committee's Talent Search Program when it visited Newcastle, New South Wales and is now based in Canberra where Aaron Holt coaches her.

== Career ==
Paralympics

At the 2008 Summer Paralympics in Beijing, China, she won a silver medal in the Women's F35–36 discus throw event as well as competing in the Women's F35/36 shot put. At the 2012 Summer Paralympics Proudfoot participated in the Women's Shot Put F35/F36 and Discus F35/36, winning a bronze medal in the Discus. At the 2016 Rio Paralympics, she won the bronze medal in the Women's Shot Put F36 with a throw of 9.70 m.

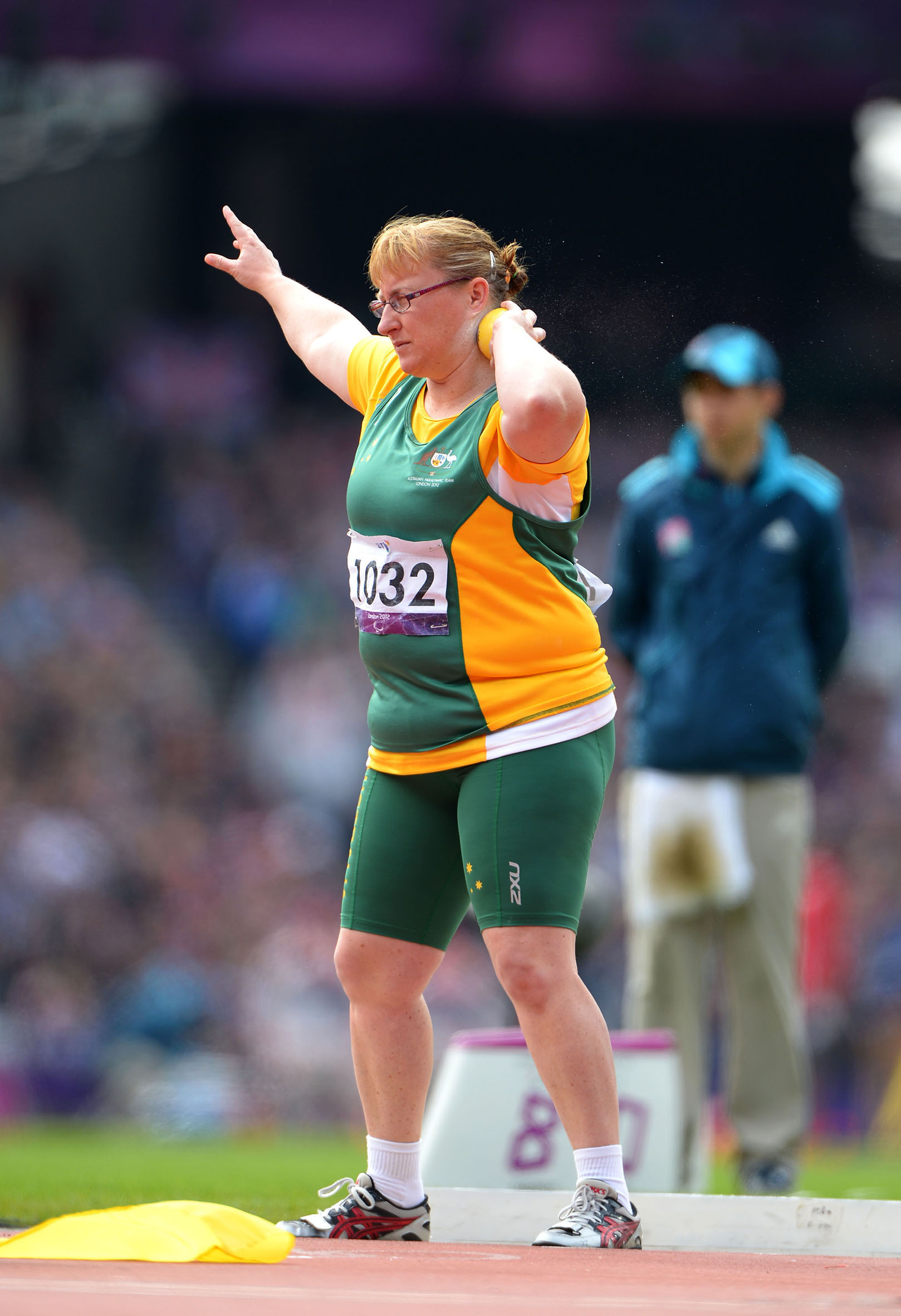
Proudfoot at the 2012 London Paralympics

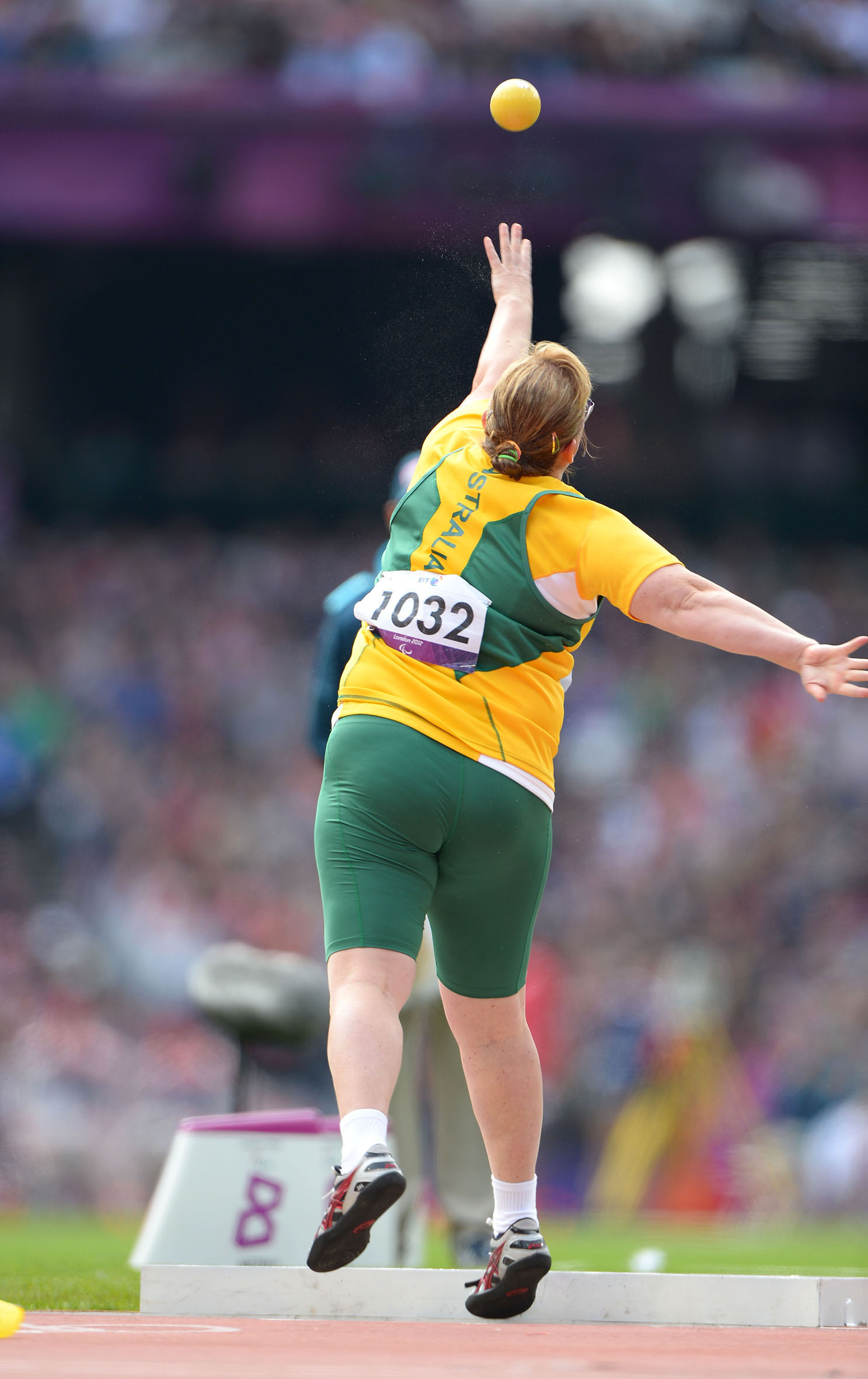
Proudfoot at the 2012 London Paralympics

IPC Athletics World Championships

She competed at the 2006 IPC Athletics World Championships in Assen, Netherlands winning a silver medal in Women's Shot Put F35–36 and bronze medals in the Women's Discus F35–36/38 and Women's 100m T36. At the 2011 IPC Athletics World Championships in Christchurch, New Zealand, she won a bronze medal in the Women's Discus F35–36. At her third IPC Athletics World Championships, Lyon, France in 2013, she won bronze medals in the Women's Shot Put and Women's Discus F35/36 events.

In 2015, she was being coached by Hamish MacDonald.
