= Fares Hamdi =

Tunisian Paralympic athlete

Personal information
- Born: 17 April 1980 (age 46)
Medal record
Men's para-athletics
Representing Tunisia
Paralympic Games
Gold medal – first place	2000 Sydney	Long Jump - F37
Gold medal – first place	2004 Athens	4x400m - T35-38
Bronze medal – third place	2008 Beijing	4x100m - T35-38

Fares Hamdi (born 17 April 1980) is a Paralympian athlete from Tunisia competing mainly in category F37 long jump events.

Fares has competed in three Paralympic Games, winning a medal at each one, always in a different event. His first success came in 2000 in Sydney when he won the F37 long jump as well as competing in the T37 long jump. Four years later in Athens he failed in his defence of a long jump gold but did pick up a gold medal as part of the successful Tunisian T35-38 4 × 400 m really team. In his third games in 2008 he again failed in the long jump but this time was part of the bronze medal-winning T35-38 4 × 100 m team from Tunisia.
