= Renata Chilewska =

Polish Paralympic athlete

Medal record

Paralympic athletics

Representing Poland

Paralympic Games
Gold medal – first place	2004 Athens	Javelin Throw – F35-38
Silver medal – second place	1992 Barcelona	Javelin Throw - C5-C8
Silver medal – second place	2004 Athens	Shot Put – F35/36
Bronze medal – third place	2004 Athens	Discus Throw – F35/36/38
Bronze medal – third place	2008 Beijing	Discus Throw – F35-38
Bronze medal – third place	2008 Beijing	Shot Put – F35-36

Renata Chilewska is a Paralympian athlete from Poland competing mainly in the throwing events.

She competed in the 1992 Summer Paralympics in Barcelona, Spain. There she won a silver medal in the women's C5-C8 javelin throw and failed to medal in the C5-C8 shot put and discus throw events

It was then 12 years before she returned to the Paralympics stage with an appearance at the 2004 Summer Paralympics in Athens, Greece where she won a gold medal in the F35-38 javelin throw, a silver medal in the F35/36 shot put and a bronze medal in the F35/36/38 discus throw.

She didn't leave it as long to compete in her third games when she competed in the 2008 Summer Paralympics in Beijing, China. There, she won a bronze medal in the women's F35-36 shot put and the women's F35-38 javelin throw. But failed to medal in the F35/36 discus.
