= Mohamed Krid =

Tunisian paralympic athlete

Personal information
- Full name: Mohamed Ali Krid
- Born: 12 May 1991 (age 35) Gafsa, Tunisia
Medal record
Men's para athletics
Representing Tunisia
Paralympic Games
| Silver medal – second place | 2008 Beijing | Javelin throw F33/34/52 |

Mohamed Ali Krid (born 12 May 1991), also known as Mohamed Krid (Arabic: محمد قريد), is a Paralympian athlete from Tunisia competing mainly in category F34 throwing events.

He competed in the 2008 Summer Paralympics in Beijing, China. There he won a silver medal in the men's F33-34/52 javelin throw event.

Krid also competed in the 2012 Summer Paralympics in javelin, shot put, and discus throw.
