= Mourad Idoudi =

Tunisian Paralympic athlete

Personal information
- Native name: مراد العيدودي
- Nickname: Hadj
- Born: Mourad Idoudi; September 3, 1984 (age 41) Gabes, Tunisia
- Years active: 2002–2008(Track and field F33)
- Height: 1.67 m (5 ft 6 in)
- Weight: 50 kg (110 lb)

Sport
- Country: Tunisia
- Sport: Athletics
- Disability: Cerebral palsy
- Disability class: F33
- Event: Throwing
Medal record
Men's para athletics
Representing Tunisia
Paralympic Games
Gold medal – first place	2008 Beijing	Club Throw - F32/51
Gold medal – first place	2008 Beijing	Discus Throw - F32/51
Silver medal – second place	2008 Beijing	Shot Put - F32
World Championships
Silver medal – second place	2006	Discus Throw F32

Mourad Idoudi (born September 3, 1984) is a Paralympian athlete from Tunisia competing mainly in category F32 throwing events.

Mourad competed at the 2008 Summer Paralympics in Beijing, China where he won gold medals in both the F32/51 club throw and the F32/51 discus as well as a silver in the F32 shot put.
