= Mohamed Charmi =

Tunisian Paralympic athlete

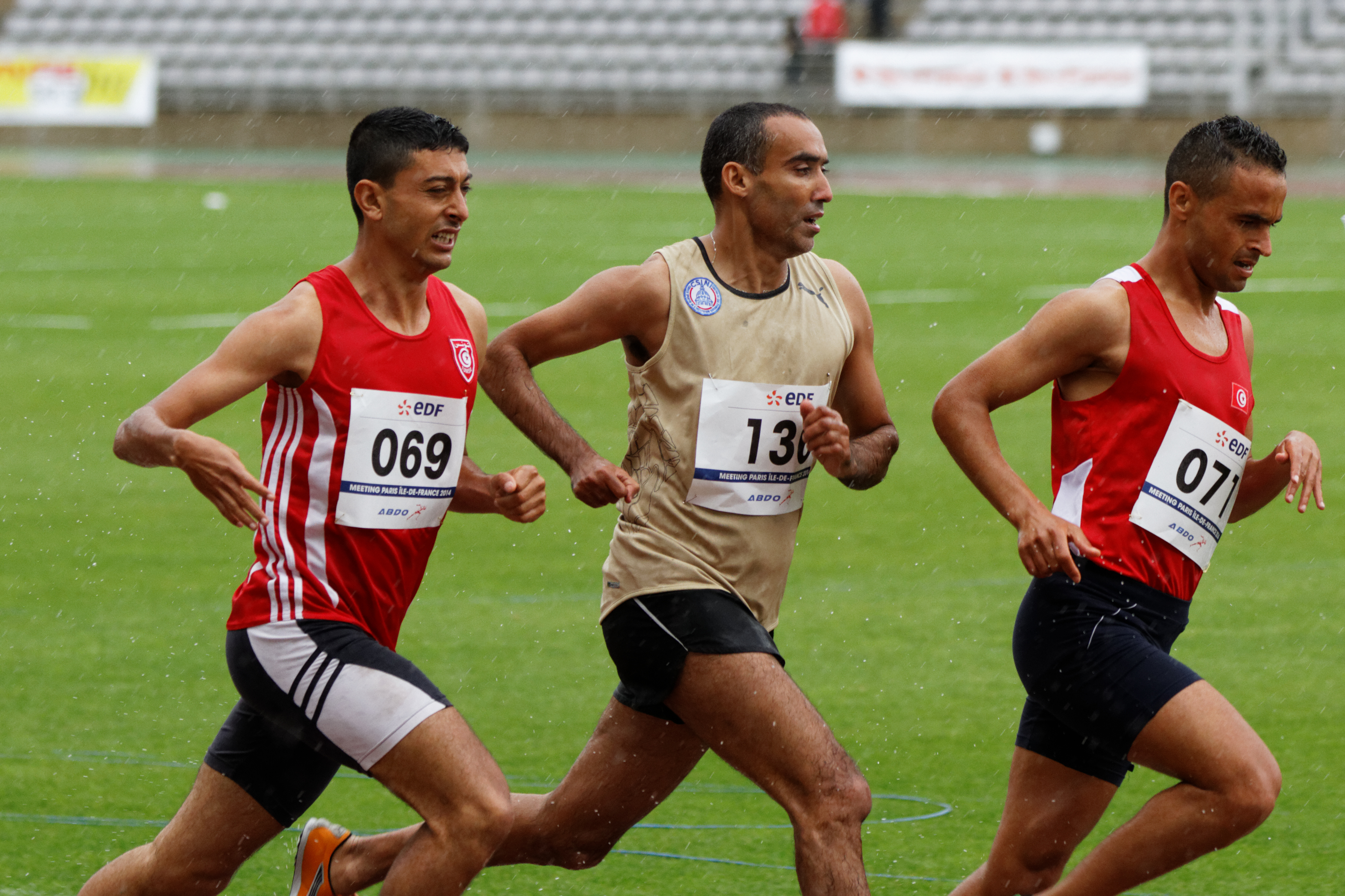
- Mohamed Charmi (left) at Paris Athletics Paralympic Meeting in 2014

Personal information
- Native name: محمد الشرمي
- Born: Mohamed Charmi; May 28, 1981 (age 45)
- Years active: 2002–2012 (Track and field T37)

Sport
- Disability class: T37
Medal record
Men's para athletics
Representing Tunisia
Paralympic Games
Gold medal – first place	2004 Athens	1500 metres - T37
Gold medal – first place	2004 Athens	4x400m - T35-38
Silver medal – second place	2004 Athens	800 metres - T37
Silver medal – second place	2012 London	800 metres - T37
Bronze medal – third place	2008 Beijing	4x400m - T35-38
Bronze medal – third place	2012 London	1500 metres - T37
All-Africa Games
Gold medal – first place	2011 Maputo	800m T37
Silver medal – second place	2011 Maputo	400m T37
Bronze medal – third place	2011 Maputo	100m T37
World Championships
Silver medal – second place	2002	800m T37
Silver medal – second place	2006	800m T37
Bronze medal – third place	2006	1500m T37

Mohamed Charmi (born May 28, 1981) is a Paralympian athlete from Tunisia competing mainly in category T37 middle-distance events.

Mohamed has competed in three Paralympic Games and has picked up 6 medals. His first Games were in 2004 in Athens. He won a gold medal in the T37 1500m and a silver in the T37 800m as well as a second gold as part of the Tunisian T35-38 4 × 400 m. Four years later in Beijing he failed to medal in either the T37 200m or 800m but did win a bronze as part of the Tunisian 4 × 100 m relay team in the T35-38 class race.

== Athletics ==
Men's 1500m - T37

Men's 800m - T37
