= Sonia Mansour =

Tunisian Paralympic athlete

Personal information
- Born: 6 September 1988 (age 37)
Medal record
Women's para athletics
Representing Tunisia
Paralympic Games
Silver medal – second place	2008 Beijing	100m – T38
Silver medal – second place	2008 Beijing	200m – T38

Sonia Mansour (born 6 September 1988) is a Paralympian athlete from Tunisia competing mainly in category T38 sprint events.

She competed in the 2008 Summer Paralympics in Beijing, China. There she won a silver medal in the women's 100 metres – T38 event and a silver medal in the women's 200 metres – T38 event
