= Farhat Chida =

Tunisian Paralympic athlete (born 1982)

Personal information
- Native name: محمد فرحات شيدة
- Born: Mohamed Farhat Chida; September 11, 1982 (age 44)
- Height: 1.83 m (6 ft 0 in)
- Weight: 75 kg (165 lb; 11 st 11 lb)

Sport
- Disability: Cerebral palsy
- Disability class: T38, F38
- Club: Tunisian Federation of Sports for the Disabled: Tunis, TUN
- Coached by: Abdallah Machraoui
Medal record
Men's para-athletics
Representing Tunisia
Paralympic Games
Gold medal – first place	2004 Athens	4x400 m T35–38
Gold medal – first place	2008 Beijing	Long jump F37–38
Gold medal – first place	2008 Beijing	400 m T38
Gold medal – first place	2012 London	400 m T38
Silver medal – second place	2004 Athens	200 m T38
Bronze medal – third place	2004 Athens	100 m T38
Bronze medal – third place	2008 Beijing	4x100 m T35–38
IPC World Championships
Gold medal – first place	2011 Christchurch	400m T38
Silver medal – second place	2006 Assen	100m T38
Silver medal – second place	2006 Assen	200m T38
Silver medal – second place	2011 Christchurch	Long Jump T37-38
Silver medal – second place	2011 Christchurch	200m T38

Mohamed Farhat Chida (Arabic: محمد فرحات شيدة; born September 11, 1982) is a Paralympic athlete from Tunisia competing mainly in category T38 sprint events.

== Biographies ==
Between 1990 and 1997, Mohamed competed in able bodied athletics and cycling, he was injured in a road accident in 2003 and diagnosed with cerebral palsy. He marked his debut in 2004 Summer Paralympics in Athens.

== Achievements ==
He competed in the 2004 Summer Paralympics in Athens, Greece. There he won a gold medal in the men's 4 x 400 metre relay – T35-38 event, a silver medal in the men's 200 metres – T38 event, a bronze medal in the men's 100 metres – T38 event and finished sixth in the men's 400 metres – T38 event.

He also competed at the 2008 Summer Paralympics in Beijing, China. There he won a gold medal in the men's Long jump – F37-38 event, a gold medal in the men's 400 metres – T38 event, a silver medal in the men's 4 x 100 metre relay – T35-38 event, finished fifth in the men's 100 metres – T38 event and finished fourth in the men's 200 metres – T38 event.

At the 2012 Summer Paralympics in London, UK, Mohamed Farhat won a gold medal in the men's 400 metres – T38 event.

== Athletics ==
- Men's 400 m T38
- Men's Long Jump – F37/38
- Men's 100 m T38
- Men's 200 m T38

Hobbies

Travel, music, sport. (Athlete, 14 Dec 2010)

Language(s) spoken

Arabic, French, English

Club name

National Federation of Sports for the Disabled, Tunis, TUN

Coach

Abdallah Machraoui (TUN) from 2010 (Athlete, 14 Dec 2010)

== See also ==
- Tunisia at the 2012 Summer Paralympics
- Tunisia at the Paralympics
