= Abbes Saidi =

Tunisian Paralympic athlete

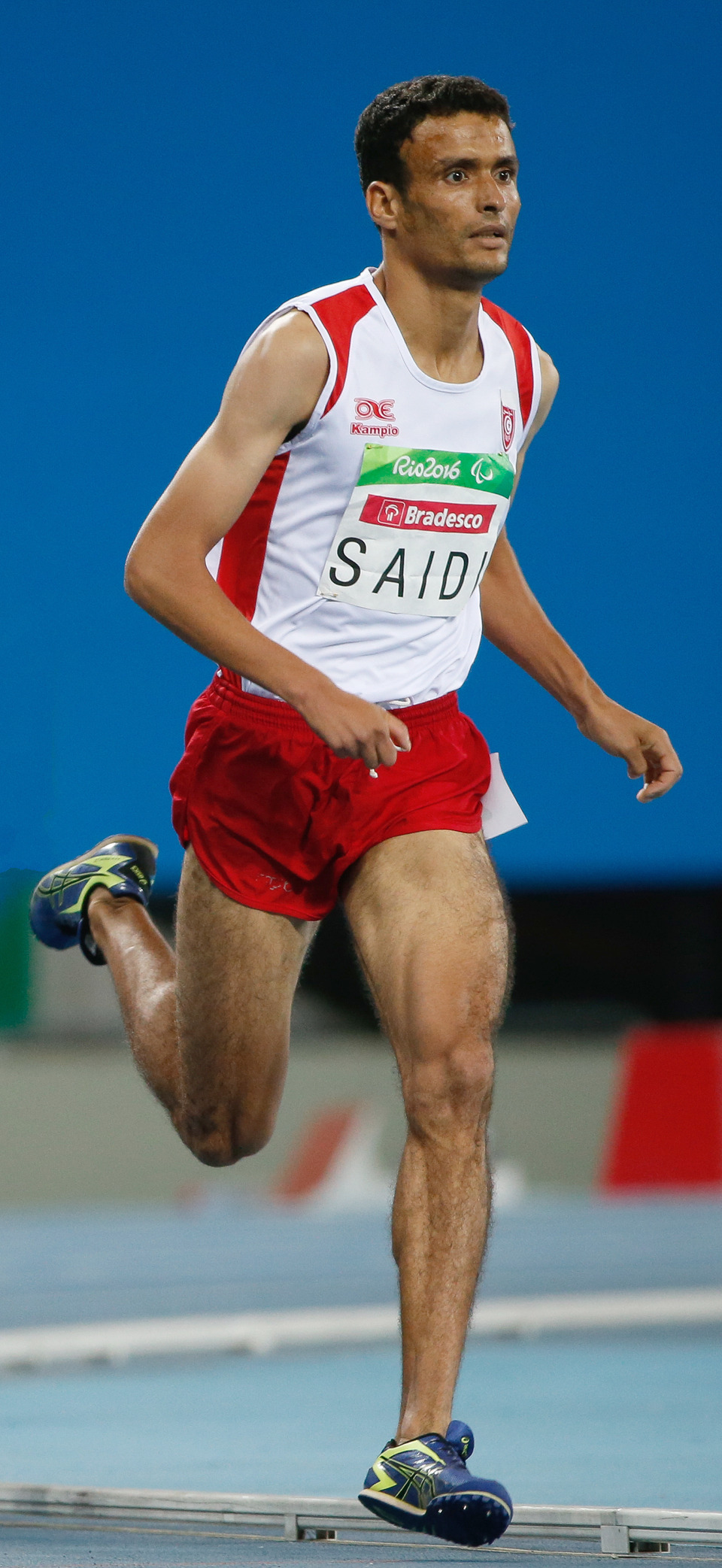
- Saidi at the 2016 Paralympics

Personal information
- Native name: عباس السعايدي
- Born: February 9, 1983 (age 43) Tunisia

Sport
- Sport: Paralympic athletics
- Disability class: T38
- Event(s): T38 – 400 metres T38 – 800 metres T38 – 4 × 400 metres relay T38 – 1500
Medal record
Representing Tunisia
Paralympic Games
Gold medal – first place	2004 Athens	4 × 400 m T35–38
Silver medal – second place	2004 Athens	800 m T38
Silver medal – second place	2008 Beijing	400 m T38
Bronze medal – third place	2008 Beijing	4 × 100 m T35–38
Gold medal – first place	2016 Rio de Janeiro	1500 m T38
IPC World Championships
Gold medal – first place	2015 Doha	1500 m T38
Silver medal – second place	2013 Lyon	1500 m T38
Silver medal – second place	2015 Doha	800 m T38

Abbes Saidi (Arabic: عباس السعايدي; born February 9, 1983) is a Paralympian middle-distance runner from Tunisia. He competed at the 2004, 2008 and 2016 Paralympics and won five medals, including a gold in the 4 × 400 m T35–38 relay in 2004 and a gold in the 1500 m T38 event in 2016.
