= Christopher Mullins =

Australian Paralympic athlete

Personal information
- Full name: Christopher James Mullins
- Nationality: Australia
- Born: 23 November 1986 (age 39) Melbourne, Victoria
- Education: St. Bernard's College (Essendon) (Essendon, Victoria, Australia); La Trobe University

Sport
- Club: Preston Athletics Club
Medal record
Athletics
Paralympic Games
Gold medal – first place	2008 Beijing	Men's 4x100 m T35-38
IPC Athletics World Championships
Gold medal – first place	2006 Assen	Men's 4x400 m Relay T35–38

Christopher "Chris" James Mullins, OAM (born 23 November 1986) is an Australian Paralympic cerebral palsy track and field athlete. He won a gold medal and broke the world record at the 2008 Beijing Games in the Men's 4 × 100 m T35-38 event, for which he received a Medal of the Order of Australia.

== Personal life ==
Mullins completed a Bachelor of Nursing degree in 2010 at La Trobe University. He is currently working as a registered nurse at the Royal Melbourne Hospital. One of Mullins' great passions is the Essendon Football Club.
