= Swimming at the 2004 Summer Paralympics – Men's 4 × 50 metre freestyle relay 20pts =

Men's 4x50m Freestyle 20 pts at the XII Paralympic Games
- Paralympic Swimming
- Venue: Olympic Aquatic Centre
- Dates: 24 September 2004
- Competitors: 11
- Winning time: 2:27.04

Medalists
| 1st place, gold medalist(s) | | Li Peng; He Junquan; Gong Baoren; Du Jian Ping | China |
| 2nd place, silver medalist(s) | | Luis Silva; Joon Sok Seo; Clodoaldo Silva; Adriano Lima | Brazil |
| 3rd place, bronze medalist(s) | | Kenneth Cairns; Gareth Duke; Anthony Stephens; Sascha Kindred | Great Britain |

The Men's 4 x 50 metre freestyle relay 20pts swimming event at the 2004 Summer Paralympics was competed on 24 September. It was won by the team representing China.

== 1st round ==
| Qualified for final round |

Heat 1

24 Sept. 2004, morning session

| Rank | Team | Time | Notes |
|---|---|---|---|
| 1 | Brazil | 2:33.09 | |
| 2 | Japan | 2:37.96 | |
| 3 | China | 2:39.07 | |
| 4 | Thailand | 2:46.41 | |
| 5 | France | 2:48.06 | |
| 6 | Germany | 3:11.25 | |

Heat 2

24 Sept. 2004, morning session

| Rank | Team | Time | Notes |
|---|---|---|---|
| 1 | Great Britain | 2:42.84 | |
| 2 | Czech Republic | 2:45.23 | |
| 3 | Spain | 2:46.77 | |
| 4 | Mexico | 2:57.06 | |
| 5 | United States | 3:07.13 | |

== Final round ==
24 Sept. 2004, evening session

| Rank | Team | Time | Notes |
|---|---|---|---|
| 1st place, gold medalist(s) | China | 2:27.04 | |
| 2nd place, silver medalist(s) | Brazil | 2:32.34 | |
| 3rd place, bronze medalist(s) | Great Britain | 2:37.20 | |
| 4 | Japan | 2:39.78 | |
| 5 | Czech Republic | 2:41.37 | |
| 6 | Thailand | 2:41.43 | |
| 7 | France | 2:47.01 | |
| 8 | Mexico | 3:07.29 | |

== Team Lists ==
| Brazil; Luis Silva; Joon Sok Seo; Clodoaldo Silva; Adriano Lima | Japan; Daisuke Maeda; Takayuki Suzuki; Yuji Hanada; Hiroshi Karube | China; Li Peng; He Junquan; Gong Baoren; Du Jian Ping | Thailand; Sanit Songnork; Taweesook Samuksaneeto; Somchai Doungkaew; Voravit Kaewkham |
| France; Eric Lindmann; David Smétanine; Pascal Pinard; Gaetan Dautresire | Germany; Swen Michaelis; Nils Grunenberg; Sebastian Iwanow; Christian Goldbach | Great Britain; Kenneth Cairns; Gareth Duke; Anthony Stephens; Sascha Kindred | Czech Republic; Tomas Scharf; Petr Andrysek; Jan Povysil; Martin Kovar |
| Spain; Javier Torres; Ricardo Oribe; Jordi Gordillo; Sebastián Rodríguez | Mexico; Pedro Rangel; Vidal Dominguez; Jose Arnulfo Castorena; Juan Ignacio Reyes | United States; Lantz Lamback; Joe McCarthy; Daniel Kamber; Curtis Lovejoy | |
