= Swimming at the 2008 Summer Paralympics – Men's 4 × 50 metre medley relay – 20 points =

Men's 4x50m Medley Relay 20 points at the XIII Paralympic Games
- Venue: Beijing National Aquatics Center
- Dates: 15 September
- Competitors: 9
- Winning time: 2:33.15

Medalists
1st place, gold medalist(s)		China (CHN); Du Jianping, Tang Yuan, Xu Qing, Yang Yuanrun
2nd place, silver medalist(s)		Brazil (BRA); Daniel Dias, Ivanildo Vasconcelos, Luis Silva, Clodoaldo Silva
3rd place, bronze medalist(s)		Spain (ESP); Pablo Cimadevila, Vicente Gil, Daniel Vidal, Sebastián Rodríguez

The men's 4x50m medley relay 20 points event at the 2008 Summer Paralympics took place at the Beijing National Aquatics Center on 15 September. There were two heats; the teams with the eight fastest times advanced to the final.

== Results ==
=== Heats ===
Competed from 10:37.

==== Heat 1 ====
Rank	Lane	Nation	Swimmers	Time	Notes
1	5	United States	Lantz Lamback; Dave Denniston; Roy Perkins; Joe McCarthy	2:46.20	Q
2	4	Spain	Pablo Cimadevila; Vicente Gil; Ricardo Ten; Vicente Javier Torres	3:00.44	Q
3	3	China	He Junquan; Li Hanhua; Li Peng; Tian Rong	3:00.46	Q
4	6	Greece	Stylianos Tsakonas; Konstantinos Karaouzas; Konstantinos Fykas; Ioannis Kostakis	3:15.09	Q

==== Heat 2 ====
Rank	Lane	Nation	Swimmers	Time	Notes
1	5	Ukraine	Iaroslav Semenenko; Dmytro Vynohradets; Iurii Andriushin; Dmytro Kryzhanovskyy	2:51.26	Q
2	4	Brazil	Francisco Avelino; Ivanildo Vasconcelos; Adriano Lima; Clodoaldo Silva	2:54.05	Q
3	2	Thailand	Prajim Rieangsantiea; Taweesook Samuksaneeto; Somchai Duangkeaw; Voravit Kaewkham	2:55.24	Q
4	6	Mexico	Juan Reyes; Pedro Rangel; Vidal Dominguez; Jose Castorena	3:06.32	Q
	3	Russia	Albert Bakaev; Alexey Fomenkov; Ruslan Sadvakasov; Ivan Khmelnitskiy		DSQ

=== Final ===
Competed at 20:27.

Rank	Lane	Nation	Swimmers	Time	Notes
1st place, gold medalist(s)	7	China	Du Jianping; Tang Yuan; Xu Qing; Yang Yuanrun	2:33.15	WR
2nd place, silver medalist(s)	3	Brazil	Daniel Dias; Ivanildo Vasconcelos; Luis Silva; Clodoaldo Silva	2:39.31	
3rd place, bronze medalist(s)	2	Spain	Pablo Cimadevila; Vicente Gil; Daniel Vidal; Sebastián Rodríguez	2:40.38	
4	4	United States	Lantz Lamback; Dave Denniston; Roy Perkins; Joe McCarthy	2:43.00	
5	5	Ukraine	Iaroslav Semenenko; Dmytro Vynohradets; Iurii Andriushin; Dmytro Kryzhanovskyy	2:45.44	
6	6	Thailand	Prajim Rieangsantiea; Taweesook Samuksaneeto; Somchai Duangkeaw; Voravit Kaewkham	2:54.38	
7	1	Mexico	Juan Reyes; Pedro Rangel; Vidal Dominguez; Jose Castorena	3:04.44	
8	8	Greece	Stylianos Tsakonas; Konstantinos Karaouzas; Konstantinos Fykas; Ioannis Kostakis	3:08.79	

Q = qualified for final. WR = World Record.
