= Brazil at the 2008 Summer Paralympics =

- IPC code: BRA
- NPC: Brazilian Paralympic Committee
- Website: www.cpb.org.br

in Beijing
- Competitors: 188 in 17 sports
- Flag bearer: Antônio Tenório Silva
- Medals Ranked 9th: Gold 16 Silver 14 Bronze 17 Total 47

Summer Paralympics appearances (overview)
- 1972; 1976; 1980; 1984; 1988; 1992; 1996; 2000; 2004; 2008; 2012; 2016; 2020; 2024

Brazil sent a delegation to compete at the 2008 Summer Paralympics in Beijing, China The country debuted in the Games in 1972 and 2008 was its 10th participation.

Brazil also sent the largest number of athletes to the Paralympics in its history, with 188 athletes competing in 17 Paralympic sports. Brazil did not include any competitors in the archery and wheelchair rugby. In the Opening Ceremony, the Brazilian Flag bearer was the judoka Antônio Tenório Silva, who became four-time Paralympic champion in his category.

In 2008, Brazil had its second strongest showing in the history of the Games, finishing in respectable 9th place. André Brasil and Daniel Dias, both of swimming and Lucas Prado of athletics were Brazil's top medalists. Prado won three gold medals, Brasil won five medals (four golds and one silver) and Dias won nine medals (four golds, four silvers and one bronze).

== Medallists ==
Medal	Name	Sport	Event
Gold	Lucas Prado	Athletics	Men's 100 m - T11
Gold	Terezinha Guilhermina	Athletics	Women's 200 m - T11
Gold	Lucas Prado	Athletics	Men's 200 m - T11
Gold	Lucas Prado	Athletics	Men's 400 m - T11
Gold	Dirceu Pinto	Boccia	Mixed individual - BC4
Gold	Dirceu Pinto; Eliseu Santos	Boccia	Mixed pairs - BC4
Gold	Brazil national football 5-a-side team Jefferson Gonçalves; Damião Ramos; João Batista Silva; Marcos Felipe; Mizael Oliveira; Ricardo Alves; Sandro Soares; Severino Silva; Andreonni Farias Rego; Fábio Ribeiro Vasconcelos	Football 5-a-side	Men's Football 5-a-side - B1
Gold	Antônio Tenório Silva	Judo	Men's 100 kg
Gold	André Brasil	Swimming	Men's 50 m freestyle - S10
Gold	Daniel Dias	Swimming	Men's 100 m freestyle - S5
Gold	André Brasil	Swimming	Men's 100 m freestyle - S10
Gold	Daniel Dias	Swimming	Men's 200 m freestyle - S5
Gold	André Brasil	Swimming	Men's 400 m freestyle - S10
Gold	Daniel Dias	Swimming	Men's 50 m backstroke - S5
Gold	André Brasil	Swimming	Men's 100 m butterfly - S10
Gold	Daniel Dias	Swimming	Men's 200 m individual medley - SM5
Silver	Tito Sena	Athletics	Men's marathon - T46
Silver	André Luiz Oliveira; Yohansson Nascimento; Claudemir Santos; Alan Fonteles Cardoso Oliveira	Athletics	Men's 4 × 100 m relay - T42-46
Silver	Terezinha Guilhermina	Athletics	Women's 100 m - T11
Silver	Shirlene Coelho	Athletics	Women's javelin throw - F35-38
Silver	Daniel Dias	Swimming	Men's 100 m breaststroke - SB4
Silver	Daniel Dias	Swimming	Men's 50 m butterfly - S5
Silver	Karla Cardoso	Judo	Women's 48 kg
Silver	Deanne Silva	Judo	Women's +70 kg
Silver	André Brasil	Swimming	Men's 200 m individual medley - SM10
Silver	Daniel Dias; Ivanildo Vasconcelos; Luis Silva; Clodoaldo Silva	Swimming	Men's 4x50 m medley relay - 20 pts
Silver	Daniel Dias	Swimming	Men's 50 m freestyle - S5
Silver	Phelipe Rodrigues	Swimming	Men's 50 m freestyle - S10
Silver	Phelipe Rodrigues	Swimming	Men's 100 m freestyle - S10
Silver	Welder Knaf; Luiz Algacir Silva	Table tennis	Men's team - Class 3
Bronze	Odair Santos	Athletics	Men's 800 m - T12
Bronze	Odair Santos	Athletics	Men's 5000 m - T13
Bronze	Odair Santos	Athletics	Men's 10000 m - T12
Bronze	Ádria Santos	Athletics	Women's 100 m - T11
Bronze	Jerusa Santos	Athletics	Women's 200 m - T11
Bronze	Yohansson Nascimento	Athletics	Men's 100 m - T46
Bronze	Terezinha Guilhermina	Athletics	Women's 400 m - T12
Bronze	Eliseu Santos	Boccia	Mixed individual - BC4
Bronze	Marcos Alves	Equestrian	Individual championship test - Grade Ib
Bronze	Marcos Alves	Equestrian	Individual freestyle test - Grade Ib
Bronze	Michelle Ferreira	Judo	Women's 52 kg
Bronze	Daniele Silva	Judo	Women's 57 kg
Bronze	Elton Santana; Josiane Lima	Rowing	Mixed double sculls - TA
Bronze	Verônica Almeida	Swimming	Women's 50 m butterfly - S7
Bronze	Edênia Garcia	Swimming	Women's 50 m freestyle - S4
Bronze	Fabiana Sugimori	Swimming	Women's 50 m freestyle - S11
Bronze	Clodoaldo Silva; Joon Seo; Daniel Dias; Adriano Lima	Swimming	Men's 4x50 m freestyle relay - 20 pts

Medals by sport
Sport	1st place, gold medalist(s)	2nd place, silver medalist(s)	3rd place, bronze medalist(s)	Total
Swimming	8	7	4	19
Athletics	4	4	7	15
Boccia	2	0	1	3
Judo	1	2	2	5
Football 5-a-side	1	0	0	1
Table tennis	0	1	0	1
Equestrian	0	0	2	2
Rowing	0	0	1	1
Total	16	14	17	47

Medals by gender
Gender	Gold medal	Silver medal	Bronze medal	Total
Male	13	10	5	28
Female	1	4	8	13
Mixed	2	0	4	6
Total	16	14	17	47

== Sports ==
=== Athletics ===
==== Men's track ====
Athlete	Class	Event	Heats		Semifinal		Final	
Athlete	Class	Event	Result	Rank	Result	Rank	Result	Rank
Jose Carlos Alecrim	T46	800m	2:06.37	20	did not advance			
Jose Carlos Alecrim	T46	1500m	4:15.54	19	did not advance			
Andre Luiz Andrade	T13	200m	DSQ		did not advance			
Gilson Anjos	T13	400m	53.39	11	did not advance			
Gilson Anjos	T13	1500m	4:29.80	17	did not advance			
Ozivan Bonfim	T46	Marathon	—N/a				2:35:31	5
Christiano Farias	T11	1500m	4:21.32	7	did not advance			
Christiano Farias	T11	5000m	—N/a				16:38.15	6
Felipe Gomes	T11	100m	11.55	8 q	11.57	7 B	11.72	4
Felipe Gomes	T11	200m	23.90	8 q	DNS		did not advance	
Pedro Guilhermino	T12	400m	56.14	13	did not advance			
Pedro Guilhermino	T12	800m	DNS		did not advance			
Alex Mendonça	T12	10000m	—N/a				33:48.45	7
Alex Mendonça	T12	Marathon	—N/a				2:44:50	17
Pedro Cesar Moraes	T12	100m	11.84	22	did not advance			
Pedro Cesar Moraes	T12	200m	DNS		did not advance			
Yohansson Nascimento	T46	100m	11.18	5 Q	—N/a		11.25	3rd place, bronze medalist(s)
Yohansson Nascimento	T46	200m	22.92	6 q	—N/a		22.53	5
Yohansson Nascimento	T46	400m	59.76	15	did not advance			
Moises Neto	T46	5000m	—N/a				DNF	
Moises Neto	T46	Marathon	—N/a				2:41:32	9
Alan Oliveira	T44	200m	24.31	7 q	—N/a		24.21	7
Andre Luiz Oliveira	T44	100m	12.12	10	did not advance			
Nelson Pereira	T13	800m	—N/a				2:02.81	7
Nelson Pereira	T13	1500m	4:20.09	15	did not advance			
Edson Pinheiro	T38	100m	—N/a				11.30	4
Edson Pinheiro	T38	200m	23.62	5 q	—N/a		23.46	6
Edson Pinheiro	T38	400m	—N/a				DNF	
Lucas Prado	T11	100m	11.19 WR	1 Q	11.20	1 Q	11.03 WR	1st place, gold medalist(s)
Lucas Prado	T11	200m	23.24	3 Q	22.71 PR	1 Q	22.48 WR	1st place, gold medalist(s)
Lucas Prado	T11	400m	51.84	2 Q	51.84	2 Q	50.27	1st place, gold medalist(s)
Aurelio Santos	T12	10000m	—N/a				DNF	
Aurelio Santos	T12	Marathon	—N/a				DNF	
Claudemir Santos	T46	200m	1:09.60	21	did not advance			
Odair Santos	T12	800m	1:56.77	3 Q	—N/a		1:53.73	3rd place, bronze medalist(s)
Odair Santos	T12	5000m	15:09.90	1 Q	—N/a		14:50.35	3rd place, bronze medalist(s)
Odair Santos	T12	10000m	—N/a				31:57.91	3rd place, bronze medalist(s)
Tito Sena	T46	5000m	—N/a				15:32.32	9
Tito Sena	T46	Marathon	—N/a				2:30:49	2nd place, silver medalist(s)
Jose Ribeiro Silva	T37	100m	12.58	11	did not advance			
Jose Ribeiro Silva	T37	200m	26.06	13	did not advance			
Ariosvaldo Silva	T53	100m	15.46	6 Q	—N/a		15.40	8
Ariosvaldo Silva	T53	200m	28.56	12	did not advance			
Ariosvaldo Silva	T53	400m	DNS		did not advance			
Carlos Barto Silva	T11	1500m	4:16.29	4 q	—N/a		4:14.80	5
Carlos Barto Silva	T11	5000m	—N/a				DNF	
Daniel Silva	T11	100m	11.52	7 q	11.55	6 B	11.56	1
Daniel Silva	T11	200m	23.20	2 Q	23.17	4 Q	23.38	4
Daniel Silva	T11	400m	52.47	3 Q	51.93	4 q	52.05	4
Antonio Souza	T46	200m	DNS		did not advance			
Emicarlo Souza	T46	400m	50.06	6 q	—N/a		49.54	4
Emicarlo Souza	T46	800m	2:01.26	15	did not advance			
Julio Cesar Souza	T12	100m	11.46	10 q	11.45	12	did not advance	
Julio Cesar Souza	T12	200m	23.54	16	did not advance			
Julio Cesar Souza	T12	400m	52.87	12	did not advance			
Andre Luiz Andrade; Felipe Gomes; Lucas Prado; Julio Cesar Souza	T11-13	4 × 100 m relay	DSQ		did not advance			
Yohansson Nascimento; Alan Oliveira; Andre Luiz Oliveira; Claudemir Santos	T42-46	4 × 100 m relay	—N/a				45.25	2nd place, silver medalist(s)

==== Men's field ====
Athlete	Class	Event	Final		
Athlete	Class	Event	Result	Points	Rank
Leonardo Amâncio	F57-58	Discus throw	50.54 SB	947	7
Leonardo Amâncio	F57-58	Shot put	12.80	856	13
Marco Aurélio Borges	F44	Discus throw	41.53	768	9
Jonathan de Souza Santos	F40	Shot put	10.53	-	5
Felipe Gomes	F11	Triple jump	DNS		
André Luiz Oliveira	F42/44	Long jump	6.19	957	7
Paulo Souza	F35-36	Discus throw	34.10	977	6
Paulo Souza	F35-36	Javelin throw	39.72 SB	1073	4
Paulo Souza	F35-36	Shot put	9.92	795	9

==== Women's track ====
Athlete	Class	Event	Heats		Semifinals		Final	
Athlete	Class	Event	Result	Rank	Result	Rank	Result	Rank
Maria José Alves	T12	100m	13.36	11 q	13.21	10	did not advance	
Maria José Alves	T12	200m	27.16	11	did not advance			
Maria José Alves	T12	400m	1:01.79	6 B	—N/a		DNS	
Sheila Finder	T46	200m	28.01	14	did not advance			
Terezinha Guilhermina	T11	100m	12.48	2 Q	—N/a		12.40	2nd place, silver medalist(s)
Terezinha Guilhermina	T11	200m	25.16	1 Q	—N/a		25.14	1st place, gold medalist(s)
Terezinha Guilhermina	T12	400m	57.70	3 Q	—N/a		57.02	3rd place, bronze medalist(s)
Sirlene Guilhermino	T12	100m	12.95	5 Q	12.88	6 B	12.95	6
Sirlene Guilhermino	T12	200m	26.57	8 q	26.91	8	did not advance	
Sirlene Guilhermino	T12	400m	1:02.08	7 B	—N/a		DNS	
Indayana Martins	T13	100m	13.68	13	did not advance			
Indayana Martins	T13	200m	28.41	11	did not advance			
Indayana Martins	T13	400m	1:05.56	10	did not advance			
Ádria Santos	T11	100m	13.11	4 Q	—N/a		13.07	3rd place, bronze medalist(s)
Ádria Santos	T11	200m	27.37	7 B	—N/a		28.15	8
Jenifer Santos	T38	100m	14.69	6 Q	—N/a		14.31	4
Jenifer Santos	T38	200m	31.22	9	did not advance			
Jerusa Santos	T11	100m	13.16	7 B	—N/a		12.99	5
Jerusa Santos	T11	200m	26.05	3 Q	—N/a		26.09	3rd place, bronze medalist(s)
Fernanda Silva	T46	200m	27.47	13	did not advance			
Joana Silva	T13	100m	13.17	11	did not advance			
Joana Silva	T13	200m	26.78	8 q	—N/a		26.85	7
Joana Silva	T13	400m	1:01.46	8 q	—N/a		1:02.08	7
Ana Tércia Soares	T12	100m	13.20	10 q	13.24	11	did not advance	
Ana Tércia Soares	T12	200m	26.95	10	did not advance			

==== Women's field ====
Athlete	Class	Event	Final		
Athlete	Class	Event	Result	Points	Rank
Shirlene Coelho	F35-38	Javelin throw	35.95	1513	2nd place, silver medalist(s)
Shirlene Coelho	F37-38	Discus throw	22.25	757	13
Shirlene Coelho	F37-38	Shot put	10.09	984	8
Sônia Gouveia	F33-34/52-53	Javelin throw	8.57	753	16
Suely Guimarães	F54-56	Discus throw	21.98 SB	838	8
Suely Guimarães	F54-56	Shot put	6.68 SB	803	13
Rosenei Herrera	F35-36	Discus throw	13.42	623	11
Rosenei Herrera	F35-36	Shot put	6.94	780	7
Rosenei Herrera	F35-38	Javelin throw	14.59 SB	841	13
Indayana Martins	F13	Long jump	4.10	-	12
Roseane Santos	F57-58	Discus throw	30.51	970	7
Roseane Santos	F57-58	Shot put	9.06	932	7

=== Boccia ===
Athlete	Event	Preliminaries			Quarterfinals	Semifinals	Final	
Athlete	Event	Opponent	Opposition Score	Rank	Opposition Score	Opposition Score	Opposition Score	Rank
Dirceu Pinto	Mixed individual BC4	F Pereira (POR)	W 7–4	2 Q	Ni (CHN); W 12–0	E Santos (BRA); W 9–2	Leung Y W (HKG); W 3–1	1st place, gold medalist(s)
Dirceu Pinto	Mixed individual BC4	Valentim (POR)	L 2–4	2 Q	Ni (CHN); W 12–0	E Santos (BRA); W 9–2	Leung Y W (HKG); W 3–1	1st place, gold medalist(s)
Dirceu Pinto	Mixed individual BC4	Gyurkota (HUN)	W 4–1	2 Q	Ni (CHN); W 12–0	E Santos (BRA); W 9–2	Leung Y W (HKG); W 3–1	1st place, gold medalist(s)
Eliseu Santos	Mixed individual BC4	Qi C (CHN)	L 3–8	2 Q	Lau (HKG); W 7–3	Pinto (BRA); L 2–9	Dueso (ESP); W 7–1	3rd place, bronze medalist(s)
Eliseu Santos	Mixed individual BC4	Prochazka (CZE)	W 8–0	2 Q	Lau (HKG); W 7–3	Pinto (BRA); L 2–9	Dueso (ESP); W 7–1	3rd place, bronze medalist(s)
Eliseu Santos	Mixed individual BC4	Desamparados Baixauli (ESP)	W 12–0	2 Q	Lau (HKG); W 7–3	Pinto (BRA); L 2–9	Dueso (ESP); W 7–1	3rd place, bronze medalist(s)
Dirceu Pinto; Eliseu Santos	Pairs BC4	Dueso (ESP) / Desamparados Baixauli (ESP)	L 0–5	2 Q	—N/a	Kratina (CZE) / Prochazka (CZE); W 4–1	F Pereira (POR) / Valentim (POR); W 5–2	1st place, gold medalist(s)
Dirceu Pinto; Eliseu Santos	Pairs BC4	Durkovic (SVK) / Streharsky (SVK)	W 6–0	2 Q	—N/a	Kratina (CZE) / Prochazka (CZE); W 4–1	F Pereira (POR) / Valentim (POR); W 5–2	1st place, gold medalist(s)
Dirceu Pinto; Eliseu Santos	Pairs BC4	Beres (HUN) / Gyurkota (HUN)	W 6–2	2 Q	—N/a	Kratina (CZE) / Prochazka (CZE); W 4–1	F Pereira (POR) / Valentim (POR); W 5–2	1st place, gold medalist(s)

=== Cycling ===
==== Men's road ====
Athlete	Event	Time	Rank
Flaviano Carvalho	Men's road race LC3/LC4/CP3	1:39:15	14
Flaviano Carvalho	Men's road time trial LC3	40:44.90	9
Soelito Gohr	Men's road race LC1/LC2/CP4	1:46:13	6
Soelito Gohr	Men's road time trial LC1	35:50.02	6

==== Men's track ====
Athlete	Event	Qualification		Final	
Athlete	Event	Time	Rank	Opposition Time	Rank
Flaviano Carvalho	Men's individual pursuit LC3	DSQ		did not advance	
Flaviano Carvalho	Men's time trial LC3-4	—N/a		1:29.00	19
Soelito Gohr	Men's individual pursuit LC1	4:50.11	4 q	Triboli (ITA); L 4:53.41	4
Soelito Gohr	Men's time trial LC1	—N/a		1:13.56	9

=== Equestrian ===
==== Individual events ====
Athlete	Horse	Event	Total	
Athlete	Horse	Event	Score	Rank
Marco Alves	Luthenay De Vernay	Mixed individual championship test grade Ib	67.714	3rd place, bronze medalist(s)
Marco Alves	Luthenay De Vernay	Mixed individual freestyle test grade Ib	67.333	3rd place, bronze medalist(s)
Elisa Melaranci	Lester	Mixed individual championship test grade II	59.091	15
Elisa Melaranci	Lester	Mixed individual freestyle test grade II	66.277	7
Davi Mesquita	Neho De La Jonchere	Mixed individual championship test grade Ib	56.952	14
Davi Mesquita	Neho De La Jonchere	Mixed individual freestyle test grade Ib	54.444	15
Sérgio Oliva	Neho De La J.	Mixed individual championship test grade Ia	60.900	8
Sérgio Oliva	Neho De La J.	Mixed individual freestyle test grade Ia	63.556	8

==== Team ====
Athlete	Horse	Event	Individual score			Total	
Athlete	Horse	Event	TT	CT	Total	Score	Rank
Marcos Alves	See above	Team	62.823	67.714	130.537*	364.405	11
Elisa Melaranci	See above	Team	61.524	59.091	120.615*	364.405	11
Davi Mesquita	See above	Team	44.941	56.952	101.893	364.405	11
Sérgio Oliva	See above	Team	52.353	60.900	113.253*	364.405	11

* - denotes highest scores counted towards total score.

=== Football 5-a-side ===
The Brazilian football 5-a-side team won the gold medal after defeating China in the gold medal match.

==== Players ====
- Ricardo Alves
- Andreonni Farias Rego
- Marcos Felipe
- Jefferson Gonçalves
- Mizael Oliveira
- Damião Ramos
- Fábio Ribeiro Vasconcelos
- João Batista Silva
- Severino Silva
- Sandro Soares

==== Tournament ====
7 September 2008
13:30

Brazil	3 - 0	South Korea

Olympic Green Hockey Field
9 September 2008
11:00

Spain	1 - 0	Brazil

Olympic Green Hockey Field
11 September 2008
9:00

Brazil	0 – 0	Argentina

Olympic Green Hockey Field
Attendance: 1,500
Referee: Ilias Mastoras (Greece)
13 September 2008
11:00

Great Britain	0 - 5	Brazil

Olympic Green Hockey Field
15 September 2008
13:00

Brazil	1 - 1	China

Olympic Green Hockey Field

Gold medal match

17 September 2008
13:30

China	1 - 2	Brazil

Olympic Green Hockey Field
Referee: Ilias Mastoras (Greece)

=== Football 7-a-side ===
The Brazilian football 7-a-side team didn't win any medals; they were defeated by Iran in the bronze medal match.

==== Players ====
- Fabiano Bruzzi
- Adriano Costa
- Irineu Ferreira
- Marcos Ferreira
- José Guimarães
- Leandro Marinho
- Gilberto Moraes
- Wanderson Oliveira
- Antônio Rocha
- Luciano Rocha
- Jean Rodrigues
- Marcos Silva

==== Tournament ====
8 September 2008
11:15

Brazil	1 - 0	Netherlands

Olympic Green Hockey Field
10 September 2008
15:45

China	0 - 8	Brazil

Olympic Green Hockey Field
12 September 2008
9:00

Brazil	0 - 3	Russia

Olympic Green Hockey Field

Semi-final

14 September 2008
14:00

Ukraine	6 - 0	Brazil

Olympic Green Hockey Field

Bronze medal match

16 September 2008
14:00

Brazil	0 - 4	Iran

Olympic Green Hockey Field
Attendance: 11,266
Referee: Jorge Eduardo Barbisan (Argentina)

=== Goalball ===
==== Men's tournament ====
The men's team didn't win any medals; they were 11th out of 12 teams.

Players

- Alexsander Celente
- Thiago Henrique Firmino da Costa
- Legy Freire
- Paulo Homem
- Romário Marques
- Luiz Silva Filho

Results

7 September 2008

Sweden	8 - 6	Brazil

Beijing Institute of Technology Gymnasium
8 September 2008

Brazil	5 - 8	Iran

Beijing Institute of Technology Gymnasium
9 September 2008

United States	6 - 4	Brazil

Beijing Institute of Technology Gymnasium
10 September 2008

Brazil	4 - 14	China

Beijing Institute of Technology Gymnasium
11 September 2008

Canada	3 - 6	Brazil

Beijing Institute of Technology Gymnasium

11/12th classification

12 September 2008

Brazil	7 - 3	Spain

Beijing Institute of Technology Gymnasium

==== Women's tournament ====
The women's team didn't win any medals; they were 6th out of 8 teams.

Players

- Adriana Bonifácio Lino
- Ana Carolina Duarte Ruas Custódio
- Cláudia Paula Gonçalves de Amorim Oliveira
- Simone Rocha
- Neuzimar Santos
- Luana Silva

Results

7 September 2008

Brazil	3 - 5	China

Beijing Institute of Technology Gymnasium
8 September 2008

Canada	5 - 6	Brazil

Beijing Institute of Technology Gymnasium
9 September 2008

Brazil	3 - 1	Germany

Beijing Institute of Technology Gymnasium
10 September 2008

United States	2 - 2	Brazil

Beijing Institute of Technology Gymnasium
11 September 2008

Brazil	4 - 5	Sweden

Beijing Institute of Technology Gymnasium
12 September 2008

Japan	3 - 1	Brazil

Beijing Institute of Technology Gymnasium
13 September 2008

Brazil	0–0	Denmark

Beijing Institute of Technology Gymnasium

=== Judo ===
==== Men ====
Athlete	Event	First Round	Quarterfinals	Semifinals	Repechage round 1	Repechage round 2	Final/ Bronze medal contest
Athlete	Event	Opposition Result	Opposition Result	Opposition Result	Opposition Result	Opposition Result	Opposition Result
Eduardo Amaral	Men's 66kg	Alishov (AZE); L 0000–0001	did not advance				
Helder Araujo	Men's 60kg	Li X (CHN); L 0001–0101	—N/a		Quilter (GBR); L 0000–1010	did not advance	
Antônio Tenório Silva	Men's 100kg	Nadri (IRI); W 1001–0000	Porter (USA); W 1001–0000	Lyivytskyi (UKR); W 1011–0000	—N/a		Sardarov (AZE); W 1101-0000 (gold)

==== Women ====
Athlete	Event	First Round	Quarterfinals	Semifinals	Repechage round 1	Repechage round 2	Final/ Bronze medal contest
Athlete	Event	Opposition Result	Opposition Result	Opposition Result	Opposition Result	Opposition Result	Opposition Result
Michelle Ferreira	Women's 52kg	Tsuchiya (JPN); W 1010–0000	—N/a	Cui (CHN); L 0001–0010	—N/a		S Hernandez (ESP); W 1000-0000 (bronze)
Karla Cardoso	Women's 48kg	—N/a	Halinska (UKR); W 0200–0000	M Gonzalez (CUB); W 0002–0001	—N/a		Guo H (CHN); L 0000-1010 (silver)
Daniele Silva	Women's 57kg	Merenciano (ESP); L 0042–0101	—N/a			Buzmakova (RUS); W 1000–0000	Karkar (ALG); W 0100-0000 (bronze)
Deanne Silva	Women's +70kg	de Pinies (ESP); W 1000–0010	—N/a	Komatsu (JPN); W 1011–0000	—N/a		Yuan Y (CHN); L 0000-1010 (silver)
Lucia Teixeira	Women's 63kg	Arce (ESP); L 0001–1001	—N/a		Quessandier (FRA); L 0100–1001	did not advance	

=== Powerlifting ===
==== Men ====
Athlete	Event	Result	Rank
João Euzébio	82.5kg	170.0	9
Alexsander Whitaker	67.5kg	172.5	10

==== Women ====
Athlete	Event	Result	Rank
Josilene Ferreira	67.5kg	100.0	5
Maria Oliveira	44kg	82.5	5

=== Rowing ===
Athlete	Event	Heats		Repechage		Final	
Athlete	Event	Time	Rank	Time	Rank	Time	Rank
Antony Bonfim	Men's single sculls	5:55.07	10 R	6:21.27	9 FB	5:52.23	3
Claudia Santos	Women's single sculls	6:14.76	10 R	6:57.12	4 FA	6:54.76	6
Josiane Lima; Elton Santana	Mixed double sculls	4:18.45	2 FA	—N/a		4:28.36	3rd place, bronze medalist(s)
Silva Nilton Alonco; Andre Dutra; Norma Moura; Luciano Pires; Regiane Silva	Mixed coxed four	3:40.41	5 R	3:49.76	4 FB	3:50.37	1

=== Shooting ===
==== Men ====
Athlete	Event	Qualification		Final		
Athlete	Event	Score	Rank	Score	Total	Rank
Carlos Garletti	Men's 50m rifle 3 positions SH1	1116	17	did not advance		
Carlos Garletti	Mixed 50m rifle prone SH1	573	34	did not advance		

=== Swimming ===
==== Men ====
Athlete	Class	Event	Heats		Final	
Athlete	Class	Event	Result	Rank	Result	Rank
Genezi Andrade	S3	50m backstroke	59.04	6 Q	59.25	7
Genezi Andrade	S3	100m freestyle	2:07.59	7 Q	2:06.02	6
Genezi Andrade	S3	200m freestyle	—N/a		4:15.50	5
Francisco Avelino	S5	50m backstroke	47.29	8 Q	47.28	8
Francisco Avelino	SB4	100m breaststroke	2:04.01	12	did not advance	
Moises Batista	SB3	50m breaststroke	1:03.24	8 Q	1:01.87	8
Moises Batista	SM4	150m individual medley	3:08.13	9	did not advance	
André Brasil	S10	100m backstroke	1:04.44	5 Q	1:03.63	4
André Brasil	S10	100m butterfly	59.13 PR	1 Q	56.47 WR	1st place, gold medalist(s)
André Brasil	S10	50m freestyle	24.55	1 Q	23.61 WR	1st place, gold medalist(s)
André Brasil	S10	100m freestyle	54.27	1 Q	51.38 WR	1st place, gold medalist(s)
André Brasil	S10	400m freestyle	4:23.48	4 Q	4:05.84 PR	1st place, gold medalist(s)
André Brasil	SM10	200m individual medley	2:20.40	6 Q	2:14.20	2nd place, silver medalist(s)
Mauro Brasil	S9	50m freestyle	27.18	12	did not advance	
Marcelo Collet	S10	100m freestyle	57.96	15	did not advance	
Marcelo Collet	S10	400m freestyle	4:23.93	5 Q	4:23.35	6
Daniel Dias	S5	50m backstroke	36.46 WR	2 Q	35.28	1st place, gold medalist(s)
Daniel Dias	S5	50m butterfly	38.79	3 Q	36.25	2nd place, silver medalist(s)
Daniel Dias	S5	50m freestyle	34.95	5 Q	33.56	2nd place, silver medalist(s)
Daniel Dias	S5	100m freestyle	1:14.14	1 Q	1:11.05	1st place, gold medalist(s)
Daniel Dias	S5	200m freestyle	—N/a		2:32.32 WR	1st place, gold medalist(s)
Daniel Dias	SB4	100m breaststroke	1:41.74	2 Q	1:40.39	2nd place, silver medalist(s)
Daniel Dias	SM5	200m individual medley	2:59.04 PR	1 Q	2:52.60 WR	1st place, gold medalist(s)
Carlos Farrenberg	S13	50m freestyle	25.01	4 Q	24.62	4
Carlos Farrenberg	S13	100m freestyle	54.97	3 Q	54.70	5
Carlos Farrenberg	S13	400m freestyle	4:29.45	3 Q	4:27.16	5
Carlos Farrenberg	SM13	200m individual medley	2:34.19	14	did not advance	
Gabriel Feiten	S2	50m backstroke	1:12.27	4 Q	1:15.77	8
Gabriel Feiten	S2	50m freestyle	1:17.85	8 Q	1:15.14	7
Gabriel Feiten	S2	100m freestyle	2:35.83	6 Q	2:33.72	5
Gabriel Feiten	S2	200m freestyle	5:19.41	4 Q	5:38.42	8
Adriano Lima	S6	50m freestyle	32.98	8 Q	32.85	8
Adriano Lima	S6	100m freestyle	1:10.90	4 Q	1:10.91	5
Adriano Lima	S6	400m freestyle	5:27.10	4 Q	5:22.90	4
Adriano Lima	SB5	100m breaststroke	1:47.10	9	did not advance	
Adriano Pereira	S2	50m backstroke	1:13.50	6 Q	1:13.69	5
Adriano Pereira	S2	50m freestyle	1:14.74	7 Q	1:15.41	8
Adriano Pereira	S2	100m freestyle	2:36.14	7 Q	2:32.45	4
Adriano Pereira	S2	200m freestyle	5:21.11	5 Q	5:21.35	5
Rodrigo Ribeiro	SB11	100m breaststroke	1:28.02	12	did not advance	
Phelipe Rodrigues	S10	50m freestyle	24.77	2 Q	24.64	2nd place, silver medalist(s)
Phelipe Rodrigues	S10	100m freestyle	55.07	4 Q	54.22	2nd place, silver medalist(s)
Phelipe Rodrigues	S10	400m freestyle	4:29.36	10	did not advance	
Danielson Santos	S6	50m freestyle	37.13	15	did not advance	
Danielson Santos	SB6	100m breaststroke	1:36.05	6 Q	1:36.51	7
Joon Seo	S4	50m backstroke	56.70	11	did not advance	
Joon Seo	S4	200m freestyle	3:59.65	10	did not advance	
Clodoaldo Silva	S5	50m backstroke	48.16	11	did not advance	
Clodoaldo Silva	S5	50m butterfly	44.75	7 Q	45.74	8
Clodoaldo Silva	S5	50m freestyle	34.86	3 Q	35.22	7
Clodoaldo Silva	S5	100m freestyle	1:18.81	5 Q	1:21.14	6
Clodoaldo Silva	S5	200m freestyle	—N/a		2:50.89	5
Luis Silva	S6	50m butterfly	36.24	8 Q	37.90	8
Luis Silva	S6	50m freestyle	35.67	14	did not advance	
Gledson Soares	S8	100m backstroke	1:19.13	14	did not advance	
Gledson Soares	SB6	100m breaststroke	1:41.27	9	did not advance	
Gledson Soares	SM7	200m individual medley	3:08.72	12	did not advance	
Ivanildo Vasconcelos	SB4	100m breaststroke	1:49.38	6 Q	1:47.86	6
Ivanildo Vasconcelos	SM5	200m individual medley	3:42.56	6 Q	3:30.58	6
Daniel Dias; Adriano Lima; Joon Seo; Clodoaldo Silva	N/A	4x50m freestyle relay	—N/a		2:30.17	3rd place, bronze medalist(s)
André Brasil; Mauro Brasil; Daniel Dias; Phelipe Rodrigues	N/A	4 × 100 m freestyle relay	—N/a		3:55.78	4
Francisco Avelino; Adriano Lima; Clodoaldo Silva; Ivanildo Vasconcelos	N/A	4x50m medley relay	2:54.05	2 Q	2:39.31	2nd place, silver medalist(s)
André Brasil; Marcelo Collet; Daniel Dias; Phelipe Rodrigues	N/A	4 × 100 m medley relay	4:41.04	8 Q	4:40.01	8

==== Women ====
Athlete	Class	Event	Heats		Final	
Athlete	Class	Event	Result	Rank	Result	Rank
Verônica Almeida	S7	50m butterfly	40.19	5 Q	38.49	3rd place, bronze medalist(s)
Rildene Firmino	SM4	150m individual medley	—N/a		4:05.00	6
Edênia Garcia	S4	50m freestyle	—N/a		53.28	3rd place, bronze medalist(s)
Edênia Garcia	S4	100m freestyle	1:59.11	4 Q	1:58.02	4
Valeria Lira	S8	100m butterfly	1:32.58	11	did not advance	
Valeria Lira	S8	400m freestyle	5:46.96	8 Q	5:48.87	8
Fabiana Sugimori	S11	50m freestyle	32.90	3 Q	32.45	3rd place, bronze medalist(s)
Fabiana Sugimori	S11	100m freestyle	1:15.24	8 Q	1:13.40	6

=== Table tennis ===
==== Men ====
Athlete	Event	Preliminaries				First Round	Quarterfinals	Semifinals	Final / BM	
Athlete	Event	Opposition Result	Opposition Result	Opposition Result	Rank	Opposition Result	Opposition Result	Opposition Result	Opposition Result	Rank
Alexandre Ank	Men's singles C4-5	Bolldén (SWE); L 0–3	Lin W H (TPE); L 0–3	—N/a	3	did not advance				
Iranildo Espindola	Men's singles C2	Boury (FRA); W 3–1	Ruep (AUT); L 1–3	Vella (ITA); W 3–2	2	did not advance				
Ivanildo Pessoa Freitas	Men's singles C4-5	Guo X (CHN); L 0–3	Stefanu (CZE); L 1–3	—N/a	3	did not advance				
Welder Knaf	Men's singles C3	Feng P (CHN); L 0–3	Dollmann (AUT); L 1–3	—N/a	3	did not advance				
Hemerson Kovalski	Men's singles C2	L Hansen (DEN); L 0–3	Revucky (SVK); L 0–3	Vilsmaier (GER); L 0–3	4	did not advance				
Carlo Franco Michell	Men's singles C6	Wetherill (GBR); L 0–3	Schmidt (GER); L 0–3	Kowalski (POL); L 1–3	4	did not advance				
Claudiomiro Segatto	Men's singles C4-5	Choi K S (KOR); L 0–3	Krizanec (CRO); W 3–0	—N/a	2	did not advance				
Luiz Algacir Silva	Men's singles C3	Unger (AUT); W 3–0	Rawson (GBR); L 1–3	—N/a	1 Q	Robinson (GBR); W 3–0	Merrien (FRA); W 3–0	Feng P (CHN); L 0–3	Piñas (ESP); L 0–3	4

==== Women ====
Athlete	Event	Preliminaries				Semifinals	Final / BM	
Athlete	Event	Opposition Result	Opposition Result	Opposition Result	Rank	Opposition Result	Opposition Result	Rank
Carollina Maldonado	Women's singles C9	Lei L (CHN); L 0–3	Kavas (TUR); L 0–3	Belavic (SLO); W 3–1	3	did not advance		
Maria Luíza Passos	Women's singles C5	Ren G (CHN); L 0–3	Lundback (SWE); L 0–3	Tsai (TPE); L 0–3	4	did not advance		
Jane Karla Rodrigues	Women's singles C8	Zhang X (CHN); L 0–3	Mairie (FRA); L 0–3	Bengtsson (SWE); L 0–3	4	did not advance		

==== Teams ====
Athlete	Event	Round of 16	Quarterfinals	Semifinals	Final / BM	
Athlete	Event	Opposition Result	Opposition Result	Opposition Result	Opposition Result	Rank
Iranildo Espindola; Hemerson Kovalski	Men's team C1-2	—N/a	Austria (AUT); L 1–3	did not advance		
Welder Knaf; Luiz Algacir Silva	Men's team C3	—N/a	Austria (AUT); W 3–0	China (CHN); W 3–2	France (FRA); L 1–3	2nd place, silver medalist(s)
Alexandre Ank; Ivanildo Pessoa Freitas; Claudiomiro Segatto	Men's team C4-5	Chinese Taipei (TPE); L 1–3	did not advance			
Carollina Maldonado; Jane Karla Rodrigues	Women's team C6-10	—N/a	France (FRA); L 0–3	did not advance		

=== Volleyball ===
The men's volleyball team didn't win any medals, they were 6th out of 8 teams.

==== Players ====
- Wellington Anunciação
- Samuel Arantes
- Giovani Freitas
- Guilherme Gomes
- Renato Leite
- Rodrigo Mello
- Wescley Oliveira
- Diogo Rebolcas
- Deivisson Santos
- Cláudio Silva
- Daniel Silva
- Gilberto Silva

==== Tournament ====
7 September 2008; 19:30	Brazil (BRA)	0–3	Egypt (EGY)	China Agricultural University Gymnasium; Attendance: 1,000; Referees: Anton Probst (Germany)
7 September 2008; 19:30	(8–25, 14–25, 17–25)			China Agricultural University Gymnasium; Attendance: 1,000; Referees: Anton Probst (Germany)

8 September 2008; 15:30	Iran (IRI)	3–0	Brazil (BRA)	China Agricultural University Gymnasium; Attendance: 1,000; Referees: Viktor Feldshteyn (Ukraine)
8 September 2008; 15:30	(25–9, 25–11, 25–8)			China Agricultural University Gymnasium; Attendance: 1,000; Referees: Viktor Feldshteyn (Ukraine)

9 September 2008; 19:30	Brazil (BRA)	3-0	Japan (JPN)	China Agricultural University Gymnasium; Attendance: 1,000; Referees: An Qi (China)
9 September 2008; 19:30	(25–20, 25–17, 25–10)			China Agricultural University Gymnasium; Attendance: 1,000; Referees: An Qi (China)

5th-8th Classification Semifinals

{{{date}}}	Iraq (IRQ)	1–3	Brazil (BRA)	China Agricultural University Gymnasium
{{{date}}}	(13–25, 25–20, 16–25, 18–25)			China Agricultural University Gymnasium

5th/6th Classification

{{{date}}}	Brazil (BRA)	1–3	China (CHN)	China Agricultural University Gymnasium
{{{date}}}	(18–25, 25–23, 18–25, 19–25)			China Agricultural University Gymnasium

=== Wheelchair basketball ===
==== Men's tournament ====
The men's team didn't win any medals; they were 9th out of 12 teams.

Players

- Sérgio Alexandre
- Everaldo Lima
- Leandro Mirando
- Irio Nunes
- Nilton Pessoa
- Heriberto Rocha
- Douglas Silva
- Erick Silva
- José Marcos Silva
- José Ricardo Silva
- Gelson Silva Jr
- Francisco Silva Sandoval

Results

7 September 2008
13:30

Australia	73–72	Brazil

National Indoor Stadium, Beijing

8 September 2008
10:00

Brazil	41–87	United States

National Indoor Stadium, Beijing

9 September 2008
9:00

Israel	73–60	Brazil

National Indoor Stadium, Beijing

10 September 2008
20:45

Brazil	53–69	Great Britain

National Indoor Stadium, Beijing

11 September 2008
18:30

China	46–65	Brazil

National Indoor Stadium, Beijing

Classification round semifinals

12 September 2008
9:00

Brazil	75–56	Sweden
Scoring by quarter: 25 - 11, 16 - 12, 16 - 16, 18 - 17

National Indoor Stadium, Beijing
Attendance: 8854
Referees: Sebastien Gauthier (Canada)

Ninth place classification

16 September 2008
11:15

South Africa	46–68	Brazil
Scoring by quarter: 17 - 19, 11 - 18, 9 - 19, 9 - 12

National Indoor Stadium, Beijing
Attendance: 11204
Referees: Bill Kuerzi (United States)

==== Women's tournament ====
The women's team didn't win any medals; they were 10th out of 10 teams.

Players

- Vileide Almeida
- Mônica Andrade Santos
- Débora Costa
- Andreia Cristina Farias
- Helena Ferrão
- Elizabeth Gomes
- Naildes Mafra
- Jucilene Moraes
- Ozineide Pantoja
- Cleonete Reis
- Rosália Silva Ramos
- Lia Soares Martins

Results

7 September 2008
15:30

Germany	62–32	Brazil
Scoring by quarter: 17 - 6, 17 - 6, 16 - 8, 12 - 12

USTB Gymnasium, Beijing
Attendance: 2443
Referees: Edwin Frank Wallaart (Netherlands)

8 September 2008
13:30

Brazil	30–66	Australia

National Indoor Stadium, Beijing

9 September 2008
17:45

Great Britain	61–29	Brazil

Beijing Science and Technology University Gymnasium, Beijing

11 September 2008
9:00

Brazil	38–68	United States
Scoring by quarter: 6 - 20, 13 - 18, 9 - 13, 10 - 17

National Indoor Stadium, Beijing
Attendance: 7684
Referees: Ziv Radomsky (Israel)

9-10th classification

14 September 2008
13:30

Mexico	54–44	Brazil
Scoring by quarter: 16 - 12, 8 - 11, 18 - 12, 12 - 9

National Indoor Stadium, Beijing
Attendance: 12000
Referees: Seppo Olavi Viljanen (Czech Republic)

=== Wheelchair tennis ===
==== Men ====
Athlete	Class	Event	Round of 64	Round of 32	Round of 16	Quarterfinals	Semifinals	Finals
Athlete	Class	Event	Opposition Result	Opposition Result	Opposition Result	Opposition Result	Opposition Result	Opposition Result
Maurício Pommê	Open	Men's singles	Hinson (USA); L 1–6, 3–6	did not advance				
Carlos Santos	Open	Men's singles	Mossier (AUT); W 7–6, 7–5	Saida (JPN); L 0–6, 1–6	did not advance			
Maurício Pommê; Carlos Santos	Open	Men's doubles	—N/a	Fujimoto (JPN) / Ikenoya (JPN); L 2–6, 7–5, 1–6	did not advance			

== See also ==
- 2008 Summer Paralympics
- Brazil at the Paralympics
- Brazil at the 2008 Summer Olympics
