= Swimming at the 2008 Summer Paralympics – Men's 4 × 50 metre freestyle relay – 20 points =

Men's 4x50m Freestyle Relay 20 points at the XIII Paralympic Games
- Venue: Beijing National Aquatics Center
- Dates: 11 September
- Competitors: 7
- Winning time: 2:18.15

Medalists
1st place, gold medalist(s)		China (CHN); Du Jianping, Tang Yuan, He Junquan, Yang Yuanrun
2nd place, silver medalist(s)		Spain (ESP); Richard Oribe, Daniel Vidal, Jordi Gordillo, Sebastián Rodríguez
3rd place, bronze medalist(s)		Brazil (BRA); Clodoaldo Silva, Joon Seo, Daniel Dias, Adriano Lima

The men's 4x50m freestyle relay 20 points event at the 2008 Summer Paralympics took place at the Beijing National Aquatics Center on 11 September. There were no heats in this event.

== Results ==
=== Final ===
Competed at 19:55.

Rank	Lane	Nation	Swimmers	Time	Notes
1st place, gold medalist(s)	3	China	Du Jianping; Tang Yuan; He Junquan; Yang Yuanrun	2:18.15	WR
2nd place, silver medalist(s)	4	Spain	Richard Oribe; Daniel Vidal; Jordi Gordillo; Sebastián Rodríguez	2:18.73	
3rd place, bronze medalist(s)	5	Brazil	Clodoaldo Silva; Joon Seo; Daniel Dias; Adriano Lima	2:30.17	
4	7	Greece	Ioannis Kostakis; Stylianos Tsakonas; Konstantinos Karaouzas; Nikolaos Tsotras	2:57.98	
5	1	Mexico	Pedro Rangel; Juan Reyes; Vidal Dominguez; Jose Castorena	3:02.50	
	6	Russia	Dmitry Kokarev; Evgeny Zimin; Artem Zakharov; Ivan Khmelnitskiy		DSQ
	2	United States	Lantz Lamback; Dave Denniston; Michael Demarco; Roy Perkins		DSQ

WR = World Record.
