= Swimming at the 2008 Summer Paralympics – Men's 50 metre freestyle S5 =

Men's 50m Freestyle S5 at the XIII Paralympic Games
- Venue: Beijing National Aquatics Center
- Dates: 15 September
- Competitors: 12 from 10 nations
- Winning time: 33.00

Medalists
1st place, gold medalist(s)		Dmytro Kryzhanovskyy	Ukraine
2nd place, silver medalist(s)		Daniel Dias	Brazil
3rd place, bronze medalist(s)		Sebastián Rodríguez	Spain

The men's 50m freestyle S5 event at the 2008 Summer Paralympics took place at the Beijing National Aquatics Center on 15 September. There were two heats; the swimmers with the eight fastest times advanced to the final.

== Results ==
=== Heats ===
Competed from 09:59.

==== Heat 1 ====
Rank	Name	Nationality	Time	Notes
1	Dmytro Kryzhanovskyy	Ukraine	33.85	Q
2	Roy Perkins	United States	34.67	Q
3	Clodoaldo Silva	Brazil	34.86	Q
4	Jordi Gordillo	Spain	36.70	Q
5	Cameron Leslie	New Zealand	38.67	
6	Farhod Sayidov	Uzbekistan	1:07.53	

==== Heat 2 ====
Rank	Name	Nationality	Time	Notes
1	He Junquan	China	34.89	Q
2	Daniel Dias	Brazil	34.95	Q
3	Sebastián Rodríguez	Spain	35.46	Q
4	Anthony Stephens	Great Britain	35.82	Q
5	Takayuki Suzuki	Japan	39.35	
6	Zsolt Vereczkei	Hungary	40.82	

=== Final ===
Competed at 18:43.

Rank	Name	Nationality	Time	Notes
1st place, gold medalist(s)	Dmytro Kryzhanovskyy	Ukraine	33.00	
2nd place, silver medalist(s)	Daniel Dias	Brazil	33.56	
3rd place, bronze medalist(s)	Sebastián Rodríguez	Spain	33.78	
4	Roy Perkins	United States	34.61	
5	He Junquan	China	34.65	
6	Anthony Stephens	Great Britain	34.97	
7	Clodoaldo Silva	Brazil	35.22	
8	Jordi Gordillo	Spain	36.88	

Q = qualified for final.
