= Swimming at the 2012 Summer Paralympics – Men's 50 metre backstroke S5 =

Event at the 2012 Summer Paralympics

Men's 50 metre backstroke S5 at the XIV Paralympic Games
- Venue: London Aquatics Centre
- Dates: 6 September 2012
- Competitors: 18 from 14 nations

Medalists
1st place, gold medalist(s)		Daniel Dias	Brazil
2nd place, silver medalist(s)		He Junquan	China
3rd place, bronze medalist(s)		Zsolt Vereczkei	Hungary

The men's 50 metre backstroke S5 event at the 2012 Paralympic Games took place on 6 September, at the London Aquatics Centre.

Three heats were held, each with six swimmers. The swimmers with the eight fastest times advanced to the final.

== Heats ==
=== Heat 1 ===
Rank	Lane	Name	Nationality	Time	Notes
1	4	Zsolt Vereczkei	Hungary	38.86	Q
2	2	Jonas Larsen	Denmark	42.56	Q
3	5	Anthony Stephens	Great Britain	43.60	
4	3	Francisco Avelino	Brazil	44.89	
5	6	Roy Perkins	United States	47.37	
6	7	Matija Grebenic	Croatia	49.36	

=== Heat 2 ===
Rank	Lane	Name	Nationality	Time	Notes
1	4	He Junquan	China	37.02	Q
2	2	Vo Thanh Tung	Vietnam	42.26	Q
3	5	Zul Amirul Sidi Bin Abdullah	Malaysia	43.00	Q
4	6	Ricardo Ten	Spain	43.07	
5	3	James Scully	Ireland	45.27	
6	7	Miguel Luque	Spain	49.36	

=== Heat 3 ===
Rank	Lane	Name	Nationality	Time	Notes
1	4	Daniel Dias	Brazil	36.29	Q
2	5	Andrew Mullen	Great Britain	39.69	Q
3	3	Cameron Leslie	New Zealand	42.88	Q, OC
4	6	Beytullah Eroglu	Turkey	43.11	
5	7	Ariel Quassi	Argentina	49.45	
	2	Jamery Siga	Malaysia	DSQ	

== Final ==
Rank	Lane	Name	Nationality	Time	Notes
1st place, gold medalist(s)	4	Daniel Dias	Brazil	34.99	WR
2nd place, silver medalist(s)	5	He Junquan	China	36.41	
3rd place, bronze medalist(s)	3	Zsolt Vereczkei	Hungary	38.92	
4	6	Andrew Mullen	Great Britain	39.54	
5	1	Cameron Leslie	New Zealand	42.40	OC
6	2	Vo Thanh Tung	Vietnam	42.59	
7	7	Jonas Larsen	Denmark	42.93	
8	8	Zul Amirul Sidi Bin Abdullah	Malaysia	43.21	
