= Swimming at the 2008 Summer Paralympics – Men's 50 metre freestyle S6 =

Men's 50m Freestyle S6 at the XIII Paralympic Games
- Venue: Beijing National Aquatics Center
- Dates: 15 September
- Competitors: 15 from 10 nations
- Winning time: 29.78

Medalists
1st place, gold medalist(s)		Xu Qing	China
2nd place, silver medalist(s)		Tang Yuan	China
3rd place, bronze medalist(s)		Anders Olsson	Sweden

The men's 50m freestyle S6 event at the 2008 Summer Paralympics took place at the Beijing National Aquatics Center on 15 September. There were two heats; the swimmers with the eight fastest times advanced to the final.

== Results ==
=== Heats ===
Competed from 10:10.

==== Heat 1 ====
Rank	Name	Nationality	Time	Notes
1	Yang Yuanrun	China	31.16	Q
2	Anders Olsson	Sweden	31.48	Q
3	Sebastian Iwanow	Germany	32.72	Q
4	Kyosuke Oyama	Japan	32.87	Q
5	Adriano Lima	Brazil	32.98	Q
6	Matt Whorwood	Great Britain	34.94	
7	Yusup Dewa	Malaysia	35.24	

==== Heat 2 ====
Rank	Name	Nationality	Time	Notes
1	Tang Yuan	China	30.56	Q, PR
2	Xu Qing	China	30.86	Q
3	Daniel Vidal	Spain	32.06	Q
4	Sascha Kindred	Great Britain	33.04	
5	Andreas Potamitis	Cyprus	34.07	
6	Stian Helgeland	Norway	35.07	
7	Luis Silva	Brazil	35.67	
8	Danielson Santos	Brazil	37.13	

=== Final ===
Competed at 19:09.

Rank	Name	Nationality	Time	Notes
1st place, gold medalist(s)	Xu Qing	China	29.78	WR
2nd place, silver medalist(s)	Tang Yuan	China	30.07	
3rd place, bronze medalist(s)	Anders Olsson	Sweden	31.07	
4	Daniel Vidal	Spain	31.27	
5	Kyosuke Oyama	Japan	31.37	
6	Yang Yuanrun	China	31.66	
7	Sebastian Iwanow	Germany	32.79	
8	Adriano Lima	Brazil	32.85	

Q = qualified for final. WR = World Record. PR = Paralympic Record.
