= Swimming at the 2000 Summer Paralympics – Men's 200 metre individual medley SM5 =

Sports event

Men's 200m individual medley SM5 at the XI Paralympic Games
- Paralympic Swimming
- Venue: Sydney International Aquatics Centre
- Dates: 20 October 2000

Medalists
1st place, gold medalist(s)		Pablo Cimadevila	Spain
2nd place, silver medalist(s)		Pascal Pinard	France
3rd place, bronze medalist(s)		Arkadiusz Pawlowski	Poland

The men's 200 metre individual medley SM5 event took place on 20 October 2000 in Sydney, Australia.

== Results ==
=== Heat 1 ===
Rank	Athlete	Time	Notes
1	Ervin Kovacs (HUN)	3:14.45	Q
2	Arkadiusz Pawlowski (POL)	3:14.59	Q
3	Ivanildo Vasconcelos (BRA)	3:31.18	Q
4	Ariel Quassi (ARG)	3:52.77	Q
5	Vravit Kawkham (THA)	3:54.22	
	Moisés Fuentes (COL)		DQ

=== Heat 2 ===
Rank	Athlete	Time	Notes
1	Pablo Cimadevila (ESP)	3:08.35	Q, WR
2	Pascal Pinard (FRA)	3:22.33	Q
3	Essam Zeidan (EGY)	3:51.11	Q
4	Ricardo Ten (ESP)	3:54.00	Q
5	Zsolt Vereczkei (HUN)	4:19.99	
	He Junquan (CHN)		DQ

=== Final ===
Rank	Athlete	Time	Notes
1st place, gold medalist(s)	Pablo Cimadevila (ESP)	3:08.39	
2nd place, silver medalist(s)	Pascal Pinard (FRA)	3:13.30	
3rd place, bronze medalist(s)	Arkadiusz Pawlowski (POL)	3:15.99	
4	Ervin Kovacs (HUN)	3:17.23	
5	Ivanildo Vasconcelos (BRA)	3:33.08	
6	Ariel Quassi (ARG)	3:49.63	
7	Essam Zeidan (EGY)	4:00.42	
	Ricardo Ten (ESP)		DQ
