= Swimming at the 2008 Summer Paralympics – Men's 50 metre backstroke S5 =

Men's 50m Backstroke S5 at the XIII Paralympic Games
- Venue: Beijing National Aquatics Center
- Dates: 8 September
- Competitors: 14 from 8 nations
- Winning time: 35.28

Medalists
1st place, gold medalist(s)		Daniel Dias	Brazil
2nd place, silver medalist(s)		He Junquan	China
3rd place, bronze medalist(s)		Zsolt Vereczkei	Hungary

The men's 50m backstroke S5 event at the 2008 Summer Paralympics took place at the Beijing National Aquatics Center on 8 September. There were two heats; the swimmers with the eight fastest times advanced to the final.

== Results ==
=== Heats ===
Competed from 10:07.

==== Heat 1 ====
Rank	Name	Nationality	Time	Notes
1	Daniel Dias	Brazil	36.46	Q, WR
2	Zsolt Vereczkei	Hungary	40.50	Q
3	Anthony Stephens	Great Britain	43.24	Q
4	Vicente Javier Torres	Spain	47.49	
5	Clodoaldo Silva	Brazil	48.16	
6	Roy Perkins	United States	50.77	
7	Dave Denniston	United States	53.07	

==== Heat 2 ====
Rank	Name	Nationality	Time	Notes
1	He Junquan	China	35.04	Q, WR
2	Ervin Kovacs	Hungary	39.82	Q
3	Zul Amirul Sidi Abdullah	Malaysia	42.74	Q
4	Ricardo Ten	Spain	46.90	Q
5	Francisco Avelino	Brazil	47.29	Q
6	Miguel Luque	Spain	48.21	
7	Ariel Quassi	Argentina	49.73	

=== Final ===
Competed at 18:41.

Rank	Name	Nationality	Time	Notes
1st place, gold medalist(s)	Daniel Dias	Brazil	35.28	
2nd place, silver medalist(s)	He Junquan	China	35.43	
3rd place, bronze medalist(s)	Zsolt Vereczkei	Hungary	38.78	
4	Ervin Kovacs	Hungary	40.61	
5	Zul Amirul Sidi Abdullah	Malaysia	42.94	
6	Ricardo Ten	Spain	45.28	
7	Francisco Avelino	Brazil	47.28	
	Anthony Stephens	Great Britain		DQ

Q = qualified for final. WR = World Record.
