= Swimming at the 2012 Summer Paralympics – Men's 50 metre butterfly S5 =

Paralympic swimming event

Men's 50 metre butterfly S5 at the XIV Paralympic Games
- Venue: London Aquatics Centre
- Dates: 7 September 2012
- Competitors: 21 from 17 nations

Medalists
1st place, gold medalist(s)		Daniel Dias	Brazil
2nd place, silver medalist(s)		Roy Perkins	United States
3rd place, bronze medalist(s)		Junquan He	China

The men's 50 metre butterfly S5 event at the 2012 Paralympic Games took place on 7 September, at the London Aquatics Centre.

Three heats were held, each with seven swimmers. The swimmers with the eight fastest times advanced to the final.

== Heats ==
=== Heat 1 ===
Rank	Lane	Name	Nationality	Time	Notes
1	4	Junquan He	China	37.26	Q
2	2	Darko Đurić	Slovenia	40.99	Q, WR
3	3	Ricardo Ten	Spain	43.29	Q
4	5	Voravit Kaewkham	Thailand	45.04	
5	7	Aleksei Lyzhikhin	Russia	51.30	
6	1	Ariel Quassi	Argentina	55.19	
	6	Anthony Stephens	Great Britain	DNS	

=== Heat 2 ===
Rank	Lane	Name	Nationality	Time	Notes
1	4	Roy Perkins	United States	34.53	Q, PR
2	5	Andrew Mullen	Great Britain	39.71	Q
3	3	Arnost Petracek	Czech Republic	42.08	Q
4	6	Antonios Tsapatakis	Greece	44.47	
5	2	Clodoaldo Silva	Brazil	47.19	
6	7	Nicolo Bensi	Italy	49.06	
7	1	Matija Grebenic	Croatia	52.12	

=== Heat 3 ===
Rank	Lane	Name	Nationality	Time	Notes
1	4	Daniel Dias	Brazil	35.72	Q
2	3	Beytullah Eroglu	Turkey	42.27	Q
3	6	Efrem Morelli	Italy	43.71	
4	5	Thanh Tung Vo	Vietnam	43.82	
5	7	Takayuki Suzuki	Japan	48.10	
6	2	Jamery Siga	Malaysia	51.54	
7	1	Miguel Luque	Spain	54.88	

== Final ==
Rank	Lane	Name	Nationality	Time	Notes
1st place, gold medalist(s)	5	Daniel Dias	Brazil	34.15	WR
2nd place, silver medalist(s)	4	Roy Perkins	United States	34.57	
3rd place, bronze medalist(s)	3	Junquan He	China	37.20	
4	6	Andrew Mullen	Great Britain	40.04	
5	2	Darko Duric	Slovenia	40.48	WR
6	7	Arnost Petracek	Czech Republic	41.23	
7	1	Beytullah Eroglu	Turkey	41.44	
8	8	Ricardo Ten	Spain	43.65	
