= Swimming at the 2004 Summer Paralympics – Men's 50 metre backstroke S5 =

Men's 50m Backstroke S5 at the XII Paralympic Games
- Paralympic Swimming
- Venue: Olympic Aquatic Centre
- Dates: 20 September 2004
- Competitors: 9 from 8 nations
- Winning time: 37.53

Medalists
1st place, gold medalist(s)		He Junquan	China
2nd place, silver medalist(s)		Ervin Kovacs	Hungary
3rd place, bronze medalist(s)		Zsolt Vereczkei	Hungary

The Men's 50 metre backstroke S5 swimming event at the 2004 Summer Paralympics was competed on 20 September. It was won by He Junquan, representing China.

== 1st round ==
Qualified for final round

Heat 1

20 Sept. 2004, morning session

Rank	Athlete	Time	Notes
1	Ervin Kovacs (HUN)	39.74	
2	Krzyzstof Sleczka (POL)	43.05	
3	Anthony Stephens (GBR)	43.60	
4	Zul Amirul Sidi Abdullah (MAS)	44.47	

Heat 2

20 Sept. 2004, morning session

Rank	Athlete	Time	Notes
1	He Junquan (CHN)	36.75	WR
2	Zsolt Vereczkei (HUN)	40.86	
3	Pascal Pinard (FRA)	43.13	
4	Francisco Avelino (BRA)	43.65	
5	Sebastian Facundo Ramirez (ARG)	49.31	

== Final round ==
20 Sept. 2004, evening session

Rank	Athlete	Time	Notes
1st place, gold medalist(s)	He Junquan (CHN)	37.53	
2nd place, silver medalist(s)	Ervin Kovacs (HUN)	40.14	
3rd place, bronze medalist(s)	Zsolt Vereczkei (HUN)	40.49	
4	Pascal Pinard (FRA)	42.67	
5	Krzyzstof Sleczka (POL)	42.78	
6	Francisco Avelino (BRA)	43.13	
7	Anthony Stephens (GBR)	43.45	
8	Zul Amirul Sidi Abdullah (MAS)	43.50	
