= Swimming at the 2008 Summer Paralympics – Men's 200 metre freestyle S5 =

Men's 200m Freestyle S5 at the XIII Paralympic Games
- Venue: Beijing National Aquatics Center
- Dates: 9 September
- Competitors: 8 from 6 nations
- Winning time: 2:32.32

Medalists
1st place, gold medalist(s)		Daniel Dias	Brazil
2nd place, silver medalist(s)		Sebastián Rodríguez	Spain
3rd place, bronze medalist(s)		Anthony Stephens	Great Britain

The men's 200m freestyle S5 event at the 2008 Summer Paralympics took place at the Beijing National Aquatics Center on 9 September. There were no heats in this event.

== Final ==
Competed at 19:04.

Rank	Name	Nationality	Time	Notes
1st place, gold medalist(s)	Daniel Dias	Brazil	2:32.32	WR
2nd place, silver medalist(s)	Sebastián Rodríguez	Spain	2:38.88	
3rd place, bronze medalist(s)	Anthony Stephens	Great Britain	2:44.67	
4	Roy Perkins	United States	2:46.68	
5	Clodoaldo Silva	Brazil	2:50.89	
6	Cameron Leslie	New Zealand	2:57.21	
7	Jordi Gordillo	Spain	3:02.30	
8	Takayuki Suzuki	Japan	3:02.80	

WR = World Record.
