= Swimming at the 2008 Summer Paralympics – Men's 200 metre individual medley SM5 =

Men's 200m Individual Medley SM5 at the XIII Paralympic Games
- Venue: Beijing National Aquatics Center
- Dates: 11 September
- Competitors: 8 from 7 nations
- Winning time: 2:52.60

Medalists
1st place, gold medalist(s)		Daniel Dias	Brazil
2nd place, silver medalist(s)		He Junquan	China
3rd place, bronze medalist(s)		Pablo Cimadevila	Spain

The men's 200m individual medley SM5 event at the 2008 Summer Paralympics took place at the Beijing National Aquatics Center on 11 September. There were two heats; the swimmers with the eight fastest times advanced to the final (although apparently there were only eight entrants so no-one was eliminated).

== Results ==
=== Heats ===
Competed from 09:39.

==== Heat 1 ====
Rank	Name	Nationality	Time	Notes
1	He Junquan	China	3:05.15	Q
2	Ervin Kovacs	Hungary	3:14.70	Q
3	Ivanildo Vasconcelos	Brazil	3:42.56	Q
4	Vidal Dominguez	Mexico	3:45.96	Q

==== Heat 2 ====
Rank	Name	Nationality	Time	Notes
1	Daniel Dias	Brazil	2:59.04	Q, PR
2	Pablo Cimadevila	Spain	3:06.41	Q
3	Roy Perkins	United States	3:30.69	Q
4	Ariel Quassi	Argentina	3:47.46	Q

=== Final ===
Competed at 17:24.

Rank	Name	Nationality	Time	Notes
1st place, gold medalist(s)	Daniel Dias	Brazil	2:52.60	WR
2nd place, silver medalist(s)	He Junquan	China	3:00.92	
3rd place, bronze medalist(s)	Pablo Cimadevila	Spain	3:01.58	
4	Ervin Kovacs	Hungary	3:12.02	
5	Roy Perkins	United States	3:23.63	
6	Ivanildo Vasconcelos	Brazil	3:30.58	
7	Ariel Quassi	Argentina	3:42.93	
8	Vidal Dominguez	Mexico	3:50.11	

Q = qualified for final. WR = World Record. PR = Paralympic Record.
