= Swimming at the 2008 Summer Paralympics – Men's 50 metre butterfly S5 =

Men's 50m Butterfly S5 at the XIII Paralympic Games
- Venue: Beijing National Aquatics Center
- Dates: 10 September
- Competitors: 13 from 9 nations
- Winning time: 35.95

Medalists
| 1st place, gold medalist(s) | | Roy Perkins | United States |
| 2nd place, silver medalist(s) | | Daniel Dias | Brazil |
| 3rd place, bronze medalist(s) | | He Junquan | China |

The men's 50m butterfly S5 event at the 2008 Summer Paralympics took place at the Beijing National Aquatics Center on 10 September. There were two heats; the swimmers with the eight fastest times advanced to the final.

== Results ==
=== Heats ===
Competed from 10:13.

==== Heat 1 ====
| Rank | Name | Nationality | Time | Notes |
|---|---|---|---|---|
| 1 | Daniel Dias | Brazil | 38.79 | Q |
| 2 | Ervin Kovacs | Hungary | 39.97 | Q |
| 3 | Cameron Leslie | New Zealand | 43.20 | Q |
| 4 | Clodoaldo Silva | Brazil | 44.75 | Q |
| 5 | Juan Reyes | Mexico | 46.00 | |
| 6 | Ricardo Ten | Spain | 46.24 | |

==== Heat 2 ====
| Rank | Name | Nationality | Time | Notes |
|---|---|---|---|---|
| 1 | Roy Perkins | United States | 37.14 | Q, PR |
| 2 | He Junquan | China | 37.41 | Q |
| 3 | Voravit Kaewkham | Thailand | 42.75 | Q |
| 4 | Vidal Dominguez | Mexico | 45.32 | Q |
| 5 | Dave Denniston | United States | 45.89 | |
| 6 | Somchai Duangkeaw | Thailand | 50.43 | |
| | Filippo Bonacini | Italy | | DQ |

=== Final ===
Competed at 19:02.

| Rank | Name | Nationality | Time | Notes |
|---|---|---|---|---|
| 1st place, gold medalist(s) | Roy Perkins | United States | 35.95 | WR |
| 2nd place, silver medalist(s) | Daniel Dias | Brazil | 36.25 | |
| 3rd place, bronze medalist(s) | He Junquan | China | 37.07 | |
| 4 | Ervin Kovacs | Hungary | 39.33 | |
| 5 | Voravit Kaewkham | Thailand | 40.78 | |
| 6 | Cameron Leslie | New Zealand | 44.43 | |
| 7 | Vidal Dominguez | Mexico | 45.50 | |
| 8 | Clodoaldo Silva | Brazil | 45.74 | |

Q = qualified for final. WR = World Record. PR = Paralympic Record. DQ = Disqualified.
