= Swimming at the 2004 Summer Paralympics – Men's 100 metre breaststroke SB4 =

Men's 100m Breaststroke SB4 at the XII Paralympic Games
- Paralympic Swimming
- Venue: Olympic Aquatic Centre
- Dates: 24 September 2004
- Competitors: 10 from 7 nations
- Winning time: 1:40.22

Medalists
1st place, gold medalist(s)		Pascal Pinard	France
2nd place, silver medalist(s)		Ivanildo Vasconcelos	Brazil
3rd place, bronze medalist(s)		Francisco Avelino	Brazil

The Men's 100 metre breaststroke SB4 swimming event at the 2004 Summer Paralympics was competed on 24 September. It was won by Pascal Pinard, representing France.

== 1st round ==
Qualified for next round

Heat 1

24 Sept. 2004, morning session

Rank	Athlete	Time	Notes
1	Ivanildo Vasconcelos (BRA)	1:48.01	
2	Moisés Fuentes (COL)	1:50.83	
3	Pablo Cimadevilla (ESP)	1:53.26	
4	Vidal Dominguez (MEX)	2:00.86	
5	Sebastian Facundo Ramirez (ARG)	2:07.46	

Heat 2

24 Sept. 2004, morning session

Rank	Athlete	Time	Notes
1	Pascal Pinard (FRA)	1:43.25	
2	Francisco Avelino (BRA)	1:51.90	
3	Back Min Jun (KOR)	1:58.92	
4	Marcelo Ariel Quassi (ARG)	2:00.53	
5	Park Jong Man (KOR)	2:01.82	

== Final round ==
24 Sept. 2004, evening session

Rank	Athlete	Time	Notes
1st place, gold medalist(s)	Pascal Pinard (FRA)	1:40.22	
2nd place, silver medalist(s)	Ivanildo Vasconcelos (BRA)	1:48.33	
3rd place, bronze medalist(s)	Francisco Avelino (BRA)	1:49.37	
4	Pablo Cimadevilla (ESP)	1:51.20	
5	Moisés Fuentes (COL)	1:56.46	
6	Marcelo Ariel Quassi (ARG)	1:59.40	
7	Back Min Jun (KOR)	1:59.73	
8	Vidal Dominguez (MEX)	2:02.75	
