= Swimming at the 2008 Summer Paralympics – Men's 50 metre backstroke S2 =

Men's 50m Backstroke S2 at the XIII Paralympic Games
- Venue: Beijing National Aquatics Center
- Dates: 15 September
- Competitors: 9 from 8 nations
- Winning time: 1:03.17

Medalists
1st place, gold medalist(s)		Dmitry Kokarev	Russia
2nd place, silver medalist(s)		Jim Anderson	Great Britain
3rd place, bronze medalist(s)		Georgios Kapellakis	Greece

The men's 50m backstroke S2 event at the 2008 Summer Paralympics took place at the Beijing National Aquatics Center on 15 September. There were two heats; the swimmers with the eight fastest times advanced to the final.

== Results ==
=== Heats ===
Competed from 09:26.

==== Heat 1 ====
Rank	Name	Nationality	Time	Notes
1	Dmitry Kokarev	Russia	1:06.21	Q
2	Gabriel Feiten	Brazil	1:12.27	Q
3	Adriano Pereira	Brazil	1:13.50	Q
4	Curtis Lovejoy	United States	1:16.03	Q

==== Heat 2 ====
Rank	Name	Nationality	Time	Notes
1	Jim Anderson	Great Britain	1:05.56	Q
2	Georgios Kapellakis	Greece	1:09.58	Q
3	Iyad Shalabi	Israel	1:13.28	Q
4	Denys Zhumela	Ukraine	1:14.85	Q
5	Christian Goldbach	Germany	1:22.63	

=== Final ===
Competed at 17:06.

Rank	Name	Nationality	Time	Notes
1st place, gold medalist(s)	Dmitry Kokarev	Russia	1:03.17	WR
2nd place, silver medalist(s)	Jim Anderson	Great Britain	1:04.33	
3rd place, bronze medalist(s)	Georgios Kapellakis	Greece	1:07.31	
4	Iyad Shalabi	Israel	1:10.88	
5	Adriano Pereira	Brazil	1:13.69	
6	Curtis Lovejoy	United States	1:14.69	
7	Denys Zhumela	Ukraine	1:15.40	
8	Gabriel Feiten	Brazil	1:15.77	

Q = qualified for final. WR = World Record.
