= Swimming at the 2008 Summer Paralympics – Men's 50 metre freestyle S2 =

Men's 50 metre freestyle S2 at the XIII Paralympic Games
- Venue: Beijing National Aquatics Center
- Dates: September 13
- Competitors: 10 from 8 nations

Medalists
1st place, gold medalist(s)		Georgios Kapellakis	Greece
2nd place, silver medalist(s)		Dmitry Kokarev	Russia
3rd place, bronze medalist(s)		Jim Anderson	Great Britain

The men's 50 metre freestyle S2 event at the 2008 Paralympic Games took place on September 13, at the Beijing National Aquatics Center.

Two heats were held, with five swimmers each. The swimmers with the eight fastest times advanced to the final; there, they all competed in a single final heat to earn final placements.

== Heats ==
=== Heat 1 ===
Rank	Lane	Name	Nationality	Time	Notes
1	4	Dmitry Kokarev	Russia	1:09.59	Q
2	5	Curtis Lovejoy	United States	1:14.22	Q
3	3	Adriano Pereira	Brazil	1:14.74	Q
4	6	Gabriel Feiten	Brazil	1:17.85	Q
5	2	Christos Tampaxis	Greece	1:20.84	

=== Heat 2 ===
Rank	Lane	Name	Nationality	Time	Notes
1	4	Jim Anderson	Great Britain	1:10.73	Q
2	5	Georgios Kapellakis	Greece	1:11.02	Q
3	3	Denys Zhumela	Ukraine	1:13.59	Q
4	6	Iyad Shalabi	Israel	1:14.55	Q
5	2	Christian Goldbach	Germany	1:20.99	

== Final ==
Rank	Lane	Name	Nationality	Time	Notes
1	3	Georgios Kapellakis	Greece	1:04.85	
2	4	Dmitry Kokarev	Russia	1:05.15	
3	5	Jim Anderson	Great Britain	1:06.09	
4	7	Iyad Shalabi	Israel	1:10.51	
5	6	Denys Zhumela	Ukraine	1:12.04	
6	2	Curtis Lovejoy	United States	1:12.59	
7	8	Gabriel Feiten	Brazil	1:15.14	
8	1	Adriano Pereira	Brazil	1:15.41	
