= Swimming at the 2008 Summer Paralympics – Men's 100 metre freestyle S2 =

Men's 100m Freestyle S2 at the XIII Paralympic Games
- Venue: Beijing National Aquatics Center
- Dates: 9 September
- Competitors: 10 from 8 nations
- Winning time: 2:18.04

Medalists
1st place, gold medalist(s)		Dmitry Kokarev	Russia
2nd place, silver medalist(s)		Georgios Kapellakis	Greece
3rd place, bronze medalist(s)		Jim Anderson	Great Britain

The men's 100m freestyle S2 event at the 2008 Summer Paralympics took place at the Beijing National Aquatics Center on 9 September. There were two heats; the swimmers with the eight fastest times advanced to the final.

== Results ==
=== Heats ===
Competed from 09:00.

==== Heat 1 ====
Rank	Name	Nationality	Time	Notes
1	Jim Anderson	Great Britain	2:26.23	Q
2	Denys Zhumela	Ukraine	2:34.40	Q
3	Adriano Pereira	Brazil	2:36.14	Q
4	Christian Goldbach	Germany	2:47.56	
5	Christos Tampaxis	Greece	2:53.19	

==== Heat 2 ====
Rank	Name	Nationality	Time	Notes
1	Dmitry Kokarev	Russia	2:19.39	Q
2	Georgios Kapellakis	Greece	2:31.97	Q
3	Curtis Lovejoy	United States	2:35.48	Q
4	Gabriel Feiten	Brazil	2:35.83	Q
5	Iyad Shalabi	Israel	2:38.80	Q

=== Final ===
Competed at 17:00.

Rank	Name	Nationality	Time	Notes
1st place, gold medalist(s)	Dmitry Kokarev	Russia	2:18.04	
2nd place, silver medalist(s)	Georgios Kapellakis	Greece	2:23.63	
3rd place, bronze medalist(s)	Jim Anderson	Great Britain	2:24.32	
4	Adriano Pereira	Brazil	2:32.45	
5	Gabriel Feiten	Brazil	2:33.72	
6	Curtis Lovejoy	United States	2:34.11	
7	Denys Zhumela	Ukraine	2:35.90	
8	Iyad Shalabi	Israel	2:37.66	

Q = qualified for final.
