= Swimming at the 2008 Summer Paralympics – Men's 400 metre freestyle S10 =

Men's 400m Freestyle S10 at the XIII Paralympic Games
- Venue: Beijing National Aquatics Center
- Dates: 15 September
- Competitors: 12 from 10 nations
- Winning time: 4:05.84

Medalists
1st place, gold medalist(s)		André Brasil	Brazil
2nd place, silver medalist(s)		Robert Welbourn	Great Britain
3rd place, bronze medalist(s)		Benoît Huot	Canada

The men's 400m freestyle S10 event at the 2008 Summer Paralympics took place at the Beijing National Aquatics Center on 15 September. There were two heats; the swimmers with the eight fastest times advanced to the final.

== Results ==
=== Heats ===
Competed from 09:00.

==== Heat 1 ====
Rank	Name	Nationality	Time	Notes
1	Robert Welbourn	Great Britain	4:18.19	Q
2	Joe Wise	United States	4:18.37	Q
3	Lucas Ludwig	Germany	4:23.24	Q
4	Marcelo Collet	Brazil	4:23.93	Q
5	Kevin Paul	South Africa	4:27.57	Q
6	Filip Coufal	Czech Republic	4:33.13	

==== Heat 2 ====
Rank	Name	Nationality	Time	Notes
1	André Brasil	Brazil	4:23.48	Q
2	Benoît Huot	Canada	4:25.96	Q
3	Eduard Samarin	Russia	4:27.59	Q
4	Mike van der Zanden	Netherlands	4:28.40	
5	Phelipe Rodrigues	Brazil	4:29.36	
6	Yann Bourdier	France	4:33.32	

=== Final ===
Competed at 17:38.

Rank	Name	Nationality	Time	Notes
1st place, gold medalist(s)	André Brasil	Brazil	4:05.84	PR
2nd place, silver medalist(s)	Robert Welbourn	Great Britain	4:07.61	
3rd place, bronze medalist(s)	Benoît Huot	Canada	4:12.14	
4	Lucas Ludwig	Germany	4:13.64	
5	Joe Wise	United States	4:15.83	
6	Marcelo Collet	Brazil	4:23.35	
7	Kevin Paul	South Africa	4:27.68	
8	Eduard Samarin	Russia	4:28.25	

Q = qualified for final. PR = Paralympic Record.
