= Swimming at the 2012 Summer Paralympics – Men's 100 metre freestyle S6 =

Event at the 2012 Summer Paralympics

Men's 100m Freestyle S6 at the XIV Paralympic Games
- Venue: London Aquatics Centre
- Dates: 8 September 2012
- Competitors: 16 from 11 nations
- Winning time: 1:05.82

Medalists
1st place, gold medalist(s)		Xu Qing	China
2nd place, silver medalist(s)		Sebastian Iwanow	Germany
3rd place, bronze medalist(s)		Lorenzo Perez Escalona	Cuba

The men's 100m freestyle S6 event at the 2012 Summer Paralympics took place at the London Aquatics Centre on 8 September. There were two heats; the swimmers with the eight fastest times advanced to the final.

== Results ==
=== Heats ===
Competed from 09:49.

==== Heat 1 ====
Rank	Lane	Name	Nationality	Time	Notes
1	5	Lorenzo Perez Escalona	Cuba	1:10.64	Q
2	3	Matthew Haanappel	Australia	1:10.95	Q, OC
3	6	Matthew Whorwood	Great Britain	1:11.47	Q
4	4	Xu Qing	China	1:12.29	Q
5	2	Nelson Crispín	Colombia	1:13.68	
6	7	Swen Michaelis	Germany	1:14.44	
7	1	Daniel Londono	Colombia	1:14.55	
8	8	Yoav Valinsky	Israel	1:14.65	

==== Heat 2 ====
Rank	Lane	Name	Nationality	Time	Notes
1	4	Sebastian Iwanow	Germany	1:09.80	Q
2	2	Darragh McDonald	Ireland	1:10.59	Q
3	6	Adriano de Lima	Brazil	1:10.96	Q
4	5	Anders Olsson	Sweden	1:11.04	Q
5	3	Tang Yuan	China	1:12.76	
6	1	Aaron Rhind	Australia	1:14.48	
7	8	Reagan Wickens	Australia	1:17.15	
8	7	Kyosuke Oyama	Japan	1:19.16	

=== Final ===
Competed at 17:44.

Rank	Lane	Name	Nationality	Time	Notes
1st place, gold medalist(s)	8	Xu Qing	China	1:05.82	PR
2nd place, silver medalist(s)	4	Sebastian Iwanow	Germany	1:07.34	
3rd place, bronze medalist(s)	3	Lorenzo Perez Escalona	Cuba	1:08.01	AM
4	5	Darragh McDonald	Ireland	1:08.92	
5	6	Matthew Haanappel	Australia	1:09.88	OC
6	7	Anders Olsson	Sweden	1:10.12	
7	1	Matthew Whorwood	Great Britain	1:11.21	
8	2	Adriano de Lima	Brazil	1:11.32	

Q = qualified for final. PR = Paralympic Record. AM = Americas Record. OC = Oceania Record.
