= Swimming at the 2012 Summer Paralympics – Men's 200 metre individual medley SM6 =

Event at the 2012 Summer Paralympics

Men's 200 metre ind. medley – SM6 at the XIV Paralympic Games
- Venue: London Aquatics Centre
- Dates: 3 September 2012
- Competitors: 16 from 11 nations

Medalists
1st place, gold medalist(s)		Xu Qing	China
2nd place, silver medalist(s)		Sascha Kindred	Great Britain
3rd place, bronze medalist(s)		Tao Zheng	China

The men's 200 metre ind. medley SM6 event at the 2012 Paralympic Games took place on 3 September, at the London Aquatics Centre.

Two heats were held, eight swimmers swam in each. The swimmers with the eight fastest times advanced to the final.

== Heats ==
=== Heat 1 ===
Rank	Lane	Name	Nationality	Time	Notes
1	4	Xu Qing	China	2:45.62	Q
2	5	Iaroslav Semenenko	Ukraine	2:50.38	Q
3	3	Matthew Whorwood	Great Britain	2:53.82	Q
4	6	Swen Michaelis	Germany	2:57.39	Q
5	2	Nelson Crispín	Colombia	2:57.88	Q, AM
6	1	Reagan Wickens	Australia	3:11.87	OC
6	7	Daniel Londono	Colombia	3:11.87	
8	8	Jawad Kadhim Joudah Joudah	Iraq	3:25.70	

=== Heat 2 ===
Rank	Lane	Name	Nationality	Time	Notes
1	4	Sascha Kindred	Great Britain	2:44.29	Q
2	5	Tao Zheng	China	2:52.58	Q
3	6	Matthew Haanappel	Australia	2:57.27	Q, OC
4	2	Aaron Rhind	Australia	2:59.01	
5	3	Ce Liu	China	3:01.51	
6	7	Yoav Valinsky	Israel	3:03.88	
7	1	Adriano de Lima	Brazil	3:10.51	
8	8	Kyosuke Oyama	Japan	3:11.15	

== Final ==
Rank	Lane	Name	Nationality	Time	Notes
1st place, gold medalist(s)	5	Xu Qing	China	2:38.62	WR
2nd place, silver medalist(s)	4	Sascha Kindred	Great Britain	2:41.50	EU
3rd place, bronze medalist(s)	6	Tao Zheng	China	2:44.38	
4	3	Iaroslav Semenenko	Ukraine	2.48.11	
5	2	Matthew Whorwood	Great Britain	2.53.08	
6	8	Nelson Crispín	Colombia	2:55.52	AM
7	7	Matthew Haanappel	Australia	2.55.60	OC
8	1	Swen Michaels	Germany	2.58.50	
