= Swimming at the 2016 Summer Paralympics – Men's 50 metre butterfly S6 =

Men's 50 metre butterfly S6 at the XV Paralympic Games
- Venue: Olympic Aquatics Stadium
- Dates: 9 September 2016
- Competitors: 13 from 10 nations

Medalists
1st place, gold medalist(s)		Qing Xu	China
2nd place, silver medalist(s)		Zheng Tao	China
3rd place, bronze medalist(s)		Lichao Wang	China

The Men's 50 metre butterfly S6 event at the 2016 Paralympic Games took place on 9 September 2016, at the Olympic Aquatics Stadium. Two heats were held. The swimmers with the eight fastest times advanced to the final.

== Heats ==
=== Heat 1 ===
9:54 9 September 2016:

Rank	Lane	Name	Nationality	Time	Notes
1	4	Nelson Crispín	Colombia	31.27	Q
2	5	Sascha Kindred	Great Britain	32.76	Q
3	3	Talisson Glock	Brazil	33.74	Q
4	6	Nathan Clement	Canada	34.04	Q
5	2	Iaroslav Semenenko	Ukraine	34.38	
	7	Agus Ngaimin	Indonesia		DSQ

=== Heat 2 ===
9:57 9 September 2016:

Rank	Lane	Name	Nationality	Time	Notes
1	6	Lichao Wang	China	30.89	Q
2	4	Zheng Tao	China	31.25	Q
3	5	Qing Xu	China	31.74	Q
4	3	Kyosuke Oyama	Japan	33.06	Q
5	2	Raul Alberto Martinez Valdes	Mexico	34.38	
6	7	Panagiotis Christakis	Greece	35.46	
7	1	Oscar Osorio Campaz	Colombia	37.29	

== Final ==
18:11 9 September 2016:

Rank	Lane	Name	Nationality	Time	Notes
1st place, gold medalist(s)	6	Qing Xu	China	29.89	WR
2nd place, silver medalist(s)	5	Zheng Tao	China	29.93	
3rd place, bronze medalist(s)	4	Lichao Wang	China	30.95	
4	3	Nelson Crispín	Colombia	31.30	
5	7	Kyosuke Oyama	Japan	31.98	
6	2	Sascha Kindred	Great Britain	32.91	
7	8	Nathan Clement	Canada	33.13	
8	1	Talisson Glock	Brazil	33.14	
