= Swimming at the 2008 Summer Paralympics – Men's 100 metre freestyle S10 =

Men's 100m freestyle event

Men's 100m Freestyle S10 at the XIII Paralympic Games
- Venue: Beijing National Aquatics Center
- Dates: 9 September
- Competitors: 18 from 11 nations
- Winning time: 51.38

Medalists
1st place, gold medalist(s)		André Brasil	Brazil
2nd place, silver medalist(s)		Phelipe Rodrigues	Brazil
3rd place, bronze medalist(s)		Benoît Huot	Canada

The men's 100m freestyle S10 event at the 2008 Summer Paralympics took place at the Beijing National Aquatics Center on 9 September. There were three heats; the swimmers with the eight fastest times advanced to the final.

== Results ==
=== Heats ===
Competed from 09:26.

==== Heat 1 ====
Rank	Name	Nationality	Time	Notes
1	Robert Welbourn	Great Britain	54.57	Q
2	Phelipe Rodrigues	Brazil	55.07	Q
3	Roy Tobis	Germany	55.55	Q
4	Mike van der Zanden	Netherlands	56.20	
5	Filip Coufal	Czech Republic	56.91	
6	Denys Graniuk	Ukraine	59.34	

==== Heat 2 ====
Rank	Name	Nationality	Time	Notes
1	Benoît Huot	Canada	54.45	Q
2	David Julian Levecq	Spain	55.15	Q
3	Graham Edmunds	Great Britain	55.64	Q
4	Andrew Pasterfield	Australia	56.03	
5	Michael Anderson	Australia	56.08	
6	Maksym Isayev	Ukraine	58.39	

==== Heat 3 ====
Rank	Name	Nationality	Time	Notes
1	André Brasil	Brazil	54.27	Q
2	Justin Zook	United States	55.35	Q
3	Jeremy Tidy	Australia	55.72	
4	Lucas Ludwig	Germany	56.19	
5	Marcelo Collet	Brazil	57.96	
6	Eduard Samarin	Russia	58.63	

=== Final ===
Competed at 17:18.

Rank	Name	Nationality	Time	Notes
1st place, gold medalist(s)	André Brasil	Brazil	51.38	WR
2nd place, silver medalist(s)	Phelipe Rodrigues	Brazil	54.22	
3rd place, bronze medalist(s)	Benoît Huot	Canada	54.26	
4	Robert Welbourn	Great Britain	54.40	
5	David Julian Levecq	Spain	54.73	
6	Roy Tobis	Germany	55.07	
7	Graham Edmunds	Great Britain	55.63	
8	Justin Zook	United States	55.68	

Q = qualified for final. WR = World Record.
