= Athletics at the 2008 Summer Paralympics – Men's marathon T46 =

The Men's Marathon T46 had its Final held on September 17 at 7:30.

== Medalists ==
Gold	Mario Santillan; Mexico
Silver	Tito Sena; Brazil
Bronze	Walter Endrizzi; Italy

== Results ==
Place	Athlete	Final
1	Mario Santillan (MEX)	2:27:04 WR
2	Tito Sena (BRA)	2:30:49
3	Walter Endrizzi (ITA)	2:32.51
4	Guiming Han (CHN)	2:33.57
5	Ozivan Bonfim (BRA)	2:35:31
6	Samir Chaabani (TUN)	2:35:54
7	Frederic van den Heede (SUI)	2:37:03
8	Pedro Meza (MEX)	2:38:57
9	Moisés Neto (BRA)	2:41:32
10	Jose Antonio Castilla (ESP)	2:45:47
11	José Javier Conde (ESP)	2:45:48
12	Zeljko Celikovic (SRB)	2:56:53
13	Kemal Ozdemir (TUR)	3:11:12
	Mohamed Fouzai (TUN)	DNF

== See also ==
- Marathon at the Paralympics
