= Swimming at the 2008 Summer Paralympics – Men's 50 metre freestyle S10 =

Men's 50m Freestyle S10 at the XIII Paralympic Games
- Venue: Beijing National Aquatics Center
- Dates: 14 September
- Competitors: 15 from 10 nations
- Winning time: 23.61

Medalists
1st place, gold medalist(s)		André Brasil	Brazil
2nd place, silver medalist(s)		Phelipe Rodrigues	Brazil
3rd place, bronze medalist(s)		Benoît Huot	Canada

The men's 50m freestyle S10 event at the 2008 Summer Paralympics took place at the Beijing National Aquatics Center on 14 September. There were two heats; the swimmers with the eight fastest times advanced to the final.

== Results ==
=== Heats ===
Competed from 10:50.

==== Heat 1 ====
Rank	Name	Nationality	Time	Notes
1	Benoît Huot	Canada	24.84	Q
2	Graham Edmunds	Great Britain	25.10	Q
3	Michael Anderson	Australia	25.13	Q
4	Lucas Ludwig	Germany	25.79	
5	Alexander Shchelochkov	Russia	25.79	
6	Maksym Isayev	Ukraine	26.71	
7	Eduard Samarin	Russia	26.78	

==== Heat 2 ====
Rank	Name	Nationality	Time	Notes
1	André Brasil	Brazil	24.55	Q
2	Phelipe Rodrigues	Brazil	24.77	Q
3	Justin Zook	United States	24.92	Q
4	David Julian Levecq	Spain	25.20	Q
5	Roy Tobis	Germany	25.21	Q
6	Andrew Pasterfield	Australia	25.34	
7	Jeremy Tidy	Australia	25.83	
8	Dusan Dragovic	Montenegro	27.86	

=== Final ===
Competed at 20:25.

Rank	Name	Nationality	Time	Notes
1st place, gold medalist(s)	André Brasil	Brazil	23.61	WR
2nd place, silver medalist(s)	Phelipe Rodrigues	Brazil	24.64	
3rd place, bronze medalist(s)	Benoît Huot	Canada	24.65	
4	Justin Zook	United States	24.81	
5	David Julian Levecq	Spain	24.87	
6	Michael Anderson	Australia	25.04	
7	Roy Tobis	Germany	25.04	
8	Graham Edmunds	Great Britain	25.11	

Q = qualified for final. WR = World Record.
