= Boccia at the 2008 Summer Paralympics – Individual BC4 =

Individual BC4 at the XIII Paralympic Games
- Paralympic Boccia
- Venue: Olympic Green Convention Center
- Dates: 7–9 September 2008
- Competitors: 16 from 8 nations

Medalists
1st place, gold medalist(s)		Dirceu Pinto	Brazil
2nd place, silver medalist(s)		Leung Yuk Wing	Hong Kong
3rd place, bronze medalist(s)		Eliseu Santos	Brazil

The Boccia Individual BC4 event at the 2008 Summer Paralympics was held in the Olympic Green Convention Center on 7–9 September. The preliminary stages consisted of 4 round-robin groups of 4 competitors each. The top two players in each group qualified for the final stages. The event was won by Dirceu Pinto, representing Brazil.

== Results ==
=== Preliminaries ===
==== Pool A ====
Rank	Competitor	MP	W	L	Points	CHN	HKG	SVK	SVK
1	Ni Suili (CHN)	3	3	0	16:5	x	3:2	5:1	8:2
2	Leung Yuk Wing (HKG)	3	2	1	13:10	2:3	x	7:4	4:3*
3	Robert Durkovic (SVK)	3	1	2	9:15	1:5	4:7	x	4:3
4	Martin Streharsky (SVK)	3	0	3	8:16	2:8	3:4*	3:4	x

- after an extra (fifth) end

==== Pool B ====
Rank	Competitor	MP	W	L	Points	POR	BRA	POR	HUN
1	Fernando Pereira (POR)	3	2	1	14:9	x	4:7	5:2	5:0
2	Dirceu Pinto (BRA)	3	2	1	13:9	7:4	x	2:4	4:1
3	Bruno Valentim (POR)	3	2	1	13:9	2:5	4:2	x	7:2
4	Jozsef Gyurkota (HUN)	3	0	3	3:16	0:5	1:4	2:7	x

==== Pool C ====
Rank	Competitor	MP	W	L	Points	CHN	BRA	CZE	ESP
1	Qi Cuifang (CHN)	3	3	0	29:3	x	8:3	12:0	9:0
2	Eliseu Santos (BRA)	3	2	1	23:8	3:8	x	8:0	12:0
3	Radek Prochazka (CZE)	3	1	2	8:21	0:12	0:8	x	8:1
4	Maria Desamparados Baixauli (ESP)	3	0	3	1:29	0:9	0:12	1:8	x

==== Pool D ====
Rank	Competitor	MP	W	L	Points	HKG	ESP	HUN	CZE
1	Lau Wai Yan Vivian (HKG)	3	2	1	14:10	x	5:6	3:2	6:2
2	Jose Maria Dueso (ESP)	3	2	1	15:17	6:5	x	7:6	2:6
3	Dezso Beres (HUN)	3	1	2	17:11	2:3	6:7	x	9:1
4	Ladislav Kratina (CZE)	3	1	2	9:17	2:6	6:2	1:9	x

=== Competition bracket ===
Quarter-finals
Ni Suili (CHN)	0
Dirceu Pinto (BRA)	12
Lau Wai Yan Vivian (HKG)	3
Eliseu Santos (BRA)	7
Fernando Pereira (POR)	2
Leung Yuk Wing (HKG)	9
Qi Cuifang (CHN)	2
Jose Maria Dueso (ESP)	6

Semi-finals
Dirceu Pinto (BRA)	9
Eliseu Santos (BRA)	2
Leung Yuk Wing (HKG)	6
Jose Maria Dueso (ESP)	1

Final
Dirceu Pinto (BRA)	3
Leung Yuk Wing (HKG)	1
Third place
Eliseu Santos (BRA)	7
Jose Maria Dueso (ESP)	1
