= Swimming at the 2008 Summer Paralympics – Men's 200 metre individual medley SM10 =

Men's 200m Individual Medley SM10 at the XIII Paralympic Games
- Venue: Beijing National Aquatics Center
- Dates: 11 September
- Competitors: 14 from 11 nations
- Winning time: 2:12.78

Medalists
1st place, gold medalist(s)		Rick Pendleton	Australia
2nd place, silver medalist(s)		André Brasil	Brazil
3rd place, bronze medalist(s)		Benoît Huot	Canada

The men's 200m individual medley SM10 event at the 2008 Summer Paralympics took place at the Beijing National Aquatics Center on 11 September. There were two heats; the swimmers with the eight fastest times advanced to the final.

== Results ==
=== Heats ===
Competed from 10:31.

==== Heat 1 ====
Rank	Name	Nationality	Time	Notes
1	Rick Pendleton	Australia	2:18.76	Q
2	Jeremy Tidy	Australia	2:19.44	Q
3	Sven Decaesstecker	Belgium	2:19.57	Q
4	Mike van der Zanden	Netherlands	2:24.56	
5	Vincent Rupp	France	2:24.75	
6	Christoph Weber	Germany	2:28.49	
7	Eduard Samarin	Russia	2:30.93	

==== Heat 2 ====
Rank	Name	Nationality	Time	Notes
1	Benoît Huot	Canada	2:20.13	Q
2	Lucas Ludwig	Germany	2:20.37	Q
3	André Brasil	Brazil	2:20.40	Q
4	Robert Welbourn	Great Britain	2:21.25	Q
5	Filip Coufal	Czech Republic	2:21.56	Q
6	Kevin Paul	South Africa	2:22.15	
7	Daniel Bell	Australia	2:22.96	

=== Final ===
Competed at 19:25.

Rank	Name	Nationality	Time	Notes
1st place, gold medalist(s)	Rick Pendleton	Australia	2:12.78	WR
2nd place, silver medalist(s)	André Brasil	Brazil	2:14.20	
3rd place, bronze medalist(s)	Benoît Huot	Canada	2:15.22	
4	Sven Decaesstecker	Belgium	2:16.21	
5	Lucas Ludwig	Germany	2:18.93	
6	Jeremy Tidy	Australia	2:19.76	
7	Robert Welbourn	Great Britain	2:19.91	
8	Filip Coufal	Czech Republic	2:23.18	

Q = qualified for final. WR = World Record.
