= Boccia at the 2008 Summer Paralympics – Pairs BC4 =

Pairs BC4 at the XIII Paralympic Games
- Paralympic Boccia
- Venue: Olympic Green Convention Center
- Dates: 10–12 September 2008
- Competitors: 8

Medalists
1st place, gold medalist(s)		Dirceu Pinto; Eliseu Santos	Brazil
2nd place, silver medalist(s)		Fernando Pereira; Bruno Valentim	Portugal
3rd place, bronze medalist(s)		Ladislav Kratina; Radek Prochazka	Czech Republic

The Boccia Pairs BC4 event at the 2008 Summer Paralympics was held in the Olympic Green Convention Center on 10–12 September. The preliminary stages consisted of 2 round-robin groups of 4 pairs each. The top two teams in each group qualified for the final stages. The event was won by the team representing Brazil.

== Results ==
- indicates a match in which an extra (fifth) end was played.

=== Preliminaries ===
==== Pool A ====
Rank	Team	MP	W	L	Points	CZE	POR	HKG	CHN
1	Ladislav Kratina (CZE); Radek Prochazka (CZE)	3	2	1	17:9	x	5:6*	4:2	8:1
2	Fernando Pereira (POR); Bruno Valentim (POR)	3	2	1	15:8	6:5*	x	2:3	7:0
3	Lau Wai Yan Vivian (HKG); Leung Yuk Wing (HKG)	3	2	1	13:10	2:4	3:2	x	8:4
4	Ni Suili (CHN); Qi Cuifang (CHN)	3	0	3	5:23	1:8	0:7	4:8	x

==== Pool B ====
Rank	Team	MP	W	L	Points	ESP	BRA	SVK	HUN
1	Jose Maria Dueso (ESP); Maria Desamparados Baixauli (ESP)	3	3	0	17:5	x	5:0	6:1	6:4*
2	Dirceu Pinto (BRA); Eliseu Santos (BRA)	3	2	1	12:7	0:5	x	6:0	6:2
3	Robert Durkovic (SVK); Martin Streharsky (SVK)	3	1	2	6:16	1:6	0:6	x	5:4
4	Dezso Beres (HUN); Jozsef Gyurkota (HUN)	3	0	3	10:17	4:6*	2:6	4:5	x

=== Competition bracket ===
Semi-finals
Ladislav Kratina (CZE); Radek Prochazka (CZE)	1
Dirceu Pinto (BRA); Eliseu Santos (BRA)	4
Jose Maria Dueso (ESP); Maria Desamparados Baixauli (ESP)	3*
Fernando Pereira (POR); Bruno Valentim (POR)	4*

Final
Dirceu Pinto (BRA); Eliseu Santos (BRA)	5
Fernando Pereira (POR); Bruno Valentim (POR)	2
Third place
Ladislav Kratina (CZE); Radek Prochazka (CZE)	7
Jose Maria Dueso (ESP); Maria Desamparados Baixauli (ESP)	3
