= Swimming at the 2008 Summer Paralympics – Men's 200 metre freestyle S2 =

Men's 200 metre freestyle S2 at the XIII Paralympic Games
- Venue: Beijing National Aquatics Center
- Dates: September 7
- Competitors: 9 from 8 nations

Medalists
1st place, gold medalist(s)		Dmitrii Kokarev	Russia
2nd place, silver medalist(s)		Jim Anderson	Great Britain
3rd place, bronze medalist(s)		Georgios Kapellakis	Greece

The men's 200 metre freestyle S2 event at the 2008 Paralympic Games took place on September 7, at the Beijing National Aquatics Center.

Two heats were held, with four swimmers in the first heat and five in the second heat. The swimmers with the eight fastest times advanced to the final; there, they all competed in a single final heat to earn final placements.

== Heats ==
=== Heat 1 ===
Rank	Lane	Name	Nationality	Time	Notes
1	4	Dmitrii Kokarev	Russia	4:50.77	Q
2	5	Georgios Kappellakis	Greece	5:12.99	Q
3	3	Denys Zhumela	Ukraine	5:25.96	Q
4	6	Iyad Shalabai	Israel	5:41.04	Q

=== Heat 2 ===
Rank	Lane	Name	Nationality	Time	Notes
1	4	Jim Anderson	Great Britain	5:13.60	Q
2	5	Gabriel Feiten	Brazil	5:19.41	Q
3	3	Adriano Pereira (swimmer)	Brazil	5:21.11	Q
4	6	Christian Goldbach	Germany	5:39.65	Q
5	2	Curtis Lovejoy	United States	5:43.52	

== Final ==
Rank	Lane	Name	Nationality	Time	Notes
1	4	Dmitrii Kokarev	Russia	4:45.43	
2	3	Jim Anderson	Great Britain	5:00.03	
3	5	Georgios Kapellakis	Greece	5:05.91	
4	7	Denys Zhumela	Ukraine	5:16.30	
5	2	Adriano Pereira	Brazil	5:21.35	
6	8	Iyad Shalabi	Israel	5:34.37	
7	1	Christian Goldbach	Germany	5:37.09	
8	6	Gabriel Feiten	Brazil	5:38.42	
