= Swimming at the 2008 Summer Paralympics – Men's 50 metre butterfly S6 =

Men's 50m Butterfly S6 at the XIII Paralympic Games
- Venue: Beijing National Aquatics Center
- Dates: 13 September
- Competitors: 13 from 11 nations
- Winning time: 30.79

Medalists
| 1st place, gold medalist(s) | | Xu Qing | China |
| 2nd place, silver medalist(s) | | Kyosuke Oyama | Japan |
| 3rd place, bronze medalist(s) | | Sascha Kindred | Great Britain |

The men's 50m butterfly S6 event at the 2008 Summer Paralympics took place at the Beijing National Aquatics Center on 13 September. There were two heats; the swimmers with the eight fastest times advanced to the final.

== Results ==
=== Heats ===
Competed from 09:15.

==== Heat 1 ====
| Rank | Name | Nationality | Time | Notes |
|---|---|---|---|---|
| 1 | Kyosuke Oyama | Japan | 32.59 | Q |
| 2 | Sascha Kindred | Great Britain | 33.12 | Q |
| 3 | Daniel Vidal | Spain | 34.00 | Q |
| 4 | Luis Silva | Brazil | 36.24 | Q |
| 5 | Iaroslav Semenenko | Ukraine | 37.08 | |
| | Liu Ce | China | | DQ |

==== Heat 2 ====
| Rank | Name | Nationality | Time | Notes |
|---|---|---|---|---|
| 1 | Xu Qing | China | 31.89 | Q, WR |
| 2 | Igor Plotnikov | Russia | 33.26 | Q |
| 3 | Li Peng | China | 33.45 | Q |
| 4 | Mateusz Michalski | Poland | 36.07 | Q |
| 5 | Zoltan Bencsura | Hungary | 36.95 | |
| 6 | Stian Helgeland | Norway | 37.41 | |
| 7 | Naing Sit Aung | Myanmar | 38.13 | |

=== Final ===
Competed at 17:11.

| Rank | Name | Nationality | Time | Notes |
|---|---|---|---|---|
| 1st place, gold medalist(s) | Xu Qing | China | 30.79 | WR |
| 2nd place, silver medalist(s) | Kyosuke Oyama | Japan | 31.01 | |
| 3rd place, bronze medalist(s) | Sascha Kindred | Great Britain | 32.49 | |
| 4 | Li Peng | China | 32.83 | |
| 5 | Daniel Vidal | Spain | 32.97 | |
| 6 | Igor Plotnikov | Russia | 33.25 | |
| 7 | Mateusz Michalski | Poland | 35.20 | |
| 8 | Luis Silva | Brazil | 37.90 | |

Q = qualified for final. WR = World Record. DQ = Disqualified.
