= Cycling at the 2008 Summer Paralympics – Men's individual pursuit (LC 3) =

Event at the 2008 Summer paralympics

Men's Individual Pursuit LC3 at the XIII Paralympic Games
- Paralympic Cycling (track)
- Venue: Laoshan Velodrome
- Dates: 9 September 2008
- Competitors: 11 from 10 nations

Medalists
1st place, gold medalist(s)		Simon Richardson	Great Britain
2nd place, silver medalist(s)		Masaki Fujita	Japan
3rd place, bronze medalist(s)		Tobias Graf	Germany

The Men's individual pursuit LC3 track cycling event at the 2008 Summer Paralympics was competed on 9 September. It was won by Simon Richardson, representing Great Britain.

== Qualifying ==
Qualified for gold medal race
Qualified for bronze medal race

9 Sept. 2008, 09:30

Rank	Athlete	Time	Notes
1	Simon Richardson (GBR)	3:48.18	WR
2	Masaki Fujita (JPN)	3:52.25	
3	Tobias Graf (GER)	3:54.54	
4	Laurent Thirionet (FRA)	3:57.23	
5	Fabrizio Macchi (ITA)	4:00.40	
6	Antonio Garcia (ESP)	4:00.70	
7	Erich Stauffer (AUT)	4:06.17	
8	Michael Milton (AUS)	4:10.44	
9	Stéphane Bahier (FRA)	4:12.02	
10	Zhang Lu (CHN)	4:21.75	
	Flaviano Carvalho (BRA)	DSQ	

== Final round ==
9 Sept. 2008, 16:05

Gold

Rank	Athlete	Time	Notes
1st place, gold medalist(s)	Simon Richardson (GBR)	3:57.51	
2nd place, silver medalist(s)	Masaki Fujita (JPN)	3:59.02	

Bronze

Rank	Athlete	Time	Notes
3rd place, bronze medalist(s)	Tobias Graf (GER)	3:49.21	
4	Laurent Thirionet (FRA)	3:55.54	
