= Xu Qing (swimmer) =

Chinese Paralympic swimmer

Personal information
- Full name: 许庆 (Xu Qing)
- Nationality: Chinese
- Born: September 27, 1992 (age 33)

Sport
- Sport: Swimming
- Strokes: Butterfly, freestyle, medley
Medal record
Paralympic Swimming
Representing China
Paralympic Games
| Gold medal – first place | 2008 Beijing | Men's 50 metre freestyle S6 |
| Gold medal – first place | 2008 Beijing | Men's 50 metre butterfly S6 |
| Gold medal – first place | 2008 Beijing | Men's 4 x 50 metre medley relay – 20 points |
| Gold medal – first place | 2012 London | Men's 50 metre freestyle S6 |
| Gold medal – first place | 2012 London | Men's 100 metre freestyle S6 |
| Gold medal – first place | 2012 London | Men's 50 metre butterfly S6 |
| Gold medal – first place | 2012 London | Men's 50 metre Individual Medley SM6 |
| Bronze medal – third place | 2008 Beijing | Men's 200 metre individual medley SM6 |
| Gold medal – first place | 2016 Rio | Men's 50 metre butterfly S6 |
| Gold medal – first place | 2016 Rio | Men's 50 metre freestyle S6 |
| Gold medal – first place | 2016 Rio | Mixed 4 x 50 metre freestyle relay 20 points |
IPC Swimming World Championships
| Gold medal – first place | 2010 Eindhoven | Men's 50 metre butterfly S6 |
| Gold medal – first place | 2013 Montreal | Men's 50 metre freestyle S6 |
| Gold medal – first place | 2015 Glasgow | 50 m freestyle S6 |
| Silver medal – second place | 2010 Eindhoven | Men's 50 metre freestyle S6 |
| Silver medal – second place | 2013 Montreal | Men's 50 metre butterfly S6 |
| Bronze medal – third place | 2013 Montreal | Men's 200 metre Individual Medley SM6 |
| Bronze medal – third place | 2015 Glasgow | 50 m butterfly S6 |

Xu Qing (born September 27, 1992) is a Chinese Paralympic swimmer. He lost both his arms in a car accident when he was 6 and began swimming training at 7, introduced to the sport by a doctor who had himself been a para-athlete.

== Professional career ==
Competing in the S6 classification, Xu won 3 gold and one bronze medal at the 2008 Summer Paralympics and 4 gold medals at the 2012 Summer Paralympics. As of April 2014, Xu holds S6 World records in 50 m freestyle and 50 m butterfly events; he also swam in the 2008 Chinese relay team that holds the 4 x 50 m medley 20pts World Record.
