= Swimming at the 2012 Summer Paralympics – Men's 50 metre butterfly S6 =

Event at the 2012 Summer Paralympics

Men's 50m Butterfly S6 at the XIV Paralympic Games
- Venue: London Aquatics Centre
- Dates: 7 September 2012
- Competitors: 12 from 8 nations
- Winning time: 29.90

Medalists
1st place, gold medalist(s)		Xu Qing	China
2nd place, silver medalist(s)		Zheng Tao	China
3rd place, bronze medalist(s)		Kyosuke Oyama	Japan

The men's 50m butterfly S6 event at the 2012 Summer Paralympics took place at the London Aquatics Centre on 7 September. There were two heats; the swimmers with the eight fastest times advanced to the final.

== Results ==
=== Heats ===
Competed from 10:23.

==== Heat 1 ====
Rank	Lane	Name	Nationality	Time	Notes
1	4	Zheng Tao	China	32.37	Q
2	5	Luo Fangyu	China	32.94	Q
3	6	Iaroslav Semenenko	Ukraine	33.84	Q
4	3	Aaron Rhind	Australia	34.29	Q, OC
5	2	Sit Aung Naing	Myanmar	35.41	
6	7	Reagan Wickens	Australia	38.69	

==== Heat 2 ====
Rank	Lane	Name	Nationality	Time	Notes
1	4	Xu Qing	China	31.37	Q
2	5	Kyosuke Oyama	Japan	31.87	Q
3	6	Nelson Crispín	Colombia	32.42	Q, AM
4	3	Sascha Kindred	Great Britain	33.19	Q
5	2	Matthew Haanappel	Australia	35.46	
6	7	Swen Michaelis	Germany	37.20	

=== Final ===
Competed at 18:23.

Rank	Lane	Name	Nationality	Time	Notes
1st place, gold medalist(s)	4	Xu Qing	China	29.90	WR
2nd place, silver medalist(s)	3	Zheng Tao	China	30.27	
3rd place, bronze medalist(s)	5	Kyosuke Oyama	Japan	31.43	
4	2	Luo Fangyu	China	32.26	
5	6	Nelson Crispín	Colombia	32.71	
6	1	Iaroslav Semenenko	Ukraine	33.47	
7	8	Aaron Rhind	Australia	34.03	OC
	7	Sascha Kindred	Great Britain	DSQ	

'Q = qualified for final. WR = World Record. AM = Americas Record. OC = Oceania Record. DSQ = Disqualified.
