= Walter Endrizzi =

Italian paralympic athlete

Medal record

Track and field (T46)

Representing Italy

Paralympic Games
Bronze medal – third place	2008 Beijing	Marathon - T46

Walter Endrizzi is a Paralympic athlete from Italy competing mainly in category T46 long-distance events.

== Biography ==
He competed in the 2008 Summer Paralympics in Beijing, China. There he won a bronze medal in the men's Marathon - T46 event
