= Athletics at the 2008 Summer Paralympics – Women's 400 metres T12 =

The Women's 400 m T12 had its first round held on September 11, beginning at 18:05 and the A and B Finals were held on September 13 at 12:10.

== Medalists ==
Gold	Assia El'Hannouni; France
Silver	Oxana Boturchuk; Ukraine
Bronze	Terezinha Guilhermina; Brazil

== Results ==
Place	Athlete	Class	Round 1	Final B	Final A
1	Assia El'Hannouni (FRA)	T12	55.41 Q	-	55.06
2	Oxana Boturchuk (UKR)	T12	56.05 Q	-	55.88
3	Terezinha Guilhermina (BRA)	T11	57.70 Q	-	57.02
4	Xin Sun (CHN)	T12	58.79 q	-	1:02.46
5	Evalina Alexandre (ANG)	T12	59.60 q	1:00.46	
6	Maria Jose Alves (BRA)	T12	1:01.79 q	DNS	
7	Sirlene Guilhermino (BRA)	T12	1:02.08 q	DNS	
8	Tracy Hinton (GBR)	T11	58.89		
9	Annalena Knors (GER)	T12	1:02.48		
	Volha Zinkevich (BLR)	T12	DNF		
