= Dmitrii Kokarev (swimmer) =

Russian swimmer (born 1991)

Medal record

Men's para swimming (S2)

Representing Russia

Paralympic Games
Gold medal – first place	2008 Beijing	200 m freestyle S2
Gold medal – first place	2008 Beijing	100 m freestyle S2
Gold medal – first place	2008 Beijing	50 m backstroke S2
Silver medal – second place	2008 Beijing	50 m freestyle S2
Silver medal – second place	2012 London	200 m freestyle S2
Silver medal – second place	2012 London	100 m freestyle S2
Silver medal – second place	2012 London	50 m freestyle S2
Bronze medal – third place	2012 London	50 m backstroke S2

World Championships
Silver medal – second place	2015 Glasgow	50 m backstroke S2
Silver medal – second place	2015 Glasgow	100 m backstroke S2
Silver medal – second place	2015 Glasgow	200 m freestyle S2

European Championships
Gold medal – first place	2014 Eindhoven	50 m freestyle S2
Gold medal – first place	2014 Eindhoven	100 m freestyle S2
Gold medal – first place	2016 Funchal	200 m freestyle S2
Gold medal – first place	2016 Funchal	100 m backstroke S2
Silver medal – second place	2009 Reykjavik	200 m freestyle S2
Silver medal – second place	2009 Reykjavik	50 m freestyle S2
Silver medal – second place	2014 Eindhoven	100 m freestyle S2
Bronze medal – third place	2016 Funchal	50 m freestyle S2
Bronze medal – third place	2016 Funchal	50 m backstroke S2

Dmitrii Vasilyevich Kokarev (also spelled Dmitry, Russian: Дми́трий Васи́льевич Ко́карев; born February 11, 1991, in Nizhny Novgorod) is a Russian para-swimmer.

== Career ==
He represented Russia at the 2008 Summer Paralympics in Beijing, winning two gold medals in the 200 metre freestyle and 100 metre freestyle events. Kokarev competes in the S2 disability category, for athletes with severe disabilities. He set a world record in the S2 200 metres (660 ft) freestyle, with a time of 4:45.43. His time in the 100 metres (330 ft) event was 2:19.39.
