= Pablo Cimadevila =

Spanish Paralympic swimmer

Personal information
- Full name: Pablo Cimadevila Álvarez
- Nationality: Spain
- Born: 12 December 1978 (age 47) Pontevedra, Spain
- Website: PabloCimadevila.com

Sport
- Sport: Swimming
Medal record
Men's para swimming
Representing Spain
Paralympic Games
Gold medal – first place	2000 Sydney	200 m medley SM5
Bronze medal – third place	2004 Athens	4x50 m medley 20pts
Bronze medal – third place	2008 Beijing	200 m medley SM5
Bronze medal – third place	2008 Beijing	4x50 m medley 20pts

Pablo Cimadevila Álvarez (born 12 December 1978) is an S6 swimmer from Spain. He competed at the 2000 Summer Paralympics, winning a gold in the 200 meter individual medley. He competed at the 2004 Summer Paralympics, winning a bronze medal in the 4×50 meter medley relay 20 pts race. He competed at the 2008 Summer Paralympics, winning a bronze in the 200 meter individual medley race and a bronze in the 4×50 m medley 20 points race. He competed at the 2012 Summer Paralympics, where he did not win a medal.

He was born in Pontevedra. In 2010, Cimadevila raced at the Tenerife International Open.

Cimadevila is a jewellery designer and jeweler. He has a brand called Kamikaze jewels. He has a YouTube channel with over four million subscribers, in which he posts videos demonstrating the making of his designs.
