= Zsolt Vereczkei =

Hungarian Paralympic swimmer

Personal information
- Born: 22 February 1977 (age 49) Nyírbátor, Hungary
- Home town: Baja, Hungary

Sport
- Country: Hungary
- Sport: Paralympic swimming
- Disability: Limb deficiency
- Disability class: S5
- Club: Bajai Spartacus SC
- Coached by: Annamária Sebők; Ferenc Pass
Medal record
Paralympic swimming
Representing Hungary
Paralympic Games
Gold medal – first place	1992 Barcelona	Men's 50m backstroke S5
Gold medal – first place	1996 Atlanta	Men's 50m backstroke S5
Gold medal – first place	2000 Sydney	Men's 50m backstroke S5
Bronze medal – third place	2004 Athens	Men's 50m backstroke S5
Bronze medal – third place	2008 Beijing	Men's 50m backstroke S5
Bronze medal – third place	2012 London	Men's 50m backstroke S5
Bronze medal – third place	2016 Rio de Janeiro	Men's 50m backstroke S5
World Championships
Gold medal – first place	1994 Malta	Men's 50m backstroke S5
Gold medal – first place	1998 Christchurch	Men's 50m backstroke S5
Silver medal – second place	2010 Eindhoven	Men's 50m backstroke S5
Bronze medal – third place	2002 Mar del Plata	Men's 50m backstroke S5

Zsolt Vereczkei (born 22 February 1977) is a Hungarian backstroke Paralympic swimmer and former world record holder.

He was awarded the Order of Merit of the Republic of Hungary in 2016 and the Halassy Olivér Prize from the Hungarian Paralympic Committee for his services to Paralympic sports.
