= Tito Sena =

Brazilian Paralympic athlete

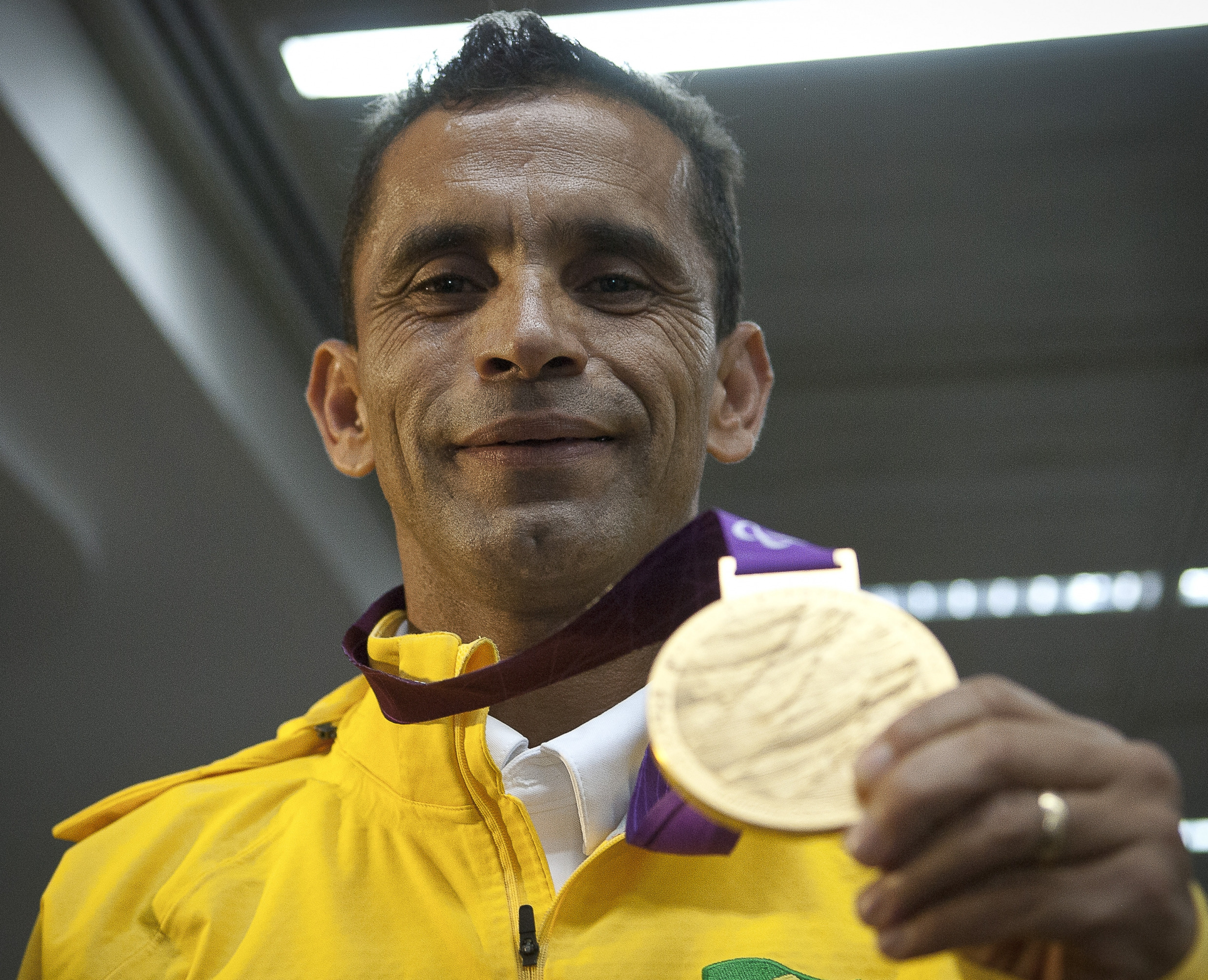
- Sena in 2012

Personal information
- Born: 6 February 1967 (age 59) Brasília, Brazil

Sport
- Sport: Para athletics
- Disability class: T46
- Event: Marathon
Medal record
Representing Brazil
Paralympic Games
| Gold medal – first place | 2012 London | Marathon – T46 |
| Silver medal – second place | 2008 Beijing | Marathon – T46 |
World Championships
| Gold medal – first place | 2006 Assen | Marathon – T46 |
| Silver medal – second place | 2011 Christchurch | Marathon – T46 |
Parapan American Games
| Silver medal – second place | 2007 Rio de Janeiro | 5000 m – T46 |

Tito Sena (born 6 February 1967) is a Paralympian runner from Brazil who mainly competes in category T46 long-distance events. He won a silver medal in the marathon at the 2008 Paralympics and a gold at the 2012 Games.
