= José María Dueso =

Spanish boccia player

Personal information
- Full name: José María Dueso Villar
- Nationality: Spanish
- Born: 30 October 1974 (age 51)

Sport
- Country: Spain
- Sport: Boccia

José María Dueso Villar (born 30 October 1974) is a Spanish boccia player, who has represented the country internationally at the Paralympic Games.

== Boccia ==
Dueso is a BC4 classified boccia player, and is a member of the C.D. Hercesa club.

National Institute of Physical Education Lleida hosted the 2008 Spanish national championships. Dueso competed in this event. Lisbon hosted the World Championships in June 2010, and he was a member of the Spain national team. Competing in the individual BC4 event, he was eliminated in the second round by a score of 3.2. Elche, Spain hosted the Spanish Boccia Club Championship in June 2011, with Dueso participating in the event. He finished first in the individual competition and the BC4 open pairs competition while playing for CD Hercesa, Community of Madrid.

The Belfast, Northern Ireland hosted Boccia World Championships were held in August 2011, and Dueso participated. The event was part of the ranking process to qualify for the London Paralympic Games. He was eliminated in the individual event in the quarter-finals. In January 2012, he participated in a boccia training camp organized by Spain's Cerebral Palsy Federation of Sports (FEDPC) and the Spanish Sports Federation for Persons with Physical Disabilities (FEDDF) along with 24 other boccia players from around Spain held at CRE San Andrés. The camp was part of national team preparations for the London Paralympics. Club ADM and the Sociocultural Disability Association (ASCM) organized the June 2012 Spain national championships which he competed in. Playing with Alejandro Piquero Serrano, the pair earned a gold medal in the BC4 pairs event. He competed at the 2012 Summer Paralympics. In the individual BC4 event, he won his qualification round 9–0. In the round of eight, he lost 4–6.

Dueso was a member of the Spain's delegation at the European Championships contested in June 2013 in Guimaraes, Portugal. In October 2013, he was ranked Spain's best competitor in his classification.
