= Kyosuke Oyama =

Japanese Paralympic swimmer

Personal information
- Born: 26 December 1987 (age 38)
Medal record
Men's swimming
Representing Japan
Paralympic Games
Silver medal – second place	2008 Beijing	4x60 metre relay - S6
Bronze medal – third place	2012 London	Men's 50 m Butterfly - S6
IPC World Championships
Bronze medal – third place	2013 Montreal	400 m freestyle – S6

Kyosuke Oyama (小山 恭輔, Oyama Kyosuke, born 26 December 1987) is a Paralympic swimmer from Japan competing mainly in category S6 events.

Oyama grew up in Higashikurume in the western part of the Tokyo metropolits. As a junior high school student, he was paralyzed in half of his body.

He competed in the 50m, 100m and 400m freestyle at the 2008 Summer Paralympics but it was in the 50m butterfly that he won his only medal, a silver behind Xu Qing of China who broke the world record in winning the race.
