= Lucas Ludwig =

German Paralympic swimmer

Personal information
- Born: 30 August 1989 (age 36) Salzwedel, Germany
- Home town: Cottbus, Germany
- Height: 191 cm (6 ft 3 in)
- Weight: 77 kg (170 lb)

Sport
- Country: Germany
- Sport: Paralympic swimming
- Disability: Club foot
- Disability class: S10
- Club: PSC Berlin
Medal record
Paralympic swimming
Representing Germany
World Championships (SC)
Bronze medal – third place	2009 Rio de Janeiro	Men's 100m individual medley SM10
European Championships
Gold medal – first place	2009 Reykjavik	Men's 100m freestyle S10
Gold medal – first place	2009 Reykjavik	Men's 200m individual medley SM10
Gold medal – first place	2011 Berlin	5km open water
Silver medal – second place	2009 Reykjavik	Men's 50m freestyle S10
Silver medal – second place	2009 Reykjavik	Men's 400m freestyle S10
Silver medal – second place	2009 Reykjavik	Men's 100m backstroke S10
Silver medal – second place	2011 Berlin	Men's 50m freestyle S10
Silver medal – second place	2011 Berlin	Men's 400m freestyle S10
Silver medal – second place	2011 Berlin	Men's 100m backstroke S10
Silver medal – second place	2011 Berlin	Men's 200m individual medley SM10
Bronze medal – third place	2009 Reykjavik	Men's 100m butterfly S10
Bronze medal – third place	2009 Reykjavik	Men's 4x100m medley relay

Lucas Ludwig (born 30 August 1989) is a former German Paralympic swimmer who competed in international level events. He is a double European champion and a World bronze medalist, he has competed at the Paralympic Games twice but did not medal in his events.
