= Jordi Gordillo =

Spanish Paralympic swimmer (born 1983)

Personal information
- Full name: Jordi Gordillo Brunet
- Nationality: Spain
- Born: 16 August 1983 (age 42) Barcelona, Spain

Sport
- Sport: Swimming
- Classifications: S5
Medal record
Men's swimming
Representing Spain
Paralympic Games
| Gold medal – first place | 2000 Sydney | 4x50m medley relay 20pts |
| Silver medal – second place | 2008 Beijing | 4x50m freestyle relay 20pts |
| Bronze medal – third place | 2004 Athens | 4x50m medley relay 20pts |
World Championships
| Gold medal – first place | 2002 Mar del Plata | 4x50m freestyle relay 20pts |
| Gold medal – first place | 2006 Durban | 4x50m freestyle relay 20pts |
| Gold medal – first place | 2010 Eindhoven | 4x50m freestyle relay 20pts |
| Bronze medal – third place | 2010 Eindhoven | 4x50m medley relay 20pts |

Jordi Gordillo Brunet (born 16 August 1983 in Barcelona) is a S5 classified swimmer from Spain. He has cerebral palsy. He competed at the 2000 Summer Paralympics in Sydney, Australia. He competed at the 2004 Summer Paralympics in Athens, Greece, winning a bronze medal in the 4 x 50 meter 20 point medley relay. He competed at the 2008 Summer Paralympics in Beijing, China, winning a silver medal in the 4 x 50 meter 20 point medley relay.

From the Catalan region of Spain, he was a recipient of a 2012 Plan ADO scholarship.
