= Luis Silva (swimmer) =

Brazilian swimmer

Personal information
- Born: Bagé, Brazil
- Height: 180 cm (5 ft 11 in)
- Weight: 60 kg (132 lb)

Sport
- Country: Brazil
- Sport: Paralympic swimming
- Disability class: S6, SB5, SM5
Medal record
Paralympic swimming
Representing Brazil
Paralympic Games
Gold medal – first place	2004 Athens	Men's 4x50m freestyle relay
Silver medal – second place	2000 Sydney	Men's 50m butterfly S6
Silver medal – second place	2000 Sydney	Men's 4x50m freestyle relay
Silver medal – second place	2000 Sydney	Men's 4x50m medley relay
Silver medal – second place	2004 Athens	Men's 4x50m freestyle relay
Silver medal – second place	2008 Beijing	Men's 4x50m medley relay
Bronze medal – third place	2000 Sydney	Men's 4x100m freestyle relay
World Championships
Gold medal – first place	2006 Durban	Men's 4x50m medley relay
Parapan American Games
Silver medal – second place	2003 Mar del Plata	Men's 100m freestyle S6

Luis Silva is a Paralympic swimmer. His achievements include winning three silver medals and one bronze medal at the 2000 Summer Paralympics.
