= Adriano Lima =

Brazilian Paralympic swimmer (1973–2026)

Personal information
- Full name: Adriano Gomes de Lima
- Nickname: Batman
- Born: 21 June 1973 Natal, Rio Grande do Norte, Brazil
- Died: 7 February 2026 (aged 52) Natal, Rio Grande do Norte, Brazil
- Height: 1.69 m (5 ft 7 in)
- Weight: 62 kg (137 lb)

Sport
- Country: Brazil
- Sport: Paralympic swimming
- Disability: Spinal cord injury
- Disability class: S6
Medal record
Paralympic swimming
Representing Brazil
Paralympic Games
| Gold medal – first place | 2004 Athens | 4x50m medley relay |
| Silver medal – second place | 2000 Sydney | 100m freestyle S6 |
| Silver medal – second place | 2000 Sydney | 4x50m freestyle relay |
| Silver medal – second place | 2000 Sydney | 4x50m medley relay |
| Silver medal – second place | 2004 Athens | 4x50m freestyle relay |
| Silver medal – second place | 2008 Beijing | 4x50m medley relay |
| Bronze medal – third place | 1996 Atlanta | 50m freestyle S6 |
| Bronze medal – third place | 2000 Sydney | 4x100m freestyle relay |
| Bronze medal – third place | 2008 Beijing | 4x50m freestyle relay |
World Championships (LC)
| Gold medal – first place | 2013 Montreal | 4x50m freestyle relay |
| Silver medal – second place | 2002 Mar del Plata | 100m freestyle S6 |
| Bronze medal – third place | 2002 Mar del Plata | 50m freestyle S6 |
| Bronze medal – third place | 2010 Eindhoven | 100m freestyle S6 |
World Championships (SC)
| Silver medal – second place | 2009 Rio de Janeiro | 100m freestyle S6 |
| Silver medal – second place | 2009 Rio de Janeiro | 4x50m freestyle relay |
| Silver medal – second place | 2009 Rio de Janeiro | 4x50m medley relay |
| Bronze medal – third place | 2009 Rio de Janeiro | 50m freestyle S6 |
| Bronze medal – third place | 2009 Rio de Janeiro | 400m freestyle S6 |
Parapan American Games
| Gold medal – first place | 2003 Mar del Plata | 50m freestyle S6 |
| Gold medal – first place | 2003 Mar del Plata | 100m freestyle S6 |
| Gold medal – first place | 2003 Mar del Plata | 400m freestyle S6 |
| Gold medal – first place | 2003 Mar del Plata | 100m breaststroke SB5 |
| Gold medal – first place | 2007 Rio de Janeiro | 4x100m freestyle relay |
| Gold medal – first place | 2007 Rio de Janeiro | 4x50m medley relay |
| Gold medal – first place | 2007 Rio de Janeiro | 50m freestyle S6 |
| Gold medal – first place | 2007 Rio de Janeiro | 100m freestyle S6 |
| Gold medal – first place | 2007 Rio de Janeiro | 400m freestyle S6 |
| Gold medal – first place | 2007 Rio de Janeiro | 200m individual medley SM6 |
| Gold medal – first place | 2011 Guadalajara | 4x50m freestyle relay |
| Silver medal – second place | 2007 Rio de Janeiro | 50m butterfly S6 |
| Silver medal – second place | 2011 Guadalajara | 100m breaststroke SB5 |
| Bronze medal – third place | 2011 Guadalajara | 50m freestyle S6 |
| Bronze medal – third place | 2011 Guadalajara | 100m freestyle S6 |
| Bronze medal – third place | 2011 Guadalajara | 400m freestyle S6 |
| Bronze medal – third place | 2011 Guadalajara | 200m individual medley SM6 |

Adriano Gomes de Lima (21 June 1973 – 7 February 2026) was a Brazilian Paralympic swimmer who competed in international elite competitions. He was an eleven-time Parapan American Games champion, won nine Paralympic medals and was also nine-time World medalist. Lima became a paraplegic after falling off a roof while working at a construction site aged seventeen.

Lima died of bone cancer on 7 February 2026, at the age of 52.
