= Curtis Lovejoy =

American Paralympic swimmer (1957–2021)

Personal information
- Born: May 13, 1957 Atlanta, Georgia, U.S.
- Died: March 11, 2021 (aged 63)

Sport
- Sport: Swimming
- Classifications: S2
Medal record
Men's swimming
Representing United States
Summer Paralympics
Gold medal – first place	2000 Sydney	50m freestyle S2
Gold medal – first place	2000 Sydney	100m freestyle S2
Silver medal – second place	2004 Athens	100m freestyle S2
Bronze medal – third place	2004 Athens	50m freestyle S2
World Championships (LC)
Gold medal – first place	2002 Mar del Plata	50m freestyle S2
Gold medal – first place	2006 Durban	150m individual medley SM2
Silver medal – second place	1998 Christchurch	50m breaststroke SB1
Silver medal – second place	2002 Mar del Plata	150m individual medley SM2
Bronze medal – third place	2002 Mar del Plata	100m freestyle S2
Bronze medal – third place	2006 Durban	50m freestyle S2
Bronze medal – third place	2006 Durban	200m freestyle S2
Bronze medal – third place	2006 Durban	4x50m freestyle relay
World Championships (SC)
Gold medal – first place	2009 Rio de Janeiro	50m freestyle S3
Bronze medal – third place	2009 Rio de Janeiro	4x50m freestyle relay
Parapan American Games
Silver medal – second place	2015 Toronto	4x50m freestyle relay

Curtis Lovejoy (May 13, 1957 – March 11, 2021) was an American Paralympic swimmer. In 2000, he won the gold medal in the men's 50 metre freestyle S2 and the men's 100 metre freestyle S2 events at the Summer Paralympics held in Sydney, Australia. He also won two medals in swimming at the 2004 Summer Paralympics held in Athens, Greece. He also competed in wheelchair fencing.

== Early life ==
In 1986, Lovejoy was paralyzed from the neck down after a car accident. He took up swimming as therapy after his accident.

== Career ==
In 2009, Lovejoy won the gold medal in the men's 50 metre freestyle S3 event at the 2009 IPC Swimming World Championships 25 m held in Rio de Janeiro, Brazil with a new world record of 55.77s. He also won the bronze medal in the men's 4×50 m freestyle relay 20 pts event. Lovejoy was inducted into the Georgia Aquatics Hall of Fame in 2013.

In 2015, Lovejoy competed in swimming at the Parapan American Games held in Toronto, Canada. He won the silver medal in the mixed 4 x 50 metre freestyle relay 20pts event. Lovejoy was also the flag bearer for the United States during the opening ceremony of the 2015 Parapan American Games. In 2019, he was inducted into the Atlanta Sports Hall of Fame.

He died on March 11, 2021. He retired earlier in 2021 after being diagnosed with a form of blood cancer.
