= Francisco Avelino =

Brazilian Paralympic swimmer

Personal information
- Full name: Francisco de Assis Avelino
- Born: 15 February 1966 (age 60) Natal, Rio Grande do Norte, Brazil

Sport
- Country: Brazil
- Sport: Paralympic swimming
- Disability: Polio
- Disability class: S5
Medal record
Paralympic swimming
Representing Brazil
Paralympic Games
Gold medal – first place	2004 Athens	4x50m medley relay 20pts
Silver medal – second place	2000 Sydney	4x50m medley relay 20pts
Silver medal – second place	2008 Beijing	4x50m medley relay 20pts
Bronze medal – third place	2004 Athens	100m breaststroke SB4
Parapan American Games
Gold medal – first place	2003 Mar del Plata	50m freestyle S5
Gold medal – first place	2003 Mar del Plata	50m backstroke S5
Gold medal – first place	2011 Guadalajara	4x50m medley relay
Silver medal – second place	2003 Mar del Plata	100m freestyle S5
Silver medal – second place	2003 Mar del Plata	100m breaststroke SB4
Silver medal – second place	2007 Rio de Janeiro	50m backstroke S5
Silver medal – second place	2011 Guadalajara	50m backstroke S5
Bronze medal – third place	2007 Rio de Janeiro	100m freestyle S5
Bronze medal – third place	2011 Guadalajara	50m freestyle S5
Bronze medal – third place	2011 Guadalajara	100m breaststroke SB4
Bronze medal – third place	2015 Toronto	100m breaststroke SB4

Francisco de Assis Avelino (born 15 February 1966) is a retired Brazilian Paralympic swimmer who competed at international elite competitions. He is a three-time Parapan American Games champion and a Paralympic champion.
