= Roy Perkins =

American Paralympic swimmer (born 1990)

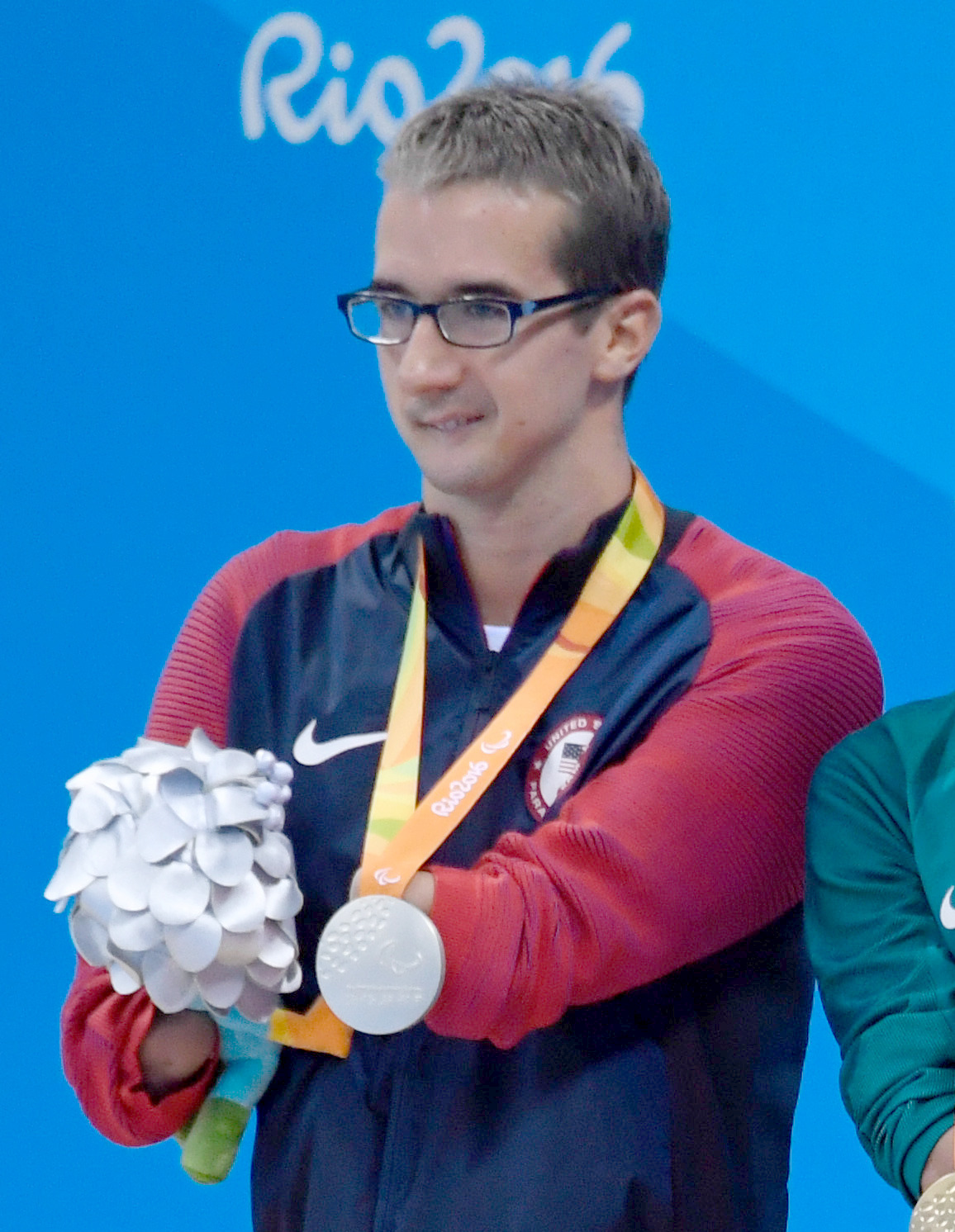
- Perkins at the 2016 Paralympics

Personal information
- Nationality: United States
- Born: May 9, 1990 (age 36) Washington, D.C., United States
- Height: 6 ft 1 in (1.85 m)
- Weight: 140 lb (64 kg)

Sport
- Sport: Swimming
Medal record
Representing United States
Paralympic Games
Gold medal – first place	2008 Beijing	50 m butterfly S5
Gold medal – first place	2016 Rio de Janeiro	50 m butterfly S5
Silver medal – second place	2012 London	50 m butterfly S5
Silver medal – second place	2012 London	100 m freestyle S5
Silver medal – second place	2016 Rio de Janeiro	200 m freestyle S5
Bronze medal – third place	2008 Beijing	100 m freestyle S5
Bronze medal – third place	2012 London	50 m freestyle S5
Bronze medal – third place	2012 London	200 m freestyle S5
World Championships
Silver medal – second place	2015 Glasgow	50 m butterfly S5
Silver medal – second place	2015 Glasgow	100 m freestyle S5
Bronze medal – third place	2015 Glasgow	200 m freestyle S5

Roy Perkins (born May 9, 1990) is an American paralympic swimmer who competes in the S5 classification. At the 2008 Summer Paralympics in Beijing, Perkins won one gold and one bronze medal. At the 2012 Summer Paralympics in London, he won two silver and two bronze medals. At the 2016 Summer Paralympics he won one gold and one silver medal.

Perkins was born without hands or feet and first learned to swim when he was 12 years old. He attended The Bishop's School in San Diego and later Stanford University. In 2006, the San Diego Hall of Champions named him its Challenged Athlete Star of the Year.
