= He Junquan =

Chinese Paralympic swimmer

Medal record

Men's swimming

Representing China

Paralympic Games
Gold medal – first place	2000 Sydney	50 m butterfly S5
Gold medal – first place	2004 Athens	200 m individual medley SM5
Gold medal – first place	2004 Athens	4×50 m freestyle 20pts
Gold medal – first place	2004 Athens	50 m backstroke S5
Gold medal – first place	2004 Athens	50 m butterfly S5
Gold medal – first place	2008 Beijing	4x50 m freestyle 20pts
Gold medal – first place	2008 Beijing	4x50 m medley 20pts
Silver medal – second place	2000 Sydney	50 m backstroke S5
Silver medal – second place	2008 Beijing	50 m backstroke S5
Silver medal – second place	2012 London	50 m backstroke S5
Bronze medal – third place	2000 Sydney	4×50 m medley 20pts
Bronze medal – third place	2012 London	50 m butterfly S5

He Junquan is a Chinese swimmer and multiple Paralympic gold medallist.

He represented China at the 2000 Summer Paralympics, winning a bronze medal, a gold and a silver. Competing again at the 2004 Paralympics, he won four gold medals. He is representing China again at the 2008 Summer Paralympics. In his favorite event, the 50 m backstroke, he earned a silver, "outtouched" 0.15 seconds by Brazilian Daniel Dias. His first gold came in 4X50m freestyle where China set a world record with a time of 2 mins 18.15 secs. A second world record and gold followed in the Men's 4 x 50m Medley 20pts. He also competed at the 2012 Summer Paralympics in London, winning a second silver in the 50m backstroke S5, and later a bronze in the 50m butterfly S5.

He Junquan has no arms. He has stated that, having to hit the edge of the pool with his head to stop the chronometre, he frequently scratches his scalp and hurts his back and neck.

Reporting on the competition at the 2008 Games, Will Swanton of the Sydney Morning Herald wrote:

"The Water Cube has been a sight for sore eyes. China's He Junquan, with no arms, was leading the 50m backstroke final. He approached the wall with a narrow lead. Every person in the stadium who had feet was on them. There was an almighty din, red Chinese flags everywhere. He came to the finish - and had to crash into the wall with his head. As He slowed down to lessen the impact, Brazilian Daniel Dias hit the wall first with an outstretched hand. You've never heard a silence like it.
Presented with his silver medal and flowers at the presentation ceremony, He put the flowers between his teeth and bowed."
