= China at the 2008 Summer Paralympics =

- IPC code: CHN
- NPC: China Administration of Sports for Persons with Disabilities
- Website: www.caspd.org.cn

in Beijing
- Competitors: 332 in 20 sports
- Flag bearer: Wang Xiaofu
- Medals Ranked 1st: Gold 89 Silver 70 Bronze 52 Total 211

Summer Paralympics appearances (overview)
- 1984; 1988; 1992; 1996; 2000; 2004; 2008; 2012; 2016; 2020; 2024

China was the host of the 2008 Summer Paralympics, held in Beijing. China's delegation included 547 people, of whom 332 were competitors. The athletes, 197 men and 135 women, ranged in age from 15 to 51 and competed in all twenty sports. 226 of the competitors participated in the Paralympic Games for the first time. The delegation was the largest in Chinese history and at the 2008 Games. China topped the medal count at the 2004 Summer Paralympics in Athens. China dominated the medal count winning the most gold, silver, bronze, and total medals by a wide margin in Beijing.

During the games, some Chinese Paralympians broke 62 world and Paralympic records in athletics, swimming, powerlifting, shooting, cycling and archery. Strong Chinese contenders were Wang Xiaofu and Li Hanhua (swimming), Guo Wei (shot put and javelin), and Zhang Haidong (powerlifting). Olympic competitors will also include Li Duan in the men's long jump. Zhang Xiaoling, ten time gold medallist in table tennis was competing at the Paralympics for the sixth and last time. She won a bronze medal in the women's singles.

Rowing made its Paralympic debut in Beijing, and the Chinese team competed in eight other Paralympic sports for the first time: equestrian, wheelchair rugby, wheelchair basketball, sailing, boccia, goalball, football 5-a-side and football 7-a-side.

== Medalists ==
Medal	Name	Sport	Event
Gold	Cheng Changjie	Archery	Men's individual recurve W1/W2
Gold	Fu Hongzhi; Gao Fangxia; Xiao Yanhong	Archery	Women's team recurve
Gold	Yang Sen	Athletics	Men's 100m T35
Gold	Yu Shiran	Athletics	Men's 200m T53
Gold	Zhang Lixin	Athletics	Men's 200m T54
Gold	Li Yansong	Athletics	Men's 400m T12
Gold	Zhang Lixin	Athletics	Men's 400m T54
Gold	Li Huzhao	Athletics	Men's 800m T53
Gold	Zhang Zhen	Athletics	Men's 1500m T11
Gold	Zhang Zhen	Athletics	Men's 5000m T11
Gold	Qi Shun	Athletics	Men's marathon T12
Gold	Liu Xiangkun; Li Qiang; Yang Yuqing; Li Yansong	Athletics	Men's 4 × 100 m relay T11-13
Gold	Zong Kai; Zhao Ji; Zhang Lixin; Li Huzhao	Athletics	Men's 4 × 100 m relay T53/T54
Gold	Cui Yanfeng; Zhao Ji; Li Huzhao; Zhang Lixin	Athletics	Men's 4 × 400 m relay T53/54
Gold	Li Duan	Athletics	Men's long jump F11
Gold	Li Duan	Athletics	Men's triple jump F11
Gold	Xia Dong	Athletics	Men's javelin throw F37/38
Gold	Fan Liang	Athletics	Men's discus throw F53-54
Gold	Zhu Pengkai	Athletics	Men's javelin throw F11-12
Gold	Guo Wei	Athletics	Men's javelin throw F35-36
Gold	Gao Mingjie	Athletics	Men's javelin throw F42/44
Gold	Guo Wei	Athletics	Men's shot put F35-36
Gold	Xia Dong	Athletics	Men's shot put F37-38
Gold	Wu Chunmiao	Athletics	Women's 100 m T11
Gold	Wang Fang	Athletics	Women's 100m T36
Gold	Huang Lisha	Athletics	Women's 100m T53
Gold	Wang Fang	Athletics	Women's 200m T36
Gold	Huang Lisha	Athletics	Women's 200m T53
Gold	Zhou Hongzhuan	Athletics	Women's 800m T53
Gold	Dong Hongjiao; Liu Wenjun; Huang Lisha; Zhang Ting	Athletics	Women's 4 × 100 m relay T53-54
Gold	Zheng Baozhu	Athletics	Women's shot put F42-46
Gold	Wu Qing	Athletics	Women's discus throw F35-36
Gold	Mi Na	Athletics	Women's discus throw F37-38
Gold	Menggenjimisu	Athletics	Women's discus throw F40
Gold	Wang Jun	Athletics	Women's discus throw F42-46
Gold	Wu Qing	Athletics	Women's javelin throw F35-38
Gold	Yao Juan	Athletics	Women's javelin throw F42-46
Gold	Qing Suping	Athletics	Women's javelin throw F57-58
Gold	Tang Hongxia	Athletics	Women's shot put F12-13
Gold	Mi Na	Athletics	Women's shot put F37-38
Gold	Bao Daolei; Cai Changgui; Chen Liangliang; Du Jinran; Yang Chunhong; Yao Yongquan	Goalball	Men's team
Gold	Guo Hua Ping	Judo	Women's 48 kg
Gold	Cui Na	Judo	Women's 52 kg
Gold	Wang Lijing	Judo	Women's 57 kg
Gold	Yuan Yanping	Judo	Women's +70 kg
Gold	Wu Guojing	Powerlifting	Men's 52 kg
Gold	Liu Lei	Powerlifting	Men's 75 kg
Gold	Zhang Haidong	Powerlifting	Men's 82.5 kg
Gold	Cai Huichao	Powerlifting	Men's 90 kg
Gold	Qi Dong	Powerlifting	Men's 100 kg
Gold	Xiao Cuijuan	Powerlifting	Women's 44 kg
Gold	Bian Jianxin	Powerlifting	Women's 60 kg
Gold	Fu Taoying	Powerlifting	Women's 67.5 kg
Gold	Li Ruifang	Powerlifting	Women's +82.5 kg
Gold	Zhou Yangjing; Shan Zilong	Rowing	Mixed double sculls
Gold	Lin Haiyan	Shooting	Women's 10m air pistol SH1
Gold	Xu Qing	Swimming	Men's 50m freestyle
Gold	Xiaofu Wang	Swimming	Men's 50m freestyle S8
Gold	Du Jianping	Swimming	Men's 100m freestyle S3
Gold	Xiaofu Wang	Swimming	Men's 100m freestyle S8
Gold	Du Jianping	Swimming	Men's 50m backstroke S3
Gold	Yang Bozun	Swimming	Men's 100m backstroke S11
Gold	Xu Qing	Swimming	Men's 50m butterfly S6
Gold	Rong Tian	Swimming	Men's 50m butterfly S7
Gold	Du Jianping; He Junquan; Tang Yuan; Yang Yuanrun	Swimming	Men's 4 × 50 m freestyle relay
Gold	Du Jianping; Tang Yuan; Xu Qing; Yang Yuanrun	Swimming	Men's 4 × 50 m medley relay
Gold	Xie Qing	Swimming	Women's 100m freestyle S11
Gold	Jiang Fuying	Swimming	Women's 50m butterfly S6
Gold	Min Huang	Swimming	Women's 50m butterfly S7
Gold	Feng Panfeng	Table tennis	Men's singles class 3
Gold	Chen Gang	Table tennis	Men's singles class 8
Gold	Ge Yang	Table tennis	Men's singles class 9–10
Gold	Ye Chaoqun	Table tennis	Men's team class 6–8
Gold	Ge Yang; Ma Lin	Table tennis	Men's team class 9–10
Gold	Liu Jing	Table tennis	Women's singles class 1–2
Gold	Li Qian	Table tennis	Women's singles class 3
Gold	Zhou Ying	Table tennis	Women's singles class 4
Gold	Ren Guixiang	Table tennis	Women's singles class 5
Gold	Lei Lina	Table tennis	Women's singles class 9
Gold	Li Qian; Liu Jing	Table tennis	Women's team class 1–3
Gold	Ren Guixiang; Gu Gai	Table tennis	Women's team class 4–5
Gold	Lei Lina; Fan Lei	Table tennis	Women's team class 6–10
Gold	Li Liping; Liang Fen; Liu Lijuan; Lu Chunli; Lu Hongqin; Sheng Yuhong; Tan Yanhua; Yang Yanling; Zhang Lijun; Zhang Xufei; Zheng Xiongying; Zhong Haihong	Volleyball	Women's team
Gold	Tian Jianquan	Wheelchair fencing	Men's épée A
Gold	Hu Daoliang	Wheelchair fencing	Men's épée B
Gold	Ye Ruyi	Wheelchair fencing	Men's foil A
Gold	Hu Daoliang	Wheelchair fencing	Men's foil B
Gold	Ye Ruyi	Wheelchair fencing	Men's sabre A
Gold	Zhang Chuncui	Wheelchair fencing	Women's épée A
Silver	Chen Yegang; Cheng Changjie; Dong Zhi	Archery	Men's team recurve
Silver	Gao Fangxia	Archery	Women's individual recurve standing
Silver	Fu Hongzhi	Archery	Women's individual recurve W1/W2
Silver	Fu Xinhan	Athletics	Men's 100m T35
Silver	Ma Yuxi	Athletics	Men's 100m T37
Silver	Zhou Wenjun	Athletics	Men's 100m T38
Silver	Li Yansong	Athletics	Men's 200m T12
Silver	Zhou Wenjun	Athletics	Men's 200m T38
Silver	Li Huzhao	Athletics	Men's 400m T53
Silver	He Chengen	Athletics	Men's 800m T36
Silver	Che Mian; Zhou Wenjun; Yang Chen; Ma Yuxi	Athletics	Men's 4 × 100 m T35-38
Silver	Wang Wenbo	Athletics	Men's discus throw F35-36
Silver	Zheng Weihai	Athletics	Men's discus throw F57-58
Silver	Zhang Xuelong	Athletics	Men's javelin throw F37-38
Silver	Zhang Yingbin	Athletics	Men's javelin throw F55-56
Silver	Liu Wenjun	Athletics	Women's 100m T54
Silver	Wu Chunmiao	Athletics	Women's 200m T11
Silver	Zhou Hongzhuan	Athletics	Women's 400m T53
Silver	Menggenjimisu	Athletics	Women's shot put F40
Silver	Zhong Yongyuan	Athletics	Women's shot put F42-46
Silver	Zhang Liangmin	Athletics	Women's discus throw F12-13
Silver	Yang Yue	Athletics	Women's discus throw F42-46
Silver	Wang Ting	Athletics	Women's discus throw F54-56
Silver	Kuidong Zhang	Cycling	Men's 1 km time trial LC1
Silver	Kuidong Zhang; Yuanchao Zheng; Zhang Lu	Cycling	Men's team sprint LC1-4 CP3/4
Silver	Ye Yaping	Cycling	Women's 500m time trial LC1-2/CP 4
Silver	Chen Shanyong; Li Xiaoqiang; Wang Yafeng; Wang Zhoubin; Wei Zheng; Xia Zheng; Yang Xinqiang; Yu Yutan; Zhang Qiang; Zheng Wenfa	Football 5-a-side	Men's team
Silver	Chen Fengqing; Fan Feifei; Lin Shan; Wang Ruixue; Wang Shasha; Xu Juan	Goalball	Women's team
Silver	Xu Zhilin	Judo	Men's 73 kg
Silver	Wang Song	Judo	Men's +100 kg
Silver	Cui Zhe	Powerlifting	Women's 40 kg
Silver	Zuo Jue	Powerlifting	Women's 82.5 kg
Silver	Li Jianfei	Shooting	Mixed 25m pistol SH1
Silver	Zhang Cuiping	Shooting	Mixed 10m air rifle prone SH1
Silver	Zhang Cuiping	Shooting	Mixed 50m rifle prone SH1
Silver	Du Jianping	Swimming	Men's 50m freestyle S3
Silver	Tang Yuan	Swimming	Men's 50m freestyle S6
Silver	Guo Zhi	Swimming	Men's 50m freestyle S9
Silver	Tang Yuan	Swimming	Men's 100m freestyle S6
Silver	Guo Zhi	Swimming	Men's 100m freestyle S9
Silver	Yang Bozun	Swimming	Men's 100m freestyle S11
Silver	Li Hanhua	Swimming	Men's 200m freestyle S3
Silver	Yang Bozun	Swimming	Men's 400m freestyle S11
Silver	He Junquan	Swimming	Men's 50m backstroke S5
Silver	Yuanrun Yang	Swimming	Men's 100m backstroke S6
Silver	Guo Zhi	Swimming	Men's 100m backstroke S9
Silver	Xiaofu Wang	Swimming	Men's 100m breaststroke SB8
Silver	Lin Furong	Swimming	Men's 100m breaststroke SB9
Silver	Yang Bozun	Swimming	Men's 100m breaststroke SB11
Silver	Wei Yanpeng	Swimming	Men's 100m butterfly S8
Silver	He Junquan	Swimming	Men's 200m individual medley SM5
Silver	Yang Yuanrun	Swimming	Men's 200m individual medley SM6
Silver	Tian Rong	Swimming	Men's 200m individual medley SM7
Silver	Wang Jiachao	Swimming	Men's 200m individual medley SM8
Silver	Guo Zhi; Lin Furong; Wang Xiaofu; Wei Yanpeng	Swimming	Men's 4 × 100 m medley relay
Silver	Min Huang	Swimming	Women's 100m breaststroke SB7
Silver	Min Huang	Swimming	Women's 200m individual medley SM7
Silver	Ye Chaoqun	Table tennis	Men's singles class 7
Silver	Ma Lin	Table tennis	Men's singles class 9–10
Silver	Guo Xingyuan; Zhang Yan	Table tennis	Men's team class 4–5
Silver	Gu Gai	Table tennis	Women's singles class 5
Silver	Liu Meili	Table tennis	Women's singles class 9
Silver	Fan Lei	Table tennis	Women's singles class 10
Silver	Zhang Lei	Wheelchair fencing	Men's épée A
Silver	Zhang Lei	Wheelchair fencing	Men's foil A
Silver	Tian Jianquan	Wheelchair fencing	Men's sabre A
Silver	Yao Fang	Wheelchair fencing	Women's épée B
Silver	Zhang Chunchui	Wheelchair fencing	Women's foil A
Silver	Yao Fang	Wheelchair fencing	Women's foil B
Bronze	Xiao Yanhong	Archery	Women's individual recurve W1/W2
Bronze	Yang Yuqing	Athletics	Men's 100m T12
Bronze	Yu Shiran	Athletics	Men's 100m T53
Bronze	Yang Yuqing	Athletics	Men's 200m T12
Bronze	Che Mian	Athletics	Men's 200m T36
Bronze	Ma Yuxi	Athletics	Men's 200m T37
Bronze	Che Mian	Athletics	Men's 400m T36
Bronze	Chen Hongjie	Athletics	Men's high jump F44/46
Bronze	Ma Yuxi	Athletics	Men's long jump F37/38
Bronze	Li Kangyong	Athletics	Men's long jump F46
Bronze	Xia Dong	Athletics	Men's discus throw F37-38
Bronze	Wang Lezheng	Athletics	Men's discus throw F42
Bronze	Gao Changlong	Athletics	Men's javelin throw F42/44
Bronze	Wang Juan	Athletics	Women's 100m T44
Bronze	Dong Hongjiao	Athletics	Women's 100m T54
Bronze	Zhou Hongzhuan	Athletics	Women's 200m T53
Bronze	Liu Miaomiao	Athletics	Women's long jump F12
Bronze	Li Chunhua	Athletics	Women's discus throw F37-38
Bronze	Zheng Baozhu	Athletics	Women's discus throw F42-46
Bronze	Yuanchao Zheng	Cycling	Men's 1 km time trial LC2
Bronze	Dong Jingping	Cycling	Women's 500m time trial LC1-2/CP 4
Bronze	Dong Jingping	Cycling	Women's individual pursuit LC1-2/CP 4
Bronze	Li Xiaodong	Judo	Men's 60 kg
Bronze	Wu Maoshun	Powerlifting	Men's 67.5 kg
Bronze	Li Bing	Powerlifting	Men's +100 kg
Bronze	Zhang Liping	Powerlifting	Women's 75 kg
Bronze	Dong Chao	Shooting	Men's 50m rifle 3x40
Bronze	Zhang Cuiping	Shooting	Women's 50m rifle 3x20 SH1
Bronze	Xiaoming Xion	Swimming	Men's 50m freestyle S9
Bronze	Li Hanhua	Swimming	Men's 100m freestyle S3
Bronze	Yuanrun Yang	Swimming	Men's 100m freestyle S6
Bronze	Du Jianping	Swimming	Men's 200m freestyle S3
Bronze	Wang Jiachao	Swimming	Men's 400m freestyle S8
Bronze	Zeng Huabin	Swimming	Men's 50m backstroke S4
Bronze	Tang Yuan	Swimming	Men's 100m backstroke S6
Bronze	He Junquan	Swimming	Men's 50m butterfly S5
Bronze	Mang Pei	Swimming	Men's 50m butterfly S7
Bronze	Wang Xiaofu	Swimming	Men's 100m butterfly S8
Bronze	Guo Zhi	Swimming	Men's 100m butterfly S9
Bronze	Xu Qing	Swimming	Men's 200m individual medley SM6
Bronze	Guo Zhi; Wang Xiaofu; Wei Yanpeng; Xiaoming Xiong	Swimming	Men's 4 × 100 m freestyle relay
Bronze	Xia Jiangbo	Swimming	Women's 50m backstroke S3
Bronze	Jiang Fuying	Swimming	Women's 100m backstroke S6
Bronze	Jin Xiaoqin	Swimming	Women's 100m butterfly S8
Bronze	Wang Shuai	Swimming	Women's 100m butterfly S10
Bronze	Feng Panfeng; Gao Yanming; Zhao Ping	Table tennis	Men's team class 3
Bronze	Zhang Xiaoling	Table tennis	Women's singles class 8
Bronze	Hou Chunxiao	Table tennis	Women's singles class 10
Bronze	Ye Hua	Wheelchair fencing	Women's foil B

Medals by date
Day	Date	Gold medal	Silver medal	Bronze medal	Total
Day 1	7th	5	4	6	15
Day 2	8th	3	6	4	13
Day 3	9th	8	11	6	25
Day 4	10th	8	7	8	23
Day 5	11th	9	10	2	21
Day 6	12th	5	4	3	12
Day 7	13th	12	4	2	18
Day 8	14th	14	8	13	35
Day 9	15th	17	6	5	28
Day 10	16th	7	7	4	18
Day 11	17th	2	2	0	4
Total		89	68	53	210

== Sports ==
=== Archery ===
==== Men ====
Athlete	Event	Ranking round		Round of 32	Round of 16	Quarterfinals	Semifinals	Finals	
Athlete	Event	Score	Seed	Opposition score	Opposition score	Opposition score	Opposition score	Opposition score	Rank
Cheng Changjie	Men's individual recurve W1/W2	626	5	Bulyk (POL); W 104-88	Mat Zin (MAS); W 108-103	Gilbert (FRA); W 99-93	Ozen (TUR); W 112-98	Vitale (ITA); W 108-104	1st place, gold medalist(s)
Chen Yegang	Men's individual recurve standing	628	2	Bye	Kopiy (UKR); W 100-94	Lyocsa (SVK); W 98-95	Baatarjav (MGL); L 98=105	Esposito (ITA); W 98-93	3rd place, bronze medalist(s)
Dong Zhi	Men's individual recurve standing	625	3	Bye	Lezanski (POL); W 108-102	Baatarjav (MGL); L 104-106	did not advance		
Zhu Weiliang	Men's individual recurve standing	591	16	An (KOR); L 95-95	did not advance				

==== Women ====
Athlete	Event	Ranking round		Round of 32	Round of 16	Quarterfinals	Semifinals	Finals	
Athlete	Event	Score	Seed	Opposition score	Opposition score	Opposition score	Opposition score	Opposition score	Rank
Wang Li	Women's individual compound	551	8	—N/a		Brown (GBR); L 81-107	did not advance		
Cao Xuerong	Women's individual recurve W1/W2	554	7	Bye	Schultz (GER); W 79-65	Fu (CHN); L 81-99	did not advance		
Fu Hongzhi	Women's individual recurve W1/W2	600	2	Bye	Critchlow-Smith (GBR); W 97-75	Cao (CHN); W 99-81	Nakanishi (JPN); W 82-76	Girismen (TUR); L 85-91	2nd place, silver medalist(s)
Xiao Yanhong	Women's individual recurve W1/W2	611 WR	1	Bye	Droste (GER); W 91-66	Saitoh (JPN); W 96-90	Girismen (TUR); L 93-95	Nakanishi (JPN); W 98-94	3rd place, bronze medalist(s)
Gao Fangxia	Women's individual recurve standing	593	2	Bye	Lucas (GBR); W 89-89	Tzika (GRE); W 106-83	Olejnik (POL); W 98-85	Lee H S (KOR); L 92-103	2nd place, silver medalist(s)
Wang Yanhong	Women's individual recurve standing	495	20	Carmichael (USA); L 82-89	did not advance				
Yan Huilian	Women's individual recurve standing	534	16	Bukanska (POL); W 98-96	Lee H S (KOR); L 97-101	did not advance			

==== Teams ====
Athlete	Event	Ranking round		Round of 32	Round of 16	Quarterfinals	Semifinals	Finals	
Athlete	Event	Score	Seed	Opposition score	Opposition score	Opposition score	Opposition score	Opposition score	Rank
Chen Yegang; Cheng Changjie; Dong Zhi	Men's team recurve	1879	3	—N/a		Poland (POL); W 202-191	Italy (ITA); W 208-201	South Korea (KOR); L 206-209	2nd place, silver medalist(s)
Fu Hongzhi; Gao Fangxia; Xiao Yanhong	Women's team recurve	1804 WR	1	—N/a		Germany (GER); W 187-165	Poland (POL); W 194-178	South Korea (KOR); W 205-177	1st place, gold medalist(s)

=== Athletics ===
==== Men's track ====
Athlete	Class	Event	Heats		Semifinal		Final	
Athlete	Class	Event	Result	Rank	Result	Rank	Result	Rank
Che Mian	T36	100m	—N/a				12.46	6
Che Mian	T36	200m	—N/a				25.34	3rd place, bronze medalist(s)
Che Mian	T36	400m	—N/a				55.70	3rd place, bronze medalist(s)
Cui Yanfeng	T54	800m	1:37.40	5 Q	1:34.93	4 Q	1:37.41	4
Fu Xinhan	T35	100m	—N/a				12.55	2nd place, silver medalist(s)
Han Guiming	T46	Marathon	—N/a				2:33:57	4
He Chengen	T36	400m	—N/a				58.29	5
He Chengen	T36	800m	—N/a				2:14.76	2nd place, silver medalist(s)
Li Huzhao	T53	400m	52.50	5 Q	—N/a		48.43	2nd place, silver medalist(s)
Li Huzhao	T53	800m	1:38.34	2 Q	—N/a		1:36.30 WR	1st place, gold medalist(s)
Li Jun	T54	100m	14.41	6 Q	—N/a		15.21	8
Li Jun	T54	200m	25.55	6 q	—N/a		25.86	5
Li Jun	T54	Marathon	—N/a				1:32:33	25
Li Qiang	T12	100m	11.23	5 q	11.10	4 Q	11.02	4
Li Qiang	T12	200m	22.85	6 Q	22.51	6 B	22.64	6
Li Qiang	T12	400m	50.50	5 q	51.20	6	did not advance	
Li Yansong	T12	200m	22.63	5 Q	22.47	4 Q	22.21	2nd place, silver medalist(s)
Li Yansong	T12	400m	49.75	1 Q	50.73	3 Q	DSQ	
Liu Xiangkun	T11	100m	11.52	6 Q	11.46	4 Q	11.57	4
Liu Xiangkun	T11	200m	24.08	8 q	24.78	10	did not advance	
Lu Jianming	T37	800m	—N/a				2:10.26	5
Ma Yuxi	T37	100m	12.14	2 Q	—N/a		11.90	2nd place, silver medalist(s)
Ma Yuxi	T37	200m	24.52	3 Q	—N/a		24.48	3rd place, bronze medalist(s)
Qi Shun	T12	Marathon	—N/a				2:30.32 WR	1st place, gold medalist(s)
Qin Ning	T46	800m	2:01.08	12	did not advance			
Qiu Jianfeng	T46	100m	11.32	10	did not advance			
Wu Xiang	T11	100m	11.88	16	did not advance			
Wu Xiang	T11	200m	24.96	18	did not advance			
Xiao Jialin	T54	400m	51.69	25	did not advance			
Xiao Jialin	T54	Marathon	—N/a				1:40:42	33
Xu Ran	T36	100m	—N/a				12.40	4
Xu Ran	T36	200m	—N/a				25.54	5
Xu Zhao	T46	100m	11.10	4 Q	—N/a		11.26	4
Yang Chen	T38	200m	23.19	4 Q	—N/a		22.99	5
Yang Sen	T35	100m	—N/a				12.29 WR	1st place, gold medalist(s)
Yang Yuqing	T12	100m	11.11	3 Q	10.95	3 Q	10.96	3rd place, bronze medalist(s)
Yang Yuqing	T12	200m	22.44	4 Q	22.27	3 Q	22.39	3rd place, bronze medalist(s)
Yu Shiran	T53	100m	14.81 PR	1 Q	—N/a		15.09	3rd place, bronze medalist(s)
Yu Shiran	T53	200m	26.79	1 Q	—N/a		26.64	1st place, gold medalist(s)
Yu Shiran	T53	400m	56.80	18	did not advance			
Zhang Lixin	T54	200m	24.18 WR	1 Q	—N/a		24.34	1st place, gold medalist(s)
Zhang Lixin	T54	400m	46.75 PR	1 Q	48.52	3 Q	45.07	1st place, gold medalist(s)
Zhang Lixin	T54	800m	DNF		did not advance			
Zhang Zhen	T11	1500m	4:14.85	1 Q	—N/a		4:10.05	1st place, gold medalist(s)
Zhao Ji	T54	100m	14.89	10	did not advance			
Zhao Ji	T54	800m	1:41.57	22	did not advance			
Zhao Ji	T54	Marathon	—N/a				1:40:00	32
Zhao Xu	T46	200m	23.67	17	did not advance			
Zhou Wenjun	T38	100m	—N/a				11.14	2nd place, silver medalist(s)
Zhou Wenjun	T38	200m	23.10	3 Q	—N/a		22.38	2nd place, silver medalist(s)
Zhou Wenjun	T38	400m	—N/a				1:27.97	7
Zong Kai	T54	100m	14.25	3 Q	—N/a		14.27	4
Zong Kai	T54	200m	25.67	8 Q	—N/a		DSQ	
Li Qiang; Li Yansong; Liu Xiangkun; Yang Yuqing	T11-13	4 × 100 m relay	42.80 WR	1 Q	—N/a		42.75 WR	1st place, gold medalist(s)
Che Mian; Ma Yuxi; Yang Chen; Zhou Wenjun	T35–38	4 × 100 m relay	—N/a				45.00	2nd place, silver medalist(s)
Li Huzhao; Zhang Lixin; Zhao Ji; Zong Kai	T53–54	4 × 100 m relay	49.89 WR	1 Q	—N/a		49.90	1st place, gold medalist(s)
Cui Yanfeng; Li Huzhao; Zhang Lixin; Zhao Ji	T53–54	4 × 400 m relay	3:08.80 WR	1 Q	—N/a		3:05.67 WR	1st place, gold medalist(s)

==== Men's field ====
Athlete	Class	Event	Final		
Athlete	Class	Event	Result	Points	Rank
Chen Hongjie	F44/46	High jump	1.96	980	3rd place, bronze medalist(s)
Du Jun	F44/46	High jump	1.93	965	4
Fan Chengcheng	F40	Shot put	9.59	-	9
Fan Liang	F53–54	Discus throw	31.08 WR	1058	1st place, gold medalist(s)
Fan Liang	F53–54	Javelin throw	26.06	988	7
Fu Xinhan	F35–36	Discus throw	39.59	827	10
Fu Xinhan	F35–36	Shot put	12.20	844	8
Gao Changlong	F42/44	Javelin throw	55.30	1015	3rd place, bronze medalist(s)
Gao Mingjie	F42/44	Javelin throw	57.60 WR	1057	1st place, gold medalist(s)
Guo Wei	F35–36	Discus throw	54.13	1131	1st place, gold medalist(s)
Guo Wei	F35–36	Javelin throw	56.07 WR	1283	1st place, gold medalist(s)
Guo Wei	F35–36	Shot put	16.22 WR	1122	1st place, gold medalist(s)
Ha Silao	F42/44	Javelin throw	50.73	931	6
Ha Silao	F44	Discus throw	42.80	792	8
Li Duan	F11	Long jump	6.61	-	1st place, gold medalist(s)
Li Duan	F11	Triple jump	13.71 WR	-	1st place, gold medalist(s)
Li Kangyong	F46	Long jump	6.61 SB	-	3rd place, bronze medalist(s)
Li Liming	F57–58	Javelin throw	43.59 SB	925	9
Ma Yuxi	F37–38	Long jump	6.19	1076	3rd place, bronze medalist(s)
Wang Lezheng	F42	Discus throw	42.95	-	3rd place, bronze medalist(s)
Wang Lezheng	F42	Shot put	13.63	-	4
Wang Qiuhong	F42/44	Long jump	6.31	975	6
Wang Wenbo	F35–36	Discus throw	38.98	1116	2nd place, silver medalist(s)
Wang Wenbo	F35–36	Javelin throw	32.49	878	6
Wang Wenbo	F35–36	Shot put	12.13 SB	972	4
Wu Yancong	F44/46	High jump	1.84	920	7
Wu Yancong	F46	Long jump	6.42	-	6
Xia Dong	F37-38	Discus throw	51.65 SB	1003	3rd place, bronze medalist(s)
Xia Dong	F37-38	Javelin throw	57.81 WR	1201	1st place, gold medalist(s)
Xia Dong	F37-38	Shot put	16.60 WR	1104	1st place, gold medalist(s)
Xu Chongyao	F57–58	Discus throw	48.75 SB	913	9
Xu Chongyao	F57–58	Javelin throw	45.62 SB	968	7
Zhang Xuelong	F37–38	Discus throw	43.61	847	10
Zhang Xuelong	F37–38	Javelin throw	50.24	1044	2nd place, silver medalist(s)
Zhang Yingbin	F55-56	Javelin throw	32.70 SB	994	2nd place, silver medalist(s)
Zheng Weihai	F57–58	Discus throw	49.09	1052	2nd place, silver medalist(s)
Zhu Pengkai	F11–12	Javelin throw	63.07 WR	1114	1st place, gold medalist(s)
Zhu Pengkai	P12	Pentathlon	5.99	584	10

==== Women's track ====
Athlete	Class	Event	Heats		Final	
Athlete	Class	Event	Result	Rank	Result	Rank
Dong Hongjiao	T54	100m	16.27	3 Q	16.24	3rd place, bronze medalist(s)
Dong Hongjiao	T54	400m	55.93	6 Q	55.83	5
Huang Lisha	T53	100m	16.29 PR	1 Q	16.22 WR	1st place, gold medalist(s)
Huang Lisha	T53	200m	29.84	1 Q	29.17 WR	1st place, gold medalist(s)
Liu Wenjun	T54	100m	16.20	2 Q	16.20	2nd place, silver medalist(s)
Liu Wenjun	T54	800m	1:57.81	8 Q	1:51.85	7
Liu Wenjun	T54	Marathon	—N/a		1:40:12	6
Wang Fang	T36	100m	—N/a		13.82 WR	1st place, gold medalist(s)
Wang Fang	T36	200m	—N/a		29.57	1st place, gold medalist(s)
Wang Juan	T44	100m	13.75	2 Q	13.73	3rd place, bronze medalist(s)
Wu Chunmiao	T11	100m	12.41	1 Q	12.31 PR	1st place, gold medalist(s)
Wu Chunmiao	T11	200m	25.59	2 Q	25.40	2nd place, silver medalist(s)
Xin Sun	T12	200m	26.65	9	did not advance	
Xin Sun	T12	400m	58.79	4 q	1:02.46	4
Zhang Ting	T54	100m	16.42	4 Q	16.61	5
Zhang Ting	T54	200m	29.87	4 Q	29.00	4
Zhou Hongzhuan	T53	200m	30.52	2 Q	30.15	3rd place, bronze medalist(s)
Zhou Hongzhuan	T53	400m	57.68	2 Q	55.28	2nd place, silver medalist(s)
Zhou Hongzhuan	T53	800m	—N/a		1:57.25	1st place, gold medalist(s)
Dong Hongjiao; Huang Lisha; Liu Wenjun; Zhang Ting	T53–54	4 × 100 m relay	—N/a		57.61 WR	1st place, gold medalist(s)

==== Women's field ====
Athlete	Class	Event	Final		
Athlete	Class	Event	Result	Points	Rank
Bai Xuhong	F35–36	Discus throw	23.42	975	5
Bai Xuhong	F35–36	Shot put	6.61	708	10
Chen Liping	F54–56	Discus throw	15.82	937	5
Chen Liping	F54–56	Javelin throw	15.68	1071	4
Chen Liping	F54–56	Shot put	5.58	899	10
Dong Feixia	F54–56	Discus throw	24.59	937	4
Dong Feixia	F54–56	Shot put	6.29	756	14
Jia Qianqian	F35–38	Javelin throw	25.02	1053	6
Jia Qianqian	F37–38	Discus throw	27.40	933	5
Jia Qianqian	F37–38	Shot put	10.11	986	7
Jin Yajuan	F42–46	Shot put	12.14	998	4
Li Chunhua	F37–38	Discus throw	27.95	951	3rd place, bronze medalist(s)
Liu Miaomiao	F12	Long jump	5.74	-	3rd place, bronze medalist(s)
Menggenjimisu	F40	Discus throw	28.04 WR	-	1st place, gold medalist(s)
Menggenjimisu	F40	Shot put	8.48 SB	-	2nd place, silver medalist(s)
Mi Na	F37–38	Discus throw	33.67 WR	1146	1st place, gold medalist(s)
Mi Na	F37–38	Shot put	11.58	1129 WR	1st place, gold medalist(s)
Qing Suping	F57–58	Javelin throw	22.71	1140	1st place, gold medalist(s)
Tang Hongxia	F12–13	Discus throw	33.88	796	6
Tang Hongxia	F12–13	Shot put	12.69	1017	1st place, gold medalist(s)
Wang Jun	F42–46	Discus throw	36.99	1216 WR	1st place, gold medalist(s)
Wang Juan	F44	Long jump	4.61	-	4
Wang Ting	F54–56	Discus throw	17.04	1010	2nd place, silver medalist(s)
Wang Ting	F54–56	Javelin throw	13.96 SB	953	10
Wu Qing	F35–36	Discus throw	25.80 WR	1199	1st place, gold medalist(s)
Wu Qing	F35–36	Shot put	9.13	1025	2nd place, silver medalist(s)
Wu Qing	F35–38	Javelin throw	28.84	1662 WR	1st place, gold medalist(s)
Xu Qiuping	F37–38	Shot put	10.21	996	6
Yang Liwan	F54–56	Javelin throw	18.24 SB	1027	6
Yang Liwan	F54–56	Shot put	7.94 SB	954	7
Yang Yue	F42–46	Discus throw	42.38 WR	1122	2nd place, silver medalist(s)
Yao Juan	F42–46	Javelin throw	40.51 WR	1106	1st place, gold medalist(s)
Zhang Haiyuan	F42	Long jump	3.44	-	5
Zhang Liangmin	F12–13	Discus throw	40.35	948	2nd place, silver medalist(s)
Zhang Liangmin	F12–13	Shot put	10.91	874	4
Zheng Baozhu	F42–46	Discus throw	33.19 SB	1091	3rd place, bronze medalist(s)
Zheng Baozhu	F42–46	Javelin throw	31.05 PR	1056	4
Zheng Baozhu	F42–46	Shot put	10.06	1078 WR	1st place, gold medalist(s)
Zhong Yongyuan	F42–46	Javelin throw	28.23	960	8
Zhong Yongyuan	F42–46	Shot put	9.80	1051	2nd place, silver medalist(s)

=== Boccia ===
==== Individual events ====
Athlete	Event	Preliminaries			Quarterfinals	Semifinals	Final	
Athlete	Event	Opponent	Opposition Score	Rank	Opposition Score	Opposition Score	Opposition Score	Rank
Wang Yi	Mixed individual BC1	Beltran (ESP)	L 0-6	2 Q	Moran (IRL); W 6-5	Fernandes (POR); L 4-5	Shelly (IRL); L 2-6	4
Wang Yi	Mixed individual BC1	Villano (ARG)	W 6-1	2 Q	Moran (IRL); W 6-5	Fernandes (POR); L 4-5	Shelly (IRL); L 2-6	4
Wang Yi	Mixed individual BC1	Mawji (CAN)	W 3-2	2 Q	Moran (IRL); W 6-5	Fernandes (POR); L 4-5	Shelly (IRL); L 2-6	4
Wang Yi	Mixed individual BC1	Hawker (USA)	W 8-1	2 Q	Moran (IRL); W 6-5	Fernandes (POR); L 4-5	Shelly (IRL); L 2-6	4
Zhang Qi	Mixed individual BC1	Fernandes (POR)	L 5-6	3	did not advance			
Zhang Qi	Mixed individual BC1	Vaquerizo (ESP)	L 3-4	3	did not advance			
Zhang Qi	Mixed individual BC1	Leung M Y (HKG)	W 10-1	3	did not advance			
Zhang Qi	Mixed individual BC1	Sarela (FIN)	W 3-2	3	did not advance			
Cao Fei	Mixed individual BC2	Cortez (ARG)	L 2-5	2	did not advance			
Cao Fei	Mixed individual BC2	Connolly (IRL)	W 5-0	2	did not advance			
Cao Fei	Mixed individual BC2	Leglice (ARG)	W 4-2	2	did not advance			
Yan Zhiqiang	Mixed individual BC2	Cordero (ESP)	L 0-6	2	did not advance			
Yan Zhiqiang	Mixed individual BC2	McLeod (CAN)	W 5-1	2	did not advance			
Yan Zhiqiang	Mixed individual BC2	Koivuniemi (FIN)	W 8-1	2	did not advance			
Shen Cong	Mixed individual BC3	Park K W (KOR)	L 2-5	2	did not advance			
Shen Cong	Mixed individual BC3	Martino (CAN)	W 5-4	2	did not advance			
Shen Cong	Mixed individual BC3	Punsnit (THA)	L 4-5	2	did not advance			
Zhu Heqiao	Mixed individual BC3	Polychronidis (GRE)	L 1-11	4	did not advance			
Zhu Heqiao	Mixed individual BC3	Sukkarath (THA)	L 1-4	4	did not advance			
Zhu Heqiao	Mixed individual BC3	Dijkstra (NZL)	L 0-13	4	did not advance			
Zhu Jianhui	Mixed individual BC3	Shin (KOR)	L 2-3	4	did not advance			
Zhu Jianhui	Mixed individual BC3	J M Rodríguez (ESP)	L 1-6	4	did not advance			
Zhu Jianhui	Mixed individual BC3	Jackson (NZL)	L 2-4	4	did not advance			
Ni Suili	Mixed individual BC4	Leung Y W (HKG)	W 3-2	1 Q	Pinto (BRA); L 0-12	did not advance		
Ni Suili	Mixed individual BC4	Durkovic (SVK)	W 5-1	1 Q	Pinto (BRA); L 0-12	did not advance		
Ni Suili	Mixed individual BC4	Streharsky (SVK)	W 8-2	1 Q	Pinto (BRA); L 0-12	did not advance		
Qi Cuifang	Mixed individual BC4	E Santos (BRA)	W 8-3	1 Q	Dueso (ESP); L 2-6	did not advance		
Qi Cuifang	Mixed individual BC4	Prochazka (CZE)	W 12-0	1 Q	Dueso (ESP); L 2-6	did not advance		
Qi Cuifang	Mixed individual BC4	Desamparados Baixauli (ESP)	W 9-0	1 Q	Dueso (ESP); L 2-6	did not advance		

==== Pairs/teams events ====
Athlete	Event	Preliminaries			Quarterfinals	Semifinals	Final	
Athlete	Event	Opponent	Opposition Score	Rank	Opposition Score	Opposition Score	Opposition Score	Rank
Shen Cong; Zhu Heqiao; Zhu Jianhui	Pairs BC3	Jeong (KOR); Park K W (KOR); Shin (KOR)	L 2-9	4	did not advance			
Shen Cong; Zhu Heqiao; Zhu Jianhui	Pairs BC3	Martin (ESP); Pesquera (ESP); J M Rodríguez (ESP)	W 5-1	4	did not advance			
Shen Cong; Zhu Heqiao; Zhu Jianhui	Pairs BC3	Gauthier (CAN); Kabush (CAN); Martino (CAN)	L 2-8	4	did not advance			
Ni Suili; Qi Cuifang	Pairs BC4	Kratina (CZE); Prochazka (CZE)	L 1-8	4	did not advance			
Ni Suili; Qi Cuifang	Pairs BC4	Pereira (POR); Valentim (POR)	L 0-7	4	did not advance			
Ni Suili; Qi Cuifang	Pairs BC4	Lau Wai Yan (HKG); Leung Y W (HKG)	L 4-8	4	did not advance			
Cao Fei; Wang Yi; Yan Zhiqiang; Zhang Qi	Mixed team BC1-2	Hong Kong (HKG)	W 7-3	1 Q	Ireland (IRL); W 12-2	Great Britain (GBR); L 3-7	Spain (ESP); L 4-5	4
Cao Fei; Wang Yi; Yan Zhiqiang; Zhang Qi	Mixed team BC1-2	New Zealand (NZL)	W 8-4	1 Q	Ireland (IRL); W 12-2	Great Britain (GBR); L 3-7	Spain (ESP); L 4-5	4

=== Cycling ===
==== Men's road ====
Athlete	Event	Time	Rank
Zhang Kuidong	Men's road time trial LC1	41:10.95	15
Zhang Kuidong	Men's road race LC1/2/CP4	1:59:05	21
Zhang Lu	Men's road time trial LC3	44:02.83	11
Zhang Lu	Men's road race LC3/4/CP3	1:39:15	11
Zheng Yunchao	Men's road time trial LC2	38:30.72	8
Zheng Yunchao	Men's road race LC1/2/CP4	1:59:00	20

==== Men's track ====
Athlete	Event	Qualification		1st round		Final	
Athlete	Event	Time	Rank	Time	Rank	Opposition Time	Rank
Zhang Kuidong	Men's 1km time trial LC1	—N/a				1:10.47	2nd place, silver medalist(s)
Zhang Kuidong	Men's individual pursuit LC1	5:12.67	13	did not advance			
Zhang Lu	Men's individual pursuit LC3	4:21.75	10	did not advance			
Zheng Yuanchao	Men's 1km time trial LC2	—N/a				1:11.20	3rd place, bronze medalist(s)
Zheng Yuanchao	Men's individual pursuit LC2	5:13.42	6	did not advance			
Zhang Kuidong; Zhang Lu; Zheng Yuanchao	Men's team sprint	51.233	2 Q	—N/a		Great Britain (GBR); L 50.480	2nd place, silver medalist(s)

==== Women's road ====
Athlete	Event	Time	Rank
Dong Jingping	Women's road time trial LC1/2/CP4	44:08.71	6
Niu Zhifeng	Women's road time trial LC3/4/CP3	48:45.64	7
Qi Tang	Women's road time trial LC3/4/CP3	47:23.63	5
Ye Yaping	Women's road time trial LC1/2/CP4	43:58.22	5
Zhou Jufang	Women's road time trial LC1/2/CP4	39:30.84	3rd place, bronze medalist(s)

==== Women's track ====
Athlete	Event	Qualification		1st round		Final	
Athlete	Event	Time	Rank	Time	Rank	Opposition Time	Rank
Dong Jingping	Women's time trial LC1-2/CP4	—N/a				0.36.9	3rd place, bronze medalist(s)
Dong Jingping	Women's individual pursuit LC1-2/CP4	3:49.130	3 q	—N/a		Ye Y (CHN); W 3:49.754	3rd place, bronze medalist(s)
Niu Zhifeng	Women's time trial LC3–4/CP3	—N/a				0.49.0	10
Niu Zhifeng	Women's individual pursuit LC3–4/CP3	4:32.381	6	did not advance			
Qi Tang	Women's time trial LC3–4/CP3	—N/a				0.45.6	5
Qi Tang	Women's individual pursuit LC3–4/CP3	4:27.115	5	did not advance			
Ye Yaping	Women's time trial LC1–2/CP4	—N/a				0.36.1	2nd place, silver medalist(s)
Ye Yaping	Women's individual pursuit LC1-2/CP4	3:51.508	4 q	—N/a		Dong J (CHN); L 3:54.825	4
Zhou Jufang	Women's time trial LC1–2/CP4	—N/a				0.36.9	4
Zhou Jufang	Women's individual pursuit LC1–2/CP4	4:00.504	6	did not advance			

=== Equestrian ===
Athlete	Horse	Event	Total	
Athlete	Horse	Event	Score	Rank
Peng Yulian	Furstendonner AF	Mixed individual championship test grade II	64.545	8
Peng Yulian	Furstendonner AF	Mixed individual freestyle test grade II	66.729	6

=== Football 5-a-side ===
The men's football 5-a-side team won a silver medal in the football 5-a-side

==== Players ====
- Chen Shanyong
- Li Xiaoqiang
- Wang Yafeng
- Wang Zhoubin
- Wei Zheng
- Xia Zheng
- Yang Xinqiang
- Yu Yutan
- Zhang Qiang
- Zheng Wenfa

==== Tournament ====
Group stage

7 September 2008
11:30

China	3–0	Great Britain

Olympic Green Hockey Field
9 September 2008
13:00

Argentina	0–1	China

Olympic Green Hockey Field
11 September 2008
11:00

China	1–0	South Korea

Olympic Green Hockey Field
Attendance: 1,995
Referee: Ricardo Torino (ARG)
13 September 2008
9:00

Spain	0–1	China

Olympic Green Hockey Field
15 September 2008
13:00

China	1–1	Brazil

Olympic Green Hockey Field

Gold medal match

17 September 2008
13:30

Brazil	2–1	China

Olympic Green Hockey Field
Referee: Ilias Mastoras (GRE)

=== Football 7-a-side ===
The men's football 7-a-side team didn't win any medals; they were 8th out of 8 teams.

==== Players ====
- Dong Xinliang
- Fan Zhichao
- He Jinghua
- Lang Yunlong
- Li Chuan
- Liu Bo
- Wu Gang
- Xu Guojun
- Yang Wenshun
- Yang Ye
- Zhu Xu
- Zhuge Bin

==== Tournament ====
Group stage

8 September 2008
9:00

Russia	6–0	China

Olympic Green Hockey Field
10 September 2008
15:45

China	0–8	Brazil

Olympic Green Hockey Field
12 September 2008
11:15

Netherlands	8-1	China

Olympic Green Hockey Field

7th-8th place match

16 September 2008
9:00

China	2-10	Great Britain

Olympic Green Hockey Field
Attendance: 4,325
Referee: Fang Aijun (CHN)

=== Goalball ===
==== Men's team ====
The men's goalball team won the gold medal after defeating Lithuania.

Players

- Bao Daolei
- Cai Changgui
- Chen Liangliang
- Du Jinran
- Yang Chunhong
- Yao Yongquan

Group B Matches

7 September 2008

United States	3 – 13	China

Beijing Institute of Technology Gymnasium
8 September 2008

China	13 – 8	Sweden

Beijing Institute of Technology Gymnasium
9 September 2008

Canada	2 – 11	China

Beijing Institute of Technology Gymnasium
10 September 2008

China	14 – 4	Brazil

Beijing Institute of Technology Gymnasium
11 September 2008

Iran	8 – 6	China

Beijing Institute of Technology Gymnasium

Quarterfinals

12 September 2008

China	7 – 6	Finland

Beijing Institute of Technology Gymnasium

Semifinals

13 September 2008

United States	0 – 4	China

Beijing Institute of Technology Gymnasium

Gold medal match

14 September 2008

China	9 – 8	Lithuania

Beijing Institute of Technology Gymnasium

==== Women's team ====
The women's team won a silver medal after being defeated by reigning champions United States in the gold medal match.

Players

- Chen Fengqing
- Fan Feifei
- Lin Shan
- Wang Ruixue
- Wang Shasha
- Xu Juan

Preliminary matches

7 September 2008

China	5 – 3	Brazil

Beijing Institute of Technology Gymnasium
8 September 2008

Germany	0 – 3	China

Beijing Institute of Technology Gymnasium
9 September 2008

China	4 – 0	United States

Beijing Institute of Technology Gymnasium
10 September 2008

Sweden	3 – 5	China

Beijing Institute of Technology Gymnasium
11 September 2008

China	3 – 1	Japan

Beijing Institute of Technology Gymnasium
12 September 2008

Denmark	0 – 0	China

Beijing Institute of Technology Gymnasium
13 September 2008

China	1 – 0	Canada

Beijing Institute of Technology Gymnasium

Semifinals

14 September 2008

Sweden	1 – 1 (2-3 OT)	China

Beijing Institute of Technology Gymnasium

Gold medal match

15 September 2008

China	5 – 6	United States

Beijing Institute of Technology Gymnasium

=== Judo ===
==== Men ====
Athlete	Event	First Round	Quarterfinals	Semifinals	Repechage round 1	Repechage round 2	Final/ Bronze medal contest
Athlete	Event	Opposition Result	Opposition Result	Opposition Result	Opposition Result	Opposition Result	Opposition Result
Li Xiaodong	Men's 60kg	Araujo (BRA); W 0101-0001	Quilter (GBR); W 0000–0001	Rahmati (IRI); L 0000-1000	—N/a		Shakhmanov (RUS); W 1000-0000 (bronze)
Wang Song	Men's +100kg	Bye	Dewall (USA); W 0111-0000	Papp (HUN); W 1110-0111	—N/a		Zakiyev (AZE); L 0000-1000 (silver)
Xu Zhilin	Men's 73kg	Bye	Aliyev (AZE); W 1001-0000	Sydorenko (UKR); W 0020-0000	—N/a		Avila (MEX); L 0000-1000 (silver)

==== Women ====
Athlete	Event	First Round	Quarterfinals	Semifinals	Repechage round 1	Repechage round 2	Final/ Bronze medal contest
Athlete	Event	Opposition Result	Opposition Result	Opposition Result	Opposition Result	Opposition Result	Opposition Result
Cui Na	Women's 52kg	Bye		M Ferreira (BRA); W 0010-0001	—N/a		Aurieres-Martinet (FRA); W 0103-0011 (gold)
Guo Hua Ping	Women's 48kg	Bye	L Garcia (ESP); W 0200-0000	Potapova (RUS); W 0110-0001	—N/a		Cardoso (BRA); W 1010-0000 (gold)
Wang Lijing	Women's 57kg	Buzmakova (RUS); W 1000-0000	—N/a	Merenciano (ESP); W 1000-0000	—N/a		Brussig (GER); W 1014-0000 (gold)
Yuan Yanping	Women's +70kg	Kalyanova (RUS); W 1000-0000	—N/a	Bouazoug (ALG); W 1010-0000	—N/a		D Silva (BRA); W 1010-0000 (gold)
Zhou Qian	Women's 63kg	Bye	Soazo (VEN); L 0001-1000	—N/a		Batsukh (MGL); W 1000-0000	Kazakova (RUS); L 0010-1010

=== Powerlifting ===
==== Men ====
Athlete	Event	Result	Rank
Cai Huichao	90kg	235.0	1st place, gold medalist(s)
Li Bing	+100kg	225.0	3rd place, bronze medalist(s)
Liu Lei	75kg	225.0	1st place, gold medalist(s)
Qi Dong	100kg	247.5 WR	1st place, gold medalist(s)
Wang Jian	56kg	180.0	5
Wu Guojing	48kg	175.0	1st place, gold medalist(s)
Wu Maoshun	67.5kg	200.0	3rd place, bronze medalist(s)
Zhang Haidong	82.5kg	230.0	1st place, gold medalist(s)

==== Women ====
Athlete	Event	Result	Rank
Bian Jianxin	60kg	135.0 WR	1st place, gold medalist(s)
Cui Zhe	40kg	95.0	2nd place, silver medalist(s)
Fu Taoying	67.5kg	145.5 WR	1st place, gold medalist(s)
Li Ruifang	+82.5kg	165.0	1st place, gold medalist(s)
Shi Shanshan	48kg	97.5	5
Xiao Cuijuan	44kg	100.0	1st place, gold medalist(s)
Zhang Liping	75kg	132.5	3rd place, bronze medalist(s)
Zuo Jue	82.5kg	137.5	2nd place, silver medalist(s)

=== Rowing ===
Athlete	Event	Heats		Repechage		Final	
Athlete	Event	Time	Rank	Time	Rank	Time	Rank
Tan Yeteng	Men's single sculls	5:33.06	4	5:45.79	1 FA	5:42.25	4
Zhang Jinhong	Women's single sculls	6:11.02	4	6:43.78	3 FA	6:40.81	5
Zhou Yangjing; Shan Zilong	Mixed double sculls	4:14.67	1 Q FA	—N/a		4:20.69	1st place, gold medalist(s)
Dong Hongyan; Gao Wenwen; Hao Tongtu; Li Ming; Lin Cuizhi	Mixed coxed four	3:37.38	3 Q FA	—N/a		3:44.15	5

=== Sailing ===
Athlete	Event	Race										Score	Rank
Athlete	Event	1	2	3	4	5	6	7	8	9	10	Score	Rank
Hailiang Jia; Xiujuan Yang	Two Person Keelboat – SKUD 18	1	4	7	7	5	6	(8)	4	(8)	1	51	4

=== Shooting ===
==== Men ====
Athlete	Event	Qualification		Final		
Athlete	Event	Score	Rank	Score	Total	Rank
Dong Chao	Men's 10m air rifle standing SH1	585	12	did not advance		
Dong Chao	Men's 50m rifle 3 positions SH1	1157	3 Q	96.5	1253.5	3rd place, bronze medalist(s)
Dong Chao	Mixed 50m rifle prone SH1	586	8 Q	103.3	689.3	3rd place, bronze medalist(s)
Gou Dingchao	Men's 10m air rifle standing SH1	591	5	100.5	691.5	6
Gou Dingchao	Men's 50m rifle 3 positions SH1	1139	8 Q	98.1	1237.1	8
Huang Wei	Mixed 25m pistol SH1	567	7 Q	197.5	764.5	5
Huang Wei	Mixed 50m pistol SH1	532	7 Q	89.5	621.5	8
Huang Wei	Mixed 10m air rifle prone SH1	596	23	did not advance		
Li Jianfei	Men's 10m air pistol SH1	567	5 Q	95.2	662.2	6
Li Jianfei	Mixed 25m pistol SH1	573	3 Q	201.3	774.3	2nd place, silver medalist(s)
Li Jianfei	Mixed 50m pistol SH1	531	9	did not advance		
Liu Jie	Mixed 10m air rifle prone SH2	599	6 Q	103.9	702.9	8
Liu Jie	Mixed 10m air rifle standing SH2	597	4 Q	101.6	698.6	8
Ni Hedong	Men's 10m air pistol SH1	562	11	did not advance		
Ni Hedong	Mixed 25m pistol SH1	551	17	did not advance		
Ru Decheng	Men's 10m air pistol SH1	566	6 Q	96.8	662.8	5
Ru Decheng	Mixed 50m pistol SH1	535	5	92.0	627.0	4

==== Women ====
Athlete	Event	Qualification		Final		
Athlete	Event	Score	Rank	Score	Total	Rank
Lin Haiyan	Women's 10m air pistol SH1	374	1 Q	93.7	467.7	1st place, gold medalist(s)
Wang Hongzhi	Mixed 10m air rifle prone SH1	595	28	did not advance		
Wang Hongzhi	Mixed 50m rifle prone SH1	578	31	did not advance		
Wang Tingting	Women's 10m air rifle standing SH1	378	16	did not advance		
Wang Tingting	Women's 50m rifle 3 positions SH1	554	10	did not advance		
Yuan Hongxiang	Mixed 10m air rifle prone SH2	595	18	did not advance		
Yuan Hongxiang	Mixed 10m air rifle standing SH2	596	11	did not advance		
Zhang Cuiping	Women's 10m air rifle standing SH1	383	13	did not advance		
Zhang Cuiping	Women's 50m rifle 3 positions SH1	575	2 Q	93.6	668.6	3rd place, bronze medalist(s)
Zhang Cuiping	Mixed 10m air rifle prone SH1	600	1 Q	104.4	704.4	2nd place, silver medalist(s)
Zhang Cuiping	Mixed 50m rifle prone SH1	590	3 Q	102.9	692.9	2nd place, silver medalist(s)
Zhang Nan	Women's 50m rifle 3 positions SH1	564	8 Q	91.3	655.3	8

=== Swimming ===
==== Men ====
Athlete	Class	Event	Heats		Final	
Athlete	Class	Event	Result	Rank	Result	Rank
Deng Sanbo	SB11	100m breaststroke	1:21.29	7 Q	1:18.81	6
Du Jianping	S3	50m backstroke	49.01 WR	2 Q	44.31 WR	1st place, gold medalist(s)
Du Jianping	S3	50m freestyle	52.70	4 Q	44.19	2nd place, silver medalist(s)
Du Jianping	S3	100m freestyle	1:42.95	1 Q	1:35.21	1st place, gold medalist(s)
Du Jianping	S3	200m freestyle	—N/a		3:27.82	3rd place, bronze medalist(s)
Gao Nan	S7	100m backstroke	1:18.01	7 Q	1:17.34	6
Gao Nan	S7	50m butterfly	35.62	8	did not advance	
Gao Nan	SM7	200m individual medley	2:55.12	5 Q	2:51.52	4
Guo Jun	S8	50m freestyle	27.87	4 Q	27.46	4
Guo Jun	S8	100m freestyle	1:02.29	9	did not advance	
Guo Zhi	S9	100m backstroke	1:05.75	3 Q	1:03.59	2nd place, silver medalist(s)
Guo Zhi	S9	100m butterfly	1:00.38	2 Q	1:00.11	3rd place, bronze medalist(s)
Guo Zhi	S9	50m freestyle	25.69	1 Q	25.51	2nd place, silver medalist(s)
Guo Zhi	S9	100m freestyle	56.24 PR	1 Q	56.13	2nd place, silver medalist(s)
Guo Zhi	S9	400m freestyle	4:47.47	13	did not advance	
Guo Zhi	SM9	200m individual medley	DSQ		did not advance	
He Junquan	S5	50m backstroke	35.04 WR	1 Q	35.43	2nd place, silver medalist(s)
He Junquan	S5	50m butterfly	37.41	2 Q	37.07	3rd place, bronze medalist(s)
He Junquan	S5	50m freestyle	34.89	4 Q	34.65	5
He Junquan	SM5	200m individual medley	3:05.15	2 Q	3:00.92	2nd place, silver medalist(s)
Li Hanhua	S3	50m backstroke	55.86	4 Q	54.42	4
Li Hanhua	S3	50m freestyle	50.13	3 Q	47.15	4
Li Hanhua	S3	100m freestyle	1:44.95	2 Q	1:44.22	3rd place, bronze medalist(s)
Li Hanhua	S3	200m freestyle	—N/a		3:23.40	2nd place, silver medalist(s)
Li Peng	S6	50m butterfly	33.45	6 Q	32.83	4
Li Peng	SB7	100m breaststroke	1:27.91	6 Q	1:24.43	4
Lin Furong	SB9	100m breaststroke	1:09.97	2 Q	1:09.58	2nd place, silver medalist(s)
Liu Ce	S6	50m butterfly	DSQ		did not advance	
Liu Ce	SM6	200m individual medley	3:02.28	5 Q	2:56.94	5
Ma Fei	S7	100m backstroke	1:18.10	8 Q	1:18.03	7
Ma Fei	SM7	200m individual medley	2:55.56	6 Q	2:53.42	5
Pei Mang	S7	50m butterfly	32.85	3 Q	32.47	3rd place, bronze medalist(s)
Pei Mang	S7	100m freestyle	1:11.01	10	did not advance	
Tang Yuan	S6	100m backstroke	1:20.59	2 Q	1:17.05	3rd place, bronze medalist(s)
Tang Yuan	S6	50m freestyle	30.56 PR	1 Q	30.07	2nd place, silver medalist(s)
Tang Yuan	S6	100m freestyle	1:08.84	2 Q	1:06.42	2nd place, silver medalist(s)
Tang Yuan	S6	400m freestyle	5:28.26	3 Q	5:27.16	6
Tian Hengheng	S8	100m freestyle	1:02.09	8 Q	1:01.89	8
Tian Hengheng	SB8	100m breaststroke	1:21.83	10	did not advance	
Tian Hengheng	SM8	200m individual medley	2:39.26	5 Q	DSQ	
Tian Rong	S7	50m butterfly	31.09 WR	1 Q	30.37 WR	1st place, gold medalist(s)
Tian Rong	S7	100m freestyle	1:07.61	4 Q	1:07.63	4
Tian Rong	S7	400m freestyle	5:15.99	6 Q	5:10.39	6
Tian Rong	SM7	200m individual medley	2:49.17	2 Q	2:46.20	2nd place, silver medalist(s)
Wang Jiachao	S8	100m butterfly	1:03.27	4 Q	1:03.01	4
Wang Jiachao	S8	400m freestyle	4:43.75	3 Q	4:39.48	3rd place, bronze medalist(s)
Wang Jiachao	SM8	200m individual medley	2:32.03	3 Q	2:29.71	2nd place, silver medalist(s)
Wang Renjie	S9	100m backstroke	1:09.28	8 Q	1:07.45	7
Wang Renjie	S9	50m freestyle	26.04	3 Q	26.03	4
Wang Renjie	S9	100m freestyle	59.00	13	did not advance	
Wang Xiaofu	S8	100m backstroke	DSQ		did not advance	
Wang Xiaofu	S8	100m butterfly	1:03.25	3 Q	1:01.68	3rd place, bronze medalist(s)
Wang Xiaofu	S8	50m freestyle	26.83	1 Q	26.45 WR	1st place, gold medalist(s)
Wang Xiaofu	S8	100m freestyle	59.68	3 Q	58.84 WR	1st place, gold medalist(s)
Wang Xiaofu	S8	400m freestyle	5:01.05	7 Q	4:50.04	5
Wang Xiaofu	SB8	100m breaststroke	1:15.03	3 Q	1:12.39	2nd place, silver medalist(s)
Wang Xiaofu	SM8	200m individual medley	DSQ		did not advance	
Wei Yanpeng	S8	100m butterfly	1:01.76	2 Q	1:01.49	2nd place, silver medalist(s)
Wei Yanpeng	S8	50m freestyle	28.55	6 Q	28.03	6
Xiong Xiaoming	S9	50m freestyle	25.77	2 Q	25.60	3rd place, bronze medalist(s)
Xiong Xiaoming	S9	100m freestyle	58.94	11	did not advance	
Xu Qing	S6	50m butterfly	31.89 WR	1 Q	30.79 WR	1st place, gold medalist(s)
Xu Qing	S6	50m freestyle	30.86	2 Q	29.78 WR	1st place, gold medalist(s)
Xu Qing	SM6	200m individual medley	2:52.91	3 Q	2:43.85	3rd place, bronze medalist(s)
Yang Bozun	S11	100m backstroke	1:08.40 WR	1 Q	1:07.74 WR	1st place, gold medalist(s)
Yang Bozun	S11	100m butterfly	1:06.93	4 Q	1:06.57	5
Yang Bozun	S11	50m freestyle	27.10	2 Q	27.30	4
Yang Bozun	S11	100m freestyle	59.04	1 Q	59.25	2nd place, silver medalist(s)
Yang Bozun	S11	400m freestyle	4:46.06	1 Q	4:43.29	2nd place, silver medalist(s)
Yang Bozun	SB11	100m breaststroke	1:13.74	1 Q	1:12.86	2nd place, silver medalist(s)
Yang Yuanrun	S6	100m backstroke	1:21.89	4 Q	1:16.35	2nd place, silver medalist(s)
Yang Yuanrun	S6	50m freestyle	31.16	3 Q	31.66	6
Yang Yuanrun	S6	100m freestyle	1:10.13	3 Q	1:08.63	3rd place, bronze medalist(s)
Yang Yuanrun	SM6	200m individual medley	2:43.53	1 Q	2:43.85	2nd place, silver medalist(s)
Zeng Huabin	S4	50m backstroke	49.44	3 Q	49.02	3rd place, bronze medalist(s)
Zeng Huabin	SB4	100m breaststroke	1:53.18	8 Q	1:52.75	7
Du Jianping; He Junquan; Tang Yuan; Yang Yuanrun	-	Men's 4 × 50 m freestyle relay	—N/a		2:18.15 WR	1st place, gold medalist(s)
Guo Zhi; Wang Xiaofu; Wei Yanpeng; Xiong Xiaoming	-	Men's 4 × 100 m freestyle relay	—N/a		3:53.92	3rd place, bronze medalist(s)
He Junquan; Li Hanhua; Li Peng; Tian Rong	-	Men's 4 × 50 m medley relay	3:00.46	6 Q	2:33.15 WR	1st place, gold medalist(s)
Tian Henghen; Wang Jiachao; Wang Renjie; Xiong Xiaoming	-	Men's 4 × 100 m medley relay	4:32.59	3 Q	4:12.6	2nd place, silver medalist(s)

==== Women ====
Athlete	Class	Event	Heats		Final	
Athlete	Class	Event	Result	Rank	Result	Rank
Cai Hongmei	S10	100m backstroke	1:18.30	12	did not advance	
Cai Hongmei	SM10	200m individual medley	2:53.82	11	did not advance	
Chen Zhonglan	S8	100m butterfly	1:16.24	4 Q	1:15.32	4
Chen Zhonglan	S8	50m freestyle	33.36	9	did not advance	
Chen Zhonglan	S8	100m freestyle	1:17.13	12	did not advance	
Chen Zhonglan	SB8	100m breaststroke	1:35.87	13	did not advance	
Dun Longjuan	S9	100m backstroke	1:18.69	12	did not advance	
Dun Longjuan	S9	400m freestyle	5:25.70	17	did not advance	
Huang Min	S7	50m butterfly	34.60 WR	1 Q	34.47 WR	1st place, gold medalist(s)
Huang Min	S7	50m freestyle	35.68	5 Q	34.85	5
Huang Min	SB7	100m breaststroke	—N/a		1:35.51	2nd place, silver medalist(s)
Huang Min	SM7	200m individual medley	3:21.00	4 Q	3:00.65	2nd place, silver medalist(s)
Jiang Fuying	S6	100m backstroke	1:33.11	3 Q	1:30.53	3rd place, bronze medalist(s)
Jiang Fuying	S6	50m butterfly	39.32	1 Q	38.44 WR	1st place, gold medalist(s)
Jiang Fuying	S6	50m freestyle	DSQ		did not advance	
Jiang Fuying	SM6	200m individual medley	3:18.17	2 Q	3:15.23	4
Jiang Shengnan	S8	50m freestyle	32.38	2 Q	32.47	4
Jiang Shengnan	SB8	100m breaststroke	1:32.90	10	did not advance	
Jiang Shengnan	SM8	200m individual medley	2:58.61	6 Q	2:57.45	6
Jin Xiaoqin	S8	100m backstroke	1:27.17	6 Q	1:25.48	6
Jin Xiaoqin	S8	100m butterfly	1:17.26	5 Q	1:15.32	3rd place, bronze medalist(s)
Jin Xiaoqin	SM8	200m individual medley	3:04.29	10	did not advance	
Lu Hongmei	SB7	100m breaststroke	—N/a		1:43.18	4
Lu Weiyuan	S8	100m backstroke	1:27.76	7 Q	1:28.55	8
Lu Weiyuan	S8	100m butterfly	1:16.18	3 Q	1:16.67	5
Lu Weiyuan	SM8	200m individual medley	3:01.03	8 Q	2:59.99	8
Qian Huiyi	S10	50m freestyle	32.20	13	did not advance	
Qian Huiyi	SB9	100m breaststroke	1:26.62	5 Q	1:26.33	4
Wang Qian	S9	100m butterfly	1:19.87	17	did not advance	
Wang Qian	S9	100m freestyle	1:09.59	18	did not advance	
Wang Qian	S9	400m freestyle	5:22.67	14	did not advance	
Wang Shuai	S10	100m backstroke	DSQ		did not advance	
Wang Shuai	S10	100m butterfly	1:10.49	2 Q	1:11.27	3rd place, bronze medalist(s)
Xia Jiangbo	S3	50m backstroke	1:13.73	5 Q	1:07.97	3rd place, bronze medalist(s)
Xia Jiangbo	S3	50m freestyle	1:05.83	4 Q	1:08.32	4
Xie Qing	S11	50m freestyle	32.19	2 Q	33.06	7
Xie Qing	S11	100m freestyle	1:10.36 WR	1 Q	1:08.96 WR	1st place, gold medalist(s)
Xu Yanru	S8	50m freestyle	32.44	3 Q	32.54	5
Xu Yanru	S8	100m freestyle	1:13.51	8 Q	1:13.66	8
Xu Yanru	S8	400m freestyle	6:03.64	9	did not advance	
Yang Tianshu	S7	50m butterfly	40.06	4 Q	39.91	5

=== Table tennis ===
==== Men's singles ====
Athlete	Event	Preliminaries				First round	Quarterfinals	Semifinals	Final / BM	
Athlete	Event	Opposition Result	Opposition Result	Opposition Result	Rank	Opposition Result	Opposition Result	Opposition Result	Opposition Result	Rank
Bai Gang	Singles C4–5	Durand (FRA); L 2-3	Sule (NGR); W 3-0	—N/a	2	did not advance				
Chen Chao	Singles C6	Arnold (GER); L 2-3	Esaulov (RUS); L 2-3	Gregorovic (CRO); L 2-3	4	did not advance				
Chen Gang	Singles C8	Csonka (HUN); W 3-0	Skrzynecki (POL); W 3-0	Vergeylen (BEL); W 3-0	1 Q	—N/a		Li M (CHN); W 3-1	Grudzien (POL); W 3-1	1st place, gold medalist(s)
Feng Panfeng	Singles C3	Dollmann (AUT); W 3-1	Knaf (BRA); W 3-0	—N/a	1 Q	—N/a	Kim Y G (KOR); W 3-2	L A Silva (BRA); W 3-0	Robin (FRA); W 3-0	1st place, gold medalist(s)
Gao Yanming	Singles C2	Kim K M (KOR); L 0–3	Riapos (SVK); L 0–3	Mennella (FRA); L 1–3	4	did not advance				
Ge Yang	Singles C9–10	Rousseau (FRA); W 3-0	Zborai (HUN); W 3-0	—N/a	1 Q	—N/a	de la Bourdonnaye (FRA); W 3-0	Last (NED); W 3-0	Ma L (CHN); W 3-1	1st place, gold medalist(s)
Guo Xingyuan	Singles C4–5	Stefanu (CZE); W 3-2	Freitas (BRA); W 3-0	—N/a	1 Q	Saleh (EGY); L 0-3	did not advance			
Li Manzhou	Singles C8	Csejtey (SVK); L 2-3	Sérignat (FRA); W 3-1	Hou T S (TPE); W 3-1	1 Q	—N/a		Chen G (CHN); L 1-3	Jambor (SVK); L 2-3	4
Ma Lin	Singles C9–10	Kubov (UKR); W 3-0	Altaraz (ISR); W 3-0	—N/a	1 Q	—N/a	Miettinen (FIN); W 3-0	Andersson (SWE); W 3-0	Ge Y (CHN); L 1-3	2nd place, silver medalist(s)
Qin Xiaojun	Singles C7	Valera (ESP); L 1-3	Furlan (ITA); L 0-3	Youssef (EGY); L 0-3	4	did not advance				
Ye Chaoqun	Singles C7	Morales (ESP); W 3-1	Karabardak (GBR); W 3-0	Lambert (CZE); W 3-0	1 Q	—N/a		Seidenfeld (USA); W 3-0	Wollmert (GER); L 1-3	2nd place, silver medalist(s)
Zhang Yan	Singles C4–5	Lin Y H (TPE); W 3-0	Chaiwut (THA); W 3-0	—N/a	1 Q	Kober (GER); W 3-1	Urhaug (NOR); L 2-3	did not advance		
Zhao Ping	Singles C3	Kim Y G (KOR); L 2-3	Lisac (SLO); W 3-0	—N/a	2	did not advance				

==== Women's singles ====
Athlete	Event	Preliminaries				Semifinals	Final / BM	
Athlete	Event	Opposition Result	Opposition Result	Opposition Result	Rank	Opposition Result	Opposition Result	Rank
Fan Lei	Singles C10	la Bourdonnaye (FRA); W 3-0	Karmayeva (RUS); W 3-0	Medhat Maghraby (EGY); W 3-0	1 Q	Hou C (CHN); W 3-1	Partyka (POL); L 0-3	2nd place, silver medalist(s)
Gu Gai	Singles C5	Wei M H (TPE); W 3-0	Paredes (MEX); WBF	Wong P Y (HKG); W 3-2	1 Q	Zimmerer (GER); W 3-1	Ren G (CHN); L 0-3	2nd place, silver medalist(s)
Hou Chunxiao	Singles C10	Partyka (POL); L 0-3	Li Yuq (CHN); L 2-3	le Morvan (FRA); W 3-1	2 Q	Fan L (CHN); L 1-3	la Bourdonnaye (CZE); W 3-0	3rd place, bronze medalist(s)
Lei Lina	Singles C9	Kavas (TUR); W 3-0	Maldonado (BRA); W 3-0	Belavic (SLO); W 3-0	1 Q	Grzelak (POL); W 3-0	Liu M (CHN); W 3-0	1st place, gold medalist(s)
Li Qian	Singles C3	Choi H J (KOR); W 3-1	Y Silva (CUB); W 3-0	Reynolds (IRL); W 3-1	1 Q	Pintar (SLO); W 3-1	Kanova (SVK); W 3-1	1st place, gold medalist(s)
Liu Jing	Singles C1–2	Mitton (GBR); W 3–1	Sireau-Gossiaux (FRA); W 3–0	—N/a	1 Q	Podda (ITA); W 3–1	Pezzutto (ITA); W 3-1	2nd place, silver medalist(s)
Liu Meili	Singles C9	Grzelak (POL); W 3-0	Komleva (RUS); W 3-0	Lazzaro (AUS); W 3-0	1 Q	Kavas (TUR); W 3-1	Lei L (CHN); L 0-3	2nd place, silver medalist(s)
Ren Guixiang	Singles C5	Lundback (SWE); W 3-0	Tsai H C (TPE); W 3-0	Passos (BRA); W 3-0	1 Q	Abuawad (JOR); W 3-0	Gu (CHN); W 3-0	1st place, gold medalist(s)
Zhang Bian	Singles C5	Zimmerer (GER); L 1-3	Chan S L (HKG); W 3-0	Barszcz (POL); W 3-1	2	did not advance		
Zhang Xiaoling	Singles C8	Mairie (FRA); W 3-1	Bengtsson (SWE); W 3-0	J Rodrigues (BRA); W 3-0	1 Q	Abrahamsson (SWE); L 2-3	Mairie (FRA); W 3-0	3rd place, bronze medalist(s)
Zhou Ying	Singles C4	Gilroy (GBR); W 3-1	Matić (SRB); W 3-0	Almeida (RSA); W 3-0	1 Q	Moon S H (KOR); W 3-0	Perić (SRB); W 3-0	1st place, gold medalist(s)

==== Men's teams ====
Athlete	Event	Round of 16	Quarterfinals	Semifinals	Final / BM	
Athlete	Event	Opposition Result	Opposition Result	Opposition Result	Opposition Result	Rank
Feng Panfeng; Gao Yanming; Zhao Ping	Team class 3	—N/a	South Korea (KOR); W 3-1	Brazil (BRA); L 2-3	Great Britain (GBR); W 3-1	3rd place, bronze medalist(s)
Bai Gang; Guo Xingyuan; Zhang Yan	Team class 4–5	Nigeria (NGR); W 3-1	Chinese Taipei (TPE); W 3-0	Norway (NOR); W 3-1	South Korea (KOR); L 1-3	2nd place, silver medalist(s)
Chen Gang; Li Manzhou; Qin Xiaojun; Ye Chaoqun	Team class 6–8	Great Britain (GBR); W 3-0	Germany (GER); W 3-2	Israel (ISR); W 3-0	Slovakia (SVK); W 3-0	1st place, gold medalist(s)
Chen Chao; Ge Yang; Lu Xiaolei; Ma Lin	Team class 9–10	Bye	Sweden (SWE); W 3-0	France (FRA); W 3-0	Spain (ESP); W 3-0	1st place, gold medalist(s)

==== Women's teams ====
Athlete	Event	Round of 16	Quarterfinals	Semifinals	Final / BM	
Athlete	Event	Opposition Result	Opposition Result	Opposition Result	Opposition Result	Rank
Li Qian; Liu Jing	Team class 1–3	—N/a	Bye	France (FRA); W 3–1	Italy (ITA); W 3-1	1st place, gold medalist(s)
Gu Gai; Ren Guixiang; Zhang Bian; Zhou Ying	Team class 4–5	Bye	Sweden (SWE); W 3-0	Jordan (JOR); W 3-1	Germany (GER); W 3-1	1st place, gold medalist(s)
Fan Lei; Hou Chunxiao; Lei Lina; Liu Meili	Team class 6–10	Bye	Ukraine (UKR); W 3-0	France (FRA); W 3-0	Poland (POL); W 3-1	1st place, gold medalist(s)

=== Volleyball ===
The men's volleyball team didn't win any medals; they were 5th out of 8 teams. However, the women's team won the gold medal after defeating the United States.

==== Men's tournament ====
Players

- Gao Hui
- Ding Xiaochao
- Dou Wencheng
- Huang Chunji
- Li Ji
- Li Lei
- Li Mingfa
- Tong Jiao
- Wang Haidong
- Wang Xiaolang
- Zhang Zhongmin
- Zhou Canming

Group A matches

7 September 2008; 15:30	China (CHN)	0–3	Bosnia and Herzegovina (BIH)	China Agricultural University Gymnasium; Attendance: 1,800; Referees: Khaled Nasr Eid Elhelaly (Egypt)
7 September 2008; 15:30	(14–25, 22–25, 17–25)			China Agricultural University Gymnasium; Attendance: 1,800; Referees: Khaled Nasr Eid Elhelaly (Egypt)

8 September 2008; 11:50	Russia (RUS)	3-0	China (CHN)	China Agricultural University Gymnasium; Attendance: 2,000; Referees: France Marcoux (France)
8 September 2008; 11:50	(25–22, 25–22, 25–23)			China Agricultural University Gymnasium; Attendance: 2,000; Referees: France Marcoux (France)

10 September 2008; 19:30	China (CHN)	3-0	Iraq (IRQ)	China Agricultural University Gymnasium; Attendance: 4,000; Referees: Ronaldo Tadeu Chaves (Brazil)
10 September 2008; 19:30	(25–9, 25–17, 25–12)			China Agricultural University Gymnasium; Attendance: 4,000; Referees: Ronaldo Tadeu Chaves (Brazil)

5-8 Semifinals

13 September 2008	Japan (JPN)	0–3	China (CHN)	China Agricultural University Gymnasium
13 September 2008	(16–25, 20–25, 19–25)			China Agricultural University Gymnasium

5th-6th place game

0000-00-00; 00:00	China (CHN)	3-1	Brazil (BRA)	China Agricultural University Gymnasium
0000-00-00; 00:00	(25–18, 23–25, 25–18, 25–19)			China Agricultural University Gymnasium

==== Women's tournament ====
Players

- Li Liping
- Liang Fen
- Liu Lijuan
- Lu Chunli
- Lu Hongqin
- Sheng Yuhong
- Tan Yanhua
- Yang Yanling
- Zhang Lijun
- Zhang Xufei
- Zheng Xiongying
- Zhong Haihong

Group B matches

7 September 2008; 21:00	Latvia (LAT)	0–3	China (CHN)	China Agricultural University Gymnasium
7 September 2008; 21:00	(4–25, 7–25, 16–25)			China Agricultural University Gymnasium

8 September 2008; 9:00	China (CHN)	3-0	Lithuania (LTU)	China Agricultural University Gymnasium
8 September 2008; 9:00	(25–18, 25–17, 25–14)			China Agricultural University Gymnasium

9 September 2008; 16:00	United States (USA)	0–3	China (CHN)	China Agricultural University Gymnasium
9 September 2008; 16:00	(14–25, 21–25, 19–25)			China Agricultural University Gymnasium

Semifinals

11 September 2008; 19:00	China (CHN)	3-0	Slovenia (SLO)	China Agricultural University Gymnasium
11 September 2008; 19:00	(25–21, 25–12, 25–19)			China Agricultural University Gymnasium

Gold medal match

14 September 2008; 18:00	United States (USA)	0–3	China (CHN)	China Agricultural University Gymnasium
14 September 2008; 18:00	(17–25, 16–25, 24–26)			China Agricultural University Gymnasium

=== Wheelchair basketball ===
The men's basketball team didn't win any medals; they were 12th out of 12 teams.

==== Players ====
- Guojun Chen
- Hai Ding
- Haijing Chen
- Hang Xu
- Huanjian Qu
- Lei Yang
- Lei Zhang
- Pengcheng Li
- Xunan Huang
- Yandong Guo
- Yinhai Lin

==== Men's tournament ====
Group B results

7 September 2008
16:15

Great Britain	81–34	China

National Indoor Stadium, Beijing

8 September 2008
12:15

China	41–80	Israel

National Indoor Stadium, Beijing

9 September 2008
11:30

Australia	79–44	China

National Indoor Stadium, Beijing

10 September 2008
17:45

China	38–97	United States

USTB Gymnasium, Beijing

11 September 2008
18:30

Brazil	65–46	China

National Indoor Stadium, Beijing

Classification 9-12

12 September 2008
11:15

China	60–67	South Africa
Scoring by quarter: 14 – 13, 15 – 19, 27 – 19, 4 – 16

National Indoor Stadium, Beijing
Attendance: 8854
Referees: Jonathon Blake Burford (USA)

Eleventh place

14 September 2008
15:45

Sweden	63–45	China
Scoring by quarter: 16 – 13, 17 – 17, 14 – 13, 16 – 2

National Indoor Stadium, Beijing
Attendance: 12000
Referees: Jorg-Ulrich Otto (GER)

The women's basketball team didn't win any medals; they were 7th out of 10 teams.

==== Players ====
- Chao Yang
- Damei Chen
- Donghuai Zheng
- Fengling Peng
- Li Gu
- Mihuan Liu
- Qiuping Cao
- Qiurong Chen
- Santao Zhang
- Wenhua Hao
- Yanhua Li
- Yongqing Fu

==== Women's tournament ====
Group B Matches

7 September 2008
17:45

Japan	49–46	China

USTB Gymnasium, Beijing

9 September 2008
13:30

China	53–37	Mexico

National Indoor Stadium, Beijing

10 September 2008
16:15

Canada	62–44	China

National Indoor Stadium, Beijing

11 September 2008
17:45

China	35–51	Netherlands

USTB Gymnasium, Beijing
Attendance: 1567
Referees: Rui David Marques (BRA)

Quarterfinals

12 September 2008
13:30

United States	75–31	China
Scoring by quarter: 24 – 6, 18 – 6, 18 – 11, 15 – 8

National Indoor Stadium, Beijing
Attendance: 8854
Referees: Charles David Saunders (RSA)

Classification 5-8

14 September 2008
9:00

China	46–53	Canada

National Indoor Stadium, Beijing
Attendance: 12000
Referees: Christopher Gregory (GBR)

Seventh place

15 September 2008
13:30

China	57–38	Great Britain

National Indoor Stadium, Beijing
Attendance: 12000
Referees: Seppo Olavi Viljanen (CZE)

=== Wheelchair fencing ===
==== Men ====
Athlete	Event	Qualification			Round of 16	Quarterfinal	Semifinal	Final / BM	
Athlete	Event	Opposition	Score	Rank	Opposition Score	Opposition Score	Opposition Score	Opposition Score	Rank
Ding Baozhong	Men's épée B	Shenkevych (UKR)	L 4-5	5 Q	Shenkevych (UKR); L 9-15	did not advance			
Ding Baozhong	Men's épée B	Bezyazychny (BLR)	L 4-5	5 Q	Shenkevych (UKR); L 9-15	did not advance			
Ding Baozhong	Men's épée B	Kim G H (KOR)	L 4-5	5 Q	Shenkevych (UKR); L 9-15	did not advance			
Ding Baozhong	Men's épée B	Mari (ITA)	W 5-4	5 Q	Shenkevych (UKR); L 9-15	did not advance			
Ding Baozhong	Men's épée B	Pluta (POL)	L 4-5	5 Q	Shenkevych (UKR); L 9-15	did not advance			
Hu Daoliang	Men's épée B	Cratere (FRA)	L 3-5	4 Q	Mainville (CAN); W 15-8	Komar (UKR); W 15-10	Shenkevych (UKR); W 15-9	Bezyazychny (BLR); W 15-13	1st place, gold medalist(s)
Hu Daoliang	Men's épée B	Rodgers (USA)	L 4-5	4 Q	Mainville (CAN); W 15-8	Komar (UKR); W 15-10	Shenkevych (UKR); W 15-9	Bezyazychny (BLR); W 15-13	1st place, gold medalist(s)
Hu Daoliang	Men's épée B	Mainville (CAN)	L 4-5	4 Q	Mainville (CAN); W 15-8	Komar (UKR); W 15-10	Shenkevych (UKR); W 15-9	Bezyazychny (BLR); W 15-13	1st place, gold medalist(s)
Hu Daoliang	Men's épée B	Soler (ESP)	W 5-0	4 Q	Mainville (CAN); W 15-8	Komar (UKR); W 15-10	Shenkevych (UKR); W 15-9	Bezyazychny (BLR); W 15-13	1st place, gold medalist(s)
Hu Daoliang	Men's épée B	Hisakawa (JPN)	W 5-0	4 Q	Mainville (CAN); W 15-8	Komar (UKR); W 15-10	Shenkevych (UKR); W 15-9	Bezyazychny (BLR); W 15-13	1st place, gold medalist(s)
Hu Daoliang	Men's foil B	Hui C H (HKG)	W 5-1	1 Q	Bye	Rodgers (USA); W 15-10	Szekeres (HUN); W 15-4	François (FRA); W 15-8	1st place, gold medalist(s)
Hu Daoliang	Men's foil B	Szekeres (HUN)	W 5-2	1 Q	Bye	Rodgers (USA); W 15-10	Szekeres (HUN); W 15-4	François (FRA); W 15-8	1st place, gold medalist(s)
Hu Daoliang	Men's foil B	Komar (UKR)	W 5-2	1 Q	Bye	Rodgers (USA); W 15-10	Szekeres (HUN); W 15-4	François (FRA); W 15-8	1st place, gold medalist(s)
Hu Daoliang	Men's foil B	Moreno (USA)	W 5-3	1 Q	Bye	Rodgers (USA); W 15-10	Szekeres (HUN); W 15-4	François (FRA); W 15-8	1st place, gold medalist(s)
Hu Daoliang	Men's foil B	Kim G H (KOR)	W 5-1	1 Q	Bye	Rodgers (USA); W 15-10	Szekeres (HUN); W 15-4	François (FRA); W 15-8	1st place, gold medalist(s)
Tian Jianquan	Men's épée A	Wong T T (HKG)	W 5–2	1 Q	Bye	Citerne (FRA); W 15–12	Stanczuk (POL); W 15–12	Zhang L (CHN); W 15-11	1st place, gold medalist(s)
Tian Jianquan	Men's épée A	Betti (ITA)	W 5-4	1 Q	Bye	Citerne (FRA); W 15–12	Stanczuk (POL); W 15–12	Zhang L (CHN); W 15-11	1st place, gold medalist(s)
Tian Jianquan	Men's épée A	Stanczuk (POL)	W 5-3	1 Q	Bye	Citerne (FRA); W 15–12	Stanczuk (POL); W 15–12	Zhang L (CHN); W 15-11	1st place, gold medalist(s)
Tian Jianquan	Men's épée A	Al Qallaf (KUW)	W 5-0	1 Q	Bye	Citerne (FRA); W 15–12	Stanczuk (POL); W 15–12	Zhang L (CHN); W 15-11	1st place, gold medalist(s)
Tian Jianquan	Men's épée A	Horvath (HUN)	W 5-0	1 Q	Bye	Citerne (FRA); W 15–12	Stanczuk (POL); W 15–12	Zhang L (CHN); W 15-11	1st place, gold medalist(s)
Tian Jianquan	Men's sabre A	Chan W K (HKG)	W 5-3	1 Q	Serafini (ITA); W 15-3	Pylarinos Markantonatos (GRE); W 15-8	Pellegrini (ITA); W 15-8	Ye R (CHN); L 14-15	2nd place, silver medalist(s)
Tian Jianquan	Men's sabre A	Pylarinos Markantonatos (GRE)	W 5-1	1 Q	Serafini (ITA); W 15-3	Pylarinos Markantonatos (GRE); W 15-8	Pellegrini (ITA); W 15-8	Ye R (CHN); L 14-15	2nd place, silver medalist(s)
Tian Jianquan	Men's sabre A	Davydenko (UKR)	W 5-3	1 Q	Serafini (ITA); W 15-3	Pylarinos Markantonatos (GRE); W 15-8	Pellegrini (ITA); W 15-8	Ye R (CHN); L 14-15	2nd place, silver medalist(s)
Tian Jianquan	Men's sabre A	Serafini (ITA)	W 5-1	1 Q	Serafini (ITA); W 15-3	Pylarinos Markantonatos (GRE); W 15-8	Pellegrini (ITA); W 15-8	Ye R (CHN); L 14-15	2nd place, silver medalist(s)
Tian Jianquan	Men's sabre A	Redondo (ESP)	W 5-1	1 Q	Serafini (ITA); W 15-3	Pylarinos Markantonatos (GRE); W 15-8	Pellegrini (ITA); W 15-8	Ye R (CHN); L 14-15	2nd place, silver medalist(s)
Ye Ruyi	Men's foil A	Chan W K (HKG)	W 5-2	1 Q	Frolov (RUS); W 15-9	Al Qallaf (KUW); W 15-6	Pender (POL); W 15-4	Zhang L (CHN); W 15-12	1st place, gold medalist(s)
Ye Ruyi	Men's foil A	Bazhukov (UKR)	W 5-0	1 Q	Frolov (RUS); W 15-9	Al Qallaf (KUW); W 15-6	Pender (POL); W 15-4	Zhang L (CHN); W 15-12	1st place, gold medalist(s)
Ye Ruyi	Men's foil A	Makowski (POL)	W 5-1	1 Q	Frolov (RUS); W 15-9	Al Qallaf (KUW); W 15-6	Pender (POL); W 15-4	Zhang L (CHN); W 15-12	1st place, gold medalist(s)
Ye Ruyi	Men's foil A	Frolov (RUS)	W 5-2	1 Q	Frolov (RUS); W 15-9	Al Qallaf (KUW); W 15-6	Pender (POL); W 15-4	Zhang L (CHN); W 15-12	1st place, gold medalist(s)
Ye Ruyi	Men's foil A	Calhoun (USA)	W 5-1	1 Q	Frolov (RUS); W 15-9	Al Qallaf (KUW); W 15-6	Pender (POL); W 15-4	Zhang L (CHN); W 15-12	1st place, gold medalist(s)
Ye Ruyi	Men's sabre A	Stanczuk (POL)	W 5-2	1 Q	Bye	Stanczuk (POL); W 15-9	Chan W K (HKG); W 15-11	Tian J (CHN); W 15-14	1st place, gold medalist(s)
Ye Ruyi	Men's sabre A	Mato (HUN)	W 5-0	1 Q	Bye	Stanczuk (POL); W 15-9	Chan W K (HKG); W 15-11	Tian J (CHN); W 15-14	1st place, gold medalist(s)
Ye Ruyi	Men's sabre A	Citerne (FRA)	W 5-0	1 Q	Bye	Stanczuk (POL); W 15-9	Chan W K (HKG); W 15-11	Tian J (CHN); W 15-14	1st place, gold medalist(s)
Ye Ruyi	Men's sabre A	Andreev (RUS)	W 5-1	1 Q	Bye	Stanczuk (POL); W 15-9	Chan W K (HKG); W 15-11	Tian J (CHN); W 15-14	1st place, gold medalist(s)
Ye Ruyi	Men's sabre A	Alexakis (GRE)	W 5-4	1 Q	Bye	Stanczuk (POL); W 15-9	Chan W K (HKG); W 15-11	Tian J (CHN); W 15-14	1st place, gold medalist(s)
Zhang Lei	Men's épée A	Citerne (FRA)	W 5-3	1 Q	Granell (ESP); W 15-7	Saengsawang (THA); W 15-9	Maillard (FRA); W 15-10	Tian J (CHN); L 11-15	2nd place, silver medalist(s)
Zhang Lei	Men's épée A	Pender (POL)	W 5-4	1 Q	Granell (ESP); W 15-7	Saengsawang (THA); W 15-9	Maillard (FRA); W 15-10	Tian J (CHN); L 11-15	2nd place, silver medalist(s)
Zhang Lei	Men's épée A	Bazhukov (UKR)	W 5-3	1 Q	Granell (ESP); W 15-7	Saengsawang (THA); W 15-9	Maillard (FRA); W 15-10	Tian J (CHN); L 11-15	2nd place, silver medalist(s)
Zhang Lei	Men's épée A	Granell (ESP)	L 4-5	1 Q	Granell (ESP); W 15-7	Saengsawang (THA); W 15-9	Maillard (FRA); W 15-10	Tian J (CHN); L 11-15	2nd place, silver medalist(s)
Zhang Lei	Men's épée A	Andree (GER)	W 5-1	1 Q	Granell (ESP); W 15-7	Saengsawang (THA); W 15-9	Maillard (FRA); W 15-10	Tian J (CHN); L 11-15	2nd place, silver medalist(s)
Zhang Lei	Men's foil A	Betti (ITA)	W 5-0	1 Q	Bye	Maillard (FRA); W 15-3	Chan Wing Kin (HKG); W 15-5	Ye R (CHN); L 12-15	2nd place, silver medalist(s)
Zhang Lei	Men's foil A	Al Qallaf (KUW)	W 5-0	1 Q	Bye	Maillard (FRA); W 15-3	Chan Wing Kin (HKG); W 15-5	Ye R (CHN); L 12-15	2nd place, silver medalist(s)
Zhang Lei	Men's foil A	Horvath (HUN)	W 5-1	1 Q	Bye	Maillard (FRA); W 15-3	Chan Wing Kin (HKG); W 15-5	Ye R (CHN); L 12-15	2nd place, silver medalist(s)
Zhang Lei	Men's foil A	Granell (ESP)	W 5-0	1 Q	Bye	Maillard (FRA); W 15-3	Chan Wing Kin (HKG); W 15-5	Ye R (CHN); L 12-15	2nd place, silver medalist(s)
Zhang Lei	Men's foil A	Saengsawang (THA)	W 5-1	1 Q	Bye	Maillard (FRA); W 15-3	Chan Wing Kin (HKG); W 15-5	Ye R (CHN); L 12-15	2nd place, silver medalist(s)
Zhang Lei	Men's foil A	Andree (GER)	W 5-0	1 Q	Bye	Maillard (FRA); W 15-3	Chan Wing Kin (HKG); W 15-5	Ye R (CHN); L 12-15	2nd place, silver medalist(s)

==== Women ====
Athlete	Event	Qualification			Round of 16	Quarterfinal	Semifinal	Final / BM	
Athlete	Event	Opposition	Score	Rank	Opposition Score	Opposition Score	Opposition Score	Opposition Score	Rank
Yao Fang	Women's épée B	Vasilyeva (RUS)	L 4-5	2 Q	Bye	Dani (HUN); W 15-12	Vasilyeva (RUS); W 15-10	Chan Y C (HKG); L 12-15	2nd place, silver medalist(s)
Yao Fang	Women's épée B	Magnat (FRA)	W 5-2	2 Q	Bye	Dani (HUN); W 15-12	Vasilyeva (RUS); W 15-10	Chan Y C (HKG); L 12-15	2nd place, silver medalist(s)
Yao Fang	Women's épée B	Vettraino (ITA)	W 5-1	2 Q	Bye	Dani (HUN); W 15-12	Vasilyeva (RUS); W 15-10	Chan Y C (HKG); L 12-15	2nd place, silver medalist(s)
Yao Fang	Women's épée B	Palfi (HUN)	W 5-3	2 Q	Bye	Dani (HUN); W 15-12	Vasilyeva (RUS); W 15-10	Chan Y C (HKG); L 12-15	2nd place, silver medalist(s)
Yao Fang	Women's épée B	Demello (USA)	W 5-0	2 Q	Bye	Dani (HUN); W 15-12	Vasilyeva (RUS); W 15-10	Chan Y C (HKG); L 12-15	2nd place, silver medalist(s)
Yao Fang	Women's foil B	Dani (HUN)	W 5-1	1 Q	Bye	Vasilyeva (RUS); W 15-7	Jana (THA); W 15-11	Chan Y C (HKG); L 8-15	2nd place, silver medalist(s)
Yao Fang	Women's foil B	Lukianenko (UKR)	W 5-4	1 Q	Bye	Vasilyeva (RUS); W 15-7	Jana (THA); W 15-11	Chan Y C (HKG); L 8-15	2nd place, silver medalist(s)
Yao Fang	Women's foil B	Magnat (FRA)	W 5-4	1 Q	Bye	Vasilyeva (RUS); W 15-7	Jana (THA); W 15-11	Chan Y C (HKG); L 8-15	2nd place, silver medalist(s)
Yao Fang	Women's foil B	Hassen Bey (ESP)	W 5-1	1 Q	Bye	Vasilyeva (RUS); W 15-7	Jana (THA); W 15-11	Chan Y C (HKG); L 8-15	2nd place, silver medalist(s)
Yao Fang	Women's foil B	Vettraino (ITA)	W 5-1	1 Q	Bye	Vasilyeva (RUS); W 15-7	Jana (THA); W 15-11	Chan Y C (HKG); L 8-15	2nd place, silver medalist(s)
Ye Hua	Women's épée B	Jana (THA)	L 3-5	3 Q	Chan Y C (HKG); L 10-15	did not advance			
Ye Hua	Women's épée B	Chan Y C (HKG)	L 1-5	3 Q	Chan Y C (HKG); L 10-15	did not advance			
Ye Hua	Women's épée B	Dani (HUN)	W 5-3	3 Q	Chan Y C (HKG); L 10-15	did not advance			
Ye Hua	Women's épée B	Lukianenko (UKR)	W 5-4	3 Q	Chan Y C (HKG); L 10-15	did not advance			
Ye Hua	Women's épée B	Hassen Bey (ESP)	W 5-3	3 Q	Chan Y C (HKG); L 10-15	did not advance			
Ye Hua	Women's foil B	Chan Y C (HKG)	W 5-3	2 Q	Bye	Lukianenko (UKR); W 15-8	Chan Y C (HKG); L 5-15	Jana (THA); W 15-14	3rd place, bronze medalist(s)
Ye Hua	Women's foil B	Jana (THA)	L 4-5	2 Q	Bye	Lukianenko (UKR); W 15-8	Chan Y C (HKG); L 5-15	Jana (THA); W 15-14	3rd place, bronze medalist(s)
Ye Hua	Women's foil B	Palfi (HUN)	W 5-3	2 Q	Bye	Lukianenko (UKR); W 15-8	Chan Y C (HKG); L 5-15	Jana (THA); W 15-14	3rd place, bronze medalist(s)
Ye Hua	Women's foil B	Vasilyeva (RUS)	W 5-1	2 Q	Bye	Lukianenko (UKR); W 15-8	Chan Y C (HKG); L 5-15	Jana (THA); W 15-14	3rd place, bronze medalist(s)
Ye Hua	Women's foil B	Demello (USA)	W 5-0	2 Q	Bye	Lukianenko (UKR); W 15-8	Chan Y C (HKG); L 5-15	Jana (THA); W 15-14	3rd place, bronze medalist(s)
Zhang Chuncui	Women's épée A	Gorlina (UKR)	W 5-4	1 Q	Bye	Zhang W (CHN); W 15–9	Krajnyak (HUN); W 15–10	Yu C Y (HKG); W 15-13	1st place, gold medalist(s)
Zhang Chuncui	Women's épée A	Krajnyak (HUN)	W 5-3	1 Q	Bye	Zhang W (CHN); W 15–9	Krajnyak (HUN); W 15–10	Yu C Y (HKG); W 15-13	1st place, gold medalist(s)
Zhang Chuncui	Women's épée A	Fan P S (HKG)	W 5-4	1 Q	Bye	Zhang W (CHN); W 15–9	Krajnyak (HUN); W 15–10	Yu C Y (HKG); W 15-13	1st place, gold medalist(s)
Zhang Chuncui	Women's épée A	Trigilia (ITA)	W 5-2	1 Q	Bye	Zhang W (CHN); W 15–9	Krajnyak (HUN); W 15–10	Yu C Y (HKG); W 15-13	1st place, gold medalist(s)
Zhang Chuncui	Women's épée A	Picot (FRA)	W 5-1	1 Q	Bye	Zhang W (CHN); W 15–9	Krajnyak (HUN); W 15–10	Yu C Y (HKG); W 15-13	1st place, gold medalist(s)
Zhang Chuncui	Women's foil A	Yu C Y (HKG)	W 5-3	1 Q	Bye	Zhang W (CHN); W 15-12	Fan P S (HKG); W 15-1	Yu C Y (HKG); L 13-15	2nd place, silver medalist(s)
Zhang Chuncui	Women's foil A	Trigilia (ITA)	W 5-0	1 Q	Bye	Zhang W (CHN); W 15-12	Fan P S (HKG); W 15-1	Yu C Y (HKG); L 13-15	2nd place, silver medalist(s)
Zhang Chuncui	Women's foil A	Picot (FRA)	W 5-1	1 Q	Bye	Zhang W (CHN); W 15-12	Fan P S (HKG); W 15-1	Yu C Y (HKG); L 13-15	2nd place, silver medalist(s)
Zhang Chuncui	Women's foil A	Halkina (BLR)	W 5-2	1 Q	Bye	Zhang W (CHN); W 15-12	Fan P S (HKG); W 15-1	Yu C Y (HKG); L 13-15	2nd place, silver medalist(s)
Zhang Chuncui	Women's foil A	Juhasz (HUN)	W 5-0	1 Q	Bye	Zhang W (CHN); W 15-12	Fan P S (HKG); W 15-1	Yu C Y (HKG); L 13-15	2nd place, silver medalist(s)
Zhang Wenxin	Women's épée A	Yu C Y (HKG)	L 4-5	5 Q	Halkina (BLR); W 15-11	Zhang C (CHN); L 9-15	did not advance		
Zhang Wenxin	Women's épée A	Juhasz (HUN)	L 3-5	5 Q	Halkina (BLR); W 15-11	Zhang C (CHN); L 9-15	did not advance		
Zhang Wenxin	Women's épée A	Witos-Eze (POL)	L 3-5	5 Q	Halkina (BLR); W 15-11	Zhang C (CHN); L 9-15	did not advance		
Zhang Wenxin	Women's épée A	Halkina (BLR)	L 4-5	5 Q	Halkina (BLR); W 15-11	Zhang C (CHN); L 9-15	did not advance		
Zhang Wenxin	Women's épée A	Poignet (FRA)	W 5-1	5 Q	Halkina (BLR); W 15-11	Zhang C (CHN); L 9-15	did not advance		
Zhang Wenxin	Women's foil A	Poignet (FRA)	L 1-5	4 Q	Gorlina (UKR); W 15-4	Zhang C (CHN); L 12-15	did not advance		
Zhang Wenxin	Women's foil A	Fan P S (HKG)	L 3-5	4 Q	Gorlina (UKR); W 15-4	Zhang C (CHN); L 12-15	did not advance		
Zhang Wenxin	Women's foil A	Krajnyak (HUN)	W 5-4	4 Q	Gorlina (UKR); W 15-4	Zhang C (CHN); L 12-15	did not advance		
Zhang Wenxin	Women's foil A	Gorlina (UKR)	W 5-1	4 Q	Gorlina (UKR); W 15-4	Zhang C (CHN); L 12-15	did not advance		
Zhang Wenxin	Women's foil A	Witos-Eze (POL)	L 3-5	4 Q	Gorlina (UKR); W 15-4	Zhang C (CHN); L 12-15	did not advance		

=== Wheelchair rugby ===
The men's rugby team didn't win any medals; they were 8th out of 8 teams.

==== Players ====
- Chen Jun
- Cheng Shuangmiao
- Cui Maosheng
- Han Guifei
- Pan Zilin
- Shao Dequan
- Tao Zhenfang
- Tian Shilin
- Wang Sheng
- Xia Junfeng
- Yu Zhongtao
- Zhang Wenli

==== Tournament ====
Game	Match	Score	Rank
1	China vs. United States (USA)	30 – 65	Group A 4
2	China vs. Canada (CAN)	25 – 57	Group A 4
3	China vs. Japan (JPN)	38 – 55	Group A 4
5-8th classification	China vs. New Zealand (NZL)	34 – 47	L
7/8th classification	China vs. Japan (JPN)	32 – 58	8

=== Wheelchair tennis ===
==== Men ====
Athlete	Event	Round of 64	Round of 32	Round of 16	Quarterfinals	Semifinals	Finals
Athlete	Event	Opposition Result	Opposition Result	Opposition Result	Opposition Result	Opposition Result	Opposition Result
Li Baiqing	Singles	Oquendo (COL); W 7–5, 3–6, 6–4	Kruszelnicki (POL); L 1–6, 4–6	did not advance			
Shi Yanping	Singles	Stuurman (NED); L 4–6, 4–6	did not advance				
Li Baiqing; Shi Yanping	Doubles	—N/a	Rydberg (USA) / Welch (USA); L 4–6, 7–6, 1–6	did not advance			

==== Women ====
Athlete	Event	Round of 32	Round of 16	Quarterfinals	Semifinals	Finals
Athlete	Event	Opposition Result	Opposition Result	Opposition Result	Opposition Result	Opposition Result
Dong Fuli	Singles	Yaosa (JPN); W 6–4, 6–4	Racineux (FRA); W 6–0, 6–2	Vergeer (NED); L 2–6, 0–6	did not advance	
Hu Dandan	Singles	Lauro (ITA); W 6–2, 6–4	Fridman (ISR); W 6–1, 3–6, 6–4	Homan (NED); L 1–6, 1–6	did not advance	
Dong Fuli; Hu Dandan	Doubles	—N/a	Hong Y-S (KOR) / Hwang M-H (KOR); W 6–1, 6–3	Homan (NED) / Walraven (NED); L 0–6, 2–6	did not advance	

== See also ==
- China at the Paralympics
- China at the 2008 Summer Olympics
- Sports in China
