= Athletics at the 2008 Summer Paralympics – Men's discus throw F35–36 =

Men's Discus F35/36 at the XIII Paralympic Games
- Venue: Beijing National Stadium
- Dates: 11 September
- Competitors: 10 from 8 nations
- Winning distance: 54.13

Medalists
1st place, gold medalist(s)		Guo Wei	China
2nd place, silver medalist(s)		Wang Wenbo	China
3rd place, bronze medalist(s)		Reginald Benade	Namibia

The men's discus F35/36 event at the 2008 Summer Paralympics took place at the Beijing National Stadium on 11 September. There was a single round of competition; after the first three throws, only the top eight had 3 further throws.

Rank	Athlete	Nationality	Class	1	2	3	4	5	6	Best	Points	Notes
1st place, gold medalist(s)	Guo Wei	China	F35	47.41	51.88	50.39	54.13	51.60	x	54.13	1131	
2nd place, silver medalist(s)	Wang Wenbo	China	F36	37.43	38.98	35.82	35.28	37.15	36.41	38.98	1116	
3rd place, bronze medalist(s)	Reginald Benade	Namibia	F36	x	30.20	31.32	x	37.57	34.32	37.57	1076	
4	Duane Strydom	South Africa	F36	32.28	33.49	36.47	35.05	x	36.09	36.47	1044	
5	Edgars Bergs	Latvia	F35	43.29	43.68	x	41.41	47.02	40.16	47.02	982	
6	Paulo Souza	Brazil	F36	x	34.10	x	27.23	33.91	32.79	34.10	977	
7	Willem Noorduin	Netherlands	F36	32.60	32.03	31.11	32.58	32.59	x	32.60	934	
8	Paweł Piotrowski	Poland	F36	30.70	x	31.40	30.80	x	31.75	31.75	909	
9	Thierry Cibone	France	F35	40.57	41.22	40.61	-	-	-	41.22	861	
10	Fu Xinhan	China	F35	36.90	39.59	37.70	-	-	-	39.59	827	
