= Athletics at the 2008 Summer Paralympics – Men's shot put F35–36 =

Men's Shot Put F35/36 at the XIII Paralympic Games
- Venue: Beijing National Stadium
- Dates: 14 September
- Competitors: 9 from 7 nations
- Winning distance: 16.22

Medalists
1st place, gold medalist(s)		Guo Wei	China
2nd place, silver medalist(s)		Edgars Bergs	Latvia
3rd place, bronze medalist(s)		Paweł Piotrowski	Poland

The men's shot put F35/36 event at the 2008 Summer Paralympics took place at the Beijing National Stadium at 10:20 on 14 September. There was a single round of competition; after the first three throws, only the top eight had 3 further throws. The competition was won by Guo Wei, representing China.

== Results ==
Rank	Athlete	Nationality	Cl.	1	2	3	4	5	6	Best	Pts.	Notes
1st place, gold medalist(s)	Guo Wei	China	F35	15.78	x	14.64	x	x	16.22	16.22	1122	WR
2nd place, silver medalist(s)	Edgars Bergs	Latvia	F35	14.96	14.56	14.66	14.05	14.66	15.54	15.54	1075	SB
3rd place, bronze medalist(s)	Paweł Piotrowski	Poland	F36	12.34	12.84	12.73	x	x	13.03	13.03	1044	WR
4	Wang Wenbo	China	F36	11.67	11.90	11.77	12.03	12.13	11.03	12.13	972	SB
5	Thierry Cibone	France	F35	13.03	13.05	12.77	13.37	14.03	x	14.03	971	SB
6	Reginald Benade	Namibia	F36	10.95	11.53	11.59	x	11.19	x	11.59	929	
7	Willem Noorduin	Netherlands	F36	11.01	11.27	11.09	11.22	11.03	11.14	11.27	903	
8	Fu Xinhan	China	F35	10.61	11.66	12.20	11.18	11.52	11.51	12.20	844	
9	Paulo Souza	Brazil	F36	9.72	x	9.92	-	-	-	9.92	795	

WR = World Record. SB = Seasonal Best.
