= Swimming at the 2008 Summer Paralympics – Men's 100 metre freestyle S6 =

Men's 100m Freestyle S6 at the XIII Paralympic Games
- Venue: Beijing National Aquatics Center
- Dates: 8 September
- Competitors: 11 from 9 nations
- Winning time: 1:05.95

Medalists
1st place, gold medalist(s)		Anders Olsson	Sweden
2nd place, silver medalist(s)		Tang Yuan	China
3rd place, bronze medalist(s)		Yang Yuanrun	China

The men's 100m freestyle S6 event at the 2008 Summer Paralympics took place at the Beijing National Aquatics Center on 8 September. There were two heats; the swimmers with the eight fastest times advanced to the final.

== Results ==
=== Heats ===
Competed from 09:13.

==== Heat 1 ====
Rank	Name	Nationality	Time	Notes
1	Tang Yuan	China	1:08.84	Q
2	Adriano Lima	Brazil	1:10.90	Q
3	Daniel Vidal	Spain	1:11.37	Q
4	Matt Whorwood	Great Britain	1:12.51	Q
	Andreas Potamitis	Cyprus		DQ

==== Heat 2 ====
Rank	Name	Nationality	Time	Notes
1	Anders Olsson	Sweden	1:07.68	Q
2	Yang Yuanrun	China	1:10.13	Q
3	Swen Michaelis	Germany	1:12.14	Q
4	Kyosuke Oyama	Japan	1:12.25	Q
5	Sebastian Iwanow	Germany	1:21.78	
6	Stian Helgeland	Norway	1:15.68	

=== Final ===
Competed at 17:10.

Rank	Name	Nationality	Time	Notes
1st place, gold medalist(s)	Anders Olsson	Sweden	1:05.95	WR
2nd place, silver medalist(s)	Tang Yuan	China	1:06.42	
3rd place, bronze medalist(s)	Yang Yuanrun	China	1:08.63	
4	Daniel Vidal	Spain	1:10.41	
5	Adriano Lima	Brazil	1:10.91	
6	Matt Whorwood	Great Britain	1:11.62	
7	Kyosuke Oyama	Japan	1:12.24	
8	Swen Michaelis	Germany	1:12.31	

Q = qualified for final. WR = World Record. DQ = Disqualified.
