= Swimming at the 2008 Summer Paralympics – Men's 200 metre individual medley SM6 =

Men's 200 metre individual medley SM6 at the XIII Paralympic Games
- Venue: Beijing National Aquatics Center
- Dates: September 7
- Competitors: 11 from 7 nations

Medalists
1st place, gold medalist(s)		Sascha Kindred	Great Britain
2nd place, silver medalist(s)		Yuanrun Yang	China
3rd place, bronze medalist(s)		Xu Qing	China

The men's 200 metre individual medley SM6 event at the 2008 Paralympic Games took place on September 7, at the Beijing National Aquatics Center.

Two heats were held, with five swimmers in the first heat and six swimmers in the second heat. The swimmers with the eight fastest times advanced to the final; there, they all competed in a single final heat to earn final placements.

== Heats ==
=== Heat 1 ===
Rank	Lane	Name	Nationality	Time	Notes
1	4	Yuanrun Yang	China	2:73.53	Q
2	5	Matt Whorwood	Great Britain	2:54.00	Q
3	6	Anders Olsson	Sweden	3:03.35	Q
4	3	Thomas Grimm	Germany	3:08.22	Q
5	2	Tadhg Slattery	South Africa	3:12.49	

=== Heat 2 ===
Rank	Lane	Name	Nationality	Time	Notes
1	4	Sascha Kindred	Great Britain	2:48.35	Q
2	5	Xu Qing	China	2:52.91	Q
3	3	Ce Liu	China	3:02.28	Q
4	6	Swen Michaelis	Germany	3:05.37	Q
5	2	Mateusz Michalski	Poland	3:12.83	
6	7	Aung Naing Sit	Myanmar	3:39.32	

== Final ==
Rank	Lane	Name	Nationality	Time	Notes
1	4	Sascha Kindred	Great Britain	2:42.19	
2	3	Yuanrun Yang	China	2:43.85	
3	5	Xu Qing	China	2:48.45	
4	6	Matt Whorwood	Great Britain	2:55.06	
5	2	Ce Liu	China	2:56.94	
6	7	Anders Olsson	Sweden	2:57.30	
7	8	Grimm Thomas	Germany	3:08.90	
	1	Swen Michaelis	Germany		DSQ
