= Swimming at the 2004 Summer Paralympics – Men's 400 metre freestyle S6 =

Men's 400m Freestyle S6 at the XII Paralympic Games
- Paralympic Swimming
- Venue: Olympic Aquatic Centre
- Dates: 26 September 2004
- Competitors: 16 from 12 nations
- Winning time: 5:03.76

Medalists
1st place, gold medalist(s)		Anders Olsson	Sweden
2nd place, silver medalist(s)		Tang Yuan	China
3rd place, bronze medalist(s)		Peter Lund Andersen	Denmark

The Men's 400 metre freestyle S6 swimming event at the 2004 Summer Paralympics was competed on 26 September. It was won by Anders Olsson, representing Sweden.

== 1st round ==
Qualified for final round

Heat 1

26 Sept. 2004, morning session

Rank	Athlete	Time	Notes
1	Peter Lund Andersen (DEN)	5:31.56	
2	Soren Moller (DEN)	5:34.80	
3	Sebastian Iwanow (GER)	5:42.11	
4	Hadleigh Pierson (NZL)	5:45.55	
5	Jorgen Tadvin (NOR)	6:06.60	
6	Petr Andrysek (CZE)	6:19.19	
7	Diego Pastore (ARG)	6:26.71	
	Adriano Lima (BRA)	DNS	

Heat 2

26 Sept. 2004, morning session

Rank	Athlete	Time	Notes
1	Anders Olsson (SWE)	5:11.63	PR
2	Tang Yuan (CHN)	5:13.30	
3	Swen Michaelis (GER)	5:36.26	
4	Danijel Pavlinec (SLO)	5:39.91	
5	Maciej Sucharski (POL)	5:46.38	
6	Luis Silva (BRA)	6:07.41	
7	Fernando Carlomagno (ARG)	6:09.16	
8	Lee Sun Wook (KOR)	6:31.97	

== Final round ==
26 Sept. 2004, evening session

Rank	Athlete	Time	Notes
1st place, gold medalist(s)	Anders Olsson (SWE)	5:03.76	WR
2nd place, silver medalist(s)	Tang Yuan (CHN)	5:14.10	
3rd place, bronze medalist(s)	Peter Lund Andersen (DEN)	5:23.72	
4	Swen Michaelis (GER)	5:24.16	
5	Sebastian Iwanow (GER)	5:38.16	
6	Soren Moller (DEN)	5:40.84	
7	Danijel Pavlinec (SLO)	5:40.91	
8	Hadleigh Pierson (NZL)	5:44.09	
