= Athletics at the 2008 Summer Paralympics – Men's javelin throw F35–36 =

Men's Javelin F35/36 at the XIII Paralympic Games
- Venue: Beijing National Stadium
- Dates: 8 September
- Competitors: 6 from 5 nations
- Winning distance: 56.07

Medalists
1st place, gold medalist(s)		Guo Wei	China
2nd place, silver medalist(s)		Paweł Piotrowski	Poland
3rd place, bronze medalist(s)		Nicholas Newman	South Africa

The men's javelin F35/36 event at the 2008 Summer Paralympics took place at the Beijing National Stadium at 18:18 on 8 September. There was a single round of competition, and as there were only 6 contestants they all had 6 throws. The competition was won by Guo Wei, representing China.

== Results ==
Rank	Athlete	Nationality	Cl.	1	2	3	4	5	6	Best	Pts.	Notes
1st place, gold medalist(s)	Guo Wei	China	F35	54.92	56.07	53.13	51.67	51.04	53.62	56.07	1283	WR
2nd place, silver medalist(s)	Paweł Piotrowski	Poland	F36	38.81	36.10	x	40.74	41.14	42.88	42.88	1158	WR
3rd place, bronze medalist(s)	Nicholas Newman	South Africa	F36	x	39.72	38.32	39.40	35.81	42.48	42.48	1147	SB
4	Paulo Souza	Brazil	F36	32.37	30.44	x	39.72	34.58	36.17	39.72	1073	SB
5	Mohsen Kaedi	Iran	F35	42.61	40.28	41.73	42.53	42.31	41.66	42.61	975	SB
6	Wang Wenbo	China	F36	31.97	28.41	32.49	31.80	31.67	32.41	32.49	878	

WR = World Record. SB = Seasonal Best.
