= Swimming at the 2008 Summer Paralympics – Men's 50 metre butterfly S7 =

Men's 50m Butterfly S7 at the XIII Paralympic Games
- Venue: Beijing National Aquatics Center
- Dates: 13 September
- Competitors: 10 from 8 nations
- Winning time: 30.37

Medalists
1st place, gold medalist(s)		Tian Rong	China
2nd place, silver medalist(s)		Matt Walker	Great Britain
3rd place, bronze medalist(s)		Pei Mang	China

The men's 50m butterfly S7 event at the 2008 Summer Paralympics took place at the Beijing National Aquatics Center on 13 September. There were two heats; the swimmers with the eight fastest times advanced to the final.

== Results ==
=== Heats ===
Competed from 09:27.

==== Heat 1 ====
Rank	Name	Nationality	Time	Notes
1	Matt Walker	Great Britain	32.49	Q
2	Pei Mang	China	32.85	Q
3	Daisuke Ejima	Japan	33.12	Q
4	Lantz Lamback	United States	33.83	Q
5	Gao Nan	China	35.62	

==== Heat 2 ====
Rank	Name	Nationality	Time	Notes
1	Tian Rong	China	31.09	Q, WR
2	Kevin Lambrechts	Belgium	33.57	Q
3	Ruslan Sadvakasov	Russia	33.74	Q
4	Iurii Andriushin	Ukraine	33.99	Q
5	Alex Hadley	Australia	37.10	

=== Final ===
Competed at 17:37.

Rank	Name	Nationality	Time	Notes
1st place, gold medalist(s)	Tian Rong	China	30.37	WR
2nd place, silver medalist(s)	Matt Walker	Great Britain	32.24	
3rd place, bronze medalist(s)	Pei Mang	China	32.47	
4	Daisuke Ejima	Japan	33.69	
5	Kevin Lambrechts	Belgium	33.80	
6	Iurii Andriushin	Ukraine	34.07	
7	Ruslan Sadvakasov	Russia	34.12	
8	Lantz Lamback	United States	34.56	

Q = qualified for final. WR = World Record.
