= Swimming at the 2008 Summer Paralympics – Men's 200 metre individual medley SM7 =

Men's 200m Individual Medley SM7 at the XIII Paralympic Games
- Venue: Beijing National Aquatics Center
- Dates: 7 September
- Competitors: 13 from 10 nations
- Winning time: 2:35.92

Medalists
1st place, gold medalist(s)		Rudy Garcia-Tolson	United States
2nd place, silver medalist(s)		Tian Rong	China
3rd place, bronze medalist(s)		Matt Walker	Great Britain

The men's 200m individual medley SM7 event at the 2008 Summer Paralympics took place at the Beijing National Aquatics Center on 7 September. There were two heats; the swimmers with the eight fastest times advanced to the final.

== Results ==
=== Heats ===
Competed from 10:16.

==== Heat 1 ====
Rank	Name	Nationality	Time	Notes
1	Tian Rong	China	2:49.17	Q
2	Gao Nan	China	2:55.12	Q
3	Ma Fei	China	2:55.56	Q
4	Daisuke Ejima	Japan	2:58.38	
5	Gledson Soares	Brazil	3:08.72	
6	Kirill Sokolov	Russia	3:13.84	

==== Heat 2 ====
Rank	Name	Nationality	Time	Notes
1	Rudy Garcia-Tolson	United States	2:37.80	Q, WR
2	Kevin Lambrechts	Belgium	2:53.93	Q
3	Matt Walker	Great Britain	2:54.30	Q
4	Jumpei Kimura	Japan	2:56.73	Q
5	János Becsey	Hungary	2:58.31	Q
6	Jay Dohnt	Australia	3:03.73	
7	Dejan Fabcic	Slovenia	3:05.24	

=== Final ===
Competed at 19:10.

Rank	Name	Nationality	Time	Notes
1st place, gold medalist(s)	Rudy Garcia-Tolson	United States	2:35.92	WR
2nd place, silver medalist(s)	Tian Rong	China	2:46.20	
3rd place, bronze medalist(s)	Matt Walker	Great Britain	2:50.10	
4	Gao Nan	China	2:51.52	
5	Ma Fei	China	2:53.42	
6	Kevin Lambrechts	Belgium	2:54.98	
7	Jumpei Kimura	Japan	2:55.03	
	János Becsey	Hungary		DQ

Q = qualified for final. WR = World Record. DQ = Disqualified.
