= Athletics at the 2008 Summer Paralympics – Women's 100 metres T54 =

Women's 100m T54 at the XIII Paralympic Games
- Venue: Beijing National Stadium
- Dates: 10 September
- Competitors: 13 from 9 nations
- Winning time: 16.15

Medalists
1st place, gold medalist(s)		Chantal Petitclerc	Canada
2nd place, silver medalist(s)		Liu Wenjun	China
3rd place, bronze medalist(s)		Dong Hongjiao	China

The women's 100m T54 event at the 2008 Summer Paralympics took place at the Beijing National Stadium on 10 September. There were two heats; the first 3 in each heat (Q) plus the 2 fastest other times (q) qualified.

== Results ==
=== Heats ===
Competed from 12:14.

==== Heat 1 ====
Rank	Name	Nationality	Time	Notes
1	Chantal Petitclerc	Canada	16.07	Q, PR
2	Dong Hongjiao	China	16.27	Q
3	Manuela Schar	Switzerland	16.62	Q
4	Yvonne Sehmisch	Germany	17.28	q
5	Jennifer Goeckel	United States	18.21	
6	Gloria Sanchez	Mexico	18.40	

==== Heat 2 ====
Rank	Name	Nationality	Time	Notes
1	Liu Wenjun	China	16.20	Q
2	Zhang Ting	China	16.42	Q
3	Tatyana McFadden	United States	16.71	Q
4	Madison de Rozario	Australia	17.44	q
5	Chen Yu Lien	Chinese Taipei	17.83	
6	Yazmith Bataz	Mexico	18.15	
7	Masouda Siffi	Tunisia	18.16	

=== Final ===
Competed at 20:45.

Rank	Name	Nationality	Time	Notes
1st place, gold medalist(s)	Chantal Petitclerc	Canada	16.15	
2nd place, silver medalist(s)	Liu Wenjun	China	16.20	
3rd place, bronze medalist(s)	Dong Hongjiao	China	16.24	
4	Manuela Schar	Switzerland	16.35	
5	Zhang Ting	China	16.61	
6	Tatyana McFadden	United States	16.62	
7	Yvonne Sehmisch	Germany	17.08	
8	Madison de Rozario	Australia	17.21	

Q = qualified for final by place. q = qualified by time. PR = Paralympic Record.
