= Gao Changlong =

Chinese Paralympic athlete

Personal information
- Born: 5 April 1982 (age 44)

Sport
- Sport: Paralympic athletics
Medal record
Paralympic athletics
Representing China
Paralympic Games
Bronze medal – third place	2008 Beijing	Javelin throw F42–44
World Para Athletics Championships
Silver medal – second place	2011 Christchurch	Javelin throw F44
Asian Para Games
Silver medal – second place	2010 Guangzhou	Javelin throw F44

Gao Changlong (born 5 April 1982) is a Paralympian athlete from China competing mainly in category F42–44 javelin throw events.

He competed in the 2008 Summer Paralympics in Beijing, China. There he won a bronze medal in the men's F42–44 javelin throw event.
