= Athletics at the 2008 Summer Paralympics – Men's javelin throw F55–56 =

Sporting event

Men's Javelin F55/56 at the XIII Paralympic Games
- Venue: Beijing National Stadium
- Dates: 9 September
- Competitors: 6 from 6 nations
- Winning distance: 42.27

Medalists
1st place, gold medalist(s)		Pieter Gruijters	Netherlands
2nd place, silver medalist(s)		Zhang Yingbin	China
3rd place, bronze medalist(s)		Yaser Abdelaziz El Sayed	Egypt

The men's javelin F55/56 event at the 2008 Summer Paralympics took place at the Beijing National Stadium at 17:55 on 9 September. There was a single round of competition, and as there were only 6 entrants they took 6 throws each. The competition was won by Pieter Gruijters, representing Netherlands.

== Results ==
Rank	Athlete	Nationality	Cl.	1	2	3	4	5	6	Best	Pts.	Notes
1st place, gold medalist(s)	Pieter Gruijters	Netherlands	F56	x	41.95	42.27	37.86	33.92	38.20	42.27	1159	WR
2nd place, silver medalist(s)	Zhang Yingbin	China	F55	31.78	32.70	32.55	x	31.18	31.96	32.70	994	SB
3rd place, bronze medalist(s)	Yaser Abdelaziz El Sayed	Egypt	F55	28.15	30.19	x	28.84	30.54	12.15	30.54	929	SB
4	Josef Stiak	Czech Republic	F56	30.50	30.96	31.20	29.30	31.88	31.26	31.88	874	
5	Leonardo Diaz	Cuba	F56	27.03	26.52	30.70	29.08	27.30	28.95	30.70	842	SB
6	Karol Kozun	Poland	F55	x	22.80	26.69	x	x	26.67	26.69	812	

WR = World Record. SB = Seasonal Best.
