= Yaser Abdelaziz El Sayed =

Egyptian Paralympic athlete

Medal record

Paralympic athletics

Representing Egypt

Paralympic Games
Bronze medal – third place	2008 Beijing	Javelin Throw - F55-56

IPC World Championships
Bronze medal – third place	2017 London	Javelin throw - F55

Yaser Abdelaziz El Sayed is a Paralympian athlete from Egypt competing mainly in category F55-56 javelin throw events.

He competed in the 2008 Summer Paralympics in Beijing, China. There he won a bronze medal in the men's F55-56 javelin throw event.
