= Athletics at the 2004 Summer Paralympics – Men's long jump F36–38 =

Men's Long Jump F36-38 at the XII Paralympic Games
- Venue: Athens Olympic Stadium
- Dates: 20 September 2004
- Competitors: 11 from 8 nations
- Winning distance: 6.06

Medalists
1st place, gold medalist(s)		Guo Wei	China
2nd place, silver medalist(s)		Fu Xin Han	China
3rd place, bronze medalist(s)		Darren Thrupp	Australia

The Men's long jump F36-38 events for athletes with cerebral palsy was held at the 2004 Summer Paralympics in the Athens Olympic Stadium. It was won by Guo Wei, representing China.

20 Sept. 2004, 17:00

Rank	Athlete	Result	Points	Notes
1st place, gold medalist(s)	Guo Wei (CHN)	6.06	1196	WR
2nd place, silver medalist(s)	Fu Xin Han (CHN)	5.58	1102	
3rd place, bronze medalist(s)	Darren Thrupp (AUS)	5.98	1033	WR
4	Andriy Zhyltsov (UKR)	5.17	1021	
5	Mariusz Sobczak (POL)	4.96	979	
6	Serhiy Norenko (UKR)	4.90	967	
7	Fares Hamdi (TUN)	5.48	947	
8	Christer Lenander (SWE)	5.59	929	
9	Jens Wiegmann (GER)	5.19	897	
10	Nasrullah Khan (PAK)	4.88	843	
11	Zubair Khan (PAK)	3.98	687	
