= Athletics at the 2008 Summer Paralympics – Men's long jump F46 =

Men's Long Jump F46 at the XIII Paralympic Games
- Venue: Beijing National Stadium
- Dates: 10 September
- Competitors: 10 from 9 nations
- Winning distance: 7.23

Medalists
1st place, gold medalist(s)		Arnaud Assoumani	France
2nd place, silver medalist(s)		David Roos	South Africa
3rd place, bronze medalist(s)		Li Kangyong	China

The men's long jump F46 event at the 2008 Summer Paralympics took place at the Beijing National Stadium at 17:55 on 10 September. There was a single round of competition; after the first three jumps, only the top eight had 3 further jumps. The competition was won by Arnaud Assoumani, representing France.

== Results ==
Rank	Athlete	Nationality	1	2	3	4	5	6	Best	Notes
1st place, gold medalist(s)	Arnaud Assoumani	France	7.12	7.23	x	x	5.63	7.14	7.23	WR
2nd place, silver medalist(s)	David Roos	South Africa	6.37	6.36	6.57	5.92	6.41	6.64	6.64	SB
3rd place, bronze medalist(s)	Li Kangyong	China	6.61	x	6.57	6.46	x	6.53	6.61	SB
4	Ettiam Calderon	Cuba	6.48	6.09	6.38	6.48	6.36	5.57	6.48	SB
5	Aliaksandr Subota	Belarus	6.28	6.46	x	6.40	6.45	6.43	6.46	SB
6	Wu Yancong	China	5.72	6.36	6.42	6.27	x	x	6.42	
7	Jagseer Singh	India	5.89	5.98	6.02	6.02	6.40	x	6.40	
8	David Bravo	Spain	6.05	x	5.59	5.91	x	5.55	6.05	SB
9	Mose Faatamala	Samoa	x	x	5.28	-	-	-	5.28	
	Lucas Schoenfeld	Argentina	x	x	x	-	-	-		

WR = World Record. SB = Seasonal Best.
