= Zhang Yingbin =

Chinese Paralympic athlete

Medal record

Men's para-athletics

Representing China

Paralympic Games
Silver medal – second place	2008 Beijing	Javelin throw F55-56
Bronze medal – third place	2004 Athens	Javelin throw F55-56

Zhang Ying Bin is a paralympic athlete from China competing mainly in category F55 javelin events.

Zhang Ying Bin competed in the 2004 Summer Paralympics in Athens, Greece winning the bronze medal in the combined F55-56 class javelin.

In the 2008 Summer Paralympics in Beijing, China, he won a silver medal in the men's F55-56 javelin throw event.
