= Athletics at the 2008 Summer Paralympics – Men's javelin throw F42/44 =

The Men's Javelin Throw F42/44 had its Final held on September 12 at 19:00.

== Medalists ==
Gold	Mingjie Gao; China
Silver	Evgeny Gudkov; Russia
Bronze	Changlong Gao; China

== Results ==
Place	Athlete	Class	1	2	3	4	5	6	Best	Points
1	Mingjie Gao (CHN)	F44	56.83	x	57.02	57.60	x	x	57.60 WR	1057
2	Evgeny Gudkov (RUS)	F44	54.01	55.50	x	47.28	51.20	x	55.50	1018
3	Changlong Gao (CHN)	F44	46.36	52.04	53.81	54.17	55.30	52.43	55.30	1015
4	Ronald Hertog (NED)	F44	50.79	51.41	50.97	51.69	49.92	50.41	51.69	949
5	Jeff Skiba (USA)	F44	48.34	51.46	x	48.22	45.39	x	51.46	944
6	Silao Ha (CHN)	F44	49.26	50.73	x	49.80	47.77	50.38	50.73	931
7	Dechko Ovcharov (BUL)	F42	45.54	45.14	43.44	44.69	45.07	42.77	45.54	919
8	Lukasz Kaluziak (POL)	F44	47.51	47.95	49.57	49.46	49.00	48.53	49.57	910
9	Maksym Solyankin (UKR)	F44	49.30	46.21	44.45				49.30	905
10	Runar Steinstad (NOR)	F42	42.64	44.55	43.39				44.55	899
11	Tony Falelavaki (FRA)	F44	48.75	48.20	45.87				48.75	895
12	Jos van der Donk (NED)	F42	43.41	43.08	42.47				43.41	876
13	Wijesinghe Adikari (SRI)	F44	42.65	45.34	46.30				46.30	850
14	Urs Kolly (SUI)	F44	39.68	37.55	-				39.68	728
