= Liu Xiangkun =

Chinese Paralympic athlete

Medal record

Paralympic athletics

Representing China

Paralympic Games
Gold medal – first place	2008 Beijing	4x100 metre relay - T11-13

Liu Xiangkun is a paralympic athlete from China competing mainly in category T11 sprint events.

At the 2008 Summer Paralympics Liu competed individually in the T11 100m and 200m but it was in the 4 × 100 m where Liu and his teammates won the gold medal in the T11-13 class.
