= Dong Hongjiao =

Chinese Paralympic athlete

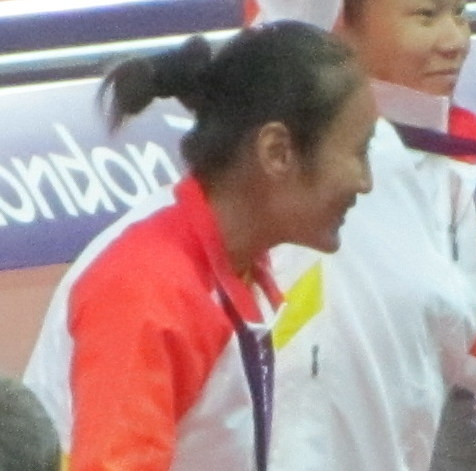
- Dong in 2012

Personal information
- Native name: 董红娇
- Born: 28 April 1986 (age 40) Hubei, China
Medal record
Track and field (T54)
Representing China
Paralympic Games
Gold medal – first place	2008 Beijing	4x100m T53/54
Silver medal – second place	2012 London	100m T54
Silver medal – second place	2012 London	400m T54
Bronze medal – third place	2008 Beijing	100m T54
World Championships
Gold medal – first place	2011 Christchurch	100m T54
Asian Para Games
Gold medal – first place	2014 Incheon	200m T54
Bronze medal – third place	2010 Guangzhou	100m T54

Dong Hongjiao ( Chinese: 董红娇)(born 28 April 1986) is a Paralympic athlete from China competing mainly in category T54 sprint events.

She competed in the 2008 Summer Paralympics in Beijing, China. There she won a gold medal in the women's 4 x 100 metre relay - T53/54 event, a bronze medal in the women's 100 metres - T54 event and finished fifth in the women's 400 metres - T54 event

She took two silver medals in the 2012 Summer Paralympics in London.
