= Gao Mingjie =

Chinese Paralympic athlete

Personal information
- Born: 23 November 1980 (age 45) Shangri-La City, China

Sport
- Sport: Paralympic athletics
Medal record
Paralympic athletics
Representing China
Paralympic Games
Silver medal – second place	2004 Athens	Javelin throw – F44/46
Gold medal – first place	2008 Beijing	Javelin throw – F42–44
Gold medal – first place	2012 London	Javelin throw – F44
World Para Athletics Championships
Gold medal – first place	2006 Assen	Javelin throw F44
Gold medal – first place	2011 Christchurch	Javelin throw F44
Asian Para Games
Gold medal – first place	2010 Guangzhou	Javelin throw F44
Bronze medal – third place	2010 Guangzhou	Discus throw F44

Gao Mingjie (Chinese: 高明杰; pinyin: Gāo Míngjié; born November 23, 1980, in Shangri-La City) is a Paralympian athlete from China competing mainly in category F42–44 javelin throw events.

Gao competed in the 2004 Summer Paralympics in Athens, Greece and won a silver medal in the men's F44–46 javelin throw event. At the 2008 Summer Paralympics in Beijing, China he won a gold medal in the men's F42–44 javelin throw event. Four years later he won a second gold, in the javelin throw (T44) at the 2012 Summer Paralympics in London.
