= Li Kangyong =

Chinese Paralympic athlete

Medal record

Track and field (athletics)

Representing China

Paralympic Games
| Bronze medal – third place | 2008 Beijing | Long Jump - F46 |

Li Kangyong is a Paralympian athlete from China competing mainly in category F46 long jump events.

He competed in the 2008 Summer Paralympics in Beijing, China. There he won a bronze medal in the men's F46 long jump event.
