= Paweł Piotrowski =

Polish Paralympic athlete (born 1985)

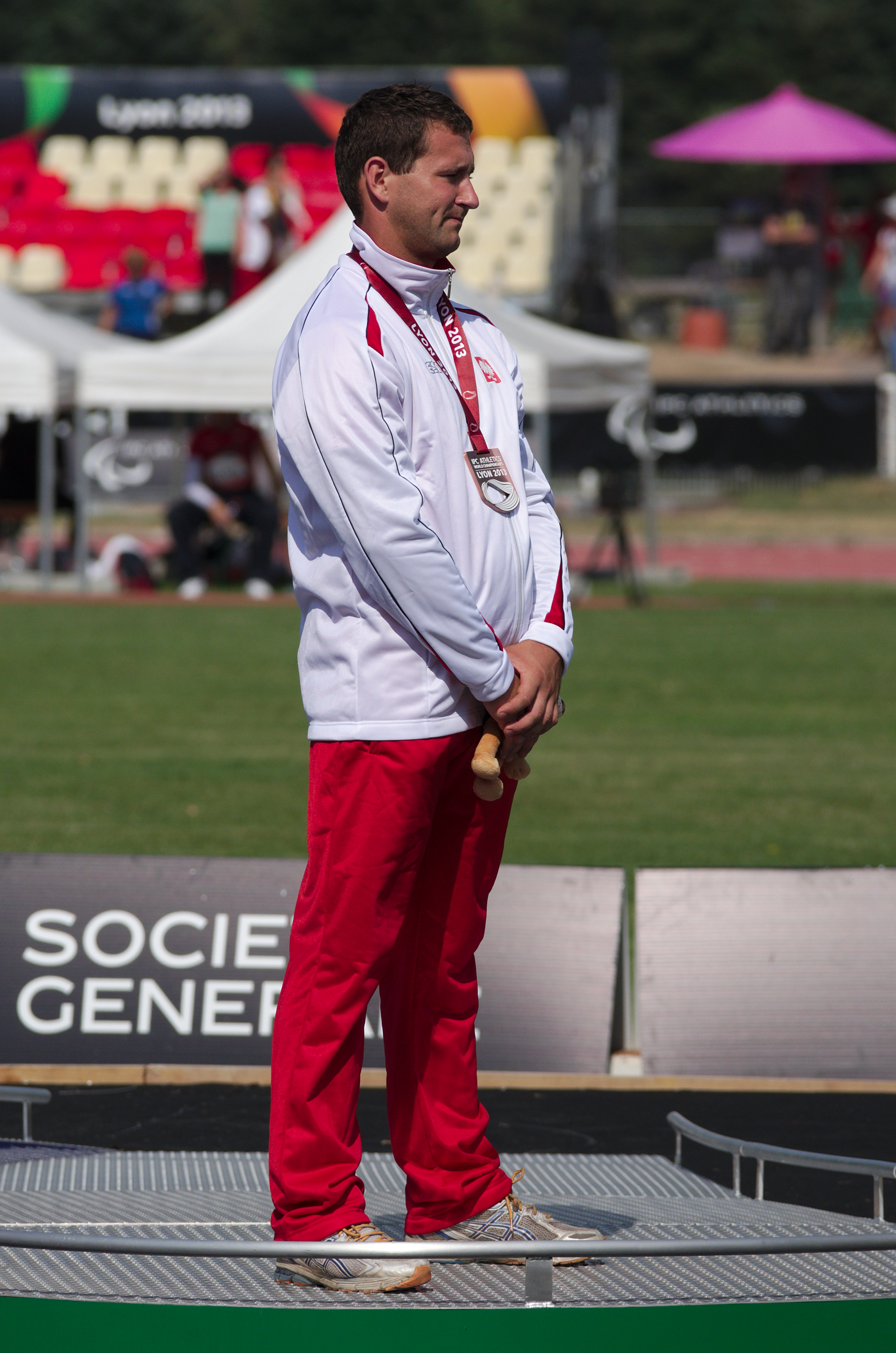
- Piotrowski receiving his bronze at the 2013 World Championships

Personal information
- Nationality: Polish
- Born: 24 September 1985 (age 40)

Sport
- Country: Poland
- Sport: Paralympic athletics
- Disability class: F36
- Event: Throwing events
Medal record
Event	1st	2nd	3rd
Paralympic Games	1	2	1
World Championships	3	0	1
European Championships	1	0	2
Paralympic athletics
Representing Poland
Paralympic Games
Gold medal – first place	2004 Athens	Shot Put – F36
Silver medal – second place	2004 Athens	Javelin – F36/38
Silver medal – second place	2008 Beijing	Javelin – F35/36
Bronze medal – third place	2008 Beijing	Shot put – F35/36
IPC World Championships
Gold medal – first place	2011 Christchurch	Discus – F35/36
Gold medal – first place	2011 Christchurch	Javelin – F35/36
Gold medal – first place	2011 Christchurch	Shot put – F35/36
Bronze medal – third place	2013 Lyon	Shot put – F36
IPC European Championships
Gold medal – first place	2012 Stadskanaal	Shot put – F35/36
Bronze medal – third place	2014 Swansea	Shot put – F36
Bronze medal – third place	2016 Grosseto	Shot put – F36

Paweł Piotrowski (born 24 September 1985) is a Paralympian athlete from Poland competing mainly in category F35–36 throwing events.

Paweł competed in the shot put, discus and javelin in both the 2004 and 2008 summer Paralympics. He won the gold medal in the F36 shot and the silver in the F36/38 javelin in 2004 and in 2008 he won the silver in the F35/36 javelin and the bronze in the F35/36 shot put.
