= Guo Wei (parathlete) =

Chinese Paralympic athlete (born 1982)

Personal information
- Born: 2 July 1982 (age 43) Shanghai, China
Medal record
Men's para-athletics
Representing China
Paralympic Games
Gold medal – first place	2004 Athens	Long Jump – F36/38
Gold medal – first place	2004 Athens	Shot Put – F35
Gold medal – first place	2004 Athens	Javelin throw F35/36
Gold medal – first place	2008 Beijing	Discus Throw – F35/36
Gold medal – first place	2008 Beijing	Javelin Throw – F35/36
Gold medal – first place	2008 Beijing	Shot Put – F35/36
World Para Athletics Championships
Gold medal – first place	2006 Assen	Discus throw F35
Gold medal – first place	2006 Assen	Javelin throw F35-36/38
Gold medal – first place	2006 Assen	Shot put F35
Bronze medal – third place	2011 Christchurch	Javelin throw F35-36
Bronze medal – third place	2011 Christchurch	Shot put F35-36
Asian Para Games
Gold medal – first place	2010 Guangzhou	Javelin throw F35-36
Silver medal – second place	2010 Guangzhou	Discus throw F35-36

Guo Wei (born 2 July 1982) is a Chinese Paralympic athlete competing mainly in category F35 field events.

== Biography ==
Guo is a six time Paralympic gold medalist. He competed in the 2004 Summer Paralympics in Athens, Greece where he won the F35 javelin, shot put and the F36-38 long jump. He continued this trend in Beijing, China at the 2008 Summer Paralympics with a clean sweep of the throwing gold medals in the F35/36 class.

He holds F35 world records in long jump, shot put, discus and javelin.
