= Zhang Ting (athlete) =

Chinese Paralympic athlete

Personal information
- Native name: 张婷
- Born: 16 February 1985 (age 41)

Sport
- Sport: Paralympic athletics
Medal record
Paralympic athletics
Representing China
Paralympic Games
Gold medal – first place	2008 Beijing	4 x 100 metres relay T53-54
Asian Para Games
Gold medal – first place	2010 Guangzhou	100m T54
Gold medal – first place	2010 Guangzhou	200m T54

Zhang Ting (Chinese: 张婷; pinyin: Zhāng Tíng) is a Paralympian athlete from China competing mainly in category T54 sprint events.

She competed in the 2008 Summer Paralympics in Beijing, China. There she won a gold medal in the women's T53-54 4 x 100 metres relay as part of the Chinese team. She also competed in the T54 100m and 200m finishing fifth and fourth respectively
