= Fu Xinhan =

Chinese Paralympic athlete

Personal information
- Nationality: Chinese
- Born: 27 November 1984 (age 41) Shanghai, China

Sport
- Sport: Para-athletics
- Disability class: F35
Medal record
Men's para-athletics
Representing China
Paralympic Games
Gold medal – first place	2016 Rio de Janeiro	Shot put F35
Silver medal – second place	2004 Athens	Long jump F36-38
Silver medal – second place	2004 Athens	Discus throw F35
Silver medal – second place	2008 Beijing	100m T35
Silver medal – second place	2012 London	200m T35
Bronze medal – third place	2012 London	100m T35
Bronze medal – third place	2020 Tokyo	Shot put F35
World Championships
Gold medal – first place	2017 London	Shot put F35
Silver medal – second place	2006 Assen	100m T35
Silver medal – second place	2019 Dubai	Shot put F35
Bronze medal – third place	2006 Assen	4x100m relay T35-38
Bronze medal – third place	2006 Assen	Discus throw F35
Bronze medal – third place	2006 Assen	Shot put F35
Bronze medal – third place	2015 Doha	200m T35
Bronze medal – third place	2023 Paris	Shot put F35
Bronze medal – third place	2024 Kobe	Shot put F35
Bronze medal – third place	2025 New Delhi	Shot put F35
Asian Para Games
Silver medal – second place	2022 Hangzhou	Shot put F35
Bronze medal – third place	2018 Jakarta	Shot put F35

Fu Xinhan (Chinese: 傅昕瀚; pinyin: Fù Xīnhàn; born November 27, 1984) is a Paralympian athlete from China competing mainly in category T35 sprint and F35 throwing events.

== Career ==
Xinhan competed in the 2004 Summer Paralympics in the shot put, he also won silvers in the F35 discus and the long jump for less severely disabled athletes in the F36-38 category.

He competed in the 2008 Summer Paralympics in Beijing, China. There he won a silver medal in the men's 100 metres - F35 event, finished tenth in the men's Discus throw - F35/36 event and finished eighth in the men's Shot put - F35/36 event
