= Tian Rong =

Qi aristocrat and rebel leader during the Chu–Han Contention

- 田榮
- Born: Unknown; Linzi, State of Qi (modern Zibo, Shandong)
- Died: 203 BC; Lixia, Qi (modern Jinan, Shandong)
- Occupation: Military leader
- Relatives: Tian Dan (cousin); Tian Heng (younger brother)

Tian Rong (Chinese: 田榮; pinyin: Tián Róng; died 203 BC) was a member of the Tian royal house of Qi who led a rebellion against the Qin dynasty during the Late Qin peasant rebellions, and later against Xiang Yu during the Chu–Han Contention. Rejecting Xiang Yu's partition of his ancestral land into three puppet kingdoms, Tian Rong overthrew the new rulers, restored a united Qi state, and proclaimed himsel king. He later opposed the Han armies of Liu Bang and was killed by the Han general Han Xin in 203 BC.

== Revolt against Qin ==
In October 208 BC, Tian Rong, together with his cousin Tian Dan (田儋) and his younger brother Tian Heng, responded to Chen Sheng uprising and killed the local county magistrate. Tian Dan proclaimed himself King of Qi and occupied the entire former Qi territory.

In June 208 BC, Qin general Zhang Han killed Tian Dan. The Qi people then supported Tian Jia (田假), the younger brother of Tian Jian, the king. Tian Rong raised an army to expel Tian Jia, who fled to Chu.

== Revolt against Xiang Yu ==
Tian Rong made Tian Dan's son Tian Fu (田巿) the King of Qi and asked Chu to hand over Tian Jia, but Chu ignored him. Moreover, when Xiang Yu established the Eighteen Kingdoms, he divided Qi into Qi, Jiaodong, and Jibei, appointing Tian Du (田都), Tian Fu, and Tian An (田安) as kings. Tian Rong was not enfeoffed. Dissatisfied with this, Tian Rong rose up in rebellion against Xiang Yu.

When Liu Bang's anti-Chu coalition rose in 205 BC, Tian Rong revolted. He killed Tian Fu, Tian An, and forced Tian Du out of Linzi. Tian Rong reunified most of the former kingdom and proclaimed himself king.

== War with Han ==
Late in 205 BC Xiang Yu counter-attacked, retaking Linzi. The Qi court fled north to Gaomi and then to Jimo while Tian Rong waged guerrilla war. Although Xiang Yu soon withdrew to face Liu Bang, Qi's strength was diminished.

=== Han Xin’s invasion ===
In winter 204 BC the Han general Han Xin launched a surprise campaign: feigning a western advance, he crossed the Yellow River near present-day Dezhou and seized Linzi. Caught off-guard, Tian Rong marched hastily west but was ambushed and defeated at Lixia (歷下). He was killed in the rout, either by Han scouts or by defectors seeking favor with Han Xin.

== Aftermath ==
Tian Rong's death shattered Qi resistance. Tian Jia briefly held Jimo but was captured in 202 BC; Han Xin became King of Qi under Liu Bang. The last Tian claimant, Tian Heng, fled east and conducted maritime raids until suppressed in 196 BC.

== Legacy ==
Though unsuccessful, Tian Rong is remembered in Shandong folklore as a patriot who sought to restore his ancestral state. His revolt illustrates regional resistance to both Chu hegemony and Han unification during the inter-dynastic period.
