= Swen Michaelis =

German wheelchair rugby

Personal information
- Born: 31 March 1981 (age 45) Chemnitz, East Germany

Sport
- Country: Germany
- Sport: Paralympic swimming Wheelchair rugby
- Disability: Dysmonia
Medal record
Paralympic swimming
Representing Germany
Paralympic Games
Silver medal – second place	2000 Sydney	100m backstroke S6
Bronze medal – third place	2004 Athens	200m individual medley SM6
World Championships
Gold medal – first place	1998 Christchurch	4x50m medley relay
Bronze medal – third place	1998 Christchurch	50m freestyle S6
Bronze medal – third place	1998 Christchurch	4x50m freestyle relay
Bronze medal – third place	2006 Durban	400m freestyle S6

Swen Michaelis (born 31 March 1981) is a German wheelchair rugby player and former Paralympic swimmer. He was a two-time Paralympic medalist and a World champion in swimming. He now competes in Germany national wheelchair rugby team.
