= Wang Wenbo =

Chinese Paralympic athlete

Personal information
- Born: 2 February 1969 (age 57) Changchun, China

Sport
- Sport: Paralympic athletics
Medal record
Paralympic athletics
Representing China
Paralympic Games
Silver medal – second place	2008 Beijing	Discus throw – F35/36
Bronze medal – third place	2012 London	Discus throw – F35/36
Asian Para Games
Gold medal – first place	2010 Guangzhou	Discus throw F35/36

Wang Wenbo (Chinese: 王文波; pinyin: Wáng Wénbō; born 2 February 1969 in Changchun) is a Paralympic athlete from China. He competes in standing throwing events, in the F36 classification for athletes with cerebral palsy. He was a former discus world record holder in his class.

At the 2008 Summer Paralympics, competing in a combined F35/36 discus event, he set a world record for F36 classified athletes but still only won a silver medal. He also competed in javelin and shot put. At the 2012 Summer Paralympics he won bronze in the F35/36 discus event.
