= Cuba at the 2008 Summer Paralympics =

- IPC code: CUB
- NPC: Comité Paralimpico Cubano

in Beijing
- Competitors: 32 in 5 sports
- Flag bearer: Yunidis Castillo
- Medals Ranked 23rd: Gold 5 Silver 3 Bronze 6 Total 14

Summer Paralympics appearances (overview)
- 1992; 1996; 2000; 2004; 2008; 2012; 2016; 2020; 2024

Cuba competed at the 2008 Summer Paralympics in Beijing, China. The country's delegation consisted of 32 competitors in athletics, judo, powerlifting, swimming, and table tennis. The competitors came from 13 different provinces and were mostly first-year university students.

== Medalists ==
Medal	Name	Sport	Event
Gold	Luis Manuel Galano	Athletics	Men's 400 metres T13
Gold	Leonardo Diaz	Athletics	Men's discus throw F55-56
Gold	Yunidis Castillo	Athletics	Women's 100 metres T46
Gold	Yunidis Castillo	Athletics	Women's 200 metres T46
Gold	Isao Cruz	Judo	Men's 81 kg
Silver	Freddy Durruthy	Athletics	Men's 400 metres T13
Silver	Lazaro Raschid Aguilar	Athletics	Men's 800 metres T12
Silver	Lazaro Raschid Aguilar	Athletics	Men's 1500 metres T13
Bronze	Luis Felipe Gutierrez	Athletics	Men's 100 metres T13
Bronze	Arian Iznaga	Athletics	Men's 200 metres T11
Bronze	Ettiam Calderon	Athletics	Men's 200 metres T46
Bronze	Gerdan Fonseca	Athletics	Men's shot put F44
Bronze	Victor Sanchez	Judo	Men's 66 kg
Bronze	Juan Carlos Cortada	Judo	Men's 100 kg

== Sports ==
=== Athletics ===
==== Men's track ====
Athlete	Class	Event	Heats		Semifinal		Final	
Athlete	Class	Event	Result	Rank	Result	Rank	Result	Rank
Yuniesky Abreu	T13	1500m	4:15.08	12	did not advance			
Ernesto Blanco	T46	800m	2:00.05	10	did not advance			
Ernesto Blanco	T46	1500m	4:20.77	23	did not advance			
Ettiam Calderon	T46	100m	11.21	6 Q	—N/a		11.57	8
Ettiam Calderon	T46	200m	22.78	4 Q	—N/a		22.42	3rd place, bronze medalist(s)
Freddy Durruthy	T13	200m	22.45	6 q	—N/a		22.51	6
Freddy Durruthy	T13	400m	49.92	2 Q	—N/a		49.52	2nd place, silver medalist(s)
Luis Manuel Galano	T13	200m	22.04	3 Q	—N/a		22.00	4
Luis Manuel Galano	T13	400m	49.28 PR	1 Q	—N/a		49.12 PR	1st place, gold medalist(s)
Diosmany Gonzalez	T12	10000m	—N/a				DNF	
Diosmany Gonzalez	T12	Marathon	—N/a				2:39:41	11
Luis Felipe Gutiérrez	T13	100m	11.12	3 Q	—N/a		10.98	3rd place, bronze medalist(s)
Luis Felipe Gutiérrez	T13	200m	22.04	3 Q	—N/a		22.31	5
Arián Iznaga	T11	200m	22.91	1 Q	22.95	3 Q	22.79	3rd place, bronze medalist(s)
Arián Iznaga	T11	400m	DNS		did not advance			
Lazaro Raschid Aguilar	T12	800m	1:56.98	4 Q	—N/a		1:52.40	2nd place, silver medalist(s)
Lazaro Raschid Aguilar	T13	1500m	4:01.18	2 Q	—N/a		4:06.40	2nd place, silver medalist(s)
Lazaro Raschid Aguilar	T13	5000m	DNF		did not advance			
Felix Rice	T11	100m	11.49	5 q	11.65	9	did not advance	
Felix Rice	T11	200m	24.14	11 q	24.64	11	did not advance	
Julio Roque	T12	100m	11.19	4 q	11.13	4 B	30.91	4

==== Men's field ====
Athlete	Class	Event	Final		
Athlete	Class	Event	Result	Points	Rank
Ettiam Calderon	F46	Long jump	6.48 SB	-	4
Leonardo Diaz	F55-56	Discus throw	40.87 WR	1061	1st place, gold medalist(s)
Leonardo Diaz	F55-56	Javelin throw	30.70 SB	842	5
Leonardo Diaz	F55-56	Shot put	10.10 SB	870	14
Erick Figueredo	F55-56	Shot put	8.11	716	16
Gerdan Fonseca	F44	Discus throw	41.26	763	10
Gerdan Fonseca	F44	Shot put	15.65	977	3rd place, bronze medalist(s)

==== Women's track ====
Athlete	Class	Event	Heats		Semifinal		Final	
Athlete	Class	Event	Result	Rank	Result	Rank	Result	Rank
Yunidis Castillo	T46	100m	12.22	1 Q	—N/a		12.04 WR	1st place, gold medalist(s)
Yunidis Castillo	T46	200m	25.35	1 Q	—N/a		24.72 WR	1st place, gold medalist(s)
Omara Durand	T13	100m	12.65	4 Q	—N/a		12.59	6
Omara Durand	T13	200m	25.97	2 Q	—N/a		25.67	4
Omara Durand	T13	400m	59.38	6 Q	—N/a		DNF	
Daineris Mijan	T12	100m	12.93	5 Q	12.99	8 B	13.05	4
Daineris Mijan	T12	200m	DNS		did not advance			

==== Women's field ====
Athlete	Class	Event	Final		
Athlete	Class	Event	Result	Points	Rank
Daineris Mijan	F12	Long jump	5.71	-	4

=== Judo ===
==== Men ====
Athlete	Event	First Round	Quarterfinals	Semifinals	Repechage round 1	Repechage round 2	Final/ Bronze medal contest
Athlete	Event	Opposition Result	Opposition Result	Opposition Result	Opposition Result	Opposition Result	Opposition Result
Juan Carlos Cortada	Men's 100kg	Rollo (FRA); W 1000-0000	Vlasov (RUS); W 1001-0000	Sardarov (AZE); L 0000-1000	—N/a		Porter (USA); W 1000-0000 (bronze)
Isao Cruz	Men's 81kg	Bye	Oga (JPN); W 0010-0000	Lencina (ARG); W 1101-0001	—N/a		Jonard (FRA); W 0010-0000 (gold)
Jorge Hierrezuelo	Men's 73kg	Kurbanov (RUS); W 1012-0001	Avila (MEX); L 0000-0020	—N/a		Pourabbas (IRI); W 1011-0000	Sydorenko (UKR); L H
Yargaliny Jiminez	Men's +100kg	Dewall (USA); L 0000-1000	did not advance				
Sergio Perez	Men's 60kg	—N/a	Rahmati (ALG); L 0010–0100	—N/a	Borges (URU); W 0200-0000	Quilter (GBR); L 0000-1000	Did not advance
Victor Sanchez	Men's 66kg	Falcon (VEN); W 1102-0000	Harris (GBR); W 1001-0000	Fujimoto (JPN); L H	—N/a		Karpeniuk (UKR); W 0120-0000 (bronze)

==== Women ====
Athlete	Event	First Round	Quarterfinals	Semifinals	Repechage round 1	Repechage round 2	Final/ Bronze medal contest
Athlete	Event	Opposition Result	Opposition Result	Opposition Result	Opposition Result	Opposition Result	Opposition Result
Maria Gonzalez	Women's 48kg	Akatsuka (JPN); W 1000–0000	Medjeded (FRA); W 0002-0000	Cardoso (BRA); L 0001-0002	—N/a		Brussig (GER); L 0000-1000

=== Powerlifting ===
Athlete	Event	Result	Rank
Luis Perea	67.5kg	180.0	7
Cesar Rubio	52kg	135.0	10

=== Swimming ===
==== Men ====
Athlete	Class	Event	Heats		Final	
Athlete	Class	Event	Result	Rank	Result	Rank
Adonis Leon	S11	100m butterfly	1:24.50	13	did not advance	
Adonis Leon	SB11	100m breaststroke	1:22.40	8 Q	1:22.74	8

=== Table tennis ===
==== Men ====
Athlete	Event	Preliminaries				Quarterfinals	Semifinals	Final / BM	
Athlete	Event	Opposition Result	Opposition Result	Opposition Result	Rank	Opposition Result	Opposition Result	Opposition Result	Rank
Yunier Fernandez	Men's singles C1	Cho J K (KOR); L 2–3	Vevera (AUT); L 0–3	Kilger (GER); W 3–0	3	did not advance			
Isvel Trujillo	Men's singles C1	Lee H K (KOR); L 0-3	Ducay (FRA); L 0-3	Nikelis (GER); L 0-3	4	did not advance			
Erich Manso	Men's singles C9-10	de la Bourdonnaye (FRA); L 0-3	Lukyanov (RUS); L 1-3	—N/a	3	did not advance			
Yunier Fernandez; Isvel Trujillo	Men's team C1-2	—N/a				Slovakia (SVK); L 0-3	did not advance		

==== Women ====
Athlete	Event	Preliminaries				Quarterfinals	Semifinals	Final / BM	
Athlete	Event	Opposition Result	Opposition Result	Opposition Result	Rank	Opposition Result	Opposition Result	Opposition Result	Rank
Yanelis Silva	Women's singles C3	Li Q (CHN); L 0–3	Choi H J (KOR); L 0–3	Reynolds (IRL); W 3–2	3	did not advance			

== See also ==
- Cuba at the Paralympics
- Cuba at the 2008 Summer Olympics
