= Athletics at the 2008 Summer Paralympics – Men's 200 metres T13 =

The Men's 200m T13 had its First Round held on September 15 at 9:46 and its Final on September 16 at 19:28.

== Medalists ==
Gold	Jason Smyth; Ireland
Silver	Alexey Labzin; Russia
Bronze	Vugar Mehdiyev; Azerbaijan

== Results ==
Place	Athlete	Round 1	Final
1	Jason Smyth (IRL)	21.81 Q WR	21.43 WR
2	Alexey Labzin (RUS)	21.86 Q	21.87
3	Vugar Mehdiyev (AZE)	22.19 Q	22.00
4	Luis Manuel Galano (CUB)	22.04 Q	22.00
5	Luis Felipe Gutierrez (CUB)	22.04 Q	22.31
6	Freddy Durruthy (CUB)	22.45 q	22.51
7	Ioannis Protos (GRE)	22.60 q	22.74
8	Jonathan Ntutu (RSA)	22.71 Q	22.85
9	Royal Mitchell (USA)	22.73	
10	Neil Fachie (GBR)	23.17	
11	Radoslav Zlatanov (BUL)	23.22	
12	Mohammed Fannouna (PLE)	23.48	
13	Per Jonsson (SWE)	23.73	
14	Marc Lembeck (GER)	24.43	
	Andre Luiz Andrade (BRA)	DSQ	
