= Palestine at the 2012 Summer Paralympics =

- Palestinian flag
- IPC code: PLE
- NPC: Palestinian Paralympic Committee

in London
- Competitors: 2 in 1 sport
- Medals: Gold 0 Silver 0 Bronze 0 Total 0

Summer Paralympics appearances (overview)
- 2000; 2004; 2008; 2012; 2016; 2020; 2024

The Palestinian Territories competed as Palestine at the 2012 Summer Paralympics in London, United Kingdom, from August 29 to September 9.

The country was represented by two athletes, both in field events in athletics. Khamis Zaqout, a wheelchair athlete, competed in the discus, javelin and shot put. He had been described as Palestine's "best hope for a Paralympic medal in London". Mohammed Fannouna, who is partially sighted, competed in the long jump; he won a bronze medal in the 2004 Paralympics in Athens.

== Athletics ==
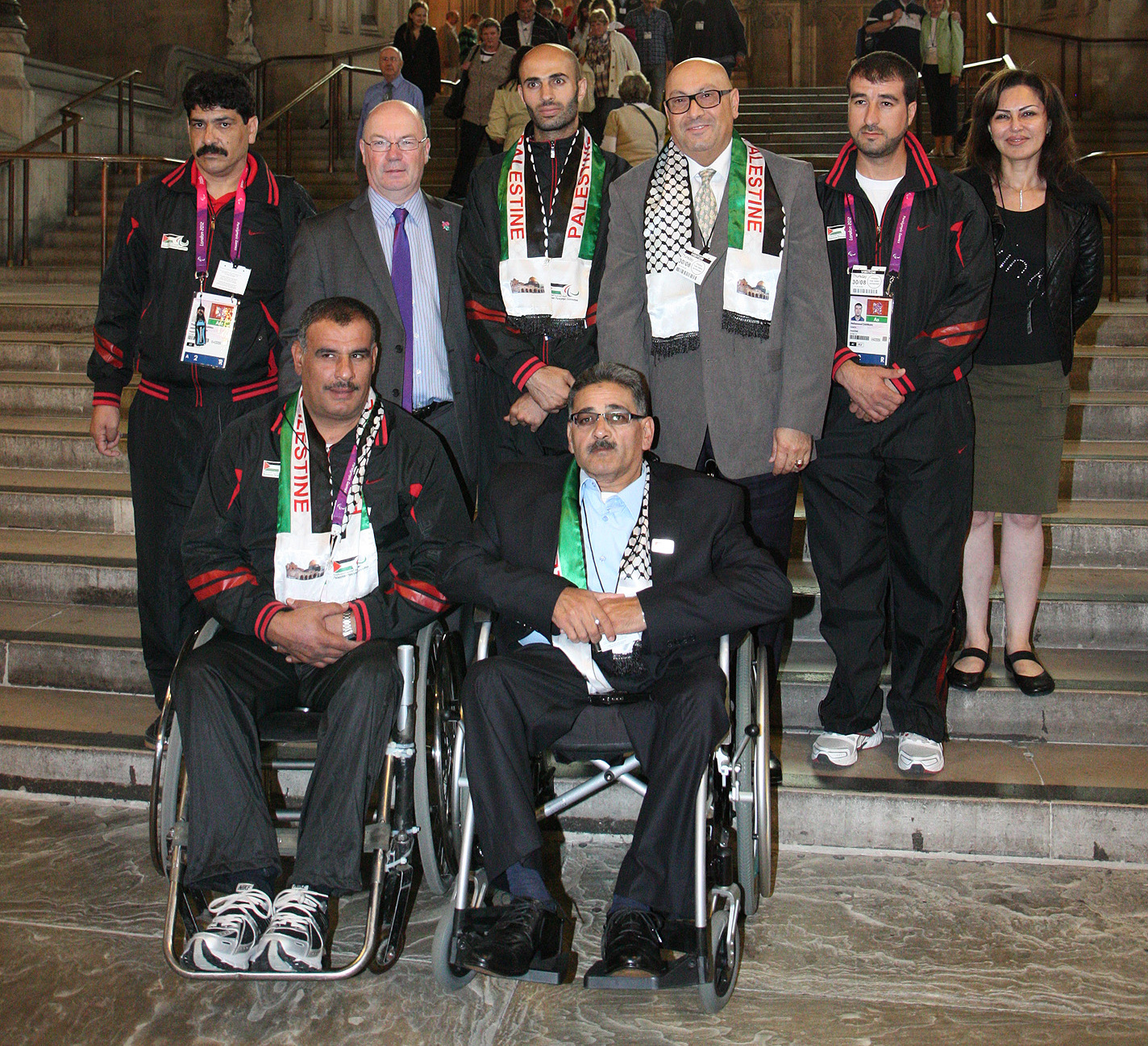
The Palestinian Paralympic delegation with Alistair Burt.

Men's Track and Road Events

Athlete	Event	Heat		Final	
Athlete	Event	Result	Rank	Result	Rank
Mohammed Fannouna	100m T13	11.88	7	did not advance	
Mohammed Fannouna	200m T13	24.00	5	did not advance	

Men's Field Events

Athlete	Event	Distance	Points	Rank
Mohammed Fannouna	Long Jump F13	5.93	—N/a	9
Mohammed Fannouna	Javelin Throw F12-13	40.59	—N/a	11
Khamis Zaqout	Shot Put F54-56	11.30	969	4
Khamis Zaqout	Discus Throw F54-56	29.41	751	12
Khamis Zaqout	Javelin Throw F54-56	22.39	—N/a	11

== See also ==
- Summer Paralympic disability classification
- Palestine at the Paralympics
- Palestine at the 2012 Summer Olympics
