= Palestine at the 2004 Summer Paralympics =

- Palestinian flag
- IPC code: PLE
- NPC: Palestinian Paralympic Committee

in Athens
- Competitors: 2 in 1 sport
- Medals Ranked 64th: Gold 0 Silver 1 Bronze 1 Total 2

Summer Paralympics appearances (overview)
- 2000; 2004; 2008; 2012; 2016; 2020; 2024

Palestine participated in the 2004 Summer Paralympics in Athens, Greece. Palestine was represented by two athletes: Husam Azzam, who had won a bronze medal in the shot put in the previous Games, and Mohammed Fannouna, competing in the long jump and javelin events.

In Athens, Azzam won silver in the shot put, while Fannouna won bronze in the long jump.

== List of medalists ==
Medal	Name	Sport	Event
Silver	Husam Azzam	Athletics	Men's shot put F53
Bronze	Mohammed Fannouna	Athletics	Men's long jump F13

== Sports ==
=== Athletics ===
==== Men's field ====
Athlete	Class	Event	Final		
Athlete	Class	Event	Result	Points	Rank
Husam Azzam	F53	Shot put	7.82	-	2nd place, silver medalist(s)
Mohammed Fannouna	F13	Javelin	39.92	-	6
Mohammed Fannouna	F13	Long jump	6.59	-	3rd place, bronze medalist(s)

== See also ==
- Palestine at the Paralympics
- Palestine at the 2004 Summer Olympics
