= Palestine at the 2008 Summer Paralympics =

- Palestinian flag
- IPC code: PLE
- NPC: Palestinian Paralympic Committee

in Beijing
- Competitors: 2 in 1 sport
- Flag bearer: Husam Azzam
- Medals: Gold 0 Silver 0 Bronze 0 Total 0

Summer Paralympics appearances (overview)
- 2000; 2004; 2008; 2012; 2016; 2020; 2024

Palestine participated in the 2008 Summer Paralympics in Beijing, but did not win any medals.

== Athletics ==
Athlete	Class	Event	Heats		Final	
Athlete	Class	Event	Result	Rank	Result	Rank
Husam Azzam	F53-54	Men's shot put	7.89	971	8	
Mohammed Fannouna	T13	Men's 100m	11.74	12	did not advance	
Mohammed Fannouna	T13	Men's 200m	23.48	12	did not advance	

== See also ==
- Palestine at the Paralympics
- Palestine at the 2008 Summer Olympics
