= Athletics at the 2011 Arab Games =

Athletics at the XII Pan Arab Games
- Dates: 15 – 20 December
- Host city: Doha, Qatar
- Venue: Khalifa Stadium
- Events: 45 (elite); 30 (disabled)
- Participation: 295 (+disabled) athletes from 21 nations

At the 2011 Pan Arab Games, the athletics events are currently being held at Khalifa Stadium in Doha, Qatar from 15 to 20 December. A total of 45 events are to be contested, comprising 23 men's events and 22 for female athletes. The track and field events took place within the stadium while the half marathon was contested on a specially designed course around the Aspire Zone. The shorter track events have a two-round format with qualifying heats and a final race, while the long-distance races and throwing events are contested in a straight final format with no qualifying rounds. In addition to the elite level programme, a total of 30 para-athletics events were contested between athletes with a disability on 21 and 22 December, comprising 25 men's events and five women's events.

Morocco topped the medal table, as it had in 2007, taking eleven gold medals and 24 medals in total. Qatar and Saudi Arabia had the next highest number of golds (six), while Egypt had the second largest medal haul, with 22 (five of them gold). Athletes from twelve nations reached the top of the podium while fifteen of the 21 competing nations won a medal in the athletics competition.

Morocco's Malika Akkaoui was the most successful athlete of the competition as she won a 400/800 metres double before winning a third gold in the relay. The women's short sprints were dominated by Dana Hussein Abdul-Razzaq and Gretta Taslakian, who were first and second in both events, and Abdul-Razzaq also won a bronze over 400 m. The men's 100 metres was a photo finish between the host nation's Femi Seun Ogunode and Barakat Al-Harthi of Oman – Al-Harthi was initially declared the winner but this was later revised in favour of Ogunode. Abubaker Ali Kamal completed a novel 5000 metres/steeplechase double for Qatar, but was later disqualified for failed a drugs test at the competition. The men's 1500 metres, won by Hassan Ayanleh, was of a high standard as all three medallists achieved the Olympic "A" qualifying mark and runner-up Hamza Driouch became the third fastest youth runner of all time.

Egypt performed well in the men's and women's throws and Yasser Ibrahim Farag won the shot put and took the discus throw silver medal. Algerian Baya Rahouli was a clear winner in the women's triple jump, taking the ninth Pan Arab Games medal of her career. Egypt's Enas Mansour took silver medals in both the women's horizontal jumps. Asian champion Mutaz Essa Barshim, one of Qatar's foremost athletes, cleared 2.30 m to win the men's high jump. Hassanine Sebei and Chaima Trabelsi of Tunisia both retained their racewalking titles from 2007.

An anonymous poll conducted by the World Anti-Doping Agency at the event showed that an estimated 45% of the athletes present at the Arab athletics competition had used a banned substance within the last 12 months.

== Medal summary ==
=== Elite men ===
Event	Gold		Silver		Bronze	
100 metres	Femi Seun Ogunode (QAT)	10.37	Barakat Al-Harthi (OMN)	10.37	Aziz Ouhadi (MAR)	10.38
200 metres	Aziz Ouhadi (MAR)	20.69	Femi Seun Ogunode (QAT)	21.01	Abdullah Al Sooli (OMA)	21.21
400 metres	Yousef Ahmed Masrahi (KSA)	45.44	Ahmed Al-Marjibi (OMN)	45.84	Rabah Yousif (SUD)	45.87
800 metres	Musaeb Abdulrahman Balla (QAT)	1:45.92	Ismail Ahmed Ismail (SUD)	1:46.60	Adnan Al-Mntafage (IRQ)	1:47.18
1500 metres	Ayanleh Souleiman (DJI)	3:34.32 NR	Hamza Driouch (QAT)	3:34.43	Mohamad Al-Garni (QAT)	3:34.61
5000 metres	Soufian Bouqantar (MAR)	13:45.81	Ali Hasan Mahboob (BHR)	13:46.32	Moukheld Al-Outaibi (KSA)	13:46.62
10,000 metres	Ali Hasan Mahboob (BHR)	28:39.88	Mumin Gala (DJI)	28:43.32	Bilisuma Shugi Gelasa (BHR)	28:44.10
110 metres hurdles	Ahmad Al-Molad (KSA)	13.60 NR	Othman Hadj Lazib (ALG)	13.74	Abdulaziz Al-Mandeel (KUW)	13.78
400 metres hurdles	Bandar Yahya Sharahili (KSA)	50.63	Miloud Rahmani (ALG)	51.03	Mohamed Sgaier (TUN)	51.27
3000 metres steeplechase	Hamid Ezzine (MAR)	8:38.37	Tareq Mubarak Taher (BHR)	8:39.25	Dejenee Mootumaa (BHR)	8:39.53
4×100 metres relay	Saudi Arabia (KSA); Yahya Hassan Habeeb; Yasir Alnashri; Mahmoud Hafiz Ibrahim; Ahmad Al-Molad	39.67	Oman (OMA); Fahad Al-Jabri; Barakat Al-Harthi; Abdullah Al-Sooli; Yahya Al-Noufali	39.84	United Arab Emirates (UAE); Hussain Al-Blooshi; Ahmed Al-Zaabi; Bilal Al-Salfa; Omar Al-Salfa	40.15
4×400 metres relay	Saudi Arabia (KSA); Hamed Al-Bishi; Mohammed Al-Salhi; Mohammed Al-Bishi; Yousef Ahmed Masrahi	3:07.22	Sudan (SUD); Rabah Yousif; Elnazeir Eltahir Abdel Kader; Hafiz Mohamed; Ismail Ahmed Ismail	3:07.47	Oman (OMA); Yahya Al Noufali; Obaid Al Quraini; Abdullah Al Hidi; Ahmed Al Marjibi	3:08.54
Half marathon	Rachid Kisri (MAR)	1:04:03	Khaled Kamel Yaseen (BHR)	1:04:31	Wissam Hosni (TUN)	1:04:37
20 km walk	Hassanine Sebei (TUN)	1:28:20 GR	Mohamed Mabrouk Saleh (QAT)	1:31:02	Ali Daghiri (MAR)	1:34:59
High jump	Mutaz Essa Barshim (QAT)	2.30 m	Ali Mohd Younes Idriss (SUD)	2.24 m	Rashid Ahmed Al-Mannai (QAT)	2.21 m
Pole vault	Mouhcine Cheaouri (MAR)	5.10 m	Sami Berhaiem (TUN)	5.05 m	Fahid Bader Al-Mershad (KUW)	4.90 m
Long jump	Saleh Abdelaziz Al-Haddad (KUW)	7.83 m	Mohamed Difallah Gawy (EGY)	7.81 m	Hussein Taher Al-Sabee (KSA)	7.59 m
Triple jump	Issam Nima (ALG)	16.59 m	Mohammad Darwish (UAE)	16.41 m	Tarik Bouguetaib (MAR)	16.33 m
Shot put	Yasser Ibrahim Farag (EGY)	19.44 m	Ahmad Gholoum (KUW)	18.74 m	Khalid Habash Al-Suwaidi (QAT)	17.79 m
Discus throw	Rashid Shafi Al-Dosari (QAT)	62.29 m	Yasser Ibrahim Farag (EGY)	60.47 m	Musab Momani (JOR)	58.95 m
Hammer throw	Ali Al-Zinkawi (KUW)	73.29 m	Mostafa Al-Gamel (EGY)	70.23 m	Hassan Mohamed Mahmoud (EGY)	68.22 m
Javelin throw	Ihab Abdelrahman El Sayed (EGY)	78.66 m	Ahmed Samir El Shabramsly (EGY)	71.23 m	Ammar Al-Najm (IRQ)	70.36 m
Decathlon	Mohammed Al-Qaree (KSA)	7677 pts NR	Hamdi Dhouibi (TUN)	7664 pts	Mourad Souissi (ALG)	7220 pts

- ^{†} = Qatar's Abubaker Ali Kamal was the initial winner of the men's 5000 m and steeplechase events, but he was later disqualified as his doping test at the event tested positive for EPO.

=== Elite women ===
Event	Gold		Silver		Bronze	
100 metres	Dana Hussein Abdul-Razzaq (IRQ)	11.88 NR	Gretta Taslakian (LIB)	11.96	Jamaa Chnaik (MAR)	12.08
200 metres	Gretta Taslakian (LIB)	24.10	Dana Hussein Abdul-Razzaq (IRQ)	24.61	Fayza Omer (SUD)	25.20
400 metres	Malika Akkaoui (MAR)	53.94	Nawal El Jack (SUD)	55.14	Dana Hussein Abdul-Razzaq (IRQ)	55.48
800 metres	Malika Akkaoui (MAR)	2:02.42	Genzeb Shumi Regasa (BHR)	2:07.19	Malika Abakil (MAR)	2:07.57
1500 metres	Genzeb Shumi Regasa (BHR)	4:20.07	Siham Hilali (MAR)	4:20.83	Betlhem Desalegn Belayneh (UAE)	4:21.50
5000 metres	Alia Saeed (UAE)	16:11.54	Betlhem Desalegn Belayneh (UAE)	16:12.71	Shitaye Eshete (BHR)	16:15.26
10,000 metres	Tejitu Daba Chalchissa (BHR)	33:09.18	Shitaye Eshete (BHR)	33:09.19	Amina Bakhit (SUD)	33:27.76 NR
100 metres hurdles	Lamiae Lhabze (MAR)	13.88	Amina Ferguen (ALG)	13.98	Roumeissa Belabiod (ALG)	14.37
400 metres hurdles	Hayat Lambarki (MAR)	56.72	Lamiae Lhabze (MAR)	57.55	Tasabih Mohamed El Sayed (SUD)	1:00.00
4×100 metres relay	Morocco (MAR); Jamaa Chnaik; Hayat Lambarki; Ghita El Kafy; Salima Jamali	46.16	Egypt (EGY); Radwa Fadl; Salma Elsayed; Wedian Hussain; Enas Mansour	48.87	Qatar (QAT); Nada Nabil Abdalla; Fatemeh Mazaher Sassanipoor; Reyma Alen Thomas; Noor Hussain Al Malki	52.10
4×400 metres relay	Morocco (MAR); Lamiae Lhabze; Malika Akkaoui; Malika Abakil; Hayat Lambarki	3:38.64	Sudan (SUD); Nawal El Jack; Alawia Andal; Fayza Omer; Tasabih Mohamed	3:45.91	Algeria (ALG); Fassila Fnides; Djamila Bensalem; Asma Amar-Belhadj; Houria Moussa	3:50.36
Half marathon	Lishan Dula (BHR)	1:14:18	Kareema Saleh Jasim (BHR)	1:14:31	Samira Raif (MAR)	1:14:35
10 km walk	Chaima Trabelsi (TUN)	48:17.91	Olfa Lafi (TUN)	50:07.49	Nazha Ezzhani (MAR)	54:08.32
High jump	Rhizlane Siba (MAR)	1.76 m	Basant Ibrahim (EGY)	1.76 m	Maryam Mohamed Al-Ansari (BHR)	1.70 m NR
Pole vault	Nisrine Dinar (MAR)	3.91 m	Dorra Mahfoudi (TUN)	3.65 m	Dina Eltabaa (EGY)	3.30 m
Long jump	Roumeissa Belabiod (ALG)	6.07 m	Enas Mansour (EGY)	6.03 m	Jamaa Chnaik (MAR)	5.86 m
Triple jump	Baya Rahouli (ALG)	14.01 m	Enas Mansour (EGY)	12.80 m	Jamaa Chnaik (MAR)	12.76 m
Shot put	Walaa Eldakak (EGY)	14.92 m	Fadya Saad El Kasaby (EGY)	14.67 m	Sihem Marrakchi (TUN)	14.27 m
Discus throw	Elham Wahba (EGY)	46.88 m	Sara Dardiri (EGY)	46.75 m	Basma Mohamed Abdoh (BHR)	31.05 m
Hammer throw	Sarah Bensaad (TUN)	60.49 m	Nehal Hamed (EGY)	58.64 m	Rana Ibrahim (EGY)	58.47 m
Javelin throw	Ahmed Reda (EGY)	45.93 m	Sihem Marrakchi (TUN)	43.75 m	Hanaa Hassan (EGY)	43.72 m
Heptathlon	Nada Chroudi (TUN)	4993 pts	Wedian Hussain (EGY)	4800 pts	Radwa Fadl (EGY)	4618 pts

=== Men's para-athletics ===
Event	Gold		Silver		Bronze	
100m T12	Ayoub Chaoui (MAR)	11.56	Ahmed Kadhim (IRQ)	11.58	Mahmoud Khaldi (TUN)	11.69
100m T13	Youssef Fahmy (MAR)	11.25	Hussein Kadhim (IRQ)	11.29	Mohammed Fannouna (PLE)	11.63
100m T37	Sofiane Hamdi (ALG)	11.90	Mostafa Mohamed (EGY)	11.93	Mohamed Charmi (TUN)	13.00
100m T46	Fadhil Al-Dabbagh (IRQ)	11.19	Saeed Alkhaldi (KSA)	11.47	Mohammed Dif (MAR)	11.73
100m T53	Mohammed Bani Hashem (UAE)	16.17	Fahad Alganaidl (KSA)	16.32	Ayed Alhababi (UAE)	16.84
100m T54	Fethi Zouinhki (TUN)	14.95	Ahmed Aouadi (TUN)	14.95	Jasim Alnaqbi (UAE)	15.45
200 T12	Ayoub Chaoui (MAR)	23.25	Mohammed El Qoussi (MAR)	24.23	Abdulmagid Said (LBA)	25.64
200 T13	Youssef Fahmy (MAR)	22.69	Hussein Kadhim (IRQ)	22.72	Mohammed Fannouna (PLE)	23.97
200m T46	Fadhil Al-Dabbagh (IRQ)	23.11	Mohammed Dif (MAR)	23.78	Bilal Hussein (JOR)	24.15
200m T53	Ayed Alhababi (UAE)	29.32	Fahad Alganaidl (KSA)	29.63	Vacant	
800m T46	Mohamed Fouzai (TUN)	1:59.52	Ahmed Farhat (MAR)	1:59.96	Abdelhadi El Harti (MAR)	2:00.60
1500m T37	Madjid Djemai (ALG)	4:28.33	Mohamed Charmi (TUN)	4:28.75	Hafid Aharak (MAR)	4:29.85
1500m T54	Ahmed Aouadi (TUN)	3:35.02	Fethi Zouinhki (TUN)	3:35.08	Rashed Aldhaheri (UAE)	3:39.74
Long jump F20	Asaad Sharaheli (KSA)	6.75 m	Abdelmalek Souaissa (TUN)	5.84 m	Ala Elfurawi (LBA)	5.81 m
Shot put F20	Mohamed Fatnassi (TUN)	13.09 m	Rabia Omran (LBA)	11.36 m	Abdelmalek Souaissa (TUN)	10.92 m
Shot put F34	Mohamed Ali Krid (TUN)	10.50 m	Faouzi Rzig (TUN)	10.04 m	Azzedinne Nouiri (MAR)	10.00 m
Shot put F42	Salim Al-Juboori (IRQ)	11.87 m	Walid Ahmed (LBA)	11.24 m	Brahim Bouzertini (ALG)	10.70 m
Shot put F54/55/56	Khamis Zaqout (PLE)	935 (10.77 m)	Ibrahim Ibrahim (EGY)	680 (9.59 m)	Husam Alkhatib (JOR)	655 (9.40 m)
Shot put F57/58	Jamil Elshebli (JOR)	987 (14.06 m)	Redhouane Ait Said (ALG)	890 (14.46 m)	Amer Alabbadi (JOR)	825 (13.61 m)
Discus throw F34	Mohamed Ali Krid (TUN)	42.26 m	Faouzi Rzig (TUN)	34.52 m	Mohammad Almehairi (UAE)	31.00 m
Discus throw F42	Waild Ahmed (LBA)	38.85 m	Kheireddine Ougour (ALG)	34.01 m	SalimAl-Juboori (IRQ)	32.46 m
Discus throw F51/52/53	Mohamed Hassan (EGY)	770 (23.49 m)	Husam Azzam (PLE)	433 (18.60 m)	Mohammed Al Joaidi (QAT)	343 (7.34 m)
Discus throw F57/58	Metawa Abo Elkhir (EGY)	926 (53.20 m)	Mahmoud Rajab (LBA)	792 (46.74 m)	Abdelrahman Abuwatfa (PLE)	760 (38.32 m)
Javelin throw F54/55/56	Ibrahim Ibrahim (EGY)	885 (33.24 m)	Yaser Elsayed (EGY)	870 (27.23 m)	Khamis Zaqout (PLE)	830 (25.74 m)
Javelin throw F57/58	Raed Salem (EGY)	908 (46.05 m)	Mahmoud El Attar (EGY)	805 (41.77 m)	Nasser Al-Sahoti (QAT)	772 (40.52 m)

=== Women's para-athletics ===
Event	Gold		Silver		Bronze	
Shot put F32/33/34	Yousra Ben Jemaa (TUN)	935 (7.32 m)	Souheila Hariki (ALG)	915 (7.17 m)	Thuraya Alzaabi (UAE)	749 (6.10 m)
Shot put F54/55/56	Fadhila Nafati (TUN)	901 (6.28 m)	Hania Aidi (TUN)	829 (5.89 m)	Sanae Soubane (MAR)	496 (4.54 m)
Shot put F57/58	Saifa Djalel (ALG)	966 (10.63 m)	Nadia Medjmedj (ALG)	927 (9.78 m)	Nassima Saifi (ALG)	885 (9.61 m)
Discus throw F57/58	Nassima Saifi (ALG)	1022 (39.84 m)	Nadia Medjmedj (ALG)	908 (27.70 m)	Silham Alrasheedy (UAE)	823 (25.43 m)
Javelin throw F54/55/56	Hania Aidi (TUN)	968 (16.41 m)	Fadhila Nafati (TUN)	761 (12.82 m)	Sanae Soubane (MAR)	443 (9.21 m)

== Medal table ==
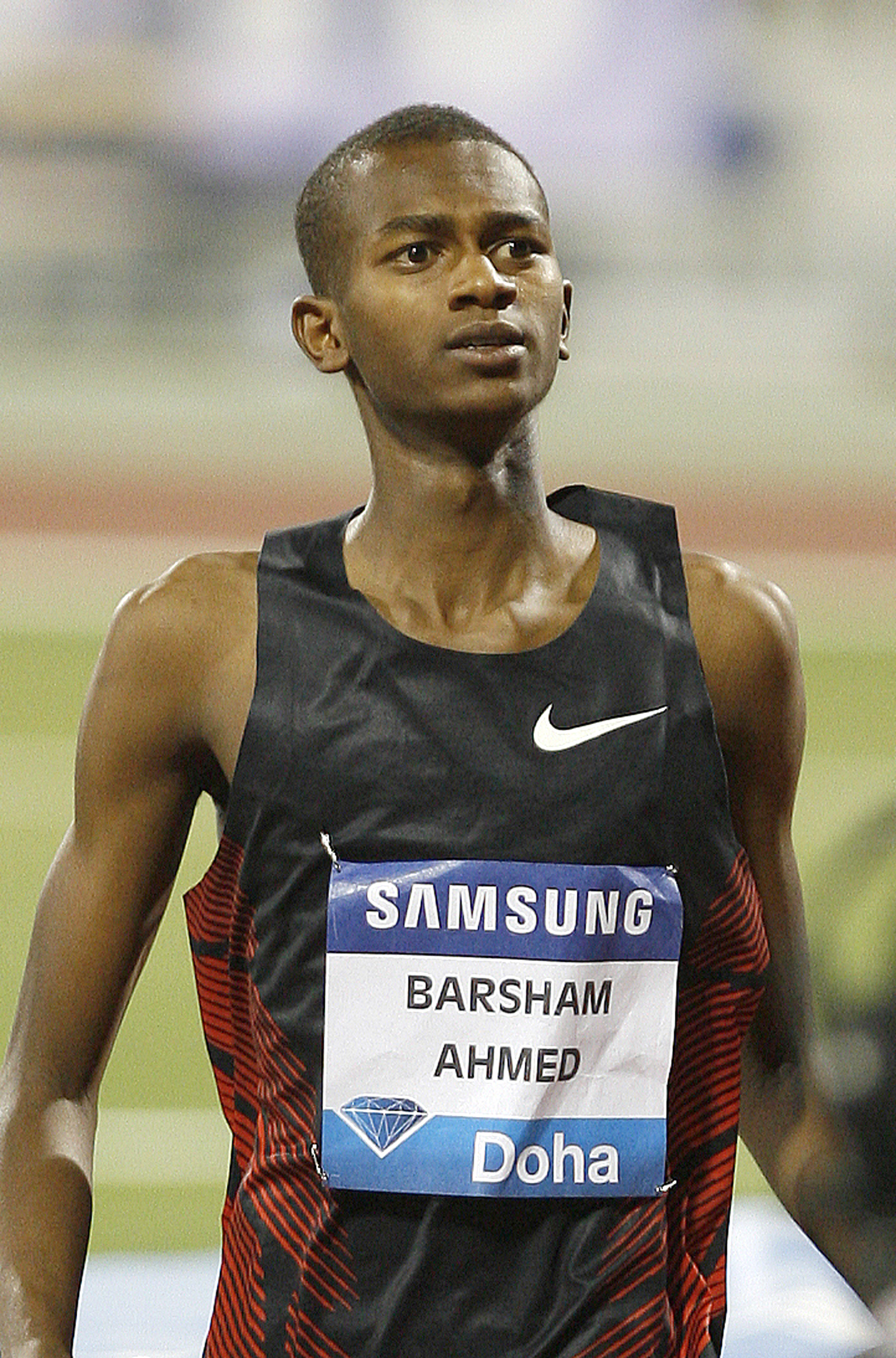
Qatari Mutaz Essa Barshim won the men's high jump for the hosts.

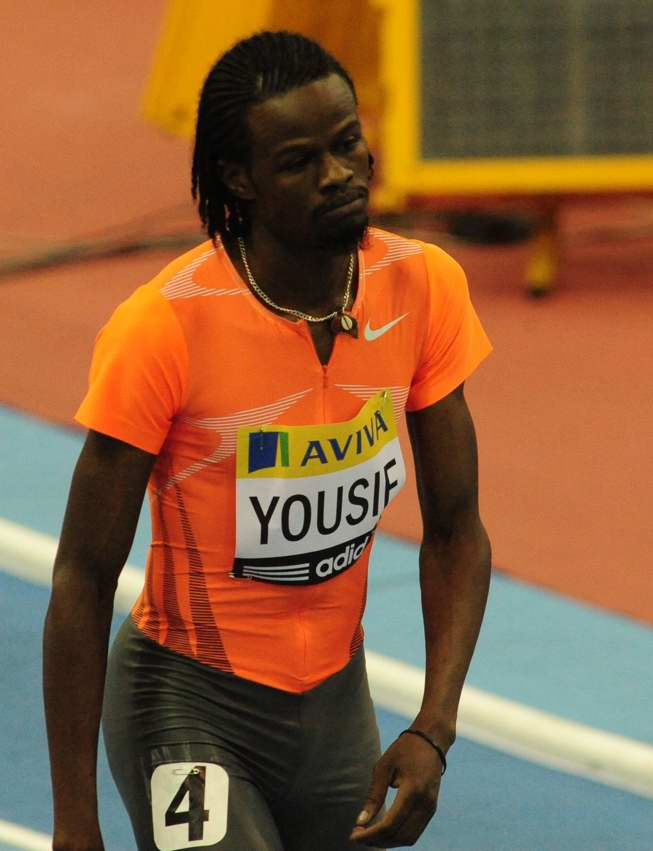
Rabah Yousif of Sudan won individual and relay medals over 400 m.

- Note: The results of the para-athletics competitions did not count towards neither the athletics, nor the overall medal count.

* Host nation (Qatar)

Rank	Nation	Gold	Silver	Bronze	Total
1	Morocco	13	2	9	24
2	Saudi Arabia	6	0	2	8
3	Egypt	5	12	5	22
4	Bahrain	4	6	5	15
5	Tunisia	4	5	3	12
6	Qatar*	4	3	4	11
7	Algeria	3	3	3	9
8	Kuwait	2	1	2	5
9	United Arab Emirates	1	2	2	5
10	Iraq	1	1	3	5
11	Djibouti	1	1	0	2
11	Lebanon	1	1	0	2
13	Sudan	0	5	4	9
14	Oman	0	3	2	5
15	Jordan	0	0	1	1
Totals (15 entries)		45	45	45	135

=== Para-athletics ===
* Host nation (Qatar)

Rank	Nation	Gold	Silver	Bronze	Total
1	Tunisia	9	8	3	20
2	Algeria	4	5	2	11
3	Egypt	4	4	0	8
4	Morocco	4	3	6	13
5	Iraq	3	3	1	7
6	United Arab Emirates	2	0	6	8
7	Libya	1	3	2	6
8	Saudi Arabia	1	3	0	4
9	Palestine	1	1	4	6
10	Jordan	1	0	3	4
11	Qatar*	0	0	2	2
Totals (11 entries)		30	30	29	89

== Participating nations ==
- Algeria (23)
- Bahrain (18)
- Comoros (6)
- Djibouti (5)
- Egypt (25)
- Iraq (14)
- Jordan (1)
- Kuwait (18)
- Lebanon (5)
- Libya (13)
- Mauritania (4)
- Morocco (37)
- Oman (14)
- Palestine (4)
- Qatar (24)
- Saudi Arabia (28)
- Somalia (5)
- Sudan (25)
- Tunisia (15)
- United Arab Emirates (9)
- Yemen (2)

== Changes in medal standings ==
Event	Nation	Gold	Silver	Bronze	Total
5000 metres	Qatar	–1			–1
5000 metres	Morocco	+1	–1		0
5000 metres	Bahrain		+1	–1	0
5000 metres	Saudi Arabia			+1	+1
3000 metres steeplechase	Qatar	–1			–1
3000 metres steeplechase	Morocco	+1	–1		0
3000 metres steeplechase	Bahrain		+1	0	+1
