= Palestine at the 2016 Summer Paralympics =

- Palestinian flag
- IPC code: PLE
- NPC: Palestinian Paralympic Committee

in Rio de Janeiro
- Competitors: 1 in 1 sports
- Flag bearer: Husam Azzam
- Medals: Gold 0 Silver 0 Bronze 0 Total 0

Summer Paralympics appearances (overview)
- 2000; 2004; 2008; 2012; 2016; 2020; 2024

Palestine sent a delegation to compete at the 2016 Summer Paralympics in Rio de Janeiro, Brazil, from 7–18 September 2016. This was the fifth time they had taken part in a Paralympic Games after its debut sixteen years prior at the 2000 Summer Paralympics. Palestine sent one athlete to Rio de Janeiro shot put thrower Husam Azzam, who was the flag bearer for Palestine at the parade of nations during the opening ceremony. He did not win his third Paralympic medal because he ranked eighth out of ten athletes with a throw of 6.34 metres in the men's shot put F53 competition.

== Background ==
Palestine's first Olympic appearance was at the 1996 Atlanta Summer Olympics. It made its Paralympic debut four years later at the 2000 Summer Paralympics in Sydney, Australia. They have entered every Summer Paralympic Games since, making Rio de Janeiro its fifth appearance at a Summer Paralympiad. Entering the Rio Games, Palestine had won a total of three Paralympic medals in the sport of athletics. The 2016 Summer Paralympics were held from 7–18 September 2016 with a total of 4,328 athletes representing 159 National Paralympic Committees taking part. Palestine sent a solitary athlete to compete in Rio de Janeiro, shot put thrower Husam Azzam. He was accompanied by chef de mission Ihsan Dikidk, Azzam's coach Mohammed Dahman, chairman of the technical committee of the Palestinian Paralympic Committee Ali Al-Nizli and former secretary general of the committee Alaa Al-Shatli. Azzam was chosen to be the flag bearer for the parade of nations during the opening ceremony.

== Disability classifications ==
Every participant at the Paralympics has their disability grouped into one of five disability categories; amputation, the condition may be congenital or sustained through injury or illness; cerebral palsy; wheelchair athletes, there is often overlap between this and other categories; visual impairment, including blindness; Les autres, any physical disability that does not fall strictly under one of the other categories, for example dwarfism or multiple sclerosis. Each Paralympic sport then has its own classifications, dependent upon the specific physical demands of competition. Events are given a code, made of numbers and letters, describing the type of event and classification of the athletes competing. Some sports, such as athletics, divide athletes by both the category and severity of their disabilities, other sports, for example swimming, group competitors from different categories together, the only separation being based on the severity of the disability.

== Athletics ==
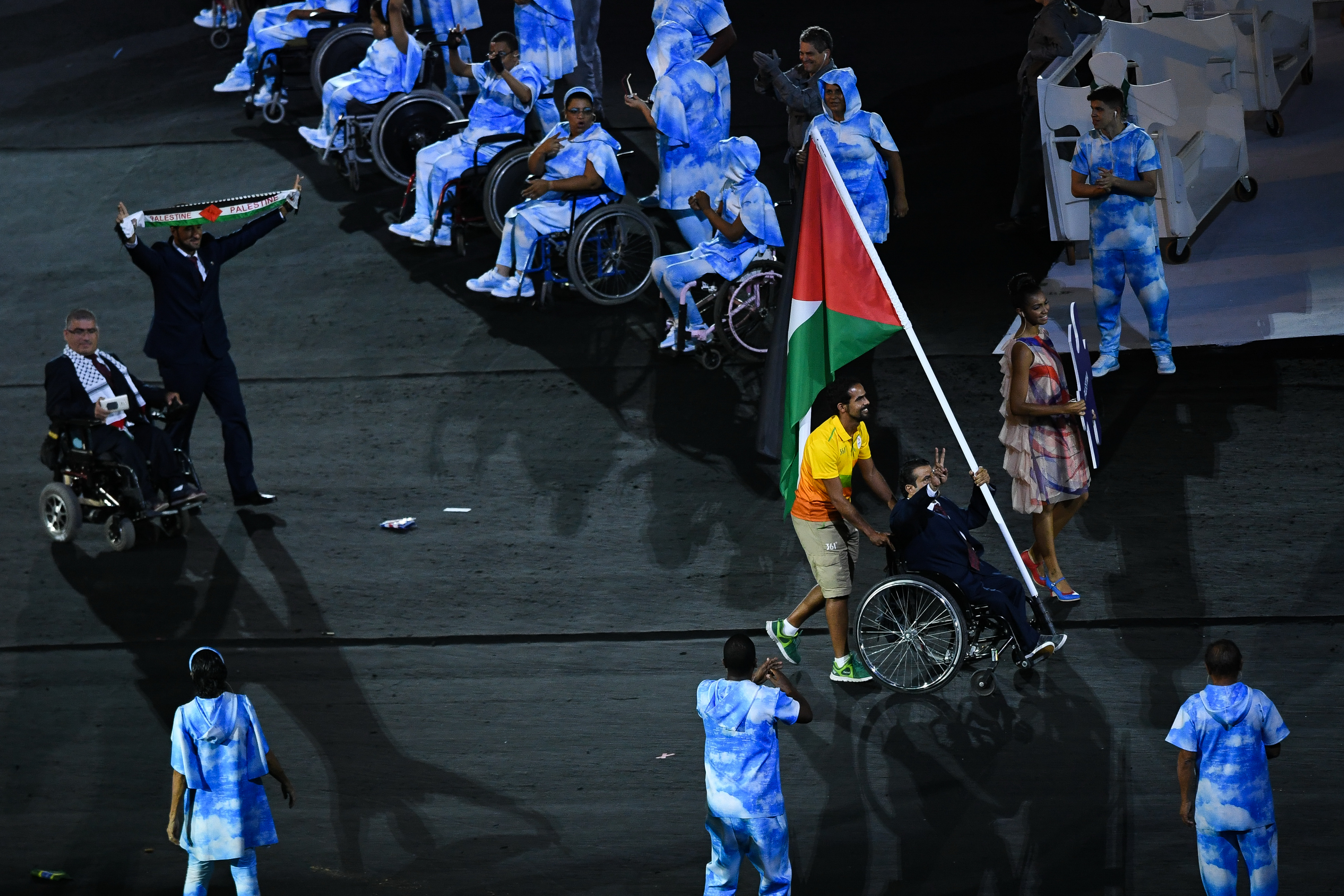
Husam Azzam carrying the flag of Palestine in the parade of nations during the opening ceremony.

Husam Azzam's is disabled from contracting polio as an infant and losing the use of both his legs. He has had to use a wheelchair since and is classified as F53. Azzam was 40 years old at the time of the Rio Paralympics, and it was his fifth time competing at the Summer Paralympic Games; he won a medal at each of the 2000 and the 2004 Summer Paralympics. He qualified for the Games by using a wild card because he had not competed in any internationally sanctioned qualifying tournament in the three years leading up to the Games. The Palestinian Paralympic Committee negotiated and explained to the sports' governing body, the International Paralympic Committee (IPC), about Azzam's restrictions of movement due to the constant closures of the Rafah Border Crossing and the Erez Crossing by Israeli authorities, which prevented him from attending three international training camps. This restricted him to staying in the Gaza Strip preparing for the Games with corroded shot put metal balls and on a sandy playground that did not meet international standards.

Nevertheless, following the intervention of the IPC, Azzam and his coach Mohammed Daham were permitted to leave the Gaza StrIp on 3 September and the pair arrived in Rio de Janeiro two days later. He said before the Paralympics that he was looking forward to competing at the Rio Games and he sought to claim a gold medal, "I look forward to the competition and challenge all the conditions and difficulties I will face and hope to win a gold medal for Palestine at the Paralympic Games, despite the difficulties I face as a Palestinian athlete living in the Gaza Strip." On 14 September, Azzam competed in the men's shot put F53 event. He recorded a season best throw of 6.34 metres, which ranked him eighth out of ten entered athletes.

Men's Field

Athlete	Events	Result	Rank
Husam Azzam	Shot Put F53	6.34	8

== See also ==
- Palestine at the 2016 Summer Olympics
