= Athletics at the 2012 Summer Paralympics – Men's 800 metres T12 =

Men's 800 metres T12 at the XIV Paralympic Games
- Venue: London Olympic Stadium
- Dates: 3 to 5 September
- Competitors: 13 from 10 nations
- Winning time: 1:56.42

Medalists
1st place, gold medalist(s)		Abderrahim Zhiou	Tunisia
2nd place, silver medalist(s)		Egor Sharov	Russia
3rd place, bronze medalist(s)		David Devine	Great Britain

Athletics at the 2012 Summer Paralympics
Classification
T/F11–13: Blind and visually impaired
T/F20: Intellectual disability
T/F31–38: Cerebral palsy
F40: Les Autres
T/F42–46: Amputees
T/F51–58: Spinal cord disability
Men T/F11–13
Track
100 m	T11	T12	T13
200 m	T11	T12	T13
400 m	T11	T12	T13
800 m		T12	T13
1500 m	T11		T13
5000 m	T11	T12
4×100 m relay	T11–13
Road
Marathon		T12
Field
Long jump	F11		F13
Triple jump	F11	F12
Shot put	F11–12
Discus throw	F11
Javelin throw		F12–13
Women T/F11–13
Track
100 m	T11	T12	T13
200 m	T11	T12
400 m		T12	T13
1500 m		T12
Field
Long jump	F11–12		F13
Shot put	F11–12
Discus throw	F11–12
Javelin throw		F12–13

The Men's 800 metres T12 event at the 2012 Summer Paralympics took place at the London Olympic Stadium from 3 to 5 September.

The T12 category is for athletes with visual impairment. Athletes in this category will generally have some residual sight, the ability to recognise the shape of a hand at a distance of 2 metres and the ability to perceive clearly will be no more than 2/60. T12 athletes commonly run with guides.

== Records ==
Prior to the competition, the existing World and Paralympic records were as follows:

World & Paralympic record	Abderrahim Zhiou (TUN)	1:52.13	10 September 2008	Beijing, China

== Results ==
=== Round 1 ===
Competed 3 September 2012 from 12:16. Qual. rule: winner of each heat (Q) plus best second place (q) qualified.

==== Heat 1 ====
Rank	Athlete	Country	Time	Notes
1	David Devine	Great Britain	1:55.97	Q, SB
2	Mehmet Nesim Öner	Turkey	1:57.40	PB
3	Ignacio Avila	Spain	1:58.00	
4	Carlos J Barto Silva; Guide: Cassio Henrique Damiao	Brazil	2:06.69	

==== Heat 2 ====
Rank	Athlete	Country	Time	Notes
1	Egor Sharov	Russia	1:59.18	Q
2	Hatem Nasrallah	Tunisia	2:03.83	
3	Lassam Katongo	Zambia	2:04.22	SB
4	El Amin Chentouf	Morocco	2:13.81	
5	Luis Hernández; Guide: Maxim Espinal	Honduras	2:33.20	

==== Heat 3 ====
Rank	Athlete	Country	Time	Notes
1	Abderrahim Zhiou	Tunisia	1:55.99	Q, SB
2	Lazaro Rashid Aguilar	Cuba	1:56.64	q, PB
3	Semih Deniz	Turkey	1:57.03	
4	Thierb Siqueira; Guide: Heitor de Oliveira Sales	Brazil	DNS	

=== Final ===
Competed 5 September 2012 at 19:35.

Rank	Athlete	Country	Time	Notes
1st place, gold medalist(s)	Abderrahim Zhiou	Tunisia	1:56.42	
2nd place, silver medalist(s)	Egor Sharov	Russia	1:56.65	
3rd place, bronze medalist(s)	David Devine	Great Britain	1:58.72	
4	Lazaro Rashid Aguilar	Cuba	1:58.76	

Q = qualified by place. q = qualified by time. PB = Personal Best. SB = Seasonal Best. DNS = Did not start.
