= Alexander Zverev (disambiguation) =

Alexander Zverev (born 1997) is a German tennis player.

Alexander Zverev may also refer to:

- Alexander Zverev (sprinter) (born 1989), Russian sprinter
- Alexander Zverev Sr. (born 1960), Russian former tennis player
