= Disability in Palestine =

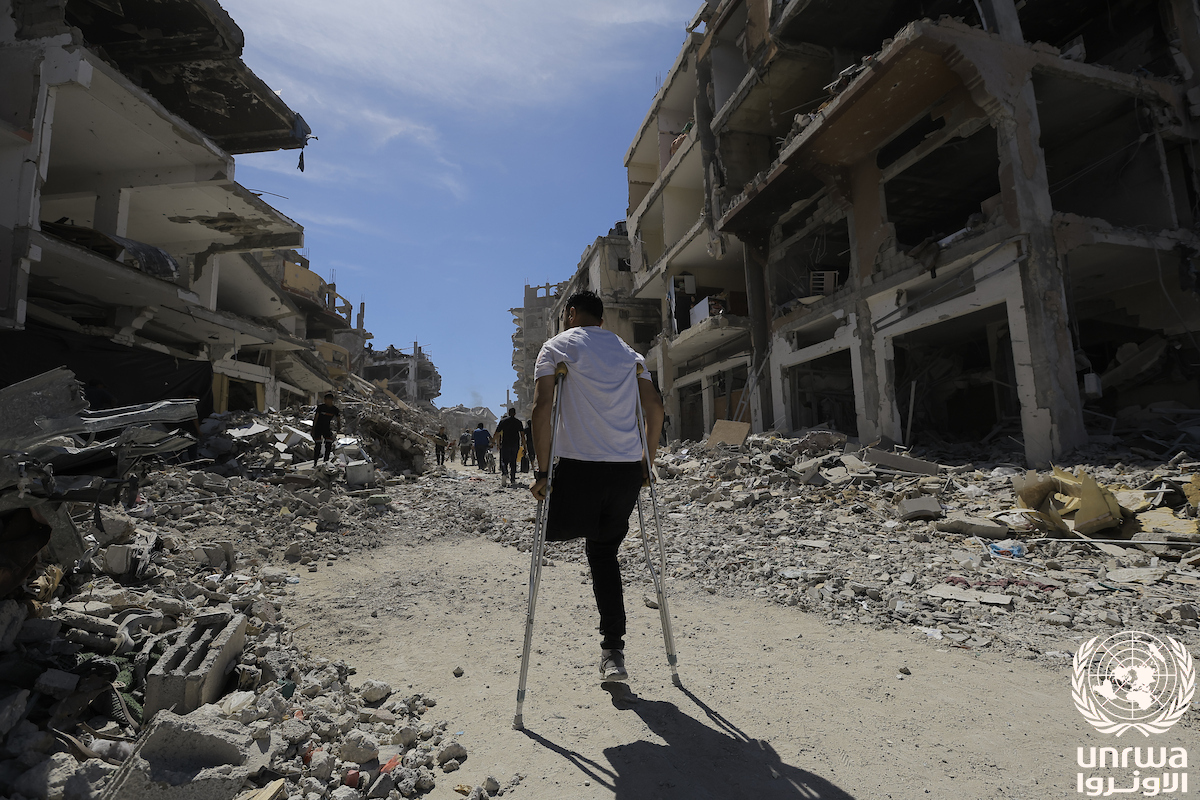
A displaced person with a disability walks over the rubble of houses in Jabalia camp, Gaza Strip in May 2024

In Palestine, disability affects 2.1% of the population, according to the 2017 census. About half of all disabled Palestinians have mobility impairments. Education of children with disabilities is problematic, with low school attendance.

== Demographics ==
As of 2017, disability affects 2.1% of the population of Palestine, a total of 92,710 people, according to the Population, Housing, and Establishments Census. The majority (47,109 people) are affected by mobility impairments, while a fifth are under 18 years old. Geographic distribution is almost evenly split between the West Bank (48%) and the Gaza Strip (52%). 75% live in urban areas, 13% in rural areas, and 12% live in the camps.

== Education ==
In 2017 the illiteracy rate of disabled persons aged 10 years and over was 32%. Disabled males illiteracy rate was 20% compared to 46% for females. In the West Bank the illiteracy rate was 35%, and 29% in the Gaza Strip.

According to the Palestinian Ministry of Education and Higher Education there were 4,823 disabled children in grades one to ten in government schools in the West Bank, and 2,006 in the Gaza Strip, during the 2015–2016 school year.

According to the 2018 State of Palestine Country Report on Out-Of-School Children by UNICEF, children with disabilities are most at risk of exclusion from education.

=== 6- to 9-year-old children ===
In the 6-9-year-old group about 32.5% children with a disability had never attended school versus only 0.9% of their non-disabled peers. In the Gaza Strip the incidence was 42.5%, while it was 27.7% in the West Bank.

=== 10- to 15-year-old children ===
About 30.2% of 10-15-year-old children with disabilities were excluded from school compared to only 2.3% of their non-disabled peers. About 22.1% of disabled children in this age group had never attended school. Disabled girls in this age group were excluded at higher rates (36.6%) than boys (26.3%). The gender difference is mostly due to 28.5% of girls with disabilities never attending school, versus only 18.3% of boys with disabilities. In the Gaza Strip 33.2% of this group had not attended school while the incidence in the West Bank was 28.3%.

=== Severity of disability ===
Children with multiple disabilities are excluded at even higher rates (54.8%) compared to those with a single disability (9.4%). For multi-disabled 6-9-year-old children the non-attendance rate was estimated at 49.2%, and 44.3% for 10-15-year-old age group. The type of disability also affects the rate of exclusion. An estimated 8.6% of those who have physical disabilities were out of school, versus 22.6% with psychological or intellectual disabilities.

== Sport ==
A Palestinian team has competed at the Summer Paralympic Games since the 2000 Summer Paralympics in Sydney, Australia.

== Gaza war ==
People with disabilities are especially vulnerable during war. During the Gaza war, 83% of people with disabilities lost equipment designed to assist them. Since the start of the war the number of people in Gaza with disabilities has doubled.

=== Impact on children ===
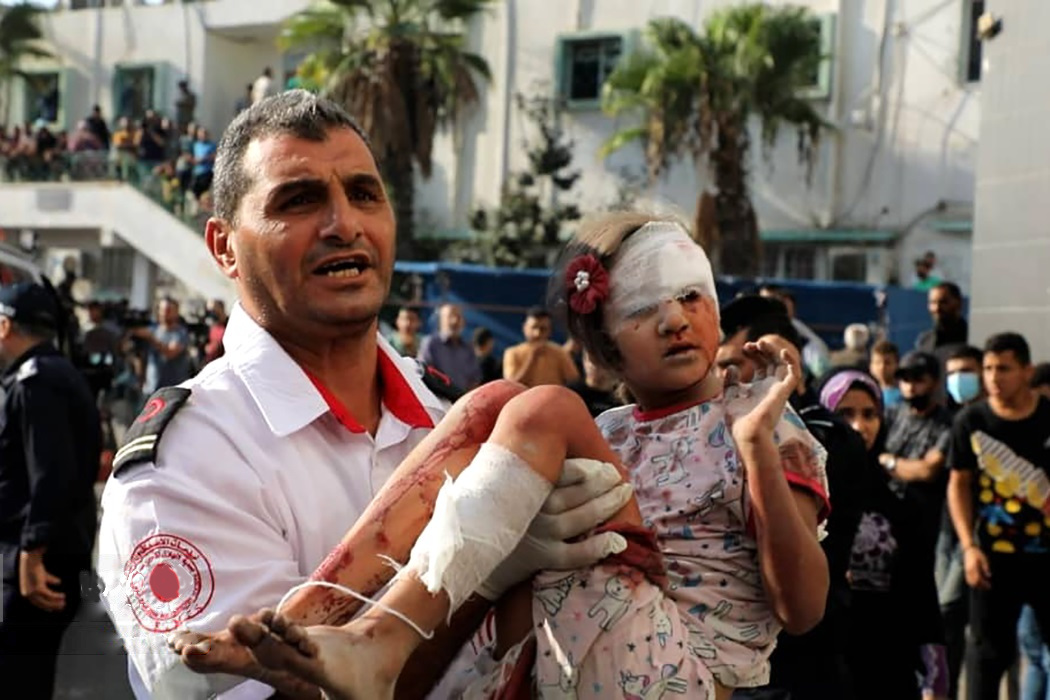
Medic carried wounded child

Doctors described children experiencing serious injuries. Doctors warned children who survived Israeli airstrikes were left with permanent disabilities and trauma. A report by Save the Children in January 2024 stated children were "enduring unspeakable horrors, including life-changing injuries, burns, disease, inadequate medical care, and losing their parents and other loved ones". A Doctors Without Borders doctor stated children were suffering from "terrible injuries, huge burns covering 50-70% of their body and massively broken limbs". Many of the surgeries performed on the children and other patients were performed without anesthesia due to severe shortages of medical supplies in Gaza, according to WHO. A doctor with Doctors Without Borders reflected that even after working in many war zones, he has seen more injured children in Gaza, stating; "It was really shocking for me because I have never seen babies. So many babies victim of trauma, of war, with war wounds".

A British doctor who spent time in Gaza through a medical charity and returned to the United Kingdom in December 2023 highlighted the concerns of poor hygiene and medical supply shortages that could cause wounds to become worse and make some un-survivable. This was echoed by UNICEF spokesperson James Elder, who recounted seeing a child who had been stuck in a vehicle at an Israeli military checkpoint for days due to delays, with a wound that had started to decompose. In June 2024, children with cancer and other illnesses were prevented from receiving chemotherapy outside of the Gaza Strip when Israel closed the Rafah border crossing during its Rafah offensive. In July 2024, American and Australian doctors stated that Israel was using bombs that spray shrapnel, which were causing "horrific injuries" to children. A one-week old baby was evacuated from Gaza after an Israeli bomb sent shrapnel into his eye. The same month, Israeli PM Netanyahu blocked the creation of a children's field hospital in Gaza.

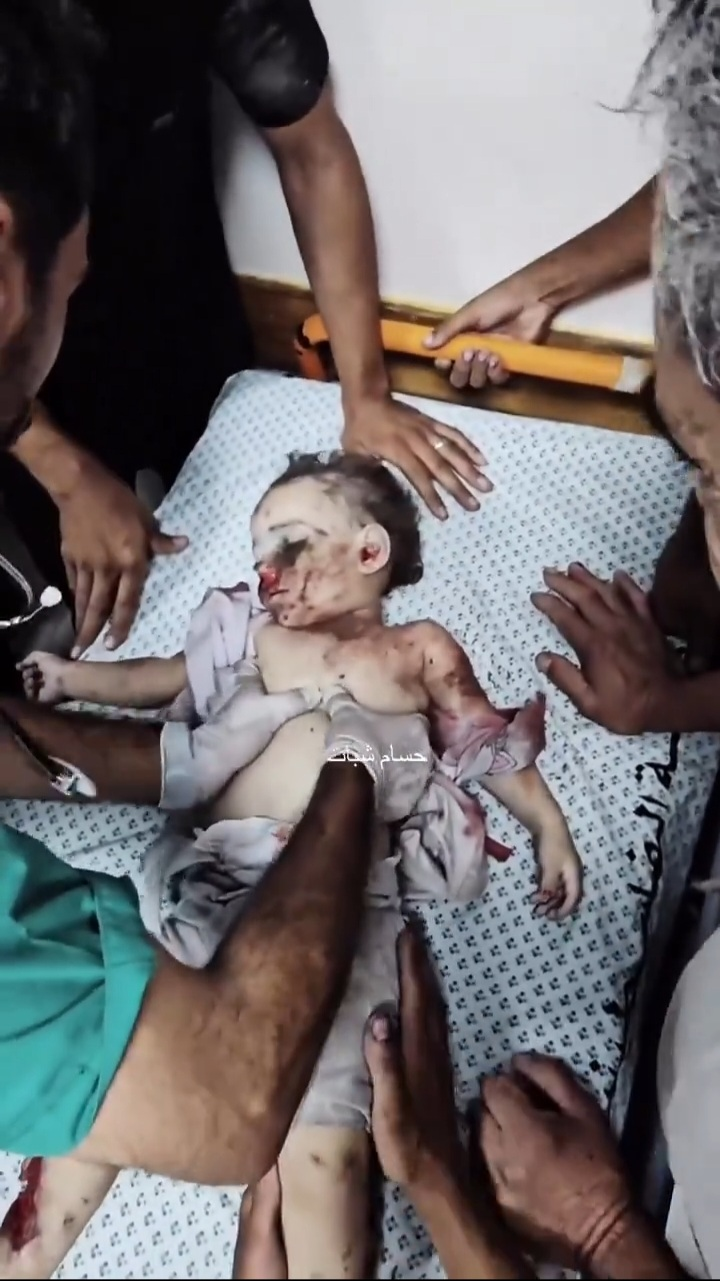
Rescue attempt for one-year-old girl in Gaza, 18 August 2024

In June 2024, Adam Hamawy, a former US army combat surgeon who worked in the European Hospital, stated, "But the level of civilian casualties that I experienced was beyond anything I'd seen before... Most of our patients were children under the age of 14". In August 2024, an Israeli airstrike killed Joumana Arafa and her four-day-old twins.
