= Palestine at the 2024 Summer Paralympics =

2024 sporting event delegation in Paris

- Flag of Palestine
- IPC code: PLE
- NPC: Palestinian Paralympic Committee

in Paris, France August 28, 2024 – September 8, 2024
- Competitors: 1 (1 man) in 1 sport
- Flag bearer: Fadi Aldeeb
- Medals: Gold 0 Silver 0 Bronze 0 Total 0

Summer Paralympics appearances (overview)
- 2000; 2004; 2008; 2012; 2016; 2020; 2024

Palestine competed at the 2024 Summer Paralympics in Paris, France, from 28 August to 8 September 2024.

In the lead-up to the event, concerns were raised about the ability of Palestinian athletes to participate due to the destruction of sporting facilities and the exposure to potential harm amid the Gaza war. The paracyclist Hazem Suleiman, who had his leg amputated after being shot during the 2018–2019 Gaza border protests, did not compete in the event because the outbreak of the war halted his training. Palestine's only Paralympian for the 2024 event was Gazan shot putter Fadi Aldeeb, who was paralyzed after being shot by an Israeli sniper during the Second Intifada of 2001 and lost 17 members of his family, including his brother, in Israeli attacks during the 2024 war.

== Competitors ==
The following is the list of number of competitors in the Games, including game-eligible alternates in team sports.

Sport	Men	Women	Total
Athletics	1	0	1
Total	1	0	1

== Athletics ==
Key

- Note–Ranks given for track events are within the athlete's heat only
- Q = Qualified for the next round
- q = Qualified for the next round as a fastest loser or, in field events, by position without achieving the qualifying target
- DQ = Disqualified
- PR = Paralympic Record
- AR = Area (or continental) Record
- NR = National Record
- SB = Season's Best
- N/A = Round not applicable for the event
- Bye = Athlete not required to compete in round

Field events

Athlete	Event	Final	
Athlete	Event	Result	Rank
Fadi Aldeeb	Men's shot put F55	8.81; SB	10

== See also ==
- Palestine at the 2024 Summer Olympics
- Palestine at the Paralympics
