= Palestine at the 2000 Summer Paralympics =

- Palestinian flag
- IPC code: PLE
- NPC: Palestinian Paralympic Committee

in Sydney
- Competitors: 2
- Medals: Gold 0 Silver 0 Bronze 1 Total 1

Summer Paralympics appearances (overview)
- 2000; 2004; 2008; 2012; 2016; 2020; 2024

One male and one female athlete from Palestine participated in the 2000 Summer Paralympics in Sydney, Australia. It was the first Palestinian Territories participation in the Paralympic Games. Husam Azzam won Palestine's only medal: a bronze in the shot put.

== List of medalists ==
Medal	Name	Sport	Event
Bronze	Husam Azzam	Athletics	Shot put

== See also ==
- 2000 Summer Paralympics
- Palestine at the Paralympics
- Palestine at the 2000 Summer Olympics
