= Athletics at the 2008 Summer Paralympics – Men's 100 metres T13 =

The Men's 100m T13 had its competition held on September 13, with the first round at 9:10 and the Final at 17:45.

== Medalists ==
| Gold | Jason Smyth; Ireland |
| Silver | Alexey Labzin; Russia |
| Bronze | Luis Felipe Gutierrez; Cuba |

== Results ==
| Place | Athlete | Round 1 | Final |
|---|---|---|---|
| 1 | Jason Smyth (IRL) | 10.81 Q WR | 10.62 WR |
| 2 | Alexey Labzin (RUS) | 10.98 Q =PR | 10.88 |
| 3 | Luis Felipe Gutierrez (CUB) | 11.12 Q | 10.98 |
| 4 | Vugar Mehdiyev (AZE) | 11.14 Q | 11.01 |
| 5 | Jonathan Ntutu (RSA) | 11.32 q | 11.06 |
| 6 | Radoslav Zlatanov (BUL) | 11.32 Q | 11.11 |
| 7 | Royal Mitchell (USA) | 11.34 Q | 11.17 |
| 8 | Andre Luiz Andrade (BRA) | 11.45 q | 11.18 |
| 9 | Neil Fachie (GBR) | 11.53 | |
| 10 | Ihar Hartunau (BLR) | 11.54 | |
| 11 | Per Jonsson (SWE) | 11.71 | |
| 12 | Mohammed Fannouna (PLE) | 11.74 | |
| 13 | Biondi Misasi (SUR) | 11.87 | |
