= Zakout =

Zakout or Zagout (Arabic: زقوت) is a surname. Notable people with the surname include:

- Wael Zaqout, Palestinian former Minister of Planning and International Cooperation
- Heba Zagout (1984–2023), Palestinian artist and schoolteacher
- Sameh Zakout, Palestinian rapper
- Khamis Zaqout, Palestinian paralympic athlete
