= Athletics at the 2015 Parapan American Games – Men's 100 metres T13 =

Athletics – Men's 100 metres T13 at the 2015 Parapan American Games
- Venue: CIBC Athletics Stadium
- Dates: August 11
- Competitors: 6 from 4 nations

Medalists
1st place, gold medalist(s)		Gustavo Faria Araujo	Brazil
2nd place, silver medalist(s)		Luis Gutierrez	Cuba
3rd place, bronze medalist(s)		Daniel Manrique	Mexico

The men's T13 100 metres competition of the athletics events at the 2015 Parapan American Games was held on August 11 at the CIBC Athletics Stadium. The defending Parapan American Games champion was Luis Felipe Gutiérrez of Cuba.

== Records ==
Prior to this competition, the existing records were as follows:

World record	Jason Smyth (IRL)	10.46	London, Great Britain	1 September 2012
Americas Record	Luis Felipe Gutiérrez (CUB)	10.87	Guadalajara, Mexico	15 November 2011
Parapan Am Record	Luis Felipe Gutiérrez (CUB)	10.86	Guadalajara, Mexico	14 November 2011

== Schedule ==
All times are Central Standard Time (UTC-6).

Date	Time	Round
11 August	17:52	Final

== Results ==
All times are shown in seconds.

KEY:	q	Fastest non-qualifiers	Q	Qualified	PR	Parapan American Games record	NR	National record	PB	Personal best	SB	Seasonal best	DSQ	Disqualified	FS	False start

=== Final ===
Wind +4.3 m/s

Rank	Name	Nation	Time	Notes
1st place, gold medalist(s)	Gustavo Faria Araujo	Brazil	10.67	
2nd place, silver medalist(s)	Luis Gutierrez	Cuba	10.92	
3rd place, bronze medalist(s)	Daniel Manrique	Mexico	11.09	
4	Markeith Price	United States	11.24	
5	Tyson Gunter	United States	11.33	
6	Angel Jimenez	Cuba	11.36	
