= Abderrahim Zhiou =

Tunisian Paralympic athlete

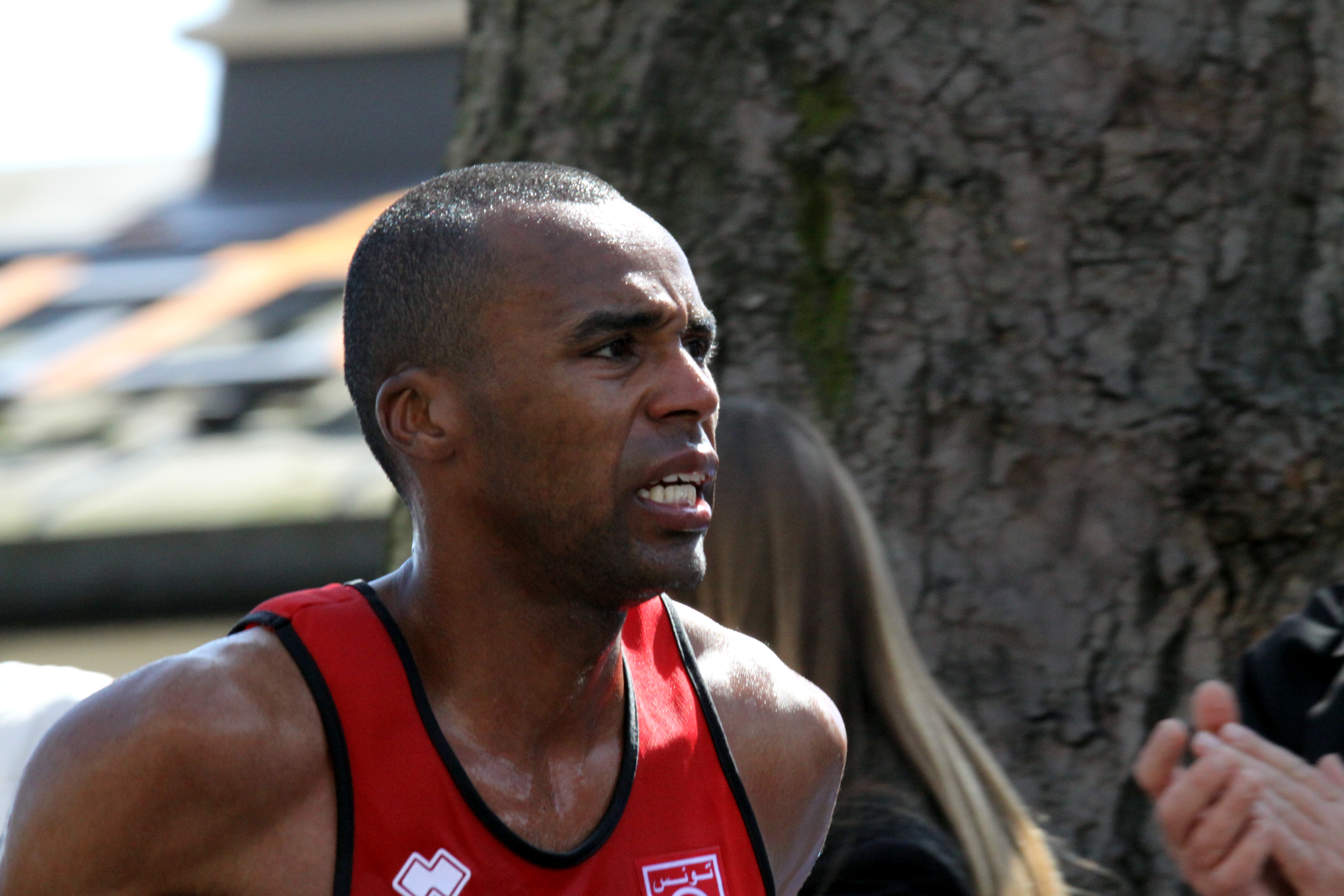

Personal information
- Native name: عبد الرحيم زهيو
- Nickname: Zizou
- Born: Abderrahim Zhiou; September 26, 1985 (age 41) Gabès, Tunisia
- Education: Higher Institute of Sport and Physical Education, Sfax, TUN (ISSEPS)
- Years active: 2002–present (Track and field T12)
- Height: 1.84 m (6 ft 0 in)
- Weight: 65 kg (143 lb)

Sport
- Disability: Visual impairment
- Disability class: T12, T13
- Events: T12 – 500 metres T12 – 800 metres T13 – 1500 metres T12 – Men's Marathon
- Club: Tunisian Federation of Sports for the Disabled: Gabès, TUN
- Coached by: Hedi Najah

Achievements and titles
- Personal bests: 800 m T12: 01:52.13 (2008, WR); 1500 m T13: 3:48.31 (2012, WR)
Medal record
Men's paralympic athletics
Representing Tunisia
Paralympic Games
Gold medal – first place	2008 Beijing	800 m T12
Gold medal – first place	2012 London	1500 m T13
Gold medal – first place	2012 London	800 m T12
Silver medal – second place	2008 Beijing	10000 m T12
Silver medal – second place	2012 London	5000 m T12
Bronze medal – third place	2012 London	Marathon T12
IPC World Championships
Gold medal – first place	2011 Christchurch	10000 m T12
Gold medal – first place	2011 Christchurch	1500 m T12
Gold medal – first place	2011 Christchurch	5000 m T12
Gold medal – first place	2011 Christchurch	800 m T12
Gold medal – first place	2013 Lyon	1500 m T12
Silver medal – second place	2013 Lyon	5000 m T12
Silver medal – second place	2013 Lyon	800 m T12

Abderrahim Zhiou (Arabic: عبد الرحيم زهيو, born September 26, 1985) is a Tunisian Paralympic athlete competing mainly in category T12 middle-distance events. He is a six-time Paralympic medalist, is an African record holder, and trains with the Tunisian Federation of Sports for the Disabled team based at Gabès.

== Biography ==
Abderrahim born on 26 September 1985 in Gabès. He started the sport in 1996 aged 11, but his visual impairment was an obstacle in front of his goal to be a professional basketball player. Two years later, he joined the Tunisian Federation of Sports for the Disabled team based at Gabès.

The international debut of Abderrahim was in an international tournament in Morocco, in 2002.

== Achievements ==
He competed in the 2012 Summer Paralympics in London, UK. There he won 2 gold medals in the men's 800 metres and 1500 metres – T12 event, a silver medal in the men's 5000 metres — T12 event, and a bronze medal in the men's Marathon — T12 event.

In 2011, Zhiou won the World Champion title in 800, 1500, 5000 and 10000 meters T12 events.

He competed in the 2008 Summer Paralympics in Beijing, China. There he won a gold medal in the men's 800 metres — T12 event and a silver medal in the men's 10,000 metres — T12, finished fourth in the men's Marathon — T12 event and finished sixth in the men's Pentathlon — P12 event.

== IPC world records and memorable moment ==
Spain's Abel Avila seemed to have everything in control, taking the lead from the start and holding it until halfway into the second lap when Lazaro Raschid Aguilar of Cuba overtook and sped off. It looked like Aguilar had sealed the deal when suddenly 10 meters from the finish line, Tunisia's Abderrahim Zhiou stole up from behind and won in a world record-breaking 1:52.13. Aguilar settled for silver with 1:52.40, and Odair Santos of Brazil took the bronze by finishing 1:53.73. Avila finished fourth with 1:55.17.

In the 2012 Summer Paralympics in London, Abderrahim became the owner of the IPC world records in 1500 m T13 event with a timing of 3:48.31.

== See also ==
- Tunisia at the 2012 Summer Paralympics
- Tunisia at the Paralympics
