= Raed Salem =

Egyptian Paralympic javelin thrower

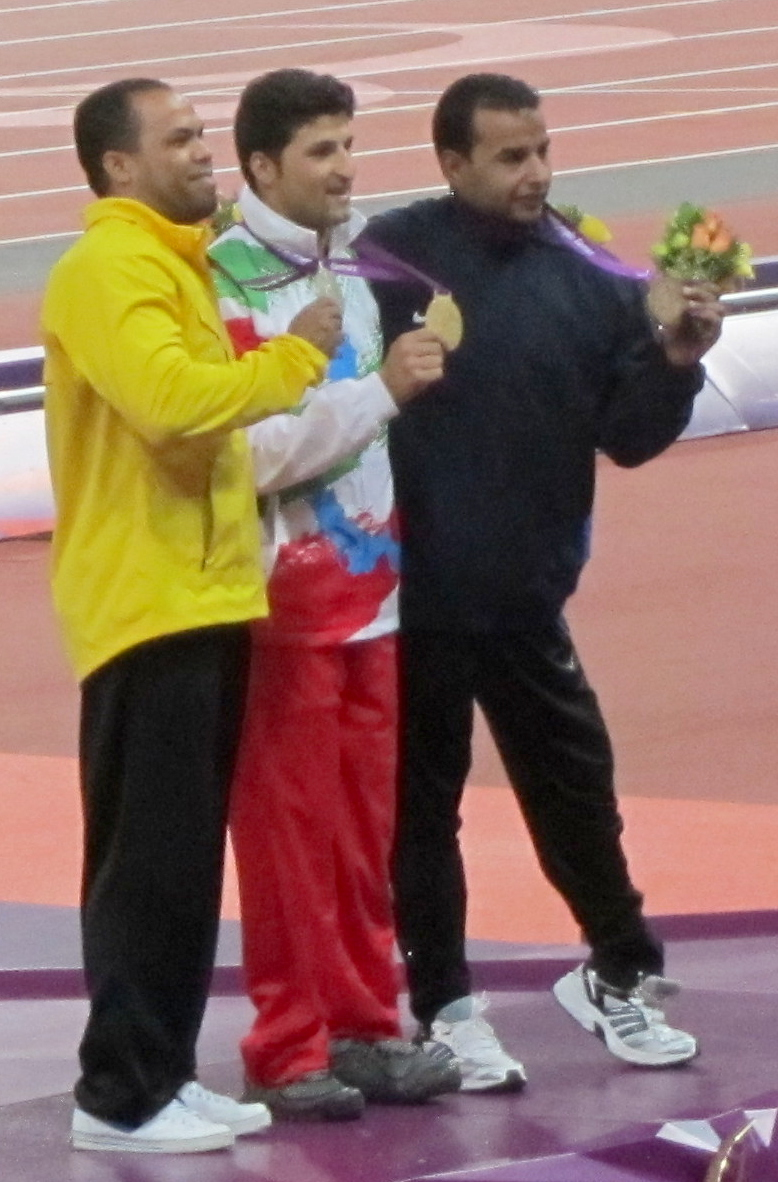
- Salem (right) at the 2012 Paralympics

Personal information
- Nationality: Egyptian
- Born: 16 May 1982 (age 44)

Sport
- Country: Egypt
- Sport: Athletics
- Disability class: F57
- Event: javelin throw
Medal record
Paralympic athletics
Representing Egypt
Paralympic Games
Bronze medal – third place	2012 London	Javelin F57/58
IPC Athletics World Championships
Bronze medal – third place	2013 Lyon	Javelin F57/58
Pan Arab Games
Gold medal – first place	2011 Doha	Javelin F57/58

Raed Salem (born 16 May 1982) is a Paralympian javelin thrower from Egypt who competes in category F57 events. He won bronze medals at the 2012 Paralympics and 2013 World Championships.
