= Alexander Zverev (sprinter) =

Russian Paralympic sprinter

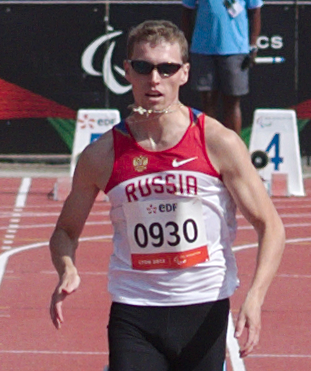
- Zverev competing at the 2013 IPC World Championships

Personal information
- Nationality: Russian
- Born: 7 November 1989 (age 36) Chelyabinsk, Russia

Sport
- Country: Russia
- Sport: Paralympic athletics
- Disability: visual impairment
- Disability class: T13
- Event: Sprint
- Coached by: Victor Slobodchikov
Medal record
Event	1st	2nd	3rd
Paralympic Games	0	1	0
World Championships	2	1	0
European Championships	1	1	0
Paralympic athletics
Representing Russia
Paralympic Games
Silver medal – second place	2012 London	400m – T13
IPC World Championships
Gold medal – first place	2011 Christchurch	400m – T13
Silver medal – second place	2013 Lyon	400m – T13
Gold medal – first place	2013 Lyon	4 × 100 m – T11–13
IPC European Championships
Gold medal – first place	2014 Swansea	200m – T13
Silver medal – second place	2014 Swansea	400m – T13

Alexander Zverev (born 7 November 1989) is a Paralympian athlete from Russia competing mainly in category T13 sprint events. Zverev has competed at two Summer Paralympic Games, 2008 in Beijing and 2012 at London. At the 2012 Games he won silver in the 400m sprint.

== Personal history ==
Zverev was born in Chelyabinsk, Russia in 1989.

== Career history ==
Zverev took up athletics at the age of 13. Due to a visual impairment he was eligible to compete in parasports and was classified as a T13 athlete, for sportspeople with poor vision, but who do not require a running guide. Initially coached by Sergey Nazarov, he qualified for the 2008 Summer Paralympic Games in Beijing where he took part in the 400m T13 event. At the Games he qualified through the heats to take part in the final, where he finished fifth.

In the buildup to the 2012 Games, Zverev took part in the 2011 IPC Athletics World Championships held in Christchurch. There he took the gold medal in his favoured 400m sprint, with a time of 49.41, a championship record. The following year he represented Russia at the 2012 Summer Paralympics in London. He qualified for two events, the 200m T13 and 400m T13 sprints. In the 200m sprint he qualified through his heat in first place, but missed out on a medal by 0.04 seconds, finishing in fourth place. In the 400m he qualified comfortably through the heats to reach the final. At the final, despite running a personal best of 48.83, he was beaten into the silver medal position by fellow countryman Alexey Labzin.

At the 2013 IPC Athletics World Championships in Lyon he entered two events and won medals in both. He was part of the Russian men's 4 × 100 metres relay team who took gold and won silver in the 400 metres, this time beaten by Namibian newcomer Johannes Nambala. The following year he took part in his first European Championships, travelling to Swansea in Wales to compete at the 2014 IPC Athletics European Championships. Despite winning the 200m sprint, he failed to clinch gold in the 400m, losing out to team-mate Egor Sharov.

In 2015, in the buildup to the Summer Paralympics in Rio, Zverev failed a drug test taken during an IPC Athletics Grand Prix held at Berlin in June. After winning the 200m sprint at Berlin, his urine sample tested positive for Cannabinoids (cannabis) and he was subsequently banned from athletics for nine months.
