= Athletics at the 2008 Summer Paralympics – Men's 400 metres T13 =

The Men's 400m T13 had its first round held on September 9, beginning at 17:15 and the Final on September 10, at 19:05.

== Medalists ==
| Gold | Luis Manuel Galano; Cuba |
| Silver | Freddy Durruthy; Cuba |
| Bronze | Ioannis Protos; Greece |

== Results ==
| Place | Athlete | Round 1 | Final |
|---|---|---|---|
| 1 | Luis Manuel Galano (CUB) | 49.28 Q PR | 49.12 PR |
| 2 | Freddy Durruthy (CUB) | 49.92 Q | 49.52 |
| 3 | Ioannis Protos (GRE) | 50.43 Q | 49.99 |
| 4 | Abdelillah Mame (MAR) | 49.96 Q | 50.01 |
| 5 | Alexander Zverev (RUS) | 50.43 Q | 50.05 |
| 6 | Zine Eddine Sekhri (ALG) | 50.05 Q | 50.24 |
| 7 | Andrew Adimo Auma (KEN) | 51.03 q | 50.70 |
| 8 | Royal Mitchell (USA) | 51.15 q | 51.23 |
| 9 | Marc Lembeck (GER) | 52.09 | |
| 10 | Rachid Ait Mala (MAR) | 52.64 | |
| 11 | Gilson Anjos (BRA) | 53.39 | |
| 12 | Manuel Beeler (SUI) | 55.42 | |
