= Palestine at the Paralympics =

- Palestinian flag
- IPC code: PLE
- NPC: Palestinian Paralympic Committee
- Medals Ranked 116th: Gold 0 Silver 1 Bronze 2 Total 3

Summer appearances
- 2000; 2004; 2008; 2012; 2016; 2020; 2024

The State of Palestine compete as Palestine at the Paralympic Games. Their first participation came at the Sydney Paralympics in 2000, where Husam Azzam won bronze in the shot put event. Palestinian athletes have won three Paralympic medals to date: a silver and two bronze.

== History and background ==
The Palestinian Paralympic Committee was established in 1996 and recognized by the International Paralympic Committee in 1998. Palestinian athletes face operational challenges as a result of the Israeli occupation of the West Bank and the Gaza Strip, including restrictions on movement within the West Bank and between the Gaza Strip and West Bank, travel permit delays for international qualifiers, and limited access to specialized training equipment and adaptive devices due to import restrictions.

In November 2012, the Palestinian Paralympic Committee's headquarters in Gaza City, along with its main training stadium used for the 2012 Summer Paralympics, was destroyed during Israeli airstrikes.

Several Palestinian Paralympians acquired their mobility impairments directly from conflict-related incidents in the region. Shot putter and wheelchair basketball player Fadi Aldeeb, who served as Palestine's sole representative at the 2024 Summer Paralympics in Paris, became paraplegic after being shot in the spine by an Israeli sniper in 2001 during the Second Intifada. In the lead-up to the event, concerns were raised about the ability of Palestinian athletes to participate due to the destruction of sporting facilities and the exposure to potential harm amid the Gaza war. Paracyclist Hazem Suleiman, a member of the Gaza Sunbirds who had his leg amputated after being shot during the 2018–2019 Gaza border protests, was unable to compete after the outbreak of the Gaza war halted his training.

== Medal tables ==
=== Medals by Summer Games ===
Games	Athletes	Gold	Silver	Bronze	Total	Rank
2000 Sydney	2	0	0	1	1	64
2004 Athens	2	0	1	1	2	64
2008 Beijing	2	0	0	0	0	–
2012 London	2	0	0	0	0	–
2016 Rio de Janeiro	1	0	0	0	0	–
2020 Tokyo	1	0	0	0	0	–
2024 Paris	1	0	0	0	0	–
Total		0	1	2	3	116

=== Medals by Summer sport ===
Sport	Gold	Silver	Bronze	Total
Athletics	0	1	2	3
Totals (1 entries)	0	1	2	3

== See also ==
- Palestine Olympic Committee
- Palestine at the Olympics
