= Judo at the 2008 Summer Paralympics – Men's 100 kg =

Judo competition

Judo - Men's 100 kg at the XIII Paralympic Games
- Venue: Beijing Workers' Gymnasium
- Date: 9 September 2008
- Competitors: 11 from 11 nations

Medalists
1st place, gold medalist(s)		Antonio Tenorio Silva	Brazil
2nd place, silver medalist(s)		Karim Sardarov	Azerbaijan
3rd place, bronze medalist(s)		Juan Carlos Cortada	Cuba
3rd place, bronze medalist(s)		Mykola Lyivytskyi	Ukraine

The men's 100 kg judo competition at the 2008 Summer Paralympics was held on 9 September at the Beijing Workers' Gymnasium.

This event was the second-heaviest of the men's judo weight classes, limiting competitors to a maximum of 100 kilograms of body mass. Like all other judo events, bouts lasted five minutes. If the bout was still tied at the end, it was extended for another five-minute, sudden-death period; if neither judoka scored during that period, the match is decided by the judges. The tournament bracket consisted of a single-elimination contest culminating in a gold medal match. There was also a repechage to determine the winners of the two bronze medals. Each judoka who had lost to a semifinalist competed in the repechage. The two judokas who lost in the semifinals faced the winner of the opposite half of the bracket's repechage in bronze medal bouts.

A total of eleven judokas competed in the event. A twelfth competitor, Ahmed Kebaili of Algeria, was disqualified for failing a pre-match medical exam. He was to have had a bye in the first round followed by a bout against the winner of the Bill Morgan-Mykola Lyivytskyi match. Because of Kebaili's disqualification, the winner of the Morgan-Lyivytskyi match instead received a bye into the third round.

== Final ranking ==
Rank	Name
Gold medal	Antonio Tenorio Silva (BRA)
Silver medal	Karim Sardarov (AZE)
Bronze medal	Juan Carlos Cortada (CUB)
Bronze medal	Mykola Lyivytskyi (UKR)
5	Myles Porter (USA)
5	Haruka Hirose (JPN)
7	Bill Morgan (CAN)
7	Gerald Rollo (FRA)

== Tournament results ==
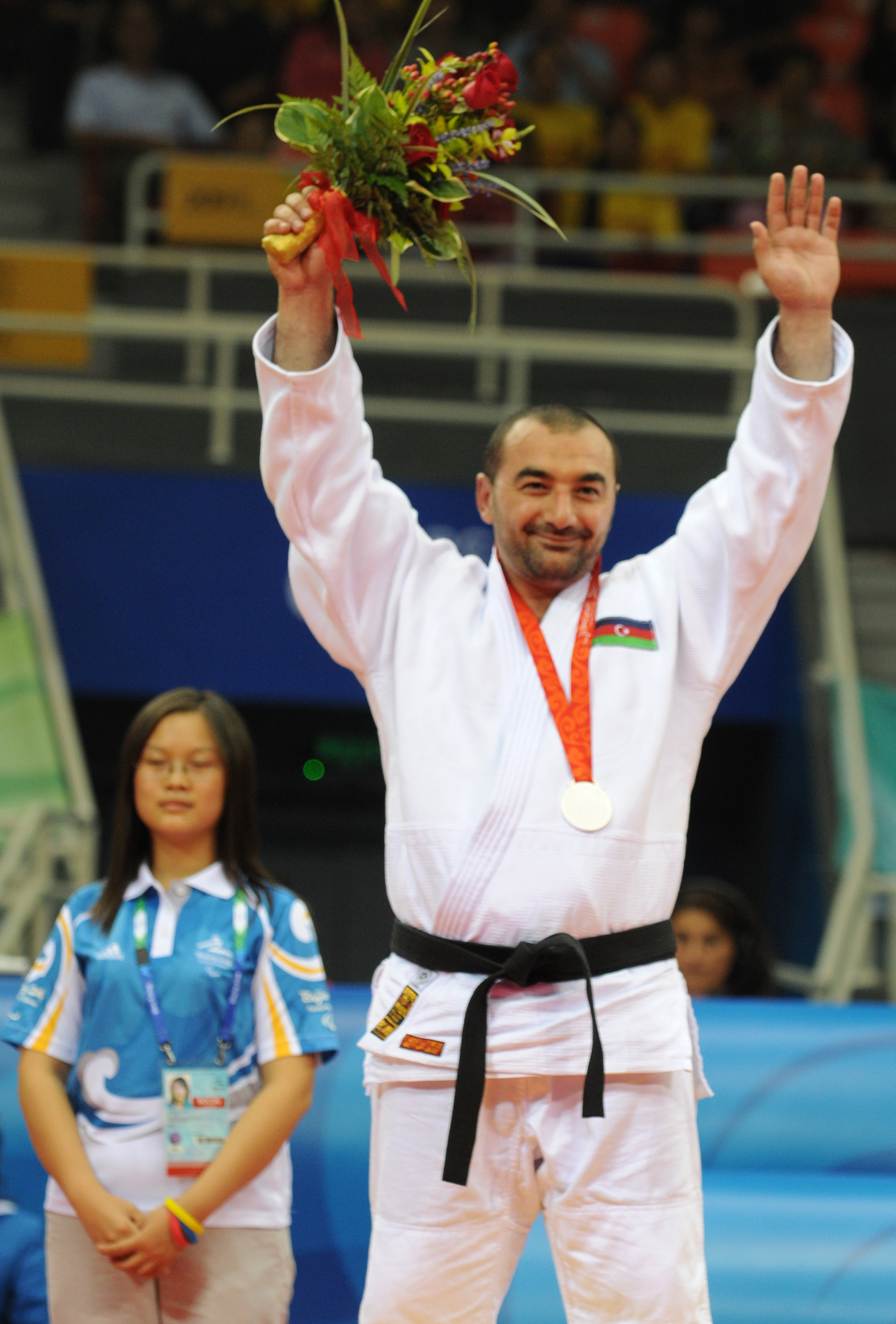
Silver medalist Karim Sardarov at the awarding ceremony

First Round
Bill Morgan (CAN)	0000
Mykola Lyivytskyi (UKR)	0200
Hamzeh Nadri (IRI)	0000^{1}
Antonio Tenorio Silva (BRA)	1001
Juan Carlos Cortada (CUB)	1000
Gerald Rollo (FRA)	0000
Haruka Hirose (JPN)	0002^{1}
Ian Rose (GBR)	0001

Quarterfinals
Bye
Mykola Lyivytskyi (UKR)
Myles Porter (USA)	0000^{1}
Antonio Tenorio Silva (BRA)	1001
Anatoly Vlasov (RUS)	0000^{1}
Juan Carlos Cortada (CUB)	1001
Karim Sardarov (AZE)	1001^{1}
Haruka Hirose (JPN)	0001^{1}

Semifinals
Mykola Lyivytskyi (UKR)	0000^{1}
Antonio Tenorio Silva (BRA)	1011
Juan Carlos Cortada (CUB)	0000
Karim Sardarov (AZE)	1000

Final
Antonio Tenorio Silva (BRA)	1101
Karim Sardarov (AZE)	0000^{3}

=== Repechage ===
First round
Bill Morgan (CAN)
Bye
Hamzeh Nadri (IRI)	0000
Myles Porter (USA)	1000
Gerald Rollo (FRA)	0010
Anatoly Vlasov (RUS)	0000
Haruka Hirose (JPN)
Bye

Second round
Bill Morgan (CAN)	0000
Myles Porter (USA)	0200
Gerald Rollo (FRA)	0010^{3}
Haruka Hirose (JPN)	0100^{2}

Bronze medal finals
Myles Porter (USA)	0000
Juan Carlos Cortada (CUB)	1000
Haruka Hirose (JPN)	0001^{3}
Mykola Lyivytskyi (UKR)	0100^{1}
