= Athletics at the 2008 Summer Paralympics – Men's 800 metres T12 =

The Men's 800m T12 had its first round held on September 8, beginning at 9:40AM and its Final held on September 10 at 20:18PM.

== Medalists ==
Gold	Abderrahim Zhiou; Tunisia
Silver	Lazaro Raschid Aguilar; Cuba
Bronze	Odair Santos; Brazil

== Results ==
Place	Athlete	Class	Round 1	Final
1	Abderrahim Zhiou (TUN)	T12	1:56.01 Q	1:52.13 WR
2	Lazaro Raschid Aguilar (CUB)	T12	1:56.98 Q	1:52.40
3	Odair Santos (BRA)	T12	1:56.77 Q	1:53.73
4	Abel Avila (ESP)	T12	1:56.60 q	1:55.17
5	Ignacio Avila (ESP)	T12	1:56.95	
6	Robert Rumanowski (POL)	T12	1:57.89	
7	Miguel Angel Arroyo (ESP)	T12	1:58.07	
8	Samwel Mushai Kimani (KEN)	T11	2:00.08 PR	
9	Ian Speed (AUS)	T12	2:01.48	
10	Jason Dunkerley (CAN)	T11	2:03.60	
11	Lassam Katongo (ZAM)	T12	2:09.03	
12	Maxim Kirillov (RUS)	T12	2:35.10	
	Pedro Guilhermino (BRA)	T12	DNS	
