= Fadi Aldeeb =

Palestinian athlete (born 1984)

Personal information
- Native name: فادي الديب
- Born: 1 September 1984 (age 41) Shuja'iyya, Gaza City, Palestine

Sport
- Country: Palestine
- Sport: Para-athletics
- Disability class: F55
- Event: Shot put

Fadi J. S. Aldeeb (Arabic: فادي الديب; born 1 September 1984) is a Palestinian para-athlete. He competed at the 2024 Summer Paralympics in the F55 shot put event and was the only Palestinian representative at the games.

== Biography ==
Aldeeb was born in Shuja'iyya, Gaza City. He started competing in sports at age 10 and was coached by Mohammed Al-Sheikh Khalil. Aldeeb was a member of a local club and competed in football, volleyball and tennis. He entered the Palestine national volleyball team at age 16.

Aldeeb studied computer science and was prepared to enroll at Al-Azhar University in Gaza in 2001. During the Second Intifada, in October 2001, Aldeeb was shot in the back by an Israeli sniper, fracturing his T11 and T12 vertebra and leaving him paralyzed. He spent 14 months in two hospitals recovering from his injuries. In 2004, he began playing wheelchair basketball, and he started participating in para-athletics in 2007, specializing in shot put, discus throw and the javelin throw. He competed internationally in para-athletics and won six medals at the Tunis International Athletics Meetings for the Disabled.

Aldeeb competed in wheelchair basketball in France, Turkey and Greece. He was a member of the Paris-based club Hurricane 92 Basketball as of 2024 and also coached the fourth and fifth squads of the club Paris Basket Fauteuil. He was selected for the Palestine national team in 2019. Due to the Israel-Palestine conflict, he has not spent time in Gaza since 2014, and lives in France.

Aldeeb attempted to make the 2012 Summer Paralympics, but was unable to due to a shoulder injury. During the 2024 Israel–Hamas war, 17 members of his family were killed, including his brother and two nephews. He was invited to compete at the 2024 Summer Paralympics and competed in the F55 shot put event. He was the only Palestinian at the 2024 Paralympics and, as such, carried the Palestinian flag at the opening Paralympic ceremony. He finished with a placement of 10th in his event.
