= Alexey Labzin =

Russian Paralympic sprinter

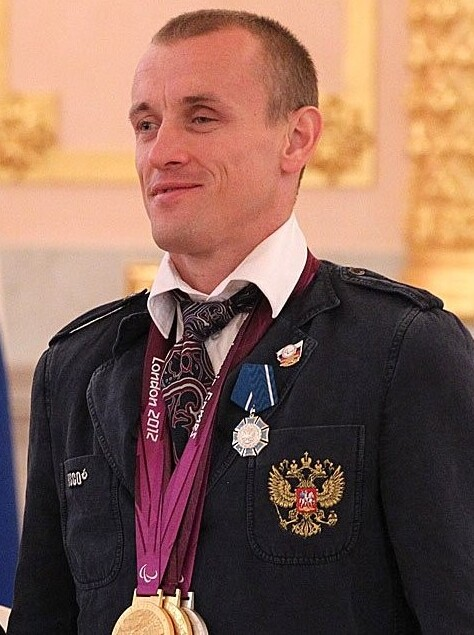
- Alexey Labzin in 2012

Personal information
- Born: 7 December 1978 (age 47) Vidim, Irkutsk Oblast, Russia

Sport
- Sport: Track and field (T13)
Medal record
Men's paralympic athletics
Representing Russia
Paralympic Games
Gold medal – first place	2012 London	400 m T13
Gold medal – first place	2012 London	4 × 100 m T11–T13
Silver medal – second place	2008 Beijing	100 m T13
Silver medal – second place	2008 Beijing	200 m T13
Silver medal – second place	2012 London	200 m T13
IPC World Championships
Gold medal – first place	2011 Christchurch	100 m T13
IPC European Championships
Gold medal – first place	2014 Swansea	4 × 100 m T11–T13

Alexey Labzin (born 7 December 1978) is a Paralympian athlete from Russia competing mainly in category T13 sprint. He won two gold and three silver medals in 100–400 m events at the 2008 and 2012 Summer Paralympics.

Labzin is married and has two sons. He was born and raised in Vidim, Irkutsk Oblast, but after the death of his coach moved to Ufa.
