= Khamis Zaqout =

Palestinian Paralympic athlete (born 1965)

Khamis Zaquot
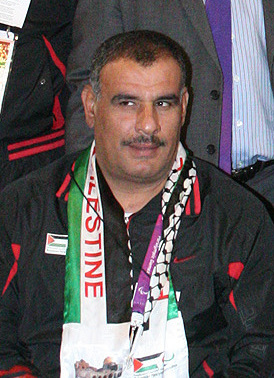
- Khamis Zaquot in 2016

Personal information
- Nationality: Palestinian
- Born: 6 February 1965 (age 61) Gaza Strip
- Occupation: Paralympic athlete
Medal record
Men's para athletics
Representing Palestine
Arab Games
Gold medal – first place	2011 Doha	Shot put F54/55/56
Bronze medal – third place	2011 Doha	Javelin throw F54/55/56

Khamis Zaquot (born 6 December 1965 in Gaza Strip) is a Palestinian paralympic athlete.

== Personal life ==
He has nine children. He was injured in 1992 after falling while working on a construction site in Israel, and has been using a wheelchair since then. From there he began his sports career. After receiving treatment for several years a rehabilitation center in Ramallah, by 2012 he was residing in a refugee camp in Khan Younis. In 2011 he was the focus of a documentary produced by the British television channel Channel, which presented the Paralympic athletes of Gaza.

== Sports career ==
He started practicing swimming and basketball (where he became captain of the Palestinian team), until he approached athletics. In 2012 he trained in a park in the city of Gaza.

He participated in the 1998 world championship, finishing second in discus throwing, fourth in javelin throwing and fifth in shot put. He has participated in Asian competitions.

== London 2012 ==
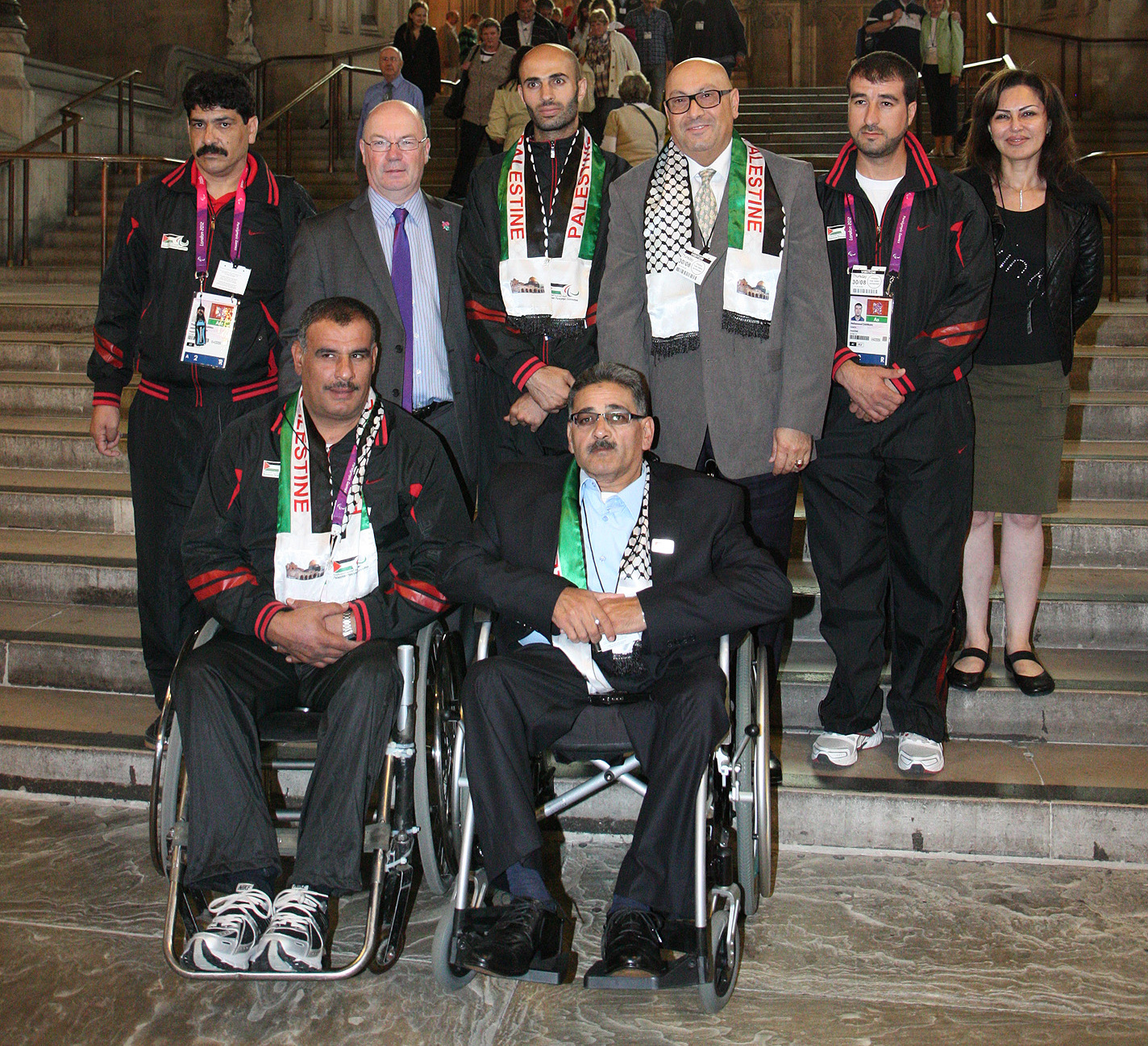
Team of Palestine at the 2012 London Paralympic Games

He participated in the 2012 Summer Paralympic Games in London (United Kingdom ), where he was the flag bearer of the Palestinian delegation. Accessed the Games after qualifying in Doha, won in shot put with 10.77 meters, shortly after establishing an Asian record of 11.34.

Earlier in the qualifying events in Dubai (UAE) established a new world record in launching Paralympics weight (at a distance of 11.40 meters) and won five gold medals. For the London Games he continued his training in Qatar.

He competed in the throwing, discus and javelin events. His best result was obtained in the first event, being in fourth place with a throw of 11.30 meters.

== See also ==
- Palestine at the Paralympics
