= David Devine (athlete) =

British Paralympic athlete

Personal information
- Nationality: British
- Born: 13 February 1992 (age 34) Liverpool, England

Sport
- Country: Great Britain
- Sport: athletics
- Events: 800m and 1500m (T12/13)
- Club: Liverpool Harriers

Achievements and titles
- Personal bests: 400m 51.90; 800m 1:54.34; 1500m 3:49.79; 5000m 14:34.46
Medal record
Track and field (athletics)
Representing Great Britain
Paralympic Games
Bronze medal – third place	2012 London	Men's 800m – T12
Bronze medal – third place	2012 London	Men's 1500m – T13
IPC World Championships
Bronze medal – third place	2011 Christchurch	Men's 800m – T12
IPC European Championships
Silver medal – second place	2016 Grosseto	Men's 1500m – T13

David Devine (born 13 February 1992) is a British Paralympic athlete. Devine competes in T12 and T13 middle-distance track events, and has represented Great Britain in both the 2011 IPC Athletics World Championships and the 2012 Summer Paralympics.

== Career history ==
Devine was born in Liverpool, England in 1992. Devine, who has a visual impairment, took up athletics after attending the DSE Championships in Blackpool in 2008. He joined local athletics club, Liverpool Harriers, and began entering local youth meets, running in the 400 metres.

By 2009 Devine was entering both 400m and 800m events, winning at both distances in events in Britain and Europe. By the end of the year he had recorded a personal best of 51.90s in the 400m at the IBSA Open European Championships in Rhodes and a 1:58.23 in the 800m at the German Disability Championships in Sindlefingen. The next year Devine began concentrating more on the 800m, and by July he had improved his time to 1:54.34. By 2011 Devine began entering the 1500m winning local and youth meets at that distance. That year he was also selected for the Great Britain team at the 2011 IPC Athletics World Championships, running in the 800m. Despite running a time of 2:00.43, far off his best, he qualified from the heats in second place. In the final he ran 2:00.61 taking the bronze medal.

In 2012 Devine began to compete in the 5000m event, with a view of concentrating on that distance in the future. Despite this ambition, by the time of the 2012 Summer Paralympics Devine had qualified for the two distances he had built his reputation on, the 800m and 1500m.

At the London Paralympics Devine first ran in the T13 1500m. On 4 September, in the final, he ran a personal best of 3:49.79 to take the bronze medal and setting a new European record in the process. Just a day later he was back on the track in the final of the T12 800m, and although seeming out of the medals by the final bend, Devine found the acceleration in the final straight to over-take Lazaro Rashid of Cuba to take his second bronze of the Games.

At the 2016 IPC Athletics European Championships in Grosseto, Devine returned from a four-year injury to collect the silver medal in the T13 1500m.
