= Freddy Durruthy =

Cuban Paralympic athlete

Sport
- Sport: Paralympic athletics
Medal record
Representing Cuba
Paralympic Games
| Silver medal – second place | 2008 Beijing | 400m T13 |
Parapan American Games
| Bronze medal – third place | 2007 Rio de Janeiro | 400m T13 |

Freddy Durruthy is a Paralympian athlete from Cuba competing mainly in category T13 sprint events.

He competed in the 2008 Summer Paralympics in Beijing, China. There he won a silver medal in the men's 400 metres - T13 event and finished sixth in the men's 200 metres - T13 event
