= Luis Manuel Galano =

Cuban Paralympic athlete

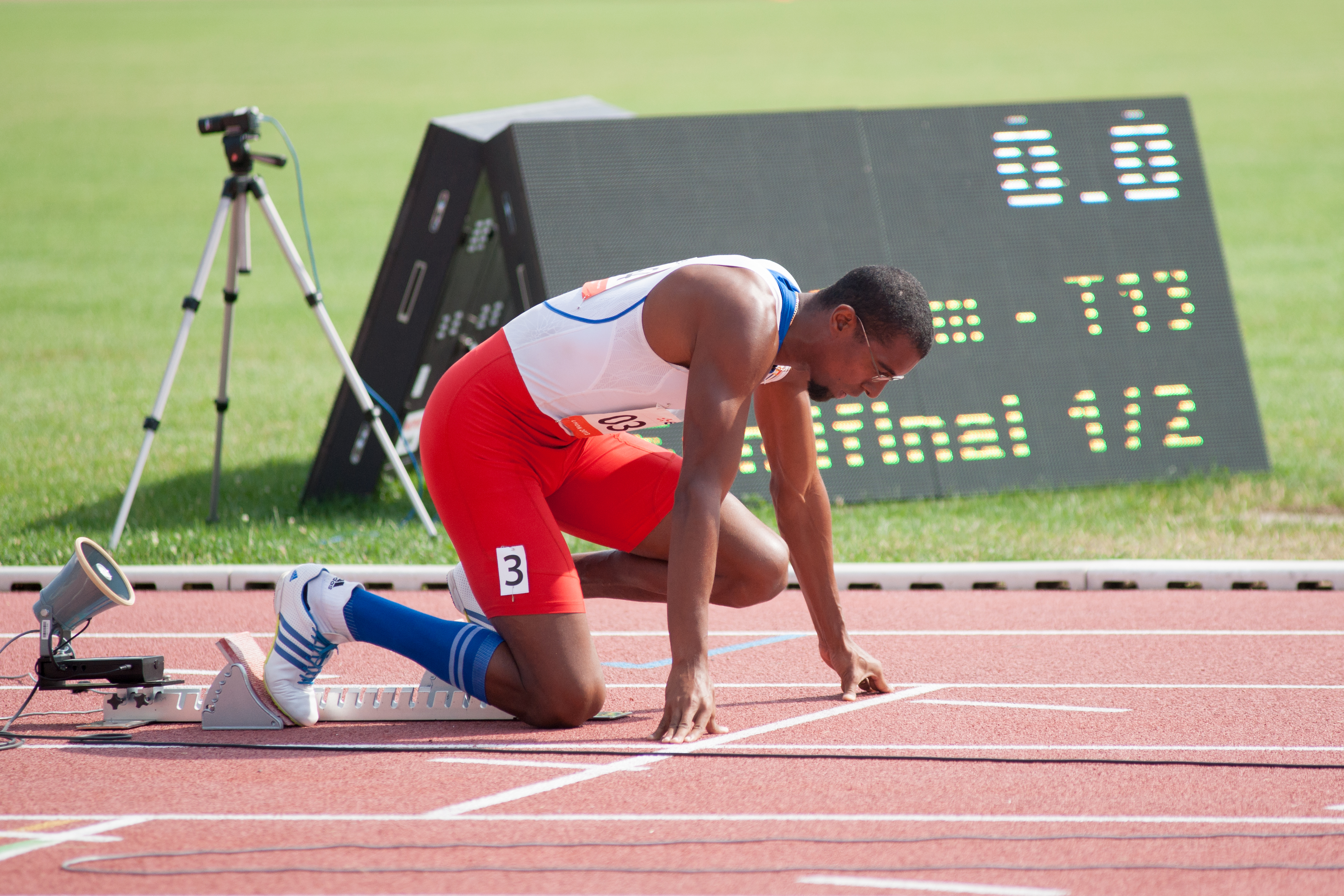
- Luis Manuel Galano at the 2013 IPC Athletics World Championships

Personal information
- Born: 21 August 1982 (age 43)

Sport
- Sport: Paralympic athletics
Medal record
Representing Cuba
Paralympic Games
Gold medal – first place	2008 Beijing	400m T13
Parapan American Games
Silver medal – second place	2015 Toronto	400m T12
Bronze medal – third place	2007 Rio de Janeiro	100m T13

Luis Manuel Galano (born August 21, 1982) is a Paralympic athlete from Cuba competing mainly in category T13 sprint events.

He competed in the 2008 Summer Paralympics in Beijing, China. There he won a gold medal in the men's 400 metres - T13 event and finished fourth in the men's 200 metres - T13 event
