= Luis Felipe Gutiérrez =

Cuban Paralympic athlete (born 1988)

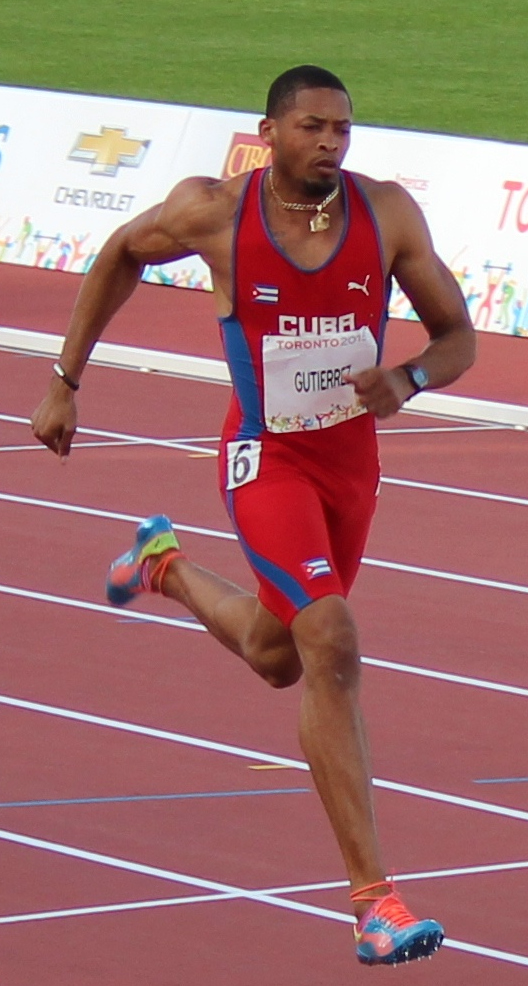
- Gutiérrez at the 2015 Parapan American Games

Personal information
- Full name: 'Luis Felipe Gutiérrez Rivero
- Born: 9 January 1988 (age 38) Pinar del Río, Cuba
- Height: 185 cm (6 ft 1 in)
- Weight: 58 kg (128 lb)

Sport
- Sport: Paralympic athletics
- Disability class: T13
- Events: Sprint, long jump
- Coached by: Luis Bueno Chavez
Medal record
Representing Cuba
Paralympic Games
Bronze medal – third place	2008 Beijing	100 m T13
Gold medal – first place	2012 London	Long jump F13
Silver medal – second place	2012 London	100 m T13
IPC World Championships
Gold medal – first place	2013 Lyon	Long jump T13
Parapan American Games
Gold medal – first place	2011 Guadalajara	Long jump T13
Gold medal – first place	2011 Guadalajara	100 m T13
Gold medal – first place	2011 Guadalajara	200 m T13
Gold medal – first place	2015 Toronto	Long jump T13
Silver medal – second place	2015 Toronto	100 m T13

Luis Felipe Gutiérrez Rivero (born 9 January 1988) is a visually impaired Paralympic athlete from Cuba. He competes in T13 sprint and F13 jumping events. He won a bronze medal in the 100 m T13 and finished fifth in the 200 m T13 event at the 2008 Summer Paralympics. At the next Paralympics he won a gold medal in the long jump F13 and a silver in the 100 m T13. He also won four gold and one silver medals at the Parapan American Games in 2011 and 2015.

Gutiérrez holds the long jump and triple jump world records for F13 classified athletes.
