= Lázaro Rashid Aguilar =

Cuban Paralympic athlete

Personal information
- Born: 9 November 1975 (age 50) Havana, Cuba

Sport
- Sport: Paralympic athletics
- Disability class: T13
- Event: 1500 metres
Medal record
Paralympic athletics
Representing Cuba
Paralympic Games
Silver medal – second place	2008 Beijing	800m T12
Silver medal – second place	2008 Beijing	1500m T13
Parapan American Games
Gold medal – first place	2011 Guadalajara	1500m T13

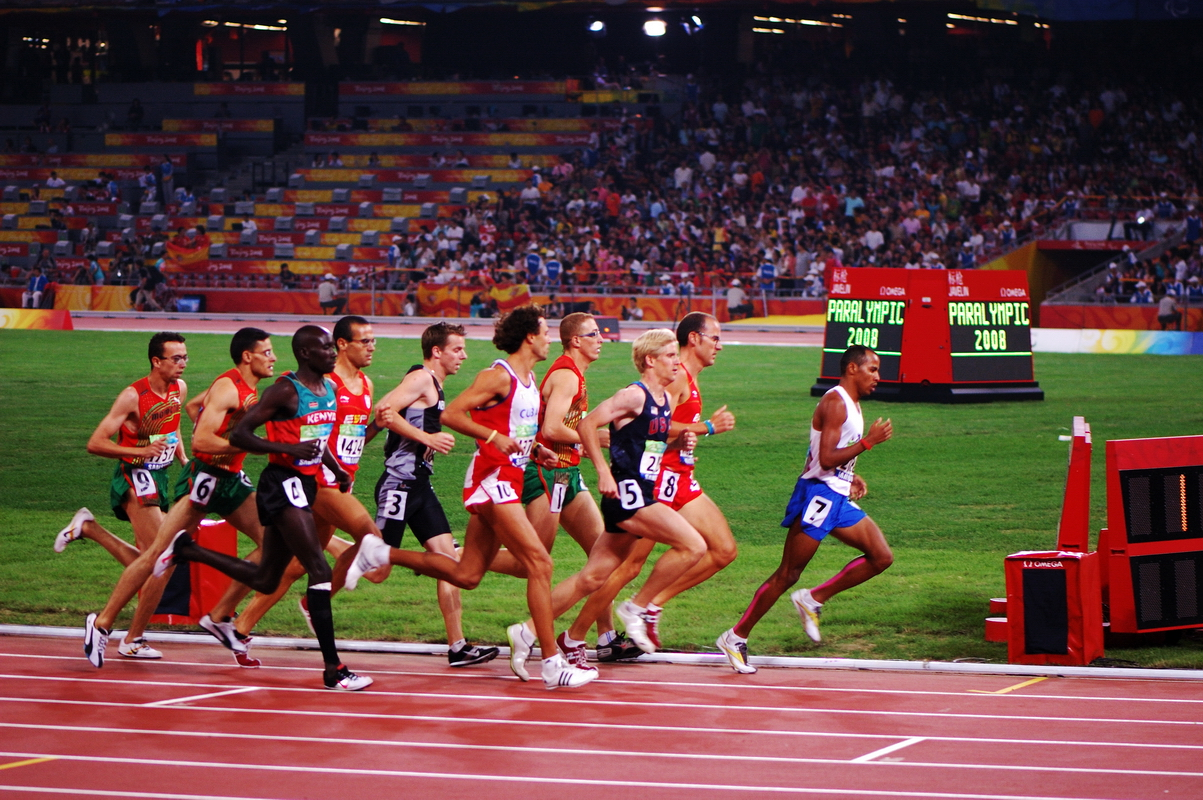
Lazaro Raschid Aguilar (number 10) in the men's 1500 metres T13 final at the 2008 Summer Paralympics

Lázaro Renato Rashid Aguilar (9 November 1975) is a Paralympian athlete from Cuba competing mainly in category T12 middle-distance events.

He competed in the 2008 Summer Paralympics in Beijing, China. There he won a silver medal in the men's 800 metres T12 event and another silver medal in the men's 1500 metres T13 event.
