= Husam Azzam =

Palestinian track and field athlete

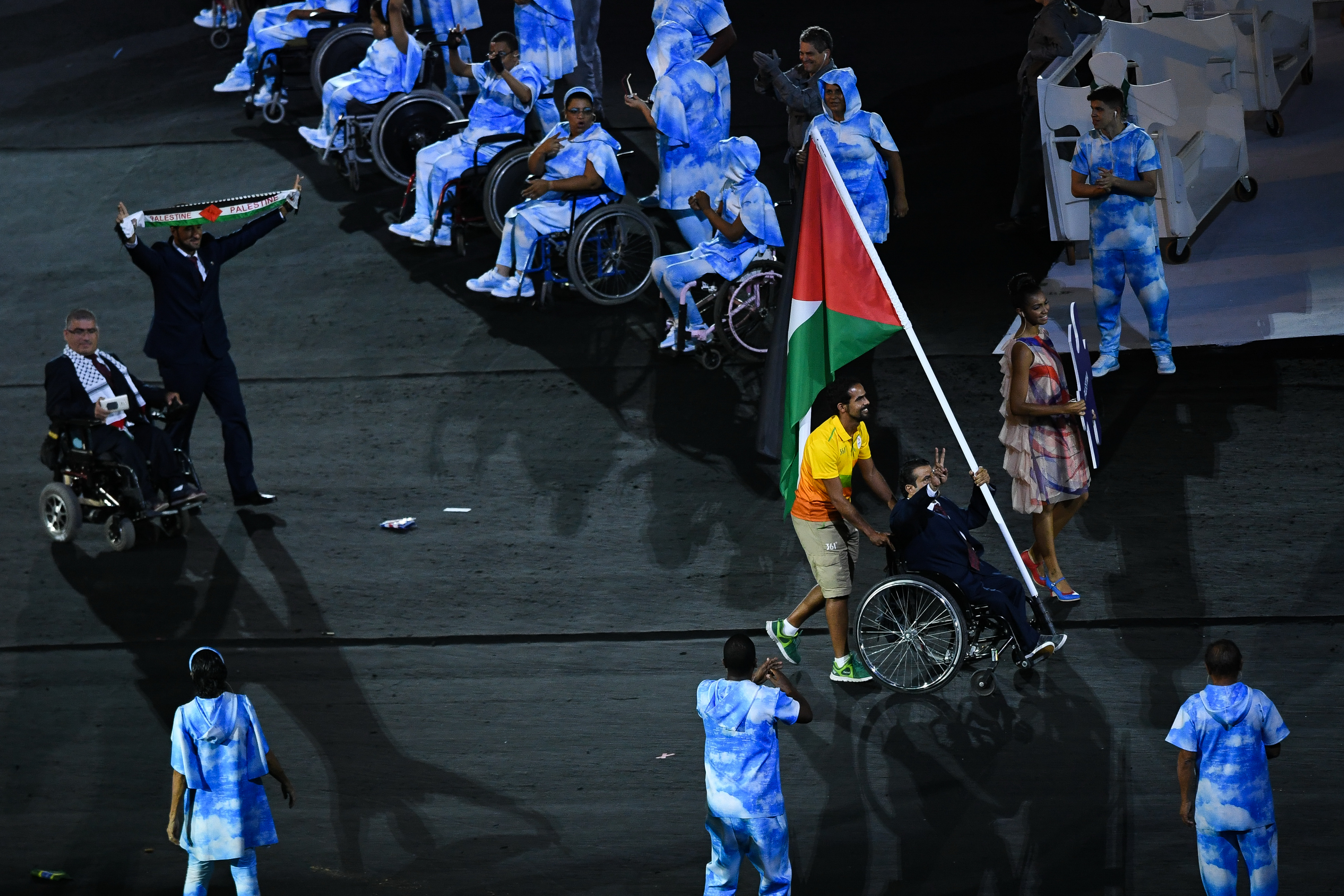
- Azzam carrying the Palestinian flag at the 2016 Summer Paralympics opening ceremony

Personal information
- Born: 7 December 1975 (age 50) Palestine
Medal record
Men's athletics
Representing Palestine
Event	1st	2nd	3rd
Paralympic Games	–	1	1
Total	0	1	1
Summer Paralympic Games
Silver medal – second place	2004 Athens	
Bronze medal – third place	2000 Sydney	

Husam Azzam (Arabic: حسام عزام, romanized: Ḥusām ʻAzzām; born 7 December 1975) is a Palestinian para athlete who competes in shot put. He has represented Palestine at five Paralympic Games, in 2000, 2004, 2008, 2016, and 2020.

== Sports career ==
Azzam began playing wheelchair basketball in 1998, marking his first foray into para-sports. He switched to shot put following the formation of the Palestinian Disabled Sports Federation.

He was, according to the International Paralympic Committee, "the first Palestinian athlete to compete in Paralympic Games" when he represented Palestine at the 2000 Summer Paralympics in Sydney. Azzam won a bronze medal in Sydney in the shot put, with a throw of 6.94 metres. It was the first Paralympic medal for Palestine.

Beginning in 2001, Mohammed Dahman has been Azzam's coach. In 2002, at the IPC Athletics World Championships in Villeneuve d'Ascq, Azzam won a silver medal in men's shot put; he also competed in men's F54 discus throw.

He represented Palestine again at the 2004 Summer Paralympics in Athens, and won silver in the shot put event. Competing for the third time at the 2008 Summer Paralympics in Beijing, he was Palestine's flagbearer during the Games' Opening Ceremony.

Azzam retired from sports in 2009, but left retirement in 2015 in the hope of competing at the 2016 Paralympics. He was the sole athlete to represent Palestine at the 2016 and 2020 Summer Paralympics. At the 2020 Paralympics, he finished eighth in the F53 shot put finals.

== Personal life ==
Azzam contracted polio at age three, which paralyzed him. He uses a wheelchair.

Azzam is from the Gaza Strip. In 2009, his parents, wife, and one son were killed when his home in the Jabalia refugee camp was destroyed by an Israeli rocket. He was able to recover his bronze medal from the rubble, but not his silver medal. During the Israel-Hamas war, Azzam and his family were trapped in northern Gaza.

He has two sons and one daughter. One of his sons, Kamal, was shot during 2018 protests, leaving his severely impaired. His other son, Mohammed, was arrested and injured during protests at the Gaza/Israel border in 2021; his leg was later amputated. His daughter has cerebral atrophy.
