= Mohammed Fannouna =

Palestinian Paralympic athlete

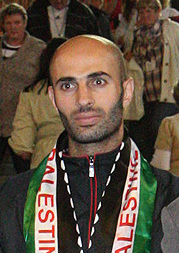

Personal information
- Born: 3 April 1980 (age 46)

Sport
- Sport: Paralympic athletics
Medal record
Paralympic athletics
Representing Palestine
Paralympic Games
Bronze medal – third place	2004 Athens	Long jump F13
Asian Para Games
Gold medal – first place	2010 Guangzhou	Long jump F13

Mohammed Fannouna (born 3 April 1980) is a paralympic athlete from Palestine competing mainly in category T13 events.

After competing in the 2004 Summer Paralympics where he won a bronze in the long jump as well as competing in the javelin, Fannouna made an unsuccessful move to the track for the 2008 Summer Paralympics competing in the 100m and 200m but failing to medal in either.
