= Palestinian Paralympic Committee =

National Paralympic Committee of Palestine

National Paralympic Committee
- Country: Palestine
- Code: PLE
- Continental association: APC
- Headquarters: Ramallah, Palestine
- President: Amer Mohammad Ali

The Palestinian Paralympic Committee (Arabic: اللجنة البارالمبية الفلسطينية) is the National Paralympic Committee of Palestine.

In 2010, the Palestinian Paralympic Committee and the global aid agency Mercy Corps, started a 2-year program, funded by the European Union (EU). The 533,000 euro (approximately, 650,000 US dollar) programme to empower Palestinian youth with disabilities, follow the research of the Sport for Development and Peace International Working Group (SDP IWG).

== See also ==
- Palestine at the Paralympics
- Palestine Olympic Committee
