= Athletics at the 2012 Summer Paralympics T/F11–13 =

Athletics at the XIV Paralympic Games
- Paralympic Athletics
- Venue: Olympic Stadium; The Mall
- Dates: 31 August – 9 September 2012
- Competitors: 1100 (740 men, 360 women)

Athletics at the 2012 Summer Paralympics
Classification
T/F11–13: Blind and visually impaired
T/F20: Intellectual disability
T/F31–38: Cerebral palsy
F40: Les Autres
T/F42–46: Amputees
T/F51–58: Spinal cord disability
Men T/F11–13
Track
100 m	T11	T12	T13
200 m	T11	T12	T13
400 m	T11	T12	T13
800 m		T12	T13
1500 m	T11		T13
5000 m	T11	T12
4×100 m relay	T11–13
Road
Marathon		T12
Field
Long jump	F11		F13
Triple jump	F11	F12
Shot put	F11–12
Discus throw	F11
Javelin throw		F12–13
Women T/F11–13
Track
100 m	T11	T12	T13
200 m	T11	T12
400 m		T12	T13
1500 m		T12
Field
Long jump	F11–12		F13
Shot put	F11–12
Discus throw	F11–12
Javelin throw		F12–13

Athletics events at the 2012 Summer Paralympics were held in the Olympic Stadium and in The Mall in London, United Kingdom, from 31 August to 9 September 2012.

== Classification ==
Athletes were given a classification depending on the type and extent of their disability. The classification system allowed athletes to compete against others with a similar level of function.

The athletics classifications are:

- 11–13: Blind (11) and visually impaired (12, 13) athletes
- 20: Athletes with an intellectual disability
- 31–38: Athletes with cerebral palsy
- 40: Les Autres (others) (including people with dwarfism)
- 42–46: Amputees
- 51–58: Athletes with a spinal cord disability

The class numbers were given prefixes of "T", "F" and "P" for track, field and pentathlon events, respectively.

Visually impaired athletes classified 11 run with full eye shades and a guide runner; those classified 12 have the option of using a guide; those classified 13 did not use a guide runner. Guide runners were awarded medals alongside their athletes.

== Schedule ==
R	Round 1	½	Semifinals	F	Final

Men
Event↓/Date →	Fri 31	Sat 1	Sun 2	Mon 3		Tue 4		Wed 5		Thr 6		Fri 7		Sat 8		Sun 9
T11 100m												R		½	F	
T12 100m				R	½	F										
T13 100m	R	F														
T11 200m				R		½	F									
T12 200m												R	½	F		
T13 200m										R	½	F				
T11 400m										R		½		F		
T12 400m			R	½						F						
T13 400m			R	F												
T12 800m				R				F								
T13 800m												R		F		
T11 1500m	R	½		F												
T13 1500m				R		F										
T11 5000m								R				F				
T12 5000m	R			F												
T11–13 4 × 100 m relay								R	F							
T12 Marathon																F
F11 Long Jump						F										
F13 Long Jump		F														
F11 Triple Jump										F						
F12 Triple Jump														F		
F11–12 Shot Put				F												
F11 Discus Throw				F												
F12–13 Javelin Throw								F								

== Medal summary ==
=== Men's events ===
Event	Classification	Gold	Silver	Bronze
100 m	T11	Xue Lei; Wang Lin (Guide); China	Lucas Prado; Justino Barbosa dos Santos (Guide); Brazil	Felipe Gomes; Leonardo Souza Lopes (Guide); Brazil
100 m	T12	Fedor Trikolich; Russia	Mateusz Michalski; Poland	Li Yansong; China
100 m	T13	Jason Smyth; Ireland	Luis Felipe Gutierrez; Cuba	Jonathan Ntutu; South Africa
200 m	T11	Felipe Gomes; Leonardo Souza Lopes (Guide); Brazil	Daniel Silva; Heitor de Oliveira Sales (Guide); Brazil	Jose Sayovo Armando; Nicolau Palanca (Guide); Angola
200 m	T12	Mateusz Michalski; Poland	Fedor Trikolich; Russia	Li Yansong; China
200 m	T13	Jason Smyth; Ireland	Alexey Labzin; Russia	Artem Loginov; Russia
400 m	T11	Jose Sayovo Armando; Nicolau Palanca (Guide); Angola	Lucas Prado; Laercio Alves Martins (Guide); Brazil	Gauthier Tresor Makunda; Antoine Laneyrie (Guide); France
400 m	T12	Mahmoud Khaldi; Tunisia	Hilton Langenhoven; South Africa	Jorge B. Gonzalez Sauceda; Mexico
400 m	T13	Alexey Labzin; Russia	Alexander Zverev; Russia	Mohamed Amguoun; Morocco
800 m	T12	Abderrahim Zhiou; Tunisia	Egor Sharov; Russia	David Devine; Great Britain
800 m	T13	Abdellatif Baka; Algeria	David Korir; Kenya	Abdelillah Mame; Morocco
1500 m	T11	Samwel Mushai Kimani; James Boit (Guide); Kenya	Odair Santos; Carlos Antonio dos Santos (Guide); Brazil	Jason Joseph Dunkerley; Josh Karanja (Guide); Canada
1500 m	T13	Abderrahim Zhiou; Tunisia	David Korir; Kenya	David Devine; Great Britain
5000 m	T11	Cristian Valenzuela; Cristopher Guajardo (Guide); Chile	Jason Joseph Dunkerley; Josh Karanja (Guide); Canada	Shinya Wada; Japan
5000 m	T12	El Amin Chentouf; Morocco	Abderrahim Zhiou; Tunisia	Henry Kirwa; Kenya
Marathon	T12	Alberto Suárez Laso; Spain	Elkin Alonso Serna Moreno; German Naranjo Jaramillo (Guide); Colombia	Abderrahim Zhiou; Tunisia
Long jump	F11	Ruslan Katyshev; Ukraine	Elexis Gillette; United States	Li Duan; China
Long jump	F13	Luis Felipe Gutierrez; Cuba	Angel Jimenez Cabeza; Cuba	Radoslav Zlatanov; Bulgaria
Triple jump	F11	Denis Gulin; Russia	Li Duan; China	Ruslan Katyshev; Ukraine
Triple jump	F12	Oleg Panyutin; Azerbaijan	Vladimir Zayets; Azerbaijan	Dong Hewei; China
Shot put	F11/12	Andrii Holivets; Ukraine	Vladimir Andryushchenko; Russia	Russell Short; Australia
Discus throw	F11	David Casino; Spain	Vasyl Lishchynskyi; Ukraine	Bil Marinkovic; Austria
Javelin throw	F12/13	Zhu Pengkai; China	Sajad Nikparast; Iran	Branimir Budetic; Croatia

=== Women's events ===
Event	Classification	Gold	Silver	Bronze
100 m	T11	Terezinha Guilhermina; Guilherme Soares de Santana (Guide); Brazil	Jerusa Geber Santos; Luiz Henrique Barboza Da Silva (Guide); Brazil	Jhulia Santos; Fabio Dias de Oliveira Silva (Guide); Brazil
100 m	T12	Zhou Guohua; Li Jie (Guide); China	Libby Clegg; Mikail Huggins (Guide); Great Britain	Oxana Boturchuk; Ukraine
100 m	T13	Omara Durand; Cuba	Ilse Hayes; South Africa	Nantenin Keïta; France
200 m	T11	Terezinha Guilhermina; Guilherme Soares de Santana (Guide); Brazil	Jerusa Geber Santos; Luiz Henrique Barboza Da Silva (Guide); Brazil	Jia Juntingxian; Xu Donglin (Guide); China
200 m	T12	Assia El Hannouni; Gautier Simounet (Guide); France	Zhou Guohua; Li Jie (Guide); China	Zhu Daqing; Zhang Hui (Guide); China
400 m	T12	Assia El Hannouni; France	Oxana Boturchuk; Ukraine	Daniela Velasco; Jose Guadalupe Fuentes Ortiz (Guide); Mexico
400 m	T13	Omara Durand; Cuba	Somaya Bousaid; Tunisia	Alexandra Dimoglou; Greece
1500 m	T12	Elena Pautova; Russia	Elena Congost; Spain	Annalisa Minetti; Andrea Giocondi (Guide); Italy
Long jump	F11/12	Oksana Zubkovska; Ukraine	Jia Juntingxian; China	Anna Kaniuk; Belarus
Long jump	F13	Ilse Hayes; South Africa	Lynda Hamri; Algeria	Anthi Karagianni; Greece
Shot put	F11/12	Assunta Legnante; Italy	Tang Hongxia; China	Zhang Liangmin; China
Discus throw	F11/12	Zhang Liangmin; China	Tang Hongxia; China	Claire Williams; Great Britain
Javelin throw	F12/13	Tanja Dragic; Serbia	Anna Sorokina; Russia	Natalija Eder; Austria

== See also ==
- Athletics at the 2012 Summer Olympics
