= Athletics at the 2012 Summer Paralympics – Women's 400 metres T12 =

Women's 400 metres T12 at the XIV Paralympic Games
- Venue: London Olympic Stadium
- Dates: 2 to 4 September
- Competitors: 14 from 11 nations
- Winning time: 55.39

Medalists
1st place, gold medalist(s)		Assia El Hannouni	France
2nd place, silver medalist(s)		Oxana Boturchuk	Ukraine
3rd place, bronze medalist(s)		Daniela Velasco; Jose Guadalupe Fuentes Ortiz	Mexico

Athletics at the 2012 Summer Paralympics
Classification
T/F11–13: Blind and visually impaired
T/F20: Intellectual disability
T/F31–38: Cerebral palsy
F40: Les Autres
T/F42–46: Amputees
T/F51–58: Spinal cord disability
Men T/F11–13
Track
100 m	T11	T12	T13
200 m	T11	T12	T13
400 m	T11	T12	T13
800 m		T12	T13
1500 m	T11		T13
5000 m	T11	T12
4×100 m relay	T11–13
Road
Marathon		T12
Field
Long jump	F11		F13
Triple jump	F11	F12
Shot put	F11–12
Discus throw	F11
Javelin throw		F12–13
Women T/F11–13
Track
100 m	T11	T12	T13
200 m	T11	T12
400 m		T12	T13
1500 m		T12
Field
Long jump	F11–12		F13
Shot put	F11–12
Discus throw	F11–12
Javelin throw		F12–13

The Women's 400 metres T12 event at the 2012 Summer Paralympics took place at the London Olympic Stadium from 2 to 4 September. The event consisted of 4 heats, 2 semifinals and a final.

The T12 category is for athletes with visual impairment. Athletes in this category will generally have some residual sight, the ability to recognise the shape of a hand at a distance of 2 metres and the ability to perceive clearly will be no more than 2/60. T12 athletes commonly run with guides.

== Records ==
Prior to the competition, the existing World and Paralympic records were as follows:

World record (T11)	Terezinha Guilhermina (BRA)	56.14	18 August 2007	Rio de Janeiro, Brazil
Paralympic record (T11)	Purificación Santamarta (ESP)	56.83	25 October 2000	Sydney, Australia
World & Paralympic record (T12)	Assia El Hannouni (FRA)	53.67	27 September 2004	Athens, Greece

== Results ==
=== Round 1 ===
Competed 2 September 2012 from 12:14. Qual. rule: winner of each heat (Q) plus the 4 fastest other times (q) qualified.

==== Heat 1 ====
Rank	Athlete	Country	Class	Time	Notes
1	Assia El Hannouni	France	T12	55.04	Q, PB
2	Daniela Velasco; Guide: Jose Guadalupe Fuentes Ortiz	Mexico	T12	58.33	q, PB
3	Maria Muchavo	Mozambique	T12	1:03.68	SB

==== Heat 2 ====
Rank	Athlete	Country	Class	Time	Notes
1	Oxana Boturchuk	Ukraine	T12	57.30	Q, SB
2	Maria Gomes Da Silva; Guide: Albano Pedro Zongo	Angola	T11	1:01.78	q, PB
3	Hanah Ngendo Mwangi	Kenya	T12	DQ	
4	Jerusa Geber Santos; Guide: Luiz Henrique Barboza Da Silva	Brazil	T11	DQ	

==== Heat 3 ====
Rank	Athlete	Country	Class	Time	Notes
1	Elisabetta Stefanini; Guide: Massimo di Marcello	Italy	T12	1:02.57	Q
2	Miroslava Sedlackova; Guide: Michal Prochazka	Czech Republic	T11	1:03.34	q
3	Casandra G. Cruz Monroy; Guide: Jovan Blancas Garcia	Mexico	T11	1:05.10	PB
4	Katherina Taylor; Guide: Hugo Lombardo	Panama	T11	1:14.76	SB

==== Heat 4 ====
Rank	Athlete	Country	Class	Time	Notes
1	Zhu Daqing; Guide: Zhang Hui	China	T12	59.58	Q, SB
2	Terezinha Guilhermina; Guide: Guilherme Soares de Santana	Brazil	T11	1:00.01	q
3	Esperança Gicaso; Guide: Marcio Jose Fonseca Neto	Angola	T11	1:07.57	PB

=== Semifinals ===
Competed 3 September 2012 from 11:03. Qual. rule: winner of each heat (Q) plus the two fastest other times (q) qualified.

==== Heat 1 ====
Rank	Athlete	Country	Class	Time	Notes
1	Oxana Boturchuk	Ukraine	T12	55.93	Q, PB
2	Terezinha Guilhermina; Guide: Guilherme Soares de Santana	Brazil	T11	58.41	q
3	Maria Gomes Da Silva; Guide: Albano Pedro Zongo	Angola	T11	1:02.20	
4	Zhu Daqing; Guide: Zhang Hui	China	T12	DQ	

==== Heat 2 ====
Rank	Athlete	Country	Class	Time	Notes
1	Assia El Hannouni	France	T12	55.50	Q
2	Daniela Velasco; Guide: Jose Guadalupe Fuentes Ortiz	Mexico	T12	58.86	q
3	Elisabetta Stefanini; Guide: Massimo di Marcello	Italy	T12	1:02.03	
4	Miroslava Sedlackova; Guide: Michal Prochazka	Czech Republic	T11	1:02.18	PB

=== Final ===
Competed 4 September 2012 at 21:15.

Rank	Athlete	Country	Class	Time	Notes
1st place, gold medalist(s)	Assia El Hannouni	France	T12	55.39	
2nd place, silver medalist(s)	Oxana Boturchuk	Ukraine	T12	55.69	PB
3rd place, bronze medalist(s)	Daniela Velasco; Guide: Jose Guadalupe Fuentes Ortiz	Mexico	T12	58.51	
4	Terezinha Guilhermina; Guide: Guilherme Soares de Santana	Brazil	T11	1:39.73	

Q = qualified by place. q = qualified by time. PB = Personal Best. SB = Seasonal Best.
