= Athletics at the 2012 Summer Paralympics – Women's 200 metres T11 =

Women's 200 metres T11 at the XIV Paralympic Games
- Venue: London Olympic Stadium
- Dates: 1 to 2 September
- Competitors: 13 from 10 nations
- Winning time: 24.82

Medalists
1st place, gold medalist(s)		Terezinha Guilhermina; Guilherme Soares de Santana	Brazil
2nd place, silver medalist(s)		Jerusa Geber Santos; Luiz Henrique Barboza Da Silva	Brazil
3rd place, bronze medalist(s)		Jia Juntingxian; Xu Donglin	China

Athletics at the 2012 Summer Paralympics
Classification
T/F11–13: Blind and visually impaired
T/F20: Intellectual disability
T/F31–38: Cerebral palsy
F40: Les Autres
T/F42–46: Amputees
T/F51–58: Spinal cord disability
Men T/F11–13
Track
100 m	T11	T12	T13
200 m	T11	T12	T13
400 m	T11	T12	T13
800 m		T12	T13
1500 m	T11		T13
5000 m	T11	T12
4×100 m relay	T11–13
Road
Marathon		T12
Field
Long jump	F11		F13
Triple jump	F11	F12
Shot put	F11–12
Discus throw	F11
Javelin throw		F12–13
Women T/F11–13
Track
100 m	T11	T12	T13
200 m	T11	T12
400 m		T12	T13
1500 m		T12
Field
Long jump	F11–12		F13
Shot put	F11–12
Discus throw	F11–12
Javelin throw		F12–13

The Women's 200 metres T11 event at the 2012 Summer Paralympics took place at the London Olympic Stadium from 1 to 2 September. The event consisted of 4 heats, 2 semifinals and a final.

The T11 category is for athletes with a visual impairment. A T11 athlete may be entirely without sight, or be able to perceive light, but have no ability to see the shape of a hand at any distance. T11 athletes commonly run with guides.

== Records ==
Prior to the competition, the existing World and Paralympic records were as follows:

World record	Terezinha Guilhermina (BRA)	24.67	20 April 2012	Mexico City, Mexico
Paralympic record	Adria Santos (BRA)	24.99	27 October 2000	Sydney, Australia
Broken records during the 2012 Summer Paralympics
Paralympic record	Terezinha Guilhermina (BRA)	24.89	2 September 2012	
Paralympic record	Terezinha Guilhermina (BRA)	24.82	2 September 2012	

== Results ==
=== Round 1 ===
Competed 1 September 2012 from 10:53. Qual. rule: winner of each heat (Q) plus the 4 fastest other times (q) qualified.

==== Heat 1 ====
Rank	Athlete	Country	Time	Notes
1	Terezinha Guilhermina; Guide: Guilherme Soares de Santana	Brazil	24.89	Q, PR
2	Maria Gomes Da Silva; Guide: Albano Pedro Zongo	Angola	27.60	q, RR
3	Paraskevi Kantza; Guide: Theodoros Katsonopoulos	Greece	28.10	q, PB
			Wind: +0.2 m/s	

==== Heat 2 ====
Rank	Athlete	Country	Time	Notes
1	Jerusa Geber Santos; Guide: Luiz Henrique Barboza Da Silva	Brazil	26.96	Q
2	Esperança Gicaso; Guide: Marcio Jose Fonseca Neto	Angola	28.45	PB
3	Miroslava Sedlackova; Guide: Michal Prochazka	Czech Republic	28.57	PB
			Wind: -0.2 m/s	

==== Heat 3 ====
Rank	Athlete	Country	Time	Notes
1	Jhulia Santos; Guide: Fabio Dias de Oliveira Silva	Brazil	27.01	Q, PB
2	Yuki Temma; Guide: Katsuyuki Kondo	Japan	28.30	
3	Katherina Taylor; Guide: Hugo Lombardo	Panama	32.76	SB
4	Vanessa Benavidez Hernandez; Guide: Gema Alvarado Estrada	Nicaragua	33.51	SB
			Wind: +0.5 m/s	

==== Heat 4 ====
Rank	Athlete	Country	Time	Notes
1	Jia Juntingxian; Guide: Xu Donglin	China	26.28	Q, PB
2	Casandra G. Cruz Monroy; Guide: Jovan Blancas Garcia	Mexico	27.11	q, PB
3	Tracey Hinton; Guide: Steffan Hughes	Great Britain	27.26	q, SB
			Wind: +1.2 m/s	

=== Semifinals ===
Competed 2 September 2012 from 10:00. Qual. rule: winner of each heat (Q) plus the two fastest other times (q) qualified.

==== Heat 1 ====
Rank	Athlete	Country	Time	Notes
1	Terezinha Guilhermina; Guide: Guilherme Soares de Santana	Brazil	24.92	Q
2	Jhulia Santos; Guide: Fabio Dias de Oliveira Silva	Brazil	26.70	q, PB
3	Casandra G. Cruz Monroy; Guide: Jovan Blancas Garcia	Mexico	26.96	PB
4	Paraskevi Kantza; Guide: Theodoros Katsonopoulos	Greece	27.57	PB
			Wind: +0.1 m/s	

==== Heat 2 ====
Rank	Athlete	Country	Time	Notes
1	Jia Juntingxian; Guide: Xu Donglin	China	26.25	Q, PB
2	Jerusa Geber Santos; Guide: Luiz Henrique Barboza Da Silva	Brazil	26.64	q
3	Tracey Hinton; Guide: Steffan Hughes	Great Britain	27.38	
4	Maria Gomes Da Silva; Guide: Albano Pedro Zongo	Angola	27.71	
			Wind: +0.2 m/s	

=== Final ===
Competed 2 September 2012 at 19:24.

Rank	Athlete	Country	Time	Notes
1st place, gold medalist(s)	Terezinha Guilhermina; Guide: Guilherme Soares de Santana	Brazil	24.82	PR
2nd place, silver medalist(s)	Jerusa Geber Santos; Guide: Luiz Henrique Barboza Da Silva	Brazil	26.32	
3rd place, bronze medalist(s)	Jia Juntingxian; Guide: Xu Donglin	China	26.33	
4	Jhulia Santos; Guide: Fabio Dias de Oliveira Silva	Brazil	26.65	PB
			Wind: +0.4 m/s	

Q = qualified by place. q = qualified by time. PR = Paralympic Record. RR = Regional Record. PB = Personal Best. SB = Seasonal Best.
