= Athletics at the 2012 Summer Paralympics – Men's 200 metres T12 =

Men's 200 metres T12 at the XIV Paralympic Games
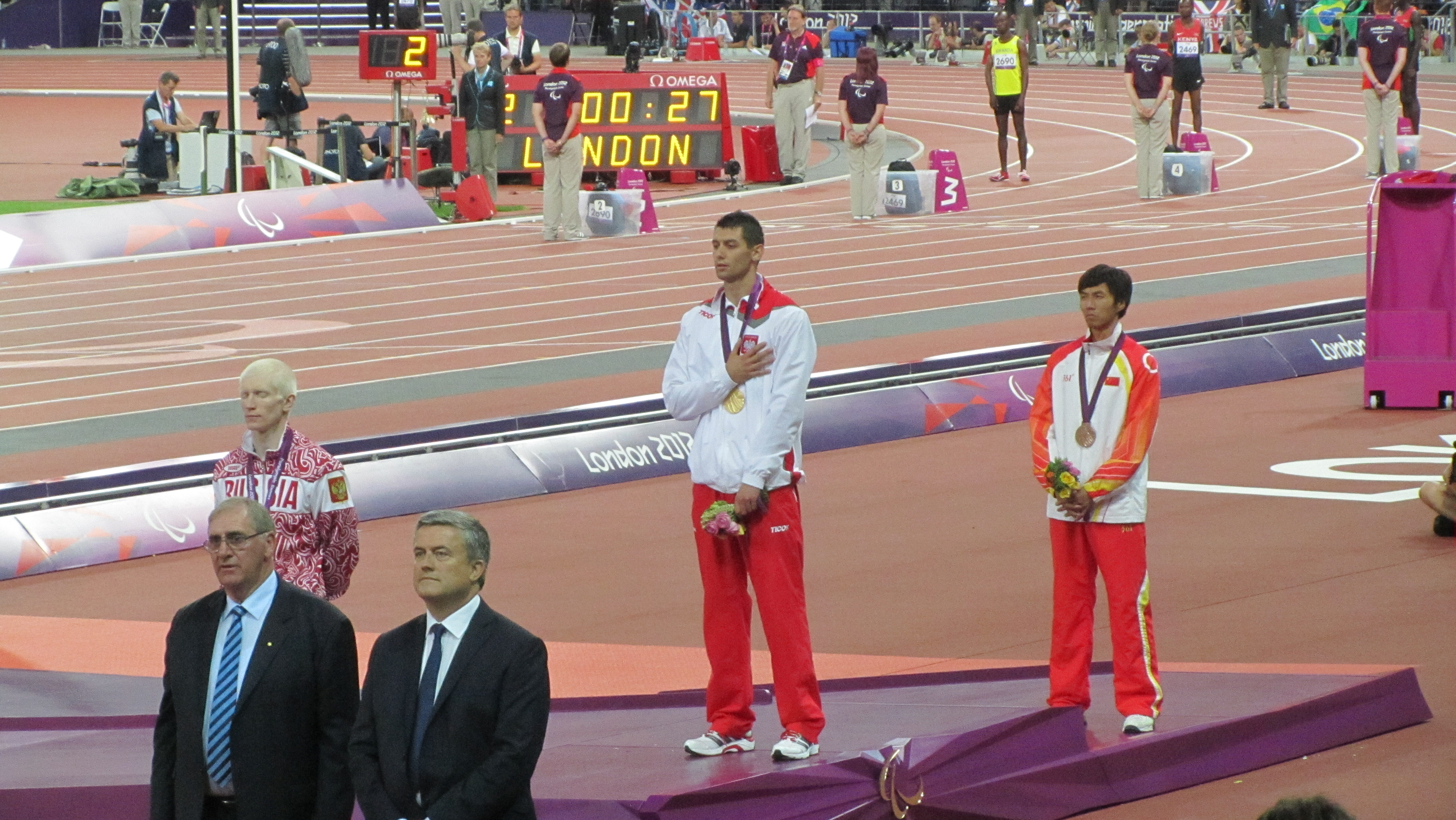
- Left-right: Trikolich, Michalski, Li
- Venue: London Olympic Stadium
- Dates: 7 and 8 September
- Competitors: 20 from 16 nations
- Winning time: 21.56

Medalists
1st place, gold medalist(s)		Mateusz Michalski	Poland
2nd place, silver medalist(s)		Fedor Trikolich	Russia
3rd place, bronze medalist(s)		Li Yansong	China

Athletics at the 2012 Summer Paralympics
Classification
T/F11–13: Blind and visually impaired
T/F20: Intellectual disability
T/F31–38: Cerebral palsy
F40: Les Autres
T/F42–46: Amputees
T/F51–58: Spinal cord disability
Men T/F11–13
Track
100 m	T11	T12	T13
200 m	T11	T12	T13
400 m	T11	T12	T13
800 m		T12	T13
1500 m	T11		T13
5000 m	T11	T12
4×100 m relay	T11–13
Road
Marathon		T12
Field
Long jump	F11		F13
Triple jump	F11	F12
Shot put	F11–12
Discus throw	F11
Javelin throw		F12–13
Women T/F11–13
Track
100 m	T11	T12	T13
200 m	T11	T12
400 m		T12	T13
1500 m		T12
Field
Long jump	F11–12		F13
Shot put	F11–12
Discus throw	F11–12
Javelin throw		F12–13

The Men's 200 metres T12 event at the 2012 Summer Paralympics took place at the London Olympic Stadium on 7 and 8 September.

The T12 category is for athletes with visual impairment. Athletes in this category will generally have some residual sight, the ability to recognise the shape of a hand at a distance of 2 metres and the ability to perceive clearly will be no more than 2/60. T12 athletes commonly run with guides.

== Records ==
Prior to the competition, the existing World and Paralympic records were as follows:

World & Paralympic record	Adekunle Adesoji (NGR)	21.77	24 September 2004	Athens, Greece
Broken records during the 2012 Summer Paralympics
World record	Mateusz Michalski (POL)	21.56	8 September 2012	

== Results ==
=== Round 1 ===
Competed 7 September 2012 from 11:05. Qual. rule: winner of each heat (Q) plus the 7 fastest other times (q) qualified.

==== Heat 1 ====
Rank	Athlete	Country	Time	Notes
1	Thomas Ulbricht	Germany	22.56	Q, =PB
2	Mahmoud Khaldi	Tunisia	22.63	q, PB
3	Maximiliano Rodriguez	Spain	22.87	q, PB
4	Thierb Siqueira; Guide: Roger Pereira Manarin	Brazil	23.60	SB
			Wind: -0.2 m/s	

==== Heat 2 ====
Rank	Athlete	Country	Time	Notes
1	Hilton Langenhoven	South Africa	22.44	Q, SB
2	Josiah Jamison; Guide: Jerome Avery	United States	22.52	q, PB
3	Gabriel Potra; Guide: Ricardo Pacheco	Portugal	23.64	SB
4	Hyacinthe Deleplace; Guide: Edgar Onezou	France	DQ	
			Wind: -0.2 m/s	

==== Heat 3 ====
Rank	Athlete	Country	Time	Notes
1	Mateusz Michalski	Poland	22.13	Q, SB
2	Fedor Trikolich	Russia	22.47	q, PB
3	Ahmed Abdul Amir Kadhim	Iraq	23.16	PB
4	Gerard Desgarrega Puigdevall; Guide: Alejandro Guerrero Diaz	Spain	23.19	PB
			Wind: +1.3 m/s	

==== Heat 4 ====
Rank	Athlete	Country	Time	Notes
1	Yang Yuqing	China	22.41	Q, PB
2	Jorge B. Gonzalez Sauceda	Mexico	22.96	PB
3	Matthias Schroeder; Guide: Tobias Schneider	Germany	23.32	
4	Brandon King; Guide: Andrew Heffernan	Canada	24.29	SB
			Wind: +0.1 m/s	

==== Heat 5 ====
Rank	Athlete	Country	Time	Notes
1	Li Yansong	China	22.40	Q, PB
2	Yuan Yizhi	China	22.48	q, PB
3	Rza Osmanov	Azerbaijan	22.85	q, SB
4	Henry Nzungi Mwendo	Kenya	22.88	q, SB
			Wind: -0.1 m/s	

=== Semifinals ===
Competed 7 September 2012 from 19:00. Qual. rule: winner of each heat (Q) plus best second place (q) qualified.

==== Heat 1 ====
Rank	Athlete	Country	Time	Notes
1	Hilton Langenhoven	South Africa	22.24	Q, PB
2	Yang Yuqing	China	22.30	PB
3	Mahmoud Khaldi	Tunisia	22.88	
4	Rza Osmanov	Azerbaijan	23.11	
			Wind: +0.5 m/s	

==== Heat 2 ====
Rank	Athlete	Country	Time	Notes
1	Fedor Trikolich	Russia	21.94	Q, PB
2	Mateusz Michalski	Poland	22.09	q, SB
3	Yuan Yizhi	China	22.52	
4	Henry Nzungi Mwendo	Kenya	23.24	
			Wind: Nil	

==== Heat 3 ====
Rank	Athlete	Country	Time	Notes
1	Li Yansong	China	22.07	Q, RR
2	Maximiliano Rodriguez	Spain	23.18	
3	Thomas Ulbricht	Germany	23.49	
	Josiah Jamison; Guide: Jerome Avery	United States	DQ	
			Wind: Nil	

=== Final ===
Competed 8 September 2012 at 20:20.

Rank	Athlete	Country	Time	Notes
1st place, gold medalist(s)	Mateusz Michalski	Poland	21.56	WR
2nd place, silver medalist(s)	Fedor Trikolich	Russia	21.81	PB
3rd place, bronze medalist(s)	Li Yansong	China	22.04	RR
4	Hilton Langenhoven	South Africa	22.29	
			Wind: +1.0 m/s	

Q = qualified by place. q = qualified by time. WR = World Record. RR = Regional Record. PB = Personal Best. SB = Seasonal Best. DQ = Disqualified.
