= Athletics at the 2012 Summer Paralympics – Men's 100 metres T12 =

Men's 100 metres T12 at the XIV Paralympic Games
- Venue: London Olympic Stadium
- Dates: 3 and 4 September
- Competitors: 11 from 9 nations

Medalists
| 1st place, gold medalist(s) | | Fedor Trikolich | Russia |
| 2nd place, silver medalist(s) | | Mateusz Michalski | Poland |
| 3rd place, bronze medalist(s) | | Li Yansong | China |

| Athletics at the 2012 Summer Paralympics |
Classification
T/F11–13: Blind and visually impaired
T/F20: Intellectual disability
T/F31–38: Cerebral palsy
F40: Les Autres
T/F42–46: Amputees
T/F51–58: Spinal cord disability
Men T/F11–13
Track
| 100 m | T11 | T12 | T13 |
| 200 m | T11 | T12 | T13 |
| 400 m | T11 | T12 | T13 |
| 800 m | | T12 | T13 |
| 1500 m | T11 | | T13 |
| 5000 m | T11 | T12 |
| 4×100 m relay | T11–13 |
Road
| Marathon | | T12 |
Field
| Long jump | F11 | | F13 |
| Triple jump | F11 | F12 |
| Shot put | F11–12 |
| Discus throw | F11 |
| Javelin throw | | F12–13 |
Women T/F11–13
Track
| 100 m | T11 | T12 | T13 |
| 200 m | T11 | T12 |
| 400 m | | T12 | T13 |
| 1500 m | | T12 |
Field
| Long jump | F11–12 | | F13 |
| Shot put | F11–12 |
| Discus throw | F11–12 |
| Javelin throw | | F12–13 |

The Men's 100 metres T12 event for the 2012 Summer Paralympics took place at the London Olympic Stadium on 3 and 4 September.

The T12 category is for athletes with visual impairment. Athletes in this category will generally have some residual sight, the ability to recognise the shape of a hand at a distance of 2 metres and the ability to perceive clearly will be no more than 2/60. T12 athletes commonly run with guides.

== Records ==
Prior to the competition, the existing World and Paralympic records were as follows.

| World record | Elchin Muradov (AZE) | 10.66 | Imola, Italy | 19 June 2010 |
| Paralympic record | Adekunle Adesoji (NGR) | 10.75 | Athens, Greece | 22 September 2004 |

== Results ==
=== Round 1 ===
Run 3 September 2012 from 11:41. Qual. rule: winner of each heat (Q) plus best second place (q) qualified.

==== Heat 1 ====
| Rank | Athlete | Country | Time | Notes |
|---|---|---|---|---|
| 1 | Fedor Trikolich | Russia | 10.91 | Q, PB |
| 2 | Maximiliano Rodriguez | Spain | 11.12 | q, SB |
| 3 | Yang Yuqing | China | 11.16 | RR |
| 4 | Gabriel Potra; Guide: Ricardo Pacheco | Portugal | 11.65 | |
| | | | Wind: -0.9 m/s | |

==== Heat 2 ====
| Rank | Athlete | Country | Time | Notes |
|---|---|---|---|---|
| 1 | Li Yansong | China | 10.96 | Q, RR |
| 2 | Thomas Ulbricht | Germany | 11.29 | |
| 3 | Ahmed Abdul Amir Kadhim | Iraq | 11.77 | SB |
| 4 | Josiah Jamison; Guide: Jerome Avery | United States | DQ | |
| | | | Wind: -0.3 m/s | |

==== Heat 3 ====
| Rank | Athlete | Country | Time | Notes |
|---|---|---|---|---|
| 1 | Mateusz Michalski | Poland | 11.01 | Q |
| 2 | Jorge B. Gonzalez Sauceda | Mexico | 11.60 | SB |
| 3 | Rodolfo Alves | Portugal | 11.91 | |
| | | | Wind: +0.8 m/s | |

=== Final ===
Run 4 September 2012 at 19:25.

| Rank | Athlete | Country | Time | Notes |
|---|---|---|---|---|
| 1st place, gold medalist(s) | Fedor Trikolich | Russia | 10.81 | PB |
| 2nd place, silver medalist(s) | Mateusz Michalski | Poland | 10.88 | |
| 3rd place, bronze medalist(s) | Li Yansong | China | 10.91 | RR |
| 4 | Maximiliano Rodriguez | Spain | 11.20 | |
| | | | Wind: +0.4 m/s | |

Q = qualified by place. q = qualified by time. RR = regional record. PB = personal best. SB = seasonal best. DQ = disqualified.
