= Athletics at the 2012 Summer Paralympics – Women's 100 metres T11 =

Women's 100 metres T11 at the XIV Paralympic Games
- Venue: London Olympic Stadium
- Dates: 4 and 5 September
- Competitors: 12 from 7 nations

Medalists
1st place, gold medalist(s)		Terezinha Guilhermina; Guilherme Soares de Santana	Brazil
2nd place, silver medalist(s)		Jerusa Geber Santos; Luiz Henrique Barboza Da Silva	Brazil
3rd place, bronze medalist(s)		Jhulia Santos; Fabio Dias de Oliveira Silva	Brazil

Athletics at the 2012 Summer Paralympics
Classification
T/F11–13: Blind and visually impaired
T/F20: Intellectual disability
T/F31–38: Cerebral palsy
F40: Les Autres
T/F42–46: Amputees
T/F51–58: Spinal cord disability
Men T/F11–13
Track
100 m	T11	T12	T13
200 m	T11	T12	T13
400 m	T11	T12	T13
800 m		T12	T13
1500 m	T11		T13
5000 m	T11	T12
4×100 m relay	T11–13
Road
Marathon		T12
Field
Long jump	F11		F13
Triple jump	F11	F12
Shot put	F11–12
Discus throw	F11
Javelin throw		F12–13
Women T/F11–13
Track
100 m	T11	T12	T13
200 m	T11	T12
400 m		T12	T13
1500 m		T12
Field
Long jump	F11–12		F13
Shot put	F11–12
Discus throw	F11–12
Javelin throw		F12–13

The Women's 100 metres T11 event at the 2012 Summer Paralympics took place at the London Olympic Stadium on 4 and 5 September.

The T11 category is for athletes with a visual impairment. A T11 athlete may be entirely without sight, or be able to perceive light, but have no ability to see the shape of a hand at any distance. T11 athletes commonly run with guides.

== Records ==
Broken records during the 2012 Summer Paralympics
Paralympic record	Terezinha Guilhermina (BRA)	12.23	London, United Kingdom	4 September 2012
World record	Terezinha Guilhermina (BRA)	12.01	London, United Kingdom	5 September 2012

== Results ==
=== Round 1 ===
Competed 4 September 2012 from 11:10. Qual. rule: winner of each heat (Q) plus best second place (q) qualified.

==== Heat 1 ====
Rank	Athlete	Country	Time	Notes
1	Jerusa Geber Santos; Guide: Luiz Henrique Barboza Da Silva	Brazil	12.68	Q
2	Jia Juntingxian; Guide: Xu Donglin	China	12.87	q, PB
3	Yuki Temma; Guide: Katsuyuki Kondo	Japan	13.57	=PB
4	Gabriela Gonzalez Santa Cruz; Guide: Gabriel Mezquitan Galicia	Mexico	14.53	
			Wind: -0.1 m/s	

==== Heat 2 ====
Rank	Athlete	Country	Time	Notes
1	Terezinha Guilhermina; Guide: Guilherme Soares de Santana	Brazil	12.23	Q, PR
2	Esperança Gicaso; Guide: Marcio Jose Fonseca Neto	Angola	12.98	RR
3	Tracey Hinton; Guide: Steffan Hughes	Great Britain	13.43	SB
4	Vanessa Benavidez Hernandez; Guide: Gema Alvarado Estrada	Nicaragua	16.07	SB
			Wind: +0.2 m/s	

==== Heat 3 ====
Rank	Athlete	Country	Time	Notes
1	Jhulia Santos; Guide: Fabio Dias de Oliveira Silva	Brazil	12.88	Q, PB
2	Tania Lorena Jimenez Manzanarez; Guide: Joe Ericker Campos Collazo	Mexico	13.38	PB
3	Maria Gomes Da Silva; Guide: Albano Pedro Zongo	Angola	13.57	PB
4	Shiho Watanabe; Guide: Koki Shimoinaba	Japan	14.17	PB
			Wind: +0.3 m/s	

=== Final ===
Competed 5 September 2012 at 20:27.

Rank	Athlete	Country	Time	Notes
1st place, gold medalist(s)	Terezinha Guilhermina; Guide: Guilherme Soares de Santana	Brazil	12.01	WR
2nd place, silver medalist(s)	Jerusa Geber Santos; Guide: Luiz Henrique Barboza Da Silva	Brazil	12.75	
3rd place, bronze medalist(s)	Jhulia Santos; Guide: Fabio Dias de Oliveira Silva	Brazil	12.76	PB
4	Jia Juntingxian; Guide: Xu Donglin	China	12.79	PB
			Wind: +1.2 m/s	

Q = qualified by place. q = qualified by time. WR = World Record. PR = Paralympic Record. RR = Regional Record. PB = Personal Best. SB = Seasonal Best.
