= Athletics at the 2012 Summer Paralympics – Men's 400 metres T13 =

Men's 400 metres T13 at the XIV Paralympic Games
- Venue: London Olympic Stadium
- Dates: 31 August to 2 September
- Competitors: 12 from 10 nations
- Winning time: 48.59

Medalists
1st place, gold medalist(s)		Alexey Labzin	Russia
2nd place, silver medalist(s)		Alexander Zverev	Russia
3rd place, bronze medalist(s)		Mohamed Amguoun	Morocco

Athletics at the 2012 Summer Paralympics
Classification
T/F11–13: Blind and visually impaired
T/F20: Intellectual disability
T/F31–38: Cerebral palsy
F40: Les Autres
T/F42–46: Amputees
T/F51–58: Spinal cord disability
Men T/F11–13
Track
100 m	T11	T12	T13
200 m	T11	T12	T13
400 m	T11	T12	T13
800 m		T12	T13
1500 m	T11		T13
5000 m	T11	T12
4×100 m relay	T11–13
Road
Marathon		T12
Field
Long jump	F11		F13
Triple jump	F11	F12
Shot put	F11–12
Discus throw	F11
Javelin throw		F12–13
Women T/F11–13
Track
100 m	T11	T12	T13
200 m	T11	T12
400 m		T12	T13
1500 m		T12
Field
Long jump	F11–12		F13
Shot put	F11–12
Discus throw	F11–12
Javelin throw		F12–13

The Men's 400 metres T13 event at the 2012 Summer Paralympics took place at the London Olympic Stadium from 31 August to 2 September.

The T13 category is for athletes with a moderate visual impairment. Athletes in this category have a variety of visual impairments, but can typically recognize contours from a distance of 2 to 6 metres. Athletes in this category do not typically require a guide.

== Records ==
Prior to the competition, the existing World and Paralympic records were as follows:

World record	Adekunle Adesoji (NGR)	47.88	1 January 1999	Johannesburg, South Africa
Paralympic record	Luis Manuel Galano (CUB)	49.12	10 September 2008	Beijing, China
Broken records during the 2012 Summer Paralympics
Paralympic record	Mohamed Amguoun (MAR)	49.04	31 August 2012	
Paralympic record	Alexey Labzin (RUS)	48.59	2 September 2012	

== Results ==
=== Round 1 ===
Competed 31 August 2012 from 10:55. Qual. rule: first 3 in each heat (Q) plus the 2 fastest other times (q) qualified.

==== Heat 1 ====
Rank	Athlete	Country	Time	Notes
1	Hussein Kadhim	Iraq	50.36	Q, RR
2	Ioannis Protos	Greece	50.73	Q
3	Alexey Labzin	Russia	51.48	Q, PB
4	Zine Eddine Sekhri	Algeria	51.92	q
5	Andre Andrade	Brazil	54.90	
6	Miguel Bartelemy Sablon	Cuba	DQ	

==== Heat 2 ====
Rank	Athlete	Country	Time	Notes
1	Mohamed Amguoun	Morocco	49.04	Q, PR
2	Alexander Zverev	Russia	49.80	Q
3	Djamil Nasser	Algeria	50.45	Q, PB
4	Markeith Price	United States	51.11	q, PB
5	Hugo Cavaco	Portugal	53.10	
6	Islam Salimov	Kazakhstan	54.14	PB

=== Final ===
Competed 2 September 2012 at 20:41.

Rank	Athlete	Country	Time	Notes
1st place, gold medalist(s)	Alexey Labzin	Russia	48.59	PR
2nd place, silver medalist(s)	Alexander Zverev	Russia	48.83	PB
3rd place, bronze medalist(s)	Mohamed Amguoun	Morocco	49.45	
4	Ioannis Protos	Greece	49.67	SB
5	Hussein Kadhim	Iraq	49.76	RR
6	Djamil Nasser	Algeria	49.88	PB
7	Zine Eddine Sekhri	Algeria	51.16	PB
8	Markeith Price	United States	51.98	

Q = qualified by place. q = qualified by time. PR = Paralympic Record. RR = Regional Record. PB = Personal Best.
