= Athletics at the 2012 Summer Paralympics – Men's 100 metres T11 =

Men's 100 metres T11 at the XIV Paralympic Games
- Venue: London Olympic Stadium
- Dates: 7 and 8 September
- Competitors: 18 from 12 nations

Medalists
1st place, gold medalist(s)		Xue Lei; Wang Lin	China
2nd place, silver medalist(s)		Lucas Prado; Justino Barbosa dos Santos	Brazil
3rd place, bronze medalist(s)		Felipe Gomes; Leonardo Souza Lopes	Brazil

Athletics at the 2012 Summer Paralympics
Classification
T/F11–13: Blind and visually impaired
T/F20: Intellectual disability
T/F31–38: Cerebral palsy
F40: Les Autres
T/F42–46: Amputees
T/F51–58: Spinal cord disability
Men T/F11–13
Track
100 m	T11	T12	T13
200 m	T11	T12	T13
400 m	T11	T12	T13
800 m		T12	T13
1500 m	T11		T13
5000 m	T11	T12
4×100 m relay	T11–13
Road
Marathon		T12
Field
Long jump	F11		F13
Triple jump	F11	F12
Shot put	F11–12
Discus throw	F11
Javelin throw		F12–13
Women T/F11–13
Track
100 m	T11	T12	T13
200 m	T11	T12
400 m		T12	T13
1500 m		T12
Field
Long jump	F11–12		F13
Shot put	F11–12
Discus throw	F11–12
Javelin throw		F12–13

The Men's 100 metres T11 event for the 2012 Summer Paralympics took place at the London Olympic Stadium on 7 and 8 September.

The T11 category is for athletes with a visual impairment. A T11 athlete may be entirely without sight, or be able to perceive light, but have no ability to see the shape of a hand at any distance. T11 athletes commonly run with guides.

== Records ==
Prior to the competition, the existing World and Paralympic records were as follows.

World & Paralympic record	Lucas Prado (BRA)	11.03	Beijing, China	9 September 2008

== Results ==
=== Round 1 ===
7 September 2012, 12:13. Qual. rule: winner of each heat (Q) plus the 7 fastest other times (q) qualified.

==== Heat 1 ====
Rank	Athlete	Country	Time	Notes
1	Xue Lei; Guide: Wang Lin	China	11.29	Q, RR
2	Xavier Porras; Guide: Enric Martin Panades	Spain	11.80	q, PB
3	Olusegun Francis Rotawo; Guide: Taiwo Olaleye	Nigeria	DQ	
4	Andrey Koptev; Guide: Sergey Petrichenko	Russia	DNS	
			Wind: -0.3 m/s	

==== Heat 2 ====
Rank	Athlete	Country	Time	Notes
1	Jose Sayovo Armando	Angola	11.33	Q, RR
2	Lucas Prado; Guide: Justino Barbosa dos Santos	Brazil	11.43	q
3	Firmino Baptista; Guide: Ivo Vital	Portugal	11.75	q
			Wind: -1.0 m/s	

==== Heat 3 ====
Rank	Athlete	Country	Time	Notes
1	Shang Baolong; Guide: Shi Yang	China	11.36	Q, PB
2	David Brown; Guide: Rolland Slade	United States	11.37	q, =PB
3	Ananias Shikongo; Guide: Even Tjiviju	Namibia	11.55	q, PB
			Wind: -0.7 m/s	

==== Heat 4 ====
Rank	Athlete	Country	Time	Notes
1	Daniel Silva; Guide: Heitor de Oliveira Sales	Brazil	11.43	Q, PB
2	Kitsana Jorchuy; Guide: Patchai Srikhamphan	Thailand	11.78	q, PB
3	Elexis Gillette; Guide: Wesley Williams	United States	11.85	
4	Bikram Bahadur Rana; Guide: Lila Kumar Shrestha	Nepal	12.81	SB
			Wind: +0.6 m/s	

==== Heat 5 ====
Rank	Athlete	Country	Time	Notes
1	Felipe Gomes; Guide: Leonardo Souza Lopes	Brazil	11.32	Q, SB
2	Octavio Angelo Dos Santos	Angola	11.70	q, PB
3	Martin Parejo Maza; Guide: Joan Borrisser Roldan	Spain	12.01	PB
4	Elchin Muradov; Guide: Pavel Setin	Azerbaijan	49.78	
			Wind: -0.2 m/s	

=== Semifinals ===
8 September 2012, 12:15. Qual. rule: winner of each heat (Q) plus best second place (q) qualified.

==== Heat 1 ====
Rank	Athlete	Country	Time	Notes
1	Lucas Prado; Guide: Justino Barbosa dos Santos	Brazil	11.15	Q, =PB
2	Xue Lei; Guide: Wang Lin	China	11.16	q, RR
3	David Brown; Guide: Rolland Slade	United States	11.29	PB
4	Xavier Porras; Guide: Enric Martin Panades	Spain	11.79	PB
			Wind: +0.4 m/s	

==== Heat 2 ====
Rank	Athlete	Country	Time	Notes
1	Jose Sayovo Armando	Angola	11.32	Q, RR
2	Firmino Baptista; Guide: Ivo Vital	Portugal	11.65	PB
3	Kitsana Jorchuy; Guide: Patchai Srikhamphan	Thailand	11.75	PB
4	Daniel Silva; Guide: Heitor de Oliveira Sales	Brazil	DNS	
			Wind: +0.5 m/s	

==== Heat 3 ====
Rank	Athlete	Country	Time	Notes
1	Felipe Gomes; Guide: Leonardo Souza Lopes	Brazil	11.20	Q, PB
2	Shang Baolong; Guide: Shi Yang	China	11.24	PB
3	Ananias Shikongo; Guide: Even Tjiviju	Namibia	11.49	PB
4	Octavio Angelo Dos Santos	Angola	11.59	PB
			Wind: +0.5 m/s	

=== Final ===
Rank	Athlete	Country	Time	Notes
1st place, gold medalist(s)	Xue Lei; Guide: Wang Lin	China	11.17	
2nd place, silver medalist(s)	Lucas Prado; Guide: Justino Barbosa dos Santos	Brazil	11.25	
3rd place, bronze medalist(s)	Felipe Gomes; Guide: Leonardo Souza Lopes	Brazil	11.27	
4	Jose Sayovo Armando	Angola	11.36	
			Wind: -0.3 m/s	

Q = qualified by place. q = qualified by time. RR = regional record. PB = personal best. SB = seasonal best. DQ = disqualified. DNS = did not start.
