= Athletics at the 2012 Summer Paralympics – Men's 5000 metres T11 =

Men's 5000 metres T11 at the XIV Paralympic Games
- Venue: London Olympic Stadium
- Dates: 7 September
- Competitors: 13 from 10 nations
- Winning time: 15:26.26

Medalists
1st place, gold medalist(s)		Cristian Valenzuela; Cristopher Guajardo	Chile
2nd place, silver medalist(s)		Jason Joseph Dunkerley; Josh Karanja	Canada
3rd place, bronze medalist(s)		Shinya Wada	Japan

Athletics at the 2012 Summer Paralympics
Classification
T/F11–13: Blind and visually impaired
T/F20: Intellectual disability
T/F31–38: Cerebral palsy
F40: Les Autres
T/F42–46: Amputees
T/F51–58: Spinal cord disability
Men T/F11–13
Track
100 m	T11	T12	T13
200 m	T11	T12	T13
400 m	T11	T12	T13
800 m		T12	T13
1500 m	T11		T13
5000 m	T11	T12
4×100 m relay	T11–13
Road
Marathon		T12
Field
Long jump	F11		F13
Triple jump	F11	F12
Shot put	F11–12
Discus throw	F11
Javelin throw		F12–13
Women T/F11–13
Track
100 m	T11	T12	T13
200 m	T11	T12
400 m		T12	T13
1500 m		T12
Field
Long jump	F11–12		F13
Shot put	F11–12
Discus throw	F11–12
Javelin throw		F12–13

The Men's 5000 metres T11 event at the 2012 Summer Paralympics took place at the London Olympic Stadium on 7 September.

The T11 category is for athletes with a visual impairment. A T11 athlete may be entirely without sight, or be able to perceive light, but have no ability to see the shape of a hand at any distance. T11 athletes commonly run with guides.

== Records ==
Prior to the competition, the existing World and Paralympic records were as follows:

World & Paralympic record	Henry Wanyoike (KEN)	15:11.07	24 September 2004	Athens, Greece

== Results ==
Competed 7 September 2012 at 19:55.

Rank	Athlete	Country	Time	Notes
1st place, gold medalist(s)	Cristian Valenzuela; Guide: Cristopher Guajardo	Chile	15:26.26	PB
2nd place, silver medalist(s)	Jason Joseph Dunkerley; Guide: Josh Karanja	Canada	15:34.07	PB
3rd place, bronze medalist(s)	Shinya Wada	Japan	15:55.26	RR
4	Francis Thuo Karanja; Guide: James Kuria Karanja	Kenya	15:56.67	PB
5	Nuno Alves	Portugal	16:06.28	SB
6	Jan Nehro; Guide: Duane Fortuin	South Africa	16:09.51	SB
7	Mikael Andersen; Guide: Laust Bengtsen	Denmark	16:11.47	PB
8	Luis Zapien Rosas; Guide: Juan Carlos Mariscal Rivera	Mexico	16:27.46	SB
9	Ricardo Vale; Guide: Paulo Ramos	Portugal	16:32.91	SB
10	Immanuel Kipkosgei Cheruiyot; Guide: Robert Tarus	Kenya	16:39.73	SB
11	Ricardo de Pedraza Losa; Guide: Oriol Sellares Martinez	Spain	16:42.11	
	Wilson Bii; Guide: Jacob Kener	Kenya	DNF	
	Odair Santos; Guide: Samuel Souza Do Nascimento	Brazil	DNS	

Q = qualified by place. q = qualified by time. RR = Regional Record. PB = Personal Best. SB = Seasonal Best. DNF = Did not finish. DNS = Did not start.
