= Athletics at the 2012 Summer Paralympics – Men's 800 metres T13 =

Men's 800 metres T13 at the XIV Paralympic Games
- Venue: London Olympic Stadium
- Dates: 7 to 8 September
- Competitors: 14 from 10 nations
- Winning time: 1:53.01

Medalists
| 1st place, gold medalist(s) | | Abdellatif Baka | Algeria |
| 2nd place, silver medalist(s) | | David Korir | Kenya |
| 3rd place, bronze medalist(s) | | Abdelillah Mame | Morocco |

| Athletics at the 2012 Summer Paralympics |
Classification
T/F11–13: Blind and visually impaired
T/F20: Intellectual disability
T/F31–38: Cerebral palsy
F40: Les Autres
T/F42–46: Amputees
T/F51–58: Spinal cord disability
Men T/F11–13
Track
| 100 m | T11 | T12 | T13 |
| 200 m | T11 | T12 | T13 |
| 400 m | T11 | T12 | T13 |
| 800 m | | T12 | T13 |
| 1500 m | T11 | | T13 |
| 5000 m | T11 | T12 |
| 4×100 m relay | T11–13 |
Road
| Marathon | | T12 |
Field
| Long jump | F11 | | F13 |
| Triple jump | F11 | F12 |
| Shot put | F11–12 |
| Discus throw | F11 |
| Javelin throw | | F12–13 |
Women T/F11–13
Track
| 100 m | T11 | T12 | T13 |
| 200 m | T11 | T12 |
| 400 m | | T12 | T13 |
| 1500 m | | T12 |
Field
| Long jump | F11–12 | | F13 |
| Shot put | F11–12 |
| Discus throw | F11–12 |
| Javelin throw | | F12–13 |

The Men's 800 metres T13 event at the 2012 Summer Paralympics took place at the London Olympic Stadium from 7 to 8 September.

The T13 category is for athletes with a moderate visual impairment. Athletes in this category have a variety of visual impairments, but can typically recognize contours from a distance of 2 to 6 metres. Athletes in this category do not typically require a guide.

== Records ==
Prior to the competition, the existing World and Paralympic records were as follows:

| World record | Lazaro Rashid Aquilar (CUB) | 1:52.50 | 19 August 2007 | Rio de Janeiro, Brazil |
| Paralympic record | Abdelillah Mame (MAR) | 1:54.78 | 15 September 2008 | Beijing, China |
Broken records during the 2012 Summer Paralympics
| Paralympic record | David Korir (KEN) | 1:54.56 | 7 September 2012 | |
| Paralympic record | Abdellatif Baka (ALG) | 1:53.01 | 8 September 2012 | |

== Results ==
=== Round 1 ===
Competed 7 September 2012 from 13:05. Qual. rule: first 3 in each heat (Q) plus the 2 fastest other times (q) qualified.

==== Heat 1 ====
| Rank | Athlete | Country | Time | Notes |
|---|---|---|---|---|
| 1 | Abdelillah Mame | Morocco | 1:58.00 | Q |
| 2 | Zine Eddine Sekhri | Algeria | 1:58.14 | Q, PB |
| 3 | Tim Prendergast | New Zealand | 1:58.21 | Q |
| 4 | Dmitrii Kornilov | Russia | 1:59.08 | SB |
| 5 | Miguel Bartelemy Sablon | Cuba | 2:02.11 | SB |
| 6 | Said Gomez | Panama | 2:10.57 | SB |
| 7 | Sam Harding | Australia | DNS | |

==== Heat 2 ====
| Rank | Athlete | Country | Time | Notes |
|---|---|---|---|---|
| 1 | David Korir | Kenya | 1:54.56 | Q, PR |
| 2 | Abdellatif Baka | Algeria | 1:54.79 | Q, PB |
| 3 | Łukasz Wietecki | Poland | 1:55.32 | Q, PB |
| 4 | Juan Carlos Arcos Lira | Mexico | 1:55.82 | q, PB |
| 5 | Alexey Akhtyamov | Russia | 1:55.86 | q, PB |
| 6 | Tarik Zalzouli | Morocco | 1:56.39 | PB |
| 7 | Abdelali El Kadioui El Idrissi | Morocco | 1:58.16 | SB |

=== Final ===
Competed 8 September 2012 at 11:55.

| Rank | Athlete | Country | Time | Notes |
|---|---|---|---|---|
| 1st place, gold medalist(s) | Abdellatif Baka | Algeria | 1:53.01 | PR |
| 2nd place, silver medalist(s) | David Korir | Kenya | 1:53.16 | PB |
| 3rd place, bronze medalist(s) | Abdelillah Mame | Morocco | 1:53.40 | PB |
| 4 | Łukasz Wietecki | Poland | 1:55.44 | |
| 5 | Tim Prendergast | New Zealand | 1:55.85 | PB |
| 6 | Alexey Akhtyamov | Russia | 1:57.33 | |
| 7 | Juan Carlos Arcos Lira | Mexico | 1:58.11 | |
| | Zine Eddine Sekhri | Algeria | DQ | |

Q = qualified by place. q = qualified by time. PR = Paralympic Record. PB = Personal Best. SB = Seasonal Best. DNS = Did not start.
