= Athletics at the 2012 Summer Paralympics – Men's 1500 metres T13 =

Men's 1500 metres T13 at the XIV Paralympic Games
- Venue: London Olympic Stadium
- Dates: 2 to 4 September
- Competitors: 22 from 14 nations
- Winning time: 3:48.31

Medalists
1st place, gold medalist(s)		Abderrahim Zhiou	Tunisia
2nd place, silver medalist(s)		David Korir	Kenya
3rd place, bronze medalist(s)		David Devine	Great Britain

Athletics at the 2012 Summer Paralympics
Classification
T/F11–13: Blind and visually impaired
T/F20: Intellectual disability
T/F31–38: Cerebral palsy
F40: Les Autres
T/F42–46: Amputees
T/F51–58: Spinal cord disability
Men T/F11–13
Track
100 m	T11	T12	T13
200 m	T11	T12	T13
400 m	T11	T12	T13
800 m		T12	T13
1500 m	T11		T13
5000 m	T11	T12
4×100 m relay	T11–13
Road
Marathon		T12
Field
Long jump	F11		F13
Triple jump	F11	F12
Shot put	F11–12
Discus throw	F11
Javelin throw		F12–13
Women T/F11–13
Track
100 m	T11	T12	T13
200 m	T11	T12
400 m		T12	T13
1500 m		T12
Field
Long jump	F11–12		F13
Shot put	F11–12
Discus throw	F11–12
Javelin throw		F12–13

The Men's 1500 metres T13 event at the 2012 Summer Paralympics took place at the London Olympic Stadium from 2 to 4 September.

The T13 category is for athletes with a moderate visual impairment. Athletes in this category have a variety of visual impairments, but can typically recognize contours from a distance of 2 to 6 metres. Athletes in this category do not typically require a guide.

== Records ==
Prior to the competition, the existing World and Paralympic records were as follows:

World record (T12)	Abel Ávila (ESP)	3:50.18	10 June 2006	Barcelona, Spain
Paralympic record (T12)	Maher Bouallegue (TUN)	3:51.09	21 September 2004	Athens, Greece
World record (T13)	Tim Prendergast (NZL)	3:51.82	16 July 2006	Ghent, Belgium
Paralympic record (T13)	Tim Prendergast (NZL)	3:56.03	21 September 2004	Athens, Greece
Broken records during the 2012 Summer Paralympics
Paralympic record (T13)	Alexey Akhtyamov (RUS)	3:55.46	2 September 2012	
Paralympic record (T13)	David Korir (KEN)	3:52.96	2 September 2012	
World record (T12)	Abderrahim Zhiou (TUN)	3:48.31	4 September 2012	
World record (T13)	David Korir (KEN)	3:48.84	4 September 2012	

== Results ==
=== Round 1 ===
Competed 2 September 2012 from 12:51. Qual. rule: first 4 in each heat (Q) plus the 4 fastest other times (q) qualified.

==== Heat 1 ====
Rank	Athlete	Country	Class	Time	Notes
1	El Amin Chentouf	Morocco	T12	3:52.77	Q, PB
2	Henry Kirwa	Kenya	T12	3:55.35	Q, PB
3	Abderrahim Zhiou	Tunisia	T12	3:55.43	Q, PB
4	Alexey Akhtyamov	Russia	T13	3:55.46	Q, PR
5	David Devine	Great Britain	T12	3:55.95	q, PB
6	Abdellatif Baka	Algeria	T13	3:58.72	PB
7	Semih Deniz	Turkey	T12	4:01.91	PB
8	Dmitrii Kornilov	Russia	T13	4:02.75	
9	Juan Carlos Arcos Lira	Mexico	T13	4:04.34	PB
10	Abel Ávila	Spain	T12	4:17.14	
11	Lassam Katongo	Zambia	T12	4:27.81	SB

==== Heat 2 ====
Rank	Athlete	Country	Class	Time	Notes
1	David Korir	Kenya	T13	3:52.96	Q, PR
2	Tarik Zalzouli	Morocco	T13	3:55.32	Q, PB
3	Lukasz Wietecki	Poland	T13	3:55.67	Q, PB
4	Egor Sharov	Russia	T12	3:55.70	Q, PB
5	Abdelillah Mame	Morocco	T13	3:56.01	q, PB
6	Tim Prendergast	New Zealand	T13	3:57.39	q, SB
7	Ignacio Ávila	Spain	T12	3:57.69	q, PB
8	Nacer-Eddine Karfas	Algeria	T12	4:08.35	
9	Lazaro Rashid	Cuba	T12	4:10.80	SB
10	Hatem Nasrallah	Tunisia	T12	4:13.27	
11	Said Gomez	Panama	T13	4:33.48	SB

=== Final ===
Competed 4 September 2012 at 19:16.

Rank	Athlete	Country	Class	Time	Notes
1st place, gold medalist(s)	Abderrahim Zhiou	Tunisia	T12	3:48.31	WR
2nd place, silver medalist(s)	David Korir	Kenya	T13	3:48.84	WR
3rd place, bronze medalist(s)	David Devine	Great Britain	T12	3:49.79	RR
4	Tarik Zalzouli	Morocco	T13	3:52.12	PB
5	Henry Kirwa	Kenya	T12	3:53.55	PB
6	Tim Prendergast	New Zealand	T13	3:53.60	PB
7	Lukasz Wietecki	Poland	T13	3:56.26	
8	Alexey Akhtyamov	Russia	T13	3:56.29	
9	Abdelillah Mame	Morocco	T13	3:56.29	
10	El Amin Chentouf	Morocco	T12	4:00.43	
11	Ignacio Ávila	Spain	T12	4:04.83	
12	Egor Sharov	Russia	T12	4:10.83	

Q = qualified by place. q = qualified by time. WR = World Record. PR = Paralympic Record. RR = Regional Record. PB = Personal Best. SB = Seasonal Best.
