= Athletics at the 2012 Summer Paralympics – Women's 100 metres T12 =

Event at the 2012 Summer Paralympics

Women's 100 metres T12 at the XIV Paralympic Games
- Venue: London Olympic Stadium
- Dates: 1 and 2 September
- Competitors: 17 from 13 nations
- Winning time: 12.05

Medalists
1st place, gold medalist(s)		Zhou Guohua; Li Jie	China
2nd place, silver medalist(s)		Libby Clegg; Mikail Huggins	Great Britain
3rd place, bronze medalist(s)		Oxana Boturchuk	Ukraine

Athletics at the 2012 Summer Paralympics
Classification
T/F11–13: Blind and visually impaired
T/F20: Intellectual disability
T/F31–38: Cerebral palsy
F40: Les Autres
T/F42–46: Amputees
T/F51–58: Spinal cord disability
Men T/F11–13
Track
100 m	T11	T12	T13
200 m	T11	T12	T13
400 m	T11	T12	T13
800 m		T12	T13
1500 m	T11		T13
5000 m	T11	T12
4×100 m relay	T11–13
Road
Marathon		T12
Field
Long jump	F11		F13
Triple jump	F11	F12
Shot put	F11–12
Discus throw	F11
Javelin throw		F12–13
Women T/F11–13
Track
100 m	T11	T12	T13
200 m	T11	T12
400 m		T12	T13
1500 m		T12
Field
Long jump	F11–12		F13
Shot put	F11–12
Discus throw	F11–12
Javelin throw		F12–13

The Women's 100 metres T12 event at the 2012 Summer Paralympics took place at the London Olympic Stadium on 1 and 2 September.

The T12 category is for athletes with visual impairment. Athletes in this category will generally have some residual sight, the ability to recognise the shape of a hand at a distance of 2 metres and the ability to perceive clearly will be no more than 2/60. T12 athletes commonly run with guides.

Broken records during the 2012 Summer Paralympics
World record	Oxana Boturchuk (UKR)	12.24	London, United Kingdom	1 September 2012
World record	Libby Clegg (GBR)	12.17	London, United Kingdom	1 September 2012
World record	Zhu Daqing (CHN)	12.13	London, United Kingdom	1 September 2012
World record	Zhou Guohua (CHN)	11.91	London, United Kingdom	1 September 2012

== Results ==
=== Round 1 ===
Competed 1 September 2012 from 10:15. Qual. rule: winner of each heat (Q) plus the 7 fastest other times (q) qualified.

==== Heat 1 ====
Rank	Athlete	Country	Time	Notes
1	Alice de Oliveira Correa; Guide: Diogo Cardoso da Silva	Brazil	12.81	Q, PB
2	Anna Kaniuk	Belarus	12.97	q
3	Hanah Ngendo Mwangi	Kenya	13.58	PB
4	Maria Muchavo	Mozambique	13.97	SB
			Wind: +1.7 m/s	

==== Heat 2 ====
Rank	Athlete	Country	Time	Notes
1	Oxana Boturchuk	Ukraine	12.24	Q, WR
2	Hana Kolníková; Guide: Jan Surgac	Slovakia	12.64	q, PB
3	Eva Ngui	Spain	13.32	
4	Liu Miaomiao	China	13.51	SB
			Wind: +0.6 m/s	

==== Heat 3 ====
Rank	Athlete	Country	Time	Notes
1	Libby Clegg; Guide: Mikail Huggins	Great Britain	12.17	Q, WR
2	Volha Zinkevich	Belarus	12.78	q, PB
3	Sara Martinez	Spain	13.27	PB
			Wind: +1.5 m/s	

==== Heat 4 ====
Rank	Athlete	Country	Time	Notes
1	Zhu Daqing; Guide: Zhang Hui	China	12.13	Q, WR
2	Assia El Hannouni; Guide: Gautier Simounet	France	12.52	q, PB
3	Miyassar Ibragimova	Uzbekistan	12.80	q, PB
			Wind: +0.3 m/s	

==== Heat 5 ====
Rank	Athlete	Country	Time	Notes
1	Zhou Guohua; Guide: Li Jie	China	11.91	Q, WR
2	Daineris Mijan	Cuba	12.79	q, PB
3	Elisabetta Stefanini; Guide: Massimo di Marcello	Italy	13.20	q
			Wind: +0.6 m/s	

=== Semifinals ===
Competed 1 September 2012 from 21:24. Qual. rule: winner of each heat (Q) plus best second place (q) qualified.

==== Heat 1 ====
Rank	Athlete	Country	Time	Notes
1	Zhou Guohua; Guide: Li Jie	China	12.11	Q
2	Assia El Hannouni; Guide: Gautier Simounet	France	12.34	PB
3	Hana Kolníková; Guide: Jan Surgac	Slovakia	12.77	
4	Elisabetta Stefanini; Guide: Massimo di Marcello	Italy	13.36	
			Wind: +0.5 m/s	

==== Heat 2 ====
Rank	Athlete	Country	Time	Notes
1	Zhu Daqing; Guide: Zhang Hui	China	12.52	Q
2	Volha Zinkevich	Belarus	12.85	
3	Miyassar Ibragimova	Uzbekistan	12.87	
4	Alice de Oliveira Correa; Guide: Diogo Cardoso da Silva	Brazil	13.02	
			Wind: -0.4 m/s	

==== Heat 3 ====
Rank	Athlete	Country	Time	Notes
1	Libby Clegg; Guide: Mikail Huggins	Great Britain	12.23	Q
2	Oxana Boturchuk	Ukraine	12.34	q
3	Daineris Mijan	Cuba	12.91	
4	Anna Kaniuk	Belarus	13.22	
			Wind: -0.4 m/s	

=== Final ===
Competed 2 September 2012 at 19:54.

Rank	Athlete	Country	Time	Notes
1st place, gold medalist(s)	Zhou Guohua; Guide: Li Jie	China	12.05	
2nd place, silver medalist(s)	Libby Clegg; Guide: Mikail Huggins	Great Britain	12.13	RR
3rd place, bronze medalist(s)	Oxana Boturchuk	Ukraine	12.18	PB
4	Zhu Daqing; Guide: Zhang Hui	China	12.20	
			Wind: +0.3 m/s	

Q = qualified by place. q = qualified by time. WR = World Record. RR = Regional Record. PB = Personal Best. SB = Seasonal Best.
