= Athletics at the 2012 Summer Paralympics – Men's 200 metres T11 =

Men's 200 metres T11 at the XIV Paralympic Games
- Venue: London Olympic Stadium
- Dates: 3 and 4 September
- Competitors: 18 from 13 nations
- Winning time: 22.97

Medalists
1st place, gold medalist(s)		Felipe Gomes; Leonardo Souza Lopes	Brazil
2nd place, silver medalist(s)		Daniel Silva; Heitor de Oliveira Sales	Brazil
3rd place, bronze medalist(s)		Jose Sayovo Armando; Nicolau Palanca	Angola

Athletics at the 2012 Summer Paralympics
Classification
T/F11–13: Blind and visually impaired
T/F20: Intellectual disability
T/F31–38: Cerebral palsy
F40: Les Autres
T/F42–46: Amputees
T/F51–58: Spinal cord disability
Men T/F11–13
Track
100 m	T11	T12	T13
200 m	T11	T12	T13
400 m	T11	T12	T13
800 m		T12	T13
1500 m	T11		T13
5000 m	T11	T12
4×100 m relay	T11–13
Road
Marathon		T12
Field
Long jump	F11		F13
Triple jump	F11	F12
Shot put	F11–12
Discus throw	F11
Javelin throw		F12–13
Women T/F11–13
Track
100 m	T11	T12	T13
200 m	T11	T12
400 m		T12	T13
1500 m		T12
Field
Long jump	F11–12		F13
Shot put	F11–12
Discus throw	F11–12
Javelin throw		F12–13

The Men's 200 metres T11 event at the 2012 Summer Paralympics took place at the London Olympic Stadium on 3 and 4 September.

The T11 category is for athletes with a visual impairment. A T11 athlete may be entirely without sight, or be able to perceive light, but have no ability to see the shape of a hand at any distance. T11 athletes commonly run with guides.

== Records ==
Prior to the competition, the existing World and Paralympic records were as follows:

World & Paralympic record	Lucas Prado (BRA)	22.48	13 September 2008	Beijing, China

== Results ==
=== Round 1 ===
Competed 3 September 2012 from 21:16. Qual. rule: winner of each heat (Q) plus the 7 fastest other times (q) qualified.

==== Heat 1 ====
Rank	Athlete	Country	Time	Notes
1	Elchin Muradov; Guide: Pavel Setin	Azerbaijan	23.49	Q, RR
2	Gauthier Tresor Makunda; Guide: Antoine Laneyrie	France	23.67	q, PB
3	Kitsana Jorchuy; Guide: Patchai Srikhamphan	Thailand	24.31	SB
4	Olusegun Francis Rotawo; Guide: Taiwo Olaleye	Nigeria	24.40	
			Wind: -0.1 m/s	

==== Heat 2 ====
Rank	Athlete	Country	Time	Notes
1	Shang Baolong; Guide: Shi Yang	China	23.43	Q, RR
2	David Brown; Guide: Rolland Slade	United States	23.54	q
3	Arian Iznaga; Guide: Yaseen Perez Gomez	Cuba	23.77	q, SB
4	Bikram Bahadur Rana	Nepal	26.95	PB
			Wind: Nil	

==== Heat 3 ====
Rank	Athlete	Country	Time	Notes
1	Lucas Prado; Guide: Justino Barbosa dos Santos	Brazil	22.96	Q, SB
2	Ananias Shikongo; Guide: Even Tjiviju	Namibia	23.02	q, PB
3	Xue Lei; Guide: Wang Lin	China	23.66	q
			Wind: -0.1 m/s	

==== Heat 4 ====
Rank	Athlete	Country	Time	Notes
1	Felipe Gomes; Guide: Leonardo Souza Lopes	Brazil	22.99	Q, PB
2	Jose Sayovo Armando; Guide: Nicolau Palanca	Angola	23.07	q, SB
3	Elexis Gillette; Guide: Wesley Williams	United States	25.42	SB
4	Pita Rondao Bulande; Guide: Fernando Lucas Macungo	Mozambique	26.68	SB
			Wind: -0.3 m/s	

==== Heat 5 ====
Rank	Athlete	Country	Time	Notes
1	Daniel Silva; Guide: Heitor de Oliveira Sales	Brazil	23.29	Q
2	Firmino Baptista; Guide: Ivo Vital	Portugal	24.00	q, PB
3	Octavio Angelo Dos Santos; Guide: Abel Pires Maquina Mariti	Angola	24.31	SB
			Wind: Nil	

=== Semifinals ===
Competed 4 September 2012 from 12:18. Qual. rule: winner of each heat (Q) plus best second place (q) qualified.

==== Heat 1 ====
Rank	Athlete	Country	Time	Notes
1	Felipe Gomes; Guide: Leonardo Souza Lopes	Brazil	22.97	Q, PB
2	Elchin Muradov; Guide: Pavel Setin	Azerbaijan	23.41	RR
3	David Brown; Guide: Rolland Slade	United States	23.47	
4	Xue Lei; Guide: Wang Lin	China	25.91	
			Wind: +0.5 m/s	

==== Heat 2 ====
Rank	Athlete	Country	Time	Notes
1	Daniel Silva; Guide: Heitor de Oliveira Sales	Brazil	22.84	Q, PB
2	Shang Baolong; Guide: Shi Yang	China	23.22	RR
3	Gauthier Tresor Makunda; Guide: Antoine Laneyrie	France	DQ	
4	Arian Iznaga; Guide: Yaseen Perez Gomez	Cuba	DNS	
			Wind: -0.1 m/s	

==== Heat 3 ====
Rank	Athlete	Country	Time	Notes
1	Jose Sayovo Armando; Guide: Nicolau Palanca	Angola	22.84	Q, PB
2	Lucas Prado; Guide: Justino Barbosa dos Santos	Brazil	22.92	q, SB
3	Firmino Baptista; Guide: Ivo Vital	Portugal	24.06	
			Wind: -1.5 m/s	

=== Final ===
Competed 4 September 2012 at 20:15.

Rank	Athlete	Country	Time	Notes
1st place, gold medalist(s)	Felipe Gomes; Guide: Leonardo Souza Lopes	Brazil	22.97	=PB
2nd place, silver medalist(s)	Daniel Silva; Guide: Heitor de Oliveira Sales	Brazil	22.99	
3rd place, bronze medalist(s)	Jose Sayovo Armando; Guide: Nicolau Palanca	Angola	23.10	
4	Lucas Prado; Guide: Justino Barbosa dos Santos	Brazil	23.15	
			Wind: -0.3 m/s	

Q = qualified by place. q = qualified by time. RR = Regional Record. PB = Personal Best. SB = Seasonal Best. DQ = Disqualified. DNS = Did not start.
