= Athletics at the 2012 Summer Paralympics – Men's 200 metres T13 =

Men's 200 metres T13 at the XIV Paralympic Games
- Venue: London Olympic Stadium
- Dates: 6 and 7 September
- Competitors: 23 from 19 nations
- Winning time: 21.05

Medalists
1st place, gold medalist(s)		Jason Smyth	Ireland
2nd place, silver medalist(s)		Alexey Labzin	Russia
3rd place, bronze medalist(s)		Artem Loginov	Russia

Athletics at the 2012 Summer Paralympics
Classification
T/F11–13: Blind and visually impaired
T/F20: Intellectual disability
T/F31–38: Cerebral palsy
F40: Les Autres
T/F42–46: Amputees
T/F51–58: Spinal cord disability
Men T/F11–13
Track
100 m	T11	T12	T13
200 m	T11	T12	T13
400 m	T11	T12	T13
800 m		T12	T13
1500 m	T11		T13
5000 m	T11	T12
4×100 m relay	T11–13
Road
Marathon		T12
Field
Long jump	F11		F13
Triple jump	F11	F12
Shot put	F11–12
Discus throw	F11
Javelin throw		F12–13
Women T/F11–13
Track
100 m	T11	T12	T13
200 m	T11	T12
400 m		T12	T13
1500 m		T12
Field
Long jump	F11–12		F13
Shot put	F11–12
Discus throw	F11–12
Javelin throw		F12–13

The Men's 200 metres T13 event at the 2012 Summer Paralympics took place at the London Olympic Stadium on 6 and 7 September.

The T13 category is for athletes with a moderate visual impairment. Athletes in this category have a variety of visual impairments, but can typically recognize contours from a distance of 2 to 6 metres. Athletes in this category do not typically require a guide.

== Records ==
Prior to the competition, the existing World and Paralympic records were as follows:

World & Paralympic record	Jason Smyth (IRL)	21.43	16 September 2008	Beijing, China
Broken records during the 2012 Summer Paralympics
World record	Jason Smyth (IRL)	21.05	7 September 2012	

== Results ==
=== Round 1 ===
Competed 6 September 2012 from 11:20. Qual. rule: first 2 in each heat (Q) plus the 2 fastest other times (q) qualified.

==== Heat 1 ====
Rank	Athlete	Country	Time	Notes
1	Jonathan Ntutu	South Africa	22.40	Q, RR
2	Alexey Labzin	Russia	22.44	Q, SB
3	Ayoub Chaoui	Morocco	22.56	q, PB
4	Braedon Samuel Dolfo	Canada	23.25	
5	Mohammed Fannouna	Palestine	24.00	
6	Hugo Cavaco	Portugal	24.22	
7	Joan Munar Martinez	Spain	DNS	
			Wind: +1.3 m/s	

==== Heat 2 ====
Rank	Athlete	Country	Time	Notes
1	Alexander Zverev	Russia	22.18	Q, PB
2	Luis Felipe Gutierrez	Cuba	22.35	Q, SB
3	Ioannis Protos	Greece	22.70	q, SB
4	Hussein Kadhim	Iraq	23.06	
5	Philipp Handler	Switzerland	23.45	
6	Edgars Klavins	Latvia	24.35	PB
7	Per Jonsson	Sweden	24.42	SB
8	Radoslav Zlatanov	Bulgaria	DNS	
			Wind: +1.5 m/s	

==== Heat 3 ====
Rank	Athlete	Country	Time	Notes
1	Jason Smyth	Ireland	21.48	Q
2	Artem Loginov	Russia	22.46	Q, =PB
3	Djamil Nasser	Algeria	22.73	PB
4	Andre Andrade	Brazil	22.96	SB
5	Markeith Price	United States	23.55	
6	Songwut Lamsan	Thailand	23.73	SB
7	Mohamed Amguoun	Morocco	DNF	
8	Tobias Jonsson	Sweden	DNS	
			Wind: +0.2 m/s	

=== Final ===
Competed 7 September 2012 at 19:25.

Rank	Athlete	Country	Time	Notes
1st place, gold medalist(s)	Jason Smyth	Ireland	21.05	WR
2nd place, silver medalist(s)	Alexey Labzin	Russia	21.95	PB
3rd place, bronze medalist(s)	Artem Loginov	Russia	22.03	PB
4	Alexander Zverev	Russia	22.07	PB
5	Luis Felipe Gutierrez	Cuba	22.24	SB
6	Jonathan Ntutu	South Africa	22.37	RR
7	Ayoub Chaoui	Morocco	22.72	
8	Ioannis Protos	Greece	22.97	
			Wind: -0.3 m/s	

Q = qualified by place. q = qualified by time. WR = World Record. RR = Regional Record. PB = Personal Best. SB = Seasonal Best. DNS = Did not start. DNF = Did not finish.
