= Athletics at the 2012 Summer Paralympics – Men's 400 metres T12 =

Men's 400 metres T12 at the XIV Paralympic Games
- Venue: London Olympic Stadium
- Dates: 2 to 6 September
- Competitors: 15 from 14 nations
- Winning time: 48.52

Medalists
1st place, gold medalist(s)		Mahmoud Khaldi	Tunisia
2nd place, silver medalist(s)		Hilton Langenhoven	South Africa
3rd place, bronze medalist(s)		Jorge B. Gonzalez Sauceda	Mexico

Athletics at the 2012 Summer Paralympics
Classification
T/F11–13: Blind and visually impaired
T/F20: Intellectual disability
T/F31–38: Cerebral palsy
F40: Les Autres
T/F42–46: Amputees
T/F51–58: Spinal cord disability
Men T/F11–13
Track
100 m	T11	T12	T13
200 m	T11	T12	T13
400 m	T11	T12	T13
800 m		T12	T13
1500 m	T11		T13
5000 m	T11	T12
4×100 m relay	T11–13
Road
Marathon		T12
Field
Long jump	F11		F13
Triple jump	F11	F12
Shot put	F11–12
Discus throw	F11
Javelin throw		F12–13
Women T/F11–13
Track
100 m	T11	T12	T13
200 m	T11	T12
400 m		T12	T13
1500 m		T12
Field
Long jump	F11–12		F13
Shot put	F11–12
Discus throw	F11–12
Javelin throw		F12–13

The Men's 400 metres T12 event at the 2012 Summer Paralympics took place at the London Olympic Stadium from 2 to 6 September.

The T12 category is for athletes with visual impairment. Athletes in this category will generally have some residual sight, the ability to recognise the shape of a hand at a distance of 2 metres and the ability to perceive clearly will be no more than 2/60. T12 athletes commonly run with guides.

== Records ==
Prior to the competition, the existing World and Paralympic records were as follows:

World record	Gabriel Potra (POR)	48.62	25 July 2002	Villeneuve d'Ascq, France
Paralympic record	Adekundo Adesoji (NGR)	48.93	25 September 2004	Athens, Greece
Broken records during the 2012 Summer Paralympics
World record	Mahmoud Khaldi (TUN)	48.52	6 September 2012	

== Results ==
=== Round 1 ===
Competed 2 September 2012 from 19:00. Qual. rule: winner of each heat (Q) plus the 4 fastest other times (q) qualified.

==== Heat 1 ====
Rank	Athlete	Country	Time	Notes
1	Hilton Langenhoven	South Africa	49.86	Q
2	Thierb Siqueira; Guide: Roger Pereira Manarin	Brazil	50.80	q, SB
3	Rodolfo Alves	Portugal	54.00	

==== Heat 2 ====
Rank	Athlete	Country	Time	Notes
1	Jorge B. Gonzalez Sauceda	Mexico	50.83	Q, PB
2	Rza Osmanov	Azerbaijan	51.46	q, SB
3	Martin Amutenya Aloisius	Namibia	57.73	SB
4	Semih Deniz	Turkey	DQ	

==== Heat 3 ====
Rank	Athlete	Country	Time	Notes
1	Mahmoud Khaldi	Tunisia	50.58	Q, SB
2	Hyacinthe Deleplace	France	51.09	q, PB
3	Matthias Schroeder; Guide: Tobias Schneider	Germany	52.04	
4	Henry Nzungi Mwendo	Kenya	52.67	SB

==== Heat 4 ====
Rank	Athlete	Country	Time	Notes
1	Sun Qichao	China	50.91	Q
2	Gerard Desgarrega Puigdevall; Guide: Alejandro Guerrero Diaz	Spain	50.91	q, PB
3	Mehmet Nesim Oner	Turkey	52.53	PB
4	Suphachai Songphinit	Thailand	53.03	SB

=== Semifinals ===
Competed 4 September 2012 from 11:40. Qual. rule: winner of each heat (Q) plus the two fastest other times (q) qualified.

==== Heat 1 ====
Rank	Athlete	Country	Time	Notes
1	Hilton Langenhoven	South Africa	49.42	Q, =PB
2	Sun Qichao	China	50.96	
3	Rza Osmanov	Azerbaijan	51.34	SB
	Thierb Siqueira; Guide: Roger Pereira Manarin	Brazil	DQ	

==== Heat 2 ====
Rank	Athlete	Country	Time	Notes
1	Mahmoud Khaldi	Tunisia	49.02	Q, PB
2	Jorge B. Gonzalez Sauceda	Mexico	50.43	q, PB
3	Gerard Desgarrega Puigdevall; Guide: Alejandro Guerrero Diaz	Spain	50.43	q, PB
4	Hyacinthe Deleplace	France	51.40	

=== Final ===
Competed 6 September 2012 at 19:00.

Rank	Athlete	Country	Time	Notes
1st place, gold medalist(s)	Mahmoud Khaldi	Tunisia	48.52	WR
2nd place, silver medalist(s)	Hilton Langenhoven	South Africa	49.04	PB
3rd place, bronze medalist(s)	Jorge Benjamin Gonzalez Sauceda	Mexico	50.41	PB
4	Gerard Desgarrega Puigdevall; Guide: Alejandro Guerrero Diaz	Spain	50.68	

Q = qualified by place. q = qualified by time. WR = World Record. PB = Personal Best.
