= Athletics at the 2012 Summer Paralympics – Women's 100 metres T13 =

Women's 100 metres T13 at the XIV Paralympic Games
- Venue: London Olympic Stadium
- Dates: 5 and 6 September
- Competitors: 15 from 12 nations

Medalists
1st place, gold medalist(s)		Omara Durand	Cuba
2nd place, silver medalist(s)		Ilse Hayes	South Africa
3rd place, bronze medalist(s)		Nantenin Keita	France

Athletics at the 2012 Summer Paralympics
Classification
T/F11–13: Blind and visually impaired
T/F20: Intellectual disability
T/F31–38: Cerebral palsy
F40: Les Autres
T/F42–46: Amputees
T/F51–58: Spinal cord disability
Men T/F11–13
Track
100 m	T11	T12	T13
200 m	T11	T12	T13
400 m	T11	T12	T13
800 m		T12	T13
1500 m	T11		T13
5000 m	T11	T12
4×100 m relay	T11–13
Road
Marathon		T12
Field
Long jump	F11		F13
Triple jump	F11	F12
Shot put	F11–12
Discus throw	F11
Javelin throw		F12–13
Women T/F11–13
Track
100 m	T11	T12	T13
200 m	T11	T12
400 m		T12	T13
1500 m		T12
Field
Long jump	F11–12		F13
Shot put	F11–12
Discus throw	F11–12
Javelin throw		F12–13

The Women's 100 metres T13 event at the 2012 Summer Paralympics took place at the London Olympic Stadium on 5 and 6 September.

The T13 category is for athletes with a moderate visual impairment. Athletes in this category have a variety of visual impairments, but can typically recognize contours from a distance of 2 to 6 metres. Athletes in this category do not typically require a guide.

Broken records during the 2012 Summer Paralympics
Paralympic record	Omara Durand (CUB)	12.10	London, United Kingdom	5 September 2012
Paralympic record	Omara Durand (CUB)	12.00	London, United Kingdom	6 September 2012

== Results ==
=== Round 1 ===
Competed 5 September 2012 from 12:30. Qual. rule: first 3 in each heat (Q) plus the 2 fastest other times (q) qualified.

==== Heat 1 ====
Rank	Athlete	Country	Time	Notes
1	Olena Gliebova	Ukraine	12.63	Q
2	Alexandra Dimoglou	Greece	12.76	Q, SB
3	Johanna Pretorius	South Africa	13.11	Q, SB
4	Somaya Bousaid	Tunisia	13.41	SB
5	Lynda Hamri	Algeria	13.60	SB
6	Mary Letsoara	Lesotho	16.78	SB
7	Christine Akullo	Uganda	DNS	
8	Joana Helena Silva	Brazil	DNS	
			Wind: -1.5 m/s	

==== Heat 2 ====
Rank	Athlete	Country	Time	Notes
1	Omara Durand	Cuba	12.10	Q, PR
2	Ilse Hayes	South Africa	12.63	Q
3	Nantenin Keita	France	12.71	Q, SB
4	Anthi Karagianni	Greece	13.16	q, SB
5	Viviane Soares	Brazil	13.22	q, SB
6	Liu Ya-ting	Chinese Taipei	14.22	PB
7	Anna Duzikowska	Poland	14.31	
			Wind: -0.5 m/s	

=== Final ===
Competed 6 September 2012 at 20:20.

Rank	Athlete	Country	Time	Notes
1st place, gold medalist(s)	Omara Durand	Cuba	12.00	PR
2nd place, silver medalist(s)	Ilse Hayes	South Africa	12.41	
3rd place, bronze medalist(s)	Nantenin Keita	France	12.47	RR
4	Alexandra Dimoglou	Greece	12.53	PB
5	Olena Gliebova	Ukraine	12.64	
6	Viviane Soares	Brazil	13.02	PB
7	Anthi Karagianni	Greece	13.23	
8	Johanna Pretorius	South Africa	13.50	
			Wind: +0.5 m/s	

Q = qualified by place. q = qualified by time. PR = Paralympic Record. RR = Regional Record. PB = Personal Best. SB = Seasonal Best. DNS = Did not start.
