= Athletics at the 2012 Summer Paralympics – Men's 100 metres T13 =

Men's 100 metres T13 at the XIV Paralympic Games
- Venue: London Olympic Stadium
- Dates: 31 August and 1 September
- Competitors: 15 from 13 nations

Medalists
1st place, gold medalist(s)		Jason Smyth	Ireland
2nd place, silver medalist(s)		Luis Felipe Gutierrez	Cuba
3rd place, bronze medalist(s)		Jonathan Ntutu	South Africa

Athletics at the 2012 Summer Paralympics
Classification
T/F11–13: Blind and visually impaired
T/F20: Intellectual disability
T/F31–38: Cerebral palsy
F40: Les Autres
T/F42–46: Amputees
T/F51–58: Spinal cord disability
Men T/F11–13
Track
100 m	T11	T12	T13
200 m	T11	T12	T13
400 m	T11	T12	T13
800 m		T12	T13
1500 m	T11		T13
5000 m	T11	T12
4×100 m relay	T11–13
Road
Marathon		T12
Field
Long jump	F11		F13
Triple jump	F11	F12
Shot put	F11–12
Discus throw	F11
Javelin throw		F12–13
Women T/F11–13
Track
100 m	T11	T12	T13
200 m	T11	T12
400 m		T12	T13
1500 m		T12
Field
Long jump	F11–12		F13
Shot put	F11–12
Discus throw	F11–12
Javelin throw		F12–13

The Men's 100m T13 event for the 2012 Summer Paralympics took place at the London Olympic Stadium on 31 August and on 1 September.

The T13 category is for athletes with a moderate visual impairment. Athletes in this category have a variety of visual impairments, but can typically recognize contours from a distance of 2 to 6 metres. Athletes in this category do not typically require a guide.

== Results ==
=== Heats ===
Heats took place on 31 August 2012. Jason Smyth broke his own world record in 10.54, while Jonathan Ntutu broke the African record.

Rank	Heat	Name	Nationality	Time	Notes
1	1	Jason Smyth	Ireland	10.54	Q, WR
2	1	Luis Felipe Gutierrez	Cuba	10.94	Q
3	2	Jonathan Ntutu	South Africa	11.00	Q, AF
4	2	Radoslav Zlatanov	Bulgaria	11.10	Q
5	2	Alexey Labzin	Russia	11.15	Q
6	1	Artem Loginov	Russia	11.16	Q
7	2	André Andrade	Brazil	11.22	q
8	1	Braedon Dolfo	Canada	11.26	q
9	1	Ayoub Chaoui	Morocco	11.37	
10	2	Philipp Handler	Switzerland	11.45	
11	2	Songwut Lamsan	Thailand	11.59	
12	1	Joan Munar Martinez	Spain	11.60	
13	2	Mohammed Fannouna	Palestine	11.88	
14	1	Biondi Misasi	Suriname	11.92	
15	2	Mohamed Amguoun	Morocco	12.66	

=== Final ===
The final took place on 1 September 2012. Jason Smyth of Ireland won gold in a new world record time of 10.46. Luis Felipe Gutierrez took silver for his second medal of the Games, with the South African Ntutu just clinching bronze.

Rank	Name	Nationality	Time	Notes
1st place, gold medalist(s)	Jason Smyth	Ireland	10.46	WR
2nd place, silver medalist(s)	Luis Felipe Gutierrez	Cuba	11.02	
3rd place, bronze medalist(s)	Jonathan Ntutu	South Africa	11.03	
4	Alexey Labzin	Russia	11.03	
5	Artem Loginov	Russia	11.18	
6	Radoslav Zlatanov	Bulgaria	11.25	
7	Braedon Dolfo	Canada	11.27	
8	André Andrade	Brazil	11.28	
