= Athletics at the 2012 Summer Paralympics – Women's 1500 metres T12 =

Women's 1500 metres T12 at the XIV Paralympic Games
- Venue: London Olympic Stadium
- Dates: 4 September
- Competitors: 9 from 9 nations
- Winning time: 4:37.65

Medalists
1st place, gold medalist(s)		Elena Pautova	Russia
2nd place, silver medalist(s)		Elena Congost	Spain
3rd place, bronze medalist(s)		Annalisa Minetti; Andrea Giocondi	Italy

Athletics at the 2012 Summer Paralympics
Classification
T/F11–13: Blind and visually impaired
T/F20: Intellectual disability
T/F31–38: Cerebral palsy
F40: Les Autres
T/F42–46: Amputees
T/F51–58: Spinal cord disability
Men T/F11–13
Track
100 m	T11	T12	T13
200 m	T11	T12	T13
400 m	T11	T12	T13
800 m		T12	T13
1500 m	T11		T13
5000 m	T11	T12
4×100 m relay	T11–13
Road
Marathon		T12
Field
Long jump	F11		F13
Triple jump	F11	F12
Shot put	F11–12
Discus throw	F11
Javelin throw		F12–13
Women T/F11–13
Track
100 m	T11	T12	T13
200 m	T11	T12
400 m		T12	T13
1500 m		T12
Field
Long jump	F11–12		F13
Shot put	F11–12
Discus throw	F11–12
Javelin throw		F12–13

The Women's 1500 metres T12 event at the 2012 Summer Paralympics took place at the London Olympic Stadium on 4 September. The event consisted of a single race.

The T12 category is for athletes with visual impairment. Athletes in this category will generally have some residual sight, the ability to recognise the shape of a hand at a distance of 2 metres and the ability to perceive clearly will be no more than 2/60. T12 athletes commonly run with guides.

== Records ==
Prior to the competition, the existing World and Paralympic records were as follows:

World & Paralympic record (T11)	Miroslava Sedlackova (CZE)	4:53.78	14 September 2008	Beijing, China
World & Paralympic record (T12)	Assia El Hannouni (FRA)	4:19.20	14 September 2008	Beijing, China
Broken records during the 2012 Summer Paralympics
World record (T11)	Annalisa Minetti (ITA)	4:48.88	4 September 2012	

== Results ==
Competed 4 September 2012 at 19:44.

Rank	Athlete	Country	Class	Time	Notes
1st place, gold medalist(s)	Elena Pautova	Russia	T12	4:37.65	SB
2nd place, silver medalist(s)	Elena Congost	Spain	T12	4:43.53	
3rd place, bronze medalist(s)	Annalisa Minetti; Guide: Andrea Giocondi	Italy	T11	4:48.88	WR
4	Meryem En-Nourhi; Guide: Mustapha Sanjach	Morocco	T12	4:50.94	PB
5	Miroslava Sedlackova; Guide: Michal Prochazka	Czech Republic	T11	4:57.99	PB
6	Maritza Arango Buitrago; Guide: Jonathan Sanchez Gonzalez	Colombia	T11	5:05.72	RR
7	Sumeyye Ozcan; Guide: Ibrahim Kizilkaya	Turkey	T11	5:10.68	PB
8	Maria Fiuza	Portugal	T12	5:21.75	
	Ana Isabel Tavera Gonzalez; Guide: Aldo Gomez Hernandez	Mexico	T12	DQ	

Q = qualified by place. q = qualified by time. WR = World Record. RR = Regional Record. PB = Personal Best. SB = Seasonal Best.
