= Athletics at the 2012 Summer Paralympics – Women's 200 metres T12 =

Women's 200 metres T12 at the XIV Paralympic Games
- Venue: London Olympic Stadium
- Dates: 6 September
- Competitors: 12 from 11 nations
- Winning time: 24.46

Medalists
1st place, gold medalist(s)		Assia El Hannouni; Gautier Simounet	France
2nd place, silver medalist(s)		Zhou Guohua; Li Jie	China
3rd place, bronze medalist(s)		Zhu Daqing; Zhang Hui	China

Athletics at the 2012 Summer Paralympics
Classification
T/F11–13: Blind and visually impaired
T/F20: Intellectual disability
T/F31–38: Cerebral palsy
F40: Les Autres
T/F42–46: Amputees
T/F51–58: Spinal cord disability
Men T/F11–13
Track
100 m	T11	T12	T13
200 m	T11	T12	T13
400 m	T11	T12	T13
800 m		T12	T13
1500 m	T11		T13
5000 m	T11	T12
4×100 m relay	T11–13
Road
Marathon		T12
Field
Long jump	F11		F13
Triple jump	F11	F12
Shot put	F11–12
Discus throw	F11
Javelin throw		F12–13
Women T/F11–13
Track
100 m	T11	T12	T13
200 m	T11	T12
400 m		T12	T13
1500 m		T12
Field
Long jump	F11–12		F13
Shot put	F11–12
Discus throw	F11–12
Javelin throw		F12–13

The Women's 200 metres T12 event at the 2012 Summer Paralympics took place at the London Olympic Stadium on 6 September. The event consisted of 3 heats and a final.

The T12 category is for athletes with visual impairment. Athletes in this category will generally have some residual sight, the ability to recognise the shape of a hand at a distance of 2 metres and the ability to perceive clearly will be no more than 2/60. T12 athletes commonly run with guides.

== Records ==
Prior to the competition, the existing World and Paralympic records were as follows:

World & Paralympic record	Assia El Hannouni (FRA)	24.84	16 September 2008	Beijing, China
Broken records during the 2012 Summer Paralympics
World record	Assia El Hannouni (FRA)	24.80	6 September 2012	
World record	Assia El Hannouni (FRA)	24.46	6 September 2012	

== Results ==
=== Round 1 ===
Competed 6 September 2012 from 12:55. Qual. rule: winner of each heat (Q) plus best second place (q) qualified.

==== Heat 1 ====
Rank	Athlete	Country	Time	Notes
1	Assia El Hannouni; Guide: Gautier Simounet	France	24.80	Q, WR
2	Zhou Guohua; Guide: Li Jie	China	24.89	q, RR
3	Volha Zinkevich	Belarus	26.97	PB
4	Daniela E. Velasco Maldonado; Guide: Jose Guadalupe Fuentes Ortiz	Mexico	26.97	
			Wind: -0.1 m/s	

==== Heat 2 ====
Rank	Athlete	Country	Time	Notes
1	Oxana Boturchuk	Ukraine	25.20	Q, PB
2	Alice de Oliveira Correa; Guide: Diogo Cardoso da Silva	Brazil	25.92	PB
3	Hana Kolníková; Guide: Jan Surgac	Slovakia	26.32	
4	Maria Muchavo	Mozambique	28.28	PB
			Wind: +0.9 m/s	

==== Heat 3 ====
Rank	Athlete	Country	Time	Notes
1	Zhu Daqing; Guide: Zhang Hui	China	24.80	Q, =WR
2	Libby Clegg; Guide: Mikail Huggins	Great Britain	25.10	PB
3	Elisabetta Stefanini; Guide: Massimo di Marcello	Italy	27.14	
4	Hanah Ngendo Mwangi	Kenya	DQ	
			Wind: -0.6 m/s	

=== Final ===
Competed 6 September 2012 at 19:16.

Rank	Athlete	Country	Time	Notes
1st place, gold medalist(s)	Assia El Hannouni; Guide: Gautier Simounet	France	24.46	WR
2nd place, silver medalist(s)	Zhou Guohua; Guide: Li Jie	China	24.66	RR
3rd place, bronze medalist(s)	Zhu Daqing; Guide: Zhang Hui	China	24.88	
4	Oxana Boturchuk	Ukraine	24.92	PB
			Wind: +0.3 m/s	

Q = qualified by place. q = qualified by time. WR = World Record. RR = Regional Record. PB = Personal Best. SB = Seasonal Best.
