= Athletics at the 2015 Parapan American Games – Women's 100 metres T11 =

Athletics – Women's 100 metres T11 at the 2015 Parapan American Games
- Venue: CIBC Athletics Stadium
- Dates: August 11
- Competitors: 4 from 2 nations

Medalists
| 1st place, gold medalist(s) | | Terezinha Guilhermina (Guide: Guilherme Soares de Santana) | Brazil |
| 2nd place, silver medalist(s) | | Jhulia dos Santos (Guide: Fabio Dias de Oliveira Silva) | Brazil |
| 3rd place, bronze medalist(s) | | Jerusa Geber dos Santos (Guide: Luiz Barboza da Silva) | Brazil |

The women's T11 100 metres competition of the athletics events at the 2015 Parapan American Games was held on August 11 at the CIBC Athletics Stadium. The defending Parapan American Games champion was Terezinha Guilhermina of Brazil.

== Records ==
Prior to this competition, the existing world and Americas records were as follows:

| World record | Terezinha Guilhermina (BRA) | 12.01 | London, Great Britain | September 5, 2012 |
| Americas Record | Terezinha Guilhermina (BRA) | 12.01 | London, Great Britain | September 5, 2012 |
| Parapan Record | Terezinha Guilhermina (BRA) | 12.29 | Guadalajara, Mexico | November 14, 2011 |

== Schedule ==
All times are Central Standard Time (UTC-6).

| Date | Time | Round |
|---|---|---|
| 11 August | 18:18 | Final |

== Results ==
All times are shown in seconds.

| KEY: | q | Fastest non-qualifiers | Q | Qualified | PR | Parapan American Games record | AR | Area record | NR | National record | PB | Personal best | SB | Seasonal best | DSQ | Disqualified | FS | False start |

=== Final ===
Wind +3.1 m/s

| Rank | Name | Nation | Time | Notes |
|---|---|---|---|---|
| 1st place, gold medalist(s) | Terezinha Guilhermina (Guide: Guilherme Soares de Santana) | Brazil | 12.02 | |
| 2nd place, silver medalist(s) | Jhulia dos Santos (Guide: Fabio Dias de Oliveira Silva) | Brazil | 12.40 | |
| 3rd place, bronze medalist(s) | Jerusa Geber dos Santos (Guide: Luiz Barboza da Silva) | Brazil | 12.51 | |
| 4 | Rosibel Colmenares (Guide: Jose Aranguren) | Venezuela | 14.73 | |
