= Dong Hewei =

Chinese Paralympic athlete

Personal information
- Nationality: Chinese
- Born: Hangzhou, China
- Height: 178 cm (5 ft 10 in)

Sport
- Country: China
- Sport: Athletics
- Disability class: F12
- Event: triple jump
- Club: Zhejiang Province
- Coached by: Wei Runlian; Wang Fei
Medal record
Paralympic athletics
Representing China
Paralympic Games
Bronze medal – third place	2012 London	Triple jump- F12

Dong Hewei is a visually impaired Paralympian athlete from China competing mainly in T11 classification sprint and long jump events. Zhou won two medals at her first Summer Paralympics, the 2012 London Games, in the women's 200m sprint (bronze) and the long jump (silver). Jia is also a World Championships and Asian Games medalists, winning seven medals over five tournaments.
