= Jhulia Dos Santos =

Brazilian Paralympic athlete

Jhulia dos Santos
Personal information
- Full name: Jhulia Karol dos Santos Dias da Fonseca
- Born: 18 September 1991 (age 34) Terra Santa, Pará, Brazil
- Height: 149 cm (4 ft 11 in)

Sport
- Country: Brazil
- Sport: Para athletics
- Disability class: T11
- Club: Urece EC: Rio de Janeiro
- Coached by: Amaury Verissimo (national); Fabio Dias de Oliveira (personal)
Medal record
Women's para athletics
Representing Brazil
Paralympic Games
Bronze medal – third place	2012 London	100m T11
IPC World Championships
Bronze medal – third place	2013 Lyon	100 m T11
Bronze medal – third place	2015 Doha	100 m T11
Bronze medal – third place	2015 Doha	200 m T11
Parapan American Games
Bronze medal – third place	2011 Guadalajara	100 m T11
Silver medal – second place	2015 Toronto	100 m T11

Jhulia Karol dos Santos Dias da Fonseca (born 18 September 1991) is a visually impaired Brazilian sprinter. Competing in the T11 classification, Dos Santos represented Brazil at the 2012 Summer Paralympics in London winning a bronze medal in the 100m sprint. She is also a multiple World Championships and Parapan American medalist, taking five medals over four tournaments.
