= Jerusa Geber dos Santos =

Brazilian Paralympic athlete (born 1982)

Jerusa Geber
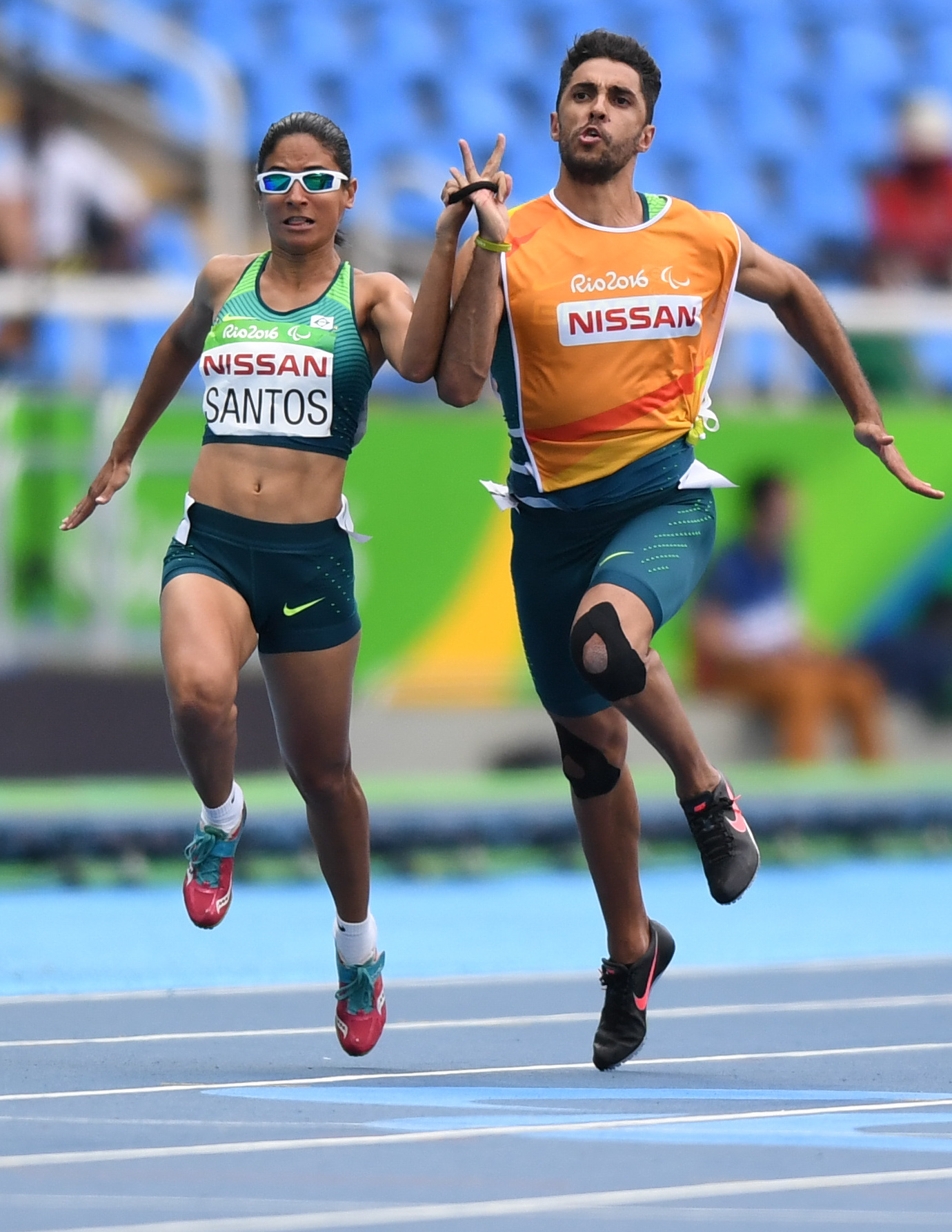
- Jerusa Geber with her guide, Guilherme Santana, at the Rio 2016 Paralympics

Personal information
- Full name: Jerusa Geber dos Santos
- Born: 26 April 1982 (age 44) Rio Branco, Brazil
- Height: 161 cm (5 ft 3 in)

Sport
- Country: Brazil
- Sport: Para athletics
- Disability class: T11
- Club: Clube Amigos dos Deficientes
- Coached by: Amaury Verissimo (national); Elizeu de Senna (personal)
Medal record
Representing Brazil
Women's para athletics
Paralympic Games
Gold medal – first place	2024 Paris	100 m T11
Gold medal – first place	2024 Paris	200 m T11
Silver medal – second place	2012 London	100 m T11
Silver medal – second place	2012 London	200 m T11
Bronze medal – third place	2008 Beijing	200 m T11
Bronze medal – third place	2020 Tokyo	200 m T11
World Championships
Gold medal – first place	2011 Christchurch	4 × 100 m relay T11-13
Gold medal – first place	2019 Dubai	100 m T11
Gold medal – first place	2023 Paris	200 m T11
Gold medal – first place	2023 Paris	200 m T11
Gold medal – first place	2024 Kobe	100 m T11
Gold medal – first place	2025 New Delhi	100 m T11
Gold medal – first place	2025 New Delhi	200 m T11
Silver medal – second place	2011 Christchurch	100 m T11
Silver medal – second place	2011 Christchurch	200 m T11
Silver medal – second place	2013 Lyon	100 m T11
Silver medal – second place	2013 Lyon	200 m T11
Silver medal – second place	2015 Doha	100 m T11
Bronze medal – third place	2024 Kobe	200 m T11
Parapan American Games
Gold medal – first place	2019 Lima	100 m T11
Gold medal – first place	2019 Lima	200 m T11
Gold medal – first place	2023 Santiago	200 m T11
Silver medal – second place	2011 Guadalajara	100 m T11
Silver medal – second place	2011 Guadalajara	200 m T11
Bronze medal – third place	2015 Toronto	100 m T11
Bronze medal – third place	2015 Toronto	400 m T11
Women's para-cycling
Track World Championships
Bronze medal – third place	2026 Apeldoorn	Mixed team sprint B

Jerusa Geber dos Santos (born 26 April 1982) is a visually impaired Brazilian sprinter. Competing in the T11 classification, Geber has competed in five Summer Paralympic Games, winning two gold, two silver and two bronze medals. She is also a multiple World Championships and Parapan American medalist, taking ten medals over five tournaments.

== Life ==
She was born with cataracts in 1982 and after having glaucoma she became totally blind when she was eighteen. When she was nineteen a friend suggested that she should take up athletics and in 2005 she first represented her country. She is supported by her husband, Luiz Henrique da Silva, who has been her guide in some T11 races.

== Career ==
She won a bronze medal at the 2008 Summer Paralympics, and two silver medals at the 2012 Summer Paralympics. She won a gold medal in Lima at the 2019 Parapan American Games and in the same year she won another at the World Championships in Dubai.

She qualified for the 2020 Summer Paralympics, in Women's 100m T11, and Women's 200m T11. She was one of the first dozen Paralympians cleared to compete at the Tokyo Paralympics postponed to 2021. Other early choices to be included were Thalita Simplício (who also competes in T11), Rayane Soares (T13), Beth Gomes (F52), Claudiney Batista (F56), Cícero Valdiran (F57) and Thiago Paulino.

At the 2024 Summer Paralympics in Paris, she won gold meals in Women's 100m and 200m T11. Her running guide was Gabriel Garcia, who competed in Men's 4 × 100 metres relay in the 2024 Summer Olympics.

In 2025, Geber won two gold medals at the 2025 World Para Athletics Championships in New Delhi, successfully defending her 100 m T11 title and winning the 200 m T11 final in 24.88 seconds. With these results, she became Brazil’s most-decorated athlete in World Para Athletics Championships history, surpassing Terezinha Guilhermina with a total of 13 career medals at the event.
