= Yang Yuqing =

Chinese Paralympic sprinter

Medal record

Track and field (T12)

Representing China

Paralympic Games
Gold medal – first place	2008 Beijing	4x100m - T11-13
Bronze medal – third place	2008 Beijing	100m - T12
Bronze medal – third place	2008 Beijing	200m - T12

Yang Yuqing (Chinese: 杨育青; pinyin: Yáng Yùqīng) is a Paralympian athlete from China competing mainly in category T12 sprint events.

He competed in the 2008 Summer Paralympics in Beijing, China. There he won a gold medal in the men's 4 x 100 metre relay - T11-13 event, a bronze medal in the men's 100 metres - T12 event and a bronze medal in the men's 200 metres - T12 event
