= Terezinha Guilhermina =

Brazilian Paralympic athlete

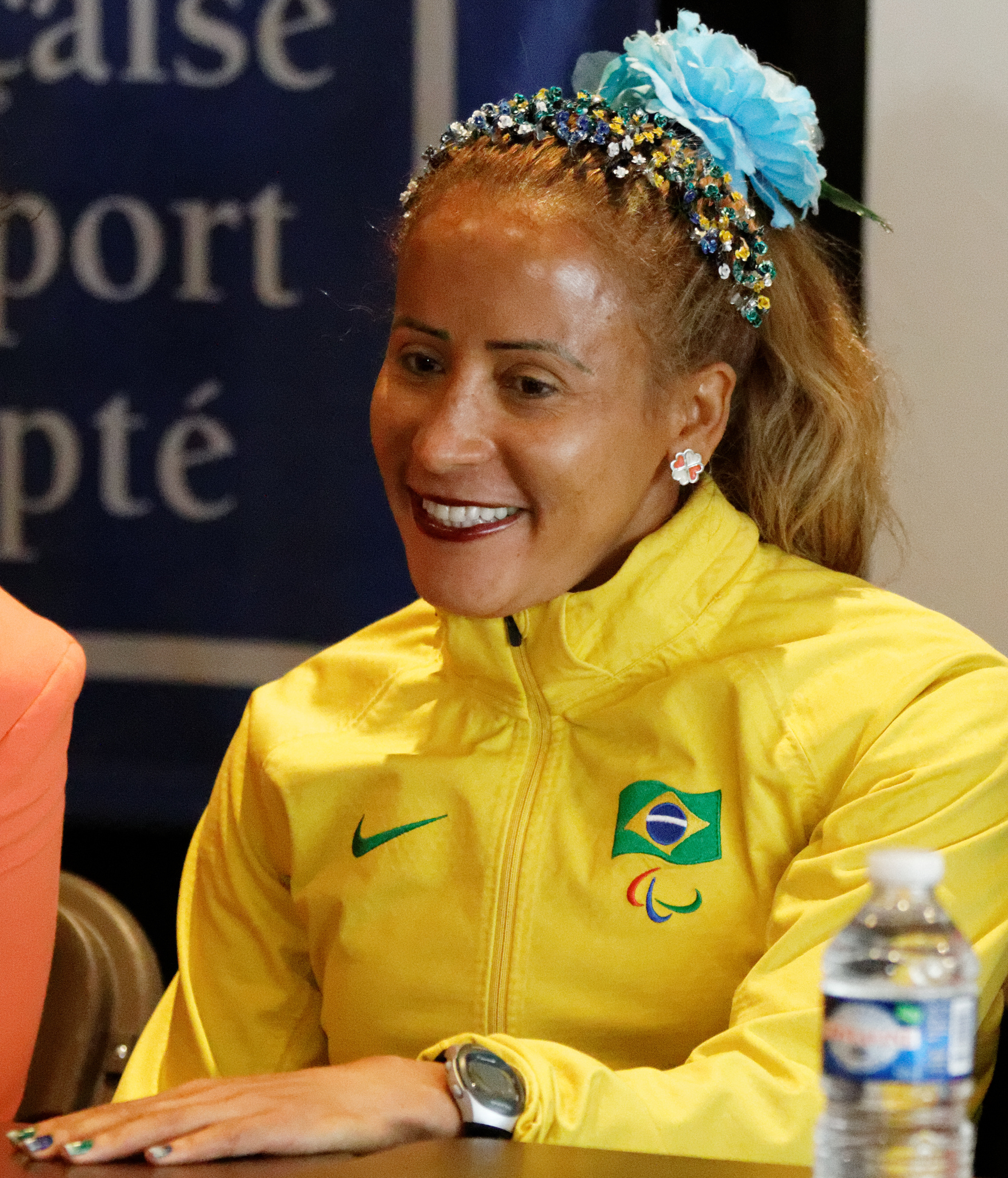
- Guilhermina in 2014

Personal information
- Nationality: Brazilian
- Born: 3 October 1978 (age 47)
- Height: 1.63 m (5 ft 4 in)

Sport
- Sport: Para athletics
- Disability class: T11
- Event: Sprint
Medal record
Women's para athletics
Representing Brazil
Paralympic Games
| Gold medal – first place | 2008 Beijing | 200 m T11 |
| Gold medal – first place | 2012 London | 100 m T11 |
| Gold medal – first place | 2012 London | 200 m T11 |
| Silver medal – second place | 2008 Beijing | 100 m T11 |
| Silver medal – second place | 2016 Rio de Janeiro | 4 × 100 m – T11-13 |
| Bronze medal – third place | 2004 Athens | 400 m T12 |
| Bronze medal – third place | 2008 Beijing | 400 m T11 |
| Bronze medal – third place | 2016 Rio de Janeiro | 400 m T11 |
IPC World Championships
| Gold medal – first place | 2011 Christchurch | 100 m T11 |
| Gold medal – first place | 2011 Christchurch | 200 m T11 |
| Gold medal – first place | 2011 Christchurch | 400 m T11 |
| Gold medal – first place | 2011 Christchurch | 4x100 m T11-13 |
| Gold medal – first place | 2013 Lyon | 100 m T11 |
| Gold medal – first place | 2013 Lyon | 200 m T11 |
| Gold medal – first place | 2013 Lyon | 400 m T11 |
| Silver medal – second place | 2015 Doha | 200 m T11 |
| Silver medal – second place | 2015 Doha | 400 m T11 |
Parapan American Games
| Gold medal – first place | 2007 Rio de Janeiro | 100m T11 |
| Gold medal – first place | 2007 Rio de Janeiro | 200m T11 |
| Gold medal – first place | 2011 Guadalajara | 100m T11 |
| Gold medal – first place | 2011 Guadalajara | 200m T11 |
| Gold medal – first place | 2011 Guadalajara | 400m T12 |
| Gold medal – first place | 2015 Toronto | 100m T11 |
| Gold medal – first place | 2015 Toronto | 200m T11 |
| Gold medal – first place | 2015 Toronto | 400m T11 |
| Silver medal – second place | 2007 Rio de Janeiro | 400m T13 |

Terezinha Guilhermina (born 3 October 1978) is a Paralympic athlete from Brazil competing mainly in category T11 sprint events, T11 being the category for totally blind athletes. She has congenital retinitis pigmentosa, as do five of her twelve brothers.

She competed in the 2004 Summer Paralympics in Athens, Greece. There she won a bronze medal in the women's 400 metres – T12 event, went out in the first round of the women's 800 metres – T12 event and finished seventh in the women's 1500 metres – T12 event. She also competed at the 2008 Summer Paralympics in Beijing, China. There she won a gold medal in the women's 200 metres – T11 event, a silver medal in the women's 100 metres – T11 event and a bronze medal in the women's 400 metres – T11 event. In London 2012, she won two gold medals. In Rio 2016, she won silver in the women's 4 × 100 m relay - T11-13 and bronze in the women's 400m - T11. She was disqualified from the 200m T11 and 100m T11 after a false start. Her guide runner in Rio was Rafael Lazarini.
