= Athletics at the 2012 Summer Paralympics – Men's 4 × 100 metres relay =

The Men's 4 × 100 m Relay athletics events for the 2012 Summer Paralympics took place at the London Olympic Stadium on 5 September. A total of two events were contested over this distance incorporating six different classifications.

== Results ==
=== T11-T13 ===
Rank	Lane	Nation	Competitors	Time	Notes
1st place, gold medalist(s)	4	Russia	Evgeny Kegelev, Alexey Labzin, Fedor Trikolich, Andrey Koptev	42.66	PR
2nd place, silver medalist(s)	3	China	Xue Lei, Yuan Yizhi, Yang Yuqing, Li Yansong	42.68	RR
3rd place, bronze medalist(s)	1	Azerbaijan	Elchin Muradov, Rza Osmanov, Oleg Panyutin, Vladimir Zayets	43.92	SB
4	2	Spain	Gerard Desgarrega, Maximiliano Rodríguez, Xavier Porras, Joan Munar Martínez	—	DNF

=== T42-T46 ===
South Africa won with a world record time of 41.78 seconds. The team included Samkelo Radebe on the first leg, Zivan Smith on the second leg, Arnu Fourie on the third leg and Oscar Pistorius on the anchor leg.

Rank	Lane	Nation	Competitors	Time	Notes
1st place, gold medalist(s)	6	South Africa	Samkelo Radebe, Zivan Smith, Arnu Fourie, Oscar Pistorius	41.78	WR
2nd place, silver medalist(s)	1	China	Liu Zhiming, Liu Fuliang, Xie Hexing, Zhao Xu	42.98	RR
3rd place, bronze medalist(s)	5	Germany	Markus Rehm, Heinrich Popow, David Behre, Wojtek Czyz	45.23	SB
4	4	Japan	Tomoki Tagawa, Keita Sato, Toru Suzuki, Jun Haruta	45.36	SB
—	3	Brazil	Emicarlo Souza, Yohansson Nascimento, Antonio Souza, Alan Fonteles Cardoso Oliveira	—	DSQ
—	2	France	Arnaud Assoumani, Alain Akakpo, Jean-Baptiste Alaize, Clavel Kayitaré	—	DSQ
—	7	United States	Jerome Singleton, Richard Browne, Jarryd Wallace, Blake Leeper	—	DSQ
