= Athletics at the 2012 Summer Paralympics T/F51–58 =

Athletics at the XIV Paralympic Games
- Paralympic Athletics
- Venue: Olympic Stadium; The Mall
- Dates: 31 August – 9 September 2012
- Competitors: 1100 (740 men, 360 women)

Athletics at the 2012 Summer Paralympics
Classification
T/F11–13: Blind and visually impaired
T/F20: Intellectual disability
T/F31–38: Cerebral palsy
F40: Les Autres
T/F42–46: Amputees
T/F51–58: Spinal cord disability
Men T/F51–58
Track
100 m	T51	T52	T53	T54
200 m	T52	T53
400 m	T52	T53	T54
800 m	T52	T53	T54
1500 m	T54
5000 m	T54
4×400 m relay	T53-54
Road
Marathon	T54
Field
Shot put	F52-3	F54-6
F57-8
Club throw	F31-32/51
Discus throw	F51-3	F54-6
F57-8
Javelin throw	F52-3	F54-6
F57-8
Women T/F51–58
Track
100 m	T52	T53	T54
200 m	T52	T53
400 m	T53	T54
800 m	T53	T54
1500 m	T54
5000 m	T54
Road
Marathon	T54
Field
Shot put	F54-6
F57-8
Club throw	F31-32/51
Discus throw	F51-3
F57-8
Javelin throw	F33-34/52-53	F54-6
F57-8

Athletics events at the 2012 Summer Paralympics were held in the Olympic Stadium and in The Mall in London, United Kingdom, from 31 August to 9 September 2012. 43 events were staged for athletes with spinal cord disabilities, and 3 staged jointly with cerebral palsy classes.

== Classification ==
Athletes were given a classification depending on the type and extent of their disability. The classification system allowed athletes to compete against others with a similar level of function.

The athletics classifications are:

- 11–13: Blind (11) and visually impaired (12, 13) athletes
- 20: Athletes with an intellectual disability
- 31–38: Athletes with cerebral palsy
- 40: Les Autres (others) (including people with dwarfism)
- 42–46: Amputees
- 51–58: Athletes with a spinal cord disability

The class numbers were given prefixes of "T" and "F" for track and field events, respectively.

== Medal summary ==
=== Men's events ===
Event	Classification	Gold	Silver	Bronze
100 m	T51	Toni Piispanen; Finland	Alvise de Vidi; Italy	Mohamed Berrahal; Algeria
100 m	T52	Raymond Martin; United States	Salvador Hernandez Mondragon; Mexico	Paul Nitz; United States
100 m	T53	Mickey Bushell; Great Britain	Zhao Yufei; China	Yu Shiran; China
100 m	T54	Leo Pekka Tahti; Finland	Liu Yang; China	Saichon Konjen; Thailand
200 m	T52	Raymond Martin; United States	Tomoya Ito; Japan	Salvador Hernandez Mondragon; Mexico
200 m	T53	Li Huzhao; China	Brent Lakatos; Canada	Zhao Yufei; China
400 m	T52	Raymond Martin; United States	Tomoya Ito; Japan	Thomas Geierspichler; Austria
400 m	T53	Li Huzhao; China	Brent Lakatos; Canada	Richard Colman; Australia
400 m	T54	Zhang Lixin; China	Kenny van Weeghel; Netherlands	Liu Chengming; China
800 m	T52	Raymond Martin; United States	Tomoya Ito; Japan	Leonardo De Jesus Perez Juarez; Mexico
800 m	T53	Richard Colman; Australia	Brent Lakatos; Canada	Joshua George; United States
800 m	T54	David Weir; Great Britain	Marcel Hug; Switzerland	Saichon Konjen; Thailand
1500 m	T54	David Weir; Great Britain	Prawat Wahoram; Thailand	Kim Gyu Dae; South Korea
5000 m	T54	David Weir; Great Britain	Kurt Fearnley; Australia	Julien Casoli; France
Marathon	T54	David Weir; Great Britain	Marcel Hug; Switzerland	Kurt Fearnley; Australia
4 × 400 m relay	T53/T54	China (CHN); Liu Yang; Liu Chengming; Li Huzhao; Zhang Lixin	Thailand (THA); Supachai Koysub; Saichon Konjen; Sopa Intasen; Prawat Wahoram	Australia (AUS); Richard Nicholson; Natheniel Arkley; Matthew Cameron; Richard Colman
Shot put	F52/53	Aigars Apinis; Latvia	Mauro Maximo de Jesus; Mexico	Scot Severn; United States
Shot put	F54/55/56	Jalil Bagheri Jeddi; Iran	Karol Kozun; Poland	Robin Womack; Great Britain
Shot put	F57/58	Alexey Ashapatov; Russia	Janusz Rokicki; Poland	Michael Louwrens; South Africa
Club throw	F31/32/51	Zeljko Dimitrijevic; Serbia	Radim Beles; Czech Republic	Lahouari Bahlaz (*); Algeria
Discus throw	F51/52/53	Mohamed Berrahal; Algeria	Aigars Apinis; Latvia	Mohamed Zemzemi; Tunisia
Discus throw	F54/55/56	Leonardo Diaz; Cuba	Draženko Mitrović; Serbia	Ali Mohammad Yari; Iran
Discus throw	F57/58	Alexey Ashapatov; Russia	Rostislav Pohlmann; Czech Republic	Metawa Abouelkhir; Egypt
Javelin throw	F52/53	Alphanso Cunningham; Jamaica	Abdolreza Jokar; Iran	Mauro Maximo de Jesus; Mexico
Javelin throw	F54/55/56	Luis Alberto Zepeda Felix; Mexico	Alexey Kuznetsov; Russia	Manolis Stefanoudakis; Greece
Javelin throw	F57/58	Mohammad Khalvandi; Iran	Claudiney Batista dos Santos; Brazil	Raed Salem; Egypt

(*) class F32 athlete

=== Women's events ===
Event	Classification	Gold	Silver	Bronze
100 m	T52	Marieke Vervoort; Belgium	Michelle Stilwell; Canada	Kerry Morgan; United States
100 m	T53	Huang Lisha; China	Zhou Hongzhuan; China	Angela Ballard; Australia
100 m	T54	Liu Wenjun; China	Dong Hongjiao; China	Tatyana McFadden; United States
200 m	T52	Michelle Stilwell; Canada	Marieke Vervoort; Belgium	Kerry Morgan; United States
200 m	T53	Huang Lisha; China	Angela Ballard; Australia	Zhou Hongzhuan; China
400 m	T53	Zhou Hongzhuan; China	Angela Ballard; Australia	Huang Lisha; China
400 m	T54	Tatyana McFadden; United States	Dong Hongjiao; China	Edith Wolf; Switzerland
800 m	T53	Zhou Hongzhuan; China	Huang Lisha; China	Jessica Galli; United States
800 m	T54	Tatyana McFadden; United States	Edith Wolf; Switzerland	Zou Lihong; China
1500 m	T54	Tatyana McFadden; United States	Edith Wolf; Switzerland	Shirley Reilly; United States
5000 m	T54	Edith Wolf; Switzerland	Shirley Reilly; United States	Christie Dawes; Australia
Marathon	T54	Shirley Reilly; United States	Shelly Woods; Great Britain	Sandra Graf; Switzerland
Shot put	F54/55/56	Yang Liwan; China	Marianne Buggenhagen; Germany	Angela Madsen; United States
Shot put	F57/58	Angeles Ortiz Hernandez; Mexico	Stela Eneva; Bulgaria	Eucharia Iyiazi; Nigeria
Club throw	F31/32/51	All medals were won by class F32 athletes		
Discus throw	F51/52/53	Josie Pearson; Great Britain	O Neill Catherine; Ireland	Zena Cole; United States
Discus throw	F57/58	Nassima Saifi; Algeria	Stela Eneva; Bulgaria	Orla Barry; Ireland
Javelin	F33/34/52/53	All medals were won by class F34 athletes		
Javelin	F54/55/56	Yang Liwan; China	Hania Aidi; Tunisia	Martina Willing; Germany
Javelin	F57/58	Liu Ming; China	Safia Djelal; Algeria	Larisa Volik; Russia

== See also ==
- Athletics at the 2012 Summer Olympics
