= Athletics at the 2012 Summer Paralympics – Men's long jump =

The Men's Long Jump athletics events for the 2012 Summer Paralympics took place at the London Olympic Stadium from August 31 to September 5. A total of 7 events were contested for 7 different classifications.

== Schedule ==
Event↓/Date →	Fri 31	Sat 1	Sun 2	Mon 3	Tue 4	Wed 5
F11 Long Jump					F	
F13 Long Jump		F				
F20 Long Jump					F	
F36 Long Jump						F
F37–38 Long Jump						F
F42–44 Long Jump	F					
F46 Long Jump				F		

== Results ==
=== F11 ===
Rank	Athlete	Nationality	Order		1	2	3	4	5	6	Best	Notes
1st place, gold medalist(s)	Ruslan Katyshev	Ukraine	12	8	6.46 (+2.2)	6.32 (+0.8)	6.06 (+0.2)	x (-0.9)	x (0.0)	6.42 (-0.1)	6.46	PB
2nd place, silver medalist(s)	Elexis Gillette	United States	1	6	5.98 (-0.9)	x (+0.8)	6.16 (+1.1)	x (+0.5)	6.34 (+2.6)	6.18 (+0.7)	6.34	
3rd place, bronze medalist(s)	Duan Li	China	11	7	x (-1.6)	6.11 (+1.0)	6.31 (+0.1)	6.19 (+0.4)	x (+2.4)	–	6.31	PB
4	Andrey Koptev	Russia	2	5	5.67 (+0.9)	6.08 (+0.9)	x (-0.2)	5.96 (+0.4)	6.29 (-0.5)	5.96 (-1.5)	6.29	PB
5	Xavier Porras	Spain	3	4	5.89 (+1.0)	x (+2.0)	5.70 (-0.3)	6.00 (-0.6)	5.91 (+0.3)	6.08 (-0.2)	6.08	
6	Firas Bentria	Algeria	10	3	5.73 (+1.8)	5.63 (+1.4)	5.71 (-0.8)	5.83 (+0.5)	5.50 (+0.5)	5.69 (+0.4)	5.83	RR
7	Rickard Straht	Sweden	5	2	5.56 (0.0)	5.67 (+0.8)	x (+1.5)	5.59 (+1.1)	5.41 (-1.1)	5.50 (-0.8)	5.67	
8	Martin Parejo Maza	Spain	7	1	5.32 (-0.3)	x (+1.6)	5.57 (+2.4)	5.40 (-1.2)	5.54 (+0.8)	5.61 (+1.0)	5.61	
9	Jakkit Punthong	Thailand	4	–	5.36 (+0.3)	5.47 (-0.3)	5.20 (+0.1)	–	–	–	5.47	
10	Athanasios Barakas	Greece	8	–	5.28 (-0.8)	5.18 (-1.2)	5.41 (-0.2)	–	–	–	5.41	
11	Tanner Gers	United States	6	–	5.24 (+0.7)	5.14 (+0,9)	4.64 (+0.3)	–	–	–	5.24	
12	Denis Gulin	Russia	9	–	x (-0.7)	5.18 (-1.4)	x (+1.2)	–	–	–	5.18	

- Note: Small number in brackets is wind speed in metres per second.

=== F13 ===
Rank	Athlete	Nationality	1	2	3	4	5	6	Best	Notes
1st place, gold medalist(s)	Luis Felipe Gutierrez	Cuba	7.49	X	7.54	7.47	X	X	7.54	PR
2nd place, silver medalist(s)	Angel Jimenez Cabeza	Cuba	X	7.06	6.90	7.09	7.07	7.14	7.14	PB
3rd place, bronze medalist(s)	Radoslav Zlatanov	Bulgaria	6.32	6.57	X	X	6.81	X	6.81	PB
4	Per Jonsson	Sweden	6.41	6.15	X	6.30	6.11	6.48	6.48	SB
5	Mohd Saifuddin Ishak	Malaysia	X	6.07	5.96	X	6.30	6.15	6.30	
6	Markeith Price	United States	X	6.17	6.09	5.90	6.05	6.05	6.17	
7	Biondi Miasi	Suriname	6.06	5.73	5.70	5.51	5.86	5.46	6.06	=PB
8	Ihar Fartunau	Belarus	5.84	X	5.99'	X	–	–	5.99	
9	Mohammed Fannouna	Palestine	5.75	5.93	5.80	–	–	–	5.93	
10	Tobias Jonsson	Sweden	3.61	5.83	5.79	–	–	–	5.83	
11	Abed Al Ramahi	Jordan	5.66	X	X	–	–	–	5.66	
12	Islam Salimov	Kazakhstan	5.58	5.60	5.64	–	–	–	5.64	
13	Edgars Klavins	Latvia	5.57	5.29	5.27	–	–	–	5.57	
14	Sohbet Charyyev	Turkmenistan	X	5.53	X	–	–	–	5.53	

=== F20 ===
Rank	Athlete	Nationality	1	2	3	4	5	6	Result	Notes
1st place, gold medalist(s)	José Expósito	Spain	6.65	x	7.25	x	6.86	x	7.25	PR
2nd place, silver medalist(s)	Zoran Talić	Croatia	7.00	x	x	6.91	x	7.09	7.09	
3rd place, bronze medalist(s)	Lenine Cunha	Portugal	6.95	x	x	6.94	6.90	x	6.95	PB
4	Leonid Ustyuzhanin	Russia	6.41	x	6.59	5.98	6.20	6.55	6.59	PB
5	Jacek Kolodziej	Poland	6.31	6.05	6.21	x	6.13	6.28	6.31	SB
6	Evangelos Kanavos	Greece	6.16	6.07	6.00	6.25	5.41	5.91	6.25	
7	Jose Ortiz	Venezuela	6.10	5.81	5.92	6.03	5.56	6.16	6.16	
8	Daniel Royer	France	x	x	5.37	5.75	5.59	5.48	5.75	
9	Hio Sam Tong	Macau	4.63	4.57	4.49				4.63	SB
10	Williams Barreto	Venezuela	3.97	x	x				3.97	SB

=== F36 ===
Rank	Athlete	Nationality	1	2	3	4	5	6	Best	Notes
1st place, gold medalist(s)	Roman Pavlyk	Ukraine	4.69	5.17	5.16	5.23	4.96	x	5.23	PB
2nd place, silver medalist(s)	Mariusz Sobczak	Poland	5.14	4.95	5.07	4.79	4.76	x	5.14	PB
3rd place, bronze medalist(s)	Vladimir Sviridov	Russia	x	4.93	4.88	5.08	4.85	5.06	5.08	SB
4	Marcin Mielczarek	Poland	4.73	4.92	4.65	5.05	5.06	5.07	5.07	=PB
5	Xu Ran	China	5.06	x	x	x	5.07	x	5.07	RR
6	Chris Clemens	United States	4.80	4.95	4.83	4.98	4.73	x	4.98	
7	Anastasios Petropoulos	Greece	4.42	4.90	4.38	x	x	4.68	4.90	=PB
8	Sergey Kharlamov	Kazakhstan	4.43	4.25	4.45	4.31	4.36	4.68	4.68	PB
9	Hasan Janabi	Iraq	4.31	4.40	4.33	-	-	-	4.40	SB

=== F37–38 ===
Rank	Athlete	Nationality	Class	1	2	3	4	5	6	Best	Score	Notes
1st place, gold medalist(s)	Gocha Khugaev	Russia	F37	6.23	6.00	5.98	6.28	6.31	6.12	6.31	1028	WR
2nd place, silver medalist(s)	Ma Yuxi	China	F37	5.98	x	6.10	6.17	5.95	6.26	6.26	1023	RR
3rd place, bronze medalist(s)	Dyan Buis	South Africa	F38	x	6.19	x	6.32	6.48	6.39	6.48	1021	=WR
4	Mohamed Farhat Chida	Tunisia	F38	6.01	6.01	6.06	6.01	6.21	6.36	6.36	1010	PB
5	Andrea Dalle Ave	South Africa	F37	6.02	5.82	x	5.79	5.78	5.54	6.02	992	RR
6	Andriy Onufriyenko	Ukraine	F38	5.35	5.46	6.09	5.97	5.07	5.56	6.09	978	=RR
7	Benjamin Ivan Cardozo Sanchez	Mexico	F37	3.69	5.34	x	5.63	5.62	5.71	5.71	941	RR
8	Vladislav Barinov	Russia	F37	5.40	5.60	5.58	5.67	5.44	5.42	5.67	934	SB
9	Dmitrijs Silovs	Latvia	F37	x	5.29	5.24	-	-	-	5.29	847	
10	Union Sekailwe	South Africa	F38	3.93	5.08	5.10	-	-	-	5.10	762	
-	Haider Ali	Pakistan	F38	x	x	x	-	-	-	NM		

=== F42–44 ===
Rank	Athlete	Nationality	Class	1	2	3	4	5	6	Best	Score	Notes
1st place, gold medalist(s)	Markus Rehm	Germany	F44	7.14	7.00	7.35	7.31	X	X	7.35	1093	WR
2nd place, silver medalist(s)	Wojtek Czyz	Germany	F42	6.13	6.33	6.27	6.30	6.22	6.30	6.33	983	PB
3rd place, bronze medalist(s)	Daniel Jørgensen	Denmark	F42	5.97	5.87	6.11	5.95	5.95	5.95	6.11	959	PB
4	Heinrich Popow	Germany	F42	6.01	6.07	5.97	5.91	5.33	5.57	6.07	954	SB
5	Atsushi Yamamoto	Japan	F42	5.14	5.84	5.95	3.84	X	5.83	5.95	937	RR
6	Qiuhong Wang	China	F44	6.21	5.74	6.27	X	X	X	6.27	788	RR
7	Jean-Baptiste Alaize	France	F44	6.15	X	6.19	6.04	5.98	5.88	6.19	762	
8	André Oliveira	Brazil	F44	6.12	X	X	5.84	X	5.71	6.12	739	SB
9	Dumeera Pituwala Kankanage	Sri Lanka	F44	5.54	5.56	5.36	–	–	–	5.56	554	
10	Helgi Sveinsson	Iceland	F42	4.25	3.66	3.95	–	–	–	4.25	400	
11	Weizhong Guo	China	F42	X	4.06	r	–	–	–	4.06	312	

=== F46 ===
Rank	Athlete	Nationality	1	2	3	4	5	6	Best	Notes
1st place, gold medalist(s)	Ming Davis	United States	6.45	X	6.78	7.12	7.15	7.09	7.15	RR
2nd place, silver medalist(s)	Arnaud Assoumani	France	6.93	6.86	6.94	7.06	7.13	7.05	7.13	SB
3rd place, bronze medalist(s)	Huseyn Hasanov	Azerbaijan	6.45	6.53	6.23	4.53	6.44	6.48	6.53	SB
4	Alain Akakpo	France	X	6.45	X	X	6.33	6.46	6.46	SB
5	Setiyo Budi Hartanto	Indonesia	6.12	6.19	6.44	6.20	6.00	6.11	6.44	PB
6	Jagseer Singh	India	X	6.42	6.33	X	X	X	6.42	
7	Eryanto Bahtiar	Malaysia	6.32	X	6.22	6.16	6.19	6.35	6.35	SB
8	Aliaksandr Subota	Belarus	5.89	5.96	5.71	6.04	6.02	6.06	6.06	
9	Hongjie Chen	China	5.93	5.70	5.93	–	–	–	5.93	SB
10	Tobi Fawehinmi	United States	X	X	5.17	–	–	–	5.17	
11	Florin Marius Cojoc	Romania	X	4.14	3.04	–	–	–	4.14	
