= Athletics at the 2012 Summer Paralympics – Women's long jump =

The Women's Long Jump athletics events for the 2012 Summer Paralympics took place at the London Olympic Stadium from August 31 to September 7, 2012. A total of 6 events were contested incorporating 9 different classifications.

== Schedule ==
Event↓/Date →	Fri 31	Sat 1	Sun 2	Mon 3	Tue 4	Wed 5	Thr 6	Fri 7
F11–12 Long Jump								F
F13 Long Jump								F
F20 Long Jump				F				
F37–38 Long Jump	F							
F42–44 Long Jump			F					
F46 Long Jump			F					

== Results ==
=== F11/12 ===
Rank	Athlete	Nationality	Class	1	2	3	4	5	6	Result	Score	Notes
1st place, gold medalist(s)	Oksana Zubkovska	Ukraine	F12	6.17	6.41	6.41	x		6.60	6.60	1065	WR
2nd place, silver medalist(s)	Jia Juntingxian	China	F11	4.73	x	4.26	4.58	x	4.57	4.73	930	RR
3rd place, bronze medalist(s)	Anna Kaniuk	Belarus	F12	5.34	5.83	x	5.78	5.67	5.73	5.83	889	=PB
4	Gabriela Gonzalez	Mexico	F11	4.03	4.38	4.07	4.06	x	3.96	4.38	856	PB
5	Sara Martinez	Spain	F12	5.55	5.43	5.25	5.29	5.40	5.66	5.66	844	PB
6	Shiho Watanabe	Japan	F11	4.01	3.97	3.99	4.00	4.22	3.92	4.22	815	
7	Volha Zinkevich	Belarus	F12	5.16	5.52	5.51	5.40	5.36	5.52	5.52	804	
8	Paraskevi Kantza	Greece	F11	x	3.77	3.97	x	3.90	x	3.97	740	
9	Liu Miaomiao	China	F12	5.15	5.19	5.11				5.19	705	SB
10	Alice Correa	Brazil	F12	4.61	4.47	x				4.61	519	PB

=== F13 ===
Rank	Athlete	Nationality	1	2	3	4	5	6	Result	Notes
1st place, gold medalist(s)	Ilse Hayes	South Africa	x	5.70	x	5.51	x	5.52	5.70	
2nd place, silver medalist(s)	Lynda Hamri	Algeria	x	5.31	5.28	5.22	5.23	5.17	5.31	PB
3rd place, bronze medalist(s)	Anthi Karagianni	Greece	x	5.09	5.16	4.78	4.88	5.09	5.16	
4	Iulia Korunchak	Ukraine	4.83	5.01	5.13	4.81	4.87	4.79	5.13	SB
5	Jessica Gallagher	Australia	4.82	4.92	5.03	x	4.90	4.82	5.03	
	Johanna Pretorius	South Africa							DNS	

=== F20 ===
Rank	Athlete	Nationality	1	2	3	4	5	6	Result	Notes
1st place, gold medalist(s)	Karolina Kucharczyk	Poland	5.78	5.80	5.93	5.79	6.00	5.64	6.00	WR
2nd place, silver medalist(s)	Krestina Zhukova	Russia	5.36	5.36	5.26	5.16	5.38	5.32	5.38	
3rd place, bronze medalist(s)	Mikela Ristoski	Croatia	5.14	5.07	5.28	4.75	5.27	5.15	5.28	
4	Stephanie Schweitzer	Australia	x	x	4.79	x	x	x	4.79	
5	Emma Eriksson	Sweden	4.78	4.42	4.13	4.45	4.41	4.32	4.78	PB
6	Raquel Cerqueira	Portugal	4.57	x	4.42	4.52	4.58	4.30	4.58	
7	Veronika Skuhrovska	Czech Republic	x	4.10	4.18	4.07	4.38	4.18	4.38	SB
	Rabia Benhaj Ahmed	Tunisia	x						NM	

=== F37/38 ===
Rank	Athlete	Nationality	Class	1	2	3	4	5	6	Result	Score	Notes
1st place, gold medalist(s)	Margarita Goncharova	Russia	F38	4.64	4.78	4.84	4.51	4.76	x	4.84	1009	PR
2nd place, silver medalist(s)	Inna Stryzhak	Ukraine	F38	4.79	4.68	x	4.57	4.38	x	4.79	1004	
3rd place, bronze medalist(s)	Cao Yuanhang	China	F37	4.40	4.25	4.24	x	4.06	4.16	4.40	993	PR
4	Ramunė Adomaitienė	Lithuania	F38	4.61	4.67	4.47	4.46	4.40	4.53	4.67	992	
5	Neda Bahi	Tunisia	F37	4.17	4.09	4.09	4.35	x	x	4.35	987	RR
6	Marta Langner	Poland	F37	4.20	x	x	x	4.15	4.10	4.20	965	
7	Heather Jameson	Ireland	F37	3.64	4.11	x	x	2.95	3.89	4.11	950	PB
8	Matthildur Þorsteinsdóttir	Iceland	F37	x	3.63	4.07	3.83	4.08	4.03	4.08	944	
9	Maike Hausberger	Germany	F37	3.88	3.84	x				3.88	900	
10	Johanna Benson	Namibia	F37	x	3.71	3.61				3.71	851	
11	Katy Parrish	Australia	F38	x	3.82	3.62				3.82	811	
12	Liene Grutzite	Latvia	F37	3.40	3.35	x				3.40	733	

=== F42/44 ===
Rank	Athlete	Nationality	Class	1	2	3	4	5	6	Result	Score	Notes
1st place, gold medalist(s)	Kelly Cartwright	Australia	F42	3.98	4.16	4.38	4.29	4.32	x	4.38	1030	WR
2nd place, silver medalist(s)	Stefanie Reid	Great Britain	F44	x	5.08	5.28	4.65	x	4.96	5.28	1023	PR
3rd place, bronze medalist(s)	Marie-Amélie Le Fur	France	F44	x	4.84	4.79	5.06	x	5.14	5.14	1010	
4	Iris Pruysen	Netherlands	F44	4.87	4.49	4.73	4.74	4.54	4.64	4.87	976	PB
5	Katrin Green	Germany	F44	4.75	4.57	4.85	4.35	x	4.55	4.85	973	SB
6	Vanessa Low	Germany	F42	x	3.69	3.88	3.91	3.47	3.93	3.93	968	
7	Wang Juan	China	F44	x	4.80	4.32	4.79	x	4.53	4.80	965	RR
8	Maya Nakanishi	Japan	F44	x	4.66	4.71	4.79	4.32	x	4.79	963	
9	Mami Sato	Japan	F44	4.70	x	x				4.70	947	PB
10	Suzan Verduijn	Netherlands	F44	4.48	4.49	4.53				4.53	912	
11	Marije Smits	Netherlands	F42	x	3.59	3.52				3.59	881	
12	Ewa Zielińska	Poland	F42	3.38	3.48	3.50				3.50	849	SB
13	Martina Caironi	Italy	F42	3.18	x	3.50				3.50	849	
14	Jana Schmidt	Germany	F42	3.42	x	x				3.42	818	
15	Saki Takakuwa	Japan	F44	3.84	3.91	3.88				3.91	707	

=== F46 ===
Rank	Athlete	Nationality	1	2	3	4	5	6	Result	Notes
1st place, gold medalist(s)	Nikol Rodomakina	Russia	5.63	5.60	5.50	5.62	5.40	5.63	5.63	SB
2nd place, silver medalist(s)	Carlee Beattie	Australia	x	x	5.34	x	5.38	5.57	5.57	
3rd place, bronze medalist(s)	Ouyang Jingling	China	5.20	5.41	5.33	5.25	5.32	5.34	5.41	RR
4	Sheila Finder	Brazil	5.03	5.07	4.99	4.92	4.79	4.87	5.07	
5	Lenka Gajarská	Slovakia	4.68	4.70	x	4.49	4.67	x	4.70	=SB
6	Styliani Smaragdi	Greece	4.55	x	4.52	4.68	4.57	4.47	4.68	
