= Athletics at the 2012 Summer Paralympics – Men's triple jump =

The Men's Triple Jump athletics events for the 2012 Summer Paralympics took place at the London Olympic Stadium from August 31 to September 8. A total of 3 events were contested over this distance for 3 different classifications.

== Schedule ==
Event↓/Date →	Fri 31	Sat 1	Sun 2	Mon 3	Tue 4	Wed 5	Thr 6	Fri 7	Sat 8
F11 Triple Jump							F		
F12 Triple Jump									F
F46 Triple Jump		F							

== Results ==
=== F11 ===
Rank	Athlete	Nationality	1	2	3	4	5	6	Best	Notes
1st place, gold medalist(s)	Denis Gulin	Russia	X	11.48	12.91	12.58	12.81	X	12.91	
2nd place, silver medalist(s)	Li Duan	China	12.62	12.61	12.48	X	12.75	X	12.75	SB
3rd place, bronze medalist(s)	Ruslan Katyshev	Ukraine	11.71	12.11	X	12.50	12.21	11.76	12.50	PB
4	Elexis Gillette	United States	X	12.29	12.39	12.19	X	12.37	12.39	SB
5	Xavier Porras	Spain	12.19	11.88	11.59	11.89	11.91	X	12.19	
6	Athanasios Barakas	Greece	11.18	11.49	11.67	X	11.52	11.23	11.67	SB
7	Óscar David Herrera	Venezuela	11.34	X	X	11.19	X	11.19	11.34	PB
8	Miran Sahatov	Uzbekistan	11.07	X	X	X	10.78	X	11.07	PB
9	Luciano dos Santos Pereira	Brazil	X	X	11.02	X	X	X	11.02	
10	Martin Parejo Maza	Spain	10.94	10.51	10.87	X	X	X	10.94	SB
–	Andrey Koptev	Russia	–	–	–	–	–	–	–	DNS

=== F12 ===
Rank	Athlete	Nationality	1	2	3	4	5	6	Best	Notes
1st place, gold medalist(s)	Oleg Panyutin	Azerbaijan	15.02	14.25	14.02	x	x	x	15.02	SB
2nd place, silver medalist(s)	Vladimir Zayets	Azerbaijan	14.31	15.01	14.35	14.98	14.59	14.81	15.01	
3rd place, bronze medalist(s)	Dong Hewei	China	13.85	14.20	x	x	12.38	13.76	14.20	PB
4	Siarhei Burdukou	Belarus	13.59	x	13.64	13.80	x	14.19	14.19	PB
5	Osamah Masaud Al Shanqiti	Saudi Arabia	x	x	14.10	x	13.32	13.44	14.10	SB
6	Evgeny Kegelev	Russia	13.40	13.67	13.66	13.41	13.79	13.87	13.87	PB
7	Doniyor Saliev	Uzbekistan	13.81	13.64	13.56	x	13.53	13.53	13.81	
8	Liang Keng-chin	Chinese Taipei	13.20	13.60	13.54	13.47	13.37	13.30	13.60	PB
9	Sergii Mykhailov	Ukraine	12.14	x	12.96	-	-	-	12.96	
-	Ivan Kytsenko	Ukraine	x	x	x	-	-	-	NM	

=== F46 ===
Rank	Athlete	Nationality	1	2	3	4	5	6	Best	Notes
1st place, gold medalist(s)	Liu Fuliang	China	15.15	X	X	14.27	15.20	14.44	15.20	WR
2nd place, silver medalist(s)	Arnaud Assoumani	France	X	X	13.78	X	13.56	14.28	14.28	RR
3rd place, bronze medalist(s)	Aliaksandr Subota	Belarus	13.50	13.66	13.56	13.89	14.00	14.00	14.00	PB
4	Huseyn Hasanov	Azerbaijan	13.74	13.32	13.29	13.51	13.52	13.46	13.74	SB
5	Tobi Fawehinmi	United States	13.58	X	X	X	X	X	13.58	RR
6	Eryanto Bahtiar	Malaysia	13.45	X	13.23	13.28	13.02	X	13.45	PB
7	Setiyo Budi Hartanto	Indonesia	13.41	12.90	13.13	X	12.81	–	13.41	PB
8	Antonio Andujar Arroyo	Spain	13.19	X	13.38	X	X	X	13.38	SB
