= Athletics at the 2012 Summer Paralympics – Men's 800 metres T53 =

Men's 800 metres T53 at the XIV Paralympic Games
- Venue: London Olympic Stadium
- Dates: 4 to 5 September
- Competitors: 14 from 10 nations
- Winning time: 1:41.13

Medalists
1st place, gold medalist(s)		Richard Colman	Australia
2nd place, silver medalist(s)		Brent Lakatos	Canada
3rd place, bronze medalist(s)		Joshua George	United States

Athletics at the 2012 Summer Paralympics
Classification
T/F11–13: Blind and visually impaired
T/F20: Intellectual disability
T/F31–38: Cerebral palsy
F40: Les Autres
T/F42–46: Amputees
T/F51–58: Spinal cord disability
Men T/F51–58
Track
100 m	T51	T52	T53	T54
200 m	T52	T53
400 m	T52	T53	T54
800 m	T52	T53	T54
1500 m	T54
5000 m	T54
4×400 m relay	T53-54
Road
Marathon	T54
Field
Shot put	F52-3	F54-6
F57-8
Club throw	F31-32/51
Discus throw	F51-3	F54-6
F57-8
Javelin throw	F52-3	F54-6
F57-8
Women T/F51–58
Track
100 m	T52	T53	T54
200 m	T52	T53
400 m	T53	T54
800 m	T53	T54
1500 m	T54
5000 m	T54
Road
Marathon	T54
Field
Shot put	F54-6
F57-8
Club throw	F31-32/51
Discus throw	F51-3
F57-8
Javelin throw	F33-34/52-53	F54-6
F57-8

The Men's 800 metres T53 event at the 2012 Summer Paralympics took place at the London Olympic Stadium from 4 to 5 September.

The T53 category is for wheelchair athletes with normal use of arms and hands, no or limited trunk function, and no leg function.

== Records ==
Prior to the competition, the existing World and Paralympic records were as follows:

World & Paralympic record	Li Huzhao (CHN)	1:36.30	15 September 2008	Beijing, China

== Results ==
=== Round 1 ===
Competed 4 September 2012 from 12:54. Qual. rule: first 3 in each heat (Q) plus the 2 fastest other times (q) qualified.

==== Heat 1 ====
Rank	Athlete	Country	Time	Notes
1	Richard Colman	Australia	1:41.86	Q
2	Yoo Byunghoon	South Korea	1:42.20	Q, SB
3	Brent Lakatos	Canada	1:42.22	Q, PB
4	Joshua George	United States	1:42.32	q
5	Jun Hiromichi	Japan	1:42.42	q
6	Zhao Yufei	China	1:42.75	PB
7	Zach Abbott	United States	1:45.95	PB

==== Heat 2 ====
Rank	Athlete	Country	Time	Notes
1	Li Huzhao	China	1:46.08	Q
2	Brian Siemann	United States	1:46.38	Q
3	Pierre Fairbank	France	1:46.47	Q
4	Jesus Aguilar	Venezuela	1:46.84	
5	Roger Puigbo Verdaguer	Spain	1:47.90	
6	Hitoshi Matsunaga	Japan	1:48.38	
7	Jaime Ramirez Valencia	Mexico	1:50.37	

=== Final ===
Competed 5 September 2012 at 19:43.

Rank	Athlete	Country	Time	Notes
1st place, gold medalist(s)	Richard Colman	Australia	1:41.13	
2nd place, silver medalist(s)	Brent Lakatos	Canada	1:41.24	PB
3rd place, bronze medalist(s)	Joshua George	United States	1:41.50	
4	Li Huzhao	China	1:41.83	
5	Yoo Byunghoon	South Korea	1:42.44	
6	Jun Hiromichi	Japan	1:42.99	
7	Pierre Fairbank	France	1:43.02	
8	Brian Siemann	United States	1:43.09	

Q = qualified by place. q = qualified by time. PB = Personal Best. SB = Seasonal Best.
