= Athletics at the 2012 Summer Paralympics – Women's 400 metres T54 =

Women's 400 metres T54 at the XIV Paralympic Games
- Venue: London Olympic Stadium
- Dates: 3 September
- Competitors: 14 from 9 nations
- Winning time: 52.97

Medalists
1st place, gold medalist(s)		Tatyana McFadden	United States
2nd place, silver medalist(s)		Dong Hongjiao	China
3rd place, bronze medalist(s)		Edith Wolf	Switzerland

Athletics at the 2012 Summer Paralympics
Classification
T/F11–13: Blind and visually impaired
T/F20: Intellectual disability
T/F31–38: Cerebral palsy
F40: Les Autres
T/F42–46: Amputees
T/F51–58: Spinal cord disability
Men T/F51–58
Track
100 m	T51	T52	T53	T54
200 m	T52	T53
400 m	T52	T53	T54
800 m	T52	T53	T54
1500 m	T54
5000 m	T54
4×400 m relay	T53-54
Road
Marathon	T54
Field
Shot put	F52-3	F54-6
F57-8
Club throw	F31-32/51
Discus throw	F51-3	F54-6
F57-8
Javelin throw	F52-3	F54-6
F57-8
Women T/F51–58
Track
100 m	T52	T53	T54
200 m	T52	T53
400 m	T53	T54
800 m	T53	T54
1500 m	T54
5000 m	T54
Road
Marathon	T54
Field
Shot put	F54-6
F57-8
Club throw	F31-32/51
Discus throw	F51-3
F57-8
Javelin throw	F33-34/52-53	F54-6
F57-8

The Women's 400 metres T54 event at the 2012 Summer Paralympics took place at the London Olympic Stadium on 3 September. The event consisted of 2 heats and a final.

The T54 category is for wheelchair athletes with no leg function, but near full arm function and reasonable to normal trunk function. Typically this may be caused by a lower spinal cord injury or spinal cord birth defect.

== Records ==
Prior to the competition, the existing World and Paralympic records were as follows:

World & Paralympic record	Chantal Petitclerc (CAN)	51.91	25 September 2004	Athens, Greece

== Results ==
=== Round 1 ===
Competed 3 September 2012 from 11:18. Qual. rule: first 3 in each heat (Q) plus the 2 fastest other times (q) qualified.

==== Heat 1 ====
Rank	Athlete	Country	Time	Notes
1	Zou Lihong	China	56.23	Q, PB
2	Diane Roy	Canada	57.11	Q
3	Amanda Kotaja	Finland	58.06	Q, PB
4	Gunilla Wallengren	Sweden	58.24	q, SB
5	Christina Schwab	United States	59.06	
6	Jade Jones	Great Britain	59.14	
7	Patricia Keller	Switzerland	1:01.74	SB

==== Heat 2 ====
Rank	Athlete	Country	Time	Notes
1	Tatyana McFadden	United States	53.95	Q, PB
2	Dong Hongjiao	China	56.19	Q, PB
3	Edith Wolf	Switzerland	56.35	Q, SB
4	Manuela Schaer	Switzerland	57.47	q
5	Amberlynn Weber	United States	1:02.28	
6	Marianne Maiboll	Denmark	1:02.35	SB
7	Yazmith Bataz	Mexico	1:04.81	

=== Final ===
Competed 3 September 2012 at 20:54.

Rank	Athlete	Country	Time	Notes
1st place, gold medalist(s)	Tatyana McFadden	United States	52.97	PB
2nd place, silver medalist(s)	Dong Hongjiao	China	55.43	RR
3rd place, bronze medalist(s)	Edith Wolf	Switzerland	56.25	SB
4	Zou Lihong	China	56.57	
5	Diane Roy	Canada	56.60	
6	Amanda Kotaja	Finland	57.35	PB
7	Manuela Schaer	Switzerland	57.57	
8	Gunilla Wallengren	Sweden	58.74	

Q = qualified by place. q = qualified by time. RR = Regional Record. PB = Personal Best. SB = Seasonal Best.
