= Athletics at the 2012 Summer Paralympics – Women's 800 metres T54 =

Women's 800 metres T54 at the XIV Paralympic Games
- Venue: London Olympic Stadium
- Dates: 4 to 5 September
- Competitors: 20 from 12 nations
- Winning time: 1:47.01

Medalists
1st place, gold medalist(s)		Tatyana McFadden	United States
2nd place, silver medalist(s)		Edith Wolf	Switzerland
3rd place, bronze medalist(s)		Zou Lihong	China

Athletics at the 2012 Summer Paralympics
Classification
T/F11–13: Blind and visually impaired
T/F20: Intellectual disability
T/F31–38: Cerebral palsy
F40: Les Autres
T/F42–46: Amputees
T/F51–58: Spinal cord disability
Men T/F51–58
Track
100 m	T51	T52	T53	T54
200 m	T52	T53
400 m	T52	T53	T54
800 m	T52	T53	T54
1500 m	T54
5000 m	T54
4×400 m relay	T53-54
Road
Marathon	T54
Field
Shot put	F52-3	F54-6
F57-8
Club throw	F31-32/51
Discus throw	F51-3	F54-6
F57-8
Javelin throw	F52-3	F54-6
F57-8
Women T/F51–58
Track
100 m	T52	T53	T54
200 m	T52	T53
400 m	T53	T54
800 m	T53	T54
1500 m	T54
5000 m	T54
Road
Marathon	T54
Field
Shot put	F54-6
F57-8
Club throw	F31-32/51
Discus throw	F51-3
F57-8
Javelin throw	F33-34/52-53	F54-6
F57-8

The Women's 800 metres T54 event at the 2012 Summer Paralympics took place at the London Olympic Stadium from 4 to 5 September. The event consisted of 3 heats and a final.

The T54 category is for wheelchair athletes with no leg function, but near full arm function and reasonable to normal trunk function. Typically this may be caused by a lower spinal cord injury or spinal cord birth defect.

== Records ==
Prior to the competition, the existing World and Paralympic records were as follows:

World & Paralympic record	Chantal Petitclerc (CAN)	1:45.19	14 September 2008	Beijing, China

== Results ==
=== Round 1 ===
Competed 4 September 2012 from 10:12. Qual. rule: winner of each heat (Q) plus best second place (q) qualified.

==== Heat 1 ====
Rank	Athlete	Country	Time	Notes
1	Tatyana McFadden	United States	1:47.66	Q
2	Liu Wenjun	China	1:48.49	Q, RR
3	Diane Roy	Canada	1:55.95	q
4	Christie Dawes	Australia	1:56.14	q, SB
5	Jade Jones	Great Britain	1:56.16	
6	Alexandra Helbling	Switzerland	1:56.49	
7	Isatou Nyang	The Gambia	DQ	

==== Heat 2 ====
Rank	Athlete	Country	Time	Notes
1	Zou Lihong	China	1:56.36	Q
2	Manuela Schaer	Switzerland	1:56.60	Q
3	Gunilla Wallengren	Sweden	1:57.14	
4	Keira-Lyn Frie	Canada	1:57.23	
5	Christina Schwab	United States	1:57.51	
6	Amanda Kotaja	Finland	2:00.73	PB
7	Patricia Mustapha	Mauritius	DQ	

==== Heat 3 ====
Rank	Athlete	Country	Time	Notes
1	Edith Wolf	Switzerland	1:53.13	Q
2	Dong Hongjiao	China	1:55.92	Q
3	Shelly Woods	Great Britain	1:56.39	
4	Marianne Maiboll	Denmark	2:06.88	
5	Yazmith Bataz	Mexico	2:06.97	
6	Amberlynn Weber	United States	2:07.99	

=== Final ===
Competed 5 September 2012 at 21:44.

Rank	Athlete	Country	Time	Notes
1st place, gold medalist(s)	Tatyana McFadden	United States	1:47.01	
2nd place, silver medalist(s)	Edith Wolf	Switzerland	1:49.87	SB
3rd place, bronze medalist(s)	Zou Lihong	China	1:50.31	PB
4	Dong Hongjiao	China	1:50.62	PB
5	Manuela Schaer	Switzerland	1:50.90	
6	Liu Wenjun	China	1:51.34	
7	Diane Roy	Canada	1:54.90	
8	Christie Dawes	Australia	1:58.77	

Q = qualified by place. q = qualified by time. RR = Regional Record. PB = Personal Best. SB = Seasonal Best.
