= Athletics at the 2012 Summer Paralympics – Women's 100 metres T54 =

Women's 100 metres T54 at the XIV Paralympic Games
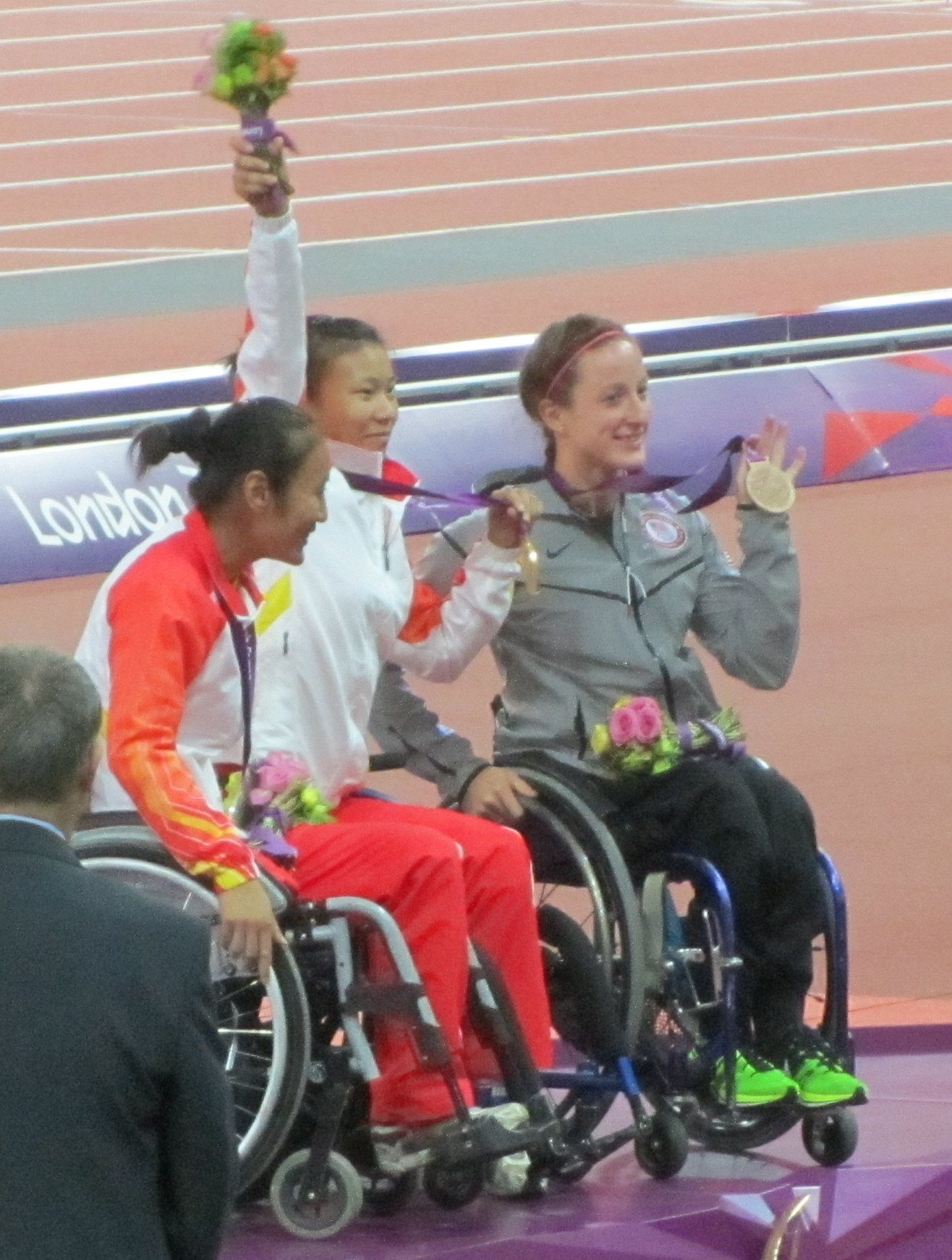
- Women's 100m T54 Victory Ceremony
- Venue: London Olympic Stadium
- Dates: 8 September
- Competitors: 13 from 8 nations

Medalists
1st place, gold medalist(s)		Liu Wenjun	China
2nd place, silver medalist(s)		Dong Hongjiao	China
3rd place, bronze medalist(s)		Tatyana McFadden	United States

Athletics at the 2012 Summer Paralympics
Classification
T/F11–13: Blind and visually impaired
T/F20: Intellectual disability
T/F31–38: Cerebral palsy
F40: Les Autres
T/F42–46: Amputees
T/F51–58: Spinal cord disability
Men T/F51–58
Track
100 m	T51	T52	T53	T54
200 m	T52	T53
400 m	T52	T53	T54
800 m	T52	T53	T54
1500 m	T54
5000 m	T54
4×400 m relay	T53-54
Road
Marathon	T54
Field
Shot put	F52-3	F54-6
F57-8
Club throw	F31-32/51
Discus throw	F51-3	F54-6
F57-8
Javelin throw	F52-3	F54-6
F57-8
Women T/F51–58
Track
100 m	T52	T53	T54
200 m	T52	T53
400 m	T53	T54
800 m	T53	T54
1500 m	T54
5000 m	T54
Road
Marathon	T54
Field
Shot put	F54-6
F57-8
Club throw	F31-32/51
Discus throw	F51-3
F57-8
Javelin throw	F33-34/52-53	F54-6
F57-8

The Women's 100 metres T54 event at the 2012 Summer Paralympics took place at the London Olympic Stadium on 8 September.

The T54 category is for wheelchair athletes with no leg function, but near full arm function and reasonable to normal trunk function. Typically this may be caused by a lower spinal cord injury or spinal cord birth defect.

Broken records during the 2012 Summer Paralympics
World record	Liu Wenjun (CHN)	15.82	London, United Kingdom	8 September 2012

== Results ==
=== Round 1 ===
Competed 8 September 2012 from 19:00. Qual. rule: first 3 in each heat (Q) plus the 2 fastest other times (q) qualified.

==== Heat 1 ====
Rank	Athlete	Country	Time	Notes
1	Dong Hongjiao	China	16.21	Q, PB
2	Amanda Kotaja	Finland	16.45	Q, PB
3	Manuela Schaer	Switzerland	16.92	Q
4	Hannah McFadden	United States	18.23	q
5	Amberlynn Weber	United States	18.48	
6	Isatou Nyang	The Gambia	20.32	SB
			Wind: -0.1 m/s	

==== Heat 2 ====
Rank	Athlete	Country	Time	Notes
1	Liu Wenjun	China	16.10	Q, RR
2	Tatyana McFadden	United States	16.53	Q
3	Keira-Lyn Frie	Canada	17.54	Q
4	Yazmith Bataz	Mexico	18.40	q
5	Alexandra Helbling	Switzerland	18.53	SB
6	Marianne Maiboll	Denmark	19.07	
7	Dedeline Mibamba Kimbata	Democratic Republic of the Congo	23.08	
			Wind: -0.1 m/s	

=== Final ===
Competed 8 September 2012 at 11:33.

Rank	Athlete	Country	Time	Notes
1st place, gold medalist(s)	Liu Wenjun	China	15.82	WR
2nd place, silver medalist(s)	Dong Hongjiao	China	15.86	PB
3rd place, bronze medalist(s)	Tatyana McFadden	United States	16.15	
4	Amanda Kotaja	Finland	16.29	RR
5	Manuela Schaer	Switzerland	16.76	
6	Keira-Lyn Frie	Canada	17.26	
7	Yazmith Bataz	Mexico	17.93	
8	Hannah McFadden	United States	18.02	
			Wind: +0.5 m/s	

Q = qualified by place. q = qualified by time. WR = World Record. RR = Regional Record. PB = Personal Best. SB = Seasonal Best.
