= Athletics at the 2012 Summer Paralympics – Men's 1500 metres T54 =

Men's 1500 metres T54 at the XIV Paralympic Games
- Venue: London Olympic Stadium
- Dates: 3 to 4 September
- Competitors: 21 from 14 nations
- Winning time: 3:12.09

Medalists
1st place, gold medalist(s)		David Weir	Great Britain
2nd place, silver medalist(s)		Prawat Wahoram	Thailand
3rd place, bronze medalist(s)		Kim Gyu Dae	South Korea

Athletics at the 2012 Summer Paralympics
Classification
T/F11–13: Blind and visually impaired
T/F20: Intellectual disability
T/F31–38: Cerebral palsy
F40: Les Autres
T/F42–46: Amputees
T/F51–58: Spinal cord disability
Men T/F51–58
Track
100 m	T51	T52	T53	T54
200 m	T52	T53
400 m	T52	T53	T54
800 m	T52	T53	T54
1500 m	T54
5000 m	T54
4×400 m relay	T53-54
Road
Marathon	T54
Field
Shot put	F52-3	F54-6
F57-8
Club throw	F31-32/51
Discus throw	F51-3	F54-6
F57-8
Javelin throw	F52-3	F54-6
F57-8
Women T/F51–58
Track
100 m	T52	T53	T54
200 m	T52	T53
400 m	T53	T54
800 m	T53	T54
1500 m	T54
5000 m	T54
Road
Marathon	T54
Field
Shot put	F54-6
F57-8
Club throw	F31-32/51
Discus throw	F51-3
F57-8
Javelin throw	F33-34/52-53	F54-6
F57-8

The Men's 1500 metres T54 event at the 2012 Summer Paralympics took place at the London Olympic Stadium from 3 to 4 September.

The T54 category is for wheelchair athletes with no leg function, but near full arm function and reasonable to normal trunk function. Typically this may be caused by a lower spinal cord injury or spinal cord birth defect.

== Records ==
Prior to the competition, the existing World and Paralympic records were as follows:

World record	David Weir (GBR)	2:55.72	29 June 2007	Atlanta, United States
Paralympic record	Prawat Wahorum (THA)	3:00.10	15 September 2008	Beijing, China

== Results ==
=== Round 1 ===
Competed 3 September 2012 from 10:40. Qual. rule: first 3 in each heat (Q) plus the 2 fastest other times (q) qualified.

==== Heat 1 ====
Rank	Athlete	Country	Time	Notes
1	Marcel Hug	Switzerland	3:11.17	Q
2	Prawat Wahoram	Thailand	3:11.31	Q
3	David Weir	Great Britain	3:11.35	Q
4	Zhang Lixin	China	3:11.40	q
5	Mohammad Vahdani	United Arab Emirates	3:13.58	
6	Hiroyuki Yamamoto	Japan	3:14.36	
7	Aaron Pike	United States	3:15.04	

==== Heat 2 ====
Rank	Athlete	Country	Time	Notes
1	Kurt Fearnley	Australia	3:19.18	Q
2	Liu Chengming	China	3:19.35	Q
3	Josh Cassidy	Canada	3:19.54	Q
4	Hong Sukman	South Korea	3:19.72	
5	Nobukazu Hanaoka	Japan	3:19.84	
6	Ahmed Aouadi	Tunisia	3:20.35	
7	Tomasz Hamerlak	Poland	3:20.42	

==== Heat 3 ====
Rank	Athlete	Country	Time	Notes
1	Saichon Konjen	Thailand	3:14.81	Q
2	Kim Gyu Dae	South Korea	3:14.90	Q
3	Liu Yang	China	3:15.07	Q
4	Julien Casoli	France	3:15.18	
5	Joshua George	United States	3:15.76	
6	Masazumi Soejima	Japan	3:17.11	
7	Fernando Sanchez Nava	Mexico	3:17.16	

=== Final ===
Competed 4 September 2012 at 21:37.

Rank	Athlete	Country	Time	Notes
1st place, gold medalist(s)	David Weir	Great Britain	3:12.09	
2nd place, silver medalist(s)	Prawat Wahoram	Thailand	3:12.32	
3rd place, bronze medalist(s)	Kim Gyu Dae	South Korea	3:12.57	
4	Marcel Hug	Switzerland	3:12.76	
5	Saichon Konjen	Thailand	3:12.84	
6	Liu Chengming	China	3:12.86	
7	Kurt Fearnley	Australia	3:13.23	
8	Liu Yang	China	3:13.63	
9	Zhang Lixin	China	3:14.05	
10	Josh Cassidy	Canada	3:14.70	

Q = qualified by place. q = qualified by time.
