= Athletics at the 2012 Summer Paralympics – Women's 5000 metres =

Women's 5000 metres T54 at the XIV Paralympic Games
- Venue: London Olympic Stadium
- Dates: 31 August to 2 September
- Competitors: 13 from 7 nations
- Winning time: 12:27.87

Medalists
1st place, gold medalist(s)		Edith Wolf	Switzerland
2nd place, silver medalist(s)		Shirley Reilly	United States
3rd place, bronze medalist(s)		Christie Dawes	Australia

Athletics at the 2012 Summer Paralympics
Classification
T/F11–13: Blind and visually impaired
T/F20: Intellectual disability
T/F31–38: Cerebral palsy
F40: Les Autres
T/F42–46: Amputees
T/F51–58: Spinal cord disability
Men T/F51–58
Track
100 m	T51	T52	T53	T54
200 m	T52	T53
400 m	T52	T53	T54
800 m	T52	T53	T54
1500 m	T54
5000 m	T54
4×400 m relay	T53-54
Road
Marathon	T54
Field
Shot put	F52-3	F54-6
F57-8
Club throw	F31-32/51
Discus throw	F51-3	F54-6
F57-8
Javelin throw	F52-3	F54-6
F57-8
Women T/F51–58
Track
100 m	T52	T53	T54
200 m	T52	T53
400 m	T53	T54
800 m	T53	T54
1500 m	T54
5000 m	T54
Road
Marathon	T54
Field
Shot put	F54-6
F57-8
Club throw	F31-32/51
Discus throw	F51-3
F57-8
Javelin throw	F33-34/52-53	F54-6
F57-8

The Women's 5000m athletic event for the 2012 Summer Paralympics took place at the London Olympic Stadium on 2 September 2012. The event, open to T53 and T54 wheelchair athletes, consisted of 2 heats and a final.

== Results ==
The event was won by Swiss athlete Edith Wolf, beating American Shirley Reilly, who won the silver medal, and Australian Christie Dawes, who claimed the bronze medal.

== Records ==
Prior to the competition, the existing World and Paralympic records were as follows:

World record	Amanda McGrory (USA)	11:39.43	29 June 2007	Atlanta, United States
Paralympic record	Wakako Tsuchida (JPN)	11:59.51	21 September 2004	Athens, Greece

== Results ==
=== Round 1 ===
Competed 31 August 2012 from 10:15. Qual. rule: first 3 in each heat (Q) plus the 4 fastest other times (q) qualified.

==== Heat 1 ====
Rank	Athlete	Country	Class	Time	Notes
1	Amanda McGrory	United States	T53	13:11.78	Q
2	Liu Wenjun	China	T54	13:12.11	Q
3	Shelly Woods	Great Britain	T54	13:12.25	Q
4	Keira-Lyn Frie	Canada	T54	13:12.45	q
5	Sandra Graf	Switzerland	T54	13:12.82	
6	Christina Schwab	United States	T54	13:33.30	

==== Heat 2 ====
Rank	Athlete	Country	Class	Time	Notes
1	Edith Wolf	Switzerland	T54	12:23.61	Q
2	Diane Roy	Canada	T54	12:24.48	Q
3	Wakako Tsuchida	Japan	T54	12:24.73	Q
4	Patricia Keller	Switzerland	T54	12:51.49	q
5	Christie Dawes	Australia	T54	12:51.77	q
6	Shirley Reilly	United States	T53	13:09.26	q
7	Zou Lihong	China	T54	DNF	

=== Final ===
Competed 2 September 2012 at 10:37.

Rank	Athlete	Country	Class	Time	Notes
1st place, gold medalist(s)	Edith Wolf	Switzerland	T54	12:27.87	
2nd place, silver medalist(s)	Shirley Reilly	United States	T53	12:27.91	
3rd place, bronze medalist(s)	Christie Dawes	Australia	T54	12:28.24	
4	Keira-Lyn Frie	Canada	T54	12:28.86	
5	Liu Wenjun	China	T54	12:28.93	
6	Wakako Tsuchida	Japan	T54	12:29.05	
7	Amanda McGrory	United States	T53	12:29.07	
8	Shelly Woods	Great Britain	T54	12:29.26	
9	Diane Roy	Canada	T54	12:29.27	
10	Patricia Keller	Switzerland	T54	12:29.38	

Q = qualified by place. q = qualified by time. DNF = Did not finish.
