= Athletics at the 2012 Summer Paralympics – Men's 5000 metres T54 =

Men's 5000 metres T54 at the XIV Paralympic Games
- Venue: London Olympic Stadium
- Dates: 31 August to 2 September
- Competitors: 25 from 14 nations
- Winning time: 11:07.65

Medalists
1st place, gold medalist(s)		David Weir	Great Britain
2nd place, silver medalist(s)		Kurt Fearnley	Australia
3rd place, bronze medalist(s)		Julien Casoli	France

Athletics at the 2012 Summer Paralympics
Classification
T/F11–13: Blind and visually impaired
T/F20: Intellectual disability
T/F31–38: Cerebral palsy
F40: Les Autres
T/F42–46: Amputees
T/F51–58: Spinal cord disability
Men T/F51–58
Track
100 m	T51	T52	T53	T54
200 m	T52	T53
400 m	T52	T53	T54
800 m	T52	T53	T54
1500 m	T54
5000 m	T54
4×400 m relay	T53-54
Road
Marathon	T54
Field
Shot put	F52-3	F54-6
F57-8
Club throw	F31-32/51
Discus throw	F51-3	F54-6
F57-8
Javelin throw	F52-3	F54-6
F57-8
Women T/F51–58
Track
100 m	T52	T53	T54
200 m	T52	T53
400 m	T53	T54
800 m	T53	T54
1500 m	T54
5000 m	T54
Road
Marathon	T54
Field
Shot put	F54-6
F57-8
Club throw	F31-32/51
Discus throw	F51-3
F57-8
Javelin throw	F33-34/52-53	F54-6
F57-8

The Men's 5000 metres T54 event at the 2012 Summer Paralympics took place at the London Olympic Stadium from 31 August to 2 September.

The T54 category is for wheelchair athletes with no leg function, but near full arm function and reasonable to normal trunk function. Typically this may be caused by a lower spinal cord injury or spinal cord birth defect.

== Records ==
Prior to the competition, the existing World and Paralympic records were as follows:

World record	David Weir (GBR)	9:54.82	30 June 2007	Atlanta, United States
Paralympic record	Kurt Fearnley (AUS)	10:13.21	8 September 2008	Beijing, China

== Results ==
=== Round 1 ===
Competed 31 August 2012 from 19:15. Qual. rule: first 3 in each heat (Q) plus the best fourth place (q) qualified.

==== Heat 1 ====
Rank	Athlete	Country	Time	Notes
1	Julien Casoli	France	10:56.53	Q
2	Kurt Fearnley	Australia	10:56.58	Q
3	Prawat Wahoram	Thailand	10:56.74	Q
4	Kim Gyu Dae	South Korea	10:56.94	q
5	Jun Hiromichi	Japan	10:57.54	
6	Roger Puigbo Verdaguer	Spain	10:57.60	
7	Martin Velasco Soria	Mexico	10:58.97	
8	Adam Bleakney	United States	11:48.00	

==== Heat 2 ====
Rank	Athlete	Country	Time	Notes
1	Marcel Hug	Switzerland	11:31.78	Q
2	Hiroyuki Yamamoto	Japan	11:32.16	Q
3	Aaron Gordian Martinez	Mexico	11:32.27	Q
4	Josh Cassidy	Canada	11:32.47	
5	Alain Fuss	France	11:32.90	
6	Natheniel Arkley	Australia	11:33.18	
7	Aaron Pike	United States	11:33.74	
8	Rafael Botello Jimenez	Spain	11:33.80	

==== Heat 3 ====
Rank	Athlete	Country	Time	Notes
1	David Weir	Great Britain	11:28.88	Q
2	Liu Chengming	China	11:29.06	Q
3	Hong Sukman	South Korea	11:29.32	Q
4	Mohammad Vahdani	United Arab Emirates	11:29.84	
5	Tomasz Hamerlak	Poland	11:30.69	
6	Kota Hokinoue	Japan	11:30.77	
7	Krige Schabort	United States	11:30.85	
8	Denis Lemeunier	France	11:30.95	
9	Alexandre Dupont	Canada	11:31.10	

=== Final ===
Competed 2 September 2012 at 21:49.

Rank	Athlete	Country	Time	Notes
1st place, gold medalist(s)	David Weir	Great Britain	11:07.65	
2nd place, silver medalist(s)	Kurt Fearnley	Australia	11:07.90	
3rd place, bronze medalist(s)	Julien Casoli	France	11:08.07	
4	Marcel Hug	Switzerland	11:08.16	
5	Prawat Wahoram	Thailand	11:08.55	
6	Kim Gyu Dae	South Korea	11:08.95	
7	Aaron Gordian Martinez	Mexico	11:09.54	
8	Liu Chengming	China	11:09.65	
9	Hong Sukman	South Korea	11:10.23	
10	Hiroyuki Yamamoto	Japan	11:10.78	

Q = qualified by place. q = qualified by time.
