= Athletics at the 2012 Summer Paralympics – Men's 400 metres T52 =

Men's 400 metres T52 at the XIV Paralympic Games
- Venue: London Olympic Stadium
- Dates: 3 September
- Competitors: 11 from 6 nations
- Winning time: 58.54

Medalists
1st place, gold medalist(s)		Raymond Martin	United States
2nd place, silver medalist(s)		Tomoya Ito	Japan
3rd place, bronze medalist(s)		Thomas Geierspichler	Austria

Athletics at the 2012 Summer Paralympics
Classification
T/F11–13: Blind and visually impaired
T/F20: Intellectual disability
T/F31–38: Cerebral palsy
F40: Les Autres
T/F42–46: Amputees
T/F51–58: Spinal cord disability
Men T/F51–58
Track
100 m	T51	T52	T53	T54
200 m	T52	T53
400 m	T52	T53	T54
800 m	T52	T53	T54
1500 m	T54
5000 m	T54
4×400 m relay	T53-54
Road
Marathon	T54
Field
Shot put	F52-3	F54-6
F57-8
Club throw	F31-32/51
Discus throw	F51-3	F54-6
F57-8
Javelin throw	F52-3	F54-6
F57-8
Women T/F51–58
Track
100 m	T52	T53	T54
200 m	T52	T53
400 m	T53	T54
800 m	T53	T54
1500 m	T54
5000 m	T54
Road
Marathon	T54
Field
Shot put	F54-6
F57-8
Club throw	F31-32/51
Discus throw	F51-3
F57-8
Javelin throw	F33-34/52-53	F54-6
F57-8

The Men's 400 metres T52 event at the 2012 Summer Paralympics took place at the London Olympic Stadium on 3 September.

The T52 category is for wheelchair athletes with damage to spinal cord in the higher parts of the back, substantially impaired or no trunk function, and minimal or no leg function. Pushing power comes from elbow extensions, and appears close to normal except for use of modified gloves to compensate for grip.

== Records ==
Prior to the competition, the existing World and Paralympic records were as follows:

World & Paralympic record	Tomoya Ito (JPN)	57.25	12 September 2008	Beijing, China

== Results ==
=== Round 1 ===
Competed 3 September 2012 from 10:27. Qual. rule: first 3 in each heat (Q) plus the 2 fastest other times (q) qualified.

==== Heat 1 ====
Rank	Athlete	Country	Time	Notes
1	Tomoya Ito	Japan	1:00.80	Q, SB
2	Hirokazu Ueyonabaru	Japan	1:03.64	Q, SB
3	Beat Boesch	Switzerland	1:04.83	Q
4	Josh Roberts	United States	1:04.95	q
5	Peth Rungsri	Thailand	1:06.74	q, SB
6	Leonardo De Jesus Perez Juarez	Mexico	DQ	

==== Heat 2 ====
Rank	Athlete	Country	Time	Notes
1	Raymond Martin	United States	1:00.33	Q
2	Thomas Geierspichler	Austria	1:05.72	Q
3	Paul Nitz	United States	1:11.12	Q
4	Salvador Hernandez Mondragon	Mexico	DQ	
5	Toshihiro Takada	Japan	DQ	

=== Final ===
Competed 3 September 2012 at 19:48.

Rank	Athlete	Country	Time	Notes
1st place, gold medalist(s)	Raymond Martin	United States	58.54	
2nd place, silver medalist(s)	Tomoya Ito	Japan	1:00.40	SB
3rd place, bronze medalist(s)	Thomas Geierspichler	Austria	1:04.64	SB
4	Josh Roberts	United States	1:05.76	
5	Peth Rungsri	Thailand	1:06.46	SB
6	Beat Boesch	Switzerland	1:07.72	
7	Paul Nitz	United States	1:15.15	
8	Hirokazu Ueyonabaru	Japan	DQ	

Q = qualified by place. q = qualified by time. SB = Seasonal Best. DQ = Disqualified.
