= Athletics at the 2012 Summer Paralympics – Women's 1500 metres T54 =

Women's 1500 metres T54 at the XIV Paralympic Games
- Venue: London Olympic Stadium
- Dates: 6 to 7 September
- Competitors: 12 from 7 nations
- Winning time: 3:36.42

Medalists
1st place, gold medalist(s)		Tatyana McFadden	United States
2nd place, silver medalist(s)		Edith Wolf	Switzerland
3rd place, bronze medalist(s)		Shirley Reilly	United States

Athletics at the 2012 Summer Paralympics
Classification
T/F11–13: Blind and visually impaired
T/F20: Intellectual disability
T/F31–38: Cerebral palsy
F40: Les Autres
T/F42–46: Amputees
T/F51–58: Spinal cord disability
Men T/F51–58
Track
100 m	T51	T52	T53	T54
200 m	T52	T53
400 m	T52	T53	T54
800 m	T52	T53	T54
1500 m	T54
5000 m	T54
4×400 m relay	T53-54
Road
Marathon	T54
Field
Shot put	F52-3	F54-6
F57-8
Club throw	F31-32/51
Discus throw	F51-3	F54-6
F57-8
Javelin throw	F52-3	F54-6
F57-8
Women T/F51–58
Track
100 m	T52	T53	T54
200 m	T52	T53
400 m	T53	T54
800 m	T53	T54
1500 m	T54
5000 m	T54
Road
Marathon	T54
Field
Shot put	F54-6
F57-8
Club throw	F31-32/51
Discus throw	F51-3
F57-8
Javelin throw	F33-34/52-53	F54-6
F57-8

The Women's 1500 metres T54 event at the 2012 Summer Paralympics took place at the London Olympic Stadium from 6 to 7 September. The event consisted of 2 heats and a final.

The T54 category is for wheelchair athletes with no leg function, but near full arm function and reasonable to normal trunk function. Typically this may be caused by a lower spinal cord injury or spinal cord birth defect.

== Records ==
Prior to the competition, the existing World and Paralympic records were as follows:

World record	Shelly Woods (GBR)	3:21.22	24 June 2010	Arbon, Switzerland
Paralympic record	Chantal Petitclerc (CAN)	3:26.89	24 September 2004	Athens, Greece

== Results ==
=== Round 1 ===
Competed 6 September 2012 from 12:29. Qual. rule: first 3 in each heat (Q) plus the 4 fastest other times (q) qualified.

==== Heat 1 ====
Rank	Athlete	Country	Class	Time	Notes
1	Zou Lihong	China	T54	3:31.93	Q, PB
2	Edith Wolf	Switzerland	T54	3:32.04	Q
3	Tatyana McFadden	United States	T54	3:32.14	Q
4	Diane Roy	Canada	T54	3:32.27	q
5	Jade Jones	Great Britain	T54	3:32.60	q
6	Gunilla Wallengren	Sweden	T54	3:33.53	q, SB

==== Heat 2 ====
Rank	Athlete	Country	Class	Time	Notes
1	Shelly Woods	Great Britain	T54	3:42.12	Q
2	Shirley Reilly	United States	T53	3:42.18	Q
3	Amanda McGrory	United States	T53	3:42.47	Q
4	Keira-Lyn Frie	Canada	T54	3:42.59	q
5	Christie Dawes	Australia	T54	3:43.36	SB
6	Alexandra Helbling	Switzerland	T54	3:43.59	

=== Final ===
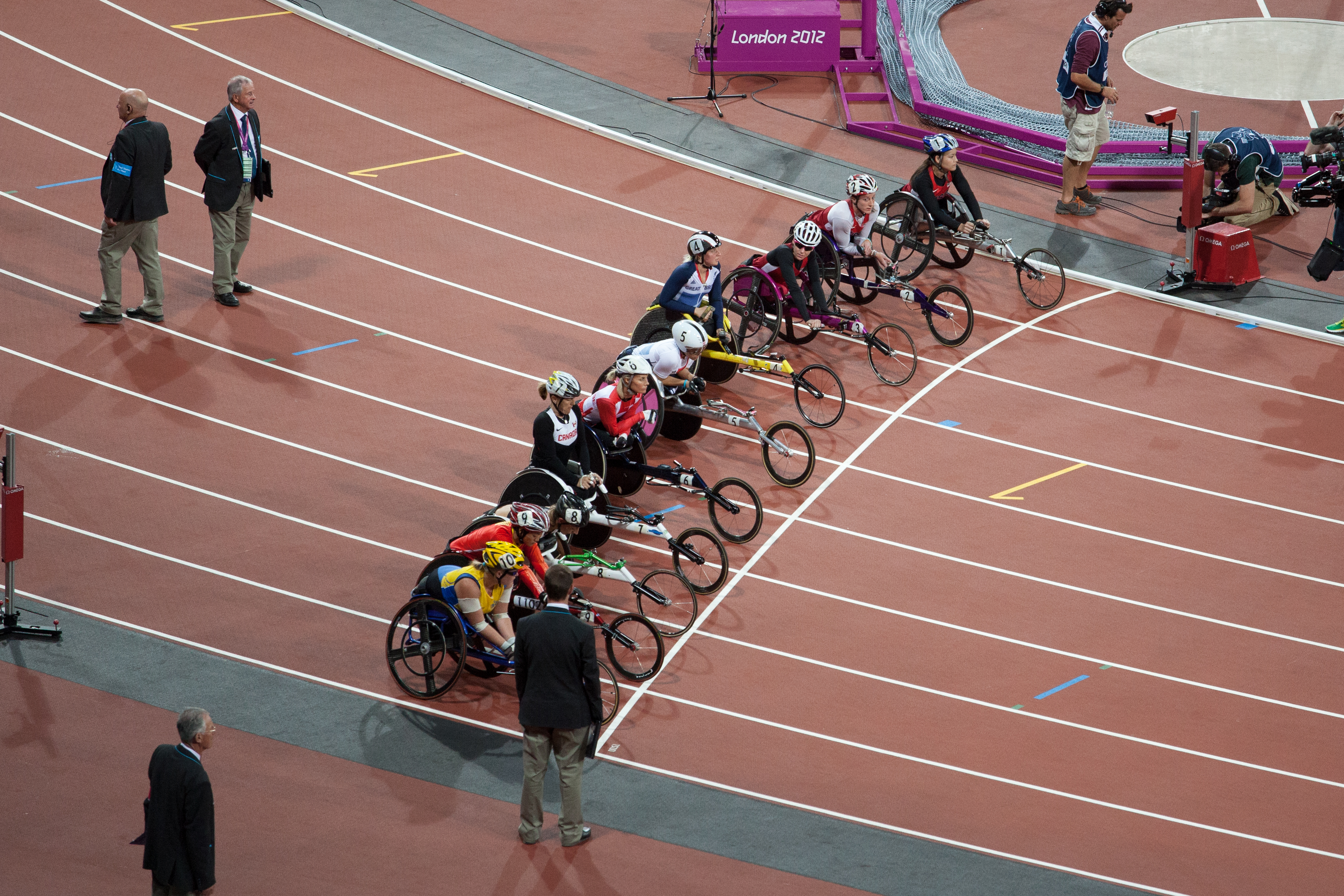
London 2012 1500m final

Competed 7 September 2012 at 21:08.

Rank	Athlete	Country	Class	Time	Notes
1st place, gold medalist(s)	Tatyana McFadden	United States	T54	3:36.42	
2nd place, silver medalist(s)	Edith Wolf	Switzerland	T54	3:36.78	
3rd place, bronze medalist(s)	Shirley Reilly	United States	T53	3:37.03	
4	Diane Roy	Canada	T54	3:37.17	
5	Zou Lihong	China	T54	3:37.91	
6	Shelly Woods	Great Britain	T54	3:37.97	
7	Amanda McGrory	United States	T53	3:38.19	
8	Keira-Lyn Frie	Canada	T54	3:38.58	
9	Gunilla Wallengren	Sweden	T54	3:39.02	
10	Jade Jones	Great Britain	T54	3:39.03	

Q = qualified by place. q = qualified by time. PB = Personal Best. SB = Seasonal Best.
