= Athletics at the 2012 Summer Paralympics – Men's 100 metres T51 =

Men's 100 metres T51 at the XIV Paralympic Games
- Venue: London Olympic Stadium
- Dates: 3 September
- Competitors: 22 from 15 nations

Medalists
1st place, gold medalist(s)		Toni Piispanen	Finland
2nd place, silver medalist(s)		Alvise De Vidi	Italy
3rd place, bronze medalist(s)		Mohamed Berrahal	Algeria

Athletics at the 2012 Summer Paralympics
Classification
T/F11–13: Blind and visually impaired
T/F20: Intellectual disability
T/F31–38: Cerebral palsy
F40: Les Autres
T/F42–46: Amputees
T/F51–58: Spinal cord disability
Men T/F51–58
Track
100 m	T51	T52	T53	T54
200 m	T52	T53
400 m	T52	T53	T54
800 m	T52	T53	T54
1500 m	T54
5000 m	T54
4×400 m relay	T53-54
Road
Marathon	T54
Field
Shot put	F52-3	F54-6
F57-8
Club throw	F31-32/51
Discus throw	F51-3	F54-6
F57-8
Javelin throw	F52-3	F54-6
F57-8
Women T/F51–58
Track
100 m	T52	T53	T54
200 m	T52	T53
400 m	T53	T54
800 m	T53	T54
1500 m	T54
5000 m	T54
Road
Marathon	T54
Field
Shot put	F54-6
F57-8
Club throw	F31-32/51
Discus throw	F51-3
F57-8
Javelin throw	F33-34/52-53	F54-6
F57-8

The Men's 100 metres T51 event at the 2012 Summer Paralympics took place at the London Olympic Stadium on 3 September.

The T51 category is for wheelchair athletes having spinal cord injuries, with mild weakness in shoulders, limited ability in straightening elbows and wrist function, and no finger, trunk or leg function.

== Records ==
Prior to the competition, the existing World and Paralympic records were as follows.

Worldrecord	Toni Piispanen (FIN)	21.11	Pratteln, Switzerland	17 May 2012
Broken records during the 2012 Summer Paralympics
Paralympic record	Toni Piispanen (FIN)	21.72	London, United Kingdom	3 September 2012

== Results ==
There were no heats for this event. The final was competed on 3 September 2012 at 19:10.

=== Final ===
Rank	Athlete	Country	Time	Notes
1st place, gold medalist(s)	Toni Piispanen	Finland	21.72	PR
2nd place, silver medalist(s)	Alvise De Vidi	Italy	22.60	
3rd place, bronze medalist(s)	Mohamed Berrahal	Algeria	22.97	RR
4	Edgar Cesareo Navarro Sanchez	Mexico	23.35	
5	Stephen Osborne	Great Britain	23.40	
6	Pieter du Preez	South Africa	24.21	
7	John McCarthy	Ireland	25.53	
8	Satoshi Inoue	Japan	26.11	
			Wind: Nil	

Q = qualified by place. q = qualified by time. WR = World Record. RR = Regional Record. PB = Personal Best. SB = Seasonal Best.
