= Athletics at the 2012 Summer Paralympics – Men's 100 metres T52 =

Men's 100 metres T52 at the XIV Paralympic Games
- Venue: London Olympic Stadium
- Dates: 2 September
- Competitors: 11 from 7 nations

Medalists
1st place, gold medalist(s)		Raymond Martin	United States
2nd place, silver medalist(s)		Salvador Hernandez; Mondragon	Mexico
3rd place, bronze medalist(s)		Paul Nitz	United States

Athletics at the 2012 Summer Paralympics
Classification
T/F11–13: Blind and visually impaired
T/F20: Intellectual disability
T/F31–38: Cerebral palsy
F40: Les Autres
T/F42–46: Amputees
T/F51–58: Spinal cord disability
Men T/F51–58
Track
100 m	T51	T52	T53	T54
200 m	T52	T53
400 m	T52	T53	T54
800 m	T52	T53	T54
1500 m	T54
5000 m	T54
4×400 m relay	T53-54
Road
Marathon	T54
Field
Shot put	F52-3	F54-6
F57-8
Club throw	F31-32/51
Discus throw	F51-3	F54-6
F57-8
Javelin throw	F52-3	F54-6
F57-8
Women T/F51–58
Track
100 m	T52	T53	T54
200 m	T52	T53
400 m	T53	T54
800 m	T53	T54
1500 m	T54
5000 m	T54
Road
Marathon	T54
Field
Shot put	F54-6
F57-8
Club throw	F31-32/51
Discus throw	F51-3
F57-8
Javelin throw	F33-34/52-53	F54-6
F57-8

The Men's 100 metres T52 event at the 2012 Summer Paralympics took place at the London Olympic Stadium on 2 September.

The T52 category is for wheelchair athletes with damage to spinal cord in the higher parts of the back, substantially impaired or no trunk function, and minimal or no leg function. Pushing power comes from elbow extensions, and appears close to normal except for use of modified gloves to compensate for grip.

== Records ==
Prior to the competition, the existing World and Paralympic records were as follows.

World record	Paul Nitz (USA)	16.73	Nottwil, Switzerland	20 May 2012
Paralympic record	Dean Bergeron (CAN)	17.47	Beijing, China	13 September 2008
Broken records during the 2012 Summer Paralympics
Paralympic record	Raymond Martin (USA)	16.79	London, United Kingdom	2 September 2012

== Results ==
=== Round 1 ===
Competed 2 September 2012 from 11:55. Qual. rule: first 3 in each heat (Q) plus the 2 fastest other times (q) qualified.

==== Heat 1 ====
Rank	Athlete	Country	Time	Notes
1	Raymond Martin	United States	16.79	Q, PR
2	Salvador Hernandez Mondragon	Mexico	17.34	Q
3	Josh Roberts	United States	18.36	Q, PB
4	Thomas Geierspichler	Austria	18.67	q
5	Sam McIntosh	Australia	18.70	SB
6	Toshihiro Takada	Japan	19.63	SB
			Wind: +1.5 m/s	

==== Heat 2 ====
Rank	Athlete	Country	Time	Notes
1	Paul Nitz	United States	17.11	Q
2	Beat Boesch	Switzerland	17.99	Q, SB
3	Peth Rungsri	Thailand	18.53	Q, PB
4	Tomoya Ito	Japan	18.65	q
5	Hirokazu Ueyonabaru	Japan	19.86	
			Wind: -0.1 m/s	

=== Final ===
Competed 2 September 2012 at 19:42.

Rank	Athlete	Country	Time	Notes
1st place, gold medalist(s)	Raymond Martin	United States	17.02	
2nd place, silver medalist(s)	Salvador Hernandez Mondragon	Mexico	17.64	
3rd place, bronze medalist(s)	Paul Nitz	United States	17.99	
4	Beat Boesch	Switzerland	18.41	
5	Tomoya Ito	Japan	18.74	
6	Josh Roberts	United States	18.86	
7	Thomas Geierspichler	Austria	19.01	
8	Peth Rungsri	Thailand	19.05	
			Wind: +0.1 m/s	

Q = qualified by place. q = qualified by time. PR = Paralympic Record. PB = Personal Best. SB = Seasonal Best.
