= Athletics at the 2012 Summer Paralympics – Men's 800 metres T54 =

Men's 800 metres T54 at the XIV Paralympic Games
- Venue: London Olympic Stadium
- Dates: 5 to 6 September
- Competitors: 23 from 15 nations
- Winning time: 1:37.63

Medalists
1st place, gold medalist(s)		David Weir	Great Britain
2nd place, silver medalist(s)		Marcel Hug	Switzerland
3rd place, bronze medalist(s)		Saichon Konjen	Thailand

Athletics at the 2012 Summer Paralympics
Classification
T/F11–13: Blind and visually impaired
T/F20: Intellectual disability
T/F31–38: Cerebral palsy
F40: Les Autres
T/F42–46: Amputees
T/F51–58: Spinal cord disability
Men T/F51–58
Track
100 m	T51	T52	T53	T54
200 m	T52	T53
400 m	T52	T53	T54
800 m	T52	T53	T54
1500 m	T54
5000 m	T54
4×400 m relay	T53-54
Road
Marathon	T54
Field
Shot put	F52-3	F54-6
F57-8
Club throw	F31-32/51
Discus throw	F51-3	F54-6
F57-8
Javelin throw	F52-3	F54-6
F57-8
Women T/F51–58
Track
100 m	T52	T53	T54
200 m	T52	T53
400 m	T53	T54
800 m	T53	T54
1500 m	T54
5000 m	T54
Road
Marathon	T54
Field
Shot put	F54-6
F57-8
Club throw	F31-32/51
Discus throw	F51-3
F57-8
Javelin throw	F33-34/52-53	F54-6
F57-8

The Men's 800 metres T54 event at the 2012 Summer Paralympics took place at the London Olympic Stadium from 5 to 6 September.

The T54 category is for wheelchair athletes with no leg function, but near full arm function and reasonable to normal trunk function. Typically this may be caused by a lower spinal cord injury or spinal cord birth defect.

== Records ==
Prior to the competition, the existing World and Paralympic records were as follows:

World record	Ernst van Dyk (RSA)	1:32.17	25 August 2001	Jona, Switzerland
Paralympic record	Choke Yasuoka (JPN)	1:32.45	25 September 2004	Athens, Greece

== Results ==
=== Round 1 ===
Competed 5 September 2012 from 10:17. Qual. rule: first 2 in each heat (Q) plus the 2 fastest other times (q) qualified.

==== Heat 1 ====
Rank	Athlete	Country	Time	Notes
1	Zhang Lixin	China	1:37.54	Q, PB
2	Julien Casoli	France	1:37.76	Q
3	Kim Gyu Dae	South Korea	1:37.90	q
4	Josh Cassidy	Canada	1:38.24	q, SB
5	Fernando Sanchez Nava	Mexico	1:38.82	
6	Masayuki Higuchi	Japan	1:38.85	
7	Jake Lappin	Australia	1:41.23	

==== Heat 2 ====
Rank	Athlete	Country	Time	Notes
1	David Weir	Great Britain	1:37.09	Q
2	Marcel Hug	Switzerland	1:38.27	Q
3	Kurt Fearnley	Australia	1:38.62	
4	Mohammad Vahdani	United Arab Emirates	1:40.38	
5	Pedro Gandarilla Fernandez	Mexico	1:40.84	
6	Nobukazu Hanaoka	Japan	1:40.94	
7	Ryan Chalmers	United States	1:45.86	
8	Demba Jarju	The Gambia	2:27.88	SB

==== Heat 3 ====
Rank	Athlete	Country	Time	Notes
1	Saichon Konjen	Thailand	1:37.96	Q
2	Jordan Bird	United States	1:38.20	Q
3	Choke Yasuoka	Japan	1:38.42	SB
4	Juan Valladares	Venezuela	1:38.83	
5	Ahmed Aouadi	Tunisia	1:38.84	
6	Alexandre Dupont	Canada	1:39.73	
7	Hong Sukman	South Korea	1:39.88	SB
8	Martin Velasco Soria	Mexico	1:43.88	

=== Final ===
Competed 6 September 2012 at 21:16.

Rank	Athlete	Country	Time	Notes
1st place, gold medalist(s)	David Weir	Great Britain	1:37.63	
2nd place, silver medalist(s)	Marcel Hug	Switzerland	1:37.84	
3rd place, bronze medalist(s)	Saichon Konjen	Thailand	1:38.51	
4	Kim Gyu Dae	South Korea	1:39.03	
5	Josh Cassidy	Canada	1:39.72	
6	Jordan Bird	United States	1:40.17	
	Julien Casoli	France	DNF	
	Zhang Lixin	China	DQ	

Q = qualified by place. q = qualified by time. PB = Personal Best. SB = Seasonal Best. DNF = Did not finish.
