= Athletics at the 2012 Summer Paralympics – Women's 400 metres T53 =

Women's 400 metres T53 at the XIV Paralympic Games
- Venue: London Olympic Stadium
- Dates: 8 September
- Competitors: 8 from 4 nations
- Winning time: 55.47

Medalists
1st place, gold medalist(s)		Zhou Hongzhuan	China
2nd place, silver medalist(s)		Angela Ballard	Australia
3rd place, bronze medalist(s)		Huang Lisha	China

Athletics at the 2012 Summer Paralympics
Classification
T/F11–13: Blind and visually impaired
T/F20: Intellectual disability
T/F31–38: Cerebral palsy
F40: Les Autres
T/F42–46: Amputees
T/F51–58: Spinal cord disability
Men T/F51–58
Track
100 m	T51	T52	T53	T54
200 m	T52	T53
400 m	T52	T53	T54
800 m	T52	T53	T54
1500 m	T54
5000 m	T54
4×400 m relay	T53-54
Road
Marathon	T54
Field
Shot put	F52-3	F54-6
F57-8
Club throw	F31-32/51
Discus throw	F51-3	F54-6
F57-8
Javelin throw	F52-3	F54-6
F57-8
Women T/F51–58
Track
100 m	T52	T53	T54
200 m	T52	T53
400 m	T53	T54
800 m	T53	T54
1500 m	T54
5000 m	T54
Road
Marathon	T54
Field
Shot put	F54-6
F57-8
Club throw	F31-32/51
Discus throw	F51-3
F57-8
Javelin throw	F33-34/52-53	F54-6
F57-8

The Women's 400 metres T53 event at the 2012 Summer Paralympics took place at the London Olympic Stadium on 8 September. The event consisted of a single race.

The T53 category is for wheelchair athletes with normal use of arms and hands, no or limited trunk function, and no leg function.

== Records ==
Prior to the competition, the existing World and Paralympic records were as follows:

World & Paralympic record	Jessica Galli (USA)	54.88	10 September 2008	Beijing, China

== Results ==
Competed 8 September 2012 at 21:42.

Rank	Athlete	Country	Time	Notes
1st place, gold medalist(s)	Zhou Hongzhuan	China	55.47	PB
2nd place, silver medalist(s)	Angela Ballard	Australia	56.06	RR
3rd place, bronze medalist(s)	Huang Lisha	China	56.87	PB
4	Shirley Reilly	United States	57.18	
5	Jessica Galli	United States	57.56	
6	Madison de Rozario	Australia	58.42	
7	Anjali Forber Pratt	United States	59.34	
8	Jessica Cooper Lewis	Bermuda	1:08.88	

Q = qualified by place. q = qualified by time. RR = Regional Record. PB = Personal Best. SB = Seasonal Best.
