= Athletics at the 2012 Summer Paralympics – Men's 400 metres T54 =

Men's 400 metres T54 at the XIV Paralympic Games
- Venue: London Olympic Stadium
- Dates: 5 to 7 September
- Competitors: 21 from 13 nations
- Winning time: 46.88

Medalists
1st place, gold medalist(s)		Zhang Lixin	China
2nd place, silver medalist(s)		Kenny van Weeghel	Netherlands
3rd place, bronze medalist(s)		Liu Chengming	China

Athletics at the 2012 Summer Paralympics
Classification
T/F11–13: Blind and visually impaired
T/F20: Intellectual disability
T/F31–38: Cerebral palsy
F40: Les Autres
T/F42–46: Amputees
T/F51–58: Spinal cord disability
Men T/F51–58
Track
100 m	T51	T52	T53	T54
200 m	T52	T53
400 m	T52	T53	T54
800 m	T52	T53	T54
1500 m	T54
5000 m	T54
4×400 m relay	T53-54
Road
Marathon	T54
Field
Shot put	F52-3	F54-6
F57-8
Club throw	F31-32/51
Discus throw	F51-3	F54-6
F57-8
Javelin throw	F52-3	F54-6
F57-8
Women T/F51–58
Track
100 m	T52	T53	T54
200 m	T52	T53
400 m	T53	T54
800 m	T53	T54
1500 m	T54
5000 m	T54
Road
Marathon	T54
Field
Shot put	F54-6
F57-8
Club throw	F31-32/51
Discus throw	F51-3
F57-8
Javelin throw	F33-34/52-53	F54-6
F57-8

The men's 400 metres T54 event at the 2012 Summer Paralympics took place at the London Olympic Stadium from 5 to 7 September.

The T54 category is for wheelchair athletes with no leg function, but near full arm function and reasonable to normal trunk function. Typically this may be caused by a lower spinal cord injury or spinal cord birth defect.

== Records ==
Prior to the competition, the existing World and Paralympic records were as follows:

World & Paralympic record	Zhang Lixin (CHN)	45.07	10 September 2008	Beijing, China

== Results ==
=== Round 1 ===
Competed 5 September 2012 from 19:51. Qual. rule: first 2 in each heat (Q) plus the 2 fastest other times (q) qualified.

==== Heat 1 ====
Rank	Athlete	Country	Time	Notes
1	Liu Chengming	China	48.01	Q, =SB
2	Marc Schuh	Germany	48.87	Q
3	Supachai Koysub	Thailand	50.66	SB
4	Alexandre Dupont	Canada	51.17	
5	Ryan Chalmers	United States	53.63	
6	Ahmed Aouadi	Tunisia	DQ	
7	Jake Lappin	Australia	DQ	

==== Heat 2 ====
Rank	Athlete	Country	Time	Notes
1	Saichon Konjen	Thailand	47.87	Q, SB
2	Kenny van Weeghel	Netherlands	48.06	Q
3	Cui Yanfeng	China	48.28	q, PB
4	Leo Pekka Tahti	Finland	48.30	q
5	Curtis Thom	Canada	48.57	
6	Jordan Bird	United States	49.53	
7	Fernando Sanchez Nava	Mexico	DQ	

==== Heat 3 ====
Rank	Athlete	Country	Time	Notes
1	Zhang Lixin	China	48.72	Q, SB
2	Marcel Hug	Switzerland	48.87	Q
3	Mohammad Vahdani	United Arab Emirates	50.00	
4	Juan Valladares	Venezuela	50.41	
5	Richard Nicholson	Australia	50.49	
6	Colin Mathieson	Canada	51.95	
7	Juan Pablo Cervantes Garcia	Mexico	52.83	

=== Final ===
Competed 7 September 2012 at 20:47.

Rank	Athlete	Country	Time	Notes
1st place, gold medalist(s)	Zhang Lixin	China	46.88	PB
2nd place, silver medalist(s)	Kenny van Weeghel	Netherlands	47.12	PB
3rd place, bronze medalist(s)	Liu Chengming	China	47.36	PB
4	Leo Pekka Tahti	Finland	47.68	PB
5	Marcel Hug	Switzerland	47.80	
6	Marc Schuh	Germany	48.42	
7	Cui Yanfeng	China	51.20	
	Saichon Konjen	Thailand	DQ	

Q = qualified by place. q = qualified by time. PB = Personal Best. SB = Seasonal Best. DQ = Disqualified.
