= Athletics at the 2012 Summer Paralympics – Men's 200 metres T53 =

Men's 200 metres T53 at the XIV Paralympic Games
- Venue: London Olympic Stadium
- Dates: 7 September
- Competitors: 22 from 14 nations
- Winning time: 25.61

Medalists
1st place, gold medalist(s)		Li Huzhao	China
2nd place, silver medalist(s)		Brent Lakatos	Canada
3rd place, bronze medalist(s)		Zhao Yufei	China

Athletics at the 2012 Summer Paralympics
Classification
T/F11–13: Blind and visually impaired
T/F20: Intellectual disability
T/F31–38: Cerebral palsy
F40: Les Autres
T/F42–46: Amputees
T/F51–58: Spinal cord disability
Men T/F51–58
Track
100 m	T51	T52	T53	T54
200 m	T52	T53
400 m	T52	T53	T54
800 m	T52	T53	T54
1500 m	T54
5000 m	T54
4×400 m relay	T53-54
Road
Marathon	T54
Field
Shot put	F52-3	F54-6
F57-8
Club throw	F31-32/51
Discus throw	F51-3	F54-6
F57-8
Javelin throw	F52-3	F54-6
F57-8
Women T/F51–58
Track
100 m	T52	T53	T54
200 m	T52	T53
400 m	T53	T54
800 m	T53	T54
1500 m	T54
5000 m	T54
Road
Marathon	T54
Field
Shot put	F54-6
F57-8
Club throw	F31-32/51
Discus throw	F51-3
F57-8
Javelin throw	F33-34/52-53	F54-6
F57-8

The Men's 200 metres T53 event at the 2012 Summer Paralympics took place at the London Olympic Stadium on 7 September.

The T53 category is for wheelchair athletes with normal use of arms and hands, no or limited trunk function, and no leg function.

== Records ==
Prior to the competition, the existing World and Paralympic records were as follows:

World record	Christopher Waddell (USA)	25.24	2 July 2004	Atlanta, United States
Paralympic record	Hong Suk-man (KOR)	26.31	27 September 2004	Athens, Greece
Broken records during the 2012 Summer Paralympics
Paralympic record	Li Huzhao (CHN)	26.08	7 September 2012	
Paralympic record	Li Huzhao (CHN)	25.61	7 September 2012	

== Results ==
=== Round 1 ===
Competed 7 September 2012 from 11:51. Qual. rule: first 2 in each heat (Q) plus the 2 fastest other times (q) qualified.

==== Heat 1 ====
Rank	Athlete	Country	Time	Notes
1	Li Huzhao	China	26.08	Q, PR
2	Brent Lakatos	Canada	26.20	Q, PB
3	Richard Colman	Australia	26.75	q, RR
4	Jung Dong Ho	South Korea	26.94	PB
5	Jesus Aguilar	Venezuela	27.69	
6	Zach Abbott	United States	27.71	
7	Hitoshi Matsunaga	Japan	28.32	
			Wind: -0.1 m/s	

==== Heat 2 ====
Rank	Athlete	Country	Time	Notes
1	Yu Shiran	China	26.17	Q, PB
2	Ariosvaldo Fernandes Silva	Brazil	26.61	Q, PB
3	Joshua George	United States	26.76	
4	Brian Siemann	United States	26.78	
5	Yoo Byunghoon	South Korea	27.32	SB
6	Pierre Fairbank	France	27.52	PB
7	Sopa Intasen	Thailand	27.97	SB
8	Jaime Ramirez Valencia	Mexico	28.78	SB
			Wind: -0.1 m/s	

==== Heat 3 ====
Rank	Athlete	Country	Time	Notes
1	Zhao Yufei	China	26.46	Q, PB
2	Hamad N M E Aladwani	Kuwait	26.67	Q, PB
3	Mickey Bushell	Great Britain	26.73	q, RR
4	Jun Hiromichi	Japan	27.84	
5	Eric Gauthier	Canada	28.26	
6	Mohamed Bani Hashem	United Arab Emirates	28.39	SB
7	Pichet Krungget	Thailand	29.11	SB
			Wind: -0.1 m/s	

=== Final ===
Competed 7 September 2012 at 20:31.

Rank	Athlete	Country	Time	Notes
1st place, gold medalist(s)	Li Huzhao	China	25.61	PR
2nd place, silver medalist(s)	Brent Lakatos	Canada	25.85	PB
3rd place, bronze medalist(s)	Zhao Yufei	China	26.00	PB
4	Mickey Bushell	Great Britain	26.32	RR
5	Yu Shiran	China	26.46	
6	Hamad N M E Aladwani	Kuwait	26.50	PB
7	Richard Colman	Australia	26.67	RR
8	Ariosvaldo Fernandes Silva	Brazil	26.83	
			Wind: +0.2 m/s	

Q = qualified by place. q = qualified by time. PR = Paralympic Record. RR = Regional Record. PB = Personal Best. SB = Seasonal Best.
