= Athletics at the 2012 Summer Paralympics – Women's 800 metres T53 =

Women's 800 metres T53 at the XIV Paralympic Games
- Venue: London Olympic Stadium
- Dates: 5 September
- Competitors: 7 from 3 nations
- Winning time: 1:52.85

Medalists
1st place, gold medalist(s)		Zhou Hongzhuan	China
2nd place, silver medalist(s)		Huang Lisha	China
3rd place, bronze medalist(s)		Jessica Galli	United States

Athletics at the 2012 Summer Paralympics
Classification
T/F11–13: Blind and visually impaired
T/F20: Intellectual disability
T/F31–38: Cerebral palsy
F40: Les Autres
T/F42–46: Amputees
T/F51–58: Spinal cord disability
Men T/F51–58
Track
100 m	T51	T52	T53	T54
200 m	T52	T53
400 m	T52	T53	T54
800 m	T52	T53	T54
1500 m	T54
5000 m	T54
4×400 m relay	T53-54
Road
Marathon	T54
Field
Shot put	F52-3	F54-6
F57-8
Club throw	F31-32/51
Discus throw	F51-3	F54-6
F57-8
Javelin throw	F52-3	F54-6
F57-8
Women T/F51–58
Track
100 m	T52	T53	T54
200 m	T52	T53
400 m	T53	T54
800 m	T53	T54
1500 m	T54
5000 m	T54
Road
Marathon	T54
Field
Shot put	F54-6
F57-8
Club throw	F31-32/51
Discus throw	F51-3
F57-8
Javelin throw	F33-34/52-53	F54-6
F57-8

The Women's 800 metres T53 event at the 2012 Summer Paralympics took place at the London Olympic Stadium on 5 September. The event consisted of a single race.

The T53 category is for wheelchair athletes with normal use of arms and hands, no or limited trunk function, and no leg function.

== Records ==
Prior to the competition, the existing World and Paralympic records were as follows:

World record	Jessica Galli (USA)	1:49.82	29 June 2007	Atlanta, United States
Paralympic record	Tanni Grey-Thompson (GBR)	1:55.12	19 August 1996	Atlanta, United States
Broken records during the 2012 Summer Paralympics
Paralympic record	Zhou Hongzhuan (CHN)	1:52.85	5 September 2012	

== Results ==
Competed 5 September 2012 at 20:12.

Rank	Athlete	Country	Time	Notes
1st place, gold medalist(s)	Zhou Hongzhuan	China	1:52.85	PR
2nd place, silver medalist(s)	Huang Lisha	China	1:53.10	PB
3rd place, bronze medalist(s)	Jessica Galli	United States	1:53.12	
4	Madison de Rozario	Australia	1:53.65	
5	Angela Ballard	Australia	1:53.80	
6	Shirley Reilly	United States	1:54.18	
7	Amanda McGrory	United States	1:54.48	

Q = qualified by place. q = qualified by time. PR = Paralympic Record. PB = Personal Best. SB = Seasonal Best.
