= Athletics at the 2012 Summer Paralympics – Men's 400 metres T53 =

Men's 400 metres T53 at the XIV Paralympic Games
- Venue: London Olympic Stadium
- Dates: 2 September
- Competitors: 19 from 13 nations
- Winning time: 49.70

Medalists
1st place, gold medalist(s)		Li Huzhao	China
2nd place, silver medalist(s)		Brent Lakatos	Canada
3rd place, bronze medalist(s)		Richard Colman	Australia

Athletics at the 2012 Summer Paralympics
Classification
T/F11–13: Blind and visually impaired
T/F20: Intellectual disability
T/F31–38: Cerebral palsy
F40: Les Autres
T/F42–46: Amputees
T/F51–58: Spinal cord disability
Men T/F51–58
Track
100 m	T51	T52	T53	T54
200 m	T52	T53
400 m	T52	T53	T54
800 m	T52	T53	T54
1500 m	T54
5000 m	T54
4×400 m relay	T53-54
Road
Marathon	T54
Field
Shot put	F52-3	F54-6
F57-8
Club throw	F31-32/51
Discus throw	F51-3	F54-6
F57-8
Javelin throw	F52-3	F54-6
F57-8
Women T/F51–58
Track
100 m	T52	T53	T54
200 m	T52	T53
400 m	T53	T54
800 m	T53	T54
1500 m	T54
5000 m	T54
Road
Marathon	T54
Field
Shot put	F54-6
F57-8
Club throw	F31-32/51
Discus throw	F51-3
F57-8
Javelin throw	F33-34/52-53	F54-6
F57-8

The Men's 400 metres T53 event at the 2012 Summer Paralympics took place at the London Olympic Stadium on 2 September.

The T53 category is for wheelchair athletes with normal use of arms and hands, no or limited trunk function, and no leg function.

== Records ==
Prior to the competition, the existing World and Paralympic records were as follows:

World & Paralympic record	Hong Suk-Man (KOR)	47.67	11 September 2008	Beijing, China

== Results ==
=== Round 1 ===
Competed 2 September 2012 from 11:24. Qual. rule: first 2 in each heat (Q) plus the 2 fastest other times (q) qualified.

==== Heat 1 ====
Rank	Athlete	Country	Time	Notes
1	Li Huzhao	China	51.19	Q, SB
2	Hamad N M E Aladwani	Kuwait	51.35	Q, PB
3	Yoo Byunghoon	South Korea	52.06	q
4	Eric Gauthier	Canada	53.56	
5	Jaime Ramirez Valencia	Mexico	DQ	
6	Brian Siemann	United States	DQ	

==== Heat 2 ====
Rank	Athlete	Country	Time	Notes
1	Joshua George	United States	51.44	Q
2	Yu Shiran	China	51.74	Q, PB
3	Pierre Fairbank	France	52.23	
4	Ariosvaldo Fernandes Silva	Brazil	52.44	SB
5	Jun Hiromichi	Japan	52.74	
6	Jesus Aguilar	Venezuela	52.80	
7	Sopa Intasen	Thailand	DQ	

==== Heat 3 ====
Rank	Athlete	Country	Time	Notes
1	Brent Lakatos	Canada	49.46	Q, PB
2	Richard Colman	Australia	49.79	Q, SB
3	Jung Dong Ho	South Korea	50.02	q, PB
4	Zach Abbott	United States	52.58	PB
5	Roger Puigbo Verdaguer	Spain	53.29	
6	Pichet Krungget	Thailand	53.63	SB

=== Final ===
Competed 2 September 2012 at 20:11.

Rank	Athlete	Country	Time	Notes
1st place, gold medalist(s)	Li Huzhao	China	49.70	SB
2nd place, silver medalist(s)	Brent Lakatos	Canada	50.17	
3rd place, bronze medalist(s)	Richard Colman	Australia	50.24	
4	Yu Shiran	China	50.92	PB
5	Joshua George	United States	51.14	
6	Yoo Byunghoon	South Korea	51.30	
7	Jung Dong Ho	South Korea	51.45	
8	Hamad N M E Aladwani	Kuwait	52.04	

Q = qualified by place. q = qualified by time. PB = Personal Best. SB = Seasonal Best. DQ = Disqualified.
