= Athletics at the 2012 Summer Paralympics – Men's 100 metres T54 =

Men's 100 metres T54 at the XIV Paralympic Games
- Venue: London Olympic Stadium
- Dates: 1 and 2 September
- Competitors: 22 from 15 nations

Medalists
1st place, gold medalist(s)		Leo Pekka Tahti	Finland
2nd place, silver medalist(s)		Liu Yang	China
3rd place, bronze medalist(s)		Saichon Konjen	Thailand

Athletics at the 2012 Summer Paralympics
Classification
T/F11–13: Blind and visually impaired
T/F20: Intellectual disability
T/F31–38: Cerebral palsy
F40: Les Autres
T/F42–46: Amputees
T/F51–58: Spinal cord disability
Men T/F51–58
Track
100 m	T51	T52	T53	T54
200 m	T52	T53
400 m	T52	T53	T54
800 m	T52	T53	T54
1500 m	T54
5000 m	T54
4×400 m relay	T53-54
Road
Marathon	T54
Field
Shot put	F52-3	F54-6
F57-8
Club throw	F31-32/51
Discus throw	F51-3	F54-6
F57-8
Javelin throw	F52-3	F54-6
F57-8
Women T/F51–58
Track
100 m	T52	T53	T54
200 m	T52	T53
400 m	T53	T54
800 m	T53	T54
1500 m	T54
5000 m	T54
Road
Marathon	T54
Field
Shot put	F54-6
F57-8
Club throw	F31-32/51
Discus throw	F51-3
F57-8
Javelin throw	F33-34/52-53	F54-6
F57-8

The Men's 100 metres T54 event at the 2012 Summer Paralympics took place at the London Olympic Stadium on 1 and 2 September.

The T54 category is for wheelchair athletes with no leg function, but near full arm function and reasonable to normal trunk function. Typically this may be caused by a lower spinal cord injury or spinal cord birth defect.

== Records ==
Prior to the competition, the existing World and Paralympic records were as follows.

World & Paralympic record	Leo-Pekka Tahti (FIN)	13.76	Beijing, China	15 September 2008
Broken records during the 2012 Summer Paralympics
World record	Leo Pekka Tahti (FIN)	13.63	London, United Kingdom	1 September 2012

== Results ==
=== Round 1 ===
Competed 1 September 2012 from 12:25. Qual. rule: first 2 in each heat (Q) plus the 2 fastest other times (q) qualified.

==== Heat 1 ====
Rank	Athlete	Country	Time	Notes
1	Liu Yang	China	13.91	Q, RR
2	Saichon Konjen	Thailand	14.16	Q, SB
3	Kenny van Weeghel	Netherlands	14.21	q, SB
4	Niklas Almers	Sweden	14.89	
5	Pedro Gandarilla Fernandez	Mexico	14.93	
6	Esa-Pekka Mattila	Finland	14.99	SB
7	Nkegbe Botsyo	Ghana	15.52	
			Wind: +0.7 m/s	

==== Heat 2 ====
Rank	Athlete	Country	Time	Notes
1	Leo Pekka Tahti	Finland	13.63	Q, WR
2	Supachai Koysub	Thailand	14.43	Q, SB
3	Curtis Thom	Canada	14.47	q, RR
4	Ahmed Aouadi	Tunisia	14.51	SB
5	Mohammad Vahdani	United Arab Emirates	14.52	
6	Richard Nicholson	Australia	15.23	
7	Luis Hector Morales Garcia	El Salvador	17.62	SB
			Wind: +1.0 m/s	

==== Heat 3 ====
Rank	Athlete	Country	Time	Notes
1	Cui Yanfeng	China	14.00	Q, PB
2	Marc Schuh	Germany	14.18	Q, SB
3	Sukhum Namlun	Thailand	14.49	PB
4	Matthew Cameron	Australia	14.51	
5	Juan Pablo Cervantes Garcia	Mexico	15.10	
6	Colin Mathieson	Canada	15.25	
7	Demba Jarju	The Gambia	18.84	SB
8	Thierry Mabicka	Gabon	21.42	SB
			Wind: +1.3 m/s	

=== Final ===
Competed 2 September 2012 at 20:35.

Rank	Athlete	Country	Time	Notes
1st place, gold medalist(s)	Leo Pekka Tahti	Finland	13.79	
2nd place, silver medalist(s)	Liu Yang	China	13.92	
3rd place, bronze medalist(s)	Saichon Konjen	Thailand	14.10	=PB
4	Cui Yanfeng	China	14.11	
5	Marc Schuh	Germany	14.61	
6	Curtis Thom	Canada	14.74	
7	Supachai Koysub	Thailand	14.74	
8	Kenny van Weeghel	Netherlands	14.87	
			Wind: -0.1 m/s	

Q = qualified by place. q = qualified by time. WR = World Record. RR = Regional Record. PB = Personal Best. SB = Seasonal Best.
