= Athletics at the 2012 Summer Paralympics – Women's 200 metres T52 =

Women's 200 metres T52 at the XIV Paralympic Games
- Venue: London Olympic Stadium
- Dates: 1 September
- Competitors: 7 from 4 nations
- Winning time: 33.80

Medalists
1st place, gold medalist(s)		Michelle Stilwell	Canada
2nd place, silver medalist(s)		Marieke Vervoort	Belgium
3rd place, bronze medalist(s)		Kerry Morgan	United States

Athletics at the 2012 Summer Paralympics
Classification
T/F11–13: Blind and visually impaired
T/F20: Intellectual disability
T/F31–38: Cerebral palsy
F40: Les Autres
T/F42–46: Amputees
T/F51–58: Spinal cord disability
Men T/F51–58
Track
100 m	T51	T52	T53	T54
200 m	T52	T53
400 m	T52	T53	T54
800 m	T52	T53	T54
1500 m	T54
5000 m	T54
4×400 m relay	T53-54
Road
Marathon	T54
Field
Shot put	F52-3	F54-6
F57-8
Club throw	F31-32/51
Discus throw	F51-3	F54-6
F57-8
Javelin throw	F52-3	F54-6
F57-8
Women T/F51–58
Track
100 m	T52	T53	T54
200 m	T52	T53
400 m	T53	T54
800 m	T53	T54
1500 m	T54
5000 m	T54
Road
Marathon	T54
Field
Shot put	F54-6
F57-8
Club throw	F31-32/51
Discus throw	F51-3
F57-8
Javelin throw	F33-34/52-53	F54-6
F57-8

The Women's 200 metres T52 event at the 2012 Summer Paralympics took place at the London Olympic Stadium on 1 September. The event consisted of a single race.

The T52 category is for wheelchair athletes with damage to spinal cord in the higher parts of the back, substantially impaired or no trunk function, and minimal or no leg function. Pushing power comes from elbow extensions, and appears close to normal except for use of modified gloves to compensate for grip.

== Records ==
Prior to the competition, the existing World and Paralympic records were as follows:

World record	Michelle Stilwell (CAN)	35.92	12 July 2008	Windsor, Canada
Paralympic record	Michelle Stilwell (CAN)	36.18	11 September 2008	Beijing, China
Broken records during the 2012 Summer Paralympics
Paralympic record	Michelle Stilwell (CAN)	33.80	1 September 2012	

== Results ==
Competed 1 September 2012 at 20:15.

Rank	Athlete	Country	Time	Notes
1st place, gold medalist(s)	Michelle Stilwell	Canada	33.80	PR
2nd place, silver medalist(s)	Marieke Vervoort	Belgium	34.83	RR
3rd place, bronze medalist(s)	Kerry Morgan	United States	36.49	
4	Cassie Mitchell	United States	37.75	PB
5	Teruyo Tanaka	Japan	39.04	SB
6	Yuka Kiyama	Japan	41.56	SB
7	Cheryl Leitner	United States	42.62	
			Wind: -0.3 m/s	

Q = qualified by place. q = qualified by time. PR = Paralympic Record. RR = Regional Record. PB = Personal Best. SB = Seasonal Best.
