= Athletics at the 2012 Summer Paralympics – Men's 100 metres T53 =

Men's 100 metres T53 at the XIV Paralympic Games
- Venue: London Olympic Stadium
- Dates: 3 September
- Competitors: 13 from 10 nations

Medalists
1st place, gold medalist(s)		Mickey Bushell	Great Britain
2nd place, silver medalist(s)		Zhao Yufei	China
3rd place, bronze medalist(s)		Yu Shiran	China

Athletics at the 2012 Summer Paralympics
Classification
T/F11–13: Blind and visually impaired
T/F20: Intellectual disability
T/F31–38: Cerebral palsy
F40: Les Autres
T/F42–46: Amputees
T/F51–58: Spinal cord disability
Men T/F51–58
Track
100 m	T51	T52	T53	T54
200 m	T52	T53
400 m	T52	T53	T54
800 m	T52	T53	T54
1500 m	T54
5000 m	T54
4×400 m relay	T53-54
Road
Marathon	T54
Field
Shot put	F52-3	F54-6
F57-8
Club throw	F31-32/51
Discus throw	F51-3	F54-6
F57-8
Javelin throw	F52-3	F54-6
F57-8
Women T/F51–58
Track
100 m	T52	T53	T54
200 m	T52	T53
400 m	T53	T54
800 m	T53	T54
1500 m	T54
5000 m	T54
Road
Marathon	T54
Field
Shot put	F54-6
F57-8
Club throw	F31-32/51
Discus throw	F51-3
F57-8
Javelin throw	F33-34/52-53	F54-6
F57-8

The Men's 100 metres T53 event at the 2012 Summer Paralympics took place at the London Olympic Stadium on 3 September.

The T53 category is for wheelchair athletes with normal use of arms and hands, no or limited trunk function, and no leg function.

== Records ==
Prior to the competition, the existing World and Paralympic records were as follows.

World record	Mickey Bushell (GBR)	14.47	Arbon, Switzerland	24 June 2010
Paralympic record	Yu Shiran (CHN)	14.81	Beijing, China	16 September 2008
Broken records during the 2012 Summer Paralympics
Paralympic record	Mickey Bushell (GBR)	14.75	London, United Kingdom	3 September 2012

== Results ==
=== Round 1 ===
Competed 3 September 2012 from 10:15. Qual. rule: first 3 in each heat (Q) plus the 2 fastest other times (q) qualified.

==== Heat 1 ====
Rank	Athlete	Country	Time	Notes
1	Mickey Bushell	Great Britain	14.86	Q
2	Yu Shiran	China	15.06	Q, PB
3	Brian Siemann	United States	15.32	Q
4	Mohamed Bani Hashem	United Arab Emirates	16.01	
5	Sopa Intasen	Thailand	16.23	SB
6	Jung Dong Ho	South Korea	16.24	
7	Hitoshi Matsunaga	Japan	16.79	
			Wind: +0.3 m/s	

==== Heat 2 ====
Rank	Athlete	Country	Time	Notes
1	Brent Lakatos	Canada	15.00	Q
2	Zhao Yufei	China	15.15	Q, PB
3	Ariosvaldo Fernandes Silva	Brazil	15.22	Q
4	Hamad N M E Aladwani	Kuwait	15.62	q
5	Zach Abbott	United States	15.82	q
6	Pichet Krungget	Thailand	16.49	SB
			Wind: -0.1 m/s	

=== Final ===
Competed 3 September 2012 at 19:20.

Rank	Athlete	Country	Time	Notes
1st place, gold medalist(s)	Mickey Bushell	Great Britain	14.75	PR
2nd place, silver medalist(s)	Zhao Yufei	China	15.09	PB
3rd place, bronze medalist(s)	Yu Shiran	China	15.20	
4	Ariosvaldo Fernandes Silva	Brazil	15.31	
5	Brent Lakatos	Canada	15.31	
6	Brian Siemann	United States	15.39	
7	Hamad N M E Aladwani	Kuwait	15.47	PB
8	Zach Abbott	United States	15.51	
			Wind: +0.2 m/s	

Q = qualified by place. q = qualified by time. PR = Paralympic Record. PB = Personal Best. SB = Seasonal Best.
