= Isatou Nyang =

Gambian paralympic athlete

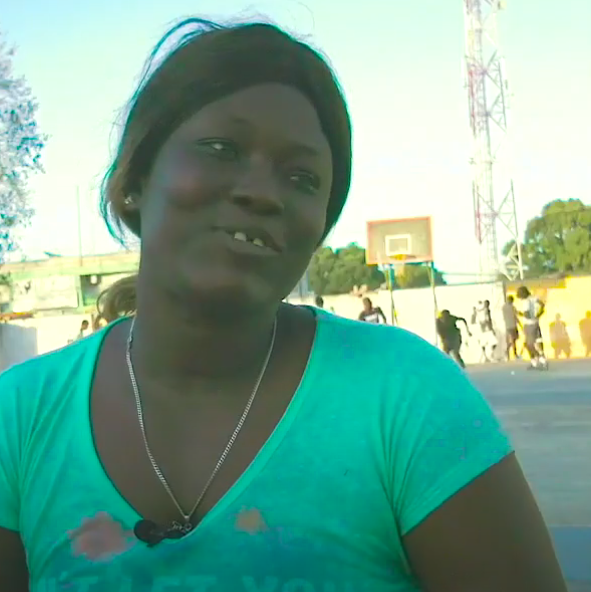
- Nyang in 2019

Personal information
- Born: 3 July 1984 (age 42) Serekunda, The Gambia
- Children: 3

Sport
- Country: Gambia
- Sport: Para-athletics
- Disability: unequal leg length
- Disability class: T54
- Events: 100 metres, 800 metres, 10,000 metres

Achievements and titles
- Paralympic finals: 2012

Isatou Nyang (born 3 July 1984) is a Gambian Paralympic athlete. She was the first female Paralympic athlete from Gambia when she raced in the 2012 Summer Paralympics, where she was the Gambian flag bearer in the opening ceremony.

== Life ==
Nyang was born in 1984 in Serekunda with legs of unequal length. Her shorter leg has a "bad foot" and her longer leg has no foot at all. Because of that, she uses a wheelchair.

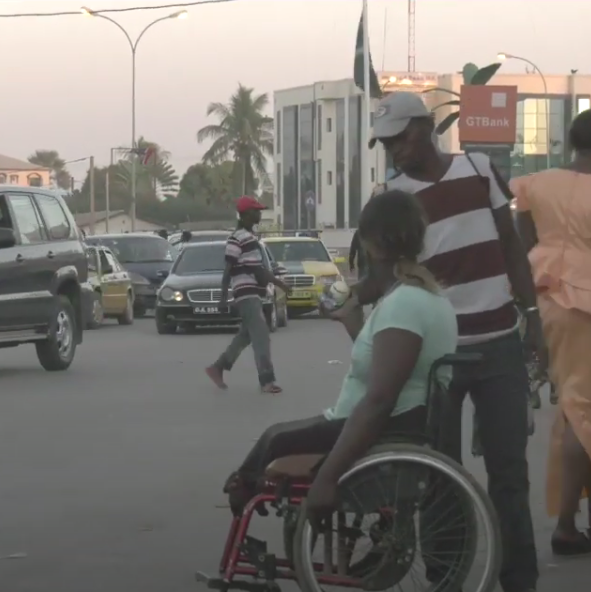
Begging in 2019

In 2002 she started training with male athletes at night playing basketball and racing. In 2004 she won a 10 km wheelchair race. She has children and despite becoming one of the best wheelchair athletes in Gambia she has no means of support. She would train four times a week and in 2011 she was recognised as the "Gambia Paralympics Player of 2010" by the Sports Journalists Association of Gambia.

In 2012 she was the flag bearer for the Gambia when she competed at the 2012 Summer Paralympics in London. Her lack of leg function placed her in the T54 category and she raced in the heats of the Women's T54 100 metres and the Women's 800 metres T54. Her 100m time of 20.32 was a seasonal best. She and Damba Jarju were the Gambia's first Paralympians and in 2015 Sulayman Colley, who was the President of the Gambia National Paralympic Committee was hoping to send six athletes to the 2016 Summer Paralympics, but this did not happen. Damba Jarju was sent again as the only representative of the Gambia in Rio.

In 2019 Nyang was begging in Gambia because she needed the money to feed her family. The success of competing at the 2012 Paralympics did not bring her financial security. In fact she made just £200 from the Paralympics. Many disabled people in the Gambia have to beg each day and travel is difficult as taxi and auto rickshaw drivers consider a wheelchair to be too much trouble. The position for people with disabilities was especially difficult during the COVID-19 pandemic restrictions, since they could not beg while staying at home.

Nyang planned to compete again in 2020, but only two athletes were sent to represent the Gambia at the Paralympics. However Nyang's result in the 100m was still cited in 2021 as her country's best result at the Paralympics.

== Private life ==
Nyang divorced her husband in 2011 and in 2019 she was supporting herself, her mother, and three children.
