= Raymond Martin (wheelchair athlete) =

American Paralympic racer (born 1994)

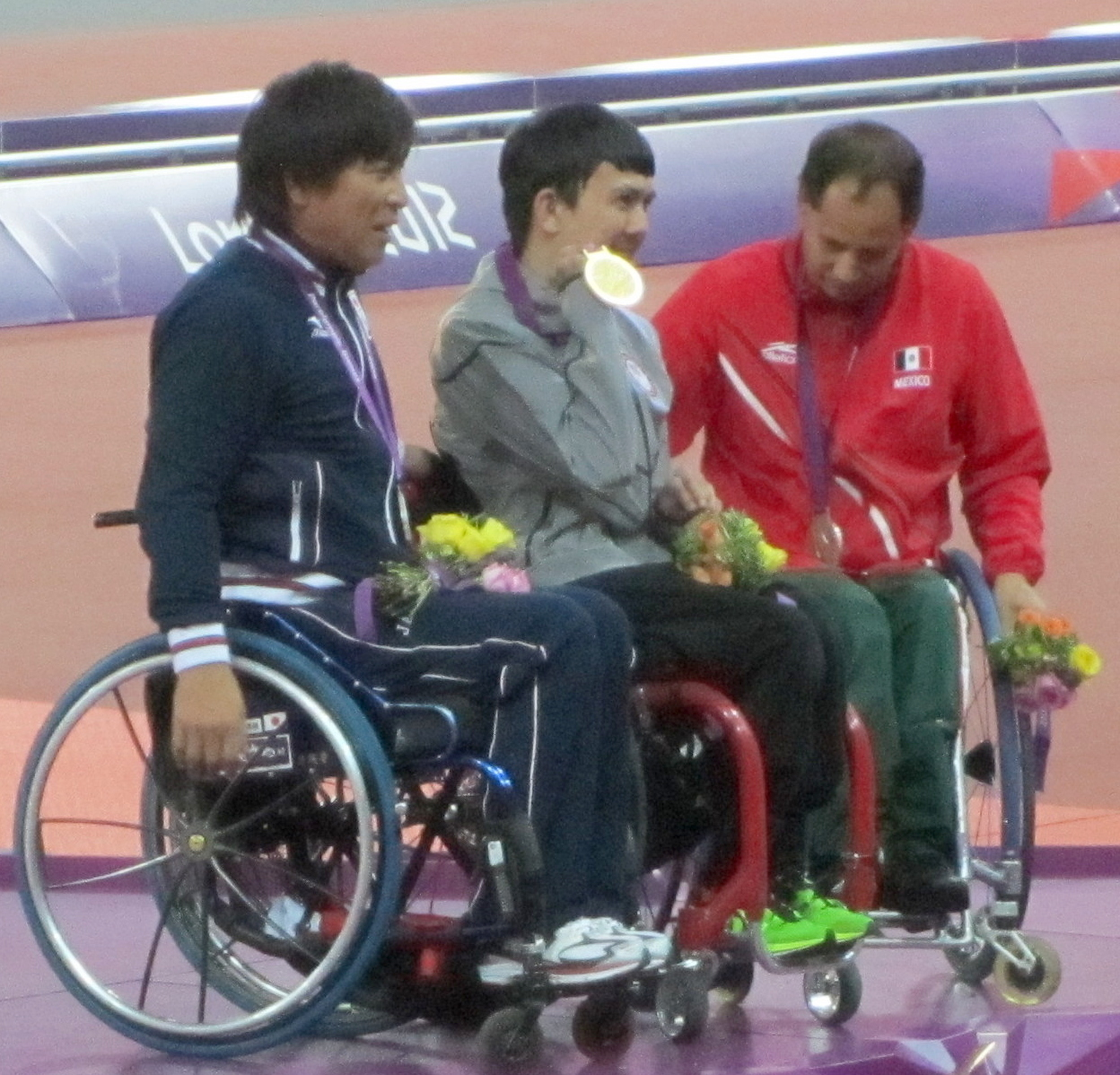
- Martin (center) at the 2012 Paralympics Men's 200m T52 victory ceremony

Personal information
- Born: January 2, 1994 (age 32) Jersey City, New Jersey, U.S.
Medal record
Men's para-athletics
Representing United States
Paralympic Games
Gold medal – first place	2012 London	100m T52
Gold medal – first place	2012 London	200m T52
Gold medal – first place	2012 London	400m T52
Gold medal – first place	2012 London	800m T52
Gold medal – first place	2016 Rio de Janeiro	400m T52
Gold medal – first place	2016 Rio de Janeiro	1500m T52
Gold medal – first place	2020 Tokyo	100m T52
Silver medal – second place	2016 Rio de Janeiro	100m T52
Silver medal – second place	2020 Tokyo	400m T52
Silver medal – second place	2020 Tokyo	1500m T52
World Championships
Gold medal – first place	2013 Lyon	100m T52
Gold medal – first place	2013 Lyon	200m T52
Gold medal – first place	2013 Lyon	400m T52
Gold medal – first place	2013 Lyon	800m T52
Gold medal – first place	2013 Lyon	1500m T52
Gold medal – first place	2015 Doha	100m T52
Gold medal – first place	2015 Doha	1500m T52
Gold medal – first place	2017 London	100m T52
Gold medal – first place	2019 Dubai	100m T52
Silver medal – second place	2017 London	400m T52
Silver medal – second place	2017 London	1500m T52
Bronze medal – third place	2019 Dubai	400m T52
Parapan American Games
Gold medal – first place	2011 Guadalajara	200m T52
Gold medal – first place	2011 Guadalajara	800m T52
Gold medal – first place	2015 Toronto	100m T52
Gold medal – first place	2015 Toronto	400m T52
Gold medal – first place	2015 Toronto	1500m T52
Silver medal – second place	2011 Guadalajara	100m T52
Silver medal – second place	2011 Guadalajara	400m T52

Raymond Martin (born January 2, 1994, in Jersey City, New Jersey) is an American Paralympic athlete of Filipino descent. He won seven Paralympic gold medals and nine World gold medals in the T52 wheelchair racing category.
