= Zhao Yufei =

Chinese Paralympic athlete

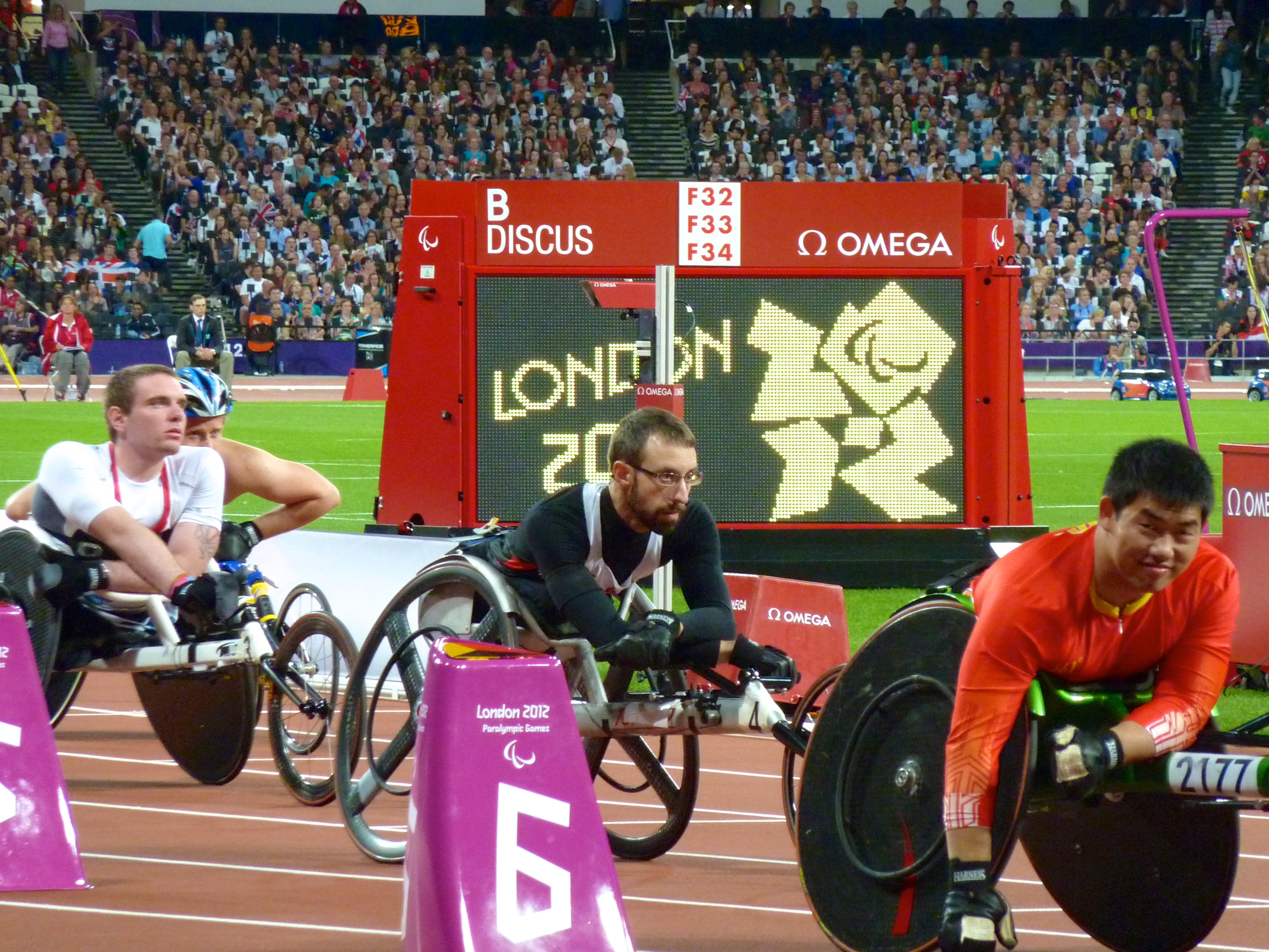
- Yufei (right) at the start of the 200m T53 final at the London 2012 PAralympics

Personal information
- Born: January 18, 1989 (age 37) Shijiazhuang, China

Sport
- Event: sprint
- Club: Hebei Province
- Coached by: Tian Yuchuan
Medal record
Track and field (T53)
Representing China
Paralympic Games
Silver medal – second place	2012 London	100m – T53
Bronze medal – third place	2012 London	200m – T53

Zhao Yufei (born January 18, 1989) is a Paralympian athlete from China competing mainly in category T53 sprint events. Yufei competed in the 2012 Summer Paralympics in London where he won a silver in the 100m and bronze in the 200m.
