= Amberlynn Weber =

American Paralympic athlete

Personal information
- Full name: Amberlynn Christine Weber
- Nickname: Bee
- Nationality: United States
- Born: 1993 (age 32–33) Missoula, Montana, U.S.
- Height: 5 ft 1 in (155 cm)
Medal record
Women's athletics (track and field)
Representing United States
Paralympic Games
| Gold medal – first place | 2011 Guadalajara | 200 metres T54 |
| Gold medal – first place | 2011 Guadalajara | 400 metres T54 |
| Gold medal – first place | 2011 Guadalajara | 800 metre T54 |
| Bronze medal – third place | 2011 Guadalajara | 100 metres T54 |

Amberlynn Weber (born 1993) is an American Paralympic track and fielder. At the 2011 Parapan American Games, she won gold medals in 100 m, 400 m, and 800 m and a bronze medal in 200 m. She also recently took home a gold medal in the Texas Regional Games. She is a dog lover, foodie, fishing enthusiast, and currently drives a 2015 honda fit.
