= Raza point score system =

Scoring method in Paralympic athletics

The Raza point score system is a method in Paralympic athletics field competitions for comparing throws or jumps by athletes of differing levels of disability. In events where athletes of multiple different classifications compete, performances are converted to point scores by a formula which accounts for the athletes' classifications. This means that a more disabled athlete may beat a less disabled competitor with a slightly shorter throw or jump.

== Formula ==
The formula is a Gompertz function:

$\text{points} = q = ae^{-e^{b-cp} }$

Where $p$ is the performance in metres, and $a$, $b$, and $c$ are constants. Presently, $a$ (the maximum possible score) is 1200 points in all cases, $b$ varies between events (with men's and women's events of the same discipline having different values), whilst differing values of $c$ distinguish the different classifications for each event. These constants are reviewed by the International Paralympic Committee annually. The constants are set such that the world's best athletes will achieve scores of around 1000 points.

The Raza Points System is designed to be reversible, such that an athlete can know the performance ($p$) they require for a particular point score ($q$). The reversed form of the formula is:

$\text{performance} = p = \frac{b - \ln{\left( \ln{\left( \frac{a}{q} \right)} \right)} }{c}$

=== Example ===
For the F35/36 woman's discus throw at the 2012 Paralympics the coefficients were as follows:

Class	a	b	c
F35	1181.867462	2.482113	0.148
F36	1181.867462	2.482113	0.160

The gold and silver medallists were Wu Qing and Mariia Pomazan respectively. Wu's classification was F36, meaning that her best throw of 28.01 m scored 1032 points. Pomazan's F35 classification meant that her longer throw of 30.12 m scored 1028 points, placing her behind Wu in the final standings.

== History ==
The Raza point score system replaced a system used before 2010 which based its calculation on the current World Record and the top performances at the most recent Paralympic Games and World Championships. This system had the disadvantage of discouraging top athletes from setting world records, as this would effectively disadvantage them in future events.

The system was developed by and is named after, Masoom Raza, a Performance Technology Analyst for UK Athletics.

The system was used at the 2012 Paralympics. The use of outdated coefficients for the F35/36 Women's discus resulted in medals being initially incorrectly awarded. This case, with the correct coefficients, is used as the example above.

For the 2016 Paralympic Games the IPC did not choose any combined classification events that required the Raza system.

== See also ==
- Factor system in para-alpine skiing
- Factoring in paralympic cycling
