= Athletics at the 2012 Summer Paralympics – Women's javelin throw =

The Women's javelin throw athletics events for the 2012 Summer Paralympics took place at the London Olympic Stadium from August 31 to September 8. A total of 6 events were contested over this distance for 14 different classifications.

== Results ==
=== F12/13 ===
Rank	Athlete	Nationality	Class	1	2	3	4	5	6	Result	Score	Notes
1st place, gold medalist(s)	Tanja Dragić	Serbia	F12	37.45	42.51	37.10	38.73	38.77	40.14	42.51	1039	WR
2nd place, silver medalist(s)	Anna Sorokina	Russia	F12	36.80	x	32.10	35.92	37.20	38.79	38.79	1008	PB
3rd place, bronze medalist(s)	Natalija Eder	Austria	F12	32.81	38.03	32.38	33.94	31.99	30.43	38.03	1000	PB
4	Rebeca Valenzuela	Mexico	F12	x	34.17	x	x	x	x	34.17	950	RR
5	Ya-Ting Liu	Chinese Taipei	F13	32.68	x	33.65	31.33	x	32.61	33.65	883	PR
6	Jessica Gallagher	Australia	F13	32.03	33.56	31.34	26.78	33.25	33.30	33.56	882	
7	Marija Vidaček	Croatia	F12	x	x	22.74	27.05	x	23.62	27.05	795	
8	Rose Welepa	Greece	F12	24.29	20.00	19.02	20.07	17.66	15.65	24.29	708	PB
9	Ting-Fen Tung	Chinese Taipei	F13	21.12	21.02	20.34				21.12	508	PB

=== F33/34/52/53 ===
Rank	Athlete	Nationality	Class	1	2	3	4	5	6	Best	Notes
1st place, gold medalist(s)	Birgit Kober	Germany	F34	24.29	25.17	x	x	25.66	27.03	27.03	WR
2nd place, silver medalist(s)	Marie Brämer-Skowronek	Germany	F34	19.47	20.43	19.56	19.23	20.25	19.93	20.43	SB
3rd place, bronze medalist(s)	Marjaana Huovinen	Finland	F34	19.47	x	19.17	x	17.97	x	19.47	PB
4	Yousra Ben Jemaa	Tunisia	F34	18.63	x	17.61	17.90	18.26	x	18.63	RR
5	Frances Herrmann	Germany	F34	17.99	18.62	x	18.31	18.00	17.86	18.62	PB
6	Veronika Doronina	Russia	F34	x	16.57	18.40	16.94	17.82	x	18.40	
7	Estela Salas	Mexico	F53	11.40	x	x	x	11.22	x	11.40	PB
8	Zandile Nhlapo	South Africa	F34	x	x	15.43	x	x	x	15.43	SB
9	Esther Rivera	Mexico	F53	10.87	x	11.07	-	-	-	11.07	
10	Brydee Moore	Australia	F33	10.50	10.55	x	-	-	-	10.55	
11	Thuraya Alzaabi	United Arab Emirates	F34	11.95	12.85	11.91	-	-	-	12.85	
12	Elena Burdykina	Russia	F34	11.94	11.49	12.61	-	-	-	12.61	
13	Fatema Nedham	Bahrain	F53	6.00	6.07	x	-	-	-	6.07	SB

=== F37/38 ===
Rank	Athlete	Nationality	Class	1	2	3	4	5	6	Result	Score	Notes
1st place, gold medalist(s)	Shirlene Coelho	Brazil	F37	37.86	35.92	34.04	36.05	31.19	36.03	37.86	1015	WR
2nd place, silver medalist(s)	Jia Qianqian	China	F37	30.50	27.91	30.89	x	31.62	28.47	31.62	946	RR
3rd place, bronze medalist(s)	Georgia Beikoff	Australia	F37	29.84	27.06	28.67	25.42	25.09	26.90	29.84	914	RR
4	Na Mi	China	F37	25.51	28.48	x	x	27.17	26.90	28.48	886	SB
5	Yomaira Cohen	Venezuela	F37	25.80	25.23	x	25.22	26.27	x	26.27	829	PB
6	Daniela Vratilova	Czech Republic	F38	25.64	23.71	25.44	25.53	25.93	24.70	25.93	793	
7	Eva Berná	Czech Republic	F37	19.46	20.51	19.48	20.35	19.91	20.88	20.88	632	

=== F46 ===
Rank	Athlete	Nationality	1	2	3	4	5	6	Result	Notes
1st place, gold medalist(s)	Katarzyna Piekart	Poland	35.41	37.36	37.84	37.84	41.15	38.51	41.15	WR
2nd place, silver medalist(s)	Nataliya Gudkova	Russia	36.44	39.89	41.08	38.43	38.42	38.04	41.08	PB
3rd place, bronze medalist(s)	Madeleine Hogan	Australia	34.98	37.52	38.38	36.89	36.01	38.85	38.85	PB
4	Hongmei Zhao	China	x	36.43	37.20	38.41	37.42	37.26	38.41	RR
5	Hollie Arnold	Great Britain	29.42	30.30	33.43	30.28	33.38	36.27	36.27	PB
6	Laura Darimont	Germany	x	32.24	32.41	27.36	33.54	31.22	33.54	PB
7	Holly Robinson	New Zealand	28.44	29.91	32.58	30.15	31.31	31.45	32.58	PB
8	Mariel Bethancourt	Venezuela	x	x	29.99	29.76	29.93	29.86	29.99	PB
9	Surang Khamsuk	Thailand	29.09	x	28.75				29.09	PB
10	Mariam Matroushi	United Arab Emirates	25.38	x	x				25.38	

=== F54/55/56 ===
Rank	Athlete	Nationality	Class	1	2	3	4	5	6	Best	Notes
1st place, gold medalist(s)	Yang Liwan	China	F54	17.54	x	17.76	17.89	17.68	17.35	17.89	WR
2nd place, silver medalist(s)	Hania Aidi	Tunisia	F54	16.91	17.28	17.40	16.74	16.92	17.14	17.40	RR
3rd place, bronze medalist(s)	Martina Willing	Germany	F56	22.61	23.12	x	21.60	21.81	20.69	23.12	
4	Ntombizanele Situ	South Africa	F54	15.47	16.22	16.19	15.26	15.60	x	16.22	
5	Angela Madsen	United States	F56	19.08	19.57	21.20	17.57	18.44	19.93	21.20	RR
6	Daniela Todorova	Bulgaria	F55	18.44	17.86	x	17.97	x	19.25	19.25	PB
7	Tanja Cerkvenik	Slovenia	F55	18.40	18.64	x	17.42	x	x	18.64	
8	Tatjana Majcen	Slovenia	F54	11.69	13.49	x	12.90	x	13.09	13.49	
9	Yanive Torres Martinez	Colombia	F54	x	13.03	12.80	-	-	-	13.03	RR
10	Milka Milinkovic	Croatia	F55	13.98	14.50	14.34	-	-	-	14.50	
11	Ruth Aguilar Fulgencio	Spain	F55	10.82	11.45	12.12	-	-	-	12.12	
12	Kadidjatou Amadou	Niger	F56	10.81	11.63	11.29	-	-	-	11.63	SB
-	Marites Burce	Philippines	F54	x	x	x	-	-	-	NM	

=== F57/58 ===
Rank	Athlete	Nationality	Class	1	2	3	4	5	6	Best	Score	Notes
1st place, gold medalist(s)	Liu Ming	China	F57	20.99	21.52	x	18.97	x	23.48	23.48	955	RR
2nd place, silver medalist(s)	Safia Djelal	Algeria	F58	x	27.46	28.87	23.29	x	26.40	28.87	953	PB
3rd place, bronze medalist(s)	Larisa Volik	Russia	F57	x	21.95	x	x	x	x	21.95	906	RR
4	Thi Hai Nguyen	Vietnam	F58	23.69	23.66	24.00	25.04	24.66	25.37	25.37	851	PB
5	Qing Suping	China	F57	18.89	20.42	x	18.85	19.41	20.12	20.42	845	SB
6	Olga Sergienko	Russia	F57	x	x	19.96	x	x	x	19.96	824	
7	Eucharia Iyiazi	Nigeria	F58	x	x	24.04	19.28	23.45	x	24.04	801	PB
8	Sylvia Grant	Jamaica	F57	x	18.71	x	18.78	18.85	19.06	19.06	780	SB
9	Li Ling	China	F57	18.63	x	18.32	-	-	-	18.63	757	SB
10	Siham Alrasheedy	United Arab Emirates	F57	18.21	17.35	x	-	-	-	18.21	733	
11	Jeny Velazco Reyes	Mexico	F58	20.54	20.98	22.37	-	-	-	22.37	728	SB
12	Yeni Aide Hernandez Mendieta	Mexico	F57	17.96	x	x	-	-	-	17.96	719	
13	Mary Nakhumicha Zakayo	Kenya	F57	x	x	16.86	-	-	-	16.86	650	SB
14	Cece Mazyck	United States	F57	x	15.45	x	-	-	-	15.45	554	
15	Evelyne Tuitavake	France	F58	x	x	18.27	-	-	-	18.27	506	
16	Ivanka Koleva	Bulgaria	F57	13.64	14.73	14.24	-	-	-	14.73	501	
17	Nephtalie Jean Louis	Haiti	F57	9.98	10.69	8.92	-	-	-	10.69	207	SB
18	Fatimetou Mamadou Mbodj	Mauritania	F58	7.10	7.59	x	-	-	-	7.59	23	SB
