= Athletics at the 2012 Summer Paralympics – Men's club throw =

Men's club throw at the XIV Paralympic Games
- Venue: London Olympic Stadium
- Date: 31 August 2012
- Competitors: 17 from 12 nations

Medalists
1st place, gold medalist(s)		Željko Dimitrijević	Serbia
2nd place, silver medalist(s)		Radim Běleš	Czech Republic
3rd place, bronze medalist(s)		Lahouari Bahlaz	Algeria

The men's club throw athletics event for the 2012 Summer Paralympics took place at the London Olympic Stadium in London on 31 August. A single event incorporating 3 different classifications (F31, F32, and F51) were contested.

== F31/32/51 results ==
Rank	Athlete	Nationality	Class	1	2	3	4	5	6	Best	Score	Notes
1st place, gold medalist(s)	Željko Dimitrijević	Serbia	F51	26.88	26.25	26.67	–	–	–	26.88	1010	
2nd place, silver medalist(s)	Radim Běleš	Czech Republic	F51	23.84	23.20	x	x	26.67	25.92	26.67	1004	
3rd place, bronze medalist(s)	Lahouari Bahlaz	Algeria	F32	31.36	36.31	32.85	30.58	34.45	32.72	36.31	1003	
4	Jan Vaněk	Czech Republic	F51	24.99	24.89	24.77	25.16	24.15	24.86	25.16	953	
5	Martin Zvolánek	Czech Republic	F51	23.52	24.88	X	23.63	23.63	X	24.88	943	
6	Mohamed Zemzemi	Tunisia	F51	23.76	X	X	24.63	X	24.19	24.63	933	
7	Miroslav Matic	Croatia	F51	X	23.75	23.45	23.19	X	24.03	24.03	909	
8	Karim Betina	Algeria	F32	29.75	X	27.32	X	28.31	27.91	29.75	906	
9	Maciej Sochal	Poland	F32	23.58	28.04	29.04	DNQ			29.04	891	
10	Hamza G Elhmali	Libya	F32	X	X	28.29	DNQ			28.29	875	
11	Stephen Miller	Great Britain	F32	26.70	26.54	26.70	DNQ			26.70	837	
12	Jože Flere	Slovenia	F51	21.32	21.10	20.84	DNQ			21.32	780	
13	Frantisek Serbus	Czech Republic	F32	X	24.04	23.15	DNQ			24.04	763	
14	Slaven Hudina	Croatia	F32	X	X	23.09	DNQ			23.09	733	
15	John McCarthy	Ireland	F51	19.52	X	20.36	DNQ			20.36	727	
16	Nikolaos Kaplanis	Greece	F51	18.39	18.82	X	DNQ			18.82	634	
–	Youssef Ouaddali	Morocco	F32	X	X	X	DNQ			NM	–	
