= Athletics at the 2012 Summer Paralympics – Women's club throw =

The Women's club throw athletics event for the 2012 Summer Paralympics took place at the London Olympic Stadium on 1 September. One event was contested for 3 different classifications.

== Results ==
=== F31/32/51 ===
Rank	Athlete	Nationality	Class	1	2	3	4	5	6	Result	Score	Notes
1st place, gold medalist(s)	Maroua Ibrahmi	Tunisia	F32	19.46	23.43	17.79	19.92	22.93	20.80	23.43	1064	WR
2nd place, silver medalist(s)	Mounia Gasmi	Algeria	F32	19.99	20.48	22.16	20.34	22.51	21.56	22.51	1052	PB
3rd place, bronze medalist(s)	Gemma Prescott	Great Britain	F32	17.58	18.97	20.50	18.32	19.41	20.17	20.50	1015	RR
4	Catherine O'Neill	Ireland	F51	13.46	x	13.64	11.52	12.65	13.05	13.64	931	
5	Josie Pearson	Great Britain	F51	12.65	12.79	x	x	11.76	13.42	13.42	919	PB
6	Maria Stamatoula	Greece	F32	15.74	16.68	15.64	7.14	14.72	15.26	16.68	891	
7	Saida Nayli	Tunisia	F32	x	16.43	15.49	14.50	x	13.91	16.43	879	
8	Louise Ellery	Australia	F32	14.46	15.24	x	x	14.73	x	15.24	818	
9	Sunjeong Kim	South Korea	F31	x	x	10.98				10.98	800	WR
10	Sakina Albalooshi	United Arab Emirates	F32	14.66	14.45	14.12				14.66	783	
11	Zena Cole	United States	F51	9.55	10.33	11.02				11.02	751	
12	Maxine Moore	Great Britain	F32	12.07	11.71	13.53				13.53	708	
13	Dhouha Chelhi	Tunisia	F51	8.21	x	8.29				8.29	468	
