= Athletics at the 2012 Summer Paralympics F40 =

Athletics at the XIV Paralympic Games
- Paralympic Athletics
- Venue: Olympic Stadium; The Mall
- Dates: 31 August – 9 September 2012
- Competitors: 1100 (740 men, 360 women)

Athletics events at the 2012 Summer Paralympics were held in the Olympic Stadium and in The Mall in London, United Kingdom, from 31 August to 9 September 2012. Five throwing events were staged for class F40, athletes with dwarfism.

== Classification ==
Athletes were given a classification depending on the type and extent of their disability. The classification system allowed athletes to compete against others with a similar level of function.

The athletics classifications are:

- 11–13: Blind (11) and visually impaired (12, 13) athletes
- 20: Athletes with an intellectual disability
- 31–38: Athletes with cerebral palsy
- 40: Les Autres (others) (including people with dwarfism)
- 42–46: Amputees
- 51–58: Athletes with a spinal cord disability

The class numbers were given prefixes of "T" and "F" for track and field events, respectively.

== Medal summary ==
=== Men's events ===
Event	Gold	Silver	Bronze
Shot put	Wang Zhiming; China	Hocine Gherzouli; Algeria	Paschalis Stathelakos; Greece
Discus throw	Wang Zhiming; China	Paschalis Stathelakos; Greece	Jonathan De Souza Santos; Brazil
Javelin throw	Wang Zhiming; China	Ahmed Naas; Iraq	Wildan Nukhailawi; Iraq

=== Women's events ===
Event	Gold	Silver	Bronze
Shot put	Raoua Tlili; Tunisia	Meng Genjimisu; China	Najat El Garaa; Morocco
Discus throw	Najat El Garaa; Morocco	Raoua Tlili; Tunisia	Meng Genjimisu; China

== See also ==
- Athletics at the 2012 Summer Olympics
