= Athletics at the 2012 Summer Paralympics – Men's 800 metres =

The Men's 800m athletics events for the 2012 Summer Paralympics took place at the London Olympic Stadium from August 31 to September 8. A total of 8 events were contested over this distance for 8 different classifications.

== Schedule ==
R	Round 1	½	Semifinals	F	Final

Event↓/Date →	Fri 31	Sat 1	Sun 2	Mon 3	Tue 4	Wed 5	Thr 6		Fri 7	Sat 8
T12 800m				R		F				
T13 800m									R	F
T36 800m						R	F			
T37 800m	R	F								
T46 800m							R			F
T52 800m							R		F	
T53 800m					R	F				
T54 800m					R		½	F		

== Results ==
=== T12 ===
The T12 category is for athletes with visual impairment. Athletes in this category will generally have some residual sight, the ability to recognise the shape of a hand at a distance of 2 metres and the ability to perceive clearly will be no more than 2/60. T12 athletes commonly run with guides.

Final

Competed 5 September 2012 at 19:35.

Rank	Athlete	Country	Time	Notes
1st place, gold medalist(s)	Abderrahim Zhiou	Tunisia	1:56.42	
2nd place, silver medalist(s)	Egor Sharov	Russia	1:56.65	
3rd place, bronze medalist(s)	David Devine	Great Britain	1:58.72	
4	Lazaro Rashid	Cuba	1:58.76	

=== T13 ===
The T13 category is for athletes with a moderate visual impairment. Athletes in this category have a variety of visual impairments, but can typically recognize contours from a distance of 2 to 6 metres. Athletes in this category do not typically require a guide.

Final

Competed 8 September 2012 at 11:55.

Rank	Athlete	Country	Time	Notes
1st place, gold medalist(s)	Abdellatif Baka	Algeria	1:53.01	PR
2nd place, silver medalist(s)	David Korir	Kenya	1:53.16	PB
3rd place, bronze medalist(s)	Abdelillah Mame	Morocco	1:53.40	PB
4	Lukasz Wietecki	Poland	1:55.44	
5	Tim Prendergast	New Zealand	1:55.85	PB
6	Alexey Akhtyamov	Russia	1:57.33	
7	Juan Carlos Arcos Lira	Mexico	1:58.11	
	Zine Eddine Sekhri	Algeria	DQ	

=== T36 ===
The T36 category is for ambulant athletes with cerebral palsy. These athletes do not have the capacity to remain still and they show involuntary movements with all four limbs affected. They usually walk without assistive devices.

There were no heats in this event. The final was competed on 6 September 2012 at 19:24.

Final

Competed 6 September 2012 at 19:24.

Rank	Athlete	Country	Time	Notes
1st place, gold medalist(s)	Evgenii Shvetcov	Russia	2:05.32	PR
2nd place, silver medalist(s)	Artem Arefyev	Russia	2:06.13	PB
3rd place, bronze medalist(s)	Paul Blake	Great Britain	2:08.24	
4	Pavel Kharagezov	Russia	2:12.47	PB
5	Jose Manuel Gonzalez	Spain	2:15.99	
6	Jose Pampano	Spain	2:21.48	
7	Gabriel De Jesus Cuadra Holman	Nicaragua	2:23.93	RR
8	Fabio Gutierrez Torres	Colombia	2:30.20	

=== T37 ===
The T37 category is for ambulant athletes with cerebral palsy. These athletes have movement and coordination problems on one half of their body. They have good ability in their dominant side of their body (ie hemiplegia).

There were no heats in this event. The final was competed on 1 September 2012 at 20:58.

Final

Competed 1 September 2012 at 20:58.

Rank	Athlete	Country	Time	Notes
1st place, gold medalist(s)	Michael McKillop	Ireland	1:57.22	WR
2nd place, silver medalist(s)	Mohamed Charmi	Tunisia	2:01.45	RR
3rd place, bronze medalist(s)	Brad Scott	Australia	2:02.04	RR
4	Madjid Djemai	Algeria	2:04.93	
5	Oleksandr Driha	Ukraine	2:06.17	PB
6	Charl du Toit	South Africa	2:06.67	
7	Faycel Othmani	Tunisia	2:09.35	PB
8	Khaled Hanani	Algeria	2:14.31	
9	Djamel Mastouri	France	2:23.66	

=== T46 ===
The T46 category is for athletes who have a single above or below elbow amputation or similar disability, with normal function in both legs.

Final

Competed 8 September 2012 at 21:02.

Rank	Athlete	Country	Time	Notes
1st place, gold medalist(s)	Gunther Matzinger	Austria	1:51.82	WR
2nd place, silver medalist(s)	Samir Nouioua	Algeria	1:52.33	RR
3rd place, bronze medalist(s)	Abraham Tarbei	Kenya	1:53.03	SB
4	Mohamed Fouzai	Tunisia	1:54.94	PB
5	Abdelhadi El Harti	Morocco	1:56.19	PB
6	Jonah Kipkemoi Chesum	Kenya	1:56.57	
7	Stanley Cheruiyot	Kenya	2:03.78	
	Hermas Muvunyi	Rwanda	DQ	

=== T52 ===
The T52 category is for wheelchair athletes with damage to spinal cord in the higher parts of the back, substantially impaired or no trunk function, and minimal or no leg function. Pushing power comes from elbow extensions, and appears close to normal except for use of modified gloves to compensate for grip.

There were no heats in this event. The final was competed on 7 September 2012 at 20:39.

Final

Competed 7 September 2012 at 20:39.

Rank	Athlete	Country	Time	Notes
1st place, gold medalist(s)	Raymond Martin	United States	2:00.34	
2nd place, silver medalist(s)	Tomoya Ito	Japan	2:00.62	SB
3rd place, bronze medalist(s)	Leonardo De Jesus Perez Juarez	Mexico	2:01.18	PB
4	Toshihiro Takada	Japan	2:02.64	SB
5	Thomas Geierspichler	Austria	2:05.35	SB
6	Cristian Torres	Colombia	2:09.45	PB
7	Hirokazu Ueyonabaru	Japan	2:11.05	SB
8	Josh Roberts	United States	2:18.57	

=== T53 ===
The T53 category is for wheelchair athletes with normal use of arms and hands, no or limited trunk function, and no leg function.

Final

Competed 5 September 2012 at 19:43.

Rank	Athlete	Country	Time	Notes
1st place, gold medalist(s)	Richard Colman	Australia	1:41.13	
2nd place, silver medalist(s)	Brent Lakatos	Canada	1:41.24	PB
3rd place, bronze medalist(s)	Joshua George	United States	1:41.50	
4	Li Huzhao	China	1:41.83	
5	Yoo Byunghoon	South Korea	1:42.44	
6	Jun Hiromichi	Japan	1:42.99	
7	Pierre Fairbank	France	1:43.02	
8	Brian Siemann	United States	1:43.09	

=== T54 ===
The T54 category is for wheelchair athletes with no leg function, but near full arm function and reasonable to normal trunk function. Typically this may be caused by a lower spinal cord injury or spinal cord birth defect.

Final

Competed 6 September 2012 at 21:16.

Rank	Athlete	Country	Time	Notes
1st place, gold medalist(s)	David Weir	Great Britain	1:37.63	
2nd place, silver medalist(s)	Marcel Hug	Switzerland	1:37.84	
3rd place, bronze medalist(s)	Saichon Konjen	Thailand	1:38.51	
4	Kim Gyu Dae	South Korea	1:39.03	
5	Josh Cassidy	Canada	1:39.72	
6	Jordan Bird	United States	1:40.17	
	Julien Casoli	France	DNF	
	Zhang Lixin	China	DQ	
