= Athletics at the 2012 Summer Paralympics – Women's marathon =

The Women's marathon event for the 2012 Summer Paralympics took place at the London Olympic Stadium on 9 September. There is only one classification for this event: T54, for wheelchair athletes.

== Results ==
=== T54 ===
Rank	Name	Nationality	Time	Notes
1st place, gold medalist(s)	Shirley Reilly	United States	1:46:33	
2nd place, silver medalist(s)	Shelly Woods	Great Britain	1:46:34	
3rd place, bronze medalist(s)	Sandra Graf	Switzerland	1:46:35	
4	Amanda McGrory	United States	1:46:35	
5	Wakako Tsuchida	Japan	1:49:02	
6	Christie Dawes	Australia	1:49:37	
7	Diane Roy	Canada	1:53:02	
8	Susannah Scaroni	United States	1:58:37	
9	Tatyana McFadden	United States	1:58:47	
10	Patricia Keller	Switzerland	2:06:07	
	Edith Wolf	Switzerland	DNF	
	Christina Schwab	United States	DNF	
