= Athletics at the 2012 Summer Paralympics – Men's marathon =

The Men's marathon athletics events for the 2012 Summer Paralympics took place at the London Olympic Stadium from 31 August to 8 September. A total of 3 events were contested over this distance for 3 different classifications.

== Results ==
=== T12 ===
Rank	Name	Nationality	Time	Notes
1st place, gold medalist(s)	Alberto Suárez Laso	Spain	2:24:50	WR
2nd place, silver medalist(s)	Elkin Serna	Colombia	2:26:39	RR
3rd place, bronze medalist(s)	Abderrahim Zhiou	Tunisia	2:26:56	RR
4	Masahiro Okamura	Japan	2:28:51	RR
5	Shinya Wada	Japan	2:40:08	SB
6	Gabriel Macchi	Portugal	2:40:13	SB
7	Yuichi Takahashi	Japan	2:42:09	SB
8	Joaquim Machado	Portugal	2:43:17	
9	Ildar Pomykalov	Russia	2:43:38	SB
10	Andrea Cionna	Italy	2:43:59	SB
11	Hatem Nasrallah	Tunisia	2:57:08	SB
12	Csaba Orban	Hungary	3:01:02	
13	Gad Yarkoni	Israel	3:01:51	
14	José Luis Santero	Argentina	3:09:09	
	Nacer-Eddine Karfas	Algeria	DNF	
	Jorge Pina (athlete)	Portugal	DQ	
	Henry Wanyoike	Kenya	DNF	
	Cristian Valenzuela	Chile	DNS	
	Igor Khavlin	Russia	DQ	

=== T46 ===
Rank	Name	Nationality	Time	Notes
1st place, gold medalist(s)	Tito Sena	Brazil	2:30:40	PB
2nd place, silver medalist(s)	Abderrahman Ait Khamouch	Spain	2:31:04	
3rd place, bronze medalist(s)	Frederic Van den Heede	Belgium	2:31:38	PB
4	Ozivam Bonfim	Brazil	2:37:16	SB
5	Walter Endrizzi	Italy	2:39:32	SB
6	Pedro Zempoaltecatl	Mexico	2:41:59	PB
7	Lei Zhang	China	2:44:19	SB
8	Alessandro Di Lello	Italy	2:46:27	
9	Mario Santillan Hernandez	Mexico	2:48:55	SB
10	Chris Hammer	United States	2:50:30	SB
11	Christoph Sommer	Switzerland	3:01:42	

=== T54 ===
Rank	Name	Nationality	Time	Notes
1st place, gold medalist(s)	David Weir	Great Britain	1:30:20	
2nd place, silver medalist(s)	Marcel Hug	Switzerland	1:30:21	
3rd place, bronze medalist(s)	Kurt Fearnley	Australia	1:30:21	
4	Masazumi Soejima	Japan	1:30:24	
5	Nobukazu Hanaoka	Japan	1:30:26	
6	Kota Hokinoue	Japan	1:31:13	
7	Gyu Dae Kim	South Korea	1:31:32	
8	Tomasz Hamerlak	Poland	1:31:34	
9	Rafael Jimenez	Spain	1:33:05	
10	Krige Schabort	United States	1:33:05	
11	Heinz Frei	Switzerland	1:33:06	
12	Josh Cassidy	Canada	1:33:06	
13	Masayuki Higuchi	Japan	1:33:07	
14	Denis Lemeunier	France	1:33:07	
15	Aaron Martinez	Mexico	1:35:32	
16	Aaron Pike	United States	1:36:26	
17	Nathan Arkley	Australia	1:36:53	
18	Alain Fuss	France	1:39:28	
19	Sukman Hong	South Korea	1:39:41	
20	Joshua George	United States	1:39:56	
21	Choke Yasuoka	Japan	1:40:26	
22	Hiroyuki Yamamoto	Japan	1:40:54	
23	Saúl Hernández	Mexico	1:44:16	
24	Adam Bleakney	United States	1:44:16	
25	Brian Siemann	United States	1:45:51	
26	Michel Filteau	Canada	1:47:39	
27	Ryan Chalmers	United States	1:48:25	
28	Laurens Sibaja	Costa Rica	1:48:34	
–	Chengming Liu	China	DNF	
–	Julien Casoli	France	DNS	
–	Pierre Fairbank	France	DNF	
–	Roger Verdaguer	Spain	DNF	
