= Athletics at the 2012 Summer Paralympics T/F20 =

Athletics at the XIV Paralympic Games
- Paralympic Athletics
- Venue: Olympic Stadium; The Mall
- Dates: 31 August – 9 September 2012
- Competitors: 1100 (740 men, 360 women)

Athletics events at the 2012 Summer Paralympics were held in the Olympic Stadium and in The Mall in London, United Kingdom, from 31 August to 9 September 2012. A restricted number of events were held in the stadium for athletes with intellectual impairment.

== Classification ==
Athletes were given a classification depending on the type and extent of their disability. The classification system allowed athletes to compete against others with a similar level of function.

The athletics classifications are:

- 11–13: Blind (11) and visually impaired (12, 13) athletes
- 20: Athletes with an intellectual disability
- 31–38: Athletes with cerebral palsy
- 40: Les Autres (others) (including people with dwarfism)
- 42–46: Amputees
- 51–58: Athletes with a spinal cord disability

The class numbers were given prefixes of "T" and "F" for track and field events, respectively.

== Medal summary ==
=== Men's events ===
| Event | Classification | Gold | Silver | Bronze |
|---|---|---|---|---|
| 1500 m | T20 | Peyman Nasiri Bazanjani; Iran | Daniel Pek; Poland | Rafal Korc; Poland |
| Long jump | F20 | Jose Antonio Exposito Pineiro; Spain | Zoran Talic; Croatia | Lenine Cunha; Portugal |
| Shot put | F20 | Todd Hodgetts; Australia | Jeffrey Ige; Sweden | Muhammad Ziyad Zolkefli; Malaysia |

=== Women's events ===
| Event | Classification | Gold | Silver | Bronze |
|---|---|---|---|---|
| 1500 m | T20 | Barbara Niewiedzial (Guide); Poland | Arleta Meloch (Guide); Poland | Ilona Biacsi (Guide); Hungary |
| Long jump | F20 | Karolina Kucharczyk; Poland | Krestina Zhukova; Russia | Mikela Ristoski; Croatia |
| Shot put | F20 | Ewa Durska; Poland | Anastasiia Mysnyk; Ukraine | Svitlana Kudelya; Ukraine |

== See also ==
- Athletics at the 2012 Summer Olympics
