= Athletics at the 2012 Summer Paralympics – Women's discus throw =

The Women's discus throw athletics events for the 2012 Summer Paralympics took place at the London Olympic Stadium from 31 August to 8 September. A total of 6 events were contested over this distance for 11 different classifications.

== Results ==
=== F11/12 ===
Rank	Athlete	Nationality	Class	1	2	3	4	5	6	Best	Score	Notes
1st place, gold medalist(s)	Liangmin Zhang	China	F11	38.41	38.81	38.11	40.13	38.22	38.54	40.13	997	PR
2nd place, silver medalist(s)	Hongxia Tang	China	F11	35.32	34.06	32.91	37.83	39.91	39.81	39.91	994	PB
3rd place, bronze medalist(s)	Claire Williams	Great Britain	F12	33.91	39.12	38.90	39.63	36.85	33.68	39.63	908	
4	Siena Christen	Germany	F12	36.86	37.65	37.46	37.56	36.23	38.42	38.42	884	SB
5	Tamara Sivakova	Belarus	F12	23.07	36.81	x	35.43	37.61	36.10	37.61	867	PB
6	Elizabeth Almada	Argentina	F12	x	36.52	35.08	35.96	36.38	x	36.52	843	
7	Orysia Ilchyna	Ukraine	F12	35.29	x	34.14	32.63	34.84	32.17	35.29	814	
8	Assunta Legnante	Italy	F11	x	23.33	30.81	23.92	x	25.35	30.81	799	
9	Marija Iveković-Meštrović	Croatia	F12	33.77	x	x	–	–	–	33.77	776	
10	Hamela Devi Enikutty	Malaysia	F12	x	28.31	28.74	–	–	–	28.74	630	
11	Rita Elena Osorio Cota	Mexico	F11	19.60	5.00	x	–	–	–	19.60	404	PB
12	Shiho Watanabe	Japan	F11	x	18.10	18.66	–	–	–	18.66	367	
13	Ailish Dunne	Ireland	F11	18.38	18.24	x	–	–	–	18.38	356	

=== F35/36 ===
Rank	Athlete	Nationality	Class	1	2	3	4	5	6	Best	Score	Notes
1st place, gold medalist(s)	Qing Wu	China	F36	25.56	28.01	25.43	27.30	26.26	25.08	28.01	1032	WR
2nd place, silver medalist(s)	Mariia Pomazan	Ukraine	F35	29.46	29.51	30.12	27.97	28.88	28.31	30.12	1028	WR
3rd place, bronze medalist(s)	Katherine Proudfoot	Australia	F36	x	21.49	24.87	25.22	20.35	23.39	25.22	956	
4	Jiongyu Bao	China	F35	25.85	x	24.30	x	23.26	25.12	25.85	910	RR
5	Renata Chilewska	Poland	F35	23.58	25.80	25.39	25.46	24.90	25.22	25.80	908	
6	Chenelle van Zyl	South Africa	F35	24.38	23.80	24.26	24.01	23.71	24.57	24.57	862	
7	Marivana Oliveira	Brazil	F35	x	x	22.96	22.65	23.73	22.72	23.73	827	RR
8	Alla Malchyk	Ukraine	F36	20.49	21.63	20.71	–	–	–	21.63	811	SB
9	Martha Liliana Hernandez Florian	Colombia	F35	17.59	18.77	21.40	19.34	17.06	19.25	21.40	713	PB
10	Perla Muñoz	Argentina	F35	17.70	16.70	17.09	–	–	–	17.70	494	

=== F37 ===
Rank	Athlete	Nationality	1	2	3	4	5	6	Best	Notes
1	Na Mi	China	35.35	x	33.69	30.71	31.88	31.52	35.35	WR
2	Qiuping Xu	China	31.25	31.24	x	31.09	x	32.08	32.08	PB
3	Beverley Jones	Great Britain	26.46	27.44	30.04	29.91	x	30.99	30.99	SB
4	Viktorya Yasevych	Ukraine	29.06	x	27.46	x	29.79	x	29.79	PB
5	Shirlene Coelho	Brazil	21.62	25.44	26.12	x	24.91	27.58	27.58	SB
6	Qianqian Jia	China	25.59	22.53	24.81	26.37	24.21	27.17	27.17	SB
7	Yomaira Cohen	Venezuela	24.12	26.24	x	24.65	24.87	25.88	26.24	PB
8	Eva Berná	Czech Republic	24.77	x	24.36	x	24.30	23.79	24.77	
9	Taiga Kantāne	Latvia	23.84	23.94	x	–	–	–	23.94	

=== F40 ===
Rank	Athlete	Nationality	1	2	3	4	5	6	Best	Notes
1	Najat El Garaa	Morocco	29.18	29.95	28.87	29.18	32.37	29.67	32.37	WR
2	Raoua Tlili	Tunisia	31.16	x	x	30.09	x	28.76	31.16	PB
3	Menggenjimisu	China	30.44	30.15	29.34	29.33	28.56	x	30.44	RR
4	Laila El Garaa	Morocco	24.81	x	x	25.45	x	25.57	25.57	
5	Daria Kabiesz	Poland	23.36	x	23.50	24.99	22.76	24.54	24.99	RR
6	Fatiha Mehdi	Algeria	12.25	12.77	13.64	x	13.24	13.26	13.64	

=== F51/52/53 ===
Rank	Athlete	Nationality	Class	1	2	3	4	5	6	Best	Score	Notes
1st place, gold medalist(s)	Josie Pearson	Great Britain	F51	6.38	6.54	6.58	6.04	6.51	6.57	6.58	1122	WR
2nd place, silver medalist(s)	Catherine O'Neill	Ireland	F51	5.66	5.45	5.59	5.62	5.61	5.51	5.66	880	SB
3rd place, bronze medalist(s)	Zena Cole	United States	F51	5.02	5.14	5.25	4.94	4.84	5.16	5.25	771	RR
4	Cassie Mitchell	United States	F52	x	x	12.21	11.01	12.96	x	12.96	751	RR
5	Dhouha Chelhi	Tunisia	F51	4.43	3.81	4.12	4.29	4.28	4.76	4.76	643	
6	Estela Salas	Mexico	F53	11.88	11.70	12.33	11.42	11.59	11.98	12.33	591	
7	Bochra Rzouga	Tunisia	F53	10.44	10.37	10.10	9.28	10.15	9.76	10.44	424	
8	Fatema Nedham	Bahrain	F53	9.83	9.26	9.02	x	x	x	9.83	375	RR

=== F57/58 ===
Rank	Athlete	Nationality	Class	1	2	3	4	5	6	Best	Score	Notes
1st place, gold medalist(s)	Nassima Saifi	Algeria	F58	40.34	x	x	36.44	x	x	40.34	1004	PR
2nd place, silver medalist(s)	Stela Eneva	Bulgaria	F58	34.35	x	36.56	x	36.34	x	36.56	926	SB
3rd place, bronze medalist(s)	Orla Barry	Ireland	F57	28.12	28.01	x	27.71	x	26.21	28.12	921	
4	Nadia Medjmedj	Algeria	F57	26.96	27.56	27.80	x	22.91	x	27.80	911	SB
5	Grace Nwaozuzu	Nigeria	F58	33.77	31.08	22.38	29.94	32.65	32.73	33.77	850	PB
6	Larisa Volik	Russia	F57	x	23.49	25.07	24.83	21.25	x	25.07	808	
7	Siham Alrasheedy	United Arab Emirates	F57	x	24.15	24.23	21.75	24.33	x	24.33	776	
8	Ivanka Koleva	Bulgaria	F57	21.57	23.15	22.78	20.48	11.90	21.30	23.15	720	SB
9	Ilke Wyludda	Germany	F58	29.57	x	28.74	–	–	–	29.57	705	PB
10	Ming Liu	China	F57	22.66	x	x	–	–	–	22.66	695	SB
11	Thi Hai Nguyen	Vietnam	F58	27.39	28.14	x	–	–	–	28.14	647	
12	Catalina Rosales Montiel	Mexico	F58	26.79	x	27.52	–	–	–	27.52	621	SB
13	Eucharia Iyiazi	Nigeria	F58	x	x	26.61	–	–	–	26.61	581	
14	Madinat Abdullayeva	Azerbaijan	F57	17.67	18.04	19.21	–	–	–	19.21	501	SB
15	Mary Nakhumicha Zakayo	Kenya	F57	16.93	15.28	17.53	–	–	–	17.53	399	SB
16	Evelyne Tuitavake	France	F58	x	20.94	x	–	–	–	20.94	319	
17	Dedeline Mibamba Kimbata	Democratic Republic of the Congo	F58	9.29	8.61	8.75	–	–	–	9.29	11	SB
–	Ling Li	China	F57	x	x	x	–	–	–	NM		
