= Athletics at the 2012 Summer Paralympics T/F31–38 =

Athletics at the XIV Paralympic Games
- Paralympic Athletics
- Venue: Olympic Stadium; The Mall
- Dates: 31 August – 9 September 2012
- Competitors: 1100 (740 men, 360 women)

Athletics at the 2012 Summer Paralympics
Classification
T/F11–13: Blind and visually impaired
T/F20: Intellectual disability
T/F31–38: Cerebral palsy
F40: Les Autres
T/F42–46: Amputees
T/F51–58: Spinal cord disability
Men T/F31–38
Track
100 m	T34	T35	T36
T37	T38
200 m	T34	T35	T36
T37	T38
400 m	T36	T38
800 m	T36	T37
1500 m	T37
Field
Long jump	F36	F37-38
Shot put	F32-33	F34
F37-38
Club throw	F31-32/51
Discus throw	F32-34	F35-36
F37-38
Javelin throw	F33-34
Women T/F31–38
Track
100 m	T34	T35	T36
T37	T38
200 m	T34	T35	T36
T37	T38
400 m	T37
4×100 m relay	T35-38
Field
Long jump	F37-38
Shot put	F32-34	F35-36
F37
Club throw	F31-32/51
Discus throw	F35-36	F37
Javelin throw	F33-34/52-53	F37-38

Athletics events at the 2012 Summer Paralympics were held in the Olympic Stadium and in The Mall in London, United Kingdom, from 31 August to 9 September 2012. 42 events were staged for athletes with cerebral palsy, and 3 jointly with athletes with spinal cord damage.

== Classification ==
Athletes were given a classification depending on the type and extent of their disability. The classification system allowed athletes to compete against others with a similar level of function.

The athletics classifications are:

- 11–13: Blind (11) and visually impaired (12, 13) athletes
- 20: Athletes with an intellectual disability
- 31–38: Athletes with cerebral palsy
- 40: Les Autres (others) (including people with dwarfism)
- 42–46: Amputees
- 51–58: Athletes with a spinal cord disability

The class numbers were given prefixes of "T" and "F" for track and field events, respectively.

== Medal summary ==
=== Men's events ===
Event	Classification	Gold	Silver	Bronze
100 m	T34	Walid Ktila; Tunisia	Rheed McCracken; Australia	Mohamed Hammadi; United Arab Emirates
100 m	T35	Iurii Tsaruk; Ukraine	Teboho Mokgalagadi; South Africa	Fu Xinhan; China
100 m	T36	Evgenii Shvetcov; Russia	Graeme Ballard; Great Britain	Roman Pavlyk; Ukraine
100 m	T37	Fanie van der Merwe; South Africa	Liang Yongbin; China	Roman Kapranov; Russia
100 m	T38	Evan O'Hanlon; Australia	Dyan Buis; South Africa	Zhou Wenjun; China
200 m	T34	Walid Ktila; Tunisia	Mohamed Hammadi; United Arab Emirates	Rheed McCracken; Australia
200 m	T35	Iurii Tsaruk; Ukraine	Fu Xinhan; China	Hernan Barreto; Argentina
200 m	T36	Roman Pavlyk; Ukraine	So Wa Wai; Hong Kong	Ben Rushgrove; Great Britain
200 m	T37	Roman Kapranov; Russia	Shang Guangxu; China	Omar Monterola; Venezuela
200 m	T38	Evan O'Hanlon; Australia	Dyan Buis; South Africa	Zhou Wenjun; China
400 m	T36	Evgenii Shvetcov; Russia	Paul Blake; Great Britain	Roman Pavlyk; Ukraine
400 m	T38	Mohamed Farhat Chida; Tunisia	Zhou Wenjun; China	Union Sekailwe; South Africa
800 m	T36	Evgenii Shvetcov; Russia	Artem Arefyev; Russia	Paul Blake; Great Britain
800 m	T37	Michael McKillop; Ireland	Mohamed Charmi; Tunisia	Brad Scott; Australia
1500 m	T37	Michael McKillop; Ireland	Brad Scott; Australia	Mohamed Charmi; Tunisia
Long jump	F36	Roman Pavlyk; Ukraine	Mariusz Sobczak; Poland	Vladimir Sviridov; Russia
Long jump	F37/38	Gocha Khugaev; Russia	Ma Yuxi; China	Dyan Buis; South Africa
Shot put	F32/33	Kamel Kardjena; Algeria	Karim Betina; Algeria	Mounir Bakiri; Algeria
Shot put	F34	Azeddine Nouiri; Morocco	Mohsen Kaedi; Iran	Thierry Cibone; France
Shot put	F37/38	Xia Dong; China	Ibrahim Ahmed Abdelwareth; Egypt	Javad Hardani; Iran
Club throw	F31/32/51	Zeljko Dimitrijevic (*); Serbia	Radim Beles (*); Czech Republic	Lahouari Bahlaz; Algeria
Discus throw	F32/33/34	Wang Yanzhang; China	Hani Alnakhli; Saudi Arabia	Lahouari Bahlaz; Algeria
Discus throw	F35/36	Sebastian Dietz; Germany	Oleksii Pashkov; Ukraine	Wang Wenbo; China
Discus throw	F37/38	Javad Hardani; Iran	Xia Dong; China	Tomasz Blatkiewicz; Poland
Javelin throw	F33/34	Mohsen Kaedi; Iran	Wang Yanzhang (athlete); China	Kamel Kardjena; Algeria

(*) F51 competitor

=== Women's events ===
Event	Classification	Gold	Silver	Bronze
100 m	T34	Hannah Cockroft; Great Britain	Amy Siemons; Netherlands	Rosemary Little; Australia
100 m	T35	Liu Ping; China	Oxana Corso; Italy	Virginia McLachlan; Canada
100 m	T36	Elena Ivanova; Russia	Jeon Min-Jae; South Korea	Claudia Nicoleitzik; Germany
100 m	T37	Mandy François-Elie; France	Johanna Benson; Namibia	Neda Bahi; Tunisia
100 m	T38	Margarita Goncharova; Russia	Chen Junfei; China	Inna Stryzhak; Ukraine
200 m	T34	Hannah Cockroft; Great Britain	Amy Siemons; Netherlands	Desiree Vranken; Netherlands
200 m	T35	Liu Ping; China	Oxana Corso; Italy	Virginia McLachlan; Canada
200 m	T36	Elena Ivanova; Russia	Jeon Min-Jae; South Korea	Claudia Nicoleitzik; Germany
200 m	T37	Johanna Benson; Namibia	Bethany Woodward; Great Britain	Maria Seifert; Germany
200 m	T38	Chen Junfei; China	Margarita Goncharova; Russia	Inna Stryzhak; Ukraine
400 m	T37	Neda Bahi; Tunisia	Viktoriya Kravchenko; Ukraine	Evgeniya Trushnikova; Russia
4 × 100 m relay	T35/T38	Russia (RUS); Anastasiya Ovsyannikova; Svetlana Sergeeva; Elena Ivanova; Margarita Goncharova	China (CHN); Xiong Dezhi; Cao Yuanhang; Liu Ping; Chen Junfei	Great Britain (GBR); Olivia Breen; Bethany Woodward; Katrina Hart; Jenny McLoughlin
Long jump	F37/38	Margarita Goncharova; Russia	Inna Stryzhak; Ukraine	Cao Yuanhang; China
Shot put	F32/34	Birgit Kober; Germany	Louise Ellery; Australia	Maroua Ibrahmi; Tunisia
Shot put	F35/36	Mariia Pomazan; Ukraine	Wang Jun; China	Wu Qing; China
Shot put	F37	Mi Na; China	Xu Qiuping; China	Eva Berna; Czech Republic
Club throw	F31/32/51	Maroua Ibrahmi; Tunisia	Mounia Gasmi; Algeria	Gemma Prescott; Great Britain
Discus throw	F35/36	Wu Qing; China	Mariia Pomazan; Ukraine	Kath Proudfoot; Australia
Discus throw	F37	Mi Na; China	Xu Qiuping; China	Beverley Jones; Great Britain
Javelin throw	F33/34/52/53	Birgit Kober; Germany	Marie Brämer-Skowronek; Germany	Marjaana Huovinen; Finland
Javelin throw	F37/38	Shirlene Coelho; Brazil	Jia Qianqian; China	Georgia Beikoff; Australia

== See also ==
- Athletics at the 2012 Summer Olympics
