= Athletics at the 2012 Summer Paralympics – Women's 100 metres T34 =

Women's 100 metres T34 at the XIV Paralympic Games
- Venue: London Olympic Stadium
- Dates: 31 August
- Competitors: 11 from 7 nations

Medalists
| 1st place, gold medalist(s) | | Hannah Cockroft | Great Britain |
| 2nd place, silver medalist(s) | | Amy Siemons | Netherlands |
| 3rd place, bronze medalist(s) | | Rosemary Little | Australia |

Athletics at the 2012 Summer Paralympics
Classification
T/F11–13: Blind and visually impaired
T/F20: Intellectual disability
T/F31–38: Cerebral palsy
F40: Les Autres
T/F42–46: Amputees
T/F51–58: Spinal cord disability
Men T/F31–38
Track
100 m | T34 | T35 | T36
T37 | T38
200 m | T34 | T35 | T36
T37 | T38
400 m | T36 | T38
800 m | T36 | T37
1500 m | T37
Field
Long jump | F36 | F37-38
Shot put | F32-33 | F34
F37-38
Club throw | F31-32/51
Discus throw | F32-34 | F35-36
F37-38
Javelin throw | F33-34
Women T/F31–38
Track
100 m | T34 | T35 | T36
T37 | T38
200 m | T34 | T35 | T36
T37 | T38
400 m | T37
4×100 m relay | T35-38
Field
Long jump | F37-38
Shot put | F32-34 | F35-36
F37
Club throw | F31-32/51
Discus throw | F35-36 | F37
Javelin throw | F33-34/52-53 | F37-38

The Women's 100 metres T34 event at the 2012 Summer Paralympics took place at the London Olympic Stadium on 31 August.

The T34 category is for wheelchair athletes with cerebral palsy. Athletes in this category have minimal limitations or control problems in their arms and trunk while pushing a wheelchair.

Broken records during the 2012 Summer Paralympics
| Paralympic record | Hannah Cockroft (GBR) | 18.24 | London, United Kingdom | 31 August 2012 |
| Paralympic record | Hannah Cockroft (GBR) | 18.06 | London, United Kingdom | 31 August 2012 |

== Results ==
=== Round 1 ===
Competed 31 August 2012 from 12:30. Qual. rule: first 3 in each heat (Q) plus the 2 fastest other times (q) qualified.

==== Heat 1 ====
| Rank | Athlete | Country | Class | Time | Notes |
|---|---|---|---|---|---|
| 1 | Amy Siemons | Netherlands | T34 | 19.94 | Q |
| 2 | Rachael Burrows | Canada | T34 | 22.02 | Q |
| 3 | Kristen Messer | United States | T33 | 22.10 | Q, PRC |
| 4 | Haruka Kitaura | Japan | T34 | 22.35 | |
| 5 | Melissa Nicholls | Great Britain | T34 | 22.41 | |
| 6 | Kristy Pond | Australia | T34 | 24.58 | |
| | | | | Wind: -0.8 m/s | |

==== Heat 2 ====
| Rank | Athlete | Country | Class | Time | Notes |
|---|---|---|---|---|---|
| 1 | Hannah Cockroft | Great Britain | T34 | 18.24 | Q, PR |
| 2 | Yousra Ben Jemaa | Tunisia | T34 | 20.57 | Q, RR |
| 3 | Rosemary Little | Australia | T34 | 20.65 | Q, RR |
| 4 | Desiree Vranken | Netherlands | T34 | 20.69 | q |
| 5 | Carleigh Dewald | United States | T34 | 21.77 | q |
| | | | | Wind: +0.1 m/s | |

=== Final ===
Competed 31 August 2012 at 20:00.

| Rank | Athlete | Country | Class | Time | Notes |
|---|---|---|---|---|---|
| 1st place, gold medalist(s) | Hannah Cockroft | Great Britain | T34 | 18.06 | PR |
| 2nd place, silver medalist(s) | Amy Siemons | Netherlands | T34 | 19.49 | |
| 3rd place, bronze medalist(s) | Rosemary Little | Australia | T34 | 19.95 | RR |
| 4 | Desiree Vranken | Netherlands | T34 | 20.37 | |
| 5 | Yousra Ben Jemaa | Tunisia | T34 | 20.52 | RR |
| 6 | Kristen Messer | United States | T33 | 21.59 | WRC |
| 7 | Carleigh Dewald | United States | T34 | 21.83 | |
| 8 | Rachael Burrows | Canada | T34 | 22.59 | |
| | | | | Wind: -0.4 m/s | |

Q = qualified by place. q = qualified by time. WRC = World Record for athlete's classification. PR = Paralympic Record. PRC = Paralympic Record for athlete's classification. RR = Regional Record.
