= Athletics at the 2012 Summer Paralympics – Women's 200 metres T34 =

Women's 200 metres T34 at the XIV Paralympic Games
- Venue: London Olympic Stadium
- Dates: 6 September
- Competitors: 11 from 7 nations
- Winning time: 31.90

Medalists
| 1st place, gold medalist(s) | | Hannah Cockroft | Great Britain |
| 2nd place, silver medalist(s) | | Amy Siemons | Netherlands |
| 3rd place, bronze medalist(s) | | Desiree Vranken | Netherlands |

Athletics at the 2012 Summer Paralympics
Classification
T/F11–13: Blind and visually impaired
T/F20: Intellectual disability
T/F31–38: Cerebral palsy
F40: Les Autres
T/F42–46: Amputees
T/F51–58: Spinal cord disability
Men T/F31–38
Track
100 m | T34 | T35 | T36
T37 | T38
200 m | T34 | T35 | T36
T37 | T38
400 m | T36 | T38
800 m | T36 | T37
1500 m | T37
Field
Long jump | F36 | F37-38
Shot put | F32-33 | F34
F37-38
Club throw | F31-32/51
Discus throw | F32-34 | F35-36
F37-38
Javelin throw | F33-34
Women T/F31–38
Track
100 m | T34 | T35 | T36
T37 | T38
200 m | T34 | T35 | T36
T37 | T38
400 m | T37
4×100 m relay | T35-38
Field
Long jump | F37-38
Shot put | F32-34 | F35-36
F37
Club throw | F31-32/51
Discus throw | F35-36 | F37
Javelin throw | F33-34/52-53 | F37-38

The Women's 200 metres T34 event at the 2012 Summer Paralympics took place at the London Olympic Stadium on 6 September. The event consisted of 2 heats and a final.

The T34 category is for wheelchair athletes with cerebral palsy. Athletes in this category have minimal limitations or control problems in their arms and trunk while pushing a wheelchair.

== Records ==
Prior to the competition, the existing World and Paralympic records were as follows:

| World & Paralympic record (T33) | Mary Rice (IRL) | 38.38 | 25 October 2000 | Sydney, Australia |
| World & Paralympic record (T34) | Deborah Brennan (GBR) | 33.87 | 25 October 2000 | Sydney, Australia |
Broken records during the 2012 Summer Paralympics
| Paralympic record (T34) | Hannah Cockroft (GBR) | 33.20 | 6 September 2012 | |
| Paralympic record (T34) | Hannah Cockroft (GBR) | 31.90 | 6 September 2012 | |

== Results ==
=== Round 1 ===
Competed 6 September 2012 from 11:41. Qual. rule: first 3 in each heat (Q) plus the 2 fastest other times (q) qualified.

==== Heat 1 ====
| Rank | Athlete | Country | Class | Time | Notes |
|---|---|---|---|---|---|
| 1 | Rosemary Little | Australia | T34 | 34.69 | Q, RR |
| 2 | Amy Siemons | Netherlands | T34 | 34.88 | Q |
| 3 | Yousra Ben Jemaa | Tunisia | T34 | 36.81 | Q, RR |
| 4 | Melissa Nicholls | Great Britain | T34 | 39.41 | q |
| 5 | Carleigh Dewald | United States | T34 | 40.36 | q |
| 6 | Haruka Kitaura | Japan | T34 | 41.89 | |
| | | | | Wind: +0.9 m/s | |

==== Heat 2 ====
| Rank | Athlete | Country | Class | Time | Notes |
|---|---|---|---|---|---|
| 1 | Hannah Cockroft | Great Britain | T34 | 33.20 | Q, PR |
| 2 | Desiree Vranken | Netherlands | T34 | 35.56 | Q, PB |
| 3 | Rachael Burrows | Canada | T34 | 39.59 | Q |
| 4 | Kristen Messer | United States | T33 | 40.45 | |
| 5 | Kristy Pond | Australia | T34 | 43.92 | |
| | | | | Wind: -0.1 m/s | |

=== Final ===
Competed 6 September 2012 at 19:44.

| Rank | Athlete | Country | Class | Time | Notes |
|---|---|---|---|---|---|
| 1st place, gold medalist(s) | Hannah Cockroft | Great Britain | T34 | 31.90 | PR |
| 2nd place, silver medalist(s) | Amy Siemons | Netherlands | T34 | 34.16 | |
| 3rd place, bronze medalist(s) | Desiree Vranken | Netherlands | T34 | 34.85 | PB |
| 4 | Rosemary Little | Australia | T34 | 35.08 | |
| 5 | Yousra Ben Jemaa | Tunisia | T34 | 37.68 | |
| 6 | Rachael Burrows | Canada | T34 | 38.51 | |
| 7 | Melissa Nicholls | Great Britain | T34 | 40.00 | |
| 8 | Carleigh Dewald | United States | T34 | 41.53 | |
| | | | | Wind: +0.7 m/s | |

Q = qualified by place. q = qualified by time. PR = Paralympic Record. RR = Regional Record. PB = Personal Best. SB = Seasonal Best.
