= Athletics at the 2012 Summer Paralympics – Men's 200 metres T37 =

Men's 200 metres T37 at the XIV Paralympic Games
- Venue: London Olympic Stadium
- Dates: 31 August
- Competitors: 11 from 9 nations
- Winning time: 23.10

Medalists
1st place, gold medalist(s)		Roman Kapranov	Russia
2nd place, silver medalist(s)		Shang Guangxu	China
3rd place, bronze medalist(s)		Omar Monterola	Venezuela

Athletics at the 2012 Summer Paralympics
Classification
T/F11–13: Blind and visually impaired
T/F20: Intellectual disability
T/F31–38: Cerebral palsy
F40: Les Autres
T/F42–46: Amputees
T/F51–58: Spinal cord disability
Men T/F31–38
Track
100 m	T34	T35	T36
T37	T38
200 m	T34	T35	T36
T37	T38
400 m	T36	T38
800 m	T36	T37
1500 m	T37
Field
Long jump	F36	F37-38
Shot put	F32-33	F34
F37-38
Club throw	F31-32/51
Discus throw	F32-34	F35-36
F37-38
Javelin throw	F33-34
Women T/F31–38
Track
100 m	T34	T35	T36
T37	T38
200 m	T34	T35	T36
T37	T38
400 m	T37
4×100 m relay	T35-38
Field
Long jump	F37-38
Shot put	F32-34	F35-36
F37
Club throw	F31-32/51
Discus throw	F35-36	F37
Javelin throw	F33-34/52-53	F37-38

The Men's 200 metres T37 event at the 2012 Summer Paralympics took place at the London Olympic Stadium on 31 August.

The T37 category is for ambulant athletes with cerebral palsy. These athletes have movement and coordination problems on one half of their body. They have good ability in their dominant side of their body (ie hemiplegia).

== Records ==
Prior to the competition, the existing World and Paralympic records were as follows:

World record	Fanie van der Merwe (RSA)	23.10	15 September 2011	Maputo, Mozambique
Paralympic record	Fanie van der Merwe (RSA)	23.84	16 September 2008	Beijing, China
Broken records during the 2012 Summer Paralympics
Paralympic record	Roman Kapranov (RUS)	23.24	31 August 2012	

== Results ==
=== Round 1 ===
Competed 31 August 2012 from 11:33. Qual. rule: first 3 in each heat (Q) plus the 2 fastest other times (q) qualified.

==== Heat 1 ====
Rank	Athlete	Country	Time	Notes
1	Roman Kapranov	Russia	23.24	Q, PR
2	Shang Guangxu	China	23.33	Q, RR
3	Omar Monterola	Venezuela	23.64	Q, RR
4	Sofiane Hamdi	Algeria	24.39	q
5	Rhys Jones	Great Britain	24.39	q, PB
6	Marcel Houssimoli	Vanuatu	30.12	
			Wind: +0.8 m/s	

==== Heat 2 ====
Rank	Athlete	Country	Time	Notes
1	Liang Yongbin	China	23.78	Q, PB
2	Fanie van der Merwe	South Africa	23.83	Q
3	Gocha Khugaev	Russia	24.20	Q
4	Mostafa Fathalla Mohamed	Egypt	24.58	
5	Lucas Ferrari	Brazil	25.51	PB
			Wind: -0.8 m/s	

=== Final ===
Competed 31 August 2012 at 20:08.

Rank	Athlete	Country	Time	Notes
1st place, gold medalist(s)	Roman Kapranov	Russia	23.10	=WR
2nd place, silver medalist(s)	Shang Guangxu	China	23.15	RR
3rd place, bronze medalist(s)	Omar Monterola	Venezuela	23.34	RR
4	Liang Yongbin	China	23.40	PB
5	Sofiane Hamdi	Algeria	23.67	
6	Fanie van der Merwe	South Africa	23.79	
7	Gocha Khugaev	Russia	24.13	
8	Rhys Jones	Great Britain	24.68	
			Wind: +0.2 m/s	

Q = qualified by place. q = qualified by time. PR = Paralympic Record. RR = Regional Record. PB = Personal Best.
