= Athletics at the 2012 Summer Paralympics – Men's 100 metres T34 =

Men's 100 metres T34 at the XIV Paralympic Games
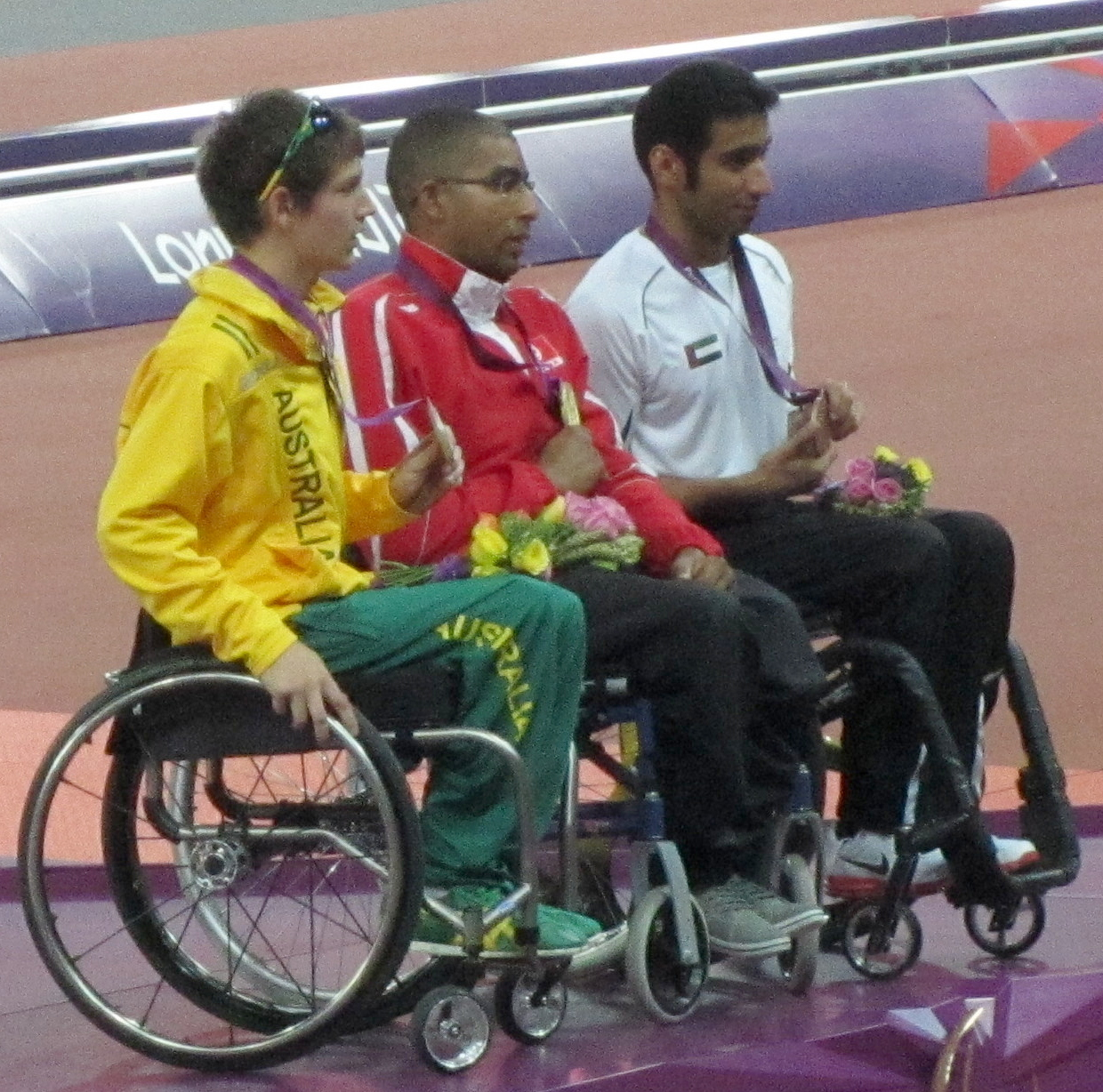
- Left-right: McCracken, Ktila, Hammadi
- Venue: London Olympic Stadium
- Dates: 8 September
- Competitors: 12 from 11 nations

Medalists
1st place, gold medalist(s)		Walid Ktila	Tunisia
2nd place, silver medalist(s)		Rheed McCracken	Australia
3rd place, bronze medalist(s)		Mohamed Hammadi	United Arab Emirates

Athletics at the 2012 Summer Paralympics
Classification
T/F11–13: Blind and visually impaired
T/F20: Intellectual disability
T/F31–38: Cerebral palsy
F40: Les Autres
T/F42–46: Amputees
T/F51–58: Spinal cord disability
Men T/F31–38
Track
100 m	T34	T35	T36
T37	T38
200 m	T34	T35	T36
T37	T38
400 m	T36	T38
800 m	T36	T37
1500 m	T37
Field
Long jump	F36	F37-38
Shot put	F32-33	F34
F37-38
Club throw	F31-32/51
Discus throw	F32-34	F35-36
F37-38
Javelin throw	F33-34
Women T/F31–38
Track
100 m	T34	T35	T36
T37	T38
200 m	T34	T35	T36
T37	T38
400 m	T37
4×100 m relay	T35-38
Field
Long jump	F37-38
Shot put	F32-34	F35-36
F37
Club throw	F31-32/51
Discus throw	F35-36	F37
Javelin throw	F33-34/52-53	F37-38

The Men's 100 metres T34 event for the 2012 Summer Paralympics took place at the London Olympic Stadium on 8 September.

The T34 category is for wheelchair athletes with cerebral palsy. Athletes in this category have minimal limitations or control problems in their arms and trunk while pushing a wheelchair.

== Records ==
Prior to the competition, the existing World and Paralympic records were as follows.

World record	Walid Ktila (TUN)	15.69	Kuwait City, Kuwait	17 January 2012
Paralympic record	Not previously competed			
Broken records during the 2012 Summer Paralympics
Paralympic record	Walid Ktila (TUN)	15.95	London, United Kingdom	8 September 2012
Paralympic record	Walid Ktila (TUN)	15.91	London, United Kingdom	8 September 2012

Ahmad Almutairi of Kuwait, classified T33, competed in this event as there was no T33 competition. Although he set a World Record (for his classification) of 17.67s in the heats, he failed to reach the final.

== Results ==
=== Round 1 ===
Competed 8 September 2012 from 11:10. Qual. rule: First 3 in each heat (Q) plus the 2 fastest other times (q) qualified.

==== Heat 1 ====
Rank	Athlete	Country	Time	Notes
1	Walid Ktila	Tunisia	15.95	Q, PR
2	Mohamed Hammadi	United Arab Emirates	16.42	Q, RR
3	Stefan Rusch	Netherlands	16.79	Q
4	Sebastien Mobre	France	16.88	q
5	Ahmad Almutairi	Kuwait	17.67	WRC
6	Jamie Carter	Great Britain	17.75	
			Wind: +0.4 m/s	

==== Heat 2 ====
Rank	Athlete	Country	Time	Notes
1	Bojan Mitic	Switzerland	16.56	Q
2	Rheed McCracken	Australia	16.84	Q, RR
3	Henk Schuiling	Netherlands	17.18	Q, PB
4	Nathan Dewitt	Canada	17.35	q
5	Atsuro Kobata	Japan	17.65	PB
6	Austin Pruitt	United States	17.86	
			Wind: +0.9 m/s	

=== Final ===
Competed 8 September 2012 at 19:56.

Rank	Athlete	Country	Time	Notes
1st place, gold medalist(s)	Walid Ktila	Tunisia	15.91	PR
2nd place, silver medalist(s)	Rheed McCracken	Australia	16.30	RR
3rd place, bronze medalist(s)	Mohamed Hammadi	United Arab Emirates	16.41	RR
4	Bojan Mitic	Switzerland	16.69	
5	Sebastien Mobre	France	16.73	
6	Stefan Rusch	Netherlands	16.74	PB
7	Henk Schuiling	Netherlands	17.32	
8	Nathan Dewitt	Canada	17.36	
			Wind: +0.1 m/s	

Q = qualified by place. q = qualified by time. WRC = World Record for athlete's classification. PR = Paralympic Record. RR = Regional Record. PB = Personal Best.
