= Athletics at the 2012 Summer Paralympics – Women's 100 metres T38 =

Women's 100 metres T38 at the XIV Paralympic Games
- Venue: London Olympic Stadium
- Dates: 1 September
- Competitors: 11 from 9 nations

Medalists
1st place, gold medalist(s)		Margarita Goncharova	Russia
2nd place, silver medalist(s)		Chen Junfei	China
3rd place, bronze medalist(s)		Inna Stryzhak	Ukraine

Athletics at the 2012 Summer Paralympics
Classification
T/F11–13: Blind and visually impaired
T/F20: Intellectual disability
T/F31–38: Cerebral palsy
F40: Les Autres
T/F42–46: Amputees
T/F51–58: Spinal cord disability
Men T/F31–38
Track
100 m	T34	T35	T36
T37	T38
200 m	T34	T35	T36
T37	T38
400 m	T36	T38
800 m	T36	T37
1500 m	T37
Field
Long jump	F36	F37-38
Shot put	F32-33	F34
F37-38
Club throw	F31-32/51
Discus throw	F32-34	F35-36
F37-38
Javelin throw	F33-34
Women T/F31–38
Track
100 m	T34	T35	T36
T37	T38
200 m	T34	T35	T36
T37	T38
400 m	T37
4×100 m relay	T35-38
Field
Long jump	F37-38
Shot put	F32-34	F35-36
F37
Club throw	F31-32/51
Discus throw	F35-36	F37
Javelin throw	F33-34/52-53	F37-38

The Women's 100 metres T38 event at the 2012 Summer Paralympics took place at the London Olympic Stadium on 1 September.

The T38 category is for ambulant athletes with cerebral palsy. T38 athletes have the mildest form of impairment caused by cerebral palsy, often in only one limb, and not affecting the ability to run, walk or jump freely, although impairing performance. T38 athletes may suffer minor co-ordination difficulties.

== Results ==
=== Round 1 ===
Competed 1 September 2012 from 12:04. Qual. rule: first 3 in each heat (Q) plus the 2 fastest other times (q) qualified.

==== Heat 1 ====
Rank	Athlete	Country	Time	Notes
1	Chen Junfei	China	14.00	Q, RR
2	Margarita Goncharova	Russia	14.03	Q
3	Sonia Mansour	Tunisia	14.40	Q, SB
4	Torita Isaac	Australia	14.67	q
5	Norsyazwani Binti Abdullah	Malaysia	15.34	
			Wind: +0.7 m/s	

==== Heat 2 ====
Rank	Athlete	Country	Time	Notes
1	Inna Stryzhak	Ukraine	13.68	Q, SB
2	Xiong Dezhi	China	14.07	Q, PB
3	Olivia Breen	Great Britain	14.21	Q
4	Jenifer Santos	Brazil	14.66	q, SB
5	Katy Parrish	Australia	14.75	
6	Tamira Slaby	Germany	DQ	
			Wind: +0.8 m/s	

=== Final ===
Competed 1 September 2012 at 21:18.

Rank	Athlete	Country	Time	Notes
1st place, gold medalist(s)	Margarita Goncharova	Russia	13.45	PB
2nd place, silver medalist(s)	Chen Junfei	China	13.53	RR
3rd place, bronze medalist(s)	Inna Stryzhak	Ukraine	13.64	SB
4	Xiong Dezhi	China	14.32	
5	Olivia Breen	Great Britain	14.42	
6	Sonia Mansour	Tunisia	14.45	
7	Torita Isaac	Australia	14.50	PB
8	Jenifer Santos	Brazil	14.87	
			Wind: -0.9 m/s	

Q = qualified by place. q = qualified by time. RR = Regional Record. PB = Personal Best. SB = Seasonal Best. DQ = Disqualified.
