= Athletics at the 2012 Summer Paralympics – Men's 200 metres T34 =

Men's 200 metres T34 at the XIV Paralympic Games
- Venue: London Olympic Stadium
- Dates: 4 September
- Competitors: 12 from 11 nations
- Winning time: 27.98

Medalists
1st place, gold medalist(s)		Walid Ktila	Tunisia
2nd place, silver medalist(s)		Mohamed Hammadi	United Arab Emirates
3rd place, bronze medalist(s)		Rheed McCracken	Australia

Athletics at the 2012 Summer Paralympics
Classification
T/F11–13: Blind and visually impaired
T/F20: Intellectual disability
T/F31–38: Cerebral palsy
F40: Les Autres
T/F42–46: Amputees
T/F51–58: Spinal cord disability
Men T/F31–38
Track
100 m	T34	T35	T36
T37	T38
200 m	T34	T35	T36
T37	T38
400 m	T36	T38
800 m	T36	T37
1500 m	T37
Field
Long jump	F36	F37-38
Shot put	F32-33	F34
F37-38
Club throw	F31-32/51
Discus throw	F32-34	F35-36
F37-38
Javelin throw	F33-34
Women T/F31–38
Track
100 m	T34	T35	T36
T37	T38
200 m	T34	T35	T36
T37	T38
400 m	T37
4×100 m relay	T35-38
Field
Long jump	F37-38
Shot put	F32-34	F35-36
F37
Club throw	F31-32/51
Discus throw	F35-36	F37
Javelin throw	F33-34/52-53	F37-38

The Men's 200 metres T34 event at the 2012 Summer Paralympics took place at the London Olympic Stadium on 4 September.

The T34 category is for wheelchair athletes with cerebral palsy. Athletes in this category have minimal limitations or control problems in their arms and trunk while pushing a wheelchair.

== Records ==
Prior to the competition, the existing World and Paralympic records were as follows:

World record	Jason Lachance (CAN)	28.82	12 August 2000	Gothenburg, Sweden
Paralympic record	Jason Lachance (CAN)	29.17	16 October 2000	Sydney, Australia
Broken records during the 2012 Summer Paralympics
Paralympic record	Mohamed Hammadi (UAE)	29.03	4 September 2012	
World record	Walid Ktila (TUN)	27.98	4 September 2012	
World record	Walid Ktila (TUN)	27.98	4 September 2012	

== Results ==
=== Round 1 ===
Competed 4 September 2012 from 10:55. Qual. rule: first 3 in each heat (Q) plus the 2 fastest other times (q) qualified.

==== Heat 1 ====
Rank	Athlete	Country	Class	Time	Notes
1	Mohamed Hammadi	United Arab Emirates	T34	29.03	Q, PR
2	Bojan Mitic	Switzerland	T34	30.23	Q
3	Austin Pruitt	United States	T34	30.38	Q
4	Stefan Rusch	Netherlands	T34	30.57	q, PB
5	Jamie Carter	Great Britain	T34	30.85	q, PB
6	Atsuro Kobata	Japan	T34	32.08	PB
				Wind: +0.8 m/s	

==== Heat 2 ====
Rank	Athlete	Country	Class	Time	Notes
1	Walid Ktila	Tunisia	T34	27.98	Q, WR
2	Rheed McCracken	Australia	T34	28.89	Q, RR
3	Sebastien Mobre	France	T34	29.42	Q, =PB
4	Ahmad Almutairi	Kuwait	T33	31.02	WRC
5	Henk Schuiling	Netherlands	T34	31.10	PB
6	Nathan Dewitt	Canada	T34	31.30	
				Wind: -0.3 m/s	

=== Final ===
Competed 4 September 2012 at 19:53.

Rank	Athlete	Country	Class	Time	Notes
1st place, gold medalist(s)	Walid Ktila	Tunisia	T34	27.98	WR
2nd place, silver medalist(s)	Mohamed Hammadi	United Arab Emirates	T34	28.95	SB
3rd place, bronze medalist(s)	Rheed McCracken	Australia	T34	29.08	
4	Bojan Mitic	Switzerland	T34	30.35	
5	Austin Pruitt	United States	T34	30.55	
6	Stefan Rusch	Netherlands	T34	30.63	
7	Sebastien Mobre	France	T34	30.67	
8	Jamie Carter	Great Britain	T34	30.94	
				Wind: -0.4 m/s	

Q = qualified by place. q = qualified by time. WR = World Record. WRC = World Record for athlete's classification. PR = Paralympic Record. RR = Regional Record. PB = Personal Best. SB = Seasonal Best.
