= Athletics at the 2012 Summer Paralympics – Men's 100 metres T37 =

Men's 100 metres T37 at the XIV Paralympic Games
- Venue: London Olympic Stadium
- Dates: 8 September
- Competitors: 17 from 11 nations

Medalists
1st place, gold medalist(s)		Fanie van der Merwe	South Africa
2nd place, silver medalist(s)		Liang Yongbin	China
3rd place, bronze medalist(s)		Roman Kapranov	Russia

Athletics at the 2012 Summer Paralympics
Classification
T/F11–13: Blind and visually impaired
T/F20: Intellectual disability
T/F31–38: Cerebral palsy
F40: Les Autres
T/F42–46: Amputees
T/F51–58: Spinal cord disability
Men T/F31–38
Track
100 m	T34	T35	T36
T37	T38
200 m	T34	T35	T36
T37	T38
400 m	T36	T38
800 m	T36	T37
1500 m	T37
Field
Long jump	F36	F37-38
Shot put	F32-33	F34
F37-38
Club throw	F31-32/51
Discus throw	F32-34	F35-36
F37-38
Javelin throw	F33-34
Women T/F31–38
Track
100 m	T34	T35	T36
T37	T38
200 m	T34	T35	T36
T37	T38
400 m	T37
4×100 m relay	T35-38
Field
Long jump	F37-38
Shot put	F32-34	F35-36
F37
Club throw	F31-32/51
Discus throw	F35-36	F37
Javelin throw	F33-34/52-53	F37-38

The Men's 100 metres T37 event at the 2012 Summer Paralympics took place at the London Olympic Stadium on 8 September.

The T37 category is for ambulant athletes with cerebral palsy. These athletes have movement and coordination problems on one half of their body. They have good ability in their dominant side of their body (ie hemiplegia).

== Records ==
Prior to the competition, the existing World and Paralympic records were as follows.

World record	Fanie van der Merwe (RSA)	11.52	Germiston, South Africa	5 February 2012
Paralympic record	Fanie van der Merwe (RSA)	11.83	Beijing, China	12 September 2008
Broken records during the 2012 Summer Paralympics
World record	Fanie van der Merwe (RSA)	11.51	London, United Kingdom	8 September 2012
World record	Liang Yongbin (CHN)	11.51	London, United Kingdom	8 September 2012

== Results ==
=== Round 1 ===
Competed 8 September 2012 from 19:16. Qual. rule: First 3 in each heat (Q) plus the 2 fastest other times (q) qualified.

==== Heat 1 ====
Rank	Athlete	Country	Time	Notes
1	Fanie van der Merwe	South Africa	11.52	Q, =WR
2	Mostafa Fathalla Mohamed	Egypt	11.55	Q, PB
3	Roman Kapranov	Russia	11.61	Q, RR
4	Shang Guangxu	China	11.63	q, RR
5	Rhys Jones	Great Britain	12.19	PB
6	Jelmar Bos	Netherlands	12.23	
7	Benjamin Ivan Cardozo Sanchez	Mexico	12.63	SB
8	Vladislav Barinov	Russia	12.85	SB
9	Marcel Houssimoli	Vanuatu	14.55	SB
			Wind: -1.3 m/s	

==== Heat 2 ====
Rank	Athlete	Country	Time	Notes
1	Liang Yongbin	China	11.63	Q, =RR
2	Omar Monterola	Venezuela	11.68	Q, RR
3	Gocha Khugaev	Russia	11.91	Q, PB
4	Sofiane Hamdi	Algeria	12.01	q
5	Charl du Toit	South Africa	12.11	
6	Ma Yuxi	China	12.14	SB
7	Andrea Dalle Ave	South Africa	12.18	PB
7	Lucas Ferrari	Brazil	12.18	PB
			Wind: -1.0 m/s	

=== Final ===
Competed 8 September 2012 at 10:00.

Rank	Athlete	Country	Time	Notes
1st place, gold medalist(s)	Fanie van der Merwe	South Africa	11.51	WR
2nd place, silver medalist(s)	Liang Yongbin	China	11.51	WR
3rd place, bronze medalist(s)	Roman Kapranov	Russia	11.56	RR
4	Shang Guangxu	China	11.63	=PB
5	Mostafa Fathalla Mohamed	Egypt	11.67	
6	Sofiane Hamdi	Algeria	11.80	
7	Gocha Khugaev	Russia	11.89	PB
8	Omar Monterola	Venezuela	DQ	
			Wind: +0.4 m/s	

Q = qualified by place. q = qualified by time. WR = World Record. RR = Regional Record. PB = Personal Best. DQ = Disqualified.
