= Athletics at the 2012 Summer Paralympics – Women's 200 metres T37 =

Women's 200 metres T37 at the XIV Paralympic Games
- Venue: London Olympic Stadium
- Dates: 2 September
- Competitors: 15 from 8 nations
- Winning time: 29.26

Medalists
1st place, gold medalist(s)		Johanna Benson	Namibia
2nd place, silver medalist(s)		Bethany Woodward	Great Britain
3rd place, bronze medalist(s)		Maria Seifert	Germany

Athletics at the 2012 Summer Paralympics
Classification
T/F11–13: Blind and visually impaired
T/F20: Intellectual disability
T/F31–38: Cerebral palsy
F40: Les Autres
T/F42–46: Amputees
T/F51–58: Spinal cord disability
Men T/F31–38
Track
100 m	T34	T35	T36
T37	T38
200 m	T34	T35	T36
T37	T38
400 m	T36	T38
800 m	T36	T37
1500 m	T37
Field
Long jump	F36	F37-38
Shot put	F32-33	F34
F37-38
Club throw	F31-32/51
Discus throw	F32-34	F35-36
F37-38
Javelin throw	F33-34
Women T/F31–38
Track
100 m	T34	T35	T36
T37	T38
200 m	T34	T35	T36
T37	T38
400 m	T37
4×100 m relay	T35-38
Field
Long jump	F37-38
Shot put	F32-34	F35-36
F37
Club throw	F31-32/51
Discus throw	F35-36	F37
Javelin throw	F33-34/52-53	F37-38

The Women's 200 metres T37 event at the 2012 Summer Paralympics took place at the London Olympic Stadium on 2 September. The event consisted of 2 heats and a final.

The T37 category is for ambulant athletes with cerebral palsy. These athletes have movement and coordination problems on one half of their body. They have good ability in their dominant side of their body (ie hemiplegia).

== Records ==
Prior to the competition, the existing World and Paralympic records were as follows:

World & Paralympic record	Lisa McIntosh (AUS)	28.42	27 October 2000	Sydney, Australia

== Results ==
=== Round 1 ===
Competed 2 September 2012 from 11:05. Qual. rule: first 3 in each heat (Q) plus the 2 fastest other times (q) qualified.

==== Heat 1 ====
Rank	Athlete	Country	Time	Notes
1	Maria Seifert	Germany	29.87	Q
2	Oksana Krechunyak	Ukraine	30.02	Q
3	Viktoriya Kravchenko	Ukraine	30.33	Q
4	Anastasiya Ovsyannikova	Russia	30.99	
5	Katrina Hart	Great Britain	31.04	
6	Matthildur Þorsteinsdóttir	Iceland	32.16	
7	Heather Jameson	Ireland	32.76	
8	Evgeniya Trushnikova	Russia	dq	
			Wind:	

==== Heat 2 ====
Rank	Athlete	Country	Time	Notes
1	Johanna Benson	Namibia	29.39	Q
2	Bethany Woodward	Great Britain	29.50	Q
3	Jenny McLoughlin	Great Britain	29.73	Q
4	Neda Bahi	Tunisia	30.00	q
5	Maryna Snisar	Ukraine	30.56	q
6	Svetlana Sergeeva	Russia	30.84	
7	Isabelle Foerder	Germany	30.91	
			Wind:	

=== Final ===
Competed 2 September 2012 at 20:17.

Rank	Athlete	Country	Time	Notes
1st place, gold medalist(s)	Johanna Benson	Namibia	29.26	
2nd place, silver medalist(s)	Bethany Woodward	Great Britain	29.65	
3rd place, bronze medalist(s)	Maria Seifert	Germany	29.86	
4	Oksana Krechunyak	Ukraine	29.89	
5	Jenny McLoughlin	Great Britain	30.08	
6	Viktoriya Kravchenko	Ukraine	30.09	
7	Neda Bahi	Tunisia	30.28	
8	Maryna Snisar	Ukraine	30.76	
			Wind:	

Q = qualified by place. q = qualified by time. RR = Regional Record. PB = Personal Best. SB = Seasonal Best.
