= Athletics at the 2012 Summer Paralympics – Men's 200 metres T38 =

Men's 200 metres T38 at the XIV Paralympic Games
- Venue: London Olympic Stadium
- Dates: 7 and 8 September
- Competitors: 12 from 7 nations
- Winning time: 21.82

Medalists
1st place, gold medalist(s)		Evan O'Hanlon	Australia
2nd place, silver medalist(s)		Dyan Buis	South Africa
3rd place, bronze medalist(s)		Zhou Wenjun	China

Athletics at the 2012 Summer Paralympics
Classification
T/F11–13: Blind and visually impaired
T/F20: Intellectual disability
T/F31–38: Cerebral palsy
F40: Les Autres
T/F42–46: Amputees
T/F51–58: Spinal cord disability
Men T/F31–38
Track
100 m	T34	T35	T36
T37	T38
200 m	T34	T35	T36
T37	T38
400 m	T36	T38
800 m	T36	T37
1500 m	T37
Field
Long jump	F36	F37-38
Shot put	F32-33	F34
F37-38
Club throw	F31-32/51
Discus throw	F32-34	F35-36
F37-38
Javelin throw	F33-34
Women T/F31–38
Track
100 m	T34	T35	T36
T37	T38
200 m	T34	T35	T36
T37	T38
400 m	T37
4×100 m relay	T35-38
Field
Long jump	F37-38
Shot put	F32-34	F35-36
F37
Club throw	F31-32/51
Discus throw	F35-36	F37
Javelin throw	F33-34/52-53	F37-38

The Men's 200 metres T38 event at the 2012 Summer Paralympics took place at the London Olympic Stadium on 7 and 8 September.

The T38 category is for ambulant athletes with cerebral palsy. T38 athletes have the mildest form of impairment caused by cerebral palsy, often in only one limb, and not affecting the ability to run, walk or jump freely, although impairing performance. T38 athletes may suffer minor co-ordination difficulties.

== Records ==
Prior to the competition, the existing World and Paralympic records were as follows:

World & Paralympic record	Evan O'Hanlon (AUS)	21.98	14 September 2008	Beijing, China
Broken records during the 2012 Summer Paralympics
World record	Evan O'Hanlon (AUS)	21.82	8 September 2012	

== Results ==
=== Round 1 ===
Competed 7 September 2012 from 10:36. Qual. rule: first 3 in each heat (Q) plus the 2 fastest other times (q) qualified.

==== Heat 1 ====
Rank	Athlete	Country	Time	Notes
1	Evan O'Hanlon	Australia	23.10	Q
2	Edson Pinheiro	Brazil	23.87	Q, SB
3	Union Sekailwe	South Africa	24.01	Q, PB
4	Abbes Saidi	Tunisia	24.07	PB
5	Andriy Onufriyenko	Ukraine	24.17	SB
			Wind: +0.3 m/s	

==== Heat 2 ====
Rank	Athlete	Country	Time	Notes
1	Dyan Buis	South Africa	22.57	Q, RR
2	Zhou Wenjun	China	23.03	Q, RR
3	Mohamed Farhat Chida	Tunisia	23.32	Q, SB
4	Tim Sullivan	Australia	23.48	q, SB
5	Lorenzo Albaladejo Martinez	Spain	23.61	q, PB
6	Mykyta Senyk	Ukraine	24.22	
			Wind: +0.2 m/s	

=== Final ===
Competed 8 September 2012 at 11:25.

Rank	Athlete	Country	Time	Notes
1st place, gold medalist(s)	Evan O'Hanlon	Australia	21.82	WR
2nd place, silver medalist(s)	Dyan Buis	South Africa	22.51	RR
3rd place, bronze medalist(s)	Zhou Wenjun	China	22.65	RR
4	Mohamed Farhat Chida	Tunisia	22.81	PB
5	Tim Sullivan	Australia	23.57	
6	Union Sekailwe	South Africa	23.66	PB
7	Lorenzo Albaladejo Martinez	Spain	23.76	
	Edson Pinheiro	Brazil	DNS	
			Wind: -0.2 m/s	

Q = qualified by place. q = qualified by time. WR = World Record. RR = Regional Record. PB = Personal Best. SB = Seasonal Best. DNS = Did not start.
