= Athletics at the 2012 Summer Paralympics – Men's 400 metres T38 =

Men's 400 metres T38 at the XIV Paralympic Games
- Venue: London Olympic Stadium
- Dates: 2 to 3 September
- Competitors: 11 from 8 nations
- Winning time: 50.43

Medalists
| 1st place, gold medalist(s) | | Mohamed Farhat Chida | Tunisia |
| 2nd place, silver medalist(s) | | Zhou Wenjun | China |
| 3rd place, bronze medalist(s) | | Union Sekailwe | South Africa |

Athletics at the 2012 Summer Paralympics
Classification
T/F11–13: Blind and visually impaired
T/F20: Intellectual disability
T/F31–38: Cerebral palsy
F40: Les Autres
T/F42–46: Amputees
T/F51–58: Spinal cord disability
Men T/F31–38
Track
100 m | T34 | T35 | T36
T37 | T38
200 m | T34 | T35 | T36
T37 | T38
400 m | T36 | T38
800 m | T36 | T37
1500 m | T37
Field
Long jump | F36 | F37-38
Shot put | F32-33 | F34
F37-38
Club throw | F31-32/51
Discus throw | F32-34 | F35-36
F37-38
Javelin throw | F33-34
Women T/F31–38
Track
100 m | T34 | T35 | T36
T37 | T38
200 m | T34 | T35 | T36
T37 | T38
400 m | T37
4×100 m relay | T35-38
Field
Long jump | F37-38
Shot put | F32-34 | F35-36
F37
Club throw | F31-32/51
Discus throw | F35-36 | F37
Javelin throw | F33-34/52-53 | F37-38

The Men's 400 metres T38 event at the 2012 Summer Paralympics took place at the London Olympic Stadium from 2 to 3 September.

The T38 category is for ambulant athletes with cerebral palsy. T38 athletes have the mildest form of impairment caused by cerebral palsy, often in only one limb, and not affecting the ability to run, walk or jump freely, although impairing performance. T38 athletes may suffer minor co-ordination difficulties.

== Records ==
Prior to the competition, the existing World and Paralympic records were as follows:

| World & Paralympic record | Timothy Sullivan (AUS) | 50.30 | 27 October 2000 | Sydney, Australia |

== Results ==
=== Round 1 ===
Competed 2 September 2012 from 10:52. Qual. rule: first 3 in each heat (Q) plus the 2 fastest other times (q) qualified.

==== Heat 1 ====
| Rank | Athlete | Country | Class | Time | Notes |
|---|---|---|---|---|---|
| 1 | Abbes Saidi | Tunisia | T38 | 52.32 | Q, PB |
| 2 | Zhou Wenjun | China | T38 | 52.57 | Q, SB |
| 3 | Union Sekailwe | South Africa | T38 | 53.28 | Q |
| 4 | Tim Sullivan | Australia | T38 | 53.67 | q, SB |
| 5 | Marcel Houssimoli | Vanuatu | T37 | 1:09.03 | q, SB |
| 6 | Edson Pinheiro | Brazil | T38 | DQ | |

==== Heat 2 ====
| Rank | Athlete | Country | Class | Time | Notes |
|---|---|---|---|---|---|
| 1 | Marius Stander | South Africa | T38 | 53.52 | Q |
| 2 | Omar Monterola | Venezuela | T37 | 53.79 | Q, SB |
| 3 | Mohamed Farhat Chida | Tunisia | T38 | 55.12 | Q |
| 4 | Milo Toleafoa | Samoa | T37 | 1:09.97 | SB |

=== Final ===
Competed 3 September 2012 at 19:42.

| Rank | Athlete | Country | Class | Time | Notes |
|---|---|---|---|---|---|
| 1st place, gold medalist(s) | Mohamed Farhat Chida | Tunisia | T38 | 50.43 | SB |
| 2nd place, silver medalist(s) | Zhou Wenjun | China | T38 | 51.56 | RR |
| 3rd place, bronze medalist(s) | Union Sekailwe | South Africa | T38 | 51.97 | PB |
| 4 | Abbes Saidi | Tunisia | T38 | 52.05 | PB |
| 5 | Tim Sullivan | Australia | T38 | 52.39 | SB |
| 6 | Marius Stander | South Africa | T38 | 53.62 | |
| 7 | Marcel Houssimoli | Vanuatu | T37 | 1:07.61 | SB |
| | Omar Monterola | Venezuela | T37 | DNF | |

Q = qualified by place. q = qualified by time. RR = Regional Record. PB = Personal Best. DNF = Did not finish.
