= Athletics at the 2012 Summer Paralympics – Women's 100 metres T37 =

Track & field event

Women's 100 metres T37 at the XIV Paralympic Games
- Venue: London Olympic Stadium
- Dates: 2 September
- Competitors: 15 from 11 nations

Medalists
1st place, gold medalist(s)		Mandy Francois-Elie	France
2nd place, silver medalist(s)		Johanna Benson	Namibia
3rd place, bronze medalist(s)		Neda Bahi	Tunisia

Athletics at the 2012 Summer Paralympics
Classification
T/F11–13: Blind and visually impaired
T/F20: Intellectual disability
T/F31–38: Cerebral palsy
F40: Les Autres
T/F42–46: Amputees
T/F51–58: Spinal cord disability
Men T/F31–38
Track
100 m	T34	T35	T36
T37	T38
200 m	T34	T35	T36
T37	T38
400 m	T36	T38
800 m	T36	T37
1500 m	T37
Field
Long jump	F36	F37-38
Shot put	F32-33	F34
F37-38
Club throw	F31-32/51
Discus throw	F32-34	F35-36
F37-38
Javelin throw	F33-34
Women T/F31–38
Track
100 m	T34	T35	T36
T37	T38
200 m	T34	T35	T36
T37	T38
400 m	T37
4×100 m relay	T35-38
Field
Long jump	F37-38
Shot put	F32-34	F35-36
F37
Club throw	F31-32/51
Discus throw	F35-36	F37
Javelin throw	F33-34/52-53	F37-38

The Women's 100 metres T37 event at the 2012 Summer Paralympics took place at the London Olympic Stadium on 2 September.

The T37 category is for ambulant athletes with cerebral palsy. These athletes have movement and coordination problems on one half of their body. They have good ability in their dominant side of their body (ie hemiplegia).

== Results ==
=== Round 1 ===
Competed 2 September 2012 from 11:05. Qual. rule: first 3 in each heat (Q) plus the 2 fastest other times (q) qualified.

==== Heat 1 ====
Rank	Athlete	Country	Time	Notes
1	Mandy Francois-Elie	France	14.30	Q
2	Oksana Krechunyak	Ukraine	14.40	Q, PB
3	Neda Bahi	Tunisia	14.53	Q, PB
4	Katrina Hart	Great Britain	14.71	q
5	Isabelle Foerder	Germany	14.82	
6	Svetlana Sergeeva	Russia	14.89	
7	Marta Langner	Poland	15.00	SB
8	Matthildur Thorsteinsdottir	Iceland	15.89	=PB
			Wind: +1.0 m/s	

==== Heat 2 ====
Rank	Athlete	Country	Time	Notes
1	Maria Seifert	Germany	14.30	Q
2	Jenny McLoughlin	Great Britain	14.48	Q, PB
3	Viktoriya Kravchenko	Ukraine	14.58	Q
4	Johanna Benson	Namibia	14.63	q, PB
5	Cao Yuanhang	China	14.76	RR
6	Anastasiya Ovsyannikova	Russia	14.90	
7	Heather Jameson	Ireland	15.08	PB
			Wind: -0.3 m/s	

=== Final ===
Competed 2 September 2012 at 20:17.

Rank	Athlete	Country	Time	Notes
1st place, gold medalist(s)	Mandy François-Elie	France	14.08	RR
2nd place, silver medalist(s)	Johanna Benson	Namibia	14.23	RR
3rd place, bronze medalist(s)	Neda Bahi	Tunisia	14.36	PB
4	Maria Seifert	Germany	14.37	
5	Oksana Krechunyak	Ukraine	14.37	PB
6	Katrina Hart	Great Britain	14.41	
7	Jenny McLoughlin	Great Britain	14.48	=PB
8	Viktoriya Kravchenko	Ukraine	14.48	
			Wind: +0.7 m/s	

Q = qualified by place. q = qualified by time. RR = Regional Record. PB = Personal Best. SB = Seasonal Best.
