= Mel Nicholls =

British wheelchair racer

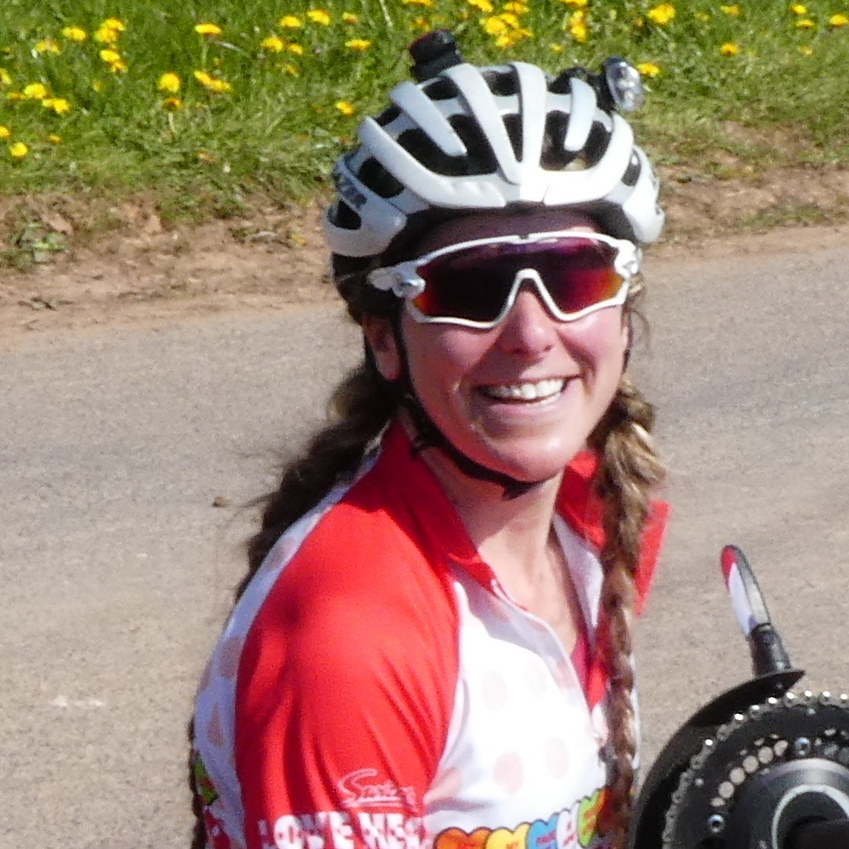
- in 2021

Personal information
- Born: 17 July 1977 (age 48) Worcester, United Kingdom

Sport
- Country: Great Britain
- Sport: Wheelchair racing
- Event(s): sprint middle distance
- Club: Coventry Godiva Harriers
- Coached by: Job King [club] Paula Dunn [national]

Achievements and titles
- Paralympic finals: 2012
Medal record
Representing Great Britain
Women's para-athletics
World Championships
Silver medal – second place	2015 Doha	800 m T34
European Championships
Silver medal – second place	2014 Swansea	800m – T34
Bronze medal – third place	2014 Swansea	100m – T34
Women's paratriathlon
European Championships
Silver medal – second place	2023 Madrid	PTWC
Silver medal – second place	2025 Besançon	PTWC

Melissa Nicholls (born 17 July 1977) is a British wheelchair athlete specialising in middle-distance events in the T34 classification. Nicholls competed in the 2012 Summer Paralympics and won a silver medal in the 800m at the 2015 IPC Athletics World Championships.

== Personal history ==
Nicholls was born in Worcester in 1977. She studied Equine Science at Hartpury College and works as a teaching assistant at Winchcombe Abbey School.

Nicholls was involved in a serious car accident which left her with heart complications. From 2001 she had a series of strokes, while a stroke in 2008 left her unable to use her left arm and leg. In April 2009 doctors discovered a hole in her heart for which she underwent corrective surgery.

In 2020, Nicholls had a 5 kg ovarian tumour removed at Cheltenham General Hospital.

== Career history ==
Nicholls first wheelchair race was at Stoke Gifford at an open event in 2010. In 2011, she was classified as a T34 athlete and that summer attended multiple meets across Britain as well as events in Switzerland and Netherlands competing in the 100m, 200m, 400m and 800m races.

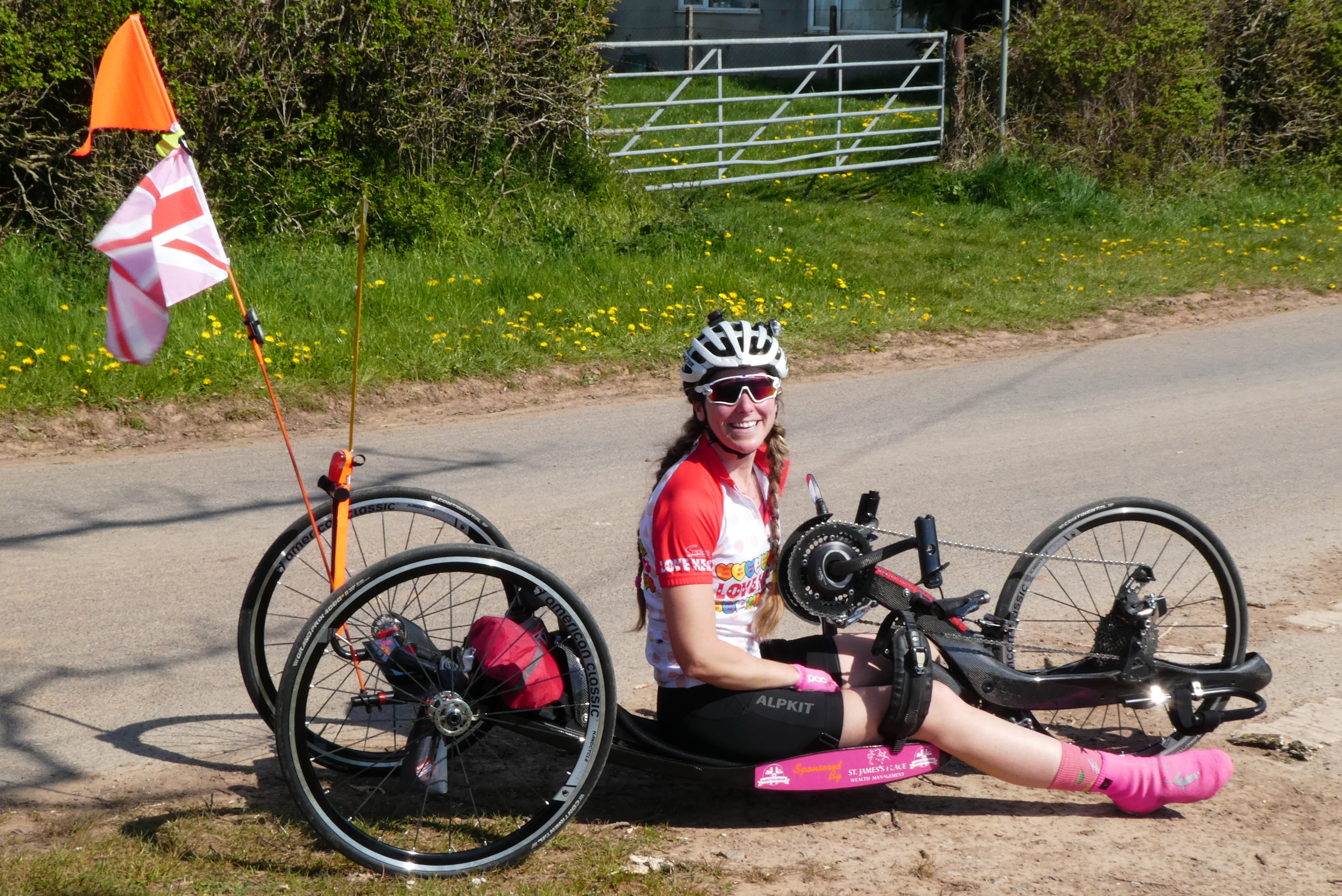
Mel Nicholls on her handbike in 2021

By early 2012 Nicholls had posted a sub-21 second 100m sprint and qualified for the Summer Paralympics in London, as part of the Great Britain team, in both the 100m and 200m events. In the 100m she was drawn in the first heat but her time of 22.41 saw her fail to progress to the final. In the 200m heats she finished fourth and qualified for the final. Nicholls finished seventh with a time of 40.00.

In 2014 Nicholls represented Britain in the IPC Athletics European Championships in Swansea. There she won her first major international medals, with a bronze in the T34 100m, and a silver in her favoured 800m event. In the 800m Nicholls finished just a second behind teammate Hannah Cockroft with a time of 2:16.68.

In 2019, Nicholls set a new world record, handcycling from Land's End to John O'Groats in under seven days. In 2021, she undertook a 75-day, 4,800-mile handcycle journey around the coast of the United Kingdom, starting and finishing in her hometown of Tewkesbury, and raising £1,590 for Ovarian Cancer Action.
