= Kieran Tscherniawsky =

British Paralympic athlete (born 1992)

Personal information
- Nationality: British
- Born: 18 January 1992 (age 34) Boston, England
- Height: 170 cm (5 ft 7 in) (2012)
- Weight: 70 kg (154 lb) (2012)

Sport
- Country: Great Britain
- Sport: Athletics
- Event: F33 Discus
- Coached by: Jim Edwards

Achievements and titles
- Paralympic finals: 2012 London; 2016 Rio de Janeiro
- Personal best: Discus: 31.51m
Medal record
IPC European Championships
Silver medal – second place	2014 Swansea	Discus – F34

Kieran Tscherniawsky (born 18 January 1992) is a Paralympian athlete from England competing mainly in category F33 discus. In 2011, he became the World Junior Champion in the discus and qualified for the Great Britain team at the 2012 Summer Paralympics. He was a repeat member of the team at the 2016 Summer Paralympics.

Tscherniawsky was born in Boston, Lincolnshire in England in 1992. Tscherniawsky, who has cerebral palsy, took up wheelchair basketball at the age of eleven. After visiting Stoke Mandeville at the age of 16, he became part of the GB development squad, focusing on power lifting. He eventually gravitated towards the throwing events, specialising in the shot put and discus. He began competing at the age of 17.

In 2009, he competed in both shot put and discus, but by 2010 he dropped the shot to concentrate on discus alone. His personal best in the discus in 2009 was a throw of 21.34m at a meet in Nottingham in September. A year later, back at Nottingham, Tscherniawsky recorded a throw of 27.65 in the discus, his seventh personal best of the year. In 2011, he was selected as part of the Great Britain team to attend the 2011 IPC Athletics World Championships in New Zealand. Tscherniawsky threw 27.52 to finish seventh. Three months later, at the Junior World Championship in Dubai, he threw a personal best of 28.06 to take first place. Before the end of the year Tscherniawsky had improved his discus further, posting a distance of 29.57, which gave him the gold at the England Senior Championships.

In 2012, Tscherniawsky broke the 30 metre mark in two competitions; 30.23 at the National Athletics Championships in Dublin, and then improved that again in July with a personal best of 30.99 at the BWAA Grand Prix at Stoke Mandeville. His performance in the meets leading up to the 2012 Summer Paralympics saw him qualify for the Great Britain team at the Games in London, competing in the F32–34 discus category. At the Paralympic Games, his best throw of 29.05m equated to 925 points, which saw him finish in 10th place. The next year, Tscherniawsky improved on his personal best in the discus with a distance of 31.51 at the Cheshire & Manchester County Championships in May. In June, he represented Great Britain at the 2013 IPC Athletics World Championships, held in Lyon. He entered two events, the shot put and discus throw. In the shot put, he recorded 9.76m to finish seventh, while in his preferred discus he threw 29.14m to finish fifth.
