= 2014 IPC Athletics European Championships – Women's 800 metres =

The women's 800 metres at the 2014 IPC Athletics European Championships was held at the Swansea University Stadium from 18 to 23 August. Only final events were contested; no heat events were taken part.

== Medalists ==
Event	Gold		Silver		Bronze	
T34	Hannah Cockroft; Great Britain	2:15.16	Melissa Nicholls; Great Britain	2:16.68	Amy Siemons; Netherlands	2:36.40
T53	Samantha Kinghorn; Great Britain	2:18.40	—		—	
T54	Manuela Schaer; Switzerland	2:00.93	Jade Jones; Great Britain	2:04.11	Alexandra Helbling; Switzerland	2:04.71

== Results ==
=== T34 ===
Final

Rank	Sport Class	Name	Nationality	Time	Notes
1st place, gold medalist(s)	T34	Hannah Cockroft	Great Britain	2:15.16	
2nd place, silver medalist(s)	T34	Melissa Nicholls	Great Britain	2:16.68	
3rd place, bronze medalist(s)	T34	Amy Siemons	Netherlands	2:36.40	
4	T34	Luna Jansen	Netherlands	3:07.62	
5	T34	Desiree Vranken	Netherlands	3:38.84	

=== T53 ===
Final

Rank	Sport Class	Name	Nationality	Time	Notes
1st place, gold medalist(s)	T53	Samantha Kinghorn	Great Britain	2:18.40	
2	T53	Hamide Kurt	Turkey	2:19.47	

=== T54 ===
Final

Rank	Sport Class	Name	Nationality	Time	Notes
1st place, gold medalist(s)	T54	Manuela Schaer	Switzerland	2:00.93	
2nd place, silver medalist(s)	T54	Jade Jones	Great Britain	2:04.11	
3rd place, bronze medalist(s)	T54	Alexandra Helbling	Switzerland	2:04.71	
4	T54	Gunilla Wallengren	Sweden	2:05.56	
5	T54	Shelly Woods	Great Britain	2:05.72	
6	T54	Amanda Kotaja	Finland	2:07.01	
7	T54	Margriet van den Broek	Netherlands	2:08.48	
8	T54	Patricia Keller	Switzerland	2:10.33	

== See also ==
- List of IPC world records in athletics
