= Athletics at the 2012 Summer Paralympics =

Athletics at the XIV Paralympic Games
- Venue: Olympic Stadium; The Mall
- Dates: 31 August – 9 September 2012
- Competitors: 1133 (759 men, 374 women) from 141 nations

Athletics events at the 2012 Summer Paralympics were held in the Olympic Stadium and in The Mall in London, United Kingdom, from 31 August to 9 September 2012.

== Classification ==
Athletes were given a classification depending on the type and extent of their disability. The classification system allowed athletes to compete against others with a similar level of function.

The athletics classifications are:

- 11–13: Blind (11) and visually impaired (12, 13) athletes
- 20: Athletes with an intellectual disability
- 31–38: Athletes with cerebral palsy
- 40: Les Autres (others) (including people with dwarfism)
- 42–46: Amputees
- 51–58: Athletes with a spinal cord disability

The class numbers were given prefixes of "T", "F" and "P" for track, field and pentathlon events, respectively.

Visually impaired athletes classified 11 run with full eye shades and a guide runner; those classified 12 have the option of using a guide; those classified 13 did not use a guide runner. Guide runners were awarded medals alongside their athletes.

== Participating nations ==
1133 athletes from 141 nations competed.

- Algeria (23)
- Angola (4)
- Antigua and Barbuda (1)
- Argentina (8)
- Australia (43)
- Austria (6)
- Azerbaijan (8)
- Bahrain (2)
- Belarus (7)
- Belgium (3)
- Benin (1)
- Bermuda (1)
- Bosnia and Herzegovina (1)
- Brazil (35)
- Brunei (1)
- Bulgaria (7)
- Burundi (1)
- Cambodia (1)
- Canada (22)
- Cape Verde (1)
- Central African Republic (1)
- Chile (1)
- China (80)
- Chinese Taipei (4)
- Colombia (11)
- Costa Rica (1)
- Croatia (14)
- Cuba (11)
- Cyprus (1)
- Czech Republic (15)
- Denmark (6)
- Djibouti (1)
- Dominican Republic (1)
- Democratic Republic of the Congo (2)
- Egypt (6)
- El Salvador (1)
- Estonia (2)
- Ethiopia (4)
- Fiji (1)
- Finland (7)
- France (25)
- Gabon (1)
- The Gambia (2)
- Germany (33)
- Ghana (2)
- Great Britain (48)
- Greece (25)
- Guatemala (1)
- Guinea-Bissau (2)
- Haiti (2)
- Honduras (1)
- Hong Kong (2)
- Hungary (4)
- Iceland (2)
- India (5)
- Indonesia (1)
- Iran (16)
- Iraq (8)
- Ireland (10)
- Israel (1)
- Italy (11)
- Ivory Coast (2)
- Jamaica (3)
- Japan (36)
- Jordan (3)
- Kazakhstan (3)
- Kenya (13)
- Kuwait (5)
- Latvia (6)
- Lesotho (1)
- Libya (1)
- Lithuania (4)
- Macau (1)
- Madagascar (1)
- Malaysia (8)
- Mali (1)
- Mauritania (2)
- Mauritius (1)
- Mexico (38)
- Mongolia (1)
- Montenegro (1)
- Morocco (15)
- Mozambique (2)
- Myanmar (1)
- Namibia (4)
- Nepal (2)
- Netherlands (11)
- New Zealand (3)
- Nicaragua (2)
- Niger (2)
- Nigeria (9)
- Norway (1)
- Oman (1)
- Pakistan (2)
- Palestine (2)
- Panama (2)
- Papua New Guinea (1)
- Peru (1)
- Philippines (4)
- Poland (31)
- Portugal (15)
- Puerto Rico (1)
- Qatar (1)
- Romania (1)
- Russia (53)
- Rwanda (2)
- Samoa (2)
- San Marino (1)
- Saudi Arabia (3)
- Senegal (1)
- Serbia (4)
- Sierra Leone (1)
- Slovakia (4)
- Slovenia (4)
- Solomon Islands (1)
- South Africa (25)
- South Korea (6)
- Spain (24)
- Sri Lanka (5)
- Suriname (1)
- Sweden (7)
- Switzerland (12)
- Syria (2)
- Tanzania (1)
- Thailand (15)
- Timor-Leste (1)
- Tonga (1)
- Trinidad and Tobago (1)
- Tunisia (31)
- Turkey (5)
- Turkmenistan (1)
- Uganda (2)
- Ukraine (31)
- United Arab Emirates (11)
- United States (54)
- Uzbekistan (6)
- Vanuatu (1)
- Venezuela (15)
- Vietnam (3)
- Zambia (2)
- Zimbabwe (1)

== Medal summary ==
=== Medal table ===
Rank	Nation	Gold	Silver	Bronze	Total
1	China (CHN)	33	29	24	86
2	Russia (RUS)	19	12	5	36
3	Great Britain (GBR)	11	7	11	29
4	United States (USA)	9	6	13	28
5	Tunisia (TUN)	9	5	5	19
6	Ukraine (UKR)	8	7	7	22
7	Brazil (BRA)	7	8	3	18
8	Cuba (CUB)	7	4	0	11
9	Poland (POL)	6	7	5	18
10	Australia (AUS)	5	9	13	27
11	Iran (IRI)	5	5	3	13
12	Germany (GER)	5	3	10	18
13	South Africa (RSA)	4	7	6	17
14	Algeria (ALG)	4	6	6	16
15	France (FRA)	4	4	5	13
16	Ireland (IRL)	4	1	1	6
17	Spain (ESP)	3	2	0	5
18	Morocco (MAR)	3	0	3	6
19	Italy (ITA)	2	3	1	6
20	Mexico (MEX)	2	2	5	9
21	Kenya (KEN)	2	2	2	6
22	Serbia (SRB)	2	1	0	3
23	Austria (AUT)	2	0	3	5
24	Finland (FIN)	2	0	1	3
25	Canada (CAN)	1	5	3	9
26	Netherlands (NED)	1	4	2	7
26	Switzerland (SUI)	1	4	2	7
28	Azerbaijan (AZE)	1	1	2	4
29	Belgium (BEL)	1	1	1	3
30	Latvia (LAT)	1	1	0	2
30	Namibia (NAM)	1	1	0	2
32	Angola (ANG)	1	0	1	2
32	Denmark (DEN)	1	0	1	2
34	Chile (CHI)	1	0	0	1
34	Fiji (FIJ)	1	0	0	1
34	Jamaica (JAM)	1	0	0	1
37	Japan (JPN)	0	3	1	4
38	Croatia (CRO)	0	2	2	4
38	Thailand (THA)	0	2	2	4
40	Bulgaria (BUL)	0	2	1	3
40	Czech Republic (CZE)	0	2	1	3
40	South Korea (KOR)	0	2	1	3
43	Greece (GRE)	0	1	4	5
44	Egypt (EGY)	0	1	2	3
45	Iraq (IRQ)	0	1	1	2
45	United Arab Emirates (UAE)	0	1	1	2
47	Colombia (COL)	0	1	0	1
47	Ethiopia (ETH)	0	1	0	1
47	Hong Kong (HKG)	0	1	0	1
47	India (IND)	0	1	0	1
47	Saudi Arabia (KSA)	0	1	0	1
47	Sweden (SWE)	0	1	0	1
53	Belarus (BLR)	0	0	2	2
54	Argentina (ARG)	0	0	1	1
54	Hungary (HUN)	0	0	1	1
54	Malaysia (MAS)	0	0	1	1
54	Nigeria (NGR)	0	0	1	1
54	Norway (NOR)	0	0	1	1
54	Portugal (POR)	0	0	1	1
54	Sri Lanka (SRI)	0	0	1	1
54	Venezuela (VEN)	0	0	1	1
Totals (61 entries)		170	170	170	510

== Events ==
For each of the events below, medals are contested for one or more of the above classifications.

Track Events

- Men's 100 m

• T11 • T12 • T13
• T34 • T35 • T36 • T37 • T38
• T42 • T44 • T46
• T51 • T52 • T53 • T54

- Men's 200 m

• T11 • T12 • T13
• T34 • T35 • T36 • T37 • T38
• T42 • T44 • T46
• T52 • T53

- Men's 400 m

• T11 • T12 • T13
• T36 • T38
• T44 • T46
• T52 • T53 • T54

- Men's 800 m

• T12 • T13
• T36 • T37
• T52 • T53

- Men's 1500 m

• T11 • T13
• T20 • T37
• T46 • T54

- Men's 5000 m

• T11 • T12 • T54

- Men's 4 × 100 m relay

• T11-13 • T42-46

- Men's 4 × 400 m relay

• T53-54

- Men's Marathon

• T12 • T46 • T54

- Women's 100 m

• T11 • T12 • T13
• T34 • T35 • T36 • T37 • T38
• T42 • T44 • T46
• T52 • T53 • T54

- Women's 200 m

• T11 • T12
• T34 • T35 • T36 • T37 • T38
• T44 • T46
• T52 • T53

- Women's 400 m

• T12 • T13
• T53 • T54

- Women's 800 m

• T53 • T54

- Women's 1500 m

• T12 • T20 • T54

- Women's 5000 m

• T54

- Women's 4 × 100 m relay

• T35-38

- Women's Marathon

• T54

Field Events

- Men's Club throw

• F31/32/51

- Men's Discus throw

• F11 • F32-34 • F35-36
• F37-38 • F40 • F42
• F44 • F51-53 • F54-56
• F57-58

- Men's High jump

• F42 • F46

- Men's Javelin throw

• F12-13 • F33-34
• F40 • F42 • F44
• F52-53 • F54-56 • F57-58

- Men's Long jump

• F11 • F13 • F20
• F36 • F37-38 • F42-44
• F46

- Men's Triple jump

• F11 • F12 • F46

- Men's Shot put

• F11-12
• F20 • F32-33 • F34
• F40 • F42-44 • F46
• F52-53 • F54-56 • F57-58

- Women's Club throw

• F31/32/51

- Women's Discus throw

• F11-12 • F35-36 • F37
• F40 • F51-53 • F57-58

- Women's Javelin throw

• F12-13 • F33-34/52-53 • F37-38
• F46 • F54-56 • F57-58

- Women's Long jump

• F11-12 • F13 • F20
• F37-38 • F42-44 • F46

- Women's Shot put

• F11-12 • F20 • F32-34
• F35-36 • F37 • F40
• F42-44 • F54-56 • F57-58

== See also ==
- Athletics at the 2012 Summer Olympics
