= Oleksii Pashkov =

Ukrainian Paralympic athlete (born 1981)

Personal information
- Nationality: Ukrainian
- Born: 6 January 1981 (age 45) Zaporozhye, Ukraine

Sport
- Country: Ukraine
- Sport: Athletics
- Disability: Cerebral palsy
- Disability class: F36
- Club: Invasport: Zaporozhye
- Coached by: Andriy Fateev (national); Tamara Edisherashvili (personal)
Medal record
Men's Athletics
Representing Ukraine
Paralympic Games
Silver medal – second place	2012 London	Discus – F35/36

Oleksii Pashkov (born 6 January 1981) is a Ukrainian track and field athlete who competes in disability athletics in the F36 category. Pashkov represented his country in the discus throw at the 2012 Summer Paralympics in London, where he won the silver medal with a distance of 38.89 metres.
