= Amy Siemons =

Dutch Paralympic athlete

Personal information
- Nationality: Dutch
- Born: 18 May 1985 (age 41) Eindhoven, Netherlands
- Height: 1.72 m (5 ft 8 in)
- Weight: 57 kg (126 lb)

Sport
- Sport: Wheelchair racing
- Disability class: T34
- Coached by: Arno Mul
- Retired: 2021
Medal record
Representing Netherlands
Paralympic Games
| Silver medal – second place | 2012 London | T34 100 m |
| Silver medal – second place | 2012 London | T34 200 m |
IPC Athletics World Championships
| Silver medal – second place | 2013 Lyon | T34 100 m |
| Bronze medal – third place | 2013 Lyon | T34 200 m |
| Bronze medal – third place | 2015 Doha | T34 100 m |
IPC Athletics European Championships
| Silver medal – second place | 2014 Swansea | T34 100 m |
| Bronze medal – third place | 2014 Swansea | T34 800 m |
- Updated on 7 Dec 2014

Amy Siemons (born 18 May 1985) is a Dutch wheelchair racer. Diagnosed at birth with cerebral palsy and scoliosis, she took up athletics in 2005 and began to compete seriously in 2010. Her disability classification is T34. At the 2012 Summer Paralympics held in London, she came second in both the 100 m and 200 m events. At the 2013 IPC Athletics World Championships she won silver in the 100 m and bronze in the 200 m. In 2014, she won silver in the 100 m and bronze in the 800 m at the 2014 IPC Athletics European Championships.
