= Kristy Pond =

Australian Paralympic athlete

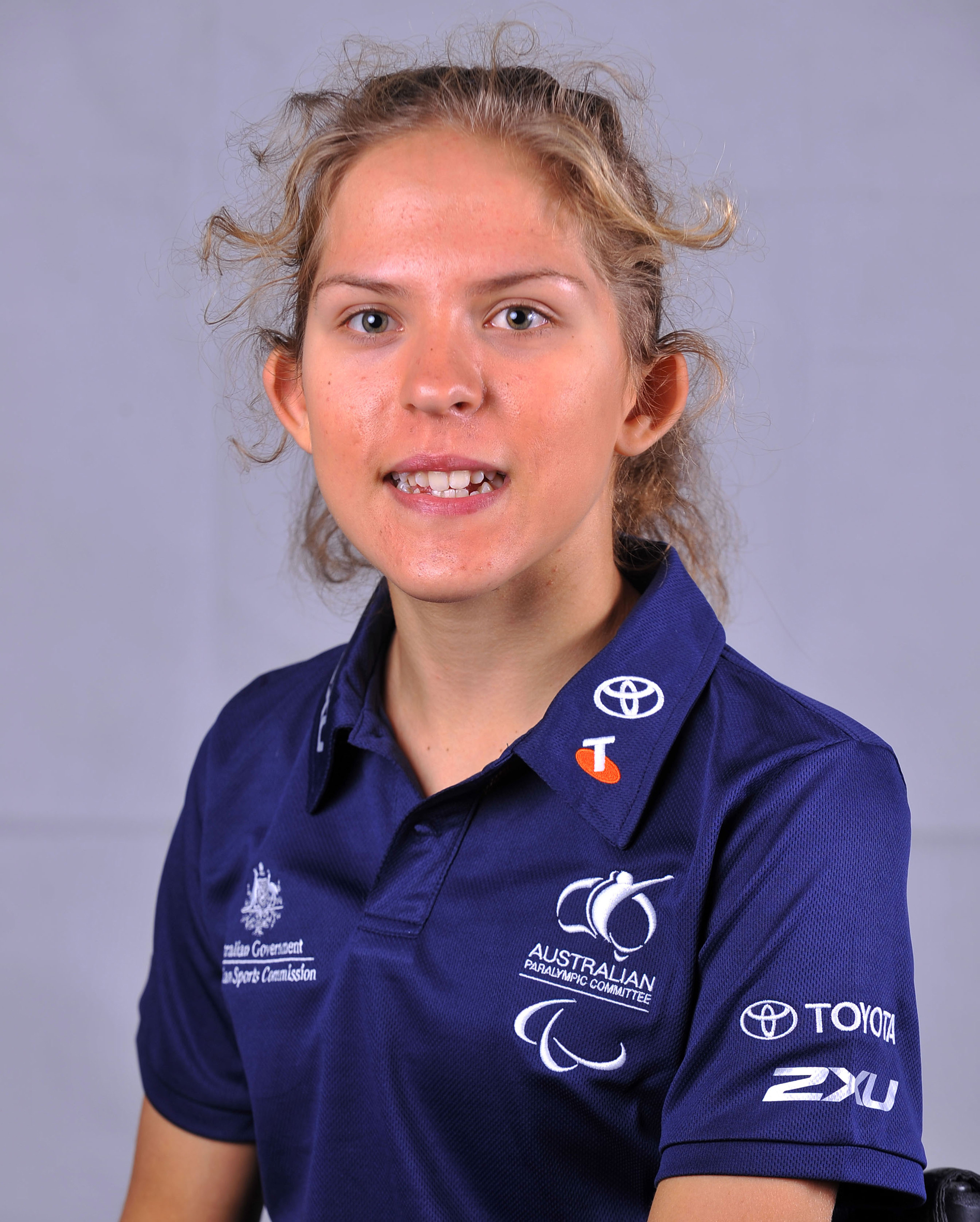
- 2012 Australian Paralympic team portrait of Pond

Personal information
- Nationality: Australian
- Born: 25 July 1996 (age 29)

Sport
- Country: Australia
- Sport: Athletics
- Event(s): 100 metres 200 metres
- Club: Hills District Senior Athletics Club

Kristy Pond (born 25 July 1996) is an Australian athletics competitor. She was selected to represent Australia at the 2012 Summer Paralympics in athletics in the 100 metre and 200 metre events. She did not medal at the 2012 Games.

== Personal ==
Pond was born on 25 July 1996, and is from Baulkham Hills, New South Wales. She has cerebral palsy.

In 2010, Pond earned the title Parramatta Sportsperson of the Year. She earned the 2011 Junior Sports Star award from the Parramatta Advertiser. Cerebral Palsy Sport and Recreation Association, an organisation she belongs to, nominated her for the award. In 2012, she was named the NSW Young Athlete with a Disability. As of 2012, she is a student.

== Athletics ==
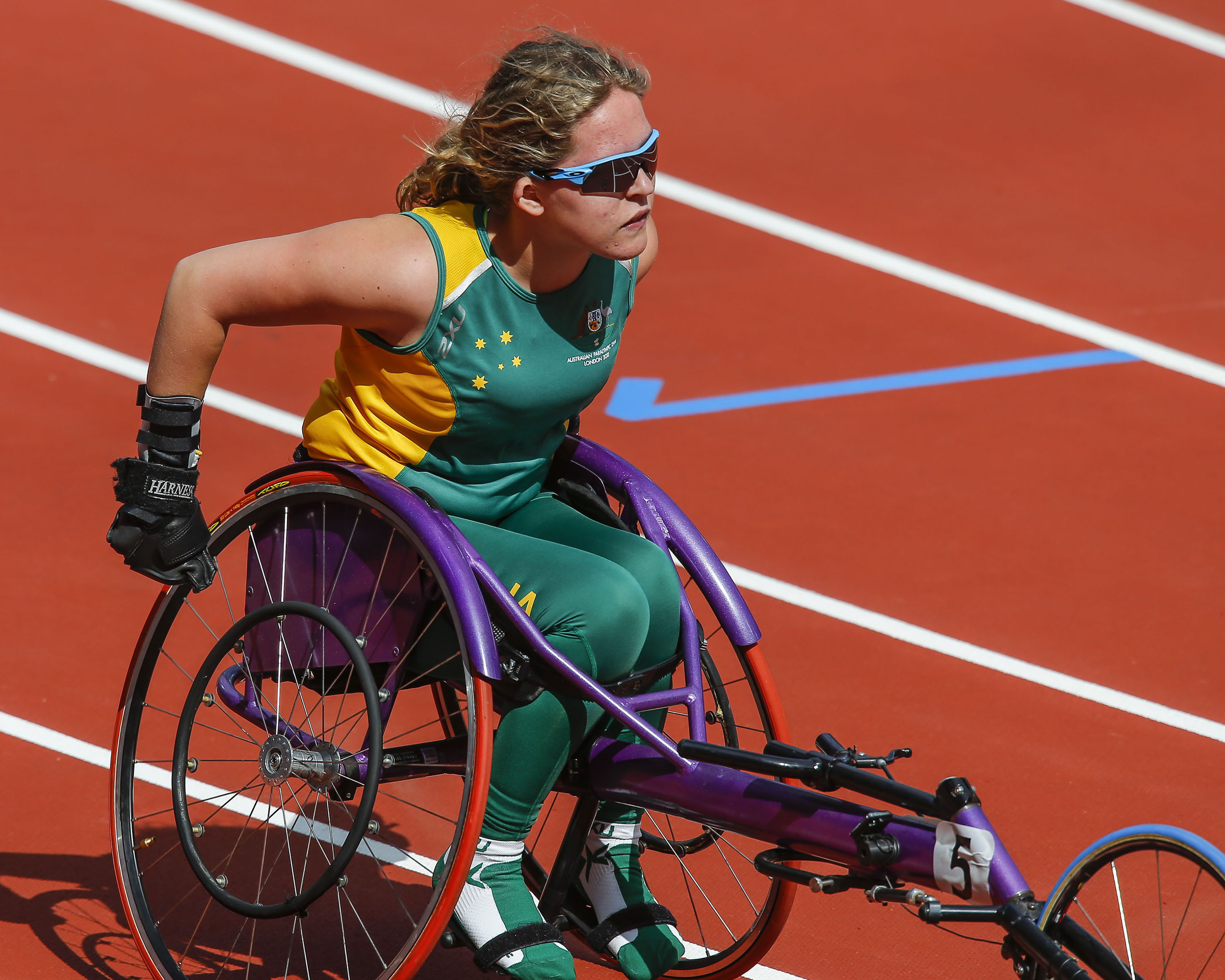
Pond at the 2012 London Paralympics

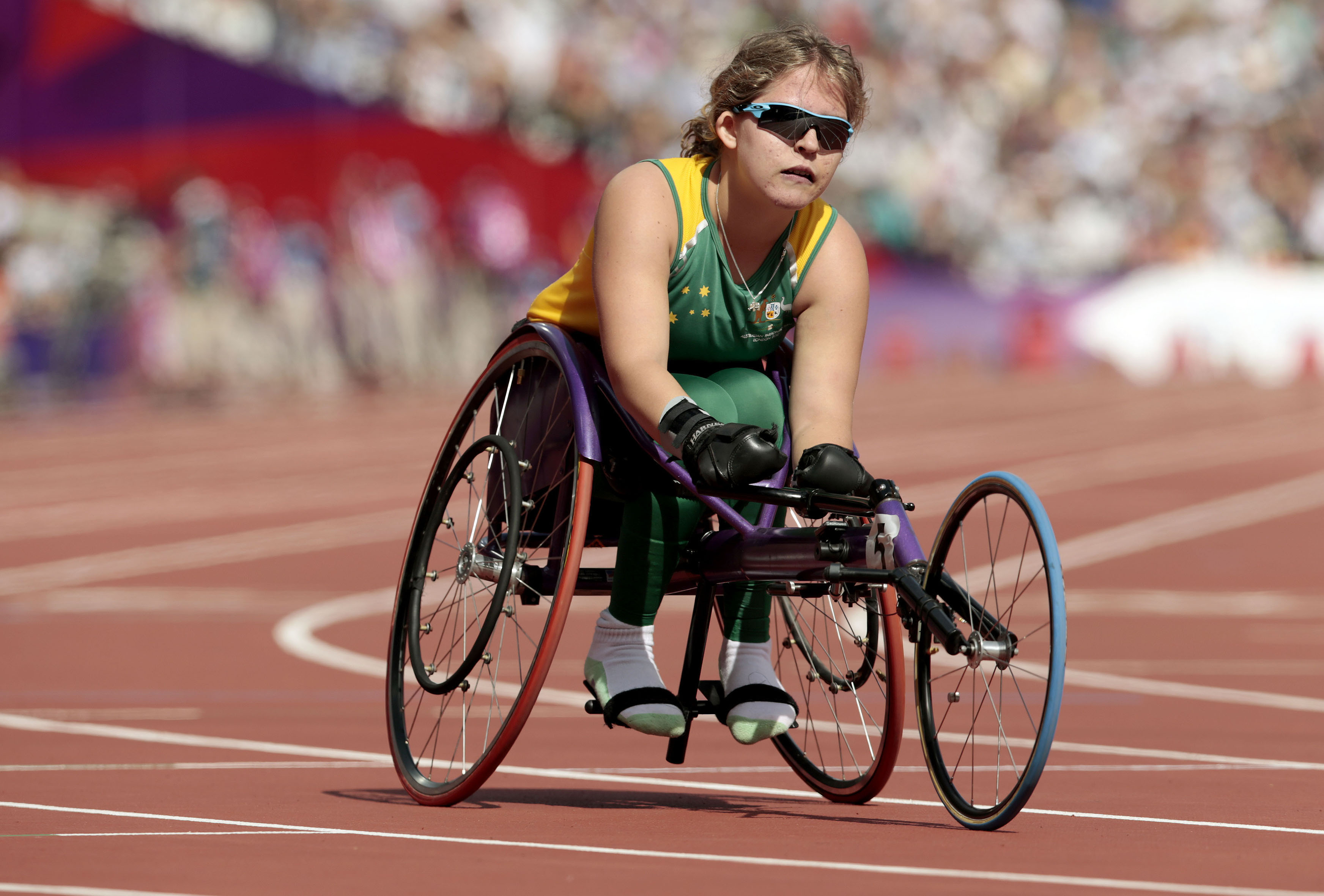
Pond at the 2012 London Paralympics

Pond is a T34 classified athletics wheelchair racer. She is a member of the Hills District Senior Athletics Club. She has an athletics scholarship with the New South Wales Institute of Sport, and is coached by her mother, Jenny Pond, and Paralympian Louise Sauvage.

Pond started competing in 2008. At the 2008 Pacific School Games, she set four Australian records while earning five gold medals. At the 2010 National Underage Championships, she earned six gold medals. In 2010, she competed in the Australian National Athletics With Disability championship. She set Australian records in the 400m, 800m, 1500m wheelchair races and javelin events, while finishing first in the 100m, 400m, 800m, 1500m, shot put and javelin events. She participated in the Queen's Baton event that preceded the 2010 Commonwealth Games. At the 2011 IWAS World Games, she finished third in the 100 metre event and first in the 800 metre event. At the 2011 Arafura Games, she finished first in the Women' Javelin Throw Wheel Chair event with a distance of 7.89 metres. She also finished first in the Women's 400m Wheel Chair event. She also finished first in the 800 metres event with a time of 2:58.74. In May 2011, she was named the IPC Athlete of the Month.

In January 2012, Pond participated in a national team training camp. In January 2012, she participated in the Australia Day Series in Canberra, where she finished third with a time of 38.43 in the junior race. She was selected to represent Australia at the 2012 Summer Paralympics in athletics in the 100 metre and 200 metre events. The Games were her first. She did not medal at the 2012 Games.
