= Tunisia at the 2012 Summer Paralympics =

- IPC code: TUN
- NPC: Tunisian Paralympic Committee

in London
- Competitors: 31 in 1 sport
- Flag bearer: Abderrahim Zhiou
- Medals Ranked 14th: Gold 9 Silver 5 Bronze 5 Total 19

Summer Paralympics appearances (overview)
- 1988; 1992; 1996; 2000; 2004; 2008; 2012; 2016; 2020; 2024

Tunisia competed at the 2012 Summer Paralympics in London, United Kingdom from August 29 to September 9, 2012. This was the nation's seventh appearance at the Summer Paralympics since 1988. The Tunisian Paralympic Committee sent a total of 31 athletes to the Games, 18 men and 13 women to compete in Athletics only.

Tunisia left London with a total of 19 Paralympic medals ( 9 gold, 5 silver and 5 bronze ).

== Medallists ==
Tunisia finished the 2012 Games with 9 gold, 5 silver and 5 bronze medals. This put them 14th overall on the medal list. They were one of two African countries to finish in the top 20 countries by medal, with South Africa the other country in 18th position with 8 gold, 12 silver and 9 bronze medals.

Medal	Name	Sport	Event	Date
Gold	Neda Bahi	Athletics	Women's 400m T37	31 August
Gold	Raoua Tlili	Athletics	Women's club throw F31/32/51	31 August
Gold	Walid Ktila	Athletics	Men's 200m T34	1 September
Gold	Walid Ktila	Athletics	Men's 100m T34	1 September
Gold	Mahmoud Khaldi	Athletics	Men's 400m T12	1 September
Gold	Abderrahim Zhiou	Athletics	Men's 1500m T13	1 September
Gold	Abderrahim Zhiou	Athletics	Men's 800m T12	1 September
Gold	Maroua Ibrahmi	Athletics	Women's club throw F31/32/51	1 September
Gold	Farhat Chida	Athletics	Men 400m T38	3 September
Silver	Abderrahim Zhiou	Athletics	Men's 5000m T12	31 August
Silver	Mohamed Charmi	Athletics	Men's 800m T37	31 August
Silver	Somaya Bousaid	Athletics	Women's 400m T13	31 August
Silver	Raoua Tlili	Athletics	Women's discus throw F40	31 August
Silver	Hania Aidi	Athletics	Women's javelin throw F54/55/56	31 August
Bronze	Abderrahim Zhiou	Athletics	Men's marathon T12	31 August
Bronze	Mohamed Charmi	Athletics	Men's 1500m T37	31 August
Bronze	Mohamed Zemzemi	Athletics	Men's discus throw F51/52/53	31 August
Bronze	Neda Bahi	Athletics	Women's 100m T37	31 August
Bronze	Maroua Ibrahmi	Athletics	Women's shot put F32/33	31 August

== Athletics ==
Men's track

Athlete	Event	Heats		Semifinal		Final	
Athlete	Event	Result	Rank	Result	Rank	Result	Rank
Ahmed Aouadi	100m T54	14.51	4	did not advance			
Ahmed Aouadi	400m T54	DQ		did not advance			
Ahmed Aouadi	800m T54	1:38.84	5	did not advance			
Ahmed Aouadi	1500m T54	3:20.35	6	did not advance			
Mohamed Charmi	800m T37	—N/a				2:01.45	2nd place, silver medalist(s)
Mohamed Charmi	1500m T37	—N/a				4:14.90	3rd place, bronze medalist(s)
Mohamed Farhat Chida	100m T38	—N/a				11.44	4
Mohamed Farhat Chida	200m T38	23.32 SB	3 Q	—N/a		22.81	4
Mohamed Farhat Chida	400m T38	55.12	3 Q	—N/a		50.43 SB	1st place, gold medalist(s)
Mohamed Fouzai	800m T46	1:58.08 SB	1 Q	—N/a		1:54.94	4
Mohamed Fouzai	1500m T46	4:01.23	3 Q	—N/a		3:58.79	5
Mahmoud Khaldi	200m T12	22.63	2 q	22.88	3	did not advance	
Mahmoud Khaldi	400m T12	50.58 SB	1 Q	49.02 SB	1 Q	48.52 WR	1st place, gold medalist(s)
Walid Ktila	100m T34	15.95 PR	1 Q	—N/a		15.91 PR	1st place, gold medalist(s)
Walid Ktila	200m T34	27.98 WR	1 Q	—N/a		27.98 WR	1st place, gold medalist(s)
Hatem Nasrallah	800m T12	2:03.83	2	did not advance			
Hatem Nasrallah	1500m T13	4:13.27	10	did not advance			
Hatem Nasrallah	Marathon T12	—N/a				2:57:08	11
Faycel Othmani	800m T37	—N/a				2:09.35	7
Faycel Othmani	1500m T37	—N/a				4:19.94	5
Abbes Saidi	200m T38	24.07	4	did not advance			
Abbes Saidi	400m T38	52.32	1 Q	—N/a		52.05	4
Abderrahim Zhiou	800m T12	1:55.99	1 Q	—N/a		1:56.42	1st place, gold medalist(s)
Abderrahim Zhiou	1500m T13	3:55.43	3 Q	—N/a		3:48.31 WR	1st place, gold medalist(s)
Abderrahim Zhiou	5000m T12	—N/a				14:19.97 PB	2nd place, silver medalist(s)
Abderrahim Zhiou	Marathon T12	—N/a				2:26:56	3rd place, bronze medalist(s)

Men's field

Athlete	Event	Final		
Athlete	Event	Result	Points	Rank
Mohamed Amara	Javelin throw F40	35.58	—N/a	9
Mohamed Amara	Shot put F40	9.99	—N/a	11
Mohamed Farhat Chida	Long jump F37-38	6.36	1010	4
Dali Fatnassi	Shot put F20	11.99	—N/a	10
Mourad Idoudi	Javelin throw F33-34	18.32	—N/a	12
Mourad Idoudi	Shot put F32-33	7.65	664	10
Mohamed Krid	Discus throw F32-33-34	41.79	1004	4
Mohamed Krid	Javelin throw F33-34	33.59	—N/a	8
Mohamed Krid	Shot put F34	10.55	—N/a	10
Sofyane Mejri	Discus throw F40	38.07	—N/a	5
Sofyane Mejri	Shot put F40	11.07	—N/a	6
Hamdi Ouerfelli	Discus throw F37-38	45.02	972	5
Hamdi Ouerfelli	Shot put F37-38	13.74	—N/a	7
Faouzi Rzig	Javelin throw F33-34	35.86	—N/a	5
Mohamed Zemzemi	Club throw F31/32/51	24.63	933	6
Mohamed Zemzemi	Discus throw F51-52-53	11.34	917	3rd place, bronze medalist(s)

Women's track

Athlete	Event	Heats		Semifinal		Final	
Athlete	Event	Result	Rank	Result	Rank	Result	Rank
Neda Bahi	100m T37	14.53 PB	3 Q	—N/a		14.36	3rd place, bronze medalist(s)
Neda Bahi	200m T37	30.00	4 q	—N/a		30.28	7
Neda Bahi	400m T37	1:07.49 PB	1 Q	—N/a		1:05.86	1st place, gold medalist(s)
Yousra Ben Jemaa	100m T34	20.57	2 Q	—N/a		20.52	5
Yousra Ben Jemaa	200m T34	36.81	3 Q	—N/a		37.68	5
Somaya Bousaid	100m T13	13.41	4	did not advance			
Somaya Bousaid	400m T13	—N/a				56.83	2nd place, silver medalist(s)
Sonia Mansour	100m T38	14.40 SB	3 Q	—N/a		14.45	6
Sonia Mansour	200m T38	29.10 SB	3 Q	—N/a		29.32	6

Women's field

Athlete	Event	Final		
Athlete	Event	Result	Points	Rank
Hania Aidi	Javelin throw F54/55/56	17.40	—N/a	2nd place, silver medalist(s)
Hania Aidi	Shot put F54-56	6.30	904	5
Neda Bahi	Long jump F37/38	4.35	987	5
Yousra Ben Jemaa	Javelin throw F33/34/52/53	18.63	—N/a	4
Rabia Benhaj Ahmed	Long jump F20	NM		
Dhouha Chelhi	Club throw F31/32/51	8.29	468	13
Dhouha Chelhi	Discus throw F51/52/53	4.76	643	5
Maroua Ibrahmi	Club throw F31/32/51	23.43 WR	1064	1st place, gold medalist(s)
Maroua Ibrahmi	Shot put F32-34	5.75	869	3rd place, bronze medalist(s)
Fadhila Nafati	Shot put F54-56	6.21	888	7
Saida Nayli	Club throw F31/32/51	16.43	879	7
Bochra Rzouga	Discus throw F51/52/53	10.44	424	7
Raoua Tlili	Discus throw F40	31.16	—N/a	2nd place, silver medalist(s)
Raoua Tlili	Shot put F40	9.86 WR	—N/a	1st place, gold medalist(s)

== See also ==
- Tunisia at the Paralympics
- Tunisia at the 2012 Summer Olympics
