= Carleigh DeWald =

American Paralympic athlete

Personal information
- Born: Canby, Oregon, United States

Sport
- Country: United States
- Sport: Paralympic athletics
- Disability: Spastic diplegia
- Disability class: T34
Medal record
Paralympic athletics
Representing United States
Parapan American Games
Silver medal – second place	2011 Guadalajara	100m T34

Carleigh DeWald is an American former Paralympic athlete who competed at international track and field competitions. She is a Parapan American Games silver medalist and she competed at the 2012 Summer Paralympics.

DeWald was named High School Female Track Athlete of the Year in 2012 following her success at the Paralympics.
