= Liang Yongbin =

Chinese Paralympic athlete (born 1988)

Personal information
- Nationality: Chinese
- Born: 25 May 1988 (age 38) Changchun, China

Sport
- Country: China
- Sport: Athletics
- Disability class: T37
- Event: sprint
- Club: Jilin Province
- Coached by: Liu Hongjie
Medal record
Paralympic athletics
Representing China
Paralympic Games
Silver medal – second place	2012 London	100 m – T37

Liang Yongbin (born 25 May 1988) is a Paralympian athlete from China competing mainly in T37 classification sprint events. Liang represented his country at the 2012 Summer Paralympics in London where he won a silver medal in the men's 200m sprint. He has also competed at the IPC World Championships in 2015 but did not medal.
