= Athletics at the 2012 Summer Paralympics – Men's 400 metres =

The Men's 400m athletics events for the 2012 Summer Paralympics took place at the London Olympic Stadium from September 2 to September 8. A total of 10 events were contested over this distance for 10 different classifications.

== Schedule ==
R	Round 1	½	Semifinals	F	Final

Event↓/Date →	Fri 31	Sat 1	Sun 2		Mon 3		Tue 4		Wed 5	Thr 6	Fri 7		Sat 8
T11 400m										R	F		
T12 400m			R				½			F			
T13 400m	R		F										
T36 400m					R		F						
T38 400m			R		F								
T44 400m											R		F
T46 400m							R	F					
T52 400m					R	F							
T53 400m			R	F									
T54 400m									R		½	F	

== Results ==
=== T11 ===
The T11 category is for athletes with a visual impairment. A T11 athlete may be entirely without sight, or be able to perceive light, but have no ability to see the shape of a hand at any distance. T11 athletes commonly run with guides.

Final

Rank	Athlete	Country	Time	Notes
1st place, gold medalist(s)	José Sayovo Armando; Guide: Nicolau Palanca	Angola	50.75	PB
2nd place, silver medalist(s)	Lucas Prado; Guide: Laercio Alves Martins	Brazil	51.44	SB
3rd place, bronze medalist(s)	Gauthier Tresor Makunda; Guide: Antoine Laneyrie	France	52.45	
	Daniel Silva; Guide: Leonardo Souza Lopes	Brazil	DNS	

=== T12 ===
The T12 category is for athletes with visual impairment. Athletes in this category will generally have some residual sight, the ability to recognise the shape of a hand at a distance of 2 metres and the ability to perceive clearly will be no more than 2/60. T12 athletes commonly run with guides.

Final

Rank	Athlete	Country	Time	Notes
1st place, gold medalist(s)	Mahmoud Khaldi	Tunisia	48.52	WR
2nd place, silver medalist(s)	Hilton Langenhoven	South Africa	49.04	PB
3rd place, bronze medalist(s)	Jorge B. Gonzalez Sauceda	Mexico	50.41	PB
4	G. Desgarrega Puigdevall; Guide: Alejandro Guerrero Diaz	Spain	50.68	

=== T13 ===
The T13 category is for athletes with a moderate visual impairment. Athletes in this category have a variety of visual impairments, but can typically recognize contours from a distance of 2 to 6 metres. Athletes in this category do not typically require a guide.

Final

Rank	Athlete	Country	Time	Notes
1st place, gold medalist(s)	Alexey Labzin	Russia	48.59	PR
2nd place, silver medalist(s)	Alexander Zverev	Russia	48.83	PB
3rd place, bronze medalist(s)	Mohamed Amguoun	Morocco	49.45	
4	Ioannis Protos	Greece	49.67	SB
5	Hussein Kadhim	Iraq	49.76	RR
6	Djamil Nasser	Algeria	49.88	PB
7	Zine Eddine Sekhri	Algeria	51.16	PB
8	Markeith Price	United States	51.98	

=== T36 ===
The T36 category is for ambulant athletes with cerebral palsy. These athletes do not have the capacity to remain still and they show involuntary movements with all four limbs affected. They usually walk without assistive devices.

There were no heats in this event. The final was competed on 4 September 2012 at 20:45.

Final

Rank	Athlete	Country	Time	Notes
1st place, gold medalist(s)	Evgenii Shvetcov	Russia	53.31	WR
2nd place, silver medalist(s)	Paul Blake	Great Britain	54.22	PB
3rd place, bronze medalist(s)	Roman Pavlyk	Ukraine	55.18	PB
4	Che Mian	China	55.99	RR
5	Andrey Zhirnov	Russia	57.53	
6	Artem Arefyev	Russia	59.70	
7	Jose Manuel Gonzalez	Spain	01.51	
8	Gabriel De Jesus Cuadra Holman	Nicaragua	02.88	SB

=== T38 ===
The T38 category is for ambulant athletes with cerebral palsy. T38 athletes have the mildest form of impairment caused by cerebral palsy, often in only one limb, and not affecting the ability to run, walk or jump freely, although impairing performance. T38 athletes may suffer minor co-ordination difficulties.

Final

Rank	Athlete	Country	Class	Time	Notes
1st place, gold medalist(s)	Mohamed Farhat Chida	Tunisia	T38	50.43	SB
2nd place, silver medalist(s)	Zhou Wenjun	China	T38	51.56	RR
3rd place, bronze medalist(s)	Union Sekailwe	South Africa	T38	51.97	PB
4	Abbes Saidi	Tunisia	T38	52.05	PB
5	Tim Sullivan	Australia	T38	52.39	SB
6	Marius Stander	South Africa	T38	53.62	
7	Marcel Houssimoli	Vanuatu	T37	07.61	SB
	Omar Monterola	Venezuela	T37	DNF	

=== T44 ===
The T44 category is for athletes who have a single below knee amputation or who can walk with moderately reduced function in one or both legs.

Final

Competed 8 September 2012 at 21:57.

Rank	Athlete	Country	Class	Time	Notes
1st place, gold medalist(s)	Oscar Pistorius	South Africa	T43	46.68	PR
2nd place, silver medalist(s)	Blake Leeper	United States	T43	50.14	RR
3rd place, bronze medalist(s)	David Prince	United States	T44	50.61	WR
4	Alan Fonteles Cardoso Oliveira	Brazil	T43	51.59	PB
5	David Behre	Germany	T43	51.65	
6	Jarryd Wallace	United States	T44	53.90	
7	Ivan Prokopyev	Russia	T43	54.74	
8	Liu Zhiming	China	T44	55.91	

=== T46 ===
The T46 category is for athletes who have a single above or below elbow amputation or similar disability, with normal function in both legs.

Final

Competed 4 September 2012 at 20:54.

Rank	Athlete	Country	Class	Time	Notes
1st place, gold medalist(s)	Gunther Matzinger	Austria	T46	48.45	RR
2nd place, silver medalist(s)	Yohansson Nascimento	Brazil	T45	49.21	WR
3rd place, bronze medalist(s)	P Uggl Dena Pathirannehelag	Sri Lanka	T46	49.28	RR
4	Antonis Aresti	Cyprus	T46	49.59	SB
5	Hermas Muvunyi	Rwanda	T46	49.59	RR
6	Emicarlo Souza	Brazil	T46	50.74	
7	Xie Hexing	China	T46	1:01.80	
	Addoh Kimou	Ivory Coast	T46	DQ	

=== T52 ===
The T52 category is for wheelchair athletes with damage to spinal cord in the higher parts of the back, substantially impaired or no trunk function, and minimal or no leg function. Pushing power comes from elbow extensions, and appears close to normal except for use of modified gloves to compensate for grip.

Final

Competed 3 September 2012 at 19:48.

Rank	Athlete	Country	Time	Notes
1st place, gold medalist(s)	Raymond Martin	United States	58.54	
2nd place, silver medalist(s)	Tomoya Ito	Japan	1:00.40	SB
3rd place, bronze medalist(s)	Thomas Geierspichler	Austria	1:04.64	SB
4	Josh Roberts	United States	1:05.76	
5	Peth Rungsri	Thailand	1:06.46	SB
6	Beat Boesch	Switzerland	1:07.72	
7	Paul Nitz	United States	1:15.15	
	Hirokazu Ueyonabaru	Japan	DQ	

=== T53 ===
The T53 category is for wheelchair athletes with normal use of arms and hands, no or limited trunk function, and no leg function.

Final

Competed 2 September 2012 at 20:11.

Rank	Athlete	Country	Time	Notes
1st place, gold medalist(s)	Li Huzhao	China	49.70	SB
2nd place, silver medalist(s)	Brent Lakatos	Canada	50.17	
3rd place, bronze medalist(s)	Richard Colman	Australia	50.24	
4	Yu Shiran	China	50.92	PB
5	Joshua George	United States	51.14	
6	Yoo Byunghoon	South Korea	51.30	
7	Jung Dong Ho	South Korea	51.45	
8	Hamad N M E Aladwani	Kuwait	52.04	

=== T54 ===
The T54 category is for wheelchair athletes with no leg function, but near full arm function and reasonable to normal trunk function. Typically this may be caused by a lower spinal cord injury or spinal cord birth defect.

Final

Competed 7 September 2012 at 20:47.

Rank	Athlete	Country	Time	Notes
1st place, gold medalist(s)	Zhang Lixin	China	46.88	PB
2nd place, silver medalist(s)	Kenny van Weeghel	Netherlands	47.12	PB
3rd place, bronze medalist(s)	Liu Chengming	China	47.36	PB
4	Leo Pekka Tahti	Finland	47.68	PB
5	Marcel Hug	Switzerland	47.80	
6	Marc Schuh	Germany	48.42	
7	Cui Yanfeng	China	51.20	
	Saichon Konjen	Thailand	DQ	
