= Athletics at the 2012 Summer Paralympics – Men's 100 metres =

The Men's 100m athletics events for the 2012 Summer Paralympics took place at the London Olympic Stadium from 31 August to 8 September 2012. A total of 15 events were contested over this distance for 15 different classifications.

== Schedule ==
R	Round 1	½	Semifinals	F	Final

Event↓/Date →	Fri 31	Sat 1		Sun 2		Mon 3		Tue 4	Wed 5	Thr 6		Fri 7		Sat 8	
T11 100m												R		½	F
T12 100m						R	½	F							
T13 100m	R	F													
T34 100m														R	F
T35 100m	R	F													
T36 100m				R	F										
T37 100m														R	F
T38 100m		R	F												
T42 100m												R	F		
T44 100m									R	F					
T46 100m										R	F				
T51 100m						R	F								
T52 100m				R	F										
T53 100m						R	F								
T54 100m		R		½	F										

== Results ==
=== T11 ===
The T11 category is for athletes with a visual impairment. A T11 athlete may be entirely without sight, or be able to perceive light, but have no ability to see the shape of a hand at any distance. T11 athletes commonly run with guides.

Final

Rank	Name	Nationality	Time	Notes
1st place, gold medalist(s)	Xue Lei; Guide: Wang Lin	China	11.17	
2nd place, silver medalist(s)	Lucas Prado; Guide: Dos Santos Justino Barbosa	Brazil	11.25	
3rd place, bronze medalist(s)	Felipe Gomes; Guide: Leonardo Souza Lopes	Brazil	11.27	
4	José Sayovo Armando	Angola	11.36	
			Wind: -0.3 m/s	

=== T12 ===
The T12 category is for athletes with visual impairment. Athletes in this category will generally have some residual sight, the ability to recognise the shape of a hand at a distance of 2 metres and the ability to perceive clearly will be no more than 2/60. T12 athletes commonly run with guides.

Final

Rank	Name	Nationality	Time	Notes
1st place, gold medalist(s)	Fedor Trikolich	Russia	10.81	PB
2nd place, silver medalist(s)	Mateusz Michalski	Poland	10.88	
3rd place, bronze medalist(s)	Yansong Li	China	10.91	AS
4	Maximiliano Rodríguez	Spain	11.20	

=== T13 ===
The T13 category is for athletes with a moderate visual impairment. Athletes in this category have a variety of visual impairments, but can typically recognize contours from a distance of 2 to 6 metres. Athletes in this category do not typically require a guide.

Heats took place on 31 August 2012. Jason Smyth broke his own world record in 10.54, while Jonathan Ntutu broke the African record.

The final took place on 1 September 2012. Jason Smyth of Ireland won gold in a new world record time of 10.46. Luis Felipe Gutierrez took silver for his second medal of the Games, with the South African Ntutu just clinching bronze.

Final

Rank	Name	Nationality	Time	Notes
1st place, gold medalist(s)	Jason Smyth	Ireland	10.46	WR
2nd place, silver medalist(s)	Luis Felipe Gutierrez	Cuba	11.02	
3rd place, bronze medalist(s)	Jonathan Ntutu	South Africa	11.03	
4	Alexey Labzin	Russia	11.03	
5	Artem Loginov	Russia	11.18	
6	Radoslav Zlatanov	Bulgaria	11.25	
7	Braedon Samuel Dolfo	Canada	11.27	
8	André Andrade	Brazil	11.28	

=== T34 ===
The T34 category is for wheelchair athletes with cerebral palsy. Athletes in this category have minimal limitations or control problems in their arms and trunk while pushing a wheelchair.

Final

Rank	Athlete	Country	Time	Notes
1st place, gold medalist(s)	Walid Ktila	Tunisia	15.91	PR
2nd place, silver medalist(s)	Rheed McCracken	Australia	16.30	RR
3rd place, bronze medalist(s)	Mohamed Hammadi	United Arab Emirates	16.41	RR
4	Bojan Mitic	Switzerland	16.69	
5	Sebastien Mobre	France	16.73	
6	Stefan Rusch	Netherlands	16.74	PB
7	Henk Schuiling	Netherlands	17.32	
8	Nathan Dewitt	Canada	17.36	
			Wind: +0.1 m/s	

=== T35 ===
The T35 category is for ambulant athletes with cerebral palsy. The typical T35 athlete may need assistive devices for walking. The athlete may have sufficient function to run but demonstrates poor balance.

Final

Rank	Athlete	Country	Time	Notes
1st place, gold medalist(s)	Iurii Tsaruk	Ukraine	12.62	RR
2nd place, silver medalist(s)	Teboho Mokgalagadi	South Africa	13.10	
3rd place, bronze medalist(s)	Fu Xinhan	China	13.12	SB
4	Hernan Barreto	Argentina	13.26	
5	Allel Boukhalfa	Algeria	13.38	
6	Niels Stein	Germany	13.52	
7	Jordan Howe	Great Britain	13.69	
8	Anton Bubnov	Russia	13.89	
			Wind: -0.2 m/s	

=== T36 ===
The T36 category is for ambulant athletes with cerebral palsy. These athletes do not have the capacity to remain still and they show involuntary movements with all four limbs affected. They usually walk without assistive devices.

Final

Rank	Athlete	Country	Time	Notes
1st place, gold medalist(s)	Evgenii Shvetcov	Russia	12.08	PR
2nd place, silver medalist(s)	Graeme Ballard	Great Britain	12.24	
3rd place, bronze medalist(s)	Roman Pavlyk	Ukraine	12.26	=PB
4	So Wa Wai	Hong Kong	12.28	SB
5	Che Mian	China	12.31	=PB
6	Ben Rushgrove	Great Britain	12.37	
7	Xu Ran	China	12.74	SB
8	Marcin Mielczarek	Poland	12.80	
			Wind: +0.8 m/s	

=== T37 ===
The T37 category is for ambulant athletes with cerebral palsy. These athletes have movement and coordination problems on one half of their body. They have good ability in their dominant side of their body (ie hemiplegia).

Final

Rank	Athlete	Country	Time	Notes
1st place, gold medalist(s)	Fanie van der Merwe	South Africa	11.51	WR
2nd place, silver medalist(s)	Liang Yongbin	China	11.51	WR
3rd place, bronze medalist(s)	Roman Kapranov	Russia	11.56	RR
4	Shang Guangxu	China	11.63	=PB
5	Mostafa Fathalla Mohamed	Egypt	11.67	
6	Sofiane Hamdi	Algeria	11.80	
7	Gocha Khugaev	Russia	11.89	PB
8	Omar Monterola	Venezuela	DQ	
			Wind: +0.4 m/s	

=== T38 ===
Final

The T38 category is for ambulant athletes with cerebral palsy. T38 athletes have the mildest form of impairment caused by cerebral palsy, often in only one limb, and not affecting the ability to run, walk or jump freely, although impairing performance. T38 athletes may suffer minor co-ordination difficulties.

No heats were held.

The final was won in a new world record of 10.79 seconds by Evan O'Hanlon of Australia.

Rank	Name	Nationality	Time	Notes
1st place, gold medalist(s)	Evan O'Hanlon	Australia	10.79	WR
2nd place, silver medalist(s)	Dyan Buis	South Africa	11.11	AF
3rd place, bronze medalist(s)	Wenjun Zhou	China	11.22	AS
4	Mohamed Farhat Chida	Tunisia	11.44	
5	Edson Pinheiro	Brazil	11.57	
6	Lorenzo Albaladejo Martinez	Spain	11.79	
7	Mykyta Senyk	Ukraine	11.83	
8	Patrik Wurm	Czech Republic	11.98	
9	Haider Ali	Pakistan	15.89	

=== T42 ===
The T42 category is for single above-knee amputees and athletes with other impairments that are comparable to a single above knee amputation, including athletes with loss of muscle power in the lower limbs.

Final

Rank	Athlete	Country	Time	Notes
1st place, gold medalist(s)	Heinrich Popow	Germany	12.40	RR
2nd place, silver medalist(s)	Scott Reardon	Australia	12.43	PB
3rd place, bronze medalist(s)	Wojtek Czyz	Germany	12.52	SB
4	Clavel Kayitaré	France	12.73	
5	Atsushi Yamamoto	Japan	12.92	
6	Richard Whitehead	Great Britain	12.99	
7	Shaquille Vance	United States	13.03	SB
DQ	Earle Connor	Canada	DQ	Admitted to drug use
			Wind: -0.1 m/s	

=== T44 ===
The T44 category is for athletes who have a single below knee amputation or who can walk with moderately reduced function in one or both legs.

Heats took place on 5 September 2012. In the final, Jonnie Peacock of the UK won the Gold with a time of 10.90 seconds, Richard Browne of the USA won the Silver with a time of 11.03 seconds and Arnu Fourie of the RSA won the Bronze with a time of 11.08.

Final

Rank	Athlete	Country	Time	Notes
1st place, gold medalist(s)	Jonnie Peacock	Great Britain	10.90	PR
2nd place, silver medalist(s)	Richard Browne	United States	11.03	PB
3rd place, bronze medalist(s)	Arnu Fourie	South Africa	11.08	RR
4	Oscar Pistorius	South Africa	11.17	SB
5	Blake Leeper	United States	11.21	
6	Jerome Singleton	United States	11.25	
7	Alan Fonteles Cardoso Oliveira	Brazil	11.33	SB
8	Liu Zhiming	China	11.97	
			Wind: nil	

=== T46 ===
The T46 category is for athletes who have a single above or below elbow amputation or similar disability, with normal function in both legs.

Final

Rank	Athlete	Country	Class	Time	Notes
1	Zhao Xu	China	T45	11.05	RR
2	Raciel Gonzalez Isidoria	Cuba	T46	11.08	
3	Ola Abidogun	Great Britain	T46	11.23	
4	Suwaibidu Galadima	Nigeria	T46	11.31	
5	Tomoki Tagawa	Japan	T46	11.32	
6	Frank Johnwill	Nigeria	T46	11.34	
7	Francis Kompaon	Papua New Guinea	T46	12.28	
8	Yohansson Nascimento	Brazil	T45	30.79	
			Wind: +0.2 m/s		

=== T51 ===
The T51 category is for wheelchair athletes having spinal cord injuries, with mild weakness in shoulders, limited ability in straightening elbows and wrist function, and no finger, trunk or leg function.

There were no heats for this event. The final was competed on 3 September 2012 at 19:10.

Final

Rank	Athlete	Country	Time	Notes
1st place, gold medalist(s)	Toni Piispanen	Finland	21.72	PR
2nd place, silver medalist(s)	Alvise de Vidi	Italy	22.60	
3rd place, bronze medalist(s)	Mohamed Berrahal	Algeria	22.97	RR
4	Edgar Cesareo Navarro Sanchez	Mexico	23.35	
5	Stephen Osborne	Great Britain	23.40	
6	Pieter du Preez	South Africa	24.21	
7	John McCarthy	Ireland	25.53	
8	Satoshi Inoue	Japan	26.11	
			Wind: Nil	

=== T52 ===
The T52 category is for wheelchair athletes with damage to spinal cord in the higher parts of the back, substantially impaired or no trunk function, and minimal or no leg function. Pushing power comes from elbow extensions, and appears close to normal except for use of modified gloves to compensate for grip.

Final

Rank	Athlete	Country	Time	Notes
1st place, gold medalist(s)	Raymond Martin	United States	17.02	
2nd place, silver medalist(s)	Salvador Hernandez Mondragon	Mexico	17.64	
3rd place, bronze medalist(s)	Paul Nitz	United States	17.99	
4	Beat Boesch	Switzerland	18.41	
5	Tomoya Ito	Japan	18.74	
6	Josh Roberts	United States	18.86	
7	Thomas Geierspichler	Austria	19.01	
8	Peth Rungsri	Thailand	19.05	
			Wind: +0.1 m/s	

=== T53 ===
The T53 category is for wheelchair athletes with normal use of arms and hands, no or limited trunk function, and no leg function.

Final

Rank	Athlete	Country	Time	Notes
1st place, gold medalist(s)	Mickey Bushell	Great Britain	14.75	PR
2nd place, silver medalist(s)	Zhao Yufei	China	15.09	PB
3rd place, bronze medalist(s)	Yu Shiran	China	15.20	
4	Ariosvaldo Fernandes Silva	Brazil	15.31	
5	Brent Lakatos	Canada	15.31	
6	Brian Siemann	United States	15.39	
7	Hamad N M E Aladwani	Kuwait	15.47	PB
8	Zach Abbott	United States	15.51	
			Wind: +0.2 m/s	

=== T54 ===
The T54 category is for wheelchair athletes with no leg function, but near full arm function and reasonable to normal trunk function. Typically this may be caused by a lower spinal cord injury or spinal cord birth defect.

Final

Rank	Athlete	Country	Time	Notes
1st place, gold medalist(s)	Leo-Pekka Tähti	Finland	13.79	
2nd place, silver medalist(s)	Liu Yang	China	13.92	
3rd place, bronze medalist(s)	Saichon Konjen	Thailand	14.10	=PB
4	Cui Yanfeng	China	14.11	
5	Marc Schuh	Germany	14.61	
6	Curtis Thom	Canada	14.74	
7	Supachai Koysub	Thailand	14.74	
8	Kenny van Weeghel	Netherlands	14.87	
			Wind: -0.1 m/s	
