= Athletics at the 2012 Summer Paralympics – Men's 1500 metres =

The Men's 1500m athletics events for the 2012 Summer Paralympics took place at the London Olympic Stadium from 31 August to 4 September. A total of six events were contested over this distance for six different classifications.

== Schedule ==
R	Round 1	½	Semifinals	F	Final

Event↓/Date →	Fri 31	Sat 1	Sun 2	Mon 3	Tue 4	
T11 1500m	R	½		F		
T13 1500m				R	F	
T20 1500m				R	F	
T37 1500m				F		
T46 1500m		R			F	
T54 1500m				R	½	F

== Results ==
=== T11 ===
The T11 category is for athletes with a visual impairment. A T11 athlete may be entirely without sight, or be able to perceive light, but have no ability to see the shape of a hand at any distance. T11 athletes commonly run with guides.

Final

Competed 3 September 2012 at 20:31.

Rank	Athlete	Country	Time	Notes
1st place, gold medalist(s)	Samwel Mushai Kimani; Guide: James Boit	Kenya	3:58.37	WR
2nd place, silver medalist(s)	Odair Santos; Guide: Carlos Antonio dos Santos	Brazil	4:03.66	RR
3rd place, bronze medalist(s)	Jason Joseph Dunkerley; Guide: Josh Karanja	Canada	4:07.56	PB
4	Cristian Valenzuela; Guide: Cristopher Guajardo	Chile	4:07.79	PB
5	William Sosa; Guide: Cesar Chavarro Dias	Colombia	4:13.53	PB
6	Mikael Andersen; Guide: Laust Bengtsen	Denmark	4:16.12	SB

=== T13 ===
The T13 category is for athletes with a moderate visual impairment. Athletes in this category have a variety of visual impairments, but can typically recognize contours from a distance of 2 to 6 metres. Athletes in this category do not typically require a guide.

Final

Competed 4 September 2012 at 19:16.

Rank	Athlete	Country	Class	Time	Notes
1st place, gold medalist(s)	Abderrahim Zhiou	Tunisia	T12	3:48.31	WR
2nd place, silver medalist(s)	David Korir	Kenya	T13	3:48.84	WR
3rd place, bronze medalist(s)	David Devine	Great Britain	T12	3:49.79	RR
4	Tarik Zalzouli	Morocco	T13	3:52.12	PB
5	Henry Kirwa	Kenya	T12	3:53.55	PB
6	Tim Prendergast	New Zealand	T13	3:53.60	PB
7	Łukasz Wietecki	Poland	T13	3:56.26	
8	Alexey Akhtyamov	Russia	T13	3:56.29	
9	Abdelillah Mame	Morocco	T13	3:56.29	
10	El Amin Chentouf	Morocco	T12	4:00.43	
11	Ignacio Avila	Spain	T12	4:04.83	
12	Egor Sharov	Russia	T12	4:10.83	

=== T20 ===
The T20 category is for athletes with intellectual impairment. T20 athletes have an IQ score of 75 or less.

There were no heats in this event. The final was competed on 4 September 2012 at 19:34.

Final

Competed 4 September 2012 at 19:34.

Rank	Athlete	Country	Time	Notes
1st place, gold medalist(s)	Peyman Nasiri Bazanjani	Iran	3:58.49	SB
2nd place, silver medalist(s)	Daniel Pek	Poland	3:59.45	PB
3rd place, bronze medalist(s)	Rafal Korc	Poland	3:59.53	PB
4	Andriy Goliney	Ukraine	4:00.21	PB
5	Viacheslav Khrustalev	Russia	4:01.99	
6	Stephen Morris	Great Britain	4:02.50	
7	Viktor Shcherbyna	Ukraine	4:04.77	
8	Jose Martinez Morote	Spain	4:04.85	PB
9	Yuya Kimura	Japan	4:10.85	SB
10	Kuniaki Ishii	Japan	4:13.35	
11	Michael Murray	United States	4:18.78	

=== T37 ===
The T37 category is for ambulant athletes with cerebral palsy. These athletes have movement and coordination problems on one half of their body. They have good ability in their dominant side of their body (ie hemiplegia).

There were no heats in this event. The final was competed on 3 September 2012 at 20:47.

Final

Competed 3 September 2012 at 20:47.

Rank	Athlete	Country	Time	Notes
1st place, gold medalist(s)	Michael McKillop	Ireland	4:08.11	PR
2nd place, silver medalist(s)	Brad Scott	Australia	4:14.47	SB
3rd place, bronze medalist(s)	Mohamed Charmi	Tunisia	4:14.90	RR
4	Madjid Djemai	Algeria	4:16.50	PB
5	Faycel Othmani	Tunisia	4:19.94	PB
6	Hafid Aharak	Morocco	4:21.47	PB
7	Dean Miller	Great Britain	4:21.57	
8	Djamel Mastouri	France	4:27.02	
9	Oleksandr Driha	Ukraine	4:27.48	PB
10	Khaled Hanani	Algeria	4:29.23	

=== T46 ===
The T46 category is for athletes who have a single above or below elbow amputation or similar disability, with normal function in both legs.

Final

Competed 4 September 2012 at 20:24.

Rank	Athlete	Country	Time	Notes
1st place, gold medalist(s)	Abraham Tarbei	Kenya	3:50.15	WR
2nd place, silver medalist(s)	Wondiye Fikre Indelbu	Ethiopia	3:50.87	PB
3rd place, bronze medalist(s)	Samir Nouioua	Algeria	3:51.80	PB
4	David Emong	Uganda	3:58.47	PB
5	Mohamed Fouzai	Tunisia	3:58.79	SB
6	Matthew Silcocks	Australia	3:59.79	PB
7	Jonah Kipkemoi Chesum	Kenya	4:00.38	
8	Cahit Kilicaslan	Turkey	4:00.77	PB
9	Chris Hammer	United States	4:01.76	
10	Davide Dalla Palma	Italy	4:02.26	PB
11	Stanley Cheruiyot	Kenya	4:02.54	

=== T54 ===
The T54 category is for wheelchair athletes with no leg function, but near full arm function and reasonable to normal trunk function. Typically this may be caused by a lower spinal cord injury or spinal cord birth defect.

Final

|-

Rank	Athlete	Country	Time	Notes
1st place, gold medalist(s)	David Weir	Great Britain	3:12.09	
2nd place, silver medalist(s)	Prawat Wahoram	Thailand	3:12.32	
3rd place, bronze medalist(s)	Kim Gyu Dae	South Korea	3:12.57	
4	Marcel Hug	Switzerland	3:12.76	
5	Saichon Konjen	Thailand	3:12.84	
6	Liu Chengming	China	3:12.86	
7	Kurt Fearnley	Australia	3:13.23	
8	Liu Yang	China	3:13.63	
9	Zhang Lixin	China	3:14.05	
10	Josh Cassidy	Canada	3:14.70	
