= Athletics at the 2012 Summer Paralympics – Men's discus throw =

The Men's Discus Throw athletics events for the 2012 Summer Paralympics took place at the London Olympic Stadium from August 31 to September 7. A total of 10 events were contested incorporating 13 different classifications.

== Schedule ==
There were no heats. However, in each event after the first three throws, the top eight had 3 extra throws.

Event↓/Date →	Fri 31	Sat 1	Sun 2	Mon 3	Tue 4	Wed 5	Thr 6	Fri 7
F11 Discus Throw			F					
F32–34 Discus Throw								F
F35–36 Discus Throw				F				
F37–38 Discus Throw								F
F40 Discus Throw					F			
F42 Discus Throw			F					
F44 Discus Throw							F	
F51–52–53 Discus Throw							F	
F54–55–56 Discus Throw						F		
F57–58 Discus Throw	F							

== Results ==
PR = Paralympic record; RR = Regional record; PB = Personal best; SB = Season best; NM = No mark; DNS = Did not start.

=== F11 ===
Rank	Athlete	Nationality	1	2	3	4	5	6	Best	Notes
1st place, gold medalist(s)	David Casino	Spain	31.17	36.83	38.41	38.00	x	x	38.41	SB
2nd place, silver medalist(s)	Vasyl Lishchynskyi	Ukraine	x	35.66	x	34.24	x	x	35.66	
3rd place, bronze medalist(s)	Bil Marinkovic	Austria	32.30	34.36	33.84	34.59	x	32.79	34.59	
4	Sebastian Baldassarri	Argentina	x	x	32.72	31.18	x	34.03	34.03	
5	Edwin Rodriguez Gonzales	Colombia	x	x	33.39	x	x	31.93	33.39	
6	Sergio Paz	Argentina	31.32	x	32.44	31.41	31.99	31.82	32.44	
7	Luciano dos Santos Pereira	Brazil	29.14	x	8.25	29.31	x	x	29.31	
8	Nelson Goncalves	Portugal	25.66	27.29	27.13	27.62	29.04	x	29.04	
9	Alfonso Olivero Encarnacion	Dominican Republic	23.18	25.63	27.08	-	-	-	27.08	
10	Hameed Hassain	Iraq	26.65	24.43	26.56	-	-	-	26.65	SB
11	Ronald Carlos Greene	Trinidad and Tobago	x	x	26.28	-	-	-	26.28	
	Isaac Leiva	Guatemala	x	x	x	-	-	-	NM	

=== F32–33–34 ===
Rank	Athlete	Nationality	Class	1	2	3	4	5	6	Best	Score	Notes
1st place, gold medalist(s)	Wang Yanzhang	China	F34	42.57	46.21	43.48	43.30	49.03	36.64	49.03	1166	WR
2nd place, silver medalist(s)	Hani Alnakhli	Saudi Arabia	F33	30.55	32.61	32.51	31.69	34.65	33.64	34.65	1113	WR
3rd place, bronze medalist(s)	Lahouari Bahlaz	Algeria	F32	21.34	21.71	20.34	21.45	22.30	5.82	22.30	1081	WR
4	Mohamed Ali Krid	Tunisia	F34	30.69	41.79	x	37.82	x	x	41.79	1004	RR
5	Frantisek Serbus	Czech Republic	F32	19.28	x	20.64	x	x	x	20.64	999	RR
6	Abdulrahman Abdulqadir Abdulrahman	Qatar	F34	x	40.15	x	34.78	37.37	37.11	40.15	960	SB
7	Miloslav Bardiovsky	Slovakia	F32	19.83	x	19.02	6.54	x	18.93	19.83	956	SB
8	Alexander El'min	Russia	F34	39.47	39.34	39.74	38.35	39.25	39.85	39.85	952	RR
9	Jalal Khakzadiyeh	Iran	F34	36.71	38.22	39.29	-	-	-	39.29	936	
10	Kieran Tscherniawsky	Great Britain	F33	28.16	28.59	29.05	-	-	-	29.05	925	RR
11	Thierry Cibone	France	F34	36.31	38.22	x	-	-	-	38.22	906	SB
12	Mauricio Valencia	Colombia	F34	x	x	36.50	-	-	-	36.50	855	
13	Slaven Hudina	Croatia	F32	15.47	17.04	17.09	-	-	-	17.09	791	
14	Kamel Kardjena	Algeria	F33	x	25.50	x	-	-	-	25.50	780	
15	Adderin Majurin	Malaysia	F33	x	24.26	x	-	-	-	24.26	726	
16	Mohammad Almehairi	United Arab Emirates	F34	31.58	x	x	-	-	-	31.58	696	
17	Ahmed Alhousani	United Arab Emirates	F33	x	22.37	22.75	-	-	-	22.75	658	
18	Raymond O Dwyer	Ireland	F34	x	29.27	30.34	-	-	-	30.34	654	
19	Mohamed Al Nabhani	Oman	F33	19.18	19.50	20.94	-	-	-	20.94	574	PB
	Karim Betina	Algeria	F32	x	x	x	-	-	-	-	NM	

=== F35–36 ===
Rank	Athlete	Nationality	Class	1	2	3	4	5	6	Best	Notes
1st place, gold medalist(s)	Sebastian Dietz	Germany	F36	37.79	37.38	38.54	36.01	33.30	33.68	38.54	
2nd place, silver medalist(s)	Oleksii Pashkov	Ukraine	F36	33.15	x	37.89	37.80	31.89	36.56	37.89	PB
3rd place, bronze medalist(s)	Wenbo Wang	China	F36	34.36	37.66	37.87	35.82	37.61	34.55	37.87	SB
4	Pawel Piotrowski	Poland	F36	36.58	37.29	x	37.59	31.00	x	37.59	
5	Volodymyr Zhaivoronok	Ukraine	F36	x	37.34	x	33.91	35.76	x	37.34	SB
6	Reginald Benade	Namibia	F36	29.90	32.50	36.76	x	37.28	x	37.28	SB
7	Albin Vidovic	Croatia	F36	x	36.20	x	31.43	32.16	x	36.20	
8	Duane Strydom	South Africa	F36	34.44	x	35.64	35.02	x	34.48	35.64	
9	Paulo Souza	Brazil	F36	31.59	32.86	x	-	-	-	32.86	
10	Pompilio Falconi-Alvarez	Peru	F36	29.10	29.80	31.08	-	-	-	31.08	SB
11	Norberto M. Zertuche Rodriguez	Mexico	F36	6.81	29.95	x	-	-	-	29.95	

=== F37–38 ===
Rank	Athlete	Nationality	Class	1	2	3	4	5	6	Best	Score	Notes
1st place, gold medalist(s)	Javad Hardani	Iran	F38	51.51	48.31	52.46	52.91	47.32	-	52.91	1024	WR
2nd place, silver medalist(s)	Dong Xia	China	F37	51.34	53.71	55.81	x	51.55	x	55.81	1017	WR
3rd place, bronze medalist(s)	Tomasz Blatkiewicz	Poland	F37	45.49	50.84	51.12	50.05	54.02	50.31	54.02	1008	RR
4	Khusniddin Norbekov	Uzbekistan	F37	x	48.92	50.27	52.05	51.54	x	52.05	997	PB
5	Mohamed Mohamed Ramadan	Egypt	F37	49.95	49.90	51.49	51.92	49.27	47.44	51.92	996	RR
6	Hamdi Ouerfelli	Tunisia	F38	42.24	45.02	44.24	43.99	43.99	44.48	45.02	972	RR
7	Oleksandr Doroshenko	Ukraine	F38	39.56	44.49	43.25	39.95	44.58	x	44.58	968	=RR
8	Ibrahim Ahmed Abdelwareth	Egypt	F38	37.41	42.94	x	x	x	x	42.94	950	PB
9	Mindaugas Bilius	Lithuania	F37	x	33.17	43.29	-	-	-	43.29	909	
10	Ronni Jensen	Denmark	F37	41.21	42.51	41.47	-	-	-	42.51	898	
11	Ahmed Meshaima	Bahamas	F37	x	40.21	x	-	-	-	40.21	859	SB
12	Timo Mustikkamaa	Finland	F37	x	39.98	x	-	-	-	39.98	855	SB
13	Mykola Zhabnyak	Ukraine	F37	x	x	39.30	-	-	-	39.30	842	
-	Dusan Grezl	Czech Republic	F38	-	-	-	-	-	-	-	DNS	

=== F40 ===
Rank	Athlete	Nationality	1	2	3	4	5	6	Best	Notes
1st place, gold medalist(s)	Wang Zhiming	China	36.34	45.78	38.32	45.15	41.65	37.91	45.78	WR
2nd place, silver medalist(s)	Paschalis Stathelakos	Greece	36.45	37.56	32.64	42.08	x	44.11	44.11	RR
3rd place, bronze medalist(s)	Jonathan De Souza Santos	Brazil	39.53	40.49	39.58	40.00	40.37	x	40.49	
4	Bartosz Tyszkowski	Poland	26.04	35.11	39.20	38.72	x	32.91	39.20	
5	Sofyane Mejri	Tunisia	36.86	38.07	36.27	37.36	x	35.47	38.07	RR
6	Alexandros Michail Konstantinidis	Greece	32.60	37.59	x	36.69	37.04	35.14	37.59	SB
7	Scott Danberg	United States	33.78	32.25	31.01	33.46	31.92	x	33.78	SB
8	Chengcheng Fan	China	32.81	33.07	30.86	31.62	32.93	33.19	33.19	SB
9	Rachid Rachad	Morocco	32.26	30.22	29.33	-	-	-	32.26	PB
10	Hocine Gherzouli	Algeria	x	29.57	30.89	-	-	-	30.89	PB
11	Wildan Nukhailawi	Iraq	27.67	x	28.24	-	-	-	28.24	SB
12	Kovan Abdulraheem	Iraq	26.25	x	27.28	-	-	-	27.28	

=== F42 ===
Rank	Athlete	Nationality	1	2	3	4	5	6	Best	Notes
1st place, gold medalist(s)	Aled Davies	Great Britain	45.31	42.33	45.37	42.40	41.68	46.14	46.14	RR
2nd place, silver medalist(s)	Mehrdad Karamzadeh	Iran	43.73	x	42.86	43.23	44.62	44.37	44.62	PB
3rd place, bronze medalist(s)	Wang Lezheng	China	38.45	40.88	40.38	42.81	41.50	x	42.81	PB
4	Marinos Fylachtos	Greece	38.31	39.59	41.63	41.00	40.50	40.14	41.63	PB
5	Guofeng Kang	China	39.04	40.14	40.46	39.65	40.07	40.77	40.77	PB
6	Gino de Keersmaeker	Belgium	x	39.12	39.61	39.81	39.81	40.17	40.17	SB
7	Jaideep Jaideep	India	6.78	38.20	37.77	39.77	39.23	38.43	39.77	
8	Bassam Bassam Sawsan	Syria	36.85	x	32.78	37.27	31.40	32.32	37.27	
9	Fu Yanlong	China	x	x	36.54	-	-	-	36.54	SB
	Dechko Ovcharov	Bulgaria	x	x	x	-	-	-	NM	

=== F44 ===
Rank	Athlete	Nationality	1	2	3	4	5	6	Best	Notes
1st place, gold medalist(s)	Jeremy Campbell	United States	x	56.15	x	60.05	x	59.39	60.05	PR
2nd place, silver medalist(s)	Dan Greaves	Great Britain	53.75	56.29	59.01	x	57.67	55.58	59.01	SB
3rd place, bronze medalist(s)	Farzad Sepahvand	Iran	53.69	56.73	54.33	x	56.16	58.39	58.39	RR
4	Adrian Matusik	Slovakia	51.41	53.94	52.55	x	x	x	53.94	PB
5	Josip Slivar	Croatia	x	43.57	x	46.70	41.77	45.51	46.70	PB
6	Marco Aurélio Borges	Brazil	44.87	x	42.80	x	45.52	42.86	45.52	
7	Alexander Filatov	Russia	43.73	44.81	43.88	44.36	45.16	x	45.16	SB
8	Aloalo Ki Eneio Liku	Tonga	x	31.08	29.94	30.78	28.08	32.73	32.73	SB

=== F51–52-53 ===
Rank	Athlete	Nationality	Class	1	2	3	4	5	6	Best	Score	Notes
1st place, gold medalist(s)	Mohamed Berrahal	Algeria	F51	12.18	10.99	12.37	5.01	x	x	12.37	1093	WR
2nd place, silver medalist(s)	Aigars Apinis	Latvia	F52	19.97	20.73	19.92	21.00	20.98	20.17	21.00	1010	WR
3rd place, bronze medalist(s)	Mohamed Zemzemi	Tunisia	F51	x	x	10.93	9.78	11.00	11.34	11.34	917	PB
4	Alphanso Cunningham	Jamaica	F53	23.96	24.19	24.68	23.41	x	24.62	24.68	835	SB
5	Joze Flere	Slovenia	F51	x	10.42	x	9.83	x	x	10.42	761	
6	Martin Zvolanek	Czech Republic	F51	9.47	9.80	10.34	8.92	9.96	x	10.34	748	SB
7	Pantelis Kalogeros	Greece	F51	9.50	9.93	9.51	x	10.06	9.61	10.06	702	PB
8	Amit Kumar Kumar	India	F51	9.80	9.34	9.62	8.96	9.72	9.89	9.89	674	
9	Scot Severn	United States	F53	21.49	22.01	21.78	-	-	-	22.01	641	
10	Toshie Oi	Japan	F53	20.35	19.75	20.28	-	-	-	20.35	528	
-	Nikolaos Kaplanis	Greece	F51	x	x	x	-	-	-	-	NM	
-	Miroslav Matic	Croatia	F51	x	x	x	-	-	-	-	NM	

=== F54–56 ===
Rank	Athlete	Nationality	Class	1	2	3	4	5	6	Best	Score	Notes
1st place, gold medalist(s)	Leonardo Diaz	Cuba	F56	44.24	x	43.94	44.63	44.39	44.36	44.63	1019	WR
2nd place, silver medalist(s)	Draženko Mitrović	Serbia	F54	32.93	32.90	32.97	29.34	31.68	31.74	32.97	1012	WR
3rd place, bronze medalist(s)	Ali Mohammad Yari	Iran	F56	40.73	39.17	39.56	6.07	38.69	41.98	41.98	978	SB
4	Olokhan Musayev	Azerbaijan	F56	39.44	40.90	41.77	37.04	39.40	34.18	41.77	974	PB
5	Tanto Campbell	Jamaica	F56	35.99	41.66	40.93	39.38	41.07	40.91	41.66	972	PB
6	Martin Němec	Czech Republic	F55	34.07	33.17	35.92	34.68	33.69	34.81	35.92	934	SB
7	Fan Liang	China	F54	28.52	27.68	x	27.67	18.30	29.02	29.02	919	SB
8	Mustafa Yuseinov	Bulgaria	F55	28.86	32.56	31.67	31.06	32.19	32.21	32.56	849	
9	Ibrahim Ibrahim	Egypt	F56	x	35.32	x	x	x	x	35.32	834	RR
10	Ilias Nalmpantis	Greece	F55	29.42	30.86	31.37	-	-	-	31.37	814	PB
11	Ruzhdi Ruzhdi	Bulgaria	F55	30.29	30.27	30.47	-	-	-	30.47	786	
12	Khamis Zaqout	Palestine	F55	20.87	23.65	29.41	-	-	-	29.41	751	
13	Cong Luan Trinh	Vietnam	F56	26.76	x	x	-	-	-	26.76	551	

=== F57–58 ===
Rank	Athlete	Nationality	Class	1	2	3	4	5	6	Best	Score	Notes
1st place, gold medalist(s)	Alexey Ashapatov	Russia	F58	56.19	53.27	x	55.34	54.65	60.72	60.72	1043	WR
2nd place, silver medalist(s)	Rostislav Pohlmann	Czech Republic	F57	41.47	44.77	46.87	44.42	43.30	46.89	46.89	951	PB
3rd place, bronze medalist(s)	Metawa Abouelkhir	Egypt	F58	54.19	x	x	x	51.83	51.26	54.19	944	SB
4	Claudiney Santos	Brazil	F57	41.25	45.90	45.85	x	35.82	44.51	45.90	931	RR
5	Samir Nabiyev	Azerbaijan	F57	44.66	44.78	44.62	43.87	x	41.76	41.76	906	PB
6	Zhang Yang	China	F58	x	51.24	x	51.50	x	x	51.50	894	
7	Issa Saif Hamdan Al Jahwari	United Arab Emirates	F57	41.16	39.01	42.87	40.20	41.20	42.67	42.87	862	
8	Fernando del Rosario Gonzalez	Mexico	F58	47.83	47.82	49.38	43.59	41.29	46.29	49.38	851	
9	Ali Ghardooni	Germany	F57	40.79	38.59	x	-	-	-	40.79	810	SB
10	Dennis Ogbe	United States	F58	47.15	40.99	454.41	-	-	-	47.15	802	
11	Derek Derenalagi	Great Britain	F57	38.16	27.65	39.37	-	-	-	39.37	771	
12	Fernando Mina Cortes	Colombia	F58	x	41.94	x	-	-	-	41.94	673	
13	Vanderson Alves da Silva	Brazil	F57	33.55	35.81	x	-	-	-	35.81	667	
14	Amer Ali Mustafa Al Abbadi	Jordan	F58	x	x	41.32	-	-	-	41.32	657	
15	Zaharani Selemani Mwenemti	Tanzania	F58	39.07	39.41	39.17	-	-	-	39.41	605	
16	Levy Kitambala Kizito	Democratic Republic of the Congo	F58	x	27.23	x	-	-	-	27.23	265	PB
	Ngoc Hung Cao	Vietnam	F58	x	x	x	-	-	-	-	NM	
	Nathan Stephens	Great Britain	F57								DNS	
