= Athletics at the 2004 Summer Paralympics – Women's 100 metres T11–13 =

Women's 100m races for blind & visually impaired athletes at the 2004 Summer Paralympics were held in the Athens Olympic Stadium. Events were held in three disability classes.

== T11 ==
Women's 100m T11 at the XII Paralympic Games
- Venue: Athens Olympic Stadium
- Dates: 19–20 September 2004
- Competitors: 12 from 10 nations
- Winning time: 12.55

Medalists
1st place, gold medalist(s)		Ádria Santos	Brazil
2nd place, silver medalist(s)		Wu Chun Miao	China
3rd place, bronze medalist(s)		Paraskevi Kantza	Greece

The T11 event consisted of 3 heats, 2 semifinals and A & B finals. It was won by Ádria Santos, representing Brazil.

=== 1st Round ===
Qualified for next round

Heat 1

19 Sept. 2004, 18:45

Rank	Athlete	Time	Notes
1	Elena Frolova (RUS)	12.80	Q
2	Wu Chun Miao (CHN)	12.98	Q
3	Paraskevi Kantza (GRE)	13.33	q
4	Estefania Pascoal (ANG)	14.39	

Heat 2

19 Sept. 2004, 18:51

Rank	Athlete	Time	Notes
1	Ádria Santos (BRA)	12.48	Q
2	Maren Bossmeyer (GER)	13.80	Q
3	Sigita Markeviciene (LTU)	13.99	
4	Lilian Suazo (HON)	20.40	

Heat 3

19 Sept. 2004, 18:57

Rank	Athlete	Time	Notes
1	Purificacion Santamarta (ESP)	13.54	Q
2	Simone Silva (BRA)	13.66	Q
3	Wu Jing (CHN)	13.82	q
4	Amina Bibi (PAK)	24.23	

=== Semifinals ===
Heat 1

20 Sept. 2004, 11:20

Rank	Athlete	Time	Notes
1	Ádria Santos (BRA)	12.95	Q
2	Wu Chun Miao (CHN)	13.20	q
3	Paraskevi Kantza (GRE)	13.32	q
4	Maren Bossmeyer (GER)	14.26	

Heat 2

20 Sept. 2004, 11:26

Rank	Athlete	Time	Notes
1	Purificacion Santamarta (ESP)	13.29	Q
2	Simone Silva (BRA)	13.69	
3	Wu Jing (CHN)	18.32	
	Elena Frolova (RUS)	DSQ	

=== Final Round ===
Final A

20 Sept. 2004, 18:55

Rank	Athlete	Time	Notes
1st place, gold medalist(s)	Ádria Santos (BRA)	12.55	
2nd place, silver medalist(s)	Wu Chun Miao (CHN)	12.94	
3rd place, bronze medalist(s)	Paraskevi Kantza (GRE)	13.34	
4	Purificacion Santamarta (ESP)	13.49	

Final B

20 Sept. 2004, 18:45

Rank	Athlete	Time	Notes
1	Maren Bossmeyer (GER)	14.52	
2	Wu Jing (CHN)	15.43	
	Simone Silva (BRA)	DNS	

== T12 ==
Women's 100m T12 at the XII Paralympic Games
- Venue: Athens Olympic Stadium
- Dates: 22–24 September 2004
- Competitors: 16 from 10 nations
- Winning time: 12.32

Medalists
1st place, gold medalist(s)		Assia El Hannouni	France
2nd place, silver medalist(s)		Volha Zinkevich	Belarus
3rd place, bronze medalist(s)		Maria José Alves	Brazil

The T12 event consisted of 5 heats, 3 semifinals and A & B finals. It was won by Assia El Hannouni, representing France.

=== 1st Round ===
Qualified for next round

Heat 1

22 Sept. 2004, 11:55

Rank	Athlete	Time	Notes
1	Assia El Hannouni (FRA)	13.01	Q
2	Annalena Knors (GER)	13.49	Q
3	Sara Martinez (ESP)	13.85	q

Heat 2

22 Sept. 2004, 12:01

Rank	Athlete	Time	Notes
1	Liu Miao Miao (CHN)	13.76	Q
2	Hanna Kaniuk (BLR)	13.92	Q
3	Nelly Munialo (KEN)	14.54	

Heat 3

22 Sept. 2004, 12:07

Rank	Athlete	Time	Notes
1	Volha Zinkevich (BLR)	12.60	WR Q
2	Sirlene Guilhermino (BRA)	13.13	Q
3	Marija Ivekovic (CRO)	13.38	q

Heat 4

22 Sept. 2004, 12:13

Rank	Athlete	Time	Notes
1	Maria José Alves (BRA)	12.71	Q
2	Elena Congost (ESP)	13.45	Q
3	Yang Bing (CHN)	14.11	
4	Irene Acen (UGA)	15.68	

Heat 5

22 Sept. 2004, 12:19

Rank	Athlete	Time	Notes
1	Elena Jdanova (RUS)	13.11	Q
2	Eva Ngui (ESP)	13.17	Q
3	Sun Xin (CHN)	14.41	

=== Semifinals ===
Heat 1

23 Sept. 2004, 11:00

Rank	Athlete	Time	Notes
1	Volha Zinkevich (BLR)	12.88	Q
2	Sirlene Guilhermino (BRA)	13.24	
	Hanna Kaniuk (BLR)	DNF	
	Eva Ngui (ESP)	DNS	

Heat 2

23 Sept. 2004, 11:06

Rank	Athlete	Time	Notes
1	Maria José Alves (BRA)	12.67	Q
2	Marija Ivekovic (CRO)	13.27	
3	Elena Congost (ESP)	13.39	
4	Liu Miao Miao (CHN)	13.71	

Heat 3

23 Sept. 2004, 11:12

Rank	Athlete	Time	Notes
1	Assia El Hannouni (FRA)	12.99	Q
2	Elena Jdanova (RUS)	13.12	q
3	Annalena Knors (GER)	13.48	
4	Sara Martinez (ESP)	13.85	

=== Final Round ===
Final A

24 Sept. 2004, 18:46

Rank	Athlete	Time	Notes
1st place, gold medalist(s)	Assia El Hannouni (FRA)	12.32	WR
2nd place, silver medalist(s)	Volha Zinkevich (BLR)	12.46	
3rd place, bronze medalist(s)	Maria José Alves (BRA)	12.70	
4	Elena Jdanova (RUS)	13.01	

Final B

24 Sept. 2004, 18:40

Rank	Athlete	Time	Notes
1	Sirlene Guilhermino (BRA)	13.37	
2	Marija Ivekovic (CRO)	13.38	
3	Elena Congost (ESP)	13.43	
4	Annalena Knors (GER)	13.49	

== T13 ==
Women's 100m T13 at the XII Paralympic Games
- Venue: Athens Olympic Stadium
- Dates: 20 September 2004
- Competitors: 8 from 8 nations
- Winning time: 12.56

Medalists
1st place, gold medalist(s)		Olga Semenova	Russia
2nd place, silver medalist(s)		Anthi Karagianni	Greece
3rd place, bronze medalist(s)		Ana I. Jimenez	Cuba

The T13 event consisted of a single race. It was won by Olga Semenova, representing Russia.

=== Final Round ===
20 Sept. 2004, 18:30

Rank	Athlete	Time	Notes
1st place, gold medalist(s)	Olga Semenova (RUS)	12.56	
2nd place, silver medalist(s)	Anthi Karagianni (GRE)	12.87	
3rd place, bronze medalist(s)	Ana I. Jimenez (CUB)	12.98	
4	Katrin Mueller (GER)	13.17	
5	Ilse Hayes (RSA)	13.23	
6	Aksana Sivitskaya (BLR)	13.56	
7	Lara Hollow (AUS)	13.79	
8	Svitlana Gorbenko (UKR)	14.10	
