= Athletics at the 2004 Summer Paralympics – Women's 400 metres T12–13 =

Women's 100m races for blind & visually impaired athletes at the 2004 Summer Paralympics were held in the Athens Olympic Stadium. Events were held in two disability classes.

== T12 ==
Women's 400m T12 at the XII Paralympic Games
- Venue: Athens Olympic Stadium
- Dates: 25–27 September 2004
- Competitors: 14 from 10 nations
- Winning time: 53.67

Medalists
1st place, gold medalist(s)		Assia El Hannouni	France
2nd place, silver medalist(s)		Ádria Santos	Brazil
3rd place, bronze medalist(s)		Terezinha Guilhermina	Brazil

The T12 event consisted of 4 heats, 2 semifinals and A & B finals. It was won by Assia El Hannouni, representing France.

=== 1st Round ===
Qualified for next round

Heat 1

25 Sept. 2004, 22:00

Rank	Athlete	Time	Notes
1	Ádria Santos (BRA)	59.63	Q
2	Dashzevg Sanduidemchig (MGL)	1:17.20	
	Wu Chun Miao (CHN)	DNS	

Heat 2

25 Sept. 2004, 22:07

Rank	Athlete	Time	Notes
1	Volha Zinkevich (BLR)	1:02.12	Q
2	Sandra Barrero (ESP)	1:02.14	q
3	Katarzyna Kwiatkowska (POL)	1:04.40	q

Heat 3

25 Sept. 2004, 22:14

Rank	Athlete	Time	Notes
1	Tracey Hinton (GBR)	1:01.38	Q
2	Purificacion Santamarta (ESP)	1:06.09	
3	Julia Longorkaye (KEN)	1:07.66	
	Maria José Alves (BRA)	DNS	

Heat 4

25 Sept. 2004, 22:21

Rank	Athlete	Time	Notes
1	Assia El Hannouni (FRA)	56.15	WR Q
2	Terezinha Guilhermina (BRA)	58.23	q
3	Elena Jdanova (RUS)	1:00.27	q
4	Nelly Munialo (KEN)	1:05.69	

=== Semifinals ===
Heat 1

26 Sept. 2004, 19:10

Rank	Athlete	Time	Notes
1	Assia El Hannouni (FRA)	57.15	Q
2	Terezinha Guilhermina (BRA)	58.11	q
3	Volha Zinkevich (BLR)	58.65	q
4	Katarzyna Kwiatkowska (POL)	1:03.68	

Heat 2

26 Sept. 2004, 19:17

Rank	Athlete	Time	Notes
1	Ádria Santos (BRA)	58.17	Q
2	Elena Jdanova (RUS)	58.88	
3	Tracey Hinton (GBR)	1:00.25	
4	Sandra Barrero (ESP)	1:02.63	

=== Final Round ===
Final A

27 Sept. 2004, 18:00

Rank	Athlete	Time	Notes
1st place, gold medalist(s)	Assia El Hannouni (FRA)	53.67	WR
2nd place, silver medalist(s)	Ádria Santos (BRA)	57.46	
3rd place, bronze medalist(s)	Terezinha Guilhermina (BRA)	57.52	
4	Volha Zinkevich (BLR)	1:00.04	

Final B

27 Sept. 2004, 17:55

Rank	Athlete	Time	Notes
1	Elena Jdanova (RUS)	1:01.24	
2	Katarzyna Kwiatkowska (POL)	1:04.21	
	Sandra Barrero (ESP)	DNS	
	Tracey Hinton (GBR)	DNS	

== T13 ==
Women's 400m T13 at the XII Paralympic Games
- Venue: Athens Olympic Stadium
- Dates: 27 September 2004
- Competitors: 8 from 8 nations
- Winning time: 57.79

Medalists
1st place, gold medalist(s)		Olga Semenova	Russia
2nd place, silver medalist(s)		Anthi Karagianni	Greece
3rd place, bronze medalist(s)		Ilse Hayes	South Africa

The T13 event consisted of a single race. It was won by Olga Semenova, representing Russia.

=== Final Round ===
27 Sept. 2004, 18:20

Rank	Athlete	Time	Notes
1st place, gold medalist(s)	Olga Semenova (RUS)	57.79	
2nd place, silver medalist(s)	Anthi Karagianni (GRE)	1:00.13	
3rd place, bronze medalist(s)	Ilse Hayes (RSA)	1:00.17	
4	Katrin Mueller (GER)	1:00.43	
5	Lara Hollow (AUS)	1:03.65	
6	Catherine Walsh (IRL)	1:05.99	
7	Julia Palacios (MEX)	1:06.74	
8	M. Mohamed Zaimoonisah (SIN)	1:07.47	
