= 2012 IPC Athletics European Championships – Women's long jump =

The women's long jump at the 2012 IPC Athletics European Championships was held at Stadskanaal Stadium from 24–28 July.

== Medalists ==
Results given by IPC Athletics.

Class	Gold	Silver	Bronze
F11	Paraskevi Kantza; Greece	Viktoria Karlsson; Sweden	Ronja Oja; Finland
F12	Anna Kaniuk; Belarus	Volha Zinkevich; Belarus	Sara Martinez; Spain
F13	Anthi Karagianni; Greece	Iulia Korunchak; Ukraine	Janne Sophie Engeleiter; Germany
F20	Karolina Kucharczyk; Poland	Krestina Zhukova; Russia	Mikela Ristoski; Croatia
F37	Marta Langner; Poland	Maike Hausberger; Germany	Matthildur Thorsteinsdottir; Iceland
F38	Inna Stryzhak; Ukraine	Margarita Goncharova; Russia	Ramunė Adomaitienė; Lithuania
F42/44/46	Suzan Verduijn; Netherlands	Nikol Rodomakina; Russia	Martina Caironi; Italy

== Results ==
=== F11 ===
Rank	Athlete	1	2	3	4	5	6	Best	Notes
1st place, gold medalist(s)	Paraskevi Kantza; Greece	3.97	3.80	X	X	4.01	4.13	4.13	SB
2nd place, silver medalist(s)	Viktoria Karlsson; Sweden	X	4.08	X	3.86	X	3.94	4.08	SB
3rd place, bronze medalist(s)	Ronja Oja; Finland	3.75	3.83	3.78	3.80	3.67	3.83	3.83	SB
4	Elisa Montonen; Finland	3.76	3.70	3.78	X	3.72	3.66	3.78	

=== F12 ===
Rank	Athlete	1	2	3	4	5	6	Best	Notes
1st place, gold medalist(s)	Anna Kaniuk; Belarus	5.70	5.80	5.75	5.83	X	X	5.83	SB
2nd place, silver medalist(s)	Volha Zinkevich; Belarus	5.29	5.28	5.54	5.36	5.42	5.43	5.54	SB
3rd place, bronze medalist(s)	Sara Martinez; Spain	5.42	5.43	5.48	5.42	5.22	5.21	5.48	SB
4	Katrin Mueller-Rottgardt; Germany	5.20	5.02	5.27	5.27	5.13	5.13	5.27	SB
5	Melani Berges Gamez; Spain	4.91	5.01	4.72	4.95	4.72	4.68	5.01	SB
6	Gluosne Norkute; Lithuania	4.69	4.87	4.85	4.88	4.79	4.81	4.88	
7	Natalija Eder; Austria	4.68	4.77	4.64	4.50	X	X	4.77	

=== F13 ===
Rank	Athlete	1	2	3	4	5	6	Best	Notes
1st place, gold medalist(s)	Anthi Karagianni; Greece	4.61	4.04	4.85	4.85	4.69	4.96	4.96	
2nd place, silver medalist(s)	Iulia Korunchak; Ukraine	4.89	4.65	4.50	3.85	4.62	4.68	4.89	
3rd place, bronze medalist(s)	Janne Sophie Engeleiter; Germany	4.43	4.20	4.34	4.33	4.29	X	4.43	

=== F20 ===
Rank	Athlete	1	2	3	4	5	6	Best	Notes
1st place, gold medalist(s)	Karolina Kucharczyk; Poland	5.50	X	5.70	5.61	5.88	5.76	5.88	PB
2nd place, silver medalist(s)	Krestina Zhukova; Russia	5.32	5.39	5.41	5.44	5.38	5.25	5.44	SB
3rd place, bronze medalist(s)	Mikela Ristoski; Croatia	X	5.29	5.09	X	4.91	5.26	5.29	
4	Olena Marunych; Ukraine	4.93	4.85	4.75	4.70	4.42	4.60	4.93	
5	Emma Eriksson; Sweden	4.36	4.52	4.55	4.78	4.51	4.66	4.78	
6	Stephanie Ydstrom; Sweden	4.40	4.59	4.38	4.50	X	4.27	4.59	
7	Raquel Cerqueira; Portugal	4.36	4.51	4.52	4.43	4.46	4.50	4.52	
8	Veronika Skuhrovska; Czech Republic	4.07	4.37	4.20	4.25	4.26	4.14	4.37	
9	Virginie Dreux; France	X	4.12	3.98				4.12	SB

=== F37 ===
Rank	Athlete	1	2	3	4	5	6	Best	Notes
1st place, gold medalist(s)	Marta Langner; Poland	4.17	4.27	4.27	4.11	3.98	X	4.27	
2nd place, silver medalist(s)	Maike Hausberger; Germany	X	X	3.90	4.03	X	3.94	4.03	SB
3rd place, bronze medalist(s)	Matthildur Thorsteinsdottir; Iceland	X	X	3.88	3.62	X	3.85	3.88	
4	Natalia Jasinska; Poland	X	3.72	3.67	3.70	3.80	X	3.80	
5	Liene Grutzite; Latvia	3.30	3.54	3.31	3.39	3.42	3.34	3.54	

=== F38 ===
Rank	Athlete	1	2	3	4	5	6	Best	Notes
1st place, gold medalist(s)	Inna Stryzhak; Ukraine	4.78	4.47	X	X	4.81	4.96	4.96	WR
2nd place, silver medalist(s)	Margarita Goncharova; Russia	4.52	X	4.67	4.34	4.58	4.72	4.72	SB
3rd place, bronze medalist(s)	Ramunė Adomaitienė; Lithuania	4.48	4.57	4.63	X	4.53	4.55	4.63	
4	Maria Fernandes; Portugal	X	4.03	X	X	X	4.16	4.16	SB

=== F42/44/46 ===
Rank	Athlete	1	2	3	4	5	6	Best	Points	Notes
1st place, gold medalist(s)	Suzan Verduijn; Netherlands	4.66	X	4.56	4.20	4.65	4.81	4.81	966	
2nd place, silver medalist(s)	Nikol Rodomakina; Russia	5.32	5.39	5.47	5.39	5.43	5.27	5.47	956	
3rd place, bronze medalist(s)	Martina Caironi; Italy	3.43	1.78	3.44	3.72	3.80	3.82	3.82	944	SB
4	Marije Smits; Netherlands	X	3.54	3.63	X	3.56	3.74	3.74	925	SB
5	Iris Pruysen; Netherlands	X	4.46	X	X	X	X	4.46	896	
6	Annette Roozen; Netherlands	X	3.17	3.35	3.59	3.43	3.52	3.59	881	
7	Ewa Zielinska; Poland	3.28	3.31	3.37	3.32	1.69	2.85	3.37	796	
8	Lenka Gajarska; Slovakia	4.35	4.70	4.68	X	4.43	4.61	4.70	724	

== See also ==
- List of IPC world records in athletics
