= El Salvador at the Paralympics =

- IPC code: ESA
- NPC: Comité Paralímpico de El Salvador
- Medals Ranked 123rd: Gold 0 Silver 0 Bronze 1 Total 1

Summer appearances
- 2000; 2004; 2008; 2012; 2016; 2020; 2024

El Salvador first competed in the Paralympic Games at the 2000 Summer Paralympics in Sydney, Australia. It has participated in the Summer Paralympic Games every four years since that time. El Salvador will be participating at the Winter Paralympics for the first time at the 2026 Winter Paralympics in Italy and before that, it had never taken part in the Winter Paralympics. The country will be represented by two competitors in para cross-country skiing. Until Tokyo 2020, no Salvadorian had won a Paralympic medal. In 2021, Herbert Aceituno became the first athlete to win a medal, earning bronze in powerlifting at the 59 kg category.

Six athletes from El Salvador have represented their nation at the Paralympic Games, five in the sport category of athletics, which is largely track and field competitions, and one in powerlifting. Wheelchair sprinter Claudia Marina Palacios, the sole Salvadorean competitor in 2000, was the first to represent El Salvador at the Paralympics. Two athletes were sent to the Paralympics in 2004, and one each to the games in 2008, 2012, and 2016.

== Medal tables ==
=== Medals by Summer Games ===
| Games | Athletes | Gold | Silver | Bronze | Total | Rank |
| (Australia) 2000 Sydney | 1 | 0 | 0 | 0 | 0 | – |
| (Greece) 2004 Athens | 2 | 0 | 0 | 0 | 0 | – |
| (China) 2008 Beijing | 1 | 0 | 0 | 0 | 0 | – |
| (United Kingdom) 2012 London | 1 | 0 | 0 | 0 | 0 | – |
| (Brazil) 2016 Rio | 1 | 0 | 0 | 0 | 0 | – |
| (Japan) 2020 Tokyo | 3 | 0 | 0 | 1 | 1 | 78 |
| (France) 2024 Paris | 3 | 0 | 0 | 0 | 0 | – |
| Total | | 0 | 0 | 1 | 1 | |

=== Medals by Summer sport ===
| Games | Gold | Silver | Bronze | Total |
|---|---|---|---|---|
| Powerlifting | 0 | 0 | 1 | 1 |
| Total | 0 | 0 | 1 | 1 |

=== Medals by Winter Games ===
| Games | Athletes | Gold medal | Silver medal | Bronze medal | Total | Rank |
|---|---|---|---|---|---|---|
| (Sweden) 1976 Örnsköldsvik | did not participate | | | | | |
| (Norway) 1980 Geilo | did not participate | | | | | |
| (Austria) 1984 Innsbruck | did not participate | | | | | |
| (Austria) 1988 Innsbruck | did not participate | | | | | |
| (France) 1992 Tignes - Albertville | did not participate | | | | | |
| (Norway) 1994 Lillehammer | did not participate | | | | | |
| (Japan) 1998 Nagano | did not participate | | | | | |
| (United States) 2002 Salt Lake City | did not participate | | | | | |
| (Italy) 2006 Turin | did not participate | | | | | |
| (Canada) 2010 Vancouver | did not participate | | | | | |
| (Russia) 2014 Sochi | did not participate | | | | | |
| (South Korea) 2018 Pyeongchang | did not participate | | | | | |
| (China) 2022 Beijing | did not participate | | | | | |
| (Italy) 2026 Milan-Cortina | 2 | - | - | - | - | |
| Total | 2 | 0 | 0 | 0 | 0 | 0 |

== Summer Paralympic Games ==
=== 2000 Sydney ===
El Salvador sent one athlete to the 2000 Summer Paralympics in Sydney, Australia, in their first appearance at the Paralympics. Wheelchair sprinter Claudia Marina Palacios competed in the women's 400 metre race in the T54 category, finishing fourth in her semifinal heat and not advancing to the final.

=== 2004 Athens ===
Two athletes were sent to represent El Salvador at the 2004 Summer Paralympics in Athens, Greece. Marleny Chauez competed in the women's 200 metre race in the T54 category, finishing fifth in her heat and not advancing to the final. William Rivas competed in the men's 100 metres (T54), finishing seventh in his first-round heat and not advancing to the semifinal round. Rivas qualified for the men's marathon (T54), but did not start the race.

=== 2008 Beijing ===
El Salvador's sole representative at the 2008 Summer Paralympics in Beijing, China, was sprinter Zulma Cruz. She competed in the women's 100 metres (T13) and 200 metres (T13). She finished sixth in her first-round heats in both events and did not advance to the finals.

=== 2012 London ===
The only Salvadorian athlete sent to represent his nation at the 2012 Summer Paralympics in London, United Kingdom, was wheelchair sprinter Luis Hector Morales Garcia. He competed in the men's 100 metres (T54), finishing seventh in his first-round heat and not advancing to the final round.

=== 2016 Rio ===
In 2016, El Salvador once more sent one individual to represent their nation at the 2016 Summer Paralympics in Rio, Brazil. This was Herbert Aceituno who competed in the powerlifting competition, men's - 72 KG. Herbert did not medal in the competition, ultimately won by Lei Liu of China.

=== 2020 Tokyo ===
In 2021, Herbert Aceituno won the first ever medal for El Salvador at the Paralympics. He won the bronze medal in the powerlifting men's 59 kg event.

== See also ==
- El Salvador at the Olympics
