= Athletics at the 2008 Summer Paralympics – Women's 100 metres T12 =

Event at the 2008 Summer Paralympics

Women's 100m T12 at the XIII Paralympic Games
- Dates: 8–9 September 2008
- Competitors: 20 from 15 nations
- Winning time: 12.38

Medalists
1st place, gold medalist(s)		Oxana Boturchuk	Ukraine
2nd place, silver medalist(s)		Libby Clegg	Great Britain
3rd place, bronze medalist(s)		Eva Ngui	Spain

The Women's 100m T12 had its first round held on September 8, beginning at 11:17. The Semifinals were held on September 8, at 18:15 and the A and B Finals were held on September 9 at 11:25.

== Results ==
Place	Athlete	Round 1	Semifinals	Final B	Final A
1	Oxana Boturchuk (UKR)	12.42 Q	12.43 Q	—	12.38
2	Libby Clegg (GBR)	12.71 Q	12.69 Q	—	12.51
3	Eva Ngui (ESP)	12.56 q	12.55 Q	—	12.58
4	Volha Zinkevich (BLR)	12.81 Q	12.67 Q	—	12.71
5	Hana Kolníková (SVK)	13.08 q	12.87 q	12.87	
6	Sirlene Guilhermino (BRA)	12.95 Q	12.88 q	12.95	
7	Tatiana del Carmen de Tovar (VEN)	12.95 Q	12.89 q	12.99	
8	Daineris Mijan (CUB)	12.93 Q	12.99 q	13.05	
9	Alaa Jasim Al-Qaysi (IRQ)	13.12 q	13.03		
10	Maria Jose Alves (BRA)	13.36 q	13.21		
11	Ana Tercia Soares (BRA)	13.20 q	13.24		
12	Rosalia Lazaro (ESP)	13.40 q	13.28		
13	Sara Martinez (ESP)	13.80			
13	Tanja Dragic (SRB)	13.80			
15	Svetlana Makeyeva (KAZ)	13.86			
16	Rodastina Ivanova (BUL)	14.86			
17	Thato Mohasoa (LES)	15.95			
	Evalina Alexandre (ANG)	DSQ			
	Joyleen Jeffrey (PNG)	DSQ			
	Anna Kaniouk (BLR)	DSQ			
