= Athletics at the 2008 Summer Paralympics – Women's 200 metres T12 =

The Women's 200m T12 had its first round held on September 15, beginning at 10:00. The Semifinals were held on September 16, at 9:41 and the A and B Finals were held on September 16 at 17:05.

== Medalists ==
| Gold | Assia El'Hannouni; France |
| Silver | Oxana Boturchuk; Ukraine |
| Bronze | Eva Ngui; Spain |

== Results ==
| Place | Athlete | Round 1 | Semifinals | Final A |
|---|---|---|---|---|
| 1 | Assia El'Hannouni (FRA) | 25.58 Q | 25.27 Q | 24.84 WR |
| 2 | Oxana Boturchuk (UKR) | 25.30 Q | 25.34 Q | 25.03 |
| 3 | Eva Ngui (ESP) | 25.69 Q | 25.87 q | 25.70 |
| 4 | Evalina Alexandre (ANG) | 26.31 q | 25.72 q | DSQ |
| 5 | Volha Zinkevich (BLR) | 26.17 Q | 26.07 | |
| 6 | Libby Clegg (GBR) | 26.432 q | 26.16 | |
| 7 | Hana Kolníková (SVK) | 26.25 q | 26.45 | |
| 8 | Sirlene Guilhermino (BRA) | 26.57 q | 26.91 | |
| 9 | Xin Sun (CHN) | 26.65 | | |
| 10 | Ana Tercia Soares (BRA) | 26.95 | | |
| 11 | Maria Jose Alves (BRA) | 27.16 | | |
| 12 | Analena Knors (GER) | 27.89 | | |
| 13 | Svetlana Makeyeva (KAZ) | 28.14 | | |
| | Tanja Dragic (SRB) | DNF | | |
| | Alaa Jasim Al-Qaysi (IRQ) | DNS | | |
| | Daineris Mijan (CUB) | DNS | | |
