= Athletics at the 2004 Summer Paralympics – Women's 200 metres T11–12 =

Women's 200m races for blind & visually impaired athletes at the 2004 Summer Paralympics were held in the Athens Olympic Stadium. Events were held in two disability classes.

== T11 ==
Women's 200m T11 at the XII Paralympic Games
- Venue: Athens Olympic Stadium
- Dates: 22–24 September 2004
- Competitors: 12 from 10 nations
- Winning time: 25.39

Medalists
1st place, gold medalist(s)		Wu Chun Miao	China
2nd place, silver medalist(s)		Ádria Santos	Brazil
3rd place, bronze medalist(s)		Purificacion Santamarta	Spain

The T11 event consisted of 3 heats, 2 semifinals and A & B finals. It was won by Wu Chun Miao, representing China.

=== 1st Round ===
Qualified for next round

Heat 1

22 Sept. 2004, 11:30

Rank	Athlete	Time	Notes
1	Ádria Santos (BRA)	26.82	Q
2	Paraskevi Kantza (GRE)	28.57	Q
3	Estefania Pascoal (ANG)	30.44	q
	Wu Jing (CHN)	DNS	

Heat 2

22 Sept. 2004, 11:36

Rank	Athlete	Time	Notes
1	Purificacion Santamarta (ESP)	27.62	Q
2	Simone Silva (BRA)	28.11	Q
3	Sigita Markeviciene (LTU)	28.98	q
4	Dashzevg Sanduidemchig (MGL)	34.82	

Heat 3

22 Sept. 2004, 11:42

Rank	Athlete	Time	Notes
1	Wu Chun Miao (CHN)	26.87	Q
2	Maren Bossmeyer (GER)	29.70	Q
3	Elena Frolova (RUS)	31.07	
	Amina Bibi (PAK)	DNS	

=== Semifinals ===
Heat 1

23 Sept. 2004, 10:40

Rank	Athlete	Time	Notes
1	Ádria Santos (BRA)	26.59	Q
2	Paraskevi Kantza (GRE)	27.48	q
3	Simone Silva (BRA)	27.87	
4	Estefania Pascoal (ANG)	30.26	

Heat 2

23 Sept. 2004, 10:46

Rank	Athlete	Time	Notes
1	Wu Chun Miao (CHN)	26.59	Q
2	Purificacion Santamarta (ESP)	27.32	q
3	Sigita Markeviciene (LTU)	29.80	
4	Maren Bossmeyer (GER)	30.45	

=== Final Round ===
Final A

24 Sept. 2004, 17:20

Rank	Athlete	Time	Notes
1st place, gold medalist(s)	Wu Chun Miao (CHN)	25.39	
2nd place, silver medalist(s)	Ádria Santos (BRA)	25.60	
3rd place, bronze medalist(s)	Purificacion Santamarta (ESP)	26.71	
4	Paraskevi Kantza (GRE)	27.29	

Final B

24 Sept. 2004, 17:10

Rank	Athlete	Time	Notes
1	Simone Silva (BRA)	27.59	
2	Sigita Markeviciene (LTU)	28.70	
3	Maren Bossmeyer (GER)	30.03	
4	Estefania Pascoal (ANG)	30.28	

== T12 ==
Women's 200m T12 at the XII Paralympic Games
- Venue: Athens Olympic Stadium
- Dates: 19–20 September 2004
- Competitors: 15 from 10 nations
- Winning time: 25.12

Medalists
1st place, gold medalist(s)		Assia El Hannouni	France
2nd place, silver medalist(s)		Volha Zinkevich	Belarus
3rd place, bronze medalist(s)		Maria José Alves	Brazil

The T12 event consisted of 4 heats, 2 semifinals and A & B finals. It was won by Assia El Hannouni, representing France.

=== 1st Round ===
Qualified for next round

Heat 1

19 Sept. 2004, 17:45

Rank	Athlete	Time	Notes
1	Assia El Hannouni (FRA)	24.99	WR Q
2	Annalena Knors (GER)	27.42	q
3	Elena Congost (ESP)	28.20	q

Heat 2

19 Sept. 2004, 17:51

Rank	Athlete	Time	Notes
1	Elena Jdanova (RUS)	28.72	Q
2	Nelly Munialo (KEN)	29.22	
3	Sun Xin (CHN)	29.68	
4	Irene Acen (UGA)	32.42	

Heat 3

19 Sept. 2004, 17:57

Rank	Athlete	Time	Notes
1	Volha Zinkevich (BLR)	25.65	Q
2	Sirlene Guilhermino (BRA)	27.45	q
3	Katarzyna Kwiatkowska (POL)	28.14	q
4	Yang Bing (CHN)	29.39	

Heat 4

19 Sept. 2004, 18:03

Rank	Athlete	Time	Notes
1	Maria José Alves (BRA)	25.83	Q
2	Liu Miao Miao (CHN)	28.25	
3	Maria Martinez (ESP)	28.47	
	Hanna Kaniuk (BLR)	DNF	

=== Semifinals ===
Heat 1

20 Sept. 2004, 11:45

Rank	Athlete	Time	Notes
1	Assia El Hannouni (FRA)	25.53	Q
2	Elena Jdanova (RUS)	26.12	q
3	Annalena Knors (GER)	27.35	
4	Sirlene Guilhermino (BRA)	27.59	

Heat 2

20 Sept. 2004, 11:51

Rank	Athlete	Time	Notes
1	Volha Zinkevich (BLR)	25.57	Q
2	Maria José Alves (BRA)	25.73	q
3	Elena Congost (ESP)	28.19	
4	Katarzyna Kwiatkowska (POL)	28.63	

=== Final Round ===
Final A

20 Sept. 2004, 18:20

Rank	Athlete	Time	Notes
1st place, gold medalist(s)	Assia El Hannouni (FRA)	25.12	
2nd place, silver medalist(s)	Volha Zinkevich (BLR)	25.87	
3rd place, bronze medalist(s)	Maria José Alves (BRA)	26.20	
4	Elena Jdanova (RUS)	26.82	

Final B

20 Sept. 2004, 18:10

Rank	Athlete	Time	Notes
1	Sirlene Guilhermino (BRA)	27.62	
2	Annalena Knors (GER)	27.63	
3	Elena Congost (ESP)	28.50	
4	Katarzyna Kwiatkowska (POL)	28.64	
