= Athletics at the 2008 Summer Paralympics – Women's 200 metres T11 =

The Women's 200m T11 had its first round held on September 15, beginning at 11:26 and the A and B Finals were held on September 16 at 17:25.

== Medalists ==
Gold	Terezinha Guilhermina; Brazil
Silver	Wu Chunmiao; China
Bronze	Jerusa Santos; Brazil

== Results ==
Place	Athlete	Round 1	Final B	Final A
1	Terezinha Guilhermina (BRA)	25.16 Q	—	25.14
2	Wu Chunmiao (CHN)	25.59 Q	—	25.40
3	Jerusa Santos (BRA)	26.05 Q	—	26.09
4	Tracey Hinton (GBR)	26.58 Q	—	26.68
5	Paraskevi Kantza (GRE)	26.61 q	26.87	
6	Irene Suarez (VEN)	27.06 q	27.61	
7	Elena Frolova (RUS)	27.59 q	27.69	
8	Adria Santos (BRA)	27.37 q	28.15	
9	Miroslava Sedlackova (CZE)	28.47		
10	Gracia Sosa (ARG)	29.35		
	Alberlis Torres (VEN)	DSQ		
