= Athletics at the 2008 Summer Paralympics – Women's long jump F13 =

The women's long jump F13 had its final held on September 12, at 17:10.

== Medalists ==
Gold	Ilse Hayes; South Africa
Silver	Anthi Karagianni; Greece
Bronze	Svitlana Gorbenko; Ukraine

== Results ==
Place	Athlete	1	2	3	4	5	6	Best
1	Ilse Hayes (RSA)	5.43	5.17	5.62	5.68	5.34	5.66	5.68
2	Anthi Karagianni (GRE)	5.52	5.58	5.63	3.00	5.53	5.42	5.63
3	Svitlana Gorbenko (UKR)	5.47	5.54	5.55	5.62	5.27	5.59	5.62
4	Nantenin Keita (FRA)	5.17	4.86	5.36	5.38	5.12	5.49	5.49
5	Katrin Müller-Rottgardt (GER)	4.34	5.05	5.04	5.12	5.24	4.78	5.24
6	Aksana Sivitskaya (BLR)	5.05	5.22	5.06	4.99	5.06	x	5.22
7	Sanaa Benhama (MAR)	x	4.93	5.05	4.88	-	-	5.05
8	Yuliya Korunchak (UKR)	5.00	4.83	4.68	5.04	4.56	4.94	5.04
9	Uran Sawada (JPN)	x	4.93	x				4.93
10	Aleksandra Surkova (RUS)	4.64	4.56	4.57				4.64
11	Nathalie Nilsson (SWE)	4.43	4.33	4.39				4.43
12	Indayana Martins (BRA)	4.10	3.91	3.75				4.10
13	Maryna Chyshko (UKR)	x	x	4.09				4.09
14	Nadia Hafeez (PAK)	3.33	3.20	3.24				3.33
