= El Salvador at the 2020 Summer Paralympics =

- IPC code: ESA
- NPC: Comité Paralímpico de El Salvador

in Tokyo
- Competitors: 3 in 2 sports
- Flag bearer: Herbert Aceituno & Norma Salinas
- Medals Ranked 78th: Gold 0 Silver 0 Bronze 1 Total 1

Summer Paralympics appearances (overview)
- 2000; 2004; 2008; 2012; 2016; 2020; 2024

El Salvador sent a delegation to compete in the 2020 Summer Paralympics in Tokyo in Japan originally scheduled to take place in 2020 but postponed to 23 July to 8 August 2021 because of the COVID-19 pandemic. This was the country's sixth successive appearance in the Summer Paralympics since debuting at the 2000 Summer Paralympics.

== Medalists ==
| Medal | Name | Sport | Event | Date |
|---|---|---|---|---|
| Bronze | Herbert Aceituno | Powerlifting | Men's 59 kg | 27 August |

== Competitors ==
| Sport | Men | Women | Total |
|---|---|---|---|
| Athletics | 1 | 1 | 2 |
| Powerlifting | 1 | 0 | 1 |
| Total | 2 | 1 | 3 |

| Athlete | Event | Heats | | Final | |
| Athlete | Event | Result | Rank | Result | Rank |
|---|---|---|---|---|---|
| David Pleitez | Men's 100m T37 | 12.72 SB | 6 | DNA | 12 |
| David Pleitez | Men's 200m T37 | 26.10 SB | 7 | DNA | 13 |
| Norma Salinas | Women's 100m T37 | 16.70 SB | 6 | DNA | 12 |
| Norma Salinas | Women's 200m T38 | DNF | | | 11 |

== Powerlifting ==
| Athlete | Event | Total lifted | Rank |
|---|---|---|---|
| Herbert Aceituno | Men's -59 kg | 184 | Bronze medal |

== See also ==
- El Salvador at the 2020 Summer Olympics
