= Athletics at the 2008 Summer Paralympics – Women's 200 metres T13 =

The Women's 200m T13 had its competition held on September 13, with the first round at 9:45 and the Final at 18:45.

== Medalists ==
Gold	Sanaa Benhama; Morocco
Silver	Nantenin Keita; France
Bronze	Alexandra Dimoglou; Greece

== Results ==
Place	Athlete	Round 1	Final
1	Sanaa Benhama (MAR)	25.37 Q	24.89
2	Nantenin Keita (FRA)	25.98 Q	25.51
3	Alexandra Dimoglou (GRE)	26.08 Q	25.59
4	Omara Durand (CUB)	25.97 Q	25.67
5	Ilse Hayes (RSA)	26.46 Q	26.22
6	Maryna Chyshko (UKR)	26.57 Q	26.50
7	Joana Slva (BRA)	26.78 q	26.85
8	Tetiana Smyrnova (UKR)	26.65 q	26.93
9	Anthi Karagianni (GRE)	27.06	
10	Courtney Harbeck (AUS)	27.73	
11	Indayana Martins (BRA)	28.41	
12	Zulma Cruz (ESA)	32.65	
	Olga Semenova (RUS)	DNS	
