= El Salvador at the 2016 Summer Paralympics =

- IPC code: ESA
- NPC: Comité Paralímpico de El Salvador

in Rio de Janeiro
- Competitors: 1 in 1 sports
- Flag bearer: Herbert Aceituno (powerlifting)
- Medals: Gold 0 Silver 0 Bronze 0 Total 0

Summer Paralympics appearances (overview)
- 2000; 2004; 2008; 2012; 2016; 2020; 2024

El Salvador sent a delegation to compete in the 2016 Summer Paralympics in Rio de Janeiro in Brazil from 7 to 18 September 2016. This was the country's fifth successive appearance in the Summer Paralympics since debuting at the 2000 Summer Paralympics. The Salvadoran delegation to Rio consisted of one athlete, powerlifter Herbert Aceituno, who qualified for the Games through his world ranking of 13th and his participation was confirmed by the International Paralympic Committee in August 2016. He failed to lift 185 kilograms (408 lb) in three attempts during the men's 72 kg tournament and was therefore not ranked in the final standings by the judges.

== Background ==
El Salvador first appeared in Paralympic competition at the 2000 Summer Paralympics. The nation has entered every edition of the Summer Paralympics since, making Rio their fifth time competing in the quadrennial multi-sport competition, but has not yet appeared at the Winter Paralympics. At the close of the Rio Paralympics, El Salvador has not medalled at the Paralympic Games. The 2016 Summer Paralympics were held from 7–18 September 2016 with a total of 4,328 athletes representing 159 National Paralympic Committees taking part. Herbert Aceituno, a powerlifter, was the only athlete sent by El Salvador to Rio and his participation was confirmed by the International Paralympic Committee on 14 August 2016. He travelled with his coach Jorge López to Rio de Janeiro on 30 August. Aceituno was selected as the flag bearer for the parade of nations during the opening ceremony.

== Disability classifications ==
Every participant at the Paralympics has their disability grouped into one of five disability categories; amputation, the condition may be congenital or sustained through injury or illness; cerebral palsy; wheelchair athletes, there is often overlap between this and other categories; visual impairment, including blindness; Les autres, any physical disability that does not fall strictly under one of the other categories, for example dwarfism or multiple sclerosis. Each Paralympic sport then has its own classifications, dependent upon the specific physical demands of competition. Events are given a code, made of numbers and letters, describing the type of event and classification of the athletes competing. Some sports, such as athletics, divide athletes by both the category and severity of their disabilities, other sports, for example swimming, group competitors from different categories together, the only separation being based on the severity of the disability.

== Powerlifting ==
Computer technician Herbert Aceituno was 30 years old at the time of the Rio Summer Paralympics and he was making his debut in the Paralympic Games. His disability is congenital; he was born with the bone growth disorder achondroplasia that causes dwarfism. Aceituno automatically qualified for the Games because of his world ranking of 13th that he attained at a 2016 IPC Powerlifting World Cup event in Rio de Janeiro. This meant he became the first Salvadoran athlete to participate at the Paralympics through standard qualification procedures. He trained at Pavilion 5 of Riocentro to prepare for the Games. Before the Games, Aceituno said that he was excited to represent his country at the Paralympics and aimed to be within the top ten and improve his world ranking position. On 11 September, he participated in the men's 72 kg tournament. Aceituno ran out of time to lift 185 kilograms (408 lb) on his first try and he could not do so in his next two attempts. He therefore went unranked by the judges in the competition. (Note: Four other athletes failed to set a mark.)

| Athlete | Event | Body weight (kg) | Attempts (kg) | | | | Result (kg) | Place |
| Athlete | Event | Body weight (kg) | 1 | 2 | 3 | 4 | Result (kg) | Place |
|---|---|---|---|---|---|---|---|---|
| Herbert Aceituno | Men's −72 kg | 68.87 | ~~185~~ | ~~185~~ | ~~185~~ | – | NMR | – |

== See also ==
- El Salvador at the 2016 Summer Olympics
