= Athletics at the 2004 Summer Paralympics – Women's long jump F12–13 =

Women's long jump events for blind & visually impaired athletes were held at the 2004 Summer Paralympics in the Athens Olympic Stadium. Events were held in two disability classes.

== F12 ==
Women's Long Jump F12 at the XII Paralympic Games
- Venue: Athens Olympic Stadium
- Dates: 23 September 2004
- Competitors: 11 from 7 nations
- Winning distance: 5.66

Medalists
1st place, gold medalist(s)		Volha Zinkevich	Belarus
2nd place, silver medalist(s)		Rosalia Lazaro	Spain
3rd place, bronze medalist(s)		Hanna Kaniuk	Belarus

The F12 event was won by Volha Zinkevich, representing Belarus.

23 Sept. 2004, 20:00

Rank	Athlete	Result	Notes
1st place, gold medalist(s)	Volha Zinkevich (BLR)	5.66	WR
2nd place, silver medalist(s)	Rosalia Lazaro (ESP)	5.63	
3rd place, bronze medalist(s)	Hanna Kaniuk (BLR)	5.48	
4	Marija Iveković (CRO)	5.31	
5	Liu Miao Miao (CHN)	5.20	
6	Helena Kannus (EST)	5.03	
7	Sara Martinez (ESP)	4.93	
8	Yang Bing (CHN)	4.87	
9	Annalena Knors (GER)	4.77	
10	Maria Martinez (ESP)	4.67	
11	Sirlene Guilhermino (BRA)	3.75	

== F13 ==
Women's Long Jump F13 at the XII Paralympic Games
- Venue: Athens Olympic Stadium
- Dates: 25 September 2004
- Competitors: 6 from 6 nations
- Winning distance: 5.40

Medalists
1st place, gold medalist(s)		Ana I. Jimenez	Cuba
2nd place, silver medalist(s)		Anthi Karagianni	Greece
3rd place, bronze medalist(s)		Aksana Sivitskaya	Belarus

The F13 event was won by Ana I. Jimenez, representing Cuba.

25 Sept. 2004, 11:10

Rank	Athlete	Result	Notes
1st place, gold medalist(s)	Ana I. Jimenez (CUB)	5.40	
2nd place, silver medalist(s)	Anthi Karagianni (GRE)	5.29	
3rd place, bronze medalist(s)	Aksana Sivitskaya (BLR)	5.22	
4	Svitlana Gorbenko (UKR)	5.15	
5	Katrin Mueller (GER)	4.91	
6	Catherine Walsh (IRL)	4.55	
