= Athletics at the 2008 Summer Paralympics – Women's 400 metres T13 =

The Women's 400m T13 had its competition held on September 11, with the first round at 18:30 and the Final on September 12, at 20:26.

== Medalists ==
Gold	Sanaa Benhama; Morocco
Silver	Alexandra Dimoglou; Greece
Bronze	Nantenin Keita; France

== Results ==
Place	Athlete	Round 1	Final
1	Sanaa Benhama (MAR)	56.17 Q	55.56 PR
2	Alexandra Dimoglou (GRE)	57.16 Q	56.09
3	Nantenin Keita (FRA)	57.71 Q	56.28
4	Somaya Bousaid (TUN)	56.86 Q	56.72
5	Tetiana Smyrnova (UKR)	58.66 Q	1:00.06
6	Katrin Muller-Rottgardt (GER)	1:00.49 q	1:00.34
7	Joana Silva (BRA)	1:01.46 q	1:02.08
8	Omara Durand (CUB)	59.38 Q	DNF
9	Olga Semenova (RUS)	1:04.90	
10	Indayana Martins (BRA)	1:05.56	
