= Athletics at the 2016 Summer Paralympics – Women's 100 metres T13 =

Women's 100 metres T13 at the XV Paralympic Games
- Venue: Rio Olympic Stadium
- Dates: 10 and 11 September
- Competitors: 10

Medalists
1st place, gold medalist(s)		Leilia Adzhametova	Ukraine
2nd place, silver medalist(s)		Ilse Hayes	South Africa
3rd place, bronze medalist(s)		Kym Crosby	United States

The women's 100 metres T13 event at the 2016 Summer Paralympics took place at the Rio Olympic Stadium on 10 and 11 September. It featured 15 athletes from 11 countries.

The T13 category is for athletes with a moderate visual impairment. Athletes in this category have a variety of visual impairments, but typically can recognise contours from a distance of 2 to 6 metres. Athletes in this category do not typically require a guide.

== Heats ==
The heats were completed at 12:02 and 12:09 local time. Heat 1 (-1.1 m/s); Heat 2 (-1.0 m/s)

=== Heat 1 ===
Rank	Athlete	Country	Time	Notes
1	Leilia Adzhametova	Ukraine	11.86	WR, Q
2	Nantenin Keïta	France	12.35	PB, Q
3	Carolina Duarte	Portugal	12.53	PB, Q
4	Sanaa Benhama	Morocco	12.53	q
5	Laina Sithole	Zimbabwe	13.68	SB

=== Heat 2 ===
Rank	Athlete	Country	Time	Notes
1	Ilse Hayes	South Africa	12.34	Q
2	Kym Crosby	United States	12.49	Q
3	Olena Gliebova	Ukraine	12.55	SB, Q
4	Orla Comerford	(Republic of Ireland) Ireland	12.81	PB, q
5	Janne Sophie Engeleiter	Germany	13.13	

== Final ==
Rank	Athlete	Country	Time	Notes
1st place, gold medalist(s)	Leilia Adzhametova	Ukraine	11.79	WR
2nd place, silver medalist(s)	Ilse Hayes	South Africa	11.91	SB
3rd place, bronze medalist(s)	Kym Crosby	United States	12.24	PB
4	Olena Gliebova	Ukraine	12.28	PB
5	Nantenin Keïta	France	12.36	
6	Carolina Duarte	Portugal	12.48	PB
7	Sanaa Benhama	Morocco	12.49	
8	Orla Comerford	Ireland	12.87	
