= Athletics at the 2016 Summer Paralympics – Women's 400 metres T13 =

Women's 400 metres T13 at the XV Paralympic Games
- Venue: Estádio Olímpico João Havelange
- Dates: 17 September 2016
- Competitors: 8 from 7 nations

Medalists
1st place, gold medalist(s)		Nantenin Keita	France
2nd place, silver medalist(s)		Ilse Hayes	South Africa
3rd place, bronze medalist(s)		Leilia Adzhametova	Ukraine

The T13 category is for athletes with a moderate visual impairment. Athletes in this category have a variety of visual impairments, but can typically recognize contours from a distance of 2 to 6 metres. Athletes in this category do not typically require a guide.

The Athletics at the 2016 Summer Paralympics – Women's 400 metres T13 event at the 2016 Paralympic Games took place on 17 September 2016, at the Estádio Olímpico João Havelange.

== Final ==
10:44 17 September 2016:

Rank	Lane	Bib	Name	Nationality	Reaction	Time	Notes
1st place, gold medalist(s)	3	306	Nantenin Keita	France	0.159	55.78	
2nd place, silver medalist(s)	5	736	Ilse Hayes	South Africa	0.371	56.49	
3rd place, bronze medalist(s)	2	871	Leilia Adzhametova	Ukraine	0.394	56.60	
4	7	895	Kym Crosby	United States	0.170	57.26	
5	8	874	Olena Gliebova	Ukraine	0.275	57.59	
6	4	519	Sanaa Benhama	Morocco	0.145	58.40	
7	6	704	Carolina Duarte	Portugal	0.202	58.52	
8	1	832	Somaya Bousaid	Tunisia	0.242	1:03.98	
