= Athletics at the 2008 Summer Paralympics – Women's 100 metres T11 =

Women's 100m T11 at the XIII Paralympic Games
- Dates: 8–9 September 2008
- Competitors: 11 from 8 nations
- Winning time: 12.31

Medalists
1st place, gold medalist(s)		Ádria Santos	Brazil
2nd place, silver medalist(s)		Wu Chun Miao	China
3rd place, bronze medalist(s)		Paraskevi Kantza	Greece

The Women's 100m T11 had its first round held on September 8, beginning at 20:52 and the A and B Finals were held on September 9 at 11:48.

== Results ==
Place	Athlete	Round 1	Final B	Final A
1	Chunmiao Wu (CHN)	12.41 Q	—	12.31 PR
2	Terezinha Guilhermina (BRA)	12.48 Q	—	12.40
3	Adria Santos (BRA)	13.11 Q	—	13.07
4	Alberlis Torres (VEN)	13.09 q	—	13.08
5	Jerusa Santos (BRA)	13.16 q	12.99	
6	Tracey Hinton (GBR)	13.14 q	13.18	
7	Paraskevi Kantza (GRE)	13.13 q	13.20	
8	Irene Suarez (VEN)	13.20 q	13.21	
9	Elena Frolova (RUS)	13.48		
10	Miroslava Sedlackova (CZE)	14.00		
	Gracia Sosa (ARG)	DSQ		
