= El Salvador at the 2024 Summer Paralympics =

- Flag of El Salvador
- IPC code: ESA
- NPC: Comite Paralímpico de El Salvador

in Paris, France August 28, 2024 – September 8, 2024
- Competitors: 3 (2 men and 1 woman) in 2 sports
- Flag bearers: Herbert Aceituno; Rebeca Duarte
- Medals: Gold 0 Silver 0 Bronze 0 Total 0

Summer Paralympics appearances (overview)
- 2000; 2004; 2008; 2012; 2016; 2020; 2024

El Salvador competed at the 2024 Summer Paralympics in Paris, France, from 28 August to 8 September 2024.

== Competitors ==
The following is the list of number of competitors in the Games.

Sport	Men	Women	Total
Boccia	1	1	2
Powerlifting	1	0	1
Total	2	1	3

== Boccia ==
Athlete	Event	Pool matches				Playoffs	Quarterfinals	Semifinals	Final / BM	
Athlete	Event	Opposition Score	Opposition Score	Opposition Score	Rank	Opposition Score	Opposition Score	Opposition Score	Opposition Score	Rank
Mario Sayes	Men's individual BC2	Mezík (SVK); L 1–6	Vongsa (THA); L 0–11	Meguenni (FRA); W 5–2	3	Did not advance				=17
Rebeca Duarte	Women's individual BC2	Jankechova (SVK); W 12–0	Yeung (HKG); L 3–3*	—	2 Q	—	Gonçalves (POR); L 4–5	Did not advance		=5

== Powerlifting ==
Athlete	Event	Attempts (kg)				Result (kg)	Rank
Athlete	Event	1	2	3	4	Result (kg)	Rank
Herbert Aceituno	Men's 59 kg	193	~~195~~^{LC}	196	–	196	4

== See also ==
- El Salvador at the 2024 Summer Olympics
- El Salvador at the Paralympics
