= Sanaa Benhama =

Moroccan Paralympic athlete

Personal information
- Nationality: Moroccan
- Born: 9 June 1982 (age 44) Khemisset, Morocco
- Height: 161 cm (63 in)

Sport
- Sport: Athletics
- Disability: visual impairment
- Disability class: T13
- Events: sprint, long jump
- Club: Association Handisport Ennasser
Medal record
Paralympic athletics
Representing Morocco
Paralympic Games
Gold medal – first place	2008 Beijing	100m - T13
Gold medal – first place	2008 Beijing	200m - T13
Gold medal – first place	2008 Beijing	400m - T13
IPC World Championships
Gold medal – first place	2013 Lyon	200m - T13
Gold medal – first place	2017 London	1500 m T13
Silver medal – second place	2011 Christchurch	100m - T13
Silver medal – second place	2011 Christchurch	200m - T13
Silver medal – second place	2013 Lyon	Long jump - T13
Bronze medal – third place	2011 Christchurch	400m - T13
Bronze medal – third place	2013 Lyon	100m - T13
Bronze medal – third place	2015 Doha	200m - T13
Bronze medal – third place	2015 Doha	400m - T13

Sanaa Benhama (born 9 June 1982) is a Paralympic athlete from Morocco competing mainly in category T13 sprint events. She has competed at two Summer Paralympics, most notably at the 2008 Summer Paralympics in Beijing, China where she won three gold medals dominating the sprint field in her class.

== Personal history ==
Benhama was born in Khemisset, Morocco in 1982.

== Athletics career ==
Benhama, who trains out of Association Handisport Ennasser in Salé, made her senior debut as a T13 classification athlete at a meet in Rabat in 2008. Later that year she made her full international debut when she was selected as part of the Morocco team to compete at the 2008 Summer Paralympics in Beijing. She competed in four events, the three sprints and the long jump. In the long jump she made the last eight allowing her to compete at three more attempts, but with her best some distance from the leading pack Benhama withdrew with two jumps remaining, finishing in sixth place. It was in the sprint events that Benhama made an impact at the Games. She began with the 400 metre sprint, qualifying in the fastest time and then setting a new Paralympic record of 55.56 seconds in the finals to take her first gold medal of the Games. She followed this two days later with another gold, this time in the 200 metres, in which she beat her nearest rival, France's Nantenin Keïta by over half a second. Her final event of the 2008 Paralympics was the 100 metres (T13), in which she set a Paralympic record in the heats, qualifying with a time of 12.38 seconds. In the final, an event beset with heavy rain, Benhama recorded a time of 12.28 to take her third gold medal and set a new world record.

Three years later Benhama represented Morocco at the 2011 IPC Athletics World Championships in Christchurch. She took three medals across the sprints, but failed to secure gold in any of them, being beaten by South Africa's Ilse Hayes in the 100 metres and Cuba'a Omara Durand in the 200 metres to take two silver medals; with a bronze in the 400 metre event. The birth of her son in 2012, meant that Benhama took a break from racing that year, and was unable to defend her Paralympic titles in London.

The next year she was back in international competition and won three medals at the 2013 IPC Athletics World Championships in Lyon. a gold in the 100 metres, a bronze in the 200 metres, and her only major international medal in the long jump, a silver. Two years later she entered the 2015 World Championships in Doha she won two bronze medals, in the 200 and 400 metre races. Benhama also represented her country at the 2016 Summer Paralympics in Rio de Janeiro, but did not make the podium in either of her two events, the 100 metre and 400 metre races.
