= Amina Bibi =

Pakistani athlete

Amina Bibi is a paralympian from Pakistan. She was the first woman to represent the country when she competed at the 2004 Paralympic Games in Athens, Greece.

== Career ==
Bibi competed in the T11 athletic (track) events. At the Athens Games she placed 4th in her heat in the 100m with a time of 0:24.23. She did not start in the 200m heats.
