= Kym Crosby =

American Paralympic athlete

Personal information
- Born: February 14, 1993 (age 33) Marysville, California, U.S.
- Home town: Yuba City, California, U.S.
- Education: California State University, Chico
- Height: 5 ft 3 in (160 cm)
- Spouse: Erik Hightower (m. 2017)

Sport
- Country: United States
- Sport: Paralympic athletics
- Disability class: T13
- Events: 100 metres; 400 metres
- Turned pro: 2014
- Coached by: Joaquim Cruz
Medal record
Women's para athletics
Representing the United States
Paralympic Games
Bronze medal – third place	2016 Rio de Janeiro	100m T13
Bronze medal – third place	2020 Tokyo	100m T13
World Championships
Silver medal – second place	2015 Doha	200m T13
Silver medal – second place	2019 Dubai	100m T13
Bronze medal – third place	2015 Doha	100m T13
Bronze medal – third place	2017 London	100m T13
Bronze medal – third place	2017 London	200m T13
Bronze medal – third place	2019 Dubai	200m T13
Bronze medal – third place	2025 New Delhi	100m T13
Bronze medal – third place	2025 New Delhi	200m T13
Parapan American Games
Gold medal – first place	2019 Lima	100m T13

Kym Crosby (born February 14, 1993) is an American para-track and field athlete who competed at the 2016 Summer Paralympics in the T13 100 metres and 400 metres. She won the bronze medal in the 100 metres and set a personal best.

== Early life ==
Crosby was born on February 14, 1993, in Marysville, California to parents Paul and Pauline Crosby. She was born with albinism which left her legally blind. Upon her brother's encouragement, Crosby competed in track and field during her high school years.

== Career ==
After graduating from River Valley High School, Crosby enrolled in California State University, Chico and competed on their track team. As a junior at Chico, Crosby qualified for the United States Paralympic team and made their 2016 Summer Paralympics roster. In her debut Games, Crosby competed in the T13 100 metres and 400 metres. Although she set a personal record during the 400 meters with a time of 57.26 seconds, Crosby finished fourth in the T13 finals. She garnered greater success in the Women's 100 meters race and earned herself a bronze medal.

== Personal life ==
Crosby became engaged to wheelchair racer Erik Hightower on May 8, 2017.

== See also ==
- United States at the 2016 Summer Paralympics
