= Alexandra Dimoglou =

Greek Paralympic athlete (born 1981)

Medal record

Track and field (T13)

Representing Greece

Paralympic Games
Silver medal – second place	2008 Beijing	400m – T13
Bronze medal – third place	2008 Beijing	100m – T13
Bronze medal – third place	2008 Beijing	200m – T13
Bronze medal – third place	2012 London	400m – T13

Alexandra Dimoglou (born 15 December 1981) is a Greek Paralympic track and field athlete competing mainly in category T13 sprint events.

She was awarded as the Best Greek female athlete with a disability for 2008.

She competed in the 2008 Summer Paralympics in Beijing, China. There, she won a silver medal in the women's 400 metres - T13 event, a bronze medal in the women's 100 metres - T13 event and a bronze medal in the women's 200 metres - T13 event.
