= El Salvador at the 2004 Summer Paralympics =

- IPC code: ESA
- NPC: Comité Paralímpico de El Salvador

in Athens
- Competitors: 2 in 1 sport
- Flag bearer: William Rivas
- Medals: Gold 0 Silver 0 Bronze 0 Total 0

Summer Paralympics appearances (overview)
- 2000; 2004; 2008; 2012; 2016; 2020; 2024

El Salvador competed at the 2004 Summer Paralympics in Athens, Greece. The team included two athletes, one man and one woman, neither of whom won a medal.

== Sports ==
=== Athletics ===
==== Men's track ====
Athlete	Class	Event	Heats		Semifinal		Final	
Athlete	Class	Event	Result	Rank	Result	Rank	Result	Rank
William Rivas	T54	100m	17.22	29	did not advance			
William Rivas	T54	Marathon	—				DNS	

==== Women's track ====
Athlete	Class	Event	Heats		Semifinal		Final	
Athlete	Class	Event	Result	Rank	Result	Rank	Result	Rank
Marleny Chauez	T54	200m	40.01	16	did not advance			

== See also ==
- El Salvador at the Paralympics
- El Salvador at the 2004 Summer Olympics
