= 2011 IPC Athletics World Championships – Women's long jump =

The women's long jump at the 2011 IPC Athletics World Championships was held at the QEII Stadium from 23–27 January 2011.

== Medalists ==
Class	Gold	Silver	Bronze
F11	Jia Juntingxian; China	Paraskevi Kantza; Greece	Elisa Montonen; Finland
F13	Ilse Hayes; South Africa	Jessica Gallagher; Australia	Hanna Kaniuk; Belarus
F20	Mikela Ristoski; Croatia	Karolina Kucharczyk; Poland	Krestina Zhukova; Russia
F38	Ramunė Adomaitienė; Lithuania	Marta Langner; Poland	Sonia Mansour; Tunisia
F42	Kelly Cartwright; Australia	Marije Smits; Netherlands	Ewa Zielinska; Poland
F44/46	Nikol Rodomakina; Russia	Carlee Beattie; Australia	Stefanie Reid; Great Britain
