= Leilia Adzhametova =

Ukrainian Paralympic athlete (born 1994)

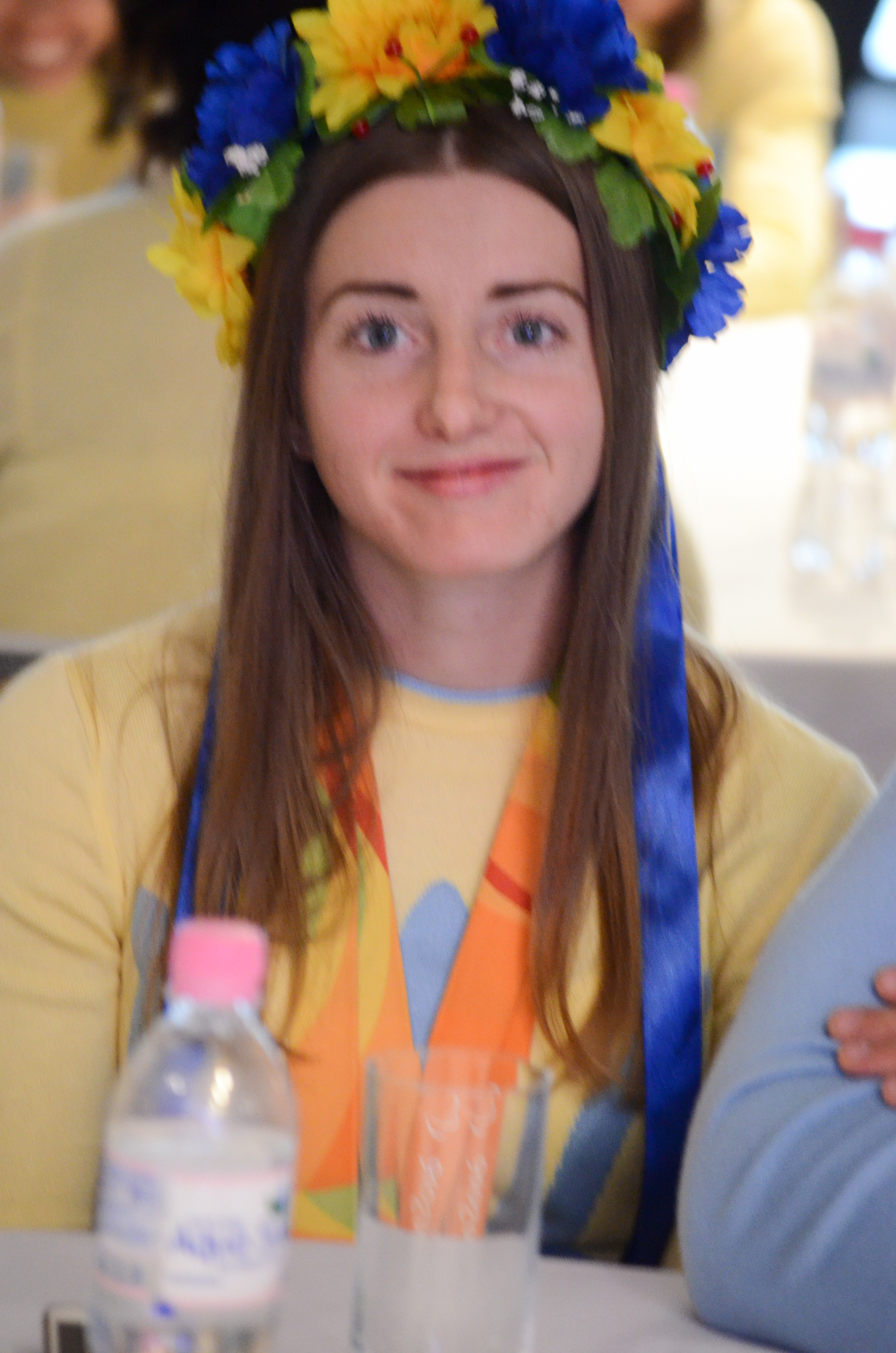
- Adzhametova in 2016

Personal information
- Nationality: Ukrainian
- Born: 3 September 1994 (age 32)

Sport
- Sport: Athletics
- Disability class: T13
Medal record
Women's paralympic athletics
Representing Ukraine
Paralympic Games
Gold medal – first place	2016 Rio de Janeiro	100 m T13
Bronze medal – third place	2016 Rio de Janeiro	400 m T13
IPC World Championships
Gold medal – first place	2019 Dubai	100 m T13
Gold medal – first place	2019 Dubai	200 m T13
Bronze medal – third place	2019 Dubai	400 m T13

Leilia Adzhametova (born 3 September 1994) is a Ukrainian Azerbaijani track and field Paralympic athlete.

Adzhametova competed at the 2016 Summer Paralympics in the T13 classification, winning a gold medal in the women's 100 metres T13 event and a bronze medal in the women's 400 metres T13 event.

At the 2019 World Para Athletics Championships she won gold medals in the women's 100 m T13 and women's 100 m T13 events and a bronze medal in the women's 400 m T13 event.

== See also ==
- Ukraine at the 2016 Summer Paralympics
