= Krestina Zhukova =

Russian Paralympic athlete

Personal information
- Nationality: Russian
- Born: 9 November 1990 (age 35) Shakhunya, Russia

Sport
- Sport: track and field
- Disability class: T20
- Event: long jump
- Club: Nizhegorodets
- Coached by: Evgeny Sukahov
Medal record
Paralympic athletics
Representing Russia
Paralympic Games
Silver medal – second place	2012 London	Long jump F20
IPC World Championships
Silver medal – second place	2013 Lyon	Long jump T20
Bronze medal – third place	2011 Christchurch	Long jump F20
IPC European Championships
Silver medal – second place	2012 Stadskanaal	Long jump T20

Krestina Zhukova (born 9 November 1990) is a Paralympic athlete from Russia who competes in T20 classification track and field events. She won gold for Poland at the 2012 Summer Paralympics in the Long Jump class F20. Zhukova competed for her country at the 2012 Summer Paralympics in London, where she finished second to claim silver.
