= Matthildur Þorsteinsdóttir =

Icelandic Paralympic athlete

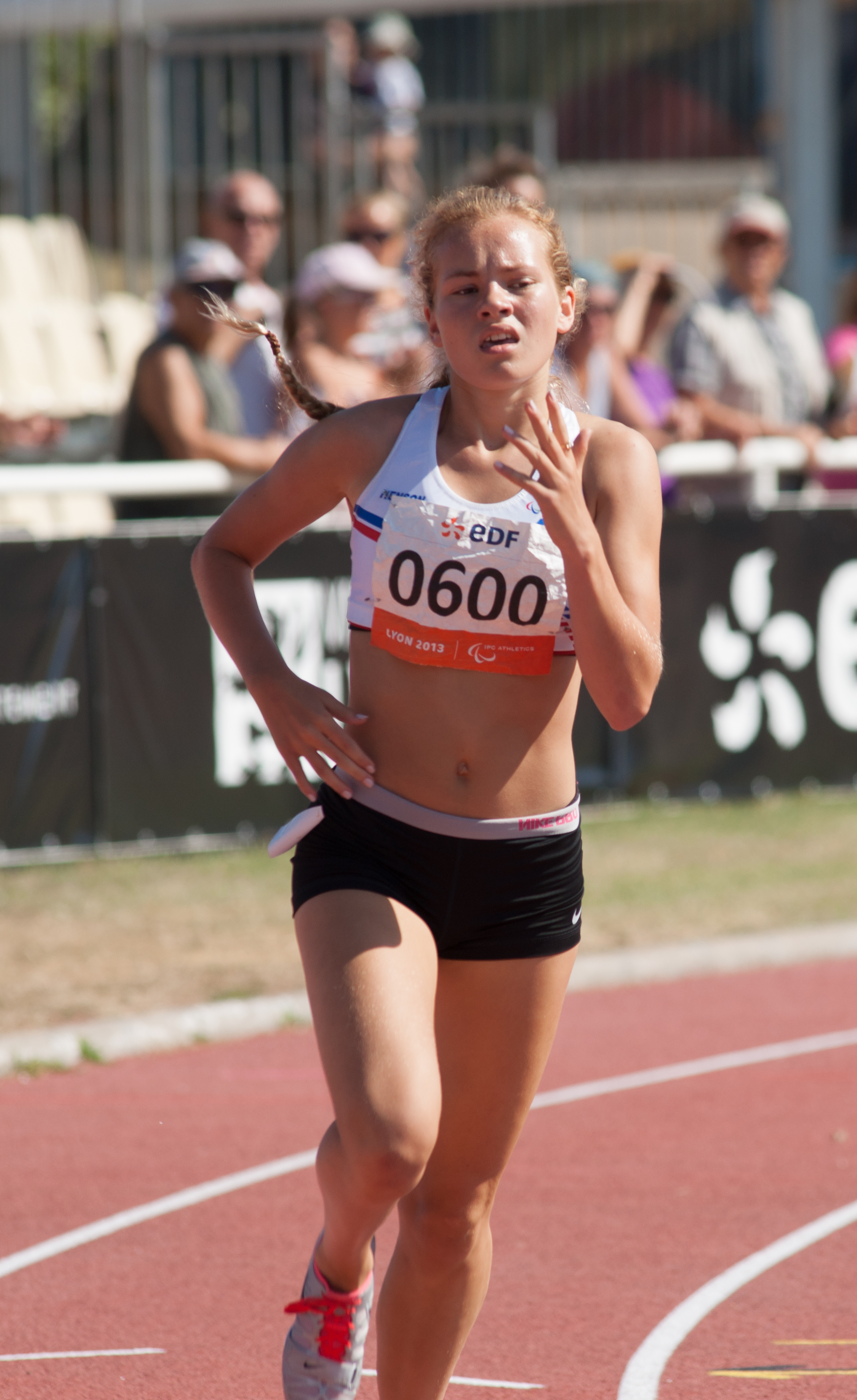

Personal information
- Full name: Matthildur Þorsteinsdóttir
- Born: 8 April 1997 (age 29)

Sport
- Country: Iceland
- Sport: Athletics
- Event(s): Sprint, Long jump
- Club: IFR Reykjavik
- Coached by: Kari Jonsson
Medal record
Women's para athletics
Representing Iceland
European Championships
Bronze medal – third place	2012 Stadskanaal	Long jump – F37

Matthildur Þorsteinsdóttir (born 8 April 1997) is an Icelandic Paralympic track and field athlete, competing mainly in sprint races and the long jump. In 2012 she was nominated to participate in the 2012 Summer Paralympics in London. She placed 8th in the women's long jump F37/38. At the 2012 IPC Athletics European Championships she won a bronze medal in the Women's long jump F 37 class.
