= El Salvador at the 2008 Summer Paralympics =

- IPC code: ESA
- NPC: Comité Paralímpico de El Salvador

in Beijing
- Competitors: 1 in 1 sport
- Medals: Gold 0 Silver 0 Bronze 0 Total 0

Summer Paralympics appearances (overview)
- 2000; 2004; 2008; 2012; 2016; 2020; 2024

El Salvador sent a delegation to compete at the 2008 Summer Paralympics in Beijing, People's Republic of China. The delegation consisted of a single competitor, runner Zulma Cruz.

== Athletics ==
Athlete	Event	Heat		Final	
Athlete	Event	Time	Rank	Time	Rank
Zulma Cruz	Women's 100 metres T13	15.79	6	Did not advance	
Zulma Cruz	Women's 200 metres T13	32.65	6	Did not advance	

== See also ==
- El Salvador at the Paralympics
- El Salvador at the 2008 Summer Olympics
