= Athletics at the 2008 Summer Paralympics – Women's 100 metres T13 =

Athletics for women at the paralympics

The Women's 100m T13 had its competition held on September 16, with the first round at 9:15 and the Final at 18:18.

== Medalists ==
Gold	Sanaa Benhama; Morocco
Silver	Ilse Hayes; South Africa
Bronze	Alexandra Dimoglou; Greece

== Results ==
Place	Athlete	Round 1	Final
1	Sanaa Benhama (MAR)	12.38 PR	12.28 WR
2	Ilse Hayes (RSA)	12.58 Q	12.45
3	Alexandra Dimoglou (GRE)	12.90 Q	12.56
4	Nantenin Keita (FRA)	12.61 Q	12.57
5	Maryna Chyshko (UKR)	12.72 Q	12.58
6	Omara Durand (CUB)	12.65 Q	12.59
7	Anthi Karagianni (GRE)	12.86 q	12.81
8	Katrin Muller-Rottgardt (GER)	12.96 q	12.85
9	Courtney Harbeck (AUS)	13.03	
10	Tetiana Smyrnova (UKR)	13.16	
11	Joana Silva (BRA)	13.17	
12	Yuliya Korunchak (UKR)	13.58	
13	Indayana Martins (BRA)	13.68	
14	Aksana Sivitskaya (BLR)	13.91	
15	Nathalie Nilsson (SWE)	14.01	
16	Uran Sawada (JPN)	14.18	
17	Zulma Cruz (ESA)	15.79	
