= El Salvador at the 2012 Summer Paralympics =

- IPC code: ESA
- NPC: Comité Paralímpico de El Salvador

in London
- Competitors: 1 in 1 sport
- Medals: Gold 0 Silver 0 Bronze 0 Total 0

Summer Paralympics appearances (overview)
- 2000; 2004; 2008; 2012; 2016; 2020; 2024

El Salvador competed at the 2012 Summer Paralympics in London, United Kingdom from August 29 to September 9, 2012.

== Athletics ==
Men’s Track and Road Events

Athlete	Event	Heat		Final	
Athlete	Event	Result	Rank	Result	Rank
Luis Morales Garcia	100m T54	17.62	7	did not advance	

== See also ==
- El Salvador at the 2012 Summer Olympics
