= Eva Ngui =

Spanish Paralympic athlete (born 1985)

Personal information
- Full name: Eva Ngui Nchama
- Nationality: Spanish
- Born: 9 June 1985 (age 41) Malabo, Equatorial Guinea

Sport
- Country: Spain
- Sport: Track and field
- Disability class: T12
Medal record
Women's paralympic athletics
Representing Spain
Paralympic Games
Bronze medal – third place	2008 Beijing	100 m T12
Bronze medal – third place	2008 Beijing	200 m T12
IPC World Championships
Bronze medal – third place	2011 Christchurch	100 m T12

Eva Ngui Nchama (born 9 June 1985) is a Paralympian athlete competing mainly in category T12 sprint events. Born in Equatorial Guinea, she represents Spain internationally. She has competed at three Paralympic Games, 2004 Summer Paralympics, 2008 Summer Paralympics and 2012 Summer Paralympics, and earned a pair bronze medals, both coming at the 2008 Games.

== Personal ==
Ngui was born in Malabo, Equatorial Guinea. She has albinism, a condition she has had since birth. She moved to Spain in 2003, where she lived in Hospitalet de Llobregat and continued to reside there in 2008.

== Athletics ==
Ngui is a Paralympian athlete from Spain competing mainly in category T12 sprint events, who started competing in track and field in 2001. She is a member of ISS L'Hospitalet Atletisme, an athletic club in L'Hospitalet.

Around 2008, Ngui spent a year training at the High Performance Centre in Madrid. At that time, she was coached by Manuel Pascua Piqueras. She competed in the 2011 Spanish national championships in Vizcaya. She qualified for and competed in the 2011 IPC Athletics World Championships where she was one of thirty-two competitors representing Spain. Competing at the actual event, she won a bronze medal in the T12 100 meter event.

In 2012, Ngui was a recipient of a Plan ADO €18,000 athlete scholarship with a €3,000 reserve and a €2,500 coaching scholarship. In May 2012, she competed at the Paralympic World Cup in Manchester, earning a third-place finish in the 100 meters and another in the 200 meters. Prior to the start of the London Games, she trained with several other visually impaired Spanish track and field athletes in Logroño. In the lead up to the London Paralympics, in July 2012, she competed in a Diamond League race at the Crystal Palace National Sports Centre in London. In May 2013, she competed in the Spanish national championships, where she earned gold medals in the 100 and 200 meter events. In July 2013, she participated in the 2013 IPC Athletics World Championships.

=== Paralympics ===
Ngui competed in the 2004 Summer Paralympics in Athens, Greece. There she went out in the semi-finals of the women's 100 metres — T12 event She also competed at the 2008 Summer Paralympics in Beijing, China. There she won a bronze medal in the women's 100 metres — T12 event and a bronze medal in the women's 200 metres — T12 event. Her 200-meter bronze medal came after the Spanish delegation complained that the Angolan runner Evalina Alexandre who finished ahead of her had been assisted by her guide in a way that violated the rules. Upon review, race officials agreed and then award Ngui bronze. She raced at the 2012 Summer Paralympics and was the 14th runner to finish.
