= Elena Zhdanova =

Russian Paralympic athlete

Personal information
- Born: 23 October 1980 (age 45) Biysk, Russian SFSR

Sport
- Sport: Paralympic athletics
- Disability class: T12
- Event: Sprint
Medal record
Representing Russia
Paralympic Games
Bronze medal – third place	1996 Atlanta	400 metres - T11
Bronze medal – third place	2000 Sydney	200 metres - T12

Elena Aleksandrovna Zhdanova (Russian: Елена Александровна Жданова; born 23 October 1980) is a paralympic sprinter from Russia. She competed at the 1996, 2000 and 2004 Paralympics and won bronze medals in the 400 m in 1996 and in the 200 m in 2000. She placed fourth in the 100 m and 200 m in 2004.
