= Powerlifting at the 2020 Summer Paralympics – Men's 59 kg =

Powerlifting – Men's 59 kg at the XVI Paralympic Games
- Venue: Tokyo International Forum
- Date: 27 August 2021
- Competitors: 10 from 10 nations

Medalists
1st place, gold medalist(s)		Qi Yongkai	China
2nd place, silver medalist(s)		Sherif Othman	Egypt
3rd place, bronze medalist(s)		Herbert Aceituno	El Salvador

The men's 59 kg powerlifting event at the 2020 Summer Paralympics was contested on 27 August at Tokyo International Forum.

== Records ==
There are twenty powerlifting events, corresponding to ten weight classes each for men and women. Prior to this competition, the existing world and Paralympic records were as follows.

World Record	Sherif Othman (EGY)	211.0 kg	Rio de Janeiro, Brazil	9 September 2016
Paralympic Record	Sherif Othman (EGY)	211.0 kg	Rio de Janeiro, Brazil	9 September 2016

== Results ==
Rank	Name	Body weight (kg)	Attempts (kg)				Result (kg)
Rank	Name	Body weight (kg)	1	2	3	4	Result (kg)
1st place, gold medalist(s)	Qi Yongkai (CHN)	57.75	~~183~~	185	187	–	187
2nd place, silver medalist(s)	Sherif Othman (EGY)	58.41	181	184	187	–	187
3rd place, bronze medalist(s)	Herbert Aceituno (ESA)	57.70	182	184	~~187~~	–	184
4	Juan Garrido Acevedo (CHI)	58.36	180	183	~~186~~	–	183
5	Ibrahim Dauda (NGR)	57.73	150	160	170	–	170
6	Ali Jawad (GBR)	58.52	163	164	~~166~~	–	164
7	Paschalis Kouloumoglou (GRE)	58.11	156	163	~~166~~	–	163
8	Mariusz Tomczyk (POL)	58.13	156	161	~~166~~	–	161
9	Niel Garcia Trelles (PER)	58.60	145	151	~~161~~	–	151
10	Tomohiro Kose (JPN)	58.03	135	145	~~151~~	–	145
