= Purificacion Santamarta =

Spanish Paralympic athlete

Medal record

Paralympic athletics

Representing Spain

Paralympic Games
Gold medal – first place	1984 New York	100 metres - B1
Gold medal – first place	1984 New York	400 metres - B1
Gold medal – first place	1988 Seoul	100 metres - B1
Gold medal – first place	1992 Barcelona	100 metres - B1
Gold medal – first place	1992 Barcelona	200 metres - B1
Gold medal – first place	1992 Barcelona	400 metres - B1
Gold medal – first place	1992 Barcelona	800 metres - B1
Gold medal – first place	1996 Atlanta	100 metres - T10
Gold medal – first place	1996 Atlanta	200 metres - T10
Gold medal – first place	1996 Atlanta	400 metres - T10
Gold medal – first place	2000 Sydney	400 metres - T11
Silver medal – second place	1980 Arnhem	400 metres - A
Silver medal – second place	1988 Seoul	400 metres - B1
Silver medal – second place	1988 Seoul	Long Jump - B1
Silver medal – second place	2000 Sydney	100 metres - T12
Bronze medal – third place	2004 Athens	200 metres - T11

Purificacion Santamarta is a paralympic athlete from Spain competing mainly in category T11 sprint events.

== Biography ==
Purificacion has competed in seven Paralympics winning a total of 16 medals eleven of them gold. Her first games were way back in 1980 where she competed in the 60m and 400m winning the class A silver medal in the 400m. In 1984 she competed in the long jump and won the gold medal in both the 100m and 400m. Her third games were in Seoul in 1988 where she won defended her 100m title and won silver medals in the 400m and long jump. The 1992 Summer Paralympics were in front of her home crowd and she didn't disappoint them winning her third consecutive 100m title and adding 200m, 400m and 800m golds. In 1996 she succeeded in defending her 100m, 200m and 400m titles, but didn't attempt the 800m. 2000 saw her lose in the 100m for the first time in five games when Adria Santos of Brazil beat her in to second place but she did make it three consecutive 400m golds. In 2004 Summer Paralympics she managed a bronze in the 200m but missed out in the 100m and 400m.
