= Wu Chunmiao =

Chinese Paralympic athlete

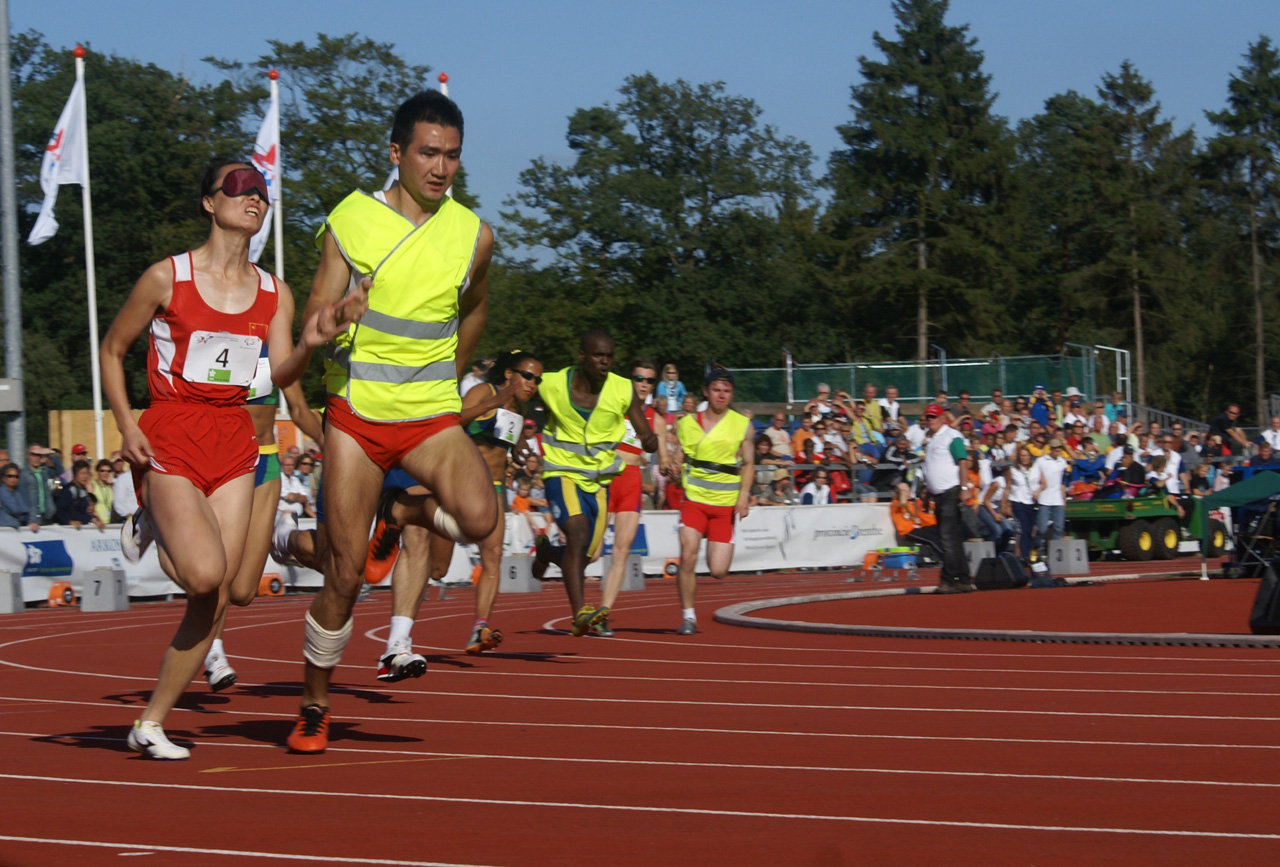
- Chunmiao at 2006 IPC Athletics World Championships

Personal information
- Nationality: Chinese
- Born: 1984 (age 41–42) Shandong, China

Sport
- Country: China
- Sport: Athletics
- Disability class: T11
- Event: sprints

Achievements and titles
- Paralympic finals: 2008
Medal record
Women's paralympic athletics
Representing China
Paralympic Games
Gold medal – first place	2004 Athens	200 metres - T11
Silver medal – second place	2004 Athens	100 metres - T11
Gold medal – first place	2008 Beijing	100 m T11
Silver medal – second place	2008 Beijing	200 m T11
IPC World Championships
Bronze medal – third place	2011 Christchurch	100 m T11
Asian Para Games
Gold medal – first place	2010 Guangzhou	100m T11

Wu Chunmiao (吴春苗; born 1984) is a Paralympian athlete from China competing mainly in category T11 sprint events.

Wu was born in 1984, and became blind at the age of 10. At the 2004 Summer Paralympics, Wu competed in the T12 400m, and won a silver medal in the T11 100m and a gold in the T11 200m. She competed in the 2008 Summer Paralympics in Beijing, China. There she won a gold medal in the women's 100 metres – T11 event and a silver medal in the women's 200 metres – T11 event. She took the Paralympic Oath for athletes at the 2008 Summer Paralympics in Beijing.
