= Rosalía Lázaro =

Spanish Paralympic athlete

Medal record

Paralympic athletics

Representing Spain

Paralympic Games
Gold medal – first place	2000 Sydney	Long Jump - F12
Silver medal – second place	1996 Atlanta	Long Jump - F10-11
Silver medal – second place	2004 Athens	Long Jump - F12

Rosalía Lázaro is a Paralympian athlete from Spain competing mainly in category F12 long jump events.

Lázaro has competed in every summer Paralympics from 1992 to 2008. She has always competed in the long jump but has also competed in the 100m in 1992 and 2008 and the pentathlon in 1996. Across all these games she has won three medals, all in long jump, her first was a silver in the F10/11 class in 1996, she improved on this in 2000 winning the F12 class before winning a second silver in the F12 class in 2004.
