= Virginie Dreux =

French Paralympic athlete

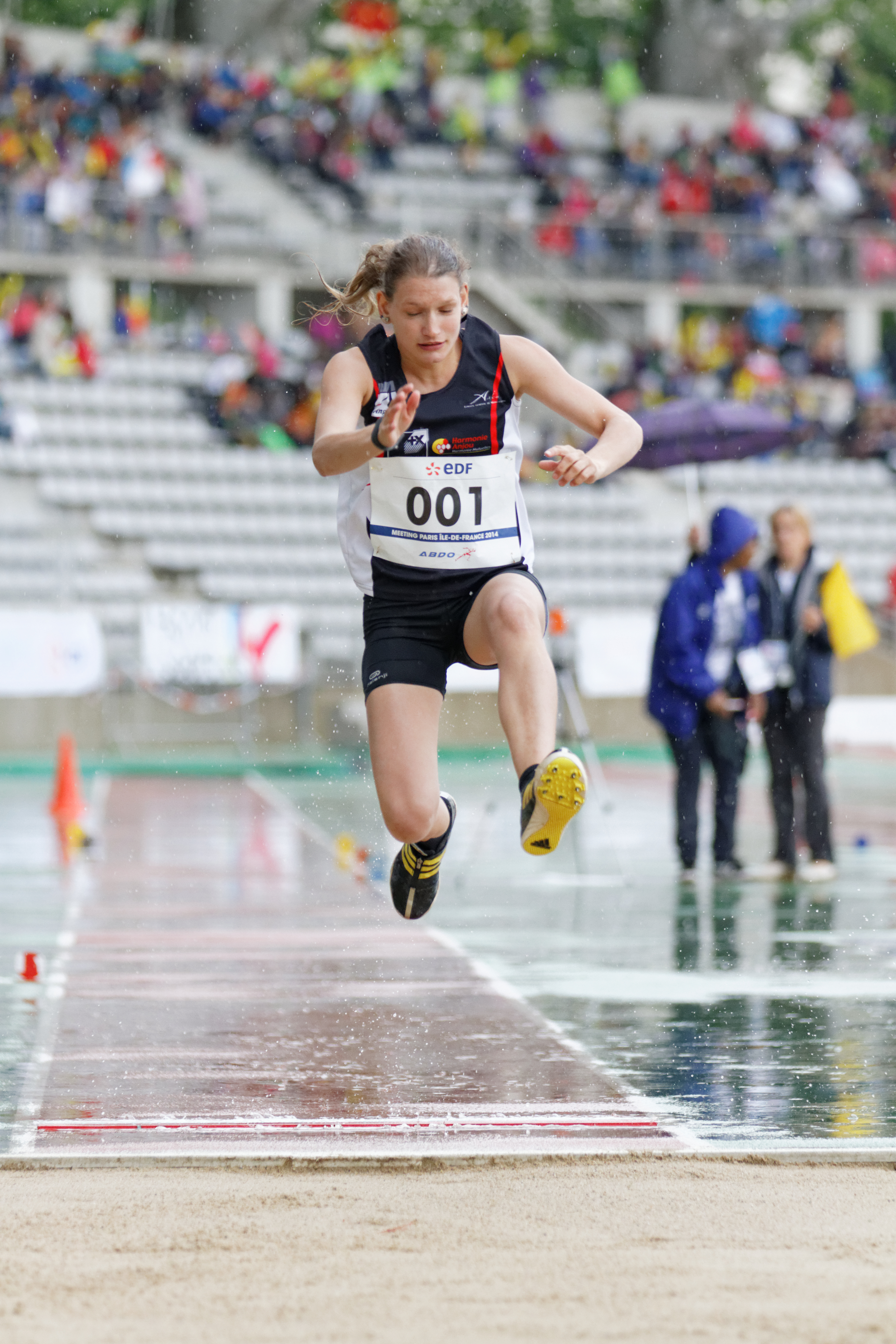
- Dreux in 2014

Personal information
- Born: 27 June 1988 (age 38) Angers, France

Sport
- Country: France
- Sport: Paralympic athletics
- Disability class: T20, F20
- Event(s): Heptathlon; Long jump 400 metre hurdles
- Club: FFSA Paris
- Coached by: Michelle Jan; Julien Hericourt
Medal record
Paralympic athletics
Representing France
INAS Global Games
Silver medal – second place	2015 Guayaquil	Women's heptathlon
Silver medal – second place	2019 Brisbane	Women's heptathlon
Bronze medal – third place	2015 Guayaquil	Women's 400m hurdles
INAS World Championships
Gold medal – first place	2017 Bangkok	Women's heptathlon
Bronze medal – third place	2013 Prague	Women's 400m hurdles
INAS European Open Championships
Gold medal – first place	2016 Ankara	Women's long jump
Gold medal – first place	2016 Ankara	Women's heptathlon
Bronze medal – third place	2014 Bergen op Zoom	Women's heptathlon
Bronze medal – third place	2018 Paris	Women's 100m hurdles

Virginie Dreux is a French Paralympic athlete who competes in international level events. She mainly competes in heptathlon events at INAS competitions and also competed in long jump events at the 2012 IPC Athletics European Championships and 2013 IPC Athletics World Championships.

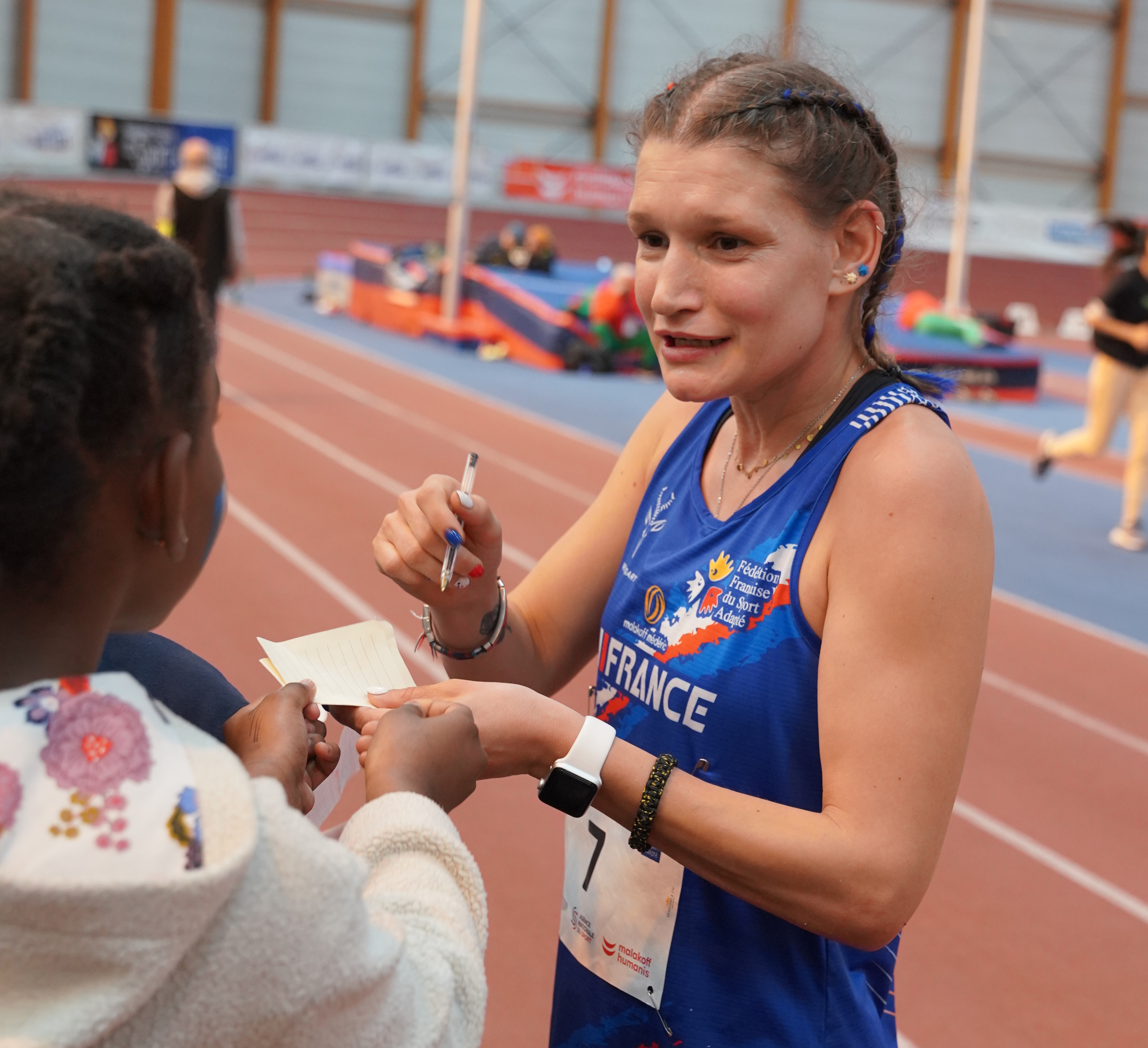
INAS Global Games, 2024
