= Ilse Hayes =

South African Paralympic athlete

Personal information
- Nationality: South African
- Born: 30 August 1985 (age 40) Johannesburg, South Africa
- Height: 163 cm (64 in)

Sport
- Sport: Athletics
- Disability: congenital
- Disability class: T13
- Event(s): sprint, long jump
- Club: Maties ParaSport Club
- Coached by: Suzanne Ferreira
Medal record
Women's paralympic athletics
Representing South Africa
Paralympic Games
Gold medal – first place	2008 Beijing	Long jump F13
Gold medal – first place	2012 London	Long jump F13
Silver medal – second place	2008 Beijing	100 m T13
Silver medal – second place	2012 London	100 m T13
Silver medal – second place	2016 Rio de Janeiro	100 m T13
Silver medal – second place	2016 Rio de Janeiro	400 m T13
Bronze medal – third place	2004 Athens	400 m T13
IPC World Championships
Gold medal – first place	2002 Lille	400 m T13
Gold medal – first place	2011 Christchurch	100 m T13
Gold medal – first place	2011 Christchurch	Long jump T13
Gold medal – first place	2013 Lyon	Long jump T13
Gold medal – first place	2015 Doha	100 m T13
Gold medal – first place	2015 Doha	200 m T13
Silver medal – second place	2013 Lyon	100 m T13
Bronze medal – third place	2002 Lille	100 m T13
Bronze medal – third place	2006 Assen	200 m T13
Bronze medal – third place	2006 Assen	400 m T13
Bronze medal – third place	2011 Christchurch	200 m T13

Ilse Hayes (born 30 August 1985), also known as Ilse Carstens, is a Paralympian athlete from South Africa competing mainly in category T13 sprint events. Hayes has competed for her country at four Summer Paralympics beginning with the 2004 Summer Paralympics in Athens, Greece. She has won medals at each of the four games including two gold medals, both in the long jump, at Beijing (2008) and London (2012). As well as her Paralympic success Hayes is a multiple medal winner at World Championship level.

== Personal history ==
Hayes was born in Johannesburg, South Africa in 1985. At the age of eleven she was diagnosed with Stargardt disease, an inherited form of juvenile macular degeneration, which causes progressive loss of vision. She was educated at the University of Stellenbosch, where she studied sports science and pediatrics. She is married to Cassie Carstens and they reside in Stellenbosch.

== Athletics career ==
Hayes broke onto the international sporting stage when she entered the 2002 IPC Athletics World Championships in Lille, France. She entered three events in the T13 category, winning gold in the 400 metres sprint and a bronze in the 100 metres. She also entered the long jump, but her best distance of 4.93 saw her fall just outside the medal positions in fourth. This led her to the 2004 Summer Paralympics in Athens where she took her first Paralympic medal, a bronze in the women's 400 metres T13 event. She also finished fifth in the women's 100 metres T13 event.

In 2006 Hayes entered her second World Championships, this time is Assen in the Netherlands. She took two more bronze medals, this time in the 200 and 400 metre sprints. She improved her long jump result from four years prior by posting a distance of 5.19, but she still failed to make the podium. Her biggest success to date would come two year later at the 2008 Summer Paralympics in Beijing, when she won her first gold medal. There she won first place in the long jump, recording a winning jump of 5.68 at her fourth attempt to beat Greece's Anthi Karagianni into second place by 5 centimetres. Hayes also took home a silver medal from Beijing from the 100 metre sprint.

At the 2011 IPC Athletics World Championships in Christchurch, Hayes added the world long jump title to her Paralympic success. A jump of 5.80 metres gave her gold, and a second top spot on the podium followed with a win in the 100 metres. She then went on to further success at the 2012 Summer Paralympics in London, successfully defending her long jump title. Hayes dominated the field, beating her nearest rival, Algeria's Lynda Hamri into a distance second place. She also added the T13 100 metres silver medal at London.

In 2013 Hayes was awarded the Order of Ikhamanga (silver) by president Jacob Zuma; for Her courageous and relentless pursuit of excellence and incredible physical endurance. In the run up to the 2016 Summer Paralympics, Hayes took part in two more IPC World Championships. She won a total of four medals, gold in the long jump and silver in the 100 metres in Lyon in 2013 and double gold in the 100 and 200 metre sprints in the 2015 in Doha. Hayes was unable to attempt a second defence of her long jump title, after the T13 event was removed from the schedule for the 2016 Paralympic Games in Rio. Despite this set back she won two silver medals, in the 100 and 200 metre T13 sprints.
