= Anna Kaniuk =

Belarusian Paralympic athlete (born 1984)

Personal information
- Nationality: Belarusian
- Born: 16 August 1984 (age 41)
- Height: 170 cm (5 ft 7 in)

Sport
- Country: Belarus
- Sport: Athletics
- Disability class: T12, F12
- Event: sprint
- Club: Sports and Tourism Ministry
- Coached by: Vladimir Mikhailov
Medal record
Paralympic athletics
Representing Belarus
Paralympic Games
Bronze medal – third place	2004 Athens	Long jump - F12
Bronze medal – third place	2012 London	Long jump - F11-12
IPC World Championships
Bronze medal – third place	2002 Lille	long jump - F12
Bronze medal – third place	2011 Christchurch	long jump - F13
IPC Athletics European Championships
Gold medal – first place	2012 Stadskanaal	long jump - F12
Silver medal – second place	2012 Stadskanaal	100 m - T12
Silver medal – second place	2016 Grosseto	long jump - F12

Anna Kaniuk (Belarusian: Ганна Канюк, sometimes recorded as Hanna Kaniuk, born 16 August 1984) is a visually impaired Paralympian athlete from Belarus competing mainly in T12 classification sprint and long jump events. Kaniuk has represented her country at three Summer Paralympics winning two bronze medals, the first at the 2004 Athens Games and the second in London in 2012. Kaniuk has also won medals at IPC World and European Championships.
