= Olena Gliebova =

Ukrainian Paralympic athlete (born 1981)

Personal information
- Born: 19 January 1981 (age 45) Komsomolsk, Ukrainian SSR
- Height: 1.82 m (6 ft 0 in)
- Weight: 59 kg (130 lb)

Sport
- Country: Ukraine
- Sport: Paralympic athletics
- Disability: Visual impairment
- Disability class: T13
- Coached by: Svetlana Tverdokhleb
- Retired: 2017
Medal record
Paralympic athletics
Representing Ukraine
World Championships
Gold medal – first place	2013 Lyon	Women's 100m T13
Gold medal – first place	2013 Lyon	Women's 400m T13

Olena Gliebova (born 19 January 1981) is a retired visually impaired Ukrainian Paralympic athlete who competed in international level events.
