= Olga Semenova =

Russian Paralympic athlete

Medal record

Paralympic Games

Paralympic athletics

Representing Russia
Silver medal – second place	1996 Atlanta	Pentathlon - P10-12

Track and field (P13)
Gold medal – first place	2000 Sydney	Pentathlon - P13
Gold medal – first place	2004 Athens	100m - T13
Gold medal – first place	2004 Athens	400m - T13

Olga Semenova (ne Olga Tchourkina) is a Paralympian athlete from Russia competing mainly in category P13 sprint events. She formerly competed in P11 pentathlon events.

== Career ==
Olga competed in the pentathlon at the 1996 Summer Paralympics winning the silver medal behind American Marla Runyan who set a new world record to win. She competed in the 2000 Summer Paralympics in Sydney, Australia. There she won a gold medal in the women's Pentathlon - P13 event. She also competed at the 2004 Summer Paralympics in Athens, Greece. There she won a gold medal in the women's 100 metres - T13 event and a gold medal in the women's 400 metres - T13 event. She also competed at the 2008 Summer Paralympics in Beijing, China. There she did not finish in the women's 100 metres - T13 event and went out in the first round of the women's 400 metres - T13 event
