= Ádria Santos =

Brazilian Paralympic athlete

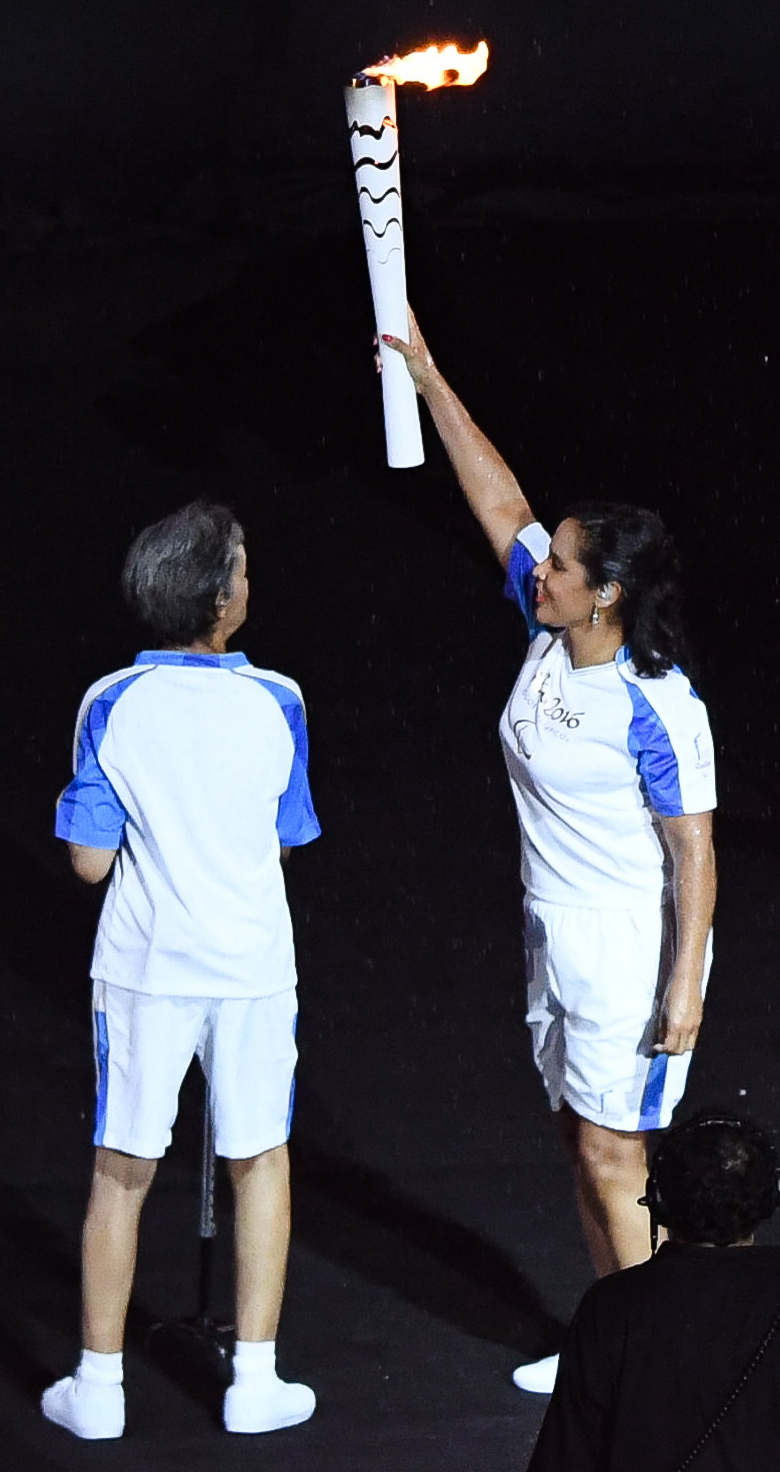
- Santos (right) at the 2016 Paralympics

Personal information
- Full name: Ádria Rocha Santos
- Born: 11 August 1974 (age 51) Nanuque, Brazil

Sport
- Sport: Paralympic athletics
- Disability class: T11
- Event: Sprint
Medal record
Representing Brazil
Paralympic Games
Gold medal – first place	1992 Barcelona	100m B2
Gold medal – first place	2000 Sydney	100m T12
Gold medal – first place	2000 Sydney	200m T11
Gold medal – first place	2004 Athens	100m T12
Silver medal – second place	1988 Seoul	100m B2
Silver medal – second place	1988 Seoul	400m B2
Silver medal – second place	1988 Seoul	400m B2
Silver medal – second place	1996 Atlanta	100m T10
Silver medal – second place	2000 Sydney	400m T11
Silver medal – second place	2004 Athens	200m T11
Silver medal – second place	2004 Athens	400m T12
Bronze medal – third place	2008 Beijing	100m T11
Parapan American Games
Silver medal – second place	2007 Rio de Janeiro	200m T11

Ádria Rocha Santos (born 11 August 1974) is a retired Paralympic sprinter from Brazil. Born nearly blind, she completely lost her vision by 1994. She competed in category T11 events at six consecutive Paralympics from 1988 to 2008 and won at least one medal on each occasion. She was one of the final torchbearers at the 2016 Summer Paralympics opening ceremony.

In 2003 Santos married Rafael, a former pole vaulter who served as her guide and coach. The couple has a daughter.
