= Svitlana Gorbenko =

Ukrainian Paralympic athlete

Medal record

Track and field (athletics)

Representing Ukraine

Paralympic Games
Bronze medal – third place	2008 Beijing	Long Jump - F13

Svitlana Gorbenko is a Paralympian athlete from Ukraine competing mainly in category F13 long jump and T13 sprint events.

She competed in the 2004 Summer Paralympics in Athens, Greece in both the T13 100m and F13 long jump she failed to win a medal in either event. She did better in the 2008 Summer Paralympics in Beijing, China where she concentrated on the F13 long jump and came away with a bronze medal.
