= Maria José Alves =

Brazilian Paralympic athlete (born 1977)

Personal information
- Born: 10 March 1977 (age 49) Ceará, Brazil

Sport
- Disability class: T11, T12, T13
Medal record
Track and field (athletics)
Representing Brazil
Paralympic Games
Bronze medal – third place	1996 Atlanta	100m T11
Bronze medal – third place	1996 Atlanta	200m T11
Bronze medal – third place	2004 Athens	100m T12
Bronze medal – third place	2004 Athens	200m T12
Parapan American Games
Bronze medal – third place	2007 Rio de Janeiro	200m T13

Maria José Alves (born 10 March 1977) is a paralympic athlete from Brazil competing mainly in category T12 sprinting events.

Maria Jose has competed in four paralympics, winning four medals all of which were bronze. Her first games were in 1996 where she competed in the 100m, 200m, 400m and long jump winning bronze in both the shorter events. The 2000 Summer Paralympics saw her compete in just the 100m and 200m but without any medal success. In both 2004 and 2008 she competed in the 100m, 200m and 400m and it was in the 2004 games that she won her last two bronze medals in the 100m and 200m again.
