= Herbert Aceituno =

Salvadoran Paralympic powerlifter

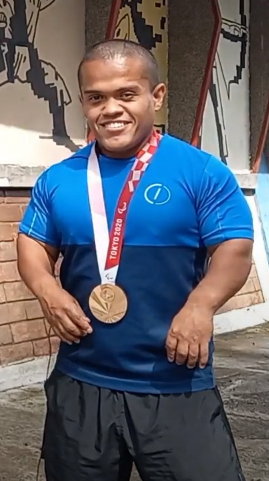
- Aceituno in 2021

Personal information
- Born: 1 November 1985 (age 40) San Salvador, El Salvador

Sport
- Country: El Salvador
- Sport: Paralympic powerlifting
- Disability: Short stature
Medal record
Paralympic Games
Bronze medal – third place	2020 Tokyo	59 kg
World Championships
Silver medal – second place	2021 Tbilisi	59 kg
Silver medal – second place	2023 Dubai	59 kg
Parapan American Games
Gold medal – first place	2019 Lima	65 kg
Gold medal – first place	2023 Santiago	59 kg

Herbert Aceituno (born 1 November 1985) is a Salvadoran Paralympic powerlifter of short stature. He is a bronze medalist at the 2020 Summer Paralympics held in Tokyo, Japan, a silver medalist at the 2021 World Para Powerlifting Championships held in Tbilisi, Georgia and a gold medalist at the 2019 Parapan American Games held in Lima, Peru.

== Career ==
Aceituno competed in the men's 72 kg event at the 2016 Summer Paralympics held in Rio de Janeiro, Brazil without a successful lift. He was also the flag bearer for El Salvador during the Parade of Nations at the opening ceremony of the event.

Aceituno won the bronze medal in the men's 59 kg event at the 2020 Summer Paralympics held in Tokyo, Japan. It became the first ever medal achievement for El Salvador at the Paralympics. He was also one of the flag bearers for El Salvador during the Parade of Nations as part of the opening ceremony of the 2020 Summer Paralympics. A few months later, he won the silver medal in his event at the 2021 World Para Powerlifting Championships held in Tbilisi, Georgia. This was the first ever medal achievement for El Salvador at the World Para Powerlifting Championships.

At the 2017 World Para Powerlifting Championships held in Mexico City, Mexico, he finished in 8th place in the men's 65 kg event. In July 2019, he competed at the World Para Powerlifting Championships held in Nur-Sultan, Kazakhstan. A month later, at the Parapan American Games held in Lima, Peru, he won the gold medal in the men's 65 kg event. He also set a new Parapan American record of 182 kg. In December 2019, at the inaugural Panam Sports Awards, Aceituno won the award of Best Male Para Athlete for his achievement at the 2019 Parapan American Games.

Aceituno also won the gold medal in the men's 59 kg event at the 2023 Parapan American Games held in Santiago, Chile.

== Results ==
Year	Venue	Weight	Attempts (kg)			Total	Rank
Year	Venue	Weight	1	2	3	Total	Rank
Summer Paralympics
2016	Rio de Janeiro, Brazil	72 kg	~~185~~	~~185~~	~~185~~	—	NM
2021	Tokyo, Japan	59 kg	182	184	~~187~~	184	3rd place, bronze medalist(s)
World Championships
2017	Mexico City, Mexico	65 kg	~~165~~	~~165~~	165	165	8
2019	Nur-Sultan, Kazakhstan	65 kg	~~179~~	179	~~182~~	179	6
2021	Tbilisi, Georgia	59 kg	~~182~~	182	183	183	2nd place, silver medalist(s)
Parapan American Games
2019	Lima, Peru	65 kg	~~178~~	180	182	182	1st place, gold medalist(s)
