= Aksana Sivitskaya =

Belarusian Paralympic athlete

Medal record

Women's para-athletics

Representing Belarus

Paralympic Games
| Silver medal – second place | 2000 Sydney | Long Jump - F12 |
| Bronze medal – third place | 2004 Athens | Long Jump - F13 |

Aksana Sivitskaya (Belarusian: Аксана Сівіцкая, born 4 August 1974) is a Paralympic athlete from Belarus competing mainly in category T12 sprint and F12 long jump events.

Aksana competed in the 2000, 2004 and 2008 Summer Paralympics in both the 100m and long jump. She never won a medal in the 100m but did win a silver in the long jump in 2000 and a bronze in 2004.

At the 2012 Summer Paralympics she rowed in the mixed coxed four.
