= Assia El Hannouni =

French Paralympic athlete

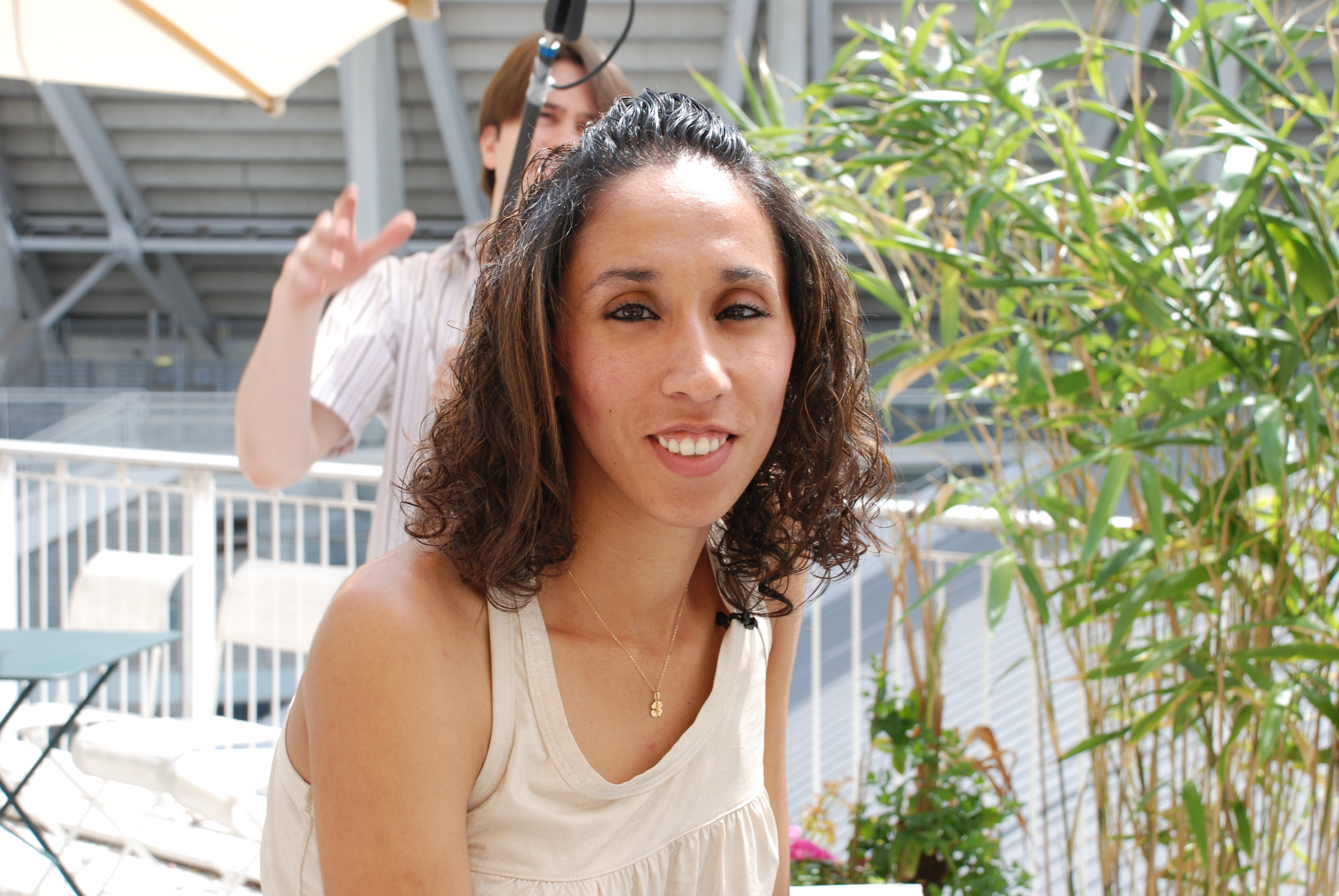
- El Hannouni in 2008

Personal information
- Born: 30 May 1981 (age 45) Dijon, France
- Height: 178 cm (5 ft 10 in)
- Weight: 56 kg (123 lb)
Medal record
Women's para athletics
Representing France
Paralympic Games
Gold medal – first place	2004 Athens	100 m T12
Gold medal – first place	2004 Athens	200 m T12
Gold medal – first place	2004 Athens	400 m T12
Gold medal – first place	2004 Athens	800 m T12
Gold medal – first place	2008 Beijing	200 m T12
Gold medal – first place	2008 Beijing	400 m T12
Gold medal – first place	2012 London	100 m T12
Gold medal – first place	2012 London	200 m T12
Silver medal – second place	2008 Beijing	800 m T12—13
Silver medal – second place	2008 Beijing	1500 m T13

Assia El Hannouni (born 30 May 1981, in Dijon) is a French track and field athlete who specialises in the 800 metres Paralympic sprint. She has Retinitis pigmentosa which means that she is almost blind, with less than one tenth vision in her left eye, and zero in her right eye. She also runs against athletes without disabilities, in 800m sprint events.

Representing her country at the 2004 Summer Paralympics in Athens, she won four gold medals, winning the 100m, 200m, 400m and 800m sprints, and breaking the world record in each event.

She represented France again at the 2008 Summer Paralympics in Beijing, and was the country's flagbearer during the Games' opening ceremony. She won silver in the 800m sprint (T13/12) with a time of 2’4’’96, before winning silver in the 1500m, and gold in both the 200m and 400m sprints.

In 2007, she set a new world record in the women's 800 metre sprint in her disability category, with a time of 2’6’’76. The same year, she competed against non-disabled athletes in the 800 metres at the French national indoors championships, finishing fifth.

As of 2007, El Hannouni is studying journalism at the Institut national du sport et de l'éducation physique (National Institute of Sport and Physical Education).

In 2024 she was part of the Summer Paralympics opening ceremony, carrying the torch during its journey from Place de la Concorde to the Paralympics cauldron at the Tuileries Garden.
