= Volha Zinkevich =

Belarusian Paralympic athlete

Medal record

Track and field (athletics)

Representing Belarus

Paralympic Games
Gold medal – first place	2000 Sydney	200m – T12
Gold medal – first place	2004 Athens	Long jump – F12
Silver medal – second place	2004 Athens	100m – T12
Silver medal – second place	2004 Athens	200m – T12
Silver medal – second place	2008 Beijing	Long jump – F12
Bronze medal – third place	2000 Sydney	Long jump – F12

IPC Athletics European Championships
Bronze medal – third place	2012 Stadskanaal	200m T12

Volha Zinkevich (Belarusian: Вольга Зінкевіч; born 8 September 1975) is a Paralympian athlete from Belarus competing mainly in category F12 long jump events.

She competed in the 2000 Summer Paralympics in Sydney, Australia under the name Volha Shuliakouskaya. There she competed in the T12 100m, the F12 long jump winning a bronze medal and the T12 200m where she won the gold medal. In 2004 in Athens, Greece she competed in the 400m, won silver medals in both the T12 100m and 200m and won a gold medal in the F12 long jump. Four years later in Beijing, China she was not as successful, failing to win a medal in the T12 100m, 200m or 400m but did manage to win a silver in the F12 long jump.
