= Paraskevi Kantza =

Greek paralympic athlete (born 1976)

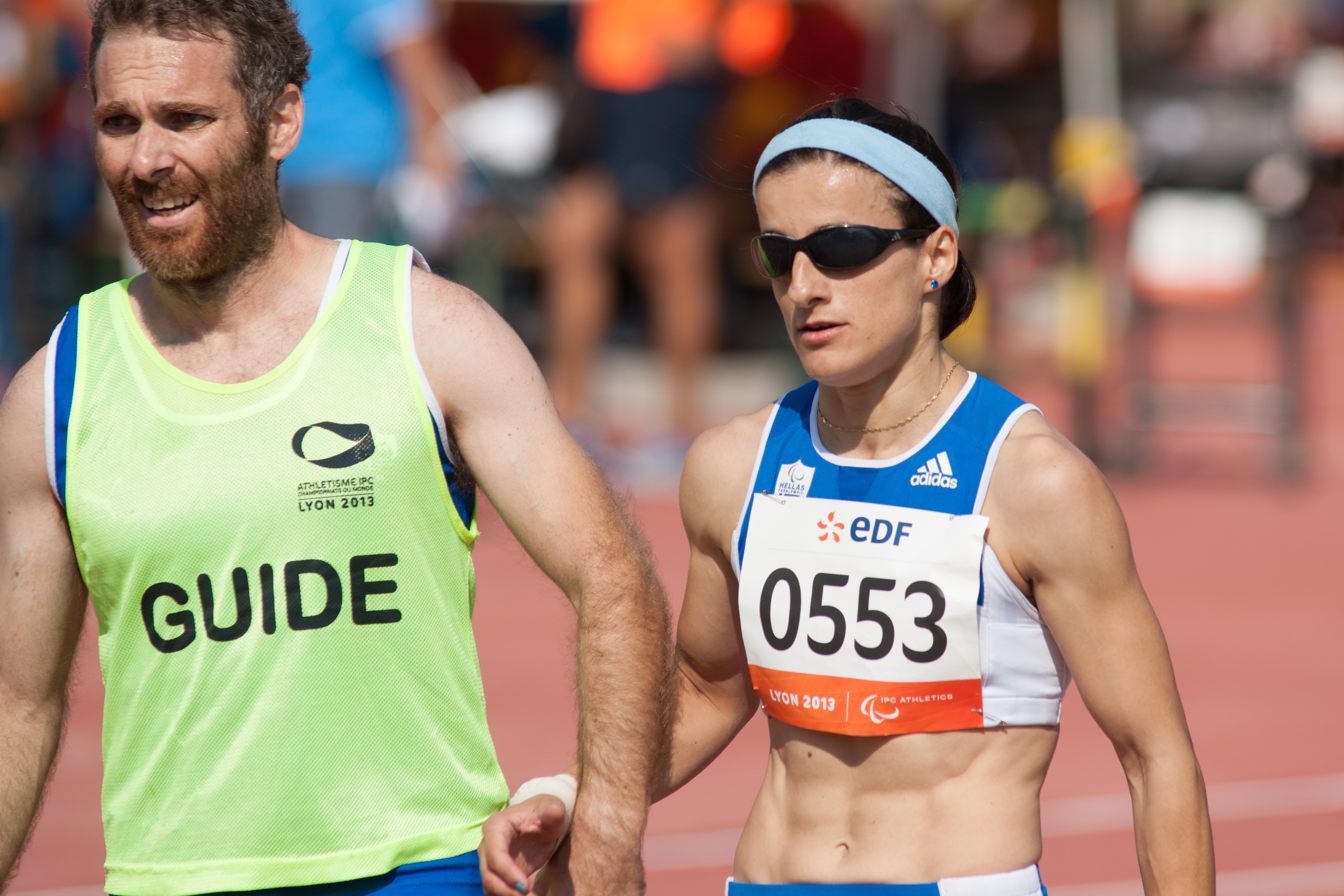
- Paraskevi Kantza at the 2013 IPC Athletics World Championships

Personal information
- Nationality: Greek
- Born: 8 August 1976 (age 49) Agrinio, Greece
- Height: 158 cm (5 ft 2 in)
- Weight: 54 kg (119 lb)

Sport
- Country: Greece
- Sport: Paralympic athletics
- Event(s): sprint, long jump
- Club: S.C.B. Ifaistos Thessaloniki
- Coached by: Theodoros Katsonopoulos
Medal record
Women's para athletics
Representing Greece
Paralympic Games
Bronze medal – third place	2004 Athens	100 metres - T11
World Championships
Silver medal – second place	2011 Christchurch	Long jump - T11
Silver medal – second place	2013 Lyon	Long jump - T11
European Championships
Silver medal – second place	2012 Stadskanaal	100m - T11

Paraskevi Kantza (born 8 August 1976) is a paralympic athlete from Greece competing mainly in category T11 sprint events and the long jump.

Paraskevi has competed in three Paralympics competing in the T11 100m, 200m and long jump. Her first games were the 2004 Summer Paralympics in her home country where she won a bronze in the 100m. She was unable to match this in Beijing in the 2008 Summer Paralympics and in London in 2012 Summer Paralympics where she failed to win any medals.

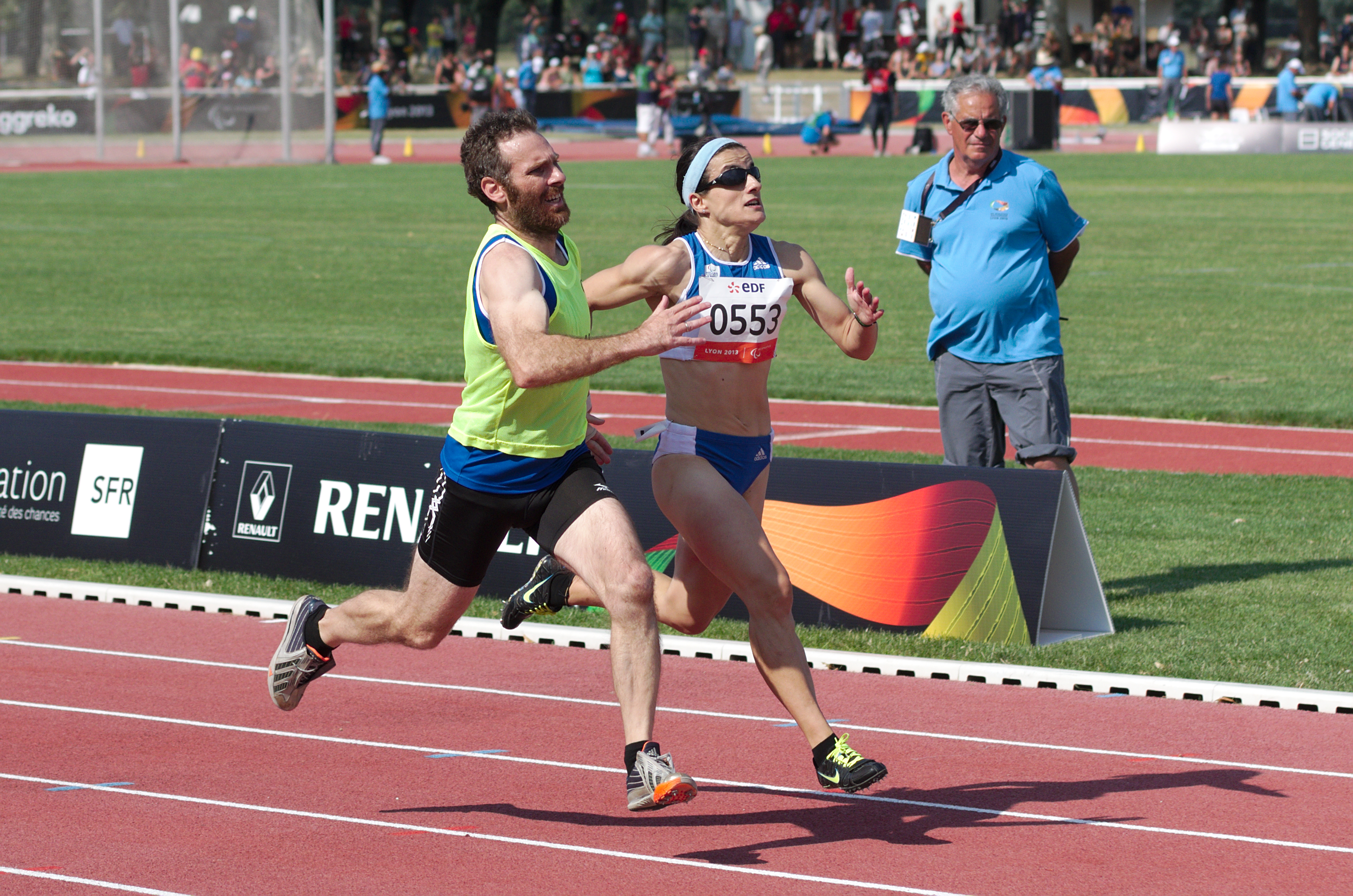
Paraskevi Kantza and Theodoros Katsonopoulos at the 2013 World Championships

She was awarded as the Best Greek female athlete with a disability for 2013.
