= Athletics at the 2012 Summer Paralympics – Women's 200 metres =

The Women's 200m athletics events for the 2012 Summer Paralympics took place at the London Olympic Stadium from August 31 to September 8. A total of 11 events were contested over this distance for 11 different classifications.

== Results ==
=== T11 ===
The T11 category is for athletes with a visual impairment. A T11 athlete may be entirely without sight, or be able to perceive light, but have no ability to see the shape of a hand at any distance. T11 athletes commonly run with guides.

The event consisted of 4 heats, 2 semifinals and a final. Results of final:

Rank	Athlete	Country	Time	Notes
1st place, gold medalist(s)	Terezinha Guilhermina; Guide: Guilherme Soares de Santana	Brazil	24.82	PR
2nd place, silver medalist(s)	Jerusa Geber Santos; Guide: Luiz Henrique Barboza Da Silva	Brazil	26.32	
3rd place, bronze medalist(s)	Jia Juntingxian; Guide: Xu Donglin	China	26.33	
4	Jhulia Santos; Guide: Fabio Dias de Oliveira Silva	Brazil	26.65	PB
			Wind: +0.4 m/s	

=== T12 ===
The T12 category is for athletes with visual impairment. Athletes in this category will generally have some residual sight, the ability to recognise the shape of a hand at a distance of 2 metres and the ability to perceive clearly will be no more than 2/60. T12 athletes commonly run with guides.

The event consisted of 3 heats and a final. Results of final:

Rank	Athlete	Country	Time	Notes
1st place, gold medalist(s)	Assia El Hannouni; Guide: Gautier Simounet	France	24.46	WR
2nd place, silver medalist(s)	Zhou Guohua; Guide: Li Jie	China	24.66	RR
3rd place, bronze medalist(s)	Zhu Daqing; Guide: Zhang Hui	China	24.88	
4	Oxana Boturchuk	Ukraine	24.92	PB
			Wind: +0.3 m/s	

=== T34 ===
The T34 category is for wheelchair athletes with cerebral palsy. Athletes in this category have minimal limitations or control problems in their arms and trunk while pushing a wheelchair.

The event consisted of 2 heats and a final. Results of final:

Rank	Athlete	Country	Class	Time	Notes
1st place, gold medalist(s)	Hannah Cockroft	Great Britain	T34	31.90	PR
2nd place, silver medalist(s)	Amy Siemons	Netherlands	T34	34.16	
3rd place, bronze medalist(s)	Desiree Vranken	Netherlands	T34	34.85	PB
4	Rosemary Little	Australia	T34	35.08	
5	Yousra Ben Jemaa	Tunisia	T34	37.68	
6	Rachael Burrows	Canada	T34	38.51	
7	Melissa Nicholls	Great Britain	T34	40.00	
8	Carleigh Dewald	United States	T34	41.53	
				Wind: +0.7 m/s	

=== T35 ===
The T35 category is for ambulant athletes with cerebral palsy. The typical T35 athlete may need assistive devices for walking. The athlete may have sufficient function to run but demonstrates poor balance.

The event consisted of a single race. Results:

Rank	Athlete	Country	Time	Notes
1st place, gold medalist(s)	Liu Ping	China	32.72	
2nd place, silver medalist(s)	Oxana Corso	Italy	33.68	RR
3rd place, bronze medalist(s)	Virginia McLachlan	Canada	34.31	RR
4	Sophia Warner	Great Britain	35.25	PB
5	Anna Luxova	Czech Republic	35.43	PB
6	Erinn Walters	Australia	36.31	
7	Rachael Dodds	Australia	36.75	
8	Fatima Del Rocio Perez Garcia	Mexico	37.60	
			Wind: Nil	

=== T36 ===
The T36 category is for ambulant athletes with cerebral palsy. These athletes do not have the capacity to remain still and they show involuntary movements with all four limbs affected. They usually walk without assistive devices.

The event consisted of 2 heats and a final. Results of final:

Rank	Athlete	Country	Time	Notes
1st place, gold medalist(s)	Elena Ivanova	Russia	30.25	
2nd place, silver medalist(s)	Jeon Min-jae	South Korea	31.08	
3rd place, bronze medalist(s)	Claudia Nicoleitzik	Germany	32.08	
4	Hazel Robson	Great Britain	32.46	
5	Yuki Kato	Japan	33.41	
6	Yu Chun Lai	Hong Kong	35.32	
	Yanina Andrea Martinez	Argentina	DQ	
	Nadia Schaus	Argentina	DQ	
			Wind: Nil	

=== T37 ===
The T37 category is for ambulant athletes with cerebral palsy. These athletes have movement and coordination problems on one half of their body. They have good ability in their dominant side of their body (ie hemiplegia).

The event consisted of 2 heats and a final. Results of final:

Rank	Athlete	Country	Time	Notes
1st place, gold medalist(s)	Johanna Benson	Namibia	29.26	
2nd place, silver medalist(s)	Bethany Woodward	Great Britain	29.65	
3rd place, bronze medalist(s)	Maria Seifert	Germany	29.86	
4	Oksana Krechunyak	Ukraine	29.89	
5	Jenny McLoughlin	Great Britain	30.08	
6	Viktoriya Kravchenko	Ukraine	30.09	
7	Neda Bahi	Tunisia	30.28	
8	Maryna Snisar	Ukraine	30.76	
			Wind:	

=== T38 ===
The T38 category is for ambulant athletes with cerebral palsy. T38 athletes have the mildest form of impairment caused by cerebral palsy, often in only one limb, and not affecting the ability to run, walk or jump freely, although impairing performance. T38 athletes may suffer minor co-ordination difficulties.

The event consisted of 2 heats and a final. Results of final:

Rank	Athlete	Country	Time	Notes
1st place, gold medalist(s)	Chen Junfei	China	27.39	WR
2nd place, silver medalist(s)	Margarita Goncharova	Russia	27.82	PB
3rd place, bronze medalist(s)	Inna Stryzhak	Ukraine	28.18	PB
4	Xiong Dezhi	China	28.62	PB
5	Tamira Slaby	Germany	29.14	
6	Sonia Mansour	Tunisia	29.32	
7	Torita Isaac	Australia	29.78	
8	Olivia Breen	Great Britain	30.22	
			Wind: -0.7 m/s	

=== T44 ===
The T44 category is for athletes who have a single below knee amputation or who can walk with moderately reduced function in one or both legs.

The event consisted of 2 heats and a final. Results of final:

Rank	Athlete	Country	Class	Time	Notes
1st place, gold medalist(s)	Marlou van Rhijn	Netherlands	T43	26.18	WR
2nd place, silver medalist(s)	Marie-Amelie le Fur	France	T44	26.76	WR
3rd place, bronze medalist(s)	Katrin Green	Germany	T44	27.53	PB
4	Stef Reid	Great Britain	T44	28.62	PB
5	Suzan Verduijn	Netherlands	T44	28.74	PB
6	Sophie Kamlish	Great Britain	T44	29.08	PB
7	Saki Takakuwa	Japan	T44	29.71	
	April Holmes	United States	T44	DNS	
				Wind: +1.0 m/s	

=== T46 ===
The T46 category is for athletes who have a single above or below elbow amputation or similar disability, with normal function in both legs.

The event consisted of 2 heats and a final. Results of final:

Rank	Athlete	Country	Time	Notes
1st place, gold medalist(s)	Yunidis Castillo	Cuba	24.45	WR
2nd place, silver medalist(s)	Alicja Fiodorow	Poland	25.49	RR
3rd place, bronze medalist(s)	Anrune Liebenberg	South Africa	25.55	RR
4	Nikol Rodomakina	Russia	25.56	PB
5	Wang Yanping	China	26.38	RR
6	Unyime Uwak	Nigeria	26.65	=PB
7	Katarzyna Piekart	Poland	27.18	PB
8	Alexandra Moguchaya	Russia	27.47	PB
			Wind: -0.6 m/s	

=== T52 ===
The T52 category is for wheelchair athletes with damage to spinal cord in the higher parts of the back, substantially impaired or no trunk function, and minimal or no leg function. Pushing power comes from elbow extensions, and appears close to normal except for use of modified gloves to compensate for grip.

The event consisted of a single race. Results:

Rank	Athlete	Country	Time	Notes
1st place, gold medalist(s)	Michelle Stilwell	Canada	33.80	PR
2nd place, silver medalist(s)	Marieke Vervoort	Belgium	34.83	RR
3rd place, bronze medalist(s)	Kerry Morgan	United States	36.49	
4	Cassie Mitchell	United States	37.75	PB
5	Teruyo Tanaka	Japan	39.04	SB
6	Yuka Kiyama	Japan	41.56	SB
7	Cheryl Leitner	United States	42.62	
			Wind: -0.3 m/s	

=== T53 ===
The T53 category is for wheelchair athletes with normal use of arms and hands, no or limited trunk function, and no leg function.

The event consisted of a single race. Results:

Rank	Athlete	Country	Time	Notes
1st place, gold medalist(s)	Huang Lisha	China	29.18	PB
2nd place, silver medalist(s)	Angela Ballard	Australia	29.35	RR
3rd place, bronze medalist(s)	Zhou Hongzhuan	China	29.40	PB
4	Jessica Galli	United States	29.82	
5	Anjali Forber Pratt	United States	30.27	
6	Madison de Rozario	Australia	30.33	PB
7	Anita Fordjour	Ghana	34.31	RR
8	Jessica Cooper Lewis	Bermuda	34.76	
			Wind: +0.7 m/s	
