= Athletics at the 2004 Summer Paralympics – Women's long jump F42–46 =

Women's long jump events for amputee athletes were held at the 2004 Summer Paralympics in the Athens Olympic Stadium. Events were held in two disability classes.

== F42 ==
Women's Long Jump F42 at the XII Paralympic Games
- Venue: Athens Olympic Stadium
- Dates: 20 September 2004
- Competitors: 11 from 7 nations
- Winning distance: 3.67

Medalists
1st place, gold medalist(s)		Zhang Hai Yuan	China
2nd place, silver medalist(s)		Christine Wolf	Germany
3rd place, bronze medalist(s)		Perla Bustamante	Mexico

The F42 event was won by Zhang Hai Yuan, representing China.

20 Sept. 2004, 19:45

Rank	Athlete	Result	Notes
1st place, gold medalist(s)	Zhang Hai Yuan (CHN)	3.67	WR
2nd place, silver medalist(s)	Christine Wolf (GER)	3.53	
3rd place, bronze medalist(s)	Perla Bustamante (MEX)	3.44	
4	Ewa Zielinska (POL)	3.38	
5	Annette Roozen (NED)	3.33	
6	Elin Holen (NOR)	3.29	
7	Gui Yu Na (CHN)	3.25	
8	Marije Smits (NED)	3.19	
9	Salome Kretz (GER)	2.98	
10	Carine Swanepoel (RSA)	2.82	
	Claudia Biene (GER)	DNS	

== F44/46 ==
Women's Long Jump F44/46 at the XII Paralympic Games
- Venue: Athens Olympic Stadium
- Dates: 20 September 2004
- Competitors: 13 from 10 nations
- Winning distance: 5.02

Medalists
1st place, gold medalist(s)		Andrea Scherney	Austria
2nd place, silver medalist(s)		Wang Juan	China
3rd place, bronze medalist(s)		April Holmes	United States

The F44/46 event was won by Andrea Scherney, representing Austria.

20 Sept. 2004, 10:30

Rank	Athlete	Result	Points	Notes
1st place, gold medalist(s)	Andrea Scherney (AUT)	5.02	1248	WR
2nd place, silver medalist(s)	Wang Juan (CHN)	4.59	1141	
3rd place, bronze medalist(s)	April Holmes (USA)	4.56	1134	
4	Thouraya Gharbi (TUN)	4.32	1074	
5	Sabine Wagner (GER)	4.28	1064	
6	Iryna Leantsiuk (BLR)	5.71	1045	PR
7	Katrin Laborenz (GER)	4.20	1044	
8	Andrea Holmes (CAN)	4.16	1034	
9	Mami Sato (JPN)	3.95	982	
10	Astrid Höfte (GER)	3.84	955	
11	Ou Yang Jing Ling (CHN)	5.07	928	
12	Giuliana Cum (ITA)	3.62	900	
13	Yunidis Castillo (CUB)	4.90	897	
