= Athletics at the 2008 Summer Paralympics – Women's 100 metres T44 =

Women's 100m T44 at the XIII Paralympic Games
- Venue: Beijing National Stadium
- Dates: 14 September
- Competitors: 11 from 10 nations
- Winning time: 13.72

Medalists
1st place, gold medalist(s)		April Holmes	United States
2nd place, silver medalist(s)		Marie-Amelie le Fur	France
3rd place, bronze medalist(s)		Wang Juan	China

The women's 100m T44 event at the 2008 Summer Paralympics took place at the Beijing National Stadium on 14 September. There were two heats; the first 3 in each heat (Q) plus the 2 fastest other times (q) qualified.

== Results ==
=== Heats ===
Competed from 10:35.

==== Heat 1 ====
Rank	Name	Nationality	Time	Notes
1	Katrin Green	Germany	13.71	Q
2	Wang Juan	China	13.75	Q
3	Marie-Amelie le Fur	France	13.82	Q
4	Maya Nakanishi	Japan	13.93	q
5	Kate Horan	New Zealand	14.04	q
6	Sarisa Marais	South Africa	15.19	

==== Heat 2 ====
Rank	Name	Nationality	Time	Notes
1	April Holmes	United States	13.76	Q
2	Astrid Hofte	Germany	14.46	Q
3	Andrea Scherney	Austria	14.49	Q
4	Stefanie Reid	Canada	14.53	
5	Giuseppina Gargano	Italy	14.68	

=== Final ===
Competed at 17:33.

Rank	Name	Nationality	Time	Notes
1st place, gold medalist(s)	April Holmes	United States	13.72	
2nd place, silver medalist(s)	Marie-Amelie le Fur	France	13.73	
3rd place, bronze medalist(s)	Wang Juan	China	13.73	
4	Katrin Green	Germany	13.74	
5	Kate Horan	New Zealand	14.01	
6	Maya Nakanishi	Japan	14.24	
7	Astrid Hofte	Germany	14.47	
8	Andrea Scherney	Austria	14.48	

Q = qualified for final by place. q = qualified by time.
