= Netherlands at the 2012 Summer Paralympics =

- Flag of the Netherlands
- IPC code: NED
- NPC: Nederlands Olympisch Comité * Nederlandse Sport Federatie
- Website: paralympisch.nl (in Dutch)

in London
- Competitors: 91 in 11 sports
- Flag bearer: Ronald Hertog
- Medals Ranked 10th: Gold 10 Silver 10 Bronze 19 Total 39

Summer Paralympics appearances (overview)
- 1960; 1964; 1968; 1972; 1976; 1980; 1984; 1988; 1992; 1996; 2000; 2004; 2008; 2012; 2016; 2020; 2024

The Netherlands competed at the 2012 Summer Paralympics in London, United Kingdom, from 29 August to 9 September 2012.

== Medalists ==
Medal	Name	Sport	Event	Date
Gold	Marc Evers	Swimming	Men's 100 m backstroke (S14)	31 August
Gold	Kelly van Zon	Table tennis	Women's individual (Class 7)	3 September
Gold	Michael Schoenmaker	Swimming	Men's 50 m breaststroke (SB3)	3 September
Gold	Mirjam de Koning-Peper	Swimming	Women's 50 m freestyle (S6)	4 September
Gold	Kathrin Goeken	Cycling	Women's road time trial (B)	5 September
Gold	Mischa Rossen; Marcel van de Veen; Udo Hessels	Sailing	Open three-person keelboat – Sonar	6 September
Gold	Lisette Teunissen	Swimming	Women's 50 m backstroke (S4)	6 September
Gold	Marlou van Rhijn	Athletics	Women's 200 m (T44)	6 September
Gold	Esther Vergeer	Wheelchair tennis	Women's singles	7 September
Gold	Esther Vergeer; Marjolein Buis	Wheelchair tennis	Women's doubles	8 September
Silver	Amy Siemons	Athletics	Women's 100 m (T34)	31 August
Silver	Alyda Norbruis	Cycling	Women's time trial (C1-3)	1 September
Silver	Marlou van Rhijn	Athletics	Women's 100 m (T44)	2 September
Silver	Maurice Deelen	Swimming	Men's 50 m freestyle (S8)	3 September
Silver	Magda Toeters	Swimming	Women's 100 m breaststroke (SB14)	6 September
Silver	Amy Siemons	Athletics	Women's 200 m (T34)	6 September
Silver	Aniek van Koot	Wheelchair tennis	Women's singles	7 September
Silver	Laura de Vaan	Cycling	Women's road race (H4)	7 September
Silver	Kenny van Weeghel	Athletics	Men's 400 m (T54)	7 September
Silver	Jiske Griffioen; Aniek van Koot	Wheelchair tennis	Women's doubles	8 September
Bronze	Mirjam de Koning-Peper	Swimming	Women's 100 m backstroke (S6)	30 August
Bronze	Marlou van der Kulk	Swimming	Women's 100 m backstroke (S14)	31 August
Bronze	Rinne Oost	Cycling	Men's time trial (B)	1 September
Bronze	Maurice Deelen	Swimming	Men's 100 m breaststroke (SB8)	1 September
Bronze	Lisa den Braber	Swimming	Women's 100 m breaststroke (SB7)	1 September
Bronze	Frank Hosmar	Equestrian	Individual championship test (Grade IV)	2 September
Bronze	Gerben Last	Table tennis	Men's individual (Class 9)	2 September
Bronze	Marlou van der Kulk	Swimming	Women's 200 m freestyle (S14)	2 September
Bronze	Ronald Hertog	Athletics	Men's javelin throw (F44)	2 September
Bronze	Frank Hosmar	Equestrian	Individual freestyle test (Grade IV)	4 September
Bronze	Laura de Vaan	Cycling	Women's road time trial (H4)	5 September
Bronze	Maurice Deelen	Swimming	Men's 200 m individual medley (SM8)	5 September
Bronze	Thierry Schmitter	Sailing	One person keelboat – 2.4 m	6 September
Bronze	Jiske Griffioen	Wheelchair tennis	Women's singles	6 September
Bronze	Marc Evers	Swimming	Men's 100 m breaststroke (SB14)	6 September
Bronze	Desiree Vranken	Athletics	Women's 200 m (T34)	6 September
Bronze	Netherlands women's national wheelchair basketball team: Inge Huitzing; Lucie Houwen; Jitske Visser; Roos Oosterbaan; Sanne Timmerman; Petra Garnier; Miranda Wevers; Cher Korver; Saskia Pronk; Barbara van Bergen; Carolina de Rooij-Versloot; Mariska Beijer	Wheelchair basketball	Women's tournament	7 September
Bronze	Kathrin Goeken	Cycling	Women's road race (B)	8 September
Bronze	Ronald Vink	Wheelchair tennis	Men's singles	8 September

Medals by sport
Sport	1	2	3	Total
Swimming	4	2	7	13
Wheelchair tennis	2	2	2	6
Athletics	1	4	2	7
Cycling	1	2	3	6
Sailing	1	0	1	2
Table tennis	1	0	1	2
Equestrian	0	0	2	2
Wheelchair basketball	0	0	1	1

Medals by date
Day	Date	1	2	3	Total
Day 1	30 August	0	0	1	1
Day 2	31 August	1	1	1	3
Day 3	1 September	0	1	3	4
Day 4	2 September	0	1	4	5
Day 5	3 September	2	1	0	3
Day 6	4 September	1	0	1	2
Day 7	5 September	1	0	2	3
Day 8	6 September	3	2	4	9
Day 9	7 September	1	3	1	5
Day 10	8 September	1	1	2	4
Day 11	9 September	0	0	0	0
Total		10	10	19	39

== Archery ==
Men

Athlete	Event	Ranking round		Round of 32	Round of 16	Quarterfinals	Semifinals	Finals	
Athlete	Event	Score	Seed	Opposition score	Opposition score	Opposition score	Opposition score	Opposition score	Rank
Johan Wildeboer	Ind. recurve W1/W2	588	13	Wolfe (USA); L 0–6	Did not advance				

== Athletics ==
Men–track

Athlete	Events	Heat		Final	
Athlete	Events	Time	Rank	Time	Rank
Henk Schuiling	T34 200 m	31.10 PB	10	Did not advance	
Henk Schuiling	T34 100 m	17.18	7 Q	17.32	7
Stefan Rusch	T34 100 m	16.79	4 Q	16.74 PB	6
Stefan Rusch	T34 200 m	30.57	7 q	30.63	6
Jelmar Bos	T37 100 m	12.23	14	Did not advance	
Kenny van Weeghel	T54 100 m	14.21	6 q	14.87	8
Kenny van Weeghel	T54 400 m	48.06	3	47.12 PB	2nd place, silver medalist(s)

Women–track

Athlete	Events	Heat		Final	
Athlete	Events	Time	Rank	Time	Rank
Amy Siemons	T34 200 m	34.88	3 Q	34.16	2nd place, silver medalist(s)
Amy Siemons	T34 100 m	19.94	2 Q	19.49	2nd place, silver medalist(s)
Desiree Vranken	T34 100 m	20.69	5 q	20.37	4
Desiree Vranken	T34 200 m	35.56	4 Q	34.85 PB	3rd place, bronze medalist(s)
Marije Smits	T42 100 m	—N/a		18.28	8
Marlou van Rhijn	T44 100 m	13.27 WR(T43)	1 Q	13.32	2nd place, silver medalist(s)
Marlou van Rhijn	T44 200 m	26.97 WR(T43)	1 Q	26.18 WR(T43)	1st place, gold medalist(s)
Suzan Verduijn	T44 100 m	14.45 SB	9	Did not advance	
Suzan Verduijn	T44 200 m	28.92 PB	5 Q	28.74	5
Iris Pruysen	T44 100 m	14.87 PB	11	Did not advance	
Iris Pruysen	T44 200 m	DNS	-	Did not advance	

Men–field

Athlete	Events	Result	Rank
Ronald Hertog	Javelin throw F44	55.83 SB	3rd place, bronze medalist(s)

Women–field

Athlete	Events	Result	Rank
Marije Smits	Long jump F42–44	881 points / 3.59 meter	11
Suzan Verduijn	Long jump F42–44	912 points / 4.53 meter	10
Iris Pruysen	Long jump F42–44	976 points / 4.87 meter PB	4

== Cycling ==
=== Road ===
Men

Athlete	Event	Time	Rank
Rinne Oost (pilot: Patrick Bos)	B road race	2:29:47	8
Rinne Oost (pilot: Patrick Bos)	B time trial	32:33.72	12
Bastiaan Gruppen	C4-5 road race	2:02:09	21
Bastiaan Gruppen	C5 time trial	33:25.75	5
Jetze Plat	H4 road race	2:00:35	4
Jetze Plat	H4 time trial	27:40.50	8
Johan Reekers	H4 time trial	27:06.99	6
Johan Reekers	H4 road race	2:00:35	7

Women

Athlete	Event	Time	Rank
Joleen Hakker (pilot: Samantha van Steenis)	B road race	DNF	-
Joleen Hakker (pilot: Samantha van Steenis)	B time trial	37:27.87	9
Kathrin Goeken (pilot: Kim van Dijk)	B time trial	35:02.73	1st place, gold medalist(s)
Kathrin Goeken (pilot: Kim van Dijk)	B road race	2:12:56	3rd place, bronze medalist(s)
Alyda Norbruis	C1-3 road race	DNS	
Alyda Norbruis	C1-3 time trial	DNS	
Laura de Vaan	H4 road race	1:41:21	2nd place, silver medalist(s)
Laura de Vaan	H4 time trial	30:24.82	3rd place, bronze medalist(s)

=== Track ===
Sprint

Athlete	Event	Qualification		Quarterfinals	Semifinals	Final	
Athlete	Event	Time	Rank	Opposition Result	Opposition Result	Opposition Result	Rank
Rinne Oost (pilot: Patrick Bos)	Men's B sprint	10.535	4	Tatsuyuki Oshiro; L 1–2	—N/a	5th/6th place Christos Stefanakis; W 12.581	5

Time trial

Athlete	Event	Time	Rank
Alyda Norbruis	Women's C1-3 time trial	39.174	2nd place, silver medalist(s)
Rinne Oost (pilot: Patrick Bos)	Men's B time trial	1:03.052	3rd place, bronze medalist(s)

Pursuit

Athlete	Event	Qualification		Final	
Athlete	Event	Time	Rank	Opponent Results	Rank
Alyda Norbruis	Women's C1-2-3 pursuit	4:30.507	5	Did not advance	

== Equestrian ==
Individual

Athlete	Horse	Event	Total	
Athlete	Horse	Event	Score	Rank
Petra van de Sande	Valencia Z	Championship grade II	74.476	4
Petra van de Sande	Valencia Z	Freestyle grade II	61.450	18
Gert Bolmer	Milano de Flore & Vorman	Championship grade II	70.143	7
Gert Bolmer	Milano de Flore & Vorman	Freestyle grade II	71.650	7
Sanne Voets	Carraig Dubh & Vedet PB	Championship grade III	68.767	5
Sanne Voets	Carraig Dubh & Vedet PB	Freestyle grade III	75.400	4
Frank Hosmar	Alphaville	Championship grade IV	73.097	3rd place, bronze medalist(s)
Frank Hosmar	Alphaville	Freestyle grade IV	78.600	3rd place, bronze medalist(s)

Team

Athlete	Horse	Event	Test round		Final round		Total	
Athlete	Horse	Event	Score	Rank	Score	Rank	Score	Rank
Petra van de Sande	See above	II team	68.095	6	74.476	4	428.253	4
Gert Bolmer	See above	II team	66.143	11	70.143	7	428.253	4
Sanne Voets	See above	III team	72.037	4	68.767	5	428.253	4
Frank Hosmar	See above	IV team	71.781	3	73.097	3	428.253	4

== Football 7-a-side ==
Group play

Pos	Team	Pld	W	D	L	GF	GA	GD	Pts	Qualification
1	Russia (RUS)	3	3	0	0	19	1	+18	9	Qualified for the medal round
2	Iran (IRI)	3	2	0	1	13	5	+8	6	Qualified for the medal round
3	Netherlands (NED)	3	1	0	2	5	13	−8	3	Qualified for the classification round
4	Argentina (ARG)	3	0	0	3	2	20	−18	0	Qualified for the classification round

2012-09-01
11:15

Netherlands	1–4	Iran
Straatman 52'	Report	Mehri 4'; Akbari 27'; Karimizadeh 30'; Ansari 60+6'

Riverbank Arena
Attendance: 4,405
Referee: Ross Haswell (GBR)

2012-09-03
16:15

Russia	8–0	Netherlands
Larionov 23'; Ramonov 30', 50', 54'; Van Altena 34' (o.g.); Murvanadze 36', 39'; Potekhin 60+3'	Report

Riverbank Arena
Attendance: 10,561
Referee: Kevin Wright (GBR)

2012-09-05
11:15

Argentina	1–4	Netherlands
Morana 6'	Report	Lokhoff 11', 54'; Visker 19', 45'

Riverbank Arena
Attendance: 4,405
Referee: Scott Henry (GBR)

5th–8th place semifinal

2012-09-07
9:00

Netherlands	5–0	United States
Straatman 16', 33'; Visker 35'; Swinkels 39' (pen.); Kooij 59'	Report

Riverbank Arena
Attendance: 3,848
Referee: Alex Kirkley (GBR)

5th/6th place match

2012-09-09
11:00

Netherlands	3–0	Argentina
Visker 9', 12', 18'	Report

Riverbank Arena
Attendance: 7,490
Referee: Álvaro Azeredo Quelhas (BRA)

== Sailing ==
Athlete	Event	Race											Total points	Rank
Athlete	Event	1	2	3	4	5	6	7	8	9	10	11	Total points	Rank
Thierry Schmitter	2.4 mR – 1 person keelboat	5	2	1	6	6	(10)	4	6	1	6	X	37	3rd place, bronze medalist(s)
Udo Hessels; Mischa Rossen; Marcel van de Veen	Sonar – 3 person keelboat	(8)	2	2	1	1	3	3	2	1	5	X	20	1st place, gold medalist(s)

X = Due to a lack of wind sailing was cancelled.

== Swimming ==
Men

Athlete	Events	Heats		Final	
Athlete	Events	Time	Rank	Time	Rank
Michael Schoenmaker	S4 50 m freestyle	43.01	9	Did not advance	
Michael Schoenmaker	S4 100 m freestyle	1:30.23	8 Q	1:28.63	8
Michael Schoenmaker	S4 200 m freestyle	3:14.16	7 Q	3:12.22	7
Michael Schoenmaker	SB3 50 m breaststroke	51.39	3 Q	50.00	1st place, gold medalist(s)
Michael Schoenmaker	SM4 150 m individual medley	DSQ	-	Did not advance	
Maurice Deelen	S8 50 m freestyle	26.48	2 Q	26.29	2nd place, silver medalist(s)
Maurice Deelen	S8 100 m freestyle	59.88	4 Q	58.65	4
Maurice Deelen	SB8 100 m breaststroke	1:11.02	2 Q	1:11.09	3rd place, bronze medalist(s)
Maurice Deelen	SM8 200 m individual medley	2:27.44	1 Q	2:27.17	3rd place, bronze medalist(s)
Mike van der Zanden	S10 400 m freestyle	4:21.12	10	Did not advance	
Mike van der Zanden	S10 100 m butterfly	59.00	5 Q	59.39	6
Michel Tielbeke	SB12 100 m breaststroke	1:12.93; Swim Off; 1:11.60	=8	Did not advance	
Marc Evers	S14 200 m freestyle	2:03.03	6 Q	2:00.76	4
Marc Evers	S14 100 m backstroke	1:03.42	5 Q	1:01.85	1st place, gold medalist(s)
Marc Evers	SB14 100 m breaststroke	1:08.46	3 Q	1:08.43	3rd place, bronze medalist(s)

Women

Athlete	Events	Heats		Final	
Athlete	Events	Time	Rank	Time	Rank
Lisette Teunissen	S5 50 m freestyle	46.63	8 Q	44.82 PB	8
Lisette Teunissen	S5 200 m freestyle	3:27.74	7 Q	3:22.67	7
Lisette Teunissen	S4 50 m backstroke	52.90	1 Q	51.51	1st place, gold medalist(s)
Mirjam de Koning-Peper	S6 50 m freestyle	35.05	1 Q	34.77 PR	1st place, gold medalist(s)
Mirjam de Koning-Peper	S6 100 m freestyle	DNS	-	Did not advance	
Mirjam de Koning-Peper	S6 400 m freestyle	5:44.63	3 Q	5:38.06	4
Mirjam de Koning-Peper	S6 100 m backstroke	1:29.86	3 Q	1:29.04	3rd place, bronze medalist(s)
Mirjam de Koning-Peper	SM6 200 m individual medley	DNS	-	Did not advance	
Lisa den Braber	SB7 100 m breaststroke	1:37.61	3 Q	1:37.02	3rd place, bronze medalist(s)
Lisa den Braber	S8 400 m freestyle	5:34.18	10	Did not advance	
Romy Pansters	S8 400 m freestyle	5:19.80	7 Q	5:30.71	8
Romy Pansters	S8 50 m freestyle	34.66	15	Did not advance	
Romy Pansters	S8 100 m freestyle	1:14.55	10	Did not advance	
Chantal Molenkamp	S10 100 m freestyle	1:06.52	11	Did not advance	
Chantal Molenkamp	S10 50 m freestyle	30.09	11	Did not advance	
Marije Oosterhuis	S10 50 m freestyle	30.24	=12	Did not advance	
Marije Oosterhuis	S10 400 m freestyle	5:03.80	10	Did not advance	
Marije Oosterhuis	S10 100 m backstroke	1:14.42	9	Did not advance	
Magda Toeters	SB14 100 m breaststroke	1:20.51	2 Q	1:20.64	2nd place, silver medalist(s)
Magda Toeters	S14 200 m freestyle	2:17.11	7 Q	2:17.70	7
Marlou van der Kulk	S14 200 m freestyle	2:14.43	2 Q	2:14.80	3rd place, bronze medalist(s)
Marlou van der Kulk	SB14 100 m breaststroke	1:23.45	5 Q	1:24.43	6
Marlou van der Kulk	S14 100 m backstroke	1:09.98	2 Q	1:09.50	3rd place, bronze medalist(s)

== Table tennis ==
Athlete	Event	Preliminaries		Quarterfinals	Semifinals	Finals	
Athlete	Event	Opposition Result	Rank	Opposition Result	Opposition Result	Opposition Result	Rank
Tonnie Heijnen	Men's singles class 9	Nozdrunov (RUS); L 1–3; Aulie (NOR); W 3–2	2	Did not advance			
Gerben Last	Men's singles class 9	BYE		Bouvais (FRA); W 3–1	Frączyk (AUT); L 2–3	Bronze medal match Cabestany (FRA); W 3–1	3rd place, bronze medalist(s)
Tonnie Heijnen; Gerben Last	Men's team class 9–10	Egypt (EGY); Abdelwahab / Youssef; W 3–2	—N/a	China (CHN); Ma L / Ge; L 0–3	Did not advance		
Wendy Schrijver	Women's singles class 7	Safonova (UKR); L 1–3; Mahmoud (EGY); W 3–1; Ovsyannikova (RUS); L 0–3	3	—N/a	Did not advance		
Kelly van Zon	Women's singles class 7	Munoz (ARG); W 3–1; Öçsoy (TUR); W 3–1; Barneoud (FRA); W 3–1	1	—N/a	Safonova (UKR); W 3–2	Ovsyannikova (RUS); W 3–1	1st place, gold medalist(s)
Wendy Schrijver; Kelly van Zon	Women's team class 6–10	Brazil (BRA); Alexandre / Rodrigues; L 2–3	—N/a	Did not advance			

== Volleyball ==
=== Women's tournament ===
Roster

The following is the Dutch roster in the women's volleyball tournament of the 2012 Summer Paralympics.

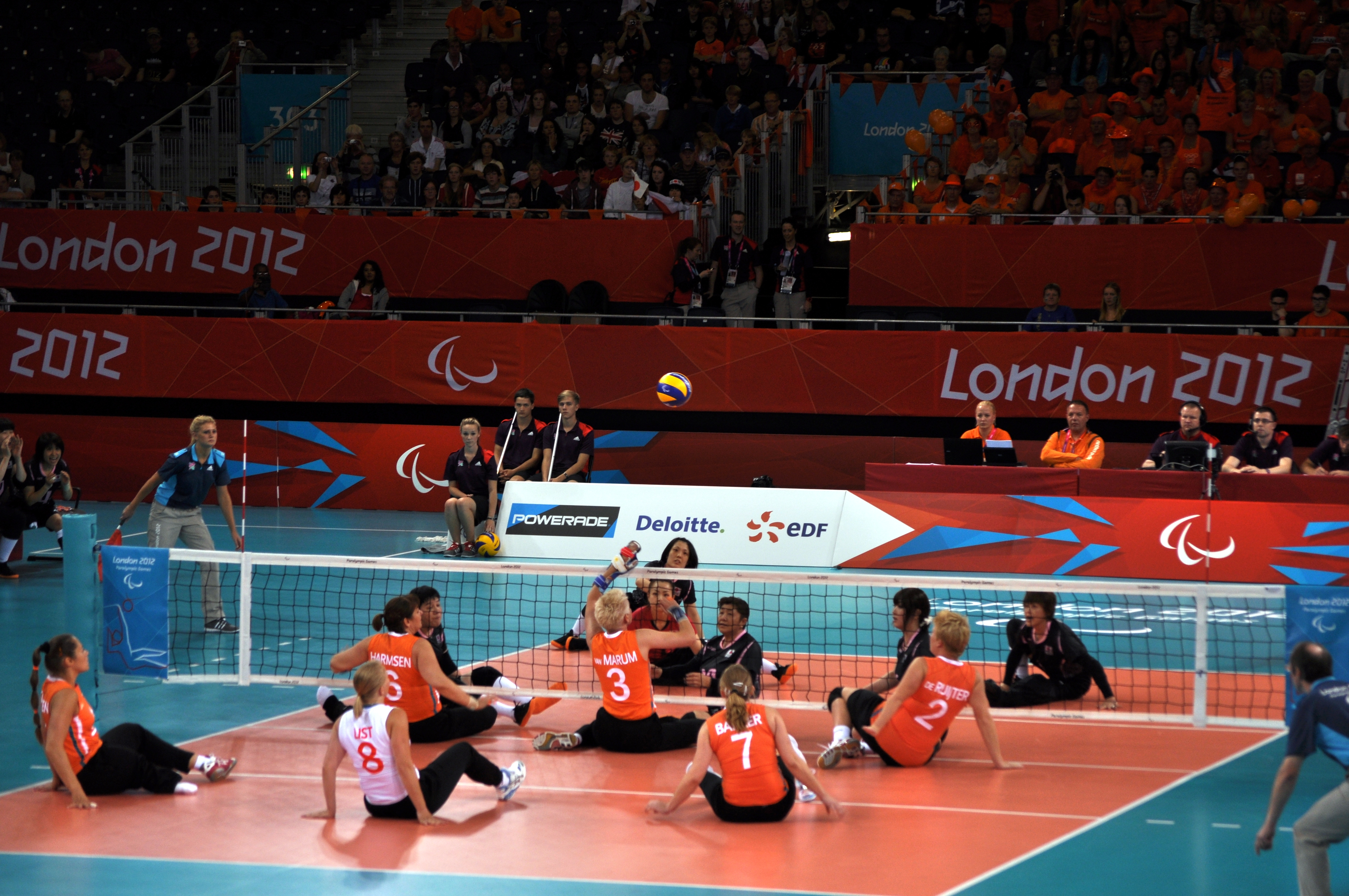
Dutch women's volleyball team

№	Name	Date of birth	Position	2012 club
1	Elvira Stinissen	26 March 1979		(Netherlands) Netwerk
2	Marieke de Ruijter	27 November 1988		(Netherlands) Netwerk
3	Djoke van Marum	22 September 1959		(Netherlands) Volleer
4	Rika de Vries	29 December 1974		(Netherlands) Kindercentrum/Alterno
5	Karin van der Haar	9 May 1977		(Netherlands) Sudosa/SC Bartje
6	Karin Harmsen	11 March 1962		(Netherlands) Volleer
7	Sanne Bakker	13 February 1992		(Netherlands) Surrey
8	Paula List	16 August 1972		(Netherlands) Allvo
9	Jolanda Slenter	15 June 1965		(Netherlands) Holyoke
12	Josien Ten Thije	24 December 1969		(Netherlands) Sudosa/SC Bartje
15	Anne Raben	17 May 1986		(Netherlands) Kindercentrum/Alterno

Group play

Pos	Team	Pld	W	L	Pts	SW	SL	SR	SPW	SPL	SPR
1	Ukraine	3	3	0	6	9	1	9.000	241	167	1.443
2	Netherlands	3	2	1	5	7	4	1.750	251	201	1.249
3	Japan	3	1	2	4	4	6	0.667	190	218	0.872
4	Great Britain	3	0	3	3	0	9	0.000	129	225	0.573

31 August 2012; 19:00	Netherlands	3–1	Japan	ExCeL London, London; Referees: Amin Al-Traifi (KSA), Dominik Raca (CRO)
31 August 2012; 19:00	(22–25, 25–18, 25–13, 25–14); Report			ExCeL London, London; Referees: Amin Al-Traifi (KSA), Dominik Raca (CRO)

1 September 2012; 16:00	Great Britain	0–3	Netherlands	ExCeL London, London; Referees: Mourad El-Baroudy (EGY), Xin Xia (CHN)
1 September 2012; 16:00	(13–25, 12–25, 15–25); Report			ExCeL London, London; Referees: Mourad El-Baroudy (EGY), Xin Xia (CHN)

2 September 2012; 11:00	Netherlands	1–3	Ukraine	ExCeL London, London; Referees: Jung Mal-Soon (KOR), Dimosthenis Kostopoulos (GRE)
2 September 2012; 11:00	(24–26, 25–15, 11–25, 19–25); Report			ExCeL London, London; Referees: Jung Mal-Soon (KOR), Dimosthenis Kostopoulos (GRE)

Semi-final

5 September 2012; 19:00	Netherlands	2–3	China	ExCeL London, London; Referees: Glynn Archibald (GBR), Sari Mannersuo (FIN)
5 September 2012; 19:00	(25–17, 14–25, 25–13, 16–25, 11–15); Report			ExCeL London, London; Referees: Glynn Archibald (GBR), Sari Mannersuo (FIN)

Bronze medal match

7 September 2012; 19:00	Ukraine	3–0	Netherlands	ExCeL London, London; Referees: Joe Campbell (GBR), France Marcoux (CAN)
7 September 2012; 19:00	(25–14, 25–21, 25–16); Report			ExCeL London, London; Referees: Joe Campbell (GBR), France Marcoux (CAN)

== Wheelchair basketball ==
The Netherlands qualified for the women's team event in wheelchair basketball by finishing fifth at the 2010 Wheelchair Basketball World Championship.

=== Women's tournament ===
Team	Pld	W	L	PF	PA	PD	Pts	Qualification
Australia	4	3	1	211	180	+31	7 (Note: head-to-head score differential: AUS: +2; NED: +2; CAN: −4) (Note: Netherlands and Australia have the same score difference but Australia won the match from the Netherlands (58–49))	Quarter-finals
Netherlands	4	3	1	236	194	+42	7	Quarter-finals
Canada	4	3	1	248	231	+17	7	Quarter-finals
Great Britain	4	1	3	151	217	−66	5	Quarter-finals
Brazil	4	0	4	190	214	−24	4	Eliminated

Rules for classification: 1) Table points, 2) Head-to-head score differential
Notes:

30 August 2012
13:00

Report

Netherlands	62–35	Great Britain
Scoring by quarter: 8–8, 12–6, 18–10, 24–11
Pts: Bejer 26; Rebs: Bejer 19; Asts: Huitzing 9		Pts: Conroy 15; Rebs: Freeman 12; Asts: Freeman 6

North Greenwich Arena, London
Referees: Max Kindervater (GER)

31 August 2012
19:00

Report

Canada	59–70	Netherlands
Scoring by quarter: 10–25, 17–9, 16–19, 16–17
Pts: McLachlan 26; Rebs: McLachlan 15; Asts: Harnock, Ferguson 5		Pts: Bejer 34; Rebs: Bejer 14; Asts: Huitzing 11

North Greenwich Arena, London
Referees: Adam Fronczak (POL)

2 September 2012
21:15

Report

Netherlands	49–58	Australia
Scoring by quarter: 12–18, 8–12, 9–10, 20–18
Pts: Huitzing 14; Rebs: Huitzing 8 Asts: Huitzing 7		Pts: Merritt 19; Rebs: Crispin 7 Asts: Chaplin 7

North Greenwich Arena, London
Referees: Darrell Hargreaves (USA)

3 September 2012
18:30

Report

Brazil	42–55	Netherlands
Scoring by quarter: 12–19, 12–9, 10–20, 8–7
Pts: Soares Martins 28; Rebs: Soares Martins 14; Asts: Guimarães da Costa 6		Pts: Beijer 27; Rebs: Beijer 12; Asts: Huitzing 7

Basketball Arena, London
Referees: Eisuke Kano (JPN)

Quarter-final

4 September 2012
15:15

Report

Netherlands	59–37	China
Scoring by quarter: 13–6, 8–13, 18–10, 20–8
Pts: Beijer 29; Rebs: Beijer 14; Asts: Huitzing 9		Pts: Fu 18; Rebs: Long 6 Asts: Fu 12

North Greenwich Arena, London
Referees: Mati Quintana (ARG)

Semi-final

6 September 2012
15:15

Report

Netherlands	46–49	Germany
Scoring by quarter: 8–12, 21–12, 8–12, 9–13
Pts: Huitzing 16; Rebs: Huitzing, Beijer 12; Asts: Huitzing 8		Pts: Mohnen 20; Rebs: Schünemann 8 Asts: Zeyen 6

North Greenwich Arena, London
Referees: Juan Uruñuela (ESP)

Bronze medal match

7 September 2012
19:00

Report

United States	47–71	Netherlands
Scoring by quarter: 16–16, 8–22, 13–22, 10–11
Pts: Murray 19; Rebs: Murray 6 Asts: Murray 4		Pts: Beijer 27; Rebs: Beijer 9 Asts: Huitzing 11

North Greenwich Arena, London
Referees: Rui Marques (BRA)

== Wheelchair tennis ==
Athlete	Event	Round of 64	Round of 32	Round of 16	Quarterfinals	Semifinals	Finals	
Athlete	Event	Opposition Result	Opposition Result	Opposition Result	Opposition Result	Opposition Result	Opposition Result	Rank
Robin Ammerlaan	Men's singles	Chabrecek (SVK); W 6–2, 6–1	Farkas (HUN); W 6–2, 6–1	Jeremiasz (FRA); L 6–4, 0–6, 3–6	Did not advance			
Tom Egberink	Men's singles	McCarroll (GBR); W 6–4, 6–3	Weekes (AUS); W 6–2, 6–2	Houdet (FRA); L 2–6, 2–6	Did not advance			
Maikel Scheffers	Men's singles	Kruszelnicki (POL); W 6–3, 6–1	Yusuf (NGR); W 6–2, 6–1	Cattanéo (FRA); W 6–0, 6–2	Reid (GBR); W 6–3, 6–3	Houdet (FRA); L 3–6, 2–6	Bronze medal match Vink (NED); L 6–4, 6–7, 4–6	4
Ronald Vink	Men's singles	Merngprom (THA); W 6–1, 6–2	Caverzaschi (ESP); W 6–1, 6–0	Kellerman (AUS); W 6–3, 6–2	Gérard (BEL); W 7–6, 2–6, 6–3	Kunieda (JPN); L 2–6, 2–6	Bronze medal match Scheffers (NED); W 4–6, 7–6, 6–4	3rd place, bronze medalist(s)
Marjolein Buis	Women's singles	—N/a	Techamaneewat (THA); W 6–2, 6–1	Soldan (USA); W 6–2, 6–0	Ellerbrock (GER); L 6–2, 5–7, 2–6	Did not advance		
Jiske Griffioen	Women's singles	—N/a	Mayara (BRA); W 6–2, 6–0	Montjane (RSA); W 6–2, 6–2	Shuker (GBR); W 6–4, 6–2	Vergeer (NED); L 0–6, 3–6	Bronze medal match Ellerbrock (GER); W 6–2, 7–6	3rd place, bronze medalist(s)
Aniek van Koot	Women's singles	—N/a	Manns (AUS); W 6–0, 6–0	Mardones (CHI); W 6–0, 6–0	Kamiji (JPN); W 7–6, 7–5	Ellerbrock (GER); W 7–5, 6–2	Vergeer (NED); L 0–6, 3–6	2nd place, silver medalist(s)
Esther Vergeer	Women's singles	—N/a	Domori (JPN); W 6–0, 6–0	Krüger (GER); W 6–0, 6–0	Khanthasit (THA); W 6–1, 6–0	Griffioen (NED); W 6–0, 6–3	van Koot (NED); W 6–0, 6–3	1st place, gold medalist(s)
Robin Ammerlaan; Ronald Vink	Men's doubles	—N/a	BYE	Brazil (BRA); Pommê / Santos; W 6–3, 6–0	Japan (JPN); Miki / Sanada; W 1–6, 6–2, 6–3	France (FRA); Cattanéo / Peifer; L 3–6, 2–6	Bronze medal match France (FRA); Houdet / Jérémiasz; L 0–6, 0–6	4
Tom Egberink; Maikel Scheffers	Men's doubles	—N/a	BYE	South Korea (KOR); Lee / Oh; W 6–3, 6–2	Sweden (SWE); Olsson / Vikstrom; L 3–6, 2–6	Did not advance		
Marjolein Buis; Esther Vergeer	Women's doubles	—N/a		BYE	Colombia (COL); Bernal Villalobos; Martinez Vega; W 6–0, 6–1	Thailand (THA); Khanthasit; Techamaneewat; W 6–0, 6–1	Netherlands (NED); Griffioen / van Koot; W 6–1, 6–3	1st place, gold medalist(s)
Jiske Griffioen; Aniek van Koot	Women's doubles	—N/a		BYE	South Korea (KOR); Hwang / Park J-Y; W 6–0, 6–2	Great Britain (GBR); Whiley / Shuker; W 6–4, 6–3	Netherlands (NED); Buis / Vergeer; L 1–6, 3–6	2nd place, silver medalist(s)

== See also ==
- Netherlands at the Paralympics
- Netherlands at the 2012 Summer Olympics
