= Athletics at the 2012 Summer Paralympics – Women's 100 metres T44 =

Women's 100 metres T44 at the XIV Paralympic Games
- Venue: London Olympic Stadium
- Dates: 1 and 2 September
- Competitors: 12 from 8 nations

Medalists
| 1st place, gold medalist(s) | | Marie-Amelie le Fur | France |
| 2nd place, silver medalist(s) | | Marlou van Rhijn | Netherlands |
| 3rd place, bronze medalist(s) | | April Holmes | United States |

Athletics at the 2012 Summer Paralympics
Classification
T/F11–13: Blind and visually impaired
T/F20: Intellectual disability
T/F31–38: Cerebral palsy
F40: Les Autres
T/F42–46: Amputees
T/F51–58: Spinal cord disability
Men T/F42–46
Track
100 m | T42 | T44 | T46
200 m | T42 | T44 | T46
400 m | T44 | T46
800 m | T46
1500 m | T46
4×100 m relay | T42-46
Road
Marathon | T46
Field
Long jump | F42-44 | F46
Triple jump | F46
High jump | F42 | F46
Shot put | F42-44 | F46
Discus throw | F42 | F44
Javelin throw | F42 | F44
Women T/F42–46
Track
100 m | T42 | T44 | T46
200 m | T44 | T46
400 m | T46
Field
Long jump | F42-44 | F46
Shot put | F42-44
Javelin throw | F46

The Women's 100 metres T44 event at the 2012 Summer Paralympics took place at the London Olympic Stadium on 1 and 2 September.

The T44 category is for athletes who have a single below knee amputation or who can walk with moderately reduced function in one or both legs.

== Results ==
=== Round 1 ===
Competed 1 September 2012 from 19:33. Qual. rule: first 3 in each heat (Q) plus the 2 fastest other times (q) qualified.

==== Heat 1 ====
| Rank | Athlete | Country | Class | Time | Notes |
|---|---|---|---|---|---|
| 1 | Marie-Amelie le Fur | France | T44 | 13.40 | Q |
| 2 | Katrin Green | Germany | T44 | 13.63 | Q, SB |
| 3 | Wang Juan | China | T44 | 13.88 | Q, PB |
| 4 | Sophie Kamlish | Great Britain | T44 | 14.11 | q |
| 5 | Suzan Verduijn | Netherlands | T44 | 14.45 | SB |
| 6 | Maya Nakanishi | Japan | T44 | 14.47 | |
| | | | | Wind: +0.1 m/s | |

==== Heat 2 ====
| Rank | Athlete | Country | Class | Time | Notes |
|---|---|---|---|---|---|
| 1 | Marlou van Rhijn | Netherlands | T43 | 13.27 | Q, WRC |
| 2 | April Holmes | United States | T44 | 13.58 | Q |
| 3 | Stef Reid | Great Britain | T44 | 13.98 | Q, SB |
| 4 | Saki Takakuwa | Japan | T44 | 14.06 | q, SB |
| 5 | Iris Pruysen | Netherlands | T44 | 14.87 | PB |
| 6 | Seng Hon Thin | Cambodia | T44 | 17.35 | SB |
| | | | | Wind: +0.3 m/s | |

=== Final ===
Competed 2 September 2012 at 21:32.

| Rank | Athlete | Country | Class | Time | Notes |
|---|---|---|---|---|---|
| 1st place, gold medalist(s) | Marie-Amelie le Fur | France | T44 | 13.26 | |
| 2nd place, silver medalist(s) | Marlou van Rhijn | Netherlands | T43 | 13.32 | |
| 3rd place, bronze medalist(s) | April Holmes | United States | T44 | 13.33 | SB |
| 4 | Katrin Green | Germany | T44 | 13.61 | SB |
| 5 | Sophie Kamlish | Great Britain | T44 | 13.98 | |
| 6 | Wang Juan | China | T44 | 14.11 | |
| 7 | Saki Takakuwa | Japan | T44 | 14.22 | |
| 8 | Stef Reid | Great Britain | T44 | 14.25 | |
| | | | | Wind: +0.4 m/s | |

Q = qualified by place. q = qualified by time. WRC = World Record for athlete's classification. PB = Personal Best. SB = Seasonal Best.
