= Athletics at the 2008 Summer Paralympics – Women's 200 metres T44 =

Women's 200m T44 at the XIII Paralympic Games
- Venue: Beijing National Stadium
- Dates: 9 September
- Competitors: 9 from 8 nations
- Winning time: 28.02

Medalists
1st place, gold medalist(s)		Katrin Green	Germany
2nd place, silver medalist(s)		Kate Horan	New Zealand
3rd place, bronze medalist(s)		Stefanie Reid	Canada

The women's 200m T44 event at the 2008 Summer Paralympics took place at the Beijing National Stadium on 9 September. There were no heats in this event.

== Final ==
Competed at 18:08.

Rank	Name	Nationality	Time	Notes
1st place, gold medalist(s)	Katrin Green	Germany	28.02	
2nd place, silver medalist(s)	Kate Horan	New Zealand	28.36	
3rd place, bronze medalist(s)	Stefanie Reid	Canada	28.85	
4	Maya Nakanishi	Japan	28.98	
5	Astrid Hofte	Germany	29.33	
6	Giuseppina Gargano	Italy	30.17	
7	Sarisa Marais	South Africa	30.41	
8	Marie-Amelie le Fur	France	31.09	
	April Holmes	United States		DQ

DQ = Disqualified.
