= Athletics at the 2012 Summer Paralympics – Women's 200 metres T44 =

Women's 200 metres T44 at the XIV Paralympic Games
- Venue: London Olympic Stadium
- Dates: 5 to 6 September
- Competitors: 10 from 9,000 nations
- Winning time: 26.18

Medalists
| 1st place, gold medalist(s) | | Marlou van Rhijn | Netherlands |
| 2nd place, silver medalist(s) | | Marie-Amelie le Fur | France |
| 3rd place, bronze medalist(s) | | Katrin Green | Germany |

Athletics at the 2012 Summer Paralympics
Classification
T/F11–13: Blind and visually impaired
T/F20: Intellectual disability
T/F31–38: Cerebral palsy
F40: Les Autres
T/F42–46: Amputees
T/F51–58: Spinal cord disability
Men T/F42–46
Track
100 m | T42 | T44 | T46
200 m | T42 | T44 | T46
400 m | T44 | T46
800 m | T46
1500 m | T46
4×100 m relay | T42-46
Road
Marathon | T46
Field
Long jump | F42-44 | F46
Triple jump | F46
High jump | F42 | F46
Shot put | F42-44 | F46
Discus throw | F42 | F44
Javelin throw | F42 | F44
Women T/F42–46
Track
100 m | T42 | T44 | T46
200 m | T44 | T46
400 m | T46
Field
Long jump | F42-44 | F46
Shot put | F42-44
Javelin throw | F46

The Women's 200 metres T44 event at the 2012 Summer Paralympics took place at the London Olympic Stadium from 5 to 6 September. The event consisted of 2 heats and a final.

The T44 category is for athletes who have a single below knee amputation or who can walk with moderately reduced function in one or both legs.

== Records ==
Prior to the competition, the existing World and Paralympic records were as follows:

| World record (T43) | Shea Cowart (USA) | 29.40 | 26 July 2002 | Villeneuve d'Ascq, France |
| World record (T44) | April Holmes (USA) | 27.10 | 12 July 2008 | Windsor, Canada |
| Paralympic record (T44) | April Holmes (USA) | 27.56 | 25 September 2004 | Athens, Greece |
Broken records during the 2012 Summer Paralympics
| World record (T43) | Marlou van Rhijn (NED) | 26.18 | 6 September 2012 | |
| World record (T44) | Marie-Amelie le Fur (FRA) | 26.76 | 6 September 2012 | |

== Results ==
=== Round 1 ===
Competed 5 September 2012 from 11:06. Qual. rule: first 3 in each heat (Q) plus the 2 fastest other times (q) qualified.

==== Heat 1 ====
| Rank | Athlete | Country | Class | Time | Notes |
|---|---|---|---|---|---|
| 1 | Marlou van Rhijn | Netherlands | T43 | 26.97 | Q |
| 2 | Katrin Green | Germany | T44 | 27.89 | Q |
| 3 | Sophie Kamlish | Great Britain | T44 | 29.62 | Q |
| 4 | Maya Nakanishi | Japan | T44 | 30.10 | |
| | Seng Hon Thin | Cambodia | T44 | DQ | |
| | | | | Wind: -0.7 m/s | |

==== Heat 2 ====
| Rank | Athlete | Country | Class | Time | Notes |
|---|---|---|---|---|---|
| 1 | Marie-Amelie le Fur | France | T44 | 27.49 | Q |
| 2 | April Holmes | United States | T44 | 28.49 | Q |
| 3 | Suzan Verduijn | Netherlands | T44 | 28.92 | Q |
| 4 | Stef Reid | Great Britain | T44 | 28.97 | q |
| 5 | Saki Takakuwa | Japan | T44 | 29.37 | q |
| | | | | Wind: Nil | |

=== Final ===
Competed 6 September 2012 at 20:48.

| Rank | Athlete | Country | Class | Time | Notes |
|---|---|---|---|---|---|
| 1st place, gold medalist(s) | Marlou van Rhijn | Netherlands | T43 | 26.18 | WR |
| 2nd place, silver medalist(s) | Marie-Amelie le Fur | France | T44 | 26.76 | WR |
| 3rd place, bronze medalist(s) | Katrin Green | Germany | T44 | 27.53 | PB |
| 4 | Stef Reid | Great Britain | T44 | 28.62 | PB |
| 5 | Suzan Verduijn | Netherlands | T44 | 28.74 | PB |
| 6 | Sophie Kamlish | Great Britain | T44 | 29.08 | PB |
| 7 | Saki Takakuwa | Japan | T44 | 29.71 | |
| | April Holmes | United States | T44 | DNS | |
| | | | | Wind: +1.0 m/s | |

Q = qualified by place. q = qualified by time. WR = World Record. PB = Personal Best. SB = Seasonal Best. DNS = Did not start.
