= Athletics at the 2008 Summer Paralympics – Women's long jump F44 =

Women's Long Jump F44 at the XIII Paralympic Games
- Venue: Beijing National Stadium
- Dates: 9 September
- Competitors: 6 from 6 nations
- Winning distance: 4.82

Medalists
1st place, gold medalist(s)		Andrea Scherney	Austria
2nd place, silver medalist(s)		Marie-Amelie le Fur	France
3rd place, bronze medalist(s)		Astrid Hofte	Germany

The women's long jump F44 event at the 2008 Summer Paralympics took place at the Beijing National Stadium at 09:30 AM on 9 September. There was a single round of competition, and since there were only six competitors, each had six jumps. The competition was won by Andrea Scherney, representing Austria.

== Results ==
Rank	Athlete	Nationality	1	2	3	4	5	6	Best	Notes
1st place, gold medalist(s)	Andrea Scherney	Austria	4.82	x	4.75	4.73	x	x	4.82	
2nd place, silver medalist(s)	Marie-Amelie le Fur	France	x	x	4.41	4.64	x	4.71	4.71	
3rd place, bronze medalist(s)	Astrid Hofte	Germany	4.53	4.67	4.48	4.57	x	x	4.67	
4	Wang Juan	China	4.60	x	4.29	x	x	4.61	4.61	
5	Stefanie Reid	Canada	x	x	x	x	4.61	x	4.61	
6	Mami Sato	Japan	x	4.20	x	x	4.28	x	4.28	
	April Holmes	United States								DNS

DNS = did not start
