= Kerri Morgan =

American Paralympic athlete

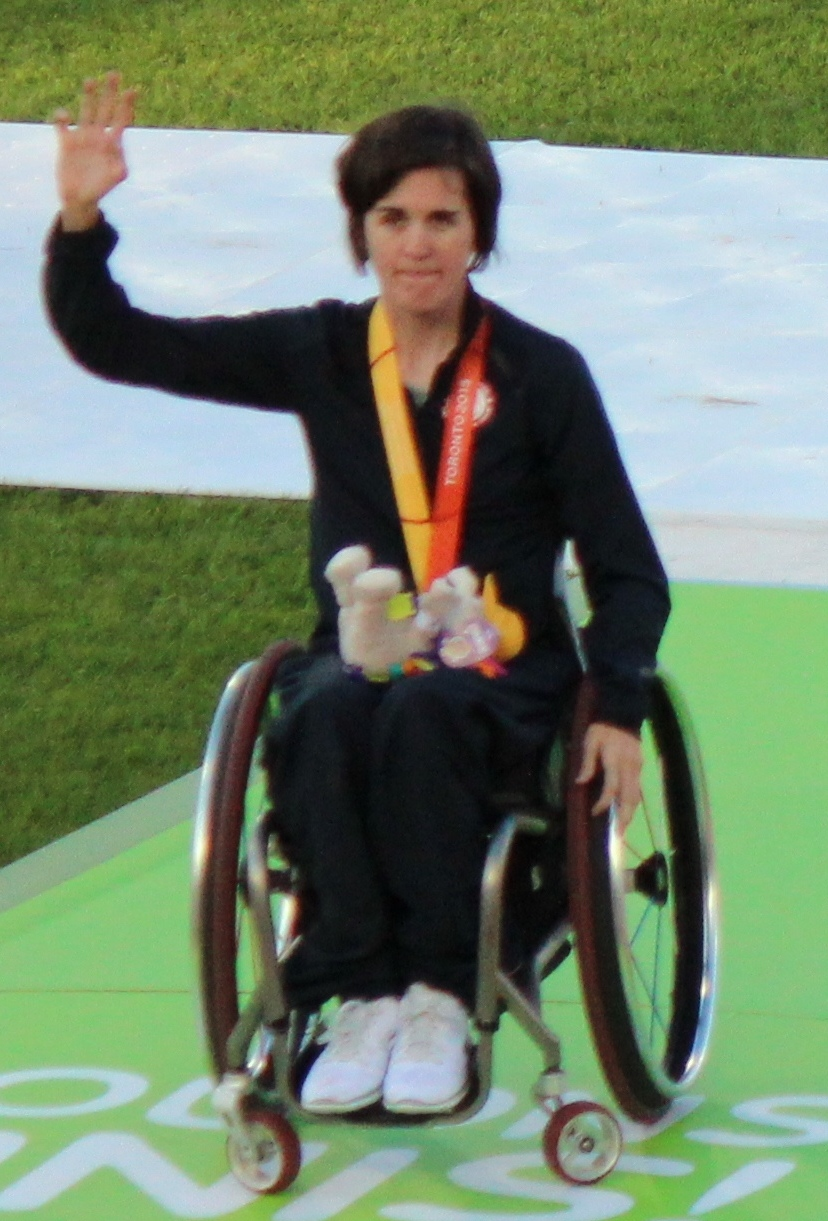
- Morgan at the 2015 Parapan American Games

Personal information
- Born: June 14, 1974 (age 52) Port Jefferson, New York, U.S.
- Education: Texas Christian University; Washington University in St. Louis
- Height: 5 ft 1 in (1.55 m)

Sport
- Sport: Paralympic athletics
- Disability class: T52
- Event: 100-800 m
Medal record
Representing United States
Paralympic Games
| Silver medal – second place | 2016 Rio de Janeiro | 100 m T52 |
| Bronze medal – third place | 2012 London | 100 m T52 |
| Bronze medal – third place | 2012 London | 200 m T52 |
IPC World Championships
| Gold medal – first place | 2011 Christchurch | 800 m T52 |
| Silver medal – second place | 2011 Christchurch | 100 m T52 |
| Silver medal – second place | 2011 Christchurch | 200 m T52 |
| Silver medal – second place | 2011 Christchurch | 400 m T52 |
| Silver medal – second place | 2013 Lyon | 200 m T52 |
| Silver medal – second place | 2013 Lyon | 800 m T52 |
| Bronze medal – third place | 2013 Lyon | 100 m T52 |
Parapan American Games
| Silver medal – second place | 2015 Toronto | 100 m T52 |

Kerri Morgan (born June 11, 1974) is an American Paralympian T52 wheelchair racer. She won the 800 m event at the 2011 IPC Athletics World Championships.

== Personal life ==
Morgan was born in 1974 in Port Jefferson, New York. She completed a degree in psychology at Texas Christian University, later gaining a master's degree in occupational therapy from Washington University in St. Louis. She later worked as an intern at the White House before taking on the role as occupational therapist at Washington University.

== Sporting career ==
Morgan did not set out to be a wheelchair sprint athlete, preferring to play wheelchair rugby and became the first woman to make the U.S. rugby team. In 2009, she was part of the U.S. Rugby team that won gold at the IWRF Americas Championship in Buenos Aires. She took to the track in an attempt to improve her speed on the rugby court, only to find that she had an aptitude to racing.

In 2007, she took first place in the 200m and second place in the 100m at the U.S. national meet. The next year she achieved the same results at the U.S. Paralympic Trials for Track and Field event at Tempe, Arizona. Her success at the trials saw her chosen for both sprint events in the T52 class at the 2008 Summer Paralympics in Beijing. In Beijing Morgan finished fifth in both races.

In 2011, she joined the U.S. team at the IPC Athletics World Championships in Christchurch, New Zealand. Morgan competed in four events, 100 m, 200 m, 400 m and 800 m. She won the 800 m becoming world champion in the T52 class, while she collected silver in the other three races. In all three events where she finished second she was beaten by Canadian Michelle Stilwell, but at 800 m it was Morgan who beat Stilwell into second place.

Morgan qualified for her second Paralympic Games in 2012 in London. She entered both the 100 m and 200 m sprint taking bronze in both. The next year Morgan travelled to France to take part in the 2013 IPC Athletics World Championships in Lyon. There she won the bronze in the 100 m, and silver in both the 200 m and 800 m, denied by her old rival, Michelle Stilwell.
