= Athletics at the 2004 Summer Paralympics – Women's shot put F42–46 =

Women's Shot Put F42-46 at the XII Paralympic Games
- Venue: Athens Olympic Stadium
- Dates: 27 September 2004
- Competitors: 17 from 14 nations
- Winning distance: 9.37

Medalists
1st place, gold medalist(s)		Zheng Bao Zhu	China
2nd place, silver medalist(s)		Perla Bustamante	Mexico
3rd place, bronze medalist(s)		Noralvis de las Heras	Cuba

The Women's shot put F42-46 event for amputee athletes was held at the 2004 Summer Paralympics in the Athens Olympic Stadium on 25 September. It was won by Zheng Bao Zhu, representing China.

27 Sept. 2004, 10:45

Rank	Athlete	Result	Points	Notes
1st place, gold medalist(s)	Zheng Bao Zhu (CHN)	9.37	1251	WR
2nd place, silver medalist(s)	Perla Bustamante (MEX)	8.87	1185	
3rd place, bronze medalist(s)	Noralvis de las Heras (CUB)	11.90	1109	WR
4	Bozena Zych (POL)	8.03	1072	
5	Andrea Scherney (AUT)	11.33	1056	
6	Wu Hong Ping (CHN)	11.83	1044	
7	Jelena Vukovic (CRO)	7.79	1040	
8	Michaela Daamen (GER)	11.04	1029	
9	Ivita Strode (LAT)	7.15	955	
10	Sabine Uthess (GER)	10.74	948	
11	Stela Eneva (BUL)	9.42	878	
12	Marjaana Vare (FIN)	6.24	833	
13	Tatiana Mezinova (RUS)	8.86	826	
14	Giuliana Cum (ITA)	8.43	786	
15	Artimiza Sequeira (CPV)	5.19	693	
16	Sarote Ravai Fiu (FIJ)	7.71	680	
	Yao Juan (CHN)	NMR		
