= Table tennis at the 2012 Summer Paralympics – Men's individual – Class 9 =

Table tennis Men's C9 at the XIV Paralympic Games
- Venue: ExCeL Exhibition Centre
- Dates: 30 August – 2 September 2012
- Competitors: 12 from 10 nations

Medalists
1st place, gold medalist(s)		Ma Lin	China
2nd place, silver medalist(s)		Stanislaw Fraczyk	Austria
3rd place, bronze medalist(s)		Gerben Last	Netherlands

The Men's individual table tennis - Class 9 tournament at the 2012 Summer Paralympics in London took place from 30 August to 2 September 2012 at ExCeL Exhibition Centre. Classes 6–10 are for athletes with a physical impairment who competed from a standing position; the lower the number, the greater the impact the impairment was on an athlete's ability to compete.

In the preliminary stage, athletes competed in four groups of three. Winners of each group qualified for the semi-finals, together with four seeded players given byes for the preliminary round.

== Results ==
All times are local (BST/UTC+1)

=== Finals ===
Quarter-finals: 1 Sep 10:20
1	Ma Lin (CHN)	11	11	14
Frédéric Bellais (FRA)	4	6	12
Cedrik Cabestany (FRA)	11	13	5	11
4	Yuriy Shchepanskyy (UKR)	4	11	11	9
3	Gerben Last (NED)	9	11	11	11
Thomas Bouvais (FRA)	11	8	9	9
Andreas Aulie (NOR)	7	6	11	4
2	Stanislaw Fraczyk (AUT)	11	11	8	11

Semifinals: 1 Sep 19:45
1	Ma Lin (CHN)	11	11	11
Cedrik Cabestany (FRA)	4	5	5
3	Gerben Last (NED)	11	12	8	9	10
2	Stanislaw Fraczyk (AUT)	3	10	11	11	12

Gold-medal match: 2 Sep 12:30
1	Ma Lin (CHN)	8	11	11	13
2	Stanislaw Fraczyk (AUT)	11	7	4	11
Bronze-medal match
Cedrik Cabestany (FRA)	11	3	9	9
3	Gerben Last (NED)	8	11	11	11

=== Preliminary round ===
Qualified for the quarter-finals

==== Group A ====
Athlete	Won	Lost	Games diff	Points diff
Thomas Bouvais (FRA)	2	0	+2	+17
Vadym Kubov (UKR)	1	1	+1	-8
Zhi Liang Koh (MAS)	0	2	-3	-9

30 August, 10:20

Vadym Kubov (UKR)	14	2	11	14
Zhi Liang Koh (MAS)	12	11	6	12

30 August, 20:40

Zhi Liang Koh (MAS)	11	6	7	12	7
Thomas Bouvais (FRA)	9	11	11	10	11

31 August, 16:40

Vadym Kubov (UKR)	11	4	13	8	7
Thomas Bouvais (FRA)	7	11	11	11	11

==== Group B ====
Athlete	Won	Lost	Games diff	Points diff
Cedrik Cabestany (FRA)	2	0	+3	+6
Tahl Leibovitz (USA)	1	1	0	+2
Linus Karlsson (SWE)	0	2	-3	-8

30 August, 10:20

Cedrik Cabestany (FRA)	11	10	11	11	12
Linus Karlsson (SWE)	13	12	9	9	10

30 August, 20:40

Linus Karlsson (SWE)	12	7	9	12
Tahl Leibovitz (USA)	10	11	11	14

31 August, 16:40

Cedrik Cabestany (FRA)	11	3	11	11
Tahl Leibovitz (USA)	8	11	8	5

==== Group C ====
Athlete	Won	Lost	Games diff	Points diff
Andreas Aulie (NOR)	1	1	+1	-6
Iurii Nozdrunov (RUS)	1	1	0	+7
Tonnie Heijnen (NED)	1	1	-1	-1

30 August, 10:20

Iurii Nozdrunov (RUS)	11	9	11	15
Tonnie Heijnen (NED)	8	11	5	13

31 August, 09:00

Tonnie Heijnen (NED)	9	7	12	11	11
Andreas Aulie (NOR)	11	11	10	7	3

31 August, 16:40

Iurii Nozdrunov (RUS)	10	11	7	10
Andreas Aulie (NOR)	12	5	11	12

==== Group D ====
Athlete	Won	Lost	Games diff	Points diff
Frédéric Bellais (FRA)	2	0	+3	+20
Esa Miettinen (FIN)	1	1	+1	+3
Tunde Adisa (NGR)	0	2	-4	-23

30 August, 10:20

Esa Miettinen (FIN)	11	6	11	11
Tunde Adisa (NGR)	8	11	4	5

31 August, 09:00

Tunde Adisa (NGR)	4	11	9	5
Frédéric Bellais (FRA)	11	8	11	11

31 August, 16:40

Esa Miettinen (FIN)	7	4	11	11	6
Frédéric Bellais (FRA)	11	11	7	7	11
