= Gargano (disambiguation) =

Gargano is a historical and geographical sub-region in the province of Foggia, Apulia, southeast Italy.

Gargano may also refer to:

- Gargano (surname)
- Gargano National Park, a national park in Foggia, Italy
- Gargano goat, or Garganica, a breed of domestic goat

== See also ==
- Ally & Gargano, a defunct American advertising agency
- Apulia Carbonate Platform, a major palaeogeographic element which includes Gargano
