= Zhang Hai Yuan =

Chinese Paralympic athlete (born 1977)

Personal information
- Born: June 12, 1977 (age 49) Dandong

Sport
- Sport: Para athletics
- Disability class: T42/F42
- Event(s): Long jump, Pole vault
Medal record
Women's para athletics
Representing China
Paralympic Games
Gold medal – first place	2004 Athens	Long jump F42
FESPIC Games
Gold medal – first place	2006 Kuala Lumpur	Pole vault T42

Zhang Hai Yuan (born June 12, 1977) is a Chinese track and field athlete.

Zhang represented the People's Republic of China at the 2004 Summer Paralympics in Athens, where she won gold in the long jump (F42 disability category), setting a new world record with a jump of 3.67 metres.

In 2006, Zhang competed at the FESPIC Games in Kuala Lumpur, and won set a world record in the pole vault, winning gold.

She also competes in high jump and javelin events.
