= Thiare Casarez =

Mexican Paralympic athlete

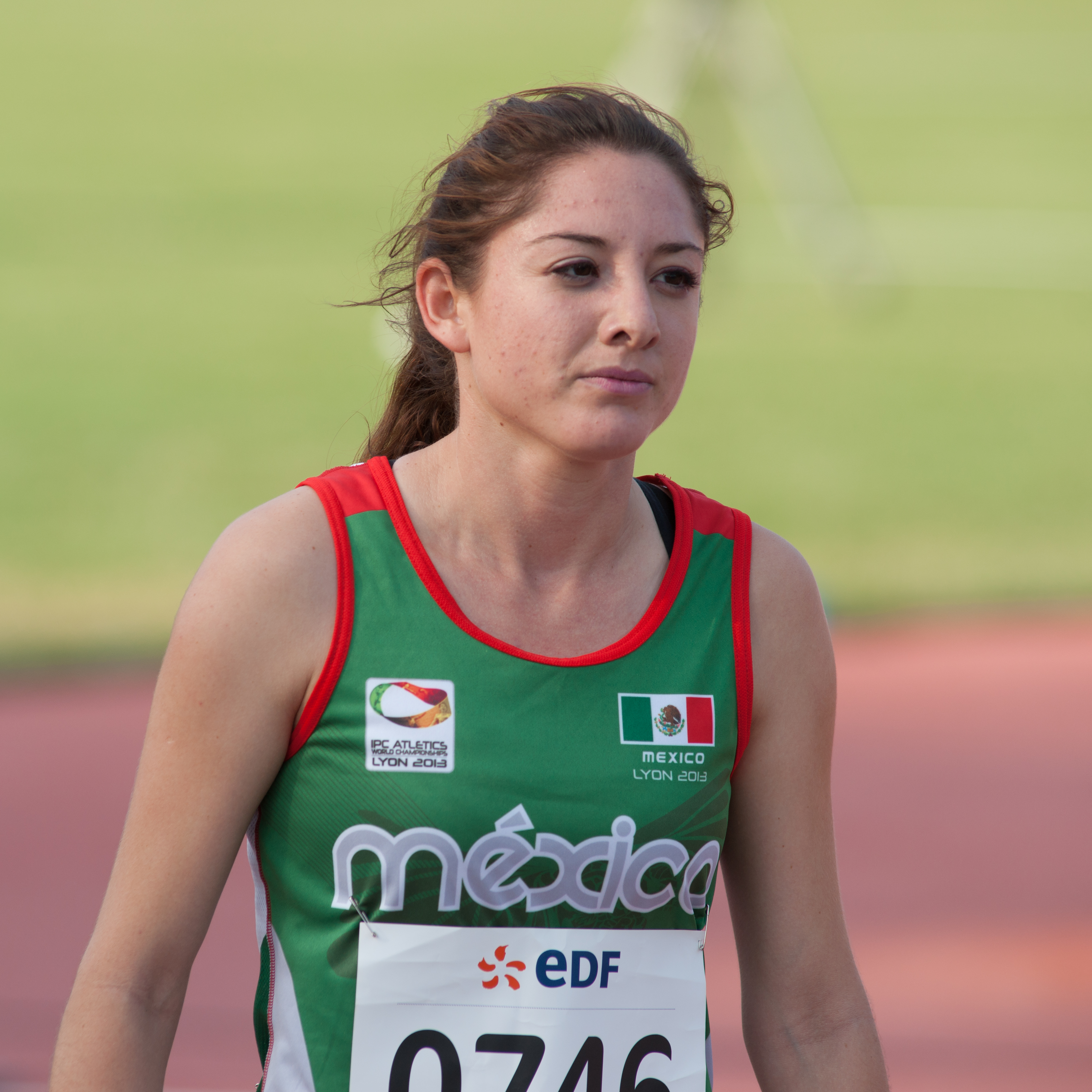
- Casarez at the 2013 IPC Athletics Championship

Personal information
- Full name: Thiare Jamilette Casarez Chinchillas
- Born: 10 January 1993 (age 33) Hermosillo, Mexico

Sport
- Sport: Athletics
- Event: Running
Medal record
Women's para-athletics (T13)
Representing Mexico
IPC Athletics World Championships
Silver medal – second place	2013 Lyon	200m T13
Silver medal – second place	2013 Lyon	400m T13

Thiare Jamilette Casarez Chinchillas (Note: In this Spanish name, the first or paternal surname is Casarez and the second or maternal family name is Chinchillas.) (born 10 January 1993), known as Thiare Casarez, is a parasport athlete from Mexico competing mainly in category T13 sprint and middle-distance racing events.

Casarez was selected to represent Mexico at the 2013 IPC Athletics World Championships in Lyon. She competed in the Women's 100m, 200m and 400m T13 races. Although she failed to medal in the 100 metres, she took silver in both the 200 and 400 metre races.
