= Gargano (surname) =

Gargano is an Italian surname. Notable people with the surname include:

- Andrea Gargano (1887–1970), Italian sport wrestler
- Camillo Gargano (1942–1999), Italian sailor
- Charles A. Gargano (born 1934), Italian-born American diplomat
- Francesco Gargano (1899–1975), Italian fencer
- Giuseppina Gargano (1853-1939), Italian opera singer
- Johnny Gargano (born 1987), American wrestler
- Maria Teresa Gargano (born 1986), Italian artistic gymnast
- Margherita Gargano (born 1952), Italian middle-distance runner
- Mario Gargano (died 2018), Italian politician
- Nicholas Gargano (1934–2016), English boxer
- Reinaldo Gargano (1934–2013), Uruguayan politician
- Walter Gargano (born 1984), Uruguayan footballer
