= Frédéric Bellais =

French para table tennis player

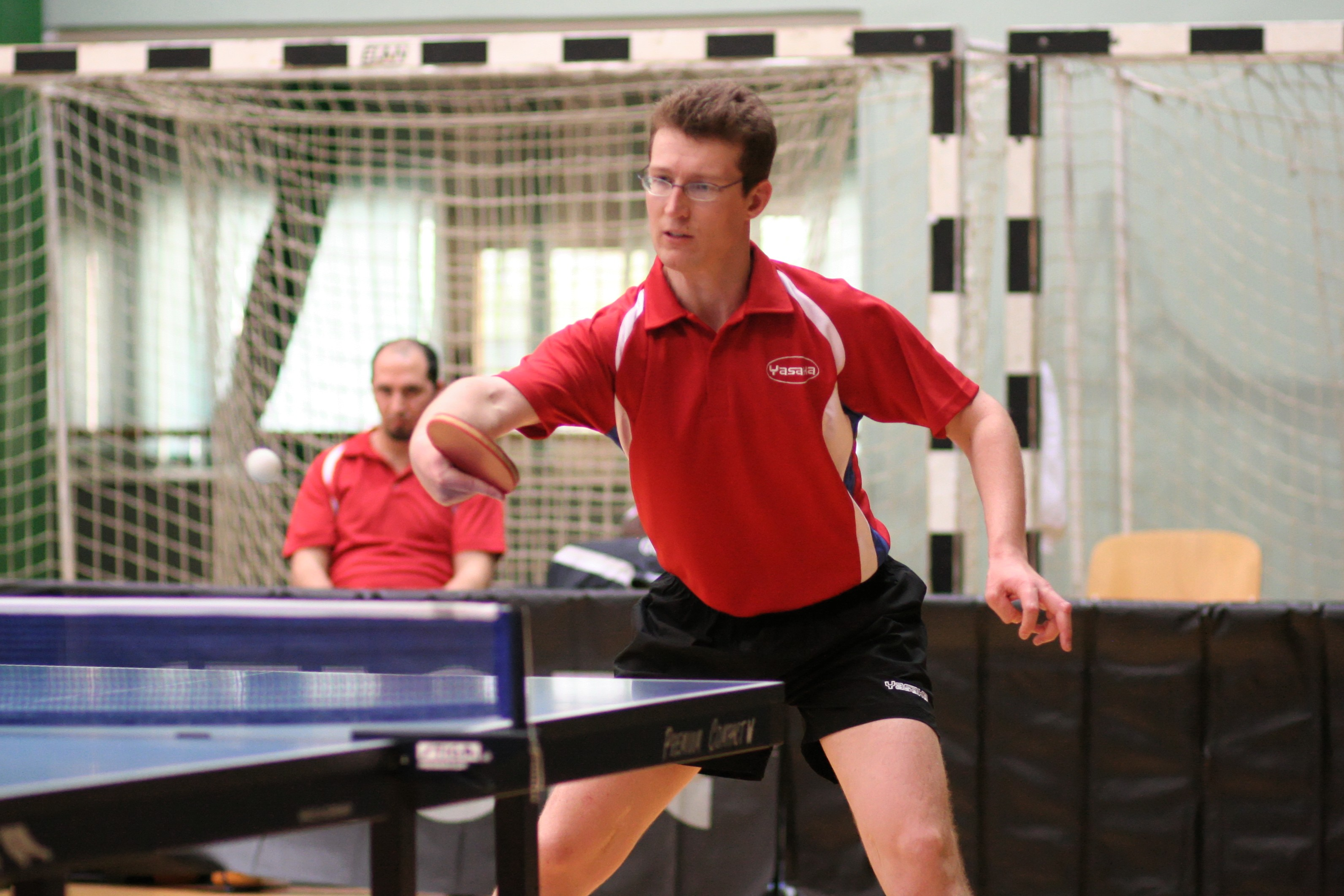

Personal information
- Born: 2 March 1983 (age 43) Caen, France

Sport
- Sport: Para table tennis
- Disability class: C9
Medal record
Para table tennis
Representing France
World Championships
| Silver medal – second place | 2010 Gwangju | Men's teams C9 |
European Championships
| Gold medal – first place | 2005 Jesolo | Men's teams C8 |
| Silver medal – second place | 2007 Kranjska Gora | Men's teams C9 |
| Bronze medal – third place | 2005 Jesolo | Men's singles C8 |
| Bronze medal – third place | 2011 Split | Men's teams C9 |
| Bronze medal – third place | 2015 Vejle | Men's teams C10 |

Frédéric Bellais (born 2 March 1983) is a retired French para table tennis player who competed in international elite events. He is a European champion and a World silver medalist. Bellais has competed at the 2012 Paralympic Games, he reached the quarterfinals in the men's singles Class 9 where he got defeated by the eventual Paralympic champion Ma Lin.
