= Perla Bustamante =

Mexican Paralympic athlete (born 1964)

Medal record

Paralympic athletics

Representing Mexico

Paralympic Games
Gold medal – first place	2008 Beijing	100m - T42
Silver medal – second place	2004 Athens	SP - F42-46
Bronze medal – third place	2004 Athens	LJ - F42

Perla Bustamante Corona (born 17 August 1964) is a Paralympic athlete from Mexico competing mainly in category T42 sprint events.

Bustamante was born in Ciudad Juárez in 1964 and earned a degree in industrial engineering from the Chihuahua Institute of Technology. She lost her left leg while training for a triathlon in Puerto Vallarta in 1999.

She competed in the 2004 Summer Paralympics in Athens, Greece. There she won a silver medal in the women's Shot put - F42-46 event and a bronze medal in the women's Long jump - F42 event. She also competed at the 2008 Summer Paralympics in Beijing, China. There she won a gold medal in the women's 100 metres - T42 event, finished sixth in the women's Shot put - F42-46 event and finished fourth in the women's Long jump - F42 event.
