= Cheri Madsen =

American Paralympic athlete

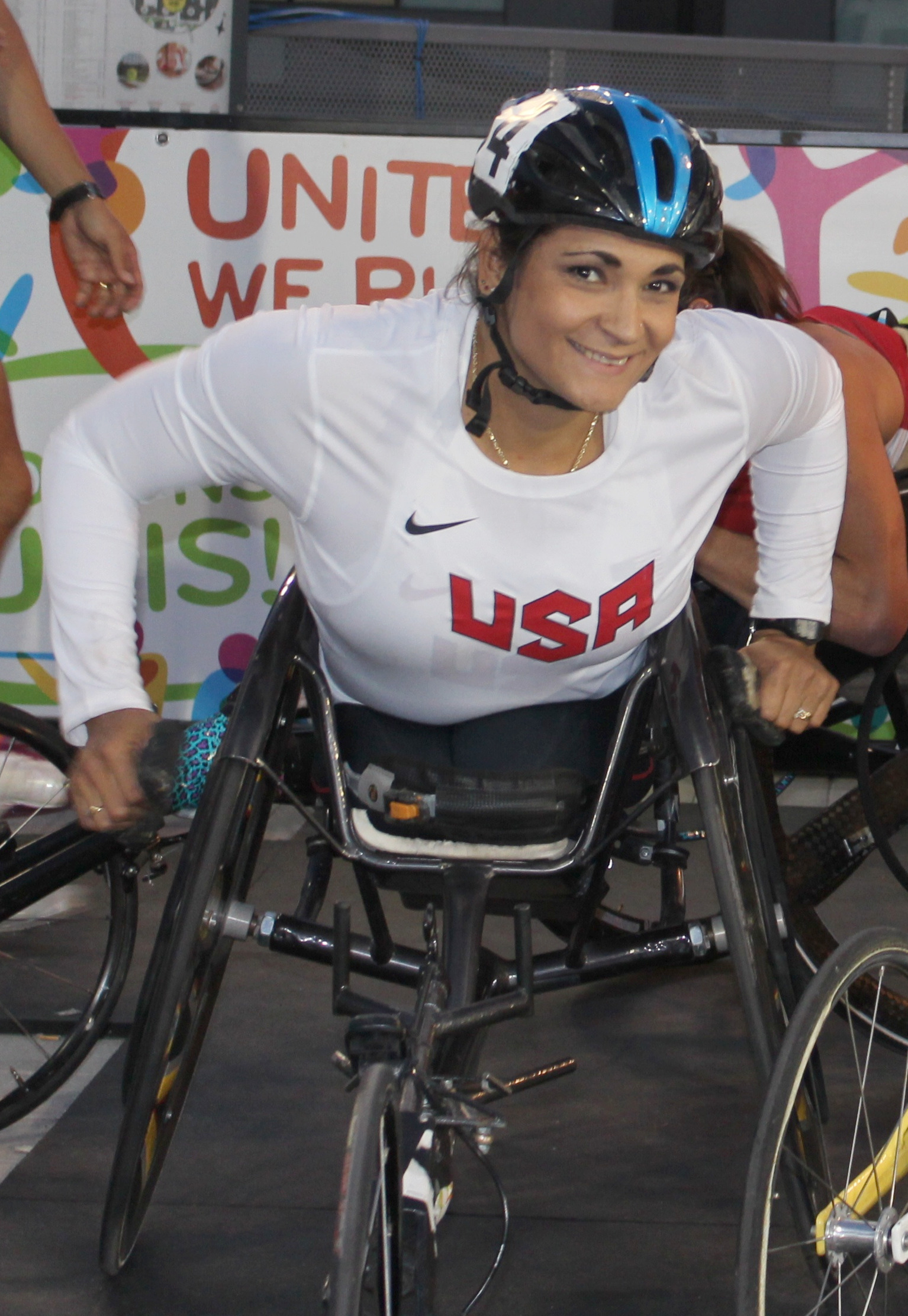
- Madsen at the 2015 Parapan American Games

Personal information
- Born: September 27, 1976 (age 50) Omaha, Nebraska, U.S.
- Height: 155 cm (5 ft 1 in)
- Weight: 52 kg (115 lb)

Sport
- Sport: Paralympic athletics
- Disability class: T54
- Event: 100–800 m
Medal record
Representing the United States
Paralympic Games
Gold medal – first place	2000 Sydney	100 m T54
Gold medal – first place	2000 Sydney	400 m T54
Silver medal – second place	1996 Atlanta	100 m T53
Silver medal – second place	1996 Atlanta	200 m T53
Silver medal – second place	2000 Sydney	200 m T54
Silver medal – second place	2016 Rio	400 m T54
Silver medal – second place	2020 Tokyo	400 m T54
Bronze medal – third place	1996 Atlanta	400 m T53
Bronze medal – third place	1996 Atlanta	800 m T53
Bronze medal – third place	2020 Tokyo	100 m T54
IPC Athletics World Championships
Silver medal – second place	2017 London	200m - T54
Bronze medal – third place	2013 Lyon	200 m T54
Bronze medal – third place	2013 Lyon	400 m T54
Parapan American Games
Silver medal – second place	2015 Toronto	400 m T54
Bronze medal – third place	2015 Toronto	800 m T54

Cheri Madsen (née Becerra; born September 27, 1976) is an American Paralympic wheelchair racing athlete.

Madsen is a Native American from the Omaha tribe. She grew up in Nebraska, graduating from Nebraska City High School in 1995. Aged three she lost the use of her legs due to an unknown viral infection in her spine. She took up wheelchair racing in 1994 and two years later qualified for the 1996 Paralympics. There, she competed in four events in classification T53, medaling in each. She participated in the 2000 Summer Paralympics in Sydney in the same four events, this time in T54, winning two gold and one silver medal. After that, she semi-retired from competitions to build a family – she married Eric Madsen on June 2, 2001, and later gave birth to daughters Reese and Malayna. In 2007 her younger brother, Mario Becerra III, and father, Mario Becerra Sr., were killed in a car-train crash. Madsen returned to competitions in 2013 to honor her brother. She qualified for the 2013 IPC World Championships, 2015 Parapan American Games and 2016 Rio Paralympics, medaling on all occasions.
