= 2013 IPC Athletics World Championships – Women's 200 metres =

The women's 200 metres at the 2013 IPC Athletics World Championships was held at the Stade du Rhône from 20–29 July.

== Medalists ==
Class	Gold	Silver	Bronze
T11	Terezinha Guilhermina; Brazil	Jerusa Santos; Brazil	Esperança Gicaso; Angola
T12	Oxana Boturchuk; Ukraine	Libby Clegg; United Kingdom	Hana Kolníková; Slovakia
T13	Sanaa Benhama; Morocco	Thiare Casarez; Mexico	Frieda Nakankaya; Namibia
T34	Hannah Cockroft; United Kingdom	Rosemary Little; Australia	Amy Siemons; Netherlands
T35	Oxana Corso; Italy	Virginia McLachlan; Canada	Carly Salmon; Australia
T36	Jeon Min-Jae; South Korea	Claudia Nicoleitzik; Germany	Aygyul Sakhibzadaeva; Russia
T37	Mandy Francois-Elie; France	Bethany Woodward; United Kingdom	Johanna Benson; Namibia
T38	Verônica Hipólito; Brazil	Sophie Hahn; United Kingdom	Margarita Goncharova; Russia
T44	Marlou van Rhijn; Netherlands	Marie-Amélie Le Fur; France	Sophie Kamlish; United Kingdom
T46	Yunidis Castillo; Cuba	Anrune Liebenberg; South Africa	Alicja Fiodorow; Poland
T52	Michelle Stilwell; Canada	Kerry Morgan; United States	Cassie Mitchell; United States
T53	Lisha Huang; China	Angela Ballard; Australia	Chelsea McClammer; United States
T54	Tatyana McFadden; United States	Amanda Kotaja; Finland	Cheri Becerra-Madsen; United States

== See also ==
- List of IPC world records in athletics
