= Sophie Kamlish =

British Paralympic sprinter

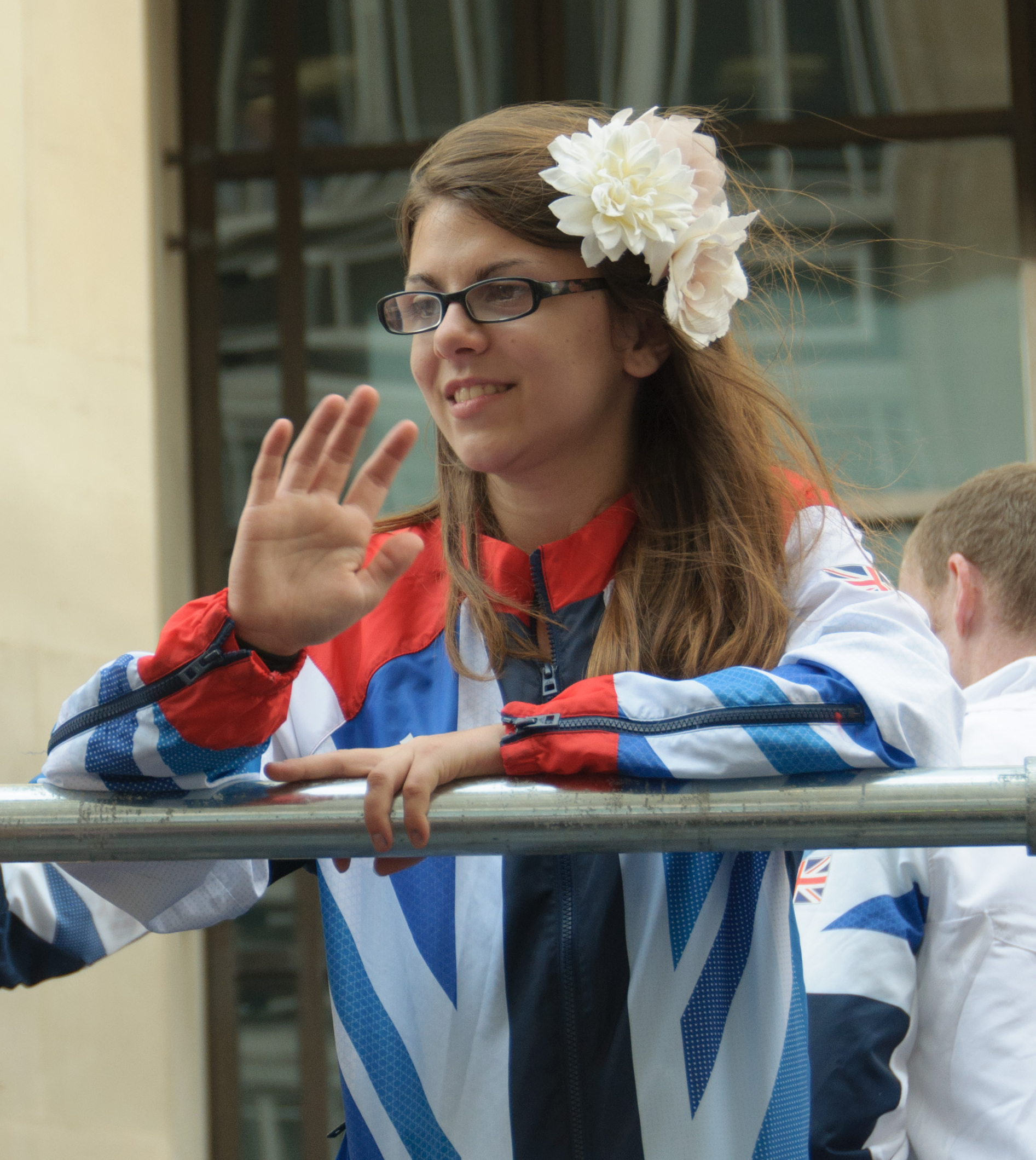

Personal information
- Full name: Sophie Florence Kamlish
- Nationality: British
- Born: 20 August 1996 (age 29) London, England

Sport
- Country: Great Britain
- Sport: Athletics
- Disability: limb deficiency
- Disability class: T64
- Event(s): 100m 200m
- Club: Team Bath
- Coached by: Rob Ellchuk

Achievements and titles
- Paralympic finals: 2012 2016 2020
- Personal best: 100m 12.90 200m 28.71
Medal record
Women's para athletics
Representing Great Britain
World Championships
Gold medal – first place	2017 London	100 m T44
Bronze medal – third place	2013 Lyon	200 m T44

Sophie Kamlish (born 20 August 1996) is a British Paralympic athlete who competes in sprint events in T44 events. She represented Great Britain at the 2012, and 2016 and 2020 Summer Paralympics.

== Early life ==
Kamlish was born in Camden, London in 1996. She was born with a right foot that was severely turned in, for which a splint was fitted to straighten it. Despite this her right leg was significantly shorter than her left and when Kamlish was nine her doctors suggested the fitting of a gradual extension frame to lengthen her leg. Kamlish was already in significant pain and there was no guarantee that the frame would work so she and her family opted for a below the knee amputation. In a 2012 interview, Kamlish stated that it was a good decision.

Kamlish grew up in Camden in London where she attended Fleet Primary School. Her family then moved to Bath, Somerset where she was educated at Oldfield School, before attending a foundation course in illustration at Bath College.

== Athletics career ==
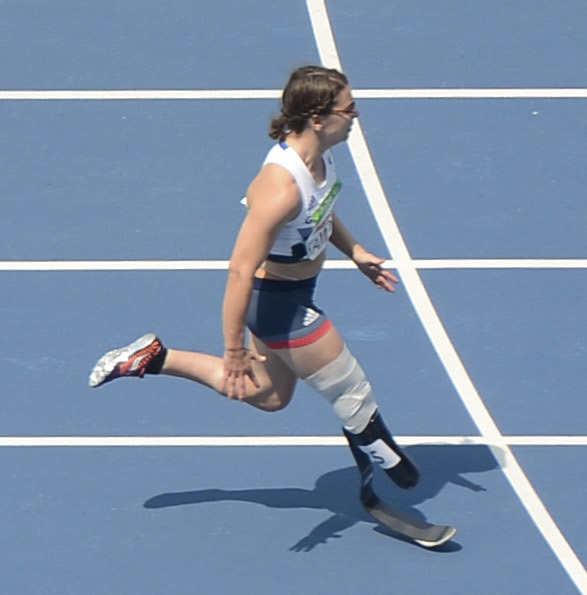
Running a world record time in Rio

In 2011 Kamlish attended a 'Playground to Podium' event at the University of Bath, a scheme intended to find talented potential athletes. Despite having played wheelchair basketball at junior level, she preferred the solo aspect and self-reliance that comes with athletics. Kamlish made her senior international debut at the 2012 Paralympic World Cup in Manchester and that year was selected for the Great Britain team at the London Paralympics. At the London Games she was selected for two events, the 100 metres and 200 metres T44 sprints. Kamlish qualified through the heats in both events but did not achieve a podium finish in either, though she did achieve a personal best in the 200m.

A year later Kamlish was back in the Great Britain team, this time travelling to Lyon to compete in the 2013 Lyon. She came fourth in the 100 metres sprint but won her first major international medal when she finished third in the 200 metres. Kamlish has also represented her country at the 2014 IPC Athletics European Championships in Swansea and the 2015 World Championships in Doha.

On 17 September 2016 at the 2016 Summer Paralympics Kamlish broke the World Record in the heats for T44 100m.

On 17 July 2017, Kamlish broke her own T44 100m world record in the heats at the World ParaAthletics Championships in London. On the same day, she also won her first international gold medal in front of a home crowd, beating four-time world champion Marlou van Rhijn.

At the 2020 Summer Olympics, Kamlish reached the final of the T64 100 meters and placed last.
