= Athletics at the 2012 Summer Paralympics – Men's 400 metres T44 =

Event at the 2012 Summer Paralympics

Men's 400 metres T44 at the XIV Paralympic Games
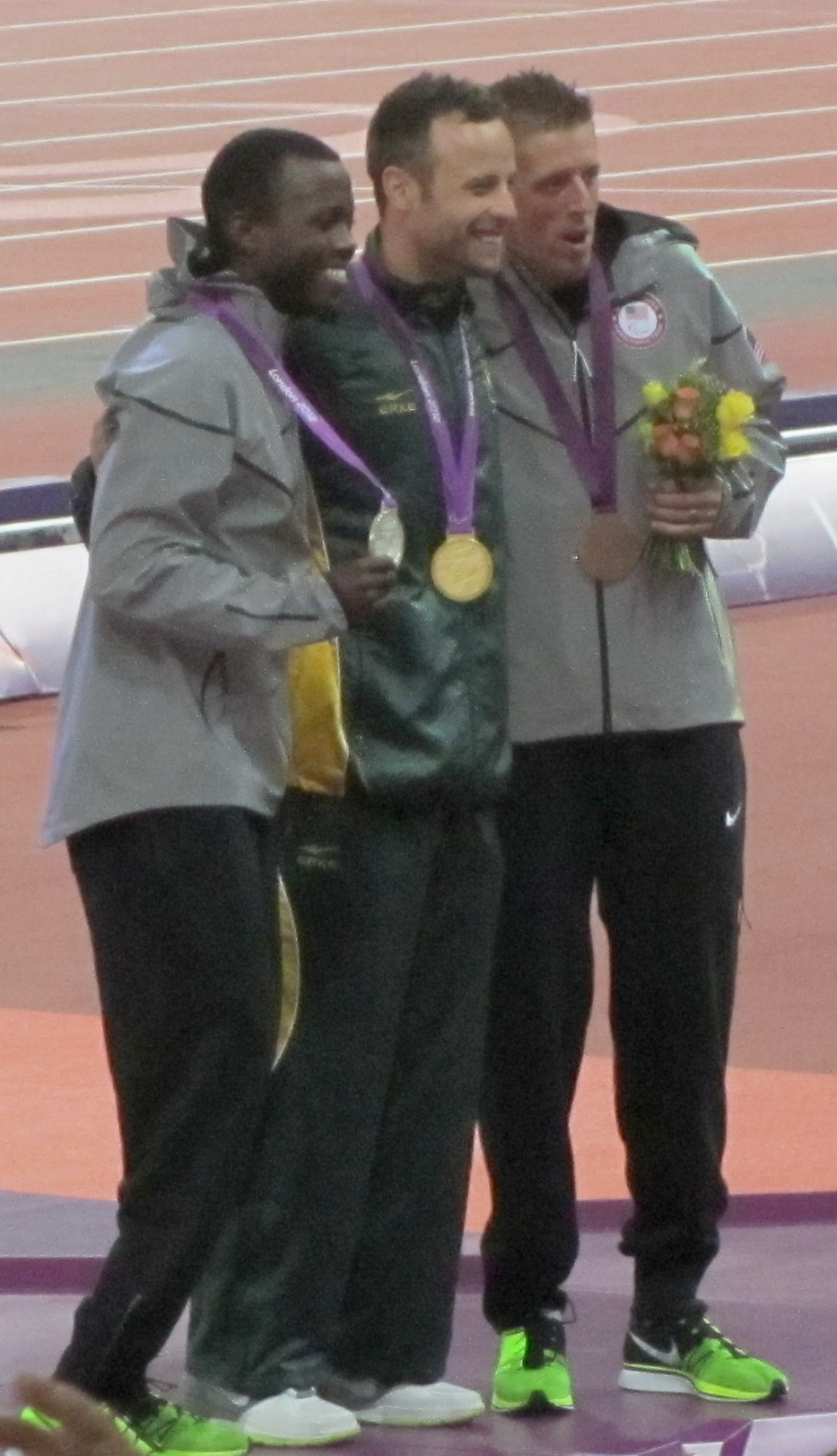
- Left-right: Leeper, Pistorius, Prince
- Venue: London Olympic Stadium
- Dates: 7 to 8 September
- Competitors: 12 from 10 nations
- Winning time: 46.68

Medalists
1st place, gold medalist(s)		Oscar Pistorius	South Africa
2nd place, silver medalist(s)		Blake Leeper	United States
3rd place, bronze medalist(s)		David Prince	United States

Athletics at the 2012 Summer Paralympics
Classification
T/F11–13: Blind and visually impaired
T/F20: Intellectual disability
T/F31–38: Cerebral palsy
F40: Les Autres
T/F42–46: Amputees
T/F51–58: Spinal cord disability
Men T/F42–46
Track
100 m	T42	T44	T46
200 m	T42	T44	T46
400 m	T44	T46
800 m	T46
1500 m	T46
4×100 m relay	T42-46
Road
Marathon	T46
Field
Long jump	F42-44	F46
Triple jump	F46
High jump	F42	F46
Shot put	F42-44	F46
Discus throw	F42	F44
Javelin throw	F42	F44
Women T/F42–46
Track
100 m	T42	T44	T46
200 m	T44	T46
400 m	T46
Field
Long jump	F42-44	F46
Shot put	F42-44
Javelin throw	F46

The Men's 400 metres T44 event at the 2012 Summer Paralympics took place at the London Olympic Stadium from 7 to 8 September.

The T44 category is for athletes who have a single below knee amputation or who can walk with moderately reduced function in one or both legs.

== Records ==
Prior to the competition, the existing world and Paralympic records were as follows:

T43	World record	Oscar Pistorius (RSA)	45.39	28 August 2011	Daegu, South Korea
T43	Paralympic record	Oscar Pistorius (RSA)	47.49	16 September 2008	Beijing, China
T43	Broken records during the 2012 Summer Paralympics				
T43	Paralympic record	Oscar Pistorius (RSA)	46.68	8 September 2012	
T44	World & Paralympic record	Jim Bob Bizzell (USA)	50.98	16 September 2008	Beijing, China
T44	Broken records during the 2012 Summer Paralympics				
T44	World record	David Prince (USA)	50.61	8 September 2012	

== Results ==
=== Round 1 ===
Competed 7 September 2012 from 21:45. Qual. rule: first 3 in each heat (Q) plus the 2 fastest other times (q) qualified.

==== Heat 1 ====
Rank	Athlete	Country	Class	Time	Notes
1	Blake Leeper	United States	T43	50.63	Q, RR
2	Alan Fonteles Cardoso Oliveira	Brazil	T43	53.02	Q, PB
3	Liu Zhiming	China	T44	54.82	Q, RR
4	Riccardo Scendoni	Italy	T44	55.88	PB
5	Jack Swift	Australia	T44	55.94	
6	Josue Benitez Sandoval	Mexico	T44	59.79	

==== Heat 2 ====
Rank	Athlete	Country	Class	Time	Notes
1	Oscar Pistorius	South Africa	T43	48.31	Q, SB
2	David Behre	Germany	T43	51.37	Q, RR
3	David Prince	United States	T44	52.29	Q, SB
4	Jarryd Wallace	United States	T44	53.51	q, PB
5	Ivan Prokopyev	Russia	T43	53.86	q, PB
6	Keita Sato	Japan	T44	DQ	

=== Final ===
Competed 8 September 2012 at 21:57.

Rank	Athlete	Country	Class	Time	Notes
1st place, gold medalist(s)	Oscar Pistorius	South Africa	T43	46.68	PR(T43)
2nd place, silver medalist(s)	Blake Leeper	United States	T43	50.14	RR
3rd place, bronze medalist(s)	David Prince	United States	T44	50.61	WR(T44)
4	Alan Fonteles Cardoso Oliveira	Brazil	T43	51.59	PB
5	David Behre	Germany	T43	51.65	
6	Jarryd Wallace	United States	T44	53.90	
7	Ivan Prokopyev	Russia	T43	54.74	
8	Liu Zhiming	China	T44	55.91	

Q = qualified by place. q = qualified by time. WR = World Record. PR = Paralympic Record. RR = Regional Record. PB = Personal Best.
