= Iurii Nozdrunov =

Russian para table tennis player

Personal information
- Born: 13 December 1989 (age 36) Oryol, Russia

Sport
- Sport: Table tennis
Medal record
Men's para table tennis
Representing RPC
Paralympic Games
Bronze medal – third place	2020 Tokyo	Singles C9

Iurii Nozdrunov (born 13 December 1989) is a Russian para table tennis player. He won one of the bronze medals in the men's individual C9 event at the 2020 Summer Paralympics held in Tokyo, Japan. He competed at the 2020 Summer Paralympics under the flag of the Russian Paralympic Committee.

He also represented Russia at the 2012 Summer Paralympics held in London, United Kingdom. He competed in the men's individual C9 and men's team C9–10 events.
