= Mami Tani =

Japanese paratriathlete

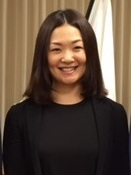

Personal information
- Born: 12 March 1982 (age 44) Kesennuma, Japan
- Height: 1.63 m (5 ft 4 in)
- Weight: 52 kg (115 lb)

Sport
- Country: Japan
- Sport: Paralympic athletics
- Disability: Osteosarcoma survivor
- Disability class: PTS5
Medal record
Paralympic athletics
Representing Japan
World Para Athletics Championships
Bronze medal – third place	2013 Lyon	Long jump T44
Paratriathlon
World Triathlon Championships
Gold medal – first place	2017 Rotterdam	PTS4
Bronze medal – third place	2018 Gold Coast	PTS4

Mami Tani née Sato (谷 真海, Tani Mami, born 12 March 1982) is a Japanese paratriathlete and former long jumper. She was a World bronze medalist and has competed in three Paralympic Games in track and field, her highest achievement was reaching sixth place at the 2008 Summer Paralympics. Tani competed at the 2020 Summer Paralympics as a triathlete and finished in tenth position.

Tani had her right leg amputated below her knee after she developed osteosarcoma while at Waseda University.
