= Marije Smits =

Dutch Paralympic athlete (born 1986)

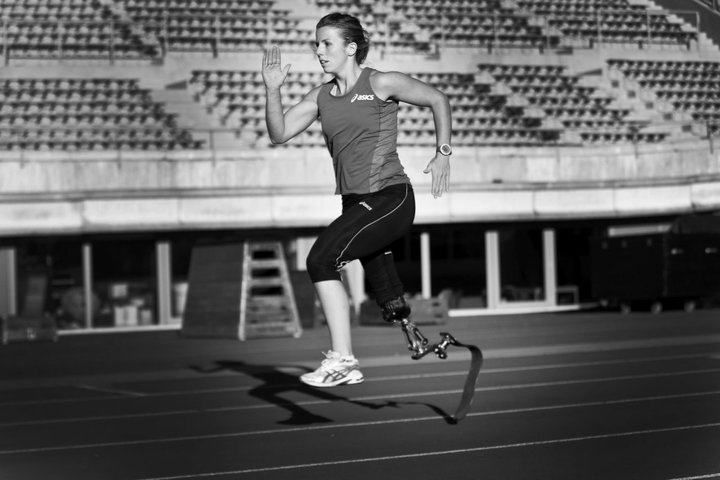
- Marije Smits training in Amsterdam

Personal information
- Born: 24 October 1986 (age 39) Gouda, Netherlands

Sport
- Country: Netherlands
- Sport: Paralympic athletics
- Disability class: T42
Medal record
Paralympic athletics
Representing Netherlands
World Championships
Gold medal – first place	2002 Lille	Long jump F42–46
Silver medal – second place	2011 Christchurch	Long jump F42

Marije Smits (born 24 October 1986) is a Dutch amputee and Paralympian named "2011 Paralympic Athlete of the Year" by the Dutch Athletics Union. She competed at the Netherlands at the 2012 Summer Paralympics and she did not win a medal.
