= Andrea Holmes =

Canadian Paralympic alpine skier (born 1982)

Andrea Holmes (born 3 January 1982) is a former Canadian Paralympic athlete, para-athlete in long jump, alpine ski, 100m run and high jump, and a Paralympic torchbearer.

== History ==
Holmes wears a prosthetic on her left leg. She was born with fibular hemimelia and her parents chose to amputate her left foot, so that she could have a more active lifestyle.

As an athlete, she represented Canada from 2002 to 2007, winning a bronze medal for long jump at the Para-Pan American Games in 2007. She was also part of the BC Para-Alpine ski team, and placed third in 2008 in alpine.

She has been the Canadian long jump champion four times, the 100m champion three times and holds a Canadian record in high jump.

She is the subject of Coni Martin's short documentary My Favourite Leg, which was shown at the Vancouver International Women in Film Festival and Langara College's Just Film Festival. The film premiered at the United Nations Headquarters in New York City as part of the United Nations Enable Film Festival.

She was also a Paralympic torchbearer.

Her coach was Victoria-based Ron Parker.

Holmes completed a degree in International Business at the University of Victoria. After the 2010 Paralympics, Holmes retired from competition and became a banker, having taken part in the RBC Olympian program. She has a daughter.

She has several prosthetic legs—for running, swimming, dress and everyday use.
