= 2013 IPC Athletics World Championships – Women's 400 metres =

The women's 400 metres at the 2013 IPC Athletics World Championships was held at the Stade du Rhône from 20–29 July.

== Medalists ==
Class	Gold	Silver	Bronze
T11	Terezinha Guilhermina; Brazil	Maria Silva; Angola	Miroslava Sedlackova; Czech Republic
T13	Olena Gliebova; Ukraine	Thiare Casarez; Mexico	Erin McBride; United Kingdom
T37	Evgeniya Trushnikova; Russia	Neda Bahi; Tunisia	Viktoriya Kravchenko; Ukraine
T46	Yunidis Castillo; Cuba	Anrune Liebenberg; South Africa	Teresinha Santos; Brazil
T53	Zhou Hongzhuan; China	Shirley Reilly; United States	Angela Ballard; Australia
T54	Tatyana McFadden; United States	Manuela Schaer; Switzerland	Cheri Becerra-Madsen; United States

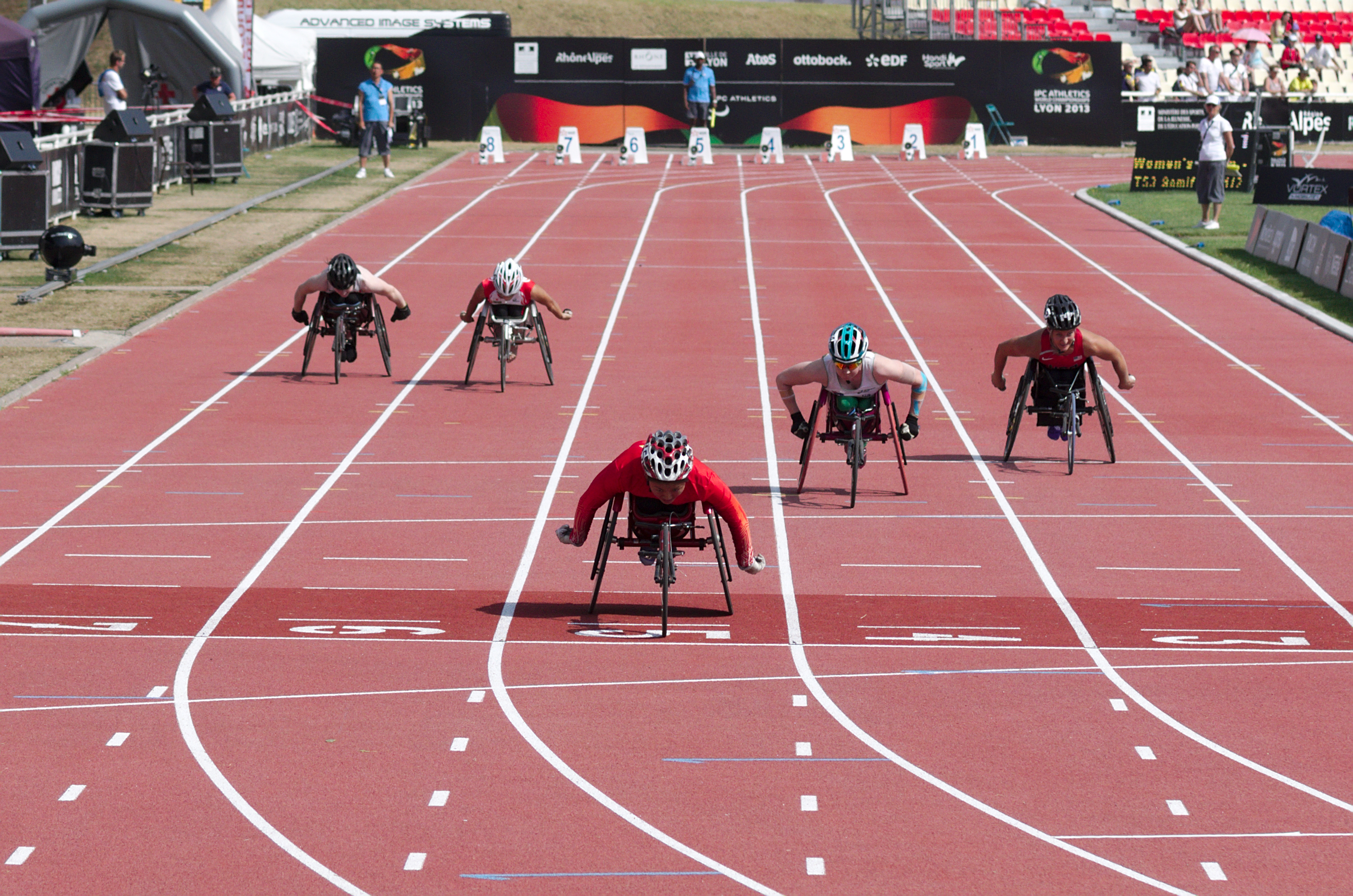
Women's T53 1st semi-final

== See also ==
- List of IPC world records in athletics
