= Kate Horan =

New Zealand paralympic athlete

Kate Horan MNZM
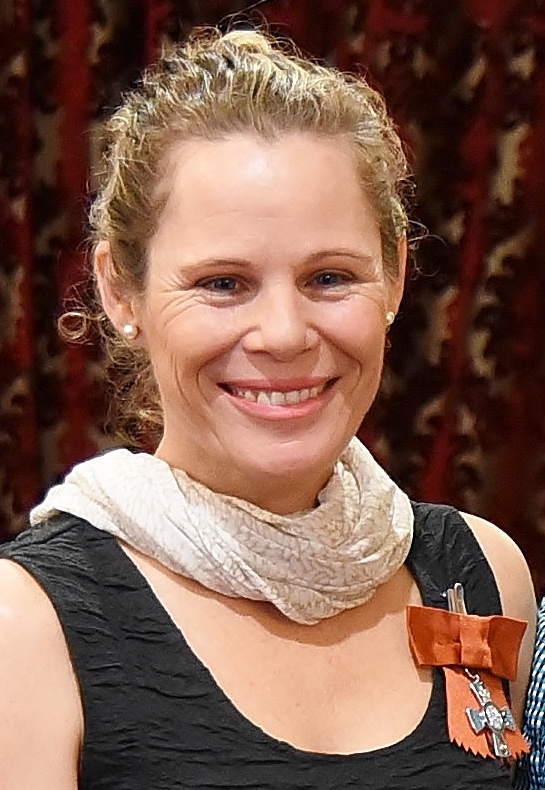
- Horan in 2017

Personal information
- Full name: Katherine Horan
- Born: 9 June 1975 (age 51) Wellington, New Zealand

Sport
- Sport: Athletics; Cycling
- Disability class: Athletics: T44; Cycling: C4
Medal record
Representing New Zealand
Women's para athletics
Paralympic Games
| Silver medal – second place | 2008 Beijing | 200 m T44 |
Women's para track cycling
World Championships
| Silver medal – second place | 2018 Rio de Janeiro | 500 m time trial C4 |
| Bronze medal – third place | 2019 Apeldoorn | 500 m time trial C4 |

Katherine Horan MNZM (born 9 June 1975) is a New Zealand paralympics runner and cyclist.

Horan secured a silver medal for the Women's 200m at the 2008 Summer Paralympics for her country after two runners ahead of her tripped.

In 2012, she switched from athletics to cycling. She was selected to compete in cycling at the 2016 Summer Paralympics.

She was appointed a Member of the New Zealand Order of Merit in the 2017 New Year Honours, for services to Paralympic sport.

In March 2018, she won the silver medal in the 500m time trial (C4) event at the UCI Para-cycling Track World Championships in Rio de Janeiro.

In March 2019, she won the bronze medal in the 500m time trial (C4) event at the UCI Para-cycling Track World Championships in Apeldoorn.
