= Andrea Scherney =

Austrian Paralympic athlete

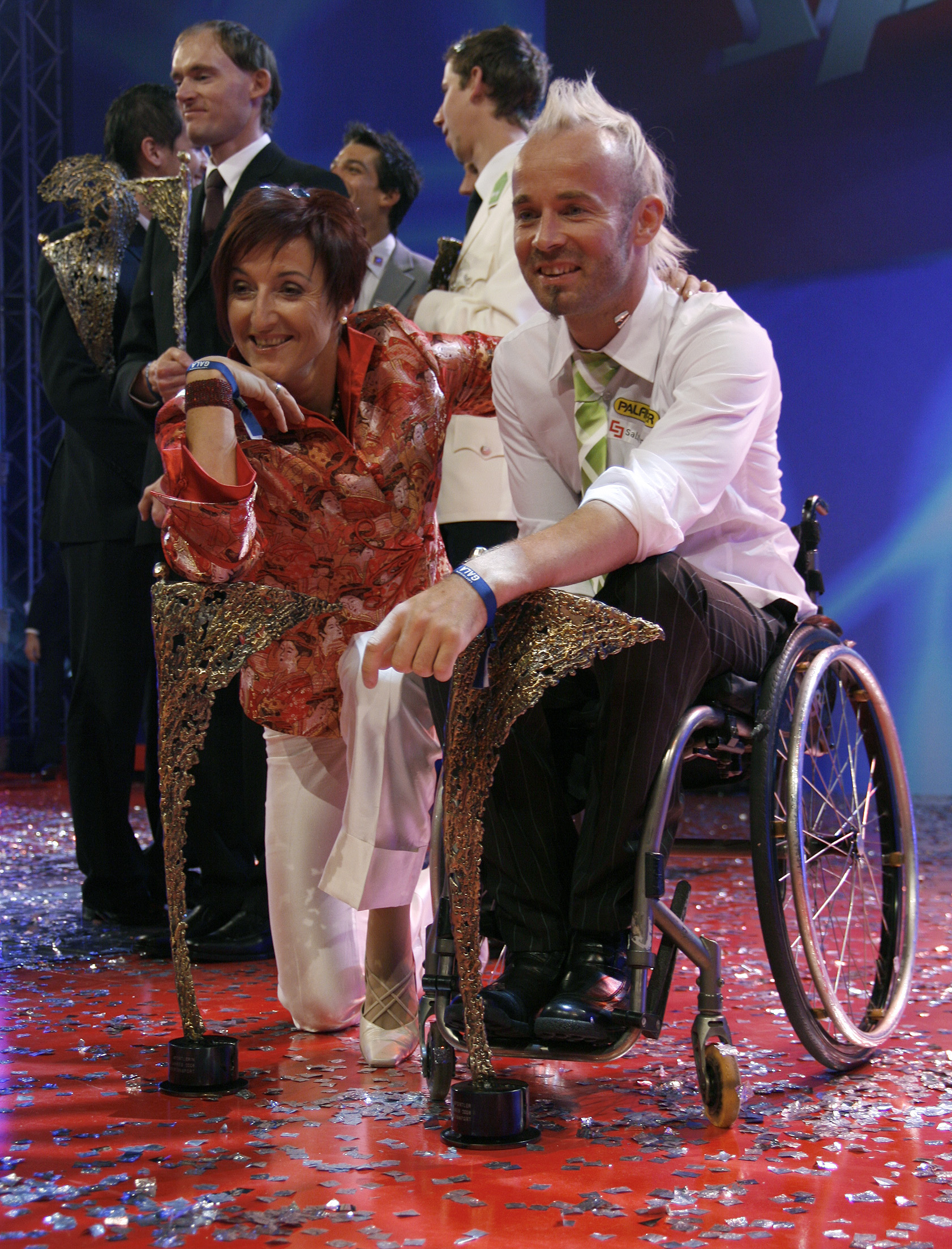
- Andrea Scherney with Thomas Geierspichler at the presentation of the Austrian Sports Personalities of the Year 2008

Medal record

Paralympic athletics

Representing Austria

Paralympic Games
Gold medal – first place	1996 Atlanta	Javelin Throw – F42-44/46
Gold medal – first place	2004 Athens	Long Jump – F44/46
Gold medal – first place	2008 Beijing	Long Jump - F44
Silver medal – second place	2000 Sydney	Javelin Throw - F44
Silver medal – second place	2000 Sydney	Shot Put - F44

Andrea Scherney is a Paralympic athlete from Austria competing the F44 classification for single below-knee amputees.

== Career ==
Scherney has competed in four Paralympic Games, starting in 1996 in Atlanta, United States continuing through 2000 in Sydney, Australia and 2004 in Athens, Greece as well as the 2008 Summer Paralympics in Beijing China. She has competed in various events at each and has always won at least one medal, gold in the javelin for F42-44/46 in 1996, long jump for F44/46 in 2004 and for F44 in 2008 and silvers in both the F44 shot put and javelin in 2000.

She holds the world record in the P44 pentathlon, an event combining long jump, shot put, 100m sprint, discus and 400m run.

== Private ==
Werner Groiß, an Austrian politician, is one of her cousin's.
