= Thomas Bouvais =

French para table tennis player

Personal information
- Nickname: Tom
- Born: 29 May 1991 (age 35) Meulan-en-Yvelines, France

Sport
- Country: France
- Sport: Para table tennis
- Disability: Achondroplasia, hyperlordosis
- Disability class: C8
Medal record
Para table tennis
Representing France
World Championships
Silver medal – second place	2010 Gwangju	Men's teams C9
World Team Championships
Bronze medal – third place	2017 Bratislava	Men's teams C8
European Championships
Bronze medal – third place	2011 Split	Men's teams C9

Thomas Bouvais (born 29 May 1991) is a French para table tennis player who competes in international elite competitions. He has won two-time World medalist and a bronze European medalist in the team events, he has also competed at the 2012 and 2016 Summer Paralympics in both singles and team events but did not medal in either event.
