= Wang Juan (athlete) =

Chinese Paralympic athlete

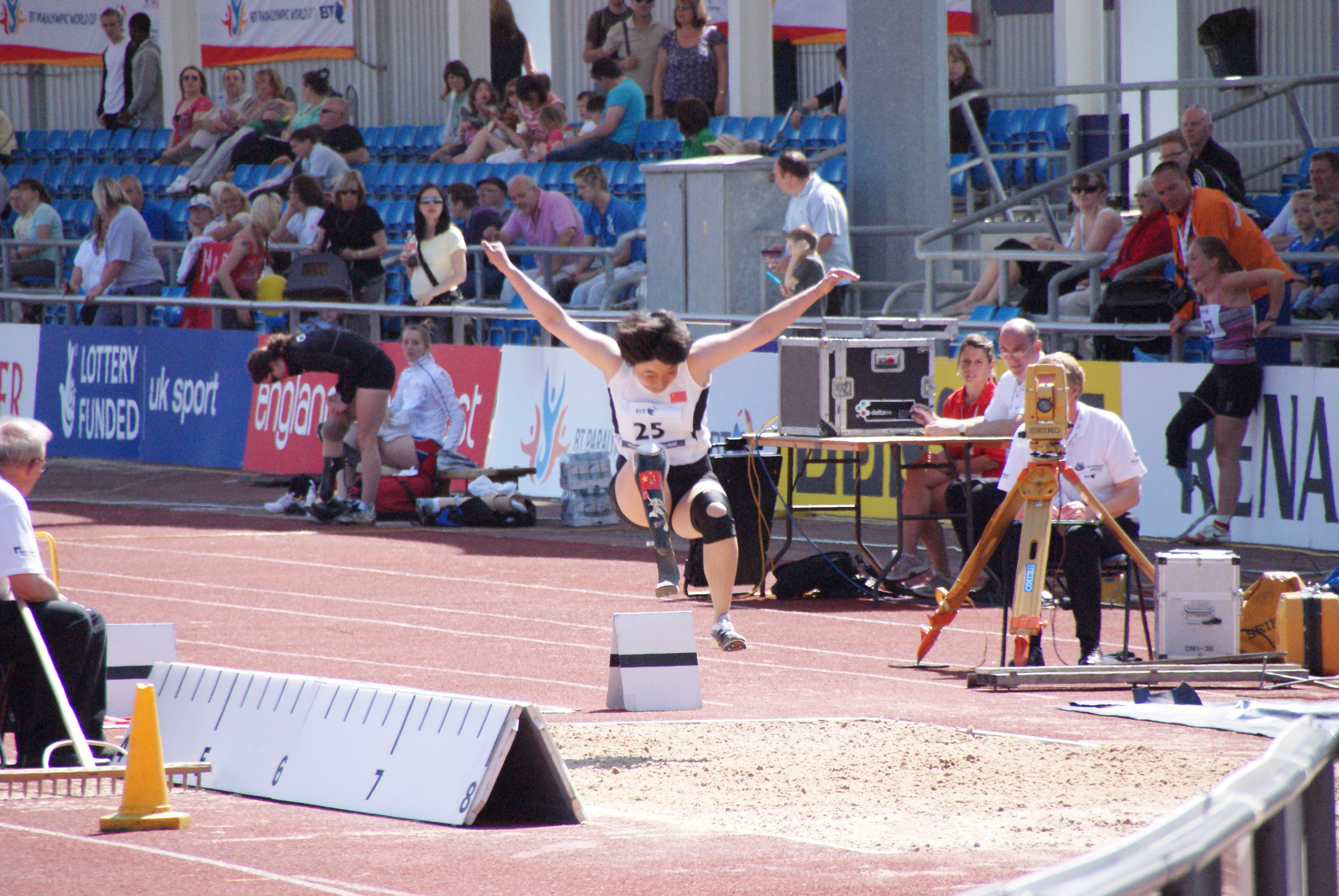
- Wang in 2009

Personal information
- Born: 3 September 1975 (age 50)

Sport
- Sport: Paralympic athletics
Medal record
Paralympic athletics
Representing China
Paralympic Games
Silver medal – second place	2004 Athens	Long jump F44/46
Bronze medal – third place	2000 Sydney	100 m T44
Bronze medal – third place	2000 Sydney	200 m T44
Bronze medal – third place	2008 Beijing	100 m T44
World Championships
Gold medal – first place	2002 Lille	100m T44
Silver medal – second place	1998 Birmingham	Long jump F44
Silver medal – second place	2002 Lille	200m T44
Bronze medal – third place	1998 Birmingham	100m T44
Asian Para Games
Gold medal – first place	2010 Guangzhou	100m T44
Silver medal – second place	2010 Guangzhou	Long jump F44/46

Wang Juan (Chinese: 汪涓, born 3 September 1975) is a Paralympian athlete from China competing mainly in category T44 sprinter events.

She competed in the 2000 Summer Paralympics in Sydney, Australia where she won two bronze medals in the 100m and 200m T44. She competed in the 2004 Summer Paralympics in Athens, Greece where she won the silver medal in the long jump F44/46. She returned to the Paralympics in 2008 in Beijing, China winning one more bronze medal in the T44 100m.

Wang Juan and several other Paralympians training in Beijing acted in the 1997 Chinese film Colors of the Blind, essentially as fictionalized versions of themselves.
