= Desiree Vranken =

Dutch Paralympic athlete

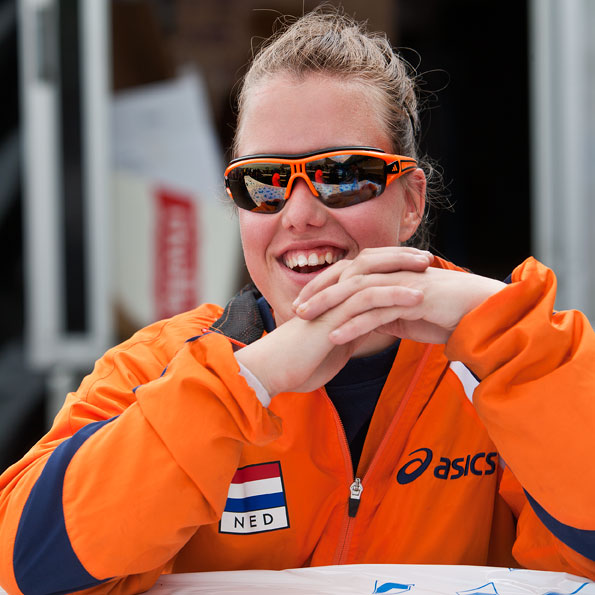

Personal information
- Nationality: Dutch
- Born: 28 June 1997 (age 28) Roermond, Netherlands

Sport
- Country: Netherlands
- Sport: Wheelchair racing
- Disability: Congenital
- Disability class: T34
- Club: Swift Atletiek: Roermond
- Coached by: Ralf Janssen
Medal record
Representing Netherlands
Paralympic Games
Silver medal – second place	2012 London	T34 200 m

Desiree Vranken (born 28 June 1997) is a Dutch wheelchair racer who competes in T34 classification sprint events. Her most notable athletics achievement came at the 2012 Summer Paralympics in London where she finished in third place to claim the bronze medal in the 200 metre sprint. Vranken has also represented her country at World and European Championships, recording four fourth places to keep her just outside the medal places.
