= Astrid Höfte =

German Paralympic athlete

Medal record

Paralympic athletics

Representing Germany

Paralympic Games
Bronze medal – third place	2008 Beijing	Long Jump - F44

Astrid Höfte is a Paralympian athlete from Germany competing mainly in category F44 long jump and T44 sprint events.

She competed in the 2008 Summer Paralympics in Beijing, China. There she won a bronze medal in the women's F44 long jump event. She also competed in the T44 100m and 200m making the final in both events.
