= Giuseppina Gargano =

Italian opera singer (1853–1939)

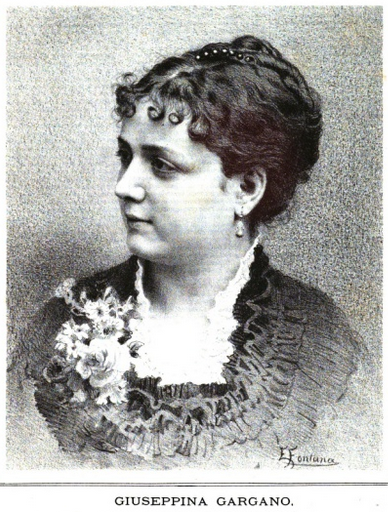
Giuseppina Gargano, from an 1885 publication.

Giuseppina Gargano (née D'Amico; 1 January 1853 — 14 September 1939) was an Italian opera singer.

== Early life ==
Giuseppina D'Amico was born in Catania, the daughter of Pietro D'Amico and Anna Bonazinga D'Amico (1830–1906). Her parents were performers: her father demonstrated mesmerism and hypnotism, and was founder of the Italian Magnetic Society, while her mother had a following as a clairvoyant (chiaroveggente). She studied voice at Bologna.

== Career ==
Giuseppina D'Amico was a teen in 1870, touring South America with her father's act, when she accepted a part in a production of La sonnambula in Montevideo. She sang the role of Gilda in Rigoletto next, and was soon performing in Buenos Aires and Rio de Janeiro as well. She was called "la piccola Malibran" (the little Malibran), a comparison to Spanish singer Maria Malibran (1808–1836). She performance internationally, from South America to London, Madrid, and Tbilisi, and all over Italy.

"This lady possesses comedy powers," a London reviewer wrote, of her 1891 turn as Rosina in The Barber of Seville. During her 1891 stay in London, she also appeared in Il Matrimonio Secreto and L'elisir d'amore.

== Personal life ==
Giuseppina D'Amico married Valerio Gargano in 1875, in Buenos Aires. They had two children, Emilia (1876–1962) and Vittorio (1886–1975). Giuseppina Gargano died in 1939, aged 86 years. Her gravesite is with her parents' and children's graves at Certosa di Bologna.
