= Marlou van Rhijn =

Dutch Paralympic athlete

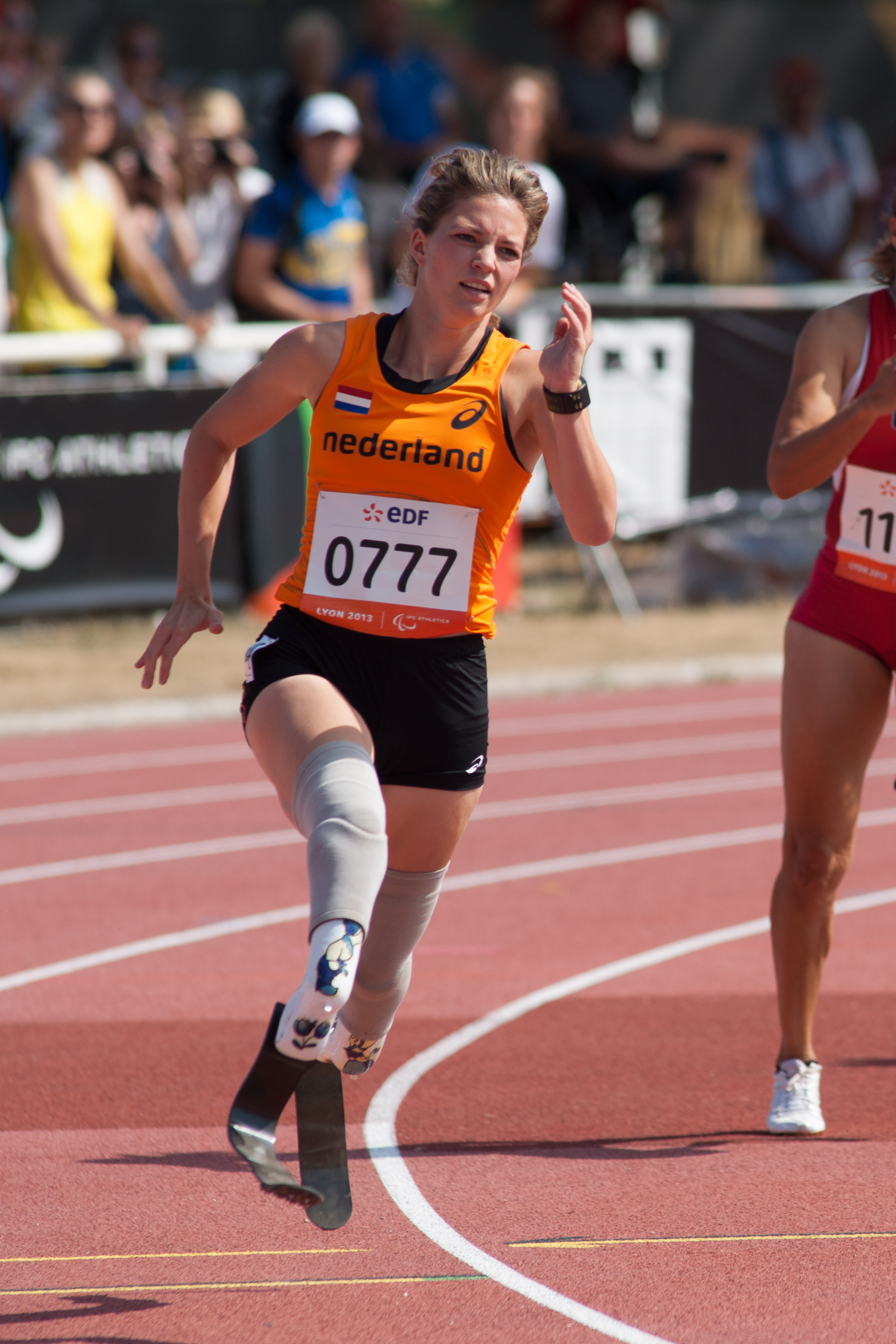
- Van Rhijn running at the IPC Athletics World Championships in 2013

Personal information
- Nickname: Blade Babe
- Born: 22 October 1991 (age 34) Monnickendam, Netherlands
- Height: 1.69 m (5 ft 6 1/2 in) in prosthetics
- Weight: 57 kg (126 lb) (2007)
- Website: www.marlouvanrhijn.nl

Sport
- Country: Netherlands
- Sport: Running; Swimming
- Events: Sprints (100, 200, 400 m); Freestyle

Achievements and titles
- Personal bests: 100 m (T43): 12.79 s (2016, WR); 200 m (T43): 25.64 s (2015, WR); 400 m (T43): 60.15 s (2013, WR)
Medal record
Women's athletics
Representing Netherlands
Paralympic Games
Gold medal – first place	2012 London	200 m (T44)
Gold medal – first place	2016 Rio de Janeiro	100 m (T44)
Gold medal – first place	2016 Rio de Janeiro	200 m (T44)
Silver medal – second place	2012 London	100 m (T44)
IPC World Championships
Gold medal – first place	2013 Lyon	100 m (T44)
Gold medal – first place	2013 Lyon	200 m (T44)
Gold medal – first place	2015 Doha	100 m (T44)
Gold medal – first place	2015 Doha	200 m (T44)
IPC European Championships
Gold medal – first place	2012 Stadskanaal	100 m (T44)
Gold medal – first place	2012 Stadskanaal	200 m (T44)
Gold medal – first place	2014 Swansea	100 m (T44)
Gold medal – first place	2014 Swansea	200 m (T44)
Bronze medal – third place	2014 Swansea	400 m (T44)
- Updated on 18 September 2016

Marlou van Rhijn (Dutch pronunciation: [mɑrˈlu vɑn ˈrɛin]; born 22 October 1991) is a retired professional Dutch former professional sprint runner. Van Rhijn, who was born without lower legs, is the world record holder for T43 in the 100 and 200 metres events and ran with the aid of carbon fibre transtibial artificial limbs. She competed in T44 (single below knee incapacity) events though she was classified in T43 (double below knee). She announced her retirement in June 2021.

== Personal ==
Marlou van Rhijn was born on 22 October 1991 in Monnickendam in the Netherlands.

She studied commercial economics at the Johan Cruyff Institute in Amsterdam.

== Swimming ==
Until 2009, Van Rhijn was a member of the national team for swimmers with a disability. Amongst others, she was swimming at a World and a European championship. She swam several Dutch national records. She competed in the S9 class and focused on the 50 and 100 meter freestyle. She stopped swimming competitively in 2010 due to lack of motivation.

== Athletics ==
Van Rhijn switched sports in 2010, after being approached by Guido Bonsen, coach of the Dutch Parathletics Team. She did a trial, and was hooked. Van Rhijn became a member of the Dutch Parathletics Team of the Koninklijke Nederlandse Atletiek Unie. Despite qualifying as T43, she competes in the class T44 at the 100 and 200 meters. She qualified for the 2012 Summer Paralympics in May 2012, while competing at the Stadio Olimpico. She was invested as a Knight of the Order of Orange-Nassau after winning her Paralympic medals.

She left the national paralympic team. She started training after the Paralympic Games in Ookmeer, Amsterdam with her new coach Parcy Marte, who also trains non-paralympic people.

In the build up to the 2016 Summer Paralympics she was supportive of Shardea Arias de la Cruz when she decided to create a Paralympic committee and team for the small island nation of Aruba.

== Achievements ==
=== Athletics ===
Time (s)	Results	Date	Event	Location
100 m (sport class T44)
13.02 (Paralympic Record)	Gold	17 September 2016	2016 Summer Paralympics	Rio de Janeiro, Brazil
13.22 (world record; personal best)	heats	1 September 2012	2012 Summer Paralympics	London, United Kingdom
13.27	Silver	2 September 2012	2012 Summer Paralympics	London, United Kingdom
13.62	Gold	27 June 2012	IPC Athletics European Championships	Stadskanaal, Netherlands
200 m (sport class T44)
26.17 (Paralympic Record)	Gold	15 September 2016	2016 Summer Paralympics	Rio de Janeiro, Brazil
26.18 (world record; personal best)	Gold	2 September 2012	2012 Summer Paralympics	London, United Kingdom
26.97	series	5 September 2012	2012 Summer Paralympics	London, United Kingdom

=== Swimming ===
Time (s)	Results	Date	Event	Location
50 m Breaststroke (sport class SB8)
51.80 (personal best)	n/a	8 March 2009	n/a	Esbjerg, Denmark
50 m Freestyle (sport class S9)
34.34 (personal best)	n/a	10 May 2009	n/a	Antwerp, Belgium
100 m Freestyle (sport class S9)
1:13.02 (personal best)	n/a	24 October 2009	n/a	Reykjavík, Iceland
200 m Freestyle (sport class S9)
2:42.44 (personal best)	n/a	29 May 2009	n/a	Berlin, Germany
400 m Freestyle (sport class S9)
5:32.36 (personal best)	n/a	21 October 2009	n/a	Reykjavík, Iceland

Awards
Preceded by Thierry Schmitter	Dutch Disabled Sportsperson of the Year; 2012, 2013	Succeeded by Bibian Mentel
