= Suzan Verduijn =

Personal information
- Born: 28 October 1983 (age 42) Hoorn, Netherlands

Sport
- Sport: Paralympic athletics
Medal record
Representing Netherlands
European Championships
Gold medal – first place	2012 Stadskanaal	Long jump F44
Silver medal – second place	2012 Stadskanaal	100m T44
Silver medal – second place	2012 Stadskanaal	200m T44

Suzan Verduijn-Stieltjes (born 28 October 1983) is a Dutch retired Paralympic athlete who competed at international track and field competitions, she was European champion in long jump and has competed at the 2012 Summer Paralympics.

Verduijn had her lower leg amputated following post-traumatic dystrophy in her ankle which she sprained when she was eleven years old.

Following retirement from para-athletics after the London Paralympics so that she could continue her university studies, she became a general practitioner after graduating with a bachelor's degree in medicine.
