= Katrin Green =

German Paralympic athlete

Medal record

Track and field (T44)

Representing Germany

Paralympic Games
Gold medal – first place	2008 Beijing	200m - T44
Bronze medal – third place	2012 London	200m - T44

Katrin Green (née Katrin Laborenz, born 16 February 1985 in Ruthweiler, Germany) is a Paralympian athlete from Germany competing mainly in category T44 sprint events.

She competed in the 2008 Summer Paralympics in Beijing, China. There she won a gold medal in the women's 200 metres - T44 event and finished fourth in the women's 100 metres - T44 event. For the winning of the gold medal 2008 at Peking she was decorated by the President of the Federal Republic of Germany with the Silver Laurel Leaf, Germany's highest sport award.

At the 2012 Summer Paralympics in London she won a bronze medal in the women's 200 metres - T44 event.

She is married to U.S. athlete Roderick Green.
