= April Holmes =

American Paralympic athlete

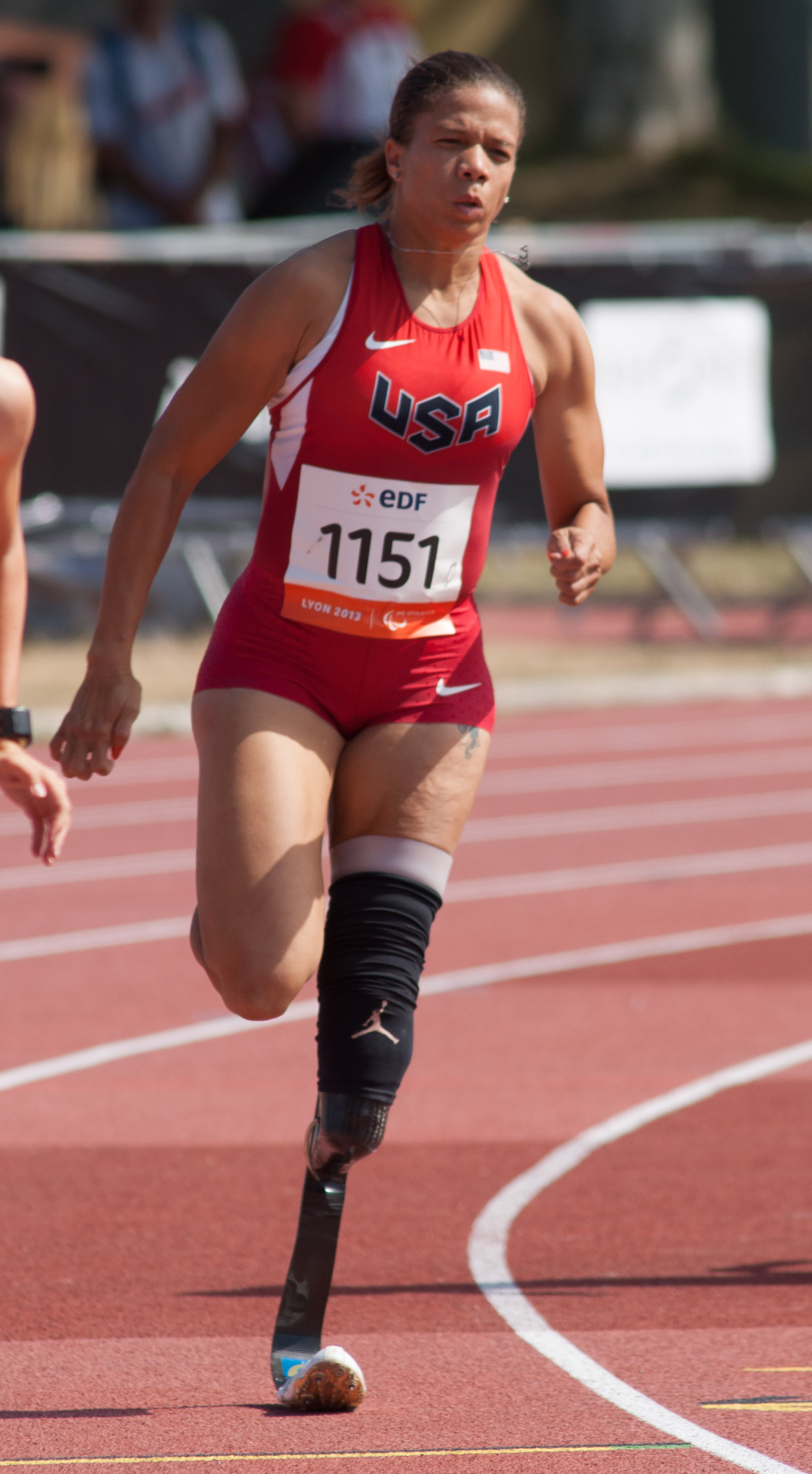
- at the T44 – 2013 IPC Athletics World Championships

Personal information
- Nationality: American
- Born: March 11, 1973 (age 53)
- Height: 5.8 ft (1.8 m) (2010)
- Weight: 140 lb (64 kg) (2010)
- Website: www.aprilholmes.com

Sport
- Sport: Paralympic athletics
- Event: all events
- Coached by: Al Joyner
Medal record
Track and field (T44)
Representing United States
Paralympic Games
Gold medal – first place	2008 Beijing	100m T44
Bronze medal – third place	2004 Athens	Long jump F44/46
Bronze medal – third place	2012 London	100m T44
IPC World Championships
Gold medal – first place	2006 Assen	100m T44
Gold medal – first place	2006 Assen	200m T44
Silver medal – second place	2002 Lille	100m T44
Bronze medal – third place	2006 Assen	Long jump T44
Bronze medal – third place	2011 Christchurch	100m T44
Bronze medal – third place	2013 Lyon	100m T44
Parapan American Games
Silver medal – second place	2007 Rio de Janeiro	100m T46

April Holmes (born 11 March 1973) is a Paralympic athlete from the USA competing mainly in category T44 (below the knee amputee) sprint events.

== Biography ==
Holmes grew up in Somerdale, New Jersey. She is a below the knee amputee (T-44) from a train accident in January 2001. She trains in Chula Vista, California. She is coached by Al Joyner (1984 Olympic Gold Medalist- Triple Jump) and sponsored by Jordan Brand, Ossur Prosthetics, and US *Paralympics, Hartford Insurance. She competed in the 2004 Summer Paralympics in Athens, Greece, where she won a bronze medal in the women's Long jump – F44/46 event, finished sixth in the women's 100 metres – T46 event, with a world T44 record and finished seventh in the women's 200 metres – T46 event. She also competed at the 2008 Summer Paralympics in Beijing, China, winning a gold medal in the women's 100 metres – T44 event, and the 2012 Summer Paralympics in London, winning a bronze medal in the women's 100 metres – T44 event.

== Education ==
She received a BS in Mass Communication from Norfolk State University, and an MBA in Marketing from University of Phoenix.

== Major achievements ==
- 2002: First place, 100m – DS/USA's International Challenge, Orlando, Fla.
- 2002: Silver medal, 100m; Fourth place, 200m – IPC Athletics World Championships, Lille, France
- 2003: Gold medal, 200m – German National Championships, Leverkusen, Germany
- 2003: Gold medal, 100m; Silver medal, 200m – Rocky Mountain State Games, Colorado Springs, Colo.
- 2004: Two world records, 100m, 200m; Bronze medal, long jump – Paralympic Games, Athens, Greece
- 2006: Two gold medals, 100m, 200m – German National Championships, Leverkusen, Germany
- 2006: Bronze medal, long jump – IPC Athletics World Indoor Championships, Sweden
- 2006: Two gold medals, 100m, 400m – Paralympic Revival, Duderstadt, Germany
- 2006: Gold medal, long jump – Visa Paralympic World Cup, Manchester, United Kingdom
- 2006: Two world records, 100m (12.98), 200m (27.10) – U.S. Paralympics Track & Field National Championships, Atlanta, Ga.
- 2006: Two gold medals, 100m, 200m; Bronze medal, Long Jump – 2006 IPC Athletics World Championships, Assen, The Netherlands
- 2007: Three gold medals, 100m, 200m and Long Jump – U.S. Paralympic Track & Field National Championships, Marietta, Ga.
- 2008: World record 200m T44/F44 (27.10)- Boiling Point Track Classic
- 2008: Three gold medals, 100m, 200m and Long Jump – U.S. Paralympic Track & Field Championships, Phoenix, Ariz.
- 2008: Gold medal, 100m – Paralympic Games, Beijing, China
- 2011: Bronze medal, 100m (T44) – IPC Athletics World Championships, Christchurch, New Zealand
- 2012: Bronze medal, 100m (T44) – Paralympic Games, London

== See also ==
- Mechanics of Oscar Pistorius's running blades
