= 2011 IPC Athletics World Championships – Men's 1500 metres =

The men's 1500 metres at the 2011 IPC Athletics World Championships is held at the QEII Stadium on 22–27, and 29 January

In the classification T37 event, there were only two competitors, so even though Irelands Michael McKillop set a World Record, he did not receive a medal, as there must be a minimum of three competitors.

== Medalists ==
Class	Gold	Silver	Bronze
T11	Odair Santos; Brazil	Samwel Mushai Kimani; Kenya	Zhang Zhen; China
T12	Abderrahim Zhiou; Morocco	Henry Kirwa; Kenya	Ignacio Avila; Spain
T13	Tarik Zalzouli; Morocco	Lukasz Wietecki; Poland	Youssef Benbrahim; Morocco
T20	Bazanjani Peyman Nasiri; Iran	Tim Page; Australia	Mncedi Khanti; South Africa
T36	Artem Arefyev; Russia	Paul Blake; Great Britain	Jose Manuel Gonzalez; Spain
T37	Michael McKillop; Ireland	Khaled Hanani; Algeria	
T46	Samir Nouioua; Algeria	Wondiye Fikre Indelbu; Ethiopia	Abraham Tarbei; Kenya
T52	Hirokazu Ueyonabaru; Japan	Thomas Geierspichler; Austria	Santiago Sanz; Spain
T54	David Weir; Great Britain	Marcel Hug; Switzerland	Saichon Konjen; Thailand

== T37 ==
The Men's 1500 metres, T37 was held on January 26

T37 = spasticity in an arm and leg on one side of the body, good functional ability on the other side.

=== Results ===
==== Final ====
Rank	Name	Nationality	Time	Notes
1	Michael McKillop	Ireland	4:14.81	WR
2	Khaled Hanani	Algeria	4:31.98	

===== Splits =====
Intermediate	Athlete	Country	Mark
400m	Michael McKillop	Ireland	1:03.85
800m	Michael McKillop	Ireland	2:14.07
1200m	Michael McKillop	Ireland	3:22.61

== T52 ==
The Men's 1500 metres, T52 was held on January 22

T52 = good shoulder, elbow and wrist function, poor to normal finger flexion and extension, no trunk or leg function

=== Results ===
==== Final ====
Rank	Name	Nationality	Time	Notes
1st place, gold medalist(s)	Hirokazu Ueyonabaru	Japan	4:04.51	
2nd place, silver medalist(s)	Thomas Geierspichler	Austria	4:04.92	
3rd place, bronze medalist(s)	Santiago Sanz	Spain	4:05.01	
4	Toshihiro Takada	Japan	4:19.94	

===== Splits =====
Intermediate	Athlete	Country	Mark
400m	Hirokazu Ueyonabaru	Japan	1:08.86
800m	Thomas Geierspichler	Austria	2:16.07
1200m	Santiago Sanz	Spain	3:19.60

== T54 ==
The Men's 1500 metres, T54 was held on January 25 and 26

T54 = normal upper limb function, partial to normal trunk function, may have significant function of the lower limbs.

=== Heats ===
Qualification: First 3 in each heat(Q) and the next 1 fastest(q) advance to the final.

Rank	Heat	Name	Nationality	Time	Notes
1	3	Julien Casoli	France	3:10.54	Q
2	3	Prawat Wahoram	Thailand	3:11.29	Q
3	3	Jordan Bird	United States	3:11.46	Q
4	3	Richard Colman	Australia	3:11.81	q
5	3	Kota Hokinoue	Japan	3:11.84	
6	3	Josh Cassidy	Canada	3:11.98	
7	3	Martin Velasco Soria	Mexico	3:12.61	
8	3	Alejandro Maldonado	Argentina	3:13.00	
9	1	Marcel Hug	Switzerland	3:16.83	Q
10	1	Saichon Konjen	Thailand	3:16.83	Q
11	1	Tomasz Hamerlak	Poland	3:17.00	Q
12	1	Alfonso Zaragoza	Mexico	3:17.06	
13	1	Pierre Fairbank	France	3:17.18	
14	1	Matthew Lack	New Zealand	3:17.42	
15	1	Jun Hiromichi	Japan	3:17.69	
16	1	Michel Filteau	Canada	3:17.92	
17	3	Ibrahim Salim Banihammad	United Arab Emirates	3:23.44	
18	1	Ryan Chalmers	United States	3:24.49	
19	2	David Weir	Great Britain	3:29.00	Q
20	2	Jean-Paul Compaore	Canada	3:30.55	Q
21	2	Jake Christopher Lappin	Australia	3:30.70	Q
22	2	Khachonsak Thamsophon	Thailand	3:30.93	
23	2	Alain Fuss	France	3:31.33	
24	2	Hiroyuki Yamamoto	Japan	3:31.69	
25	2	Ebbe Blichfeldt	Denmark	3:32.14	
26	2	Aaron Pike	United States	3:33.21	

==== Final ====
Rank	Name	Nationality	Time	Notes
1st place, gold medalist(s)	David Weir	Great Britain	3:10.93	
2nd place, silver medalist(s)	Marcel Hug	Switzerland	3:11.13	
3rd place, bronze medalist(s)	Saichon Konjen	Thailand	3:11.13	
4	Richard Colman	Australia	3:11.77	
5	Julien Casoli	France	3:11.92	
6	Jordan Bird	United States	3:12.80	
7	Prawat Wahoram	Thailand	3:13.04	
8	Jean-Paul Compaore	Canada	3:18.99	
9	Tomasz Hamerlak	Poland	3:23.10	
10	Jake Christopher Lappin	Australia	3:50.27	

===== Splits =====
Intermediate	Athlete	Country	Mark
400m	Marcel Hug	Switzerland	51.72
800m	Marcel Hug	Switzerland	1:44.85
1200m	Marcel Hug	Switzerland	2:36.90

== See also ==
- 2011 IPC Athletics World Championships – Men's pentathlon
- List of IPC world records in athletics
