= Vladimir Zayets =

Azerbaijani Paralympic athlete (born 1981)

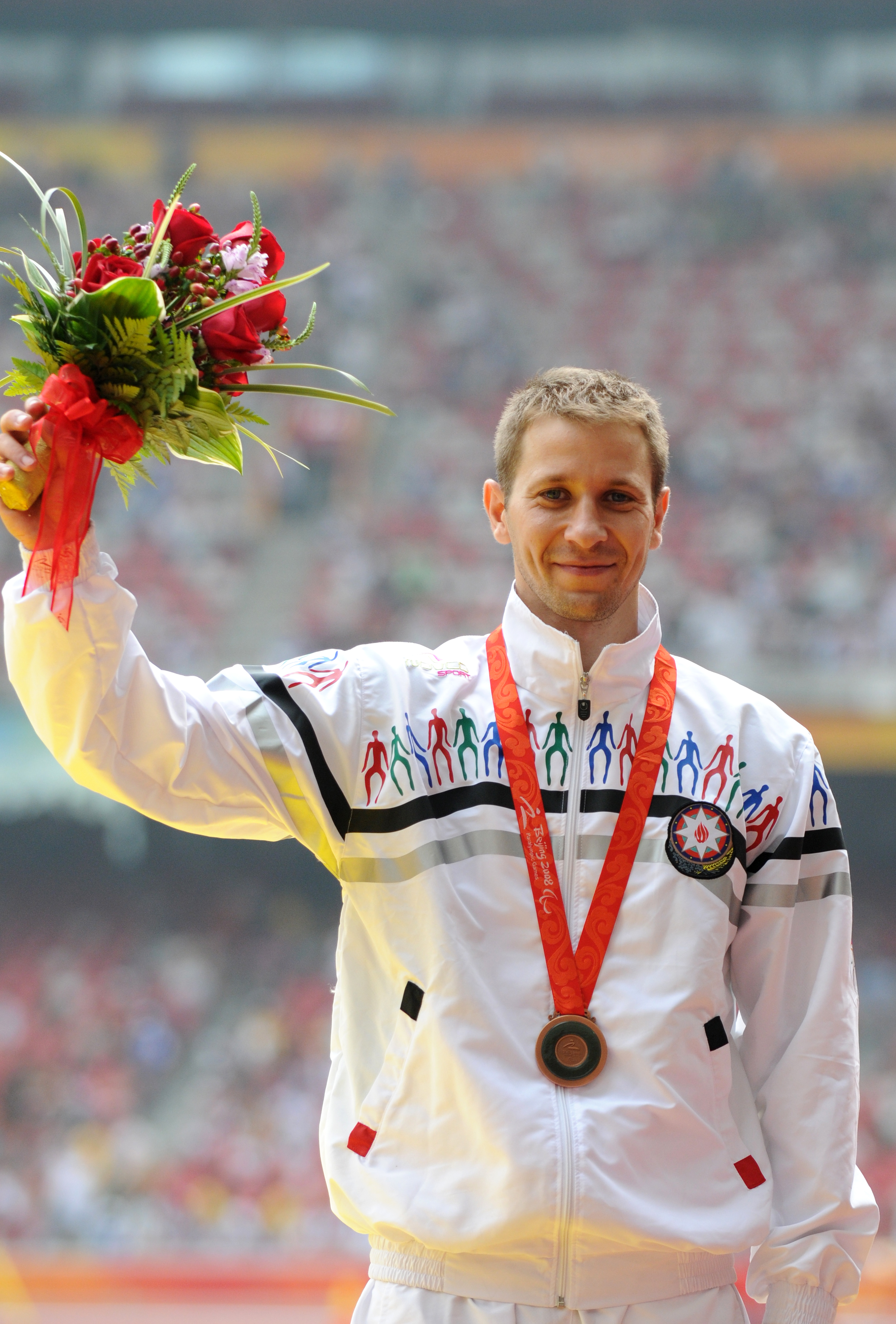
- Zayets at the 2008 Summer Paralympics

Medal record

Paralympic athletics

Representing Azerbaijan

Paralympic Games
Silver medal – second place	2012 London	Triple jump F12
Bronze medal – third place	2008 Beijing	Triple jump F12
Bronze medal – third place	2012 London	4 × 100 m relay

IPC World Championships
Gold medal – first place	2013 Lyon	Triple jump T12
Silver medal – second place	2006 Assen	Triple jump F12
Bronze medal – third place	2011 Christchurch	Triple jump F12

IPC European Championships
Gold medal – first place	2012 Stadskanaal	Triple jump T12

Vladimir Zayets (Azerbaijani: Vladimir Zayets, born 4 May 1981 in Baku, Azerbaijan SSR) is a Paralympian athlete from Azerbaijan competing mainly in category F12 triple jump events.

He competed in the 2008 Summer Paralympics in Beijing, China. There he won a bronze medal in the men's F12 triple jump event.

== Career ==
=== Coaching ===
At the 2024 Summer Paralympics held in Paris, Said Najafzade, coached by Zayets, won the gold medal. By the decree of the President of the Republic of Azerbaijan, Ilham Aliyev, on September 10, 2024, Vladimir Zayets was awarded the 2nd degree Order of Labor for his outstanding achievements at the 2024 Summer Paralympics and his contributions to the development of Azerbaijani sports. As Najafzade's coach, he was also awarded a cash prize of 100,000 manats.
