= 2011 IPC Athletics World Championships – Men's long jump =

The men's long jump at the 2011 IPC Athletics World Championships is held at the QEII Stadium on 22-23, 25-26 and 29 January

== Medalists ==
| Class | Gold | Silver | Bronze |
|---|---|---|---|
| F11 | Li Duan; China | Xavier Porras; Spain | Athanasios Barakas; Greece |
| F13 | Oleg Panyutin; Azerbaijan | Hilton Langenhoven; South Africa | Per Jonsson; Sweden |
| F20 | José António Exposito; Spain | Lenine Cunha; Portugal | Jacek Kolodziej; Poland |
| F36 | Vladimir Sviridov; Russia | Xu Ran; China | Mariusz Sobczak; Poland |
| F37/38 | Ma Yuxi; China | Mohamed Farhat Chida; Tunisia | Andriy Onufriyenko; Ukraine |
| F42 | Heinrich Popow; Germany | Wojtek Czyz; Germany | Atsushi Yamamoto; Japan |
| F44 | Markus Rehm; Germany | Andre Oliveira; Brazil | Casey Tibbs; United States |
| F46 | Arnaud Assoumani; France | Fadhil Al-Dabbagh; Iraq | Huseyn Hasanov; Azerbaijan |

== F42 ==
The Men's long jump, F42 was held on January 22

F42 = single above knee amputation or equivalent impairment.

=== Results ===
==== Final ====
| Rank | Athlete | Nationality | #1 | #2 | #3 | #4 | #5 | #6 | Result | Notes |
|---|---|---|---|---|---|---|---|---|---|---|
| 1st place, gold medalist(s) | Heinrich Popow | Germany | x | 5.90 | 5.92 | x | 6.23 | x | 6.23 | CR |
| 2nd place, silver medalist(s) | Wojtek Czyz | Germany | 6.02 | 5.14 | 5.90 | 5.84 | 6.14 | 5.96 | 6.14 | |
| 3rd place, bronze medalist(s) | Atsushi Yamamoto | Japan | 5.71 | - | 5.79 | x | 5.93 | x | 5.93 | AR |
| 4 | Kortney Clemons | United States | x | 3.96 | 4.41 | 4.59 | 4.25 | 3.29 | 4.59 | |
| 5 | Weizhong Guo | China | x | 4.20 | 4.41 | 4.46 | 4.38 | 4.45 | 4.46 | |

Key: CR = Championship Record, AR = Asian Record

== See also ==
- 2011 IPC Athletics World Championships – Men's pentathlon
- List of IPC world records in athletics
