= José Manuel González (athlete) =

Spanish Paralympic athlete

Personal information
- Full name: José Manuel González Santamaría
- Born: 19 September 1970 (age 55) Gijón, Asturias, Spain
Medal record
Men's para athletics (track & field)
Representing Spain
Paralympic Games
Silver medal – second place	1992 Barcelona	4×100 m relay C5–8
Bronze medal – third place	1992 Barcelona	200 metres - C8
Bronze medal – third place	1992 Barcelona	400 metres - C8
Bronze medal – third place	1996 Atlanta	400 metres - T37
World Championships
Bronze medal – third place	2006 Assen	1500 m T36
Bronze medal – third place	2011 Christchurch	800 m T36
Bronze medal – third place	2011 Christchurch	1500 m T36
European Championships
Bronze medal – third place	2014 Swansea	800 m T36

José Manuel González Santamaría (born 19 September 1970) is a paralympic athlete from Spain competing mainly in category T36 track events.

== Personal ==
González was born in Gijón, Asturias, Spain, on 19 September 1970 and lived in Tremañes, Asturias in 2012 The 2012 Asturias Day celebrations were held at the Asturian Parliament, and he was a participant in the awarding of the Medals of Asturias component, receiving a silver one for his Paralympic sportsmanship.

== Athletics ==
González is a T36 classified competitor. In March 2012, he medalled at the Spanish national disability championships.

=== Paralympics ===
González has competed in a total of six Summer Paralympics, first competing in the 1992 Games in Barcelona where he won bronze in the 200m and 400m C8 sprints and silver in the C5-C8 100m relay. In Atlanta in 1996 he again competed in the relay and 200m but his only medal was a second bronze in the 400m. This would prove to be his last medal as he failed to medal in the 400m or either relay in the 2000 Summer Paralympics, at the 2004 Summer Paralympics he competed in the 400m, 800m and 4 × 400 m relay and at the 2008 Summer Paralympics he competed in the 800m.

In May 2012, González was on the shortlist of Spanish sportspeople from Asturias likely to compete at the London Paralympics. Competing at the 2012 Summer Paralympics, he finished fifth in the 800 meters with a time of 2:15.99. He was one of four competitors from Asturias to compete at the Games.
