= 2011 IPC Athletics World Championships – Women's club throw =

The women's club throw at the 2011 IPC Athletics World Championships was held at the QEII Stadium on 22 January

- Classification F31/32/51: cerebral palsy, head injury, stroke, spinal cord injury or les autres

== Medalists ==
Class	Gold	Silver	Bronze
F31/32/51	Maroua Ibrahmi; Tunisia	Catherine Wayland; Ireland	Gemma Prescott; Great Britain

=== Results ===
==== Final ====
Rank	Athlete	Class	Nationality	#1	#2	#3	#4	#5	#6	Result	Points	Notes
1st place, gold medalist(s)	Maroua Ibrahmi	F32	Tunisia	12.49	21.08	17.86	13.29	7.46	8.69	21.08	1027	
2nd place, silver medalist(s)	Catherine Wayland	F51	Ireland	12.80	x	13.19	11.48	x	13.56	13.56	927	
3rd place, bronze medalist(s)	Gemma Prescott	F32	Great Britain	13.93	16.40	16.36	13.23	15.55	12.03	16.40	878	
4	Maria Stamatoula	F32	Greece	8.48	15.89	16.16	x	12.43	14.68	16.16	866	
5	Louise Ellery	F32	Australia	15.00	x	12.90	13.47	x	x	15.00	804	
6	Zena Cole	F51	United States	9.78	9.20	8.74	9.78	10.25	8.34	10.25	680	
7	Sakina Albalooshi	F32	United Arab Emirates	x	x	8.58	x	x	x	8.58	287	
	Mounia Gasmi	F32	Algeria	x	x	x	x	x	x	NM		

Key: NM = No Mark

== See also ==
- List of IPC world records in athletics
