= 2011 IPC Athletics World Championships – Men's marathon =

Marathon competition in New Zealand

The men's marathon at the 2011 IPC Athletics World Championships was held in the streets of Christchurch, New Zealand on 30 January.

British athlete David Weir, on January 29, pulled out of the marathon for safety reasons, as the roads around the circuit would not be closed to traffic. He was to compete in the classification T54 event.

British athlete and world record holder Richard Whitehead did not get to compete in a marathon event. He has a double leg amputation and is classified as T42. There was no T42 marathon event, because there were too few marathon runners with a single or double leg amputation. He was not allowed to run in the marathon T46 event (athletes with single above or below elbow amputation).

== Medalists ==
Class	Gold	Silver	Bronze
T11	Cristian Valenzuela; Chile	Andrea Cionna; Italy	Shinya Wada; Japan
T12	Alberto Suarez Laso; Spain	Elkin Alonso Serna Moreno; Colombia	Masahiro Okamura; Japan
T46	Mario Santillan Hernandez; Mexico	Tito Sena; Brazil	Ozivam Bonfim; Brazil
T54	Kurt Fearnley; Australia	Heinz Frei; Switzerland	Masazumi Soejima; Japan

== T11 ==
The Men's marathon, T11 was held on January 30

T11 = visual impairment: may range from no light perception in either eye to light perception with the inability to recognise the shape of a hand.

=== Results ===
Rank	Athlete	Nationality	Time	Notes
1st place, gold medalist(s)	Cristian Valenzuela	Chile	2:41:04	CR
2nd place, silver medalist(s)	Andrea Cionna	Italy	2:41:39	
3rd place, bronze medalist(s)	Shinya Wada	Japan	2:43:26	PB
4	Yuichi Takahashi	Japan	2:44:22	SB
5	Joaquim Machado	Portugal	2:44:38	PB
6	Yoshihide Hukuhara	Japan	2:54:36	
7	Carlos Ferreira	Portugal	2:55:38	

Key: CR = Championship Record, SB = Season Best, PB = Personal Best

== T12 ==
The Men's marathon, T12 was held on January 30

T12 = visual impairment: may recognise the shape of a hand and have a visual acuity of 2/60 and/or visual field of under 5 degrees.

=== Results ===
Rank	Athlete	Nationality	Time	Notes
1st place, gold medalist(s)	Alberto Suárez Laso	Spain	2:28:10	WR
2nd place, silver medalist(s)	Elkin Alonso Serna Moreno	Colombia	2:32:42	
3rd place, bronze medalist(s)	Masahiro Okamura	Japan	2:34:03	
4	Manuel Garnica Roldan	Spain	2:34:47	PB
5	Ildar Pomykalov	Russia	2:35:59	PB
6	Moises Beristain Gutierrez	Mexico	2:40:56	PB
7	Luis Enrique Herrera	Mexico	2:49:51	PB
8	Henry Cardenas	Costa Rica	3:44:35	
	Gabriel Macchi	Portugal	DNF	

Key: WR = World Record, PB = Personal Best

== T46 ==
The Men's marathon, T46 was held on January 30

T46 = single above or below elbow amputation or equivalent impairments.

=== Results ===
Rank	Athlete	Nationality	Time	Notes
1st place, gold medalist(s)	Mario Santillan Hernandez	Mexico	2:30:59	
2nd place, silver medalist(s)	Tito Sena	Brazil	2:32:01	
3rd place, bronze medalist(s)	Ozivam Bonfim	Brazil	2:33:50	SB
4	Walter Endrizzi	Italy	2:36:38	
5	Chris Hammer	United States	2:50:10	
6	Pedro Meza Zempoaltecatl	Mexico	2:53:16	
	Christoph Sommer	Switzerland	DNF	
	Frederic Van den Heede	Belgium	DNF	

== T54 ==
The Men's marathon, T54 was held on January 30

T54 = normal upper limb function, partial to normal trunk function, may have significant function of the lower limbs.

=== Results ===
Rank	Athlete	Nationality	Time	Notes
1st place, gold medalist(s)	Kurt Fearnley	Australia	1:31:09	
2nd place, silver medalist(s)	Heinz Frei	Switzerland	1:31:09	
3rd place, bronze medalist(s)	Masazumi Soejima	Japan	1:31:10	
4	Kota Hokinoue	Japan	1:31:10	
5	Roger Puigbo Verdaguer	Spain	1:31:10	SB
6	Ernst van Dyk	South Africa	1:31:10	
7	Pierre Fairbank	France	1:31:11	SB
8	Nobukazu Hanaoka	Japan	1:31:14	
9	Alain Fuss	France	1:34:24	
10	Tomasz Hamerlak	Poland	1:34:24	SB
11	Saul Mendoza Hernandez	Mexico	1:34:24	SB
12	Aaron Gordian Martinez	Mexico	1:34:25	
13	Rafael Botello Jimenez	Spain	1:34:27	SB
14	Masayuki Higuchi	Japan	1:36:09	
15	Jorge Madera	Spain	1:36:40	
16	Aron Andersson	Sweden	1:36:40	
17	Khachonsak Thamsophon	Thailand	1:36:40	
18	Ebbe Blichfeldt	Denmark	1:39:58	SB
19	Aaron Pike	United States	1:40:53	
20	Brett McArthur	Australia	1:42:14	
21	Hiroyuki Yamamoto	Japan	1:42:31	
22	Ekkachai Janthon	Thailand	1:45:40	
23	Sukhum Namlun	Thailand	1:47:09	
24	Ryan Chalmers	United States	1:49:05	
	Alberto Baptista	Portugal	DNF	
	Marcel Hug	Switzerland	DNF	
	Denis Lemeunier	France	DNF	
	Richard Nicholson	Australia	DNF	
	Alfonso Zaragoza	Mexico	DNF	
	Josh Cassidy	Canada	DNS	
	Jean-Paul Compaore	Canada	DNS	
	Michel Filteau	Canada	DNS	
	Kyle Shaw	Canada	DNS	
	David Weir	Great Britain	DNS	

Key: SB = Season Best, DNF = Did not Finish, DNS = Did not Start

== See also ==
- List of IPC world records in athletics
