= Marija Iveković-Meštrović =

Croatian Paralympic athlete (born 1981)

Marija Iveković
Personal information
- Full name: Marija Ivekovic-Meštrović
- Born: 13 May 1981 (age 45) Nova Gradiška, Yugoslavia
- Height: 1.71 m (5 ft 7 in)
- Weight: 69 kg (152 lb)

Sport
- Country: Croatia
- Sport: Paralympic athletics
- Disability class: T12, F12, P12
- Event(s): AK Agram, Zagreb, Croatia
Medal record
Paralympic athletics
Representing Croatia
World Championships
Gold medal – first place	2006 Assen	Long jump F12
Gold medal – first place	2011 Christchurch	Discus throw F12
Silver medal – second place	2002 Lille	Pentathlon P13
Bronze medal – third place	2006 Assen	Discus throw F12
Bronze medal – third place	2013 Lyon	Discus throw F11/12
European Championships
Gold medal – first place	2005 Espoo	Pentathlon P13
Silver medal – second place	2005 Espoo	Long jump T12
Bronze medal – third place	2005 Espoo	Discus throw F11/12
Bronze medal – third place	2014 Swansea	Discus throw F11/12

Marija Iveković-Meštrović (born 13 May 1981) is a Croatian former Paralympic athlete who competed at international track and field competitions. She competed in discus throw, long jump, pentathlon and sprinting events, she was a two-time World champion and a European champion. She lost most of her sight aged thirteen.
