= Atsushi Yamamoto =

Japanese Paralympic athlete

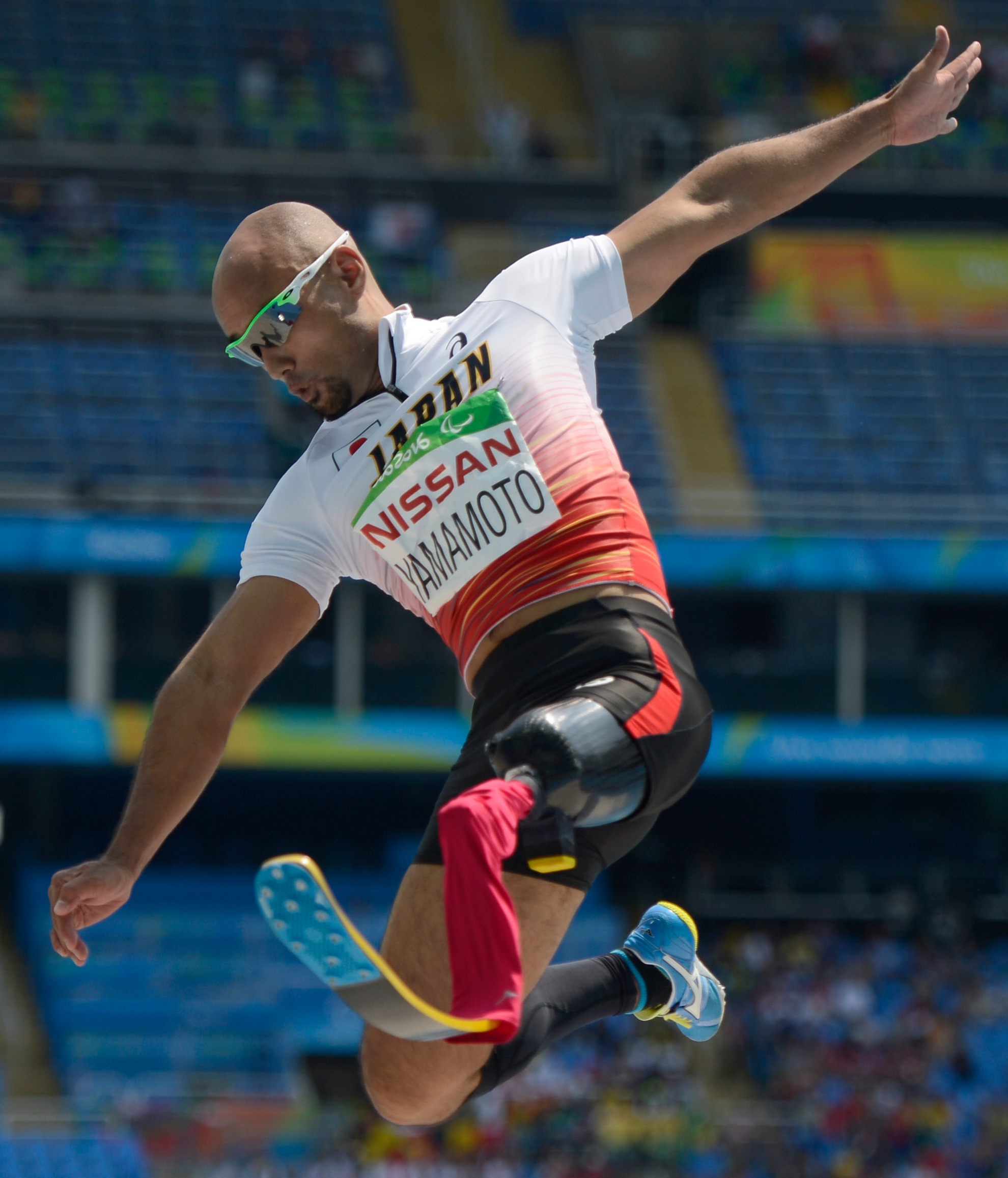
- Yamamoto at the 2016 Olympics

Personal information
- Native name: 山本篤
- Born: April 19, 1982 (age 44) Kakegawa, Shizuoka, Japan
- Height: 167 cm (5 ft 6 in)
- Website: Official website

Sport
- Sport: Paralympic athletics
- Disability class: T42
Medal record
Representing Japan
Paralympic Games
| Silver medal – second place | 2008 Beijing | Long jump F42/44 |
| Silver medal – second place | 2016 Rio de Janeiro | Long jump T42 |
| Bronze medal – third place | 2016 Rio de Janeiro | 4 × 100 m T42–47 |
IPC World Championships
| Gold medal – first place | 2013 Lyon | Long jump T42 |
| Gold medal – first place | 2015 Doha | Long jump T42 |
| Silver medal – second place | 2006 Assen | 4 × 100 m T42–46 |
| Bronze medal – third place | 2006 Assen | 100 m T42 |
| Bronze medal – third place | 2011 Christchurch | 100 m T42 |
| Bronze medal – third place | 2011 Christchurch | 200 m T42 |
| Bronze medal – third place | 2011 Christchurch | Long jump F42 |
Asian Para Games
| Gold medal – first place | 2010 Guangzhou | 100m T42 |
| Gold medal – first place | 2014 Incheon | 100m T42 |
| Gold medal – first place | 2014 Incheon | Long jump T42/44 |
- Updated on 6 February 2026

Atsushi Yamamoto (山本 篤, Yamamoto Atsushi, born April 19, 1982) is a leg amputee athlete from Japan competing mainly in category T42 sprint and long jump events. He won silver medals in the long jump at the 2008 and 2016 Paralympics.

Yamamoto also competed in snowboarding at the 2018 Winter Paralympics.

He competed in the men's long jump T63 event at the 2023 World Para Athletics Championships held in Paris, France.
