= Per Jonsson (athletics) =

Swedish Paralympic athlete

Personal information
- Nationality: Swedish
- Born: 10 February 1988 (age 38) Trollhättan, Sweden
- Height: 184 cm (6 ft 0 in)

Sport
- Country: Sweden
- Sport: Track and field
- Disability class: (F13)
- Event(s): Long jump, sprint
- Club: Bollnas FIK
- Coached by: Hansa Nasman (club); Magnus Olsson (national)
Medal record
Paralympic athletics
Representing Sweden
IPC World Championships
Gold medal – first place	2015 Doha	Long jump - T13
Bronze medal – third place	2013 Lyon	Long jump- F13
Bronze medal – third place	2013 Lyon	Long jump - T13
IPC European Championships
Gold medal – first place	2014 Swansea	Long jump - T13
Gold medal – first place	2016 Grosseto	Long jump - T12

Per Jonsson (born 10 February 1988) is a Paralympic athlete from Sweden who competes in F13 classification track and field events. Jonsson has represented Sweden at both the 2008 Summer Paralympics in Beijing and the 2012 Summer Paralympics in London, competing in the 100m sprint and the long jump. Jonsson has won both the World and European Championship titles in his sport, winning the long jump T13 World title in Doha in 2015.
