= 2011 IPC Athletics World Championships – Men's triple jump =

The men's triple jump at the 2011 IPC Athletics World Championships was held at the QEII Stadium on 22 and 26 January 2011.

== Medalists ==
Class	Gold	Silver	Bronze
F11	Li Duan; China	Andrey Koptev; Russia	Elexis Gillette; United States
F12	Oleg Panyutin; Azerbaijan	Ivan Kytsenko; Ukraine	Vladimir Zayets; Azerbaijan
F46	Huseyn Hasanov; Azerbaijan	Fadhil Al-Dabbagh; Iraq	Hiroyuki Yasui; Japan
