= 2011 IPC Athletics World Championships – Men's high jump =

The men's high jump at the 2011 IPC Athletics World Championships was held at the QEII Stadium on 27–29 January.

== Medalists ==
Class	Gold	Silver	Bronze
F13	Ihar Fartunau; Belarus	Ivan Kytsenko; Ukraine	Braedon Samuel Dolfo; Canada
F42	Weizhong Guo; China	Iliesa Delana; Fiji	Xiaowen Li; China
F46	Maciej Lepiato; Poland	Hongjie Chen; China	
F46	Maciej Lepiato; Poland	Jeff Skiba; United States	

== F13 ==
The Men's high jump, F13 was held on January 28

- Classification F13 - visual impairment
  - F13: visual acuity ranges from 2/60 to 6/60 and/or visual field over 5 degrees and less than 20 degrees.

The event also included athletes with a F12 classification - visual impairment

- F12: may recognise the shape of a hand and have a visual acuity of 2/60 and/or visual field of less than 5 degrees.

=== Results ===
==== Final ====
Rank	Name	Nationality	1.55	1.60	1.65	1.70	1.75	1.80	1.83	1.86	1.89	1.92	Result	Notes
1st place, gold medalist(s)	Ihar Fartunau	Belarus	-	-	-	o	o	o	o	o	o	xo	1.92	
2nd place, silver medalist(s)	Ivan Kytsenko	Ukraine	-	o	o	o	o	o	o	xxo	o	xx-	1.89	CR
3rd place, bronze medalist(s)	Braedon Samuel Dolfo	Canada	-	-	o	o	o	xo	o	xxx			1.83	SB
4	Siarhei Burdukou	Belarus	-	o	o	o	xxx						1.70	
	Brandon King	Canada	xxx										NM	

Key: CR = Championship Record, SB = Season Best, NM = No Mark

== F42 ==
The Men's high jump, F42 was held on January 29

- F42 = single above knee amputation or equivalent impairments.

=== Results ===
==== Final ====
Rank	Name	Nationality	1.45	1.50	1.55	1.60	1.65	1.70	1.73	1.76	1.79	Result	Notes
1st place, gold medalist(s)	Weizhong Guo	China	-	-	o	o	xxo	o	o	o		1.76	SB
2nd place, silver medalist(s)	Iliesa Delana	Fiji	o	o	o	o	o	o	o	xxx		1.73	AR
3rd place, bronze medalist(s)	Xiaowen Li	China	-	o	o	o	o	xo	xxx			1.70	
4	Lukasz Maciej Mamczarz	Poland	-	-	xo	xo	xxx					1.60	
5	Marcel Jaroslawski	Poland	o	o	xxx							1.50	
5	Dennis Wliszczak	Austria	o	o	xxx							1.50	
7	Sanjay Kumar	India	xo	xo	xxx							1.50	

Key: SB = Seasonal best, AR = Area Record

== F46 ==
The Men's high jump, F46 was held on January 27

F46 = single above or below elbow amputation, or equivalent impairment.

=== Results ===
==== Final ====
Rank	Name	Nationality	1.70	1.75	1.80	1.85	1.90	1.93	1.96	1.99	2.02	Result	Notes
1st place, gold medalist(s)	Maciej Lepiato	Poland	-	-	o	-	o	-	o	o	o	2.02	AR
2nd place, silver medalist(s)	Hongjie Chen	China	-	-	-	o	-	o	o	xxx		1.96	SB
2nd place, silver medalist(s)	Jeff Skiba	United States	-	-	-	o	-	o	o	xxx		1.96	SB
4	Reinhold Boetzel	Germany	-	o	o	o	xxx					1.85	SB
5	Toru Suzuki	Japan	-	-	o	-	xxx					1.80	
6	Junfeng Shang	China	xo	o	xxx							1.75	SB

Key: AR = Area Record, SB = Seasonal best

== See also ==
- List of IPC world records in athletics
