= Branimir Budetić =

Croatian Paralympic athlete (born 1990)

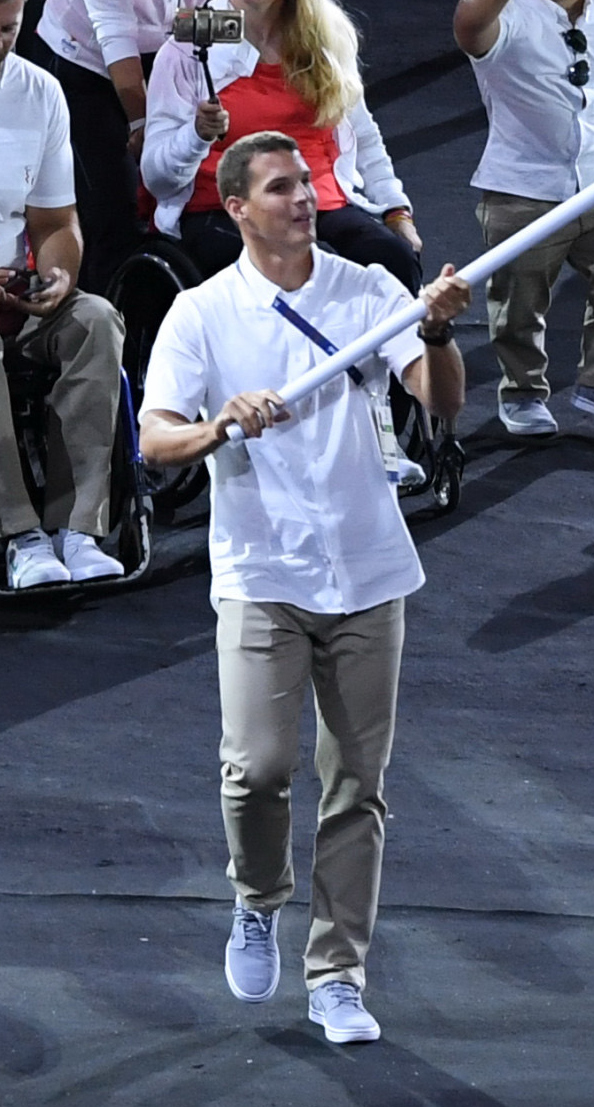
- Budetić as flag bearer for Croatia at the 2016 Summer Paralympics Parade of Nations

Personal information
- Born: 20 April 1990 (age 36) Zagreb, SR Croatia, SFR Yugoslavia

Sport
- Country: Croatia
- Sport: Paralympic athletics
- Disability class: F12
- Event: Javelin throw
- Club: AK Agram
Medal record
Representing Croatia
Paralympic Games
Silver medal – second place	2008 Beijing	Javelin throw F11/12
Bronze medal – third place	2012 London	Javelin throw F12/13
IPC Athletics World Championships
Gold medal – first place	2015 Doha	Javelin F13
Silver medal – second place	2011 Christchurch	Pentathlon P11−13
Silver medal – second place	2013 Lyon	Javelin F12/13
Bronze medal – third place	2013 Lyon	Discus F12
IPC Athletics European Championships
Gold medal – first place	2016 Grosseto	Javelin throw F13
Bronze medal – third place	2012 Stadskanaal	Javelin throw F12/13

Branimir Budetić (born 20 April 1990) is a Paralympic athlete from Croatia. He competed in the javelin throw at the 2008, 2012 and 2016 Paralympics and finished second, third and fourth, respectively.
