= Alberto Suárez Laso =

Spanish Paralympic athlete (born 1977)

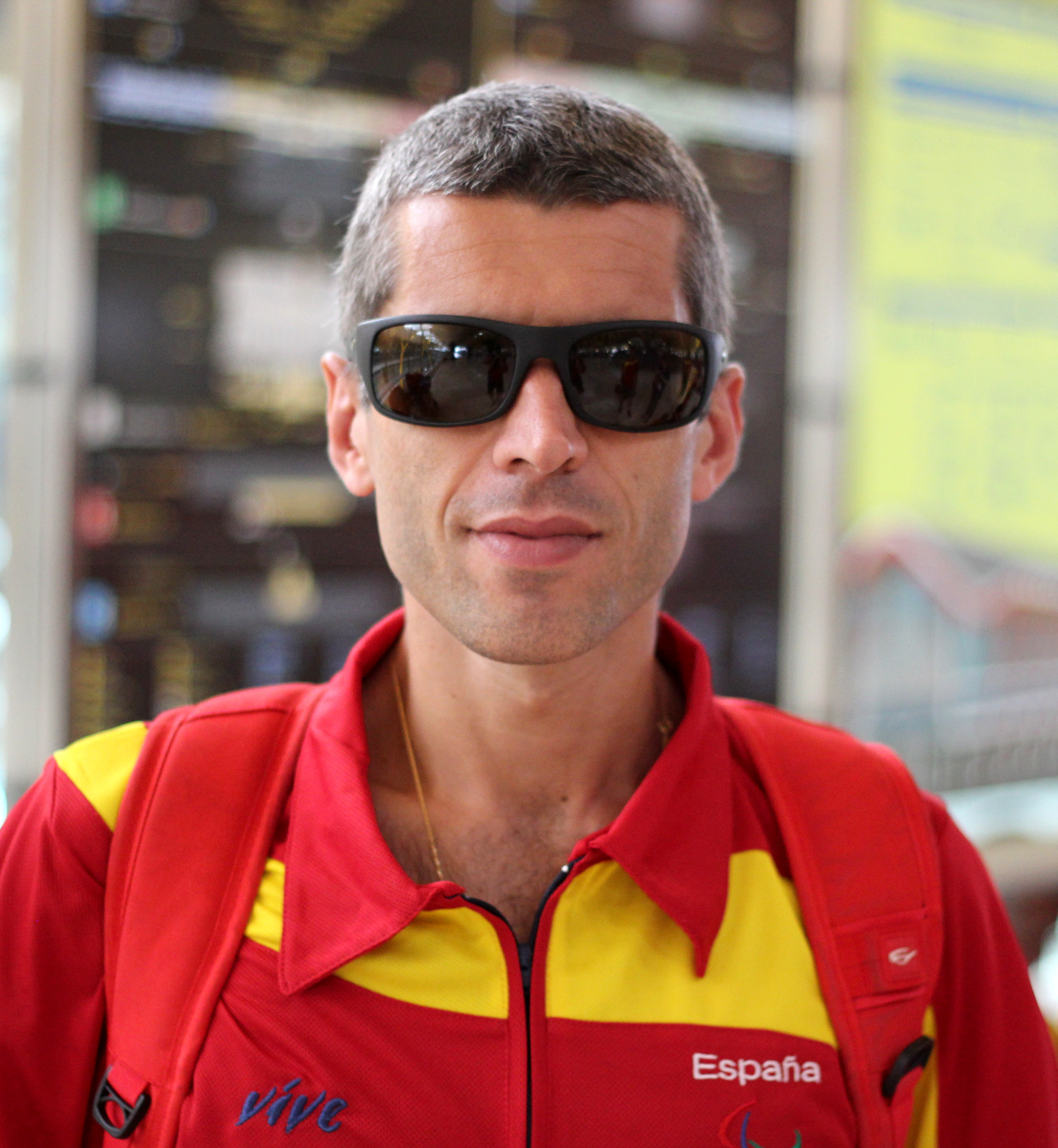
- Suárez in 2013

Personal information
- Full name: Alberto Suárez Laso
- Nationality: Spanish
- Born: 19 December 1977 (age 48) Riosa, Asturias, Spain

Sport
- Country: Spain
- Sport: Track and field (T12)
Medal record
Men's para-athletics)
Representing Spain
Paralympic Games
Gold medal – first place	2012 London	Marathon T12
Silver medal – second place	2016 Rio de Janeiro	Marathon T12
Silver medal – second place	2024 Paris	Marathon T12
IPC World Championships
Gold medal – first place	2011 Christchurch	Marathon T13
Silver medal – second place	2015 Doha	5,000m T13
Bronze medal – third place	2011 Christchurch	10,000m T13
IPC European Championships
Gold medal – first place	2012 Stadskanaal	5000m T13
Gold medal – first place	2014 Swansea	5000m T13

Alberto Suárez Laso (born 19 December 1977) is a T12 athlete from Spain who competes in long-distance events like the 5,000 meters, 10,000 meters, half marathon and marathon. He is a world record holder in the men's T12 marathon, winning gold in the event at the 2011 IPC Athletics World Championships and the 2012 Summer Paralympics.

== Personal ==
Suárez was born 19 December 1977, in Riosa, Asturias, Spain. As of 2012, he resides in Oviedo, Asturias. He has a vision impairment.

At the 2011 Asturian Best Sportspersons awards organized by the Asturian Sports Press Association, Suárez won an award related to human values. The following year, in 2012, he won the Asturian Sports Press Association award for best male athlete. In 2013, he was awarded the gold Real Orden al Mérito Deportivo.

== Athletics ==
Suárez is a T12, visually impaired runner, and often competes against runners without disabilities. He is a member of the Laso Oviedo Athletics Club, and, As of 2012, he is coached by Chus Castaño. He is a world record in the marathon for his classification.

Suárez participated in the 2011 Gran Fondo Siete Aguas International Trophy President of the Council of Valencia. He competed in the 2011 Spanish Paralympic national athletics championships held in Gijón. He competed in the 2011 IPC Athletics World Championships in Christchurch New Zealand where he was one of two Spanish competitors in the marathon. He finished the marathon with a gold medal and world record time of 2.28:10. He also earned a bronze medal in the men's T12 10,000 meter race.

Going into the 2012 athletics season, Suárez's goal for it was to win a gold medal at the 2012 London Paralympics in the marathon. In 2012, he was a recipient of a Plan ADO €23,000 athlete scholarship with a €3,000 reserve and a €2,500 coaching scholarship. He participated in the 2012 Riosa Sports Days. Prior to the start of the London Games, he trained with several other visually impaired Spanish track and field athletes in Logroño. In May 2012, he was on the shortlist of Spanish sportspeople from Asturias likely to compete at the London Paralympics.

Competing in the European Championships in June 2012, he finished in first place in the T12 5,000 meters with a time of 15:23.60.

He competed at the 2012 Summer Paralympics, where he won a gold medal in the men's T12 marathon and finished sixth in the men's T12 5,000 meter event. His gold medal was Spain's eighth gold of the Games. He finished the marathon in a time of 2:24.50, which was a new Paralympic Games and World Record.

Suárez finished 6th in the 2013 Barcelona half marathon while setting a personal best time in the distance and competing against able bodied athletes. He competed in the 2013 Divina Pastora 8 km Orotava held in the Canary Islands. Prior to race day, he gave a presentation connected to the event about physical activity, sport and eating patterns for athletes. In July 2013, he participated in the 2013 IPC Athletics World Championships.
