= 2011 IPC Athletics World Championships – Women's javelin throw =

The women's javelin throw at the 2011 IPC Athletics World Championships was held at the QEII Stadium from 24–28 January

== Medalists ==
Class	Gold	Silver	Bronze
F13	Tanja Dragić; Serbia	Tatiana de Tovar Briceno; Venezuela	Jessica Gallagher; Australia
F33/34/52/53	Birgit Kober; Germany	Lucyna Kornobys; Poland	Louadjeda Benoumessad; Algeria
F38	Shirlene Coelho; Brazil	Qianqian Jia; China	Ramune Adomaitiene; Lithuania
F46	Madeleine Hogan; Australia	Natalia Gudkova; Russia	Hollie Beth Arnold; Great Britain
F54/55/56	Hania Aidi; Tunisia	Martina Willing; Germany	Ntombizanele Situ; South Africa
F57/58	Jeny Velazco Reyes; Mexico	Safia Djelal; Algeria	Mary Nakhumica; Kenya

== F13 ==
The Women's javelin throw, F13 was held on January 24 with the medal ceremony on January 25

- Classification F13 - visual impairment
  - F12: may recognise the shape of a hand and have a visual acuity of 2/60 and/or visual field of less than 5 degrees.
  - F13: visual acuity ranges from 2/60 to 6/60 and/or visual field over 5 degrees and less than 20 degrees.

=== Results ===
==== Final ====
Rank	Athlete	Nationality	#1	#2	#3	#4	#5	#6	Result	Notes
1st place, gold medalist(s)	Tanja Dragić	Serbia	35.49	35.97	36.20	36.49	36.74	36.43	36.74	WR
2nd place, silver medalist(s)	Tatiana de Tovar Briceno	Venezuela	x	34.58	31.83	x	34.52	30.34	34.58	SB
3rd place, bronze medalist(s)	Jessica Gallagher	Australia	33.75	31.41	x	33.72	33.36	30.95	33.75	SB
4	Natallia Eder	Austria	26.65	27.95	32.09	32.77	30.21	32.31	32.77	SB
5	Marija Vidacek	Croatia	27.15	29.40	x	30.69	29.73	x	30.69	SB
6	Rebeca Valenzuela Álvarez	Mexico	25.81	27.67	x	x	26.89	x	27.67	SB
7	Orysia Ilchyna	Ukraine	24.02	16.68	22.93	24.43	27.42	x	27.42	
8	Carmen Mentor	South Africa	26.08	21.35	19.95	18.82	22.14	19.75	26.08	SB
9	Sofya Romashevskaya	Russia	18.37	18.74	17.65				18.74	

Key: WR = World Record, CR = Championship Record

== F33/34/52/53 ==
The Women's javelin throw, F33/34/52/53 was held on January 28

- Classification F33/34/52/53
  - F33: some degree of trunk movement when pushing a wheelchair, limited forward trunk movement during forceful pushing. Throwing movements mainly from the arm. Compete in a wheelchair or from a throwing frame.
  - F34: good functional strength, minimal limitation or control problems in arms or trunk. Compete in a wheelchair or from a throwing frame.
  - F52: good shoulder, elbow and wrist function, poor to normal finger flexion and extension, no trunk or leg function.
  - F53: normal upper limb function, no abdominal, leg or lower spinal function.

=== Results ===
==== Final ====
Rank	Athlete	Nationality	#1	#2	#3	#4	#5	#6	Result	Notes	
1st place, gold medalist(s)	Birgit Kober	Germany	23.46	23.04	23.54	21.48	23.10	22.51	23.54	1227	WR
2nd place, silver medalist(s)	Lucyna Kornobys	Poland	14.09	13.12	13.37	12.01	11.52	12.02	14.09	988	
3rd place, bronze medalist(s)	Louadjeda Benoumessad	Algeria	15.05	16.60	16.37	14.89	16.79	16.40	16.79	955	
4	Marjaana Huovinen	Finland	x	16.42	15.99	x	x	x	16.42	932	
5	Frances Herrmann	Germany	14.91	15.36	15.32	15.20	14.80	16.40	16.40	931	
6	Birgit Pohl	Germany	15.83	15.42	15.75	15.44	15.52	x	15.83	894	
7	Thuraya Alzaabi	United Arab Emirates	13.90	x	x	12.11	x	14.41	14.41	791	
8	Jessica Hamill	New Zealand	x	14.35	x	13.98	x	13.97	14.35	787	AR
9	Esther Rivera	Mexico	x	10.59	10.32				10.59	664	
10	Aishah Salem Bani Khaled	United Arab Emirates	8.62	x	x				8.62	469	
11	Robyn Stawski	United States	7.40	7.91	8.05				8.05	407	
12	Shaikhah Alfoudari	Kuwait	9.10	9.02	9.08				9.10	337	
13	Deepa Malik	India	7.41	6.58	7.16				7.41	327	
	Elena Burdykina	Russia	x	x	x				NM		

Key: WR = World Record, AR = Area Record, NM = No Mark

== F38 ==
The Women's javelin throw, F38 was held on January 26

- Classification F38 - meet the minimum disability criteria for athletes with cerebral palsy, head injury or stroke, a limitation in function that impacts sports performance.

=== Results ===
==== Final ====
Rank	Athlete	Nationality	#1	#2	#3	#4	#5	#6	Result	Notes
1st place, gold medalist(s)	Shirlene Coelho	Brazil	31.83	32.50	32.85	32.22	x	31.57	32.85	CR
2nd place, silver medalist(s)	Qianqian Jia	China	27.72	29.41	26.09	x	29.46	x	29.46	
3rd place, bronze medalist(s)	Ramune Adomaitiene	Lithuania	23.40	x	28.63	x	28.32	x	28.63	CR
4	Mi Na	China	25.76	26.26	26.78	x	25.24	23.17	26.78	
5	Daniela Vratilova	Czech Republic	25.69	24.76	22.99	24.71	23.61	24.22	25.69	
6	Viktorya Yasevych	Ukraine	25.15	x	x	x	x	x	25.15	AR
7	Georgia Beikoff	Australia	20.50	22.50	21.63	24.72	22.81	22.74	24.72	AR
8	Svetlana Sergeeva	Russia	21.25	21.07	22.87	22.21	20.51	22.44	22.87	
9	Eva Berna	Czech Republic	19.72	18.47	20.76				20.76	
10	Yomaira Cohen	Venezuela	x	17.88	20.61				20.61	
11	Qiuping Xu	China	20.16	x	19.70				20.16	
12	Renee Danielle Foessel	Canada	17.52	18.42	18.73				18.73	
13	Julie Crisp	United States	17.61	x	17.10				17.61	

Key: CR = Championship Record, AR = Area Record

== F46 ==
The Women's javelin throw, F46 was held on January 28

- Classification F46 - single above or below elbow amputation or equivalent impairment.

=== Results ===
==== Final ====
Rank	Athlete	Nationality	#1	#2	#3	#4	#5	#6	Result	Notes
1st place, gold medalist(s)	Madeleine Hogan	Australia	36.25	x	36.72	36.67	37.79	36.91	37.79	CR
2nd place, silver medalist(s)	Natalia Gudkova	Russia	33.05	33.65	31.69	x	x	x	33.65	
3rd place, bronze medalist(s)	Hollie Arnold	Great Britain	32.45	28.58	29.74	29.47	30.84	31.99	32.45	
4	Katarzyna Piekart	Poland	29.03	x	31.28	31.91	30.03	x	31.91	
5	Holly Robinson	New Zealand	28.80	x	30.44	29.51	25.84	x	30.44	
6	Mariel Bethancourt	Venezuela	27.49	x	25.03	27.35	28.47	27.81	28.47	
7	Mariam Matroushi	United Arab Emirates	25.01	24.74	x	24.58	23.26	25.44	25.44	

Key: CR = Championship Record

== F54/55/56 ==
The Women's javelin throw, F54/55/56 was held on January 27

- Classification F54/55/56
  - F54 - normal upper limb function, no abdominal or lower spinal function.
  - F55 - normal upper limb function, may have partial to almost normal trunk function, no leg function.
  - F56 - normal upper limb and trunk function, some leg function, may have high bilateral above knee amputation.

=== Results ===
==== Final ====
Rank	Athlete	Nationality	#1	#2	#3	#4	#5	#6	Result	Points	Notes
1st place, gold medalist(s)	Hania Aidi	Tunisia	16.14	17.27	16.67	15.57	16.48	17.05	17.27	1001	WR
2nd place, silver medalist(s)	Martina Willing	Germany	21.88	x	22.65	22.22	22.21	22.27	22.65	961	
3rd place, bronze medalist(s)	Ntombizanele Situ	South Africa	15.25	x	x	14.26	x	x	15.25	914	
4	Daniela Todorova	Bulgaria	x	x	17.77	17.44	x	19.10	19.10	871	SB
5	Tatjana Majcen	Slovenia	x	13.44	x	13.50	14.17	x	14.17	853	AR
6	Tanja Cerkvenik	Slovenia	17.73	x	x	16.59	18.33	x	18.33	835	
7	Marianne Buggenhagen	Germany	15.90	16.36	16.60	15.93	15.71	16.70	16.70	749	SB
8	Feixia Dong	China	13.12	14.78	14.28	14.51	14.32	14.23	14.78	629	

Key: WR = World Record, SB = Season Best, AR = Area Record

== F57/58 ==
The Women's javelin throw, F57/58 was held on January 25

- Classification F57/58
  - F57: normal upper limb and trunk function, may have bilateral above knee amputations.
  - F58: normal upper limb and trunk function, bilateral below knee amputation or single above knee amputation.

=== Results ===
==== Final ====
Rank	Athlete	Nationality	#1	#2	#3	#4	#5	#6	Result	Points	Notes
1st place, gold medalist(s)	Jeny Velazco Reyes	Mexico	27.17	26.66	29.02	26.53	x	29.21	29.21	961	
2nd place, silver medalist(s)	Safia Djelal	Algeria	26.98	x	26.92	26.91	x	x	26.98	903	
3rd place, bronze medalist(s)	Mary Nakhumica	Kenya	19.30	x	18.23	x	17.75	20.35	20.35	842	
4	Olga Sergienko	Russia	x	x	19.53	x	x	x	19.53	804	
5	Leilei Gao	China	21.54	22.50	22.39	22.87	23.30	x	23.30	770	
6	Ling Li	China	13.10	16.59	13.50	13.88	17.24	9.42	17.24	675	
7	Catherine Callahan	United States	16.04	15.07	15.29	14.38	11.77	14.28	16.04	595	
8	Nadia Medjmedj	Algeria	15.51	14.32	15.78	12.92	14.06	14.54	15.78	577	
9	Ivanka Koleva	Bulgaria	13.50	14.61	14.12				14.61	492	
10	Siham Alrasheedy	United Arab Emirates	13.85	x	13.46				13.85	435	
11	Katalin Szmrtnik	Hungary	13.15	12.85	12.64				13.15	382	

Key: WR = World Record, SB = Season Best, AR = Area Record

== See also ==
- List of IPC world records in athletics
