= Catherine O'Neill =

Catherine O'Neill may refer to:

- Catherine O'Neill (cricketer) (born 1970), New Zealand born Irish cricketer
- Catherine O'Neill (athlete) (born 1975), Paralympian athlete from Ireland
- Catherine O'Neill, Countess of Tyrone, Irish aristocrat
