= 2011 IPC Athletics World Championships – Men's 10,000 metres =

The men's 10000 metres at the 2011 IPC Athletics World Championships was held at the QEII Stadium from 22–23 January

== Medalists ==
Class	Gold	Silver	Bronze
T54	Marcel Hug; Switzerland	Kota Hokinoue; Japan	Prawat Wahoram; Thailand

== T54 ==
The Men's 10000 metres, T54 was held on January 22

T54 = normal upper limb function, partial to normal trunk function. May have significant function of the lower limbs.

=== Results ===
==== Final ====
Rank	Name	Nationality	Time	Notes
1st place, gold medalist(s)	Marcel Hug	Switzerland	22:16.83	
2nd place, silver medalist(s)	Kota Hokinoue	Japan	22:17.20	
3rd place, bronze medalist(s)	Prawat Wahoram	Thailand	22:17.30	
4	Josh Cassidy	Canada	22:18.21	
5	Martin Velasco Soria	Mexico	23:51.67	
	Aaron Gordian Martinez	Mexico	DNF	
	Denis Lemeunier	France	DNF	

===== Splits =====
Intermediate	Athlete	Country	Mark
1000m	Prawat Wahoram	Thailand	2:12.08
2000m	Marcel Hug	Switzerland	4:19.99
3000m	Kota Hokinoue	Japan	6:34.27
4000m	Prawat Wahoram	Thailand	8:50.11
5000m	Josh Cassidy	Canada	11:01.66
6000m	Marcel Hug	Switzerland	13:16.30
7000m	Marcel Hug	Switzerland	15:29.34
8000m	Josh Cassidy	Canada	17:42.96
9000m	Marcel Hug	Switzerland	19:58.88

== See also ==
- List of IPC world records in athletics
