= Huseyn Hasanov (athlete) =

Azerbaijani Paralympic athlete

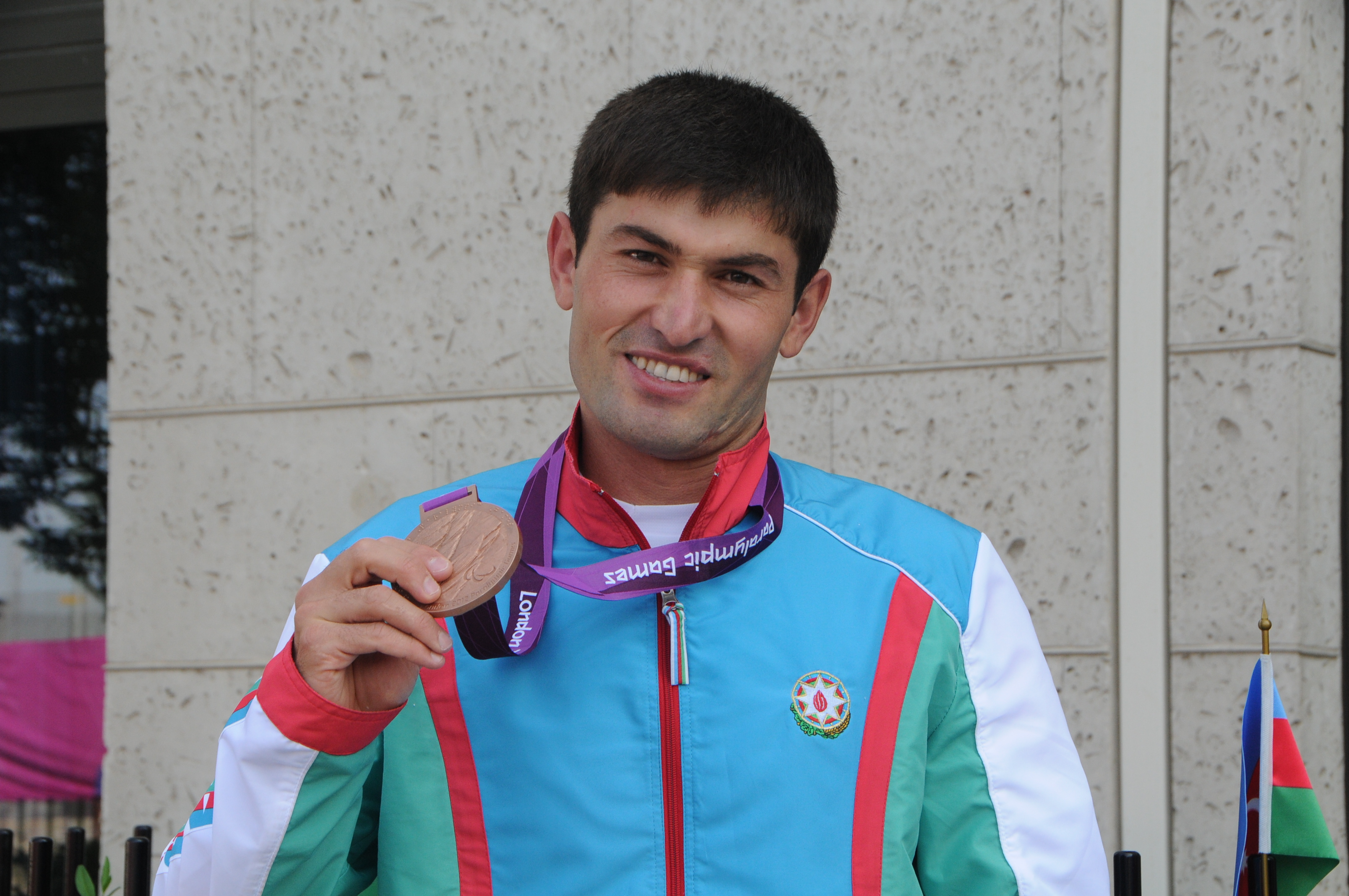

Personal information
- Born: 26 September 1986 (age 39)

Sport
- Country: Azerbaijan
- Sport: Athletics
- Disability class: T47
- Event(s): long jump, triple jump
Medal record
Track and field
Representing Azerbaijan
Paralympic Games
| Bronze medal – third place | 2012 London | long jump - T46 |
IPC World Championships
| Gold medal – first place | 2011 Christchurch | triple jump - T46 |
| Bronze medal – third place | 2011 Christchurch | long jump - T46 |

Huseyn Hasanov (born 26 September 1986) is a Paralympian athlete from Azerbaijan competing mainly in T46 classification track and field events.

Hasanov represented his country at the 2012 Summer Paralympics in London, where he competed in two events, the long jump and triple jump. He finished on the podium in the long jump, taking the bronze medal but was unable to improve on his first jump of 13.74 in the triple jump leaving him in fourth place. As well as Paralympic success, Hasanov has medaled at the IPC World Championships winning gold in the triple jump at the 2011 World Championships in Christchurch.

Hasanov has been recognized several times by his country for services to athletics. In 2009 he was named Paralympic Athlete of the Year in Azerbaijan, and after winning his Paralympic bronze mdalin London he was awarded the Taraggi Medal by then president Ilham Aliyev.
