= 2011 IPC Athletics World Championships – Men's club throw =

The men's club throw at the 2011 IPC Athletics World Championships was held at the QEII Stadium on 25 January

- Classification F31/32/51: cerebral palsy, head injury, stroke, spinal cord injury or les autres

== Medalists ==
Class	Gold	Silver	Bronze
F31/32/51	Lahouari Bahlaz; Algeria	Radim Beles; Czech Republic	Stephen Miller; Great Britain

=== Results ===
KEY:	WR	World record	CR	Championship Record	SB	Seasonal best

==== Final ====
Rank	Athlete	Nationality	#1	#2	#3	#4	#5	#6	Result	Notes
1st place, gold medalist(s)	Lahouari Bahlaz	Algeria	x	32.56	31.32	36.73	33.97	29.44	36.73	WR
2nd place, silver medalist(s)	Radim Beles	Czech Republic	23.70	x	25.22	24.70	24.65	x	25.22	CR
3rd place, bronze medalist(s)	Stephen Miller	Great Britain	27.99	27.47	29.19	28.19	28.90	31.25	31.25	
4	Karim Bettina	Algeria	29.59	30.35	28.01	27.48	29.51	30.61	30.61	SB
5	Jan Vanek	Czech Republic	23.42	23.21	21.48	21.45	21.23	22.99	23.42	SB
6	Frantisek Serbus	Czech Republic	x	26.25	x	x	x	x	26.25	
7	Thomas Green	Great Britain	23.25	25.05	17.91	22.97	23.68	x	25.05	
8	Joze Flere	Slovenia	21.05	19.71	20.45	x	x	20.64	21.05	

== See also ==
- List of IPC world records in athletics
