= 2012 IPC Athletics European Championships – Men's triple jump =

The men's triple jump at the 2012 IPC Athletics European Championships was held at Stadskanaal Stadium from 24–29 July.

== Medalists ==
Results given by IPC Athletics.

Class	Gold	Silver	Bronze
T11	Denis Gulin; Russia	N/A	N/A
T12	Vladimir Zayets; Azerbaijan	Siarhei Burdukou; Belarus	Ivan Kytsenko; Ukraine
T46	Aliaksandr Subota; Belarus	Antonio Andujar Arroyo; Spain	N/A

== Results ==
=== F11 ===
Rank	Class	Athlete	1	2	3	4	5	6	Best	Notes
1st place, gold medalist(s)	F11	Denis Gulin; Russia	12.93	12.95	13.20	X	X	X	13.20	SB
2	F11	Ruslan Katyshev; Ukraine	11.24	11.54	11.51	X	X	11.51	11.54	

=== F12 ===
Rank	Class	Athlete	1	2	3	4	5	6	Best	Notes
1st place, gold medalist(s)	F12	Vladimir Zayets; Azerbaijan	14.88	X	15.00	12.44	14.76	15.08	15.08	SB
2nd place, silver medalist(s)	F12	Siarhei Burdukou; Belarus	13.12	13.51	X	X	13.62	13.86	13.86	SB
3rd place, bronze medalist(s)	F12	Ivan Kytsenko; Ukraine	13.43	13.83	X	X	X	X	13.83	
4	F12	Evgeny Kegelev; Russia	13.24	13.37	13.82	13.14	13.31	13.46	13.82	SB
5	F12	Sergii Mykhailov; Ukraine	X	12.78	12.68	13.05	12.86	13.25	13.25	
—	F12	Oleg Panyutin; Azerbaijan	X	X	X				NM	

=== F46 ===
Rank	Class	Athlete	1	2	3	4	5	6	Best	Notes
1st place, gold medalist(s)	F46	Aliaksandr Subota; Belarus	12.91	13.16	13.04	13.33	13.20	13.30	13.33	
2nd place, silver medalist(s)	F46	Antonio Andujar Arroyo; Spain	12.33	12.18	12.31	12.73	12.96	13.04	13.04	
3	F46	David Bravo; Spain	11.46	X	X	X	X	X	11.46	

== See also ==
- List of IPC world records in athletics
