= Hilton Langenhoven =

South African Paralympic athlete

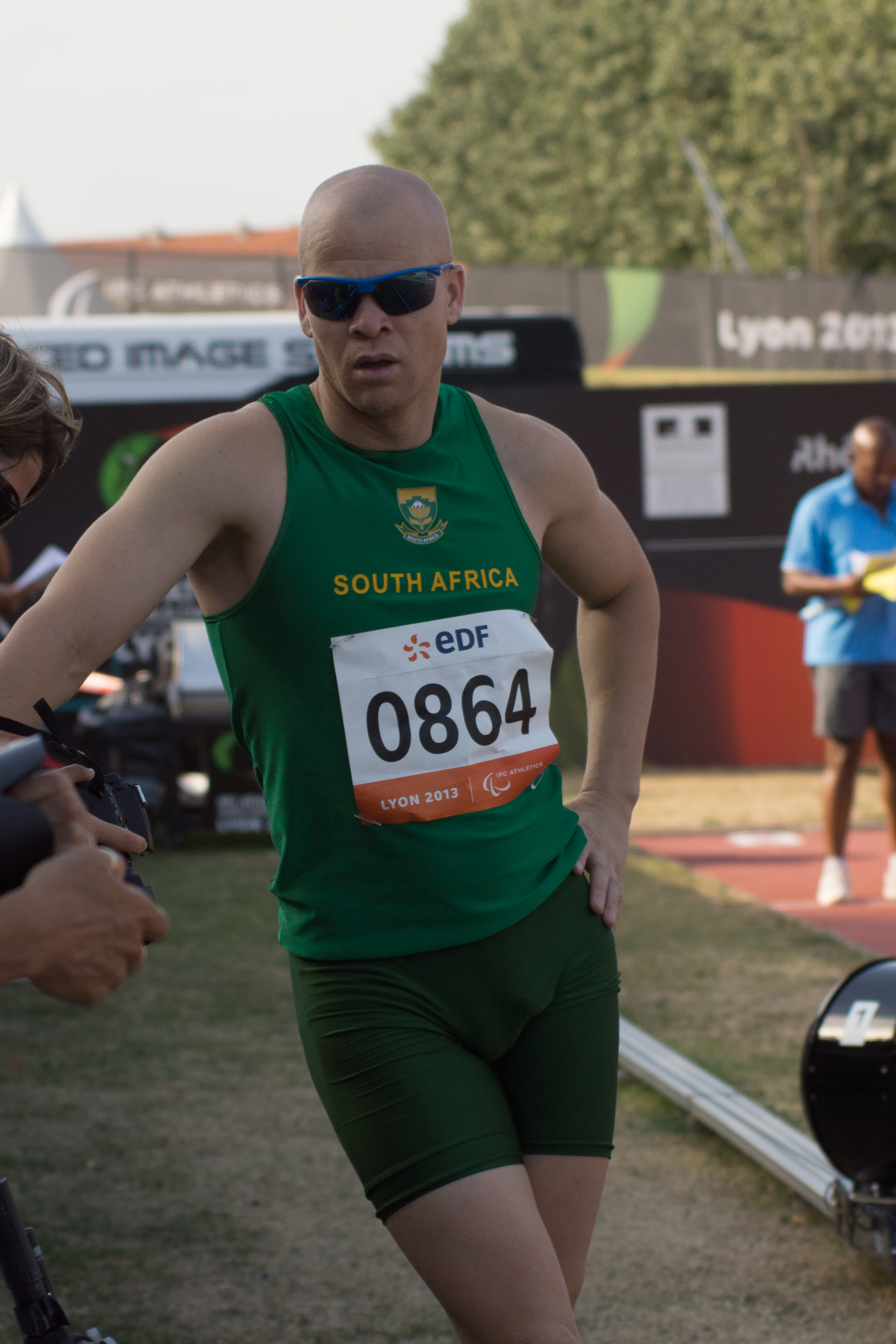
- Hilton Langenhoven at the 2013 IPC Athletics World Championships.

Personal information
- Nationality: South African
- Born: 21 June 1983 (age 43) Somerset West, South Africa
- Height: 177 cm (70 in)

Sport
- Sport: Track and field
- Disability class: T12
- Event(s): long jump sprint
Medal record
Track and field (F12)
Representing South Africa
Paralympic Games
Gold medal – first place	2008 Beijing	Pentathlon – P12
Gold medal – first place	2008 Beijing	200m – T12
Gold medal – first place	2008 Beijing	Long jump – F12
Gold medal – first place	2016 Rio de Janeiro	Long jump – T12
Silver medal – second place	2012 London	200m – T12
Silver medal – second place	2004 Athens	Long jump – F12
IPC World Championships
Gold medal – first place	2013 Lyon	Long jump – T12
Gold medal – first place	2011 Christchurch	Pentathlon – P11-13
Silver medal – second place	2011 Christchurch	Long jump – F13
Bronze medal – third place	2015 Doha	400m – T12
Commonwealth Games
Silver medal – second place	2006 Melbourne	100 metres T12
Silver medal – second place	2018 Gold Coast	100 metres T12
African Games
Silver medal – second place	2015 Brazzaville	200 m T12

Hilton Langenhoven (born 21 June 1983) is a South African athlete and three time Paralympic Champion, competing mainly in category F12 (visual impairment) long jump events. He was born in Somerset West, Western Cape.

He competed in the 2004 Summer Paralympics in Athens, Greece. There he won a silver medal in the men's Long jump – F12 event, finished eighth in the men's 100 metres – T12 event, finished eighth in the men's 200 metres – T12 event and finished fifth in the men's Javelin throw – F12 event. At the 2006 Melbourne Commonwealth Games, he won a silver medal in the 100 metres T12 event. He also competed at the 2008 Summer Paralympics in Beijing, China, a gold medal in the men's 200 metres – T12 event, a gold medal in the men's Long jump – F12 event and a gold medal in the men's Pentathlon – P12 event
