= 2011 IPC Athletics World Championships – Men's 800 metres =

2011 athletics competition

The men's 800 metres at the 2011 IPC Athletics World Championships is held at the QEII Stadium on 22-23 and 26–29 January

== Medalists ==
Class	Gold	Silver	Bronze
T11	Jason Joseph Dunkerley; Canada	Carlos j. Barto Silva; Brazil	William Sosa; Colombia
T12	Abderrahim Zhiou; Tunisia	Ignacio Avila; Spain	David Devine; Great Britain
T13	Lukasz Wietecki; Poland	Abdelillah Mame; Morocco	Jose Luis Sanchez; Venezuela
T36	Artem Arefyev; Russia	Paul Blake; Great Britain	Jose Manuel Gonzalez; Spain
T37	Michael McKillop; Ireland	Brad Scott; Australia	Khaled Hanani; Algeria
T46	Samir Nouioua; Algeria	Marcin Awizen; Poland	Guenther Matzinger; Germany
T52	Tomoya Ito; Japan	Hirokazu Ueyonabaru; Japan	Toshihiro Takada; Japan
T53	Richard Colman; Australia	Roger Puigbo Verdaguer; Spain	Yoo Byunghoon; South Korea
T54	David Weir; Great Britain	Marcel Hug; Switzerland	Julien Casoli; France

== T37 ==
The Men's 800 metres, T37 was held on January 28

T37 = spasticity in an arm and leg on one side of the body, good functional ability on the other side.

=== Final ===
Rank	Name	Nationality	Time	Notes
1st place, gold medalist(s)	Michael McKillop	Ireland	1:58.90	WR
2nd place, silver medalist(s)	Brad Scott	Australia	2:03.25	SB
3rd place, bronze medalist(s)	Khaled Hanani	Algeria	2:08.00	SB, R 125.5
4	Mariano Dominguez	Argentina	2:10.50	AR

Key: WR = World record, SB = Seasonal best, AR = Area Record, R 125.5 = Warning by unsporting manner

== See also ==
- List of IPC world records in athletics
