= QEII Stadium =

QEII Stadium may refer to:

- Queen Elizabeth II Park
- Queensland Sport and Athletics Centre
