= Athletics at the 2008 Summer Paralympics – Men's javelin throw F11–12 =

The Men's Javelin Throw F11-12 had its Final held on 10 September at 17:25.

== Medalists ==
Gold	Zhu Pengkai; China
Silver	Branimir Budetic; Croatia
Bronze	Miroslaw Pych; Poland

== Results ==
Place	Athlete	Class	1	2	3	4	5	6	Best	Points
1	Zhu Pengkai (CHN)	F12	58.16	x	63.07	60.53	-	59.87	63.07 WR	1114
2	Branimir Budetic (CRO)	F12	50.04	53.94	51.86	-	55.08	57.11	57.11	1009
3	Miroslaw Pych (POL)	F12	46.31	51.66	x	51.39	55.67	56.01	56.01	989
4	Bil Marinkovic (AUT)	F11	39.58	46.29	44.71	38.60	37.30	46.44	46.44	949
5	Aliaksandr Tryputs (BLR)	F12	45.43	51.50	52.40	50.14	50.41	47.53	52.40	926
6	Mineho Ozaki (JPN)	F11	40.57	42.33	x	43.72	44.24	44.46	44.46	908
7	Siegmund Hegeholz (GER)	F11	43.18	43.12	38.04	x	39.63	40.39	43.18	882
8	Milos Grlica (SRB)	F12	49.19	x	48.13	44.42	45.08	44.30	49.19	869
9	Thomas Ulbricht (GER)	F12	46.85	x	45.57				46.85	828
