= 2011 IPC Athletics World Championships – Women's marathon =

The women's marathon at the 2011 IPC Athletics World Championships was held in the streets of Christchurch, New Zealand on 30 January.

British athlete Shelly Woods, on January 29, pulled out of the marathon for safety reasons, as the roads around the circuit would not be closed to traffic.

Classification T54 event.

== Medalists ==
Class	Gold	Silver	Bronze
T54	Wakako Tsuchida; Japan	Sandra Graf; Switzerland	Amanda McGrory; United States

== T54 ==
The Women's marathon, T54 was held on January 30

T54 = normal upper limb function, partial to normal trunk function, may have significant function of the lower limbs.

=== Results ===
Rank	Athlete	Nationality	Time	Notes
1st place, gold medalist(s)	Wakako Tsuchida	Japan	1:48:24	
2nd place, silver medalist(s)	Sandra Graf	Switzerland	1:48:24	
3rd place, bronze medalist(s)	Amanda McGrory	United States	1:48:24	
4	Sandra Hager	Switzerland	2:10:39	
	Diane Roy	Canada	DNS	
	Rochelle Woods	Great Britain	DNS	

Key: DNS = did not start

== See also ==
- List of IPC world records in athletics
