= Catherine O'Neill (athlete) =

Irish Paralympic track and field athlete

Personal information
- Full name: Catherine O'Neill Cahill
- Nationality: Irish
- Born: Catherine O'Neill; 4 December 1975 (age 50) Ramesgrange New Ross, Ireland
- Height: 139 cm (55 in)
- Children: Calum Wayland 29/08/2005 and Sam Tomas Cahill 27/07/2016

Sport
- Country: Ireland
- Sport: Athletics
- Disability class: F51
- Event(s): Club throw, Discus throw
Medal record
Track and field
Representing Ireland
Paralympic Games
Silver medal – second place	2012 London	discus throw – F51/52/53
World Championships
Gold medal – first place	1998 Birmingham	Discus throw – F51
Gold medal – first place	2011 Christchurch	discus throw – F51–53
Silver medal – second place	2011 Christchurch	club throw – F31/32/51
European Championships
Silver medal – second place	2012 Stadskanaal	Club throw – F31/32/51

Catherine O'Neill born 4 December 1975) is a former Paralympian athlete from Ireland who competed mainly in category F51 track and field events.

== Athletics career ==
O'Neil took up disability sport whilst at a sports camp in New York City at the age of twelve. She first represented Ireland at a major international tournament at Birmingham during the 1998 IPC Athletics World Championships, winning gold in the F51 women's discus throw. O'Neil competed at three Summer Paralympic Games during her career, starting at the 2000 Summer Paralympics at Sydney. Initially specializing in the discus, show progressed in her later career to also entering club throw events. Although not competing in Athens, O'Neill was in the Ireland team for both the 2008 Games in Beijing and 2012 Games in London. Her only Paralympic podium finish came at London, where she won a silver in the discus throw – F51/52/53.

O'Neill's most successful tournament was the 2011 IPC Athletics World Championships in Christchurch, winning a gold in the discus throw and a silver in the club throw. After the 2014 IPC Athletics European Championships at Swansea, O'Neill decided to retire from sport.
