= Zena Cole =

American Paralympic discus thrower

Personal information
- Nickname: Ogie
- Nationality: United States
- Born: 18 March 1957 (age 69) Oregon, Ohio, United States
Medal record
Representing United States
Paralympic Games
Bronze medal – third place	2012 London	Discus throw F51/52/53
Parapan American Games
Gold medal – first place	2011 Guadalajara	Discus throw F51/52/53
World Championships
Silver medal – second place	2011 Christchurch	Discus throw F51/52/53
Bronze medal – third place	2013 Lyon	Discus throw F51/52/53

Zena Cole (born March 18, 1957) is an American Paralympic discus thrower, who has competed at the 2012 London and 2016 Rio de Janeiro Games, winning a bronze medal in London.

== Biography ==
Zena Cole was born in Oregon, Ohio. When she was 18-months-old she contracted polio and spent years in an iron lung ventilator. Until the age of twelve, she used crutches and braces which often broke while she was playing outside. The doctors suggested that she should use a wheelchair. In 1991 she was diagnosed with a condition called post-polio syndrome which caused her to retire from the Ohio Bureau of Vocational Rehabilitation.

In 2011, Cole won a silver medal at the 2011 IPC Athletics World Championships and the same year won a gold medal at the Parapan American Games. She also participated at the 2012 Summer Paralympics where she won a bronze medal for discus throw of 5.29 m. She participated in the 2013 IPC Athletics World Championships in Lyon, France, competing in discus and club throw.

At the 2016 Summer Paralympics, she beat her previous personal best of 4.89 m with a 4.98 m throw at the Women's Discus Throw in the F52 category but came sixth.
