= Julien Casoli =

French Paralympic athlete (born 1982)

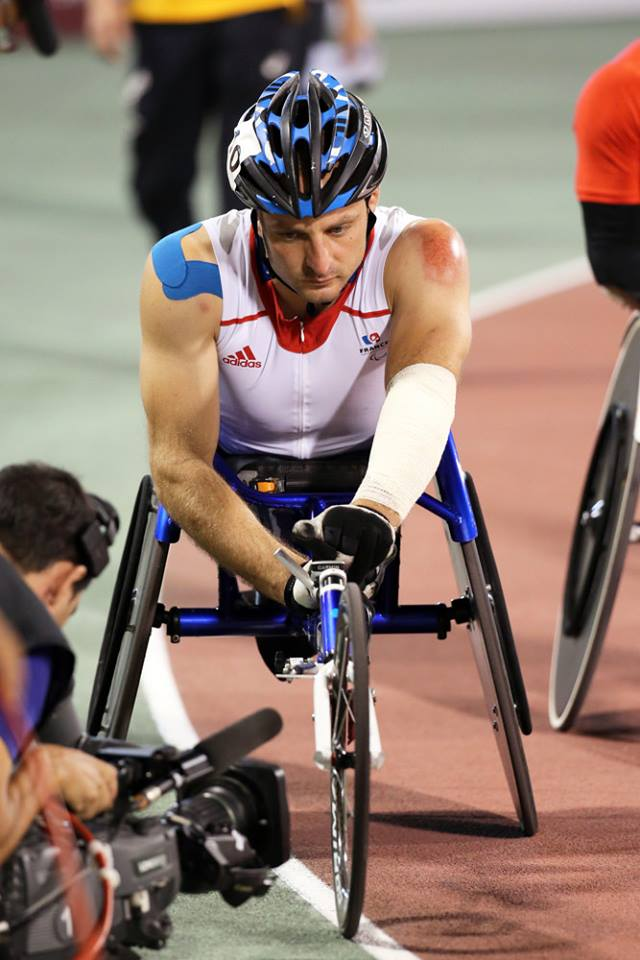
- Casoli at the 2015 IPC Athletics World Championships

Personal information
- Born: 5 July 1982 (age 44) Vesoul, France
- Height: 168 cm (5 ft 6 in)

Sport
- Disability: Spinal cord injuries
- Disability class: T54
- Club: Groupe Athletique Haut Saonois
- Coached by: David Salvati

Achievements and titles
- Paralympic finals: 2008; 2012; 2016
Medal record
Men's para athletics
Representing France
Paralympic Games
Bronze medal – third place	2008 Beijing	4x400m - T53/54
Bronze medal – third place	2012 London	5000 metres – T54
IPC World Championships
Bronze medal – third place	2011 Christchurch	800m - T54
Bronze medal – third place	2011 Christchurch	5000m - T54
Bronze medal – third place	2015 Doha	4x400 m relay T53-54
IPC European Championships
Bronze medal – third place	2014 Swansea	1,500m - T54
Mediterranean Games
Gold medal – first place	2013 Mersin	1,500m - T54
Silver medal – second place	2009 Pescara	1,500m - T54

Julien Casoli (born 5 July 1982) is a Paralympian athlete, from Vesoul, France competing mainly in category T54 sprint events.

Julien competed in the 2008 Summer Paralympics in Beijing where he competed in the 400m, 800m and 1500m and was a member of the bronze medal-winning French team in the 4 × 400 m. He also competed in the 1500 m. event at the 2013 Mediterranean Games in Mersin, Turkey where he won gold medal (3:26:66).
