= 2011 IPC Athletics World Championships – Men's pentathlon =

The men's pentathlon at the 2011 IPC Athletics World Championships was held at the QEII Stadium on 25 January

Classification P11−13: visual impairment

== Medalists ==
Class	Gold	Silver	Bronze
P11−13	Hilton Langenhoven; South Africa	Branimir Budetic; Croatia	Thomas Ulbricht; Germany

== Results ==
=== Long jump ===
Rank	Athlete	Nationality	Result	Points	Notes
1	Hilton Langenhoven	South Africa	7.01	816	
2	Branimir Budetic	Croatia	6.39	673	
3	Marc Lembeck	Germany	6.32	657	
4	Pengkai Zhu	China	6.29	650	
5	Thomas Ulbricht	Germany	6.28	648	
6	Ruslan Katyshev	Ukraine	6.17	624	

=== Javelin throw ===
Rank	Athlete	Nationality	Result	Points	Notes
1	Pengkai Zhu	China	61.90	766	
2	Branimir Budetic	Croatia	54.34	653	
3	Hilton Langenhoven	South Africa	48.21	562	
4	Thomas Ulbricht	Germany	47.66	554	
5	Ruslan Katyshev	Ukraine	47.35	549	
6	Marc Lembeck	Germany	38.94	427	

=== 100 metres ===
Rank	Athlete	Nationality	Result	Points	Notes
1	Hilton Langenhoven	South Africa	11.14	830	
2	Thomas Ulbricht	Germany	11.55	742	
3	Marc Lembeck	Germany	11.83	685	
4	Pengkai Zhu	China	11.99	653	
5	Ruslan Katyshev	Ukraine	12.00	651	
6	Branimir Budetic	Croatia	12.04	643	

=== Discus throw ===
Rank	Athlete	Nationality	Result	Points	Notes
1	Branimir Budetic	Croatia	34.99	563	
2	Marc Lembeck	Germany	34.99	563	
3	Ruslan Katyshev	Ukraine	31.41	492	
4	Pengkai Zhu	China	29.47	454	
5	Thomas Ulbricht	Germany	29.25	450	
6	Hilton Langenhoven	South Africa	27.23	410	

=== 1500 metres ===
Rank	Athlete	Nationality	Result	Points	Notes
1	Marc Lembeck	Germany	4:37.70	695	
2	Hilton Langenhoven	South Africa	4:38.42	690	
3	Branimir Budetic	Croatia	4:40.59	677	
4	Thomas Ulbricht	Germany	4:44.59	652	
5	Ruslan Katyshev	Ukraine	5:08.85	510	
6	Pengkai Zhu	China	6:06.58	238	

=== Final standings ===
Rank	Athlete	Nationality	Points	Notes
1	Hilton Langenhoven	South Africa	3308	
2	Branimir Budetic	Croatia	3209	
3	Thomas Ulbricht	Germany	3046	
4	Marc Lembeck	Germany	3027	
5	Ruslan Katyshev	Ukraine	2826	
6	Pengkai Zhu	China	2761	

== See also ==
- List of IPC world records in athletics
