= Zhu Pengkai =

Chinese Paralympic athlete

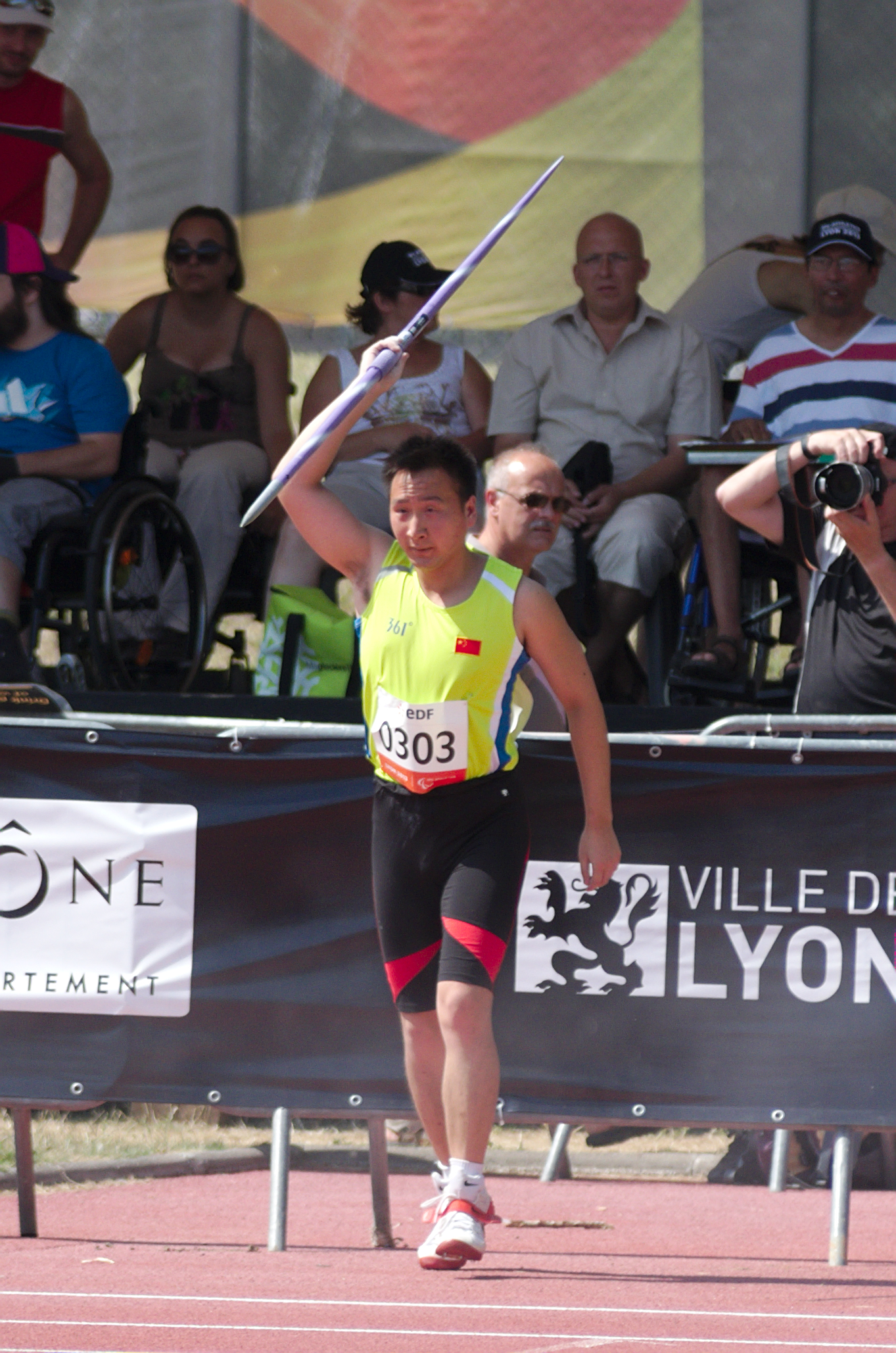
- Pengkai Zhu at the 2013 IPC Athletics World Championships

Personal information
- Nationality: China
- Born: March 21, 1987 (age 39) Beijing, China
Medal record
Paralympic athletics
Representing China
Paralympic Games
| Gold medal – first place | 2008 Beijing | Javelin throw F11/12 |
| Gold medal – first place | 2012 London | Javelin throw F12/13 |
World Championships
| Gold medal – first place | 2011 Christchurch | Javelin throw F12 |
| Bronze medal – third place | 2006 Assen | Javelin throw F12 |
| Bronze medal – third place | 2019 Dubai | Javelin throw F12/13 |
Asian Para Games
| Bronze medal – third place | 2014 Incheon | Javelin throw F12/13 |

Zhu Pengkai (Chinese: 朱鹏凯; pinyin: Zhū Péngkǎi; born March 21, 1987) is a Paralympian athlete from China competing mainly in category F12 javelin events.

Zhu had to pull out of the pentathlon at the 2008 Summer Paralympics in his home country, but he went on to win the F11/12 javelin gold medal in front of the home fans.
