= Denis Gulin =

Russian Paralympic athlete

Sport
- Country: Russia
- Sport: Para-athletics
- Disability: Vision impairment
- Events: Long jump; Triple jump
Medal record
Paralympic Games
Gold medal – first place	2012 London	Triple jump F11
World Championships
Gold medal – first place	2012 Stadskanaal	Triple jump T11
Bronze medal – third place	2012 Stadskanaal	Long jump F11

Denis Gulin is a Russian Paralympic athlete. He represented Russia at the 2012 Summer Paralympics in London, United Kingdom and he won the gold medal in the men's triple jump F11 event.

He also competed at the 2012 IPC Athletics European Championships held in Stadskanaal, Netherlands winning the gold medal in the men's triple jump T11 event and the men's long jump F11 event.
