= Tanja Dragić =

Serbian Paralympic athlete

Medal record

Representing Serbia

Women's Athletics

Paralympic Games
Gold medal – first place	2012 London	Javelin -F12/13

IPC Athletics World Championships
Gold medal – first place	2011 Christchurch	Javelin - F13

Tanja Dragić (Serbian Cyrillic: Тања Драгић; born May 15, 1991) is a Paralympian athlete from Serbia competing mainly in category F12/13 javelin events.

At the 2012 Summer Paralympics held in London, she won a gold medal in javelin and posted new world record 42.51m.
