= Antonio Andújar =

Spanish Paralympic athlete (born 1978)

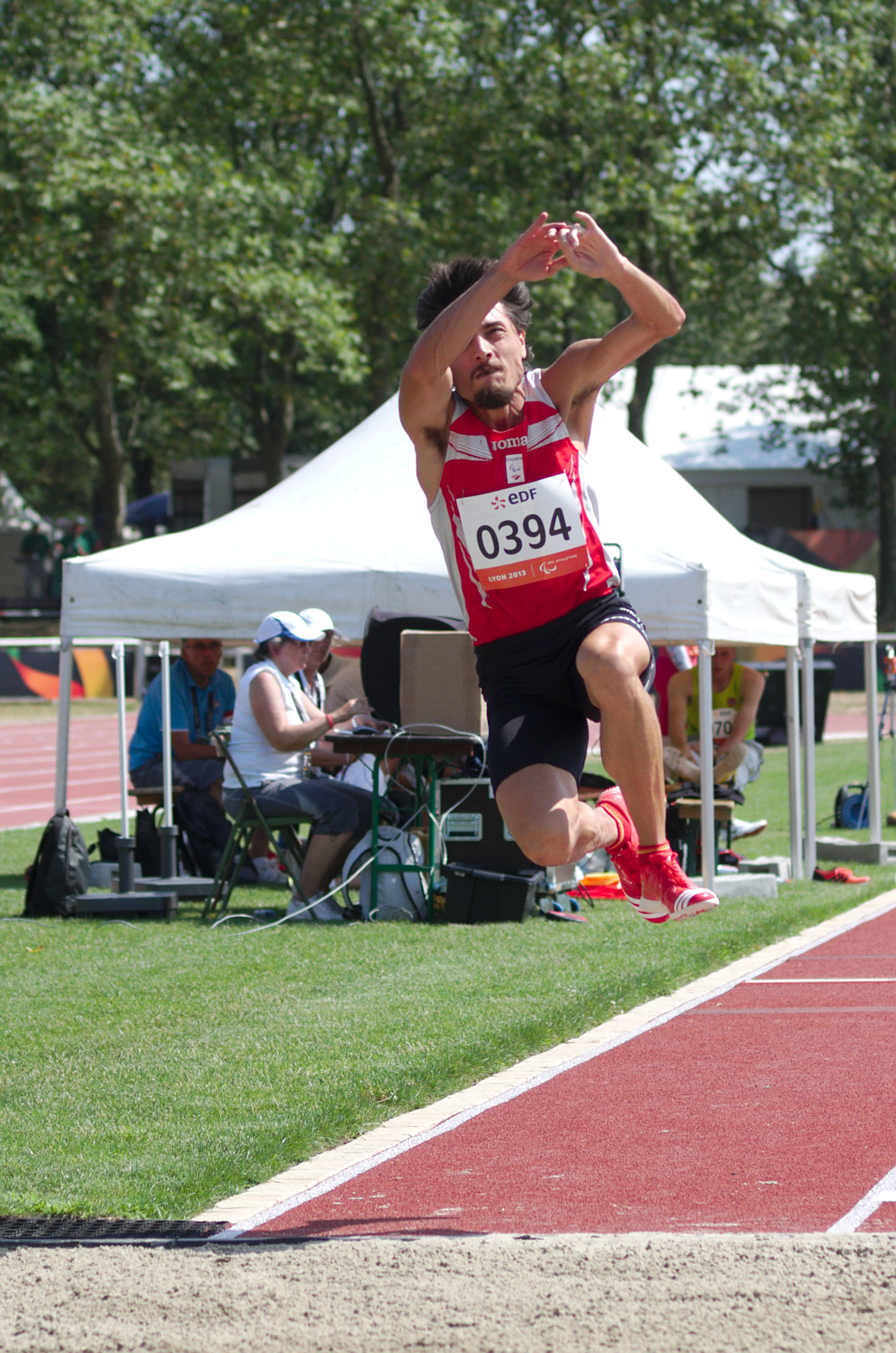
- Andújar completing in the triple jump in 2013

Personal information
- Full name: Antonio Andújar Arroyo
- Nationality: Spanish
- Born: 5 May 1978 (age 48) Ciudad Real, Spain

Sport
- Country: Spain
- Sport: Track and field (F46)

Antonio Andújar Arroyo (Note: In this Spanish name, the first or paternal surname is Andújar and the second or maternal family name is Arroyo.) (born 5 May 1978) is a Paralympic athlete from Spain competing mainly in category F46 track and field events.

== Personal ==
Andújar was born on 5 May 1978, in Ciudad Real, Spain. He has physical disability, a disability that effects one arm and one leg. His disability is such that when he walks, most of the time you cannot tell he has one.

When he was 20 years old, Andújar was involved in a motorcycle accident that required him to rehabilitate using a wheelchair for about a year. Following the accident, he had less use of one side of his body. Recovery from the motorcycle accident required 15 surgeries on his arm and 11 on his leg. In 2012, he lived in El Campello, Alicante and was a professional athlete. When not engaged in that, he works for his family business as nutritionist, which affords him flexibility in his training schedule.

== Athletics ==
Andújar is an F46 competitor. He started in athletics when he was 16 years old.

Andújar competed at the 2011 IPC World Athletics Championships in Christchurch, New Zealand where he finished fifth in the F46 jump event. In 2012, he was a recipient of a Plan ADO €6,000 scholarship for athletes and a €2,500 scholarship as a coach. The lack of financial support in his hometown resulted in him training elsewhere in 2012. Given that situation, he spoke before the city council to complain about the lack of local resources. That year, he was also a nominee for the ADDA Provincial Sport Gala's best athlete with a disability award alongside Luis Francísco Paredes Marco and Ignacio Gil Delgado. He competed in the 2012 Summer Paralympics in London, England where he finished 8th in the F46 triple jump event. His jump on the finals was his season's best distance. He was one of two Spanish participants from Ciudad Real to compete in London. There was a ceremony at the city hall of his home town for him following his return from the London Games. It was attended by the town's mayor.

In July 2013, Andújar participated in the 2013 IPC Athletics World Championships.
