= Kota Hokinoue =

Japanese wheelchair racer

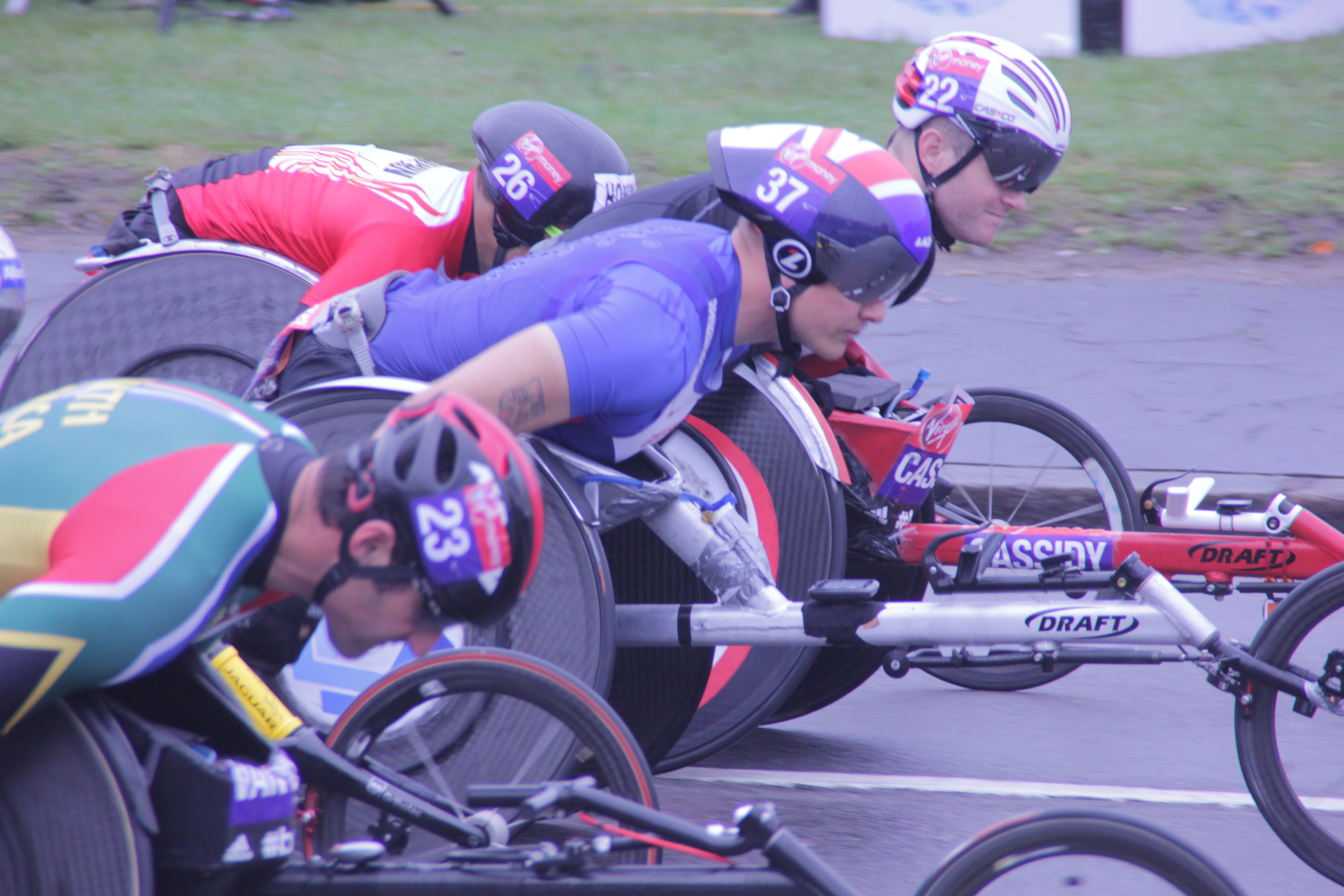
- Kota Hokinoue (26) at the start of the 2015 London Marathon

Personal information
- Born: 30 March 1974 (age 52) Fukuoka, Japan

Sport
- Country: Japan
- Sport: Paralympic athletics
- Disability: Spinal cord injury
- Disability class: T54
Medal record
Paralympic athletics
Representing Japan
World Para Athletics Championships
Silver medal – second place	2011 Christchurch	10,000m T54
Bronze medal – third place	2013 Lyon	Marathon T54
Asian Para Games
Gold medal – first place	2010 Guangzhou	Marathon T54
Bronze medal – third place	2010 Guangzhou	5000m T54

Kota Hokinoue (洞ノ上浩太, Hokinoue Kōta; born 30 March 1974) is a Japanese wheelchair athlete.

== Career ==
Hokinoue's career began in 2002, two years after he sustained a spinal cord injury in a motorcycle accident.

His first marathon was at the 2008 Summer Paralympics, where he placed 5th with a time of 1:23:22. His marathon best is 1:22:01, which he attained at the 2011 Oensingen Wheelchair Marathon; this time became the Japanese record. Hokinoue also holds Japanese records for 5000 m and 10,000 m races.
