= 2006 IPC Athletics World Championships =

Paralympic track and field event

4th IPC Athletics World Championships
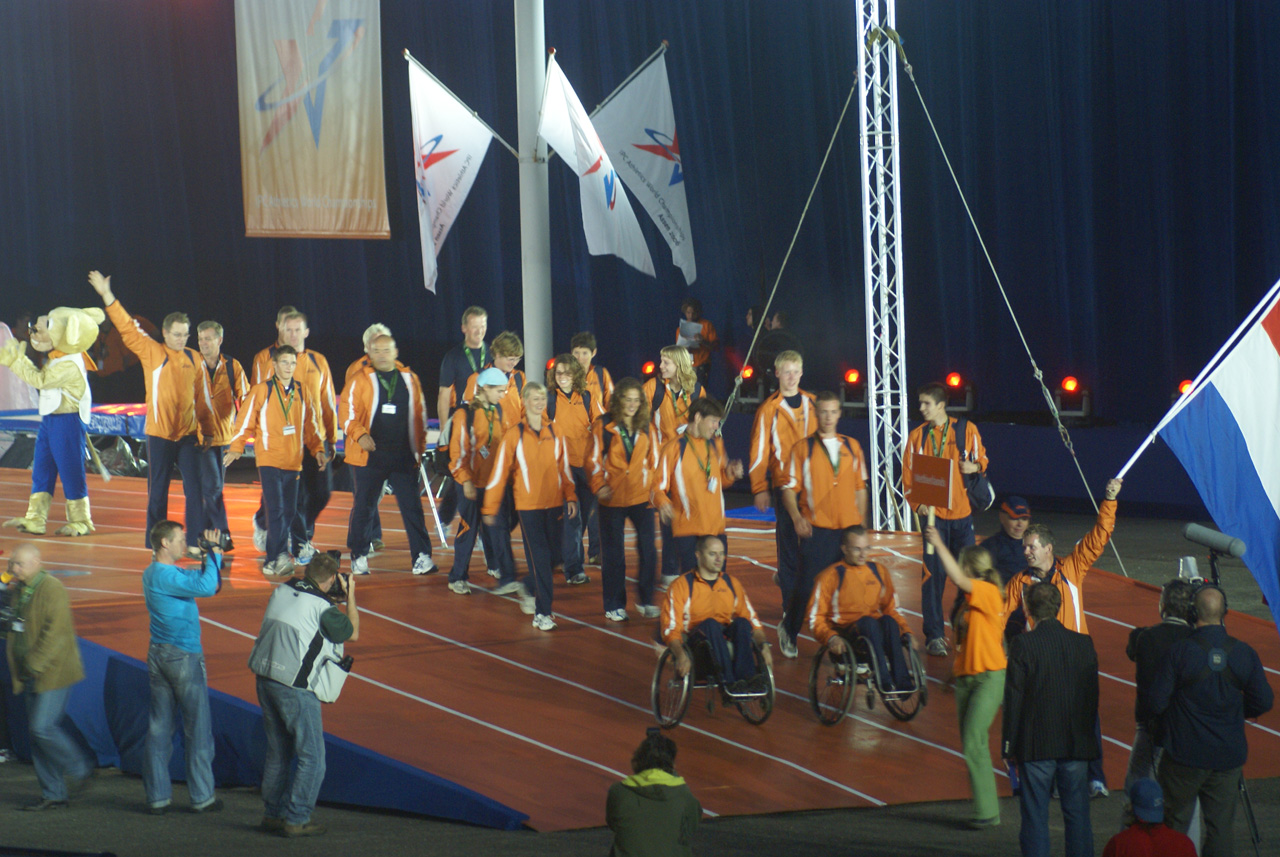
- Host city: Assen
- Country: Netherlands
- Nations: 76
- Athletes: 1097
- Dates: 2–9 September
- Main venue: Sports Park Stadsbroek

The 2006 IPC Athletics World Championships was held in Assen, Netherlands from 2–9 September 2006. It was the fourth edition of the international athletics competition for athletes with a disability organised by the International Paralympic Committee (IPC).

The main venue for the competition was Sports Park Stadsbroek, with the marathon events taking place in the surrounding area. The opening and closing ceremonies took place at De Smelt Stadium. Princess Margriet of the Netherlands was present for the opening of the championships. A total of 76 nations and 1097 athletes took part in the events.

Over the course of the nine-day competition 51 IPC world records were broken. Among these were sprint records by visually impaired runner Jason Smyth and amputee sportsman Oscar Pistorius. China was the top performing nation, with 22 gold medals among its haul of 55 medals. The United States and Australia were the next best nations, with each securing 16 golds and 32 medals in total. Among the participating nations, 58 reached the medal table.

The IPC launched its own internet streaming service at paralympicsport.tv (later moved to a YouTube channel), which broadcast live events from the competition.

== Medals ==
- de:Leichtathletik-Weltmeisterschaften der Behinderten 2006/Medaillenspiegel - 2006 Medals

Rank	Nation	Gold	Silver	Bronze	Total
1	China (CHN)	22	12	21	55
2	United States (USA)	16	12	4	32
3	Australia (AUS)	16	6	10	32
4	Ukraine (UKR)	9	10	12	31
5	Great Britain (GBR)	9	9	9	27
6	Spain (ESP)	9	3	5	17
7	Germany (GER)	8	11	13	32
8	France (FRA)	7	5	3	15
9	Czech Republic (CZE)	6	7	4	17
10	Canada (CAN)	6	5	6	17
11	Poland (POL)	6	5	4	15
12	Netherlands (NED)	6	3	1	10
13	Iran (IRN)	6	1	4	11
14	Switzerland (SUI)	5	10	4	19
15	South Africa (SAF)	5	7	5	17
16	Algeria (ALG)	5	6	3	14
17	Morocco (MAR)	5	4	3	12
18	Greece (GRE)	5	2	3	10
19	Brazil (BRA)	4	11	10	25
20	Mexico (MEX)	4	6	5	15
21	Kenya (KEN)	4	3	3	10
22	Russia (RUS)	3	9	8	20
23	New Zealand (NZL)	3	4	1	8
24	Lithuania (LTU)	3	3	2	8
25	Ireland (IRL)	3	2	2	7
26	Cuba (CUB)	3	1	1	5
27	Austria (AUT)	2	8	4	14
28	Belarus (BLR)	2	4	2	8
29	Egypt (EGY)	2	2	4	8
30	Bulgaria (BUL)	2	2	0	4
31	Japan (JPN)	2	1	8	11
32	Croatia (CRO)	2	0	1	3
33	Hong Kong (HKG)	2	0	0	2
34	Tunisia (TUN)	1	10	6	17
35	Thailand (THA)	1	3	1	5
36	Latvia (LAT)	1	2	2	5
37	Finland (FIN)	1	1	3	5
38	Portugal (POR)	1	1	2	4
39	Jamaica (JAM)	1	1	1	3
39	Slovakia (SVK)	1	1	1	3
41	Denmark (DEN)	1	1	0	2
42	Saudi Arabia (KSA)	1	0	1	2
43	Belgium (BEL)	1	0	0	1
43	Chinese Taipei (TPE)	1	0	0	1
45	Azerbaijan (AZE)	0	2	2	4
46	Italy (ITA)	0	1	5	6
47	United Arab Emirates (UAE)	0	1	3	4
48	Angola (ANG)	0	1	1	2
48	Argentina (ARG)	0	1	1	2
48	Serbia and Montenegro (SCG)	0	1	1	2
48	Venezuela (VEN)	0	1	1	2
52	Singapore (SIN)	0	1	0	1
53	Cyprus (CYP)	0	0	1	1
53	Iceland (ISL)	0	0	1	1
53	Jordan (JOR)	0	0	1	1
53	Norway (NOR)	0	0	1	1
53	Qatar (QAT)	0	0	1	1
53	South Korea (KOR)	0	0	1	1
Totals (58 entries)		203	203	202	608
