= 2011 IPC Athletics World Championships =

Paralympic track and field event

5th IPC Athletics World Championships
- Host city: Christchurch, New Zealand
- Nations: 80
- Athletes: 1060
- Dates: 21 – 30 January
- Main venue: QEII Stadium

The 2011 IPC Athletics World Championships was held in Christchurch, New Zealand from January 21 to 30, 2011. Athletes with disabilities competed, and the Championships were a qualifying event for the London 2012 Paralympic Games.

Over 1,000 athletes competed, including Oscar Pistorius (nicknamed the "Blade Runner), who competed in class T44 at the 100m, 4 × 100 m relay, 200m, and 400m events.

A warm-up meet, with free entry for the audience, was held on Friday January 14.

Estimates placed the total visitor spending in the city at around $12 million.

== Venue ==
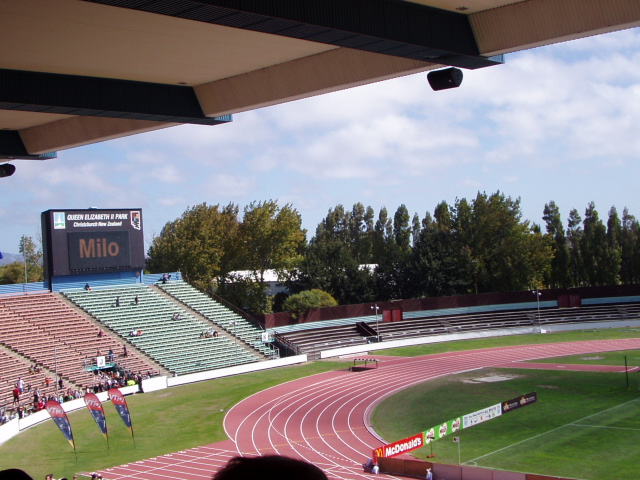
Queen Elizabeth II Park Location: Christchurch Capacity: 20,000

The championship was staged in the 20,000-seat Queen Elizabeth II Park stadium that was built in 1973 for the 1974 British Commonwealth Games. Three weeks after the championship closed, the venue was damaged beyond repair in the 22 February 2011 Christchurch earthquake and has since been demolished.

== Coverage ==
At least 120 journalists from 13 countries reported on the Championships. The countries included Brazil, Egypt, Finland, Switzerland, Algeria, Australia, Colombia and the United Kingdom.

The internet-TV channel ParalympicSport.TV, owned by the International Paralympic Committee (IPC), in conjunction with Sky Television and Kordia, broadcast daily live coverage of the Championships. ParalympicSport.TV also added clips to their YouTube channel.

== Events ==
=== Opening ceremony ===
The opening ceremony was held at Cathedral Square on Friday January 21 as a free event. Over 1000 athletes paraded through the streets of Christchurch. At Cathedral Square, the athletes were greeted by a Pōwhiri, a Māori welcoming ceremony. The New Zealand flag was raised and the national anthem performed. The Championships were Officially opened by the Prime Minister of New Zealand, Rt Hon. John Key.

=== Classification ===
- F = field athletes
- T = track athletes
- P = pentathlon
- 11–13 – visually impaired, 11 and 12 compete with a sighted guide
- 20 – intellectual disability
- 31–38 – cerebral palsy
- 41–46 – amputation, les autre
- 51–58 – wheelchair athletes

Where there are more than one classification in one event, (for example discus throw F54/55/56), a percentage system is used to determine who's the winner.

=== Schedule ===
The 1st and 2nd placed athletes in any individual medal event on the London 2012 Paralympic Games Programme, qualify the NPC for one (1) qualification slot (per placing) for the London 2012 Paralympic Games.

| ● | Opening ceremony | Events | ● | Closing ceremony |

| Date → | | 21 | 22 | 23 | 24 | 25 | 26 | 27 | 28 | 29 | 30 |
|---|---|---|---|---|---|---|---|---|---|---|---|
| 100 m | Men; Details | | T11, T53, T54 | T11, T36, T37, T38, T53, T54 | T11, T13, T34, T35, T36, T37, T38, T51, T52 | P11-13, T34, T42, T44, T46 | T12, T42, T44, T46 | | | | |
| 100 m | Women; Details | | T13, T52, T53, T54 | T53, T54 | T11, T34, T46 | T11, T12, T35, T36, T37, T38, T42, T44, T46 | T36, T37, T38, T44 | | | | |
| 200 m | Men; Details | | T34, T35, T51 | T34, T42, T44, T46, T52 | T42, T44, T46, T54 | T37, T38, T53, T54 | T13, T36, T37, T38, T53, T54 | T12, T13, T36 | T11 | T11, T12 | |
| 200 m | Women; Details | | T11, T12, T34, T36, T37, T38, T46 | T11, T12, T36, T37, T38, T46 | T52, T53 | T44, T53, T54 | T13 | | T35 | | |
| 400 m | Men; Details | | T12 | T12 | | | T11, T52 | T11, T34, T46, T52, T53, T54 | T36, T38, T46, T53, T54 | T13, T36, T37, T38, T44 | |
| 400 m | Women; Details | | | | | T11 | T11, T12, T52 | T12, T46 | T37, T53, T54 | T13, T37, T53, T54 | |
| 800 m | Men; Details | | T54 | T53, T54 | | | T46 | T13, T36 | T11, T12, T13, T36, T37, T52 | T11, T12 | |
| 800 m | Women; Details | | | | T53, T54 | | | T11 | T52 | T11 | |
| 1500 m | Men; Details | | T52 | T13, T36 | T11, T12, T46 | P11-13, T11, T54 | T12, T37, T54 | T20 | | F20 | |
| 1500 m | Women; Details | | | T12 | | T12, T13 | T54 | | T20, T54 | | |
| 5000 m | Men; Details | | T46 | | T54 | T52 | T11, T52 | T11, T12, T54 | | | |
| 5000 m | Women; Details | | T54 | | | | | | | | |
| 10,000 m | Men; Details | | T54 | T11, T12, T54 | | | | | | | |
| Marathon | Men; Details | | | | | | | | | | T11, T12, T46, T54 |
| Marathon | Women; Details | | | | | | | | | | T54 |
| 4 × 100 m relay | Men; Details | | | | T11-13 | | | T11-13, T35-38 | | T42-46 | |
| 4 × 100 m relay | Women; Details | | | | T35-38 | | | | T11-13 | | |
| 4 × 400 m relay | Men; Details | | | | T53/54 | | | | | T53/54 | |
| 4 × 400 m relay | Women; Details | | | | | | | T53/54 | | | |
| Long jump | Men; Details | | F13, F37/38, F42, F46 | F46 | | P11-13, F36, F44 | F20 | | | F11 | |
| Long jump | Women; Details | | | F11, F42 | F20, F44/46 | | | F13, F38 | | | |
| Triple jump | Men; Details | | | | | | F11 | | F12, F46 | | |
| High jump | Men; Details | | | | | | | F46 | F13 | F42 | |
| Pentathlon | Men; Details | | | | | P11-13 | | | | | |
| Shot put | Men; Details | | F12, F32/33, F34 | F12, F35/36 | F11, F52/53, F57/58 | F40, F42 | F54/55/56 | F37/38 | F44/46 | F20 | |
| Shot put | Women; Details | | F42/44/46 | F32/33/34, F40, F52/53, F57/58 | F32/33/34, F37 | F37 | F11, F12 | F35/36 | F20, F35/36 | F54/55/56 | |
| Discus throw | Men; Details | | F11 | F37/38 | F32/33/34, F37/38, F40 | P11-13, F32/33/34, F46 | F44, F57/58 | F42, F51/52/53 | F12, F35/36, F54/55/56 | | |
| Discus throw | Women; Details | | F12 | F37 | | F54/55/56 | | | | F35/36, F40, F51/52/53, F57/58 | |
| Javelin throw | Men; Details | | F35/36, F46 | F42, F44, F46 | F54/55/56 | P11-13 | F37/38 | F11, F33/34 | F40, F57/58 | F13, F52/53 | |
| Javelin throw | Women; Details | | | | F13 | F13, F57/58 | F38 | F54/55/56 | F33/34/52/53, F46 | | |
| Club throw | Men; Details | | | | | F31/32/51 | | | | | |
| Club throw | Women; Details | | F31/32/51 | | | | | | | | |
| Ceremonies | | ● | | | | | | | | | ● |

== Medalists ==
The sighted guides who run together with athletes with a visual impairment at the Championship, did not receive a medal. This will change for the 2012 Summer Paralympics in London. For the first time, also guides at a major international athletics event will receive medals. In Paralympic winter sports, such as alpine skiing, biathlon and cross-country skiing the guides receive medals, for example at the 2010 Winter Paralympics. In Paralympic tandem cycling events, the pilots receive medals, for example at the 2008 Summer Paralympics.

== Medal table ==
* Host nation (New Zealand)

| Rank | Nation | Gold | Silver | Bronze | Total |
|---|---|---|---|---|---|
| 1 | China (CHN) | 21 | 22 | 15 | 58 |
| 2 | Russia (RUS) | 18 | 11 | 6 | 35 |
| 3 | Great Britain (GBR) | 12 | 10 | 16 | 38 |
| 4 | Brazil (BRA) | 12 | 10 | 8 | 30 |
| 5 | Poland (POL) | 12 | 7 | 6 | 25 |
| 6 | United States (USA) | 9 | 10 | 15 | 34 |
| 7 | Ukraine (UKR) | 8 | 10 | 9 | 27 |
| 8 | Germany (GER) | 8 | 8 | 8 | 24 |
| 9 | Australia (AUS) | 8 | 8 | 7 | 23 |
| 10 | South Africa (SAF) | 8 | 7 | 9 | 24 |
| 11 | Algeria (ALG) | 8 | 6 | 7 | 21 |
| 12 | Tunisia (TUN) | 8 | 6 | 5 | 19 |
| 13 | France (FRA) | 8 | 4 | 4 | 16 |
| 14 | Mexico (MEX) | 6 | 2 | 4 | 12 |
| 15 | Cuba (CUB) | 6 | 0 | 0 | 6 |
| 16 | Spain (ESP) | 4 | 4 | 9 | 17 |
| 17 | Canada (CAN) | 4 | 4 | 4 | 12 |
| 18 | Japan (JPN) | 3 | 5 | 14 | 22 |
| 19 | Azerbaijan (AZE) | 3 | 1 | 2 | 6 |
| 20 | Switzerland (SUI) | 2 | 8 | 2 | 12 |
| 21 | Morocco (MAR) | 2 | 3 | 4 | 9 |
| 22 | Iran (IRN) | 2 | 2 | 4 | 8 |
| 23 | Croatia (CRO) | 2 | 2 | 1 | 5 |
| 23 | Egypt (EGY) | 2 | 2 | 1 | 5 |
| 25 | Ireland (IRL) | 2 | 1 | 0 | 3 |
| 25 | United Arab Emirates (UAE) | 2 | 1 | 0 | 3 |
| 27 | Belarus (BLR) | 2 | 0 | 2 | 4 |
| 28 | Cyprus (CYP) | 2 | 0 | 0 | 2 |
| 28 | Latvia (LAT) | 2 | 0 | 0 | 2 |
| 30 | Greece (GRE) | 1 | 5 | 4 | 10 |
| 31 | Kenya (KEN) | 1 | 4 | 3 | 8 |
| 32 | Iraq (IRQ) | 1 | 4 | 0 | 5 |
| 33 | Portugal (POR) | 1 | 3 | 1 | 5 |
| 33 | Serbia (SRB) | 1 | 3 | 1 | 5 |
| 35 | Czech Republic (CZE) | 1 | 2 | 3 | 6 |
| 36 | Bulgaria (BUL) | 1 | 2 | 1 | 4 |
| 36 | Finland (FIN) | 1 | 2 | 1 | 4 |
| 38 | Austria (AUT) | 1 | 1 | 3 | 5 |
| 38 | Thailand (THA) | 1 | 1 | 3 | 5 |
| 40 | Chile (CHI) | 1 | 1 | 0 | 2 |
| 40 | Hong Kong (HKG) | 1 | 1 | 0 | 2 |
| 42 | Lithuania (LTU) | 1 | 0 | 1 | 2 |
| 42 | Sweden (SWE) | 1 | 0 | 1 | 2 |
| 44 | Belgium (BEL) | 1 | 0 | 0 | 1 |
| 44 | Denmark (DEN) | 1 | 0 | 0 | 1 |
| 46 | Venezuela (VEN) | 0 | 3 | 2 | 5 |
| 47 | Slovenia (SLO) | 0 | 3 | 1 | 4 |
| 48 | Colombia (COL) | 0 | 2 | 3 | 5 |
| 49 | Ethiopia (ETH) | 0 | 2 | 1 | 3 |
| 50 | Slovakia (SVK) | 0 | 2 | 0 | 2 |
| 51 | Netherlands (NED) | 0 | 1 | 4 | 5 |
| 52 | Korea (COR) | 0 | 1 | 2 | 3 |
| 53 | Jordan (JOR) | 0 | 1 | 1 | 2 |
| 53 | Namibia (NAM) | 0 | 1 | 1 | 2 |
| 55 | Fiji (FIJ) | 0 | 1 | 0 | 1 |
| 55 | India (IND) | 0 | 1 | 0 | 1 |
| 55 | Italy (ITA) | 0 | 1 | 0 | 1 |
| 55 | Norway (NOR) | 0 | 1 | 0 | 1 |
| 59 | New Zealand (NZL)* | 0 | 0 | 0 | 0 |
| Totals (59 entries) | | 202 | 203 | 199 | 604 |

== Changes in medal standings ==
List of changes in medal standings
| Ruling date | Sport | Event | NPC | Gold | Silver | Bronze | Total |
|---|---|---|---|---|---|---|---|
| 7 April 2011 | Men's discus throw | F42 | South Africa | −1 | | | −1 |
| 7 April 2011 | Men's discus throw | F42 | Belgium | +1 | −1 | | |
| 7 April 2011 | Men's discus throw | F42 | Great Britain | | +1 | −1 | |
| 7 April 2011 | Men's discus throw | F42 | Greece | | | +1 | +1 |

== Highlights ==
=== Records ===
At the competition, 57 world records, 173 Championship records, and a number of area records and national records were broken.

=== Day 0 (21st) ===
Opening ceremony.

=== Day 1 (22nd) ===
There were seven world records: Brazil's Terezinha Guilhermina in the women's 200m T11 with a time of 24.74, China's Yuxi Ma (F37) in the men's long jump F37/38 with a length of 6.07m, France's Arnaud Assoumani in the men's long jump F46 twice, first with a length of 7.36m, then with 7.58m, Algeria's Karim Bettina (F32) in the men's shot put F32/33 final with a length of 10.89m and in the same event Algeria's Kamel Kardjena (F33) with 12.24m, France's Thierry Cibone in the men's shot put F34 with a length of 11.53m, China's Liangmin Zhang (classification F11) with a world record throw in the women's discus throw F12 (included both F11 and F12) with 40.42, which gave her a silver medal, while Croatia's Marija Iveković (F12) took the gold medal.

- Day One on YouTube

=== Day 2 (23rd) ===
Eight World records: Mexico's Angeles Ortiz Hernandes (F58) in the women's shot put F57/58 final with the length of 11.21m, Poland's Pawel Piotrowski (F36) in the men's shot put F35/36 with a throw of 13.77m, Australia's Kelly Cartwright set a world record and took Australia's first gold medal in the women's long jump F42 with a length of 4.19m, China's Mingjie Gao in the men's javelin T44 final with 59.82m, Poland's Tomasz Blatkiewicz (F37) in the men's discus F37/38 with a length of 53.00m after Ukraine's Mykola Zhabnyak (F37) had broken it first with 52.48m, Egypt's Mostafa Fathalla Mohammed in the men's 100m T37 heat with a time of 11.64 sec, and two records in the women's shot put F32/33/34: Germany's Brigit Kober (classification F34) with a length of 9.30m, and Greece's Maria Stamatoula (F32) with 6.60m.

- Day Two on YouTube

=== Day 3 (24th) ===
Brazil's Yohansson Nascimento (T45) set a world record for classification T45 in the men's 200m race T46 (included T45 and T46 classified athletes) with a time of 22.35 and won the silver medal while Antonis Aresti (T46) of Cyprus did not set a record for T46, but won the gold medal with a time of 22.25.

Other world records: Egypt's Mostafa Fathalla Mohamed in the men's 100m T37 final with a time of 11.61, Ukraine's team (Viktoriya Kravchenko, Maryna Snisar, Oksana Krechunyak, Inna Dyachenko) in the women's 4 × 100 m relay F35-38 with a time of 55.07, Brazil's Terezinha Guilhermina in the women's 100m T11 heats with a time of 12.13, Russia's Alexy Kuznetsov (F54) in the men's javelin throw F54/55/56 with a length of 29.44m, Serbia's Tanja Dragic (F12) in the women's javelin throw F13 with a length of 36.74m, Latvia's Aigars Apinis (F52) in the men's shot put F52/53 with a length of 10.03m, Russia's Alexey Ashapatov (F58) in the men's shot put F57/58 with the length of 16.37m, Paschalis Stathelakos of Greece, in the men's discus throw F40 with the length 40.92, and Algeria's Lahouari Bahlaz (F32) in the men's discus throw F32/33/34 with a length of 20.30m.

- Day Three on YouTube

=== Day 4 (25th) ===
Brazil's Odair Santos set a world record in the men's 1500m T11 with 4:04.70, Terezinha Guilhermina of Brazil set a world record in the women's 100m T11 with a time of 12.13sec. Other world records: Markus Rehm of Germany in the men's long jump F44 with a jump of 7.09m, Algeria's Lahouari Bahlaz in the men's club throw F31/32/51 with a length of 36.73m, and Algeria's Hocine Gherzouli in the men's shot put F40 with the length 12.21m.

- Day Four on YouTube

=== Day 5 (26th) ===
In the 100m T44 men final, America's Jerome Singleton and South Africa's Oscar Pistorius battled it out with Singleton securing gold, just 0.002 ahead of Pistorius. Both Singleton and Pistorius were timed in 11.34.

In the 1500m T37 men, Ireland's Michael McKillop won and set a world record with a time of 4:14.81, but did not receive a medal, because only two athletes competed, and there must be a minimum of three competitors.

There were five more world records: Great Britain's Daniel Greaves in the men's discus throw F44 final with a throw of 58.98m, Algeria's Sofiane Hamdi in the men's 200m T37 final with a time of 23.64secs, Brazil's Yohansson Nascimento in the men's 100m T46 final with a time of 11.01secs, Russia's Alexey Ashapatov in the men's discus throw F57/58 final with a throw of 57.64m, and Cuba's Omara Durand in the women's 200m T13 final with a time of 24.24secs.

- Day Five on YouTube

=== Day 6 (27th) ===
There were seven world records: Thierry Cibone of France, in the men's F33/34 javelin throw with a throw of 35.91m, Egypt's Ia Abdelwareth in the men's F37/38 shot put with a throw of 15.58m, Latvia's Aigars Apinis in the men's F51/52/53 discus throw with a throw of 20.88m, China's team (Ting Zhang, Lisha Huang, Wenjun Liu, Hongzhuan Zhou) in the women's 4X400m relay T53/54 with a time of 3:36.11, Tunisia's Hania Aidi in the women's javelin throw F54/55/56, with a throw of 17.27m, both Ukraine's Mariia Pomazan (F35), with a throw of 10.61m, and China's Qing Wu (F36), with a throw of 9.66m, in the women's F35/36 shot put.

- Day Six on YouTube

=== Day 7 (28th) ===
In the men's F54/55/56 discus throw, there were three world records: Bulgaria's Mustafa Yuseinov (classification F55) with a throw of 39.42m, Serbia's Drazenko Mitrovic (F56) with a throw of 31.35m, and Cuba's Leonardo Diaz (F56) with a throw of 43.10m.

There was also a world record in the women's F33/34/52/53 javelin: Birgit Kober of Germany with a throw of 23.54m. In the men's 800m T37, Ireland's Michael McKillop, on his birthday, set a world record with a time of 1:58.90.

- Day Seven on YouTube

=== Day 8 (29th) ===
America's Tatyana McFadden took her 4th gold at the championship (200m, 400m, 800m and 1500m T54).

World records: Mariia Pomazan of Ukraine, in the women's discus F35/36 with a throw of 28.73m (1073pts) and Tunisia's Mohamed Farhat Chida in the men's 400m T38 with a time of 49.33sec.

Iran's Seyed Erfan Hosseini Liravi set a world record in the men's javelin F12/13 with a throw of 61.48m, though the gold medal was won by China's Pengkai Zhu with 61.90. Liravi is classified F13 and Zhu is classified F12, and the world record was for F13 classified athletes. (F12: may recognise the shape of a hand, visual acuity of 2/60, and/or visual field of less than 5 degrees. F13: visual acuity ranges from 2/60 to 6/60, and/or visual field over 5 degrees and less than 20 degrees.)

- Day Eight on YouTube

=== Day 9 (30th) ===
Great Britain's David Weir and Shelly Woods, on January 29, pulled out of the marathon for safety reasons, as the roads around the circuit would not be closed to traffic.

Spain's Alberto Suárez Laso set a world record in the men's marathon T12 with a time of 2:28:10.

== Participating nations ==
- Algeria (27)
- Angola (5)
- Argentina (10)
- Australia (46)
- Austria (7)
- Azerbaijan (6)
- Belarus (10)
- Belgium (2)
- Brazil (25)
- Bulgaria (7)
- Canada (25)
- Chile (1)
- China (79)
- Chinese Taipei (2)
- Colombia (6)
- Costa Rica (2)
- Ivory Coast (3)
- Croatia (14)
- Cuba (3)
- Cyprus (1)
- Czech Republic (16)
- Denmark (6)
- Egypt (6)
- Ethiopia (3)
- Fiji (2)
- Finland (7)
- France (24)
- Germany (34)
- Great Britain (40)
- Greece (31)
- Hong Kong (8)
- Hungary (2)
- India (5)
- Iran (13)
- Iraq (6)
- Ireland (8)
- Italy (5)
- Jamaica (3)
- Japan (33)
- Jordan (4)
- Kenya (11)
- Kuwait (8)
- Latvia (5)
- Lithuania (4)
- Malaysia (7)
- Mauritius (1)
- Mexico (32)
- Montenegro (2)
- Morocco (8)
- Namibia (4)
- Netherlands (7)
- New Zealand (8)
- Norway (1)
- Papua New Guinea (1)
- Poland (36)
- Portugal (19)
- Qatar (1)
- Romania (1)
- Russia (53)
- Saudi Arabia (4)
- Serbia (3)
- Singapore (1)
- Slovakia (3)
- Slovenia (4)
- South Africa (34)
- South Korea (7)
- Spain (32)
- Sweden (7)
- Switzerland (11)
- Syria (2)
- Thailand (15)
- Tunisia (11)
- Turkey (3)
- Ukraine (32)
- United Arab Emirates (17)
- United States (50)
- Uzbekistan (4)
- Venezuela (20)

== See also ==
- 2011 World Championships in Athletics
