= Queen Elizabeth II Park =

Multi-use stadium in Christchurch, New Zealand

Queen Elizabeth II Stadium
- QEII
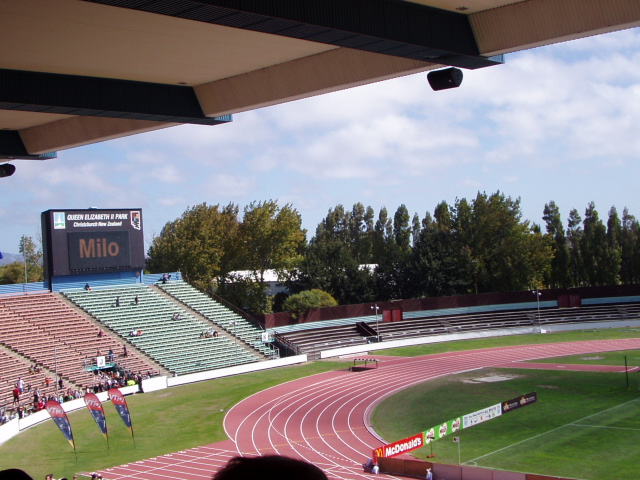
- Interactive map of Queen Elizabeth II Stadium
- Location: Christchurch, New Zealand
- Coordinates: 43°29′29″S 172°42′19″E
- Capacity: 25,000

Construction
- Built: 1973
- Opened: 24 January 1974
- Demolished: 2012

Tenant
- Christchurch United (1974–2011)

Queen Elizabeth II Stadium was a multi-use stadium in Christchurch, New Zealand, located in a large park called Queen Elizabeth II Park. The stadium had a capacity of 25,000 people and was built in 1973 to host the 1974 British Commonwealth Games, with a temporary 10,000 seat western stand erected for that event to take the capacity to 35,000. The stadium suffered some damage in the September 2010 Canterbury earthquake but was able to reopen, only to be damaged beyond repair in the February 2011 Christchurch earthquake.

The park is now home to two schools: Avonside Girls' and Shirley Boys' and Taiora QEII Recreation and Sport Centre – all newly built since the earthquakes.

== Description ==
The facilities were situated in a large park called Queen Elizabeth II Park; the overall land area is 49 hectares (120 acres). Queen Elizabeth II contained a running track, as well as a public swimming and diving pool. There is also a cricket ground, behind the main complex, called "The Village Green", which was the home of the district's first-class cricket team, the Canterbury Wizards. A golf course takes up with north-east corner of Queen Elizabeth II Park.

QEII stadium was designed and built for the 1974 Commonwealth Games. The lead architect was Peter Beaven from Beaven, Hunt and Associates. The principal consultant for the stadium design was civil engineer Bill Lovell-Smith of Lovell-Smith & Cusiel.

A fun park was located adjacent to the pool between the 1980s and early 2000s. The park consisted of Drive World a mini street where visitors could ride mini bikes or mini vehicles around the streets, a mini golf course, a maze, five lane super slide and for a time a mini roller coaster.

== History ==
The stadium hosted many local and international events, including concerts by many famous artists, such as The Eagles, Beach Boys, Kenny Rogers and Dolly Parton, Neil Diamond, David Bowie and Red Hot Chili Peppers.

On 29 November 1978, it hosted a concert of David Bowie as part of his Isolar II – The 1978 World Tour. The venue was also the site of the last concert by Talking Heads in 1984, apart from their brief reformation for their induction into the Rock & Roll Hall of Fame in 2002.

For many years it was the venue for the Christchurch Kids Weet-Bix triathlon, and for athletics and football matches. It was one of venues to host the 2008 FIFA U-17 Women's World Cup and was used as the main stadium for the 2011 IPC Athletics World Championships after repairs from the 2010 earthquake had cleared the facility for use.

Greyhound racing was held at the stadium, with the first meeting there on 29 December 1975. The last meeting at QEII was held on 9 October 1997.

The Christchurch City Council had launched a feasibility study into returning the Commonwealth Games to the city in 2018 with QEII Park to be used for athletics and swimming events – with Lancaster Park to be used for rugby sevens as well as the opening and closing ceremonies. Prime Minister John Key was against the plan, and the February 2011 earthquake ended any prospect.

== Post-earthquake ==
In March 2012, Christchurch City Council released reports showing that the facilities at Queen Elizabeth II Park were beyond repair. The demolition of the stadium and pool complex began in August 2012.

=== Schools ===
In February 2015 the Minister of Education, Hekia Parata, announced that two single-sex high schools damaged in the earthquakes would be rebuilt at Queen Elizabeth II Park: Avonside Girls' and Shirley Boys'. Christchurch City Council sold 11.5 hectares (28 acres) of land to the Ministry of Education for NZ$4.6m for the two schools.

=== New sports centre ===
The concept for a new Eastern Sport & Recreation Centre co-located adjacent to the schools was unveiled in May 2016, with an expected opening date in May 2018.

It opened as Taiora QEII Recreation and Sport Centre on 31 May 2018.

== Rugby league ==
The stadium hosted two rugby league internationals involving New Zealand.

Notable games at the stadium include:

Game#	Date	Result	Attendance	Notes
1	19 June 1985	Australia def. South Island 56–0	6,800	Played as part of the 1985 Kangaroo tour of New Zealand
2	9 July 1989	Australia def. New Zealand 26–6	17,000	Played as part of the 1989 Trans-Tasman Test series
3	15 July 1990	New Zealand def. Great Britain 21–18	3,113	Played as part of the 1990 Great Britain Lions tour

== Gallery ==
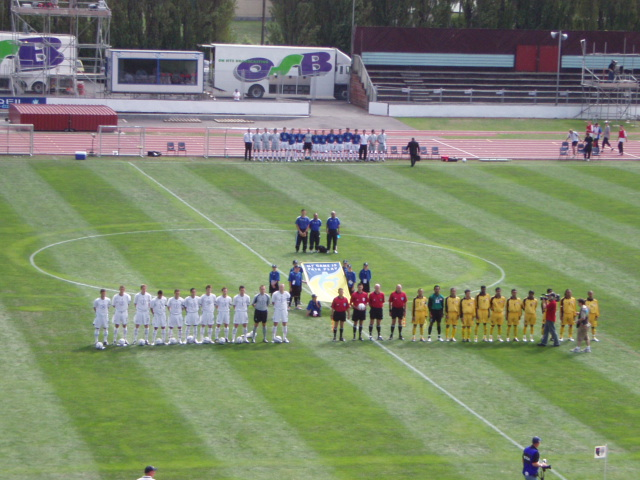
New Zealand and Malaysia line-up before a friendly

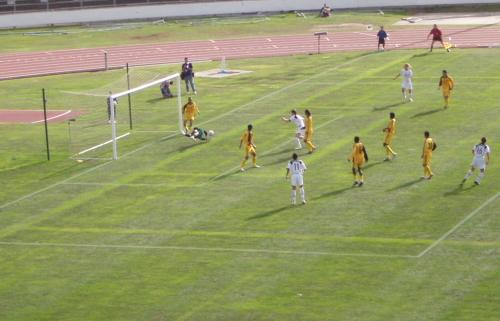
New Zealand attacking the Malaysian goal during a friendly match

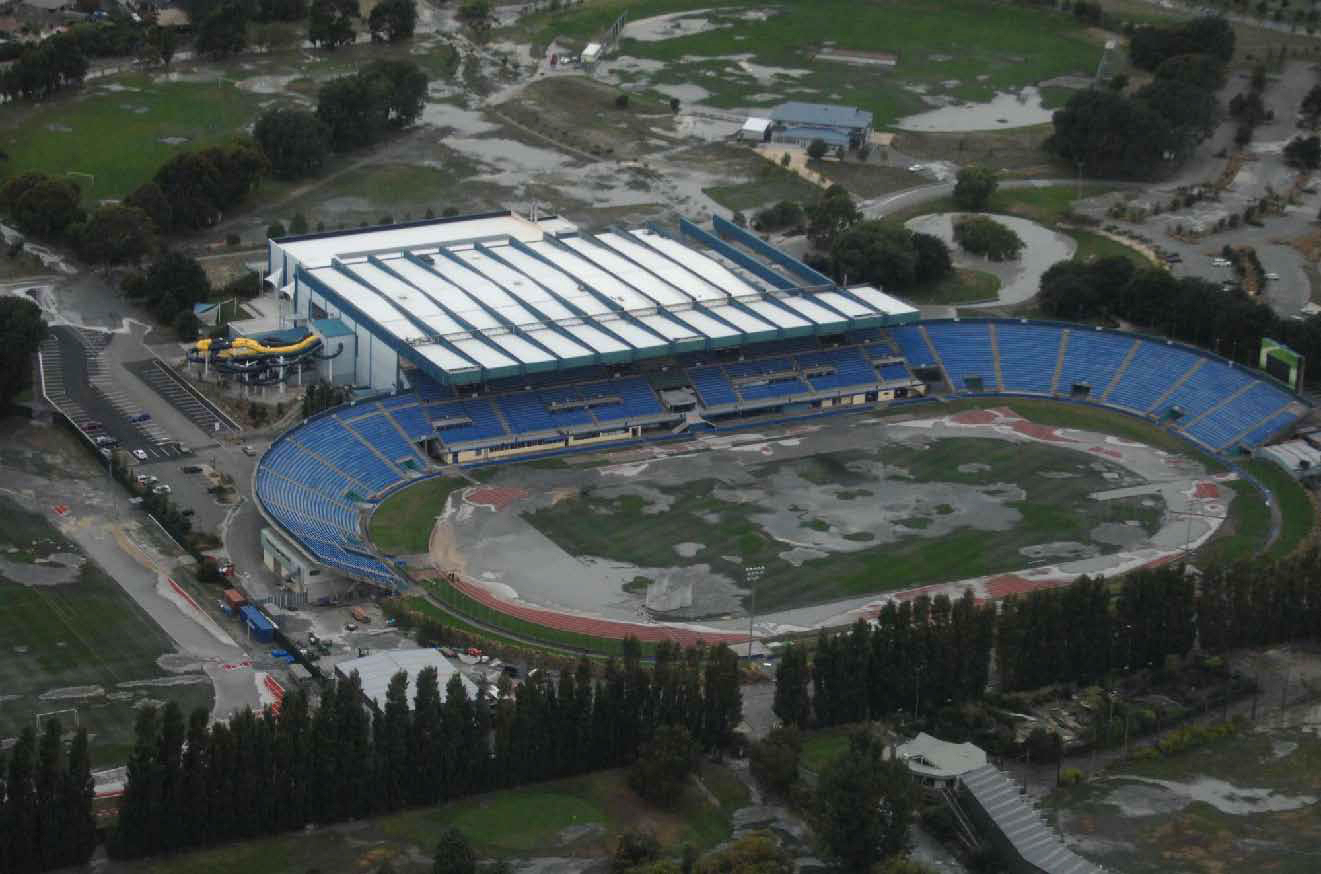
The Stadium after the earthquake, 23 February 2011

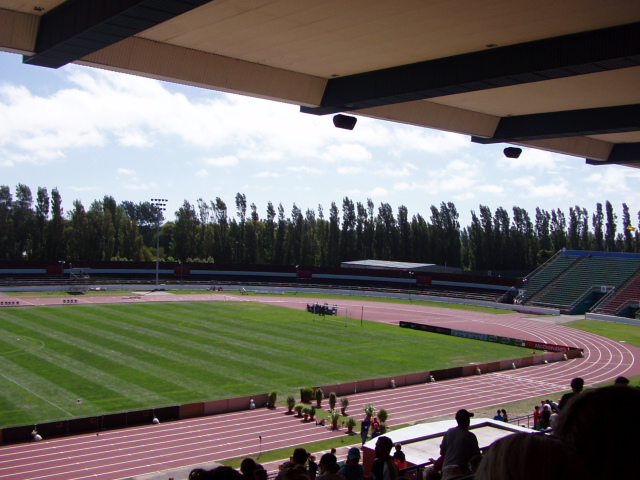
View towards the east end of the Queen Elizabeth II Park, from the main stand

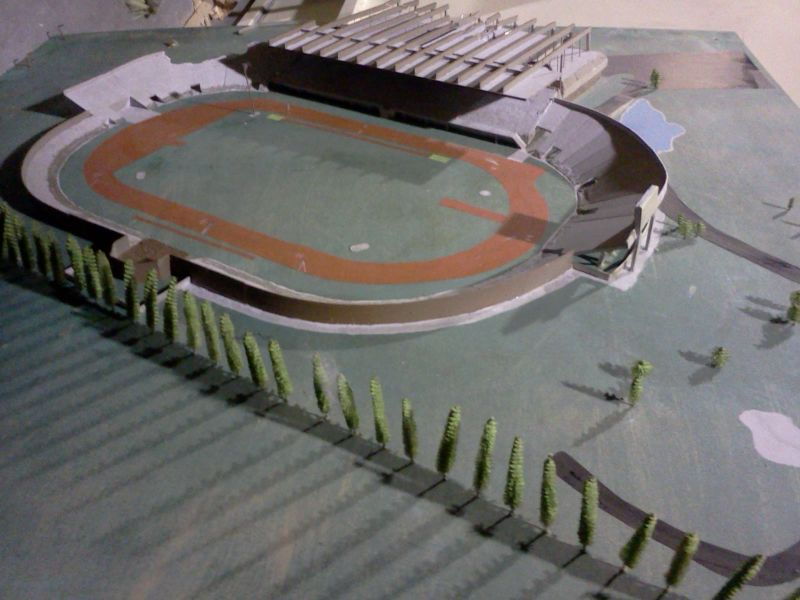
Windtunnel model used at Canterbury University to test changed wind flow patterns upon removal of a temporary grandstand that was erected for the 1974 Commonwealth Games
