= Athletics at the 2012 Summer Paralympics T/F42–46 =

Athletics at the XIV Paralympic Games
- Paralympic Athletics
- Venue: Olympic Stadium; The Mall
- Dates: 31 August – 9 September 2012
- Competitors: 1100 (740 men, 360 women)

Athletics at the 2012 Summer Paralympics
Classification
T/F11–13: Blind and visually impaired
T/F20: Intellectual disability
T/F31–38: Cerebral palsy
F40: Les Autres
T/F42–46: Amputees
T/F51–58: Spinal cord disability
Men T/F42–46
Track
100 m	T42	T44	T46
200 m	T42	T44	T46
400 m	T44	T46
800 m	T46
1500 m	T46
4×100 m relay	T42-46
Road
Marathon	T46
Field
Long jump	F42-44	F46
Triple jump	F46
High jump	F42	F46
Shot put	F42-44	F46
Discus throw	F42	F44
Javelin throw	F42	F44
Women T/F42–46
Track
100 m	T42	T44	T46
200 m	T44	T46
400 m	T46
Field
Long jump	F42-44	F46
Shot put	F42-44
Javelin throw	F46

Athletics events at the 2012 Summer Paralympics were held in the Olympic Stadium and in The Mall in London, United Kingdom, from 31 August to 9 September 2012. 31 events were staged for amputee athletes.

== Classification ==
Athletes were given a classification depending on the type and extent of their disability. The classification system allowed athletes to compete against others with a similar level of function.

The athletics classifications are:

- 11–13: Blind (11) and visually impaired (12, 13) athletes
- 20: Athletes with an intellectual disability
- 31–38: Athletes with cerebral palsy
- 40: Les Autres (others) (including people with dwarfism)
- 42–46: Amputees
- 51–58: Athletes with a spinal cord disability

The class numbers were given prefixes of "T" and "F" for track and field events, respectively.

== Medal summary ==
=== Men's events ===
Event	Classification	Gold	Silver	Bronze
100 m	T42	Heinrich Popow; Germany	Scott Reardon; Australia	Wojtek Czyz; Germany
100 m	T44	Jonnie Peacock; Great Britain	Richard Browne; United States	Arnu Fourie; South Africa
100 m	T46	Zhao Xu; China	Raciel Gonzalez Isidoria; Cuba	Ola Abidogun; Great Britain
200 m	T42	Richard Whitehead; Great Britain	Shaquille Vance; United States	Heinrich Popow; Germany
200 m	T44	Alan Fonteles Cardoso Oliveira; Brazil	Oscar Pistorius; South Africa	Blake Leeper; United States
200 m	T46	Yohansson Nascimento; Brazil	Raciel Gonzalez Isidoria; Cuba	Simon Patmore; Australia
400 m	T44	Oscar Pistorius; South Africa	Blake Leeper; United States	David Prince; United States
400 m	T46	Gunther Matzinger; Austria	Yohansson Nascimento; Brazil	P Uggl Dena Pathirannehelag; Sri Lanka
800 m	T46	Gunther Matzinger; Austria	Samir Nouioua; Algeria	Abraham Tarbei; Kenya
1500 m	T46	Abraham Tarbei; Kenya	Wondiye Fikre Indelbu; Ethiopia	Samir Nouioua; Algeria
4 × 100 m relay	T42/T46	South Africa (RSA); Samkelo Radebe; Zivan Smith; Arnu Fourie; Oscar Pistorius	China (CHN); Liu Zhiming; Liu Fuliang; Xie Hexing; Zhao Xu	Germany (GER); Markus Rehm; Heinrich Popow; David Behre; Wojtek Czyz
Marathon	T46	Tito Sena; Brazil	Abderrahman Ait Khamouch; Spain	Frederic van den Heede; Belgium
Long jump	F42/44	Markus Rehm; Germany	Wojtek Czyz; Germany	Daniel Jorgensen; Denmark
Long jump	F46	Liu Fuliang; China	Arnaud Assoumani; France	Huseyn Hasanov; Azerbaijan
Triple jump	F46	Liu Fuliang; China	Arnaud Assoumani; France	Aliaksandr Subota; Belarus
High jump	F42	Iliesa Delana; Fiji	Girisha Hosanagara Nagarajegowda; India	Lukasz Mamczarz; Poland
High jump	F46	Maciej Lepiato; Poland	Jeff Skiba; United States	Chen Hongjie; China
Shot put	F42/44	Jackie Christiansen; Denmark	Darko Kralj; Croatia	Aled Davies; Great Britain
Shot put	F46	Nikita Prokhorov; Russia	Hou Zhanbiao; China	Tomasz Rebisz; Poland
Discus throw	F42	Aled Davies; Great Britain	Mehrdad Karam Zadeh; Iran	Wang Lezheng; China
Discus throw	F44	Jeremy Campbell; United States	Dan Greaves; Great Britain	Farzad Sepahvand; Iran

=== Women's events ===
Event	Classification	Gold	Silver	Bronze
100 m	T42	Martina Caironi; Italy	Kelly Cartwright; Australia	Jana Schmidt; Germany
100 m	T44	Marie-Amelie le Fur; France	Marlou van Rhijn; Netherlands	April Holmes; United States
100 m	T46	Yunidis Castillo; Cuba	Nikol Rodomakina; Russia	Wang Yanping; China
200 m	T44	Marlou van Rhijn; Netherlands	Marie-Amelie le Fur; France	Katrin Green; Germany
200 m	T46	Yunidis Castillo; Cuba	Alicja Fiodorow; Poland	Anrune Liebenberg; South Africa
400 m	T46	Yunidis Castillo; Cuba	Anrune Liebenberg; South Africa	Alicja Fiodorow; Poland
Long jump	F42/44	Kelly Cartwright; Australia	Stefanie Reid; Great Britain	Marie-Amelie le Fur; France
Long jump	F46	Nikol Rodomakina; Russia	Carlee Beattie; Australia	Ouyang Jingling; China
Shot put	F42/44	Yao Juan; China	Yang Yue; China	Michaela Floeth; Germany
Javelin throw	F46	Katarzyna Piekart; Poland	Nataliya Gudkova; Russia	Madeleine Hogan; Australia

== See also ==
- Athletics at the 2012 Summer Olympics
