= Athletics at the 2012 Summer Paralympics – Women's 200 metres T46 =

Women's 200 metres T46 at the XIV Paralympic Games
- Venue: London Olympic Stadium
- Dates: 31 August to 1 September
- Competitors: 12 from 10 nations
- Winning time: 24.45

Medalists
1st place, gold medalist(s)		Yunidis Castillo	Cuba
2nd place, silver medalist(s)		Alicja Fiodorow	Poland
3rd place, bronze medalist(s)		Anrune Liebenberg	South Africa

Athletics at the 2012 Summer Paralympics
Classification
T/F11–13: Blind and visually impaired
T/F20: Intellectual disability
T/F31–38: Cerebral palsy
F40: Les Autres
T/F42–46: Amputees
T/F51–58: Spinal cord disability
Men T/F42–46
Track
100 m	T42	T44	T46
200 m	T42	T44	T46
400 m	T44	T46
800 m	T46
1500 m	T46
4×100 m relay	T42-46
Road
Marathon	T46
Field
Long jump	F42-44	F46
Triple jump	F46
High jump	F42	F46
Shot put	F42-44	F46
Discus throw	F42	F44
Javelin throw	F42	F44
Women T/F42–46
Track
100 m	T42	T44	T46
200 m	T44	T46
400 m	T46
Field
Long jump	F42-44	F46
Shot put	F42-44
Javelin throw	F46

The Women's 200 metres T46 event at the 2012 Summer Paralympics took place at the London Olympic Stadium from 31 August to 1 September. The event consisted of 2 heats and a final.

The T46 category is for athletes who have a single above or below elbow amputation or similar disability, with normal function in both legs.

== Records ==
Prior to the competition, the existing World and Paralympic records were as follows:

World& Paralympic record	Yunidis Castillo (CUB)	24.72	12 September 2008	Beijing, China
Broken records during the 2012 Summer Paralympics
World record	Yunidis Castillo (CUB)	24.45	1 September 2012	

== Results ==
=== Round 1 ===
Competed 31 August 2012 from 12:05. Qual. rule: first 3 in each heat (Q) plus the 2 fastest other times (q) qualified.

==== Heat 1 ====
Rank	Athlete	Country	Time	Notes
1	Nikol Rodomakina	Russia	26.21	Q
2	Wang Yanping	China	26.55	Q
3	Katarzyna Piekart	Poland	27.21	Q
4	Sally Brown	Great Britain	27.78	
5	Amara Lallwala Palliyagurunnans	Sri Lanka	29.36	
6	Maiya Bisunkhe	Nepal	36.32	
			Wind: -1.6 m/s	

==== Heat 2 ====
Rank	Athlete	Country	Time	Notes
1	Yunidis Castillo	Cuba	24.81	Q
2	Anrune Liebenberg	South Africa	25.79	Q, RR
3	Alicja Fiodorow	Poland	25.92	Q, PB
4	Unyime Uwak	Nigeria	26.65	q, PB
5	Alexandra Moguchaya	Russia	27.48	q, PB
6	Yengus Dese Azenaw	Ethiopia	29.96	
			Wind: Nil	

=== Final ===
Competed 1 September 2012 at 21:53.

Rank	Athlete	Country	Time	Notes
1st place, gold medalist(s)	Yunidis Castillo	Cuba	24.45	WR
2nd place, silver medalist(s)	Alicja Fiodorow	Poland	25.49	RR
3rd place, bronze medalist(s)	Anrune Liebenberg	South Africa	25.55	RR
4	Nikol Rodomakina	Russia	25.56	PB
5	Wang Yanping	China	26.38	RR
6	Unyime Uwak	Nigeria	26.65	=PB
7	Katarzyna Piekart	Poland	27.18	PB
8	Alexandra Moguchaya	Russia	27.47	PB
			Wind: -0.6 m/s	

Q = qualified by place. q = qualified by time. WR = World Record. RR = Regional Record. PB = Personal Best. SB = Seasonal Best.
