= Athletics at the 2012 Summer Paralympics – Women's 100 metres T46 =

Women's 100 metres T46 at the XIV Paralympic Games
- Venue: London Olympic Stadium
- Dates: 4 and 5 September
- Competitors: 13 from 12 nations

Medalists
| 1st place, gold medalist(s) | | Yunidis Castillo | Cuba |
| 2nd place, silver medalist(s) | | Nikol Rodomakina | Russia |
| 3rd place, bronze medalist(s) | | Wang Yanping | China |

Athletics at the 2012 Summer Paralympics
Classification
T/F11–13: Blind and visually impaired
T/F20: Intellectual disability
T/F31–38: Cerebral palsy
F40: Les Autres
T/F42–46: Amputees
T/F51–58: Spinal cord disability
Men T/F42–46
Track
100 m | T42 | T44 | T46
200 m | T42 | T44 | T46
400 m | T44 | T46
800 m | T46
1500 m | T46
4×100 m relay | T42-46
Road
Marathon | T46
Field
Long jump | F42-44 | F46
Triple jump | F46
High jump | F42 | F46
Shot put | F42-44 | F46
Discus throw | F42 | F44
Javelin throw | F42 | F44
Women T/F42–46
Track
100 m | T42 | T44 | T46
200 m | T44 | T46
400 m | T46
Field
Long jump | F42-44 | F46
Shot put | F42-44
Javelin throw | F46

The Women's 100 metres T46 event at the 2012 Summer Paralympics took place at the London Olympic Stadium on 4 and 5 September.

The T46 category is for athletes who have a single above or below elbow amputation or similar disability, with normal function in both legs.

Broken records during the 2012 Summer Paralympics
| World record | Yunidis Castillo (CUB) | 11.95 | London, United Kingdom | 4 September 2012 |

== Results ==
=== Round 1 ===
Competed 4 September 2012 from 12:00. Qual. rule: first 3 in each heat (Q) plus the 2 fastest other times (q) qualified.

==== Heat 1 ====
| Rank | Athlete | Country | Time | Notes |
|---|---|---|---|---|
| 1 | Yunidis Castillo | Cuba | 11.95 | Q, WR |
| 2 | Nikol Rodomakina | Russia | 12.58 | Q |
| 3 | Sally Brown | Great Britain | 13.67 | Q |
| 4 | Styliani Smaragdi | Greece | 13.94 | q, PB |
| 5 | Amara Lallwala Palliyagurunnans | Sri Lanka | 13.96 | PB |
| 6 | Maiya Bisunkhe | Nepal | 16.48 | PB |
| 7 | Ouyang Jingling | China | DNS | |
| | | | Wind: -0.2 m/s | |

==== Heat 2 ====
| Rank | Athlete | Country | Time | Notes |
|---|---|---|---|---|
| 1 | Wang Yanping | China | 12.82 | Q, RR |
| 2 | Katarzyna Piekart | Poland | 13.04 | Q, PB |
| 3 | Sheila Finder | Brazil | 13.13 | Q, PB |
| 4 | Carlee Beattie | Australia | 13.16 | q, SB |
| 5 | Yengus Dese Azenaw | Ethiopia | 14.41 | PB |
| 6 | Ussumane Cande | Guinea-Bissau | 14.87 | SB |
| | | | Wind: +0.4 m/s | |

=== Final ===
Competed 5 September 2012 at 21:17.

| Rank | Athlete | Country | Time | Notes |
|---|---|---|---|---|
| 1st place, gold medalist(s) | Yunidis Castillo | Cuba | 12.01 | |
| 2nd place, silver medalist(s) | Nikol Rodomakina | Russia | 12.49 | RR |
| 3rd place, bronze medalist(s) | Wang Yanping | China | 12.89 | |
| 4 | Katarzyna Piekart | Poland | 13.10 | |
| 5 | Sheila Finder | Brazil | 13.33 | |
| 6 | Sally Brown | Great Britain | 13.74 | |
| 7 | Styliani Smaragdi | Greece | 14.01 | |
| 0 | Carlee Beattie | Australia | DNS | |
| | | | Wind: +0.2 m/s | |

Q = qualified by place. q = qualified by time. WR = World Record. RR = Regional Record. PB = Personal Best. SB = Seasonal Best. DNS = Did not start.
