= Athletics at the 2012 Summer Paralympics – Women's 400 metres T46 =

Women's 400 metres T46 at the XIV Paralympic Games
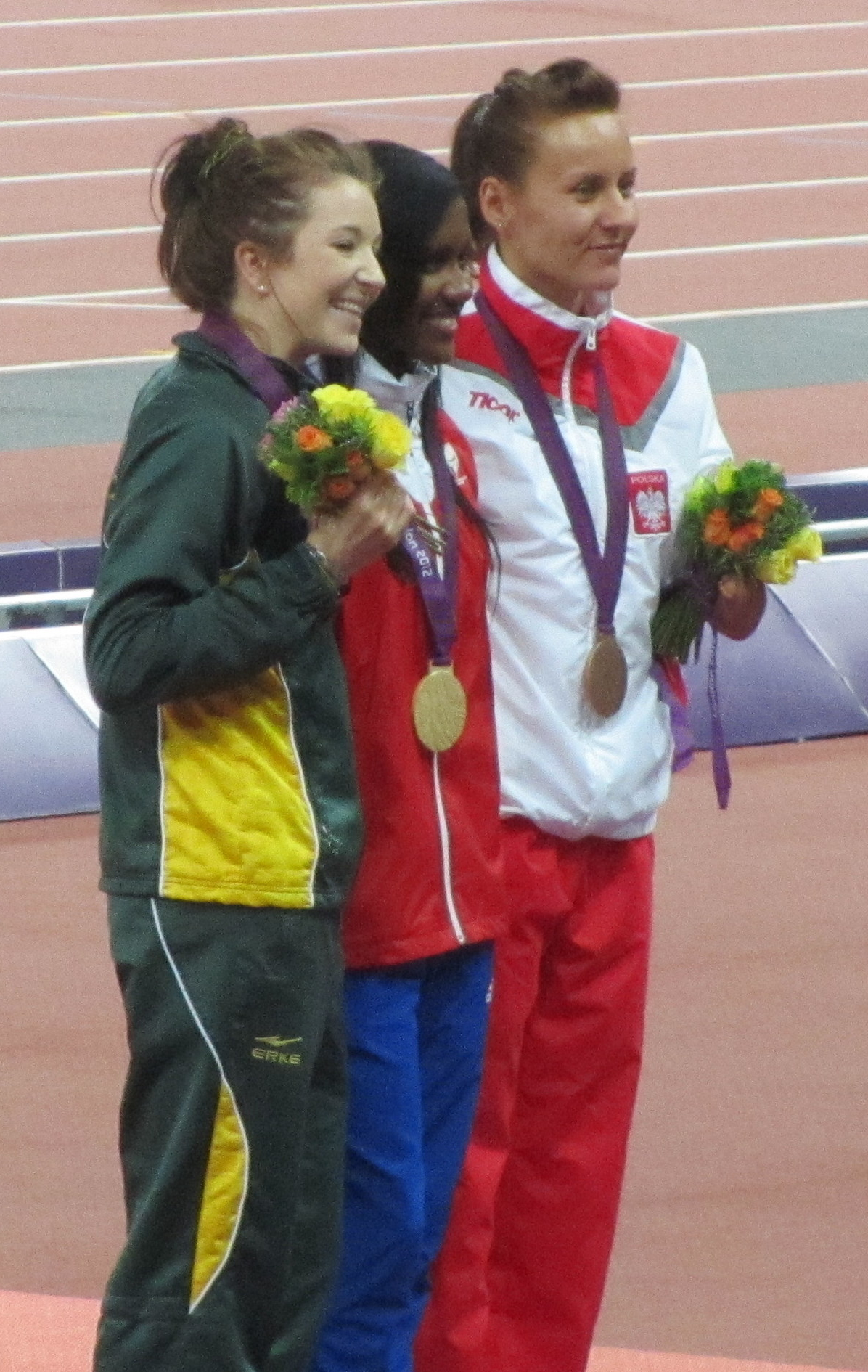
- Left-right: Liebenberg, Castillo, Fiodorow
- Venue: London Olympic Stadium
- Dates: 8 September
- Competitors: 7 from 7 nations
- Winning time: 55.72

Medalists
1st place, gold medalist(s)		Yunidis Castillo	Cuba
2nd place, silver medalist(s)		Anrune Liebenberg	South Africa
3rd place, bronze medalist(s)		Alicja Fiodorow	Poland

Athletics at the 2012 Summer Paralympics
Classification
T/F11–13: Blind and visually impaired
T/F20: Intellectual disability
T/F31–38: Cerebral palsy
F40: Les Autres
T/F42–46: Amputees
T/F51–58: Spinal cord disability
Men T/F42–46
Track
100 m	T42	T44	T46
200 m	T42	T44	T46
400 m	T44	T46
800 m	T46
1500 m	T46
4×100 m relay	T42-46
Road
Marathon	T46
Field
Long jump	F42-44	F46
Triple jump	F46
High jump	F42	F46
Shot put	F42-44	F46
Discus throw	F42	F44
Javelin throw	F42	F44
Women T/F42–46
Track
100 m	T42	T44	T46
200 m	T44	T46
400 m	T46
Field
Long jump	F42-44	F46
Shot put	F42-44
Javelin throw	F46

The Women's 400 metres T46 event at the 2012 Summer Paralympics took place at the London Olympic Stadium on 8 September. The event consisted of a single race.

The T46 category is for athletes who have a single above or below elbow amputation or similar disability, with normal function in both legs.

== Records ==
Prior to the competition, the existing World and Paralympic records were as follows:

World & Paralympic record	Tshotlego Morama (BOT)	55.99	24 September 2004	Athens, Greece
Broken records during the 2012 Summer Paralympics
World record	Yunidis Castillo (CUB)	55.72	8 September 2012	

== Results ==
Competed 8 September 2012 at 20:04.

Rank	Athlete	Country	Time	Notes
1st place, gold medalist(s)	Yunidis Castillo	Cuba	55.72	WR
2nd place, silver medalist(s)	Anrune Liebenberg	South Africa	56.65	PB
3rd place, bronze medalist(s)	Alicja Fiodorow	Poland	58.48	PB
4	Wang Yanping	China	1:01.33	SB
5	Alexandra Moguchaya	Russia	1:02.11	PB
6	Yengus Dese Azenaw	Ethiopia	1:04.93	PB
	Ussumane Cande	Guinea-Bissau	DNS	
