= Athletics at the 2012 Summer Paralympics – Men's 200 metres T46 =

Men's 200 metres T46 at the XIV Paralympic Games
- Venue: London Olympic Stadium
- Dates: 31 August and 2 September
- Competitors: 23 from 17 nations
- Winning time: 22.05

Medalists
1st place, gold medalist(s)		Yohansson Nascimento	Brazil
2nd place, silver medalist(s)		Raciel Gonzalez Isidoria	Cuba
3rd place, bronze medalist(s)		Simon Patmore	Australia

Athletics at the 2012 Summer Paralympics
Classification
T/F11–13: Blind and visually impaired
T/F20: Intellectual disability
T/F31–38: Cerebral palsy
F40: Les Autres
T/F42–46: Amputees
T/F51–58: Spinal cord disability
Men T/F42–46
Track
100 m	T42	T44	T46
200 m	T42	T44	T46
400 m	T44	T46
800 m	T46
1500 m	T46
4×100 m relay	T42-46
Road
Marathon	T46
Field
Long jump	F42-44	F46
Triple jump	F46
High jump	F42	F46
Shot put	F42-44	F46
Discus throw	F42	F44
Javelin throw	F42	F44
Women T/F42–46
Track
100 m	T42	T44	T46
200 m	T44	T46
400 m	T46
Field
Long jump	F42-44	F46
Shot put	F42-44
Javelin throw	F46

The Men's 200 metres T46 event at the 2012 Summer Paralympics took place at the London Olympic Stadium on 31 August and 2 September.

The T46 category is for athletes who have a single above or below elbow amputation or similar disability, with normal function in both legs. The event was also open to category T45 double arm amputees, and the gold medal was won by T45 athlete Yohansson Nascimento of Brazil.

== Records ==
Prior to the competition, the existing World and Paralympic records were as follows:

T45	World record	Yohansson Nascimento (BRA)	22.34	17 November 2011	Guadalajara, Mexico
T45	Paralympic record	Vitalis Lanshima (NGR)	22.82	27 October 2008	Sydney, Australia
T45	Broken records during the 2012 Summer Paralympics				
T45	Paralympic record	Zhao Xu (CHN)	22.62	31 August 2012	
T45	World record	Yohansson Nascimento (BRA)	22.27	31 August 2012	
T45	World record	Yohansson Nascimento (BRA)	22.05	2 September 2012	
T46	World & Paralympic record	Heath Francis (AUS)	21.74	9 September 2008	Beijing, China

== Results ==
=== Round 1 ===
Competed 31 August 2012 from 21:00. Qual. rule: first 2 in each heat (Q) plus the 2 fastest other times (q) qualified.

==== Heat 1 ====
Rank	Athlete	Country	Class	Time	Notes
1	Antonis Aresti	Cyprus	T46	22.43	Q, RR
2	Zhao Xu	China	T45	22.62	Q, PR(T45)
3	Suwaibidu Galadima	Nigeria	T46	22.98	
4	Emicarlo Souza	Brazil	T46	23.01	=SB
5	Mahamane Sacko	Mali	T46	23.02	
6	Francis Kompaon	Papua New Guinea	T46	23.05	PB
7	Ola Abidogun	Great Britain	T46	23.26	
8	Addoh Kimou	Ivory Coast	T46	23.70	
				Wind: -0.2 m/s	

==== Heat 2 ====
Rank	Athlete	Country	Class	Time	Notes
1	Simon Patmore	Australia	T46	22.68	Q
2	Yury Nosulenko	Russia	T46	23.24	Q
3	Roger Tapia	Philippines	T46	23.74	
4	Revelinot Raherinandrasana	Madagascar	T46	26.41	
5	Kouame Jean-Luc Noumbo	Ivory Coast	T46	DNF	
6	Antônio Souza	Brazil	T46	DNS	
7	Bashiru Yunusa	Nigeria	T46	DNS	
				Wind: +0.5 m/s	

==== Heat 3 ====
Rank	Athlete	Country	Class	Time	Notes
1	Raciel Gonzalez Isidoria	Cuba	T46	22.09	Q, RR
2	Yohansson Nascimento	Brazil	T45	22.27	Q, WR(T45)
3	Yao Jianjun	China	T46	22.68	q
4	Saidi Adedeji	Nigeria	T46	22.87	q
5	Tomoki Tagawa	Japan	T46	23.04	
6	Tobi Fawehinmi	United States	T46	23.29	
7	Pradeep Uggl Dena Pathirannehelag	Sri Lanka	T46	23.40	
8	Mohamed Kamara	Sierra Leone	T46	24.46	
				Wind: Nil	

=== Final ===
Competed 2 September 2012 at 19:30.

Rank	Athlete	Country	Class	Time	Notes
1st place, gold medalist(s)	Yohansson Nascimento	Brazil	T45	22.05	WR(T45)
2nd place, silver medalist(s)	Raciel Gonzalez Isidoria	Cuba	T46	22.15	
3rd place, bronze medalist(s)	Simon Patmore	Australia	T46	22.36	
4	Antonis Aresti	Cyprus	T46	22.40	RR
5	Yao Jianjun	China	T46	22.81	SB
6	Yury Nosulenko	Russia	T46	22.88	
7	Saidi Adedeji	Nigeria	T46	23.02	SB
	Zhao Xu	China	T45	DQ	
				Wind: +0.1 m/s	

Q = qualified by place. q = qualified by time. WR = World Record. PR = Paralympic Record. RR = Regional Record. PB = Personal Best. SB = Seasonal Best. DQ = Disqualified. DNS = Did not start. DNF = Did not finish.
