= Guinea-Bissau at the 2012 Summer Paralympics =

- IPC code: GBS
- NPC: Guinea-Bissau Federation of Sports for the Disabled

in London
- Competitors: 2 in 1 sport
- Medals: Gold 0 Silver 0 Bronze 0 Total 0

Summer Paralympics appearances (overview)
- 2012; 2016; 2020; 2024

Guinea-Bissau made its Paralympic Games debut by sending a delegation to compete at the 2012 Summer Paralympics in London, United Kingdom, having made its Olympic debut at 1996 Games. The delegation consisted of two athletes, Cesar Lopes Cardoso and Ussumane Cande, who both competed in track and field events. Neither athlete won a medal, with neither getting past the first round of their events.

== Background ==
Guinea-Bissau, a country in West Africa, first participated in a Summer Olympics at the 1996 Games in Atlanta, United States. They participated on five occasions up to and including the 2012 Summer Olympics in London but failed to win any medals along the way.

Members representing Guinea-Bissau joined the International Paralympic Committee in 1997, but did not attend the IPC General Assembly that year. However, the nation made did not make its Paralympic debut until the 2012 Summer Paralympics in London.

== Athletics ==
Cesar Lopes Cardoso started competing in athletics in 2003. He competed in the men's T46 400 metres, aged 31. The T46 classification is an athlete who has, "Upper limb/s affected by limb deficiency, impaired muscle power or impaired range of movement." In the event, Lopes Cardoso was drawn in heat one, a heat containing eventual gold medalist Günther Matzinger of Austria. Lopes Cardoso ran a time of 55.08 seconds, a season's best for him, to finish last in the seven-man heat. He was 5.17 seconds behind the heat winner, Matzinger, and 3.56 seconds behind the second-last finisher, Russian Alexey Kotlov. Lopes Cardoso's was the slowest overall in the heat round and he did not progress to the final.

Ussumane Cande was due to compete in two event at the 2012 Paralympics, the women's T46 100 metres and the women's T46 400 metres. In the 100 metres, Cande raced in heat two on 4 September 2012. In her race, Cande had a time 14.87 seconds, to finish last in her heat of six women. Cande was 2.05 seconds behind the heat winner, Wang Yanping of China. Cande's time was faster than only one other athlete in the heat round, Nepalese Maiya Bisunkhe who ran a time of 16.48 seconds. Cande did not qualify for the final. In the 400 metres, Cande was due to race in the final (the event had no heats) but did not; it was won by Cuban Yunidis Castillo.

Athlete	Event	Heat		Final	
Athlete	Event	Result	Rank	Result	Rank
Cesar Lopes Cardoso	Men's 400m T46	55.08	7	Did not advance	
Ussumane Cande	Women's 100m T46	14.87	6	Did not advance	
Ussumane Cande	Women's 400m T46	—		DNS	

== See also ==
- Guinea-Bissau at the Paralympics
- Guinea-Bissau at the 2012 Summer Olympics
