= Athletics at the 2012 Summer Paralympics – Men's 800 metres T46 =

Men's 800 metres T46 at the XIV Paralympic Games
- Venue: London Olympic Stadium
- Dates: 6 to 8 September
- Competitors: 19 from 15 nations
- Winning time: 1:51.82

Medalists
1st place, gold medalist(s)		Gunther Matzinger	Austria
2nd place, silver medalist(s)		Samir Nouioua	Algeria
3rd place, bronze medalist(s)		Abraham Tarbei	Kenya

Athletics at the 2012 Summer Paralympics
Classification
T/F11–13: Blind and visually impaired
T/F20: Intellectual disability
T/F31–38: Cerebral palsy
F40: Les Autres
T/F42–46: Amputees
T/F51–58: Spinal cord disability
Men T/F42–46
Track
100 m	T42	T44	T46
200 m	T42	T44	T46
400 m	T44	T46
800 m	T46
1500 m	T46
4×100 m relay	T42-46
Road
Marathon	T46
Field
Long jump	F42-44	F46
Triple jump	F46
High jump	F42	F46
Shot put	F42-44	F46
Discus throw	F42	F44
Javelin throw	F42	F44
Women T/F42–46
Track
100 m	T42	T44	T46
200 m	T44	T46
400 m	T46
Field
Long jump	F42-44	F46
Shot put	F42-44
Javelin throw	F46

The Men's 800 metres T46 event at the 2012 Summer Paralympics took place at the London Olympic Stadium from 6 to 8 September.

The T46 category is for athletes who have a single above or below elbow amputation or similar disability, with normal function in both legs.

== Records ==
Prior to the competition, the existing World and Paralympic records were as follows:

World & Paralympic record	Marcin Awizen (POL)	1:52.36	15 September 2008	Beijing, China
Broken records during the 2012 Summer Paralympics
World record	Gunther Matzinger (AUT)	1:51.82	8 September 2012	

== Results ==
=== Round 1 ===
Competed 6 September 2012 from 10:58. Qual. rule: first 3 in each heat (Q) plus the 2 fastest other times (q) qualified.

==== Heat 1 ====
Rank	Athlete	Country	Time	Notes
1	Gunther Matzinger	Austria	1:55.33	Q, SB
2	Samir Nouioua	Algeria	1:55.38	Q
3	Abraham Tarbei	Kenya	1:55.39	Q, SB
4	Jonah Kipkemoi Chesum	Kenya	1:55.51	q, PB
5	Abdelhadi El Harti	Morocco	1:56.62	q, PB
6	Tesfalem Gebru Kebede	Ethiopia	1:57.22	SB
7	Matthew Silcocks	Australia	1:58.51	
8	Cahit Kilicaslan	Turkey	1:59.14	PB
9	Chris Hammer	United States	2:04.68	

==== Heat 2 ====
Rank	Athlete	Country	Time	Notes
1	Mohamed Fouzai	Tunisia	1:58.08	Q, SB
2	Hermas Muvunyi	Rwanda	1:58.18	Q, SB
3	Stanley Cheruiyot	Kenya	1:59.23	Q, SB
4	Kiross Tekle Redae	Ethiopia	1:59.95	SB
5	Alexey Kotlov	Russia	2:00.21	
6	Remy Nikobimeze	Burundi	2:00.25	PB
7	Marcin Awizen	Poland	2:01.32	SB
8	Davide Dalla Palma	Italy	2:02.24	
9	Samuel Colmenares	Venezuela	2:05.40	SB
10	Michael Roeger	Australia	DNF	

=== Final ===
Competed 8 September 2012 at 21:02.

Rank	Athlete	Country	Time	Notes
1st place, gold medalist(s)	Gunther Matzinger	Austria	1:51.82	WR
2nd place, silver medalist(s)	Samir Nouioua	Algeria	1:52.33	RR
3rd place, bronze medalist(s)	Abraham Tarbei	Kenya	1:53.03	SB
4	Mohamed Fouzai	Tunisia	1:54.94	PB
5	Abdelhadi El Harti	Morocco	1:56.19	PB
6	Jonah Kipkemoi Chesum	Kenya	1:56.57	
7	Stanley Cheruiyot	Kenya	2:03.78	
	Hermas Muvunyi	Rwanda	DQ	

Q = qualified by place. q = qualified by time. WR = World Record. RR = Regional Record. PB = Personal Best. SB = Seasonal Best. DNF = Did not finish.
