= Athletics at the 2012 Summer Paralympics – Men's 100 metres T46 =

Men's 100 metres T46 at the XIV Paralympic Games
- Venue: London Olympic Stadium
- Dates: 6 September
- Competitors: 23 from 19 nations

Medalists
| 1st place, gold medalist(s) | | Zhao Xu | China |
| 2nd place, silver medalist(s) | | Raciel Gonzalez Isidoria | Cuba |
| 3rd place, bronze medalist(s) | | Ola Abidogun | Great Britain |

Athletics at the 2012 Summer Paralympics
Classification
T/F11–13: Blind and visually impaired
T/F20: Intellectual disability
T/F31–38: Cerebral palsy
F40: Les Autres
T/F42–46: Amputees
T/F51–58: Spinal cord disability
Men T/F42–46
Track
100 m | T42 | T44 | T46
200 m | T42 | T44 | T46
400 m | T44 | T46
800 m | T46
1500 m | T46
4×100 m relay | T42-46
Road
Marathon | T46
Field
Long jump | F42-44 | F46
Triple jump | F46
High jump | F42 | F46
Shot put | F42-44 | F46
Discus throw | F42 | F44
Javelin throw | F42 | F44
Women T/F42–46
Track
100 m | T42 | T44 | T46
200 m | T44 | T46
400 m | T46
Field
Long jump | F42-44 | F46
Shot put | F42-44
Javelin throw | F46

The Men's 100 metres T46 event at the 2012 Summer Paralympics took place at the London Olympic Stadium on 6 September.

The T46 category is for athletes who have a single above or below elbow amputation or similar disability, with normal function in both legs. There being no event for T45 competitors - double arm amputees - two such athletes took part in this event, and one of them, Zhao Xu of China, took the gold medal.

== Records ==
Prior to the competition, the existing World and Paralympic records were as follows.

| World & Paralympic record | Adeoye Ajibola (NGR) | 10.72 | Barcelona, Spain | 6 September 1992 |

== Results ==
=== Round 1 ===
Competed 6 September 2012 from 11:55. Qual. rule: first 2 in each heat (Q) plus the 2 fastest other times (q) qualified.

==== Heat 1 ====
| Rank | Athlete | Country | Class | Time | Notes |
|---|---|---|---|---|---|
| 1 | Zhao Xu | China | T45 | 11.06 | Q, PRC |
| 2 | Frank Johnwill | Nigeria | T46 | 11.12 | Q, SB |
| 3 | Yury Nosulenko | Russia | T46 | 11.26 | SB |
| 4 | Saeed Alkhaldi | Saudi Arabia | T46 | 11.41 | SB |
| 5 | Elliot Mujaji | Zimbabwe | T46 | 13.12 | SB |
| 6 | Gabriel Cole | Australia | T46 | 17.82 | |
| 7 | Mahamane Sacko | Mali | T46 | DQ | |
| 8 | Kouame Jean-Luc Noumbo | Ivory Coast | T46 | DNS | |
| | | | Wind: Calm m/s | | |

==== Heat 2 ====
| Rank | Athlete | Country | Class | Time | Notes |
|---|---|---|---|---|---|
| 1 | Yohansson Nascimento | Brazil | T45 | 10.94 | Q, WRC |
| 2 | Raciel Gonzalez Isidoria | Cuba | T46 | 10.97 | Q, PB |
| 3 | Francis Kompaon | Papua New Guinea | T46 | 11.21 | q, PB |
| 4 | Suwaibidu Galadima | Nigeria | T46 | 11.24 | q, SB |
| 5 | Antonis Aresti | Cyprus | T46 | 11.34 | |
| 6 | Samkelo Radebe | South Africa | T45 | 11.53 | |
| 7 | Mohamed Kamara | Sierra Leone | T46 | 11.97 | SB |
| 8 | Arnaud Assoumani | France | T46 | DNS | |
| | | | Wind: +0.2 m/s | | |

==== Heat 3 ====
| Rank | Athlete | Country | Class | Time | Notes |
|---|---|---|---|---|---|
| 1 | Ola Abidogun | Great Britain | T46 | 11.21 | Q |
| 2 | Tomoki Tagawa | Japan | T46 | 11.29 | Q, SB |
| 3 | Saidi Adedeji | Nigeria | T46 | 11.35 | SB |
| 4 | Antônio Souza | Brazil | T46 | 11.36 | |
| 5 | Yao Jianjun | China | T46 | 11.43 | SB |
| 6 | Roger Tapia | Philippines | T46 | 11.75 | |
| 7 | Ibrahim Mamoudou Tamangue | Niger | T46 | 12.29 | SB |
| | | | Wind: +0.6 m/s | | |

=== Final ===
Competed 6 September 2012 at 20:12.

| Rank | Athlete | Country | Class | Time | Notes |
|---|---|---|---|---|---|
| 1 | Zhao Xu | China | T45 | 11.05 | RR |
| 2 | Raciel Gonzalez Isidoria | Cuba | T46 | 11.08 | |
| 3 | Ola Abidogun | Great Britain | T46 | 11.23 | |
| 4 | Suwaibidu Galadima | Nigeria | T46 | 11.31 | |
| 5 | Tomoki Tagawa | Japan | T46 | 11.32 | |
| 6 | Frank Johnwill | Nigeria | T46 | 11.34 | |
| 7 | Francis Kompaon | Papua New Guinea | T46 | 12.28 | |
| 8 | Yohansson Nascimento | Brazil | T45 | 30.79 | |
| | | | Wind: +0.2 m/s | | |

Q = qualified by place. q = qualified by time. WRC = World Record for athlete's classification. PRC = Paralympic Record for athlete's classification. RR = Regional Record. PB = Personal Best. SB = Seasonal Best. DQ = Disqualified. DNS = Did not start.
