= Athletics at the 2012 Summer Paralympics – Men's 1500 metres T46 =

Men's 1500 metres T46 at the XIV Paralympic Games
- Venue: London Olympic Stadium
- Dates: 1 to 4 September
- Competitors: 18 from 15 nations
- Winning time: 3:50.15

Medalists
1st place, gold medalist(s)		Abraham Tarbei	Kenya
2nd place, silver medalist(s)		Wondiye Fikre Indelbu	Ethiopia
3rd place, bronze medalist(s)		Samir Nouioua	Algeria

Athletics at the 2012 Summer Paralympics
Classification
T/F11–13: Blind and visually impaired
T/F20: Intellectual disability
T/F31–38: Cerebral palsy
F40: Les Autres
T/F42–46: Amputees
T/F51–58: Spinal cord disability
Men T/F42–46
Track
100 m	T42	T44	T46
200 m	T42	T44	T46
400 m	T44	T46
800 m	T46
1500 m	T46
4×100 m relay	T42-46
Road
Marathon	T46
Field
Long jump	F42-44	F46
Triple jump	F46
High jump	F42	F46
Shot put	F42-44	F46
Discus throw	F42	F44
Javelin throw	F42	F44
Women T/F42–46
Track
100 m	T42	T44	T46
200 m	T44	T46
400 m	T46
Field
Long jump	F42-44	F46
Shot put	F42-44
Javelin throw	F46

The Men's 1500 metres T46 event at the 2012 Summer Paralympics took place at the London Olympic Stadium from 1 to 4 September.

The T46 category is for athletes who have a single above or below elbow amputation or similar disability, with normal function in both legs.

== Records ==
Prior to the competition, the existing World and Paralympic records were as follows:

World & Paralympic record	Abraham Tarbei (KEN)	3:52.50	10 September 2008	Beijing, China
Broken records during the 2012 Summer Paralympics
World record	Abraham Tarbei (KEN)	3:50.15	4 September 2012	

== Results ==
=== Round 1 ===
Competed 1 September 2012 from 12:53. Qual. rule: first 3 in each heat (Q) plus the 2 fastest other times (q) qualified.

==== Heat 1 ====
Rank	Athlete	Country	Time	Notes
1	Samir Nouioua	Algeria	3:57.27	Q
2	Jonah Kipkemoi Chesum	Kenya	3:59.72	Q, SB
3	Matthew Silcocks	Australia	4:05.48	Q
4	Cahit Kilicaslan	Turkey	4:08.55	Q
5	Tesfalem Gebru Kebede	Ethiopia	4:09.51	SB
6	Remy Nikobimeze	Burundi	4:10.70	
7	Isidro Vildosola	Philippines	4:30.42	SB
8	Houssein Omar Hassan	Djibouti	11:23.50	SB
9	Marcin Awizen	Poland	DNF	

==== Heat 2 ====
Rank	Athlete	Country	Time	Notes
1	Abraham Tarbei	Kenya	3:59.79	Q, SB
2	Wondiye Fikre Indelbu	Ethiopia	4:00.21	Q, SB
3	Mohamed Fouzai	Tunisia	4:01.23	Q
4	David Emong	Uganda	4:01.54	q, PB
5	Stanley Cheruiyot	Kenya	4:01.58	q, PB
6	Chris Hammer	United States	4:03.41	q
7	Davide Dalla Palma	Italy	4:03.58	q, PB
8	Theoneste Nsengimana	Rwanda	4:08.83	
9	Naeem Masih	Pakistan	4:51.35	SB

=== Final ===
Competed 4 September 2012 at 20:24.

Rank	Athlete	Country	Time	Notes
1st place, gold medalist(s)	Abraham Tarbei	Kenya	3:50.15	WR
2nd place, silver medalist(s)	Wondiye Fikre Indelbu	Ethiopia	3:50.87	PB
3rd place, bronze medalist(s)	Samir Nouioua	Algeria	3:51.80	PB
4	David Emong	Uganda	3:58.47	PB
5	Mohamed Fouzai	Tunisia	3:58.79	SB
6	Matthew Silcocks	Australia	3:59.79	PB
7	Jonah Kipkemoi Chesum	Kenya	4:00.38	
8	Cahit Kilicaslan	Turkey	4:00.77	PB
9	Chris Hammer	United States	4:01.76	
10	Davide Dalla Palma	Italy	4:02.26	PB
11	Stanley Cheruiyot	Kenya	4:02.54	

Q = qualified by place. q = qualified by time. WR = World Record. PB = Personal Best. SB = Seasonal Best. DNF = Did not finish.
