= Athletics at the 2022 Commonwealth Games – Men's 100 metres (T47) =

Men's 100 metres (T47) at the 2022 Commonwealth Games
- Venue: Alexander Stadium
- Dates: 2 August
- Competitors: 10 from 6 nations
- Winning time: 10.94

Medalists
gold medal	Emmanuel Oyinbo-Coker	England
silver medal	Jaydon Page	Australia
bronze medal	Ola Abidogun	England

The men's 100 metres (T47) at the 2022 Commonwealth Games, as part of the athletics programme, took place in the Alexander Stadium on 2 August 2022.

== Records ==
Prior to this competition, the existing world and Games records were as follows:

Records T45
World record	Yohansson Nascimento (BRA)	10.94	London, United Kingdom	6 September 2012
Records T46 / T47
World record	Petrúcio Ferreira (BRA)	10.29	São Paulo, Brazil	31 March 2022

== Schedule ==
The schedule was as follows:

Date	Time	Round
Tuesday 2 August 2022	19:40	First round
Tuesday 2 August 2022	21:44	Final

All times are British Summer Time (UTC+1)

== Results ==
=== First round ===
First 3 in each heat (Q) and the next 2 fastest (q) advance to the Final

Wind: Heat 1: -0.6 m/s, Heat 2: -0.9 m/s

Rank	Heat	Lane	Name	Sport class	Result	Notes
1	1	4	Jaydon Page (AUS)	T47	11.17	Q
2	2	6	Emmanuel Oyinbo-Coker (ENG)	T47	11.19	Q
3	2	7	Ola Abidogun (ENG)	T47	11.31	Q
4	2	4	Suwaibidu Galadima (NGR)	T47	11.45	Q, PB
5	1	3	James Arnott (ENG)	T46	11.50	Q, SB
6	1	6	Bradley Murere (NAM)	T46	11.57 (.566)	Q
7	1	7	Shane Hudson (JAM)	T47	11.57 (.568)	q, PB
8	2	5	Jonathan Ferguson (JAM)	T47	11.67	q
9	2	3	Anthony Jordan (AUS)	T47	11.85	
10	1	5	Thomas Normandeau (CAN)	T47	11.87	

=== Final ===
The medals were determined in the final.

Wind: +0.5m/s

Rank	Lane	Name	Sport class	Result	Notes
1st place, gold medalist(s)	3	Emmanuel Oyinbo-Coker (ENG)	T47	10.94	GR, PB
2nd place, silver medalist(s)	6	Jaydon Page (AUS)	T47	11.10	
3rd place, bronze medalist(s)	5	Ola Abidogun (ENG)	T47	11.13	SB
4	4	James Arnott (ENG)	T46	11.45	SB
5	8	Bradley Murere (NAM)	T46	11.62	
6	2	Shane Hudson (JAM)	T47	11.72	
7	1	Jonathan Ferguson (JAM)	T47	11.73	
	7	Suwaibidu Galadima (NGR)	T47	DQ	WPA 17.8
