= Athletics at the 2012 Summer Paralympics – Men's 200 metres T44 =

Men's 200 metres T44 at the XIV Paralympic Games
- Venue: London Olympic Stadium
- Dates: 1 and 2 September
- Competitors: 18 from 15 nations
- Winning time: 21.45

Medalists
1st place, gold medalist(s)		Alan Fonteles Cardoso; Oliveira	Brazil
2nd place, silver medalist(s)		Oscar Pistorius	South Africa
3rd place, bronze medalist(s)		Blake Leeper	United States

Athletics at the 2012 Summer Paralympics
Classification
T/F11–13: Blind and visually impaired
T/F20: Intellectual disability
T/F31–38: Cerebral palsy
F40: Les Autres
T/F42–46: Amputees
T/F51–58: Spinal cord disability
Men T/F42–46
Track
100 m	T42	T44	T46
200 m	T42	T44	T46
400 m	T44	T46
800 m	T46
1500 m	T46
4×100 m relay	T42-46
Road
Marathon	T46
Field
Long jump	F42-44	F46
Triple jump	F46
High jump	F42	F46
Shot put	F42-44	F46
Discus throw	F42	F44
Javelin throw	F42	F44
Women T/F42–46
Track
100 m	T42	T44	T46
200 m	T44	T46
400 m	T46
Field
Long jump	F42-44	F46
Shot put	F42-44
Javelin throw	F46

The Men's 200 metres T44 event at the 2012 Summer Paralympics took place at the London Olympic Stadium on 1 and 2 September.

The T44 category is for athletes who have a single below knee amputation or who can walk with moderately reduced function in one or both legs. The race was also open to category T43 double amputees, and in the final T43 contestants took all 3 medals.

== Records ==
Prior to the competition, the existing World and Paralympic records were as follows:

T43	World record	Oscar Pistorius (RSA)	21.58	5 April 2007	Johannesburg, South Africa
T43	Paralympic record	Oscar Pistorius (RSA)	21.67	13 September 2008	Beijing, China
T43	Broken records during the 2012 Summer Paralympics				
T43	World record	Oscar Pistorius (RSA)	21.30	1 September 2012	
T44	World & Paralympic record	Jim Bob Bizzell (USA)	22.62	13 September 2008	Beijing, China
T44	Broken records during the 2012 Summer Paralympics				
T44	World record	Arnu Fourie (RSA)	22.57	1 September 2012	
T44	World record	Arnu Fourie (RSA)	22.49	2 September 2012	

== Results ==
=== Round 1 ===
Competed 1 September 2012 from 20:22. Qual. rule: first 2 in each heat (Q) plus the 2 fastest other times (q) qualified.

==== Heat 1 ====
Rank	Athlete	Country	Class	Time	Notes
1	Alan Fonteles Cardoso Oliveira	Brazil	T43	21.88	Q, PB
2	Jerome Singleton	United States	T44	23.23	Q
3	Alister McQueen	Canada	T44	24.25	
4	Ivan Prokopyev	Russia	T43	24.26	PB
5	Jean-Baptiste Alaize	France	T44	24.42	
6	Jack Swift	Australia	T44	24.88	
				Wind: -0.3 m/s	

==== Heat 2 ====
Rank	Athlete	Country	Class	Time	Notes
1	Blake Leeper	United States	T43	22.23	Q
2	Arnu Fourie	South Africa	T44	22.57	Q, WR(T44)
3	David Behre	Germany	T43	23.65	q, SB
4	Christoph Bausch	Switzerland	T44	24.22	q
5	Robert Mayer	Austria	T44	24.67	
6	Jia Tianlei	China	T44	25.62	SB
				Wind: -0.8 m/s	

==== Heat 3 ====
Rank	Athlete	Country	Class	Time	Notes
1	Oscar Pistorius	South Africa	T43	21.30	Q, WR(T43)
2	Jim Bob Bizzell	United States	T44	23.64	Q
3	Keita Sato	Japan	T44	24.34	RR
4	Riccardo Scendoni	Italy	T44	24.51	
5	Marcio Fernandes	Cape Verde	T44	24.84	
6	D.M.A. Pituwala Kankanange	Sri Lanka	T44	26.23	
				Wind: -0.1 m/s	

=== Final ===
Competed 2 September 2012 at 21:15.

Rank	Athlete	Country	Class	Time	Notes
1st place, gold medalist(s)	Alan Fonteles Cardoso Oliveira	Brazil	T43	21.45	RR
2nd place, silver medalist(s)	Oscar Pistorius	South Africa	T43	21.52	
3rd place, bronze medalist(s)	Blake Leeper	United States	T43	22.46	
4	Arnu Fourie	South Africa	T44	22.49	WR(T44)
5	Jerome Singleton	United States	T44	23.58	
6	Christoph Bausch	Switzerland	T44	23.70	PB
7	David Behre	Germany	T43	23.71	
8	Jim Bob Bizzell	United States	T44	28.19	
				Wind: -0.1 m/s	

Q = qualified by place. q = qualified by time. WR = World Record. RR = Regional Record. PB = Personal Best. SB = Seasonal Best.
