= Athletics at the 2012 Summer Paralympics – Men's 100 metres T44 =

Men's 100 metres T44 at the XIV Paralympic Games
- Venue: London Olympic Stadium
- Dates: 5 and 6 September
- Competitors: 20 from 14 nations

Medalists
1st place, gold medalist(s)		Jonnie Peacock	Great Britain
2nd place, silver medalist(s)		Richard Browne	United States
3rd place, bronze medalist(s)		Arnu Fourie	South Africa

Athletics at the 2012 Summer Paralympics
Classification
T/F11–13: Blind and visually impaired
T/F20: Intellectual disability
T/F31–38: Cerebral palsy
F40: Les Autres
T/F42–46: Amputees
T/F51–58: Spinal cord disability
Men T/F42–46
Track
100 m	T42	T44	T46
200 m	T42	T44	T46
400 m	T44	T46
800 m	T46
1500 m	T46
4×100 m relay	T42-46
Road
Marathon	T46
Field
Long jump	F42-44	F46
Triple jump	F46
High jump	F42	F46
Shot put	F42-44	F46
Discus throw	F42	F44
Javelin throw	F42	F44
Women T/F42–46
Track
100 m	T42	T44	T46
200 m	T44	T46
400 m	T46
Field
Long jump	F42-44	F46
Shot put	F42-44
Javelin throw	F46

The Men's 100 metres T44 event at the 2012 Summer Paralympics took place at the London Olympic Stadium on 5 and 6 September.

The T44 category is for athletes who have a single below knee amputation or who can walk with moderately reduced function in one or both legs.

== Records ==
Prior to the competition, the existing World and Paralympic records were as follows.

World record	Jonnie Peacock (GBR)	10.85	Indianapolis, IN, United States	1 July 2012
Paralympic record	Oscar Pistorius (RSA)	11.16	Beijing, China	8 September 2008
Broken records during the 2012 Summer Paralympics
Paralympic record	Jonnie Peacock (GBR)	10.90	London, United Kingdom	6 September 2012

== Results ==
=== Round 1 ===
Competed 5 September 2012 from 19:01. Qual. rule: first 2 in each heat (Q) plus the 2 fastest other times (q) qualified.

==== Heat 1 ====
Rank	Athlete	Country	Time	Notes
1	Jonnie Peacock	Great Britain	11.08	Q, =PR
2	Jerome Singleton	United States	11.46	Q
3	Alan Fonteles Cardoso Oliveira	Brazil	11.56	q
4	Marcio Fernandes	Cape Verde	12.16	
5	David Behre	Germany	12.27	SB
6	Riccardo Scendoni	Italy	12.45	
7	Jia Tianlei	China	12.49	SB
			Wind: -1.6 m/s	

==== Heat 2 ====
Rank	Athlete	Country	Time	Notes
1	Oscar Pistorius	South Africa	11.18	Q, SB
2	Blake Leeper	United States	11.34	Q
3	Liu Zhiming	China	11.84	q, RR
4	Markus Rehm	Germany	11.92	
5	Jean-Baptiste Alaize	France	12.11	
6	Ivan Prokopyev	Russia	12.21	SB
7	Robert Mayer	Austria	12.61	
			Wind: -0.1 m/s	

==== Heat 3 ====
Rank	Athlete	Country	Time	Notes
1	Arnu Fourie	South Africa	11.29	Q
2	Richard Browne	United States	11.33	Q
3	Alister McQueen	Canada	12.02	
4	Christoph Bausch	Switzerland	12.09	
5	Andre Oliveira	Brazil	12.35	SB
6	Jun Haruta	Japan	12.69	
			Wind: -1.0 m/s	

=== Final ===
Competed 6 September 2012 at 21:24.

Rank	Athlete	Country	Time	Notes
1st place, gold medalist(s)	Jonnie Peacock	Great Britain	10.90	PR
2nd place, silver medalist(s)	Richard Browne	United States	11.03	PB
3rd place, bronze medalist(s)	Arnu Fourie	South Africa	11.08	RR
4	Oscar Pistorius	South Africa	11.17	SB
5	Blake Leeper	United States	11.21	
6	Jerome Singleton	United States	11.25	
7	Alan Fonteles Cardoso Oliveira	Brazil	11.33	SB
8	Liu Zhiming	China	11.97	
			Wind: Calm m/s	

Q = qualified by place. q = qualified by time. PR = Paralympic Record. RR = Regional Record. PB = Personal Best. SB = Seasonal Best.
