= Athletics at the 2012 Summer Paralympics – Men's 100 metres T42 =

Men's 100 metres T42 at the XIV Paralympic Games
- Venue: London Olympic Stadium
- Dates: September 7, 2012
- Competitors: 12 from 10 nations

Medalists
1st place, gold medalist(s)		Heinrich Popow	Germany
2nd place, silver medalist(s)		Scott Reardon	Australia
3rd place, bronze medalist(s)		Wojtek Czyz	Germany

Athletics at the 2012 Summer Paralympics
Classification
T/F11–13: Blind and visually impaired
T/F20: Intellectual disability
T/F31–38: Cerebral palsy
F40: Les Autres
T/F42–46: Amputees
T/F51–58: Spinal cord disability
Men T/F42–46
Track
100 m	T42	T44	T46
200 m	T42	T44	T46
400 m	T44	T46
800 m	T46
1500 m	T46
4×100 m relay	T42-46
Road
Marathon	T46
Field
Long jump	F42-44	F46
Triple jump	F46
High jump	F42	F46
Shot put	F42-44	F46
Discus throw	F42	F44
Javelin throw	F42	F44
Women T/F42–46
Track
100 m	T42	T44	T46
200 m	T44	T46
400 m	T46
Field
Long jump	F42-44	F46
Shot put	F42-44
Javelin throw	F46

The Men's 100 metres T42 event at the 2012 Summer Paralympics took place at the London Olympic Stadium on 7 September.

The T42 category is for single above-knee amputees and athletes with other impairments that are comparable to a single above knee amputation, including athletes with loss of muscle power in the lower limbs.

== Records ==
Prior to the competition, the existing World and Paralympic records were as follows.

World record	Earle Connor (CAN)	12.14	Leverkusen, Germany	1 June 2002
Paralympic record	Earle Connor (CAN)	12.32	Beijing, China	14 September 2008

== Results ==
=== Round 1 ===
Competed 7 September 2012 from 10:15. Qual. rule: First 3 in each heat (Q) plus the 2 fastest other times (q) qualified.

==== Heat 1 ====
Rank	Athlete	Country	Time	Notes
1	Heinrich Popow	Germany	12.43	Q, RR
2	Scott Reardon	Australia	12.45	Q, PB
3	Richard Whitehead	Great Britain	12.97	Q, PB
4	Shaquille Vance	United States	13.17	q
5	Helgi Sveinsson	Iceland	15.64	
6	Jamol Allan Pilgrim	Antigua and Barbuda	15.76	SB
			Wind: +0.5 m/s	

==== Heat 2 ====
Rank	Athlete	Country	Time	Notes
1	Wojtek Czyz	Germany	12.53	Q, SB
2	Earle Connor	Canada	12.56	Q
3	Clavel Kayitaré	France	12.59	Q, PB
4	Atsushi Yamamoto	Japan	12.87	q, RR
5	Daniel Jorgensen	Denmark	13.21	PB
6	Garcia-Tolson Rudy	United States	13.77	PB
			Wind: +0.1 m/s	

=== Final ===
Competed 7 September 2012 at 21:25.

Rank	Athlete	Country	Time	Notes
1st place, gold medalist(s)	Heinrich Popow	Germany	12.40	RR
2nd place, silver medalist(s)	Scott Reardon	Australia	12.43	PB
3rd place, bronze medalist(s)	Wojtek Czyz	Germany	12.52	SB
4	Earle Connor	Canada	12.65	
5	Clavel Kayitaré	France	12.73	
6	Atsushi Yamamoto	Japan	12.92	
7	Richard Whitehead	Great Britain	12.99	
8	Shaquille Vance	United States	13.03	SB
			Wind: -0.1 m/s	

Q = qualified by place. q = qualified by time. RR = Regional Record. PB = Personal Best. SB = Seasonal Best.
