= Athletics at the 2012 Summer Paralympics – Women's 400 metres =

The Women's 400m athletics events for the 2012 Summer Paralympics took place at the London Olympic Stadium from August 31 to September 8. A total of 6 events were contested for 6 different classifications.

== Results ==
=== T12 ===
The T12 category is for athletes with visual impairment. Athletes in this category will generally have some residual sight, the ability to recognise the shape of a hand at a distance of 2 metres and the ability to perceive clearly will be no more than 2/60. T12 athletes commonly run with guides.

The event consisted of 4 heats, 2 semifinals and a final. The final results are:

| Rank | Athlete | Country | Class | Time | Notes |
|---|---|---|---|---|---|
| 1st place, gold medalist(s) | Assia El Hannouni | France | T12 | 55.39 | |
| 2nd place, silver medalist(s) | Oxana Boturchuk | Ukraine | T12 | 55.69 | PB |
| 3rd place, bronze medalist(s) | Daniela E. Velasco Maldonado; Guide: Jose Guadalupe Fuentes Ortiz | Mexico | T12 | 58.51 | |
| 4 | Terezinha Guilhermina; Guide: Guilherme Soares de Santana | Brazil | T11 | 1:39.73 | |

=== T13 ===
The T13 category is for athletes with a moderate visual impairment. Athletes in this category have a variety of visual impairments, but can typically recognize contours from a distance of 2 to 6 metres. Athletes in this category do not typically require a guide.

This event consisted of only a single race. Results are the following:

| Rank | Athlete | Country | Time | Notes |
|---|---|---|---|---|
| 1st place, gold medalist(s) | Omara Durand | Cuba | 55.12 | PR |
| 2nd place, silver medalist(s) | Somaya Bousaid | Tunisia | 56.83 | SB |
| 3rd place, bronze medalist(s) | Alexandra Dimoglou | Greece | 56.91 | PB |
| 4 | Nantenin Keita | France | 57.64 | SB |
| 5 | Olena Gliebova | Ukraine | 58.44 | PB |
| 6 | Anna Duzikowska | Poland | 1:03.33 | PB |
| 7 | Viviane Soares | Brazil | 1:05.96 | PB |
| | Joana Helena Silva | Brazil | DNF | |
| | Christine Akullo | Uganda | DNS | |

=== T37 ===
The T37 category is for ambulant athletes with cerebral palsy. These athletes have movement and coordination problems on one half of their body. They have good ability in their dominant side of their body (ie hemiplegia).

The event consisted of 2 heats and a final. The final results are:

| Rank | Athlete | Country | Time | Notes |
|---|---|---|---|---|
| 1st place, gold medalist(s) | Neda Bahi | Tunisia | 1:05.86 | RR |
| 2nd place, silver medalist(s) | Viktoriya Kravchenko | Ukraine | 1:07.32 | RR |
| 3rd place, bronze medalist(s) | Evgeniya Trushnikova | Russia | 1:07.35 | PB |
| 4 | Maryna Snisar | Ukraine | 1:08.86 | |
| 5 | Maike Hausberger | Germany | 1:10.45 | PB |
| 6 | Jodi Elkington | Australia | 1:11.49 | |
| 7 | Isabelle Foerder | Germany | 1:13.47 | |
| 8 | Anastasiya Ovsyannikova | Russia | 1:17.28 | |

=== T46 ===
The T46 category is for athletes who have a single above or below elbow amputation or similar disability, with normal function in both legs.

The event consisted of a single race only. Results are the following:

| Rank | Athlete | Country | Time | Notes |
|---|---|---|---|---|
| 1st place, gold medalist(s) | Yunidis Castillo | Cuba | 55.72 | WR |
| 2nd place, silver medalist(s) | Anrune Liebenberg | South Africa | 56.65 | PB |
| 3rd place, bronze medalist(s) | Alicja Fiodorow | Poland | 58.48 | PB |
| 4 | Wang Yanping | China | 1:01.33 | SB |
| 5 | Alexandra Moguchaya | Russia | 1:02.11 | PB |
| 6 | Yengus Dese Azenaw | Ethiopia | 1:04.93 | PB |
| | Ussumane Cande | Guinea-Bissau | DNS | |

=== T53 ===
The T53 category is for wheelchair athletes with normal use of arms and hands, no or limited trunk function, and no leg function.

The event consisted of a single race only. Results are the following:

| Rank | Athlete | Country | Time | Notes |
|---|---|---|---|---|
| 1st place, gold medalist(s) | Zhou Hongzhuan | China | 55.47 | PB |
| 2nd place, silver medalist(s) | Angela Ballard | Australia | 56.06 | RR |
| 3rd place, bronze medalist(s) | Huang Lisha | China | 56.87 | PB |
| 4 | Shirley Reilly | United States | 57.18 | |
| 5 | Jessica Galli | United States | 57.56 | |
| 6 | Madison de Rozario | Australia | 58.42 | |
| 7 | Anjali Forber Pratt | United States | 59.34 | |
| 8 | Jessica Cooper Lewis | Bermuda | 1:08.88 | |

=== T54 ===
The T54 category is for wheelchair athletes with no leg function, but near full arm function and reasonable to normal trunk function. Typically this may be caused by a lower spinal cord injury or spinal cord birth defect.

The event consisted of 2 heats and a final. The final results are:

| Rank | Athlete | Country | Time | Notes |
|---|---|---|---|---|
| 1st place, gold medalist(s) | Tatyana McFadden | United States | 52.97 | PB |
| 2nd place, silver medalist(s) | Dong Hongjiao | China | 55.43 | RR |
| 3rd place, bronze medalist(s) | Edith Wolf | Switzerland | 56.25 | SB |
| 4 | Zou Lihong | China | 56.57 | |
| 5 | Diane Roy | Canada | 56.60 | |
| 6 | Amanda Kotaja | Finland | 57.35 | PB |
| 7 | Manuela Schaer | Switzerland | 57.57 | |
| 8 | Gunilla Wallengren | Sweden | 58.74 | |
