= Guinea-Bissau at the Paralympics =

- IPC code: GBS
- NPC: Guinea-Bissau Federation of Sports for the Disabled
- Medals: Gold 0 Silver 0 Bronze 0 Total 0

Summer appearances
- 2012; 2016; 2020; 2024

Guinea-Bissau made its Paralympic Games début at the 2012 Summer Paralympics in London, sending two T46 classified athletes to compete in track events.

Guinea-Bissau has never taken part in the Winter Paralympic Games, and no Bissau-Guinean athlete has ever won a Paralympic medal.

== Full results for Guinea-Bissau at the Paralympics ==
Name	Games	Sport	Event	Score	Rank
Cesar Lopes Cardoso	2012 London	Athletics	Men's 400 m T46	55.08	7th in heat 1; did not advance
Ussumane Cande	2012 London	Athletics	Women's 100 m T46	14.87	6th in heat 2; did not advance
Ussumane Cande	2012 London	Athletics	Women's 400 m T46	DNS	DNS in the straight final
Cesar Lopes Cardoso	2016 Rio	Athletics	Men's 100 m T47	DQ	
Mama Saliu Bari	2020 Tokyo	Athletics	Men's 100 m T11	12.48	3rd in heat 4; did not advance
Mama Saliu Bari	2024 Paris	Athletics	Men's 100 m T11	12.69	4th in heat 5; did not advance
Na Brinbamde Domingas	2024 Paris	Athletics	Women's 100 m T11	DQ	

== See also ==
- Guinea-Bissau at the Olympics
