= Disability in Guinea-Bissau =

Disability in Guinea-Bissau refers to the related affairs of people with disability in Guinea-Bissau.

== History ==
Guinea-Bissau ratified the Convention on the Rights of Persons with Disabilities on 24 September 2014.

== Statistics ==
As of 2021, there were 11,584 people of Guinea-Bissau who had varying levels of disability.

== See also ==
- Guinea-Bissau at the Paralympics
