= Athletics at the 2012 Summer Paralympics – Men's 400 metres T46 =

Men's 400 metres T46 at the XIV Paralympic Games
- Venue: London Olympic Stadium
- Dates: 4 September
- Competitors: 13 from 11 nations
- Winning time: 48.45

Medalists
1st place, gold medalist(s)		Gunther Matzinger	Austria
2nd place, silver medalist(s)		Yohansson Nascimento	Brazil
3rd place, bronze medalist(s)		Pradeep Sanjaya Uggl; Dena Pathirannehelag	Sri Lanka

Athletics at the 2012 Summer Paralympics
Classification
T/F11–13: Blind and visually impaired
T/F20: Intellectual disability
T/F31–38: Cerebral palsy
F40: Les Autres
T/F42–46: Amputees
T/F51–58: Spinal cord disability
Men T/F42–46
Track
100 m	T42	T44	T46
200 m	T42	T44	T46
400 m	T44	T46
800 m	T46
1500 m	T46
4×100 m relay	T42-46
Road
Marathon	T46
Field
Long jump	F42-44	F46
Triple jump	F46
High jump	F42	F46
Shot put	F42-44	F46
Discus throw	F42	F44
Javelin throw	F42	F44
Women T/F42–46
Track
100 m	T42	T44	T46
200 m	T44	T46
400 m	T46
Field
Long jump	F42-44	F46
Shot put	F42-44
Javelin throw	F46

The Men's 400 metres T46 event at the 2012 Summer Paralympics took place at the London Olympic Stadium on 4 September.

The T46 category is for athletes who have a single above or below elbow amputation or similar disability, with normal function in both legs.

== Records ==
Prior to the competition, the existing World and Paralympic records were as follows:

World record (T45)	Yohansson Ferreira (BRA)	49.59	19 August 2007	Rio de Janeiro, Brazil
Paralympic record (T45)	?			
World & Paralympic record (T46)	Heath Francis (AUS)	47.69	10 September 2008	Beijing, China
Broken records during the 2012 Summer Paralympics
Paralympic record (T45)	Yohansson Nascimento (BRA)	50.18	4 September 2012	
World record (T45)	Yohansson Nascimento (BRA)	49.21	4 September 2012	

== Results ==
=== Round 1 ===
Competed 4 September 2012 from 10:38. Qual. rule: first 3 in each heat (Q) plus the 2 fastest other times (q) qualified.

==== Heat 1 ====
Rank	Athlete	Country	Class	Time	Notes
1	Gunther Matzinger	Austria	T46	49.91	Q
2	Yohansson Nascimento	Brazil	T45	50.18	Q, PR
3	Antonis Aresti	Cyprus	T46	50.30	Q, SB
4	Xie Hexing	China	T46	50.74	q, SB
5	Samuel Colmenares	Venezuela	T46	51.31	SB
6	Alexey Kotlov	Russia	T46	51.52	
7	Cesar Lopes Cardoso	Guinea-Bissau	T46	55.08	SB

==== Heat 2 ====
Rank	Athlete	Country	Class	Time	Notes
1	Hermas Muvunyi	Rwanda	T46	49.75	Q, RR
2	Pradeep Uggl Dena Pathirannehelag	Sri Lanka	T46	49.82	Q, PB
3	Addoh Kimou	Ivory Coast	T46	50.17	Q, PB
4	Emicarlo Souza	Brazil	T46	50.40	q
5	Tshepo Bhebe	South Africa	T46	52.24	
6	Yao Jianjun	China	T46	54.37	SB

=== Final ===
Competed 4 September 2012 at 20:54.

Rank	Athlete	Country	Class	Time	Notes
1	Gunther Matzinger	Austria	T46	48.45	RR
2	Yohansson Nascimento	Brazil	T45	49.21	WR
3	Pradeep Uggl Dena Pathirannehelag	Sri Lanka	T46	49.28	RR
4	Antonis Aresti	Cyprus	T46	49.59	SB
5	Hermas Muvunyi	Rwanda	T46	49.59	RR
6	Emicarlo Souza	Brazil	T46	50.74	
7	Xie Hexing	China	T46	1:01.80	
8	Addoh Kimou	Ivory Coast	T46	DQ	

Q = qualified by place. q = qualified by time. WR = World Record. PR = Paralympic Record. RR = Regional Record. PB = Personal Best.
