= Orianne Lopez =

French Paralympic athlete

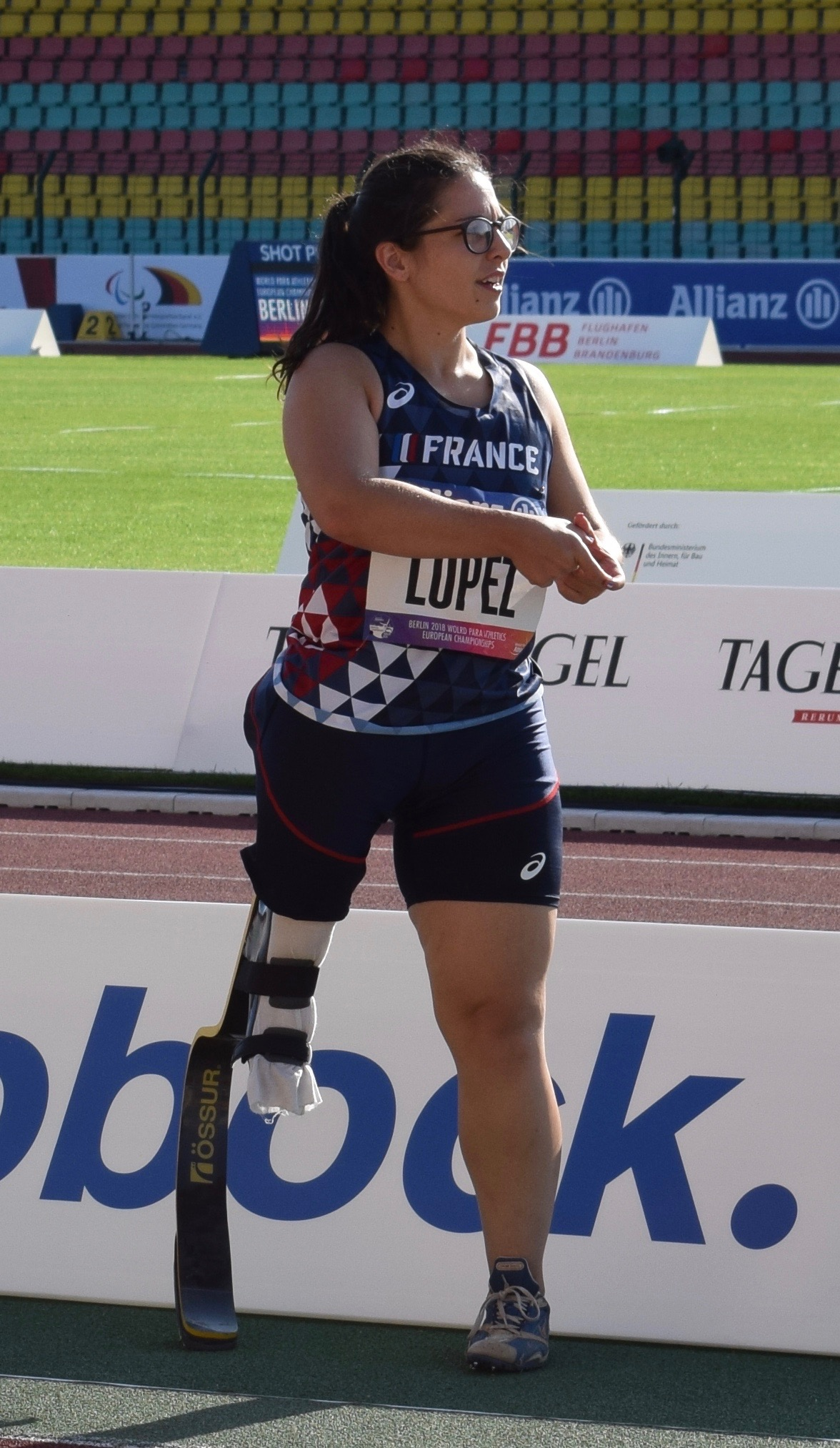
- Lopez at the 2018 World Para Athletics European Championships in Berlin

Personal information
- Born: 20 May 1989 (age 36) Pignan, France
- Home town: Nîmes, France

Sport
- Country: France
- Sport: Paralympic athletics
- Disability: Femoral agenesis
- Disability class: T63

Orianne Lopez (born 20 May 1989) is a French Paralympic athlete who competes in international level events. She competed at the 2012 Summer Paralympics in the women's 100m T42, where she reached the finals but did not win a medal.
