= Judo at the 2012 Summer Paralympics – Men's +100 kg =

Judo competition

Judo – Men's +100 kg at the XIV Paralympic Games
- Venue: ExCeL London
- Date: 1 September 2012
- Competitors: 8 from 8 nations

Medalists
1st place, gold medalist(s)		Kento Masaki	Japan
2nd place, silver medalist(s)		Song Wang	China
3rd place, bronze medalist(s)		Yangaliny Jiménez Domínguez	Cuba
3rd place, bronze medalist(s)		Ilham Zakiyev	Azerbaijan

The men's +100 kg judo competition at the 2012 Summer Paralympics was held on 1 September at ExCeL London.

== Results ==
Quarterfinals
Gábor Papp (HUN)	0000
Wilians Silva (BRA)	0002
Jung-Min Park (KOR)	0000
Song Wang (CHN)	0100
Julien Taurines (FRA)	0000
Tony Walby (CAN)	0100
Gaydar Gaydarov (RUS)	0000
Ilham Zakiyev (AZE)	0100

Semifinals
Wilians Araujo (BRA)	0000
Song Wang (CHN)	0020
Yangaliny Jiménez Domínguez (CUB)	0001
Kento Masaki (JPN)	0011

Final
Song Wang (CHN)	000
Kento Masaki (JPN)	100

=== Repechage ===
Repechage
Hamzeh Nadri (IRI)	100
Jung-Min Park (KOR)	0004
Tony Walby (CAN)	0001
Ilham Zakiyev (AZE)	100

Bronze medal finals
Hamzeh Nadri (IRI)	0003
Yangaliny Jiménez Domínguez (CUB)	0101
Ilham Zakiyev (AZE)	0201
Wilians Silva (BRA)	000
