= Jamol Pilgrim =

Antiguan and Barbudan sprinter (born 1991)

Jamol Allan Pilgrim (born 24 January 1991) is an Antiguan and Barbudan sprinter.

On 22 November 2009, at a time when he was a young sprinter with Olympic aspirations, he was injured in a traffic accident which resulted in his right leg being amputated above the knee. He continued running with a prosthetic, and met the qualifying times for the 2012 Summer Paralympics, running the 100m in 14.62s and the 200m in 33.24s. As a consequence, on 15 March 2012 the Antigua and Barbuda Paralympic Committee was established, specifically so that he could take part in the London Games. He was his country's first and only representative at the London Paralympics, where he took part in the men's 100m T42 sprint. His time of 15.76 was a season's best, but he finished last of his heat, and did not advance to the final.

== See also ==
- Summer Paralympic disability classification
- Antigua and Barbuda at the Paralympics
