= Athletics at the 2018 Commonwealth Games – Men's 100 metres (T47) =

Men's 100 metres (T47) at the 2018 Commonwealth Games
- Venue: Carrara Stadium
- Dates: 13 April
- Competitors: 6 from 6 nations
- Winning time: 11.04

Medalists
gold medal	Suwaibidu Galadima	Nigeria
silver medal	James Arnott	England
bronze medal	Tevaughn Thomas	Jamaica

The men's 100 metres (T47) at the 2018 Commonwealth Games, as part of the athletics programme, took place at Carrara Stadium on 13 April 2018. The event was open to para-sport athletes competing under the T46 / T47 classifications.

== Records ==
Prior to this competition, the existing world record was as follows:

World record	Petrúcio Ferreira (BRA)	10.53 (T46/47)	London, United Kingdom	15 July 2017

== Schedule ==
The schedule was as follows:

Date	Time	Round
Friday 13 April 2018	19:52	Final

All times are Australian Eastern Standard Time (UTC+10)

== Results ==
With six entrants, the event was held as a straight final.

== Final ==
Rank	Lane	Name	Sport Class	Reaction Time	Result	Notes
1st place, gold medalist(s)	3	Suwaibidu Galadima (NGR)	T47	0.150	11.04	
2nd place, silver medalist(s)	4	James Arnott (ENG)	T46	0.148	11.30	
3rd place, bronze medalist(s)	6	Tevaughn Thomas (JAM)	T46	0.173	11.63	
4	7	Morgan Jones (WAL)	T47	0.165	11.93	
5	2	Stephen Wesonga (KEN)	T47	0.180	12.47	
6	5	Samuel Nason (PNG)	T47	0.188	12.75	
					Wind: -0.1 m/s	
