= Antigua and Barbuda at the 2012 Summer Paralympics =

- IPC code: ANT
- NPC: Antigua and Barbuda Paralympic Committee

in London
- Competitors: 1 in 1 sport
- Flag bearer: Jamol Pilgrim
- Medals: Gold 0 Silver 0 Bronze 0 Total 0

Summer Paralympics appearances (overview)
- 2012; 2016–2024

Antigua and Barbuda made its Paralympic Games debut at the 2012 Summer Paralympics in London, United Kingdom, from August 29 to September 9, 2012.

The Antigua and Barbuda Paralympic Committee (ABPC) was established on 15 March 2012. Its immediate purpose was to enable "the nation’s only Paralympic athlete", Jamol Pilgrim, to compete at the 2012 Games, as this required his country having a National Paralympic Committee. Pilgrim had been a sprinter with Olympic aspirations until a car crash in 2009 resulted in his right leg being amputated above the knee. Running with a prosthetic, he met the ‘A’ standard qualifying time in 2011 to compete in London. He took part in the men's 100m T42 sprint. Pilgrim was Antigua and Barbuda's only representative at the London Games, though the newly formed ABPC also took an interest in twelve-year-old equestrian rider and right leg amputee Spadicia Harris.

== Athletics ==
In his only event, the men's 100m T42, Pilgrim ran his heat in 15.76, finishing sixth and last.

Men's track

Athlete	Event	Heat		Final	
Athlete	Event	Result	Rank	Result	Rank
Jamol Pilgrim	100m T42	15.76	6	did not advance	

== See also ==
- Antigua and Barbuda at the Paralympics
- Antigua and Barbuda at the 2012 Summer Olympics
