= Yangaliny Jiménez Domínguez =

Cuban Paralympic judoka

Personal information
- Born: 2 March 1979 (age 47)

Sport
- Country: Cuba
- Sport: Paralympic judo
Medal record
Paralympic Games
Bronze medal – third place	2012 London	+100 kg
Bronze medal – third place	2016 Rio de Janeiro	+100 kg
Parapan American Games
Gold medal – first place	2011 Guadalajara	+100 kg
Gold medal – first place	2015 Toronto	+100 kg

Yangaliny Jiménez Domínguez (born 2 March 1979) is a Cuban Paralympic judoka. He represented Cuba at the 2012 Summer Paralympics in London, United Kingdom and at the 2016 Summer Paralympics in Rio de Janeiro, Brazil. He won two medals: the bronze medal in the men's +100 kg event in 2012 and the bronze medal in the men's +100 kg event in 2016.

He also competed at the Parapan American Games winning the gold medal both in 2011 and in 2015 in the men's +100 kg event.
