= Guinea-Bissau at the 2024 Summer Paralympics =

- IPC code: GBS

in Paris, France August 28, 2024 – September 8, 2024
- Competitors: 2 (1 man and 1 woman) in 1 sport
- Flag bearer: Volunteer
- Medals: Gold 0 Silver 0 Bronze 0 Total 0

Summer Paralympics appearances (overview)
- 2012; 2016; 2020; 2024

Guinea-Bissau competed at the 2024 Summer Paralympics in Paris, France, from 28 August to 8 September 2024. This was the nation's fourth time competing at the Summer Paralympic Games after it made its debut at the 2012 Summer Paralympics. The delegation consisted of two competitors from one sport.

== Competitors ==
The following is the list of number of competitors in the Games.

| Sport | Men | Women | Total |
|---|---|---|---|
| Athletics | 1 | 1 | 2 |
| Total | 1 | 1 | 2 |

== Athletics ==
| Athlete | Event | Heat | | Final | |
| Athlete | Event | Result | Rank | Result | Rank |
|---|---|---|---|---|---|
| Mama Saliu Bari | Men's 100 metres T11 | 12.69 SB | 4 | Did not advance | |
| Na Brinbamde Domingas | Women's 100 metres T11 | DQ | | Did not advance | |

== See also ==
- Guinea-Bissau at the 2024 Summer Olympics
- Guinea-Bissau at the Paralympics
