= Jaydon Page =

Australian Paralympic athlete

Personal information
- Full name: Jaydon Lewis Page
- Nationality: Australian
- Born: 23 December 2004 (age 21) Canberra
- Height: 186 cm (6 ft 1 in)
- Weight: 74 kg (163 lb)

Sport
- Disability class: T47
- Coached by: Sebastian Kuzminski
Medal record
CommonwealthGames
Silver medal – second place	2022 Birmingham	Men's 100 m T47

Jaydon Page (born 23 December 2004) is an Australian Paralympic athlete. He represented Australia at the 2020 Summer Paralympics.

Page lives in Canberra, Australian Capital Territory and attended St Francis Xavier College.

== Athletics ==
Page is classified as T47 athlete. He finished fifth in his heat the Men's 100m T47 at the 2020 Tokyo Paralympics.

At the 2022 Commonwealth Games in Birmingham, he won the silver medal in the Men's 100 m T47. Page finished 5th place in the 2023 World Para Athletics Championships.

In the lead up the 2024 Paralympics, he finished seventh Men's 100m T47 at the 2024 World Para Athletics Championships, in Kobe, Japan. At the 2025 World Para Athletics Championships in New Delhi, he competed in the 100m T47 and was ranked 9th in heats and did not qualify for the final.

In 2021, his coach is Sebastian Kuzminski.
