= Guinea-Bissau at the 2020 Summer Paralympics =

- Flag of Guinea-Bissau
- IPC code: GBS

in Tokyo, Japan August 24, 2021 – September 5, 2021
- Competitors: 1 (1 man and 0 women) in 1 sport and 1 event
- Flag bearer: Mama Saliu Bari
- Medals: Gold 0 Silver 0 Bronze 0 Total 0

Summer Paralympics appearances (overview)
- 2012; 2016; 2020; 2024

Guinea-Bissau participated in the 2020 Summer Paralympics in Tokyo, Japan, from 24 August to 5 September 2021. This was their third consecutive appearance at the Summer Paralympics since 2012.

== Competitors ==
The following is the list of number of competitors participating in the Games:

Sport	Men	Women	Total
Athletics	1	0	1
Total	1	0	1

== Athletics ==
Men's track

Athlete	Event	Heats		Final	
Athlete	Event	Result	Rank	Result	Rank
Mama Saliu Bari	100 m T11	12.48 PB	3	Did not advance	

== See also ==
- Guinea-Bissau at the Paralympics
- Guinea-Bissau at the 2020 Summer Olympics
