= Cuba at the 2012 Summer Paralympics =

- IPC code: CUB
- NPC: Comité Paralimpico Cubano

in London
- Competitors: 23 in 6 sports
- Flag bearer: Omara Durand
- Medals Ranked 15th: Gold 9 Silver 5 Bronze 3 Total 17

Summer Paralympics appearances (overview)
- 1992; 1996; 2000; 2004; 2008; 2012; 2016; 2020; 2024

Cuba competed at the 2012 Summer Paralympics in London, United Kingdom from August 29 to September 9, 2012.

== Medallists ==
Medal	Name	Sport	Event	Date
Gold	Dalidaivis Rodriguez Clark	Judo	Women's -63kg	31 August
Gold	Luis Felipe Gutierrez	Athletics	Men's long jump F13	1 September
Gold	Yunidis Castillo	Athletics	Women's 200m T46	1 September
Gold	Jorge Hierrezuelo Marcillis	Judo	Men's -90kg	1 September
Gold	Omara Durand	Athletics	Women's 400m T13	3 September
Gold	Leonardo Diaz	Athletics	Men's Discus Throw F54-56	5 September
Gold	Yunidis Castillo	Athletics	Women's 100m T46	5 September
Gold	Omara Durand	Athletics	Women's 100m T13	6 September
Gold	Yunidis Castillo	Athletics	Women's 400m T46	8 September
Silver	Angel Jimenez Cabeza	Athletics	Men's long jump F13	1 September
Silver	Luis Felipe Gutierrez	Athletics	Men's 100m T13	1 September
Silver	Raciel Gonzalez Isidoria	Athletics	Men's 200m T46	2 September
Silver	Lorenzo Perez Escalona	Swimming	Men's 50m Freestyle S6	4 September
Silver	Raciel Gonzalez Isidoria	Athletics	Men's 100m T46	6 September
Bronze	Isao Cruz Alonso	Judo	Men's -81kg	31 August
Bronze	Yangaliny Jimenez Dominguez	Judo	Men's +100kg	1 September
Bronze	Lorenzo Perez Escalona	Swimming	Men's 100m Freestyle S6	8 September

== Athletics ==
Men's Track and Road Events

Athlete	Event	Heat		Semifinal		Final	
Athlete	Event	Result	Rank	Result	Rank	Result	Rank
Luis Felipe Gutierrez	100m T13	10.94	2	—		11.02	2nd place, silver medalist(s)
Luis Felipe Gutierrez	200m T13	22.35	2 Q	—		22.24	5
Raciel Gonzalez Isidoria	100m T46	10.97	2 Q	—		11.08	2nd place, silver medalist(s)
Raciel Gonzalez Isidoria	200m T46	22.09	1 Q	—		22.15	2nd place, silver medalist(s)
Arian Iznaga	200m T11	23.77	3 q	DNS		Did not advance	
Arian Iznaga	400m T11	53.95	2	—		Did not advance	
Miguel Bartelemy Sablon	400m T13	DSQ		—		Did not advance	
Miguel Bartelemy Sablon	800m T13	2:02.11	5	—		Did not advance	
Lazaro Rashid	800m T12	1:56.64	2 q	—		1:58.76	4
Lazaro Rashid	1500m T13	4:10.80	9	—		Did not advance	

Men's Field Events

Athlete	Event	Final	
Athlete	Event	Distance	Rank
Luis Felipe Gutierrez	Long Jump F13	7.54 PR	1st place, gold medalist(s)
Angel Jimenez Cabeza	Long Jump F13	7.14	2nd place, silver medalist(s)
Leonardo Diaz	Shot Put F54-56	9.85 (713 pts)	18
Leonardo Diaz	Discus Throw F54-56	44.63 (1019 pts)	1st place, gold medalist(s)
Leonardo Diaz	Javelin Throw F54-56	29.92	10
Jorge Delgado	Javelin Throw F12-13	51.15	10

Women's Track and Road Events

Athlete	Event	Heat		Semifinal		Final	
Athlete	Event	Result	Rank	Result	Rank	Result	Rank
Daineris Mijan	100m T12	12.79	2 q	12.91	3	Did not advance	
Omara Durand	100m T13	12.10	1 Q	—		12.00	1st place, gold medalist(s)
Omara Durand	400m T13	—				55.12	1st place, gold medalist(s)
Yunidis Castillo	100m T46	11.95	1 Q	—		12.01	1st place, gold medalist(s)
Yunidis Castillo	200m T46	24.81	1 Q	—		24.45	1st place, gold medalist(s)
Yunidis Castillo	400m T46	—				55.72	1st place, gold medalist(s)

== Cycling ==
=== Road ===
Men

Athlete	Event	Time	Rank
Damian Lopez Alfonso	Road Race C4-5	1:59:33	12
Damian Lopez Alfonso	Time Trial C4	38:08.77	13

=== Track ===
Time Trial

Athlete	Event	Time	Rank
Damian Lopez Alfonso	Men's 1km Time Trial C4-5	1:16.485	21

Individual Pursuit

Athlete	Event	Heats		Final	
Athlete	Event	Time	Rank	Time	Rank
Damian Lopez Alfonso	Men's Individual Pursuit C4	5:21.172	12	Did not advance	

== Judo ==
Athlete	Event	Round of 16	Quarterfinals	Semifinals	First Repechage Round	Repechage Semifinals	Final	
Athlete	Event	Opposition Result	Opposition Result	Opposition Result	Opposition Result	Opposition Result	Opposition Result	Rank
Isao Cruz Alonso	Men's -81kg	Safarov (AZE); W 0201–0000	Kosinov (UKR); L 0020–0102	Did not advance	BYE	Powell (GBR); W 1000–0000	Cortijo (ESP); W 0102–0013	3rd place, bronze medalist(s)
Jorge Hierrezuelo Marcillis	Men's -90kg	Pominov (UKR); W 1010–0001	Dashtseren (MGL); W 1000–0000	Kretsul (RUS); W 1000–0000	—		Ingram (GBR); W 0010–0000	1st place, gold medalist(s)
Juan Cortada Bermudez	Men's -100kg	Kitazono (JPN); L 0011–1000	Did not advance					
Yangaliny Jimenez Dominguez	Men's +100kg	BYE	Walby (CAN); W 1010–0001	Masaki (JPN); L 0011–0112	BYE		Nadri (IRI); W 0101–0003	3rd place, bronze medalist(s)
Dalidaivis Rodriguez Clark	Women's -63kg	—	Soazo (VEN); W 1101–0101	Payno (ESP); W 1000–0100	—		Zhou (CHN); W 1000–0000	1st place, gold medalist(s)

== Powerlifting ==
Men

Athlete	Event	Result	Rank
Cesar Rubio Guerra	-52kg	143	9
Luis Perea Polo	-67.5kg	160	8

== Shooting ==
Athlete	Event	Qualification		Final	
Athlete	Event	Score	Rank	Score	Rank
Marino Heredia	Men's 10m Air Pistol SH1	556	17	Did not advance	
Marino Heredia	Mixed 50m Pistol SH1	493	26	Did not advance	

== Swimming ==
Men

Athletes	Event	Heat		Final	
Athletes	Event	Time	Rank	Time	Rank
Lorenzo Perez Escalona	50m freestyle S6	29.98	1 Q	30.04	2nd place, silver medalist(s)
Lorenzo Perez Escalona	100m freestyle S6	1:10.64	3 Q	1:08.01	3rd place, bronze medalist(s)
Lorenzo Perez Escalona	400m freestyle S6	5:48.86	10	Did not advance	
Yunerki Ortega	50m freestyle S11	28.34	12	Did not advance	
Yunerki Ortega	100m backstroke S11	1:23.32	14	Did not advance	
Yunerki Ortega	100m breaststroke SB11	1:21.52	7 Q	1:22.26	8
Yunerki Ortega	100m butterfly S11	1:15.42	11	Did not advance	
Yunerki Ortega	200m individual medley SM11	2:45.64	11	Did not advance	

== See also ==
- Cuba at the 2012 Summer Olympics
