= Suwaibidu Galadima =

Nigerian Paralympic athlete (born 1992)

Personal information
- Nationality: Nigerian
- Born: 31 August 1992 (age 33) Kagoro, Kaduna State

Sport
- Country: Nigeria
- Sport: Athletics
- Event: 100 metres

Achievements and titles
- Personal best: 100 m: 10.18
Medal record
Representing Nigeria
Men's athletics
Commonwealth Games
Gold medal – first place	2018 Gold Coast	100 m (T47)

Suwaibidu Galadima (born 31 August 1992) is a Nigerian male disability track and field athlete who competes in the 100 metres in the T46 category. His right arm is amputated below the elbow. He was the gold medallist in the T47 category at the 2018 Commonwealth Games.

He won a sprint double in the 100 m and 200 metres at the 2011 All-Africa Games. He represented his country in both events at the 2012 Summer Paralympics and placed fourth in the 100 m.

== International competitions ==
Year	Competition	Venue	Position	Event	Notes
2011	All-Africa Games	Maputo, Mozambique	1st	100 m (T46)	10.81
2011	All-Africa Games	Maputo, Mozambique	1st	200 m (T46)	22.36
2012	Paralympic Games	London, United Kingdom	4th	100 m (T46)	11.31
2012	Paralympic Games	London, United Kingdom	3rd (h)	200 m (T46)	22.98
2018	Commonwealth Games	Gold Coast, Australia	1st	100 m (T47)	11.04
