= Matthew Silcocks =

Australian athletics competitor (born 1993)

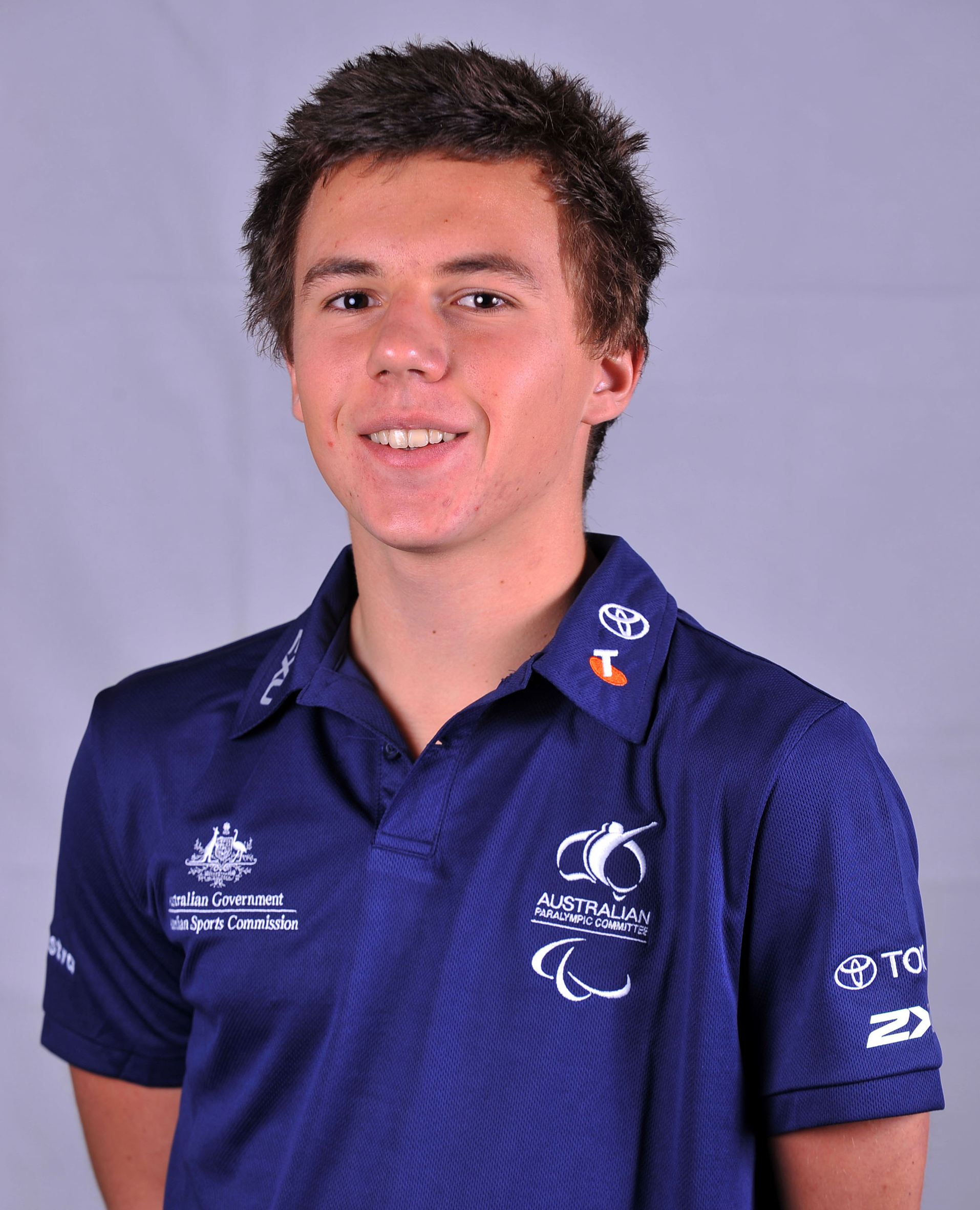
- 2012 Australian Paralympic team portrait of Silcocks

Personal information
- Nationality: Australian
- Born: Mathew Silcocks; 5 May 1993 (age 33)

Sport
- Country: Australia
- Sport: Paralympic athletics
- Club: Knox Athletics Club
- Team: Straya

Matthew Silcocks (born 5 May 1993) is an Australian athletics competitor. He was selected to represent Australia at the 2012 Summer Paralympics in athletics. He finished sixth in the 1500m, in a time of 3:59.79.

== Personal ==
Silcocks was born on 5 May 1993, and is from Melbourne's southeastern suburb of Mount Waverley, Victoria. He has Poland's syndrome, a syndrome he had at birth, that caused development problems with his left arm. As of 2012, he was working on a degree in Science and Arts.

== Athletics ==
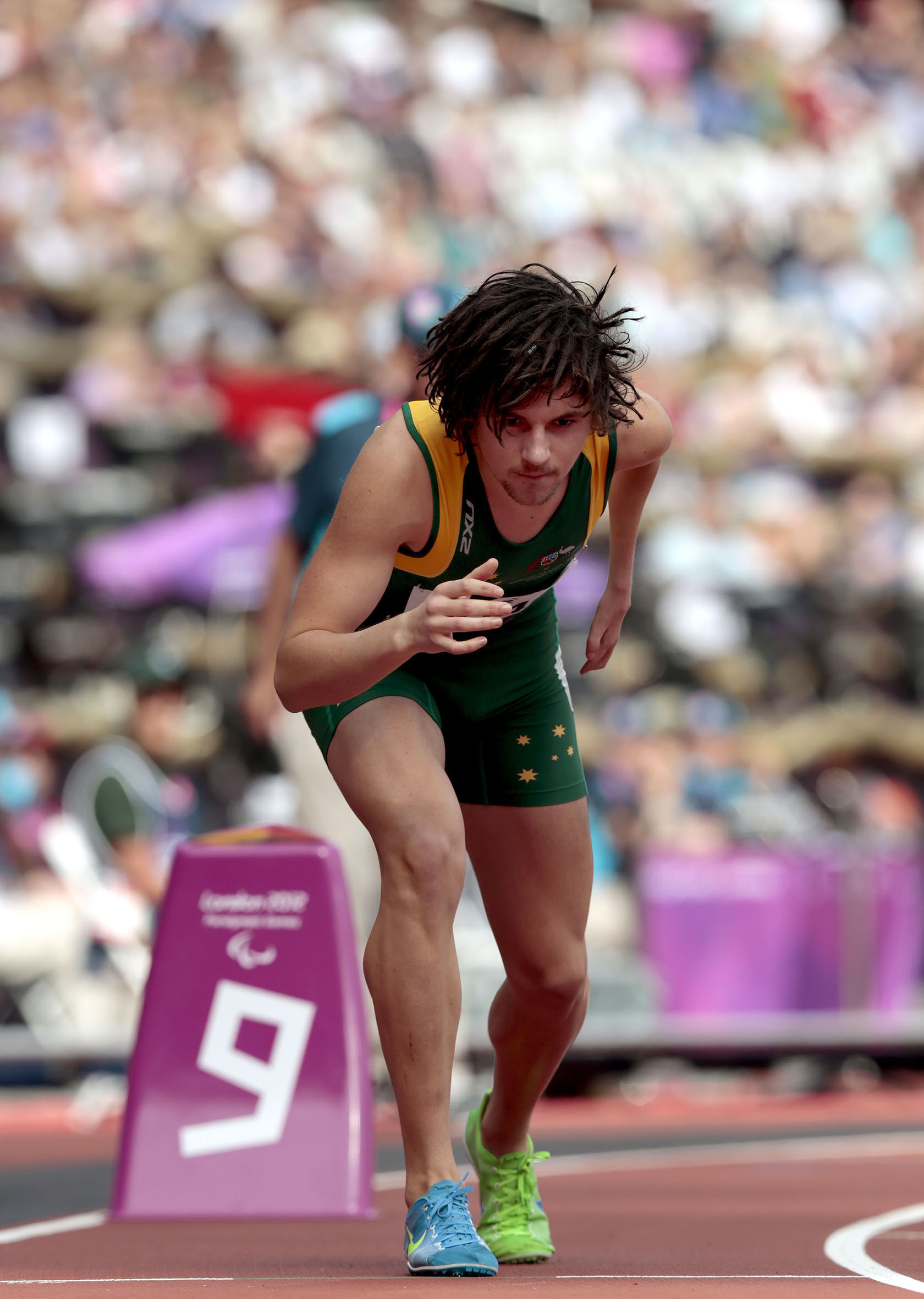
Silcocks at the 2012 London Paralympics

Silcocks competes in the T46 classification in the 800 metres and 1500 metres events. He is a member of the Knox Athletics Club and is coached by Richard Huggins. As of 2012, he has a scholarship with the Victorian Institute of Sport.

Silcocks started competing in athletics in 2009. At the 2009 Australian AWD Underage Championships, he earned two gold medals. At the 2010 Australian AWD Underage Championships, he earned three gold medals. He first represented Australia in 2011. At the 2011 Australian Athletics Championships, he finished first in the 1500 metre event. At the 2011 Arafura Games, he finished first in the men' 400m ambulant event with a time of 53.69 seconds. In the heat number two, two days before, he qualified third with a time of 55.80 seconds. He also finished first in the 800 metres event with a time of 2:02.95. He notched another first place win in the Men 1500m Ambulant event with a time of 4:20.87. He also competed in the 200 metre event. At the 2012 Australian athletics championships, he finished first in the men's 800m ambulant even with a time of 1:59.22 and finished first in the men's 1500m ambulant with a time of 4:05.13. He was selected to represent Australia at the 2012 Summer Paralympics in athletics. He did not medal at the 2012 Games.
