= Ola Abidogun =

British Paralympic athlete

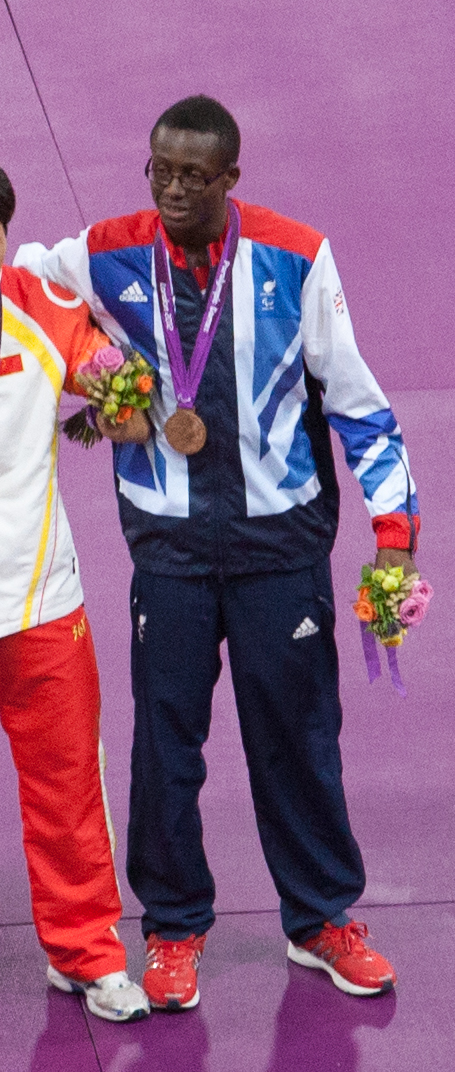
- Abidogun at the 2012 Summer Paralympics

Personal information
- Nationality: British
- Born: 3 August 1993 (age 33) Ilford, London, England

Sport
- Country: Great Britain; England
- Sport: T46 athletics
- Events: 100m and 200m
- Club: Horwich RMI Athletics Club
Medal record
Men's athletics
Representing Great Britain
Paralympic Games
Bronze medal – third place	2012 London	100m T46
IPC European Championships
Silver medal – second place	2014 Swansea	100m – T47
- Updated on 29 August 2914

Ola Abidogun (born 3 August 1993) is a British athlete who competes in T46 sprinting events. He competed for England at the 2010 Commonwealth Games, and was part of the British team at the 2012 Summer Paralympics where he took bronze in the 100m sprint. He has won multiple medals at the junior level and as a senior won a silver in the 2014 European Championships.

== Early life ==
Abidogun was born in Ilford, London.

== Career ==
In 2008 he began competing at the DSE Junior Championships. He competed at the 2010 IWAS World Junior Championships in Olomouc, Czech Republic, where he won the gold medal in the 100m event of his disability sport classification, and the silver medal in the 200m competition. He was chosen for the English team at the 2010 Commonwealth Games. In his T46 100m heat he ran a time of 11.37, and then 11.32 in the semi-final, both of which were personal bests. He placed fifth in the final.

Abidogun wasn't selected for the British team at the 2011 IPC Athletics World Championships, but instead was selected for the 2011 IWAS World Junior Championships and won the same medals as he had in the previous year.

In adult competition, he won silver in the 100m and gold in the 200m at the Paralympic World Cup in May. It had been his début at a World Cup event, and Channel 4 would later describe his performance as announcing "himself as a new GB sprint star". He finished 2011 ranked eighth in the world in the 100m and tenth in the 200m. He was selected for the British team for the 2012 Summer Paralympics in London, to compete in both the T46 100m and 200m.

Abidogun made his debut at the 2012 Summer Paralympics by qualifying for the final of the T46 men's 100m, finishing first in his heat with a time of 11:21secs. He won a bronze medal in the final.

At the IPC Athletics World Championships in Lyon in 2013, Abidogun competed in both the T47 100m and 200m. He finished 5th in the 100m and 7th in the 200m in France.

Abidogun competed at the IPC Athletics European Championships in Swansea in 2014. He won the European silver medal in the T47 100m in a time of 11.38. He had to settle for 4th place in the 200m as he was just edged out of a spot on the podium once more.

In June 2022, he was named in the 72-member squad selected to represent England in athletics at the 2022 Commonwealth Games in Birmingham. He will compete in the T47 100m.

== Personal life ==
Abidogun is a single arm amputee. Abidogun is currently studying law at Nottingham Trent University. His parents Pastors Kenny and Kemi run Christ the Vine Church based in the Manchester Area which he regularly attends.
