= Yengus Azenaw =

Ethiopian female para athlete

Personal information
- Full name: Yengus Dese Azenaw
- Born: 4 July 1992 (age 33)
- Height: 1.45 m (4 ft 9 in)
- Weight: 45 kg (99 lb; 7 st 1 lb)

Sport
- Sport: Para Athletics
- Disability class: T47
- Club: Tigray Regional State Paralympic Sports Association
- Coached by: Nigatu Habtemariam

Yengus Dese Azenaw (born 4 July 1992) is an Ethiopian female para athlete. She represented Ethiopia at the 2012 as well as in the 2016 Summer Paralympics. SHe took part in the 100m, 200m and 400m events. Yengus Azenaw was motivated to be a professional para athlete by her primary school teacher.
