= Yohansson Nascimento =

Brazilian Paralympic athlete (born 1987)

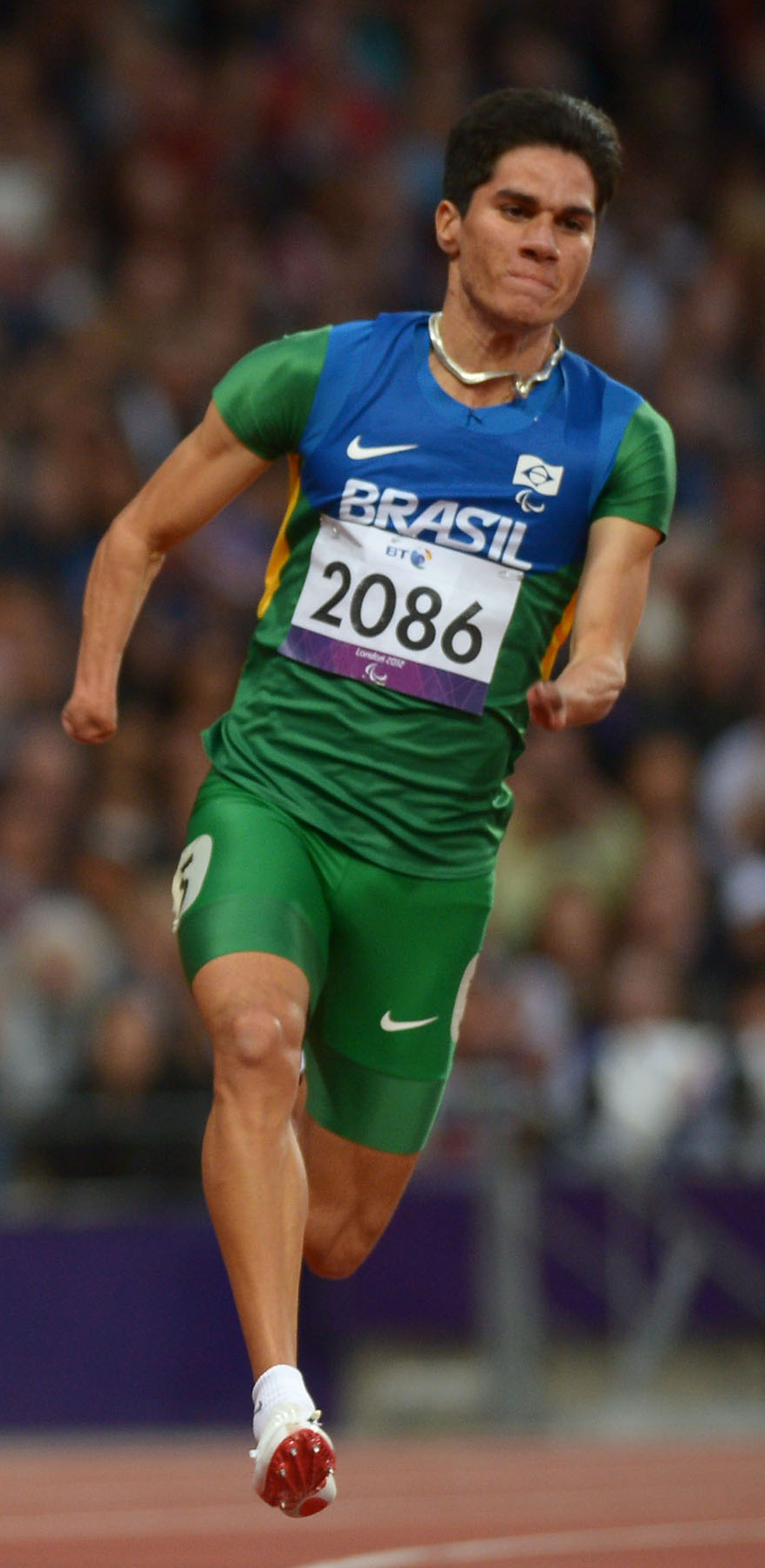
- Nascimento at the 2012 Summer Paralympics

Personal information
- Born: 25 September 1987 (age 38) Maceió, Brazil

Sport
- Country: Brazil
- Sport: Para athletics
- Disability class: T46
- Coached by: Amaury Verissimo (national)

Achievements and titles
- Paralympic finals: 2012 London
Medal record
Men's para athletics
Representing Brazil
Paralympic Games
Gold medal – first place	2012 London	200 m T46
Silver medal – second place	2008 Beijing	4 × 100 m T42–46
Silver medal – second place	2012 London	400 m T46
Silver medal – second place	2016 Rio de Janeiro	4 × 100 m – T42–47
Bronze medal – third place	2008 Beijing	100 m T46
IPC World Championships
Gold medal – first place	2011 Christchurch	100 m T46
Gold medal – first place	2013 Lyon	200 m T46
Gold medal – first place	2015 Doha	200 m T47
Silver medal – second place	2011 Christchurch	200 m T46
Silver medal – second place	2013 Lyon	4 × 100 m T42–46
Silver medal – second place	2015 Doha	100 m T47
Silver medal – second place	2017 London	100 m T47
Bronze medal – third place	2011 Christchurch	4 × 100 m T42–46
Bronze medal – third place	2013 Lyon	100 m T46
Parapan American Games
Gold medal – first place	2007 Rio de Janeiro	100 m T46
Gold medal – first place	2007 Rio de Janeiro	200 m T46
Gold medal – first place	2007 Rio de Janeiro	400 m T46
Gold medal – first place	2011 Guadalajara	100 m T46
Gold medal – first place	2011 Guadalajara	200 m T46
Silver medal – second place	2015 Toronto	200 m T47
Silver medal – second place	2019 Lima	100 m T47
Bronze medal – third place	2015 Toronto	100 m T47

Yohansson Nascimento (born 25 September 1987) is an athlete and Paralympian from Brazil competing mainly in T45/46 sprint events. He was born without both his hands, and is classified T46. He started athletics in 2005.

== Personal history ==
Nasciemento resides in Maceió and is married to Talita. He was named after former Formula One driver Stefan Johansson.

== Athletics career ==
Nascimento competed in the 2008 Summer Paralympics in Beijing, China. There, he won a silver medal in the men's 4 x 100 metre relay – T42–46 event, a bronze medal in the men's 100 metres – T46 event, finished fifth in the men's 200 metres – T46 event and went out in the first round of the men's 400 metres – T46 event.

At the 2012 Summer Paralympics, he won a gold medal in the men's 200 metres T46 event, breaking the T45 world record twice in the process. He won a silver medal in the T46 400m event, also in T45 world record time. He set a third T45 world record in his 100m heat but in the final he pulled up injured and fell to the track. His determination to cross the finish line regardless was selected Number 9 in the IPC's Top 50 Paralympic Moments of 2012.
