= Yunidis Castillo =

Cuban Paralympic athlete (born 1987)

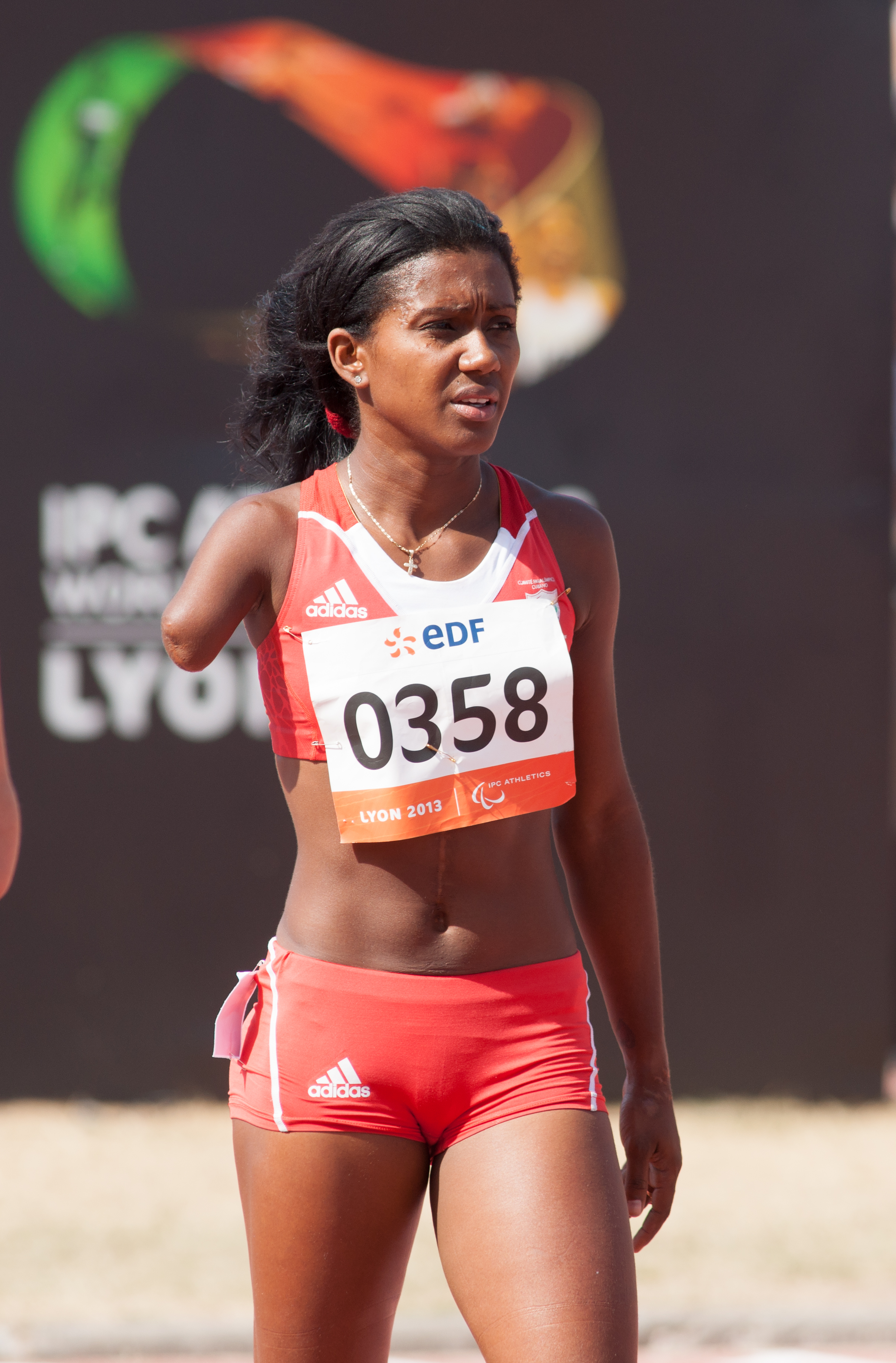
- Yunidis at the 2013 IPC Athletics World Championships in Lyon, France.

Personal information
- Nickname: The Bullet

Sport
- Country: Cuba
- Sport: Running
Medal record
Women's athletics
Representing Cuba
Paralympic Games
Gold medal – first place	2008 Beijing	100m - T46
Gold medal – first place	2008 Beijing	200m - T46
Gold medal – first place	2012 London	100m - T46
Gold medal – first place	2012 London	200m - T46
Gold medal – first place	2012 London	400m - T46
Silver medal – second place	2016 Rio de Janeiro	Long jump - T47
IPC World Championships
Gold medal – first place	2011 Christchurch	100m - T46
Gold medal – first place	2011 Christchurch	200m - T46
Gold medal – first place	2011 Christchurch	400m - T46
Gold medal – first place	2013 Lyon	100m - T46
Gold medal – first place	2013 Lyon	200m - T46
Gold medal – first place	2013 Lyon	400m - T46
Gold medal – first place	2015 Doha	200m - T47
Silver medal – second place	2015 Doha	Long jump F47
Silver medal – second place	2015 Doha	400m - T47
Parapan American Games
Gold medal – first place	2007 Rio de Janeiro	100m - T46
Gold medal – first place	2007 Rio de Janeiro	200m - T46
Gold medal – first place	2011 Guadalajara	100m - T46
Gold medal – first place	2015 Toronto	100m - T47
Gold medal – first place	2015 Toronto	200m - T47
- Updated on 22 March 2021

Yunidis Castillo (born 6 June 1987) is a Paralympic athlete from Cuba competing mainly in category T46 sprint events.

She competed in the 2004 Summer Paralympics in Athens, Greece. There she finished thirteenth in the women's Long jump - F44-46 event. She also competed at the 2008 Summer Paralympics in Beijing, China. There she won a gold medal in the women's 100 metres - T46 event and a gold medal in the women's 200 metres - T46 event.

At the 2012 Summer Paralympics in London, she won gold medal in the women's 100 metres, 200 metres and 400 metres T46 events setting new world record in all of them.

She lost her right arm in a car accident at the age of 10.
