= Wang Yanping =

Chinese Paralympic athlete (born 1993)

Personal information
- Nationality: Chinese
- Born: November 22, 1993 (age 32) Baoshan, China
- Height: 168 cm (66 in)

Sport
- Sport: Athletics
- Disability class: F47
- Event(s): sprint, long jump
- Club: Yunnan province
- Coached by: Hu Zhengguan (national)
Medal record
Paralympic athletics
Representing China
Paralympic Games
Bronze medal – third place	2012 London	100 m T46
IPC Athletics World Championships
Silver medal – second place	2015 Doha	100 m T47
Asian Para Games
Gold medal – first place	2010 Guangzhou	100 m T46
Gold medal – first place	2010 Guangzhou	200 m T46
Gold medal – first place	2014 Incheon	100 m T47
Gold medal – first place	2014 Incheon	200 m T44/T47
Gold medal – first place	2014 Incheon	Long jump T47
Gold medal – first place	2018 Jakarta	400 m T45/46/47
Silver medal – second place	2018 Jakarta	100 m T45/46/47
Silver medal – second place	2018 Jakarta	200 m T45/46/47

Wang Yanping (born 22 November 1993) is a Paralympic athlete from China who competes in throwing events for F37 classification athletes.

== Athletic career ==
Wang became involved in sport in 2005. Her first major international games was the 2011 IPC Athletics World Championships in Christchurch. She entered the 100m, 200m and 400m sprints, her best result being fourth place in the 400 m race. A year later she competed at the 2012 Summer Paralympics in London where she won bronze in the 100m T46 sprint. As well as her Paralympic success, Wang has won medals at the 2015 World Championships in Doha, with a bronze in the 100m T47, and a dominant display in the 2014 Asian Para Games where she took gold in all three events entered: 100m, 200m and long jump.

== Personal career ==
Wang was born in Baoshan, China in 1993. An accident at the age of three resulted in her right hand being amputated.
