= Athletics at the 2012 Summer Paralympics – Men's 200 metres =

The Men's 200m athletics events for the 2012 Summer Paralympics took place at the London Olympic Stadium from August 31 to September 8. A total of 13 events were contested over this distance for 13 different classifications.

== Schedule ==
R	Round 1	½	Semifinals	F	Final

Event↓/Date →	Fri 31		Sat 1		Sun 2		Mon 3	Tue 4		Wed 5	Thr 6		Fri 7		Sat 8	
T11 200m							R	½	F							
T12 200m													R	½	F	
T13 200m											R	½	F			
T34 200m								R	F							
T35 200m											R	F				
T36 200m											R	F				
T37 200m	R	F														
T38 200m													R		F	
T42 200m			R	F												
T44 200m			R		F											
T46 200m			R		½	F										
T52 200m															R	F
T53 200m													R	F		

== Results ==
=== T11 ===
The T11 category is for athletes with a visual impairment. A T11 athlete may be entirely without sight, or be able to perceive light, but have no ability to see the shape of a hand at any distance. T11 athletes commonly run with guides.

Final

Rank	Athlete	Country	Time	Notes
1st place, gold medalist(s)	Felipe Gomes; Guide: Leonardo Souza Lopes	Brazil	22.97	=PB
2nd place, silver medalist(s)	Daniel Silva; Guide: Heitor de Oliveira Sales	Brazil	22.99	
3rd place, bronze medalist(s)	José Sayovo Armando; Guide: Nicolau Palanca	Angola	23.10	
4	Lucas Prado; Guide: Justino Barbosa dos Santos	Brazil	23.15	
			Wind: -0.3 m/s	

=== T12 ===
The T12 category is for athletes with visual impairment. Athletes in this category will generally have some residual sight, the ability to recognise the shape of a hand at a distance of 2 metres and the ability to perceive clearly will be no more than 2/60. T12 athletes commonly run with guides.

Final

Rank	Athlete	Country	Time	Notes
1st place, gold medalist(s)	Mateusz Michalski	Poland	21.56	WR
2nd place, silver medalist(s)	Fedor Trikolich	Russia	21.81	PB
3rd place, bronze medalist(s)	Li Yansong	China	22.04	RR
4	Hilton Langenhoven	South Africa	22.29	
			Wind: +1.0 m/s	

=== T13 ===
The T13 category is for athletes with a moderate visual impairment. Athletes in this category have a variety of visual impairments, but can typically recognize contours from a distance of 2 to 6 metres. Athletes in this category do not typically require a guide.

Final

Rank	Athlete	Country	Time	Notes
1st place, gold medalist(s)	Jason Smyth	Ireland	21.05	WR
2nd place, silver medalist(s)	Alexey Labzin	Russia	21.95	PB
3rd place, bronze medalist(s)	Artem Loginov	Russia	22.03	PB
4	Alexander Zverev	Russia	22.07	PB
5	Luis Felipe Gutierrez	Cuba	22.24	SB
6	Jonathan Ntutu	South Africa	22.37	RR
7	Ayoub Chaoui	Morocco	22.72	
8	Ioannis Protos	Greece	22.97	
			Wind: -0.3 m/s	

=== T34 ===
The T34 category is for wheelchair athletes with cerebral palsy. Athletes in this category have minimal limitations or control problems in their arms and trunk while pushing a wheelchair.

Final

Rank	Athlete	Country	Class	Time	Notes
1st place, gold medalist(s)	Walid Ktila	Tunisia	T34	27.98	WR
2nd place, silver medalist(s)	Mohamed Hammadi	United Arab Emirates	T34	28.95	SB
3rd place, bronze medalist(s)	Rheed McCracken	Australia	T34	29.08	
4	Bojan Mitic	Switzerland	T34	30.35	
5	Austin Pruitt	United States	T34	30.55	
6	Stefan Rusch	Netherlands	T34	30.63	
7	Sebastien Mobre	France	T34	30.67	
8	Jamie Carter	Great Britain	T34	30.94	
				Wind: -0.4 m/s	

=== T35 ===
The T35 category is for ambulant athletes with cerebral palsy. The typical T35 athlete may need assistive devices for walking. The athlete may have sufficient function to run but demonstrates poor balance.

Final

Rank	Athlete	Country	Time	Notes
1st place, gold medalist(s)	Iurii Tsaruk	Ukraine	25.86	WR
2nd place, silver medalist(s)	Fu Xinhan	China	26.21	RR
3rd place, bronze medalist(s)	Hernan Barreto	Argentina	26.59	RR
4	Allel Boukhalfa	Algeria	26.70	RR
5	Teboho Mokgalagadi	South Africa	27.02	PB
6	Ivan Otleykin	Russia	27.82	PB
7	Niels Stein	Germany	27.89	PB
8	Anton Bubnov	Russia	28.21	PB
			Wind: -0.2 m/s	

=== T36 ===
The T36 category is for ambulant athletes with cerebral palsy. These athletes do not have the capacity to remain still and they show involuntary movements with all four limbs affected. They usually walk without assistive devices.

There were no heats in this event. The final was competed on 6 September 2012 at 19:08.

Final

Rank	Athlete	Country	Time	Notes
1st place, gold medalist(s)	Roman Pavlyk	Ukraine	24.70	RR
2nd place, silver medalist(s)	So Wa Wai	Hong Kong	24.77	PB
3rd place, bronze medalist(s)	Ben Rushgrove	Great Britain	24.83	PB
4	Graeme Ballard	Great Britain	25.20	
5	Che Mian	China	25.25	PB
6	Marcin Mielczarek	Poland	26.05	SB
7	Andrey Zhirnov	Russia	26.27	
8	Chris Clemens	United States	26.68	PB
9	Gabriel De Jesus Cuadra Holman	Nicaragua	33.11	SB
			Wind: Nil	

=== T37 ===
The T37 category is for ambulant athletes with cerebral palsy. These athletes have movement and coordination problems on one half of their body. They have good ability in their dominant side of their body (i.e. hemiplegia).

Final

Rank	Athlete	Country	Time	Notes
1st place, gold medalist(s)	Roman Kapranov	Russia	23.10	=WR
2nd place, silver medalist(s)	Shang Guangxu	China	23.15	RR
3rd place, bronze medalist(s)	Omar Monterola	Venezuela	23.34	RR
4	Liang Yongbin	China	23.40	PB
5	Sofiane Hamdi	Algeria	23.67	
6	Fanie van der Merwe	South Africa	23.79	
7	Gocha Khugaev	Russia	24.13	
8	Rhys Jones	Great Britain	24.68	
			Wind: +0.2 m/s	

=== T38 ===
The T38 category is for ambulant athletes with cerebral palsy. T38 athletes have the mildest form of impairment caused by cerebral palsy, often in only one limb, and not affecting the ability to run, walk or jump freely, although impairing performance. T38 athletes may suffer minor co-ordination difficulties.

Final

Rank	Athlete	Country	Time	Notes
1st place, gold medalist(s)	Evan O'Hanlon	Australia	21.82	WR
2nd place, silver medalist(s)	Dyan Buis	South Africa	22.51	RR
3rd place, bronze medalist(s)	Zhou Wenjun	China	22.65	RR
4	Mohamed Farhat Chida	Tunisia	22.81	PB
5	Tim Sullivan	Australia	23.57	
6	Union Sekailwe	South Africa	23.66	PB
7	Lorenzo Albaladejo Martinez	Spain	23.76	
	Edson Pinheiro	Brazil	DNS	
			Wind: -0.2 m/s	

=== T42 ===
The T42 category is for single above-knee amputees and athletes with other impairments that are comparable to a single above knee amputation, including athletes with loss of muscle power in the lower limbs.

There were no heats in this event. The final was competed on 1 September 2012 at 11:23.

Final

Rank	Athlete	Country	Time	Notes
1st place, gold medalist(s)	Richard Whitehead	Great Britain	24.38	WR
2nd place, silver medalist(s)	Shaquille Vance	United States	25.55	RR
3rd place, bronze medalist(s)	Heinrich Popow	Germany	25.90	PB
4	Scott Reardon	Australia	26.03	PB
5	Wojtek Czyz	Germany	26.07	PB
6	Clavel Kayitaré	France	26.22	PB
7	Daniel Jorgensen	Denmark	26.46	PB
8	Atsushi Yamamoto	Japan	26.76	RR
9	Garcia-Tolson Rudy	United States	26.97	PB
			Wind: +0.3 m/s	

=== T44 ===
The T44 category is for athletes who have a single below knee amputation or who can walk with moderately reduced function in one or both legs.

Final

Rank	Athlete	Country	Class	Time	Notes
1st place, gold medalist(s)	Alan Fonteles Cardoso Oliveira	Brazil	T43	21.45	RR
2nd place, silver medalist(s)	Oscar Pistorius	South Africa	T43	21.52	
3rd place, bronze medalist(s)	Blake Leeper	United States	T43	22.46	
4	Arnu Fourie	South Africa	T44	22.49	WR(T44)
5	Jerome Singleton	United States	T44	23.58	
6	Christoph Bausch	Switzerland	T44	23.70	PB
7	David Behre	Germany	T43	23.71	
8	Jim Bob Bizzell	United States	T44	28.19	
				Wind: -0.1 m/s	

=== T46 ===
The T46 category is for athletes who have a single above or below elbow amputation or similar disability, with normal function in both legs.

Final

Rank	Athlete	Country	Class	Time	Notes
1st place, gold medalist(s)	Yohansson Nascimento	Brazil	T45	22.05	WR
2nd place, silver medalist(s)	Raciel Gonzalez Isidoria	Cuba	T46	22.15	
3rd place, bronze medalist(s)	Simon Patmore	Australia	T46	22.36	
4	Antonis Aresti	Cyprus	T46	22.40	RR
5	Yao Jianjun	China	T46	22.81	SB
6	Yury Nosulenko	Russia	T46	22.88	
7	Saidi Adedeji	Nigeria	T46	23.02	SB
	Zhao Xu	China	T45	DQ	
				Wind: +0.1 m/s	

=== T52 ===
The T52 category is for wheelchair athletes with damage to spinal cord in the higher parts of the back, substantially impaired or no trunk function, and minimal or no leg function. Pushing power comes from elbow extensions, and appears close to normal except for use of modified gloves to compensate for grip.

Final

Rank	Athlete	Country	Time	Notes
1st place, gold medalist(s)	Raymond Martin	United States	30.25	PR
2nd place, silver medalist(s)	Tomoya Ito	Japan	31.60	
3rd place, bronze medalist(s)	Salvador Hernandez Mondragon	Mexico	31.81	
4	Beat Boesch	Switzerland	32.75	
5	Leonardo De Jesus Perez Juarez	Mexico	33.16	
6	Paul Nitz	United States	33.31	
7	Peth Rungsri	Thailand	33.60	
8	Josh Roberts	United States	34.44	
			Wind: Nil	

=== T53 ===
The T53 category is for wheelchair athletes with normal use of arms and hands, no or limited trunk function, and no leg function.

Final

Rank	Athlete	Country	Time	Notes
1st place, gold medalist(s)	Li Huzhao	China	25.61	PR
2nd place, silver medalist(s)	Brent Lakatos	Canada	25.85	PB
3rd place, bronze medalist(s)	Zhao Yufei	China	26.00	PB
4	Mickey Bushell	Great Britain	26.32	RR
5	Yu Shiran	China	26.46	
6	Hamad N M E Aladwani	Kuwait	26.50	PB
7	Richard Colman	Australia	26.67	RR
8	Ariosvaldo Fernandes Silva	Brazil	26.83	
			Wind: +0.2 m/s	
