= Athletics at the 2012 Summer Paralympics – Women's 100 metres =

The Women's 100m athletics events for the 2012 Summer Paralympics took place at the London Olympic Stadium from August 31 to September 8. A total of 14 events were contested over this distance for 14 different classifications.

== Results ==
=== T11 ===
The T11 category is for athletes with a visual impairment. A T11 athlete may be entirely without sight, or be able to perceive light, but have no ability to see the shape of a hand at any distance. T11 athletes commonly run with guides.

Final

Rank	Athlete	Country	Time	Notes
1st place, gold medalist(s)	Terezinha Guilhermina; Guide: Guilherme Soares de Santana	Brazil	12.01	WR
2nd place, silver medalist(s)	Jerusa Geber Santos; Guide: Luiz Henrique Barboza Da Silva	Brazil	12.75	
3rd place, bronze medalist(s)	Jhulia Santos; Guide: Fabio Dias de Oliveira Silva	Brazil	12.76	PB
4	Jia Juntingxian; Guide: Xu Donglin	China	12.79	PB
			Wind: +1.2 m/s	

=== T12 ===
The T12 category is for athletes with visual impairment. Athletes in this category will generally have some residual sight, the ability to recognise the shape of a hand at a distance of 2 metres and the ability to perceive clearly will be no more than 2/60. T12 athletes commonly run with guides.

Final

Rank	Athlete	Country	Time	Notes
1st place, gold medalist(s)	Zhou Guohua; Guide: Li Jie	China	12.05	
2nd place, silver medalist(s)	Libby Clegg; Guide: Mikail Huggins	Great Britain	12.13	RR
3rd place, bronze medalist(s)	Oxana Boturchuk	Ukraine	12.18	PB
4	Zhu Daqing; Guide: Zhang Hui	China	12.20	
			Wind: +0.3 m/s	

=== T13 ===
The T13 category is for athletes with a moderate visual impairment. Athletes in this category have a variety of visual impairments, but can typically recognize contours from a distance of 2 to 6 metres. Athletes in this category do not typically require a guide.

Final

Rank	Athlete	Country	Time	Notes
1st place, gold medalist(s)	Omara Durand	Cuba	12.00	PR
2nd place, silver medalist(s)	Ilse Hayes	South Africa	12.41	
3rd place, bronze medalist(s)	Nantenin Keita	France	12.47	RR
4	Alexandra Dimoglou	Greece	12.53	PB
5	Olena Gliebova	Ukraine	12.64	
6	Viviane Soares	Brazil	13.02	PB
7	Anthi Karagianni	Greece	13.23	
8	Johanna Pretorius	South Africa	13.50	
			Wind: +0.5 m/s	

=== T34 ===
The T34 category is for wheelchair athletes with cerebral palsy. Athletes in this category have minimal limitations or control problems in their arms and trunk while pushing a wheelchair.

Final

Rank	Athlete	Country	Class	Time	Notes
1st place, gold medalist(s)	Hannah Cockroft	Great Britain	T34	18.06	PR
2nd place, silver medalist(s)	Amy Siemons	Netherlands	T34	19.49	
3rd place, bronze medalist(s)	Rosemary Little	Australia	T34	19.95	RR
4	Desiree Vranken	Netherlands	T34	20.37	
5	Yousra Ben Jemaa	Tunisia	T34	20.52	RR
6	Kristen Messer	United States	T33	21.59	WRC
7	Carleigh Dewald	United States	T34	21.83	
8	Rachael Burrows	Canada	T34	22.59	
				Wind: -0.4 m/s	

=== T35 ===
The T35 category is for ambulant athletes with cerebral palsy. The typical T35 athlete may need assistive devices for walking. The athlete may have sufficient function to run but demonstrates poor balance.

There were no heats in this event. The final was competed on 7 September 2012 at 19:33.

Final

Rank	Athlete	Country	Time	Notes
1st place, gold medalist(s)	Liu Ping	China	15.44	WR
2nd place, silver medalist(s)	Oxana Corso	Italy	15.94	RR
3rd place, bronze medalist(s)	Virginia McLachlan	Canada	16.42	RR
4	Sophia Warner	Great Britain	16.90	
5	Rachael Dodds	Australia	17.03	PB
6	Anna Luxova	Czech Republic	17.22	PB
7	Fatima Del Rocio Perez Garcia	Mexico	17.51	SB
8	Erinn Walters	Australia	18.09	
			Wind: -0.1 m/s	

=== T36 ===
The T36 category is for ambulant athletes with cerebral palsy. These athletes do not have the capacity to remain still and they show involuntary movements with all four limbs affected. They usually walk without assistive devices.

Final

Rank	Athlete	Country	Time	Notes
1st place, gold medalist(s)	Elena Ivanova	Russia	14.44	SB
2nd place, silver medalist(s)	Jeon Min-Jae	South Korea	14.70	PB
3rd place, bronze medalist(s)	Claudia Nicoleitzik	Germany	14.88	
4	Yanina Andrea Martinez	Argentina	15.00	RR
5	Nadia Schaus	Argentina	15.14	
6	Aygyul Sakhibzadaeva	Russia	15.19	
7	Hazel Robson	Great Britain	15.23	SB
8	Yuki Kato	Japan	15.98	SB
			Wind: +0.7 m/s	

=== T37 ===
The T37 category is for ambulant athletes with cerebral palsy. These athletes have movement and coordination problems on one half of their body. They have good ability in their dominant side of their body (ie hemiplegia).

Final

Rank	Athlete	Country	Time	Notes
1st place, gold medalist(s)	Mandy Francois-Elie	France	14.08	RR
2nd place, silver medalist(s)	Johanna Benson	Namibia	14.23	RR
3rd place, bronze medalist(s)	Neda Bahi	Tunisia	14.36	PB
4	Maria Seifert	Germany	14.37	
5	Oksana Krechunyak	Ukraine	14.37	PB
6	Katrina Hart	Great Britain	14.41	
7	Jenny McLoughlin	Great Britain	14.48	=PB
8	Viktoriya Kravchenko	Ukraine	14.48	
			Wind: +0.7 m/s	

=== T38 ===
The T38 category is for ambulant athletes with cerebral palsy. T38 athletes have the mildest form of impairment caused by cerebral palsy, often in only one limb, and not affecting the ability to run, walk or jump freely, although impairing performance. T38 athletes may suffer minor co-ordination difficulties.

Final

Rank	Athlete	Country	Time	Notes
1st place, gold medalist(s)	Margarita Goncharova	Russia	13.45	PB
2nd place, silver medalist(s)	Chen Junfei	China	13.53	RR
3rd place, bronze medalist(s)	Inna Stryzhak	Ukraine	13.64	SB
4	Xiong Dezhi	China	14.32	
5	Olivia Breen	Great Britain	14.42	
6	Sonia Mansour	Tunisia	14.45	
7	Torita Isaac	Australia	14.50	PB
8	Jenifer Santos	Brazil	14.87	
			Wind: -0.9 m/s	

=== T42 ===
The T42 category is for single above-knee amputees and athletes with other impairments that are comparable to a single above knee amputation, including athletes with loss of muscle power in the lower limbs.

There were no heats in this event. The final was competed on 5 September 2012 at 20:49.

Final

Rank	Athlete	Country	Time	Notes
1st place, gold medalist(s)	Martina Caironi	Italy	15.87	WR
2nd place, silver medalist(s)	Kelly Cartwright	Australia	16.14	RR
3rd place, bronze medalist(s)	Jana Schmidt	Germany	16.19	
4	Vanessa Low	Germany	16.78	
5	Michelle Errichiello	Australia	17.20	SB
6	Katy Sullivan	United States	17.33	PB
7	Ewa Zielinska	Poland	17.47	
8	Marije Smits	Netherlands	18.28	
9	Orianne Lopez	France	18.80	SB
			Wind: -0.3 m/s	

=== T44 ===
The T44 category is for athletes who have a single below knee amputation or who can walk with moderately reduced function in one or both legs.

Final

Rank	Athlete	Time	Notes
1st place, gold medalist(s)	Marie-Amelie le Fur (FRA)	13.26	
2nd place, silver medalist(s)	Marlou van Rhijn (NED)	13.32	
3rd place, bronze medalist(s)	April Holmes (USA)	13.33	SB
4	Katrin Green (GER)	13.61	SB
5	Sophie Kamlish (GBR)	13.98	
6	Juan Wang (CHN)	14.11	
7	Saki Takakuwa (JPN)	14.22	
8	Stef Reid (GBR)	14.25	

=== T46 ===
The T46 category is for athletes who have a single above or below elbow amputation or similar disability, with normal function in both legs.

Final

Rank	Athlete	Country	Time	Notes
1st place, gold medalist(s)	Yunidis Castillo	Cuba	12.01	
2nd place, silver medalist(s)	Nikol Rodomakina	Russia	12.49	RR
3rd place, bronze medalist(s)	Wang Yanping	China	12.89	
4	Katarzyna Piekart	Poland	13.10	
5	Sheila Finder	Brazil	13.33	
6	Sally Brown	Great Britain	13.74	
7	Styliani Smaragdi	Greece	14.01	
0	Carlee Beattie	Australia	DNS	
			Wind: +0.2 m/s	

=== T52 ===
The T52 category is for wheelchair athletes with damage to spinal cord in the higher parts of the back, substantially impaired or no trunk function, and minimal or no leg function. Pushing power comes from elbow extensions, and appears close to normal except for use of modified gloves to compensate for grip.

There were no heats in this event. The final was competed on 5 September 2012 at 21:24.

Final

Rank	Athlete	Country	Time	Notes
1st place, gold medalist(s)	Marieke Vervoort	Belgium	19.69	PR
2nd place, silver medalist(s)	Michelle Stilwell	Canada	19.80	
3rd place, bronze medalist(s)	Kerry Morgan	United States	20.68	
4	Cassie Mitchell	United States	20.86	PB
5	Cheryl Leitner	United States	21.64	SB
6	Teruyo Tanaka	Japan	22.15	SB
7	Yuka Kiyama	Japan	24.28	SB
			Wind: -1.9 m/s	

=== T53 ===
The T53 category is for wheelchair athletes with normal use of arms and hands, no or limited trunk function, and no leg function.

There were no heats in this event. The final was competed on 2 September 2012 at 20:58.

Final

Rank	Athlete	Country	Time	Notes
1st place, gold medalist(s)	Huang Lisha	China	16.42	SB
2nd place, silver medalist(s)	Zhou Hongzhuan	China	16.90	PB
3rd place, bronze medalist(s)	Angela Ballard	Australia	17.14	RR
4	Jessica Galli	United States	17.42	
5	Madison de Rozario	Australia	17.60	
6	Anjali Forber Pratt	United States	17.67	
7	Anita Fordjour	Ghana	18.91	
8	Jessica Cooper Lewis	Bermuda	19.38	
			Wind: -0.5 m/s	

=== T54 ===
The T54 category is for wheelchair athletes with no leg function, but near full arm function and reasonable to normal trunk function. Typically this may be caused by a lower spinal cord injury or spinal cord birth defect.

Final

Rank	Athlete	Country	Time	Notes
1st place, gold medalist(s)	Liu Wenjun	China	15.82	WR
2nd place, silver medalist(s)	Dong Hongjiao	China	15.86	PB
3rd place, bronze medalist(s)	Tatyana McFadden	United States	16.15	
4	Amanda Kotaja	Finland	16.29	RR
5	Manuela Schaer	Switzerland	16.76	
6	Keira-Lyn Frie	Canada	17.26	
7	Yazmith Bataz	Mexico	17.93	
8	Hannah McFadden	United States	18.02	
			Wind: +0.5 m/s	
