= 2012 IPC Athletics European Championships – Women's 100 metres =

The women's 100 metres at the 2012 IPC Athletics European Championships was held at Stadskanaal Stadium from 24–28 July.

== Medalists ==
Results given by IPC Athletics.

Class	Gold	Silver	Bronze
T11	Tracey Hinton; United Kingdom	Paraskevi Kantza; Greece	Miroslava Sedláčková; Czech Republic
T12	Libby Clegg; United Kingdom	Anna Kaniuk; Belarus	Hana Kolníková; Slovakia
T13	Olena Gliebova; Ukraine	Janne Sophie Engeleiter; Germany	Anna Duzikowska; Poland
T34/52/53	Amy Siemons; Netherlands	N/A	N/A
T35	Oxana Corso; Italy	Sophia Warner; United Kingdom	Svitlana Mykytina; Ukraine
T36	Elena Ivanova; Russia	Claudia Nicoleitzik; Germany	Aygyul Sakhibzadaeva; Russia
T37	Maria Seifert; Germany	Mandy Francois-Elie; France	Katrina Hart; United Kingdom
T38	Margarita Goncharova; Russia	Tamira Slaby; Germany	Olivia Breen; United Kingdom
T42	Martina Caironi; Italy	Annette Roozen; Netherlands	Ewa Zielinska; Poland
T44	Marlou van Rhijn; Netherlands	Suzan Verduijn; Netherlands	Iris Pruysen; Netherlands
T46	Nikol Rodomakina; Russia	Elena Chistilina; Russia	Sally Brown; United Kingdom
T54	Amanda Kotaja; Finland	Yvonne Sehmisch; Germany	Zubeyde Supurgeci; Turkey

== Results ==
=== T11 ===
Final

Rank	Sport Class	Name	Nationality	Time	Notes
1st place, gold medalist(s)	T11	Tracey Hinton	United Kingdom	13.22	
2nd place, silver medalist(s)	T11	Paraskevi Kantza	Greece	13.52	
3rd place, bronze medalist(s)	T11	Miroslava Sedláčková	Czech Republic	13.96	
—	T11	Viktoria Karlsson	Sweden	DQ	

=== T12 ===
Heats

Rank	Heat	Sport Class	Name	Nationality	Time	Notes
1	2	T12	Eva Ngui	Spain	12.78	Q
2	1	T12	Libby Clegg	United Kingdom	12.82	Q
3	2	T12	Anna Kaniuk	Belarus	12.84	q, SB
4	2	T12	Katrin Mueller-Rottgardt	Germany	12.92	SB
5	3	T12	Hana Kolníková	Slovakia	12.96	Q
6	1	T12	Volha Zinkevich	Belarus	13.20	
7	3	T12	Elisabetta Stefanini	Italy	13.43	
8	3	T12	Sara Martinez	Spain	13.51	
9	1	T12	Melani Berges Gamez	Spain	13.77	
10	2	T12	Gluosne Norkute	Lithuania	14.85	

Final

Rank	Sport Class	Name	Nationality	Time	Notes
1st place, gold medalist(s)	T12	Libby Clegg	United Kingdom	12.55	
2nd place, silver medalist(s)	T12	Anna Kaniuk	Belarus	12.66	
3rd place, bronze medalist(s)	T12	Hana Kolníková	Slovakia	12.69	
4	T12	Eva Ngui	Spain	12.70	

=== T13 ===
Final

Rank	Sport Class	Name	Nationality	Time	Notes
1st place, gold medalist(s)	T13	Olena Gliebova	Ukraine	12.40	ER
2nd place, silver medalist(s)	T13	Janne Sophie Engeleiter	Germany	13.67	SB
3rd place, bronze medalist(s)	T13	Anna Duzikowska	Poland	13.82	SB
4	T13	Gurbet Damar	Turkey	14.20	
—	T13	Maryna Chyshko	Ukraine	DNF	
—	T13	Alexandra Dimoglou	Greece	DNF	
—	T13	Anthi Karagianni	Greece	DQ	

=== T34/52/53 ===
Final

Rank	Sport Class	Name	Nationality	Time	Notes
1st place, gold medalist(s)	T34	Amy Siemons	Netherlands	19.39	
2nd place, silver medalist(s)	T34	Desiree Vranken	Netherlands	20.56	

=== T35 ===
Final

Rank	Sport Class	Name	Nationality	Time	Notes
1st place, gold medalist(s)	T35	Oxana Corso	Italy	16.07	ER
2nd place, silver medalist(s)	T35	Sophia Warner	United Kingdom	16.70	
3rd place, bronze medalist(s)	T35	Svitlana Mykytina	Ukraine	16.74	SB
4	T35	Anna Luxová	Czech Republic	17.32	SB
5	T35	Uta Streckert	Germany	17.89	SB
6	T35	Klaudia Maliszewska	Poland	19.34	

=== T36 ===
Rank	Sport Class	Name	Nationality	Time	Notes
1st place, gold medalist(s)	T36	Elena Ivanova	Russia	14.55	
2nd place, silver medalist(s)	T36	Claudia Nicoleitzik	Germany	14.85	SB
3rd place, bronze medalist(s)	T36	Aygyul Sakhibzadaeva	Russia	15.17	
4	T36	Lidia Lorente Fernandez	Spain	17.09	

=== T37 ===
Heats

Rank	Heat	Sport Class	Name	Nationality	Time	Notes
1	1	T37	Maria Seifert	Germany	14.23	Q, SB
2	1	T37	Mandy Francois-Elie	France	14.29	Q
3	2	T37	Viktoriya Kravchenko	Ukraine	14.38	Q
4	1	T37	Katrina Hart	United Kingdom	14.52	Q
5	1	T37	Jenny McLoughlin	United Kingdom	14.71	q
6	2	T37	Oksana Krechunyak	Ukraine	14.75	Q
7	2	T37	Anastasiya Ovsyannikova	Russia	14.77	Q, SB
8	1	T37	Svetlana Sergeeva	Russia	14.78	q
9	2	T37	Isabelle Foerder	Germany	15.14	
10	1	T37	Natalia Jasinska	Poland	15.17	
11	2	T37	Matthildur Thorsteinsdottir	Iceland	15.89	
—	2	T37	Marta Langner	Poland	DNF	

Final

Rank	Sport Class	Name	Nationality	Time	Notes
1st place, gold medalist(s)	T37	Maria Seifert	Germany	14.21	
2nd place, silver medalist(s)	T37	Mandy Francois-Elie	France	14.22	
3rd place, bronze medalist(s)	T37	Katrina Hart	United Kingdom	14.32	
4	T37	Viktoriya Kravchenko	Ukraine	14.37	
5	T37	Jenny McLoughlin	United Kingdom	14.67	
6	T37	Svetlana Sergeeva	Russia	14.84	
7	T37	Oksana Krechunyak	Ukraine	14.85	
8	T37	Anastasiya Ovsyannikova	Russia	14.94	

=== T38 ===
Final

Rank	Sport Class	Name	Nationality	Time	Notes
1st place, gold medalist(s)	T38	Margarita Goncharova	Russia	13.70	
2nd place, silver medalist(s)	T38	Tamira Slaby	Germany	14.01	SB
3rd place, bronze medalist(s)	T38	Olivia Breen	United Kingdom	14.10	
4	T38	Katsiaryna Kirushchanka	Belarus	14.64	
—	T38	Inna Stryzhak	Ukraine	DNS	

=== T42 ===
Final

Rank	Sport Class	Name	Nationality	Time	Notes
1st place, gold medalist(s)	T42	Martina Caironi	Italy	15.89	WR
2nd place, silver medalist(s)	T42	Annette Roozen	Netherlands	16.67	
3rd place, bronze medalist(s)	T42	Ewa Zielinska	Poland	17.25	
4	T42	Marije Smits	Netherlands	17.49	SB

=== T44 ===
Final

Rank	Sport Class	Name	Nationality	Time	Notes
1st place, gold medalist(s)	T43	Marlou van Rhijn	Netherlands	13.62	SB
2nd place, silver medalist(s)	T44	Suzan Verduijn	Netherlands	14.53	
3rd place, bronze medalist(s)	T44	Iris Pruysen	Netherlands	15.21	SB
4	T43	Giuseppina Versace	Italy	15.52	SB
5	T43	Federica Maspero	Italy	16.02	

=== T46 ===
Final

Rank	Sport Class	Name	Nationality	Time	Notes
1st place, gold medalist(s)	T46	Nikol Rodomakina	Russia	12.51	
2nd place, silver medalist(s)	T46	Elena Chistlina	Russia	13.18	
3rd place, bronze medalist(s)	T46	Sally Brown	United Kingdom	13.61	

=== T54 ===
Final

Rank	Sport Class	Name	Nationality	Time	Notes
1st place, gold medalist(s)	T54	Amanda Kotaja	Finland	17.07	SB
2nd place, silver medalist(s)	T54	Yvonne Sehmisch	Germany	18.10	
3rd place, bronze medalist(s)	T54	Zubeyde Supurgeci	Turkey	18.38	
—	T54	Akzhana Abdikarimova	Russia	DQ	

== See also ==
- List of IPC world records in athletics
