= 2012 IPC Athletics European Championships – Women's 200 metres =

The women's 200 metres at the 2012 IPC Athletics European Championships was held at Stadskanaal Stadium from 24–28 July.

== Medalists ==
Results given by IPC Athletics.

Class	Gold	Silver	Bronze
T11	Tracey Hinton; United Kingdom	Miroslava Sedláčková; Czech Republic	Paraskevi Kantza; Greece
T12	Libby Clegg; United Kingdom	Hana Kolníková; Slovakia	Volha Zinkevich; Belarus
T34/52/53	Hamide Kurt; Turkey	Amy Siemons; Netherlands	
T35	Oxana Corso; Italy	Svitlana Mykytina; Ukraine	Sophia Warner; United Kingdom
T36	Elena Ivanova; Russia	Claudia Nicoleitzik; Germany	Aygyul Sakhibzadaeva; Russia
T37	Maria Seifert; Germany	Jenny McLoughlin; United Kingdom	Katrina Hart; United Kingdom
T38	Margarita Goncharova; Russia	Tamira Slaby; Germany	Olivia Breen; United Kingdom
T44	Marlou van Rhijn; Netherlands	Suzan Verduijn; Netherlands	Iris Pruysen; Netherlands
T46	Nikol Rodomakina; Russia	Elena Chistilina; Russia	Sally Brown; United Kingdom

== Results ==
=== T11 ===
Final

Rank	Sport Class	Name	Nationality	Time	Notes
1st place, gold medalist(s)	T11	Tracey Hinton	United Kingdom	27.31	
2nd place, silver medalist(s)	T11	Miroslava Sedláčková	Czech Republic	28.12	
3rd place, bronze medalist(s)	T11	Paraskevi Kantza	Greece	28.86	

=== T12 ===
Heats

Rank	Heat	Sport Class	Name	Nationality	Time	Notes
1	2	T12	Libby Clegg	United Kingdom	25.78	Q
2	1	T12	Hana Kolníková	Slovakia	26.06	Q, SB
3	2	T12	Volha Zinkevich	Belarus	27.03	q
4	1	T12	Svetlana Makeeva	Russia	27.37	SB
5	1	T12	Elisabetta Stefanini	Italy	27.80	
6	2	T12	Veronika Zotova	Russia	28.83	

Final

Rank	Sport Class	Name	Nationality	Time	Notes
1st place, gold medalist(s)	T12	Libby Clegg	United Kingdom	25.47	
2nd place, silver medalist(s)	T12	Hana Kolníková	Slovakia	26.08	
3rd place, bronze medalist(s)	T12	Volha Zinkevich	Belarus	26.83	

=== T34/52/53 ===
Final

Rank	Sport Class	Name	Nationality	Time	Notes
1st place, gold medalist(s)	T53	Hamide Kurt	Turkey	34.96	
2nd place, silver medalist(s)	T34	Amy Siemons	Netherlands	35.92	SB
—	T34	Desiree Vranken	Netherlands	DQ	

=== T35 ===
Final

Rank	Sport Class	Name	Nationality	Time	Notes
1st place, gold medalist(s)	T35	Oxana Corso	Italy	33.72	ER
2nd place, silver medalist(s)	T35	Svitlana Mykytina	Ukraine	35.14	SB
3rd place, bronze medalist(s)	T35	Sophia Warner	United Kingdom	35.91	SB
4	T35	Uta Streckert	Germany	37.66	SB
5	T35	Klaudia Maliszewska	Poland	42.91	
6	T35	Anna Luxová	Czech Republic	59.72	

=== T36 ===
Final

Rank	Sport Class	Name	Nationality	Time	Notes
1st place, gold medalist(s)	T36	Elena Ivanova	Russia	30.61	
2nd place, silver medalist(s)	T36	Claudia Nicoleitzik	Germany	31.62	
3rd place, bronze medalist(s)	T36	Aygyul Sakhibzadaeva	Russia	35.49	
4	T36	Lidia Lorente Fernandez	Spain	38.87	

=== T37 ===
Heats

Rank	Heat	Sport Class	Name	Nationality	Time	Notes
1	2	T37	Maria Seifert	Germany	30.18	Q
2	1	T37	Jenny McLoughlin	United Kingdom	30.23	Q
3	2	T37	Katrina Hart	United Kingdom	30.26	Q
4	1	T37	Viktoriya Kravchenko	Ukraine	30.41	Q
5	2	T37	Anastasiya Ovsyannikova	Russia	30.59	q, SB
6	2	T37	Svetlana Sergeeva	Russia	31.12	q
7	1	T37	Isabelle Foerder	Germany	31.63	
8	1	T37	Matthildur Thorsteinsdottir	Iceland	32.51	
—	2	T37	Oksana Krechunyak	Ukraine	DQ	
—	1	T37	Evgeniya Trushnikova	Russia	DQ	

Final

Rank	Sport Class	Name	Nationality	Time	Notes
1st place, gold medalist(s)	T37	Maria Seifert	Germany	29.94	ER
2nd place, silver medalist(s)	T37	Jenny McLoughlin	United Kingdom	30.10	SB
3rd place, bronze medalist(s)	T37	Katrina Hart	United Kingdom	30.20	
4	T37	Viktoriya Kravchenko	Ukraine	30.43	
5	T37	Anastasiya Ovsyannikova	Russia	30.74	
6	T37	Svetlana Sergeeva	Russia	31.31	

=== T38 ===
Final

Rank	Sport Class	Name	Nationality	Time	Notes
1st place, gold medalist(s)	T38	Margarita Goncharova	Russia	28.39	
2nd place, silver medalist(s)	T38	Tamira Slaby	Germany	29.03	
3rd place, bronze medalist(s)	T38	Olivia Breen	United Kingdom	29.07	
4	T38	Katsiaryna Kirushchanka	Belarus	30.40	

=== T44 ===
Final

Rank	Sport Class	Name	Nationality	Time	Notes
1st place, gold medalist(s)	T43	Marlou van Rhijn	Netherlands	26.98	
2nd place, silver medalist(s)	T44	Suzan Verduijn	Netherlands	29.91	
3rd place, bronze medalist(s)	T44	Iris Pruysen	Netherlands	30.96	
4	T43	Giuseppina Versace	Italy	32.25	
—	T43	Federica Maspero	Italy	DQ	

=== T46 ===
Final

Rank	Sport Class	Name	Nationality	Time	Notes
1st place, gold medalist(s)	T46	Nikol Rodomakina	Russia	25.88	
2nd place, silver medalist(s)	T46	Elena Chistilina	Russia	27.20	
3rd place, bronze medalist(s)	T46	Sally Brown	United Kingdom	27.42	
4	T46	Alexandra Moguchaya	Russia	27.48	

== See also ==
- List of IPC world records in athletics
