= 2011 IPC Athletics World Championships – Women's 200 metres =

The women's 200 metres at the 2011 IPC Athletics World Championships was held at the QEII Stadium from 22–28 January

== Medalists ==
Class	Gold	Silver	Bronze
T11	Terezinha Guilhermina; Brazil	Jerusa Geber Santos; Brazil	Tracey Hinton; Great Britain
T12	Assia El Hannouni; France	Hana Kolníková; Slovakia	Elizabeth Clegg; Great Britain
T13	Omara Durand; Cuba	Sanaa Benhama; Morocco	Ilse Hayes; South Africa
T34	Hannah Cockroft; Great Britain	Haruka Kitaura; Japan	Kristen Messer; United States
T35	Rachael Dodds; Australia	Sophia Warner; Great Britain	Uta Streckert; Germany
T36	Elena Ivanova; Russia	Wang Fang; China	Claudia Nicoleitzik; Germany
T37	Katrina Hart; Great Britain	Svetlana Sergeeva; Russia	Viktoriya Kravchenko; Ukraine
T38	Margarita Koptilova; Russia	Sonia Mansour; Tunisia	Inna Dyachenko; Ukraine
T44	Marie-Amélie Le Fur; France	Katrin Green; Germany	Stefanie Reid; Great Britain
T46	Yunidis Castillo; Cuba	Nikol Rodomakina; Russia	Sally Brown; Great Britain
T52	Michelle Stilwell; Canada	Kerry Morgan; United States	Teruyo Tanaka; Japan
T53	Anjali Forber Pratt; United States	Huang Lisha; China	Zhou Hongzhuan; China
T54	Tatyana McFadden; United States	Zhang Ting; China	Manuela Schär; Switzerland
