= 2011 IPC Athletics World Championships – Women's 100 metres =

The women's 100 metres at the 2011 IPC Athletics World Championships was held at the QEII Stadium from 22–26 January

== Medalists ==
Class	Gold	Silver	Bronze
T11	Terezinha Guilhermina; Brazil	Jerusa Geber Santos; Brazil	Wu Chunmiao; China
T12	Elizabeth Clegg; Great Britain	Hana Kolníková; Slovakia	Eva Ngui; Spain
T13	Ilse Hayes; South Africa	Sanaa Benhama; Morocco	Nantenin Keita; France
T34	Hannah Cockroft; Great Britain	Haruka Kitaura; Japan	Kristen Messer; United States
T35	Liu Ping; China	Rachael Dodds; Australia	Sophia Warner; Great Britain
T36	Elena Ivanova; Russia	Hazel Robson; Great Britain	Aygyul Sakhibzadaeva; Russia
T37	Viktoriya Kravchenko; Ukraine	Maria Seifert; Germany	Katrina Hart; Great Britain
T38	Inna Dyachenko; Ukraine	Margarita Koptilova; Russia	Sonia Mansour; Tunisia
T42	Kelly Cartwright; Australia	Jana Schmidt; Germany	Vanessa Low; Germany
T44	Marie-Amélie Le Fur; France	Katrin Green; Germany	April Holmes; United States
T46	Yunidis Castillo; Cuba	Nikol Rodomakina; Russia	Carlee Beattie; Australia
T52	Michelle Stilwell; Canada	Kerry Morgan; United States	Teruyo Tanaka; Japan
T53	Huang Lisha; China	Anjali Forber-Pratt; United States	Zhou Hongzhuan; China
T54	Hongjiao Dong; China	Liu Wenjun; China	Tatyana McFadden; United States
