= Tracey Hinton =

Cardiff-born paralympian track athlete

Medal record

Track and field (B1)(T11)(T12)

Representing Great Britain

Paralympic Games
Silver medal – second place	1992 Barcelona	400m - B1
Silver medal – second place	1992 Barcelona	200m - B1
Silver medal – second place	2000 Sydney	800m - T12
Bronze medal – third place	1992 Barcelona	100m - B1
Bronze medal – third place	2000 Sydney	200m - T11
Bronze medal – third place	2000 Sydney	400m - T11

IPC Athletics World Championships
Silver medal – second place	2011 Christchurch	100m - T11
Bronze medal – third place	2011 Christchurch	200m - T11

IPC Athletics European Championships
Gold medal – first place	2012 Stadskanaal	100m - T11
Gold medal – first place	2012 Stadskanaal	200m - T11

Tracey Hinton (born 19 March 1970) is a Paralympic athlete being visually impaired and classed as T11 in the Paralympic classification system. Born in Cardiff and a member of Cardiff Amateur Athletic Club, Hinton has been blind since having cancer of the retina aged four which resulted in her losing her sight. She has won three silver and three bronze medals at Paralympic level.

She competed in the 1992 Summer Paralympics winning a silver medal in the 400m B1, a silver medal in the 200m B1 and a bronze medal in the 100m B1. 2000 saw her win bronze medals in the T11 200m and T11 400m and silver in the T12 800m. She is the 800 metres world record holder in her class with a time of 2mins:17.66secs.

Hinton has been selected to compete in the 2012 Summer Paralympics, her sixth games. She was chosen as captain of the women's athletics squad for Great Britain at the 2012 Summer Paralympics.

Hinton participated at the 2014 Commonwealth Games in the T11/T12 100m, qualifying for the final with a run of 13.80 seconds with her guide Stefan Hughes.
