= Olivia Breen =

Welsh Paralympic athlete

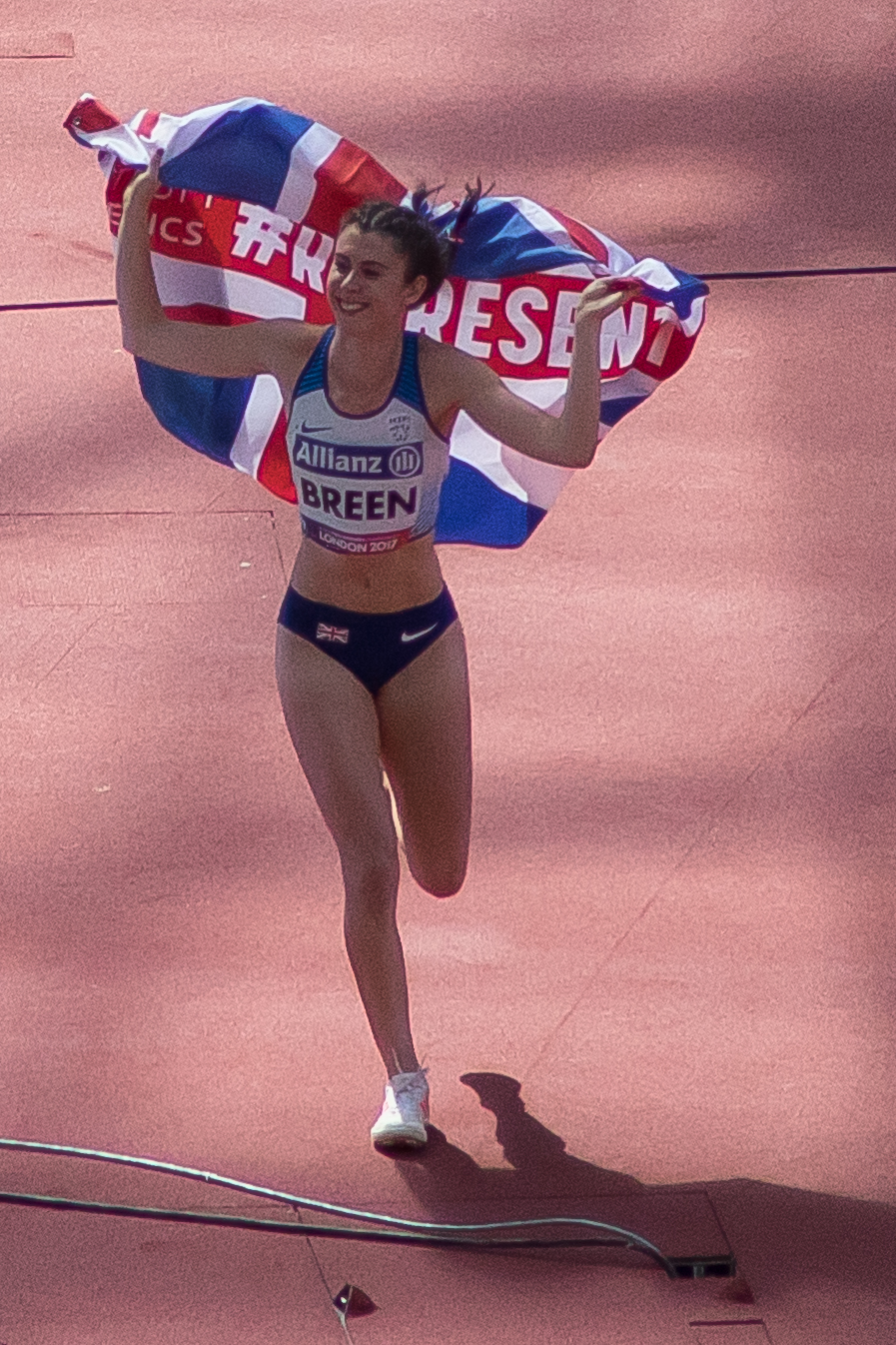
- Olivia Breen during the London 2017 World Para Athletics Championships

Personal information
- Full name: Olivia Grace Helena Breen
- Nickname: Livvy
- Nationality: United Kingdom
- Born: 26 July 1996 (age 30) Guildford, England

Sport
- Country: Great Britain
- Sport: Athletics
- Events: T38 sprint and F38 long jump
- Club: City of Portsmouth
- Coached by: Aston Moore

Achievements and titles
- Paralympic finals: 2012
- Highest world ranking: T38 100m: 2nd T38 200m: 3rd
- Personal bests: 100m sprint: 13.34 secs 200m sprint: 28.07 secs
Medal record
Track and field (athletics)
Representing Great Britain
Paralympic Games
Bronze medal – third place	2012 London	Women's 4x100m Relay T35-T38
Bronze medal – third place	2020 Tokyo	Long jump – T38
World Para Athletics Championships
Gold medal – first place	2015 Doha	4 × 100 m relay – T35-38
Gold medal – first place	2017 London	Long jump – T38
Silver medal – second place	2023 Paris	Long jump – T38
Bronze medal – third place	2019 Dubai	Long jump – T38
European Championships
Gold medal – first place	2016 Grosseto	4 × 100 m relay – T35-38
Silver medal – second place	2014 Swansea	4 × 100 m relay – T35-38
Bronze medal – third place	2021 Bydgoszcz	Long jump - T38
Bronze medal – third place	2018 Berlin	100m - T38
Bronze medal – third place	2012 Stadskanaal	100m – T38
Bronze medal – third place	2012 Stadskanaal	200m – T38
Bronze medal – third place	2014 Swansea	100m – T38
Representing Wales
Commonwealth Games
Gold medal – first place	2018 Gold Coast	Long jump – T38
Gold medal – first place	2022 Birmingham	100m – T38
Silver medal – second place	2026 Glasgow	100m – T38
Bronze medal – third place	2018 Gold Coast	100m – T38

Olivia Breen (born 26 July 1996) is a Welsh Paralympian who competes for Wales and Great Britain mainly in T38 sprint and F38 long jump events. She represented Great Britain at the 2012, 2016, 2020 and 2024 Summer Paralympics winning Bronze in 2020 in the Long Jump and in 2012 as part of the Relay Team she also represented Wales at the 2014, 2018, 2022 and 2026 Commonwealth Games where she won gold in the F38 Long Jump in 2018 and 2026, gold in the T37/38 100m in 2022 and Silver in the T37/38 100m in 2026 . At the 2026 Commonwealth Games in Glasgow, Scotland she served as Team Captain for Wales

== Early life ==
Breen was born in England to a Welsh mother and Irish father. Breen, who has cerebral palsy, began racing while still at primary school.

== Career ==
Breen was given her T38 classification in January 2012, allowing her to be brought into contention for Paralympic selection. In June 2012 she competed in the IPC Athletics European Championships in Stadskanaal in the Netherlands, winning the bronze in both the 100m and 200m sprints. She recorded a personal best in the 100m at the European championships, and followed this with a personal best in the 200m sprint at the Diamond League meet at Crystal Palace, London early in July. Her times resulted in a late call up to the Great Britain team for the 2012 Summer Paralympics. She was the youngest member of the Great Britain Paralympic athletics team during the 2012 Games.

Breen is coached by Aston Moore a long jump coach based in Loughborough.

=== 2012 Paralympic Games in London ===
Breen competed in London in the T38 100m and 200m sprints, and the first leg of the T35-38 women's relay team.

100m: Breen came fifth in the 100m final with a time of 14.42. The winning time was posted by Margarita Goncharova at 13.45s.

200m: After qualifying as the second fastest runner up, Breen came in eighth in the 200m final with a time of 30.22s.

4 × 100 m relay: Breen (who ran the first leg of the relay final) won a bronze medal with teammates Jenny McLoughlin, Bethy Woodward and Katrina Hart with a time of 56.08s which was a season's best. The final baton change between Hart and McLoughlin was affected by a bump from the athlete in the next lane but the team was judged to have correctly handed the baton moments before the last team member exited the hand-over zone, while in the same race two of the opposing teams were disqualified.

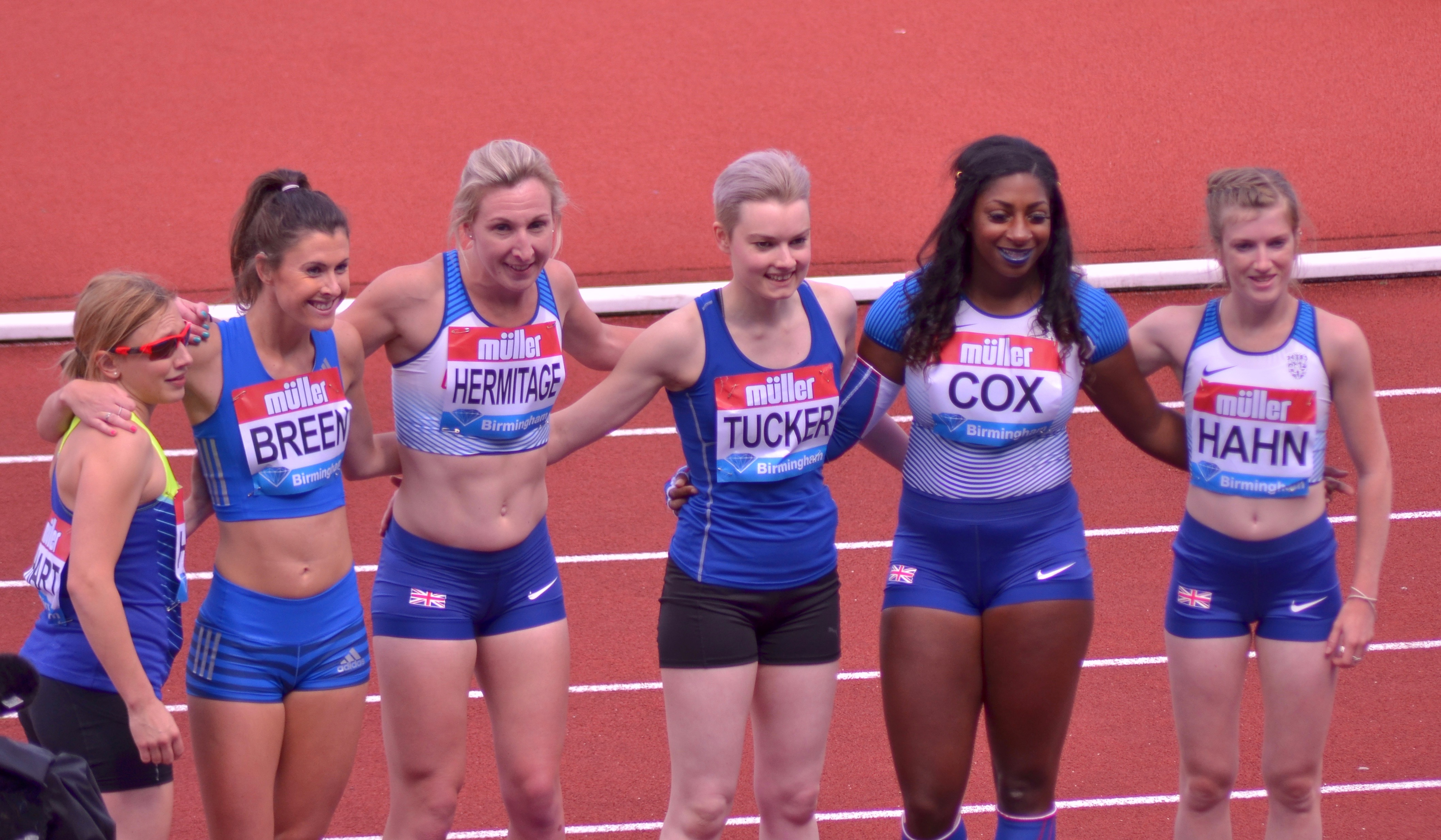
Katrina Hart, Olivia Breen, Georgina Hermitage, Bethany Tucker, Kadeena Cox and Sophie Hahn in 2017

=== 2013 IPC World Championships in Lyon ===
Breen finished fifth in both the 100m and 200m in Lyon at the IPC World Championships.

=== 2014 ===
Breen switched from sprints to compete in the long jump for Wales at the Commonwealth Games finishing narrowly out of the medals in seventh place.

The teenager then went on to compete at the IPC European Championships where she won individual bronze in the 100m behind teammate Sophie Hahn and Russia's Margarita Goncharova just a few months after recording a new personal best over the distance – 13.47.

Breen then ran the second leg of the T35-38 relay team, which included Bethany Woodward, Sophie Hahn and Jenny McLoughlin. The team went on to win silver behind Russia in a new British record of 53.84.

=== 2017 ===
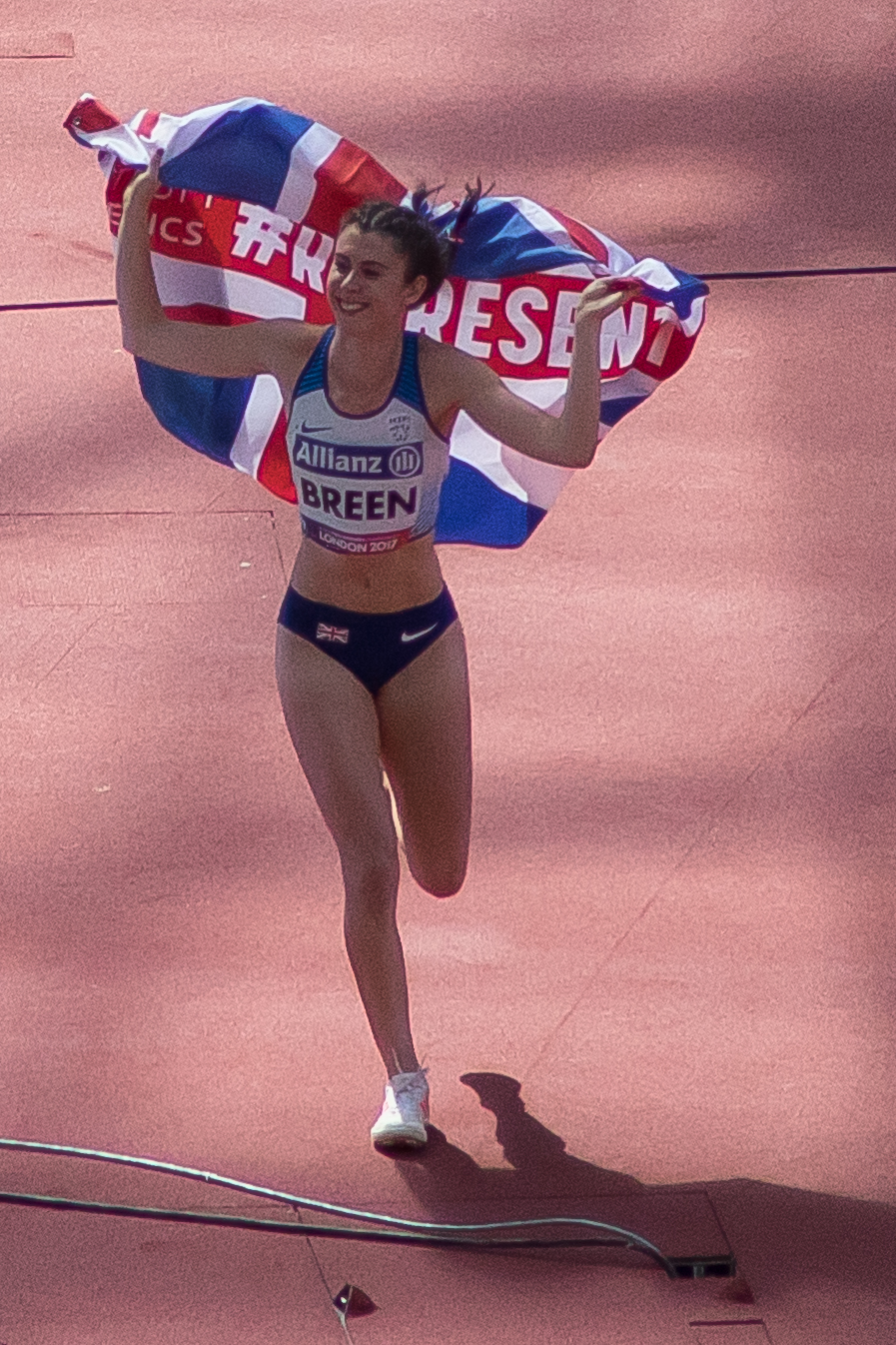
Olivia Breen at the 2017 Paragames celebrating a gold medal

At the 2017 World Para Athletics Championships in London Breen secured a gold medal in the F38 Long Jump jumping a lifetime best of 4.81m. A few days later she came fourth in the T38 100m.

=== 2020 Summer Paralympics ===
Breen was part of the Great Britain team at the delayed 2020 Summer Paralympics in Tokyo. She won a bronze medal in the long jump.

=== 2022 Commonwealth Games and Wales Sports Personality of the Year ===
Breen took the gold medal in the Women's T38 100m Final in the 2022 Commonwealth Games in Birmingham. Later in the year she was named BBC Cymru Wales Sports Personality of the Year for 2022.

=== 2023 World Championships ===
Breen won a silver medal in the long jump at the World Para Athletics Championships in Paris as well as finishing sixth in the 100 metres.

=== 2024 Summer Paralympics ===
In June, Breen was among the first 10 members of the Great Britain athletics team selected for the 2024 Summer Paralympics where she competed in the long jump and the 100m.

She failed to reach the 100m final, finishing 4th in her heat. In the long jump she jumped 4.99 metres, which was level with Karen Palomeque, but due to her second longest jump being shorter, Karen received the bronze and Olivia finished in 4th place.
