= Annette Roozen =

Dutch Paralympic athlete (born 1976)

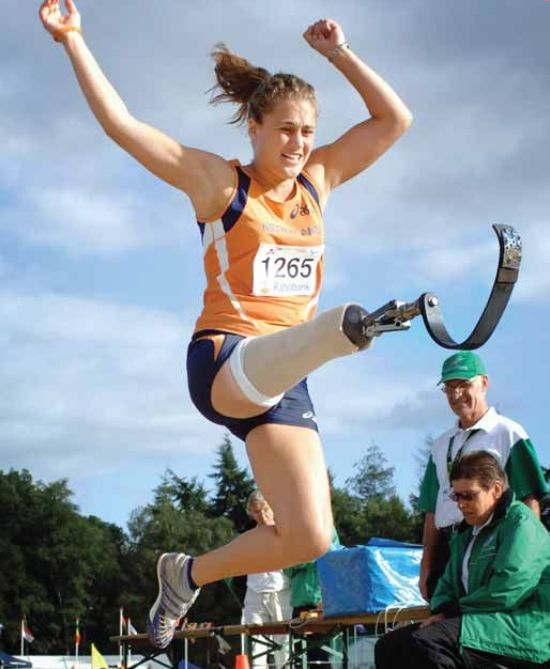
- Roozen performing the long jump

Personal information
- Full name: Annette Roozen
- Nationality: Dutch
- Born: 11 March 1976 (age 50) Utrecht

Sport
- Country: Netherlands
- Sport: paraplegic track and field

Achievements and titles
- Paralympic finals: 2008 Summer Paralympics
Medal record
Representing Netherlands
Women's athletics
Paralympic Games
Silver medal – second place	2008 Beijing	Long jump F42
Silver medal – second place	2008 Beijing	100 m T42
European Championships
Silver medal – second place	2012 Stadskanaal	100m T42

Annette Roozen (born 11 March 1976) is a Dutch Paralympic track and field athlete.

When Roozen was sixteen years old, her right leg had to be amputated due to osteosarcoma. Five years later, in 1997, she attended a local sports day for prosthesis users where her interest in athletics was born. Her first international title came in 2003 when she won the 100 metres sprint at the European Championships in Assen in a time of 18.11 seconds, at that time a new European record. That same day she also participated at the long jump, winning the bronze medal with a leap of 2.95 metres. A month later, she won two gold medals at the Open German Championships in Wattenscheid. She broke the world records in both disciplines: 17.85 seconds over 100 metres and 3.19 metres in the long jump. On 31 May 2004 she broke the World record over 100 metres again, this time during the FBK-Games in Hengelo with a time of 17.20 seconds. She represented the Netherlands at the 2004 Summer Paralympics in Athens, not in the 100 metres, but only in the long jump. She jumped a personal best of 3.33 metres, but eventually finished in fifth position, without winning a medal.

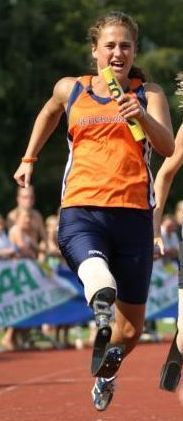
Roozen running a relay

In Lelystad, she took part in the 2005 Dutch National Championships for Parathletes, where she won her first national titles, coming first in both the 100 metres and the long jump. A day later, she improved her personal best and national record at the long jump to 3.55 metres during the FBK-Games of that year. She successfully defended her national titles in both disciplines and at the Paralympic Challenge in Duderstadt on 20 May 2006 she ran a new world record over 100 metres in 16.90 seconds. In Leverkusen on 25 August 2006 she broke the European record in the long jump with 3.61 metres. Back in her home country in Assen, they organized the 2006 World Championships and Roozen became double World Champion. She won the 100 metres in 16.96 seconds and made a distance of 3.49 metres in the long jump.

In 2007, she did not become the Dutch national 100 metres champion again, but she succeeded for the third consecutive time in the long jump, with a distance of 3.50 metres. Despite missing her third national 100 metres title, she ran a new, but unofficial world record at the Run2Day Track Meetings in Utrecht, to improve to 16.64 seconds. At the 2007 FBK-Games, she jumped 3.57 metres in the long jump and she won the 100 metres race in 16.75 seconds, this time an official World record. On 17 June 2007, in Stadskanaal during the Nelli Cooman-Games, she broke the world record again, this time in 16.57 seconds. She also participated in a race over 200 metres for the very first time in her career, running straight to a new World record of 34.46 seconds. Due to this effort she won the "Bronze Nelli Cooman Trophy". At the end of the year she was named Dutch sportsperson of the year with a disability (Joke van Rijswijk Trophy), however she had to share the title with Marion Nijhof, a blind swimmer.

On 1 June 2008, at the Open Dutch Championships in Emmeloord, Roozen once again broke the 100 metres world record with a new best time of 16.48 seconds. She represented the Netherlands at the 2008 Summer Paralympics in Beijing, where she qualified for the 100 metres and the long jump. The 200 metres in her class was not run during the Paralympics. In the long jump, she made 3.23 metres in her first jump, being only in fifth position after. With her second jump of 3.63 metres, she jumped further than any of the other athletes did in the first jump; however Christine Wolf jumped 3.65 metres that same round to take the lead. None of the others managed to get over the 3.63, although Ewa Zielinska came close with 3.62 metres. In the last part of the competition, Wolf jumped 3.73 metres and a new world record in her fifth out of six jumps. Roozen was unable to jump that far and won the silver medal. Zielinska took the bronze.

== See also ==
- The Mechanics of Running Blades

Awards
Preceded by (Netherlands) Pieter Gruijters	Dutch Disabled Sportsman / woman of the Year; 2007 (with Marion Nijhof)	Succeeded by (Netherlands) Esther Vergeer
