= 2011 IPC Athletics World Championships – Women's 4 × 400 metres relay =

The women's 4 x 400 metres relay at the 2011 IPC Athletics World Championships was held at the QEII Stadium on 27 January 2011.

== Medalists ==
Class	Gold	Silver	Bronze
T53/54	China; Zhang Ting; Huang Lisha; Liu Wenjun; Zhou Hongzhuan	United States; Tatyana McFadden; Jessica Galli; Shirley Reilly; Anjali Forber Pratt	

== T53/54 ==
T53 = normal upper limb function, no abdominal, leg or lower spinal function.

T54 = normal upper limb function, partial to normal trunk function, may have significant function of the lower limbs.

=== Results ===
==== Final ====
Rank	Nation	Athletes	Time	Notes
1st place, gold medalist(s)	China	Zhang Ting, Huang Lisha, Liu Wenjun, Zhou Hongzhuan	3:46.11	WR
2nd place, silver medalist(s)	United States	Tatyana McFadden, Jessica Galli, Shirley Reilly, Anjali Forber Pratt	3:57.39	AR

Key: WR = World Record, AR = Continental Record
