= Sally Brown (athlete) =

Northern Irish para athlete

Personal information
- Nationality: United Kingdom
- Born: 26 June 1995 (age 31) Derry, Northern Ireland

Sport
- Country: Great Britain
- Sport: Athletics
- Event: T46 sprint
- Club: Springwell Runners
- Coached by: Phillip Tweedy

Achievements and titles
- Paralympic finals: 2012
- Personal best(s): 100m sprint: 13.15; 200m sprint: 26.38
Medal record
Track and field (athletics)
Representing Great Britain
IPC World Championships
Bronze medal – third place	2011 Christchurch	200m - T46
IPC European Championships
Bronze medal – third place	2012 Stadskanaal	100m - T46
Bronze medal – third place	2012 Stadskanaal	200m - T46

Sally Brown (born 26 June 1995) is a Paralympian athlete from Northern Ireland competing mainly in T46 sprint events. In 2012, she qualified for the 2012 Summer Paralympics and was selected for the T46 100m and 200m sprints.

== Personal history ==
Brown was born in Derry in Northern Ireland and grew up in the village of Ballykelly. She was born with dysmelia in her lower arms which resulted in her left arm not fully developing. She was educated at Limavady High School before moving to Loughborough in England in 2013.

Brown is in a relationship with fellow Paralympian Jonnie Peacock.

== Sports career ==
Brown took up athletics for enjoyment as a nine-year-old. She joined Springwell Runners and began entering junior competitions. In 2009, she took on Phillip Tweedy as her coach and the next year she took silver in the IWAS World Junior Championships in Olomouc in the Czech Republic.

Brown's time in the 100m and 200m sprint continued to impress and in January 2011, at the age of 15, she was selected for the Great Britain squad to compete in the 2011 IPC Athletics World Championship in Christchurch, New Zealand. In Christchurch she qualified through the heats of both the 100m and 200m T46 sprints. In the finals Brown finished sixth in the 100m, and third in the 200m securing the bronze medal. In April 2011 she travelled to Dubai to take part in her second IWAS World Junior Championships, winning gold in the 100m and silver in the 200m.

In 2012 Brown was again selected for the Great Britain team, travelling to Stadskanaal in the Netherlands to compete in the IPC Athletics European Championships. There she collected two more international medals, winning bronze in the 100m and 200m events. Less than three months later Brown was part of Team GB, competing in the 2012 Summer Paralympics in London. She failed to qualify for the 200m, finishing fourth in her heat. In the 100m she came through the heat stages, and in the final finished sixth with a time of 13.67s.
