= Sophia Warner =

English athlete

Personal information
- Nationality: British
- Born: 23 May 1974 (age 52) Dorking, England
- Website: www.sophiawarner.com

Sport
- Country: Great Britain
- Sport: Athletics
- Event: T35 sprint
- Club: Worthing

Achievements and titles
- Paralympic finals: 2012
- Personal best(s): 100m sprint: 16.44s 200m sprint: 35.25s
Medal record
IPC World Championships
Silver medal – second place	2011 Christchurch	200m – T35
Bronze medal – third place	2011 Christchurch	100m – T35
IPC European Championships
Silver medal – second place	2012 Stadskanaal	100m – T35
Bronze medal – third place	2012 Stadskanaal	200m – T35

Sophia Warner (born 23 May 1974) is a Paralympian track and field athlete from England competing mainly in T35 sprint events. In 2012, she qualified for the 2012 Summer Paralympics, selected for the T35 100m and 200m sprint and is also part of the T35–38 women's relay team. In 2012, she became the commercial director of UK Athletics.

Warner was born in Dorking in England in 1974. Warner, who has cerebral palsy, began racing at the age of 19 when she was persuaded by friends to attend a sports training weekend in Sheffield. Warner began to take her running seriously while she was studying for her degree in Biomedical Science and Business Studies at Leicester University.

In June 2011 she competed in the IPC Athletics World Championships in Christchurch, New Zealand, winning the silver in the 200m and bronze in 100m sprints. She qualified for the 2012 Summer Paralympics running in the T35 100m and 200m sprint and the T35–38 women's relay team for Great Britain. Warner finished 4th in the T35 200m final, with a personal best time of 35.25. Warner was unable to qualify for earlier Paralympic Games as London 2012 was the first games to include the events in her classification.

In November 2016, Warner launched the Para Triathlon Superhero Series for disabled and non-disabled people to take part in triathlons together.

Warner is an Ambassador of The Children's Trust, the UK's leading charity for children with brain injury and neurodisability. She received specialist treatment as a child at the charity in the 1980s.
