= Tamira Slaby =

German Paralympic athlete

Personal information
- Nationality: Germany
- Born: 6 March 1992 (age 34) Essen, Germany

Sport
- Country: Germany
- Sport: Athletics
- Event: T38 sprint
- Coached by: Lothar Hess

Achievements and titles
- Paralympic finals: 2008; 2012
Medal record
IPC European Championships
Silver medal – second place	2012 Stadskanaal	100m – T38
Silver medal – second place	2012 Stadskanaal	200m – T38

Tamira Slaby (born 6 March 1992) is a Paralympian athlete from Germany competing mainly in T38 sprint events. She has competed in two Summer Paralympics, 2008 and 2012, and won silver medals in both the 100m and 200m in the 2012 European Championships.

== History ==
Slaby was born in Essen in Germany in 1992. Slaby, who has cerebral palsy, began racing at the age of 13 when she joined the athletics club TV Wattenscheid based in Bochum.
