= Amanda Reid =

Australian Paralympic swimmer and cyclist

Amanda Reid OAM
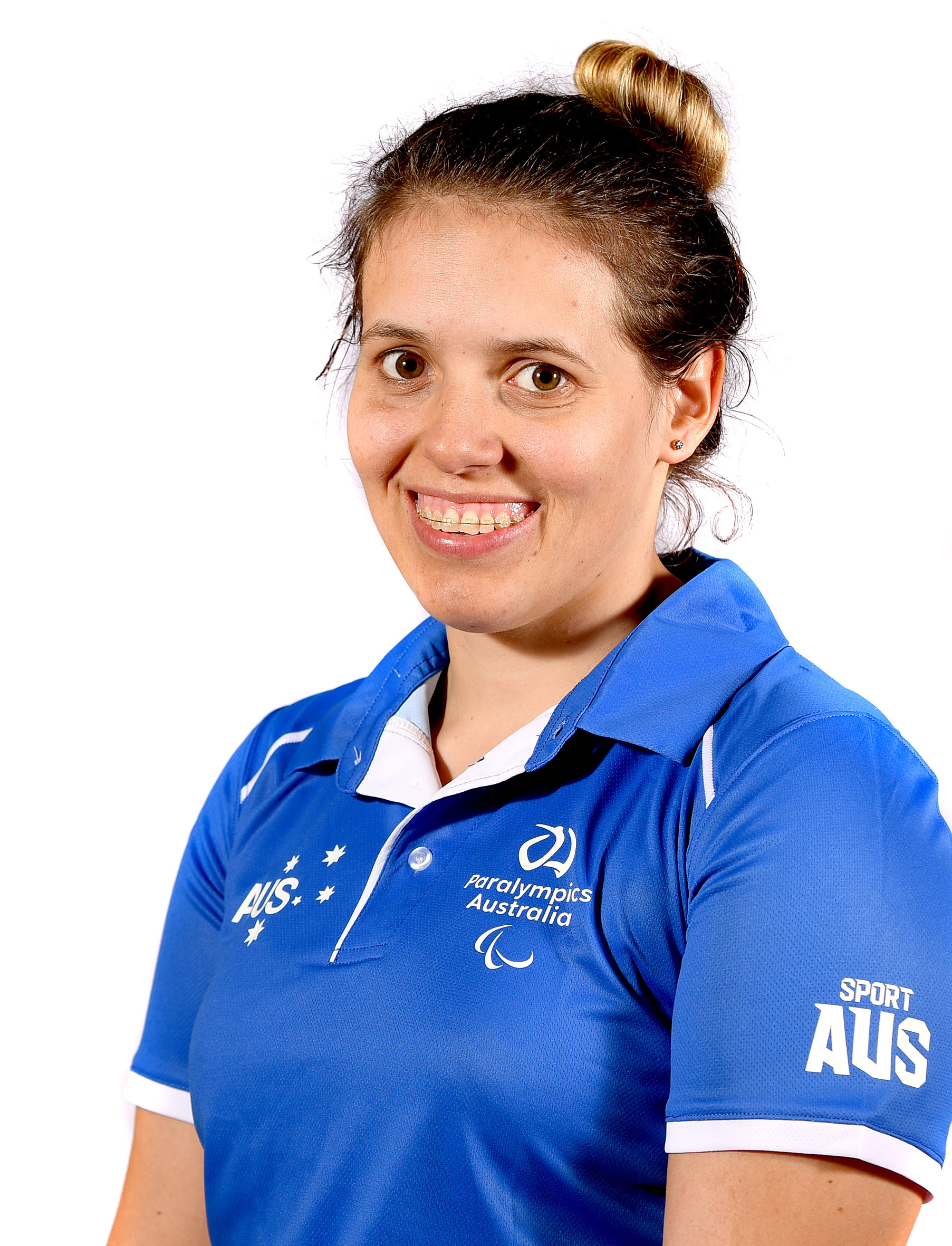
- Reid in 2019

Personal information
- Born: 12 November 1996 (age 30) Blaxland, New South Wales, Australia

Sport
- Country: Australia
- Sport: Para swimming; Para cycling; Para snowboarding
- Disability class: S14, SB14, SM14 and S8 (Swimming); C2 (Cycling); SB-LL1 (Snowboarding)
- Club: St George Cycling Club
Medal record
Women's para cycling
Representing Australia
Paralympic Games
Gold medal – first place	2024 Paris	500 m Time Trial C1–3
Gold medal – first place	2020 Tokyo	500 m Time Trial C1–3
Silver medal – second place	2016 Rio	500 m Time Trial C1–3
Track World Championships
Gold medal – first place	2017 Los Angeles	500 m time trial C2
Gold medal – first place	2017 Los Angeles	3 km individual pursuit trial C2
Gold medal – first place	2019 Apeldoorn	500 m time trial C2
Gold medal – first place	2020 Milton	500 m time trial C2
Gold medal – first place	2020 Milton	Omnium C2
Gold medal – first place	2022 Saint-Quentin-en-Yvelines	500 m time trial C2
Gold medal – first place	2022 Saint-Quentin-en-Yvelines	Omnium C2
Gold medal – first place	2022 Saint-Quentin-en-Yvelines	Scratch race C2
Gold medal – first place	2023 Glasgow	500 m time trial C2
Gold medal – first place	2023 Glasgow	Omnium C2
Gold medal – first place	2024 Rio de Janeiro	500 m time trial C2
Gold medal – first place	2024 Rio de Janeiro	Scratch race C1–C2
Silver medal – second place	2016 Montichiari	500 m time trial C2
Silver medal – second place	2017 Los Angeles	Scratch race C1–3
Silver medal – second place	2018 Rio	500 m time trial C2
Silver medal – second place	2019 Apeldoorn	Scratch race C1–C2
Silver medal – second place	2022 Saint-Quentin-en-Yvelines	Individual pursuit C2
Silver medal – second place	2023 Glasgow	Scratch race C2
Bronze medal – third place	2023 Glasgow	Individual pursuit C2
Para snowboarding
World Para Snowboard Championships
Gold medal – first place	2023 La Molina	Snowboard Cross SB-LL1
Bronze medal – third place	2023 La Molina	Snowboard Dual Banked SB-LL1

Amanda Reid OAM (formerly Fowler; born 12 November 1996) is an Australian Paralympic swimmer, cyclist and snowboarder. She represented Australia at the 2012 Summer Paralympics in swimming. At the 2016 Rio de Janeiro Paralympics, she won a silver medal in the Women's 500 m Time Trial C1–3 and at the 2020 Tokyo Paralympics a gold medal in the 500 m Time Trial C1–3. At the 2024 Paris Paralympics, she won a gold medal in the 500 m Time Trial C1–3 (defending her gold medal in Tokyo).

In 2023, she won a gold medal at the 2023 World Para Snowboard Championships and competed in snowboarding at the 2026 Winter Paralympics. She became Australia's first indigenous Winter Paralympian.

== Personal ==
Reid was born on 12 November 1996 with spastic quadriplegia and an intellectual disability. She is from the Blue Mountains town of Blaxland in New South Wales. She has heritage from the Wemba-Wemba and Guringai people. She attended Blaxland High School and Endeavour Sports High School. In 2026, she lives in Adelaide, South Australia.

== Career ==
=== Speed skating ===
At around the age of nine she won national titles in able-bodied short-track speed skating competitions, becoming the first person to win Australian, New Zealand, and all-Australian state titles for her age in one year.

=== Swimming ===
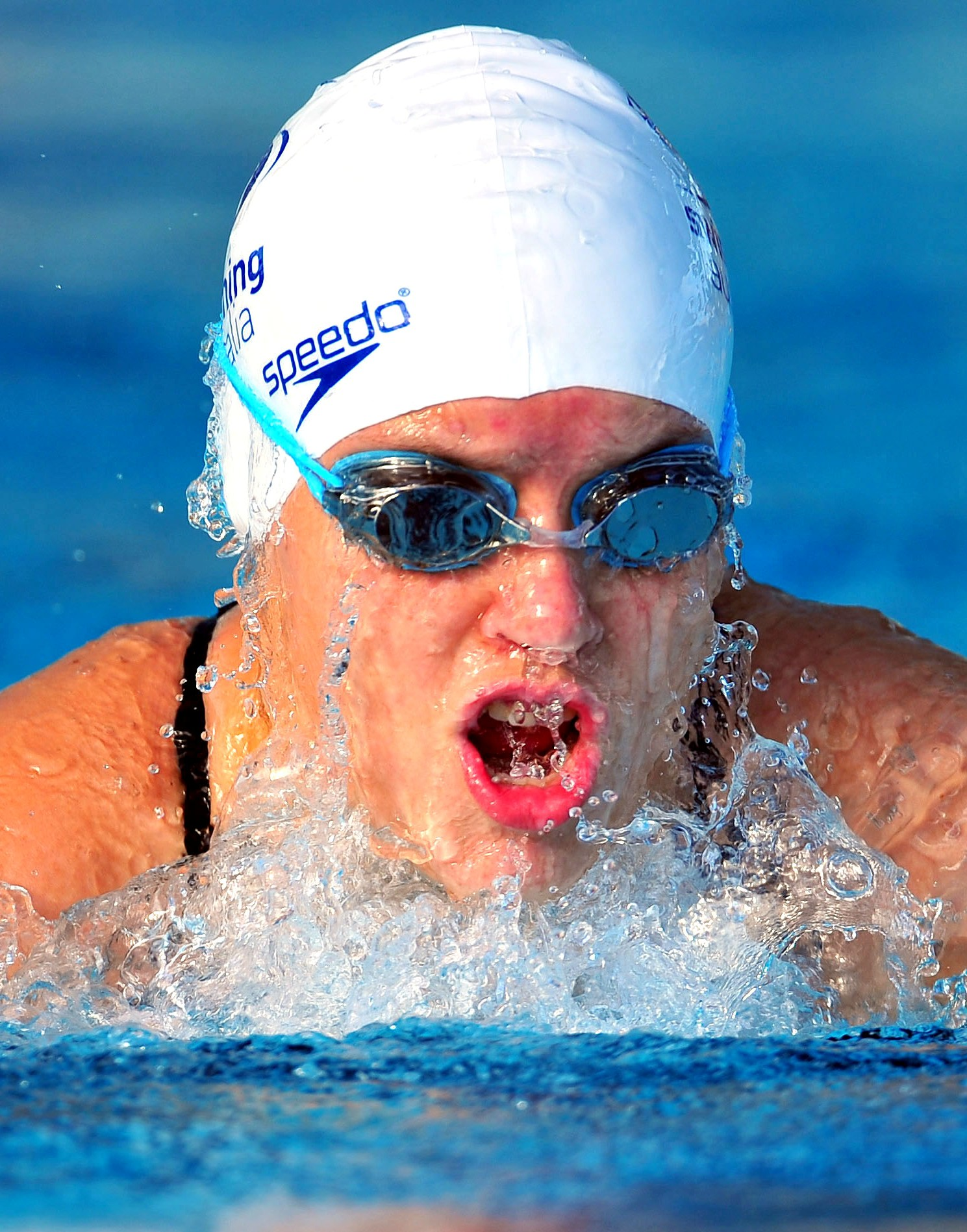
Fowler swimming at the 2011 Oceania Paralympic Championships

Reid (who competed as Amanda Fowler) was an S14 classified swimmer. She was classified as an S8 swimmer for the 2015 New South Wales Multi-Class Championships. She was a member of Woy Woy Swim club. At the 2010 Australian All Schools Swimming Championships, she won ten medals, eight of which were gold. She competed at the 2011 Global Games as a fourteen-year-old. She was selected to represent Australia at the 2012 Summer Paralympics in swimming competing in the S14 100-metre breaststroke event.

=== Cycling ===
After the 2012 London Paralympics, she changed her surname to Reid and transferred to cycling. At her first major international competition, she won a silver medal in the Women's C2 500 m Time Trial at the 2016 UCI Para-cycling Track World Championships in Montichiari, Italy.

At the 2016 Summer Paralympics, she won a silver medal in the Women's 500 m Time Trial C1–3. Her other results were 11th in both the Women's Road Time trial C1–3 and Women's Road Race C1-3.

In 2016, she was a New South Wales Institute of Sport scholarship holder.

At the 2017 UCI Para-cycling Track World Championships in Los Angeles, Reid won gold medals in the Women's 500 m Time Trial C2 and Women's 3 km Individual Pursuit C2 and a silver medal in the Women's Scratch Race C1–3.

At the 2018 UCI Para-cycling Track World Championships in Rio de Janeiro, she won the silver medal in the Women's 500 m Time Trial C2.

At the 2019 UCI Para-cycling Track World Championships in Apeldoorn, Netherlands, Reid won the gold medal in the Women's 500 m Time Trial C2 in a new world record time of 39.505 seconds and a silver medal in the Women's Scratch Race C1–C2.

At the 2020 UCI Para-cycling Track World Championships in Milton, Ontario, she won two gold medals – Women's Time Trial C2 and Women's Omnium C2.

Reid won her first Paralympic gold medal in the Women's 500 m Time Trial C1-3 at the 2020 Tokyo Paralympics in a world record time of 35.581. She also competed in the Mixed team sprint C1-5 together with Meg Lemon and Gordon Allan. The team came ninth.

At the 2022 UCI Para-cycling Road World Championships in Baie-Comeau, Reid finished fourth in The Women's Time Trial C2 and did not finish the Women's Road Race C2.

At the 2022 UCI Para-cycling Track World Championships in Saint-Quentin-en-Yvelines, France, she won the gold medals in the Women's Time Trial C2, Women's Omnium C2, and Women's Scratch Race C2, along with a silver medal in the Women's Individual Pursuit C2. At the 2023 UCI Para-cycling Track World Championships in Glasgow, Scotland, she won the gold medals in the 500 m Time Trial C2 and the Omnium C2, a silver medal in the Scratch Race C2, and a bronze medal in the Women's Individual Pursuit C2.

At the 2024 UCI Para-cycling Track World Championships in Rio de Janeiro, she won gold medals in the 500 m time trial C2 (her fifth win in a row in this event at the championships) and the scratch race C1–C2.

At the 2024 Paris Paralympics, she won a gold medal in the 500 m Time Trial C1–3 (defending her gold medal in Tokyo) with a facgtored time of 36.676 seconds. Reid finished 13th in two road races.

=== Snowboarding ===
Reid took up snowboarding in 2018. She won the gold medal in the Women's Snowboard Cross SB-LL1 and the bronze medal in the Women's Snowboard Dual Banked SB-LL1 at the 2023 World Para Snowboard Championships held at La Molina. At the 2026 Winter Paralympics, she fell and did not finish in the quarter-final of the Women's Snowboard Cross SB-LL1. Her injuries prevented her from competing in the Women's Snowboard Banked.

=== Controversy ===
In 2018, it was reported that Reid's former coach Simon Watkins accused her of exaggerating her physical and intellectual conditions and symptoms. The Australian Paralympic Committee dismissed these allegations, describing them as "opinion" by a non-medical professional, saying that she had been through "rigorous assessment processes" and that it was "not uncommon to change classifications".

== Recognition ==
- 2017 – NAIDOC Sports Person of the year
- 2017 – New South Wales Athlete with a Disability
- 2017 – Australia Day Ambassador for the Dubbo Regional Council
- 2017 – Sport Australia Hall of Fame Scholarship
- 2022 – Medal of the Order of Australia for service to sport as a gold medallist at the Tokyo Paralympic Games 2020
- 2023 – Snow Australia Paralympic Female Athlete of the Year
- 2023 – National Sportsperson with a Disability of the Year at National Indigenous Sporting Awards
- 2023 – AusCycling Cyclist of the Year – Sir Hubert Opperman Trophy and Oppy Medal and AusCycling Women’s Track Para-cyclist of the Year
- 2024 – National Sportsperson with a Disability of the Year at National Indigenous Sporting Awards
