= Caitlin Ward =

Australian cyclist (born 1994)

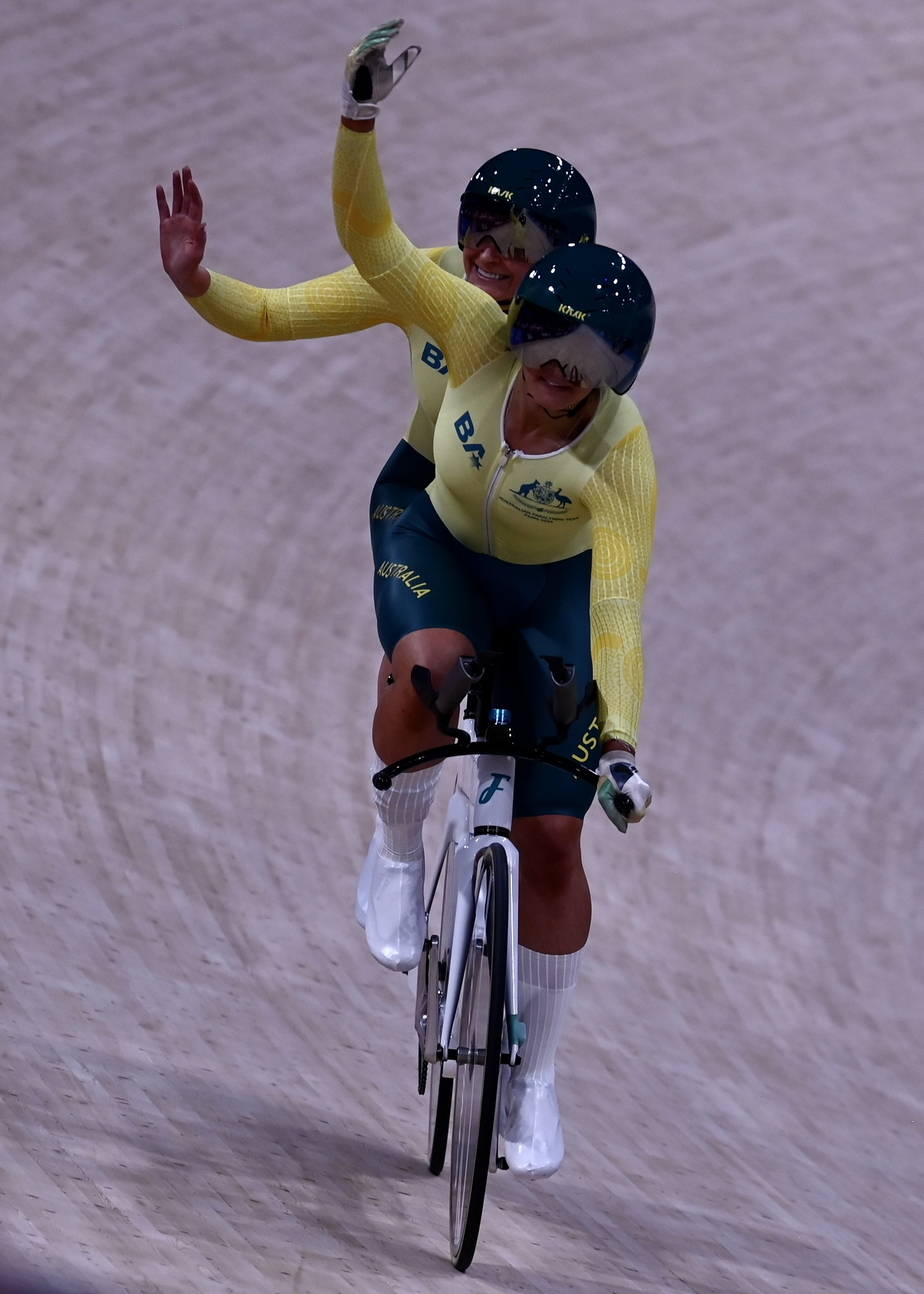
- Ward at the 2024 Summer Paralympics

Personal information
- Born: 1 February 1994 (age 32) Frankston, Victoria, Australia
Medal record
Representing Australia
Women's para track cycling
Paralympic Games
Silver medal – second place	2024 Paris	Time trial B
Track World Championships
Gold medal – first place	2026 Apeldoorn	Sprint C5
Gold medal – first place	2026 Apeldoorn	Mixed team sprint C1–5
Silver medal – second place	2023 Glasgow	Tandem time trial B
Silver medal – second place	2023 Glasgow	Tandem sprint B
Bronze medal – third place	2024 Rio de Janeiro	Time trial C1
Bronze medal – third place	2024 Rio de Janeiro	Tandem sprint B
Bronze medal – third place	2026 Apeldoorn	Time trial C5
Commonwealth Games
Gold medal – first place	2022 Birmingham	Tandem sprint B
Gold medal – first place	2022 Birmingham	Tandem time trial B

Caitlin Ward (born 1 February 1994) is an Australian track cyclist who competed at the 2024 Summer Paralympics.

== Personal life ==
Caitlin Ward was born in Frankston, Victoria, on 1 February 1994. She has a master's degree in Physiotherapy from Flinders University in Adelaide. She runs track sessions for AusCycling in South Australia and co-owns JKT Coaching.

== Cycling career ==
Ward became interested in cycling after participating in the Around the Bay in a Day in 2005 and the Great Victorian Bike Ride in 2006 when she was in the fifth grade at primary school.

She was sidelined between 2015 and 2018 with a series of injuries including glandular fever and a broken ankle after a gym accident in which it was crushed by a 250 kilogram leg press, but she came back to win the women's sprint and keirin at the Australian national titles in 2019. She represented Australia at the 2019–20 UCI Track Cycling World Cup in Brisbane but missed out on selection for the 2020 Tokyo Olympics.

In 2022, Ward became the sighted pilot for blind Paralympian Jessica Gallagher at the Commonwealth Games in Birmingham, where they won gold in the tandem B sprint and tandem time trial B at London's Lee Valley VeloPark. At the 2023 UCI Para-cycling Track World Championships in Glasgow the following year they won silver medals in both events. At the 2024 UCI Para-cycling Track World Championships in March 2024, they won bronze in the tandem B Sprint and the 1 km time trial.

Ward was selected as pilot for Gallager at the 2024 Summer Paralympics in Paris, where they won silver in the Women's B 1000m Time Trial.

Caitlin was classified as a c5 cyclist due to the chronic injury to her lower limb from the leg press accident in 2016, with her first National race in 2024, making Caitlin the first pilot in history to be a nationally classified athlete herself. Caitlin transitioned off the tandem after Paris 2024 and was selected for her first World Championships as a c5 cyclist in 2026.
