= Ellie Stone =

Scottish track cyclist

Personal information
- Born: 10 February 2001 (age 25) Ferness, Scotland

Cycling career
- Sport: Cycling
- Current team: Glasgow Track Racing Club
- Discipline: Track cycling
- Role: Rider
- Rider type: Sprinter

Amateur teams
- 2019–2025: Black Line
- 2025–: Glasgow Track Racing Club

Major wins
- British national titles Keirin (2022); 500 m time trial (2022) 1 km time trial (2026)
Medal record
Women's track cycling
Representing Scotland
Commonwealth Games
Silver medal – second place	2022 Birmingham	Tandem sprint B
Bronze medal – third place	2022 Birmingham	Tandem 1 km time trial B

Ellie Stone (born 10 February 2001) is a Scottish track cyclist who competes in sprint, keirin and time trial events. She has represented Great Britain in UCI competition and Scotland at the Commonwealth Games. Stone is a three-time senior British national champion and won two medals as pilot to Aileen McGlynn at the 2022 Commonwealth Games.

== Cycling career ==
Stone competed in athletics before moving to track cycling in 2019. She joined the Scottish Cycling Performance Development Programme in June that year and won British junior titles in the sprint, keirin and 500 m time trial.

At the 2022 British National Track Championships, Stone won the women's keirin and 500 m time trial, her first senior British titles. She also won bronze in the team sprint. She was subsequently selected for the Glasgow round of the UCI Track Cycling Nations Cup, making her debut at that level for Great Britain.

Stone represented Scotland at the 2022 Commonwealth Games as the sighted pilot for McGlynn. The pair won silver in the women's tandem B sprint and bronze in the tandem B 1 km time trial.

In 2023, Stone competed in the five-round UCI Track Champions League, finishing 17th in the women's sprint standings. She also won team sprint bronze at the British National Track Championships with Lauren Bell and Iona Moir.

Stone has also won several Scottish national titles, including the sprint, 1 km time trial and team sprint in 2025.

In January 2026, Stone won the British women's 1 km time trial title in 1:06.750, setting a Scottish record. She won team sprint bronze at the British National Track Championships the following month with Madeleine Silcock and Sylvia Misztal. Stone was also selected to represent Scotland in the women's sprint, keirin and 1 km time trial at the 2026 Commonwealth Games.

== Coaching ==
Stone is an athletic coach at Shettleston Harriers in Glasgow.

== Major results ==
2026
British National 1 km Time Trial Championships

1st, 1 km time trial

British National Track Championships

3rd, team sprint, with Madeleine Silcock and Sylvia Misztal

2023
British National Track Championships

3rd, team sprint, with Lauren Bell and Iona Moir

UCI Track Champions League

17th overall, women's sprint standings

2022
2022 British National Track Championships

1st, keirin
1st, 500 m time trial
3rd, team sprint

Commonwealth Games

Tandem B sprint, piloting Aileen McGlynn
Tandem B 1 km time trial, piloting Aileen McGlynn

2020
British National Track Championships

3rd, 500 m time trial
3rd, team sprint, with Lauren Bell

2019
British National Youth and Junior Track Championships

1st, sprint
1st, keirin
1st, 500 m time trial
