= Cycling at the 2024 Summer Paralympics – Women's time trial =

The women's time trial track cycling events at the 2024 Summer Paralympics will take place between August 29 to 1 September 2024 at the Vélodrome National, Paris. Three events will take place in the women's event also over six classifications. Two of the races will be factored races for multiple classifications; the third will be for visual impairment only. The race distance shall be 500m in the C events, and 1000m in the B event.

== Classification ==
Cyclists are given a classification depending on the type and extent of their disability. The classification system allows cyclists to compete against others with a similar level of function. The class number indicates the severity of impairment with "1" being most impaired.

Cycling classes are:

- B: Blind and visually impaired cyclists use a Tandem bicycle with a sighted pilot on the front
- C 1-5: Cyclists with an impairment that affects their legs, arms, and/or trunk but are capable of using a standard bicycle

== Medal table ==
* Host nation (France)

Rank	NPC	Gold	Silver	Bronze	Total
1	Australia	1	1	0	2
2	Great Britain	1	0	1	2
3	Netherlands	1	0	0	1
4	China	0	1	0	1
4	France*	0	1	0	1
6	Canada	0	0	1	1
6	Germany	0	0	1	1
Totals (7 entries)		3	3	3	9

== Medal summary ==
Classification	Gold		Silver		Bronze	
B	Elizabeth Jordan piloted by Dannielle Khan; Great Britain	1:06.976	Jessica Gallagher piloted by Caitlin Ward; Australia	1:07.533	Sophie Unwin piloted by Jenny Holl; Great Britain	1:07.879
C1-3	Amanda Reid; Australia	36.676; 38.811	Qian Wangwei; China	37.616; 40.878	Maike Hausberger; Germany	38.358; 40.591
C4-5	Caroline Groot; Netherlands	35.566; 35.566	Marie Patouillet; France	36.700; 36.700	Kate O'Brien; Canada	36.873; 37.370

Italicised times are the recorded finish times. The times which determine the final standings and medals are factored times, which are calculated according to each cyclist's disability classification.
