= Athletics at the 2008 Summer Paralympics – Women's long jump F42 =

Women's Long Jump F42 at the XIII Paralympic Games
- Venue: Beijing National Stadium
- Dates: 8 September
- Competitors: 8 from 7 nations
- Winning distance: 3.73

Medalists
1st place, gold medalist(s)		Christine Wolf	Australia
2nd place, silver medalist(s)		Annette Roozen	Netherlands
3rd place, bronze medalist(s)		Ewa Zielinska	Poland

The women's long jump F42 event at the 2008 Summer Paralympics took place at the Beijing National Stadium at 18:00 on 8 September. There was a single round of competition, and as there were only 8 competitors they each had 6 jumps. The competition was won by Christine Wolf, representing Australia.

== Results ==
Rank	Athlete	Nationality	1	2	3	4	5	6	Best	Notes
1st place, gold medalist(s)	Christine Wolf	Australia	3.59	3.65	3.57	3.61	3.73	3.66	3.73	WR
2nd place, silver medalist(s)	Annette Roozen	Netherlands	3.23	3.63	3.56	x	x	3.43	3.63	SB
3rd place, bronze medalist(s)	Ewa Zielinska	Poland	3.60	3.62	3.56	3.50	3.43	3.54	3.62	SB
4	Perla Bustamante	Mexico	3.44	3.51	3.44	3.41	3.51	3.17	3.51	SB
5	Zhang Haiyuan	China	3.35	2.88	3.44	x	x	3.31	3.44	
6	Marije Smits	Netherlands	x	x	3.32	3.39	3.29	3.24	3.39	
7	Elin Holen	Norway	3.09	3.25	x	3.38	3.26	3.15	3.38	
8	Claudia Biene	Germany	2.25	2.57	1.72	2.78	2.32	1.96	2.78	

WR = World Record. SB = Seasonal Best.
