= Chris Clarke (sprinter) =

English sprinter (born 1990)

Christopher Clarke MBE
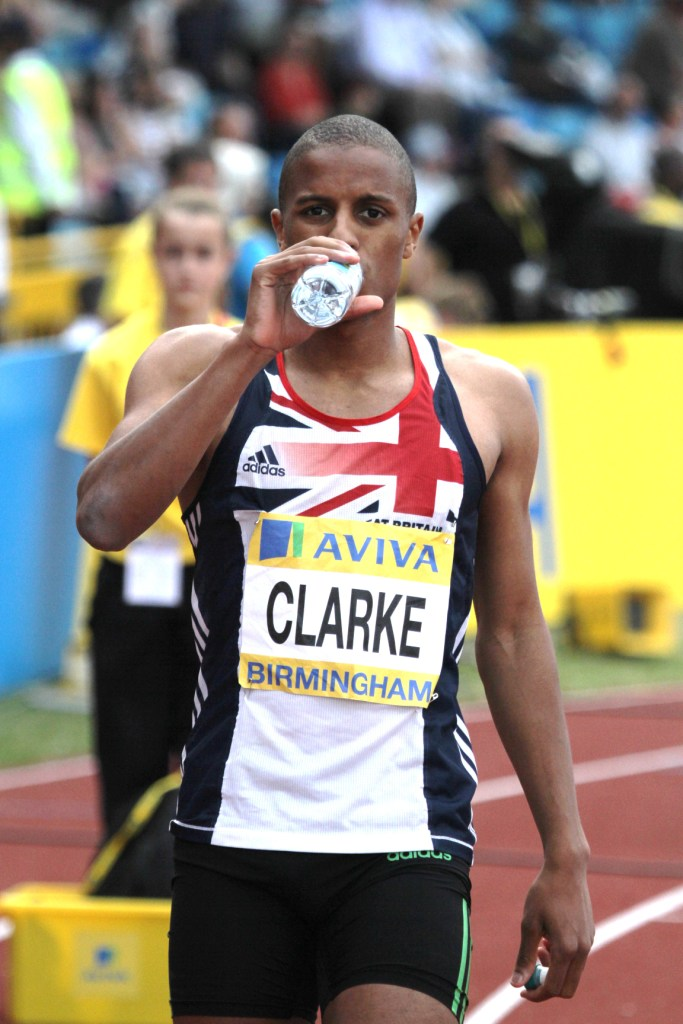
- Christopher Clarke MBE

Personal information
- Nationality: British (English)
- Born: 25 January 1990 (age 36) London, England
- Height: 1.78 m (5 ft 10 in)
- Weight: 67 kg (148 lb)

Sport
- Sport: Athletics
- Events: 200 metres, 400 metres
- Club: Marshall Milton Keynes A.C

Achievements and titles
- Personal bests: 100 m – 10.45 (2007); 200 m – 20.22 (2013); 400 m – 45.59 (2009)
Medal record
Representing Great Britain
World Indoor Championships
Bronze medal – third place	2010 Doha	4 × 400 m relay
European Junior Championships
Gold medal – first place	2009 Novi Sad	400 m
Gold medal – first place	2009 Novi Sad	4 × 400 m relay
World Youth Championships
Gold medal – first place	2007 Ostrava	400 m
World Junior Athletics Championships
Bronze medal – third place	2006 Beijing	4 × 400 m relay
Para-athletics
Paralympic Games
Gold medal – first place	2016 Rio	W 100 m T11
Gold medal – first place	2016 Rio	W 200 m T11
Silver medal – second place	2020 Tokyo	Mixed 4 × 100 m relay

Christopher Clarke MBE (born 25 January 1990) is an English former athlete who represented Great Britain and Northern Ireland in sprinting events. At the club level, he represented Marshall Milton Keynes AC and Newham and Essex Beagles.

== Biography ==
At the 2006 Beijing World Junior Athletics Championships, Clarke won a bronze medal in the 4 × 400 metres relay. In 2007 he finished first in the 400 metres final of the World Youth Championships, winning the gold medal. On 24 July 2009 he won two gold medals (400 m and 4 × 400 m) at the European Junior Championships in a new personal best for the 400 m of 45.59 seconds. Clarke was selected for his first Senior Great Britain national team for the 2009 World Athletics championships in Berlin.

In 2010, Clarke competed as part of the bronze-medal-winning 4 × 400 m relay team at the world indoor athletics championships in Doha. In 2011, Clarke returned from injury to finish second at the British Championships and qualify for the World Athletics Championships. The Great Britain relay team qualified for the final in 3:00.38 (Clarke ran 44.99 for his leg). The team placed seventh in the final with a time of 3:01.16.

In 2012, Clarke finished third in the 200 m at the British Athletics Championships. He went on to represent Great Britain at the European championships later that year, finishing sixth in the final. He missed qualification for the 2012 Summer Olympics. In 2013, Clarke ran two personal bests in the 200 m to finish second in the national senior ranking with 20.22.

In 2014, Clarke reached the semi-final of the men's 200 m at the Commonwealth Games held in Glasgow. In February 2016, Clarke began competing as a guide runner with Paralympic silver medalist Libby Clegg. They won the gold medal in the 100 m – T11 and 200 m – T11 events at the Rio Paralympics.

Clarke was appointed Member of the Order of the British Empire (MBE) in the 2017 New Year Honours for services to sport.

In 2021, Clarke won a silver medal at the 2020 Tokyo Paralympics in the Mixed 4 x 100m relay, again as a guide runner for Clegg.
