= Athletics at the 2016 Summer Paralympics – Women's 100 metres T11 =

Event at the 2016 Summer Paralympics

Women's 100 metres T11 at the XV Paralympic Games
- Venue: Rio Olympic Stadium
- Dates: 8 and 9 September
- Competitors: 16
- Winning time: 11.96

Medalists
1st place, gold medalist(s)		Libby Clegg; Chris Clarke	Great Britain
2nd place, silver medalist(s)		Zhou Guohua; Jia Dengpu	China
3rd place, bronze medalist(s)		Liu Cuiqing; Xu Donglin	China

The Women's 100 metres T11 event at the 2016 Summer Paralympics took place at the Estádio Olímpico João Havelange between 8 and 9 September. It featured 16 athletes from 11 countries.

The T11 category is for athletes with a visual impairment. A T11 athlete may be entirely without sight, or be able to perceive light, but have no ability to see the shape of a hand at any distance. T11 athletes commonly run with guides.

The event was won by Great Britain's Libby Clegg, guided by Chris Clarke. Having run a world record for the classification in the semi-final, Clegg was initially disqualified for having obtained illegal assistance from her guide runner. Upon her appeal, with her final place and world record reinstated, Clegg eased away from the Chinese pair of Zhou Guohua and Liu Cuiqing to take the gold medal. The fourth finalist, double gold medalist and home favourite Terezinha Guilhermina was disqualified for illegal assistance.

== Results ==
=== Heats ===
Qualification rule: Winners of each heat (Q) and the next four fastest (q) qualify for the semifinals.

==== Heat 1 ====
Rank	Athlete	Nationality	Time	Notes
1	Lorena Salvatini Spoladore; Guide: Renato Ben Hur Oliveira	Brazil	12.49	Q
2	Jia Juntingxian; Guide: Shi Yang	China	12.58	q
3	Sonia Sirley Luna Rodriguez; Guide: Wilmar Cabrera Estremor	Colombia	13.34	PB
4	Lia Beel Quintana; Guide: David Alonso Gutierrez	Spain	13.99	
			Wind: –0.6 m/s	

=== Heat 2 ===
Rank	Athlete	Nationality	Time	Notes
1	Zhou Guohua; Guide: Jia Dengpu	China	12.17	Q
1	Libby Clegg; Guide: Chris Clarke	Great Britain	12.17	Q
3	Brigitte Diasso Fatimata; Guide: N'guessan Gohore Bi	Ivory Coast	13.10	
4	Ronja Oja; Guide: Jesper Oja	Finland	13.39	NR
			Wind: +0.6 m/s	

=== Heat 3 ===
Rank	Athlete	Nationality	Time	Notes
1	Liu Cuiqing; Guide: Xu Donglin	China	12.03	Q
2	Terezinha Guilhermina; Guide: Rafael Lazarini	Brazil	12.19	q
3	Arjola Dedaj; Guide: Elisa Bettini	Italy	13.43	
4	Chiaki Takada; Guide: Shigekazu Omori	Japan	13.48	
			Wind: –0.1 m/s	

=== Heat 4 ===
Rank	Athlete	Nationality	Time	Notes
1	Jerusa Geber Santos; Guide: Guilherme Soares de Santana	Brazil	12.34	Q
2	Lahja Ishitile; Guide: David Ndeilenga	Namibia	12.59	q
3	Esperanca Gicasso; Guide: Antonio Dias Baptista Alaine	Angola	12.61	
4	Lovina Onyegbule; Guide: Chidozie Kalu	Nigeria	12.70	
			Wind: m/s	

== Semifinals ==
Qualification rule: The winner of each heat (Q) and the next two fastest (q) qualify for the final.

=== Semifinal 1 ===
Rank	Athlete	Nationality	Time	Notes
1	Liu Cuiqing; Guide: Xu Donglin	China	11.96	Q, WR
2	Jerusa Geber Santos; Guide: Guilherme Soares de Santana	Brazil	12.23	
3	Lorena Salvatini Spoladore; Guide: Renato Ben Hur Oliveira	Brazil	12.38	
4	Lahja Ishitile; Guide: David Ndeilenga	Namibia	12.45	AR
			Wind: +0.1 m/s	

=== Heat 2 ===
Rank	Athlete	Nationality	Time	Notes
1	Libby Clegg; Guide: Chris Clarke	Great Britain	11.91	Q, WR^{[1]}
2	Zhou Guohua; Guide: Jia Dengpu	China	12.08	q
3	Terezinha Guilhermina; Guide: Rafael Lazarini	Brazil	12.10	q
4	Jia Juntingxian; Guide: Shi Yang	China	12.56	
			Wind: +0.7 m/s	

==== Notes ====
- ^{^{1}} Libby Clegg was initially disqualified for illegal assistance from her guide Chris Clarke, but was reinstated upon appeal, and her world record restored.

=== Final ===
Rank	Athlete	Nationality	Time	Notes
1st place, gold medalist(s)	Libby Clegg; Guide: Chris Clarke	Great Britain	11.96	
2nd place, silver medalist(s)	Zhou Guohua; Guide: Jia Dengpu	China	11.98	
3rd place, bronze medalist(s)	Liu Cuiqing; Guide: Xu Donglin	China	12.07	
–	Terezinha Guilhermina; Guide: Rafael Lazarini	Brazil	DQ	R7.10
			Wind: m/s	
