= The Children's Trust =

British charity for children with brain injuries

The children's trust logo

The Children's Trust is the UK's leading charity for children with brain injury.

The Children's Trust is a UK registered charity, number 288018. The Children's Trust runs a range of specialist care, education and therapy services for children and young people from across the UK, including the UK's largest rehabilitation centre for children with acquired brain injury (ABI) and is based at Tadworth Court, Tadworth, Surrey within the M25 motorway.

The Children's Trust's celebrity Ambassadors are Phil Tufnell, Joely Richardson, Adam Hills, Jenni Falconer, Elaine Paige, Sophia Warner and Nicholas Owen.

The Children's Trust launched an online support centre in 2012 for families of children affected by acquired brain injury. This website offers practical advice and information about a condition that is often misunderstood. There is also an online forum giving families the opportunity to share their stories and experiences.

In May 2022 a coroner criticised The Children's Trust over the death of a five-year-old boy its care. An inquest concluded Connor Wellsted died in 2017 following "entrapment by a loose cot bumper" at the Children's Trust facility in Tadworth, Surrey. Coroner Dr Karen Henderson also criticised the trust for what she said was a "lack of transparency" over the death. Two years later, on 14 October 2024 and following the death of another child, Mia Gauci-Lamport, the same coroner raised concerns in relation to the lack of appropriate monitoring of the child over-night, the medical care she received and senior management at the Trust. She highlighted that the management issues had been raised previously in her report into the death of Connor Wellsted.

In December 2024, England's Health Ombudsman, Karen Hilsenrath raised concerns publicly that the regulatory body, The Care Quality Commission, had not properly investigated allegations of a 'cover-up' by The Children's Trust in the circumstances of the death of the child in 2017. She highlighted the coroner's statement in her report that The Trust "have not acknowledged there was a lack of transparency and openness into how [the boy] died or that the trust did not properly investigate his death or inform the relevant statutory bodies of the circumstances of his death."

== Services ==
The Children's Trust's services include:

- Residential rehabilitation for children with an acquired brain injury
- Therapy-led support in the community for children with an acquired brain injury
- Special education for pupils with profound and multiple learning difficulties, or PMLD, at The Children's Trust School, Tadworth
- Residential short breaks
- Transitional care for children who are technology dependent (e.g. require long-term ventilation or have a tracheostomy)
- Palliative care
- The Brain Injury Hub (www.braininjuryhub.co.uk) is an information website and discussion forum for parents of children with acquired brain injury, teachers, and health professionals.

== Awards ==
Awards won by The Children's Trust include:

- Quality Improvement Award (Top Hospitals 2019)
- Institute of Fundraising Best use of data and insight in a small to medium charity (Insight in Fundraising Awards 2019)
- Highly Commended, 2019 BMA Patient Information Awards for Brain Injury Community Service animation and leaflet.
- Highly Commended, 2019 BMA Patient Information Awards, Concussion in children and young people booklet
- Winner 2018 BMA Patient Information Awards User Engagement Award
- Charity Shop of the Year (Charity Retail Awards)

== History ==
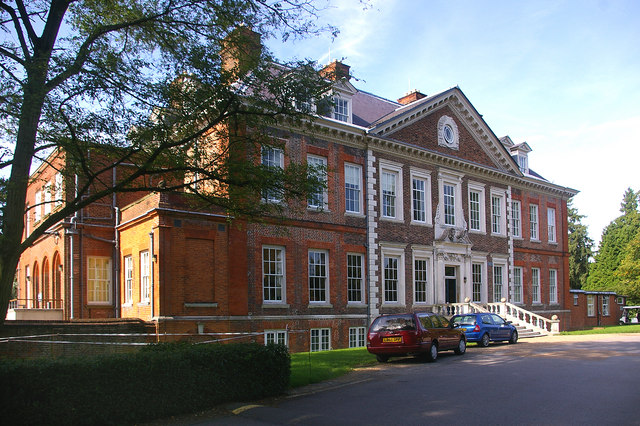
Tadworth Court

From 1927 until 1983, Tadworth Court was the country branch of Great Ormond Street Hospital. In 1984, the Department of Health transferred management control to the newly created charity, The Children's Trust.

Tadworth Court was the manor house of the manor of Tadworth which lay within the parish of Banstead, by Banstead Downs, a horse-racing racecourse in the 17th century. Banstead was well known as an airing place at this period, where Londoners sought fresh air, being 600 feet above sea level. The attractions of Epsom Spa to the west prompted the first settlements other than isolated farmhouses on this part of the widest section of the North Downs stretching from Banstead village to Walton-on-the-Hill to the south.

Tadworth Court on the south of the site is a listed building for architecture in the highest category as a country house of circa 1700, with "rustic quoins, stone dressings (renderings)..steep (and richly decorated) pediment....high panelling and rococo plasterwork...Boxed room with early C10 panelling." Nikolaus Pevsner described it as a "splendid house" and "one of the most elegant in the whole country". He was amazed that such a house so close to London was virtually unknown – no pictures of the house are known before the 20th century.

The owners of the house: The first owner, Leonard Wessel, a merchant, purchased the estate in 1694. He was Sheriff of the County in 1700 and a Member of Parliament in 1701. Whilst of a Dutch family, his great grandfather was born in England in 1557. Recent work to the house revealed that it does not incorporate an earlier building, but in common with all buildings of this period contains some reused beams due to the growing shortage of timber. 1694 is the likely construction date of the house and by 1698 the Banstead Court Rolls record that Wessel applied for leave "to plant rows of trees on the Heath, fronting his dwelling house and leading towards the Warren." One of these, a large poplar, survived until the 19th century.

Wessel died in 1708. The house appears on contemporary maps, and Celia Fiennes in 1712 describes it as one of "several good houses in or about Epsham", though by then in the possession of Sir Thomas Scawen, Alderman of London, his brother-in-law.
