= Libby Clegg =

Scottish Paralympic sprinter (born 1990)

Libby Clegg MBE
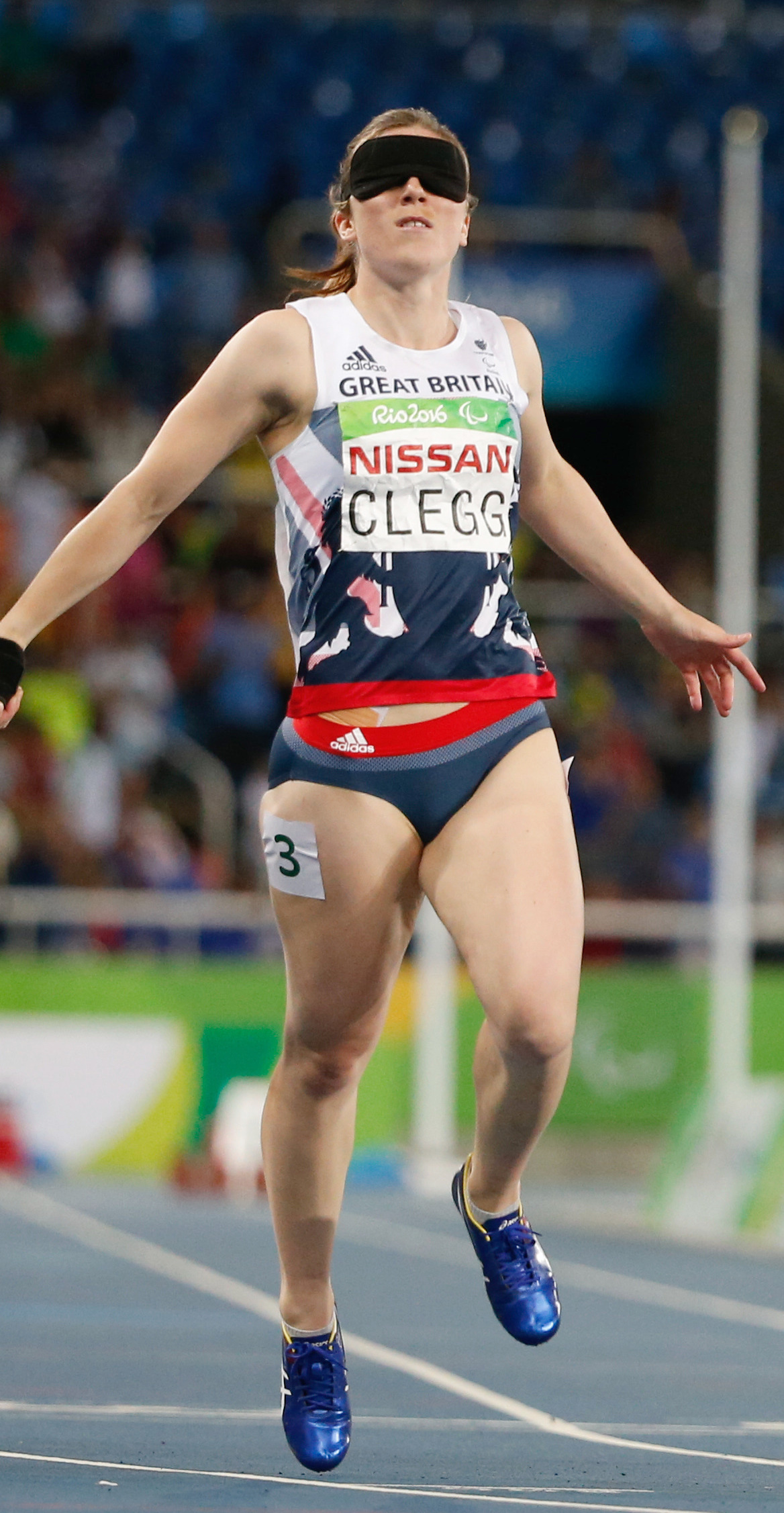
- Clegg at the 2016 Paralympics

Personal information
- Full name: Elizabeth Gemma Clegg
- Nationality: British
- Born: 24 March 1990 (age 36) Stockport, Greater Manchester England

Sport
- Country: Great Britain
- Sport: Paralympic athletics
- Disability class: T11
- Events: T11 100m T11 200m
- Coached by: Joseph McDonell
Medal record
Women's para athletics
Representing Great Britain
Event	1st	2nd	3rd
Paralympic Games	2	3	0
World Championships	1	3	1
IPC European Championships	3	0	0
Commonwealth Games	1	0	0
Total	7	6	1
Summer Paralympic Games
Silver medal – second place	2008 Beijing	100 m T12
Silver medal – second place	2012 London	100 m T12
Gold medal – first place	2016 Rio	100 m T11
Gold medal – first place	2016 Rio	200 m T11
Silver medal – second place	2020 Tokyo	Mixed 4 × 100 m relay
IPC World Championships
Gold medal – first place	2011 Christchurch	100 m T12
Silver medal – second place	2006 Assen	200 m T12
Silver medal – second place	2013 Lyon	100 m T12
Silver medal – second place	2013 Lyon	200 m T12
Bronze medal – third place	2011 Christchurch	200 m T12
World Games
Gold medal – first place	2011 Antalya	200 m T12
Silver medal – second place	2011 Antalya	100 m T12
World Cup
Gold medal – first place	2009 Manchester	100 m T12
Gold medal – first place	2010 Manchester	100 m T12
Silver medal – second place	2011 Manchester	200 m T12
Silver medal – second place	2012 Manchester	200 m T12
Bronze medal – third place	2009 Manchester	200 m T12
Bronze medal – third place	2011 Manchester	100 m T12
IPC European Championships
Gold medal – first place	2012 Stadskanaal	100 m T12
Gold medal – first place	2012 Stadskanaal	200 m T12
Gold medal – first place	2021 Bydgoszcz	200 m T12
Representing Scotland
Commonwealth Games
Gold medal – first place	2014 Glasgow	100 m T12
Women's Para-cycling
Representing Great Britain
Track World Championships
Gold medal – first place	2022 Saint-Quentin-en-Yvelines	Team sprint B

Elizabeth Gemma Clegg (born 24 March 1990) is a British Paralympic sprinter and tandem track cyclist who has represented both Scotland and Great Britain at international events. She represented Great Britain in the T12 100m and 200m at the 2008 Summer Paralympics, winning a silver medal in the T12 100m race. She won Gold in Rio at the 2016 Paralympic Games in 100m T11 where she broke the world record and T11 200m, beating the previous Paralympic record in the process, thus making her a double Paralympic champion.

== Early life ==
Clegg was born in Stockport in Greater Manchester, before moving to Newcastleton in the Scottish Borders. She attended the Royal Blind School in Edinburgh.

== Athletics career ==
Clegg has a deteriorating eye condition known as Stargardt's Macular Dystrophy disease giving her only slight peripheral vision in her left eye – she is registered blind. Clegg runs with the aid of guide runner Chris Clarke.

She took up athletics aged 9, joining Macclesfield Harriers AC. She originally tried middle-distance running and cross country before starting sprinting.

In 2006, she competed at the IPC World Championships, winning a silver medal in the T12 200 metres. This was followed by an appearance at the 2008 Summer Olympics, where she won a silver medal in the 100 metres. From 2006 until 2010 her guide runner was Lincoln Asquith.

In January 2011, she competed in the IPC World Championships. Whilst there she took a bronze in the 200m. Clegg is a Paralympic silver medallist and current World Champion in the T12 100m and 200m sprints. She was one of the major success stories from the 2011 IPC World Championships in New Zealand and IBSA World Championships in Turkey.

In June 2012, Clegg won the 100m and 200m at the IPC Athletics European Championships.

Clegg won silver at the London Paralympics on 2 September 2012 in the T12 100m. Clegg and guide Mikail Huggins broke the European record in the final.

In October 2012, Clegg won "Para Athlete of the Year" at the Scottish Athletics awards and was presented with her award by fellow GB Paralympian David Weir. She won the award again in October 2013.

In 2013, Clegg won double silver at the IPC World Championships in Lyon clocking 12.23 and 25.31 over 100m and 200m respectively. Clegg is sponsored by the property marketing business ESPC where she participated in work experience in 2008 during her time at The Royal Blind School.

Clegg has two brothers who have also competed at the Paralympics: James, who competed in the pool in the S12 category at London 2012, and Stephen, who also swam in the same class at Rio 2016 and Tokyo 2020.

Clegg won the 2014 Commonwealth Games T11/T12 100m with a run of 12.20 seconds, a world-leading time for the year. Due to illness, she was unable to defend her European titles in Swansea shortly after the Commonwealth games.

She split with guide runner Mikhail Huggins in 2015. Her new guide runner is Chris Clarke.

She was also made to withdraw from the 2015 IPC Athletics World Championships after just one race due to an ankle injury and this also meant that she lost funding from British Athletics.

In 2016, she was reclassified as a T11 athlete due to her deteriorating eye condition, requiring her to wear a blindfold while racing. Alongside guide Chris Clarke she won the T11 100m title and 200m title at the 2016 Paralympics.

Clegg was late addition to the British team for the postponed 2020 Summer Paralympics in Tokyo on 21 July 2021. The other additions were Jonnie Peacock, Kadeena Cox and David Weir.

She is trained by Joe McDonnell.

In June 2022 she appeared as guest presenter on an episode of The Gadget Show while Georgie Barrat was on maternity leave.

== Cycling career ==
In 2022, Clegg switched from athletics to cycling. She competed in cycling at the 2022 Commonwealth Games, finishing 4th in the women's tandem 1 km time trial B and women's tandem sprint B events. In October 2022, Clegg and James Ball earned a gold medal for Great Britain in the mixed team sprint event at the 2022 UCI Para-cycling Track World Championships.

== Honours ==
Clegg was appointed Member of the Order of the British Empire (MBE) in the 2017 New Year Honours list for services to athletics and charity.

Clegg has been awarded Scottish Athletics Athlete of the Year a record seven times (in 2006, 2008, 2011, 2012, 2013, 2014, and 2016). She has also been awarded the Scottish Disability Sport Athlete of the Year for athletics (the Findlay Calder Trophy) a record six times (in 2007, 2009, 2012, 2013, 2014, and 2016). She was also voted SDS Athletes' Athlete of the Year (the Gordon Brown Trophy) for parasports by her peers in 2012.

== Personal life ==
In October 2018, Clegg announced she was expecting her first child with fiancé Dan Powell in March 2019. They were engaged in October 2017. She has had physical injuries and has been affected by mental health issues. Her guide dog is called Bramble.

In April 2019 Clegg gave birth to a son.

In September 2019 it was announced she would be the first blind contestant to star in the reality TV series Dancing on Ice. She appeared in the show's 12th series in 2020 with partner Mark Hanretty, coming in third place.

In January 2024, Clegg announced to her followers on Instagram that she had split from her husband and was now a ‘single mum’ stating that “2023 was one of the hardest years”.

She has two brothers, James who won bronze in the pool at London 2012 Paralympics, and Stephen who became the first para swimmer in his class to break 28 seconds in the men’s 50m backstroke in 2023 and won the gold medal in the 100m backstroke at the Paris 2024 Paralympics, breaking the world record in the process.
