= Cycling at the 2022 Commonwealth Games – Women's tandem 1 km time trial B =

Women's tandem 1 km time trial B at the 2022 Commonwealth Games
- Venue: Lee Valley VeloPark
- Dates: 31 July
- Competitors: 10 from 4 nations
- Winning time: 1:07.138

Medalists
gold medal	Jessica Gallagher; Caitlin Ward	Australia
silver medal	Sophie Unwin; Georgia Holt	England
bronze medal	Aileen McGlynn; Ellie Stone	Scotland

The women's tandem 1 km time trial B at the 2022 Commonwealth Games, was part of the cycling programme, which took place on 31 July 2022. This event was for blind and visually impaired cyclists riding with a sighted pilot.

== Records ==
Prior to this competition, the existing world and Games records were as follows:

World record	Sophie Thornhill (GBR)	1:04.623	Brisbane, Australia	5 April 2018
Games record	Sophie Thornhill (ENG)	1:04.623	Brisbane, Australia	5 April 2018

== Schedule ==
The schedule is as follows:

All times are British Summer Time (UTC+1)

Date	Time	Round
Sunday 31 July 2022	15:18	Final

== Results ==
Rank	Nation	Riders	Time	Behind	Avg. speed (km/h)	Notes
1st place, gold medalist(s)	Australia	Jessica Gallagher; Caitlin Ward (pilot)	1:07.138		53.621	
2nd place, silver medalist(s)	England	Sophie Unwin; Georgia Holt (pilot)	1:07.554	+0.416	53.291	
3rd place, bronze medalist(s)	Scotland	Aileen McGlynn; Ellie Stone (pilot)	1:07.578	+0.440	53.272	
4	Scotland	Libby Clegg; Jenny Holl (pilot)	1:09.953	+2.815	51.463	
5	Wales	Nia Holt; Amy Cole (pilot)	1:13.435	+6.297	49.023	
