= Cycling at the 2022 Commonwealth Games – Women's tandem sprint B =

Women's tandem sprint B at the 2022 Commonwealth Games
- Venue: Lee Valley VeloPark
- Dates: 29 July
- Competitors: 8 from 3 nations

Medalists
gold medal	Jessica Gallagher; Caitlin Ward (pilot)	Australia
silver medal	Aileen McGlynn; Ellie Stone (pilot)	Scotland

The women's tandem sprint B at the 2022 Commonwealth Games was part of the cycling programme, and took place on 29 July 2022.

No bronze medal was awarded as the minimum requirement of five entries was not met, due to a late withdrawal from the fifth entered team. This meant that only the gold and silver were awarded, in accordance with Commonwealth Games Federation regulations.

== Records ==
Prior to this competition, the existing world and Games records were as follows:

World record	Sophie Thornhill (ENG)	10.609	Brisbane, Australia	5 April 2018
Games record	Sophie Thornhill (ENG)	10.609	Brisbane, Australia	5 April 2018

== Schedule ==
The schedule is as follows:

All times are British Summer Time (UTC+1)

Date	Time	Round
Friday 29 July 2022	10:02	Qualifying
Friday 29 July 2022	10:47	Semifinals
Friday 29 July 2022	16:02	Finals

== Results ==
=== Qualifying ===
Times in the qualifying rides determined seeding for the semifinals.

Rank	Nation	Riders	Time	Behind	Average speed (km/h)	Notes
1	Australia	Jessica Gallagher; Caitlin Ward (pilot)	10.675	—	67.447	
2	Scotland	Aileen McGlynn; Ellie Stone (pilot)	11.145	+0.470	64.603	
3	England	Sophie Unwin; Georgia Holt (pilot)	11.386	+0.711	63.236	
4	Scotland	Libby Clegg; Jenny Holl (pilot)	11.898	+1.223	60.514	

=== Semifinals ===
The winners race for the gold and silver medals. The losers race for third place.

Heat	Rank	Country	Riders	Race 1	Race 2	Decider	Notes
1	1	Australia	Jessica Gallagher; Caitlin Ward (pilot)	won	won		QG
1	2	Scotland	Libby Clegg; Jenny Holl (pilot)	+0.845	+1.821		
2	1	Scotland	Aileen McGlynn; Ellie Stone (pilot)	won	+0.111	won	QG
2	2	England	Sophie Unwin; Georgia Holt (pilot)	+0.139	won	REL	

=== Finals ===
The final classification is determined in the medal finals.

Rank	Country	Riders	Race 1	Race 2	Decider	Notes
Gold medal final
1st place, gold medalist(s)	Australia	Jessica Gallagher; Caitlin Ward (pilot)	won	won		
2nd place, silver medalist(s)	Scotland	Aileen McGlynn; Ellie Stone (pilot)	+0.518	+0.121		
3rd place decider
3	England	Sophie Unwin; Georgia Holt (pilot)	won	won		
4	Scotland	Libby Clegg; Jenny Holl (pilot)	+1.164	+1.128		
