= Huang Lisha =

Chinese Paralympic athlete (born 1988)

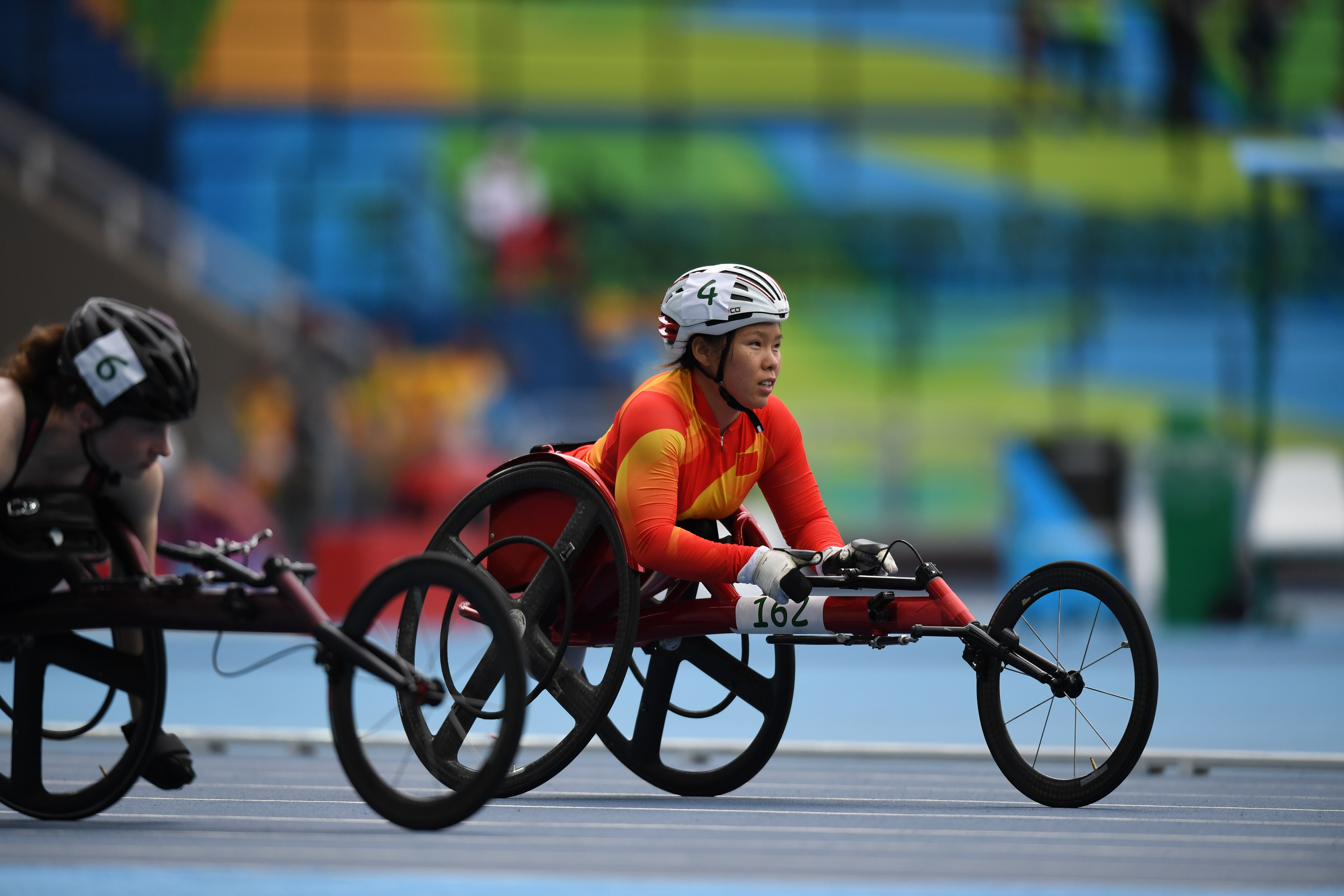
- Rio de Janeiro - T53 100 meters women's race, on the first day of athletics in the Rio 2016 Paralympic Games

Personal information
- Native name: 黄丽莎
- Born: September 10, 1988 (age 37)
Medal record
Track and field (T53)
Representing China
Paralympic Games
Gold medal – first place	2008 Beijing	100m T53
Gold medal – first place	2008 Beijing	200m T53
Gold medal – first place	2008 Beijing	4x100m T53/54
Gold medal – first place	2012 London	100m T53
Gold medal – first place	2012 London	200m T53
Gold medal – first place	2016 Rio de Janeiro	100m T53
Silver medal – second place	2012 London	800m T53
Bronze medal – third place	2012 London	400m T53
World Championships
Gold medal – first place	2011 Christchurch	100m T53
Gold medal – first place	2011 Christchurch	400m T53
Gold medal – first place	2011 Christchurch	4X400m relay T53-54
Gold medal – first place	2013 Lyon	100m T53
Gold medal – first place	2013 Lyon	200m T53
Gold medal – first place	2015 Doha	100m T53
Gold medal – first place	2015 Doha	4X400m relay T53-54
Silver medal – second place	2011 Christchurch	200m T53
Bronze medal – third place	2015 Doha	400m T53
Asian Para Games
Gold medal – first place	2010 Guangzhou	100m T53
Gold medal – first place	2010 Guangzhou	200m T53
Gold medal – first place	2014 Incheon	200m T53
Silver medal – second place	2010 Guangzhou	400m T53
Silver medal – second place	2014 Incheon	800m T53
Bronze medal – third place	2014 Incheon	1500m T54

Huang Lisha (Chinese: 黄丽莎; pinyin: Huáng Lìshā; born September 10, 1988) is a Paralympian athlete from China competing mainly in category T53 wheelchair sprint events.

She competed in the 2008 Summer Paralympics in Beijing, China. There she won a gold medal in the women's 100 m T53, a gold medal in the women's 200 m T53 and a gold medal in the women's 4 x 100 metre relay T53/54.

At the 2012 Summer Paralympics in London, United Kingdom she won a gold medal in the women's 100 m T53, a gold medal in the women's 200 m T53, a bronze medal in the women's 400 m T53 and a silver medal in the women's 800 m T53.
