= Jenny McLoughlin =

British Paralympic sprinter (born 1991)

Personal information
- Nationality: British
- Born: Jennifer McLoughlin; 3 October 1991 (age 34) Stockport, England

Sport
- Country: Wales, Great Britain
- Sport: Athletics
- Event: T37 sprint
- Club: Disability Sport Wales, Cardiff
- Coached by: Keith Antoine

Achievements and titles
- Paralympic finals: 2008, 2012
- Personal best(s): 100m sprint: 14.63m 200m sprint: 29.98m
Medal record
Women's athletics
Representing Wales
Commonwealth Games
| Silver medal – second place | 2010 Delhi | T37 100 m |
Representing Great Britain
Paralympic Games
| Bronze medal – third place | 2012 London | Women's 4 × 100 m relay T35–T38 |
IPC Athletics World Championships
| Bronze medal – third place | 2011 Christchurch | Women's 4 × 100 m relay T35–T38 |
IPC Athletics European Championships
| Silver medal – second place | 2012 Stadskanaal | 200m – T37 |
| Silver medal – second place | 2014 Swansea | 100m – T35–38 |

Jenny McLoughlin (born 3 October 1991) is a British Paralympian track and field athlete competing mainly in T37 sprint events. She has represented Great Britain in the 2008 Summer Paralympics and in the 2012 Summer Paralympics in London. After moving to Wales at the age of 14, she became eligible to join the Wales team for the Commonwealth Games, winning silver in the T37 sprint in India.

== History ==
McLoughlin was born in Stockport in England in 1991. McLoughlin, who has cerebral palsy, joined an athletics club when her family moved to Wales in 2005. She joined the Athletics team and switched her training ground to Cardiff in 2007, taking the UK School Games gold that year. In 2008 McLoughlin was selected to represent Great Britain in the 2008 Summer Paralympics in Beijing in both the 100m and 200m sprints in the T37 class. She failed to qualify out of the first heat in the 200m, but reached the 2nd heat in the 100m, finishing 7th.

In 2009, she continued to compete across meets in Britain, and recorded two of her best times at the CP Sport Grand Prix in Nottingham; 15.14s in the 100m and 31.98 in the 200m. In 2010 as a resident of Wales, she was invited to join the Wales team at the 2010 Commonwealth Games in Delhi. She competed in the T37 sprint and equalled her personal best of 14.68 seconds, a result which saw her take the silver medal. 2010 also saw McLoughlin complete her A Levels, which allowed her to take up a degree at Cardiff University.

McLoughlin was selected to represent Great Britain in the 2011 IPC Athletics World Championships in Christchurch, New Zealand in both the 100m and 200m. She qualified for the 100m final after running a personal best of 14.99s, and although improving on that in the final with a time of 14.78s, she finished 7th. She also reached the finals of the 200m, finishing 8th.

McLoughlin continued to improve in 2012, posting her first sub-30-second time for the 200m at the Samsung Diamond League in July. She also improved her 100m personal best with a result of 14.68s at the German National Paralympic Championships. These results helped McLoughlin qualify for the 2012 Summer Paralympics in London, representing Great Britain in the T37 100 and 200 metres and as part of the 100m relay.

In 2013, McLoughlin was ruled out of the IPC World Championships through injury. However, in 2014 McLoughlin came back to finish a credible fifth at the IPC European Championships, a month after setting a new personal best of 14.34. There was more medal success in the relay for McLoughlin, as she anchored the T35–38 relay team of Olivia Breen Bethany Woodward and Sophie Hahn home to silver in a British record of 53.84
