= Ewa Zielińska =

Polish Paralympic athlete

Medal record

Paralympic athletics

Representing Poland

Paralympic Games
Bronze medal – third place	2008 Beijing	Long Jump - F42

European Championships
Bronze medal – third place	2012 Stadskanaal	100m - T42

Ewa Zielińska (born 25 December 1972) is a Paralympian athlete from Poland competing mainly in category F42 long jump and T42 sprint events.

She competed in the women's F42 long jump at the 2004 Summer Paralympics in Athens, Greece, but failed to win a medal. She improved in the 2008 Summer Paralympics in Beijing, China, where she won a bronze medal in the women's F42 long jump event, but failed to win a medal in the T42 100m.
