= Uta Streckert =

German Paralympic athlete

Personal information
- National team: Germany
- Born: 23 March 1994 (age 32) Friedrichshafen

Sport
- Sport: Para-athletics
- Disability class: T35
Medal record
Women's para-athletics
Representing Germany
World Championships
Bronze medal – third place	2011 Christchurch	200 metres

Uta Streckert (born 23 March 1994) is a German female paralympic athlete. She went onto compete at the 2016 Summer Paralympics representing Germany.

She also participated in the 2011 IPC Athletics World Championships and won a bronze medal in the Women's 200 metres event.
