= Rachael Dodds =

Australian athletics competitor

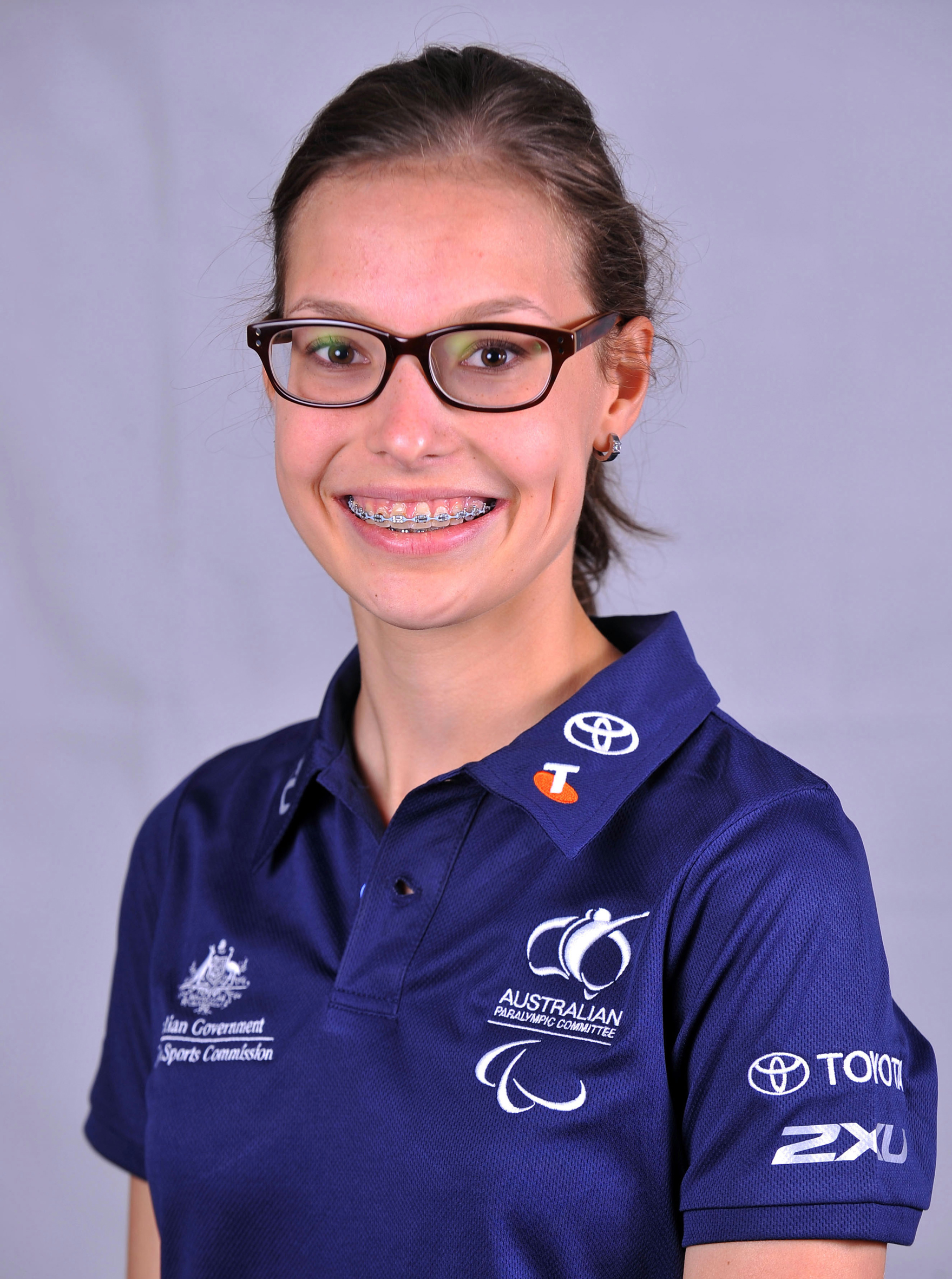
- 2012 Australian Paralympic team portrait of Dodds

Personal information
- Nationality: Australian
- Born: 26 November 1994 (age 31)

Sport
- Country: Australia
- Sport: Paralympic athletics

Rachael Dodds (born 26 November 1994) is an Australian athletics competitor. She was selected to represent Australia at the 2012 Summer Paralympics in athletics. She did not medal at the 2012 Games.

== Personal ==
Dodds was born on 26 November 1994, and is from Hawthorne, a suburb of Brisbane in Queensland. She has cerebral palsy and was born prematurely. She has attended Cannon Hill Anglican College since 2008.

Dodds was the 2011 The Courier-Mail PKF Queensland disabled athlete of the year. She earned the title of South East Advertiser YoungStar for 2011–12.

== Athletics ==
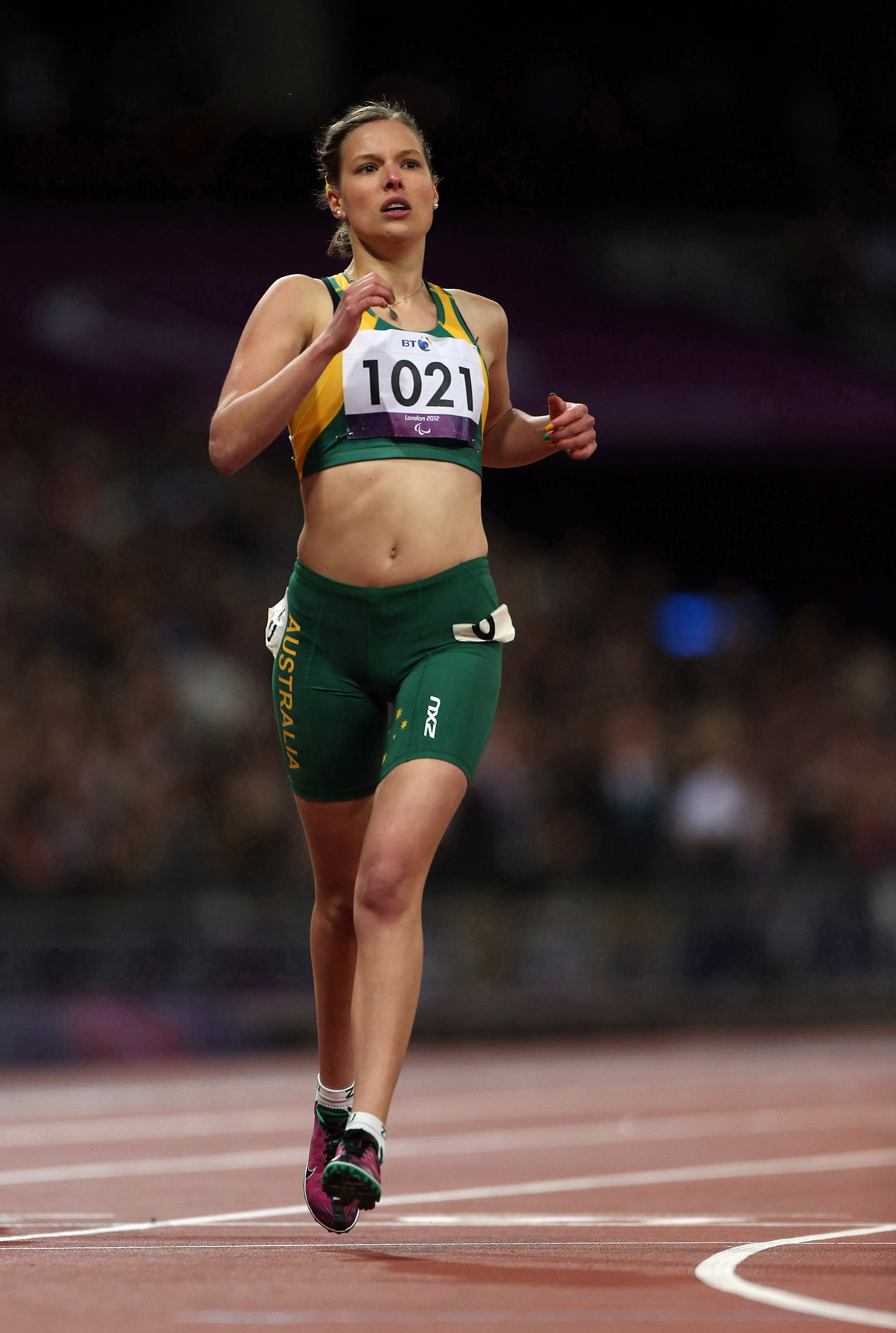
Dodds at the 2012 London Paralympics

Dodds is a T35 competitor, and is coached by Cherina Kelly. As of 2011, she trains at the Queensland Sport and Athletics Centre. She competes in 100 metre, 200 metre, 800 metre and 1,500 metre events.

Dodds started competing in 2007, having been introduced to the sport by her physiotherapist Tanya Winter. While her preferred events are the 800 metre and 1,500 metres, she switched to sprint events in order to maximize her chances of making the Paralympics. In 2010, she competed in the Australian Championships in Perth where she set a world record in the 200 metre event. She made her international debut at the Christchurch hosted 2011 IPC Athletics World Championships, finishing first in the 200 metre event and second in the 100 metre event. She competed in the 2012 Brisbane Track Classic, where she set a personal best time of 17.21 seconds in the T35 100 metre event. At the 2012 Qantas Australian Athletics Tour – Adelaide Track Classic, she finished eighth in the women's 200 metre ambulant event with a time of 36.48 seconds. She was selected to represent Australia at the 2012 Summer Paralympics in athletics in the T35 100m and 200m events. She did not medal at the 2012 Games.
