= Iris Pruysen =

Dutch Paralympic athlete (born 1987)

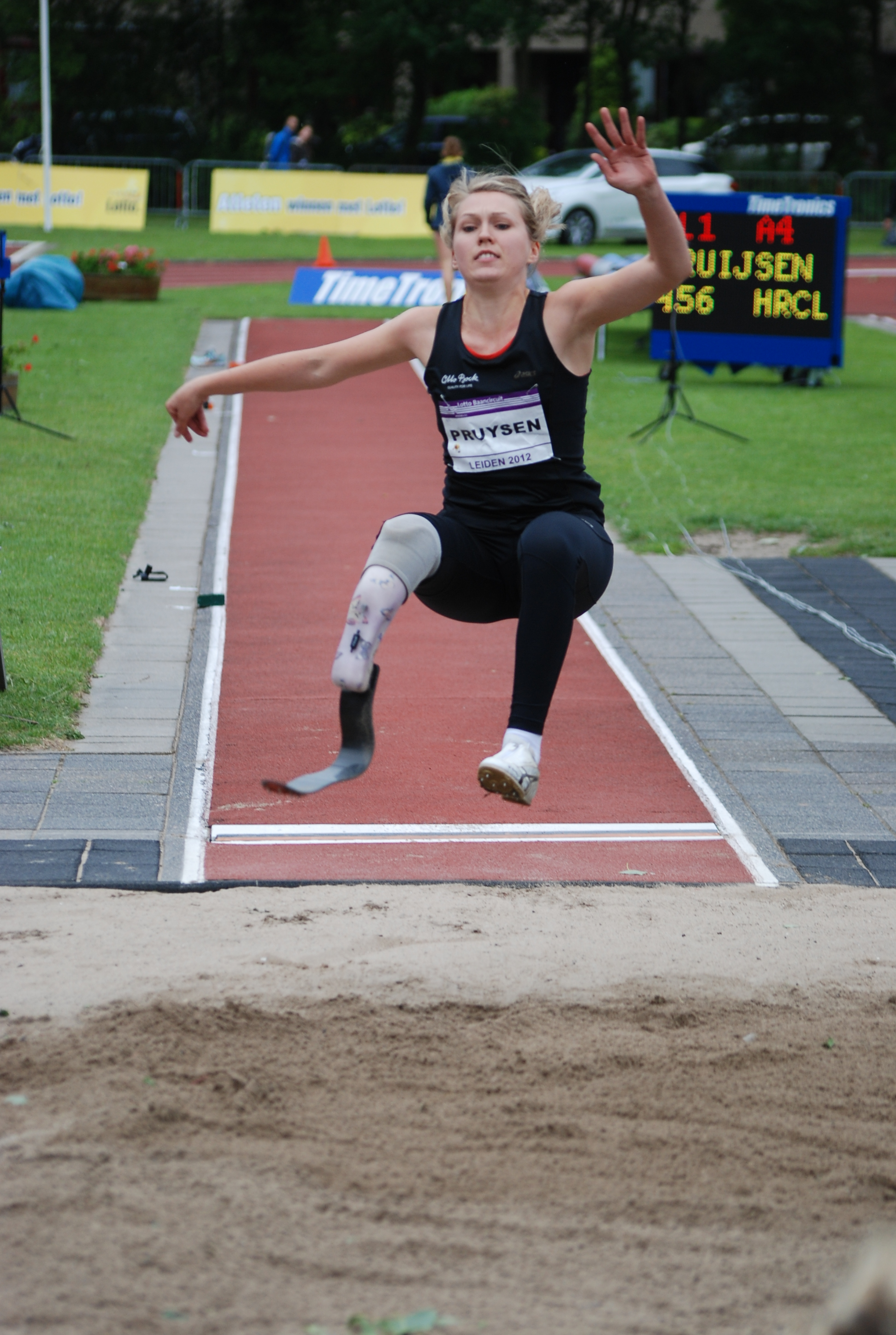

Personal information
- Born: 26 November 1987 (age 38) Zwijndrecht, Netherlands

Sport
- Country: Netherlands
- Sport: Paralympic athletics
- Disability class: T44
- Retired: 2018
Medal record
Paralympic athletics
Representing Netherlands
World Championships
Gold medal – first place	2013 Lyon	Long jump T44
European Championships
Bronze medal – third place	2012 Stadskanaal	100m T44
Bronze medal – third place	2012 Stadskanaal	200m T44
Bronze medal – third place	2014 Swansea	Long jump T44

Iris Pruysen (born 26 November 1987) is a Dutch retired Paralympic athlete who competed in sprinting and long jump at international elite competitions. She is a World champion and a European bronze medalist in long jump. Pruysen lost her lower right leg following a gas explosion on a boat at a sailing camp in IJsselmeer. She had her leg amputated a few days later in Erasmus Hospital in Rotterdam.
