= Hana Kolníková =

Slovak athlete

Personal information
- Born: 19 July 1989 (age 36) Trnava, Czechoslovakia

Sport
- Sport: Paralympic athletics
Medal record
Representing Slovakia
World Championships
Silver medal – second place	2011 Christchurch	100m T12
Silver medal – second place	2011 Christchurch	200m T12
Bronze medal – third place	2013 Lyon	100m T12
Bronze medal – third place	2013 Lyon	200m T12
European Championships
Silver medal – second place	2012 Stadskanaal	200m T12
Bronze medal – third place	2012 Stadskanaal	100m T12
Bronze medal – third place	2014 Swansea	100m T12

Hana Kolníková (born 19 July 1989) is a Slovak retired Paralympic athlete who competed in international track and field competitions. She is a World and European silver medalist in sprinting and competed at the 2008 and 2012 Summer Paralympics.
