= Katrina Hart =

British paralympic sprinter (born 1990)

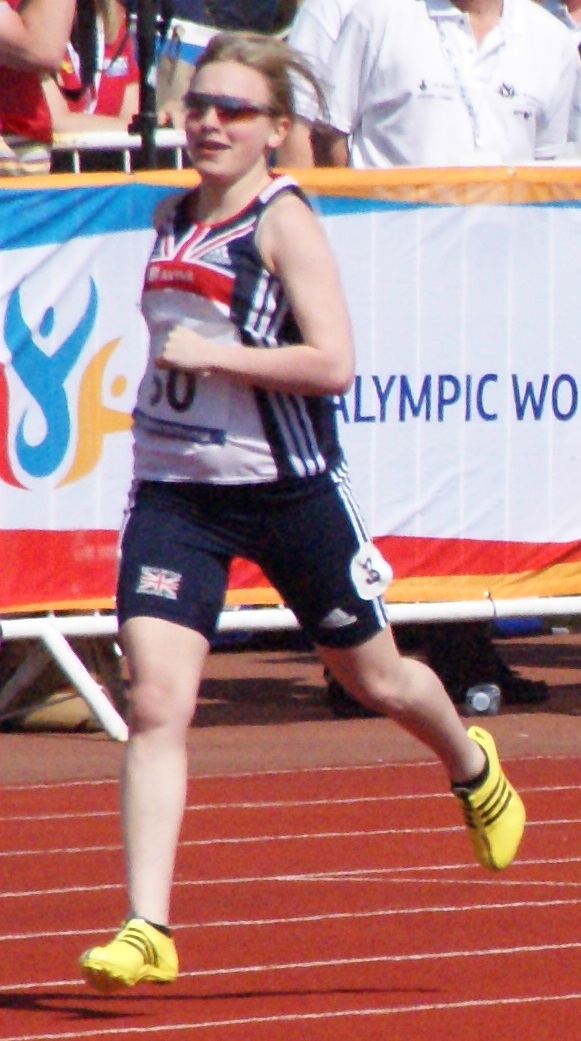
- Katrina Hart at the BT Paralympics World Cup in 2009

Personal information
- Nickname: Sparrow
- Nationality: British
- Born: 17 May 1990 (age 36) Birmingham, England

Sport
- Country: Great Britain; England
- Sport: Athletics
- Event(s): 200 m T36 & 100 m T37
- Coached by: Rob Ellchuk
Medal record
Representing Great Britain
Paralympic Games
Bronze medal – third place	2012 London	Women's 4x100 m Relay T35-T38
IPC Athletics World Championships
Gold medal – first place	2011 Christchurch	200m T37
Bronze medal – third place	2011 Christchurch	100m T37
Bronze medal – third place	2011 Christchurch	4x100m T35-T38
IPC Athletics European Championships
Bronze medal – third place	2012 Stadskanaal	100m T37
Bronze medal – third place	2012 Stadskanaal	200m T37
Representing England
Commonwealth Games
Gold medal – first place	2010 Delhi	T37 100 m
- Updated on 8 August 2012

Katrina Hart (born 17 May 1990) is an English athlete who won a gold medal for England at the 2010 Commonwealth Games competing in women's 100 m T37 (athletes with cerebral palsy). She had competed at the 2008 Paralympics but was forced to withdraw through injury, and has won multiple medals at the IPC Athletics World Championships.

== Early life ==
Hart was born in Birmingham, England, on 17 May 1990. She was born with cerebral palsy. She attended Pershore High School and She took up running after being spotted at the age of 14, and a year later she won a bronze medal at the 2005 European Championships in the T37 100 m as the youngest member of the British team.

== Sporting career ==
In 2007, she was second fastest in world in the T37 100 m and third fastest at the T37 200 m. She was selected for the British team for the 2008 Summer Paralympics in Beijing. She received an injury to her hamstring whilst running in the finals of the 100 m, finishing in seventh place and resulting in her withdrawing from the 200 m. She had gone into the Games suffering from both hamstring and shin injuries, but later credited her work there as strengthening her mentally.

After the Games she moved to Bath to train at the University of Bath. She competed for England at the 2010 Commonwealth Games where she won the gold medal in the T37 100 m. It was her first major international title, and she set a new personal best time of 14.75. She won three medals at the 2011 IPC Athletics World Championships, a gold in the T37 200 m and a bronze in the T37 100 m and in the T35-T38 4x100 m relay. In 2012, she won bronze medals in both the T37 100 m and 200 m at the 2012 European Championships.

== Personal life ==
Hart graduated from the University of Bath in 2011 with a degree in Sports Performance. She is nicknamed "Sparrow" for her size, although she has ornithophobia, the fear of birds. She is a supporter of Birmingham City F.C.

Hart is the cousin of musician Adam Barry who plays in the British folk group Merrymouth.
