= Hong Kong at the 2012 Summer Paralympics =

- IPC code: HKG
- NPC: Hong Kong Paralympic Committee & Sports Association for the Physically Disabled
- Website: www.hkparalympic.org

in London
- Competitors: 28 in 7 sports
- Flag bearers: Opening: So Wa Wai (Athletics); Closing: Yu Chui Yee (Wheelchair Fencing)
- Medals Ranked 34th: Gold 3 Silver 3 Bronze 6 Total 12

Summer Paralympics appearances (overview)
- 1972; 1976; 1980; 1984; 1988; 1992; 1996; 2000; 2004; 2008; 2012; 2016; 2020; 2024

Hong Kong, China sent a delegation to compete at the 2012 Summer Paralympics in London. The team was composed of 28 competitors.

== Medallists ==
Medal	Name	Sport	Event	Date
Gold	Wong Ka Man	Table Tennis	Women's individual C11	2 September
Gold	Yu Chui Yee	Wheelchair fencing	Women's foil A	4 September
Gold	Yu Chui Yee	Wheelchair fencing	Women's Épée A	5 September
Silver	So Wa Wai	Athletics	Men's 200m T36	6 September
Silver	Yeung Chi Ka	Table Tennis	Women's individual C11	2 September
Silver	Tam Chik Sum	Wheelchair fencing	Men's Épée B	5 September
Bronze	Au Kai Lun	Swimming	Men's 100 metre backstroke S14	31 August
Bronze	Chan Yui Chong	Wheelchair fencing	Women's Épée B	5 September
Bronze	Chan Wing Kin	Wheelchair fencing	Men's Sabre A	6 September
Bronze	Leung Shu Hang	Swimming	Women's 100 metre breaststroke SB14	6 September
Bronze	Yu Chui Yee; Chan Yui Chong; Fan Pui Shan	Wheelchair fencing	Women's Team Épée Open	7 September
Bronze	Chan Wing Kin; Chung Ting Ching; Wong Tang Tat	Wheelchair fencing	Men's Team Foil Open	8 September

Medals by discipline
Discipline	Gold medal	Silver medal	Bronze medal	Total
Athletics	0	1	0	1
Boccia	0	0	0	0
Equestrian	0	0	0	0
Shooting	0	0	0	0
Swimming	0	0	2	2
Table tennis	1	1	0	2
Wheelchair fencing	2	1	4	7
Total	3	3	6	12

Medals by date
Day	Date	Gold medal	Silver medal	Bronze medal	Total
1	29 Aug	0	0	0	0
2	30 Aug	0	0	0	0
3	31 Aug	0	0	1	1
4	1 Sep	0	0	0	0
5	2 Sep	1	1	0	2
6	3 Sep	0	0	0	0
7	4 Sep	1	0	0	1
8	5 Sep	1	1	1	3
9	6 Sep	0	1	2	3
10	7 Sep	0	0	1	1
11	8 Sep	0	0	1	1
12	9 Sep	0	0	0	0
Total		3	3	6	12

=== Multiple medallists ===
Name	Medal	Sport	Events
Yu Chui Yee	Gold; Gold; Bronze	Wheelchair Fencing	Women's foil A Women's Épée A Women's Team Épée Open
Chan Wing Kin	Bronze; Bronze	Wheelchair Fencing	Men's Sabre A Men's Team Foil Open
Chan Yui Chong	Bronze; Bronze	Wheelchair Fencing	Women's Épée B Women's Team Épée Open

== Athletics ==
Men

Athlete	Events	Heat		Final	
Athlete	Events	Time	Rank	Time	Rank
So Wa Wai	100 m T36	12.38 Q	3	12.28	4
So Wa Wai	200 m T36	—N/a		24.77	2nd place, silver medalist(s)

Women

Athlete	Events	Heat		Final	
Athlete	Events	Time	Rank	Time	Rank
Yu Chun Lai	100 m T36	16.32	5	did not advance	
Yu Chun Lai	200 m T36	34.57 q	8	35.32	6

== Boccia ==
Mixed Individual

Athlete	Event	Seeding matches	Round of 32	Round of 16	Quarterfinals	Semifinals	Bronze Medal Match	Final	
Athlete	Event	Opposition Score	Opposition Score	Opposition Score	Opposition Score	Opposition Score	Opposition Score	Opposition Score	Rank
Leung Mei Yee	Mixed individual BC1	BYE	Ventura Flores (MEX); W 6–2	Fernandes (POR); L 6–1	did not advance				14
Wong Kam Lung	Mixed individual BC1	BYE		Zhang (CHN); L 9–1	did not advance				16
Kwok Hoi Ying, Karen	Mixed individual BC2	BYE	Zhong (CHN); L 3–2	did not advance					22
Yeung Hiu Lam	Mixed individual BC2	BYE	Richer (CAN); W 3–2	Serbus (CZE); W 12–0	Jeong (KOR); L 5–4	5th/8th Playoffs; Murray (GBR); W 11–0	did not advance	5th/6th Playoffs; Valente (POR); L 4-1	6
Lau Wai Yan, Vivian	Mixed individual BC4	BYE	—N/a		Yoojaroen (THA); W 4–1	Zheng (CHN); L 3–1	5th/8th Playoffs; Leung (HKG); L 3–1	7th/8th Playoffs; Mcguire (GBR); W 3*–3	7
Leung Yuk Wing	Mixed individual BC4	BYE	—N/a		Vieira (POR); W 10–0	dos Santos (BRA); L 4–2	5th/8th Playoffs; Lau (HKG); W 3–1	5th/6th Playoffs; Prochazka (CZE); W 6-2	5

Mixed Pairs

Athlete	Event	Pool matches			Quarterfinals	Semifinals	Bronze medal match	Final	
Athlete	Event	Opposition	Score	Rank	Opposition Score	Opposition Score	Opposition Score	Opposition Score	Rank
Lau Wai Yan, Vivian; Leung Yuk Wing	Mixed pairs BC4	Czech Republic (CZE)	L 6–5	3	did not advance				5
Lau Wai Yan, Vivian; Leung Yuk Wing	Mixed pairs BC4	Brazil (BRA)	L 7–4	3	did not advance				5
Lau Wai Yan, Vivian; Leung Yuk Wing	Mixed pairs BC4	Portugal (POR)	W 7–1	3	did not advance				5

Mixed Team

Athlete	Event	Pool matches			Quarterfinals	Semifinals	Bronze medal match	Final	
Athlete	Event	Opposition	Score	Rank	Opposition Score	Opposition Score	Opposition Score	Opposition Score	Rank
Leung Mei Yee; Kwok Hoi Ying, Karen; Yeung Hiu Lam; Wong Kam Lung	Mixed team BC1-2	Japan (JPN)	L 7–6	2 Q	Great Britain (GBR); L 11–3	did not advance			6
Leung Mei Yee; Kwok Hoi Ying, Karen; Yeung Hiu Lam; Wong Kam Lung	Mixed team BC1-2	Spain (ESP)	W 6–4	2 Q	Great Britain (GBR); L 11–3	did not advance			6

== Equestrian ==
Athlete	Horse	Event	Total	
Athlete	Horse	Event	Score	Rank
Tse Pui Ting, Natasha	Undulette	Individual championship test grade Ia	64.000	14
Tse Pui Ting, Natasha	Undulette	Individual freestyle test grade Ia	64.050	14

== Shooting ==
Athlete	Event	Qualification		Final	
Athlete	Event	Score	Rank	Score	Rank
Leung Yuk Chun	Women's P2-10m Air Pistol-SH1	355	12	did not advance	

== Swimming ==
Men

Athlete	Events	Heats		Final	
Athlete	Events	Time	Rank	Time	Rank
Au Kai Lun	100 m backstroke S14	1:05.69 Q	6	1:04.53	3rd place, bronze medalist(s)
Au Kai Lun	100 m breaststroke SB14	1:12.79 Q	8	1:13.54	8
Au Kai Lun	200 m freestyle S14	2:06.78	11	did not advance	
Lee Tsun Sang	100 m backstroke S14	1:06.25	9	did not advance	
Lee Tsun Sang	100 m breaststroke SB14	1:13.87	10	did not advance	
Lee Tsun Sang	200 m freestyle S14	2:06.56	10	did not advance	
Tang Wai Lok	100 m backstroke S14	1:06.11 Q	8	1:06.31	7
Tang Wai Lok	100 m breaststroke SB14	1:17.21	14	did not advance	
Tang Wai Lok	200 m freestyle S14	2:03.71 Q	7	2:02.89	6

Women

Athlete	Events	Heats		Final	
Athlete	Events	Time	Rank	Time	Rank
Chow Yuen Ying	100 m backstroke S14	1:18.79	11	did not advance	
Chow Yuen Ying	100 m breaststroke SB14	1:30.28	13	did not advance	
Chow Yuen Ying	200 m freestyle S14	2:31.95	16	did not advance	
Leung Shu Hang	100 m backstroke S14	1:14.09 Q	8	1:13.44	8
Leung Shu Hang	100 m breaststroke SB14	1:21.96 Q	3	1:21.21	3rd place, bronze medalist(s)
Leung Shu Hang	200 m freestyle S14	2:21.51	10	did not advance	

== Table tennis ==
Men

Athlete	Event	Preliminaries			Quarterfinals	Semifinals	Bronze Medal Match	Finals	
Athlete	Event	Opposition	Score	Rank	Opposition Result	Opposition Result	Opposition Result	Opposition Result	Rank
Ko Hang Yee	Singles class 3	Oluade (NGR)	W 3–0	2	did not advance				
Ko Hang Yee	Singles class 3	Robin (FRA)	L 3–2	2	did not advance				
Choy Hing Lam	Singles class 6	Rau (GER)	W 3–1	1	Rosenmeier (DEN) (2); L 3–0	did not advance			
Choy Hing Lam	Singles class 6	Gregorovic (CRO)	W 3–0	1	Rosenmeier (DEN) (2); L 3–0	did not advance			

Women

Athlete	Event	Preliminaries			Quarterfinals	Semifinals	Bronze Medal Match	Finals	
Athlete	Event	Opposition	Score	Rank	Opposition Result	Opposition Result	Opposition Result	Opposition Result	Rank
Wong Pui Yi	Singles class 5	Hsiao (TPE)	L 3–2	3	did not advance				
Wong Pui Yi	Singles class 5	Lundback (SWE)	L 3–2	3	did not advance				
Wong Ka Man	Singles class 11	Kosacheva (RUS)	W 3–1	1	—N/a	Siemieniecka (POL); W 3–2	BYE	Yeung (HKG); W 3–2	1st place, gold medalist(s)
Wong Ka Man	Singles class 11	Bromley (GBR)	W 3–0	1	—N/a	Siemieniecka (POL); W 3–2	BYE	Yeung (HKG); W 3–2	1st place, gold medalist(s)
Yeung Chi Ka	Singles class 11	Faust (BRA)	W 3–0	1	—N/a	Kosacheva (RUS); W 3–1	BYE	Wong (HKG); L 3–2	2nd place, silver medalist(s)
Yeung Chi Ka	Singles class 11	Siemieniecka (POL)	W 3–0	1	—N/a	Kosacheva (RUS); W 3–1	BYE	Wong (HKG); L 3–2	2nd place, silver medalist(s)

== Wheelchair fencing ==
Men

Athlete	Event	Qualification			Round of 16	Quarterfinal	Semifinal	Bronze medal match	Final	
Athlete	Event	Opposition	Score	Rank	Opposition Score	Opposition Score	Opposition Score	Opposition Score	Opposition Score	Rank
Chan Wing Kin	Individual Foil A	Osvath (HUN)	W 5–3	5 Q	BYE	Osvath (HUN); L 15-6	did not advance			5
Chan Wing Kin	Individual Foil A	Andreev (RUS)	W 5–4	5 Q	BYE	Osvath (HUN); L 15-6	did not advance			5
Chan Wing Kin	Individual Foil A	Lemoine (FRA)	L 5–4	5 Q	BYE	Osvath (HUN); L 15-6	did not advance			5
Chan Wing Kin	Individual Foil A	Rodriguez (USA)	W 5–1	5 Q	BYE	Osvath (HUN); L 15-6	did not advance			5
Chan Wing Kin	Individual Sabre A	Alexakis (GRE)	W 5–2	3 Q	BYE	Cheong (HKG); W 15–11	Tian (CHN); L 15–4	Stanczuk (POL); W 15–9	did not advance	3rd place, bronze medalist(s)
Chan Wing Kin	Individual Sabre A	Fayzullin (RUS)	W 5–3	3 Q	BYE	Cheong (HKG); W 15–11	Tian (CHN); L 15–4	Stanczuk (POL); W 15–9	did not advance	3rd place, bronze medalist(s)
Chan Wing Kin	Individual Sabre A	Chen (CHN)	W 5–3	3 Q	BYE	Cheong (HKG); W 15–11	Tian (CHN); L 15–4	Stanczuk (POL); W 15–9	did not advance	3rd place, bronze medalist(s)
Chan Wing Kin	Individual Sabre A	Makowski (POL)	W 5–2	3 Q	BYE	Cheong (HKG); W 15–11	Tian (CHN); L 15–4	Stanczuk (POL); W 15–9	did not advance	3rd place, bronze medalist(s)
Wong Tang Tat	Individual Foil A	Demchuk (UKR)	L 5–1	16	did not advance					16
Wong Tang Tat	Individual Foil A	Tokatlian (FRA)	L 5–0	16	did not advance					16
Wong Tang Tat	Individual Foil A	Ye (CHN)	L 5–0	16	did not advance					16
Wong Tang Tat	Individual Foil A	Alhaddad (KUW)	L 5–1	16	did not advance					16
Wong Tang Tat	Individual Foil A	Makowski (POL)	L 5–0	16	did not advance					16
Wong Tang Tat	Individual Épée A	Tian (CHN)	L 5–2	15	did not advance					15
Wong Tang Tat	Individual Épée A	Tsedryk (UKR)	L 5–2	15	did not advance					15
Wong Tang Tat	Individual Épée A	Citerne (FRA)	L 5–2	15	did not advance					15
Wong Tang Tat	Individual Épée A	Pender (POL)	L 5–4	15	did not advance					15
Cheong Meng Chai	Individual Sabre A	Tsedryk (UKR)	W 5–1	6 Q	Hall Butcher (GBR); W 15–10	Chan (HKG); L 15–11	did not advance			7
Cheong Meng Chai	Individual Sabre A	Butcher (GBR)	W 5–4	6 Q	Hall Butcher (GBR); W 15–10	Chan (HKG); L 15–11	did not advance			7
Cheong Meng Chai	Individual Sabre A	Tian (CHN)	L 5–1	6 Q	Hall Butcher (GBR); W 15–10	Chan (HKG); L 15–11	did not advance			7
Cheong Meng Chai	Individual Sabre A	Noble (FRA)	W 5–3	6 Q	Hall Butcher (GBR); W 15–10	Chan (HKG); L 15–11	did not advance			7
Tam Chik Sum	Individual Sabre B	Pluta (POL)	L 5–2	13 Q	did not advance					13
Tam Chik Sum	Individual Sabre B	Cratere (FRA)	L 5–1	13 Q	did not advance					13
Tam Chik Sum	Individual Sabre B	Marquez (ESP)	L 5–3	13 Q	did not advance					13
Tam Chik Sum	Individual Sabre B	Mainville (CAN)	L 5–3	13 Q	did not advance					13
Tam Chik Sum	Individual Épée B	Ali (IRQ)	W 5–4	4 Q	BYE	Hu (CHN); W 15–9	Bezyazychny (BLR); W 15–10	BYE	Silva Guissone (BRA); L 15–14	2nd place, silver medalist(s)
Tam Chik Sum	Individual Épée B	Estep (USA)	W 5–4	4 Q	BYE	Hu (CHN); W 15–9	Bezyazychny (BLR); W 15–10	BYE	Silva Guissone (BRA); L 15–14	2nd place, silver medalist(s)
Tam Chik Sum	Individual Épée B	Latreche (FRA)	L 5–4	4 Q	BYE	Hu (CHN); W 15–9	Bezyazychny (BLR); W 15–10	BYE	Silva Guissone (BRA); L 15–14	2nd place, silver medalist(s)
Tam Chik Sum	Individual Épée B	Palavecino (ARG)	W 5–2	4 Q	BYE	Hu (CHN); W 15–9	Bezyazychny (BLR); W 15–10	BYE	Silva Guissone (BRA); L 15–14	2nd place, silver medalist(s)
Chung Ting Ching	Individual Foil B	Guissone (BRA)	W 5–3	8 Q	Cima (ITA); L 15–13	did not advance				9
Chung Ting Ching	Individual Foil B	Datsko (UKR)	L 5–2	8 Q	Cima (ITA); L 15–13	did not advance				9
Chung Ting Ching	Individual Foil B	Wyganowski (POL)	W 5–3	8 Q	Cima (ITA); L 15–13	did not advance				9
Chung Ting Ching	Individual Foil B	Cima (ITA)	L 5–4	8 Q	Cima (ITA); L 15–13	did not advance				9
Chung Ting Ching	Individual Épée B	Lemiashkevich (BLR)	L 5–3	14	did not advance					14
Chung Ting Ching	Individual Épée B	Kuzyukov (RUS)	L 5–4	14	did not advance					14
Chung Ting Ching	Individual Épée B	Cratere (FRA)	L 5–1	14	did not advance					14
Chung Ting Ching	Individual Épée B	Hu (CHN)	L 5–0	14	did not advance					14

Athlete	Event	Quarterfinal	Semifinal	Bronze medal match	Final	
Athlete	Event	Opposition Score	Opposition Score	Opposition Score	Opposition Score	Rank
Chung Ting Ching; Wong Tang Tat; Chan Wing Kin	Men's Team Foil Open	Great Britain (GBR) (8); W 45-19	France (FRA) (5); L 45–41	Italy (ITA) (3); W 45-42	did not advance	3rd place, bronze medalist(s)

Women

Athlete	Event	Qualification			Quarterfinal	Semifinal	Bronze medal match	Final	
Athlete	Event	Opposition	Score	Rank	Opposition Score	Opposition Score	Opposition Score	Opposition Score	Rank
Fan Pui Shan	Individual Foil A	Trigilia (ITA)	W 5–2	10	did not advance				10
Fan Pui Shan	Individual Foil A	Rong (CHN)	L 5–4	10	did not advance				10
Fan Pui Shan	Individual Foil A	Lao (MAC)	L 5–4	10	did not advance				10
Fan Pui Shan	Individual Foil A	Krajnyak (HUN)	L 5–1	10	did not advance				10
Fan Pui Shan	Individual Épée A	Wu (CHN)	L 5–0	11	did not advance				11
Fan Pui Shan	Individual Épée A	Lao (MAC)	L 5–4	11	did not advance				11
Fan Pui Shan	Individual Épée A	Gorlina (UKR)	L 5–1	11	did not advance				11
Fan Pui Shan	Individual Épée A	Krajnyak (HUN)	L 5–2	11	did not advance				11
Fan Pui Shan	Individual Épée A	Fidrych (POL)	W 5–4	11	did not advance				11
Yu Chui Yee	Individual Foil A	Poignet (FRA)	W 5–4	1 Q	Poignet (FRA); W 15–7	Karjnyak (HUN); W 15–4	BYE	Wu (CHN); W 15–13	1st place, gold medalist(s)
Yu Chui Yee	Individual Foil A	Wu (CHN)	W 5–1	1 Q	Poignet (FRA); W 15–7	Karjnyak (HUN); W 15–4	BYE	Wu (CHN); W 15–13	1st place, gold medalist(s)
Yu Chui Yee	Individual Foil A	Sycheva (RUS)	W 5–1	1 Q	Poignet (FRA); W 15–7	Karjnyak (HUN); W 15–4	BYE	Wu (CHN); W 15–13	1st place, gold medalist(s)
Yu Chui Yee	Individual Foil A	Juhasz (HUN)	W 5–0	1 Q	Poignet (FRA); W 15–7	Karjnyak (HUN); W 15–4	BYE	Wu (CHN); W 15–13	1st place, gold medalist(s)
Yu Chui Yee	Individual Foil A	Bouwkamp (USA)	W 5–0	1 Q	Poignet (FRA); W 15–7	Karjnyak (HUN); W 15–4	BYE	Wu (CHN); W 15–13	1st place, gold medalist(s)
Yu Chui Yee	Individual Épée A	Poignet (FRA)	W 5–4	2 Q	Kim (KOR); W 15–9	Wu (CHN); W 15–11	BYE	Karjnyak (HUN); W 15–6	1st place, gold medalist(s)
Yu Chui Yee	Individual Épée A	Juhasz (HUN)	W 5–4	2 Q	Kim (KOR); W 15–9	Wu (CHN); W 15–11	BYE	Karjnyak (HUN); W 15–6	1st place, gold medalist(s)
Yu Chui Yee	Individual Épée A	Kim (KOR)	W 5–4	2 Q	Kim (KOR); W 15–9	Wu (CHN); W 15–11	BYE	Karjnyak (HUN); W 15–6	1st place, gold medalist(s)
Yu Chui Yee	Individual Épée A	Efimova (RUS)	L 5–3	2 Q	Kim (KOR); W 15–9	Wu (CHN); W 15–11	BYE	Karjnyak (HUN); W 15–6	1st place, gold medalist(s)
Yu Chui Yee	Individual Épée A	Morel (CAN)	W 5–0	2 Q	Kim (KOR); W 15–9	Wu (CHN); W 15–11	BYE	Karjnyak (HUN); W 15–6	1st place, gold medalist(s)
Chan Yui Chong	Individual Foil B	Vasileva (RUS)	W 5–2	2 Q	Yao (CHN); L 15–13	did not advance			5
Chan Yui Chong	Individual Foil B	Makowska (POL)	W 5–1	2 Q	Yao (CHN); L 15–13	did not advance			5
Chan Yui Chong	Individual Foil B	Dani (HUN)	W 5–1	2 Q	Yao (CHN); L 15–13	did not advance			5
Chan Yui Chong	Individual Foil B	Yao (CHN)	L 5–3	2 Q	Yao (CHN); L 15–13	did not advance			5
Chan Yui Chong	Individual Épée B	Demaude (FRA)	W 5–3	3 Q	Lemiashkevich (BLR); W 15–12	Jana (THA); L 15–14	Vasileva (RUS); W 15–13	did not advance	3rd place, bronze medalist(s)
Chan Yui Chong	Individual Épée B	Pozniak (UKR)	L 5–4	3 Q	Lemiashkevich (BLR); W 15–12	Jana (THA); L 15–14	Vasileva (RUS); W 15–13	did not advance	3rd place, bronze medalist(s)
Chan Yui Chong	Individual Épée B	Lemiashkevich (BLR)	W 5–4	3 Q	Lemiashkevich (BLR); W 15–12	Jana (THA); L 15–14	Vasileva (RUS); W 15–13	did not advance	3rd place, bronze medalist(s)
Chan Yui Chong	Individual Épée B	Makowska (POL)	L 5–0	3 Q	Lemiashkevich (BLR); W 15–12	Jana (THA); L 15–14	Vasileva (RUS); W 15–13	did not advance	3rd place, bronze medalist(s)

Athlete	Event	Quarterfinal	Semifinal	Bronze medal match	Final	
Athlete	Event	Opposition Score	Opposition Score	Opposition Score	Opposition Score	Rank
Yu Chui Yee; Chan Yui Chong; Fan Pui Shan	Women's Team Épée Open	Great Britain (GBR) (8); W 45–26	China (CHN) (5); L 45–42	Poland (POL) (3); W 45–26	did not advance	3rd place, bronze medalist(s)
