= Swimming at the 2012 Summer Paralympics – Men's 200 metre freestyle S14 =

Event at the 2012 Summer Paralympics

Men's 200m Freestyle S14 at the XIV Paralympic Games
- Venue: London Aquatics Centre
- Dates: 2 September 2012
- Competitors: 19 from 11 nations
- Winning time: 1:59.62

Medalists
1st place, gold medalist(s)		Jon Margeir Sverrisson	Iceland
2nd place, silver medalist(s)		Daniel Fox	Australia
3rd place, bronze medalist(s)		Cho Wonsang	South Korea

The men's 200m freestyle S14 event at the 2012 Summer Paralympics took place at the London Aquatics Centre on 2 September. There were three heats; the swimmers with the eight fastest times advanced to the final.

== Results ==
=== Heats ===
Competed from 09:54.

==== Heat 1 ====
Rank	Lane	Name	Nationality	Time	Notes
1	4	Daniel Pepper	Great Britain	2:01.94	Q, PR
2	5	Ben Procter	Great Britain	2:01.97	Q
3	3	Mitchell Kilduff	Australia	2:04.64	Q
4	6	Yasuhiro Tanaka	Japan	2:08.66	
5	7	Michael Heath	Canada	2:09.85	
6	2	Jung Yangmook	South Korea	2:09.98	

==== Heat 2 ====
Rank	Lane	Name	Nationality	Time	Notes
1	5	Jon Margeir Sverrisson	Iceland	2:00.32	Q, PR
2	4	Cho Wonsang	South Korea	2:00.47	Q
3	3	Craig Rodgie	Great Britain	2:05.59	
4	7	Au Kai Lun	Hong Kong	2:06.78	
5	6	Takuya Tsugawa	Japan	2:09.31	
6	2	Alberto Jesus Vera Moran	Venezuela	2:19.62	

==== Heat 3 ====
Rank	Lane	Name	Nationality	Time	Notes
1	4	Daniel Fox	Australia	2:00.11	Q, PR
2	5	Marc Evers	Netherlands	2:03.03	Q
3	3	Tang Wai Lok	Hong Kong	2:03.71	Q
4	2	Lee Tsun Sang	Hong Kong	2:06.56	
5	7	Andre Lehmann	Germany	2:07.42	
6	6	Yannick Vandeput	Belgium	2:07.47	
7	1	Lee In Kook	South Korea	2:08.18	

=== Final ===
Competed at 17:48.

Rank	Lane	Name	Nationality	Time	Notes
1st place, gold medalist(s)	5	Jon Margeir Sverrisson	Iceland	1:59.62	WR
2nd place, silver medalist(s)	4	Daniel Fox	Australia	1:59.79	OC
3rd place, bronze medalist(s)	3	Cho Wonsang	South Korea	1:59.93	AS
4	7	Marc Evers	Netherlands	2:00.76	
5	8	Mitchell Kilduff	Australia	2:01.09	
6	1	Tang Wai Lok	Hong Kong	2:02.89	
7	6	Daniel Pepper	Great Britain	2:03.27	
8	2	Ben Procter	Great Britain	2:03.30	

Q = qualified for final. WR = World Record. PR = Paralympic Record. AS = Asian Record. OC = Oceania Record.
