= Swimming at the 2012 Summer Paralympics – Men's 100 metre breaststroke SB14 =

Event at the 2012 Summer Paralympics

Men's 100m Breaststroke SB14 at the XIV Paralympic Games
- Venue: London Aquatics Centre
- Dates: 6 September 2012
- Competitors: 16 from 11 nations
- Winning time: 1:06.69

Medalists
1st place, gold medalist(s)		Yasuhiro Tanaka	Japan
2nd place, silver medalist(s)		Artem Pavlenko	Russia
3rd place, bronze medalist(s)		Marc Evers	Netherlands

The men's 100m breaststroke SB14 event at the 2012 Summer Paralympics took place at the London Aquatics Centre on 6 September. There were two heats; the swimmers with the eight fastest times advanced to the final.

== Results ==
=== Heats ===
Competed from 10:24.

==== Heat 1 ====
Rank	Lane	Name	Nationality	Time	Notes
1	3	Artem Pavlenko	Russia	1:08.08	Q, WR
2	4	Jung Yangmook	South Korea	1:10.16	Q
3	5	Daniel Pepper	Great Britain	1:11.27	Q
4	1	Au Kai Lun	Hong Kong	1:12.79	Q
5	6	Alberto Jesus Vera Moran	Venezuela	1:13.21	
6	7	Lee Tsun Sang	Hong Kong	1:13.87	
8	8	Tang Wai Lok	Hong Kong	1:17.21	

==== Heat 2 ====
Rank	Lane	Name	Nationality	Time	Notes
1	4	Yasuhiro Tanaka	Japan	1:07.08	Q, WR
2	5	Marc Evers	Netherlands	1:08.46	Q
3	3	Richard Eliason	Australia	1:09.92	Q
4	6	Aaron Moores	Great Britain	1:11.10	Q
5	7	Jon Margeir Sverrisson	Iceland	1:13.91	
6	2	Michael Heath	Canada	1:16.09	
7	8	Yannick Vandeput	Belgium	1:18.57	
8	1	Mitchell Kilduff	Australia	1:19.16	

=== Final ===
Competed at 18:24.

Rank	Lane	Name	Nationality	Time	Notes
1st place, gold medalist(s)	4	Yasuhiro Tanaka	Japan	1:06.69	WR
2nd place, silver medalist(s)	5	Artem Pavlenko	Russia	1:08.38	
3rd place, bronze medalist(s)	3	Marc Evers	Netherlands	1:08.43	
4	2	Jung Yangmook	South Korea	1:09.74	
5	6	Richard Eliason	Australia	1:09.96	
6	7	Aaron Moores	Great Britain	1:10.46	
7	1	Daniel Pepper	Great Britain	1:12.64	
8	8	Au Kai Lun	Hong Kong	1:13.54	

Q = qualified for final. WR = World Record.
