= Swimming at the 2012 Summer Paralympics – Men's 100 metre backstroke S14 =

Event at the 2012 Summer Paralympics

Men's 100 metre backstroke S14 at the XIV Paralympic Games
- Venue: London Aquatics Centre
- Dates: 31 August 2012
- Competitors: 17 from 11 nations

Medalists
1st place, gold medalist(s)		Marc Evers	Netherlands
2nd place, silver medalist(s)		Aaron Moores	Great Britain
3rd place, bronze medalist(s)		Au Kai Lun	Hong Kong

The men's 100 metre backstroke SB14 event at the 2012 Paralympic Games took place on 31 August, at the London Aquatics Centre.

Three heats were held. The swimmers with the eight fastest times advanced to the final.

== Heats ==
=== Heat 1 ===
Rank	Lane	Name	Nationality	Time	Notes
1	4	Lee In Kook	South Korea	1:03.32	Q
2	5	Ben Procter	Great Britain	1:06.01	Q
3	3	Lee Tsun Sang	Hong Kong	1:06.25	
4	6	Takuya Tsugawa	Japan	1:06.77	
5	7	Mitchell Kilduff	Australia	1:08.49	

=== Heat 2 ===
Rank	Lane	Name	Nationality	Time	Notes
1	4	Marc Evers	Netherlands	1:03.42	Q
2	6	Aaron Moores	Great Britain	1:04.80	Q
3	3	Au Kai Lun	Hong Kong	1:05.69	Q
4	5	Tang Wai Lok	Hong Kong	1:06.11	Q
5	2	Michael Heath	Canada	1:08.42	
6	7	Jon Margeir Sverrisson	Iceland	1:10.72	

=== Heat 3 ===
Rank	Lane	Name	Nationality	Time	Notes
1	4	Tomoyuki Nagao	Japan	1:05.00	Q
2	6	Daniel Fox	Australia	1:05.58	Q
3	3	Alberto Jesus Vera Moran	Venezuela	1:06.67	
4	5	Craig Rodgie	Great Britain	1:07.03	
5	2	Yannick Vandeput	Belgium	1:09.02	
6	7	Andre Lehmann	Germany	1:09.95	

== Final ==
Rank	Lane	Name	Nationality	Time	Notes
1st place, gold medalist(s)	4	Marc Evers	Netherlands	1:01.85	WR
2nd place, silver medalist(s)	5	Aaron Moores	Great Britain	1:04.44	
3rd place, bronze medalist(s)	3	Au Kai Lun	Hong Kong	1:04.53	
4	2	Daniel Fox	Australia	1:05.76	
5	7	Ben Procter	Great Britain	1:05.88	
6	1	Takuya Tsugawa	Japan	1:05.89	
7	6	Tang Wai Lok	Hong Kong	1:06.31	
8	8	Tomoyuki Nagao	Japan	1:07.25	
