= Wheelchair fencing at the 2012 Summer Paralympics – Men's épée B =

Men's Épée B at the XIV Paralympic Games
- Venue: ExCeL Exhibition Centre
- Dates: 5 September 2012
- Competitors: 15 from 11 nations

Medalists
1st place, gold medalist(s)		Jovane Silva Guissone	Brazil
2nd place, silver medalist(s)		Tam Chik Sum	Hong Kong
3rd place, bronze medalist(s)		Alim Latrèche	France

The men's épée category B fencing competition at the 2012 Summer Paralympics was held on 5 September 2012 at the ExCeL Exhibition Centre in London. This class was for athletes who had good trunk control and their fencing arm was not affected by their impairment.

== Schedule ==
All times are British Summer Time (UTC+1)

Date	Time	Round
5 September 2012	12:00	Qualification
5 September 2012	15:00	Round of 16
5 September 2012	15:45	Quarterfinals
5 September 2012	17:45	Semifinals
5 September 2012	18:30	Final

== Competition format ==
The tournament started with a group phase round-robin followed by a knockout stage. During a qualification round-robin, bouts last a maximum of three minutes, or until one athlete has scored five hits. There is then a knockout phase, in which bouts last a maximum of nine minutes (three periods of three minutes), or until one athlete has scored 15 hits.

== Results ==
=== Qualification ===
==== Group A ====
Athlete	B	V	V/B	HS	HD	Belarus (BLR)	Canada (CAN)	Brazil (BRA)	Poland (POL)	Russia (RUS)
Mikalai Bezyazychny (BLR)	4	4	1.00	20	7	—	5–0	5–1	5–2	5–4
Pierre Mainville (CAN)	4	2	0.50	14	15	1–5	—	5–2	3–5	5–3
Jovane Silva Guissone (BRA)	4	2	0.50	12	15	0–5	2–5	—	5–2	5–3
Grzegorz Pluta (POL)	4	2	0.50	14	17	2–5	5–3	2–5	—	5–4
Alexandr Kurzin (RUS)	4	0	0	14	20	4–5	3–5	3–5	4–5	—

==== Group B ====
Athlete	B	V	V/B	HS	HD	France (FRA)	China (CHN)	Russia (RUS)	Belarus (BLR)	Hong Kong (HKG)
Marc-André Cratère (FRA)	4	4	1.00	20	7	—	5–3	5–2	5–1	5–1
Hu Daoliang (CHN)	4	3	0.50	15	12	3–5	—	5–3	5–4	2–0
Alexander Kuzyukov (RUS)	4	2	0.50	15	17	2–5	3–5	—	5–3	5–4
Viktar Lemiashkevich (BLR)	4	1	0.25	13	18	1–5	4–5	3–5	—	5–3
Chung Ting Ching (HKG)	4	0	0	8	17	1–5	0–2	4–5	3–5	—

==== Group C ====
Athlete	B	V	V/B	HS	HD	France (FRA)	Iraq (IRQ)	Hong Kong (HKG)	United States (USA)	Argentina (ARG)
Alim Latrèche (FRA)	4	3	0.75	16	15	—	2–5	5–4	5–2	5–4
Ammar Ali (IRQ)	4	3	0.75	19	10	5–2	—	4–5	5–3	5–0
Tam Chik Sum (HKG)	4	3	0.75	19	15	4–5	5–4	—	5–4	5–2
Ryan Estep (USA)	4	1	0.25	14	18	2–5	3–5	4–5	—	5–3
José Palavecino (ARG)	4	0	0	10	19	4–5	0–5	2–5	3–5	—

==== Finals ====
Round of 16
Grzegorz Pluta (POL)	5
Alexander Kuzyukov (RUS)	8
Pierre Mainville (CAN)	6
Jovane Silva Guissone (BRA)	15

Quarter-finals
Mikalai Bezyazychny (BLR)	15
Alexander Kuzyukov (RUS)	10
Hu Daoliang (CHN)	9
Tam Chik Sum (HKG)	15
Ammar Ali (IRQ)	6
Alim Latrèche (FRA)	15
Jovane Silva Guissone (BRA)	15
Marc-André Cratère (FRA)	11

Semi-finals
Mikalai Bezyazychny (BLR)	11
Tam Chik Sum (HKG)	15
Alim Latrèche (FRA)	11
Jovane Silva Guissone (BRA)	15

Final
Tam Chik Sum (HKG)	14
Jovane Silva Guissone (BRA)	15
Third place match
Mikalai Bezyazychny (BLR)	11
Alim Latrèche (FRA)	15
