= Maryanovka =

Maryanovka (Russian: Марьяновка) is the name of several inhabited localities in Russia.

Urban localities

- Maryanovka, Omsk Oblast, a work settlement in Maryanovsky District of Omsk Oblast

Rural localities

- Maryanovka, Amur Oblast, a selo in Romanovsky Rural Settlement of Oktyabrsky District of Amur Oblast
- Maryanovka, Republic of Bashkortostan, a village in Stepanovsky Selsoviet of Aurgazinsky District of the Republic of Bashkortostan
- Maryanovka, Republic of Mordovia, a selo in Maryanovsky Selsoviet of Bolshebereznikovsky District of the Republic of Mordovia
- Maryanovka, Primorsky Krai, a selo in the Kirovsky District of Primorsky Krai
- Maryanovka, Republic of Tatarstan, a settlement in Leninogorsky District of the Republic of Tatarstan
