= Wheelchair fencing at the 2008 Summer Paralympics – Men's épée B =

Men's épée B at the XIII Paralympic Games
- Paralympic Wheelchair fencing
- Venue: Olympic Green Convention Center
- Dates: 15 September
- Competitors: 18 from 14 nations

Medalists
| 1st place, gold medalist(s) | | Hu Daoliang | China |
| 2nd place, silver medalist(s) | | Mikalai Bezyazychny | Belarus |
| 3rd place, bronze medalist(s) | | Serhiy Shenkevych | Ukraine |

The men's épée B wheelchair fencing competition at the 2008 Summer Paralympics was held on 15 September at the Olympic Green Convention Center.

The competition began with a preliminary stage where fencers were divided into three pools and played a round robin tournament. In this stage, the winner of a bout was the first person to score five hits or the person with the highest score at the end of four minutes. Next was a knock-out stage, where fencers competed in three three-minute bouts with a one-minute break between each. The winner was the first to reach fifteen hits, or the one with the highest score at the end of the last bout. In the event of a tie, another one-minute bout was held, with the winner being the first to score a hit.

The event was won by Hu Daoliang, representing China.

== Results ==
=== Preliminaries ===
==== Pool A ====
| Rank | Competitor | MP | W | L | Points | UKR | BLR | KOR | ITA | CHN | POL |
|---|---|---|---|---|---|---|---|---|---|---|---|
| 1 | Serhiy Shenkevych (UKR) | 5 | 4 | 1 | 24:17 | x | 4:5 | 5:1 | 5:3 | 5:4 | 5:4 |
| 2 | Mikalai Bezyazychny (BLR) | 5 | 4 | 1 | 24:19 | 5:4 | x | 5:3 | 4:5 | 5:4 | 5:3 |
| 3 | Kim Gi Hong (KOR) | 5 | 3 | 2 | 19:19 | 1:5 | 3:5 | x | 5:2 | 5:4 | 5:3 |
| 4 | Gerardo Mari (ITA) | 5 | 2 | 3 | 19:21 | 3:5 | 5:4 | 2:5 | x | 4:5 | 5:2 |
| 5 | Ding Baozhong (CHN) | 5 | 1 | 4 | 21:24 | 4:5 | 4:5 | 4:5 | 5:4 | x | 4:5 |
| 6 | Grzegorz Pluta (POL) | 5 | 1 | 4 | 17:24 | 4:5 | 3:5 | 3:5 | 2:5 | 5:4 | x |

==== Pool B ====
| Rank | Competitor | MP | W | L | Points | FRA | USA | CAN | CHN | ESP | JPN |
|---|---|---|---|---|---|---|---|---|---|---|---|
| 1 | Marc-André Cratère (FRA) | 5 | 4 | 1 | 23:12 | x | 3:5 | 5:1 | 5:3 | 5:2 | 5:1 |
| 2 | Scott Rodgers (USA) | 5 | 4 | 1 | 23:16 | 5:3 | x | 3:5 | 5:4 | 5:3 | 5:1 |
| 3 | Pierre Mainville (CAN) | 5 | 4 | 1 | 21:17 | 1:5 | 5:3 | x | 5:4 | 5:2 | 5:3 |
| 4 | Hu Daoliang (CHN) | 5 | 2 | 3 | 21:15 | 3:5 | 4:5 | 4:5 | x | 5:0 | 5:0 |
| 5 | Carlos Soler (ESP) | 5 | 1 | 4 | 12:21 | 2:5 | 3:5 | 2:5 | 0:5 | x | 5:1 |
| 6 | Toyoaki Hisakawa (JPN) | 5 | 0 | 5 | 6:25 | 1:5 | 1:5 | 3:5 | 0:5 | 1:5 | x |

==== Pool C ====
| Rank | Competitor | MP | W | L | Points | UKR | FRA | RUS | GRE | USA | KUW |
|---|---|---|---|---|---|---|---|---|---|---|---|
| 1 | Andrii Komar (UKR) | 5 | 4 | 1 | 23:15 | x | 3:5 | 5:3 | 5:2 | 5:3 | 5:2 |
| 2 | Alim Latrèche (FRA) | 5 | 4 | 1 | 21:16 | 5:3 | x | 1:5 | 5:3 | 5:3 | 5:2 |
| 3 | Vladimir Poleshchuk (RUS) | 5 | 3 | 2 | 20:15 | 3:5 | 5:1 | x | 2:5 | 5:3 | 5:1 |
| 4 | Emmanouil Bogdos (GRE) | 5 | 2 | 3 | 19:21 | 2:5 | 3:5 | 5:2 | x | 4:5 | 5:4 |
| 5 | Benjy Williams (USA) | 5 | 2 | 3 | 19:23 | 3:5 | 3:5 | 3:5 | 5:4 | x | 5:4 |
| 6 | Abdulwahab Alsaedi (KUW) | 5 | 0 | 5 | 13:25 | 2:5 | 2:5 | 1:5 | 4:5 | 4:5 | x |

=== Competition bracket ===
Round of 16
Vladimir Poleshchuk (RUS) | 13
Kim Gi Hong (KOR) | 15
Mikalai Bezyazychny (BLR) | 15
Emmanouil Bogdos (GRE) | 7
Benjy Williams (USA) | 2
Scott Rodgers (USA) | 15
Serhiy Shenkevych (UKR) | 15
Ding Baozhong (CHN) | 9
Alim Latrèche (FRA) | 15
Gerardo Mari (ITA) | 10
Pierre Mainville (CAN) | 8
Hu Daoliang (CHN) | 15

Quarterfinals
Marc-André Cratère (FRA) | 15
Kim Gi Hong (KOR) | 13
Mikalai Bezyazychny (BLR) | 15
Scott Rodgers (USA) | 4
Serhiy Shenkevych (UKR) | 15
Alim Latrèche (FRA) | 13
Hu Daoliang (CHN) | 15
Andrii Komar (UKR) | 10

Semifinals
Marc-André Cratère (FRA) | 6
Mikalai Bezyazychny (BLR) | 15
Serhiy Shenkevych (UKR) | 9
Hu Daoliang (CHN) | 15

Final
Mikalai Bezyazychny (BLR) | 13
Hu Daoliang (CHN) | 15
Third place
Marc-André Cratère (FRA) | 12
Serhiy Shenkevych (UKR) | 15
