= Wheelchair fencing at the 2012 Summer Paralympics – Men's sabre B =

Men's sabre B at the XIV Paralympic Games
- Paralympic Wheelchair fencing
- Venue: ExCeL Exhibition Centre
- Dates: 6 September
- Competitors: 15 from 11 nations

Medalists
| 1st place, gold medalist(s) | | Grzegorz Pluta | Poland |
| 2nd place, silver medalist(s) | | Marc-André Cratère | France |
| 3rd place, bronze medalist(s) | | Alessio Sarri | Italy |

The men's sabre B wheelchair fencing competition at the 2012 Summer Paralympics was held on 6 September at the ExCeL Exhibition Centre.

The tournament started with a group phase round-robin followed by a knockout stage.

During a qualification round-robin, bouts lasted a maximum of three minutes, or until one athlete had scored five hits. There was then a knockout phase, in which bouts lasted a maximum of nine minutes (three periods of three minutes), or until one athlete had scored 15 hits.

The event was won by Grzegorz Pluta, representing Poland.

== Results ==
=== Preliminaries ===
==== Pool A ====
| Rank | Competitor | MP | W | L | Points | UKR | RUS | ITA | GRE | AUT |
|---|---|---|---|---|---|---|---|---|---|---|
| 1 | Anton Datsko (UKR) | 4 | 3 | 1 | 17:10 | x | 5:2 | 2:5 | 5:1 | 5:2 |
| 2 | Marat Yusupov (RUS) | 4 | 3 | 1 | 17:12 | 2:5 | x | 5:4 | 5:2 | 5:1 |
| 3 | Alessio Sarri (ITA) | 4 | 2 | 2 | 17:12 | 5:2 | 4:5 | x | 3:5 | 5:0 |
| 4 | Emmanouil Bogdos (GRE) | 4 | 2 | 2 | 13:15 | 1:5 | 2:5 | 5:3 | x | 5:2 |
| 5 | Manfred Bohm (AUT) | 4 | 0 | 4 | 5:20 | 2:5 | 1:5 | 0:5 | 2:5 | x |

==== Pool B ====
| Rank | Competitor | MP | W | L | Points | POL | CAN | FRA | ESP | HKG |
|---|---|---|---|---|---|---|---|---|---|---|
| 1 | Grzegorz Pluta (POL) | 4 | 4 | 0 | 20:8 | x | 5:1 | 5:3 | 5:2 | 5:2 |
| 2 | Pierre Mainville (CAN) | 4 | 3 | 1 | 16:11 | 1:5 | x | 5:1 | 5:2 | 5:3 |
| 3 | Marc-André Cratère (FRA) | 4 | 2 | 2 | 14:13 | 3:5 | 1:5 | x | 5:2 | 5:1 |
| 4 | Carlos Soler Marquez (ESP) | 4 | 1 | 3 | 11:18 | 2:5 | 2:5 | 2:5 | x | 5:3 |
| 5 | Tam Chik Sum (HKG) | 4 | 0 | 4 | 9:20 | 2:5 | 3:5 | 1:5 | 3:5 | x |

==== Pool C ====
| Rank | Competitor | MP | W | L | Points | FRA | GRE | RUS | POL | USA |
|---|---|---|---|---|---|---|---|---|---|---|
| 1 | Laurent Francois (FRA) | 4 | 4 | 0 | 20:6 | x | 5:2 | 5:2 | 5:1 | 5:1 |
| 2 | Panagiotis Triantafyllou (GRE) | 4 | 2 | 2 | 16:13 | 2:5 | x | 5:3 | 4:5 | 5:0 |
| 3 | Alexandr Kurzin (RUS) | 4 | 2 | 2 | 15:15 | 2:5 | 3:5 | x | 5:2 | 5:3 |
| 4 | Adrian Castro (POL) | 4 | 2 | 2 | 13:17 | 1:5 | 5:4 | 2:5 | x | 5:3 |
| 5 | Joseph Brinson (USA) | 4 | 0 | 4 | 7:20 | 1:5 | 0:5 | 3:5 | 3:5 | x |

=== Competition bracket ===
Round of 16
Alexandr Kurzin (RUS) | 9
Marc-André Cratère (FRA) | 15
Panagiotis Triantafyllou (GRE) | 15
Emmanouil Bogdos (GRE) | 11

Quarterfinals
Laurent Francois (FRA) | 9
Marc-André Cratère (FRA) | 15
Pierre Mainville (CAN) | 9
Marat Yusupov (RUS) | 15
Anton Datsko (UKR) | 13
Alessio Sarri (ITA) | 15
Panagiotis Triantafyllou (GRE) | 9
Grzegorz Pluta (POL) | 15

Semifinals
Marc-André Cratère (FRA) | 15
Marat Yusupov (RUS) | 13
Alessio Sarri (ITA) | 10
Grzegorz Pluta (POL) | 15

Final
Marc-André Cratère (FRA) | 8
Grzegorz Pluta (POL) | 15
Third place
Marat Yusupov (RUS) | 7
Alessio Sarri (ITA) | 15
