= Swimming at the 2016 Summer Paralympics – Men's 100 metre breaststroke SB14 =

Men's 100 metre breaststroke SB14 at the XV Paralympic Games
- Venue: Olympic Aquatics Stadium
- Dates: 14 September 2016
- Competitors: 16 from 12 nations

Medalists
1st place, gold medalist(s)		Aaron Moores	Great Britain
2nd place, silver medalist(s)		Scott Quin	Great Britain
3rd place, bronze medalist(s)		Marc Evers	Netherlands

The men's 100 metre breaststroke SB14 event at the 2016 Paralympic Games took place on 14 September 2016, at the Olympic Aquatics Stadium. Two heats were held. The swimmers with the eight fastest times advanced to the final.

== Heats ==
=== Heat 1 ===
9:54 14 September 2016:

Rank	Lane	Name	Nationality	Time	Notes
1	4	Marc Evers	Netherlands	1:07.67	Q
2	5	Yasuhiro Tanaka	Japan	1:08.65	Q
3	3	Adam Ismael Wenham	Norway	1:09.59	Q
4	2	Taiga Hayashida	Japan	1:10.70	Q
5	6	Jon Margeir Sverrisson	Iceland	1:12.27	
6	1	Won Sang Cho	South Korea	1:15.87	
7	7	Alberto Vera	Venezuela	1:15.91	
8	8	Liam Schluter	Australia	1:16.56	

=== Heat 2 ===
9:58 14 September 2016:

Rank	Lane	Name	Nationality	Time	Notes
1	5	Scott Quin	Great Britain	1:06.65	PR Q
2	4	Aaron Moores	Great Britain	1:07.25	Q
3	3	Yang Mook Jung	South Korea	1:10.89	Q
4	2	Elian Araya	Argentina	1:10.96	Q
5	6	Wa Kit Choi	Hong Kong	1:11.62	
6	7	Shinichi Hirota	Japan	1:11.92	
7	1	Gordie Michie	Canada	1:12.01	
8	8	Felipe Vila Real	Brazil	1:16.87	

== Final ==
18:06 14 September 2016:

Rank	Lane	Name	Nationality	Time	Notes
1st place, gold medalist(s)	5	Aaron Moores	Great Britain	1:06.67	
2nd place, silver medalist(s)	4	Scott Quin	Great Britain	1:06.70	
3rd place, bronze medalist(s)	3	Marc Evers	Netherlands	1:07.64	
4	6	Yasuhiro Tanaka	Japan	1:07.82	
5	2	Adam Ismael Wenham	Norway	1:08.44	
6	1	Yang Mook Jung	South Korea	1:10.21	
7	7	Taiga Hayashida	Japan	1:11.26	
8	8	Elian Araya	Argentina	1:11.60	
