= Boccia at the 2012 Summer Paralympics – Individual BC4 =

Boccia – Individual BC4 at the XIV Paralympic Games
- Venue: ExCeL London
- Dates: 5 September 2012 – 8 September 2012
- Competitors: 16 from 10 nations

Medalists
1st place, gold medalist(s)		Dirceu Pinto	Brazil
2nd place, silver medalist(s)		Zheng Yuansen	China
3rd place, bronze medalist(s)		Eliseu dos Santos	Brazil

The individual BC4 boccia event at the 2012 Summer Paralympics was contested from 5 to 8 September at ExCeL London.

== Seeding matches ==
One preliminary match was held to determine the participants' seed for the tournament bracket.

Match 58
1	Jose Dueso Villar (ESP)	0
2	Yuansen Zheng (CHN)	9

== Draw ==
=== Finals ===
Semifinals
Eliseu dos Santos (BRA)	2
Dirceu Pinto (BRA)	4
Yuansen Zheng (CHN)	12
Stephen McGuire (GBR)	0

Gold medal match
Dirceu Pinto (BRA)	3*
Yuansen Zheng (CHN)	3
Bronze medal match
Eliseu dos Santos (BRA)	5
Stephen McGuire (GBR)	3

=== 5th–8th place matches ===
Semifinals
Yuk Wing Leung (HKG)	3
Vivian (wai Yan) Lau (HKG)	2
Peter McGuire (GBR)	4
Radek Procházka (CZE)	6

5th–6th place match
Yuk Wing Leung (HKG)	6
Radek Procházka (CZE)	2
7th–8th place match
Vivian (wai Yan) Lau (HKG)	3*
Peter McGuire (GBR)	3

=== Top half ===
First round
Eliseu dos Santos (BRA)	8
Josh vander Vies (CAN)	1
Domingos Vieira (POR)	0
Yuk Wing Leung (HKG)	10
Dirceu Pinto (BRA)	4
Leos Lacina (CZE)	2
Peter McGuire (GBR)	4
Marco Dispaltro (CAN)	3

Quarterfinals
Eliseu dos Santos (BRA)	4
Yuk Wing Leung (HKG)	2
Dirceu Pinto (BRA)	3*
Peter McGuire (GBR)	3

Semifinals
Eliseu dos Santos (BRA)	2
Dirceu Pinto (BRA)	4

=== Bottom half ===
First round
Yuansen Zheng (CHN)	7
Robert Durkovic (SVK)	1
Sataporn Yoojaroen (THA)	1
Vivian (wai Yan) Lau (HKG)	4
Jose Dueso Villar (ESP)	4
Radek Procházka (CZE)	6
Martin Streharsky (SVK)	1
Stephen McGuire (GBR)	6

Quarterfinals
Yuansen Zheng (CHN)	3
Vivian (wai Yan) Lau (HKG)	1
Radek Procházka (CZE)	3
Stephen McGuire (GBR)	5

Semifinals
Yuansen Zheng (CHN)	12
Stephen McGuire (GBR)	0

== Final ranking ==
1st place, gold medalist(s)	Dirceu Pinto (BRA)
2nd place, silver medalist(s)	Yuansen Zheng (CHN)
3rd place, bronze medalist(s)	Eliseu dos Santos (BRA)
4	Stephen McGuire (GBR)
5	Yuk Wing Leung (HKG)
6	Radek Procházka (CZE)
7	Vivian (wai Yan) Lau (HKG)
8	Peter McGuire (GBR)
