= 2013 IPC Swimming World Championships – Men's 200 metre medley =

The men's 200 metre medley at the 2013 IPC Swimming World Championships was held at the Parc Jean Drapeau Aquatic Complex in Montreal from 12 to 18 August.

== Medalists ==
| Class | Gold | Silver | Bronze |
|---|---|---|---|
| SM5 | Daniel Dias; Brazil | Andrew Mullen; United Kingdom | Antonios Tsapatakis; Greece |
| SM6 | Sascha Kindred; United Kingdom | Talisson Glock; Brazil | Xu Qing; China |
| SM7 | Matthew Levy; Australia | Wang Jingang; China | Oleksandr Komarov; Ukraine |
| SM8 | Oliver Hynd; United Kingdom | Konstantin Lisenkov; Russia | Wang Jiachao; China |
| SM9 | Matthew Cowdrey; Australia | Andriy Kalyna; Ukraine | Federico Morlacchi; Italy |
| SM10 | Benoit Huot; Canada | Andre Brasil; Brazil | Ian Jaryd Silverman; United States |
| SM11 | Israel Oliver; Spain | Oleksandr Mashchenko; Ukraine | Keiichi Kimura; Japan |
| SM12 | Danylo Chufarov; Ukraine | Aleksandr Nevolin-Svetov; Russia | Sergii Klippert; Ukraine |
| SM13 | Ihar Boki; Belarus | Iaroslav Denysenko; Ukraine | Roman Dubovoy; Russia |
| SM14 | Marc Evers; Netherlands | Daniel Pepper; United Kingdom | Ben Procter; United Kingdom |

== See also ==
- List of IPC world records in swimming
