= Maryanovsky =

Maryanovsky (masculine), Maryanovskaya (feminine), or Maryanovskoye (neuter) may refer to:

- Maryanovsky District, a district of Omsk Oblast, Russia
- Maryanovsky (rural locality), a rural locality (a settlement) in Omsk Oblast, Russia
