= Ben Procter =

Ben Procter may refer to:

- Ben Procter (swimmer), British Paralympic swimmer
- Ben H. Procter, American historian
- Ben Procter (production designer), American art director and production designer
