= Yeung Chi Ka =

Yeung Chi Ka may refer to:

- Yeung Chi Ka (table tennis) (楊賜嘉; born 1988), Hong Kong female para table tennis player
- Yeung Chi Ka (fencer) (楊子加; born 1994), Hong Kong male foil fencer
