= Wheelchair fencing at the 2012 Summer Paralympics – Men's foil B =

Men's foil B at the XIV Paralympic Games
- Paralympic Wheelchair fencing
- Venue: ExCeL Exhibition Centre
- Dates: 4 September
- Competitors: 15 from 12 nations

Medalists
1st place, gold medalist(s)		Hu Daoliang	China
2nd place, silver medalist(s)		Anton Datsko	Ukraine
3rd place, bronze medalist(s)		Alim Latreche	France

The men's foil B wheelchair fencing competition at the 2012 Summer Paralympics was held on 4 September at the ExCeL Exhibition Centre.

The tournament started with a group phase round-robin followed by a knockout stage.

During a qualification round-robin, bouts lasted a maximum of three minutes, or until one athlete had scored five hits. There was then a knockout phase, in which bouts lasted a maximum of nine minutes (three periods of three minutes), or until one athlete had scored 15 hits.

The event was won by Hu Daoliang, representing China.

== Results ==
=== Preliminaries ===
==== Pool A ====
Rank	Competitor	MP	W	L	Points	UKR	BRA	HKG	ITA	POL
1	Anton Datsko (UKR)	4	3	1	16:9	x	1:5	5:2	5:0	5:2
2	Jovane Silva Guissone (BRA)	4	3	1	18:13	5:1	x	3:5	5:4	5:3
3	Chung Ting Ching (HKG)	4	2	2	16:16	2:5	5:3	x	4:5	5:3
4	Marco Cima (ITA)	4	2	2	14:17	0:5	4:5	5:4	x	5:3
5	Zbigniew Wyganowski (POL)	4	0	4	11:20	2:5	3:5	3:5	3:5	x

==== Pool B ====
Rank	Competitor	MP	W	L	Points	FRA	CHN	HUN	RUS	USA
1	Alim Latreche (FRA)	4	4	0	20:7	x	5:0	5:4	5:2	5:1
2	Hu Daoliang (CHN)	4	3	1	15:11	0:5	x	5:3	5:1	5:2
3	Pál Szekeres (HUN)	4	2	2	17:14	4:5	3:5	x	5:4	5:0
4	Timur Khamatshin (RUS)	4	1	3	12:19	2:5	1:5	4:5	x	5:4
5	Gerard Moreno (USA)	4	0	4	7:20	1:5	2:5	0:5	4:5	x

==== Pool C ====
Rank	Competitor	MP	W	L	Points	FRA	RUS	POL	BLR	ARG
1	Laurent Francois (FRA)	4	4	0	20:5	x	5:3	5:1	5:1	5:0
2	Marat Yusupov (RUS)	4	3	1	18:7	3:5	x	5:0	5:2	5:0
3	Piotr Czop (POL)	4	2	2	11:16	1:5	0:5	x	5:4	5:2
4	Mikalai Bezyazychny (BLR)	4	1	3	12:15	1:5	2:5	4:5	x	5:0
5	Jose Palavecino (ARG)	4	0	4	2:20	0:5	0:5	2:5	0:5	x

=== Competition bracket ===
Round of 16
Marco Cima (ITA)	15
Chung Ting Ching (HKG)	13
Pál Szekeres (HUN)	15
Piotr Czop (POL)	5

Quarterfinals
Laurent Francois (FRA)	14
Marco Cima (ITA)	15
Jovane Silva Guissone (BRA)	5
Anton Datsko (UKR)	15
Marat Yusupov (RUS)	13
Hu Daoliang (CHN)	15
Pál Szekeres (HUN)	11
Alim Latreche (FRA)	15

Semifinals
Marco Cima (ITA)	3
Anton Datsko (UKR)	15
Hu Daoliang (CHN)	15
Alim Latreche (FRA)	9

Final
Anton Datsko (UKR)	10
Hu Daoliang (CHN)	15
Third place
Marco Cima (ITA)	11
Alim Latreche (FRA)	15
