= Swimming at the 2016 Summer Paralympics – Men's 100 metre breaststroke =

The men's 100 m breaststroke swimming events for the 2016 Summer Paralympics took place at the Olympic Aquatics Stadium from 8 to 17 September. A total of eleven events were contested for different classifications.

== Competition format ==
Each event consisted of two rounds: heats and final. The top eight swimmers overall in the heats progressed to the final. If there were less than eight swimmers in an event, no heats were held and all swimmers qualify for the final.

== Results ==
=== SB4 ===
Rank	Lane	Name	Nationality	Time	Notes
1st place, gold medalist(s)	2	Junsheng Li	China	1:35.96	
2nd place, silver medalist(s)	3	Daniel Dias	Brazil	1:36.13	
3rd place, bronze medalist(s)	5	Moisés Fuentes	Colombia	1:37.40	
4	4	Antonios Tsapatakis	Greece	1:37.69	
5	6	Ricardo Ten	Spain	1:38.07	
6	1	Thanh Trung Nguyen	Vietnam	1:49.67	
7	8	Andrea Massussi	Italy	1:51.96	
	7	Shiwei He	China		DSQ

=== SB5 ===
17:30 11 September 2016:

Rank	Lane	Name	Nationality	Time	Notes
1st place, gold medalist(s)	4	Karl Forsman	Sweden	1:34.27	
2nd place, silver medalist(s)	5	Woo Geun Lim	South Korea	1:35.18	
3rd place, bronze medalist(s)	3	Pedro Rangel	Mexico	1:37.84	
4	2	Marco Maria Dolfin	Italy	1:38.27	
5	6	Roberto Rodrigues	Brazil	1:39.06	
6	7	Georgios Sfaltos	Greece	1:40.05	
7	1	Thanh Hai Do	Vietnam	1:40.31	
8	8	Adriano de Lima	Brazil	1:46.18	

=== SB6 ===
17:43 15 September 2016:

Rank	Lane	Name	Nationality	Time	Notes
1st place, gold medalist(s)	5	Ievgenii Bogodaiko	Ukraine	1:18.71	WR
2nd place, silver medalist(s)	4	Nelson Crispín	Colombia	1:21.47	
3rd place, bronze medalist(s)	3	Torben Schmidtke	Germany	1:23.47	
4	6	Andreas Skaar Bjornstad	Norway	1:26.07	
5	2	Yingbin Di	China	1:27.43	
6	7	Christoph Burkard	Germany	1:27.68	
7	1	Antoni Ponce Bertran	Spain	1:30.33	
8	8	Thijs van Hofweegen	Netherlands	1:32.36	

=== SB7 ===
17:30 10 September 2016:

Rank	Lane	Name	Nationality	Time	Notes
1st place, gold medalist(s)	4	Carlos Serrano Zárate	Colombia	1:12.50	WR
2nd place, silver medalist(s)	5	Blake Cochrane	Australia	1:18.66	
3rd place, bronze medalist(s)	6	Hong Yang	China	1:20.21	
4	3	Simon Boer	Netherlands	1:20.44	
5	7	Jianfeng Chen	China	1:21.37	
6	8	Rudy Garcia-Tolson	United States	1:22.45	
7	2	Tomotaro Nakamura	Japan	1:23.46	
8	1	Evan Austin	United States	1:23.55	

=== SB8 ===
17:30 14 September 2016:

Rank	Lane	Name	Nationality	Time	Notes
1st place, gold medalist(s)	4	Oscar Salguero Galisteo	Spain	1:11.11	
2nd place, silver medalist(s)	3	Federico Morlacchi	Italy	1:12.68	
3rd place, bronze medalist(s)	5	Andreas Onea	Austria	1:14.44	
4	7	Dalton Herendeen	United States	1:14.71	
5	2	Charles Rozoy	France	1:15.13	
6	6	Xueming Zhao	China	1:15.35	
7	1	Haijiao Xu	China	1:27.56	

=== SB9 ===
18:05 8 September 2016:

Rank	Lane	Name	Nationality	Time	Notes
1st place, gold medalist(s)	4	Kevin Paul	South Africa	1:04.86	
2nd place, silver medalist(s)	3	Denys Dubrov	Ukraine	1:05.10	
3rd place, bronze medalist(s)	5	Duncan van Haaren	Netherlands	1:06.54	
4	2	Furong Lin	China	1:07.12	
5	7	Rick Pendleton	Australia	1:08.27	
6	6	Dmytro Vanzenko	Ukraine	1:08.80	
7	8	James Leroux	Canada	1:10.03	
8	1	Shahin Izadyar	Iran	1:10.82	

=== SB11 ===
18:44 13 September 2016:

Rank	Lane	Name	Nationality	Time	Notes
1st place, gold medalist(s)	3	Bozun Yang	China	1:10.08	WR
2nd place, silver medalist(s)	6	Tharon Drake	United States	1:11.50	
3rd place, bronze medalist(s)	5	Keiichi Kimura	Japan	1:12.88	
4	4	Oleksandr Mashchenko	Ukraine	1:13.53	
5	2	Viktor Smyrnov	Ukraine	1:15.69	
6	7	Brayan Urbano Herrera	Colombia	1:19.27	
7	1	Miroslav Smrcka	Czech Republic	1:21.92	
8	8	Yunerki Ortega	Cuba	1:27.45	

=== SB12 ===
19:00 13 September 2016:

Rank	Lane	Name	Nationality	Time	Notes
1st place, gold medalist(s)	4	Uladzimir Izotau	Belarus	1:06.82	PR
2nd place, silver medalist(s)	5	Dzmitry Salei	Azerbaijan	1:08.80	
3rd place, bronze medalist(s)	7	Maksym Veraksa	Ukraine	1:09.00	
4	3	Anuar Akhmetov	Kazakhstan	1:09.17	
5	2	Sergii Klippert	Ukraine	1:10.55	
6	6	Daniel Giraldo Correa	Colombia	1:10.56	
7	1	Daniel Simon	Germany	1:12.08	
8	8	Fabrizio Sottile	Italy	1:13.92	

=== SB13 ===
18:02 11 September 2016:

Rank	Lane	Name	Nationality	Time	Notes
1st place, gold medalist(s)	4	Oleksii Fedyna	Ukraine	1:04.94	
1st place, gold medalist(s)	5	Firdavsbek Musabekov	Uzbekistan	1:04.94	
3rd place, bronze medalist(s)	3	Ihar Boki	Belarus	1:06.71	
4	6	Liam Bekric	Australia	1:08.70	
5	2	Guilherme Silva	Brazil	1:13.58	
6	1	Gerasimos Lignos	Greece	1:13.68	
7	8	Sean Russo	Australia	1:13.85	
8	7	Ivan Salguero Oteiza	Spain	1:13.95	

=== SB14 ===
18:06 14 September 2016:

Rank	Lane	Name	Nationality	Time	Notes
1st place, gold medalist(s)	5	Aaron Moores	Great Britain	1:06.67	
2nd place, silver medalist(s)	4	Scott Quin	Great Britain	1:06.70	
3rd place, bronze medalist(s)	3	Marc Evers	Netherlands	1:07.64	
4	6	Yasuhiro Tanaka	Japan	1:07.82	
5	2	Adam Ismael Wenham	Norway	1:08.44	
6	1	Yang Mook Jung	South Korea	1:10.21	
7	7	Taiga Hayashida	Japan	1:11.26	
8	8	Elian Araya	Argentina	1:11.60	
