= Daniel Pepper =

English Paralympic swimmer

Personal information
- Nationality: British
- Born: 2 March 1989 (age 37) Stockport, England

Sport
- Sport: Swimming
- Strokes: Freestyle, Breaststroke
- Club: Stockport Metro
- Coach: Rob Greenwood
Medal record
Men's swimming
Representing Great Britain
World Championships
Gold medal – first place	2010 Eindhoven	100m breaststroke SB14
Gold medal – first place	2010 Eindhoven	200m freestyle S14
Silver medal – second place	2013 Montreal	200m medley SM14
European Championships
Gold medal – first place	2009 Reykjavik	100m freestyle S14
Gold medal – first place	2009 Reykjavik	100m breaststroke SB14
Gold medal – first place	2009 Reykjavik	200m medley SM14
Gold medal – first place	2011 Berlin	200m freestyle S14
Silver medal – second place	2011 Berlin	100m breaststroke SB14

Daniel Pepper (born 2 March 1989) is an English Paralympian swimmer. Pepper competes in the S14 disability category in freestyle and breaststroke. He represented Great Britain at the 2012 Summer Paralympics in London, and in 2010 he won two gold medals at the World Championships in Eindhoven.

== Swimming career ==
Pepper began swimming at the age of four, as his parents were concerned about the canal that backed onto their home and wanted him to be able to swim. From practising in his local pool in Stockport he was spotted by the local swimming club and was invited to join. As Pepper has a learning disability similar to a dyslexia he was given an S14 parasport classification. His disability affects his ability to both retain instruction and co-ordination.

Pepper had hopes that the times he was recording would make him eligible for the British team at the 2004 Summer Paralympics in Athens, but after the basketball controversy at the 2000 Games, his classification was dropped from all events by the International Paralympic Committee (IPC). Pepper's initial reaction was one of anger and he decided to quit the sport, but a month later his coach persuaded him to return to training.

In 2009 the IPC decided to lift the ban on S14 entrants and Pepper was able to enter his first major international event, the 2009 IPC Swimming European Championships in Reykjavik, Iceland. There he entered three events, the 100m freestyle, 100m breaststroke and the 200m individual medley, taking gold in all three. The following year Pepper travelled to Eindhoven to represent Britain at the 2010 IPC Swimming World Championships entering two events. In the 100m breaststroke he recorded a time of 1:11.08 to take gold, a feat he repeated in the 200m freestyle making him a double world champion. He followed this in 2011 with his second European Championship, this time in Berlin. He failed to defend his 100m breaststroke, coming second to take silver, but victory in the 200m Freestyle gave him his fourth European Championship gold.

With the coming of the 2012 Summer Paralympics it was announced that several S14 events would be included in the swimming schedule for the first time. Pepper was part of the Great Britain team and was selected for two events, the 200m freestyle and the 100m breaststroke. Pepper swam in heat 1 of the 200m freestyle. As it was the inaugural race of this event under the S14 classification, by coming first with a time of 2:01.94, Pepper, by default, became the Paralympic champion. His reign was short lived as his time was beaten by Iceland's Jon Margeir Sverrisson in the very next heat. In the final Pepper was unable to improve on his first round heat time and finished seventh. In the breaststroke he was again placed in the first heat. Pepper finished third in a race which saw Russia's Artem Pavlenko set a new World record. As one of the slowest qualifiers, Pepper was placed in the unfavorable first lane and again finished seventh.

In 2013 Pepper returned to represent Great Britain, travelling to Montreal to compete in the 2013 IPC Swimming World Championships. He swam in two events taking the silver in 200m individual medley.

== Podcast ==
In 2021, Dan Pepper presented a six-part documentary, The Fake Paralympians, for the BBC World Service. The series investigated the events that led up to the ban on intellectual impairment sports at the Paralympics; a ban imposed after the Spanish basketball squad was found to only have two players with genuine disabilities at the Sydney 2000 Paralympics. The series also looked at the impact the nine-year ban had on Dan's career as well as other athletes with learning disabilities.

Dan said of the series: "I hope people learn that people with a learning impairment can do a variety of things - me presenting this show is obviously part of that. I'm hoping that people's views on intellectual disability sport will change, and I’m hoping to show what we've gone through to get to where we are today and where we would like to get to in the future.”
