= Table tennis at the 2012 Summer Paralympics – Women's individual – Class 11 =

Women's individual - Class 11 at the XIV Paralympic Games
- Venue: ExCeL London
- Dates: 30 August – 2 September 2012
- Competitors: 6 from 5 nations

Medalists
1st place, gold medalist(s)		Wong Ka Man	Hong Kong
2nd place, silver medalist(s)		Yeung Chi Ka	Hong Kong
3rd place, bronze medalist(s)		Anzhelika Kosacheva	Russia

The Women's individual table tennis – Class 11 tournament at the 2012 Summer Paralympics in London took place from 30 August to 3 September 2012 at ExCeL London. This class was for athletes with intellectual impairment.

In the preliminary stage, athletes competed in two groups of three. Top two in each group qualified for the semi-finals.

== Results ==
All times are local (BST/UTC+1)

=== Finals ===
Semifinals: 1 Sep 16:00
A1	Yeung Chi Ka (HKG)	11	4	11	11
B2	Anzhelika Kosacheva (RUS)	3	11	8	3
A2	Krystyna Siemieniecka (POL)	5	8	11	11	4
B1	Wong Ka Man (HKG)	11	11	8	8	11

Gold medal match: 2 Sep 09:30
A1	Yeung Chi Ka (HKG)	11	7	11	9	10
B1	Wong Ka Man (HKG)	6	11	8	11	12
Third place
B2	Anzhelika Kosacheva (RUS)	11	11	11	11
A2	Krystyna Siemieniecka (POL)	8	13	3	8

=== Preliminary round ===
Qualified for the semifinals

==== Group A ====
Athlete	Won	Lost	Games won	Points diff
Yeung Chi Ka (HKG)	2	0	6	+34
Krystyna Siemieniecka (POL)	1	1	3	+7
Iliane Faust (BRA)	0	2	0	-41

30 August, 13:00

Yeung Chi Ka (HKG)	11	11	11
Iliane Faust (BRA)	2	5	7

31 August, 11:00

Yeung Chi Ka (HKG)	11	11	11
Krystyna Siemieniecka (POL)	7	6	5

31 August, 20:40

Krystyna Siemieniecka (POL)	11	11	11
Iliane Faust (BRA)	1	6	4

==== Group B ====
Athlete	Won	Lost	Games won	Points diff
Wong Ka Man (HKG)	2	0	6	+23
Anzhelika Kosacheva (RUS)	1	1	4	+8
Victoria Bromley (GBR)	0	2	0	-31

30 August, 13:00

Anzhelika Kosacheva (RUS)	11	11	12
Victoria Bromley (GBR)	5	1	10

31 August, 11:00

Anzhelika Kosacheva (RUS)	11	6	5	10
Wong Ka Man (HKG)	8	11	11	12

31 August, 20:40

Wong Ka Man (HKG)	11	11	11
Victoria Bromley (GBR)	8	7	5
