= Swimming at the 2016 Summer Paralympics – Men's 100 metre backstroke S14 =

Men's 100 metre backstroke S14 at the XV Paralympic Games
- Venue: Olympic Aquatics Stadium
- Dates: 8 September 2016
- Competitors: 13 from 10 nations

Medalists
1st place, gold medalist(s)		In Kook Lee	South Korea
2nd place, silver medalist(s)		Marc Evers	Netherlands
3rd place, bronze medalist(s)		Takuya Tsugawa	Japan

The Men's 100 metre backstroke S14 event at the 2016 Paralympic Games took place on 8 September 2016, at the Olympic Aquatics Stadium. Two heats were held. The swimmers with the eight fastest times advanced to the final.

== Heats ==
=== Heat 1 ===
10:54 8 September 2016:

Rank	Lane	Name	Nationality	Time	Notes
1	4	Marc Evers	Netherlands	1:00.97	PR Q
2	5	Takuya Tsugawa	Japan	1:03.49	Q
3	2	Won Sang Cho	South Korea	1:04.93	Q
4	3	Gordie Michie	Canada	1:05.21	Q
5	6	Yannick Vandeput	Belgium	1:06.83	
6	7	Elian Araya	Argentina	1:10.16	

=== Heat 2 ===
10:58 8 September 2016:

Rank	Lane	Name	Nationality	Time	Notes
1	4	In Kook Lee	South Korea	1:00.81	PR Q
2	6	Daniel Fox	Australia	1:03.35	Q
3	5	Wai Lok Tang	Hong Kong	1:04.94	Q
4	7	Joshua Alford	Australia	1:06.69	Q
5	3	Aaron Moores	Great Britain	1:07.36	
6	1	Felipe Vila Real	Brazil	1:07.62	
7	2	Liam Schluter	Australia	1:07.64	

== Final ==
19:04 8 September 2016:

Rank	Lane	Name	Nationality	Time	Notes
1st place, gold medalist(s)	4	In Kook Lee	South Korea	59.82	PR
2nd place, silver medalist(s)	5	Marc Evers	Netherlands	1:00.63	
3rd place, bronze medalist(s)	6	Takuya Tsugawa	Japan	1:03.42	
4	7	Wai Lok Tang	Hong Kong	1:03.88	
5	1	Gordie Michie	Canada	1:05.12	
6	3	Daniel Fox	Australia	1:05.16	
7	2	Won Sang Cho	South Korea	1:05.66	
8	8	Joshua Alford	Australia	1:07.77	
