= Wheelchair fencing at the 2012 Summer Paralympics – Men's team open =

Men's Team Foil Open at the XIV Paralympic Games
- Venue: ExCeL Exhibition Centre
- Dates: 8 September 2012
- Competitors: 8 from 8 nations

Medalists
1st place, gold medalist(s)		Chen Yijun; Ye Ruyi; Hu Daoliang	China
2nd place, silver medalist(s)		Ludovic Lemoine; Alim Latrèche; Damien Tokatlian	France
3rd place, bronze medalist(s)		Wong Tang Tat; Chan Wing Kin; Chung Ting Ching	Hong Kong

The men's team foil open at the 2012 Summer Paralympics in London took place on 8 September 2012 at ExCeL Exhibition Centre.

== Schedule ==
All times are British Summer Time (UTC+1)

Date	Time	Round
8 September 2012	11:30	Quarterfinals
8 September 2012	13:00	Semifinals
8 September 2012	19:30	Final

== Competition format ==
The tournament ran in a knockout format. Teams progressed through the draw until the finals, which decided the winners of the gold medal.

== Results ==
Quarterfinals
1	Hong Kong (HKG)	45
8	Great Britain (GBR)	19
5	France (FRA)	45
4	Russia (RUS)	41
3	Italy (ITA)	45
6	Ukraine (UKR)	37
7	Hungary (HUN)	29
2	China (CHN)	45

Semifinals
1	Hong Kong (HKG)	41
5	France (FRA)	45
3	Italy (ITA)	19
2	China (CHN)	45

Finals
5	France (FRA)	32
2	China (CHN)	45
Bronze Medal Match
1	Hong Kong (HKG)	45
3	Italy (ITA)	42

Classification 5-8
8	Great Britain (GBR)	15
4	Russia (RUS)	45
6	Ukraine (UKR)	45
7	Hungary (HUN)	34

5th Place Match
4	Russia (RUS)	45
6	Ukraine (UKR)	37
7th Place Match
8	Great Britain (GBR)	12
7	Hungary (HUN)	45
