= Alexander Kuzyukov =

Russian wheelchair fencer

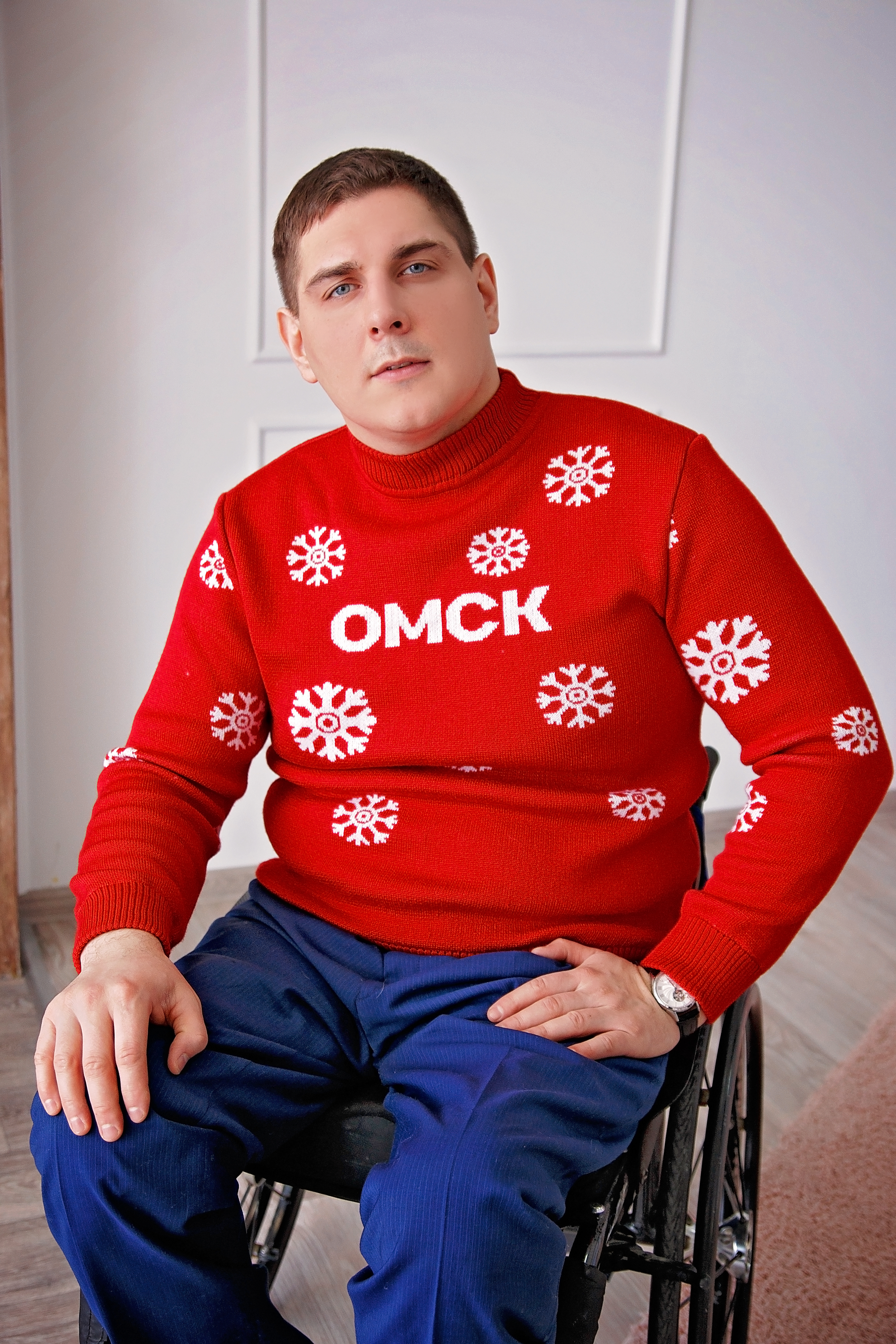

Personal information
- Native name: Александр Анатольевич Кузюков
- Full name: Alexander Anatolyevich Kuzyukov
- Born: August 7, 1987 (age 38) Maryanovka, Soviet Union

Fencing career
- Sport: Fencing
- Disability class: B
Medal record
Men's wheelchair fencing
Representing RPC
Paralympic Games
Gold medal – first place	2020 Tokyo	Individual épée B
Gold medal – first place	2020 Tokyo	Team épée A–B

Alexander Anatolyevich Kuzyukov (Russian: Александр Анатольевич Кузюков; born 7 August 1987) is a Russian wheelchair fencer, who won gold in the men's épée B event at the 2020 Summer Paralympics. He is a two-time Paralympic champion, three-time world champion, three-time European champion, and 23-time champion of Russia. He is a Merited Master of Sport of Russia.

== Early life ==
Kuzyukov was born 1987 in the workers' settlement of Maryanovka, Omsk Oblast. In childhood he practiced running, swimming and basketball. At the age of eighteen he had an employment injury on a construction site, receiving a spinal compression fracture and the loss of ability to walk. After the injury he decided to take up Paralympic fencing (sitting fencing). He attended the recently established section in Omsk, with his first coach being Valery Petrovich Purtov.

== Personal life ==
Kuzyukov enrolled at the Siberian Automobile and Highway University with a degree in "Economics and Management in Companies" and at the Siberian State Academy of Physical Culture and Sports with a degree in "Coach Instructor in Physical Culture and Sports".
