= Wheelchair fencing at the 2012 Summer Paralympics – Women's team open =

Women's Team Epée Open at the XIV Paralympic Games
- Venue: ExCeL
- Dates: 7 September 2012
- Competitors: 8 from 8 nations

Medalists
1st place, gold medalist(s)		Rong Jing; Yao Fang; Wu Baili	China
2nd place, silver medalist(s)		Veronika Juhász; Zsuzsanna Krajnyák; Gyöngyi Dani	Hungary
3rd place, bronze medalist(s)		Fan Pui Shan; Yu Chui Yee; Chan Yui Chong	Hong Kong

The Women's team épée open at the 2012 Summer Paralympics in London took place on 8 September 2012 at ExCeL Exhibition Centre.

== Schedule ==
All times are British Summer Time

Date	Time	Round
8 September 2012	11:30	Quarterfinals
8 September 2012	13:00	Semifinals
8 September 2012	19:30	Final

== Competition format ==
The tournament run in a knockout format. Teams progress through the draw until the finals, which decide the winners of the gold medals.

== Results ==
Quarterfinals
1	Hong Kong (HKG)	45
8	Great Britain (GBR)	26
5	China (CHN)	45
4	Russia (RUS)	38
3	Poland (POL)	45
6	Ukraine (UKR)	28
7	France (FRA)	41
2	Hungary (HUN)	45

Semifinals
1	Hong Kong (HKG)	42
5	China (CHN)	45
3	Poland (POL)	40
2	Hungary (HUN)	45

Finals
5	China (CHN)	45
2	Hungary (HUN)	38
Bronze Medal Match
1	Hong Kong (HKG)	45
3	Poland (POL)	26

Classification 5-8
8	Great Britain (GBR)	28
4	Russia (RUS)	45
6	Ukraine (UKR)	37
7	France (FRA)	36

5th Place Match
4	Russia (RUS)	45
6	Ukraine (UKR)	23
7th Place Match
8	Great Britain (GBR)	33
7	France (FRA)	45
