= Wong Ka Man (table tennis) =

Hong Kong para table tennis player

Personal information
- Born: November 21, 1985 (age 40) Hong Kong

Sport
- Sport: Table tennis
- Playing style: Right-handed penhold
- Disability class: 11
- Highest ranking: 3 (October 2012)
- Current ranking: 17 (February 2020)
Medal record
Women's para table tennis
Representing Hong Kong
Summer Paralympics
Gold medal – first place	2012 London	Singles C11
World Championships
Silver medal – second place	2017 Bratislava	Teams C11
Asian Para Games
Gold medal – first place	2014 Incheon	Singles C11
Gold medal – first place	2018 Jakarta	Teams C11
Bronze medal – third place	2018 Jakarta	Singles C11
Bronze medal – third place	2022 Hangzhou	Doubles C22
FESPIC Games
Silver medal – second place	2002 Busan	Singles C11
Asian Championships
Gold medal – first place	2015 Amman	Singles C11
Gold medal – first place	2017 Beijing	Teams C11
Silver medal – second place	2019 Taichung	Teams C11
Bronze medal – third place	2011 Hong Kong	Singles C11
Bronze medal – third place	2017 Beijing	Singles C11

Wong Ka Man
- Traditional Chinese: 黃家汶
- Simplified Chinese: 黄家汶
Transcriptions
Standard Mandarin
- Hanyu Pinyin: Huáng Jiāwèn
Yue: Cantonese
- Jyutping: Wong^{4} Gaa^{1} Man^{6}

Wong Ka Man (Chinese: 黃家汶, born 21 November 1985) is a Hong Kong para table tennis player. She won a gold medal at the 2012 Summer Paralympics.

== Personal life ==
Wong has congenital intellectual disability.
