= Siberian State Automobile and Highway University =

Coordinates: 55°01′23″N 73°18′02″E

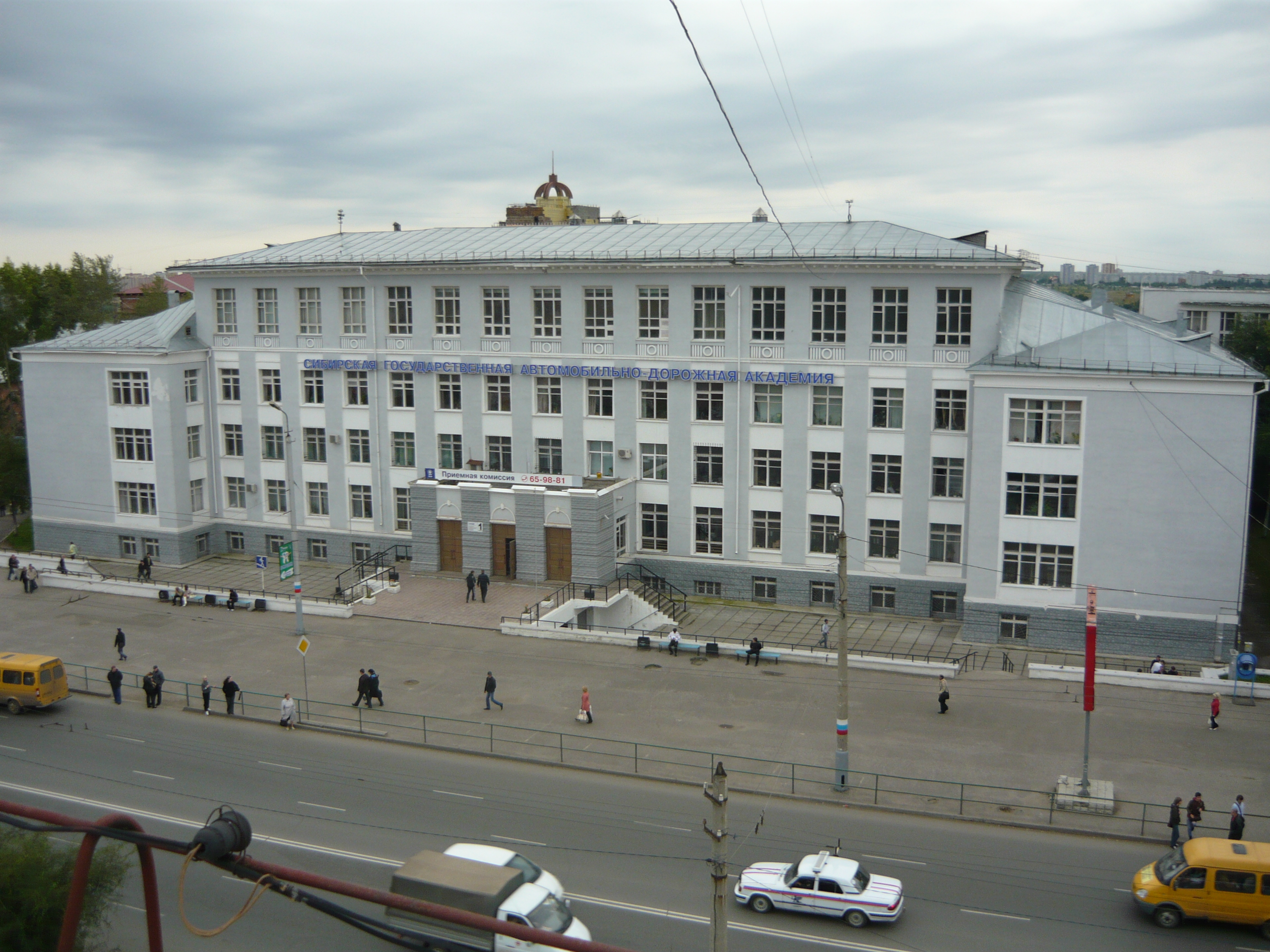
University building

Siberian State Automobile and Highway University, (SibADI; Russian: Сибирский государственный автомобильно-дорожный университет, СибАДИ), until 2017 Siberian State Automobile and Highway Academy, is a university in Omsk, Russia.
