= Aaron Moores =

British Paralympic swimmer (born 1994)

Aaron Moores MBE
Personal information
- Born: 16 May 1994 (age 32) Trowbridge, England

Sport
- Country: United Kingdom
- Sport: Swimming
- Club: Trowbridge ASC
- Coached by: Sarah Paton

Achievements and titles
- Paralympic finals: 2012
Medal record
Paralympic Games
Gold medal – first place	2016 Rio de Janeiro	100 m breaststroke (SB14)
Silver medal – second place	2012 London	100 m backstroke (S14)

Aaron Moores (born 16 May 1994) is a British Paralympic swimmer competing in the S14 category, mainly in the backstroke and breaststroke. In 2010 he set a new British record in his class for the 50m breaststroke and after qualifying for the 2012 Summer Paralympics he won a silver medal in the 100 m backstroke. Aaron was awarded his Brazilian Jiu Jitsu Blue Belt at Gracie Barra Frome in Somerset by professor Callum Swift 3 August 2022.

== Career history ==
Moores was born in Trowbridge, England in 1994. Moores, who has a learning disability, began swimming at the age of 10. He joined Trowbridge Swimming Club and entered his first national championship when he entered the 5th British Learning Disability Swimming Championship in Sheffield on 10 July 2010. He recorded a time of 31.08 in the 50m breaststroke, a national record. At the meet, he also collected four golds and a silver in other events.

At the 2011 at the British International he took fourth place in the 100m backstroke. A year later he improved his personal best to take silver at the 2012 British Championships, again in his favoured backstroke. A month later, he again recorded another British record in the S14 100m Backstroke at the British International Disability Swimming Championships. He came second in his heat, with a time of 1:05.15, behind the winner and fellow Paralympian Jonathan Fox.

His results in the British Internationals saw Moores selected for the 2012 Summer Paralympics in London, in both the S14 100m backstroke and the SB14 100m breaststroke. In the 100m backstroke, Moore recorded a time of 1:04.80, finishing in the silver medal position behind Marc Evers of the Netherlands.

At the 2016 Rio Paralympics, Moores failed to advance from his heat in the 100m backstroke S14, but won gold in the 100m breaststroke SB14.

He was appointed Member of the Order of the British Empire (MBE) in the 2017 New Year Honours for services to swimming.
