= Maryanovka, Amur Oblast =

Maryanovka Марьяновка
- Selo
- Location within Amur Oblast Location within Russia
- Coordinates: 50°18′N 129°27′E
- Country: Russia
- Region: Amur Oblast
- District: Oktyabrsky District
- Time zone: UTC+9:00

Maryanovka (Russian: Марьяновка) is a rural locality (a selo) in Romanovsky Selsoviet of Oktyabrsky District, Amur Oblast, Russia. The population was 164 as of 2018. There are 3 streets.

== Geography ==
Maryanovka is located 33 kilometres (21 miles) southeast of Yekaterinoslavka. Avramovka is the nearest rural locality.
