= Tam Chik Sum =

Hong Kong wheelchair fencer

Personal information
- Born: 15 December 1987 (age 38) Hong Kong

Sport
- Country: Hong Kong
- Sport: Wheelchair fencing
Medal record
Representing Hong Kong
Paralympic Games
Silver medal – second place	2012 London	Épée B
Asian Para Games
Gold medal – first place	2014 Incheon	Sabre B
Gold medal – first place	2014 Incheon	Team sabre
Silver medal – second place	2010 Guangzhou	Sabre B
Bronze medal – third place	2010 Guangzhou	Épée B

Tam Chik Sum (born 15 December 1987) is a Hong Kong wheelchair fencer. He won the silver medal in the men's épée B event at the 2012 Summer Paralympics held in London, United Kingdom. He also competed in the men's sabre B event. He also competed at the 2016 Summer Paralympics held in Rio de Janeiro, Brazil.

He competed at several editions of the IWAS Wheelchair Fencing World Championships, including 2010, 2011 and 2013, as well as various regional competitions. He won one of the bronze medals at this competition in 2013. He won the silver medal in the men's épée B event at the 2016 IWAS Asian Wheelchair Fencing Championships.
