= Peter McGuire =

Scottish Boccia player (born 1982)

Peter McGuire (born 24 October 1982) is a British Boccia player from Hamilton, Scotland and passionate advocate of Powerchair Football. He was born in Bellshill to a Scottish father and mother. He was born with muscular dystrophy, a degenerative condition that means he requires the use of a wheelchair.

== Boccia ==
McGuire was introduced to the sport of boccia by his younger brother Stephen, who also has muscular dystrophy. He competes in the BC4 classification.

In 2008, Peter became both Scottish and British champion and followed that up in 2009 by winning the gold medal in the BC4 pairs event at the European Championships held in Porto, Portugal. In 2010, competing with his brother Stephen, he won silver at the World Championships in Lisbon, Portugal.

In 2012 Peter and Stephen were selected in the boccia squad to represent Great Britain at the 2012 Summer Paralympics and it was then that they became known as The Boccia Brothers.

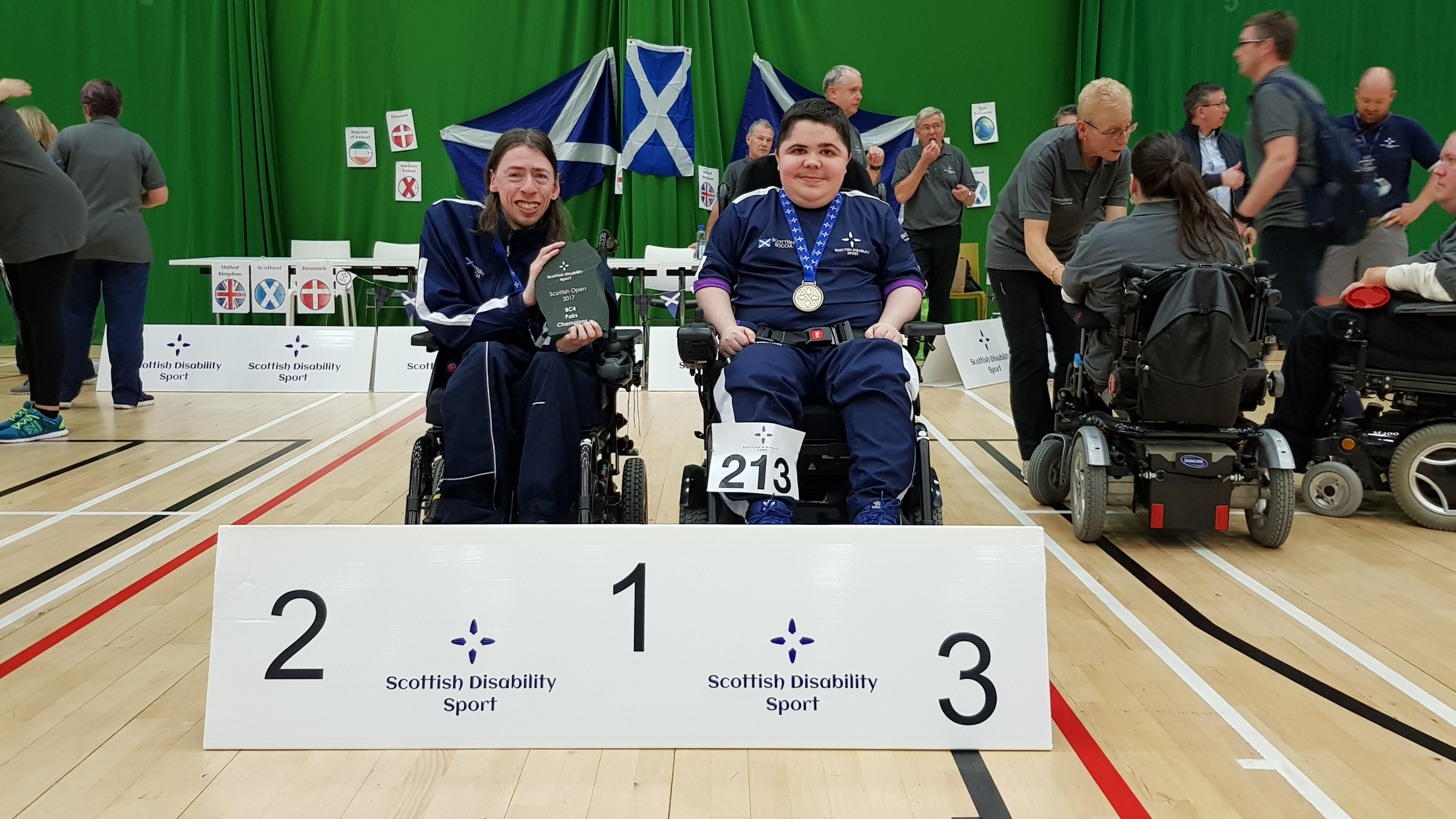
BC4 Pairs Champions, Peter McGuire and Ross Munro

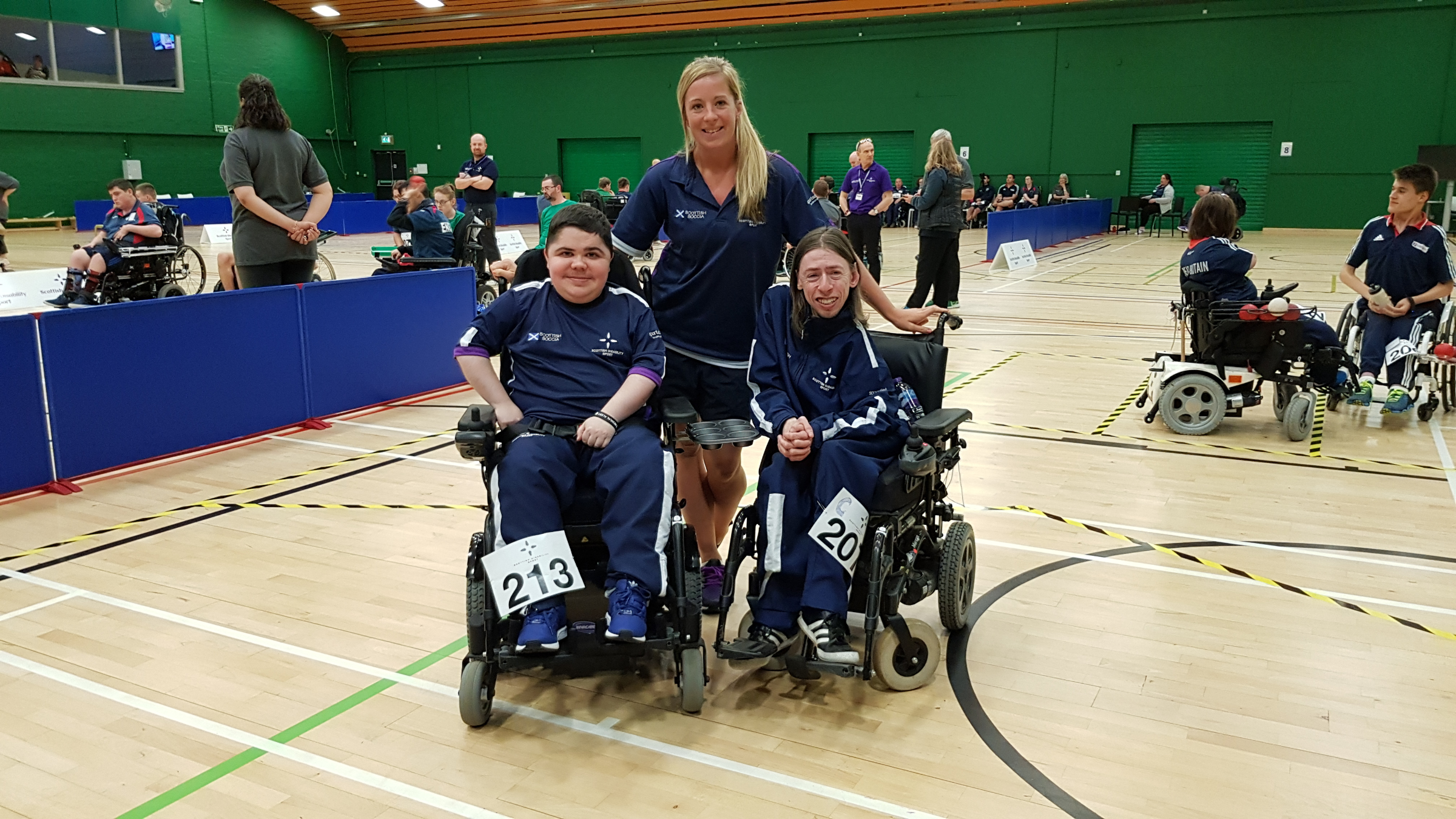
BC4 Pairs Champions, Peter McGuire and Ross Munro with their coach Jennifer Livingstone of Scottish Disability Sport.
