= Anton Datsko =

Ukrainian Paralympic fencer

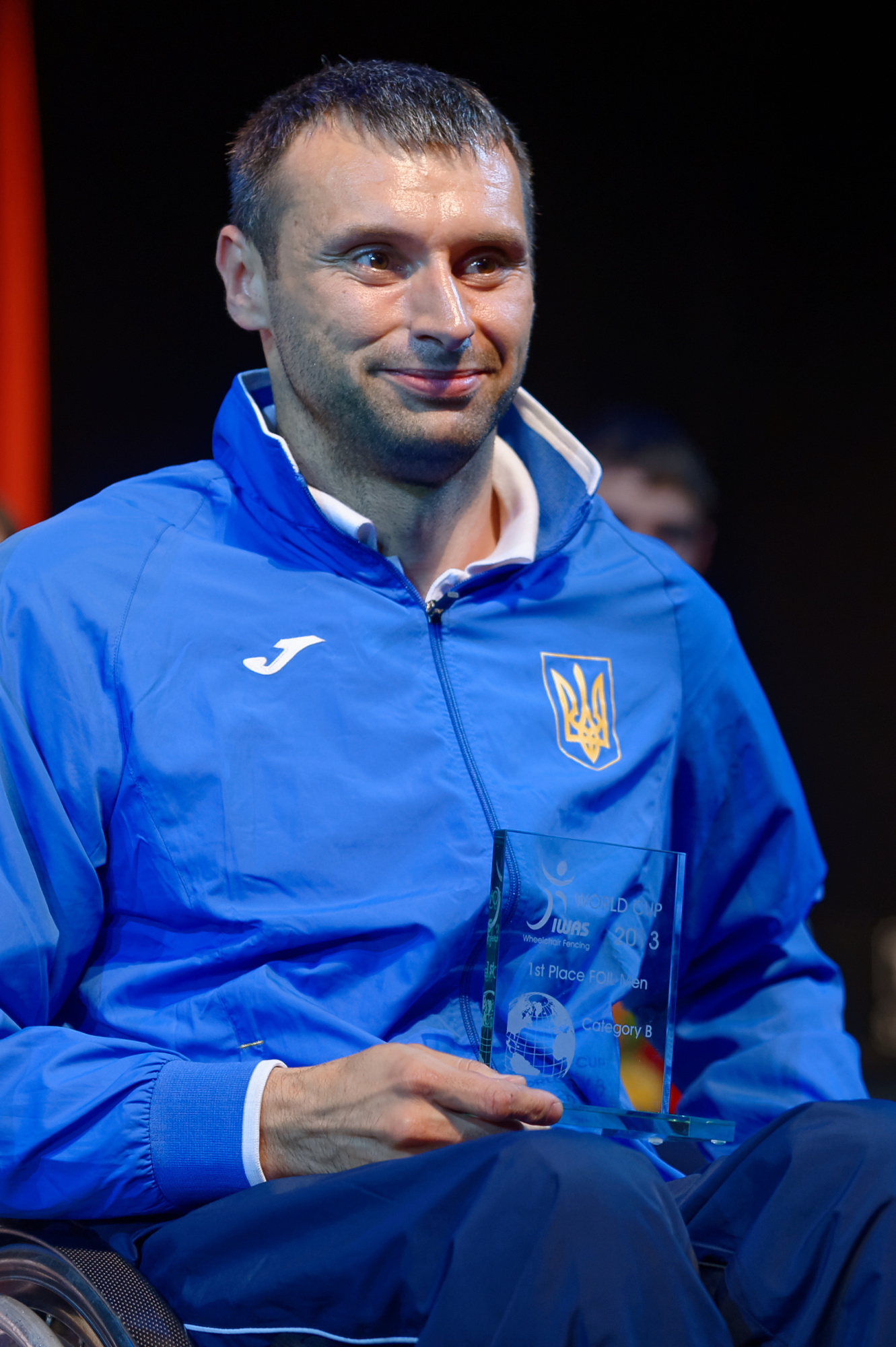

Personal information
- Born: May 24, 1983 (age 43) Busk, Ukraine

Fencing career
- Sport: Fencing
- Country: Ukraine
- Personal coach: Svitlana Kolesnykova
Medal record
Athletics
IWAS Wheelchair Fencing Grand Prix
Gold medal – first place	IWAS Wheelchair Fencing Grand Prix	Wheelchair fencing
Paralympic Games
Gold medal – first place	2016 Rio	Men's sabre B
Silver medal – second place	2012 London	Men's Foil B

Anton Datsko (Ukrainian: Антон Дацко; b. 24 May 1983) is a Ukrainian wheelchair fencer who won gold medal at IWAS Wheelchair Fencing Grand Prix in Eger, Hungary, won gold medal at the Paralympic Games in Rio de Janeiro in 2016 and won a silver medal at the Paralympic Games in London in 2012.

== Biography ==
Anton Datsko was born on 24 May 1983 in Busk, Lviv Oblast, Ukraine. An accident happened to him aged 16, when he, a senior school pupil, fell off a walnut tree. After high school Anton studied to be a tailor and at first worked at a garment factory. While doing a regular rehab in Lviv, he was advised to go in for sport, and took up fencing by advice of his first couch. He is since training in 'Invasport' program in Lviv.

Anton has been in wheelchair fencing since 2003 and has been a part of the national team since 2005. He competes in category "B" for men's sabre and foil.

== Sports career ==
At the Paralympics in Beijing Datsko placed seventh in foil and was tenth in sabre. He won some medals at the European and World championships in 2011.

Datsko won the silver medal at the Paralympic Games in London due to a loss during the finals to China's Hu Daoliang 10–15.

In 2015 he was European Champion in both the category B foil and sabre events.

In wheelchair fencing at 2016 Summer Paralympics, Anton Datsko won 'gold' in the men's individual saber event (category B) after winning 15–7 against Panagiotis Triantafyllou of Greece.

In 2017 Anton Datsko won 'bronze' at Wheelchair Fencing Stadskanaal World Cup and 'gold' at Wheelchair Fencing Pisa World Cup. On the 2017 Wheelchair Fencing World Championships held in Rome Anton Datsko took 'silver' (foil), and 'bronze' (saber team).
