= Ben Procter (swimmer) =

British Paralympic swimmer

Personal information
- Full name: Benjamin Procter
- Nationality: British
- Born: 11 March 1990 (age 36) Oldham, England

Sport
- Sport: Swimming
- Strokes: Backstroke; Freestyle; Butterfly; Medley
- Club: Manchester HPC / Truro
- Coach: Mick Massey
Medal record
Swimming
Representing Great Britain
Event	1st	2nd	3rd
Paralympic Games	0	0	0
World Championships	0	0	2
European Championships	0	4	1
World Championships
Bronze medal – third place	2010 Eindhoven	200m freestyle S14
Bronze medal – third place	2013 Montreal	200m medley SM14
European Championships
Silver medal – second place	2009 Reykjavik	100m freestyle S14
Silver medal – second place	2009 Reykjavik	100m backstroke - S14
Silver medal – second place	2009 Reykjavik	200m medley SM14
Silver medal – second place	2011 Berlin	100m backstroke - S14
Bronze medal – third place	2011 Berlin	200m freestyle - S14

Ben Procter (born 11 March 1990) is a British Paralympic swimmer competing in S14 classification events. Procter participated in the 2012 Summer Paralympics as part of the Great Britain team. In 2010 he qualified for the Swimming World Championships in Eindhoven and achieved his first world podium finish, taking bronze in the 200m freestyle.
