= Maryanovka, Omsk Oblast =

Maryanovka Марьяновка
- Urban-type settlement
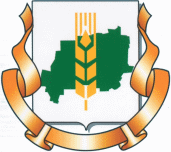
- Flag Coat of arms
- Interactive map of Maryanovka
- Location of Maryanovka Maryanovka (Omsk Oblast)
- Coordinates: 54.9604°N 72.6380°E
- Country: Russia
- Federal subject: Omsk Oblast
- Administrative district: Maryanovsky District
- Founded: 1894

Population (2010 Census)
  - Total: 8,630
  - Estimate (2025): 8,570 (−0.7%)
- Time zone: UTC+6 (MSK+3)
- Postal code: 646040
- OKTMO ID: 52630151051

Maryanovka (Russian: Марьяновка) is an urban locality (an urban-type settlement) in Maryanovsky District of Omsk Oblast, Russia. Population: 8,630 (2010 census); 8,403 (2002 census); 8,617 (1989 Soviet census).
