= Jovane Guissone =

Brazilian Paralympic fencer

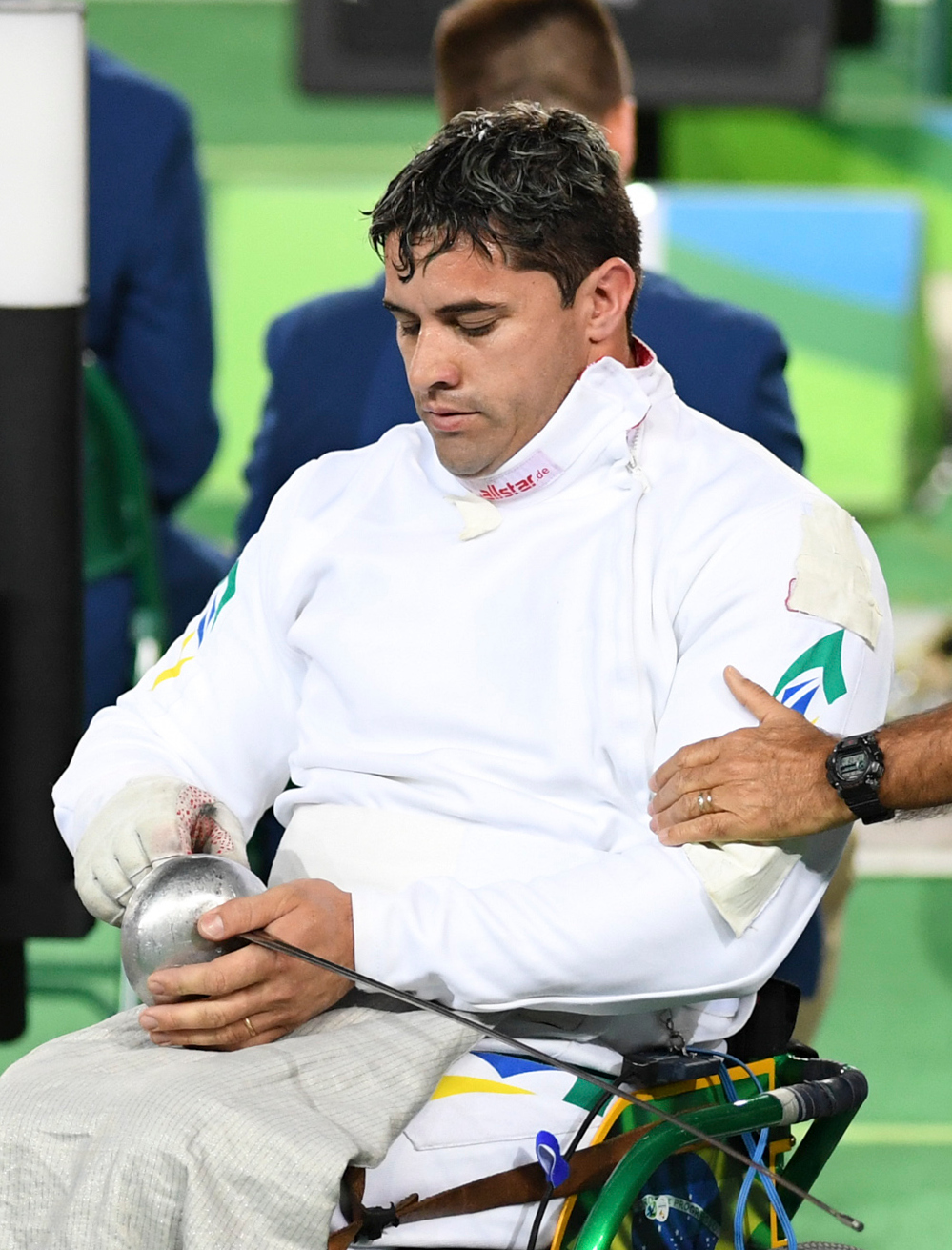
- Guissone at the 2016 Paralympics

Personal information
- Born: 11 March 1983 (age 43)
- Height: 193 cm (6 ft 4 in)
- Weight: 100 kg (220 lb)

Sport
- Sport: Fencing
- Events: Foil, épée
- Coached by: Linio Eduardo
Medal record
Representing Brazil
Paralympic Games
Gold medal – first place	2012 London	épée
Silver medal – second place	2020 Tokyo	Épée B

Jovane Silva Guissone (born 11 March 1983) is a Paralympic épée and foil fencer from Brazil. He competed at the 2012 and 2016 Paralympics and won a gold medal in the individual épée in 2012.

Guissone lost control of his legs after being shot in 2004. In 2008 he took up wheelchair fencing, and in 2014 was named Top Paralympic Performer of the Year at the 2014 Brazilian Paralympic Awards in Copacabana. Guissone is married and has a son.
