= Maryanovsky District =

Maryanovsky District Марьяновский район (Russian)
- District
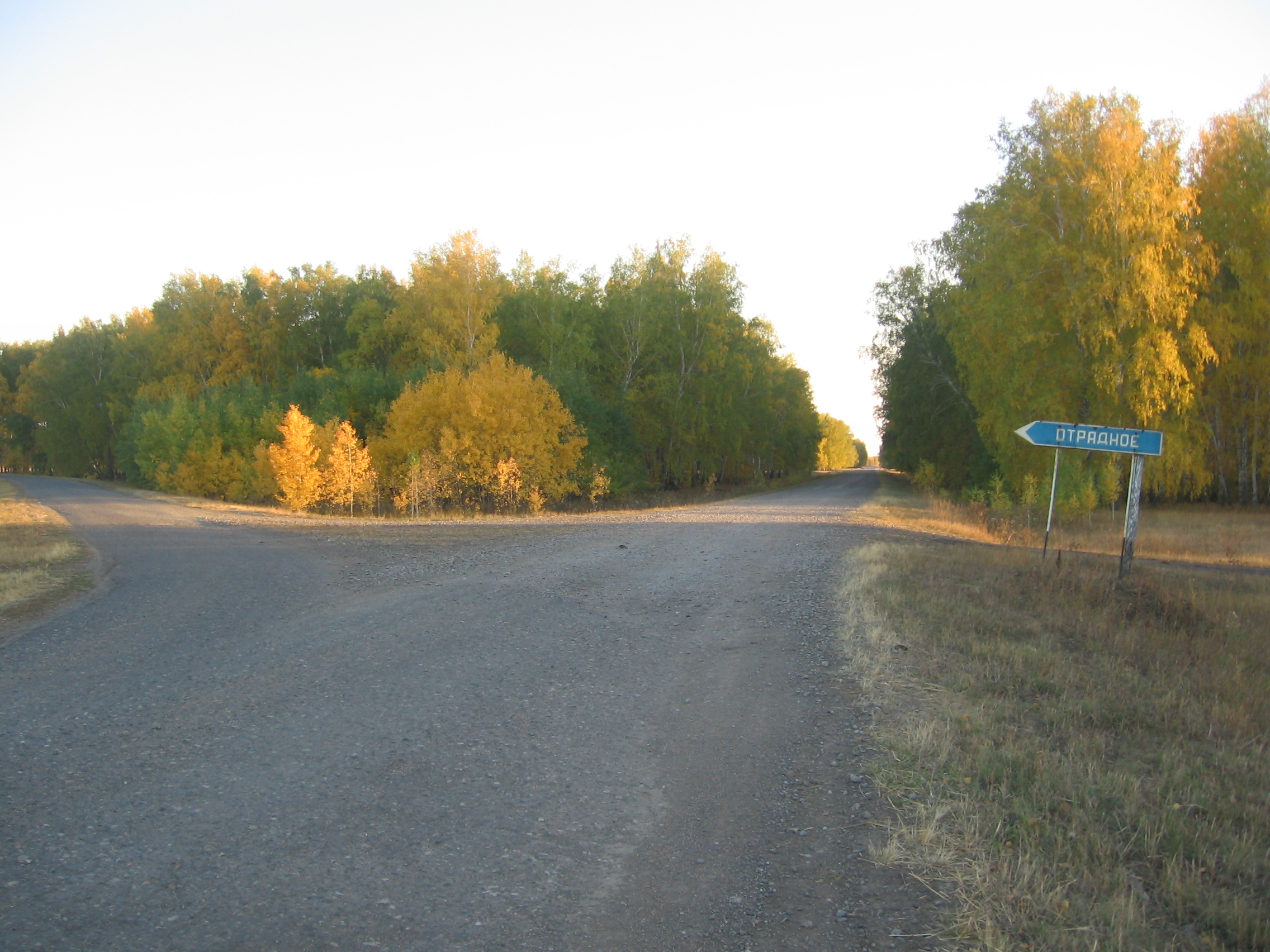
- Entrance to Otradnoe, Maryanovsky District

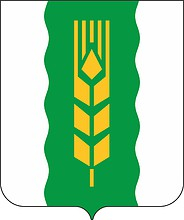
- Flag Coat of arms
- Location of Maryanovsky District in Omsk Oblast
- Coordinates: 54°58′N 72°38′E
- Country: Russia
- Federal subject: Omsk Oblast
- Established: 1935
- Administrative center: Maryanovka

Area
  - Total: 1,700 km^{2} (660 sq mi)

Population (2010 Census)
  - Total: 27,595
  - Density: 16/km^{2} (42/sq mi)
  - Urban: 31.3%
  - Rural: 68.7%

Administrative structure
  - Administrative divisions: 1 Work settlements, 9 Rural okrugs
  - Inhabited localities: 1 urban-type settlements, 41 rural localities

Municipal structure
  - Municipally incorporated as: Maryanovsky Municipal District
  - Municipal divisions: 1 urban settlements, 9 rural settlements
- Time zone: UTC+6 (MSK+3)
- OKTMO ID: 52630000
- Website: http://maryan.omskportal.ru/

Maryanovsky District (Russian: Марья́новский райо́н) is an administrative and municipal district (raion), one of the thirty-two in Omsk Oblast, Russia. It is located in the southwest of the oblast. The area of the district is 1,700 square kilometers (660 sq mi). Its administrative center is the urban locality (a work settlement) of Maryanovka. Population: 27,595 (2010 Census); 27,802 (2002 census); 30,173 (1989 Soviet census). The population of Maryanovka accounts for 31.3% of the district's total population.

== Geography ==
Maryanovsky district is located in the south of the West Siberian Plain. The Kamyshlov Log runs across the area.
