= Anzhelika Kosacheva =

Russian para table tennis player (born 1982)

Personal information
- Born: 28 September 1982 (age 43) Saratov, Soviet Union

Sport
- Sport: Para table tennis
- Disability class: C11
Medal record
Representing Russia
Paralympic Games
Bronze medal – third place	2012 London	Singles C11
World Championships
Gold medal – first place	2014 Beijing	Singles C11
Gold medal – first place	2017 Bratislava	Teams C11
European Championships
Gold medal – first place	2011 Split	Singles C11
Gold medal – first place	2019 Helsingborg	Teams C11
Silver medal – second place	2013 Lignano	Teams C11
Bronze medal – third place	2017 Lasko	Singles C11

Anzhelika Pavlovna Kosacheva (Russian: Анжелика Павловна Косачёва; born 28 September 1982) is a Russian former para table tennis player who competed in international table tennis competitions. She is a double World and European champion in teams events. She is also a Paralympic bronze medalist in the singles at the 2012 Summer Paralympics.
