= Yeung Chi Ka (table tennis) =

Hong Kong para table tennis player (born 1988)

Personal information
- Born: November 6, 1988 (age 37) Hong Kong

Sport
- Sport: Table tennis
- Playing style: Right-handed shakehand grip
- Disability class: 11
- Highest ranking: 1 (July 2012)
Medal record
Women's para table tennis
Representing Hong Kong
Summer Paralympics
| Silver medal – second place | 2012 London | Singles C11 |
Asian Championships
| Gold medal – first place | 2011 Hong Kong | Singles C11 |
| Gold medal – first place | 2013 Beijing | Singles C11 |

Yeung Chi Ka
- Traditional Chinese: 楊賜嘉
- Simplified Chinese: 杨赐嘉
Transcriptions
Standard Mandarin
- Hanyu Pinyin: Yáng Cìjiā
Yue: Cantonese
- Jyutping: Joeng^{4} Ci^{3} Gaa^{1}

Yeung Chi Ka (Chinese: 楊賜嘉, born 6 November 1988) is a Hong Kong retired para table tennis player. She won a silver medal at the 2012 Summer Paralympics.

Yeung has an intellectual disability.
