= Marc Evers =

Dutch Paralympic swimmer (born 1991)

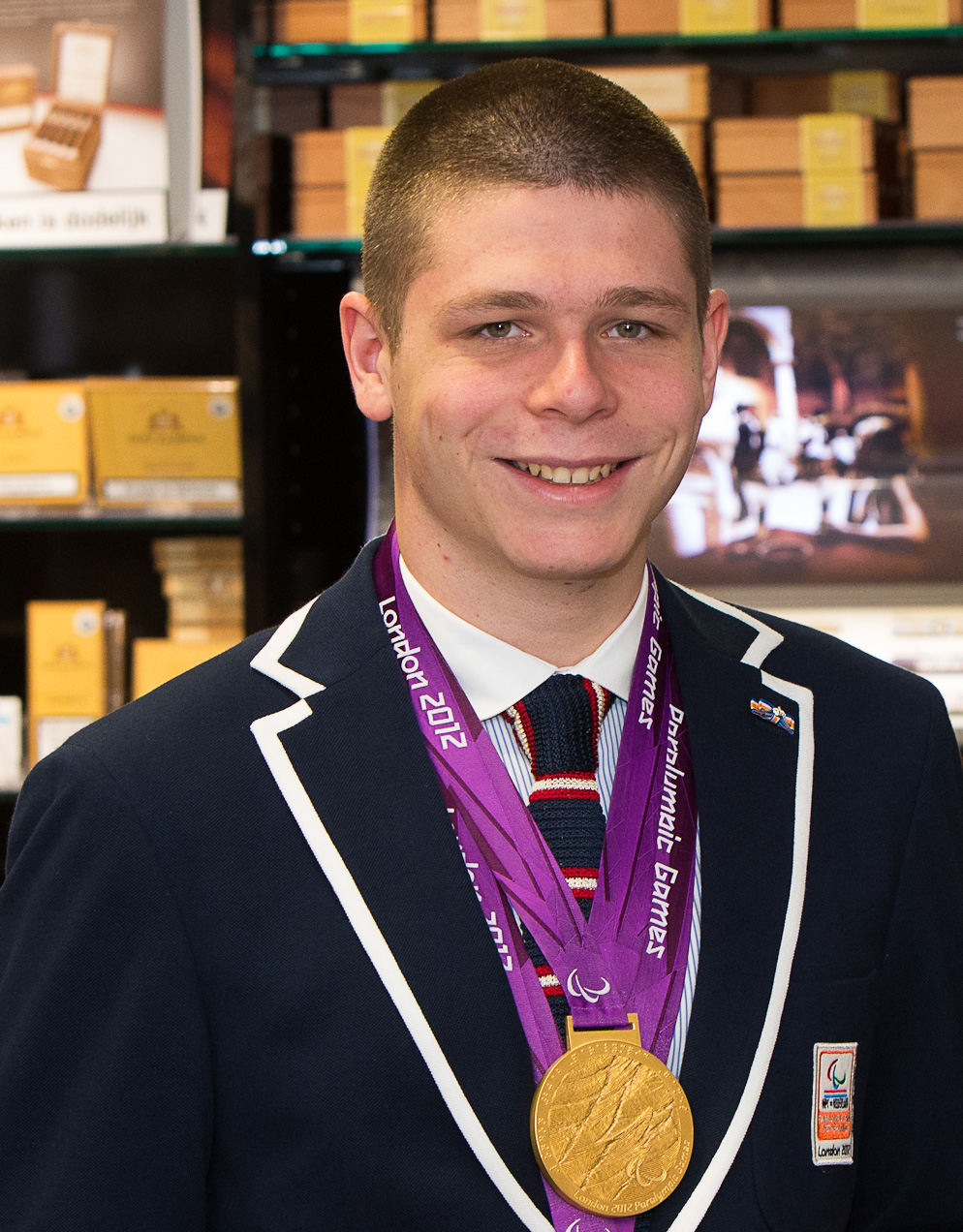

Personal information
- Nationality: Netherlands
- Born: June 17, 1991 (age 35) Hillegom

Sport
- Sport: Swimming
- Strokes: Backstroke and breaststroke
Medal record
Men's para swimming
Representing Netherlands
Paralympic Games
Gold medal – first place	2012 London	100m backstroke S14
Silver medal – second place	2016 Rio de Janeiro	100m backstroke S14
Bronze medal – third place	2012 London	100m breaststroke SB14
Bronze medal – third place	2016 Rio de Janeiro	100m breaststroke SB14
World Championships
Gold medal – first place	2015 Glasgow	100m breaststroke SB14
Gold medal – first place	2013 Montreal	200m medley SM14
Gold medal – first place	2013 Montreal	100m backstroke S14
Gold medal – first place	2013 Montreal	100m breaststroke SB14
Silver medal – second place	2015 Glasgow	200m medley SM14
Bronze medal – third place	2015 Glasgow	100m backstroke S14
Bronze medal – third place	2010 Eindhoven	100m backstroke
European Championships
Gold medal – first place	2014 Eindhoven	100m breaststroke SB14
Gold medal – first place	2014 Eindhoven	100m backstroke S14
Gold medal – first place	2014 Eindhoven	200m medley SM14
Gold medal – first place	2011 Berlin	100m breaststroke SB14
Gold medal – first place	2011 Berlin	100m backstroke S14
Gold medal – first place	2016 Funchal	100 m backstroke – S14
Gold medal – first place	2016 Funchal	200 m ind. medley SM14
Silver medal – second place	2011 Berlin	200m freestyle SM14
Bronze medal – third place	2009 Reykjavik	100m freestyle S14
Bronze medal – third place	2009 Reykjavik	200m medley SM14

Marc Evers (born 17 July 1991) is a Dutch Paralympic swimmer. He swims in S14 and SB14 classification events, specializing in both backstroke and breaststroke competitions. He is a Paralympic, World and European champion in the 100m breaststroke.

== Personal history ==
Evers was born in Hillegom, Netherlands in 1991.

== Swimming career ==
Evers learnt to swim at the age of four. At the age of twelve he began competitive swimming and won several national youth titles. Initially he found it difficult to find a swimming club that would coach him due to his intellectual disability. Eventually he joined ZV Haerlem, where he met trainer Wim Ten Wolde. In 2007 Evers was selected for the Netherlands national swimming team.

In December 2011, at the Open Dutch Championships in Eindhoven, he qualified for the 2012 Summer Paralympics in London. At London, on 31 August, he won the gold medal in the 100m backstroke setting a world record time. Six days later he took the bronze medal in the 100m breaststroke. When Evers took the gold in the backstroke he became the first athlete with an intellectual disability to win a medal since Sydney 2000.

== In media ==
Evers is the subject of the 2024 Dutch-language graphic novel The Great Marc Evers, which was written by Ivo van Woerden and illustrated by Gemma Plum.
