= Michael Heath (Paralympic swimmer) =

Canadian Paralympic swimmer

Michael Heath (born 1989) is a Canadian swimmer who participated in the 2012 Summer Paralympics in London. He competed in the 200m freestyle, the 100m breaststroke, and the 100m backstroke. Heath trains with the Wilmot Aquatic Aces in New Hamburg, Ontario.

In 2012, Heath participated in the Pan Pacific Para-Swimming Championships, and took home a bronze medal in the Men's 100m LC Meter Breaststroke Multi-Disability.

Heath is now retired from the Paralympics. In August 2013, he married Kassandra Heath (Lee) in London, Ontario. They now reside in London, Ontario.
