= Marc-André Cratère =

French wheelchair fencer (born 1973)

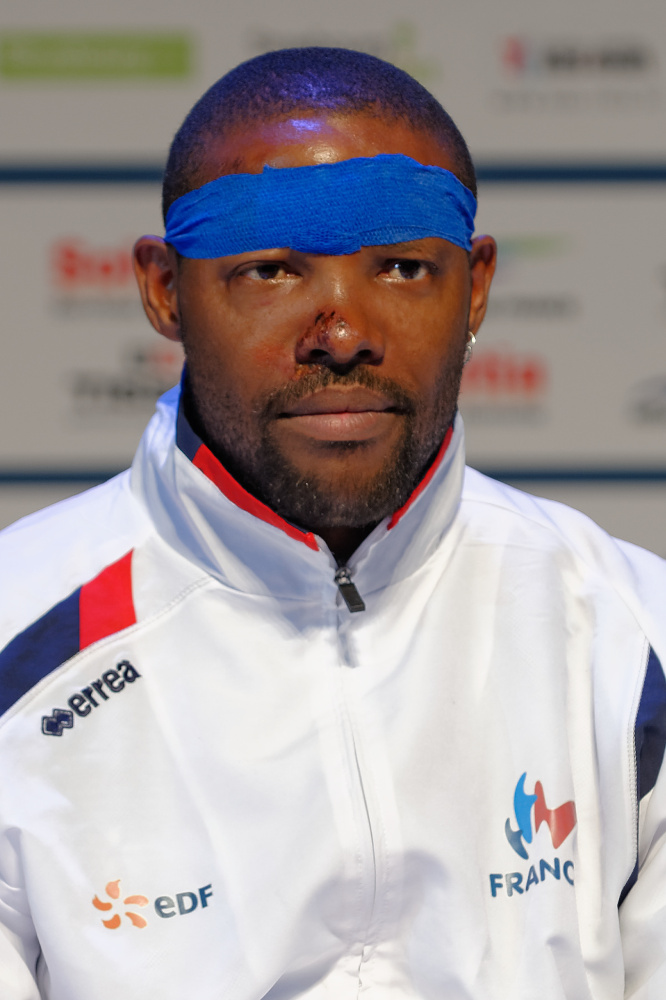
- Cratère in 2014

Personal information
- Born: 3 February 1973 (age 53) Le Robert, Martinique, France

Sport
- Country: France
- Sport: Wheelchair fencing
Medal record
Wheelchair fencing
Representing France
Paralympic Games
| Silver medal – second place | 2012 London | Individual sabre B |
World IWAS Championships
| Gold medal – first place | 2010 Paris | Team épée |
| Gold medal – first place | 2010 Paris | Team sabre |
| Gold medal – first place | 2011 Sheffield | Team sabre |
| Silver medal – second place | 2006 Turin | Individual sabre B |
| Silver medal – second place | 2011 Sheffield | Team épée |
| Silver medal – second place | 2013 Budapest | Individual sabre B |
| Bronze medal – third place | 2010 Paris | Individual épée B |
| Bronze medal – third place | 2010 Paris | Individual sabre B |
| Bronze medal – third place | 2013 Budapest | Team sabre |
European IWAS Championships
| Gold medal – first place | 2009 Warsaw | Team sabre |
| Gold medal – first place | 2009 Warsaw | Team épée |
| Gold medal – first place | 2009 Warsaw | Individual épée B |
| Gold medal – first place | 2014 Strasbourg | Team épée |
| Silver medal – second place | 2014 Strasbourg | Team sabre |
| Silver medal – second place | 2016 Casale Monferrato | Individual épée B |
| Silver medal – second place | 2018 Terni | Team épée |
| Bronze medal – third place | 2009 Warsaw | Individual sabre B |
| Bronze medal – third place | 2011 Sheffield | Individual épée B |
| Bronze medal – third place | 2011 Sheffield | Individual sabre B |

Marc-André Cratère (born 3 February 1973) is a French wheelchair fencer who competes at international fencing competitions. He is a Paralympic silver medalist. He is also a triple World champion and European champion in the épée and sabre.
