= Grzegorz Pluta =

Polish wheelchair fencer (born 1974)

Personal information
- Born: 28 November 1974 (age 51)

Sport
- Country: Poland
- Sport: Wheelchair fencing
Medal record
Paralympic Games
Gold medal – first place	2012 London	Sabre B

Grzegorz Pluta (born 28 November 1974) is a Polish wheelchair fencer. He represented Poland at the 2008 Summer Paralympics, the 2012 Summer Paralympics, the 2016 Summer Paralympics and the 2020 Summer Paralympics. He won the gold medal in the men's sabre B event in 2012.
