= Mitchell Kilduff =

Australian Paralympic swimmer

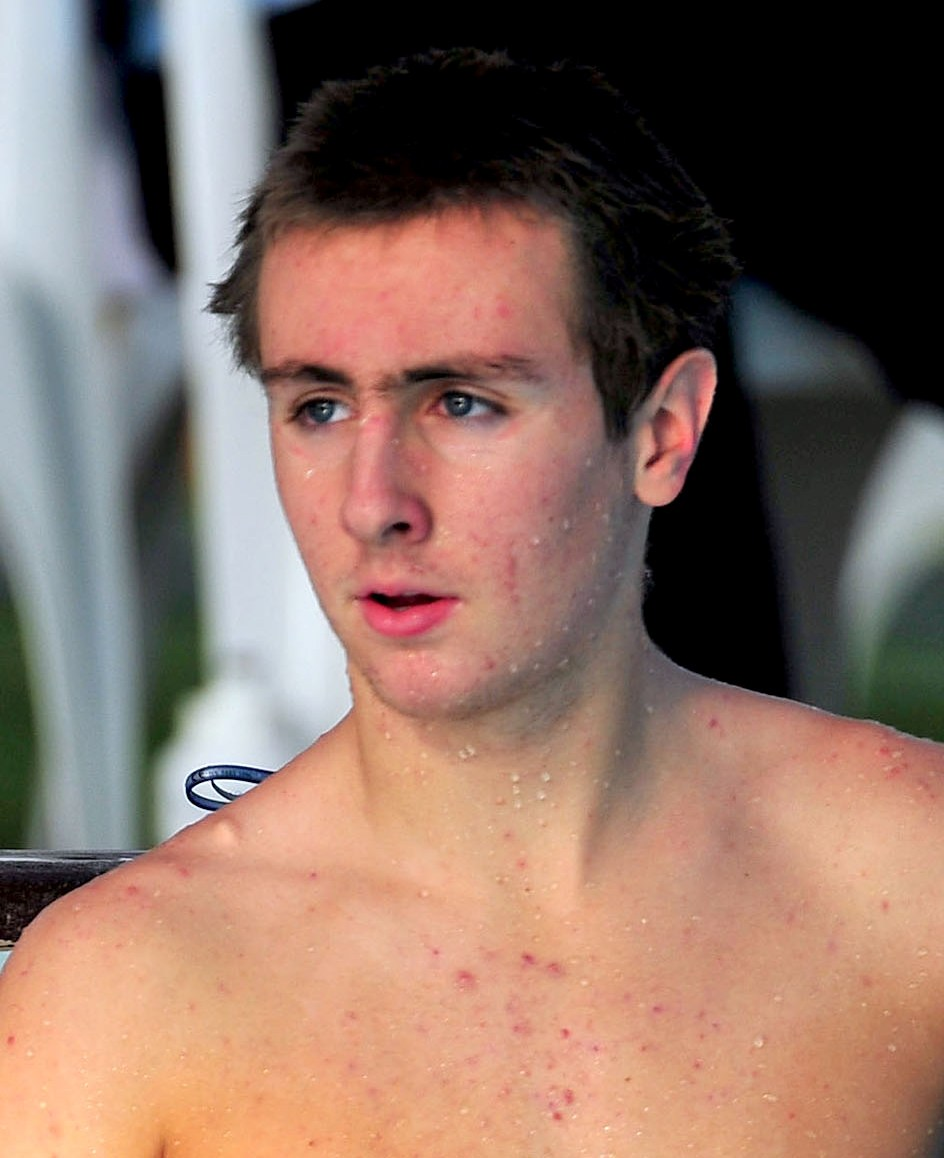
- Kilduff at the 2011 Oceania Paralympic Championships

Personal information
- Full name: Mitchell Kilduff
- Nickname: Micky
- Nationality: Australia
- Born: 29 February 1996 (age 30)
- Height: 167 cm (5 ft 6 in)
- Weight: 70 kg (154 lb)

Sport
- Sport: Swimming
- Strokes: Freestyle, butterfly, medley
- Classifications: S14, SB14, SM14
- Club: SLC Aquadot
- Coach: Gavin Stewart

Mitchell Kilduff (born 29 February 1996) is an Australian Paralympic swimmer. He was selected to represent Australia at the 2012 Summer Paralympics in swimming. He achieved 5th place in the 200 metre freestyle event at the 2012 Games.

== Early life ==
Kilduff was born on 29 February 1996, and is from Carlton, New South Wales. He was diagnosed with autism when he was six years old. During his early school years, he faced considerable challenges. Following that, he was home schooled. In 2009, he attended Endeavour Sports High School. As of 2012, he is a student at Kingsgrove North High School while mentoring other swimmers with autism.

== Swimming career ==
Kilduff is an S14 classified swimmer, who has set world records in several events including the long course 50m butterfly, 50m freestyle, the 100m butterfly, the 400m freestyle, and the source course 50m butterfly events in his classification. He is a member of SLC Aquadot and his coach is Gavin Stewart, who began coaching him in 2009. He has competed against able-bodied athletes.

Kilduff started swimming in 2006, and began taking lessons in 2007. In 2009, he was training seven days a week.

At the 2010 Australian national championships, Kilduff earned two gold medals. The following year at the same competition, he earned a total of seven medals, three of them gold. In 2011, he had nine swimming training sessions a week, with each session lasting about two hours. At the 2011 Australian Age Multi-Class Championships hosted at the Australian Institute of Sport pool, he won seven gold medals.

Kilduff first represented Australia in 2011, making his debut at the Arafura Games. At the Italian-hosted 2011 Global Games, he won a pair of silver medals and four gold medals. His silver medals came in the 4 × 100 m freestyle relay event and the 200m freestyle event where he had a time of 2:03.12. He earned a gold in the 50m freestyle event in a time of 25.78. He was selected to represent Australian Paralympics in swimming. He did not medal at the 2012 Games.

=== Personal bests ===
Course	Event	Time	Meet	Swim Date	Reference
Long	50m Backstroke	31.11	2012 EnergyAustralia Swimming Championships	20-Mar-12	
Long	100m Backstroke	01:10.5	2011 NSW State Open Championsh	11-Feb-11	
Long	50m Breaststroke	33.16	2011 NSW Metropolitan Champion	11-Dec-10	
Long	100m Breaststroke	01:14.8	2011 Telstra Australian Swimmi	1-Apr-11	
Long	200m Breaststroke	03:03.6	2009 NSW State 10/U-12 Years A	10-Jan-09	
Long	50m Butterfly	27.09	2015 Hancock Prospecting Australian Swimming Championships	5-Apr-15	
Long	100m Butterfly	01:00.7	2012 NSW State Age 13–18 Years Championships	15-Jan-12	
Long	200m Butterfly	02:21.2	2012 NSW State Age 13–18 Years Championships	11-Jan-12	
Long	50m Freestyle	24.84	2012 EnergyAustralia Swimming Championships	16-Mar-12	
Long	100m Freestyle	55.71	2012 EnergyAustralia Swimming Championships	19-Mar-12	
Long	200m Freestyle	02:04.1	2012 EnergyAustralia Swimming Championships	18-Mar-12	
Long	400m Freestyle	04:26.7	2012 NSW State Open Championships All Events	11-Feb-12	
Long	800m Freestyle	09:37.0	2010 NSW State 13–18 Years Age	4-Jan-10	
Long	200m Medley	02:24.0	2011 Telstra Australian Swimmi	1-Apr-11	
Short	50m Backstroke	30.76	2012 NSW Metropolitan SC Championships	15-Jul-12	
Short	100m Backstroke	01:08.5	2012 NSW SC Qualifying Meet	19-May-12	
Short	50m Breaststroke	32.67	2011 Australian Short Course Championships	2-Jul-11	
Short	100m Breaststroke	01:12.5	2012 NSW SC Qualifying Meet	20-May-12	
Short	50m Butterfly	27.45	2011 Australian Short Course Championships	3-Jul-11	
Short	100m Butterfly	01:00.4	2011 Australian Short Course Championships	2-Jul-11	
Short	200m Butterfly	02:16.3	2011 NSW State Age SC Championships	14-Aug-11	
Short	50m Freestyle	24.89	2010 NSW State Age SC Champion	13-Aug-10	
Short	100m Freestyle	55	2011 NSW State Age SC Championships	12-Aug-11	
Short	200m Freestyle	02:02.4	2011 NSW Metropolitan SC Championships	16-Jul-11	
Short	100m Medley	01:22.0	2007 NSW SC Development Meet	30-Sep-07	
Short	200m Medley	02:24.9	2011 Australian Short Course Championships	1-Jul-11	
