= 2011 IPC Swimming European Championships =

International swimming competition

- Venue: SSE Europasportpark
- Location: Berlin, Germany
- Start date: 3 July
- End date: 10 July
- Competitors: 440 from 36 nations

The 2011 IPC Swimming European Championships was an international swimming competition. It was held in Berlin, Germany from 3 to 10 July. There were 440 swimmers from 36 European countries that took part, Ukraine topped the medal table with 105 medals including 41 gold medals, the country also broke eighteen swimming records.

== Schedule ==
Date →		Sun 3 July	Mon 4 July	Tues 5 July	Wed 6 July	Thurs 7 July	Fri 8 July	Sat 9 July	Sun 10 July
50m freestyle	Men; Details	S1; S2; S3	S5; S8; S11	S4; S6; S7	S9; S12; S13	S10	S5		
50m freestyle	Women; Details	S2; S3	S5; S8; S11	S4; S6; S7	S9; S12; S13	S10	S5		
100m freestyle	Men; Details	S9; S10			S4	S1; S2; S3	S8; S11	S6; S7; S12; S13	
100m freestyle	Women; Details	S9; S10				S2; S3	S8; S11	S6; S7; S12; S13	
200m freestyle	Men; Details		S14	S1; S2				S3; S4; S5	
200m freestyle	Women; Details		S14	S2				S3; S5	
400m freestyle	Men; Details	S6; S7		S8; S11	S10	S12; S13	S9		
400m freestyle	Women; Details	S6; S7		S8; S11	S10	S12; S13	S9		
50m backstroke	Men; Details	S4		S3; S5		S12		S1; S2	
50m backstroke	Women; Details	S4		S3; S5		S12		S2	
100m backstroke	Men; Details	S8; S11			S14	S7		S6; S9; S10; S12; S13	
100m backstroke	Women; Details	S8; S11			S14	S7		S6; S9; S10; S12; S13	
50m breaststroke	Men; Details		SB3						
50m breaststroke	Women; Details		SB2; SB3						
100m breaststroke	Men; Details		SB6; SB7; SB12; SB13	SB9	SB8; SB11	SB5		SB14	
100m breaststroke	Women; Details		SB6; SB7; SB12; SB13	SB9	SB8; SB11	SB5		SB14	
50m butterfly	Men; Details	S5		S4				S6; S7	
50m butterfly	Women; Details	S5						S6; S7	
100m butterfly	Men; Details		S12; S13			S8; S11		S9; S10	
100m butterfly	Women; Details		S12			S8; S11		S9; S10	
150m individual medley	Men; Details							SM3; SM4	
150m individual medley	Women; Details							SM3; SM4	
200m individual medley	Men; Details	SM12; SM13	SM9; SM10		SM5; SM6; SM7			SM8; SM11	
200m individual medley	Women; Details	SM12; SM13	SM9; SM10		SM5; SM6; SM7			SM8; SM11	
Freestyle relay	Men; Details		20pts	34pts					
Freestyle relay	Women; Details		20pts	34pts					
Medley relay	Men; Details						20pts	34pts	
Medley relay	Women; Details						20pts	34pts	
Open water swimming	Men; Details								S10; S13
Open water swimming	Women; Details								S10

== Medal table ==
Rank	Nation	Gold	Silver	Bronze	Total
1	Ukraine (UKR)	41	37	27	105
2	Great Britain (GBR)	27	26	30	83
3	Spain (ESP)	26	13	18	57
4	Russia (RUS)	22	21	21	64
5	Netherlands (NED)	11	6	7	24
6	Germany (GER)	9	14	11	34
7	France (FRA)	6	7	10	23
8	Belarus (BLR)	5	5	3	13
9	Sweden (SWE)	4	6	3	13
10	Norway (NOR)	4	2	1	7
11	Hungary (HUN)	3	4	8	15
12	Israel (ISR)	3	1	2	6
13	Czech Republic (CZE)	3	1	1	5
14	Croatia (CRO)	2	5	1	8
15	Italy (ITA)	2	4	3	9
16	Greece (GRE)	1	8	2	11
17	Poland (POL)	1	5	8	14
18	Turkey (TUR)	1	1	1	3
19	Belgium (BEL)	1	0	3	4
20	Cyprus (CYP)	1	0	0	1
20	Estonia (EST)	1	0	0	1
22	Portugal (POR)	0	2	3	5
23	Denmark (DEN)	0	1	2	3
24	Ireland (IRL)	0	1	1	2
25	Slovakia (SVK)	0	1	0	1
25	Slovenia (SLO)	0	1	0	1
27	Austria (AUT)	0	0	1	1
27	Faroe Islands (FRO)	0	0	1	1
27	Switzerland (SUI)	0	0	1	1
Totals (29 entries)		174	172	169	515
