= Tang Wai-lok =

Hong Kong swimmer

Personal information
- Nationality: Hong Kong
- Born: 2 June 1997 (age 29)

Sport
- Sport: Swimming
- Strokes: freestyle
Medal record
Men's swimming
Representing Hong Kong
Paralympic Games
Gold medal – first place	2016 Rio de Janeiro	200m freestyle S14
Asian Para Games
Gold medal – first place	2014 Incheon	200m freestyle S14
Gold medal – first place	2018 Jakarta	200m freestyle S14
Gold medal – first place	2022 Hangzhou	200m freestyle S14
INAS Global Games
Gold medal – first place	2015 Ecuador	200m freestyle
Gold medal – first place	2015 Ecuador	4x50m medley relay
Gold medal – first place	2015 Ecuador	4x100m medley relay
Gold medal – first place	2015 Ecuador	4x200m freestyle relay
Gold medal – first place	2019 Brisbane	4x50m medley relay
Silver medal – second place	2015 Ecuador	100m freestyle
Silver medal – second place	2015 Ecuador	100m backstroke
Silver medal – second place	2015 Ecuador	4x100m freestyle relay
Silver medal – second place	2019 Brisbane	4x50m freestyle relay
Silver medal – second place	2019 Brisbane	4x100m freestyle relay
Silver medal – second place	2019 Brisbane	4x200m freestyle relay
Silver medal – second place	2019 Brisbane	200m freestyle
Bronze medal – third place	2015 Ecuador	50m backstroke
Bronze medal – third place	2019 Brisbane	200m individual medley
Bronze medal – third place	2019 Brisbane	100m freestyle

Tang Wai-lok (Chinese: 鄧韋樂) is a Hong Kong Paralympic swimmer, he classifies as a class S14 Paraswimmer.

== Personal life ==
At the age of 6, Tang was diagnosed with mild intellectual disability and had to transfer to a special-needs school, at the age of 11 he began swimming and his efforts paid off in a call up to the youth team, and eventually the Hong Kong Paralympic Swimming Team for the 2012 Paralympics. One of Tang's biggest influences is his mother, who he says had a "vital role" in his success.

=== Awards and Accolades ===
Accolades he has include being recipient of the 2014 Hong Kong Outstanding Youth Athlete, a 2015 International Sports Federation for Persons with Intellectual Disability Award for Best Male Athlete, as well as a 2016 Hong Kong Sports Star Award.

== Performance Across Competitions ==
=== 2012 Paralympic Games ===
Tang participated in the 2012 Paralympic Games, finishing 7th in the Men's 100m Backstroke, 6th in the Men's 200m Freestyle and failing to make it out of his heat in the Men's 100m Breaststroke.

=== 2016 Paralympic Games ===
Tang won Hong Kong's first Paralympic Swimming Gold in the 2016 Paralympic Games, coming 1st in the men's 200 meter freestyle whilst setting a new Paralympic record at that time of 1:56.32, Tang also finished 4th in the Men's 100m backstroke.

=== 2020 Paralympic Games ===
In the 2020 Paralympic Games, Tang failed to defend his Olympic title for the Men's 200 meter freestyle, coming in 10th in his heat and failing to qualify to the knockout stages. Tang also finished 6th in the Men's 100 meter butterfly.

=== Other International Events ===
In the 2015 INAS Global Games, Tang won Gold in the Men's 200m freestyle, Men's 200m and 400m Medley Relay and Men's 800m freestyle relay. Silver in the Men's 100m Freestyle, 100m Backstroke, 400m Men's freestyle Relay and Bronze in the Men's 50m backstroke.

Tang achieved Gold in the 2018 Asian Para Games for the Men's 200 meter freestyle, as well as Silver for the Men's 200 meter individual medley.

In the 2019 INAS Global Games, Tang achieved Gold in the Men's 4x50m medley relay, Silver in the Men's 4x50m, 4 × 100 m, 4 × 200 m Freestyle relay, Silver in the Men's 4 × 100 m Medley Relay and Bronze in the Men's 100m freestyle and Men's 200m individual Medley.
