= Jón Margeir Sverrisson =

Icelandic Paralympic swimmer

Personal information
- Nationality: Icelandic
- Born: 22 November 1992 (age 33) Reykjavík, Iceland
- Height: 179 cm (5 ft 10 in)

Sport
- Sport: Swimming
- Strokes: Freestyle, Breaststroke
- Club: Fjölnir: Reykjavík
- Coach: Ragnar Friðbjarnarson
Medal record
Swimming
Representing Iceland
Paralympic Games
Gold medal – first place	2012 London	200m freestyle S14
World Championships
Silver medal – second place	2013 Montreal	200m freestyle S14
Silver medal – second place	2015 Glasgow	200m freestyle S14
European Championships
Gold medal – first place	2014 Eindhoven	200m freestyle S14
Silver medal – second place	2016 Funchal	200m freestyle S14

Jón Margeir Sverrisson (born 22 November 1992) is a Paralympic swimmer from Iceland, competing in the S14 disability category in freestyle and breaststroke. He represented Iceland at the 2012 Summer Paralympics in London, winning the gold medal in the Men's 200m freestyle (S14).
