= China at the 2012 Summer Paralympics =

- IPC code: CHN
- NPC: China Administration of Sports for Persons with Disabilities
- Website: www.caspd.org.cn

in London
- Competitors: 282 in 15 sports
- Flag bearer: Zhang Lixin
- Medals Ranked 1st: Gold 95 Silver 71 Bronze 65 Total 231

Summer Paralympics appearances (overview)
- 1984; 1988; 1992; 1996; 2000; 2004; 2008; 2012; 2016; 2020; 2024

China competed at the 2012 Summer Paralympics in London, United Kingdom, from 29 August to 9 September 2012.

== Medalists ==
=== Gold medalists ===
Medal	Name	Sport	Event
Gold	Yan Huilian	Archery	Women's individual recurve
Gold	Xue Lei; Guide: Wang Lin	Athletics	Men's 100 metres T11
Gold	Zhao Xu	Athletics	Men's 100 metres T46
Gold	Li Huzhao	Athletics	Men's 200 metres T53
Gold	Li Huzhao	Athletics	Men's 400 metres T53
Gold	Zhang Lixin	Athletics	Men's 400 metres T54
Gold	Li Huzhao; Liu Chengming; Liu Yang; Zhang Lixin	Athletics	Men's 4 × 400 m relay T53/54
Gold	Wang Yanzhang	Athletics	Men's discus throw F32/33/34
Gold	Wang Zhiming	Athletics	Men's discus throw F40
Gold	Zhu Pengkai	Athletics	Men's javelin throw F12/13
Gold	Wang Zhiming	Athletics	Men's javelin throw F40
Gold	Gao Mingjie	Athletics	Men's javelin throw F44
Gold	Liu Fuliang	Athletics	Men's long jump F46
Gold	Liu Fuliang	Athletics	Men's triple jump F46
Gold	Xia Dong	Athletics	Men's shot put F37/38
Gold	Wang Zhiming	Athletics	Men's shot put F40
Gold	Zhou Guohua	Athletics	Women's 100 metres T12
Gold	Liu Ping	Athletics	Women's 100 metres T35
Gold	Huang Lisha	Athletics	Women's 100 metres T53
Gold	Liu Wenjun	Athletics	Women's 100 metres T54
Gold	Liu Ping	Athletics	Women's 200 metres T35
Gold	Chen Junfei	Athletics	Women's 200 metres T38
Gold	Huang Lisha	Athletics	Women's 200 metres T53
Gold	Zhou Hongzhuan	Athletics	Women's 400 metres T53
Gold	Zhou Hongzhuan	Athletics	Women's 800 metres T53
Gold	Zhang Liangmin	Athletics	Women's discus throw F11/12
Gold	Mi Na	Athletics	Women's discus throw F37
Gold	Wu Qing	Athletics	Women's discus throw F35/36
Gold	Yang Liwan	Athletics	Women's javelin throw F54/55/56
Gold	Liu Ming	Athletics	Women's javelin throw F57/58
Gold	Mi Na	Athletics	Women's shot put F37
Gold	Yao Juan	Athletics	Women's shot put F42/44
Gold	Yang Liwan	Athletics	Women's shot put F54/55/56
Gold	Zeng Sini	Cycling	Women's road race C1-3
Gold	Liang Guihua	Cycling	Men's individual pursuit C2
Gold	Li Zhangyu	Cycling	Men's 1km time trial C1–3
Gold	He Yin	Cycling	Women's 500 m time trial C1–3
Gold	Zeng Sini	Cycling	Women's individual pursuit C1–3
Gold	Ji Xiaofei; Liu Xinyang; Xie Hao	Cycling	Mixed team sprint
Gold	Yuan Yanping	Judo	Women's +70 kg
Gold	Fu Taoying	Powerlifting	Women's 75 kg
Gold	Qi Feng	Powerlifting	Men's 52 kg
Gold	Lei Liu	Powerlifting	Men's 67.5 kg
Gold	Huang Cheng	Rowing	Men's single sculls
Gold	Lou Xiaoxian; Fei Tianming	Rowing	Mixed double sculls
Gold	Dong Chao	Shooting	Men's 10 metre air rifle standing SH1
Gold	Zhang Cuiping	Shooting	Women's 10 metre air rifle standing SH1
Gold	Zhang Cuiping	Shooting	Women's 50 metre rifle 3 positions SH1
Gold	Li Jianfei	Shooting	Mixed 25 metre pistol SH1
Gold	Yang Yang	Swimming	Men's 50 metre freestyle S2
Gold	Xu Qing	Swimming	Men's 50 metre freestyle S6
Gold	Yang Bozun	Swimming	Men's 50 metre freestyle S11
Gold	Yang Yang	Swimming	Men's 100 metre freestyle S2
Gold	Xu Qing	Swimming	Men's 100 metre freestyle S6
Gold	Pan Shiyun	Swimming	Men's 100 metre freestyle S7
Gold	Wang Yinan	Swimming	Men's 100 metre freestyle S8
Gold	Yang Yang	Swimming	Men's 200 metre freestyle S2
Gold	Wang Yinan	Swimming	Men's 400 metre freestyle S8
Gold	Yang Yang	Swimming	Men's 50 metre backstroke S2
Gold	Tao Zheng	Swimming	Men's 100 metre backstroke S6
Gold	Du Jianping	Swimming	Men's 50 metre breaststroke SB2
Gold	Yang Bozun	Swimming	Men's 100 metre breaststroke SB11
Gold	Xu Qing	Swimming	Men's 50 metre butterfly S6
Gold	Pan Shiyun	Swimming	Men's 50 metre butterfly S7
Gold	Du Jianping	Swimming	Men's 150 metre individual medley SM3
Gold	Xu Qing	Swimming	Men's 200 metre individual medley SM6
Gold	Yang Bozun	Swimming	Men's 200 metre individual medley SM11
Gold	Lin Xiaobing; Lin Furong; Wang Yinan; Wei Yanpeng	Swimming	Men's 4 x 100 metre medley relay 34 points
Gold	Xia Jiangbo	Swimming	Women's 50 metre freestyle S3
Gold	Lin Ping	Swimming	Women's 50 metre freestyle S9
Gold	Xia Jiangbo	Swimming	Women's 100 metre freestyle S3
Gold	Feng Yazhu	Swimming	Women's 50 metre backstroke S2
Gold	Dong Lu	Swimming	Women's 100 metre backstroke S6
Gold	Feng Panfeng	Table tennis	Men's individual – Class 3
Gold	Zhao Shuai	Table tennis	Men's individual – Class 8
Gold	Ma Lin	Table tennis	Men's individual – Class 9
Gold	Feng Panfeng; Gao Yanming; Zhao Ping	Table tennis	Men's team - Class 3
Gold	Cao Ningning; Guo Xingyuan; Zhang Yan	Table tennis	Men's team - Class 4-5
Gold	Ge Yang; Lian Hao; Lu Xiaolei; Ma Lin	Table tennis	Men's team - Class 9-10
Gold	Liu Jing	Table tennis	Women's individual – Class 1–2
Gold	Zhou Ying	Table tennis	Women's individual – Class 4
Gold	Zhang Bian	Table tennis	Women's individual – Class 5
Gold	Mao Jingdian	Table tennis	Women's individual – Class 8
Gold	Lei Lina	Table tennis	Women's individual – Class 9
Gold	Li Qian; Liu Jing	Table tennis	Women's team - Class 1-3
Gold	Gu Gai; Zhang Bian; Zhang Miao; Zhou Ying	Table tennis	Women's team - Class 4-5
Gold	Fan Lei; Lei Lina; Liu Meili; Yang Qian	Table tennis	Women's team - Class 6-10
Gold	Li Liping; Lu Hong Qin (captain); Sheng Yu Hong; Su Li Mei; Tan Yanhua; Tang Xue Mei; Wang Yanan; Yang Yan Ling; Zhang Lijun; Zhang Xufei; Zheng Xiong Ying; Coach: Zhang Jun	Volleyball	Women's team
Gold	Ye Ruyi	Wheelchair fencing	Men's foil A
Gold	Hu Diaoliang	Wheelchair fencing	Men's foil B
Gold	Chen Yijun	Wheelchair fencing	Men's sabre A
Gold	Chen Yijun; Hu Daoliang; Ye Ruyi	Wheelchair fencing	Men's team open
Gold	Yao Fang	Wheelchair fencing	Women's foil B
Gold	Rong Jing; Wu Baili; Yao Fang	Wheelchair fencing	Women's team open

=== Silver medalists ===
Medal	Name	Sport	Event
Silver	Gao Fangxia; Xiao Yanhong; Yan Huilian	Archery	Women's team recurve
Silver	Liang Yongbin	Athletics	Men's 100 metres T37
Silver	Zhao Yufei	Athletics	Men's 100 metres T53
Silver	Liu Yang	Athletics	Men's 100 metres T54
Silver	Fu Xinhan	Athletics	Men's 200 metres T35
Silver	Shang Guangxu	Athletics	Men's 200 metres T37
Silver	Zhou Wenjun	Athletics	Men's 400 metres T38
Silver	Liu Fuliang; Liu Zhiming; Xie Hexing; Zhao Xu	Athletics	Men's 4 x 100 metre relay T42/46
Silver	Ma Yuxi	Athletics	Men's long jump F37/38
Silver	Xia Dong	Athletics	Men's discus throw F37/38
Silver	Wang Yanzhang	Athletics	Men's javelin throw F33/34
Silver	Hou Zhanbiao	Athletics	Men's shot put F46
Silver	Chen Junfei	Athletics	Women's 100 metres T38
Silver	Zhou Hongzhuan	Athletics	Women's 100 metres T53
Silver	Dong Hongjiao	Athletics	Women's 100 metres T54
Silver	Zhou Guohua; Guide: Li Jie	Athletics	Women's 200 metres T12
Silver	Dong Hongjiao	Athletics	Women's 400 metres T54
Silver	Huang Lisha	Athletics	Women's 800 metres T53
Silver	Cao Yuanhang; Chen Junfei; Liu Ping; Xiong Dezhi	Athletics	Women's 4x100 metres relay T35-38
Silver	Tang Hongxia	Athletics	Women's discus throw F11/12
Silver	Xu Qiuping	Athletics	Women's discus throw F37
Silver	Jia Qianqian	Athletics	Women's javelin throw F37/38
Silver	Jia Juntingxian	Athletics	Women's long jump F11/12
Silver	Li Duan	Athletics	Men's triple jump F11
Silver	Tang Hongxia	Athletics	Women's shot put F11/12
Silver	Wang Jun	Athletics	Women's shot put F35/36
Silver	Xu Qiuping	Athletics	Women's shot put F37
Silver	Meng Genjimisu	Athletics	Women's shot put F40
Silver	Yang Yue	Athletics	Women's shot put F42/44
Silver	Yan Zhiqiang	Boccia	Mixed individual BC2
Silver	Yuansen Zheng	Boccia	Mixed individual BC4
Silver	Yan Zhiqiang; Yuan Weibo; Zhang Qi; Zhong Kai	Boccia	Team BC1-2
Silver	Liang Guihua	Cycling	Men's time trial C2
Silver	Liu Xinyang	Cycling	Men's time trial C5
Silver	Liu Xinyang	Cycling	Men's road race C4-5
Silver	Li Zhangyu	Cycling	Men's individual pursuit C1
Silver	Chen Fengqing; Fan Feifei; Ju Zhen; Lin Shan; Wang Ruixue; Wang Shasha	Goalball	Women's team
Silver	Li Xiaodong	Judo	Men's -60kg
Silver	Zhao Xu	Judo	Men's -66kg
Silver	Song Wang	Judo	Men's +100kg
Silver	Wang Lijing	Judo	Women's -52kg
Silver	Zhou Tong	Judo	Women's -63kg
Silver	Gu Xiaofei	Powerlifting	Men's 82.5kg
Silver	Cai Huichao	Powerlifting	Men's 90kg
Silver	Qi Dong	Powerlifting	Men's 100kg
Silver	Zhe Cui	Powerlifting	Women's 40kg
Silver	Yang Yan	Powerlifting	Women's 60kg
Silver	Tan Yujiao	Powerlifting	Women's 67.5kg
Silver	Dang Shibei	Shooting	Women's 50m rifle 3 positions SH1
Silver	Pan Shiyun	Swimming	Men's 50 metre freestyle S7
Silver	Yang Bozun	Swimming	Men's 100 metre freestyle S11
Silver	Pan Shiyun	Swimming	Men's 400 metre freestyle S7
Silver	He Junquan	Swimming	Men's 50 metre backstroke S5
Silver	Jia Hongguang	Swimming	Men's 100 metre backstroke S6
Silver	Yang Bozun	Swimming	Men's 100 metre backstroke S11
Silver	Tao Zheng	Swimming	Men's 50 metre butterfly S6
Silver	Wei Yanpeng	Swimming	Men's 100 metre butterfly S8
Silver	Wang Jiachao	Swimming	Men's 200 metre individual medley SM8
Silver	Lin Furong; Song Maodang; Wang Jiachao; Wang Yinan	Swimming	Men's 4 x 100 metre freestyle relay 34 points
Silver	Li Guizhi	Swimming	Women's 50 metre freestyle S11
Silver	Song Lingling	Swimming	Women's 100 metre breaststroke SB5
Silver	Dong Lu	Swimming	Women's 50 metre butterfly S6
Silver	Zhang Yan	Table tennis	Men's individual - Class 4
Silver	Cao Ningning	Table tennis	Men's individual - Class 5
Silver	Ge Yang	Table tennis	Men's individual - Class 10
Silver	Gu Gai	Table tennis	Women's individual - Class 5
Silver	Yang Qian	Table tennis	Women's individual - Class 10
Silver	Chen Yijun	Wheelchair fencing	Men's foil A
Silver	Tian Jianquan	Wheelchair fencing	Men's sabre A
Silver	Wu Baili	Wheelchair fencing	Women's foil A

=== Bronze medalists ===
Medal	Name	Sport	Event
Bronze	Cheng Changjie; Dong Zhi; Li Zongshan	Archery	Men's team recurve
Bronze	Li Jinzhi	Archery	Women's individual recurve W1/W2
Bronze	Li Yansong	Athletics	Men's 100 metres T12
Bronze	Fu Xinhan	Athletics	Men's 100 metres T35
Bronze	Zhou Wenjun	Athletics	Men's 100 metres T38
Bronze	Yu Shiran	Athletics	Men's 100 metres T53
Bronze	Li Yansong	Athletics	Men's 200 metres T12
Bronze	Zhou Wenjun	Athletics	Men's 200 metres T38
Bronze	Zhao Yufei	Athletics	Men's 200 metres T53
Bronze	Liu Chengming	Athletics	Men's 400 metres T54
Bronze	Chen Hongjie	Athletics	Men's high jump F46
Bronze	Li Duan	Athletics	Men's long jump F11
Bronze	Dong Hewei	Athletics	Men's triple jump
Bronze	Wang Wenbo	Athletics	Men's discus throw F35/36
Bronze	Wang Lezheng	Athletics	Men's discus throw F42
Bronze	Wang Yanping	Athletics	Women's 100 metres T46
Bronze	Jia Juntingxian; Guide: Xu Donglin	Athletics	Women's 200 metres T11
Bronze	Zhu Daqing; Guide: Zhang Hui	Athletics	Women's 200 metres T12
Bronze	Zhou Hongzhuan	Athletics	Women's 200 metres T53
Bronze	Huang Lisha	Athletics	Women's 400 metres T53
Bronze	Zou Lihong	Athletics	Women's 800 metres T54
Bronze	Cao Yuanhang	Athletics	Women's long jump F37/38
Bronze	Ouyang Jingling	Athletics	Women's long jump F46
Bronze	Zhang Liangmin	Athletics	Women's shot put F11/12
Bronze	Wu Qing	Athletics	Women's shot put F35/36
Bronze	Meng Genjimisu	Athletics	Women's discus throw F40
Bronze	Li Zhangyu	Cycling	Men's time trial C1
Bronze	Zeng Sini	Cycling	Women's time trial C1-3
Bronze	Liu Xinyang	Cycling	Men's 1km time trial C4-5
Bronze	Liu Xinyang	Cycling	Men's individual pursuit C5
Bronze	Ruan Jianping	Cycling	Women's time trial C4-5
Bronze	Zhou Qian	Judo	Women's -70kg
Bronze	Wang Jian	Powerlifting	Men's 56kg
Bronze	Yang Quanxi	Powerlifting	Men's 60kg
Bronze	Hu Peng	Powerlifting	Men's 75kg
Bronze	Shi Shanshan	Powerlifting	Women's 48kg
Bronze	Xiao Cuijuan	Powerlifting	Women's 52kg
Bronze	Xu Yanmei	Powerlifting	Women's 82.5kg
Bronze	Dong Chao	Shooting	Men's 50m rifle 3 positions SH1
Bronze	Ni Hedong	Shooting	Mixed 50m pistol SH1
Bronze	Zhang Cuiping	Shooting	Mixed 10m air rifle prone SH1
Bronze	Tao Zheng	Swimming	Men's 50 metre freestyle S6
Bronze	Wang Yinan	Swimming	Men's 50 metre freestyle S8
Bronze	Yang Bozun	Swimming	Men's 400 metre freestyle S11
Bronze	Du Jianping	Swimming	Men's 50 metre backstroke S3
Bronze	Liu Xiaobing	Swimming	Men's 100 metre backstroke S9
Bronze	Lin Furong	Swimming	Men's 100 metre breaststroke SB9
Bronze	He Junquan	Swimming	Men's 50 metre butterfly S5
Bronze	Wang Jingang	Swimming	Men's 50 metre butterfly S7
Bronze	Song Maodang	Swimming	Men's 100 metre butterfly S8
Bronze	Li Hanhua	Swimming	Men's 150 metre individual medley SM3
Bronze	Tao Zheng	Swimming	Men's 200 metre individual medley SM6
Bronze	Jiang Shengnan	Swimming	Women's 50 metre freestyle S8
Bronze	Li Guizhi	Swimming	Women's 100 metre freestyle S11
Bronze	Song Lingling	Swimming	Women's 400 metre freestyle S6
Bronze	Bai Juan	Swimming	Women's 50 metre backstroke S4
Bronze	Jiang Fuying	Swimming	Women's 50 metre butterfly S6
Bronze	Huang Min	Swimming	Women's 50 metre butterfly S7
Bronze	Jiang Shengnan	Swimming	Women's 100 metre butterfly S8
Bronze	Huang Min	Swimming	Women's 200 metre individual medley SM7
Bronze	Jiang Shengnan	Swimming	Women's 200 metre individual medley SM8
Bronze	Zhang Meng	Swimming	Women's 200 metre individual medley SM10
Bronze	Liu Meili	Table tennis	Women's individual - Class 9
Bronze	Fan Lei	Table tennis	Women's individual - Class 10
Bronze	Wu Baili	Wheelchair fencing	Women's épée A

=== Multiple medalists ===
Multiple medalists
Name	Sport	1st place, gold medalist(s)	2nd place, silver medalist(s)	3rd place, bronze medalist(s)	Total
Wang Zhiming	Athletics	3	0	0	3
Yan Huilian	Archery	1	1	0	2
Zhou Guohua; Li jie (guide)	Athletics	1	1	0	2
Xue Lei; Wang Lin (guide)	Athletics	1	1	0	2
Zhang Liangmin	Athletics	1	0	1	2
Tang Hongxia	Athletics	0	2	0	2
Yan Zhiqiang	Boccia	0	2	0	2
Li Yansong	Athletics	0	1	2	3
Li Duan	Athletics	0	1	1	2
Jia Juntingxian	Athletics	0	1	1	2
Swimming
Xu Qing	Swimming	4	0	0	4
Yang Yang	Swimming	4	0	0	4
Yang Bozun	Swimming	3	2	1	6
Wang Yinan	Swimming	3	1	1	5
Pan Shiyun	Swimming	2	2	0	4
Du Jianping	Swimming	2	0	1	3
Xia Jiangbo	Swimming	2	0	0	2
Wang Jiachao	Swimming	1	2	0	3
Zheng Tao	Swimming	1	1	2	4
Song Maodang	Swimming	1	1	1	3
Lu Dong	Swimming	1	1	0	2
Wei Yanpeng	Swimming	1	1	0	2
Liu Xiaobing	Swimming	1	0	1	2
He Junquan	Swimming	0	1	1	2
Lin Furong	Swimming	0	1	1	2
Li Guizhi	Swimming	0	1	1	2
Song Lingling	Swimming	0	1	1	2
Jiang Shengnan	Swimming	0	0	3	3
Huang Min	Swimming	0	0	2	2
Table tennis
Feng Panfeng	Table tennis	2	0	0	2
Lei Lina	Table tennis	2	0	0	2
Liu Jing	Table tennis	2	0	0	2
Ma Lin	Table tennis	2	0	0	2
Zhang Bian	Table tennis	2	0	0	2
Zhou Ying	Table tennis	2	0	0	2
Cao Ningning	Table tennis	1	1	0	2
Ge Yang	Table tennis	1	1	0	2
Gu Gai	Table tennis	1	1	0	2
Yang Qian	Table tennis	1	1	0	2
Zhang Yan	Table tennis	1	1	0	2
Fan Lei	Table tennis	1	0	1	2
Liu Meili	Table tennis	1	0	1	2

== Archery ==
Men

Athlete	Event	Ranking round		Round of 32	Round of 16	Quarterfinals	Semifinals	Finals	
Athlete	Event	Score	Seed	Opposition score	Opposition score	Opposition score	Opposition score	Opposition score	Rank
Dong Zhi	Individual recurve standing	627	4	Bye	Kopiy (UKR) (13); L 5-6	Did not advance			
Li Zongshan	Individual recurve standing	605	10	Chayka (UKR) (23); L 4-6	Did not advance				
Cheng Changjie	Individual recurve W1/W2	626	3	Bye	Sanawi (MAS) (19); L 5-6	Did not advance			
Cheng Changjie; Dong Zhi; Li Zongshan	Team recurve	1858	3	—N/a	Bye	Italy (ITA) (6); W 194-185	Russia (RUS) (2); L 207-214	Great Britain (GBR) (1); W 206-193	3rd place, bronze medalist(s)

Women

Athlete	Event	Ranking round		Round of 32	Round of 16	Quarterfinals	Semifinals	Finals	
Athlete	Event	Score	Seed	Opposition score	Opposition score	Opposition score	Opposition score	Opposition score	Rank
Gao Fangxia	Individual recurve standing	581	1	Bye	Doboc (FRA) (17); W 6-0	Byambasuren (MGL) (8); L 0-6	Did not advance		
Yan Huilian	Individual recurve standing	573	3	Bye	Ford (USA) (19); W 6-4	Vennard (GBR) (6); W 6-0	Olszewska (POL) (2); W 6-2	Lee (KOR) (4); W 6-4	1st place, gold medalist(s)
Xiao Yanhong	Individual recurve W1/W2	560	3	Bye	Sidkova (CZE) (14); L 2-6	Did not advance			
Li Jinzhi	Individual recurve W1/W2	522	11	Bye	Volynets (UKR) (6); W 6-4	Sidkova (CZE) (14); W 6-5	Mijno (ITA) (2); L 4-6	Floreno (ITA) (12); W 6-4	3rd place, bronze medalist(s)
Xiao Yanhong; Gao Fangxia; Yan Huilian	Team recurve	1714	1	—N/a		Bye	Italy (ITA) (4); W 192-188	South Korea (KOR) (4); L 193-199	2nd place, silver medalist(s)

== Athletics ==
=== T/F11-13 ===
Men's Track

Athlete	Guide	Events	Heat		Semifinal		Final	
Athlete	Guide	Events	Time	Rank	Time	Rank	Time	Rank
Shang Baolong	Shi Yang	100 m T11	11.36	1 Q	11.24	2	Did not advance	
Xue Lei	Wang Lin	100 m T11	11.29	1 Q	11.16 AS	2 q	11.17	1st place, gold medalist(s)
Li Yansong	–	100 m T12	10.96	1 Q	—N/a		10.91 AS	3rd place, bronze medalist(s)
Yang Yuqing	–	100 m T12	11.16	3	—N/a		Did not advance	
Shang Baolong	Shi Yang	200 m T11	23.43	1 Q	23.22 AS	2	Did not advance	
Xue Lei	Wang Lin	200 m T11	23.66	3 q	25.91	4	Did not advance	
Li Yansong	–	200 m T12	22.40	1 Q	22.07	1 Q	22.04 AS	3rd place, bronze medalist(s)
Yang Yuqing	–	200 m T12	22.41	1 Q	22.30	2	Did not advance	
Yuan Yizhi	–	200 m T12	22.48	2 q	22.52	3	Did not advance	
Sun Qichao	–	400 m T12	50.91	1 Q	50.96	2	Did not advance	
Xue Lei; Li Yansong; Yang Yuqing; Yuan Yizhi	Wang Lin – – –	4 × 100 m relay T11-13	43.31	1 q	—N/a		42.68 AS	2nd place, silver medalist(s)

Men's Field

Athlete	Events	Mark (m)	Rank
Li Duan	Long jump F11	6.31	3rd place, bronze medalist(s)
Li Duan	Triple jump F11	12.75	2nd place, silver medalist(s)
Dong Hewei	Triple jump F12	14.20	3rd place, bronze medalist(s)
Zhu Pengkai	Javelin throw F12–13	64.38 WR	1st place, gold medalist(s)

Women's Track

Athlete	Guide	Events	Heat		Semifinal		Final	
Athlete	Guide	Events	Time	Rank	Time	Rank	Time	Rank
Jia Juntingxian	Xu Donglin	100 m T11	12.87	2 q	—N/a		12.79	4
Liu Miaomiao	Xu Donglin	100 m T12	13.51	4	Did not advance			
Zhou Guohua	Li Jie	100 m T12	11.91 WR	1 Q	12.11	1 Q	12.05	1st place, gold medalist(s)
Zhu Daqing	Zhang Hui	100 m T12	12.13	1 Q	12.52	1 Q	12.20	4
Jia Juntingxian	Xu Donglin	200 m T11	26.28	1 Q	26.25	1 Q	26.33	3rd place, bronze medalist(s)
Zhou Guohua	Li Jie	200 m T12	24.89	2 q	—N/a		24.66 AS	2nd place, silver medalist(s)
Zhu Daqing	Zhang Hui	200 m T12	24.80	1 Q	—N/a		24.88	3rd place, bronze medalist(s)
Zhu Daqing	Zhang Hui	400 m T12	59.58	1 Q	DSQ		Did not advance	

Women's Field

Athlete	Events	Mark (m)	Points	Rank
Jia Juntingxian	Long jump F11-12	4.73 AS	930	2nd place, silver medalist(s)
Liu Miaomiao	Long jump F11-12	5.19	705	9
Tang Hongxia	Shot put F11-12	12.47 AS	1008	2nd place, silver medalist(s)
Zhang Liangmin	Shot put F11-12	11.07	1003	3rd place, bronze medalist(s)
Tang Hongxia	Discus throw F11-12	39.91	994	2nd place, silver medalist(s)
Zhang Liangmin	Discus throw F11-12	40.13 PR	997	1st place, gold medalist(s)

=== T/F31-38 ===
Men's Track

Athlete	Events	Heat		Final	
Athlete	Events	Time	Rank	Time	Rank
Fu Xinhan	100 m T35	13.12	1 Q	13.12	3rd place, bronze medalist(s)
Che Mian	100 m T36	12.45	4 q	12.31	5
Xu Ran	100 m T36	12.86	3 Q	12.74	7
Liang Yongbin	100 m T37	11.63	1 Q	11.51 WR	2nd place, silver medalist(s)
Ma Yuxi	100 m T37	12.14	6	Did not advance	
Shang Guangxu	100 m T37	11.63	4 q	11.63	4
Zhou Wenjun	100 m T38	—N/a		11.22 AS	3rd place, bronze medalist(s)
Fu Xinhan	200 m T35	27.42	3 Q	26.21 AS	2nd place, silver medalist(s)
Che Mian	200 m T36	—N/a		25.25	5
Liang Yongbin	200 m T37	23.78	1 Q	23.40	4
Shang Guangxu	200 m T37	23.33	2 Q	23.15 AS	2nd place, silver medalist(s)
Zhou Wenjun	200 m T38	23.03	2 Q	22.65 AS	3rd place, bronze medalist(s)
Che Mian	400 m T36	—N/a		55.99 AS	4
Zhou Wenjun	400 m T38	52.57	2 Q	51.56 AS	2nd place, silver medalist(s)

Men's Field

Athlete	Events	Mark (m)	Points	Rank
Xu Ran	Long jump F36	5.07 AS	—N/a	5
Ma Yuxi	Long jump F37-38	6.26 AS	—N/a	2nd place, silver medalist(s)
Wang Yanzhang	Shot put F34	11.00	—N/a	8
Xia Dong	Shot put F37-38	17.52 WR	—N/a	1st place, gold medalist(s)
Wang Yanzhang	Discus throw F32-34	49.03 WR	1166	1st place, gold medalist(s)
Wang Wenbo	Discus throw F35-36	37.87	—N/a	3rd place, bronze medalist(s)
Xia Dong	Discus throw F37-38	55.81 WR	1071	2nd place, silver medalist(s)
Wang Yanzhang	Javelin throw F33-34	38.23	—N/a	2nd place, silver medalist(s)

Women's Track

Athlete	Events	Heat		Final	
Athlete	Events	Time	Rank	Time	Rank
Liu Ping	100 m T35	—N/a		15.44 WR	1st place, gold medalist(s)
Cao Yuanhang	100 m T37	14.76 AS	5	Did not advance	
Chen Junfei	100 m T38	14.00	1 Q	13.53 AS	2nd place, silver medalist(s)
Xiong Dezhi	100 m T38	14.07	2 Q	14.32	4
Liu Ping	200 m T35	—N/a		32.72	1st place, gold medalist(s)
Chen Junfei	200 m T38	28.29	1 Q	27.39 WR	1st place, gold medalist(s)
Xiong Dezhi	200 m T38	29.10	3 Q	28.62	4
Xiong Dezhi; Cao Yuanhang; Liu Ping; Chen Junfei	4 × 100 m relay T35-38	—N/a		55.65 AS	2nd place, silver medalist(s)

Women's Field

Athlete	Events	Mark (m)	Points	Rank
Cao Yuanhang	Long jump F37-38	4.40 PR	—N/a	3rd place, bronze medalist(s)
Bao Jiongyu	Shot put F35-36	8.47	729	7
Wang Jun	Shot put F35-36	12.07 AS	1056	2nd place, silver medalist(s)
Wu Qing	Shot put F35-36	10.64 WR	1041	3rd place, bronze medalist(s)
Jia Qianqian	Shot put F37	10.35	—N/a	7
Mi Na	Shot put F37	12.20 WR	—N/a	1st place, gold medalist(s)
Xu Qiuping	Shot put F37	11.04	—N/a	2nd place, silver medalist(s)
Bao Jiongyu	Discus throw F35-36	25.85 AS	910	4
Wu Qing	Discus throw F35-36	28.01 WR	1032	1st place, gold medalist(s)
Jia Qianqian	Discus throw F37	27.17	—N/a	6
Mi Na	Discus throw F37	35.35 WR	—N/a	1st place, gold medalist(s)
Xu Qiuping	Discus throw F37	32.08	—N/a	2nd place, silver medalist(s)
Jia Qianqian	Javelin throw F37-38	31.62 AS	—N/a	2nd place, silver medalist(s)
Mi Na	Javelin throw F37-38	28.48	—N/a	4

=== F40 ===
Men's Field

Athlete	Events	Mark (m)	Rank
Wang Zhiming	Shot put F40	14.46 WR	1st place, gold medalist(s)
Fan Chengcheng	Discus throw F40	33.19	8
Wang Zhiming	Discus throw F40	45.78 WR	1st place, gold medalist(s)
Fan Chengcheng	Javelin throw F40	41.48	5
Wang Zhiming	Javelin throw F40	47.95 WR	1st place, gold medalist(s)

Women's Field

Athlete	Events	Mark (m)	Rank
Meng Genjimisu	Shot put F40	9.13 AS	2nd place, silver medalist(s)
Meng Genjimisu	Discus throw F40	30.44 AS	3rd place, bronze medalist(s)

=== T/F42-46 ===
Men's track and road event

Athlete	Event	Heat		Final	
Athlete	Event	Result	Rank	Result	Rank
Liu Zhiming	100 m T44	11.84 AS	3 q	11.97	8
Jia Tianlei	100 m T44	12.49	7	Did not advance	
Zhao Xu	100 m T46	11.06 PR	1 Q	11.05 AS	1st place, gold medalist(s)
Yao Jianjun	100 m T46	11.43	5	Did not advance	
Jia Tianlei	200 m T44	25.62	6	Did not advance	
Yao Jianjun	200 m T46	22.68	3 q	22.81	5
Zhao Xu	200 m T46	22.62 PR	2 Q	DSQ	
Liu Zhiming	400 m T44	54.82 AS	3 Q	55.91	8
Xie Hexing	400 m T46	50.74	3 q	1:01.80	7
Yao Jianjun	400 m T46	54.36	6	Did not advance	
Lei Zhang	Marathon T46	—N/a		2:44:19	7
Liu Zhiming; Liu Fuliang; Xie Hexing; Zhao Xu	4 × 100 m relay T42-46	—N/a		42.98 AS	2nd place, silver medalist(s)

Men's field

Athlete	Event	Mark (m)	Points	Rank
Wang Qiuhong	Long jump F42-44	6.27 AS	788	6
Guo Weizhong	Long jump F42-44	4.06	312	11
Liu Fuliang	Long jump F46	7.15 AS	—N/a	1st place, gold medalist(s)
Chen Hongjie	Long jump F46	5.93	—N/a	9
Liu Fuliang	Triple jump F46	15.20 WR	—N/a	1st place, gold medalist(s)
Guo Weizhong	High jump F42	1.71	—N/a	4
Chen Hongjie	High jump F46	2.01 PR	—N/a	3rd place, bronze medalist(s)
Wang Qiuhong	High jump F46	1.85	—N/a	6
Kang Guofeng	Shot put F42-44	13.41	935	4
Hou Zhanbiao	Shot put F46	15.57 AS	—N/a	2nd place, silver medalist(s)
Wang Lezheng	Discus throw F42	42.81	—N/a	3rd place, bronze medalist(s)
Kang Guofeng	Discus throw F42	40.77	—N/a	5
Fu Yanlong	Discus throw F42	36.54	—N/a	9
Fu Yanlong	Javelin throw F42	52.79 WR	—N/a	1st place, gold medalist(s)
Gao Mingjie	Javelin throw F44	58.53 PR	—N/a	1st place, gold medalist(s)

Women's track event

Athlete	Event	Heat		Final	
Athlete	Event	Result	Rank	Result	Rank
Wang Juan	100 m T44	13.88	3 Q	14.11	6
Ouyang Jingling	100 m T46	DNS		Did not advance	
Wang Yanping	100 m T46	18.82 AS	1 Q	12.89	3rd place, bronze medalist(s)
Wang Yanping	200 m T46	26.55	2 Q	26.38 AS	5
Wang Yanping	400 m T46	—N/a		1:01.33	4

Women's field

Athlete	Event	Mark (m)	Points	Rank
Wang Juan	Long jump F42-44	4.80 AS	965	7
Ouyang Jingling	Long jump F46	5.41 AS	—N/a	3rd place, bronze medalist(s)
Yao Juan	Shot put F42-44	13.05 WR	1055	1st place, gold medalist(s)
Yang Yue	Shot put F42-44	12.22	980	2nd place, silver medalist(s)
Zhao Hongmei	Javelin throw F46	38.41 AS	—N/a	4

=== T/F51-58 ===
Men's track and road event

Athlete	Event	Heat		Final	
Athlete	Event	Result	Rank	Result	Rank
Zhao Yufei	100 m T53	15.15	2 Q	15.09	2nd place, silver medalist(s)
Yu Shiran	100 m T53	15.06	2 Q	15.20	3rd place, bronze medalist(s)
Liu Yang	100 m T54	13.91 AS	1 Q	13.92	2nd place, silver medalist(s)
Cui Yanfeng	100 m T54	14.00	1 Q	14.11	4
Li Huzhao	200 m T53	26.08 PR	1 Q	25.61 PR	1st place, gold medalist(s)
Zhao Yufei	200 m T53	26.46	1 Q	26.00	3rd place, bronze medalist(s)
Yu Shiran	200 m T53	26.17	1 Q	26.46	5
Li Huzhao	400 m T53	51.19	1 Q	49.70	1st place, gold medalist(s)
Yu Shiran	400 m T53	51.74	2 Q	50.92	4
Zhang Lixin	400 m T54	48.73	1 Q	46.88	1st place, gold medalist(s)
Liu Chengming	400 m T54	48.01	1 Q	47.36	3rd place, bronze medalist(s)
Cui Yanfeng	400 m T54	48.28	3 q	51.20	7
Li Huzhao	800 m T53	1:46.08	1 Q	1:41.83	4
Zhao Yufei	800 m T53	1:42.75	6	Did not advance	
Zhang Lixin	800 m T54	1:37.54	1 Q	DSQ	
Liu Chengming	1500 m T54	3:19.35	2 Q	3:12.86	6
Liu Yang	1500 m T54	3:15.07	3 Q	3:13.63	8
Zhang Lixin	1500 m T54	3:11.40	4 q	3:14.05	9
Liu Chengming	5000 m T54	11:29.06	2 Q	11:09.65	8
Liu Chengming	Marathon T54	—N/a		DNF	
Liu Yang; Liu Chengming; Li Huzhao; Zhang Lixin	4 × 400 m relay T53-54	3:08.27	1 q	3:05.46 WR	1st place, gold medalist(s)

Men's field event

Athlete	Event	Mark (m)	Points	Rank
Wu Guoshan	Shot put F57-58	15.40 AS	944	5
Fan Liang	Discus throw F54-56	29.02	919	7
Zhang Yang	Discus throw F57-58	51.50	894	6
Xu Chongyao	Javelin throw F57-58	45.48	943	6

Women's track event

Athlete	Event	Heat		Final	
Athlete	Event	Result	Rank	Result	Rank
Huang Lisha	100 m T53	—N/a		16.42	1st place, gold medalist(s)
Zhou Hongzhuan	100 m T53	—N/a		16.90	2nd place, silver medalist(s)
Liu Wenjun	100 m T54	16.10 AS	1 Q	15.82 WR	1st place, gold medalist(s)
Dong Hongjiao	100 m T54	16.21	1 Q	15.86	2nd place, silver medalist(s)
Huang Lisha	200 m T53	—N/a		29.18	1st place, gold medalist(s)
Zhou Hongzhuan	200 m T53	—N/a		29.40	3rd place, bronze medalist(s)
Zhou Hongzhuan	400 m T53	—N/a		55.47	1st place, gold medalist(s)
Huang Lisha	400 m T53	—N/a		56.87	3rd place, bronze medalist(s)
Dong Hongjiao	400 m T54	56.19	2 Q	55.43 AS	2nd place, silver medalist(s)
Zou Lihong	400 m T54	56.23	1 Q	56.57	4
Zhou Hongzhuan	400 m T53	—N/a		1:52.85 PR	1st place, gold medalist(s)
Huang Lisha	400 m T53	—N/a		1:53.10	2nd place, silver medalist(s)
Zou Lihong	800 m T54	1:56.36	1 Q	1:50.31	3rd place, bronze medalist(s)
Dong Hongjiao	800 m T54	1:55.92	2 Q	1:50.62	4
Liu Wenjun	800 m T54	1:48.49 AS	2 Q	1:51.34	6
Zou Lihong	1500 m T54	3:31.93	1 Q	3:37.91	5
Liu Wenjun	5000 m T54	13:12.11	2 Q	12:28.93	5
Zou Lihong	5000 m T54	DNF		Did not advance	

Women's field event

Athlete	Event	Mark (m)	Points	Rank
Yang Liwan	Shot put F54-56	7.50 WR	1057	1st place, gold medalist(s)
Li Ling	Shot put F57-58	8.92	826	10
Liu Ming	Discus throw F57-58	22.66	695	10
Li Ling	Discus throw F57-58	NM		
Yang Liwan	Javelin throw F54-56	17.89	—N/a	1st place, gold medalist(s)
Liu Ming	Javelin throw F57-58	23.48 AS	955	1st place, gold medalist(s)
Qing Suping	Javelin throw F57-58	20.42	845	5
Li Ling	Javelin throw F57-58	18.63	757	9

== Boccia ==
Individual

Athlete	Event	Seeding Matches	Round of 32	Round of 16	Quarterfinals	Semifinals	Final	
Athlete	Event	Opposition Result	Opposition Result	Opposition Result	Opposition Result	Opposition Result	Opposition Result	Rank
Yuanb Weibo	Individual BC1	Bye		Huadpradit (THA); L 1-5	Did not advance			
Zhang Qi	Individual BC1	Bye		Wong (HKG); W 9-1	Smith (GBR); L 2-4	Semi-finals 5-8; Huadpradit (THA); W 6-3	Play-off 5-6; Fernandes (POR); L 3-2	6
Yan Zhiqiang	Individual BC2	Bye		Mezik (SVK); W 6-5	Valente (POR); W 7-5	Jeong (KOR); W 5-2	Sousa Santos (BRA); L 0-8	2nd place, silver medalist(s)
Zhong Kai	Individual BC2	Bye	Kwok (HKG); W 3-2	Gonçalves (POR); W 4-3	Murray (GBR); W 3-1	Sousa Santos (BRA); L 7-1	Bronze Medal Match; Jeong (KOR); L 1-5	4
Zheng Yuansen	Individual BC4	Dueso Villar (ESP); W 9-0	—N/a	Durkovic (SVK); W 7-1	Lau (HKG); W 3-1	McGuire (GBR); W 12-0	Pinto (BRA); L 3-3	2nd place, silver medalist(s)

Teams

Athlete	Event	Group Stage			Quarterfinals	Semifinals	Final	
Athlete	Event	Opposition Result	Opposition Result	Rank	Opposition Result	Opposition Result	Opposition Result	Rank
Yuan Weibo; Zhang Qi; Yan Zhiqiang; Zhong Kai	Team BC1-2	Canada (CAN); W 5-5	Thailand (THA); L 3-8	2	South Korea (KOR); W 6-6	Portugal (POR); W 6-4	Thailand (THA); L 5-10	2nd place, silver medalist(s)

== Cycling ==
=== Road ===
Men

Athlete	Event	Time	Rank
Li Zhang Yu	Road Race C1-3	DNF	
Li Zhang Yu	Time Trial C1	26:23.11	3rd place, bronze medalist(s)
Liang Guihua	Road Race C1-3	DNF	
Liang Guihua	Time Trial C2	24:40.33	2nd place, silver medalist(s)
Xie Hao	Road Race C1-3	DNF	
Xie Hao	Time Trial C2	29:22.79	15
Ji Xiaofei	Road Race C4-5	DNF	
Ji Xiaofei	Time Trial C4	37:06.71	10
Liu Xinyang	Road Race C4-5	1:55:48	2nd place, silver medalist(s)
Liu Xinyang	Time Trial C5	32:21.03	2nd place, silver medalist(s)

Women

Athlete	Event	Time	Rank
He Yin	Road Race C1-3	DNF	
He Yin	Time Trial C1-3	29:28.07	5
Zeng Sini	Road Race C1-3	1:29:02	1st place, gold medalist(s)
Zeng Sini	Time Trial C1-3	27:57.16	3rd place, bronze medalist(s)
Ruan Jianping	Road Race C4-5	1:57:17	11
Ruan Jianping	Time Trial C4	30:16.66	5

=== Track ===
Time Trial

Athlete	Event	Factored Time	Rank
Li Zhang Yu	Men's 1 km time trial C1-3	1:05.021 WR	1st place, gold medalist(s)
Liang Guihua	Men's 1 km time trial C1-3	1:10.211	5
Xie Hao	Men's 1 km time trial C1-3	1:10.229	6
Ji Xiaofei	Men's 1 km time trial C4-5	1:08.860	5
Liu Xinyang	Men's 1 km time trial C4-5	1:07.638	3rd place, bronze medalist(s)
He Yin	Women's 500 m time trial C1-3	39.158 WR	1st place, gold medalist(s)
Zeng Sini	Women's 500 m time trial C1-3	43.207	5
Ruan Jianping	Women's 500 m time trial C4-5	38.194 WR	3rd place, bronze medalist(s)

Individual Pursuit

Athlete	Event	Qualification		Final	
Athlete	Event	Time	Rank	Time	Rank
Li Zhang Yu	Men's individual pursuit C1	4:00.235	2 Q	4:01.826	2nd place, silver medalist(s)
Liang Guihua	Men's individual pursuit C2	3:45.828	1 Q	3:45.243 WR	1st place, gold medalist(s)
Xie Hao	Men's individual pursuit C2	4:11.586	9	Did not advance	
Ji Xiaofei	Men's individual pursuit C4	5:07.453	10	Did not advance	
Liu Xinyang	Men's individual pursuit C5	4:35.386	3 Q	4:38.443	3rd place, bronze medalist(s)
He Yin	Women's individual pursuit C1-3	4:34.515	6	Did not advance	
Zeng Sini	Women's individual pursuit C1-3	4:19.841 WR	1 Q	4:20.820	1st place, gold medalist(s)
Jianping Ruan	Women's individual pursuit C4	4:13.766	5	Did not advance	

Team sprint

Athlete	Event	Qualification		Final	
Athlete	Event	Time	Rank	Time	Rank
Xie Hao; Ji Xiaofei; Liu Xinyang	Mixed team sprint C1-5	49.804	1 Q	49.454 WR	1st place, gold medalist(s)

== Football 5-a-side ==
China has qualified for the football 5-a-side tournament.

The following is the China squad in the football 5-a-side tournament of the 2012 Summer Paralympics.

No.	Pos.	Player	Age	Club
1	GK	Huachu Xu	21	Fujian
2	DF	Kai Gao	25	Fujian
3	MF	Shanyong Chen	24	Jiangsu
5	DF	Xiaoqiang Li	30	Yunnan
6	FW	Dongdong Lin	22	Fujian
8	DF	Lijing Zhang	18	Liaoning
9	MF	Zhoubin Wang	22	Fujian
10	FW	Wenfa Zheng	20	Liaoning
11	FW	Yafeng Wang	22	Fujian
12	GK	Lei Niu	25	Hebei

Group play

Pos	Team	Pld	W	D	L	GF	GA	GD	Pts	Qualification or relegation
1	Brazil (BRA)	3	2	1	0	5	0	+5	7	Qualified for the medal round
2	France (FRA)	3	1	2	0	1	0	+1	5	Qualified for the medal round
3	China (CHN)	3	1	1	1	4	1	+3	4	Qualified for the classification round
4	Turkey (TUR)	3	0	0	3	0	9	−9	0	Qualified for the classification round

31 August 2012
11:00

China	4–0	Turkey
Wenfa Zheng 2', 50'; Xiaoqiang Li 13' (pen.); Yafeng Wang 46'	Report

Riverbank Arena
Attendance: 1,938
Referee: Paul Leversuch (Germany)

2 September 2012
11:00

France	0–0	China
	Report

Riverbank Arena
Attendance: 1,554
Referee: Paul Leversuch (Great Britain)

4 September 2012
9:00

Brazil	1–0	China
Conceição 22'	Report

Riverbank Arena
Attendance: 931
Referee: Germinal Lubrano (Argentina)

5th–8th place semi-finals

6 September 2012
9:00

China	1–1 (a.e.t.)	Great Britain
Li 40' (pen.)	Report	English 47'
Penalties
Li (penalty scored); Wang (penalty scored)	2–1	(penalty missed) Clarke; (penalty scored) English; (penalty missed) Seal

Riverbank Arena
Attendance: 1,893
Referee: Juan Carlos Paule (Spain)

5th–6th place match

8 September 2012
11:15

Iran	0–0 (a.e.t.)	China
	Report
Penalties
Shalhavizadeh (penalty missed); Ardekani (penalty missed); Haftdaran (penalty missed)	0–1	(penalty missed) Zhoubin; (penalty scored) Yafeng; (penalty missed) Dongdong

Riverbank Arena
Attendance: 1,603
Referee: François Carcouët (France)

== Goalball ==
=== Men's tournament ===
Roster

- Daolei Bao
- Changgui Cai
- Liangliang Chen
- Jinran Du
- Shuai Shao
- Yongquan Yao

Group B

Team	Pld	W	D	L	GF	GA	GD	Pts	Qualification
Iran	5	4	0	1	32	20	+12	12	Quarterfinals
China	5	3	1	1	20	14	+6	10	Quarterfinals
Belgium	5	3	1	1	19	16	+3	10	Quarterfinals
Algeria	5	2	0	3	18	17	+1	6	Quarterfinals
South Korea	5	1	0	4	18	28	−10	3	Eliminated
Canada	5	1	0	4	16	28	−12	3	Eliminated

Source: "London 2012 Paralympic Games - Goalball results" (PDF). Paralympic.org. 2012-10-03 – via Goalball.sport.

30 August 2012; 13:45	China	5 – 9	Iran	Copper Box, London; Referees: Launel Scott (CAN), Bülent Kimyon (TUR)
30 August 2012; 13:45	Yao 3 Chen 2	Report	Sayahi 9	Copper Box, London; Referees: Launel Scott (CAN), Bülent Kimyon (TUR)

31 August 2012; 18:30	China	11 – 4	South Korea	Copper Box, London; Referees: Morten Hammershoi (DEN), Christl Daentler (GER)
31 August 2012; 18:30	Yao 6 Chen 5	Report	C-H Kim 2 N-O Kim 1 Hong 1	Copper Box, London; Referees: Morten Hammershoi (DEN), Christl Daentler (GER)

1 September 2012; 19:45	Algeria	0 – 1	China	Copper Box, London; Referees: Dina Murdie (GBR), Ali Aldarsony (KSA)
1 September 2012; 19:45		Report	Yao 1	Copper Box, London; Referees: Dina Murdie (GBR), Ali Aldarsony (KSA)

2 September 2012; 15:00	Belgium	0 – 0	China	Copper Box, London; Referees: Hooshang Shariati (IRI), Warrick Jackes (AUS)
2 September 2012; 15:00		Report		Copper Box, London; Referees: Hooshang Shariati (IRI), Warrick Jackes (AUS)

3 September 2012; 11:30	China	3 – 1	Canada	Copper Box, London; Referees: Ali Aldarsony (KSA), Christl Daentler (GER)
3 September 2012; 11:30	Chen 2 Yao 1	Report	Gaulin 1	Copper Box, London; Referees: Ali Aldarsony (KSA), Christl Daentler (GER)

Quarter-final

5 September 2012; 18:00	China	4 – 12	Lithuania	Copper Box, London; Referees: Bülent Kimyon (TUR), Carla Da Matta (BRA)
5 September 2012; 18:00	Chen 2 Yongquan 2	Report	Zibolis 6 Juchna 4 Leonavičius 1 Pavliukianec 1	Copper Box, London; Referees: Bülent Kimyon (TUR), Carla Da Matta (BRA)

=== Women's tournament ===
Roster

- Fengqing Chen
- Feifei Fan
- Zhen Ju
- Lin Shan
- Ruixue Wang
- Shasha Wang

Group C

Team	Pld	W	D	L	GF	GA	GD	Pts	Qualification
China	4	4	0	0	28	4	+24	12	Quarterfinals
Great Britain	4	2	1	1	10	9	+1	7	Quarterfinals
Brazil	4	2	0	2	8	15	−7	6	Quarterfinals
Finland	4	1	1	2	10	13	−3	4	Quarterfinals
Denmark	4	0	0	4	3	18	−15	0	Eliminated

Source: "London 2012 Paralympic Games - Goalball results" (PDF). Paralympic.org. 2012-10-03 – via Goalball.sport.

30 August 2012; 18:30	China	7 – 1	Great Britain	Copper Box, London; Referees: Janned Ahokas (FIN), Dawna Christy (CAN)
30 August 2012; 18:30	Wang R. 4 Chen 2 Lin 1	Report	Sharkey 1	Copper Box, London; Referees: Janned Ahokas (FIN), Dawna Christy (CAN)

31 August 2012; 16:15	Brazil	0 – 8	China	Copper Box, London; Referees: Juha Vuokila (FIN), Dina Murdie (GBR)
31 August 2012; 16:15		Report	Wang S. 5 Chen 1 Lin 1 Ju 1	Copper Box, London; Referees: Juha Vuokila (FIN), Dina Murdie (GBR)

3 September 2012; 13:45	China	8 – 1	Denmark	Copper Box, London; Referees: Tony Connolly (USA), Ali Aldarsony (KSA)
3 September 2012; 13:45	Chen 4 Wang S. 3 Ju 1	Report	Jørgensen 1	Copper Box, London; Referees: Tony Connolly (USA), Ali Aldarsony (KSA)

4 September 2012; 10:15	Finland	2 – 5	China	Copper Box, London; Referees: Bulent Kimyon (TUR), Launel Scott (CAN)
4 September 2012; 10:15	Hynninen 1 Somerkivi 1	Report	Wang R. 4 Chen 1	Copper Box, London; Referees: Bulent Kimyon (TUR), Launel Scott (CAN)

Quarter-final

5 September 2012; 09:00	China	5 – 0	United States	Copper Box, London; Referees: Dawna Christy (CAN), Juha Vuokila (FIN)
5 September 2012; 09:00	Chen 2 Wang S. 2 Lin 1	Report		Copper Box, London; Referees: Dawna Christy (CAN), Juha Vuokila (FIN)

Semi-final

6 September 2012; 13:30	China	4 – 1	Finland	Copper Box, London; Referees: Dawna Christy (CAN), Carla Da Matta (BRA)
6 September 2012; 13:30	Chen 2 Lin 1 Wang S. 1	Report	Leppänen 1	Copper Box, London; Referees: Dawna Christy (CAN), Carla Da Matta (BRA)

Final

7 September 2012; 15:00	China	0 – 1	Japan	Copper Box, London
7 September 2012; 15:00		Report	Adachi 1	Copper Box, London

== Judo ==
Athlete	Event	Round of 16	Quarterfinals	Semifinals	First Repechage Round	Repechage Semifinals	Final/BM	
Athlete	Event	Opposition Result	Opposition Result	Opposition Result	Opposition Result	Opposition Result	Opposition Result	Rank
Li Xiaodong	Men's 60 kg	Bye	Hawthorne (USA); W 100-000	Noura (ALG); W 100-000	Bye		Ibrahimov (AZE); L 000-1011	2nd place, silver medalist(s)
Zhao Xu	Men's 66 kg	Bye	Murstafayev (AZE); W 001-0002	Hirose (JPN); W 100-000	Bye		Khorova (UKR); L 000-100	2nd place, silver medalist(s)
Wang Song	Men's +100 kg	Park (KOR); W 100-0001	Montero (VEN); W 020-0003	Silva (BRA); W 020-000	Bye		Masaki (JPN); L 000-100	2nd place, silver medalist(s)
Xiaoli Huang	Women's 48 kg	—N/a	Ferreira (BRA); L 000-0011	Did not advance	—N/a	Laclau (FRA); W 024-0002	Halinska (UKR); L 000-100	5
Wang Lijing	Women's 52 kg	—N/a	Hangai (JPN); W 021-0001	Martinet (FRA); W 0102-0011	—N/a	Bye	Brussig (GER); L 000-100	2nd place, silver medalist(s)
Zhou Tong	Women's 63 kg	—N/a	Koseoglu (TUR); W 020-000	Bernardes (BRA); W 0021-0001	—N/a	Bye	Rodriguez (CUB); L 000-100	2nd place, silver medalist(s)
Zhou Qian	Women's 70 kg	—N/a	Garcia (USA); W 022-000	Herrera (ESP); L 0002-001	—N/a	Bye	Ruvalcaba (BLR); W 020-000	3rd place, bronze medalist(s)
Yanping Yuan	Women's +70 kg	—N/a	Bouazoug (ALG); W 020-000	Silva (BRA); W 101-000	—N/a	Bye	Akin (TUR); W 100-000	1st place, gold medalist(s)

== Powerlifting ==
Men

Athlete	Event	Result	Rank
Feng Qi	-52kg	176	1st place, gold medalist(s)
Wang Jian	-56kg	185	3rd place, bronze medalist(s)
Yang Quanxi	-60kg	185	3rd place, bronze medalist(s)
Liu Lei	-67.5kg	218	1st place, gold medalist(s)
Hu Peng	-75kg	213	3rd place, bronze medalist(s)
Gu Xiao Fei	-82.5kg	228	2nd place, silver medalist(s)
Cai Huichao	-90kg	233	2nd place, silver medalist(s)
Qi Dong	-100kg	242	2nd place, silver medalist(s)

Women

Athlete	Event	Result	Rank
Cui Zhe	-40kg	97	2nd place, silver medalist(s)
Shi Shanshan	-48kg	114	3rd place, bronze medalist(s)
Xiao Cuijuan	-52kg	118	3rd place, bronze medalist(s)
Cui Jianjin	-56kg	110	4
Yang Yan	-60kg	125	2nd place, silver medalist(s)
Tan Yujiao	-67.5kg	139	2nd place, silver medalist(s)
Fu Taoying	-75kg	146	1st place, gold medalist(s)
Xu Yanmei	-82.5kg	129	3rd place, bronze medalist(s)

== Rowing ==
Athlete	Event	Heats		Repechage		Final	
Athlete	Event	Time	Rank	Time	Rank	Time	Rank
Huang Cheng	Men's single sculls	4:45.02	1 FA	Bye		4:52.36	1st place, gold medalist(s)
Fei Tianming; Lou Xiaoxian	Mixed Double Sculls	3:54.92	1 FA	Bye		3:57.63	1st place, gold medalist(s)
Feng Xuebin; Wang Qian; Wu Yunlong; Zhao Hui; Yu Li (Cox)	Mixed Coxed Four	3:24.82	4 R	3:25.03	2 FA	3:23.43	4

== Shooting ==
Athlete	Event	Qualification		Final	
Athlete	Event	Score	Rank	Score	Rank
Dang Shibei	Women's 10 m air rifle standing SH1	389	10	Did not advance	
Dang Shibei	Women's 50 m rifle 3 positions SH1	576	2 Q	671.7	2nd place, silver medalist(s)
Dang Shibei	Mixed 50 m rifle prone SH1	581	24	Did not advance	
Dong Chao	Men's 10 m air rifle standing SH1	596	1 Q	699.5	1st place, gold medalist(s)
Dong Chao	Men's 50 m rifle 3 positions SH1	1152	3 Q	1251.5	3rd place, bronze medalist(s)
Dong Chao	Mixed 10 m air rifle prone SH1	599	13	Did not advance	
Dong Chao	Mixed 50 m rifle prone SH1	588	9	Did not advance	
Dingchao Gou	Men's 10 m air rifle standing SH1	589	9	Did not advance	
Dingchao Gou	Men's 50 m rifle 3 positions SH1	1126	12	Did not advance	
He Huan	Women's 10 m air rifle standing SH1	394	13	Did not advance	
He Huan	Women's 50 m rifle 3 positions SH1	551	10	Did not advance	
He Huan	Mixed 10 m air rifle prone SH1	594	34	Did not advance	
Li Jianfei	Men's 10 m air pistol SH1	551	24	Did not advance	
Li Jianfei	Mixed 25 m pistol SH1	567	3 Q	770.3	1st place, gold medalist(s)
Li Jianfei	Mixed 50 m pistol SH1	545	3	624.5	4
Ni Hedong	Men's 10 m air pistol SH1	562	10	Did not advance	
Ni Hedong	Mixed 25 m pistol SH1	563	5 Q	762.0	6
Ni Hedong	Mixed 50 m pistol SH1	535	4	625.3	3rd place, bronze medalist(s)
Ru Decheng	Men's 10 m air pistol SH1	562	9	Did not advance	
Ru Decheng	Mixed 50 m pistol SH1	532	6	612.6	8
Hongxiang Yuan	Mixed 10 m air rifle prone SH2	599	16	Did not advance	
Hongxiang Yuan	Mixed 10 m air rifle standing SH2	598; SO: 51.0	12	Did not advance	
Zhang Cuiping	Women's 10 m air rifle standing SH1	396	1 Q	500.9	1st place, gold medalist(s)
Zhang Cuiping	Women's 50 m rifle 3 positions SH1	577	1 Q	676.6	1st place, gold medalist(s)
Zhang Cuiping	Mixed 10 m air rifle prone SH1	600	1 Q	705.8	3rd place, bronze medalist(s)
Zhang Cuiping	Mixed 50 m rifle prone SH1	586	15	Did not advance	

== Swimming ==
=== Men ===
Athletes	Event	Heat		Final	
Athletes	Event	Time	Rank	Time	Rank
Yang Yang	50 m freestyle S2	1:01.05	1 Q	1:01.39	1st place, gold medalist(s)
Xu Qing	50 m freestyle S6	30.11	2 Q	28.57 WR	1st place, gold medalist(s)
Zheng Tao	50 m freestyle S6	30.33	3 Q	30.06	3rd place, bronze medalist(s)
Tang Yuan	50 m freestyle S6	31.99	5 Q	32.20	7
Pan Shiyun	50 m freestyle S7	28.97 AS	5 Q	28.09 AS	2nd place, silver medalist(s)
Wang Yinan	50 m freestyle S8	26.74	3 Q	26.31 AS	3rd place, bronze medalist(s)
Yang Feng	50 m freestyle S8	27.41	5 Q	27.38	5
Guo Jun	50 m freestyle S8	27.86	9	Did not advance	
Lin Furong	50 m freestyle S10	25.25 AS	8 Q	24.86 AS	7
Yang Bozun	50 m freestyle S11	25.33 WR	1 Q	25.27 WR	1st place, gold medalist(s)
Yang Yang	100 m freestyle S2	2:10.47 WR	1 Q	2:03.71 WR	1st place, gold medalist(s)
Xu Qing	100 m freestyle S6	1:12.29	8 Q	1:05.82 PR	1st place, gold medalist(s)
Tang Yuan	100 m freestyle S6	1:12.76	9	Did not advance	
Pan Shiyun	100 m freestyle S7	1:04.23	5 Q	1:00.57 AS	1st place, gold medalist(s)
Wang Yinan	100 m freestyle S8	58.97	2 Q	56.58 WR	1st place, gold medalist(s)
Song Maodang	100 m freestyle S8	1:00.34	5 Q	59.86	5
Yang Bozun	100 m freestyle S11	57.35 AS	2 Q	58.61	2nd place, silver medalist(s)
Yang Yang	200 m freestyle S2	—N/a		4:36.18 PR	1st place, gold medalist(s)
Pan Shiyun	400 m freestyle S7	4:53.37 AS	5 Q	4:46.22 AS	2nd place, silver medalist(s)
Wang Yinan	400 m freestyle S8	4:37.86	4 Q	4:27.11 AS	1st place, gold medalist(s)
Wang Jiachao	400 m freestyle S8	4:47.34	8 Q	4:39.08	5
Yang Bozun	400 m freestyle S11	4:48.03	2 Q	4:41.73 AS	3rd place, bronze medalist(s)
Yang Yang	50 m backstroke S2	1:01.35 WR	1 Q	1:00.90 WR	1st place, gold medalist(s)
Du Jianping	50 m backstroke S3	51.56	3 Q	46.48	3rd place, bronze medalist(s)
Li Hanhua	50 m backstroke S3	55.72	6 Q	52.03	5
He Junquan	50 m backstroke S5	37.02	2 Q	36.41	2nd place, silver medalist(s)
Zheng Tao	100 m backstroke S6	1:16.37	2 Q	1:13.56 WR	1st place, gold medalist(s)
Jia Hongguang	100 m backstroke S6	1:14.98 AS	1 Q	1:14.64	2nd place, silver medalist(s)
Gao Nan	100 m backstroke S7	1:15.05 AS	8 Q	1:14.71 AS	7
Yang Xiusen	100 m backstroke S8	1:13.75	10	Did not advance	
Liu Xiaobing	100 m backstroke S9	1:04.91	3 Q	1:03.73	3rd place, bronze medalist(s)
Yang Bozun	100 m backstroke S11	1:08.92	1 Q	1:08.07	2nd place, silver medalist(s)
Du Jianping	50 m breaststroke SB2	57.83 AS	1 Q	57.50 AS	1st place, gold medalist(s)
Li Hanhua	50 m breaststroke SB2	1:07.82	10	Did not advance	
Chen Jianfeng	100 m breaststroke SB7	DNS		Did not advance	
Zhao Xueming	100 m breaststroke SB8	1:18.49	14	Did not advance	
Liu Ruijin	100 m breaststroke SB8	1:17.63	9	Did not advance	
Lin Furong	100 m breaststroke SB9	1:09.35 AS	3 Q	1:07.40 AS	3rd place, bronze medalist(s)
Yang Bozun	100 m breaststroke SB11	1:10.65 AS	1 Q	1:10.11 WR	1st place, gold medalist(s)
He Junquan	50 m butterfly S5	37.26	3 Q	37.20	3rd place, bronze medalist(s)
Xu Qing	50 m butterfly S6	31.37	1 Q	29.90 WR	1st place, gold medalist(s)
Zheng Tao	50 m butterfly S6	32.37	3 Q	30.27	2nd place, silver medalist(s)
Luo Fangyu	50 m butterfly S6	32.94	5 Q	32.26	4
Pan Shiyun	50 m butterfly S7	32.42	5 Q	29.49 WR	1st place, gold medalist(s)
Wang Jingang	50 m butterfly S7	32.25	3 Q	30.75	3rd place, bronze medalist(s)
Yang Yuanrun	50 m butterfly S7	32.36	4 Q	DSQ	
Wei Yanpeng	100 m butterfly S8	1:02.93	3 Q	1:01.66	2nd place, silver medalist(s)
Song Maodang	100 m butterfly S8	1:02.77	2 Q	1:01.99	3rd place, bronze medalist(s)
Wang Jiachao	100 m butterfly S8	1:03.94	4 Q	1:02.00	4
Du Jianping	150 m individual medley SM3	3:03.69	2 Q	2:43.72 WR	1st place, gold medalist(s)
Li Hanhua	150 m individual medley SM3	3:16.94	7 Q	3:01.16	3rd place, bronze medalist(s)
Xu Qing	200 m individual medley SM6	2:45.62	2 Q	2:38.62 WR	1st place, gold medalist(s)
Zheng Tao	200 m individual medley SM6	2:52.58	4 Q	2:44.38	3rd place, bronze medalist(s)
Liu Ce	200 m individual medley SM6	3:01.51	10	Did not advance	
Yang Huaqiang	200 m individual medley SM7	2:40.59 AS	4 Q	2:40.52 AS	4
Wang Jingang	200 m individual medley SM7	2:49.32	6 Q	2:42.13	6
Wang Jiachao	200 m individual medley SM8	2:29.49	4 Q	2:26.62	2nd place, silver medalist(s)
Yang Bozun	200 m individual medley SM11	2:23.43 AS	1 Q	2:22.40 WR	1st place, gold medalist(s)
Song Maodang; Wang Jiachao; Lin Furong; Wang Yinan	4 × 100 m freestyle relay 34pts	4:01.05	6 Q	3:51.68 AS	2nd place, silver medalist(s)
Liu Xiaobing; Liu Ruijin; Wang Jiachao*; Wei Yanpeng; Song Maodang*; Wang Yinan	4 × 100 m medley relay 34pts	4:25.46	4 Q	4:09.04 WR	1st place, gold medalist(s)

=== Women ===
Athletes	Event	Heat		Final	
Athletes	Event	Time	Rank	Time	Rank
Xia Jiangbo	50 m freestyle S3	52.73	2 Q	48.11 WR	1st place, gold medalist(s)
Jiang Shengnan	50 m freestyle S8	31.81	2 Q	31.55	3rd place, bronze medalist(s)
Chen Zhonglan	50 m freestyle S8	32.96	11	Did not advance	
Lin Ping	50 m freestyle S9	29.59 AS	3 Q	29.12 PR	1st place, gold medalist(s)
Li Guizhi	50 m freestyle S11	31.48	2 Q	31.01 AS	2nd place, silver medalist(s)
Xie Qing	50 m freestyle S11	33.74	7 Q	31.87	4
Xia Jiangbo	100 m freestyle S3	1:49.01 WR	2 Q	1:44.32 WR	1st place, gold medalist(s)
Song Lingling	100 m freestyle S6	1:18.46	4 Q	1:16.84 AS	4
Ke Liting	100 m freestyle S7	1:16.98 AS	6 Q	1:17.15	6
Jiang Shengnan	100 m freestyle S8	1:12.85 AS	9	Did not advance	
Lin Ping	100 m freestyle S9	1:05.55 AS	6 Q	1:04.27 AS	4
Li Guizhi	100 m freestyle S11	1:09.38	1 Q	1:10.25	3rd place, bronze medalist(s)
Xie Qing	100 m freestyle S11	1:14.01	6 Q	1:11.08	5
Song Lingling	400 m freestyle S6	5:44.68 AS	4 Q	5:33.73 AS	3rd place, bronze medalist(s)
Cai Yuqingyan	400 m freestyle S9	5:03.12	9	Did not advance	
Feng Yazhu	50 m backstroke S2	—N/a		1:03.00 WR	1st place, gold medalist(s)
Bai Juan	50 m backstroke S4	54.00 AS	2 Q	54.33	3rd place, bronze medalist(s)
Lu Dong	100 m backstroke S6	1:28.18 PR	2 Q	1:24.71 WR	1st place, gold medalist(s)
Jiang Fuying	100 m backstroke S6	1:32.22	6 Q	1:33.22	6
Zhang Ying	100 m backstroke S7	1:27.89 AS	7 Q	1:25.63 AS	4
Jin Xiaoqin	100 m backstroke S8	1:23.46	5 Q	1:22.99	5
Lu Weiyuan	100 m backstroke S8	1:24.31	7 Q	1:23.56	8
Guan Xiangnan	100 m backstroke S8	1:27.62	13	Did not advance	
Dun Longjuan	100 m backstroke S9	1:14.99 AS	6 Q	1:15.48	6
Lin Ping	100 m backstroke S9	1:19.32	9	Did not advance	
Wu Qi	100 m breaststroke SB4	2:10.31	8 Q	2:09.70	8
Song Lingling	100 m breaststroke SB5	1:49.19 AS	2 Q	1:47.19 AS	2nd place, silver medalist(s)
Ke Liting	100 m breaststroke SB6	DSQ		Did not advance	
Tan Xu	100 m breaststroke SB7	1:41.07	5 Q	1:39.67	5
Zhang Meng	100 m breaststroke SB9	1:22.48	6	1:23.11	8
Wu Qi	50 m butterfly S5	48.84	5 Q	47.51 AS	5
Lu Dong	50 m butterfly S6	38.28	2 Q	37.65 AS	2nd place, silver medalist(s)
Jiang Fuying	50 m butterfly S6	40.18	5 Q	39.26	3rd place, bronze medalist(s)
Huang Min	50 m butterfly S7	37.73	4 Q	36.50	3rd place, bronze medalist(s)
Tan Xu	50 m butterfly S7	39.61	7 Q	39.14	6
Yang Tianshu	50 m butterfly S7	40.85	10	Did not advance	
Jiang Shengnan	100 m butterfly S8	1:15.24	4 Q	1:13.28	3rd place, bronze medalist(s)
Chen Zhonglan	100 m butterfly S8	1:15.48	6 Q	1:14.53	4
Lu Weiyuan	100 m butterfly S8	1:15.15	3 Q	1:15.05	5
Cai Yuqingyan	100 m butterfly S9	1:15.79	10	Did not advance	
Wu Qi	200 m individual medley SM5	3:41.99 AS	4 Q	3:38.66 AS	4
Jiang Fuying	200 m individual medley SM6	3:20.39	4	3:19.18	5
Huang Min	200 m individual medley SM7	3:11.44	3 Q	3:07.51	3rd place, bronze medalist(s)
Tan Xu	200 m individual medley SM7	3:19.76	10	Did not advance	
Jiang Shengnan	200 m individual medley SM8	2:54.52	4 Q	2:49.47 AS	3rd place, bronze medalist(s)
Lu Weiyuan	200 m individual medley SM8	2:54.45	3 Q	2:52.66	4
Zhang Meng	200 m individual medley SM10	2:34.88 AS	3 Q	2:33.95 AS	3rd place, bronze medalist(s)
Xie Qing	200 m individual medley SM11	3:08.95	7 Q	3:00.46	5
Ke Liting; Jiang Shengnan; Lin Ping; Zhang Meng	4 × 100 m freestyle relay 34pts	—N/a		4:36.23 AS	5
Jin Xiaoqin; Zhang Meng; Jiang Shengnan; Lin Ping	4 × 100 m medley relay 34pts	—N/a		5:06.75 AS	6

== Table tennis ==
Men's individual

Athlete	Event	Group stage			Quarterfinals	Semifinals	Final	
Athlete	Event	Opposition Result	Opposition Result	Rank	Opposition Result	Opposition Result	Opposition Result	Rank
Gao Yanming	Individual C2	Espindola (BRA); W 3-1	Kim (KOR); L 0-3	2	Did not advance			
Feng Panfeng	Individual C3	Kim (KOR); W 3-0	Hadrava (CZE); W 3-0	1 Q	Piñas (ESP); W 3-0	Merrien (FRA); W 3-0	Kesler (SRB); W 3-0	1st place, gold medalist(s)
Zhao Ping	Individual C3	Jeyoung (KOR); W 3-1	Guertler (GER); W 3-1	1 Q	Kesler (SRB); L 2-3	Did not advance		
Guo Xingyuan	Individual C4	Babes (BRA); W 3-0	Kober (GER); W 3-0	1 Q	Saleh (EGY); L 0-3	Did not advance		
Zhang Yan	Individual C4	Bye			Choi (KOR); W 3-2	Thomas (FRA); W 3-1	Kim (KOR); L 1-3	2nd place, silver medalist(s)
Cao Ningning	Individual C5	Robertson (GBR); W 3-1	Taus (CZE); W 3-1	1 Q	—N/a	Rosec (FRA); W 3-1	Urhaug (NOR); L 1-3	2nd place, silver medalist(s)
Chen Chao	Individual C6	Itai (JPN); W 3-0	Fernandez (FRA); W 3-0	1 Q	Valera (ESP); L 0-3	Did not advance		
Liao Keli	Individual C7	Namsaga (THA); W 3-1	Bayley (GBR); L 0-3	2	Did not advance			
Sun Churen	Individual C8	McKibbin (GBR); W 3-0	Loicq (BEL); W 3-0	1 Q	Andersson (SWE); L 2-3	Did not advance		
Ye Chaoqun	Individual C8	Bye			Csejtey (SVK); L 1-3	Did not advance		
Zhao Shuai	Individual C8	Bye			Csonka (HUN); W 3-0	Wilson (GBR); W 3-2	Csejtey (SVK); W 3-1	1st place, gold medalist(s)
Ma Lin	Individual C9	Bye			Bellais (FRA); W 3-0	Cebastany (FRA); W 3-0	Fraczyk (AUT); W 3-1	1st place, gold medalist(s)
Ge Yang	Individual C10	Bye			Csejtey (CZE); W 3-2	Jacobs (INA); W 3-1	Chojnowski (POL); L 0-3	2nd place, silver medalist(s)
Lian Hao	Individual C10	Carbinatti (BRA); W 3-2	Daybell (GBR); W 3-2	1 Q	Chojnowski (POL); L 0-3	Did not advance		
Lu Xiaolei	Individual C10	Bakar (MAS); W 3-1	Lukyanov (RUS); L 2-3	1 Q	Jacobs (INA); L 1-3	Did not advance		

Men's team

Athlete	Event	Round of 16	Quarterfinals	Semifinals	Final	
Athlete	Event	Opposition Result	Opposition Result	Opposition Result	Opposition Result	Rank
Gao Yanming; Feng Panfeng; Zhao Ping	Team C3	—N/a	Bye	South Korea (KOR); W 3-0	Germany (GER); W 3-2	1st place, gold medalist(s)
Guo Xingyuan; ZhangYan; Cao Ningning	Team C4-5	Bye	Germany (GER); W 3-0	France (FRA); W 3-2	South Korea (KOR); W 3-1	1st place, gold medalist(s)
Liao Keli; Sun Churen; Ye Chaoqun; Zhao Shuai	Team C6-8	Bye	Spain (ESP); L 1-3	Did not advance		
Ma Lin; Ge Yang; Lian Hao; Lu Xiaolei	Team C9-10	Bye	Netherlands (NED); W 3-0	Ukraine (UKR); W 3-0	Poland (POL); W 3-2	1st place, gold medalist(s)

Women's individual

Athlete	Event	Group stage				Quarterfinals	Semifinals	Final	
Athlete	Event	Opposition Result	Opposition Result	Opposition Result	Rank	Opposition Result	Opposition Result	Opposition Result	Rank
Liu Jing	Individual C1-2	Profitt (USA); W 3-0	Podda (ITA); W 3-1	—N/a	1 Q	—N/a	Lafaye (FRA); W 3-1	Pezzutto (ITA); W 3-0	1st place, gold medalist(s)
Li Qian	Individual C3	Bye				Mader (AUT); L 2-3	Did not advance		
Zhang Miao	Individual C4	Oliveira (BRA); W 3-0	Matic (SRB); W 3-0	—N/a	1 Q	—N/a	Peric-Rankovic (SRB); L 2-3	Moon (KOR); L 2-3	4
Zhou Ying	Individual C4	Zorzetto (ITA); W 3-0	Dolinar (KOR); W 3-0	—N/a	1 Q	—N/a	Moon (KOR); W 3-0	Peric-Rankovic (SRB); W 3-0	1st place, gold medalist(s)
Gu Gai	Individual C5	Nardelli (ITA); W 3-0	Wei (TPE); W 3-0	—N/a	1 Q	—N/a	Abuawad (JOR); W 3-1	Zhang (CHN); L 1-3	2nd place, silver medalist(s)
Zhang Bian	Individual C5	Passos (BRA); W 3-0	Jung (KOR); W 3-2	—N/a	1 Q	—N/a	Lundback (SWE); W 3-0	Gu (CHN); W 3-1	1st place, gold medalist(s)
Mao Jingdian	Individual C8	Medina (PHI); W 3-0	Dahlen (NOR); W 3-0	Rodrigues (BRA); W 3-0	1 Q	—N/a	Abrahamsson (SWE); W 3-0	Kamkasomphou (FRA); W 3-1	1st place, gold medalist(s)
Yu Hailian	Individual C8	Mahmoud (EGY); W 3-0	Kamkasomphou (FRA); L 1-3	Abrahamsson (SWE); L 2-3	3	—N/a	Did not advance		
Lei Lina	Individual C9	Liu (CHN); W 3-0	Kavas (TUR); W 3-0	Pek (POL); W 3-0	1 Q	—N/a	Mairie (FRA); W 3-0	Kavas (TUR); W 3-2	1st place, gold medalist(s)
Liu Meili	Individual C9	Jankowska (POL); W 3-0	Gorshkaleva (RUS); L 0-3	Mairie (FRA); W 3-0	1 Q	—N/a	Kavas (TUR); L 2-3	Mairie (FRA); W 3-1	3rd place, bronze medalist(s)
Liu Meng	Individual C9	Lei (CHN); L 0-3	Pek (POL); W 3-2	Kavas (TUR); L 0-3	3	—N/a	Did not advance		
Fan Lei	Individual C10	Alexandre (BRA); W 3-2	Tapper (AUS); W 3-0	Le Morvan (FRA); W 3-0	1 Q	—N/a	Yang (CHN); L 1-3	Tapper (AUS); W 3-2	3rd place, bronze medalist(s)
Yang Qian	Individual C10	Maghraby (EGY); W 3-0	Partyka (POL); L 0-3	Ertis (TUR); W 3-0	2 Q	—N/a	Fan (CHN); W 3-1	Partyka (POL); L 2-3	2nd place, silver medalist(s)

Women's team

Athlete	Event	Round of 16	Quarterfinals	Semifinals	Final	
Athlete	Event	Opposition Result	Opposition Result	Opposition Result	Opposition Result	Rank
Liu Jing; Li Qian	Team C1-3	—N/a	France (FRA); W 3-0	Italy (ITA); W 3-0	South Korea (KOR); W 3-0	1st place, gold medalist(s)
Zhang Miao; Zhou Ying; Gu Gai; Zhang Bian	Team C4-5	Bye	Italy (ITA); W 3-0	Serbia (SRB); W 3-0	Sweden (SWE); W 3-0	1st place, gold medalist(s)
Lei Lina; Liu Meili; Fan Lei; Yang Qian	Team C6-10	Bye	Ukraine (UKR); W 3-0	France (FRA); W 3-0	Turkey (TUR); W 3-0	1st place, gold medalist(s)

== Volleyball ==
=== Men's tournament ===
Roster

The following is the Chinese roster in the men's volleyball tournament of the 2012 Summer Paralympics.

Head coach: Liu Fangqing

№	Name	Date of birth	Position	2012 club
1	Tong Jiao	18 August 1974	WS	(China) Shanghai Volleyball Team
2	Shan Sunkui	12 January 1990	L	(China) Zhejiang Volleyball Team
3	Jin Heng	4 February 1982	OS	(China) Jiangsu Volleyball Team
5	Gao Hui	7 September 1987	OS	(China) Yunnan Volleyball Team
6	Wang Shuo	11 December 1987	OS	(China) Yunnan Volleyball Team
8	Zhou Canming	3 March 1982	OS	(China) Zhejiang Volleyball Team
9	Wang Haidong	30 January 1980	OS	(China) Shanghai Volleyball Team
10	Zhao Peiwen	20 January 1982	OS	(China) Zhejiang Volleyball Team
11	Zhang Zhongmin	25 August 1978	OS	(China) Liaoning Volleyball Team
12	Li Lei	23 March 1991	OS	(China) Shanghai Volleyball Team
13	Ding Xiaochao	13 July 1987	WS	(China) Shanghai Volleyball Team

Group B

Pos	Team	Pld	W	L	Pts	SW	SL	SR	SPW	SPL	SPR
1	Iran	4	4	0	8	12	1	12.000	322	207	1.556
2	Bosnia and Herzegovina	4	3	1	7	10	3	3.333	309	240	1.288
3	Brazil	4	2	2	6	6	6	1.000	257	230	1.117
4	China	4	1	3	5	3	9	0.333	243	266	0.914
5	Rwanda	4	0	4	4	0	12	0.000	115	300	0.383

30 August 2012; 16:00	Bosnia and Herzegovina	3–0	China	ExCeL London, London; Referees: Toomas Murulo (EST), Mourad El-Baroudy (EGY)
30 August 2012; 16:00	(26–24, 25–21, 25–17); Report			ExCeL London, London; Referees: Toomas Murulo (EST), Mourad El-Baroudy (EGY)

1 September 2012; 14:00	Iran	3–0	China	ExCeL London, London; Referees: Dimosthenis Kostopoulos (GRE), Amin Al-Traifi (KSA)
1 September 2012; 14:00	(25–15, 25–19, 25–12); Report			ExCeL London, London; Referees: Dimosthenis Kostopoulos (GRE), Amin Al-Traifi (KSA)

2 September 2012; 9:00	China	3–0	Rwanda	ExCeL London, London; Referees: Dee Wauchope (GBR), Ute Fischer (GER)
2 September 2012; 9:00	(25–10, 25–13, 25–17); Report			ExCeL London, London; Referees: Dee Wauchope (GBR), Ute Fischer (GER)

4 September 2012; 11:00	Brazil	3–0	China	ExCeL London, London; Referees: Report
4 September 2012; 11:00	(25–17, 25–23, 25–20); Sari Mannersuo (FIN), Anton Probst (GER)			ExCeL London, London; Referees: Report

Quarter-final

5 September 2012; 9:00	Germany	3–2	China	ExCeL London, London; Referees: Adnan Kolos (BIH), France Marcoux (CAN)
5 September 2012; 9:00	(19–25, 21–25, 25–21, 25–19, 15–10); Report			ExCeL London, London; Referees: Adnan Kolos (BIH), France Marcoux (CAN)

5th–8th place semi-final

6 September 2012; 14:00	China	2–3	Egypt	ExCeL London, London; Referees: Dominik Raca (CRO), Sari Mannersuo (FIN)
6 September 2012; 14:00	(25–16, 23–25, 23–25, 25–17, 11–15); Report			ExCeL London, London; Referees: Dominik Raca (CRO), Sari Mannersuo (FIN)

7th/8th place match

7 September 2012; 16:00	China	3–0	Great Britain	ExCeL London, London; Referees: Toomas Murulo (EST)
7 September 2012; 16:00	(25–14, 25–16, 25–22); Report			ExCeL London, London; Referees: Toomas Murulo (EST)

=== Women's tournament ===
Roster

The following is the Chinese roster in the women's volleyball tournament of the 2012 Summer Paralympics.

№	Name	Date of birth	Position	2012 club
1	Tang Xue Mei	4 February 1994		(China) Shanghai
2	Lu Hong Qin	4 October 1980		(China) Shanghai
3	Tan Yanhua	10 October 1987		(China) Jiangsu
5	Su Li Mei	16 October 1988		(China) Yunnan
6	Zheng Xiong Ying	1 May 1975		(China) Zhejiang
7	Wang Yanan	8 September 1991		(China) Shanghai
8	Li Liping	3 July 1982		(China) Shanghai
9	Zhang Xu Fei	28 August 1984		(China) Shanghai
10	Yang Yan Ling	2 November 1980		(China) Gansu
11	Zhang Lijun	31 August 1985		(China) Liaoning
12	Zheng Yu Hong	21 March 1971		(China) Jiangsu

Group B

Pos	Team	Pld	W	L	Pts	SW	SL	SR	SPW	SPL	SPR
1	China	3	3	0	6	9	2	4.500	275	138	1.993
2	United States	3	2	1	5	7	2	3.500	245	187	1.310
3	Brazil	3	1	2	4	4	8	0.500	242	273	0.886
4	Slovenia	3	0	3	3	2	9	0.222	176	260	0.677

31 August 2012; 16:00	China	3–1	United States	ExCeL London, London; Referees: Ute Fischer (GER), Khalid Shanishah (LBA)
31 August 2012; 16:00	(22–25, 32–30, 25–23, 25–17); Report			ExCeL London, London; Referees: Ute Fischer (GER), Khalid Shanishah (LBA)

1 September 2012; 9:00	China	3–1	Brazil	ExCeL London, London; Referees: Benno Meijer (NED), Adnan Kolas (BIH)
1 September 2012; 9:00	(26–24, 25–15, 20–25, 25–16); Report			ExCeL London, London; Referees: Benno Meijer (NED), Adnan Kolas (BIH)

3 September 2012; 9:00	China	3–0	Slovenia	ExCeL London, London; Referees: Ute Fischer (GER), Adnan Kolos (BIH)
3 September 2012; 9:00	(25–12, 25–15, 25–16); Report			ExCeL London, London; Referees: Ute Fischer (GER), Adnan Kolos (BIH)

Semi-final

5 September 2012; 19:00	Netherlands	2–3	China	ExCeL London, London; Referees: Glynn Archibald (GBR), Sari Mannersuo (FIN)
5 September 2012; 19:00	(25–17, 14–25, 25–13, 16–25, 11–15); Report			ExCeL London, London; Referees: Glynn Archibald (GBR), Sari Mannersuo (FIN)

Gold medal match

September 7, 2012; 21:00	United States	1–3	China	ExCeL London, London; Referees: Janko Plesnik (SLO), Ute Fischer (GER)
September 7, 2012; 21:00	(25–22, 15–25, 30–32, 15–25); Report			ExCeL London, London; Referees: Janko Plesnik (SLO), Ute Fischer (GER)

== Wheelchair basketball ==
=== Women's tournament ===
Roster

- Qiurong Chen
- Haizhen Cheng
- Mingzhu Deng
- Yongqing Fu
- Yanhua Li
- Yuhui Li
- Man Liu
- Yun Long
- Fengling Peng
- Xiaoyan Wang
- San Yang
- Yanli Zhang

Group B

Team	Pld	W	L	PF	PA	PD	Pts	Qualification
Germany	4	4	0	254	158	+96	8	Quarter-finals
United States	4	3	1	246	176	+70	7	Quarter-finals
China	4	2	2	240	204	+36	6	Quarter-finals
Mexico	4	1	3	157	230	−73	5	Quarter-finals
France	4	0	4	132	261	−129	4	Eliminated

30 August 2012
21:15

Report

Mexico	46–53	China
Scoring by quarter: 21–11, 9–11, 11–13, 5–18
Pts: Estrada Bernal 18; Rebs: Estrada Bernal 14; Asts: Estrada Bernal 4		Pts: Cheng 19; Rebs: Cheng 13; Asts: Zhang 3

North Greenwich Arena, London
Referees: Ian Pursglove (GBR)

31 August 2012
20:45

Report

China	72–34	France
Scoring by quarter: 21–6, 20–8, 13–12, 18–8
Pts: Cheng 20; Rebs: Cheng 10; Asts: Long 6		Pts: Saint-Omer-Delépine 13; Rebs: Saint-Omer-Delépine 6 Asts: Glemp-Etavard 4

Basketball Arena, London
Referees: Darrell Hargreaves (USA)

2 September 2012
10:45

Report

Germany	56–50	China
Scoring by quarter: 13–17, 17–7, 20–11, 6–15
Pts: Schünemann 23; Rebs: Schünemann 12; Asts: Schünemann 6		Pts: Long 16; Rebs: Cheng 7 Asts: Long, Peng 4

Basketball Arena, London
Referees: Linas Radykas (LTU)

3 September 2012
13:00

Report

China	65–68 (OT)	United States
Scoring by quarter: 17–11, 11–12, 18–12, 15–26, Overtime: 4–7
Pts: Cheng 22; Rebs: Fu 13; Asts: Long 5		Pts: Murray 30; Rebs: Murray 14; Asts: Murray 8

Basketball Arena, London
Referees: Cristian Roja (ITA)

Quarter-final

4 September 2012
15:15

Report

Netherlands	59–37	China
Scoring by quarter: 13–6, 8–13, 18–10, 20–8
Pts: Beijer 29; Rebs: Beijer 14; Asts: Huitzing 9		Pts: Fu 18; Rebs: Long 6 Asts: Fu 12

North Greenwich Arena, London
Referees: Mati Quintana (ARG)

5th–8th place semi-final

6 September 2012
10:45

Report

China	72–55	Great Britain
Scoring by quarter: 17–10, 17–10, 15–11, 23–24
Pts: Cheng 19; Rebs: Cheng 14; Asts: Long 10		Pts: Freeman 22; Rebs: Freeman 9 Asts: Freeman 9

North Greenwich Arena, London
Referees: Matt Wells (AUS)

5th/6th place match

7 September 2012
10:45

Report

Canada	70–73	China
Scoring by quarter: 17–15, 12–14, 13–18, 28–26
Pts: McLachlan 22; Rebs: McLachlan 17; Asts: Harnock 7		Pts: Fu 25; Rebs: Cheng 10; Asts: Long 9

North Greenwich Arena, London
Referees: Max Kindervater (GER)

== Wheelchair fencing ==
Men

Athlete	Event	Group stage			Round of 16	Quarterfinals	Semifinals	Final	
Athlete	Event	Opposition	Result	Rank	Opposition Result	Opposition Result	Opposition Result	Opposition Result	Rank
Chen Yijen	Individual foil A	A Yusupov (RUS)	W 5-2	1 Q	—N/a	Pender (POL); W 15-12	Osvath (HUN); W 15-13	Ye R (CHN); L 5-15	2nd place, silver medalist(s)
Chen Yijen	Individual foil A	Pender (POL)	W 5-2	1 Q	—N/a	Pender (POL); W 15-12	Osvath (HUN); W 15-13	Ye R (CHN); L 5-15	2nd place, silver medalist(s)
Chen Yijen	Individual foil A	Mato (HUN)	W 5-1	1 Q	—N/a	Pender (POL); W 15-12	Osvath (HUN); W 15-13	Ye R (CHN); L 5-15	2nd place, silver medalist(s)
Chen Yijen	Individual foil A	Betti (ITA)	W 5-0	1 Q	—N/a	Pender (POL); W 15-12	Osvath (HUN); W 15-13	Ye R (CHN); L 5-15	2nd place, silver medalist(s)
Chen Yijen	Individual sabre A	Chan W K (HKG)	L 3-5	2 Q	—N/a	Frolov (RUS); W 15-6	Stanczuk (POL); W 15-8	Tian (CHN); W 15-12	1st place, gold medalist(s)
Chen Yijen	Individual sabre A	Fayzullin (RUS)	W 5-2	2 Q	—N/a	Frolov (RUS); W 15-6	Stanczuk (POL); W 15-8	Tian (CHN); W 15-12	1st place, gold medalist(s)
Chen Yijen	Individual sabre A	Makowski (POL)	W 5-1	2 Q	—N/a	Frolov (RUS); W 15-6	Stanczuk (POL); W 15-8	Tian (CHN); W 15-12	1st place, gold medalist(s)
Chen Yijen	Individual sabre A	Alexakis (GRE)	W 5-0	2 Q	—N/a	Frolov (RUS); W 15-6	Stanczuk (POL); W 15-8	Tian (CHN); W 15-12	1st place, gold medalist(s)
Duan Yanfei	Individual épée A	Mató (HUN)	W 5-1	2 Q	Noble (FRA) (7); L 11-15	Did not advance			
Duan Yanfei	Individual épée A	Stańczuk (POL)	W 5-0	2 Q	Noble (FRA) (7); L 11-15	Did not advance			
Duan Yanfei	Individual épée A	Noble (FRA)	L 4-5	2 Q	Noble (FRA) (7); L 11-15	Did not advance			
Duan Yanfei	Individual épée A	Kavalenia (BLR)	W 5-1	2 Q	Noble (FRA) (7); L 11-15	Did not advance			
Tian Jianquan	Individual épée A	Citerne (FRA)	W 5-0	1 Q	Pender (POL) (9); L 8-15	Did not advance			
Tian Jianquan	Individual épée A	Wong (HKG)	W 5-2	1 Q	Pender (POL) (9); L 8-15	Did not advance			
Tian Jianquan	Individual épée A	Pender (POL)	W 5-2	1 Q	Pender (POL) (9); L 8-15	Did not advance			
Tian Jianquan	Individual épée A	Tsedryk (UKR)	W 5-2	1 Q	Pender (POL) (9); L 8-15	Did not advance			
Tian Jianquan	Individual sabre A	Cheong M C (HKG)	W 5-1	1 Q	—N/a	El Assine (FRA); W 15-6	Chan W K (HKG); W 15-4	Chen Y (CHN); L 12-15	2nd place, silver medalist(s)
Tian Jianquan	Individual sabre A	Noble (FRA)	W 5-3	1 Q	—N/a	El Assine (FRA); W 15-6	Chan W K (HKG); W 15-4	Chen Y (CHN); L 12-15	2nd place, silver medalist(s)
Tian Jianquan	Individual sabre A	Hall Butcher (GBR)	W 5-2	1 Q	—N/a	El Assine (FRA); W 15-6	Chan W K (HKG); W 15-4	Chen Y (CHN); L 12-15	2nd place, silver medalist(s)
Tian Jianquan	Individual sabre A	Tsedryk (UKR)	W 5-2	1 Q	—N/a	El Assine (FRA); W 15-6	Chan W K (HKG); W 15-4	Chen Y (CHN); L 12-15	2nd place, silver medalist(s)
Hu Daoliang	Individual épée B	Cratère (FRA)	L 3-5	2 Q	—N/a	Tam (HKG); L 9-15	Did not advance		
Hu Daoliang	Individual épée B	Kuzyukov (RUS)	W 5-3	2 Q	—N/a	Tam (HKG); L 9-15	Did not advance		
Hu Daoliang	Individual épée B	Lemiashkevich (BLR)	W 5-4	2 Q	—N/a	Tam (HKG); L 9-15	Did not advance		
Hu Daoliang	Individual épée B	Chung T C (HKG)	W 2-0	2 Q	—N/a	Tam (HKG); L 9-15	Did not advance		
Hu Daoliang	Individual foil B	Latreche (FRA)	L 0-5	2 Q	—N/a	M Yusupov (RUS); W 15-13	Latreche (FRA); W 15-9	Datsko (UKR); W 15-10	1st place, gold medalist(s)
Hu Daoliang	Individual foil B	Szekeres (HUN)	W 5-3	2 Q	—N/a	M Yusupov (RUS); W 15-13	Latreche (FRA); W 15-9	Datsko (UKR); W 15-10	1st place, gold medalist(s)
Hu Daoliang	Individual foil B	Khamatshin (RUS)	W 5-1	2 Q	—N/a	M Yusupov (RUS); W 15-13	Latreche (FRA); W 15-9	Datsko (UKR); W 15-10	1st place, gold medalist(s)
Hu Daoliang	Individual foil B	Moreno (USA)	W 5-2	2 Q	—N/a	M Yusupov (RUS); W 15-13	Latreche (FRA); W 15-9	Datsko (UKR); W 15-10	1st place, gold medalist(s)
Ye Ruyi	Individual foil A	Demchuk (UKR)	W 5-4	2 Q	—N/a	Andreev (RUS); W 15-6	Tokatlian (FRA); W 15-8	Chen Y (CHN); W 15-5	1st place, gold medalist(s)
Ye Ruyi	Individual foil A	Tokatlian (FRA)	L 4-5	2 Q	—N/a	Andreev (RUS); W 15-6	Tokatlian (FRA); W 15-8	Chen Y (CHN); W 15-5	1st place, gold medalist(s)
Ye Ruyi	Individual foil A	Makowski (POL)	W 5-3	2 Q	—N/a	Andreev (RUS); W 15-6	Tokatlian (FRA); W 15-8	Chen Y (CHN); W 15-5	1st place, gold medalist(s)
Ye Ruyi	Individual foil A	Alhaddad (KUW)	W 5-1	2 Q	—N/a	Andreev (RUS); W 15-6	Tokatlian (FRA); W 15-8	Chen Y (CHN); W 15-5	1st place, gold medalist(s)
Ye Ruyi	Individual foil A	Wong T T (HKG)	L 5-0	2 Q	—N/a	Andreev (RUS); W 15-6	Tokatlian (FRA); W 15-8	Chen Y (CHN); W 15-5	1st place, gold medalist(s)
Hu Daoliang; Ye Ruyi; Chen Yijun	Team open	—N/a				Hungary (HUN); W 45-29	Italy (ITA); W 45-19	France (FRA); W 45-32	1st place, gold medalist(s)

Women

Athlete	Event	Group Stage			Quarterfinals	Semifinals	Final	
Athlete	Event	Opposition	Result	Rank	Opposition Result	Opposition Result	Opposition Result	Rank
Rong Jing	Individual foil A	Bernard (FRA)	L 4-5	2 Q	Krajnyak (HUN); L 14-15	Did not advance		
Rong Jing	Individual foil A	Krajnyak (HUN)	W 5-4	2 Q	Krajnyak (HUN); L 14-15	Did not advance		
Rong Jing	Individual foil A	Lao (MAC)	W 5-3	2 Q	Krajnyak (HUN); L 14-15	Did not advance		
Rong Jing	Individual foil A	Fan P S (HKG)	W 5-3	2 Q	Krajnyak (HUN); L 14-15	Did not advance		
Rong Jing	Individual foil A	Trigilia (ITA)	W 5-4	2 Q	Krajnyak (HUN); L 14-15	Did not advance		
Wu Baili	Individual épée A	Gorlina (UKR)	W 5-1	1 Q	Juhasz (HUN); W 15-6	Yu C Y (HKG); L 11-15	Gorlina (UKR); W 15-11	3rd place, bronze medalist(s)
Wu Baili	Individual épée A	Fidrych (POL)	L 2-5	1 Q	Juhasz (HUN); W 15-6	Yu C Y (HKG); L 11-15	Gorlina (UKR); W 15-11	3rd place, bronze medalist(s)
Wu Baili	Individual épée A	Krajnyak (HUN)	L 4-5	1 Q	Juhasz (HUN); W 15-6	Yu C Y (HKG); L 11-15	Gorlina (UKR); W 15-11	3rd place, bronze medalist(s)
Wu Baili	Individual épée A	Lao (MAC)	W 5-3	1 Q	Juhasz (HUN); W 15-6	Yu C Y (HKG); L 11-15	Gorlina (UKR); W 15-11	3rd place, bronze medalist(s)
Wu Baili	Individual épée A	Fan P S (HKG)	W 5-0	1 Q	Juhasz (HUN); W 15-6	Yu C Y (HKG); L 11-15	Gorlina (UKR); W 15-11	3rd place, bronze medalist(s)
Wu Baili	Individual foil A	Yu C Y (HKG)	L 1-5	2 Q	Sycheva (RUS); W 15-10	Juhasz (HUN); W 15-5	Yu C Y (HKG); L 13-15	2nd place, silver medalist(s)
Wu Baili	Individual foil A	Sycheva (RUS)	W 5-4	2 Q	Sycheva (RUS); W 15-10	Juhasz (HUN); W 15-5	Yu C Y (HKG); L 13-15	2nd place, silver medalist(s)
Wu Baili	Individual foil A	Poignet (FRA)	W 5-0	2 Q	Sycheva (RUS); W 15-10	Juhasz (HUN); W 15-5	Yu C Y (HKG); L 13-15	2nd place, silver medalist(s)
Wu Baili	Individual foil A	Juhasz (HUN)	W 5-3	2 Q	Sycheva (RUS); W 15-10	Juhasz (HUN); W 15-5	Yu C Y (HKG); L 13-15	2nd place, silver medalist(s)
Wu Baili	Individual foil A	Bouwkamp (USA)	W 5-1	2 Q	Sycheva (RUS); W 15-10	Juhasz (HUN); W 15-5	Yu C Y (HKG); L 13-15	2nd place, silver medalist(s)
Yao Fang	Individual foil B	Chan Y C (HKG)	L 3-5	4 Q	Chan Y C (HKG); W 15-13	Makowska (POL); W 15-10	Dani (HUN); W 15-10	1st place, gold medalist(s)
Yao Fang	Individual foil B	Dani (HUN)	W 5-3	4 Q	Chan Y C (HKG); W 15-13	Makowska (POL); W 15-10	Dani (HUN); W 15-10	1st place, gold medalist(s)
Yao Fang	Individual foil B	Makowska (POL)	L 3-5	4 Q	Chan Y C (HKG); W 15-13	Makowska (POL); W 15-10	Dani (HUN); W 15-10	1st place, gold medalist(s)
Yao Fang	Individual foil B	Vasileva (RUS)	L 4-5	4 Q	Chan Y C (HKG); W 15-13	Makowska (POL); W 15-10	Dani (HUN); W 15-10	1st place, gold medalist(s)
Zhou Jingjing	Individual foil B	Briese-Baetke (GER)	W 5-3	1 Q	Vasileva (RUS); W 15-11	Dani (HUN); L 13-15	Makowska (POL); L 14-15	4
Zhou Jingjing	Individual foil B	Mishurova (RUS)	W 5-0	1 Q	Vasileva (RUS); W 15-11	Dani (HUN); L 13-15	Makowska (POL); L 14-15	4
Zhou Jingjing	Individual foil B	Palfi (HUN)	W 5-2	1 Q	Vasileva (RUS); W 15-11	Dani (HUN); L 13-15	Makowska (POL); L 14-15	4
Zhou Jingjing	Individual foil B	Moore (GBR)	W 5-2	1 Q	Vasileva (RUS); W 15-11	Dani (HUN); L 13-15	Makowska (POL); L 14-15	4
Zhou Jingjing	Individual foil B	Lukianenko (UKR)	W 5-1	1 Q	Vasileva (RUS); W 15-11	Dani (HUN); L 13-15	Makowska (POL); L 14-15	4
Rong Jing; Wu Baili; Yao Fang	Team open	—N/a			Russia (RUS); W 45-38	Hong Kong (HKG); W 45-42	Hungary (HUN); W 45-38	1st place, gold medalist(s)

== See also ==
- 2012 Summer Paralympics
- China at the Paralympics
- China at the 2012 Summer Olympics
