= Athletics at the 2012 Summer Paralympics – Women's 200 metres T38 =

Women's 200 metres T38 at the XIV Paralympic Games
- Venue: London Olympic Stadium
- Dates: 6 September
- Competitors: 11 from 9 nations
- Winning time: 27.39

Medalists
1st place, gold medalist(s)		Chen Junfei	China
2nd place, silver medalist(s)		Margarita Goncharova	Russia
3rd place, bronze medalist(s)		Inna Stryzhak	Ukraine

Athletics at the 2012 Summer Paralympics
Classification
T/F11–13: Blind and visually impaired
T/F20: Intellectual disability
T/F31–38: Cerebral palsy
F40: Les Autres
T/F42–46: Amputees
T/F51–58: Spinal cord disability
Men T/F31–38
Track
100 m	T34	T35	T36
T37	T38
200 m	T34	T35	T36
T37	T38
400 m	T36	T38
800 m	T36	T37
1500 m	T37
Field
Long jump	F36	F37-38
Shot put	F32-33	F34
F37-38
Club throw	F31-32/51
Discus throw	F32-34	F35-36
F37-38
Javelin throw	F33-34
Women T/F31–38
Track
100 m	T34	T35	T36
T37	T38
200 m	T34	T35	T36
T37	T38
400 m	T37
4×100 m relay	T35-38
Field
Long jump	F37-38
Shot put	F32-34	F35-36
F37
Club throw	F31-32/51
Discus throw	F35-36	F37
Javelin throw	F33-34/52-53	F37-38

The Women's 200 metres T38 event at the 2012 Summer Paralympics took place at the London Olympic Stadium on 6 September. The event consisted of 2 heats and a final.

The T38 category is for ambulant athletes with cerebral palsy. T38 athletes have the mildest form of impairment caused by cerebral palsy, often in only one limb, and not affecting the ability to run, walk or jump freely, although impairing performance. T38 athletes may suffer minor co-ordination difficulties.

== Records ==
Prior to the competition, the existing World and Paralympic records were as follows:

World & Paralympic record	Inna Dyachenko (UKR)	27.81	12 September 2008	Beijing, China
Broken records during the 2012 Summer Paralympics
World record	Chen Junfei (CHN)	27.39	6 September 2012	

== Results ==
=== Round 1 ===
Competed 6 September 2012 from 10:17. Qual. rule: first 3 in each heat (Q) plus the 2 fastest other times (q) qualified.

==== Heat 1 ====
Rank	Athlete	Country	Time	Notes
1	Inna Stryzhak	Ukraine	28.91	Q
2	Margarita Goncharova	Russia	29.06	Q
3	Xiong Dezhi	China	29.10	Q
4	Torita Isaac	Australia	29.36	q
5	Olivia Breen	Great Britain	29.75	q
6	Jenifer Santos	Brazil	32.03	
			Wind: +0.5 m/s	

==== Heat 2 ====
Rank	Athlete	Country	Time	Notes
1	Chen Junfei	China	28.29	Q
2	Tamira Slaby	Germany	28.63	Q, PB
3	Sonia Mansour	Tunisia	29.10	Q, SB
4	Katie Parrish	Australia	30.94	
5	Norsyazwani Binti Abdullah	Malaysia	31.83	
			Wind: +0.2 m/s	

=== Final ===
Competed 6 September 2012 at 19:52.

Rank	Athlete	Country	Time	Notes
1st place, gold medalist(s)	Chen Junfei	China	27.39	WR
2nd place, silver medalist(s)	Margarita Goncharova	Russia	27.82	PB
3rd place, bronze medalist(s)	Inna Stryzhak	Ukraine	28.18	PB
4	Xiong Dezhi	China	28.62	PB
5	Tamira Slaby	Germany	29.14	
6	Sonia Mansour	Tunisia	29.32	
7	Torita Isaac	Australia	29.78	
8	Olivia Breen	Great Britain	30.22	
			Wind: -0.7 m/s	

Q = qualified by place. q = qualified by time. WR = World Record. PB = Personal Best. SB = Seasonal Best.
