= Athletics at the 2012 Summer Paralympics – Men's 200 metres T35 =

Men's 200 metres T35 at the XIV Paralympic Games
- Venue: London Olympic Stadium
- Dates: 5 and 6 September
- Competitors: 11 from 9 nations
- Winning time: 25.86

Medalists
1st place, gold medalist(s)		Iurii Tsaruk	Ukraine
2nd place, silver medalist(s)		Fu Xinhan	China
3rd place, bronze medalist(s)		Hernan Barreto	Argentina

Athletics at the 2012 Summer Paralympics
Classification
T/F11–13: Blind and visually impaired
T/F20: Intellectual disability
T/F31–38: Cerebral palsy
F40: Les Autres
T/F42–46: Amputees
T/F51–58: Spinal cord disability
Men T/F31–38
Track
100 m	T34	T35	T36
T37	T38
200 m	T34	T35	T36
T37	T38
400 m	T36	T38
800 m	T36	T37
1500 m	T37
Field
Long jump	F36	F37-38
Shot put	F32-33	F34
F37-38
Club throw	F31-32/51
Discus throw	F32-34	F35-36
F37-38
Javelin throw	F33-34
Women T/F31–38
Track
100 m	T34	T35	T36
T37	T38
200 m	T34	T35	T36
T37	T38
400 m	T37
4×100 m relay	T35-38
Field
Long jump	F37-38
Shot put	F32-34	F35-36
F37
Club throw	F31-32/51
Discus throw	F35-36	F37
Javelin throw	F33-34/52-53	F37-38

The Men's 200 metres T35 event at the 2012 Summer Paralympics took place at the London Olympic Stadium on 5 and 6 September.

The T35 category is for ambulant athletes with cerebral palsy. The typical T35 athlete may need assistive devices for walking. The athlete may have sufficient function to run but demonstrates poor balance.

== Records ==
Prior to the competition, the existing World and Paralympic records were as follows:

World record	Lloyd Upsdell (GBR)	26.69	26 July 2002	Villeneuve d'Ascq, France
Paralympic record	Teboho Mokgalagadi (RSA)	26.80	26 September 2004	Athens, Greece
Broken records during the 2012 Summer Paralympics
World record	Iurii Tsaruk (UKR)	26.58	5 September 2012	
World record	Iurii Tsaruk (UKR)	25.86	6 September 2012	

== Results ==
=== Round 1 ===
Competed 5 September 2012 from 22:27. Qual. rule: first 3 in each heat (Q) plus the 2 fastest other times (q) qualified.

==== Heat 1 ====
Rank	Athlete	Country	Time	Notes
1	Hernan Barreto	Argentina	27.19	Q, RR
2	Teboho Mokgalagadi	South Africa	27.37	Q, PB
3	Ivan Otleykin	Russia	28.16	Q, SB
4	Sam Ruddock	Great Britain	28.75	PB
5	Pedro Marquez Villanueva, Jr	Mexico	31.51	
			Wind: +0.4 m/s	

==== Heat 2 ====
Rank	Athlete	Country	Time	Notes
1	Iurii Tsaruk	Ukraine	26.58	Q, WR
2	Allel Boukhalfa	Algeria	27.39	Q
3	Fu Xinhan	China	27.42	Q, SB
4	Niels Stein	Germany	28.27	q, PB
5	Anton Bubnov	Russia	28.40	q, PB
6	Jordan Howe	Great Britain	DNS	
			Wind: -0.3 m/s	

=== Final ===
Competed 6 September 2012 at 20:40.

Rank	Athlete	Country	Time	Notes
1st place, gold medalist(s)	Iurii Tsaruk	Ukraine	25.86	WR
2nd place, silver medalist(s)	Fu Xinhan	China	26.21	RR
3rd place, bronze medalist(s)	Hernan Barreto	Argentina	26.59	RR
4	Allel Boukhalfa	Algeria	26.70	RR
5	Teboho Mokgalagadi	South Africa	27.02	PB
6	Ivan Otleykin	Russia	27.82	PB
7	Niels Stein	Germany	27.89	PB
8	Anton Bubnov	Russia	28.21	PB
			Wind: -0.2 m/s	

Q = qualified by place. q = qualified by time. WR = World Record. RR = Regional Record. PB = Personal Best. SB = Seasonal Best. DNS = Did not start.
