= Athletics at the 2012 Summer Paralympics – Men's 100 metres T35 =

Men's 100 metres T35 at the XIV Paralympic Games
- Venue: London Olympic Stadium
- Dates: 31 August and 1 September
- Competitors: 11 from 9 nations

Medalists
1st place, gold medalist(s)		Iurii Tsaruk	Ukraine
2nd place, silver medalist(s)		Teboho Mokgalagadi	South Africa
3rd place, bronze medalist(s)		Fu Xinhan	China

Athletics at the 2012 Summer Paralympics
Classification
T/F11–13: Blind and visually impaired
T/F20: Intellectual disability
T/F31–38: Cerebral palsy
F40: Les Autres
T/F42–46: Amputees
T/F51–58: Spinal cord disability
Men T/F31–38
Track
100 m	T34	T35	T36
T37	T38
200 m	T34	T35	T36
T37	T38
400 m	T36	T38
800 m	T36	T37
1500 m	T37
Field
Long jump	F36	F37-38
Shot put	F32-33	F34
F37-38
Club throw	F31-32/51
Discus throw	F32-34	F35-36
F37-38
Javelin throw	F33-34
Women T/F31–38
Track
100 m	T34	T35	T36
T37	T38
200 m	T34	T35	T36
T37	T38
400 m	T37
4×100 m relay	T35-38
Field
Long jump	F37-38
Shot put	F32-34	F35-36
F37
Club throw	F31-32/51
Discus throw	F35-36	F37
Javelin throw	F33-34/52-53	F37-38

The Men's 100 metres T35 event at the 2012 Summer Paralympics took place at the London Olympic Stadium on 31 August and 1 September.

The T35 category is for ambulant athletes with cerebral palsy. The typical T35 athlete may need assistive devices for walking. The athlete may have sufficient function to run but demonstrates poor balance.

== Records ==
Prior to the competition, the existing World and Paralympic records were as follows.

World & Paralympic record	Yang Sen (CHN)	12.29	Beijing, China	13 September 2008

== Results ==
=== Round 1 ===
Competed 31 August 2012 from 20:30. Qual. rule: First 3 in each heat (Q) plus the 2 fastest other times (q) qualified.

==== Heat 1 ====
Rank	Athlete	Country	Time	Notes
1	Fu Xinhan	China	13.12	Q
2	Hernan Barreto	Argentina	13.22	Q, RR
3	Niels Stein	Germany	13.41	Q, PB
4	Jordan Howe	Great Britain	13.75	q
5	Ivan Otleykin	Russia	14.06	
6	Pedro Marquez Villanueva, Jr	Mexico	15.14	
			Wind: -0.4 m/s	

==== Heat 2 ====
Rank	Athlete	Country	Time	Notes
1	Iurii Tsaruk	Ukraine	12.72	Q, RR
2	Teboho Mokgalagadi	South Africa	13.07	Q
3	Allel Boukhalfa	Algeria	13.26	Q
4	Anton Bubnov	Russia	13.86	q, PB
5	Sam Ruddock	Great Britain	13.92	
			Wind: -0.1 m/s	

=== Final ===
Competed 1 September 2012 at 19:46.

Rank	Athlete	Country	Time	Notes
1st place, gold medalist(s)	Iurii Tsaruk	Ukraine	12.62	RR
2nd place, silver medalist(s)	Teboho Mokgalagadi	South Africa	13.10	
3rd place, bronze medalist(s)	Fu Xinhan	China	13.12	SB
4	Hernan Barreto	Argentina	13.26	
5	Allel Boukhalfa	Algeria	13.38	
6	Niels Stein	Germany	13.52	
7	Jordan Howe	Great Britain	13.69	
8	Anton Bubnov	Russia	13.89	
			Wind: -0.2 m/s	

Q = qualified by place. q = qualified by time. RR = Regional Record. PB = Personal Best. SB = Seasonal Best.
