= Athletics at the 2012 Summer Paralympics – Women's 200 metres T35 =

Women's 200 metres T35 at the XIV Paralympic Games
- Venue: London Olympic Stadium
- Dates: 31 August
- Competitors: 8 from 7 nations
- Winning time: 32.72

Medalists
1st place, gold medalist(s)		Liu Ping	China
2nd place, silver medalist(s)		Oxana Corso	Italy
3rd place, bronze medalist(s)		Virginia McLachlan	Canada

Athletics at the 2012 Summer Paralympics
Classification
T/F11–13: Blind and visually impaired
T/F20: Intellectual disability
T/F31–38: Cerebral palsy
F40: Les Autres
T/F42–46: Amputees
T/F51–58: Spinal cord disability
Men T/F31–38
Track
100 m	T34	T35	T36
T37	T38
200 m	T34	T35	T36
T37	T38
400 m	T36	T38
800 m	T36	T37
1500 m	T37
Field
Long jump	F36	F37-38
Shot put	F32-33	F34
F37-38
Club throw	F31-32/51
Discus throw	F32-34	F35-36
F37-38
Javelin throw	F33-34
Women T/F31–38
Track
100 m	T34	T35	T36
T37	T38
200 m	T34	T35	T36
T37	T38
400 m	T37
4×100 m relay	T35-38
Field
Long jump	F37-38
Shot put	F32-34	F35-36
F37
Club throw	F31-32/51
Discus throw	F35-36	F37
Javelin throw	F33-34/52-53	F37-38

The Women's 200 metres T35 event at the 2012 Summer Paralympics took place at the London Olympic Stadium on 31 August. The event consisted of a single race.

The T35 category is for ambulant athletes with cerebral palsy. The typical T35 athlete may need assistive devices for walking. The athlete may have sufficient function to run but demonstrates poor balance.

== Records ==
Prior to the competition, the existing World and Paralympic records were as follows:

World record	Zanela Jaksyte (LTU)	36.57	26 August 2005	Espoo, Finland
Paralympic record	Not previously competed			

== Results ==
Competed 31 August 2012 at 20:15.

Rank	Athlete	Country	Time	Notes
1st place, gold medalist(s)	Liu Ping	China	32.72	
2nd place, silver medalist(s)	Oxana Corso	Italy	33.68	RR
3rd place, bronze medalist(s)	Virginia McLachlan	Canada	34.31	RR
4	Sophia Warner	Great Britain	35.25	PB
5	Anna Luxova	Czech Republic	35.43	PB
6	Erinn Walters	Australia	36.31	
7	Rachael Dodds	Australia	36.75	
8	Fatima Del Rocio Perez Garcia	Mexico	37.60	
			Wind: Nil	

Q = qualified by place. q = qualified by time. RR = Regional Record. PB = Personal Best. SB = Seasonal Best.
