= Liu Zhiming =

Liu Zhiming may refer to:

- Zhiming Liu (computer scientist) (born 1961), Chinese computer scientist
- Liu Zhiming (athlete) (born 1989), Chinese Paralympic athlete
