= Zhao Xu =

Zhao Xu may refer to:

- Emperor Shenzong of Song (1048–1085), Song dynasty Emperor with the personal name Zhao Xu
- Emperor Zhezong (1076–1100), Song dynasty Emperor with the personal name Zhao Xu
- Zhao Xu (athlete) (born 1985), Paralympian athlete from China
