= Wheelchair fencing at the 2012 Summer Paralympics – Women's foil A =

Women's Individual Foil A at the XIV Paralympic Games
- Venue: ExCeL
- Dates: 4 September 2012
- Competitors: 12 from 8 nations

Medalists
1st place, gold medalist(s)		Yu Chui Yee	Hong Kong
2nd place, silver medalist(s)		Baili Wu	China
3rd place, bronze medalist(s)		Zsuzsanna Krajnyák	Hungary

The women's individual foil A at the 2012 Summer Paralympics in London took place on 4 September 2012 at ExCeL Exhibition Centre. This class was for athletes who had good trunk control and their fencing arm was not affected by their impairment.

== Schedule ==
All times are British Summer Time

Date	Time	Round
4 September 2012	09:30	Qualification
4 September 2012	13:00	Quarterfinals
4 September 2012	17:45	Semifinals
4 September 2012	18:30	Final

== Competition format ==
The tournament started with a group phase round-robin followed by a knockout stage.

During a qualification round-robin, bouts last a maximum of three minutes, or until one athlete has scored five hits. There is then a knockout phase, in which bouts last a maximum of nine minutes (three periods of three minutes), or until one athlete has scored 15 hits.

== Results ==
=== Qualification ===
==== Pool A ====
Athlete	B	V	V/B	HS	HD	France (FRA)	China (CHN)	Hungary (HUN)	Macau (MAC)	Hong Kong (HKG)	Italy (ITA)
Delphine Bernard (FRA)	5	5	MAX	25	15	—	5–4	5–1	5–3	5–3	5–4
Rong Jing (CHN)	5	4	0.8	24	17	4–5	—	5–4	5–1	5–4	5–3
Zsuzsanna Krajnyak (HUN)	5	3	0.6	20	16	1–5	4–5	—	5–1	5–1	5–4
Lao In I (MAC)	5	2	0.4	15	23	3–5	1–5	1–5	—	5–4	5–4
Fan Pui Shan (HKG)	5	1	0.2	17	22	3–5	4–5	1–5	4–5	—	5–2
Loredana Trigilia (ITA)	5	0	0	17	25	4–5	3–5	4–5	4–5	2–5	—

==== Pool B ====
Athlete	B	V	V/B	HS	HD	Hong Kong (HKG)	China (CHN)	Russia (RUS)	France (FRA)	Hungary (HUN)	United States (USA)
Yu Chui Yee (HKG)	5	5	MAX	25	5	—	5–1	5–0	5–4	5–0	5–0
Wu Baili (CHN)	5	4	0.8	21	13	1–5	—	5–4	5–0	5–3	5–1
Evgeniya Sycheva (RUS)	5	2	0.4	18	19	0–5	4–5	—	4–5	5–4	5–0
Sabrina Poignet (FRA)	5	2	0.4	18	23	4–5	0–5	5–4	—	4–5	5–4
Veronika Juhasz (HUN)	5	2	0.4	14	24	0–5	3–5	4–5	5–4	—	2–5*
Catherine Bouwkamp (USA)	5	0	0	10	22	0–5	1–5	0–5	4–5	5–2*	—

=== Finals ===
Quarterfinals
7	Veronika Juhász (HUN)	15
2	Delphine Bernard (FRA)	9
3	Baili Wu (CHN)	15
6	Evgeniya Sycheva (RUS)	10
5	Zsuzsanna Krajnyák (HUN)	15
4	Jing Rong (CHN)	14
1	Yu Chui Yee (HKG)	15
8	Sabrina Poignet (FRA)	7

Semifinals
3	Baili Wu (CHN)	15
7	Veronika Juhász (HUN)	5
1	Yu Chui Yee (HKG)	15
5	Zsuzsanna Krajnyák (HUN)	4

Final
1	Yu Chui Yee (HKG)	15
3	Baili Wu (CHN)	13
Bronze Medal Match
5	Zsuzsanna Krajnyák (HUN)	15
7	Veronika Juhász (HUN)	4
