= Athletics at the 2012 Summer Paralympics – Men's 100 metres T36 =

Men's 100 metres T36 at the XIV Paralympic Games
- Venue: London Olympic Stadium
- Dates: 2 September
- Competitors: 12 from 9 nations

Medalists
1st place, gold medalist(s)		Evgenii Shvetcov	Russia
2nd place, silver medalist(s)		Graeme Ballard	Great Britain
3rd place, bronze medalist(s)		Roman Pavlyk	Ukraine

Athletics at the 2012 Summer Paralympics
Classification
T/F11–13: Blind and visually impaired
T/F20: Intellectual disability
T/F31–38: Cerebral palsy
F40: Les Autres
T/F42–46: Amputees
T/F51–58: Spinal cord disability
Men T/F31–38
Track
100 m	T34	T35	T36
T37	T38
200 m	T34	T35	T36
T37	T38
400 m	T36	T38
800 m	T36	T37
1500 m	T37
Field
Long jump	F36	F37-38
Shot put	F32-33	F34
F37-38
Club throw	F31-32/51
Discus throw	F32-34	F35-36
F37-38
Javelin throw	F33-34
Women T/F31–38
Track
100 m	T34	T35	T36
T37	T38
200 m	T34	T35	T36
T37	T38
400 m	T37
4×100 m relay	T35-38
Field
Long jump	F37-38
Shot put	F32-34	F35-36
F37
Club throw	F31-32/51
Discus throw	F35-36	F37
Javelin throw	F33-34/52-53	F37-38

The Men's 100 metres T36 event at the 2012 Summer Paralympics took place at the London Olympic Stadium on 2 September.

The T36 category is for ambulant athletes with cerebral palsy. These athletes do not have the capacity to remain still and they show involuntary movements with all four limbs affected. They usually walk without assistive devices.

== Records ==
Prior to the competition, the existing World and Paralympic records were as follows.

World record	Graeme Ballard (GBR)	11.98	Manchester, Great Britain	22 May 2012
Paralympic record	Roman Pavlyk (UKR)	12.25	Beijing, China	9 September 2008
Broken records during the 2012 Summer Paralympics
Paralympic record	Evgenii Shvetcov (RUS)	12.11	London, United Kingdom	2 September 2012
Paralympic record	Evgenii Shvetcov (RUS)	12.08	London, United Kingdom	2 September 2012

== Results ==
=== Round 1 ===
Competed 2 September 2012 from 10:23. Qual. rule: First 3 in each heat (Q) plus the 2 fastest other times (q) qualified.

==== Heat 1 ====
Rank	Athlete	Country	Time	Notes
1	Roman Pavlyk	Ukraine	12.50	Q
2	Graeme Ballard	Great Britain	12.68	Q
3	Xu Ran	China	12.86	Q, SB
4	Chris Clemens	United States	13.02	
5	Andrey Zhirnov	Russia	13.43	
6	Sergey Kharlamov	Kazakhstan	13.92	PB
			Wind: +0.7 m/s	

==== Heat 2 ====
Rank	Athlete	Country	Time	Notes
1	Evgenii Shvetcov	Russia	12.11	Q, PR
2	Ben Rushgrove	Great Britain	12.35	Q, SB
3	So Wa Wai	Hong Kong	12.38	Q, SB
4	Che Mian	China	12.45	q, SB
5	Marcin Mielczarek	Poland	12.84	q
6	Norberto M. Zertuche Rodriguez	Mexico	13.72	
			Wind: -0.3 m/s	

=== Final ===
Competed 2 September 2012 at 19:48.

Rank	Athlete	Country	Time	Notes
1st place, gold medalist(s)	Evgenii Shvetcov	Russia	12.08	PR
2nd place, silver medalist(s)	Graeme Ballard	Great Britain	12.24	
3rd place, bronze medalist(s)	Roman Pavlyk	Ukraine	12.26	=PB
4	So Wa Wai	Hong Kong	12.28	SB
5	Che Mian	China	12.31	=PB
6	Ben Rushgrove	Great Britain	12.37	
7	Xu Ran	China	12.74	SB
8	Marcin Mielczarek	Poland	12.80	
			Wind: +0.8 m/s	

Q = qualified by place. q = qualified by time. PR = Paralympic Record. PB = Personal Best. SB = Seasonal Best.
