= Cycling at the 2012 Summer Paralympics – Women's 500 m time trial C1–3 =

Cycling, women's 500m time trial C1–3 at the XIV Paralympic Games
- Venue: ExCeL Exhibition Centre
- Dates: 1 September 2012
- Competitors: 9 from 7 nations
- Winning time: 39.158

Medalists
1st place, gold medalist(s)		He Yin	China
2nd place, silver medalist(s)		Alyda Norbruis	Netherlands
3rd place, bronze medalist(s)		Jayme Paris	Australia

The women's 500 m time trial C1–3 track event in cycling at the 2012 Summer Paralympics took place on 1 September at London Velopark.

== Results ==
WR = World Record

Rank	Name	Country	Class	Factored time
1st place, gold medalist(s)	He Yin	China	C2	39.158 WR
2nd place, silver medalist(s)	Alyda Norbruis	Netherlands	C2	39.174
3rd place, bronze medalist(s)	Jayme Paris	Australia	C1	40.476 WR
4	Allison Jones	United States	C2	41.887
5	Zeng Sini	China	C2	43.207
6	Simone Kennedy	Australia	C3	43.892
7	Raquel Acinas Poncelas	Spain	C2	44.159
8	Anita Ruetz	Austria	C2	45.850
9	Tereza Diepoldova	Czech Republic	C2	46.578
