= Athletics at the 2012 Summer Paralympics – Women's 100 metres T36 =

Women's 100 metres T36 at the XIV Paralympic Games
- Venue: London Olympic Stadium
- Dates: 8 September
- Competitors: 11 from 9 nations

Medalists
1st place, gold medalist(s)		Elena Ivanova	Russia
2nd place, silver medalist(s)		Jeon Min-Jae	South Korea
3rd place, bronze medalist(s)		Claudia Nicoleitzik	Germany

Athletics at the 2012 Summer Paralympics
Classification
T/F11–13: Blind and visually impaired
T/F20: Intellectual disability
T/F31–38: Cerebral palsy
F40: Les Autres
T/F42–46: Amputees
T/F51–58: Spinal cord disability
Men T/F31–38
Track
100 m	T34	T35	T36
T37	T38
200 m	T34	T35	T36
T37	T38
400 m	T36	T38
800 m	T36	T37
1500 m	T37
Field
Long jump	F36	F37-38
Shot put	F32-33	F34
F37-38
Club throw	F31-32/51
Discus throw	F32-34	F35-36
F37-38
Javelin throw	F33-34
Women T/F31–38
Track
100 m	T34	T35	T36
T37	T38
200 m	T34	T35	T36
T37	T38
400 m	T37
4×100 m relay	T35-38
Field
Long jump	F37-38
Shot put	F32-34	F35-36
F37
Club throw	F31-32/51
Discus throw	F35-36	F37
Javelin throw	F33-34/52-53	F37-38

The Women's 100 metres T36 event at the 2012 Summer Paralympics took place at the London Olympic Stadium on 8 September.

The T36 category is for ambulant athletes with cerebral palsy. These athletes do not have the capacity to remain still and they show involuntary movements with all four limbs affected. They usually walk without assistive devices.

== Results ==
=== Round 1 ===
Competed 8 September 2012 from 10:28. Qual. rule: first 3 in each heat (Q) plus the 2 fastest other times (q) qualified.

==== Heat 1 ====
Rank	Athlete	Country	Time	Notes
1	Nadia Schaus	Argentina	15.04	Q, RR
2	Claudia Nicoleitzik	Germany	15.19	Q
3	Aygyul Sakhibzadaeva	Russia	15.32	Q
4	Hazel Robson	Great Britain	15.41	q, SB
5	Yu Chun Lai	Hong Kong	16.32	SB
6	Ainur Baiduldayeva	Kazakhstan	16.70	
			Wind: +1.3 m/s	

==== Heat 2 ====
Rank	Athlete	Country	Time	Notes
1	Elena Ivanova	Russia	14.65	Q
2	Jeon Min-Jae	South Korea	14.81	Q, PB
3	Yanina Andrea Martinez	Argentina	15.01	Q, RR
4	Yuki Kato	Japan	16.01	q, SB
5	Martha Liliana Hernandez Florian	Colombia	16.39	
			Wind: Nil	

=== Final ===
Competed 8 September 2012 at 19:08.

Rank	Athlete	Country	Time	Notes
1st place, gold medalist(s)	Elena Ivanova	Russia	14.44	SB
2nd place, silver medalist(s)	Jeon Min-Jae	South Korea	14.70	PB
3rd place, bronze medalist(s)	Claudia Nicoleitzik	Germany	14.88	
4	Yanina Andrea Martinez	Argentina	15.00	RR
5	Nadia Schaus	Argentina	15.14	
6	Aygyul Sakhibzadaeva	Russia	15.19	
7	Hazel Robson	Great Britain	15.23	SB
8	Yuki Kato	Japan	15.98	SB
			Wind: +0.7 m/s	

Q = qualified by place. q = qualified by time. RR = Regional Record. PB = Personal Best. SB = Seasonal Best.
