= Cao Yuanhang =

Chinese Paralympic athlete (born 1991)

Personal information
- Born: 20 November 1991 (age 34) Foshan, China
- Height: 169 cm (67 in)

Sport
- Country: China
- Sport: Athletics
- Disability class: T37
- Event: sprint
- Club: Guangdong Province
- Coached by: Zeng Huawei
Medal record
Track and field
Representing China
Paralympic Games
Silver medal – second place	2012 London	100m relay - T35-38
Bronze medal – third place	2012 London	Long jump - T37
World Championships
Bronze medal – third place	2015 Doha	100m relay - T35-38
Asian Para Games
Gold medal – first place	2014 Incheon	100m relay - T35-38
Bronze medal – third place	2014 Incheon	100m - T35/37/38

Cao Yuanhang (born 20 November 1991) is a Paralympian athlete from China competing mainly in T37 classification sprint and long jump events.

Cao represented her country at the 2012 Summer Paralympics in London, where she won two medals; an individual bronze in the T37 long jump and a silver in the women's 4 × 100 m relay (T35-38). As well as her Paralympic success Cao has won medals at both World Championships and the Asian Para Games, winning three medals over three tournament.

== Personal history ==
Cao was born in Foshan, China in 1991. Due to complications at birth she has cerebral palsy. She lives in Zhanjiang Province and is a professional athlete.
