= Chen Junfei =

Chinese Paralympic athlete

Chen Junefi
Personal information
- Born: 15 May 1992 (age 34)

Sport
- Country: China
- Sport: Athletics
- Disability class: T38
- Event: sprint
- Club: Hunan Province
- Coached by: Zhou Xiaoping
Medal record
Track and field)
Representing China
Paralympic Games
| Gold medal – first place | 2012 London | 200m - T38 |
| Gold medal – first place | 2016 Rio | 4 × 100 m – T35-38 |
| Silver medal – second place | 2012 London | 100m - T38 |
| Silver medal – second place | 2012 London | 100m relay - T35-38 |
World Championships
| Silver medal – second place | 2015 Doha | 100m - T38 |
| Silver medal – second place | 2015 Doha | 400m - T38 |
| Bronze medal – third place | 2013 Lyon | 100m - T38 |
| Bronze medal – third place | 2015 Doha | 200m - T38 |
| Bronze medal – third place | 2015 Doha | 100m relay - T35-38 |
Asian Para Games
| Gold medal – first place | 2014 Incheon | 100m - T38 |
| Gold medal – first place | 2014 Incheon | 200m - T38 |
| Gold medal – first place | 2014 Incheon | 400m - T38 |
| Gold medal – first place | 2014 Incheon | 100m relay - T35-38 |

Chen Junefi (born 15 May 1992) is a Paralympian athlete from China competing mainly in T38 classification sprint events.

Chen represented her country at the 2012 Summer Paralympics in London, where she won three medals; a gold in the 100m sprint and silvers in both the 200m sprint and the women's 4 x 100m relay (T35-38). As well as her Paralympic success Chen has won medals at both World Championships and the Asian Para Games, dominating her classification in the 2014 Asian Games in Incheon, where she took home four gold medals.

== Personal history ==
Chen was born in China in 1992. She has an impairment to her left hand. She lives in Hunan Province and received her higher education at Tianshui City Sports Institute. She is a professional athlete.
