= Xie Hexing =

Chinese Paralympic athlete

Personal information
- Born: Chenzhou, China
- Height: 168 cm (66 in)

Sport
- Country: China
- Sport: Athletics
- Disability class: T46
- Event: sprint
- Club: Hunan province
Medal record
Track and field
Representing China
Paralympic Games
Silver medal – second place	2012 London	100m relay – T42–46

Xie Hexing (born 16 November 1985) is a Paralympian athlete from China competing mainly in T46 classification sprint events.

Xie represented his country at the 2012 Summer Paralympics in London, where he competed at two events, the 400 metre sprint and as a member of the men's 4 × 100 m relay. He managed to make the finals of the 400 metre race, finishing in seventh overall. As part of the men's relay, Xie won a silver medal.

== Personal history ==
Xie was born in Chenzhou, China. At the age of two he lost his right arm in an accident with a rice machine.
