= Wang Zhiming (athlete) =

Chinese Paralympic athlete

Personal information
- Height: 144 cm (57 in)

Sport
- Country: China
- Sport: Athletics
- Disability class: F40
- Event(s): shot put discus throw javelin throw
Medal record
Track and field
Representing China
Paralympic Games
Gold medal – first place	2012 London	Discus – F40
Gold medal – first place	2012 London	Javelin – F40
Gold medal – first place	2012 London	Shot put – F40

Wang Zhiming is a Paralympian athlete from China competing mainly in F40 classification throwing events.

Wang represented China at the 2012 Summer Paralympics in London, entering the shot put, javelin throw and discus throw events. He won all three events in his classification and broke the world record with his final throw, recording a distance of 47.95 metres.
