= Liu Ping (sprinter) =

Chinese Paralympic sprinter (born 1984)

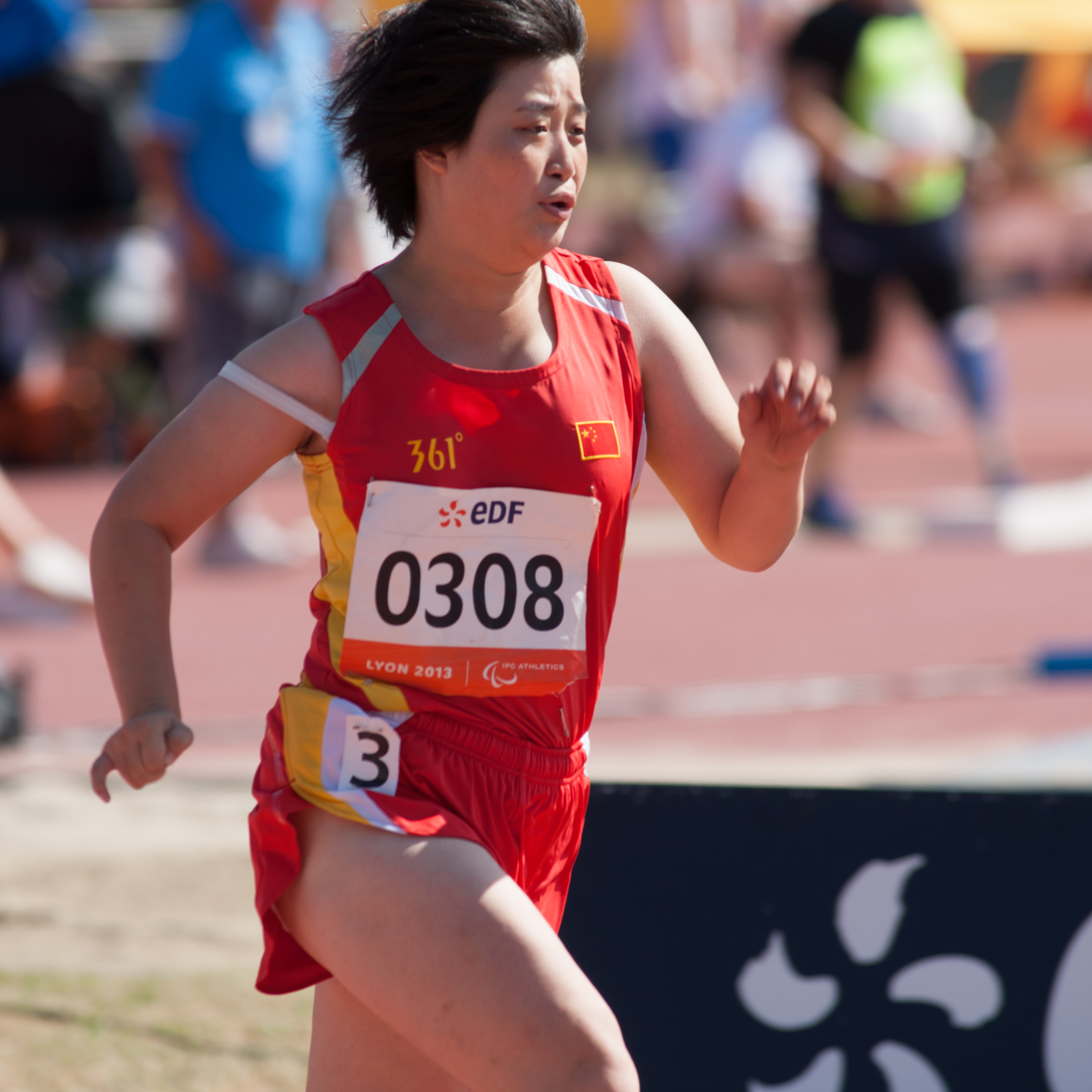
- Liu at the 2013 IPC Athletics World Championships

Personal information
- Nationality: China
- Born: 8 November 1984 (age 41) Tianjin, China
Medal record
Women's para athletics
Representing China
Paralympic Games
| Gold medal – first place | 2012 London | 100 metre T35 |
| Gold medal – first place | 2012 London | 200 metre T35 |
| Silver medal – second place | 2012 London | 4 × 100 m T35–38 |
World Championships
| Gold medal – first place | 2011 Christchurch | 100m – T35 |
| Bronze medal – third place | 2013 Lyon | 100m – T35 |
| Bronze medal – third place | 2015 Doha | 4 × 100 m relay – T35–38 |

Liu Ping (刘萍; born 8 November 1984) is a Chinese Paralympic sprinter who won gold medals in women's T35 100 metre and 200 metre sprints at the 2012 Summer Paralympics.
