= Xiong Dezhi =

Chinese Paralympic athlete

Personal information
- Born: 29 April 1988 (age 38) Yunnan, China
- Height: 165 cm (65 in)

Sport
- Country: China
- Sport: Athletics
- Disability class: T38
- Event: sprint
Medal record
Track and field
Representing China
Paralympic Games
Silver medal – second place	2012 London	100m relay – T35–38
Asian Para Games
Gold medal – first place	2010 Guangzhou	100m – T38
Gold medal – first place	2010 Guangzhou	200m – T38

Xiong Dezhi (born 29 April 1988) is a Paralympian athlete from China competing mainly in T38 classification sprint events. Xiong represented her country at the 2012 Summer Paralympics in London, where she a silver as part of the women's 4 × 100 m relay (T35–38). She also competed in the 100m and 200m (T38) sprint events, just finishing outside the medals in fourth position in both.

== Personal history ==
Xiong was born in Yunnan, China in 1988. She has cerebral palsy.
