= Iurii Tsaruk =

Ukrainian Paralympic athlete (born 1987)

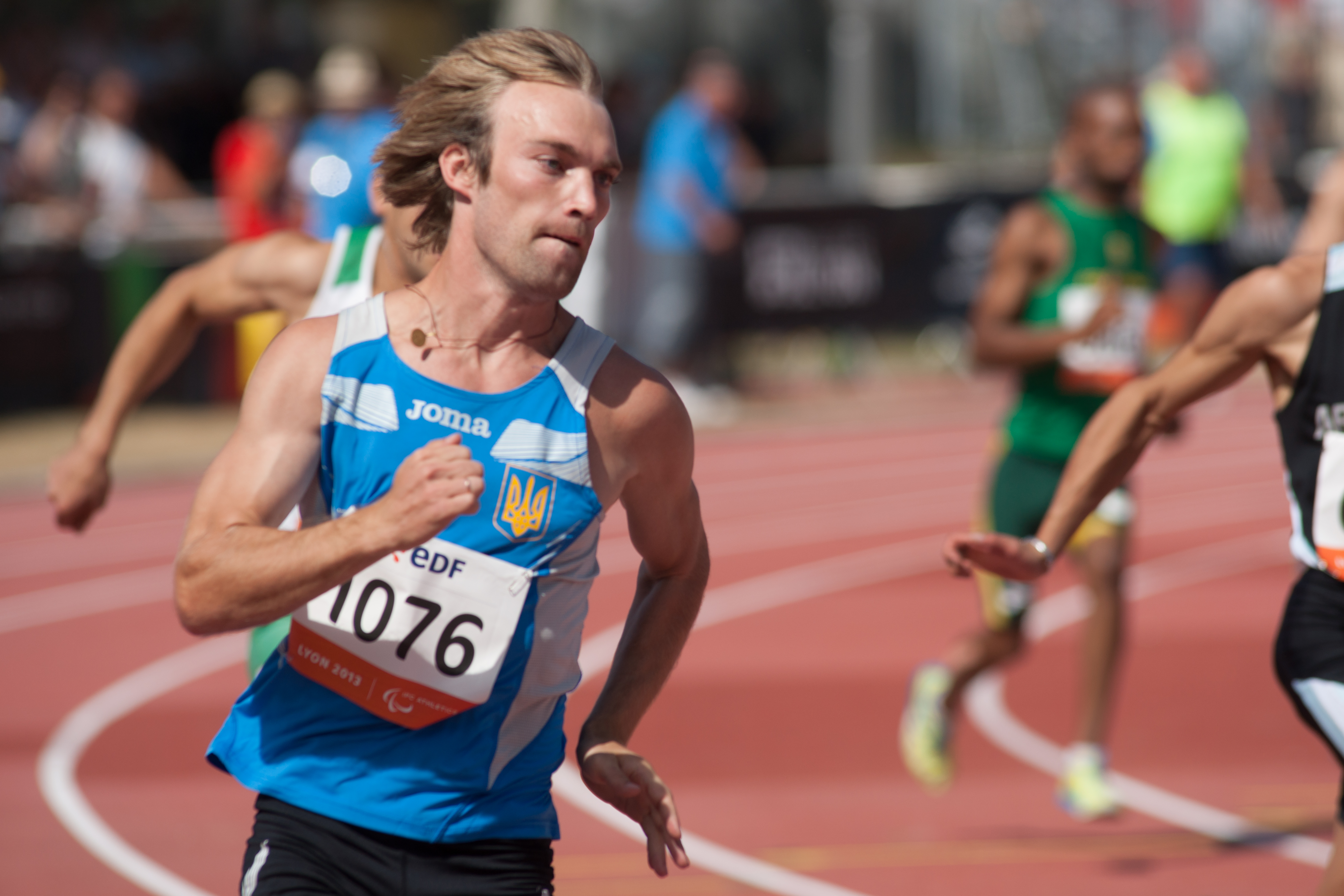
- Tsaruk during the 200 metres at the 2013 World Championships in Lyon.

Personal information
- Nationality: Ukrainian
- Born: Iurii Tsaruk; 2 May 1987 (age 39)

Sport
- Country: Ukraine
- Sport: Athletics
- Disability class: T35

Achievements and titles
- Paralympic finals: London 2012: Sprint
Medal record
Men's para athletics
Representing Ukraine
Paralympic Games
Gold medal – first place	2012 London	100 m T35
Gold medal – first place	2012 London	200 m T35
World Championships
Silver medal – second place	2013 Lyon	100 m T35
Silver medal – second place	2013 Lyon	200 m T35
Bronze medal – third place	2013 Lyon	4 × 100 m T35–38
Bronze medal – third place	2015 Doha	200 m T35
European Championships
Silver medal – second place	2014 Swansea	100 m T35
Silver medal – second place	2014 Swansea	200 m T35
Bronze medal – third place	2012 Stadskanaal	100 m T35
- Updated on 9 June 2014

Iurii Tsaruk (born 2 May 1987) is a Ukrainian athlete who competes in disability athletics in the T35 category. He won the gold medal for the 200 metres at the 2012 Paralympic Games for his category with a new World Record. Tsaruk set a European record to win the 100 metres at London 2012. Tsaruk won the silver medal in the 100 and 200 metres at the 2013 World Championships. In 2012 he also won a bronze medal for the 100 metres at the European Championships.
