= Liu Zhiming (athlete) =

Chinese Paralympic athlete (1989–2020)

Personal information
- Born: 8 February 1989
- Died: 25 February 2020 (aged 31)
Medal record
Track and field (athletics)
Representing China
Paralympic Games
Silver medal – second place	2012 London	4 × 100 m – T42–46

Liu Zhiming (Chinese: 刘治明; pinyin: Liú Zhìmíng; 8 February 1989 – 25 February 2020) was a sprint runner from the People's Republic of China. He ran in the T44 class. In the 2012 Paralympic Games, he won a silver medal as part of the Chinese 4 × 100 m relay team.
