= Zhao Xu (athlete) =

Chinese Paralympic athlete

Personal information
- Born: 16 November 1985 (age 40) Yuxi, China
- Height: 168 cm (66 in)

Sport
- Country: China
- Sport: Athletics
- Disability class: T46
- Event: sprint
- Club: Yunnan Province
Medal record
Track and field
Representing China
Paralympic Games
Gold medal – first place	2012 London	100m T46
Silver medal – second place	2012 London	4x100m relay T42–46
Asian Para Games
Gold medal – first place	2010 Guangzhou	100m T46

Zhao Xu (born 16 November 1985) is a Paralympian athlete from China competing mainly in T46 classification sprint events.

Zhao represented his country at the 2008 Summer Paralympics in Beijing, where he competed at two events, the 100 and 200 metre sprints. He managed to make the finals of the 100 metre race, finishing just outside the medals in fourth place. Four years later, at the 2012 Paralympics in London he won two medals, a gold in the 100 meter sprint and a silver as part of the men's 100 metre relay team.

== Personal history ==
Zhao was born in Yuxi, China in 1985. At the age of nine he touched a live electrical cable which resulted in the loss of his arms.
