= Catherine Bouwkamp =

American wheelchair fencer

Personal information
- Nationality: United States
- Born: February 13, 1996 (age 30) Indianapolis, Indiana
- Height: 5’2”
- Weight: 125 lb (57 kg)
Medal record
Athletics
U.S. Fencing National Wheelchair Championship
Silver medal – second place	2011 U.S. Fencing National Wheelchair Championship	Women's épée fencing
Gold medal – first place	2012 U.S. Fencing National Wheelchair Championship	Women's foil fencing
Gold medal – first place	2012 U.S. Fencing National Wheelchair Championship	Women's épée fencing
Parapan American Games
Silver medal – second place	2011 Parapan American Games	Women's épée fencing
Gold medal – first place	2011 Parapan American Games	Women's foil fencing
North American Cup
Bronze medal – third place	2010 North American Cup	Women's épée fencing
Bronze medal – third place	2010 North American Cup	Women's foil fencing
Bronze medal – third place	2010 North American Cup	Women's sabre fencing
Bronze medal – third place	2011 North American Cup	Women's épée fencing
Bronze medal – third place	2011 North American Cup	Women's foil fencing
Gold medal – first place	2012 North American Cup	Women's foil fencing
Gold medal – first place	2012 North American Cup	Women's sabre fencing
Other
Bronze medal – third place	2009 Warsaw Wheelchair World Cup	Women's sabre fencing
Gold medal – first place	2010 Montreal Wheelchair World Cup	Women's épée fencing

Catherine Bouwkamp (born 1996) is an American wheelchair fencer.

== Early life ==
Bouwkamp was born in Indianapolis, Indiana, in 1996 with a condition called fibular hemimelia.

== Career ==
She started competing in 2009. That is when she won her first medal at Warsaw Wheelchair World Cup. In 2010, she won her first gold medal at Montreal Wheelchair World Cup. In 2010 and 2011 respectively she won 5 bronze medals at North American Cup and in 2012 added gold 2 ones from the same place for foil and sabre fencing.

She also participated at U.S. Fencing National Wheelchair Championships where she won a silver medal in 2011 and 2 golds in 2012. On Parapan American Games in 2011 she also won a silver medal for épée and a gold one for foil.
