= Athletics at the 2012 Summer Paralympics – Women's 4 × 100 metres relay =

The Women's 4 × 100 m relay athletics events for the 2012 Summer Paralympics took place at the London Olympic Stadium on 4 September. A total of one event was contested over this distance with each leg being run by one of the four different classifications, T35, T36, T37 and T38.

== Results ==
=== T35/T38 ===
Rank	Lane	Nation	Competitors	Time	Notes
1st place, gold medalist(s)	6	Russia	Anastasiya Ovsyannikova, Svetlana Sergeeva, Elena Ivanova, Margarita Goncharova	54.86	
2nd place, silver medalist(s)	7	China	Xiong Dezhi, Cao Yuanhang, Liu Ping, Chen Junfei	55.65	RR
3rd place, bronze medalist(s)	9	Great Britain	Olivia Breen, Bethany Woodward, Katrina Hart, Jenny McLoughlin	56.08	SB
4	3	Australia	Torita Isaac, Jodi Elkington, Katy Parrish, Georgia Beikoff	56.32	RR
—N/a	4	Ukraine	Viktoriya Kravchenko, Maryna Snisar, Oksana Krechunyak, Inna Stryzhak	DNF	
—N/a	5	Germany	Maike Hausberger, Maria Seifert, Isabelle Foerder, Claudia Nicoleitzik	DQ	
