= Swimming at the 2012 Summer Paralympics – Women's 50 metre freestyle S12 =

Women's 50m Freestyle S12 at the XIV Paralympic Games
- Venue: London Aquatics Centre
- Dates: 7 September
- Competitors: 16 from 12 nations
- Winning time: 26.90

Medalists
1st place, gold medalist(s)		Oxana Savchenko	Russia
2nd place, silver medalist(s)		Natali Pronina	Azerbaijan
3rd place, bronze medalist(s)		Darya Stukalova	Russia

The women's 50m freestyle S12 event at the 2012 Summer Paralympics took place at the London Aquatics Centre on 7 September. There were two heats; the swimmers with the eight fastest times advanced to the final.

== Results ==
=== Heats ===
Competed from 11:23.

Rank	Heat	Lane	Name	Nationality	Time	Notes
1	1	4	Darya Stukalova	Russia	27.98	Q
2	1	2	Natali Pronina	Azerbaijan	28.10	Q
3	2	4	Oxana Savchenko	Russia	28.26	Q
4	1	5	Hannah Russell	Great Britain	28.32	Q
5	1	3	Deborah Font	Spain	28.68	Q
6	2	3	Joanna Mendak	Poland	28.81	Q
7	2	5	Anna Efimenko	Russia	29.77	Q
8	2	6	Yuliya Volkova	Ukraine	30.31	Q
9	2	2	Yaryna Matlo	Ukraine	30.68	
10	1	7	Belkys Mota	Venezuela	30.79	
11	2	1	Anabel Moro	Argentina	31.32	
12	2	7	Maryna Shtal	Ukraine	31.35	
13	1	8	Nicole Frycova	Czech Republic	32.45	
14	2	8	Raquel Viel	Brazil	32.79	
15	1	1	Karina Petrikovicova	Slovakia	33.53	
–	1	6	Naomi Maike Schnittger	Germany	DNS	

=== Final ===
Competed at 19:55.

Rank	Lane	Name	Nationality	Time	Notes
1st place, gold medalist(s)	3	Oxana Savchenko	Russia	26.90	WR
2nd place, silver medalist(s)	5	Natali Pronina	Azerbaijan	27.54	
3rd place, bronze medalist(s)	4	Darya Stukalova	Russia	27.75	
4	6	Hannah Russell	Great Britain	28.07	
5	7	Joanna Mendak	Poland	28.38	
6	1	Anna Efimenko	Russia	28.55	
7	2	Deborah Font	Spain	28.75	
8	8	Yuliya Volkova	Ukraine	29.99	

'Q = qualified for final. WR = World Record. DNS = Did not start.
