= Russia at the 2012 Summer Paralympics =

- IPC code: RUS
- NPC: Russian Paralympic Committee
- Website: www.paralymp.ru (in Russian)

in London
- Competitors: 182 in 12 sports
- Flag bearer: Alexey Ashapatov
- Medals Ranked 2nd: Gold 36 Silver 38 Bronze 28 Total 102

Summer Paralympics appearances (overview)
- 1996; 2000; 2004; 2008; 2012; 2016–2024

Other related appearances
- Soviet Union (1988); Unified Team (1992); RPC (2020)

Russia competed at the 2012 Summer Paralympics in London, United Kingdom, from 29 August to 9 September 2012. A total of 182 athletes were sent by the Russian Paralympic Committee to compete in twelve disciplines: athletics, archery, cycling, swimming, wheelchair fencing, table tennis, powerlifting, shooting, rowing, judo, 7-aside football and sitting volleyball.

== Medalists ==
Medal	Name	Sport	Event	Date
Gold	Sergey Punko	Swimming	Men's 400 metre freestyle S12	30 August
Gold	Oxana Savchenko	Swimming	Women's 400 metre freestyle S12	30 August
Gold	Margarita Goncharova	Athletics	Women's long jump F37/38	31 August
Gold	Roman Kapranov	Athletics	Men's 200 metres T37	31 August
Gold	Alexey Ashapatov	Athletics	Men's discus throw F57/58	31 August
Gold	Olesya Vladykina	Swimming	100 m breaststroke SB8	1 September
Gold	Elena Ivanova	Athletics	Women's 200 m T36	1 September
Gold	Margarita Goncharova	Athletics	Women's 100 m T38	1 September
Gold	Roman Makarov	Swimming	Men's 100 metre butterfly S12	2 September
Gold	Evgenii Shvetcov	Athletics	Men's 100 metres T36	2 September
Gold	Nikol Rodomakina	Athletics	Women's long jump F46	2 September
Gold	Alexey Labzin	Athletics	Men's 400 metres T13	2 September
Gold	Raisa Chebanika	Table Tennis	Women's singles- Class 6	3 September
Gold	Timur Tuchinov	Archery	Men's individual recurve – Standing	3 September
Gold	Oxana Savchenko	Swimming	Women's 200 metre individual medley SM12	3 September
Gold	Denis Tarasov	Swimming	Men's 50 metre freestyle S8	3 September
Gold	Alexey Ashapatov	Athletics	Men's shot put F57/58	4 September
Gold	Konstantin Lisenkov	Swimming	Men's 100 metre backstroke S8	4 September
Gold	Fedor Trikolich	Athletics	Men's 100 metres T12	4 September
Gold	Elena Pautova	Athletics	Women's 1500 m T12	4 September
Gold	Oxana Savchenko	Swimming	Women's 100 metre freestyle S12	4 September
Gold	Evgenii Shvetcov	Athletics	Men's 400 metres T36	4 September
Gold	Margarita Goncharova; Elena Ivanova; Anastasiya Ovsyannikova; Svetlana Sergeeva	Athletics	Women's 4 x 100 metre relay T35/T38	4 September
Gold	Mikhail Oyun; Oleg Shestakov; Timur Tuchinov	Archery	Men's team recurve – Open	5 September
Gold	Aleksandr Nevolin-Svetov	Swimming	Men's 100 metre backstroke S12	5 September
Gold	Oxana Savchenko	Swimming	Women's 100 metre backstroke S12	5 September
Gold	Gocha Khugaev	Athletics	Men's long jump F37/38	5 September
Gold	Evgeny Kegelev; Andrey Koptev; Alexey Labzin; Artem Loginov^{*} Fedor Trikolich	Athletics	Men's 4 x 100 metre relay T11/T13	5 September
Gold	Denis Gulin	Athletics	Men's triple jump F11	6 September
Gold	Evgenii Shvetcov	Athletics	Men's 800 metres T36	6 September
Gold	Nikita Prokhorov	Athletics	Men's shot put F46	6 September
Gold	Oxana Savchenko	Swimming	Women's 50 metre freestyle S12	7 September
Gold	Pavel Poltavtsev	Swimming	Men's 100 metre breaststroke SB9	8 September
Gold	Mikhail Zimin	Swimming	Men's 100 metre breaststroke SB12	8 September
Gold	Elena Ivanova	Athletics	Women's 100 metres T36	8 September
Gold	Russia men's national football 7-a-side team: Aleksei Chesmin; Aleksandr Kuligin; Andrei Kuvaev; Viacheslav Larionov; Aleksandr Lekov; Lasha Murvanadze; Zaurbek Pagaev; Ivan Potekhin; Eduard Ramonov; Vladislav Raretckii; Aslanbek Sapiev; Alexey Tumakov	Football 7-a-side	Men's team	9 September
Silver	Vladimir Balynetc	Powerlifting	Men's 48 kg	30 August
Silver	Marina Klimenchenko	Shooting	Women's P2-10m air pistol SH1	31 August
Silver	Roman Dubovoy	Swimming	Men's 100 metre butterfly S13	31 August
Silver	Olesya Lafina	Powerlifting	Women's 48 kg	1 September
Silver	Tamara Podpalnaya	Powerlifting	Women's 52 kg	1 September
Silver	Dmitry Grigorev	Swimming	Men's 100 metre butterfly S10	1 September
Silver	Tatiana Savostyanova	Judo	Women's 70 kg	1 September
Silver	Nataliya Gudkova	Athletics	Women's javelin throw F46	1 September
Silver	Dmitrii Kokarev	Swimming	Men's 200 metre freestyle S2	1 September
Silver	Anna Sorokina	Athletics	Women's javelin throw F12/13	2 September
Silver	Sergey Punko	Swimming	Men's 100 metre butterfly S12	2 September
Silver	Darya Stukalova	Swimming	Women's 100 metre butterfly S12	2 September
Silver	Alexander Zverev	Athletics	Men's 400 metres T13	2 September
Silver	Vladimir Andryushchenko	Athletics	Men's shot put F11/12	3 September
Silver	Oleg Shestakov	Archery	Men's individual recurve – Standing	3 September
Silver	Yulia Ovsyannikova	Table tennis	Women's singles C7	3 September
Silver	Sergey Malyshev	Shooting	Mixed P3-25m pistol SH1	3 September
Silver	Dmitrii Kokarev	Swimming	Men's 100 metre freestyle S2	3 September
Silver	Aleksandr Nevolin-Svetov	Swimming	Men's 200 metre individual medley SM12	3 September
Silver	Krestina Zhukova	Athletics	Women's long jump F20	3 September
Silver	Denis Tarasov	Swimming	Men's 100 metre backstroke S8	4 September
Silver	Aleksandr Nevolin-Svetov	Swimming	Men's 100 metre freestyle S12	4 September
Silver	Olesya Vladykina	Swimming	Women's 200 metre individual medley SM8	5 September
Silver	Egor Sharov	Athletics	Men's 800 metres T12	5 September
Silver	Nikol Rodomakina	Athletics	Women's 100 metres T46	5 September
Silver	Valery Ponomarenko	Shooting	Mixed 50 metre pistol SH1	6 September
Silver	Artem Pavlenko	Swimming	Men's 100 metre breaststroke SB14	6 September
Silver	Artem Arefyev	Athletics	Men's 800 metres T36	6 September
Silver	Aleksei Lyzhikhin	Swimming	Men's 50 metre backstroke S4	6 September
Silver	Denis Tarasov	Swimming	Men's 100 metre freestyle S8	6 September
Silver	Margarita Goncharova	Athletics	Women's 200 metres T38	6 September
Silver	Dmitrii Kokarev	Swimming	Men's 50 metre freestyle S2	7 September
Silver	Alexey Labzin	Athletics	Men's 200 metres T13	7 September
Silver	Aleksandr Nevolin-Svetov	Swimming	Men's 50 metre freestyle S12	7 September
Silver	Roman Dubovoy	Swimming	Men's 100 metre individual medley SM13	7 September
Silver	Alexey Kuznetsov	Athletics	Men's javelin throw F54/55/56	8 September
Silver	Fedor Trikolich	Athletics	Men's 200 metres T12	8 September
Silver	Denis Dorogaev^{*} Andrey Gladkov^{*} Dmitry Grigorev^{*} Konstantin Lisenkov; Pavel Poltavtsev; Eduard Samarin; Denis Tarasov; Evgeny Zimin^{*}	Swimming	Men's 4 x 100 metre medley relay 34pts	8 September
Bronze	Victoria Potapova	Judo	Women's 48 kg	30 August
Bronze	Vladimir Krivulya	Powerlifting	Men's 52 kg	31 August
Bronze	Shakhban Kurbanov	Judo	Men's 73 kg	31 August
Bronze	Vladimir Fedin	Judo	Men's 100 kg	1 September
Bronze	Irina Kalyanova	Judo	Women's +70 kg	1 September
Bronze	Aleksey Chuvashev	Rowing	Men's single sculls	2 September
Bronze	Anzhelika Kosacheva	Table tennis	Women's singles C11	2 September
Bronze	Aleksandr Golintovskii	Swimming	Men's 100 metre freestyle S13	2 September
Bronze	Andrey Gladkov^{*} Dmitry Grigorev; Konstantin Lisenkov; Pavel Poltavtsev^{*} Eduard Samarin^{*} Denis Tarasov; Evgeny Zimin	Swimming	Men's 4 x 100 metre freestyle relay 34pts	2 September
Bronze	Mikhail Oyun	Archery	Men's individual recurve – Standing	3 September
Bronze	Valery Ponomarenko	Shooting	Mixed P3-25m pistol SH1	3 September
Bronze	Sergey Punko	Swimming	Men's 200 metre individual medley SM12	3 September
Bronze	Darya Stukalova	Swimming	Women's 200 metre individual medley SM12	3 September
Bronze	Stepanida Artakhinova	Archery	Women's individual compound – Open	4 September
Bronze	Olesya Vladykina	Swimming	Women's 100 metre backstroke S8	4 September
Bronze	Darya Stukalova	Swimming	Women's 100 metre freestyle S12	4 September
Bronze	Aleksandr Golintovskii	Swimming	Men's 400 metre freestyle S13	4 September
Bronze	Vladimir Sviridov	Athletics	Men's long jump F36	5 September
Bronze	Svetlana Moshkovich	Cycling	Women's road time trial H3	5 September
Bronze	Dmitrii Kokarev	Swimming	Men's 50 metre backstroke S2	5 September
Bronze	Andrey Gladkov	Swimming	Men's 400 metre freestyle S7	6 September
Bronze	Konstantin Lisenkov	Swimming	Men's 100 metre freestyle S8	6 September
Bronze	Larisa Volik	Athletics	Women's javelin throw F57/58	6 September
Bronze	Artem Loginov	Athletics	Men's 200 metres T13	7 September
Bronze	Darya Stukalova	Swimming	Women's 50 metre freestyle S12	7 September
Bronze	Evgeniya Trushnikova	Athletics	Women's 400 metres T37	8 September
Bronze	Roman Kapranov	Athletics	Men's 100 metres T37	8 September
Bronze	Roman Dubovoy	Swimming	Men's 100 metre breaststroke SB13	8 September

^{*} – Indicates the athlete competed in preliminaries but not the final.

Medals by sport
Sport	1st place, gold medalist(s)	2nd place, silver medalist(s)	3rd place, bronze medalist(s)	Total
Athletics	19	12	5	36
Swimming	13	17	12	42
Archery	2	1	2	5
Table tennis	1	1	1	3
Football 7-a-side	1	0	0	1
Powerlifting	0	3	1	4
Shooting	0	3	1	4
Judo	0	1	4	5
Cycling	0	0	1	1
Rowing	0	0	1	1
Total	36	38	28	102

Medals by day
Day	Date	1st place, gold medalist(s)	2nd place, silver medalist(s)	3rd place, bronze medalist(s)	Total
1	30 August	2	1	1	4
2	31 August	3	2	2	7
3	1 September	3	6	2	11
4	2 September	4	4	4	12
5	3 September	4	7	4	15
6	4 September	7	2	4	13
7	5 September	5	3	3	11
8	6 September	3	6	3	12
9	7 September	1	4	2	7
10	8 September	3	3	3	9
11	9 September	1	0	0	1
Total		36	38	28	102

Multiple medalists
Name	Sport	1st place, gold medalist(s)	2nd place, silver medalist(s)	3rd place, bronze medalist(s)	Total
Oxana Savchenko	Swimming	5	0	0	5
Margarita Goncharova	Athletics	3	1	0	4
Elena Ivanova	Athletics	3	0	0	3
Evgenii Shvetcov	Athletics	3	0	0	3
Alexey Labzin	Athletics	2	1	0	3
Fedor Trikolich	Athletics	2	1	0	3
Alexey Ashapatov	Athletics	2	0	0	2
Timur Tuchinov	Archery	2	0	0	2
Denis Tarasov	Swimming	1	3	1	5
Aleksandr Nevolin-Svetov	Swimming	1	3	0	4
Konstantin Lisenkov	Swimming	1	1	2	4
Pavel Poltavtsev	Swimming	1	1	1	3
Sergey Punko	Swimming	1	1	1	3
Olesya Vladykina	Swimming	1	1	1	3
Nikol Rodomakina	Athletics	1	1	0	2
Oleg Shestakov	Archery	1	1	0	2
Roman Kapranov	Athletics	1	0	1	2
Mikhail Oyun	Archery	1	0	1	2
Dmitrii Kokarev	Swimming	0	3	1	4
Roman Dubovoy	Swimming	0	2	1	3
Dmitry Grigorev	Swimming	0	2	1	3
Darya Stukalova	Swimming	0	1	3	4
Andrey Gladkov	Swimming	0	1	2	3
Valery Ponomarenko	Shooting	0	1	1	2
Eduard Samarin	Swimming	0	1	1	2
Evgeny Zimin	Swimming	0	1	1	2
Aleksandr Golintovskii	Swimming	0	0	2	2

== Archery ==
Men

Athlete	Event	Ranking round		Round of 32	Round of 16	Quarterfinals	Semifinals	Finals	
Athlete	Event	Score	Seed	Opposition score	Opposition score	Opposition score	Opposition score	Opposition score	Rank
Alexey Shcherbakov	Ind. compound Open	631	20	Rodriguez (ESP); L 4-6	Did not advance				
Mikhail Oyun	Ind. recurve Standing	633	3	Bye	Inkaew (THA); W 7-1	Kopiy (UKR); W 6-2	Shestakov (RUS); L 2-6	Bennett (USA); W 6-0	3rd place, bronze medalist(s)
Oleg Shestakov	Ind. recurve Standing	603	11	Elliot (GBR); W 6-0	Alpers (GER); W 6-4	Korkmaz (TUR); W 6-4	Oyun (RUS); W 6-2	Tuchinov (RUS); L 3-7	2nd place, silver medalist(s)
Timur Tuchinov	Ind. recurve Standing	638	2	Bye	Kim (KOR); W 6-4	Chayka (UKR); W 6-0	Bennett (USA); W 6-2	Shestakov (RUS); W 7-3	1st place, gold medalist(s)
Mikhail Oyun; Oleg Shestakov; Timur Tuchinov	Team recurve Open	1869	2	—N/a	Bye	Turkey (TUR); W 212-199	China (CHN); W 214-207	South Korea (KOR); W 206-200	1st place, gold medalist(s)

Women

Athlete	Event	Ranking round		Round of 32	Round of 16	Quarterfinals	Semifinals	Finals	
Athlete	Event	Score	Seed	Opposition score	Opposition score	Opposition score	Opposition score	Opposition score	Rank
Stepanida Artakhinova	Ind. compound Open	672	2	—N/a	Bye	Polegaeva (RUS); W 6-0	Clarke (GBR); L 0-6	Lyzhnikova (RUS); W 7-3	3rd place, bronze medalist(s)
Marina Lyzhnikova	Ind. compound Open	647	4	—N/a	Bye	Su (TUR); W 6-0	Brown (GBR); L 2-6	Artakhinova (RUS); L 3-7	4
Olga Polegaeva	Ind. compound Open	631	10	—N/a	Reppe (SWE); W 6-4	Artakhinova (RUS); L 0-6	Did not advance		
Irina Batorova	Ind. recurve Standing	517	10	Bye	Kim (KOR); W 6-4	Olszewska (POL); L 4-6	Did not advance		

== Athletics ==
Men
Track events

Athlete	Event	Heat		Semifinal		Final	
Athlete	Event	Result	Rank	Result	Rank	Result	Rank
Alexey Akhtyamov	800 m T13	1:55.86 PB	5 q	—N/a		1:57.33	6
Alexey Akhtyamov	1500 m T13	3:55.46 PB	4 Q	—N/a		3:56.29	8
Artem Arefyev	400 m T36	—N/a				59.70	6
Artem Arefyev	800 m T36	—N/a				2:06.13 PB	2nd place, silver medalist(s)
Albert Asadullin	1500 m T11	4:25.98	5	—N/a		Did not advance	
Vladislav Barinov	100 m T37	12.85	8	—N/a		Did not advance	
Anton Bubnov	100 m T35	13.86	4 q	—N/a		13.89	8
Anton Bubnov	200 m T35	28.40	5 q	—N/a		28.21 PB	8
Roman Kapranov	100 m T37	11.61 RR	3 Q	—N/a		11.56 RR	3rd place, bronze medalist(s)
Roman Kapranov	200 m T37	23.24 PR	1 Q	—N/a		23.10 WR	1st place, gold medalist(s)
Pavel Kharagezov	800 m T36	—N/a				2:12.47 PB	4
Igor Khavlin	Marathon T12	—N/a				DSQ	–
Viacheslav Khrustalev	1500 m T20	—N/a				4:01.99	5
Gocha Khugaev	100 m T37	11.91 PB	3 Q	—N/a		11.89 PB	7
Gocha Khugaev	200 m T37	24.20	3 Q	—N/a		24.13	7
Andrey Koptev	100 m T11	DNS	–	Did not advance			
Dmitrii Kornilov	800 m T13	1:59.08	4	—N/a		Did not advance	
Dmitrii Kornilov	1500 m T13	4:02.75	8	—N/a		Did not advance	
Alexey Kotlov	400 m T46	51.52	6	—N/a		Did not advance	
Alexey Kotlov	800 m T46	2:00.21	5	—N/a		Did not advance	
Alexey Labzin	100 m T13	11.15	3 Q	—N/a		11.03 PB	4
Alexey Labzin	200 m T13	22.44	2 Q	—N/a		21.95 PB	2nd place, silver medalist(s)
Alexey Labzin	400 m T13	51.48	3 Q	—N/a		48.59 PR	1st place, gold medalist(s)
Artem Loginov	100 m T13	11.16	3 Q	—N/a		11.18	5
Artem Loginov	200 m T13	22.46	2 Q	—N/a		22.03 PB	3rd place, bronze medalist(s)
Yury Nosulenko	100 m T46	11.26	3	—N/a		Did not advance	
Yury Nosulenko	200 m T46	23.24	2 Q	—N/a		22.88	7
Ivan Otleykin	100 m T35	14.06	5	—N/a		Did not advance	
Ivan Otleykin	200 m T35	28.16	3 Q	—N/a		27.82 PB	6
Ildar Pomykalov	Marathon T12	—N/a				2:43.38	9
Ivan Prokopyev	100 m T44	12.21	6	—N/a		Did not advance	
Ivan Prokopyev	200 m T44	24.26	4	—N/a		Did not advance	
Ivan Prokopyev	400 m T44	53.86	5 q	—N/a		54.74	7
Egor Sharov	800 m T12	1:59.18	1 Q	—N/a		1:56.65	2nd place, silver medalist(s)
Egor Sharov	1500 m T13	3:55.70 PB	4 Q	—N/a		4:10.83	12
Evgenii Shvetcov	100 m T36	12.11 PR	1 Q	—N/a		12.08 PR	1st place, gold medalist(s)
Evgenii Shvetcov	400 m T36	—N/a				53.31 WR	1st place, gold medalist(s)
Evgenii Shvetcov	800 m T36	—N/a				2:05.32 PR	1st place, gold medalist(s)
Fedor Trikolich	100 m T12	10.91 PB	1 Q	—N/a		10.81 PB	1st place, gold medalist(s)
Fedor Trikolich	200 m T12	22.47	2 q	21.94 PB	1 Q	21.81 PB	2nd place, silver medalist(s)
Andrey Zhirnov	100 m T36	13.43	5	—N/a		Did not advance	
Andrey Zhirnov	200 m T36	—N/a				26.27	7
Andrey Zhirnov	400 m T36	—N/a				57.53	5
Alexander Zverev	200 m T13	22.18 PB	1 Q	—N/a		22.07 PB	4
Alexander Zverev	400 m T13	49.80	2 Q	—N/a		48.83 PB	2nd place, silver medalist(s)
Evgeny Kegelev; Andrey Koptev; Alexey Labzin; Artem Loginov^{*} Fedor Trikolich	4 × 100 m relay T11/T13	43.57	2 q	—N/a		42.66 PR	1st place, gold medalist(s)

Field events

Athlete	Event	Heat		Semifinal		Final	
Athlete	Event	Result	Rank	Result	Rank	Result	Rank
Vladimir Andryushchenko	Shot put F11/12	—N/a				15.21	2nd place, silver medalist(s)
Alexey Ashapatov	Discus throw F57/58	—N/a				60.72 WR	1st place, gold medalist(s)
Alexey Ashapatov	Shot put F57/58	—N/a				16.20 PR	1st place, gold medalist(s)
Vladislav Barinov	Long jump F37/38	—N/a				5.67	8
Alexander El'min	Discus throw F32/33/34	—N/a				39.85 RR	8
Alexander El'min	Shot put F34	—N/a				12.76 PB	4
Alexander Filatov	Discus throw F44	—N/a				45.16	7
Alexander Filatov	Shot put F42/44	—N/a				14.58	9
Evgeny Gudkov	Javelin throw F44	—N/a				53.78	4
Denis Gulin	Shot put F42/44	—N/a				5.18	12
Denis Gulin	Triple jump F11	—N/a				12.91	1st place, gold medalist(s)
Evgeny Kegelev	Triple jump F12	—N/a				13.87 PB	6
Gocha Khugaev	Long jump F37/38	—N/a				6.31 WR	1st place, gold medalist(s)
Andrey Koptev	Shot put F42/44	—N/a				6.29 PB	4
Andrey Koptev	Triple jump F11	—N/a				DNS	–
Alexey Kuznetsov	Javelin throw F54/55/56	—N/a				27.87	2nd place, silver medalist(s)
Nikita Prokhorov	Shot put F46	—N/a				15.68 WR	1st place, gold medalist(s)
Sergei Shatalov	Shot put F11/12	—N/a				13.63	7
Vladimir Sviridov	Long jump F36	—N/a				5.08	3rd place, bronze medalist(s)
Leonid Ustyuzhanin	Long jump F20	—N/a				6.59 PB	4

Women
Track events

Athlete	Event	Heat		Semifinal		Final	
Athlete	Event	Result	Rank	Result	Rank	Result	Rank
Margarita Goncharova	100 m T38	14.03	2 Q	—N/a		13.45 PB	1st place, gold medalist(s)
Margarita Goncharova	200 m T38	29.06	2 Q	—N/a		27.82 PB	2nd place, silver medalist(s)
Elena Ivanova	100 m T36	14.65	1 Q	—N/a		14.44	1st place, gold medalist(s)
Elena Ivanova	200 m T36	30.08	1 Q	—N/a		30.25	1st place, gold medalist(s)
Alexandra Moguchaya	200 m T46	27.48	5 q	—N/a		27.47 PB	8
Alexandra Moguchaya	400 m T46	—N/a				1:02.11 PB	5
Anastasiya Ovsyannikova	100 m T37	14.90	6	—N/a		Did not advance	
Anastasiya Ovsyannikova	200 m T37	30.99	4	—N/a		Did not advance	
Anastasiya Ovsyannikova	400 m T37	1:10.12	2 Q	—N/a		1:17.28	8
Elena Pautova	1500 m T12	—N/a				4:37.65	1st place, gold medalist(s)
Nikol Rodomakina	100 m T46	12.58	2 Q	—N/a		12.49 EU	2nd place, silver medalist(s)
Nikol Rodomakina	200 m T46	26.21	1 Q	—N/a		25.56 PB	4
Aygyul Sakhibzadaeva	100 m T36	15.32	3 Q	—N/a		15.19	6
Aygyul Sakhibzadaeva	200 m T36	34.99	5	—N/a		Did not advance	
Svetlana Sergeeva	100 m T37	14.89	6	—N/a		Did not advance	
Svetlana Sergeeva	200 m T37	30.84	6	—N/a		Did not advance	
Evgeniya Trushnikova	200 m T37	DQ	–	—N/a		Did not advance	
Evgeniya Trushnikova	400 m T37	1:09.30	2 Q	—N/a		1:07.35 PB	3rd place, bronze medalist(s)
Margarita Goncharova; Elena Ivanova; Anastasiya Ovsyannikova; Svetlana Sergeeva	4 × 100 m relay T35/T38	—N/a				54.86	1st place, gold medalist(s)

Field events

Athlete	Event	Heat		Semifinal		Final	
Athlete	Event	Result	Rank	Result	Rank	Result	Rank
Elena Burdykina	Javelin throw F33/34/52/53	—N/a				12.61	12
Elena Burdykina	Shot put F32/33/34	—N/a				6.83	11
Veronika Doronina	Javelin throw F33/34/52/53	—N/a				18.40	6
Veronika Doronina	Shot put F32/33/34	—N/a				7.06	9
Margarita Goncharova	Long jump F37/38	—N/a				4.84	1st place, gold medalist(s)
Nataliya Gudkova	Javelin throw F37/38	—N/a				41.08 PB	2nd place, silver medalist(s)
Marta Prokofyeva	Shot put F11/12	—N/a				12.25	8
Nikol Rodomakina	Long jump F46	—N/a				5.63	1st place, gold medalist(s)
Olga Sergienko	Javelin throw F57/58	—N/a				19.96	6
Olga Sergienko	Shot put F57/58	—N/a				7.87	12
Anna Sorokina	Javelin throw F12/13	—N/a				38.79 PB	2nd place, silver medalist(s)
Larisa Volik	Discus throw F57/58	—N/a				25.07	6
Larisa Volik	Javelin throw F57/58	—N/a				21.95 RR	3rd place, bronze medalist(s)
Larisa Volik	Shot put F57/58	—N/a				10.05 RR	6
Krestina Zhukova	Long jump F20	—N/a				5.38	2nd place, silver medalist(s)

== Cycling ==
=== Road ===
Athlete	Event	Time	Rank
Alexsey Obydennov	Men's time trial C3	24:58.19	8
Alexsey Obydennov	Men's road race C1-3	1:51.27	23
Svetlana Moshkovich	Women's time trial H3	34:08.48	3rd place, bronze medalist(s)
Svetlana Moshkovich	Women's road race H1-3	1:51:29	6

=== Track ===
Athlete	Event	Qualification		Final	
Athlete	Event	Time	Rank	Time	Rank
Alexsey Obydennov	Men's ind. 1 km time trial C1-3	—N/a		1:10.995	8
Alexsey Obydennov	Men's individual pursuit C3	3:43.244	4	Did not advance	

== Football 7-a-side ==
Squad list	Group stage		Semifinals	Finals	
Squad list	Opposition Result	Rank	Opposition Result	Opposition Result	Rank
From: Aleksei Chesmin; Aleksandr Kuligin; Andrei Kuvaev; Viacheslav Larionov; Aleksandr Lekov; Lasha Murvanadze; Zaurbek Pagaev; Ivan Potekhin; Eduard Ramonov; Vladislav Raretckii; Aslanbek Sapiev; Alexey Tumakov	Argentina; W 8–0	1 Q	Brazil; W 3–1	Ukraine; W 1–0	1st place, gold medalist(s)
From: Aleksei Chesmin; Aleksandr Kuligin; Andrei Kuvaev; Viacheslav Larionov; Aleksandr Lekov; Lasha Murvanadze; Zaurbek Pagaev; Ivan Potekhin; Eduard Ramonov; Vladislav Raretckii; Aslanbek Sapiev; Alexey Tumakov	Netherlands; W 8–0	1 Q	Brazil; W 3–1	Ukraine; W 1–0	1st place, gold medalist(s)
From: Aleksei Chesmin; Aleksandr Kuligin; Andrei Kuvaev; Viacheslav Larionov; Aleksandr Lekov; Lasha Murvanadze; Zaurbek Pagaev; Ivan Potekhin; Eduard Ramonov; Vladislav Raretckii; Aslanbek Sapiev; Alexey Tumakov	Iran; W 3–1	1 Q	Brazil; W 3–1	Ukraine; W 1–0	1st place, gold medalist(s)

Group play

Pos	Team	Pld	W	D	L	GF	GA	GD	Pts	Qualification
1	Russia (RUS)	3	3	0	0	19	1	+18	9	Qualified for the medal round
2	Iran (IRI)	3	2	0	1	13	5	+8	6	Qualified for the medal round
3	Netherlands (NED)	3	1	0	2	5	13	−8	3	Qualified for the classification round
4	Argentina (ARG)	3	0	0	3	2	20	−18	0	Qualified for the classification round

2012-09-01
9:00

Russia	8–0	Argentina
Kuligin 9', 49'; Murvanadze 21', 30'; Ramonov 35'; Kuvaev 38', 58'; Larionov 54'	Report

Riverbank Arena
Attendance: 4,074
Referee: Stephen Conroy (GBR)

2012-09-03
16:15

Russia	8–0	Netherlands
Larionov 23'; Ramonov 30', 50', 54'; Van Altena 34' (o.g.); Murvanadze 36', 39'; Potekhin 60+3'	Report

Riverbank Arena
Attendance: 10,561
Referee: Kevin Wright (GBR)

2012-09-05
9:00

Iran	1–3	Russia
Mehri 36' (pen.)	Report	Kuligin 18'; Larionov 37'; Ramonov 46'

Riverbank Arena
Attendance: 4,276
Referee: Keith Stroud (GBR)

Semifinals

2012-09-07
14:00

Russia	3–1	Brazil
Larionov 23'; Potekhin 34'; Kuligin 48'	Report	Silva de Oliveira 26'

Riverbank Arena
Attendance: 7,383
Referee: Ross Haswell (GBR)

Gold medal match

2012-09-09
16:00

Russia	1–0	Ukraine
Ramonov 44'	Report

Riverbank Arena
Attendance: 13,360
Referee: Keith Stroud (GBR)

== Judo ==
Men

Athlete	Event	Preliminaries	Quarterfinals	Semifinals	Repechage	Bronze	Final	Rank
Athlete	Event	Opposition Result	Opposition Result	Opposition Result	Opposition Result	Opposition Result	Opposition Result	Rank
Vladimir Fedin	-100 kg	Srijarung (THA); W 0200-0000	Tenorio (BRA); W 0011-0002	Porter (USA); L 0013-0101	BYE	Upmann (GER); W 1010-0000	Did not advance	3rd place, bronze medalist(s)
Gaydar Gaydarov	+100 kg	Zakiyev (AZE); L 0000-1000	Did not advance					
Oleg Kretsul	-90 kg	González (MEX); W 1000-0000	Asakereh (IRI); W 1000-0001	Hierrezuelo Marcillis (CUB); L 0000-1000	BYE	Crockett (USA); L 0000-1000	Did not advance	5
Shakhban Kurbanov	-73 kg	—N/a	Onel (TUR); W 1000-0001	Khalilov (UZB); L 0000-1000	BYE	Takahashi (JPN); W 1000-0000	Did not advance	3rd place, bronze medalist(s)
Victor Rudenko	-66 kg	Mustafayev (AZE); L 0002-0031	Did not advance					
Anatoly Shevchenko	-81 kg	Kato (JPN); W 0020-0002	Vazquez (ESP); L 0020-1000	Did not advance	Mirhassan Nattajsolhdar (IRI); W 0100-0003	Krieger (GER); L 0010-1110	Did not advance	5

Women

Athlete	Event	Round of 16	Quarterfinals	Semifinals	Repechage	Bronze	Final	Rank
Athlete	Event	Opposition Result	Opposition Result	Opposition Result	Opposition Result	Opposition Result	Opposition Result	Rank
Irina Kalyanova	+70 kg	—N/a	Manzuoli (FRA); L 1010-0000	Did not advance	Mihaylova (BUL); W 1000-0001	Silva de Almeida (BRA); W 0212-0113	Did not advance	3rd place, bronze medalist(s)
Victoria Potapova	-48 kg	—N/a	Brussig (GER); L 0001-1000	Did not advance	Garcia Benitez (ESP); W 0100-000	Ferreira (BRA); W 0010-0001	Did not advance	3rd place, bronze medalist(s)
Tatiana Savostyanova	-70 kg	—N/a	BYE	Szabo (HUN); W 0200-0000	BYE		Herrera Gomez (ESP); L 0002-0220	2nd place, silver medalist(s)
Alesia Stepaniuk	-52 kg	—N/a	Ferreira (BRA); W 0011-0001	Brussig (GER); L 0000-1010	BYE	Nikolaychyk (UKR); L 0000-1010	Did not advance	

== Powerlifting ==
Men

Athlete	Event	Total lifted	Rank
Karen Abramyants	-82.5 kg	165	11
Vladimir Balynetc	-48 kg	170	2nd place, silver medalist(s)
Ildar Bedderdinov	-56 kg	174	5
Vladimir Krivulya	-52 kg	175	3rd place, bronze medalist(s)
Vadim Rakitin	-90 kg	190	7
Sergei Sychev	-75 kg	213	4
Ayrat Zakiev	-60 kg	NM	-

Women

Athlete	Event	Total lifted	Rank
Kheda Berieva	-60 kg	106	4
Irina Kazantseva	-56 kg	101	5
Olesya Lafina	-48 kg	120	2nd place, silver medalist(s)
Vera Muratova	-67.5 kg	111	4
Tamara Podpalnaya	-52 kg	119	2nd place, silver medalist(s)
Tatiana Smirnova	-82.5 kg	112	5

== Rowing ==
Athlete(s)	Event	Heats		Repechage		Final	
Athlete(s)	Event	Time	Rank	Time	Rank	Time	Rank
Aleksey Chuvashev	Men's single sculls	4:46.99	2 R	4:56.67	1 FA	4:55.91	3rd place, bronze medalist(s)
Nadezda Andreeva; Fedor Levin	Mixed double sculls	4:44.08	6 R	4:47.34	5 FB	4:48.36	12
Ksenia Guseva; Mikhail Jakovlev; Viacheslav Makhov; Elena Naumova; Ekaterina Snegireva	Mixed coxed four	3:42.07	6 R	3:43.84	5 FB	3:42.73	11

== Shooting ==
Athlete	Event	Qualification		Final	
Athlete	Event	Score	Rank	Score	Rank
Natalia Dalekova	Women's P2-10m air pistol SH1	367	8	463.4	8
Marina Klimenchenko	Women's P2-10m air pistol SH1	378	2	469.6	2nd place, silver medalist(s)
Andrey Lebedinskiy	Men's P1-10m air pistol SH1	559	13	Did not advance	
Andrey Lebedinskiy	Mixed P3-25m pistol SH1	547	17	Did not advance	
Sergey Malyshev	Men's P1-10m air pistol SH1	565	6 Q	656.8	8
Sergey Malyshev	Mixed P3-25m pistol SH1	574	1 Q	765.5	2nd place, silver medalist(s)
Sergey Malyshev	Mixed P4-50m pistol SH1	531	8 Q	623.3	6
Sergey Nochevnoy	Mixed R3-10m air rifle prone SH1	600	1 Q	704.1	8
Sergey Nochevnoy	Mixed R4-10m air rifle prone SH2	597	14	Did not advance	
Sergey Nochevnoy	Mixed R6-50m air rifle prone SH1	588	10	Did not advance	
Valery Ponomarenko	Men's P1-10m air pistol SH1	563	8 Q	661.3	5
Valery Ponomarenko	Mixed P3-25m pistol SH1	564	4 Q	764.9	3rd place, bronze medalist(s)
Valery Ponomarenko	Mixed P4-50m pistol SH1	544	2 Q	633.2	2nd place, silver medalist(s)
Tatiana Ryabchenko	Mixed R3-10m air rifle prone SH1	599	10	Did not advance	
Tatiana Ryabchenko	Mixed R6-50m air rifle prone SH1	586	16	Did not advance	

== Swimming ==
Men

Athlete	Events	Heat		Final	
Athlete	Events	Time	Rank	Time	Rank
Alexander Chekurov	50 m freestyle S11	27.10	4 Q	26.38	4
Alexander Chekurov	100 m freestyle S11	1:01.99	5 Q	1:01.56	6
Alexander Chekurov	100 m butterfly S11	1:09.97	9	Did not advance	
Denis Dorogaev	100 m breaststroke SB9	1:10.68	5 Q	1:12.09	7
Roman Dubovoy	100 m breaststroke SB13	1:08.16	2 Q	1:07.06	3rd place, bronze medalist(s)
Roman Dubovoy	100 m butterfly S13	58.15	3 Q	56.37	2nd place, silver medalist(s)
Roman Dubovoy	100 m freestyle S13	54.29	7 Q	53.84	7
Roman Dubovoy	200 m ind. medley SM13	2:13.81	2 Q	2:10.16	2nd place, silver medalist(s)
Alexey Fomenkov	100 m backstroke S8	1:12.44	9	Did not advance	
Alexey Fomenkov	100 m breaststroke SB6	1:30.98	7 Q	1:32.55	7
Andrey Gladkov	50 m freestyle S7	31.84	11	Did not advance	
Andrey Gladkov	100 m backstroke S7	1:14.43	5 Q	1:14.26	6
Andrey Gladkov	100 m freestyle S7	1:06.38	7 Q	1:06.04	8
Andrey Gladkov	400 m freestyle S7	4:50.06	3 Q	4:46.76	3rd place, bronze medalist(s)
Aleksandr Golintovskii	50 m freestyle S13	24.96	8 Q	24.82	8
Aleksandr Golintovskii	100 m backstroke S13	1:06.68	10	Did not advance	
Aleksandr Golintovskii	100 m butterfly S13	1:03.26	11	Did not advance	
Aleksandr Golintovskii	100 m freestyle S13	53.66	4 Q	53.45	3rd place, bronze medalist(s)
Aleksandr Golintovskii	400 m freestyle S13	4:19.69	5 Q	4:11.13	3rd place, bronze medalist(s)
Dmitry Grigorev	50 m freestyle S10	25.07	6 Q	24.61 EU	5
Dmitry Grigorev	100 m breaststroke SB9	1:19.34	15	Did not advance	
Dmitry Grigorev	100 m butterfly S10	57.59 EU	1 Q	56.89 EU	2nd place, silver medalist(s)
Dmitry Grigorev	100 m freestyle S10	54.95	8 Q	54.33 EU	6
Dmitry Grigorev	200 m ind. medley SM10	2:18.91	9	Did not advance	
Dmitrii Kokarev	50 m backstroke S2	1:10.93	7 Q	1:05.70	3rd place, bronze medalist(s)
Dmitrii Kokarev	50 m freestyle S2	1:05.61	2 Q	1:02.47	2nd place, silver medalist(s)
Dmitrii Kokarev	100 m freestyle S2	2:18.30	2 Q	2:16.46	2nd place, silver medalist(s)
Dmitrii Kokarev	200 m freestyle S2	—N/a		4:39.23	2nd place, silver medalist(s)
Konstantin Lisenkov	50 m freestyle S8	26.92	4 Q	26.78	4
Konstantin Lisenkov	100 m backstroke S8	1:07.20	1 Q	1:05.43 PR	1st place, gold medalist(s)
Konstantin Lisenkov	100 m freestyle S8	59.03	3 Q	58.33	3rd place, bronze medalist(s)
Konstantin Lisenkov	200 m ind. medley SM8	2:33.87	8 Q	2:28.68	6
Aleksei Lyzhikhin	50 m backstroke S4	46.57	3 Q	46.73	2nd place, silver medalist(s)
Aleksei Lyzhikhin	50 m butterfly S5	51.30	16	Did not advance	
Aleksei Lyzhikhin	50 m breaststroke SB3	53.05	6 Q	53.22	7
Aleksei Lyzhikhin	50 m freestyle S4	44.08	11	Did not advance	
Aleksei Lyzhikhin	100 m freestyle S4	1:39.39	11	Did not advance	
Aleksei Lyzhikhin	150 m ind. medley SM4	2:51.85	8 Q	2:50.31	8
Roman Makarov	50 m freestyle S12	25.52	7 Q	25.57	8
Roman Makarov	100 m backstroke S12	1:03.76	5 Q	1:03.35	5
Roman Makarov	100 m butterfly S12	57.53	1 Q	57.21	1st place, gold medalist(s)
Roman Makarov	100 m freestyle S12	55.33	5 Q	55.44	6
Andrey Meshcheryakov	50 m backstroke S3	53.90	5 Q	56.11	7
Andrey Meshcheryakov	50 m breaststroke SB2	1:00.11	4 Q	1:02.31	7
Andrey Meshcheryakov	100 m freestyle S4	1:40.66	12	Did not advance	
Andrey Meshcheryakov	150 m ind. medley SM3	3:21.78	8 Q	3:13.40	8
Aleksandr Nevolin-Svetov	50 m freestyle S12	24.29	2 Q	23.96	2nd place, silver medalist(s)
Aleksandr Nevolin-Svetov	100 m backstroke S12	1:01.07	1 Q	59.35 WR	1st place, gold medalist(s)
Aleksandr Nevolin-Svetov	100 m freestyle S12	52.65	2 Q	51.70	2nd place, silver medalist(s)
Aleksandr Nevolin-Svetov	200 m ind. medley SM12	2:15.21	2 Q	2:14.45	2nd place, silver medalist(s)
Rustam Nurmukhametov	50 m freestyle S11	27.80	8 Q	28.15	8
Rustam Nurmukhametov	100 m backstroke S11	1:15.86	10	Did not advance	
Rustam Nurmukhametov	100 m freestyle S11	1:04.18	12	Did not advance	
Artem Pavlenko	100 m breaststroke SB14	1:08.08 EU	2 Q	1:08.38	2nd place, silver medalist(s)
Pavel Poltavtsev	100 m breaststroke SB9	1:08.96	2 Q	1:04.02 WR	1st place, gold medalist(s)
Pavel Poltavtsev	100 m butterfly S10	1:00.66	12	Did not advance	
Sergey Punko	100 m breaststroke SB12	1:13.87	10	Did not advance	
Sergey Punko	100 m butterfly S12	1:00.14	4 Q	59.47	2nd place, silver medalist(s)
Sergey Punko	100 m freestyle S12	55.99	6 Q	55.44	6
Sergey Punko	200 m ind. medley SM12	2:20.29	5 Q	2:14.83	3rd place, bronze medalist(s)
Sergey Punko	400 m freestyle S12	4:25.03	2 Q	4:10.26	1st place, gold medalist(s)
Eduard Samarin	100 m breaststroke SB8	1:18.05	11	Did not advance	
Eduard Samarin	100 m butterfly S9	1:03.17	9	Did not advance	
Eduard Samarin	100 m freestyle S9	1:00.73	16	Did not advance	
Eduard Samarin	200 m ind. medley SM9	2:29.14	14	Did not advance	
Eduard Samarin	400 m freestyle S9	4:38.10	11	Did not advance	
Stepan Smagin	50 m freestyle S13	25.62	12	Did not advance	
Stepan Smagin	100 m freestyle S13	55.42	11	Did not advance	
Stepan Smagin	200 m ind. medley SM13	2:20.99	8 Q	2:16.50	6
Stepan Smagin	400 m freestyle S13	4:28.37	8 Q	4:27.31	8
Denis Tarasov	50 m freestyle S8	25.92 WR	1 Q	25.82 WR	1st place, gold medalist(s)
Denis Tarasov	100 m backstroke S8	1:07.90	2 Q	1:06.93	2nd place, silver medalist(s)
Denis Tarasov	100 m butterfly S8	1:05.22	5 Q	1:02.05	5
Denis Tarasov	100 m freestyle S8	58.65	1 Q	57.52 EU	2nd place, silver medalist(s)
Evgeny Zimin	100 m breaststroke SB8	1:17.16	8 Q	1:17.26	8
Evgeny Zimin	100 m butterfly S8	1:05.82	6 Q	1:06.34	7
Evgeny Zimin	200 m ind. medley SM8	2:35.92	10	Did not advance	
Mikhail Zimin	100 m breaststroke SB12	1:08.73	2 Q	1:07.05 WR	1st place, gold medalist(s)
Mikhail Zimin	200 m ind. medley SM12	2:34.35	12	Did not advance	
Andrey Gladkov^{*} Dmitry Grigorev; Konstantin Lisenkov; Pavel Poltavtsev^{*} Eduard Samarin^{*} Denis Tarasov; Evgeny Zimin	4 × 100 m freestyle relay 34pts	4:00.30	4 Q	3:52.93	3rd place, bronze medalist(s)
Denis Dorogaev^{*} Andrey Gladkov^{*} Dmitry Grigorev^{*} Konstantin Lisenkov; Pavel Poltavtsev; Eduard Samarin; Denis Tarasov; Evgeny Zimin^{*}	4 × 100 m medley relay 34pts	4:24.45	2 Q	4:09.08 EU	2nd place, silver medalist(s)

Women

Athlete	Events	Heat		Final	
Athlete	Events	Time	Rank	Time	Rank
Anastasia Diodorova	50 m butterfly S6	39.71	4 Q	40.47	7
Anastasia Diodorova	50 m freestyle S6	40.07	17	Did not advance	
Anastasia Diodorova	100 m backstroke S6	1:33.61	7 Q	1:34.48	8
Anastasia Diodorova	200 m individual medley SM6	3:26.42	6 Q	3:26.77	7
Anastasia Diodorova	400 m freestyle S6	6:49.35	13	Did not advance	
Anna Efimenko	50 m freestyle S12	29.77	7 Q	28.55	6
Anna Efimenko	100 m backstroke S12	1:15.69	4 Q	1:12.58	4
Anna Efimenko	100 m freestyle S12	1:09.00	12	Did not advance	
Anna Efimenko	400 m freestyle S12	4:57.33	5 Q	4:51.29	4
Natalia Gavrilyuk	50 m butterfly S5	58.74	11	Did not advance	
Natalia Gavrilyuk	100 m breaststroke SB4	2:14.76	10	Did not advance	
Natalia Gavrilyuk	200 m individual medley SM5	4:23.58	9	Did not advance	
Irina Grazhdanova	50 m freestyle S9	30.14	6 Q	29.66	5
Irina Grazhdanova	100 m breaststroke SB9	1:26.85	11	Did not advance	
Irina Grazhdanova	100 m freestyle S9	1:08.31	11	Did not advance	
Irina Grazhdanova	100 m butterfly S9	1:14.50	9	Did not advance	
Oxana Guseva	50 m butterfly S7	41.57	12	Did not advance	
Oxana Guseva	50 m freestyle S7	36.80	10	Did not advance	
Oxana Guseva	100 m backstroke S7	1:35.09	12	Did not advance	
Oxana Guseva	100 m breaststroke SB6	1:54.36	7 Q	1:49.41	5
Oxana Guseva	200 m individual medley SM7	3:15.81	7 Q	3:15.87	8
Irina Kolmogorova	50 m backstroke S4	56.51	4 Q	55.37	4
Anna Kolosova	100 m breaststroke SB8	1:26.29	5 Q	1:27.58	6
Irina Lavrova	50 m freestyle S11	36.43	15	Did not advance	
Irina Lavrova	100 m breaststroke SB11	1:40.03	9	Did not advance	
Irina Lavrova	400 m freestyle S11	7:01.18	11	Did not advance	
Nina Ryabova	50 m freestyle S10	29.15	4 Q	28.85	4
Nina Ryabova	100 m backstroke S10	1:11.46	4 Q	1¨12.27	7
Nina Ryabova	100 m breaststroke SB9	1:22.47	5 Q	1:19.67	4
Nina Ryabova	100 m butterfly S10	1:09.13	2 Q	1:09.13	4
Nina Ryabova	200 m ind. medley SM10	2:36.04	5 Q	2:35.65	5
Oxana Savchenko	50 m freestyle S12	28.26	3 Q	26.90 WR	1st place, gold medalist(s)
Oxana Savchenko	100 m backstroke S12	1:13.29	3 Q	1:07.99 WR	1st place, gold medalist(s)
Oxana Savchenko	100 m freestyle S12	1:02.36	2 Q	58.41 WR	1st place, gold medalist(s)
Oxana Savchenko	200 m ind. medley SM12	2:38.13	2 Q	2:28.00 WR	1st place, gold medalist(s)
Oxana Savchenko	400 m freestyle S12	4:48.10	3 Q	4:37.89	1st place, gold medalist(s)
Ksenia Sogomonyan	50 m freestyle S8	32.92	10	Did not advance	
Ksenia Sogomonyan	100 m backstroke S8	1:27.57	12	Did not advance	
Ksenia Sogomonyan	100 m butterfly S8	1:21.61	10	Did not advance	
Ksenia Sogomonyan	100 m freestyle S8	1:15.96	13	Did not advance	
Olga Sokolova	100 m backstroke S11	1:25.76	5 Q	1:25.13	7
Olga Sokolova	100 m breaststroke SB11	1:40.28	10	Did not advance	
Olga Sokolova	200 m ind. medley SM11	3:24.81	16	Did not advance	
Darya Stukalova	50 m freestyle S12	27.98	1 Q	27.75	3rd place, bronze medalist(s)
Darya Stukalova	100 m butterfly S12	—N/a		1:06.27	2nd place, silver medalist(s)
Darya Stukalova	100 m freestyle S12	1:02.94	4 Q	1:00.23	3rd place, bronze medalist(s)
Darya Stukalova	200 m ind. medley SM12	2:39.71	3 Q	2:28.73	3rd place, bronze medalist(s)
Olesya Vladykina	50 m freestyle S8	31.93	4 Q	31.59	4
Olesya Vladykina	100 m backstroke S8	1:21.82	3 Q	1:20.20	3rd place, bronze medalist(s)
Olesya Vladykina	100 m breaststroke SB8	1:23.12	2 Q	1:17.17 WR	1st place, gold medalist(s)
Olesya Vladykina	100 m freestyle S8	1:11.74	6 Q	1:10.50	5
Olesya Vladykina	200 m ind. medley SM8	2:48.69	2 Q	2:41.79	2nd place, silver medalist(s)
Irina Grazhdanova; Oxana Guseva; Nina Ryabova; Olesya Vladykina	4 × 100 m freestyle relay 34pts	—N/a		4:37.31	6
Irina Grazhdanova; Oxana Guseva; Nina Ryabova; Olesya Vladykina	4 × 100 m medley relay 34pts	—N/a		4:54.36	4

== Table tennis ==
Men

Athlete	Event	Group matches		First round	Quarterfinals	Semifinals	Final	
Athlete	Event	Opposition Result	Rank	Opposition Result	Opposition Result	Opposition Result	Opposition Result	Rank
Alexander Esaulov	Singles C6	Michell (BRA); W 3-0 Park (KOR); W 3-1	1 Q	—N/a	Thainiyom (THA); L 0-3	Did not advance		
Pavel Lukyanov	Singles C10	Bakar (MAS); L 1-3 Lu (CHN); W 3-2	2	—N/a	Did not advance			
Iurii Nozdrunov	Singles C9	Heijnen (NED); W 3-1 Aulie (NOR); L 1-3	2	—N/a	Did not advance			
Sergey Poddubnyy	Singles C2	Revucky (SVK); W 3-0 Molliens (FRA); L 1-3	1 Q	—N/a	Boury (FRA); W 3-2	Kim (KOR); L 0-3	Lamirault (FRA); L 2-3	4
Pavel Lukyanov; Iurii Nozdrunov	Team C9-10	—N/a		Hungary (HUN); L 2-3	Did not advance			

Women

Athlete	Event	Group matches		First round	Quarterfinals	Semifinals	Final	
Athlete	Event	Opposition Result	Rank	Opposition Result	Opposition Result	Opposition Result	Opposition Result	Rank
Raisa Chebanika	Singles C6	Marszal (POL); W 3-0 Khodzynska (UKR); L 1-3; Jang (KOR); W 3-1	2 Q	—N/a		Klymenko (UKR); W 3-2	Khodzynska (UKR); W 3-0	1st place, gold medalist(s)
Olga Gorshkaleva	Singles C9	Mairie (FRA); L 1-3 Liu (CHN); W 3-0; Jankowska (POL); L 2-3	3	—N/a		Did not advance		
Anzhelika Kosacheva	Singles C11	Bromley (GBR); W 3-0 Wong (HKG); L 1-3	2 Q	—N/a		Yeung (HKG); L 1-3	Siemieniecka (POL); W 3-1	3rd place, bronze medalist(s)
Yulia Ovsyannikova	Singles C7	Mahmoud (EGY); W 3-1 Safonova (UKR); W 3-0; Schrijver (NED); W 3-0	1 Q	—N/a		Öçsoy (TUR); W 3-2	van Zon (NED); L 1-3	2nd place, silver medalist(s)
Nadezda Pushpasheva	Singles C1–2	Maenpuak (THA); W 3-1 Buclaw (POL); W 3-0	1 Q	—N/a		Pezzutto (ITA); L 0-3	Lafaye Marziou (FRA); L 2-3	4
Olga Gorshkaleva; Yulia Ovsyannikova	Team C6-10	—N/a		BYE	Turkey (TUR); L 2-3	Did not advance		

== Volleyball ==
=== Men's tournament ===
Overview

Team	Group stage		Quarter-finals	Semi-finals	Finals	
Team	Opposition Result	Rank	Opposition Result	Opposition Result	Opposition Result	Rank
Russia	Great Britain; W 3–0	2 Q	Brazil; W 3–2	Iran; L 0–3	Germany; L 2–3	4
Russia	Germany; L 2–3	2 Q	Brazil; W 3–2	Iran; L 0–3	Germany; L 2–3	4
Russia	Egypt; W 3–2	2 Q	Brazil; W 3–2	Iran; L 0–3	Germany; L 2–3	4
Russia	Morocco; W 3–0	2 Q	Brazil; W 3–2	Iran; L 0–3	Germany; L 2–3	4

Roster

The following is the Russian roster in the men's volleyball tournament of the 2012 Summer Paralympics.

Head coach: Viktor Dyakov

№	Name	Date of birth	Position	2012 club
1	Tanatkan Bukin	15 January 1967	UN	(Russia) AVS Rodnik
2	Sergei Pozdeev	9 August 1979	L	(Russia) AVS Rodnik
3	Viktor Milenin	20 November 1987	OS	(Russia) AVS Rodnik
4	Sergei Yakunin	27 February 1961	SE	(Russia) AVS Rodnik
5	Svyatoslav Kartashev	10 July 1989	SE	(Russia) AVS Rodnik
6	Aleksei Volkov	14 March 1983	SE	(Russia) AVS Rodnik
7	Dmitry Gordienko	17 October 1975	WS	(Russia) AVS Rodnik
8	Evgeny Volosnikov	24 January 1994	UN	(Russia) AVS Rodnik
9	Andrei Lavrinovich	4 December 1976	WS	(Russia) AVS Rodnik
11	Anatoliy Krupin	5 February 1984	WS	(Russia) AVS Rodnik
12	Aleksandr Savichev	11 March 1989	OS	(Russia) AVS Rodnik

Group play

Pos	Team	Pld	W	L	Pts	SW	SL	SR	SPW	SPL	SPR
1	Germany	4	4	0	8	12	3	4.000	340	266	1.278
2	Russia	4	3	1	7	11	5	2.200	356	275	1.295
3	Egypt	4	2	2	6	9	6	1.500	424	402	1.055
4	Great Britain	4	1	3	5	3	9	0.333	230	276	0.833
5	Morocco	4	0	4	4	0	12	0.000	157	300	0.523

30 August 2012; 14:00	Great Britain	0–3	Russia	ExCeL London, London; Referees: Ronaldo Chaves (BRA), Benno Meijer (NED)
30 August 2012; 14:00	(14–25, 18–25, 20–25); Report			ExCeL London, London; Referees: Ronaldo Chaves (BRA), Benno Meijer (NED)

1 September 2012; 11:00	Russia	2–3	Germany	ExCeL London, London; Referees: Khalid Shanishah (LBA), Janko Plešnik (SLO)
1 September 2012; 11:00	(18–25, 25–11, 19–25, 25–15, 13–15); Report			ExCeL London, London; Referees: Khalid Shanishah (LBA), Janko Plešnik (SLO)

2 September 2012; 21:00	Egypt	2–3	Russia	ExCeL London, London; Referees: Dominik Raca (CRO), Ronaldo Chaves (BRA)
2 September 2012; 21:00	(25–22, 25–19, 18–25, 21–25, 11–15); Report			ExCeL London, London; Referees: Dominik Raca (CRO), Ronaldo Chaves (BRA)

4 September 2012; 14:00	Russia	3–0	Morocco	ExCeL London, London; Referees: Adnan Kolos (BIH), Dimosthenis Kostopoulos (GRE)
4 September 2012; 14:00	(25–13, 25–8, 25–11); Report			ExCeL London, London; Referees: Adnan Kolos (BIH), Dimosthenis Kostopoulos (GRE)

Quarterfinals

5 September 2012; 11:20	Russia	3–2	Brazil	ExCeL London, London; Referees: Khalid Shanishah (LBA), Jung Mal-Soon (KOR)
5 September 2012; 11:20	(18–25, 25–15, 25–15, 19–25, 15–8); Report			ExCeL London, London; Referees: Khalid Shanishah (LBA), Jung Mal-Soon (KOR)

Semifinals

6 September 2012; 21:00	Russia	0–3	Iran	ExCeL London, London; Referees: Benno Meijer (NED), Ronaldo Chaves (BRA)
6 September 2012; 21:00	(15–25, 18–25, 18–25); Report			ExCeL London, London; Referees: Benno Meijer (NED), Ronaldo Chaves (BRA)

Bronze medal match

8 September 2012; 16:00	Germany	3–2	Russia	ExCeL London, London; Referees: Dariusz Jasinski (POL), Glynn Archibald (GBR)
8 September 2012; 16:00	(20–25, 26–24, 22–25, 25–22, 16–14); Report			ExCeL London, London; Referees: Dariusz Jasinski (POL), Glynn Archibald (GBR)

== Wheelchair fencing ==
Individual

Athlete	Event	Qualification			Round of 16	Quarterfinal	Semifinal	Final / BM	
Athlete	Event	Opposition	Score	Rank	Opposition Score	Opposition Score	Opposition Score	Opposition Score	Rank
Ivan Andreev	Men's foil A	Chan (HKG)	L 4-5	4	Demchuk (UKR); W 15-12	Ye (CHN); L 6-15	Did not advance		
Ivan Andreev	Men's foil A	Rodriguez (USA)	W 5-3	4	Demchuk (UKR); W 15-12	Ye (CHN); L 6-15	Did not advance		
Ivan Andreev	Men's foil A	Osvath (HUN)	L 1-5	4	Demchuk (UKR); W 15-12	Ye (CHN); L 6-15	Did not advance		
Ivan Andreev	Men's foil A	Lemoine (FRA)	W 5-3	4	Demchuk (UKR); W 15-12	Ye (CHN); L 6-15	Did not advance		
Timur Fayzullin	Men's sabre A	Makowski (POL)	W 5-2		Stanczuk (POL); L 14-15	Did not advance			
Timur Fayzullin	Men's sabre A	Chan (HKG)	L 3-5		Stanczuk (POL); L 14-15	Did not advance			
Timur Fayzullin	Men's sabre A	Chen (CHN)	W 5-2		Stanczuk (POL); L 14-15	Did not advance			
Timur Fayzullin	Men's sabre A	Alexakis (GRE)	W 5-1		Stanczuk (POL); L 14-15	Did not advance			
Sergey Frolov	Men's sabre A	El Assine (FRA)	W 5-2		BYE	Chen (CHN); L 6-15	Did not advance		
Sergey Frolov	Men's sabre A	Razali (MAS)	W 5-0		BYE	Chen (CHN); L 6-15	Did not advance		
Sergey Frolov	Men's sabre A	Stanczuk (POL)	W 5-4		BYE	Chen (CHN); L 6-15	Did not advance		
Sergey Frolov	Men's sabre A	Pylarinos (GRE)	L 4-5		BYE	Chen (CHN); L 6-15	Did not advance		
Timur Khamatshin	Men's foil B	Szekeres (HUN)	L 4-5		Did not advance				
Timur Khamatshin	Men's foil B	Moreno (USA)	W 5-4		Did not advance				
Timur Khamatshin	Men's foil B	Latreche (FRA)	L 2-5		Did not advance				
Timur Khamatshin	Men's foil B	Hu (CHN)	L 1-5		Did not advance				
Alexandr Kurzin	Men's épée B	Mainville (CAN)	L 3-5		Did not advance				
Alexandr Kurzin	Men's épée B	Bezyazychny (BLR)	L 4-5		Did not advance				
Alexandr Kurzin	Men's épée B	Pluta (POL)	L 4-5		Did not advance				
Alexandr Kurzin	Men's épée B	Silva Guissone (BRA)	L 3-5		Did not advance				
Alexandr Kurzin	Men's sabre B	François (FRA)	L 2-5		Cratere (FRA); L 9-15	Did not advance			
Alexandr Kurzin	Men's sabre B	Brinson (USA)	W 5-3		Cratere (FRA); L 9-15	Did not advance			
Alexandr Kurzin	Men's sabre B	Triantafyllou (GRE)	L 3-5		Cratere (FRA); L 9-15	Did not advance			
Alexandr Kurzin	Men's sabre B	Castro (POL)	W 5-2		Cratere (FRA); L 9-15	Did not advance			
Alexander Kuzyukov	Men's épée B	Chung (HKG)	W 5-4		Pluta (POL); W 8-5	Bezyazychny (BLR); L 10-15	Did not advance		
Alexander Kuzyukov	Men's épée B	Hu (CHN)	L 3-5		Pluta (POL); W 8-5	Bezyazychny (BLR); L 10-15	Did not advance		
Alexander Kuzyukov	Men's épée B	Lemiashkevich (BLR)	W 5-3		Pluta (POL); W 8-5	Bezyazychny (BLR); L 10-15	Did not advance		
Alexander Kuzyukov	Men's épée B	Cratere (FRA)	L 2-5		Pluta (POL); W 8-5	Bezyazychny (BLR); L 10-15	Did not advance		
Artur Yusupov	Men's épée A	Demchuk (UKR)	W 5-4		BYE	Citerne (FRA); W 15-10	Pender (POL); L 14-15	Betti (ITA); L 10-15	4
Artur Yusupov	Men's épée A	Betti (ITA)	W 5-3		BYE	Citerne (FRA); W 15-10	Pender (POL); L 14-15	Betti (ITA); L 10-15	4
Artur Yusupov	Men's épée A	van der Wege (USA)	W 5-0		BYE	Citerne (FRA); W 15-10	Pender (POL); L 14-15	Betti (ITA); L 10-15	4
Artur Yusupov	Men's épée A	Juhasz (HUN)	W 5-3		BYE	Citerne (FRA); W 15-10	Pender (POL); L 14-15	Betti (ITA); L 10-15	4
Artur Yusupov	Men's foil A	Chen (CHN)	L 2-5	2	Makowski (POL); W 15-13	Tokatlian (FRA); L 10-15	Did not advance		
Artur Yusupov	Men's foil A	Betti (ITA)	W 5-3	2	Makowski (POL); W 15-13	Tokatlian (FRA); L 10-15	Did not advance		
Artur Yusupov	Men's foil A	Pender (POL)	W 5-4	2	Makowski (POL); W 15-13	Tokatlian (FRA); L 10-15	Did not advance		
Artur Yusupov	Men's foil A	Mato (HUN)	W 5-2	2	Makowski (POL); W 15-13	Tokatlian (FRA); L 10-15	Did not advance		
Marat Yusupov	Men's foil B	François (FRA)	L 3-5		BYE	Hu (CHN); L 13-15	Did not advance		
Marat Yusupov	Men's foil B	Bezyazychny (BLR)	W 5-2		BYE	Hu (CHN); L 13-15	Did not advance		
Marat Yusupov	Men's foil B	Czop (POL)	W 5-0		BYE	Hu (CHN); L 13-15	Did not advance		
Marat Yusupov	Men's foil B	Palavecino (ARG)	W 5-0		BYE	Hu (CHN); L 13-15	Did not advance		
Marat Yusupov	Men's sabre B	Datsko (UKR)	L 2-5		BYE	Mainville (CAN); W 15-9	Cratere (FRA); L 13-15	Sarri (ITA); L 7-15	4
Marat Yusupov	Men's sabre B	Bogdos (GRE)	W 5-2		BYE	Mainville (CAN); W 15-9	Cratere (FRA); L 13-15	Sarri (ITA); L 7-15	4
Marat Yusupov	Men's sabre B	Boehm (AUT)	W 5-1		BYE	Mainville (CAN); W 15-9	Cratere (FRA); L 13-15	Sarri (ITA); L 7-15	4
Marat Yusupov	Men's sabre B	Sarri (ITA)	L 4-5		BYE	Mainville (CAN); W 15-9	Cratere (FRA); L 13-15	Sarri (ITA); L 7-15	4
Yulia Efimova	Women's épée A	Juhasz (HUN)	L 1-2		—N/a	Krajnyak (HUN); L 7-15	Did not advance		
Yulia Efimova	Women's épée A	Morel (CAN)	W 5-0		—N/a	Krajnyak (HUN); L 7-15	Did not advance		
Yulia Efimova	Women's épée A	Yu (HKG)	W 5-3		—N/a	Krajnyak (HUN); L 7-15	Did not advance		
Yulia Efimova	Women's épée A	Poignet (FRA)	W 5-1		—N/a	Krajnyak (HUN); L 7-15	Did not advance		
Yulia Efimova	Women's épée A	Kim (KOR)	W 5-2		—N/a	Krajnyak (HUN); L 7-15	Did not advance		
Irina Mishurova	Women's foil B	Moore (GBR)	W 5-2		—N/a	Dani (HUN); L 3-15	Did not advance		
Irina Mishurova	Women's foil B	Palfi (HUN)	W 5-0		—N/a	Dani (HUN); L 3-15	Did not advance		
Irina Mishurova	Women's foil B	Zhou (CHN)	L 0-5		—N/a	Dani (HUN); L 3-15	Did not advance		
Irina Mishurova	Women's foil B	Lukianenko (UKR)	W 5-1		—N/a	Dani (HUN); L 3-15	Did not advance		
Evgeniya Sycheva	Women's foil A	Juhasz (HUN)	W 5-4		—N/a	Wu (CHN); L 10-15	Did not advance		
Evgeniya Sycheva	Women's foil A	Bouwkamp (USA)	W 5-0		—N/a	Wu (CHN); L 10-15	Did not advance		
Evgeniya Sycheva	Women's foil A	Poignet (FRA)	L 4-5		—N/a	Wu (CHN); L 10-15	Did not advance		
Evgeniya Sycheva	Women's foil A	Wu (CHN)	L 4-5		—N/a	Wu (CHN); L 10-15	Did not advance		
Liudmila Vasileva	Women's épée B	Dani (HUN)	W 5-1		—N/a	Pozniak (UKR); W 5-1	Briese-Baetke (GER); L 9-15	Chan (HKG); L 13-15	4
Liudmila Vasileva	Women's épée B	Jana (THA)	L 3-5		—N/a	Pozniak (UKR); W 5-1	Briese-Baetke (GER); L 9-15	Chan (HKG); L 13-15	4
Liudmila Vasileva	Women's épée B	Briese-Baetke (GER)	L 3-5		—N/a	Pozniak (UKR); W 5-1	Briese-Baetke (GER); L 9-15	Chan (HKG); L 13-15	4
Liudmila Vasileva	Women's épée B	Makrytskaya (BLR)	W 5-3		—N/a	Pozniak (UKR); W 5-1	Briese-Baetke (GER); L 9-15	Chan (HKG); L 13-15	4
Liudmila Vasileva	Women's épée B	Moore (GBR)	W 5-3		—N/a	Pozniak (UKR); W 5-1	Briese-Baetke (GER); L 9-15	Chan (HKG); L 13-15	4
Liudmila Vasileva	Women's foil B	Dani (HUN)	L 2-5		—N/a	Zhou (CHN); L 11-15	Did not advance		
Liudmila Vasileva	Women's foil B	Chan (HKG)	L 2-5		—N/a	Zhou (CHN); L 11-15	Did not advance		
Liudmila Vasileva	Women's foil B	Yao (CHN)	W 5-4		—N/a	Zhou (CHN); L 11-15	Did not advance		
Liudmila Vasileva	Women's foil B	Makowska (POL)	L 3-5		—N/a	Zhou (CHN); L 11-15	Did not advance		

Teams

Athlete	Event	Quarterfinal	Classification matches 5–8		Semifinal	Final / BM	Rank
Athlete	Event	Opposition Score	Opposition Score	Opposition Score	Opposition Score	Opposition Score	Rank
Ivan Andreev; Artur Yusupov; Marat Yusupov	Men's team open	France (FRA); L 41-45	Great Britain (GBR); W 45-15	Ukraine (UKR); W 45-37	Did not advance		5
Yulia Efimova; Evgeniya Sycheva; Liudmila Vasileva	Women's team open	China (CHN); L 38-45	Great Britain (GBR); W 45-28	Ukraine (UKR); W 45-23	Did not advance		5

== See also ==
- 2012 Summer Paralympics
- Russia at the Paralympics
- Russia at the 2012 Summer Olympics
