= Swimming at the 2012 Summer Paralympics – Women's 100 metre breaststroke SB12 =

Women's 100m Breaststroke SB12 at the XIV Paralympic Games
- Venue: London Aquatics Centre
- Dates: 8 September
- Competitors: 13 from 9 nations
- Winning time: 1:16.17

Medalists
1st place, gold medalist(s)		Natali Pronina	Azerbaijan
2nd place, silver medalist(s)		Karolina Pelendritou	Cyprus
3rd place, bronze medalist(s)		Yaryna Matlo	Ukraine

The women's 100m breaststroke SB12 event at the 2012 Summer Paralympics took place at the London Aquatics Centre on 8 September. There were two heats; the swimmers with the eight fastest times advanced to the final.

== Results ==
=== Heats ===
Competed from 10:16.

==== Heat 1 ====
Rank	Lane	Name	Nationality	Time	Notes
1	3	Maryna Shtal	Ukraine	1:23.55	Q
2	6	Anabel Moro	Argentina	1:23.81	Q, AM
3	4	Yaryna Matlo	Ukraine	1:24.98	Q
4	5	Yuliya Volkova	Ukraine	1:27.40	Q
5	2	Raquel Viel	Brazil	1:32.00	
6	7	Matilde Alcázar	Mexico	1:35.43	

==== Heat 2 ====
Rank	Lane	Name	Nationality	Time	Notes
1	4	Karolina Pelendritou	Cyprus	1:19.33	Q
2	3	Natali Pronina	Azerbaijan	1:20.09	Q
3	5	Deborah Font	Spain	1:23.57	Q
4	6	Carla Casals	Spain	1:23.95	Q
5	2	Lenka Zahradnikova	Czech Republic	1:28.26	
6	7	Nicole Frycova	Czech Republic	1:30.29	
7	1	Karina Petrikovičová	Slovakia	1:39.44	

=== Final ===
Competed at 18:05.

Rank	Lane	Name	Nationality	Time	Notes
1st place, gold medalist(s)	5	Natali Pronina	Azerbaijan	1:16.17	WR
2nd place, silver medalist(s)	4	Karolina Pelendritou	Cyprus	1:16.38	
3rd place, bronze medalist(s)	1	Yaryna Matlo	Ukraine	1:20.21	
4	6	Deborah Font	Spain	1:22.22	
5	3	Maryna Shtal	Ukraine	1:23.11	
6	7	Carla Casals	Spain	1:23.22	
7	2	Anabel Moro	Argentina	1:23.42	AM
8	8	Yuliya Volkova	Ukraine	1:26.06	

'Q = qualified for final. WR = World Record. AM = Americas Record.
