= Swimming at the 2012 Summer Paralympics – Women's 100 metre backstroke S12 =

Women's 100m Backstroke S12 at the XIV Paralympic Games
- Venue: London Aquatics Centre
- Dates: 5 September
- Competitors: 11 from 9 nations
- Winning time: 1:07.99

Medalists
1st place, gold medalist(s)		Oxana Savchenko	Russia
2nd place, silver medalist(s)		Natali Pronina	Azerbaijan
3rd place, bronze medalist(s)		Hannah Russell	Great Britain

The women's 100m backstroke S12 event at the 2012 Summer Paralympics took place at the London Aquatics Centre on 5 September. There were two heats; the swimmers with the eight fastest times advanced to the final.

== Results ==
=== Heats ===
Competed from 10:55.

==== Heat 1 ====
Rank	Lane	Name	Nationality	Time	Notes
1	4	Oxana Savchenko	Russia	1:13.29	Q
2	5	Yaryna Matlo	Ukraine	1:16.61	Q
3	6	Maryna Shtal	Ukraine	1:23.90	Q
4	2	Nicole Frycova	Czech Republic	1:29.39	
	3	Amaya Alonso	Spain	DSQ	

==== Heat 2 ====
Rank	Lane	Name	Nationality	Time	Notes
1	4	Hannah Russell	Great Britain	1:11.18	Q
2	6	Natali Pronina	Azerbaijan	1:12.79	Q
3	5	Anna Efimenko	Russia	1:15.69	Q
4	3	Karina Petrikovičová	Slovakia	1:19.56	Q
5	2	Raquel Viel	Brazil	1:21.74	Q
6	7	Matilde Alcázar	Mexico	1:34.39	

=== Final ===
Competed at 19:01.

Rank	Lane	Name	Nationality	Time	Notes
1st place, gold medalist(s)	3	Oxana Savchenko	Russia	1:07.99	WR
2nd place, silver medalist(s)	5	Natali Pronina	Azerbaijan	1:09.46	
3rd place, bronze medalist(s)	4	Hannah Russell	Great Britain	1:10.15	
4	6	Anna Efimenko	Russia	1:12.58	
5	2	Yaryna Matlo	Ukraine	1:13.74	
6	7	Karina Petrikovičová	Slovakia	1:20.48	
7	1	Raquel Viel	Brazil	1:21.10	
8	8	Maryna Shtal	Ukraine	1:22.11	

'Q = qualified for final. WR = World Record. DSQ = Disqualified.
