= Swimming at the 2012 Summer Paralympics – Women's 100 metre freestyle S12 =

Women's 100m Freestyle S12 at the XIV Paralympic Games
- Venue: London Aquatics Centre
- Dates: 4 September
- Competitors: 17 from 12 nations
- Winning time: 58.41

Medalists
1st place, gold medalist(s)		Oxana Savchenko	Russia
2nd place, silver medalist(s)		Natali Pronina	Azerbaijan
3rd place, bronze medalist(s)		Darya Stukalova	Russia

The women's 100m freestyle S12 event at the 2012 Summer Paralympics took place at the London Aquatics Centre on 4 September. There were three heats; the swimmers with the eight fastest times advanced to the final.

== Results ==
=== Heats ===
Competed from 11:24.

==== Heat 1 ====
Rank	Lane	Name	Nationality	Time	Notes
1	4	Hannah Russell	Great Britain	1:02.22	Q
2	6	Belkys Mota	Venezuela	1:06.72	Q
3	3	Maryna Shtal	Ukraine	1:08.51	
4	2	Karina Petrikovicova	Slovakia	1:11.81	
	5	Naomi Maike Schnittger	Germany	DNS	

==== Heat 2 ====
Rank	Lane	Name	Nationality	Time	Notes
1	4	Darya Stukalova	Russia	1:02.94	Q
2	3	Joanna Mendak	Poland	1:03.61	Q
3	6	Natali Pronina	Azerbaijan	1:04.97	Q
4	5	Anna Efimenko	Russia	1:09.00	
5	7	Lenka Zahradnikova	Czech Republic	1:14.69	
	2	Raquel Viel	Brazil	DNS	

==== Heat 3 ====
Rank	Lane	Name	Nationality	Time	Notes
1	4	Oxana Savchenko	Russia	1:02.36	Q
2	5	Deborah Font	Spain	1:02.62	Q
3	3	Yuliya Volkova	Ukraine	1:05.50	Q
4	6	Amaya Alonso	Spain	1:07.77	
5	2	Anabel Moro	Argentina	1:08.79	
6	7	Nicole Frycova	Czech Republic	1:16.09	

=== Final ===
Competed at 19:42.

Rank	Lane	Name	Nationality	Time	Notes
1st place, gold medalist(s)	5	Oxana Savchenko	Russia	58.41	WR
2nd place, silver medalist(s)	7	Natali Pronina	Azerbaijan	1:00.00	
3rd place, bronze medalist(s)	6	Darya Stukalova	Russia	1:00.23	
4	2	Joanna Mendak	Poland	1:01.07	
5	3	Deborah Font	Spain	1:02.06	
6	4	Hannah Russell	Great Britain	1:02.38	
7	1	Yuliya Volkova	Ukraine	1:05.40	
8	8	Belkys Mota	Venezuela	1:07.21	

'Q = qualified for final. WR = World Record. DNS = Did not start.
