= Swimming at the 2012 Summer Paralympics – Women's 200 metre individual medley SM12 =

Women's 200m Ind. Medley SM12 at the XIV Paralympic Games
- Venue: London Aquatics Centre
- Dates: 3 September
- Competitors: 14 from 9 nations
- Winning time: 2:28.00

Medalists
1st place, gold medalist(s)		Oxana Savchenko	Russia
2nd place, silver medalist(s)		Natali Pronina	Azerbaijan
3rd place, bronze medalist(s)		Darya Stukalova	Russia

The women's 200m ind. medley SM12 event at the 2012 Summer Paralympics took place at the London Aquatics Centre on 3 September. There were two heats; the swimmers with the eight fastest times advanced to the final.

== Results ==
=== Heats ===
Competed from 11:15.

==== Heat 1 ====
Rank	Lane	Name	Nationality	Time	Notes
1	4	Darya Stukalova	Russia	2:39.71	Q
2	5	Deborah Font	Spain	2:40.75	Q
3	3	Yaryna Matlo	Ukraine	2:42.91	Q
4	6	Maryna Shtal	Ukraine	2:52.26	
5	2	Raquel Viel	Brazil	2:53.95	
6	7	Lenka Zahradnikova	Czech Republic	3:00.19	
7	1	Nicole Frycova	Czech Republic	3:04.92	

==== Heat 2 ====
Rank	Lane	Name	Nationality	Time	Notes
1	2	Natali Pronina	Azerbaijan	2:36.75	Q
2	4	Oxana Savchenko	Russia	2:38.13	Q
3	5	Joanna Mendak	Poland	2:39.98	Q
4	6	Carla Casals	Spain	2:42.48	Q
5	3	Amaya Alonso	Spain	2:44.63	Q
6	7	Karina Petrikovičová	Slovakia	3:02.83	
7	1	Matilde Alcázar	Mexico	3:07.19	

=== Final ===
Competed at 19:16.

Rank	Lane	Name	Nationality	Time	Notes
1st place, gold medalist(s)	5	Oxana Savchenko	Russia	2:28.00	WR
2nd place, silver medalist(s)	4	Natali Pronina	Azerbaijan	2:28.45	
3rd place, bronze medalist(s)	3	Darya Stukalova	Russia	2:28.73	
4	6	Joanna Mendak	Poland	2:35.38	
5	8	Amaya Alonso	Spain	2:38.78	
6	2	Deborah Font	Spain	2:39.65	
7	1	Yaryna Matlo	Ukraine	2:41.91	
8	7	Carla Casals	Spain	2:44.09	

'Q = qualified for final. WR = World Record.
