= Archery at the 2012 Summer Paralympics – Women's individual compound =

Women's individual compound open at the XIV Paralympic Games
- Paralympic Archery
- Venue: The Royal Artillery Barracks
- Competitors: 12 from 8 nations

Medalists
1st place, gold medalist(s)		Danielle Brown	Great Britain
2nd place, silver medalist(s)		Mel Clarke	Great Britain
3rd place, bronze medalist(s)		Stepanida Artakhinova	Russia

The Women's individual compound open is one of the events held in archery at the 2012 Summer Paralympics in London.

== Results ==
=== Ranking round ===
Rank	Target/Back No.	Archer	Score
1	22A	Danielle Brown (GBR)	676
2	21B	Stepanida Artakhinova (RUS)	672
3	23A	Mel Clarke (GBR)	648
4	22B	Maria Lyzhnikova (RUS)	647
5	24C	Kseniya Markitantova (UKR)	645
6	22C	Karen van Nest (CAN)	643
7	24A	Zandra Reppe (SWE)	642
8	21A	Pippa Britton (GBR)	641
9	21C	Maria Rubio Larrion (ESP)	637
10	23B	Olga Polegaeva (RUS)	631
11	24B	Miho Nagano (JPN)	614
12	23C	Gülbin Su (TUR)	613

=== Competition bracket ===
==== Finals ====
Semi-finals
1	Danielle Brown (GBR)	6
4	Maria Lyzhnikova (RUS)	2
3	Mel Clarke (GBR)	6
2	Stepanida Artakhinova (RUS)	0

Finals
1	Danielle Brown (GBR)	6
3	Mel Clarke (GBR)	4
Third place
4	Maria Lyzhnikova (RUS)	3
2	Stepanida Artakhinova (RUS)	7

==== Section 1 ====
Round of 16			Quarter-finals			Semi-finals
			1	Danielle Brown (GBR)	6
8	Pippa Britton (GBR)	4	9	Maria Rubio Larrion (ESP)	4
9	Maria Rubio Larrion (ESP)	6				1	Danielle Brown (GBR)	6
5	Kseniya Markitantova (UKR)	4				4	Maria Lyzhnikova (RUS)	2
12	Gülbin Su (TUR)	6	12	Gülbin Su (TUR)	0
			4	Maria Lyzhnikova (RUS)	6

==== Section 2 ====
Round of 16			Quarter-finals			Semi-finals
			3	Mel Clarke (GBR)	6
11	Miho Nagano (JPN)	6	11	Miho Nagano (JPN)	4
6	Karen van Nest (CAN)	5				3	Mel Clarke (GBR)	6
7	Zandra Reppe (SWE)	4				2	Stepanida Artakhinova (RUS)	0
10	Olga Polegaeva (RUS)	6	10	Olga Polegaeva (RUS)	0
			2	Stepanida Artakhinova (RUS)	6
