= Archery at the 2008 Summer Paralympics – Women's individual compound =

Women's individual compound open at the XIII Paralympic Games
- Paralympic Archery
- Venue: Olympic Green Archery Field
- Competitors: 8 from 5 nations

Medalists
1st place, gold medalist(s)		Danielle Brown	Great Britain
2nd place, silver medalist(s)		Chieko Kamiya	Japan
3rd place, bronze medalist(s)		Melanie Clarke	Great Britain

The Women's individual compound open was one of the events held in archery at the 2008 Summer Paralympics in Beijing.

The competition began with a ranking round, to determine the pairings in the next stage. Britain's Danielle Brown ranked first, setting a world record with 676 points, and was consequently paired against China's Wang Li, who ranked lowest with 551 points. Sweden's Zandra Reppe, second with 658 points was paired against Japan's Chieko Kamiya, seventh with 627 points. Turkey's Gülbin Su (650) was paired against Sweden's Ann-Christin Nilsson (641), while Britain's Melanie Clarke (647) and Pippa Britton (643) were paired against each other.

In the quarter-finals, the highest ranked archer defeated her opponent in three of the pairs. Brown defeated Wang 107:81; Clarke beat Britton 110:106; and Su beat Nilsson 112:102. But Kamiya narrowly defeated Reppe 107:106 to advance to the semi-finals.

In the semis, Clarke again found herself against a fellow Briton, Brown, who set a Paralympic record by defeating her 113:107. In the other semi-final, Kamiya again advanced by a very narrow margin, beating Su 106:104. Clarke then won the bronze medal match by beating Su 113:109.

In the final, Danielle Brown took the gold medal, defeating Chieko Kamiya with the convincing score of 112:98. It was Brown's first participation in the Paralympic Games, at the age of 22; she later qualified to compete for England in the able-bodied archery competition at the 2010 Commonwealth Games.

== Ranking Round ==
Rank	Archer	Score	10's	X's	Notes
1	Danielle Brown (GBR)	676	34	13	WR
2	Zandra Reppe (SWE)	658	26	10	
3	Gülbin Su (TUR)	650	19	11	
4	Mel Clarke (GBR)	647	21	8	
5	Pippa Britton (GBR)	643	24	11	
6	Ann-Christin Nilsson (SWE)	641	23	5	
7	Chieko Kamiya (JPN)	627	17	5	
8	Wang Li (CHN)	551	6	3	

== Competition bracket ==
Quarter-finals
Danielle Brown (GBR)	107
Wang Li (CHN)	81
Pippa Britton (GBR)	106
Mel Clarke (GBR)	110
Gülbin Su (TUR)	112
Ann-Christin Nilsson (SWE)	102
Chieko Kamiya (JPN)	107
Zandra Reppe (SWE)	106

Semi-finals
Danielle Brown (GBR)	113
Mel Clarke (GBR)	107
Gülbin Su (TUR)	104
Chieko Kamiya (JPN)	106

Final
Danielle Brown (GBR)	112
Chieko Kamiya (JPN)	98
Third place
Mel Clarke (GBR)	113
Gülbin Su (TUR)	109
