= Swimming at the 2012 Summer Paralympics – Women's 400 metre freestyle S12 =

Paralympic event for women with visual impairments

Women's 400 metre freestyle S12 at the XIV Paralympic Games
- Venue: London Aquatics Centre
- Dates: 30 August
- Competitors: 12 from 9 nations

Medalists
| 1st place, gold medalist(s) | | Oxana Savchenko | Russia |
| 2nd place, silver medalist(s) | | Hannah Russell | Great Britain |
| 3rd place, bronze medalist(s) | | Deborah Font | Spain |

The women's 100 metre butterfly S12 event at the 2012 Paralympic Games took place on 2 September, at the London Aquatics Centre in the Olympic Park, London. The event was for athletes included in the S12 classification, which is for competitors with visual impairments. Twelve swimmers took part, representing a total of nine different nations. Russia's Oxana Savchenko won the gold medal.

== Results ==
=== Heats ===
Two heats were held, each with six swimmers; the swimmers with the eight fastest times advanced to the final. The heats took place on 30 August starting at 10:03 BST. Great Britain's Hannah Russell won the first heat in a time of 4 minutes 41.25 seconds and was the fastest qualifier for the final. The second heat was won by Deborah Font of Spain who finished in a time of 4 minutes 46.72 seconds.

Key

- Q Qualified for next round

==== Heat 1 ====
| Rank | Lane | Name | Nationality | Time | Notes |
|---|---|---|---|---|---|
| 1 | 4 | Hannah Russell | Great Britain | 4:41.25 | Q |
| 2 | 3 | Amaya Alonso | Spain | 4:53.07 | Q |
| 3 | 5 | Anna Efimenko | Russia | 4:57.33 | Q |
| 4 | 2 | Natali Pronina | Azerbaijan | 4:58.06 | Q |
| 5 | 6 | Raquel Viel | Brazil | 5:29.46 | |
| 6 | 7 | Nicole Frycova | Czech Republic | 6:18.30 | |

==== Heat 2 ====
| Rank | Lane | Name | Nationality | Time | Notes |
|---|---|---|---|---|---|
| 1 | 4 | Deborah Font | Spain | 4:46.72 | Q |
| 2 | 6 | Oxana Savchenko | Russia | 4:48.10 | Q |
| 3 | 5 | Naomi Maike Schnittger | Germany | 4:58.93 | Q |
| 4 | 3 | Yuliya Volkova | Ukraine | 5:06.66 | Q |
| 5 | 7 | Lenka Zahradnikova | Czech Republic | 5:44.43 | |
| 6 | 2 | Matilde Estefania Alcazar Figueroa | Mexico | 5:49.15 | |

=== Final ===
The final was held on 30 August at 17:57 BST. Russia's Oxana Savchenko, swimming in lane 3, won the gold medal in a time of 4 minutes 37.89 seconds, finishing less than a second ahead of the 16-year-old British silver medallist Hannah Russell. Spain's Deborah Font was a further 1.15 seconds back in the bronze medal position.

| Rank | Lane | Name | Nationality | Time | Notes |
|---|---|---|---|---|---|
| 1st place, gold medalist(s) | 3 | Oxana Savchenko | Russia | 4:37.89 | |
| 2nd place, silver medalist(s) | 4 | Hannah Russell | Great Britain | 4:38.60 | |
| 3rd place, bronze medalist(s) | 5 | Deborah Font | Spain | 4:39.75 | |
| 4 | 2 | Anna Efimenko | Russia | 4:51.29 | |
| 5 | 7 | Natali Pronina | Azerbaijan | 4:53.40 | |
| 6 | 6 | Amaya Alonso | Spain | 4:53.59 | |
| 7 | 1 | Naomi Maike Schnittger | Germany | 4:56.38 | |
| 8 | 8 | Yuliya Volkova | Ukraine | 5:00.18 | |
