= Gülbin Su =

Turkish Paralympic archer (born 1971)

Personal information
- Nationality: Turkish
- Born: 7 June 1971 (age 55) Samandağ, Hatay, Turkey

Sport
- Country: Turkey
- Sport: Para-archery
- Event: Compound bow

Achievements and titles
- Paralympic finals: 4th (2008)
Medal record
Women's archery Compound bow
Representing Turkey
World Para Archery Championships
| Bronze medal – third place | 2007 Cheongju | Individual |
European Para-Archery Championships
| Bronze medal – third place | 2014 Nottwil | Open Team |
| Silver medal – second place | 2006 Nymburk | Individual |

Gülbin Su (born 7 June 1971) is a Turkish Paralympic archer competing in the women's Compound bow event.

== Early years ==
Gülbin Su was born to an Arab Alawite family in Samandağ district of Hatay Province on 7 June 1971. She is disabled due to her contraction with poliomyelitis at age of three.

She graduated in Job Training from the Faculty of Education at Ağrı İbrahim Çeçen University. She lives in Reyhanlı, Hatay, where she works as a painting teacher in an elementary school.

== Sporting career ==
Su began with archery in 2002 by chance while she was waiting at a bus stop. She was contacted by the national team coach, who was passing by. The next day, she accepted the offer. Su debuted internationally in 2006. She competes with compound bow and shoots right-handed.

In 2006, she took the silver medal at the 4th EPC Archery Championships held in Nymburk, Czech Republic.

She won the bronze medal at the 2007 World Para-archery Championships in Cheongju, South Korea.

She took part at the 2008 Summer Paralympics representing Turkey at the Women's individual compound event. She set a Paralympic record in the quarterfinals, and placed the fourth ranking after losing to Mel Clarke from England in the third place game.

In 2009, she became champion at the "Monda Villa" Tournamebt.

Su competed at the 2012 London Paralympics and lost to Russian Maria Lyzhnikova in the quarterfinals.

She won the bronze medal with her teammates Burcu Dağ and Handan Biroğlu in the Compound Women Open Team event at the 2014 European Para Archery Championships held in Nottwil, Switzerland.
