= Swimming at the 2012 Summer Paralympics – Women's 100 metre breaststroke SB8 =

Women's 100m Breaststroke SB8 at the XIV Paralympic Games
- Venue: London Aquatics Centre
- Dates: 1 September
- Competitors: 10 from 9 nations
- Winning time: 1:17.17

Medalists
1st place, gold medalist(s)		Olesya Vladykina	Russia
2nd place, silver medalist(s)		Claire Cashmore	Great Britain
3rd place, bronze medalist(s)		Paulina Wozniak	Poland

The women's 100m breaststroke SB8 event at the 2012 Summer Paralympics took place at the London Aquatics Centre on 1 September. There were two heats; the swimmers with the eight fastest times advanced to the final.

== Results ==
=== Heats ===
Competed from 10:37.

==== Heat 1 ====
Rank	Lane	Name	Nationality	Time	Notes
1	4	Claire Cashmore	Great Britain	1:22.90	Q
2	5	Paulina Wozniak	Poland	1:24.45	Q
3	3	Katarina Roxon	Canada	1:28.84	Q
4	6	Manami Nomura	Japan	1:32.82	Q
5	2	Nikita Howarth	New Zealand	1:33.48	OC

==== Heat 2 ====
Rank	Lane	Name	Nationality	Time	Notes
1	4	Olesya Vladykina	Russia	1:23.12	Q
2	5	Anna Johannes	United States	1:23.66	Q
3	2	Anna Kolosova	Russia	1:26.29	Q
4	3	Natalie du Toit	South Africa	1:30.24	Q
5	6	Katerina Komarkova	Czech Republic	1:36.11	

=== Final ===
Competed at 18:29.

Rank	Lane	Name	Nationality	Time	Notes
1st place, gold medalist(s)	5	Olesya Vladykina	Russia	1:17.17	WR
2nd place, silver medalist(s)	4	Claire Cashmore	Great Britain	1:20.39	
3rd place, bronze medalist(s)	6	Paulina Wozniak	Poland	1:22.45	
4	3	Anna Johannes	United States	1:23.45	
5	7	Katarina Roxon	Canada	1:27.07	
6	2	Anna Kolosova	Russia	1:27.58	
7	1	Natalie du Toit	South Africa	1:30.85	
8	8	Manami Nomura	Japan	1:31.19	

'Q = qualified for final. WR = World Record. OC = Oceania Record.
