= Swimming at the 2012 Summer Paralympics – Men's 200 metre individual medley SM12 =

Event at the 2012 Summer Paralympics

Men's 200m Ind. Medley SM12 at the XIV Paralympic Games
- Venue: London Aquatics Centre
- Dates: 3 September 2012
- Competitors: 12 from 7 nations
- Winning time: 2:12.42

Medalists
1st place, gold medalist(s)		Maksym Veraksa	Ukraine
2nd place, silver medalist(s)		Aleksandr Nevolin-Svetov	Russia
3rd place, bronze medalist(s)		Sergey Punko	Russia

The men's 200m ind. medley SM12 event at the 2012 Summer Paralympics took place at the London Aquatics Centre on 3 September. There were two heats; the swimmers with the eight fastest times advanced to the final.

== Results ==
=== Heats ===
Competed from 11:05.

==== Heat 1 ====
Rank	Lane	Name	Nationality	Time	Notes
1	4	Aleksandr Nevolin-Svetov	Russia	2:15.21	Q
2	5	Enrique Floriano	Spain	2:16.19	Q
3	3	Fabrizio Sottile	Italy	2:21.75	Q
4	6	Daniel Giraldo Correa	Colombia	2:27.07	
5	2	Oleg Tkalienko	Ukraine	2:30.65	
6	7	Jose Ramon Cantero Elvira	Spain	2:32.69	

==== Heat 2 ====
Rank	Lane	Name	Nationality	Time	Notes
1	4	Maksym Veraksa	Ukraine	2:14.91	Q
2	3	Sergii Klippert	Ukraine	2:16.35	Q
3	5	Sergey Punko	Russia	2:20.29	Q
4	6	Ignacio Gonzalez	Argentina	2:20.76	Q
5	2	Daniel Simon	Germany	2:24.19	Q
6	7	Mikhail Zimin	Russia	2:34.35	

=== Final ===
Competed at 19:07.

Rank	Lane	Name	Nationality	Time	Notes
1st place, gold medalist(s)	4	Maksym Veraksa	Ukraine	2:12.42	PR
2nd place, silver medalist(s)	5	Aleksandr Nevolin-Svetov	Russia	2:14.45	
3rd place, bronze medalist(s)	2	Sergey Punko	Russia	2:14.83	
4	6	Sergii Klippert	Ukraine	2:15.30	
5	3	Enrique Floriano	Spain	2:16.18	
6	7	Ignacio Gonzalez	Argentina	2:20.73	
7	8	Daniel Simon	Germany	2:20.86	
8	1	Fabrizio Sottile	Italy	2:21.92	

Q = qualified for final. PR = Paralympic Record.
