= Powerlifting at the 2012 Summer Paralympics – Men's 52 kg =

Powerlifting – Men's 52 kg at the XIV Paralympic Games
- Venue: ExCeL London
- Date: 31 August 2012
- Competitors: 11 from 11 nations
- Winning lift: 176 kg

Medalists
1st place, gold medalist(s)		Qi Feng	China
2nd place, silver medalist(s)		Ikechukwu Obichukwu	Nigeria
3rd place, bronze medalist(s)		Vladimir Krivulya	Russia

The men's 52 kg powerlifting event at the 2012 Summer Paralympics was contested on 31 August 2012 at ExCeL London.

== Records ==
Prior to the competition, the existing world and Paralympic records were as follows.

World record	191.0 kg	Sherif Othman (EGY)	Dubai, United Arab Emirates	28 March 2010
Paralympic record	190.0 kg	Keum Jung Jong (KOR)	Sydney, Australia	24 October 2000

== Results ==
Rank	Name	Group	Body weight (kg)	Attempts (kg)				Result (kg)
Rank	Name	Group	Body weight (kg)	1	2	3	4	Result (kg)
1st place, gold medalist(s)	Qi Feng (CHN)	A	51.93	169.0	175.0	176.0	–	176.0
2nd place, silver medalist(s)	Ikechukwu Obichukwu (NGR)	A	51.17	171.0	~~174.0~~	175.0	–	175.0
3rd place, bronze medalist(s)	Vladimir Krivulya (RUS)	A	51.52	~~166.0~~	169.0	175.0	–	175.0
4	Binh An Nguyen (VIE)	A	51.14	163.0	~~168.0~~	~~169.0~~	–	163.0
5	Alidou Diamoutene (CIV)	A	51.55	~~160.0~~	160.0	~~165.0~~	–	160.0
6	Hussein Juboori (IRQ)	A	51.61	160.0	~~165.0~~	~~170.0~~	–	160.0
7	Choochat Sukjarern (THA)	B	51.36	~~152.0~~	152.0	~~157.0~~	–	152.0
8	Mekan Agalikov (TKM)	B	50.75	~~150.0~~	~~150.0~~	150.0	–	150.0
9	Cesar Rubio Guerra (CUB)	B	50.93	143.0	~~148.0~~	~~148.0~~	–	143.0
10	Esen Kaliev (KGZ)	B	51.64	140.0	141.0	~~152.0~~	–	141.0
–	Agustin Kitan (PHI)	B	51.81	~~148.0~~	~~148.0~~	~~148.0~~	–	NMR
