= Vladimir Krivulya =

Russian Paralympic powerlifter

Sport
- Country: Russia
- Sport: Paralympic powerlifting
- Weight class: 54 kg
Medal record
Paralympic Games
Bronze medal – third place	2012 London	52 kg
World Championships
Gold medal – first place	2019 Nur-Sultan	54 kg
Silver medal – second place	2014 Dubai	54 kg

Vladimir Krivulya is a Russian Paralympic powerlifter. He represented Russia at the 2012 Summer Paralympics held in London, United Kingdom and he won the bronze medal in the men's 52 kg event.

At the 2014 World Championships he won the silver medal in the men's 54 kg event. At the 2019 World Championships he won the gold medal in this event.
