= Oxana Savchenko =

Russian Paralympic swimmer

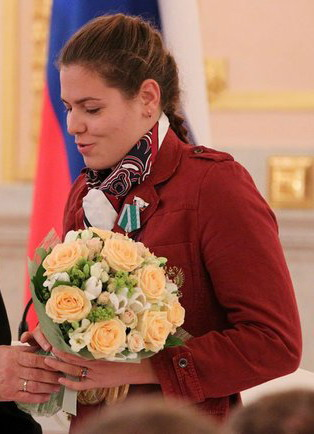
- Savchenko in 2012

Personal information
- Nationality: Russian
- Born: 10 October 1990 (age 35) Petropavlovsk-Kamchatskiy

Sport
- Sport: Swimming
- Strokes: Freestyle
- Classifications: S12
Medal record
Women's para-athletics
Representing Russia
Paralympic Games
| Gold medal – first place | 2008 Beijing | 50 m freestyle - S12 |
| Gold medal – first place | 2008 Beijing | 100 m freestyle - S12 |
| Gold medal – first place | 2008 Beijing | 200 m individual medley - SM12 |
| Gold medal – first place | 2012 London | 400 m freestyle - S12 |
| Gold medal – first place | 2012 London | 200 m individual medley - SM12 |
| Gold medal – first place | 2012 London | 100 m freestyle - S12 |
| Gold medal – first place | 2012 London | 100 m backstroke - S12 |
| Gold medal – first place | 2012 London | 50 m freestyle - S12 |
IPC European Championships
| Gold medal – first place | 2009 Reykjavik | 100 m freestyle SM13 |
| Silver medal – second place | 2009 Reykjavik | 50 m freestyle SM13 |
| Silver medal – second place | 2009 Reykjavik | 200 m medley SM13 |

Oxana Savchenko (Russian: Оксана Владимировна Савченко; born 10 October 1990) is a paralympic swimmer from Russia. She competes in category S12 events for visually impaired competitors.

Oxana was one of the stars of the Russian team at the 2008 Summer Paralympics. She won gold in all three of her events. She won gold in the 200 metres (660 ft) individual medley and set a new world record in winning both the 50 metres (160 ft) and 100 metres (330 ft) freestyle events.

== Awards ==
- Order of Honor (30 September 2009)
- Order of Friendship (10 September 2012)
- Order of Salavat Yulaev
- Order of Friendship of Peoples
- Laureate of the National Award of Public Recognition of Women's Achievements "Olympia" of the Russian Academy of Business and Entrepreneurship in 2012.
