= Natali Pronina =

Azerbaijani Paralympic swimmer (born 1987)

- Natali Pronina at the 2012 Summer Paralympics

Personal information
- Full name: Nataliya Aleksandrovna Filina
- Nationality: Azerbaijan
- Born: 12 August 1987 (age 39) Baku, Azerbaijan SSR, Soviet Union
- Height: 1.67 m (5 ft 6 in)
- Weight: 62 kg (137 lb)

Sport
- Sport: Paralympic swimming S12, Breaststroke
- Event: Women's 50 metre Freestyle – S12, Women's 100 metre Freestyle S12, Women's 400 metre Freestyle S12, Women's 100 metre Breaststroke – SB12, Women's 100 metre Backstroke – S12, Women's 200 metre individual medley – SM12
Medal record
Representing Azerbaijan
Paralympic Games
Swimming
Gold medal – first place	2012 London	100m breaststroke SB12
Silver medal – second place	2012 London	200m individual medley SM12
Silver medal – second place	2012 London	100m freestyle S12
Silver medal – second place	2012 London	100m backstroke S12
Silver medal – second place	2012 London	50m freestyle S12

Natali Pronina, also known as Nataliya Aleksandrovna Filina (born 12 August 1987) is an Azerbaijani Olympic and Paralympic swimmer. She swam for Azerbaijan at the 2004 Summer Olympics, and also in three editions of the World Championships (2003, 2005, and 2009). She also won one gold and four silver medals in the 2012 Summer Paralympics in London, United Kingdom, making her Azerbaijan's most successful athlete of the games.

== Personal life ==
Natali Pronina was born on 12 August 1987 in Baku. She is married to Jasur Rajabli.

== Career ==
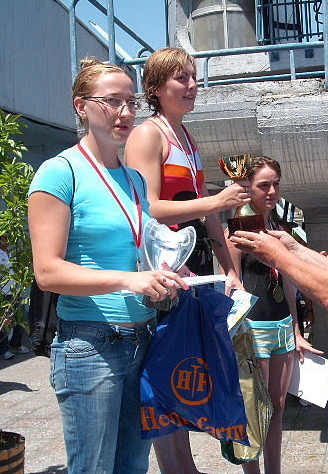
Filina (left) in 2009

During the 2003 World Aquatics Championships in Barcelona, she placed 42nd in the Women's 50 metre breaststroke, 47th in the Women's 100 metre breaststroke and 41st in the Women's 200 metre breaststroke.

Under the name Natalya Filina, she qualified for the women's 100 m breaststroke at the 2004 Summer Olympics in Athens, by receiving a Universality place from FINA, in an entry time of 1:19.49. She challenged seven other swimmers in heat one, including Bolivia's Katerine Moreno, who competed at her third Olympics since 1988. She raced to fourth place by nearly a two-second margin behind winner Moreno in 1:20.21. Filina failed to advance into the semi-finals, as she placed forty-fourth overall in the preliminaries.

The following year, at the 2005 World Aquatics Championships, she was in 46th place in the Women's 100 metre breaststroke. In 2009, Pronina placed 93rd and 103rd in the Women's 50 metre freestyle and the Women's 100 metre freestyle.

Pronina was one of 22 athletes selected to represent Azerbaijan at the 2012 Summer Paralympics in London. At the games, Pronina was the most successful of her country's competitors, winning half of Azerbaijan's total medals. She won a gold medal and broke the world record in the Women's 100m breaststroke SB12 in 1:16.17. In addition, Pronina won four silver medals in the Women's 50m Freestyle S12, the Women's 100m Backstroke S12, the Women's 100m Freestyle S12 and the Women's 200m Individual Medley SM12.

Pronina founded the organisation "Stand United, Win Together" with her husband to encourage children and communities to be involved with sports.In an interview with Idman.biz, she expressed her aim for every Azerbaijani child to have access to and the opportunity to play sports.
