= Danielle Brown =

English competitive archer

Danielle Brown MBE
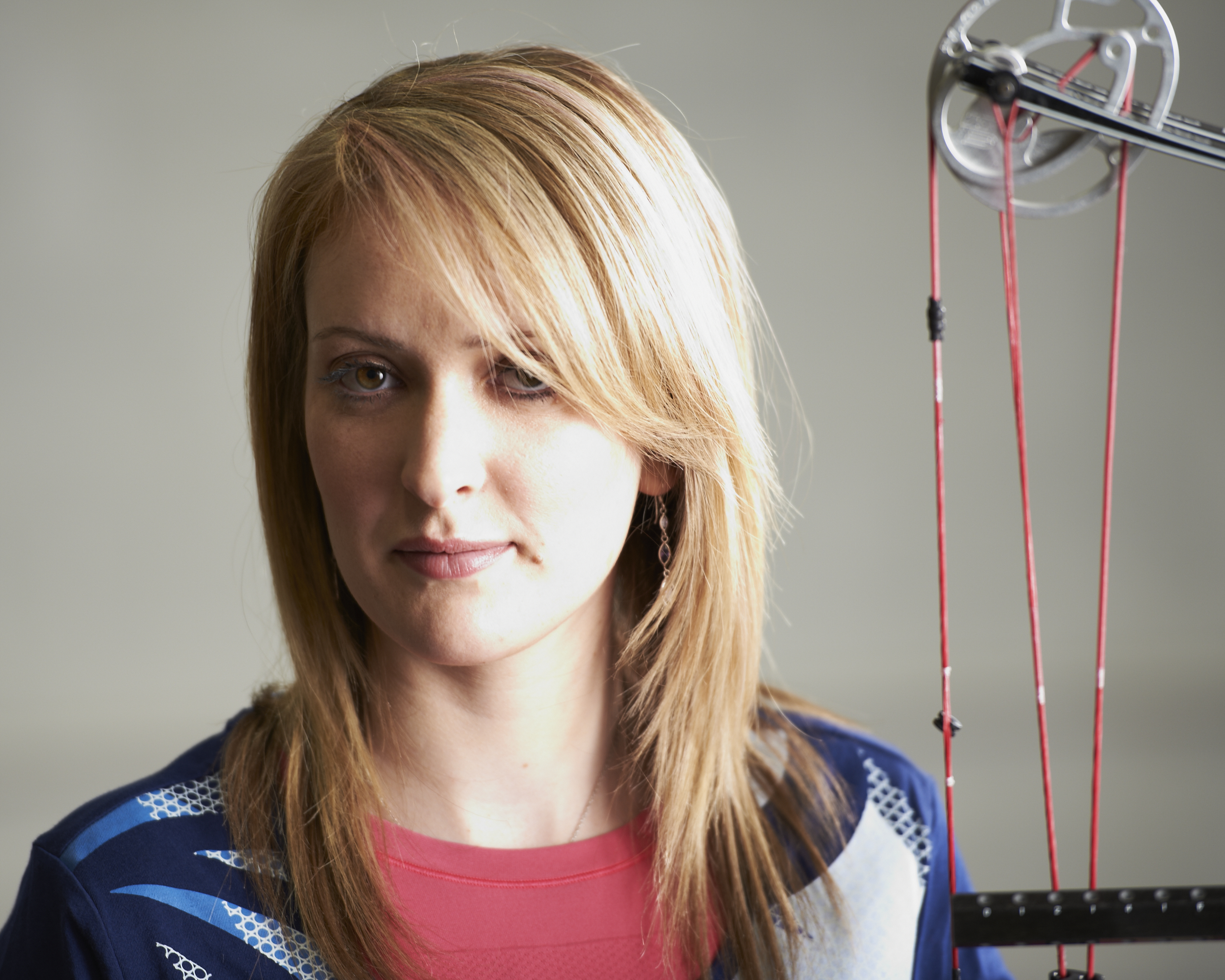
- Brown in 2012

Personal information
- Born: 10 April 1988 (age 38) Steeton, West Yorkshire, England
- Website: www.daniellebrown.co.uk
Medal record
Archery
Representing Great Britain
Paralympic Games
Gold medal – first place	2008 Beijing	Women's individual compound
Gold medal – first place	2012 London	Women's individual compound
Representing England
Commonwealth Games
Gold medal – first place	2010 Delhi	Women's compound team

Danielle Brown MBE (born 10 April 1988) is a British competitive archer and award winning children's author. She competed in the Paralympic Games, winning gold medals in Beijing 2008 and London 2012, and has also won medals shooting in the able-bodied category, including at the Commonwealth Games.

She was born in Steeton, West Yorkshire.

== Career ==
Her first international competitive event was at the European Archery Championships (for athletes with disabilities) in Nymburk in 2006. She reached the semi-finals of the Compound Bow Open Class event, and was defeated by Gulbin Su of Turkey. She lost the bronze medal match to fellow British competitor Melanie Clarke.

She then took part in the IPC World Archery Championships in Cheongju in 2007. Competing in the Compound Bow Open Class event, she won gold with a score of 114 points (defeating Gulbin Su 116–107 in the semi-final, and Wang Li of China 114–108 in the final). She was also part of the British women's team which won gold in the team event in the Compound Bow Open Class, defeating Japan 221–199 in the final.

In 2008, Brown won silver (beaten by Gulbin Su in the final) in the Invitation Disabled Archery Event in Stoke Mandeville, then competed at the Paralympic Games in Beijing, where she won gold in the Women's individual compound, defeating Wang in the quarter-finals, Clarke in the semis, and Chieko Kamiya of Japan in the final (112–98). In 2009, she won a second successive individual gold medal, and a team gold, at the IPC World Archery Championships, followed in 2010 by three successive individual gold medals: at the Arizona Cup, at the Stoke Mandeville World Invitational Disabled Archery Competition, and at the European Para-Archery Championships.

She represented England in archery at the 2010 Commonwealth Games in Delhi, having qualified "after a two-day selection shoot in Coventry in June where she finished second behind world number one Nicky Hunt". She was "the first Paralympian to represent England in an able-bodied event at the Games", though cyclist Sarah Storey (who won two gold medals in cycling at the 2008 Paralympics) also competed against able-bodied athletes a few days later. She won a gold medal in the Women's Team Compound event, beating Canada 232–229 alongside team-mates Nicky Hunt and Nichola Simpson.

In 2011, she won an additional individual gold medal at the IPC World Championships in Turin, followed by two silver medals in the women's team event and the mixed team event.

In 2012, she won her second successive Paralympic Games gold medal, beating GB teammate Mel Clarke in the final at the Royal Artillery Barracks, London. That year she also won the Indoor World Cup in Nimes and got a silver medal at the World Cup Finals in Tokyo, both in the able-bodied category.

Brown was appointed Member of the Order of the British Empire (MBE) in the 2013 New Year Honours for services to archery. She also had a postbox painted gold after the London Paralympics

On 1 September 2013 Brown won the able-bodied British title with victory at the Archery GB National Series finals in Nottingham. She beat Lucy O'Sullivan 142–141 in the compound final.

In November 2013, World Archery announced that Brown would not be able to compete in Para-Archery contests (such as the 2016 Olympics) in the future as her disability did not have a direct and important impact on her archery performance. She appealed the ruling, but it was upheld in favour of World Archery. As of 1 April 2014, she is unable to compete in Para-Archery.

Brown competed at the 2015 able-bodied World Championships in Copenhagen. In 2017 she appeared on Christmas University Challenge on a team representing Leicester University.

== Personal life ==
Brown has complex regional pain syndrome (CRPS) in her feet, and competes sitting on a stool. She was, at the time of the 2008 Paralympics, a law student at Leicester University, and subsequently achieved first-class honours. She was given an honorary degree of Doctors of Laws from the University of Leicester on Friday 25 January 2013 On 19 September 2013 Leicester University named the Danielle Brown Sports Centre after her. On 22 September 2013 Brown was made a Freewoman of the Craven District and on 1 July 2014 Brown was given the Freedom of the City of London. In 2019, Brown was inducted into the British University and College Sport's Hall of Fame. On 26 May 2022, Brown won the Sunday Times Children's Sports Book of the Year award for her book Run Like a Girl.

== Bibliography ==
- Collins GCSE Revision Study Skills (2015)
- Be Your Best Self - Life Skills For Unstoppable Kids (2019)
- Run Like A Girl - 50 Extraordinary And Inspiring Sportswomen (2021)
- One Hundred Reasons To Hope (2021), curated on behalf of Captain Tom Moore.
- Girls Rule - 50 Women Who Changed The World (2023)
- Shoot for the Stars - A Kickass Guide to Finding Confidence in Sport (2025)

== Achievements ==
2006
4th, European Para Championships, individual, Nymburk
2007
(gold) IPC World Championships, individual, Cheongju
(gold) IPC World Championships, women's team, Cheongju
2008
(silver) World Invitational Disabled Competition, individual, Stoke Mandeville
(gold) Summer Paralympics, individual, Beijing
2009
(gold) IPC World Championships, women's team, Nymburk
(gold) IPC World Championships, individual, Nymburk
12th, Summer Universiade, individual, Belgrade
2010
(gold) Arizona Cup, individual, Phoenix, Arizona
(silver) Arizona Cup, mixed team, Phoenix, Arizona
(bronze) Arizona Cup, women's team, Phoenix, Arizona
(gold) World Invitational Disabled Competition, individual, Stoke Mandeville
(gold) European Para Championships, individual, Vichy
(gold) Commonwealth Games, women's team, Delhi
(bronze) World Cup, women's team, Shanghai

2011
(gold) IPC World Championships, individual, Turin
(silver) IPC World Championships, women's team, Turin
(silver) IPC World Championships, mixed team, Turin
2012
(gold) Nimes Indoor World Cup – able bodied, Nimes, France
(silver) Arizona Cup, women's team, Phoenix, Arizona
(bronze) World Cup, mixed team, Shanghai
(gold) 2012 Summer Paralympics, individual, London
(silver) World Cup Final – able bodied, individual, Tokyo
2013
(gold) UK National Series Champion, able-bodied, Nottingham

4th World Championships, women's team, able-bodied, Belek

(silver) IPC World Championships, individual, Bangkok
(silver) IPC World Championships, mixed team, Bangkok

2022
(gold) Children's Sports Book of the Year, Sunday Times Sports Book Awards: Run Like A Girl

== See also ==
- 2012 Summer Olympics and Paralympics gold post boxes
