= Pippa Britton =

British retired paralympic archer

Pippa Britton OBE
Personal information
- National team: Great Britain
- Born: 26 May 1963 (age 63) Surrey, England or Newport, Monmouthshire, Wales
- Website: www.pippabritton.co.uk

Sport
- Sport: Archery
- Disability: Spina Bifida
- Retired: 2015

Pippa Britton OBE (born 26 May 1963) is a British retired archer and paralympian.

She is currently serving as vice-chair of the Sport Wales board and of the Aneurin Bevan University Health Board.

== Life and career ==
Britton was born in Surrey, England, She has had Spina bifida since her birth.

As a child, Britton was a swimmer and expressed her love for sport. At age 7, she stated she wanted to be a championship swimmer.

In the early 1990s, after being encouraged by her husband to take up something new, Britton first got involved with archery as a social activity following a "have a go" session. Britton took a six-week beginner archery course, and felt she "wasn't any good to start with" at the time. She commented how her disability limits which sports are available to her, but felt archery had members that were unceasingly willing to help and two archery clubs, the Neath Archers and Llantarnam Archery, helped her "feel really included".

In 1999, she qualified for the development squad, and in 2001 attended her first World Archery Championships.

She attended two Paralympic Games, Beijing 2008 and London 2012, although did not receive a medal at either.

Britton was a standing archer at the beginning of her archery career, but later started to sit on a stool and then became a wheelchair user. Especially following two major spinal surgeries in the middle of her career.

She competed as part of the Welsh and British archery teams for 15 years, during which she won a place on the podium in six World Championships and 24 international events. She has gained eleven world records during her career, and also represented the Welsh able-bodied team, on more than 20 occasions. Disability archery events she's participated in include the World Para Archery Championship, European Para-Archery Championships and Paralympic Games. During her competitive career she also was a coach and mentor to development squad athletes. Britton was the first para-archery member of the World Archery athletes' committee when her membership began in 2011.

She retired in 2015, following an injury which forced her to retire, and she later moved into a career on managing sport. In the same year, she was re-elected for another term as a para-archery member of the World Archery athletes' committee, with the term lasting until 2019.

In April 2016, Britton claimed British Airways had lost her wheelchair, which she claimed was found in Geneva before returned to Heathrow. Britton said the ordeal left her stranded, as she needed it for her personal independence, and "in tears". She described the situation as "unacceptable" on Twitter.

In June 2016, as chair of Disability Sport Wales, she awarded Newport Live and Newport City Council an award recognising Newport's support of disabled people. As of 2023, she lives in Newport. She also served as the director of Elephant in the Room, a company specialising in mentoring services, and disability awareness training for businesses and schools.

She was appointed as a member of the International Paralympic Committee's anti-doping committee in September 2018. Britton currently serves as vice-chair of the Sport Wales board and as a vice-chair (since July 2023) and independent member of the Aneurin Bevan University Health Board.

As of August 2023, she is a member of the Sports Honours Committee, International Paralympic Committee, British Paralympic Association Classification Advisory Group, and the board of UK Anti-Doping (UKAD), the latter of which she was formerly its vice-chair. Britton is an alumnus of the UK Sport International Leadership Programme. Britton was chair of Disability Sport Wales, and formerly a member of the Archery GB board and Sport Wales Elite Sport Sub Group.

She is also currently a trustee at UWC Atlantic College, and was appointed and commenced as a board member of the Charity Commission Wales in September 2022. In October 2022, she stepped-down from her role as vice-chair of the UKAD board.

In June 2023, Britton was honoured as an Officer of the Order of the British Empire (OBE) in the 2023 Birthday Honours of Charles III for her services to sport. In July 2023, she was awarded an honorary fellowship by the University of South Wales.

== Competitive history ==
Event date(s)	Event	Team/Individual	Medals received	Individual ranking
9 September 2008 – 17 September 2008	2008 Summer Paralympics, Beijing, China	(United Kingdom) Great Britain	selected	5th
14 August 2009 – 22 August 2009	World Para Archery Championship, Nymburk, Czech Republic	Team	gold	4th
8 August 2010 – 14 August 2010	European Para-Archery Championships, Vichy, France	Individual	silver	2nd
8 August 2010 – 14 August 2010	European Para-Archery Championships, Vichy, France	Team	silver	
10 July 2011 – 17 July 2011	World Para Archery Championship, Turin, Italy	Team	silver	8th
30 August – 5 September 2012	2012 Summer Paralympics, London, United Kingdom	(United Kingdom) Great Britain	selected	9th

Source: World Archery
