= Mel Clarke =

English Paralympic archer

Medal record

Archery

Representing Great Britain

Paralympic Games
Silver medal – second place	2012 London	Individual compound
Bronze medal – third place	2008 Beijing	Individual compound

Mel Clarke (born 2 September 1982) is an English competitive archer.

== Personal life ==
Clarke was born on 2 September 1982 in Norwich, Norfolk, England.

Since the age of 11 she has used a wheelchair because of a dance she did, she landed on her knee and it paralysed her. In 2003 Lyme disease caused her to lose sight in one eye.

== Archery ==
Clarke first tried archery as a member of the Girl Guides in 1998. She took part in her first international competition in 2002.

In 2003, she became the first disabled archer from Europe to take part in an able-bodied event at international level, however it was during this event that she contracted Lyme disease. She lost sight in her aiming eye and had to remodel her shooting style to compensate, developing a stance with her head tilted back to make best use of her working eye.

At the 2008 Summer Paralympics, held in Beijing, China, she won a bronze medal in the women's individual compound event. Having been defeated by fellow British competitor Danielle Brown in the semifinal with a score of 113–105, Clarke beat Turkey's Gulbin Su in the bronze playoff to win the medal.

In 2009, she won a gold medal in the team event and a silver in the individual at the World Championships held in the Czech Republic. She was overwhelmed 114-107 by teammate and reigning Paralympic Champion Danielle Brown in the final of the individual event.

In the 2010 European Championships Clarke did not rank highly in the individual event, but won a silver medal with the women's compound team. Teammates Danielle Brown and Pippa Britton won the individual gold and silver respectively. Clarke also failed to make the team for the 2011 World Championships, beaten to the mark by Danielle Brown, Pippa Britton and Sarah Beamish.

Clarke was selected to compete for Great Britain at the 2012 Summer Paralympics in London, United Kingdom. She took part in the women's individual compound event and advanced to the final to face compatriot Brown. The first two sets were tied before Brown won the third and Clarke the fourth to force a fifth set. Clarke was left needing to score a ten with her final arrow to take the match to a shoot-off, however she was unable to capitalise on this and scored a seven meaning she won the silver medal.
