= Anabel Moro =

Argentine Paralympic swimmer (born 1979)

Personal information
- Nickname: Ana
- Born: 27 June 1979 (age 47) Rosario, Argentina

Sport
- Country: Argentina
- Sport: Paralympic swimming
- Disability: Bilateral maculopathy
- Disability class: S12
- Event(s): Freestyle swimming Breaststroke
Medal record
Paralympic swimming
Representing Argentina
Parapan American Games
Gold medal – first place	2003 Mar del Plata	Women's 100m freestyle S12
Gold medal – first place	2003 Mar del Plata	Women's 400m freestyle S12
Gold medal – first place	2003 Mar del Plata	Women's 100m breaststroke SB12
Gold medal – first place	2011 Guadalajara	Women's 100m breaststroke SB13
Gold medal – first place	2015 Toronto	Women's 100m freestyle S12
Gold medal – first place	2015 Toronto	Women's 100m breaststroke SB13
Silver medal – second place	2011 Guadalajara	Women's 100m freestyle S12
Silver medal – second place	2015 Toronto	Women's 50m freestyle S12
Silver medal – second place	2019 Lima	Women's 4x100m freestyle relay 49pts
Bronze medal – third place	2015 Toronto	Women's 100m backstroke S13
World Championships
Bronze medal – third place	2006 Durban	Women's 100m breaststroke SB12
Bronze medal – third place	2017 Mexico City	Women's 100m breaststroke SB12

Anabel Moro (born 27 June 1979) is an Argentine Paralympic swimmer who competes in international level events. She is a multiple Parapan American medalist and has participated at the Summer Paralympics four times.

Moro began swimming when she was 9 years old. She began losing her sight due to Maculopathy when she was 14 years old.
