= Yaryna Matlo =

Ukrainian Paralympic swimmer

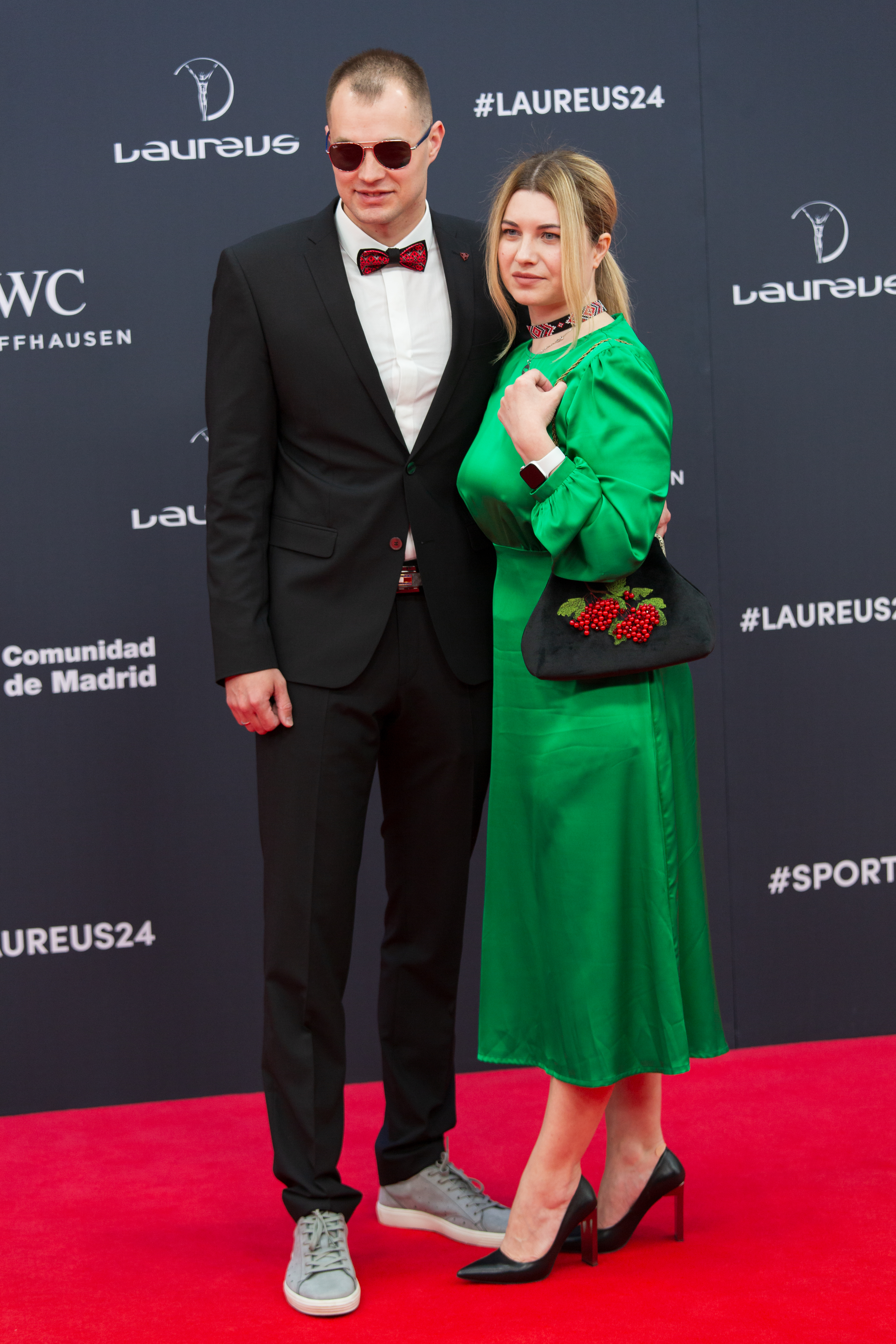
- Matlo with her husband Danylo Chufarov, 2024

Sport
- Sport: Swimming
- Classifications: S12

Yaryna Matlo is a Paralympic swimmer from Ukraine competing mainly in category S12 events.

Matlo competed as part of the Ukrainian Paralympic swimming team at the 2008 Summer Paralympics, where she won a bronze medal in the 100-metre (330 ft) breaststroke, finished eighth in the 100-metre (330 ft) butterfly but failed to make the final of the 200-metre (660 ft) individual medley.
