= Karina Petrikovičová =

Slovak Paralympic swimmer

Personal information
- Nickname: Kaja
- Born: 22 September 1993 (age 32) Piešťany, Slovakia

Sport
- Country: Slovakia
- Sport: Paralympic swimming
- Disability: Stargardt's disease
- Disability class: S12
Medal record
Paralympic swimming
Representing Slovakia
World Championships (LC)
Bronze medal – third place	2010 Eindhoven	100m backstroke S12
Bronze medal – third place	2013 Montreal	200m individual medley SM12
World Championships (SC)
Silver medal – second place	2009 Rio de Janeiro	100m backstroke S13
European Championships
Bronze medal – third place	2014 Eindhoven	100m backstroke S13
Bronze medal – third place	2016 Madeira	100m backstroke S13

Karina Petrikovičová (born 22 September 1993) is a Slovak Paralympic swimmer who competed at international swimming competitions. She is a World silver medalist and a two-time European bronze medalist, she has also competed at the 2008, 2012 and Slovakia at the 2016 Summer Paralympics.
