= Poland at the 2012 Summer Paralympics =

- IPC code: POL
- NPC: Polish Paralympic Committee
- Website: www.paralympic.org.pl

in London
- Competitors: 101 in 11 sports
- Flag bearer: Renata Chilewska
- Medals Ranked 9th: Gold 14 Silver 13 Bronze 9 Total 36

Summer Paralympics appearances (overview)
- 1972; 1976; 1980; 1984; 1988; 1992; 1996; 2000; 2004; 2008; 2012; 2016; 2020; 2024

Poland competed at the 2012 Summer Paralympics in London, United Kingdom, from 29 August to 9 September 2012.

== Medallists ==
Medal	Name	Sport	Event	Date
Gold	Barbara Niewiedzial	Athletics	Women's 1500 m T20	5 September
Gold	Dariusz Pender	Wheelchair fencing	Men's épée A	5 September
Gold	Ewa Durska	Athletics	Women's shot put F20	5 September
Gold	Grzegorz Pluta	Wheelchair fencing	Men's sabre B	6 September
Gold	Joanna Mendak	Swimming	Women's 100 m butterfly S12	2 September
Gold	Karolina Kucharczyk	Athletics	Women's long jump F20	3 September
Gold	Katarzyna Piekart	Athletics	Women's javelin throw F46	1 September
Gold	Maciej Lepiato	Athletics	Men's high jump F46	8 September
Gold	Mateusz Michalski	Athletics	Men's 200 m T12	8 September
Gold	Natalia Partyka	Table tennis	Women's individual – Class 10	3 September
Gold	Patryk Chojnowski	Table tennis	Men's individual – Class 10	2 September
Gold	Piotr Grudzień; Marcin Skrzynecki	Table tennis	Men's team – Class 6–8	7 September
Gold	Rafał Wilk	Cycling	Men's road time trial H3	5 September
Gold	Rafał Wilk	Cycling	Men's road race H3	7 September
Silver	Alicja Fiodorow	Athletics	Women's 200 m T46	1 September
Silver	Anna Harkowska	Cycling	Women's road race C4-5	30 August
Silver	Anna Harkowska	Cycling	Women's road time trial C5	5 September
Silver	Anna Harkowska	Cycling	Women's road race C4-5	6 September
Silver	Arleta Meloch	Athletics	Women's 1500 m T20	5 September
Silver	Daniel Pek	Athletics	Men's 1500 m T20	4 September
Silver	Janusz Rokicki	Athletics	Men's shot put F57/58	4 September
Silver	Karol Kozuń	Athletics	Men's shot put F54/55/56	1 September
Silver	Krzysztof Kosikowski; Artur Korc (guide)	Cycling	Men's road race B	8 September
Silver	Mariusz Sobczak	Athletics	Men's long jump F36	5 September
Silver	Mateusz Michalski	Athletics	Men's 100 m T12	4 September
Silver	Oliwia Jabłońska	Swimming	Women's 100 m butterfly S10	1 September
Silver	Sebastian Powroźniak; Patryk Chojnowski	Table tennis	Men's team – Class 9–10	8 September
Bronze	Alicja Eigner; Małgorzata Jankowska; Natalia Partyka; Karolina Pęk	Table tennis	Women's team – Class 6–10	8 September
Bronze	Alicja Fiodorow	Athletics	Women's 400 m T46	8 September
Bronze	Łukasz Mamczar	Athletics	Men's high jump F42	3 September
Bronze	Marta Makowska	Wheelchair fencing	Women's foil B	4 September
Bronze	Milena Olszewska	Archery	Women's individual recurve	4 September
Bronze	Paulina Woźniak	Swimming	Women's 100 m breaststroke SB8	1 September
Bronze	Rafał Korc	Athletics	Men's 1500 m T20	4 September
Bronze	Tomasz Błatkiewicz	Athletics	Men's discus throw F37/38	7 September
Bronze	Tomasz Rebisz	Athletics	Men's shot put F46	6 September

== Archery ==
=== Men ===
Athlete	Event	Ranking round		Round of 32	Round of 16	Quarterfinals	Semifinals	Finals	
Athlete	Event	Score	Seed	Opposition score	Opposition score	Opposition score	Opposition score	Opposition score	Rank
Marek Kantczak	Men's individual compound open	653	10	Hudson (CAN); W 6-0	Bartos (CZE); L 0-6	did not advance			
Wiktor Patryas	Men's individual recurve standing	596	14	Polat (TUR); L 2-6	did not advance				
Piotr Sawicki	Men's individual recurve W1/W2	600	8	Bye	Browne (GBR); L 4-6	did not advance			

=== Women ===
Athlete	Event	Ranking round		Round of 32	Round of 16	Quarterfinals	Semifinals	Finals	
Athlete	Event	Score	Seed	Opposition score	Opposition score	Opposition score	Opposition score	Opposition score	Rank
Milena Olszewska	Women's individual recurve standing	580	2	Bye	Walmsley (GBR); W 7-1	Batorova (RUS); W 6-4	Yan H (CHN); L 2-6	Byambasuren (MGL); W 6-2	3rd place, bronze medalist(s)
Grazyna Wojciechowska	Women's individual recurve standing	477	16	Duboc (FRA); L 2-6	did not advance				

== Athletics ==
=== Men's track ===
Athlete	Events	Heat		Semifinal		Final	
Athlete	Events	Time	Rank	Time	Rank	Time	Rank
Marcin Awizen	800m T46	2:01.32 SB	15	did not advance			
Marcin Awizen	1500m T46	DNF		did not advance			
Tomasz Hamerlak	1500m T54	3:20.42	21	did not advance			
Tomasz Hamerlak	5000m T54	11:30.69	12	did not advance			
Tomasz Hamerlak	Marathon T54	—N/a				1:31:34	8
Mateusz Michalski	100m T12	11.01	3 Q	—N/a		10.88	2nd place, silver medalist(s)
Mateusz Michalski	200m T12	22.12	1 Q	22.09	3 q	21.56 WR	1st place, gold medalist(s)
Marcin Mielczarek	100m T36	12.84	7 q	—N/a		12.80	8
Marcin Mielczarek	200m T36	—N/a				26.05 PB	6
Rafal Korc	1500m T20	—N/a				3:59.53 PB	3rd place, bronze medalist(s)
Daniel Pek	1500m T20	—N/a				3:59.45 PB	2nd place, silver medalist(s)
Łukasz Wietecki	800m T13	1:55.32 PB	3 Q	—N/a		1:55.44	4
Łukasz Wietecki	1500m T13	3:55.67 PB	7 Q	—N/a		3:56.26	7

=== Men's field ===
Athlete	Events	Mark (m)	Points	Rank
Tomasz Blatkiewicz	Discus throw F37-38	54.02	1008	3rd place, bronze medalist(s)
Tomasz Blatkiewicz	Shot put F37-38	15.18 PB	-	5
Jacek Kolodziej	Long jump F20	6.31 SB	-	5
Karol Kozun	Javelin throw F54-56	27.62 SB	-	7
Karol Kozun	Shot put F52-53	11.36 SB	973	2nd place, silver medalist(s)
Maciej Lepiato	High jump F46	2.12 WR	-	1st place, gold medalist(s)
Lukasz Mamczarz	High jump F42	1.74	-	3rd place, bronze medalist(s)
Marcin Mielczarek	Long jump F36	5.07 =PB	-	4
Pawel Piotrowski	Discus throw F35-36	37.59	-	4
Miroslaw Pych	Javelin throw F12/13	52.12 SB	860	7
Tomasz Rebisz	Shot put F46	15.01 SB	-	3rd place, bronze medalist(s)
Janusz Rokicki	Shot put F57-58	15.68 SB	960	2nd place, silver medalist(s)
Krzysztof Smorszczewski	Shot put F52-53	12.16 PB	929	7
Mariusz Sobczak	Long jump F36	5.14 PB	-	2nd place, silver medalist(s)
Maciej Sochal	Club throw F31/32/51	29.04	891	9
Maciej Sochal	Shot put F32-33	9.18	908	4
Bartosz Tyszkowski	Discus throw F40	39.20	-	4
Bartosz Tyszkowski	Shot put F40	11.98	-	4

=== Women's track ===
Athlete	Events	Heat		Semifinal		Final	
Athlete	Events	Time	Rank	Time	Rank	Time	Rank
Anna Duzikowska	100m T13	14.31	11	did not advance			
Anna Duzikowska	400m T13	—N/a				1:03.33 PB	6
Alicja Fiodorow	200m T46	25.92 PB	3 Q	—N/a		25.49	2nd place, silver medalist(s)
Alicja Fiodorow	400m T46	—N/a				58.48 PB	3rd place, bronze medalist(s)
Marta Langner	100m T37	15.00	13	did not advance			
Arleta Meloch	1500m T20	—N/a				4:39.04	2nd place, silver medalist(s)
Barbara Niewiedzial	1500m T20	—N/a				4:35.26	1st place, gold medalist(s)
Katarzyna Piekart	100m T46	13.04 PB	4 Q	—N/a		13.10	4
Katarzyna Piekart	200m T46	27.21	7 Q	—N/a		27.18	7
Ewa Zielinska	100m T42	—N/a				17.47	9

=== Women's field ===
Athlete	Events	Mark (m)	Points	Rank
Renata Chilewska	Discus throw F35/36	25.80	908	5
Renata Chilewska	Shot put F35/36	9.54	873	6
Ewa Durska	Shot put F20	13.80 PR	-	1st place, gold medalist(s)
Daria Kabiesz	Discus throw F40	24.99	-	5
Daria Kabiesz	Shot put F40	7.90	-	5
Karolina Kucharczyk	Long jump F20	6.00 WR	-	1st place, gold medalist(s)
Marta Langner	Long jump F37/38	4.20	965	6
Katarzyna Piekart	Javelin throw F46	41.15 WR	-	1st place, gold medalist(s)
Ewa Zielinska	Long jump F42/44	3.50	849	12

== Cycling ==
=== Road ===
Athlete	Event	Time	Rank
Krzysztof Kosikowski; Artur Korc (Pilot)	Men's road race B	2:26:57	2nd place, silver medalist(s)
Krzysztof Kosikowski; Artur Korc (Pilot)	Men's road time trial B	31:48.86	7
Rafał Wilk	Men's road race H3	1:50:05	1st place, gold medalist(s)
Rafał Wilk	Men's road time trial H3	25:24.17	1st place, gold medalist(s)
Arkadiusz Skrzypiński	Men's road race H3	1:59:29	5
Arkadiusz Skrzypiński	Men's road time trial H3	28:37.07	8
Monika Pudlis	Women's road race H3	1:49:30	5
Monika Pudlis	Women's road time trial H3	34:26.30	5
Anna Harkowska	Women's road race C4-5	1:47:58	2nd place, silver medalist(s)
Anna Harkowska	Women's road time trial C5	24:14.94	2nd place, silver medalist(s)

=== Track ===
Athlete	Event	Qualification		Final	
Athlete	Event	Time	Rank	Opposition Time	Rank
Anna Harkowska	Women's 500 m time trial C4–5	—N/a		39.599	4
Anna Harkowska	Women's individual pursuit C5	3:48.885	2 Q	Storey (GBR); L LAP	2nd place, silver medalist(s)

== Powerlifting ==
Men

Athlete	Event	Result	Rank
Damian Kulig	100 kg	206.0	6
Wawrzyniec Latus	75 kg	183.0	6
Piotr Szymeczek	82.5 kg	190.0	8
Mariusz Tomczyk	60 kg	171.0	6

Women

Athlete	Event	Result	Rank
Justyna Kozdryk	44 kg	95.0	5
Marzena Lazarz	75 kg	106.0	6

== Rowing ==
Athlete	Event	Heats		Repechage		Final	
Athlete	Event	Time	Rank	Time	Rank	Time	Rank
Martyna Snopek	Women's single sculls	6:10.08	4 R	6:13.00	3 FB	6:23.65	3
Michal Gadowski; Jolanta Pawlak	Mixed double sculls	4:13.97	5 R	4:17.47	4 FB	4:17.23	4

== Shooting ==
Athlete	Event	Qualification		Final	
Athlete	Event	Score	Rank	Score	Rank
Jolanta Szulc	Women's 50 m rifle 3 positions SH1	561	6 Q	649.3	6
Jolanta Szulc	Women's 10 m air rifle standing SH1	374	17	did not advance	
Jolanta Szulc	Mixed 50 m rifle prone SH1	571	42	did not advance	
Jolanta Szulc	Mixed 10 m air rifle prone SH1	598	18	did not advance	
Wojciech Kosowski	Men's 10 m air pistol SH1	568	1 Q	660.7	7
Wojciech Kosowski	Mixed 50 m pistol SH1	533	5	623.3	7

== Swimming ==
=== Men ===
Athletes	Event	Heat		Final	
Athletes	Event	Time	Rank	Time	Rank
Jacek Czech	50m freestyle S2	1:07.56	6 Q	1:06.41	4
Jacek Czech	100m freestyle S2	2:27.14	6 Q	2:22.84	4
Jacek Czech	50m backstroke S2	1:09.31	6 Q	1:07.74	5
Grzegorz Polkowski	50m freestyle S11	28.18	11	did not advance	
Grzegorz Polkowski	100m freestyle S11	1:02.75	8 Q	1:02.72	8
Grzegorz Polkowski	100m backstroke S11	1:17.32	12	did not advance	
Marcin Ryszka	100m freestyle S11	1:06.59	14	did not advance	
Marcin Ryszka	400m freestyle S11	5:16.68	10	did not advance	
Marcin Ryszka	100m breaststroke SB11	1:22.23	9	did not advance	

=== Women ===
Athletes	Event	Heat		Final	
Athletes	Event	Time	Rank	Time	Rank
Karolina Hamer	50m backstroke S4	1:05.62	8 Q	1:06.08	8
Oliwia Jablonska	50m freestyle S10	30.58	14	did not advance	
Oliwia Jablonska	100m freestyle S10	1:04.89	8 Q	1:03.76	8
Oliwia Jablonska	400m freestyle S10	4:51.67	5 Q	4:41.65	4
Oliwia Jablonska	100m butterfly S10	1:11.11	3 Q	1:08.55 ER	2nd place, silver medalist(s)
Oliwia Jablonska	200m individual medley SM5	1:11.11	3 Q	DNS	
Joanna Mendak	50m freestyle S12	28.81	6 Q	28.38	6
Joanna Mendak	100m freestyle S12	1:03.61	5 Q	1:01.07	4
Joanna Mendak	100m butterfly S12	—N/a		1:06.16	1st place, gold medalist(s)
Joanna Mendak	200m individual medley SM12	2:39.98	4 Q	2:35.38	4
Katarzyna Pawlik	50m freestyle S10	31.37	17	did not advance	
Katarzyna Pawlik	100m freestyle S10	1:07.14	12	did not advance	
Katarzyna Pawlik	400m freestyle S10	4:43.45	3 Q	4:45.50	5
Katarzyna Pawlik	100m backstroke S10	1:18.49	13	did not advance	
Katarzyna Pawlik	200m individual medley SM10	2:49.31	10	did not advance	
Paulina Wozniak	100m butterfly S9	1:13.56	7 Q	1:12.52	6
Paulina Wozniak	100m breaststroke SB8	1:24.45	4 Q	1:22.45	3rd place, bronze medalist(s)
Paulina Wozniak	200m individual medley SM9	2:44.19	8 Q	2:44.17	8

== Table tennis ==
Men

Athlete	Event	Preliminaries		Quarterfinals	Semifinals	Finals	
Athlete	Event	Opposition Result	Rank	Opposition Result	Opposition Result	Opposition Result	Rank
Piotr Grudzien	Singles class 8	Csejtey (SVK); L 1–3; Ali (EGY); L 0-3	3	did not advance			
Marcin Skrzynecki	Singles class 8	Ledoux (BEL); W 3-1; Salmin (BRA); W 3-0	1 Q	Wilson (GBR); L 1-3	did not advance		
Patryk Chojnowski	Singles class 10	Bye		Hao (CHN); W 3-0	Ruiz Reyes (ESP); W 3-0	Ge (CHN); W 3-0	1st place, gold medalist(s)
Sebastian Powrozniak	Singles class 10	Karabec (CZE); L 0-3; Cardona (ESP); L 1-3	3	did not advance			
Pawel Olejarski	Singles class 11	Periera-Leal (FRA); L 0-3; Maciel (BRA); W 3-0	2 Q	—N/a	Byeongjun (KOR); L 1-3	Pereira-Leal (FRA); L 0-3	4

Women

Athlete	Event	Preliminaries		Quarterfinals	Semifinals	Finals	
Athlete	Event	Opposition Result	Rank	Opposition Result	Opposition Result	Opposition Result	Rank
Dorota Bucław	Singles class 1-2	Maenpuak (THA); L 0–3; Pushpasheva (RUS); L 0-3	3	did not advance			
Katarzyna Marszal	Singles class 6	Chebanika (RUS); L 0–3; Eun Bong (KOR); W 3-0; Khodzynska (UKR); L 0-3	3	did not advance			
Alicja Eigner	Singles class 6	Klymenko (UKR); L 0–3; McDonnell (AUS); W 3-0; Grabe (GER); L 1-3	3	did not advance			
Katarzyna Marszal	Singles class 6	Chebanika (RUS); L 0–3; Eun Bong (KOR); W 3-0; Khodzynska (UKR); L 0-3	3	did not advance			
Karolina Pek	Singles class 9	Kavas (TUR); L 2–3; Liu (CHN); L 2-3; Lina (CHN); L 0-3	4	did not advance			
Małgorzata Jankowska	Singles class 9	Meili (CHN); L 0–3; Mairie (FRA); L 0-3; Gorshkaleva (RUS); W 3-2	4	did not advance			
Natalia Partyka	Singles class 10	Ertis (TUR); W 3–0; Qian (CHN); W 3-0; Maghraby (EGY); W 3-0	1 Q	—N/a	Tapper (AUS); W 3–0	Qian (CHN); W 3–2	1st place, gold medalist(s)

Teams

Athlete	Event	First Round	Quarterfinals	Semifinals	Finals	
Athlete	Event	Opposition Result	Opposition Result	Opposition Result	Opposition Result	Rank
Piotr Grudzien; Marcin Skrzynecki	Team class 6-8	Ukraine (UKR); W 3-0	Belgium (BEL); W 3-2	Great Britain (GBR); W 3-2	Spain (ESP); W 3-0	1st place, gold medalist(s)
Patryk Chojnowski; Sebastian Powrozniak	Men's team class 9-10	Bye	Sweden (SWE); W 3-2	Spain (ESP); W 3-2	China (CHN); L 2-3	2nd place, silver medalist(s)
Alicja Eigner; Malgorzata Jankowska; Natalia Partyka; Karolina Pek	Women's team class 6-10	Bye	Brazil (BRA); W 1-3	Turkey (TUR); L 2-3	France (FRA); W 3-2	3rd place, bronze medalist(s)

== Wheelchair basketball ==
=== Men's tournament ===
Poland qualified for the men's team event in wheelchair basketball by finishing sixth at the 2010 Wheelchair Basketball World Championship. Competing athletes are given eight-level classification points specific to wheelchair basketball, ranging from 0.5 to 4.5 with lower points representing a higher degree of disability. The total points of all players on the court cannot exceed 14.

Squad list	Group stage (group B)		Quarter-final	5th–8th place semi-final	7th/8th place match	
Squad list	Opposition Result	Rank	Opposition Result	Opposition Result	Opposition Result	Rank
From: Marcin Balcerowski; Krzysztof Bandura; Jan Cyrul; Piotr Darnikowski; Mateusz Filipski; Sławomir Gorzkowicz; Piotr Łuszyński; Andrzej Macek; Dominik Mosler; Krzysztof Pietrzyk; Robert Wiśnik; Marcin Wróbel; Coach: Piotr Łuszyński	Colombia; W 63–45	4	Australia; L 53–76	Germany; L 66–81	Turkey; L 74–76	8
From: Marcin Balcerowski; Krzysztof Bandura; Jan Cyrul; Piotr Darnikowski; Mateusz Filipski; Sławomir Gorzkowicz; Piotr Łuszyński; Andrzej Macek; Dominik Mosler; Krzysztof Pietrzyk; Robert Wiśnik; Marcin Wróbel; Coach: Piotr Łuszyński	Japan; W 78–53	4	Australia; L 53–76	Germany; L 66–81	Turkey; L 74–76	8
From: Marcin Balcerowski; Krzysztof Bandura; Jan Cyrul; Piotr Darnikowski; Mateusz Filipski; Sławomir Gorzkowicz; Piotr Łuszyński; Andrzej Macek; Dominik Mosler; Krzysztof Pietrzyk; Robert Wiśnik; Marcin Wróbel; Coach: Piotr Łuszyński	Canada; L 65–83	4	Australia; L 53–76	Germany; L 66–81	Turkey; L 74–76	8
From: Marcin Balcerowski; Krzysztof Bandura; Jan Cyrul; Piotr Darnikowski; Mateusz Filipski; Sławomir Gorzkowicz; Piotr Łuszyński; Andrzej Macek; Dominik Mosler; Krzysztof Pietrzyk; Robert Wiśnik; Marcin Wróbel; Coach: Piotr Łuszyński	Great Britain; L 87–58	4	Australia; L 53–76	Germany; L 66–81	Turkey; L 74–76	8
From: Marcin Balcerowski; Krzysztof Bandura; Jan Cyrul; Piotr Darnikowski; Mateusz Filipski; Sławomir Gorzkowicz; Piotr Łuszyński; Andrzej Macek; Dominik Mosler; Krzysztof Pietrzyk; Robert Wiśnik; Marcin Wróbel; Coach: Piotr Łuszyński	Germany; L 63–73	4	Australia; L 53–76	Germany; L 66–81	Turkey; L 74–76	8

Group B

Team	Pld	W	L	PF	PA	PD	Pts	Qualification
Canada	5	5	0	362	280	+82	10	Quarter-finals
Germany	5	4	1	339	303	+36	9	Quarter-finals
Great Britain	5	3	2	365	301	+64	8	Quarter-finals
Poland	5	2	3	327	341	−14	7	Quarter-finals
Japan	5	1	4	273	330	−57	6	Eliminated
Colombia	5	0	5	223	334	−111	5	Eliminated

30 August 2012
15:15

Report

Colombia	45–63	Poland
Scoring by quarter: 11–16, 18–14, 8–14, 8–19
Pts: Sanz Londono 21; Rebs: Sanz Londono 8 Asts: Ipema 4		Pts: Filipski, Balcerowski 18; Rebs: Luszynski 12; Asts: Luszynski 12

Basketball Arena, London
Referees: Matt Wells (AUS)

31 August 2012
10:45

Report

Poland	78–53	Japan
Scoring by quarter: 21–10, 22–10, 21–19, 14–14
Pts: Filipski 24; Rebs: Luszynski 17; Asts: Filipski 10		Pts: Fujimoto 18; Rebs: Fujimoto 9 Asts: Kozai 4

North Greenwich Arena, London
Referees: Cristian Salguero (ARG)

1 September 2012
21:15

Report

Canada	83–65	Poland
Scoring by quarter: 16–18, 23–17, 18–12, 26–18
Pts: Anderson 34; Rebs: Anderson 9 Asts: Anderson 12		Pts: Filipski 20; Rebs: Łuszyński 7 Asts: Filipski, Łuszyński 7

North Greenwich Arena, London
Referees: Phil Haines (AUS)

2 September 2012
18:30

Report

Poland	58–87	Great Britain
Scoring by quarter: 10–22, 14–23, 19–25, 15–17
Pts: Balcerowski 11; Rebs: Filipski 7 Asts: Filipski 5		Pts: Bywater 22; Rebs: Sagar 8 Asts: Hall 6

Basketball Arena, London
Referees: Rui Marques (BRA)

3 September 2012
20:45

Report

Germany	73–63	Poland
Scoring by quarter: 11–15, 18–22, 15–14, 29–12
Pts: Haller 17; Rebs: Bienek 10; Asts: Passiwan, Bienek 6		Pts: Filipski 27; Rebs: Luszynski 10; Asts: Luszynski 8

Basketball Arena, London
Referees: Juan Uruñuela (ESP)

Quarter-final

5 September 2012
21:15

Report

Australia	76–53	Poland
Scoring by quarter: 26–11, 13–17, 21–18, 16–7
Pts: Ness 26; Rebs: Norris, Ness 5 Asts: Eveson 6		Pts: Filipski 26; Rebs: Filipski 10; Asts: Filipski 8

North Greenwich Arena, London
Referees: Sergio Giordano (CAN)

5th–8th place semi-final

7 September 2012
13:00

Report

Poland	66–81	Germany
Scoring by quarter: 17–18, 16–24, 15–20, 18–19
Pts: Filipski 31; Rebs: Balcerowski 9 Asts: Luszynski 9		Pts: Passiwan 30; Rebs: Passiwan 10; Asts: Haller 8

North Greenwich Arena, London
Referees: Sébastien Gauthier (CAN)

7th/8th place match

8 September 2012
13:00

Report

Poland	74–76	Turkey
Scoring by quarter: 14–12, 21–22, 20–21, 19–21
Pts: Filipski 28; Rebs: Mosler 11; Asts: Filipski 15		Pts: Gümüş 30; Rebs: Gümüş 9 Asts: Gürbulak 13

North Greenwich Arena, London
Referees: Carsten Rehling (GER)

== Wheelchair fencing ==
=== Men ===
Athlete	Event	Qualification			Round of 16	Quarterfinal	Semifinal	Final / BM	
Athlete	Event	Opposition	Score	Rank	Opposition Score	Opposition Score	Opposition Score	Opposition Score	Rank
Adrian Castro	Men's sabre B	Francois (FRA)	L 1-5	4	did not advance				
Adrian Castro	Men's sabre B	Triantafyllou (GRE)	W 5-4	4	did not advance				
Adrian Castro	Men's sabre B	Kurzin (RUS)	L 2-5	4	did not advance				
Adrian Castro	Men's sabre B	Brinson (USA)	W 5-3	4	did not advance				
Piotr Czop	Men's foil B	Francois (FRA)	L 1-5	3 Q	Szekeres (HUN); L 5-15	did not advance			
Piotr Czop	Men's foil B	M Yusupov (RUS)	L 0-5	3 Q	Szekeres (HUN); L 5-15	did not advance			
Piotr Czop	Men's foil B	Bezyazychny (BLR)	W 5-4	3 Q	Szekeres (HUN); L 5-15	did not advance			
Piotr Czop	Men's foil B	Palavecino (ARG)	W 5-2	3 Q	Szekeres (HUN); L 5-15	did not advance			
Stefan Makowski	Men's foil A	Demchuk (UKR)	L 1-5	4 Q	Yusupov (RUS); L 13-15	did not advance			
Stefan Makowski	Men's foil A	Ye (CHN)	L 3-5	4 Q	Yusupov (RUS); L 13-15	did not advance			
Stefan Makowski	Men's foil A	Tokatlian (FRA)	L 2-5	4 Q	Yusupov (RUS); L 13-15	did not advance			
Stefan Makowski	Men's foil A	Alhaddad (KUW)	W 5-3	4 Q	Yusupov (RUS); L 13-15	did not advance			
Stefan Makowski	Men's foil A	Wong TT (HKG)	W 5-0	4 Q	Yusupov (RUS); L 13-15	did not advance			
Stefan Makowski	Men's sabre A	Chan WK (HKG)	L 2-5	4	did not advance				
Stefan Makowski	Men's sabre A	Chen Y (CHN)	L 1-5	4	did not advance				
Stefan Makowski	Men's sabre A	Fayzullin (RUS)	L 2-5	4	did not advance				
Stefan Makowski	Men's sabre A	Alexakis (GRE)	W 5-2	4	did not advance				
Dariusz Pender	Men's épée A	Tian (CHN)	L 2-5	3 Q	Stanczuk (POL); W 15-11	Tian (CHN); W 15-8	A Yusupov (RUS); W 15-14	Noble (FRA); W 15-9	1st place, gold medalist(s)
Dariusz Pender	Men's épée A	Citerne (FRA)	L 3-5	3 Q	Stanczuk (POL); W 15-11	Tian (CHN); W 15-8	A Yusupov (RUS); W 15-14	Noble (FRA); W 15-9	1st place, gold medalist(s)
Dariusz Pender	Men's épée A	Tsedryk (UKR)	W 5-3	3 Q	Stanczuk (POL); W 15-11	Tian (CHN); W 15-8	A Yusupov (RUS); W 15-14	Noble (FRA); W 15-9	1st place, gold medalist(s)
Dariusz Pender	Men's épée A	Wong TT (HKG)	W 5-4	3 Q	Stanczuk (POL); W 15-11	Tian (CHN); W 15-8	A Yusupov (RUS); W 15-14	Noble (FRA); W 15-9	1st place, gold medalist(s)
Dariusz Pender	Men's foil A	Chen Y (CHN)	L 3-5	3 Q	Lemoine (FRA); W 15-14	Chen Y (CHN); L 12-15	did not advance		
Dariusz Pender	Men's foil A	A Yusupov (RUS)	L 4-5	3 Q	Lemoine (FRA); W 15-14	Chen Y (CHN); L 12-15	did not advance		
Dariusz Pender	Men's foil A	Mato (HUN)	W 5-0	3 Q	Lemoine (FRA); W 15-14	Chen Y (CHN); L 12-15	did not advance		
Dariusz Pender	Men's foil A	Betti (ITA)	W 5-4	3 Q	Lemoine (FRA); W 15-14	Chen Y (CHN); L 12-15	did not advance		
Grzegorz Pluta	Men's épée B	Bezyazychny (BLR)	L 2-5	4 Q	Kuzyukov (RUS); L 5-8	did not advance			
Grzegorz Pluta	Men's épée B	Mainville (CAN)	W 5-3	4 Q	Kuzyukov (RUS); L 5-8	did not advance			
Grzegorz Pluta	Men's épée B	Silva Guissone (BRA)	L 2-5	4 Q	Kuzyukov (RUS); L 5-8	did not advance			
Grzegorz Pluta	Men's épée B	Kurzin (RUS)	W 5-4	4 Q	Kuzyukov (RUS); L 5-8	did not advance			
Grzegorz Pluta	Men's sabre B	Mainville (CAN)	W 5-1	1 Q	—N/a	Triantafyllou (GRE); W 15-9	Sarri (ITA); W 15-10	Cratere (FRA); W 15-8	1st place, gold medalist(s)
Grzegorz Pluta	Men's sabre B	Cratere (FRA)	W 5-3	1 Q	—N/a	Triantafyllou (GRE); W 15-9	Sarri (ITA); W 15-10	Cratere (FRA); W 15-8	1st place, gold medalist(s)
Grzegorz Pluta	Men's sabre B	Soler Marquez (ESP)	W 5-2	1 Q	—N/a	Triantafyllou (GRE); W 15-9	Sarri (ITA); W 15-10	Cratere (FRA); W 15-8	1st place, gold medalist(s)
Grzegorz Pluta	Men's sabre B	Tam CS (HKG)	W 5-2	1 Q	—N/a	Triantafyllou (GRE); W 15-9	Sarri (ITA); W 15-10	Cratere (FRA); W 15-8	1st place, gold medalist(s)
Radolsaw Stanczuk	Men's épée A	Duan (CHN)	L 0-5	3 Q	Pender (POL); L 11-15	did not advance			
Radolsaw Stanczuk	Men's épée A	Noble (FRA)	L 3-5	3 Q	Pender (POL); L 11-15	did not advance			
Radolsaw Stanczuk	Men's épée A	Mato (HUN)	W 5-2	3 Q	Pender (POL); L 11-15	did not advance			
Radolsaw Stanczuk	Men's épée A	Kavalenia (BLR)	W 5-2	3 Q	Pender (POL); L 11-15	did not advance			
Radolsaw Stanczuk	Men's sabre A	Pylarinos (GRE)	L 1-5	3 Q	Fayzullin (RUS); W 15-14	Pylarinos (GRE); W 15-6	Chen Y (CHN); L 8-15	Chan WK (HKG); L 9-15	4
Radolsaw Stanczuk	Men's sabre A	Frolov (RUS)	L 4-5	3 Q	Fayzullin (RUS); W 15-14	Pylarinos (GRE); W 15-6	Chen Y (CHN); L 8-15	Chan WK (HKG); L 9-15	4
Radolsaw Stanczuk	Men's sabre A	El Assine (FRA)	W 5-2	3 Q	Fayzullin (RUS); W 15-14	Pylarinos (GRE); W 15-6	Chen Y (CHN); L 8-15	Chan WK (HKG); L 9-15	4
Radolsaw Stanczuk	Men's sabre A	Razali (MAS)	W 5-3	3 Q	Fayzullin (RUS); W 15-14	Pylarinos (GRE); W 15-6	Chen Y (CHN); L 8-15	Chan WK (HKG); L 9-15	4
Zbigniew Wyganowski	Men's foil B	Datsko (UKR)	L 2-5	5	did not advance				
Zbigniew Wyganowski	Men's foil B	Silva Guissone (BRA)	L 3-5	5	did not advance				
Zbigniew Wyganowski	Men's foil B	Chung TC (HKG)	L 3-5	5	did not advance				
Zbigniew Wyganowski	Men's foil B	Cima (ITA)	L 3-5	5	did not advance				

=== Women ===
Athlete	Event	Qualification			Quarterfinal	Semifinal	Final / BM	
Athlete	Event	Opposition	Score	Rank	Opposition Score	Opposition Score	Opposition Score	Rank
Marta Fidrych	Women's épée A	Wu B (CHN)	W 5-2	3 Q/	Gorlina (UKR); L 10-15	did not advance		
Marta Fidrych	Women's épée A	Gorlina (UKR)	L 2-5	3 Q/	Gorlina (UKR); L 10-15	did not advance		
Marta Fidrych	Women's épée A	Krajnyak (HUN)	W 5-2	3 Q/	Gorlina (UKR); L 10-15	did not advance		
Marta Fidrych	Women's épée A	Lao (MAC)	W 5-1	3 Q/	Gorlina (UKR); L 10-15	did not advance		
Marta Fidrych	Women's épée A	Fan PS (HKG)	L 4-5	3 Q/	Gorlina (UKR); L 10-15	did not advance		
Marta Makowska	Women's épée B	Chan YC (HKG)	L 0-5	4 Q	Jana (THA); L 5-15	did not advance		
Marta Makowska	Women's épée B	Pozniak (UKR)	W 5-1	4 Q	Jana (THA); L 5-15	did not advance		
Marta Makowska	Women's épée B	Lemiashkevich (BLR)	L 4-5	4 Q	Jana (THA); L 5-15	did not advance		
Marta Makowska	Women's épée B	Demaude (FRA)	L 4-5	4 Q	Jana (THA); L 5-15	did not advance		
Marta Makowska	Women's foil B	Chan YC (HKG)	L 1-5	3 Q	Briese-Baetke (GER); W 15-11	Yao F (CHN); L 10-15	Zhou J (CHN); W 15-14	3rd place, bronze medalist(s)
Marta Makowska	Women's foil B	Dani (HUN)	L 2-5	3 Q	Briese-Baetke (GER); W 15-11	Yao F (CHN); L 10-15	Zhou J (CHN); W 15-14	3rd place, bronze medalist(s)
Marta Makowska	Women's foil B	Yao F (CHN)	W 5-3	3 Q	Briese-Baetke (GER); W 15-11	Yao F (CHN); L 10-15	Zhou J (CHN); W 15-14	3rd place, bronze medalist(s)
Marta Makowska	Women's foil B	Vasileva (RUS)	W 5-3	3 Q	Briese-Baetke (GER); W 15-11	Yao F (CHN); L 10-15	Zhou J (CHN); W 15-14	3rd place, bronze medalist(s)
Women's team	Women's team open	—N/a			Ukraine (UKR); W 45-28	Hungary (HUN); L 40-45	Hong Kong (HKG); L 26-45	4

== Wheelchair tennis ==
Athlete	Event	Round of 64	Round of 32	Round of 16	Quarter-final	Semi-final	Final	
Athlete	Event	Opposition Result	Opposition Result	Opposition Result	Opposition Result	Opposition Result	Opposition Result	Rank
Albin Batycki	Men's singles	Pommê (BRA); L 4–6, 2–6	did not advance					
Tadeusz Kruszelnicki	Men's singles	Scheffers (NED); L 3–6, 1–6	did not advance					
Piotr Jaroszewski	Men's singles	Mamipour (IRI); W 6–2, 6–1	Peifer (FRA); L 1–6, 1–6	did not advance				
Kamil Fabisiak	Men's singles	Farkas (HUN); L 3–6, 5–7	did not advance					

== See also ==
- Poland at the Paralympics
- Poland at the 2012 Summer Olympics
