= Table tennis at the 2012 Summer Paralympics – Women's individual – Class 6 =

Table tennis Women's C6 at the XIV Paralympic Games
- Venue: ExCeL Exhibition Centre
- Dates: 30 August – 3 September 2012
- Competitors: 8 from 6 nations

Medalists
1st place, gold medalist(s)		Raisa Chebanika	Russia
2nd place, silver medalist(s)		Antonina Khodzynska	Ukraine
3rd place, bronze medalist(s)		Yuliya Klymenko	Ukraine

The Women's individual table tennis – Class 6 tournament at the 2012 Summer Paralympics in London took place from 30 August to 3 September 2012 at ExCeL Exhibition Centre. Classes 6–10 were for athletes with a physical impairment who competed from a standing position; the lower the number, the greater the impact the impairment was on an athlete’s ability to compete.

In the preliminary stage, athletes competed in two groups of four. Top two in each group qualified for the semi-finals.

== Results ==
All times are local (BST/UTC+1)

=== Finals ===
Semifinals: 1 Sep 16:00
A1	Antonina Khodzynska (UKR)	11	11	11
B2	Stephanie Grebe (GER)	7	4	7
A2	Raisa Chebanika (RUS)	11	11	11	3	11
B1	Yuliya Klymenko (UKR)	13	9	7	11	8

Gold medal match: 3 Sep 11:00
A1	Antonina Khodzynska (UKR)	12	2	8
A2	Raisa Chebanika (RUS)	14	11	11
Bronze medal match
B2	Stephanie Grebe (GER)	9	11	5	9
B1	Yuliya Klymenko (UKR)	11	7	11	11

=== Preliminary round ===
Qualified for the semifinals

==== Group A ====
Athlete	Won	Lost	Games won	Points diff
Antonina Khodzynska (UKR)	3	0	9	+29
Raisa Chebanika (RUS)	2	1	7	+18
Katarzyna Marszal (POL)	1	2	4	-8
Jang Eun Bong (KOR)	0	3	1	-39

30 August, 12:20

Katarzyna Marszal (POL)	7	7	5
Raisa Chebanika (RUS)	11	11	11

30 August, 12:20

Antonina Khodzynska (UKR)	11	11	11
Jang Eun Bong (KOR)	7	7	5

30 August, 20:00

Jang Eun Bong (KOR)	10	4	9
Katarzyna Marszal (POL)	12	11	11

30 August, 20:00

Antonina Khodzynska (UKR)	8	11	11	11
Raisa Chebanika (RUS)	11	8	7	5

31 August, 18:40

Raisa Chebanika (RUS)	11	12	11	11
Jang Eun Bong (KOR)	13	10	4	4

31 August, 18:40

Antonina Khodzynska (UKR)	11	5	11	11
Katarzyna Marszal (POL)	8	11	7	7

==== Group B ====
Athlete	Won	Lost	Games won	Points diff
Yuliya Klymenko (UKR)	3	0	9	+45
Stephanie Grebe (GER)	2	1	7	+27
Alicja Eigner (POL)	1	2	1	-28
Rebecca McDonnell (AUS)	0	3	0	-44

30 August, 12:20

Stephanie Grebe (GER)	11	11	11
Rebecca McDonnell (AUS)	5	1	4

30 August, 12:20

Alicja Eigner (POL)	3	6	3
Yuliya Klymenko (UKR)	11	11	11

30 August, 20:40

Rebecca McDonnell (AUS)	9	9	8
Alicja Eigner (POL)	11	11	11

30 August, 20:40

Stephanie Grebe (GER)	13	11	9	10
Yuliya Klymenko (UKR)	15	8	11	12

31 August, 18:40

Stephanie Grebe (GER)	11	11	9	11
Alicja Eigner (POL)	9	8	11	7

31 August, 18:40

Yuliya Klymenko (UKR)	11	11	11
Rebecca McDonnell (AUS)	3	3	6
