= Wheelchair fencing at the 2012 Summer Paralympics – Men's foil A =

Men's Individual Foil A at the XIV Paralympic Games
- Venue: ExCeL
- Dates: 4 September 2012
- Competitors: 16 from 10 nations

Medalists
1st place, gold medalist(s)		Ye Ruyi	China
2nd place, silver medalist(s)		Chen Yijun	China
3rd place, bronze medalist(s)		Richárd Osváth	Hungary

The men's individual foil A at the 2012 Summer Paralympics in London took place on 4 September 2012 at ExCeL Exhibition Centre. This class is for athletes who have good trunk control and their fencing arm is not affected by their impairment.

== Schedule ==
All times are British Summer Time

Date	Time	Round
4 September 2012	09:30	Qualification
4 September 2012	12:00	Round of 16
4 September 2012	14:30	Quarterfinals
4 September 2012	17:45	Semifinals
4 September 2012	18:30	Final

== Competition format ==
The tournament started with a group phase round-robin followed by a knockout stage.

During a qualification round-robin, bouts lasted a maximum of three minutes, or until one athlete had scored five hits. There was then a knockout phase, in which bouts lasted a maximum of nine minutes (three periods of three minutes), or until one athlete had scored 15 hits.

== Results ==
=== Qualification ===
==== Group A ====
Athlete	B	V	V/B	HS	HD	China (CHN)	Russia (RUS)	Poland (POL)	Hungary (HUN)	Italy (ITA)
Chen Yijun (CHN)	4	4	1.00	20	6	—	5–2	5–3	5–1	5–0
Artur Yusupov (RUS)	4	3	0.75	17	14	2–5	—	5–4	5–2	5–3
Dariusz Pender (POL)	4	2	0.50	17	14	3–5	4–5	—	5–0	5–4
Gyula Mato (HUN)	4	1	0.25	8	18	1–5	2–5	0–5	—	5–3
Matteo Betti (ITA)	4	0	0.00	10	20	0–5	3–5	4–5	3–5	—

==== Group B ====
Athlete	B	V	V/B	HS	HD	Hungary (HUN)	Hong Kong (HKG)	France (FRA)	Russia (RUS)	United States (USA)
Richard Osvath (HUN)	4	3	0.75	18	9	—	3–5	5–3	5–1	5–0
Chan Wing Kin (HKG)	4	3	0.75	19	13	5–3	—	4–5	5–4	5–1
Ludovic Lemoine (FRA)	4	2	0.50	16	16	3–5	5–4	—	3–5	5–2
Ivan Andreev (RUS)	4	2	0.50	15	16	1–5	4–5	5–3	—	5–3
Mario Rodriguez (USA)	4	4	0.00	6	20	0–5	1–5	2–5	3–5	—

==== Group C ====
Athlete	B	V	V/B	HS	HD	Kuwait (KUW)	Ukraine (UKR)	Poland (POL)	France (FRA)	Hong Kong (HKG)	China (CHN)
Andrii Demchuk (UKR)	3	2	1	22	15	3–5	—	5–1	5–3	5–1	4–5
Ye Ruyi (CHN)	3	2	2	19	18	5–1	5–4	5–3	4–5	0–5	—
Damien Tokatlian (FRA)	3	2	0.66	18	17	5–1	3–5	5–2	—	0–5	5–4
Stefan Makowski (POL)	2	3	1.5	7	10	5–3	1–5	—	2–5	5–0	3–5
Abdullah Alhaddad (KUW)	2	3	1.5	15	19	—	5–3	3–5	1–5	5–1	1–5
Wong Tang Tat (HKG)	0	5	5	2	25	1–5	1–5	0–5	0–5	—	0–5

=== Finals ===
Round of 16
Ludovic Lemoine (FRA)	14
Dariusz Pender (POL)	15
Stefan Makowski (POL)	13
Artur Yusupov (RUS)	15
Andrii Demchuk (UKR)	12
Ivan Andreev (RUS)	15

Quarter-finals
Chen Yijun (CHN)	15
Dariusz Pender (POL)	12
Wing Kin Chan (HKG)	6
Richard Osvath (HUN)	15
Damien Tokatlian (FRA)	15
Artur Yusupov (RUS)	10
Ye Ruyi (CHN)	6
Ivan Andreev (RUS)	15

Semi-finals
Chen Yijun (CHN)	15
Richard Osvath (HUN)	13
Damien Tokatlian (FRA)	8
Ye Ruyi (CHN)	15

Final
Chen Yijun (CHN)	5
Ye Ruyi (CHN)	15
Third place match
Richard Osvath (HUN)	15
Damien Tokatlian (FRA)	7
