= Kuwait at the 2012 Summer Paralympics =

- IPC code: KUW
- NPC: Kuwait Paralympic Committee

in London
- Competitors: 6 in 2 sports
- Medals: Gold 0 Silver 0 Bronze 0 Total 0

Summer Paralympics appearances (overview)
- 1980; 1984; 1988; 1992; 1996; 2000; 2004; 2008; 2012; 2016; 2020; 2024

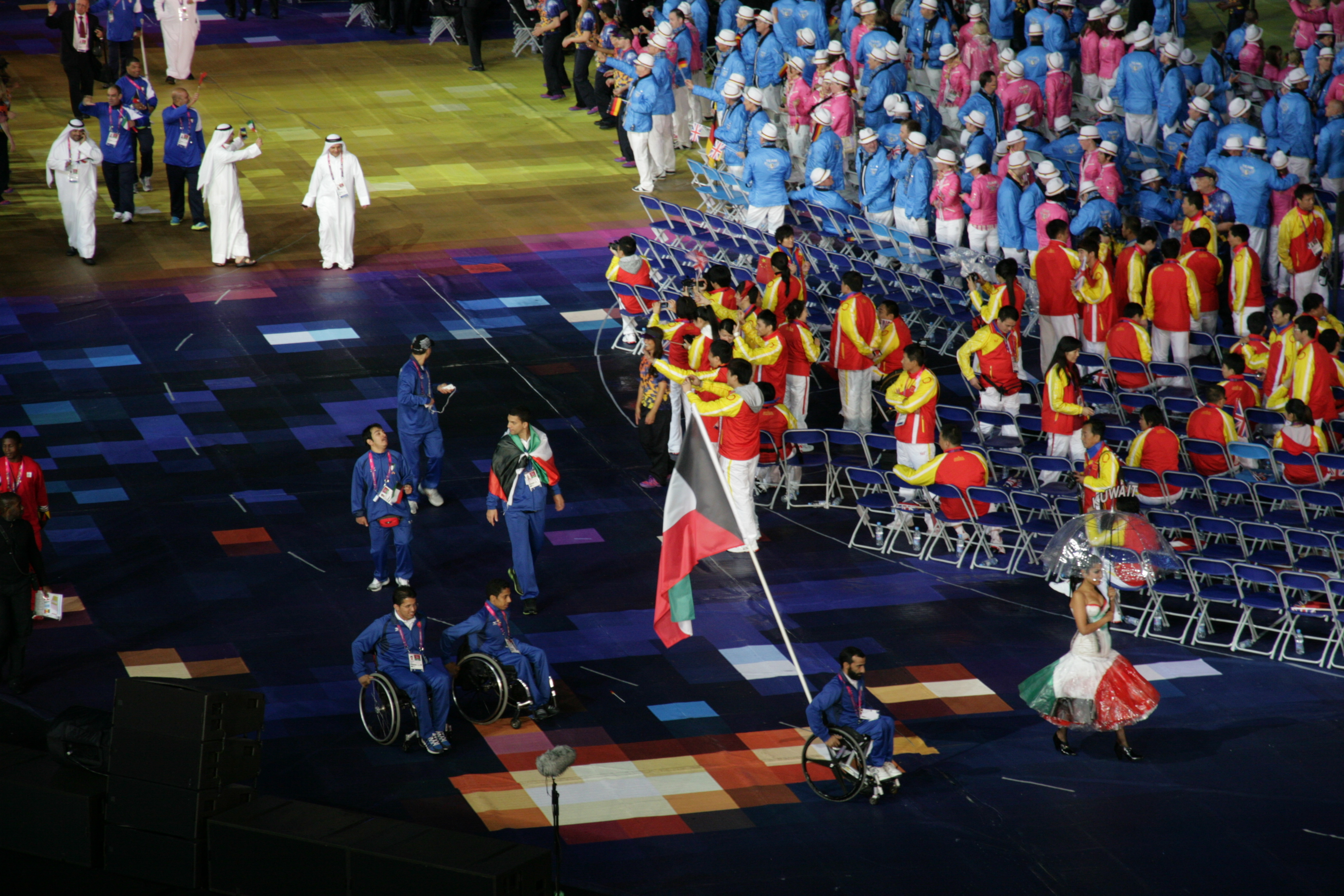
Kuwait Paralympic team at the London 2012 Opening Ceremony

Kuwait competed at the 2012 Summer Paralympics in London, United Kingdom from August 29 to September 9, 2012.

== Athletics ==
Men’s Track and Road Events

Athlete	Event	Heat		Final	
Athlete	Event	Result	Rank	Result	Rank
Hamad Aladwani	100m T53	15.62	4 q	15.47	7
Hamad Aladwani	200m T53	26.67	2 Q	26.50	6
Hamad Aladwani	400m T53	51.35	2 Q	52.04	8
Ahmad Almutairi	100m T34	17.67	5	did not advance	
Ahmad Almutairi	200m T34	31.02	4	did not advance	

Men’s Field Events

Athlete	Event	Distance	Points	Rank
Ahmad Almutairi	Javelin Throw F33-34	17.34	—	15
Abdullah Alsaleh	Shot Put F46	13.10	—	8
Mohammad Naser	Shot Put F32-33	7.95	800	6
Naser Saleh	Shot Put F32-33	7.46	639	11

== Wheelchair Fencing ==
Men

Athlete	Event	Group Stage			Round of 16	Quarterfinals	Semifinals	Final	
Athlete	Event	Opposition Result	Opposition Result	Rank	Opposition Result	Opposition Result	Opposition Result	Opposition Result	Rank
Abdullah Alhaddad	Individual foil A	Tokatlian (FRA); L 1-5	Makowski (POL); L 3-5	12	did not advance				
Abdullah Alhaddad	Individual foil A	Wong (HKG); W 5-1	Ye (CHN); L 1-5	12	did not advance				
Abdullah Alhaddad	Individual foil A	Demchuk (UKR); W 5-3		12	did not advance				

== See also ==
- Kuwait at the 2012 Summer Olympics
