= Table tennis at the 2016 Summer Paralympics – Women's individual – Class 6 =

Table tennis at the XV Paralympic Games
- Venue: Riocentro Pavilion 3
- Dates: 8–12 September 2016
- Competitors: 6 from 5 nations

Medalists
1st place, gold medalist(s)		Sandra Paovic	Croatia
2nd place, silver medalist(s)		Stephanie Grebe	Germany
3rd place, bronze medalist(s)		Maryna Lytovchenko	Ukraine

The women's individual table tennis – Class 6 tournament at the 2016 Summer Paralympics in Rio de Janeiro took place during 8–12 September 2016 at Riocentro Pavilion 3. Classes 6–10 were for athletes with a physical impairment who competed from a standing position; the lower the number, the greater the impact the impairment was on an athlete's ability to compete.

In the preliminary stage, athletes competed in two groups of three. Winners and runners-up of each group qualified to the semifinals.

== Results ==
Semifinals
A1	Sandra Paovic (CRO)	11	11	10	11
B2	Maryna Lytovchenko (UKR)	6	8	12	9
A2	Antonina Khodzynska (UKR)	8	11	8	11	9
B1	Stephanie Grebe (GER)	11	9	11	4	11

Final
A1	Sandra Paovic (CRO)	11	11	11
B1	Stephanie Grebe (GER)	2	7	4
Bronze medal match
B2	Maryna Lytovchenko (UKR)	11	6	11	7	11
A2	Antonina Khodzynska (UKR)	9	11	7	11	7

=== Preliminary round ===
Qualified for the semifinals

==== Group A ====
Athlete	Won	Lost	Games won	Points diff
Sandra Paovic (CRO)	2	0	6	4
Antonina Khodzynska (UKR)	1	1	5	1
Lee Kun-Woo (KOR)	0	2	2	1

8 September 2016

Sandra Paovic (CRO)	11	11	11
Lee Kun-Woo (KOR)	7	1	4

8 September 2016

Lee Kun-Woo (KOR)	4	11	11	8	9
Antonina Khodzynska (UKR)	11	4	8	11	11

8 September 2016

Sandra Paovic (CRO)	8	12	11	8	12
Antonina Khodzynska (UKR)	11	10	4	11	10

==== Group B ====
Athlete	Won	Lost	Games won	Points diff
Stephanie Grebe (GER)	2	0	6	4
Maryna Lytovchenko (UKR)	1	1	4	1
Katarzyna Marszal (POL)	0	2	1	-1

8 September 2016

Stephanie Grebe (GER)	11	7	11	11
Maryna Lytovchenko (UKR)	8	11	6	7

8 September 2016

Stephanie Grebe (GER)	11	4	11	11
Katarzyna Marszal (POL)	8	11	9	9

9 September 2016

Katarzyna Marszal (POL)	14	6	9
Maryna Lytovchenko (UKR)	16	11	11
