= Sandra Paović =

Croatian para table tennis player

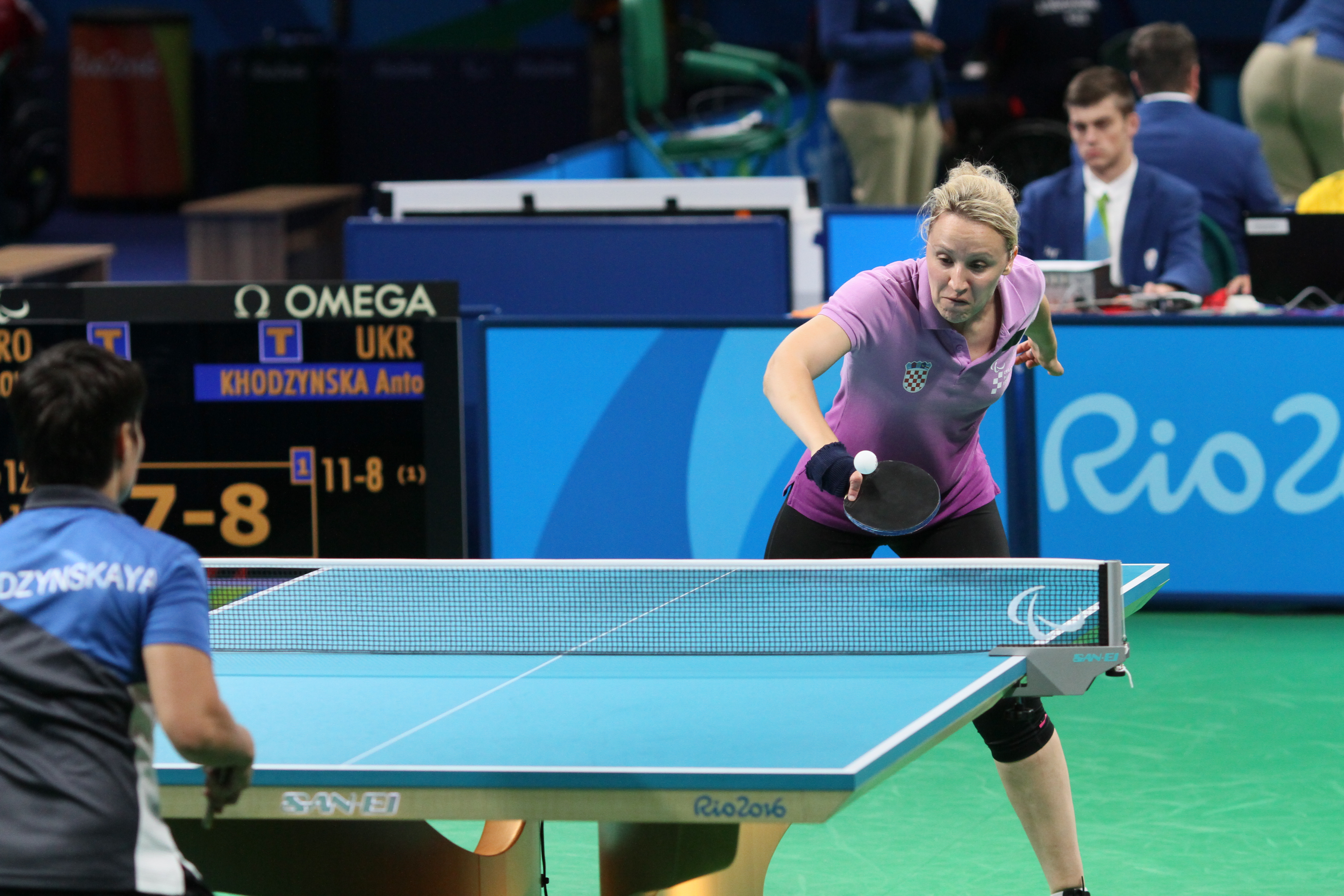
- Paović at the 2016 Paralympic Games

Personal information
- Nickname: Sale
- Nationality: Croatian
- Born: 15 April 1983 (age 43) Vukovar, SR Croatia, SFR Yugoslavia
- Height: 168 cm (5 ft 6 in)

Sport
- Country: Croatia
- Sport: Para table tennis
- Disability: Spinal cord injury
- Disability class: C6
- Club: STKI Uriho
- Coached by: Nataša Skočilović
- Retired: 2017
Medal record
Para table tennis
Representing Croatia
Paralympic Games
Gold medal – first place	2016 Rio de Janeiro	Women's singles C6
World Championships
Gold medal – first place	2014 Beijing	Women's singles C6
World Team Championships
Bronze medal – third place	2017 Bratislava	Women's teams C9-10
European Championships
Gold medal – first place	2013 Lignano	Women's singles C6
Gold medal – first place	2015 Vejle	Women's singles C6

Sandra Paović (born 15 April 1983) is a former Croatian para table tennis player. Sandra suffered critical injuries in a traffic accident on 30 January 2009. As of December 2009, she was still undergoing therapy in the effort to regain full use of her legs.

== Sporting career ==
She first competed internationally at the 2008 Summer Olympics, reaching the second round of the singles competition. She also competed in the team competition.

She competed in para table tennis competitions in 2013 at the Lignano Master Open, she won her class 6 singles title four times. She competed at the 2016 Summer Paralympics, her first Paralympic Games where she won the gold medal after defeating Stephanie Grebe of Germany.
