= Dazhi building collapse =

2023 building collapse in Taipei, Taiwan

On the evening of September 7, 2023, an apartment building in the Dazhi area of Taipei, Taiwan, tilted and collapsed. The incident was widely attributed to improper diaphragm wall construction at a nearby development by KingTai Construction. By April 2024, five individuals related to the project had been indicted.

== Background ==
=== Development project ===
KingTai Construction was founded in 1979 and listed on the Taiwan Stock Exchange under ticker 2538 in November 1996. The company is active in the Taipei and New Taipei markets. After nearby residents raised safety concerns, the Department of Urban Development of Taipei City dispatched a letter on July 6, 2023, stating that a site inspection revealed “no immediate threat to public safety ... construction may proceed and will not be subject to further review.” Yu Ji-xue, director of the Taipei Construction Management Office, explained that when residents complained, the site excavation had not yet begun—only diaphragm wall work was in progress—and that on-site inspectors had found no obvious issues, though he did not rule out the possibility of error in that assessment.

=== Affected residence ===
The building at Lane 1, Alley 94, Dazhi Street, Zhongshan District, Taipei, is an apartment complex over 30–40 years old. Early signs of structural problems appeared in early 2023 or March. Residents repeatedly reported issues to the developers—KingTai Construction and St. Defu Construction—but neither company assumed responsibility. In April and May, residents appealed to Taipei City Government. The July 6 letter again concluded no construction-related damage. City councillors Chen Yi-jun and Wang Shih-chien received complaints in July; KingTai responded by patching cracks with cement, but the situation worsened.

== Collapse and response ==
On the afternoon of September 7, Councillor Chen Yi-jun inspected the site and documented significant damage: long and wide cracks, a deformed front entrance, bent iron window bars due to shifting, and severe water leakage. At 8:34 pm, police and firefighters received reports of multiple adjacent homes cracking and tilting. Officials evacuated residents and secured the area—attendees included Mayor Chiang Wan-an, Deputy Mayor Lee Szu-chuan, the Zhongshan District Mayor, and fire department officials. At 10:49 pm, the first-floor structure of one house collapsed, causing the entire building to sink. Emergency measures including water and grout injection were implemented to stabilize the site.

That night, 25 households were evacuated to the nearby private Dominic Foreigners' School; ten others to Shih Chien University. The total number of evacuees reached 159. On the following day, cracks appeared on the school's facilities, prompting precautionary suspension of classes. After structural engineers certified the buildings were safe, classes resumed on Monday the 11th, although playgrounds remained closed. No casualties were reported; a missing pet cat was rescued on September 10.

The Taipei Tourism and Information Office arranged emergency accommodation for residents at nine hotels. As the evacuee count rose, by September 8 a total of 201 households (454 residents) were housed in 15 hotels, peaking at 464 individuals across 20 hotels.

After consultation with engineering associations, authorities announced on the evening of September 10 that even-numbered and adjacent households could return. By the next morning, only 38 households had formally requested to move back. Director of the Taipei Construction Management Office, Wang Yu-fen, promised a community briefing, including engineers explaining the safety evaluations to ease residents’ concerns.

== Aftermath ==
=== Administrative actions ===
On September 8, Taipei’s Construction Management Department ordered a halt to the “KingTai Dazhi” project, and suspended operations at all seven construction sites in Taipei managed by KingTai Construction and FuYi Construction. Mayor Chiang Wan-an warned that no new works could start until KingTai took full responsibility. The city's Legal Affairs Bureau launched a “major disaster legal aid mechanism,” including forming a legal team and seeking asset preservation court orders. On September 9, the city requested court restraint of approximately NT$61.96 million from KingTai to cover potential costs. A second request for NT$200 million to offset victims’ losses followed on September 11, but both motions were denied by the court on the grounds that KingTai exhibited no financial abnormalities or evidence of asset concealment. The city announced on September 14 that it would not appeal the first ruling, and pledged to cover legal fees for the second if victims pursued it.

=== KingTai's response ===
On September 10, KingTai held an announcement at the Taiwan Stock Exchange. The chairman resigned on the spot. The general manager denied deserting the site and asserted he had been negotiating with affected residents in person. On September 11, he attended a discussion with evacuees and claimed a NT$100 million bond had been remitted into a designated account—a statement later contested because the funds were reportedly deposited into KingTai’s corporate account at Fubon Bank, rather than the pledged escrow account. By September 12, the city confirmed the funds were correctly allocated.

=== Demolition of the damaged structure ===
A demolition plan was released on September 20. Originally scheduled for September 25 to remove two adjacent buildings comprising 25 odd-numbered units, the plan was delayed after KingTai’s submission required revisions. The demolition commenced on the morning of the 26th, with an expected 10-day completion window. In reality, the demolition and site backfilling concluded by September 30, one day ahead of schedule.

== Investigation and prosecution ==
On September 9, Taipei District Prosecutors' Office launched a criminal investigation via its “Black Gold Task Force,” and the Ministry of Justice’s Agency Against Corruption directed the city's Integrity Department to investigate. A second wave of questioning and raids occurred on September 22, across ten sites including KingTai offices. Architects, site managers, and an assistant manager from KingTai were all interviewed, with suspicion of criminal offenses including violation of building codes and falsifying official documents. After overnight interrogation, an architect was released on bail of NT$600,000 for false documentation charges, while the assistant manager from KingTai and the construction manager from FuYi were released on bail of NT$250,000 and NT$100,000 respectively on charges of causing public endangerment. On April 29, 2024, Taipei prosecutors indicted five individuals—two team members and three KingTai personnel—on charges of violating building regulations and document falsification. In August 2026, the Taipei District Court sentenced three KingTai employees to prison terms ranging from eight months to 58 months.

== Relief and compensation ==
=== Municipal support ===
Taipei City's Social Affairs Bureau provided each affected household with a NT$6,000 consolation payment and placed case workers in the hotels to assist residents. The Tax Collection Department offered half or full exemption of property tax, depending on damage severity.

=== Developer compensation ===
KingTai pledged NT$50,000 per household. The offer included a clause to sign a joint-construction agreement, which drew criticism. The company clarified that the clause was only to document residents’ preferences and did not affect their legal rights to compensation.

== Impact of the incident ==
=== KingTai Construction ===
KingTai acknowledged that its construction caused the damage and pledged to take responsibility. Its stock price dropped two consecutive days to limit-down: from NT$X to NT$13.35 on September 8, and further to NT$12.05 on September 11, before rebounding to a high of NT$12.85 on the 12th. On September 25, KingTai announced via its fully owned subsidiaries that the board had approved the sale of the “KingTai Zhongxiao” building. Though the company did not specify the reason, the media speculated the sale was connected to the financial strain from the collapse. On October 4, the company disclosed the sale of the building for NT$12.5 billion to a “Mr. Li”—later revealed to be builder Li Cheng‑jin of Taoyuan.

=== Public and political response ===
Several local politicians—councillors Chen Yi‑jun and Wang Shih‑chien, and legislator Kao Chia‑yu—paid close attention to the collapse and municipal response. On September 8, Wang Shih‑chien filed a complaint with Taipei prosecutors accusing KingTai of public endangerment. On September 11, he added a complaint accusing the chairman of attempted manslaughter. On September 9, legislator Wang Hung‑wei, candidate Luo Chi‑chiang, and councillor You Shu‑hui filed with prosecutors accusing KingTai of violating building regulations, and Luo organized a legal team to represent evacuees.

=== Political contributions controversy ===
Post-incident scrutiny revealed that KingTai had donated to political figures since September 2022. According to records, 12 Taipei City Councillors received donations, including nine from the KMT and three from the DPP. The largest donation was NT$300,000 split over two payments to KMT’s Wang Hung‑wei during a legislative by-election and the 2022 council election. Since the accident occurred in Wang’s district, some DPP politicians questioned her ties to the developer. She stated her oversight was unaffected by donations and accused the DPP of politicizing the tragedy. She also claimed donations came from a former media senior in KingTai’s name and denied any relationship with the company’s executives—a statement later questioned under Taiwan’s Political Donations Act for possible name-lending of donations. On September 11, candidate Wu Cheng reported the matter to the Control Yuan.
