= Table tennis at the 2020 Summer Paralympics – Women's individual – Class 6 =

Table tennis at the XVI Paralympic Games
- Venue: Tokyo Metropolitan Gymnasium
- Dates: 25 – 30 August 2021
- Competitors: 9 from 7 nations

Medalists
1st place, gold medalist(s)		Maryna Lytovchenko	Ukraine
2nd place, silver medalist(s)		Maliak Alieva	RPC
3rd place, bronze medalist(s)		Raisa Chebanika	RPC
3rd place, bronze medalist(s)		Stephanie Grebe	Germany

The Women's individual table tennis – Class 6 tournament at the 2020 Summer Paralympics in Tokyo took place between 25 and 30 August 2021 at Tokyo Metropolitan Gymnasium. Classes 6–10 were for athletes with a physical impairment in their upper body, and who compete in a standing position. The lower the number, the greater the impact the impairment was on an athlete's ability to compete.

In the preliminary stage, athletes competed in three groups of three. The winners and runners-up of each group qualified for the knock-out stage. In this edition of the Games, no bronze medal match was held. The losers of each semifinal were automatically awarded a bronze medal.

== Results ==
All times are local time in UTC+9.

=== Main bracket ===
==== Final rounds ====
Quarterfinals
B2	Raisa Chebanika (RPC)	11	14	3	7	11
C2	Lee Kun-woo (KOR)	7	12	11	11	6
C1	Maliak Alieva (RPC)	15	11	11
A2	Rebecca Julian (AUS)	13	4	5

Semifinals
A1	Maryna Lytovchenko (UKR)	11	11	11
B2	Raisa Chebanika (RPC) (bronze)	3	8	2
A2	Maliak Alieva (RPC)	12	11	11
B1	Stephanie Grebe (GER) (bronze)	10	6	6

Gold medal match
A1	Maryna Lytovchenko (UKR)	11	11	11
C1	Maliak Alieva (RPC)	6	4	3

=== Preliminary round ===
Qualified for the knock-out stage

==== Group A ====
Seed	Athlete	Won	Lost	Points diff	Rank
1	Maryna Lytovchenko (UKR)	2	0	+34	1
8	Rebecca Julian (AUS)	1	1	0	2
6	Hanaa Ahmed Hammad (EGY)	0	2	–34	3

Rebecca Julian (AUS)	2	6	8
Maryna Lytovchenko (UKR)	11	11	11

Hanaa Ahmed Hammad (EGY)	6	4	6
Maryna Lytovchenko (UKR)	11	11	11

Hanaa Ahmed Hammad (EGY)	6	7	3
Rebecca Julian (AUS)	11	11	11

==== Group B ====
Seed	Athlete	Won	Lost	Points diff	Rank
4	Stephanie Grebe (GER)	2	0	+19	1
2	Raisa Chebanika (RPC)	1	1	+3	2
9	Moon Sung-Keum (KOR)	0	2	–22	3

Moon Sung-keum (KOR)	8	14	9	9
Raisa Chebanika (RPC)	11	12	11	11

Stephanie Grebe (GER)	12	7	11	11
Raisa Chebanika (RPC)	10	11	9	9

Stephanie Grebe (GER)	11	11	11
Moon Sung-keum (KOR)	3	7	6

==== Group C ====
Seed	Athlete	Won	Lost	Points diff	Rank
3	Maliak Alieva (RPC)	3	0	+28	1
5	Lee Kun-woo (KOR)	2	1	–13	2
7	Najlah Aldayyeni (IRQ)	1	2	–15	3

Najlah Aldayyeni (IRQ)	11	2	5	9
Maliak Alieva (RPC)	5	11	11	11

Lee Kun-woo (KOR)	11	7	4	1
Maliak Alieva (RPC)	7	11	11	11

Lee Kun-woo (KOR)	5	14	11	11
Najlah Aldayyeni (IRQ)	11	12	6	8
