= Wheelchair fencing at the 2012 Summer Paralympics – Men's sabre A =

Men's sabre A at the XIV Paralympic Games
- Paralympic Wheelchair fencing
- Venue: ExCeL Exhibition Centre
- Dates: 6 September
- Competitors: 15 from 9 nations

Medalists
1st place, gold medalist(s)		Chen Yijun	China
2nd place, silver medalist(s)		Tian Jianquan	China
3rd place, bronze medalist(s)		Chan Wing Kin	Hong Kong

The men's sabre A wheelchair fencing competition at the 2012 Summer Paralympics was held on 6 September at the ExCeL Exhibition Centre.

The tournament started with a group phase round-robin followed by a knockout stage.

During a qualification round-robin, bouts lasted a maximum of three minutes, or until one athlete had scored five hits. There was then a knockout phase, in which bouts lasted a maximum of nine minutes (three periods of three minutes), or until one athlete had scored 15 hits.

The event was won by Chen Yijun, representing China.

== Results ==
=== Preliminaries ===
==== Pool A ====
Rank	Competitor	MP	W	L	Points	CHN	HKG	FRA	GBR	UKR
1	Tian Jianquan (CHN)	4	4	0	20:8	x	5:1	5:3	5:2	5:2
2	Cheong Meng Chai (HKG)	4	3	1	16:13	1:5	x	5:3	5:4	5:1
3	Romain Noble (FRA)	4	2	2	16:13	3:5	3:5	x	5:1	5:2
4	Tom Hall Butcher (GBR)	4	1	3	12:16	2:5	4:5	1:5	x	5:1
5	Vadym Tsedryk (UKR)	4	0	4	6:20	2:5	1:5	2:5	1:5	x

==== Pool B ====
Rank	Competitor	MP	W	L	Points	HKG	CHN	RUS	POL	GRE
1	Chan Wing Kin (HKG)	4	4	0	20:10	x	5:3	5:3	5:2	5:2
2	Chen Yijun (CHN)	4	3	1	18:8	3:5	x	5:2	5:1	5:0
3	Timur Fayzullin (RUS)	4	2	2	15:13	3:5	2:5	x	5:2	5:1
4	Stefan Makowski (POL)	4	1	3	10:17	2:5	1:5	2:5	x	5:2
5	Georgios Alexakis (GRE)	4	0	4	5:20	2:5	0:5	1:5	2:5	x

==== Pool C ====
Rank	Competitor	MP	W	L	Points	GRE	RUS	POL	FRA	MAS
1	Gerasimos Pylarinos (GRE)	4	4	0	20:8	x	5:4	5:1	5:3	5:0
2	Sergey Frolov (RUS)	4	3	1	19:11	4:5	x	5:4	5:2	5:0
3	Radoslaw Stanczuk (POL)	4	2	2	15:15	1:5	4:5	x	5:2	5:3
4	Moez El Assine (FRA)	4	1	3	12:16	3:5	2:5	2:5	x	5:1
5	Abd Rahman Razali (MAS)	4	0	4	4:20	0:5	0:5	3:5	1:5	x

=== Competition bracket ===
Round of 16
Radoslaw Stanczuk (POL)	15
Timur Fayzullin (RUS)	14
Tom Hall Butcher (GBR)	10
Cheong Meng Chai (HKG)	15
Romain Noble (FRA)	13
Moez El Assine (FRA)	15

Quarterfinals
Gerasimos Pylarinos (GRE)	6
Radoslaw Stanczuk (POL)	15
Sergey Frolov (RUS)	6
Chen Yijun (CHN)	15
Chan Wing Kin (HKG)	15
Cheong Meng Chai (HKG)	11
Moez El Assine (FRA)	6
Tian Jianquan (CHN)	15

Semifinals
Radoslaw Stanczuk (POL)	8
Chen Yijun (CHN)	15
Chan Wing Kin (HKG)	4
Tian Jianquan (CHN)	15

Final
Chen Yijun (CHN)	15
Tian Jianquan (CHN)	12
Third place
Radoslaw Stanczuk (POL)	9
Chan Wing Kin (HKG)	15
