= Maliak Alieva =

Russian para table tennis player (born 1995)

Personal information
- Born: 8 March 1995 (age 31) Yershov, Russia

Sport
- Sport: Table tennis
Medal record
Women's para table tennis
Representing RPC
Paralympic Games
| Silver medal – second place | 2020 Tokyo | Singles C6 |
| Bronze medal – third place | 2020 Tokyo | Team C6–8 |
Representing Neutral Paralympic Athletes
Paralympic Games
| Bronze medal – third place | 2024 Paris | Singles C6 |

Maliak Alieva (born 8 March 1995) is a Russian para table tennis player. She won the silver medal in the women's individual C6 event at the 2020 Summer Paralympics held in Tokyo, Japan. She also won one of the bronze medals in the women's team 6–8 event. In 2024, she won a bronze medal at the Summer Paralympics held in Paris, France.
