= Raisa Chebanika =

Russian para table tennis player

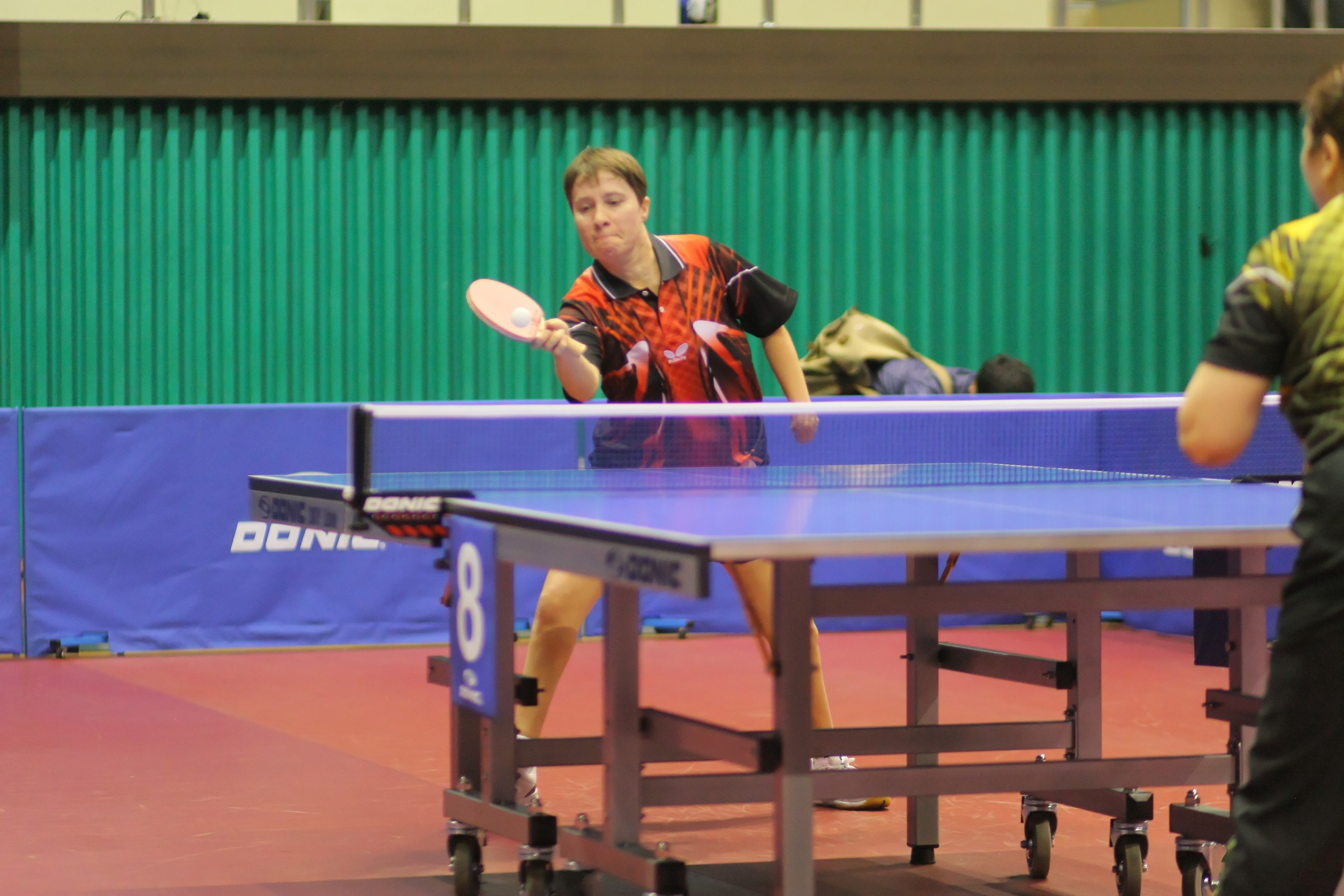
- Raisa Chebanika playing during the 2010 World Para Table Tennis Championships, October 31.

Personal information
- Born: 5 July 1964 (age 62) Olănești, Moldova

Sport
- Sport: Table tennis
Medal record
Women's para table tennis
Paralympic Games
Representing Russia
Gold medal – first place	2012 London	Singles C6
Representing RPC
Bronze medal – third place	2020 Tokyo	Singles C6
Bronze medal – third place	2020 Tokyo	Teams C6-8

Raisa Chebanika (born 5 July 1964) is a Moldovan-born Russian para table tennis player. She won the gold medal in the women's individual C6 event at the 2012 Summer Paralympics held in London, United Kingdom.

In 2021, she won one of the bronze medals in the women's individual C6 event at the 2020 Summer Paralympics held in Tokyo, Japan. She also won one of the bronze medals in the women's team 6–8 event.
