= Maryna Lytovchenko =

Ukrainian para table tennis player

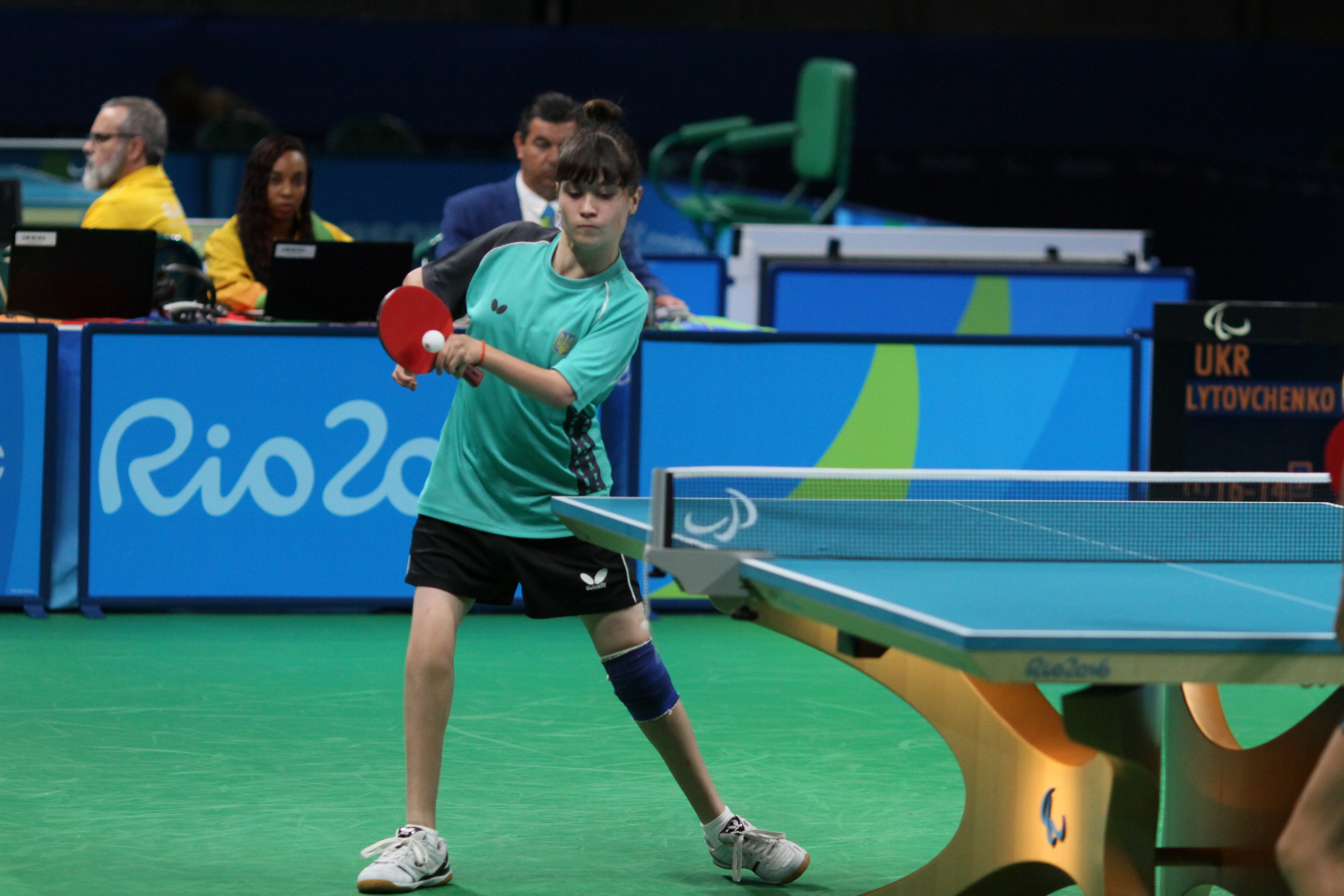

Personal information
- Born: 26 May 1995 (age 31) Kharkiv, Ukraine
- Height: 156 cm (5 ft 1 in)

Sport
- Country: Ukraine
- Sport: Para table tennis
- Disability: Cerebral palsy
- Disability class: C6
Medal record
Women's para table tennis
Representing Ukraine
Paralympic Games
Gold medal – first place	2020 Tokyo	Singles C6
Silver medal – second place	2024 Paris	Singles C6
Bronze medal – third place	2016 Rio de Janeiro	Singles C6
World Championships
Gold medal – first place	2018 Lasko	Singles C6
World Team Championships
Silver medal – second place	2017 Bratislava	Teams C6-7
European Championships
Bronze medal – third place	2013 Lignano	Teams C6-8
Bronze medal – third place	2015 Vejle	Singles C6
Bronze medal – third place	2017 Lasko	Singles C6

Maryna Lytovchenko (born 26 May 1991) is a Ukrainian para table tennis player who has mild cerebral palsy.

== Career ==
Maryna Lytowtschenko was born with mild cerebral palsy. She competed in four European Championships, winning bronze four times, three times in singles and once with the team. In 2017, the Ukrainian won silver with the team at the World Championships, and a year later she won gold in singles. Thanks to her strong performances, including at smaller tournaments, she was eventually nominated for the 2016 Paralympics, where Lytovchenko won the match for third place. She lives in Kharkiv and studies at the V. N. Karazin Kharkiv National University.
