= Alicja Eigner =

Polish para table tennis player

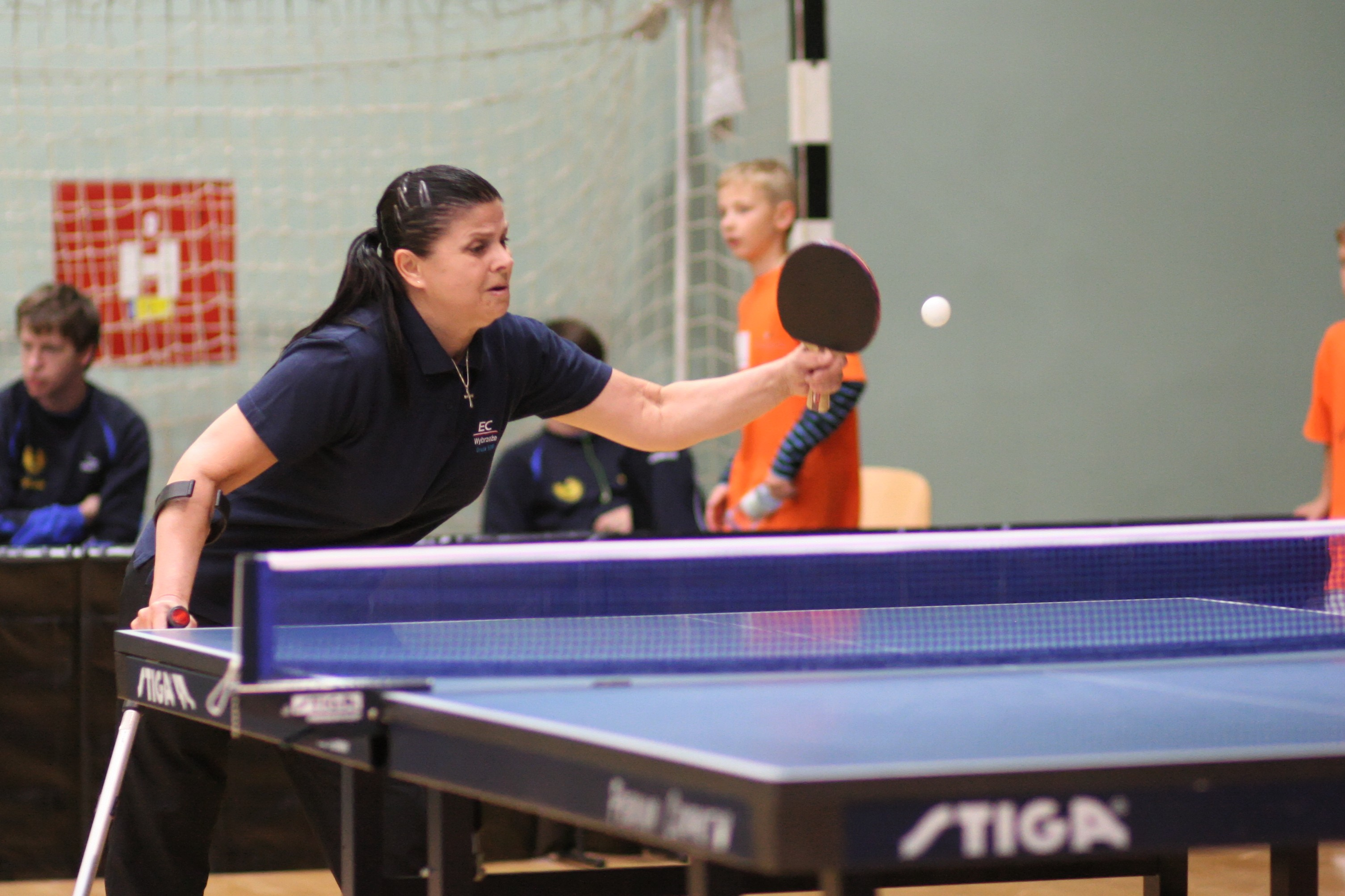
- Eigner in 2009

Personal information
- Nickname: Legnica's Ping-Pong Queen
- Born: 18 September 1958 (age 67) Legnica, Poland

Sport
- Country: Poland
- Sport: Para table tennis
- Disability: Polio
- Disability class: C6
- Retired: 2012
Medal record
Para table tennis
Representing Poland
Paralympic Games
Bronze medal – third place	2012 London	Women's teams C6-10
World Championships
Bronze medal – third place	2010 Gwangju	Women's singles C6
Bronze medal – third place	2010 Gwangju	Women's teams C9-10
European Championships
Gold medal – first place	2001 Frankfurt	Women's teams C5
Silver medal – second place	2005 Jesolo	Women's teams C5

Alicja Eigner (born 18 September 1958) is a retired Polish para table tennis player who competed in international level events. She is a European champion, a double World bronze medalist and a Paralympic bronze medalist. She has won team event medals with Natalia Partyka, Malgorzata Jankowska and Katarzyna Marszal.
