= Chen Yijun =

Chinese wheelchair fencer

Personal information
- Born: 1983 (age 42–43) Shanghai, China

Sport
- Country: China
- Sport: Wheelchair fencing
Medal record
Paralympic Games
Gold medal – first place	2012 London	Sabre A
Gold medal – first place	2012 London	Team foil
Silver medal – second place	2012 London	Foil A
Asian Para Games
Gold medal – first place	2018 Jakarta	Team foil
Gold medal – first place	2018 Jakarta	Sabre A
Gold medal – first place	2018 Jakarta	Team sabre
Bronze medal – third place	2018 Jakarta	Foil A

Chen Yijun (born 1983) is a Chinese wheelchair fencer. He represented China at the 2012 Summer Paralympics and at the 2016 Summer Paralympics. In total, he won two gold medals and one silver medal, all at the 2012 Summer Paralympics.
