= Antonina Khodzynska =

Ukrainian tennis player

Personal information
- Born: 1 August 1983 (age 42) Kharkiv, Soviet Union

Sport
- Country: Ukraine
- Sport: Para table tennis
- Disability: Cerebral palsy
- Disability class: C6
Medal record
Para table tennis
Representing Ukraine
Paralympic Games
Silver medal – second place	2012 London	Singles C6
World Championships
Bronze medal – third place	2006 Montreux	Singles C6-7
World Team Championships
Silver medal – second place	2017 Bratislava	Teams C6-7
European Championships
Gold medal – first place	2011 Split	Teams C6-7
Silver medal – second place	2011 Split	Singles C6
Silver medal – second place	2015 Vejle	Singles C6
Bronze medal – third place	2013 Lignano	Teams C6-8
Bronze medal – third place	2017 Lasko	Singles C6

Antonina Khodzynska (born 1 August 1983) is a Ukrainian former para table tennis player who competed at international table tennis competitions. She is a Paralympic silver medalist, World silver medalist and European champion. She has won numerous medals with Maryna Lytovchenko, Yuliya Klymenko and Viktoriia Safonova.
