= Rebecca Julian =

Australian para table tennis player

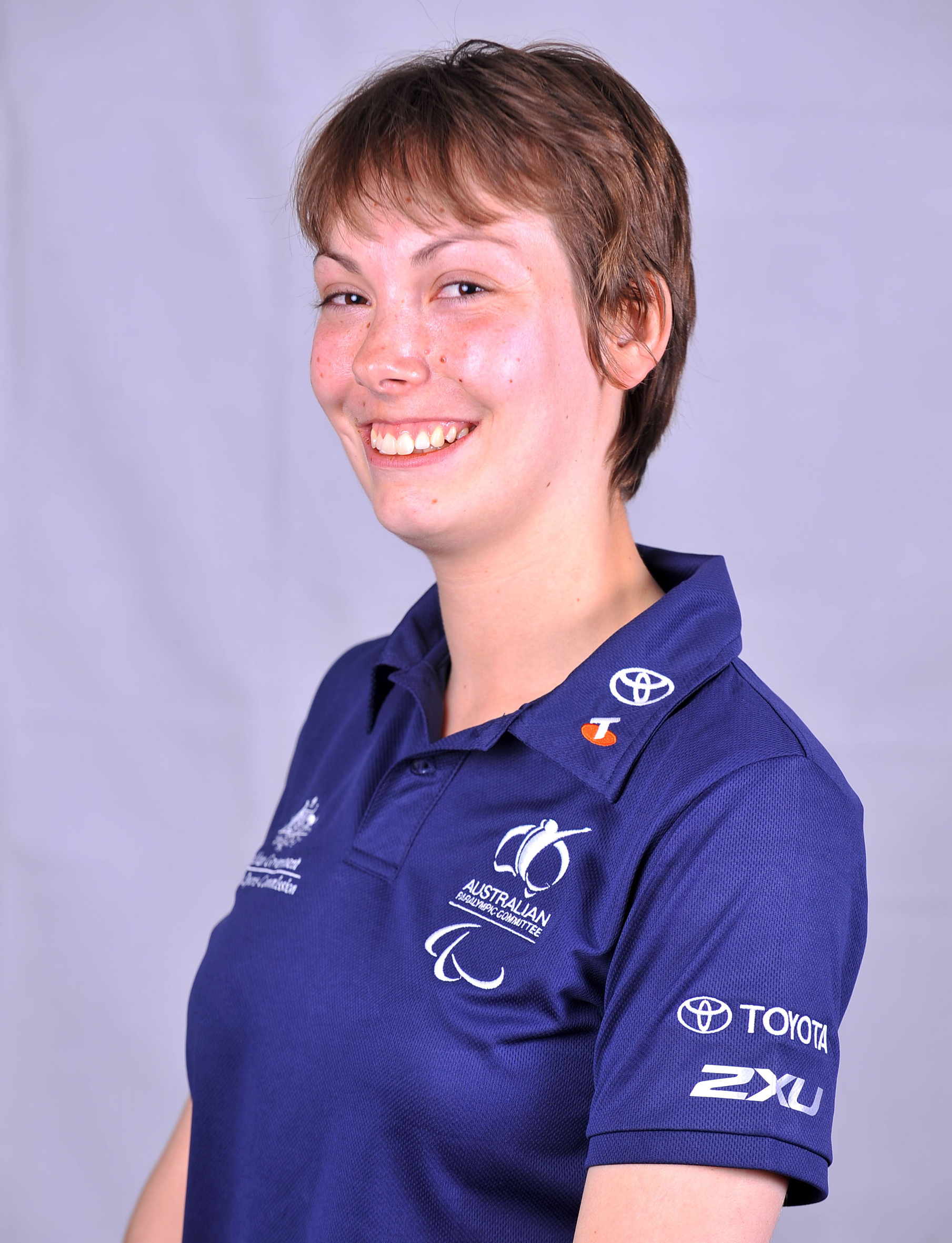
- 2012 Australian Paralympic team portrait of Julian

Personal information
- Nationality: Australian
- Born: 2 December 1986 (age 39)

Sport
- Country: Australia
- Sport: Table tennis
- Event(s): Women's singles Women's doubles

Rebecca Julian (born 2 December 1986) is an Australian table tennis player. She has represented Australia at three Summer Paralympics - 2008, 2012 and 2020 in women's doubles and singles table tennis.

== Personal ==
Julian was born on 2 December 1986 and is from Mooroolbark, Victoria. She has cerebral palsy and hemianopia.

Julian attended Deakin University, where she earned a Bachelor of Early Childhood Education in 2008; as of 2021, she is working as a kindergarten teacher.

== Table tennis ==
Julian is a class 6 table tennis player. She has been ranked as high as number two in the world.

Julian started in the sport at the age of twelve at the suggestion of her school physical education teacher. Her first club was the Croydon and District Table Tennis Association, where she still plays in able-bodied pennant competition. In her first athletes with disabilities competition, as a 16-year-old, she debuted in the national team and finished third in her class at the 2005 Asian Oceania Championships in Malaysia. At the 2006 World Championships in Switzerland she became the first Australian woman to compete at the para World Championships; at the 2007 US Open in Chicago, she finished first. In 2017 she became Oceania Class 6-8 Regional Champion and the first para table tennis player to qualify for 3 World Championships.

Julian competed in the 2008 Summer Paralympics, where she lost in the opening round to the number one ranked player in five sets. She was later named the 2007/2008 Table Tennis Australia AWD Best Player. She has also competed at the Korean hosted 2010 World Championships.

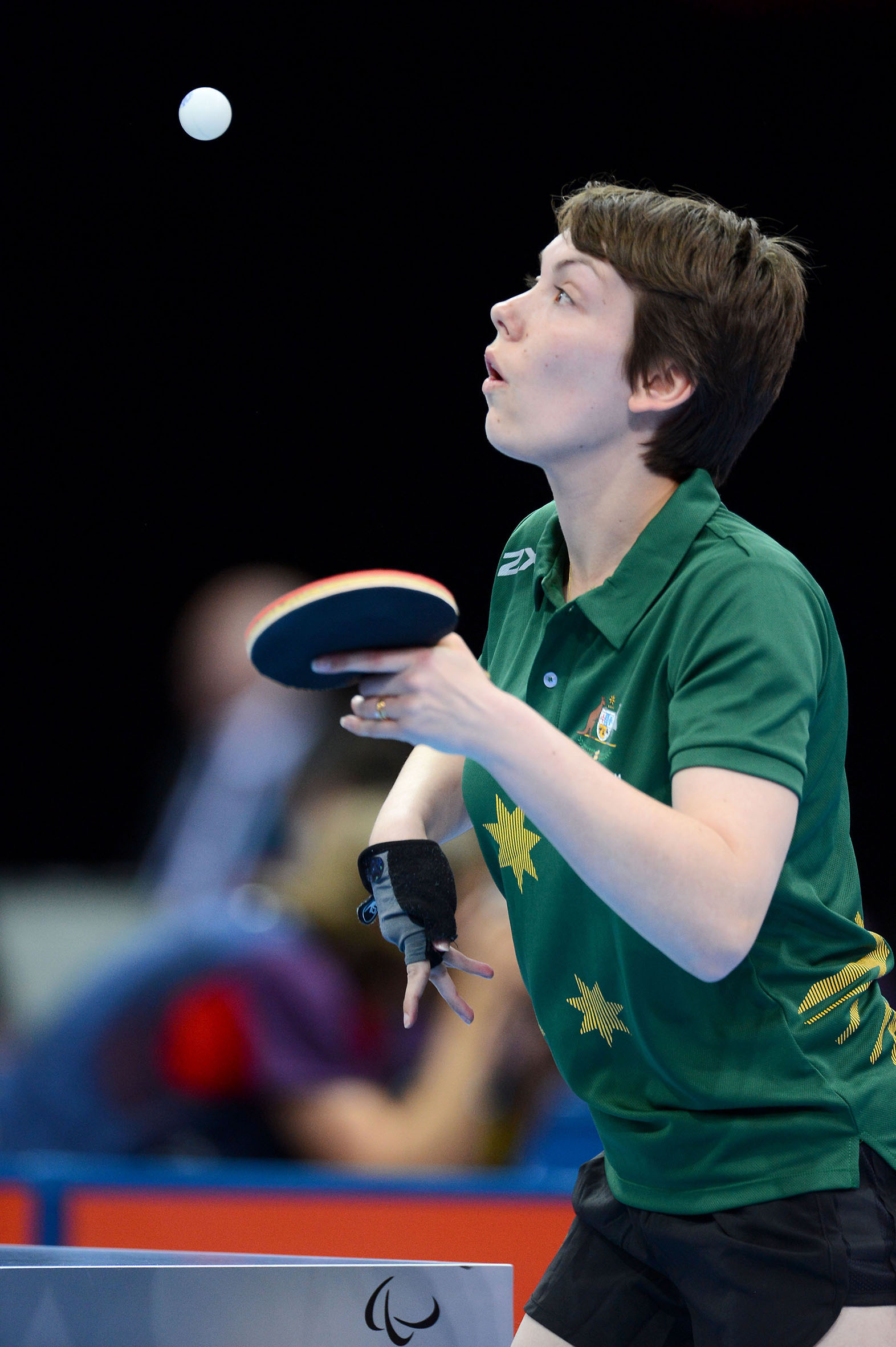
Julian at the 2012 Summer Paralympics

Julian competed at the 2011 Arafura Games, playing doubles with Sarah Lazzaro. Together, they beat Japan. She was chosen to lead the Australian delegation out on the grounds during the Games opening ceremonies.

She represented Australia at the 2012 Summer Paralympics in women's singles and doubles table tennis. In three matches, she won one and lost two.

She won a bronze medal at the 2017 International Table Tennis Federation (ITTF) Para-table Tennis Open in Suphan Buri, Thailand, and silver at the 2019 Arafura Games in Darwin, Northern Territory, which doubled as the 2019 ITTF Para-table Tennis Oceania Championships.

At the 2020 Tokyo Paralympics, she reached the quarter-finals in the Women's Singles C6.
