= Damien Tokatlian =

French wheelchair fencer (born 1970)

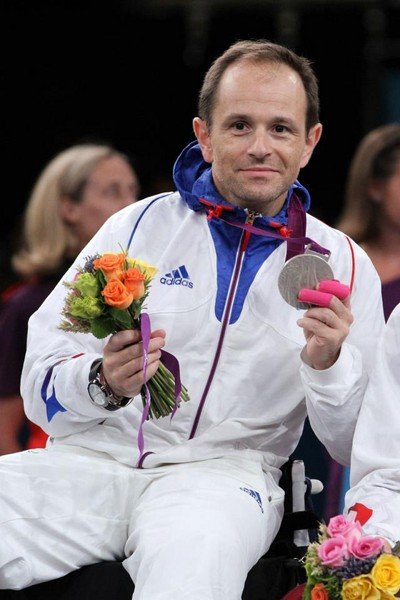

Personal information
- Born: 5 January 1970 (age 56) Clermont-Ferrand, France

Sport
- Country: France
- Sport: Wheelchair fencing
Medal record
Paralympic Games
| Silver medal – second place | 2012 London | Team |
| Bronze medal – third place | 2016 Rio de Janeiro | Team |
| Bronze medal – third place | 2020 Tokyo | Team |
| Bronze medal – third place | 2024 Paris | Team foil |

Damien Tokatlian (born 5 January 1970) is a French wheelchair fencer. He won a medal at three editions of the Summer Paralympics. He won the silver medal in the men's team foil event at the 2012 Summer Paralympics in London, United Kingdom and the bronze medal in this event at the 2016 Summer Paralympics in Rio de Janeiro, Brazil. He also won the bronze medal in the men's team foil event at the 2020 Summer Paralympics held in Tokyo, Japan.
