= Andrii Demchuk =

Ukrainian wheelchair fencer

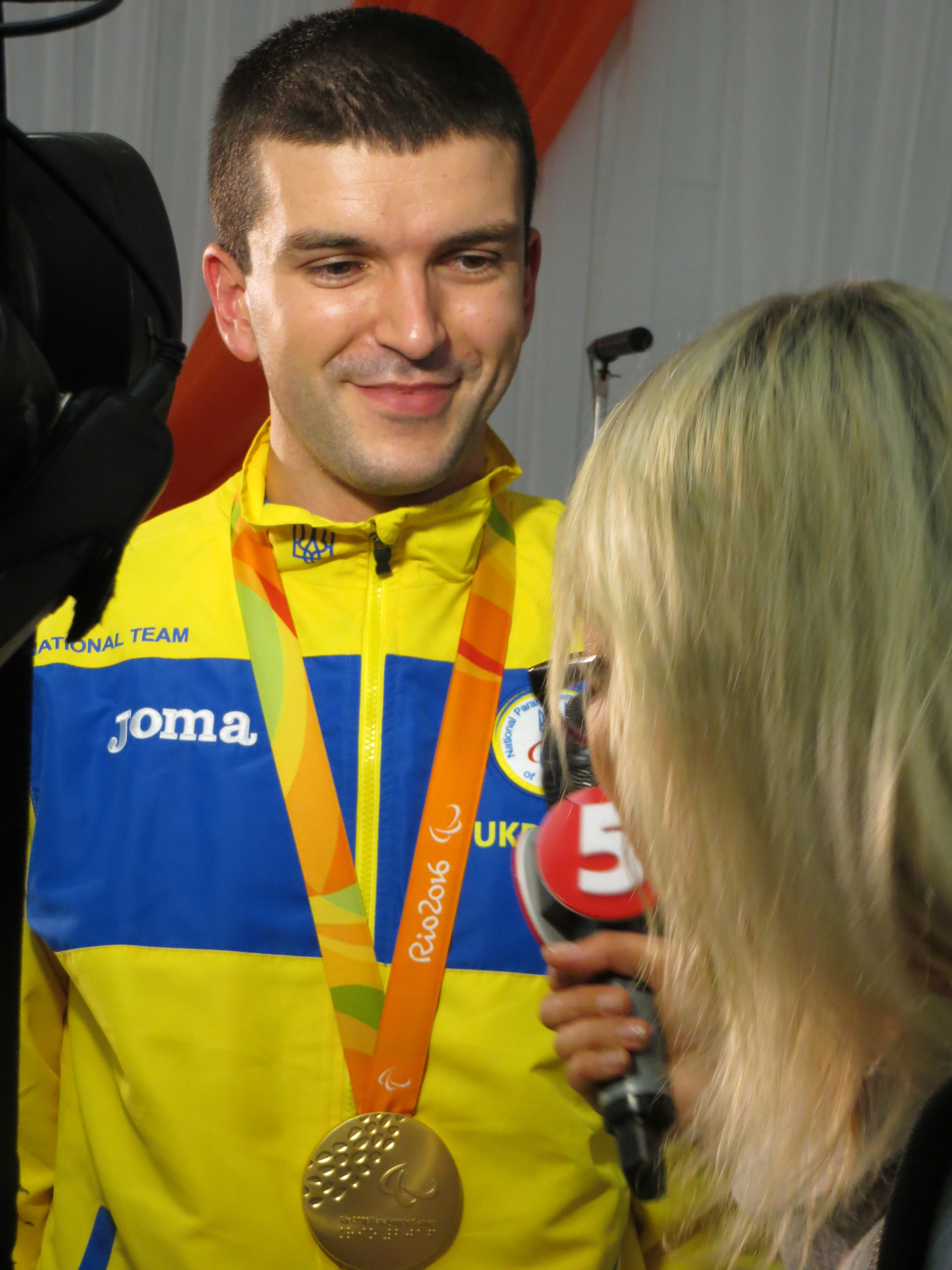
- Andrii Demchuk (2016)

Personal information
- Born: 14 December 1987 (age 38)

Sport
- Country: Ukraine
- Sport: Wheelchair fencing
Medal record
Paralympic Games
Gold medal – first place	2016 Rio de Janeiro	Sabre A

Andrii Demchuk (Ukrainian: Андрій Богданович Демчук; born 14 December 1987) is a Ukrainian wheelchair fencer who competes in épée, foil and sabre. He represented Ukraine at the 2016 Summer Paralympics and he won the gold medal in the men's sabre A event. He also represented Ukraine at the 2012 Summer Paralympics without winning a medal.

From May 22 to May 25, 2019, the stage of Wheelchair Fencing World Cup took place in Sao Paulo, Brazil. Andrii Demchuk won silver and bronze medals.

In the November 2019 event of the IWAS Wheelchair Fencing World Cup he won the silver medal in the men's sabre A event.
