= Stephanie Grebe =

German para table tennis player

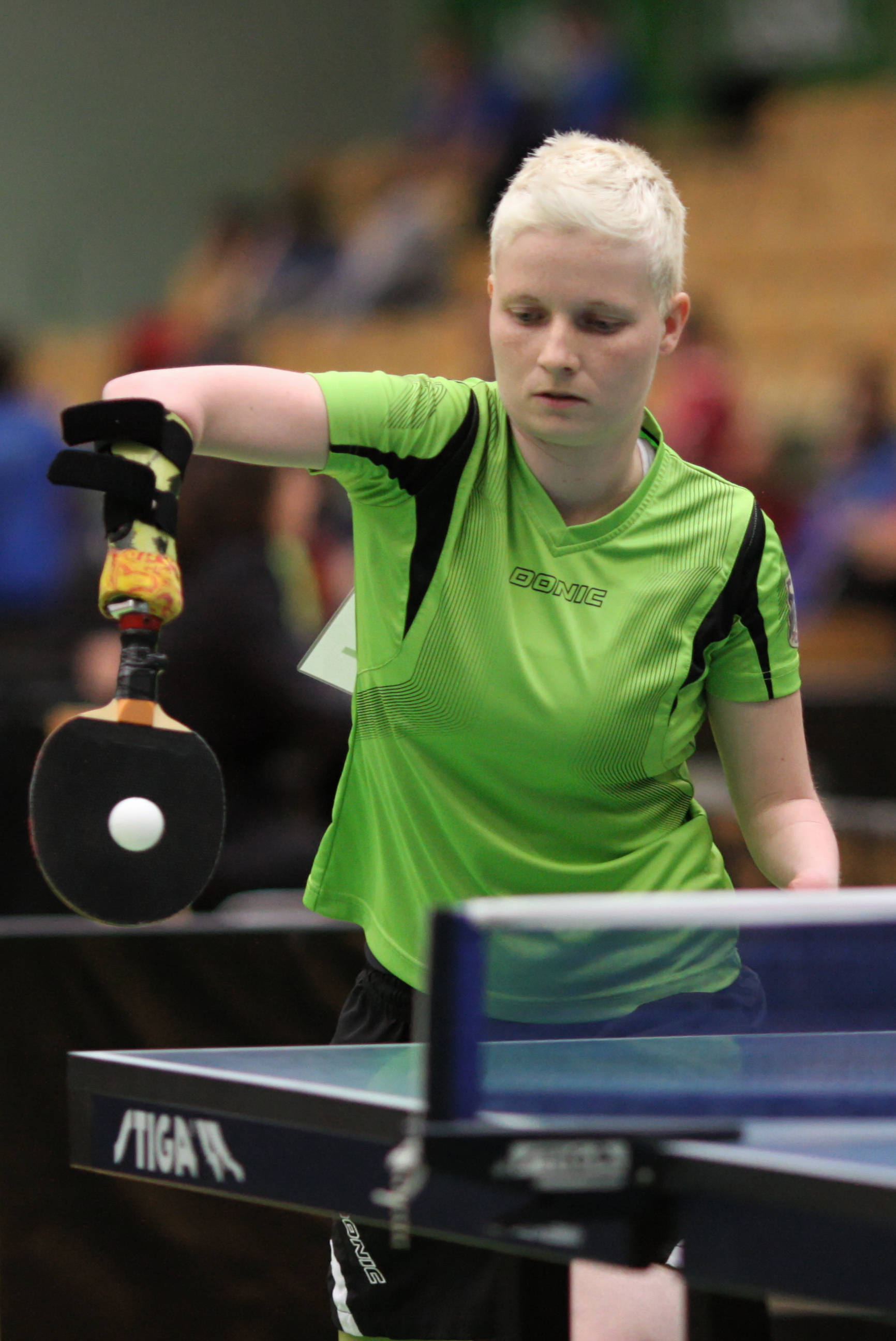
- Grebe in 2013

Personal information
- Nicknames: Steffi, Lieschen
- Nationality: German
- Born: 24 September 1987 (age 38)
- Home town: Tornesch, Germany
- Height: 155 cm (5 ft 1 in)

Sport
- Country: Germany
- Sport: Para table tennis
- Disability class: C6
- Club: Borussia Dusseldorf
- Coached by: Hannes Doesseler
Medal record
Para table tennis
Representing Germany
Paralympic Games
Silver medal – second place	2016 Rio de Janeiro	Women's singles C6
Silver medal – second place	2024 Paris	Women's doubles WD14
Bronze medal – third place	2020 Tokyo	Women's singles C6
World Championships
Silver medal – second place	2014 Beijing	Women's singles C6
Silver medal – second place	2014 Beijing	Women's teams C6-8
Bronze medal – third place	2018 Lasko	Women's singles C6
European Championships
Gold medal – first place	2017 Lasko	Women's teams C6-8
Silver medal – second place	2015 Vejle	Women's teams C6-8
Bronze medal – third place	2011 Split	Women's singles C6
Bronze medal – third place	2011 Split	Women's teams C8
Bronze medal – third place	2013 Lignano	Women's singles C6

Stephanie "Steffi" Grebe (born 24 September 1987) is a German para table tennis player who was born without her left and right forearms, she is a right-handed player.

== Career ==
She won the silver medal in the women's individual C6 event at the 2016 Summer Paralympics held in Rio de Janeiro, Brazil.

In 2021, she won one of the bronze medals in the women's individual C6 event at the 2020 Summer Paralympics held in Tokyo, Japan.
