= Katarzyna Marszał =

Polish para table tennis player

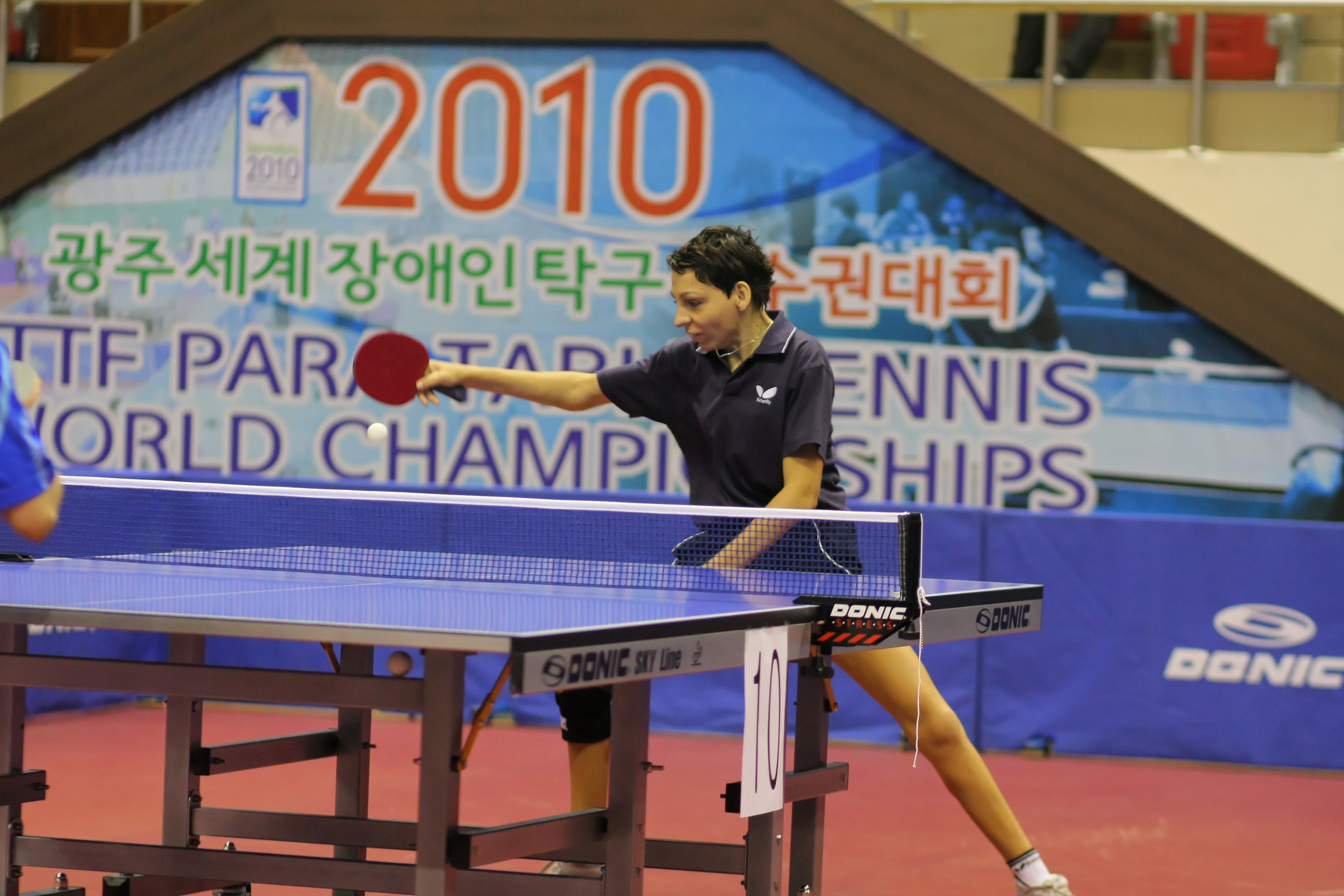

Personal information
- Born: 18 June 1985 (age 41) Brzeziny, Polish People's Republic
- Height: 160 cm (5 ft 3 in)

Sport
- Country: Poland
- Sport: Para table tennis
- Disability: Collagenosis
- Disability class: C6
- Coached by: Andrzej Ochal; Ela Madejska
Medal record
Para table tennis
Representing Poland
Paralympic Games
Gold medal – first place	2016 Rio de Janeiro	Women's team C6-10
World Championships
Gold medal – first place	2010 Gwangju	Women's singles C6
Bronze medal – third place	2010 Gwangju	Women's teams C9-10
European Championships
Gold medal – first place	2019 Helsingborg	Women's teams C6-8
Silver medal – second place	2017 Lasko	Women's singles C6
Bronze medal – third place	2013 Vejle	Women's teams C6-8
Bronze medal – third place	2017 Lasko	Women's teams C9-10

Katarzyna Marszał (born 18 June 1985) is a Polish para table tennis player who plays in international level events. She has won team event titles with Natalia Partyka and Karolina Pęk.
